= 2004–05 Derby County F.C. season =

Derby County
2004–05 season
- Chairman: (England) John Sleightholme
- Manager: (Scotland) George Burley
- Stadium: Pride Park
- Championship: 4th
- FA Cup: Fourth round
- League Cup: First round
- Top goalscorer: League: Grzegorz Rasiak (16); All: Rasiak (17)
- Average home league attendance: 25,219

During the 2004–05 English football season, Derby County F.C. competed in the Football League Championship.

== Season summary ==
With little money to spend, Burley played the markets and made two key free signings in Iñigo Idiakez and Grzegorz Rasiak. Idiakez was voted the club's Player of the Season and Rasiak finished top scorer (with 17 goals) as Derby confounded their form of the last 5 years to grab a fourth-placed finish in the newly rebranded Football League Championship and entrance into the 2004–05 play-offs. With a more settled side than he was previously allowed – Burley only used 24 players, 7 of whom were involved in 10 or less games – and a strong mix of academy graduates (Lee Grant, Pablo Mills, Tom Huddlestone, Marcus Tudgay) and inspired purchases (Rasiak, Idiakez, Tommy Smith) Derby enjoyed a splendid second half to the season, recording just 6 defeats in their final 24 fixtures, including a run of 1 defeat in 14, and equalled the club record for away wins in a season and setting a club record of 6 consecutive away victories. However, the club entered the play-offs without the presence of key duo Rasiak and Idiakez – both unavailable through injury – and a 2–0 defeat in the first leg away to Preston North End proved impossible to overturn in the second leg at Pride Park, which finished 0–0 in front of a crowd of over 31,000. Behind the scenes, circumstances were deteriorating, and Burley left his position, citing interference from football agent turned Director of Football Murdo Mackay, and the sale of Huddlestone, to Tottenham Hotspur, against his wishes. Financial circumstances were worsening as the debt spiralled to over £30m, despite Burley building success on the pitch without any transfer funds. A refinancing scheme was put in place which saw Pride Park sold to the "mysterious" Panama-based ABC Corporation and the club paying rent of £1m a year to play there, which local journalist Gerald Mortimer described as "an affront . . . to those who put everything into building (the ground)."

== Final league table ==
Pos	Team	Pld	W	D	L	GF	GA	GD	Pts	Promotion, qualification or relegation
2	Wigan Athletic (P)	46	25	12	9	79	35	+44	87	Promotion to the FA Premier League
3	Ipswich Town	46	24	13	9	85	56	+29	85	Qualification for Championship play-offs
4	Derby County	46	22	10	14	71	60	+11	76	Qualification for Championship play-offs
5	Preston North End	46	21	12	13	67	58	+9	75	Qualification for Championship play-offs
6	West Ham United (O, P)	46	21	10	15	66	56	+10	73	Qualification for Championship play-offs

Updated to match(es) played on 9 December 2011. Source: Football League Tables
Rules for classification: 1) points; 2) goal difference; 3) number of goals scored.
(O) Play-off winners; (P) Promoted

== Results ==
Derby County's score comes first

=== Legend ===
Win	Draw	Loss

=== Football League Championship ===
Date	Opponent	Venue	Result	Attendance	Scorers
7 August 2004	Leeds United	A	0–1	30,459	
11 August 2004	Leicester City	H	1–2	26,650	Tudgay
14 August 2004	Ipswich Town	H	3–2	22,234	Reich (2), Idiakez
21 August 2004	Queens Park Rangers	A	2–0	15,295	Smith, Tudgay
28 August 2004	Crewe Alexandra	H	2–4	24,436	Tudgay, Idiakez
30 August 2004	Stoke City	A	0–1	18,673	
11 September 2004	Reading	H	2–1	22,096	Smith, Tudgay
18 September 2004	Cardiff City	A	2–0	23,422	Reich, Taylor
22 September 2004	Millwall	A	1–3	9,132	Reich
25 September 2004	Wigan Athletic	H	1–1	26,113	Smith
29 September 2004	West Ham United	H	1–1	23,112	Johnson
2 October 2004	Sunderland	A	0–0	29,881	
16 October 2004	Watford	H	2–2	23,253	Smith, Rasiak
19 October 2004	Wolverhampton Wanderers	A	0–2	26,465	
22 October 2004	Burnley	A	2–0	13,703	Tudgay, Reich
30 October 2004	Rotherham United	H	3–2	25,096	Rasiak, Peschisolido, Vincent
3 November 2004	Brighton & Hove Albion	H	3–0	22,480	Smith, Rasiak (2)
6 November 2004	Watford	A	2–2	13,689	Taylor, Peschisolido
13 November 2004	Gillingham	A	2–0	8,015	Rasiak, Taylor
20 November 2004	Sheffield United	H	0–1	25,725	
27 November 2004	Preston North End	A	0–3	12,702	
4 December 2004	Coventry City	H	2–2	22,648	Rasiak, Peschisolido
11 December 2004	Nottingham Forest	H	3–0	30,793	Smith, Rasiak (2)
18 December 2004	Plymouth Argyle	A	2–0	15,335	Coughlan (own goal), Peschisolido
26 December 2004	Wigan Athletic	A	2–1	12,420	Rasiak, Smith
28 December 2004	Millwall	H	0–3	27,725	
1 January 2005	Cardiff City	H	0–1	22,800	
3 January 2005	Reading	A	1–0	15,491	Smith
16 January 2005	Sunderland	H	0–2	22,995	
23 January 2005	West Ham United	A	2–1	30,347	Rasiak (2)
26 January 2005	Leeds United	H	2–0	25,648	Smith, Bolder
5 February 2005	Brighton & Hove Albion	A	3–2	6,587	Bisgaard, Tudgay (2)
19 February 2005	Rotherham United	A	3–1	7,937	Rasiak, Tudgay, Idiakez (pen)
23 February 2005	Burnley	H	1–1	23,701	Peschisolido
26 February 2005	Nottingham Forest	A	2–2	26,160	Rasiak (2)
2 March 2005	Wolverhampton Wanderers	H	3–3	24,109	Idiakez (2, 1 pen), Reich
5 March 2005	Plymouth Argyle	H	1–0	27,581	Idiakez
16 March 2005	Queens Park Rangers	H	0–0	24,486	
2 April 2005	Ipswich Town	A	2–3	28,796	Tudgay, Idiakez
5 April 2005	Crewe Alexandra	A	2–1	8,026	Rasiak, Smith
9 April 2005	Stoke City	H	3–1	27,640	Rasiak, Bisgaard, Idiakez
15 April 2005	Sheffield United	A	1–0	20,794	Bisgaard
23 April 2005	Gillingham	H	2–0	27,481	Bisgaard, Peschisolido
26 April 2005	Leicester City	A	0–1	25,762	
30 April 2005	Coventry City	A	2–6	22,728	Bolder, Peschisolido
8 May 2005	Preston North End	H	3–1	31,237	Idiakez, Smith, Peschisolido

=== Championship play-offs ===
Round	Date	Opponent	Venue	Result	Attendance	Goalscorers
SF 1st Leg	15 May 2005	Preston North End	A	0–2	20,315	
SF 2nd Leg	19 May 2005	Preston North End	H	0–0	31,310	

=== FA Cup ===
Round	Date	Opponent	Venue	Result	Attendance	Goalscorers
R3	8 January 2005	Wigan Athletic	H	2–1	14,457	Idiakez, Júnior
R4	29 January 2005	Fulham	H	1–1	22,040	Tudgay
R4R	12 February 2005	Fulham	A	2–4	15,528	Rasiak, Peschisolido

=== League Cup ===
Round	Date	Opponent	Venue	Result	Attendance	Goalscorers
R1	24 August 2004	Lincoln City	A	1–3	4,982	Idiakez

== Squad ==
Note: Flags indicate national team as defined under FIFA eligibility rules; some limited exceptions apply. Players may hold more than one non-FIFA nationality.

No.	Pos.	Nation	Player
1	GK	(England) ENG	Kevin Miller (on loan from Bristol Rovers)
2	DF	(Bosnia and Herzegovina) BIH	Muhamed Konjić
3	DF	(England) ENG	Jamie Vincent
4	DF	(England) ENG	Chris Makin (on loan from Leicester City)
5	DF	(Republic of Ireland) IRL	Jeff Kenna
6	DF	(England) ENG	Pablo Mills
7	MF	(England) ENG	Ian Taylor (captain)
8	MF	(Denmark) DEN	Morten Bisgaard
9	FW	(Brazil) BRA	José Júnior
10	DF	(Jamaica) JAM	Michael Johnson (Note: Johnson was born in Nottingham, England, but also qualified to represent Jamaica internationally and made his international debut for Jamaica in 1999.)
11	FW	(Canada) CAN	Paul Peschisolido
12	FW	(England) ENG	Tommy Smith
13	GK	(England) ENG	Lee Grant
14	DF	(England) ENG	Richard Jackson

No.	Pos.	Nation	Player
15	MF	(England) ENG	Adam Bolder
16	MF	(England) ENG	Tom Huddlestone
17	DF	(England) ENG	Paul Boertien
18	FW	(Poland) POL	Grzegorz Rasiak
19	MF	(England) ENG	Nathan Doyle
20	MF	(England) ENG	Lee Holmes
21	DF	(Northern Ireland) NIR	Chris Turner
22	FW	(Germany) GER	Marco Reich
23	FW	(England) ENG	Marcus Tudgay
24	GK	(England) ENG	Lee Camp (Note: Camp was born in Derby, England, and represented them at U-21 level, but also qualifies to represent Northern Ireland internationally and would make his full international debut for Northern Ireland in March 2011.)
25	MF	(Republic of Ireland) IRL	David Cassidy
26	GK	(England) ENG	Liam Richardson
27	MF	(Spain) ESP	Iñigo Idiakez

=== Left club during season ===
Note: Flags indicate national team as defined under FIFA eligibility rules; some limited exceptions apply. Players may hold more than one non-FIFA nationality.

No.	Pos.	Nation	Player
1	GK	(England) ENG	Andy Oakes (to Walsall)
4	MF	(Nigeria) NGA	Blessing Kaku (on loan from Bolton Wanderers)
4	DF	(England) ENG	Jason Talbot (on loan from Bolton Wanderers)

No.	Pos.	Nation	Player
21	FW	(Peru) PER	Gianfranco Labarthe (released)
26	MF	(Finland) FIN	Kris Weckström (released)
