= Tommy Smith (footballer, born 1980) =

English footballer (born 1980)

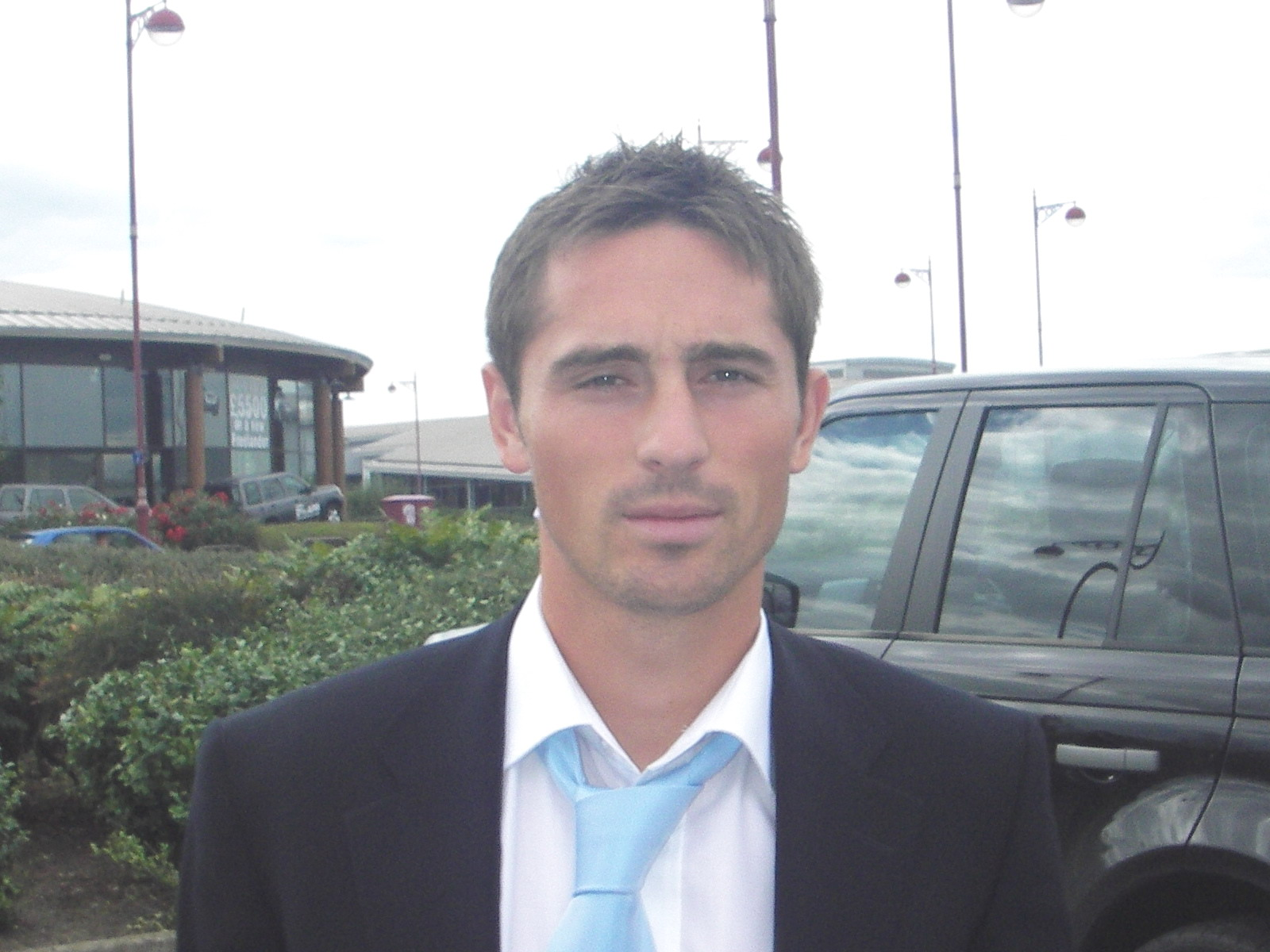
- Smith in 2006

Personal information
- Full name: Thomas William Smith
- Date of birth: 22 May 1980 (age 46)
- Place of birth: Hemel Hempstead, England
- Height: 1.79 m (5 ft 10 in)
- Positions: Right winger; striker

Youth career
- 1995–1997: Watford

Senior career*
Years	Team	Apps	(Gls)
1997–2003	Watford	149	(33)
2003–2004	Sunderland	35	(4)
2004–2006	Derby County	90	(20)
2006–2009	Watford	124	(27)
2009–2010	Portsmouth	19	(1)
2010–2012	Queens Park Rangers	50	(8)
2012–2014	Cardiff City	24	(1)
2014–2015	Brentford	28	(1)
Total		519	(95)

International career
2000	England U21	1	(1)
- * Club domestic league appearances and goals

Thomas William Smith (born 22 May 1980) is an English former professional footballer who played as a right winger or striker.

Smith started his career at Watford, where his younger brother Jack was also a trainee. He played a part in Watford's consecutive promotions from the Second Division, reaching the Premier League in 1999. Although Watford were relegated in 2000, Smith represented his country at under-21 level the following season. He left Watford to join Sunderland on a free transfer in 2003, before moving to Derby County in 2004. He was voted Derby Player of the year in 2006, before re-joining Watford. After the club's relegation in his first season back at Vicarage Road, Smith's subsequent performances earned him consecutive Watford Player of the Season awards in 2007–08 and 2008–09. At the start of the following season he was sold to Premier League club Portsmouth. The club faced administration that season, and were eventually relegated. The following season, Smith joined Championship club Queens Park Rangers, becoming a regular in a team challenging for promotion to the Premier League. Smith joined Brentford in the summer of 2014, spending one season there where he helped them to the Championship play-offs.

== Early and personal life ==
Smith was born in Hemel Hempstead, Hertfordshire. His father Dave, a chartered surveyor and former Watford youth team player, helped coach with the academy during his son's time there. His younger brother Jack, born in 1983, also came through the club's youth system to become a professional player. The pair did not play for Watford together competitively, although they would come within 14 minutes of doing so; Tommy was substituted in the 67th minute of the club's 4–0 win over Brighton & Hove Albion on 26 April 2003, while Jack would make his first-team debut as an 81st-minute substitute. Jack would not make another appearance that season, while Tommy left for Sunderland in the summer.

Smith attended Hemel Hempstead school between 1991 and 1997. He has been with his wife Nina since leaving school. They married in 2005, live in Berkhamsted and have three children. Outside of football, Smith's interests include golf and films. In 2014, he and his brother Jack took over the sales arm of an estate agent and chartered surveyors with its headquarters in Bushey Heath, near Watford.

== Club career ==
=== Watford ===
As a boy Smith trained with Millwall, Sheffield United, who had a base in Amersham, and Watford, who he was with until the age of 12. After only playing for Comets Sports club in Sunday league football for two years, he was given a chance by his father at Watford in a county trial at the age of 14 and signed with them again. Manager Graham Taylor gave Smith his debut for Watford on 18 November 1997, bringing him on as a substitute in a 2–1 Second Division win over Oldham Athletic. Smith did not play another league game in 1997–98, but made eight appearances for Watford as they qualified for the play-offs in the 1998–99 season, where the club gained promotion to the Premiership. He established himself in the team during the club's first Premier League season, making 23 appearances and scoring two goals, including one at Vicarage Road against Manchester United.

Although Watford were relegated in 1999–2000, Smith remained at the club, playing under Gianluca Vialli and Ray Lewington, and scoring on his sole appearance for the England under-21 team in a 6–1 win against Georgia under-21. Watford finished in the bottom half of the First Division for three consecutive seasons, but individually Smith progressed; in 2002–03 he finished as Watford's second highest goalscorer, with nine goals in all competitions. This included crucial goals in Watford's 2003 FA Cup run. His re-taken penalty against Sunderland was the only goal of the fifth round tie, and he also scored the winning goal against Burnley in the quarter-final, having recovered from a car crash. However he was dropped to the bench for Watford's 2003 FA Cup semi-final with Southampton, with on-loan striker Michael Chopra chosen instead. He later admitted that this had left him "devastated".

=== Sunderland ===
Smith chose to leave Watford at the end of the 2002–03 season. However, as he was under the age of 24, he was unable to leave without a fee being paid, and so Watford had to employ him on a monthly contract. He had a two-week trial with Premier League side Charlton Athletic, who did not offer him a contract for financial reasons. He then went on trial with West Ham United, but Glenn Roeder was sacked as manager, and his replacement Alan Pardew chose not to sign him permanently. Smith then spent a week on trial with Italian side Perugia which he "hated". On his return to England he started a trial with Sunderland, subsequently signing a contract in September 2003. Smith spent one season at Sunderland, helping them to finish third in the First Division, after which they lost 5–4 on penalties to Crystal Palace in the play-off semi-finals. For the second consecutive season Smith scored the winning goal in an FA Cup quarter final, and this time he was selected to play in the semi-final, which Sunderland lost 1–0 to Millwall. Smith bought a house in the Sunderland area and anticipated discussing a two-year contract at the end of the 2003–04 season. However, talks stalled and he chose to move to another Championship club, Derby County.

=== Derby County ===
Smith made his Derby debut in a league game against Leeds United. He scored his first goal for the club in a 2–0 victory over Queens Park Rangers. Derby reached the Championship play-offs in Smith's first season at Pride Park. However, they were defeated 2–0 at Preston in the first leg of the semi-finals. In the second leg, at Pride Park, Smith was substituted at half time. The game finished goalless, meaning that Preston progressed to the final. Smith came second in the voting for Player of the year behind Iñigo Idiakez, but did win the inaugural Derbyshire Fair Play award. Derby's form deteriorated in 2005–06, with the club finishing 20th in the table, and eliminated early from both cup competitions. However, this time Smith became the club's Player of the year. At the end of the season, Billy Davies was appointed Derby manager charged with the task of turning the club around and Smith believed that Davies "wanted to bring his own players in." He was close to signing for Sheffield United, before he was the subject of an approach from former club Watford, who had just won promotion to the Premier League. On 30 August 2006, Smith rejoined Watford for a fee of £500k, signing a four-year contract.

=== Return to Watford ===
Smith scored his first league goal of his second spell at Watford on 26 December 2006, against Arsenal at Vicarage Road. However, this wasn't enough to prevent a 2–1 defeat. Watford reached the last four of the FA Cup in 2007, and in contrast to 2003, Smith was selected to start for Watford in the semi-final. However, for the second time in his career Smith was on the losing side, this time 4–1 to Manchester United. At the end of the 2006–07 season Smith finished sixth in the voting for the club's Player of the Season awards, behind runaway winner Ben Foster. However, Watford manager Aidy Boothroyd named Smith as his "outfield player of the season." After relegation from the Premier League, Smith had a successful season in the Championship, with seven goals and nine assists earning him the 2008 Watford Player of the Season award. One of his goals was the equaliser in a 1–1 draw against Blackpool on the last day of the regular season, which secured Watford's place in the 2007–08 Championship play-offs. Smith played in both legs of the semi-finals, where they were defeated 6–1 on aggregate by Hull City.

One of his best seasons was the 2008–09 season, in which he scored seventeen league goals and made nine assists. As well as finishing as the club's top scorer, he was named Player of the Season for the second year running, as Watford finished 13th. Smith made his 300th appearance for Watford in the penultimate game of the season, a 3–2 win away to Coventry City. He started the 2009–10 season in similar form, and was involved in all of Watford's first seven league goals, scoring two and assisting the other five. This was despite ongoing transfer speculation linking Smith with Reading—managed by former Watford manager Brendan Rodgers—as well as other Premier League and Championship clubs, and Watford manager Malky Mackay confirming that the club was considering an offer for him.

=== Portsmouth ===
On 27 August 2009, it was confirmed that Smith had signed a four-year deal with Premier League club Portsmouth for an undisclosed fee believed to be in the region of £1.8m. He later admitted that he was close to signing for Championship side Reading but chose Portsmouth instead. On 30 August 2009, Smith made his Portsmouth debut in a 1–0 defeat to Manchester City at Fratton Park. Portsmouth failed to pay their player's wages on time on three occasions in the 2009–10 season, and Smith was among a number of Portsmouth players linked with a transfer during the January 2010 transfer window. However, due to his five games for Watford, he would have been ineligible to play for another club during the 2009–10 season.

Smith scored his first goal for Portsmouth against Hull City on 20 March 2010. He suffered a broken nose following Daniel Sturridge elbowing him in the face in the following game, and subsequently missed the FA Cup semi-final. However, he recovered to play four further Premier League matches, but was left out of the squad for the FA Cup final. Portsmouth were relegated in 20th position at the end of the season, having been deducted nine points for entering into administration. Despite uncertainty over whether the club would be able to continue as a business, Smith remained at the club. He started their first match of the 2010–11 season on 7 August 2010, a match in which Portsmouth were only able to name four of their permitted seven substitutes.

=== Queens Park Rangers ===
On 31 August, Smith joined Queens Park Rangers on an initial three-month loan deal. His move was made permanent in January 2011, with Smith having agreed a three-year deal for a fee of around £1.5 million. Smith provided the assist for Heiðar Helguson in a 2–1 win against Crystal Palace on 2 October and has since made many positive contributions to the QPR team but found starts hard to come by in the early days of his Rangers career. He scored his first goal for the club against Reading on 6 November, and also netted a late equaliser in a 1–1 draw with former club Portsmouth three days later, scoring a last-minute penalty to earn QPR a point and keep their unbeaten start to the season intact. On 20 August 2011, he scored his and QPR's first goal of the 2011–12 Premier League season, in a 1–0 away win against Everton.

=== Cardiff City ===
On 23 August 2012, Smith signed a two-year contract with Cardiff City for an estimated fee of £350,000. He was given the number 14 shirt, and made his debut two days later on 25 August 2012, in a 2–4 away defeat against Bristol City. On 23 October, Smith suffered a hamstring injury against Watford, which eventually meant that he missed the remainder of 2012. His first goal for Cardiff City came on his first start after returning from his injury on 19 January, and was the winning goal in a 2–1 victory at Blackpool. Smith received another Championship winner's medal as Cardiff won the division in April 2013, but was restricted to three cup appearances during Cardiff's first season in the Premier League. He was released after the Blues' relegation at the end of the 2013–14 season, having made 27 appearances and scored one goal during his two seasons with the club. On 15 July 2014, it was revealed that Smith was training with Championship side Brentford.

=== Brentford and retirement ===
On 7 August 2014, Smith signed a one-year deal with Brentford. Smith scored an 86th-minute equalizer on his Brentford debut against Charlton Athletic in a game that finished 1–1, on 9 August 2014.

After his one-year contract expired, Smith was released by Brentford and subsequently announced his retirement. Since retiring in 2015, Smith has appeared as a guest on Sky Sports' coverage of The Football League and on Channel 5's highlights show, Football League Tonight.

== Playing style ==
As a young child Smith played as a central midfielder, before converting to a striker at age 12. He is a quick player capable of kicking the ball with his weaker left foot, and prefers being part of a team that plays passing football, than one that employs a more direct style. Upon signing him for Portsmouth, then-manager Paul Hart said of Smith:

I've liked Tommy for a long time. He's clever, infectious, enthusiastic and a hard worker. He can play as a centre-forward, behind the centre-forward or out wide, so covers a lot of positions. He's going to be a great asset to us.

== Career statistics ==
Appearances and goals by club, season and competition
Club	Season	League			FA Cup		League Cup		Playoffs		Total	
Club	Season	Division	Apps	Goals	Apps	Goals	Apps	Goals	Apps	Goals	Apps	Goals
Watford	1997–98	Second Division	1	0	1	0	0	0	—		2	0
Watford	1998–99	First Division	8	2	0	0	0	0	0	0	8	2
Watford	1999–2000	Premier League	22	2	0	0	1	0	—		23	2
Watford	2000–01	First Division	43	11	1	0	4	1	—		48	12
Watford	2001–02	First Division	40	11	1	0	4	0	—		45	11
Watford	2002–03	First Division	35	7	5	2	1	0	—		41	9
Watford	Total		149	33	8	2	10	1	0	0	167	36
Sunderland	2003–04	First Division	35	4	4	4	0	0	2	0	41	8
Derby County	2004–05	Championship (Note: The First Division was renamed as the Championship for the start of the 2004–05 season.)	42	11	3	0	0	0	2	0	47	11
Derby County	2005–06	Championship	43	8	2	1	1	0	—		46	9
Derby County	2006–07	Championship	5	1	0	0	1	0	0	0	6	1
Derby County	Total		90	20	5	1	2	0	0	0	99	21
Watford	2006–07	Premier League	32	1	5	1	0	0	—		37	2
Watford	2007–08	Championship	44	7	2	0	0	0	2	0	48	7
Watford	2008–09	Championship	44	17	2	0	3	0	—		49	17
Watford	2009–10	Championship	4	2	0	0	1	0	—		5	2
Watford	Total		124	27	9	1	4	0	2	0	139	29
Portsmouth	2009–10	Premier League	16	1	2	0	0	0	—		18	1
Portsmouth	2010–11	Championship	3	0	0	0	1	0	—		4	0
Portsmouth	Total		19	1	2	0	1	0	—		22	1
Queens Park Rangers	2010–11	Championship	33	6	0	0	0	0	—		33	6
Queens Park Rangers	2011–12	Premier League	17	2	3	0	0	0	—		20	2
Queens Park Rangers	Total		50	8	3	0	0	0	—		53	8
Cardiff City	2012–13	Championship	24	1	0	0	0	0	—		24	1
Cardiff City	2013–14	Premier League	0	0	1	0	2	0	—		3	0
Cardiff City	Total		24	1	1	0	2	0	—		27	1
Brentford	2014–15	Championship	28	1	1	0	2	0	—		31	1
Career total			519	95	33	8	21	1	6	0	579	104

== Honours ==
Queens Park Rangers

- Football League Championship: 2010–11

Cardiff City

- Football League Championship: 2012–13
