= Lionel Pickering =

English businessman

Lionel Victor Pickering (4 December 1931 – 2 September 2006) was an English businessman, best known as the owner of Derby County F.C. between 1991 and 2003. A self-made millionaire, he previously built up a free local newspaper business, making his fortune primarily from the advertising revenue it generated.

== Biography ==
In 1991, Pickering purchased Derby County Football Club for just over £1 million from Robert Maxwell and invested heavily in players over the next two years, spending nearly £10 million.

In January 1992, with Arthur Cox's low budget team just in touch with the leading pack, Pickering embarked on a spending increase, the biggest in the club's history, with the £1million signing of Marco Gabbiadini from Crystal Palace. Joining him in that season were Paul Kitson, Tommy Johnson & Paul Simpson, followed by Steve Sutton, Mark Pembridge, Darren Wassall, Craig Short and Martin Kuhl a year later. Derby were relegated from the old First Division the year Pickering bought the club, and suffered two playoff defeats over the next three seasons which saw them miss out on a place in the new FA Premier League.

In 1995, Pickering appointed Jim Smith in order to change the club's fortunes. With a string of new signings and the hiring of future England and Derby County head coach, Steve McClaren as assistant manager, Smith took the club to the promotion in his first season.

Pickering put Derby at the forefront of English football by building Pride Park Stadium, which was one of the first new stadiums of the modern era to be built by a club in the top two divisions. He also presided over the development of the academy for young footballers at Moor Farm, Oakwood. Derby also finished as high as eighth in the Premier League in 1999.

As the club's fortunes levelled off and subsequently began to slump in the early 2000s, there was a moderate amount of disquiet amongst fans. He went onto Radio Derby and said: "If you can do better, where's your money - and if you don't like it, go and watch Forest.”

Derby were relegated back to Division One in 2002.

In October 2003, Derby County's parent company, Derby County Limited, briefly went into liquidation and Pickering, the majority shareholder, gave way to a new board of John Sleightholme, Jeremy Keith and Steve Harding, who bought the club for £3.

Derby finished 20th in the 2003-2004 First Division campaign, but improved dramatically in the 2004-2005 season and finished 4th in the Football League Championship (the new name for the Football League First Division) and qualified for a promotion play-off spot, losing in the semi-finals to Preston North End.

Lionel died of cancer of the blood, in the Derbyshire Royal Infirmary on Saturday, 2 September 2006, aged 74. He was survived by his three sons, William, Benjamin and Matthew. A one minute's applause at Derby County's following home game against Sunderland on Saturday, 9 September 2006 was held; followed by a memorial service at Derby Cathedral on Tuesday, 26 September 2006. At the request of Mr Pickering's family, attendees were asked to come dressed in Derby County shirts.

The life and work of Lionel was remembered at the first game of the new 2009-10 season and dedicated as ‘Lionel Pickering Day’. A new memorial in his honour, The Lionel Pickering Entrance, was unveiled by his sons. The special construction is an exact replica of the former entrance of the Baseball Ground, using the same bricks and components from the original ground.
