= Pride Park Stadium =

Football stadium

Coordinates: 52°54′54″N 1°26′50″W

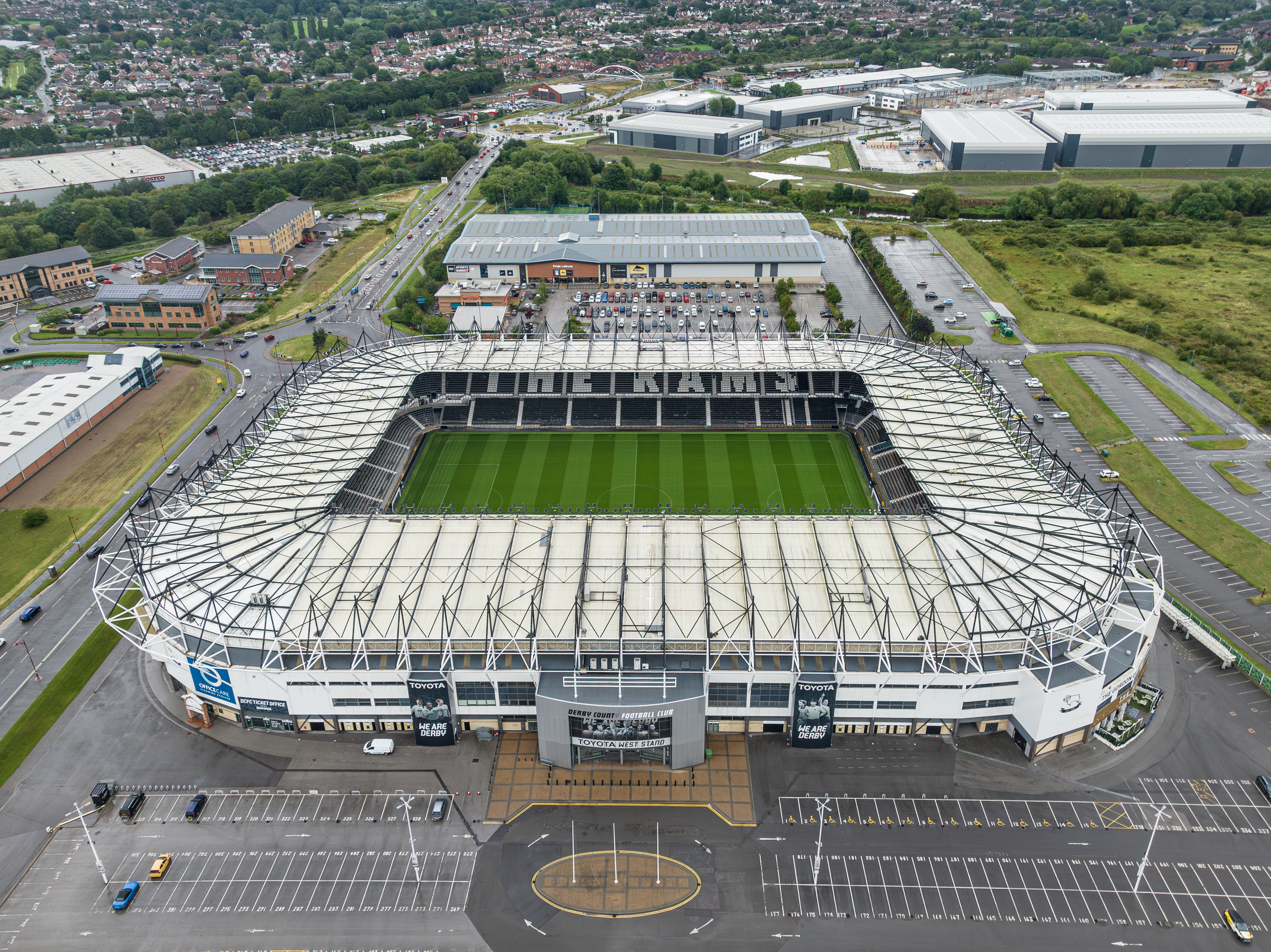
- UEFA
- Interactive map of Pride Park Stadium
- Former names: iPro Stadium (2013–2016)
- Location: Pride Park; Derby; DE24 8XL
- Owner: Derby County F.C.
- Operator: Derby County F.C.
- Capacity: 33,597
- Surface: Grass
- Record attendance: 33,597 (England v. Mexico, 25 May 2001)
- Field size: 105 m × 68 m (344 ft × 223 ft)
- Public transit: Derby (0.7 mi)

Construction
- Opened: 18 July 1997
- Cost: £28 million
- Architect: Miller Partnership

Tenant
- Derby County (1997–present)

Website
- Pride Park Website

Pride Park Stadium is an all-seater football stadium in Derby, England, which is the home ground of English Football League club Derby County. With a capacity of 33,597, it is the 16th largest football ground in England. The stadium is within the Pride Park business park on the outskirts of Derby city centre and was built as part of the commercial redevelopment of the area in the 1990s. Derby County have played at the stadium since it opened in 1997 as a replacement for the Baseball Ground.

Pride Park Stadium has hosted two full men's international matches, England v. Mexico in 2001 and Brazil v. Ukraine in 2010, as well as several England under-21 matches. It has also hosted one full women's international match, England v. Australia in 2025, as well as the 2009 FA Women's Cup final and the 2025 Women's League Cup Final.

== History ==
=== Planning and development ===
Before moving to the Pride Park Stadium, Derby County had played at the Baseball Ground since 1895. Although at its peak the ground had held over 40,000 (the record attendance being 41,826 for a match against Tottenham Hotspur in 1969) the Taylor Report, actioned after the 1989 Hillsborough Disaster, had legally required English football stadia to become all-seater by the 1994–95 season resulting in its capacity dwindling to just 17,500 by the mid-1990s, not enough for the then ambitious second-tier club. An additional problem came with the ground's wooden components (considered unacceptable in the wake of the Bradford City stadium fire in 1985) and, in February 1996, chairman Lionel Pickering made the decision to move the club to a new stadium, having originally planned to rebuild the Baseball Ground as a 26,000-seat stadium, although there had been talk of moving to a new site as long ago as 1991.

The club originally planned to build a purpose-built 30,000-seat stadium at Pride Park, with 4,000 car parking spaces, a restaurant and conference facilities, a fitness centre, a supporters club and a new training ground. A year later the stadium plan was changed to become part of a £46 million project by the Stadivarios group that would also include a 10,000-seat indoor arena. However, Peter Gadsby, the club's associate director at the time and head of the Miller Birch construction company, felt the project was both too ambitious and expensive and instead plans were drawn up by new chairman Lionel Pickering to modernise and extend the Baseball Ground to hold 26,000, at a cost of £10 million. Despite signing a construction agreement with Taylor Woodrow, Gadsby suggested the club make a second attempt at securing the then-redeveloping Pride Park business park, settling with Derby City Council for a smaller site than previously agreed. On 21 February 1996, prior to a match against Luton Town at The Baseball Ground, the club announced to supporters the decision to move to a £16 million state-of-the-art stadium which would hopefully be ready for the start of the 1997–98 season just 18 months later. Construction work began later in 1996.

Derby City Council were paid £1.8 million for the land and the club's four directors – Lionel Pickering, Peter Gadsby, Stuart Webb and John Kirkland – each paid £2.5 million towards a package deal to pay for the stadium. The stadium itself was based upon Middlesbrough's Riverside Stadium, which opened in 1995, though it had more than 30 amendments to the original plans. After toying with the idea of naming the new ground "The New Baseball Ground", it was settled that the club's new home would be called The Pride Park Stadium.

=== Construction ===
Engaging the same architects as Middlesbrough, the Miller Partnership, Derby's plans predominantly followed those of the Riverside Stadium, with the first stage being a detached main stand facing a horseshoe running unbroken round the other three sides, with the possibility of the corners being filled in later and the ground's capacity being increased if and when necessary by raising the horseshoe roof.

"From my youth I only remember this area as railway sidings and a municipal tip and what has happened to Pride Park is wonderful for Derby. So many businesses were attracted to the site once we had moved. I still get a buzz when I arrive for a home game – it’s a dramatic sight, a true county landmark."

— Lionel Pickering

Pickering laid the foundation stone in November 1995 and, after decontamination, the first of the more than 1,000 pre-cast concrete piles was sunk in September 1996. This was followed by 6,500 tonnes of concrete and more than 2,100 tonnes of steelwork as the ground began to take shape. Tapping into the excitement amongst supporters, the club set up a visitors centre which included a computer-generated tour of the stadium taking shape and attracted more than 75,000 fans. The opportunity was also made available for supporters to buy special bricks – on to which they could engrave a message of their choosing – which would be set around the outside of the completed stadium.

The weather of the 1996 winter was not kind to the contractors but extra urgency was provided by the news that the stadium was to be opened by the Queen. This news – the first time the Queen had opened a new football stadium – ensured that the workers, at one point behind schedule, had to pull out all of the stops to get the stadium completed in time. The pitch stood at 105 metres (344 ft) long and 68 metres (223 ft) wide, meeting the requirements for an international venue, and measured five yards (4.6 m) longer and four yards (3.7 m) wider than the pitch at the Baseball Ground. It also came with a three-metre (9.8 ft) grass margin.

=== Opening ===
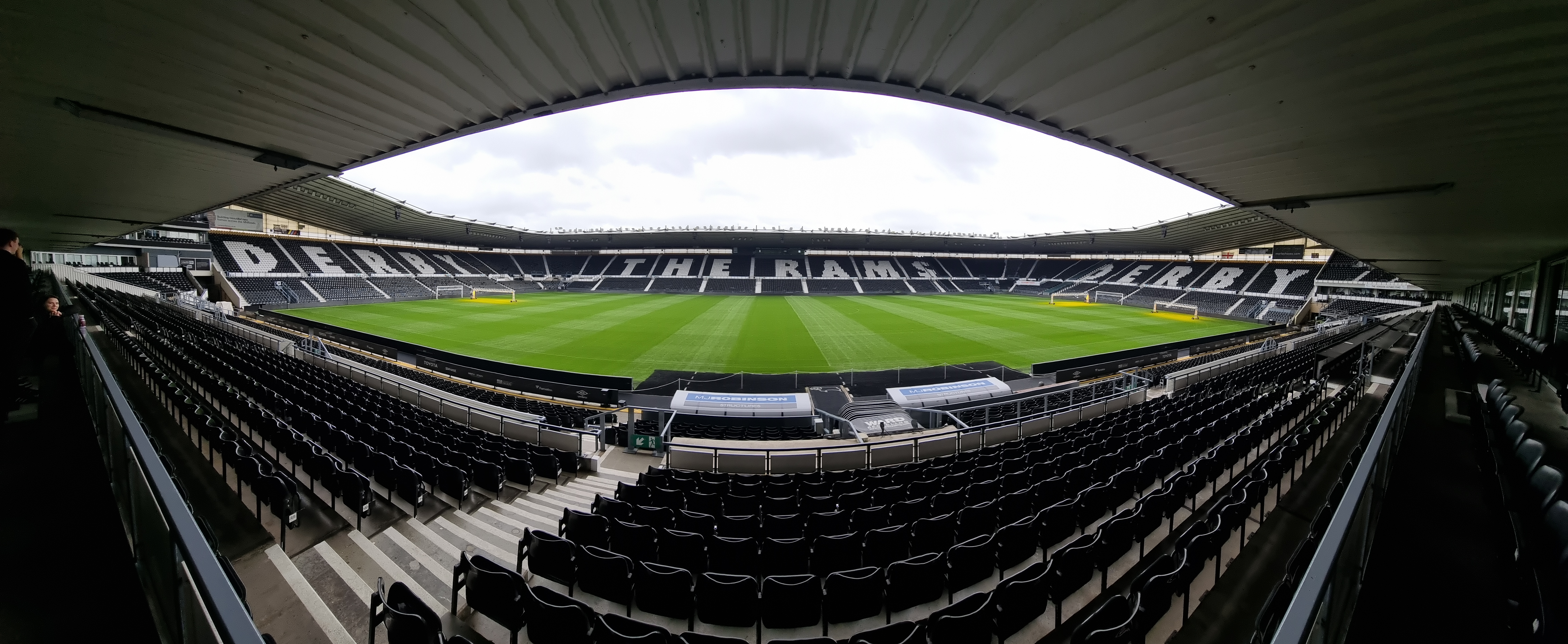
The East Stand in the middle.

The Queen opened the stadium on 18 July 1997 in front of 30,000 spectators. By this time the south west corner, which stood between the main stand and the horseshoe, had been completed. The interest from potential corporate clients had been so high that Pickering pressed the board to go the full distance with the stadium, raising the final initial costs of completing the stadium to £22 million. Work was still in progress on the remaining corner on the opening day, leaving Prince Philip, Duke of Edinburgh to jokingly ask Taylor Woodrow contract manager Ross Walters, "Haven't you been paid yet?" An overture to the opening ceremony came two weeks later, on 4 August 1997, with the first ever game at Pride Park Stadium being played against Italian side Sampdoria, the match ending in a 1–0 defeat with Vincenzo Montella scoring the only goal of the game. The attendance of 29,041 was the highest for a Derby County home game in 20 years. The fixture kicked off a tradition of pre-season friendlies being held against European teams at the ground, with Barcelona (twice), CSKA Moscow, Athletic Bilbao, Lazio, Ajax and Mallorca all visiting the stadium over the next six years.

The stadium's inaugural competitive fixture, a 1997–98 FA Premier League match on 13 August 1997 against Wimbledon in front of 24,571 fans, was called off with the score at 2–1 after the floodlights went out in the 11th minute of the second half. Referee Uriah Rennie, also making his Premier League debut, abandoned the match following a delay of more than half an hour while engineers tried unsuccessfully to restart two failed generators. Gadsby said, "We had 11 maintenance people on duty including six electricians but nobody has yet worked out why both generators failed. There was a bang of such strength that it fused them both." This proved to be the only major problem with the new stadium, which delivered everything which had been promised of it and went on to gain international recognition.

The first competitive fixture to be completed at the new stadium came on 30 August 1997 and ended in a 1–0 win against Barnsley in front of 27,232, with Stefano Eranio scoring the only goal from the penalty spot. Later additions to the ground raised the capacity to 33,597 and a final cost of £28 million.

=== Ownership issues ===
Although the financing of the stadium's construction was carefully structured so that the club paid for and owned the ground without encroaching on funds reserved for the development of the team, the club's eventual relegation from the top flight in 2002 saw it enter financial crisis and eventually it was temporarily entered into receivership by The Co-operative Bank, who instantly installed a new board composed of John Sleightholme, Jeremy Keith and Steve Harding, for the cost of £1 each. Financial circumstances worsened as the debt spiralled to more than £30 million and an unpopular refinancing scheme was put in place which saw the stadium sold to the "mysterious" Panama-based ABC Corporation and the club paying rent of £1 million a year to play there, which local journalist Gerald Mortimer described as "an affront ... to those who put everything into building [the ground]". The ownership trio of Sleightholme, Keith and Harding were nicknamed "The Three Amigos" and, after coming under increasing criticism from Derby's support, in the form of two separate supporters groups, the RamsTrust and the Rams Protest Group (RPG), they eventually sold out to a group of local businessmen, dubbed "The League of Gentlemen" by the local press, led by former board member Peter Gadsby, in April 2006. The Gadsby-led consortium returned Pride Park to club ownership. Three years later, Murdo Mackay, Jeremy Keith and finance director Andrew McKenzie were charged with taking a secret commission worth £440,625 from the club and were sentenced to a combined seven-and-a-half years in prison. In August 2009, the club still owed £15 million on the mortgage of the Pride Park Stadium which was later revealed to be due to be paid off in 2016.

=== Pride Plaza redevelopment and ground expansion ===
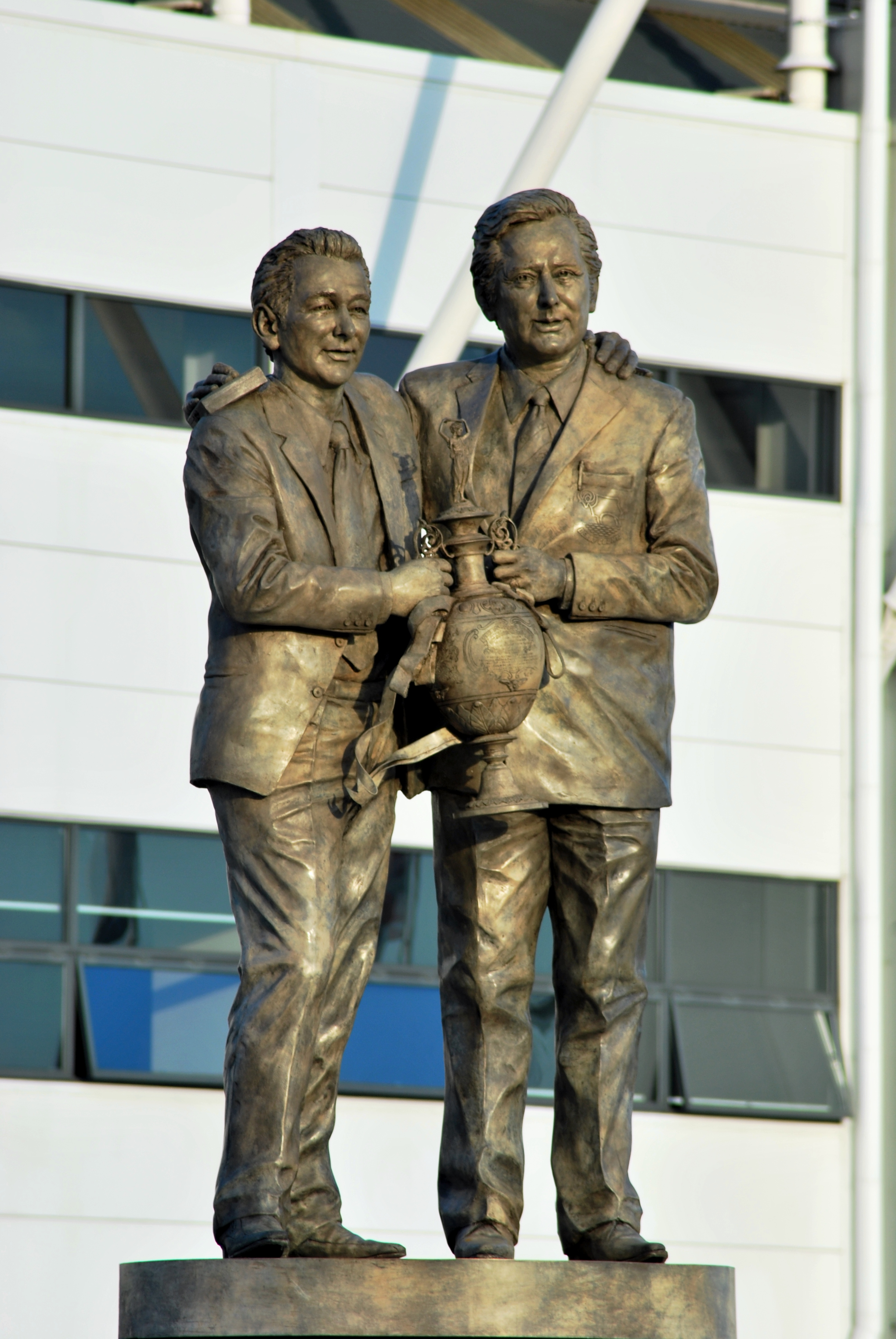
Clough and Taylor statue.

"In the past 10 years Pride Park Stadium has been a big economic driver for Derby, but while the area itself has become the city's main business location, other stadiums have now been built that combine with traditional football facilities new commercial outlets for those clubs and their fans. "When we first built Pride Park we were always aware of further development potential and when I came back to the club almost 12 months ago with the current Board of Directors we indicated we would look to maximise that potential for the benefit of the club.."

— Peter Gadsby

During the 2006–07 season, in which Derby earned promotion back to the Premier League after five years, the club released details of a proposed £20 million development of the area surrounding the stadium, to include the building of a 165-bed hotel, bars, restaurants, office space, and a local service centre for employers located on the Pride Park business park. Three squares would also be introduced which would be named after legendary figures associated with the club: all-time leading goalscorer Steve Bloomer, the club's greatest manager Brian Clough and former chairman Lionel Pickering, who had died in 2006. The club insisted no money would be taken away from the team to pay for the development. On 9 November 2007, Derby City Council approved the plans. Following promotion to the Premier League in the 2006–07 season, the club announced plans to expand the capacity of the stadium up to 44,000 for the start of the 2008–09 season, if the club successfully survived. The plans included adding rows of seats to the north, south and east stands and would have allowed the club to break its current club record attendance. The club, however, failed to maintain its top-flight status and when, in January 2008, it was sold into new American ownership, in the form of General Sports and Entertainment both the plaza plan and the ground expansion initiatives were scrapped.

In 2008, a nine-foot-high bronze statue of Brian Clough and Peter Taylor – who had managed the club between 1967 and 1973 – was commissioned to adorn the north west portion of the ground to be called Unity Plaza. The statue was designed by Andrew Edwards and features both Clough and Taylor holding the League Championship trophy which they won with the club in 1972. It was unveiled on 27 August 2010.

=== 2018 World Cup and 2012 Olympic bids ===
In 2009, Pride Park was earmarked as a possible FIFA World Cup venue when Derby County announced its intention to apply to be one of the host cities as part of England's bid for the 2018 World Cup Finals, with Derby chief executive Tom Glick saying, "What we [the board] know is that Derby already has the core elements to be a host city ... We are going to find out what the requirements are but we are certainly expecting that the requirement would be at least 40,000 seats. The ability to do that at Pride Park Stadium exists, the land exists. So we know that if we were successful, that is something that could be done."

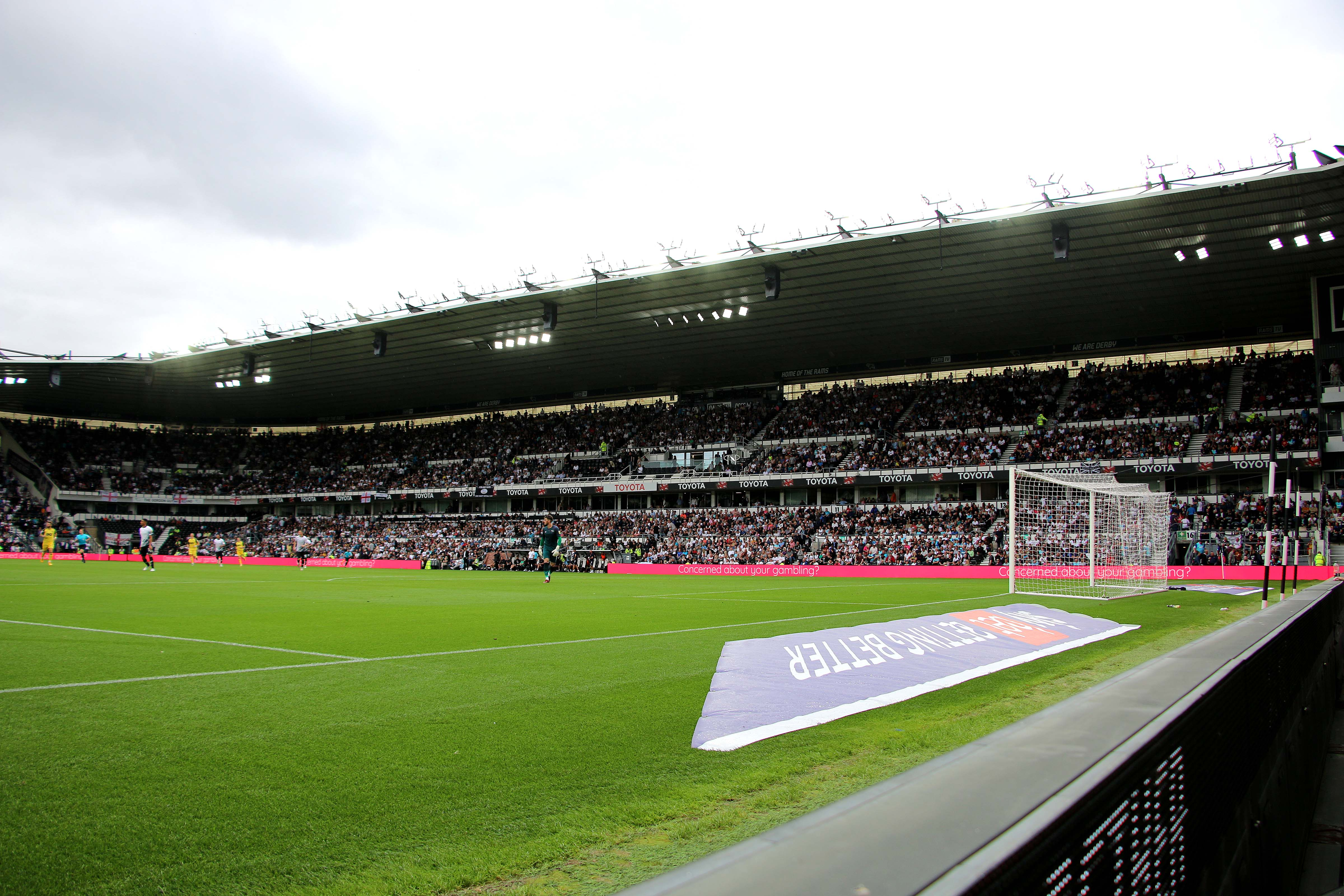
The West Stand.

To qualify as a host stadium, the ground would need to expand to at least 40,000 capacity and the club announced that three methods could be undertaken to achieve this, two of which would leave the stadium permanently expanded. Option A would see the additional capacity supplied by temporary stands erected behind each goal, removing the current roof, and be supported by steel structures, with all the stands removed after the World Cup and the original roofing replaced. Option B would also see temporary seating built in the north and south stands as well as an additional structure placed on the east stand which the club could choose to keep, increasing the capacity to 39,000. The final Option, C, would see the removal of seating from the north, south and east stands and three new 20 row decks placed in each stand. This again came with the option of retaining the east stand expansion, raising the stadium capacity to a permanent 37,000. The club itself stated that it preferred to explore temporary, rather than permanent, expansion, saying "We'd like to meet the World Cup standards for matches when it comes to expansion but then perhaps scale down the stadium to something closer to where we are right now. That way, we can keep the intimacy and special atmosphere that has almost become a hallmark of going to a Derby County match. When the team play at home, having a full stadium is a huge advantage because it creates a brilliant atmosphere. What we wouldn't want to do is have a stadium that all of a sudden was too big after the World Cup had gone." On 16 December 2009, Derby's campaign was rejected by the FA, along with Hull and Leicester, in favour of a bid by local rivals Nottingham Forest. Tom Glick later commented, "We're all greatly disappointed. Thousands of hours of hard work has been put in across the city from a number of agencies. We need to get some feedback as to why the bid was not successful."

The club was later unsuccessful in its attempt to be the Midlands football venue for the 2012 Summer Olympics, losing out to Coventry City's Ricoh Arena, with the selection committee citing the fact the stadium "has fewer dressing rooms and no hotel" in comparison to the Coventry-based stadium.

=== Additional ground developments ===
On 17 January 2009, a bust of Steve Bloomer was unveiled next to the home dugout.

=== The Plaza @ Pride Park development ===
On 3 October 2011, Derby County announced that they had submitted plans to Derby City Council for a £7 million development of land outside the stadium, which the club named "The Plaza @ Pride Park".

These plans included five cafes/restaurants, two convenience stores and 2,000 square metres of office space. These plans had been scaled down from the planned £20 million pound development proposed in 2007. Derby County CEO Tom Glick said that these plans would help the club deal with the new Financial Fair Play regulations which were to be introduced in the Football League from 2012, as revenue from the plaza would be reinvested back into the club.

This planned development also coincided with a plan from the city council to build a multi-use sports arena on the same site as the proposed plaza.

On 12 January 2012, Derby City Council's planning control committee gave planning permission for the development. Chief executive Tom Glick said that the club had moved to the next stage of the development, finding a development company to build the plaza.

It was announced on 3 May 2013 that the first phase was to be launched after the last game of the 2012–13 season when Derby County faced Millwall. Located in the north east corner of the stadium and close to the DCFC megastore, the initial phase would provide a mixture of retail and restaurant units totalling 7,000 sq.ft. The development was being undertaken jointly by the club and Cedar House Investments, part of former chairman Peter Gadsby's Ark Capital group of companies. John Vicars, chief operating officer at Derby County, welcomed the launch by saying, "We see this development attracting perhaps a convenience retailer, and a restaurant to complement the facilities already available on Pride Park and to provide a greater choice. With the opening of the new multi-use sports arena and velodrome adjacent to the club, there will be even greater demand for these facilities." Peter Gadsby said: "The area is already a proven destination for leading occupiers including Greggs, Frankie & Benny's, Subway and Starbucks. I am particularly keen that this scheme will add to the success of Pride Park and provide further amenities for the 10,000 people that are working in the area. It is good news that this phase of the development will create a further 25 jobs."

=== Renaming the stadium ===
On 7 December 2013, Pride Park was renamed the iPro Stadium in a £7 million sponsorship deal with global sports drink company iPro. The club announced the cancellation of the sponsorship deal on 18 November 2016, with the stadium's name reverting to Pride Park.

=== More ownership issues (2018–2025) ===
During the 2017–18 season, Derby County sold Pride Park to club owner Mel Morris for £80 million, this allowed the club to make a £14.6m million pound profit which helped the club keep within FFP regulations. Derby would later defend the valuation of the stadium sale; however the English Football League for who Derby were a member of and oversaw the FFP regulations charged Derby County with breach of financial regulations in January 2020 over the stadium sale and valuation. In September 2021, Derby County entered administration; but Pride Park Stadium was not part of the administration and remained under the control of Morris. In November 2021, Derby's administrators admitted the EFL charge in regards to the stadium sale to Morris and Derby were deducted nine points from the 2021–22 EFL Championship table due to recalculated breaches of FFP regulations from the EFL's view regarding the overvaluation of Pride Park. During Chris Kirchner's failed takeover of Derby in May 2022, the stadium ownership was seen as an issue with Kirchner unwilling to purchase the stadium. A ground share with Leicester City or Stoke City was proposed, as well as Derby City Council purchasing the stadium of Morris and Derby becoming tenants to Pride Park.

On 24 June 2022, Derbyshire-based property developer David Clowes purchased Pride Park and made a bid for the football club to the administrators, his company Clowes Developments (UK) Ltd became the new owners of Pride Park Stadium. On 1 July 2022, Clowes became owner of Derby County. The stadium and club were both owned by Clowes Developments (UK) Ltd, but were held under separate legal entities with the club in Derby County (The Rams) Limited and Pride Park in Gellaw Newco 202 Limited. On 14 May 2025, it was announced by Derby County that these holding companies would be merged, so the football club would own Pride Park Stadium again.

== Records ==
The highest attendance at Pride Park for a competitive Derby County match is 33,378 in the Premier League against Liverpool on 18 March 2000.

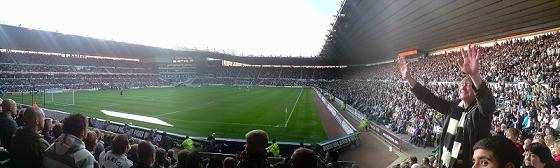
Panorama taken from the South Stand.

In a testimonial for Ted McMinn, on 1 May 2006, former players of both Derby County and Rangers contested a match at Derby County's Pride Park Stadium in which a record 33,475 spectators attended – around 10,000 of them being Rangers fans.

== Average league attendance ==
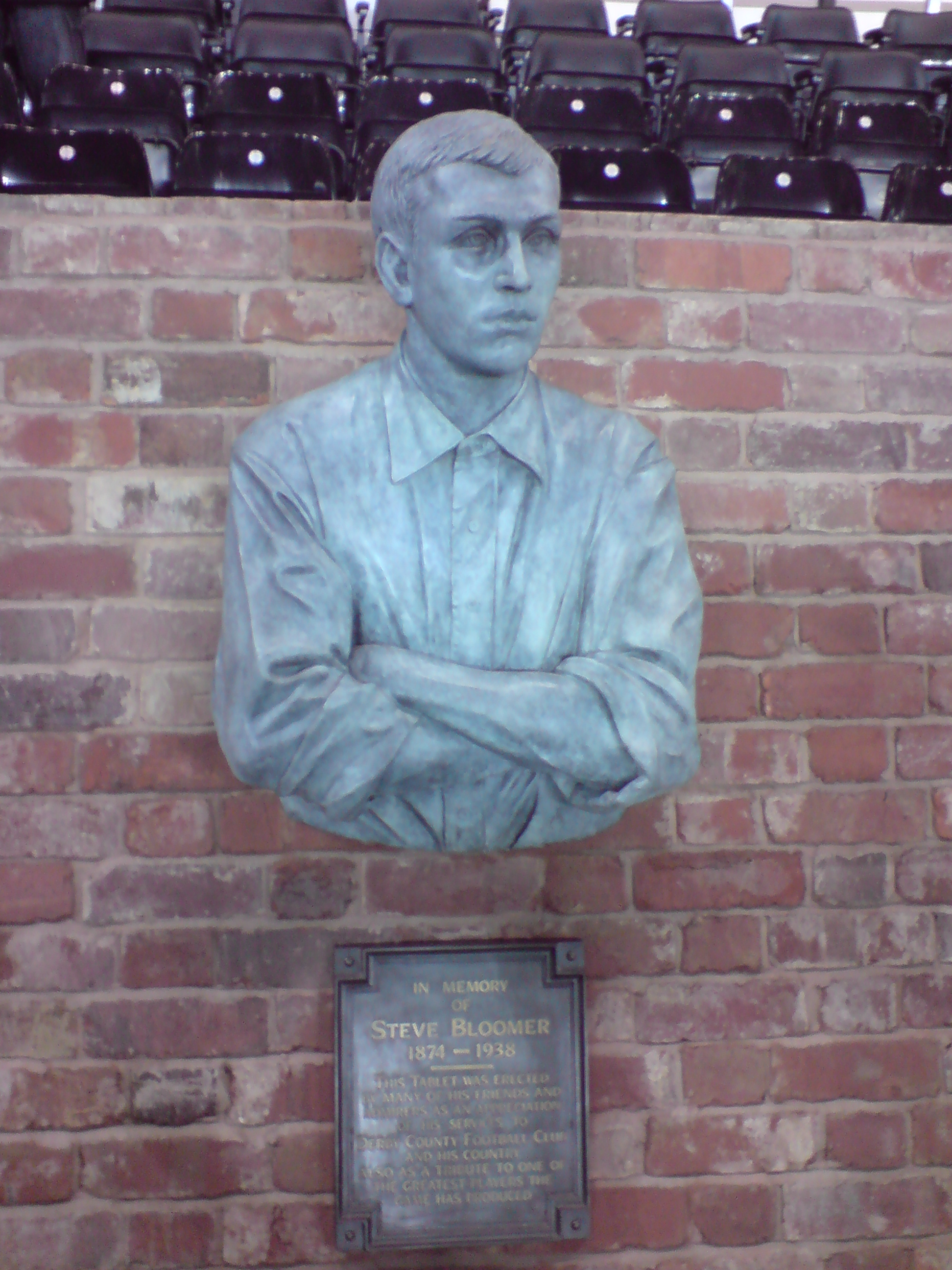
The bust of Steve Bloomer (1874–1938), located adjacent to the home team's dugout

Season	Average attendance	Division	Position
1997–98	29,105	FA Premier League	9th
1998–99	29,195	FA Premier League	8th
1999–2000	29,351	FA Premier League	16th
2000–01	28,551	FA Premier League	17th
2001–02	29,816	FA Premier League	19th (R)
2002–03	25,470	Football League First Division	18th
2003–04	22,330	Football League First Division	20th
2004–05	25,219	Football League Championship	4th
2005–06	24,166	Football League Championship	20th
2006–07	25,945	Football League Championship	3rd (P)
2007–08	32,432	Premier League	20th (R)
2008–09	29,445	Football League Championship	18th
2009–10	29,230	Football League Championship	14th
2010–11	26,023	Football League Championship	19th
2011–12	26,020	Football League Championship	12th
2012–13	23,263	Football League Championship	10th
2013–14	24,933	Football League Championship	3rd
2014–15	29,234	Football League Championship	8th
2015–16	29,663	Football League Championship	5th
2016–17	29,042	Football League Championship	9th
2017–18	27,175	Football League Championship	6th
2018–19	26,626	Football League Championship	6th
2019–20	26,727 (Note: Due to the Covid-19 pandemic, the home games versus Reading, Nottingham Forest, Brentford & Leeds United were played behind closed doors. Average calculated for the 19 matches for which attendance was permitted.)	Football League Championship	10th
2020–21	n.a. (Note: Due to the Covid-19 pandemic, Derby's entire home campaign was played behind closed doors.)	Football League Championship	21st
2021–22	23,010	Football League Championship	23rd (R)
2022–23	27,259	Football League One	7th
2023–24	27,278	Football League One	2nd (P)
2024–25	29,018	Football League Championship	19th
2025–26	28,911	Football League Championship	8th

== Non-Derby County matches ==
As one of the largest football grounds in the Midlands, Pride Park Stadium has also hosted some notable matches not connected to Derby County.

Pride Park Stadium has hosted one full England men's international: a 4–0 friendly victory over Mexico on 25 May 2001, when the national side toured the country during the building of the new Wembley Stadium. The match also holds the record for the highest attendance at the stadium: a full-house of 33,597.

On 28 October 2025, Pride Park Stadium hosted its first England women's team match, where the Lionesses beat Australia 3–0 in a friendly match.

The ground has hosted six England U21 matches. The results were as follows:

Date	Opponents	Result	Attendance	Part of
9 February 1999	France	2–1	32,865	International friendly
6 October 2000	Germany	1–1	30,155	2002 UEFA European Under-21 Championship qualification#Group 9
13 November 2001	Netherlands	1–0	32,418	2002 UEFA European Under-21 Championship qualification#Play-offs
8 February 2005	Netherlands	1–2	33,184	International friendly
6 February 2007	Spain	2–2	28,295	International friendly
5 March 2014	Wales	1–0	6,000	UEFA European U-21 Championship qualifying

Partly as a result of Derby's successful hosting of international U21 football, Pride Park was selected as a host venue as part of the English bid to host the 2013 European U21s Championship.

Away from the England national side, the stadium hosted a friendly between Brazil and Ukraine on 11 October 2010. The match ended in a 2–0 victory for Brazil, with Dani Alves and Alexandre Pato scoring the goals, in front of a crowd of 13,088 live spectators and TV viewers in over 100 countries. Though Brazil coach Mano Menezes bemoaned the low turnout ("I expected more fans but I think it was a good game"), Derby chief executive Tom Glick declared himself relatively pleased with the turnout, saying "I think everybody was hoping that we'd have a sold out crowd of over 30,000 but, realistically, time was working against us. We only had 13 days to sell the tickets and a big crowd just wasn't on the cards. But I think we've proven that we can turn it around, operationally. The promoter, Kentaro, has seen that. So we have done ourselves a favour in terms of bringing something else like this back again and we will continue to pursue things like this."

On 4 May 2009 Pride Park Stadium hosted the 39th FA Women's Cup Final, which saw Arsenal run out 2–1 victors over Sunderland to win the cup for a record fourth consecutive time, in front of a crowd of 23,291. The stadium also hosted the 2024–25 Women's League Cup Final, becoming the largest capacity stadium to date to host the event, though the quality of the pitch on the day was criticised. In May 2025, the pitch was replaced after it had reached its nine-year lifespan.

== Notable non-football events ==
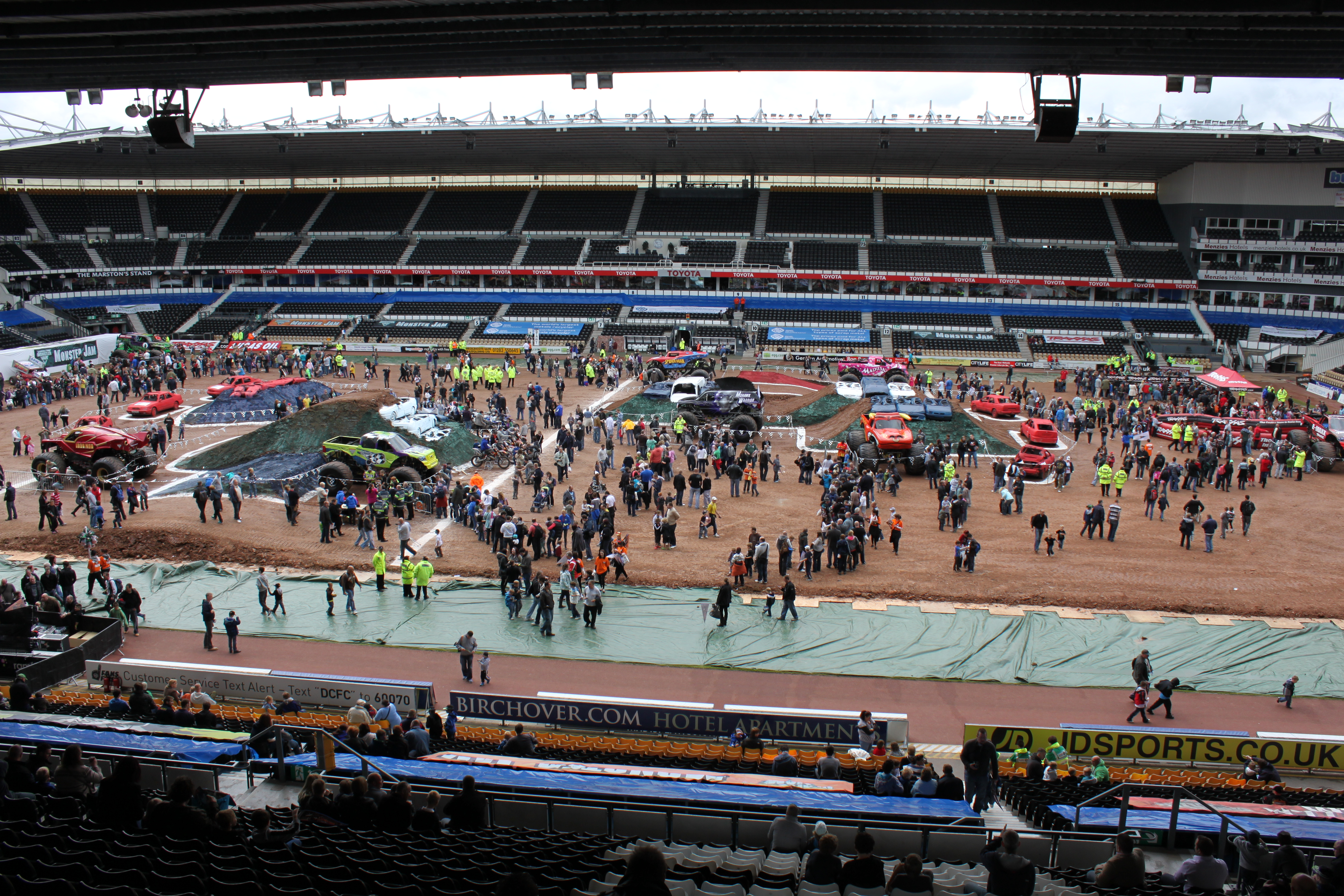
Monster Jam at Pride Park Stadium

Although primarily a football venue, Pride Park Stadium has also hosted events away from sport. It first hosted singer Rod Stewart on 26 June 2005 while touring his Stardust: The Great American Songbook, Volume III album. This was followed by the Red Hot Chili Peppers, who played at the ground as part of the tour for their Stadium Arcadium album on 5 June 2006. Monster Jam came to Pride Park Stadium on 28 and 29 May 2011.
