= Marco Reich =

German footballer (born 1977)

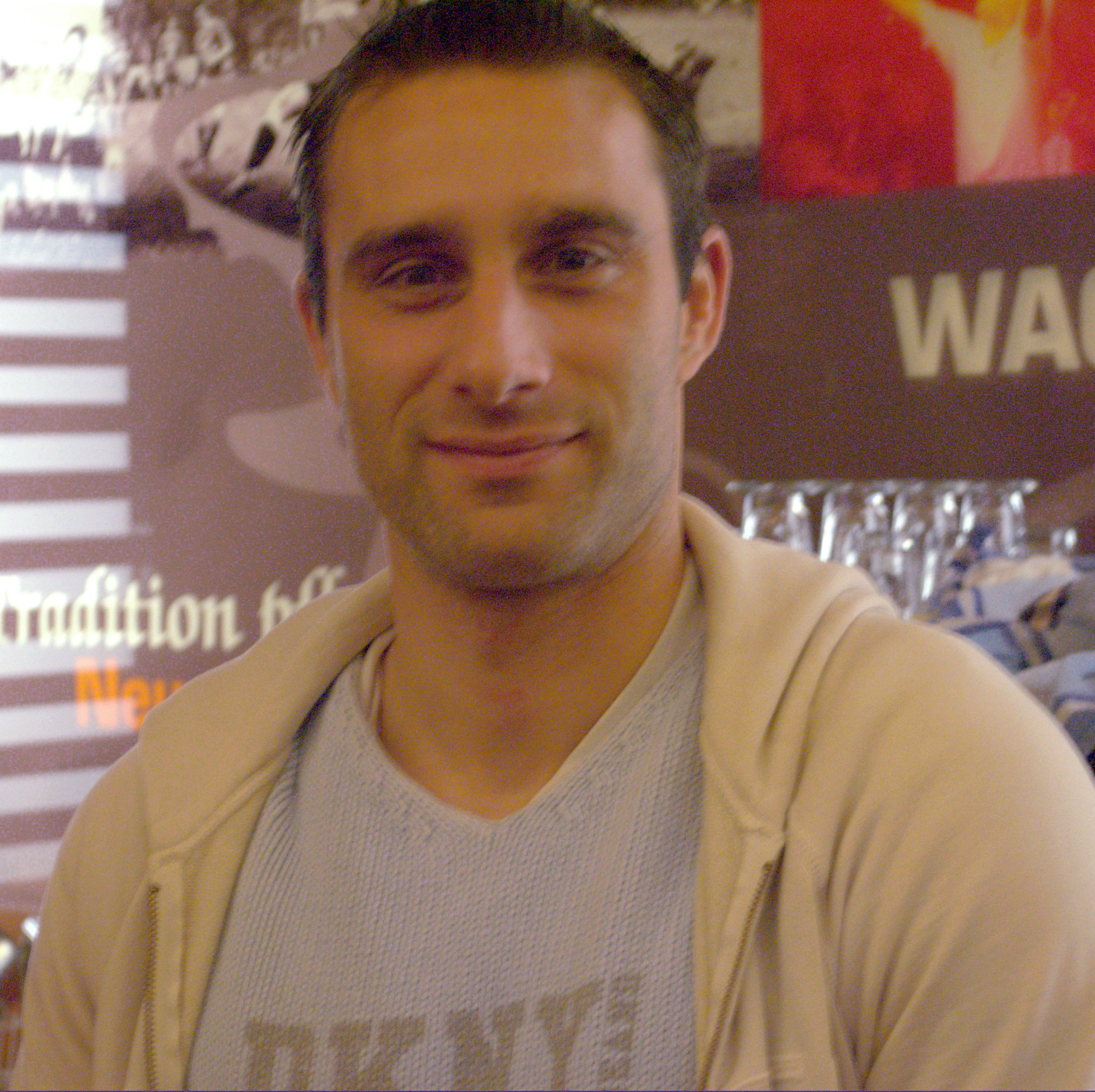
- Reich in 2010

Personal information
- Full name: Marco Franzisco Thomas Reich
- Date of birth: 30 December 1977 (age 48)
- Place of birth: Meisenheim, West Germany
- Height: 1.84 m (6 ft 0 in)
- Positions: Midfielder; winger

Senior career*
Years	Team	Apps	(Gls)
1996–2001	1. FC Kaiserslautern	138	(12)
2001–2002	1. FC Köln	24	(0)
2002–2004	Werder Bremen	17	(0)
2004–2005	Derby County	50	(7)
2005–2007	Crystal Palace	27	(2)
2007–2008	Kickers Offenbach	17	(0)
2008–2009	Walsall	19	(3)
2009	Jagiellonia Białystok	15	(2)
2010–2011	WAC St. Andrä	42	(15)
2011–2012	SK Austria Klagenfurt	24	(8)
2012–2013	Villacher SV	26	(11)
Total		399	(60)

International career
1997–1998	Germany U21	11	(2)
1999	Germany	1	(0)
- * Club domestic league appearances and goals

Marco Reich (born 30 December 1977) is a German former professional footballer who played as a midfielder or winger.

== Club career ==
=== 1. FC Kaiserslautern ===
Reich made his professional debut in October 1996 with 1. FC Kaiserslautern in the 2. Bundesliga and subsequently played five seasons for the club, four of them in the Bundesliga after they were promoted there in 1997. He also won the Bundesliga champions title with Kaiserslautern in 1998.

=== 1. FC Köln and Werder Bremen ===
In the summer of 2001, Reich moved to league rivals 1. FC Köln for a transfer fee of €3 million. He spent one season with the club, making 24 Bundesliga appearances without scoring a goal.

He then moved to another Bundesliga club, Werder Bremen, for a transfer fee of €250,000, subsequently spending one season and a half with the club, but only making 17 league appearances – 16 as a substitute – with no goals scored. He left the Werder Bremen in the 2003–04 winter transfer window while the club went on to win both the league and cup titles.

=== In England: Derby County and Crystal Palace ===
In January 2004, Reich moved to Derby County of then Football League First Division after trialling with the club. On 1 May 2004, he helped secure the club's survival in the league with a free-kick goal.

On 14 August 2004, he contributed a brace to Derby County's 3–2 defeat of Ipswich Town, their first win of the 2004–05 season. On 18 September, he scored once in 2–0 win away to Cardiff City. Four days later, he netted again in a 3–1 loss away to Millwall. By mid-November, he had amassed five goals and eight assists in 16 matches and interest from Tottenham was reported. In early February 2005, the club's captain Ian Taylor mentioned Reich's signing as one of manager George Burley's "really good foreign free transfers". On 3 May 2005, Reich scored an injury-time equaliser for 3–3 having been brought on late as a substitute in a league match against Wolverhampton Wanderers. At the end of the 2004–05 season Derby County missed out on promotion to the Premier League and Reich was one of four players to be released from work duties and declared free to join a club.

In summer 2005, it was erroneously reported that Reich had joined Red Star Belgrade on a two-year contract. In September 2005, he joined Crystal Palace. On 20 September, he scored the match's only goal in his club's 1–0 win against Coventry City. In early October, he scored a brace against Queens Park Rangers. Having initially signed on a short-term, three-month contract, Reich was later rewarded with a long-term contract for his performances. The highlight of his time at Palace was arguably when he scored the winning goal to reach the last 16 of the 2005–06 Football League Cup at the expense of European champions Liverpool.

=== Offenbach, Walsall, and Jagiellonia Białystok ===
In January 2007, Reich returned to Germany, signing a 1 1/2-year with 2. Bundesliga side Kickers Offenbach on a free transfer. He was released by Offenbach following their relegation from the second tier of German football.

He trialled with Walsall before joining on a free transfer in August 2008 signing a six-month contract. He scored the equalising goal in Walsall's 2–1 win against Scunthorpe on 16 August 2008. He was released in January 2009.

On 2 May 2009, he signed a contract with Jagiellonia Białystok. He was later critical of the standard of football in the Ekstraklasa, comparing it to the lower divisions of the German League, although he did speak favourably about teams like Wisła Kraków and Lech Poznań.

=== In Austria: WAC St. Andrä and SK Austria Klagenfurt ===
In January 2010, Reich signed for Austrian club WAC St. Andrä whom he helped to promotion to the second-tier Austrian Football First League in his first half-season. In the 2010–11 season he scored ten goals and gave nine assists in 29 matches contributing to a fourth-place finish. Nevertheless, he was told by coach and former teammate at 1. FC Kaiserslautern Nenad Bjelica to look for a new club with one year left on his contract.

In the 2011–12 season he scored eight goals in 24 matches for SK Austria Klagenfurt, reaching sixth place in Austria's third tier.

In summer 2012, he signed for Villacher SV.

== International career ==
Having previously represented the Germany U-21 team, Reich made his debut for the senior side, playing 78 minutes in their 3–3 draw with Colombia in a friendly match played in Miami, Florida on 9 February 1999. The match in the Southern United States remained his only cap for the full national team.

== Honours ==
1. FC Kaiserslautern

- Bundesliga: 1997–98
- DFB-Pokal: 1995–96

Werder Bremen

- Bundesliga: 2003–04

Jagiellonia Białystok

- Polish Cup: 2009–10
