= Murdo Mackay =

Scottish businessman and sports agent (born 1956)

Murdo Mackay (born 1956) is a Scottish businessman and sports agent. He worked as director of football at Derby County F.C. between October 2003 and March 2006. In July 2009 Mackay was convicted of fraudulently claiming money from the club as commission for brokering a loan and was sentenced to three years in prison.

== Personal life ==
Mackay's family came from an island in the Outer Hebrides, although by the time he was six years old, they had moved to the Partick area of Glasgow. He grew up with a keen interest in football, particularly Rangers F.C. whom he supported.

== Career ==
As well as serving in the Royal Navy for a time, Mackay became directly involved in football, playing in the Highland Football League, gaining coaching qualifications, and then working as a players' agent. In this capacity, Mackay represented the majority of the Rangers first team squad during the 1990s.

Despite being a FIFA–registered agent for what he himself described as "11 unblemished years", Mackay's business ventures met with mixed fortunes. He has been a director of five companies that have been struck off the Companies House register, mostly for failure to file accounts or an annual return. From 1993 to 1996, Mackay was made personally bankrupt after the failure of his recruitment agency, MMK Associates, when 19 creditors, ranging from Inland Revenue to a furniture loan company, were left owed £157,659. In 2001, he launched Inside Soccer Recruitment, an innovative player recruitment agency, only for it to be liquidated 16 months later, owing a large tax bill and leaving creditors, including former footballer Terry Butcher, unpaid. Mackay commented, "Inside Soccer was a great idea which didn't work. These things happen and I lost more money than anyone".

Mackay also worked for a time in 2007 as a consultant to Stirling-based sports management company 110Sport.

== Derby County ==
In October 2003 Mackay became involved in a takeover of financially troubled Football League First Division club Derby County. A group of investors who wished to remain anonymous had purchased the club following it being placed into temporary receivership by the Co-operative Bank and had installed barrister John Sleightholme as chairman. Sleightholme was a friend of Mackay's, the two being the only directors of a company called Finance for Football, which had been launched in 2002. Mackay's role at Derby was initially unspecified, although it was thought that he helped with attracting investment. He was subsequently appointed to the director of the football role, and with his contacts in international football was instrumental in recruiting players such as Grzegorz Rasiak and Iñigo Idiakez for the club.

Mackay, however, reportedly had a poor relationship with George Burley, the manager who led Derby to a play-off place in 2004–05, with rumours of disagreements and meddling in team affairs by Mackay. Burley subsequently resigned from his post in June 2005 stating his position had become "untenable". Mackay offered his resignation from the board in the wake of Burley's departure but was persuaded to stay after talks. The following season, Mackay had a public dispute with Derby County's chief executive, Jeremy Keith, over the sale of Rasiak to Tottenham Hotspur, for which he was reprimanded by Sleightholme.

Following further disagreements with Keith and other board members, Mackay tendered his verbal resignation in December 2005. In a subsequent vote, the Derby directors voted four to one in favour of Mackay leaving, with his only supporter being friend and club chairman Sleightholme. However, Mackay made a U-turn and clung to his post by claiming no written resignation was ever given to the board. Mackay eventually left his post at Derby County on 22 March 2006, claiming he could leave with his head held high.

== Fraud conviction ==
Mackay was charged on 12 November 2007 with conspiracy to defraud and concealing criminal property after police investigations in Derby County. Former chief executive Jeremy Keith and finance director Andrew Mackenzie were charged with similar offences. Murdo appeared at Southern Derbyshire Magistrates' Court in Derby on 27 November 2007. Charges were read out, no pleas were entered and the case was adjourned. The trial started at Northampton Crown Court on 2 March 2009. Prior to the court case, Mackay left Scotland to live in Alicante, Spain. Mackay and Mackenzie were found guilty and claimed thousands of pounds in "commission" for brokering a loan for the club.

On 20 July 2009, Mackay and Mackenzie were both sentenced to 3 years in prison by Judge Alexander at Northampton Crown Court. On 29 January 2010, in the Royal Courts of Appeal in London, the sentence was reduced to 18 months.
