= Mel Morris (businessman) =

English businessman (born 1956)

Mel Morris CBE
- Born: February 1956 (age 70); Derbyshire, United Kingdom
- Occupation: Entrepreneur
- Years active: 2003–2004; 2015–2021
- Known for: Successful investment in the maker of mobile game Candy Crush Saga and ill fated ownership of Derby County

Melvyn Morris CBE is an English businessman and the CEO and co-founder of Corpora.ai, an AI research engine.

Morris gained a large part of his fortune through his successful startup investment in King, the firm behind the mobile game Candy Crush Saga.

Morris is also known for his disastrous tenure as owner of Derby County. His ownership resulted in huge debts being accrued and ultimately ended in the club’s relegation to the third tier of English football for only the third time since the club's formation in 1884. The club also almost went out of existence until an eleventh hour rescue by local businessmen David Clowes

== Early life ==
Morris was born and raised in Derby.

== Career ==
Out of school, he first worked as a tile and flooring manager at a company he helped to establish in Spain, before venturing into entrepreneurship. After leaving the flooring firm, he returned to the UK to develop a dating website called uDate, which he went on to sell for £100 million. He used the money secured from the sale to invest in Prevx, an internet security firm, which was later sold to Webroot. He then helped to set up King, which he chaired from 2003 onwards until stepping down in 2014. When King was sold to Activision Blizzard, Morris collected £450 million.

According to the Sunday Times Rich List in 2020, Morris was said to have amassed a fortune of £515 million, making him the joint 268th richest person in the UK, and the joint 11th richest in the East Midlands.

Morris was appointed Commander of the Order of the British Empire (CBE) in the 2017 Birthday Honours for services to business and charitable services.

Morris launched Corpora.ai in beta in December 2024. Corpora.ai is an AI research engine that scours academic papers, news articles, patents and any other information available freely on the internet to create detailed research documents in response to user prompts in seconds. Corpora.ai processes two million documents per second. Morris has invested $15M into Corpora.ai.

== Derby County ==
Morris bought a 22% stake in Derby County in May 2014, shortly after the club's 2014 Football League Championship play-off final defeat to Queens Park Rangers. He was involved in a league-wide push to increase TV revenue for non-Premier League clubs.

The following season, he assumed ownership of the club, overseeing unprecedented levels of spending, including breaking the club's transfer record four times in his first three years. He also oversaw an equally unprecedented managerial turnover, with nine managers appointed between June 2015 and May 2021. In this period, the club endured three unsuccessful play-off campaigns, failing in the semi-finals twice and losing in the 2019 final to Aston Villa. In May 2021, the club narrowly avoided relegation.

Earlier, in October 2020, it was announced that Morris was intending to sell the club and was actively seeking new owners. After two unsuccessful attempts by Morris to sell the club, the board of directors announced in September 2021 that the club was to go into administration. Then Derby manager Wayne Rooney stated he was not informed by Morris the club were entering administration, instead finding out via Sky News. Administration resulted in a total deduction of twenty-one points, which led to the club's relegation from the EFL Championship and put the club at risk of being wound up.
