= John Sleightholme =

John Sleightholme was the chairman of Derby County Football Club. He is a barrister and deputy coroner, and was nominally made chairman and owner of two-thirds of Derby County in October 2003, in a move arranged by Murdo Mackay. There were also two other directors, Jeremy Keith, who owned one-third of the club, and Steve Harding. Mackay soon became more formally involved by Sleightholme, and he was promoted to director of football.

In early 2006, the club was facing a boardroom battle between Sleightholme and Keith. Following protests by the Rams Protest Group and RamsTrust, it didn't seem that Sleightholme and Keith would be chairman and chief executive respectively for much longer and, indeed, in April 2006, Sleightholme resigned, stating "My position has been made untenable. Recently it has come to my attention that meetings have been held, important decisions taken and documents signed without my knowledge. Important information has been withheld from me." Keith himself departed later in the month, to be replaced by a new board led by Peter Gadsby.

In March 2009, Sleightholme gave evidence in the court case against Jeremy Keith, Murdo Mackay, Derby County's former finance director Andrew MacKenzie, accountant Mark Waters and solicitor David Lowe who were all charged in relation to a fraud allegation centred on a loan from a Panama-based company that effectively saved Derby County after their relegation from the Premiership. Mackenzie, Keith, Mackay and Lowe were subsequently jailed for their involvement. Neither Sleightholme or Steve Harding, were implicated in the fraud, not charged with any offence, while Waters was found innocent
