= Iñigo Idiakez =

Spanish footballer and manager

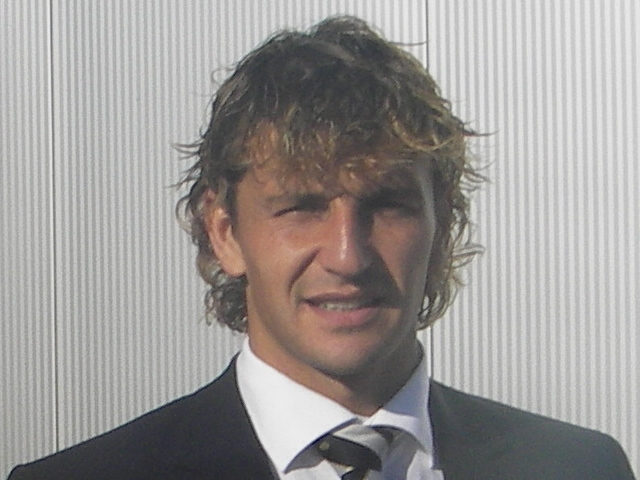
- Idiakez in 2005

Personal information
- Full name: Iñigo Idiakez Barkaiztegi
- Date of birth: 8 November 1973 (age 52)
- Place of birth: San Sebastián, Spain
- Height: 1.83 m (6 ft 0 in)
- Positions: Attacking midfielder; forward

Youth career
- 1989–1992: Real Sociedad

Senior career*
Years	Team	Apps	(Gls)
1992–1995	Real Sociedad B	64	(25)
1992–2002	Real Sociedad	233	(33)
2002–2003	Oviedo	33	(4)
2003–2004	Rayo Vallecano	29	(5)
2004–2006	Derby County	88	(20)
2006–2008	Southampton	35	(2)
2007	→ Queens Park Rangers (loan)	5	(1)
Total		487	(90)

International career
1995–1996	Spain U21	6	(0)
1996	Spain U23	3	(0)

Managerial career
- 2010–2011: Euskalduna
- 2011–2012: Berio
- 2012: Apollon Limassol (assistant)
- 2016: Derby County (assistant)
- 2017–2019: Luton Town U18
- 2019–2020: Luton Town (assistant)
- 2020–2021: Cultural Leonesa
- 2022–2023: Cancún
- 2023: Aston Villa U21
- 2024: Real Unión
- 2025: Lleida Esportiu
- 2025–2026: AEK Larnaca (assistant)
- 2026: Cádiz (assistant)
Medal record
Men's football
Representing Spain
UEFA European Under-21 Championship
Runner-up	1996 Spain
- * Club domestic league appearances and goals

Iñigo Idiakez Barkaiztegi (born 8 November 1973) is a Spanish former professional footballer who played as an attacking midfielder or a forward. He is currently a manager.

Beginning his career at Real Sociedad, he appeared in 254 official matches during his tenure over ten La Liga seasons (36 goals scored); in his homeland, he also represented Segunda División clubs Oviedo and Rayo Vallecano. He moved to England in 2004 at the age of 30, where he represented Championship teams Derby County, Southampton and Queens Park Rangers, retiring in 2008.

Idiakez played for Spain at under-21 and under-23 levels. He went into management in 2009, working in the lower leagues in Spain and also holding coaching positions at Leicester City, Derby County, Luton Town and Aston Villa.

== Club career ==
=== Spain ===
Idiakez was born in San Sebastián, Gipuzkoa. He joined local Real Sociedad's youth system in 1989, making his senior debut with the B team where he shared teams with his older brother Imanol. He first appeared with the main squad on 8 November 1992 – his 19th birthday – in a 3–0 home win against Cádiz; he did not become a regular until 1994–95 despite that early debut, spending nearly two full seasons with the reserves in the Segunda División B.

Subsequently, Idiakez played a further eight La Liga campaigns with the Txuriurdin, going on to appear in more than 250 competitive games. He was a regular substitute for most of his spell and, in 1998–99 and 2000–01, scored a career-best seven league goals. On 28 April 1995, he was on the scoresheet as the hosts beat Athletic Bilbao 5–0 in a Basque derby.

At the end of 2001–02, having finished his contract with Real Sociedad, Idiakez signed with Real Oviedo, who had just been relegated to Segunda División and were in a deep financial crisis. He only spent one year with the Asturias side who finished the season second-bottom, being relegated to the third tier then further demoted to Tercera División because of financial irregularities.

Idiakez then moved to Madrid's Rayo Vallecano, also from the second division. Again, his new club ranked 21st and was relegated at the end of the campaign.

=== England ===
In the summer of 2004, Derby County manager George Burley signed Idiakez up on a free transfer. He immediately adapted to the Championship, being named as the club's Player of the Season in his debut season as they finished in fourth place, but failed to win promotion through the play-offs. He was also included in the PFA Team of the Year, having renewed his contract in April 2005 and later in August after reported advances from Wolverhampton Wanderers.

At Derby, Idiakez played in an advanced position and took most free kicks and corners. In the 2005–06 campaign, under Phil Brown first and Terry Westley after, the team narrowly avoided relegation; he ended his stint at the Pride Park Stadium with 22 competitive goals in 96 matches.

Idiakez was once again signed by Burley on 31 August 2006, moving to Southampton for a fee of around £250,000. In March of the following year, having only made a handful of appearances, he joined Queens Park Rangers on loan for a month, scoring once against Leicester City in a 3–1 away win and subsequently returning to St Mary's Stadium.

In the 2006–07 play-offs, on 15 May 2007, Southampton faced Derby County. The tie finished 4–4 on aggregate at extra time then went to a penalty shootout, where Idiakez missed the crucial penalty to help send his former employers through to the final.

Southampton released Idiakez at the end of the 2007–08 season, then underwent trials with Major League Soccer side San Jose Earthquakes and Bournemouth,

== International career ==
Idiakez played for Spain at under-21 level, earning his first cap on 6 June 1995 in a 4–0 victory over Armenia held in Granada for the 1996 UEFA European Championship qualifiers. He also participated in the 1996 Summer Olympics in Atlanta, featuring three times for the quarter-finalists.

Additionally, Idiakez appeared in four friendlies for the Basque Country unofficial team, scoring twice.

== Coaching career ==
Idiakez returned to his hometown in 2009, beginning his managerial career with Añorga's youths. He was subsequently in charge of non-league sides SD Euskalduna and Berio also in the Basque Country.

In 2011, Idiakez completed his coaching qualifications when he earned the UEFA Pro Licence. A year later, he joined his former Derby and Southampton boss Burley as assistant at Apollon Limassol in the Cypriot First Division, with the pair leaving after only two games.

Idiakez returned to England in 2013, to take up the position of youth development coach at Premier League club Leicester City, working with the under-12 to under-16 age groups. He remained there for three years, before re-joining Derby County as first-team manager; he left the latter only two months later, following the suspension of manager Nigel Pearson.

In September 2017, Idiakez became professional development phase lead coach at League Two's Luton Town. He returned to head-coaching duties on 1 December 2020, with Spanish third-tier Cultural y Deportiva Leonesa.

Idiakez then had stints in the Mexican Liga de Expansión MX with Cancún and England with Aston Villa's under-21 team. On 28 December 2023, he went back to Spain by being named manager of Primera Federación side Real Unión, being dismissed the following April.

On 4 March 2025, was appointed at Lleida CF of Segunda Federación. In June, after administrative relegation and with the club on the verge of folding due to severe economic problems, he and the entire squad were released.

== Honours ==
Spain U21

- UEFA European Under-21 Championship runner-up: 1996

Individual

- PFA Team of the Year: 2004–05 Football League Championship
