= David Clowes =

English football club owner (born 1969)

- Born: April 1969 (age 57); United Kingdom
- Occupation: Businessman

David Clowes is an English businessman who is known for being the current owner of the Championship football club Derby County, and Clowes Developments, a British construction and real estate development company. Clowes is currently a director of 45 companies.

According to the Sunday Times Rich List, David Clowes and family rank 345th with a net worth of £350 million.

Clowes trained as a pilot for British Midland International in 2000, and continued flying for British Midland until 2012.

== Derby County ==
On 26 June 2022, after Clowes had purchased Pride Park Stadium, his bid to buy the club was accepted, and Quantuma granted Clowes preferred bidder status. The administrators said Clowes's offer complied with EFL insolvency policy, meaning Derby would avoid a further points deduction. The deal, and the club's exit from administration, was eventually confirmed on 1 July 2022, though some constraints on transfers were agreed by the EFL and Derby's new owners. The club's transfer embargo was finally lifted in May 2023.

In June 2023, Clowes said that had he not taken over the club, they might have entered liquidation a week later.

According to 2023 published accounts by Clowes Developments, David Clowes purchased Derby County for £13.2m and also paid Mel Morris £1 for Pride Park. Kieran Maguire, a football finance expert, described David Clowes as a "saint", following these accounts being published.

After three years of ownership, Clowes had taken the club from League One to 8th place in the Championship. The summer of 2026 saw speculation of a potential investment or takeover by Turki Al-Sheikh, with a deal reported to be close and waiting Independent Football Regulator approval in late July 2026. On 10 August 2026, Derby County released a statement that deal which been approved by the EFL and IFR, but Alalshikh's Lion Sport consortium had withdrawn from the deal and that Clowes Developments had taken the club "off the market".

== Clowes Developments ==
Clowes Developments are a nationwide real estate development company based in the UK. In 2022, they held over £300 million of property assets.

David Clowes joined Clowes Developments in 1985 and became a director in1991, and took over as Group Chairman after his father, Charles W Clowes, died in 2015. David's brother Thomas Clowes has been managing director of Clowes Developments since August 2023.
