= Jeremy Keith =

English football club charirman (born 1964)

Jeremy Philip Charles Keith (born 1964) became chief executive of Derby County after a corporation he controlled with two others bought the club out of receivership for £3 in 2003. He had previously been a director at Portsmouth and had a financial role at Leeds United.

== Early life ==
Keith was born in Montego Bay, Jamaica and moved to England when he was ten years old.

== Financial irregularities ==
Keith was charged on 12 November 2007 with conspiracy to defraud and conceal criminal property after police investigations at Derby County. In addition, former finance director Andrew Mackenzie and former director of football Murdo Mackay were charged with similar offences. In July 2009, Keith was convicted of false accounting and sentenced to 18 months in prison after being paid £125,000, as this payment was never approved by the club's board of directors. He was also disqualified from being a company director for three years. Following an appeal the sentences were reduced to nine months, with a two-year ban on being a director.
