= Derby County F.C. =

Association football club in Derby, England

Derby County
- Full name: Derby County Football Club
- Nickname: The Rams
- Short name: Derby
- Founded: 1884; 142 years ago
- Ground: Pride Park Stadium
- Capacity: 33,597
- Owner: David Clowes
- Chairman: David Clowes
- Head coach: John Eustace
- League: EFL Championship
- 2025–26: EFL Championship, 8th of 24
- Website: dcfc.co.uk
Home colours

Derby County Football Club (/ˈdɑːrbi/) is a professional association football club in Derby, England. The club competes in the EFL Championship, the second tier of English football.

One of the 12 founder members of the Football League in 1888, Derby County is one of only nine clubs to have competed in every season of the English football league system (127 seasons up to the end of the 2025–26 season), with all but six of those being in the top two divisions.

The club was founded in 1884 by William Morley as an offshoot of Derbyshire County Cricket Club. Its competitive peak came in the 1970s when it twice won the First Division and competed in major European competitions on four occasions, reaching the European Cup semi-finals as well as winning several minor trophies. Additionally, the club was a strong force in the interwar years – finishing league runner-up twice in the 1930s – and winning the first post-war FA Cup in 1946.

The club's home colours have been black and white since the 1890s. The team's nickname, The Rams, honours its links with the First Regiment of Derby Militia, its mascot being a ram, and its regimental song, a tribute to the county's traditions. They have a long-standing rivalry with Nottingham Forest, with whom they contest the East Midlands derby.

== History ==
=== Beginning and early success ===
Derby County F.C. was formed in 1884 as an offshoot of Derbyshire County Cricket Club in an attempt to give players and supporters a winter interest as well as secure the cricket club extra revenue. The original intention was to name the club "Derbyshire County F.C." to highlight the link, though the Derbyshire FA, formed in 1883, objected on the grounds it was too long and therefore would not have been understood by the fans who may mistake it for a Derbyshire FA team. Playing their home matches at the cricket club's Racecourse Ground, 1884–85 saw the club undertake an extensive programme of friendly matches, the first of which was a 6–0 defeat to Great Lever on 13 September 1884. The club's first competitive match came in the 1884–85 FA Cup, where they lost 7–0 at home to Walsall Town.

Arguably the most important match in the club's history came in the following season's FA Cup, when a 2–0 victory over Aston Villa, already an emerging force in English football, established Derby County on the English football map, helping the club to attract better opposition for friendlies and, in 1888, an invitation into the inaugural Football League. The opening day of the first ever league season was 8 September 1888, when Derby came from 3–0 down away to Bolton Wanderers to win 6–3, though the club ultimately finished 10th out of 12 teams. In 1891, they absorbed another Derby club, Derby Midland, which had been a member of the Midland League, leaving them as Derby's sole professional football club. Steve Bloomer, generally considered to be Derby County's best-ever player, joined the club in 1892. In 1895, the club moved to a new stadium, the Baseball Ground (so called because it was previously used for baseball), which became their home for the next 102 years. It was then that the club adopted their now traditional home colours of black and white.

Although Derby were inconsistent in the league, they finished as runners-up to Aston Villa in 1896, and achieved a number of third-place finishes. They were a strong force in the FA Cup, appearing in three finals in six years around the turn of the 20th century, though lost all three, in 1898 (3–1 to Notts Forest), 1899 (4–1 to Sheffield United) and 1903 (6–0 to Bury).

Notable figures include W. D. Clarke who was reportedly "among the best-known figures in the world of Association football in pre-war days."

=== Edwardian and interwar era ===
In 1906, Steve Bloomer was sold to Middlesbrough due to financial constraints, and Derby subsequently suffered its first ever relegation the following season, but under Jimmy Methven's management, they re-signed Bloomer and regained their First Division place in 1911. In 1914, they were again relegated, but instantly won the Second Division to earn promotion, though World War I meant they had to wait until 1919 to play First Division football again. After two seasons, they were relegated yet again in 1921. However, the appointment of George Jobey in 1925 kick-started a successful period for the Rams and, after promotion in 1926, the club became a formidable force, with high finishes from the late 1920s and all through the 1930s, including finishing as runners-up twice.

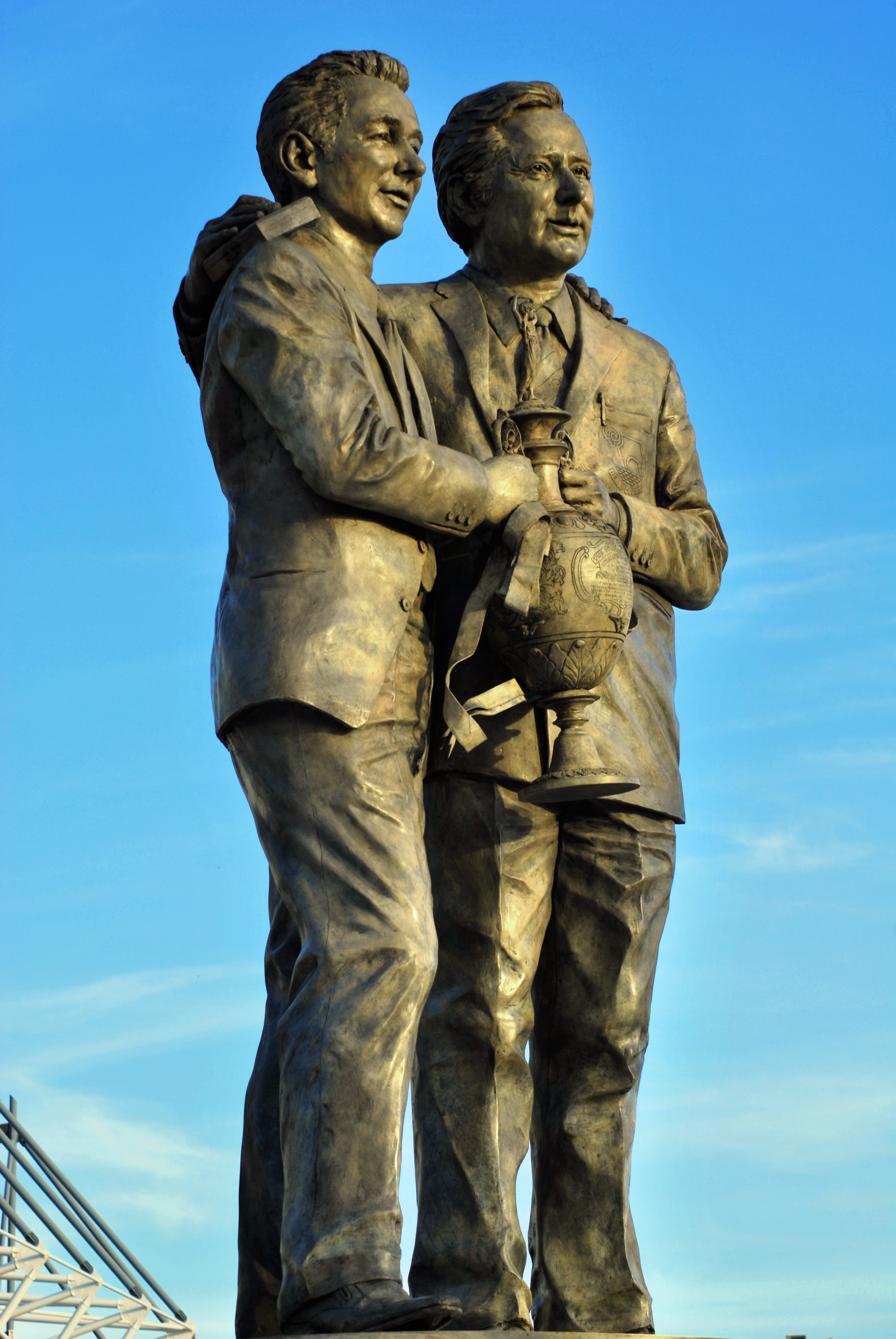
The Brian Clough and Peter Taylor statue

Derby were one of several clubs to close down after the outbreak of World War II but restarted in the early 1940s, in part due to the persistence of Jack Nicholas and Jack Webb. Aided by the recruitment of Raich Carter and Peter Doherty, who had both been stationed in Loughborough during the war, Derby were one step ahead of the opposition when competitive football resumed with the 1946 FA Cup and won their first major trophy with a 4–1 victory over Charlton Athletic.

=== Post-war success and decline ===
The league restarted the following season after a break due to World War II and, under the management of Stuart McMillan, as well as twice breaking the British transfer record to sign Billy Steel and Johnny Morris to replace Carter and Doherty, finished fourth and third in the 1948 and 1949 seasons respectively, before a steady decline set in and the club was relegated in 1953, after nearly 30 years in the top flight, and again in 1955 to drop to the third tier of English football for the first time in their history. Harry Storer led Derby back into the second tier at the second attempt in 1957, though the club progressed no further over the next decade under either Storer or his successor, former Derby player Tim Ward.

=== Brian Clough era ===
In 1967, Brian Clough and Peter Taylor took over and led Derby to its greatest glory. Starting at 18th in the Second Division in 1968, Clough and Taylor acquired Alan Hinton, Roy McFarland, and John O'Hare, then clinched the influential signing of Dave Mackay to lead the club to first place in 1969, and promotion to the First Division. Derby went on to finish fourth in 1970, were banned from competing in Europe due to financial irregularities in 1971, and won their first ever Football League Championship in 1972. Though Derby did not retain their title the following season, they did reach the semi-finals of the European Cup, where they lost to Juventus. Clough's frequent outspoken comments against football's establishment eventually led to him falling out with the board of directors at the club, and Clough and Taylor left in October 1973. Such was their impact on the club that, 37 years later, a 9 ft (2.75 metres) bronze statue of the pair was erected outside Pride Park in commemoration of their legacy.

=== Success and decline after Clough ===
Despite the departure of Clough and Taylor, Derby's league success was repeated in the 1974–75 season when they won the title under successor Dave Mackay, who had been a player under Clough when they had returned to the top flight in 1969. However, Derby's form declined towards the end of the 1970s and they were relegated to the Second Division in 1980 after a string of managers, including former Manchester United boss Tommy Docherty, unsettled the club. Though they challenged well in their first season in Division Two, Derby were soon badly affected by rising debts, falling attendances and dismal performances.

Peter Taylor returned to the Baseball Ground as manager in early 1983 and kept Derby up that season, but he retired a year later just before Derby's relegation to the Third Division for only the second time in their history. However, Derby did manage to avoid going out of business, and they were soon under the ownership of wealthy businessman Robert Maxwell.

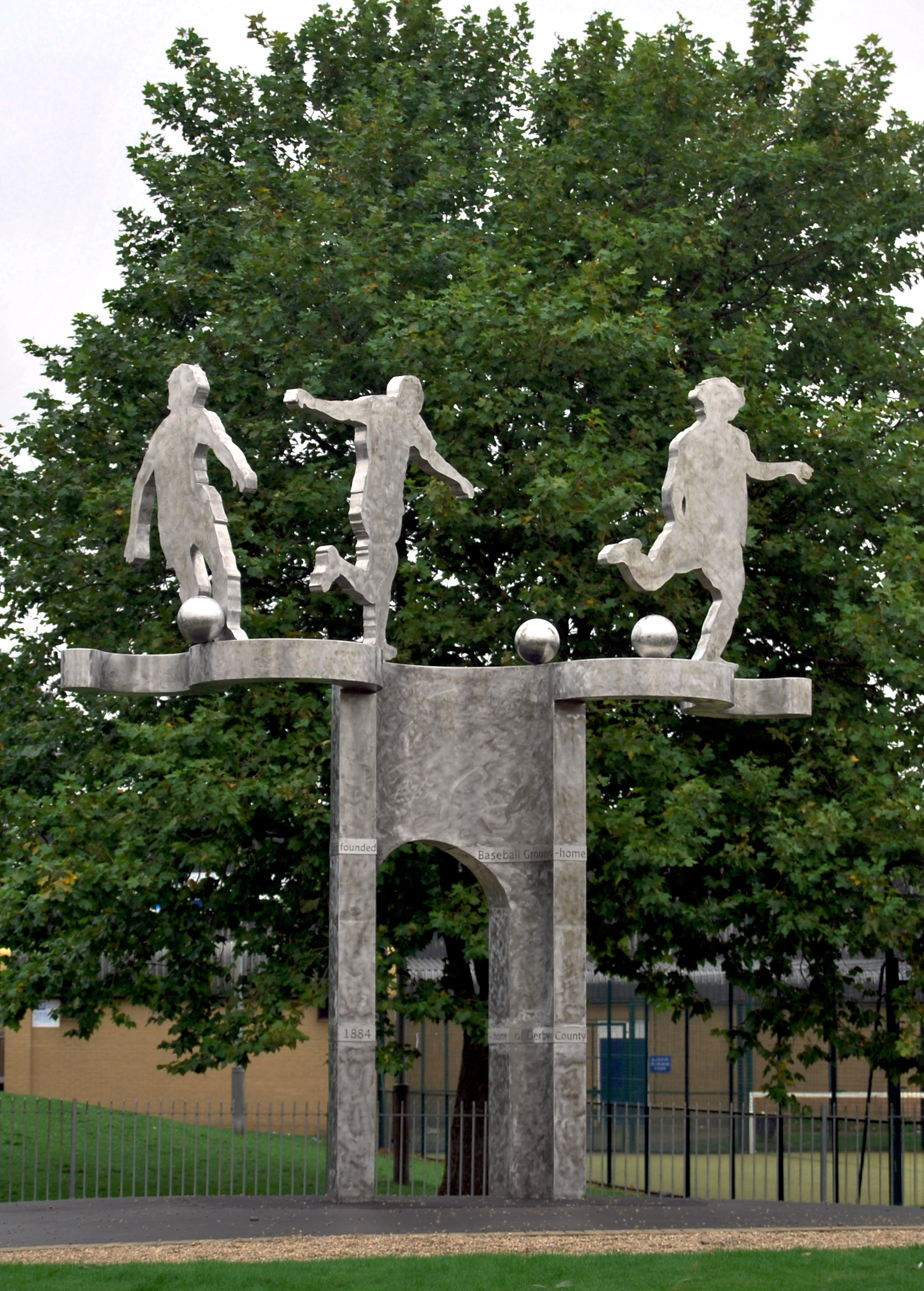
Derby County's former Baseball Ground commemoration by Denis O'Connor

=== 1980s revival and promotion to Premier League ===
After relegation to the Third Division in May 1984, the club appointed Arthur Cox as manager. Although they missed out on promotion in Cox's first season as manager, they then won back-to-back promotions and were back in the First Division for the 1987–88 season, with attendances also rising as the club's on-the-field fortunes and financial position improved. The financial backing of new chairman Robert Maxwell saw stars such as Peter Shilton, Mark Wright, Dean Saunders, Trevor Hebberd and Ted McMinn brought to the club and they finished fifth in the 1988–89 season.

A lack of any further investment from Maxwell quickly led to a decline and discontent amongst the club's fans, culminating in relegation back to the Second Division in 1991 when the club finished bottom of the First Division with just five wins all season. At this time, local newspaper businessman Lionel Pickering became the majority shareholder of the club, taking control just before Maxwell's death in November 1991. In 1992, Derby County paid £2.5 million for Notts County central defender Craig Short, at the time – and for five years afterwards – the most expensive player to be signed by a club outside the top flight, and indeed one of the highest fees paid by any English club for a player at the time. Other expensive signings included strikers Tommy Johnson and Marco Gabbiadini. Cox's resignation as manager in October 1993 saw the appointment of former player Roy McFarland as manager. Derby reached the final of the Division One playoffs that season, but were beaten by local rivals Leicester City. McFarland was sacked a year later after Derby missed out on the playoffs, and his replacement was Jim Smith – a manager whose track record at his previous clubs included four promotions and an FA Cup semi-final appearance.

Although the 1995–96 season started slowly, the signing of sweeper Igor Štimac in the early autumn proved pivotal. Smith guided the Rams to a second-place finish and the Premier League, now the top flight of English football. During that season, it was announced Derby would be leaving the Baseball Ground after more than 100 years to move into a new all-seater stadium, following earlier plans to develop the Baseball Ground as a 26,000-seat stadium.

After finishing in 12th place in their first season back in the top flight, the club left the Baseball Ground, its home of 102 years, to move into the new 33,597-seat Pride Park Stadium for the 1997–98 season. The Baseball Ground was demolished six years later and a memorial was eventually erected in memory of its role in Derby city history.

=== Relegation from top flight and financial crisis ===
The club settled well into its new home as it recorded back-to-back top 10 finishes for the first time since their 1970s peak, before a sudden decline at the turn of the millennium saw three years of struggle. Smith resigned to be replaced by former players Colin Todd, who lasted just three months, and John Gregory, before the Rams were relegated after a six-year stay in the top flight, in 2002.

Derby County's relegation saw the club enter a serious financial crisis, which forced them to sell many key players. Gregory was later suspended from his managerial duties over alleged misconduct and former Ipswich Town boss George Burley was brought in. The club was put into receivership then sold in October 2003 for £3 to a group led by Jeremy Keith. After finishing 20th in the 2003–04 season, a dramatic improvement in the 2004–05 season saw Derby finish fourth in the Championship, qualifying for a promotion play-off spot, though they lost in the semi-finals to Preston North End. Soon afterwards, Burley resigned citing differences between himself and the board. He was replaced by Bolton Wanderers first team coach Phil Brown. In January 2006, Brown was sacked after a poor run of results. Terry Westley, the academy coach at the time, took over first-team duties until the end of the season and saved Derby from relegation.

=== Return to the Premier League and straight back to the Championship ===
In April 2006, a consortium of local businessmen led by former vice-chairman Peter Gadsby purchased the club, reducing its debt and returning Pride Park Stadium to the club's ownership in the process. In June 2006, former Preston North End boss Billy Davies was appointed Derby County's new permanent manager. In his first season, Davies took Derby to the Championship play-offs, where they beat Southampton on penalties in the semi-finals before defeating West Bromwich Albion 1–0 with a second-half Stephen Pearson goal at the new Wembley Stadium to secure a return to the Premier League and the associated £60 million windfall.

After failing to win any of their opening five matches of the season (one draw and four consecutive defeats), Derby scored their first victory with a 1–0 win over Newcastle, where Kenny Miller scored the only goal of the game. In October 2007, Peter Gadsby stepped down as chairman to be replaced by former Hull City owner Adam Pearson, who immediately began searching for investment from overseas. After a poor start to the season, manager Billy Davies left by mutual consent in November. He was succeeded by Paul Jewell, who failed to save the club as Derby suffered the Premier League's earliest ever relegation, in March, recorded the Premier League's lowest-ever points total, and equalled Loughborough's 108-year Football League record of going through an entire season with only one win, which occurred during the 1899–1900 season when Loughborough finished bottom of the Second Division. In January 2008, Derby was taken over by an international investment group led by General Sports and Entertainment, with Pearson remaining as de facto chairman.

Derby's match at home to Sheffield United on 13 September 2008 generated much media coverage as it was approaching a year since Derby's last league win, a run which saw the club break the English league record for most matches without a win. Just four days short of the anniversary of the 1–0 victory over Newcastle United, Rob Hulse scored against his former club as Derby ran out 2–1 winners, earning Paul Jewell his first league win as Derby boss at his 27th attempt. Despite taking the club to the League Cup semi-final, the club's first major cup semi-final since 1976, where Derby lost 4–3 to Manchester United over two legs, Jewell resigned as manager in December 2008 after a run of just two wins in 11 matches. He was replaced by Nigel Clough, son of former manager Brian Clough. Nigel Clough led the club to 18th place and safety. After four years of midtable obscurity, Clough was replaced by Steve McClaren in September 2013; McClaren led the club to a 3rd-place finish in the 2013–14 season, but lost the play-off final to Queens Park Rangers.

=== Play-off defeats, administration and relegation ===
The following season local businessman Mel Morris assumed ownership of the club. Morris initially oversaw a level of spending unprecedented in Derby's history, breaking the club's transfer record four times in his first three years, but also oversaw an equally unprecedented managerial turnover, with nine managers in six years from June 2015. In that period, the club endured three unsuccessful play-off campaigns, failing in the semi-finals twice and losing in the 2019 final to Aston Villa. In May 2021, the club, managed by Wayne Rooney, narrowly avoided relegation to League One. In May 2021, the possibility of EFL sanctions arose amidst allegations of breaches of financial fair play regulations. On 8 July 2021, the EFL imposed a transfer embargo on the club, leaving Rooney with a squad of just nine contracted senior professionals.

On 17 September 2021, the club's board of directors announced that the club was to go into administration, and the EFL confirmed Derby faced a 12-point deduction. On 16 November, the club had a further deduction of nine points for breaching EFL accounting rules. A further three-point deduction, for breaches of EFL profitability and sustainability rules, was suspended. Derby and related companies were reported to owe £29.3m to HM Revenue and Customs. Other liabilities included a £20m loan from US investment group MSD Holdings, plus various football and trade creditors owed around £15m. Following a defeat at QPR, Derby County were relegated to League One.

On 26 June 2022, after Derbyshire-based property developer David Clowes had purchased Pride Park, his bid to buy the club was accepted, and Quantuma granted Clowes preferred bidder status. The administrators said Clowes's offer complied with EFL insolvency policy, meaning Derby would avoid a further points deduction. The deal, and the club's exit from administration, was eventually confirmed on 1 July 2022, though some constraints on transfers were agreed by the EFL and Derby's new owners. (Clowes paid £33m to purchase the club, which included £19.7m paid to creditors, and agreed a £22m deal to buy Pride Park and settle an outstanding loan to MSD.) In September 2022, Derby had appointed Rotherham United manager Paul Warne. The side vied for promotion, but missed out on the League One play-offs, finishing 7th. The club's transfer embargo was finally lifted in May 2023.

=== Back to the Championship ===
At the end of the 2023–24 season, Derby were promoted back to the Championship as runners-up with their highest ever points tally. In September 2024, club owner David Clowes was reported to have held talks with unnamed potential investors about selling a majority stake in Derby County. Sources confirmed "several interested parties" had considered investment.

On 7 February 2025, after a poor streak of results culminating in seven straight league defeats, Derby announced they had relieved manager Paul Warne of his duties and would begin the search for a new manager immediately. On 13 February, Derby announced that former player John Eustace had been appointed as the new Head Coach. The move saw him leave his position at Blackburn Rovers, despite the Rams being significantly lower in the league table at the time.

The 2025–26 season was a marked improvement from Derby County in Eustace's first full season in charge of the club as they finished 8th in the league and missed out on a place in the Championship playoffs on the final day of the season, falling five points short.

The summer of 2026 saw speculation of a potential investment or takeover by Turki Al-Sheikh, with a deal reported to be close and waiting Independent Football Regulator approval in July 2026. On 10 August 2026, Derby County released a statement that deal which been approved by the EFL and IFR, but Alsheikh's Lion Sport had withdrawn from the deal and that Clowes Developments had taken the club "off the market".

== Club identity ==
=== Crest ===
Derby County's badge from 1946

Like most old football clubs, Derby County did not initially have any badge displayed on their shirts. Their first badge was introduced in 1924. The badge consisted of a circular shield split into three equally sized sections, representing the club, its fans and the area, all containing items traditionally associated with the city of Derby: a Tudor rose and a crown in one section, a buck in a park in the second and a ram's head in the final section. The badge was worn on the players' shirts for just two seasons before they reverted to plain shirts.

By 1934, another badge had been introduced. This time it was a traditionally shaped shield, again with three sections. The buck in the park had been removed and the rose and the crown had been split up and now occupied a section each. The ram's head also remained and was now given the largest section of the shield. The badge never appeared on the players' shirts. The shield was modified in 1946 when the rose and crown were removed and replaced with the letters "DC" (Derby County) and "FC" (Football Club) respectively. The badge, right, was featured on the player's shirts from its introduction onwards, though the ram's head on its own was used from the late 1960s (the full shield, however, remained the club's official logo).

Derby County's badge from 1997 to 2007

A new club badge was introduced in 1971, featuring a more modern design that, with modifications, is still in use. The badge initially consisted of a stylised white ram facing left. The badge was first modified slightly in 1979 to include the text "Derby County FC" under the ram (though the ram remained on its own on away kits). In 1982, the ram turned to face to the right and the text under it was removed. The ram was surrounded by a wreath of laurel and the text "Centenary 1984–1985" was printed underneath for the club's centenary season. The laurel was removed and the text reading "Derby County FC" returned from the next season. In 1993, the ram faced left again and the text was removed once more. From 1995, the ram faced right and was enclosed in a diamond, with a gold banner reading "Derby County FC" underneath and the text "1884" (the year of the club's foundation) underneath that. The design was changed again in 1997 (see left): the ram now faced left and the golden banner now simply read "Derby County"; the diamond and year of formation were removed.

Derby County's badge from 2009 to 2013, a version of this badge with gold trim was used from 2007 to 2009.

A decade later, in 2007, the badge was modified again with the ram still facing left and the text "Est. 1884" now in the middle of a circular frame featuring "Derby County Football Club" in gold lettering, with the colours being modified to the club colours of black and white in 2009 (see top of page). In July 2012, the club announced its intention to show only the iconic ram, now just an outline, on future shirts, rather than the full club logo. In July 2013, this traditional ram became the club's full logo again.

=== Colours ===
Derby County's original colours (right) were amber, chocolate and blue, though by the 1890s the club had adopted its now traditional colours of black and white, which are still in use today. In the 1970s and 1980s, colours for home matches were white shirts with small blue or red touches (on the club badge or shirt makers insignia), blue shorts and socks that were blue, red, white or a combination of the three. The colours of away kits have varied widely, and although they are usually yellow/gold or blue, the colour for the away kit for the 2008–09 season was fluorescent green. The club also introduced a surprise third kit in August 2008. Similar in design to the club's away kit of the 1970s, with blue and white stripes and reminiscent of the Argentina national team strip, the style was re-introduced following feedback from fans who said it was one of their favourite kits from the club's past.

1884–94 kit

Period	Kit Sponsor	Shirt Sponsor
1973–1979	Umbro	None
1979–1980	Le Coq Sportif	None
1980–1981	Le Coq Sportif	British Midland
1981–1982	Le Coq Sportif	Patrick
1982–1984	Patrick	Patrick
1984–1985	Admiral	Bass Brewery
1985–1986	OSCA	Bass Brewery
1986–1987	OSCA	Sportsweek
1987–1992	Umbro	Maxwell Communications
1992–1993	Umbro	Auto Windscreens
1993–1994	Bukta	Auto Windscreens
1994–1995	Rams Pro Wear	Auto Windscreens
1995–1998	Puma	Puma
1998–2001	Puma	EDS
2001–2005	Erreà	Marston's Pedigree
2005–2007	Joma	Derbyshire Building Society
2007–2008	Adidas	Derbyshire Building Society
2008–2010	Adidas	Bombardier
2010–2012	Adidas	buymobiles.net
2012–2014	Kappa	buymobiles.net
2014–2017	Umbro	Just Eat
2017–2018	Umbro	Avon Tyres
2018–2022	Umbro	32Red
2022–2023	Umbro	NSPCC
2023–2024	Umbro	Host and Stay
2024–2026	Puma	FanHub
2026–	Puma	Loaded

=== Club mascot ===
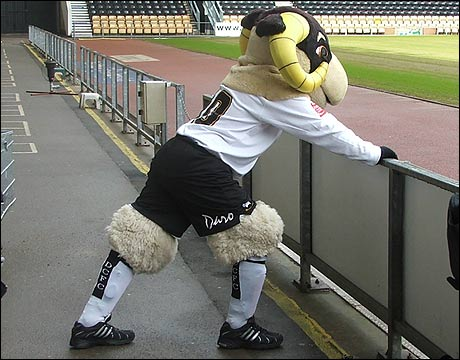
Derby County's mascot, Rammie

Derby's mascot is a ram named Rammie, who also works to maintain the club's links with fans and the East Midlands in general, such as school visits to promote literacy and charity events. Rammie originally emerged as a more friendly option to the club's traditional links with the British Army and the Mercian Regiment in particular.

Rammie was the first full-time mascot in British football. Rammie's traditional activities include penalty shoot-outs with members of the crowd at half-time, with Rammie as goalkeeper, and warming the crowd up before the match and encouraging the Derby fans during matches. Rammie is a very popular figure amongst Rams fans and, in 2005, released his first DVD, which features the character reading from Aesop's Fables in the Derbyshire countryside.

Shortly thereafter, Rammie was joined by a female equivalent and his sister, named Ewie. However, Ewie did not last very long at Pride Park, and took a reported "vacation" to the United States. She returned from a 10-year exile on 3 October 2015 at a home match against Brentford.

== Grounds ==
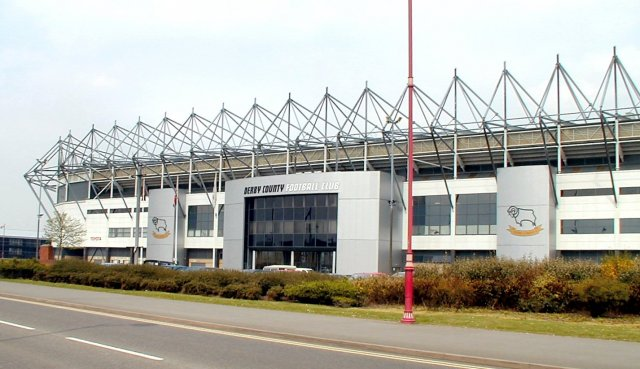
Pride Park Stadium has been Derby's home since 1997

As an offshoot of the cricket club, Derby County's first home stadium was the County Cricket Ground, also known as the Racecourse Ground, where the club played between 1884 and 1895. Although the ground itself was good enough to hold the first FA Cup final match outside London, when Blackburn Rovers beat West Bromwich Albion 2–0 in the 1886 FA Cup final replay, and a full England international, disputes over fixture clashes between the football and cricket clubs meant that when the opportunity to play at Sir Francis Ley's Baseball Ground arose, the club accepted.

Commonly referred to amongst supporters as "the BBG", the club moved to the Baseball Ground in 1895 and remained there for the next 102 years, despite opportunities to move in the 1920s and 1940s. Derby had already played there, a 1–0 win over Sunderland during the 1891–92 season, as an alternative venue after a fixture clash at the County Ground. At its peak during the late 1960s, the ground could hold around 42,000 – the club's record attendance achieved following the opening of the Ley Stand with a 41,826 crowd watching a 5–0 defeat of Tottenham Hotspur on 20 September 1969. From this peak, the continued addition of seating saw the capacity drop over the next 15 years to 26,500 in 1985.

Following the Taylor Report in 1989, and the legal requirement for all-seater stadia, the ground's capacity dwindled to just 18,500 by the mid-1990s, not enough for the then ambitious second-tier club. Despite initially hoping to rebuild the Baseball Ground to hold 26,000 spectators, and rejecting the offer of two sites elsewhere in Derby, then-chairman Lionel Pickering announced in February 1996 the intention to move to a new, purpose-built stadium at the newly regenerated Pride Park, with the last first-team game at the Baseball Ground being in May 1997, a 1–3 home defeat to Arsenal, though it continued to host reserve matches until 2003. Derby's new ground, named Pride Park Stadium, was officially opened by Queen Elizabeth II on 18 July with a friendly against Italian club Sampdoria following on 4 August.

Derby hold the unique distinction of being the only club to have had three home grounds host full England internationals. England beat Ireland 9–0 at the Racecourse Ground in 1895, beat Ireland again, 2–1, at the Baseball Ground in 1911 and, most recently, Pride Park hosted England's 4–0 win over Mexico in May 2001.

Pride Park was renamed the iPro Stadium on 7 December 2013, as part of a 10-year, £7 million sponsorship deal with global sports drink company iPro. At the beginning of 2017, it reverted to its original name of Pride Park Stadium.

Clowes Developments (UK) Ltd purchased Pride Park from Mel Morris on 17 June 2022. On 14 May 2025, it was announced by Derby County that the holding companies for the stadium and football club would be merged, so the football club owned Pride Park Stadium again.

== Supporters and rivalry ==
=== Support ===
Derby is often acknowledged as a "passionate football town" by rival supporters and the press alike. Tony Francis of The Daily Telegraph noted, "Derby is a passionate football town... Even in Division Two, it's a reasonable bet that crowds at Pride Park would not fall far below 30,000. It's historical, it's geographical, it's in the blood. Some places have it, some don't." During the 2007–08 Premier League season, Derby County fans were repeatedly referred to as the best in the country (England) due to their loyalty despite the club's disastrous campaign. Almost every home match at Pride Park Stadium was sold out to the Derby fans and the club also had a large following away from home. The recognition included them being named fans of the season in much national coverage of the season, winning an award from Nuts magazine, and being named the most loyal supporters in the country in a 2008 survey by Sky Sports Magazine. In 2013, Derby supporter Nick Webster was voted Championship Fan of the Year.

Statistically, the club had the 12th-highest average attendance in the country in the 2007–08, 2008–09, and 2009–10 seasons, despite only having the 15th-largest club ground and finishing 18th or lower in their respective division. In 2008–09, they were the best supported club in the Championship, with a larger average attendance than nine Premier League clubs. Since moving to the Pride Park Stadium in 1997, Derby's average attendance has never dropped below 23,000 and they have finished in the top 20 for highest average attendances in 20 out of 25 seasons, despite spending the majority of the time in the second tier. In the 2023–24 Derby were the 6th best supported team in the entire EFL, with an average gate of 27,278 despite playing in the third tier; they also boasted a higher average attendance than six Premier League clubs.

Derby's celebrity supporters include actors George Clooney and Robert Lindsay, former Labour MP Dennis Skinner, Irish singer Niall Horan, Blur guitarist Graham Coxon, The Gaslight Anthem guitarist Alex Rosamilia, adult film star Keiran Lee, boxers Sandy Ryan and Zach Parker, and actor Jack O'Connell. It has been reported that O'Connell has persuaded other celebrities to support the club, including actress Angelina Jolie.

=== Rivalries ===
Derby's primary rival clubs are Nottingham Forest, Leicester City and Leeds United.

Forest, based in Nottingham, 14 miles (23 km) east of Derby, are by far the fiercest rivals; a 2008 survey named the rivalry the 11th-largest in English football, revealing that nine out of 10 fans from both clubs point to the other as their fiercest rival, whilst a 2020 survey listed it joint-12th. Meetings between the side are known as East Midlands derbies and the winning team is awarded the Brian Clough Trophy. The rivalry as a whole largely developed from the 1970s, due to former Derby manager Brian Clough taking over at Forest, much to the anger of the Derby fans. The rivalry has been seen to be as much about which club owns Clough's heart as the proximity of the clubs geographically.

The rivalry with Leicester stems from location, as well as Leicester winning in the 1994 play-off final.

Leeds United are disliked due to ongoing friction from the early 1970s when Derby and Leeds were two of the top English teams and the scarcely concealed hostility between their respective managers, Brian Clough and Don Revie and is documented in the novel and film The Damned United. This rivalry is traditionally stronger on Derby's side: while Derby consider Leeds their second or third-biggest rivals, Leeds fans focus more on their dislike of Manchester United and Chelsea, however the rivalry intensified once more in the 2018–19 season following the 'Spygate' scandal, play-off semi-final and increased animosity between the managers, staff and fans of both clubs.

A 2019 study called 'The League of Love And Hate' reported Derby fan's top five rivals as Nottingham Forest (88%), Leicester City (64%), Leeds United (63%), Stoke City (43%) and Aston Villa (30%). Derby themselves appeared in the top fives of Forest (1st – 77%), Leicester (2nd – 60%), Burton Albion (3rd – 56%), Leeds (5th – 30%) and Stoke (5th – 28%).

== League history ==
Chart of table positions of Derby County in the Football League

Derby were one of the twelve founder members of the Football League and are one of only ten clubs to have competed in every single season of English league football. The club has primarily competed in the top two divisions of the football pyramid, though it has had three separate two-year spells in the third tier (1955–57, 1984–86, and 2022–24).

The club's longest spell in the top flight was 27 years, achieved between 1926 and 1953. However, the club only competed in 21 consecutive seasons of Division One at this time as competitive football was suspended during 1940 and 1946 due to the outbreak of World War II.

The club is currently on its longest spell outside of the top tier; it will compete in the second tier in the 2024–25 season, a 17th consecutive season without top flight football following relegation from the Premier League in 2008. This breaks the previous record of 16 consecutive seasons between 1953 and 1969.

1888–1907 Division 1 (L1) (Note: At the beginning of the 1892–93 season, the Football League expanded to include a second division; the existing division (which Derby was playing in) was renamed the First Division.); 1907–1912 Division 2 (L2); 1912–1914 Division 1 (L1); 1914–1915 Division 2 (L2); 1919–1921 Division 1 (L1); 1921–1926 Division 2 (L2)	1926–1953 Division 1 (L1); 1953–1955 Division 2 (L2); 1955–1957 Division 3 (North) (L3); 1957–1969 Division 2 (L2); 1969–1980 Division 1 (L1); 1980–1984 Division 2 (L2)	1984-1986 Division 3 (L3); 1986–1987 Division 2 (L2); 1987–1991 Division 1 (L1); 1991–1996 Division 1 (L2) (Note: At the beginning of the 1992–93 season, the clubs in the Football League First Division broke away to form the FA Premier League; as a result, the Football League's three remaining divisions were renamed: the Second Division (which Derby were playing in) became the First Division, the Third Division became the Second Division and the Fourth Division became the Third Division.); 1996–2002 Premier League (L1); 2002–2007 Championship (L2) (Note: At the beginning of the 2004–05 season, the Football League renamed its divisions: the First Division (which Derby were playing in) became The Championship, the Second Division became League One and the Third Division became League Two.)	2007–2008 Premier League (L1); 2008–2022 Championship (L2); 2022–2024 League One (L3); 2024– Championship (L2)

L1 = Level 1 of the football league system; L2 = Level 2 of the football league system; L3 = Level 3 of the football league system.
- Seasons spent at Level 1 of the football league system: 65
- Seasons spent at Level 2 of the football league system: 55
- Seasons spent at Level 3 of the football league system: 6

(up to and including 2024–25)

== Players ==
=== Current squad ===
As of 29 October 2026

Note: Flags indicate national team as defined under FIFA eligibility rules; some limited exceptions apply. Players may hold more than one non-FIFA nationality.

No.	Pos.	Nation	Player
1	GK	SWE	Jacob Widell Zetterström
2	DF	ENG	Derry Murkin
3	DF	SCO	Craig Forsyth
4	MF	ENG	David Ozoh
5	DF	ENG	Matt Clarke
6	DF	NOR	Sondre Langås
7	FW	USA	Patrick Agyemang
8	MF	ENG	Bobby Clark
9	FW	ENG	Carlton Morris
10	FW	ENG	Rhian Brewster
11	MF	IRL	Sammie Szmodics (on loan from Ipswich Town)
12	GK	ENG	Richard O'Donnell
13	MF	GER	Filip Bilbija
14	DF	ENG	Jack Robinson
15	FW	NOR	Lars-Jørgen Salvesen
16	FW	GHA	Mohammed Fuseini (on loan from Union Saint-Gilloise)
18	DF	ENG	Charlie Taylor

No.	Pos.	Nation	Player
19	FW	DEN	Henrik Meister (on loan from Pisa)
20	MF	ENG	Alex Mowatt
22	DF	SCO	Max Johnston
23	MF	ENG	Joe Ward
24	DF	NAM	Ryan Nyambe
25	DF	IRL	Shane Duffy
26	MF	WAL	Ryan Hedges
27	MF	ENG	Lewis Travis (captain)
28	DF	ENG	Dion Sanderson
29	MF	DEN	Oscar Fraulo
31	GK	ENG	Josh Vickers
33	FW	ENG	Corey Blackett-Taylor
39	GK	AUS	Nicholas Bilokapic
41	MF	ENG	Charlie Smith
43	DF	ENG	Isaac Gordon
44	DF	IRL	Eiran Cashin (on loan from Brighton & Hove Albion)

==== Out on loan ====
Note: Flags indicate national team as defined under FIFA eligibility rules; some limited exceptions apply. Players may hold more than one non-FIFA nationality.

No.	Pos.	Nation	Player
17	MF	NED	Kenzo Goudmijn (at Grasshopper until 30 June 2027)
37	MF	ENG	Owen Eames (at Falkirk until 31 May 2027)

No.	Pos.	Nation	Player
39	FW	JAM	Dajaune Brown (at Rochdale until 31 May 2027)
40	MF	WAL	Cruz Allen (at FC Halifax Town until 26 September 2026)

==== Under-21s and Academy ====
The following Under-21 players have previously been named in a Derby County squad for a competitive match:

Note: Flags indicate national team as defined under FIFA eligibility rules; some limited exceptions apply. Players may hold more than one non-FIFA nationality.

No.	Pos.	Nation	Player
42	DF	IRL	Raymond Offor
45	DF	ENG	Rio Canoville

No.	Pos.	Nation	Player
—	GK	ENG	Harley Price

=== Notable former players ===
==== Premier League Hall of Fame ====
The Premier League Hall of Fame honours the leading association football players and managers that have played and managed in the Premier League, the top level of the English football league system. Inaugurated in 2020 but delayed a year due to the COVID-19 pandemic, the Hall of Fame is intended to recognise and honour players and managers that have achieved great success and made a significant contribution to the league since its founding in 1992. Three ex players/managers associated with Derby County are represented in the PL Hall of fame.

- 2021 – (England) Frank Lampard
- 2022 – (England) Wayne Rooney
- 2024 – (England) Ashley Cole

==== English Football Hall of Fame members ====
Several ex-players/managers associated with Derby County are represented in the English Football Hall of Fame, which was created in 2002 as a celebration of those who have achieved at the very peak of the English game. To be considered for induction players/managers must be 30 years of age or older and have played/managed for at least five years in England.

- 2002 – (England) Brian Clough (Northern Ireland) Peter Doherty (England) Peter Shilton (Scotland) Dave Mackay
- 2008 – (England) Steve Bloomer
- 2010 – (England) Francis Lee
- 2013 – (England) Raich Carter
- 2014 – (Scotland) Hughie Gallacher
- 2015 - (Republic of Ireland) Paul McGrath
- 2016 – (Scotland) John Robertson
- 2017 – (England) Frank Lampard
- 2025 – (England) Ashley Cole

==== Football League 100 Legends ====
The Football League 100 Legends is a list of "100 legendary football players" produced by The Football League in 1998, to celebrate the 100th season of League football. Eight former Derby players made the list.

- (England) John Goodall
- (England) Steve Bloomer
- (Scotland) Hughie Gallacher
- (England) Raich Carter
- (Northern Ireland) Peter Doherty
- (Scotland) Dave Mackay
- (England) Peter Shilton
- (Republic of Ireland) Paul McGrath

==== Player of the decade (1970s–2010s) ====
To mark the 50th anniversary of Derby's First Division Championship, the BBC polled fans to identify the Rams' best players for the five decades since 1972. For the 1970s, Kevin Hector received most votes; for the 1980s, Bobby Davison; for the 1990s, Dean Saunders; for the 2000s, Mart Poom, and for the 2010s, Craig Bryson.

== Club management ==
=== Coaching positions ===
As of 26 May 2026

- Head coach: John Eustace
- Assistant head coach: Matt Gardiner
- First team coach: Keith Downing
- Part-time coach: Steve Round
- Head of Goalkeeping: Paul Clements
- Academy manager: Jamie Smith
- Head of recruitment: Leigh Bromby

=== Board of directors and ownership ===
As of 30 June 2023

- Owner and Chairman: David Clowes
- Club Secretary and Board Member: Richard Tavernor
- Board Member: Ian Dickinson
- CEO: Stephen Pearce
- Club Ambassadors: Roy McFarland; Roger Davies

=== Managerial history ===
Below is a list of all the permanent managers that Derby County have had since the appointment of Harry Newbould in 1900. In the 12 years prior to Newbould's appointment, the team was selected by club committee, a standard practice by football clubs at the time.

- 2025–: (England) John Eustace
- 2022–2025: (England) Paul Warne
- 2020–2022: (England) Wayne Rooney
- 2019–2020: (Netherlands) Phillip Cocu
- 2018–2019: (England) Frank Lampard
- 2017–2018: (England) Gary Rowett
- 2016–2017: (England) Steve McClaren
- 2016: (England) Nigel Pearson
- 2016: (England) Darren Wassall
- 2015–2016: (England) Paul Clement
- 2013–2015: (England) Steve McClaren
- 2009–2013: (England) Nigel Clough
- 2007–2008: (England) Paul Jewell
- 2006–2007: (Scotland) Billy Davies
- 2006: (England) Terry Westley
- 2005–2006: (England) Phil Brown
- 2003–2005: (Scotland) George Burley
- 2002–2003: (England) John Gregory
- 2001–2002: (England) Colin Todd
- 1995–2001: (England) Jim Smith
- 1993–1995: (England) Roy McFarland
- 1984–1993: (England) Arthur Cox
- 1984: (England) Roy McFarland
- 1982–1984: (England) Peter Taylor
- 1982: (England) John Newman
- 1979–1982: (England) Colin Addison
- 1977–1979: (Scotland) Tommy Docherty
- 1976–1977: (England) Colin Murphy
- 1973–1976: (Scotland) Dave Mackay
- 1967–1973: (England) Brian Clough
- 1962–1967: (England) Tim Ward
- 1955–1962: (England) Harry Storer
- 1953–1955: (England) Jack Barker
- 1946–1953: (England) Stuart McMillan
- 1944–1946: (England) Ted Magner
- 1942–1944: (England) Jack Nicholas
- 1925–1941: (England) George Jobey
- 1922–1925: (England) Cecil Potter
- 1906–1922: (Scotland) Jimmy Methven
- 1896–1906: (England) Harry Newbould

== Club academy ==
=== Moor Farm ===
Derby County's academy, called Moor Farm, is a purpose-built complex situated near the city suburb of Oakwood. It was built in 2003, at a cost of £5 million, to replace the club's previous academy, The Ram-Arena, which was based at Raynesway. It covers 50 acres (200,000 m^{2}) and features six full-sized training pitches plus an indoor pitch and includes a gym, restaurant, ProZone room and a laundry. When opening the academy, then-Chairman Lionel Pickering said that the intent was to have "at least eight players from the Academy... in the first-team within three years." Although this was not achieved, the academy produced a number of notable players, including England international midfielder Tom Huddlestone, Wales international defender Lewin Nyatanga, Northern Ireland international goalkeeper Lee Camp, England under-21s players Miles Addison and Lee Grant, as well as England under-19 player Giles Barnes.

In April 2009, new manager Nigel Clough announced his intention to restructure the academy, appointing former Derby players Darren Wassall and Michael Forsyth and Wolverhampton Wanderers Academy director John Perkins to the backroom staff, replacing the departed Phil Cannon, David Lowe and Brian Burrows. Following this, and an increased investment of £1 million per year from the club, a number of players broke through to the first team squad ahead of the 2010–11 season, almost a third of the Derby squad were academy graduates, with Mason Bennett setting the club record for youngest first team appearance when he made his full debut with a start in a defeat at Middlesbrough on 22 October 2011 at the age of 15 years and 99 days old. This helped strengthen the academy's reputation and reinforced CEO Tom Glick's stated desire to make Moor Farm "the academy of choice in the Midlands." In August 2012, Derby's academy became a tier 2 academy under the new controversial Elite Player Performance Plan. It was awarded Tier 1 status two years later in July 2014. Focus on the academy continued during the ownership of Mel Morris after his purchase of the club later that year and, at the end of the 2019–20 season Derby had given more first-team minutes to players aged under 21 than any other club in the Football League Championship, with academy graduates such as Max Bird, Louie Sibley, Jason Knight, Jayden Bogle, Morgan Whittaker and Lee Buchanan getting a total of 7,946 minutes in the league during the campaign. When discussing targets for the 2020–21 campaign, Morris stated "We are not going to see a team of 11 players from the Academy featuring this season (2019/20) but the target for next season (is) 50% of our starting 11 should be Academy players. That (is) our target, and I think there is a possibility we could get there."

== Derby County in Europe ==
Derby first competed in Europe when they entered the 1972–73 European Cup after winning the 1971–72 First Division Title, reaching the semi-final stages, where they lost 3–1 on aggregate to Juventus. They had qualified for the 1970–71 Fairs Cup after finishing the 1969–70 First Division in 4th, but were banned from entering the competition for financial irregularities. The 70s was Derby County's peak in English football, and they qualified for Europe in three of the next four seasons, competing in the UEFA Cup or the European Cup in each of the three seasons between 1974–75 and 1976–77.

The club then declined rapidly and has not appeared in the top European competitions since, though it finished in 5th in the 1989 First Division which would have guaranteed entry into the 1989–90 UEFA Cup had English Clubs not been banned from Europe following the Heysel Stadium Disaster.

Outside of major competition, the club competed in the Anglo-Italian Cup between 1992–93 and 1994–95, reaching the final in 1993, losing 3–1 to Cremonese at Wembley.

== Records and statistics ==
Kevin Hector holds the record for Derby County appearances in all competitions, appearing 589 times in two spells with the club between 1966 and 1982. He sits ahead of Ron Webster, who played 535 times for the club. Just counting league appearances, Hector is again in the lead with 486 appearances, ahead of Jack Parry, who played 483 times for the club between 1948 and 1967. The club's all-time top goalscorer is Steve Bloomer, who netted 332 goals for the club in two spells between 1892 and 1914. He is over 100 goals ahead of second in the list Kevin Hector, who netted 201 goals for the club. Jack Bowers holds the club record for most goals in a single season, when he scored 43 goals (35 in the league and a further 8 in the FA Cup), during the 1932–33 season. The record league scorer for a season is Jack Bowers and Ray Straw with 37 goals in the 1930–31 and 1956–57 seasons respectively.

The club's record attendance is 41,826, for a First Division match against Tottenham Hotspur at the Baseball Ground on 20 September 1969, which Derby won 5–0. The record is unlikely to be broken in the near future as Derby's current stadium, Pride Park Stadium, has a limit of 33,597 spectators. The record attendance at Pride Park for a competitive Derby County match is 33,378 for a Premier League match against Liverpool on 18 March 2000. The largest crowd to ever watch a Derby County game is 120,000 when Derby County played Real Madrid at the Santiago Bernabéu Stadium in the 1975–76 European Cup.

Derby's historically poor 2007–08 Premier League campaign saw the club set a then record for the lowest points total in a league campaign (3-points for a win), as it collected just 11-points from its 38-game campaign (P38 W1 D8 L29), and equalled Loughborough's 1899-1900 record of 1 win in a season. As of the end of the 2024-25 season they jointly hold several Premier League records.

- Fewest home wins in a season (1, held with Sunderland, 2005-2006, Ipswich Town, 2024-25 and Southampton, 2024-25.)
- Fewest away wins in a season (0, held with five other clubs)
- Least goals in a season (20, jointly held with Sheffield United, 2023-24.)
- Worst Goal Difference (-69, jointly held with Sheffield United, 2023-24.)

Derby also jointly own (alongside Watford) the record for most lopsided defeat in an FA Cup final, a 6–0 loss to Bury in 1903.

=== All-time XI ===

Derby County F.C. All Time First XI

As part of the club's 125th Anniversary celebrations, it was announced that during 2009 each month a vote would be carried out to decide on the club's official All Time XI, starting in February 2009 with the goalkeeper, with the following eight months offering opportunities for Derby's support to select a team based within a 4–4–2 formation, with December's vote being reserved for the manager. Voting closed on the 25th of each month, with the winner being announced in the following few days.

Player	Position	Years at Club	Ref
Colin Boulton	Goalkeeper	1964–1978	
Ron Webster	Right back	1960–1978	
Roy McFarland	Centre back	1967–1981; 1983–84	
Igor Štimac	Centre back	1995–1999	
David Nish	Left back	1972–1979	
Stefano Eranio	Right Wing	1997–2001	
Archie Gemmill	Centre Midfielder	1970–1977; 1982–1984	
Alan Durban	Centre Midfielder	1963–1973	
Alan Hinton	Left Wing	1967–1975	
Steve Bloomer	Centre forward	1892–1906; 1910–1914	
Kevin Hector	Centre forward	1966–1978; 1980–1982	
Brian Clough	Manager	1967–1973	

== Honours ==
Note: the leagues and divisions of English football have changed somewhat over time, so here they are grouped into their relative levels on the English football league system at the time they were won to allow easy comparison of the achievement

League

- First Division (level 1)
  - Champions: 1971–72, 1974–75
  - Runners-up: 1895–96, 1929–30, 1935–36
- Second Division / First Division / Championship (level 2)
  - Champions: 1911–12, 1914–15, 1968–69, 1986–87
  - Runners-up: 1925–26, 1995–96
  - Play-off winners: 2007
- Third Division North / Third Division / League One (level 3)
  - Champions: 1956–57
  - Runners-up: 1955–56, 2023–24
  - Promoted: 1985–86

Cup

- FA Cup
  - Winners: 1945–46
  - Runners-up: 1897–98, 1898–99, 1902–03
- FA Charity Shield
  - Winners: 1975
- Texaco Cup
  - Winners: 1971–72
- Anglo-Italian Cup
  - Runners-up: 1992–93
- Watney Cup
  - Winners: 1970
