= 1972–73 Derby County F.C. season =

Derby County
1972–73 season
- Manager: Brian Clough
- Stadium: Baseball Ground
- First Division: 7th
- FA Cup: Sixth round
- League Cup: Third round
- European Cup: Semi-finals
- Top goalscorer: League: Kevin Hector (14); All: Kevin Hector (18)
Home colours	Away colours

During the 1972–73 English football season, Derby County F.C. competed in the Football League First Division. As the reigning champions of the First Division, Derby would represent England in the European Cup.

== Season summary ==
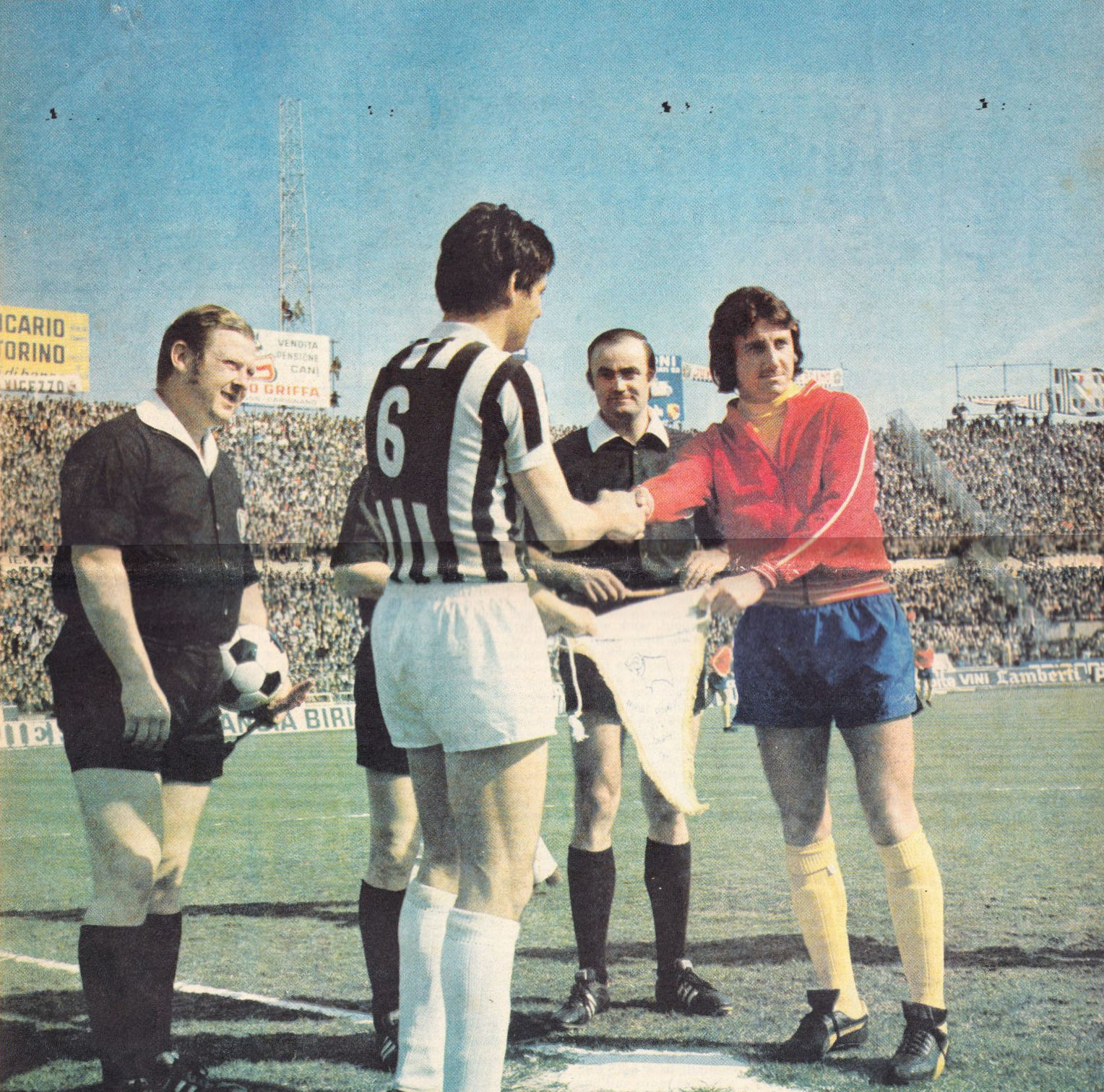
The 1st round of the European Cup semi-finals in Turin against Juventus

The club broke the British transfer record with the signing of half-back David Nish, from Midland rivals Leicester City, for £225,000. Derby County were unable to retain their title and finished in 7th place, one point off qualification for the UEFA Cup. This slump was in part due to the club's poor away form, winning only four matches away from home all season – one of the matches lost was a 5–0 defeat at Leeds United, the loss only serving to intensify the rivalry between Clough and United manager Don Revie. The club had better success in the European Cup, reaching the semi-finals before being knocked out by Juventus: Clough accused the Bianconeri of bribing the match officials — describing the Italians as "cheating bastards" at the end of the first leg match in Turin —, despite they will prove later unrelated to any attempt to combine.

At the end of the season, Kevin Hector was voted Derby's Player of the Year.

== Squad ==
Note: Flags indicate national team as defined under FIFA eligibility rules; some limited exceptions apply. Players may hold more than one non-FIFA nationality.

Pos.	Nation	Player
GK	ENG	Colin Boulton
DF	ENG	Peter Daniel
DF	ENG	Roy McFarland (c)
DF	ENG	David Nish
DF	ENG	Colin Todd
DF	ENG	Ron Webster
DF	WAL	Terry Hennessey
MF	ENG	Willie Carlin

Pos.	Nation	Player
MF	ENG	Alan Hinton
MF	ENG	Steve Powell
MF	SCO	Archie Gemmill
MF	SCO	John McGovern
FW	ENG	Roger Davies
FW	ENG	Kevin Hector
FW	SCO	John O'Hare

=== Transfers ===
In
Pos.	Name	from	Type
DF	David Nish	Leicester City	£225,000
FW	John Sims		

Out
Pos.	Name	To	Type
DF	John Robson	Aston Villa	£90,000
FW	Barry Butlin	Luton Town	

== Results ==
=== First Division ===
==== League table ====
Pos	Team	Pld	W	D	L	GF	GA	GAv	Pts	Qualification or relegation
5	Wolverhampton Wanderers	42	18	11	13	66	54	1.222	47	Qualification for the UEFA Cup first round (Note: Tottenham Hotspur qualified for the UEFA Cup as the Football League Cup winners.)
6	West Ham United	42	17	12	13	67	53	1.264	46	Qualification for the Watney Cup (Note: West Ham United and Stoke City qualified for the Watney Cup as the two teams with the most goals that had not already qualified for a European competition.)
7	Derby County	42	19	8	15	56	54	1.037	46	
8	Tottenham Hotspur	42	16	13	13	58	48	1.208	45	Qualification for the UEFA Cup first round
9	Newcastle United	42	16	13	13	60	51	1.176	45	

Source: World Football
Rules for classification: 1) Points; 2) Goal average; 3) Goals scored

==== Results by round ====
Round	1	2	3	4	5	6	7	8	9	10	11	12	13	14	15	16	17	18	19	20	21	22	23	24	25	26	27	28	29	30	31	32	33	34	35	36	37	38	39	40	41	42
Ground	A	A	H	H	A	A	H	A	H	A	H	A	H	A	H	A	H	A	H	A	H	H	A	H	A	H	A	H	A	H	H	A	H	A	A	A	A	A	H	H	H	H
Result	D	D	L	W	L	L	W	L	W	L	W	L	W	L	W	L	D	W	W	W	W	D	L	W	D	W	D	W	L	L	W	L	L	D	L	W	W	L	D	W	W	W
Position	14	13	16	12	15	18	13	13	13	16	14	16	13	16	14	16	16	15	13	10	7	6	10	7	6	6	6	5	6	5	5	6	6	7	9	8	9	10	9	9	8	7

Source: Competitive matches
A = Away; H = Home; W = Win; D = Draw; L = Loss; = Leader, Qualification to 1973–74 European Cup; = Qualification to 1973–74 UEFA Cup; = Relegation to 1973–74 Second Division

==== Matches ====
12 August 1972 1	Southampton F.C.	1–1	Derby County	Southampton
	Channon 55'		26' Hinton	Stadium: The Dell; Attendance: 20,525

15 August 1972 2	Crystal Palace F.C.	0–0	Derby County	Croydon (London)
				Stadium: Selhurst Park

19 August 1972 3	Derby County	1–2	Chelsea F.C.	Derby
15:00	Hector 49'		38' Harris; 75' Garland; (yellow card) Hudson; (yellow card) Osgood	Stadium: Baseball Ground; Attendance: 31,868; Referee: Anthony E. Morrissey

23 August 1972 4	Derby County	1–0	Manchester City	Derby
	Walker 57'			Stadium: Baseball Ground; Attendance: 31,173

26 August 1972 5	Norwich City	1–0	Derby County	Norwich
	Gemmill 53' (o.g.)			Stadium: Carrow Road; Attendance: 30,075

29 August 1972 6	Everton F.C.	1–0	Derby County	Walton
	Joe Royle			Stadium: Goodison Park; Attendance: 39,780

2 September 1972 7	Derby County	2–1	Liverpool F.C.	Derby
	Hinton 53'; O’Hare 87'		17' Toshack	Stadium: Baseball Ground; Attendance: 32,524

9 September 1972 8	West Bromwich Albion	2–1	Derby County	West Bromwich
	Gould 21'; A Brown 68'		15' McFarland	Stadium: The Hawthorns; Attendance: 17,279

16 September 1972 9	Derby County	1–0	Birmingham City	Derby
	Hector 80'			Stadium: Baseball Ground; Attendance: 23,753

23 September 1972 10	Manchester United	3–1	Derby County	Greater Manchester
	Storey-Moore 33'; Davies 65'; Morgan 75'			Stadium: Old Trafford; Attendance: 48,255

30 September 1972 11	Derby County	2–1	Tottenham Hotspur	Derby
	Hector 46'; Hinton 89' (pen.)		49' Perryman	Stadium: Baseball Ground; Attendance: 32,133

7 October 1972 12	Leeds United	5–0	Derby County	Leeds
	Giles 3', 27'; Clarke 37'; Bremner 61'; Lorimer 88'			Stadium: Elland Road; Attendance: 36,477

14 October 1972 13	Derby County	2–1	Leicester City	Derby
	Hennessey 44'; Hinton 65' (pen.)		77' Weller	Stadium: Baseball Ground; Attendance: 31,841

21 October 1972 14	Ipswich Town	3–1	Derby County	Ipswich
	Belfitt 27'; Beattie 39'; Whymark 87'		59' (pen.) Hinton	Stadium: Portman Road; Attendance: 16,944

28 October 1972 15	Derby County	2–1	Sheffield United	Derby
	Todd 35'; O’Hare 64'		61' Currie	Stadium: Baseball Ground; Attendance: 30,929

4 November 1972 16	Manchester City	4–0	Derby County	Moss Side
	Carrodus 3'; Marsh 35'; Bell 59'; Todd 61' (o.g.)			Stadium: Maine Road; Attendance: 35,566

11 November 1972 17	Derby County	2–2	Crystal Palace F.C.	Derby
	Powell 34'; Hinton 35'		26' Rogers; 39' (pen.) Craven	Stadium: Baseball Ground; Attendance: 27,716

18 November 1972 18	West Ham United	1–2	Derby County	Upton Park (London)
	Robson 56'		2', 15' Hector	Stadium: Boleyn Ground; Attendance: 28,154

25 November 1972 19	Derby County	5–0	Arsenal	Derby
	McGovern 22'; Hinton 36'; McFarland 40'; Hector 43'; Davies 47'			Stadium: Baseball Ground; Attendance: 31,034

2 December 1972 20	Wolverhampton Wanderers	1–2	Derby County	Wolverhampton
	Richards 53'		22' Hennessey; 69' Hector	Stadium: Molineaux; Attendance: 24,891

9 December 1972 21	Derby County	2–0	Coventry City	Derby
	Hinton 55' (pen.); Gemmill 70'			Stadium: Baseball Ground; Attendance: 31,002

16 December 1972 22	Derby County	1–1	Newcastle United	Derby
	Hector 59'		36' Tudor	Stadium: Baseball Ground; Attendance: 28,826

23 December 1972 23	Stoke City	4–0	Derby County	Stoke-on-Trent
	Ritchie 10', 60'; Hurst 30'; Greenhoff 37'			Stadium: Victoria Ground; Attendance: 25,084

26 December 1972 24	Derby County	3–1	Manchester United	Derby
	McFarland 7', 58'; Hinton 19'		61' Storey-Moore	Stadium: Baseball Ground; Attendance: 35,098

30 December 1972 25	Chelsea F.C.	1–1	Derby County	Fulham
	Osgood 71'		7' O’Hare	Stadium: Stamford Bridge; Attendance: 29,794

6 January 1973 26	Derby County	1–0	Norwich City	Derby
	Hinton 36' (pen.)			Stadium: Baseball Ground; Attendance: 27,580

20 January 1973 27	Liverpool F.C.	1–1	Derby County	Liverpool
	Toshack 23'		15' Davies	Stadium: Anfield Road; Attendance: 45,996

27 January 1973 28	Derby County	2–0	West Bromwich Albion	Derby
	Hinton 35' (pen.); Davies 55'			Stadium: Baseball Ground; Attendance: 28,833

10 February 1973 29	Birmingham City	2–0	Derby County	Birmingham
	Latchford 29'; Francis 48'			Attendance: 38,096

14 February 1973 30	Derby County	0–3	Stoke City	Derby
			Jimmy Greenhoff; Jimmy Robertson; John Mahoney	Stadium: Baseball Ground; Attendance: 22,106

17 February 1973 31	Derby County	4–0	Southampton F.C.	Derby
	Hinton 25'; Hector 65', 81'; McCarthy 74' (o.g.)			Stadium: Baseball Ground; Attendance: 26,426

28 February 1973 32	Newcastle United	2–0	Derby County	Newcastle-upon-Tyne
	John Tudor; Malcolm Macdonald			Stadium: St James' Park; Attendance: 34,286

3 March 1973 33	Derby County	2–3	Leeds United	Derby
	Durban 25'; Hector 56'		42' (pen.), 68' (pen.) Lorimer; 71' Clarke	Stadium: Baseball Ground; Attendance: 38,100

10 March 1973 34	Leicester City	0–0	Derby County	Leicester
				Stadium: Filbert Street; Attendance: 29,690

24 March 1973 35	Sheffield United	3–1	Derby County	Sheffield
	Dearden 20', 73'; Bone 62'		88' Davies	Stadium: Bramall Lane; Attendance: 24,401

31 March 1973 36	Arsenal F.C.	0–1	Derby County	Islington (London)
			2' Powell	Stadium: Highbury; Attendance: 45,217

14 April 1973 37	Coventry City	0–2	Derby County	Coventry
			O’Hare 13'; Hector 79'	Stadium: Highfield Road; Attendance: 22,759

18 April 1973 38	Tottenham Hotspur	1–0	Derby County	Tottenham
	(o.g.)Roy McFarland	9		Stadium: White Hart Lane; Attendance: 22,659

21 April 1973 39	Derby County	1–1	West Ham United	Derby
	Gemmill 87' (pen.)		75' Lutton	Stadium: Baseball Ground; Attendance: 28,727

28 April 1973 40	Derby County	3–1	Everton F.C.	Derby
	Nish 3'; Hinton 59'; Gemmill 70' (pen.)		76' Connolly	Stadium: Baseball Ground; Attendance: 24,194

30 April 1973 41	Derby County	3–0	Ipswich Town	Derby
	Davies 36'; Hector 46'; Hector 67'			Stadium: Baseball Ground; Attendance: 20,374

4 May 1973 42	Derby County	3–0	Wolverhampton Wanderers	Derby
	Davies; Davies; McFarland			Stadium: Baseball Ground; Attendance: 31,590

=== League Cup ===
==== Second Round ====
5 September 1972	Swindon Town	0–1	Derby County	Swindon
			Hennessey	Stadium: County Ground; Attendance: 15,730

==== Third Round ====
4 October 1972	Derby County	0–0	Chelsea F.C.	Derby
				Stadium: Baseball Ground; Attendance: 28,065

9 October 1972 Replay	Chelsea F.C.	3–2	Derby County	Fulham
19:45	Kember 4'; Webb 14'; Osgood 52'		13' Hinton; 65' McGovern	Stadium: Stamford Bridge; Attendance: 26,395; Referee: John H Yates

=== FA Cup ===
==== Third round ====
13 January 1973	Peterborough United	0–1	Derby County	Peterborough
			36' Davies	Stadium: London Road; Attendance: 20,855; Referee: D Richardson

==== Fourth Round ====
3 February 1973	Derby County	1–1	Tottenham Hotspur	Derby
	Davies 85'		79' Martin Chivers	Stadium: Baseball Ground; Attendance: 37,895

7 February 1973 Replay	Tottenham Hotspur	3–5 (a.e.t.)	Derby County	Tottenham
	Martin Chivers 19'; Alan Gilzean 43'; Mike England 77' (pen.)		70' Hector; 79' Davies; 85' Davies; 107' Davies; 112' Hector	Stadium: White Hart Lane; Attendance: 52,736; Referee: KH Burns

==== Fifth Round ====
24 February 1973	Derby County	4–2	Queen's Park Rangers	Derby
	Roger Davies 9'; Kevin Hector 22', 33', 36'		53' Mick Leach; 66' Don Givens	Stadium: Baseball Ground; Attendance: 38,100

==== Sixth Round ====
17 March 1973	Leeds United	1–0	Derby County	Leeds
	Lorimer 29'			Stadium: Elland Road; Attendance: 38,350; Referee: HG New

=== European Cup ===
13 September 1972	Derby County (England)	2–0	(Socialist Federal Republic of Yugoslavia) Željezničar
	McFarland 38 Gemmill 53

27 September 1972	Željezničar (Socialist Federal Republic of Yugoslavia)	1–2	(England) Derby County
	Sprečo 60		Hinton 9 O'Hare 15

==== Eightfinals ====
25 October 1972	Derby County (England)	3–0	(Portugal) Benfica
	McFarland 6'; Hector 8'; McGovern 40'

8 November 1972	Benfica (Portugal)	0–0	(England) Derby County

==== Quarterfinals ====
7 March 1973	Spartak Trnava (Czechoslovakia)	1–0	(England) Derby County
	Horváth 42'

21 March 1973	Derby County (England)	2–0	(Czechoslovakia) Spartak Trnava
	Hector 40'; Hector 51'

==== Semi-finals ====
11 April 1973 1	Juventus (Italy)	3–1	(England) Derby County	Turin, Italy
	Altafini 28', 83'; Causio 65'		30' Hector; (yellow card) McFarland; (yellow card) Gemmill	Stadium: Stadio Comunale; Referee: (West Germany) Schulenburg

25 April 1973 2	Derby County (England)	0–0 (1–3 agg.)	(Italy) Juventus	Derby, England
	Hinton (penalty missed) 57'; Davies (red card) 63'			Stadium: Baseball Ground; Referee: (Portugal) Marques Lobo

== Statistics ==
=== Squad statistics ===
No.	Pos	Nat	Player	Total		Football League Division One		Football League Cup		FA Cup		European Cup	
No.	Pos	Nat	Player	Apps	Goals	Apps	Goals	Apps	Goals	Apps	Goals	Apps	Goals
	GK	(England) ENG	Colin Boulton	56	0	40	0	3	0	5	0	8	0
	DF	(England) ENG	Ron Webster	34	0	26	0	0	0	4	0	4	0
	DF	(England) ENG	Roy McFarland	53	7	38	5	3	0	5	0	7	2
	DF	(England) ENG	Colin Todd	57	1	41	1	3	0	5	0	8	0
	DF	(England) ENG	David Nish	46	1	34	1	3	0	5	0	4	0
	MF	(Scotland) SCO	John McGovern	55	3	39	1	3	1	5	0	8	1
	MF	(Scotland) SCO	Archie Gemmill	49	9	34	3	3	0	5	5	7	1
	MF	(England) ENG	Alan Hinton	37	15	27	13	3	1	1	0	6	1
	FW	(England) ENG	Roger Davies	32	9	19+1	0	0	0	5	6	7	3
	FW	(England) ENG	Kevin Hector	52	18	41	14	3	0	0	0	8	4
	FW	(Scotland) SCO	John O'Hare	50	5	34	4	3	0	5	0	8	1
	GK	(England) ENG	Graham Moseley	2	0	2	0	0	0	0	0	0	0
	MF	(England) ENG	Steve Powell	30	2	22	2	3	0	1	0	4	0
	DF	(Wales) WAL	Terry Hennessey	28	4	21	2	1	1	2	1	4	0
	MF	(Wales) WAL	Alan Durban	27	1	11+7	1	1+1	0	1+3	0	2+1	0
	DF	(England) ENG	John Robson	14	0	10	0	1	0	0	0	3	0
	DF	(England) ENG	Peter Daniel	14	0	9	0	0	0	1	0	4	0
	DF	(England) ENG	Jim Walker	5	1	5	1						
	DF	(England) ENG	Tony Parry	6	0	4+2	0						
	FW	(England) ENG	John Sims	4	0	2+1	0	0	0	0	0	0+1	0
	DF	(England) ENG	Alan Lewis	2	0	2	0						
	FW	(England) ENG	Barry Butlin	1	0	1	0						
	MF	(England) ENG	Willie Carlin										

- Source: https://www.11v11.com/teams/derby-county/tab/players/season/1973/comp/56/
