= 1973–74 Derby County F.C. season =

Football season in the United Kingdom

Derby County
1973–74 season
- Chairman: Sam Longson
- Manager: Brian Clough (until 15 October 1973); Jimmy Gordon (until 20 October 1973); Dave Mackay
- Stadium: Baseball Ground
- First Division: 3rd
- FA Cup: Fourth round
- League Cup: Second round
- Top goalscorer: League: Kevin Hector (19); All: Hector (19)
Home colours	Away colours

During the 1973–74 English football season, Derby County F.C. competed in the Division One, the FA Cup and the League Cup.

== Season summary ==
During summer the club transferred in defender Rod Thomas and midfielder Henry Newton. In his seventh season as manager, Brian Clough took the Rams to the 3rd spot through Autumn, however, he left the club after a turmoil against Chairman Sam Longson. Therefore, the Club Executive Board appointed former player (1968–71) Dave Mackay as its new manager. The Scottish ex-defender changed Derby's style of play from a solid defence with Clough to a more offensive deployment including the arrival of Midfielder Bruce Rioch replacing McGovern and O'Hare as starters since February.

After being ninth during winter, the squad recovered form and finished the league season in third place qualifying for the next UEFA Cup. Meanwhile, the club was eliminated early by Sunderland in the League Cup second round phase. Also, in the FA Cup Fourth round stage the team lost against Coventry City after one replay.

== Squad ==
Note: Flags indicate national team as defined under FIFA eligibility rules; some limited exceptions apply. Players may hold more than one non-FIFA nationality.

Pos.	Nation	Player
GK	ENG	Colin Boulton
GK	ENG	Graham Moseley
DF	ENG	Ron Webster
DF	ENG	Roy McFarland (c)
DF	ENG	Colin Todd
DF	ENG	David Nish
DF	WAL	Rod Thomas
DF	ENG	Jim Walker
DF	ENG	Peter Daniel

Pos.	Nation	Player
MF	ENG	Henry Newton
MF	SCO	John McGovern
MF	ENG	Steve Powell
MF	SCO	Archie Gemmill
MF	ENG	Alan Hinton
MF	ENG	Jeff Bourne
MF	SCO	Bruce Rioch
FW	ENG	Roger Davies
FW	ENG	Kevin Hector
FW	SCO	John O'Hare

=== Transfers ===
In
Pos.	Name	from	Type
DF	Rod Thomas	Swindon Town	£100,000
MF	Henry Newton	Everton F.C.	

Out
Pos.	Name	To	Type
DF	Terry Hennessey	Tamworth F.C.	
MF	Alan Durban	Shrewsbury Town F.C.	
DF	Tony Parry	Mansfield Town	loan
FW	John Sims		
FW	Barry Butlin	Luton Town F.C.	

==== Winter ====
In
Pos.	Name	from	Type
MF	Bruce Rioch	Aston Villa	

Out
Pos.	Name	To	Type
DF	Alan Lewis	Peterborough United F.C.	loan

== Results ==
=== Division One ===
==== League table ====
Pos	Team	Pld	W	D	L	GF	GA	GAv	Pts	Qualification or relegation
1	Leeds United (C)	42	24	14	4	66	31	2.129	62	Qualification for the European Cup first round
2	Liverpool	42	22	13	7	52	31	1.677	57	Qualification for the Cup Winners' Cup first round (Note: Liverpool qualified for the Cup Winners' Cup first round as the 1973-74 FA Cup winners.)
3	Derby County	42	17	14	11	52	42	1.238	48	Qualification for the UEFA Cup first round
4	Ipswich Town	42	18	11	13	67	58	1.155	47	Qualification for the UEFA Cup first round
5	Stoke City	42	15	16	11	54	42	1.286	46	Qualification for the UEFA Cup first round

Source: World Football
Rules for classification: 1) Points; 2) Goal average; 3) Goals scored
(C) Champions

==== Results by round ====
Round	1	2	3	4	5	6	7	8	9	10	11	12	13	14	15	16	17	18	19	20	21	22	23	24	25	26	27	28	29	30	31	32	33	34	35	36	37	38	39	40	41	42
Ground	H	H	A	A	H	H	A	A	H	A	H	A	H	A	H	A	A	H	H	A	H	A	A	H	H	A	H	A	H	A	H	A	H	A	H	A	A	A	H	H	A	H
Result	W	W	D	L	W	W	D	L	W	L	D	W	W	D	L	L	L	D	D	W	W	D	L	D	W	D	W	L	D	W	D	D	D	W	W	D	L	L	W	W	L	W
Position	4	4	2	9	7	3	5	5	2	4	4	3	3	3	5	8	9	8	9	7	4	5	6	9	4	5	3	4	4	3	3	3	3	3	3	3	3	4	4	4	4	3

Source: https://www.11v11.com/teams/derby-county/tab/matches/season/1974/
A = Away; H = Home; W = Win; D = Draw; L = Loss; = Leader, Qualification to 1974–75 European Cup; = Qualification to 1974–75 UEFA Cup; = Relegation to 1974–75 Second Division

==== Matches ====
- .- Source:https://www.11v11.com/teams/derby-county/tab/matches/season/1974/

25 August 1973 1	Derby County	1–0	Chelsea F.C.	Derby
15:00	John McGovern 20'			Stadium: Baseball Ground; Attendance: 30,869; Referee: Robert Matthewson

29 August 1973 2	Derby County	1–0	Manchester City	Derby
15:00	Hinton			Stadium: Baseball Ground; Attendance: 31,295

1 September 1973 3	Birmingham City	0–0	Derby County	Birmingham
				Stadium: St Andrew's; Attendance: 34,596

4 September 1973 4	Liverpool F.C.	2–0	Derby County	Liverpool
	Thompson 35'; Keegan 85' (pen.)			Stadium: Anfield; Attendance: 45,237

8 September 1973 5	Derby County	2–1	Everton F.C.	Derby
	Hector 60'; Davies 66'		36' Husband	Stadium: Baseball Ground; Attendance: 27,638

12 September 1973 6	Derby County	3–1	Liverpool F.C.	Derby
	Hector; McFarland; Davies		Boersma	Stadium: Baseball Ground; Attendance: 32,867

15 September 1973 7	Burnley F.C.	1–1	Derby County	Burnley
	Hankin 70'		37' Davies	Stadium: Turf Moor; Attendance: 23,334

18 September 1973 8	Coventry City	1–0	Derby County	Coventry
	Colin Stein 9'			Stadium: Highfield Road; Attendance: 26,511; Referee: JD Williams

22 September 1973 9	Derby County	6–2	Southampton F.C.	Derby
	Hinton 7'; Davies 23', 77'; Hector 37', 56', 89'		41', 66' O’Neil	Stadium: Baseball Ground; Attendance: 25,500

29 September 1973 10	Tottenham Hotspur	1–0	Derby County	Tottenham
	Coates 36'			Stadium: White Hart Lane; Attendance: 30,408

6 October 1973 11	Derby County	1–1	Norwich City	Derby
	Davies 31'		21' Colin Suggett	Stadium: Baseball Ground; Attendance: 25,984

13 October 1973 12	Manchester United	0–1	Derby County	Greater Manchester
			5' Hector	Stadium: Old Trafford; Attendance: 43,624

20 October 1973 13	Derby County	2–1	Leicester City	Derby
	Hector 5'; McGovern 63'		57' Worthington	Stadium: Baseball Ground; Attendance: 34,205

27 October 1973 14	West Ham United	0–0	Derby County	Upton Park
				Stadium: Boleyn Ground; Attendance: 31,237

3 November 1973 15	Derby County	1–2	Queens Park Rangers	Derby
	Gemmill 66' (pen.)		11' Francis; 64' Bowles	Stadium: Baseball Ground; Attendance: 30,647

10 November 1973 16	Ipswich Town	3–0	Derby County	Ipswich
	Lambert 53', 75'; Beattie 69'			Stadium: Portman Road; Attendance: 23,562

17 November 1973 17	Sheffield United	3–0	Derby County	Sheffield
	Flynn 33'; Woodward 59'; Colquhoun 79'			Stadium: Bramall Lane; Attendance: 25,438

24 November 1973 18	Derby County	0–0	Leeds United	Derby
				Stadium: Baseball Ground; Attendance: 36,003

8 December 1973 19	Derby County	1–1	Arsenal	Derby
	McFarland 11'		79' (o.g.) Newton	Stadium: Baseball Ground; Attendance: 25,161

15 December 1973 20	Newcastle United	0–2	Derby County	Newcastle upon Tyne
			38' Davies; 83' Hinton	Stadium: St James' Park; Attendance: 18,535

22 December 1973 21	Derby County	2–0	Tottenham Hotspur	Derby
	Hinton 23', 56'			Stadium: Baseball Ground; Attendance: 23,672

26 December 1973 22	Stoke City	0–0	Derby County	Stoke-on-Trent
				Stadium: Victoria Ground; Attendance: 22,990

29 December 1973 23	Everton F.C.	2–1	Derby County	Liverpool
	Buckley 47'; Royle 67' (pen.)		87' Hector	Stadium: Goodison Park; Attendance: 37,429

1 January 1974 24	Derby County	1–1	Birmingham City	Derby
	Bourne 10'		30' Hatton	Stadium: Baseball Ground; Attendance: 31,189

12 January 1974 25	Derby County	5–1	Burnley F.C.	Derby
	Hector 10', 48', 61'; Bourne 33', 86'		84' James	Stadium: Baseball Ground; Attendance: 24,948

19 January 1974 26	Chelsea F.C.	1–1	Derby County	Fulham
	Garner 43'		44' Bourne	Stadium: Stamford Bridge; Attendance: 27,185

2 February 1974 27	Derby County	1–0	Newcastle United	Derby
	McFarland 26'			Stadium: Baseball Ground; Attendance: 24,992

6 February 1974 28	Manchester City	1–0	Derby County	Moss Side
				Stadium: Maine Road; Attendance: 22,845
Note: John McGovern made his final appearance before moving to Leeds United in August

16 February 1974 29	Derby County	2–2	Manchester United	Derby
	Nish; Hector		Greenhoff; Houston	Stadium: Baseball Ground; Attendance: 29,987

23 February 1974 30	Norwich City	2–4	Derby County	Norwich
	Howard 36'; Stringer 66'		4' Hector; 11', 65' Bourne; 17' Davies	Stadium: Carrow Road; Attendance: 25,412

2 March 1974 31	Derby County	1–1	Stoke City	Derby
	Bourne 3'		54' Ritchie	Stadium: Baseball Ground; Attendance: 28,176

5 March 1974 32	Southampton F.C.	1–1	Derby County	Southampton
	Channon		Newton	Stadium: The Dell; Attendance: 17,191

9 March 1974 33	Derby County	1–1	West Ham United	Derby
	Rioch 63' (pen.)		73' Bonds	Stadium: Baseball Ground; Attendance: 24,684

16 March 1974 34	Leicester City	0–1	Derby County	Leicester
			42' McFarland	Stadium: Filbert Street; Attendance: 30,423

23 March 1974 35	Derby County	2–0	Ipswich Town	Derby
	Rioch 51' (pen.); Hector 65'			Stadium: Baseball Ground; Attendance: 23,860

30 March 1974 36	Queens Park Rangers	0–0	Derby County	White City
				Stadium: Loftus Road; Attendance: 19,795

6 April 1974 37	Leeds United	2–0	Derby County	Leeds
	Lorimer 17'; Bremner 70'			Stadium: Elland Road; Attendance: 37,838

9 April 1974 38	Wolverhampton Wanderers	4–0	Derby County	Wolverhampton
				Stadium: Molineux Stadium; Attendance: 23,546

13 April 1974 39	Derby County	4–1	Sheffield United	Derby
	Davies 19'; Hector 48', 68', 86'		60' Woodward	Stadium: Baseball Ground; Attendance: 25,029

15 April 1974 40	Derby County	1–0	Coventry City	Derby
	Hector 40'			Stadium: Baseball Ground; Attendance: 23,348

20 April 1974 41	Arsenal F.C.	2–0	Derby County	Highbury
	Ball 52' (pen.); George 70'			Stadium: Highbury Park; Attendance: 26,017

27 April 1974 42	Derby County	2–0	Wolverhampton Wanderers	Derby
	Hector 38'; Powell 64'			Stadium: Baseball Ground; Attendance: 26,571

=== League Cup ===
==== Second Round ====
8 October 1973	Derby County	2-2	Sunderland F.C.	Derby
	Nish; Davies		, John Lathan	Stadium: Baseball Ground; Attendance: 29,172

29 October 1973 Replay	Sunderland F.C.	2-2 (a.e.t.)	Derby County
				Attendance: 38,935

31 October 1973 Replay Two	Derby County	0-3	Sunderland F.C.	Derby
				Stadium: Baseball Ground; Attendance: 38,460

=== FA Cup ===
==== Third Round ====
5 January 1974	Derby County	1–1	Boston United

9 January 1974 Replay	Boston United	1–6	Derby County

==== Fourth Round ====
27 January 1974	Coventry City	0-0	Derby County

30 January 1974 Replay	Derby County	0–1	Coventry City

== Statistics ==
=== Squad statistics ===
No.	Pos	Nat	Player	Total		Football League Division One		FA Cup		Football League Cup	
No.	Pos	Nat	Player	Apps	Goals	Apps	Goals	Apps	Goals	Apps	Goals
	GK	(England) ENG	Colin Boulton	49	-52	42	-42	4	-3	3	-7
	DF	(England) ENG	Ron Webster	45	0	38	0	4	0	3	0
	DF	(England) ENG	Roy McFarland	44	4	38	4	3	0	3	0
	DF	(England) ENG	Colin Todd	47	0	40	0	4	0	3	0
	DF	(England) ENG	David Nish	46	3	40	1	3	1	3	1
	MF	(Scotland) SCO	Bruce Rioch	18	2	13	2	4	0	1	0
	MF	(England) ENG	Steve Powell	34	1	29+1	1	4	0		
	MF	(Scotland) SCO	Archie Gemmill	45	5	38	1	4	3	3	1
	MF	(England) ENG	Alan Hinton	36	5	25+4	5	4	0	3	0
	FW	(England) ENG	Roger Davies	37	10	32+1	9	0+1	0	3	1
	FW	(England) ENG	Kevin Hector	49	19	42	19	4	0	3	0
	GK	(England) ENG	Graham Moseley	0	0	0	0	0	0	0	0
	MF	(Scotland) SCO	John McGovern	29	2	26	2	0	0	3	0
	MF	(England) ENG	Henry Newton	28	1	21	1	4	0	3	0
	FW	(England) ENG	Jeff Bourne	23	9	19	7	4	2		
	DF	(England) ENG	Peter Daniel	10	0	8	0	1+1	0		
	FW	(Scotland) SCO	John O'Hare	10	0	7+1	0	0	0	0+2	0
	DF	(Wales) WAL	Rod Thomas	5	0	4	0	1	0		
	DF	(England) ENG	Jim Walker	2	0	0+1	0	0+1	0		

- Source: https://www.11v11.com/teams/derby-county/tab/players/season/1974/comp/56/
