= 1974–75 Derby County F.C. season =

Derby County
1974–75 season
- Chairman: Sam Longson
- Manager: Dave Mackay
- Stadium: Baseball Ground
- First Division: Winners (In 1975-76 European Cup)
- FA Cup: Fifth round
- League Cup: Third round
- UEFA Cup: Third round
- Top goalscorer: League: Bruce Rioch (15); All: Kevin Hector (21)
- Highest home attendance: 38,000 v Carlisle United (26 April 1975)
- Lowest home attendance: 17,716 v Servette FC (18 September 1974)
- Average home league attendance: 26,719
Home colours

The 1974–75 season was Derby County's 75th in the Football League and their 48th season in the top flight. They won their second league title in four years to qualify for the 1975–76 European Cup.

== Season review ==
Whereas Brian Clough built his 1971–72 Championship winning team on discipline and a solid defence, Dave Mackay's 1974–75 side relied on attacking power to overwhelm its opponents. Midfielder Bruce Rioch bagged 15 goals to finish as the club's top league scorer, and the front three of Kevin Hector, Francis Lee and Roger Davies all contributed 12 or more. In March, Davies scored all the goals in a 5–0 win over Luton Town, becoming the first Derby player to net five times in a match since Hughie Gallacher in 1934. The Rams also put five past Queens Park Rangers and Burnley to finish the season as the league's leading scorers, though such abandon often left the side defensively frail and there were several heavy defeats along the way.

The season started in worrying fashion, with just one win in the club's opening seven fixtures, and despite a brief rally of six wins in 10 between September and November, a 1–0 defeat at Luton just before Christmas 1974 left them in 10th place. However, a run of just three defeats in their last 20 games, which saw them take 30 points from a possible 40, helped Derby surge up the table. A 0–0 draw away to Leicester City on the penultimate Saturday, combined with Ipswich Town drawing at Manchester City a few days later, confirmed the Rams as champions for the second time in four years.

Derby County First XI: 1974–75

Although domestic cup progress was limited (reaching the third round of the League Cup and the fifth round of the FA Cup), Derby's UEFA Cup debut proved relatively fruitful. A 6–2 aggregate victory over Servette FC was followed by a 4–4 aggregate draw with Atlético Madrid in the second round, both ties finishing 2–2. As a result, Derby took part in the club's first ever penalty shootout and overcame their opponents, winning 7–6. However, that was to be as good as it got for the Rams as Velež Mostar were able to overturn a 3–1 first league deficit to win 5–4 on aggregate and reach the quarter-finals.

Peter Daniel won the club's Player of the Season award after stepping in for Roy McFarland, who suffered an Achilles tendon injury whilst on international duty and missed all but the last five matches. Ron Webster became only the fifth player to break 500 appearances for Derby during his appearance in the defeat at Luton, while Colin Boulton broke the club record for goalkeeping appearances during the campaign on his way to a total of 344 appearances for the club. Colin Todd received the PFA Players' Player of the Year award, the only Derby County player ever to do so.

== Squad ==
Note: Flags indicate national team as defined under FIFA eligibility rules; some limited exceptions apply. Players may hold more than one non-FIFA nationality.

Pos.	Nation	Player
GK	ENG	Colin Boulton
GK	ENG	Graham Moseley
DF	ENG	Peter Daniel
DF	ENG	Roy McFarland
DF	ENG	David Nish
DF	WAL	Rod Thomas
DF	ENG	Colin Todd
DF	ENG	Ron Webster
MF	SCO	Archie Gemmill (Captain)
MF	ENG	Alan Hinton
MF	SCO	Jeff King

Pos.	Nation	Player
MF	ENG	Henry Newton
MF	ENG	Steve Powell
MF	SCO	Bruce Rioch
FW	ENG	Jeff Bourne
FW	SCO	Eric Carruthers
FW	ENG	Roger Davies
FW	IRL	Chris Egan
FW	ENG	Kevin Hector
FW	ENG	Francis Lee
FW	ENG	John Sims

=== Transfers ===
In
Pos.	Name	from	Type
FW	Francis Lee	Manchester City	

Out
Pos.	Name	To	Type
MF	John McGovern	Leeds United	
FW	John O'Hare	Leeds United	
DF	Jim Walker	Brighton and Hove Albion	
FW	John Sims	Oxford United	loan

== Competitions ==
=== Division One ===
==== League table ====
Pos	Team	Pld	W	D	L	GF	GA	GAv	Pts	Qualification or relegation
1	Derby County (C)	42	21	11	10	67	49	1.367	53	Qualification for the European Cup first round
2	Liverpool	42	20	11	11	60	39	1.538	51	Qualification for the UEFA Cup first round
3	Ipswich Town	42	23	5	14	66	44	1.500	51	Qualification for the UEFA Cup first round
4	Everton	42	16	18	8	56	42	1.333	50	Qualification for the UEFA Cup first round
5	Stoke City	42	17	15	10	64	48	1.333	49	

Source: World Football
Rules for classification: 1) Points; 2) Goal average; 3) Goals scored
(C) Champions

=== Results by round ===
Round	1	2	3	4	5	6	7	8	9	10	11	12	13	14	15	16	17	18	19	20	21	22	23	24	25	26	27	28	29	30	31	32	33	34	35	36	37	38	39	40	41	42	43
Ground	A	H	H	A	A	H	A	H	H	A	A	H	A	A	H	A	H	A	H	H	A	H	A	H	A	H	A	A	H	H	A	H	A	H	A	H	A	H	A	H	H	A	H
Result	D	D	W	D	L	D	L	W	W	D	D	W	W	L	L	W	W	L	W	P	D	L	L	W	W	W	W	L	D	W	L	W	W	L	W	W	W	W	D	W	W	D	D
Position	13	15	7	4	12	11	14	10	7	8	9	5	5	7	7	7	5	10	6	7	8	9	10	10	9	7	5	8	9	7	8	7	3	6	7	6	5	3	4	1	1	1	1

Source: Competitive matches
A = Away; H = Home; W = Win; D = Draw; L = Loss; = Leader, 1975–76 European Cup; = Classified to 1975–76 UEFA Cup; = Relegation to 1975–76 Division Two

==== Matches ====
17 August 1974 1	Everton	0–0	Derby County	Walton
		13		Stadium: Goodison Park; Attendance: 42,193

21 August 1974 2	Derby County	1–1	Coventry City	Derby
	Lee 68'	15	21' Mortimer	Stadium: Baseball Ground; Attendance: 25,717

24 August 1974 3	Derby County	2–0	Sheffield United	Derby
	Hector 4'; Davies 76'	7		Stadium: Baseball Ground; Attendance: 23,088

27 August 1974 4	Coventry City	1–1	Derby County	Coventry
	Carr 77'	4	20' Davies	Stadium: Highfield Road; Attendance: 18,586

31 August 1974 5	Tottenham Hotspur	2–0	Derby County	Tottenham
	Ritchie 46', 59'	12		Stadium: White Hart Lane; Attendance: 20,770

7 September 1974 6	Derby County	2–2	Newcastle United	Derby
	Davies 42'; Lee 51'	11	29' Macdonald; 61' Burns	Stadium: Baseball Ground; Attendance: 21,197

14 September 1974 7	Birmingham City	3–2	Derby County	Birmingham
15:00	Hatton 28'; Francis 64' (pen.); 79' (pen.)	14	84' Rioch; 87' Davies	Stadium: St. Andrews; Attendance: 27,345

21 September 1974 8	Derby County	3–2	Burnley	Derby
	Hector 46'; Rioch 55 ' (pen.); Lee 65'	10	19' (o.g.) Todd; 89' (o.g.) Daniel	Stadium: Baseball Ground; Attendance: 21,377

25 September 1974 9	Derby County	4–1	Chelsea	Derby
19:30 BST	Rioch 10'; Webster 24'; Daniel 35'; Hector 86'	7	14' Hutchinson	Stadium: Baseball Ground; Attendance: 22,036; Referee: Ken H Burns

28 September 1974 10	Stoke City	1–1	Derby County	Stoke-on-Trent
	Hurst 87'	8	75' Lee	Stadium: Victoria Ground; Attendance: 23,589

5 October 1974 11	West Ham United	2–2	Derby County	Upton Park
	Robson 8'; Bonds 59'	9	29' Lee; 80' Hector	Stadium: Boleyn Ground; Attendance: 32,900

12 October 1974 12	Derby County	1–0	Leicester City	Derby
	Rioch 39'	5		Stadium: Baseball Ground; Attendance: 24,753

15 October 1974 13	Sheffield United	1–2	Derby County	Sheffield
	Goal	5	Lee,	Stadium: Bramall Lane; Attendance: 21,882

19 October 1974 14	Carlisle United	3–0	Derby County	Carlisle
	Train 42'; Martin 65'; Clarke 69'	7		Stadium: Brunton Park; Attendance: 13,353

26 October 1974 15	Derby County	2–3	Middlesbrough	Derby
	Lee 36'; Hinton 69'	7	10' Hickton; 35' Foggon; 46' Mills	Stadium: Baseball Ground; Attendance: 24,036

2 November 1974 16	Leeds United	1–0	Derby County	Leeds
		7	78' Lee	Stadium: Elland Road; Attendance: 33,551

9 November 1974 17	Derby County	5–2	Queens Park Rangers	Derby
	Hector 31'; Rioch 34'; Hector 54'; Hector 66' Lee 72'	5	44' Leach; 88' Bowles	Stadium: Baseball Ground; Attendance: 23,339

16 November 1974 18	Arsenal	3–1	Derby County	London
	Ball 52'; Kidd 72'; Ball 79' (pen.)	10	75' (pen.) Rioch	Stadium: Highbury; Attendance: 32,286

23 November 1974 19	Derby County	2–0	Ipswich Town	Derby
	Hector; Rioch	6		Stadium: Baseball Ground; Attendance: 24,341

30 November 1974 20	Derby County	suspd.	Wolverhampton Wanderers	Derby
				Stadium: Baseball Ground
Note: Suspended because of a waterlogged pitch.

7 December 1974 21	Liverpool	2–2	Derby County	Liverpool
	Kennedy 18'; Heighway 22'	8	13' Bourne; 63' Davies	Stadium: Anfield Road; Attendance: 41,058

14 December 1974 22	Derby County	0–1	Everton	Derby
		9	66' Latchford	Stadium: Baseball Ground; Attendance: 24,991

21 December 1974 23	Luton Town	0–1	Derby County	Luton
	J Ryan 61' (pen.)	10		Stadium: Kenilworth Road; Attendance: 12,862

26 December 1974 24	Derby County	2–1	Birmingham City	Derby
	Bourne 38'; Rioch 65'	10	87' Hatton	Stadium: Baseball Ground; Attendance: 26,121

28 December 1974 25	Manchester City	2–1	Derby County	Moss Side
	Bell 64'	9	21' Newton; 65' Lee	Stadium: Maine Road; Attendance: 40,188

11 January 1975 26	Derby County	2–0	Liverpool	Derby
	Newton 39'; Lee 80'	7		Stadium: Baseball Ground; Attendance: 33,463

18 January 1975 27	Wolverhampton Wanderers	0–1	Derby County	Wolverhampton
15:00		5	32' Newton	Stadium: Molineux; Attendance: 24,515

1 February 1975 28	Queens Park Rangers	4–1	Derby County	Shepherd's Bush
	Givens 10'; Givens 80'; Thomas 87'; Givens 89'	8	3' Rioch	Stadium: Loftus Road; Attendance: 20,686

8 February 1975 29	Derby County	0–0	Leeds United	Derby
		9		Stadium: Baseball Ground; Attendance: 33,641

22 February 1975 30	Derby County	2–1	Arsenal	Derby
	Powell 2'; Powell 28'	7	23' Radford	Stadium: Baseball Ground; Attendance: 24,002

25 February 1975 31	Ipswich Town	3–0	Derby County	Ipswich
	Goal	8		Stadium: Portman Road; Attendance: 23,078

1 March 1975 32	Derby County	3–1	Tottenham Hotspur	Derby
	Rioch 30'; Daniel 37'; Davies 67'	7	11' Jones	Stadium: Baseball Ground; Attendance: 23,000

8 March 1975 33	Chelsea	1–2	Derby County	Fulham
15:00 Greenwich Mean Time	Hollins 62'	3	58' Daniel; 61' Hinton	Stadium: Stamford Bridge; Attendance: 22,644; Referee: Donald Biddle

15 March 1975 34	Derby County	1–2	Stoke City	Derby
	49'Hector	6	75' Greenhoff; 89' Greenhoff	Stadium: Baseball Ground; Attendance: 29,985

22 March 1975 35	Newcastle United	0–2	Derby County	Newcastle Upon Tyne
		7	16' Nish; 87' Rioch	Stadium: St. James' Park; Attendance: 31,010

29 March 1975 36	Derby County	5–0	Luton Town	Derby
	Davies 7'; Davies 11'; Davies 32'; Davies 78'; Davies 86'	6		Stadium: Baseball Ground; Attendance: 24,619

31 March 1975 37	Burnley	2–5	Derby County	Burnley
	Hankin 18'; James 66' (pen.)	5	1' Rioch; 20' Nish; 29' Davies; 78', 89' Hector	Stadium: Turf Moor; Attendance: 24,276

1 April 1975 38	Derby County	2–1	Manchester City	Derby
	Rioch; Rioch	3	Goal	Stadium: Baseball Ground; Attendance: 32,966

5 April 1975 39	Middlesbrough	1–1	Derby County	Middlesbrough
	Mills 34'	4	90' Hector	Stadium: Riverside; Attendance: 30,066

9 April 1975 20	Derby County	1–0	Wolverhampton Wanderers	Derby
	Lee 68'	1		Stadium: Baseball Ground; Attendance: 30,109; Referee: J Benet
Note: Originally scheduled for 30 November but was postponed because of a waterlogged pitch.

12 April 1975 40	Derby County	1–0	West Ham United	Derby
	Rioch 66'	1		Stadium: Baseball Ground; Attendance: 31,336

19 April 1975 41	Leicester City	0–0	Derby County	Leicester
15:00 Greenwich Mean Time		1		Stadium: Filbert Street; Attendance: 38,943

26 April 1975 42	Derby County	0–0	Carlisle United	Derby
		1		Stadium: Baseball Ground; Attendance: 38,000

=== League Cup ===
Date	Round	Opponents	H / A	Result F – A	Scorers	Attendance
11 September 1974	Second round	Portsmouth	A	5–1	Hector 2, Lee, Rioch, Roberts (og)	13,582
8 October 1974	Third round	Southampton	A	0–5		14,911

=== FA Cup ===
Date	Round	Opponents	H / A	Result F – A	Scorers	Attendance
4 January 1975	Third round	Orient	A	2–2	Todd 2	12,490
8 January 1975	Third round replay	Orient	H	2–1	Lee, Rioch	26,501
27 January 1975	Fourth round	Bristol Rovers	H	2–0	Hector, Rioch (pen)	27,980
18 February 1975	Fifth round	Leeds United	H	0–1		35,298

=== UEFA Cup ===
Date	Round	Opponents	H / A	Result F – A	Scorers	Attendance
18 September 1974	First round 1st Leg	(Switzerland) Servette FC	H	4–1	Hector 2, Daniel, Lee	17,716
2 October 1974	First round 2nd Leg	(Switzerland) Servette FC	A	2–1	Lee, Hector	9,600
Derby County win 6–2 on aggregate
23 October 1974	Second round 1st Leg	(Spain) Atlético Madrid	H	2–2	Nish, Rioch (pen)	29,347
6 November 1974	Second round 2nd Leg	(Spain) Atlético Madrid	A	2–2 (aet)	Rioch, Hector	35,000
4–4 on aggregate, Derby County win 7–6 on penalties
27 November 1974	Third round 1st Leg	(Socialist Federal Republic of Yugoslavia) Velež Mostar	H	3–1	Bourne 2, Hinton	26,131
11 December 1974	Third round 2nd Leg	(Socialist Federal Republic of Yugoslavia) Velež Mostar	A	1–4	Hector	15,000
Velež Mostar win 5–4 on aggregate

== Statistics ==
=== Players statistics ===
Substitute appearances indicated in brackets

No.	Pos	Nat	Player	Total		Football League Division One		Football League Cup		UEFA Cup		FA Cup	
No.	Pos	Nat	Player	Apps	Goals	Apps	Goals	Apps	Goals	Apps	Goals	Apps	Goals
	GK	(England) ENG	Colin Boulton	54	0	42	0	2	0	6	0	4	0
	DF	(England) ENG	Ron Webster	34	1	24	1	2	0	6	0	2	0
	DF	(England) ENG	Peter Daniel	49	4	37	3	2	0	6	1	4	0
	DF	(England) ENG	Colin Todd	50	2	39	0	2	0	5	0	4	2
	DF	(England) ENG	David Nish	49	3	38	2	2	0	5	1	4	0
	MF	(Scotland) SCO	Bruce Rioch	54	20	42	15	2	1	6	2	4	2
	MF	(Scotland) SCO	Archie Gemmill	52	0	41	0	2	0	6	0	3	0
	MF	(England) ENG	Henry Newton	48	3	35+1	3	1+1	0	6	0	4	0
	FW	(England) ENG	Roger Davies	49	12	39+1	12	2	0	2+1	0	3+1	0
	FW	(England) ENG	Kevin Hector	48	21	38	13	2	2	6	5	2	1
	FW	(England) ENG	Francis Lee	46	16	34	12	2	1	6	2	4	1
	GK	(England) ENG	Graham Moseley	0	0	0	0	0	0	0	0	0	0
	DF	(Wales) WAL	Rod Thomas	25	0	22	0	0	0	1	0	2	0
	MF	(England) ENG	Steve Powell	18	2	12+3	2	1	0	1	0	1	0
	MF	(England) ENG	Alan Hinton	19	3	8+5	2	0	0	0+4	1	0+2	0
	FW	(England) ENG	Jeff Bourne	27	4	7+10	2	0+1	0	4+1	2	3+1	0
	DF	(England) ENG	Roy McFarland	4	0	4	0	0	0	0	0	0	0
	MF	(Scotland) SCO	Jeff King	0	0	0	0	0	0	0	0	0	0
	FW	(Scotland) SCO	Eric Carruthers	0	0	0	0	0	0	0	0	0	0
	FW	(Ireland) EIR	Chris Egan	0	0	0	0	0	0	0	0	0	0
	FW	(England) ENG	John Sims	0	0	0	0	0	0	0	0	0	0
