= Sam Longson =

British businessman (1900–1989)

Sam Longson OBE
- Born: 11 April 1900; Near Chapel-en-le-Frith, Derbyshire, England
- Died: 17 January 1989 (aged 88); Buxton, Derbyshire, England
- Occupation: Businessman
- Known for: Founder of Sam Longson Limited
- Title: Chairman of Derby County F.C.
- Term: 1965–1977
- Successor: George Hardy
- Spouse: Constance Marion Ford (m. 1928)
- Children: 3
- Awards: OBE (1977)

Sam Longson OBE (11 April 1900 – 17 January 1989) was a British businessman and chairman of Derby County F.C. Longson founded a road haulage business in Chapel-en-le-Frith that became the largest in Derbyshire. He sold the company by 1967 and also built and sold a hire purchase business. Longson joined the board of directors of Derby County in 1952 and became the chairman in December 1965. He was instrumental in the appointment of Brian Clough as Derby County manager in May 1967, under whose leadership the club won the league title in May 1972. Clough helped win support to Longson as Chairman after he briefly lost the position. Longson's relationship with Clough broke down in 1973 and he accepted Clough's resignation after a disagreement over the manager's media appearances.

Longson appointed Dave Mackay to succeed Clough and the club won the league title again in 1975. Longson was appointed an Officer of the Order of the British Empire in the 1977 New Year Honours. Later that year he disagreed with some directors on the board who advocated for the return of Clough as manager. Longson resigned as chairman on 24 February 1980, though he remained as club president and was a director until 6 May.

== Early life and career ==
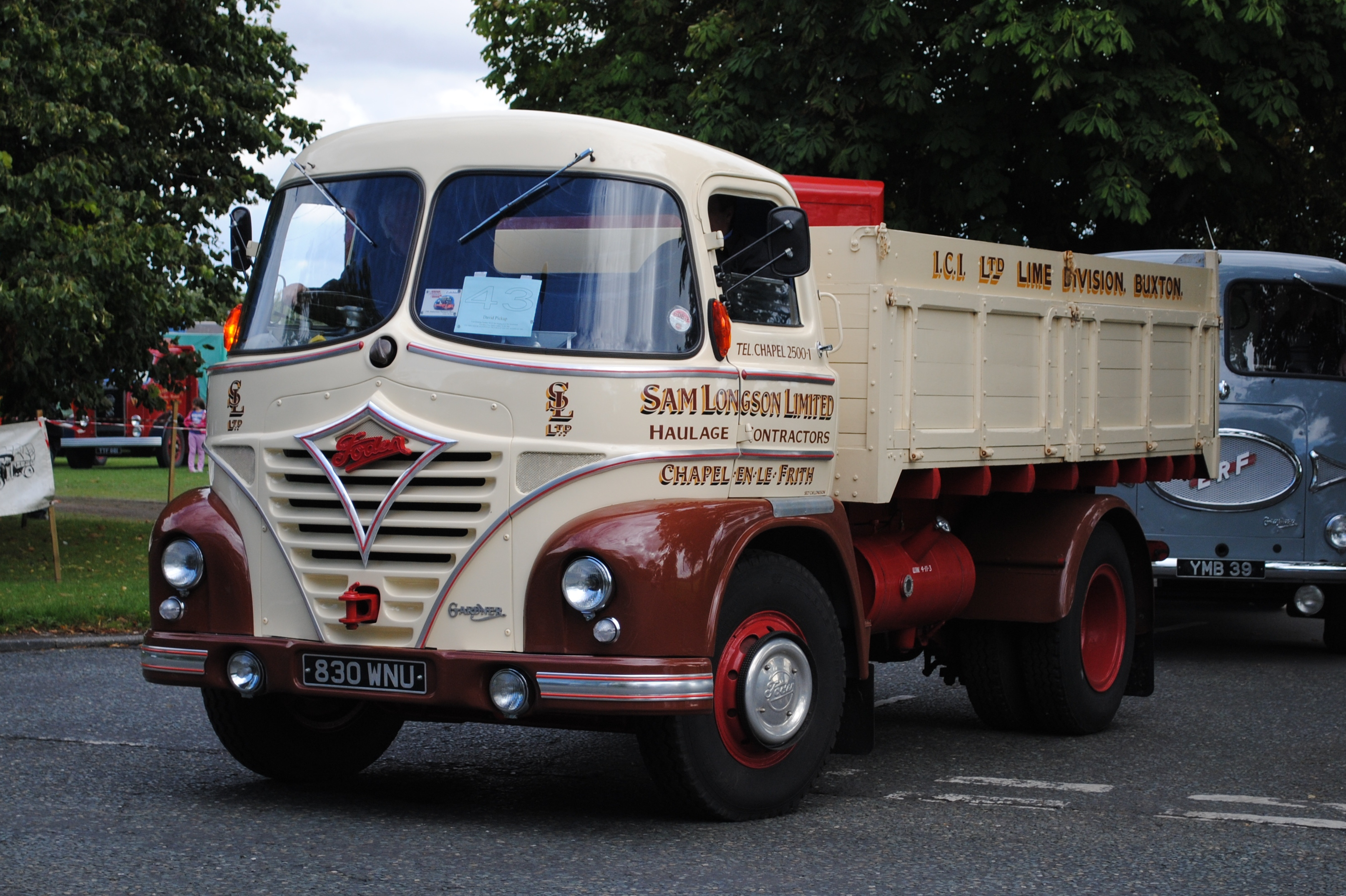
A tipper lorry in Sam Longson Limited livery

Sam Longson was born into a farming family near Chapel-en-le-Frith in the High Peak district of Derbyshire on 11 April 1900. When his father and two older brothers joined the military during the First World War, Longson took on responsibility for the farm. Longson made the farm's milk deliveries by horse drawn cart and also transported gunpowder to quarries. When his horse-drawn cart was upgraded to a Ford Model T he expanded the business, delivering mail, newspapers and building supplies. Longson went on to establish a haulage company initially using horse-drawn barges on canals, then with steam-powered traction engines and lastly with road lorries. When the 1922 railway strike disrupted the distribution of milk he pioneered the use of road transport to deliver Derbyshire milk to Manchester. In 1928 Longson married Constance Marion Ford, of Chapel-en-le-Firth, who helped him to expand the haulage business; the couple had three daughters.

Longson's firm, Sam Longson Limited, was formally incorporated on 20 October 1937. It was based in Chapel-en-le-Frith and carried stone and lime for Imperial Chemical Industries. The company amassed the largest road-haulage fleet in Derbyshire before its sale in 1966 to Thomas Tilling. Longson also owned the North Derbyshire Finance Company, a hire purchase business that he sold to the financial services company Leslie and Godwin. Other businesses included the Eldon Hill quarry (which he founded), a housebuilding firm and pig and dairy farms, including enterprises in Zululand which he visited regularly. Longson pioneered the growing of raspberries in Derbyshire, after observing farms in the Central Lowlands of Scotland.

Longson was prominent in Chapel-en-le-Frith and was president of the town's cricket club, band and chapel players and trustee of the Townend Methodist Church, the War Memorial Club and the Constitutional Hall. He also supported Buxton Opera House and the Cancer Research Campaign. During the Second World War, Longson raised large sums for the Aid to Russia Fund by holding public concerts featuring celebrities. He also exhibited his collection of more than 300 teapots for charity.

== Derby County ==
Longson was a lifelong fan of Derby County F.C. and joined the board of directors on 1 June 1955, just as the club had been relegated into the Football League Third Division North for the first time. He became chairman on 3 December 1965, at which point the manager was Tim Ward. Longson refused to renew Ward's contract, which expired after five years in May 1967. Ward had failed to achieve promotion from the Football League Second Division and Longson considered him "too much of a gentleman" to make a success of the job.

=== Brian Clough era ===
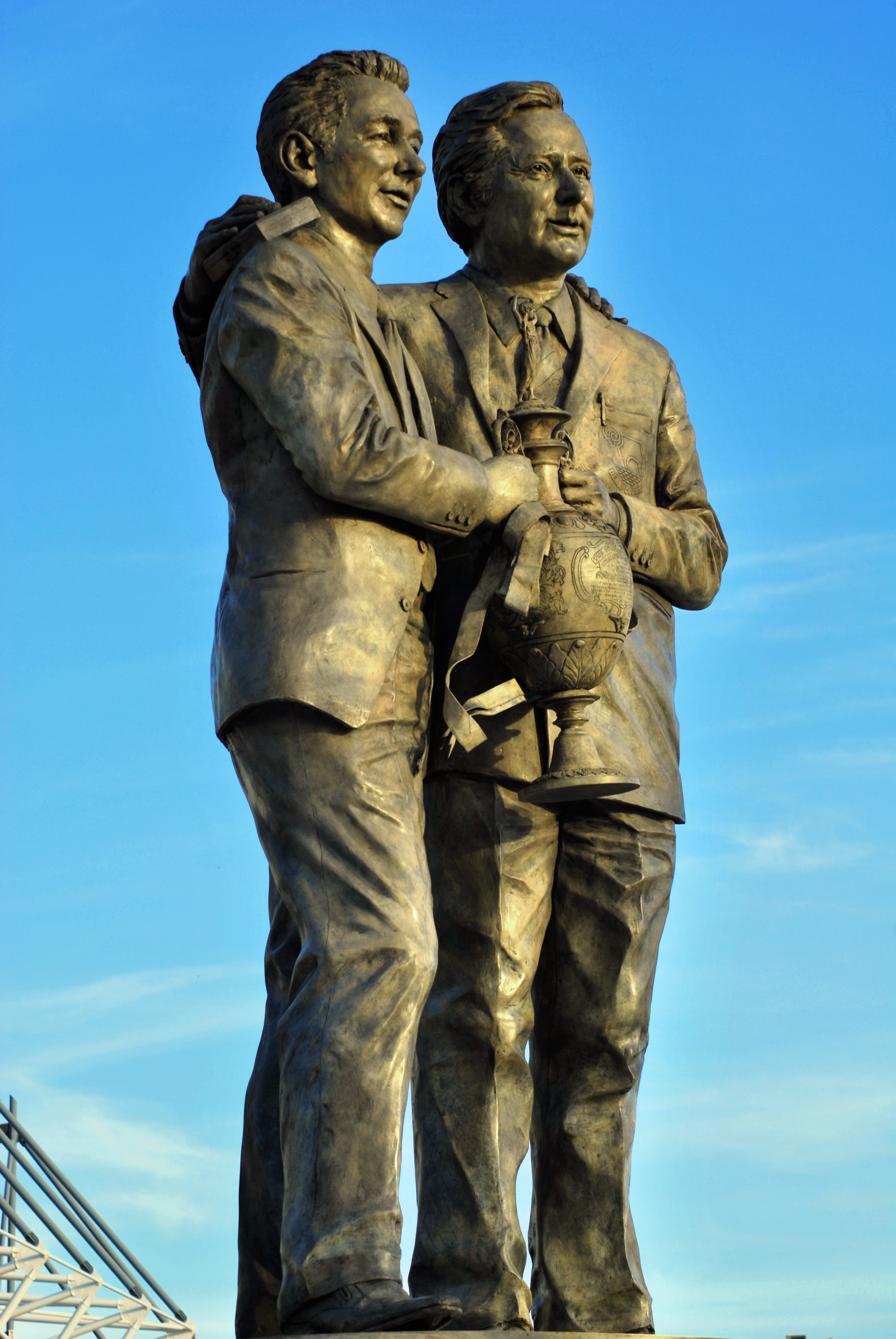
A statue of Clough and Taylor celebrating their league victory

While considering who to approach for the Derby County job Longson received a phone call from Len Shackleton, the former England player, who was then a football reporter in North East England. Shackleton recommended that Longson offer the job to Brian Clough, the manager of Fourth Division club Hartlepools United. Although he preferred candidates with more managerial experience and from better-placed clubs, Longson recalled Clough's active leadership role as a player with the Sunderland team when they visited the Baseball Ground. Longson met with Clough at the Scotch Corner hotel, having travelled from Derby in his Rolls-Royce with three other directors. Some of the directors considered Clough too "big-headed" for the role but Longson came away from the meeting with a good impression, considering Clough's style a welcome contrast from Ward's more withdrawn personality.

Clough, unusually for the period, had an assistant manager, Peter Taylor and it was agreed both would join Derby. Longson agreed to a £5,000 annual salary for Clough and made available £70,000 to fund player transfers. The pair took over officially on 1 June 1967. Derby under Clough were successful, achieving promotion to the First Division in 1969 and winning the league in 1972. Longson lost the chairmanship for part of this period to Sydney Bradley but, with Clough's support, regained it in 1970 when three directors were forced to resign after the Football Association (FA) imposed a £10,000 fine and a one-year ban from European competition for financial irregularities.

In the first years of Clough's managerial reign, he and Longson had a close relationship, and Longson initially viewed Clough almost as a son. However, the pair had fallings out over Clough's decisions to hire a secretary and agree transfers for Colin Todd (from Sunderland in February 1971 for £175,000) and Roger Davies (from Worcester City in the same year for £14,000). When Clough's initial contract expired in 1972, negotiations to extend it overran and almost resulted in him leaving Derby; an agreement for him to continue in the role was reached by the end of the year. Clough's drinking became problematic and there were arguments at the start of the 1972–73 season when the board of directors emptied and locked the club's drinks cabinet. Clough's decision to sign David Nish from Leicester City for a British record transfer fee of £250,000 without consulting the board was considered by Longson as proof that he was "out of control and had become too carried away with his own omnipotence". Longson was forced to apologise to the club's fans after Clough publicly insulted them after a September game against Liverpool.

There were also disputes over Clough's frequent media appearances; Longson was initially supportive of Clough's approach, thinking the publicity was good for the club, but later changed his mind. Because of Clough's outspoken appearances, when Longson visited other football clubs he was taunted with questions asking who really ran Derby County, him or Clough. Longson demanded that Clough send him copies of his newspaper columns before they were published; Clough was outraged. Clough wanted to eject Longson as chairman but failed to win sufficient support from the rest of the board. Early in the 1973–74 season Clough accepted an additional presenting role on ITV that Longson complained was negatively affecting his performance as manager. Clough and Taylor sent in their resignations four days later, expecting that Longson would back down, but he did not.

Taylor later recalled that Longson left him and Clough waiting outside his office when he called them in to discuss their resignation letters. When Longson called them in he accepted their resignations and told them they would receive no compensation from the club. When leaving, Taylor was called back and Longson offered him the manager's job, which Taylor refused on principle. Clough and Taylor were told to hand over the keys to their company cars, which they refused to do. Taylor claimed that the club cancelled their insurance and reported them to the police after they left but they escaped a fine after a tip-off from a friendly policeman. Longson wrote in his memoirs that he had been willing to offer Clough a five-year contract extension if he had agreed to end his media roles.

=== Post-Clough era ===
In the days around Clough's departure there was much press interest at the Baseball Ground. Residents moved their dining tables to their front windows to keep an eye on the comings and goings and Longson stayed in a nearby hotel, from where he gave impromptu press conferences while dressed in his pyjamas. Longson had the club's trainer Jimmy Gordon act as manager in the first games following Clough's departure. The first match, a 2–1 defeat of Leicester City on 20 October, was attended by Clough on a borrowed season ticket and he sat yards away from Longson. Taylor recalls Clough received huge applause from the crowd that Longson attempted to upstage by waving his arms from the director's box.

Longson appointed former player Dave Mackay as Clough's permanent replacement. The club, under Mackay, won the league again in 1974–75. By 1976 Longson was in the unusual position of having a grandson who was also chairman of a football club. That year he confirmed his opposition to the formation of a breakaway "super league" by some clubs in the FA (the Premier League would not be formed until 1992) and to bringing in more money from television rights or negotiations with the football pools.

Longson was appointed an Officer of the Order of the British Empire in the 1977 New Year Honours, by which time he was also Derby's club president. He was due to retire as chairman in summer that year. At the start of 1977 relations between the chairman and a faction of the board that wanted the return of Clough were acrimonious. Longson stormed out of a board meeting on 21 February and announced his resignation, proceeding around the ground, bidding farewell to staff. He actually resigned as chairman on 24 February following a long board meeting that reporters speculated was a power struggle between Longson and George Hardy. Longson left partway through the meeting and would be replaced as chairman by Hardy. Longson remained a director and was awarded the position of honorary club president for life. He resigned from the Derby County board on 6 May 1980. He died in Buxton on 17 January 1989, after a few years of illness. Longson's funeral was held on 20 January at the Townend Methodist Church in Chapel-en-le-Frith. Derby County players, clad in their training tracksuits, formed a guard of honour and the cortege was led by a Sam Longson Limited tractor unit; Mackay and Ward were among the attendees.

Longson was portrayed by Jim Broadbent in the 2009 film The Damned United, a fictional account of Clough's departure from Derby and his brief stint as manager of Leeds United. Longson wrote an autobiography in his later years, though refused to publish it as he did not want to offend Derby County or the family of Clough. The book was edited and published as Sam's Story by his son-in-law Robert Mulholland in 2014.

== Bibliography ==
- Dickinson, Wendy (2010). For Pete's Sake. Troubador Publishing. ISBN 978-1-84876-447-7.
- Ward, Andrew; Williams, John (2010). Football Nation: Sixty Years of the Beautiful Game. A&C Black. ISBN 978-1-4088-0126-0.
