= 1975 FA Charity Shield =

- Event: FA Charity Shield
Derby County	West Ham United
2	0
- Date: 9 August 1975
- Venue: Wembley Stadium, London
- Referee: Gordon Kew
- Attendance: 59,000

The 1975 FA Charity Shield was the 53rd FA Charity Shield, an annual football match played between the winners of the previous season's First Division and FA Cup competitions. The match was played on 9 August 1975 at Wembley Stadium and contested by Derby County, who had won the 1974–75 First Division, and West Ham United, who had won the 1974–75 FA Cup. Derby County won the match by 2–0.

== Match details ==
=== Summary ===
Kevin Hector opened the scoring for Derby in the 20th minute when he scored with a low right footed shot from the right of the penalty area. Roy McFarland got the second goal for Derby from two yards out after a corner from the left was headed back into the six yard box by Francis Lee.

=== Details ===
9 August 1975
15:00 BST

Derby County	2–0	West Ham United
Hector 20'; McFarland 43'	Report

Wembley Stadium, London
Attendance: 59,000
Referee: Gordon Kew (Amersham)

Derby County	West Ham United

GK	1	(England) Colin Boulton
DF	2	(Wales) Rod Thomas
DF	3	(England) David Nish
MF	4	(Scotland) Bruce Rioch
DF	5	(England) Roy McFarland (c)
DF	6	(England) Colin Todd
MF	7	(England) Henry Newton
MF	8	(Scotland) Archie Gemmill
FW	9	(England) Francis Lee
FW	10	(England) Kevin Hector
MF	11	(England) Charlie George
Substitutes:
GK	12	(England) Nigel Batch
MF	13	(England) Steve Powell
FW	14	(England) Jeff Bourne
Manager:
(Scotland) Dave Mackay

GK	1	(England) Mervyn Day
DF	2	(England) John McDowell
DF	3	(England) Frank Lampard
MF	4	(England) Pat Holland
DF	5	(England) Tommy Taylor
DF	6	(England) Kevin Lock
FW	7	(England) Alan Taylor
MF	8	(England) Graham Paddon
FW	9	(England) Billy Jennings	(substituted off) 72'
MF	10	(England) Trevor Brooking (c)
FW	11	(England) Bobby Gould	(substituted off) 63'
Substitutes:
MF	12	(England) Keith Coleman	(substituted on) 72'
MF	13	(England) Keith Robson	(substituted on) 63'
GK	14	(Scotland) Bobby Ferguson
Manager:
(England) John Lyall

Match rules

- 90 minutes, no extra time
- Maximum of three substitutions

== See also ==
- 1974–75 Football League
- 1974–75 FA Cup
