= Peter Daniel (footballer, born 1946) =

English footballer

Personal information
- Full name: Peter Aylmer Daniel
- Date of birth: 22 December 1946 (age 79)
- Place of birth: Stanley, Derbyshire, England
- Positions: Central defender; full back

Youth career
- 1963–1965: Derby County

Senior career*
Years	Team	Apps	(Gls)
1965–1979	Derby County	195	(7)
1978–1979	Vancouver Whitecaps	27	(1)
- Burton Albion
Total		222	(8)
- * Club domestic league appearances and goals

Peter Aylmer Daniel (born 22 December 1946) is a former professional footballer, most notable for his 14-year association with English football club Derby County. Although primarily utilised as a centre-back throughout his career, Daniel could also fulfill the role of full-back when required.

== Derby County ==
Daniel signed his first professional contract with Derby County in December 1964, having joined as an apprentice in August the previous year. He made his professional debut on 2 October 1965 in a 2–1 victory over Bristol City at the Baseball Ground and impressed manager Tim Ward enough to retain his first team place for the remainder of Ward's reign. However, a disappointing 17th-place finish in the 1966-67 season cost Ward his job and he was replaced by Brian Clough.

Clough instantly purged the Derby squad to mould the team to his desire, with Daniel one of only five players who remained with the club. However, the signing of Tranmere Rovers defender Roy McFarland for £25,000 severely restricted Daniel's first team involvement over the following seven years. As Clough took Derby County from 17th in the 1967 Football League Second Division to the 1973 European Cup Semi Finals Daniel was primarily employed as a reserve, making just 14 appearances between 1970 and 1973, and failing to register a single game in Derby's 1971-72 title winning campaign. Primarily used as a back-up for when Derby's established defensive stars were injured or away on national duty, Daniel was nevertheless a key figure in the victorious 1971-72 Central League reserve side.

Having made 101 appearances in his opening nine season with the club, the vast majority given in his opening 18 months with the club, Daniel was given his big chance when a severe injury to Roy McFarland, sustained whilst away on international duty with the England national side in May 1974, saw Daniel made first choice centre-back, alongside Colin Todd for Derby's 1974-75 campaign. Daniel had not played a single game when Derby first won the title in 1971–72, but stepped into the vacant number 5 shirt left by McFarland's injury, and played brilliantly as the Rams marched on to claim their second Championship in four seasons. Daniel netted four goals in all competition, included league strikes in victories over Chelsea (home) and Tottenham Hotspur (home and away) and an important goal in a 4-1 Uefa Cup victory over Servette. Whilst Todd eventually won the PFA Players' Player of the Year award, the Derby County support showed their appreciation of his efforts by naming him their Player of the Year with the award of the Jack Stamps Trophy.

Despite such outstanding achievements over the previous campaign, the return of McFarland to full fitness for the following season saw Daniel return to his status as back-up for his remaining four years at the club, as his made 49 appearances between 1975 and 1979, often filling in at fullback. Daniel's final first team appearance was on 16 December 1978 in a 2–0 defeat by Arsenal at Highbury. In all competitions he made 246 appearances for Derby, including nine as a substitute, during his 15 years at the Baseball Ground. Whenever selected he demonstrated a rugged determined style of play which rarely let down any of the five County managers he worked under.

== Late career ==
After leaving Derby, Daniel had a brief spell in America with NASL side the Vancouver Whitecaps, where he played alongside former Derby teammate Kevin Hector, making 27 appearances and scoring once, and was part of the side which won the 1979 Soccerbowl. After one season, he returned to England to wind-down his career with Staffordshire non-league side Burton Albion. He later ran a branch of the Post Office in Derbyshire and has remained a supporter of Derby County.

== Honours ==
=== Club ===
- Derby County
  - Football League First Division: 1974–75
  - Football League Second Division: 1968–69
  - FA Charity Shield: 1975
  - Watney Cup: 1971
  - Texaco Cup: 1972
  - The Central League: 1971–72
- Vancouver Whitecaps
  - NASL National Conference Western Division: 1979
  - Soccer Bowl: 1979

=== Personal ===
- Jack Stamps Trophy (Derby County F.C. Player of the Year): 1974–75
