= Archie Gemmill =

Scottish footballer and manager

Personal information
- Full name: Archibald Gemmill
- Date of birth: 24 March 1947 (age 79)
- Place of birth: Paisley, Scotland
- Height: 5 ft 5 in (1.65 m)
- Position: Midfielder

Senior career*
Years	Team	Apps	(Gls)
1964–1967	St Mirren	65	(9)
1967–1970	Preston North End	99	(13)
1970–1977	Derby County	261	(17)
1977–1979	Nottingham Forest	58	(4)
1979–1982	Birmingham City	97	(12)
1982	Jacksonville Tea Men	32	(2)
1982	Wigan Athletic	11	(0)
1982–1984	Derby County	63	(8)
Total		686	(65)

International career
1971–1981	Scotland	43	(8)

Managerial career
- 1994–1996: Rotherham United
- 2005–2009: Scotland U19
- * Club domestic league appearances and goals

Archibald Gemmill (born 24 March 1947) is a Scottish former footballer. During his career, he won the European Cup and three English league titles, and captained his national side.

Gemmill scored the third Scotland goal in a 3–2 win against the Netherlands in the 1978 FIFA World Cup. It has been cited as one of the greatest goals in the history of the World Cup.

== Club career ==
=== Early career ===
Gemmill was born in Paisley, Renfrewshire. His early career at St Mirren was ruined by a succession of injuries, not least a broken ankle in early 1966. He was sent on to replace Jim Clunie on 13 August 1966 in a Scottish League Cup tie at Shawfield to become the first tactical substitute in Scottish football history. Gemmill was sold for £13,000 to Preston North End.

=== Derby County ===
He came to the attention of Peter Taylor, Derby County's assistant manager. Taylor then told Derby manager, Brian Clough, about Gemmill who had been considering signing for the reigning champions Everton. Clough saw him as a player who could pass well and had the type of energy that would drive an attack forward. Clough drove to Gemmill's house. When the player refused to sign for Derby (who had never won the league title), Clough told him that he was going to sleep outside in the car. "But my wife invited him in and he stayed the night," Gemmill said. Clough, eventually, got his man for £60,000 over fried eggs the following morning.

Gemmill scored only three goals for the Rams that season, but they became Football League champions the following year. He was suspended for the second leg of the 1973 European Cup semi-final due to an accumulation of yellow cards, but he became club captain in place of the injured Roy McFarland when the Rams won their second title in 1975. He made 324 appearances in total for the club and scored 25 goals. He left Derby after playing five times for them early in the 1977/78 season.

=== Nottingham Forest ===
Gemmill joined Nottingham Forest for £25,000 in September 1977 becoming the third ex Derby title winning player of Clough's to join him at Forest. John O'Hare and John McGovern were the other two. He played 58 times for Forest in the league, scoring three goals. At the end of the 1977–78 season he had picked up a winners' medal as Forest won the First Division, but was ineligible for the League Cup, which they won, as he had played for Derby earlier in the competition. He was integral to the success of the club in the late 1970s, but was dropped for the 1979 European Cup final. Gemmill referred to the decision later:

I was devastated at the time. I was led to believe I'd be playing in the match... I was far from happy. I hated every minute of the 90 and I hated afterwards as well.

=== Later career ===
He signed for Birmingham City debuting on 18 August 1979 in a 4–3 defeat at home to Fulham. He played 97 League matches for the Blues, scoring 12 goals.

In early 1982, Gemmill crossed the Atlantic to play for the Jacksonville Tea Men of the NASL. He only stayed for one season playing 32 league games.

In September 1982, he joined up with former teammate and club manager Larry Lloyd at Wigan Athletic but only stayed for 11 matches. He returned to Derby County as player-coach to become Peter Taylor's first signing for the club in 1982. He retired from playing in 1984.

== International career ==
Gemmill played 43 times and scored eight goals for Scotland, and captained the team on 22 occasions.

The most famous moment of Gemmill's career, when he scored a goal against the Netherlands in a Group D fixture at the 1978 World Cup, has been rated as amongst the greatest goals ever scored in a World Cup match. Scotland needed to win the game by three goals to qualify for the next stage of the tournament, having had very poor results in their first two games. With his team leading 2–1 in the 68th minute, Gemmill scored a goal which was described by The Scotsman as follows:

In 68 minutes, however, Scotland went 3–1 up when Archie Gemmill scored one of the great goals of this World Cup so far. The little midfield player homed in on goal, played a magnificent one-two with Dalglish, then sprinted into the box and thumped a glorious goal past Jongbloed to revive all the hopes which had died the death this past fortnight. It was an extraordinary goal and an extraordinary moment. Suddenly Scotland were dreaming of glory again".

Three minutes later, Johnny Rep scored a second goal for the Netherlands, which was deflected off Gemmill's outstretched leg and flew past Alan Rough's dive. The game ended 3–2, denying Scotland a spot in the second round.

The goal is referenced in the film Trainspotting, in which characters Tommy and Lizzie decide to have sex while watching a homemade porno film, only to see it has been replaced with a football tape called "100 Great Goals" which features Gemmill's strike. At the same time, Renton (Ewan McGregor), who had switched the tapes in their cases and borrowed Tommy and Lizzie's tape, says after climaxing during sex, "I haven't felt that good since Archie Gemmill scored against Holland in 1978!" Gemmill first saw Trainspotting on a club outing with Rotherham, and his reaction was: "I got absolutely slaughtered by the lads... to be fair I was a bit embarrassed by it."

== After playing ==
Gemmill returned to Nottingham Forest to be a coach alongside Brian Clough in 1984. Later he managed Rotherham United for two seasons in the mid-1990s.

His son Scot Gemmill became a Scotland player in the 1990s. In 1970, Archie drove his pregnant wife back to Scotland to ensure that Scot would be born there. Archie became unhappy that Scot was selected for squads but was rarely used in games. He eventually told Scot to stop making himself available for selection, but Scot disagreed and continued to play for Scotland until late in his career.

Gemmill managed the Scotland national under-19 football team that finished second in the 2006 UEFA European Under-19 Football Championship and thereby qualified for the 2007 FIFA U-20 World Cup in Canada.

== Career statistics ==
=== International appearances ===
Appearances and goals by national team and year
National team	Year	Apps	Goals
Scotland	1971	3	1
Scotland	1972	4	0
Scotland	1975	2	0
Scotland	1976	6	1
Scotland	1977	7	0
Scotland	1978	10	4
Scotland	1979	2	1
Scotland	1980	7	1
Scotland	1981	2	0
Total		43	8

=== International goals ===
Scores and results list Scotland's goal tally first

No.	Date	Venue	Opponent	Score	Result	Competition	Ref
1.	13 October 1971	Hampden Park, Glasgow	Portugal	2–1	2–1	UEFA Euro 1972 qualifying	
2.	8 May 1976	Hampden Park, Glasgow	Northern Ireland	1–0	3–0	1975–76 British Home Championship	
3.	22 February 1978	Hampden Park, Glasgow	Bulgaria	1–1	2–1	Friendly match	
4.	11 June 1978	Estadio Ciudad de Mendoza, Mendoza	Netherlands	2–1	3–2	1978 FIFA World Cup	
5.	11 June 1978	Estadio Ciudad de Mendoza, Mendoza	Netherlands	3–1	3–2	1978 FIFA World Cup	
6.	25 October 1978	Hampden Park, Glasgow	Norway	3–2	3–2	UEFA Euro 1980 qualifying	
7.	17 October 1979	Hampden Park, Glasgow	Austria	1–1	1–1	UEFA Euro 1980 qualifying	
8.	26 March 1980	Hampden Park, Glasgow	Portugal	4–1	4–1	UEFA Euro 1980 qualifying	

== Honours ==
=== Player ===
Derby County

- Football League First Division: 1971–72, 1974–75
- FA Charity Shield: 1975

Nottingham Forest

- Football League First Division: 1977–78
- Football League Cup: 1978–79
- FA Charity Shield: 1978
- European Cup: 1978–79

=== Manager ===
Rotherham United

- Football League Trophy: 1995–96

== See also ==
- List of Scotland national football team captains
- List of Scottish football families
