= Progression of the British football transfer fee record =

Progression of record for the highest transfer fee in the British football league

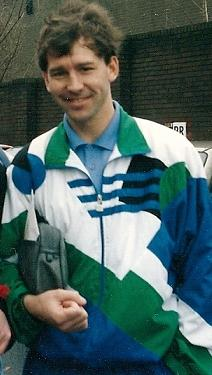
Bryan Robson (pictured in 1992) was the subject of a record transfer in 1981.

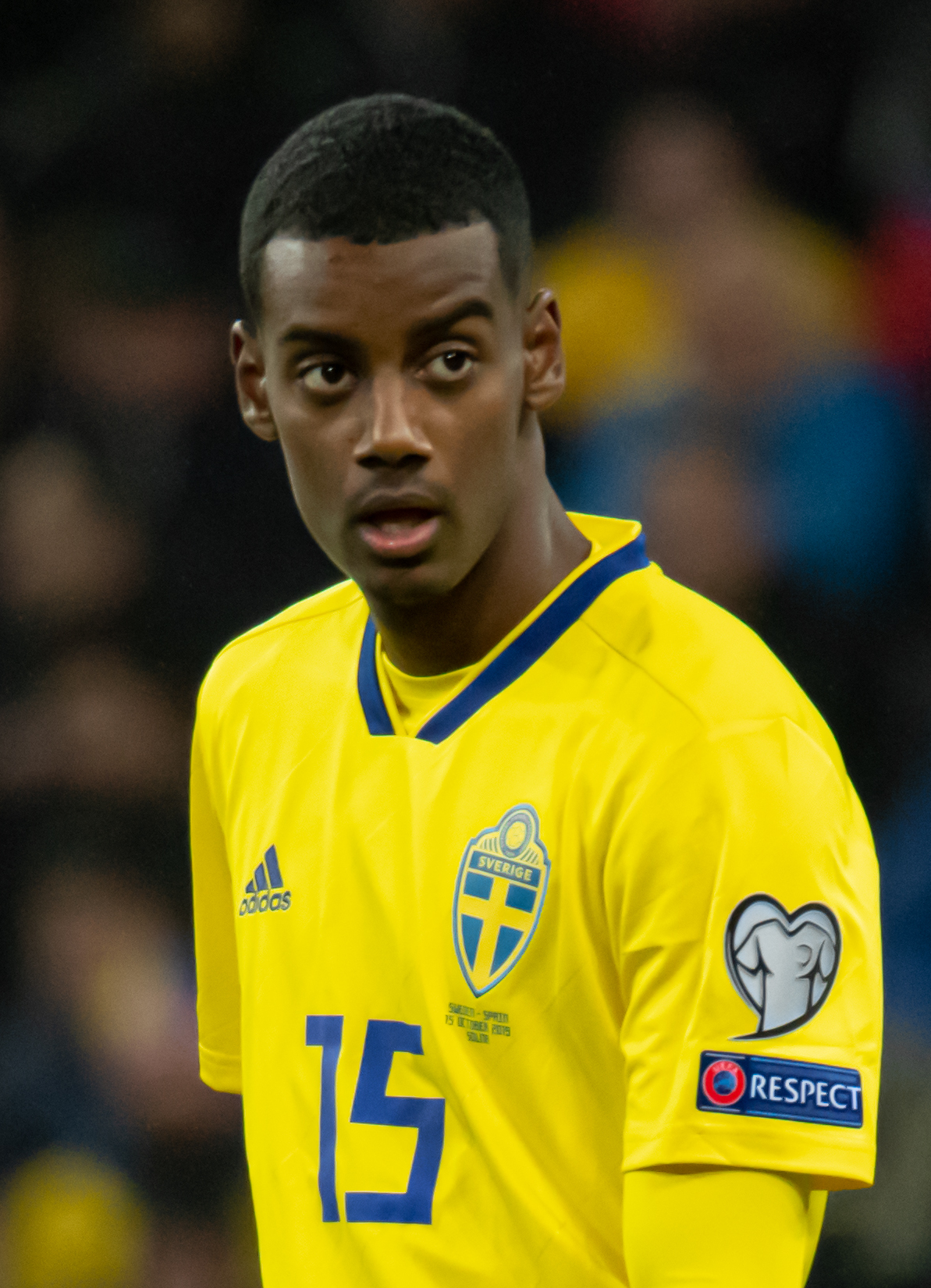
Alexander Isak (pictured) was the subject of the current British football transfer fee record, set in 2025.

The progression of the British football transfer fee record tracks the increases in the record for the highest transfer fee paid or received by British association football clubs. A transfer fee is the sum of money paid by one club to purchase the contract, and therefore the playing services, of a professional footballer. Fees are not generally formally disclosed by the clubs involved, and discrepancies can occur in figures quoted in the press. Trevor Francis, for example, is regarded as Britain's first £1m player but was officially transferred for £975,000. The generally reported figure of £1,180,000 included Value Added Tax, fees to the Football League and Francis' signing fee. Discrepancies may also occur due to deals which involve additional sums to be paid at a later date after a player has made a certain number of appearances, joint fees for two or more players, or deals in which one player is exchanged for a sum of money plus another player.

The first three-figure transfer fee was the £100 paid by Aston Villa in 1893 for Willie Groves. Eleven years later, Alf Common joined Middlesbrough for the first four-figure fee, a sum which caused a national sensation and outrage amongst the football authorities. The £5,000 mark was first reached in 1922 when Falkirk paid that amount for West Ham United's Syd Puddefoot, and six years later Arsenal paid the first £10,000 fee to acquire David Jack of Bolton Wanderers. After the Second World War, the spending power of clubs in mainland Europe outstripped that of British clubs for the first time, resulting in several substantial jumps in the transfer record. John Charles became the first player from Britain to command a fee of £50,000 when he joined Juventus in 1957 from Leeds United, and four years later Denis Law joined Torino in the first £100,000 transaction involving a British club.

The 1970s saw a rapid increase in transfer fees. Martin Peters became the first £200,000 player in 1970, but by 1977 Kevin Keegan's move to West Germany's Hamburger SV had taken the record to £500,000. In January 1979 David Mills became the first player to be purchased for £500,000 by a British club, but just one month later Nottingham Forest paid twice that amount to acquire Birmingham City's Trevor Francis. In 1981 Bryan Robson cost Manchester United £1,500,000, but fees paid by British clubs lagged behind those paid by clubs in Italy, France and Spain. The fees paid by the Premier League's top clubs began to increase at a rapid rate, with Alan Shearer commanding the first £15,000,000 fee in 1996, paid by Newcastle United and the new millennium heralding the first £30,000,000 transfer, although sources differ as to whether this barrier was broken by Rio Ferdinand's move to Manchester United in 2002 or Andriy Shevchenko's transfer to Chelsea four years later.

On 1 September 2008, Manchester City agreed a reported £32,500,000 fee for Robinho, which remained the record amount paid by a British club until 31 January 2011, when Liverpool paid £35,000,000 for Andy Carroll from Newcastle United, which was also a new record amount paid for a British player. A few hours later, the record amount paid by a British club was broken again when Chelsea paid £50,000,000 for Fernando Torres from Liverpool.

On 11 June 2009, Manchester United announced that they had accepted an £80,000,000 bid from Real Madrid for Cristiano Ronaldo. The transfer was completed on 1 July 2009, setting not only a new British transfer record, but also a new world record (either in pounds or euros). In turn, that record was broken on 1 September 2013 when Real announced that their £85.3 million (€100 million) purchase of Gareth Bale from Tottenham Hotspur had been completed. This record was broken on 8 August 2016, when Manchester United signed Paul Pogba from Juventus for a fee of £89 million, again on 6 January 2018, when Philippe Coutinho moved to Barcelona from Liverpool for a reported initial fee of £105 million, which could rise to £142 million with various clauses being met.

On 31 January 2023, the record was broken when Chelsea signed Argentine player Enzo Fernández for a reported deal of £106.8 million. It was broken again on 1 September 2025 when Swedish striker Alexander Isak joined Liverpool from Newcastle United for a reported £125 million.

== Record progression ==
Date	Player	From	To	Fee	Reference
1893	(Scotland) Willie Groves	(England) West Bromwich Albion	(England) Aston Villa	£100	
April 1899	(England) Jimmy Settle	(England) Bury	(England) Everton	£400	
October 1903	(England) Benny Green	(England) Barnsley	(England) Small Heath	£500	
January 1904	(Scotland) Andy McCombie	(England) Sunderland	(England) Newcastle United	£700	
February 1905	(England) Alf Common	(England) Sunderland	(England) Middlesbrough	£1,000	
November 1907	(Scotland) George Wilson	(England) Everton	(England) Newcastle United	£1,600	
February 1911	(England) John Simpson	(Scotland) Falkirk	(England) Blackburn Rovers	£1,800	
October 1911	(England) Billy Hibbert	(England) Bury	(England) Newcastle United	£1,950	
November 1913	(England) George Utley	(England) Barnsley	(England) Sheffield United	£2,000	
February 1914	(England) Percy Dawson	(Scotland) Heart of Midlothian	(England) Blackburn Rovers	£2,500	
March 1920	(England) Joe Lane	(England) Blackpool	(England) Birmingham	£3,650	
May 1920	(Scotland) Johnny Crosbie	(Scotland) Ayr United	(England) Birmingham	£3,700	
November 1920	(England) Stan Fazackerley	(England) Sheffield United	(England) Everton	£4,000	
December 1920	(England) David Mercer	(England) Hull City	(England) Sheffield United	£4,500	
February 1922	(England) Syd Puddefoot	(England) West Ham United	(Scotland) Falkirk	£5,000	
March 1922	(England) Warney Cresswell	(England) South Shields	(England) Sunderland	£5,500	
November 1923	(Scotland) Andy Wilson	(England) Middlesbrough	(England) Chelsea	£6,000	
December 1925	(England) Bob Kelly	(England) Burnley	(England) Sunderland	£6,500	
April 1927	(Scotland) Jimmy Gibson	(Scotland) Partick Thistle	(England) Aston Villa	£7,500	
October 1928	(England) David Jack	(England) Bolton Wanderers	(England) Arsenal	£10,647	
August 1938	(Wales) Bryn Jones	(England) Wolverhampton Wanderers	(England) Arsenal	£14,000	
September 1947	(Scotland) Billy Steel	(Scotland) Morton	(England) Derby County	£15,500	
November 1947	(England) Tommy Lawton	(England) Chelsea	(England) Notts County	£20,000	
February 1948	(England) Len Shackleton	(England) Newcastle United	(England) Sunderland	£20,500	
February 1949	(England) Johnny Morris	(England) Manchester United	(England) Derby County	£24,000	
December 1949	(England) Eddie Quigley	(England) Sheffield Wednesday	(England) Preston North End	£26,500	
October 1950	(Wales) Trevor Ford	(England) Aston Villa	(England) Sunderland	£30,000	
March 1951	(England) Jackie Sewell	(England) Notts County	(England) Sheffield Wednesday	£34,500	
July 1955	(Italy) Eddie Firmani	(England) Charlton Athletic	(Italy) Sampdoria	£35,000	
April 1957	(Wales) John Charles	(England) Leeds United	(Italy) Juventus	£65,000	
June 1961	(England) Gerry Hitchens	(England) Aston Villa	(Italy) Internazionale	£85,000	
December 1961	(England) Jimmy Greaves	(Italy) AC Milan	(England) Tottenham Hotspur	£99,999	
July 1962	(Scotland) Denis Law	(Italy) Torino	(England) Manchester United	£115,000	
January 1968	(England) Martin Chivers	(England) Southampton	(England) Tottenham Hotspur	£125,000	
June 1968	(England) Allan Clarke	(England) Fulham	(England) Leicester City	£150,000	
June 1969	(England) Allan Clarke	(England) Leicester City	(England) Leeds United	£165,000	
March 1970	(England) Martin Peters	(England) West Ham United	(England) Tottenham Hotspur	£200,000	
December 1971	(England) Alan Ball	(England) Everton	(England) Arsenal	£220,000	
August 1972	(England) David Nish	(England) Leicester City	(England) Derby County	£225,000	
January 1974	(England) Alan Hudson	(England) Chelsea	(England) Stoke City	£240,000	
February 1974	(England) Bob Latchford	(England) Birmingham City	(England) Everton	£350,000	
June 1977	(England) Kevin Keegan	(England) Liverpool	(Germany) Hamburger SV	£500,000	
January 1979	(England) David Mills	(England) Middlesbrough	(England) West Bromwich Albion	£516,000	
February 1979	(England) Trevor Francis	(England) Birmingham City	(England) Nottingham Forest	£1,180,000	
September 1979	(England) Steve Daley	(England) Wolverhampton Wanderers	(England) Manchester City	£1,450,000	
September 1979	(Scotland) Andy Gray	(England) Aston Villa	(England) Wolverhampton Wanderers	£1,469,000	
October 1981	(England) Bryan Robson	(England) West Bromwich Albion	(England) Manchester United	£1,500,000	
May 1984	(England) Ray Wilkins	(England) Manchester United	(Italy) Milan	£1,500,000	
May 1986	(Wales) Mark Hughes	(England) Manchester United	(Spain) Barcelona	£2,300,000	
June 1987	(Wales) Ian Rush	(England) Liverpool	(Italy) Juventus	£3,200,000	
July 1989	(England) Chris Waddle	(England) Tottenham Hotspur	(France) Marseille	£4,250,000	
July 1991	(England) David Platt	(England) Aston Villa	(Italy) Bari	£5,500,000	
August 1991	(England) Trevor Steven	(Scotland) Rangers	(France) Marseille	£5,500,000	
June 1992	(England) Paul Gascoigne	(England) Tottenham Hotspur	(Italy) Lazio	£5,500,000	
January 1995	(England) Andy Cole	(England) Newcastle United	(England) Manchester United	£7,000,000	
June 1995	(Netherlands) Dennis Bergkamp	(Italy) Internazionale	(England) Arsenal	£7,500,000	
June 1995	(England) Stan Collymore	(England) Nottingham Forest	(England) Liverpool	£8,500,000	
July 1996	(England) Alan Shearer	(England) Blackburn Rovers	(England) Newcastle United	£15,000,000	
August 1999	(France) Nicolas Anelka	(England) Arsenal	(Spain) Real Madrid	£22,500,000	
July 2001	(Argentina) Juan Sebastián Verón	(Italy) Lazio	(England) Manchester United	£28,100,000	
July 2002	(England) Rio Ferdinand	(England) Leeds United	(England) Manchester United	£29,100,000 (Note: Ferdinand's fee was also quoted as £30m, with the potential to rise to £33.3m based on additional clauses. Also reported as £29.3m, the total amount paid was eventually reduced by £1.75m to help Leeds avoid entering administration.)	
July 2006	(Ukraine) Andriy Shevchenko	(Italy) Milan	(England) Chelsea	£30,800,000	
September 2008	(Brazil) Robinho	(Spain) Real Madrid	(England) Manchester City	£32,500,000	
July 2009	(Portugal) Cristiano Ronaldo	(England) Manchester United	(Spain) Real Madrid	£80,000,000	
September 2013	(Wales) Gareth Bale	(England) Tottenham Hotspur	(Spain) Real Madrid	£85,300,000	
July 2016	(France) Paul Pogba	(Italy) Juventus	(England) Manchester United	£89,000,000	
January 2018	(Brazil) Philippe Coutinho	(England) Liverpool	(Spain) Barcelona	£105,000,000	
January 2023	(Argentina) Enzo Fernández (1)	(Portugal) Benfica	(England) Chelsea	£106,800,000	
September 2025	(Sweden) Alexander Isak	(England) Newcastle United	(England) Liverpool	£125,000,000	
September 2026	(Argentina) Enzo Fernández (2)	(England) Chelsea	(England) Manchester City	£125,000,000	

== See also ==
- List of most expensive association football transfers
- Transfer (football)
