= John O'Hare =

Scottish footballer (born 1946)

Personal information
- Date of birth: 24 September 1946 (age 80)
- Place of birth: Renton, Scotland
- Height: 5 ft 8 1/2 in (1.74 m)
- Position: Forward

Youth career
- 1963–1964: Sunderland

Senior career*
Years	Team	Apps	(Gls)
1964–1967	Sunderland	51	(14)
1967	Vancouver Royal Canadians	11	(1)
1967–1974	Derby County	248	(65)
1974–1975	Leeds United	6	(1)
1975–1981	Nottingham Forest	101	(14)
1977–1978	Dallas Tornado	40	(14)
- Belper Town
Total		417	(95)

International career
1970–1972	Scotland	13	(5)
- * Club domestic league appearances and goals

John O'Hare (born 24 September 1946) is a Scottish former footballer. O'Hare's clubs included Sunderland, Derby County, Leeds United and also Nottingham Forest and was part of their European Cup victory in 1980, coming on as a substitute in the final. O'Hare also won thirteen caps for the Scotland national team, scoring five goals.

== Early years ==
Born in Renton, West Dunbartonshire, he attended St Martins School and then went on to St Patrick's High School in Dumbarton.

== Career ==
=== Sunderland ===
O'Hare started his senior career with Sunderland, playing for the first team between 1964 and 1967.

=== Derby County ===
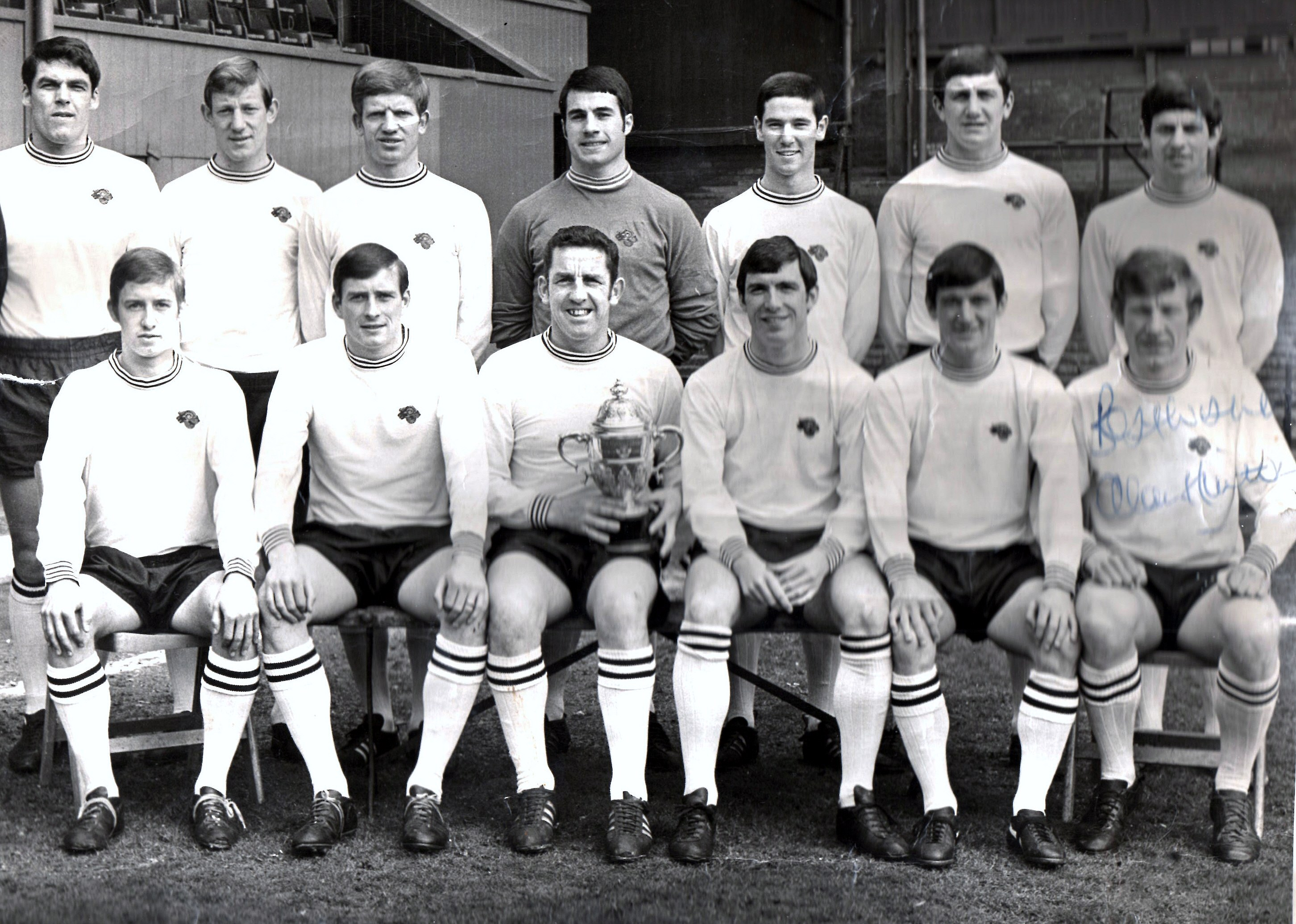
O'Hare (seated, second from left) with Derby County's Second Division winning team of 1968–69

He then moved to Derby County for £20,000 in 1967. There was initial criticism of him as he was seen as a large but slow striker, however, their manager Brian Clough, who had coached him at Sunderland, persisted with him and in his second season he justified his fee, establishing a strike partnership with Kevin Hector as they led the Rams to the 1971–72 Football League First Division title.

At County, O'Hare won thirteen caps for the Scotland national team, scoring five goals.

After Clough's departure he fell out of favour with his successor, and former Derby captain, Dave Mackay.

=== Leeds United ===
O'Hare followed Clough from Derby to Leeds United in 1974 alongside John McGovern for £125,000; however, Clough left Leeds after only 44 days.

=== Nottingham Forest ===
O'Hare and McGovern re-united with Clough at Nottingham Forest in February 1975 for a combined fee of £130,000. Forest were promoted to the top flight at the end of the 1976–77 season. In their first season back-up, Forest won the league by seven points (two points for a win) and won the 1979 European Cup Final the following season.

In the 1977–78 season O'Hare played football in the North American Soccer League for Dallas Tornado, with forty appearances and 14 goals.

=== Later career ===
O'Hare later worked as a Scout for Leicester City under Martin O'Neill then moved to Celtic as Scout and Aston Villa as Scout along with his great friend John Robertson and as a host of the executive/VIP guest suite at Nottingham Forest's home games.

== Career statistics ==
=== As a player ===
Appearances and goals by club, season and competition
Club	Season	League			FA Cup		League Cup		Europe		Other^{[A]}		Total	
Club	Season	Division	Apps	Goals	Apps	Goals	Apps	Goals	Apps	Goals	Apps	Goals	Apps	Goals
Sunderland	1964–65	First Division	5	0	0	0	0	0	—		—		5	0
Sunderland	1965–66	First Division	17	6	0	0	0	0	—		—		17	6
Sunderland	1966–67	First Division	29	8	3	1	0	0	—		—		32	9
Sunderland	Total		51	14	3	1	0	0	—		—		54	15
Vancouver Royal Canadians	1967	United Soccer Association	11	1	—		—		—		—		11	1
Derby County	1967–68	Second Division	42	12	1	0	7	6	—		—		50	18
Derby County	1968–69	Second Division	41	10	1	0	7	0	—		—		49	10
Derby County	1969–70	First Division	41	13	2	2	6	1	—		—		49	16
Derby County	1970–71	First Division	42	13	3	1	3	1	—		3	1	51	16
Derby County	1971–72	First Division	40	13	5	0	2	0	—		5	4	52	17
Derby County	1972–73	First Division	34	4	5	0	3	0	8	1	—		50	5
Derby County	1973–74	First Division	8	0	0	0	2	0	—		—		10	0
Derby County	Total		248	65	17	3	30	8	8	1	8	5	311	82
Leeds United	1974–75	First Division	6	1	0	0	0	0	0	0	0	0	6	1
Nottingham Forest	1974–75	Second Division	10	2	0	0	0	0	—		—		10	2
Nottingham Forest	1975–76	Second Division	39	9	2	0	4	0	—		—		45	9
Nottingham Forest	1976–77	Second Division	19	3	5	0	2	1	—		6	2	32	6
Nottingham Forest	1977–78	First Division	10	0	1	0	2	1	—		—		13	1
Nottingham Forest	1978–79	First Division	11	0	0	0	2	0	1	0	0	0	14	0
Nottingham Forest	1979–80	First Division	7	1	4	2	0	0	1	0	0	0	12	3
Nottingham Forest	1980–81	First Division	0	0	0	0	1	0	0	0	0	0	1	0
Nottingham Forest	Total		96	15	12	2	11	2	2	0	6	2	127	21
Career total			412	96	32	6	41	10	10	1	14	7	509	120

A. The "Other" column constitutes appearances and goals in the FA Charity Shield, Anglo-Scottish Cup, Football League Trophy, Watney Cup, Texaco Cup, European Super Cup and Intercontinental Cup.

=== International appearances ===
Appearances and goals by national team and year
National team	Year	Apps	Goals
Scotland	1970	4	2
Scotland	1971	6	2
Scotland	1972	3	1
Total		13	5

=== International goals ===
Scores and results list Scotland's goal tally first

No.	Date	Venue	Opponent	Score	Result	Competition	Ref
1.	18 April 1970	Windsor Park, Belfast	Northern Ireland	1–0	1–0	1969–70 British Home Championship	
2.	11 November 1970	Hampden Park, Glasgow	Denmark	1–0	1–0	UEFA Euro 1972 qualifying	
3.	13 October 1971	Hampden Park, Glasgow	Portugal	1–0	2–1	UEFA Euro 1972 qualifying	
4.	10 November 1971	Pittodrie Stadium, Aberdeen	Belgium	1–0	1–0	UEFA Euro 1972 qualifying	
5.	26 April 1972	Hampden Park, Glasgow	Peru	1–0	2–0	Friendly match	

== Honours ==
Derby County

- Football League First Division: 1971–72
- Football League Second Division: 1968–69
- Texaco Cup: 1971–72
- Watney Cup: 1970

Nottingham Forest

- Football League First Division: 1977–78
- Football League Cup: 1977–78
- Anglo-Scottish Cup: 1976–77
- FA Charity Shield: 1978
- European Cup: 1978–79, 1979–80
- European Super Cup: 1979
