= Graham Moseley =

English footballer

Personal information
- Full name: Graham Moseley
- Date of birth: 16 November 1953 (age 72)
- Place of birth: Manchester, England
- Height: 6 ft 0 in (1.83 m)
- Position: Goalkeeper

Youth career
- Blackburn Rovers

Senior career*
Years	Team	Apps	(Gls)
1971–1972	Blackburn Rovers	0	(0)
1972–1977	Derby County	32	(0)
1974	→ Aston Villa (loan)	3	(0)
1977	→ Walsall (loan)	3	(0)
1977–1986	Brighton & Hove Albion	189	(0)
1986–1988	Cardiff City	38	(0)
Total		289	(0)

International career
1972	England Youth	7	(0)
- * Club domestic league appearances and goals

Graham Moseley (born 16 November 1953) is an English former professional footballer who played in the 1983 FA Cup Final with Brighton & Hove Albion.

Moseley began his career as an apprentice at Blackburn Rovers, and also played for Derby County, Aston Villa, Walsall, Brighton & Hove Albion and Cardiff City.

In 1990, shortly after his retirement from the competitive game aged 33, due to injuries from a car accident, a Brighton Wembley legends side faced Tottenham Hotspur in a friendly at the Goldstone Ground. Paul Gascoigne bagged a brace and Paul Stewart also scored as the modern-day Spurs side won 3–0.

== Honours ==
Brighton & Hove Albion

- FA Cup runner-up: 1982–83
