= Henry Newton (footballer) =

English footballer (1944–2026)

Personal information
- Date of birth: 18 February 1944
- Place of birth: Nottingham, England
- Date of death: 13 April 2026 (aged 82)
- Height: 5 ft 8 in (1.73 m)
- Position: Midfielder

Youth career
- Nottingham Forest

Senior career*
Years	Team	Apps	(Gls)
1963–1970	Nottingham Forest	282	(17)
1970–1973	Everton	77	(5)
1973–1977	Derby County	117	(5)
1977–1978	Walsall	16	(0)

International career
1964–1967	England U23	4	(2)
- * Club domestic league appearances and goals

Henry Newton (18 February 1944 – 13 April 2026) was an English football midfielder who made almost 500 league appearances for Football League teams during the 1960s and 1970s.

== Career ==
Newton started at his home town club Nottingham Forest and played 282 League matches for them. In total he made 315 senior appearances for them, scoring 15 goals, and he was at the club when they finished runners-up in the Football League First Division in 1966–67.

He left the club in 1970 to join Everton and played his first game for the "Toffees" on 17 October 1970. He was to make 85 senior appearances and score 6 goals for them before moving to Derby County, his last game for the club coming in September 1973.

Newton made over 100 League appearances at Derby before finishing his career at Walsall. At Derby he was part of the team that won the First Division in 1975.

He was capped by the England under-23 side on four occasions, making his debut on 25 November 1964 against Romania. Newton also played for the Football League XI in 1970, in a match against the Scottish League XI.

== Death ==
Newton died on 13 April 2026, at the age of 82.
