= Steve Powell =

English footballer (born 1955)

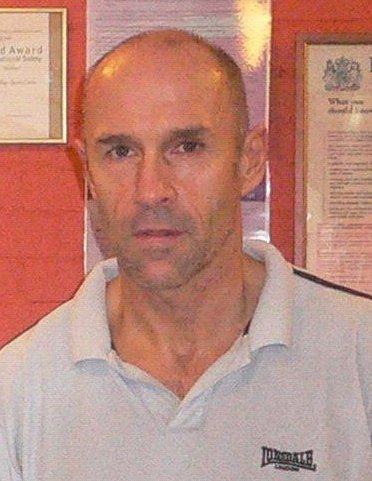

Personal information
- Full name: Stephen Powell
- Date of birth: 20 September 1955 (age 71)
- Place of birth: Derby, England
- Positions: Midfielder; defender

Senior career*
Years	Team	Apps	(Gls)
1971–1985	Derby County	352	(20)
1979	→ Tulsa Roughnecks (loan)	19	(1)

International career
1970–1971	England Schoolboys	12	(0)
1973–1974	England Youth	8	(0)
1974	England U23	1	(0)

Managerial career
- 1990–1991: Burton Albion
- * Club domestic league appearances and goals

Stephen Powell (born 20 September 1955) is an English former professional footballer who played as a midfielder or defender. He spent the majority of his career at Derby County where he played 420 times, placing him in the top ten for total appearances for the club. He also played for Tulsa Roughnecks in the NASL.

== Early life ==
Powell, the son of ex-Derby County player Tommy Powell, went to Gayton Avenue Junior School, in the Littleover suburb of Derby, at the age of 11 he then moved to the Bemrose School just like his father once had many years before him.

== Career ==
While at Bemrose School, Powell impressed the then Derby County managerial team of Brian Clough and Peter Taylor enough for Clough to sign him for Derby County on a visit to the school premises. Powell then went on to make his first team debut aged 16 years and 30 days in a Texaco Cup tie against Stoke City, which Derby County won 3–2. He made his league debut three days later aged 16 years and 33 days in the 2–1 win against Arsenal. Whilst at Derby County, Powell played as defender and midfielder. Powell made 352 appearances in the league for The Rams, scoring twenty goals. Powell won the player of the year (now named the Jack Stamps trophy) in the 1978–79 season.

Powell went from a schoolboy star into an exceptional professional league player. Despite playing in a declining league side towards the end of his Derby County career, Powell was completely dedicated to Derby County. He was part of the team during some of their highest and lowest moments. Derby won the First Division title twice during his time at the club; he made three appearances in the 1971–72 success but played more regularly during the 1974–75 title winning season with 15 appearances. There was also a European Cup semi-final appearance in 1973, relegation to the Second Division in 1980 and relegation to the Third Division in 1984. He retired in 1985 after well over a decade with the Rams, who had missed out on promotion back to the Second Division but would follow it up with two successive promotions.

Powell and his father, Tommy appeared in 824 senior games between them for Derby County, scoring 85 goals.

Powell later worked at Derby College.

== Honours ==
- First Division: 1971–72, 1974–75
- Texaco Cup: 1972
