= John Sims (footballer) =

English footballer and manager

Personal information
- Date of birth: 14 August 1952 (age 74)
- Place of birth: Belper, England
- Position: Forward

Senior career*
Years	Team	Apps	(Gls)
1970–1975	Derby County	3	(0)
1973	→ Luton Town (loan)	3	(1)
1974	→ Oxford United (loan)	7	(1)
1975	→ Colchester United (loan)	2	(0)
1975–1978	Notts County	61	(13)
1978–1979	Exeter City	34	(11)
1979–1983	Plymouth Argyle	163	(43)
1983–1984	Torquay United	30	(8)
1984	Exeter City	25	(6)
1984–1985	Torquay United	17	(3)
Total		345	(86)
- * Club domestic league appearances and goals

John Sims (born 14 August 1952 in Belper, Derbyshire) is an English former professional footballer. He played predominantly as a forward for Plymouth Argyle, and briefly managed Torquay United.
