= Roger Davies (footballer) =

English footballer

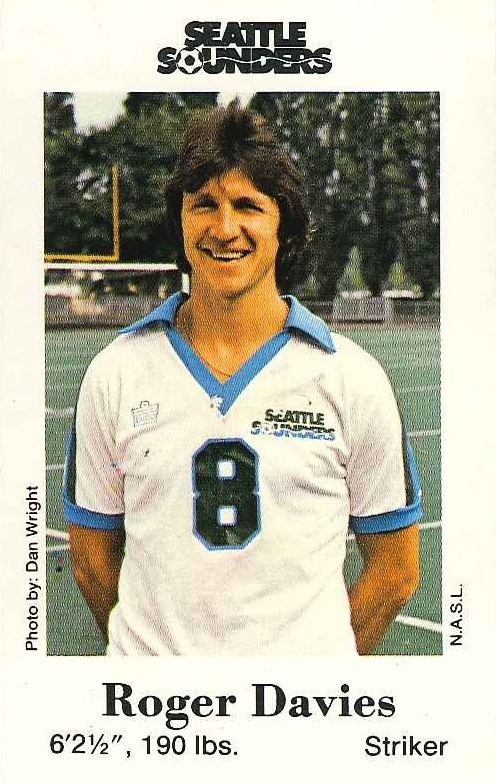

Personal information
- Date of birth: 25 October 1950 (age 76)
- Place of birth: Wolverhampton, England
- Position: Forward

Senior career*
Years	Team	Apps	(Gls)
1968–1970	Bridgnorth Town		
1970–1971	Bedford Town	?	(13)
1971	Worcester City	10	(7)
1971–1976	Derby County	114	(31)
1972	→ Preston North End (loan)	2	(0)
1976–1977	Club Brugge	34	(21)
1977–1979	Leicester City	26	(6)
1979	Tulsa Roughnecks	22	(8)
1979–1980	Derby County	22	(3)
1980–1982	Seattle Sounders	65	(32)
1980–1981	→ Seattle Sounders (indoor)	7	(9)
1983	Fort Lauderdale Strikers	18	(3)
1983	Burnley	0	(0)
1983–1984	Darlington	10	(1)
1984–1986	Gresley Rovers	70	(11)
1986–1987	Stapenhill		

International career
1974	England U23	1	(0)

Managerial career
- 1984–1985: Gresley Rovers
- * Club domestic league appearances and goals

Roger Davies (born 25 October 1950) is an English retired football forward who played professionally in England, Belgium and the United States. He was capped by England at under-23 level. He also provided radio commentary for Derby County games.

== Early years ==
Davies was born and grew up in Wolverhampton where he played football from a young age. When he was fifteen, he left school and became an apprentice in an engineering company. However, he continued to play during his free time, up to three or four games a week.

== Europe ==
When he turned eighteen, he joined Bridgnorth Town which itself had just joined the amateur Midland Football Combination. Davies spent three seasons with Bridgnorth. In the summer of 1971, he signed with Worcester City of the Southern Football League. He performed well enough to come to the attention of Derby County's manager who purchased Davies' contract for £12,000 in September 1971. He spent the 1971–1972 season with the Derby County reserves in the Central League where he won the league championship. Derby then loaned Davies to Preston North End at the start of the 1972–1973 season. He made his league debut with Preston on 26 August 1972. After two appearances for Preston, he returned to Derby, where he began to see first team time. In 1973, he became a part of Derby County lore during a third round FA Cup replay at Tottenham Hotspur. At the eighty-minute mark, Tottenham held a 3–1 lead, all but assured of advancement to the next round when Davies scored twice in quick succession to tie the game. He rounded out a hat trick in extra time as Derby eliminated Tottenham 5–3. In 1975, Davies and his teammates, including Alan Hinton who would play a large part in his future career, took the First Division championship. During that season Davies scored all five goals in a 5–0 win over Luton Town.

In August 1976, Davies moved to Jupiler League team Club Bruges for £135,000. He spent just over a season with Bruges, winning Belgium Player of the Year and the League and Cup double in 1977. In December 1977, he returned to England when Leicester City purchased his contract.

== North American Soccer League ==
In the spring of 1979, Alan Hinton, now managing the Tulsa Roughnecks in the North American Soccer League induced Davies to move to the United States. He spent the summer season in Tulsa suffering from injuries which limited him to twenty-two games.

In autumn 1979, Davies returned to England, where he rejoined Derby County. By this time, Derby had fallen from the heights of the mid-1970s and were relegated at the end of the season.

While Davies was in England, Hinton had been hired to manage the Seattle Sounders. On 14 December 1979, he convinced the Sounders to trade the Roughnecks for rights to Davies' services. In 1980, Davies returned to the States where he signed with the Sounders. That season was one of his best. He scored twenty-five goals in twenty-nine games (0.86 strike rate) and was chosen as the league's most valuable player as voted on by his fellow players. Davies played two more seasons in Seattle, before being traded to the Fort Lauderdale Strikers. He played only eighteen games in 1983, scoring three goals and left the league to return to England.

== England ==
In 1983, he signed with Darlington F.C. of the Football League Fourth Division after a brief stop at Burnley F.C. He played only ten games with Darlington before moving to Gresley Rovers of the West Midlands (Regional) League in February 1984. Over the next two and a half years, he played seventy games for Gresley, scoring eleven goals. In June 1984, he also took over responsibility for managing the team. In November 1985, Gresley released Davies and four other players who quickly moved to Stapenhill F.C. in the Leicestershire Senior League.

While now retired from playing, he continues to devote himself to the game as a radio commentator for Derby games.
