= Colin Boulton =

English footballer

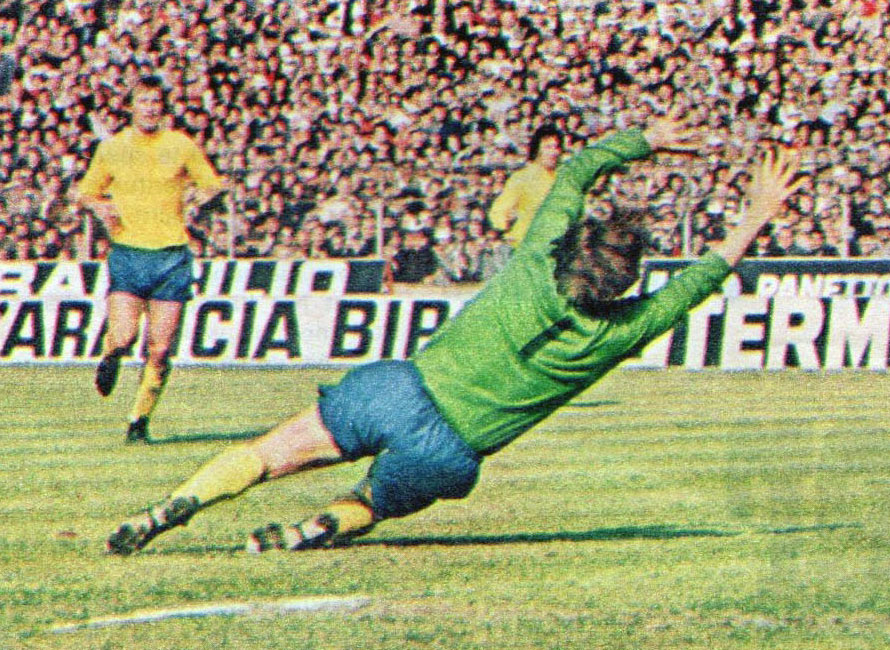
- Boulton playing for Derby County in 1973

Personal information
- Full name: Colin Donald Boulton
- Date of birth: 12 September 1945 (age 81)
- Place of birth: Cheltenham, England
- Height: 5 ft 11 in (1.80 m)
- Position: Goalkeeper

Youth career
- Charlton Kings
- Gloucester Police

Senior career*
Years	Team	Apps	(Gls)
1964–1978	Derby County	272	(0)
1976	→ Southampton (loan)	5	(0)
1978–1979	Tulsa Roughnecks	46	(0)
1979	Los Angeles Aztecs	12	(0)
1980–1981	Lincoln City	4	(0)
- * Club domestic league appearances and goals

Colin Donald Boulton (born 12 September 1945) is an English former footballer who played as a goalkeeper.

== Football career ==
"Solid", "dependable", "ever present" are among the things that were said about him. Boulton was the only Derby County player to take part in all 84-league games during the team's two Championship winning seasons.

Boulton was born in Cheltenham. His career began at Charlton Kings, then he played for Gloucester Police. Boulton was actually a Police Cadet in Cheltenham when he was noticed by Rams manager Tim Ward. Boulton arrived at the Baseball Ground in August 1964. His course to the first team was not always a smooth one, and it must have seemed to him that he was being overlooked as Brian Clough signed Rochdale keeper Les Green in 1968. It took another three seasons for Boulton to get his chance in the first team. Boulton kept 23 clean sheets during the Championship-winning 1971–72 season. He was also ever present in the team that won the First Division in 1975.

In September 1976, Boulton joined Southampton on loan for a month, as manager Lawrie McMenemy had lost confidence in Ian Turner (who had helped "the Saints" win the FA Cup only a few months earlier) and reserve 'keeper Steve Middleton. He played five league games for The Dell club, winning two and losing two, including a 6–2 defeat at Charlton Athletic and victory at Wolverhampton Wanderers by the same scoreline; in his five games, he conceded 11 goals.

Boulton went on to make 344 first team appearances for Derby County before a move to America where he played for Tulsa Roughnecks and Los Angeles Aztecs between 1979 and 1980.

Boulton's final team was back in England, where he played for Lincoln City. However, in his fourth game he sustained an injury that was to end his playing career.

On 2 March 2009, it was announced that Boulton had been voted the greatest goalkeeper in Derby County's history.

== Later career ==
On retiring from football, he initially returned to his original career as a police officer, but by the mid-1990s, he was working for a Huddersfield-based sports company.

== Honours ==
Derby County

- Football League First Division champions: 1971–72, 1974–75
- 1975 FA Charity Shield
