= Alan Hinton =

English footballer and manager

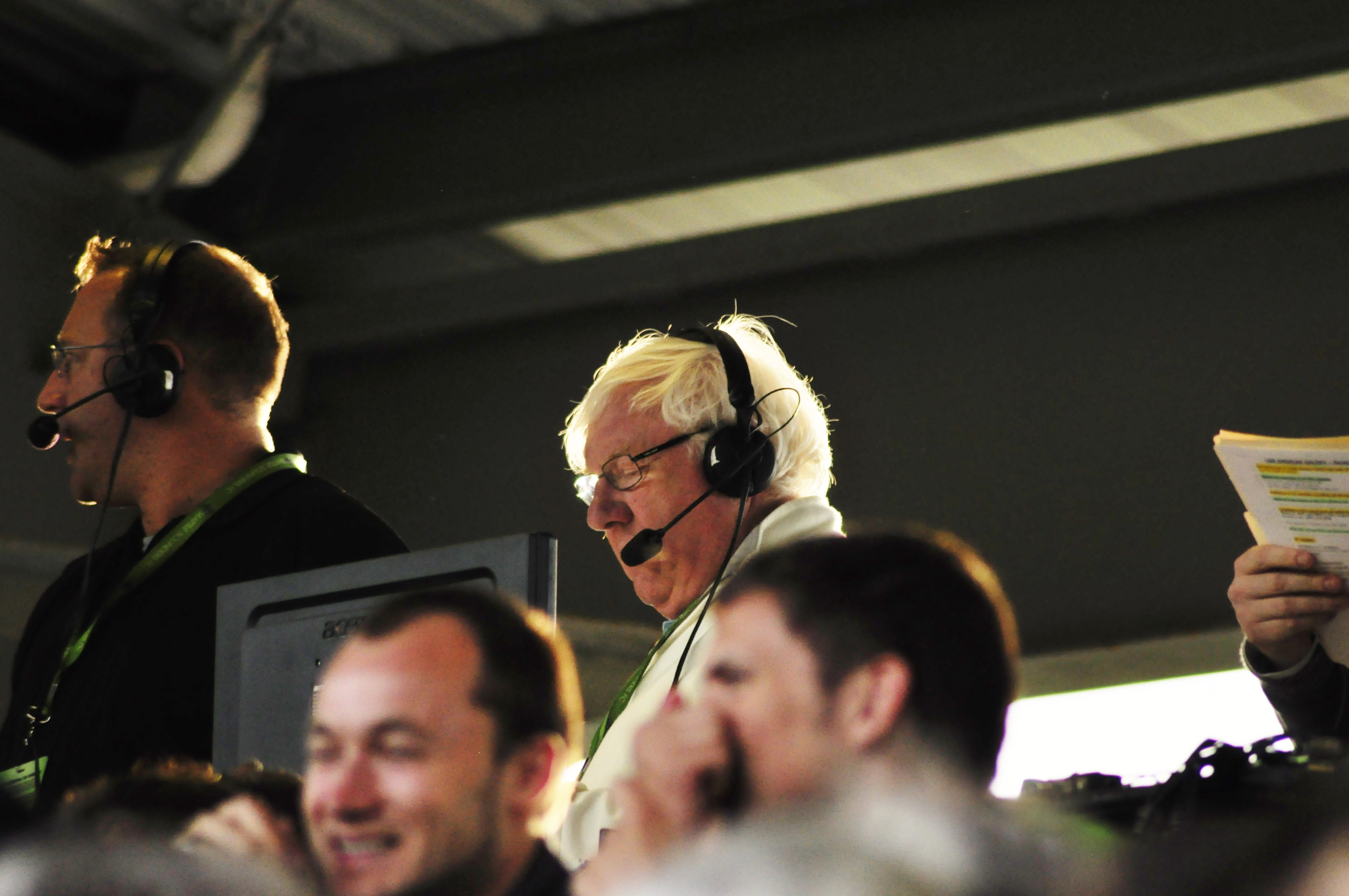
- Hinton announcing a Seattle Sounders FC match in 2011

Personal information
- Full name: Alan Thomas Hinton
- Date of birth: 6 October 1942 (age 84)
- Place of birth: Wednesbury, England
- Height: 1.76 m (5 ft 9 in)
- Position: Left wing

Youth career
- 1959–1961: Wolverhampton Wanderers

Senior career*
Years	Team	Apps	(Gls)
1961–1964	Wolverhampton Wanderers	75	(29)
1964–1967	Nottingham Forest	112	(24)
1967–1975	Derby County	253	(63)
1976	Borrowash Victoria		
1977	Dallas Tornado	24	(4)
1978	Vancouver Whitecaps	29	(1)

International career
1962–1964	England	3	(1)
1963–1964	England U23	7	(6)

Managerial career
- 1979: Tulsa Roughnecks
- 1980–1982: Seattle Sounders
- 1984: Vancouver Whitecaps
- 1985–1990: Tacoma Stars
- 1994: Seattle Sounders
- * Club domestic league appearances and goals

Alan Thomas Hinton (born 6 October 1942) is an English former footballer who played at the top level of English football from 1961 to 1975. He famously wore white football boots.

== Playing career ==
=== Wolverhampton Wanderers ===
Hinton started his career in the youth ranks at Wolverhampton Wanderers in October 1959, before making his senior debut on 7 January 1961 in a 1–1 draw with Huddersfield Town in the FA Cup. He came into the Wolves team during the 1961–62 season when he managed 16 appearances, scoring 5 times. The following season, he was a first choice in the wide left position, from where he netted 19 times, making him their leading goalscorer. He also won a call-up to the England team during this season when he played against France on 3 October 1962 in a European Championship qualifier at Hillsborough.

=== Nottingham Forest ===
Johnny Carey became Forest manager in 1963 signing Hinton in January 1964. Carey assembled a team including Hinton, Ian Storey-Moore, and Joe Baker that for a long spell went largely unchanged in challenging for the 1966–67 Football League title. They beat title rivals Manchester United 4–1 at the City Ground on 1 October 1966. The 3–0 win against Aston Villa on 15 April had Forest second in the table a point behind United. Injuries eventually took effect meaning Forest had to settle for being League Runners-up and losing in the 1966–67 FA Cup semi-final to Dave Mackay's Tottenham Hotspur. After missing out on both trophies, Hinton left in September of the following season. Hinton appeared 112 times for Forest scoring 24 goals.

His time with Forest also saw him earn two further England caps, in a 2–2 draw with Belgium – in which he scored – and a 2–1 win over Wales, both in 1964.

=== Derby County ===
He was then signed by Brian Clough for Derby County (local rivals of Forest) in September 1967 for £30,000. He spent eight seasons with the Rams, which coincided with the golden period in the club's history, winning promotion to the top flight as Second Division champions in 1968–69 and then winning the league championship in both 1971–72 and 1974–75. He departed in 1975 after 253 appearances and 63 goals for Derby. Whilst at Derby he was universally and affectionately known, amongst the fans by his nickname `Gladys` which stemmed from his aforementioned white boots and curly blonde perm, along with his elegant and non-aggressive playing style.

=== Later playing career ===
After a brief stint as player-manager of non-league Borrowash Victoria, he relocated to North America in 1976 after his son Matthew died from a rare form of cancer. Hinton first played for the Dallas Tornado for a season, before moving to the Vancouver Whitecaps to close out his playing career. In his final season before retiring aged 36 he set an NASL single-season record with 30 assists in 1978.

== Managerial career ==
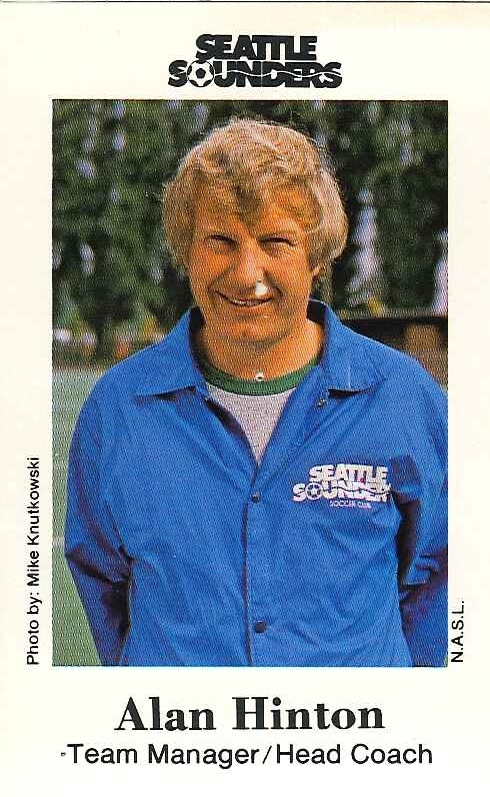
Alan Hinton with Seattle Sounders in 1980

Having settled in North America, Hinton managed only Canadian and American teams, his biggest successes were with the Seattle Sounders (66 games, 45 wins) and later on the Tacoma Stars (87 games, 69 wins).

Hinton also spent a number of years coaching youth soccer in the Puget Sound area of Washington state and became known as "Mr. Soccer" in the area. He coached the U13-18 Crossfire Sounders boys team (now the Crossfire Premier Soccer Club, including boys and girls teams) from 1992 to 1997.

Hinton was involved in efforts to bring the 1994 FIFA World Cup to the U.S., and when the Seattle Sounders name was revived for a new American Professional Soccer League club in 1994, Hinton became club president and appointed himself as coach.

== Personal life ==
After retiring from coaching, Hinton turned to a career in real estate, while remaining involved in youth soccer. He served as a local broadcast analyst for Seattle Sounders FC. His nephew, Craig, is also a professional footballer.

On 18 November 2014 Hinton tweeted that his bladder cancer had returned and that he would have major surgery on 7 January 2015. A few weeks later he tweeted that the pathology results showed him to be "clear".

On 1 June 2020, Hinton tweeted controversial remarks about black soccer players that led to Sounders FC officially ending a 40-year relationship with him.
