= David Nish =

English footballer

Personal information
- Full name: David John Nish
- Date of birth: 26 September 1947 (age 79)
- Place of birth: Burton upon Trent, England
- Height: 5 ft 11 in (1.80 m)
- Position: Defender

Youth career
- Measham Social Welfare

Senior career*
| Years | Team | Apps | (Gls) |
| 1966–1972 | Leicester City | 228 | (25) |
| 1972–1979 | Derby County | 188 | (10) |
| 1979 | Tulsa Roughnecks | 28 | (6) |
| 1980–1981 | Seattle Sounders | 57 | (4) |
| 1980–1981 | Seattle Sounders (indoor) | 5 | (6) |
| 1981–1982 | San Jose Earthquakes (indoor) | 16 | (1) |
| Total | | 522 | (52) |

International career
| 1969–1971 | England U23 | 10 | (1) |
| 1973–1974 | England | 5 | (0) |
- * Club domestic league appearances and goals

David John Nish (born 26 September 1947) is an English former professional footballer who played as a defender. Nish's £225,000 transfer from Leicester City to Derby County in 1972 broke the British transfer record.

== Club ==
Nish began his career with Leicester City in 1966. In 1972, Derby County paid a record transfer fee of £225,000 for his contract. At Derby he was part of the team that won the First Division in 1975.

In 1979, Nish moved to the United States where he joined the Tulsa Roughnecks of the North American Soccer League. In 1980, he moved to the Seattle Sounders where he played three seasons (two outdoor and one indoor). He finished his American career with one indoor season with the San Jose Earthquakes.

After leaving the U.S., he returned to Leicestershire where he turned out for non-league side Shepshed Charterhouse.

== International ==
Nish earned five caps for the England national team in 1973 and 1974.

Since retiring as a player in 1981, he has also worked with the academies of both Leicester and Derby.

== Honours ==
Leicester City

- FA Charity Shield: 1971
- FA Cup runner-up: 1968–69

Derby County

- Football League First Division: 1974–75
- FA Charity Shield: 1975
