= Roy McFarland =

English football player and manager (born 1948)

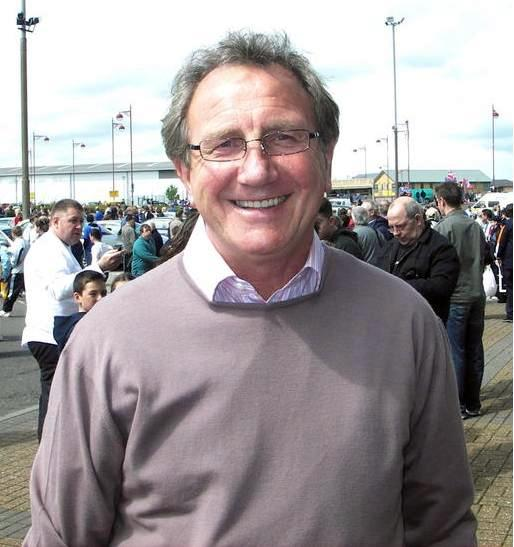

Personal information
- Full name: Roy Leslie McFarland
- Date of birth: 5 April 1948 (age 78)
- Place of birth: Liverpool, England
- Position: Central defender

Senior career*
Years	Team	Apps	(Gls)
1966–1967	Tranmere Rovers	35	(0)
1967–1981	Derby County	434	(44)
1981–1982	Bradford City	40	(1)
1983–1984	Derby County	8	(0)
Total		517	(45)

International career
1968–1970	England U23	5	(0)
1971–1976	England	28	(0)

Managerial career
- 1981–1982: Bradford City
- 1984: Derby County (caretaker)
- 1993–1995: Derby County
- 1995–1996: Bolton Wanderers (Co-manager)
- 1996–2001: Cambridge United
- 2001–2002: Torquay United
- 2003–2007: Chesterfield
- 2009: Burton Albion
- * Club domestic league appearances and goals

Roy Leslie McFarland (born 5 April 1948) is an English former football manager and player. With Derby County, he played 442 league games, helping him to earn 28 caps for England.

Born in Liverpool, McFarland developed his skills at Tranmere Rovers, before stints at Derby County and Bradford City. Under the management duo of Brian Clough and Peter Taylor, he was instrumental in Derby County's ascendancy to the First Division in 1969, subsequently leading them to league triumphs in 1972 and 1975, albeit his contribution was limited in the latter due to injury. Internationally, McFarland represented England, earning 28 caps and participating in notable matches, including a contentious encounter with Poland's Włodzimierz Lubański in 1973.

Transitioning to management, McFarland began as player-manager at Bradford City in 1981, guiding them to promotion from the Fourth Division. His managerial career spanned several clubs, including Derby County, Bolton Wanderers, Cambridge United, Torquay United, Chesterfield, and a caretaker role at Burton Albion, where he led them to Football League promotion. McFarland's influence extended beyond coaching, culminating in his appointment to the Derby County board of directors in 2017.

== Playing career ==
Born in Liverpool, McFarland was a player for Tranmere Rovers, Derby County and Bradford City. He represented England at full international level. Brian Clough and Peter Taylor signed him for Derby on 25 August 1967, three months after taking charge at Derby County, when they were rebuilding a side to gain promotion to the first division.

He was famous during the late 1960s and 1970s as a central defender in the Derby side which won promotion to the First Division in 1969 and followed this success with two league titles; the first under Clough in 1972 and the second under Dave Mackay in 1975, though injury meant he was only able to make four appearances during the latter campaign. He also won 28 caps for England.

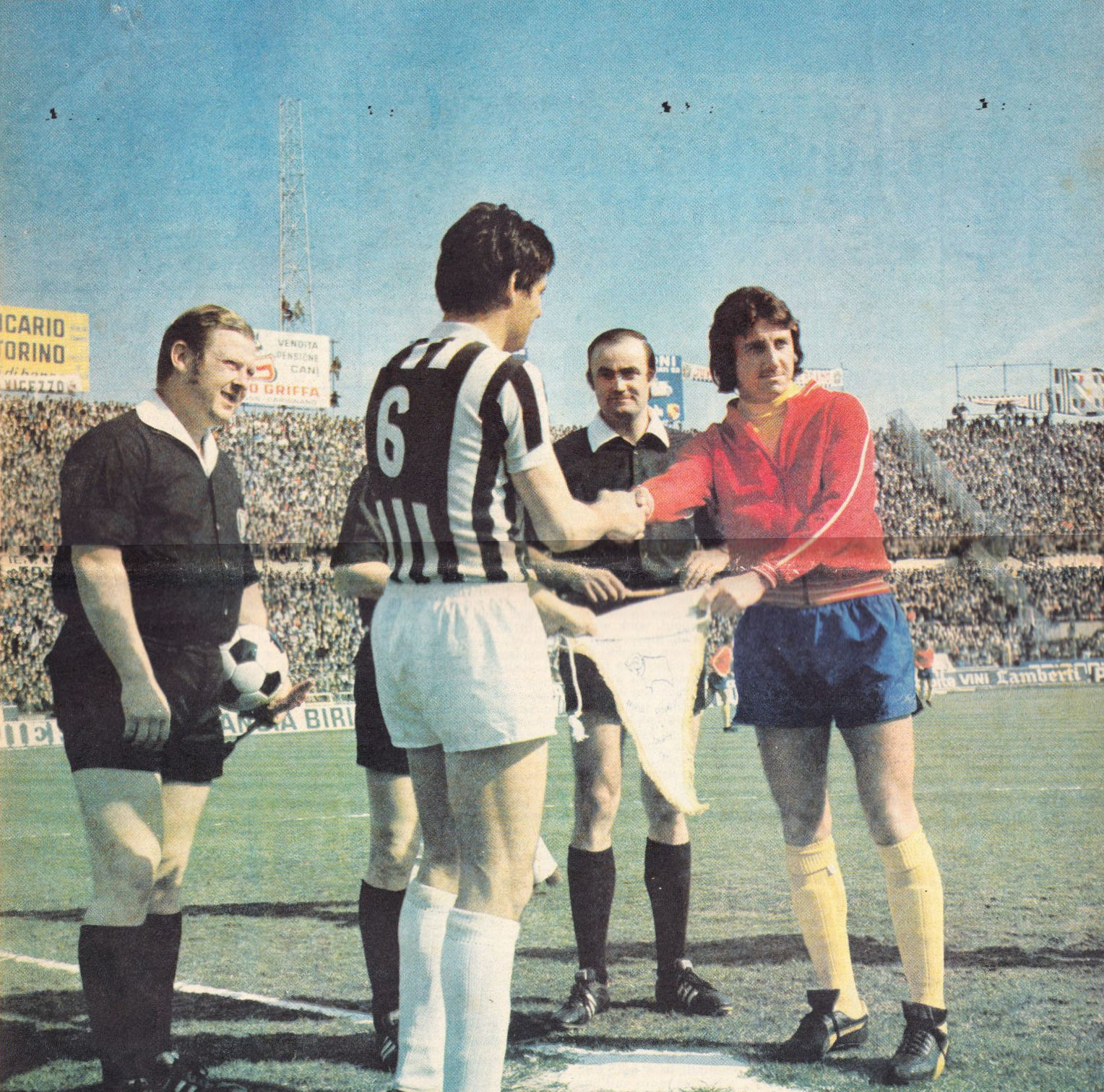
McFarland (right) captaining Derby County in 1973, here with Salvadore of Juventus before the semi-final round of the European Cup in Turin, Italy.

He is noted for having the earliest known booking for time wasting when he humorously kicked the ball out of play after Derby had taken the lead within 20 seconds against Liverpool in a game The Rams, who were on a downward spiral to relegation that season, were unlikely to win (they eventually lost 3-1).

McFarland had been deemed responsible for putting Włodzimierz Lubański, Poland's best striker at the time, out of football for two years after an apparent poor tackle damaged Lubański's cruciate ligament during a World Cup qualifying match in June 1973. Lubanski missed the 1974 FIFA World Cup where Poland captured third place, but recently Lubanski himself wrote in his memoirs published in Poland that his leg was injured without McFarland's involvement as a result of an earlier injury and resultant insufficient preparation for the big game.

== Managerial career ==
McFarland started his managerial career at Bradford City as player manager when he took over from George Mulhall in May 1981. He played 40 games for Bradford in a brief spell as manager which brought the club promotion in 1981–82 via the runners-up spot in the Fourth Division. The season included a nine-game winning run, which was a club record at the time. McFarland's reign was a launchpad for the club during the 1980s but he left in controversial circumstances with allegations former club Derby County had tapped up him and assistant Mick Jones. Derby eventually had to pay a large fine and compensation for taking the pair back to the Baseball Ground.

He became assistant manager at the club during Arthur Cox's reign as manager, and was promoted to the manager's seat when Cox quit in October 1993.

McFarland lasted two seasons as Derby manager, with significant amounts of money having been spent on the team. In his first season, they reached the Division One play-off final but lost 2–1 to Leicester City. They missed out on the playoffs a year later and McFarland moved to Bolton Wanderers.

Bolton had just been promoted to the Premier League under previous manager Bruce Rioch, and McFarland was unable to establish them at this level despite making several new signings. He was dismissed in January 1996 after just six months in charge, with Bolton bottom of the Premiership and heading for relegation.

McFarland's next management job came at Cambridge United, where he arrived just before Christmas in 1996. In his third season, 1998–99, they won promotion as Third Division runners-up. He remained in charge for two years before being replaced by John Beck in February 2001.

He took over as manager of Torquay United in July 2001, but resigned in April 2002 after Torquay chairman Mike Bateson decided that if McFarland was to have an assistant he had to have a playing one, meaning McFarland's assistant David Preece had to leave as he had just retired as a player.

From June 2003 to March 2007, McFarland was manager of Chesterfield and did well to keep the club in the third tier of the league, with Chesterfield's severe lack of resources, when most pundits have tipped them for relegation. He left the club after the poor set of results on 12 March 2007, leaving caretaker boss Lee Richardson to try to save the struggling Chesterfield.

In 2009, after a spell out of football McFarland was appointed the caretaker manager until the end of the 2008–09 season of Burton Albion on 6 January, filling the gap created by Nigel Clough who had moved along the A38 to McFarland's former club Derby County earlier in the day. His first game in charge ended in a 3–0 victory for Burton against Salisbury City in the FA Trophy second round; it was a victory which McFarland dedicated to his predecessor. McFarland eventually helped to extend Burton's unbeaten run to 17 games, which dated back to October 2008, before his side were beaten 2–0 by his former team Cambridge United in March 2009. McFarland managed the side to promotion to the Football League, after which he said he was interested in staying at the club for the 2009–10 season. He later turned down the opportunity to continue as manager, as he "did not want the full-time commitment of running a League Two club on a permanent basis." He was eventually succeeded by Paul Peschisolido.

McFarland was appointed to the Derby County board of directors in May 2017.

== Honours ==
=== Player ===
Derby County

- Football League First Division: 1971–72, 1974–75
- Football League Second Division promotion: 1968–69
- FA Charity Shield: 1975

Individual

- Rothmans Golden Boots Awards: 1972, 1973, 1974
- PFA Team of the Year: 1973–74 First Division, 1975–76 First Division, 1976–77 First Division

=== Manager ===
Bradford City

- Football League Fourth Division second-place promotion: 1981–82

Cambridge United

- Football League Third Division second-place promotion: 1998–99

Burton Albion

- Football Conference: 2008–09
