= Kevin Hector =

English footballer

Personal information
- Full name: Kevin James Hector
- Date of birth: 2 November 1944 (age 82)
- Place of birth: Leeds, England
- Height: 5 ft 8 in (1.73 m)
- Position: Striker

Senior career*
Years	Team	Apps	(Gls)
1962–1966	Bradford Park Avenue	176	(113)
1966–1978	Derby County	430	(147)
1978–1980	Vancouver Whitecaps	63	(39)
1978	→ Boston United (loan)	13	(4)
1979–1980	→ Burton Albion (loan)	11	(9)
1980–1982	Derby County	56	(8)
1982	Shepshed Charterhouse		
1982–1984	Gresley Rovers	38	(3)
1984–1985	Belper Town		
1985–1986	Eastwood Town		
1986–1987	Heanor Town		
Total		787	(323)

International career
1973	England	2	(0)
- * Club domestic league appearances and goals

Kevin James Hector (born 2 November 1944 in Leeds) is an English former footballer who scored 268 goals from 662 appearances in the Football League playing for Bradford Park Avenue and Derby County. His 486 League appearances for Derby County is a club record. He also played in the North American Soccer League for the Vancouver Whitecaps, and was capped twice for England.

== Career ==
Hector had a successful start to his playing career in the lower leagues at Bradford Park Avenue. In season 1965–66, he scored 44 league goals in a single 46-game league season plus 6 goals in the first 4 league games of the following season prior to his transfer to Derby.

Tim Ward signed him for Derby County in 1966 and he was a key player in their success under the management of Brian Clough and Dave Mackay over the next few seasons, forming a formidable partnership with John O'Hare. Hector played for the Rams for a total of 12 years, during which time they won the Football League First Division championship twice (the first time in 1972 under Clough and the second time in 1975 under Mackay) and the Football League Second Division championship (in 1969), and reached the semi-finals of the European Cup, the FA Cup and the League Cup.

He left Derby for Vancouver Whitecaps and scored 15 goals for the Canadian outfit as they won the 1979 NASL title. After his time in North America he rejoined Derby in the early 1980s. He made a record 589 appearances for Derby in his two spells, 486 of which came in league games.

Hector played twice for England, his debut coming as an 88th-minute substitute in the fateful World Cup qualifier against Poland at Wembley in October 1973, when England, needing victory to qualify, were held to a 1–1 draw. With his first touch of the ball, he nearly won the game for England as his header from a corner was cleared off the line.
