= History of Derby County F.C. (1967–present) =

The history of Derby County Football Club from 1967 to the present covers the major events in the history of the club from Brian Clough assuming control in 1967 up until the 2022–23 season.

Whilst the first 80 years of Derby County F.C.'s existence had been relatively consistent, the era covered here saw the club experience five promotions and five relegations as it rose dramatically to its peak and back. After over a decade in the second tier of English football, Brian Clough took charge at Derby and kickstarted a revolution at the club; it went on to win the Football League First Division twice in the 1970s and reach the European Cup semi finals in 1973 before rapidly declining back to the third tier and near financial meltdown within ten years of its second Championship. A rise back to the top followed towards the end of the 1980s and start of the 1990s before a spell of flitting between top flight and second-tier football followed over the next 20 years.

During this period the club was managed by its greatest ever manager, Brian Clough, and was represented by players such as Kevin Hector, Roy McFarland, Archie Gemmill, Stefano Eranio and Igor Štimac, all of whom where voted into the club's All Time First Eleven in 2010.

== The Clough and Taylor years (1967–1973) ==
=== Promotion and consolidation ===
Clough and Taylor had guided Hartlepools to an eighth-placed finish in Division Four during the 1966–67 season and was recommended to Derby chairman Sam Longson by former England striker Len Shackleton, who had been working as a journalist in the North East. The duo's first season in charge of Derby saw the club finish one place lower, 18th, than the previous campaign but it saw the recruitment of numerous players, such Roy McFarland, John O'Hare and Alan Hinton, who between them made 1,154 appearances for the club and would go on to form the spine of the club's most successful ever side. Of the inherited squad, eleven players departed and only four were retained: Kevin Hector, Alan Durban, Ron Webster and Colin Boulton. Clough also fired the club secretary, the groundsman and the chief scout, along with two tea ladies he caught laughing after a defeat. The season was notable for a run to the League Cup semi finals, the club's first ever notable run in the competition, where they lost 4–2 on aggregate to eventual winners Leeds United. The campaign also saw Reg Matthews set the club record of 246 appearances by a goalkeeper, as he surpassed Harry Maskrey's previous record of 222.

With the addition of Willie Carlin and the 'inspirational' capture of Tottenham Hotspur's Dave Mackay, whom Clough converted from his famed midfield role into a commanding centre half, Clough's restructuring of Derby County was complete and the embarked on a successful promotion campaign the following season (1968–69), winning the Football League Second Division title at a canter, seven points clear of second-placed Crystal Palace, and equalling the club record 63 points in a season (2 points for a win). The season itself started in unconvincing fashion with two draws and two defeats. Carlin, brought from Sheffield United for £60,000 as the final piece of Clough's jigsaw, made his debut in the fifth game of the season, a 2–2 home draw with Hull City and from there the club lost just three of its remaining 37 fixtures, including winning the final 9, a club record. A 3–2 win at Blackpool on 8 March 1969 kicked started an unbeaten sequence which did not end for 22 matches and the following season with a 1–0 defeat away to Sheffield Wednesday on 27 September 1969, another club record and the final tally of just 5 defeats from 42 league fixtures was also unmatched in the club's history. The club also had another notable League Cup run, reaching the quarter-finals and beating top-flight Everton and Chelsea in successive rounds, before again being knocked out by the competition's eventual winners, falling 1–0 away to Swindon Town in a replay. Promotion saw Derby return to the top flight for the first time in 16 years and Dave Mackay's performances saw him named Football Writers' Association Footballer of the Year, alongside Manchester City's Tony Book, the only Derby County player to earn the honour.

1970 Watney Cup Final
- Event: 1970 Watney Cup Final
Derby County	Manchester United F.C.
4	1
- Date: 8 August 1970
- Venue: The Baseball Ground, Derby
- Attendance: 32,049

Clough's team entered the 1969–70 Division One campaign more than ready for the challenge of top-flight football and went 11 unbeaten from the opening day, briefly topping the table. A club record 41,826 packed into The Baseball Ground to see a 5–0 victory over Tottenham Hotspur, before an indifferent run of form between September and January saw the club fall of the title pace. The recruitment of Terry Hennessey, Derby's first £100,000 player, from Nottingham Forest in February restored some impetus in the side and the club rallied, finishing the season 11 unbeaten, including a sequence of 6 consecutive wins, and earning a fourth placed finish, which would have claimed the club its first ever European campaign as entrants in the Inter-Cities Fairs Cup but a joint FA and League disciplinary panel found the club guilty of 'gross negligence' after an unexplained gap of £3,000 in season-ticket income and payment of fees to Dave Mackay outside of the terms of his contract. The fine of £10,000 and a one-year ban from European competition saw the club appoint Preston North End assistant secretary Stuart Webb as their new secretary to ensure that the administrative efficiency off the pitch matched the playing efficiency on it.

Derby opened the 1970–71 season with a pre-season participation in the inaugural Watney Cup, an invitational tournament in which the top two scorers from all divisions of the Football League who had not earned promotion or European football, took part. As an invitational, the player's participation in the competition is not officially recorded in the club's records but the tournament did give Derby their first cup win since 1946, with a 4–1 win over Manchester United in the final at The Baseball Ground. This was Derby's sole participation in the tournament, which lasted only four seasons, but the victory proved to be the highlight of an otherwise unremarkable season as Derby consolidated their top-flight position with a ninth-placed finish, though Roy McFarland became the first Derby player to represent England since 1950 when he appeared against Malta, and Clough made two more key signings in the shape of Archie Gemmill, £66,000 from Preston, and again broke the club transfer record with the £170,000 capture of Sunderland's Colin Todd. Dave Mackay ended his three-year tenure at the club with his first ever ever-present campaign, a personal goal, and won the club's Player of the Year award.

=== 1971–72: Champions of England ===
Described as Derby's "greatest ever season", the 1971–72 season saw Derby County's first team claim their first ever League title as well as win the Texaco Cup and the reserves win The Central League for the first time since 1936. The season started in encouraging fashion, with a 12 match unbeaten run, though 7 of these were draws, only coming to an end 1–0 defeat away to Manchester United. Following a 3–0 capitulation away to title rivals Leeds United following an inconsistent period of form which saw 5 wins and 6 defeats from 11 fixtures, Clough savaged his squad and produced the desired effect – Derby lost just 3 of their remaining 19 fixtures and did enough to hold off both Leeds United and Liverpool to claim the title. A crucial Easter victory over Leeds United, 2–0 with goals from John O'Hare and a Norman Hunter own goal, was vital but a defeat by Manchester City in City's last and Derby's penultimate match of the campaign left the title race wide open between Derby, Liverpool and Leeds.

Derby County First XI: 1971–72

Derby ended the season with a 1–0 win over title rivals Liverpool at the Baseball Ground, John McGovern netting the crucial winner, leaving Derby on 58 from 42 games, Leeds on 57 from 41 and Liverpool on 56 from 41. Derby's destiny was not in their own hands and they left the country to escape the pressure; Clough holidayed with his family in the Isles of Scilly whilst Taylor went to Majorca with the players. Fixture congestion meant that Leeds and Liverpool both played their final matches of their season after the 1972 FA Cup Final, in which Leeds had beaten Arsenal, with Leeds needing a draw and Liverpool a win to overtake Derby. In the event of the fixtures, a tigerish Wolverhampton Wanderers overcame Leeds 2–1 at Molineux and Liverpool could only record a 0–0 draw at Highbury against Arsenal. The league was unusually close throughout the campaign and the final table saw Champions Derby just one point of the teams in 2nd (Leeds), 3rd (Liverpool) and 4th (Manchester City). Clough had built a balanced team at Derby, one in which every player knew his job. Although they rarely swept away the opposition, instead building on the foundations of a strong defence as record signing defender Colin Todd claimed the club's Player of the Year, there were some memorable performances; 4–0 humblings of rivals Nottingham Forest and Stoke City at the Baseball Ground and away to Sheffield United. Alan Hinton finished the season as the club's top scorer with 15 goals, whilst Kevin Hector netted his 100th for the club in a 6–0 FA Cup Fourth round win over Notts County and Alan Durban became the club's most capped international, overtaking Sammy Crooks, with his 27th and final appearance for Wales. Steve Powell also became Derby's youngest ever player, a record he held for almost 30 years, when he made his debut in a Texaco Cup tie against Stoke City aged just 16 years and 30 days.

Although Derby reached the FA Cup quarter-finals (losing 1–0 to eventual runners-up Arsenal in a second replay at Filbert Street, Leicester), their primary cup success for 1971–72 came in the Texaco Cup, a competition between English, Scottish and Irish clubs who were not in European competition and featuring 16 clubs. With Derby's home gates always over 20,000 they overcame Dundee United (8–5 on aggregate), Stoke City (4–3) and Newcastle United (4–2) before playing Airdrieonians in the final. After a 0–0 draw at Broomfield Park, Derby overcame their Scottish opponents 2–1 at the Baseball Ground, with Roger Davies, signed for £12,000 the previous summer from non-league Worcester City and who scored many a crucial goal in the successful reserve team, grabbing the winner in a 2–1 victory to give Derby their second cup win in as many season.

=== Europe and Clough's departure ===
European debut proved to be a memorable one. When the European Cup was launched in 1955, Derby had been in the Third Division and now in the 1972–73 season stood as English football's sole representatives in Europe's premiere club competition. Derby's first ever European match came with a home tie against Yugoslavia's Željezničar Sarajevo, which they won 2–0 with goals from Roy McFarland and Archie Gemmil. After a 2–1 win in Yugoslavia saw Derby proceed through to the second round 4–1 on aggregate, the club found itself drawn again Eusébio's Benfica, one of European football's leading lights. In one of the greatest nights in the club's history, Derby swept aside Benfica 3–0 in front of 38,100 fans and then held their nerve in the return leg to record a 0–0 draw at the Estádio da Luz in front of 75,000 (becoming only the second club in European football history, after Ajax, to keep a clean sheet against Benfica over two legs) to win 3–0 on aggregate and advance to the quarter-finals. After defeating Czechoslovakia's Spartak Trnava 2–1 over two legs, the Rams met Italian giants Juventus: at the end of the 3–1 defeat in Turin, Clough accused the rivals to have bribed the match officials — and called the Italians "cheating bastards" —, despite the Bianconeri will prove later unrelated to any attempt to combine. Derby's European adventure came at the expense of their league campaign, with a run of just 3 wins in 11 towards the end of the season contributing to a disappointing seventh-placed finish in the club's first ever title defence, as they finished the 1972–73 First Division, 14 points behind eventual winners Liverpool. One memorable match came in the club's run to the FA Cup quarter finals, in a fourth round FA Cup tie against Tottenham Hotspur. After a 1–1 draw at The Baseball Ground, Derby found themselves 3–1 down with 10 minutes to go in the replay at White Hart Lane, before Roger Davies grabbed a brace to take the game to extra time, before completing his hat-trick as Derby ran out 5–3 winners. Kevin Hector, who grabbed a brace in the match, became only the 7th Derby player to score 100 league goals when he hit the second in a 2–0 win over Coventry City in April 1973 and Derby broke the British Transfer Record for the first time in 24 years with the £250,000 capture of Leicester City's David Nish in August 1972.

Without the distraction of European football removed, hopes where high that Derby would enter the 1973–74 season as title contenders, but the increasingly fractious relationship between Clough and the board came to a head following a 1–0 victory over Manchester United at Old Trafford on 13 October 1973. The club were 3rd in the table at the time. Two days later, Clough and Taylor resigned their positions as Derby County manager. Clough and Taylor had briefly resigned 18 months previously on 27 April 1972, to take over at Coventry City before Longson offered them more money, and Clough's burgeoning media personality went at odds with what Longson wanted from his manager. Following the game at Old Trafford a director called Jack Kirkland demanded to know what Taylor's role within the club and the pair, feeling undermined, left their role after six and a half years in charge.

The move was received with widespread uproar from the Derby support, with the formation of a protest group, the holding of public meetings and even the backing of respected local M.P. Phillip Whitehead. However, neither the club nor Clough would back down and, after being turned down by Ipswich Town boss Bobby Robson, the club approached former player Dave Mackay, then Nottingham Forest manager, who took over at the end of October 1973.

Having to contend with a discontented dressing room, who had nothing against Mackay but simply wanted Clough reinstated, and an indifferent start to his Derby management career seeing the side go winless until a December win at Newcastle united, and leave the League Cup at the first hurdle with a 3–0 mauling at the hands of lower league Sunderland, Mackay was initially under pressure. However, the signing of Swindon Town's Rod Thomas and Aston Villa's Bruce Rioch turned the club's season around and they lost only four of their last 18 fixtures to grab a third place finish and a return to European football; a fine achievement considering the tumultuous nature of the campaign.

== Champions again (1974–1975) ==

Derby County First XI: 1974–75

Whereas Clough built his Championship winning team on discipline and a solid defence, Mackay's 1974–1975 side relied on its attacking power to overwhelm its opponents. With the goals of front three Kevin Hector, Francis Lee (a £100,000 capture from Manchester City in August 1974), and Roger Davies, all of whom hit 12 or more league goals, supplemented by midfielder Bruce Rioch, whose 15 strikes lead him to finish the club's top league scorer for that season. Derby hit Q.P.R. and Burnley 5–2 and Luton Town 5–0 (with Davies becoming the first Derby player to hit 5 goals in a match since Hughie Gallacher in 1934) to finish the season as the league's leading scorers. Such abandon often left the side defensively frail however, and there were heavy defeats along the way including a 3–0 defeats to Ipswich Town and Carlisle United, who finished the season bottom, and 4–1 to Q.P.R.

The season started in worrying fashion, with just one win in the club's opening seven fixtures, and despite a brief rally of 6 wins in 10 over September to November, a 0–1 defeat at Luton Town on 21 December 1974 left the idea of a title charge as the last things on the club's mind. However, a run of just 3 defeats in their last 20 games, which saw the club take 30 points from a possible 40, helped urge Derby up the title and the title was sealed after a 0–0 draw away to Leicester combined with Ipswich Town drawing at Manchester City, confirmed Derby as champions for the second time in four years. Peter Daniel, who stepped in for Roy McFarland who suffered an Achilles Tendon injury whilst on international duty and missed all but the last four matches, warned the club's Player of the Season award and Ron Webster became only the fifth player to break 500 appearances for Derby during his appearance in the defeat at Luton, whilst Boulton broke the record for goalkeeping appearances during the campaign, on his way to 344 appearances total for the club. Colin Todd was awarded the PFA Players' Player of the Year award for the 1974–75 season, the only Derby County player to do so.

Although domestic cup progress was limited (only reaching the third round of the League Cup and the fifth round of the FA Cup), Derby's UEFA Cup debut proved relatively fruitful. A 6–2 aggregate victory over Switzerland's Servette FC was followed by a 4–4 aggregate draw with Spain's Atlético Madrid in the Second Round, both ties finishing 2–2. as a result, Derby took part in the club's first ever penalty shootout and overcame their opponents, winning 7–6. However, that was to be as good as it got for The Rams as Yugoslavian Velež Mostar were able to overturn a 3–1 first league deficit to win 5–4 on aggregate and reach the quarter-finals.

== Missing out on the Double and a dramatic decline (1975–1984) ==
1975 FA Charity Shield
- Event: FA Charity Shield
Derby County	West Ham United
2	0
- Date: 9 August 1975
- Venue: Wembley Stadium, London
- Referee: Gordon Kew
- Attendance: 59,000

To maintain the momentum of winning the Championship, Mackay added more firepower to his side with the £100,000 capture of Charlie George from Arsenal. George made his competitive debut in the 1975 FA Charity Shield at Wembley Stadium as Derby overcame FA Cup winners West Ham United 2–0 under the Twin Towers to claim the shield for the only time in their history. George had a brilliant season for the Rams, earning both the club's Player of the Year trophy and the Midlands Player of the Season trophy and helped himself to 24 goals in all competitions. His most memorable strikes, and arguably the greatest single 90 minutes in Derby County's history, came in the 2nd round of the European Cup where, on 22 October 1975, Derby hit 4 goals past Read Madrid, George claiming a hat-trick, in a 4–1 victory at The Baseball Ground. George grabbed another goal in the return leg at the Santiago Bernabéu Stadium but Derby conceded 5 and crashed out 5–6 on aggregate.

Despite this disappointment, the club maintained a healthy tilt at the league title and were well in the race until March, when George dislocated his shoulder in a 1–1 draw at home to Stoke City saw the striker miss the run-in, with Derby taking just 6 points from the remaining 14 and finishing the season in fourth, 7 points behind winners Liverpool. Prior to this blow, the club was on a run of just 1 defeat in 11 and where scoring goals for fun – the return of 75 goals was the club's highest in a top-flight campaign since the 1930s, with Bruce Rioch, Charlie George and Francis Lee all reaching double figures.

The club had also reached the FA Cup semi finals for the first time since winning the competition in 1946, but without the inspiration of George they crashed 2–0 against Manchester United at Hillsborough and any talk of "The Double", not a fanciful notion given the club's form, disappeared. Although the season ended with a 6–2 victory over Ipswich Town at Portman Road, with Francis Lee grabbing 2 goals in the final game of his career, unbeknown to Derby County and its fans, the club's peak was passing.

Mackay's record of a League title and two top five finishes, as well as an FA Cup semi-final, in just two-and-a-half years should have made him fireproof but an alarming start to the 1976–77 season, which saw the club fail to win a league match until the 9th fixture, when they thumped Tottenham Hotspur 8–2 with Bruce Rioch grabbing four in his emergency centre forward role, had Mackay's position coming under threat. During this period the Rams did secure their biggest ever victory, with a 12–0 home demolition of Finn Harps on 15 September 1976, with Kevin Hector grabbing 5 and Leighton James, a club record £310,000 capture from Burnley, and Charlie George each grabbing hat-tricks (Rioch scored the other). The second leg was won 4–1 for a 16–1 aggregate victory, but the club exited Europe at the second stage for the second consecutive season, crashing out 5–2 on aggregate to Greek side AEK Athens, with a 3–2 home defeat the club's first ever home defeat in European competition. Following the AEK Athens defeat, a 1–1 draw away to Q.P.R. and a 0–2 defeat away to Everton, Mackay approached the board with a request for a vote of confidence. When this was not granted, Mackay's position became essentially untenable and he was sacked on 25 November 1976. As with Clough, Mackay lasted just 18 months at Derby after winning the title.

Mackay's departure triggered a revolving managerial door at Derby over the next 8 years. His immediate replacement was reserve team manager Colin Murphy as Derby, unsuccessful, mounted an attempt to bring Brian Clough, now at Nottingham Forest, back to the club. Murphy managed just 7 victories in his 35 games in charge of Derby, whilst adding £300,000 Derek Hales and £175,000 Gerry Daly to the team and oversaw a finish of just 15th, the club's lowest since they had returned to the top flight. During the season Roy McFarland overtook Alan Durban to become Derby's most capped player, earning his 28th cap in Rome against Italy, and Ron Webster broke Steve Bloomer's 60-year-old appearance record with his 526th appearance for Derby in a 1–1 draw with Sunderland in April 1977.

Murphy lasted just 6 games into the 1977–78 season before being replaced by former Manchester United manager Tommy Docherty. Docherty was constantly engaged in the transfer market whilst at Derby, but the only truly successful capture was Steve Buckley, a £163,000 signing from Luton Town who was Derbys first choice leftback for the next 8 years. In his two years in charge at Derby, Docherty could only oversee 12th placed and 19th placed finishes. During his spell, the backbone of Derby's glory era departed, as Colin Boulton, Colin Todd, Archie Gemmill, Kevin Hector Charlie George and Leighton James either retired or were sold and on and not adequately replaced, with Docherty's "three Van Goghs" midfield trio of Bruce Rioch, Gerry Daly and Don Masson flopped in particular. Docherty was unpopular amongst fans now used to success and it was with a sense of relief when he resigned in May 1979 to take over at Q.P.R.

For all his faults, however, Docherty had kept an increasingly ailing Derby County side in the top flight and this proved impossible for Colin Addison the following season. Addison spent heavily in his attempt to preserve Derby's top-flight status, with £1m spent on Barry Powell, Alan Biley and Dave Swindlehurst, with Swindlehurst being the club's first £400,000 player. Against a background of turmoil, with various changes of chairman and a police investigation into alleged boardroom corruption during the summer of 1979, Derby could only record a finish of 21st out of 22 teams, 5 points from safety and exited the top flight after 11 years and 2 titles with a whimper.

Derby's first second tier fixture for 11 years saw them crash 3–0 at Cambridge United but 4 wins in their next 5 matches boded well. Roy McFarland became the seventh, and most recent, player to reach 500 Derby County appearances when he appeared in a 3–1 home win over Sheffield Wednesday on 4 October 1980 and Kevin Hector was brought back from his spell at Vancouver Whitecaps the same month. Although shorn of the star names of the previous decade, Derby had the ever consistent Steve Buckley in the ranks, alongside a striking combination of Alan Biley and Dave Swindlehurst, who both broke double figures for the season, as well as the experience of McFarland and Steve Powell. However, despite a promising middle part of the season, the club fell away badly in the final third and recorded just 4 wins from its last 15 fixtures to finish the season in 6th, 22 points behind Champions West Ham United. The season also saw Roy McFarland released by the club after 13 years and he left to become Player-manager at Bradford City.

Derby entered the 1981–82 season expecting promotion, but just 6 wins from their opening 20 games put paid to any ambitions and Colin Addison was sacked in January 1982, to be replaced by his assistant John Newman. Newman managed just 5 wins during the remainder of the campaign as Derby finished a lowly 16th and where only saved from relegation by the return of the mercurial Charlie George on non-contract terms from Bournemouth. Other late signings, such as John Barton and John McAlle were also vital, and an ageing Kevin Hector was still contributing to the cause; he grabbed his 200th Derby goal in a 2–3 League Cup 2nd round defeat by West Ham and made his final appearance for the club, his 589th (a club record), in a 3–2 victory over Watford on the final day of the season at the Baseball Ground and notched his 201st and final goal for the club with the opener, only Steve Bloomer having more goals for the club,. Despite successfully staving off relegation Newman always knew his position at Derby was under siege and, with yet another change of chairman, Snooker impresario Mike Watterson replacing Richard Moore, Newman was dismissed 13 games into the 1982–83 season, with just one win to his credit, to be replaced by Peter Taylor.

Since Taylor had left the club 9 years previously he had won two European Cups and the League with Nottingham Forest, before retiring. In becoming Derby's third manager of 1982 Taylor created friction with former partner Brian Clough, from which the pair's friendship never recovered. Taylor brought McFarland back to the club as his assistant manager, earning the club a fine when Bradford City complained of an illegal approach, and brought back Archie Gemmill to provide leadership, but the key signing was Halifax Town forward Bobby Davison for £80,000. Although Taylor had an indifferent start to his career, a run of 15 unbeaten between 22 January 1983 and 30 April 1983 kept Derby up once more, and guided them to a 13th-place finish. They even overcame bitter rivals Nottingham Forest, recent Champions of Europe at the time 2–0 at The Baseball Ground in a fractious FA Cup third-round tie before being knocked out in the 5th round 1–0 against Manchester United.

With the team of Taylor and McFarland leading the team to an impressive second half of the season, hopes were raised for the 1983–84 campaign. In reality though, the campaign was disastrous as years of financial mismanagement caught up with Derby and both the Inland Revenue and Customs and Excise issued winding up petitions on the club. The true extent of the club's financial woes were born out when they could not afford to pay Telford United their share of the gate receipts after and FA Cup 4th round tie (the club eventually reached the quarter finals, their best run for seven years) and Stuart Webb was appointed a director and set about acquiring shares and striving to attract investors to the club and cottoned onto media proprietor Robert Maxwell, who was owner of Oxford United. Maxwell, who appeared to have vast wealth at his disposal, helped the directors raise the £220,000 necessary to lift the petitions and Derby survived off the pitch. On the pitch however, things fell to a new low. With Derby clear in the high court, Taylor was fired as manager following a 5–1 defeat at Barnsley, with the club having won just 31 points from 33 games, and McFarland was appointed until the end of the season. Although the club rallied under McFarland, securing 4 wins and a draw from these final nine fixtures, they were relegated to the now-national Third Division in 1984, their centenary year, in 20th place, 5 points from safety.

== Consecutive promotions and Top Flight return (1984–1991) ==
Having just clinched promotion to Division One with an exciting Newcastle United side, Arthur Cox left St James' Park on a point of contract and Derby wasted no time in appointing him as manager in May 1984. He was the club's 9th manager in less than 11 years, a damning statistic, but Cox was a huge success at Derby and became their longest serving manager since George Jobey, with Roy McFarland stepping back into the position of Assistant Manager.

Whilst Derby were now under the control of the Maxwell family, with Ian as chairman whilst Robert remained in charge at Oxford United, Cox entered a club finally run with backroom stability if not exactly limitless funds. The 1984–85 season was one of transition and, although the club only managed a 7th-placed finish – the lowest league placing in the club's history – the foundations for the next five years of success were being laid, with Rob Hindmarch, Charlie Palmer and Eric Steele were bought in for free whilst the sale of Kevin Wilson for £150,000 to Ipswich Town helped fund moves for Trevor Christie, Gary Micklewhite and Geraint Williams. Of the players at the club when Cox arrive, the key man was Peter Taylor signing Bobby Davison, who became the first Derby player to hit 20 league goals in a single campaign since Kevin Hector in 1967–68 when he hit 24 goals in 46 matches to finish as the club's leading scorer for the third consecutive season.

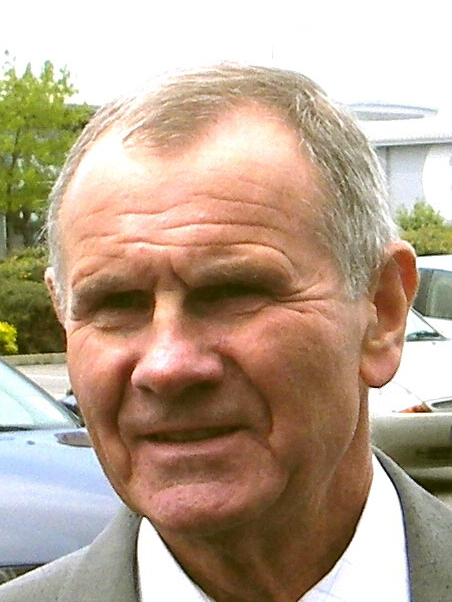
Arthur Cox

The following season Davison was again top scorer and, alongside new signings such as Jeff Chandler, Ross McLaren and future-England manager Steve McClaren and John Gregory, helped the club earn promotion for the third tier at the second attempt, setting the club record of 84 points in a season from 3 points for a win, as they finished third in the 1985–86 Third Division, recording some big wins along the way; a 7–0 win over Lincoln City was the club's biggest league win since before World War I. With a 46-game league programme, a run to the FA Cup fifth round, which included a 6–1 win over Telford United, the League Cup 3rd round and participation in the Associate Members' Cup's Southern Qualifying Group, Derby played 60 competitive matches between 17 August 1985 and 12 May 1986, a club record, with Steve Buckley, Ross McLaren and Gary Micklewhite taking part in 58 games each. A buoyant feeling had returned to The Baseball Ground, and Cox was in his pomp, shaping a tightly knit group of players who each knew their jobs and respected each other which was supplemented with considered signings such as Phil Gee from Gresley Rovers and Nigel Callaghan from Watford. Following promotion the club won the 1986–87 Second Division at a canter, 6 points ahead of second placed Portsmouth and equalled the previous season's record of 84 points, though this was taken from 42 rather than 46 fixtures. After an opening day home defeat by Oldham Athletic the club went unbeaten at The Baseball Ground in the league for the rest of the season. Bobby Davison (who finished top league scorer for the fifth season on a row, with 19 strikes, taking his league tally to 82 in 5 years) and Phil Gee grabbed 32 goals between them, half of Derby's total, and Cox's team set a club record with 11 away league victories to secure a return to top-flight football after a traumatic seven years away.

Derby's upturn in form had also sparked an upturn in attendances, which had fallen dramatically during the late 1970s and early 1980s.

With Derby back in the top flight, Robert Maxwell took over from his son as chairman, who took the position of vice-chairman, and showed a clear desire to make his mark, with two England internationals being brought into the club in the guise of new club record signing Mark Wright, at a cost of £760,000, and Peter Shilton from Southampton. Both played a key role as the club fought hard to secure a 15th-placed finish, eight points clear of relegation, although an eight-match mid-season losing run prevented them from finishing higher. Using safety as a momentum, Cox infused some extra class into the squad with Newcastle United's Paul Goddard and Oxford United's Trevor Hebberd. Hebberd's Oxford teammate Dean Saunders joined the club in October 1988 as Derby's first £1million signing, the club reached the dizzy heights of 5th in the 1988–89 Division One table. This was Cox's team at its peak and, as Peter Shilton put it, it was a "battling fifth" and further investment was required if Derby were to maintain the surge back to their peak. Maxwell, however, was drawing away from the club; critical of attendances (The Baseball Ground as this point could hold only 25,000 spectators and only broke 20,000 on three occasions) and at war with the football league as they blocked his attempts to add Watford to his portfolio of clubs and lent money to Tottenham Hotspur.

He eventually put the club up for sale in September 1990, putting it into limbo as it was unable to buy players or even bring any in on loan. Form declined badly and key players departed – Paul Goddard was sold to Millwall for £800,000 – whilst injuries bit into a squad increasingly short of depth. Although there were two Derby players, Mark Wright and Peter Shilton (who became Derby's most capped player that campaign) in the England team that reached the 1990 World Cup semi-finals the club could only manage a 16th-place finish in 1989–90 and endured an even worse campaign the following year. Between December 1990 and April 1991 the club went a club record 20 games without a win and equalled the worst ever home league defeat when they crashed 7–1 at home to Liverpool. Gates dropped to just over 11,000 from an opening match crowd of 18,011 against Sheffield United and the team looked a shadow of the one that had finished fifth two years before as they were relegated in bottom place with just 5 wins and 24 points from 38 games, a massive 13 points from safety.

== Big spending playoff contenders (1991–1995) ==
Despite such struggles Saunders had managed an impressive 17 goals, almost half of Derby's 37 total, and it was no surprise that the club failed to hold on to him as he was sold to Liverpool for £2.9m (over £2m more than the previous record fee received for a Derby player), along with Mark Wright, who commanded a £2.3m. Much of the cash from this £5.2m windfall went into paying off Robert Maxwell. Maxwell was replaced first by Brian Fearn and then by Lionel Pickering, who made his fortune through the founding and running of a free newspaper, and brought majority shareholdings and invested £12m in the form of a loan. Derby went from being financially stricken to one of the richest clubs outside the top flight. Derby twice broke its transfer record in the space of a month when in March 1992 they signed Paul Kitson for £1.3m from Leicester City (Phil Gee being one of two players going in the opposite direction) and then Tommy Johnson for Notts County ten days later. Paul Simpson also came in from big money (£800k from Oxford United) as did Marco Gabbiadini (£1.3m from Sunderland) and even Bobby Davison (who had left for Leeds United three years earlier), returned for a spell on loan and reached a century of goals for Derby, only the 7th player and most recent to do so, when he netted in a 2–2 draw with Newcastle United. Despite such attacking prowess, and the setting of a new club record for 12 away wins in a season, Derby could only finish 3rd in the 1991–92 Second Division and missed out on automatic promotion by 2 points. As a result, Derby entered the Football League playoffs for the first time since they had been introduced in 1987. Facing off against fellow big spenders Blackburn Rovers, Derby fell at the semi-final stage as a 2–1 win at The Baseball Ground wasn't enough to overcome a 4–2 defeat at Ewood Park in the first leg and they crashed out 4–5 on aggregate and missed out on the opportunity to be a part of the inaugural Premier League, instead spending the 1992–93 season in the renamed Division One.

Despite the addition of Craig Short for £2.5m from Notts County – a record for a team outside of the top flight and for a defender at any level – the club could only an 8th-placed finish in the 1992–93 Division One table, largely as a result of taking three points from their opening 7 fixtures, missing out on the playoffs altogether. Whilst the club did manage a trip to Wembley for the first time in nearly 20 years – reaching the final of the Anglo-Italian Cup, where they lost 1–3 to Cremonese – and recorded a club record 7 consecutive away league wins, starting with a 3–1 win at Cambridge United on 3 October 1992 and ending with a 2–1 defeat at Brentford on Boxing Day, 1992, the season was seen as something of a disappointment considering the amount of money spent and the players available to the club.

1994 Football League Division One play-off Final
Leicester City	Derby County
2	1
- Date: 30 May 1994
- Venue: Wembley Stadium, London
- Attendance: 73,671

The Anglo Italian cup run, coupled with extended interest in the Coca-Cola Cup (where they took Arsenal to a third round replay) and reaching the FA Cup quarter-finals for the first time in 9 years, taking Sheffield Wednesday to a replay after a 3–3 draw at The Baseball Ground meant the cup took part in 64 matches between 15 August 1992 and 8 May 1993, a new club record with Paul Kitson taking part in 61 of them and finishing the season as leading scorer, with 24 goals in all competitions. Arthur Cox retired in October of the 1993–94 season, citing severe back problems, leaving the role after 9 years in charge.

He was replaced by his assistant Roy McFarland (who became the only man to manage the club permanently in two separate spells) who steered the club's to a second playoff campaign. After overcoming Millwall 5–1 on aggregate in the semifinal legs, and surviving a pitch invasion in the 3–1 win at the New Den, Derby came up against local rivals Leicester City at Wembley. Despite taking the lead through Tommy Johnson, Derby lost 2–1 after a double from Steve Walsh and missed out on promotion yet again. Derby had built a side which seemed to be consistently achieving less than the sum of its parts, with Gary Charles, a former England international, Craig Short, Paul Williams, Mark Pembridge, Paul Kitson and Tommy Johnson all keen to test themselves at a higher level. Several of these players left during the 1994–95 season, Kitson joining Newcastle United for £2.25m, Charles and Johnson moving to Aston Villa for a combined £2.9m and Pembridge moving to Sheffield Wednesday. The side was also weakened when goalkeeper Martin Taylor, an ever-present the previous season and touted for a place in the England squad, broke his leg in a 1–0 defeat at Southend United and was out of action for the next 29 months. With chairman Lionel Pickering's increased frustration at no return on his investment, the purse strings were tightened and McFarland was unable to buy suitable replacements, instead blooding youth products such as Dean Sturridge, Russell Hoult and Lee Carsley to fill the gaps created by the departures. In the event Derby could only record a 9th-place finish and McFarland, in the knowledge his contract was not going to be renewed, said his goodbye's in the penultimate match of the season, a 2–1 home defeat at Southend United, ending a 28-year association with the club, broken only by a two-year spell as player-manager at Bradford City.

== Premier Rams and Pride Park Stadium (1995–2002) ==
A host of names were linked with the Baseball Ground managerial spot – including Martin O'Neill, Steve Coppell, Ossie Ardiles and Neil Warnock. Steve Bruce rejected the chance to be player-manager before the club finally selected Jim Smith. Out of a final two of Smith and Brian Horton. Smith, who appointed former Derby player Steve McClaren as his number two, joined a club with 15 out of contract players on high wages and players such as Craig Short, Mark Pembridge and Paul Williams intent on leaving. Smith sold them all, to Everton, Sheffield Wednesday and Coventry City respectively, raising £4.5m in the process. With promise that any money raised in player sales would be given to him for purchases, Smith began restructuring his squad with the signing of Robin Van Der Laan (£475,000 and Lee Mills) from Port Vale, Sean Flynn (a £250,000 makeweight in the Paul Williams deal), Gary Rowett (another makeweight, this time in exchange for Craig Short), Darryl Powell for £750,000 from Portsmouth and Ron Willems for £280,000 from Swiss champions Grasshopper Zürich. Smith's eye for capturing players such as Rowett and Flynn in part exchange deals, as well as the fact that most of Cox's big money buys had held a large percentage of their value, meant that his transfer dealings did not hit the red until the signing of Ashley Ward for £1m from Norwich City in March 1996.

"My brief was to reduce the wage bill and get some money in. "The board told me I could then have some of the cash to buy players, and they've kept their word. Mr Pickering's excited by the way things are shaping, so maybe he'll make more available. There's a buzz about the place, and I have a genuine feeling we can achieve success this season."

— Jim Smith prior to the 1995/96 promotion season

Employing his new signings alongside incumbent players such as Dean Sturridge and Russell Hoult, as well as McFarland's last major signing, Notts County defender Dean Yates (who was Player of the Season), Smith started the 1995–96 season poorly, with just 4 wins from their opening 14 games, but the influential signing of Igor Stimac for £1.57m from Hajduk Split proved the key. Although Stimac's debut ended in a heavy defeat, 5–1 to Tranmere Rovers with Stimac scoring, Smith's jigsaw was complete and Derby's season turned on its head. The club embarked on a 20 match unbeaten league run from 11 November 1995 to 5 March 1996, the club's best run inside of one season. In this sequence the club won 13 of its fixtures, scoring three or more goals on 8 occasions and recorded a 4–1 win at Birmingham City, their first win at St. Andrews since 1948, and catapulted themselves from the bottom five to the top of the table in the space of four months, at one point finding themselves 7 points clear at the top of the table. The run ended with a 0–3 defeat by title rivals Sunderland at Roker Park but the club recovered to take 12 points from their next 8 fixtures, including revenge on Tranmere with a 6–2 win at The Baseball Ground. They went into the last home game of the season against 3rd placed Crystal Palace knowing victory would guarantee promotion. After a 1–0 defeat at home to Leicester City on 10 September 1995, Derby had been unbeaten in the league at home, winning 13 – including 8 consecutively – and drawing 6, and Dean Sturridge, who finished the season as the club's top scorer with 20 goals, and Robin Van Der Laan ensured the club won 2–1 to secure 2nd place and a return to the top flight, and a first season in the Premier League, after a five-year absence. Smith became the first man to earn promotion at the first attempt in the club's history and had managed it with very little outlay, using his knowledge and experience to shape an attacking outfit which played football the right way.

The biggest event of the 1995–96 season, however, wasn't Derby's promotion but the announcement prior to a 1–1 draw with Luton Town on 21 February 1996, that the club would leave the Baseball Ground. Derby's home since 1894, The Baseball Ground had been reduced to just 18,000 seat due to the legal requirement for all seater stadia, and the club's revenue opportunities were held back by limited attendances and the move to a purpose built, 30,000 seater stadium, later name Pride Park Stadium, on the Pride Park business park just outside Derby city centre, was born more of necessity then desire. The Baseball Ground's location in residential area meant that after all alternatives had been explored, including the renovating the Baseball Ground to a 26,000 all-seater arena, it was decided it would be of more benefit for the club to move instead, with it being announced that the stadium would be completed for the start of the 1997–1998 season.

Smith prepared for Derby's first tilt at the Premiership with the signing of two players who had competed at that year's European Championship finals in Denmark defender Jacob Laursen and Croatia midfielder Aljoša Asanović. After starting the season with a 3–3 draw with old rivals Leeds United, Derby lost only one of their opening seven fixtures, recording a creditable 1–1 home draw with Champions Manchester United as well as a 2–1 win at Blackburn Rovers and a 1–0 win over Sunderland. However, a 0–2 defeat at home to Wimbledon (Derby's first home defeat in 23 league fixtures, equalling the club record set 67 years previously) showed a need for more experience and the inspired capture of Paul McGrath proved a key capture. A return of 10 points from a possible 12 in November saw the club peak at 9th in the league and showed that the club had the ability and wherewithal to stay in the Premiership although a crippling injury list contributed to a ten match winless streak mid-season which made sure safety was never a foregone conclusion, Derby finished the season in 12th, 6 points clear of relegation. Some memorable results occurred along the way, including a 2–2 draw away to Arsenal, a 4–2 victory over Tottenham Hotspur and a remarkable 3–2 victory against Manchester United, in which Mart Poom and Paulo Wanchope made their Derby debuts, Wanchope scoring a goal which was later voted the greatest in the club's history. An extended FA Cup saw The Baseball Ground hold its final three FA Cup fixtures ending with a 0–2 defeat by Middlesbrough in the quarter-finals before The Baseball Ground held its final ever match, against Arsenal, on 11 May 1996. In front of a sellout 18,287 crowd, the largest of the season, the match was preceded by a minutes silence as fans reflected on the memories of Derby's 102 years at the old stadium. In the event of the match Ashley Ward, who finished the season with 9 goals, 2 behind leading scorer Dean Sturridge. opened the scoring in the opening ten minutes before Arsenal took over to win 3–1 with Ian Wright grabbing the last ever first team goal at the ground in the 90th minute.

Pride Park Stadium
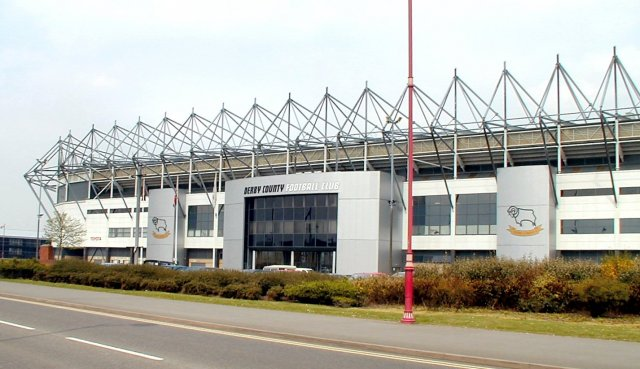

The first two seasons at The Pride Park Stadium were the peak of Jim Smith's time at Derby County. With established stars such as Stimac, Wanchope and Poom added to with the captures of Stefano Eranio and Francesco Baiano, Derby became renowned for their "rare mix of style and guile", more intent on attacking than defending. Smith's cosmopolitan side, built as he felt there was "very little market for British players" in the increasingly import soaked Premiership, recorded two consecutive top ten finishes in the 1997–98 (9th) and 1998–99 (8th) Premier League seasons, the first time the club had achieved this since Dave MacKay in the mid-1970s and flirted with qualification for Europe on both occasions. Pride Park was something of a fortress in its first six months as, after the abandonment of its first game against Wimbledon due to floodlight failure, Stefano Eranio's penalty in a 1–0 win over Barnsley kicked off a 12 match unbeaten start at the stadium, which included a 3–0 win over Arsenal and a 4–0 victory against Southampton. The Barnsley match had attracted a crowd of 27,232 (the club's biggest home attendance since 27, 783 watched a 3–1 home defeat against Manchester United in February 1980) and it broke 30,000 for the first time since a 2–1 home defeat against Nottingham Forest in 1979, in a 2–2 draw against Manchester United on 18 October 1997. Derby started the 1997–98 at a fine pace, peaking at 4th following the 4–0 win over Southampton, and Francesco Baiano, Player of the Season, flourished in particular; equalling the club record of scoring in six consecutive league games. One of these matches, a 5–2 victory over Sheffield Wednesday in which Baiano scored twice, was the club's first victory at Hillsborough since September 1936. However, Aston Villa's 1–0 win at Pride Park on 7 February 1997, the first home league defeat at the ground, saw the team lose their way somewhat and Europe was missed out on, with only 16 points taken from the final 36 available. A second tilt at European football was made in the 1998–99 season, the Rams peaking in 2nd place after 6 games with a 2–0 home win over Leicester City, eventually finishing one place better off in 8th. They reached the FA Cup Quarter finals for the third time in seven years, losing out only to late Nwankwo Kanu goal in a 0–1 away defeat by Arsenal, and recorded some memorable victories, including a league double over Liverpool 2–1 at Anfield and 3–2 at Pride Park and a 1–0 win over Nottingham Forest in the teams' first ever meeting at Pride Park. Derby County were a club on the up; Pride Park's capacity was expanded (32,913 fans attended the 3–2 victory over Liverpool) and Derby's players were getting noticed – five had represented their countries at the 1998 World Cup, and Christian Dailly was sold to Blackburn Rovers for £5.35m, comfortably the highest fee Derby had ever received. The key departure, however, was Steve McClaren – Smith's number two since he had taken the Derby managerial position 3 years earlier – who departed in February 1999 to become Sir Alex Ferguson's assistant at Manchester United, winning the treble in his first 3 months at Old Trafford. The 1998–99 season was Jim Smith's Derby County peak, as the financial demands of Premier League football began to catch up with them.

Several key players left in the build-up to the 1999–2000 season; Igor Štimac joined West Ham United for £600,000, Paulo Wanchope joined him at Upton Park for £3.5m, Lee Carsley joined Blackburn Rovers for £3.2m and Francesco Baiano also left in the course of the season. Despite raising over £7m in transfers, the club could no longer attract such quality of player to the club for affordable fees and only Seth Johnson and Esteban Fuertes were signed, the former for a club record £3m. The club paid the price, earning only 3 wins from their first 17 fixtures. In a desperate attempt to stave off relegation, the club signed Craig Burley, Branko Strupar and Lee Morris for a combined £8m in November 1999 (Georgi Kinkladze was also signed on loan from AFC Ajax before signing for £3m in the close season) and rallied to only lose 6 of their final 18 games, although they won only 5, to avoid relegation by 5 points, recording a 16th-placed finish. Strupar in particular adapted well to English football after arriving from Genk, netting 5 goals in 13 starts including the first Premier League goal of the new 2000 millennium with a 3rd-minute strike in a 2–0 win over Watford. Other notable results, such as a 3–1 win over Chelsea, a 4–1 win away at Middlesbrough and a 4–4 draw with Bradford City showed the club was still competitive and fans still attended in large numbers; 33,378 attending a 2–0 home defeat by Liverpool setting a new record for a Derby match at Pride Park. All this was temporarily overshadowed by controversy surrounding the signing of Fuertes who, after scoring twice, including the winner against Everton, was refused entry back into Britain after a club training break in Portugal when immigration officials discovered that his Italian passport was forged; Derby were able to recoup his fee by transferring him to French side Lens for £2.8m.

Although the improved end to the season had given fresh hope that the impetus of the late 1990s could be revived, such plans were dashed when the club took 14 matches to record its first league win of the 2000–01 season beating Bradford City 1–0. Whilst several players, such as Malcolm Christie, bought from Nuneaton Borough for £50,000 and eventually registering 30 goals in 129 appearances for the club over 5 years, Richard Jackson and Paul Boertien (both of whom spent nearly a decade at the club), were successfully captured from lower league sides, Smith's previous golden touch in the transfer market had appeared to desert him, as players such as Bjorn Otto Bragstad, Con Blatsis, and Daniele Daino where bought and barely registered on the field, with safety only guaranteed on the penultimate day of the 2000–01 FA Premier League season; Malcolm Christie's goal the difference in a 1–0 win away to Manchester United. Despite the headline grabbing capture of Italian international Fabrizio Ravanelli from Lazio, who scored on his debut in a 2–1 win over Blackburn Rovers, Derby's first opening day win since beating Sunderland 5–0 at the start of the 1993–94 season, Derby only took five points from their opening seven games of the 2000–01 season and Smith left his position in early October 2001, rejecting the position of Director of Football. He was replaced by Colin Todd, who had been his assistant since November 2000. Todd's tenure was a disaster as he recorded the shortest ever reign of a Derby manager, lasting just 98 days before he was sacked. After selling Seth Johnson to Leeds United for a club record £7m, Todd used the windfall to bring in François Grenet for £3m (who left after just 14 games to join Rennes for just £800,000), Luciano Zavagno and Pierre Ducrocq but results did not improve and he was removed from his position after an embarrassing 3–1 capitulation at home to Division Three Bristol Rovers in the FA Cup third round. Todd won just four of his fifteen league games in charge and recorded heavy defeat by Fulham (2–5), Manchester United (0–5), Middlesbrough (1–5) and West Ham United (0–4) but, as Gerald Mortimer stated, "Derby could not have it both ways. Either they were wrong to appoint (Todd) or wrong to dismiss him... Pickering's Chairmanship was pointing the club towards disaster." Another former Rams hero. John Gregory, was Todd's replacement, signing a three-and-a-half-year contract and becoming Derby's third manager of an increasingly troubled campaign, and initial seemed to have the force of personality to keep the Rams up. At one stage touted as a future England manager, Gregory had been in place at Aston Villa but his relationship with Villa chairman Doug Ellis led him to walk out to take charge at Derby. Gregory immediately bought in Newcastle pair Warren Barton and Rob Lee, and recorded three wins and a creditable 2–2 draw with Manchester United in his first seven games. The third of these wins, 3–1 away to Bolton Wanderers looked like pointing towards survival, but it proved to be Derby's last win of the season as they proceeded to lose their next seven games on the trot, the sixth of which, 0–2 at Liverpool, confirmed relegation after a 6-year stay in the top flight. The season ended with a 1–1 draw at Sunderland which took the club to 30 points, their lowest return for 11 years, and 19th place.

== Back in the Football League (2002–2006) ==
Derby had budgeted for a fourth bottom finish (i.e. survival) in the Premier League and when this was not achieved the club was once again plunged into financial crisis. In an attempt to bounce back to the top flight at the first time of asking the club rejected offers for their better players over the summer -such as Malcolm Christie, Mart Poom, Danny Higginbotham and Chris Riggott – and an opening day 3–0 win over Reading seemed to have justified the decision. However, this proved a false dawn and a 1–0 defeat away to Gillingham in the next game signalled what was to come as the club won just 10 of its opening 29 fixtures and suffered embarrassing cup exits to lower league teams Brentford (FA Cup) and Oldham Athletic (League Cup). Players weren't paid on time (resulting in Danny Higginbotham going on strike), with high earning players such as Georgi Kinkladze and Fabrizio Ravanelli underperforming, and the club was trading insolvent. Christie, Riggott, Higginbotham and Poom were eventually sold in the January 2002 Transfer window, netting considerably less than they would have if sold the previous summer, and joined players like Horacio Carbonari, Darryl Powell and Deon Burton in exiting the club (Burton leaving as the club's most capped ever player, with 42 appearances for Jamaica). With the club low on registered professionals, home grown youngsters were given a chance at first team level, with Lee Holmes (who became the youngest player in the club's history when he took the field against Grimsby aged 15 years and 268 days), Lee Grant, Pablo Mills, Izale McLeod and Lee Camp all handed debuts throughout the course of the season. Although the club won its first game following the exodus 3–0 against Rotherham United they then embarked on 9 match winless streak which seriously threatened relegation. The eight match of this run was a 0–3 defeat by Nottingham Forest and Gregory was suspended the next day, the club alleging serious misconduct. Nothing specific was ever offered and the next board had to pay Gregory a seven figure settlement. Gregory's replacement (initially on a short-term contract until the end of the season but then appointed full-time) was former Ipswich Town boss George Burley. His remit was simple: avoid relegation. A 2–1 win over Norwich City in Burley's first match got his reign off to the perfect start, and although only 6 points were taken from the next 6 games, it was enough to finish 18th in the league with 52 points, 6 clear of relegated Sheffield Wednesday in 22nd.

Burley's first full season in charge brought little joy, as they recorded a 20th-placed finish in the 2003–04 Division One, just 1 point clear of relegation with safety not confirmed until the penultimate game of the season with a 2–0 win over Millwall. With no money for players, and the need to slash the club's wage bill, big names such as Fabrizio Ravanelli, Georgi Kinkladze and Craig Burley left the club with the gaps of their departure shored up by free signings; Candido Costa was taken on a season long loan whilst seven others – including Mathias Svensson and Leon Osman – were recruited on short-term loans, as Derby used a club record 36 different players in the course of the season. Of the eight loanees, only Everton's Osman made a significant impact and without him Derby could well have been relegated, as the club collected almost half of its 52 points from his 17 games. There was also the continued introduction of academy players to the side, with Tom Huddlestone and Marcus Tudgay making significant contributions alongside players such as Lee Grant and Lee Holmes. Burley achieved safety against a background of boardroom uncertainty – Chairman Lionel Pickering, after putting temporary faith in former Coventry City chairman Bryan Richardson and a notional £30m bond, was removed from the chair after the club temporarily entered receivership by The Co-operative Bank, who instantly installed a new board composed of John Sleightholme, Jeremy Keith and Steve Harding, for the cost of £1 each.

With no money to spend, Burley played the markets and made two key free signings in Iñigo Idiakez and Grzegorz Rasiak. Idiakez was voted the club's Player of the Season and Rasiak finished top scorer (with 17 goals) as Derby confounded their form of the last 5 years to grab a fourth-placed finish in the newly rebranded Football League Championship and entrance into the 2004–05 Playoffs. With a more settled side than he was previously allowed – Burley only used 24 players, 7 of whom were involved in 10 or less games – and a strong mix of academy graduates (Lee Grant, Pablo Mills, Tom Huddlestone, Marcus Tudgay) and inspired purchases (Rasiak, Idiakez, Tommy Smith) Derby enjoyed a splendid second half to the season, recording just 6 defeats in their final 24 fixtures, including a run of 1 defeat in 14, and equalled the club record for away wins in a season and setting a club record of 6 consecutive away victories. However, the club entered the Playoffs without the presence of key duo Rasiak and Idiakez – both unavailable through injury – and a 2–0 defeat in the first leg away to Preston North End proved impossible to overturn in the second leg at Pride Park, which finished 0–0 in front of a crowd of over 31,000. Behind the scenes circumstances were deteriorating, and Burley left his position, citing interference from football agent turned Director of Football Murdo Mackay, and the sale of Huddlestone, to Tottenham Hotspur, against his wishes. Financial circumstances were worsening as the debt spiralled to £30m plus, despite Burley building success on the pitch without using any transfer funds. A refinancing scheme was put in place which saw Pride Park sold to the "mysterious" Panama-based ABC Corporation and the club paying rent of £1m a year to play there, which local journalist Gerald Mortimer described as "an affront.. to those who put everything into building (the ground)."

Burley was replaced by Phil Brown, who had successfully been Assistant Manager at Bolton Wanderers. However, Brown was unable to match Burley's ability to bring in quality players on a restricted budget, and was further weakened when Grzegorz Rasiak was sold under his nose to Tottenham Hotspur on the last day of the August Transfer Window, not giving him time to bring in a replacement. Brown needed a wise head with him as assistant but instead selected Dean Holdsworth, with no experience in the role, as his support and built a side constantly in flux; 22 Derby players made their debut during the 2005–06 season many of whom were "ineffective" loanees, such as Stern John, Khalilou Fadiga and Johnnie Jackson. A poor start, just 3 wins from 20 matches, put any hopes of a repeat of the previous campaign to bed and Brown was under intense pressure almost straight away. The sale of Marcus Tudgay to Sheffield Wednesday, to raise funds for the capture of Darren Moore to strengthen the defence, left the club with just one recognised striker, 35-year-old Paul Peschisolido, and, after just 33 games in charge, Brown was sacked as Derby manager after a 6–1 defeat at Coventry City was followed by an embarrassing 3–1 FA Cup exit to League One side Colchester United. He was replaced by Academy Coach Terry Westley who made key captures in Alan Wright, Kevin Lisbie and Michael McIndoe as well as introduced youngsters such as Lewin Nyatanga and Giles Barnes into regular first team action. Although results did not improve dramatically (most games ended in draws, taking the club to a record 20 draws in a single campaign) Derby managed to take 18 points from their final 16 games and avoided relegation, finishing 20th.

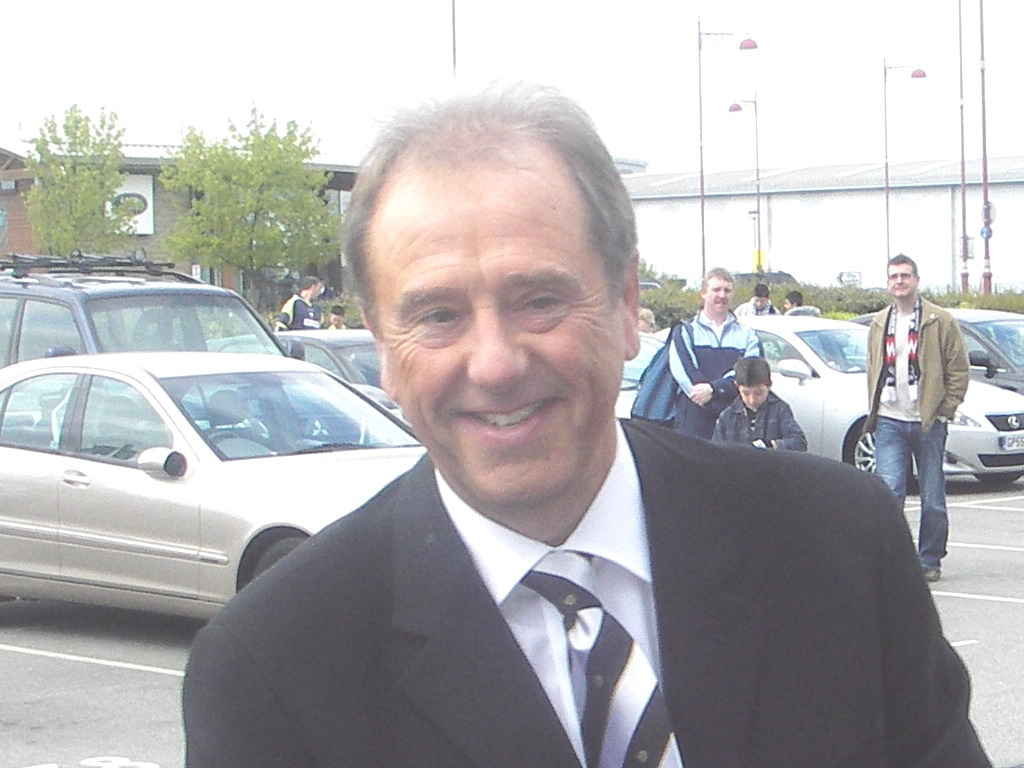
Former Rams chairman Peter Gadsby

Again, however, the season was overshadowed by confusion off the pitch. The ownership trio of Sleightholme, Keith and Harding, dubbed "The Three Amigos", came under increasing criticism from the Derby support, with two separate supporters groups set up in protest of their ownership in the form of the RamsTrust and the Rams Protest Group (RPG). When Derbyshire Constabulary received allegations of financial irregularities, Sleightholme resigned his position as chairman in April 2006, stating "My position has been made untenable. Recently it has come to my attention that meetings have been held, important decisions taken and documents signed without my knowledge. Important information has been withheld from me." A group of local businessmen, dubbed "The League of Gentlemen" by the local press, and led by former board member Peter Gadsby, emerged to take over the club at the end of April 2006, although Jeremy Keith, with the back of London venture capital company SISU, fought hard to retain control. It was revealed that the debt had risen to £52million, with the Gadsby-led consortium injecting more than £20million, paying off the ABC Corporation loan and negotiated a deal over the remaining debt with the Co-operative Bank, as well as returning Pride Park to club ownership. Three years later, Murdo Mackay, Jeremy Keith and finance director Andrew McKenzie were charged with taking a secret commission worth £440,625 from the club and were each sentenced to a combined seven and a half years in prison.

== Promotion and the Premiership nightmare (2006–2008) ==
2007 Football League Championship play-off Final
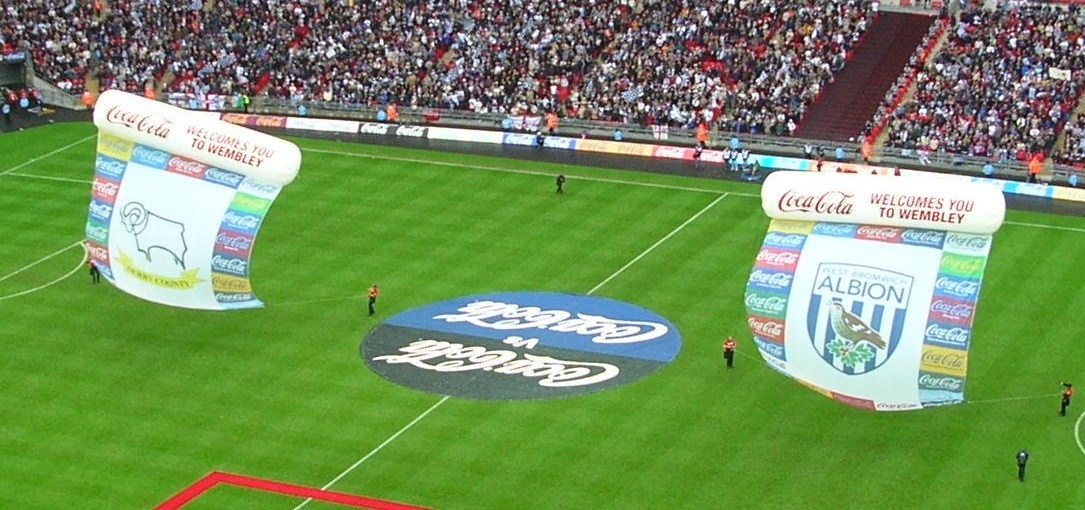
Derby County	West Bromwich Albion
1	0
- Date: 28 May 2007
- Venue: Wembley Stadium, London
- Man of the Match: Matt Oakley
- Referee: Graham Poll
- Attendance: 74,993
- Weather: Rain

Despite interest from Westley in taking the position of manager, former Preston North End boss Billy Davies was appointed Derby County's new permanent manager, having taken Preston North End into the playoffs in the previous two seasons. With new ownership, Derby were able to compete in the transfer market for the first time in a number of years, with Luton Town's Steve Howard becoming the club's first £1m singing since François Grenet six years previously and, alongside captures from Premiership club's such as West Ham United's Stephen Bywater and Fulham defender Dean Leacock, Davies began shaping a side capable of competing at the right end of the table. This wasn't apparent from the off, however, and a return of just 5 points from the club's opening 6 fixtures did not hint at instant success for Davies, leaving influential and creative players such as Tommy Smith and Iñigo Idiakez to depart the club prior to the closing of the August transfer window. However, a Steve Howard header in a 1–0 win at Wolves on 12 September 2006 proved a catalyst as the club lost only 4 of its next 27 fixtures (a run which included winning all 6 league fixtures in November 2006 and an 8 match winning streak, 6 league, 2 FA Cup, from 30 December 2006 up until 10 February 2007). Unlike the flair of Burley's playoff team, Davies side was built on a strong defence with more than 1 goal conceded in a match on just 4 occasions as a tightly knit defence of Marc Edworthy, Dean Leacock, Darren Moore and Mo Camara helped Bywater to keep 12 clean sheets, including 5 on the trot through January. After a 2–2 draw at home to Hull City on 10 February 2007, Derby were 7 points clear at the top of the table and had strengthened for the promotion run in with the signing of Tyrone Mears, Jay McEveley, Gary Teale, David Jones, Craig Fagan, Stephen Pearson and Jon Macken for a combined £5m. However, a 0–2 defeat away to Plymouth Argyle in the FA Cup Fifth round preceded a notable wobble in results and the club recorded a return of just 6 points from the next 5 games, conceding top spot to Birmingham City after a 0–1 defeat at St. Andrews on 9 March 2007. A resounding 5–1 win against Colchester United (by far the biggest win of a campaign which saw victory by a two-goal or above margin on just 6 occasions) looked to have put the club back on track but after taking just 12 points from the next 10 fixtures, the club slipped out of the automatic promotion places altogether and a 0–2 defeat at Crystal Palace in the penultimate game of the season confirmed a 3rd-placed finish and entry into the 2006–07 Championship playoffs.

In the semi-finals the club were drawn against 6th placed Southampton, managed by former manager George Burley, whose Derby side had been knocked out the 2004/05 playoffs by Billy Davies' Preston North End. After Steve Howard (the club's Player of the Season) netted his 18th and 19th goals of the season in a 2–1 win at St. Mary's in the first leg, a dramatic 120th-minute strike by former Ram Grzegorz Rasiak took the game to penalties after the match finished 3–2 to Southampton after extra time in the second leg at Pride Park. Another former Derby favourite, Iñigo Idiakez, missed the decisive penalty to see Derby through to the newly completed Wembley Stadium to face off against West Bromwich Albion in the 2007 Football League Championship play-off final. The match was dubbed "The £60m Final" (in reference to what the winning club would expect to earn as a result of competing in the Premiership) and, after three failed attempts, Derby finally won promotion via the playoffs thanks to Stephen Pearson's 61st-minute goal, his first for the club, proving the decisive moment in a 1–0 victory. Davies praised the players "great courage", emphasising the importance of scoring the first goal and making note of how organised and well-prepared his side had been, adding promotion was "a dream come true." The day after the game, thousands of Derby County supporters lined the streets of the city as the club's staff and players took part in an open top bus tour.

In preparation for the club's return to the Premier League, Davies spent the summer busily improving the playing and backroom staff, strengthening the squad with established Premier League players such as Andy Todd as well as big money signings such as Sheffield United's £3m defender Claude Davis and new club record signing Rob Earnshaw for £3.5m. Despite this however, Derby made a disastrous start to the Premier League 2007-08 season and following their 6–0 defeat by Liverpool on 1 September 2007, Irish bookmakers Paddy Power decided to pay out on the club to be relegated after just five games of the new season. The poor start saw fans accuse Gadsby and the board of failing to invest properly in players for the club and, on 29 October 2007, Gadsby stepped down as chairman to be replaced by former Hull City owner Adam Pearson. Meanwhile, results on the pitch weren't improving, with another poor performance away to Aston Villa (0–2) being followed by a 5–0 home defeat against a West Ham side ravaged by injuries. After taking just 6 points from 14 matches Davies left by mutual consent The move was seen to be more as a result of Davies publicly questioning Adam Pearson's chairmanship of the club in a post-match interview following a 2–0 home defeat by Chelsea than actual results (as Pearson publicly gave Davies his backing a few weeks previously), with some supporters suggesting Davies engineered his dismissal as he was unable to turn the club around. Within two days of Davies's dismissal, on 26 November 2007, Derby appointed highly rated former Wigan manager Paul Jewell. On 28 January 2008, it was announced that Derby had been purchased by American group General Sports and Entertainment, with Tom Glick taking the role of new president and chief executive. and although Jewell frantically tried to restructure the playing staff in the January 2008 transfer window, selling several players and bringing eight new players in, including Everton defender Alan Stubbs, ex-England international defender Danny Mills on loan from Manchester City and Blackburn midfielder Robbie Savage results did not improve and Derby's relegation was confirmed on 29 March 2008, the first time a club had been relegated from the division before April and sealing the club's first immediate relegation following promotion in its history. Poor results continued: a 6–0 home defeat at the hands of Aston Villa on 12 April 2008 is the biggest defeat at Pride Park and, by the season's end, they had recorded the Premier League's lowest points total (11). and equalled Loughborough's 108-year Football League record of going through an entire season with only one win.

== The Championship years (2008–2022) ==
Despite such an embarrassing relegation from the Premier League, hopes were high of an immediate return, especially after manager Paul Jewell's summer reconstruction of the squad seeing 16 players come in and 12 leave. However, things did not go to plan and the club spent the majority of the season in the lower reaches of the table. They were bottom of the league going into the August international break, after a 2–0 defeat away to Barnsley left the club with a single point from the first four games of the season. A 2–1 win over Sheffield United was the club's first league win in almost a year, bringing to an end of a 38-game winless sequence, and kickstarted a mini rival and a run of just one defeat in 11, with 5 wins, which lifted the club to the season high of 9th. The form soon dipped again and, after a run of just 2 wins in 11 matches which left the club 18th in the table, Jewell quit as manager on 28 December 2008 after just over a year in the job. He left with a record of just 13 wins in 58 matches, though he did take the club to their first major cup semi-final in over 30 years when the club reached the League Cup final four, where they lost 4–3 on aggregate to eventual winners Manchester United. Jewell was replaced by Nigel Clough, manager of local non-League club Burton Albion and son of club legend Brian Clough. Despite overseeing two defeats in his first two games, Clough soon turned the club's form around, taking them to the 5th round of the FA Cup and just 3 defeats in 13 matches, a run which included 4 consecutive wins. A run of three consecutive defeats in mid April meant that survival wasn't guaranteed until the penultimate game of the season when Player of the Year Rob Hulse scored the winner in a 1–0 win over Charlton Athletic at Pride Park.

With money tight, Clough was forced to cobble together a team from free transfers and loan deals ahead of the 2009–10 season, with 14 players signing temporary deals over the season. Whilst the media optimistically predicted a push for a play-off places Derby once again struggled against relegation for much of the season, before a run of just two defeats in the final 10 fixtures saw the club finish in 14th. A club record 40 players represented the club.

In the 2010–11 season, safety was not guaranteed until the 44th fixture when, despite losing 3–2 at Norwich City other results left the bottom three unable to overtake them. The club's return of 49 points (from a possible 138) was the club's lowest ever return from a 46-game programme and was their lowest points total in the second tier since 1984. The Derbyshire evening telegraph summed up the season as being one in which "with a few exceptions, (Derby) have competed in all the games and yet too often they have come out on the wrong end of the result having been the architects of their own downfall. Mistakes, individually and collectively, carelessness and a lack of concentration have all proved costly. As well as they have played in spells, notably in a wonderful purple patch earlier this season, the bottom line is that at other times they have not been good enough, as their position in the table indicates. That is why an influx of new faces is needed in this most important of summers to make sure they move forward next season."

In the 2011–12 season Derby started the season well, winning their first 4 league games in August, which was also the club's best league start since the 1905–06 season. October and November were disappointing with Derby picking up only 1 win and 5 points out of a possible 30 as Derby fell to 15th place in the league, with a 4–0 defeat at rivals Leicester City at the start of the month, starting the slump in form. In mid-October, Nigel Clough and his backroom staff signed new 3 1/2-year contracts. Derby finished the season 12th in the league, 11 points off the play-off players, with Nigel Clough being satisfied with the performances of the team, stating a lack of firepower as the reason why they fell short and a target to improve in 2012–13. Mason Bennett made his debut during the season, setting a club record for youngest ever team player, making his first appearance against Middlesbrough on 22 October 2011 at 15 years and 99 days old, beating Lee Holmes' record by 169 days. In October 2011, Derby County announced that they had submitted plans to Derby City Council for a £7 million development of land outside the stadium, which the club named "The Plaza @ Pride Park". The plans included five cafes/restaurants, two convenience stores and 2,000 square metres of office space. The plans were scaled down from the planned £20 million pound development proposed in 2007. Derby County CEO Tom Glick, said that the plans would help the club deal with the new Financial Fair Play regulations, due to be introduced in the Football League from 2012, as revenue from the Plaza was intended to be reinvested back into the club. The planned development also coincided with plans from the City Council to build a multi-use sports arena on the same site as the proposed Plaza. Derby City Council's Planning Control Committee gave planning permission for The Plaza @ Pride Pride Park development in January 2012, with chief executive Tom Glick stating the club had started looking for a development company to build the plaza.

Nigel Clough described the club's 2012–13 campaign as being "Frustratingly close to being in the top six (but) we were also very pleased with the level of performances, home and away." Steve Nicholson of the Derby Telegraph added that Derby's 10th-placed finish was "thoroughly deserved" and noted that only the small size of the squad, combined with injuries and a lack of signings in the January transfer window, meant that the club did not qualify for the play-offs. He also praised Derby's home form, their best in six years, and noted that "foundations are in place" for a top six finish.

Clough was sacked nine games into the 2013–14 season, after defeat to local rivals Nottingham Forest, and was replaced by former Derby player and assistant manager Steve McClaren. Under McClaren the club finished third in the Championship and reached the final of the play-offs, after beating Brighton & Hove Albion 6–2 on aggregate in the semifinals, although in the finals they lost 1–0 to Queens Park Rangers in the 89th minute. McClaren also saw The Rams beat their record for most goals scored in one season (84 goals).

The 2014–15 season saw Derby competing at the top end of the Championship for much of the season, even leading the table going into March. However, a slump in performances and a poor run of form towards the end of the season in which Derby only picked up two wins in thirteen matches saw them slide down to eighth, not only missing out on automatic promotion, but the play-off positions as well. As a result of this, on 25 May 2015 Steve McClaren was sacked.

Paul Clement was announced as McClaren's successor ahead of the 2015–16 season, with local businessman Mel Morris named as the new Club Chairman. Pre-season spending saw Derby twice break their club-record transfer fee, with the £4,750,000 signing of Hull City's Tom Ince followed by the capture of Norwich City's Bradley Johnson for £6,000,000 as part of an unprecedented £24,000,000 outlay. The season started very strongly, with just two defeats in the opening half of the season seeing Derby sitting at the top of the table with 47 points after 23 games. Results started to falter after a 2–2 draw with Leeds United and, following a 1–1 draw with Reading, Chairman Mel Morris entered the changing room to criticise the players' performance and cancel a training camp in Saudi Arabia, telling the players "You're not training in the sun, you're training in the mud." Following a seven-match winless run which saw the club drop to 5th place in the table, Clement was sacked on 8 February 2016, though Morris said the sacking was not due to results but because "not enough progress had been made" in the club's playing style. Academy director Darren Wassall was appointed as coach for the remainder of the season. Derby finished fifth in the league, qualifying for the play-offs, but lost 3–2 on aggregate to eventual winners Hull in semi finals.

Former Leicester City boss Nigel Pearson was appointed head coach in May 2016. Derby once again broke their transfer record, with Czech international Matěj Vydra joining for £8,000,000 from Watford, while Jeff Hendrick became the club's highest ever outgoing transfer with a £10,500,000 move to Burnley. Derby started poorly under Pearson, with only one win in the opening nine games. After a 2–1 home defeat to Blackburn Rovers saw Derby slip into the relegation zone, Pearson was suspended on 27 September 2016 whilst the club undertook an internal investigation into his management after a training ground altercation with Mel Morris compounded already growing concerns over his management methods Assistant manager Chris Powell took over in a caretaker role for two games until Pearson was sacked on 8 October.

"Mel Morris (is) a micro-manager who demands success and is not known for his patience - four managers in just over a year testify to that. But it is his club, his £100m-plus investment, and he will run it his way."

— Pat Murphy on Mel Morris

Although Steve Bruce, Gary Rowett and Powell were linked with the manager's position, Morris instead re-appointed Steve McClaren as manager on 12 October, less than 18-months after having sacked him. McClaren rejuvenated the Rams, taking them from 20th place to 7th in 10 weeks with 29 points from 12 games, including a seven match winning streak. However, results fell off in equally spectacular fashion after the New Year, as only 12 points from a possible 36 saw the Rams spiral down to 10th place, 10 points away from a play-off position. McClaren was sacked on 12 March 2017 following a 3–0 defeat away to Brighton, which included a performance that Mel Morris described as being "far from what we expect to see from those wearing a Derby County shirt." Two days later, former player Gary Rowett was appointed as Derby boss, Derby's third manager of the season and Morris' fifth manager in 13 months. Rowett signed a contract until the end of the 2018–19 season. and took 15 points for the final nine games to guide them to a 9th-placed finish.

The club endured three unsuccessful play-off campaigns, failing in the semi-finals twice and losing in the 2019 final to Aston Villa. In May 2021, the club, now managed by Wayne Rooney, narrowly avoided relegation to League One. Earlier, in October 2020, it was announced that Morris was intending to sell the club and was actively seeking new owners. In May 2021, the club, by then managed by Wayne Rooney, narrowly avoided relegation to League One. Earlier, in October 2020, it was announced that Morris was intending to sell the club and was actively seeking new owners. A potential deal with a Middle Eastern-backed company was discontinued in March 2021, after which an agreed sale to a Spanish businessman, Erik Alonso, also fell through after doubts about Alonso's funding emerged, alongside possible EFL sanctions regarding breaches of financial fair play regulations and a deduction of nine points remained under consideration in mid-September 2021. On 8 July 2021, the EFL imposed a transfer embargo on the club, leaving Rooney with a squad of just nine contracted senior professionals. The EFL later relaxed the embargo but said any deals would have strict wage limits. Following a long-term injury to Colin Kazim-Richards in the early stage of the 2021–22 season, the club were given special dispensation by the EFL to bring in veteran defender Phil Jagielka and striker Sam Baldock.

On 17 September 2021, the club's board of directors announced that the club was to go into administration, and the EFL confirmed Derby faced a 12-point deduction. Having invested "in excess of £200m" in the club, owner Mel Morris apologised to fans and staff about the club going into administration. Relegated in May 2021, former Championship club Wycombe Wanderers considered legal action against Derby County following the administration announcement, as did Middlesbrough. On 22 September 2021, the club formally went into administration and were deducted 12 points, leaving them bottom of the Championship. During October and November 2021, former Derby owner Andy Appleby, US businessman Chris Kirchner, and Sandy and James Easdale, were named as interested parties as administrators looked for a buyer for the club, planning to shortlist three preferred bidders by the end of 2021. However, a quick sale was unlikely pending discussions with HMRC, and confirmation of Derby's full liabilities. On 16 November, the club had a further deduction of nine points for breaching EFL accounting rules, leaving the club on −3, 18 points from safety. A further three-point deduction, for breaches of EFL profitability and sustainability rules, was suspended. Derby and related companies were reported to owe £29.3m to HMRC. Other liabilities included a £20m loan from US investment group MSD Holdings, plus various football and trade creditors owed around £15m.

On 21 November 2021, Quantuma said it hoped to identify a preferred buyer "in the next two to three weeks", with Kirchner the only potential buyer to have publicly confirmed his interest. On 2 December, after press speculation that the club might go into liquidation due to the scale of its debts, Rooney insisted that was not an option. On 18 December, he said three bids had been received and a preferred bidder should be announced by Christmas, and administrators hoped to complete a sale "in or around February 2022". On 24 December, Kirchner withdrew his bid. Then, on 7 January 2022, former Newcastle United owner Mike Ashley was reported to be interested in buying the club.

On 14 January 2022, with no immediate prospect of Derby County's purchase (hampered by the legal actions involving Middlesbrough and Wycombe), the EFL gave administrators until 1 February 2022 to provide information about how they intended to fund the club until the end of the season. The Middlesbrough and Wycombe claims, if proved, could leave Derby with liabilities running into millions (the BBC suggested as much as £60 million), because football debts must be paid in full. Consequently, potential purchasers were unwilling to commit to buying the club. As a result, the BBC reported on 17 January that Derby's administrators could seek a legal ruling that the claims do not fall within the normal "football-related" agreements over issues such as transfer fees and ticket sales. Middlesbrough and Wycombe subsequently said they were willing to discuss a possible compromise. On 20 January, the club's administrators committed to providing the EFL with funding information "within days", after the EFL said "the club will run out of cash by February". The following day, another bid to buy the club, from the Binnie family, founders of US investment company Carlisle Capital, was reported, but the £28m offer did not include the stadium, against which the MSD Holdings loan was secured. Following the Binnie bid, and reports that former chairman Andy Appleby was working on an alternative bid that included the stadium, the EFL and administrators Quantuma were due to meet on 25 January to discuss the club's future.

On 27 January 2022, Quantuma and the EFL announced that administrators had been given an extra month to provide proof of how Derby would be funded for the rest of the season. The EFL also rejected Derby's efforts to reclassify its footballing debts relating to the Middlesbrough and Wycombe legal actions. On 3 February, a source close to the Binnie bid told the BBC they feared the club was heading for liquidation because of financial risks relating to the legal actions. During the January transfer window, nine players left Derby, which remained under a transfer embargo and seven points from safety in the Championship, after a defeat at Huddersfield. On 4 February, trying to "unlock the impasse" over Derby's sale, former owner, Mel Morris, invited Middlesbrough and Wycombe to take their compensation claims to the High Court against him personally. On 11 February, it was announced that Morris had reached a private "accord" with Middlesbrough's owner and details had been shared with the administrators, but there was no update regarding Wycombe's claim. As the 28 February deadline approached without news of a sale, the EFL called for an urgent funding update from Quantuma. On 1 March, it was reported the EFL had no plans to expel the club despite administrators missing the deadline, and a defeat at Cardiff City left Derby eight points from safety with 11 Championship games to play. On 2 March, the administrators said they had sought "further requests for clarity from prospective purchasers" and hoped to be able to name a preferred bidder "shortly". The EFL said the "lack of progress" in naming a preferred bidder, or providing proof of funding, was "threatening the very future of Derby County". Even after Quantuma provided a forecast showing the club had "sufficient cash" to get to the end of the season, the EFL still felt "a number of challenges" remained.

On 4 March 2022, Quantuma said it was in "active dialogue" with potential buyers: "Due to the complex nature of the mechanics of the bids received, it is necessary for us to work through each of these matters individually, to ensure the bids meet our terms of purchase. ... We remain confident that we will be in a position to name a preferred bidder shortly." However, on 10 March, the Binnie family ended their bid to buy the club after a £30 million offer was rejected by Quantuma as too low, with the administrators thought to be seeking bids of around £50 million. Meanwhile, and subject to completion of international paperwork, Derby sold Polish international winger, Kamil Jóźwiak, to US MLS side Charlotte FC for £2 million - funds that would help the club survive to the end of the season. A preferred bidder had still not been announced by the end of March 2022, with Quantuma disappointed at "attempts by some parties to delay and undermine the process". Manager Wayne Rooney said: "I don't know where the club's going, I don't know if the club's going to be here next season."

On 6 April 2022, with the club nine points from safety with six matches remaining, Chris Kirchner was confirmed by Quantuma as the preferred bidder, having recently renewed interest in Derby County following a failed attempt to buy Championship rivals Preston North End. The administrators said his offer "represents the best deal for creditors and one which will secure the long-term future of the club", but did not include the stadium (owned by former majority shareholder Mel Morris), about which further negotiation would be needed. The arrangements were also subject to review by the EFL. With games running out and a third spell of third-tier football looking increasingly likely, Rooney talked about the continuing transfer embargo ("You cannot just pick players out of thin air"), and a 15-point penalty remained a possibility if outstanding debts were not settled in line with EFL insolvency rules.

Following a defeat at QPR on 18 April 2022, Derby County were relegated to League One. With a final-day defeat by Cardiff City, the club ultimately finished 23rd on 34 points, seven points from safety. Kirchner subsequently confirmed that Derby's business plan would be handed to the EFL for approval on 22 April, with the club set to abide by EFL rules on paying creditors to avoid a 15-point penalty next season. On 28 April 2022, Rooney said he expected Kirchner's takeover to be completed within 10 days. Until the sale was agreed, and EFL checks had been completed, Derby remained under a transfer embargo, with only five first-team players contracted beyond June 2022. Rooney also said that Derby City Council was working towards a deal to purchase the club's ground, but on 8 May an "impasse" in negotiations over the ground's purchase was reported to be holding up the takeover deal, and the exclusivity period for the Kirchner takeover bid was extended. On 17 May 2022, Quantuma exchanged contracts for the club's sale to Kirchner with completion scheduled by 31 May 2022, later revised to 1 June 2022. Local businessmen, 'Team Derby' MPs and city council bosses continued to work on a deal to purchase Pride Park, so that the Kirchner takeover could be completed. However, the takeover remained incomplete into early June, and Kirchner was given until 5pm on Friday, 10 June 2022, to provide evidence that he could complete the club's purchase. Quantuma also engaged with other interested parties, including Mike Ashley, as "a contingency measure". The deadline passed without any confirmation from Kirchner, and the BBC said the hold-up related to funds awaiting anti-money laundering approvals. With fixture announcements imminent, the EFL sought to become more closely involved in the sale, "increasingly concerned" that the delays presented "a real risk to the integrity of next season's competition".

On 13 June 2022, Kirchner withdrew his bid to buy Derby County. Quantuma resumed negotiations with a consortium led by former chairman Andy Appleby. Mike Ashley was reported as having renewed his interest in purchasing the club, but had started a court action regarding comments allegedly made by Quantuma's Carl Jackson. Housebuilding tycoon, and former Wolves chairman, Steve Morgan, was also reported to be interested. Discussions were not reopened with the Binnie family, but at least eight groups were reportedly interested, but the EFL was prevented by privacy agreements from dealing directly with bidders. The Appleby group submitted its bid on 16 June 2022, with Appleby potentially a "trusted" buyer after years of previous involvement. Quantuma had earlier revealed that HMRC's claim for unpaid taxes had risen to £36m, while the club owed finance company MSD £24m. Quantuma had also incurred costs of £2.1m in the first six months of the club's administration. Payment of the club's June wages bill was likely to require external funding, adding to the costs to be borne by any successful bidder. It was also unclear if any bidder would pay the sum Kirchner had agreed to, including paying football creditors in full and a minimum of 25p in the pound to other creditors, raising the potential of a 15-point deduction for Derby in the 2022–23 season. On 24 June 2022, Rooney quit as Derby's manager with immediate effect; Liam Rosenior became interim manager.

On 26 June 2022, after Derbyshire-based property developer David Clowes had purchased Pride Park, his bid to buy the club was accepted, and Quantuma granted Clowes preferred bidder status. The administrators said Clowes's offer complied with EFL insolvency policy, meaning Derby would avoid a further points deduction. Completion of the acquisition of the business and the assets of the club was initially targeted for 29 June; the deal - and the club's exit from administration - was eventually confirmed on 1 July 2022, though some constraints on transfers were agreed by the EFL and Derby's new owners. The club's transfer embargo was finally lifted in May 2023.

== League One (2022–2024) ==
In September 2022, Derby approached Rotherham United to request permission to speak to Paul Warne, who was announced as the club's new head coach on a four-year deal on 22 September 2022. The side vied for promotion, but missed out on the League One play-offs, finishing 7th, after a 1–0 defeat by Sheffield Wednesday at Hillsborough on 7 May 2023. In the 2023–24 season, they were promoted back to the Championship as runners-up with their highest ever points tally.
