= 1969–70 Derby County F.C. season =

Derby County
1969–70 season
- Chairman: Sam Longson
- Manager: Brian Clough
- Stadium: Baseball Ground
- First Division: 4th
- FA Cup: Eightfinals
- League Cup: Quarterfinals
- Top goalscorer: League: Kevin Hector; O'Hare (16); All: O'Hare (13)
Home colours	Away colours

The 1969–70 season was Derby County's 70th in the Football League and their 1st season in the First Division since being relegated in 1953.

== Season summary ==
In his fourth season as chairman, Sam Longson and his third season manager Brian Clough appointed Jimmy Gordon as the new assistant coach arriving from Blackburn Rovers and transferred in Welsh Central-back Terry Hennessey in February 1970 for a fee of £100,000. The squad finished the league season on a decent 4th spot (its best outcome since the 1948-49 season), including a sequence of 6 consecutive wins, which would have claimed the club its first ever European campaign as entrants in the Inter-Cities Fairs Cup but a joint FA and League disciplinary panel found the club guilty of 'gross negligence' after an unexplained gap of £3,000 in season-ticket income and payment of fees to Dave Mackay outside of the terms of his contract. The fine of £10,000 and a one-year ban from European competition saw the club bring in Preston North End secretary Stuart Webb into the club to help its administrative efficiency off the pitch match the playing efficiency on it. After the ban from Continental competitions, the club was invited to the inaugural Watney Cup.

Meanwhile, the team advanced to the FA Cup R5 stage only to be eliminated away at QPR. The squad reached the quarter final of the Football League Cup losing an away replay against Manchester United.

== Squad ==
Note: Flags indicate national team as defined under FIFA eligibility rules; some limited exceptions apply. Players may hold more than one non-FIFA nationality.

Pos.	Nation	Player
GK	ENG	Colin Boulton
GK	ENG	Les Green
DF	ENG	Ron Webster
DF	ENG	Tony Rhodes
DF	ENG	Peter Daniel
DF	ENG	Roy McFarland
DF	WAL	Terry Hennessey
DF	ENG	John Richardson
DF	ENG	John Robson
DF	ENG	Pat Wright
DF	ENG	Jim Walker

Pos.	Nation	Player
MF	SCO	Dave Mackay (Captain)
MF	ENG	Willie Carlin
MF	WAL	Alan Durban
MF	SCO	John McGovern
MF	ENG	Alan Hinton
MF	NIR	Arthur Stewart
FW	ENG	Kevin Hector
FW	SCO	John O'Hare
FW	ENG	Frank Wignall
FW	ENG	Barry Butlin

=== Transfers ===
In
Pos.	Name	from	Type
DF	Terry Hennessey	Nottingham Forest	£100,000

Out
Pos.	Name	To	Type
DF	Pat Wright	Southend United	
FW	Barry Butlin	Notts County	loan

== Competitions ==
=== First Division ===
==== League table ====
Pos	Team	Pld	W	D	L	GF	GA	GAv	Pts	Qualification or relegation
2	Leeds United	42	21	15	6	84	49	1.714	57	Qualification for the Inter-Cities Fairs Cup first round
3	Chelsea	42	21	13	8	70	50	1.400	55	Qualification for the Cup Winners' Cup first round (Note: Chelsea qualified for the Cup Winners' Cup first round as the 1969–70 FA Cup winners.)
4	Derby County	42	22	9	11	64	37	1.730	53	Qualification for the Watney Cup (Note: Derby County and Manchester United qualified for the Watney Cup as the two teams with the most goals that hadn't already qualified for a European competition.)
5	Liverpool	42	20	11	11	65	42	1.548	51	Qualification for the Inter-Cities Fairs Cup first round
6	Coventry City	42	19	11	12	58	48	1.208	49	Qualification for the Inter-Cities Fairs Cup first round

Source: World Football
Rules for classification: 1) Points; 2) Goal average; 3) Goals scored

==== Results by round ====
Round	1	2	3	4	5	6	7	8	9	10	11	12	13	14	15	16	17	18	19	20	21	22	23	24	25	26	27	28	29	30	31	32	33	34	35	36	37	38	39	40	41	42
Ground	H	A	A	H	H	A	A	H	H	A	H	A	H	H	A	H	A	H	A	H	A	H	A	H	A	A	H	A	H	A	H	A	H	A	H	A	H	A	A	H	H	A
Result	D	W	D	W	D	D	W	W	W	W	W	L	W	L	D	L	L	W	L	W	L	L	W	W	L	L	W	L	W	L	D	D	W	W	W	W	W	W	D	W	W	D
Position	9	4	8	5	7	7	6	4	3	3	3	3	2	3	2	3	3	3	4	5	5	6	5	3	4	5	5	5	5	6	6	5	4	4	4	3	3	4	3	3	3	4

Source: Competitive matches
A = Away; H = Home; W = Win; D = Draw; L = Loss; = Leader, Qualification to 1970–71 European Cup; = Qualification to 1970–71 Inter-Cities Fairs Cup; = Relegation to 1970–71 Second Division; c = Qualification for the Watney Cup

Derby County originally qualified to the 1970–71 Inter-Cities Fairs Cup by finishing 4th in the 1969–70 Football League. However, a disciplinary commission found the team guilty of administrative and financial irregularities. As a result, Derby County was not allowed to compete in the Fairs Cup. Newcastle United, the next best team not qualified for international competition, took its place.

==== Matches ====
- source: https://www.11v11.com/teams/derby-county/tab/matches/season/1970/

9 August 1969 1	Derby County	0-0	Burnley F.C.	Derby
				Stadium: Baseball Ground; Attendance: 29,459

12 August 1969 2	Ipswich Town	0-1	Derby County	Ipswich
19:30		Report	42' McFarland	Stadium: Portman Road; Attendance: 20,551; Referee: R. Tinkler

16 August 1969 3	Coventry City	1-1	Derby County	Coventry
	Martin 5'		4' McFarland	Stadium: Highfield Road; Attendance: 39,881

20 August 1969 4	Derby County	3-1	Ipswich Town	Derby
	Hinton 26' (pen.); Hinton 44'; Carlin 82'		19' Brogan	Stadium: Baseball Ground

23 August 1969 5	Derby County	0-0	Stoke City	Derby
				Stadium: Baseball Ground; Attendance: 36,170

27 August 1969 6	Wolverhampton Wanderers	1-1	Derby County	Wolverhampton
	Dougan 72'		15' Hinton	Stadium: Molineux Stadium; Attendance: 45,205

30 August 1969 7	West Bromwich Albion	0-2	Derby County	West Bromwich
			64' Mackay; 88' Hector	Stadium: The Hawthorns; Attendance: 34,541

6 September 1969 8	Derby County	2-1	Everton F.C.	Derby
	O’Hare 38'; Hector 66'		70' Kendall	Stadium: Baseball Ground; Attendance: 37,728

10 September 1969 9	Derby County	3-0	Southampton F.C.	Derby
	Alan Durban 13'; Willie Carlin 67'; Kevin Hector 48'			Stadium: Baseball Ground; Attendance: 35,826; Referee: G Hartley

13 September 1969 10	Newcastle United	0-1	Derby County	Newcastle upon Tyne
			47' McFarland	Stadium: St James' Park; Attendance: 39,360

20 September 1969 11	Derby County	5-0	Tottenham Hotspur	Derby
	Durban 15'; Durban 67'; Hector 20'; Carlin 23'; O’Hare 61'			Stadium: Baseball Ground; Attendance: 41,826

27 September 1969 12	Sheffield Wednesday	1-0	Derby County	Sheffield
	Warboys 38'			Stadium: Hillsborough; Attendance: 45,086

4 October 1969 13	Derby County	2-0	Manchester United	Derby
15:00	Hector 45'; Fitzpatrick 61' (o.g.)			Stadium: Baseball Ground; Attendance: 40,724

8 October 1969 14	Derby County	1-3	Coventry City	Derby
	Alan Durban		Neil Martin (o.g.)Roy McFarland; Jeff Blockley	Stadium: Baseball Ground; Attendance: 39,880

11 October 1969 15	Chelsea F.C.	2-2	Derby County	Fulham
	Houseman 57'; Hollins 82'		52' Hector; 71' O’Hare	Stadium: Stamford Bridge; Attendance: 51,421

18 October 1969 16	Derby County	0-1	Manchester City	Derby
			68' Lee	Stadium: Baseball Ground; Attendance: 40,788

25 October 1969 17	Leeds United	2-0	Derby County	Leeds
	Clarke 39', 42'			Stadium: Elland Road; Attendance: 44,183

1 November 1969 18	Derby County	4-0	Liverpool F.C.	Derby
15:00	McGovern 13'; Hector 14'; Hector 54'; O'Hare 69'	Report		Stadium: Baseball Ground; Attendance: 40,993; Referee: Baldwin

8 November 1969 19	Arsenal F.C.	4-0	Derby County	Highbury
	George 48'; Sammels 60', 66'; Armstrong 68'			Stadium: Highbury Stadium; Attendance: 49,753

15 November 1969 20	Derby County	3-0	Sunderland F.C.	Derby
	Durban 61'; Ashurst 82' (o.g.); Durban 88'			Stadium: Baseball Ground; Attendance: 31,918

22 November 1969 21	West Ham United	3-0	Derby County	Upton Park
	Hurst 22', 69'; Peters 57'			Stadium: Boleyn Ground; Attendance: 32,485

29 November 1969 22	Derby County	0-2	Nottingham Forest	Derby
		Report	35' Ian Storey-Moore; 62' Barry Lyons	Stadium: Baseball Ground; Attendance: 38,225

6 December 1969 23	Crystal Palace F.C.	0-1	Derby County	Selhurst
			18' Hector	Stadium: Selhurst Park; Attendance: 20,833

13 December 1969 24	Derby County	2-0	Newcastle United	Derby
	Hinton 84'; McGovern 86'			Stadium: Baseball Ground; Attendance: 30,057

20 December 1969 25	Everton F.C.	1-0	Derby County	Walton
	Ball 85'			Stadium: Goodison Park; Attendance: 44,914

26 December 1969 26	Stoke City	1-0	Derby County	Stoke-on-Trent
	Burrows (pen.)			Stadium: Victoria Ground; Attendance: 37,456

27 December 1969 27	Derby County	2-0	West Bromwich Albion	Derby
	O’Hare 10'; O'Hare 14'	Report		Stadium: Baseball Ground; Attendance: 35,581

10 January 1970 28	Tottenham Hotspur	2-1	Derby County	Tottenham
	Greaves 23'; Morgan 75'	Report	85' Carlin	Stadium: White Hart Lane; Attendance: 38,645

17 January 1970 29	Derby County	1-0	Sheffield Wednesday	Derby
	O’Hare 83'	Report		Stadium: Baseball Ground; Attendance: 32,991

31 January 1970 30	Manchester United	1-0	Derby County	Greater Manchester
	Charlton 26'	Report		Stadium: Old Trafford; Attendance: 59,584

11 February 1970 31	Derby County	2-2	Chelsea F.C.	Derby
	Durban 79'; Hector 83'	Report	43' Osgood; 78' Hudson	Stadium: Baseball Ground; Attendance: 35,109

14 February 1970 32	Burnley F.C.	1-1	Derby County	Burnley
	Frank Casper	Report	John O'Hare	Stadium: Turf Moor; Attendance: 18,470

21 February 1970 33	Derby County	3-2	Arsenal F.C.	Derby
	John O'Hare; Kevin Hector; Dave MacKay	Report	John Roberts; John Radford .	Stadium: Baseball Ground; Attendance: 35,284

28 February 1970 34	Liverpool F.C.	0-2	Derby County	Anfield
		Report	14' Hennessey; 71' O'Hare	Stadium: Anfield; Attendance: 43,594

7 March 1970 35	Derby County	3-0	West Ham United	Derby
	Durban 59'; Hinton 79' (pen.); O'Hare 84'	Report		Stadium: Baseball Ground; Attendance: 35,615

14 March 1970 36	Nottingham Forest	1-3	Derby County	West Bridgford
	Henry Newton	Report	Alan Durban; John O'Hare (o.g.)Liam O'Kane	Stadium: The City Ground; Attendance: 42,074

21 March 1970 37	Derby County	3-1	Crystal Palace F.C.	Derby
	Hinton 63' (pen.); Carlin 74'; Hector 89'	Report	47' C Jackson	Stadium: Baseball Ground; Attendance: 30,198

27 March 1970 38	Manchester City	0-1	Derby County	Moss Side
		Report	McFarland	Stadium: Maine Road; Attendance: 42,316

28 March 1970 39	Sunderland A.F.C.	1-1	Derby County	Sunderland
	Harris 35'	Report	23' McGovern	Stadium: Roker Park; Attendance: 18,818

30 March 1970 40	Derby County	4-1	Leeds United	Derby
	Wignall; McFarland; O’Hare; Carlin	Report	Kennedy	Stadium: Baseball Ground; Attendance: 41,011

4 April 1970 41	Derby County	2-0	Wolverhampton Wanderers	Derby
	Wignall 4'; Hennessey 13'	Report		Stadium: Baseball Ground; Attendance: 33,585

15 April 1970 42	Southampton F.C.	1-1	Derby County	Southampton
	Byrne 90'	Report	88' (o.g.) Byrne	Stadium: The Dell; Attendance: 21,229

=== Football League Cup ===
3 September 1969 2nd	Derby County	3-1	Hartlepool United

24 September 1969 3rd	Derby County	3-1	Hull City F.C.

14 October 1969 Eightfinals	Crystal Palace F.C.	1-1	Derby County

29 October 1969 Replay	Derby County	3-0	Crystal Palace F.C.

12 November 1969 Quarterfinals	Derby County	0-0	Manchester United

19 November 1969 Replay	Manchester United	1-0	Derby County	Greater Manchester
				Stadium: Old Trafford

=== FA Cup ===
3 January 1970 3rd	Preston North End	1-1	Derby County

7 January 1970 Replay	Derby County	4-1	Preston North End	Derby
				Stadium: Baseball Ground

24 January 1970 4th	Derby County	3-0	Sheffield United	Derby
				Stadium: Baseball Ground

7 February 1970 Eightfinals	Queen's Park Rangers	1-0	Derby County

== Statistics ==
=== Players statistics ===
Substitute appearances indicated in brackets

No.	Pos	Nat	Player	Total		First Division		League Cup		FA Cup	
No.	Pos	Nat	Player	Apps	Goals	Apps	Goals	Apps	Goals	Apps	Goals
	GK	(England) ENG	Les Green	52	-37	42	-37	6	0	4	0
	DF	(England) ENG	Ron Webster	47	0	38	0	6	0	3	0
	DF	(Scotland) SCO	Dave Mackay	49	2	39	2	6	0	4	0
	DF	(England) ENG	Roy McFarland	48	6	38	5	6	1	4	0
	DF	(England) ENG	John Robson	48	0	39	0	5	0	4	0
	MF	(Scotland) SCO	John McGovern	43	4	32+1	4	6	0	4	0
	MF	(Wales) WAL	Alan Durban	51	13	41	9	6	0	4	4
	MF	(England) ENG	Willie Carlin	50	8	40	6	6	2	4	0
	MF	(England) ENG	Alan Hinton	52	10	42	6	6	4	4	0
	FW	(England) ENG	Kevin Hector	51	16	41	12	6	2	4	2
	FW	(Scotland) SCO	John O'Hare	49	16	41	13	6	1	2	2
	GK	(England) ENG	Colin Boulton	0	0	0	0	0	0	0	0
	DF	(Wales) WAL	Terry Hennessey	12	2	12	2				
	DF	(England) ENG	Peter Daniel	10	0	8	0	1	0	1	0
	FW	(England) ENG	Frank Wignall	15	2	5+6	2	0+2	0	2	0
	DF	(England) ENG	John Richardson	5	0	4	0	1	0		
	DF	(England) ENG	Jim Walker	2	0	2	0				
	MF	(Northern Ireland) NIR	Arthur Stewart	2	0	1+1	0				
	DF	(England) ENG	Tony Rhodes	1	0	1	0				
	FW	(England) ENG	Barry Butlin	1	0	0	0	1	0		
	DF	(England) ENG	Pat Wright								

- Source: https://www.11v11.com/teams/derby-county/tab/players/season/1970/
