= 1970–71 Derby County F.C. season =

Derby County
1970–71 season
- Chairman: Sam Longson
- Manager: Brian Clough
- Stadium: Baseball Ground
- First Division: 9th
- FA Cup: 5th round
- League Cup: 4th round
- Top goalscorer: League: O'Hare (13); All: O'Hare (15)
Home colours	Away colours

The 1970–71 season was Derby County's 71st in the Football League and their 2nd consecutive season in the First Division. Also, they competed in FA Cup, Football League Cup and Watney Cup.

== Season summary ==
During summer, assistant Peter Taylor told Brian Clough about Scottish midfielder Archie Gemmill who had been considering signing for the reigning champions Everton. Clough saw him as a player who could pass well and had the type of energy that would drive an attack forward. Clough drove to Gemmill's house. When the player refused to sign for Derby (who had never won the league title), Clough told him that he was going to sleep outside in the car. "But my wife invited him in and he stayed the night," Gemmill said. Clough, eventually, got his man for £60,000 over fried eggs the following morning.In his fifth season as chairman, Sam Longson received a telegram by his fourth season manager Brian Clough informing him about the arrival of Central-back Colin Todd in February 1971 for a British record transfer fee for a defender of £175,000. Todd rejoined with Clough after played for his youth squad at Sunderland in 1965. When linked with the club, Brian Clough famously remarked "We're not signing Colin Todd, we can't afford him". He then signed him that same day. Also for this campaigned arrived Forward Jeff Bourne from Burton Albion.

The team finished on a disappointing 9th spot in First Division. However, during August the team clinched the inaugural Watney Cup after defeating Fulham F.C., Sheffield United and, on the Final in front of 32,000 fans the squad won with a 4-1 score against Manchester United.

== Squad ==
Note: Flags indicate national team as defined under FIFA eligibility rules; some limited exceptions apply. Players may hold more than one non-FIFA nationality.

Pos.	Nation	Player
GK	ENG	Colin Boulton
GK	ENG	Les Green
DF	ENG	Ron Webster
DF	ENG	Tony Rhodes
DF	ENG	Peter Daniel
DF	ENG	Roy McFarland
DF	WAL	Terry Hennessey
DF	ENG	John Richardson
DF	ENG	John Robson
DF	ENG	Colin Todd

Pos.	Nation	Player
DF	SCO	Dave Mackay (Captain)
MF	ENG	Willie Carlin
MF	WAL	Alan Durban
MF	SCO	John McGovern
MF	ENG	Alan Hinton
FW	ENG	Kevin Hector
FW	SCO	John O'Hare
FW	ENG	Frank Wignall
FW	ENG	Barry Butlin
FW	ENG	Jeff Bourne

=== Transfers ===
In
Pos.	Name	from	Type
MF	Archie Gemmill	Preston North End	£60,000
FW	Barry Butlin	Notts County	loan ended

Out
Pos.	Name	To	Type
MF	Arthur Stewart	Ballymena United F.C.	
DF	Pat Wright	Southend United	
DF	Jim Walker	Hartlepool United	loan

==== Winter ====
In
Pos.	Name	from	Type
DF	Colin Todd	Sunderland	£175,000
FW	Jeff Bourne	Burton Albion	

Out
Pos.	Name	To	Type

== Pre-season and friendlies ==
=== Watney Cup ===
1 August 1970 1	Fulham F.C.	3-5 (a.e.t.)	Derby County	Fulham
	Steve Earle 6'; Vic Halom 11'; Vic Halom 13'		2' O'Hare; 23'Hector; 69'Durban; 102'Hector; 106'Durban	Stadium: Craven Cottage; Attendance: 18,501; Referee: R Matthewson

5 August 1970 Semifinals	Derby County	1-0	Sheffield United	Derby
	McGovern 30'			Stadium: Baseball Ground; Attendance: 25,322; Referee: D Smith

8 August 1970 Final	Derby County	4-1	Manchester United	Derby
	McFarland 19'; Hinton 23'; Durban 35'; Mackay 72'		32'Best	Stadium: Baseball Ground; Attendance: 32,049; Referee: K Walker

== Competitions ==
=== First Division ===
==== League table ====
Pos	Team	Pld	W	D	L	GF	GA	GAv	Pts	Qualification or relegation
7	Southampton	42	17	12	13	56	44	1.273	46	Qualification for the UEFA Cup first round
8	Manchester United	42	16	11	15	65	66	0.985	43	Qualification for the Watney Cup (Note: Manchester United and West Bromwich Albion qualified for the Watney Cup as the two teams with the most goals that hadn't already qualified for a European competition.)
9	Derby County	42	16	10	16	56	54	1.037	42	
10	Coventry City	42	16	10	16	37	38	0.974	42	
11	Manchester City	42	12	17	13	47	42	1.119	41	

Source: World Football
Rules for classification: 1) Points; 2) Goal average; 3) Goals scored

==== Results by round ====
Round	1	2	3	4	5	6	7	8	9	10	11	12	13	14	15	16	17	18	19	20	21	22	23	24	25	26	27	28	29	30	31	32	33	34	35	36	37	38	39	40	41	42
Ground	A	A	H	H	A	H	H	A	H	A	H	A	H	H	A	H	A	H	A	H	A	A	H	H	A	A	H	A	H	A	H	A	A	H	H	A	A	H	H	A	A	H
Result	L	W	W	W	D	L	L	L	W	L	D	D	L	L	L	D	D	W	W	L	D	L	D	L	W	W	W	W	W	L	D	L	L	L	W	L	W	D	W	W	D	W
Position	18	8	5	5	4	-	8	13	11	14	13	13	14	18	20	18	19	14	16	15	16	18	16	15	15	15	13	14	13	14	14	14	13	13	13	12	12	12	10	9	8	9

Source: Competitive matches
A = Away; H = Home; W = Win; D = Draw; L = Loss; = Leader, Qualification to 1971–72 European Cup; = Qualification to 1971–72 UEFA Cup; = Relegation to 1971–72 Second Division; c = Qualification for the Watney Cup

==== Matches ====
- source: https://www.11v11.com/teams/derby-county/tab/matches/season/1971/

15 August 1970 1	Chelsea F.C.	2-1	Derby County	Fulham
	Hutchinson 74', 84'		25' O’Hare	Stadium: Stamford Bridge; Attendance: 46,969

19 August 1970 2	Wolverhampton	2-4	Derby County	Wolverhampton
	Curran 19'; Dougan 29'		15', 31' McGovern; 21' Durban; 23' O’Hare	Stadium: Molineux Stadium; Attendance: 29,910

22 August 1970 3	Derby County	2-0	Stoke City	Derby
	Hinton 19' (pen.); Wignall 47'			Stadium: Baseball Ground; Attendance: 35,461

26 August 1970 4	Derby County	2-0	Ipswich Town	Derby
	Harper 3' (o.g.); Hector 23'			Stadium: Baseball Ground; Attendance: 30,869

29 August 1970 5	Huddersfield Town	0-0	Derby County	Huddersfield
				Stadium: Leeds Road; Attendance: 27,997

2 September 1970 6	Derby County	3-4	Coventry City	Derby
	Hinton 13'; McGovern 62'; Hector 8'		88' Carr; 31' Clements; 28' Martin; 54' Martin	Stadium: Baseball Ground; Attendance: 31,621; Referee: R Capey

5 September 1970 7	Derby County	1-2	Newcastle United	Derby
	O’Hare 40'		4' Dyson; 14' Young	Stadium: Baseball Ground; Attendance: 30,466

12 September 1970 8	Southampton F.C.	4-0	Derby County	Southampton
	Davies 34', 52'; Channon 56', 89'			Stadium: The Dell; Attendance: 19,429

19 September 1970 9	Derby County	1-0	Burnley F.C.	Derby
	Hinton 5'			Stadium: Baseball Ground; Attendance: 26,749

26 September 1970 10	West Bromwich Albion	2-1	Derby County	West Bromwich
	McVitie 22'; Brown 73'		46' O’Hare	Stadium: The Hawthorns; Attendance: 31,437

3 October 1970 11	Derby County	1-1	Tottenham Hotspur	Derby
	Hinton 81' (pen.)		47' Peters	Stadium: Baseball Ground; Attendance: 36,007

10 October 1970 12	Everton F.C.	1-1	Derby County	Walton
	Morrissey 23'		48' McGovern	Stadium: Goodison Park; Attendance: 46,214

17 October 1970 13	Derby County	1-2	Chelsea F.C.	Derby
	O’Hare 3'		26', 57' Weller	Stadium: Baseball Ground; Attendance: 35,166

24 October 1970 14	Derby County	0-2	Leeds United	Derby
			53' Clarke; 65' Lorimer	Stadium: Baseball Ground; Attendance: 32,797

31 October 1970 15	Arsenal F.C.	2-0	Derby County	Highbury
	Kelly 35'; Radford 66'			Stadium: Highbury Stadium; Attendance: 43,023

7 November 1970 16	Derby County	0-0	Liverpool F.C.	Derby
				Stadium: Baseball Ground; Attendance: 33,004

14 November 1970 17	Manchester City	1-1	Derby County	Moss Side
	Bell 77'		24' O’Hare	Stadium: Maine Road; Attendance: 31,817

21 November 1970 18	Derby County	2-0	Blackpool F.C.	Derby
	Hector 39'; McFarland 59'			Stadium: Baseball Ground; Attendance: 28,237

28 November 1970 19	Nottingham Forest	2-4	Derby County	West Bridgford
	Chapman 8'; Storey-Moore 32'		26' Gemmill; 55' O’Hare; 59' Wignall 72' McGovern	Stadium: The City Ground; Attendance: 30,539

5 December 1970 20	Derby County	2-4	West Ham United	Derby
	Wignall 8'; Durban 26'		16' Greaves; 19' Brooking; 71' Best; 88' Best	Stadium: Baseball Ground; Attendance: 30,806

12 December 1970 21	Crystal Palace F.C.	0-0	Derby County	Selhurst
				Stadium: Selhurst Park; Attendance: 24,418

19 December 1970 22	Stoke City	1-0	Derby County	Stoke-on-Trent
	Burrows 60'			Stadium: Victoria Ground; Attendance: 21,906

26 December 1970 23	Derby County	4-4	Manchester United	Derby
	MacKay 2'; Wignall 21'; Hector 67'; Gemill 70'		74' Kidd; 55' Law; 59' Law; 57' Best	Stadium: Baseball Ground; Attendance: 34,068
Note: Les Green made his final appearance before moving to Durban City in August 1971.

9 January 1971 24	Derby County	1-2	Wolverhampton	Derby
	Gemmill 78' (pen.)		2' Shaw; 89' Gould	Stadium: Baseball Ground; Attendance: 34,243

16 January 1971 25	Ipswich Town	0-1	Derby County	Ipswich
			56' O’Hare	Stadium: Portman Road; Attendance: 20,231

6 February 1971 26	West Ham United	1-4	Derby County	Upton Park
	Eustace 48'		7' Hector; 19' Hector; 29' Hinton; 67' Hinton	Stadium: Boleyn Ground; Attendance: 26,606

17 February 1971 27	Derby County	1-0	Crystal Palace F.C.	Derby
	Mackay 76'			Stadium: Baseball Ground; Attendance: 25,521

20 February 1971 28	Blackpool F.C.	0-1	Derby County	Blackpool
			24' O’Hare	Stadium: Bloomfield Road; Attendance: 17,892

27 February 1971 29	Derby County	2-0	Arsenal F.C.	Derby
	McFarland 31'; Hector 50'			Stadium: Baseball Ground; Attendance: 35,875
Note: Colin Todd made his debut after moving from Sunderland this month.

6 March 1971 30	Leeds United	1-0	Derby County	Leeds
	Lorimer 77'			Stadium: Elland Road; Attendance: 36,467

13 March 1971 31	Derby County	0-0	Manchester City	Derby
				Stadium: Baseball Ground; Attendance: 31,987

20 March 1971 32	Liverpool F.C.	2-0	Derby County	Anfield
	Mackay 42' (o.g.); Lawler 88'			Stadium: Anfield; Attendance: 40,990

27 March 1971 33	Newcastle United	3-1	Derby County	Newcastle upon Tyne
	Mackay 1' (o.g.); Webster 21' (o.g.); Foggon 55'		89' Hector	Stadium: St James' Park; Attendance: 26,026

31 March 1971 34	Derby County	1-2	Nottingham Forest	Derby
	Hector 90'		20' Richardson; 81' Storey-Moore	Stadium: Baseball Ground; Attendance: 34,857

3 April 1971 35	Derby County	3-2	Huddersfield Town	Derby
	Hinton 14' (pen.), 67'; Hector 16'		Clarke 38'; Ellam 39'	Stadium: Baseball Ground; Attendance: 24,113

7 April 1971 36	Tottenham Hotspur	2-1	Derby County	Tottenham
	Chivers; Pearce		Hinton	Stadium: White Hart Lane; Attendance: 25,627
Note: John Richardson made his final appearance before moving to Notts County in July.

10 April 1971 37	Manchester United	1-2	Derby County	Greater Manchester
	Law 72'		37', 50' O’Hare	Stadium: Old Trafford; Attendance: 45,691

12 Apr 1971 38	Derby County	0-0	Southampton F.C.	Derby
				Stadium: Baseball Ground; Attendance: 26,217

17 Apr 1971 39	Derby County	3-1	Everton F.C.	Derby
	Hector 29'; O’Hare 49', 51'		75' Whittle	Stadium: Baseball Ground; Attendance: 28,793

24 Apr 1971 40	Burnley F.C.	1-2	Derby County	Burnley
	Casper 28'		52' Durban; 79' McGovern	Stadium: Turf Moor; Attendance: 10,349

27 Apr 1971 41	Coventry City	0-0	Derby County	Coventry
				Stadium: Highfield Road; Attendance: 22,051

1 May 1971 42	Derby County	2-0	West Bromwich Albion	Derby
	Durban 27'; Hinton 60'			Stadium: Baseball Ground; Attendance: 33,651

=== FA Cup ===
2 January 1971 3rd round	Chester F.C.	1-2	Derby County	Chester
	Keith Webber 84'		25' Wignall; 64' Gemmill	Stadium: Sealand Road; Attendance: 15,882

23 January 1971 4th round	Derby County	2-1	Wolverhampton Wanderers	Derby
	Alan Hinton 27' (pen.); John O'Hare 89'		80' John Richards	Stadium: Baseball Ground; Attendance: 40,576

13 February 1971 5th round	Everton F.C.	1-0	Derby County	Liverpool
	David Johnson 43'			Stadium: Goodison Park; Attendance: 53,490

=== Football League Cup ===
8 September 1970 Second round	Derby County	3-1	Halifax Town	Derby
	Alan Durban 19', 68'; Kevin Hector 45'		26' Phil McCarthy	Stadium: Baseball Ground; Attendance: 20,029; Referee: P Partridge

7 October 1970 Third round	Derby County	4-2	Millwall F.C.	Derby
	Dave Mackay; Alan Hinton (pen.); John McGovern; John O'Hare		Derek Possee; Gordon Bolland	Stadium: Baseball Ground; Attendance: 25,537

27 October 1970 Fourth round	Coventry City	1-0	Derby County	Coventry
	Neil Martin 59'			Stadium: Highfield Road; Attendance: 26,557; Referee: C Thomas

== Statistics ==
=== Players statistics ===
Substitute appearances indicated in brackets

No.	Pos	Nat	Player	Total		First Division		League Cup		FA Cup	
No.	Pos	Nat	Player	Apps	Goals	Apps	Goals	Apps	Goals	Apps	Goals
	GK	(England) ENG	Colin Boulton	22	0	19	0	3	0	0	0
	DF	(England) ENG	Ron Webster	41	0	34+1	0	3	0	3	0
	DF	(Scotland) SCO	Dave Mackay	47	3	42	2	3	0	2	1
	DF	(England) ENG	Roy McFarland	41	2	35	2	3	0	3	0
	DF	(England) ENG	John Robson	40	0	34+1	0	2	0	3	0
	MF	(Scotland) SCO	John McGovern	39	7	32+2	6	3	0	2	1
	MF	(Wales) WAL	Alan Durban	32	6	26+2	4	2	0	2	2
	MF	(Scotland) SCO	Archie Gemmill	34	4	31	3	3	1		
	MF	(England) ENG	Alan Hinton	39	12	34	10	2	1	3	1
	FW	(England) ENG	Kevin Hector	48	12	42	11	3	0	3	1
	FW	(Scotland) SCO	John O'Hare	48	15	42	13	3	1	3	1
	GK	(England) ENG	Les Green	26	0	23	0	0	0	3	0
	DF	(England) ENG	Colin Todd	14	0	14	0				
	MF	(England) ENG	Willie Carlin	15	0	13	0	0	0	2	0
	DF	(Wales) WAL	Terry Hennessey	14	0	12	0	1	0	1	0
	FW	(England) ENG	Frank Wignall	20	5	10+7	4	1	1	2	0
	DF	(England) ENG	John Richardson	8	0	8	0				
	DF	(England) ENG	Peter Daniel	6	1	4	1	1	0	0+1	0
	DF	(England) ENG	Tony Rhodes	4	0	3	0	0	0	1	0
	FW	(England) ENG	Jeff Bourne	2	0	2	0				
	FW	(England) ENG	Barry Butlin	1	0	1	0				
	DF	(England) ENG	Jim Walker	1	0	1	0				

- Source: https://www.11v11.com/teams/derby-county/tab/players/season/1971/
