= Tony Rhodes =

English footballer (1946–2024)

- Rhodes in 1971

Personal information
- Full name: John Anthony Rhodes
- Date of birth: 17 September 1946
- Place of birth: Dover, Kent, England
- Date of death: 28 December 2024 (aged 78)
- Place of death: Halifax, West Yorkshire, England
- Position: Centre-back

Youth career
- ???–1963: Derby County

Senior career*
| Years | Team | Apps | (Gls) |
| 1963–1970 | Derby County | | |
| 1970–1976 | Halifax Town | | |
| 1976–1977 | Southport | 9 | (0) |
| 1977–1978 | Burton Albion | | |
- * Club domestic league appearances and goals

John Anthony Rhodes (17 September 1946 – 28 December 2024) was an English footballer. He played as a centre-back for Derby County and Halifax Town throughout the 1960s and the 1970s.

== Career as a player ==
Rhodes was born on 17 September 1946. He began his career within the youth ranks of Derby County His opportunities within the club would remain limited due to players such as Ron Webster and Roy McFarland as despite going professional in November 1963, he wouldn't make his official debut until the annual derby with Swansea City in 1965 during the 1964–65 Second Division. He would later go on a four-game tour in Czechoslovakia alongside several other younger players of the club. He would later become the captain of the Derby reserve defense that had begun to face ever increasing pressure. He would get his second opportunity to play a full game when McFarland was injured on 23 August 1969 in a home game against Stoke City. He would continue to make more appearances within the next few months as he would lead the defense during a 0–2 away win against West Bromwich Albion on 30 August. For the remainder of the 1969–70 season, he would play as a reserve for Frank Wignall. By the end of the season, he would only make three appearances with two of these being for the 1969–70 Football League. He would make his first appearance for the 1970–71 season on 26 September 1970. In the few times he had the opportunity to play, he was primarily known for man-marking more dangerous players such as when he would do so with Jeff Astle in a 2–1 loss against West Bromwich Albion in an away match.

Around the same season, George Kirby was looking for a leading centre-back as he would pay up to £7,000 for Third Division club Halifax Town as he would play for the club for the rest of the season. Despite Rhodes' signing being considered to be a good decision by Kirby, the 1970–71 season for the club was overall considered middling due to the club narrowly missing out on promotion. During the following season, he would continue to make several appearances although he would be temporarily unavailable due to a pulled stomach muscle. He predominantly played with club captain John Pickering throughout his tenure with the club within central defense. He was also known for his commanding and authoritative personality as he would be one of the leading figures to have Halifax narrowly escape relegation under manager George Mulhall. He would continue to experience consistent participation with the club outside of a period in which he couldn't participate due to car problems in April 1974. He would be the only Halifax defender to return for the 1974–75 season as the club had begun seeking players that had hailed from stronger clubs. During his last season with the club, he would score an own goal whilst trying to deflect a free kick from Irish forward Pat Morrissey during a match against Aldershot on 27 April 1976. His last season would ultimately be a mixed bag as despite being named player of the year, the end of the season would see Halifax be relegated from the Third Division.

Following the season, Southport manager Ray Henderson had been seeking the now captain Rhodes to play for the Sandgrounders but there would be initial disputes over his transfer fee that would later initially cancel the deal. However, the deal would later be signed following further negotiations between the two clubs with Rhodes transferring on a fee of £2.000. However, his new career with the club would be hampered by injuries as well as a general loss in form. This would result in Rhodes playing as a reserve throughout the season. In a retrospective, Rhodes would admit to regretting the transfer, citing it as the catalyst behind his declining career. He began to descend into non-league play as he was then transferred to Burton Albion where the club would have a poor performance that season due to similar injuries as well as a general lack of availability with this being his final season as a player.

== Later life ==
Rhodes briefly had a managerial career for the Oldham U-14 team in the 1979–80 season. He later played cricket for Halifax based club RAFA before returning to Derbyshire as a postman and warehouse manager. He died on 28 December 2024 at Range Bank, Halifax.
