= John McGovern (footballer, born 1949) =

Scottish footballer and manager

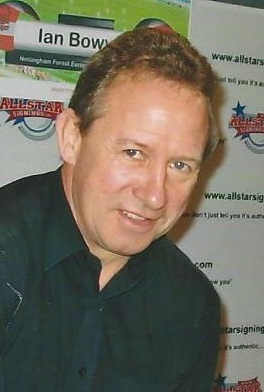
- McGovern in 2007

Personal information
- Full name: John Prescott McGovern
- Date of birth: 28 October 1949 (age 77)
- Place of birth: Montrose, Scotland
- Height: 1.77 m (5 ft 10 in)
- Position: Midfielder

Senior career*
Years	Team	Apps	(Gls)
1965–1968	Hartlepool (Note: Hartlepools United was renamed Hartlepool ahead of the 1968–69 season.)	72	(5)
1968–1974	Derby County	190	(16)
1974	Leeds United	4	(0)
1975–1982	Nottingham Forest	253	(6)
1982–1985	Bolton Wanderers	16	(0)
Total		535	(27)

International career
1972–1973	Scotland U23	2	(0)

Managerial career
- 1982–1985: Bolton Wanderers
- 1990–1991: Chorley
- 1994–1996: Rotherham United
- 1997–1998: Woking
- 2000–2003: Ilkeston Town
- * Club domestic league appearances and goals

John Prescott McGovern (born 28 October 1949) is a Scottish former association football midfielder and manager. McGovern is most famous for captaining the Nottingham Forest side that won the European Cup twice under the management of Brian Clough, whom he played under at four clubs, and Peter Taylor.

At the age of 19 he became the youngest player to play in all four divisions of the Football League. During his playing career he won promotion with Hartlepools United / Hartlepool, Derby County and Nottingham Forest. He won titles as English League champions with both Derby and Forest. At Forest he also won the European Super Cup, two Football League Cups, the FA Charity Shield and the Anglo-Scottish Cup. He was Forest's club captain throughout this period of success.

A hard working central midfield team-player, McGovern passed the ball comfortably with either foot. John Robertson said, "As far as I'm concerned John McGovern is what epitomises what every good side needs." McGovern played over 650 senior first team games during his playing career spanning 19 seasons.

McGovern won two Scottish under-23 caps. He is one of only two Scots players to win UEFA's premier club trophy to never win a full international cap. He was a 2017 Scottish Football Hall of Fame inductee.

McGovern has player-managed Bolton Wanderers and joint-managed Rotherham United with Archie Gemmill, with whom he won the Football League Trophy. He has served as assistant manager for Plymouth Argyle and Hull City. He has also worked in media punditry.

== Early years ==
McGovern was born in Montrose, Angus, in north east Scotland. He lived in Montrose until he was seven years old before moving to Hartlepool when his family relocated when his father needed to find work. McGovern's father subsequently moving to work on the Kariba Dam meant he and McGovern would never see each other again. McGovern's father was killed in an accident on the last day of his 2 years working in Africa before he was scheduled to return home. His father died when McGovern was aged 11. The young McGovern attended Henry Smith's Grammar School, a rugby-playing school. However, during school holidays his mother sent him to stay with his grandmother in Bo'ness. It was in Bo'ness that McGovern started to play football with a band of friends he made there. Despite being captain of the school teams at rugby and cricket, football became his preferred sport. Back in Hartlepool he played for his first team when he was 15. His football heroes were both strikers, Denis Law and Jimmy Greaves, and as a boy McGovern also wanted to become a striker. Central Park FC then sent him for a trial with local senior club, Hartlepool United.

== Career ==
=== Hartlepools United / Hartlepool ===
The young McGovern initially wanted to play as a striker for the glory that came with scoring goals but was unsuited to that role. He then played as a winger. He began his senior career in English football's fourth tier with local club Hartlepools United in 1965–66. 'Pools were under the management of Brian Clough and Peter Taylor. It was Taylor who advocated they get McGovern on the books. His senior debut was aged 16 on 21 May 1966 in a 1–1 draw v Bradford City in Pools' last home league game of the season. He became a first team regular the season after. On 3 September 1966, he signed a pro contract on apprentice terms. In the 1966–67 season the club finished on a decent 8th spot, however, the following campaign 1967/68, Hartlepool finished third earning promotion to the Third Division. His last game for Pools was on 6 September 1968 in a 2–1 defeat at Bristol Rovers. After playing six games in that 1968/69 season he moved up a division by transferring to Derby County.

=== Derby County ===
Clough and Taylor moved to Derby County in May 1967. They signed 18-year old McGovern to Derby for a fee of £7,500 in September 1968. For the 1968–69 season his mother and brother relocated with him to Derby (his sister had already moved to California). Shortly after arriving at Derby, on 2 October 1968 while in the reserves he watched the first team 3-1 replay win v Chelsea in the 1968–69 Football League Cup. On seeing Dave Mackay play, McGovern realised the level he had been playing at was a long way short of what was needed to be a footballer. He responded with dedication and hard work. His first team debut arrived in a game for which there was an opening to play on the right side of midfield. It was at Derby during the 1969–70 season that Taylor then moved McGovern to central midfield to capitalise on McGovern's playing strengths of vision and being able to pass and control the ball with both feet. He allied this by learning how to tackle. By January 1969 he had established himself in the Derby side that won promotion to the First Division at the end of his first season there. Within an 18-month period and by the age of 19 he had played in all four divisions of the Football League.

After a disappointing 1970–71 season, Liverpool contesting a 1971–72 four-way league title fight lost 1–0 in their penultimate game to McGovern's 62nd-minute goal at Derby County. Derby had now completed their fixtures with that win. On Monday 8 May 1972, Leeds' 2–1 loss at Wolverhampton Wanderers gave Liverpool their bite at the title. Needing to win the same evening if Leeds lost, Liverpool drew 0–0 at Arsenal with Shankly furious an 88th minute Toshack goal was disallowed. Derby stayed top. to win that 1971–72 First Division title. McGovern played in 40 matches in that league winning campaign scoring 3 goals. He was 22 when they lifted the title. In the following 1972–73 season, during the European Cup McGovern scored in a 3–0 home win against Benfica. Derby were eliminated in the semi-finals in controversial circumstances to Juventus.

Clough resigned on 15 October 1973 in his ongoing dispute with Derby Chairman Sam Longson leading to uproar among Derby fans. Longson appointed another crowd favourite as manager, Dave Mackay. The saga continued so MacKay decided to bring matters to a head. Mackay gave the players a piece of paper stating those who wanted to play for him should sign it. McGovern was first to sign and when challenged by other players he said "I want to play football. I'm not interested in politics." Calm was restored and Derby finished the 1973–74 season third in the league behind Liverpool and Leeds.

His final Derby first team game was at Manchester City on 6 February 1974. In all competitions he played in 227 first team games (including four as a substitute), scoring 20 goals. Mackay gave McGovern's regular starting place to the more attack minded Bruce Rioch.

=== Leeds United ===
During the 1973–74 season Clough had tried to sign McGovern for Brighton and Hove Albion but McGovern found the prospect of Third Division football unpalatable. Clough replaced Don Revie as Leeds manager in August 1974 and again made an approach for McGovern. Leeds paid £125,000 for the double transfer of McGovern (now aged 24) and John O'Hare. McGovern was not selected to play when Billy Bremner and Johnny Giles were available. McGovern made four first team appearances all when Bremner was suspended after his sending off for fighting in the 1974 FA Charity Shield with Kevin Keegan. Leeds won one, drew two and lost one of McGovern's four games in August and September 1974. He otherwise played no higher than the reserves in his seven months at Elland Road. He later said of his time at Leeds:

"When I arrived at Elland Road after leaving Derby County, I found out I was unwanted by anybody at the club, and it was a very difficult time for me. And I spent about six months at Leeds not being involved in the squad, and even in those days they used to have the players names on the back of the squad tracksuits. Well I was there six months and I never got a track suit with my name on the back of it. I think that was a big hint from the club that I didn't really belong there."

Clough's reign was only 44 days but even after his departure, McGovern, O'Hare and trainer Jimmy Gordon were tarred with being part of the Clough regime. McGovern declined offers Leeds accepted for him to join Carlisle United and Norwich City. Clough did not forget any of the three men and soon returned to take all three in early 1975 to his new club, Nottingham Forest.

=== Nottingham Forest ===
Brian Clough became manager of Nottingham Forest on 6 January 1975 twelve weeks after the end of his 44-day tenure as manager of Leeds United. Clough brought Jimmy Gordon to be his club trainer as Gordon had been for him at Derby County and Leeds United. McGovern was aged 25 at the time.

Clough signed McGovern and O'Hare in February with McGovern debuting on 22 February 1975 in a 0–0 home league draw v Cardiff City. Forest were 13th in English football's second tier when Clough joined. They finished that season 16th. The season after Forest finished eighth in Clough's 1975–76 Football League first full season in charge. It was in this season McGovern became long standing club captain taking over from a game in which Bob 'Sammy' Chapman and Liam O'Kane were both injured.

Peter Taylor on 16 July 1976 rejoined Clough becoming his Assistant Manager as he had been when winning the league at Derby. Taylor included being the club's talent spotter in his role. After assessing the players Taylor told Clough "that was a feat by you to finish eighth in the Second Division because some of them are only Third Division players".

Together Clough and Taylor took Forest to new heights with McGovern the club captain throughout the success the two brought to Forest. Their first trophy at Forest was the 1976–77 Anglo-Scottish Cup. Forest beat Orient 5–1 on aggregate in the two-legged final played in December 1976. Clough valued winning a derided trophy as the club's first silverware since 1959. He said, "Those who said it was a nothing trophy were absolutely crackers. We'd won something, and it made all the difference."

On 7 May Alan Moore's own goal meant Forest in their last league game of the season beat Millwall 1–0 at the City Ground. This kept Forest in the third promotion spot in the league table and dependent on Bolton Wanderers dropping points in three games in hand in the fight for third place. On 14 May Kenny Hibbitt's goal from his rehearsed free kick routine with Willie Carr gave Wolves a 1–0 win at Bolton. McGovern later said Bolton's defeat reached the Forest team mid-air en route to an end of season break in Mallorca. Forest's third place promotion from the 1976–77 Football League Second Division was the fifth-lowest points tally of any promoted team in history, 52 (two points for a win in England until 1981).

Taylor secretly followed Kenny Burns concluding Burns's reputation as a hard drinker and gambler was exaggerated. Taylor sanctioned his £150,000 July signing. Burns become FWA Footballer of the Year in 1977–78 after being moved from centre-forward to centre-back. Forest started their return to the top league campaign with a 3–1 win at Everton. Three further wins in league and cup followed without conceding a goal. Then came five early September goals conceded in losing 3–0 at Arsenal and beating Wolves 3–2 at home. Peter Shilton then signed for a record fee for a goalkeeper of £325,000. Taylor reasoned: "Shilton wins you matches." 20 year old John Middleton was first team goalkeeper pre-Shilton. Middleton later in the month went in part exchange with £25,000 to Derby County for Archie Gemmill transferring to Forest to rejoin McGovern in midfield. Gemmill was another Scottish former 1972 Derby title winner bringing something to central midfield in which McGovern was deficient; pace.

Forest lost only three of their first 16 league games the last of which was at Leeds United on 19 November 1977. They lost only one further game all season, 11 March FA Cup sixth round defeat at West Bromwich Albion. Forest won the 1977–78 Football League seven-points ahead of runners-up Liverpool. Forest became one of the few teams (and the most recent team to date) to win the First Division title the season after winning promotion from the Second Division. This made Clough the third of four managers to win the English league championship with two different clubs. Forest conceded just 24 goals in 42 league games. They beat Liverpool 1–0 in the 1978 Football League Cup Final replay despite cup-tied Shilton, Gemmill and December signing David Needham missing out. Chris Woods chalked up two clean sheets in the final covering Shilton's league cup absence. McGovern missed the replay through injury meaning Burns lifted the trophy as deputising captain. Robertson's penalty was the only goal of the game.

Forest started season 1978–79 by beating Ipswich Town 5–0 for an FA Charity Shield record win. In the 1978–79 European Cup they were drawn to play the trophy winners of the two previous seasons, Liverpool. Home goals by Birtles and Colin Barrett put Forest through 2–0 on aggregate. McGovern opened the scoring in the second round 2–1 victory against AEK Athens. On 9 December 1978 Liverpool ended Forest's 42 match unbeaten league run dating back to the November the year before. The unbeaten run was the equivalent of a whole season surpassing the previous record of 35 games held by Burnley in 1920/21. The record stood until surpassed by Arsenal in August 2004 a month before Clough's death. Arsenal played 49 league games without defeat.

In February 1979 Taylor authorised the English game's first £1 million transfer signing Trevor Francis from Birmingham City. In the April European Cup semi final home first leg against 1. FC Köln Forest were two goals behind after 20 minutes. Forest scored three to edge ahead before Köln equalised to start the German second leg ahead on the away goals rule. Ian Bowyer's goal in Germany put Forest through. Günter Netzer asked afterwards, "Who is this McGovern? I have never heard of him, yet he ran the game." Forest beat Malmö 1–0 in Munich's Olympiastadion in the 1979 European Cup Final. Francis on his European debut scored with a back post header from Robertson's cross. When later interviewed for "My Forest Story" McGovern said when he lifted the European Cup the first time he was thinking of his father.

Forest beat Southampton in the final 3–2 to retain the League Cup. Birtles scored twice as did Woodcock once. Forest finished second in the 1978–79 Football League eight points behind Liverpool.

Forest declined to play in the home and away 1979 Intercontinental Cup against Paraguay's Club Olimpia. Forest beat F.C. Barcelona 2–1 on aggregate in the 1979 European Super Cup in January & February 1980. Charlie George scored the only goal in the home first leg. Burns scored an equaliser in the return in Spain. In the 1979–80 Football League Cup Forest reached a third successive final. A defensive mix up between Needham and Shilton let Wolves' Andy Gray tap in to an empty net. Forest passed up numerous chances losing 1–0. In the 1979–80 European Cup quarter final Forest won 3–1 at Dinamo Berlin to overturn a 1–0 home defeat. In the semi-final they beat AFC Ajax 2–1 on aggregate. They beat Hamburg 1–0 in the 1980 European Cup Final at Madrid's Santiago Bernabéu Stadium to retain the trophy. Robertson scored after exchanging passes with Birtles. Forest finished fifth in the 1979–80 Football League.

In the 1980–81 European Cup first round Forest lost 2–0 on aggregate to 1–0 home and away defeats by CSKA Sofia. McGovern subsequently said the double defeat by CSKA affected the team's self-confidence in that they had lost out to modestly talented opponents. Forest lost the 1980 European Super Cup on away goals after a 2–2 aggregate draw against Valencia C.F. Bowyer scored both Forest goals in the home first leg. On 11 February 1981, Forest lost 1–0 in the 1980 Intercontinental Cup against Uruguayan side, Club Nacional de Football. The match was played for the first time at the neutral venue National Stadium in Tokyo before 62,000 fans.

The league and European Cup winning squad was broken up to capitalise on player sale value. Clough and Taylor both later said this was a mistake. The rebuilt side comprising youngsters and signings such as Ian Wallace, Raimondo Ponte and Justin Fashanu did not challenge for trophies. Taylor said in 1982, "For many weeks now I don't believe I've been doing justice to the partnership and I certainly haven't been doing justice to Nottingham Forest the way I felt. And consequently after a great deal of thought, there was no option. I wanted to take an early retirement. That's exactly what I've done." Jimmy Gordon retired and McGovern transferred in the same close season.

McGovern started 329 competitive games for Forest that combined with substitute appearances gave him 334 competitive first team appearances for Forest. 77 appearances in non-competitive first games gave him a total of 411 Nottingham Forest first team games.

=== Scotland ===
McGovern played twice for Scotland at under-23 level, both against Wales while at Derby County. The first was on 26 January 1972 in a 2–0 win at Pittodrie. He was substituted by Denis McQuade of Partick Thistle, who direct from a corner scored the second goal. McGovern's second and final international game was on 14 March 1973 at the Vetch Field in Swansea. He was again substituted this time by Pat McCluskey of Celtic as Scotland won 2–1.

McGovern and Ken McNaught are the only two Scottish players to win Europe's premier club trophy to never have gained a full international cap. He later said, "I would have walked up the M74 over broken glass to get one cap for Scotland. I just wish I'd have got one cap because that would have been the proudest moment of my life."

=== Bolton Wanderers ===
McGovern joined Bolton Wanderers as player-manager in July 1982. He initially made a total of 16 League appearances for Bolton before retiring as a player to focus on the demands of management. He remained there until January 1985 when he lost his job after a new chairman wanted to bring in his own manager.

=== Later career ===
He ended his playing days with non-league Horwich RMI. He was later assistant manager of Chorley and Plymouth Argyle before being appointed joint manager of Rotherham United for two years alongside Archie Gemmill in 1994. They beat Shrewsbury Town 2–1 in the 1996 Football League Trophy final. Another ex-Forest player, Nigel Jemson, scored both their goals.

McGovern was subsequently hired as manager of Woking and had a spell as assistant at Hull City before joining Ilkeston Town to replace Keith Alexander as manager in November 2000. He was sacked by the club in March of the following year after an eight-game winless run.

He has since worked as a club ambassador for Forest, as a pundit on Radio Nottingham and as an after dinner speaker.

== Style of play ==
Brian Clough said of him, "He never stopped going, never stopped running, and he was a reasonably intelligent young man." John Robertson said of McGovern, "As far as I'm concerned John McGovern is what epitomises what every good side needs."

A profile of the young McGovern on Sporting Heroes states, "John's ability to do the simple things well, allied to his work ethic and willingness to act as a man marker saw him return a series of solid displays; often against much older and experienced opponents."

The same article closes by stating of his time at Derby, "He scored twenty goals and at his best demonstrated ball control and passing skills of the highest level, a talent that frequently allowed others to shine."

== Legacy ==
McGovern was a 2017 inductee to the Scottish Football Hall of Fame. He said, "It is a fantastic feeling that I have to be inducted into the Scottish Hall of Fame. Although I may not sound Scottish having left there when I was seven-years-old, I am a proud Scotsman having been born and bred in Montrose and any honour that you get in football is very well received."

== Career statistics ==
=== As a player ===
Appearances and goals by club, season and competition
Club	Season	League			FA Cup		League Cup		Europe		Other (Note: Includes FA Charity Shield, Anglo-Scottish Cup, Football League Trophy, Watney Cup, Texaco Cup, European Super Cup and Intercontinental Cup.)		Total	
Club	Season	Division	Apps	Goals	Apps	Goals	Apps	Goals	Apps	Goals	Apps	Goals	Apps	Goals
Hartlepools United / Hartlepool	1965–66	Fourth Division	1	0	0	0	0	0	–		–		1	0
Hartlepools United / Hartlepool	1966–67	Fourth Division	33	1	1	0	0	0	—		—		34	1
Hartlepools United / Hartlepool	1967–68	Fourth Division	33	4	1	0	1	0	—		—		35	4
Hartlepools United / Hartlepool	1968–69	Third Division	5	0	0	0	1	2	—		—		6	2
Hartlepools United / Hartlepool	Total		72	5	2	0	2	2	—		—		76	7
Derby County	1968–69	Second Division	18	0	1	0	0	0	—		—		19	0
Derby County	1969–70	First Division	33	4	4	0	6	0	—		—		43	0
Derby County	1970–71	First Division	34	6	3	0	2	1	—		3	1	42	8
Derby County	1971–72	First Division	40	3	5	0	1	0	—		5	1	51	4
Derby County	1972–73	First Division	39	1	5	0	3	1	8	1	0	0	55	3
Derby County	1973–74	First Division	26	2	0	0	3	0	—		—		29	2
Derby County	Total		190	16	18	0	15	2	8	1	8	2	239	21
Leeds United	1974–75	First Division	4	0	0	0	0	0	0	0	0	0	4	0
Nottingham Forest	1974–75	Second Division	8	0	0	0	0	0	—		—		8	0
Nottingham Forest	1975–76	Second Division	41	0	2	0	4	1	—		—		47	1
Nottingham Forest	1976–77	Second Division	39	0	3	0	2	0	—		7	0	51	0
Nottingham Forest	1977–78	First Division	31	4	4	0	7	0	—		—		42	4
Nottingham Forest	1978–79	First Division	36	0	3	1	7	2	8	1	1	0	55	4
Nottingham Forest	1979–80	First Division	41	2	2	0	8	0	9	0	1	0	61	2
Nottingham Forest	1980–81	First Division	27	0	3	0	2	0	2	0	2	0	36	0
Nottingham Forest	1981–82	First Division	30	0	1	0	3	0	—		—		34	0
Nottingham Forest	Total		253	6	18	1	33	3	19	1	11	0	334	11
Bolton Wanderers	1982–83	Second Division	14	0	0	0	4	1	—		—		18	1
Bolton Wanderers	1983–84	Third Division	2	0	0	0	0	0	—		0	0	2	0
Bolton Wanderers	Total		16	0	0	0	4	1	—		0	0	20	1
Career total			535	27	38	1	54	8	27	2	19	2	674	40

=== As a manager ===
Team	From	To	Record				
Team	From	To	P	W	D	L	Win %
Bolton Wanderers	1 June 1982	7 January 1985	129	42	28	59	32.6
Rotherham United	14 September 1994	31 July 1996	94	36	31	27	38.3
Total			223	78	59	86	35.0

== Honours ==
=== As a player ===
Hartlepools United

- Football League Fourth Division promoted: 1967–68

Derby County

- Football League First Division: 1971–72
- Football League Second Division: 1968–69

Nottingham Forest

- Football League First Division: 1977–78
- Football League Cup: 1977–78, 1978–79; runner-up: 1979–80
- FA Charity Shield: 1978
- European Cup: 1978–79, 1979–80
- European Super Cup: 1979

=== As a manager ===
Rotherham United

- Football League Trophy: 1995–96
