= Chris Kirchner =

American entrepreneur

- Born: August 1987 (age 38–39); San Francisco, California
- Education: University of Kentucky
- Occupation: Entrepreneur
- Known for: Co-founder, Slync.io
- Criminal charges: Fraud
- Criminal penalty: 20 years in prison
- Criminal status: Incarcerated

Christopher Steven Kirchner (born August 1987) is an American entrepreneur and convicted fraudster. The co-founder and former CEO of logistics company Slync.io, he was convicted on fraud and money laundering charges in January 2024.

== Early life and education ==
Kirchner was born in San Francisco, California and studied international marketing at Butler University before moving on to study communications at the University of Kentucky, leaving in 2009 before graduating.

== Career ==
After leaving the University of Kentucky, he started Kirchner Entertainment, an advertising and entertainment company. He later took positions with tech supplier Best Buy until 2015 and then Lexington-based Turner Labels, where he met Raj Patel while working with a Salesforce contact.

In 2017, Kirchner and Patel co-founded the logistics firm Slync.io, where Kirchner served as the company's CEO. Investors in the business included Goldman Sachs and Blumberg Capital, with funding rounds totaling $80m, valuing the company at $240m.

In late 2021, Kirchner was also among several potential bidders for the then financially-troubled English association football club Derby County, publicly declaring his interest in November before withdrawing his bid on December 24, 2021. After a failed attempt to buy Championship rivals Preston North End, he renewed his interest in Derby County and was confirmed as preferred bidder on April 6, 2022. He withdrew his bid for the club in June 2022.

In July 2022, a Forbes investigation reported Kirchner had fired Slync.io executives after they raised questions about company funds; he was also facing a lawsuit for wrongful termination and claims of "fraudulent behavior". He was said to have told Slync.io's board that the business had generated close to $30 million in revenue in 2021, from about 20 customers, while the real figures were closer to $1 million from fewer than five customers. Kirchner was first suspended and then fired by Slync.io in August 2022 after making financial misrepresentations to the company board.

In October 2023, Slync.io went into liquidation, saying it could not continue to operate "due to its financial underperformance and Kirchner’s [alleged] fraud".

== Wire fraud and money laundering convictions ==
In February 2023, Kirchner's home in Westlake, Texas was raided by the FBI and he was charged with wire fraud for transferring $20 million in company funds to his personal bank account while employed at Slync. Leigha Simonton, the U.S. Attorney for the Northern District of Texas alleged Kirchner had used the money to fund a "lavish lifestyle", including a $16m private Gulfstream jet, a $495,000 luxury suite at a Dallas sports stadium, prestige cars including a Rolls-Royce, and membership of an exclusive Dallas-area golf club called the Vaquero.

In January 2024 a federal jury in Texas convicted Kirchner of four counts of wire fraud and a further seven counts of money laundering, defrauding investors of at least $25 million. He was sentenced to 20 years in prison and ordered to pay over $65m in restitution.
