= Jimmy Gordon (footballer, born 1915) =

Scottish footballer and coach

Personal information
- Date of birth: 23 October 1915
- Place of birth: Fauldhouse, Scotland
- Date of death: 29 August 1996 (aged 80)
- Place of death: Derby, England
- Height: 5 ft 6 1/2 in (1.69 m)
- Position: Wing half

Senior career*
Years	Team	Apps	(Gls)
1931–1935	Wishaw Juniors		
1935–1945	Newcastle United	144	(3)
1945–1954	Middlesbrough	253	(4)
Total		402	(7)

Managerial career
- 1973: Derby County (caretaker)
- * Club domestic league appearances and goals

James Gordon (23 October 1915 – 29 August 1996) was a Scottish football player and coach. A native of Fauldhouse, West Lothian, Gordon played for Newcastle United and Middlesbrough as a wing-half. He later worked as a coach under Brian Clough and Peter Taylor at Derby County and Nottingham Forest, and was assistant manager to Clough during his 44-day reign at Leeds United. In honour of his contribution, Gordon was allowed to lead out the Forest players at Wembley for the 1980 Football League Cup Final.

Gordon retired as a football coach in May 1981.

He was portrayed by Maurice Roëves in the 2009 film The Damned United, which focuses on Clough's management of Derby and Leeds.
