= Willie Carlin =

English footballer (1940–2024)

Personal information
- Full name: William Carlin
- Date of birth: 6 October 1940
- Place of birth: Liverpool, England
- Date of death: 10 June 2024 (aged 83)
- Height: 5 ft 4 in (1.63 m)
- Position: Midfielder

Youth career
- 1956–1958: Liverpool

Senior career*
Years	Team	Apps	(Gls)
1958–1962	Liverpool	1	(0)
1962–1964	Halifax Town	95	(32)
1964–1967	Carlisle United	93	(21)
1967–1968	Sheffield United	36	(3)
1968–1970	Derby County	89	(14)
1970–1971	Leicester City	31	(1)
1971–1973	Notts County	60	(2)
1973–1974	Cardiff City	22	(1)
- * Club domestic league appearances and goals

William Carlin (6 October 1940 – 10 June 2024) was an English professional footballer who played as a midfielder. During his career, he made over 400 appearances in the Football League, scoring 74 times. He began his career with his hometown club Liverpool, making one appearance for the club in 1959, before joining Halifax Town in 1962. He joined Carlisle United in 1964 and went on to make over 100 appearances in all competitions for the club, helping them win the Third Division in 1965.

After one season with Sheffield United, Carlin was persuaded to join Derby County by manager Brian Clough and went on to play a pivotal role in the Rams Second Division title winning side during the 1968–69 season and played one season in the First Division for the club. He later finished his career with spells at Leicester City, Notts County and Cardiff City. Standing at five foot and four inches and weighing less than 10 stone, Carlin became well known for his diminutive size and his tenacity on the pitch, being described by Brian Clough as "a belligerent, aggressive little Scouser".

== Career ==
Having represented England at schoolboy level, Carlin began at his hometown club, and the club he supported, Liverpool, joining the side in 1956 before signing a professional contract two years later in May 1958. The following season, Carlin was handed his professional debut for the club in the Second Division at the age of 19, playing in a 2–2 draw with Brighton & Hove Albion on 10 October 1959. He remained at Anfield until 1962 but did not make any further appearances for the club and was sold to Division Three side Halifax Town in August 1962 for a fee of £1,500. At Halifax, Carlin was relegated for the first time in his career during his first season at the club, dropping into the Fourth Division, but made his name as a midfield schemer before joining Carlisle United in 1964 for a fee of £10,000. After initially clashing with coach Dick Young, Carlin soon settled with the Cumbrians and later credited Young with "making a real man of me".

He helped Carlisle win promotion to the Second Division, despite suffering a broken leg during the 1965–66 season, before joining Sheffield United in 1967 for £40,000, signing a five-year contract with the Blades, where he spent one season before attracting the interest of Derby County, whose manager Brian Clough had followed his progress for several years and had previously attempted to buy Carlin during his time with Carlisle but had been charged by the Football Association after making an illegal approach to him. When Carlisle had sold Carlin to Sheffield United, Clough had furiously stated "Carlisle have sold a player for a certain fee when [...] we were prepared to top it". Carlin initially refused to meet Clough to discuss a transfer but was convinced to meet Clough by Sheffield United manager Arthur Rowley, who told Carlin that it would be "rude" to ignore the meeting. Carlin eventually accepted the move after his wife Marie declared her wish to move away from Sheffield. Carlin travelled to Derby the following day and the transfer was completed for a fee of £63,000. Rowley had been unimpressed with Carlin during his time in charge and believed he had "got one over" on Clough having described Carlin as "an over-aggressive and slow midfielder who couldn't keep his mouth shut".

Carlin made his debut for the Rams in a 2–2 draw with Hull City, scoring one of his side's goals. After winning another promotion, scoring the goal that sealed promotion in the 1968–69 season, Carlin helped Derby establish themselves as a force in the First Division under Brian Clough. After spells playing for Leicester City and Notts County, he moved to Cardiff City in November 1973, being brought in by his former Leicester boss Frank O'Farrell. He made his debut during a 1–0 victory over Bolton Wanderers and was instrumental in helping the club avoid relegation, his final professional appearance coming in the final game of the season against Crystal Palace that decided which of the two sides would be relegated, before deciding to retire at the end of the season.

== Later life ==
After retiring from football, Carlin ran a bar in Mallorca, Spain. He retired to the area of Allestree in Derby. In April 2011, Carlin's house was targeted by burglars who broke into his home using a spade and stole his winners medal from the 1968–69 season with Derby County and the gold commemorative bracelet that was awarded to each player. He died on 10 June 2024, at the age of 83.

== Honours ==
Carlisle United

- Football League Third Division: 1964–65

Derby County

- Football League Second Division: 1968–69
