= Ron Webster =

English footballer

Personal information
- Date of birth: 21 June 1943 (age 83)
- Place of birth: Belper, Derbyshire, England
- Position: Defender

Senior career*
| Years | Team | Apps | (Gls) |
| 1960–1978 | Derby County | 455 | (7) |
| 1976 | → Minnesota Kicks (loan) | 20 | (1) |
| 1978 | →Minnesota Kicks (loan) | 7 | (0) |
- * Club domestic league appearances and goals

Ron Webster (born 21 June 1943, in Belper) is an English former association football player, who spent nearly all his career playing for his local team Derby County. Webster played at right back, and was always a fans' favourite because of his hard tackles and effort. Seth Johnson, a recent ex-Derby player, was compared to him for his hard-working attitude on the pitch. He is rated by many people as being one of the most loyal Derby County players ever for his services and contribution to the club.

He played 455 league games for Derby, which is the second-highest in Derby County's history, (only Kevin Hector played more), from 1960 to 1978, scoring seven times. Ron was part of the Brian Clough and Peter Taylor era at Derby, and then the just as successful Dave Mackay era. Webster was an integral part of a near-unbeatable defence. Webster retired in 1977 after his last game (a 1–1 draw with Chelsea). Webster stayed on at Derby as coach, but is now retired.

On 30 March 2009, he was voted the greatest right back in Derby County history.
