= Donald MacKintosh =

Donald MacKintosh or Mackintosh may refer to:

- Donald MacKintosh (VC) (1896–1917), Scottish recipient of the Victoria Cross
- Donald Mackintosh (bishop) (1876–1943), Roman Catholic Archbishop of Glasgow
- Donald Mackintosh (politician) (1840–1932), farmer and member of the Queensland Legislative Assembly
- Donald Mackintosh (shooter) (1866–1951), Australian sports shooter
- Donald James MacKintosh (1862–1947), Scottish physician, soldier and public health expert
