= Robert MacHardy =

19th-century Scottish composer, conductor and music educator

Robert Machardy
- Born: Robert McHardy; 10 September 1848; Edinburgh
- Died: 7 August 1921 (aged 72); Whitehill, Strathaven
- Resting place: Warriston Cemetery Edinburgh
- Other name: Machardy
- Occupations: Composer, Conductor, Musician, Teacher/Examiner
- Spouse: Baroness Felice Wielobycki (married 1886)

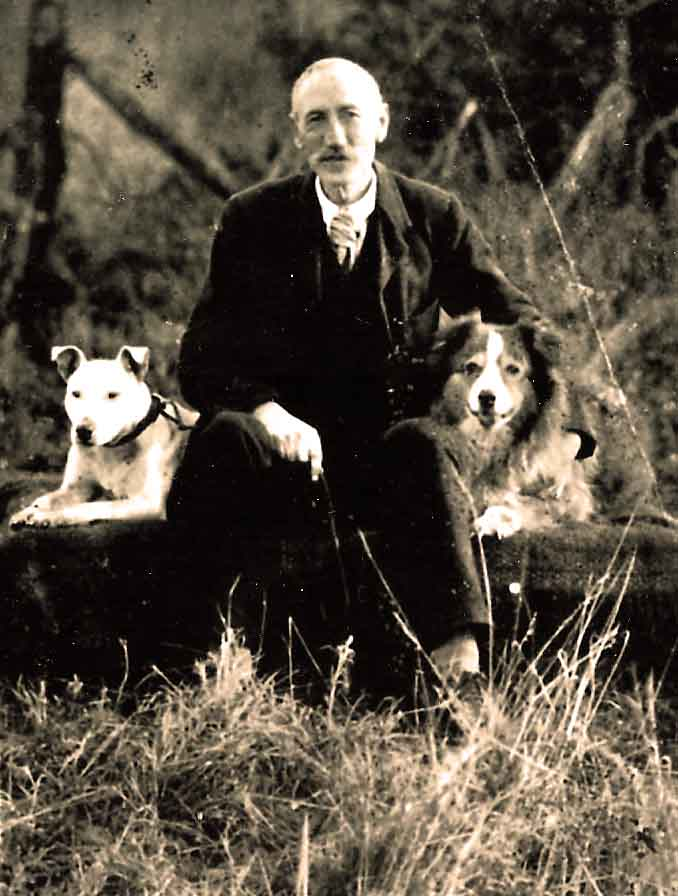
Robert Machardy with his dogs

Robert Machardy LL.D né McHardy (10 September 1848 – 8 July 1921) was a 19th-century Scottish composer, conductor, and music educator. A Fellow of the National College of Music, he composed over a hundred works, including operas, cantatas, and oratorios, many of which drew inspiration from Scottish folklore and melodies. Though successful in the 1880s and 1890s, his work being commissioned and performed by some of the most celebrated opera singers of the time, his music ultimately fell into obscurity. In later life, he focused on music examination, teaching, and conducting choral and operatic societies in East Lothian and Lanarkshire.

== Early life and education ==
Robert McHardy, later adopting the spelling "Machardy," was born in Edinburgh, Scotland, to Robert McHardy and Elizabeth McDonald. His brother, James Marius Patrick McHardy, also pursued a career as a composer and conductor. During his youth, the McHardy family briefly emigrated to Australia, returning to Edinburgh around 1856. Machardy attended Edinburgh High School and the University of Edinburgh, where he later became the organist at one of the city's cathedrals. He reportedly furthered his musical education in continental Europe.

== Personal life ==
In 1885, Machardy dedicated his Sonata Sancta Felice to Baroness Felice Wielobycki (Lady Henrietta Felicia Kierblewska Kennedy), the widow of controversial Polish Doctor and homeopath Dionysius Wielobycki whom he later married on 31 July 1886 in London. Following their marriage, the couple traveled extensively across Europe, focusing on musical studies and performances before returning to Scotland.

Machardy and the Baroness lived in Edinburgh during the early 1890s before relocating to Lesmahagow and eventually Whitehill, near Strathaven, around 1910. In Whitehill, they lived reclusively in a self-constructed wooden house, described by some as a "primitive hut," surrounded by barbed wire and guard dogs. They practiced self-sufficiency, growing vegetables, keeping livestock, and cultivating flowers.

Machardy died of heart failure on 8 July 1921 after a period of illness, aged 72, and was buried in Warriston Cemetery, Edinburgh. Following his death, Felice fell into financial and emotional despair. She was forcibly removed to Lanark District Asylum at Hartwood, where she died just two weeks later, aged 74, and was buried in a pauper's grave. Their story of a dramatic decline from prosperity to poverty attracted local media coverage.

== Career ==
Machardy's career spanned composition, performance, conducting, and teaching. He is believed to have composed over a hundred works, ranging from operas and cantatas to orchestral symphonies and sacred music. His two instructional books, Progressive Pianoforte Playing and Progressive Sight Singing, were well-received and ran to multiple editions. Despite this, much of his output remains unpublished or lost, with only a few manuscripts known to be archived in institutions like the British Library and the Boston Public Library.

=== Works ===
Machardy achieved his greatest success in the 1880s and 1890s. He was often his own librettist but also collaborated successfully with others, most notably the Wigtownshire poet Reverend David R Williamson whose poems Song of the Sea, Song of the Morning and A Reverie from the book Poems of Nature and Life he set to music for some of the best singers of the time. These included Therese Tietjens, Pauline Donalda, Adelina Patti and Marguerite Macintyre. It was reported in 1895 that he had been requested to compose an orchestral symphony for the Crystal Palace by August Manns, and that he had "elicited attention and high appreciation of Madame Christine Nilson, Madame Alwina Valleria, Madame Pappenheim, Madame Trebelli, and other musical personages of the highest rank".

Notable dedications include:

- 1892 - Princess Mary of Teck accepted The Unselfish Offering with words by Reverend George Matheson D.D, composed in memory of HRH the Duke of Clarence and Avondale
- 1893 - the Duke of York accepted the dedication of an orchestral symphony entitled The Royal Wedding Symphony
- 1883 - Princess Mary of Teck accepted the dedication of The Royal Bridal Overture(orchestral)
- 1901 - King Edward VII accepted a copy of Salvator Mundi(sacred opera libretto)
- 1904 - Pope Pius X also accepted a copy of Salvator Mundi and sent his apostolic blessing
- 1915 - Lord Stamfordham accepted a copy of Machardy's opera Shades of Burns on behalf of King George V
- 1916 - Shades of Burns was performed under the patronage of the Duke and Duchess of Hamilton and Lord Newlands
- 1918 - Lady Margaret Scott the daughter of the Duke of Buccleuch accepted the dedication of a Mazurka entitled Scots in Poland

It is thought Machardy also composed up to twenty operas and cantatas, among them are known to be:

- 1880 - Hymn of the Seasons Cantatina - Poetry by D. R. Williamson.
- 1882 - The Moorland Witch cantata - poetry by David Herbert M.A
- 1886 - The Woodland Witch cantata
- 1886 - Fairy Mother cantata
- 1897 - The Goblins - opera performed in Glasgow's St Andrews Halls,
- 1911 - The Laird of Heather Hall - opera featuring the bagpipes as an orchestral instrument
- 1912 - Royal Court Romance opera
- 1913 - The Jester opera
- 1914 - The Palace of Delight opera
- 1915 - Prince Charlie opera featuring the bagpipes as an orchestral instrument
- 1916 - The Shades of Burns opera

==== Verse ====
Machardy also wrote poetry, with several of his poems published in contemporary newspapers. Many of these works were dedicated to individuals he admired, including King George V and Queen Mary, Dame Nellie Melba, Pauline Donalda, and Sims Reeves. Machardy shared a strong association with Reeves, who referenced his work eighteen times in his 1888 autobiography. Some of Machardy's poems conveyed social messages, such as Intemperance (1895), which addressed the dangers of alcohol, and Beatitudes (1921).

Scottish Patriotism

Machardy's compositions often incorporated Scottish folklore, melodies and instruments, such as bagpipes. He was an outspoken advocate for the recognition and funding of native Scottish music and musicians over the more fashionable European influences of the time.

=== Rediscovery ===
Although largely forgotten after his death, interest in Machardy's work was revived in 2022 with the publication of Strathaven's Russian Princess by amateur historian Bob Currie. This coincided with efforts to restore Hartwood Hospital's paupers' cemetery, where Felice was buried. The couple's dramatic story has since been incorporated into a creative project entitled In the Hartwood, which began as part of the Scottish Storytelling Festival 2023.

In 2024, three of Machardy's compositions—Song of the Sea (1879), The Soldiers (1879), and What Is There In That Beaming Eye? (1876)—were rediscovered and performed for the first time in over a century by Scottish soprano Monica McGhee and pianist Geoffrey Tanti at the Henderson Theatre in Shotts.
