= Davie Whiteford =

Scottish footballer

Personal information
- Full name: David Whiteford
- Date of birth: 9 August 1944 (age 82)
- Place of birth: Shotts, Scotland
- Height: 5 ft 8 in (1.73 m)
- Position: Right back

Senior career*
Years	Team	Apps	(Gls)
1965–1973	Motherwell	197	(13)
1973–1976	Falkirk	63	(1)
1976–1979	East Stirlingshire	83	(1)
- Rutherglen Glencairn
Total		343	(15)

Managerial career
- 1985–1987: East Stirlingshire
- * Club domestic league appearances and goals

David Whiteford (born 9 August 1944) is a Scottish former footballer who played mainly as a right back. The greater part of his senior career (which did not begin until his early 20s once he had completed his education in order to become a schoolteacher) was spent with Motherwell where he played for eight years and made over 200 appearances, experiencing a relegation from the top division in 1967–68 followed by promotion as winners of Division Two the following season, as well as taking part in a Scottish League Cup semi-final later in 1969 and eliminating Tottenham Hotspur from the Texaco Cup in 1970.

He moved to Falkirk in 1973, spending three seasons with the Bairns, then a further three with local rivals East Stirlingshire. Now well into his 30s, he had a spell at junior level with Rutherglen Glencairn before retiring. In 1985 he returned to East Stirlingshire as manager, but the part-time club failed to improve on their status as one of the weaker teams in the bottom division and he was dismissed in 1987.

His father Jock, younger brother Jocky (a teammate at Falkirk and Glencairn, and coaching colleague at East Stirlingshire) and cousin Derek Whiteford were also footballers.

== Managerial statistics ==
Team	From	To	Record				
Team	From	To	G	W	D	L	Win %
East Stirlingshire	May 1985	February 1987	71	16	14	41	22.54

== Honours ==
Motherwell

- Scottish Football League Division Two: 1968–69

Falkirk Scottish Football League Division Two Champions 1974-75
