= Derby County F.C. league record by opponent =

Derby County Football Club is an English association football club based in Derby, which competes in the EFL Championship during the 2026–27 season. The club was founded in 1884, by William Morley, as an offshoot of Derbyshire County Cricket Club; it has spent all but six seasons in the top two divisions of the English football league. The club's competitive peak came in the 1970s when it had two spells as English League Champions and competed in major European competitions on four separate occasions, reaching the European Cup semi-finals, as well as winning several minor trophies. The club was also a strong force in the interwar years of the football league and also won the 1945–46 FA Cup.

Derby County are founder members of the Football League, which was created in 1888. Over the years Derby have played in the First Division, Second Division, Third Division, Third Division North, Premier League, the Championship and League One. Since 2024, Derby competes in the third tier of English football, Championship, after promotion from the League One.

Derby's first opponent was Bolton Wanderers on 8 September 1888 a game which Derby won 6–3. Their most regular opponents have been Middlesbrough having met Boro 146 times whilst Derby best record is against Bolton Wanderers, Derby beating the Trotters 66 times. The most league defeats inflicted upon Derby is against Liverpool who have triumphed over Derby 66 times while the most drawn matches have come against Stoke City with the two teams sharing the points on 40 occasions. Derby have played a total of 109 different league opponents.

== Key ==
- The records include the results of matches played in The Football League (from 1888 to 1996, 2002 to 2007, 2008 to present) and the Premier League (from 1996 to 2002, 2007 to 2008). Wartime matches are regarded as unofficial and are excluded, as are matches from the abandoned 1939–40 seasons. Football League play-offs, Test Matches and cup matches are not included.
- For the sake of simplicity, present-day names are used throughout: for example, results against Ardwick, Small Heath and Woolwich Arsenal are integrated into the records against Manchester City, Birmingham City and Arsenal, respectively.
- † Teams with this background and symbol in the "Club" column are current divisional rivals of Derby County.
- ‡ Clubs with this background and symbol in the "Club" column are defunct.
- P = matches played; W = matches won; D = matches drawn; L = matches lost; F = Goals scored; A = Goals conceded; Win% = percentage of total matches won

== All-time league record ==
Statistics correct as of matches played on 6 November 2026.

Derby County F.C. league record by opponent
Opponent	P	W	D	L	P	W	D	L	P	W	D	L	F	A	Win%	Ref(s)
Opponent	Home				Away				Total						Win%	Ref(s)
Accrington ‡	5	1	2	2	5	1	1	3	10	2	3	5	17	27	20%	
Accrington Stanley ‡	2	1	1	0	2	0	1	1	4	1	2	1	8	6	25%	
Accrington Stanley (Note: Club formed in 1968 after original club dissolved)	1	1	0	0	1	1	0	0	2	2	0	0	7	0	100%	
Arsenal	49	25	10	14	49	12	10	27	98	37	20	41	142	152	26%	
Aston Villa	62	29	12	21	62	9	11	42	124	38	23	63	162	238	31%	
Barnsley	37	23	8	6	37	11	9	17	74	34	17	23	108	86	46%	
Barrow	2	1	1	0	2	1	1	0	4	2	2	0	9	7	50%	
Birmingham City †	60	28	21	11	59	17	16	26	119	45	37	37	204	168	38%	
Blackburn Rovers †	63	26	21	16	63	13	12	38	126	39	33	54	219	213	31%	
Blackpool	35	23	8	4	35	10	8	17	70	33	16	21	121	89	47%	
Bolton Wanderers †	66	44	14	8	65	22	9	34	131	66	23	42	237	190	50%	
Bournemouth	6	5	0	1	6	1	3	2	12	6	3	3	16	12	50%	
Bradford City	17	8	4	5	17	6	6	5	34	14	10	10	49	38	41%	
Bradford (Park Avenue)	9	6	1	2	9	3	1	5	18	9	2	7	34	27	50%	
Brentford	16	8	4	4	16	4	6	6	32	12	10	10	54	57	38%	
Brighton & Hove Albion	17	9	4	4	17	5	2	10	34	14	6	14	40	39	41%	
Bristol City †	37	25	5	7	37	12	11	14	74	37	16	21	129	84	50%	
Bristol Rovers	14	9	3	2	14	4	4	6	28	13	7	8	45	39	46%	
Burnley †	49	26	11	12	50	13	12	25	99	39	23	37	148	141	39%	
Burton Albion	4	3	1	0	4	1	1	2	8	4	2	2	10	7	50%	
Bury	29	22	4	3	29	5	9	15	58	27	13	18	99	84	47%	
Cambridge United	9	4	4	1	9	6	2	1	18	10	6	2	17	10	56%	
Cardiff City †	36	13	11	12	35	5	9	21	71	18	20	33	97	118	25%	
Carlisle United	10	4	2	4	10	3	3	4	20	7	5	8	27	26	35%	
Charlton Athletic †	45	20	12	13	46	18	9	19	91	38	21	32	146	142	42%	
Chelsea	47	24	10	13	47	11	15	21	94	35	25	34	138	136	37%	
Cheltenham Town	2	2	0	0	2	1	1	0	4	3	1	0	8	4	75%	
Chester City ‡	2	2	0	0	2	1	1	0	4	3	1	0	13	5	75%	
Chesterfield	5	2	3	0	5	2	1	2	10	4	4	2	19	9	40%	
Colchester United	1	1	0	0	1	0	0	1	2	1	0	1	8	5	50%	
Coventry City	40	22	11	7	40	10	10	20	80	32	21	27	107	105	40%	
Crewe Alexandra	5	2	2	1	5	2	1	2	10	4	3	3	23	17	40%	
Crystal Palace	32	20	6	6	32	8	10	14	64	28	16	20	91	69	44%	
Darlington	4	1	2	1	4	0	1	3	8	1	3	4	10	13	13%	
Darwen ‡	2	2	0	0	2	1	0	1	4	3	0	1	12	5	75%	
Doncaster Rovers	10	6	1	3	10	6	0	4	20	12	1	7	36	22	60%	
Everton	63	30	9	24	63	12	12	39	126	42	21	63	173	240	33%	
Exeter City	2	1	1	0	2	2	0	0	4	3	1	0	7	1	75%	
Fleetwood Town	2	1	0	1	2	1	1	0	4	2	1	1	4	3	50%	
Forest Green Rovers	1	1	0	0	1	1	0	0	2	2	0	0	6	0	100%	
Fulham	29	17	8	4	29	4	13	12	58	21	21	16	97	83	36%	
Gainsborough Trinity	5	4	1	0	5	2	3	0	10	6	4	0	29	8	60%	
Gillingham	5	4	1	0	5	2	1	2	10	6	2	2	14	7	60%	
Glossop North End	7	6	1	0	7	2	3	2	14	8	4	2	32	17	57%	
Grimsby Town	33	20	7	6	33	12	8	13	66	32	15	19	115	88	48%	
Halifax Town ‡	2	2	0	0	2	0	1	1	4	2	1	1	12	4	50%	
Hartlepool United	2	2	0	0	2	0	0	2	4	2	0	2	6	6	50%	
Huddersfield Town	48	32	12	4	48	7	15	26	96	39	27	30	142	136	41%	
Hull City	32	16	7	9	32	8	10	14	64	24	17	23	93	83	38%	
Ipswich Town	43	15	12	16	43	13	9	21	86	28	21	37	110	123	33%	
Leeds City ‡	6	4	1	1	6	3	0	3	12	7	1	4	35	23	58%	
Leeds United	56	24	14	18	56	11	13	32	112	35	27	50	139	167	31%	
Leicester City	50	28	7	15	50	14	18	18	100	42	25	33	139	130	42%	
Leyton Orient	23	15	3	5	23	7	4	12	46	22	7	17	64	49	50%	
Lincoln City †	14	13	1	0	14	5	5	4	28	18	6	4	61	32	64%	
Liverpool	63	26	23	24	63	6	15	42	126	32	28	66	156	248	25%	
Luton Town	22	10	8	4	22	5	2	15	44	15	10	19	54	52	34%	
Manchester City	46	24	11	11	46	8	9	29	92	32	20	40	132	143	35%	
Manchester United	45	16	17	12	45	11	10	24	90	27	27	36	132	157	30%	
Mansfield Town	2	2	0	0	2	1	1	0	4	3	1	0	11	2	75%	
Middlesbrough †	73	36	17	20	73	15	16	42	146	51	33	62	207	241	35%	
Millwall †	28	9	7	12	29	7	9	13	57	16	16	25	62	68	28%	
Milton Keynes Dons	2	0	1	1	2	2	0	0	4	2	1	1	7	4	50%	
Morecambe	1	1	0	0	1	0	1	0	2	1	1	0	6	1	50%	
Nelson	1	1	0	0	1	0	0	1	2	1	0	1	7	2	50%	
Newcastle United	56	23	14	19	56	13	15	28	112	36	29	46	138	164	32%	
Newport County	2	0	2	0	2	1	1	0	4	1	3	0	8	6	25%	
Northampton Town	4	2	2	0	4	2	1	1	8	4	3	1	15	8	50%	
Norwich City †	35	11	15	9	36	10	5	21	71	21	20	29	83	104	30%	
Nottingham Forest	50	20	14	16	50	13	14	23	100	33	28	39	147	144	33%	
Notts County	27	14	9	4	27	8	9	10	54	22	18	14	83	64	41%	
Oldham Athletic	20	12	5	3	20	6	7	8	40	17	12	11	53	50	43%	
Oxford United	9	4	2	3	9	4	2	3	18	8	4	6	19	17	44%	
Peterborough United	8	5	1	2	8	2	1	5	16	7	2	7	27	25	44%	
Plymouth Argyle	22	14	4	4	22	9	5	8	44	23	9	12	78	59	52%	
Port Vale	11	8	1	2	11	4	2	5	22	12	3	7	37	23	55%	
Portsmouth †	46	28	9	9	47	12	13	22	93	40	22	34	148	128	43%	
Preston North End †	58	34	10	14	58	14	12	32	116	48	22	46	147	160	41%	
Queens Park Rangers †	30	15	6	9	31	9	12	10	61	24	18	19	76	74	39%	
Reading	24	11	3	10	24	4	6	14	48	15	9	24	64	80	31%	
Rochdale	2	2	0	0	2	2	0	1	4	3	0	1	11	3	75%	
Rotherham United	27	16	6	5	27	4	11	12	54	20	17	17	89	78	37%	
Scunthorpe United	10	5	3	2	10	3	2	5	20	8	5	7	45	38	40%	
Sheffield United †	55	33	7	15	56	13	10	33	111	46	17	48	172	161	41%	
Sheffield Wednesday	65	35	19	11	65	16	19	30	130	51	38	41	214	176	39%	
Shrewsbury Town	7	2	4	1	7	1	2	4	14	3	6	5	14	19	21%	
South Shields ‡	7	5	1	1	7	1	2	4	14	6	5	3	27	20	43%	
Southampton †	32	15	13	4	32	8	9	15	64	23	22	19	99	95	36%	
Southend United	6	3	0	3	6	2	1	3	12	5	1	6	15	14	42%	
Southport	2	2	0	0	2	1	0	1	4	3	0	1	11	5	75%	
Stevenage	1	1	0	0	1	0	0	1	2	1	0	1	2	3	50%	
Stockport County	12	11	0	1	12	0	3	9	24	11	3	10	41	28	46%	
Stoke City †	69	39	19	11	68	13	22	33	137	52	41	44	223	176	38%	
Sunderland	66	34	15	17	66	12	12	42	132	46	27	59	183	209	35%	
Swansea City †	25	12	4	9	24	5	4	15	49	17	8	24	78	82	35%	
Swindon Town	5	5	0	0	5	2	2	1	10	7	2	1	23	12	70%	
Tottenham Hotspur	32	17	9	6	32	7	8	17	64	24	17	23	100	94	38%	
Tranmere Rovers	7	4	1	2	7	2	0	5	16	6	1	7	28	23	43%	
Walsall	6	3	1	3	6	2	2	2	14	5	3	4	17	14	42%	
Watford †	23	10	6	7	23	6	7	10	46	16	13	17	67	67	35%	
West Bromwich Albion †	56	32	16	8	55	12	15	28	110	44	31	36	180	158	40%	
West Ham United †	34	17	8	9	35	6	15	14	69	23	23	22	93	102	33%	
Wigan Athletic	11	3	4	4	11	6	1	4	22	9	5	8	23	23	41%	
Wimbledon ‡	10	4	4	2	10	1	4	5	20	5	8	7	26	26	25%	
Wolverhampton Wanderers †	71	38	12	21	71	21	18	32	142	59	30	53	249	245	42%	
Workington	2	0	1	1	2	1	0	1	4	1	1	2	8	7	25%	
Wrexham †	6	3	1	2	5	1	3	1	11	4	4	3	14	12	36%	
Wycombe Wanderers	3	1	2	0	3	1	1	1	6	2	3	1	8	7	33%	
Yeovil Town	1	1	0	0	1	1	0	0	2	2	0	0	6	2	100%	
York City	4	4	0	0	4	1	2	1	8	5	2	1	12	7	63%	
