= John Mulhall =

John Mulhall may refer to:

- John Mulhall (hurler)
- John Mulhall (footballer)
- John Mulhall (gymnast)
