= Thomas Duncan =

Thomas or Tom Duncan may refer to:

- Thomas Duncan (general) (1819–1887), United States Army general during the Civil War
- Thomas Duncan (Canadian politician) (died 1910), politician in Manitoba, Canada
- Thomas Duncan (painter) (1807–1845), Scottish portraitist and historical painter
- Thomas Duncan (American politician) (1893–1959), Milwaukee socialist senator and representative
- Thomas William Duncan (1905–1987), American writer
- Thomas Eric Duncan (1972–2014), first person to die of Ebola in the United States
- Tom Duncan (politician) (1836–1914), New Zealand Liberal Party politician
- Tom Duncan (businessman), American entrepreneur and business executive
- Tom Duncan (artist), Scottish-born mixed-media artist and sculptor
- Tommy Duncan (1911–1967), American musician
- Tommy Duncan (footballer) (born 1936), Scottish footballer and manager
