= Samuel Booth =

Samuel Booth may refer to:

- Samuel B. Booth (1883–1935), bishop of the Episcopal Diocese of Vermont
- Samuel Booth (politician) (1818–1894), mayor of Brooklyn
- Sam Booth (1926–1968), Scottish footballer
- Samuel Booth, father of William Booth, founder of the Salvation Army
