= Salsburgh =

Coordinates: 55.84136°N 3.87795°W

- Location within North Lanarkshire
- Population: 1,330 (2020)
- OS grid reference: NS825625
- Council area: North Lanarkshire
- Lieutenancy area: Lanarkshire
- Country: Scotland
- Sovereign state: United Kingdom
- Post town: SHOTTS
- Postcode district: ML7
- Dialling code: 01698 870/1
- Police: Scotland
- Fire: Scottish
- Ambulance: Scottish
- UK Parliament: Airdrie and Shotts
- Scottish Parliament: Airdrie and Shotts

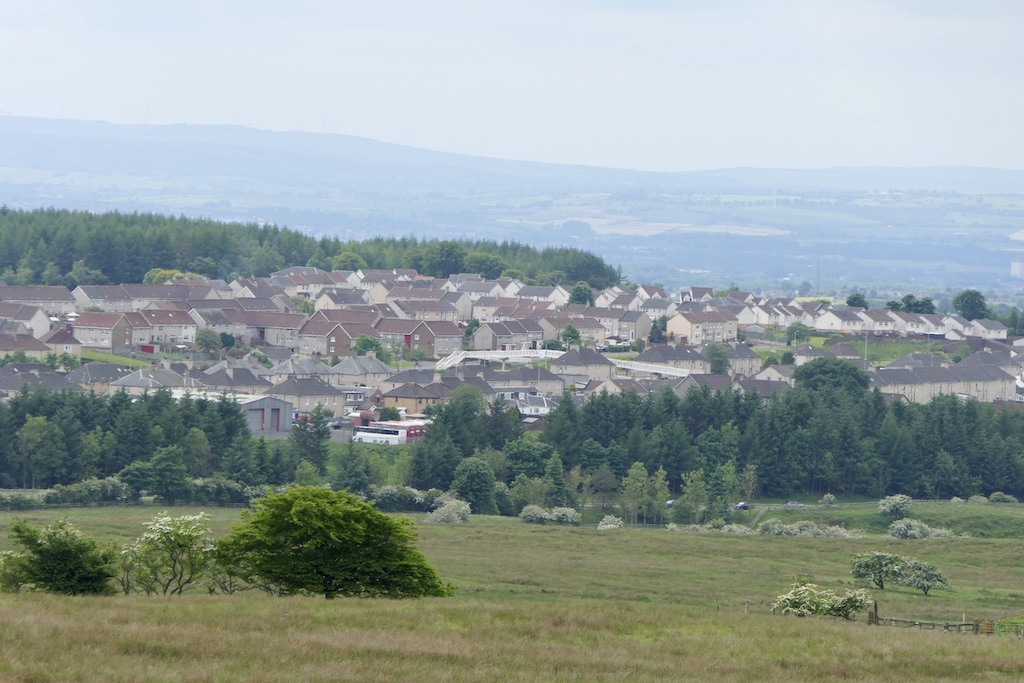
Salsburgh

Salsburgh is a semi-rural former coal mining village in greenbelt farmland within the district of North Lanarkshire, Scotland. The closest major towns to the village are Shotts, three miles (five kilometres) southeast, and Airdrie three miles (five kilometres) northwest.

Salsburgh is perhaps best known for the floodlit Kirk O' Shotts Church, which sits on a hillock and is fairly visible as visitors enter the village from the east on the B7066 Whitburn to Newhouse road. The busy M8 Motorway runs adjacent to the B7066 and gives the Church the affectionate title 'The M8 Church'.

== Founding ==
There has been a community in the area for over 600 years, although the present village dates back to 1729. At that time only a row of four houses existed, named "Muirhall, Girdhimstrait, Merchanthall and Craighead". Craighead was home to a Mr. Young and his wife Sally, and when Young sold some of his land to construct more houses it was decided that it would be named "Sallysburgh". Through time the name was shortened to Salsburgh.

Streets around the village are named after significant natives from its past relating to industry, mining, farming and agriculture.

== Coal mining ==
=== Duntilland ===
Duntilland Colliery began production in 1896 with a workforce of just under 200. Their main production was specializing in coal types of/in manufacturing, anthracite and steam. It closed in 1951 and was owned and operated by Coltness Iron Co. Ltd.

=== Fortissat ===
Fortissat Colliery began production in 1870 with a workforce of just under 300. Their main production was specializing in coal types of/in-house and steam. It closed in 1949 and was owned and operated by Shotts Iron Co. Ltd.

=== Ardenrigg ===
Ardenrigg Colliery began production in 1926 with a workforce of just under 300. Their main production was specializing in coal types of/in anthracite. It closed in 1963 and was owned and operated by Ardenrigg Coal Co. Ltd.

=== Dewshill ===
Dewshill Collierie began production in 1896. The population of their workforce is not known. Their main production was specializing in coal types of/in anthracite. It closed in 1943 after being redeveloped in 1923 and was owned and operated by Coltness Iron Co. Ltd. The pumping shaft eventually sunk in 1957.

=== Hirstrigg ===
Hirstrigg Collierie began production sometime around after 1880 with a work force of between 200 and 300. It is not known what coal type they specialized in. It was originally owned and operated by Hirst Coal Co. Ltd (Glasgow) then latterly became under the ownership of Garscube Coal Co. Ltd (Edinburgh). It closed sometime around the 1940s.

== Facilities ==
=== Kirk O' Shotts (Shottskirk) Public/Primary School ===
Kirk O' Shotts is the name of the local school which opened initially in 1700 in a rented building in the southern edge of the old Shottskirk churchyard; however, it was decided that a new school would be built opposite the church on what is now Newmill Canthill Road. It officially opened in 1799.

Due to an increase in school roll the original school was deemed no longer viable. A new school was built to the east end of the village and was opened in August 1912 as Shottskirk Public School, which later reverted to its original roots as Kirk O' Shotts in 1958 as a junior / secondary school.

The school celebrated its centenary on 12 August 2012. Kirk O' Shotts remains a public school open to all denominations.

=== Kirk O' Shotts (Shottskirk) Parish Church ===
Kirk O' Shotts Parish Church is the name of the local church which serves the parish of Salsburgh, Shotts and surrounding area. The church was formerly a Catholic place of worship under the name St. Catherine's, taken from Catherine of Siena. About 550 years ago Bothwell and Shotts formed one parish which stretched from the Clyde to Linlithgowshire, and from the North to the South Calder. In this large area there were four places of worship, one of which was situated in the middle Bothwellmuir.

St. Catherine's Chapel was built in 1450. It was dedicated to "the blessed Virgin and Catherine of Siena".

After the Reformation of 1560, Kirk O' Shotts, otherwise known as Shottskirk or the affectionately titled "M8 Church", became a Protestant place of worship. The old church of St Catherine's must have suffered many changes and required frequent changes since its foundation, but of these there is no account before 1640. In that year the Presbytery met at Shotts and ordered that the church be repaired and partly rebuilt, but it was more than eight years before the work was completed. The site of the old church is marked by the headstone erected to Samuel Meuros, who was session clerk and school master from 1794 to 1837. He was also Precentor, and it was his wish to be buried where his old desk had stood; thus he lies still at his post. On the back of the stone is the following inscription:

"Here stood the Precentor's desk in the Kirk of Bertram Shotts which was rebuilt and extended in 1642".

This stone and the burial ground of the Inglises of Murdoston, which was inside the old church, give a clear idea of the site.

=== St. Catherine's Well / "Kate's Well" ===
St. Catherine's Well or "Kate's Well" is a natural holy spring well on holy ground at the foot of Kirk O'Shott's Parish Church, otherwise known as Shottskirk, in the village of Salsburgh, North Lanarkshire. The well dates back to the 14th century and derives from the church's former past when it was a Catholic place of worship as St. Catherines Chapel which has origins from Catherine of Siena.

Kate's Well was also the scene of the local legendary giant Bertram de Shotts' demise where his head was decapitated as he drank from the well.

=== Skate park ===
In November 2019 it was announced that funding would be released for a new skate park, to be located top end of the King George Fifth park off Bogfoot Road and Reid Street. Work commenced on the skate park in October 2021 and completed in early 2022.

=== Miner statue ===
In November 2019 it was also announced along with the new skate park, would be a new miner statue to commemorate the villages rich mining history. This has since been abandoned.

=== The Transmitters ===
Salsburgh is the locale of the twin BlackHill Transmitters due to its high position towering above the M8 motorway opposite the church. They can be seen as far as Bathgate, West Lothian to the east and Glasgow to the west. The transmitters are quite a prominent feature after dark for miles around, due to the coloured red lights which prevent aircraft from striking the towers.

The Kirk o'Shotts transmitting station is also nearby, which formerly carried a TV service and today carries DAB radio.

=== Pre-fabricated buildings ===
Salsburgh was one of the first places in Scotland to have a "pre-fab", a prefabricated home with corrugated steel walls built. The first pre-fab in the UK was built in the village in 1945.

=== Schools and nurseries ===
- Kirk O' Shotts Primary School (public, non-denominational)
- Rowantree Nursery / Kirk O' Shotts Nursery

=== Places of worship ===
- Kirk O' Shotts Parish Church (Protestant)
- Sacred Heart R.C Chapel (Catholic)
- Salsburgh Gospel Hall (Christian)

== Geography ==
=== Climate ===
Salsburgh has an oceanic climate (Köppen: Cfb).

Climate data for Salsburgh (277 m or 909 ft asl, averages 1991–2020)
Month	Jan	Feb	Mar	Apr	May	Jun	Jul	Aug	Sep	Oct	Nov	Dec	Year
Mean daily maximum °C (°F)	5.1 (41.2)	5.7 (42.3)	7.5 (45.5)	10.4 (50.7)	13.5 (56.3)	16.0 (60.8)	17.6 (63.7)	17.2 (63.0)	14.8 (58.6)	11.2 (52.2)	7.7 (45.9)	5.4 (41.7)	11.0 (51.8)
Daily mean °C (°F)	2.8 (37.0)	3.1 (37.6)	4.5 (40.1)	6.8 (44.2)	9.5 (49.1)	12.1 (53.8)	13.8 (56.8)	13.6 (56.5)	11.6 (52.9)	8.4 (47.1)	5.2 (41.4)	3.1 (37.6)	7.9 (46.2)
Mean daily minimum °C (°F)	0.5 (32.9)	0.5 (32.9)	1.4 (34.5)	3.2 (37.8)	5.6 (42.1)	8.3 (46.9)	10.1 (50.2)	10.0 (50.0)	8.3 (46.9)	5.5 (41.9)	2.7 (36.9)	0.8 (33.4)	4.8 (40.6)
Average rainfall mm (inches)	103.0 (4.06)	85.6 (3.37)	84.2 (3.31)	62.1 (2.44)	70.2 (2.76)	84.1 (3.31)	98.5 (3.88)	105.5 (4.15)	88.3 (3.48)	115.1 (4.53)	101.1 (3.98)	107.1 (4.22)	1,104.7 (43.49)
Average rainy days (≥ 1 mm)	16.9	14.4	14.5	12.7	13.0	13.4	15.1	15.1	13.8	16.4	16.9	16.1	178.3
Source: Met Office

STV have reported several times from the village, most notably in relation to extreme weather conditions such as snow. Salsburgh also has a Met Office weather Observation Station: (Lat: 55.8667 | Long: -3.8667).

== Homes ==
Throughout the years there have been a variety of mixed styles of properties in the village, beginning with prefabs (prefabricated structures with tin roofs) which were then replaced with more substantial council authority brick-built homes.

The village today consists of detached, semi-detached, terraced, bungalows, cottages, miners' row cottages (most of which are council authority and/or privately owned former local authority properties) and also fully renovated former derelict properties and new builds such as Salsburgh Meadows and the new builds situated in sections of Main Street.

The village has a mix of old (miners' rows) and new (Salsburgh Meadows), and is given a certain charm by retaining the old buildings from years gone by.

Salsburgh is one of the few places in North Lanarkshire that does not have a gas main, as it was not cost effective when the pipes were being laid. Services are provided independently by oil/LPG and coal suppliers.

Most street names within the village have some significance to the village's history and/or former residents.

== Landmarks ==
- Kirk O' Shotts Parish Church: 'The M8 Church'
- Blackhill Transmitters
- Mozart's birthplace

Other landmarks include the footbridge which crosses the B7066 main road, which was struck by a careless crane driver in 2009. It was rebuilt and reopened in 2014.

== Population ==
The 2001 United Kingdom census recorded a population of 1310. It was estimated as of 2018 that the village currently is populated by 1370 residents.

== Nearby towns and villages ==
- Airdrie
- Allanton
- Bellshill
- Dewshill
- Forrestfield
- Harthill
- Hartwood
- Holytown
- Mossend
- Motherwell
- Newhouse
- Newmains
- Shotts
- Shottsburn
- Wishaw

== Government and local groups ==
As of May 2022, the candidates elected to serve in Ward 13 Fortissat are:

- Margaret Hughes, Scottish National Party (SNP)
- John Jo Leckie, British Unionist Party
- Martin McCulloch, Scottish Labour Party
- Kenneth Stevenson, Scottish Labour Party

Local provost:

- Jean Jones

Deputy Provost:

- Tom Castles

The local MP is Anum Qaisar-Javed (SNP).

The local Constituency MSP is Neil Gray (SNP).

The Central Scotland regional MSPs for North Lanarkshire are:

- Meghan Gallacher
- Mark Griffin
- Stephen Kerr
- Monica Lennon
- Richard Leonard
- Gillian Mackay
- Graham Simpson

=== Local groups ===
There are several local groups in the village which have been set up to provide a service to the community.

Community Council provide information pertaining to planning, local interest surrounding the village and further awareness of events in the village.

== Notable natives ==
- Bertram de Shotts was a legendary giant who was said to roam the village of Shotts, and outlying village of Salsburgh
- Jamie Dolan (born 22 February 1969 in Salsburgh – 31 August 2008) was a Scottish professional footballer who played for Motherwell, Dundee United, Dunfermline Athletic, Livingston, Forfar Athletic and Partick Thistle
- Nat Muir (born 12 March 1958) is a Scottish retired long-distance runner. He competed at the IAAF World Cross Country Championships on ten occasions in the 1970s and 80s.
- Derek Whiteford (born 13 May 1947 in Salsburgh) was a Scottish football player and manager.
- Michelle Nangle, known professionally as Shelly Mack, is a children's book author.
- Paul Michael Clark (born 3rd of April 1999 in Salsburgh) Known professionally as Paul Michael/PMAC hand picked by Shania Twain to perform as a backing vocalist/dancer on her Queen of me tour (2023) and Come on over Las Vegas residency.
