= John May (footballer, born 1878) =

Scottish footballer (1878–1933)

Personal information
- Date of birth: 15 April 1878
- Place of birth: Dykehead, Scotland
- Date of death: 25 July 1933 (aged 55)
- Place of death: Glasgow, Scotland
- Position: Wing half

Youth career
- Rising Blues

Senior career*
| Years | Team | Apps | (Gls) |
| 1895–1896 | Bo'ness | | |
| 1896–1897 | Wishaw Thistle | 179 | (17) |
| 1897–1898 | Abercorn | 18 | (2) |
| 1898–1904 | Derby County | 179 | (17) |
| 1904–1910 | Rangers | 129 | (13) |
| 1910–1915 | Morton | 118 | (5) |
| Total | | 444 | (37) |

International career
| 1906–1909 | Scotland | 5 | (0) |
| 1906–1908 | Scottish League XI | 3 | (0) |
- * Club domestic league appearances and goals

John May (15 April 1878 – 25 July 1933) was a Scottish footballer who played for Abercorn, Derby County, Rangers, Morton and Scotland.

== Football career ==
=== Club ===
May played as a left half-back (comparable to a modern midfielder) and started his career at Bo'ness followed by Wishaw Thistle and Paisley club Abercorn, before signing for Derby County. Whilst there he played in two losing FA Cup finals (1899 and 1903). May made 179 league appearances for Derby, scoring 17 goals.

He joined Rangers in May 1904 and went on to play 148 times in the Scottish Football League and Scottish Cup, however, his spell at the club coincided almost exactly with a period when rivals Celtic were dominant, and May did not claim a winner's medal in either of the major competitions before he moved on to Morton in 1910.

=== International ===
May won five international caps for Scotland between 1906 and 1909, once as captain.

== Personal life ==
His younger brother Hugh was also a footballer who made a small number of appearances for both Rangers and Derby.

== See also ==
- List of Scottish football families
