= Derby County F.C. in European football =

English club in European football

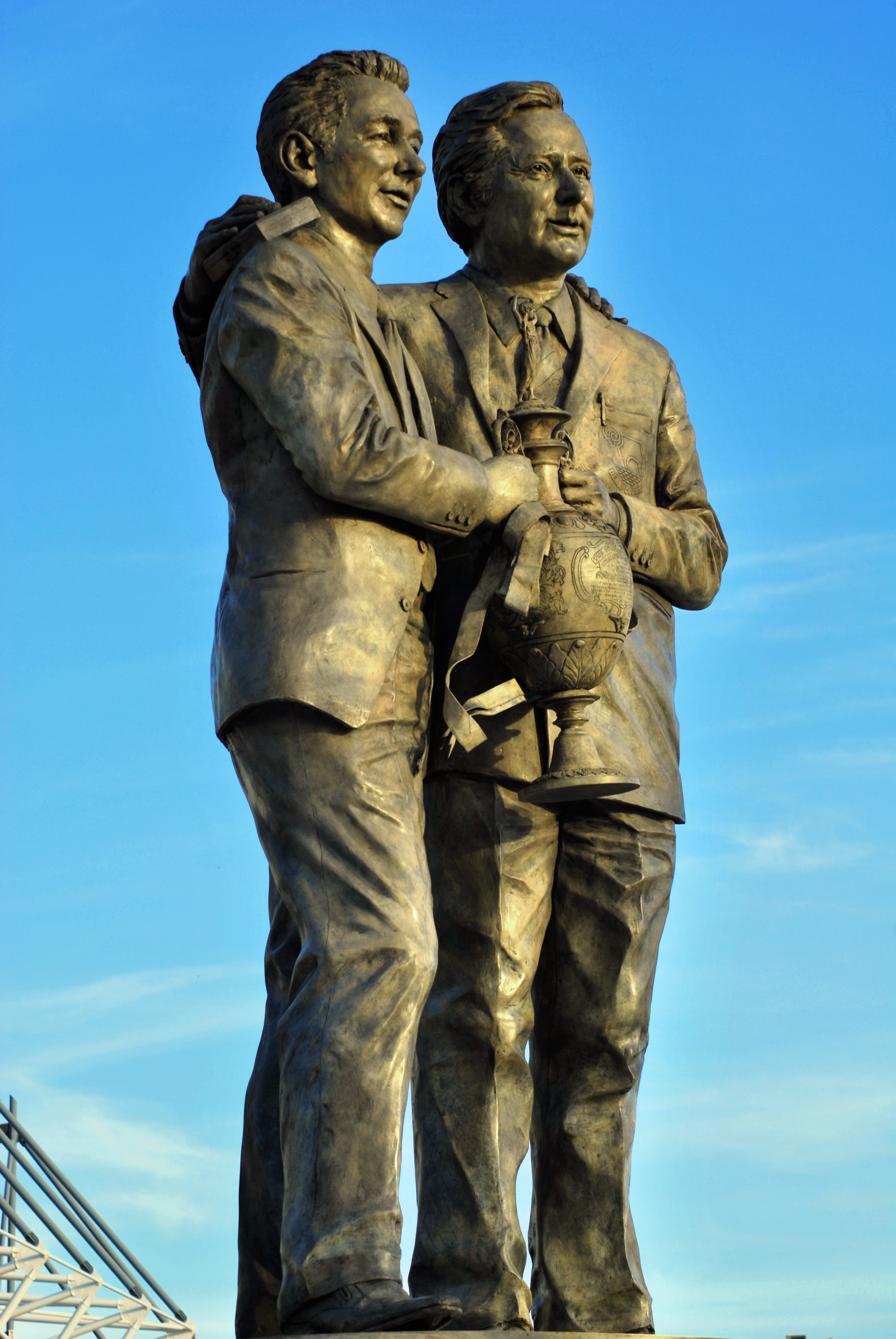
- Statue of Brian Clough and Peter Taylor, the management team during Derby's first European Cup campaign
- Club: Derby County
- Seasons played: 4
- First entry: 1972–73 European Cup
- Latest entry: 1976–77 UEFA Cup

Derby County Football Club is an English football club based in Derby. The club was founded in 1884 competed in the English football league system from its conception in 1888. Their first season in Europe came when they entered the 1972–73 European Cup after winning the 1971–72 First Division Title, reaching the semi-final stages, where they lost 3–1 on aggregate to Juventus in controversial circumstances. They had qualified for the 1970–71 Fairs Cup after finishing the 1969–70 First Division in 4th, but were banned from entering the competition due to financial irregularities. The 1970s saw Derby County's peak in English football and they qualified for Europe in three of the next four seasons, competing in the UEFA Cup or the European Cup in each of the three seasons between 1974–75 and 1976–77.

The club then declined rapidly and has not appeared in the top European competitions since.

Outside of major competition, the club won the Texaco Cup in 1971–72, and also competed in the Anglo-Italian Cup between 1992–93 and 1994–95, reaching the final in 1993, losing 3–1 to Cremonese at Wembley.

== History ==
=== 1971–72 Texaco Cup ===
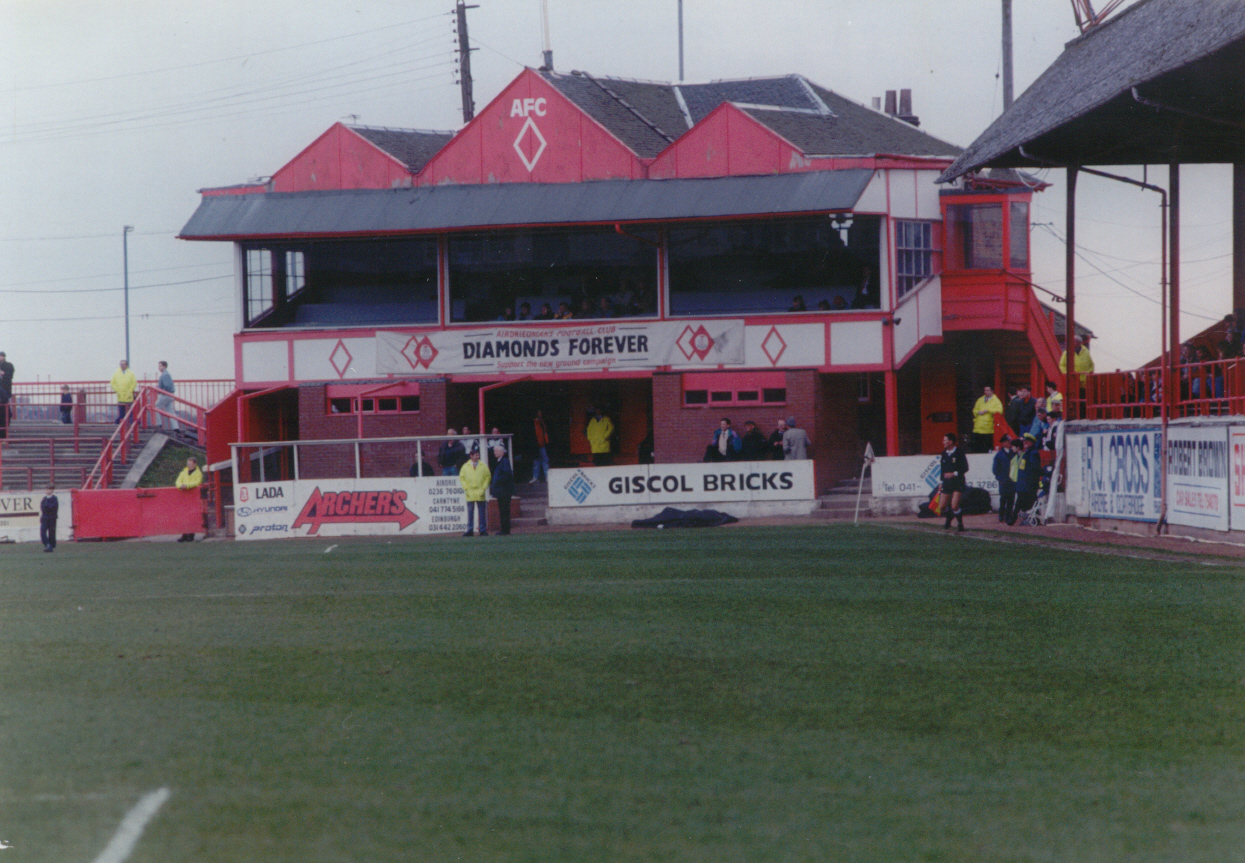
Broomfield Park, then home to Airdrieonians and venue of the away Texaco Cup final leg.

Derby entered the Texaco Cup for one season only: the 1971–72 season. The Rams' first opposition were Dundee United. Derby kicked off by winning 6–2, with goals from Alan Durban, Kevin Hector, Alan Hinton, John O'Hare, John Robson and Jim Walker. United won the away leg 3–2 however Derby progressed, winning 8–5 on aggregate. Victories against Stoke City and Newcastle United followed as Derby reached the final.

Their final opposition were Airdrieonians, who reached the final by beating English clubs Huddersfield Town and Manchester City then Ballymena United of Northern Ireland. The final was a two-legged tie. A Derby defence praised as "efficient" was left unbeaten in the leg at Broomfield Park as it finished goalless. The East Midlands leg, rearranged after the original game was postponed, was won 2–1 by the home team, with Derby's goals from Roger Davies and a hotly disputed penalty kick scored by Hinton; Derek Whiteford was the Airdrie goalscorer.

Season	Competition	Round	Opposition	Score
1971–72	Texaco Cup	First Round	(Scotland) Dundee United	6–2 (H), 3–2 (A)
1971–72	Texaco Cup	Second Round	(England) Stoke City	3–2 (H), 1–1 (A)
1971–72	Texaco Cup	Semifinals	(England) Newcastle United	1–0 (H), 2–3 (A) (Note: After extra time)
1971–72	Texaco Cup	Final	(Scotland) Airdrieonians	0–0 (A), 2–1 (H)

=== 1972–73 European Cup ===
After claiming the club's first ever League title the previous year, Brian Clough led Derby into their first major European campaign, four years after taking over the club then in the Second Division of English football. Clough led Derby to the semi-finals at the first attempt, recording a famous 3–0 aggregate victory over Eusébio's S.L. Benfica, the leading light of European football in the 1960s, and becoming only the second club in European football history (after Ajax) to keep a clean sheet against the club over two legs. Derby eventually lost out 3–1 to Juventus, although it was in controversial circumstances, with claims from Clough against the Italian people.

Season	Competition	Round	Opposition	Score
1972–73	European Cup	First Round	(Socialist Federal Republic of Yugoslavia) Željezničar	2–0 (H), 2–1 (A)
1972–73	European Cup	Second Round	(Portugal) Benfica	3–0 (H), 0–0 (A)
1972–73	European Cup	Quarter-final	(Czechoslovakia) Spartak Trnava	0–1 (A), 2–0 (H)
1972–73	European Cup	Semi-final	(Italy) Juventus	1–3 (A), 0–0 (H)

=== 1974–75 UEFA Cup ===
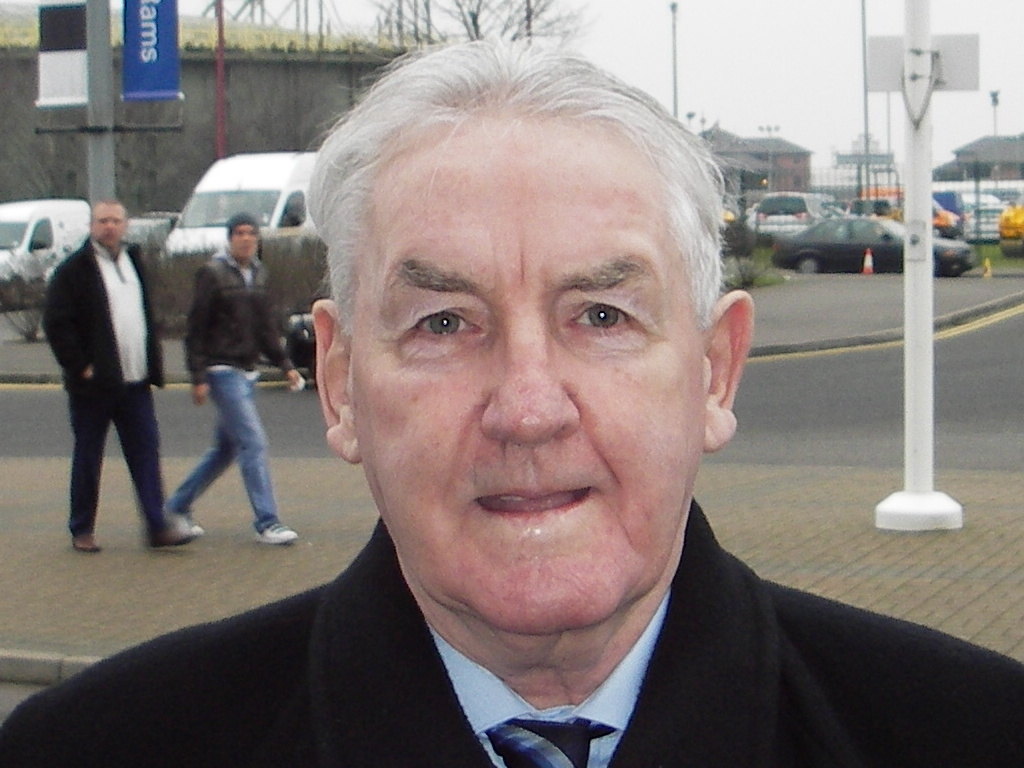
Dave Mackay (2006 image), manager during Derby's début UEFA Cup season.

Dave Mackay first led Derby into Europe when he took the club to a third-place finish in the 1973–74 after taking over from Brian Clough in October 1973. This was Derby's first entry into the UEFA Cup and the second round draw against Atlético Madrid marked Derby's first ever involvement in a penalty shootout; Derby won the shoot-out 7–6. That success put them into the third round, in which County drew Velež. After a 3–1 first leg victory at the Baseball Ground, Derby were beaten 4–1 away and eliminated as a result.

Season	Competition	Round	Opposition	Score
1974–75	UEFA Cup	First Round	(Switzerland) Servette	4–1 (H), 2–1 (A)
1974–75	UEFA Cup	Second Round	(Spain) Atlético Madrid	2–2 (H), 2–2 (A) (Note: Won 7–6 on penalties)
1974–75	UEFA Cup	Third Round	(Socialist Federal Republic of Yugoslavia) Velež	3–1 (H), 1–4 (A)

=== 1975–76 European Cup ===
Derby's second foray into the European Cup came in the 1975–76 competition under the management of Dave Mackay. Though the run contained arguably the greatest night in the club's history, a 4–1 home victory in the first leg of the second round over Real Madrid, in which Charlie George grabbed a hat-trick. However, a 5–1 defeat in the return leg at the Bernabéu saw Derby exit the competition. The gate of 120,000 is the largest to ever watch a Derby County match.

Season	Competition	Round	Opposition	Score
1975–76	European Cup	First Round	(Czechoslovakia) ŠK Slovan Bratislava	0–1 (A), 3–0 (H)
1975–76	European Cup	Second Round	(Spain) Real Madrid C.F.	4–1 (H), 1–5 (A)

=== 1976–77 UEFA Cup ===
Dave Mackay's third foray into Europe as Derby manager proved to be the club's last in major competition. The 12–0 first round victory over Finn Harps stands as the club's record victory in all competitions, whilst the second round defeat at home to AEK Athens was the club's first ever European home defeat. It was also one of MacKay's last games in charge of the club as he was sacked later that month, less than 18 months after winning the title.

Season	Competition	Round	Opposition	Score
1976–77	UEFA Cup	First Round	(Republic of Ireland) Finn Harps	12–0 (H), 4–1 (A)
1976–77	UEFA Cup	Second Round	(Greece) AEK Athens	0–2 (A), 2–3 (H)

=== 1992–93 Anglo-Italian Cup ===
The revival of the Anglo-Italian Cup for the 1992–93 campaign saw Derby, under the management of Arthur Cox, return to European Competition for the first time since 1976 and, thanks to reaching the final, return to Wembley for the first time since the 1975 Charity Shield. It also contributed to Derby's busiest ever season – the 9 matches leading up to the final were alongside a 46 match league campaign and reaching the FA Cup 6th Round (5 matches) and League Cup 3rd Round (4 matches), which resulted in a total of 64 matches, beating the previous club record of 60 from the 1985–86 season. The competition itself was largely unpopular though, with most home matches attracting gates of less than 8,000.

Season	Competition	Round	Opposition	Score
1992–93	Anglo-Italian Cup	Preliminary Round	(England) Notts County	4–2 (H)
1992–93	Anglo-Italian Cup	Preliminary Round	(England) Barnsley	2–1(A)
1992–93	Anglo-Italian Cup	Group B	(Italy) Pisa Calcio	3–0 (H)
1992–93	Anglo-Italian Cup	Group B	(Italy) Cosenza Calcio 1914	3–0 (A)
1992–93	Anglo-Italian Cup	Group B	(Italy) U.S. Cremonese	1–3 (H)
1992–93	Anglo-Italian Cup	Group B	(Italy) Reggina Calcio	3–0 (A)
1992–93	Anglo-Italian Cup	Semi-final	(England) Brentford	4–3 (A), 1–2 (H)
1992–93	Anglo-Italian Cup	Final	(Italy) U.S. Cremonese	1–3 (N)

=== 1993–94 Anglo-Italian Cup ===
Derby, now under the management of Roy McFarland failed to navigate the Preliminary Round of the 1993–94 Anglo Italian Cup, though the competition did feature the only time in history that the East Midlands derby has been held in European competition, with Derby winning 3–2.

Season	Competition	Round	Opposition	Score
1993–94	Anglo-Italian Cup	Preliminary Round	(England) Notts County	2–3 (A)
1993–94	Anglo-Italian Cup	Preliminary Round	(England) Nottingham Forest	3–2 (H)

=== 1994–95 Anglo-Italian Cup ===
Derby's most recent European campaign came in the 1994–95 season, the last year of McFarland's management tenure. The club was not part of the 1995–96 competition, which proved to be its last. By this point gates had descended to around 2,000 and the competition was considered more of a distraction than a viable opportunity of European competition for second tier clubs.

Season	Competition	Round	Opposition	Score
1994–95	Anglo-Italian Cup	Group B	(Italy) Ancona	1–2 (A)
1994–95	Anglo-Italian Cup	Group B	(Italy) Cesena	6–1 (H)
1994–95	Anglo-Italian Cup	Group B	(Italy) Piacenza	1–1 (A)
1994–95	Anglo-Italian Cup	Group B	(Italy) Udinese	3–1 (H)

=== 2019-20 UEFA Youth League ===
Derby qualified as they were the champions of the 2018-19 U18 Premier League. After winning their first two ties, the club progressed to the knockout stages. They defeated German giants Borussia Dortmund 3-1 in the playoffs but were eliminated from the competition at the Round of 16 stage after losing 4-1 away to Austrian side Salzburg.

Season	Competition	Round	Opposition	Score
2019-20	UEFA Youth League	First Round	(Belarus) FC Minsk	2-0 (A), 7-2 (H)
2019-20	UEFA Youth League	Second Round	(Iceland) ÍA	2-1 (A), 4-1 (H)
2019-20	UEFA Youth League	Playoffs	(Germany) Borussia Dortmund	3-1 (H)
2019-20	UEFA Youth League	Round of 16	(Austria) Salzburg	1-4 (A)

== Overall record ==
Competition	Pld	W	D	L	GF	GA	GD
Texaco Cup	8	5	2	1	18	9	+9
European Cup	12	6	2	4	18	12	+6
UEFA Cup	10	5	2	3	32	18	+14
Anglo-Italian Cup	15	9	1	5	38	24	+14
UEFA Youth League	6	5	0	1	19	9	+10
Total	51	30	7	14	125	72	+53
