= Cammy Duncan =

Scottish footballer

Personal information
- Full name: Cameron Duncan
- Date of birth: 4 August 1965
- Place of birth: Shotts, Scotland
- Date of death: 2 May 2017 (aged 51)
- Place of death: Airdrie, Scotland
- Height: 6 ft 1 in (1.85 m)
- Position: Goalkeeper

Youth career
- 1984–1985: Sunderland

Senior career*
Years	Team	Apps	(Gls)
1985–1987	Sunderland	1	(0)
1987–1989	Motherwell	60	(0)
1989–1991	Partick Thistle	45	(0)
1991–1996	Ayr United	148	(0)
1996–1997	Albion Rovers	10	(0)
Total		264	(0)
- * Club domestic league appearances and goals

Cameron Duncan (4 August 1965 – 2 May 2017) was a Scottish footballer, who played as a goalkeeper.

Duncan started his career with Sunderland, where he only made a single Football League appearance. He then returned to Scotland with Motherwell and later played for Partick Thistle, Ayr United, and Albion Rovers.

Duncan died on 2 May 2017 from cancer.
