= Kate's Well =

Coordinates: 55°50′47″N 3°51′04″W

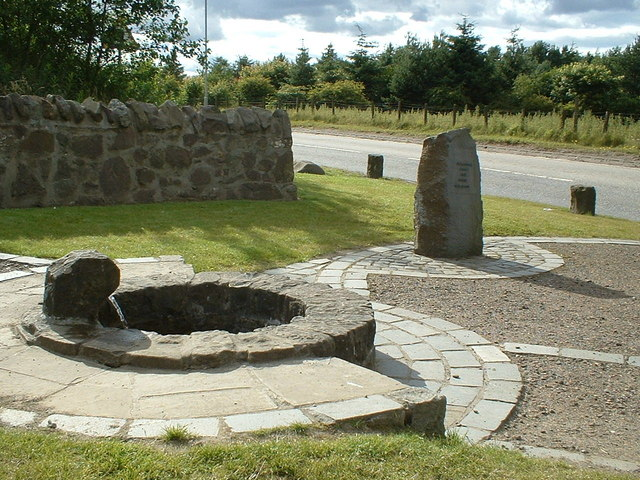
Kate's Well

St. Catherine's Well or Kate's Well is a historical natural spring well of significant interest and sits on holy ground, at the foot of Kirk O' Shotts Parish Church, otherwise known as (Shottskirk) in the village of Salsburgh, North Lanarkshire. The well dates back to the 15th century, and derives from the church's former past when it was once a Catholic place of worship as St. Catherines Chapel, which has origins from Catherine of Sienna.

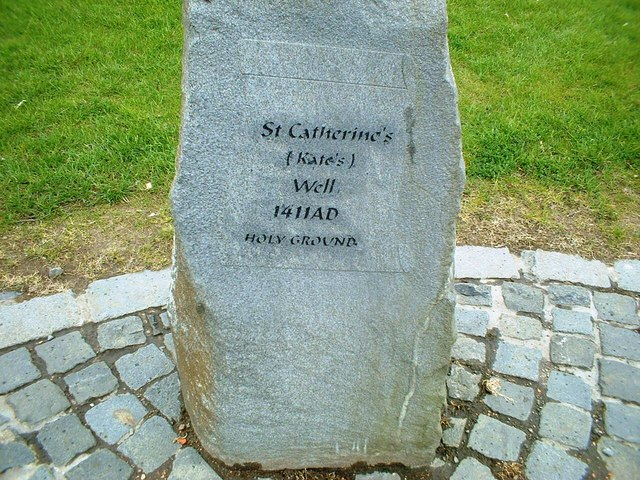
The stone pillar

The water runs off from nearby hills and has a jovial longstanding joke within the nearby village of how the water runs through the Shottskirk cemetery bodies, which of course is neither true or founded.

Kate's Well is also the scene of the local legendary giant Bertram de Shotts's demise; a gripping tale is told how a young man, namely Willielmo De Muirhead, 1st Laird of Muirhead, killed the Giant. With cunning patience he ambushed Bertram de Shotts, immobilising him by slicing both his hamstrings as he lay down to drink at Kate's Well. Disorientated, Bertram de Shotts was then decapitated in an unpleasant death. A proud, and now wealthy, De Muirhead then carried the blooded head to the King and was rewarded with a 'Hawk's Flight' of land. This land subsequently became Muirhead's Lauchope estate.

The well itself received a much needed boost through a grant organized thanks to the local Community Council group in the early 2000s, which allowed its extensive renovation.
