= Shotts Iron Works =

Scottish ironworks

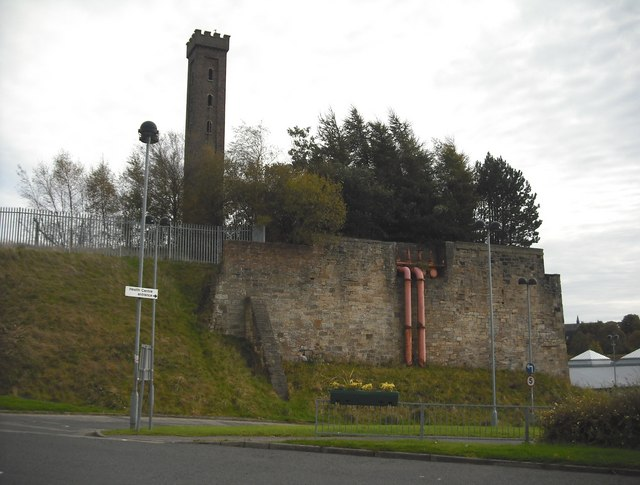
- Remains of the Shotts Iron Works
- Interactive map of the Shotts Iron Works area
- Alternative names: Shotts Iron Company

General information
- Location: North Lanarkshire, Shotts, Scotland
- Coordinates: 55°49′06″N 3°47′23″W
- Construction started: 1801

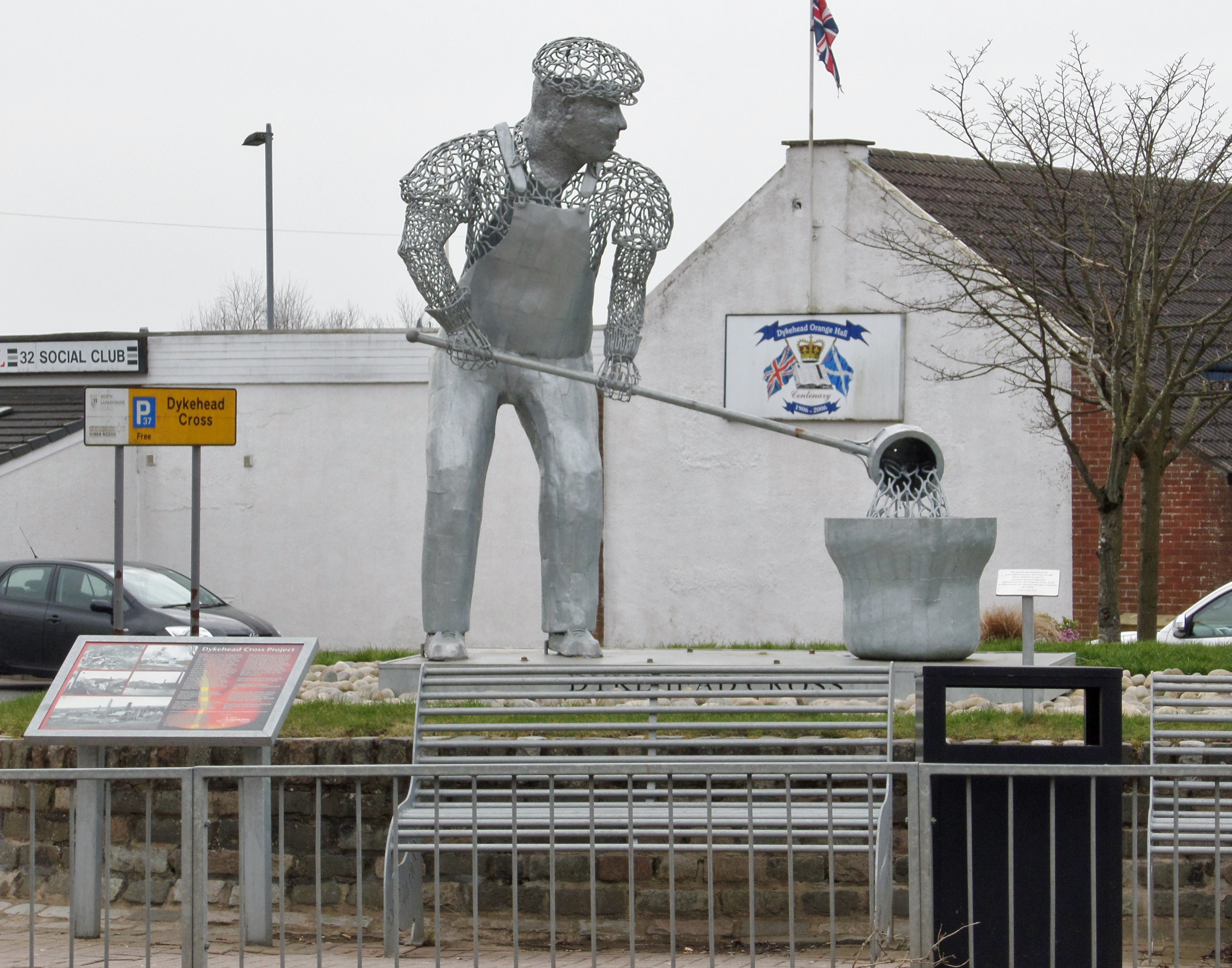
Statue commemorating the Shotts metal workers

Shotts Iron Works was established in 1801. The ample supply of coal, ironstone and lime in the Shotts area provided the raw ingredients required to produce pig iron. The iron works and associated extraction of raw materials was the main source of industry in Shotts for a period of over 150 years. Annual output of pig iron at Shotts reached a peak of 75,000 tons with a worldwide reputation for excellence of its foundry castings.

== History of Shotts Iron Works ==
On 16 April 1801, Robert and Hugh Baird, civil engineers based near Glasgow, obtained a lease of the minerals on either side of South Calder Water. Shotts Iron Company was formed that year when three more partners joined. The company was wound up in 1952 when an extraordinary general meeting of shareholders passed a resolution appointing joint liquidators.

=== Background to the company and directors ===
The Shotts Iron Company formed in 1801 consisted of Robert Baird, Hugh Baird, George Munro, Walter Logan and John Baird.

In 1810, Robert and Hugh Baird dropped out of the partnership and a New Shotts Iron Company was formed with the addition of Robert Bogle and John Blackburn.

In 1823, Shotts Iron Works was advertised for sale. Two rival groups made strong bids to take over the company. The winning group was led by John Horrocks and a new company was formed in 1824 with partners Walter Logan (from the old company) along with William Waddell, William Wilson Duffin, William Crawford, Francis Cameron, William Dun, James Reoch and George Crichton. Four trustees were appointed and a contract of co-partnery under the name of the Shotts Iron Joint Stock Company was set up.

== Furnace and blast tower ==
The furnace bank and hot blast tower are the only remaining surviving remains of the iron-smelting works. Historic Environment Scotland has given a B grade category to these buildings in recognition of their significance to the history and heritage of Central Scotland. Shotts Iron Company was one of the early iron-smelting works in the region, and one of the last to remain in operation. The furnace bank is one of three surviving in Scotland.

Both buildings are listed on the Buildings at Risk Register for Scotland. Inspections have been carried out in February 2008, June 2010 and December 2014. Each inspection has found the furnace bank to be reasonably secured, but in need of repointing. The hot blast tower also has pointing and internal timber ladders in poor condition. The entrance to the tower has suffered damage from a large stone having dislodged from the wall.

== Castlehill Iron Works (1838-1884) ==
Castlehill Iron Works was owned by Shotts Iron Works and was situated in the Castlehill area of Carluke. At its most busy time, the Iron Works had three furnaces in blast. Coal was supplied to the Works from the nearby Castlehill Colliery, also owned by Shotts Iron Works. Houses for the workers were situated nearby and included 'Furnace Row', while the agent for the Iron Works lived in Castlehill House. Kerrfield House was the home of the manager of Castlehill colliery, and next door in the same building was the station master of the busy goods station which was near the junction of Castlehill Road and Airdrie Road. While Furnace Row has long since disappeared, Castlehill and Kerrfield Houses are still in use and occupied.
