= Jocky Whiteford =

Scottish footballer

Personal information
- Full name: John Irvine Whiteford
- Date of birth: 24 January 1951 (age 75)
- Place of birth: Shotts, Scotland
- Position: Forward

Youth career
- Airdrie Academy

Senior career*
Years	Team	Apps	(Gls)
1968–1973	Airdrie	37	(6)
1973–1976	Falkirk	87	(43)
1976–1979	Dumbarton	62	(35)
- Rutherglen Glencairn
- * Club domestic league appearances and goals

John Irvine "Jocky" Whiteford (born 24 January 1951) is a Scottish former footballer who played for Airdrieonians, Falkirk and Dumbarton.

His father Jock, elder brother Davie (a teammate at Falkirk and Glencairn, and coaching colleague at East Stirlingshire) and cousin Derek Whiteford (a teammate at Airdrie and Dumbarton) were also footballers.
