= Jim Rodger (journalist) =

Scottish sports journalist

James Malcolm Rodger OBE (13 March 1922 – 2 January 1997) also known as Jim Rodger, Scoop and the Jolly, was a renowned Scottish sports journalist awarded the OBE in 1989 for his services to journalism and work for charity.

Rodger was born and lived his whole life in the town of Shotts in North Lanarkshire. He began his working life as a coalminer, and following an injury found himself in a Lanarkshire rehabilitation centre with Jock Stein, who had also injured himself in the pits. Forced to give up mining, he found his way into newspapers and his fifty year career saw him write for the Wishaw Press(1944), Glasgow Evening News(abt 1948), Daily Record(1954), Daily Express(1965), and finally the Daily Mirror(1974) where he worked until his retirement in 1984. He continued to write freelance for the Mirror right up until his death in 1997. Mirror editor Piers Morgan hailed him as one of the outstanding journalists of his generation.

== Charitable and voluntary works ==
Over forty years Rodger also helped generate income of at least half a million pounds for journalists and their dependants going through difficult times. He played a leading role both in the West of Scotland branch, and at national level in the Newspaper Press Fund, organising numerous campaigns and fund-raising lunches with high profile speakers. He was also a Justice of the Peace and was on Shotts Prison Liaison Committee, campaigning for better facilities for prison visitors, and for a prison football team to be entered into the Lanarkshire league.

== Connections and influence ==
Rodger was known to have great influence among some of the most important people in the sporting world with Sir Matt Busby, Bill Shankly, Bill Nicholson and Jock Stein among his closest friends. His extensive network of football and other contacts was largely based on befriending the star players of tomorrow and their families early in their career, and remaining a trusted friend and mentor throughout it. Alex Ferguson said: "I had the privilege of knowing Jim for 40 years. Football people always tended to be critical of those in the media, but no-one I know ever had a bad word for Jim."

Rodger was often known to act as a sort of unpaid agent or fixer, secretly brokering transfer deals and management moves, earning him numerous exclusives or ‘scoops’ with which his name became synonymous. He claimed responsibility for Jock Stein's move into management at Dunfermline in 1960, Willie Waddell's move to manage Kilmarnock in 1957 and Alex Ferguson's move to Aberdeen in 1978.

However, his contacts ranged far beyond just football. Prime Ministers, politicians from all parties, and religious leaders all knew him. He was reportedly related to Lord Armstrong of Sanderstead, head of the Civil Service and chairman of the Midland Bank, and was a close friend of Sir David McNee former Commissioner of the Metropolitan Police. His work for the National Press Fund also brought him into regular contact with top politicians such as Harold Wilson, Margaret Thatcher, James Callaghan, John Major, Denis Healey and Tony Blair.

== Death ==
Rodger died aged 74 on 2 January 1997 having reported on the New Year Old Firm match the previous evening. He was laid to rest at a packed Wishaw Baptist Church, where Sir David McNee paid tribute to "an outstanding Scot". The funeral was attended by a Who's Who of British football, many of whom were close friends. These included Manchester United boss Alex Ferguson, Kenny Dalglish, Bobby Charlton, Graeme Souness, Walter Smith, Tommy Burns, Ally McCoist, John Greig, Billy Stark, Billy McNeil, Danny McGrain, Joe McBride, Sean Fallon, Charlie Nicholas, Joe Jordan, Richard Gough and Jim Baxter.

Boxing promoters Tommy Gilmour, Alex Morrison and former world champion Paul Weir also attended.

Labour MPs Helen Liddell and John Reid were joined by Strathclyde Chief Constable John Orr. Cardinal Winning was represented by Catholic press spokesman Father Tom Connelly due to illness.

=== Tributes ===
On hearing of his death Tony Blair, leader of the opposition at the time said:

"Jim Rodger was legendary. He was absolutely committed to journalism, to sport, to Scotland and above all to people.He had acute political antennae and was one of the most remarkable organisers of our time. He was never off the phone with suggestions.” "Shortly after I became leader I arrived to speak at a lunch in Glasgow. I was met by Jim who said 'don't worry, leave everything to me son'. He took me into a room full of well-known people from sport, politics, the church and business, and proceeded to wheel them in and out at an incredible rate. Whether it was the manager of Manchester United or a leading churchman they were happy to have him order them around. He will be very sadly missed."

Prime Minister John Major said:

"I was very sorry to hear of Jim Rodger's sudden death. He was in fine form when last we met at a Press Fund reception in London some weeks ago. He will be sadly missed for his fine contribution to sports writing – which he continued right up to his death – and most particularly for his tireless fundraising for the NPF."

George Robertson Shadow Scottish Secretary described Jim as "an immense character" adding that :

"He was a kindly man, but also a deeply committed and passionate man. He leaves a huge hole in Scottish public life."

Donald Dewar said:

"Jim was a remarkable man, a real one-off and he will be greatly missed with his tremendous knowledge of Scottish football. A lot of us will miss his small, round presence warning of events to come and to enrol help for his campaign of the moment. He was a great character and much-loved."

Head of the Catholic Church in Scotland at the time Cardinal Thomas Winning said:

"Jim will be sadly missed by all who knew him. He had a gift of coming to the rescue of others in so many different ways."

- In 1997 the Jim Rodger Memorial Award was set up in the wake of Jim’s death. It is awarded annually to sports writers in Scotland under the age of 35, and is supported by newspapers and the Journalists' Charity, formerly known as the Newspaper Press Fund.
- In 1998 the new media centre within Scotland's national football stadium Hampden Park was named the Jim Rodger Media Centre in his honour.
- Two books by Tom Purdie containing photographs from a large collection taken by Jim Rodger during his career have since been published, focussing on Scottish football in the 1950s and 1960's. The foreword of each is written by Alex Ferguson.
