= Willie McSeveney =

Scottish footballer (1929–2021)

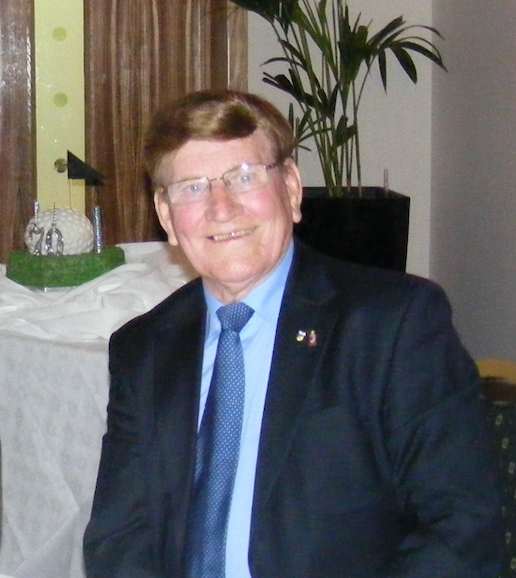

Personal information
- Full name: William James McSeveney
- Date of birth: 4 March 1929
- Place of birth: Shotts, Scotland
- Date of death: 15 December 2021 (aged 92)
- Height: 5 ft 11 in (1.80 m)
- Position: Defender

Youth career
- Shotts YMCA Boys Club
- Wishaw Juniors

Senior career*
Years	Team	Apps	(Gls)
1948–1954	Dunfermline Athletic	99	(19)
1954–1963	Motherwell	256	(28)

Managerial career
- 1964–1974: Motherwell (reserves coach)
- 1974–1978: Shotts Bon Accord
- * Club domestic league appearances and goals

William James McSeveney (4 March 1929 – 15 December 2021) was a Scottish footballer best known for his time at Motherwell Football Club the 1950s and 1960s.

== Early life and career ==
McSeveney was born and lived his whole life in Shotts. He began playing football in his youth, joining the YMCA Boys Club, and subsequently Wishaw Juniors. He had three younger brothers, John, David and Bobby who also played football.

He worked as a painter and decorator, balancing his trade with his football ambitions. His senior career commenced in September 1948 at the age of 19, when he joined another Shotts footballer Freddie Westbrook by signing with Dunfermline Athletic, which was managed by Bobby Ancell. During the 1949–50 season, McSeveney's career was interrupted by National Service, during which he played for the RAF Command team in Stranraer.

== Motherwell Career ==
In March 1954, McSeveney transferred to Motherwell, shortly before Ancell was appointed as the club's manager in 1955. Over the course of more than a decade at Fir Park, McSeveney became a pivotal figure and served as captain of the team, which featured notable players such as Ian St John, Bert McCann, Pat Quinn and John Martis. This team was commonly referred to as the Ancell Babes. He was known for being versatile and played in every position except goalkeeper. Throughout his ten seasons with Motherwell, he made 256 appearances, including in the 1954 Scottish League Cup Final and a notable match in 1960 against Brazilian club Flamengo, where Motherwell won 9–2.

== Post-playing career ==
Following the conclusion of his playing career in 1964, McSeveney transitioned into coaching and took charge of the Motherwell reserves until 1974. Subsequently, he managed Shotts Bon Accord from 1974 to 1978 and later worked as a scout for Sheffield United. In 1966, he started working at Parklea Limited in Hamilton as a supervisor, a company specialising in paint and powder coating for metal, and he rose to the position of director in 1982.

== Death ==
He died on 15 December 2021, at the age of 92 and is buried at Benhar Cemetery, Shotts.
