= Shottskirk =

Scottish local parish church

Coordinates: 55.84583°N 3.84988°W

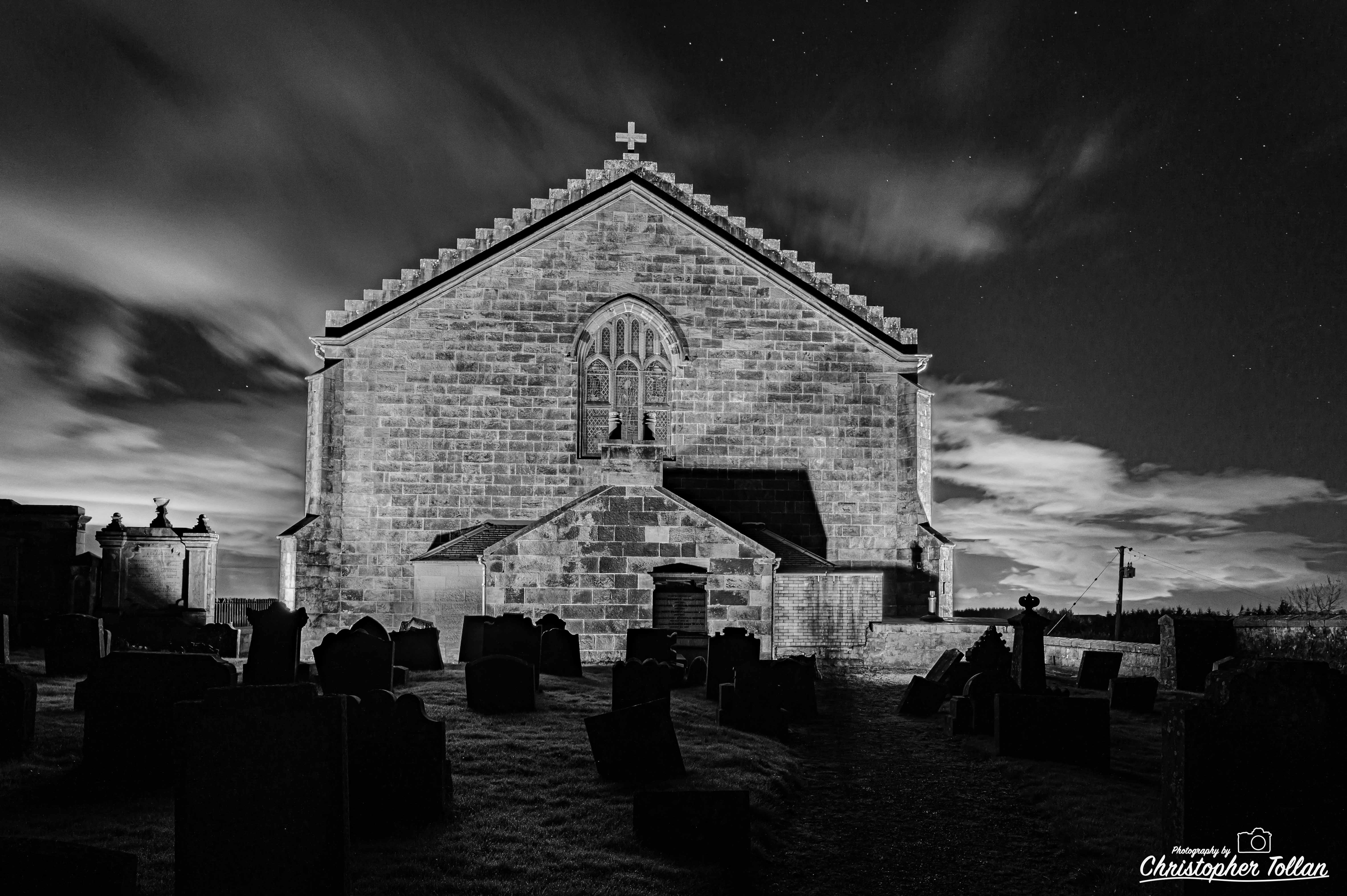
The Kirk o'Shotts or Shottskirk

Shottskirk, more commonly known as Kirk O'Shotts Parish Church, or affectionately "The M8 Church", is a local parish church located in Salsburgh, North Lanarkshire, Scotland, and serves the village of Salsburgh, the town of Shotts and the hamlets in between. The last dedicated minister for this church was Rev. Sheila Spence who retired in 2010.

== About the church ==
The church is still operational and is a category B listed building. It can be seen from the nearby M8 motorway and is often illuminated at night. The graveyard contains stones from as early as 1624. The nearby Fortissat area contains the remains of the Fortissat Stone, a Covenanter gathering place. Shotts itself contains several Covenanter monuments as does nearby Harthill and Allanton.

Kirk O' Shotts, or the more affectionate title "The M8 Church" for its location on a hillock alongside the busy M8 motorway between Glasgow and Edinburgh, was formerly a Catholic place of worship under the name Saint Catherine's Chapel.

Close to 550 years ago Bothwell and Shotts formed one parish which stretched from the Clyde to Linlithgowshire, and from the North to the South Calder. In this large area there were four places of worship, one of which was situated in the middle Bothwellmuir at “a desert place called Bertram-Shotts”. Bertram de Shotts was reputed to be a giant who lived in the area and terrorised travellers on the Glasgow/Edinburgh road. A reward was offered for his capture - dead or alive - which was claimed by William Muirhead who lay in wait for Bertram when the latter came to his favourite drinking place, a spring of water on the hillside above Shottsburn. He hamstrung him and, as the giant lay laughing up at him, he cut off his head with the words, “Will ye laugh-up yet?”

It was on Bertram's plot of land that St. Catherine's Chapel was built in 1450. It was dedicated to “the blessed Virgin and Catherine of Sienna”.

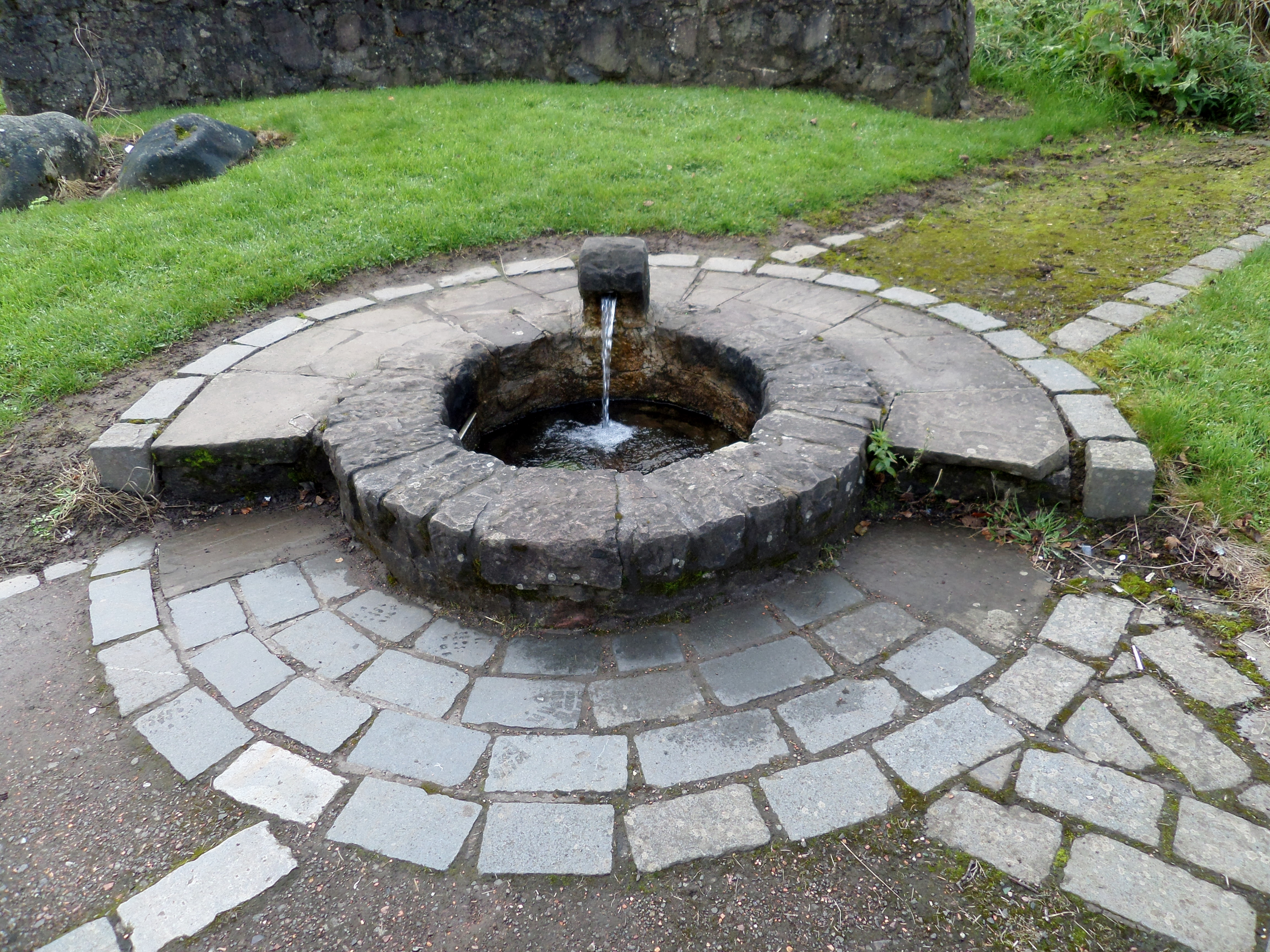
Kate or St Catherine's Well

Many have wondered what connection St. Catherine could possibly have with the area. In 1457 the parish of Shotts was detached from Bothwell barony and the eastern half was given to Lord Hamilton, who re-founded and probably rededicated the chapel, also founding a hospital at the same place for the reception of the poor, which he endowed with some lands from Kinneal. His foundation was confirmed by a Bull of Pope Sixtus IV, on 30 April 1476 – St. Catherine's Feast Day. This may be the reason for the name.

== Changes at the chapel ==
After the Reformation of 1560, Kirk o’Shotts became a Protestant place of worship. The old church of St Catherine's must have suffered many changes and required frequent changes since its foundation, but of these there is no account before 1640. In that year the Presbytery met at Shotts and ordered that the church be repaired and partly rebuilt, but it was more than eight years before the work was completed.

The site of the old church is marked by the headstone erected to Samuel Meuros, who was session clerk and school master from 1794 to 1837. He was also Precentor, and it was his wish to be buried where his old desk had stood. On the back of the stone is the following inscription:

“Here stood the Precentor’s desk in the Kirk of Bertram Shotts which was rebuilt and extended in 1642” . This stone and the burial ground of the Inglis's of Murdoston, which was inside the old church, give a clear idea of the site.

The old church was a long, narrow building about 70 feet long, 25 feet wide, with 16 feet at the east end, designated the ‘quire’. The pulpit and desk stood on the south side, fronting the pulpit was the common loft, in the east end was Murdoston's loft, and at the west end was Gartness loft. In 1817, the old church having become unsafe and having a seating capacity for only 409 worshippers, it was decided that a larger church with a seating capacity for approximately 1,200 should be built.

== New building ==
The present church building was opened on 26 October 1821, at a cost of £2,270. Its spire was struck by lightning and completely destroyed on 23 July 1876. The only material link with the old church is the old sandstone baptismal font. It was lost for a number of years, but subsequently found in a pigsty, where it was being used as a feeding trough. After being cleaned and rededicated, it is still used for baptisms today.

From 1841, the population of the parish rapidly increased and, with this increase, there was a demand for more churches. The following were opened:

- Calderhead Church (1860)
- Harthill and Benhar (1877)
- Cleland Church (1878)
- Caldercruix (1893)

== The Shotts Revival ==
On Monday 21 June 1630, the celebrated Revival took place. It had been arranged that John Livingstone, then a probationer, should preach in the kirkyard that morning after the Communion weekend. He preached on the text Ezekiel 36:25–26,

"Then will I sprinkle clean water upon you, and ye shall be clean: from all your filthiness, and from all your idols, will I cleanse you. A new heart also will I give you, and a new spirit will I put within you: and I will take away the stony heart out of your flesh, and I will give you an heart of flesh."

His sermon, which lasted for two and a half hours, was much used by God and changed the hearts of five hundred people that morning. He preached for many years after that, but said that he never again witnessed such a melting of hearts as he did that day in Shotts lonely kirkyard. According to Robert Fleming's account of those days, 'Many were so choked and taken by the heart in hearing the word they have been made to fall over... who afterwards proved most solid and useful Christians.'

== Covenanters ==
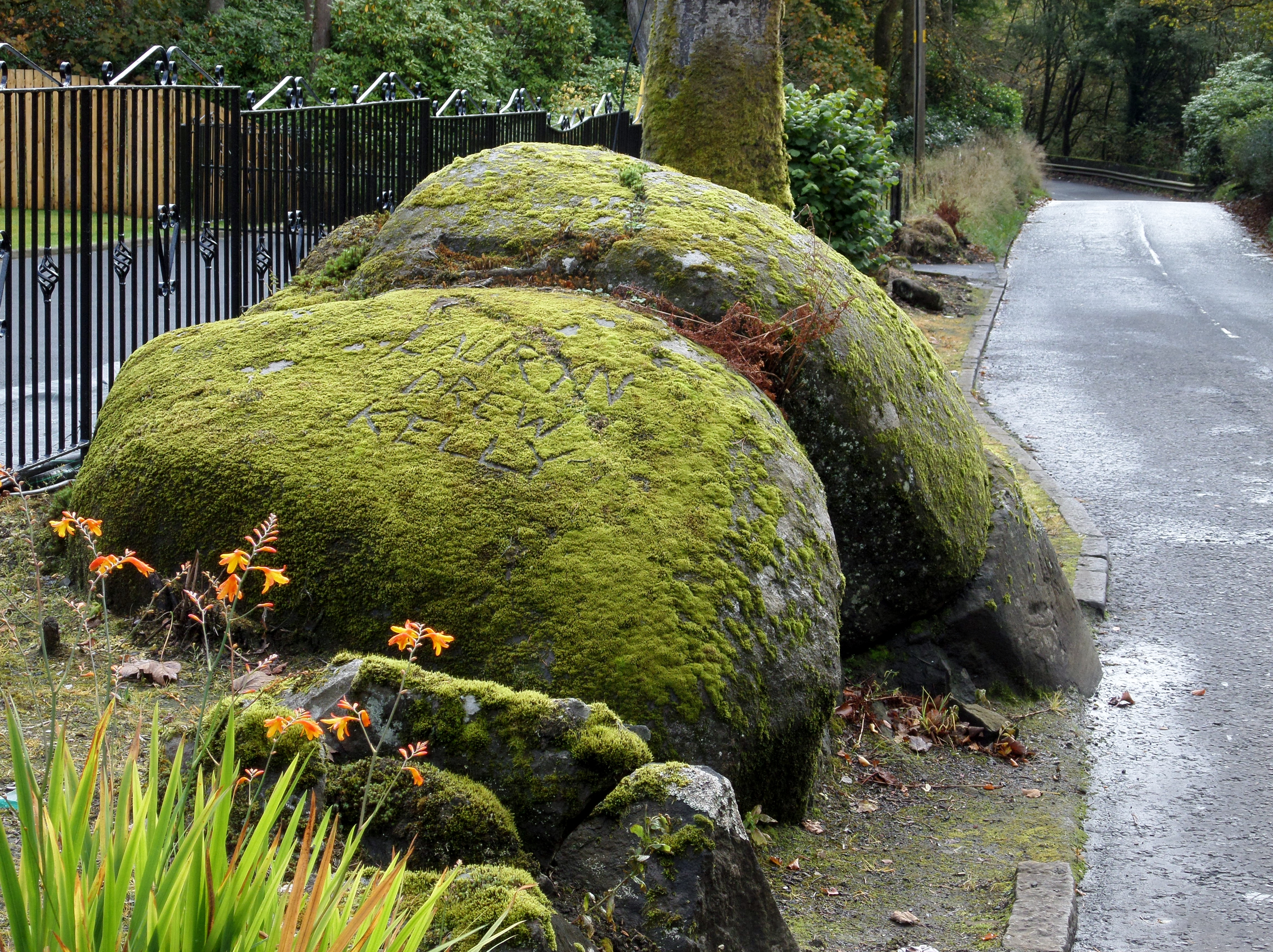
The Fortissat Covenanter's Stone

From the signing of the National Covenant in 1638 to the Revolution in 1688, the struggle between Presbyterianism and the Episcopacy went on until it reached its height in the killing times - 1684-1685. Shotts and the adjoining parishes of Monkland and Cambusnethan were strong supporters of the Covenant, and many conventicles were held within their bounds. The principal place for field preachings in the parish of Shotts was on a large moss between Benhar and Starryshaw. It was here at a place once known as the "Deer Slunk" that Donald Cargill preached on the Sunday after Richard Cameron's death, 26 July 1681. John Kidd also preached here to a large, armed conventicle. Nearby is the large whinstone boulder which has been known since the time of the martyred Alexander Peden as ‘Peden’s Stane’.

There is a Covenanter's stone in the kirk yard to a certain William Smith, who fought at Rullion Green in the Pentlands in 1666. In 1678, the Duke of Monmouth, with an army of 10,000 men, camped for ten days at Muirhead, about three miles east of Kirk o’Shotts. They were on their way by the old bridle road, to Bothwell Bridge where they defeated the Covenanters. It is reckoned that 160 Shotts men took part in the battle; 13 were killed and 33 taken prisoner.

== The Patronage Act ==
The Patronage Act 1711, which transferred the right of electing ministers from congregations to the patron, caused a great deal of trouble in the parish. There were at least two forced settlements, the better known that of Rev. Lawrence Wells. His settlement was so unpopular that a number left the church and joined the seceders who in time built a church at Shottsburn. It was not until 1975 that this group returned to the fold by returning to Kirk o’ Shotts.

== The last (unshared) minister ==
In 1979 the Reverend Sheila Spence became this church's minister. She had been one of the six women who had published an open letter to the Church of Scotland to request that women could be ministers. That right was allowed the following year in 1968. The Rev Spence retired in 2010 but she continued as a locum until 2014. The manse where she lived was sold as it was agreed that the church would share the next minister.

== Haunted graveyard ==
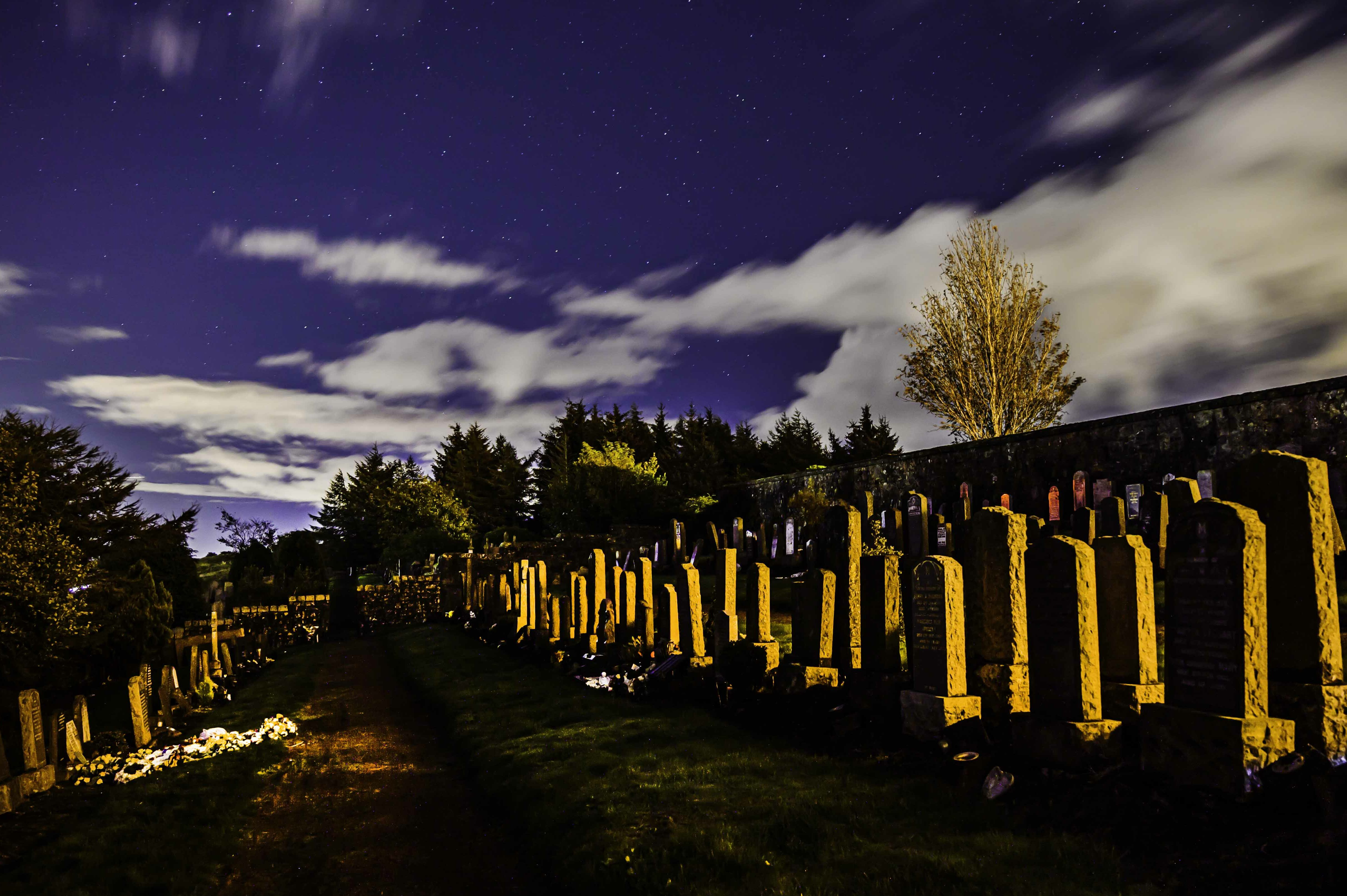

The graveyard of the Church is allegedly haunted. A driver reported having hit a mysterious grey dressed man or woman on the road which runs aside the church (the B7066). However, when the driver got out to check on the injured person they had vanished into the mist they appeared from.

== St. Catherine's Well or "Kate's Well" ==
St. Catherine's Well or Kate's Well is a historical natural spring well of significant interest and sits on holy ground at the foot of Kirk O' Shott's Parish Church. The well dates back to the 14th century and derives from the church's former past when it was once a Catholic place of worship as St. Catherines Chapel which has origins from Catherine of Sienna.
