= Bertram de Shotts =

Bertram de Shotts is known locally as a legendary giant that roamed the then village of Shotts, Scotland in the 15th century.

== Mythology ==
Shotts was then a dreary moorland place on the Great Road of the Shire. The road was an important route for tradesmen carrying their wares around Scotland. Bertram de Shotts habitually savaged packmen and peddlers for treasure carried along the Great Road. Such was the menace of Bertram de Shotts, King James IV of Scotland ordered his death. Bertram de Shotts was probably in fact 7 or 8 ft. high, yet nonetheless, his presence merited Giant status.

A gripping tale is told how a young man, namely Willielmo De Muirhead, 1st Laird of Muirhead, killed the Giant. With cunning patience he ambushed Bertram de Shotts, immobilising him by slicing both his hamstrings as he lay down to drink at a part of the Shottsburn, now known as Bertram’s Well, in the then-known Sallysburgh (now Salsburgh). Disorientated, Bertram de Shotts was then decapitated in an unpleasant death. A proud and now wealthy man, De Muirhead then carried the bloodied head to the King and was rewarded with a 'Hawk's Flight' of land. This land subsequently became Muirhead's Lauchope estate.

A relic of Bertram’s exploits is still to be seen in one of his hide-outs, Law’s Castle, known to old residents as the Giant’s Cup and Saucer. They are huge stones, standing sentinel in a desolate moorland bowl, in an unutterable silence, brooding and age-old.

Despite Bertram de Shotts being a savage thief, the village Shotts is said, in a local tale, to have derived its name from the legendary Giant. This story, however, is considered to be apocryphal.

Bertram is believed to have lived from around 1467 to 1505.

== See also ==
- Salsburgh
- Kirk O' Shotts Parish Church / Shottskirk
- Kate's Well
