= Derek Whiteford =

Scottish footballer and manager

Personal information
- Full name: David Whiteford
- Date of birth: 13 May 1947
- Place of birth: Salsburgh, Scotland
- Date of death: 2002 (aged 54–55)
- Place of death: Shotts, Scotland
- Height: 6 ft 2 in (1.88 m)
- Position: Midfielder

Senior career*
Years	Team	Apps	(Gls)
- Broxburn Athletic
1964–1967	Hibernian	1	(0)
1967–1977	Airdrieonians	316	(80)
1977–1979	Dumbarton	78	(24)
1979–1980	Falkirk	12	(2)
Total		407	(106)

Managerial career
- 1981–1982: Albion Rovers
- 1986: Dumbarton
- 1986–1987: Airdrieonians
- * Club domestic league appearances and goals

David "Derek" Whiteford (born 13 May 1947 in Salsburgh) was a Scottish football player and manager. He played for Hibernian, Airdrieonians, Dumbarton and Falkirk.

Whiteford started his senior career with Hibernian, but was unable to establish himself in the first team and was given a free transfer. He signed for Airdrie and served the club with distinction, making over 400 total appearances including the 1975 Scottish Cup Final in which he was captain (lost to Celtic) as well as winning 1973–74 Scottish Division Two title and 1976 Spring Cup, plus another runner-up medal from the 1971–72 Texaco Cup. In 2016 he was voted into the Diamonds 'Greatest XI' by supporters.

After retiring as a player, Whiteford managed Albion Rovers, Dumbarton (alongside Alex Wright) and then Airdrieonians. He resigned as Airdrie manager in 1987 because he lost enjoyment for the game, and decided to concentrate on his then principal career as a physical education teacher.

Whiteford died in 2002, aged 54. His uncle Jock and cousins Davie and Jocky Whiteford (a teammate at Airdrie and Dumbarton) were also footballers.

== Managerial statistics ==
Team	From	To	Record				
Team	From	To	G	W	D	L	Win %
Albion Rovers	December 1981	November 1982	44	13	9	22	29.55
Dumbarton	February 1986	May 1986	17	6	5	6	35.29
Airdrieonians	August 1986	May 1987	47	20	12	15	42.55
Total			108	39	26	43	36.11
