= Torbothie =

Coordinates: 55°49′10″N 3°46′34″W

Torbothie is a small area in the town of Shotts, North Lanarkshire. Shotts has an overall population of approximately 8,570. Torbothie has a mixture of properties including council-letted accommodations and private dwellings, a Salvation Army Corps, a graveyard, large areas of forestry, a football ground, and Stane Primary School, as well as a small man made loch called The Voe, also known locally and informally as 'Torbothie Beach.' Torbothie is close to Springhill, Stane and Dykehead, which are other areas of the town of Shotts. Torbothie means "the bothie on the hill".

== History ==
There were once 22 mines in Shotts, a few of which were in Torbothie, Southfield for example was one, but they were shut down in the 1960s.

== Torbothie Culture and Wildlife ==
The local wildlife is varied, ranging from local birds to animals like foxes, and roe deer. Rabbits are not uncommon. Badgers have been sighted, as well as the occasional squirrel.

Torbothie is populated generally by mixed class families. Its culture is mostly made up by white Scots.

== The Voe ==
The Voe is a man-made body of water situated just to the North of Torbothie Road. It was created by damming the upper Calder Water to create a source of cooling for the now-demolished Shotts Ironworks Ltd. Abandoned and ruined stone structures are dotted around it. It is suitable for fishing, with common fish including pike and perch. Young people often ride their bikes to the beach.

== Economy ==
The nearest amenities are situated at the Stane, on Main Street, where there is access to multiple convenience stores, a cafe, hairdresser and multiple takeaways. In the centre of Shotts there is a local Co-Operative supermarket, butchers, bakers, newsagents, garages, a pharmacy and several take-aways and small convenience shops scattered throughout Shotts. There is also a public library, a leisure centre and a health centre.

== Memorable Events ==
Every year Shotts holds a Gala Day, situated in the Brandy Park in Torbothie. Much of Torbothie's population can be found here, where a Gala Queen is crowned, people make speeches, and a number of fairground attractions can be enjoyed.

In 1999, Stane Primary School was burnt down due to an act of vandalism, and the pupils were sent to Eastfield Primary until the New Stane Primary was rebuilt in 2003.

== Local Bus Services ==
From Torbothie, the local bus service is the number 365: Torbothie–Wishaw General Hospital, operated Mon–Sat by Stuarts of Carluke, on behalf of SPT. A short walk allows access to more services offered by other local operators to destinations such as Hamilton (First Glasgow 266), Motherwell (JMB Travel 56) and Livingston-for-Edinburgh (First Scotland East X22)
