= Willie Hannah =

Scottish footballer

Personal information
- Full name: William King Hannah
- Date of birth: 6 August 1921
- Place of birth: Shotts, Scotland
- Date of death: 1978 (aged 56–57) (Note: Litster gives a death date of 30 June 1978, while Hugman lists September of that year. Primary sources confirm the death was registered in the September quarter of 1978, which is consistent with either suggested date.)
- Place of death: Preston, England
- Position: Inside forward

Senior career*
Years	Team	Apps	(Gls)
1943–1944	Polkemmet		
1944–1947	Albion Rovers	26	(10)
1947–1951	Preston North End	15	(4)
1951–1954	Barrow	106	(16)
- * Club domestic league appearances and goals

William King Hannah (6 August 1921 – 1978) was a Scottish professional footballer who made 26 Scottish League appearances for Albion Rovers and 121 appearances in the English Football League playing as an inside forward for Preston North End and Barrow.

Hannah was born in Shotts, Lanarkshire, in 1921 and died in Preston, Lancashire, in 1978.
