= Hugh May (footballer) =

Scottish footballer (1882–1944)

Personal information
- Full name: Hugh May
- Date of birth: 13 October 1882
- Place of birth: Dykehead, Scotland
- Date of death: 1944 (aged 61–62)
- Position: Centre forward

Senior career*
Years	Team	Apps	(Gls)
1898–1899	Montrose Works		
1899–1900	Wishaw United		
1900–1902	Rangers	0	(0)
1901	→ Wishaw United (loan)		
1902–1903	Derby County	6	(0)
1903	Fulham		
Total		6	(0)
- * Club domestic league appearances and goals

Hugh May (13 October 1882 – 1944) was a Scottish footballer who played in the Football League for Derby County.

His elder brother John was also a footballer and was capped by Scotland.
