= Sam Booth =

Scottish footballer

Personal information
- Full name: Samuel Stewart Booth
- Date of birth: 20 April 1926
- Place of birth: Shotts, Scotland
- Date of death: 25 September 1968 (aged 42)
- Place of death: Carluke, Scotland
- Position: Wing half

Senior career*
Years	Team	Apps	(Gls)
- Derry City
1951–1954	Exeter City	62	(0)
1954–1955	Bradford City	15	(0)
- Bideford
Total		77	(0)
- * Club domestic league appearances and goals

Samuel Stewart Booth (20 April 1926 – 25 September 1968) is a Scottish former professional footballer who played as a wing half.

== Career ==
Born in Shotts, Booth played for Derry City, Exeter City, Bradford City and Bideford.
