= Donald MacKintosh (VC) =

Recipient of the Victoria Cross (1896–1917)

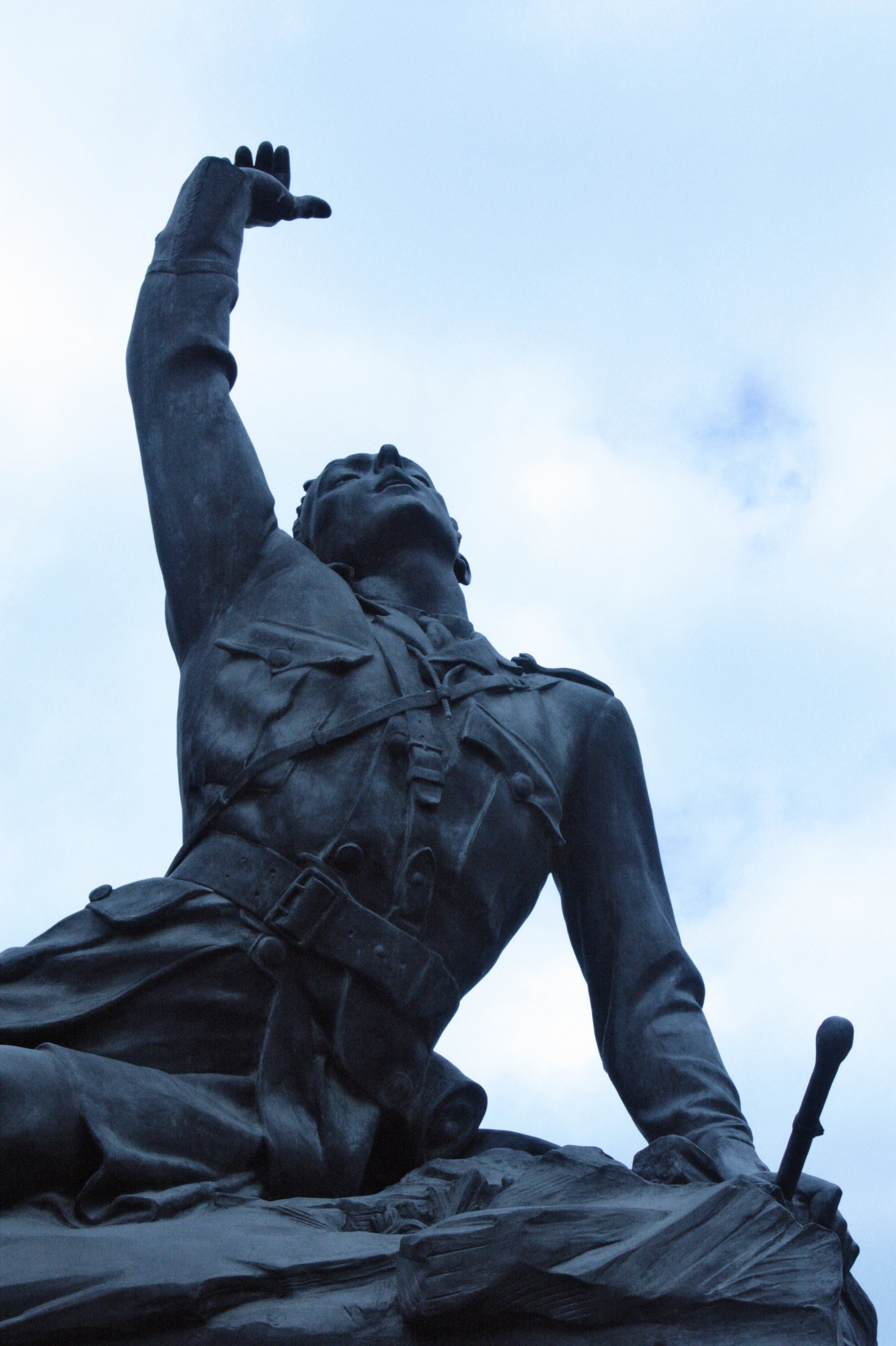
- Lieutenant MacKintosh's dying moments depicted on Fettes College war memorial
- Born: 7 February 1896; Glasgow, Scotland
- Died: 11 April 1917 (aged 21) near Fampoux, France
- Burial place: Brown's Copse Cemetery, Roeux
- Military career
- Allegiance: United Kingdom
- Branch: British Army
- Service years: 1914-1917 †
- Rank: Lieutenant
- Units: The Seaforth Highlanders
- Conflicts: World War I: Battle of Arras †
- Awards: Victoria Cross

Donald MacKintosh VC (7 February 1896 – 11 April 1917) was a Scottish recipient of the Victoria Cross, the highest and most prestigious award for gallantry in the face of the enemy that can be awarded to British and Commonwealth forces.

== Life ==
He was born in Glasgow on 7 February 1896, the son of Dr Donald James MacKintosh FRSE and his wife Margaret Fullarton. He and his mother went to live in Moffat while his father served in the Boer War, and he was then educated at St Ninian's Preparatory School, Moffat. When the family returned to Glasgow he attended Glasgow Academy.

He was then sent as a boarder to Fettes College in Edinburgh. Intending to study medicine at Glasgow University his plans were disrupted by the First World War and he instead enlisted in the Royal Army Medical Corps where he was posted to the 3rd Scottish General Hospital and quickly rose to Acting Sergeant. In February 1915 he received his commission and joined the Seaforth Highlanders. Sent to France he was severely wounded on 21 March 1916 and after treatment at Le Touquet Hospital was sent home to Britain for hospital care. He returned to his battalion in July 1916.

He was 21 years old, and a lieutenant in the 3rd Battalion, The Seaforth Highlanders (Ross-shire Buffs, Duke of Albany's), British Army during the Battle of Arras when the following deed took place for which he was awarded the VC.

On 11 April 1917 north of Fampoux, France, during the initial advance, Lieutenant Mackintosh was shot through the right leg, but although crippled, continued to lead his men, and captured the trench. He then collected men of another company who had lost their leader and drove back a counter-attack, when he was again wounded and although unable to stand, nevertheless continued to control the situation. With only 15 men left he ordered them to be ready to advance to the final objective and with great difficulty got out of the trench, encouraging them to advance. He was wounded yet again and fell.

He is buried in grave II.C.49 in Brown's Copse Cemetery near the village of Rouex, just north-east of Arras.

== Memorials ==
His dying moments are immortalised in Fettes College's War memorial, which features a statue of him urging his men onwards and bears the legend "Carry on".

== The medal ==
His Victoria Cross is displayed at The Highlanders Museum (Queen's Own Highlanders Collection), Fort George, Scotland
