= John Mulhall (footballer) =

Scottish footballer

Personal information
- Date of birth: 29 December 1900
- Place of birth: Dykehead, Shotts, Scotland
- Height: 5 ft 5 in (1.65 m)
- Position: Inside right

Senior career*
Years	Team	Apps	(Gls)
19??–1924	Cleland Juniors		
1924	Burnley	0	(0)
1924	Dykehead		
1924–1925	Brighton & Hove Albion	2	(0)
1925–1926	Falkirk		
1926–192?	Dykehead		
192?–1928	Fauldhouse United		
1928–1929	Bethlehem Steel	12	(5)
1928	→ Newark Skeeters (loan)	6	(1)
- * Club domestic league appearances and goals

John Mulhall (29 December 1900 – 1968) was a Scottish professional footballer who played as an inside right in the Scottish League for Dykehead and Falkirk, in the English Football League for Brighton & Hove Albion, and in the Eastern Professional Soccer League for Bethlehem Steel and Newark Skeeters.

== Life and career ==
Mulhall was born in Cleland, North Lanarkshire, in 1900. By the early 1920s, he was playing football for Cleland Juniors of the Lanarkshire League, and in August 1923, the Motherwell Times claimed that "few inside rights in the county [could] compare with John Mulhall, of Cleland Juniors, whose tricks are many and varied." That December, he went to try his luck in England with First Division club Burnley. Though impressing in their reserve team, he was unable to break through to the senior side and was given a free transfer.

He returned to Scotland with Dykehead of the Third Division. In October, an offer from Division One club Falkirk for Mulhall's services was rejected "as neither the club nor the player wished any change." There was also interest from other league clubs including Morton, and the Sunday Post called him "the most-wanted man in Third League football" and reported that comparisons had been made with Bobby Walker, the quick-footed former Hearts and Scotland forward. Within weeks, Mulhall decided he did wish a change after all and was back in England on trial with Brighton and Hove Albion of the Third Division South.

Brighton signed Mulhall for a fee of £225, of which a portion went to the player. He made his debut on 6 December 1924 in a goalless draw with Reading, appeared once more in another goalless draw, and was placed in the reserves. After five goals in his first two outings, he faded; reported to be suffering "acute homesickness", he returned to Scotland. He joined Falkirk ahead of the 1925–26 season, and "played his way into the first eleven", but was not retained. According to the Falkirk Herald, some would find his departure a matter for regret, as "he played many fine games for Falkirk last season, but his lack of inches was a handicap and sometimes he was inclined to spoil good work by clinging too long to the ball."

Mulhall returned to Dykehead for the 1926–27 season in the Scottish Football Alliance, the Third Division having folded, and then spent time with Fauldhouse United of the Scottish Intermediate League.

In August 1928, Mulhall went to the United States where he signed for Bethlehem Steel, who were then playing in the American Soccer League (ASL). He played just once before his club left the ASL and became a founder member of the breakaway Eastern Professional Soccer League (ESL) in a dispute over jurisdiction, dubbed the Soccer War. After two appearances in the new league, Mulhall was loaned to another ESL team, Newark Skeeters, for which he played six matches and scored once before being recalled. A dislocated arm kept him out for some weeks, and he finished the season with five goals from eleven ESL matches.
