= Tom Duncan (artist) =

Scottish-born artist and sculptor

Tom Duncan is a Scottish-born mixed-media artist and sculptor who lives and works in New York City.

== Biography ==
Tom Duncan was born in July 1939 in Shotts, Scotland at the start of World War II. Duncan's interest in model-making and creative studies was fostered from a very early age through the support of his father and Aunt Meg. Both provided him with basic materials and found objects and built small toys and models with him.

In 1947, his mother immigrated with Duncan and his brother to New York City where Duncan has remained since. Duncan began working at the Port Authority creating models after graduating from high school, despite a lack of formal training. Given his inherent talent, his supervisor encouraged him to enroll in art school and in 1959 Duncan enrolled in the Art Students League of New York and the National Academy Design School of Fine Art. Duncan continues to live and work in New York with Lisa Dinhofer.

== Work ==
Duncan draws, models and sculpts using mixed media. War, religion and other themes from his childhood memories shape his artwork. Story narrative is another aspect of Duncan's works, which he attributes to his mother's storytelling.

Before he creates his sculptures and mixed-media productions Duncan usually sketches his ideas on paper. Many of these drawings are never realized or constructed, considering that Duncan has produced and possesses over 54 volumes of sketchbooks.

== Further reading and viewing ==
- West Art and Law, St. Paul, Minnesota: West Publishing Company, 1993.
- Art and the Law, St. Paul, Minnesota: West Publishing Company, 1991.
- Diane Allison, “Sacred Childhood: Through the Eyes of Tom Duncan,” Raw Vision (No. 60, Autumn/Fall 2007): 22–30.
- Peter Kalb, “Review, Tom Duncan: The Art of War and Peace, Andrew Edlin Gallery,” Art in America (September 2003)
- Jennifer Borum, “Review, Tom Duncan: A Retrospective - The Art of War and Peace, Andrew Edlin Gallery, New York,” Raw Vision (No. 42, October 2002): 61.
- John Maizels, “The Art of War and Peace at AVAM,” Raw Vision (No. 38, Spring 2002): 60.
- Hearne Pardee, Art News (March 1995)
- Eileen Watkins, Newark Star-Ledger (June 1995): 11.
- Jennifer P. Borum, “Reviews: Tom Duncan: G.W. Einstein,” Artforum (Summer 1992): 112.
- David Ebony, “Tom Duncan at G.W. Einstein,” Art in America (June 1992): 114.
- Michael Brenson, The New York Times (November 4, 1998)
- Helen Harrison, The New York Times (July 27, 1986)
- Tom Duncan: The Art of War and Peace (film). Commentary by Jennifer Borum and Michael Bonesteel, 2003.
