= Donald James MacKintosh =

Colonel Donald James MacKintosh CB MVO DL JP FRSE (13 January 1862 – 12 June 1947) was a Scottish physician, soldier and public health expert.

== Life ==
He was born in Shotts in 1862 the son of Donald MacKintosh, the local schoolmaster. He was educated locally at the Dykehead School. After a general degree at St Andrews University he then studied medicine at Glasgow University graduating MB ChB in 1884.

He began working in the Glasgow Eye Infirmary and then moved to the Belvidere Fever Hospital then from 1892 as medical superintendent of the Glasgow Royal Infirmary. A keen soldier, he left his wife and son (who went to live with relatives in Moffat) during the Boer War and, serving in South Africa, he rose to the rank of colonel.

In 1902 he helped to design the Glasgow Infirmary Outpatients Department with the architect John James Burnet. The building was opened in 1905. In November 1902 he was created a Member of the Victorian Order MVO by King Edward VII.

In 1904 he was elected a Fellow of the Royal Society of Edinburgh. His proposers were John Gray McKendrick, Sir James David Marwick, John Glaister and Ralph Stockman.

He lived in Western Infirmary House, a property reserved for senior physicians at the hospital.

He died in Glasgow in 1947.

== Family ==
He was married to Margaret (Maggie) Fullarton.

Their children included Donald MacKintosh who received a posthumous Victoria Cross for his self-sacrifice in the Battle of Arras (1917).
