= Henderson Theatre =

Theatre

Coordinates: 55°49′13.5″N 3°47′34.4″W

The Henderson Theatre
- Interactive map of The Henderson Theatre
- Address: Shotts Community Education Centre, Kirk Road; Shotts; Scotland
- Owner: North Lanarkshire Council
- Operator: North Lanarkshire Council
- Capacity: 147
- Public transit: Shotts train station
- Parking: Car Park

Construction
- Opened: 8 April 1982

The Henderson Theatre is a 147 seat studio theatre in Shotts in North Lanarkshire. It was built in April 1982 by converting part of the former Calderhead Junior Secondary School, which was built in 1876 and closed in 1965 when it became Shotts Community Education Centre. The theatre is named in honour of notable local actor and drama teacher James Archibald Henderson and is currently owned and managed by the local authority, North Lanarkshire Council.

== Location ==
The theatre is sited in Shotts Community Education Centre in Kirk Road, Shotts in Lanarkshire - 300 metres from Shotts train station and 3 miles from Junction 5 of the M8 motorway.

== History ==
Voluntary organisation Shotts Arts Guild was founded in 1978, with the aim of promoting arts and culture in the town and the surrounding villages. After an earlier attempt to gain financial support for the building of a theatre had failed in 1973, it set out to demonstrate demand for cultural events in the area. It did this by providing transport to cultural events in Edinburgh and Glasgow and organising a programme of events in the Shotts Community Education Centre and Calderhead High School.

In 1982, after five years fund raising by the community, with match funding from Strathclyde Regional Council, Motherwell District Council and the Scottish Arts Council, a 147 seater theatre was opened, and named after James Archibald (known as Archie) Henderson. It quickly became a receiving house for touring companies on the Scottish theatre circuit.

As well as running a regular programme of events, Shotts Arts Guild broadened access to the arts and cultivated home grown talent, arranging for the performers visiting the theatre to visit local schools. It provided music tuition from 1988, purchasing violins and other instruments for the students, and giving them the opportunity to perform in front of a live audience.

The theatre has been used less frequently for arts activity since the mid-1990s, but is still used by local churches and community groups. A voluntary organisation, Spotlight Shotts formed in Spring 2023 with the aim of refurbishing and bringing the theatre back into regular use. The first live performances for a number of years were staged in 2023 by 'In Motion Theatre Company' and Shotts based theatre company 'Theatre Presto'.

== Name and opening ==
James Archibald Henderson was born on the 9 October 1899 and died in September 1982 aged 82. He began his working life as a coal miner and started out his acting career in Shotts Amateur Dramatic Society in 1916, eventually becoming a member of the Scottish National Theatre Society and the Scottish National Players. He played all over Scotland and London, returning to Shotts to form several drama groups - the YMCA Players, Shotts Labour Party Drama Team, Shotts Miners' Welfare Players, Shotts Bertram Players and was active in Shotts Community Drama Association.

The theatre’s opening ceremony, which reflected his status as something of a local hero, was compered by one of Henderson’s famous former students and long-time friend, film and theatre actor Andrew Keir, who was also born and brought up in Shotts. Opening the theatre Councillor James Burns said “I pay tribute to all the hard work and enthusiasm which has brought this project to fruition “...”It is fitting that it is named after Archie Henderson whose total dedication to drama for more than 60 years has been of benefit not only to Shotts but to the whole of Scotland.” The ceremony was followed by a performance of Joe Corrie’s play “In time o’ strife” staged by 7:84 Theatre Company.

=== Notable Performances ===
Since it opened in 1982, the theatre has hosted professional and amateur productions of theatre, dance, music, puppetry, storytelling and film, alongside participatory workshops.

Some of the most notable performances were by renowned Scottish and UK touring theatre companies 7:84, Wildcat, Traverse Theatre Company, Communicado, Theatre Workshop, Hull Truck Theatre Company as well as Scottish Opera Go Round, Scottish Chamber Choir, the Telemann Ensemble and the Whistlebinkies.

=== Notable Performers ===
- Alan Cumming in 'It’s not the end of the World' – Theatre Workshop - April 1987
- Blythe Duff in 'Checking out' - Cumbernauld Theatre Company - March 1988
- Elaine C Smith, Dorothy Paul, Katy Murphy and Ida Schuster - 'The Steamie' 1987
- One of the earliest appearances of the group who would go on to be the Flying Pickets in 7:84’s 'One Big Blow' March -1981
- Dave Anderson - Wildcat Stage Productions including 'The Appointment' 1989 and 'Givin it Fish' 1992
- Liz Lochhead poetry readings - June 1982
- One of the earliest appearances of Shotts band Bedlam that would later become Octopus
- Andrew Keir
