= Shotts =

Village in North Lanarkshire, Scotland

Coordinates: 55.823°N 3.804°W

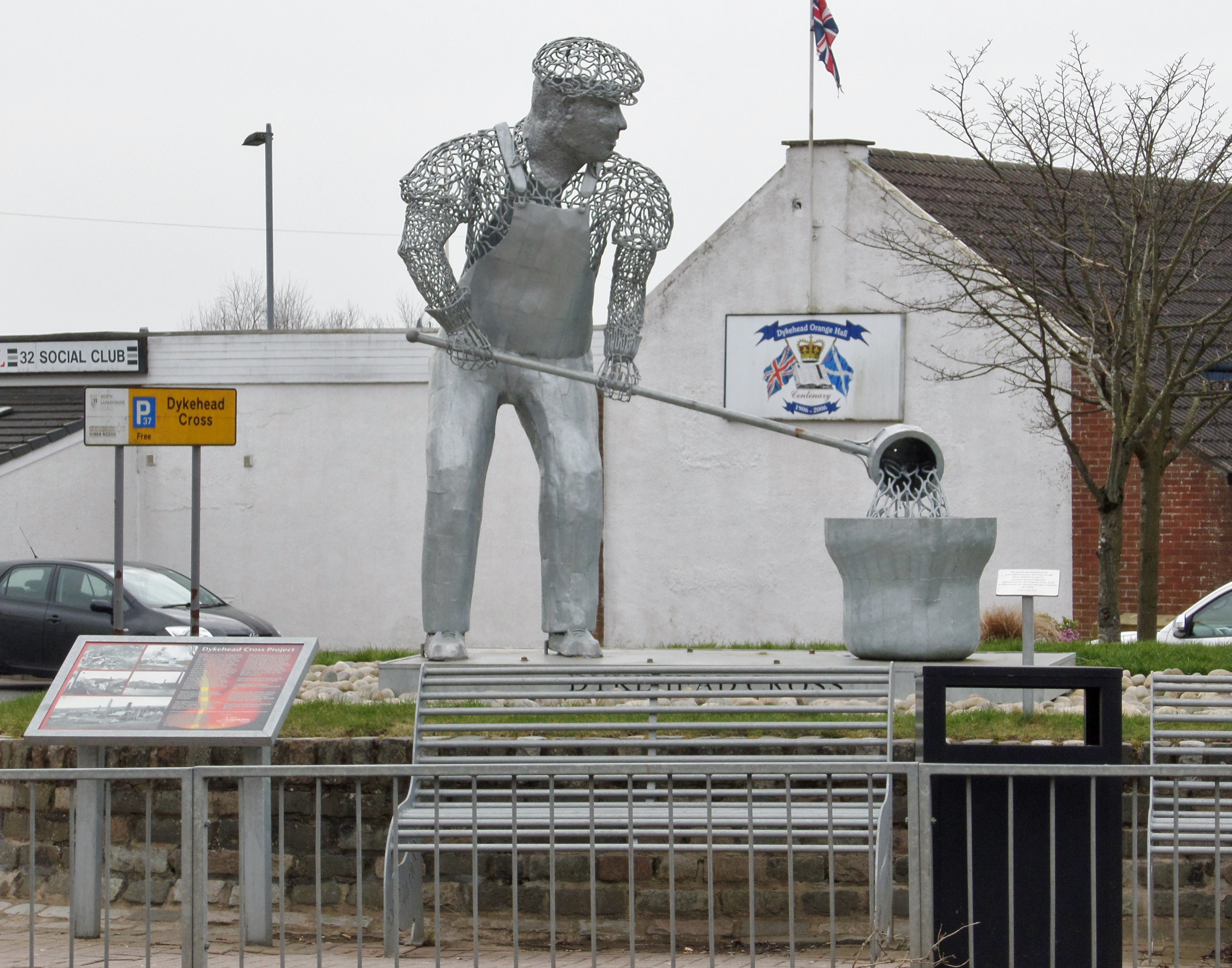
- Metalworker statue in town centre.

- Location within North Lanarkshire
- Population: 8,630 (2020)
- Council area: North Lanarkshire
- Lieutenancy area: Lanarkshire
- Country: Scotland
- Sovereign state: United Kingdom
- Post town: Shotts
- Postcode district: ML7
- Dialling code: 01501
- Police: Scotland
- Fire: Scottish
- Ambulance: Scottish
- UK Parliament: Airdrie and Shotts
- Scottish Parliament: Airdrie and Shotts

Shotts is a town in North Lanarkshire, Scotland. It is located 16 miles (25 kilometres) from Glasgow and has a population of about 8,840. A local story has Shotts being named after the legendary giant highwayman Bertram de Shotts, though toponymists give the Anglo-Saxon scēots ("steep slopes") as the real source of the name. Shotts is the home of the world famous Shotts and Dykehead Caledonia Pipe Band, 16-time winners of World Pipe Band Championships.

== Industrial history ==
Until 1457 Shotts was part of the Lanarkshire parish of Bothwell under the designation of "Bothwell-muir". Groome related that the pre-reformation church of Bertramshotts is mentioned in a papal bull in 1476. The parish, one of the largest in Lowland Scotland at 10 miles (16 kilometres) long and 8 miles (13 kilometres) wide, was sometimes called Shotts but officially it was known as Bertram Shotts.

In 1830s the principal owners of the land were the Duke of Hamilton, Sir Thomas Inglis Cochrane of Murdoston MP, the Right Honourable Dowager Lady Torphichen, and Robert Carrick Buchanan Esquire of Drumpellier.

Shotts was known for its mining and ironworks. The Shotts Iron Company was first established in 1801 and provided employment for Shotts and the surrounding area for 150 years, and was eventually wound up in 1952. These were developed when transport by canal and railway became possible. By the late 1800s the ironworks had grown to the extent that the village slogan was "Shotts lights the world", as gas lamp standards made here were exported throughout the British Empire and beyond. In the years leading up to World War II there were 22 coal mines in the area, but Northfield Colliery, the last of these, closed in the 1960s.

In 1956 Cummins Engine Company Ltd opened a factory in Shotts, occupying a former textile mill. It was referred to as the Wren's Nest and was their first manufacturing facility outside of the United States, specialising in high-speed diesel engines and a new type of engine used in railway passenger trains. The factory was expanded again in 1980 in a rationalist/ functionalist design by Ahrends, Burton & Koralek so distinctive that it was Category A listed. In its Statement of Special Interest Historic Environment Scotland state that is it is "considered to be one of most significant and important examples of large industrial buildings in later 20th century Britain". The factory closed in 1996 with the loss of 700 jobs.

Between 1964 and 1980 Timpo Toys employed around a thousand people at its factory in Torbothie Road in the production of plastic toys and figurines such as cowboys, indians and soldiers. In the late 70s turnover began to decline and by December 1980 the Factory had closed.

Shotts has also been home to a number of large food producters:

Started in 1897, when Pietro Campopiano moved from Montecasino near Rome to Shotts and opened a cafe, Camp Brothers became of the largest independent ice-cream makers in Scotland. Five generations of the family had run the firm until 2003 when it went into receivership.

In the 1930s the Bell family established a bakery in Shotts and Wishaw along with catering vans. In the 1950s they began developing a wholesale business producing pre-prepared puff pastry, and over the next few decades they became well known for their range of pies, bridies, sausage rolls. The company also acquired Kirriemuir Gingerbread Ltd. By the 1990s the business had outgrown its Dykehead premises and built a second larger baking facility and headquarters on Torbothie Road, the Hawthorn Bakery, which remains open to this day. Bells products can still be found in most supermarkets and they are reported to make 16 million pies a year.

Run by the Davidson brothers Davidsons Animal Feeds also occupy a site on Gray Street behind the former iron works and have been operating since the 1980s making food for cows and sheep. It now claims to be the largest manufacture of feed in Scotland.

== Geography ==
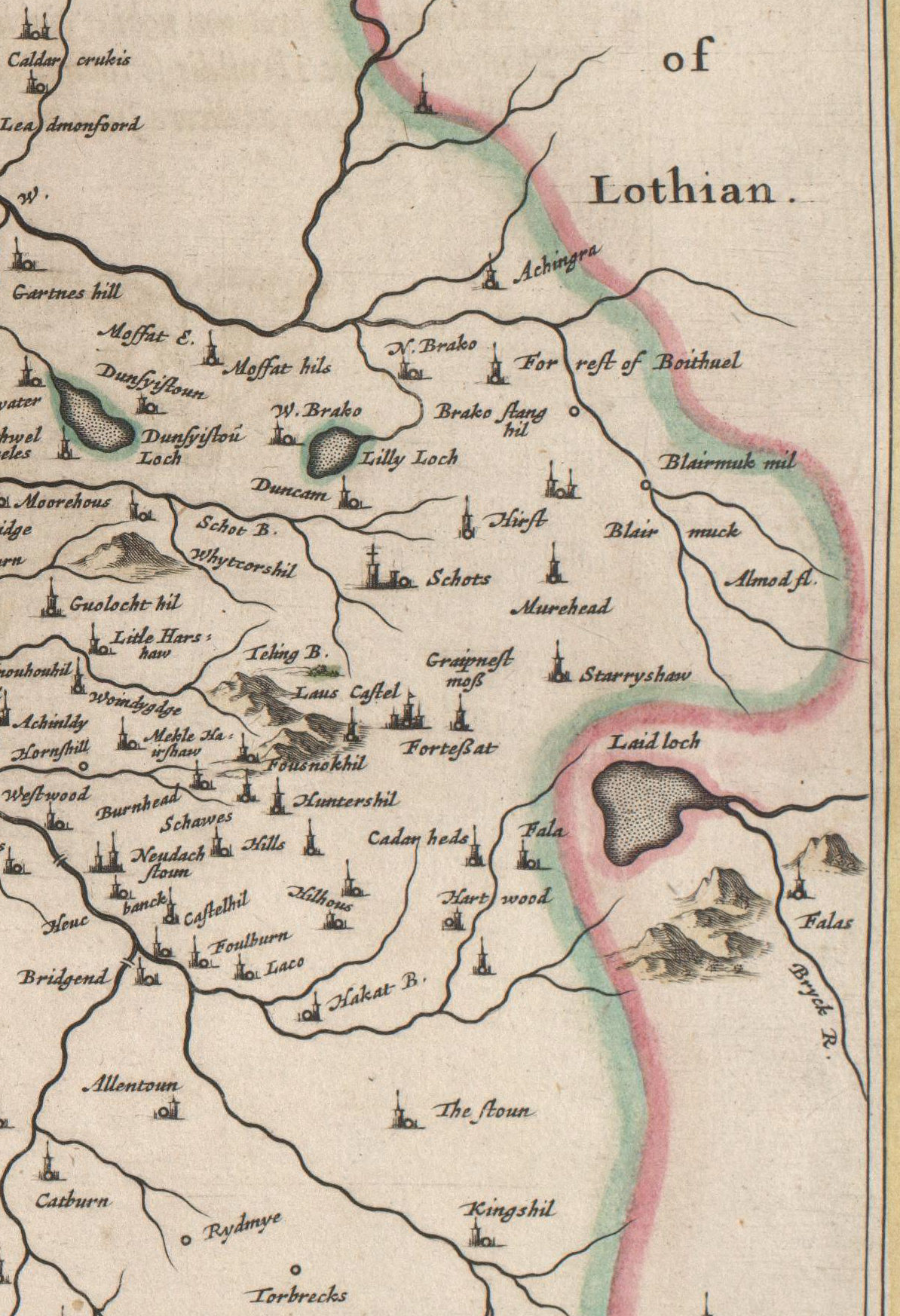
Blaeu's map based on Pont's original "Glasgow and the county of Lanark" map c. 1596 depicting Schots (Shotts), Falas (Fauldhouse), Torbrecks (Tarbrax), Allentoun (Allanton) etc.

Shotts is south of the M8 in North Lanarkshire between Wishaw and Harthill. Historically the Shotts Iron Works were between Calderhead, source of the South Calder Water, and Stane. Shotts parish was originally made up of five villages: Dykehead, Calderside, Stane, Springhill and Torbothie; all growing up around the old coach roads between Glasgow and Edinburgh that expanded and merged during the 18th and 19th centuries following the growth in mining.

Nearby is Kirk o' Shotts transmitting station.

== Churches ==
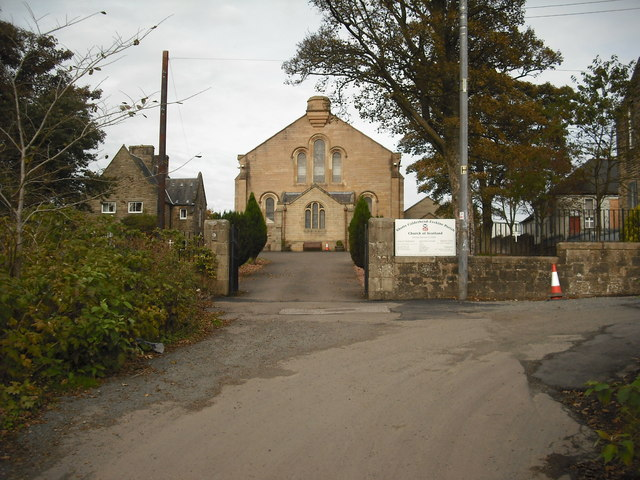
Shotts Calderhead- Erskine Parish Church

The town has a number of churches.

- Calderhead-Erskine Parish Church, a Church of Scotland congregation.
- St Patricks Catholic Church
- Shotts EU Congregational Church
- Shotts Salvation Army
- Dykehead Mission Hall
- Kingdom Hall Of Jehovah's Witnesses

A couple of miles north of Shotts is the Kirk O'Shotts Parish Church (although this covers the community of Salsburgh and other nearby communities).

== Sport ==
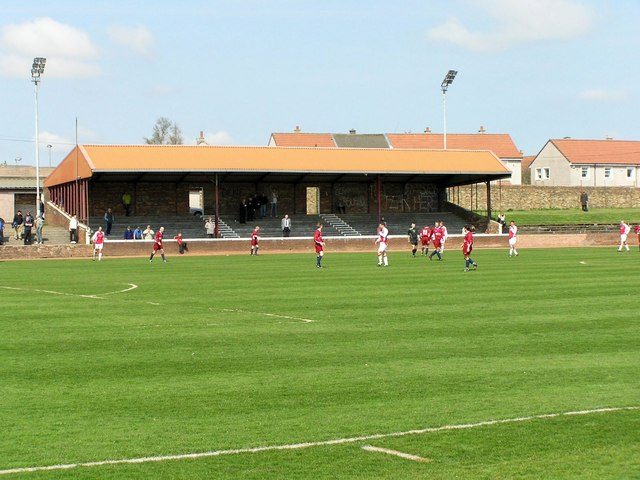
Hannah Park

Shotts has a number of sports facilitated in the local community. Shotts Golf Club, an 18-hole course founded in 1895, is to the North-East of the town. Between 1950 and 2022, Shotts hosted its own Highland Games in Hannah Park.

=== Football teams ===
- Shotts Bon Accord
- Dykehead F.C.

=== Notable footballers from Shotts ===
- Michelle Barr, Scotland women's international footballer.
- Hugh Dallas (referee)
- Jim McCluskey (referee)
- John McSeveney
- William McSeveney, footballer and Captain of Motherwell Football Club - Ancell Babes
- John Walker
- William Watson
- Willie Orr
- Alex King
- Sam Booth
- James McKee
- Philip Watson
- Cameron Duncan
- Willie Hannah
- Archibald Hastie
- Hugh May
- John May
- John Waugh
- Jocky Whiteford
- Willie Telfer
- Patrick Slavin
- Davie Russell
- Charlie Rennox
- John Prentice
- Jack Kennedy
- Hugh Goldie
- John Mulhall
- Ricki Lamie

== HMP Shotts ==
HMP Shotts, a high security prison holding male prisoners with maximum security classification, is located between Shotts and Salsburgh. It opened in 1978 and provided a new source of employment after the closure of the mines.

== Transport ==
The town is served by Shotts railway station, which is connected on the Shotts Line between Glasgow and Edinburgh.

== Schools within Shotts ==
- St.Patrick's Primary
- Stane Primary
- Dykehead Primary
- Calderhead High School

== Theatre ==
The Henderson Theatre is a 147-seater black box theatre built in 1982 within the Shotts Community Education Centre. It is named after Archibald James Henderson, a coal miner who later became a member of the Scottish National Theatre Society and the Scottish National Players and formed several local drama groups: the YMCA Players, Shotts Labour Party Drama Team, Shotts Miners' Welfare Players, and Shotts Bertram Players. He was also active in Shotts Community Drama Association.

== Music ==
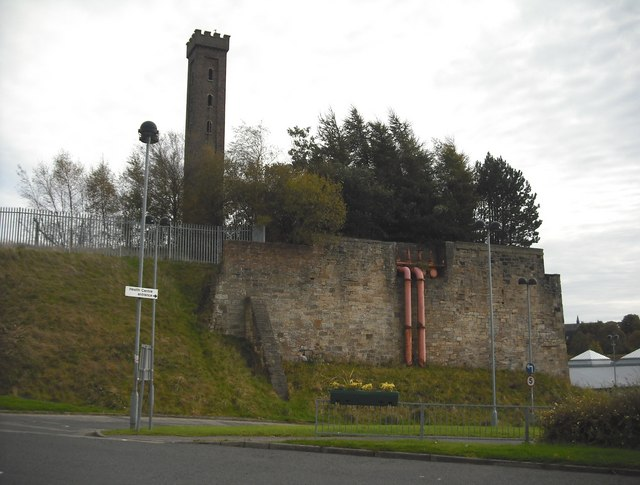
Shotts Iron Works

Notable bands

- Octopus (Scottish band)
- Shotts and Dykehead Caledonia Pipe Band

== Notable people ==
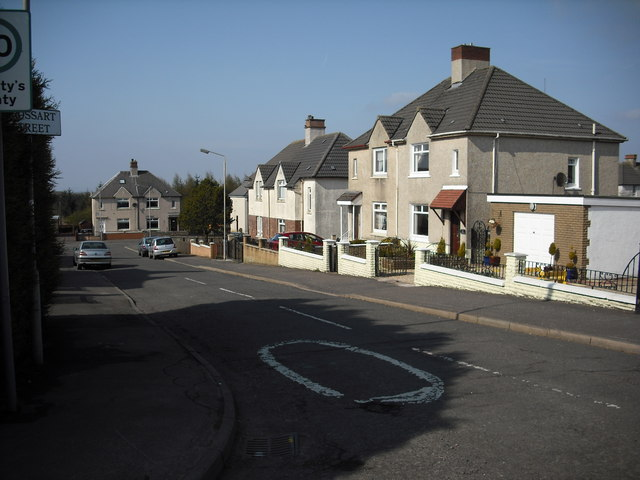
Grossart Street Salsburgh named after the surgeon and historian William Grossart

- Mick McGahey, Scottish miners' leader
- Matthew Baillie, Anatomist
- Gavin Hamilton, Neoclassical history painter
- John Millar, Philosopher
- Margaret Herbison, Minister of Pensions and National Insurance from 1964 to 1967
- Andrew Keir, Actor
- George MacBeth Writer
- Col Donald James MacKintosh FRSE, Soldier and Physician
- Catriona Shearer, Newsreader, Journalist and Television Presenter.
- Jim Rodger OBE, also known as 'Scoop' or 'the Jolly', famous for being a football journalist
- Janet Hamilton a nineteenth-century Scottish Poet.
- James Meek, Moderator of the General Assembly of the Church of Scotland in 1795 (1774–1810)
- Allan Lindsay, Triple jumper at the 1948 Olympics
- Karen Whitefield, Member of the Scottish Parliament between 1999 and 2011
- William Chambers, Milliner
- Bertram de Shotts Highwayman
- Hugh Duffy Scottish rugby union and professional rugby league footballer
- James Marley Member of Parliament
- Tom Duncan Artist
- William Clevland Royal Navy Commander
- Thomas Torrance Missionary
- Sir Ian George Wilson Hill Physician
- Colonel Donald James MacKintosh
- David Young discus thrower
- Robert Martin Watt architect
