= History of Watford F.C. =

History of an English football club

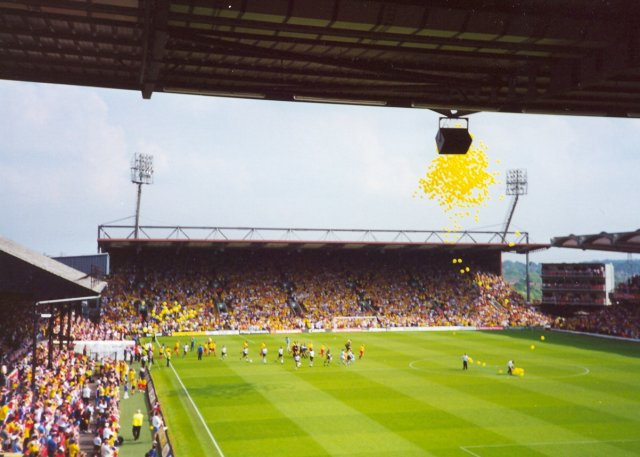
The Rookery and Main stands at Vicarage Road, at the end of the 1999–2000 season

Watford Football Club is an English association football club from Watford, Hertfordshire. Formed as Watford Rovers in 1881, the club entered the FA Cup for the first time in 1886. In the same year, they also entered the county-wide Herts Senior Cup, reaching the final six times over the next ten years. Watford Rovers became West Hertfordshire in 1893, and joined the Southern League for the 1896–97 season. The team started to change from one entirely of amateurs, to one including paid professionals. In 1898, West Hertfordshire merged with Watford St Mary's to form Watford Football Club.

== Early years ==
The club participated in the Southern League from 1896 until 1920, experiencing considerable success. They won six league titles in this period, including the Southern League First Division in 1914–15. After the resumption of Southern League football following a four-year hiatus due to the First World War, Watford missed out on a second consecutive title in 1919–20 on goal average. They joined the Football League Third Division in the 1920–21 season, and following its subsequent reorganisation became founder members of the Third Division South in 1921.

== Modern Era ==
Watford remained in the Third Division South for the next 37 years, and experienced scarce success. Fred Pagnam finished as the Division's top scorer in 1922–23, the club reached the final of the Third Division South Cup in 1935 and 1937 (winning on the latter occasion), and Len Dunderdale scored 21 goals for Watford in 1938–39 despite leaving midway through the season. The team started to progress after the reorganisation of the Football League into four national divisions in 1958. They won promotion to the Third Division in 1960, the Second Division in 1969, and reached the FA Cup semi-final in 1970. However, the league progress was reversed with two relegations over the next five years, and in 1976–77 Watford were briefly bottom of the entire Football League.

A turning point in the club's history came in the late 1970s. Singer, shareholder and lifelong Watford supporter Elton John became chairman in 1976, and appointed Graham Taylor as manager in 1977. The club achieved consecutive promotions between 1977 and 1979, and reached the First Division for the first time in their history in 1982. Furthermore, in 1982–83 Watford finished second in the First Division, and Luther Blissett was the division's top scorer with 27 goals. Consequently, Watford qualified for the UEFA Cup in 1983–84. They also reached their first FA Cup final, losing 2–0 to Everton at Wembley Stadium. Following Taylor's departure in 1987, Watford were relegated in 1988.

Watford remained in English football's second tier for eight seasons, until they were relegated in 1995–96. Taylor returned as manager in 1997, and for the second time in his career led Watford to consecutive promotions, although he was unable to prevent relegation from the Premier League in 1999–2000. In the 21st century Watford have reached two FA Cup semi-finals, one League Cup semi-final, and spent a further season in the Premier League after winning the 2006 Football League Championship play-off final under the management of Aidy Boothroyd.

== The birth of Watford Football Club ==
The club was formed as Watford Rovers in 1881, when George Devereux de Vere Capell, Earl of Essex and owner of Cassiobury Park, gave a group of boys permission to use the grounds for football. However, the agreement stipulated that the team could not play organised competitive matches on the estate. Members of the group included Henry Grover, the man later recognised as the club's founder, and Charlie Peacock, who played for Hertfordshire, became involved with board meetings at the club, and became the proprietor of the Watford Observer, the local newspaper. Over the next five years the team participated exclusively in friendly matches against schools and local clubs. Matches played when the club was not entering competitions included the first recorded fixture against future rivals Luton Town; a 1–0 home win to Watford on 5 December 1885. In the 1886–87 season, Watford Rovers entered the FA Cup for the first time, although they were eliminated in their opening game. They have competed in at least one competition in every season since. From 1886 team participated in the Herts Senior Cup, a competition open to all clubs in Hertfordshire, winning it on four occasions. They also participated in the Hennessey Cup—open to clubs within a 10-mile (16 km) radius of Uxbridge—between 1888 and 1891. Rovers' first match against Watford St Mary's was a 7–4 home win on 17 January 1891. The teams met on eleven further occasions prior to their merge in 1898. In total, Rovers and their successors West Hertfordshire won six times, St Mary's four times, and the remaining two matches ended in draws.

== Southern League ==
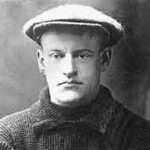
Goalkeeper Skilly Williams played in every league game during Watford's 1914–15 season.

West Hertfordshire joined the Southern Football League in 1896, and started to turn professional the following year. In 1898, they merged with Watford St Mary's to become Watford Football Club. That same year, the club moved on to a ground in Cassio Road. Pressure from the owner eventually forced the manager, Harry Kent, to look for a new permanent ground which he found in 1914 at Vicarage Road, the club's home today. However, they remained at Cassio Road for a further eight years. Watford won the Southern League title in 1914–15, and missed out on retaining their title in 1919–20 on goal average. Along with the rest of the division, Watford left the Southern League in 1920, becoming founder members of the Football League Third Division. In the early years the club was sponsored by Ralph Thorpe, chairman of Wells Brewery and Benskins brewery sponsored the purchase of Vicarage Road earning the team the nickname of "The Brewers". Another early nickname was "the Wasps" because of their shirts which bore coloured hoops.

== The Third Division South years ==
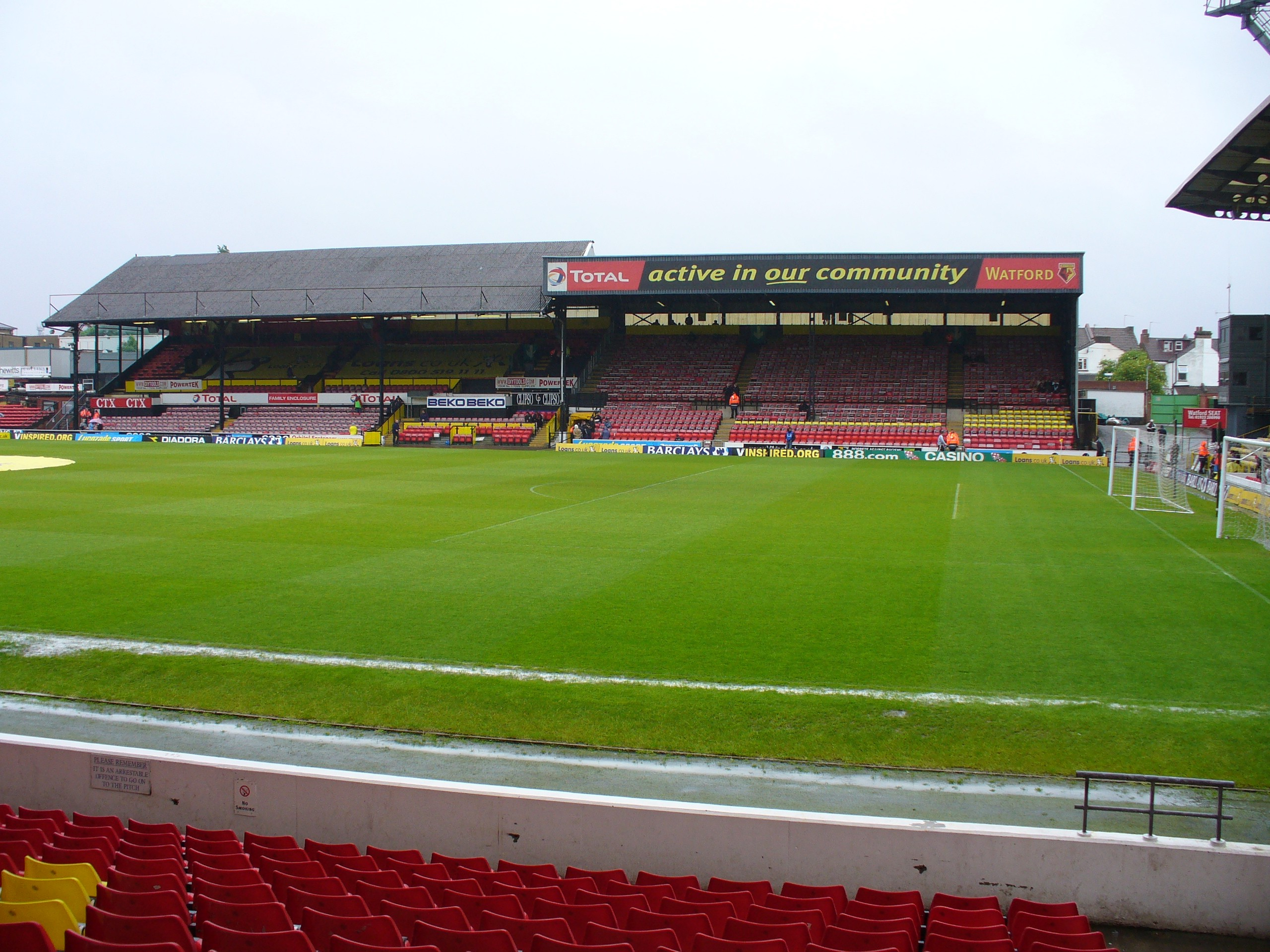
The East Stand formed part of the original stadium when it opened in 1922, but it closed in 2008. The structure stood until 2013 when it was demolished to make way for the new East Stand (called the 'Watford F.C. Community Stand).

From 1921–22, the third tier of the Football League consisted of two parallel sections of 22 clubs, fighting both for promotion to the Second Division and also battling to hold on to their hard-won league status. There was a re-election system in place which meant the bottom two teams in each of the two divisions had to apply for re-election in favour of the champions of the Northern League and Southern League. Watford moved into Vicarage Road stadium in 1922. They remained in the Third Division South for a further 36 years, and when the league was restructured into four national divisions for the 1958–59, Watford were placed in the new Fourth Division.

Up until 1960 the team was known as "The Blues".

After a change of colours to gold shirts & black shorts, the team's nickname was changed to The Hornets, after a popular vote via the supporters club.

== Progression from and return to the bottom division ==
Watford spent two seasons in the Fourth Division before they gained promotion to the Third Division in 1959–60. Ron Burgess, the former Tottenham Hotspur player was manager during the promotion season, which was largely attributed to Cliff Holton's 48 goals. Holton was sold to Northampton Town the following year after another 34 goals, which caused enormous unrest among supporters. Burgess sold other players to keep the club afloat, such as Dave Underwood to Fulham.

Bill McGarry was Ron Burgess' successor, and brought in new players such as Charlie Livesey (25 goals in one season), Ron Saunders (later to manage several top division sides) and Jimmy McAnearney. An Irish schoolboy named Pat Jennings was signed from Newry Town. After making a large impact in the first team, he was transferred after less than one season to Spurs, again to keep the club afloat.

McGarry was succeeded after moving to Ipswich Town by Ken Furphy from Workington Town, in 1964, as player manager. Furphy rebuilt the team originally around the young talent of Dennis Bond in midfield and Keith Eddy in midfield and defence. The team held Liverpool to a draw in the FA Cup, and narrowly missed out on promotion in 1966–67, finishing third. However, Bond was soon sold. Furphy's re-building came to fruition in 1969 with the signing from non-league Pelton Fell F.C. of Barry Endean, who kicked off an unbeaten run after Christmas to help Watford secure the league title in the April home match against Plymouth Argyle.

A year later they reached the FA Cup semi-final for the first time, beating First Division teams Stoke City and Liverpool, which prompted hopes that the club could soon be playing First Division football. But they struggled to compete in the higher division, and Ken Furphy was poached by Blackburn Rovers, to be succeeded by George Kirby. Hampered by a lack of funds and the need to sell players to survive (Scullion, Garbett and Franks all joined Sheffield United), Watford fell back into the Third Division in 1972.

Watford failed to make an impact in the Third Division, and in 1975 were relegated to the Fourth Division. However, they were adopted by their most famous fan, superstar singer Elton John, in 1973 first as president and from 1976 as chairman. He had a declared ambition to take Watford into the First Division.

== The first Graham Taylor era ==
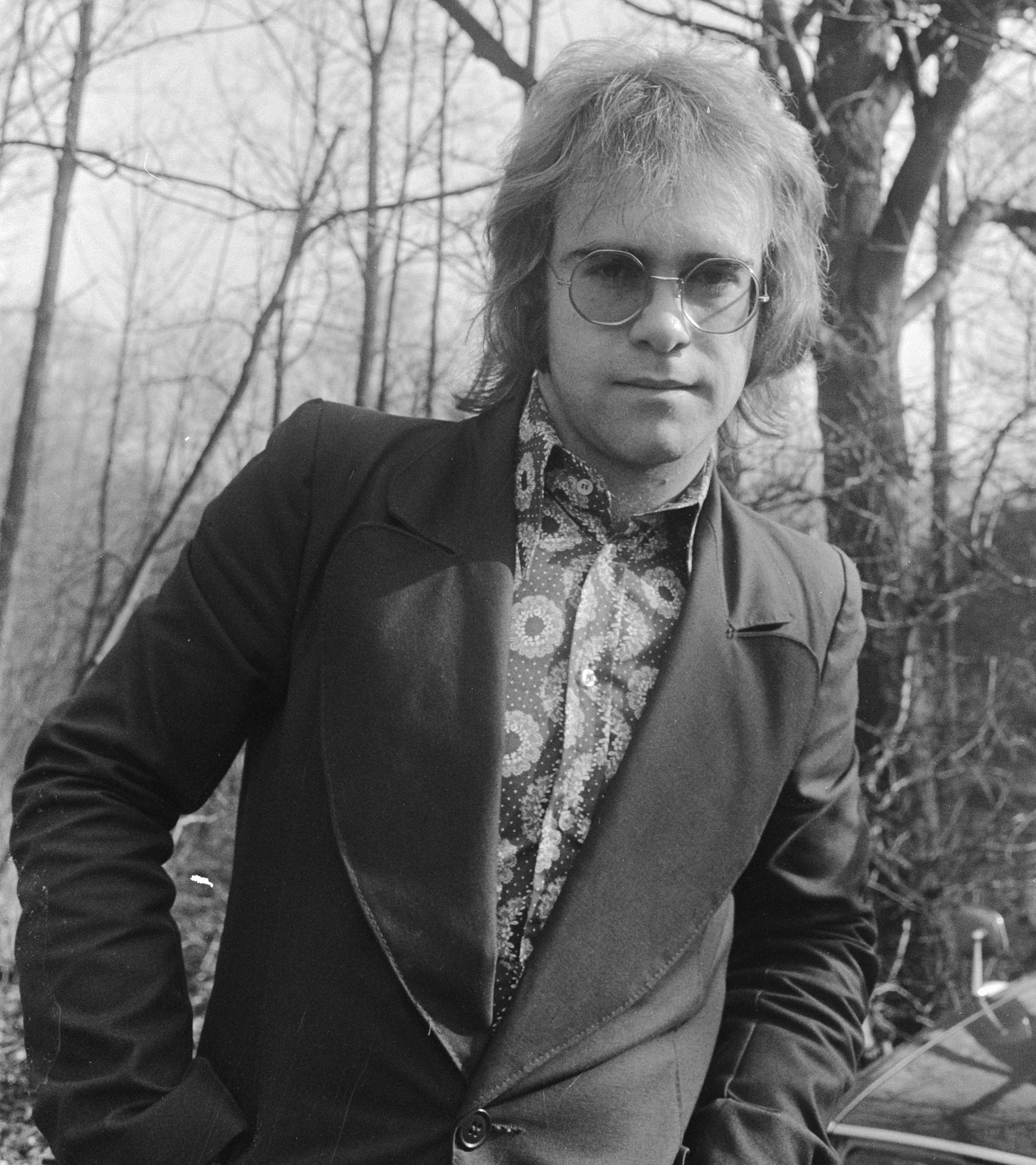
Elton John has been associated with the club since the 1970s.

When 32-year-old Graham Taylor was named as Watford's new manager at the start of the 1977–78 season, the club had just been purchased by world-famous star Elton John (a lifelong fan of the club) and were an unremarkable Fourth Division side. In 1977 the greyhound track that encircled the pitch was removed as it was seen to lower the club's professional reputation by the manager Graham Taylor. Thanks to the efforts of chairman, manager and playing staff, Watford began to progress through the leagues.

The first promotion was achieved in 1978, when The Hornets sealed the Fourth Division title by an 11-point margin over their nearest rivals Southend United. Also going up that year were Swansea City, who would enjoy a similar rise through the league (though unlike Watford a similarly quick fall). The 11-point margin that Watford achieved that season was particularly impressive considering that the Football League still only awarded 2 points for a win at the time. A second successive promotion followed, as Watford finished runners-up in the Third Division behind Shrewsbury Town, with Swansea also being promoted again by finishing third.

The first season back in the Second Division was tough, as Watford narrowly avoided relegation by finishing 18th. They progressed to a new high of ninth place in 1981, before reaching the First Division for the first time in 1982 as Second Division runners-up. Players in this side included Wilf Rostron, Roger Joslyn, Les Taylor and the club's first ever overseas player Jan Lohman. Players like John Barnes, Ross Jenkins and Luther Blissett were some of the most respected players in the English game during the 1980s.

Any doubts that Graham Taylor's team were good enough to stay in the First Division were soon confounded as they achieved comfortable wins over big clubs Everton, West Bromwich Albion and Southampton during the opening weeks of the season, finishing September with an 8–0 demolition of Sunderland. The September win over Albion briefly saw them top the league, and although they soon lost their grip on top spot they were still putting considerable pressure on leaders Liverpool as 1983 dawned. They ended their first top division campaign in fine form, sealing runners-up spot behind Liverpool (champions by an 11-point margin) and defeating the champions 2–1 at Vicarage Road on the final day of the season.

There was no title challenge in 1983–84, and the UEFA Cup adventure - the first time the club had experienced European football - lasted to the third round where they were defeated by Sparta Prague of Czechoslovakia after eliminating Kaiserslautern of West Germany and Levski Sofia of Bulgaria. Indeed, much of Watford's season was spent battling relegation before good form in the second half of the season saw them achieved a secure 11th-place finish, thanks largely to the arrival of 20-year-old Scottish striker Mo Johnston who scored 20 goals in 29 league games after his arrival in November. That season, Watford made the headlines once again by reaching the FA Cup final for the very first time in their history. They were paired with an Everton side in what was dubbed 'the friendly final' who won the trophy with a 2–0 scoreline.

Watford performed erratically during 1984–85, achieving impressive victories over big clubs including Manchester United, Nottingham Forest and Tottenham Hotspur as well as holding Liverpool to a 1–1 draw on New Year's Day, but they also suffered some defeats in crucial games which restricted them to an 11th-place finish. They reached the last 16 in both of the domestic cups.

1985–86 began with a heavy 4–0 defeat to Tottenham Hotspur at White Hart Lane, but was followed with comprehensive wins over Birmingham City and West Bromwich Albion, the teams who occupied the bottom two places in the league at the season's end and finished well short of survival. The generally good form continued throughout the autumn and although it was soon clear that Watford were not going to be a threat in the title race (being dominated by Manchester United until they slipped up and the title was eventually won by Liverpool) they were never in any real danger of relegation. A top five finish seemed a realistic target for some time, although there would be less incentive for this target to be achieved due to English clubs being banned from European competitions as a result of the Heysel disaster on 29 May 1985, in which rioting by Liverpool fans in the European Cup final in Brussels resulted in the deaths of 39 spectators. Watford's best chance of success that season came in the FA Cup, where they progressed to the quarter-finals and were paired with Liverpool, holding them to a goalless draw at Anfield on 11 March 1986. There were high hopes that Watford could triumph in the replay at Vicarage Road six days later, but the Merseysiders won the replay 2–1 in extra time and went on to win the double. Watford eventually finished 12th in the final table and ended the season on a high note by demolishing sixth placed Chelsea 5–1 at Stamford Bridge.

1986–87 was Graham Taylor's final season as manager of Watford before he accepted an offer to take charge of Aston Villa. They fared slightly better in the league than they had in the previous three campaigns, finishing ninth, but enjoyed their best cup run since 1984 by reaching the FA Cup semi-finals where they were eliminated by Tottenham Hotspur in a 4–1 rout at Villa Park. They exacted some revenge on the North Londoners on the final day of the season by defeating them 1–0 at Vicarage Road.

Taylor's successor as manager was Dave Bassett, whose Wimbledon club had achieved an even quicker rise to the First Division from the Fourth than the one enjoyed by Watford (three promotions in four seasons) and had just ended their first top flight season in style with a sixth-place finish. However, his task to carry on the good work at Watford was complicated by the fact that established England international John Barnes left the club before the start of the 1987–88 season. The 23-year-old winger moved to Liverpool for £900,000 (then a record Watford sale) on 19 June 1987.

== Return to the lower leagues ==
After Graham Taylor left, Dave Bassett was placed in charge. The Hornets suffered a terrible start to the 1987–88 season, and Dave Bassett was let go after a short stint of only eight months. Watford were relegated from the First Division at the end of that season. The next season, 1988–89, Watford failed to return to the First Division after they lost Second Division playoffs. Over the next few seasons, Watford never seriously challenged for promotion. Their highest finish was a Craig Ramage-inspired seventh in Division One at the end of the 1994–95 season, but they were relegated the following year.

The club did win the FA Youth Cup in the 1988–89 season, beating Man City 2–1 after extra time; David James was in goal for the Hornets.

== The second Graham Taylor era ==
Graham Taylor returned to Watford as Director of Football in February 1996, with former player Kenny Jackett as head coach, but was unable to stop the club from sliding into Division Two.

After a mid-table finish in Division Two at the end of 1996–97, Jackett was demoted to the position of assistant manager and Taylor returned his old role as manager. The transition proved a success; Watford secured the Division Two championship in 1997–98, beating Bristol City into second place after a season-long struggle. A second successive promotion followed in 1998–99, thanks to a playoff final victory over Bolton which secured the club's promotion to the Premiership.

The Premiership season started brightly with an early surprising victory over Liverpool, but soon faded away, and Watford were relegated after finishing bottom. Graham Taylor retired at the end of the 2000–01 season (although just months later he returned to football management at Aston Villa), and was replaced in a surprise move by Gianluca Vialli, who had recently been sacked by Chelsea F.C.

== Watford in the 21st century ==
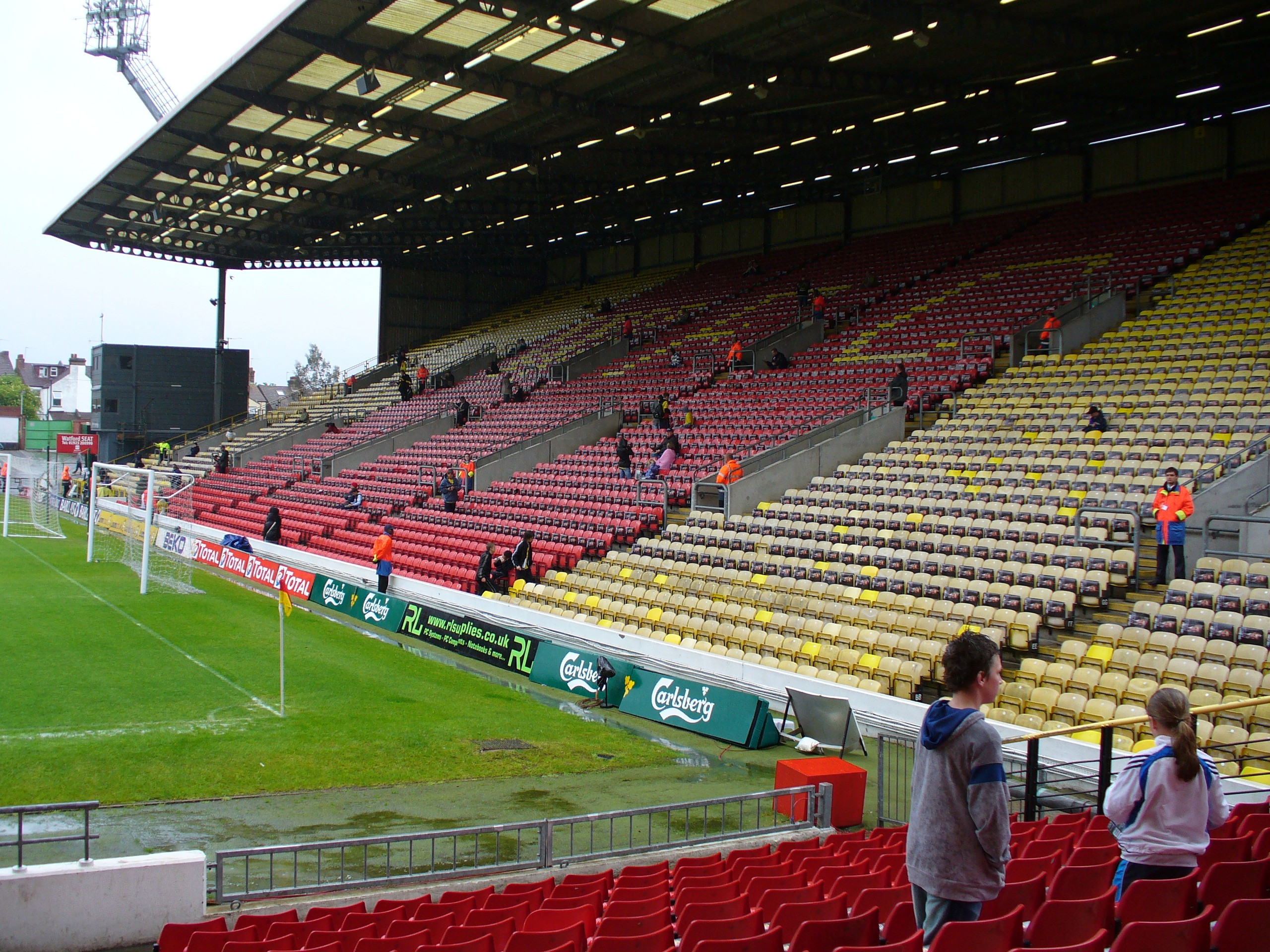
Rookery Stand, 2007

Taylor was replaced by Gianluca Vialli. Vialli made several high-profile signings, and wage bills at the club soared, with Vialli himself earning almost a million pounds a year. However, the season was disappointing, with the club finishing 14th in the division, and Vialli was sacked after only one season, having refused to resign. He was replaced by Ray Lewington, who had come to the club the previous summer as Vialli's reserve team manager.

Lewington took charge of Watford for the 2002–03 season. Over the summer many of the Vialli's signings left the club. Lewington had few funds to strengthen the side. The extent of Watford's financial difficulties was exposed in the autumn, along with many League clubs, following the collapse of ITV Digital. The club was facing administration when the players and staff agreed a 12% wage deferral. Exacerbating the club's difficulties were the large payoffs they had had to make to Vialli and several players on terminating their contracts, and Vialli's decision to sue the club early in 2003. The club started the season well, however, despite the players having to agree to a pay-cut during October, and finished in mid-table. An unexpected run to the FA Cup semi-final, where Watford lost to Premiership Southampton, also generated vital cash.

The ongoing financial difficulties saw a large number of players released that summer, including record signing Allan Nielsen and strikers Tommy Smith and Gifton Noel-Williams. To make matters worse, Manchester United loanee Davis was killed in a car-crash on the opening day of the new campaign. This had a huge effect on the team's form at the beginning of the season, and notably on his close friend Danny Webber. But a strong finish to the season saw the club finish in mid-table. The 2004–05 season saw a continuation of the good form of the end of the previous season, with the club well in the upper half of the Championship at the end of September. However, a long run of poor form subsequently saw the club drop steadily towards the relegation zone. Another good cup run further eased the club's financial position, with the team reaching the semi-final of the League Cup, soundly beating Premiership sides Portsmouth and Southampton on the way, before losing narrowly to Liverpool. The club's poor league form, however, came to a head in March, with a run of terrible performances and Lewington was sacked on the 22nd. His sacking was controversial, and many fans were unhappy at the loss of a man who had led the club to two cup semi finals in three seasons, enduring considerable financial hardships.

At the age of 34, Aidy Boothroyd was appointed manager of Watford after serving at Leeds United as a coach; 70-year-old Keith Burkinshaw was recruited as his assistant. Boothroyd's inexperience raised concerns among fans, who worried that he would not be able to keep the side in the Championship. However, Watford secured enough points to ensure survival with two games to go in the season.

For the next season Boothroyd signed strikers Darius Henderson and Marlon King (initially on a season-long loan), central defenders Clarke Carlisle and Malky Mackay, midfielder Matthew Spring and goalkeeper Ben Foster (also on a season-long loan). Carlisle, King and Spring had both worked with Boothroyd at Leeds United the previous season. Boothroyd's first full season produced one of the stories of the footballing season. Against all odds Watford generally sustained 3rd position all year with Marlon King top scoring in the division and players such as Ashley Young and Ben Foster flourishing. Indeed, a draw at home against Luton Town on 9 April secured Watford a play-off spot.

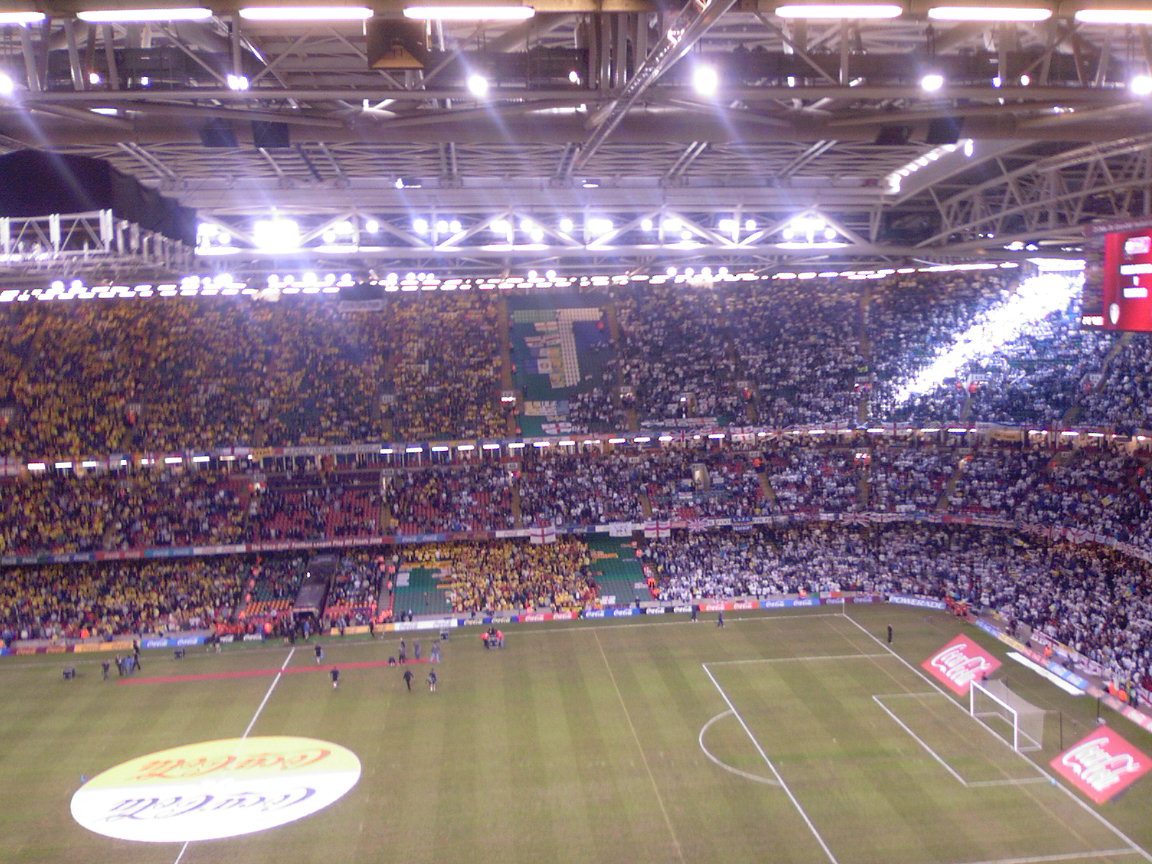
Championship Play-off final 2006. (Leeds United vs. Watford) which gained Watford promotion to the Premier League.

Following a 3–0 away victory at Crystal Palace and a subsequent 0–0 draw at Vicarage Road in the semi-finals Watford reached the playoff final at the Millennium Stadium in Cardiff. Watford then beat Leeds 3–0 in the final to gain promotion to the Premier League and an estimated £41m as a result (all 13,000 available season tickets were quickly sold out).

Watford had to wait until 4 November 2006 to record their first league win of the 2006–07 season, against Middlesbrough. This was despite continuing good performances by Ashley Young, who was sold to Aston Villa in January for a fee rising to £9.65 million, a record transfer fee for the club. Despite making eight new signings, Watford only recorded five wins in the Premiership, and sat at the bottom of the league table. However, they reached the semi-finals of the FA Cup, where they lost to Manchester United. Nonetheless Boothroyd's contract was renewed until 2010.

Boothroyd announced his intention to make an immediate return to the top division, making signings such as Jobi McAnuff from Crystal Palace for £1.75 million, and Nathan Ellington from West Brom for a Watford record fee of £3.25 million, which may rise to £4.25 million. With Darius Henderson and Marlon King scoring regularly, the team built a lead at the top of the Championship. During this good run of form, Adam Johnson was subsequently brought back to Middlesbrough and in November and December they had a poor run of form, particularly at home, which led to their closest competitor, West Brom, overtaking them in early January. Watford assured themselves a play-off place on the final day of the season after a draw at Blackpool. In the play-offs, Watford's wretched form continued with Hull City winning 2–0 at Vicarage Road and despite Watford taking the lead at the KC Stadium, Hull ran out 4–1 winners (6–1 on aggregate) to condemn Watford to another season in the Championship.

After a disappointing start to the 2008–09 season, Boothroyd left the club "by mutual consent" on 3 November 2008, with Watford languishing 21st in the Championship table. Reserve team manager and former Watford player Malky Mackay took temporary charge of the managerial affairs at Watford following Boothroyd's departure. On 5 November 2008 Sir Elton John ended his formal involvement with the club by resigning as honorary life President in protest.

Thirty-five-year-old former Chelsea Reserve Team Manager Brendan Rodgers was confirmed as Watford manager on 24 November 2008. Frank Lampard Snr moved with Rodgers to the football coaching team as Football Consultant. Within a week of Rodgers' appointment, Chairman Graham Simpson resigned from his position at the club's holding company. On 10 December Watford recorded their first win under Rodgers against Norwich City, and eventually secured their position in the league with one game to go, finishing a creditable 13th. During this time Elton John resumed his position as Life President. Rodgers left Watford in June 2009 to manage Reading, and was joined by Lampard.

Mackay was appointed permanent Watford manager on 15 June 2009. He was instrumental in revitalising Watford despite having to sell many star players and having limited funds to buy replacements. Accordingly, the team was supplemented by young loanees such as Tom Cleverley from Manchester United and Henri Lansbury from Arsenal. Watford finished 2009–10 16th in the Championship.
