= List of Watford F.C. records and statistics =

Watford Football Club is an English association football club from Watford, Hertfordshire. The club was formed in 1898 from the amalgamation of West Herts and Watford St. Mary's. As of the 2022–23 season, it competes in the EFL Championship, the second division of English football.

== Honours and achievements ==
Between 1896 and 1920, West Herts (and later Watford) competed in the Southern League, along with many future Football League sides from Southern England and Wales. The team won the league title in 1914–15, and finished as runners-up to Portsmouth on goal average in 1919–20. Watford joined the Football League in 1920, and since then have won the Third Division twice, (Note: Watford's second title at the third level of English football came in 1997–98, by which time it had been renamed as the Second Division.) and the Fourth Division once. They have achieved promotion to the top level of English football on four occasions; as runners-up of the Second Division in 1981–82, and winners of the play-off final (often considered the richest game in football) in 1999 and 2006. They also gained automatic promotion in 2015, finishing second in the Championship. Their highest finish in the Football League was second in the First Division, achieved in 1982–83.

Watford's best performances in the FA Cup came in the 1984 FA Cup and 2019 FA cup, when they reached the final whilst suffering the biggest ever score line defeat in 2019. They have reached the semi-finals on four further occasions, and have also reached the semi-finals of the Football League Cup twice. On Watford's only appearance in a major European cup competition to date, they reached the third round of the UEFA Cup in 1983–84. They also won the Third Division South Cup in 1937; which was shared with Millwall after being level 3–3 over two legs.

=== The Football League ===
- Before the Premier League
  - First Division: Runners-up 1982–83
  - Second Division: Runners-up 1981–82
  - Third Division: Champions 1968–69
  - Third Division: Runners-up 1978–79
  - Third Division South: Highest finish: Fourth 1936–37, 1937–38, 1938–39, 1955–54
  - Fourth Division: Champions 1977–78
  - Fourth Division: Fourth place promotion 1959–60
- After the formation of the Premier League
  - Championship: Runners-up 2014–15, 2020–21
  - Championship: Play-off winners 1998–99, 2005–06
  - Division Two: Champions 1997–98

=== National cup competitions ===
- FA Cup
  - Finalists: 1983–84, 2018–19
  - Semi-Finalists: 1969–70, 1986–87, 2002–03, 2006–07, 2015–16
- League Cup
  - Semi-finalists: 1978–79, 2004–05

=== Other honours ===
- Southern League
  - First Division: Champions 1914–15
  - First Division: Runners-up 1919–20
  - Second Division: Champions 1899–1900, 1903–04
- UEFA Cup
  - Third round: 1983–84
- Football League Third Division South Cup
  - Winners 1936–37 (shared)
  - Runners-up 1934–35

== Records and statistics ==
All statistics correct as of 30 August 2023.

Highest Attendances

- Football League: 27,968 vs. Queens Park Rangers Second Division, 20 August 1969.
- FA Cup: 34,099 vs. Manchester United (4th round), 3 February 1969.
- Football League Cup: 27,656 vs. Nottingham Forest (semi-final, 2nd leg), 30 January 1979.
- UEFA Cup: 21,457 vs. 1. FC Kaiserslautern (1st round, 2nd leg), 28 September 1983.

Transfer Fees

- Paid: £40,000,000 to Rennes for Ismaïla Sarr, 8 August 2019.
- Received: £50,000,000 from Everton for Richarlison, 24 July 2018.

Goals

Team

- Most in League: 92, Division 4, 1959–60.

Individual

Most in a season:

- Southern League: 21, Bertie Banks (Division 2) 1903–04.
- Football League: 42, Cliff Holton (Division 4), 1959–60.
- FA Cup: 7, Charlie Hare, 1899–1900, and George James, 1930–31.
- League Cup: 7, Luther Blissett, 1978–79.
- UEFA Cup: 3, Ian Richardson and Wilf Rostron, 1983–84.

Most in a career:

- Overall: 186, Luther Blissett, 1976–1992.
- Football League: 148, Luther Blissett, 1976–1992.
- FA Cup: 16, Tommy Barnett, 1928–1939.
- League Cup: 17, Luther Blissett, 1976–1991.

Most in a match:

- Southern League: 6, Harry Barton vs. Wycombe Wanderers (Division 2), 26 September 1903.
- Football League: 5, Eddie Mummery vs Newport County (Division 3 South), 5 January 1924.
- FA Cup: 5, Thomas Ashbridge vs. Bournemouth F.C., 4th qualifying round, 29 November 1913.
- League Cup: 3, Ross Jenkins vs. Nottingham Forest (4th round), 28 October 1980; John Barnes vs. Cardiff City (2nd round, 1st leg), 25 September 1984.
- UEFA Cup: 2, Ian Richardson v. 1. FC Kaiserslautern (1st round, 2nd leg), 28 September 1983.

Appearances:

- Overall: 503, Luther Blissett (52 as a substitute), 1976–1992.
- League: 415, Luther Blissett (46 as a substitute), 1976–1992.
- FA Cup: 44, Wilf Rostron (1 as substitute), 1980–1988.
- League Cup: 44, Luther Blissett (3 as substitute), 1976–1992.
- UEFA Cup: 6, John Barnes, Nigel Callaghan, Richard Jobson (1 as a substitute), Wilf Rostron and Steve Sherwood.

Miscellaneous

- Youngest player: Keith Mercer, 16 years, 125 days vs. Tranmere Rovers, 16 February 1973.
- Oldest player: Southern League: John Goodall, 44 years, 87 days vs. Bradford Park Avenue, 14 September 1907.
- Oldest Football League player (including Premier League): Alec Chamberlain, 42 years, 327 days vs. Newcastle United, 13 May 2007.
