= Harry Kent (footballer) =

English footballer and manager

Henry Kent
Personal information
- Date of birth: 22 October 1879
- Place of birth: Bedworth, England
- Date of death: 22 December 1948 (aged 69)
- Place of death: Watford, England
- Position: Defender

Senior career*
Years	Team	Apps	(Gls)
	Notts County	0	(0)
1900–1901	Heanor Town		
1901–1902	Ilkeston Town		
1902–1905	Newark		
1905–1908	Brighton & Hove Albion	104	(11)
1908–1909	Middlesbrough	6	(0)
1909–1912	Watford	73	(6)

Managerial career
- 1910–1926: Watford
- * Club domestic league appearances and goals

Henry Kent (22 October 1879 – 22 December 1948) was an English football player and manager. He played as a centre half in the Football League for Middlesbrough and in the Southern League for Brighton & Hove Albion and Watford. He went on to manage Watford for 16 years, leading them to a Southern League Championship in the 1914–15 season, and into the Football League for the first time in 1920.

Described as 'a man of few words' by the Watford Observer, Kent never smoked, drank or swore. A 'model professional' as a player, he was well respected by his players as a manager. When coaching his team Kent insisted on high fitness levels.

== Playing career ==
Kent was born in Bedworth, Warwickshire. He played as a centre-half, beginning his playing career at Notts County but never broke into the first team. He became a professional at Heanor Town in 1900 before moving to Ilkeston Town in 1901 and then Newark in 1902.

In May 1905 he signed for Brighton & Hove Albion, with whom he stayed for three years. He then signed for Middlesbrough in April 1908 who were at that point playing in the top tier of English football, the First Division. He stayed in the North-East for just over a year, before signing for Southern League side Watford in August 1909. He went on to make 72 appearances for the club.

== Management ==
Following an unsuccessful 1909–10 season Watford dismissed manager John Goodall. Kent, the club's captain, was put in his place, as player-manager. Early in his career as manager Kent would submit his team to the club's board on a Friday before a game, although in later seasons he was able to make the final decision. In his first season at the helm Kent kept the club from relegation—finishing 14th—and halved the previous season's losses to £475. However, at the end of the campaign, due to a tight budget, he was made to sell or release several players at the board's insistence. This would become the most touchy thing he would do during Kent's reign, and each season Kent would scout out new players from the non-leagues in order to replace them. This meant that Kent's sides often featured players from the local area.

During the 1911–12 season, Kent was forced to retire from playing, due to a persistent knee injury. That season it took the club 6 games to record a victory. Good form thereafter led to hopes of the Championship, but a poor run of form in the spring saw the club finish 9th. This was followed by a 14th-place finish in 1912–13, where the club failed to win any of their last 7 home games, and a poor defensive record in 1913–14 meant that Watford were required to beat Q.P.R. in the final game of the season to avoid relegation. They did, winning 2–0. More positively, the club finished both seasons in profit.

Kent was forced to sell a number of players that summer, but with a side based around a number of local players (including Skilly Williams, Charlie White, and brothers Fred and Val Gregory) he led the club to the Southern League Championship in 1914–15.

At the end of the season the regular league programme was suspended, due to the outbreak of the First World War in 1914. Kent managed the side, made-up of mainly local players, in a variety of friendly competitions whilst working in a munitions factory in Essex.

== Post-war ==
Watford had suffered a financial crisis during the war, but following a fundraising meeting the club was able to resume in Southern League in 1919–20 with much the same side that had won the Championship in 1914–15. They finished in 2nd, after getting 25 points from a possible 28 in their final games.

Kent was then to oversee a period of change. Watford joined the newly formed Football League Division Three in 1920, and Kent led the club to a 6th-placed finish. Struggling in the 1920–21 season, Kent was allocated the fee from the sale of Frank Hoddinott to sign a player that would drive the club up the league. That was Fred Pagnam signed for £1000 – by far a club record fee. In 1922 Watford moved to their new ground, Vicarage Road.

In the following seasons Watford struggled financially, and went on to record a series of finishes, including a 20th-placed finish in 1923–24. During the 1924–25 season Kent took the role of secretary-manager, without any addition to his salary (£312 per annum). At the end of the 1925–26 season, when the club finished 15th, Watford released a brief statement saying that Kent had resigned. He was replaced by his record signing of 1921, Fred Pagnam.

== Pub landlord ==
Kent had been the landlord of the Wellington Arms public house in Woodford Road, Watford since 1922. After his departure from the club this would become his full-time profession until his death in Watford in 1948. A 'typical Victorian gentleman', Kent was a well-dressed and well-respected landlord of the busy establishment. During the Second World War Kent refused requests from American soldiers to segregate his pub.

Kent is buried in the cemetery on Vicarage Road, close to the club's ground.
