= 1914–15 Watford F.C. season =

English football team season

Watford
1914–15 season
- Stadium: Cassio Road
- Southern League First Division: 1st
- FA Cup: Sixth qualifying round (eliminated by Rochdale)
- Southern Charity Cup: First round (eliminated by Luton Town)
- Top goalscorer: League: George Edmonds (17); All: George Edmonds (17)
- Highest home attendance: 8,000 (vs Luton Town, 2 April 1915)
- Lowest home attendance: 1,000 (vs Southend United, 3 February 1915)
Home colours

Watford Football Club are an association football team from the county of Hertfordshire, England. The 1914–15 season was their nineteenth season of league football, since joining the Southern League as West Hertfordshire for the 1896–97 season. Watford finished the season as champions of the Southern League First Division, winning 22 and drawing 8 of their 38 league matches. In other competitions, Watford were eliminated from the FA Cup in the sixth qualifying round by Rochdale, and from the Southern Charity Cup by fellow Southern League team Luton Town. The club's manager was Harry Kent, and its top scorer George Edmonds, with 17 goals from 35 appearances. Other notable players included Skilly Williams, who began what would be a 13-year period as the club's first choice goalkeeper, and Fred Gregory, whose goal against Gillingham sealed the title for Watford. Gregory and Williams were also the only two men to play in all 40 of Watford's games.

As a result of the suspension of league football due to the First World War, Watford were the reigning champions for the next five years, until they were beaten to the 1919–20 title on goal average by Portsmouth.

== Background ==
Although he had managed Watford since the departure of John Goodall in 1910, Harry Kent made two final competitive appearances in December 1913, before retiring completely as a player. Watford lost both matches, and off the pitch Kent had an equally difficult season. Watford finished in 18th position in the Southern League First Division, and only managed to avoid relegation on the final day of the season with a 2–0 win over QPR. Despite a 10–0 thrashing of Bournemouth in their opening FA Cup match, they were defeated by Gillingham in the following round. Furthermore, financial difficulties forced Kent to offload several key players at the end of the season. Top scorer Thomas Ashbridge and full back Harry Pantling were sold to Sheffield United for £500 each, while first choice goalkeeper Joe Webster transferred to West Ham United for £300. Other former first team regulars to leave the club before the start of 1914–15 included David Donald, Billy Dryden and Tommy Mitchell.

== Southern League ==
Despite Britain's declaration of war in August 1914, the Southern League continued as normal for the 1914–15 season. Watford started their campaign on 2 September with a 2–1 win against Cardiff F.C. They continued their strong start to the season with a run of 6 wins and 3 defeats from the opening 9 fixtures, including a 3–0 home win against 1913–14 champions Swindon Town. However, the following two fixtures yielded consecutive league defeats to Reading and Southampton, and Watford's remaining 8 games of 1914 provided only two further wins.

The new year brought a dramatic change in fortunes for Watford's season. Watford won 10 and drew 2 of their first 12 games of 1915, with George Edmonds, Peter Ronald and injured Charlie White's replacement Arthur Green all scoring freely. A win and a defeat against Luton Town, a 2–0 defeat to West Ham United and a heavy 6–0 loss at Swindon enabled Reading and Cardiff to close in on Watford's points tally and goal average. But Watford secured the title in their penultimate match, with Fred Gregory scoring the decisive goal in a 3–2 win at Gillingham.

== Results ==
Legend

Win Draw Loss

=== Southern League ===
2 September 1914	Watford	2–1	Cardiff City	Cassio Road
	Ronald; White		Goal	Attendance: 1,500

5 September 1914	Portsmouth	2–3	Watford	Fratton Park
	Goal		Edmonds; Ronald; White	Attendance: 7,000

12 September 1914	Watford	3–0	Swindon Town	Cassio Road
	Edmonds; White own goal			Attendance: 3,000

16 September 1914	Watford	0–0	Brighton & Hove Albion	Cassio Road
				Attendance: 1,500

19 September 1914	Southend United	0–0	Watford	Kursaal
				Attendance: 4,000

26 September 1914	Watford	2–2	QPR	Cassio Road
	Edmonds; Hastings		Goal	Attendance: 5,000

3 October 1914	Millwall	0–3	Watford	The Den
			Tattersall	Attendance: 15,000

10 October 1914	Watford	2–0	Bristol Rovers	Cassio Road
	Val Gregory; Ronald			Attendance: 3,000

17 October 1914	Croydon Common	0–1	Watford	Croydon Common Athletic Ground
			Edmonds	Attendance: 6,000

24 October 1914	Watford	0–1	Reading	Cassio Road
			Goal	Attendance: 5,000

31 October 1914	Southampton	3–1	Watford	The Dell
	Goal		Hastings

7 November 1914	Watford	0–0	Northampton Town	Cassio Road
				Attendance: 6,000

14 November 1914	Watford	1–0	Crystal Palace	Cassio Road
	Hastings

21 November 1914	Plymouth Argyle	1–1	Watford	Home Park
	Goal		own goal

28 November 1914	Watford	0–1	West Ham United	Cassio Road
			Goal

5 December 1914	Norwich City	2–0	Watford	The Nest (football ground)
	Goal			Attendance: 3,000

12 December 1914	Watford	4–0	Gillingham	Cassio Road
	McLauchlan; Waterall			Attendance: 2,500

25 December 1914	Watford	1–1	Exeter City	Cassio Road
	McLauchlan		Goal	Attendance: 2,000

26 December 1914	Exeter City	4–1	Watford	St James Park
	Goal		Hastings	Attendance: 6,000

1 January 1915	Cardiff City	2–3	Watford	Ninian Park
	Goal		Edmonds; Green; Tattersall	Attendance: 1,900

2 January 1915	Watford	2–1	Portsmouth	Cassio Road
	Edmonds		Goal	Attendance: 3,000

23 January 1915	Reading	1–1	Watford	Elm Park
	Goal		White

3 February 1915	Watford	2–1	Southend United	Cassio Road
	Ronald own goal		Goal	Attendance: 1,000

13 February 1915	Bristol Rovers	2–3	Watford	Eastville Stadium
	Goal		Edmonds; Green	Attendance: 1,000

20 February 1915	Watford	3–0	Croydon Common	Cassio Road
	Hastings; Ronald			Attendance: 3,000

27 February 1915	Watford	4–0	Millwall	Cassio Road
	Edmonds; Green; Hastings; Ronald			Attendance: 3,000

6 March 1915	Watford	5–2	Southampton	Cassio Road
	Green; Hastings; Kennedy; Ronald; Tattersall		Goal

13 March 1915	Northampton Town	1–1	Watford	Eastville Stadium
	Goal		Val Gregory	Attendance: 10,000

18 March 1915	QPR	2–5	Watford	Loftus Road
	Goal		Edmonds; Green; Val Gregory; Tattersall	Attendance: 5,000

20 March 1915	Crystal Palace	0–1	Watford	The Crystal Palace
			Tattersall

27 March 1915	Watford	2–0	Plymouth Argyle	Cassio Road
	Edmonds; Tattersall			Attendance: 3,000

2 April 1915	Watford	2–4	Luton Town	Cassio Road
	Kennedy; Ronald		Goal	Attendance: 8,000

3 April 1915	West Ham United	2–0	Watford	Boleyn Ground
	Goal			Attendance: 10,000

5 April 1915	Luton Town	0–2	Watford	Kenilworth Road
			Edmonds; Fred Gregory	Attendance: 7,000

6 April 1915	Swindon Town	6–0	Watford	County Ground
	Goal			Attendance: 1,000

10 April 1915	Watford	2–1	Norwich City	Cassio Road
	Edmonds; Kennedy		Goal

17 April 1915	Gillingham	2–3	Watford	Priestfield Stadium
	Goal		Edmonds; Green; Fred Gregory

24 April 1915	Brighton & Hove Albion	1–2	Watford	Goldstone Ground
	Goal		Edmonds; Green	Attendance: 3,000

=== FA Cup ===
19 December 1914 Sixth qualifying round	Rochdale	2–0	Watford	Spotlands
	Goal			Attendance: 4,000

=== Southern Charity Cup ===
4 November 1914 First round	Luton Town	2–0	Watford	Kenilworth Road
	Goal

== Final standings ==
Two points were awarded for a win, one point for draws, and none for defeats. Due to the war, no clubs were relegated at the end of the season, although Croydon Common ceased trading before the start of the 1919–20 season.

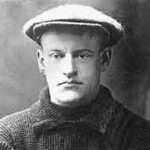
Goalkeeper Skilly Williams played in every competitive game.

Pos	Team	Pld	W	D	L	GF	GA	GR	Pts	Qualification or relegation
1	Watford	38	22	8	8	68	46	1.478	52	
2	Reading	38	21	7	10	68	43	1.581	49	
3	Cardiff City	38	22	4	12	72	38	1.895	48	
4	West Ham United	38	18	9	11	58	47	1.234	45	Elected to the 1919–20 Football League Second Division after World War I
5	Northampton Town	38	19	5	14	56	51	1.098	43	

Rules for classification: The system of using goal average to separate two teams tied on points was used up until the 1976–77 season. The points system: 2 points for a win, 1 point for a draw and 0 points for losing.

== Players ==
=== Statistics ===
Key

P: Games played

G: Goals scored

A depiction of the 2–3–5 formation used by Watford for the majority of the season. Wingers were then more commonly referred to as outside forwards; the wide and central half backs were known as wing halves and centre halves respectively.

Position	P	G	P	G	P	G	
Position	League		Cups		Total		
Bob Barnshaw	Centre half	11	0	0	0	11	0
Harold Bulling	Full back	35	0	2	0	37	0
George Edmonds	Centre forward	35	17	1	0	36	17
Albert Green	Inside forward	23	8	0	0	23	8
Fred Gregory	Full back / Wing half	38	2	2	0	40	2
Val Gregory	Wing half	32	3	1	0	33	3
Ernie Grimsdell	Full back	1	0	0	0	1	0
William Hastings	Outside forward	34	6	2	0	36	6
Sam Hatton	Full back	0	0	1	0	1	0
Jim Kennedy	Centre half	32	3	2	0	34	3
James McGuire	Outside forward	3	0	0	0	3	0
Joe McLauchlan	Centre forward	6	3	2	0	8	3
F.A. McMorran	Wing half	6	0	1	0	7	0
Peter Ronald	Inside forward	35	9	1	0	36	9
Alex Stewart	Full back	37	0	1	0	38	0
Tommy Waterall	Outside forward	33	10	2	0	35	10
Charlie White	Inside forward	19	4	2	0	21	4
Skilly Williams	Goalkeeper	38	0	2	0	40	0
