= Tommy Waterall =

English footballer

Personal information
- Full name: Thomas William Waterall
- Date of birth: 24 October 1884
- Place of birth: Radford, England
- Date of death: 8 November 1951 (aged 67)
- Place of death: Nottingham, England
- Height: 5 ft 9 in (1.75 m)
- Position: Left winger

Youth career
- Radford Institute
- –: Eleanor United

Senior career*
Years	Team	Apps	(Gls)
1906–1908	Notts County	28	(5)
1908–1909	Bradford Park Avenue	4	(0)
1909–1913	Mansfield Mechanics		
1913–1914	Leicester Fosse	31	(6)
1914–1921	Watford	108	(19)
1921–1922	Gillingham	18	(1)
–	Sheppey United		
–	Sittingbourne		
- * Club domestic league appearances and goals

Thomas William Waterall (24 October 1884 – 8 November 1951) was an English footballer. He played as an outside left in the Football League and Southern League.

Waterall started his working life as a miner, becoming a professional footballer for the first time in 1906. After spells in the Football League with Notts County, Bradford Park Avenue and Leicester Fosse, Waterall joined Southern League side Watford in July 1914. He did not play any part in Watford's first five fixtures of the 1914–15 season, but was everpresent thereafter, and scored a hat-trick on his second appearance for the club, in a 3–0 away win against Millwall. Watford went on to win the Southern League that season. After the resumption of peacetime football following the First World War, he spent two furthers seasons as a regular in the team. He was a part of the side that finished second in the Southern League on goal average in 1919–20, and the following season Waterall played in Watford's first ever Football League fixture, a 2–1 away win at Queens Park Rangers on 28 August 1920. At the end of the 1920–21 season, Waterall joined Gillingham on a free transfer.

Two of his brothers, Albert and Ike were professional footballers; both started their careers at Notts County. Albert later played for Stockport County and Ike for Millwall.
