= Peter Ronald =

English footballer

Personal information
- Full name: Peter Mann Ronald
- Date of birth: 5 November 1889
- Place of birth: Walker, Newcastle upon Tyne, England
- Date of death: 21 April 1953 (aged 63)
- Place of death: Watford, Hertfordshire, England
- Height: 5 ft 11 in (1.80 m)
- Position: Inside right

Senior career*
Years	Team	Apps	(Gls)
19xx–1914	Hebburn Argyle		
1914–1921	Watford	99	(29)
1921–1923	Nottingham Forest		
1923–1924	West Stanley		
1924–1925	Watford	0	(0)
- * Club domestic league appearances and goals

Peter Mann Ronald (5 November 1889 – 21 April 1953) was an English association footballer. During his career he played for Hebburn Argyle, Watford, Nottingham Forest and West Stanley, primarily as an inside right. Following his retirement as a player, he coached Watford between 1926 and 1946.

== Career ==
Born in Newcastle upon Tyne, Ronald started his career at nearby Hebburn Argyle, before transferring to Watford in June 1914 for an undisclosed fee. Despite the outbreak of the First World War, the Southern League continued for the 1914–15 season. Ronald quickly established himself as a regular starter in Watford's team, making 36 appearances and scoring 9 goals as Watford secured the Southern League title. He did not play for the club during wartime league matches, but did return for the 1919–20 season, scoring 10 of Watford's 69 goals as they finished as runners up in the Southern League to Portsmouth on goal average. Ronald's third season at Watford coincided with their first in the newly formed Football League Third Division. On 28 August 1920, Ronald scored his team's opening goal in a 2–1 win over QPR at Loftus Road, thereby becoming the first man ever to score for Watford in the Football League.

At the end of the 1920–21 season, Ronald transferred to Nottingham Forest, for a fee of £500. After two seasons largely as a reserve player, he moved to West Stanley in 1923, before rejoining Watford the following year. After failing to make a first team appearance, Ronald retired as a player in 1925, remaining as a coach until the conclusion of the Second World War and resumption of peacetime football in 1946. He died in Watford seven years later, aged 63.

== Honours ==
- Southern League Division 1:
  - Winner: 1914–15
  - Runner up: 1919–20
