= Fred Gregory (footballer, born 1886) =

English footballer

Personal information
- Full name: Frederick James Gregory
- Date of birth: 21 October 1886
- Place of birth: Pinner, Middlesex, England
- Date of death: 24 May 1937 (aged 50)
- Place of death: Harefield, Middlesex, England
- Positions: Left back; half back; inside forward

Youth career
- Pinner

Senior career*
Years	Team	Apps	(Gls)
1911–1928	Watford	311	(13)
Total		311	(13)
- * Club domestic league appearances and goals

Frederick James Gregory (21 October 1886 – 24 May 1937) was an English footballer who played for Watford, initially as an inside forward, and latterly as a half back and full back.

== Early and personal life ==
Gregory was born in Pinner in 1886. The second of six sons, Gregory was named after his father, who was a tenant farmer at Pinner Hill Farm, and later the licensee of Oddfellows pub in Pinner. He was educated at Pinner National School, and played his first game of men's football aged 11, for Pinner Football Club's reserves. In his early adult years, his primary sporting focus was cricket; he played as a batsman for Pinner CC and Eastcote CC, before coaching the Benskins Brewery cricket team. Gregory joined Watford as an amateur in 1911, turning professional later the same year. He was subsequently joined by three of his brothers: Val, Allan and Owen. At one stage, all four of them were contracted to the club simultaneously, although only Fred and Val went on to play for the first-team.

== Watford ==
Gregory made his Watford debut on 30 September 1911, playing at inside forward as Watford won 2–0 against West Ham United at Cassio Road. He went on to play every game in October and November, and was still in the team when Val made his debut on 25 December, in a 1–1 draw at home to Luton Town. Fred continued to play on a regular basis from then on, and finished his first season with 25 appearances and 8 goals in all competitions, as the club finished 9th. Over the following two seasons he continued to play regularly, but the team dropped 14th in the 1912–13 season, and narrowly avoided relegation in 1913–14 with an 18th-placed finish.

Despite Britain's participation in the First World War, the 1914–15 season continued as scheduled. Gregory played in all 38 league matches, and his goal in the penultimate game secured a 3–2 win at Gillingham, ensuring that Watford finished the season as Southern League champions. As a result of the war, peacetime competitions were suspended from 1915 until 1919. Gregory served in the Royal Garrison Artillery, but also made 53 appearances for Watford in wartime fixtures. On the resumption of peacetime football in 1919–20, Gregory played 34 league games. His last appearance alongside Val came on 5 April 1920, in a 2–1 win against Luton; at the end of the season Val left the club to join Wolverhampton Wanderers, for a then-record Watford fee of £1,500. Watford came close to defending their title, but eventually missed out to Portsmouth on the final day of the season on goal average.

Watford, along with all other Southern League First Division clubs, joined the newly formed Football League Third Division in 1920. Gregory captained the team in their first ever Football League game, a 2–1 away win against Queens Park Rangers on 28 August. The team finished the season in 6th position, with Gregory making 21 league appearances. Over the next five seasons, Gregory continued to play frequently, making at least 20 appearances per season as a left back, and regularly attracting praise from journalists covering Watford's opposition. He scored in his final home game for Watford, in a 3–2 win over Swindon Town. However, his professional career ended in a 6–1 defeat at Exeter City, on 1 May 1926.

== Later life and final years ==
Although he ultimately did not make another first-team appearance, Gregory remained at Watford for a further two seasons, and made several appearances for the reserves. He became landlord of The Victory pub in Pinner in 1926, a role that he continued for the remainder of his life. In his later years he suffered from tuberculosis, and he spent the final four months of his life at a sanatorium in Harefield. Gregory died on 24 May 1937, aged 50.
