= Val Gregory =

English footballer

Personal information
- Full name: Valentine Francis Gregory
- Date of birth: 14 February 1888
- Place of birth: Pinner, Middlesex, England
- Date of death: 10 March 1940 (aged 52)
- Place of death: Wolverhampton, Staffordshire, England
- Height: 5 ft 9 1/4 in (1.76 m)
- Position: Half back

Youth career
- Pinner

Senior career*
Years	Team	Apps	(Gls)
1911–1920	Watford	155	(13)
1920–1925	Wolverhampton Wanderers	96	(2)
- Butler Sports
- Wolverhampton
- * Club domestic league appearances and goals

Valentine Francis Gregory (14 February 1888 – 10 March 1940) was an English footballer who played as a half back. He won the 1914–15 Southern League title with Watford, and captained Wolverhampton Wanderers in the 1921 FA Cup Final.

== Early and personal life ==
Gregory was born in Pinner, Middlesex on Valentine's Day 1888, leading to him being christened Valentine. Val was the third son of Fred Gregory, a tenant farmer at Pinner Hill Farm, and later the licensee of Oddfellows pub in Pinner. He joined Watford three months after his elder brother, also named Fred, and at one stage he, Fred, and younger brothers Allan and Owen were all contracted to Watford simultaneously, although only he and Fred went on to play for the club competitively.

== Career ==
After starting his career in amateur football with Pinner Football Club, Gregory joined Watford as a professional in December 1911. He made his debut on 25 December, in a 1–1 draw at Luton alongside elder brother Fred. His first goal followed shortly after, in a 1–0 win over Exeter City on 30 December 1911, and by the end of the 1911–12 season Val had made 16 Southern League appearances, scoring twice. He established himself as a first-team regular over the following two seasons, missing only five of Watford's 84 games.

Watford narrowly avoided relegation in the 1913–14 season with an 18th-placed finish, but Gregory and Watford started the following season with a nine match unbeaten run. He played only three of their next ten matches, coinciding with six Watford defeats over the same period. From 25 December onwards he was ever-present, and Watford secured the Southern League title on the penultimate game of the season, with Fred scoring the title-winning goal in a 3–2 win against Gillingham.

Normal peacetime competitions were suspended between 1915 and 1919 due to the First World War. While serving as a sergeant in the Middlesex Regiment, Gregory made 43 wartime appearances for Watford, and also made guest appearances for Arsenal. The Southern League resumed in 1919–20, which proved to be Gregory's last season at the club. He made 35 appearances and scored twice, but Watford lost out on the title to Portsmouth on goal average.

In May 1920, Gregory joined Football League side Wolverhampton Wanderers for what was at the time a Watford record transfer fee of £1,500. He was joined by former Watford teammate George Edmonds, the top scorer from the title-winning season. Despite being a Second Division side, Wolves overcame Stoke City, Derby County, Fulham, Everton and Cardiff City to reach the 1921 FA Cup Final. Gregory captained his team in the final at Stamford Bridge, but they were defeated 1–0 by Tottenham Hotspur.

Gregory spent the remainder of his professional career at Wolves, making his final appearances for the team in the 1922–23 season that saw the club relegated to the third tier. He became a player-coach in 1925, and finished his playing days as an amateur for Butler Sports and Wolverhampton Football Club. He finally ended his service as a coach at Molineux in 1938 due to ill health.

== Later life and death ==
After retirement, Gregory remained in Wolverhampton, and once refereed a charity match held at Molineux, Wolverhampton Wanderers' home. He died in March 1940 in Wolverhampton, aged 52.

== Honours ==
Wolverhampton Wanderers

- FA Cup runner-up: 1920–21
