= George Edmonds (footballer) =

English footballer (1893–1989)

Personal information
- Full name: George William Neville Edmonds
- Date of birth: 4 April 1893
- Place of birth: Finsbury, London
- Date of death: 10 December 1989 (aged 96)
- Place of death: Ryde, Isle of Wight
- Height: 5 ft 5 in (1.65 m)
- Position: Centre forward

Youth career
- Watford schools

Senior career*
Years	Team	Apps	(Gls)
1909–1910	St Stephens		
1910–1911	Andre & Sleigh		
1911–1912	Watford Wednesday		
1912–1913	St Albans City		
1913–1920	Watford	85	(45)
1920–1923	Wolverhampton Wanderers	115	(38)
1923–1926	Fulham	66	(23)
1926–1927	Watford	22	(12)
1927–?	Northfleet United		
- * Club domestic league appearances and goals

George William Neville Edmonds (4 April 1893 – 10 December 1989) was an English professional footballer. He played as a centre forward for St Albans City, Watford, Wolverhampton Wanderers (Wolves), Fulham and Northfleet United. On three occasions he finished as Watford's top scorer, including in 1914–15 when they won the Southern League. He later played in the 1921 FA Cup final for Wolves.

== Early career and Watford ==
Edmonds went to school in the town of Watford, Hertfordshire, and started playing football for his school teams. After leaving school, he played for local clubs St Stephens, Andre & Sleigh and Watford Wednesday, whilst working in Watford's print industry. He then joined St Albans City in 1912, still as an amateur. He joined Watford for 1913–14. Despite signing professional terms at the end of the season, he continued to work as a printer until his departure from the club, and resumed doing so on his return in 1926. The following season, Watford won the Southern League; Edmonds finished as the club's top scorer with 17 goals in 35 appearances.

The Southern League was suspended for the next four seasons, as a result of the First World War. During this time (in which he worked in munitions), Edmonds scored 7 goals in 6 Watford wartime matches, and also made guest appearances for Crystal Palace. Upon the resumption of league football in 1919–20, Edmonds again top-scored for Watford with 19 goals in 37 matches. However, he and Watford missed out on a second consecutive league title to Portsmouth on goal average.

== Later career ==
In May 1920, Edmonds moved to Wolverhampton Wanderers for a fee of £1,500. At the same time, Val Gregory made the same move for an identical fee. At Wolves, Edmonds played in the Football League for the first time. They finished the season 15th in the Second Division, and Edmonds and Gregory both played for Wolves as they were defeated in the 1921 FA Cup final. Edmonds stayed at Wolves for two further seasons. After their relegation in 1923, he remained a Second Division player by joining Fulham. Fulham finished in the bottom half of the table for three consecutive years, and in 1926 Edmonds rejoined former club Watford for a fee of £250. His final season at the club was a mixed one; Watford finished 21st out of 22 teams in the Third Division South, but for the third time Edmonds scored the most goals of any Watford player, with 12 goals from his 22 appearances. At the end of the season he joined Northfleet United, and in 1930 he became a coach at Bushey United, near Watford.

Edmonds died in Ryde, Isle of Wight on 10 December 1989, aged 96.

== Honours ==
Watford

- Southern League: 1914–15; runner-up: 1919–20

Wolverhampton Wanderers

- FA Cup runner-up: 1920–21

Individual

- Watford top scorer: 1914–15, 1919–20, 1926–27
