= Tommy White (footballer, born 1881) =

English footballer (1881–c.1909)

Personal information
- Full name: Thomas Henry White
- Date of birth: 12 November 1881
- Place of birth: Tring, England
- Position: Outside right

Senior career*
Years	Team	Apps	(Gls)
- Chesham Generals
- Grays United
1904–1906	Brighton & Hove Albion	29	(1)
1906–1907	Stockport County	32	(1)
1907–1908	Carlisle United		
1908–1909	Exeter City		
1909–1910	Watford	3	(0)
- * Club domestic league appearances and goals

Thomas Henry White (12 November 1881 – after 1909) was an English footballer who played as an outside right for Stockport County in the Football League. He also played for Chesham Generals, Grays United, Brighton & Hove Albion, Carlisle United, Exeter City and Watford. At Watford and Chesham, White played alongside his younger brother, Charlie.
