= Jimmy Kennedy (footballer) =

Scottish association footballer

Personal information
- Full name: James John Kennedy
- Date of birth: 8 May 1883
- Place of birth: Dundee, Scotland
- Date of death: 20 July 1947 (aged 64)
- Place of death: Glasgow, Scotland
- Position: Half back

Senior career*
Years	Team	Apps	(Gls)
1903–1905	Celtic	0	(0)
1905–1906	Brighton & Hove Albion	11	(1)
1906–1908	Leeds City	58	(1)
1909	Stockport County	18	(1)
1909–1911	Tottenham Hotspur	13	(1)
1912–1913	Swindon Town	14	(0)
1913	Norwich City	4	(0)
1913–1915	Watford	51	(3)
1915–1919	Brentford		
1917–1919	→ Airdrieonians (guest)	59	(8)
1918–1919	→ St Mirren (guest)	2	(0)
1919–1920	Gillingham	9	(0)
- * Club domestic league appearances and goals

James John Kennedy (8 May 1883 – 20 July 1947) was a Scottish professional footballer who played for Celtic, Brighton & Hove Albion, Leeds City, Stockport County, Tottenham Hotspur, Swindon Town, Norwich City, Watford and Gillingham.

== Football career ==
Kennedy played for Celtic and Brighton & Hove Albion before joining Leeds City in 1906. The defender played in 60 matches and scored once between 1906 and 1908 for the Yorkshire club. He moved to Stockport County where he played a further 20 matches before joining Tottenham Hotspur. Kennedy featured in 13 matches and scored once in his career at White Hart Lane, which was followed by short spells at Swindon Town and Norwich City. He then joined Watford, captaining them to the Southern League title in 1914–15 after his predecessor Alex Stewart enlisted for military service. He joined Brentford during the First World War and played as a guest for Aidrieonians and St Mirren. Upon the resumption of peacetime football in 1919, Kennedy finished his career at Gillingham. He served as the club's trainer between 1920 and 1922 and then acted as trainer for Partick Thistle until his death in 1947.
