= Frank Hoddinott =

Wales boxer

Personal information
- Full name: Francis Hoddinott
- Date of birth: 26 November 1894
- Place of birth: Brecon, Wales
- Date of death: 12 November 1980
- Place of death: Southend, England
- Height: 5 ft 8 in (1.73 m)
- Position: Centre forward

Senior career*
Years	Team	Apps	(Gls)
1913–191x	Aberdare Athletic		
1919–1921	Watford	52	(29)
1921–1923	Chelsea	31	(4)
1923–1926	Crystal Palace	79	(20)
1926–1927	Rhyl		
1927–1928	New Brighton	23	(6)
1928–1930	Newark Town		
1930–193x	Grantham Town		

International career
1921	Wales	2	(0)

Managerial career
- 1929–1930: Newark Town
- 1930–193x: Grantham Town
- * Club domestic league appearances and goals

Francis Hoddinott (26 November 1894 – 12 November 1980), also known as Tom Hoddinott, was a Welsh association footballer. As well as being a professional footballer, he also boxed professionally in the 1920s.

== Career ==
Born in Brecon, Hoddinott started his career in the Southern League with Aberdare Athletic, before moving to reigning Southern League champions Watford in 1919. Hoddinott's opportunities were limited in 1919–20; he played 13 of Watford's 43 fixtures, scoring 7 goals. Watford joined the Football League the following season. Hoddinott finished it as Watford's top scorer with 25 goals in all competitions. Additionally, he became the first player in Watford's history to earn international caps whilst at the club, and at the end of the season was sold to Chelsea for a fee of £3,500; higher than anything Watford had previously received.

However, Hoddinott was unable to maintain the form he had shown at Watford, scoring only 4 goals in 31 Chelsea league matches. He subsequently joined Crystal Palace in 1923, Rhyl in 1926 and New Brighton in 1927. Towards the end of his playing career, Hoddinott player-managed Newark Town and Grantham Town, before joining Chelmsford City as a coach in 1933.
