= Herts Senior Cup =

- Flag of Hertfordshire
- Founded: 1886
- Region: Hertfordshire; England
- Teams: 22
- Current champions: Hitchin Town (15th title)
- Most championships: Barnet (19 titles)
- Website: hertfordshirefa.com/cup

The Hertfordshire County Football Association Senior Challenge Cup, commonly called the Herts Senior Cup, is the oldest County-based football Cup competition based exclusively in Hertfordshire, England. It was first contested in the 1886-87 season and won by Hoddesdon Town. It has been contested every year since except for the years 1915 to 1918 when it was suspended during World War I. It is usually contested by the twenty-two most senior Clubs in the County, though this number has been higher and lower in previous years.

Finals have nearly always been staged at a neutral venue in the County, apart from a few seasons in the mid-1960s when the final was played over two-legs. Since the 2004-05 season, finals have been staged at the Herts FA's headquarters at the County Ground, Letchworth Garden City, with the exception of 2010-11, when the final was moved to Underhill as the final was contested between two Football League clubs, Barnet and Stevenage, prompting safety concerns.

The current holders are Hitchin Town, who defeated Bishop's Stortford in penalties following a 0–0 at Top Field.

== Results ==
Season	Winner	Score	Runner-up
1886–87	Hoddesdon	5–2	Watford Rovers
1887–88	Hoddesdon	4–3	Watford Rovers
1888–89	Watford Rovers	2–0	Hoddesdon
1889–90	Hoddesdon	3–3	St Albans
	Hoddesdon	5–0	St Albans
1890–91	Watford Rovers	6–2	St Albans
1891–92	Watford Rovers	5–2	Hoddesdon
1892–93	St Albans	4–1	West Hertfordshire Association
1893–94	West Hertfordshire	5–1	West Hertfordshire Association
1894–95	Hitchin	2–0	Watford St. Marys
1895–96	Hitchin	3–1	Apsley
1896–97	West Hertfordshire	2–1	Hitchin
1897–98	Hitchin	2–1	Aldenham School
1898–99	Ware	2–1	Hitchin
1899–1900	Hitchin	2–1	Hemel Hempstead
1900–01	St Albans Amateurs	1–1 (Note: Awarded to St Albans Amateurs after Stanville failed to appear for the replay.)	Stanville
1901–02	St Albans Amateurs	4–2	Ware
1902–03	Hitchin	2–0	Ware
1903–04	Ware	2–2	St Albans Amateurs
	Ware	3–1	St Albans Amateurs
1904–05	Hitchin	2–0	Watford Victoria Works
1905–06	Apsley	4–1	Ware
1906–07	Ware	5–1	Hitchin Blue Cross
1907–08	Apsley	4–1	Hitchin
1908–09	Apsley	3–0	Waltham Glendale
1909–10	Hitchin	2–1	Hoddesdon
1910–11	Waltham Glendale	3–1	St Albans City
1911–12	Leavesden Asylum	5–1	Hoddesdon
1912–13	Letchworth Athletic	1–0	Harpenden
1913–14	Leavesden Asylum	4–1	Hitchin Union Jack
1914–15		Not played	
1915–16		Not played	
1916–17		Not played	
1917–18		Not played	
1918–19		Not played	
1919–20	Leavesden Mental Hospital	1–0	Welwyn
1920–21	Watford Old Boys	2–1	Hitchin Blue Cross
1921–22	Ware	3–3	Apsley
	Ware	1–1	Apsley
	Ware	2–0	Apsley
1922–23	Hitchin Blue Cross	1–0	Watford Old Boys
1923–24	Cheshunt	3–0	Hoddesdon Town
1924–25	St Albans City	2–1	Leavesden Mental Hospital
1925–26	Apsley	3–1	Cheshunt
1926–27	Watford Old Boys	6–4	Ware
1927–28	Watford Old Boys	3–1*	Baldock Town
1928–29	St Albans City	1-0	Apsley
1929–30	Leavesden Mental Hospital	3–2	Apsley
1930–31	Hitchin Town	0–0	Leavesden Mental Hospital
	Hitchin Town	3–0	Leavesden Mental Hospital
1931–32	Hitchin Town	5–1	Apsley
1932–33	Bishop's Stortford	3–1	Bushey United
1933–34	Hitchin Town	3–2	Hertford Town
1934–35	St Albans City	4–2*	Leavesden Mental Hospital
1935–36	Letchworth Town	3–1	Leavesden Mental Hospital
1936–37	Leavesden Mental Hospital	2–1	Apsley
1937–38	Hitchin Town	4–1	Leavesden Mental Hospital
1938–39	Hitchin Town	1–1	Leavesden Mental Hospital
	Hitchin Town	3–0	Leavesden Mental Hospital
1939–40	Barnet	4–2	Hitchin Town
1940–41	Hitchin Town	3–2	Leavesden Mental Hospital
1941–42	Barnet	3–1	St Albans City
1942–43	Hitchin Town	5–1	St Albans City
1943–44	St Albans City	4–1	Hitchin Town
1944–45	Barnet	8–0	Hitchin Town
1945–46	Barnet	6–0	R.E.M.E. (Cupid Green)
1946–47	St Albans City	5–2	Berkhamsted Town
1947–48	Barnet	3–1	St Albans City
1948–49	Barnet	3–1	Cheshunt
1949–50	Barnet	3–1*	Cheshunt
1950–51	St Albans City	3–0	Hitchin Town
1951–52	Letchworth Town	1–0	Hoddesdon Town
1952–53	Berkhamsted Town	4–2	St Albans City
1953–54	Ware	1–0	Barnet
1954–55	St Albans City	1–0	Bishop's Stortford
1955–56	St Albans City	4–1	Letchworth Town
1956–57	St Albans City	5–1	Hitchin Town
1957–58	Barnet	2–1	St Albans City
1958–59	Bishop's Stortford	2–0	Barnet
1959–60	Bishop's Stortford	1–0	Barnet
1960–61	Barnet	3–0	Letchworth Town
1961–62	Hitchin Town	2–0	Hemel Hempstead
1962–63	Barnet	1–1	Hertford Town
	Barnet	2–1	Hertford Town
1963–64	Bishop's Stortford	3–2	Hertford Town
	Bishop's Stortford	1–1	Hertford Town
1964–65	Barnet	2–2	St Albans City
	Barnet	3–0	St Albans City
1965–66	St Albans City	0–0	Hemel Hempstead
	St Albans City	2–1	Hemel Hempstead
1966–67	Hertford Town	5–2	Boreham Wood
	Hertford Town	0–2	Boreham Wood
1967–68	St Albans City	1–0	Hertford Town
1968–69	St Albans City	3–2	Cheshunt
1969–70	Hitchin Town	1–0*	Cheshunt
1970–71	Bishop's Stortford	1–1	St Albans City
	Bishop's Stortford	1–0	St Albans City
1971–72	Boreham Wood	2–0	Cheshunt
1972–73	Bishop's Stortford	2–0*	Hitchin Town
1973–74	Bishop's Stortford	2–1	Cheshunt
1974–75	Hitchin Town	2–0	Boreham Wood
1975–76	Bishop's Stortford	3–1	Watford
1976–77	Hitchin Town	2–0	Bishop's Stortford
1977–78	Watford	2–1	Tring Town
1978–79	Watford	3–2*	St Albans City
1979–80	Barnet	1–0	Boreham Wood
1980–81	Watford	5–0	Barnet
1981–82	Watford	3–0	Hertford Town
1982–83	Watford	1–0	Boreham Wood
1983–84	Watford	1–0	Hertford Town
1984–85	Watford	5–2	Barnet
1985–86	Barnet	4–0	Stevenage Borough
1986–87	Bishop's Stortford	2–0	Letchworth Garden City
1987–88	Watford	4–1	Boreham Wood
1988–89	Watford	5–1	Bishop's Stortford
1989–90	Hertford Town	2–0	St Albans City
1990–91	Barnet	5–2	Watford
1991–92	Barnet	4–1	Hemel Hempstead
1992–93	Barnet	4–2	Watford
1993–94	Watford	3–1	Stevenage Borough
1994–95	Watford	4–0	St Albans City
1995–96	Barnet	2–1	Watford
1996–97	Hitchin Town	4–1	Boreham Wood
1997–98	Watford	1–0	Boreham Wood
1998–99	Boreham Wood	3–2	Watford
1999–2000	St Albans City	3–1	Baldock Town
2000–01	Baldock Town	3–0	Ware
2001–02	Boreham Wood	3–2	London Colney
2002–03	Berkhamsted Town	2–0	Cheshunt
2003–04	Watford	4–2	Boreham Wood
2004–05	St Albans City	2–1	Boreham Wood
2005–06	Bishop's Stortford	1–0	Stevenage Borough
2006–07	Barnet	4–2	Hemel Hempstead Town
2007–08	Boreham Wood	5–2	Ware
2008–09	Stevenage Borough	2–1	Cheshunt
2009–10	Bishop's Stortford	4–0	Cheshunt
2010–11	Barnet	2–1	Stevenage
2011–12	Bishop's Stortford	7–2	Oxhey Jets
2012–13	Hemel Hempstead Town	2–0	Potters Bar Town
2013–14	Boreham Wood	1–1 (3–1^)	Bishop's Stortford
2014–15	Hemel Hempstead Town	1–0	Boreham Wood
2015–16	Hitchin Town	2–1	Boreham Wood
2016–17	Hitchin Town	2–1	Bishop's Stortford
2017–18	Boreham Wood	2–1	Royston Town
2018–19	Boreham Wood	1–0	St Albans City
2019–20	Hemel Hempstead Town	Not played and awarded jointly due to Covid-19	St Albans City
2020–21		Not played	
2021–22	Cheshunt	2–0	Hadley
2022–23	Berkhamsted	2–2 (4–2^)	Hitchin Town
2023–24	St Albans City	4–2	Berkhamsted
2024–25	Hemel Hempstead Town	3–1	Potters Bar Town
2025–27	Hitchin Town	0–0 ^	Bishop's Stortford

- * After extra time
- ^ Penalties

== Results by team ==
Club	Wins	Last final won	Runners–up	Last final lost
Barnet	19	2010–11	5	1984–85
Watford (Note: Includes results under their previous names of Watford St Mary's, West Hertfordshire and Watford Rovers)	19	2003–04	8	1998–99
St Albans City (Note: Includes joint win in 2019/20)	17	2023–24	12	2018–19
Hitchin Town	15	2025–26	7	2022–23
Bishop's Stortford	12	2011–12	5	2016–17
Hemel Hempstead Town (Note: Includes results under their previous names of Hemel Hempstead and Apsley and joint win in 2019/20)	8	2024–25	11	2006–07
Boreham Wood	7	2018–19	11	2015–16
Hitchin	7	1909–10	3	1907–08
Ware	5	1953–54	6	2007–08
Leavesden Mental Hospital (Note: Includes results under the name of Leavesden Asylum)	5	1936–37	7	1940–41
Hoddesdon Town (Note: Includes results under the name of Hoddesdon)	3	1889–90	6	1951–52
Letchworth Garden City (Note: Includes results under their previous names of Letchworth Town and Letchworth Athletic)	3	1951–52	3	1986–87
Watford Old Boys	3	1927–28	1	1922–23
Hertford Town	2	1989–90	6	1983–84
Berkhamsted Town	2	2002–03	1	1946–47
St Albans Amateurs	2	1901–02	1	1903–04
Cheshunt	1	2021–22	9	2009–10
Stevenage	1	2008–09	4	2010–11
Baldock Town	1	2000–01	2	1999–2000
Hitchin Blue Cross	1	1922–23	2	1920–21
St Albans	1	1892–93	2	1890–91
Cheshunt (1880–1931)	1	1923–24	1	1925–26
Waltham Glendale	1	1910–11	1	1908–09
Berkhamsted	1	2022–23	0	N/A
Hadley	0	N/A	1	2021–22
West Hertfordshire Association	0	N/A	2	1893–94
Royston Town	0	N/A	1	2017–18
Potters Bar Town	0	N/A	2	2024–25
Oxhey Jets	0	N/A	1	2011–12
London Colney	0	N/A	1	2001–02
Tring Town	0	N/A	1	1977–78
R.E.M.E. (Cupid Green)	0	N/A	1	1945–46
Welwyn	0	N/A	1	1919–20
Hitchin Union Jack	0	N/A	1	1913–14
Harpenden	0	N/A	1	1912–13
Watford Victoria Works	0	N/A	1	1904–05
Stanville	0	N/A	1	1900–01
Aldenham School	0	N/A	1	1897–98
Bushey United	0	N/A	1	1932–33
