= Leavesden =

Leavesden may mean:

- Leavesden, Hertfordshire, an area of Watford, Hertfordshire, England
- Leavesden Aerodrome, a former airfield in Leavesden, Herts.
- Warner Bros. Studios Leavesden, a film and media complex owned by Warner Bros. on the site of the former Rolls-Royce factory at Leavesden Aerodrome
- Leavesden Hospital, on the outskirts of Abbots Langley, England
