= Watford F.C. in European football =

English club in European football

- Club: Watford F.C.
- Seasons played: 1
- Most appearances: Wilf Rostron (6)
- Top scorer: Wilf Rostron (3)
- First entry: 1983–84 UEFA Cup
- Latest entry: 1983–84 UEFA Cup

Watford Football Club is an English football club based in Watford, Hertfordshire. The club was founded in 1881 and has competed in the English football league system since 1920. Their first and so far only season in UEFA-sanctioned cup competition came when they reached the third round of the UEFA Cup in the 1983–84 season.

== History ==
=== 1983–84 UEFA Cup ===
Under Graham Taylor, The Hornets enjoyed their highest ever league finish in the 1982–83 season when they finished second behind Liverpool, securing qualification to the UEFA Cup the following season, alongside compatriots Aston Villa, Nottingham Forest and Tottenham Hotspur; the latter would go on to win the competition. Watford's first opponents were 1. FC Kaiserslautern. Watford lost the first leg 3–1, however a 3–0 win at Vicarage Road saw them safely through to the second round, where they faced Levski Spartak, a Bulgarian side. A 1–1 draw in Hertfordshire was followed up with a 3–1 win after extra time in the Vasil Levski National Stadium, ensuring Watford's progress to the third round.

The draw matched Watford with Czechoslovak club AC Sparta Prague. At home, Watford went 2–0 down in the first half however recovered to 2–2 with goals from Wilf Rostron and Jimmy Gilligan but a late winner from substitute Zdeněk Ščasný sunk the Yellows. A 4–0 away defeat sealed Watford's exit as a 7–2 aggregate loss ended their European campaign.

Season	Competition	Round	Opposition	Score
1983–84	UEFA Cup	First round	(West Germany) 1. FC Kaiserslautern	1–3 (A), 3–0 (H)
1983–84	UEFA Cup	Second round	(Bulgaria) Levski Spartak	1–1 (H), 3–1 (A, aet)
1983–84	UEFA Cup	Third round	(Czechoslovakia) AC Sparta Prague	2–3 (H), 0–4 (A)

== Other competitions ==
=== 1992–93 Anglo-Italian Cup ===
The revival of the Anglo-Italian Cup for the 1992–93 campaign saw Watford return to European cup competition for the first time since 1984, however it would only be a brief return, as Watford finished bottom of their group in the preliminary round having been beaten by Bristol City and drawing with local rivals Luton Town.

Season	Competition	Round	Opposition	Score
1992–93	Anglo-Italian Cup	Preliminary Round	(England) Bristol City	0–1 (A)
1992–93	Anglo-Italian Cup	Preliminary Round	(England) Luton Town	1–1 (H)

=== 1993–94 Anglo-Italian Cup ===
The next season Watford tried again, with another entry. Again, they fell at the preliminary round, as Southend United topped the group, although they did manage to beat their rivals Luton. They did not take part in the Anglo-Italian Cup again, and the tournament itself was scrapped after the 1995–96 tournament because the two leagues could not agree on dates for fixtures.

Season	Competition	Round	Opposition	Score
1993–94	Anglo-Italian Cup	Preliminary Round	(England) Luton Town	2–1 (H)
1993–94	Anglo-Italian Cup	Preliminary Round	(England) Southend United	0–3 (A)

== Overall record ==
Competition	Pld	W	D	L	GF	GA	GD
UEFA Cup	6	2	1	3	10	12	-2
Anglo-Italian Cup	4	1	1	2	3	6	-3
Total	10	3	2	5	13	18	-5
