= Harold Bulling =

English footballer

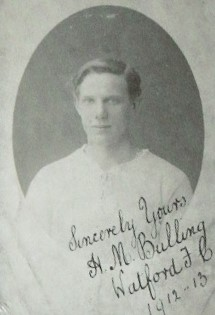

Personal information
- Full name: Harold Montague Bulling
- Date of birth: 29 September 1890
- Place of birth: Martin, England
- Date of death: 11 September 1933 (aged 42)
- Place of death: Nottingham, England
- Height: 5 ft 11 in (1.80 m)
- Position: Full back

Youth career
- West Bridgford Boys

Senior career*
Years	Team	Apps	(Gls)
1910–1911	Heanor Town		
1911–1915	Watford	99	(1)
1919–1925	Nottingham Forest	199	(2)
- Shirebrook
- * Club domestic league appearances and goals

Harold Montague Bulling MM (29 December 1890 – 9 November 1933) was an English footballer who made 199 appearances in the Football League for Nottingham Forest. He also played in the Southern League for Watford.

== Personal life ==
Bulling's brother Cecil also became a footballer. Bulling served as a private in the King's Regiment (Liverpool) during the First World War and won the Military Medal during the course of his service.

== Career statistics ==
Appearances and goals by club, season and competition
Club	Season	League			National cup (Note: Includes FA Cup)		Other		Total	
Club	Season	Division	Apps	Goals	Apps	Goals	Apps	Goals	Apps	Goals
Watford	1911–12	Southern League First Division	9	0	0	0	1 (Note: Appearance(s) in Southern Charity Cup)	0	10	0
Watford	1912–13	Southern League First Division	30	0	3	0	2	0	35	0
Watford	1913–14	Southern League First Division	25	1	0	0	2	0	28	1
Watford	1914–15	Southern League First Division	35	0	0	0	2	0	37	0
Watford	Total		99	1	3	0	7	0	109	1
Nottingham Forest	1919–20	Second Division	20	0	1	0	―		21	0
Nottingham Forest	1920–21	Second Division	39	0	2	0	―		41	0
Nottingham Forest	1921–22	Second Division	42	1	4	0	―		46	1
Nottingham Forest	1922–23	First Division	31	1	4	0	―		35	1
Nottingham Forest	1923–24	First Division	33	0	1	0	―		34	0
Nottingham Forest	1924–25	First Division	21	0	1	0	―		22	0
Nottingham Forest	Total		199	2	13	0	―		212	2
Career total			198	3	16	0	7	0	321	3

== Honours ==
Nottingham Forest

- Football League Second Division: 1921–22
