= Joe McLauchlan =

Scottish footballer (1891–1971)

Personal information
- Full name: Joseph James Simpson McLauchlan
- Date of birth: 5 February 1891
- Place of birth: Edinburgh, Scotland
- Date of death: 6 January 1971 (aged 79)
- Place of death: Leith, Scotland
- Position: Centre forward

Senior career*
Years	Team	Apps	(Gls)
- Linlithgow Rose
1910–1911	Bathgate		
1911–1913	Woolwich Arsenal	16	(1)
1912–1916	Watford	20	(8)
- * Club domestic league appearances and goals

Joseph James McLauchlan (5 February 1891 – 6 January 1971) was a Scottish professional footballer who played as a centre forward in the Football League for Woolwich Arsenal.

== Personal life ==
McLauchlan began his service in during the First World War as a private in the Football Battalion of the Middlesex Regiment. While serving on the Western Front as a private in the Suffolk Regiment in June 1916, he suffered shrapnel wounds to the leg. McLauchlan was discharged from the army in 1917.

== Career statistics ==
Appearances and goals by club, season and competition
Club	Season	League			National Cup		Other		Total	
Club	Season	Division	Apps	Goals	Apps	Goals	Apps	Goals	Apps	Goals
Woolwich Arsenal	1911–12	First Division	3	0	0	0	—		3	0
Woolwich Arsenal	1912–13	First Division	13	1	0	0	—		13	1
Woolwich Arsenal	Total		16	1	0	0	—		16	1
Watford	1913–14	Southern League First Division	14	5	0	0	0	0	14	5
Watford	1914–15	Southern League First Division	6	3	1	0	1 (Note: Appearance in Southern Professional Charity Cup)	0	8	3
Watford	Total		20	8	1	0	1	0	22	8
Career Total			36	9	1	0	1	0	38	9
