= Wally Tattersall =

English footballer

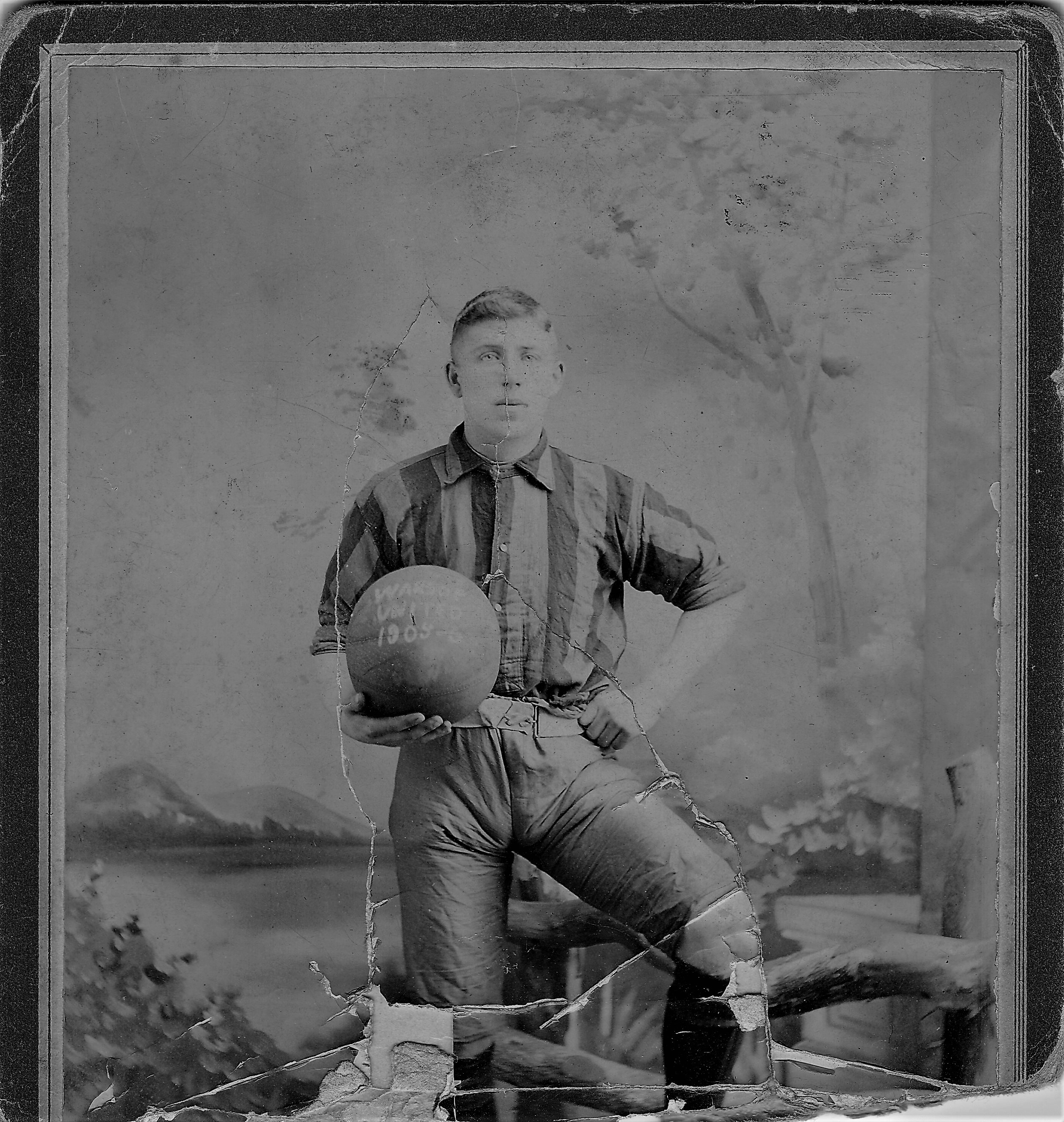
- Tattersall in the kit of Warsop United Football Club for the 1905-06 season.

Personal information
- Full name: Walter Scott Tattersall
- Date of birth: 4 September 1888
- Place of birth: Warsop, England
- Date of death: 30 December 1968 (aged 80)
- Place of death: Warsop, England
- Position: Outside forward

Senior career*
Years	Team	Apps	(Gls)
- Mansfield Wesleyans
- Warsop United
- Moores Athletic (Shirebrook)
1907	Chesterfield Town	3	(0)
- Mansfield Mechanics
1910–1912	Watford	64	(11)
1912–1914	Tottenham Hotspur	44	(3)
- Shirebrook
- Welbeck Colliery
- Sutton Junction
- * Club domestic league appearances and goals

Walter Scott Tattersall (4 September 1888 – 30 December 1968) was an English professional footballer who played for Mansfield Wesleyans, Warsop United, Moores Athletic (Shirebrook), Chesterfield Town, Mansfield Mechanics, Watford, Tottenham Hotspur, Shirebrook, Welbeck Colliery and Sutton Junction.

== Football career ==
Tattersall played for Non-league sides Mansfield Wesleyans, Warsop United and Moores Athletic before joining Chesterfield in 1907 where he appeared in three matches. He went on to play for Mansfield Mechanics and later Watford, for whom he played 75 times in all competitions. Watford sold winger Tattersall and wing half Arthur Grimsdell to Tottenham Hotspur in 1912, for a combined fee of £500. He scored five goals in 47 matches in all competitions for the Lilywhites. After leaving White Hart Lane, Tattersall had spells at Shirebrook, Welbeck Colliery and finally Sutton Junction.

He died in his hometown of Warsop, Nottinghamshire, aged 80.
