= Charlie White (footballer) =

English footballer

Charles William White (13 January 1889 – 23 July 1925) was an English association footballer who played as an inside forward for Watford.

Born in Chesham, White played for Chesham Generals and Chesham Town, and represented the Berkshire and Buckinghamshire county football teams. White joined Watford as a professional in 1909. During his first season, he played four games alongside his older brother Tommy. He played for Watford in the Southern Football League and later the Football League, making 372 competitive appearances and scoring 86 goals. At the time of his death, White was still contracted to the club as a professional footballer.
