= Thomas Ashbridge =

English footballer

Personal information
- Full name: Thomas Edwin Ashbridge
- Date of birth: 1890
- Place of birth: Maryport, England
- Date of death: 1964 (aged 73–74)
- Place of death: Newcastle upon Tyne, England
- Position: Centre forward

Senior career*
Years	Team	Apps	(Gls)
- Wallsend
1913–1914	Watford	21	(9)
1914–1915	Sheffield United		
- * Club domestic league appearances and goals

Thomas Edwin Ashbridge (1890–1964) was an English association footballer. He played as an inside forward for Wallsend, Watford and Sheffield United. During his sole season at Watford, he finished as the club's top scorer with 14 goals in all competitions. This tally included 5 goals in a 10–0 FA Cup win over Bournemouth F.C. on 29 November 1913, which remains the Watford record for the most goals scored by one player in the competition.

Due to financial constraints, Watford sold Ashbridge to Sheffield United for £350, with his team-mate Harry Pantling making a similar move. However, Ashbridge was not able to establish himself in United's team. He left at the end of the 1914–15 season, coinciding with the suspension of competitive football due to the First World War.
