= Cassio Road =

Sports ground in Watford, England

- West Herts Sports Ground
- Location: 8 Park Avenue, Watford, Hertfordshire, England
- Coordinates: 51.6563°N 0.4052°W
- Record attendance: 13,000
- Surface: Grass

Tenants
- Watford (1898–1922); West Herts (2004–present)

Website
- West Herts Sports club

Cassio Road, also known as the West Herts Sport Ground, is a multi use venue and sports ground in Watford, England. It was the home ground of Watford Football Club from 1898 to 1922 and has been the home ground of West Herts Football Club since 2004.

== History ==
In the early twentieth century, Cassio Road was used for athletics, cricket and football. By 1920 spectator facilities included a pavilion and covered standing areas on the western touchline, and a covered terrace behind the northern end of the pitch. When football was played at the ground, duckboards were used on the two sides left open for cricket.

Watford were elected to the Football League in 1920, and the first League match at Cassio Road was a 2–0 defeat by QPR on 4 September 1920 watched by 10,466 spectators. The ground's highest League attendance was 13,000 for a local derby with Luton Town on 25 March 1921.

In 1922 Watford moved to the Vicarage Road ground. The last League game at Cassio Road was played on 29 April 1922, with Watford beating Gillingham 1–0 in front of 5,000 spectators. The ground remained open as a sports venue.
