= Leavesden Hospital =

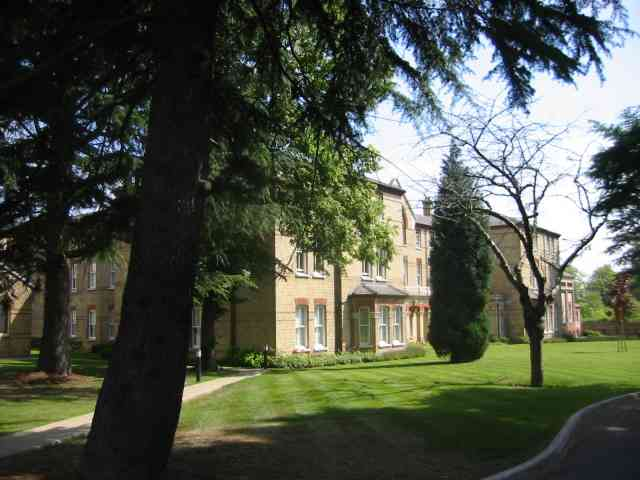
- The front face of the hospital

- Shown in Hertfordshire

Geography
- Location: Leavesden, Hertfordshire, England
- Coordinates: 51°42′12″N 0°24′25″W

Organisation
- Care system: National Health Service
- Type: Mental health

History
- Founded: 1870
- Closed: 1997

Leavesden Mental Hospital was a mental health facility at Leavesden on the outskirts of Abbots Langley in Hertfordshire.

== History ==
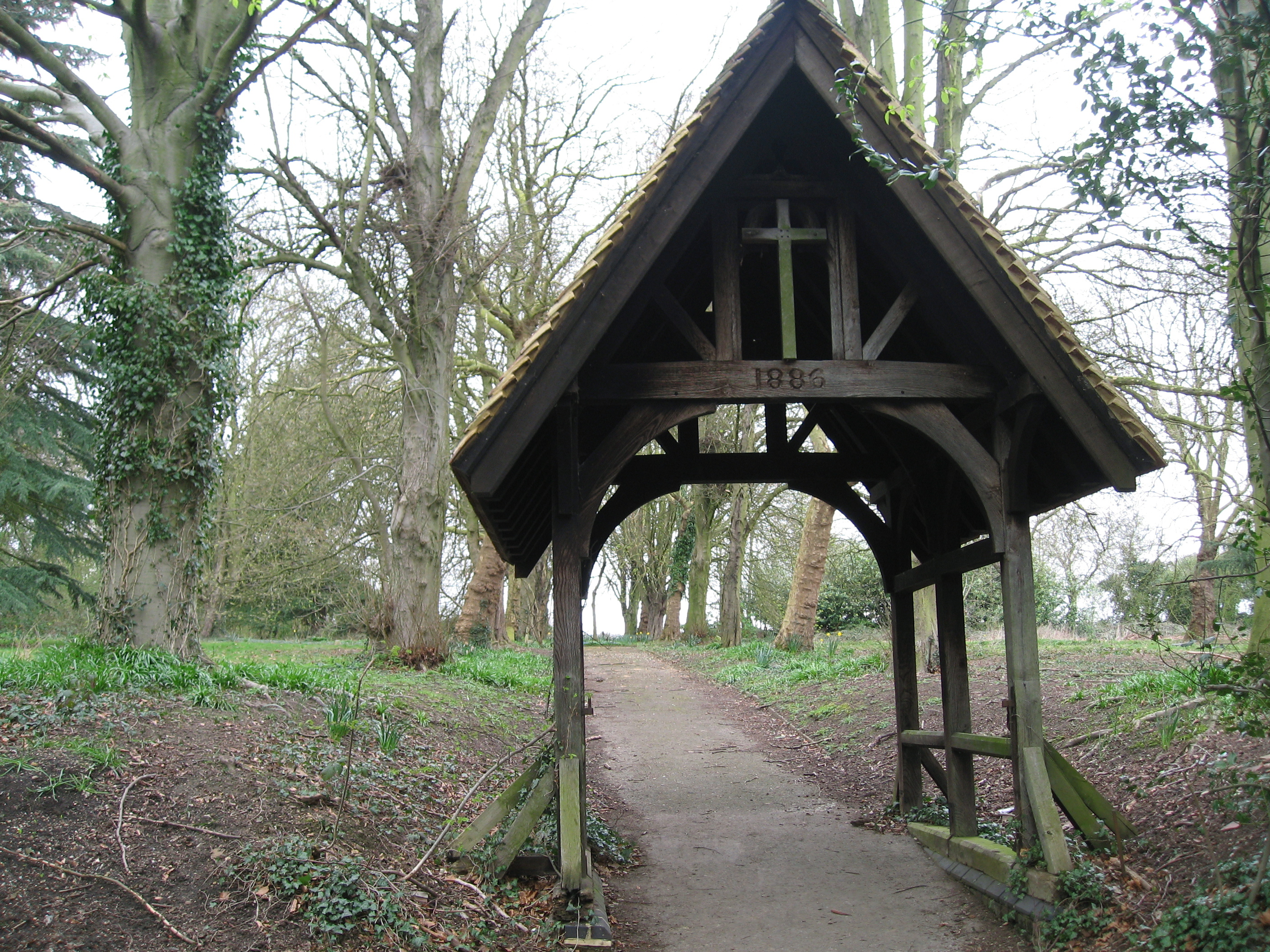
East Lane Cemetery

The facility was commissioned by the Metropolitan Asylums Board and designed by John Giles. It opened as the Metropolitan Asylum for Chronic Imbeciles in 1870. At the same time the St Pancras Union Workhouse established an Industrial School across the road. Both institutions were initially under the chairmanship of William Henry Wyatt. In the 1880s two cemeteries were built on East Lane for patients who had died in the hospital; one remains accessible, but the other has been left to become wooded. A nurses' home was added to the asylum in 1904.

The Jack the Ripper suspect Aaron Kosminski was admitted to Leavesden Asylum on 19 April 1894. Case notes indicate that Kosminski had been ill since at least 1885. His insanity took the form of auditory hallucinations, a paranoid fear of being fed by other people that drove him to pick up and eat food dropped as litter, and a refusal to wash or bathe.

The asylum was renamed the Leavesden Mental Hospital in 1920. London County Council took administrative control of the facility in 1930 and the former St Pancras Industrial School was taken over as an annexe for chronic cases in 1931. It became Leavesden Hospital in 1937.

After the introduction of Care in the Community in the 1980s the hospital reduced in size and closed in 1997. The hospital has since been converted into a private housing estate, Leavesden Court. The development consists mainly of residential apartments, with the charity "Demand" (Design and manufacture for Disability) operating from the building previously used as the on-site chapel.

== Sources ==
- Begg, Paul (2003). Jack the Ripper: The Definitive History. London: Pearson Education. ISBN 0-582-50631-X.
