= Watford Observer =

Weekly local newspaper serving Watford, Hertfordshire, England

- Front page of the Watford Observer on 9 December 2016
- Type: Weekly newspaper
- Owner: Newsquest
- Editor: Simon Murfitt
- Founded: 1863
- Language: English
- Headquarters: Observer House, Watford Business Park
- Circulation: 3,894 (as of 2023)
- Website: watfordobserver.co.uk

The Watford Observer is a weekly local newspaper, published by Newsquest. It serves the town of Watford in southwest Hertfordshire, as well as the surrounding area. The paper covers local news, politics and sport, including the town's largest football club Watford FC.

== History ==
The Watford Observer and General Advertiser for Watford, Bushey and Rickmansworth was first published on 24 January 1863 by Samuel Alexander Peacock, the son of John Peackock, a local bookbinder. In the early years of the 20th century it took over a number of other local titles including The Watford Leader and West Herts News was renamed The West Herts and Watford Observer. Its circulation covered Watford, Bushey, Rickmansworth, Harrow, St Albans, Tring and Chesham.
