= 1919–20 Watford F.C. season =

English football team season

Watford
1919–20 season
- Manager: Harry Kent
- Stadium: Cassio Road
- Southern League First Division: 2nd
- FA Cup: Sixth qualifying round (eliminated by Southend United)
- Top goalscorer: League: George Edmonds (19); All: George Edmonds (19)
- Highest home attendance: 10,000 (vs Luton Town, 2 April 1920)
- Lowest home attendance: 3,000 (vs Newport County, 24 March 1920)
Home colours

Watford Football Club is an association football team from the county of Hertfordshire, England. The 1919–20 season was their twentieth season of league football, and their first since 1914–15 due to the outbreak of the First World War. It was also their final season in the Southern League, having originally joined it as West Hertfordshire for the 1896–97 season, prior to a merging with another club and renaming in 1898. Having started the season as reigning champions, Watford finished the season as runners up of the Southern League First Division on goal average. They won 26 and drew 6 of their 42 league matches, compared to eventual champions Portsmouth's record of 23 wins and 12 draws. Watford's only other competitive fixture was in the FA Cup, where they were eliminated in the 6th Qualifying round by fellow Southern League side Southend United. The club's manager was Harry Kent, and its top scorer was George Edmonds, with 19 goals from 37 appearances.
