= Watford F.C. =

Association football club in England

Watford
- Full name: Watford Football Club
- Nicknames: The Hornets; Yellow Army; The 'Orns; The Golden Boys
- Founded: 1881; 145 years ago
- Ground: Vicarage Road
- Capacity: 22,200
- Owner: Gino Pozzo
- Chairman: Scott Duxbury
- Head coach: Vacant
- League: EFL Championship
- 2025–26: EFL Championship, 16th of 24
- Website: watfordfc.com
Home colours	Away colours	Third colours

Watford Football Club is a professional football club based in Watford, Hertfordshire, England. The club competes in the EFL Championship, the second tier of English football. The team played at several grounds in their early history, including what is now West Herts Sports Club, before moving to Vicarage Road in 1922. They have a long-standing rivalry with nearby club Luton Town.

During Graham Taylor's tenure as manager at the club between 1977 and 1987, Watford rose from the fourth tier to the first. The team finished second in the First Division in 1982–83, competed in the UEFA Cup in 1983–84, and reached the 1984 FA Cup final. Watford declined between 1987 and 1997, before Taylor returned as manager, leading the team to successive promotions from the renamed Second Division (Note: The Third Division was renamed the Second Division upon the inception of the Premier League in 1992–93.) to the Premier League for one season in 1999–2000.

The club played again in the highest tier in 2006–07 under Aidy Boothroyd's management, and then again from 2015 to 2020, reaching the 2019 FA Cup final, their second FA Cup final, but losing to a record-equalling 6–0 score line. In April 2021, Watford were promoted back into the Premier League having spent just one season in the Championship, but were relegated back to the Championship in May 2022.

== History ==
=== Early years ===
The origins of the club can be traced back to 1898 when Watford Rovers were formed by Henry Grover, who went on to play for the club as a full back. Rovers, originally composed entirely of amateur players, held home games at several locations in the town of Watford. The team first competed in the FA Cup in the 1886–87 season, and in 1889 Watford won the County Cup for the first time. The team became the football section of "West Hertfordshire Club and Ground" in 1891, and consequently moved to a ground on Cassio Road. In 1893 Watford Rovers changed their name to "West Herts" and in 1896 they joined the Southern Football League. West Herts' fortunes slumped at the start of the 1897–98 season and attendances were less than 200. They took the bold step of turning professional and their fortunes revived. Watford St. Mary's were runners up in the Hertfordshire Senior Cup of 1894–95 and attracted crowds of 400 to 500 even when West Herts were at home. The two clubs talked of an amalgamation, which ultimately occurred on 15 April 1898. This was reported by the Watford Observer of 7 May 1898. It was agreed that the two clubs should complete their remaining fixtures for the season. The new club was named Watford Football Club.

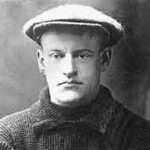
Long-serving Skilly Williams (1890–1959) was Watford's first choice goalkeeper between 1914 and 1926.

Following relegation to the Southern League Second Division in 1903, Watford appointed its first manager – former England international and First Division top scorer John Goodall. He led Watford to promotion, and kept the team in the division until his departure in 1910. Despite financial constraints, Watford won the Southern League title in the 1914–15 season under his successor, Harry Kent. Watford held the title for five years following the suspension of the Southern League during the First World War – after finishing the 1919–20 season runners-up on goal average, the club resigned from the Southern League to join the new Football League Third Division.

From 1921–22, the third tier of The Football League consisted of two parallel sections of 22 clubs, fighting both for promotion to the Second Division and also battling to hold on to their league status. There was a re-election system in place which meant the bottom two teams in each of the two divisions had to apply for re-election to the league. Watford finished outside the top six league positions in every season between 1922 and 1934. Following Kent's departure in 1926, they finished 21st out of 22 clubs in 1926–27, but were unanimously re-elected to the league after a ballot of clubs in the top two divisions of The Football League. By contrast, under Neil McBain and subsequently Bill Findlay, the team recorded five consecutive top six finishes between 1934–35 and 1938–39, and won the Football League Third Division South Cup in 1937. The Football League was suspended in 1939 due to the Second World War.

=== Post-war era ===
Chart of yearly table positions of Watford in the English football league.

Football resumed in 1946, with Watford still in the Third Division South. A 23rd-placed finish in 1950–51 meant that the club had to apply for re-election to the league once more, but again teams in the First and Second Divisions unanimously voted for Watford to stay in the league. McBain returned in 1956, and the team remained in the division until 1958; the league was restructured into four national divisions for the 1958–59 season, and Watford were placed in the Fourth Division. Ron Burgess replaced McBain during that season, and in the following campaign Burgess presided over Watford's first Football League promotion. This team included Fourth Division top scorer Cliff Holton, who scored a club record 42 league goals in the season. Holton was sold to Northampton the following year after another 34 goals, to the anger of supporters. Burgess was succeeded by Bill McGarry, who bought new players such as Charlie Livesey and Ron Saunders, and in his only season at the club led the club to what was at the time its highest ever league position: third in the Third Division. Eighteen-year-old Northern Irish goalkeeper Pat Jennings also featured under McGarry, and made his international debut despite being a Third Division player.

McGarry joined Ipswich in 1964, and was replaced by player-manager Ken Furphy, from Workington Furphy rebuilt the team around players such as Keith Eddy and Dennis Bond, but after holding Liverpool to a draw in the FA Cup and narrowly failing to win promotion in 1966–67, Bond was sold to Tottenham Hotspur for £30,000, Watford's record transfer receipt at the time. Furphy's rebuilding came to fruition in 1969 with the signing of Barry Endean, whose arrival marked the start of an unbeaten run after Christmas. Watford secured the Third Division title in April, at home to Plymouth Argyle. A year later Watford reached the FA Cup semi-final for the first time, defeating First Division teams Stoke City and Liverpool along the way. Hampered by a lack of funds, however, Furphy eventually joined Blackburn Rovers, to be succeeded by George Kirby. Forced to sell players to survive, Watford fell back into the Third Division in 1972. The team continued to struggle in the third tier, and despite a managerial change, Watford were relegated again in 1975.

Watford's starting line-up for the 1984 FA Cup Final. Paul Atkinson came on as a substitute; Graham Taylor managed the team.

=== Elton John era ===
Musician Elton John, a lifelong Watford supporter, became club chairman in 1976. The singer declared an ambition to take the team into the First Division, and dismissed Kirby's successor Mike Keen in April 1977. When Graham Taylor was named as Keen's successor, the club was still in the Fourth Division. Taylor achieved promotion in his first season; Watford won the Fourth Division title, recording the most wins, fewest defeats, most goals scored and fewest goals conceded of any side in the division. Promotion to the Second Division followed in 1978–79, and Ross Jenkins finished the season as the league's top scorer with 29 goals. Watford consolidated with 18th and ninth-placed finishes over the following two seasons, and secured promotion to the First Division for the first time in 1981–82, finishing second behind rivals Luton Town.

Watford started the 1982–83 season with four league wins from the opening five fixtures; in the space of seven years, the club had climbed from bottom place in the lowest division of The Football League to top position in the highest division. Watford were unable to maintain a title challenge, but eventually finished the season second behind Liverpool, which ensured UEFA Cup qualification for the following season. Luther Blissett finished the season as the First Division top scorer, before signing for Italian Serie A side Milan for £1 million at the end of the season. An FA Cup Final appearance followed in the 1984 fixture, where they lost to Everton. After guiding Watford to a ninth-place finish in 1986–87, Taylor left the club to manage Aston Villa.

Following Taylor's departure, Wimbledon manager Dave Bassett was appointed as his replacement, and England winger John Barnes was sold to Liverpool. After 4 wins from his opening 23 league fixtures, Bassett was sacked in January 1988. Watford were bottom of the First Division at the time of his departure, and Steve Harrison could not prevent relegation at the end of the season. In 1988–89, Harrison's Watford failed to return to the First Division, after defeat in the Second Division play-offs. The under-18 team won the FA Youth Cup, beating Manchester City 2–1 after extra time, with future England international David James in goal for the Hornets. Harrison departed in 1990, and over the next few years, the closest Watford came to promotion was a seventh-placed finish in Division One (Note: The second division was renamed Division 1 upon the inception of the Premier League in 1992–93, and rebranded as the Football League Championship in 2004–05.) in the 1994–95 season. However, in the following season – Glenn Roeder's third as manager – Watford struggled. Despite the return of Graham Taylor as caretaker manager in February 1996, the club was relegated to Division Two.

Following the relegation, Taylor became director of football, with former Watford midfielder Kenny Jackett as manager. After a mid-table finish in Division Two in 1996–97, Jackett was demoted to the position of assistant manager. Taylor returned as manager, and won the Second Division title in 1997–98 – Watford's second league title under his management. A second successive promotion followed in 1998–99 after a 2–0 play-off final victory over Bolton Wanderers. Watford's first Premiership season started with an early victory over Liverpool, but Watford's form soon faded, and the club were relegated. Graham Taylor retired at the end of the 2000–01 season, and was replaced by Gianluca Vialli. Wage bills at the club rose by £4 million during Vialli's tenure, and the club finished 14th in the division in 2001–02. Vialli was sacked at the end of the season, following a dispute with the club's board over the wage bill. He was replaced by Ray Lewington, who had joined the club the previous summer as Vialli's reserve team manager.

=== Financial struggles ===
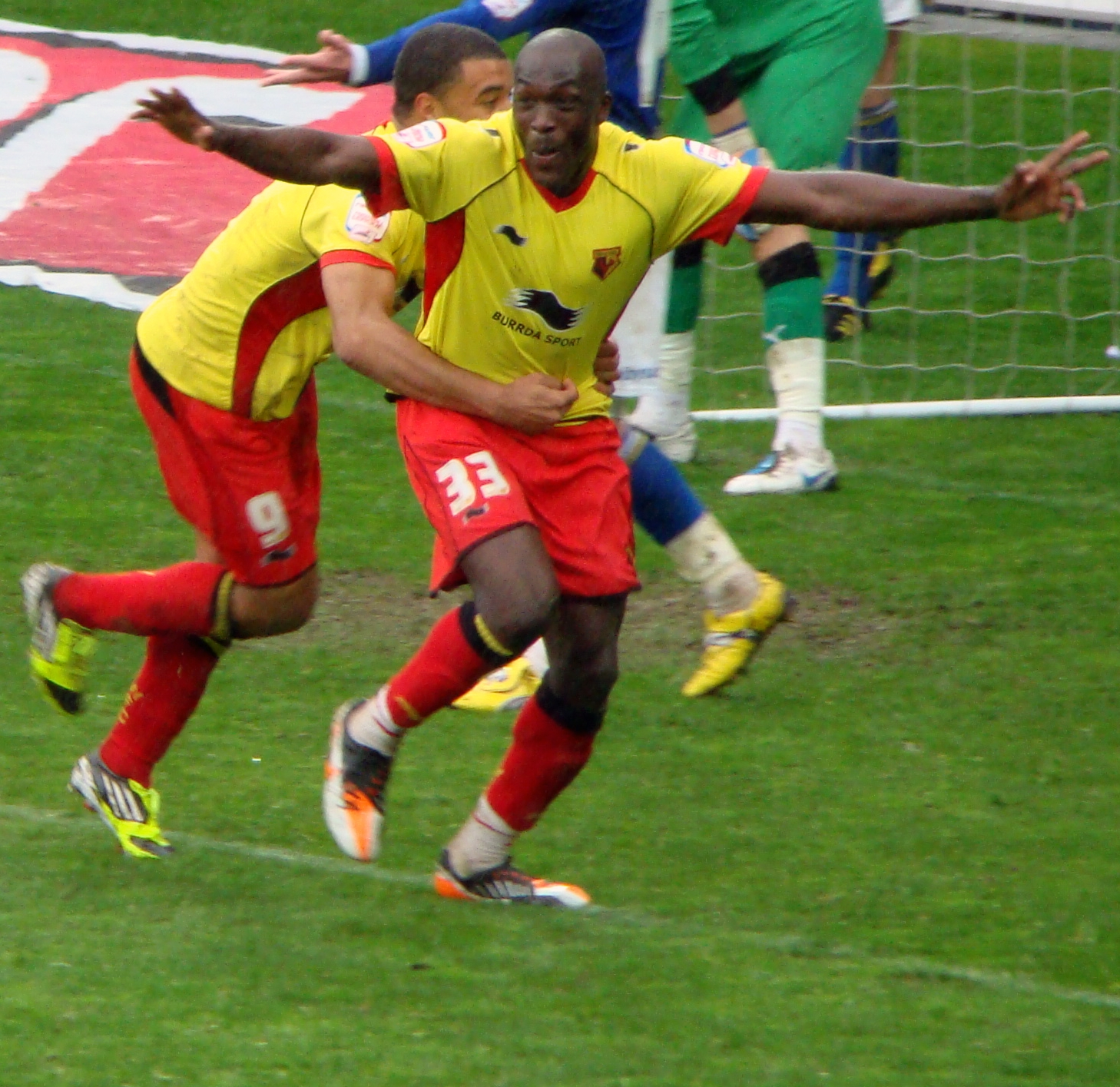
Nyron Nosworthy celebrates a goal against Cardiff City in the 2011–12 season.

Watford's weak financial position was exposed in 2002–03, following the collapse of ITV Digital. The club was facing administration, but an agreement by players and staff to a 12% wage deferral helped the club's cash flow, and a run to the FA Cup semi-final generated vital revenue. Financial constraints saw a large number of players released that summer. After consolidating in 2003–04, the following season started well, with the club in the upper half of the Championship at the end of September. Poor form, however, saw the club drop towards the relegation zone. Despite reaching the semi-final of the League Cup, Watford's league form did not improve, and Lewington was sacked in March 2005. His successor, Aidy Boothroyd, led the club to Championship survival.

=== Return to the Premier League ===
Watford finished third in the league in Boothroyd's first full season, and defeated Leeds United 3–0 in the play-off final to gain promotion to the Premier League. But the team did not record a Premier League win until November, and Ashley Young was sold to Aston Villa for a club record fee of £9.65 million in January 2007. Watford finished bottom after only winning five league games, but did reach the semi-finals of the FA Cup. Boothroyd continued as manager, and spent heavily on players, including a then-club record £3.25 million for Nathan Ellington. Watford led the Championship by several points early in 2007–08, but only finished sixth; Boothroyd's team were defeated 6–1 on aggregate by Hull City in the play-off semi-finals. Boothroyd left the club by mutual consent three months into the 2008–09 season, with Watford 21st in the Championship table.

Under Boothroyd's successor, Brendan Rodgers, Watford finished 13th. Rodgers left to manage Reading at the end of the season; Malky Mackay, who had previously served as caretaker manager, was his replacement. Amid the departures of several key players during Mackay's tenure, including Tommy Smith and Jay DeMerit, and the club coming close to administration, Watford finished 16th in 2009–10 and 14th the following season. Mackay left to manage Cardiff City in June 2011 and was replaced by Sean Dyche. Despite presiding over Watford's highest league position in four years by finishing 11th, Dyche was dismissed as Watford manager in July 2012.

=== Pozzo family era ===
In June 2012, Laurence Bassini completed the sale of the club to the Pozzo family (Gino Pozzo and his father). Following Dyche's sacking, the new owners brought in former Italy international Gianfranco Zola to take charge. In the 2012–13 season Watford finished third in the Championship, and reached the play-off final where they were defeated in the final by Crystal Palace 1–0 via an extra-time penalty by Kevin Phillips. The following season, Giuseppe Sannino replaced Zola as their new manager and the team finished the season in 13th place. Sannino resigned at the start of the 2014–15 season and was replaced by Óscar García, who left shortly afterwards for "health reasons".

Billy McKinlay replaced him but, despite winning four points out of a possible six under his stewardship, after just eight days he too was replaced, by Slaviša Jokanović. With Jokanović managing the team, Watford finished second in the Championship, after being edged out on the final day by champions AFC Bournemouth, and were promoted.

Watford did not renew Jokanović's contract and he was replaced by the Spaniard Quique Sánchez Flores ahead of the 2015–16 season. Under Sánchez Flores Watford finished 13th in the Premier League, and reached the semi-finals of the FA Cup, ending Arsenal's bid to win the competition for three successive times, but were beaten 2–1 by Crystal Palace. Near the end of the season, in May 2016, Sánchez Flores and the club enacted a break clause in his contract, and he was replaced by Italian coach Walter Mazzarri, who signed a three-year contract. At the end of the next season, in May 2017, Watford finished 17th and Mazzari resigned, replaced by Marco Silva. The new coach was sacked after approximately six months, following interest from Everton, in January 2018, and the club hired Javi Gracia. In April 2019, Watford came back from 2–0 down to beat Wolverhampton Wanderers to reach the FA Cup final for the second time in their history, with Gerard Deulofeu scoring twice and Troy Deeney scoring a penalty in the 94th minute to take it to extra time. They met Manchester City in the final and were defeated 6–0, a joint record margin of victory for an FA Cup final. In the league, Watford finished 11th, with 50 points, both club records for the Premier League era.

After four games in charge in the 2019–20 season, Gracia was sacked due to poor league form, being replaced 30 minutes later by former manager Quique Sánchez Flores. He survived only until 1 December 2019, after getting only one win since his appointment in September. A caretaker manager was appointed for one game before Nigel Pearson was appointed. Watford ended Liverpool's unbeaten run of 44 top-flight games in February 2020, but Pearson was sacked two games before the end of the season, and the club were relegated, finishing 19th out of 20. Watford finished the 2020–21 Championship season in second place, gaining immediate promotion back to the Premier League, but again finished the following season 19th and were relegated back to the Championship. On June 4, 2024, the Pozzo family decided to put up 10% of the club for sale under fan ownership in order to generate cash for the club.

From the end of the 2020–21 season to November 2026, Watford employed 12 head coaches, including Alessio Dionisi, sacked after 18 games in charge on 22 November 2026. His successor will be the 25th since the Pozzo family took ownership in 2012.

== Club identity ==
Watford's colours were blue and white from 1927 until 1959.

Watford's kit has changed considerably over the course of the club's history. The club's kit featured various combinations of red, green and yellow stripes, before a new colour scheme of black and white was adopted for the 1909–10 season. These colours were retained until the 1920s, when the club introduced an all-blue shirt. After a change of colours to gold shirts and black shorts for 1959–60, the team's nickname was changed to The Hornets, after a popular vote via the supporters club. These colours remained until 1976, when Watford's kits started featuring red, and the gold was changed to yellow. That colour scheme has continued into the 21st century.

The club changed to a gold and black colour scheme in 1959–60.

Watford's initial nickname was The Brewers, in reference to the Benskins Brewery, which owned the freehold of Vicarage Road. This nickname did not prove particularly popular, and upon the adoption of a blue-and-white colour scheme in the 1920s, the club became predominantly known as The Blues. When Watford changed kit colours in 1959, supporters chose The Hornets as the team's new nickname, and the club later introduced a crest depicting a hornet. In 1974 the design was changed to depict Harry the Hornet, the club's mascot. The club's nickname remains, but in 1978 the hornet crest was replaced by a depiction of a hart – a male red fallow deer– on a yellow and black background. A hart represents the town's location in the county of Hertfordshire. Until Barnet (Note: Although now located in Greater London, Barnet continue to participate in the Herts Senior Cup, organised by the Hertfordshire Football Association.) and, later, Stevenage joined the Football League, Watford were Hertfordshire's only league club. Other nicknames have since been adopted, including Yellow Army and The 'Orns.

Until April 2019, when Watford played at Vicarage Road their players traditionally entered the pitch at the start of the game to the Z-Cars theme tune. However, in mid-April 2019 the team changed their entrance song to Elton John's "I'm Still Standing". The club returned to Z Cars as the theme to welcome players to the pitch in August 2019 at the start of the 2019–20 Premier League season, following fan pressure and petitions.

=== Kit manufacturers and shirt sponsors ===
Period	Kit manufacturer	Shirt sponsor
1974–1982	Umbro	—
1982–1985	Umbro	Iveco
1985–1988	Umbro	Solvite
1988–1989	Umbro	Eagle Express
1989–1991	Umbro	Herald & Post
1991–1993	Bukta	RCI
1993–1995	Hummel	Blaupunkt
1995–1996	Mizuno	Blaupunkt
1996–1998	Mizuno	CTX
1998–1999	Le Coq Sportif	CTX
1999–2001	Le Coq Sportif	Phones 4u
2001–2003	Kit@	Toshiba
2003–2005	Kit@	TotalEnergies
2005–2007	Diadora	Loans.co.uk
2007–2009	Diadora	Beko
2009–2010	Joma	Evolution HDTV
2010–2012	Burrda	Burrda
2012–2013	Puma	Football Manager
2013–2016	Puma	138.com
2016–2017	Dryworld	138.com
2017–2019	Adidas	FxPro
2019–2020	Adidas	Sportsbet.io
2020–2021	Kelme	Sportsbet.io
2021–2023	Kelme	Stake.com
2023–2026	Kelme	MrQ
2026–	Kelme	BOXT

== Stadium ==
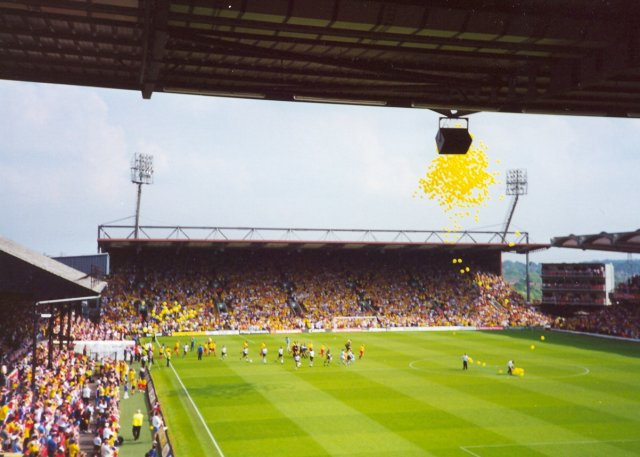
Watford fans at Vicarage Road, on the last day of the 1999–2000 season

Watford Rovers played at several grounds in the late 19th century, including Cassiobury Park, Vicarage Meadow and Market Street, Watford. In 1890, the team moved to a site on Cassio Road, and remained there for 32 years, before moving to Watford's current stadium at nearby Vicarage Road in 1922. The new stadium was initially owned by Benskins Brewery; the club rented the ground until 2001, when it purchased the freehold outright. However, the club's financial situation worsened following the purchase, and in 2002 Watford sold the ground for £6 million in a deal which entitled Watford to buy the stadium back for £7 million in future. Watford took up this option in 2004 using a campaign backed and funded by the fans called "Lets buy back the Vic".

Vicarage Road is a four-sided ground with a capacity of 21,577. The East Stand, part of which was constructed in 1922, was closed to the general public in 2008 for health and safety reasons, although it still hosted the dressing rooms and the matchday press area. In November 2013, the East Stand was demolished and in its place a new steel-framed, 3,500-seater stand was constructed. The stand opened fully on Boxing Day 2014 and was named The Elton John Stand after the club's longstanding chairman. The Graham Taylor Stand (previously the Rous Stand), built in 1986, has two tiers and runs the length of the pitch, with the upper section containing the club's corporate hospitality. At either end of the pitch, The Vicarage Road Stand is split between the club's family section and away supporters, while the Rookery Stand is for home supporters only. Both stands were built in the 1990s, financed by proceeds from player sales. In the summer of 2015, The Elton John Stand was revamped in order to accommodate an extra 700 seats. This number was revised a day later to around 1,000 extra seats following the announcement of an expansion in the north-east corner.

Between 1997 and early 2013, Watford shared Vicarage Road with rugby union side Saracens. The stadium has hosted matches for the England under-21s, and senior international football between overseas teams. Elton John has also used Vicarage Road as a venue for concerts: He first played at the stadium in 1974 and returned in 2005 and 2010 to stage fundraising concerts for the club. Former events include horse and carriage shows and greyhound racing.

The Watford Training Ground is located on the University College London Union (UCLU) Shenley Sports grounds in St Albans, Hertfordshire.

== Luton rivalry ==
Watford fans maintain a rivalry with those of Luton Town. The two sides met regularly in the Southern League between 1900 and 1920, and continued to do so in The Football League until 1937, when Luton gained promotion from Division Three South. Luton remained in a higher division than Watford until 1963.

Throughout the 1960s and 1970s, Watford and Luton met sporadically. Despite this, the rivalry grew in significance, particularly following an ill-tempered match between the sides in 1969, in which three players were sent off. Both sides won promotion to the First Division in the 1981–82 season, with Luton taking the championship ahead of Watford. They were also relegated together from the new Division 1 (now the Premier League) in 1995–96, with Watford finishing 23rd ahead of bottom-placed Luton. Watford's promotion from Division 2 in 1997–98 meant that the two sides did not meet again until Luton won promotion to the Championship for the 2005–06 season. The only meeting between those seasons – a League Cup tie in the 2002–03 season – was marred by violence inside Vicarage Road.

On 2 January 2006, Watford won 2–1 at Kenilworth Road in the Championship, followed by a 1–1 draw between the sides, on 9 April 2006, a point that secured Watford's place in the 2006 Championship play-offs, from which they eventually won promotion to the Premier League for the second time, beating Leeds United 3–0 at the Millennium Stadium in Cardiff.

Over a fourteen-season span, Watford played in a higher division than Luton (between the 2006–07 and the 2019–20 seasons), with Luton dropping out of the football league altogether for six seasons between 2009–10 and 2014–15.

The rivalry between the two clubs resumed in the 2020–21 season. On 26 September 2020, Watford won the first league match of the season between the two clubs, 1–0, at Vicarage Road. On 17 April 2021, in the reverse fixture at Kenilworth Road, Luton won the match 1–0. With Watford's promotion back to the Premier League for season 2021–22, the rivalry did not commence that year; although it resumed for the 2022–23 season after Watford's immediate relegation from the Premier League, whilst Luton remained in the Championship. Luton were promoted to the 2023–24 Premier League, but were relegated back to the Championship after one season.

The head-to-head record between the clubs, in competitions which currently exist, stands at Luton 55 wins, Watford 38 wins, with 29 draws. (Note: This refers to games played in The Football League, FA Cup and Football League Cup. Soccerbase covers matches played in these competitions since Watford joined the Football League in 1920 – the record in these matches is Luton 35 wins, Watford 27 wins, 22 draws. The teams met five times in the FA Cup prior to the 1920–21 season: Luton won 4 games, and the other was drawn.)

== In the community ==
Watford's Community Sports and Education Trust supports the club's community engagement causes. Watford and its players have participated in festivals and civic observances as part of the club's community activities. The club's Christmas community outreach activities have included visits to local hospitals during the holiday period. The club has participated in one of the longest-running Hanukkah events in English football with the Jewish Hornets supporters' group. Additionally, the club has observed Remembrance Day, with players and staff wearing poppies and holding a minute's silence at fixtures in support of the Royal British Legion.

== Players ==
=== Current squad ===
As of 17 October 2026

Note: Flags indicate national team as defined under FIFA eligibility rules; some limited exceptions apply. Players may hold more than one non-FIFA nationality.

No.	Pos.	Nation	Player
1	GK	ITA	Federico Ravaglia
2	DF	COD	Jeremy Ngakia
3	DF	FRA	Soumaïla Coulibaly (on loan from Strasbourg)
4	DF	CMR	Kévin Keben
5	MF	CYP	Hector Kyprianou
6	DF	ENG	Mattie Pollock (captain)
7	FW	MAR	Othmane Maamma
8	MF	ITA	Edoardo Bove
9	FW	DEN	Luca Kjerrumgaard
10	FW	NED	Myron Boadu
11	FW	IRL	Rocco Vata
14	FW	GER	Kwadwo Baah
15	DF	SEN	Krépin Diatta
16	DF	ENG	Marc Bola

No.	Pos.	Nation	Player
17	FW	ESP	Iker Bravo
18	FW	JAM	Michail Antonio
19	FW	GEO	Nikoloz Chikovani
20	FW	MLI	Mamadou Doumbia
21	FW	AFG	Amin Nabizada
22	MF	ARG	Martín Payero
23	DF	GER	Omar Traoré
24	GK	ENG	Sam Walker
26	GK	AUT	Daniel Bachmann
29	DF	CRO	Branimir Mlačić (on loan from Udinese)
33	DF	ZIM	Jordan Zemura (on loan from Udinese)
39	MF	COD	Edo Kayembe
43	MF	ENG	Jack Grieves
45	FW	COD	Stephy Mavididi (on loan from Leicester City)

=== Out on loan ===
Note: Flags indicate national team as defined under FIFA eligibility rules; some limited exceptions apply. Players may hold more than one non-FIFA nationality.

No.	Pos.	Nation	Player
13	GK	NOR	Egil Selvik (at Brest until 30 June 2027)
18	FW	POR	Vivaldo Semedo (at Alverca until 30 June 2027)
41	GK	ENG	Alfie Marriott (at Chelmsford City until 04 January 2027)

No.	Pos.	Nation	Player
48	FW	ENG	Michael Adu-Poku (at Newport County until 30 June 2027)
—	FW	COL	Jorge Cabezas Hurtado (at Tolima until 30 June 2027)

=== B Team and Academy ===
B Team or academy players to have been given a senior squad number in 2026/27

Note: Flags indicate national team as defined under FIFA eligibility rules; some limited exceptions apply. Players may hold more than one non-FIFA nationality.

No.	Pos.	Nation	Player
51	DF	ENG	Travis Akomeah
53	DF	ENG	James Clarridge
56	DF	ENG	Albert Eames

== Managers ==
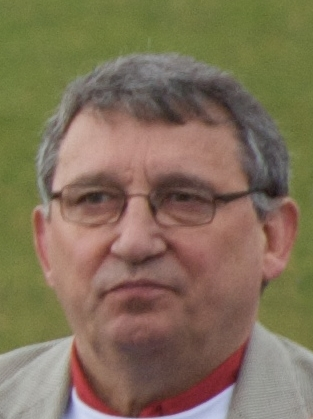
Graham Taylor took Watford from the Fourth Division to the First, between 1977 and 1982.

Watford's team was selected by committee until 1903, when former England international John Goodall was appointed player-manager. The impact was immediate, as Watford secured promotion to the Southern League First Division in 1903–04. Goodall retired as a player in 1907, and left the club in 1910. He was replaced by his former captain, Harry Kent, who become known for his financial management of the club; under Kent, Watford frequently made a profit in the transfer market. Kent led the club to the Southern League title in 1914–15, and missed out on a second title in 1919–20 on goal average, before resigning in 1926. His three immediate successors – Fred Pagnam, Neil McBain and Bill Findlay – all played for Watford before and during the early part of their managerial tenures. None were able to lead the team to promotion from the Third Division South, although Findlay did lead Watford to a Third Division South Cup win in 1937.

Up until Findlay's departure in 1947, Watford had been managed by five managers in 44 years, all of whom played for the team. By contrast, six men managed the club between 1947 and 1956, only two of whom were former Watford players. After a further three years under McBain between 1956 and 1959, Watford's following three managers presided over improved teams. Ron Burgess led Watford to promotion from the Fourth Division in 1959–60. Bill McGarry was only in charge for one full season (1963–64), but Watford recorded a finish of third in the Third Division, the club's highest Football League finish until that point. His successor Ken Furphy matched that achievement in 1966–67, and led Watford to the Third Division title in 1969, before taking the club to its first FA Cup semi-final in 1970. Following Furphy's departure in 1971, Watford entered a period of decline, experiencing relegation under subsequent managers George Kirby and Mike Keen.

Graham Taylor took charge of Watford in 1977. He led the club to promotion to the Third Division in 1978, the Second Division in 1979, and the First Division for the first time in Watford's history in 1982. After a second-placed finish in the First Division in 1983, Watford competed in European competition for the first time in 1983–84, as well as reaching the 1984 FA Cup final. Taylor left the club at the end of 1986–87. Under the six subsequent permanent managers (Dave Bassett, Steve Harrison, Colin Lee, Steve Perryman, Glenn Roeder and Kenny Jackett), Watford slid from 9th in the top tier in 1987, to 13th in the third tier in 1997. Taylor returned as manager for the start of the 1997–98 season. He led the club to consecutive promotions, but could not prevent relegation from the Premier League in 1999–2000. Since Taylor's retirement in 2001, Watford have had twelve managers. Of these, Aidy Boothroyd took Watford back to the Premier League in 2006, but Watford were relegated in 2007, and Boothroyd departed in 2008.

Following Watford's takeover by the Pozzo family, Gianfranco Zola was appointed head coach, replacing former centre back Sean Dyche in July 2012,. Zola took Watford to third position in the Championship in 2012–13 but resigned on 16 December 2013. He was replaced by fellow Italian Beppe Sannino in December 2013. Sannino guided the team to a final league position of 13th.

Despite winning four of the first five league matches of the 2014–15 season, and with Watford sitting in 2nd place, Sannino's position had become the subject of much speculation following rumours of dressing-room unrest and some players taking a dislike to his style of management. Sannino resigned from his position as head coach on 31 August 2014 after just over eight months in charge. His final game in charge was a 4–2 win at home to Huddersfield Town the day before.

Sannino's departure initiated a bizarre sequence of events which led to Watford having three further head coaches in little more than a month. On 2 September, Watford confirmed the appointment of former Brighton & Hove Albion head coach Óscar García as the successor to Sannino. García, however, resigned from his position on 29 September 2014 for health reasons, having been admitted to hospital with chest pains a couple of weeks prior. Billy McKinlay, who had only been appointed first team coach on 26 September 2014, was appointed as his immediate successor on the same day – his first position in management. A week later, McKinlay was released by mutual consent and former Partizan coach Slaviša Jokanović appointed in his place, apparently because the club favoured a head coach with greater experience.

On 4 June 2015, Quique Sánchez Flores was announced as the new head coach as the replacement to Jokanović, who had failed to agree contract terms. Despite going on to lead the newly promoted Watford to a comfortable mid-table position in the Premier League and the semi-final of the FA Cup, it was announced on 13 May 2016 that Sánchez Flores would be leaving the club at the end of the season.

Following Sánchez Flores's departure, Walter Mazzarri was announced as Watford's head coach starting on 1 July 2016. Mazzari's tenure as manager was terminated at the end of the season. On 27 May 2017 Marco Silva was appointed head coach. On 21 January 2018, Javi Gracia was appointed as head coach following Silva's departure. Gracia guided the club to a successful 2018–19 Premier League campaign which saw Watford finish with their highest ever points tally in English Premier League football.

Since around 2019, the club have gained notoriety for an excessive number of managerial sackings and a lack of time given to managers, instead sacking them very quickly after a poor run of form. After a disappointing start to the 2019–20 season, Javi Gracia was dismissed and replaced by previous manager Quique Sánchez Flores. Then Quique Sánchez Flores was dismissed again after a 2–1 loss to Southampton on 1 December. On 6 December 2019, Nigel Pearson agreed to take manager's job, with Craig Shakespeare as his assistant, on a short-term contract to the end of the season. He was sacked on 19 July 2020 with two games to go with Hayden Mullins appointed as interim coach until the end of the season.

In the 2020–21 season, there were two more coaches, beginning with Vladimir Ivic, and followed by Xisco Munoz, who ultimately steered Watford towards promotion to the Premier League. Xisco continued to coach the team for the 2021–22 Premier League campaign until October 2021, and was subsequently followed by Claudio Ranieri from October 2021 to January 2022. Former England manager Roy Hodgson took hold of the reigns from February 2022 until the season's end, where Watford finished in 19th place and were relegated from the Premier League.

Rob Edwards was announced as the new manager for the 2022–23 season, but was released by the club in September 2022 after 11 games in charge. Slaven Bilić was announced as his replacement on an 18-month contract. Bilic was subsequently sacked on 7 March 2023 and replaced by Chris Wilder on a short-term contract until the end of the season, making it the third time in four seasons the club has had three head coaches in one season. On 10 May 2023, French coach Valérien Ismaël was appointed head coach ahead of the 2023–24 Championship season. Following the dismissal of Valérien Ismaël on 9 March 2024, Tom Cleverley was named as interim head coach. On 24 April 2024, Cleverley was given the head coach role on a permanent basis having lost only once in his seven matches in interim charge. In May 2025, he was dismissed, and was succeeded by Paulo Pezzolano, then Javi Gracia, Charlie Daniels (interim), Edward Still and Alessio Dionisi, sacked on 22 November 2026 after 18 games in charge, leaving the club seeking its sixth head coach in 18 months.

== Club officials ==
Position	Name
Head Coach	vacant
Assistant Head Coach	Dan Thomassen
First Team Coach	Adrian Mariappa
Goalkeeping Coach	Sacha Lanci
Head of Physical Performance	Fabio Spighi
First Team Analysts	Andrew Douglas; Lewis Boulter; Luca Vigiani
Group Technical Director	Gian Luca Nani
Sporting Director	Richard Ainsley; Luke Dowling
Academy Director	Richard Johnson
Academy Head of Coaching	Micah Hyde
B Team Coach	Paul Furlong
B Team Assistant Coach	Vacant
Under-18s Coach	Vacant
Under-18s Assistant Coach	Lloyd Doyley
Head of Academy Goalkeeping	Gary Phillips

== Honours ==
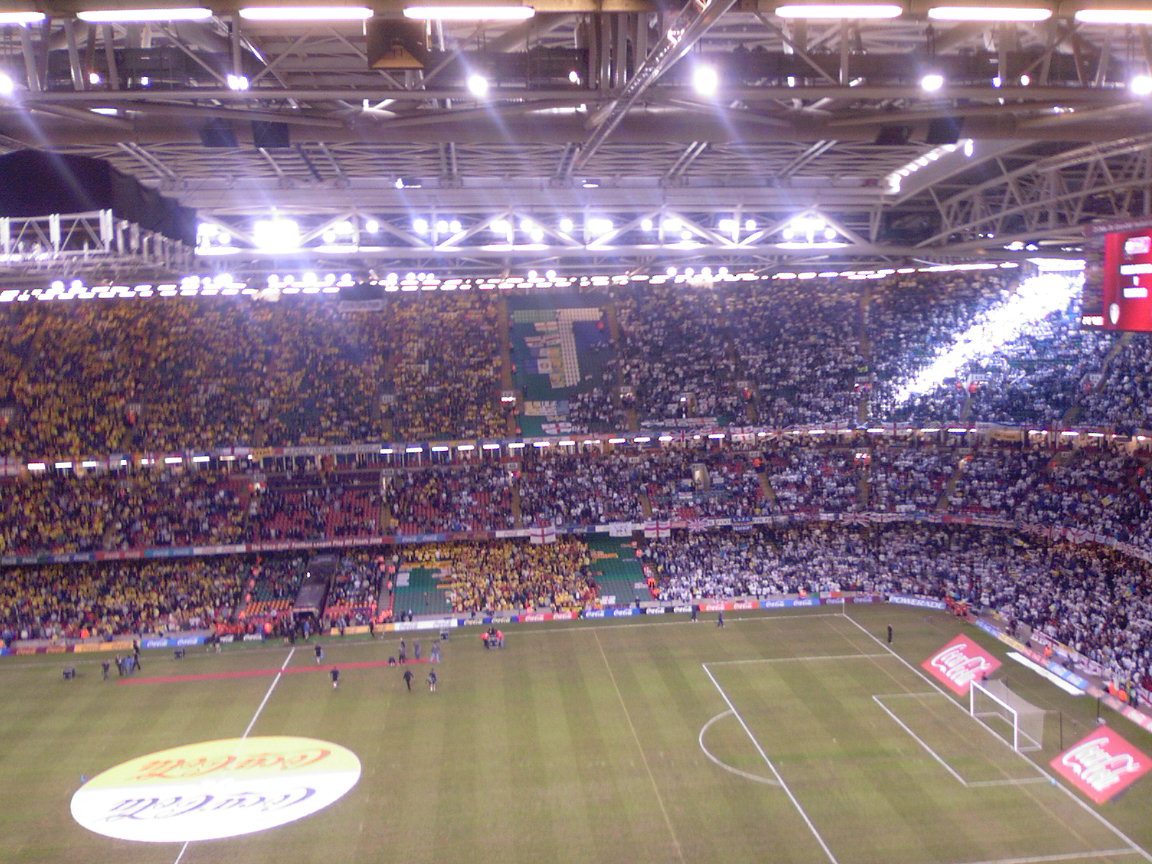
Victory in the 2006 Football League Championship play-off final against Leeds United gained Watford promotion to the Premier League

League

- First Division (level 1)
  - Runners-up: 1982–83
- Second Division / First Division / Championship (level 2)
  - Runners-up: 1981–82, 2014–15, 2020–21
  - Play-off winners: 1999, 2006
- Third Division / Second Division (level 3)
  - Champions: 1968–69, 1997–98
  - Runners-up: 1978–79
- Fourth Division (level 4)
  - Champions: 1977–78
- Southern Football League
  - Champions: 1914–15
  - Runners-up: 1919–20

Cup

- FA Cup
  - Runners-up: 1983–84, 2018–19

== Records ==
Striker Luther Blissett holds the record for Watford appearances, having played 503 matches in all competitions between 1976 and 1992, and his 415 appearances in The Football League during the same period is also a club record. Blissett holds the corresponding goalscoring records, with 186 career Watford goals, 148 of which were in the league. The records for the most league goals in a season is held by Cliff Holton, having scored 42 goals in the 1959–60 season. The highest number of goals scored by a player in a single game at a professional level is the six registered by Harry Barton against Wycombe Wanderers in September 1903.

Watford's biggest ever competitive win came in 1900, when the team defeated Maidenhead 11–0 in the Southern League Second Division. The team's biggest Football League winning margin is 8–0; this first occurred in a Third Division South match against Newport County in 1924, and was repeated in a First Division match against Sunderland in 1982. Both of these matches were at home – Watford have won an away league match by five goals on six occasions, most recently in the 6–1 win against Leeds United at Elland Road in 2012. The most goals scored in a Football League game involving Watford is 11, in Watford's 7–4 victories against Swindon Town, Torquay United and Burnley in 1934, 1937 and 2003 respectively. The club's highest home attendance is 34,099, for a fourth round FA Cup match against Manchester United on 3 February 1969. The record home league attendance is 27,968 against Queens Park Rangers in August of the same year. Watford's home capacity has since been reduced due to all-seater requirements; it currently stands at 21,577.
