= 1996 in association football =

The following are the association football events of the year 1996 throughout the world.

== Events ==
- Copa Libertadores 1996: Won by River Plate after defeating América de Cali 2–1 on aggregate.
- UEFA Euro 1996: Germany defeats the Czech Republic 2–1 with a golden goal from Oliver Bierhoff at Wembley Stadium.
- The UEFA Regions' Cup is founded for amateur teams in Europe to have an international tournament.
- February 7 – Logi Ólafsson makes his debut as the manager of Iceland with a 1–7 loss against Slovenia.
- March 3 – Dutch club NEC fires Wim Koevermans and appoints former coach Leen Looyen as his successor.
- April 6 – Major League Soccer kicks-off: an overflow crowd of 31,683 packed Spartan Stadium to witness the historic first match. San Jose Clash forward Eric Wynalda scored the league's first goal in a 1–0 victory over D.C. United.
- May 11 – Manchester United wins 1–0 over Liverpool to claim the FA Cup. United becomes the first team to win the English League and Cup Double twice.
- May 16 – PSV claims the KNVB Cup after defeating Sparta Rotterdam at De Kuip, 5–2.
- August 18 – PSV wins the Johan Cruyff Shield, the annual opening of the new season in the Eredivisie, following a 3–0 win over Ajax.
- August 27 – Manager Alan Ball is fired by Manchester City and succeeded by Steve Coppell.
- October 9 – Manager Huub Stevens leaves Roda JC. He is replaced by interim-coach Eddy Achterberg, and later by Martin Jol.
- November 8 – Phil Neal replaces Manchester City manager Steve Coppell as caretaker, to be succeeded by Frank Clark on December 29.
- November 26 – Juventus wins the Intercontinental Cup in Tokyo after defeating Argentina's River Plate 1–0. The match's only goal is scored by Alessandro del Piero in the 81st minute.

Undated:

- Heidelberg Ball School is founded in Germany.

== Winner club national championships ==
=== Asia ===
- Japan – Kashima Antlers
- Lebanon – Al-Ansar
- Qatar – Al-Arabi
- South Korea – Ulsan Hyundai Horang-i
- Iran – Persepolis

=== Europe ===
- Croatia – Dinamo Zagreb
- Czech Republic – Slavia Prague
- England – Manchester United
- France – Auxerre
- Germany – Borussia Dortmund
- Italy – A.C. Milan
- Netherlands – Ajax
- Poland – Widzew Łódź
- Portugal – Porto
- Scotland – Rangers
- Spain – Atlético Madrid
- Turkey – Fenerbahçe
- (Serbia and Montenegro) Yugoslavia – Partizan

=== North America ===
- Mexico
  - 1995–96 – Necaxa
  - Inverno 1996 – Santos
- United States
  - Seattle Sounders (APSL)
  - D.C. United (MLS)

=== South America ===
- Argentina
  - Clausura – Vélez Sársfield
  - Apertura – River Plate
- Bolivia – Bolívar
- Brazil – Grêmio
- Chile – Colo-Colo
- Ecuador – El Nacional
- Paraguay– Cerro Porteño
- Peru – Sporting Cristal

== International tournaments ==
- African Cup of Nations in South Africa (January 13 – February 3, 1996)
  1. South Africa
  2. Tunisia
  3. Zambia
- UEFA European Football Championship in England (June 8 – 30 1996)
  1. Germany
  2. Czech Republic
  3. —
- Baltic Cup in Narva, Estonia (July 7 – 9 1996)
  1. Lithuania
  2. Estonia
  3. Latvia
- Olympic Games in Atlanta, United States (July 20 – August 3, 1996)
  - Men's Tournament
  1. Nigeria
  2. Argentina
  3. Brazil
  - Women's Tournament
  1. United States
  2. PR China
  3. Norway

== Births ==
=== January ===
- 1 January:
  - Mahmoud Dahoud, German footballer
  - Andreas Pereira, Brazilian footballer
  - Mathias Jensen, Danish footballer
- 7 January: Isaac Success, Nigerian footballer
- 10 January: Iván Cifuentes, Spanish footballer
- 11 January: Leroy Sané, German footballer
- 14 January: Jordi Malela, Belgian footballer
- 15 January: Ebou Adams, Gambian footballer
- 21 January
  - Marco Asensio, Spanish footballer
  - Aldo Kalulu, French youth international
  - Cristian Pavón, Argentine international
- 23 January: Ruben Loftus-Cheek, English footballer
- 24 January: Patrik Schick, Czech footballer
- 26 January: Zakaria Bakkali, Belgian footballer
- 28 January: Mohamed Mushimiyimana, Rwandan footballer

=== February ===
- 2 February:
  - Gulfran Támara, Colombian footballer
  - Harry Winks, English footballer
- 11 February:
  - Jonathan Tah, German footballer
  - Lucas Torreira, Uruguayan footballer
- 14 February:
  - Lucas Hernandez, French footballer
  - Viktor Kovalenko, Ukrainian footballer
- 28 February: Danilo Barbosa, Brazilian footballer

=== March ===
- 4 March:
  - Timo Baumgartl, German footballer
  - Antonio Sanabria, Paraguayan footballer
- 6 March: Timo Werner, German footballer
- 7 March: Quentin Martin, French footballer
- 15 March: Levin Öztunalı, German footballer
- 19 March: Birkan Öksüz, Turkish footballer
- 24 March: Valentino Lazaro, Austrian footballer
- 28 March: Benjamin Pavard, French footballer

=== April ===
- 2 April: André Onana, Cameroonian footballer
- 9 April: Giovani Lo Celso, Argentinian footballer
- 10 April: Andreas Christensen, Danish footballer
- 11 April: Dele Alli, English footballer
- 29 April: Gustav Engvall, Swedish footballer

=== May ===
- 1 May: Nicolas Mohr, Austrian footballer
- 2 May: Julian Brandt, German footballer
- 3 May: Alex Iwobi, Nigerian footballer
- 5 May: Matheus Pereira, Brazilian footballer
- 11 May: Andrés Cubas, Argentine-born Paraguayan footballer
- 16 May: Mustapha Njie, Gambian footballer
- 17 May: Youcef Atal, Algerian footballer
- 26 May: Lukáš Haraslín, Slovak footballer
- 30 May: Aleksandr Golovin, Russian footballer

=== June ===
- 11 June: Hakeeb Adelakun, English footballer
- 12 June: Davinson Sánchez, Colombian footballer
- 13 June: Kingsley Coman, French footballer
- 17 June: Godfred Donsah, Ghanese footballer
- 18 June: Alen Halilović, Croatian footballer
- 22 June:
  - Yusupha Bobb, Gambian footballer
  - Mikel Merino, Spanish footballer
- 28 June
  - Demarai Gray, Jamaican footballer
  - Milot Rashica, Kosovar footballer
- 29 June: Bart Ramselaar, Dutch international footballer

=== July ===
- 3 July: Kumaahran Sathasivam, Malaysian footballer
- 5 July: Ajdin Hrustic, Australian footballer
- 7 July: Ivan Ljubic, Austrian footballer
- 11 July: Andrija Živković, Serbian footballer
- 12 July: Moussa Dembélé, French footballer
- 18 July:
  - Dzhamaldin Khodzhaniyazov, Russian footballer
  - Siebe Schrijvers, Belgian footballer
- 22 July: Indy Groothuizen, Dutch footballer
- 26 July: Thomas Hooyberghs, Belgian footballer

=== August ===
- 7 August: Dani Ceballos, Spanish footballer
- 12 August: Arthur, Brazilian footballer
- 14 August: Neal Maupay, French footballer
- 19 August: Almoez Ali, Sudanese-Qatari footballer
- 21 August: Sofyan Amrabat, Dutch-born Moroccan footballer
- 27 August: Ebru Topçu, Turkish footballer
- 30 August: Gabriel Barbosa, Brazilian footballer

=== September ===
- 1 September: Robby Ndefe, Dutch-Angolan footballer
- 5 September: Richairo Zivkovic, Dutch footballer
- 16 September: Alexis Blin, French footballer
- 17 September: Duje Ćaleta-Car, Croatian footballer
- 20 September: Jerome Sinclair, English footballer
- 25 September:
  - Max Christiansen, German footballer
  - Rannick Schoop, Curaçoan footballer
- 27 September: Maxwel Cornet, French-Ivorian footballer

=== October ===
- 3 October: Kelechi Iheanacho, Nigerian footballer
- 12 October: Riechedly Bazoer, Dutch footballer
- 13 October: Terens Puhiri, Indonesian footballer
- 15 October: Charly Musonda, Belgian footballer
- 27 October: Nadiem Amiri, German footballer

=== November ===
- 9 November: Kasey Palmer, English-born Jamaican footballer
- 23 November: James Maddison, English footballer
- 29 November: Gonçalo Guedes, Portuguese footballer

=== December ===
- 4 December: Diogo Jota, Portuguese footballer (died 2025)
- 8 December: Scott McTominay, Scottish footballer
- 15 December: Oleksandr Zinchenko, Ukrainian footballer
- 16 December:
  - Wilfred Ndidi, Nigerian footballer
  - Sergio Reguilón, Spanish footballer
- 19 December
  - Mouctar Diakhaby, French-born Guinean footballer
  - Franck Kessié, Ivorian footballer

== Deaths ==
=== January ===
- January 2 – Karl Rappan (90), Austrian footballer and manager

=== February ===
- February 23 – Helmut Schön (80), German footballer and manager

=== May ===
- May 11 – Ademir Marques de Menezes, Brazilian striker, top scorer at the 1950 FIFA World Cup. (73)
- May 16 – Danilo Alvim, Brazilian midfielder, runner up at the 1950 FIFA World Cup. (75)

=== August ===
- August 2 – Obdulio Varela, Uruguayan midfielder, winner as captain of the 1950 FIFA World Cup, commonly regarded as one of the greatest classic holding midfielders. (78)

=== September ===
- September 17 – Teodoro "Lolo" Fernandez (84), Peruvian footballer
- September 22 – Svetislav Valjarević (85), Serbian Yugoslav international footballer

=== October ===
- October 4 – Silvio Piola, Italian striker, winner of the 1938 FIFA World Cup, scoring two goals in the final. Highest goalscorer in Italian first league history. (83)
- October 30 – Roberto Belangero, Brazilian midfielder, runner-up at the 1957 South American Championship. (68)

=== November ===
- November 7 – Hans Klodt (82), German international footballer
- November 26 – Guido Gratton (64), Italian footballer
