= 2024–25 Fatih Karagümrük S.K. season =

Fatih Karagümrük S.K.
2024–25 season
- Manager: Atılay Canel (until 16 January); Orhan Ak (from 17 January)
- Stadium: Atatürk Olympic Stadium
- TFF First League: 3rd
- Turkish Cup: Group stage
- Top goalscorer: League: Wesley Moraes (18); All: Wesley Moraes (18)

"The 2024–25 season is the 99th season in the history of Fatih Karagümrük S.K. and their first season back in the TFF First League following relegation from the Süper Lig in 2023–24. The club will compete in the TFF First League and the Turkish Cup.

== Players ==
As of 12 February 2025

Note: Flags indicate national team as defined under FIFA eligibility rules; some limited exceptions apply. Players may hold more than one non-FIFA nationality.

No.	Pos.	Nation	Player
1	GK	TUR	Emre Bilgin (on loan from Beşiktaş)
2	DF	TUR	İrfan Köse
3	DF	SEN	Papy Djilobodji
4	DF	TUR	Yiğit Efe Demir (on loan from Fenerbahçe)
5	DF	TUR	Alper Demirol
6	DF	TUR	Berkay Dabanlı
7	MF	POR	João Camacho
9	FW	BRA	Wesley
10	FW	AUT	Nikola Dovedan
11	MF	JAM	Daniel Johnson
14	MF	CIV	Marius Tresor Doh (on loan from Fenerbahçe)
15	DF	TUR	Salih Dursun
16	MF	TUR	Tuğbey Akgün
17	FW	TUR	Ahmet Sivri
18	FW	TUR	Arda Akgün (on loan from Fenerbahçe)

No.	Pos.	Nation	Player
19	FW	TUR	Göktan Gürpüz (on loan from Trabzonspor)
20	MF	BEL	Muhammed Mert
22	DF	TUR	Emir Tintiş
23	DF	TUR	Talha Ülvan
33	DF	TUR	Çağtay Kurukalıp
35	DF	TUR	Atakan Çankaya
70	FW	BRA	Serginho
72	MF	TUR	Barış Kalaycı
77	FW	TUR	Tarık Tuğyan
88	MF	TUR	Ömer Gümüş
90	FW	TUR	Baran Demiroğlu (on loan from Galatasaray)
91	FW	JAM	Andre Gray
94	DF	TUR	Anıl Yiğit Çınar
97	GK	TUR	Furkan Onur Akyüz (on loan from Fenerbahçe)
99	GK	TUR	Furkan Bekleviç

== Transfers ==
=== In ===
Pos.	Player	Transferred from	Fee	Date	Source
MF	(Austria) Can Keleş	Austria Wien	Loan return	1 July 2024	
MF	(Portugal) João Camacho	(Portugal) Moreirense	Free	16 July 2024	
DF	(Senegal) Papy Djilobodji	(Turkey) Gaziantep	Free	16 July 2024	
MF	(Ivory Coast) Marius Trésor Doh	(Turkey) Fenerbahçe	Undisclosed	21 January 2025	
MF	(Brazil) Serginho	(Brazil) Vasco da Gama	Free	29 January 2025	
DF	(Turkey) Salih Dursun	(Turkey) Sakaryaspor	Undisclosed	11 February 2025	
MF	(Sweden) Alper Demirol	(Sweden) Hammarby IF	Free	11 February 2025	

=== Out ===
Pos.	Player	Transferred to	Fee	Date	Source
MF	(Austria) Can Keleş	(Turkey) Beşiktaş	€2,800,000	22 July 2024	
MF	(Italy) Flavio Paoletti	(Italy) Mantova	Free	26 January 2025	

== Competitions ==
=== Overview ===
Competition	First match	Last match	Starting round	Final position	Record							
Competition	First match	Last match	Starting round	Final position	Pld	W	D	L	GF	GA	GD	Win %
TFF First League	11 August 2024	10 May 2025	Matchday 1	Third	38	19	9	10	55	36	+19	50.00
Turkish Cup	29 October 2024	26 February 2025	Third round	Group stage	6	4	0	2	9	7	+2	66.67
Total					44	23	9	12	64	43	+21	52.27

Last updated: 29 March 2025
Source: Competitions

=== TFF First League ===
==== League table ====
Pos	Team	Pld	W	D	L	GF	GA	GD	Pts	Promotion, qualification or relegation
1	Kocaelispor (C, P)	38	21	9	8	68	41	+27	72	Promotion to the Süper Lig
2	Gençlerbirliği (P)	38	19	11	8	57	34	+23	68	Promotion to the Süper Lig
3	Fatih Karagümrük (O, P)	38	19	9	10	55	36	+19	66	Qualification for the Süper Lig play-off final
4	İstanbulspor	38	20	4	14	67	38	+29	64 (Note: Head-to-head points: İstanbulspor 7, Bandırmaspor 7, Erzurumspor 3. Head-to-head goal difference: İstanbulspor +1, Bandırmaspor 0.)	Qualification for the Süper Lig play-off quarter-finals
5	Bandırmaspor	38	17	13	8	52	45	+7	64	Qualification for the Süper Lig play-off quarter-finals

Source: TFF
Rules for classification: 1) Points; 2) Head-to-head points; 3) Head-to-head goal difference; 4) Head-to-head goals scored; 5) Goal difference; 6) Goals scored; 7) Play-off.
(Note: Head-to-head record is used only after all the matches between the teams in question have been played)
(C) Champions; (O) Play-off winners; (P) Promoted

==== Results summary ====
Overall								Home						Away					
Pld	W	D	L	GF	GA	GD	Pts	W	D	L	GF	GA	GD	W	D	L	GF	GA	GD
31	16	8	7	50	30	+20	56	8	4	3	26	13	+13	8	4	4	24	17	+7

Last updated: 29 March 2025.
Source: 1. Lig

==== Matches ====
11 August 2024 1	Fatih Karagümrük	0–0	Amed

18 August 2024 2	Çorum	2–2	Fatih Karagümrük

24 August 2024 3	Fatih Karagümrük	0–2	Manisa

31 August 2024 4	Ümraniyespor	2–2	Fatih Karagümrük

15 September 2024 5	Fatih Karagümrük	3–2	Ankaragücü

23 September 2024 6	Şanlıurfaspor	1–3	Fatih Karagümrük

30 September 2024 7	Fatih Karagümrük	1–0	İstanbulspor

5 October 2024 8	Fatih Karagümrük	4–0	Sakaryaspor

19 October 2024 9	Bandırmaspor	1–0	Fatih Karagümrük

25 October 2024 10	Fatih Karagümrük	4–0	Adanaspor

2 November 2024 11	Kocaelispor	2–1	Fatih Karagümrük

9 November 2024 12	Fatih Karagümrük	6–1	Yeni Malatyaspor

24 November 2024 13	Erzurumspor	1–3	Fatih Karagümrük

1 December 2024 14	Fatih Karagümrük	1–0	Esenler Erokspor

8 December 2024 15	Gençlerbirliği	1–0	Fatih Karagümrük

14 December 2024 16	Fatih Karagümrük	2–2	Boluspor

22 December 2024 17	Ankara Keçiörengücü	0–1	Fatih Karagümrük

4 January 2025 18	Fatih Karagümrük	0–2	Pendikspor

11 January 2025 19	Iğdır	0–1	Fatih Karagümrük

18 January 2025 20	Amed	1–1	Fatih Karagümrük

26 January 2025 21	Fatih Karagümrük	1–0	Çorum

2 February 2025 22	Manisa	2–2	Fatih Karagümrük

9 February 2025 23	Fatih Karagümrük	1–0	Ümraniyespor

13 February 2025 24	Ankaragücü	0–1	Fatih Karagümrük

17 February 2025 25	Fatih Karagümrük	1–1	Şanlıurfaspor

22 February 2025 26	İstanbulspor	2–0	Fatih Karagümrük

2 March 2025 27	Sakaryaspor	1–3	Fatih Karagümrük

5 March 2025 28	Fatih Karagümrük	1–2	Bandırmaspor

9 March 2025 29	Adanaspor	1–2	Fatih Karagümrük

16 March 2025 30	Fatih Karagümrük	1–1	Kocaelispor

29 March 2025 31	Yeni Malatyaspor	0–2	Fatih Karagümrük

===== Süper Lig play-off final =====
29 May 2025	Fatih Karagümrük	3–1 (a.e.t.)	Bandırmaspor	Atatürk Olympic Stadium
	Wesley 46'; Çankaya 91'; Sivri 105'		Çiftçi 37'	Referee: Yasin Kol

=== Turkish Cup ===
29 October 2024 Third round	Fatih Karagümrük	1–0	Tokat Bld Plevnespor	Başakşehir
				Stadium: Atatürk Olympic Stadium; Referee: Reşat Onur Coşkunses

4 December 2024 Fourth round	Fatih Karagümrük	3–0	Sarıyer	Başakşehir
				Stadium: Atatürk Olympic Stadium; Referee: Çağdaş Altay

18 December 2024 Fifth round	Ümraniyespor	1–2	Fatih Karagümrük	Ümraniye
				Stadium: Ümraniye Municipality City Stadium; Referee: Mehmet Ali Özer

==== Group stage ====
7 January 2025 1	Fatih Karagümrük	1–0	Çaykur Rizespor	Başakşehir
				Stadium: Atatürk Olympic Stadium; Referee: Reşat Onur Coşkunses

6 February 2025 2	Alanyaspor	4–1	Fatih Karagümrük	Alanya
				Stadium: Alanya Oba Stadium; Referee: Burak Olcar

26 February 2025 3	Fatih Karagümrük	1–2	İskenderunspor	Başakşehir
				Stadium: Atatürk Olympic Stadium; Referee: Ömer Faruk Gültekin
