= List of EFL Championship hat-tricks =

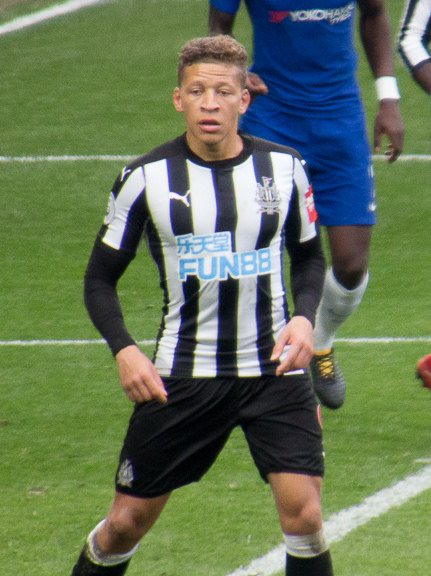
Dwight Gayle holds the record for most hat-tricks in the EFL Championship with 5.

Since the inception of the English association football league competition, the EFL Championship, in 2004, more than 60 players have scored three goals (a hat-trick) or more in a single match. The first player to achieve the feat was Englishman Marcus Stewart, who scored three times for Sunderland in a 4–0 victory at Gillingham on 11 September 2004. The fixture between Norwich City and Scunthorpe United at Carrow Road in 2011 saw both Grant Holt and Simeon Jackson score a hat-trick for the home team.

Dwight Gayle has scored a hat-trick on five occasions in the Football League Championship. He and Chris Iwelumo scored a hat-trick for three clubs.

The list includes only hat-tricks scored in the league; hat-tricks scored in play-off matches are not counted.

== Hat-tricks ==
Key
^{4}	Player scored four goals
†	Player scored hat-trick as a substitute
*	Home team

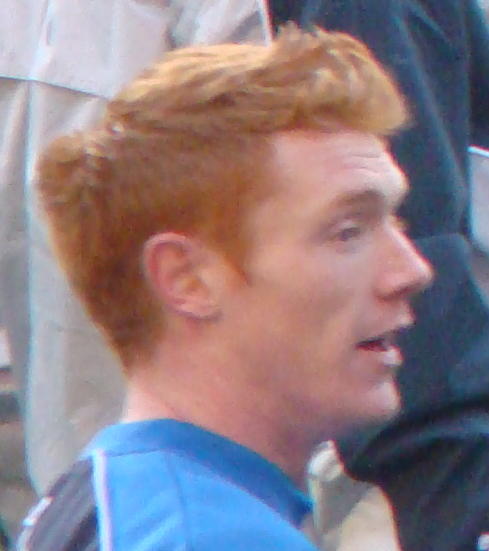
Dave Kitson scored his first hat-trick on 18 September 2004.

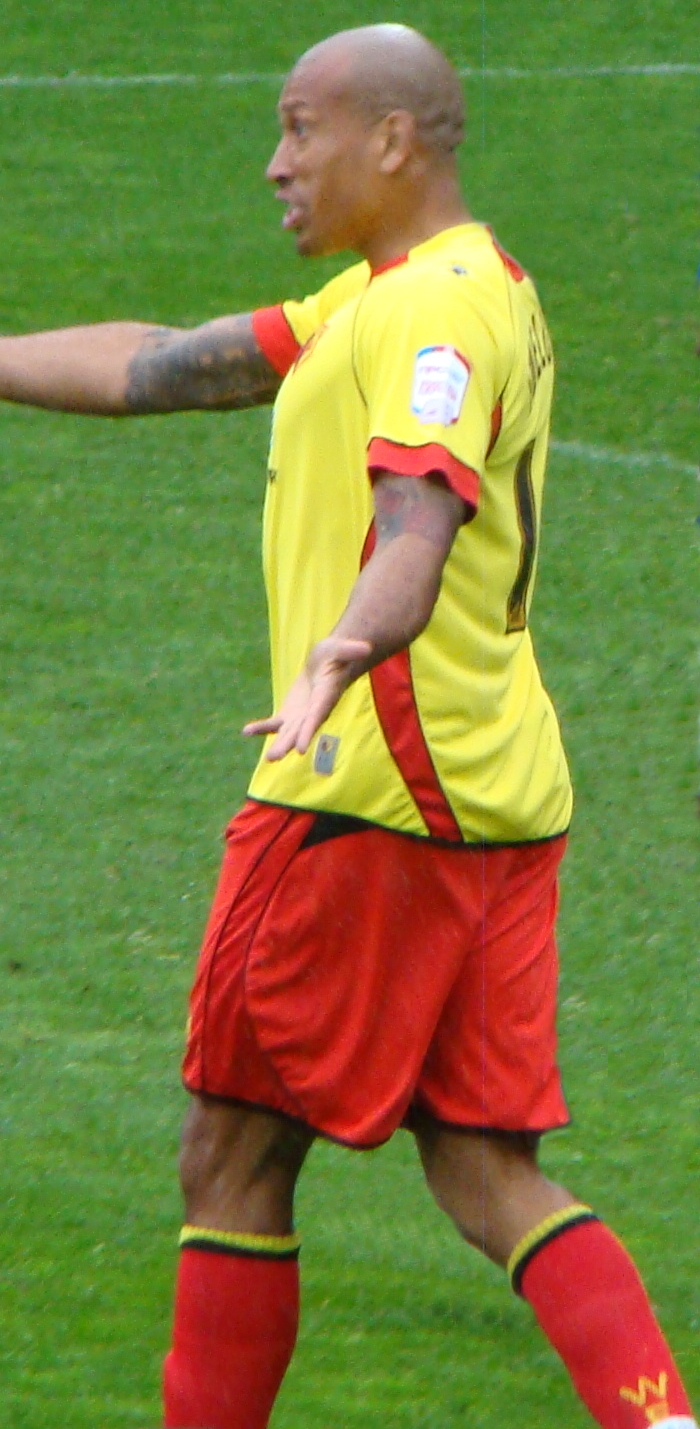
Chris Iwelumo scored three hat-tricks for three clubs.

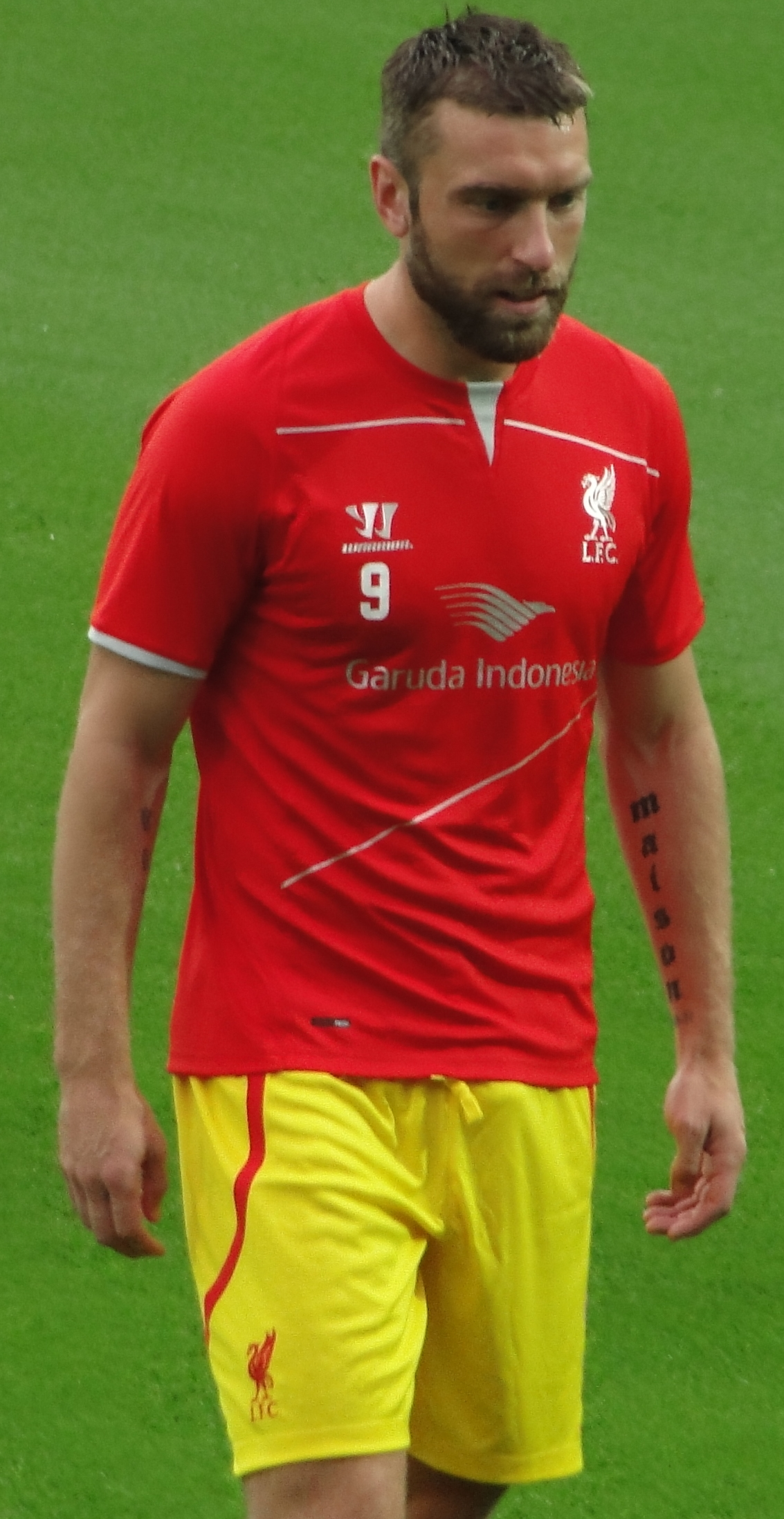
Rickie Lambert scored four hat-tricks for Southampton.

Note: The results column shows the home team score first

Player	Nationality	For	Against	Result	Date	Ref.
Marcus Stewart	England	Sunderland	Gillingham*	0–4	11 September 2004	
Dave Kitson	England	Reading*	Gillingham	3–1	18 September 2004	
Jamie Cureton	England	Queens Park Rangers*	Coventry City	4–1	28 September 2004	
Brian Deane^{4}	England	Leeds United*	Queens Park Rangers	6–1	20 November 2004	
Barry Hayles	Jamaica	Millwall	Derby County*	0–3	28 December 2004	
Richard Cresswell	England	Preston North End*	Sunderland	3–2	1 January 2005	
Marcus Stewart	England	Sunderland*	Watford	4–2	12 February 2005	
Dave Kitson	England	Reading*	West Ham United	3–1	12 March 2005	
David Connolly	Ireland	Leicester City*	Stoke City	4–2	9 August 2005	
Carl Cort	England	Wolverhampton Wanderers*	Queens Park Rangers	3–1	30 August 2005	
Rob Hulse	England	Leeds United*	Derby County	3–1	28 September 2005	
Ade Akinbiyi	Nigeria	Burnley	Luton Town*	2–3	5 November 2005	
Dave Kitson	England	Reading*	Brighton & Hove Albion	5–1	10 December 2005	
Dean Ashton	England	Norwich City*	Southampton	3–1	17 December 2005	
Vincent Péricard	France	Plymouth Argyle*	Coventry City	3–1	18 February 2006	
Adam Rooney	England	Stoke City	Brighton & Hove Albion*	1–5	30 April 2006	
Jamie Cureton	England	Colchester United*	Derby County	4–3	26 August 2006	
Gifton Noel-Williams	England	Burnley*	Barnsley	4–2	12 September 2006	
Kevin Phillips	England	West Bromwich Albion	Ipswich Town*	1–5	14 October 2006	
Alan Lee	Ireland	Ipswich Town*	Luton Town	5–0	29 October 2006	
Chris Iwelumo^{4}	Scotland	Colchester United*	Hull City	5–1	28 November 2006	
Gary McSheffrey	England	Birmingham City*	Preston North End	3–1	9 December 2006	
Michael Chopra	England	Cardiff City*	Leicester City	3–2	27 January 2007	
Andrew Surman	England	Southampton*	Barnsley	5–2	17 February 2007	
Marek Saganowski	Poland	Southampton	Wolverhampton Wanderers*	0–6	31 March 2007	
Dean Windass	England	Hull City*	Southend United	4–0	31 March 2007	
Jamie Cureton	England	Colchester United	Southend United*	0–3	6 April 2007	
Kevin Phillips	England	West Bromwich Albion*	Barnsley	7–0	6 May 2007	
James Scowcroft	England	Crystal Palace	Southampton*	1–4	11 August 2007	
Jonathan Walters	Ireland	Ipswich Town*	Bristol City	6–0	10 November 2007	
Stern John	Trinidad and Tobago	Southampton*	Hull City	4–0	8 December 2007	
Ricardo Fuller	Jamaica	Stoke City*	West Bromwich Albion	3–1	22 December 2007	
Liam Lawrence	Ireland	Stoke City	Barnsley*	3–3	26 December 2007	
Andrew Cole	England	Burnley	Queens Park Rangers*	2–4	12 February 2008	
Steve Howard	Scotland	Leicester City	West Bromwich Albion*	1–4	15 March 2008	
Jamie Cureton	England	Norwich City*	Colchester United	5–1	22 March 2008	
James Beattie	England	Sheffield United*	Leicester City	3–0	5 April 2008	
Billy Sharp	England	Sheffield United*	Queens Park Rangers	3–0	16 August 2008	
Kevin Doyle	Ireland	Reading*	Crystal Palace	4–2	30 August 2008	
Kevin Doyle	Ireland	Reading*	Sheffield Wednesday	6–0	16 September 2008	
Chris Iwelumo	Scotland	Wolverhampton Wanderers	Preston North End*	1–3	20 September 2008	
Leroy Lita	DR Congo	Norwich City*	Wolverhampton Wanderers	5–2	21 October 2008	
Sylvan Ebanks-Blake	England	Wolverhampton Wanderers*	Norwich City	3–3	3 February 2009	
Deon Burton	Jamaica	Charlton Athletic*	Norwich City	4–2	3 May 2009	
Shola Ameobi	England	Newcastle United*	Reading	3–0	15 August 2009	
Michael Chopra	England	Cardiff City	Plymouth Argyle*	1–3	18 August 2009	
Kevin Nolan	England	Newcastle United	Ipswich Town*	0–4	26 September 2009	
Michael Chopra^{4}	England	Cardiff City*	Derby County	6–1	29 September 2009	
Peter Whittingham	England	Cardiff City	Sheffield United*	3–4	24 October 2009	
Darius Henderson	England	Sheffield United	Bristol City*	2–3	28 November 2009	
Robert Earnshaw	Wales	Nottingham Forest*	Leicester City	5–1	5 December 2009	
Freddy Eastwood	Wales	Coventry City*	Peterborough United	3–2	12 December 2009	
Paul Gallagher	Scotland	Leicester City*	Scunthorpe United	5–1	13 February 2010	
Gary Hooper	England	Scunthorpe United*	Bristol City	3–0	17 April 2010	
Chris Iwelumo	Scotland	Burnley*	Preston North End	4–3	11 September 2010	
James Vaughan	England	Crystal Palace*	Portsmouth	4–1	14 September 2010	
James Coppinger	England	Doncaster Rovers*	Norwich City	3–1	14 September 2010	
Jon Parkin	England	Preston North End	Leeds United*	6–4	28 September 2010	
Jonny Howson	England	Leeds United	Scunthorpe United*	1–4	30 October 2010	
Luciano Becchio	Argentina	Leeds United*	Bristol City	3–1	13 November 2010	
Grant Holt	England	Norwich City*	Ipswich Town	4–1	28 November 2010	
Wes Hoolahan	Ireland	Norwich City*	Sheffield United	4–2	28 December 2010	
Jason Puncheon	England	Millwall*	Crystal Palace	3–0	1 January 2011	
Matty Fryatt	England	Hull City	Scunthorpe United*	1–5	5 February 2011	
Connor Wickham	England	Ipswich Town	Doncaster Rovers*	0–6	15 February 2011	
Yakubu	Nigeria	Leicester City	Middlesbrough*	3–3	2 April 2011	
Grant Holt	England	Norwich City*	Scunthorpe United	6–0	2 April 2011	
Simeon Jackson	Canada	Norwich City*	Scunthorpe United	6–0	2 April 2011	
Scott McDonald	Australia	Middlesbrough	Hull City*	2–4	22 April 2011	
Simeon Jackson	Canada	Norwich City*	Derby County	3–2	25 April 2011	
Lee Tomlin	England	Peterborough United*	Ipswich Town	7–1	20 August 2011	
Rickie Lambert	England	Southampton*	Nottingham Forest	3–2	10 September 2011	
Chris Wood	New Zealand	Birmingham City*	Millwall	3–0	11 September 2011	
Darius Henderson	England	Millwall	Leicester City*	0–3	22 October 2011	
Jonjo Shelvey	England	Blackpool	Leeds United*	0–5	2 November 2011	
Rickie Lambert	England	Southampton*	Brighton & Hove Albion	3–0	19 November 2011	
Matt Phillips	England	Blackpool	Barnsley*	1–3	26 December 2011	
Ricardo Vaz Tê	Portugal	Barnsley*	Leeds United	4–1	31 December 2011	
Darius Henderson	England	Millwall	Barnsley*	1–3	21 January 2012	
Nikola Žigić^{4}	Serbia	Birmingham City	Leeds United*	1–4	31 January 2012	
Rickie Lambert	England	Southampton	Watford*	0–3	25 February 2012	
Rickie Lambert	England	Southampton	Millwall*	2–3	17 March 2012	
Garath McCleary^{4}	Jamaica	Nottingham Forest	Leeds United*	3–7	20 March 2012	
Charlie Austin	England	Burnley	Portsmouth*	1–5	31 March 2012	
Radosław Majewski	Poland	Nottingham Forest	Crystal Palace*	0–3	31 March 2012	
Ricardo Vaz Tê	Portugal	West Ham United*	Brighton & Hove Albion	6–0	14 April 2012	
Matty Fryatt	England	Hull City*	Barnsley	3–1	17 April 2012	
Peter Whittingham	England	Cardiff City*	Wolverhampton Wanderers	3–1	2 September 2012	
Charlie Austin	England	Burnley*	Peterborough United	5–2	15 September 2012	
Glenn Murray	England	Crystal Palace*	Cardiff City	3–2	22 September 2012	
Craig Davies^{4}	Wales	Barnsley	Birmingham City*	0–5	22 September 2012	
David Nugent	England	Leicester City*	Hull City	3–1	23 September 2012	
Emile Sinclair	England	Peterborough United	Hull City*	1–3	29 September 2012	
Charlie Austin	England	Burnley*	Sheffield Wednesday	3–3	2 October 2012	
Marlon King	Jamaica	Birmingham City	Millwall*	3–3	23 October 2012	
Glenn Murray	England	Crystal Palace*	Ipswich Town	5–0	6 November 2012	
Jordan Rhodes	Scotland	Blackburn Rovers	Peterborough United*	1–4	17 November 2012	
Chris Wood	New Zealand	Leicester City	Bristol City*	0–4	12 January 2013	
Radosław Majewski	Poland	Nottingham Forest*	Huddersfield Town	6–1	19 February 2013	
Dwight Gayle	England	Peterborough United	Blackburn Rovers*	2–3	2 March 2013	
Leonardo Ulloa	Argentina	Brighton & Hove Albion*	Huddersfield Town	4–1	2 March 2013	
Kevin Phillips	England	Crystal Palace*	Hull City	4–2	5 March 2013	
James Vaughan	England	Huddersfield Town	Bristol City*	1–3	27 April 2013	
Troy Deeney	England	Watford*	Bournemouth	6–1	10 August 2013	
James Vaughan	England	Huddersfield Town*	Bournemouth	5–1	24 August 2013	
Craig Bryson	Scotland	Derby County	Millwall*	1–5	14 September 2013	
Jesse Lingard^{4}	England	Birmingham City*	Sheffield Wednesday	4–1	21 September 2013	
Ross McCormack^{4}	Scotland	Leeds United	Charlton Athletic*	2–4	9 November 2013	
Chris Martin	England	Derby County*	Blackpool	5–1	7 December 2013	
Adam Le Fondre	England	Reading*	Bolton Wanderers	7–1	18 January 2014	
Adam Le Fondre	England	Reading*	Blackpool	5–1	28 January 2014	
Ross McCormack	Scotland	Leeds United*	Huddersfield Town	5–1	1 February 2014	
Yann Kermorgant	France	Bournemouth*	Doncaster Rovers	5–0	1 March 2014	
Jordan Rhodes	Scotland	Blackburn Rovers	Huddersfield Town*	2–4	15 March 2014	
Craig Bryson	Scotland	Derby County*	Nottingham Forest	5–0	22 March 2014	
Rudy Gestede	Benin	Blackburn Rovers	Birmingham City*	2–4	21 April 2014	
Marvin Sordell	England	Charlton Athletic	Sheffield Wednesday*	2–3	21 April 2014	
Danny Ward	England	Huddersfield Town	Watford*	1–4	3 May 2014	
Callum Harriott	England	Charlton Athletic	Blackpool*	0–3	3 May 2014	
Joe Mason	Ireland	Bolton Wanderers*	Rotherham United	3–2	16 September 2014	
Britt Assombalonga	DR Congo	Nottingham Forest*	Fulham	5–3	17 September 2014	
Marc Pugh	England	Bournemouth	Birmingham City*	0–8	25 October 2014	
Troy Deeney	England	Watford	Fulham*	0–5	5 December 2014	
Jelle Vossen	Belgium	Middlesbrough	Millwall*	1–5	6 December 2014	
Demarai Gray	England	Birmingham City*	Reading	6–1	13 December 2014	
Clayton Donaldson	England	Birmingham City*	Wigan Athletic	3–1	10 January 2015	
Ross McCormack	Scotland	Fulham*	Nottingham Forest	3–2	21 January 2015	
Odion Ighalo^{4}	Nigeria	Watford*	Blackpool	7–2	24 January 2015	
Gary Hooper	England	Norwich City*	Blackpool	4–0	7 February 2015	
Jon Toral	Spain	Brentford*	Blackpool	4–0	24 February 2015	
Brett Pitman	England	Bournemouth*	Blackpool	4–0	14 March 2015	
Rudy Gestede	Benin	Blackburn Rovers *	Nottingham Forest	3–3	18 April 2015	
Lee Gregory	England	Millwall*	Derby County	3–3	25 April 2015	
Ross McCormack	Scotland	Fulham*	Middlesbrough	4–3	25 April 2015	
Orlando Sá	Portugal	Reading*	Ipswich Town	5–1	11 September 2015	
Clayton Donaldson	England	Birmingham City*	Bristol City	4–2	12 September 2015	
Daryl Murphy	Ireland	Ipswich Town	Rotherham United*	2–5	7 November 2015	
Tom Ince	England	Derby County*	Bristol City	4–0	15 December 2015	
Andre Gray	England	Burnley*	Bristol City	4–0	28 December 2015	
Abel Hernández	Uruguay	Hull City*	Charlton Athletic	6–0	16 January 2016	
Yaya Sanogo	France	Charlton Athletic*	Reading	3–4	27 February 2016	
Tomer Hemed	Israel	Brighton & Hove Albion*	Fulham	5–0	15 April 2016	
Grant Ward	England	Ipswich Town*	Barnsley	4–2	6 August 2016	
Scott Hogan	England	Brentford*	Preston North End	5–0	17 September 2016	
Dwight Gayle	England	Newcastle United*	Norwich City	4–3	28 September 2016	
Glenn Murray	England	Brighton & Hove Albion*	Norwich City	5–0	29 October 2016	
Henri Lansbury	England	Nottingham Forest	Barnsley*	2–5	25 November 2016	
Dwight Gayle	England	Newcastle United*	Birmingham City	4–0	10 December 2016	
Nélson Oliveira	Portugal	Norwich City*	Derby County	3–0	2 January 2017	
Jota	Spain	Brentford*	Rotherham United	4–2	25 February 2017	
David Nugent	England	Derby County*	Fulham	4–2	4 April 2017	
Nick Powell†	England	Wigan Athletic*	Barnsley	3–2	13 April 2017	
Abel Hernández	Uruguay	Hull City*	Burton Albion	4–1	12 August 2017	
Conor Hourihane	Ireland	Aston Villa*	Norwich City	4–2	19 August 2017	
Kieran Dowell	England	Nottingham Forest	Hull City*	2–3	28 October 2017	
Leon Clarke^{4}	England	Sheffield United*	Hull City	4–1	4 November 2017	
Ryan Sessegnon	England	Fulham	Sheffield United*	4–5	21 November 2017	
Leon Clarke	England	Sheffield United*	Fulham	4–5	21 November 2017	
Matěj Vydra	Czech Republic	Derby County	Middlesbrough*	0–3	25 November 2017	
Kemar Roofe	Jamaica	Leeds United	Queens Park Rangers*	1–3	9 December 2017	
Patrick Bamford	England	Middlesbrough*	Leeds United	3–0	2 March 2018	
Bobby De Cordova-Reid	Jamaica	Bristol City*	Sheffield Wednesday	4–0	3 March 2018	
James Maddison	England	Norwich City	Hull City*	4–3	10 March 2018	
Atdhe Nuhiu	Kosovo	Sheffield Wednesday*	Norwich City	5–1	6 May 2018	
Lukas Jutkiewicz	England	Birmingham City*	Rotherham United	3–1	6 October 2018	
Billy Sharp	England	Sheffield United*	Wigan Athletic	4–2	27 October 2018	
Ché Adams	Scotland	Birmingham City*	Hull City	3–3	10 November 2018	
Tammy Abraham^{4}	England	Aston Villa*	Nottingham Forest	5–5	28 November 2018	
Danny Graham	England	Blackburn Rovers*	Sheffield Wednesday	4–2	1 December 2018	
Dwight Gayle	England	West Bromwich Albion	Rotherham United*	0–4	22 December 2018	
Billy Sharp	England	Sheffield United	Aston Villa*	3–3	8 February 2019	
Ché Adams	Scotland	Birmingham City	Queens Park Rangers*	3–4	9 February 2019	
Saïd Benrahma	Algeria	Brentford*	Hull City	5–1	23 February 2019	
Martyn Waghorn	England	Derby County*	Rotherham United	6–1	30 March 2019	
Andreas Weimann	Austria	Bristol City	Sheffield United*	2–3	30 March 2019	
Mason Mount	England	Derby County*	Bolton Wanderers	4–0	13 April 2019	
Dwight Gayle	England	West Bromwich Albion*	Preston North End	4–1	13 April 2019	
Ollie Watkins	England	Brentford	Barnsley*	1–3	29 September 2019	
Aleksandar Mitrović	Serbia	Fulham*	Luton Town	3–2	23 October 2019	
Joe Ralls	England	Cardiff City*	Birmingham City	4–2	2 November 2019	
Josh Dasilva	England	Brentford*	Luton Town	7–0	30 November 2019	
George Pușcaș	Romania	Reading	Wigan Athletic*	3–1	30 November 2019	
Conor Chaplin	England	Barnsley*	Queens Park Rangers	5–3	14 December 2019	
Jordan Rhodes	Scotland	Sheffield Wednesday	Nottingham Forest*	0–4	14 December 2019	
Nahki Wells	Bermuda	Queens Park Rangers*	Cardiff City	6–1	1 January 2020	
Saïd Benrahma	Algeria	Brentford	Hull City*	1–5	1 February 2020	
Matt Smith	England	Millwall	Nottingham Forest*	0–3	6 March 2020	
Louie Sibley	England	Derby County	Millwall*	2–3	20 June 2020	
Yakou Méïté^{4}	Ivory Coast	Reading	Luton Town*	0–5	4 July 2020	
Saïd Benrahma	Algeria	Brentford*	Wigan Athletic	3–0	4 July 2020	
Kieran Dowell	England	Wigan Athletic*	Hull City	8–0	14 July 2020	
Adam Armstrong	England	Blackburn Rovers*	Wycombe Wanderers	5–0	19 September 2020	
James Collins	Ireland	Luton Town*	Preston North End	3–0	12 December 2020	
Sergi Canós	Spain	Brentford	Cardiff City*	2–3	26 December 2020	
Ivan Toney	England	Brentford*	Wycombe Wanderers	7–2	30 January 2021	
Teemu Pukki	Finland	Norwich City*	Huddersfield Town	7–0	6 April 2021	
Adam Armstrong	England	Blackburn Rovers*	Huddersfield Town	5–2	24 April 2021	
Harry Wilson	Wales	Cardiff City	Birmingham City*	0–4	1 May 2021	
Adam Armstrong	England	Blackburn Rovers*	Birmingham City	5–2	8 May 2021	
John Swift	England	Reading*	Queens Park Rangers	3–3	11 September 2021	
Ben Brereton Díaz	Chile	Blackburn Rovers*	Cardiff City	5–1	25 September 2021	
Aleksandar Mitrović	Serbia	Fulham*	Swansea City	3–1	29 September 2021	
Aleksandar Mitrović	Serbia	Fulham*	West Bromwich Albion	3–0	30 October 2021	
Andreas Weimann	Austria	Bristol City*	Millwall	3–2	2 January 2022	
Aleksandar Mitrović	Serbia	Fulham*	Bristol City	6–2	15 January 2022	
Danny Ward	England	Huddersfield Town	Reading*	3–4	22 January 2022	
Sam Surridge	England	Nottingham Forest*	Swansea City	5–1	30 April 2022	
Óscar Estupiñán	Colombia	Hull City*	Coventry City	3–2	27 August 2022	
Scott Hogan	Ireland	Birmingham City	West Bromwich Albion*	2–3	14 September 2022	
Tom Bradshaw	Wales	Millwall*	Watford	3–0	19 October 2022	
Zian Flemming	Netherlands	Millwall	Preston North End*	2–4	12 November 2022	
Chuba Akpom	England	Middlesbrough*	Wigan Athletic	4–1	26 December 2022	
Nathan Tella	Nigeria	Burnley*	Preston North End	3–0	11 February 2023	
Tom Bradshaw	Wales	Millwall*	Sheffield United	3–2	18 February 2023	
Nathan Tella	Nigeria	Burnley	Hull City*	1–3	15 March 2023	
Ozan Tufan	Turkey	Hull City*	Sheffield Wednesday	4–2	12 August 2023	
Morgan Whittaker	England	Plymouth Argyle*	Norwich City	6–2	23 September 2023	
Ellis Simms	England	Coventry City*	Rotherham United	5–0	5 March 2024	
Milutin Osmajić	Montenegro	Preston North End*	Huddersfield Town	4–1	9 April 2024	
Abdul Fatawu	Ghana	Leicester City*	Southampton	5–0	23 April 2024	
Josh Maja	Nigeria	West Bromwich Albion	Queens Park Rangers*	1–3	10 August 2024	
Borja Sainz	Spain	Norwich City	Derby County*	2–3	28 September 2024	
Tom Cannon^{4}	Ireland	Stoke City*	Portsmouth	6–1	2 October 2024	
Vakoun Bayo^{4}	Ivory Coast	Watford	Sheffield Wednesday*	2–6	2 November 2024	
Emmanuel Latte Lath	Ivory Coast	Middlesbrough	Oxford United*	2–6	23 November 2024	
Borja Sainz	Spain	Norwich City*	Plymouth Argyle	6–1	26 November 2024	
Callum Lang^{4}	England	Portsmouth*	Coventry City	4–1	21 December 2024	
Haji Wright	United States	Coventry City*	Sunderland	3–0	15 March 2025	
Colby Bishop	England	Portsmouth	Norwich City*	3–5	18 April 2025	
Joël Piroe^{4}	Suriname	Leeds United*	Stoke City	6–0	21 April 2025	
Jaden Philogene	England	Ipswich Town*	Sheffield United	5–0	12 September 2025	
Kieffer Moore	Wales	Wrexham*	Coventry City	3–2	31 October 2025	
Carlton Morris	England	Derby County	Sheffield United*	1–3	1 November 2025	
Divin Mubama	England	Stoke City*	Bristol City	5–1	1 November 2025	
Tom Ince	England	Watford*	Birmingham City	3–0	1 January 2026	
Mohamed Touré	Australia	Norwich City	Oxford United*	0–3	10 February 2026	
Haji Wright	United States	Coventry City*	Middlesbrough	3–1	16 February 2026	
Mohamed Touré	Australia	Norwich City	Bristol City*	2–4	18 April 2026	
Adrian Segečić	Croatia	Portsmouth	Stoke City*	1–3	25 April 2026	
Ellis Simms	England	Coventry City	Watford*	0–4	2 May 2026	
Richard Kone	Ivory Coast	Queens Park Rangers*	Swansea City	5–0	24 October 2026	
Sydie Peck	England	Sheffield United	Preston North End*	2–3	3 November 2026	
Jack Moylan	Ireland	Cardiff City*	West Ham United	3–3	4 November 2026	

== Multiple hat-tricks ==
Up to and including 24 October 2026.

Rank	Player	Hat-tricks
1	(England) Dwight Gayle	5
2	(England) Michael Chopra	4
2	(England) Jamie Cureton	4
2	(England) Andy Johnson	4
2	(England) Rickie Lambert	4
2	(Scotland) Ross McCormack	4
2	(Serbia) Aleksandar Mitrović	4
8	(England) Adam Armstrong	3
8	(England) Charlie Austin	3
8	(Republic of Ireland) David Connolly	3
8	(England) Darius Henderson	3
8	(Scotland) Chris Iwelumo	3
8	(England) Dave Kitson	3
8	(England) Glenn Murray	3
8	(England) Kevin Phillips	3
8	(Scotland) Jordan Rhodes	3
8	(England) Billy Sharp	3
8	(England) James Vaughan	3
19	(Scotland) Ché Adams	2
19	(England) Dean Ashton	2
19	(Algeria) Saïd Benrahma	2
19	(Wales) Tom Bradshaw	2
19	(Scotland) Craig Bryson	2
19	(England) Leon Clarke	2
19	(England) Troy Deeney	2
19	(England) Clayton Donaldson	2
19	(England) Kieran Dowell	2
19	(Republic of Ireland) Kevin Doyle	2
19	(Wales) Robert Earnshaw	2
19	(England) Nicky Forster	2
19	(England) Matty Fryatt	2
19	(Jamaica) Ricardo Fuller	2
19	(Benin) Rudy Gestede	2
19	(England) Marlon Harewood	2
19	(Uruguay) Abel Hernández	2
19	(England) Grant Holt	2
19	(England) Gary Hooper	2
19	(England) Tom Ince	2
19	(Canada) Simeon Jackson	2
19	(England) Adam Le Fondre	2
19	(Poland) Radosław Majewski	2
19	(England) David Nugent	2
19	(Spain) Borja Sainz	2
19	(England) Ellis Simms	2
19	(England) Marcus Stewart	2
19	(Nigeria) Nathan Tella	2
19	(Australia) Mohamed Touré	2
19	(Portugal) Ricardo Vaz Tê	2
19	(England) Danny Ward	2
19	(Austria) Andreas Weimann	2
19	(England) Peter Whittingham	2
19	(New Zealand) Chris Wood	2
19	(United States) Haji Wright	2

== Hat-tricks by club ==
Up to and including 4 November 2026.

Club	Hat-tricks
Norwich City	16
Birmingham City	12
Reading	11
Brentford	10
Burnley	10
Derby County	10
Blackburn Rovers	9
Millwall	9
Cardiff City	8
Leeds United	8
Nottingham Forest	8
Sheffield United	8
Fulham	7
Hull City	7
Leicester City	7
Southampton	7
Ipswich Town	6
Coventry City	5
Crystal Palace	5
Middlesbrough	5
Stoke City	5
Watford	5
West Bromwich Albion	5
Charlton Athletic	4
Huddersfield Town	4
Newcastle United	4
Barnsley	3
Brighton & Hove Albion	3
Bristol City	3
Bournemouth	3
Colchester United	3
Peterborough United	3
Portsmouth	3
Preston North End	3
Queens Park Rangers	3
Wolverhampton Wanderers	3
Aston Villa	2
Blackpool	2
Plymouth Argyle	2
Sheffield Wednesday	2
Sunderland	2
Wigan Athletic	2
Bolton Wanderers	1
Doncaster Rovers	1
Luton Town	1
Scunthorpe United	1
West Ham United	1
Wrexham	1

== See also ==
- List of Premier League hat-tricks
- List of EFL League One hat-tricks
- List of EFL League Two hat-tricks
