= Ahmet Sivri =

Turkish Cypriot footballer

Personal information
- Date of birth: 6 July 1999 (age 27)
- Place of birth: North Nicosia, Northern Cyprus
- Height: 1.85 m (6 ft 1 in)
- Position: Striker

Team information
- Current team: Erzincanspor
- Number: 10

Youth career
- Yenicami
- 2017–2019: Galatasaray

Senior career*
Years	Team	Apps	(Gls)
2015–2017	Yenicami	11	(5)
2019–2020	Galatasaray	0	(0)
2019–2020	→ Sancaktepe (loan)	20	(3)
2020–2023	Ankara Demirspor	77	(13)
2023–2024	İskenderunspor	35	(10)
2024–2026	Fatih Karagümrük	31	(0)
2026–	Erzincanspor	5	(1)

International career
2018–	Northern Cyprus		
- * Club domestic league appearances and goals as of 11 October 2026

Ahmet Sivri (born 6 July 1999) is a Turkish Cypriot footballer who plays as a striker for Turkish TFF 2. Lig club Erzincanspor.

== Career ==
In 2017, Sivri signed for Turkish top flight side Galatasaray. In 2020, he signed for Ankara Demirspor in the Turkish third tier.
