= Emre Topçu =

Turkish footballer

Personal information
- Full name: Emre Thomas Topçu
- Date of birth: 21 August 2005 (age 21)
- Place of birth: Duleek, Ireland
- Position: Midfielder

Team information
- Current team: Zonguldak Kömürspor

Youth career
- –2019: St Kevin's Boys
- 2019: Belvedere
- 2020–2022: Drogheda United

Senior career*
Years	Team	Apps	(Gls)
2022–2024	Drogheda United	10	(0)
2024	→ Longford Town (loan)	11	(1)
2025	Longford Town	31	(1)
2026	İskenderunspor	16	(0)
2026–	Zonguldak Kömürspor	4	(0)

International career^{‡}
2022	Turkey U18	2	(0)
2025	Turkey U20	2	(0)
- * Club domestic league appearances and goals as of 13:37, 29 October 2026 (UTC) ‡ National team caps and goals as of 13:37, 29 October 2026 (UTC)

Emre Thomas Topçu (born 21 August 2005) is a football player who plays as a midfielder for TFF Third League club Zonguldak Kömürspor. Born in Ireland, he is a former youth international for Turkey.

== Professional career ==
Topçu played for St Kevin's Boys and Belvedere, before moving to Drogheda United's youth sides in 2020. He made his senior and professional debut with Drogheda United as a late substitute in a 2–0 League of Ireland loss to Sligo Rovers on 3 September 2022. On 15 September 2022, he signed a professional contract with Drogheda United for 2 years.

In July 2024, Topçu joined Longford Town on loan for the remainder of the 2024 season before signing for the club in January 2025.

In January 2026, he signed for TFF Second League club İskenderunspor.

In July 2026, he joined TFF Third League club Zonguldak Kömürspor.

== International career ==
Topçu was born in Ireland to a Turkish father and Irish mother. He is a youth international for Turkey, having been called up to the Turkey U18s in November 2022, earning his first 2 international caps in friendlies against Uzbekistan U18. In March 2025, he featured in two friendlies for Turkey U20 as they were defeated by Italy U20 and Romania U20.

== Career statistics ==
As of matches played 24 October 2026

Appearances and goals by club, season and competition
Club	Season	League			National Cup (Note: Includes FAI Cup & Turkish Cup)		Other		Total	
Club	Season	Division	Apps	Goals	Apps	Goals	Apps	Goals	Apps	Goals
Drogheda United	2022	LOI Premier Division	4	0	0	0	–		4	0
Drogheda United	2023	LOI Premier Division	5	0	0	0	1 (Note: Appearance(s) in the Leinster Senior Cup)	0	6	0
Drogheda United	2024	LOI Premier Division	1	0	–		3	1	4	1
Drogheda United	Total		10	0	0	0	4	1	14	1
Longford Town (loan)	2022	LOI First Division	11	1	1	0	–		12	1
Longford Town	2025	LOI First Division	31	1	2	0	3	0	36	1
İskenderunspor	2025–26	TFF Second League	16	0	0	0	–		16	0
Zonguldak Kömürspor	2026–27	TFF Third League	4	0	1	0	–		5	0
Career total			72	2	4	0	7	1	85	3
