= Andre Gray =

Jamaica international footballer (born 1991)

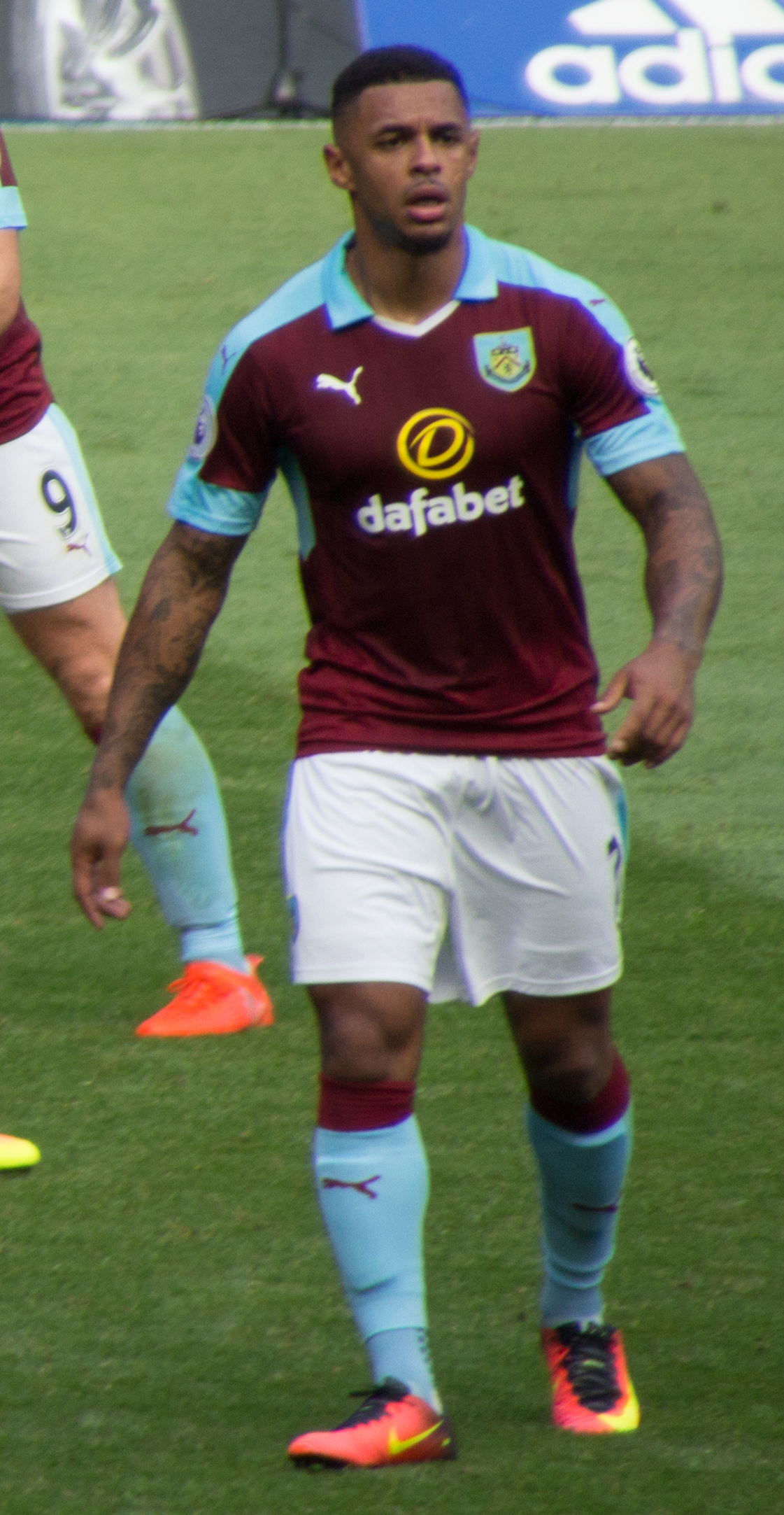
- Gray playing for Burnley in 2016

Personal information
- Full name: Andre Anthony Gray
- Date of birth: 26 June 1991 (age 35)
- Place of birth: Wolverhampton, West Midlands, England
- Height: 5 ft 10 in (1.78 m)
- Position: Centre-forward

Youth career
- –2004: Wolverhampton Wanderers
- 2004–2009: Shrewsbury Town

Senior career*
| Years | Team | Apps | (Gls) |
| 2009–2010 | Shrewsbury Town | 4 | (0) |
| 2009–2010 | → AFC Telford United (loan) | 6 | (1) |
| 2010 | → Hinckley United (loan) | 5 | (0) |
| 2010–2012 | Hinckley United | 65 | (29) |
| 2012 | → Luton Town (loan) | 9 | (5) |
| 2012–2014 | Luton Town | 88 | (47) |
| 2014–2015 | Brentford | 47 | (18) |
| 2015–2017 | Burnley | 73 | (32) |
| 2017–2022 | Watford | 113 | (19) |
| 2021–2022 | → Queens Park Rangers (loan) | 28 | (10) |
| 2022–2023 | Aris | 32 | (8) |
| 2023–2024 | Al-Riyadh | 26 | (7) |
| 2024–2025 | Plymouth Argyle | 13 | (3) |
| 2025–2026 | Fatih Karagümrük | 24 | (2) |
| 2026 | Port Vale | 11 | (0) |

International career
| 2012–2014 | England C | 6 | (2) |
| 2021–2022 | Jamaica | 13 | (3) |
- * Club domestic league appearances and goals as of 21:40, 7 April 2026 (UTC)

Andre Anthony Gray (born 26 June 1991) is a professional footballer who plays as a centre-forward. Born in England, he represented the Jamaica national team.

Gray moved from the Academy at hometown club Wolverhampton Wanderers to the Shrewsbury Town youth system at age 13. He turned professional there in 2009, and following loan spells in non-League football with AFC Telford United and Hinckley United, he joined Hinckley United permanently in June 2010. He scored 37 goals in 85 club appearances, winning a £30,000 move to Luton Town in May 2012. During the 2013–14 campaign, he was the top scorer in the Conference Premier, also being named on the Team of the Season as Luton secured a return to the English Football League as Conference champions. He was capped six times by England C during his time at Luton, scoring two goals. He was sold to Brentford of the Championship for an undisclosed fee in June 2014.

He was sold to Burnley for a club-record £6 million in August 2015. He was named the Championship Player of the Year for the 2015–16 season after he top-scored with 30 goals, winning a place on the Team of the Season as Burnley were promoted as champions. He scored 10 goals in 36 games in the following campaign, including a Premier League hat-trick, to help Burnley to avoid relegation with a 16th-place finish. He was sold to Watford for an undisclosed fee in August 2017. He played for Watford in the 2019 FA Cup final, though the club were relegated from the Premier League the following season. He spent the 2021–22 season on loan at Championship rivals Queens Park Rangers. He then had short stays with Aris (Greece), Al-Riyadh (Saudi Arabia), Plymouth Argyle, Fatih Karagümrük (Turkey), and Port Vale.

== Club career ==
=== Shrewsbury Town ===
Gray began his career in the academy at hometown club Wolverhampton Wanderers, but was released at age 13. He joined the youth system at League Two club Shrewsbury Town in 2004, signing his first professional one-year contract prior to the start of the 2009–10 season. Awarded the number 20 shirt by manager Paul Simpson, he made his debut on the opening day of the season, coming on as an 89th-minute substitute for Nathan Elder in a 3–1 win over Burton Albion. An injury crisis saw Gray make four further cameos, with what would be his final appearance for the club coming as a 57th-minute replacement for Kris Bright in a 2–0 Football League Trophy second round defeat to Accrington Stanley on 20 October. He spent periods of the 2009–10 season away on loan, but competition for places meant that Gray was relegated to the reserve team substitutes' bench.

On 26 November 2009, Gray joined Conference North club AFC Telford United on a one-month loan. His good form meant that his loan was extended for a second month. He scored his first goal for the club with a late winner against local rivals Stafford Rangers on Boxing Day. Competition for places meant that he gradually lost his place in the team, and he returned to Shrewsbury Town on 5 February 2010. He played six times for Telford, scoring once. He later departed the New Meadow at the end of his contract as one of five players released by managerless Shrewsbury. Looking back on his time at Shrewsbury, Gray said "I was at the stage in my life where I thought everything was set for me. I didn't really care about playing in Shrewsbury's reserves, which it shouldn't have been".

=== Hinckley United ===
On 5 March 2010, Gray joined Conference North club Hinckley United on an emergency one-month loan. He made five appearances and scored no goals for the club, before returning to Shrewsbury Town.

Gray returned to De Montfort Park in June 2010 and signed a permanent one-year contract with the club. His first goal for the club was a late equaliser in a 2–2 draw with Harrogate Town on 4 September. After two further goals that month in defeats to Guiseley and Eastwood Town, his goalscoring form dried up. His form returned in late March 2011, when he scored a brace in a 4–0 drubbing of Redditch United. He scored four goals in a 7–2 thrashing of Solihull Moors on 23 April, before ending the 2010–11 season having made 35 appearances and scored 14 goals.

Gray remained with Hinckley for the 2011–12 season and showed fine form, with his goalscoring exploits firing the Knitters to an FA Cup first round proper match versus Conference Premier club Tamworth on 12 November. He scored the opening goal in the 2–2 draw, but couldn't find the net in the replay, resulting in a 1–0 defeat. He also helped Hinckley reach the second round proper of the FA Trophy, scoring a late winner against Conference Premier club Wrexham in the first round, though he was unable to find the net against Luton Town in the following round, to whom they were defeated 3–0 in a replay. His exploits garnered him attention from Championship clubs. He made 45 appearances and scored 23 goals during the 2011–12 season. Gray departed Hinckley in the summer of 2012, having made 85 appearances and scored 37 goals across his two spells with the club. Gray looked back on his years playing part-time with Hinckley as the point at which he regained his focus, saying "as long as I still had a job and was getting paid, it was OK. Until I started playing and realised that full-time football was the only thing I wanted to do, it kicked me into gear. Being bored all day, waiting to go training, made me really want it".

=== Luton Town ===
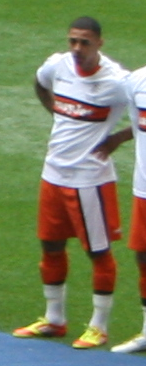
Gray lining up for Luton Town before the 2012 Conference Premier play-off final

On 22 March 2012, Gray signed for Conference Premier club Luton Town on loan until the end of the 2011–12 season with a view to a permanent move, having impressed the club's backroom staff with his performances against Luton in the FA Trophy. He arrived at the club at a turbulent time as manager Gary Brabin was sacked and his replacement, Paul Buckle, needed a run of results to qualify for the play-offs. Going straight into the starting lineup, he scored on his debut in a 1–1 draw with Grimsby Town on 24 March and hit a goal in each of his next matches against York City, Braintree Town and Hayes & Yeading United. This meant that Gray became the only player in Luton Town history to have scored in each of his first four matches for the club. He scored his fifth goal in a 2–0 win over champions Fleetwood Town in the last match of the season to secure Luton a fifth-place finish in the league and the last available remaining play-off spot. Gray scored the opening goal in the play-off semi-final first leg at home to Wrexham, which Luton won 3–2 on aggregate to set up a final against York City at Wembley Stadium. Luton lost the match 2–1, despite Gray scoring the opening goal after just 74 seconds. In total, he scored seven goals in 12 appearances during his loan spell.

The day after the play-off final defeat, Gray signed a two-year professional contract with Luton for a fee of £30,000. Beginning the 2012–13 season in a substitute role, he scored his first goal of the campaign in a 4–1 win over Macclesfield Town on 1 September as he broke back into the starting lineup. His performance in a 2–0 FA Cup fourth qualifying round victory over Cambridge United in late October saw him win the FA Cup Player of the Round award. On 1 December, he helped the Hatters into the third round proper of the FA Cup, scoring the opener in a 2–1 second round victory over Dorchester Town. Luton were drawn against Gray's hometown club Wolverhampton Wanderers in the third round and he played 89 minutes of the 1–0 giant killing on 5 January. On 14 January, following a run of ten matches in which he scored eight goals, Gray signed a new two-and-a-half-year contract, which would keep him at Kenilworth Road until June 2015. He played 75 minutes of Luton's shock 1–0 FA Cup fourth round giant killing of Norwich City on 26 January, but the Hatters' run was stopped by Millwall in the fifth round, who ran out 3–0 victors. He rounded out the 2012–13 season with a run of six goals in six matches, which included two braces in the Hatters' final two matches of the season. Gray made 54 appearances and scored 20 goals in a season which saw Luton finish two places outside the play-offs.

Gray was primarily used as an impact substitute during the beginning of the 2013–14 season, with new signing Mark Cullen preferred in a starting role by new Luton manager John Still. He scored his first goal of the season on 24 September, the club's eleventh league match, in a 4–0 victory over Woking. He then went on a goalscoring run and reclaimed his place in the team, scoring six goals in five matches, culminating with a hat-trick in a 4–1 victory over Hyde on 12 October. A run of 11 goals in 10 matches from November through to January helped the Hatters to the top of the Conference Premier table. Gray confirmed he had no intention of leaving the club midway through the season, stating that it would be "stupid" to with the club having a realistic chance of promotion back to the Football League and he instructed his agent to reject any approaches. After scoring a further seven goals in four matches in February, Gray was named as the Conference Premier Player of the Month. In total, Gray scored 30 goals in 45 appearances during the 2013–14 season, and won the first silverware of his career, as Luton were promoted back to the Football League as Conference Premier champions. He was recognised by the club for his performances by winning the Young Player of the Season award. He was the leading scorer in the Conference Premier (for which he won the league's Golden Boot award) and he was also named in the Conference Premier Team of the Season. He was the subject of reported transfer interest from League One neighbours Milton Keynes Dons in May 2014, but the Dons baulked at his £300,000 price tag. Gray departed the Hatters in late June 2014, having made 111 appearances and scored 57 goals during his time at Kenilworth Road.

=== Brentford ===
On 27 June 2014, Gray signed a three-year deal at Championship club Brentford for an undisclosed fee. It was later reported that the club had paid £600,000 for him. After joining, Gray said "the fact that the manager [Warburton] wanted me was a big part in selling me on Brentford. They had a vision of how they wanted me to play and also they have a vision for this club. As soon as Brentford came along I knew it was a good opportunity for me". Gray made his competitive debut for the club on the opening day of the 2014–15 season against Charlton Athletic, making the first Football League start of his career. He lasted 67 minutes of the 1–1 draw before being replaced by fellow new signing Nick Proschwitz. He scored his first competitive goal for the club in the following match, a 6–6 draw with Dagenham & Redbridge in the League Cup first round, which Brentford won 4–2 in a penalty shoot-out. He scored the first Football League goal of his career on the stroke of half-time in a 2–0 win over Rotherham United on 30 August.

After a long goalless run, Gray regained form in November, scoring five goals in four of five successive wins and receiving the Championship Player of the Month award. He also earned a place in the Football League Team of the Week for his goalscoring performances in wins over Nottingham Forest and Millwall in mid-November. His goal in a 3–2 win over Cardiff City on 20 December was the last of a run of seven goals in eight matches. A sparse goal return in the early months of 2015 saw manager Mark Warburton drop Gray to the bench in favour of Chris Long for the visit of Huddersfield Town to Griffin Park on 3 March. He quickly regained his starting berth and finished the regular season with four goals in his last 10 appearances, helping Brentford to fifth position and a matchup with Middlesbrough in the play-off semi-finals. He scored in the first leg, but a successful first full league season ended after a 5–1 aggregate defeat. Gray made 50 appearances and scored 18 goals during the 2014–15 season.

Amidst three transfer bids from Hull City, Gray's two goals in his first two appearances of the 2015–16 season prompted Brentford to offer him a new, improved contract, but he left the club on 21 August 2015. Gray finished his time at Griffin Park having scored 20 goals in 52 appearances and departed for a club-record fee. New Brentford manager Marinus Dijkhuizen was keen to keep him, but was relieved when the transfer saga was complete and he could focus on replacing him.

=== Burnley ===
On 21 August 2015, Gray joined Championship club Burnley on a three-year contract for an undisclosed fee – believed to be a club-record £6 million deal – double the previous record jointly held by George Boyd and Steven Fletcher. Gray signed on the eve of Brentford's Championship clash at Turf Moor but wasn't eligible to make his debut against his former club, having signed too late. His former club, Luton Town, revealed their financial windfall after the striker's transfer to Burnley. A club statement read: "We are guaranteed to receive a shade over £1.1 million from the fee which will be spread over three seasons; an initial figure approaching £300,000 followed by two of just over £400,000 each". On 29 August, Gray made his Burnley debut in a 2–1 away victory over Bristol City. He had turned down a move to Bristol City earlier in the month before signing with Burnley. He followed up his debut by scoring his first goal for the club in second half stoppage time to complete a 3–1 home win over Sheffield Wednesday two weeks later. Gray's goalscoring run of eight goals in eight matches during October and November helped Burnley keep pace with the league leaders. A further seven goals in nine matches from late December to early February, including a hat-trick in a 4–0 win over Bristol City increased his goalscoring tally to 15, as Burnley chased the automatic promotion positions in the Championship table. Gray scored eight goals in Burnley's remaining matches to help them reach the Championship summit, including one on the final day of the 2015–16 season as Burnley secured the Championship title after a 3–0 away win over Charlton Athletic. During this time, Gray was named Championship Player of the Year and won the Golden Boot award after finishing as Championship top scorer with 25 goals, including the two he scored in his appearances for Brentford.

Gray made his Premier League debut on the opening day of the 2016–17 season in a 1–0 home defeat to Swansea City. One week later, he followed up his Premier League debut by scoring his first Premier League goal in a 2–0 home win over Liverpool. He was supported by manager Sean Dyche after being suspended for historical offensive tweets. Gray scored his first Premier League hat-trick in a 4–1 victory over Sunderland on 31 December to become the first Burnley player to score a Premier League hat-trick and the first Burnley player to score a top flight hat-trick since Peter Noble in 1975. Gray finished the 2016–17 season with 36 appearances and 10 goals, helping Burnley to finish 16th in the Premier League.

=== Watford ===
On 9 August 2017, Gray signed for Premier League club Watford on a five-year contract for an undisclosed club record fee, after he rejected the offer of a new contract at Burnley, having entered the final year of his contract. Manager Marco Silva signed him to replace Troy Deeney, who he felt lacked pace. Gray made his debut for Watford three days later as a 63rd-minute substitute for Stefano Okaka in a 3–3 home draw with Liverpool and scored his first goal on 23 September in a 2–1 victory away to Swansea City. Gray finished his first season with five goals in 33 appearances, competing with Richarlison and Troy Deeney for a starting position. He stated his disappointment at a reduced amount of gametime as the season progressed. He was mainly a substitute under Javi Gracia, though earned praise from Gracia for scoring the winning goal over Crystal Palace in the FA Cup quarter-finals. Gray made 34 appearances and scored nine goals in 2018–19. He played in the 2019 FA Cup final defeat to Manchester City.

Gray continued to struggle for starts under Gracia's successor, Quique Sánchez Flores. He was also dropped by manager Nigel Pearson after breaking coronavirus lockdown rules during the 2019–20 relegation season. He was restored to the first XI by Xisco Muñoz, who tried to play him back into form. On 3 March, he scored both goals in a 2–0 win over Wycombe Wanderers at Vicarage Road, his first brace in four years.

He struggled with recurring hamstring injuries during the 2020–21 campaign, which head coach Vladimir Ivić blamed on a truncated pre-season due to the COVID-19 pandemic in England. He also was fined by Surrey Police for breaking lockdown rules and criticised for poor form on the pitch.

On 31 August 2021, Gray joined Championship club Queens Park Rangers on a season-long loan, having been signed by his former Brentford manager, Mark Warburton. He scored on his debut for QPR in a 3–3 draw with Reading on 11 September. His injury-time winning goal at Derby County on 29 November won him the EFL Championship Goal of the Month Award after the EFL described how he, with "his back to goal, controlled the ball, touched it on, then volleyed home in one beguiling blur". It was one of six goals nominated for the EFL Goal of the Season Award. He scored ten goals in 30 matches during his time at Loftus Road. Gray was released by Watford at the end of the 2021–22 season. He was linked with a move to Preston North End.

=== Later career ===
On 3 July 2022, Gray moved abroad for the first time in his career, signing a four-year contract with Super League Greece club Aris. He played under Alan Pardew, who replaced Apostolos Terzis as manager. He spent the 2022–23 season at the Kleanthis Vikelidis Stadium, scoring 13 goals in 39 games, including the Super League's Best Goal of matchweek 1.

On 7 September 2023, Gray joined Saudi Pro League side Al-Riyadh. The club battled against relegation, with his winning goal in a game against Al-Okhdood proving crucial in their survival after Odair Hellmann replaced Yannick Ferrera as manager. Gray said Saudi Arabia was "the place to be" and that criticism of the Saudi Pro League was based on ignorance. He scored seven goals in 26 league games during his time at the Al-Riyadh club stadium. He later spoke of his trouble finding a club in England after playing in Saudi Arabia, where he was paid a reported £100,000-a-week.

On 4 October 2024, Gray joined Plymouth Argyle on a three-month contract to provide cover for the injured Muhamed Tijani. Manager Wayne Rooney described him as "a striker of real quality". On 22 November, he scored a brace in a 2–2 draw with former club Watford at Home Park, earning himself a place on the EFL Team of the Week. In January 2025, he left the club following the expiration of his contract, having scored three goals in 13 Championship matches.

Following his departure from Plymouth, Gray moved to Turkey, joining then 1. Lig side Fatih Karagümrük on 13 January 2025. He helped Orhan Ak's side to secure promotion into the Süper Lig at the end of the 2024–25 season. He scored five goals in 27 games during his time at the Atatürk Olympic Stadium, departing midway through the 2025–26 Süper Lig campaign.

On 2 February 2026, Gray joined EFL League One's bottom club Port Vale on a deal to run until the end of the 2025–26 season. Manager Jon Brady explained that he returned to England to play for the club as he "wanted to come home first and foremost, misses his children and his partner and feels he has unfinished business in the EFL". Gray played 11 league games without scoring and looked short of fitness as the club fell to relegation. He was released upon the expiry of his contract.

== International career ==
Gray's goalscoring record for Luton in the final months of the 2011–12 season raised the attention of the England C team and he was named in the squad for an International Challenge Trophy match against Russia U23 in June 2012. He made his debut in a 4–0 defeat, playing the full 90 minutes. He was later called into the squad to face Belgium U23 in September 2012. He came on as a half-time substitute for Stephen Brogan and scored his first international goal with the winner in a 2–1 victory. The win saw England C qualify for the semi-final of the International Challenge Trophy. He played in the semi-final on 5 February 2013 against Turkey B, which England C lost 1–0. Gray captained England C in the second half of a 6–1 friendly win over Bermuda on 5 June 2013, scoring the team's sixth goal. Gray's return to the Football League in June 2014 meant that he was no longer eligible for England C. He made six appearances and scored two goals for the team. He targeted a call-up to the England senior team after joining Watford in August 2017.

In March 2021, Gray was one of six English-born players to receive their first call-up to the Jamaica national team. On 25 March 2021, he made his debut against the United States. He scored his first internationalgoal on 7 June in a 1–1 draw with Serbia in Japan. He was named in the squadlist for the 2021 CONCACAF Gold Cup after replacing the injured Javon East and played in the quarter-final defeat to the United States.

== Style of play ==
At his peak, Gray was a centre-forward described as having "raw pace and clinical finishing". Burnley manager Sean Dyche noted his tactical understanding and all-round game was improving to complement his natural goalscoring ability, pace and power.

== Personal life ==
Gray was born in Wolverhampton, West Midlands. He supported Wolverhampton Wanderers, before being drawn towards supporting Arsenal after seeing Thierry Henry play. He had been introduced to football by his grandfather and suffered grief at 13 years old when his grandfather died. Acting as a mentor and father figure for his younger half-brother Cody, Gray said "I know what my grandad wants me to do and that's look after my family. It's driving me to work harder". Gray has a four-inch (100 mm) scar on his left cheek having been stabbed in the face in Wolverhampton in a gang-related incident in 2011. He spoke in May 2015 of having started to grow out of the gang lifestyle around the time of the incident and credited his mother, close friends and Luton Town for turning his life around. In June 2018, he was cited by Las Vegas Police for allegedly hitting a woman in a Las Vegas nightclub, though was found not guilty of misdemeanour battery the following February after representation by Alan Jackson, with co-counsel Shawn Perez stating that it was "a foolish case and one that should never have been brought to trial"; Gray did not attend the trial. Gray joined an anti-knife crime protest in August 2019. He was fined by police for breaking lockdown rules by organising a poker night with friends during the 2020 COVID-19 lockdown. He had previously broke lockdown rules to meet with friends on his birthday.

In May 2016, Gray started dating Leigh-Anne Pinnock from the British girl group Little Mix. He appeared in the music video for the 2019 Little Mix single Think About Us. On 28 May 2020, he proposed to her and the couple got married on 3 June 2023 in Jamaica.

On 23 August 2016, Gray was charged with misconduct by the FA after a series of homophobic tweets he posted on Twitter in 2012 came to light. Four days later, it was reported that the FA were also investigating another tweet posted by Gray in 2014, which included a derogatory racial term. On 23 September, Gray was suspended for four matches and fined £25,000. He asked "for forgiveness", and said it was frustrating to be judged for his actions from four years previously when he was a "completely different person" who had been immature and involved with violent gangs. Pinnock later confronted him over the tweets in the 2021 documentary Leigh-Anne: Race, Pop & Power, and the couple announced they would set up the charity foundation, "The Black Fund", to support and empower Black communities. He was named on the 2022 Football Black List. Some of his tattoos include portraits of civil rights figures such as Nelson Mandela, Martin Luther King, Malcolm X, the Black Panthers, and Rosa Parks, as well as musician Bob Marley and boxer Muhammad Ali.

== Career statistics ==
=== Club ===
As of match played 7 April 2026

Appearances and goals by club, season and competition
| Club | Season | League | | | National cup (Note: Includes FA Cup, Greek Cup, King Cup, Turkish Cup) | | League cup (Note: Includes Football League Cup/EFL Cup) | | Other | | Total | |
| Club | Season | Division | Apps | Goals | Apps | Goals | Apps | Goals | Apps | Goals | Apps | Goals |
|---|---|---|---|---|---|---|---|---|---|---|---|---|
| Shrewsbury Town | 2009–10 | League Two | 4 | 0 | 0 | 0 | 0 | 0 | 1 (Note: Appearance in Football League Trophy / EFL Trophy) | 0 | 5 | 0 |
| AFC Telford United (loan) | 2009–10 | Conference North | 6 | 1 | — | | — | | — | | 6 | 1 |
| Hinckley United (loan) | 2009–10 | Conference North | 5 | 0 | — | | — | | — | | 5 | 0 |
| Hinckley United | 2010–11 | Conference North | 31 | 13 | 2 | 1 | — | | 2 (Note: Appearances in FA Trophy) | 0 | 35 | 14 |
| Hinckley United | 2011–12 | Conference North | 34 | 16 | 7 | 5 | — | | 4 | 2 | 45 | 23 |
| Hinckley United | Total | | 70 | 29 | 9 | 6 | — | | 6 | 2 | 85 | 37 |
| Luton Town (loan) | 2011–12 | Conference Premier | 9 | 5 | — | | — | | 3 (Note: Appearances in Conference Premier play-offs) | 2 | 12 | 7 |
| Luton Town | 2012–13 | Conference Premier | 44 | 17 | 7 | 2 | — | | 3 | 1 | 54 | 20 |
| Luton Town | 2013–14 | Conference Premier | 44 | 30 | 1 | 0 | — | | 0 | 0 | 45 | 30 |
| Luton Town | Total | | 97 | 52 | 8 | 2 | — | | 6 | 3 | 111 | 57 |
| Brentford | 2014–15 | Championship | 45 | 16 | 1 | 0 | 2 | 1 | 2 (Note: Appearances in Championship play-offs) | 1 | 50 | 18 |
| Brentford | 2015–16 | Championship | 2 | 2 | — | | 0 | 0 | — | | 2 | 2 |
| Brentford | Total | | 47 | 18 | 1 | 0 | 2 | 1 | 2 | 1 | 52 | 20 |
| Burnley | 2015–16 | Championship | 41 | 23 | 1 | 0 | 0 | 0 | — | | 42 | 23 |
| Burnley | 2016–17 | Premier League | 32 | 9 | 3 | 1 | 1 | 0 | — | | 36 | 10 |
| Burnley | Total | | 73 | 32 | 4 | 1 | 1 | 0 | — | | 78 | 33 |
| Watford | 2017–18 | Premier League | 31 | 5 | 1 | 0 | 1 | 0 | — | | 33 | 5 |
| Watford | 2018–19 | Premier League | 29 | 7 | 5 | 2 | 0 | 0 | — | | 34 | 9 |
| Watford | 2019–20 | Premier League | 23 | 2 | 2 | 0 | 2 | 0 | — | | 27 | 2 |
| Watford | 2020–21 | Championship | 30 | 5 | 1 | 0 | 0 | 0 | — | | 31 | 5 |
| Watford | Total | | 113 | 19 | 9 | 2 | 3 | 0 | — | | 126 | 21 |
| Queens Park Rangers (loan) | 2021–22 | Championship | 28 | 10 | 1 | 0 | 1 | 0 | — | | 30 | 10 |
| Aris | 2022–23 | Super League Greece | 32 | 8 | 3 | 0 | — | | 4 (Note: Appearances in UEFA Europa Conference League) | 5 | 39 | 13 |
| Al-Riyadh | 2023–24 | Saudi Pro League | 26 | 7 | 1 | 0 | — | | — | | 27 | 7 |
| Plymouth Argyle | 2024–25 | Championship | 13 | 3 | 0 | 0 | 0 | 0 | — | | 13 | 3 |
| Fatih Karagümrük | 2024–25 | TFF 1. Lig | 12 | 2 | 1 | 0 | — | | — | | 13 | 2 |
| Fatih Karagümrük | 2025–26 | Süper Lig | 12 | 0 | 2 | 3 | — | | — | | 14 | 3 |
| Fatih Karagümrük | Total | | 24 | 2 | 3 | 3 | 0 | 0 | 0 | 0 | 27 | 5 |
| Port Vale | 2025–26 | League One | 11 | 0 | 3 | 0 | — | | 1 | 0 | 15 | 0 |
| Career total | | | 544 | 181 | 42 | 14 | 7 | 1 | 20 | 11 | 614 | 207 |

=== International ===
Appearances and goals by national team and year
| National team | Year | Apps | Goals |
|---|---|---|---|
| Jamaica | 2021 | 7 | 1 |
| Jamaica | 2022 | 6 | 2 |
| Total | | 13 | 3 |

Scores and results list Jamaica's goal tally first, score column indicates score after each Gray goal

List of international goals scored by Andre Gray
| No. | Date | Venue | Cap | Opponent | Score | Result | Competition | Ref. |
|---|---|---|---|---|---|---|---|---|
| 1 | 7 June 2021 | Miki Athletic Stadium, Miki, Japan | 2 | Serbia | 1–0 | 1–1 | Friendly | |
| 2 | 30 January 2022 | Estadio Rommel Fernández, Panama City, Panama | 9 | Panama | 2–3 | 2–3 | 2022 FIFA World Cup qualification | |
| 3 | 24 March 2022 | Independence Park, Kingston, Jamaica | 11 | El Salvador | 1–1 | 1–1 | 2022 FIFA World Cup qualification | |

== Honours ==
Luton Town

- Conference Premier: 2013–14

Burnley

- Football League Championship: 2015–16

Watford

- FA Cup runner-up: 2018–19

Individual

- Conference Premier Player of the Month: February 2014
- Luton Town Young Player of the Season: 2013–14
- Conference Premier Golden Boot: 2013–14
- Conference Premier Team of the Season: 2013–14
- Football League Championship Player of the Month: November 2014
- Football League Championship Player of the Year: 2015–16
- Football League Team of the Season: 2015–16
- Football League Championship Golden Boot: 2015–16
- PFA Team of the Year: 2015–16 Championship
- EFL Championship Goal of the Month: November 2021
