= João Camacho =

Portuguese footballer

Personal information
- Full name: João Pedro Gomes Camacho
- Date of birth: 23 June 1994 (age 32)
- Place of birth: Funchal, Portugal
- Height: 1.71 m (5 ft 7 1/2 in)
- Position: Winger

Youth career
- 2004–2007: União Madeira
- 2007–2013: Nacional

Senior career*
Years	Team	Apps	(Gls)
2013−2022	Nacional	163	(30)
2016	→ Compostela (loan)	6	(0)
2016−2017	→ Celta B (loan)	23	(3)
2022−2024	Moreirense	60	(8)
2024−2026	Fatih Karagümrük	44	(5)
- * Club domestic league appearances and goals as of 16 May 2026

João Pedro Gomes Camacho (born 23 June 1994) is a Portuguese professional footballer who plays as a right winger.

== Club career ==
=== Nacional ===
Born in Funchal, Madeira, Camacho joined local C.D. Nacional's youth system in 2007 at the age of 13, from neighbouring C.F. União. He made his debut in the Primeira Liga on 12 April 2014, coming on as a late substitute in a 2−0 home win against C.S. Marítimo.

Camacho was rarely played over the course of three top-flight seasons, and in late January 2016 he was loaned to Spanish Segunda División B club SD Compostela. In the following summer he joined another third-tier team, Celta de Vigo B, also on loan.

Camacho scored his first goal in the Portuguese main division on 26 August 2018, from a penalty kick in the 2−1 away victory over Vitória de Setúbal. He totalled seven for the campaign, but suffered relegation as second-bottom.

=== Moreirense ===
On 24 July 2022, Camacho signed a one-year contract with Liga Portugal 2 side Moreirense FC. In June 2023, having contributed four goals from 31 appearances to their promotion (38 in all competitions), he agreed to a one-year extension.

== Career statistics ==
As of match played 30 November 2025

Appearances and goals by club, season and competition
Club	Season	League			National cup		League cup		Total	
Club	Season	Division	Apps	Goals	Apps	Goals	Apps	Goals	Apps	Goals
Nacional	2013–14	Primeira Liga	3	0	0	0	1	0	4	0
Nacional	2014–15	Primeira Liga	9	0	3	0	3	0	15	0
Nacional	2015–16	Primeira Liga	6	0	0	0	4	0	10	0
Nacional	2017–18	LigaPro	36	6	2	1	1	0	39	7
Nacional	2018–19	Primeira Liga	26	7	0	0	2	0	28	7
Nacional	2019–20	LigaPro	23	6	0	0	1	0	24	6
Nacional	2020–21	Primeira Liga	28	3	1	0	—		29	3
Nacional	2021–22	Liga Portugal 2	32	8	2	0			34	8
Nacional	Total		163	30	8	1	12	0	183	31
Compostela (loan)	2015–16	Segunda División B	6	0	0	0	—		6	0
Celta B (loan)	2016–17	Segunda División B	23	3	—		—		23	3
Moreirense	2022–23	Liga Portugal 2	31	4	3	0	4	0	38	4
Moreirense	2023–24	Primeira Liga	29	4	1	0	1	0	31	4
Moreirense	Total		60	8	4	0	5	0	69	8
Fatih Karagümrük	2024–25	TFF 1. Lig	37	5	1	0	—		0	0
Fatih Karagümrük	2025–26	Süper Lig	8	0	0	0	—		0	0
Fatih Karagümrük	Total		45	5	1	0	—		46	5
Career total			297	46	13	1	17	0	327	47

== Honours ==
Nacional

- LigaPro: 2017–18

Moreirense

- Liga Portugal 2: 2022–23
