= İskenderunspor (1978) =

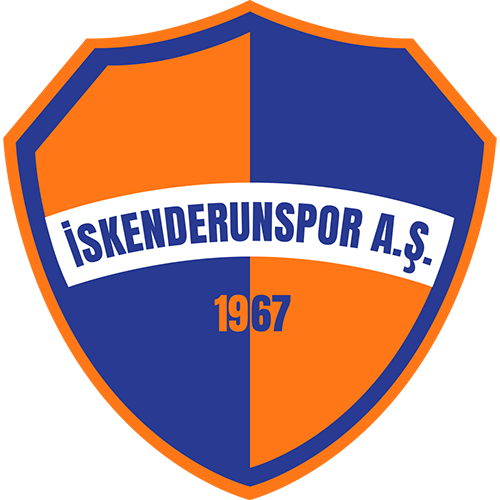
- Full name: İskenderunspor Sportif Faaliyetler Anonim Şirketi
- Founded: 1978
- Ground: İskenderun 5 Temmuz Stadium
- Capacity: 8,217
- Chairman: Şaban Hakan Bolat
- Manager: Koray Palaz
- League: TFF 2. Lig
- 2025–26: TFF 2. Lig, White, 8th of 19
Home colours	Away colours

İskenderunspor, formerly known as Erzinspor, Erzin Belediyespor and İskenderun FK, is a football club based in İskenderun, Turkey. The club was founded in 1978 as Erzinspor in Erzin. İskenderunspor competes in the TFF Second League.

The club were promoted to the TFF Third League after the 2013–14 season by defeating 44 Malatyaspor in the playoffs, after they finished 1st in the 3rd group of the Turkish Regional Amateur League. The team was bought by Şaban Hakan Bolat during the season, and in 2021, İskenderunspor A.Ş. took its name and went to restructuring. For the restructuring, Ümit Karan was appointed as the manager and Jan Olde Riekerink was appointed as the general manager of the club.However, 23/24 season has seen a manager change and it is the one time Tottenham youth coach Koray Palaz at the helm.

== League participations ==
- TFF Second League: 2022–present
- TFF Third League: 2014–2022
- Turkish Regional Amateur League: 2010–2014

== League performances ==
Season	League	Pos	Pld	W	D	L	PF	PA	Pts
2010–11	Turkish Regional Amateur League – 5th Group	7	22	7	5	10	28	35	26
2011–12	Turkish Regional Amateur League – 5th Group	3	22	12	5	5	34	14	41
2012–13	Turkish Regional Amateur League – 4th Group	5	28	13	9	6	49	27	48
2013–14	Turkish Regional Amateur League – 3rd Group	1	28	20	6	2	60	18	66
	Turkish Regional Amateur League – Playoffs	Winner	1	1	0	0	3	1	3
2014–15	TFF Third League – 3rd Group	10	34	11	9	14	41	47	42
2015–16	TFF Third League – 1st Group	6	35	15	10	10	52	37	55
2016–17	TFF Third League – 1st Group	12	36	12	9	15	43	53	45

Promotion
Relegation

Source: TFF: Erzin Belediyespor

== Current squad ==
As of 4 December 2025

Note: Flags indicate national team as defined under FIFA eligibility rules; some limited exceptions apply. Players may hold more than one non-FIFA nationality.

No.	Pos.	Nation	Player
1	GK	TUR	Emircan Seçgin
3	DF	TUR	Ahmet Biler
4	DF	TUR	Ulaş Zengin
5	DF	NED	Sinan Özen
6	MF	TUR	Ulaş Yılmaz
7	FW	TUR	Erdem Can Polat
8	MF	TUR	Berat Yılmaz (on loan from Galatasaray)
9	FW	TUR	Enes Şahin
10	MF	TUR	Kerem Kurşun
11	DF	TUR	Birkan Öksüz
16	MF	TUR	Berkay Güverçinci
17	FW	FRA	Deniz Erdoğan
18	FW	FRA	Kemal Sarigöl
19	MF	TUR	Mustafa Kapı
20	DF	ENG	Huseyin Biler

No.	Pos.	Nation	Player
22	DF	TUR	Koray Uzun
24	GK	TUR	Muhammet Eren Kazancı
26	MF	NED	Muhammed Özkan
28	MF	TUR	Baran Aksaka
31	DF	TUR	Erbay Eker
37	DF	TUR	Ömer Gür
41	GK	TUR	Cengizhan Şarli
47	FW	TUR	Mohamed Khalil
66	MF	FRA	Ozkan Cetiner
77	FW	TUR	İsmail Yaşar
97	FW	TUR	Sevan Albay
99	FW	TUR	Efe Geçili
—	DF	TUR	Hüseyin İçlek
—	MF	TUR	Emre Topçu
