= Thomas Hooyberghs =

Belgian footballer

Personal information
- Date of birth: July 26, 1996 (age 30)
- Place of birth: Arendonk, Belgium
- Position: Goalkeeper

Team information
- Current team: KFC De Kempen

Youth career
- KFC Verbroedering Arendonk
- Dessel Sport
- 2006−2015: PSV Eindhoven
- 2015−2017: Club Brugge

Senior career*
Years	Team	Apps	(Gls)
2017−2018	FC Eindhoven	15	(0)
2018−2019	vv DBS		
2019	Witgoor Sport		
2020	vv DBS		
2020–	KFC De Kempen		

International career
2013–2014	Belgium U18	6	(0)
2014	Belgium U19	3	(0)
- * Club domestic league appearances and goals as of 16 October 2017

Thomas Hooyberghs (born July 26, 1996) is a professional footballer who plays for KFC De Kempen as a goalkeeper.

== Career ==
=== Club career ===
Ahead of the 2019–20 season, Hooyberghs returned to Belgium and joined KFC Witgoor Sport Dessel. After half a season at Witgoor, he moved back to vv DBS in January 2020.

In April 2020 it was confirmed, that Hooyberghs would play for Belgian club KFC De Kempen from the upcoming season.
