= Nicolas Mohr =

Austrian footballer

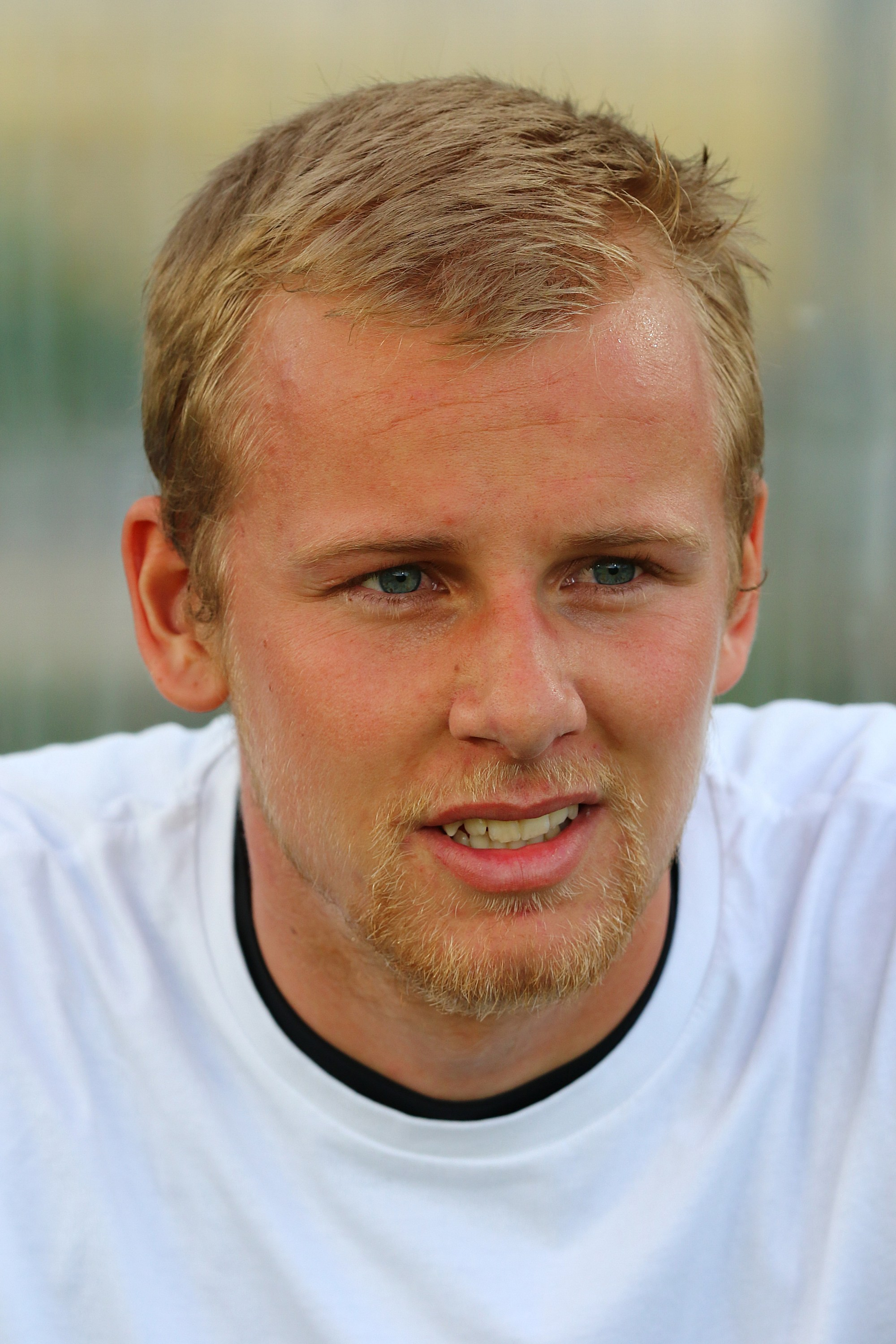
- Mohr in 2018

Personal information
- Date of birth: 1 May 1996 (age 30)
- Place of birth: Austria
- Height: 1.82 m (5 ft 11 1/2 in)
- Position: Goalkeeper

Team information
- Current team: FC Lauterach
- Number: 22

Youth career
- 2003–2010: FC Wolfurt
- 2010–2013: AKA Vorarlberg

Senior career*
| Years | Team | Apps | (Gls) |
| 2013–2014 | FC Lustenau 07 | 0 | (0) |
| 2014–2019 | Austria Lustenau II | 83 | (0) |
| 2015–2019 | Austria Lustenau | 24 | (0) |
| 2020– | FC Lauterach | 0 | (0) |
- * Club domestic league appearances and goals as of 00:22, 25 July 2019 (UTC)

Nicolas Mohr (born 1 May 1996) is an Austrian footballer who currently plays as a goalkeeper for Austrian Regionalliga club FC Lauterach.
