= Birkan Öksüz =

Turkish footballer (born 1996)

Personal information
- Date of birth: 19 March 1996 (age 30)
- Place of birth: İskenderun, Turkey
- Height: 1.76 m (5 ft 9 in)
- Position: Leftback

Team information
- Current team: İskenderunspor
- Number: 11

Youth career
- 2006–2012: Karaağaçspor
- 2012–2016: Antalyaspor

Senior career*
Years	Team	Apps	(Gls)
2016–2019	Antalyaspor	4	(0)
2017	→ Tuzlaspor (loan)	2	(0)
2017–2018	→ Kemerspor (loan)	26	(0)
2019–2021	Kastamonuspor 1966	44	(3)
2021–2022	Kahramanmaraşspor	23	(1)
2022–2023	Manavgat Belediyespor		
2023–2024	Bornova 1877 SY	20	(0)
2024–2025	Osmaniyespor FK	24	(2)
2025–	İskenderunspor	4	(0)
- * Club domestic league appearances and goals as of 26 November 2025

Birkan Öksüz (born 19 March 1996) is a Turkish professional footballer who plays as a left back for TFF 2. Lig club İskenderunspor.

== Professional career ==
Öksüz is a youth product of Antalyaspor, and made his league debut with them in a 2-1 Süper Lig loss to İstanbul Başakşehir F.K. on 17 January 2016.
