= Marius Trésor Doh =

Footballer (born 2003)

Personal information
- Full name: Marius Trésor Doh
- Date of birth: 17 December 2003 (age 22)
- Place of birth: Lopou, Ivory Coast
- Height: 1.77 m (5 ft 10 in)
- Position: Defensive midfielder

Team information
- Current team: Fatih Karagümrük
- Number: 14

Youth career
- 2016–2019: ASFA
- 2019: USC Bassam
- 2023–2024: Fenerbahçe Academy

Senior career*
Years	Team	Apps	(Gls)
2019–2021	USC Bassam	42	(1)
2021–2023	LYS Sassandra	54	(0)
2024–2025	Fenerbahçe	0	(0)
2024–2025	→ Fatih Karagümrük (loan)	20	(1)
2025–	Fatih Karagümrük	38	(1)
2026	→ Iğdır (loan)	4	(0)
- * Club domestic league appearances and goals as of 19 October 2026

Marius Trésor Doh (born 17 December 2003) is an Ivorian professional footballer who plays as a defensive midfielder for Turkish TFF 1. Lig club Fatih Karagümrük.

== Club career ==
=== Early career ===
Born in Lopou in the Grands-Ponts Region, Lagunes District in southern Ivory Coast and raised in Yopougon and Abobo (in Abidjan) and also in Bangolo. He started to play football with USC Bassam then played for LYS Sassandra before transferred to abroad.

=== Fenerbahçe ===
On 22 February 2023, he joined to Fenerbahçe Academy. On 8 August 2024, he signed three years professional contract with Turkish Süper Lig club Fenerbahçe.

==== Karagümrük (loan) ====
On 9 August 2024, he loaned to TFF First League club Fatih Karagümrük until the end of season. On 11 August 2024, he made his debut with the team against Amedspor in a 0–0 draw.

== Honours ==
- Coupe de la Ligue de Côte d'Ivoire: 2020
