= Quentin Martin =

French footballer (born 1996)

Personal information
- Date of birth: 7 March 1996 (age 30)
- Place of birth: France
- Height: 1.73 m (5 ft 8 in)
- Position: Defender

Team information
- Current team: FC Albères Argelès

Senior career*
Years	Team	Apps	(Gls)
2014–2016	Béziers	24	(1)
2016–2019	Bourg-Péronnas	38	(2)
2020–2021	Canet Roussillon	6	(0)
2021–2023	Villefranche	22	(1)
2023–2024	Bourg-Péronnas	3	(0)
2024–	FC Albères Argelès	0	(0)
- * Club domestic league appearances and goals as of 27 January 2024

Quentin Martin (born 7 March 1996) is a French professional footballer who plays as a defender for Championnat National 3 club FC Albères Argelès.

== Club career ==
On 25 June 2021, he joined Villefranche.
