= Rannick Schoop =

Curaçoan footballer

Personal information
- Date of birth: 25 September 1996 (age 30)
- Place of birth: Willemstad, Netherlands Antilles
- Position: Right-back

Team information
- Current team

Youth career
- Heerenveense Boys
- 2007–2014: Heerenveen

Senior career*
Years	Team	Apps	(Gls)
2014–2017	Jong Heerenveen	39	(5)
2017–2018	De Graafschap	4	(0)
2017–2018	→ Jong De Graafschap	17	(0)
2019	Jong Heerenveen	9	(0)
2019–2020	ONS Sneek		
- * Club domestic league appearances and goals as of 15 April 2019

Rannick Schoop (born 25 September 1996) is a Curaçoan professional footballer who plays as a right-back.

== Career ==
Schoop played youth football at SC Heerenveen and had been playing for the club's reserves when he joined Jong De Graafschap on trial in August 2017. In November he signed a contract until the end of the season and made his professional debut against AZ Alkmaar, coming on as a substitute.

In January 2019, Schoop returned to SC Heerenveen, signing for the reserve team of the club. In the summer, he then joined ONS Sneek.
