= Barış Kalaycı =

Turkish footballer (born 2005)

Personal information
- Full name: Barış Jakob Kalaycı
- Date of birth: 30 August 2005 (age 21)
- Place of birth: Berlin, Germany
- Height: 1.75 m (5 ft 9 in)
- Position: Attacking midfielder

Team information
- Current team: Fatih Karagümrük
- Number: 7

Youth career
- 2011–2013: Blau-Weiß 1890 Berlin
- 2013-2019: BFC Dynamo
- 2019–2024: Union Berlin

Senior career*
Years	Team	Apps	(Gls)
2024–	Fatih Karagümrük	35	(1)

International career^{‡}
2022–2024	Turkey U19	2	(0)
2025–	Turkey U21	1	(0)
- * Club domestic league appearances and goals as of 10 June 2026 ‡ National team caps and goals as of 02:53, 26 October 2025 (UTC)

Barış Jakob Kalaycı (born 30 August 2005) is a professional footballer who plays as an attacking midfielder for TFF 1. Lig club Fatih Karagümrük. Born in Germany, he is a youth international for Turkey.

== Club career ==
Kalaycı is a product of the youth academies of the German clubs BFC Dynamo and Union Berlin. On 8 February 2024, he signed his first contract with Union Berlin. On 30 August 2024, he moved to the Süper Lig club Fatih Karagümrük. He made his senior and professional debut with Fatih Karagümrük in a 3–0 Turkish Cup win over Sarıyer on 4 December 2024. On 21 July 2025, he extended his contract with Fatih Karagümrük until 2029.

== International career ==
Born in Germany, Kalaycı is of Turkish descent. In October 2025, he was called up to the Turkey U21s for a set of 2027 UEFA European Under-21 Championship qualification matches. In March 2026 while he was in the Turkey U21s camp, Kalaycı received an emergency call-up to the Turkey senior squad for the training squad against Romania.
