= Gulfran Támara =

Colombian footballer (born 1996)

Personal information
- Full name: Gulfran Eduardo Támara Figueroa
- Date of birth: 2 February 1996 (age 30)
- Place of birth: Barranquilla, Colombia
- Height: 1.80 m (5 ft 11 in)
- Position: Centre back

Team information
- Current team: Destroyers
- Number: 3

Senior career*
Years	Team	Apps	(Gls)
2014–2018	Junior	11	(0)
2014–2015	→ Barranquilla (loan)	39	(1)
2018	→ Barranquilla (loan)	2	(0)
2018–	Destroyers	12	(0)
- * Club domestic league appearances and goals as of 16 December 2018

Gulfran Támara (born 2 February 1996) is a Colombian footballer who plays as a central defender for Bolivian club Destroyers.
