= List of EFL League One hat-tricks =

EFL League One was created in 2004 after a renaming of the lower leagues in English football. Since the start of the newly re-branded league many players have scored a hat-trick. Hector Sam then playing for Wrexham has the distinction of being the first player to accomplish this on 10 August 2004.

The list includes only hat-tricks scored in the league; hat-tricks scored in play-off matches are not counted.

== Hat-tricks ==
Key
^{5}	Player scored five goals
^{4}	Player scored four goals
*	Home team

Note: The results column shows the home team score first

Player	Nationality	For	Against	Result	Date	Ref
Hector Sam	Trinidad and Tobago	Wrexham	Oldham Athletic*	2–3	10 August 2004	
Pawel Abbott	Poland	Huddersfield Town	Port Vale*	0–3	11 September 2004	
Anthony Sweeney	England	Hartlepool United*	Chesterfield	3–2	16 October 2004	
Steve Howard	Scotland	Luton Town	MK Dons*	1–4	20 November 2004	
Keigan Parker	Scotland	Blackpool*	Torquay United	4–0	7 December 2004	
Michael Chopra	England	Barnsley*	Peterborough United	4–0	18 December 2004	
Stuart Elliott	Northern Ireland	Hull City*	Tranmere Rovers	6–1	18 December 2004	
Steve MacLean	Scotland	Sheffield Wednesday	Doncaster Rovers*	0–4	19 December 2004	
Leon Constantine	England	Torquay United	Brentford*	1–3	26 December 2004	
Steve Fletcher	England	Bournemouth*	Brentford	3–2	1 January 2005	
Michael Chopra	England	Barnsley*	Huddersfield Town	4–2	15 January 2005	
Juan Ugarte^{4}	Spain	Wrexham	Chesterfield*	2–4	22 January 2005	
Matty Fryatt	England	Walsall*	Huddersfield Town	4–3	29 January 2005	
Juan Ugarte^{5}	Spain	Wrexham	Hartlepool United*	4–6	5 March 2005	
Warren Feeney	Northern Ireland	Stockport County	Huddersfield Town*	3–5	19 March 2005	
Sam Parkin	Scotland	Swindon Town*	Wrexham	4–2	19 March 2005	
Leroy Lita	Democratic Republic of the Congo	Bristol City	Torquay United*	0–4	19 March 2005	
Adam Boyd	England	Hartlepool United*	Sheffield Wednesday	3–0	15 April 2005	
Julian Joachim	England	Walsall*	Hull City	3–0	23 April 2005	
Dean Windass	England	Bradford City*	Bournemouth	4–2	30 April 2005	
Juan Ugarte	Spain	Wrexham	Stockport County*	1–4	30 April 2005	
Deon Burton	Jamaica	Rotherham United*	Blackpool	4–0	27 August 2005	
Kevin McLeod	England	Swansea City*	Bristol City	7–1	10 September 2005	
Freddy Eastwood	Wales	Southend United	Bristol City*	0–3	29 October 2005	
Lee Trundle	England	Swansea City*	Chesterfield	5–1	29 October 2005	
Chris Porter	England	Oldham Athletic	Brentford*	3–3	19 November 2005	
Paul Hall	Jamaica	Chesterfield	Bristol City*	2–4	19 November 2005	
James Hayter	England	Bournemouth	Blackpool*	1–3	6 December 2005	
Chris Greenacre	England	Tranmere Rovers*	Yeovil Town	4–1	28 December 2005	
Leon Knight	England	Swansea City*	MK Dons	3–1	10 January 2006	
Freddy Eastwood	Wales	Southend United	Chesterfield*	3–4	18 February 2006	
Nicky Southall	England	Nottingham Forest*	Swindon Town	7–1	25 February 2006	
Arron Davies	Wales	Yeovil Town	Chesterfield*	0–3	4 March 2006	
Andy Booth	England	Huddersfield Town*	Rotherham United	4–1	18 March 2006	
Luke Beckett	England	Oldham Athletic*	Blackpool	3–1	25 March 2006	
Dean Windass	England	Bradford City*	Scunthorpe United	4–2	1 April 2006	
Leon Knight	England	Swansea City	Chesterfield*	0–4	6 May 2006	
Matt Lockwood	England	Leyton Orient*	Gillingham	3–3	26 September 2006	
Ryan Lowe	England	Crewe Alexandra*	Carlisle	5–1	30 September 2006	
Jake Robinson	England	Brighton & Hove Albion	Huddersfield Town*	0–3	28 October 2006	
Nathan Tyson	England	Nottingham Forest	Crewe Alexandra*	1–4	9 December 2006	
Darren Byfield	Jamaica	Millwall*	Gillingham	4–1	1 January 2007	
Darren Anderton	England	Bournemouth*	Leyton Orient	5–0	10 February 2007	
Ryan Jarvis	England	Leyton Orient	Millwall*	2–5	20 February 2007	
Akpo Sodje^{4}	England	Port Vale	Rotherham United*	1–5	10 March 2007	
Andy Morrell^{4}	England	Blackpool	Swansea City*	3–6	5 May 2007	
Craig Curran	England	Tranmere Rovers*	Brentford	3–1	5 May 2007	
Junior Agogo	Ghana	Nottingham Forest*	Gillingham	4–0	22 September 2007	
Billy Paynter	England	Swindon Town*	Bournemouth	4–1	22 September 2007	
Kris Commons	Scotland	Nottingham Forest	Cheltenham Town*	0–3	13 October 2007	
Lee Hughes	England	Oldham Athletic	Millwall*	2–3	15 December 2007	
Gary Alexander	England	Millwall*	Brighton & Hove Albion	3–0	26 December 2007	
Alex Revell	England	Brighton & Hove Albion*	Bournemouth	3–2	1 January 2008	
Nicky Maynard	England	Crewe Alexandra*	Cheltenham Town	3–1	19 April 2008	
Guillem Bauza	Spain	Swansea City*	Leyton Orient	4–1	26 April 2008	
Lee Hughes	England	Oldham Athletic*	Cheltenham Town	4–0	23 August 2008	
Danny Graham	England	Carlisle United*	Yeovil Town	4–1	30 August 2008	
Ishmel Demontagnac	England	Walsall*	Southend United	5–2	30 August 2008	
Craig Mackail-Smith	Scotland	Peterborough United*	Bristol Rovers	5–4	6 September 2008	
Gary Hooper	England	Scunthorpe United	Brighton & Hove Albion*	1–4	6 September 2008	
Simon Cox	Republic of Ireland	Swindon Town	Hartlepool United*	3–3	3 October 2008	
Joel Porter	Australia	Hartlepool United*	Swindon Town	3–3	3 October 2008	
Glenn Murray	England	Brighton & Hove Albion*	Cheltenham Town	3–3	4 October 2008	
Rickie Lambert^{4}	England	Bristol Rovers*	Southend United	4–2	25 October 2008	
Lewis Alessandra	England	Oldham Athletic*	Scunthorpe United	3–0	28 October 2008	
Simon Cox	Republic of Ireland	Swindon Town	Scunthorpe United*	3–3	1 November 2008	
Matty Fryatt	England	Leicester City*	Southend United	3–0	6 December 2008	
Craig Davies	Wales	Stockport County*	Bristol Rovers	3–1	20 December 2008	
Steve Guinan	England	Hereford United*	Oldham Athletic	5–0	17 January 2009	
Billy Clarke	Republic of Ireland	Northampton Town*	Crewe Alexandra	5–1	24 January 2009	
Aaron Wilbraham	England	MK Dons	Cheltenham Town*	5–3	31 January 2009	
Damian Spencer	England	Cheltenham Town*	MK Dons	3–5	31 January 2009	
Jermaine Beckford	Jamaica	Leeds United*	Yeovil Town	4–0	10 March 2009	
Rickie Lambert	England	Bristol Rovers	Hereford United*	0–3	10 March 2009	
Neil Harris	England	Millwall	Hartlepool United*	2–3	21 March 2009	
Simon Cox	Republic of Ireland	Swindon Town	Northampton Town*	3–4	24 March 2009	
Simeon Jackson	Canada	Gillingham*	Swindon Town	5–0	8 August 2009	
Carl Baker	England	Stockport County	Brighton & Hove Albion*	2–4	22 August 2009	
Lee Barnard	England	Southend United*	Leyton Orient	3–0	4 September 2009	
James Henry	England	Millwall*	Tranmere Rovers	5–0	3 October 2009	
Jordan Rhodes	Scotland	Huddersfield Town*	Exeter City	4–0	10 October 2009	
Neil Harris	England	Millwall	Stockport County*	0–4	17 October 2009	
Glenn Murray^{4}	England	Brighton & Hove Albion	Wycombe Wanderers*	2–5	28 December 2009	
Roy O'Donovan	Republic of Ireland	Hartlepool United*	Southend United	3–0	6 March 2010	
Rickie Lambert	England	Southampton	MK Dons*	0–3	20 March 2010	
Brett Pitman	England	Bournemouth*	Peterborough United	5–1	14 August 2010	
Jeff Hughes	Northern Ireland	Bristol Rovers	Dagenham & Redbridge*	0–3	18 September 2010	
Gary Madine	England	Carlisle United	Hartlepool United*	0–4	28 September 2010	
Josh McQuoid	Northern Ireland	Bournemouth*	Walsall	3–0	13 November 2010	
Neil Mellor	England	Sheffield Wednesday	MK Dons*	1–4	20 November 2010	
Glenn Murray	England	Brighton & Hove Albion*	Leyton Orient	5–0	1 January 2011	
Sam Baldock	England	MK Dons	Colchester United*	1–3	12 March 2011	
Shaun MacDonald	Wales	Yeovil Town	Leyton Orient*	1–5	26 March 2011	
Sam Baldock	England	MK Dons*	Chesterfield	6–2	20 August 2011	
Leon Clarke	England	Chesterfield*	Carlisle United	4–1	17 September 2011	
Jordan Rhodes	Scotland	Huddersfield Town	Exeter City*	0–4	15 October 2011	
Jordan Rhodes	Scotland	Huddersfield Town*	Preston North End	3–1	22 October 2011	
Robbie Simpson	England	Oldham Athletic*	Chesterfield	5–2	19 November 2011	
Jordan Rhodes^{4}	Scotland	Huddersfield Town	Sheffield Wednesday*	4–4	17 December 2011	
Marcello Trotta	Italy	Wycombe Wanderers*	Exeter City	3–1	26 December 2011	
Jordan Rhodes^{5}	Scotland	Huddersfield Town	Wycombe Wanderers*	0–6	6 January 2012	
Gary Alexander	England	Brentford*	Wycombe Wanderers	5–2	28 January 2012	
Bradley Wright-Phillips	England	Charlton Athletic	Chesterfield*	0–4	28 February 2012	
Jonathan Forte	Barbados	Notts County	Charlton Athletic*	2–4	10 March 2012	
Stuart Beavon	England	Wycombe Wanderers	Bury*	1–4	17 March 2012	
Michael Symes	England	Rochdale*	Oldham Athletic	3–2	17 March 2012	
Ched Evans	Wales	Sheffield United*	Chesterfield	4–1	28 March 2012	
Jordan Rhodes	Scotland	Huddersfield Town	Leyton Orient*	1–3	3 April 2012	
Lloyd Sam	Ghana	Notts County*	Yeovil Town	3–1	9 April 2012	
Andy Robinson	England	Tranmere Rovers	Carlisle United*	0–3	21 August 2012	
Jake Cassidy	Wales	Tranmere Rovers*	Colchester United	4–0	1 September 2012	
Dean Bowditch	England	MK Dons	Bury*	1–4	22 September 2012	
Nicky Wroe	England	Preston North End	Scunthorpe United*	2–3	23 October 2012	
Lewis Grabban	England	Bournemouth*	Oldham Athletic	4–1	17 November 2012	
James Collins^{4}	Republic of Ireland	Swindon Town*	Portsmouth	5–0	1 January 2013	
Brett Pitman	England	Bournemouth*	Crewe Alexandra	3–1	26 January 2013	
Will Grigg	Northern Ireland	Walsall	Carlisle United*	0–3	26 February 2013	
Dani Lopez	Spain	Stevenage*	Sheffield United	4–0	16 March 2013	
Tom Eaves	England	Shrewsbury Town*	Crawley Town	3–0	1 April 2013	
Ryan Mason	England	Swindon Town*	Crewe Alexandra	5–0	31 August 2013	
Jay Emmanuel-Thomas	England	Bristol City	Carlisle United*	2–4	26 October 2013	
Nahki Wells	Bermuda	Bradford City*	Coventry City	3–3	17 November 2013	
Ryan Lowe	England	Tranmere Rovers	Coventry City*	1–5	23 November 2013	
Nicky Ajose	Nigeria	Peterborough United*	Notts County	4–3	21 January 2014	
Febian Brandy	Saint Kitts and Nevis	Walsall	Notts County*	1–5	25 January 2014	
Dele Alli	England	MK Dons	Notts County*	1–3	11 March 2014	
Tom Hitchcock	England	Rotherham United	Gillingham*	3–4	5 April 2014	
Craig Davies	Wales	Preston North End*	Carlisle United	6–1	12 April 2014	
Nouha Dicko	Mali	Wolves*	Rotherham United	6–4	18 April 2014	
Kieran Agard	England	Rotherham United	Wolves*	4–6	18 April 2014	
Paul Gallagher	Scotland	Preston North End*	Shrewsbury Town	5–2	21 April 2014	
Matt Done	England	Rochdale	Crewe Alexandra*	2–5	19 August 2014	
Eoin Doyle	Republic of Ireland	Chesterfield*	Scunthorpe United	4–1	13 September 2014	
Eoin Doyle	Republic of Ireland	Chesterfield	Preston North End*	3–3	16 September 2014	
Dele Alli	England	MK Dons*	Crewe Alexandra	6–1	20 September 2014	
Garry Thompson	England	Notts County*	Crawley Town	5–3	18 October 2014	
Joe Garner	England	Preston North End*	Fleetwood Town	3–2	25 October 2014	
Benik Afobe	Democratic Republic of the Congo	MK Dons*	Colchester United	6–0	29 November 2014	
Izale McLeod	England	Crawley Town*	Barnsley	5–1	14 February 2015	
Joe Garner^{4}	England	Preston North End*	Crewe Alexandra	5–1	14 March 2015	
Ben Gladwin	England	Swindon Town	Rochdale*	2–4	14 April 2015	
Robert Hall	England	MK Dons*	Leyton Orient	6–1	18 April 2015	
Joe Garner	England	Preston North End*	Swindon Town	3–0	25 April 2015	
Nathan Tyson	England	Doncaster Rovers*	Scunthorpe United	5–2	3 May 2015	
Aden Flint	England	Bristol City*	Walsall	8–2	3 May 2015	
Nathan Byrne	England	Swindon Town*	Bradford City	4–1	8 August 2015	
Aiden O'Brien	Republic of Ireland	Millwall	Crewe Alexandra*	1–3	12 September 2015	
Jacob Murphy	England	Coventry City*	Gillingham	4–1	21 November 2015	
Conor Washington	Northern Ireland	Peterborough United	Scunthorpe United*	0–4	28 November 2015	
Lee Novak	England	Chesterfield*	Shrewsbury Town	7–1	2 January 2016	
Adam Armstrong	England	Coventry City	Crewe Alexandra*	0–5	2 January 2016	
Sam Winnall	England	Barnsley*	Rochdale	6–1	23 January 2016	
Will Grigg	Northern Ireland	Wigan Athletic*	Port Vale	3–0	30 January 2016	
Nicky Ajose	Nigeria	Swindon Town*	Blackpool	3–2	20 February 2016	
Andrew Tutte	England	Bury*	Colchester United	5–2	20 February 2016	
James Hanson	England	Bradford City*	Walsall	4–0	23 April 2016	
Lucas Akins	England	Burton Albion	Colchester United*	0–3	23 April 2016	
Jon Taylor	England	Peterborough United*	Blackpool	5–1	8 May 2016	
Ryan Colclough	England	MK Dons	Fleetwood Town*	1–4	24 September 2016	
Josh Morris	England	Scunthorpe United	Walsall*	1–4	27 September 2016	
Matty Taylor	England	Bristol Rovers	MK Dons*	3–3	18 October 2016	
Matty Lund	Northern Ireland	Rochdale	Northampton Town*	2–3	17 December 2016	
Billy Bodin	Wales	Bristol Rovers*	Coventry City	4–1	26 December 2016	
Josh Magennis	Northern Ireland	Charlton Athletic*	Bristol Rovers	4–1	2 January 2017	
Ellis Harrison^{4}	Wales	Bristol Rovers*	Northampton Town	5–0	7 January 2017	
James Vaughan^{4}	England	Bury*	Peterborough United	5–1	14 January 2017	
Keshi Anderson	England	Northampton Town*	Coventry City	3–0	28 January 2017	
Conor McAleny	England	Oxford United	Chesterfield*	0–4	25 February 2017	
Ricky Holmes	England	Charlton Athletic	Shrewsbury Town*	4–3	28 February 2017	
Josh Wright	England	Gillingham*	Scunthorpe United	3–2	11 March 2017	
Conor McAleny	England	Oxford United*	Bury	5–1	28 March 2017	
Kieffer Moore	Wales	Rotherham United*	Southend United	5–0	12 August 2017	
Jack Marriott	England	Peterborough United	Bristol Rovers*	1–4	12 August 2017	
Tom Eaves	England	Gillingham*	Southend United	3–3	26 August 2017	
Charlie Wyke	England	Bradford City*	Bristol Rovers	3–1	2 September 2017	
Lee Frecklington	Republic of Ireland	Rotherham United*	Walsall	5–1	12 September 2017	
Tariqe Fosu	Ghana	Charlton Athletic	Fleetwood Town*	1–3	30 September 2017	
Benjamin Whiteman	England	Doncaster Rovers*	Southend United	4–1	7 October 2017	
Lyle Taylor	Montserrat	AFC Wimbledon*	Rotherham United	3–1	17 October 2017	
Will Grigg	Northern Ireland	Wigan Athletic	Oxford United*	0–7	23 December 2017	
Erhun Oztumer	England	Walsall	Southend United*	0–3	3 March 2018	
Nathan Delfouneso	England	Blackpool*	Bradford City	5–0	7 April 2018	
Will Grigg	Northern Ireland	Wigan Athletic*	MK Dons	5–1	7 April 2018	
Theo Robinson	Jamaica	Southend United*	MK Dons	4–0	21 April 2018	
Tom Eaves	England	Gillingham*	Plymouth Argyle	5–2	5 May 2018	
Kieffer Moore	Wales	Barnsley	Rochdale*	0–4	21 August 2018	
Ian Henderson	England	Rochdale*	Gillingham	3–0	15 September 2018	
Danny Hylton	England	Luton Town*	Accrington Stanley	4–1	23 October 2018	
James Collins	Republic of Ireland	Luton Town*	Plymouth Argyle	5–1	17 November 2018	
Ivan Toney	England	Peterborough United	Accrington Stanley*	0–4	29 December 2018	
Marcus Harness	England	Burton Albion	Rochdale*	0–4	5 January 2019	
Andy Cook	England	Walsall	Gillingham*	0–3	19 January 2019	
James Collins	Republic of Ireland	Luton Town*	Peterborough United	4–0	19 January 2019	
Fejiri Okenabirhie	England	Shrewsbury Town	Bradford City*	4–3	29 January 2019	
Simon Cox	Republic of Ireland	Southend United*	Portsmouth	3–3	16 February 2019	
Joe Pigott	England	AFC Wimbledon	Rochdale*	3–4	19 February 2019	
Jonson Clarke-Harris	Jamaica	Bristol Rovers*	Blackpool	4–0	2 March 2019	
Gavin Whyte	Northern Ireland	Oxford United	Shrewsbury Town*	2–3	22 April 2019	
Sean McConville	England	Accrington Stanley*	Plymouth Argyle	5–1	27 April 2019	
Scott Fraser	Scotland	Burton Albion	Oxford United*	2–4	20 August 2019	
Chris Maguire	Scotland	Sunderland*	AFC Wimbledon	3–1	24 August 2019	
Joe Jacobson	Wales	Wycombe Wanderers*	Lincoln City	3–1	7 September 2019	
Ivan Toney	England	Peterborough United*	Rochdale	6–0	14 September 2019	
Tariqe Fosu	Ghana	Oxford United	Lincoln City*	0–6	21 September 2019	
Marcus Forss	Finland	AFC Wimbledon	Southend United*	1–4	12 October 2019	
Paddy Madden	Republic of Ireland	Fleetwood Town*	Burton Albion	4–1	19 October 2019	
Rushian Hepburn-Murphy	England	Tranmere Rovers	MK Dons*	1–3	2 November 2019	
Matt Godden	England	Coventry City	Wycombe Wanderers*	1–4	29 December 2019	
Matt Godden	England	Coventry City	Tranmere Rovers*	1–4	1 January 2020	
Siriki Dembélé	Ivory Coast	Peterborough United*	Shrewsbury Town	5–1	31 October 2020	
Jonson Clarke-Harris	Jamaica	Peterborough United*	Rochdale	4–1	12 December 2020	
Kyle Joseph	Scotland	Wigan Athletic	Burton Albion*	3–4	29 December 2020	
Charlie Wyke	England	Sunderland	AFC Wimbledon*	0–3	16 January 2021	
Joe Mason	Republic of Ireland	MK Dons*	Fleetwood Town	3–1	19 January 2021	
Dion Charles	Northern Ireland	Accrington Stanley*	Bristol Rovers	6–1	2 February 2021	
Charlie Wyke^{4}	England	Sunderland*	Doncaster Rovers	4–1	13 February 2021	
Mallik Wilks	England	Hull City	Wigan Athletic*	0–5	17 February 2021	
Kane Hemmings	England	Burton Albion	Crewe Alexandra*	0–3	13 March 2021	
Jonson Clarke-Harris	Jamaica	Peterborough United*	Accrington Stanley	7–0	27 March 2021	
Will Grigg^{4}	Northern Ireland	MK Dons*	Swindon Town	5–0	24 April 2021	
James Henry	England	Oxford United*	Lincoln City	3–1	28 August 2021	
Lee Evans	Wales	Ipswich Town*	Doncaster Rovers	6–0	28 September 2021	
Scott Twine	England	MK Dons*	Fleetwood Town	3-3	28 September 2021	
Ryan Bowman	England	Shrewsbury Town*	Cambridge United	4–1	23 October 2021	
Joe Ironside	England	Cambridge United	Cheltenham Town*	0–5	7 December 2021	
Ross Stewart	Scotland	Sunderland*	Sheffield Wednesday	5–0	30 December 2021	
Chris Maguire	Scotland	Lincoln City	Sunderland*	1–3	11 January 2022	
Cameron Brannagan^{4}	England	Oxford United	Gillingham*	2–7	29 January 2022	
Ryan Hardie	Scotland	Plymouth Argyle	Crewe Alexandra*	1–4	8 February 2022	
Alfie May^{4}	England	Cheltenham Town	Wycombe Wanderers*	5–5	19 February 2022	
Saido Berahino	Burundi	Sheffield Wednesday*	Cambridge United	6–0	12 March 2022	
Scott Twine^{4}	England	MK Dons	Plymouth Argyle*	0–5	30 April 2022	
Davis Keillor-Dunn	England	Burton Albion	Accrington Stanley*	4–4	13 August 2022	
Sam Smith	England	Cambridge United*	Burton Albion	4–3	27 August 2022	
Jack Diamond	England	Lincoln City	Bristol Rovers*	3–6	17 September 2022	
Jevani Brown	Jamaica	Exeter City	Forest Green Rovers*	0–4	24 September 2022	
Victor Adeboyejo	Nigeria	Burton Albion*	Forest Green Rovers	3–2	1 October 2022	
David McGoldrick	Republic of Ireland	Derby County*	Bristol Rovers	4–2	29 October 2022	
David McGoldrick	Republic of Ireland	Derby County*	Forest Green Rovers	4–0	17 December 2022	
Josh Windass	England	Sheffield Wednesday*	Cambridge United	5–0	2 January 2023	
David McGoldrick	Republic of Ireland	Derby County*	Morecambe	5–0	4 February 2023	
Dion Charles	Northern Ireland	Bolton Wanderers	Peterborough United*	0–5	11 February 2023	
Conor Chaplin	England	Ipswich Town*	Charlton Athletic	6–0	15 April 2023	
Jack Marriott	England	Fleetwood Town	Accrington Stanley*	2–5	15 April 2023	
Michael Smith	England	Sheffield Wednesday	Shrewsbury Town*	0–3	29 April 2023	
Jay Stansfield	England	Exeter City*	Morecambe	3–2	7 May 2023	
Devante Cole	England	Barnsley*	Port Vale	7–0	5 August 2023	
Victor Adeboyejo	Nigeria	Bolton Wanderers*	Fleetwood Town	3–1	15 August 2023	
Martyn Waghorn	England	Derby County	Peterborough United*	2–4	26 August 2023	
Jordan Rhodes	Scotland	Blackpool*	Reading	4–1	23 September 2023	
Jordan Gibson	England	Carlisle United	Bolton Wanderers*	1–3	7 October 2023	
Ethan Chislett	South Africa	Port Vale*	Wigan Athletic	3–2	16 December 2023	
Joe Taylor	Wales	Lincoln City*	Bristol Rovers	5–0	16 March 2024	
Jon Mellish	England	Carlisle United	Peterborough United*	1–3	29 March 2024	
Aaron Collins	Wales	Bolton Wanderers*	Reading	5–2	1 April 2024	
Dion Charles	Northern Ireland	Bolton Wanderers*	Reading	5–2	21 September 2024	
Richard Kone	Ivory Coast	Wycombe Wanderers*	Peterborough United	3–1	19 October 2024	
Kwame Poku	Ghana	Peterborough United*	Cambridge United	6–1	9 November 2024	
Azeem Abdulai	Scotland	Leyton Orient	Exeter City*	2–6	28 January 2025	
Jovon Makama	England	Lincoln City*	Bristol Rovers	5–0	15 March 2025	
Abraham Odoh	England	Peterborough United	Crawley Town*	3–4	1 April 2025	
Rob Apter	Scotland	Blackpool	Stevenage*	1–3	18 April 2025	
Lorent Tolaj	Switzerland	Plymouth Argyle	Doncaster Rovers*	1–5	20 December 2025	
Dom Ballard	England	Leyton Orient*	Reading	3–1	17 January 2026	
Marcus Browne	England	AFC Wimbledon*	Reading	3–2	7 February 2026	
Kyrell Lisbie	England	Peterborough United*	Wigan Athletic	6–1	7 February 2026	
Jack Marriott	England	Reading*	Wycombe Wanderers	3–2	14 February 2026	
Jayden Wareham	England	Exeter City	Peterborough United*	3–3	21 February 2026	
David McGoldrick	Republic of Ireland	Barnsley	Leyton Orient*	1–3	28 February 2026	
Kelvin Ehibhatiomhan	Nigeria	Reading	Luton Town*	2–3	7 March 2026	
Dom Ballard	England	Leyton Orient	AFC Wimbledon*	2–4	17 March 2026	
Jack Marriott	England	Reading*	Luton Town	3–4	15 August 2026	
Aaron Collins^{4}	Wales	Milton Keynes Dons*	Doncaster Rovers	6–1	31 October 2026	

== Multiple hat-tricks ==
The following table lists players who have scored two or more hat-tricks.

Rank	Player	Hat-tricks
1	(Scotland) Jordan Rhodes	7
2	(Northern Ireland) Will Grigg	5
3	(Republic of Ireland) Simon Cox	4
3	(England) Jack Marriott	4
3	(Republic of Ireland) David McGoldrick	4
6	(Northern Ireland) Dion Charles	3
6	(Jamaica) Jonson Clarke-Harris	3
6	(Republic of Ireland) James Collins	3
6	(England) Tom Eaves	3
6	(England) Joe Garner	3
6	(England) Rickie Lambert	3
6	(England) Glenn Murray	3
6	(Spain) Juan Ugarte	3
6	(England) Charlie Wyke	3
14	(Nigeria) Victor Adeboyejo	2
14	(Nigeria) Nicky Ajose	2
14	(England) Gary Alexander	2
14	(England) Dele Alli	2
14	(England) Sam Baldock	2
14	(England) Dom Ballard	2
14	(England) Michael Chopra	2
14	(Wales) Aaron Collins	2
14	(Wales) Craig Davies	2
14	(Republic of Ireland) Eoin Doyle	2
14	(Wales) Freddy Eastwood	2
14	(Ghana) Tariqe Fosu	2
14	(England) Matty Fryatt	2
14	(England) Matt Godden	2
14	(England) Neil Harris	2
14	(England) James Henry	2
14	(England) Lee Hughes	2
14	(England) Leon Knight	2
14	(England) Ryan Lowe	2
14	(Scotland) Chris Maguire	2
14	(England) Conor McAleny	2
14	(Wales) Kieffer Moore	2
14	(England) Brett Pitman	2
14	(England) Ivan Toney	2
14	(England) Scott Twine	2
14	(England) Nathan Tyson	2
14	(England) Dean Windass	2
