= Iván Cifuentes =

Spanish footballer

Personal information
- Full name: Iván Cifuentes Román
- Date of birth: 10 January 1996 (age 30)
- Place of birth: Albacete, Spain
- Height: 1.78 m (5 ft 10 in)
- Position: Forward

Team information
- Current team: Arandina

Youth career
- Albacete

Senior career*
Years	Team	Apps	(Gls)
2013–2016	Albacete B	67	(11)
2014–2016	Albacete	2	(0)
2016–2017	Valencia B	23	(2)
2017–2018	Logroñés	8	(0)
2018–2019	Murcia Imperial	19	(0)
2019	Navalcarnero	10	(0)
2019–	Arandina	17	(0)
- * Club domestic league appearances and goals as of 19:04, 22 March 2020 (UTC)

Iván Cifuentes Román (born 10 January 1996) is a Spanish footballer who plays as a forward for Arandina CF.

== Club career ==
Born in Albacete, Castilla-La Mancha, Cifuentes finished his formation with local Albacete Balompié, making his senior debuts with the reserves in the 2012–13 campaign, in Tercera División. On 12 March 2014 he signed a new contract, running until 2017.

On 11 May 2014, aged only 17, Cifuentes made his first team debut by starting in a 2–0 away win against Real Balompédica Linense in the Segunda División B championship. He subsequently returned to the B-side, being a regular starter in the fourth tier.

On 4 June 2016 Cifuentes made his professional debut, coming on as a half-time substitute for Jason in a 0–2 Segunda División away loss against CD Numancia; his side was also already relegated from the division. On 15 August he moved to another reserve team, Valencia CF Mestalla, after impressing on a trial.
