= Heidelberg Ball School =

- Company type: Limited company
- Industry: Education
- Founded: 1996; 30 years ago in Heidelberg University, Germany
- Headquarters: Heidelberg, Germany
- Website: Heidelberg Ball School website

The Heidelberg Ball School is an educational institute in Heidelberg University in Germany, established by Klaus Roth of the university's Institute of Sports and Sports Science in 1996. The school's methodology includes activity programmes for children to support motor development, encompassing children with motor deficits as well as those who are highly talented in sports games. The first ball school courses were introduced in primary schools in 1998. The programme was awarded in the innovation contest "Deutschland-Land der Ideen" (2009) and labelled a "hallmark of excellence" by the Platform for Nutrition and Movement (2003). The Heidelberg Ball School is supported by Dietmar Hopp and the Manfred-Lautenschläger Foundation.

== Concept ==
The Heidelberg Ball School is a non-profit institution with the objective of counteracting the children's ever increasing lack of movement. Children do not become specialists in one particular kind of sport, but rather all-rounders as they are trained in many sports through the holistic development of intellectual, emotional and motor skills. Playing with balls as well as the social integration within sports groups have priority – experiences children used to gain implicitly and without instruction on streets, football grounds and meadows. The Heidelberg Ball School follows the basic philosophy of integrative sports education.

During Ball School lessons, children play with their feet, hands and sticks/rackets/bats etc., acquiring skills such as recognising gaps, determining paths to the ball and the ideal position of playing it or controlling the passing of the ball. The programmes' curricula are based on four key principles for sports programmes for children: the principles of regarding the developmental stage, of versatility (goals), of joyful learning (content) and of implicit non-instructed learning (methods).

== Programmes ==
Heidelberg Ball School is an activity programme for children from 18 months to the end of primary school. This wide span involves the task to adapt the courses' aims, contents and methods to the different performance levels of the Ball School children. Altogether, the children go through four levels on their way of becoming young "trained" athletes pursuing health and fitness or volleyball-, tennis-, football-, hockey-, handball- or basketball-playing children.

Apart from general sports programmes for toddlers, pre-schoolers and primary school children, the Heidelberg Ball School also offers programmes for children with attention deficit hyperactivity disorder (ADHD), for overweight/obese ("Ball School light"), for physically handicapped and highly talented children.

== Scientific monitoring ==
The Ball School's scientific monitoring comprises two central forms of evaluation. Within the so-called input-evaluation, all participants (children, parents, trainers, headmasters, department heads) are asked about several aspects, including the following:

- Programme resources (Ball School: prominence, quality, effects etc.)
- Implementation resources/staff (trainers: quality, acceptance, popularity etc.)
- Implementation resources/sports facilities and material
- Participant resources (children: performance level, motivation, learning progress/success etc.)

A written interview about the Mini-Ball School, for instance, was attended by 516 educators: the nursery nurses' feedback clarifies that the Mini-Ball School is a high-quality concept, which can be perfectly integrated into the daily routine of kindergartens (grade= A-B). Output-evaluations gather all direct results/effects of the Ball School (pre-/post testing differences), e.g.:

- The children's learning progress in the area of playing (tactics, coordination, technique)
- The frequency of accessions to sports clubs
- The children's extracurricular engaging in sports activities

The Mini-Ball School's effects were evaluated by controlled study design. 370 children, aged 4, 5 and 6, were investigated in a longitudinal study. Children participating in the Mini-Ball School reached significant greater strides in terms of motor skills than children of the control group. In particular weak children seemed to benefit from the programme. Four-years-old children within the lower quartile reached an age-related, substandard motor quotient of 87.7 (standard quotient MQ= 100). When participating in a Ball School programme they could improve and reach an outstanding quotient (MQ = 106) when they were 6 and 12 years old.

Further output-evaluations were conducted including those evaluating the development of playing intelligence and -creativity of Ball School children at primary school age as well as those evaluating the programmes for children with ADHD, for overweight/obese and physically handicapped children.

== Publications (selection) ==
- E. J. Hossner, K. Roth (2002). Sportspiele vermitteln. In K. Ferger, N., Gissel, J. Schwier (Hrsg.): Sportspiele erleben, vermitteln, trainieren (S. 111–124). Hamburg: Czwalina.
- K. Roth (1999): Das ABC des Spielens: Technik- und Taktiktraining im Anfängerbereich. In J. Wiemeyer (Hrsg.): Techniktraining im Sport (S. 11–30). Darmstadt: IfS.
- K. Roth (2000): Die Heidelberger Ballschule: Praxiskonsequenzen des Modells der inzidentellen Inkubation. In W. Schmidt, A. Knollenberg (Hrsg.): Sport – Spiel – Forschung: Gestern. Heute. Morgen (S. 175–179). Hamburg: Czwalina.
- K. Roth (2003). Ballschule Rückschlagspiele: Theoretische Grundlagen. In A. Woll (Hrsg.): Miteinander lernen, forschen, spielen – Zukunftsperspektiven für Tennis (S. 41–58). Hamburg: Czwalina.
- K. Roth (2006). Ballschule Heidelberg: Vom Talentförderprojekt zum erfolgreichen "Kindersportangebot für Alle". In F. Bockrath (Hrsg.): Trends in der Sportvermittlung (S. 13–40). Darmstadt: TU.
- K. Roth (2014): Motorik ABC. In I. Hunger, R. Zimmer (Hrsg.): Inklusion bewegt: Herausforderungen für die frühkindliche Bildung (S. 147–163). Schorndorf: Hofmann.
- K. Roth, T. Damm, M. Pieper, C. Roth (2014). Ballschule in der Primarstufe. Sportstunde Grundschule Band 1. Schorndorf: Hofmann.
- K. Roth, C. Kröger (2011). Ballschule – ein ABC für Spielanfänger (4. Aufl.) Schorndorf: Hofmann.
- K. Roth, C. Kröger, D. Memmert (2002). Ballschule Rückschlagspiele. Schorndorf: Hofmann.
- K. Roth, D. Memmert, R. Schubert (2006). Ballschule Wurfspiele. Schorndorf: Hofmann.
- K. Roth, M. Raab (1999). Taktische Regelbildungen: "Mühsam, konzentriert, intentional oder mühelos, nebensächlich, inzidentell?" In M. Wegner, A. Wilhelm, J.-P. Janssen (Hrsg.): Empirische Forschung im Sportspiel – Methodologie, Fakten und Reflexionen (S. 73–84). Kiel: IfSS.
- K. Roth, C. Roth, U. Hegar (2014). Mini-Ballschule: Das ABC des Spielens für Klein- und Vorschulkinder. Schorndorf: Hofmann.
