= Jordi Malela =

Belgian footballer

Personal information
- Full name: Jordi Malela-Ndangba
- Date of birth: 14 January 1996 (age 30)
- Place of birth: Machelen, Belgium
- Height: 1.80 m (5 ft 11 in)
- Position: Defender

Team information
- Current team: Rebecq

Youth career
- 2008–2010: K. Diegem Sport
- 2010–2011: Anderlecht
- 2011–2013: Club Brugge
- 2013–2016: Standard Liège
- 2016–2017: OH Leuven

Senior career*
Years	Team	Apps	(Gls)
2017–2018	RKC Waalwijk	4	(0)
2018–2019	Rebecq	24	(0)
2019–2020	La Louvière		
2020–2021	Olympic Charleroi		
2022–2024	Crossing Schaerbeek		
2024–	Rebecq		
- * Club domestic league appearances and goals as of 20:51, 30 October 2019 (UTC)

Jordi Malela-Ndangba (born 14 January 1996) is a Belgian professional footballer who plays for Rebecq as a defender.

== Career ==
Malela has played for Club Brugge, Standard Liège, RKC Waalwijk, Rebecq and La Louvière. In 2016 he went on trial with English club Bradford City.

In the summer 2020, Malela joined Olympic Charleroi, which he played for until the end of the season.

Ahead of the 2022–23 season, in March 2022, Malela moved to Crossing Schaerbeek. Two years later, ahead of the 2024–25 season, Malela returned to his former club, Rebecq.
