= List of Watford F.C. players =

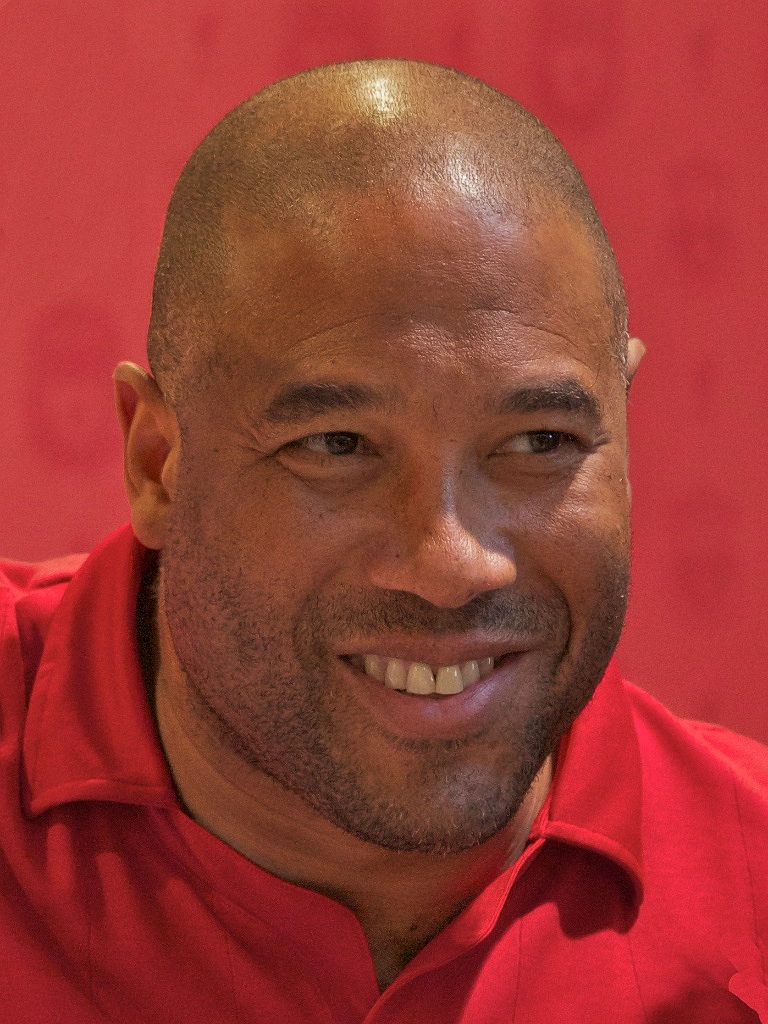
John Barnes made 31 appearances for England during his Watford career.

Watford Football Club is an English association football club based in Watford, Hertfordshire. Formed on 15 April 1898 as a result of the amalgamation of two strong local clubs, Watford St. Mary's and West Herts. West Herts began life as Watford Rovers in 1881, and renamed West Herts in 1891, the team joined the Southern League in 1896. West Herts amalgamated with local rivals Watford St. Mary's for the start of the 1898–99 season, to form a new club, Watford Football Club. Between 1898 and 1920, Watford competed in the Southern League, winning the championship in 1914–15. The Southern League was suspended for the next four seasons due to the First World War. On the league's resumption in 1919–20, Watford finished as runners up on goal average. At the start of 1920–21, Watford joined the Football League Third Division, and transferred to the Third Division South when the league was reorganised the following season. They have played in the Football League ever since, with the exception of 1939–1946, when competitive football was suspended due to the Second World War, and the 1999–2000 and 2006–07 seasons, when they competed in the Premier League. In addition to the latter two seasons, the club also competed in the top division of English football between 1982 and 1988, achieving their highest league placing of second in the 1982–83 season.

Many of Watford's individual records are held by former centre forward Luther Blissett. He has made more Watford appearances (503, including substitute appearances) and scored more goals for the club (186) than anyone else. His corresponding totals in the Football League (415 appearances and 148 goals) are also Watford records. Cliff Holton has scored the most goals for Watford in a single season; 48 in all competitions in the 1959–60 season, including 42 in the Football League. Eddie Mummery's five-goal haul against Newport County on 5 January 1924 is the club record for goals scored by a player in a Football League match. Watford's most-used goalkeeper is Skilly Williams, who played for the club 341 times between 1913 and 1926. John Barnes and Kenny Jackett share the record for the most international caps won while playing for Watford. Barnes made his first 31 England appearances before transferring from Watford to Liverpool in 1987. Jackett, a one-club man, made the same number of appearances for Wales. Seven people have played competitively for the club while managing them: John Goodall, Harry Kent, Fred Pagnam, Neil McBain, Bill Findlay, Ken Furphy, and most recently Mike Keen between 1973 and 1975.

== Key ==
This list contains players who have made 50 or more competitive appearances for Watford, since the amalgamation of West Herts and Watford St Mary's. Non-professional players (or any player who has not signed a first team contract) or any other academy player(s) are not on the list. (Note: Appearances made before the start of the 1898–99 season are not included, because West Hertfordshire and Watford St Mary's competed in the FA Cup as separate entities.) It includes appearances and goals in the Premier League, Football League, Southern Football League, FA Cup, Football League Cup, Football League Trophy, Full Members Cup, UEFA Cup and Anglo-Italian Cup. Appearances and goals in other competitions or non-competitive matches are not included. The table does not include appearances and goals from 1939–40; the season was abandoned after three matches due to the Second World War, and playing records from those matches were annulled.

Positions (Note: For more information, see Formation (association football).)
| GK | Goalkeeper | | |
| FB | Full back | DF | Defender |
| HB | Half back | MF | Midfielder |
| IF | Inside forward | FW | Forward |
| OF | Outside forward | FW | Forward |
| CF | Centre forward | FW | Forward |

Key
| Symbol | Meaning |
|---|---|
| ‡ | Player still at the club |
| † | Won the Player of the Season award. Multiple symbols denote multiple wins. |
| [PM] | Spent time as player-manager |
| * | Player holds club record(s) |
| Apps | Number of appearances for Watford |

== Players ==
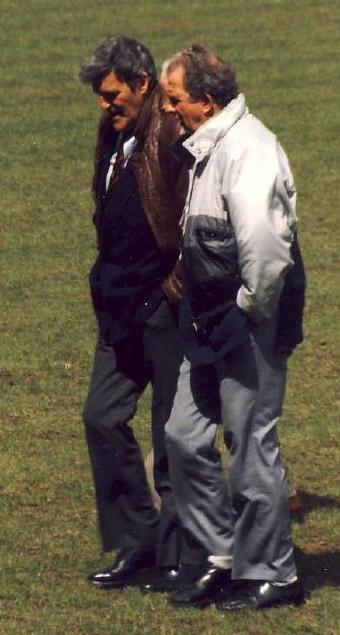
Maurice Cook (right) missed only four games between his debut and final appearance for Watford.

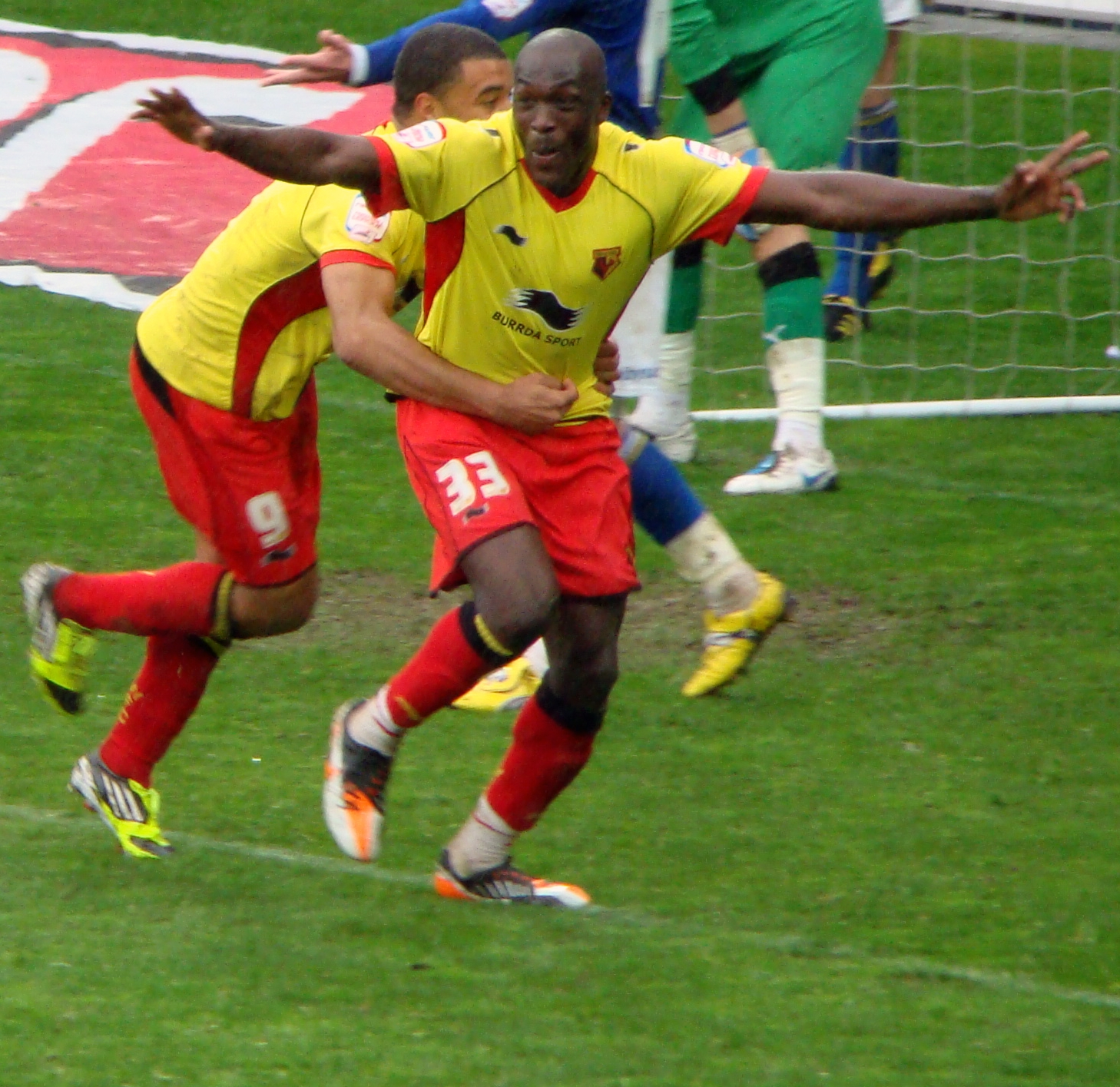
Troy Deeney (left) celebrates a goal with Nyron Nosworthy

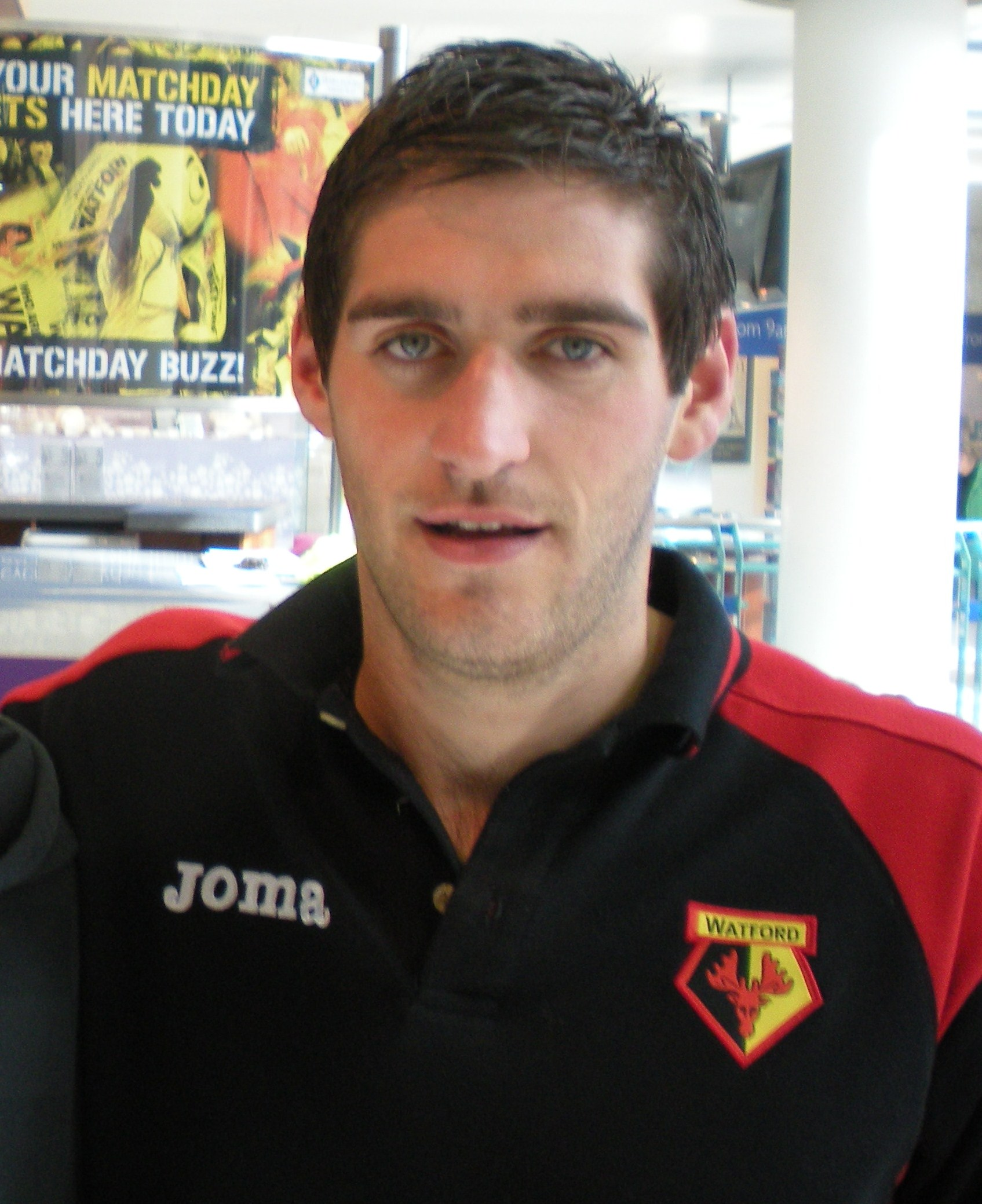
Danny Graham was the Football League Championship's top scorer in the 2010–11 season.

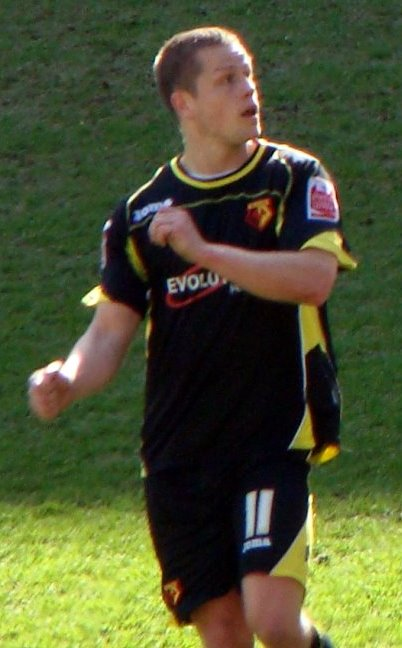
Heiðar Helguson played for the club in two periods between 1999 and 2010.

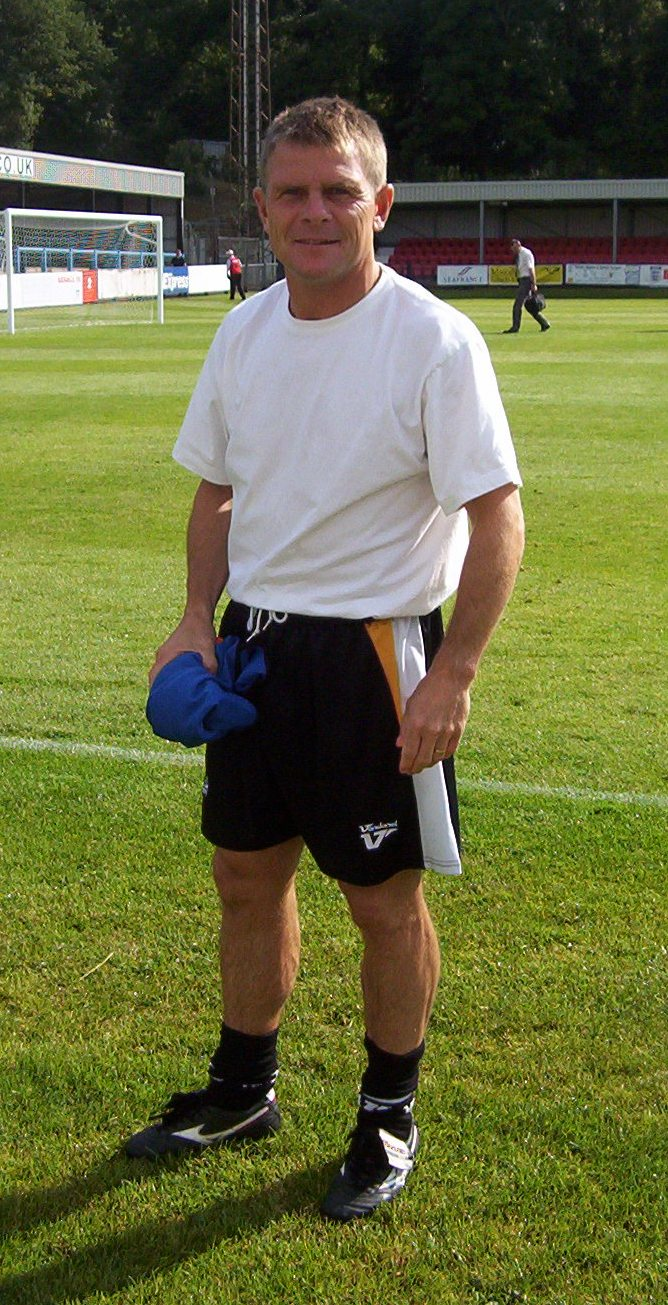
Andy Hessenthaler played for the team between 1991 and 1996.

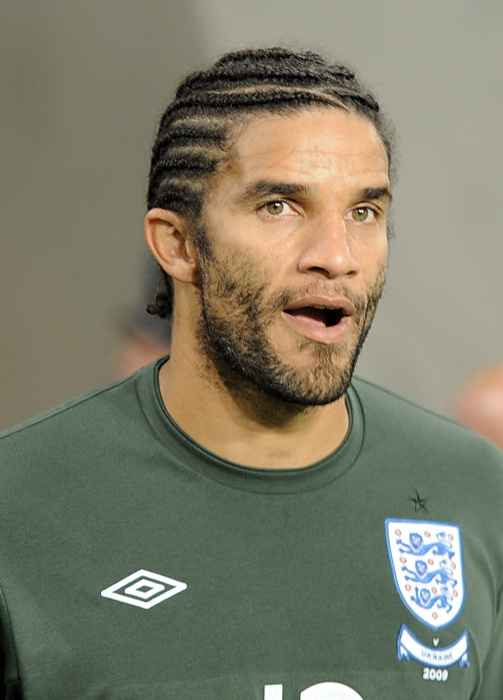
Goalkeeper David James started his career at Watford, and went on to play for England.

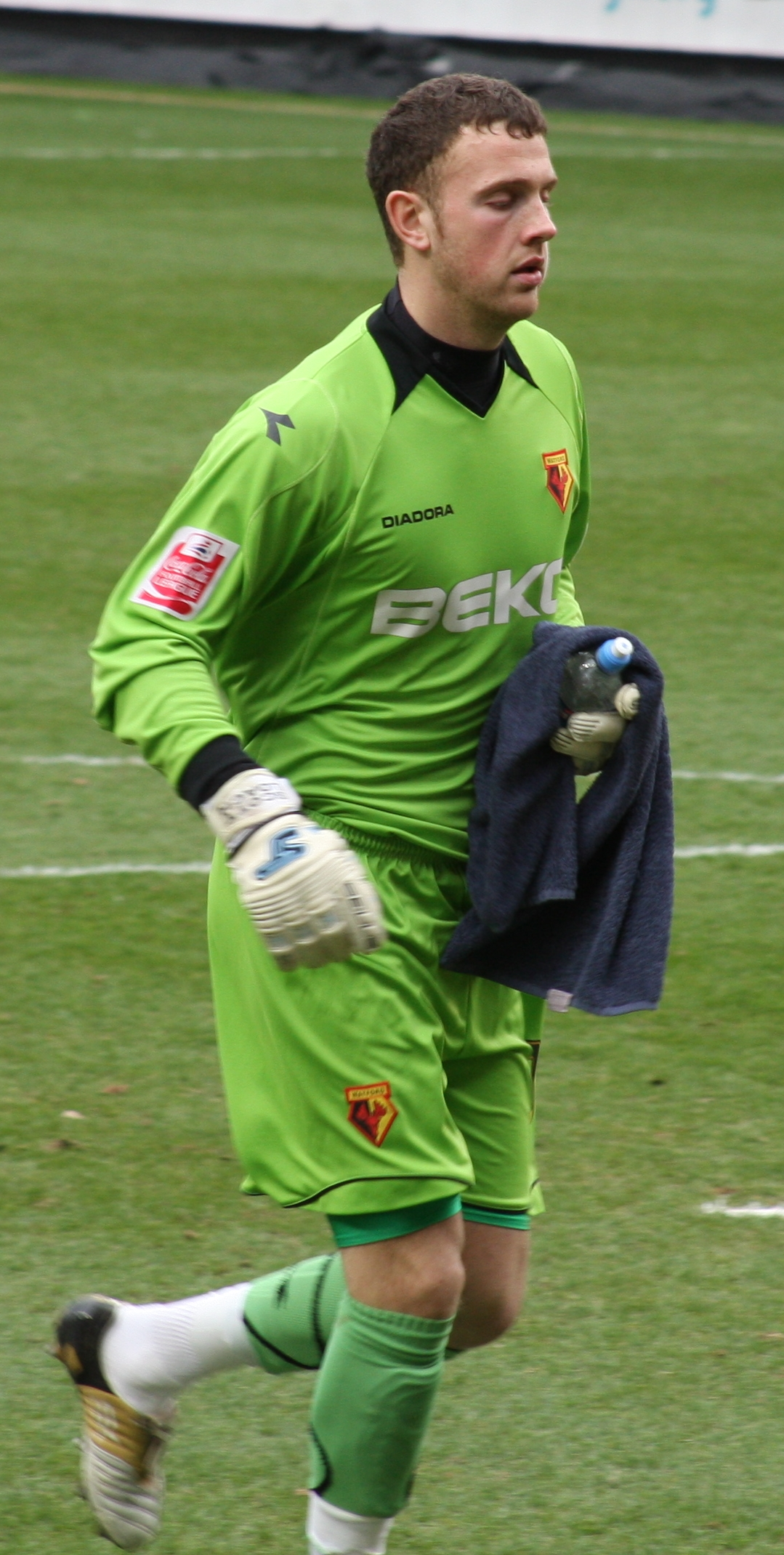
Scott Loach playing in goal for Watford

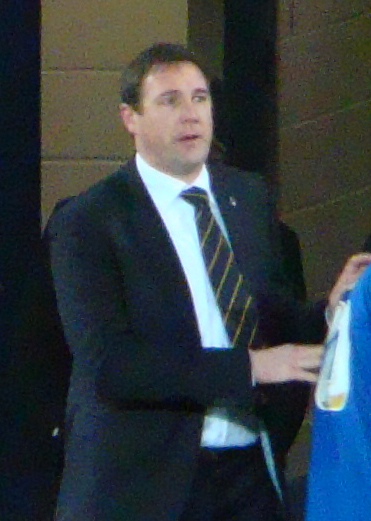
Malky Mackay played for Watford as a centre back, and later managed the team.

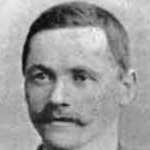
Jack McNee played for West Hertfordshire, prior to their merger with Watford St. Mary's in 1898.

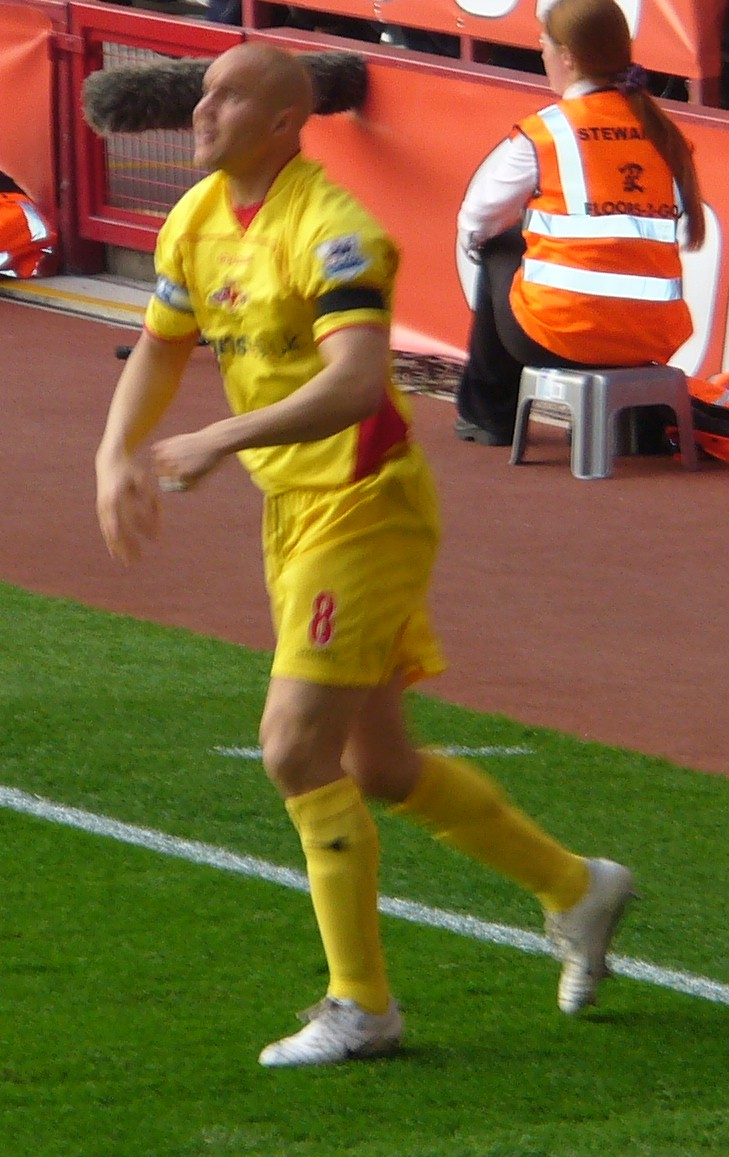
Midfielder Gavin Mahon was voted Watford F.C. Player of the Season in 2003–04.

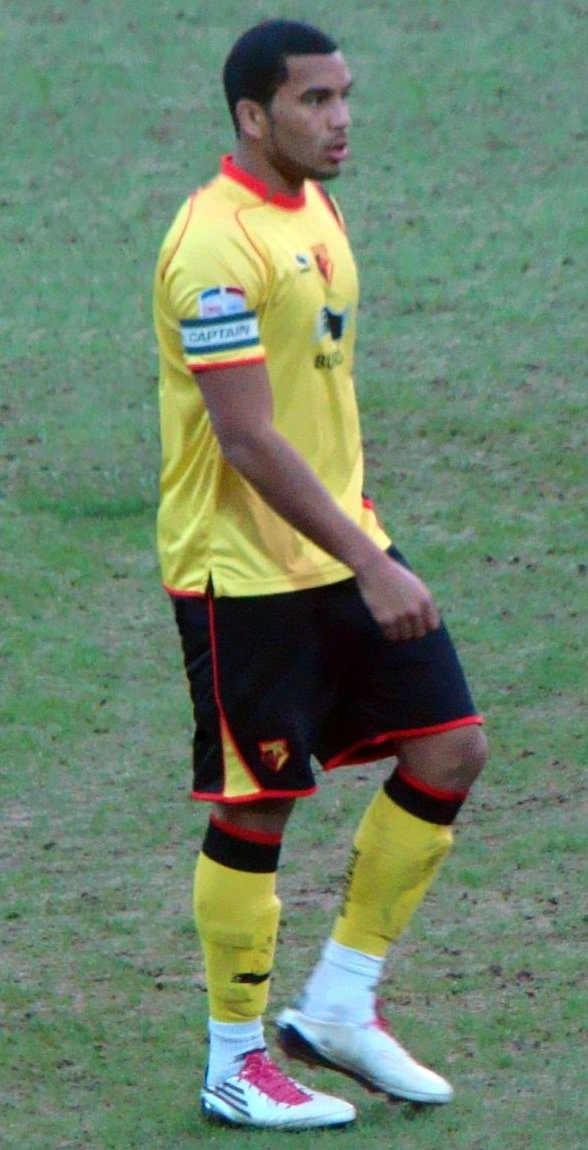
Adrian Mariappa graduated from Watford's academy, and has captained the team.

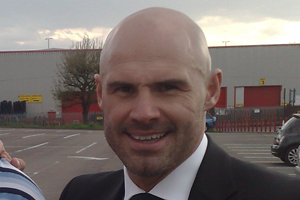
Tommy Mooney made 287 Watford appearances between 1994 and 2001.

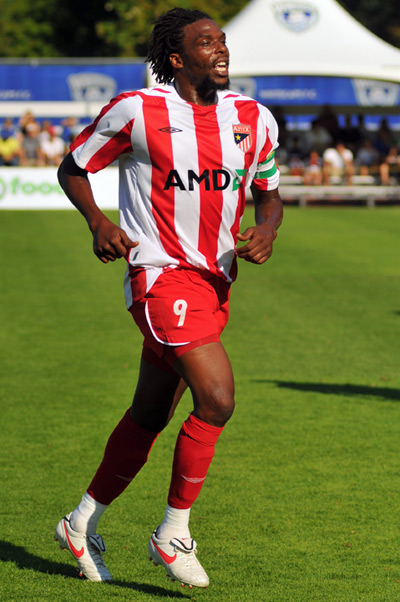
Academy graduate Gifton Noel-Williams played for Watford between 1996 and 2003.

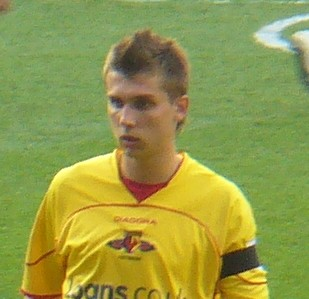
Hungary striker Tamás Priskin

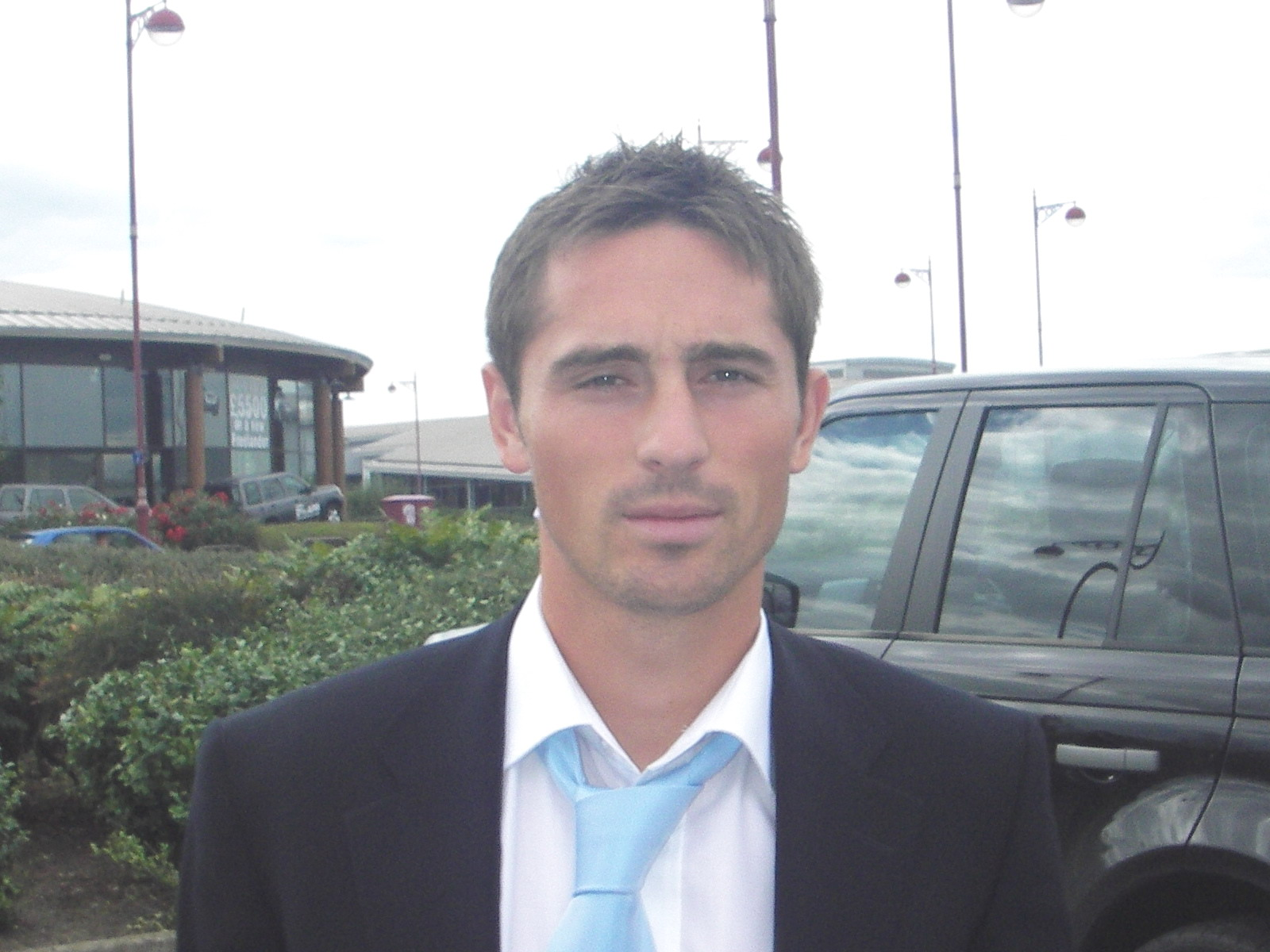
Tommy Smith won the Player of the Season award twice during his second spell at the club.

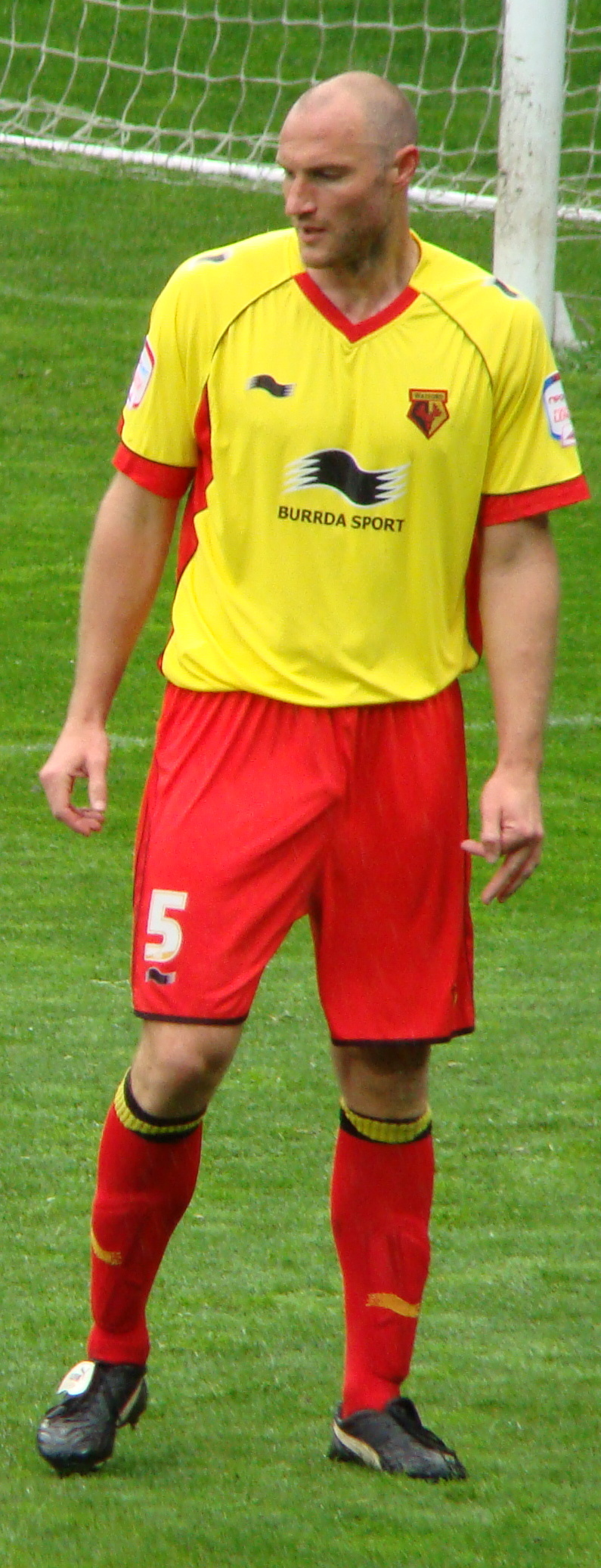
Centre back Martin Taylor joined Watford in 2010.

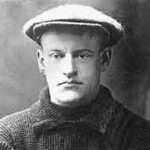
Skilly Williams was Watford's goalkeeper as they won the 1914–15 Southern League.

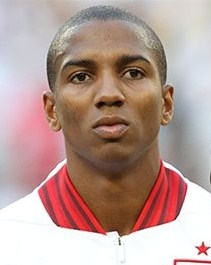
Ashley Young left Watford for a club record fee of £9.65 million in 2007.

Current players' statistics correct at the end of the 2023–24 season.

| Name | Position | Years at Watford (Note: Years given denote the span between a player's first and last peacetime appearance—they do not take into account appearances for Watford while peacetime competitions were suspended due to the First and Second World Wars. Where a player spent multiple periods at the club, these periods are denoted as multiple ranges of years.) | Apps | Goals | International honours (Note: Where a player did not compete internationally, no country is denoted. Only the highest level of international competition is given, except where a player competed for more than one country, in which case the highest level for each country is shown. Between 1926 and 1950, two competing teams claimed to represent the island of Ireland. denotes players who played for the Irish Football Association team. denotes players who played for the Football Association of Ireland team. For more information, see Ireland national football team (1882–1950) and Republic of Ireland national football team.) | Notes/refs |
|---|---|---|---|---|---|---|
| Almen Abdi | MF | 2012–2016 | 131 | 25 | Switzerland | |
| Chris Adams | OF | 1954–1956 | 82 | 6 | None | — |
| Malcolm Allen | CF | 1985–1988 | 58 | 13 | Wales | — |
| Manuel Almunia | GK | 2012–2014 | 81 | 0 | None | — |
| Tommy Anderson | IF / OF | 1957–1958, 1965 | 75 | 16 | Scotland schoolboys | |
| Gabriele Angella | DF | 2013–2015 | 82 | 10 | Italy under-21 | — |
| Ikechi Anya | MF | 2012–2016 | 138 | 9 | Scotland | — |
| Neal Ardley | MF | 2002–2005 | 128 | 7 | England under-21 | |
| Gerry Armstrong | CF | 1980–1983 | 97 | 19 | Northern Ireland | — |
| Jimmy Armstrong | HB | 1933–1939 | 201 | 2 | None | (Note: Also played for Watford during the Second World War.) |
| Barry Ashby | DF | 1989–1994 | 127 | 3 | None | — |
| Yáser Asprilla | FW | 2022–2024 | 86 | 7 | Colombia | – |
| Charlie Aston | FB | 1905–1908 | 110 | 1 | None | — |
| Daniel Bachmann ‡ | GK | 2017- | 140 | 0 | Austria | — |
| George Badenoch | HB / OF | 1903–1906 | 89 | 10 | None | — |
| Bert Badger | HB | 1906–1908 | 56 | 5 | None | — |
| Al Bangura | MF | 2005–2009 | 78 | 1 | Sierra Leone | |
| David Bardsley | DF | 1983–1987 | 121 | 9 | England | — |
| Jack Barnes | OF | 1931–1933 | 83 | 11 | None | — |
| John Barnes* | MF | 1981–1987 | 296 | 85 | England | (Note: Barnes and Jackett share the record for the most senior international caps won by a player while at Watford. Barnes made 31 appearances for England while at Watford; Jackett made 31 appearances for Wales during his one-club career.) |
| Tommy Barnett | IF | 1928–1939 | 431 | 160 | None | |
| Bob Barnshaw | HB | 1914–1921 | 61 | 4 | None | — |
| Ted Bassett | OF | 1919–1921 | 73 | 9 | None | — |
| Colin Bateman | FB | 1954–1957 | 56 | 0 | None | — |
| Cristian Battocchio | MF | 2012–2015 | 66 | 7 | Italy under-21 | — |
| Darren Bazeley | DF / MF | 1990–1999 | 281 | 27 | England under-21 | — |
| Bobby Bell | FB | 1957–1964 | 300 | 2 | None | — |
| Ted Bennett | GK | 1953–1956 | 86 | 0 | Great Britain; England amateur | (Note: Bennett played for Great Britain at the 1952 Summer Olympics.) |
| Micky Benning | OF | 1959–1962 | 122 | 15 | None | — |
| Arthur Betts | FB | 1907–1910 | 100 | 0 | None | — |
| Dave Bewley | FB | 1953–1956 | 120 | 1 | None | — |
| Billy Biggar | GK | 1904–1910 | 234 | 1 | None | — |
| Luther Blissett* | CF | 1976–1983, 1984–1988, 1991–1993 | 503 | 186 | England | (Note: Blissett holds the record for the most total appearances and goals for Watford. He also holds the club's records for the most Football League games and goals (415 games, 148 goals).) |
| Ian Bolton | DF / MF | 1977–1983 | 287 | 36 | None | † |
| Dennis Bond | HB / MF | 1964–1966, 1972–1977 | 301 | 42 | England youth | |
| Dennis Booth | MF | 1977–1980 | 117 | 2 | None | — |
| Hamer Bouazza | FW | 2004–2007 | 100 | 13 | Algeria | |
| Jimmy Bowie | IF | 1952–1955 | 130 | 40 | None | — |
| Joe Brooks | FB | 1903–1907 | 114 | 0 | None | — |
| Roland Brown | OF | 1901–1904 | 61 | 5 | None | — |
| Roy Brown | HB / CF | 1953–1957 | 147 | 41 | None | — |
| Tommy Brown | IF / HB | 1949–1953 | 113 | 12 | None | — |
| William Brown | FB | 1928–1935 | 241 | 0 | None | — |
| Chris Bulling | HB | 1911–1914 | 68 | 5 | None | — |
| Harold Bulling | FB | 1911–1915 | 103 | 1 | None | (Note: Also played for Watford during the First World War.) |
| Freddie Bunce | OF | 1955–1962 | 173 | 40 | England youth | — |
| Dave Butler | DF | 1970–1975 | 186 | 3 | None | — |
| Steve Butler | CF | 1991–1992 | 73 | 9 | England C | — |
| Nigel Callaghan | MF | 1980–1987, 1991 | 298 | 52 | England B | |
| Etienne Capoue | MF | 2015–2020 | 181 | 14 | France | — |
| Wilf Carter | HB | 1920–1925 | 131 | 4 | None | — |
| Marco Cassetti | DF | 2012–2014 | 81 | 1 | Italy | — |
| Craig Cathcart | DF | 2009, 2014–2023 | 274 | 8 | Northern Ireland | |
| George Catleugh | HB | 1954–1964 | 318 | 16 | None | — |
| Nathaniel Chalobah | DF/MF | 2012–2013, 2017–2021 | 127 | 4 | England | — |
| Alec Chamberlain | GK | 1996–2007 | 288 | 0 | None | † † |
| James Chambers | DF | 2004–2007 | 106 | 2 | England youth | |
| Billy Chapman | OF | 1928–1934 | 232 | 10 | None | — |
| Ken Charlery | CF | 1992–1993 | 53 | 13 | Saint Lucia; England C | |
| Giorgi Chakvetadze ‡ | MF | 2023– | 84 | 2 | Georgia | – |
| Sammy Chung | HB / CF | 1957–1965 | 243 | 24 | None | — |
| Tom Cleverley | MF | 2009–2010; 2017–2023 | 181 | 19 | England; Great Britain | † |
| Peter Coffill | MF | 1975–1977 | 69 | 7 | None | — |
| Tony Collins | OF | 1950–1953, 1957 | 112 | 10 | None | |
| Bobby Cook | OF | 1951–1952 | 56 | 9 | None | — |
| Lee Cook | MF | 2001–2004 | 64 | 7 | None | — |
| Maurice Cook | CF | 1953–1958 | 218 | 77 | None | — |
| Jack Cother | FB | 1898–1905 | 123 | 0 | None | — |
| Tony Coton | GK | 1984–1990 | 291 | 0 | England B | † † † |
| Don Cowie | MF | 2009–2011 | 94 | 9 | Scotland | |
| Neil Cox | DF | 1999–2005 | 248 | 21 | England under-21 | |
| Laurie Craker | MF / DF | 1973–1976 | 72 | 4 | None | — |
| Ron Crisp | HB / IF | 1961–1965 | 101 | 17 | None | — |
| Horace Cumner | OF | 1948–1950 | 66 | 7 | Wales | — |
| Arthur Daniels | OF | 1926–1930 | 146 | 17 | None | — |
| Taffy Davies | OF / IF | 1931–1950 | 312 | 72 | Wales wartime | (Note: Davies played for the senior Wales team in a wartime international match. Matches played during the Second World War were not subsequently recognised as full internationals, and are regarded as "unofficial".) |
| Tom Davies | HB | 1933–1937 | 61 | 3 | None | — |
| Joe Davison | FB | 1927–1931 | 147 | 2 | None | — |
| Troy Deeney | FW | 2010–2021 | 419 | 140 | None | — |
| Gerard Deulofeu | FW | 2018–2020 | 70 | 17 | Spain | — |
| Jay DeMerit | DF | 2004–2010 | 213 | 10 | United States | |
| Emmanuel Dennis | FW | 2021–2022; 2024 | 55 | 14 | Nigeria | – |
| Bill Devan | IF | 1933–1937 | 95 | 34 | None | — |
| Paul Devlin | MF | 2003–2006 | 88 | 6 | Scotland | |
| Tommy Dixon | CF | 1911–1913 | 80 | 26 | None | — |
| Abdoulaye Doucouré | MF | 2016–2020 | 141 | 17 | Mali | — |
| Bobby Downes | MF | 1974–1979 | 230 | 22 | None | — |
| Lloyd Doyley | DF | 2001– | 443 | 2 | Jamaica | |
| Jason Drysdale | DF / MF | 1989–1994 | 160 | 11 | England youth | — |
| Keith Dublin | DF | 1990–1994 | 190 | 2 | England youth | — |
| Len Dunderdale | CF | 1938–1939, 1946–1948 | 81 | 36 | None | |
| Sean Dyche | DF | 2002–2005 | 78 | 0 | None | — |
| Bruce Dyer | CF | 1993–1994, 2003–2005 | 116 | 23 | England under-21 | |
| Clint Easton | MF | 1996–2001 | 79 | 2 | England under-20 | |
| Keith Eddy | DF / MF | 1966–1972 | 274 | 31 | None | — |
| George Edmonds | CF | 1913–1920, 1926–1927 | 112 | 60 | None | |
| Tommy Eggleston | HB / FB | 1948–1952 | 186 | 9 | None | — |
| Jimmy Eggleton | HB | 1923–1926 | 52 | 2 | None | — |
| Nathan Ellington | FW | 2007–2011 | 56 | 5 | None | — |
| Joel Ekstrand | DF | 2012-2016 | 100 | 2 | Sweden | — |
| Barry Endean | CF | 1968–1971 | 93 | 37 | None | — |
| John Eustace | MF | 2008–2013 | 168 | 16 | None | — |
| Ralph Evans | IF | 1937–1948 | 96 | 32 | None | |
| Willie Falconer | MF | 1988–1991 | 116 | 13 | Scotland youth | — |
| John Farley | MF | 1971–1974 | 115 | 9 | None | — |
| Les Farnen | HB | 1946–1949 | 81 | 0 | None | |
| Alec Farrall | MF | 1966–1967 | 56 | 11 | England schoolboys | — |
| Tiny Fayers | HB | 1908–1910 | 69 | 2 | England amateur | — |
| Bill Findlay | HB | 1932–1939 | 137 | 6 | None | [PM] (Note: Findlay was player-manager between 1937 and 1944, and continued managing until 1947.) |
| Ken Fisher | HB | 1947–1951 | 110 | 2 | None | — |
| Scott Fitzgerald | FW | 2003–2005 | 59 | 12 | None | — |
| Ben Foster | GK | 2005–2007 2018–2022 | 207 | 0 | England | † |
| Fernando Forestieri | FW | 2012–2015 | 92 | 21 | Italy under-21 | |
| Colin Foster | DF | 1994–1996 | 78 | 8 | None | — |
| Cyril Foster | IF | 1925–1928 | 71 | 24 | None | — |
| Jack Foster | CF | 1905–1907 | 59 | 30 | None | — |
| Damien Francis | MF | 2006–2008 | 57 | 9 | Jamaica | |
| Colin Franks | MF | 1969–1973 | 124 | 9 | None | — |
| Eddie Fuller | HB | 1927–1929 | 59 | 0 | None | — |
| Paul Furlong | CF | 1992–1994 | 91 | 41 | England C | † |
| Ken Furphy | DF | 1964–1968 | 111 | 1 | None | [PM] (Note: Furphy was player-manager for the entirety of his Watford playing career, and continued as manager until 1971.) |
| George Fyfe | HB / FW | 1905–1910 | 128 | 7 | None | |
| Len Gallimore | FB | 1937–1946 | 75 | 0 | None | |
| Terry Garbett | FW | 1966–1971 | 231 | 50 | None | — |
| Alan Garner | DF | 1975–1979 | 232 | 16 | None | † |
| Brian Garvey | MF | 1965–1970 | 201 | 2 | None | — |
| Marcus Gayle | DF/FW | 2002–2005 | 115 | 9 | Jamaica | † |
| Tony Geidmintis | DF | 1976–1978 | 61 | 0 | None | — |
| Nigel Gibbs | DF | 1983–2002 | 491 | 7 | England under-21 | † |
| Stephen Glass | MF | 2001–2003 | 69 | 5 | Scotland | |
| Heurelho Gomes | GK | 2014–2020 | 160 | 0 | Brazil | — |
| John Goodall* | IF | 1903–1907 | 69 | 17 | England | [PM] (Note: Goodall was player-manager for the entirety of his Watford playing career. He continued managing the club until 1910. He is the oldest player ever to play for the club; on his last appearance he was 44 years 87 days old.) |
| Ken Goodeve | DF | 1974–1976 | 73 | 5 | None | — |
| Danny Graham | FW | 2009–2011 | 98 | 41 | England under-20 | † |
| Les Graham | IF | 1955–1957 | 94 | 32 | None | — |
| Andre Gray | FW | 2017-2021 | 125 | 21 | Jamaica | — |
| Albert Green | IF | 1913–1915 | 50 | 13 | None | |
| Fred Gregory | FB | 1911–1926 | 333 | 17 | None | |
| Tony Gregory | OF / HB | 1960–1963 | 119 | 17 | England youth | — |
| Val Gregory | HB | 1911–1920 | 161 | 16 | None | |
| Jock Grieve | HB | 1909–1911 | 68 | 1 | None | — |
| Dixie Hale | MF | 1967–1970 | 113 | 10 | None | — |
| Jamie Hand | MF | 2001–2006 | 61 | 0 | None | — |
| Charlie Hare | CF | 1898–1900 | 55 | 35 | None | — |
| Jon Harley | DF | 2008–2010 | 83 | 2 | England under-21 | |
| Tommy Harmer | IF | 1960–1962 | 74 | 7 | England B | — |
| Joe Harper | HB | 1946–1952 | 170 | 1 | None | — |
| George Harris | OF | 1962–1966 | 178 | 60 | None | — |
| Tommy Harris | FB | 1936–1948 | 102 | 6 | None | — |
| Steve Harrison | DF | 1978–1981 | 102 | 0 | None | — |
| Jack Harrop | FB | 1956–1960 | 117 | 0 | None | — |
| Johnny Hartburn | OF | 1949–1951 | 71 | 21 | None | — |
| Heiðar Helguson | FW | 1999–2005, 2009, 2010 | 228 | 75 | Iceland | † |
| Darius Henderson | FW | 2005–2008 | 117 | 31 | None | — |
| Mick Henderson | DF | 1979–1982 | 67 | 0 | None | — |
| Andy Hessenthaler | MF | 1991–1996 | 217 | 15 | England C | — |
| Joe Hewitt | GK | 1927–1931 | 110 | 0 | None | — |
| Johnny Hill | OF | 1898–1900 | 55 | 19 | Scotland junior | (Note: Player made additional appearances for West Hertfordshire prior to the start of the 1898–99 season.) |
| Alf Hitch | HB | 1906–1908 | 72 | 2 | None | — |
| Tommie Hoban | DF | 2011-2019 | 57 | 2 | Republic of Ireland under-21 | — |
| Frank Hoddinott | CF | 1919–1921 | 54 | 32 | Wales | — |
| Glyn Hodges | MF | 1987–1990 | 102 | 19 | Wales | † |
| Lee Hodson | DF | 2009–2013 | 91 | 1 | Northern Ireland | |
| Jonathan Hogg | MF | 2011-2013 | 84 | 0 | None | — |
| Rick Holden | MF | 1988–1989 | 54 | 10 | None | — |
| David Holdsworth | DF | 1988–1996 | 303 | 14 | England under-21 | — |
| Tom Holland | GK | 1930–1932 | 73 | 0 | None | — |
| Cliff Holton* | CF | 1958–1961, 1965–1966 | 163 | 104 | None | (Note: Holton holds the Watford record for the most goals in a season; 48 in 1959–60. His 42 goals in the Football League that season is also a club record.) |
| Arthur Horsfield | CF | 1975–1977 | 83 | 16 | England youth | — |
| Fred Horsman | FB | 1919–1924 | 138 | 0 | None | — |
| Will Hoskins | FW | 2007–2010 | 70 | 9 | England under-20 | |
| Billy Houghton | HB | 1964–1966 | 51 | 3 | England youth | — |
| Trevor How | DF | 1975–1979 | 101 | 2 | None | — |
| Bobby Howfield | CF | 1957–1959, 1962–1963 | 99 | 24 | None | |
| Archie Hubbard | IF | 1908–1909 | 53 | 20 | None | — |
| Will Hughes | MF | 2017–2021 | 118 | 8 | England Under 21s | — |
| Micah Hyde | MF | 1997–2004 | 286 | 44 | Jamaica | |
| Odion Ighalo | FW | 2014–2017 | 100 | 40 | Nigeria | — |
| Kenny Jackett* | DF / MF | 1980–1990 | 428 | 34 | Wales | |
| David James | GK | 1990–1992 | 98 | 0 | England | † |
| George James | CF | 1930–1933 | 94 | 76 | None | — |
| Ross Jenkins | MF | 2008–2014 | 95 | 2 | England under-20 | |
| Ross Jenkins | CF | 1972–1983 | 398 | 142 | None | † † |
| Billy Jennings | CF | 1970–1974 | 100 | 37 | England youth | † |
| Pat Jennings | GK | 1963–1964 | 52 | 0 | Northern Ireland | — |
| Joe Johnson | FB | 1920–1924 | 102 | 1 | None | — |
| Richard Johnson | MF | 1991–2003 | 277 | 22 | Australia | |
| Bryn Jones | FB / DF | 1963–1966 | 99 | 1 | None | — |
| Jimmy Jones | FB | 1947–1954 | 167 | 0 | Wales amateur | — |
| Tommy Jones | OF | 1935–1946 | 131 | 26 | Wales | |
| Roger Joslyn | MF | 1974–1979 | 214 | 21 | None | — |
| Christian Kabasele | DF | 2016–2023 | 166 | 7 | Belgium | — |
| Edo Kayembe‡ | MF | 2022– | 155 | 17 | DR Congo | — |
| Mike Keen | DF | 1972–1975 | 136 | 6 | None | [PM] (Note: Keen was player-manager between 1973 and 1975, and continued as manager until 1977.) |
| Frank Kelly | OF | 1905–1909 | 50 | 8 | None | — |
| Jimmy Kelly | HB | 1950–1954 | 123 | 4 | None | — |
| Jim Kennedy | HB | 1913–1915 | 52 | 3 | None | — |
| Peter Kennedy | MF | 1997–2001 | 134 | 22 | Northern Ireland | |
| Harry Kent | HB | 1909–1913 | 69 | 9 | None | [PM] (Note: Kent was player-manager between 1910 and 1913, and continued to manage the club until 1926.) |
| Marlon King | FW | 2005–2008 | 87 | 37 | Jamaica | † |
| Bobby Laing | OF | 1950–1952 | 60 | 8 | None | — |
| Billy Lane | IF | 1932–1936 | 127 | 68 | None | |
| Bunny Larkin | HB | 1962–1964 | 57 | 3 | None | — |
| Gerard Lavin | DF | 1992–1995 | 147 | 3 | Scotland under-21 | — |
| Billy Law | OF | 1906–1908 | 66 | 7 | None | |
| Richard Lee | GK | 2001–2010 | 110 | 0 | None | — |
| Walter Lees | DF | 1968–1976 | 253 | 11 | Scotland junior | — |
| Bernie Lewis | MF | 1967–1970 | 57 | 9 | Wales under-23 | — |
| Jim Lewis | FB | 1931–1939 | 116 | 0 | None | |
| Billy Lindsay | FB | 1903–1906 | 68 | 0 | None | — |
| Jimmy Lindsay | MF | 1971–1973 | 73 | 13 | None | — |
| Jimmy Linton | GK | 1959–1963 | 87 | 0 | None | — |
| Charlie Livesey | CF | 1962–1965 | 71 | 28 | None | — |
| Scott Loach | GK | 2008–2012 | 163 | 0 | England under-21 | |
| Arthur Lockett | FB | 1908–1912 | 154 | 1 | England | — |
| Jan Lohman | MF | 1981–1986 | 81 | 10 | Netherlands under-21 | — |
| Imrân Louza ‡ | MF | 2021– | 141 | 15 | Morocco | – |
| Harry Lowe | IF | 1929–1935 | 130 | 47 | None | |
| Ray Lugg | MF | 1969–1972 | 67 | 6 | None | — |
| Jimmy McAnearney | IF | 1963–1966 | 88 | 19 | None | — |
| Jobi McAnuff | FW | 2007–2009 | 92 | 5 | Jamaica | |
| Neil McBain | HB | 1928–1931 | 94 | 5 | Scotland | [PM] (Note: McBain player-managed the club between 1929 and 1931. He continued managing until 1937, and returned for a second spell as manager between 1956 and 1959.) |
| Dave McCartney | HB | 1903–1906 | 91 | 14 | None | — |
| John McClelland | DF | 1984–1989, 1990 | 234 | 3 | Northern Ireland | † † |
| Larry McGettigan | MF | 1971–1974 | 55 | 3 | None | — |
| Malky Mackay | DF | 2005–2008 | 61 | 5 | Scotland | |
| Jimmy MacLaine | IF | 1908–1911 | 107 | 35 | None | — |
| Jim McLaren | GK | 1933–1939 | 208 | 0 | Scotland schoolboys | — |
| Joe McLaughlin | DF | 1990–1992 | 53 | 2 | Scotland under-21 | — |
| Anthony McNamee | MF | 2002–2008 | 103 | 3 | None | — |
| Jack McNee | IF | 1898–1900 | 52 | 27 | None | |
| Vince McNeice | HB | 1957–1964 | 259 | 1 | None | — |
| Frank McPherson | CF | 1928–1930, 1933–1936 | 102 | 75 | None | |
| Gavin Mahon | MF | 2002–2008 | 215 | 7 | None | † |
| Sandy Main | HB | 1904–1911 | 75 | 1 | None | — |
| Terry Mancini | HB | 1961–1965 | 76 | 0 | Republic of Ireland | — |
| Adrian Mariappa | DF | 2005–2012 | 247 | 4 | Jamaica | † |
| Adam Masina | DF | 2018–2022 | 90 | 3 | Morocco | — |
| Alan Mayes | CF | 1974–1979 | 157 | 36 | None | — |
| Johnny Meadows | HB / IF | 1951–1960 | 236 | 46 | None | — |
| Keith Mercer* | CF | 1973–1979 | 154 | 53 | None | † (Note: Mercer was the youngest player to play for Watford in a competitive match, aged 16 years 125 days.) |
| Keith Millen | DF | 1994–1999 | 191 | 6 | None | — |
| Kevin Miller | GK | 1994–1997 | 151 | 0 | None | † † |
| Frank Mitchell | HB | 1952–1957 | 205 | 0 | None | — |
| Tommy Mitchell | OF | 1912–1914 | 63 | 9 | None | — |
| Tommy Mooney | DF / FW | 1994–2001 | 287 | 64 | None | † † |
| Jamie Moralee | CF | 1994–1996 | 61 | 7 | None | — |
| Jack Moran | FB | 1932–1935 | 106 | 0 | None | — |
| Lew Morgan | RB | 1946–1947 | 54 | 0 | Scotland schoolboys | — |
| Tom Morgan | HB | 1935–1938 | 113 | 6 | None | — |
| Harry Morris | HB | 1925–1928 | 50 | 4 | None | — |
| Mark Morris | DF | 1987–1989 | 53 | 2 | None | — |
| Pat Morrissey | CF | 1971–1974 | 117 | 29 | Republic of Ireland under-23 | — |
| Geoff Morton | GK | 1948–1951 | 113 | 0 | None | — |
| Eddie Mummery* | IF / HB | 1921–1925 | 126 | 23 | None | (Note: Mummery holds the record for the most goals by a Watford player in a Football League match. He scored five times against Newport County on 5 January 1924.) |
| Sean Murray | MF | 2010-2015 | 85 | 14 | Republic of Ireland under-21 | — |
| Jeremy Ngakia‡ | DF | 2020– | 137 | 4 | None | – |
| Michel Ngonge | FW | 1998–2000 | 57 | 11 | DR Congo | |
| Ken Nicholas | FB | 1959–1964 | 219 | 6 | England youth | — |
| Fred Nidd | FB / GK | 1900–1902 | 60 | 0 | None | |
| Allan Nielsen | MF | 2000–2003 | 113 | 19 | Denmark | |
| Gifton Noel-Williams | FW | 1996–2003 | 193 | 41 | England under-18 | |
| Lee Nogan | CF | 1991–1994 | 117 | 30 | Wales | — |
| Phil Nolan | IF | 1947–1954 | 95 | 8 | None | — |
| Nyron Nosworthy | DF | 2011-2014 | 61 | 2 | Jamaica | |
| Mick O'Brien | HB | 1931–1933 | 71 | 6 | Ireland; Republic of Ireland | — |
| Vic O'Brien | FB | 1934–1946 | 202 | 10 | None | |
| John-Joe O'Toole | MF | 2007–2009 | 66 | 12 | Republic of Ireland under-21 | |
| Harry Oliver | FB / HB | 1948–1952 | 128 | 4 | England schoolboys | — |
| Ken Oliver | CF | 1963–1964 | 63 | 28 | None | — |
| Brian Owen | MF | 1963–1970 | 170 | 20 | None | — |
| Mike Packer | DF | 1968–1973 | 77 | 2 | None | — |
| Rob Page | DF / DF | 1993–2001 | 252 | 3 | Wales | † |
| Fred Pagnam | CF | 1921–1927 | 157 | 74 | None | [PM] (Note: Pagnam was player-manager between 1926 and 1927, and continued managing until 1929.) |
| Steve Palmer | MF (Note: Although primarily a midfielder, Palmer played in every position for the club during the 1997–98 season.) | 1995–2001 | 272 | 9 | None | † |
| Juan Carlos Paredes | MF | 2014–2017 | 61 | 0 | Ecuador | — |
| Johnny Paton | OF | 1952–1955 | 91 | 17 | Scotland schoolboys | — |
| Tommy Paton | HB | 1948–1952 | 149 | 1 | None | — |
| Roberto Pereyra | FW | 2016–2020 | 115 | 18 | Argentina | — |
| Gary Penrice | CF | 1989–1991, 1995–1997 | 93 | 22 | None | |
| Kevin Phillips | CF | 1994–1997 | 65 | 25 | England | |
| Brian Pollard | MF | 1977–1979 | 85 | 8 | England youth | — |
| Andy Porter | HB | 1960–1963 | 80 | 4 | None | — |
| Gary Porter | MF / DF | 1984–1997 | 472 | 57 | England under-21 | † |
| Malcolm Poskett | CF | 1980–1982 | 80 | 31 | None | — |
| Ryan Porteous | DF | 2023–2025 | 82 | 7 | Scotland | — |
| George Prior | FB | 1924–1930 | 189 | 3 | None | — |
| Tamás Priskin | FW | 2006–2009 | 82 | 19 | Hungary | |
| Keith Pritchett | DF | 1976–1982 | 171 | 9 | None | — |
| Sebastian Prödl | DF | 2015–2020 | 85 | 13 | Austria | — |
| Daniel Pudil | DF | 2012–2015 | 108 | 3 | Czech Republic | — |
| Trevor Putney | MF | 1991–1993 | 65 | 2 | None | — |
| Craig Ramage | MF | 1994–1997 | 120 | 29 | England under-21 | — |
| Andy Rankin | GK | 1971–1979 | 329 | 0 | England under-23 | † † |
| Alf Reed | HB | 1935–1939 | 133 | 5 | None | |
| George Reilly | CF | 1983–1985 | 61 | 19 | None | — |
| Pat Rice | DF | 1980–1984 | 137 | 1 | Northern Ireland | — |
| Jack Richardson | HB | 1898–1909 | 179 | 5 | None | |
| Kevin Richardson | MF | 1986–1987 | 50 | 2 | England | — |
| Tommy Rigg | GK | 1946–1948 | 85 | 0 | None | — |
| Iwan Roberts | CF | 1986–1990 | 83 | 12 | Wales | — |
| Paul Robinson | DF | 1996–2003 | 252 | 9 | England under-21 | |
| Glenn Roeder | DF | 1989–1991 | 86 | 3 | England B | — |
| Peter Ronald | IF | 1914–1921 | 102 | 29 | None | — |
| Wilf Rostron | DF | 1979–1989 | 404 | 30 | England schoolboys | † † |
| Reg Saphin | GK | 1951–1954 | 59 | 0 | None | — |
| Ismaïla Sarr | FW | 2019–2023 | 131 | 34 | Senegal | — |
| Stewart Scullion | MF | 1966–1971, 1973–1976 | 348 | 55 | None | |
| Ken Sema | FW | 2018–2025 | 176 | 12 | Sweden | — |
| Albie Sharp | FB / HB | 1898–1901 | 69 | 3 | None | — |
| Bill Sheppard | IF | 1927–1929 | 95 | 39 | None | — |
| Steve Sherwood | GK | 1977–1987 | 269 | 1 | None | — |
| Tim Sherwood | MF | 1987–1989 | 51 | 2 | England | |
| Bill Shipwright | FB / HB | 1954–1959 | 153 | 0 | None | — |
| Danny Shittu | DF | 2006–2008 | 75 | 11 | Nigeria | |
| Francisco Sierralta | DF | 2020–2025 | 123 | 2 | Chile | – |
| Steve Sims | DF | 1978–1984, 1986–1987 | 219 | 8 | England B | † |
| Lee Sinnott | DF | 1983–1987 | 95 | 2 | England under-21 | — |
| Reg Slade | FB | 1921–1929 | 124 | 0 | None | — |
| Bert Slater | GK | 1965–1969 | 152 | 0 | None | — |
| Allan Smart | FW | 1998–2001 | 64 | 13 | None | — |
| Bert Smith | HB | 1925–1927 | 55 | 1 | Ireland | — |
| Frank Smith | IF / HB | 1921–1931 | 341 | 31 | None | — |
| Tommy Smith | FW | 1997–2003, 2006–2009 | 306 | 64 | England under-21 | † † |
| Jason Soloman | DF | 1989–1995 | 116 | 6 | England youth | — |
| Marvin Sordell | FW | 2009–2012 | 81 | 27 | England under-21 Great Britain | (Note: Sordell played for Great Britain at the 2012 Summer Olympics.) |
| Matthew Spring | MF | 2005–2007 | 53 | 9 | None | — |
| Arthur Squires | IF | 1909–1913 | 116 | 25 | None | |
| Eric Steele | GK | 1979–1984 | 65 | 0 | England youth | — |
| Jimmy Stephenson | OF | 1922–1927 | 209 | 20 | None | — |
| Worrell Sterling | MF | 1983–1988 | 122 | 17 | None | — |
| Alex Stewart | FB | 1910–1915 | 160 | 4 | None | |
| Jordan Stewart | MF | 2005–2008 | 117 | 2 | England under-21 | |
| John Stirk | DF | 1978–1979 | 60 | 0 | England youth | — |
| Jock Strain | HB | 1921–1927 | 193 | 6 | None | — |
| Jack Swann | CF | 1925–1927 | 59 | 31 | None | — |
| Brian Talbot | MF | 1985–1986 | 59 | 8 | England | — |
| Wally Tattersall | OF | 1910–1912 | 72 | 8 | None | — |
| Les Taylor | MF | 1980–1985 | 211 | 20 | None | † |
| Martin Taylor | DF | 2010–2012 | 95 | 10 | England under-21 | |
| Jimmy Tennant | OF | 1902–1905 | 92 | 21 | Scotland junior | — |
| Steve Terry | DF | 1980–1988 | 208 | 20 | None | — |
| Dave Thomas | CF | 1948–1950 | 111 | 43 | None | — |
| Rod Thomas | FW | 1988–1992 | 95 | 9 | England under-21 | — |
| Cyril Thompson | CF | 1951–1953 | 83 | 41 | None | — |
| Dániel Tőzsér | MF | 2014–2015 | 88 | 5 | Hungary | — |
| Ray Train | MF | 1978–1982 | 112 | 4 | None | — |
| Peter Turner | IF | 1904–1907 | 108 | 22 | Scotland junior | — |
| Dave Underwood | GK | 1952–1953, 1956–1957, 1960–1963 | 192 | 0 | None | |
| Dennis Uphill | CF | 1959–1960 | 58 | 36 | None | — |
| Paolo Vernazza | MF | 2000–2004 | 108 | 3 | England under-21 | |
| Matěj Vydra | FW | 2012–13, 2014–2016 | 92 | 38 | Czech Republic | — |
| Micky Walker | GK | 1968–1973 | 159 | 0 | Wales under-23 | — |
| Peter Walker | CF | 1954–1962 | 183 | 42 | None | — |
| Tom Walley | HB | 1967–1971, 1976–1977 | 248 | 18 | Wales | |
| Ernie Wallington | OF / IF | 1921–1922 | 53 | 5 | None | — |
| Jimmy Walsh | DF | 1974–1977 | 70 | 0 | None | — |
| Tom Walters | CF | 1935–1938 | 59 | 25 | None | |
| Dai Ward | CF | 1962–1963 | 66 | 32 | Wales | — |
| Darren Ward | DF | 1996–2001, 2008 | 77 | 4 | None | |
| Jack Warner | IF | 1926–1930 | 115 | 25 | None | — |
| Tommy Waterall | OF | 1914–1921 | 112 | 20 | None | — |
| Ben Watson | MF | 2015–2018 | 78 | 2 | None | – |
| Danny Webber | FW | 2002, 2003–2005 | 80 | 21 | England under-20 | |
| Joe Webster | GK | 1910–1914 | 148 | 0 | None | |
| Duncan Welbourne* | HB / DF | 1963–1974 | 457 | 25 | None | (Note: Welbourne holds the Watford record for the most consecutive league games (280).) |
| Colin West | CF | 1985–1986 | 56 | 23 | None | — |
| Charlie White | IF | 1909–1925 | 372 | 86 | None | |
| Ron Wigg | CF | 1970–1973 | 110 | 27 | None | — |
| Fred Wilkinson | HB | 1919–1921 | 74 | 1 | None | — |
| John Wilkinson | OF | 1921–1923 | 65 | 7 | None | — |
| Paul Wilkinson | CF | 1988–1991, 1995 | 159 | 55 | England under-21 | |
| Johnny Williams | DF | 1964–1975 | 419 | 2 | None | — |
| Skilly Williams* | GK | 1913–1926 | 341 | 0 | None | (Note: Williams has played more games in goal for Watford than anyone else.) |
| Lee Williamson | MF | 2007–2009 | 78 | 5 | None | — |
| Tug Wilson | CF / HB | 1951–1957 | 51 | 12 | None | — |
| Micky Wood | HB / IF | 1898–1901 | 61 | 2 | None | |
| Lew Woodroffe | IF / OF | 1947–1951 | 64 | 6 | None | — |
| Arthur Woodward | HB / GK | 1926–1939 | 420 | 18 | None | |
| Arthur Woolliscroft | IF | 1930–1933 | 67 | 16 | None | — |
| Nordin Wooter | FW | 1999–2002 | 70 | 3 | Netherlands under-21 | |
| Mark Yeates | MF | 2011-2013 | 66 | 7 | Republic of Ireland B | |
| Ashley Young | MF | 2003–2007 | 110 | 22 | England | |
