= 1977–78 Watford F.C. season =

English football team season

Watford F.C.
1977–78 season
- Chairman: Elton John
- Manager: Graham Taylor
- Stadium: Vicarage Road
- Fourth Division: 1st (promoted)
- FA Cup: Third Round (eliminated by West Ham United)
- League Cup: Third Round (eliminated by West Bromwich Albion)
- Top goalscorer: League: Ross Jenkins (16); All: Ross Jenkins (18)
- Highest home attendance: 18,947 (vs Southend United, 15 April 1978)
- Lowest home attendance: League: 6,850 (vs Grimsby Town, 6 September 1977); Cup: 5,722 (vs Reading, 13 August 1977)

Watford Football Club is an English football team, based in Watford, Hertfordshire. 1977–78 was the club's first season under the management of Graham Taylor, and its last in the fourth tier of English football. Watford ended the season as champions of the Football League Fourth Division with 71 points, the club's highest Football League total under the system of two points for a win, and three points short of the all-time Football League record set by Graham Taylor's Lincoln City side in 1975–76. The season also marked new club records for the most league wins in a season (30), most home wins (18), most away wins (12), and most away goals scored (42).

Ross Jenkins finished at the club's top scorer for the third time in four campaigns, with 18 goals in all competitions. He was followed by Alan Mayes and Keith Mercer with 16 and 13 goals respectively; both men also scored hat-tricks for the team. Bobby Downes and Alan Garner made the most appearances, playing some part in all 54 competitive fixtures. Garner went on to receive the Watford F.C. Player of the Season award for his efforts. Other player milestones included the arrival of future club captain Ian Bolton, and the breakthrough into the first team of young striker Luther Blissett, who went on to become the club's all-time leading appearance maker and goalscorer.

== Results ==
Watford's score listed first

=== Legend ===
Win	Draw	Loss

=== Football League Fourth Division ===
Date	Opponent	Venue	Result	Attendance	Watford scorers
20 August 1977	Stockport County	A	3–1	3,056	Jenkins (2), Ellis (pen)
27 August 1977	York City	H	1–3	7,620	Mayes
3 September 1977	Doncaster Rovers	A	1–0	2,963	Jenkins
6 September 1977	Grimsby Town	H	1–0	6,850	Blissett
10 September 1977	Huddersfield Town	H	2–0	7,852	Jenkins (2)
14 September 1977	Reading	A	3–1	4,862	Mayes (2), Blissett
17 September 1977	Barnsley	A	0–1	6,443	
24 September 1977	Darlington	H	2–1	7,632	Blissett, Ellis (pen)
27 September 1977	A.F.C. Bournemouth	H	2–1	8,191	Bolton, Coffill
1 October 1977	Rochdale	A	3–2	1,278	Joslyn, Mayes, Mercer
3 October 1977	Brentford	A	3–0	14,500	Ellis, Jenkins, Mayes
8 October 1977	Swansea City	H	2–1	10,232	Downes, Mercer
15 October 1977	Aldershot	A	0–1	8,059	
22 October 1977	Newport County	H	2–0	10,749	Downes, Mercer
29 October 1977	Crewe Alexandra	H	5–2	10,871	Mercer (3), Downes, Garner
5 November 1977	Hartlepool United	A	2–1	3,121	Garner, Mercer
12 November 1977	Scunthorpe United	H	4–1	10,565	Jenkins (2), Mercer (2)
19 November 1977	Southend United	A	0–1	10,919	
3 December 1977	Halifax Town	H	1–1	9,329	Garner
10 December 1977	Southport	A	2–2	1,727	Jenkins, Pollard
26 December 1977	Northampton Town	H	3–0	15,056	Downes, Mayes, Pollard
27 December 1977	Torquay United	A	3–2	6,228	Mayes (2), Bolton
31 December 1977	Wimbledon	A	3–1	7,324	Downes, Jenkins, Mayes
2 January 1978	Hartlepool United	H	1–0	16,866	Bolton
13 January 1978	Stockport County	H	1–0	12,754	Garner
21 January 1978	York City	A	4–0	3,831	Mayes (3), Blissett
28 January 1978	Doncaster Rovers	H	6–0	11,816	Joslyn (2), Bolton, Downes, Garner, Jenkins
11 February 1978	Barnsley	H	0–0	13,216	
25 February 1978	Rochdale	H	1–0	10,139	Jenkins
3 March 1978	Swansea City	A	3–3	15,000	Bolton, Jenkins, Mayes
7 March 1978	Reading	H	1–0	11,439	Garner
11 March 1978	Aldershot	H	1–0	12,641	Downes
14 March 1978	Huddersfield Town	A	0–1	6,603	
17 March 1978	Newport County	A	2–2	8,409	Downes, Jenkins
24 March 1978	Crewe Alexandra	A	2–2	4,652	Ellis (pen), Jenkins
25 March 1978	Torquay United	H	1–0	10,491	Garner
28 March 1978	Northampton Town	A	2–0	8,041	Bolton, Mayes
1 April 1978	Wimbledon	H	2–0	11,212	Mayes, Pritchett
4 April 1978	A.F.C. Bournemouth	A	2–1	6,532	Downes, Pollard
8 April 1978	Scunthorpe United	A	1–0	5,202	Joslyn
11 April 1978	Grimsby Town	A	1–1	7,189	Pritchett
15 April 1978	Southend United	H	1–1	18,947	Jenkins
18 April 1978	Darlington	A	0–0	2,407	
22 April 1978	Halifax Town	A	1–1	3,542	How
25 April 1978	Brentford	H	1–1	16,544	Blissett
29 April 1978	Southport	H	3–2	10,089	Pritchett (2 pens), Blissett

=== FA Cup ===
Round	Date	Opponent	Venue	Result	Attendance	Watford scorers
R1	26 November 1977	Hendon	H	2–0	11,825	Garner, Mercer
R2	17 December 1977	Colchester United	H	2–0	11,907	Jenkins, Mercer
R3	7 January 1978	West Ham United	A	0–1	36,475	

=== League Cup ===
Round	Date	Opponent	Venue	Result	Attendance	Watford scorers
R1 1st Leg	13 August 1977	Reading	H	2–1	5,722	Mercer (2)
R1 2nd Leg	17 August 1977	Reading	A	0–1	4,533	
R1 Replay	23 August 1977	Reading	H	5–0	7,082	Downes, Ellis (pen), Joslyn, Mayes, Pritchett
R2	30 August 1977	Grimsby Town	A	2–1	4,345	Bolton, Jenkins
R3	25 October 1977	West Bromwich Albion	A	0–1	22,140	

== League table ==
Pos	Team	Pld	W	D	L	GF	GA	GD	Pts	Promotion or relegation
1	Watford (C, P)	46	30	11	5	85	38	+47	71	Promotion to the Third Division
2	Southend United (P)	46	25	10	11	66	39	+27	60	Promotion to the Third Division
3	Swansea City (P)	46	23	10	13	87	47	+40	56	Promotion to the Third Division
4	Brentford (P)	46	21	14	11	86	54	+32	56	Promotion to the Third Division
5	Aldershot	46	19	16	11	67	47	+20	54	

(C) Champions; (P) Promoted
