= Ross Jenkins =

Ross Jenkins may refer to:

- Ross Jenkins (footballer, born 1951), English former footballer who spent a long part of his career with Watford
- Ross Jenkins (footballer, born 1990), English former footballer who played in England, Romania, Bulgaria, Norway and Scotland
