= Tom Walters =

Tom Walters may refer to:

- Tom Walters (American football) (born 1942), safety for the Washington Redskins
- Tom Walters (association footballer) (1909–1968), forward in the Football League
- Tom Walters (American politician), member of the Wyoming House of Representatives
- Tom Walters (broadcaster), chief of the CTV News Los Angeles bureau
- Thomas Walters (South African politician), member of the National Assembly of South Africa

== See also ==
- Thomas Waters (disambiguation)
- Thomas Walter (disambiguation)
