= Thomas Waters =

Thomas Waters may refer to:

- Thomas Waters (architect), Irish civil engineer and architect
- T. A. Waters (Thomas Alan Waters, 1938–1998), American magician and writer
- T. K. Waters (Thomas Kevin Waters), American law enforcement officer and politician
- Thomas Waters (MP) for King's Lynn (UK Parliament constituency)
- Thomas Walters (South African politician) (born 1976)
- Thomas Waters, a pseudonym of William Russell (1806–1876), English crime story writer

== See also ==
- Thomas Watters, Oriental scholar
- Thomas Walters (disambiguation)
- Thomas Walter (disambiguation)
