= List of Watford F.C. managers =

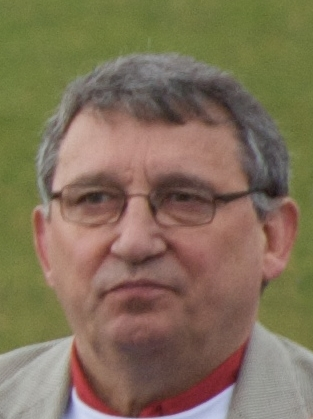
Graham Taylor led Watford to their highest ever league position in 1983.

Watford Football Club are an English association football club, based in Watford, Hertfordshire. As of 2026, the team competes in the EFL Championship, the second-highest level of the English football league system. Four people – Len Goulden, Neil McBain, Javi Gracia and Quique Sánchez Flores – have taken charge of the club on two occasions, while Graham Taylor had three stints as manager of the club.

== Managers ==
Correct as of 22 November 2026

Manager	From	To	M	W	D	L	Win %	Honours and achievements	Notes
John Goodall	May 1903	May 1910	253	91	64	98	35.97	Southern League Second Division champions, 1903–04; United League Champions, 1905–06	
Harry Kent	May 1910	May 1926	484	187	121	176	38.64	Southern League First Division champions, 1914–15; Southern League First Division runners-up, 1919–20	
Fred Pagnam	May 1926	May 1929	133	49	28	56	36.84	—	
Neil McBain	May 1929	August 1937	364	152	77	135	41.76	—	
Bill Findlay	August 1937	February 1947	114	50	25	39	43.86	Football League Third Division South Cup, 1937	
Jack Bray	March 1947	January 1948	40	11	10	19	27.50	—	
Eddie Hapgood	February 1948	March 1950	95	32	29	34	33.68	—	
Ron Gray	March 1950	August 1951	56	13	15	28	23.21	—	
Haydn Green	August 1951	October 1952	64	21	14	29	32.81	—	
Len Goulden	November 1952	October 1955	143	54	41	48	37.76	—	
Johnny Paton	October 1955	February 1956	17	3	6	8	17.65	—	
Len Goulden	February 1956	July 1956	17	6	3	8	35.29	—	
Neil McBain	August 1956	February 1959	131	44	35	52	33.59	—	
Ron Burgess	February 1959	May 1963	220	92	50	78	41.82	Football League Fourth Division promotion, 1959–60	
Bill McGarry	July 1963	October 1964	68	29	21	18	42.65	—	
Ken Furphy	November 1964	July 1971	334	132	86	116	39.52	Football League Third Division champions, 1968–69, FA Cup semi-finalists, 1970, whilst in second flight	
George Kirby	August 1971	May 1973	97	21	27	49	21.65	—	
Mike Keen	June 1973	April 1977	196	73	52	71	37.24	—	
Graham Taylor	June 1977	May 1987	527	244	124	159	46.30	Football League Fourth Division champions, 1977–78; Football League Third Division runners-up, 1978–79; Football League Second Division runners-up, 1981–82; Football League First Division runners-up, 1982–83; FA Cup runners-up, 1983–84; FA Cup semi-finalists, 1987	
Dave Bassett	May 1987	January 1988	28	7	8	13	25.00	—	
Steve Harrison	January 1988	March 1990	115	40	36	39	34.78	Watford relegated to EFL 2nd division	
Colin Lee	March 1990	November 1990	35	7	10	18	20.00	—	
Steve Perryman	November 1990	July 1993	132	44	37	51	33.33	—	
Glenn Roeder	July 1993	February 1996	139	44	40	55	31.65	—	
Graham Taylor	February 1996	June 1996	18	5	8	5	27.78	—	
Kenny Jackett	June 1996	June 1997	55	20	20	15	36.40	—	
Graham Taylor	June 1997	May 2001	202	79	52	71	39.11	Football League Second Division champions, 1997–98; Football League First Division play-off winners, 1998–99	
Gianluca Vialli	May 2001	June 2002	52	20	11	21	38.46	—	
Ray Lewington	June 2002	March 2005	150	51	39	60	34.00	FA Cup semi-finalists, 2003, whilst in second flight	
Aidy Boothroyd	March 2005	November 2008	176	65	51	60	36.93	Football League Championship play-off winners, 2005–06, FA Cup semi-finalists, 2007	
Malky Mackay (caretaker)	November 2008	November 2008	5	2	1	2	40.00	—	
Brendan Rodgers	November 2008	June 2009	31	13	6	12	41.93	—	
Malky Mackay	June 2009	June 2011	99	33	25	41	33.33	—	
Sean Dyche	June 2011	July 2012	49	17	17	15	34.69	—	
Gianfranco Zola	July 2012	December 2013	75	33	15	27	44.00	—	
Giuseppe Sannino	December 2013	August 2014	36	15	9	12	41.67	—	
Óscar García Junyent	September 2014	September 2014	4	1	2	1	25.00	—	
Billy McKinlay	September 2014	October 2014	2	1	1	0	50.00	—	
Slaviša Jokanović	October 2014	June 2015	36	21	5	10	58.33	Runner up in the 2014–15 Football League Championship, promotion to English Premier League	
Quique Sánchez Flores	June 2015	May 2016	44	16	9	19	36.36	Took Watford to the semi-final of the 2015–16 FA Cup	
Walter Mazzarri	July 2016	May 2017	41	12	7	22	29.27	—	
Marco Silva	May 2017	January 2018	26	8	5	13	30.77	—	
Javi Gracia	21 January 2018	7 September 2019	66	25	13	28	37.88	Took Watford to the final of the 2018–19 FA Cup	
Quique Sánchez Flores	September 2019	December 2019	12	2	4	6	16.67	—	
Hayden Mullins (caretaker)	December 2019	December 2019	2	0	1	1	0.00	—	
Nigel Pearson	December 2019	July 2020	22	7	5	10	31.82	—	
Hayden Mullins (caretaker)	July 2020	July 2020	2	0	0	2	0.00	Watford relegated to EFL Championship	
Vladimir Ivić	August 2020	December 2020	22	9	8	5	40.91	—	
Xisco Muñoz	December 2020	October 2021	36	21	4	11	58.33	Watford promoted to Premier League	
Claudio Ranieri	October 2021	January 2022	14	2	1	11	14.29	—	
Roy Hodgson	January 2022	May 2022	18	2	3	13	11.10	Watford relegated to EFL Championship	
Rob Edwards	May 2022	September 2022	11	3	5	3	27.27	—	
Slaven Bilić	September 2022	March 2023	26	10	7	9	38.46	—	
Chris Wilder	March 2023	May 2023	11	3	3	5	27.27	—	
Valérien Ismaël	May 2023	March 2024	48	13	16	19	27.08	—	
Tom Cleverley	March 2024	May 2025	59	20	14	25	33.90	—	
Paulo Pezzolano	13 May 2025	8 October 2025	10	3	3	4	30.00	—	
Javi Gracia	8 October 2025	1 February 2026	20	8	6	6	40.00	—	
Charlie Daniels (caretaker)	1 February 2026	9 February 2026	2	0	1	1	0.00	—	
Edward Still	9 February 2026	3 May 2026	15	3	4	8	20.00	—	
Alessio Dionisi	5 June 2026	22 November 2026	18	5	3	10	27.78	—	

== Playing records ==
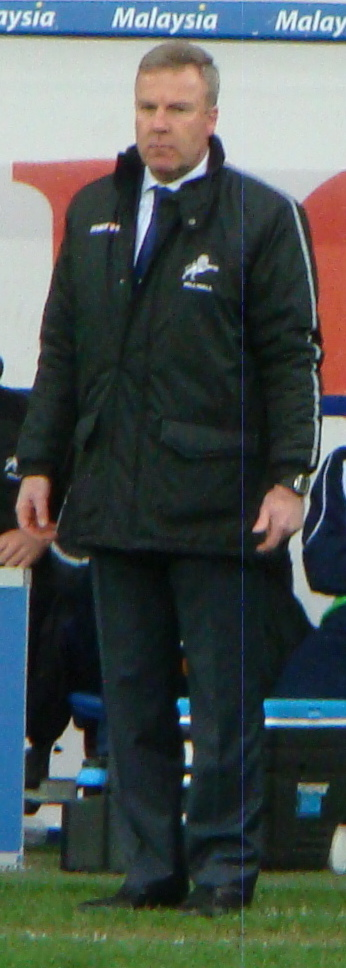
Kenny Jackett spent his entire playing career at Watford

Fifteen Watford managers played for Watford before or whilst managing them.

Player	Position	Years	Apps	Goals	National team	Notes
John Goodall	FW	1903–1907	69	17	England	Player-manager
Harry Kent	DF	1909–1913	69	9	None	Player-manager from 1910
Fred Pagnam	FW	1921–1927	157	74	None	Player-manager between 1926 and 1927
Neil McBain	DF	1928–1931	94	5	Scotland	Player-manager between 1929 and 1931
Bill Findlay	DF	1932–1944	137	6	Scotland junior	Player-manager between 1937 and 1944
Ron Gray	DF	1942–1946	29	4	None	—
Johnny Paton	MF	1952–1955	91	17	Scotland schoolboys	—
Ken Furphy	DF	1964–1968	111	1	None	Player-manager until 1968
Mike Keen	DF	1972–1975	136	6	None	Player-manager between 1973 and 1975
Steve Harrison	DF	1978–1981	102	0	None	—
Glenn Roeder	DF	1989–1991	86	3	England B	—
Kenny Jackett	MF	1980–1990	428	34	Wales	—
Malky Mackay	DF	2005–2008	61	5	Scotland	—
Sean Dyche	DF	2002–2005	78	0	None	—
Malky Mackay	DF	2005–2008	61	5	Scotland	—
Sean Dyche	DF	2002–2005	78	0	None	—
Tom Cleverley	MF	2009–2010 and 2017–2023	187	19	England	—
