= Horsman =

Horsman is a surname. Notable people with the surname include:

- Bill Horsman (footballer) (1906–1982), English football player
- Bill Horsman (canoeist), British slalom canoeist
- Chris Horsman (born 1978), Welsh rugby union player
- Duane Horsman (1937–1991), American boxer
- Edward Horsman (1807–1876), British politician, Chief Secretary to Ireland
- Fred Horsman (1889–1959), English football player
- Greg Horsman, Australian dancer
- Jim Horsman (born 1935), Canadian politician
- John Whitmore Horsman (1888–1976), Canadian farmer and politician
- Kathleen Horsman (1911–1999), British artist
- Stephen Horsman, Canadian politician
- Thomas Horsman (c.1536–1610), English politician
- Vince Horsman (born 1967), Canadian baseball pitcher and coach
