= Alex Findlay =

English footballer

Personal information
- Full name: Alexander Findlay
- Date of birth: 26 December 1902
- Place of birth: Wishaw, Scotland
- Date of death: 1985 (aged 82–83)
- Position: Inside right

Senior career*
Years	Team	Apps	(Gls)
- Musselburgh Bruntonians
1929–1932	Bristol Rovers	37	(9)
1932–1935	Wrexham	22	(4)
1935–1936	Cheltenham Town		
1936–1937	Gloucester City		
1937–1938	Evesham Town		
- * Club domestic league appearances and goals

Alexander Findlay (26 December 1902 – October 1985) was a Scottish professional footballer who played as a inside right. He made appearances in the English Football League for Bristol Rovers and Wrexham.

He also played for Musselburgh Bruntonians, Cheltenham Town, Gloucester City and Evesham Town.

== Personal life ==
Findlay's older brother Bill was also a professional footballer, who played in the English Football League for Leicester City and Watford.
