= Bill Findlay (Scottish footballer) =

Scottish footballer and manager

Personal information
- Full name: William Findlay
- Date of birth: 17 February 1900
- Place of birth: Wishaw, Scotland
- Date of death: 11 June 1949 (aged 49)
- Place of death: Braunstone, England
- Height: 5 ft 8 in (1.73 m)
- Position: Wing half

Youth career
- Preston Grange Athletic

Senior career*
Years	Team	Apps	(Gls)
1921–1923	Musselburgh Bruntonians		
1923–1924	Third Lanark	23	(0)
1924–1925	Liverpool	0	(0)
1925–1932	Leicester City	100	(0)
1932–1944	Watford	128	(6)

Managerial career
- 1937–1947: Watford
- 1947–1949: Enfield
- * Club domestic league appearances and goals

William Findlay (17 February 1900 – 11 June 1949) was a Scottish professional association football player and manager, most closely associated with Watford.

== Career ==
Born in Wishaw, Lanarkshire, Findlay started his career playing for Musselburgh Bruntonians, where he won the Scottish Junior Cup and represented Scotland at junior level, then moved on to Third Lanark in the Scottish Football League's top division in 1923. A year later Third Lanark sold Findlay to English club Liverpool for a fee of £2,500, however he made no first team appearances in his single season at Anfield, and he subsequently played for Leicester City for seven years, and finally Watford, whom he also managed between 1938 and 1947.

During his tenure as manager, Watford finished fourth in the Football League Third Division South in consecutive seasons in 1937–38 and 1938–39, before the interruption of competitive football in England due to the Second World War. Although primarily the club's manager, Findlay occasionally made wartime appearances for Watford due to player shortages, playing his final game for the club at the age of 44. He became manager of Enfield in 1947, a post that he held until his death two years later.

His brother Alex was also a footballer who played for Wrexham, Bristol Rovers, Cheltenham Town and Evesham Town.

== Managerial statistics ==
Statistics are for Football League games only.

Club	From	To	P	W	D	L	F	A	Win %
Watford	January 1938	February 1947	114	50	25	39	179	152	43.86%

== See also ==
- List of Watford F.C. managers
- List of Watford F.C. players
- History of Watford F.C.
