= Thomas Barnett (footballer, born 1908) =

English footballer

Thomas Andrew Barnett (11 November 1908 – 9 July 1986), was an English professional association footballer, who played as an inside forward. During his career he was contracted to Manchester United, but never played for them. He is best remembered for his time at Watford, where he played 395 Football League games, scoring 144 goals; only Luther Blissett has scored more. At the time, he set the record for the most peacetime Watford appearances, which stood until Duncan Welbourne overtook him 35 years later. Following his retirement from football, Barnett worked as a masseur for Wembley Lions ice hockey team, and continued to support Watford as a season-ticket holder. He stood 5 ft 8 1/2 in (1.74 m) tall. He died in Watford, aged 77.
