= Arthur Betts (footballer, born 1886) =

English footballer

Arthur C Betts
Personal information
- Full name: Arthur Charles Betts
- Date of birth: 2 January 1886
- Place of birth: Scunthorpe, England
- Date of death: 1967
- Place of death: Scunthorpe, England
- Position: Left back

Senior career*
Years	Team	Apps	(Gls)
- North Lindsey
1905–1907	Gainsborough Trinity	64	(1)
1907–1910	Watford	93	(0)
1910–1911	Gainsborough Trinity	29	(1)
1911	Newcastle United	0	(0)
1911–1914	Derby County	71	(0)
1914–1920	Hull City	51	(0)
1920–1923	Scunthorpe & Lindsey United		
1923–19xx	Normanby Park Steelworks		
Total		308	(2)
- * Club domestic league appearances and goals

Arthur Charles Betts (2 January 1886 – 1967) was an English association footballer. He played as a left back in the Football League, most notably Derby County, as well as in the Southern League with Watford. In 1911–12, Betts won the Second Division with Derby.

== Career ==
Born in Scunthorpe, Lincolnshire, Betts started his career at North Lindsey, before joining nearby Football League club Gainsborough Trinity in 1905. During this time he also represented Lincolnshire at county representative level. In 1907 Betts moved south, joining Hertfordshire side Watford of the Southern League, replacing outgoing left back Joe Brooks. Averaging over 30 games per season, he stayed at Watford for three seasons, before returning north for brief spells at Gainsborough Trinity and Newcastle United.

After failing to make Newcastle's first team, Betts transferred to Derby County in October 1911. He featured for Derby regularly, receiving a medal as they won the 1911–12 Football League Second Division, and with it a promotion to the First Division. Betts stayed at Derby until 1914, joining Hull City. Following the First World War, he finished his football career as a player at Scunthorpe & Lindsey United, a player-coach at Normanby Park Steelworks, and a coach at Lysaght Sports.
