= Taffy Davies =

Welsh footballer

Personal information
- Full name: William Davies
- Date of birth: 24 June 1910
- Place of birth: Troed-y-rhiw, Wales
- Date of death: 30 October 1995 (aged 85)
- Place of death: Watford, England
- Height: 5 ft 7 1/2 in (1.71 m)
- Position: Winger

Youth career
- New Tredegar

Senior career*
Years	Team	Apps	(Gls)
1930–1950	Watford	284	(69)

International career
1944	Wales wartime	1	(0)
- * Club domestic league appearances and goals

William "Taffy" Davies (24 June 1910 – 30 October 1995) was a Welsh professional footballer, who played as a winger or inside forward. He played his entire professional football career for English club Watford, and made an appearance for his country during a wartime international match against England.

== Playing career ==
Born in Troed-y-rhiw, Glamorgan, Davies played local football at amateur Welsh club New Tredegar, before joining Watford as an amateur in April 1930. He turned professional three months later, and stayed at Vicarage Road for the entirety of his 21-season (20 year) professional career. During that time Davies played 283 Football League games, 128 wartime matches and 29 FA Cup fixtures. He also played 13 games in the Football League Third Division South Cup, which Watford won in 1937. He played for the Wales national football team at Ninian Park on 6 May 1944, where they were defeated 2–0 by England. However, wartime internationals are not recognised by FIFA or the Football Association of Wales as official internationals, and therefore Davies did not receive a cap.

Davies was a forceful and skilful winger who not only centred the ball well but was also an excellent schemer. One match report commented: "He puts plenty of life and thought into his game … (but has) a tendency to hold his ground and pass back instead of taking a direct route to goal."

A cartilage operation in the 1937–38 season put him out of action until April 1938 and the club never recovered from his loss, missing out on promotion. Davies continued playing for Watford after the Second World War, and was the club's top scorer in the 1947–48 season, with 11 goals in all competitions.

== Later career ==
Davies retired at the end of the 1949–50 season, just before his 40th birthday. He then became the licensee of the Red Lion pub, which is situated opposite the entrance to Vicarage Road stadium. He died in Watford, Hertfordshire at the age of 85.

== Honours ==
Football League Third Division South Cup

Winner: 1937

Runner up: 1935

Watford Football Club top scorer: 1947–48

== See also ==
- List of Watford F.C. players
- History of Watford F.C.
