= Watford F.C. Player of the Season =

English soccer club award

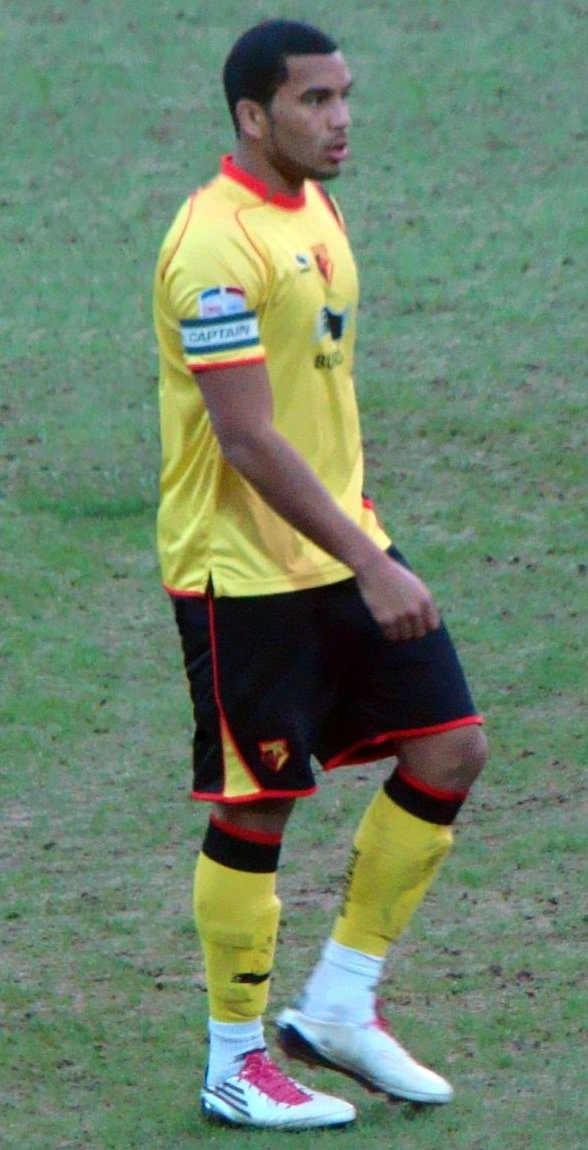
Adrian Mariappa was voted Player of the Season for 2011–12.

Watford Football Club are an English football club, from Watford, Hertfordshire. Founded in 1881 as Watford Rovers, the club has competed in the Football League since 1920 and since the 2015–16 season have competed in the Premier League. First introduced by the Watford Observer in the 1972–73 season, the Watford F.C. Player of the Season award is voted for annually by supporters of the club. It recognises the best overall performance by an individual player through the season. Winners were originally presented with the Watford Observer Trophy, but since 2016–17 the award has been named the Graham Taylor Player of the Season Award, after the club's former manager.

Goalkeeper Andy Rankin won the initial award in the 1972–73 season, ahead of Colin Franks and Duncan Welbourne. In the 1974–75 season, Rankin won the award for the second time, becoming the first of ten players to do so as of 2016. Another goalkeeper, Tony Coton, is the only player to have received the title for a third time. Coton is one of four players to have won the award in consecutive seasons, the others being Wilf Rostron in 1982–83 and 1983–84, Tommy Smith in 2007–08 and 2008–09, and most recently, Troy Deeney in 2013–14 and 2014–15. Eight winners of the award have represented their country at full international level, of whom only John McClelland went on to become Watford's Player of the Season for a second time.

Towards the end of each season, fans vote directly for the Player of the Season. Historically this has been conducted by post, but in recent years it has taken place on the Watford Observer's website. This system was earmarked for change to a match-by-match rating system in 2009, but in March 2010, the Observer decided to revert to the traditional method of voting.

Defender Mattie Pollock was awarded Player of the Season for 2025/26.

== Winners ==
† Inducted into the Watford Hall of Fame

Statistics correct at end of 2018–19 season.

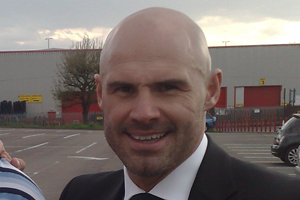
Tommy Mooney, winner in 1995–96 and 2000–01.

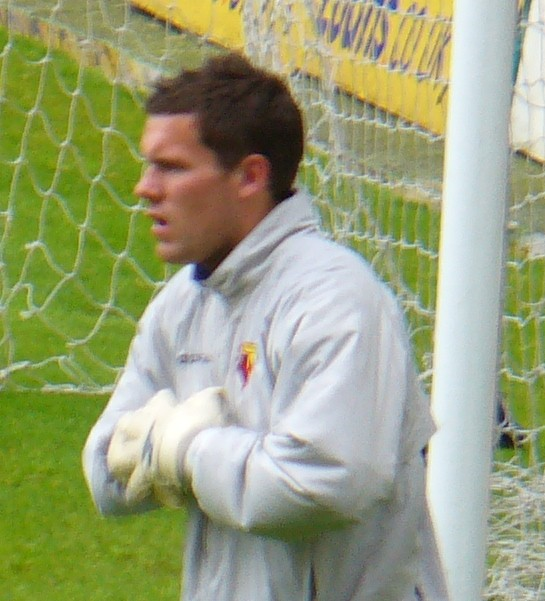
Ben Foster, winner in 2006–07.

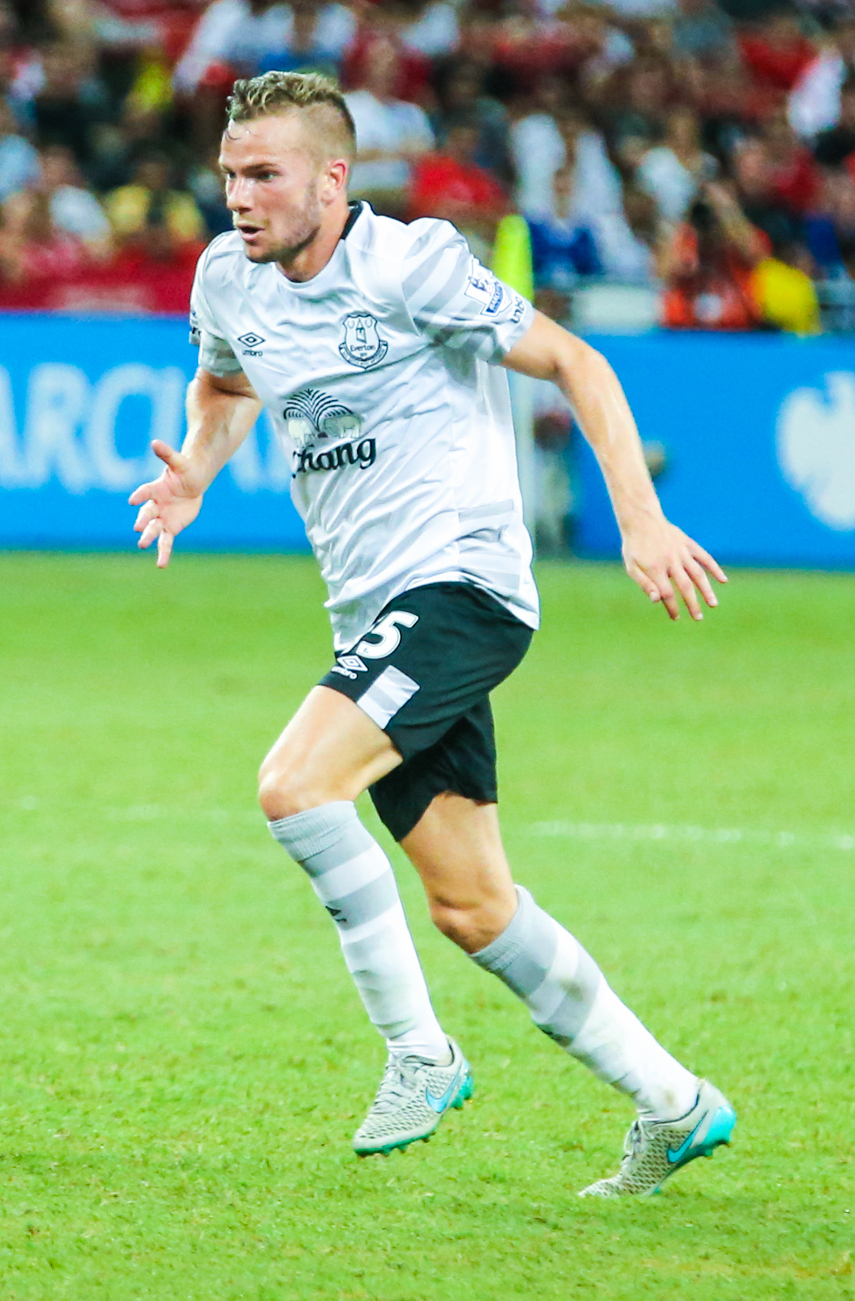
Tom Cleverley is the only player to win the award having made fewer than 50 appearances.

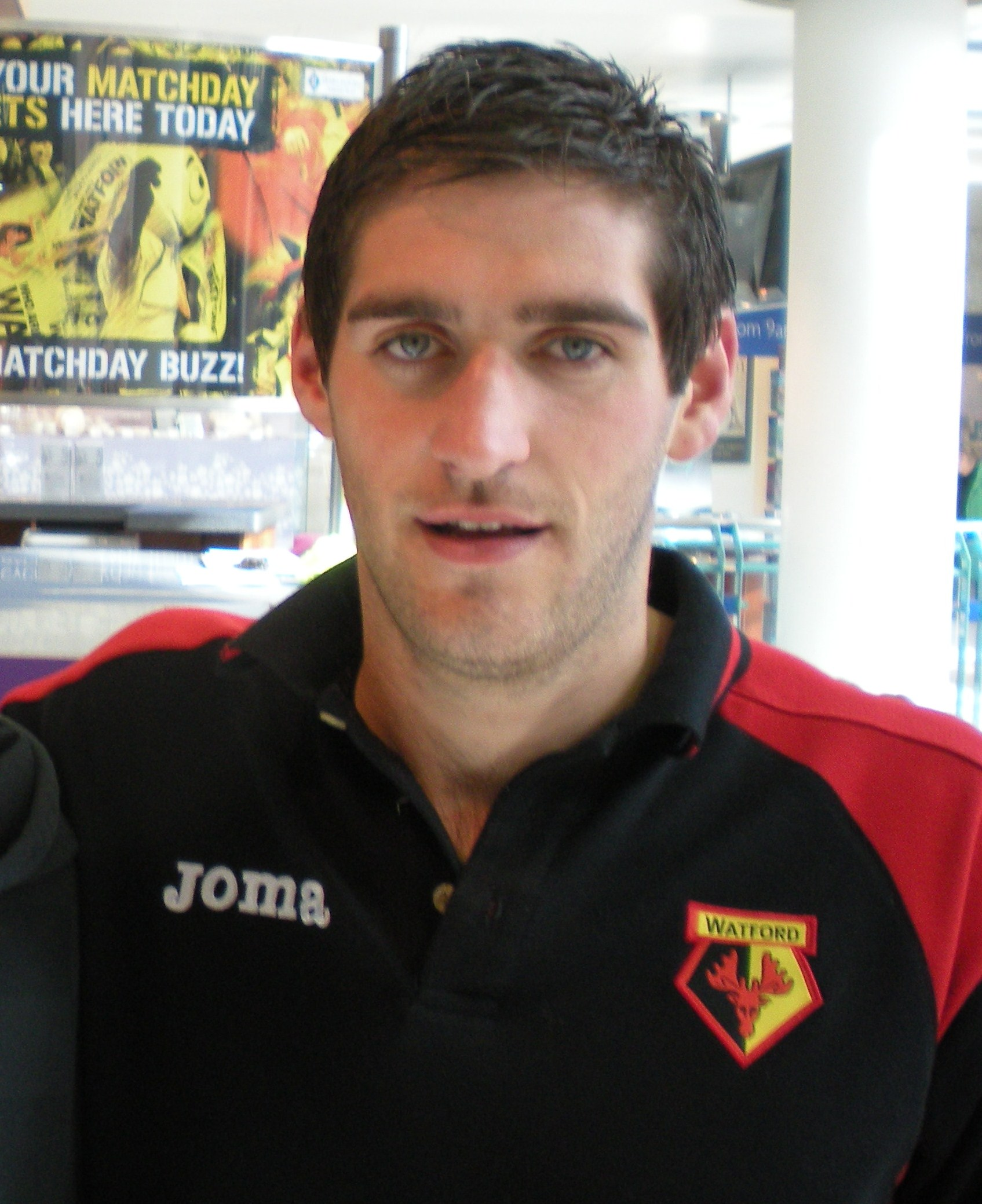
Danny Graham was the Football League Championship's top scorer in the 2010–11 season.

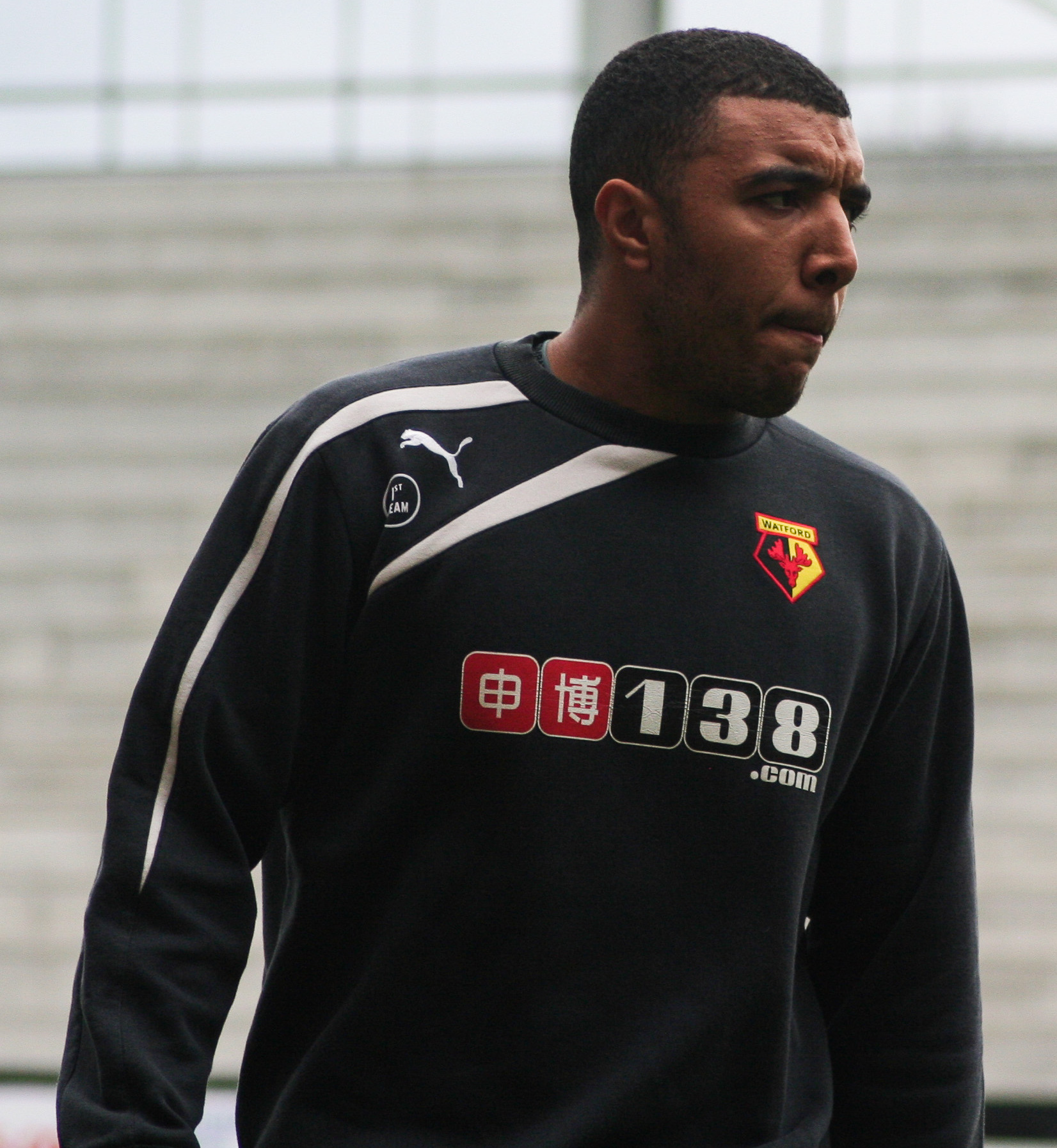
Troy Deeney won the award in consecutive seasons, in 2013–14 and 2014–15.

Watford F.C. Player of the Season winners
| Season | Level (Note: The official "Level" of competition in the structure of the English league system.) | Name | Position (Note: For a full description of positions see association football positions.) | Apps (Note: "Apps" is short for appearances, and refers to competitive first team appearances for Watford. Goals refers to competitive first team goals scored for Watford.) | Goals | National team (Note: Where a player represented his country at multiple levels, only the highest level is given.) | Notes |
|---|---|---|---|---|---|---|---|
| 1972–73 | 3 | Andy Rankin | Goalkeeper | 329 | 0 | England under-23 | |
| 1973–74 | 3 | Billy Jennings | Forward | 100 | 37 | England youth | |
| 1974–75 | 3 | Andy Rankin | Goalkeeper | 329 | 0 | England under-23 | |
| 1975–76 | 4 | Ross Jenkins | Forward | 398 | 142 | None | † (Note: Not to be confused with Ross Jenkins (footballer, born 1990), who won the Watford Young Player of the Season award in 2008–09.) |
| 1976–77 | 4 | Keith Mercer | Forward | 154 | 53 | None | |
| 1977–78 | 4 | Alan Garner | Defender | 232 | 16 | None | |
| 1978–79 | 3 | Ross Jenkins | Forward | 398 | 142 | None | † |
| 1979–80 | 2 | Ian Bolton | Defender | 287 | 36 | None | † |
| 1980–81 | 2 | Steve Sims | Defender | 219 | 8 | England B | |
| 1981–82 | 2 | Les Taylor | Midfielder | 211 | 20 | None | † |
| 1982–83 | 1 | Wilf Rostron | Defender | 404 | 30 | England schoolboys | |
| 1983–84 | 1 | Wilf Rostron | Defender | 404 | 30 | England schoolboys | |
| 1984–85 | 1 | John McClelland | Defender | 234 | 3 | Northern Ireland | † |
| 1985–86 | 1 | Tony Coton | Goalkeeper | 291 | 0 | England B | † |
| 1986–87 | 1 | Tony Coton | Goalkeeper | 291 | 0 | England B | † |
| 1987–88 | 1 | John McClelland | Defender | 234 | 3 | Northern Ireland | † |
| 1988–89 | 2 | Glyn Hodges | Midfielder | 102 | 19 | Wales | |
| 1989–90 | 2 | Tony Coton | Goalkeeper | 291 | 0 | England B | † |
| 1990–91 | 2 | David James | Goalkeeper | 98 | 0 | England | † |
| 1991–92 | 2 | Nigel Gibbs | Defender | 491 | 7 | England under-21 | † (Note: Gibbs spent his entire playing career at Watford.) |
| 1992–93 | 2 | Paul Furlong | Forward | 91 | 41 | England C | |
| 1993–94 | 2 | Gary Porter | Midfielder | 472 | 57 | England under-21 | † |
| 1994–95 | 2 | Kevin Miller | Goalkeeper | 151 | 0 | None | |
| 1995–96 | 2 | Tommy Mooney | Forward | 287 | 64 | None | † |
| 1996–97 | 3 | Kevin Miller | Goalkeeper | 151 | 0 | None | |
| 1997–98 | 3 | Alec Chamberlain | Goalkeeper | 288 | 0 | None | |
| 1998–99 | 2 | Steve Palmer | Defender | 272 | 9 | None | (Note: Palmer is listed as a defender as he played most games this season as a central defender. He has played in every position for the club.) |
| 1999–2000 | 1 | Rob Page | Defender | 252 | 3 | Wales | † |
| 2000–01 | 2 | Tommy Mooney | Forward | 287 | 64 | None | † |
| 2001–02 | 2 | Alec Chamberlain | Goalkeeper | 288 | 0 | None | |
| 2002–03 | 2 | Marcus Gayle | Defender | 115 | 9 | Jamaica | |
| 2003–04 | 2 | Gavin Mahon | Midfielder | 215 | 7 | None | |
| 2004–05 | 2 | Heiðar Helguson | Forward | 228 | 75 | Iceland | † |
| 2005–06 | 2 | Marlon King | Forward | 87 | 37 | Jamaica | |
| 2006–07 | 1 | Ben Foster | Goalkeeper | 119 | 0 | England | |
| 2007–08 | 2 | Tommy Smith | Midfielder | 306 | 64 | England under-21 | |
| 2008–09 | 2 | Tommy Smith | Midfielder | 306 | 64 | England under-21 | |
| 2009–10 | 2 | Tom Cleverley | Midfielder | 94 | 13 | England under-21 | |
| 2010–11 | 2 | Danny Graham | Forward | 98 | 41 | England under-20 | |
| 2011–12 | 2 | Adrian Mariappa | Defender | 317 | 5 | Jamaica | |
| 2012–13 | 2 | Almen Abdi | Midfielder | 92 | 23 | Switzerland | |
| 2013–14 | 2 | Troy Deeney | Forward | 371 | 123 | None | |
| 2014–15 | 2 | Troy Deeney | Forward | 371 | 123 | None | |
| 2015–16 | 1 | Heurelho Gomes | Goalkeeper | 156 | 0 | Brazil | |
| 2016–17 | 1 | Sebastian Prödl | Defender | 82 | 3 | Austria | |
| 2017–18 | 1 | Abdoulaye Doucouré | Midfielder | 102 | 13 | France under-21 | |
| 2018–19 | 1 | Etienne Capoue | Midfielder | 140 | 14 | France | |

== Statistics ==
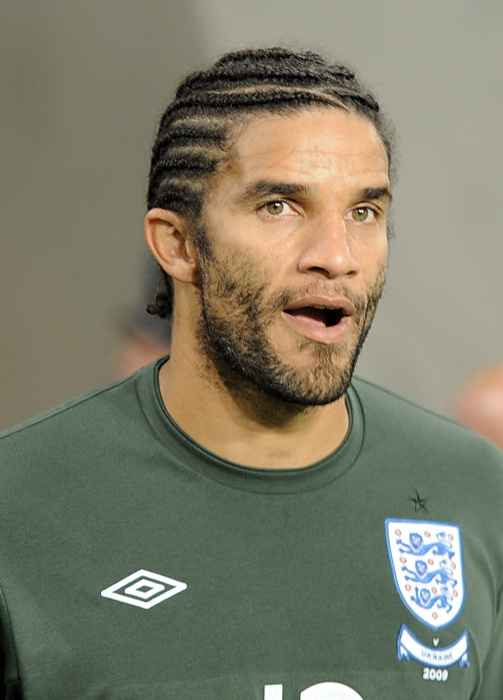
Goalkeeper David James started his career at Watford, and went on to play for England.

Wins by playing position
| Position | Number of winners (Note: Multiple winners are counted multiple times.) |
|---|---|
| Goalkeeper | 12 |
| Defender | 13 |
| Midfielder | 10 |
| Forward | 12 |

Wins by international representation
| Country | Number of winners |
|---|---|
| England | 18 |
| Jamaica | 3 |
| France | 2 |
| Northern Ireland | 2 |
| Wales | 2 |
| Austria | 1 |
| Brazil | 1 |
| Iceland | 1 |
| Switzerland | 1 |
