= Ernie Bateman =

English footballer (1929–2018)

Personal information
- Date of birth: 5 April 1929
- Place of birth: Hemel Hempstead, England
- Date of death: 18 September 2018 (aged 89)
- Position: Centre half

Senior career*
Years	Team	Apps	(Gls)
–	Hemel Hempstead		
1952–1957	Watford	23	(0)
–	Sittingbourne		
- * Club domestic league appearances and goals

Ernie Bateman (5 April 1929 – 18 September 2018) was an English professional footballer who played in the Football League as a centre half for Watford. He joined the club from Hemel Hempstead in 1952 and made 52 league appearances in the 1955–56 and 1956–57 seasons, before returning to non-league football with Sittingbourne.

Bateman's younger brother Colin also played for the same three clubs.

He died in 2018.
