= 1983–84 Blackpool F.C. season =

English football club season

Blackpool F.C.
1983–84 season
- Manager: Sam Ellis
- Division Four: 6th
- FA Cup: Fourth round
- League Cup: First round
- Top goalscorer: League: Paul Stewart (10); All: Paul Stewart & Keith Mercer (12)
Home colours

The 1983–84 season was Blackpool F.C.'s 76th season (73rd consecutive) in the Football League. They competed in the 24-team Division Four, then the bottom tier of English league football, finishing sixth.

Paul Stewart and Keith Mercer were the club's joint-top goalscorers, with twelve goals apiece.

== Table ==
| Pos | Team | Pld | W | D | L | GF | GA | GD | Pts | Promotion or qualification |
|---|---|---|---|---|---|---|---|---|---|---|
| 4 | Bristol City (P) | 46 | 24 | 10 | 12 | 70 | 44 | +26 | 82 | Promotion to the Third Division |
| 5 | Aldershot | 46 | 22 | 9 | 15 | 76 | 69 | +7 | 75 | |
| 6 | Blackpool | 46 | 21 | 9 | 16 | 70 | 52 | +18 | 72 | |
| 7 | Peterborough United | 46 | 18 | 14 | 14 | 72 | 48 | +24 | 68 | |
| 8 | Colchester United | 46 | 17 | 16 | 13 | 69 | 53 | +16 | 67 | |

(P) Promoted
