= Alan Garner (footballer) =

English footballer (1951–2020)

Personal information
- Full name: Alan Henry Garner
- Date of birth: 2 February 1951
- Place of birth: Lambeth, England
- Date of death: 23 July 2020 (aged 69)
- Position: Defender

Youth career
- Millwall

Senior career*
Years	Team	Apps	(Gls)
1969–1971	Millwall	2	(0)
1971–1975	Luton Town	88	(3)
1975–1980	Watford	200	(15)
1980–1982	Portsmouth	36	(2)
- Barnet
- * Club domestic league appearances and goals

Alan Henry Garner (2 February 1951 – 23 July 2020) was an English professional footballer best known as a player for Watford.

== Career ==
Starting out with his local team Millwall, Garner only made two league appearances before moving on to Luton Town in 1971. His time at Luton proved to be more productive, as Garner played 88 times in the league and helped Luton to promotion in 1973–74. After relegation in 1975, he was controversially sold to rivals Watford.

At Watford, Garner became a key player, appearing 200 times in the league during his five years at Vicarage Road, as well as being voted player of the season in 1977–78. Sold in 1980 to Portsmouth, he spent two years on the south coast before moving into non-League football with Barnet.
