= Colin Bateman (footballer) =

English footballer (1930–2022)

Personal information
- Date of birth: 22 October 1930
- Place of birth: Hemel Hempstead, England
- Date of death: 18 November 2022 (aged 92)
- Position: Full back

Senior career*
Years	Team	Apps	(Gls)
–	Hemel Hempstead		
1953–1958	Watford	50	(0)
–	Sittingbourne		
- * Club domestic league appearances and goals

Colin Bateman (22 October 1930 – 18 November 2022) was an English professional footballer who played in the Football League as a full back for Watford. He joined the club from Hemel Hempstead in 1953 and made 50 league appearances between the 1954–55 and 1957–58 seasons, before returning to non-league football with Sittingbourne.

Bateman's older brother Ernie also played for the same three clubs.

Bateman died on 18 November 2022, at the age of 92.
