= William Brown (footballer, born 1907) =

English footballer and sprinter

Personal information
- Full name: William Brown
- Date of birth: 27 February 1907
- Place of birth: Bishop Auckland, County Durham, England
- Date of death: 17 August 1976 (aged 69)
- Place of death: City of London, England
- Height: 5 ft 8 in (1.73 m)
- Position: Right back

Youth career
- Bishop Auckland
- Crook Town

Senior career*
Years	Team	Apps	(Gls)
1927–1928	Huddersfield Town		
1928–1935	Watford	220	(0)
1936–1939	Exeter City		
1939	Darlington		
- * Club domestic league appearances and goals

William Brown (27 February 1907 – 17 August 1976) was an English professional association footballer and sprinter. He played as a right back for Football League clubs Huddersfield Town, Watford, Exeter City and Darlington, before his playing career was interrupted by the Second World War. After its conclusion, Brown began coaching sports in the town of Apsley, becoming a football coach at nearby Hemel Hempstead Town in 1950. He continued living in Hertfordshire, and died in the City of London.

As of 2010, Brown holds the dubious distinction of having played more first team games for Watford without scoring than any other outfield player.
