= Eddie Mummery =

English footballer and coach

Albert Edward Pilkerton Mummery (18 August 1897 – 31 January 1937) was an English professional footballer, who played as an inside forward or a wing half.

== Early life ==
Born in Norwich, Mummery played for amateur clubs Lichfield and Yarmouth, before enlisting for national service during the First World War. After the war he joined Coalville Swifts, before turning professional in 1920.

== Professional career ==
Mummery joined Watford's reserves in May 1920, advancing to the first team the following year. He played 119 Football League matches for the club, scoring 23 goals, and also played seven times in the FA Cup. Mummery scored five goals against Newport County on 5 January 1924. He remains the only Watford player to have scored 5 Football League goals in one match. Mummery played his last game for Watford in 1925. He transferred to Clapton Orient in August 1926 on a free transfer, but left to join Yarmouth three months later. He played for Yarmouth until his retirement in 1928.

== After retirement ==
Mummery became a coach at Yarmouth, a role he retained until his death. He also owned a pub in Norfolk. He died from influenza in Great Yarmouth on 31 January 1937, aged 39.
