= Scotland national youth football team =

The Scotland national youth football teams are a group of six teams that represents Scotland in association football at various specific age levels, ranging from under-16 to under-21. All of the teams are controlled by Scottish Football Association, the governing body for football in Scotland.

The six teams are the following:

- Scotland national under-21 football team
- Scotland national under-20 football team
- Scotland national under-19 football team
- Scotland national under-18 football team
- Scotland national under-17 football team
- Scotland national under-16 football team
