= Thomas Walter =

Thomas Walter may refer to:

- Thomas Walter (botanist) (1740–1789), British-born American botanist
- Thomas Ustick Walter (1804–1887), American architect
- Tom Walter, American college baseball coach

== See also ==
- Tom Walters (disambiguation)
