= Duncan Welbourne =

English footballer, coach, and manager (1940–2019)

Duncan Welbourne (28 July 1940 – 14 January 2019) was an English professional football player, coach and manager.

== Early life ==
Born in Scunthorpe, Lincolnshire, he began his career as an amateur at Scunthorpe United. He started his professional career at Grimsby, as a wing half. In November 1963 he transferred to Watford, for a fee of £1,300. At Watford he converted to a full back, when the club started playing in a 4–4–2 formation. Welbourne set what was then a Watford record of 457 competitive appearances, breaking the 35-year-old record previously held by Tommy Barnett. His 280 consecutive Football League games remains a record. After finishing third in the club's inaugural Player of the Season award in 1972–73, Welbourne left Watford on a free transfer at the end of the 1973–74 season. He joined Southport, where he finished his playing career. He also took on a coaching role, and managed the team between September 1975 and January 1976.

Welbourne died on the morning of 14 January 2019, as confirmed by Watford

He won a Division Three championship medal; a fourth-place FA Cup medal but his most treasured possession was a testimonial present of a gold disc awarded for the song Goodbye Yellow Brick Road, presented by Elton John, then director, with the inscription: "To Duncan: something to keep you close to Watfordand myself."
