= Evesham Town F.C. =

Former association football club in Worcestershire, England

Evesham Town
- Full name: Evesham Town F.C.
- Nickname: the Robins
- Founded: 1919
- Dissolved: 1938
- Ground: Crown Meadow
| 1919–35 colours | 1935–38 colours |

Evesham Town F.C was an association football club from Evesham, Worcestershire, active before the Second World War.

== History ==
The club played its first match against the Norton Barracks, in front of 200 spectators, in February 1891. The club played at a minor level until 1906.

The club re-formed in 1919 and by November was attracting 2,000 spectators for home matches in the Worcestershire League. It took a major step in 1921 by entering the FA Amateur Cup for the first time and reached the final of the 1922–23 competition, losing 2–1 to London Caledonians after extra-time, in front of a crowd of 15,000.

The Robins joined the Birmingham Combination in 1926–27, their best season coming in 1930–31, when they were runners-up to Nuneaton Town; the key match between the two sides, at Crown Meadow in April, saw Nuneaton win with a late penalty, while Evesham hit the woodwork three times and missed a penalty.

The two clubs met in the final of the Birmingham Senior Cup in the same season, Evesham again coming up short, losing 4–2 in a replay at Highfield Road, Barnett in the Evesham goal also saving two penalties; in the original match, with the score at 1–1 and Evesham dominating, Knight was forced to leave the pitch because of a head injury, and Evesham had to finish with ten men.

The club suffered a serious blow in 1935 when a storm demolished the wood and corrugated iron stand at the Crown Meadow. The club was already £120 in debt, which would increase to £250 the following year, and would make a trading loss in 1937–38 of £130. Its final demise came at the start of the 1938–39 season, the club having to resign from the Birmingham Combination, with gate receipts averaging only £11 per match. A new club, Evesham United, started up after the war as a replacement.

== Colours ==
The club originally played in red shirts (from which it took its nickname the Robins), white shorts, and black socks. In October 1935, due to the club's financial difficulties, it accepted a new set of colours donated by the supporters' club of white shirts and black shorts, with a robin badge, and hooped socks.

== Ground ==
The club played at the Crown Meadow.
