= Joe Brooks (footballer, fl. 1902–1915) =

English footballer

Personal information
- Full name: Joseph Brooks
- Place of birth: Stalybridge, Cheshire, England
- Position: Full back

Senior career*
Years	Team	Apps	(Gls)
- Stalybridge Rovers
1902–1903	Glossop		
1903–1907	Watford	106	(0)
1907–1912	Sheffield United		
1912–1915	Stalybridge Celtic		
- * Club domestic league appearances and goals

Joe Brooks was a footballer from Stalybridge, England. He played in the Football League for Glossop and Sheffield United, and the Southern League for Watford and Stalybridge Celtic. Early in his career, Brooks also played for his hometown's previous club, Stalybridge Rovers prior to its dissolution.
