= Keith Mercer =

English footballer

Personal information
- Date of birth: 14 October 1956 (age 70)
- Place of birth: Lewisham, England
- Height: 5 ft 10 in (1.78 m)
- Position: Striker

Youth career
- Watford

Senior career*
Years	Team	Apps	(Gls)
1972–1980	Watford	134	(46)
1980–1983	Southend United	131	(35)
1983–1984	Blackpool	31	(9)
Total		296	(90)
- * Club domestic league appearances and goals

Keith Mercer (born 1956) is an English former footballer who played as a striker for Watford, Southend United and Blackpool.

== Career ==
Mercer began his career at Watford where he was a product of their youth team. He made his debut at 16 years 125 days old on 15 February 1973 as a substitute against Tranmere Rovers, when he became the youngest ever player to play for the Hornets, a record which still stands. He was still at school and Watford had to obtain permission from his headmaster to play.

His full debut didn't come until a year later in 1974, however he did score. In the 1976–77 season he averaged a goal every two games and was voted both the "Young Player of the Season" and "Player of the Season". In the 1977–78 season after he suffered a knee ligament injury in September before a recurrence in December put him out of action for four months. He then caught pneumonia, but still scored thirteen goals that season. At the start of the following season, Mercer was still first-choice striker, but was then injured in a game against Exeter City. Then three games into his comeback, he had to come off the pitch with ankle trouble. In February 1980, after 134 games and 46 goals for the Hornets he was sold to Southend United.

In 1983 Mercer signed for Blackpool, and was joint top scorer with Paul Stewart in the 1983–84 season as the Seasiders finished sixth in the Fourth Division. However, he retired in 1984 at the age of 28 with a knee injury.

== Post-retirement ==
After he retired from playing football, Mercer stayed on the Fylde coast, living in Poulton-le-Fylde. He worked as a taxi-driver in Blackpool and, until returning to Watford, he still attended and supports the Seasiders at Bloomfield Road.

== Honours ==
Watford

- Fourth Division: 1977-78

Southend United

- Football League Fourth Division: 1980–81
