= Fred Horsman =

English footballer

Personal information
- Full name: Frederick Horsman
- Date of birth: 12 December 1889
- Place of birth: Leeds, England
- Date of death: 15 May 1959 (aged 69)
- Place of death: Watford, England
- Height: 5 ft 10 1/2 in (1.79 m)
- Position: Full back

Senior career*
Years	Team	Apps	(Gls)
1909	Ilkeston United		
1910–1912	Mansfield Town		
1913–1914	Grantham Avenue		
1919–1924	Watford	132	(0)
1924–1925	Doncaster Rovers	38	(0)
1925	Peterborough & Fletton United		
1925	Luton Town		
1925–1927	Ashford Railway Works		
1927–1928	Chatham		
- * Club domestic league appearances and goals

Frederick Horsman (12 December 1889 – 15 May 1959) was an English professional footballer who played as a full back and made 138 appearances in the Football League for Watford and Doncaster Rovers.

Prior to World War I he played for two seasons with Mansfield Town as they moved from the Notts & Derbyshire League on to the Central Alliance for the 1911–12 season. He then played for Grantham Avenue who were the 1913–14 Central Alliance runners-up.

After the end of the war he joined Watford for a five season spell: in the first season, when he played in 32 league matches, they were runners-up of the Southern League Division 1 and then the club joined the newly formed Football League Third Division South. He played in Watford's first ever Football League match, a 2–1 win against Queens Park Rangers on 28 August 1920. Whilst with Watford he was picked for an F.A. representative side to play Cambridge University. After leaving Watford he played for Football League Third Division North club Doncaster Rovers for the 1924–25 season.

He started the 1925–26 season with Peterborough & Fletton United but shortly moved on to Luton Town where he played reserve team football during his two month stay. His registration with Luton was cancelled by mid December 1925 and later that month he was playing with Kent League club Ashford Railway Works. He was team captain of the Railway Works team for the 1926–27 campaign. Thereafter he played throughout the 1927–28 season with Chatham featuring in their Kent League reserves team.

In an interview published in October 1926 he stated that he had gained experience prior to World War I with Notts County and in his career he was selected on two occasions for the Southern League representative team.
