= Tom Walters (association footballer) =

Welsh footballers

Personal information
- Full name: Thomas Charles Walters
- Date of birth: 15 June 1909
- Place of birth: Trealaw, Glamorgan
- Date of death: 27 January 1968 (aged 58)
- Place of death: Torquay, Devon
- Height: 5 ft 10 1/2 in (1.79 m)
- Position: Centre forward

Senior career*
Years	Team	Apps	(Gls)
- Merthyr Town
1930–1932	Bolton Wanderers		
1932–1933	Crystal Palace		
1933	Exeter City		
1933–1935	Torquay United		
1935–1938	Watford	57	(24)
1938–1939	Leyton Orient		
1939–1940	Dartford		
1940–1942	Watford	0	(0)
- * Club domestic league appearances and goals

Thomas Charles Walters (15 June 1909 – 27 January 1968) was a Welsh professional footballer. He played as a centre forward in the Football League for Merthyr Town, Bolton Wanderers, Crystal Palace, Exeter City, Torquay United, Watford and Clapton Orient, as well as in the Southern League for Dartford.

== Career ==
Born in Trealaw, Glamorgan, Walters started his working life as a coal miner, as well as a footballer for Merthyr Town. He moved to England shortly before his 21st birthday, joining Bolton Wanderers in May 1930, and later spending time at Crystal Palace, Exeter City and Torquay United.

Walters joined Third Division South side Watford in 1935. He scored the only goal of the game on his debut, an away match at Bristol Rovers on 19 October 1935, and also scored in the next two consecutive games. He only played two further matches between November and March, but finished the season in strong goalscoring form, with two hat-tricks and two further goals in the last nine games of the season. Walters played 28 games the following season, scoring 9 goals, including Watford's goal in the second leg of the Third Division South Cup final, which they drew 3–3 on aggregate with Millwall, thus sharing the trophy. In 1937–38, his last season at the club, he played 21 matches, scoring 11 goals.

After leaving Watford, Walters joined Clapton Orient on a free transfer in June 1938, and joined Dartford a year later. He returned to Watford in 1940. The Football League was suspended due to the Second World War, but Walters made 34 appearances in wartime matches, scoring 16 goals. Following the war, Walters spent the remainder of his life as a publican. He died on 27 January 1968, aged 58.
