= Ross Jenkins (footballer, born 1951) =

English footballer

Personal information
- Full name: Ross Anthony Jenkins
- Date of birth: 4 November 1951 (age 74)
- Place of birth: Kensington, London, England
- Position: Forward

Youth career
- 1968–1969: Crystal Palace

Senior career*
Years	Team	Apps	(Gls)
1969–1972	Crystal Palace	15	(2)
1972–1983	Watford	339	(118)
1981	→ Washington Diplomats (loan)	29	(6)
1983–1984	Eastern AA		
Total		383	(126)
- * Club domestic league appearances and goals

Ross Anthony Jenkins (born 4 November 1951 in Kensington, London) is an English retired footballer, who played as a forward. He started his career at Crystal Palace, before spending eleven years with Watford. He played for the club whilst they were both bottom and top of The Football League.

== Playing career ==
Jenkins became an apprentice at Crystal Palace in July 1968, signing professional terms in November 1969. In November 1972 he was bought by Watford manager George Kirby for a then club-record fee of £30,000 initially, with £5000 to come a year later. Kirby had made a series of unsuccessful bids for other players before signing Jenkins.

Jenkins' debut coincided with the club's first away win in 18 months. However, he was unable to score until late in the season, his two goals in a 5–1 win over Scunthorpe United being greeted with ironic applause from his supporters. The following season, under new manager Mike Keen, Jenkins only scored four goals in 26 appearances.

Watford were relegated from the Third Division in 1974–75 season, with Jenkins finishing top scorer with 11 goals in 34 appearances. In the summer of 1975 Jenkins chose to turn down a transfer to Huddersfield Town for a fee of £12,000.

After a 1–0 defeat to Darlington, which Jenkins played in, their fourth game and defeat of the 1975–76 season Watford were bottom of the Fourth Division. The club had a strong second half of the season and finished eighth, with Jenkins top-scorer with 19 goals. His achievements saw him win the player of the season award.

In summer 1977 Keen was sacked and Graham Taylor was brought in. Under Taylor Watford advanced through the leagues, with Jenkins in the side. They were promoted from the Fourth Division in 1977–78, the Third in 1978–79 and the Second in 1981–82. Jenkins played in their first game in the top flight, a 2–0 win at home to Everton and early in the 1982–83 Watford topped the league. They eventually finished second to Liverpool and Jenkins left Watford at the end of the season to play in Hong Kong.

== Coaching career ==
In 1987, Jenkins briefly returned to Watford as a coach, under Dave Bassett's management.

== Personal ==
Jenkins is no relation to the player of the same name who played for Watford between 2008 and 2014.
