= Ian Bolton =

English footballer

Personal information
- Full name: Ian Robert Bolton
- Date of birth: 13 July 1953 (age 73)
- Place of birth: Leicester, England
- Position: Central defender

Youth career
- 19??–1972: Birmingham City

Senior career*
Years	Team	Apps	(Gls)
1972–1977	Notts County	70	(4)
1976	→ Lincoln City (loan)	1	(0)
1977–1983	Watford	234	(28)
1983–1984	Brentford	14	(1)
–	Barnet		
–	Kingsbury Town		
1987–1988	Hayes		
–	Chalfont St Peter		
- * Club domestic league appearances and goals

Ian Robert Bolton (born 13 July 1953) is an English former professional footballer who played in the Football League as a central defender for Notts County, Lincoln City, Watford and Brentford.

Bolton was born in Leicester and began his career as an apprentice with Birmingham City. He turned professional on joining Notts County in March 1972. He joined Lincoln City on loan in August 1976 and transferred to Watford in August 1977 for a fee of £12,500. He was described by manager Graham Taylor as the best signing he made and played for Watford, in both midfield and defence, as they climbed from the Fourth Division to the top flight.

He moved to Brentford in December 1983, subsequently playing non-league football for Barnet and Kingsbury Town from whom he joined Hayes in 1987. After leaving Hayes he joined Chalfont St Peter.
