= 1988–89 AFC Bournemouth season =

Bournemouth
1988–89 season
- Manager: Harry Redknapp
- Stadium: Dean Court
- Second Division: 12th
- FA Cup: Fifth Round
- League Cup: Second Round
- Full Members' Cup: First Round

During the 1988–89 English football season, AFC Bournemouth competed in the Football League Second Division.

== Final league table ==
| Pos | Team | Pld | W | D | L | GF | GA | GD | Pts |
|---|---|---|---|---|---|---|---|---|---|
| 10 | Leeds United | 46 | 17 | 16 | 13 | 59 | 50 | +9 | 67 |
| 11 | Sunderland | 46 | 16 | 15 | 15 | 60 | 60 | 0 | 63 |
| 12 | Bournemouth | 46 | 18 | 8 | 20 | 53 | 62 | −9 | 62 |
| 13 | Stoke City | 46 | 15 | 14 | 17 | 57 | 72 | −15 | 59 |
| 14 | Bradford City | 46 | 13 | 17 | 16 | 52 | 59 | −7 | 56 |

Source: thestatcat.co.uk
Rules for classification: 1) Points; 2) Goal difference; 3) Goals scored

== Results ==
Bournemouth's score comes first

=== Legend ===
| Win | Draw | Loss |

=== Football League Second Division ===
| Date | Opponent | Venue | Result | Attendance |
|---|---|---|---|---|
| 27 August 1988 | Sunderland | A | 1–1 | 17,998 |
| 3 September 1988 | Chelsea | H | 1–0 | 8,763 |
| 10 September 1988 | Brighton & Hove Albion | A | 2–1 | 8,247 |
| 17 September 1988 | Leeds United | H | 0–0 | 7,922 |
| 20 September 1988 | Swindon Town | A | 1–3 | 8,055 |
| 24 September 1988 | Oxford United | H | 2–1 | 6,532 |
| 1 October 1988 | Stoke City | A | 1–2 | 7,485 |
| 5 October 1988 | West Bromwich Albion | A | 0–0 | 7,248 |
| 8 October 1988 | Birmingham City | A | 0–1 | 6,186 |
| 15 October 1988 | Portsmouth | A | 1–2 | 12,801 |
| 21 October 1988 | Shrewsbury Town | H | 0–1 | 5,449 |
| 25 October 1988 | Oldham Athletic | A | 0–2 | 4,518 |
| 29 October 1988 | Ipswich Town | H | 1–0 | 6,648 |
| 5 November 1988 | Bradford City | A | 1–0 | 9,067 |
| 12 November 1988 | Crystal Palace | H | 2–0 | 8,697 |
| 19 November 1988 | Manchester City | H | 0–1 | 9,500 |
| 26 November 1988 | Barnsley | A | 2–5 | 4,937 |
| 29 November 1988 | Hull City | H | 5–1 | 5,420 |
| 3 December 1988 | Blackburn Rovers | H | 2–1 | 8,418 |
| 10 December 1988 | Plymouth Argyle | A | 1–1 | 10,619 |
| 17 December 1988 | Walsall | H | 2–1 | 6,985 |
| 26 December 1988 | Leicester City | A | 1–0 | 13,896 |
| 31 December 1988 | Watford | A | 0–1 | 14,006 |
| 2 January 1989 | Brighton & Hove Albion | H | 2–1 | 10,627 |
| 14 January 1989 | Hull City | A | 0–4 | 5,690 |
| 21 January 1989 | Sunderland | H | 0–1 | 8,992 |
| 4 February 1989 | West Bromwich Albion | H | 2–1 | 11,571 |
| 11 February 1989 | Birmingham City | A | 1–0 | 6,444 |
| 25 February 1989 | Portsmouth | H | 1–0 | 9,959 |
| 28 February 1989 | Oldham Athletic | H | 2–2 | 7,783 |
| 4 March 1989 | Crystal Palace | A | 3–2 | 10,022 |
| 11 March 1989 | Bradford City | H | 3–0 | 8,122 |
| 14 March 1989 | Ipswich Town | A | 1–3 | 10,747 |
| 18 March 1989 | Swindon Town | H | 2–3 | 9,752 |
| 25 March 1989 | Chelsea | A | 0–2 | 22,467 |
| 27 March 1989 | Leicester City | H | 2–1 | 8,913 |
| 1 April 1989 | Leeds United | A | 0–3 | 21,095 |
| 4 April 1989 | Walsall | A | 1–1 | 3,619 |
| 8 April 1989 | Watford | H | 0–1 | 9,766 |
| 11 April 1989 | Shrewsbury Town | A | 0–1 | 2,457 |
| 15 April 1989 | Stoke City | H | 0–1 | 6,834 |
| 22 April 1989 | Oxford United | A | 1–3 | 5,684 |
| 29 April 1989 | Barnsley | H | 3–2 | 5,520 |
| 1 May 1989 | Blackburn Rovers | A | 0–2 | 9,345 |
| 6 May 1989 | Manchester City | A | 3–3 | 30,564 |
| 13 May 1989 | Plymouth Argyle | H | 0–0 | 7,230 |

=== FA Cup ===
| Round | Date | Opponent | Venue | Result |
|---|---|---|---|---|
| R3 | 7 January 1989 | Blackpool | A | 1–0 |
| R4 | 28 January 1989 | Hartlepool United | A | 1–1 |
| R4R | 31 January 1989 | Hartlepool United | H | 5–2 |
| R5 | 18 February 1989 | Manchester United | H | 1–1 |
| R5R | 28 February 1989 | Manchester United | A | 0–1 |

=== League Cup ===
| Round | Date | Opponent | Venue | Result | Attendance | Notes |
|---|---|---|---|---|---|---|
| R1 1st Leg | 30 August 1988 | Bristol Rovers | H | 1–0 | 4,601 | |
| R1 2nd Leg | 7 September 1988 | Bristol Rovers | A | 0–0 | 4,057 | Bournemouth won 1–0 on aggregate |
| R2 1st Leg | 27 September 1988 | Coventry City | H | 0–4 | 6,543 | |
| R2 2nd Leg | 11 October 1988 | Coventry City | A | 1–3 | 7,212 | Coventry won 7–1 on aggregate |

=== Full Members' Cup ===
| Round | Date | Opponent | Venue | Result | Attendance |
|---|---|---|---|---|---|
| 1R | 9 November 1988 | Derby County | H | 0–1 | 7,847 |

== Squad ==
Note: Flags indicate national team as defined under FIFA eligibility rules; some limited exceptions apply. Players may hold more than one non-FIFA nationality.

| Pos. | Nation | Player |
|---|---|---|
| GK | IRL | Gerry Peyton |
| GK | ENG | John Smeulders |
| DF | ENG | Kevin Bond |
| DF | ENG | John Williams |
| DF | ENG | Mark Newson |
| DF | ENG | Mark Whitlock |
| DF | ENG | Shaun Teale |
| DF | ENG | Denny Mundee |
| DF | ENG | David Coleman |
| DF | WAL | Tony Pulis |
| DF | ENG | Paul Morrell |
| MF | ENG | Ian Bishop |
| MF | ENG | Shaun Brooks |

| Pos. | Nation | Player |
|---|---|---|
| MF | ENG | Matty Holmes |
| MF | IRL | Mark O'Connor |
| MF | ENG | Peter Shearer |
| MF | IRL | Sean O'Driscoll |
| MF | ENG | Richard Cooke |
| FW | ENG | Trevor Aylott |
| FW | ENG | Bobby Barnes |
| FW | ENG | Luther Blissett |
| FW | NIR | Colin Clarke (on loan from Southampton) |
| FW | ENG | Shaun Close |
| FW | ENG | David Puckett |
| FW | JAM | Carl Richards |
