= 1987–88 AFC Bournemouth season =

Bournemouth
1987–88 season
- Manager: Harry Redknapp
- Stadium: Dean Court
- Second Division: 17th
- FA Cup: Third round
- League Cup: Third round
- Full Members' Cup: First round

During the 1987–88 English football season, AFC Bournemouth competed in the Football League Second Division.

== Final league table ==
Pos	Team	Pld	W	D	L	GF	GA	GD	Pts
15	Hull City	44	14	15	15	54	60	−6	57
16	Plymouth Argyle	44	16	8	20	65	67	−2	56
17	Bournemouth	44	13	10	21	56	68	−12	49
18	Shrewsbury Town	44	11	16	17	42	54	−12	49
19	Birmingham City	44	11	15	18	41	66	−25	48

Rules for classification: 1) Points; 2) Goal difference; 3) Goals scored

== Results ==
Bournemouth's score comes first

=== Legend ===
Win	Draw	Loss

=== Football League Second Division ===
Date	Opponent	Venue	Result	Attendance
15 August 1987	Sheffield United	A	1–0	9,757
22 August 1987	Bradford City	H	2–0	7,407
29 August 1987	Birmingham City	A	1–1	8,284
31 August 1987	Barnsley	H	1–2	7,486
5 September 1987	Hull City	A	1–2	5,807
12 September 1987	Reading	H	3–0	7,597
15 September 1987	Middlesbrough	A	0–3	9,660
19 September 1987	West Bromwich Albion	A	0–3	7,749
26 September 1987	Leicester City	A	2–3	7,969
29 September 1987	Plymouth Argyle	H	2–2	6,491
3 October 1987	Stoke City	A	0–1	8,104
10 October 1987	Blackburn Rovers	H	1–1	6,789
17 October 1987	Aston Villa	A	1–1	15,145
20 October 1987	Shrewsbury Town	H	2–0	5,587
24 October 1987	Leeds United	A	2–3	15,253
31 October 1987	Ipswich Town	H	1–1	8,105
3 November 1987	Millwall	A	2–1	5,734
7 November 1987	Crystal Palace	H	2–3	9,083
21 November 1987	Huddersfield Town	H	0–2	6,419
28 November 1987	Swindon Town	A	2–4	7,934
1 December 1987	Manchester City	H	0–2	9,499
5 December 1987	Oldham Athletic	H	2–2	5,777
12 December 1987	Bradford City	A	0–2	10,763
19 December 1987	Middlesbrough	H	0–0	6,792
26 December 1987	Leicester City	A	1–0	11,452
28 December 1987	West Bromwich Albion	H	3–2	8,969
1 January 1988	Birmingham City	H	4–2	7,963
16 January 1988	Sheffield United	H	1–2	6,466
6 February 1988	Hull City	H	6–2	5,901
13 February 1988	Manchester City	A	0–2	16,161
27 February 1988	Stoke City	H	0–0	6,871
5 March 1988	Aston Villa	H	1–2	10,057
8 March 1988	Barnsley	A	1–2	6,140
12 March 1988	Blackburn Rovers	A	1–3	10,807
19 March 1988	Ipswich Town	A	2–1	10,208
26 March 1988	Leeds United	H	0–0	9,147
2 April 1988	Crystal Palace	A	0–3	9,557
8 April 1988	Shrewsbury Town	A	1–2	7,106
13 April 1988	Reading	A	0–0	10,274
19 April 1988	Millwall	H	1–2	9,204
26 April 1988	Plymouth Argyle	A	2–1	6,310
30 April 1988	Huddersfield Town	A	1–1	2,794
2 May 1988	Swindon Town	H	2–0	5,212
7 May 1988	Oldham Athletic	A	0–2	6,009

=== FA Cup ===
Round	Date	Opponent	Venue	Result
R3	9 January 1988	Brighton & Hove Albion	A	0–2

=== League Cup ===
Round	Date	Opponent	Venue	Result	Notes
R1 1st Leg	18 August 1987	Exeter City	H	1–1	
R1 2nd Leg	26 August 1987	Exeter City	A	3–1	Bournemouth won 4–2 on aggregate
R2 1st Leg	22 September 1987	Southampton	H	1–0	
R2 2nd Leg	6 October 1987	Southampton	A	2–2	Bournemouth won 3–2 on aggregate
R3	27 October 1987	Arsenal	A	0–3	

=== Full Members' Cup ===
Round	Date	Opponent	Venue	Result	Attendance
1R	10 November 1987	Sheffield Wednesday	A	0–2	3,756

== Squad ==
Note: Flags indicate national team as defined under FIFA eligibility rules; some limited exceptions apply. Players may hold more than one non-FIFA nationality.

Pos.	Nation	Player
GK	IRL	Gerry Peyton
GK	ENG	John Smeulders
DF	ENG	John Williams
DF	IRL	Dave Langan
DF	ENG	Mark Newson
DF	ENG	Mark Whitlock
DF	ENG	Billy Clark
DF	ENG	David Coleman
DF	WAL	Tony Pulis
DF	ENG	Paul Morrell
MF	ENG	Shaun Brooks
MF	ENG	David Armstrong

Pos.	Nation	Player
MF	IRL	Mark O'Connor
MF	IRL	Tommy Keane
MF	ENG	Adrian Randall
MF	ENG	Tom Heffernan
MF	IRL	Sean O'Driscoll
MF	ENG	Richard Cooke
FW	ENG	Trevor Aylott
FW	ENG	Shaun Close
FW	ENG	David Puckett
FW	JAM	Carl Richards
FW	USA	Brent Goulet
FW	SCO	Dave Shearer
