= 1989–90 AFC Bournemouth season =

Bournemouth
1989–90 season
- Manager: Harry Redknapp
- Stadium: Dean Court
- Second Division: 22nd
- FA Cup: Third round
- League Cup: Third round
- Football League Trophy: Second round

During the 1989–90 English football season, AFC Bournemouth competed in the Football League Second Division.

== Final league table ==
Pos	Team	Pld	W	D	L	GF	GA	GD	Pts	Qualification or relegation
20	West Bromwich Albion	46	12	15	19	67	71	−4	51	
21	Middlesbrough	46	13	11	22	52	63	−11	50	
22	Bournemouth (R)	46	12	12	22	57	76	−19	48	Relegation to the Third Division
23	Bradford City (R)	46	9	14	23	44	68	−24	41	Relegation to the Third Division
24	Stoke City (R)	46	6	19	21	35	63	−28	37	Relegation to the Third Division

Source: Statto
Rules for classification: 1) Points; 2) Goal difference; 3) Goals scored
(R) Relegated

== Results ==
Bournemouth's score comes first

=== Legend ===
Win	Draw	Loss

=== Football League Second Division ===
Date	Opponent	Venue	Result	Attendance
19 August 1989	Brighton & Hove Albion	A	1–2	9,685
22 August 1989	West Bromwich Albion	H	1–1	8,226
26 August 1989	Hull City	H	5–4	6,454
2 September 1989	Ipswich Town	A	1–1	11,425
9 September 1989	Newcastle United	H	2–1	9,882
16 September 1989	Middlesbrough	A	1–2	16,077
23 September 1989	Blackburn Rovers	H	2–4	7,409
26 September 1989	Port Vale	A	1–0	6,511
30 September 1989	Oxford United	A	2–1	5,325
7 October 1989	Sunderland	A	2–3	15,933
14 October 1989	Oldham Athletic	H	2–0	6,796
17 October 1989	Watford	A	2–2	9,013
21 October 1989	Portsmouth	H	0–1	9,353
1 November 1989	West Ham United	H	1–1	9,979
4 November 1989	Leeds United	A	0–3	26,484
11 November 1989	Sheffield United	H	0–1	8,481
18 November 1989	Stoke City	H	2–1	6,412
25 November 1989	Bradford City	A	0–1	7,436
2 December 1989	Brighton & Hove Albion	H	0–2	6,890
5 December 1989	Swindon Town	A	3–2	7,326
8 December 1989	West Bromwich Albion	A	2–2	9,568
16 December 1989	Barnsley	H	2–1	5,506
26 December 1989	Leicester City	A	1–2	14,128
30 December 1989	Wolverhampton Wanderers	A	1–3	15,421
1 January 1990	Plymouth Argyle	H	2–2	6,939
13 January 1990	Hull City	A	4–1	4,673
20 January 1990	Ipswich Town	H	3–1	7,464
3 February 1990	Blackburn Rovers	A	1–1	7,947
10 February 1990	Middlesbrough	H	2–2	7,630
24 February 1990	Bradford City	H	1–0	6,206
28 February 1990	Newcastle United	A	0–3	15,119
3 March 1990	Stoke City	A	0–0	10,988
6 March 1990	Oxford United	H	0–1	6,319
10 March 1990	Port Vale	A	1–1	7,131
17 March 1990	Sunderland	H	0–1	6,328
20 March 1990	Oldham Athletic	A	0–4	10,109
24 March 1990	Watford	H	0–0	6,737
31 March 1990	Portsmouth	A	1–2	8,836
3 April 1990	Wolverhampton Wanderers	H	1–1	7,448
7 April 1990	Swindon Town	H	1–2	7,772
11 April 1990	West Ham United	A	1–4	20,202
14 April 1990	Plymouth Argyle	A	0–1	7,520
17 April 1990	Leicester City	H	2–3	6,781
21 April 1990	Barnsley	A	1–0	7,415
28 April 1990	Sheffield United	A	2–4	20,994
5 May 1990	Leeds United	H	0–1	9,918

=== FA Cup ===
Round	Date	Opponent	Venue	Result
R3	6 January 1990	Sheffield United	A	0–2

=== League Cup ===
Round	Date	Opponent	Venue	Result	Attendance	Notes
R2 1st Leg	19 September 1989	Crewe Alexandra	A	1–0	3,504	
R2 2nd Leg	4 September 1989	Crewe Alexandra	H	0–0	5,343	Bournemouth won 1–0 on aggregate
R3	25 September 1989	Sunderland	A	1–1	12,595	
R3R	10 October 1989	Sunderland	H	0–1	7,349	

=== Football League Trophy ===
Round	Date	Opponent	Venue	Result	Attendance	Other
2R	28 November 1989	Chelsea	H	2–3	6,214	aet

== Squad ==
Note: Flags indicate national team as defined under FIFA eligibility rules; some limited exceptions apply. Players may hold more than one non-FIFA nationality.

Pos.	Nation	Player
GK	ENG	Phil Kite
GK	IRL	Gerry Peyton
DF	ENG	John Williams
DF	ENG	Kevin Bond
DF	ENG	Paul Miller
DF	ENG	Mark Newson
DF	ENG	Keith Rowland
DF	WAL	Neil Slatter (on loan from Oxford United)
DF	ENG	Shaun Teale
DF	ENG	Denny Mundee
DF	ENG	David Coleman
DF	ENG	Paul Morrell
MF	ENG	Shaun Brooks

Pos.	Nation	Player
MF	ENG	Matty Holmes
MF	ENG	George Lawrence
MF	IRL	Mark O'Connor
MF	ENG	Gavin Peacock
MF	ENG	Peter Shearer
MF	IRL	Sean O'Driscoll
FW	ENG	Trevor Aylott
FW	ENG	Bobby Barnes
FW	ENG	Luther Blissett
FW	ENG	Richard Cadette (on loan from Brentford)
FW	ENG	Paul Moulden
