= 1986–87 AFC Bournemouth season =

Bournemouth
1986–87 season
- Manager: Harry Redknapp
- Stadium: Dean Court
- Third Division: Champions
- FA Cup: Second Round
- League Cup: First Round
- Football League Trophy: First Round

During the 1986–87 English football season, AFC Bournemouth competed in the Football League Third Division.

== Final league table ==
Pos	Team	Pld	W	D	L	GF	GA	GD	Pts	Promotion or relegation
1	Bournemouth (C, P)	46	29	10	7	76	40	+36	97	Promotion to the Second Division
2	Middlesbrough (P)	46	28	10	8	67	30	+37	94	Promotion to the Second Division
3	Swindon Town (O, P)	46	25	12	9	77	47	+30	87	Qualification for the Third Division play-offs
4	Wigan Athletic	46	25	10	11	83	60	+23	85	Qualification for the Third Division play-offs
5	Gillingham	46	23	9	14	65	48	+17	78	Qualification for the Third Division play-offs

(C) Champions; (O) Play-off winners; (P) Promoted

== Results ==
Bournemouth's score comes first

=== Legend ===
Win	Draw	Loss

=== Football League Third Division ===
Date	Opponent	Venue	Result	Attendance
23 August 1986	Brentford	A	1–1	3,856
30 August 1986	Newport County	H	2–1	2,799
6 September 1986	Notts County	A	1–1	3,619
13 September 1986	Bolton Wanderers	H	2–1	3,031
16 September 1986	Chester City	H	2–0	3,027
20 September 1986	Mansfield Town	A	1–1	2,841
27 September 1986	Bristol City	H	2–0	5,975
30 September 1986	York City	A	0–2	3,769
4 October 1986	Darlington	A	3–0	2,006
18 October 1986	Bury	A	1–0	2,453
21 October 1986	Doncaster Rovers	H	3–2	4,195
25 October 1986	Wigan Athletic	H	3–1	4,911
1 November 1986	Middlesbrough	A	0–4	10,702
4 November 1986	Walsall	A	0–2	5,056
8 November 1986	Carlisle United	H	2–1	4,284
22 November 1986	Chesterfield	H	2–0	4,312
2 December 1986	Gillingham	H	0–2	7,756
13 December 1986	Rotherham United	A	2–4	2,092
26 December 1986	Bristol Rovers	A	3–0	3,573
27 December 1986	Fulham	H	3–2	6,670
1 January 1987	Swindon Town	H	1–0	10,537
3 January 1987	Chesterfield	A	1–1	3,029
10 January 1987	Brentford	H	1–1	4,682
24 January 1987	Notts County	H	3–0	6,022
31 January 1987	Bolton Wanderers	A	1–0	4,219
3 February 1987	Blackpool	H	1–1	6,242
7 February 1987	Chester City	A	2–2	2,838
14 February 1987	Mansfield Town	H	4–1	5,261
21 February 1987	Bristol City	A	0–2	14,539
24 February 1987	Newport County	A	1–0	2,143
28 February 1987	York City	H	3–0	5,804
3 March 1987	Middlesbrough	H	3–1	13,835
14 March 1987	Bury	H	1–0	6,806
17 March 1987	Doncaster Rovers	A	3–0	1,777
21 March 1987	Gillingham	A	1–2	7,304
28 March 1987	Darlington	H	1–0	6,370
31 March 1987	Port Vale	A	2–1	3,228
4 April 1987	Carlisle United	A	0–0	2,005
11 April 1987	Walsall	H	1–0	8,626
14 April 1987	Wigan Athletic	A	2–0	4,672
18 April 1987	Swindon Town	A	1–1	14,302
20 April 1987	Bristol Rovers	H	2–0	10,034
5 April 1987	Blackpool	A	3–1	2,866
2 May 1987	Port Vale	H	0–0	9,559
4 May 1987	Fulham	A	3–1	9,239
9 May 1987	Rotherham United	H	2–0	11,310

=== FA Cup ===
Round	Date	Opponent	Venue	Result
R1	15 November 1986	Fareham Town	H	7–2
R2	6 December 1986	Leyton Orient	A	0–1

=== League Cup ===
Round	Date	Opponent	Venue	Result	Notes
R1 1st Leg	26 August 1986	Bristol City	H	0–1	
R1 2nd Leg	2 September 1986	Bristol City	A	1–1	Bristol City won 2–1 on aggregate

=== Football League Trophy ===
Round	Date	Opponent	Venue	Result	Attendance	Notes
PR	16 December 1986	Wolverhampton Wanderers	A	3–4	1,923	
PR	6 January 1987	Cardiff City	H	1–0	1,482	
1R	28 January 1987	Swindon Town	A	2–2	4,524	Swindon won 4–2 on penalties

== Squad ==
Note: Flags indicate national team as defined under FIFA eligibility rules; some limited exceptions apply. Players may hold more than one non-FIFA nationality.

Pos.	Nation	Player
GK	IRL	Gerry Peyton
DF	ENG	Roger Brown
DF	ENG	John Williams
DF	ENG	Mark Newson
DF	ENG	Mark Whitlock
DF	ENG	Billy Clark
DF	WAL	Tony Pulis
DF	ENG	David Coleman
DF	ENG	Paul Morrell
DF	ENG	Tom Heffernan
MF	IRL	Gary Howlett
MF	IRL	Tommy Keane
MF	ENG	Morgan Lewis

Pos.	Nation	Player
MF	IRL	Mark O'Connor
MF	ENG	Adrian Randall
MF	ENG	Robbie Savage
MF	ENG	Keith Williams
MF	IRL	Sean O'Driscoll
MF	ENG	Richard Cooke
FW	ENG	Trevor Aylott
FW	ENG	David Puckett
FW	JAM	Carl Richards
MF	ENG	Shaun Brooks
MF	ENG	David Armstrong
FW	ENG	Tony Sealy
