= 1990–91 AFC Bournemouth season =

Bournemouth
1990–91 season
- Manager: Harry Redknapp
- Stadium: Dean Court
- Third Division: 9th
- FA Cup: Fourth Round
- League Cup: Second Round
- Football League Trophy: Preliminary Round

During the 1990–91 English football season, AFC Bournemouth competed in the Football League Third Division.

== Final league table ==
Pos	Team	Pld	W	D	L	GF	GA	GD	Pts	Promotion or relegation
7	Bury	46	20	13	13	67	56	+11	73	Qualification for the Third Division play-offs
8	Bradford City	46	20	10	16	62	54	+8	70	
9	Bournemouth	46	19	13	14	58	58	0	70	
10	Wigan Athletic	46	20	9	17	71	54	+17	69	
11	Huddersfield Town	46	18	13	15	57	51	+6	67	

== Results ==
Bournemouth's score comes first

=== Legend ===
Win	Draw	Loss

=== Football League Third Division ===
Date	Opponent	Venue	Result	Attendance
25 August 1990	Brentford	A	0–0	5,669
1 September 1990	Bury	H	1–1	5,285
8 September 1990	Wigan Athletic	A	0–2	2,159
15 September 1990	Stoke City	H	1–1	6,374
18 September 1990	Bradford City	H	3–1	4,942
22 September 1990	Exeter City	A	0–2	6,145
29 September 1990	Fulham	H	3–0	5,855
2 October 1990	Reading	A	1–2	5,431
5 October 1990	Southend United	A	1–2	5,255
20 October 1990	Crewe Alexandra	H	1–1	5,548
23 October 1990	Huddersfield Town	A	3–1	5,373
27 October 1990	Preston North End	A	0–0	4,953
30 October 1990	Tranmere Rovers	H	1–0	6,268
3 November 1990	Shrewsbury Town	H	3–2	5,561
10 November 1990	Rotherham United	H	4–2	5,442
24 November 1990	Birmingham City	A	0–0	7,416
1 December 1990	Chester City	A	0–0	1,103
14 December 1990	Swansea City	H	1–0	5,031
22 December 1990	Grimsby Town	A	0–5	5,651
26 December 1990	Mansfield Town	H	0–0	5,280
29 December 1990	Leyton Orient	H	2–2	6,139
1 January 1991	Bolton Wanderers	A	1–4	7,639
12 January 1991	Bury	A	4–2	2,761
19 January 1991	Brentford	H	2–0	7,167
2 February 1991	Bradford City	A	0–3	4,914
5 February 1991	Exeter City	H	2–1	4,982
16 February 1991	Birmingham City	H	1–2	6,330
23 February 1991	Rotherham United	A	1–1	4,107
27 February 1991	Stoke City	A	3–1	7,797
2 March 1991	Chester City	H	1–0	4,669
5 March 1991	Wigan Athletic	H	0–3	4,662
9 March 1991	Swansea City	A	2–1	3,086
12 March 1991	Reading	H	2–0	5,921
16 March 1991	Fulham	A	1–1	4,085
18 March 1991	Tranmere Rovers	A	0–1	5,418
23 March 1991	Southend United	H	3–1	7,421
30 March 1991	Mansfield Town	A	1–1	2,665
2 April 1991	Grimsby Town	H	2–1	7,021
6 April 1991	Leyton Orient	A	0–2	4,289
13 April 1991	Bolton Wanderers	H	1–0	7,159
16 April 1991	Cambridge United	H	0–1	7,156
20 April 1992	Crewe Alexandra	A	2–0	2,892
24 April 1991	Cambridge United	A	0–4	6,433
27 April 1991	Huddersfield Town	H	3–1	6,888
2 May 1991	Preston North End	H	0–0	7,064
11 May 1991	Shrewsbury Town	A	1–3	5,016

=== FA Cup ===
Round	Date	Opponent	Venue	Result
R1	17 November 1990	Gillingham	H	2–1
R2	8 December 1990	Hayes	H	1–0
R3	5 January 1991	Chester City	A	2–3
R4	26 January 1991	Portsmouth	A	1–5

=== League Cup ===
Round	Date	Opponent	Venue	Result	Notes
R1 1st Leg	28 August 1990	Birmingham City	A	1–0	
R1 2nd Leg	4 September 1990	Birmingham City	H	1–1	Bournemouth won 2–1 on aggregate
R2 1st Leg	25 September 1990	Millwall	A	0–0	
R2 2nd Leg	10 October 1990	Millwall	H	1–2	Millwall won 2–1 on aggregate

=== Football League Trophy ===
Round	Date	Opponent	Venue	Result
QR	6 November 1990	Gillingham	H	0–0
QR	11 December 1990	Maidstone United	A	1–3

== Squad ==
Note: Flags indicate national team as defined under FIFA eligibility rules; some limited exceptions apply. Players may hold more than one non-FIFA nationality.

Pos.	Nation	Player
GK	ENG	Peter Guthrie
GK	IRL	Gerry Peyton
DF	ENG	David Morris
DF	ENG	Kevin Bond
DF	ENG	Keith Rowland
DF	ENG	Alex Watson
DF	ENG	Denny Mundee
DF	WAL	Tony Pulis
DF	ENG	Paul Miller
DF	ENG	Shaun Teale
DF	ENG	Paul Morrell
DF	ENG	David Coleman
MF	ENG	Shaun Brooks
MF	ENG	Matty Holmes

Pos.	Nation	Player
MF	ENG	George Lawrence
MF	ENG	Paul Mitchell
MF	ENG	Gavin Peacock
MF	ENG	Jamie Redknapp
MF	ENG	Peter Shearer
MF	IRL	Sean O'Driscoll
MF	ENG	Richard Cooke
FW	ENG	Wayne Fereday
FW	ENG	Trevor Aylott
FW	ENG	Luther Blissett
FW	WAL	Andy Jones
FW	ENG	Paul Wood
FW	NGA	Efan Ekoku
