= 1991–92 AFC Bournemouth season =

Bournemouth
1991–92 season
- Manager: Harry Redknapp
- Stadium: Dean Court
- Third Division: 8th
- FA Cup: Fourth round
- League Cup: Second round
- Football League Trophy: First round

During the 1991–92 English football season, AFC Bournemouth competed in the Football League Third Division.

== Final league table ==
Pos	Team	Pld	W	D	L	GF	GA	GD	Pts	Promotion or relegation
6	Peterborough United (O, P)	46	20	14	12	65	58	+7	74	Qualification for the Third Division play-offs
7	West Bromwich Albion	46	19	14	13	64	49	+15	71	Qualification for the Second Division (Note: From the 1992–93 season, the second tier - then known as the Second Division - was renamed to the First Division, the third tier - then known as the Third Division - was renamed to the Second Division, and the fourth tier - then known as the Fourth Division - was renamed to the Third Division.)
8	Bournemouth	46	20	11	15	52	48	+4	71	Qualification for the Second Division
9	Fulham	46	19	13	14	57	53	+4	70	Qualification for the Second Division
10	Leyton Orient	46	18	11	17	62	52	+10	65	Qualification for the Second Division

(O) Play-off winners; (P) Promoted

== Results ==
Bournemouth's score comes first

=== Legend ===
Win	Draw	Loss

=== Football League Third Division ===
Date	Opponent	Venue	Result	Attendance
17 August 1991	Darlington	H	1-2	6,210
24 August 1991	Stoke City	A	1-2	10,011
31 August 1991	Hull City	H	0-0	5,015
3 September 1991	Preston North End	A	2-2	3,170
7 September 1991	Chester City	A	1-0	1,117
14 September 1991	Bolton Wanderers	H	1-2	5,614
17 September 1991	Shrewsbury Town	H	1-0	4,454
21 September 1991	Huddersfield Town	A	0-0	6,802
27 September 1991	Fulham	H	0-0	6,450
5 October 1991	Reading	A	0-0	4,033
12 October 1991	Hartlepool United	H	2-0	4,817
19 October 1991	Leyton Orient	A	1-1	3,878
26 October 1991	Bradford City	H	1-3	4,445
1 November 1991	Stockport County	H	1-0	4,649
6 November 1991	Torquay United	A	0-1	1,884
8 November 1991	Swansea City	A	1-3	2,698
22 November 1991	Brentford	H	0-0	4,764
30 November 1991	Bury	A	1-0	1,886
14 December 1991	Birmingham City	H	2-1	6,048
21 December 1991	Stoke City	H	1-2	5,436
26 December 1991	Hull City	A	1-0	4,741
28 December 1991	Darlington	A	0-0	3,172
1 January 1992	Preston North End	H	1-0	5,508
11 January 1992	West Bromwich Albion	A	0-4	10,932
18 January 1992	Wigan Athletic	H	3-0	4,338
1 February 1992	Leyton Orient	H	0-1	6,544
8 February 1992	Bradford City	A	1-3	5,820
11 February 1992	Bury	H	4-0	3,558
15 February 1992	Birmingham City	A	1-0	10,898
22 February 1992	West Bromwich Albion	H	2-1	7,721
29 February 1992	Exeter City	A	3-0	4,538
3 March 1992	Wigan Athletic	A	0-2	1,790
7 March 1992	Peterborough United	H	1-2	5,379
10 March 1992	Torquay United	H	2-1	4,083
13 March 1992	Stockport County	A	0-5	3,576
20 March 1992	Swansea City	H	3-0	4,385
24 March 1992	Exeter City	H	1-0	4,959
29 March 1992	Brentford	A	2-2	7,605
31 March 1992	Bolton Wanderers	A	2-0	4,995
3 April 1992	Chester City	H	2-0	5,974
8 April 1992	Peterborough United	A	0-2	4,910
11 April 1992	Shrewsbury Town	A	2-1	2,586
14 April 1992	Huddersfield Town	H	1-1	7,655
20 April 1992	Fulham	A	0-2	7,619
25 April 1992	Reading	H	3-2	6,486
2 May 1992	Hartlepool United	A	0-1	2,612

=== FA Cup ===
Round	Date	Opponent	Venue	Result	Other
R1	16 November 1991	Bromsgrove Rovers	H	3-1	
R2	7 December 1991	Brentford	H	2-1	
R3	4 January 1992	Newcastle United	H	0-0	
R3R	22 January 1992	Newcastle United	A	2-2	Bournemouth won 4–3 on penalties
R4	5 February 1992	Ipswich Town	A	3-0	

=== League Cup ===
Round	Date	Opponent	Venue	Result	Notes
R1 1st Leg	21 August 1991	Cardiff City	A	2-3	
R1 2nd Leg	27 August 1991	Cardiff City	H	4-1	Bournemouth won 6–4 on aggregate
R2 1st Leg	24 September 1991	Middlesbrough	A	1-1	
R2 2nd Leg	8 October 1991	Middlesbrough	H	1-2	Middlesbrough won 3–2 on aggregate

=== Football League Trophy ===
Round	Date	Opponent	Venue	Result
QR	22 October 1991	Swansea City	H	3-0
QR	10 December 1991	Cardiff City	A	3-3
R1	18 February 1992	Wrexham	H	1-2

== Squad ==
Note: Flags indicate national team as defined under FIFA eligibility rules; some limited exceptions apply. Players may hold more than one non-FIFA nationality.

Pos.	Nation	Player
GK	ENG	Vince Bartram
DF	ENG	Mark Morris
DF	ENG	Kevin Bond
DF	ENG	Keith Rowland
DF	ENG	Alex Watson
DF	ENG	Denny Mundee
DF	WAL	Tony Pulis
DF	ENG	Brian Statham (on loan from Tottenham Hotspur)
DF	ENG	Paul Morrell
MF	ENG	Steve Baker
MF	ENG	Trevor Berry
MF	ENG	Shaun Brooks
MF	ENG	Jimmy Case

Pos.	Nation	Player
MF	ENG	Matty Holmes
MF	ENG	George Lawrence
MF	NIR	Brian McGorry
MF	IRL	Sean O'Driscoll
MF	ENG	Paul Mitchell
MF	ENG	Peter Shearer
MF	ENG	Richard Cooke
FW	WAL	Andy Jones
FW	ENG	David Puckett
FW	NIR	Jimmy Quinn
FW	ENG	Wayne Fereday
FW	ENG	Paul Wood
FW	NGA	Efan Ekoku
