= 1982–83 Watford F.C. season =

English football team season

Watford
1982–83 season
- Chairman: Elton John
- Manager: Graham Taylor
- Stadium: Vicarage Road
- First Division: 2nd
- FA Cup: Fifth round
- League Cup: Third round
- Football League Trophy: Quarter-finals
- Top goalscorer: League: Luther Blissett (27); All: Luther Blissett (33)
- Highest home attendance: 27,371 v Tottenham Hotspur (Division One, 19 March 1983)
- Lowest home attendance: 3,837 v Colchester United (Football League Trophy, 17 August 1982)
- Average home league attendance: 19,454
- Biggest win: 8–0 v Sunderland (H), Division One, 25 September 1982
- Biggest defeat: 3–7 v Nottingham Forest (A), Milk Cup, 10 November 1982

During the 1982–83 English football season, Watford F.C. competed in the Football League First Division, after being promoted from the Second Division the previous season. Under Graham Taylor's management, Watford finished second in the First Division – their highest ever league finish. As a result, Watford qualified for European competition for the first time. Luther Blissett finished the season as the division's top scorer, with 27 league goals.

== Squad ==
Substitute appearances indicated in brackets

Pos.	Nat.	Name	League		Football League Trophy		Milk Cup		FA Cup		Total	
Pos.	Nat.	Name	Apps	Goals	Apps	Goals	Apps	Goals	Apps	Goals	Apps	Goals
GK	ENG	Steve Sherwood	42	0	3	0	3	0	4	0	52	0
GK	ENG	Eric Steele	0	0	1	0	0	0	0	0	1	0
DF	ENG	Ian Bolton	37	0	2	0	2(1)	0	4	0	45(1)	0
DF	ENG	Paul Franklin	1	0	0	0	0	0	0	0	1	0
DF	ENG	Charlie Palmer	0	0	1	0	0	0	0	0	1	0
DF	ENG	Alan Paris	0	0	0	0	0	0	0	0	0	0
DF	ENG	Neil Price	0	0	0(1)	0	0	0	0	0	0(1)	0
DF	SCO	Keith Pritchett	0	0	1(1)	0	0	0	0	0	1(1)	0
DF	NIR	Pat Rice	40	1	2	0	3	0	4	0	49	1
DF	ENG	Wilf Rostron	42	3	3	0	3	0	4	1	52	4
DF	ENG	Steve Sims	28	0	4	0	2	1	4	0	38	1
DF	ENG	Steve Terry	7	1	2	1	1	0	0	0	10	2
MF	ENG	John Barnes	42	10	4	2	3	0	4	1	53	13
MF	ENG	Nigel Callaghan	41	9	4	0	3	0	4	0	52	9
MF	ENG	Francis Cassidy	0	0	0	0	0	0	0	0	0	0
MF	WAL	Kenny Jackett	41	4	3	0	3	0	4	0	51	4
MF	ENG	Richard Jobson	13	1	1	0	0	0	0	0	14	1
MF	NLD	Jan Lohman	13(6)	1	1(1)	1	1	0	2(1)	2	17(8)	4
MF	ENG	Martin Patching	3	1	2(1)	0	0	0	0	0	5(1)	1
MF	ENG	Worrell Sterling	2(1)	0	0	0	0	0	0	0	2(1)	0
MF	ENG	Les Taylor	37(2)	5	0	0	3	1	4	0	44(2)	6
MF	ENG	Neil Williams	0	0	0	0	0	0	0	0	0	0
FW	NIR	Gerry Armstrong	8(11)	2	2(1)	1	0(1)	1	0(1)	0	10(14)	4
FW	ENG	Luther Blissett	41	27	4	3	3	1	4	2	52	33
FW	ENG	Jimmy Gilligan	4	2	0(1)	1	0	0	2	0	6(1)	3
FW	ENG	Ross Jenkins	18(2)	5	3	3	3	3	0	0	24(2)	11
FW	ENG	David Johnson	2(2)	0	1(1)	0	0(1)	0	0	0	3(4)	0
FW	ENG	Ian Richardson	0	0	0	0	0	0	0	0	0	0

== League table ==
Pos	Team	Pld	W	D	L	GF	GA	GD	Pts	Qualification or relegation
1	Liverpool (C)	42	24	10	8	87	37	+50	82	Qualification for the European Cup first round
2	Watford	42	22	5	15	74	57	+17	71	Qualification for the UEFA Cup first round
3	Manchester United	42	19	13	10	56	38	+18	70	Qualification for the Cup Winners' Cup first round (Note: Manchester United qualified for the European Cup Winners' Cup first round as the 1982–83 FA Cup winners.)
4	Tottenham Hotspur	42	20	9	13	65	50	+15	69	Qualification for the UEFA Cup first round
5	Nottingham Forest	42	20	9	13	62	50	+12	69	Qualification for the UEFA Cup first round

Source: World Football
Rules for classification: 1) Points; 2) Goal difference; 3) Goals scored
(C) Champions

== Results ==
=== First Division ===
28 August 1982 1	Watford	2–0	Everton	Watford
	Armstrong 22'; Rice 66'			Stadium: Vicarage Road; Attendance: 19,630

31 August 1982 2	Southampton	1–4	Watford	Southampton
	Lawrence 16'		Callaghan 12', 33'; Armstrong 48'; Jenkins 77'	Stadium: The Dell; Attendance: 19,714

4 September 1982 3	Manchester City	1–0	Watford	Manchester
	Tueart 76'			Stadium: Maine Road; Attendance: 29,617

7 September 1982 4	Watford	2–1	Swansea City	Watford
	Blissett 44' (pen.); Callaghan 66'		Stevenson 89'	Stadium: Vicarage Road; Attendance: 15,535

11 September 1982 5	Watford	3–0	West Bromwich Albion	Watford
	Blissett 39', 68'; Taylor 54'			Stadium: Vicarage Road; Attendance: 17,603

18 September 1982 6	Nottingham Forest	2–0	Watford	West Bridgford
	Walsh 20'; Birtles 75'			Stadium: City Ground; Attendance: 11,150

25 September 1982 7	Watford	8–0	Sunderland	Watford
	Callaghan 12', 23'; Blissett 26', 58', 83', 88'; Jenkins 32', 71'			Stadium: Vicarage Road; Attendance: 16,744

2 October 1982 8	Birmingham City	1–1	Watford	Birmingham
	Summerfield 89'		Blissett 4'	Stadium: St Andrew's; Attendance: 13,870

9 October 1982 9	Watford	2–2	Norwich City	Watford
	Jackett 20'; Terry 43'		Deehan 12'; Bertschin 61'	Stadium: Vicarage Road; Attendance: 18,597

16 October 1982 10	Aston Villa	3–0	Watford	Birmingham
	Withe 28'; Morley 51', 89'			Stadium: Villa Park; Attendance: 21,572

23 October 1982 11	Watford	0–0	Coventry City	Watford
				Stadium: Vicarage Road; Attendance: 17,334

30 October 1982 12	Notts County	3–2	Watford	Nottingham
	Kilcline 45'; McCulloch 51'; Hooks 81'		Blissett 29'; Barnes 31'	Stadium: Meadow Lane; Attendance: 9,171

6 November 1982 13	Tottenham Hotspur	0–1	Watford	London
			Taylor 87'	Stadium: White Hart Lane; Attendance: 42,215

13 November 1982 14	Watford	1–0	Stoke City	Watford
	Barnes 20'			Stadium: Vicarage Road; Attendance: 18,713

20 November 1982 15	Watford	4–1	Brighton & Hove Albion	Watford
	Blissett 2' (pen.), 77' (pen.); Barnes 63'; Taylor 82'		Ryan 88'	Stadium: Vicarage Road; Attendance: 16,529

27 November 1982 16	Arsenal	2–4	Watford	London
	Robson 39'; Talbot 72'		Barnes 43', 58'; Jackett 50'; Robson 76' (o.g.)	Stadium: Highbury; Attendance: 34,287

4 December 1982 17	Watford	0–1	Manchester United	Watford
			Whiteside 58'	Stadium: Vicarage Road; Attendance: 25,669

11 December 1982 18	Liverpool	3–1	Watford	Liverpool
	Rush 21'; Neal 33' (pen.), 42' (pen.)		Rostron 54'	Stadium: Anfield; Attendance: 36,690

18 December 1982 19	Watford	2–1	Ipswich Town	Watford
	Jenkins 18'; Taylor 27'		Mariner 81'	Stadium: Vicarage Road; Attendance: 18,048

27 December 1982 20	Luton Town	1–0	Watford	Luton
	Goodyear 37'			Stadium: Kenilworth Road; Attendance: 21,145

29 December 1982 21	Watford	2–1	West Ham United	Watford
	Jackett 39'; Jenkins 58'		Stewart 77' (pen.)	Stadium: Vicarage Road; Attendance: 24,870

1 January 1983 22	Brighton & Hove Albion	1–1	Watford	Hove
	Ward 85'		Jackett 79'	Stadium: Goldstone Ground; Attendance: 15,139

3 January 1983 23	Watford	2–0	Manchester City	Watford
	Gilligan 25', 37'			Stadium: Vicarage Road; Attendance: 20,049

15 January 1983 24	Everton	1–0	Watford	Liverpool
	Johnson 76'			Stadium: Goodison Park; Attendance: 19,233

22 January 1983 25	Watford	2–0	Southampton	Watford
	Nicholl 66' (o.g.); Blissett 72'			Stadium: Vicarage Road; Attendance: 17,189

6 February 1983 26	Swansea City	1–3	Watford	Swansea
	Latchford 37'		Blissett 56', 89'; Barnes 81'	Stadium: Vetch Field; Attendance: 14,461

26 February 1983 27	Watford	2–1	Aston Villa	Watford
	Blissett 7'; Rostron 88'		Walters 21'	Stadium: Vicarage Road; Attendance: 19,318

2 March 1983 28	Norwich City	3–0	Watford	Norwich
	Watson 19'; Van Wyk 76'; Deehan 88'			Stadium: Carrow Road; Attendance: 16,662

5 March 1983 29	Coventry City	0–1	Watford	Coventry
			Taylor 43'	Stadium: Highfield Road; Attendance: 11,235

12 March 1983 30	Watford	5–3	Notts County	Watford
	Blissett 10', 31', 55'; Barnes 45'; Callaghan 58'		Christie 2'; Worthington 52'; Fashanu 79'	Stadium: Vicarage Road; Attendance: 16,273

19 March 1983 31	Watford	0–1	Tottenham Hotspur	Watford
			Falco 39'	Stadium: Vicarage Road; Attendance: 27,371

22 March 1983 32	Watford	2–1	Birmingham City	Watford
	Blissett 52', 90'		Ferguson 69'	Stadium: Vicarage Road; Attendance: 14,229

26 March 1983 33	Stoke City	4–0	Watford	Stoke-on-Trent
	Thomas 12'; Painter 63'; Chamberlain 67'; McAughtrie 81'			Stadium: Victoria Ground; Attendance: 14,276

2 April 1983 34	West Ham United	2–1	Watford	London
	Van der Elst 12'; Swindlehurst 61'		Callaghan 6'	Stadium: Upton Park; Attendance: 22,647

4 April 1983 35	Watford	5–2	Luton Town	Watford
	Blissett 6', 48' (pen.); Jobson 42'; Barnes 49'; Callaghan 78'		Aylott 16'; Horton 29'	Stadium: Vicarage Road; Attendance: 20,120

9 April 1983 36	West Bromwich Albion	1–3	Watford	West Bromwich
	Jol 77'		Barnes 42'; Callaghan 64'; Lohman 71'	Stadium: The Hawthorns; Attendance: 11,828

16 April 1983 37	Watford	1–3	Nottingham Forest	Watford
	Blissett 19' (pen.)		Bowyer 47'; Hodge 56'; Davenport 69'	Stadium: Vicarage Road; Attendance: 17,537

23 April 1983 38	Manchester United	2–0	Watford	Stretford
	Cunningham 50'; Grimes 62' (pen.)			Stadium: Old Trafford; Attendance: 43,048

30 April 1983 39	Watford	2–1	Arsenal	Watford
	Barnes 64'; Blissett 75' (pen.)		McDermott 46'	Stadium: Vicarage Road; Attendance: 20,043

2 May 1983 40	Sunderland	2–2	Watford	Sunderland
	Atkins 10'; James 33'		Blissett 4', 87'	Stadium: Roker Park; Attendance: 13,971

7 May 1983 41	Ipswich Town	3–1	Watford	Ipswich
	McCall 2'; Wark 35', 72'		Rostron 62'	Stadium: Portman Road; Attendance: 19,921

14 May 1983 42	Watford	2–1	Liverpool	Watford
	Patching 40'; Blissett 49'		Johnston 62'	Stadium: Vicarage Road; Attendance: 27,148

=== Football League Trophy ===
14 August 1982 First round group A	Watford	4–1	Orient	Watford
	Jenkins 36', 42'; Gilligan 47'; Terry 82'		Rice 61' (o.g.)	Stadium: Vicarage Road; Attendance: 4,063

17 August 1982 First round group A	Watford	2–1	Colchester United	Watford
	Blissett 73'; Jenkins 79'		Allinson 80'	Stadium: Vicarage Road; Attendance: 3,837

21 August 1982 First round group A	Southend United	1–4	Watford	Southend-on-Sea
	Pennyfather 41'		May 25' (o.g.); Armstrong 55'; Lohman 70'; Blissett 87' (pen.)	Stadium: Roots Hall; Attendance: 3,837

8 December 1982 Quarter-final	Reading	5–3 (a.e.t.)	Watford	Reading
	Donnellan 31', 89', 96'; O'Sullivan 85'; Dixon 115'		Blissett 2'; Barnes 54', 75'	Stadium: Elm Park; Attendance: 3,517

=== Milk Cup ===
5 October 1982 Second round first leg	Bolton Wanderers	1–2	Watford	Bolton
	Hoggan 31'		Armstrong 40'; Jenkins 72'	Stadium: Burnden Park; Attendance: 5,664

26 October 1982 Second round second leg	Watford	2–1 (a.e.t.)	Bolton Wanderers	Watford
	Sims 99'; Blissett 106'		McGovern 23'	Stadium: Vicarage Road; Attendance: 11,520

10 November 1982 Third round	Nottingham Forest	7–3	Watford	West Bridgford
	Young 25'; Proctor 33', 77'; Birtles 40', 44'; Bowyer 67'; Wallace 84'		Jenkins 12', 42'; Taylor 69'	Stadium: City Ground; Attendance: 14,973

=== FA Cup ===
8 January 1983 Third round	Watford	2–0	Plymouth Argyle	Watford
	Rostron 40'; Blissett 72'			Stadium: Vicarage Road; Attendance: 17,630

29 January 1983 Fourth round	Watford	1–1	Fulham	Watford
	Lohman 80'		Coney 55'	Stadium: Vicarage Road; Attendance: 24,574

1 February 1983 Fourth round replay	Fulham	1–2	Watford	London
	Lewington 53'		Lohman 15'; Barnes 85'	Stadium: Craven Cottage; Attendance: 22,206

19 February 1983 Fifth round	Aston Villa	4–1	Watford	Birmingham
	Shaw 32'; Morley 37'; Gibson 57'; Cowans 86'		Blissett 90' (pen.)	Stadium: Villa Park; Attendance: 34,330
