= 1992–93 AFC Bournemouth season =

Bournemouth
1992–93 season
- Manager: Tony Pulis
- Stadium: Dean Court
- Second Division: 17th
- FA Cup: Third Round
- League Cup: First Round
- Football League Trophy: Second Round

During the 1992–93 English football season, AFC Bournemouth competed in the Football League Second Division.

== Final league table ==
| Pos | Team | Pld | W | D | L | GF | GA | GD | Pts |
|---|---|---|---|---|---|---|---|---|---|
| 15 | Huddersfield Town | 46 | 17 | 9 | 20 | 54 | 61 | −7 | 60 |
| 16 | Hartlepool United | 46 | 14 | 12 | 20 | 42 | 60 | −18 | 54 |
| 17 | Bournemouth | 46 | 12 | 17 | 17 | 45 | 52 | −7 | 53 |
| 18 | Blackpool | 46 | 12 | 15 | 19 | 63 | 75 | −12 | 51 |
| 19 | Exeter City | 46 | 11 | 17 | 18 | 54 | 69 | −15 | 50 |

Rules for classification: 1) Points; 2) Goals scored; 3) Goal difference

== Results ==
Bournemouth's score comes first

=== Legend ===
| Win | Draw | Loss |

=== Football League Second Division ===
| Date | Opponent | Venue | Result | Attendance |
|---|---|---|---|---|
| 15 August 1992 | Preston North End | A | 1-1 | 4,756 |
| 22 August 1992 | Port Vale | H | 2-1 | 4,825 |
| 29 August 1992 | West Bromwich Albion | A | 1-2 | 12,563 |
| 1 September 1992 | Mansfield Town | A | 2-0 | 3,031 |
| 5 September 1992 | Hartlepool United | H | 0-2 | 4,446 |
| 12 September 1992 | Fulham | H | 2-1 | 5,398 |
| 15 September 1992 | Blackpool | A | 0-2 | 3,455 |
| 19 September 1992 | Bolton Wanderers | A | 1-1 | 4,623 |
| 26 September 1992 | Huddersfield Town | H | 1-1 | 4,447 |
| 3 October 1992 | Exeter City | A | 1-1 | 3,653 |
| 10 October 1992 | Rotherham United | H | 0-0 | 4,761 |
| 17 October 1992 | Leyton Orient | A | 0-1 | 4,528 |
| 24 October 1992 | Stockport County | H | 1-0 | 4,058 |
| 31 October 1992 | Wigan Athletic | A | 0-0 | 1,803 |
| 3 November 1992 | Brighton & Hove Albion | H | 1-1 | 4,828 |
| 7 November 1992 | Stoke City | A | 0-2 | 15,146 |
| 21 November 1992 | Reading | H | 1-1 | 4,418 |
| 28 November 1992 | Plymouth Argyle | A | 1-2 | 6,408 |
| 12 December 1992 | Bradford City | A | 1-0 | 5,011 |
| 19 December 1992 | Hull City | H | 0-0 | 4,200 |
| 26 December 1992 | Swansea City | H | 0-2 | 4,995 |
| 9 January 1993 | Blackpool | H | 5-1 | 3,807 |
| 16 January 1993 | Huddersfield Town | A | 1-0 | 4,316 |
| 26 January 1993 | West Bromwich Albion | H | 0-1 | 5,687 |
| 30 January 1993 | Port Vale | A | 0-3 | 6,834 |
| 6 February 1993 | Preston North End | H | 2-1 | 3,601 |
| 13 February 1993 | Hartlepool United | A | 1-0 | 2,197 |
| 20 February 1993 | Mansfield Town | H | 4-1 | 3,987 |
| 26 February 1993 | Rotherham United | A | 2-1 | 4,401 |
| 2 March 1993 | Fulham | A | 1-1 | 3,424 |
| 6 March 1993 | Exeter City | H | 1-3 | 4,948 |
| 9 March 1993 | Chester City | A | 0-1 | 1,614 |
| 13 March 1993 | Stoke City | H | 1-1 | 7,129 |
| 16 March 1993 | Burnley | A | 1-1 | 8,601 |
| 20 March 1993 | Brighton & Hove Albion | A | 0-1 | 7,059 |
| 23 March 1993 | Plymouth Argyle | H | 1-3 | 4,150 |
| 27 March 1993 | Reading | A | 2-3 | 5,978 |
| 3 April 1993 | Chester City | H | 0-0 | 2,829 |
| 6 April 1993 | Bradford City | H | 1-1 | 2,851 |
| 10 April 1993 | Swansea City | A | 1-2 | 5,101 |
| 13 April 1993 | Burnley | H | 1-1 | 4,456 |
| 17 April 1993 | Hull City | A | 0-3 | 3,442 |
| 24 April 1993 | Leyton Orient | H | 3-0 | 4,595 |
| 27 April 1993 | Bolton Wanderers | H | 1-2 | 4,434 |
| 1 May 1993 | Stockport County | A | 0-0 | 5,446 |
| 8 May 1993 | Wigan Athletic | H | 0-0 | 3,838 |

=== FA Cup ===
| Round | Date | Opponent | Venue | Result |
|---|---|---|---|---|
| R1 | 14 November 1992 | Barnet | H | 0-0 |
| R1R | 25 November 1992 | Barnet | A | 2-1 |
| R2 | 5 December 1992 | Cheltenham Town | A | 1-1 |
| R2R | 16 December 1992 | Cheltenham Town | A | 3-0 |
| R3 | 2 January 1993 | Blackburn Rovers | A | 1-3 |

=== League Cup ===
| Round | Date | Opponent | Venue | Result | Notes |
|---|---|---|---|---|---|
| R1 1st Leg | 19 August 1992 | Walsall | A | 1-1 | |
| R1 2nd Leg | 25 August 1992 | Walsall | H | 0-1 | Walsall won 2–1 on aggregate |

=== Football League Trophy ===
| Round | Date | Opponent | Venue | Result |
|---|---|---|---|---|
| R1 | 9 December 1992 | Brighton & Hove Albion | A | 2-3 |
| R1 | 5 January 1993 | Reading | H | 1-1 |

== Squad ==
Note: Flags indicate national team as defined under FIFA eligibility rules; some limited exceptions apply. Players may hold more than one non-FIFA nationality.

| Pos. | Nation | Player |
|---|---|---|
| GK | ENG | Neil Moss |
| DF | ENG | Mark Morris |
| DF | ENG | Rob Murray |
| DF | ENG | Keith Rowland |
| DF | ENG | Adrian Pennock |
| DF | ENG | Alex Watson |
| DF | ENG | Denny Mundee |
| DF | ENG | Neil Masters |
| DF | ENG | Paul Morrell |
| MF | IRL | Michael McElhatton |
| MF | NIR | Brian McGorry |
| MF | IRL | Sean O'Driscoll |
| MF | ENG | Paul Mitchell |

| Pos. | Nation | Player |
|---|---|---|
| MF | ENG | Peter Scott |
| MF | ENG | Peter Shearer |
| MF | ENG | David Smith (on loan from Coventry City) |
| MF | WAL | David Williams |
| MF | ENG | Richard Cooke |
| FW | ENG | Steve Fletcher |
| FW | ENG | Paul Wood |
| FW | ENG | Peter Beadle (on loan from Tottenham Hotspur) |
| FW | ENG | Steve Butler (on loan from Watford) |
| FW | NGA | Efan Ekoku |
| FW | WAL | Steve Lovell (on loan from Gillingham) |
| FW | ENG | Nicky Morgan (on loan from Bristol City) |
| FW | ENG | Dave Regis (on loan from Plymouth Argyle) |
