= 1986–87 Tottenham Hotspur F.C. season =

English football club season

Tottenham Hotspur
1986–87 season
- Chairman: Irving Scholar
- Manager: (England) David Pleat
- Stadium: White Hart Lane
- First Division: 3rd
- FA Cup: Runners-up
- League Cup: Semi-finals
- Top goalscorer: League: Clive Allen (33); All: Clive Allen (49)
- Highest home attendance: 41,995 v West Ham United (Littlewoods Cup, 2 February 1987)
- Lowest home attendance: 12,299 v Barnsley (Littlewoods Cup, 8 October 1986)
- Average home league attendance: 25,881
- Biggest win: 5–0 v Birmingham City (H), Littlewoods Cup, 29 October 1986; 5–0 v West Ham United (H), Littlewoods Cup, 2 February 1987; 5–0 v Leicester City (H), Division One, 25 February 1987
- Biggest defeat: 1–3 v Chelsea (H), Division One, 12 September 1986; 1–3 v Luton Town (A), Division One, 28 March 1987
Home colours	Away colours	Third colours

During the 1986–87 English football season, Tottenham Hotspur F.C. competed in the Football League First Division.

== Season summary ==
Tottenham enjoyed a stellar season under David Pleat. Under his management, the club finished third in the First Division, were losing finalists in the FA Cup and reached the semi-finals of the League Cup. Striker Clive Allen arguably played the most important role in Tottenham's success, scoring 33 goals in the league and 49 in all competitions as Tottenham played their best football in years. For his achievements, Allen won both the PFA Players' Player of the Year and FWA Footballer of the Year awards.

== Kit ==
Tottenham's kits were manufactured by Hummel and sponsored by Holsten. The club retained the previous season's home shirts and white shorts, but also introduced matching navy shorts to use when necessary. They also kept the all-blue diagonal-striped away kit, and introduced, for the first time, a third kit, identical to the away kit but rendered in a darker shade of blue.

== Squad ==
Squad at end of season

Note: Flags indicate national team as defined under FIFA eligibility rules; some limited exceptions apply. Players may hold more than one non-FIFA nationality.

Pos.	Nation	Player
GK	ENG	Ray Clemence
GK	ENG	Tony Parks
DF	ENG	Gary Mabbutt
DF	ENG	Paul Miller
DF	ENG	John Polston
DF	ENG	Neil Ruddock
DF	ENG	Gary Stevens
DF	ENG	Mark Stimson
DF	ENG	Danny Thomas
DF	ENG	Mitchell Thomas
DF	WAL	Mark Bowen
DF	SCO	Richard Gough
DF	IRL	Chris Hughton
DF	IRL	Tim O'Shea
MF	ENG	Paul Allen

Pos.	Nation	Player
MF	ENG	Glenn Hoddle
MF	ENG	Steve Hodge
MF	ENG	David Howells
MF	ENG	John Moncur
MF	ENG	Vinny Samways
MF	ENG	Chris Waddle
MF	IRL	Tony Galvin
MF	ARG	Ossie Ardiles
MF	NGR	John Chiedozie
FW	ENG	Clive Allen
FW	ENG	Shaun Close
FW	ENG	Paul Moran
FW	NIR	Phil Gray
FW	BEL	Nico Claesen

=== Left club during season ===
Note: Flags indicate national team as defined under FIFA eligibility rules; some limited exceptions apply. Players may hold more than one non-FIFA nationality.

Pos.	Nation	Player
DF	ENG	Danny Maddix (on loan to Southend United)
DF	ENG	Graham Roberts (to Rangers)

Pos.	Nation	Player
FW	ENG	Mark Falco (to Watford)

== Reserve squad ==
Note: Flags indicate national team as defined under FIFA eligibility rules; some limited exceptions apply. Players may hold more than one non-FIFA nationality.

Pos.	Nation	Player
DF	ENG	Danny Maddix (to Queens Park Rangers)

== Transfers ==
=== Loans out ===
Date from	Position	Nationality	Name	To	Date until	Ref.
October 1986	GK	(England)	Tony Parks	(England) Oxford United	November 1986	

=== Transfers in ===
Date from	Position	Nationality	Name	From	Fee	Ref.
July 1986	DF	(England)	Mitchell Thomas	(England) Luton Town	£275,000	
August 1986	DF	(Scotland)	Richard Gough	(Scotland) Dundee United	£700,000	
October 1986	FW	(Belgium)	Nico Claesen	(Belgium) Standard de Liège	£600,000	
December 1986	MF	(England)	Steve Hodge	(England) Aston Villa	£650,000	

=== Transfers out ===
Date from	Position	Nationality	Name	To	Fee	Ref.
June 1986	MF	(England)	Ian Crook	(England) Norwich City	£80,000	
July 1986	MF	(Scotland)	Ally Dick	(Netherlands) Ajax	Free	
October 1986	FW	(England)	Mark Falco	(England) Watford	£300,000	
December 1986	DF	(England)	Graham Roberts	(Scotland) Rangers	£450,000	
February 1987	DF	(England)	Paul Miller	(England) Charlton Athletic	Undisclosed	

== Results ==
=== First Division ===
Date	Opponent	Venue	Result	Scorers	Attendance
23 August 1986	Aston Villa	A	3–0	C. Allen (3)	24,712
25 August 1986	Newcastle United	H	1–1	C. Allen	25,381
30 August 1986	Manchester City	H	1–0	Roberts	23,764
2 September 1986	Southampton	A	0–2		17,911
6 September 1986	Arsenal	A	0–0		44,707
13 September 1986	Chelsea	H	1–3	C. Allen (pen.)	28,202
20 September 1986	Leicester City	A	2–1	C. Allen (2)	13,141
27 September 1986	Everton	H	2–0	C. Allen (2)	28,007
4 October 1986	Luton Town	H	0–0		22,738
11 October 1986	Liverpool	A	1–0	C. Allen	43,139
18 October 1986	Sheffield Wednesday	H	1–1	C. Allen	26,876
25 October 1986	Queens Park Rangers	A	0–2		21,579
1 November 1986	Wimbledon	H	1–2	M. Thomas	21,820
8 November 1986	Norwich City	A	1–2	Claesen	22,139
15 November 1986	Coventry City	H	1–0	C. Allen	20,255
22 November 1986	Oxford United	A	4–2	C. Allen (2), Waddle (2)	12,143
29 November 1986	Nottingham Forest	H	2–3	C. Allen (2)	30,042
7 December 1986	Manchester United	A	3–3	Mabbutt, Moran (o.g.), C. Allen	35,957
13 December 1986	Watford	H	2–1	Hoddle, Gough	23,137
20 December 1986	Chelsea	A	2–0	C. Allen (2)	21,576
26 December 1986	West Ham United	H	4–0	C. Allen (2), Hodge, Waddle	39,019
27 December 1986	Coventry City	A	3–4	C. Allen (2), Claesen	22,182
1 January 1987	Charlton Athletic	A	2–0	Claesen, Galvin	19,744
4 January 1987	Arsenal	H	1–2	M. Thomas	37,723
24 January 1987	Aston Villa	H	3–0	Hodge (2), Claesen	19,121
14 February 1987	Southampton	H	2–0	Gough, Hodge	22,066
25 February 1987	Leicester City	H	5–0	Claesen (2), C. Allen (2; 1 pen.), P. Allen	16,038
7 March 1987	Queens Park Rangers	H	1–0	C. Allen (pen.)	21,071
22 March 1987	Liverpool	H	1–0	Waddle	32,763
25 March 1987	Newcastle United	A	1–1	Hoddle	30,782
28 March 1987	Luton Town	A	1–3	Waddle	13,447
4 April 1987	Norwich City	H	3–0	C. Allen (3)	22,400
7 April 1987	Sheffield Wednesday	A	1–0	C. Allen	19,488
15 April 1987	Manchester City	A	1–1	Claesen	21,460
18 April 1987	Charlton Athletic	H	1–0	C. Allen	26,926
20 April 1987	West Ham United	A	1–2	C. Allen	23,972
22 April 1987	Wimbledon	A	2–2	Claesen (pen.), Bowen	7,887
25 April 1987	Oxford United	H	3–1	Waddle, P. Allen, Hoddle	20,064
2 May 1987	Nottingham Forest	A	0–2		19,837
4 May 1987	Manchester United	H	4–0	M. Thomas (2), C. Allen (pen.), P. Allen	36,692
9 May 1987	Watford	A	0–1		20,024
11 May 1987	Everton	A	0–1		28,287

==== League table ====
Pos	Team	Pld	W	D	L	GF	GA	GD	Pts	Qualification or relegation
1	Everton (C)	42	26	8	8	76	31	+45	86	Disqualified from the European Cup
2	Liverpool	42	23	8	11	72	42	+30	77	Disqualified from the UEFA Cup
3	Tottenham Hotspur	42	21	8	13	68	43	+25	71	Disqualified from the UEFA Cup
4	Arsenal (Note: Arsenal would have qualified as League Cup winners.)	42	20	10	12	58	35	+23	70	Disqualified from the UEFA Cup
5	Norwich City	42	17	17	8	53	51	+2	68	

Source: World Football
Rules for classification: 1) Points; 2) Goal difference; 3) Goals scored
(C) Champions

=== Littlewoods Cup ===
Round	Date	Opponent	Venue	Result	Goalscorers	Attendance
2(1L)	23 September 1986	Barnsley	A	3–2	Waddle, Roberts, C. Allen	9,979
2(2L)	8 October 1986	Barnsley	H	5–3	Close, Hoddle (2), Galvin, C. Allen	12,299
3	29 October 1986	Birmingham City	H	5–0	Waddle, C. Allen (2), Roberts, Hoddle	15,542
4	26 November 1986	Cambridge United	A	3–1	C. Allen, Close, Waddle	10,033
5	27 January 1987	West Ham United	A	1–1	C. Allen	28,648
5(R)	2 February 1987	West Ham United	H	5–0	Claesen, Hoddle, C. Allen (3; 1 pen.)	41,995
SF(1L)	8 February 1987	Arsenal	A	1–0	C. Allen	41,306
SF(2L)	1 March 1987	Arsenal	H	1–2 (AET - 1–2 at 90 mins.)	C. Allen	37,099
SF(R)	4 March 1987	Arsenal	H	1–2	C. Allen	41,005

=== FA Cup ===
Round	Date	Opponent	Venue	Result	Goalscorers	Attendance
3	10 January 1987	Scunthorpe United	H	3–2	Mabbutt, Claesen, Waddle	19,339
4	31 January 1987	Crystal Palace	H	4–0	Mabbutt, O'Reilly (o.g.), C. Allen (pen.), Claesen	29,603
5	21 February 1987	Newcastle United	H	1–0	C. Allen (pen.)	38,033
6	15 March 1987	Wimbledon	A	2–0	Waddle, Hoddle	15,636
SF	11 April 1987	Watford	N	4–1	Hodge (2), C. Allen, P. Allen	46,161
SF	16 May 1987	Coventry City	N	2–3 (AET - 2–2 at 90 mins.)	C. Allen, Mabbutt	98,000

== Statistics ==
=== Appearances and goals ===
Last updated: 26 July 2020.

Pos.	Name	Premier League		FA Cup		EFL Cup		Total	
Pos.	Name	Apps	Goals	Apps	Goals	Apps	Goals	Apps	Goals
FW	(England) Clive Allen	38+1	33	6	4	8+1	12	52+2	49
MF	(England) Paul Allen	34+3	3	6	1	8+1	0	48+4	4
MF	(Argentina) Ossie Ardiles	15+9	0	4	0	7	0	26+9	0
DF	(Wales) Mark Bowen	1+1	1	0	0	0	0	1+1	1
MF	(Nigeria) John Chiedozie	1	0	0	0	0	0	1	0
FW	(Belgium) Nico Claesen	18+8	8	1+5	2	5	1	24+13	11
GK	(England) Ray Clemence	40	0	6	0	9	0	55	0
FW	(England) Shaun Close	1+1	0	0	0	2	2	3+1	2
FW	(England) Mark Falco	6+1	0	0	0	0+1	0	6+2	0
MF	(Republic of Ireland) Tony Galvin	20+4	1	1	0	2+3	1	23+7	2
DF	(Scotland) Richard Gough	40	2	6	0	9	0	55	2
FW	(Northern Ireland) Phil Gray	1	0	0	0	0	0	1	0
MF	(England) Glenn Hoddle	35+1	3	6	1	8	4	49+1	8
MF	(England) Steve Hodge	19	4	6	2	0	0	25	6
MF	(England) David Howells	1	0	0	0	0	0	1	0
DF	(Republic of Ireland) Chris Hughton	9	0	2	0	0	0	11	0
DF	(England) Gary Mabbutt	37	1	6	3	8	0	51	4
DF	(England) Paul Miller	2	0	0	0	2+1	0	4+1	0
MF	(England) John Moncur	1	0	0	0	0	0	1	0
FW	(England) Paul Moran	1	0	0	0	0	0	1	0
DF	(Republic of Ireland) Tim O'Shea	11	0	0	0	0	0	1+1	0
GK	(England) Tony Parks	2	0	0	0	0	0	2	0
DF	(England) John Polston	6	0	0	0	0+1	0	6+1	0
DF	(England) Graham Roberts	17	1	0	0	4	2	21	3
DF	(England) Neil Ruddock	4	0	0+1	0	0	0	4+1	0
MF	(England) Vinny Samways	1+1	0	0	0	0	0	1+1	0
DF	(England) Gary Stevens	20	0	1+4	0	2+1	0	23+5	0
DF	(England) Mark Stimson	1	0	0	0	0	0	1	0
DF	(England) Danny Thomas	17	0	3	0	8	0	28	0
DF	(England) Mitchell Thomas	35+4	4	6	0	8+1	0	49+5	4
MF	(England) Chris Waddle	39	6	6	2	9	3	54	11

Last updated: 15 May 1999
Source: [[]]

=== Goal scorers ===
Last updated: 26 July 2020.

Rnk	Pos	Player	Premier League	FA Cup	EFL Cup	Total
1	FW	(England) Clive Allen	33	4	12	49
2	MF	(Belgium) Nico Claesen	8	2	1	11
2	MF	(England) Chris Waddle	6	2	3	11
4	MF	(England) Glenn Hoddle	3	1	4	8
5	MF	(England) Steve Hodge	4	2	0	6
6	MF	(England) Paul Allen	3	1	0	4
6	DF	(England) Gary Mabbutt	1	3	0	4
6	DF	(England) Mitchell Thomas	4	0	0	4
9	DF	(England) Graham Roberts	1	0	2	3
10	FW	(England) Shaun Close	0	0	2	2
10	MF	(Republic of Ireland) Tony Galvin	1	0	1	2
10	DF	(Scotland) Richard Gough	2	0	0	2
13	DF	(Wales) Mark Bowen	1	0	0	1
TOTALS			67	15	25	107

=== Clean sheets ===
Last updated: 26 July 2020.

Rnk	Player	Premier League	FA Cup	EFL Cup	Total
1	(England) Ray Clemence	18	3	3	24
2	(England) Tony Parks	1	0	0	1
TOTALS		19	3	3	25
