= Blissett =

Blissett or Blisset is a surname. Notable people with the surname include:

- Gary Blissett (born 1964), former English professional footballer
- Luther Blissett (born 1958), former professional footballer and manager, currently a first-team coach
- Luther Blissett (nom de plume), multiple-use name, an "open reputation" informally adopted and shared by hundreds of artists and social activists all over Europe and South America since 1994
- Joseph Blisset, English MP
