= Les Taylor (footballer) =

English footballer

Personal information
- Full name: Leslie Taylor
- Date of birth: 4 December 1956 (age 69)
- Place of birth: North Shields, England
- Height: 5 ft 8 in (1.73 m)
- Position: Midfielder

Youth career
- Wallsend Boys Club
- Oxford United

Senior career*
Years	Team	Apps	(Gls)
1974–1980	Oxford United	219	(15)
1980–1986	Watford	172	(13)
1986	→ Reading (loan)	?	(?)
1986–1989	Reading	75	(3)
1989–1990	Colchester United	52	(1)
Total		518	(32)
- * Club domestic league appearances and goals

Leslie Taylor (born 4 December 1956) is an English former footballer who captained Watford in the 1984 FA Cup Final. He played as a hard-working central-midfielder. Graham Taylor, his Watford manager, described him as "sniffer and a ratter".

== Career ==
Taylor started his career at Oxford United, signing professional terms in December 1974. He moved to Watford in November 1980 for £100,000 plus Keith Cassells. He was part of the Watford side that achieved promotion to Division One in the 1981–82 season, winning the Player of the Season award that year.

In the 1983–84 season Watford reached the final of the FA Cup. Watford's captain, Wilf Rostron, was sent off in a league fixture against Luton Town preceding the final and incurred a suspension. Therefore, it was Taylor that led Watford out at Wembley. Watford would go on to lose 2–0 to Everton.

Taylor moved on loan to Reading in October 1986 and signed for them permanently in December that year for £20,000. For the same fee he moved to Colchester United in January 1989. He played for the Essex club until retirement in 1990.

Taylor returned to Oxford in 1992. He became United's under-16 coach and is still with the club, now working as Youth Development Officer.

== Honours ==
Watford

- Football League Second Division runner-up: 1981–82
- FA Cup runner-up: 1983–84

Reading

- Full Members' Cup: 1987–88
