= Warren May =

English footballer (born 1964)

Personal information
- Full name: Warren Derek May
- Date of birth: 31 December 1964 (age 61)
- Place of birth: Southend-on-Sea, England
- Position: Defender

Youth career
- Southend United

Senior career*
Years	Team	Apps	(Gls)
1983–1986	Southend United	89	(4)
- Maidstone United
1988–1989	Barking		
- Chelmsford City
- Chesham United
- Harrow Borough
- * Club domestic league appearances and goals

Warren Derek May (born 31 December 1964) is an English former footballer who played as a defender.

== Career ==
May began his career at hometown club Southend United, after playing for the club at youth level. In three years as a professional at the club, May made 99 appearances in all competitions for Southend, scoring four times. In 1986, May signed for Maidstone United. Following a spell at Maidstone, May played for Barking, Chelmsford City, Chesham United and Harrow Borough.
