= Jan Lohman =

Dutch footballer

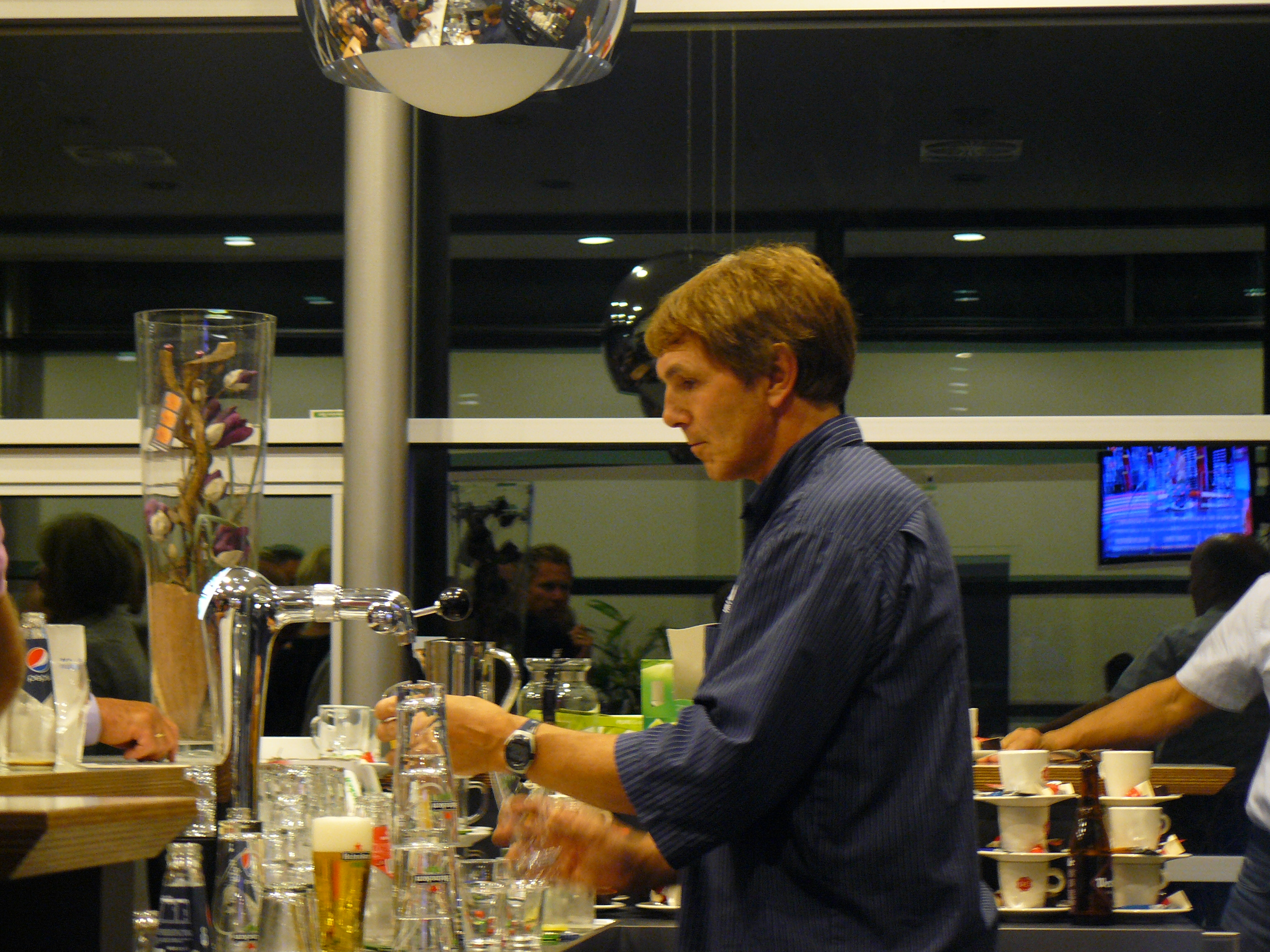

Personal information
- Full name: Johannes Hermanus Petrus Lohman
- Date of birth: 18 February 1959 (age 67)
- Place of birth: Dussen, Netherlands
- Height: 5 ft 10 in (1.78 m)
- Position: Midfielder

Senior career*
| Years | Team | Apps | (Gls) |
| 1977–1978 | FC Vlaardingen '74 | | |
| 1978–1981 | Lokeren | | |
| 1979–1981 | → NEC Nijmegen (loan) | 40 | (6) |
| 1981–1986 | Watford | 63 | (6) |
| 1986–1988 | Beerschot | | |
| 1988–1989 | SVV Schiedam | | |
| 1989–1990 | SC Kapellen-Erft | | |

International career
| 1979–1980 | Netherlands U21 | 8 | (1) |
- * Club domestic league appearances and goals as of 19:22, 25 January 2026 (UTC)

Johannes Hermanus Petrus "Jan" Lohman (born 18 February 1959) is a Dutch former footballer. He played as a central midfielder, and represented his country at under-21 level. Born in Dussen, North Brabant, Lohman played for several Belgian and Dutch clubs, and also spent five seasons in English football with Watford.

== Playing career ==
Lohman started his career at Sporting Lokeren in Belgium, and was subsequently loaned to Dutch sides Vlaardingen and NEC Nijmegen. In September 1981, Lohmann transferred to English Second Division team Watford, for a fee of £35,000, after a trial at the club. In doing so he became the first player to join from outside the Home Nations in the club's 100 year history. Lohman scored in his first Football League game, and Watford were promoted at the end of 1981–82, reaching the First Division for the very first time. Injury restricted Lohman's appearances over the next four years, and by 1986 he had played 81 times for Watford in all competitions, scoring 10 goals.

Lohman was released by Watford at the end of the 1985–86 season, joining Belgian club Germinal Ekeren on a free transfer, before finishing his career with SVV Schiedam and Cappellen FC. He is now retired from football, and works as a barman in Roosendaal in the Netherlands. He suffered a heart attack in November 2010 but survived.
