= Luther Blissett =

English association football player, coach, and manager (born 1958)

Luther Blissett OBE DL
Personal information
- Full name: Luther Loide Blissett
- Date of birth: 1 February 1958 (age 68)
- Place of birth: Falmouth, Jamaica
- Height: 5 ft 10 1/2 in (1.79 m)
- Position: Forward

Youth career
- 1974–1976: Watford

Senior career*
Years	Team	Apps	(Gls)
1975–1983	Watford	246	(95)
1983–1984	Milan	30	(5)
1984–1988	Watford	127	(44)
1988–1991	Bournemouth	121	(56)
1991–1993	Watford	42	(9)
1992	→ West Bromwich Albion (loan)	3	(1)
1993–1994	Bury	10	(1)
1993	→ Derry City (loan)	4	(1)
1993–1994	→ Mansfield Town (loan)	5	(1)
1994	→ Southport (loan)	5	(2)
1994–1995	Wimborne Town		
1995–1996	Fakenham Town		
2007	Chesham United	2	

International career
1979	England U21	4	(0)
1984	England B	1	(0)
1982–1984	England	14	(3)

Managerial career
- 2006–2007: Chesham United
- 2016: Burnham (caretaker)
- * Club domestic league appearances and goals

Luther Loide Blissett OBE DL (born 1 February 1958) is a former professional footballer and manager who played for the England national football team during the 1980s. Born in Jamaica, Blissett played as a forward, and is best known for his time at Watford, whom he helped win promotion from the Fourth Division to the First Division. Blissett set Watford's records for appearances and goals, having played 503 games and scored 186 goals, and was the top goalscorer in the 1982–83 Football League First Division as he led Watford to second-place. He was also one of the first black players to represent England. Blissett was capped 14 times by England, scoring a hat-trick on his debut. After retiring from playing, Blissett turned to coaching, initially under the management of Graham Taylor at Watford, and managed Chesham United from 2006 until 2007.

Blissett's other clubs included Milan, who paid £1 million for him in 1983 before selling him back to Watford for £550,000 in 1984, and Bournemouth, for whom he had a goals-to-games ratio of nearly one goal in every two appearances. After his disappointing season at Milan, he returned to Watford, where he remained until 1988, before moving to Bournemouth for the next three seasons, which were more successful. In 1991, he returned to Watford and the following year moved to West Bromwich Albion, where he played three games. He ended his professional career at the end of the 1993–94 season, playing for Bury in the Third Division, before continuing for a few years in the amateur divisions until his final retirement in 1996.

Although born in Jamaica, Blissett chose to represent England at the international level, earning 14 caps and scoring three goals between 1982 and 1984. Blissett scored all of his goals on 15 December 1982 in a UEFA Euro 1984 qualifying match against Luxembourg, contributing a hat-trick to England's resounding 9–0 victory. After embarking on a coaching career, he was part of the Watford coaching staff from 1996 to 2001; he subsequently served as coach of several smaller English teams, including York City and Chesham United. In 2007, he founded a racing team, Team 48 Motorsport. Since the mid-1990s, "Luther Blissett" has frequently been used as a pseudonym, most notably by members of the Luther Blissett Project.

== Early life ==
Blissett was born in Falmouth, Jamaica, at that time still part of the British Empire as Colony of Jamaica, on 1 February 1958. He was given Luther as first name and Loide as middle name. In 2017, Blissett recalled his first meeting with Graham Taylor, who said his full name three times, before adding: "Well son, with a name like that you are going to have to be a star, aren't you!" Blissett moved to London, aged 5 or 6, and was brought up in the North London area of Willesden. In the summer of 1974, Blissett left Willesden High School to begin his career with Watford as an apprentice.

== Club career ==
=== Watford ===
Blisset began his career at Kingfisher Youth of the Brent Sunday League. He was spotted and later signed by Watford in July 1975. At 17, Blissett turned professional for the 1975–76 season, making three appearances in the Football League Fourth Division and scoring one goal. His debut came on 3 April 1975 as a substitute in a 1–0 win at home to Barnsley. Four goalless appearances came in the 1976–77 season, the second season with Elton John as chairman, before he broke into the first team under new manager Graham Taylor in the 1977–78 season; his six goals in 33 games helped Watford win promotion to the Football League Third Division. 21 goals the following campaign played a big part in a second successive promotion, which took them into the Football League Second Division.

Blissett remained among the club's top goalscorers over the next three seasons as Watford consolidated in the Second Division and finally reached the Football League First Division for the first time in their history in 1982. At the end of the 1978–79 season, he was part of the PFA Team of the Year for the Football League Third Division. In the 1981–82 season, he scored 19 league goals, showcasing his scoring ability. Blissett and his teammates made the headlines during the 1982–83 season as they surprised many by proving successful in the First Division. Watford briefly led the league in the autumn, before finishing second to Liverpool, and qualified for the UEFA Cup. In Watford's first ever First Division season, Blissett was the division's top goalscorer that season with 27 goals, including 4 in a single game (8–0 against Sunderland, establishing a club record), and 33 goals across all competitions that season. Overall, Blissett scored 95 goals in 246 appearances.

=== Milan ===
After the good 1982–83 season, Blissett subsequently moved to Milan. In the summer, he was bought by Milan, an Italian club with a successful domestic and continental tradition; however, after being relegated to Serie B the second time in three years, the club had just been promoted back to Serie A (the top division of the Italian football league system). While the first time it was due to the club's involvement in the 1980 match-fixing scandal (Totonero), this time was on merit. As part of the club's rebuilding efforts, Blissett was bought in June 1983 for £1 million. He was not as successful as he had been in England, scoring five goals in 30 league appearances, as Milan finished in a disappointing sixth place. He was also subjected to racist abuse.

In the 1983–84 season, Blissett scored six goals in 39 appearances, and was best remembered for numerous disappointing performances that did not allow him to gain the sympathy of the Milan tifosi. In particular, the many and often glaring errors in front of goal led the journalist Gianni Brera to irreverently nickname him "Callonissett", in assonance with another former Milanese centre forward Egidio Calloni, who was famous for his missed goals. He was also known as "Luther Miss It" due to his poor scoring streak. As a result, he was considered a bidone, an Italian football term (literally referring to a rubbish bin) used to describe a transfer failure, becoming known as one of the best bidoni.

=== Return to Watford ===
After one season with Milan, Blissett was sold back to Watford for £550,000. In his absence, Watford had reached their first FA Cup final but lost to Everton, while new signing Mo Johnston was top scorer with 20 goals in the First Division. On Blissett's return, Watford failed to achieve their successes of the previous two seasons but survived another four seasons in the First Division. Blissett scored 21 goals in his first season back in the First Division, although they could only manage a mid-table finish. He also helped them reach the FA Cup semi finals in the 1986–87 season but a year later were relegated. With Blissett scoring four times in the league. He remained with the club until November 1988, when he signed for Bournemouth. During his return at Watford, Blissett scored 44 goals in 127 appearances.

=== Bournemouth ===
Blissett was successful at Dean Court, scoring 19 times from 30 league games in the 1988–89 season, as they finished 10th in the Second Division after emerging as surprise promotion contenders in only their second season at that level. He scored 18 goals in the 1989–90 season, although a slump in the second half dragged the Cherries down the table and on the last day they were beaten at home by Leeds United in a result that gave Leeds United the promotion as Second Division champions and relegated Bournemouth to the Third Division. Undeterred, Blissett continued his fine form for Harry Redknapp's team, scoring 19 goals, although it was not enough to earn promotion at the end of the 1990–91 season. In 121 appearances for Bournemouth, he scored 56 goals.

=== Third spell at Watford ===
Blissett returned to Watford for a third spell at the start of the 1991–92 season. They were still in the Second Division, and his 10 goals in the league that season were not enough for Watford to look like promotion contenders, meaning that they would be founder members of the rebranded Division One (rather than the new FA Premier League) for the 1992–93 season. Blissett never played a first-team game for Watford again, his only action in 1992–93 coming in the shape of a three-match loan spell at West Bromwich Albion, which resulted in one Division Two goal. Blissett's third spell at Watford saw 9 goals scored in 42 appearances. Overall, he scored a record of 186 goals in 503 appearances across all competitions (148 goals in 415 appearances in the First Division), setting a club record that he continued to hold in subsequent decades.

=== Lower leagues ===
Blissett ended his English league career in late 1993 with a five-match spell with Division Three club Mansfield Town, where he scored once. This had followed 10 games at Bury and a five-match spell in the Football Conference at Southport, producing two goals, and four games and a goal for Derry City in the League of Ireland, before he finally retired from playing in 1995 after a season playing for Fakenham Town in the Eastern Counties Football League. Blissett ended his career with 213 goals in 513 appearances.

== International and coaching career ==
Although born in Jamaica, Blissett chose to for England, having been eligible to play as he moved to the country at a young age. After making four appearances for England under-21s, Blissett became one of the first black footballers to play for the senior team. Aged 24 years 254 days, he made his debut at Wembley Stadium in a 1–2 friendly loss to West Germany on 13 October 1982. Blissett scored a hat-trick on his full international debut, which was a 9–0 win over Luxembourg, in doing so becoming the first black player ever to score for England. He never scored in any other international despite playing for England a further 13 times. In 1984, he made an appearance for England B. His last match was at 26 years 122 days on 2 June 1984, a friendly at Wembley Stadium between England and the Soviet Union, which ended 0–2. Between October 1983 and October 1984, he was the black English player with most appearances.

Coming in with returning manager Graham Taylor, Blissett rejoined Watford as head coach in February 1996. He left the club in June 2001, following the appointment of Gianluca Vialli as manager. Vialli wanted to appoint his own backroom staff, and Blissett was among those deemed surplus to requirements. Taylor was publicly critical of the decision not to retain long-serving members of staff such as Blissett and Kenny Jackett. In May 2002, Blissett moved to York City to carry out a coaching role. He later left that post and on 15 February 2006 was appointed manager of Southern League team Chesham United, which he even made two appearances for as a substitute. In April 2007, it was announced that Blissett would leave Chesham at the end of the season to concentrate on his involvement with the Windrush Motorsport project, which aimed to enter the 24 Hours of Le Mans. On 27 March 2010, it was confirmed that Blissett had signed to Hemel Hempstead Town as a coach. In the summer of 2016, Blissett was appointed Director of Football at Burnham, briefly serving as caretaker after the departures of both Dave Tuttle and Gifton Noel-Williams.

== Legacy ==
=== Assessment and player style ===
Blissett was known for his powerful running and aerial ability, despite his relatively short stature (for a striker) of 5 ft 10 1/2 in (1.79 m), as reported in 1982. He was also known for his goalscoring ability, which won him the top goalscorer title in the 1982–83 season. As a result of his goalscoring ability, with over 200 goals in over 500 appearances of a 19-year career, as well as for his ability to take lowly teams to the top (most notably Watford, from the Fourth Division to the First Division), Blissett is widely considered among the best Jamaican and Watford footballers and of English football. For black English players, he was a trailblazer, as he was among the first, more specifically the fifth, the second forward after Cyrille Regis, and the 960th overall, to represent England at a senior level, and was the first black player to score a hat-trick. In 2003, he was inducted into Watford's hall of fame.

Although best known for his successful stints at Watford, Blissett is well known (especially in Italy) for his stint at Milan, albeit disappointing. In an 1983 interview with La Gazzetta dello Sport, he famously said: "I'm an atypical Jamaican. I don't drink, I don't take drugs, and I don't go out with women." Of Blissett, Ilario Castagner (his head coach at Milan) said in November 2016 that he had arrived at Milan from Watford "with the Golden Boot award award, Europe's top scorer", and that his problem was that he had not settled in, as he had not learned Italian, and he looked at the Milanello pitch "with the sadness of a caged bird", concluding that communication is an important aspect in football.

In a 2011 interview with Sky Sport Italia, Blissett said that playing for Milan was "a dream" and that it was "the best club". He added that he did not score much because his teammates gave him "so few balls" and their style was "too defensive". He also recalled that the Watford chairman wanted to give him "a blank check, but Milan was a dream, Italy were world champions, and the league was one of the most important." In January 2016, he said: "In Serie A, I learned what it meant to man-mark, and this only enhanced my technical knowledge as a player. It made me a better player and showed me what football was like outside of England. I think all English players who want to test themselves abroad should do so without hesitation. You should never underestimate what you could gain from a new experience."

It was long rumoured that Milan confused him with his Watford teammate John Barnes. Italian football journalist Gabriele Marcotti argued that this story was untrue, stating: "There are two main reason for which I think it's not true. First, even the most ignorant and provincial person could see that Blissett and Barnes looked absolutely nothing alike. Second, the fact is that at that time Milan were looking for an out-and-out goalscorer and Barnes just wasn't that type of player." Blissett famously complained about Italy: "No matter how much money you have here, you can't seem to get Rice Krispies." He later stated this was a joking response to what he considered a stupid question from a journalist. In later years, he expressed regrets, wishing that the highly successful future Milan head coach Arrigo Sacchi was there during his time at Milan. He observed that the Italian game "still revolved entirely around" the concepts of catenaccio and ball possession, and praised Sacchi for having "revolutionised all of this", just as had been done with Dutch Total Football in his time, and that attack became the best form of defence in football.

=== Cultural impact and anti-racism ===
After the end of his playing career, Blissett worked as a television pundit for Channel 4 and Bravo's coverage of Italian football's top division Serie A. As an outspoken anti-racist who faced derogatory chants throughout his career, wanting to get rid of racism in association football, he and fellow former Watford and England footballers John Barnes and Les Ferdinand founded Team 48 Motorsport, a team aiming to promote young racing drivers of Afro-Caribbean background. Soccer AM, a football magazine programme on Sky Sports, refers to the area where "fans of the week" sit as the "Luther Blissett Stand". He was one of the fifty ambassadors to promote the England 2018 FIFA World Cup bid.

In December 2019, Blissett strongly condemned racism in Italian football. While his comments came after the Corriere dello Sport put "Black Friday" in the headline, he spoke of a "cultural problem" in Italy, citing other racist incidents, said that black players were "still regarded as inferior by many Italian fans", and called for punishments as in 2006 to make an example. Earlier in October 2019, he had called for matches to be stopped if racist incidents were to occur. Blissett was appointed Officer of the Order of the British Empire (OBE) in the 2022 Birthday Honours for his services to association football and charity.

=== Blissett and the Luther Blissett Project ===
Starting in the 1990s, Blissett's name began to be adopted by many people in anarchist and radical politics activist circles as a nom de plume or collective alias when engaged in unusual performances, situationist pranks, media hoaxes, and the production of radical left-wing theory. The "Luther Blissett" multiple name project first began in 1994 in Bologna, Italy, where the real Blissett became one of the first English footballers to join its top division. Of the collective, he said: "When I played for Milan I was one of the few black players in the league, so I think they must have chosen me for that reason." His name is widely used by artists, underground reviews, poets, performers, and squatters' collectives in many cities and countries, especially in Europe. In 1999, "Luther Blissett" authored a historical novel called Q, which sold hundreds of thousands of copies in over ten languages. On 30 June 2004, the real Blissett took part in the British television sports show Fantasy Football League – Euro 2004, broadcast on ITV. He jokingly claimed that he was part of the Luther Blissett Project, and read aloud a sentence from a Luther Blissett Project manifesto in Italian: "Anyone can be Luther Blissett simply by adopting the name Luther Blissett" (Chiunque può essere Luther Blissett, semplicemente adottando il nome Luther Blissett).

A "Luther Blissett" collective was the author of the 2007 book Il processo illecito. Tutte le verità nascoste dell'estate del calcio: intercettazioni abusive, sabbie, fumi, abusi di potere e procure creative (The Illegal Trial: All the Hidden Truths of Football's Summer. Abusive Wiretaps, Sand, Smoke, Abuses of Power, and Creative Prosecutors), a critical analysis of the 2006 Italian football scandal (Calciopoli), which involved among others Blissett's former club Milan but was especially focused by both the investigators and the media on Juventus. Alongside the website Ju29ro.com, a group of lawyers, accountants, and communication experts who collected and verified court rulings, despite the significant disadvantage in terms of visibility, this "Luther Blissett" collective was able to successfully create a counter-information that ultimately debunked most of the allegations by the prosecution and the media (match fixing, rigged leagues and drawing lots, Juventus exclusive or preferential relations with the referee designators, gifts, corrupted referees, journalists, and judges, a referee forcibly closed in the locker room, GEA World as a criminal conspiracy aimed at illegal competition with use of threats and violence, and comparisons to the Italian Mafia, the Sicilian Mafia Commission, and Propaganda Due) made at the dawn of the scandal and that had created a trial by media, overturning the presumption of innocence and the right to a fair trial, free from sensationalism.

== Personal life and motorsport ==
In December 1986, Blissett married Veronica M. H. Maginley. He is the uncle of Nathan Blissett (born 1990), also a footballer who played as a forward. During his youth, Blissett used to help his father do car repairs and became a fan of motorsport, especially Formula One, the British Touring Car Championship, and sports car racing. Eventually, he was able to drive race cars. In 2008, Blissett entered a team into the British Touring Car Championship, aiming to run Alfa Romeos for white Jamaican Matthew Gore and 18-year-old black Briton Darelle Wilson. The project never got off the starting line and the team failed to show up for any of the races. Blissett told Autosport: "It's important that all of our drivers are properly prepared and have sufficient time in the car prior to a race. Without this, we would be doing ourselves an injustice, which is why we took the decision to opt out on this occasion."

In 2011, Blissett took part in a celebrity motor race at the 2011 Silverstone Classic. He had a large crash on the opening lap, rolling the car several times but was unhurt. Rick Parfitt Jr. won the race, with Heston Blumenthal second and Brendan Cole third. They were all raising money for the Bobby Moore Fund for Cancer Research UK. From 2014, Blissett was racing his own Alfa Romeo 156, taking part at the British Racing and Sports Car Club Alfashop Alfa Romeo Championship.

== Career statistics ==
Appearances and goals by club, season, and competition
Club	Season	League			National cup (Note: Includes FA Cup, Coppa Italia)		League cup (Note: Includes Football League Cup)		Total	
Club	Season	Division	Apps	Goals	Apps	Goals	Apps	Goals	Apps	Goals
Watford	1975–76	Fourth Division	3	1						
Watford	1976–77	Fourth Division	4	0						
Watford	1977–78	Fourth Division	33	6						
Watford	1978–79	Third Division	41	21						
Watford	1979–80	Second Division	42	10						
Watford	1980–81	Second Division	42	11						
Watford	1981–82	Second Division	40	19						
Watford	1982–83	First Division	41	27						33
Watford	Total		246	95						101
Milan	1983–84	Serie A	30	5	9	1	–		39	6
Watford	1984–85	First Division	41	21						
Watford	1985–86	First Division	23	7						
Watford	1986–87	First Division	35	11						
Watford	1987–88	First Division	25	4						
Watford	1988–89	Second Division	3	1						
Watford	Total		127	44						
Bournemouth	1988–89	Second Division	30	19						
Bournemouth	1989–90	Second Division	46	18						
Bournemouth	1990–91	Third Division	45	19						
Bournemouth	Total		121	56						
Watford	1991–92	Second Division	42	10						
West Bromwich Albion	1992–93	Second Division	3	1						
Bury	1993–94	Third Division	10	1						
Mansfield Town	1993–94	Third Division	5	1						
Career total			584	213						

== Honours ==
=== Awards ===
Blissett was awarded the Freedom of the Borough of Watford on 10 March 2021. On 18 June 2021, he was appointed as a Deputy Lieutenant of Hertfordshire. In June 2022, he was awarded an OBE as part of the 2022 Birthday Honours.

=== Club, international, and individual honours ===
England

- British Home Championship, 1982–83, 1983–84

Watford

- 1977–78 Football League Fourth Division
- 1978–79 Football League Third Division runners-up, PFA Team of the Year
- 1981–82 Football League Second Division runners-up
- 1982–83 Football League First Division runners-up, top goalscorer
- Watford Hall of Fame, 2003

Sources

- "Luther Blissett". England Football Online. 2011. Citing Lammings, Douglas (1990). An English Football Internationalist Who's Who. Hutton Press. ISBN 0-9070339-3-8.

== See also ==
- List of England international footballers born outside England
