= Neil Masters =

Northern Irish footballer and coach

Personal information
- Full name: Neil Bradley Masters
- Date of birth: 25 May 1972 (age 54)
- Place of birth: Ballymena, Northern Ireland
- Height: 1.85 m (6 ft 1 in)
- Position: Left-back

Team information
- Current team: Rygge FK (manager)

Youth career
- Lisburn Youth

Senior career*
Years	Team	Apps	(Gls)
1990–1993	Bournemouth	50	(6)
1991	Moss (loan)	8	(0)
1993–1997	Wolverhampton	18	(1)
1997–2000	Gillingham	11	(0)
2001	Moss	0	(0)
Total		90	(8)

Managerial career
- 2004–2005: Rygge FK
- * Club domestic league appearances and goals

Neil Masters (born 25 May 1972) is a Northern Irish football coach and former player.

== Career ==
Masters was born in Ballymena, Northern Ireland. In his early career he played for Lisburn Youth in Drumbo. A left-back during his active career, played English league football for Bournemouth, Wolverhampton and Gillingham.

In August 1995, he was called up to the Northern Ireland national team's squad UEFA Euro 1996 qualifying match against Portugal but had to withdraw due to knee problems.

He joined Norwegian club Moss FK ahead of the 2001 season.

Having retired as a player after the 2003 season, he was hired as coach of Rygge FK, a fourth-tier Norwegian club located near Moss.
