= Brian McGorry =

English footballer (born 1970)

Personal information
- Full name: Brian Paul McGorry
- Date of birth: 16 April 1970 (age 56)
- Place of birth: Liverpool, England
- Height: 5 ft 11 in (1.80 m)
- Position: Midfielder

Senior career*
| Years | Team | Apps | (Gls) |
| 1990–1991 | Weymouth | ? | (?) |
| 1991–1994 | AFC Bournemouth | 61 | (11) |
| 1994–1995 | Peterborough United | 52 | (6) |
| 1995–1997 | Wycombe Wanderers | 4 | (0) |
| 1996 | → Cardiff City (loan) | 7 | (0) |
| 1997–1998 | Hereford United | 40 | (1) |
| 1998–1999 | Torquay United | 34 | (1) |
| 1999–2001 | Telford United | 66 | (1) |
| 2001–2002 | Southport | 12 | (0) |
| 2002 | → Woking (loan) | 2 | (0) |
| 2002 | Chester City | 14 | (0) |
| 2002–2003 | Tamworth | ? | (?) |
| 2003–2005 | Nuneaton Borough | ? | (?) |
- * Club domestic league appearances and goals as of 18:10, 18 August 2007 (UTC)

Brian Paul McGorry (born 16 April 1970) is an English former professional footballer who played most of his career as a midfielder.

McGorry began his career as an apprentice with Liverpool, but on failing to make the grade joined Weymouth, who he left to join AFC Bournemouth for a fee of £30,000 in August 1991. He played 61 times for the Cherries and won 3 player of the season awards before a £60,000 move to league 2 (pre championship) Peterborough United in February 1994. Although a regular in the Posh side, he left to join Wycombe Wanderers on a free transfer in August 1995, but a serious hamstring injury meant he made only four appearances (all as substitute) in nearly two seasons.

During this time McGorry studied to gain his Degree in Sports Science.

He joined Cardiff City on loan in March 1996, and left Wycombe to join Hereford United on transfer deadline day in March 1997 to strengthen a weak midfield. Despite impressing, and scoring a free kick (securing 3 precious points against Colchester) Hereford were relegated at the end of the season. He remained at Edgar Street during their first season in the Conference and named captain before moving to Torquay United on a free transfer back into the football league in July 1998. He played 34 times the following season and joined Telford United in August 1999. He settled in well at Telford, and was made club captain of a side including another former Torquay player Simon Travis. He remained part-time to study and gain his master's degree when Telford went professional, his commitments, teaching and running a business, ruling out a return to full-time football. On 17 July 2001 he left Telford on a free transfer to join Southport.

He had a spell on loan with Woking and in January 2002 joined his former Southport manager Mark Wright at Chester City. In May 2002 McGorry was transfer-listed by Chester and was released by mutual consent in July 2002. He joined Tamworth that August. In July 2003 he moved to Nuneaton Borough as player-coach. He was transfer-listed in October 2004 and was released in May 2005.

In January 2006 he became temporary first team coach at Vauxhall Motors.

Since retiring from professional football, McGorry started his own business in his native Liverpool. He is the founder and owner of a company that specialises in Sport Science and personal training courses.

Following major success teaching and running courses at St. Margaret's High School, Liverpool and professional footballers, McGorry teamed up with Robbie Fowler to form the Robbie Fowler Education and Football Academy.

In 2018 they were the English College and Dubai International Super Cup champions. In 2019 they were awarded the BTEC Global and North West most inspirational College of the year recognising their outstanding quality.
