= Shaun Close =

English footballer (born 1966)

Personal information
- Full name: Shaun Charles Close
- Date of birth: 8 September 1966 (age 60)
- Place of birth: Islington, England
- Height: 5 ft 8 in (1.73 m)
- Position: Centre forward

Youth career
- 1982–1986: Tottenham Hotspur

Senior career*
Years	Team	Apps	(Gls)
1986–1988	Tottenham Hotspur	12	(2)
1988	Halmstad	13	(3)
1988–1989	AFC Bournemouth	39	(8)
1989–1993	Swindon Town	44	(2)
1993–1994	Barnet	27	(10)
1994–?	Bishop's Stortford	6	(2)
- * Club domestic league appearances and goals

Shaun Charles Close (born 8 September 1966) is an English former association football centre forward. He started his career as a youth player for Tottenham Hotspur, Made his debut in the first team 1986 12 appearances scoring 2 goals. Had a serious MCL injury which kept him out of the game for 18 months. Had a spell with Halmstad in Sweden after fracturing his leg in a youth match against West Ham. Was sold to AFC Bournemouth in 1988 and then In 1989, he was signed by Swindon Town manager Osvaldo Ardiles, In 1993, he spent a season with Barnet, before moving down to non-league with Bishop's Stortford. Owned a pub in Hertfordshire, before starting his career in the leisure industry becoming a swimming teacher and personal trainer. Moved to Australia with his Australian wife, has become an Australian citizen and is still living there.

== References / external links ==
- Swindon-Town-FC.co.uk - Shaun Close
- Barnet Fan Club of Norway

Citations
