= Paul Wood (footballer) =

English footballer

Personal information
- Date of birth: 1 November 1964 (age 62)
- Place of birth: Saltburn-by-the-Sea, England
- Height: 5 ft 9 in (1.75 m)
- Position: Right winger

Youth career
- Portsmouth

Senior career*
Years	Team	Apps	(Gls)
1982–1987	Portsmouth	47	(7)
1987–1990	Brighton & Hove Albion	92	(8)
1990–1991	Sheffield United	28	(3)
1991	→ AFC Bournemouth (loan)	21	(0)
1991–1994	AFC Bournemouth	78	(18)
1994–1997	Portsmouth	32	(3)
1997	Andover	4	(2)
1997–1998	Happy Valley AA	20	(15)
1998–2003	Havant & Waterlooville	137	(48)
- * Club domestic league appearances and goals

Paul Wood (born 1 November 1964) is an English former footballer who played as a right-sided attacking midfielder in the Football League for Portsmouth, Brighton & Hove Albion, Sheffield United and AFC Bournemouth. He played in Hong Kong for Happy Valley and on his return joined Havant & Waterlooville in September 1998, was the club's Player Of The Year in 2001, and retired at the end of the 2002–03 season.

At the end of Portsmouth's home fixture against West Bromwich Albion on 25 October 1986, Wood and teammate Micky Quinn were both ejected from the ground by police officers after being overheard swearing at a linesman during the second half of the game. Chief Inspector David Hanna of Hampshire Constabulary said they would have been ejected at half-time if the incident had happened in the first half.
