= Matty Holmes =

English footballer (born 1969)

Personal information
- Full name: Matthew Jason Holmes
- Date of birth: 1 August 1969 (age 57)
- Place of birth: Luton, England
- Position: Midfielder

Youth career
- 1986–1987: AFC Bournemouth

Senior career*
Years	Team	Apps	(Gls)
1988–1992	AFC Bournemouth	114	(8)
1989	→ Cardiff City (loan)	1	(0)
1992–1995	West Ham United	76	(4)
1995–1997	Blackburn Rovers	9	(1)
1997–2000	Charlton Athletic	16	(1)
2000–2004	Dorchester Town	170	(19)
Total		386	(33)
- * Club domestic league appearances and goals

Matthew Jason Holmes (born 1 August 1969) is an English former professional footballer who played as a midfielder.

He notably played in the Premier League for West Ham United, Blackburn Rovers and Charlton Athletic. He also played in the Football League for AFC Bournemouth and Cardiff City. In 2000 he went into semi-retirement at the age of 30 due to an injury inflicted by Australian defender Kevin Muscat during an FA Cup game in 1998. He later played at non-league level for Dorchester Town.

== Club career ==
Holmes joined AFC Bournemouth in 1986 where he remained until 1992 when he joined West Ham United. The fee was an initial £40,000 rising to £60,000 on appearances. Making his debut on 19 August 1992 in a 2–0 away defeat to Newcastle United, Holmes was part of the West Ham team which won promotion to the Premier League in the 1992–93 season. Two seasons in the Premier League followed with West Ham before he joined Blackburn Rovers in August 1995 for a fee of £1.2m. Holmes played only nine games for Blackburn before being signed by manager Alan Curbishley for Charlton Athletic in July 1997.

His professional career was ended on 3 February 1998, whilst playing in an FA Cup fourth round replay against Wolverhampton Wanderers. Holmes was fouled by Wolves player Kevin Muscat causing an injury so severe his surgeon told him that he had been fortunate not to have his leg amputated. He underwent a series of operations to repair his injured leg but was unable to return to top-level football. He played only 20 minutes first team football as a substitute in one Cup game in the remaining two and a half years of his contract. In July 2000, Holmes left top-flight professional football and moved to Dorchester Town.

== Coaching career ==
He now runs a coaching school in the Dorset and Hampshire areas, which is aimed at children between the ages of five and twelve, and works for Bournemouth running centre of excellence age groups 6 - 11 and local development centres.

== Personal life ==
He is the nephew of former Middlesbrough, Bolton Wanderers and Arsenal manager Bruce Rioch.

In 2004, Holmes was awarded £250,000 by the English High court for damages resulting from the tackle by Kevin Muscat.
