= Mark Newson =

English footballer and coach

Personal information
- Full name: Mark Joseph Newson
- Date of birth: 7 December 1960 (age 65)
- Place of birth: Stepney, England
- Height: 5 ft 10 in (1.78 m)
- Position: Defender

Youth career
- 1975–1978: Charlton Athletic

Senior career*
Years	Team	Apps	(Gls)
1978–1979	Charlton Athletic	0	(0)
1979–1985	Maidstone United	226	(45)
1985–1989	Bournemouth	177	(23)
1989–1993	Fulham	102	(4)
1993–1995	Barnet	59	(3)
1995	→ Tottenham Hotspur (loan)	0	(0)
1995–1996	Aylesbury United	32	(3)
1995	Östers IF	4	(1)
1996–1997	Aylesbury United	14	(0)
1997–1998	Gravesend & Northfleet	18	(1)
1998	Aylesbury United	4	(0)
1998–1999	Gravesend & Northfleet	10	(0)
1999–2001	Fisher Athletic		
2001	Romford	7	(0)
Total		653	(84)

International career
1983–1984	England C	5	(0)
- * Club domestic league appearances and goals

Mark Joseph Newson (born 7 December 1960) is an English former footballer. He has since moved into coaching.

Newson's career began as an apprentice at Charlton Athletic, although he made no first-team appearances for the club and was released in 1979. He signed for Maidstone United ahead of the 1979–80 season, and spent six seasons with the club, enjoying success when Maidstone won the 1983–84 Alliance Premier League. He joined Bournemouth in 1985, and captained the side to the Third Division title during the 1986–87 season. Newson later signed for Fulham in 1989, captaining the club for four years. He was captain at Barnet for two years, before joining Tottenham Hotspur on loan in order to play in the club's 1995 UEFA Intertoto Cup games. He spent a brief spell at Swedish club Östers, before playing out the remainder of his career at four different non-league clubs.

After gaining a number of coaching qualifications, Newson began coaching as a youth team coach at West Ham United. He later became assistant manager at VCD Athletic in 2009, before moving to Chatham Town a year later. He was appointed as a youth team coach at Championship club Crystal Palace in 2011. He then spent a-year-and-two-months as assistant manager at League One side Stevenage.

== Club career ==
Newson began his career at Charlton Athletic, and progressed through the club's youth system. However, he was unable to break into the first-team, and was subsequently released by the club at the end of the 1978–79 campaign. Newson joined Maidstone United in 1979, remaining at the club for over six years. During his time at Maidstone, Newson helped the club win the 1983–84 Alliance Premier League. After impressing the following season under manager Barry Fry, being described as "one of the best midfielders outside of the Football League", Newson attracted the interest of new Bournemouth manager Harry Redknapp, who wished to make Newson one of his first signings ahead of the 1985–86 season. He signed for Bournemouth in the summer of 1985, with an administrative error in Newson's contract meaning he was able to join Bournemouth on a free transfer. Fry had initially told Bournemouth he wanted £70,000 for Newson, but Redknapp had been aware of the fact that Newson was not on a contract at Maidstone, and could consequently be signed on a free transfer. It proved to be a fruitful move for both parties as Newson stayed with the club for four years. He was made captain during the 1986–87 campaign, his second season with the club, and guided Bournemouth to the Third Division title, winning the league by a margin of three points, ahead of second-place Middlesbrough. Newson went on to make almost 200 appearances for the club during his four-year tenure, scoring 23 goals.

Newson signed for Fulham towards the latter stages of 1989, who were playing in the Third Division, for a fee of £100,000. On signing for the club, Newson was made captain, and went on to make over 100 appearances for the west-London club over four seasons. He made 16 appearances for the club during the 1989–90 season, as Fulham managed to avoid relegation on the last day of the season. Newson played 31 times the following season, scoring once, with Fulham again narrowly escaping the drop after earning four points in their last two games. He scored three goals in 26 appearances during Fulham's 1991–92 campaign, as the club improved dramatically to finish in ninth place, only four points behind Peterborough United who were occupying the final play-off spot. Newson made 29 league appearances for Fulham in his final season with the club, with injuries disrupting his season.

Ahead of the 1993–94 season, Newson signed for Barnet of Division Two, captaining the side for two seasons and making 59 appearances in all competitions, scoring four goals. In June 1995, at the age of 35, Newson signed for Premier League side Tottenham Hotspur on a short-term loan deal. Newson joined Tottenham on loan in order to play in the club's 1995 UEFA Intertoto Cup campaign. Tottenham wished to field a weakened side for their four Intertoto Cup games, with Tottenham's home games being played at Brighton & Hove Albion's Goldstone Ground, and subsequently signed several loan players from local clubs mixed with a number of youth players. He made his first appearance for Tottenham in a 2–0 defeat to Swiss club Luzern, playing the whole match. Newson played in the club's next group match, a 2–1 away win against Rudar Velenje on 1 July 1995, in what turned out to be Tottenham's only victory of the tournament. He played in a 2–1 defeat to Östers, followed by the club's biggest ever defeat, an 8–0 loss away to Bundesliga side FC Köln on 22 July. His loan ended after the final group match, and he subsequently returned to Barnet in July 1995.

He joined Aylesbury United ahead of the 1995–96 season. Newson made his debut for the club in a 1–0 defeat to Dulwich Hamlet, playing alongside fellow debutant Gary Smith, on the opening day of the season. During the season, Newson made 32 appearances for the club, scoring three goals – his first goal coming in a 2–2 away draw against Boreham Wood on 16 March 1996. He remained at Aylesbury for another season, although briefly played for Swedish club Östers, before returning to Aylesbury United in November 1996. He then joined Gravesend & Northfleet, only to return to Aylesbury for a third time and make four appearances at the end of the 1997–98 season. Newson rejoined Gravesend in 1998, before spending two years with Fisher Athletic. Newson would end his playing career with Romford, signing for the club in 2001. He made his debut for Romford against East Thurrock United on 8 September 2001, becoming the oldest ever Romford player at the age of 40. He made eight appearances for the club in all competitions, playing his final game against Marlow on 27 October 2001.

== International career ==
During the 1983–84 season, Newson was called up to play for the England C team, who represent England at non-league level, winning five caps for his country.

== Coaching career ==
Following his retirement from the professional game, Newson qualified as a UEFA 'A' licence football coach in 1999. He also worked as an FA Licensed Tutor, and worked for the Surrey FA for a number of years, concentrating solely on improving coaches, creating a course described as "one of the best-regarded coaching programmes in the country". Newson later worked for the Kent FA. He is one of only a handful of UEFA coach assessors that exist in the country.

His early coaching career included spending time with West Ham United, where he helped to develop academy players such as Junior Stanislas and Zavon Hines. Newson was also one of the senior coaches involved with the David Beckham Academy. In November 2009, Newson was appointed assistant manager at VCD Athletic. On appointing Newson as his assistant, VCD Athletic manager Paul Foley stated – "He has always been a winner, a character and a real football person with the presence that comes with people who have actually been there and done it, so he brings all of those personal qualities along too". Newson followed Foley to Chatham Town in the summer of 2010, again as assistant manager. He later worked as a youth team coach at Crystal Palace in 2011.

In January 2012, Newson joined League One side Stevenage as part of Gary Smith's backroom staff, taking on the role of assistant manager. He left Stevenage when Smith was sacked in March 2013.

He is now first-team coach at National League club Dover Athletic.

== Honours ==
Maidstone United

- Alliance Premier League: 1983–84

Bournemouth

- Football League Third Division: 1986–87
