= Mark O'Connor (English footballer) =

English footballer

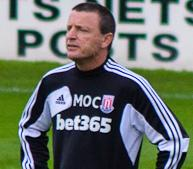

Personal information
- Full name: Mark Andrew O'Connor
- Date of birth: 10 March 1963 (age 63)
- Place of birth: Rochford, England
- Height: 5 ft 7 in (1.70 m)
- Position: Midfielder

Team information
- Current team: West Bromwich Albion (coach)

Senior career*
Years	Team	Apps	(Gls)
1981–1983	Queens Park Rangers	3	(0)
1983–1984	→ Exeter City (loan)	38	(1)
1984–1985	Bristol Rovers	80	(10)
1985–1990	AFC Bournemouth	128	(12)
1990–1993	Gillingham	116	(8)
1993–1995	AFC Bournemouth	58	(3)
1995–1998	Gillingham	40	(1)
Total		463	(35)

International career
1985	Republic of Ireland-U21	1	(0)
- * Club domestic league appearances and goals

Mark Andrew O'Connor (born 10 March 1963) is an English former footballer who played as a midfielder in the Football League for Queens Park Rangers, Exeter City, Bristol Rovers, AFC Bournemouth and Gillingham.

== Playing career ==
O'Connor was born in Rochford and began his career with Queens Park Rangers. He made only three appearances for Rangers in three seasons, and the 1983–84 campaign he spent out on loan at Exeter City. He joined Bristol Rovers in the summer of 1984. O'Connor earned one cap for the Republic of Ireland U21 side against England in 1985. He spent one and half years at Eastville Stadium making 99 appearances scoring 13 goals before leaving for AFC Bournemouth in March 1986. O'Connor spent five seasons at Dean Court making 148 appearances and helped the Cherries win the Third Division title in 1986–87. He then went on to play for Gillingham and then made a return to Bournemouth before ending his career back at Gillingham helping the side gain promotion in 1995–96. He broke his leg against Fulham on 25 November 1995 in a tackle with Martin Thomas which resulted in his retirement from playing just over a year later.

== Coaching career ==
After ending his playing career in 1998 he moved into coaching with manager Tony Pulis at Gillingham whom he played with at Bournemouth. He moved with Pulis to Portsmouth in June 2000 and became their academy manager where he remained until 2005 when he linked up again with Pulis at Plymouth Argyle. He spent a season at Plymouth before moving back to Stoke City with Pulis to become one of his first-team coaches alongside former teammate Adrian Pennock in June 2006. He left Stoke at the end of the 2012–13 season. On 22 July 2013 O'Connor joined Bristol City as their under-21 manager.

In January 2015 O'Connor joined West Bromwich Albion to work again with Pulis and Kemp.

== Career statistics ==
Appearances and goals by club, season and competition
Club	Season	League			FA Cup		League Cup		Other^{[A]}		Total	
Club	Season	Division	Apps	Goals	Apps	Goals	Apps	Goals	Apps	Goals	Apps	Goals
Queens Park Rangers	1981–82	Second Division	1	0	0	0	0	0	0	0	1	0
Queens Park Rangers	1982–83	Second Division	2	0	0	0	0	0	0	0	2	0
Queens Park Rangers	1983–84	First Division	0	0	0	0	0	0	0	0	0	0
Queens Park Rangers	Total		3	0	0	0	0	0	0	0	3	0
Exeter City (loan)	1983–84	Third Division	38	1	2	1	0	0	3	1	43	2
Exeter City (loan)	Total		38	1	2	1	0	0	3	1	43	2
Bristol Rovers	1984–85	Third Division	46	8	3	1	4	0	2	0	55	9
Bristol Rovers	1985–86	Third Division	34	2	4	0	4	1	2	1	44	4
Bristol Rovers	Total		80	10	7	1	8	1	4	1	99	13
AFC Bournemouth	1985–86	Third Division	9	1	0	0	0	0	0	0	9	1
AFC Bournemouth	1986–87	Third Division	43	7	2	0	0	0	3	0	48	7
AFC Bournemouth	1987–88	Second Division	37	2	1	0	5	0	0	0	43	2
AFC Bournemouth	1988–89	Second Division	33	2	4	0	1	0	1	0	39	2
AFC Bournemouth	1989–90	Second Division	6	0	0	0	2	0	1	0	9	0
AFC Bournemouth	Total		128	12	7	0	8	0	5	0	148	12
Gillingham	1989–90	Fourth Division	15	1	0	0	0	0	1	0	16	1
Gillingham	1990–91	Fourth Division	41	3	1	0	2	0	2	0	46	3
Gillingham	1991–92	Fourth Division	39	3	2	0	2	0	2	0	45	3
Gillingham	1992–93	Third Division	21	1	5	0	4	0	2	1	32	2
Gillingham	Total		116	8	8	0	8	0	7	1	139	9
AFC Bournemouth	1993–94	Second Division	45	3	4	0	4	0	1	0	54	3
AFC Bournemouth	1994–95	Second Division	13	0	0	0	4	0	0	0	17	0
AFC Bournemouth	Total		58	3	4	0	8	0	1	0	71	3
Gillingham	1995–96	Third Division	18	1	2	0	2	0	0	0	22	1
Gillingham	1996–97	Second Division	22	0	3	0	1	0	0	0	26	0
Gillingham	1997–98	Second Division	0	0	0	0	1	0	0	0	1	0
Gillingham	Total		40	1	5	0	4	0	0	0	49	1
Career total			463	35	33	2	36	1	20	3	552	41

A. The "Other" column constitutes appearances and goals in the Football League Trophy and Full Members Cup.

== Honours ==
Bournemouth

- Football League Third Division: 1986–87
