= David Coleman (footballer, born 1967) =

English footballer

Personal information
- Full name: David Houston Coleman
- Date of birth: 8 April 1967
- Place of birth: Salisbury, England
- Date of death: May 1997 (aged 30)
- Place of death: Salisbury, England
- Height: 5 ft 7 in (1.70 m)
- Position: Defender

Youth career
- AFC Bournemouth

Senior career*
Years	Team	Apps	(Gls)
1985–1991	AFC Bournemouth	50	(2)
1988	→ Colchester United (loan)	6	(1)
- Poole Town
- Farnborough Town
- Dorchester Town
1994–1995	Salisbury City		(0)
- Wimborne Town
- Amesbury Town
- Warminster Town
Total		56	(3)
- * Club domestic league appearances and goals

David Houston Coleman (8 April 1967 – May 1997) was an English footballer who played in the Football League as a defender for AFC Bournemouth and appeared on loan for Colchester United.

== Career ==
Coleman was born in Salisbury, and began his career with AFC Bournemouth after coming through the youth ranks with the club. He made 50 appearances for the Cherries and scored two goals. He joined Colchester United on a month-long loan deal in February 1988, making his debut in a 1–0 home defeat to Burnley on 19 February. He made six appearances for the U's, scoring once in a 2–1 home defeat to Wrexham on 4 March.

Coleman left Bournemouth in 1991 and played for a host of non-league clubs including Poole, Farnborough, Dorchester, Salisbury City, Wimborne, Amesbury and Warminster.

Coleman died in May 1997. A club named Dave Coleman AFC was formed in his memory, playing in the Salisbury & District, Hampshire and Wessex leagues before folding in 2004.
