= Gerry Peyton =

Association football player (born 1956)

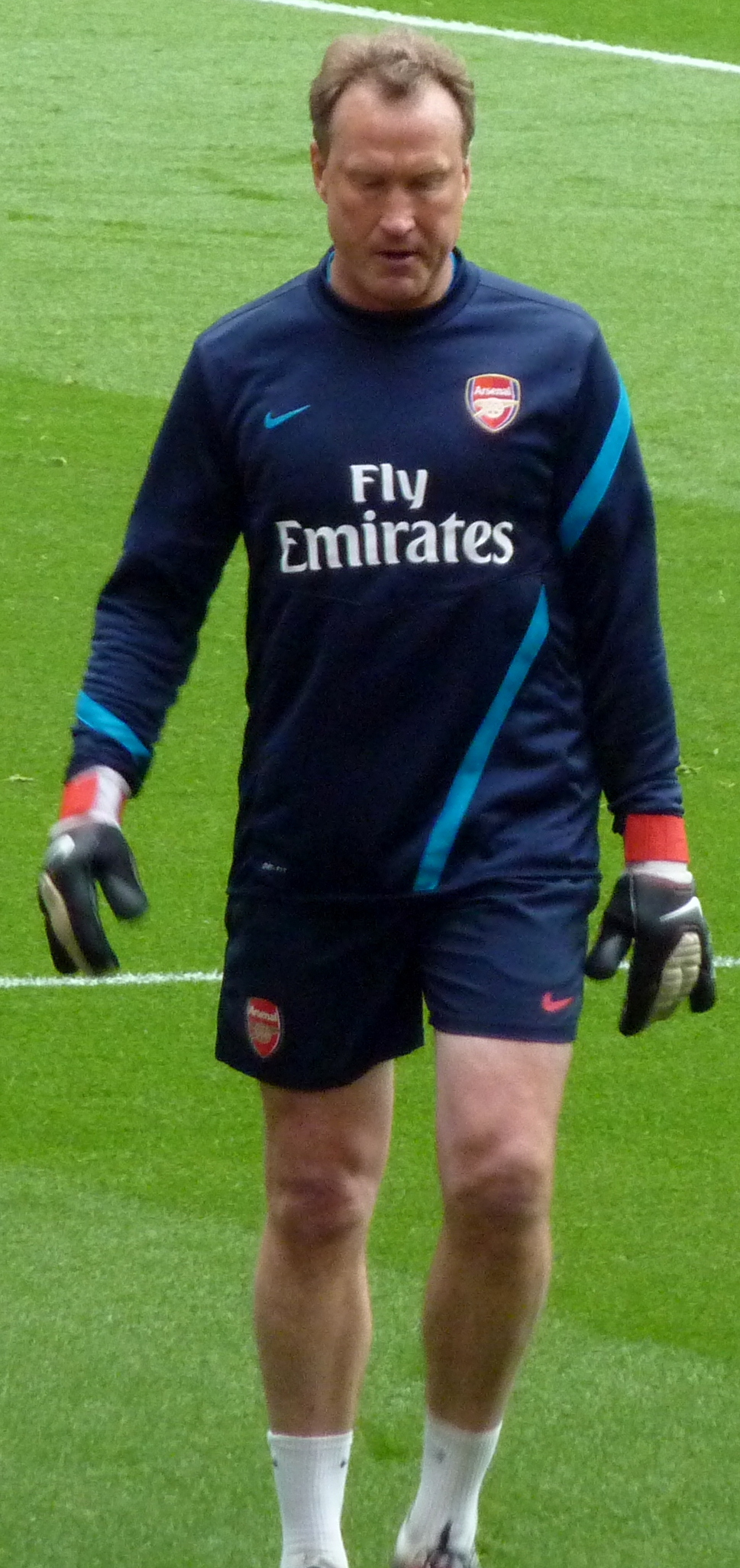
- Peyton in 2012

Personal information
- Full name: Gerald Joseph Peyton
- Date of birth: 20 May 1956 (age 70)
- Place of birth: Birmingham, England
- Height: 6 ft 2 in (1.88 m)
- Position: Goalkeeper

Youth career
- 1974–1975: Atherstone Town

Senior career*
Years	Team	Apps	(Gls)
1975–1977	Burnley	30	(0)
1977–1986	Fulham	345	(0)
1983–1984	→ Southend United (loan)	10	(0)
1986–1991	AFC Bournemouth	202	(0)
1991–1993	Everton	0	(0)
1991–1992	→ Bolton Wanderers (loan)	1	(0)
1992	→ Norwich City (loan)	0	(0)
1992	→ Brentford (loan)	14	(0)
1993	→ Chelsea (loan)	1	(0)
1993	Brentford	5	(0)
1993–1994	West Ham United	0	(0)
Total		597	(0)

International career
1977–1992	Republic of Ireland	33	(0)
1983	Republic of Ireland U21	2	(0)
1992	Republic of Ireland B	1	(0)

Managerial career
- 1995–1997: Jubilo Iwata (goalkeeping coach)
- 1997–1998: Vissel Kobe (goalkeeping coach)
- 1998–2000: AIK (goalkeeping coach)
- 2001–2003: Fulham (goalkeeping coach)
- 2003–2018: Arsenal (goalkeeping coach)
- 2018–2019: Shimizu S-Pulse (coach)
- 2020–2021: Odisha (assistant)
- 2021: Odisha (interim)
- * Club domestic league appearances and goals

Gerald Joseph Peyton (born 20 May 1956) is a football coach and former footballer who is the interim coach of Indian Super League club Odisha FC. A goalkeeper, Peyton had lengthy spells with Fulham and AFC Bournemouth. Following his retirement, he went into coaching and acted as goalkeeping coach for several teams, including Arsenal from 2003 to 2018.

== Club career ==
Born in Birmingham, Peyton's footballing debut came with him featuring for Burnley in July 1976. He thereafter left Turf Moor in October of that year to link up with Fulham. While at the club Peyton was named to the PFA Team of the Year for 1982. He then headed out on loan to Southend United in March where he stayed for another three months. He returned to Craven Cottage in July, ultimately leaving Fulham in the summer of 1986.

Peyton made the move to AFC Bournemouth soon afterwards. With the Cherries Peyton won the Third Division title of 1987. He was also named to the PFA Team of the Year for 1987 while at the club. Peyton as well won Bournemouth's Player of the Year award for 1987.

He eventually moved on to Everton in 1991, from where he was loaned to Bolton Wanderers, Norwich City, Brentford and Chelsea. Peyton returned to Goodison Park in March 1993, eventually being sold to West Ham United in the summer of 1993, where he stayed for a solitary season. He retired from playing soon afterwards. In all, Peyton made over six hundred league appearances.

Peyton then took up the role of goalkeeping coach with Japanese clubs Vissel Kobe and Jubilo Iwata, AIK of Sweden, and, until May 2018, English club Arsenal.

== International career ==
Peyton featured for the Republic of Ireland national team at the 1988 UEFA European Football Championships and the 1990 FIFA World Cup as an unused substitute. At the World Cup Peyton formed part of the famous Irish squad that got to the quarterfinals of the tournament. Altogether, he won 33 international caps for the Republic of Ireland.

== Honours ==
Bournemouth

- Football League Third Division: 1986–87

Individual

- PFA Team of the Year: 1981–82 Third Division, 1986–87 Third Division
- Bournemouth Player of the Year: 1987

== See also ==
- List of Republic of Ireland international footballers born outside the Republic of Ireland
