= Shaun Brooks =

English footballer

Personal information
- Full name: Shaun Brooks
- Date of birth: 9 October 1962 (age 64)
- Place of birth: Reading, England
- Height: 5 ft 7 in (1.70 m)
- Position: Midfielder

Youth career
- Crystal Palace

Senior career*
Years	Team	Apps	(Gls)
1979–1983	Crystal Palace	54	(4)
1983–1987	Leyton Orient	148	(26)
1987–1992	Bournemouth	128	(13)
1992–1994	Dorchester Town		
1994	Bournemouth	1	(0)
1994–1996	Leyton Orient	50	(2)
- Worthing
Total		381	(45)

International career
1978	England Schoolboys	8	(4)
1979–1981	England Youth	7	(2)
- * Club domestic league appearances and goals

Shaun Brooks (born 9 October 1962) is an English former professional footballer who played in the Football League for Crystal Palace, Leyton Orient and Bournemouth. He is the son of Johnny Brooks who was also a professional footballer for several clubs and represented England on three occasions.

== Playing career ==
Brooks began his youth career with Crystal Palace and signed professional terms in October 1979. His senior debut came in a home 1–0 win against Leeds United on 12 April 1980, but it was his only appearance that season. Over the next three seasons, Brooks made 17, (0 goals), 25 (2) and 7 (2) appearances respectively, and in October 1983 after four further games, moved on to Leyton Orient.

In four seasons at Leyton Orient, brooks made 148 League appearances scoring 26 times before moving on to Bournemouth in 1987 for whom he played 128 times (13 goals). He was released by Bournemouth in 1992 and spent two seasons with Dorchester Town before making a brief return to Bournemouth. Brooks finished his League career with Leyton Orient, moving to Worthing in 1996.
