= Richard Cooke (footballer) =

English footballer (born 1965)

Personal information
- Full name: Richard Edward Cooke
- Date of birth: 4 September 1965 (age 61)
- Place of birth: Islington, England
- Height: 5 ft 6 in (1.68 m)
- Position: Winger

Youth career
- –: Tottenham Hotspur

Senior career*
Years	Team	Apps	(Gls)
1983–1987	Tottenham Hotspur	11	(2)
1986	→ Birmingham City	5	(0)
1987–1989	AFC Bournemouth	72	(15)
1989–1991	Luton Town	17	(1)
1991–1993	AFC Bournemouth	53	(2)

International career
1983	England U17	4	(1)
1982–1984	England U18	4	(1)
1985	England U19	3	(0)
1985	England U20	3	(0)
1986	England U21	1	(0)
- * Club domestic league appearances and goals

Richard Edward Cooke (born 4 September 1965) is an English former footballer who played as a winger in the Football League for Tottenham Hotspur, Birmingham City, AFC Bournemouth and Luton Town. He was capped by England at under-age levels including once for the under-21s.

Cooke played for Tottenham Hotspur as an apprentice, and played some first team games. He scored on his debut in November 1983 in an away win at Kenilworth Road versus Luton Town. He was an unused substitute in the 1984 UEFA Cup Final first leg. He later transferred to Luton Town and AFC Bournemouth, where he ended his career. He suffered a knee injury during a game versus Leyton Orient which subsequently ended his playing career. He went on to work as a London taxi driver.

== Honours ==
Tottenham Hotspur

- UEFA Cup: 1983–84

Bournemouth

- Football League Third Division: 1986–87
