= Trevor Aylott =

English footballer (born 1957)

Personal information
- Full name: Trevor Keith Charles Aylott
- Date of birth: 26 November 1957 (age 68)
- Place of birth: Bermondsey, England
- Height: 6 ft 1 in (1.85 m)
- Position: Striker

Youth career
- Fisher Athletic
- 1975–1976: Chelsea

Senior career*
Years	Team	Apps	(Gls)
1976–1979	Chelsea	29	(2)
1979–1982	Barnsley	122	(34)
1982–1983	Millwall	32	(5)
1983–1984	Luton Town	32	(10)
1984–1986	Crystal Palace	53	(12)
1986	→ Barnsley	9	(3)
1986–1990	Bournemouth	147	(27)
1990–1991	Birmingham City	27	(1)
1991–1992	Oxford United	37	(6)
1992–1993	Gillingham	10	(2)
1993	→ Wycombe Wanderers	3	(0)
1993–199x	Bromley	24	(14)
Total		525	(116)
- * Club domestic league appearances and goals

Trevor Keith Charles Aylott (born 26 November 1957) is an English former footballer who played as a striker.

Aylott was born in Bermondsey, London. He began his football career as an apprentice with Chelsea, and went on to score 116 goals league and cup in over 500 appearances in the Football League, playing for Chelsea, Barnsley, Millwall, Luton Town, Crystal Palace, A.F.C. Bournemouth, Birmingham City, Oxford United, Gillingham, Wycombe Wanderers F.C. and Bromley F.C..

In 1976 Trevor came through the ranks of the Chelsea Youth team, to play first team football, alongside fellow youth team players Tommy Langley, David Stride and Lee Frost. Playing alongside Chelsea Legends such as Peter Osgood, Ron Harris, Charlie Cooke and Peter Bonetti, after scoring 2 goals in his first 2 games, one against England Goal Keeper Peter Shilton, he hit a subsequent dry spell and was a sold in 1979 to Barnsley F.C..

Trevor went on to score 34 goals in 122 appearances for Barnsley F.C. before moving back South to the team closest to his boyhood in Bermondsey.

In 1982, Trevor returned to his Bermondsey and his local club Millwall for a record transfer fee at the time of £150,000.

In 1984, he was in new manager Steve Coppell's first batch of signings for Crystal Palace, then a Football League Second Division club, and finished the 1984-85 season as their top scorer with eight league goals (nine in all competitions) as they finished 15th in the league.

In 1986 Harry Redknapp signed Trevor from Crystal Palace to A.F.C. Bournemouth where he went on to play 147 games, the most of any club during his career.

In 1986–87, playing up top with Luther Blissett, the pair helped A.F.C. Bournemouth secure the 3rd division title with a record 97 points at the time.

After retiring from football in the mid-1990s, Aylott acquired his FA coaching badges but subsequently worked as a Black Taxi driver in London for over 20 years. He is now retired and lives in Whitstable in Kent with his Wife Elizabeth.

== Honours ==
Bournemouth

- Football League Third Division: 1986–87
