= 1992 Football League Second Division play-off final =

Association football match in London

- The final took place at Wembley Stadium.
Blackburn Rovers	Leicester City
1	0
- Date: 25 May 1992
- Venue: Wembley Stadium, London
- Referee: George Courtney (Spennymoor)
- Attendance: 68,147
- Weather: Hot

The 1992 Football League Second Division play-off final was an association football match, which was played on 25 May 1992 at Wembley Stadium, London, between Blackburn Rovers and Leicester City. The match was to determine the third and final team to gain promotion from the Football League Second Division, the second tier of English football, to the inaugural season of the Premier League. The top two teams of the 1991–92 Football League Second Division season gained automatic promotion to the Premier League, while the clubs placed from third to sixth place in the table took part in play-off semi-finals; Leicester City had ended the season in fourth position, two places ahead of Blackburn Rovers. The winners of these semi-finals competed for the final place in the Premier League. Derby County and Cambridge United were the losing semi-finalists.

The match was played in warm conditions in front of a Wembley crowd of 68,147 spectators and was refereed by George Courtney who was officiating his final league match. Neither team dominated the early stages of the match and the only goal of the game came moments before half-time when Blackburn's record signing Mike Newell scored from the penalty spot. David Speedie was brought down in the Leicester City penalty area by Steve Walsh and Courtney awarded the spot kick having adjudged the challenge as a foul. In the second half, both sides created numerous chances; with five minutes remaining, Leicester City goalkeeper Carl Muggleton brought down Mark Atkins to concede the second penalty of the match. This time, however, Muggleton saved Newell's strike. Despite late pressure from Leicester City, they failed to score and the match ended 1–0 to Blackburn, and they were promoted to the Premier League.

Blackburn Rovers finished their following season in fourth place in the Premier League. Leicester City ended their next season in sixth place in the 1992–93 Football League First Division, and qualified for the play-off final where they lost 4–3 to Swindon Town.

== Route to the final ==
Football League Second Division final table, leading positions
Pos	Team	Pld	W	D	L	GF	GA	GD	Pts
1	Ipswich Town	46	24	12	10	70	50	+20	84
2	Middlesbrough	46	23	11	12	58	41	+17	80
3	Derby County	46	23	9	14	69	51	+18	78
4	Leicester City	46	23	8	15	62	55	+7	77
5	Cambridge United	46	19	17	10	65	47	+18	74
6	Blackburn Rovers	46	21	11	14	70	53	+17	74

Leicester City finished the regular 1991–92 season in fourth place in the Football League Second Division – the second tier of the English football league system – two places and three points ahead of Blackburn Rovers. Both therefore missed out on the two automatic places for promotion to the Premier League and instead took part in the play-offs, along with Derby County and Cambridge United, to determine the third promoted team. Leicester City finished three points behind Middlesbrough (who were promoted in second place) and seven behind league winners Ipswich Town.

Blackburn Rovers' opposition in their play-off final semi-final were Derby County, with the first leg taking place at Ewood Park, Blackburn, on 10 May 1992. Within fifteen minutes, the visitors were two goals ahead: Marco Gabbiadini scored the opener with a header past Bobby Mimms from a Paul Simpson free kick. Soon after, Tommy Johnson doubled Derby's lead, having been put clear by Simpson with a chip. Scott Sellars then halved the deficit with a free kick which took a significant deflection before beating Steve Sutton in the Derby goal, before Mike Newell levelled the match just before half time. Midway through the second half, David Speedie put the home side ahead for the first time after he capitalised on a defensive mistake from Andy Comyn, before going on to double the lead minutes later, with the match ending 4–2. The second leg took place three days later at the Baseball Ground in Derby. Comyn put the home side ahead with a header from a Johnson cross only for Kevin Moran to equalise from a corner. With fifteen minutes remaining, Ted McMinn scored Derby's second, making it 2–1 on the evening, but with no further goals, it meant that Blackburn won 5–4 on aggregate to qualify for the final. Speedie was attacked by a number of Derby supporters after the final whistle who had encroached onto the pitch.

In the second semi-final, Leicester City faced Cambridge United, the first leg being played at the Abbey Stadium, Cambridge, on 10 May 1992. The visitors took the lead late in the first half: Dion Dublin headed down a cross from a short corner to Kevin Russell who struck a left-footed volley into the far corner of the Cambridge goal. With fifteen minutes of the match remaining, Cambridge's captain Danny O'Shea headed in an equaliser to see the match end in a 1–1 draw. The return leg, at Filbert Street, took place three days later. Mick Heathcote hit the bar for the visitors and Dublin volleyed wide in an opening period dominated by Cambridge, but it was Leicester who took the lead. In the 29th minute, Tommy Wright scored after taking advantage of a Richard Wilkins defensive miskick and seven minutes later Steve Thompson made it 2–0. Three goals in five second-half minutes settled the match: Russell headed Leicester's third goal in the 59th minute, then Wright scored from a Ian Ormondroyd pass before Ormondroyd scored the fifth of the game. It ended 5–0 and Leicester progressed to the final 6–1 on aggregate.

== Match ==
=== Background ===
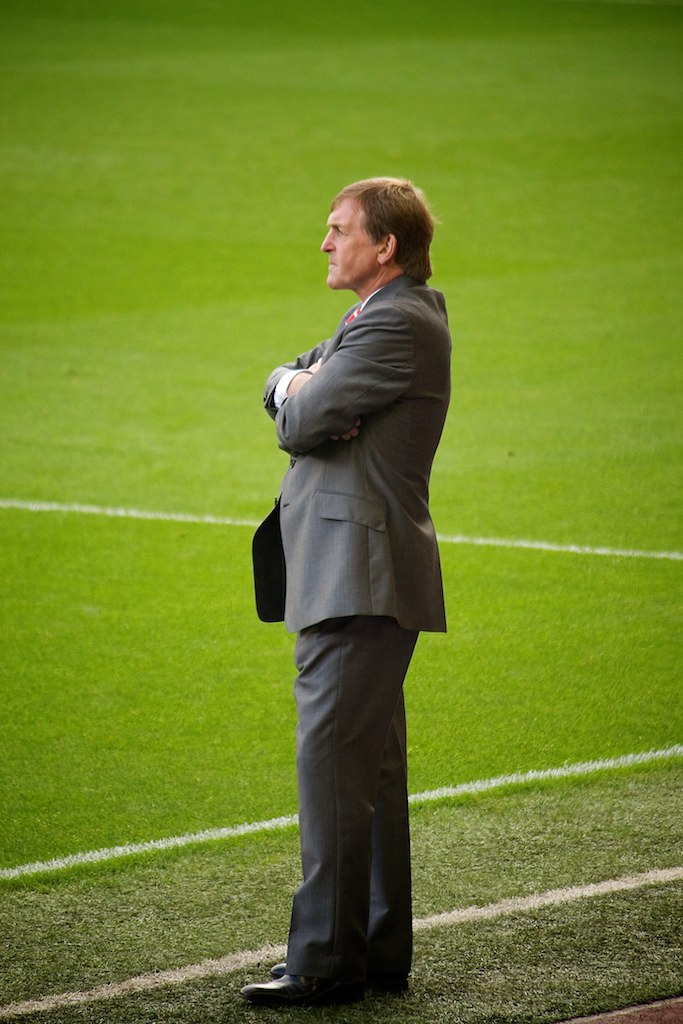
Kenny Dalglish (pictured in 2011) was appointed manager of Blackburn Rovers in October 1991.

Leicester City had not participated in the second tier play-offs before the 1991–92 season, and had played at that level since being relegated in the 1986–87 season. It was also their first trip to Wembley Stadium for 23 years and had failed to win at the national stadium in four attempts. Blackburn Rovers had featured in the play-offs for three consecutive seasons between 1988 and 1990, including a 4–3 defeat by Crystal Palace in the two-legged 1989 final. They had played in the second tier of English football since the 1980–81 season when they were promoted from the Third Division as runners-up, and had not played at the highest level since the 1965–66 season. Leicester City had won both matches between the sides during the regular season: a 3–0 victory at Filbert Street in September 1991 was followed by a 1–0 win at Ewood Park the following April. The leading scorer during the regular season for Leicester City was Tommy Wright with 17 (12 in the league, 2 in the League Cup and 5 in the Full Members' Cup), followed by Paul Kitson (10 goals in all competitions) and Steve Walsh (8 goals in all competitions). Speedie was Blackburn's top goalscorer with 24 goals, 23 in the league and 1 in the League Cup. The teams were competing to become the first play-off winners to be promoted to the newly-formed Premier League, a move which caused Division Two to be renamed Division One, Division Three to be renamed Division Two and so on. Leicester City's manager Brian Little declared that the play-off final was "the biggest game in the club's history" and as a result of a new television deal, victory could have been worth up to £3 million (equivalent to £6.6 million in 2025).

Businessman Jack Walker had bought a 62% controlling stake in Blackburn Rovers in 1991. He convinced former Liverpool and Scotland international Kenny Dalglish to come out of retirement to take the position of manager at the club in October 1991, replacing Phil Parkes who had been caretaker manager since Don Mackay had left the previous month. David Lacey in The Guardian reported that Dalglish spent £5.5 million (equivalent to £12.1 million in 2025) on transfers during the season. This included a club-record £1.1 million (equivalent to £2.4 million in 2025) for Newell from Everton in November 1991, who became the club's first million-pound player, and a similar sum for Roy Wegerle the following March. Other signings included Alan Wright, Colin Hendry, Gordon Cowans, Tim Sherwood, Chris Price, Matt Dickins and Duncan Shearer. Dalglish's counterpart, Brian Little, had been appointed as manager of Leicester City in June 1991, replacing Gordon Lee who had led the club to survival the previous season. Little had led Darlington to back-to-back promotions, as champions of the 1989–90 Football Conference and subsequently the 1990–91 Football League Fourth Division. He signed eight players for Leicester early in the season, including three former Darlington players in Gary Coatsworth, Paul Willis, and Michael Trotter. Before the transfer window closed, Little also brought in Ormondroyd and Phil Gee from Derby County in exchange for Kitson, along with Simon Grayson and Mike Whitlow.

The referee for the final was 50-year-old George Courtney from Spennymoor; he was officiating his fourteenth game at Wembley and last league match before retirement. Parkes, who had remained with Blackburn Rovers as an assistant manager after Dalglish's arrival, led the team out at Wembley. Bookmakers were unable to pick a clear favourite for the match. Blackburn Rovers lined up in a 4–4–2 formation with one change in their starting line-up from their previous game, Price coming in for Lee Richardson in midfield. Wegerle was selected as a substitute in favour of Shearer. Leicester City were unchanged from their semi-final second leg match, adopting a 5–2–3 formation. Blackburn wore all-yellow, while Leicester were in their regular home kit of blue shirts, white shorts and blue socks.

=== First half ===
Leicester City kicked off the final in warm conditions in front of a Wembley crowd of 68,147. Neither side dominated the early period of the game with the first opportunity falling to Leicester City in the fourth minute: a cross-field ball from Gary Mills found Tommy Wright deep on the left wing, whose high cross was caught by Mimms ahead of Ormondroyd and Russell. On seven minutes, Price was fouled by Tommy Wright around 15 yards (14 m) outside the Leicester City penalty area. The resulting direct free kick from Mark Atkins was pushed around the post by Carl Muggleton after it bounced in front of him. Four minutes later, a long pass from May was headed out by Tony James but fell to Atkins whose shot from the edge of the penalty area was blocked by Walsh. In the 14th minute, Newell was brought down by Walsh and the quick free kick found Sellars whose shot went high over the Blackburn crossbar. Ten minutes later, Blackburn's Speedie was fouled by James and Russell deep in Leicester City's half but the free kick from Cowans was cleared. A minute later, a one-two between Price and Newell saw the former's subsequent cross float off the end of the pitch.

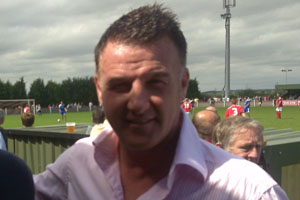
Steve Walsh (pictured in 2010) conceded a penalty after fouling David Speedie in the 45th minute.

In the 28th minute, a long pass from Colin Hill inside his own half found Tommy Wright who was fouled on the edge of the Blackburn penalty area by Alan Wright, but Thompson's free kick came to nothing. Three minutes later Tommy Wright made a run down the left wing and crossed the ball into the Blackburn box but it was gathered by Mimms ahead of Ormondroyd. On 36 minutes, a long pass out of defence by Alan Wright found Newell on the left who ran into the penalty area. He cut inside, wrong-footing two defenders before his goal-bound shot struck Leicester's Walsh in the face and the ball was cleared. Almost immediately, a long pass from Russell from the left was brought under control by Mills on the edge of the Blackburn box but his left-footed strike went wide of the post. A corner from Thompson in the 39th minute was met by James whose header was nodded over the Blackburn crossbar by Ormondroyd. A cross-field pass from Mills was then won by Ormondroyd as May tried to shepherd the ball out for a throw-in. Ormondroyd then beat Hendry in the penalty box and fell, but no penalty was awarded and Blackburn cleared the ball. With less than five minutes of the half remaining, Sellars received the ball just inside his own half and ran deep into the Blackburn half before releasing Alan Wright whose cross was plucked out of the air by Muggleton in the Leicester goal, ahead of Speedie. In the last minute of the first half, a long ball from Hendry was headed back by Newell to Speedie who was brought down by Walsh in the area to win a penalty. Newell took the spot kick, striking the ball to the bottom-right corner of the goal past Muggleton to make it 1–0.

=== Second half ===
Neither side made any changes at half time and Blackburn kicked off the second half, and dominated the early stages. In the 47th minute, the referee played advantage after Tommy Wright was fouled by May, allowing the ball to finally run to Russell on the right wing whose cross was gathered by Mimms. Two minutes later a goal kick from Mimms was headed by Hendry but fell to Thompson who struck it high and wide from around 25 yards (23 m). A 50th minute corner from Whitlow bounced around in the box before being cleared over the crossbar by Alan Wright. Four minutes later Tommy Wright was brought down by May deep in the Blackburn half which was adjudged a foul. Mimms got a hand to Whitlow's outswinging free kick but the ball fell to Grayson on the edge of the area: his off-target first-time shot was deflected by James then Newell towards his own goal before the ball was cleared off the line by Hendry. On 56 minutes, a free kick from Whitlow was headed towards the Leicester City goal by Ormondroyd before being cleared by Cowans. Five minutes later, a clearance from Hendry fell to Speedie and Blackburn found themselves with a three-on-one situation: instead of passing to Cowans, Speedie opted to try to beat the last man, Mills, who brought him down illegally. The foul earned Mills the first yellow card of the afternoon, but the free kick from Sellars was caught by Muggleton. In the 65th minute, a long pass from Moran deep in his own half was collected by Walsh but his shot was off-target. Seconds later, a misplaced pass in the Leicester defence was worked to Sellars whose chipped shot went high over the crossbar.

Leicester made the first change of the afternoon in the 67th minute when Gee came on to replace James. Atkins became the second player to be booked a minute later when he pulled back Mills. In the 71st minute, Blackburn cleared a long through but the ball fell to Thompson who passed the ball back to Grayson who struck wide of the left-hand post from around 20 yards (18 m). A minute later, Mills picked up a loose ball around the half-way line and ran into the Blackburn half unchallenged until Hendry brought him down outside the penalty area: the Blackburn defender was shown a yellow card for the foul. The resulting free kick from Thompson was headed over the bar by Walsh. Gee then headed the ball directly into the arms of Mimms from 8 yards (7.3 m). On 76 minutes, Atkins made a long pass which found Newell on the left flank in an advanced position: Newell ran on with the ball and his attempted chip was pushed away by Muggleton. On 77 minutes, a cross-field pass from Speedie was collected by Price on the edge of the Leicester City penalty area, but Muggleton gathered his low cross. Two minutes later May's long ball forward found Atkins in space but his diagonal shot was caught in the Leicester goal. With eleven minutes to go, Speedie was brought down by Grayson after being sent free down the left wing by a pass from Sellars. Speedie was then booked for pushing Grayson to the ground. Leicester's Gee then crossed from the corner of the Blackburn penalty area and Ormondroyd's header back across the face of goal was cleared by Hendry just ahead of Russell. With six minutes remaining, Newell passed to Atkins who ran into the area and was fouled by Muggleton who conceded the second penalty of the match. Sellars was then replaced by Richardson. Newell's spot kick was straight at Muggleton who deflected it onto the post, to keep the score at 1–0. Newell then received a goal kick from Mimms deep in Leicester territory, his cross was nudged on by Speedie to Atkins whose shot was tipped just past the post low to Muggleton's left. In the 89th minute, Tommy Wright's shot from inside the box went just over the Blackburn crossbar. Despite late pressure from Leicester City who were pushing for the equaliser, it was to no avail as the match ended 1–0 and Blackburn Rovers secured promotion.

=== Details ===
25 May 1992
15:00 BST

Blackburn Rovers	1–0	Leicester City
Newell 45' (pen.)

Wembley Stadium, London
Attendance: 68,147
Referee: George Courtney

Blackburn Rovers	Leicester City

GK	1	(England) Bobby Mimms
RB	2	(England) David May
LB	3	(England) Alan Wright
CM	4	(England) Gordon Cowans
CB	5	(Republic of Ireland) Kevin Moran (c)
CB	6	(Scotland) Colin Hendry	(yellow card) 73'
RM	7	(England) Chris Price
CM	8	(England) Mark Atkins	(yellow card) 68'
FW	9	(Scotland) David Speedie	(yellow card) 80'
FW	10	(England) Mike Newell
LM	11	(England) Scott Sellars	(substituted off) 85'
Substitutes:
MF	12	(England) Lee Richardson	(substituted on) 85'
FW	14	(United States) Roy Wegerle
Manager:
(Scotland) Kenny Dalglish

GK	1	(England) Carl Muggleton
RB	2	(England) Gary Mills (c)	(yellow card) 60'
LB	3	(England) Mike Whitlow
CB	4	(Northern Ireland) Colin Hill
CB	5	(England) Steve Walsh
CB	6	(England) Tony James	(substituted off) 67'
RM	7	(England) Steve Thompson
CM	8	(England) Simon Grayson
FW	9	(Scotland) Tommy Wright
FW	10	(England) Ian Ormondroyd
LM	11	(England) Kevin Russell
Substitutes:
MF	12	(England) David Oldfield
FW	14	(England) Phil Gee		(substituted on) 67'
Manager:
(England) Brian Little

== Post-match ==
Walsh accused Speedie of diving: "Speedie's team will be delighted with him. He did what all strikers should do. Took a dive." Speedie defended his actions: "I got the ball in the box, turned him and the fellow pushed me. As far as I'm concerned, it was a penalty." Defeated manager Little was disappointed but said "there is no way [he] would point the finger at anyone." His counterpart Dalglish said: "Speedie had a clear shot at goal. The referee has given the penalty, we took it and we scored." Courtney said that he believed made the correct decision, noting that he thought "Walsh took [Speedie] out and that is what [he] gave." Walker immediately made European football the next target for Dalglish declaring "we want Europe now".

Blackburn Rovers finished their following season in fourth place in the inaugural Premier League, the highest league position achieved by a play-off winner and scoring more goals than any other team in the division. Two years later, in the 1994–95 season, they became the first club promoted through the play-offs to win the Premier League. Leicester City ended their next season in sixth place in the 1992–93 Football League First Division, and qualified for the play-off final where they lost 4–3 to Swindon Town.
