= 1991–92 Leicester City F.C. season =

1991–92 season of Leicester City

Leicester City
1991–92 season
- Chairman: Martin George
- Manager: Brian Little
- Second Division: 4th (qualified for play-offs)
- Play-offs: Runners-up
- FA Cup: Fourth round
- League Cup: Second round
- Full Members Cup: Northern Area final
- Top goalscorer: League: Wright (12); All: Wright (19)
- Highest home attendance: 21,844 vs Newcastle United (2 May 1992, Second Division)
- Lowest home attendance: 3,995 vs Barnsley (2 Oct 1991, Full Members Cup)
- Average home league attendance: 15,184

During the 1991–92 English football season, Leicester City F.C. competed in the Football League Second Division.

== Season summary ==
After narrowly avoiding relegation to the Third Division the previous season, Leicester City appointed Darlington manager Brian Little as the replacement for David Pleat, who had been sacked during the previous season. Little turned Leicester's fortunes around and the club finished in fourth, qualifying for the play-offs. After drawing 1–1 with fifth-placed Cambridge United at Abbey Stadium, Leicester crushed United 5–0 in the return leg at Filbert Street to qualify for the final. Leicester faced Blackburn Rovers at Wembley, but lost 1–0 from a penalty from former City player Mike Newell, thus denying Leicester a place in the inaugural season of the Premiership.

== Final league table ==
Pos	Team	Pld	W	D	L	GF	GA	GD	Pts	Qualification or relegation
2	Middlesbrough (P)	46	23	11	12	58	41	+17	80	Promotion to the FA Premier League
3	Derby County	46	23	9	14	69	51	+18	78	Qualification for the Second Division play-offs
4	Leicester City	46	23	8	15	62	55	+7	77	Qualification for the Second Division play-offs
5	Cambridge United	46	19	17	10	65	47	+18	74	Qualification for the Second Division play-offs
6	Blackburn Rovers (O, P)	46	21	11	14	70	53	+17	74	Qualification for the Second Division play-offs

Rules for classification: 1) Points; 2) Goal difference; 3) Goals scored
(O) Play-off winners; (P) Promoted

== Results ==
Leicester City's score comes first

=== Legend ===
Win	Draw	Loss

=== Football League Second Division ===
Date	Opponent	Venue	Result	Attendance	Scorers
17 August 1991	Swindon Town	A	0–0	12,426	
24 August 1991	Plymouth Argyle	H	2–0	11,852	Gibson, Kitson
31 August 1991	Southend United	A	2–1	6,944	Wright, Walsh
4 September 1991	Grimsby Town	H	2–0	16,242	Fitzpatrick, Gibson
7 September 1991	Bristol City	H	2–1	17,815	Gibson, Fitzpatrick
14 September 1991	Middlesbrough	A	0–3	16,633	
17 September 1991	Barnsley	A	1–3	9,318	Kelly
21 September 1991	Blackburn Rovers	H	3–0	13,278	Walsh, Kitson, Gordon
29 September 1991	Cambridge United	A	1–5	12,175	Gordon
5 October 1991	Charlton Athletic	H	0–2	11,467	
12 October 1991	Newcastle United	A	0–2	16,966	
19 October 1991	Wolverhampton Wanderers	H	3–0	14,428	Gordon (2), Wright
26 October 1991	Oxford United	A	2–1	5,206	Wright, Thompson
30 October 1991	Brighton & Hove Albion	A	2–1	6,424	Walsh, Kitson
2 November 1991	Ipswich Town	H	2–2	11,331	Kitson, Oldfield
5 November 1991	Portsmouth	A	0–1	7,147	
9 November 1991	Watford	A	1–0	9,271	Kitson
20 November 1991	Bristol Rovers	H	1–1	10,950	Wright
23 November 1991	Port Vale	H	0–1	11,450	
30 November 1991	Derby County	A	2–1	19,306	Fitzpatrick, Walsh
7 December 1991	Millwall	H	1–1	12,127	Gordon
14 December 1991	Sunderland	A	0–1	15,094	
26 December 1991	Brighton & Hove Albion	H	2–1	16,767	Mauchlen, Thompson
28 December 1991	Southend United	H	2–0	15,635	Oldfield, Smith
1 January 1992	Bristol Rovers	A	1–1	6,673	Oldfield
11 January 1992	Plymouth Argyle	A	2–2	5,486	Thompson, Turner (own goal)
18 January 1992	Swindon Town	H	3–1	14,226	Fitzpatrick, Wright (2)
1 February 1992	Wolverhampton Wanderers	A	0–1	18,574	
8 February 1992	Oxford United	H	2–1	12,128	Kitson, Wright
15 February 1992	Port Vale	A	2–1	8,084	Russell (2)
22 February 1992	Derby County	H	1–2	18,148	Mills (pen)
29 February 1992	Millwall	A	0–2	7,562	
11 March 1992	Portsmouth	H	2–2	14,207	Mills, Russell
14 March 1992	Ipswich Town	A	0–0	16,174	
17 March 1992	Grimsby Town	A	1–0	8,377	Wright
21 March 1992	Watford	H	1–2	14,519	Walsh
27 March 1992	Tranmere Rovers	A	2–1	9,061	Ormondroyd, Gee
1 April 1992	Middlesbrough	H	2–1	19,352	Mills (pen), Wright
4 April 1992	Bristol City	A	1–2	13,020	Oldfield
8 April 1992	Sunderland	H	3–2	16,533	Wright, Mills (2, 1 pen)
11 April 1992	Barnsley	H	3–1	14,438	Walsh, Mills (pen), Wright
15 April 1992	Tranmere Rovers	H	1–0	18,555	Russell
18 April 1992	Blackburn Rovers	A	1–0	18,075	Russell
21 April 1992	Cambridge United	H	2–1	15,445	Wright, Gee
25 April 1992	Charlton Athletic	A	0–2	15,537	
2 May 1992	Newcastle United	H	1–2	21,844	Walsh

=== Second Division play-offs ===
Round	Date	Opponent	Venue	Result	Attendance	Scorers
SF 1st Leg	10 May 1992	Cambridge United	A	1–1	9,225	Russell
SF 2nd Leg	13 May 1992	Cambridge United	H	5–0 (won 6–1 on agg)	21,024	Wright (2), Thompson, Russell, Ormondroyd
F	25 May 1992	Blackburn Rovers	N	0–1	68,147	

=== FA Cup ===
Round	Date	Opponent	Venue	Result	Attendance	Goalscorers
R3	4 January 1992	Crystal Palace	H	1–0	19,613	Smith
R4	25 January 1992	Bristol City	H	1–2	19,313	Kitson

=== League Cup ===
Round	Date	Opponent	Venue	Result	Attendance	Goalscorers
R1 1st Leg	21 August 1991	Maidstone United	H	3–0	9,610	Kitson, Kelly, Mills
R1 2nd Leg	28 August 1991	Maidstone United	A	1–0	1,638	Kitson
R2 1st Leg	25 September 1991	Arsenal	H	1–1	20,679	Walsh
R2 2nd Leg	8 October 1991	Arsenal	A	0–2	28,580	

=== Full Members Cup ===
Round	Date	Opponent	Venue	Result	Attendance	Goalscorers
R1	2 October 1991	Barnsley	H	4–3	3,995	Wright (2), Kelly, Walsh
R2	23 October 1991	Port Vale	H	4–0	4,858	Wright (2), Kitson, Gordon
R3	27 November 1991	Everton	H	2–1	13,242	Oldfield, Thompson
NSF	8 January 1992	Notts County	A	2–1	11,559	Wright, Fitzpatrick
NF 1st Leg	12 February 1992	Nottingham Forest	H	1–1	19,537	Gordon
NF 2nd Leg	26 February 1992	Nottingham Forest	A	0–2	21,562	

== Squad ==
Note: Flags indicate national team as defined under FIFA eligibility rules; some limited exceptions apply. Players may hold more than one non-FIFA nationality.

Pos.	Nation	Player
GK	ENG	Russell Hoult
GK	ENG	Carl Muggleton
GK	ENG	Kevin Poole
DF	ENG	Gary Coatsworth
DF	ENG	Paul Fitzpatrick
DF	ENG	Simon Grayson
DF	ENG	Colin Hill
DF	ENG	Steve Holden
DF	ENG	Tony James
DF	ENG	Des Linton
DF	ENG	Nick Platnauer
DF	ENG	Richard Smith
DF	ENG	Steve Walsh
DF	ENG	Mike Whitlow
DF	ENG	Jimmy Willis
MF	ENG	Colin Gibson
MF	SCO	Ally Mauchlen

Pos.	Nation	Player
MF	ENG	Gary Mills
MF	ENG	Scott Oakes
MF	ENG	David Oldfield
MF	ENG	Jason Peake
MF	NIR	Paul Ramsey
MF	ENG	Paul Reid
MF	ENG	Steve Thompson
MF	ENG	Michael Trotter
MF	SCO	Tommy Wright
FW	ENG	Phil Gee
FW	ENG	Colin Gordon
FW	IRL	David Kelly
FW	ENG	Paul Kitson
FW	ENG	Ian Ormondroyd
FW	ENG	Kevin Russell
FW	ENG	Martin Williams

== Transfers ==
=== In ===
Date	Pos	Name	From	Fee
19 July 1991	DF	Nick Platnauer	Notts County	Free transfer
30 July 1991	FW	Ashley Ward	Manchester City	£80,000
30 July 1991	GK	Kevin Poole	Middlesbrough	£40,000
22 October 1991	MF	Steve Thompson	Luton Town	Signed
20 December 1991	DF	Jimmy Willis	Darlington	£100,000
11 March 1992	FW	Ian Ormondroyd	Derby County	Signed
11 March 1992	FW	Phil Gee	Derby County	Transfer
13 March 1992	DF	Simon Grayson	Leeds United	£50,000
27 March 1992	DF	Mike Whitlow	Leeds United	£250,000

=== Out ===
Date	Pos	Name	To	Fee
1 July 1991	DF	Tony Spearing	Plymouth Argyle	Free transfer
1 August 1991	DF	Des Lyttle	Worcester City	Free transfer
7 August 1991	GK	Martin Hodge	Hartlepool United	Free transfer
13 August 1991	DF	Ian Baraclough	Grimsby Town	Free transfer
23 August 1991	MF	Paul Ramsey	Cardiff City	£100,000
13 September 1991	FW	Martin Williams	Luton Town	Free transfer
22 October 1991	DF	Des Linton	Luton Town	Signed
22 October 1991	MF	Scott Oakes	Luton Town	Signed
4 December 1991	FW	David Kelly	Newcastle United	£250,000
11 March 1992	FW	Paul Kitson	Derby County	£1,300,000

Transfers in: ▼£520,000
Transfers out: ▲£1,650,000
Total spending: ▲£1,130,000
