= 1992–93 Leicester City F.C. season =

1992–93 season of Leicester City

Leicester City
1992–93 season
- Chairman: Martin George
- Manager: Brian Little
- Stadium: Filbert Street
- First Division: 6th
- FA Cup: Third round
- League Cup: Third round
- Top goalscorer: League: Walsh (15); All: Walsh (16)
- Highest home attendance: 19,687 vs. Newcastle United (31 October 1992)
- Lowest home attendance: 10,284 vs. Birmingham City (28 February 1993)
- Average home league attendance: 15,326
Home colours

During the 1992–93 English football season, Leicester City F.C. competed in the Football League First Division.

== Season summary ==
Leicester suffered another playoff final defeat at the end of the 1992–93 Division One campaign. They managed to draw level with Swindon Town in the second half after trailing 3–0, only to concede another controversial penalty as they did in last season's play-off final.

== Final league table ==
Pos	Team	Pld	W	D	L	GF	GA	GD	Pts	Qualification or relegation
4	Tranmere Rovers	46	23	10	13	72	56	+16	79	Qualification for the First Division play-offs
5	Swindon Town (O, P)	46	21	13	12	74	59	+15	76	Qualification for the First Division play-offs
6	Leicester City	46	22	10	14	71	64	+7	76	Qualification for the First Division play-offs
7	Millwall	46	18	16	12	65	53	+12	70	
8	Derby County	46	19	9	18	68	57	+11	66	

Source: rsssf.com
Rules for classification: 1) Points; 2) Goals scored; 3) Goal difference
(O) Play-off winners; (P) Promoted

== Results ==
Leicester City's score comes first

=== Legend ===
Win	Draw	Loss

=== Football League First Division ===
Date	Opponent	Venue	Result	Attendance	Scorers
15 August 1992	Luton Town	H	2–1	17,428	Walsh, Whitlow
18 August 1992	Wolverhampton Wanderers	A	0–3	15,821	
22 August 1992	Notts County	A	1–1	10,501	Gee
26 August 1992	Derby County	H	3–2	17,739	Gee (2), Thompson
29 August 1992	Portsmouth	H	1–0	14,780	Davison
5 September 1992	Southend United	A	1–3	5,119	Gee
13 September 1992	Wolverhampton Wanderers	H	0–0	12,965	
19 September 1992	Brentford	H	0–0	12,972	
26 September 1992	Watford	A	3–0	8,715	Davison, Lowe, Ormondroyd
3 October 1992	Barnsley	H	2–1	12,290	Grayson, Davison
10 October 1992	Birmingham City	A	2–0	13,443	Davison, Joachim
18 October 1992	Peterborough United	H	0–2	10,952	
24 October 1992	Bristol City	A	1–2	10,408	Davison
31 October 1992	Newcastle United	H	2–1	19,687	Lowe, Davison
4 November 1992	Charlton Athletic	A	0–2	4,213	
7 November 1992	Tranmere Rovers	H	0–1	13,538	
15 November 1992	Sunderland	A	2–1	14,945	Joachim (2)
21 November 1992	Cambridge United	H	2–2	12,175	Thompson (2, 1 pen)
28 November 1992	Bristol Rovers	H	0–1	12,848	
5 December 1992	Grimsby Town	A	3–1	7,488	Oldfield (2), Ormondroyd
13 December 1992	Oxford United	A	0–0	7,949	
20 December 1992	Swindon Town	H	4–2	15,088	Oldfield, Lowe (2), Joachim
28 December 1992	Millwall	A	0–2	12,230	
9 January 1993	Brentford	A	3–1	8,517	Walsh, Thompson (2)
16 January 1993	Watford	H	5–2	12,854	Philpott (2), Walsh, Lowe, Joachim
23 January 1993	Notts County	H	1–1	15,716	Joachim
30 January 1993	West Ham United	H	1–2	18,838	Lowe
6 February 1993	Luton Town	A	0–2	9,140	
20 February 1993	Portsmouth	A	1–1	14,160	Philpott
24 February 1993	Derby County	A	0–2	17,507	
28 February 1993	Birmingham City	H	2–1	10,284	Walsh, Lowe
6 March 1993	Barnsley	A	3–2	9,452	Coatsworth (2), Walsh
10 March 1993	Sunderland	H	3–2	15,609	Walsh (2), Lowe
13 March 1993	Tranmere Rovers	A	3–2	9,680	Walsh, Thompson, Lowe
20 March 1993	Grimsby Town	H	3–0	15,930	Walsh, Oldfield, Groves (own goal)
23 March 1993	Cambridge United	A	3–1	6,836	Joachim, Lowe (2)
27 March 1993	Charlton Athletic	H	3–1	17,290	Joachim, Walsh (2)
3 April 1993	Bristol Rovers	A	0–0	5,270	
7 April 1993	Oxford United	H	2–1	16,611	Thompson (pen), Walsh
11 April 1993	West Ham United	A	0–3	13,971	
14 April 1993	Millwall	H	3–0	19,611	Agnew, Thompson, Oldfield
17 April 1993	Swindon Town	A	1–1	15,428	Walsh
20 April 1993	Southend United	H	4–1	18,003	Joachim (2), Walsh, Edwards (own goal)
24 April 1993	Peterborough United	A	0–3	15,445	
1 May 1993	Bristol City	H	0–0	19,294	
9 May 1993	Newcastle United	A	1–7	30,129	Walsh

=== First Division play-offs ===
Round	Date	Opponent	Venue	Result	Attendance	Scorers
SF 1st Leg	16 May 1993	Portsmouth	H	1–0	24,538	Joachim
SF 2nd Leg	19 May 1993	Portsmouth	A	2–2 (won 3–2 on agg)	25,438	Ormondroyd, Thompson
F	31 May 1993	Swindon Town	N	3–4	73,802	Joachim, Walsh, Thompson

16 May 1993: Play-off semi final 1st leg against Portsmouth played at City Ground due to reconstruction work at Filbert Street

=== FA Cup ===
Round	Date	Opponent	Venue	Result	Attendance	Goalscorers
R3	13 January 1993	Barnsley	H	2–2	19,137	Thompson (pen), Oldfield
R3R	20 January 1993	Barnsley	A	1–1 (lost 4–5 on pens)	15,238	Joachim

=== League Cup ===
Round	Date	Opponent	Venue	Result	Attendance	Goalscorers
R2 First Leg	23 September 1992	Peterborough United	H	2–0	10,366	Lowe, Thompson
R2 Second Leg	6 October 1992	Peterborough United	A	1–2	6,936	Joachim
R3	27 October 1992	Sheffield Wednesday	A	1–7	17,326	Davison

=== Anglo-Italian Cup ===
Round	Date	Opponent	Venue	Result	Attendance	Goalscorers
PR Group 2	2 September 1992	Grimsby Town	H	4–0	4,112	Davison (2), Gee (2)
PR Group 2	30 September 1992	Newcastle United	A	0–4	14,046	

== Squad ==
Note: Flags indicate national team as defined under FIFA eligibility rules; some limited exceptions apply. Players may hold more than one non-FIFA nationality.

Pos.	Nation	Player
GK	ENG	Carl Muggleton
MF	ENG	Gary Mills
DF	ENG	Mike Whitlow
DF	ENG	Richard Smith
DF	ENG	Steve Walsh
DF	NIR	Colin Hill
MF	ENG	David Oldfield
MF	ENG	Steve Thompson
FW	ENG	Bobby Davison
FW	ENG	Ian Ormondroyd
FW	ENG	Phil Gee
DF	ENG	Simon Grayson

Pos.	Nation	Player
MF	ENG	Michael Trotter
GK	ENG	Russell Hoult
DF	ENG	Neil Lewis
MF	ENG	David Lowe
MF	ENG	Colin Gibson
FW	ENG	Julian Joachim
GK	ENG	Kevin Poole
MF	ENG	Lee Philpott
DF	ENG	Tony James
MF	ENG	Steve Agnew
DF	ENG	Gary Coatsworth
DF	ENG	Jimmy Willis

=== Left club during the season ===
Note: Flags indicate national team as defined under FIFA eligibility rules; some limited exceptions apply. Players may hold more than one non-FIFA nationality.

Pos.	Nation	Player
FW	ENG	Colin Gordon (to Kidderminster Harriers)
DF	ENG	Nick Platnauer (to Scunthorpe United)

Pos.	Nation	Player
FW	ENG	Ashley Ward (to Crewe Alexandra)
DF	ENG	Paul Fitzpatrick (to Birmingham City)
