= 1989–90 Leicester City F.C. season =

1989–90 season of Leicester City

Leicester City
1989–90 season
- Chairman: Terry Shipman
- Manager: David Pleat
- Second Division: 13th
- FA Cup: Third round
- League Cup: Second round
- Full Members Cup: First round
- Top goalscorer: McAllister (10)
- Average home league attendance: 11,715

During the 1989–90 English football season, Leicester City competed in the Football League Second Division.

== Season summary ==
The Foxes had a very poor start to the season, with only one win from the first twelve league games that saw Leicester bottom of the second tier of English football for the first time since February 1915. At the end of the year, the Foxes found form with six wins from Seven games guided Leicester to mid-table and stayed there for most of the season, settling for a 13th-place finish. In March 1990, there was another chapter in the club's boardroom history when chairman Terry Shipman's father Len died at the age of 87.

== Final league table ==
Pos	Team	Pld	W	D	L	GF	GA	GD	Pts
11	Port Vale	46	15	16	15	62	57	+5	61
12	Portsmouth	46	15	16	15	62	65	−3	61
13	Leicester City	46	15	14	17	67	79	−12	59
14	Hull City	46	14	16	16	58	65	−7	58
15	Watford	46	14	15	17	58	60	−2	57

Source: Statto
Rules for classification: 1) Points; 2) Goal difference; 3) Goals scored

== Results ==
Leicester City's score comes first

=== Legend ===
Win	Draw	Loss

=== Football League Second Division ===
Date	Opponent	Venue	Result	Attendance	Scorers
19 August 1989	Hull City	A	1–1	8,158	Clarke
23 August 1989	Blackburn Rovers	H	0–1	11,411	
26 August 1989	Newcastle United	H	2–2	13,693	McAllister, Spearing
2 September 1989	Watford	A	1–3	10,252	McAllister
9 September 1989	West Bromwich Albion	H	1–3	10,700	Reid
16 September 1989	Bradford City	A	0–2	8,732	
23 September 1989	Brighton & Hove Albion	H	1–0	8,926	Glover
27 September 1989	Sunderland	H	2–3	10,843	Williams, Paris
30 September 1989	Oldham Athletic	A	0–1	6,407	
7 October 1989	Port Vale	A	1–2	7,268	Reid
14 October 1989	Oxford United	H	0–0	8,199	
17 October 1989	Plymouth Argyle	A	1–3	10,037	Reid
21 October 1989	Swindon Town	H	2–1	8,547	Reid (2)
28 October 1989	Barnsley	A	2–2	6,856	North, Wright
1 November 1989	Wolverhampton Wanderers	H	0–0	16,580	
4 November 1989	Sheffield United	A	1–1	15,971	North
11 November 1989	Leeds United	H	4–3	18,032	Ramsey (2), Moran, McAllister
18 November 1989	Ipswich Town	H	0–1	11,661	
25 November 1989	Stoke City	A	1–0	12,264	Mills
2 December 1989	Hull City	H	2–1	8,616	Paris, McAllister (pen)
9 December 1989	Blackburn Rovers	A	4–2	7,538	McAllister (pen), Morgan, Campbell, Wright
16 December 1989	Middlesbrough	A	1–4	11,428	McAllister (pen)
26 December 1989	Bournemouth	H	2–1	14,128	Campbell, Mills
30 December 1989	West Ham United	H	1–0	16,925	Mauchlen
1 January 1990	Portsmouth	A	3–2	9,387	Moran, Campbell (2)
13 January 1990	Newcastle United	A	4–5	20,785	Wright, Walsh, McAllister, Campbell
20 January 1990	Watford	H	1–1	11,466	Mills
10 February 1990	Bradford City	A	1–1	10,281	Oldfield
17 February 1990	Brighton & Hove Albion	A	0–1	7,498	
21 February 1990	West Bromwich Albion	A	1–0	10,902	Oldfield
24 February 1990	Stoke City	H	2–1	12,245	Oldfield, Reid
3 March 1990	Ipswich Town	A	2–2	12,237	Walsh, Oldfield
10 March 1990	Sunderland	A	2–2	13,017	Mills, James
17 March 1990	Port Vale	H	2–0	10,076	North, Walsh
21 March 1990	Oxford United	A	2–4	5,744	Reid, McAllister
24 March 1990	Plymouth Argyle	H	1–1	9,395	McAllister (pen)
31 March 1990	Swindon Town	A	1–1	8,561	Kelly
3 April 1990	Oldham Athletic	H	3–0	10,368	North, Kelly (2)
7 April 1990	Barnsley	H	2–2	8,620	Kelly (2)
10 April 1990	Wolverhampton Wanderers	A	0–5	18,175	
14 April 1990	Portsmouth	H	1–1	8,407	James
17 April 1990	Bournemouth	A	3–2	6,781	North, Oldfield, Reid
21 April 1990	Middlesbrough	H	2–1	9,203	Kelly (2)
28 April 1990	Leeds United	A	1–2	32,597	McAllister
2 May 1990	West Ham United	A	1–3	17,939	Ramsey
5 May 1990	Sheffield United	H	2–5	21,134	Mills, North

=== FA Cup ===
Round	Date	Opponent	Venue	Result	Attendance	Goalscorers
R3	6 January 1990	Barnsley	H	1–2	16,278	Paris

=== League Cup ===
Round	Date	Opponent	Venue	Result	Attendance	Goalscorers
R2 First Leg	19 September 1989	Crystal Palace	A	2–1	7,382	Kitson, Reid
R2 Second Leg	4 October 1989	Crystal Palace	H	2–3 (lost on away goals)	10,283	Clarke, Paris

=== Full Members Cup ===
Round	Date	Opponent	Venue	Result	Attendance	Goalscorers
R1	14 November 1989	Charlton Athletic	A	1–2	1,565	Campbell

== Squad ==
Note: Flags indicate national team as defined under FIFA eligibility rules; some limited exceptions apply. Players may hold more than one non-FIFA nationality.

Pos.	Nation	Player
GK	ENG	Martin Hodge
DF	ENG	Rob Johnson
DF	ENG	Tony Spearing
MF	SCO	Ali Mauchlen (captain)
DF	ENG	Alan Paris
DF	SCO	Allan Evans
FW	ENG	Kevin Russell
MF	SCO	Tommy Wright
MF	SCO	Gary McAllister
MF	ENG	Gary Mills
MF	ENG	Paul Reid
MF	NIR	Paul Ramsey
DF	ENG	Steve Walsh
DF	ENG	Tony James
DF	ENG	Simon Morgan

Pos.	Nation	Player
FW	ENG	Paul Kitson
FW	SCO	Lee Glover (on loan from Nottingham Forest)
MF	ENG	Darren Williams
FW	ENG	Marc North
MF	ENG	Scott Oakes
GK	ENG	Carl Muggleton
FW	ENG	Paul Moran (on loan from Tottenham Hotspur)
FW	ENG	Kevin Campbell (on loan from Arsenal)
MF	ENG	Jason Peake
DF	ENG	Ian Baraclough
MF	ENG	David Oldfield
FW	IRL	David Kelly
DF	ENG	Richard Smith
DF	ENG	Des Linton
MF	ENG	Gary Fitzpatrick

=== Left club during the season ===
Note: Flags indicate national team as defined under FIFA eligibility rules; some limited exceptions apply. Players may hold more than one non-FIFA nationality.

Pos.	Nation	Player
FW	ENG	Steve Wilkinson (to Mansfield Town)
MF	ENG	Dave Puttnam (to Lincoln City)

Pos.	Nation	Player
FW	ENG	Wayne Clarke (to Manchester City)
