= 1988–89 Leicester City F.C. season =

1988–89 season of Leicester City

Leicester City
1988–89 season
- Chairman: Terry Shipman
- Manager: David Pleat
- Second Division: 15th
- FA Cup: Third round
- League Cup: Fourth round
- Full Members Cup: First round
- Top goalscorer: League: Newell (13); All: Newell (15)
- Average home league attendance: 10,701

During the 1988–89 English football season, Leicester City F.C. competed in the Football League Second Division.

== Season summary ==
In the 1988–89 season, Leicester failed to put consecutive wins in the league for the first time since the 1977–78 relegation season from the top flight. The only highlight in the league for the Foxes was a 2–0 win over champions Chelsea, which delayed their promotion celebrations and also ending their 27-match unbeaten run. Leicester's 15th-place finish meant the Foxes finished in the bottom half of the Second Division for a second consecutive season, which they had not done since 1951.

== Final league table ==
Pos	Team	Pld	W	D	L	GF	GA	GD	Pts
13	Stoke City	46	15	14	17	57	72	−15	59
14	Bradford City	46	13	17	16	52	59	−7	56
15	Leicester City	46	13	16	17	56	63	−7	55
16	Oldham Athletic	46	11	21	14	75	72	+3	54
17	Oxford United	46	14	12	20	62	70	−8	54

Source: thestatcat.co.uk
Rules for classification: 1) Points; 2) Goal difference; 3) Goals scored

== Results ==
Leicester City's score comes first

=== Legend ===
Win	Draw	Loss

=== Football League Second Division ===
Date	Opponent	Venue	Result	Attendance	Scorers
27 August 1988	West Bromwich Albion	H	1–1	13,082	Mauchlen
29 August 1988	Portsmouth	A	0–3	10,737	
3 September 1988	Birmingham City	A	3–2	7,932	Newell, Cross, Quinn
10 September 1988	Ipswich Town	H	0–1	10,816	
17 September 1988	Oxford United	A	1–1	6,610	Cross
21 September 1988	Plymouth Argyle	H	1–0	9,117	Newell
24 September 1988	Watford	H	2–2	10,957	Walsh, Reid
1 October 1988	Chelsea	A	1–2	7,050	Quinn
4 October 1988	Hull City	A	2–2	5,079	McAllister, Williams
8 October 1988	Brighton & Hove Albion	H	1–0	9,021	Quinn
15 October 1988	Stoke City	H	2–0	10,312	Newell (2)
22 October 1988	Leeds United	A	1–1	17,263	Quinn
26 October 1988	Swindon Town	H	3–3	9,751	McAllister (2, 1 pen), King (own goal)
29 October 1988	Shrewsbury Town	A	0–3	5,178	
5 November 1988	Manchester City	H	0–0	14,080	
12 November 1988	Walsall	A	1–0	6,895	Newell
19 November 1988	Crystal Palace	A	2–4	8,843	Newell, McAllister
26 November 1988	Bradford City	H	1–0	9,533	Quinn
3 December 1988	Oldham Athletic	A	1–1	5,789	Quinn
10 December 1988	Sunderland	H	3–1	11,093	Newell, Cross, Reid
17 December 1988	Barnsley	A	0–3	6,477	
26 December 1988	Bournemouth	H	0–1	13,896	
31 December 1988	Blackburn Rovers	H	4–0	10,820	Turner, Cross, Newell, McAllister
2 January 1989	Ipswich Town	A	0–2	14,037	
14 January 1989	Portsmouth	H	2–1	10,567	Turner, Reid
21 January 1989	West Bromwich Albion	A	1–1	20,785	Reid
4 February 1989	Hull City	H	0–2	9,996	
11 February 1989	Brighton & Hove Albion	A	1–1	9,572	McAllister
18 February 1989	Leeds United	H	1–2	14,151	Cross
25 February 1989	Stoke City	A	2–2	9,666	Reid, Walsh
28 February 1989	Swindon Town	A	1–2	7,456	Newell
4 March 1989	Walsall	H	1–0	9,375	Cross
11 March 1989	Manchester City	A	2–4	22,266	McAllister, Newell
15 March 1989	Shrewsbury Town	H	1–1	7,750	McAllister
18 March 1989	Plymouth Argyle	A	1–1	6,703	Cross
25 March 1989	Birmingham City	H	2–0	9,564	Mauchlen (2)
27 March 1989	Bournemouth	A	1–2	8,913	McAllister
1 April 1989	Oxford United	H	1–0	8,187	McAllister
8 April 1989	Blackburn Rovers	A	0–0	8,103	
11 April 1989	Barnsley	H	0–1	7,266	
15 April 1989	Chelsea	H	2–0	19,468	Reid, Cross
22 April 1989	Watford	A	1–2	11,262	Newell
29 April 1989	Bradford City	A	1–2	8,703	Paris
1 May 1989	Oldham Athletic	H	1–2	7,223	Newell
6 May 1989	Crystal Palace	H	2–2	9,917	North, Cross
13 May 1989	Sunderland	A	2–2	15,819	McAllister, Newell (pen)

=== FA Cup ===
Round	Date	Opponent	Venue	Result	Attendance	Goalscorers
R3	7 January 1989	Manchester City	A	0–1	23,838	

=== League Cup ===
Round	Date	Opponent	Venue	Result	Attendance	Goalscorers
R2 1st leg	28 September 1988	Watford	H	4–1	9,512	Reid, Walsh, Cross, McAllister (pen)
R2 2nd leg	11 October 1988	Watford	A	2–2 (won 6–3 on agg)	9,087	Mauchlen, Newell
R3	2 November 1988	Norwich City	H	2–0	14,586	Newell, Reid
R4	30 November 1988	Nottingham Forest	H	0–0	26,764	
R4R	14 December 1988	Nottingham Forest	A	1–2	26,676	Clarke

=== Full Members Cup ===
Round	Date	Opponent	Venue	Result	Attendance	Goalscorers
R1	8 November 1988	Watford	A	0–2 (a.e.t.)	3,626	

== Squad ==
Note: Flags indicate national team as defined under FIFA eligibility rules; some limited exceptions apply. Players may hold more than one non-FIFA nationality.

Pos.	Nation	Player
GK	ENG	Martin Hodge
MF	SCO	Ali Mauchlen (captain)
DF	ENG	Tony Spearing
MF	NIR	Paul Ramsey
DF	ENG	Steve Walsh
DF	ENG	Grant Brown
MF	ENG	Paul Reid
FW	ENG	Nicky Cross
FW	ENG	Mike Newell
MF	SCO	Gary McAllister
MF	ENG	Phil Turner
FW	NIR	Jimmy Quinn
GK	ENG	Paul Cooper
DF	ENG	Alan Paris

Pos.	Nation	Player
MF	SCO	Peter Weir
GK	ENG	Carl Muggleton
DF	ENG	Simon Morgan
MF	IRL	Martin Russell
MF	ENG	Darren Williams
MF	ENG	Paul Groves
DF	IRL	Tony Brien
MF	ENG	Gary Mills
MF	IRL	Mick Kennedy
DF	ENG	Gary Charles (on loan from Nottingham Forest)
FW	ENG	Marc North
DF	IRL	Peter Eccles
MF	ENG	Dave Puttnam
FW	ENG	Steve Wilkinson
