= Gary Coatsworth =

English footballer (born 1968)

Personal information
- Full name: Gary Coatsworth
- Date of birth: 7 October 1968 (age 58)
- Place of birth: Sunderland, England
- Height: 6 ft 1 in (1.85 m)
- Position: Defender

Youth career
- 1986–1987: Barnsley

Senior career*
Years	Team	Apps	(Gls)
1987–1989	Barnsley	6	(0)
1989–1991	Darlington	25	(3)
1991–1995	Leicester City	32	(4)
1995–199?	Spennymoor United		
199?–200?	Washington Nissan		
- * Club domestic league appearances and goals

Gary Coatsworth (born 7 October 1968) is an English former footballer who made 60 appearances in the Football League playing as a defender for Barnsley, Darlington, and Leicester City. He scored the goal that confirmed Darlington as winners of the 1989–90 Football Conference title, and played in Leicester City's 1994 Football League First Division play-off final victory over Derby County. Injury forced his retirement from professional football in 1995 at the age of 26, though he was able to continue for some years in non-league football.

== Early and personal life ==
Gary Coatsworth was born on 7 October 1968 in Sunderland. After leaving school, he worked as a panel beater and played youth football locally. Two of his team-mates at Sunday league team Moorside, Lee Howey and Clive Mendonca, also went on to play professional football. In 1986, a trial with Football League Second Division club Barnsley proved successful, and he accepted the offer of a contract.

== League football ==
=== Barnsley ===
Coatsworth made his Football League debut on 19 December 1987 at home to Millwall. His team were 2–0 up when his "sloppy pass-back" allowed the visitors' Teddy Sheringham to score, but Barnsley went on to win 4–1. He did not return to the first team until the last few matches of the season, when he made three appearances as a substitute and two starts, but he played only reserve-team football in 1988–89 and was released at the end of the season.

=== Darlington ===
Coatsworth signed for Darlington, newly relegated to the Conference but managed by the ambitious Brian Little. Initially unable to displace Les McJannet from the right-back position, Coatsworth finally made his debut in November 1989; he broke a collarbone and was out for six weeks. By the last match of the season, away to Welling United, Darlington needed a draw to ensure promotion back to the Football League, whatever result was achieved by rivals Barnet. They had injury problems in defence, so Coatsworth came into the side and, with four minutes left and the match still goalless, he met a free kick with a header that looped over the goalkeeper and secured a 1–0 win. At a 2003 event held to mark the club's leaving their long-time home, Feethams, the award for the club's most important goal went to Coatsworth, for "the winner at Welling that took Quakers back into the Football League".

He began the new Fourth Division season as a reserve, starting twice in October when both McJannet and David Corner were unavailable and a further twice in similar circumstances in December; he scored his first Football League goal on 1 December with a powerful header in a 3–1 defeat away to Stockport County. The last of his 12 league appearances was in the final match of the campaign, from which Darlington needed and achieved a win against Rochdale to secure a second successive title. Little left for Leicester City in May 1991 and, after finally becoming a regular in Darlington's starting eleven, Coatsworth followed him to the Second Division club in October for a £15,000 fee.

=== Leicester City ===
He made his first league start on 30 November in a 2–1 win away to Derby County, and performed well enough to keep his place for the next match, during which he was substituted with what was reported as a jarred knee. Minor surgery and specialist rehabilitation failed to fix the problem, and a second operation – nearly three months after the original injury – confirmed a ruptured cruciate ligament. It was another year before he returned to the first team, but his return marked the start of a winning run that included his first goals for Leicester – a header and a "superb angled drive" with three minutes left to complete a 3–2 win away to his former club, Barnsley – and pushed the team into the play-off positions for a second year. Also for a second year, Coatsworth was unfit for the play-off final, having put a premature end to his season by playing on an already injured ankle.

He signed a two-year contract in July 1993, injured a hamstring in pre-season, and his only appearance in the first few months of the new season was as a substitute in the Anglo-Italian Cup in September. He came into the side in December, and for the first time in his Leicester career, was able to retain a regular place. His 25-yard (23 m) volley opened the scoring in a 2–1 defeat of Luton Town that helped Leicester reach the play-offs for a third consecutive year and, according to the club's website in 2020, "remains a point in time for Foxes supporters". He scored again in the last regular-season match, a draw with Wolverhampton Wanderers, and according to the Leicester Mercury was the most influential player on the field. In the final, opponents Derby County took the lead "when, with four minutes left before the break, Gary Coatsworth inelegantly thumped a high ball into the middle it soon became the sweetest pass hit by a City player this season." The referee missed Iwan Roberts' foul on Derby's goalkeeper, while the covering defender missed Steve Walsh's weak header on the goal-line and the scores were tied. Walsh scored again late in the game, and Leicester were promoted to the Premier League.

Coatsworth was not included among the players named by Little as those he expected to use in the opening weeks of the 1994–95 Premier League season. He continued for a few months in the reserves, until, in February 1995, he confirmed his retirement from professional football. Because of the club's injury problems at the end of the previous season, Coatsworth had played on despite a cyst that caused severe swelling in his ankle after a game. Removal did not fix the problem, and a surgeon told him that he had arthritis which would lead to serious mobility issues in later life if he continued to play professional football.

== Later life and career ==
Coatsworth returned to his native Sunderland, where he took a job at the Nissan car plant. Before the end of the season, he was playing for Spennymoor United of the Northern Premier League Premier Division; he later played for Washington Nissan in the Wearside League, helping them win the title in 2001, and in the Northern League. He eventually gave up the game because it was incompatible with his paid work. He was still working at Nissan in 2020, employed as a supervisor.

== Career statistics ==
Appearances and goals by club, season and competition
Club	Season	League			FA Cup		League Cup		Other		Total	
Club	Season	Division	Apps	Goals	Apps	Goals	Apps	Goals	Apps	Goals	Apps	Goals
Barnsley	1987–88	Second Division	6	0	0	0	0	0	0	0	6	0
Barnsley	1988–89	Second Division	0	0	0	0	0	0	0	0	0	0
Barnsley	Total		6	0	0	0	0	0	0	0	6	0
Darlington	1989–90	Football Conference	3	1	0	0	—		2 (Note: One appearance in FA Trophy, one in Conference League Cup)	0	5	1
Darlington	1990–91	Fourth Division	12	1	0	0	1	0	2 (Note: Appearance(s) in Associate Members' Cup)	0	15	1
Darlington	1991–92	Third Division	10	1	0	0	1	0	1	0	12	1
Total		25	3	0	0	2	0	5	0	32	3	
Leicester City	1991–92	Second Division	3	0	0	0	—		1 (Note: Appearance in Full Members' Cup)	0	4	0
Leicester City	1992–93	First Division	10	2	0	0	0	0	0	0	10	2
Leicester City	1993–94	First Division	19	2	1	0	0	0	4 (Note: One appearance in Anglo-Italian Cup, three in First Division play-offs)	0	24	2
Leicester City	1994–95	Premiership	0	0	0	0	0	0	—		0	0
Leicester City	Total		32	4	1	0	0	0	5	0	38	4
Career total			63	7	1	0	2	0	10	0	76	7

== Honours ==
Darlington

- Football League Fourth Division: 1990–91
- Football Conference: 1989–90

Leicester City

- Football League First Division play-offs: 1994

Washington Nissan

- Wearside League: 2000–01

== Sources ==
- Rollin, Jack, ed. (1990). Rothmans Football Yearbook 1990–91. London: Queen Anne Press. ISBN 0-356-17911-7.
- Tweddle, Frank (2000). The Definitive Darlington F.C. Nottingham: SoccerData. ISBN 978-1-899468-15-7.
