= Gary Mills (footballer, born 1961) =

English association football player and manager

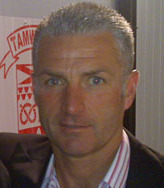
- Mills in 2009

Personal information
- Full name: Gary Roland Mills
- Date of birth: 11 November 1961 (age 64)
- Place of birth: Northampton, England
- Height: 5 ft 9 in (1.75 m)
- Positions: Right-back; midfielder

Youth career
- –1978: Nottingham Forest

Senior career*
Years	Team	Apps	(Gls)
1978–1982	Nottingham Forest	58	(8)
1982–1983	Seattle Sounders	34	(5)
1982–1983	→ Derby County (loan)	18	(2)
1983–1987	Nottingham Forest	79	(4)
1987–1989	Notts County	75	(8)
1989–1994	Leicester City	200	(15)
1994–1996	Notts County	47	(0)
1996–1998	Grantham Town	66	(3)
1998	Gresley Rovers	7	(0)
1998–2000	King's Lynn	67	(3)
2000–2001	Boston United	8	(0)
2001–2002	Tamworth	41	(2)
2005	Glapwell		
2005–2007	Alfreton Town	24	(0)
2007–2010	Tamworth	3	(0)
Total		727	(50)

International career
1977	England Schoolboys	9	(2)
1978–1979	England U18	2	(0)
1981	England U21	2	(0)

Managerial career
- 1996–1998: Grantham Town
- 1998–2000: King's Lynn
- 2001–2002: Tamworth
- 2004: Notts County
- 2005–2007: Alfreton Town
- 2007–2010: Tamworth
- 2010–2013: York City
- 2013–2015: Gateshead
- 2015–2016: Wrexham
- 2016–2017: York City
- 2020–2022: Corby Town
- * Club domestic league appearances and goals

Gary Roland Mills (born 11 November 1961) is an English football manager and former professional player. He played in the Premier League and Football League for Nottingham Forest, Derby County, Notts County and Leicester City and managed in the Football League with Notts County and York City. He was recently the manager of Northern Premier League Division One Midlands club Corby Town.

Mills, who played as a right-back and as a midfielder, started his career with First Division club Nottingham Forest. He became the club's youngest league player after making his first-team debut at the age of 16 in 1978. He played in the victorious 1980 European Cup Final, which made him the youngest finalist in European Cup history. He joined the Seattle Sounders of the North American Soccer League in 1982 and played for them for one season, which culminated in a loss to the New York Cosmos in Soccer Bowl '82. While with them Mills had a loan at Derby County, making 23 appearances for the Second Division club. He returned to Forest in 1983, and made 168 appearances over two spells at the club. He left for their rivals, Notts County of the Third Division, in 1987. Mills then joined Leicester City in 1989, and after two unsuccessful forays into the First Division play-offs he helped them win promotion to the Premier League in 1994. He soon returned to County, by this time playing in the First Division, after 232 appearances for Leicester. Here Mills earned the last honour of his playing career, winning the Anglo-Italian Cup in 1995. He retired from professional football in 1996 due to an injury, having made 159 appearances for County over two spells.

Mills started his managerial career as player-manager with Grantham Town in 1996. He left the club after leading them to the Southern League Midland Division title in his second season. He then served as player-manager at Southern League Premier Division club King's Lynn from 1998 to 2000, which was brought to an end after he resigned. He was appointed player-manager of Southern League Premier Division club Tamworth in 2001, before leaving to join the coaching staff at Coventry City in 2002. Mills was handed his first managerial role in the Football League with Notts County in 2004, but was dismissed several months after the club was relegated to League Two. He managed Alfreton Town of the Conference North from 2005 to 2007 when he returned to Tamworth. The club was relegated from the Conference National before Mills led them to the Conference North title in 2009. He left Tamworth in 2010 to become manager of their Conference Premier rivals York City. Mills oversaw York's victories in the FA Trophy and Conference Premier play-offs in 2012, the latter resulting in promotion to League Two. He was dismissed by York in 2013 before taking over at Gateshead, and after leading them to the Conference Premier play-offs in 2014 he was named the Non-League Manager of the Year. Mills took over as manager of their National League rivals Wrexham in 2015, but was dismissed the following year.

== Early and personal life ==
Mills was born in Northampton, Northamptonshire to Roly, also a footballer, and Jean (née Frost). As a youngster Mills displayed talent in multiple sports, being capped for England schools in both football and rugby union, and showed promise as a sprinter, running 100 metres in 11 seconds as an English Schools' Athletics Championships finalist.

== Club career ==
=== Nottingham Forest ===
Mills played for a local village team before being spotted by a Nottingham Forest scout at the age of 11. Aged 14 he broke into Forest's reserve team, which played in the Central League. Mills also played for Long Buckby's youth team, and was part of the team that won a national under-16 competition. He started his senior career at Forest under the management of Brian Clough, making his first-team debut in a 2–1 victory at home to Arsenal in the First Division on 9 September 1978, and in doing so became Forest's youngest league player at the age of 16 years and 203 days. Mills signed a professional contract with Forest on 13 November 1978, two days after his 17th birthday, after serving his apprenticeship He scored his first goal for Forest with the opening goal of a 2–1 win away to Leeds United on 15 May 1979. Despite not participating in the 1979 European Cup Final at the Olympiastadion, in which Forest beat Malmö FF 1–0, Mills became the youngest player to win the European Cup at the age of 17 years and 201 days on the virtue of having made one appearance in the competition that season. He finished the 1978–79 season, in which Forest were First Division runners-up, with six appearances and one goal.

Due to an injury to Trevor Francis he started in the 1–0 victory over Hamburger SV in the 1980 European Cup Final, staged at the Santiago Bernabéu Stadium, and being aged 18 meant he became the youngest player to appear in a European Cup final. Mills played more frequently in 1979–80, making 20 appearances and scoring 1 goal, as Forest finished fifth in the league. He played in the 2–1 home win over Valencia in the first leg of the 1980 European Super Cup, but was not selected for the second leg which the Spanish club won 1–0; this meant Valencia became the first team to win the competition on the away goals rule. Mills missed only one league match for Forest from February 1981 to the end of 1980–81, and finished the season with 34 appearances and 7 goals, with Forest placed seventh in the First Division. He appeared more sporadically in 1981–82, making 17 appearances and scoring 1 goal, not playing more than seven league matches in succession.

=== Seattle Sounders and Derby County loan ===
Mills left Forest shortly before the end of 1981–82 to join the Seattle Sounders of the North American Soccer League in March 1982. He made 31 appearances, scored 5 goals and recorded 7 assists in the 1982 North American Soccer League season as Seattle finished first in the Western Division. He started for Seattle in Soccer Bowl '82 before being substituted for Roger Davies, and the match was won 1–0 by the New York Cosmos with a 31st-minute goal scored by Giorgio Chinaglia. Less than a month later he made a temporary return to England by signing for Forest's local rivals Derby County on loan on 13 October 1982. Mills made his debut three days later in a 1–1 away draw with Grimsby Town in the Second Division, before scoring his first goal with Derby's second in a 2–0 home win over Queens Park Rangers on 3 January 1983. His loan ended in April 1983, having made 23 appearances and scored 2 goals for Derby in 1982–83. Early in the 1983 North American Soccer League season he had his leg broken by David Watson and was kept out of action for a year. However, this acted as a wake-up call for Mills, who said: "It made me work really hard and that's what made me go on and play until I was 47. I never stopped working on my fitness".

=== Return to Nottingham Forest ===
Mills returned to England on a permanent basis by rejoining his former club Nottingham Forest in December 1983. It was not until 7 April 1984 that he made his second debut for Forest, when he started the 3–1 home win over West Bromwich Albion. He played in nine matches for Forest in 1983–84, including seven outings in their last nine league fixtures, with the team finishing third in the First Division. Mills' first goal in his second spell with Forest was the winning goal in a 3–2 home victory over Manchester United on 8 December 1984. He was in and out of the starting line-up in 1984–85, ultimately making 31 appearances and scoring 5 goals. Forest ended in ninth place in the First Division this season.

Mills did not establish himself in the team in 1985–86. After a run of eight successive league starts spanning October to December 1985, he went on to make only three starts in the remainder of the season. In total he made 18 appearances, Forest finishing eighth in the First Division. He started 1986–87 only making substitute appearances, but from mid October 1986 onwards he started matches frequently. He made 38 appearances, scoring 1 goal, with Forest again ranking eighth in the First Division.

=== Notts County ===
After calling time on his Forest career, Mills was once again on the move, this time to Forest's neighbours Notts County on 14 August 1987. His debut came one day after joining, starting County's 4–4 home draw with Wigan Athletic on the opening day of the 1987–88 Third Division. He first scored for County with their opening goal in a 2–1 away win over Chester City on 3 October 1987. Mills played in all of County's matches in 1987–88, making 60 appearances and scoring 5 goals, and was named the club's Player of the Year. County reached the Southern Area final of the Associate Members' Cup, being beaten 4–1 on aggregate by Wolverhampton Wanderers. With County finishing fourth in the table they qualified for the Third Division play-offs, in which they were beaten 4–2 on aggregate by Walsall in the semi-final. He missed only three matches while a County player in 1988–89, making 36 appearances and scoring 4 goals.

=== Leicester City ===
Mills signed for Second Division club Leicester City on 2 March 1989 as part of the deal that saw Phil Turner join County for a fee of £125,000, with over two months of 1988–89 remaining. He slotted straight into the starting line-up, making his debut two days after joining in a 1–0 victory at home to Walsall. He made 13 consecutive appearances for Leicester before missing the last two matches of 1988–89, his new club finishing 15th in the Second Division. His first goal for Leicester was the only goal in a 1–0 win away to Stoke City on 25 November 1989. Other than a spell out of the team from early September to mid November 1989, Mills was a regular in the Leicester team that ranked 13th place in the Second Division in 1989–90, making 30 appearances and scoring 4 goals. He established himself as a popular player with the supporters, and was named the club's Player of the Year.

Mills made 49 appearances and scored 5 goals for Leicester in 1990–91, missing only one match all season. Leicester avoided relegation to the Third Division by only two points, finishing one place above relegated West Bromwich Albion in 22nd place. Mills went one better in 1991–92 by appearing in all 62 Leicester fixtures that season, scoring 7 goals, and was named the club's Player of the Year for the second time. This season saw an improvement in fortunes for Leicester, as they reached the Northern Area final of the Full Members' Cup, in which they were beaten 3–1 on aggregate by Nottingham Forest, and the Second Division play-offs with a fourth-place finish the league. After beating Cambridge United 6–1 on aggregate in the semi-final Leicester lost 1–0 to Blackburn Rovers at Wembley Stadium in the final.

Mills captained the Leicester team that reached the First Division play-offs in 1992–93 with a sixth place league finish, and they beat Portsmouth 3–2 on aggregate in the semi-final. However, they lost in the final for the second successive season, being beaten 4–3 by Swindon Town at Wembley Stadium. He made 53 appearances this season, missing only three of Leicester's fixtures. Mills featured regularly in 1993–94 before missing the last few months of the season with a foot injury, having made 25 appearances by then. By finishing fourth in the table Leicester made the First Division play-offs for the third successive season, and Mills led the team out before the final despite being unable to play. Leicester beat Derby County 2–1 and thus earned promotion to the Premier League.

=== Return to Notts County ===
Mills returned to Notts County on 26 September 1994 after re-signing for a fee of £50,000, having made one Premier League appearance for Leicester by that point in 1994–95. Making his debut in a 2–0 away defeat to Reading in the First Division on 1 October 1994, he played regularly at right-back before moving to left-back towards the end of 1994–95 after Craig Short returned to the team. He picked up his last playing honour this season as part of the team that won the Anglo-Italian Cup after County beat Ascoli 2–1 in the final at Wembley Stadium. However, County were relegated to the Second Division after finishing 24th in the First Division, with Mills making 43 appearances.

Mills started 1995–96 as County's first-choice right-back before losing his place to Tommy Gallagher. He returned to the starting line-up in November 1995, before his season was ended by a serious injury in December. County finished fourth in the Second Division, and after being beaten 2–0 by Bradford in the play-off final, the club released Mills after he had made 20 appearances in 1995–96. He retired from professional football in May 1996 as a result of the injury he sustained that season.

== International career ==
Mills was capped by England at schools level before making his under-18 debut in a 1–0 victory over the Soviet Union on 10 October 1978. He won his second and last cap in a 4–0 victory over Belgium on 17 January 1979. Mills' debut for the under-21 team came in a 3–0 victory over Romania in a 1982 UEFA European Under-21 Championship qualifier on 28 April 1981. He was capped again in a 0–0 with draw Norway in a friendly on 8 September 1981.

== Style of play ==
Mills played primarily as a right-back or as a midfielder. He was comfortable on the ball, could play the passing game and was a good tackler.

== Managerial and coaching career ==
=== Grantham Town ===
Mills moved into management on the advice of John Barnwell when being appointed the player-manager of Grantham Town in July 1996. Darron Gee joined him as his assistant, and the two went on to frequently work together as a management team. Mills' managerial and playing debut for Grantham was in a 3–0 home defeat to Grimsby Town in the quarter-final of the Lincolnshire Senior Cup on 13 August 1996, and he scored his first goal for them in a 3–2 win home over Evesham United on 21 September. He led the team to fourth place in the Southern League Midland Division in 1996–97, missing out on second place and thus promotion by one point. He played regularly this season, making 46 appearances and scoring 3 goals.

In 1997–98, Mills' Grantham won the Southern League Midland Division title, earning promotion to the Southern League Premier Division, having led the table from the start of the season. Grantham also reached the quarter-final of the FA Trophy for only the second time in the club's history. He appeared even more frequently in the first team this season, making 50 appearances. However, Mills resigned a week after the season ended in May 1998 as the club's takeover by local businessman Reg Brealey would have meant dismantling the team due to budget cuts. He joined Gresley Rovers of the Southern League Premier Division as a player in July 1998, making his debut in their 0–0 away draw with Bromsgrove Rovers on 22 August. He appeared regularly for Gresley, playing in their first seven matches of 1998–99.

=== King's Lynn ===
Mills took over as player-manager at King's Lynn in September 1998 and was sent off on his playing debut, a 3–2 away defeat to Worcester City in the Southern League Premier Division on 26 September. His first goal for the club came after shooting into the bottom corner from a Lee Wilson back-heel in a 3–3 home draw with Salisbury City on 6 March 1999. He made 30 appearances and scored 1 goal in 1998–99, as his team finished 10th in the Southern League Premier Division. King's Lynn improved on their league performance in 1999–2000, finishing in fifth place in the table. Mills continued to appear frequently in the team, playing in 34 matches and scoring 1 goal. He resigned as King's Lynn manager on 8 November 2000 due to major financial problems at the club, and had made 16 appearances and scored one 1 up to that point in 2000–01. He returned to playing just three days later by signing for Football Conference club Boston United, making his debut the same day in a 2–2 home draw with Scarborough.

=== Tamworth ===
Mills made eight appearances for Boston before being appointed the player-manager of Southern League Premier Division club Tamworth on 12 January 2001. He was not in charge for the following day's 3–0 home defeat to Boston in the FA Trophy, with Tim Steele continuing as caretaker manager for this match. His first match as manager was a 2–2 home draw with Havant & Waterlooville on 20 January 2001, in which he played and scored. Tamworth finished the season in 12th place in the Southern League Premier Division, and Mills made 16 appearances and scored 2 goals. Tamworth missed out on promotion to the Football Conference on the final day of 2001–02, finishing second in the Southern League Premier Division, two points behind the title winners Kettering Town. He played often for Tamworth this season, making 30 appearances.

=== Coventry City ===
Mills left the club on 23 May 2002 to become first-team coach and reserve-team manager at First Division club Coventry City, as part of the management team of Gary McAllister and Eric Black. In 2002–03, Mills' reserves finished bottom of the Premier Reserve League Southern Division in 14th place. He spoke to Telford United regarding the managerial vacancy at the Football Conference club in May 2003, but decided to stay at Coventry saying he was happy at the club. Mills later spoke of his regret at leaving Tamworth for Coventry, saying: "It was the biggest decision I've ever made in football. I was very happy at Tamworth and we were winning most games".

=== Notts County ===
Mills took over as manager of Second Division Notts County on 9 January 2004 after the resignation of Bill Dearden, with the club lying 23rd in the Second Division table. His first match in charge came just a day later, in which Marc Goodfellow scored a stoppage time winner for Bristol City as County were beaten 2–1 at home. After a run of good form from late February to early March 2004 County rose out of the relegation zone, but a run of one victory from the last 12 matches of 2003–04 saw the club relegated to League Two in 23rd place. Despite having a healthier playing budget and a reorganisation of the squad during the summer of 2004, County made a disappointing start to 2004–05. As a result, Mills was dismissed on 4 November 2004 with the club 21st in League Two, and he declined the offer of a lesser position with the club. He resumed his playing career during early 2005 with Northern Counties East League Premier Division club Glapwell, playing under Lee Wilson, who Mills had previously played with and managed.

=== Alfreton Town ===
He was appointed as manager of Conference North club Alfreton Town on 25 May 2005 on a three-year contract, becoming the first full-time manager in the club's history. Alfreton went into 2005–06 with a reduced playing budget and Mills was able to keep the club on an even keel. His first match as Alfreton manager was a 2–1 home defeat to Vauxhall Motors on 13 August 2005, and having flirted with relegation the team finished the season in 17th place in the Conference North. Mills was registered as a player in 2005–06, and made 21 appearances after his debut came in a 2–1 home win over Redditch United on 10 September 2005.

Mills made large-scale changes to the squad over the summer of 2006, although a few months into 2006–07 more budget cuts were made and this limited his ability to add to a squad lacking in depth. When he left Alfreton they were 13th in the Conference North, and he was playing less frequently, making five appearances in 2006–07.

=== Return to Tamworth ===
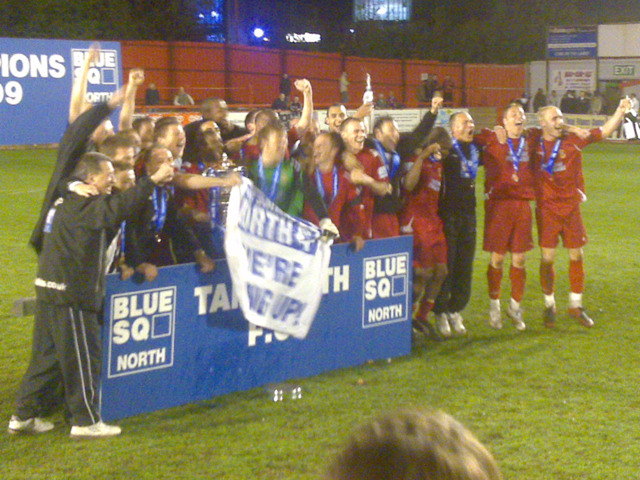
Mills (third from right) and his Tamworth team celebrate winning the Conference North title in the 2008–09 season

After an undisclosed financial settlement was agreed Mills left Alfreton to return to Tamworth, who at this time were in the Conference National, for a second spell as manager on 26 January 2007. He joined with the team 24th in the table and following his appointment he said: "It feels fantastic to be back. It is an amazing football club that means a lot to me". He was in charge for the home match against Crawley Town the day after his appointment, the visitors winning 1–0 with a 54th-minute goal scored by Mark Wright . Mills was unable to keep Tamworth up, the club being relegated to the Conference North with a 22nd-place finish in the Conference National. He stated his determination to get the club back up, saying: "The disappointment will go away because this is a great football club to be at. We all need to stay proud and positive and I will now prepare a squad for the start of next season." Tamworth spent most of 2007–08 in midtable, eventually finishing 15th in the Conference North; the Tamworth Herald claimed it was "among the poorest campaigns in the club's history".

Mills was given time to rebuild the squad over the summer of 2008, bringing in players like Bradley Pritchard, Alex Rodman, Chris Smith, Tom Shaw and Michael Wylde. He was named the Conference North Manager of the Month for September 2008, in which Tamworth achieved three straight league wins following a draw away to in-form Alfreton. He won the award again for March 2009 after Tamworth were top of the table with five wins and two draws, including a 1–0 victory away to title rivals Southport. Mills led Tamworth to promotion back to the Conference Premier after winning the Conference North title in 2008–09 and this was confirmed with a 1–0 victory over local rivals Hinckley United on 21 April 2009. The final match of the season, a 0–0 draw away to AFC Telford United, saw Mills come out of retirement after he came on as a 90th-minute substitute for Rodman. He was given a standing ovation from the travelling supporters in the process. After the end of the season he was named the Conference North Manager of the Year.

Tamworth started 2009–10 in good form, and by late September 2009 were occupying a play-off spot in the Conference Premier. Mills' team eventually finished in 16th place in a season of consolidation; this represented the second highest league placing in the club's history. He made the last appearance of his career aged 48 after starting Tamworth's 4–3 home defeat to Ebbsfleet United on 24 April 2010, before substituting himself for Des Lyttle in the 55th minute. This was his third appearance of the season. In the Conference Premier, Tamworth were playing against a number of clubs with Football League pedigrees, meaning they were not able to offer contracts as lucrative or long as many clubs. Mills complemented the competitiveness of his team in this division, saying: "For a small club like us, it's great to be mixing with these teams. But, while we may be smaller, like last year, we will make sure that we are capable of getting results." Tamworth had a strong start in 2010–11; they were again in a play-off position by late September 2010, and by the time Mills had left the club they were 12th in the Conference Premier.

=== York City ===
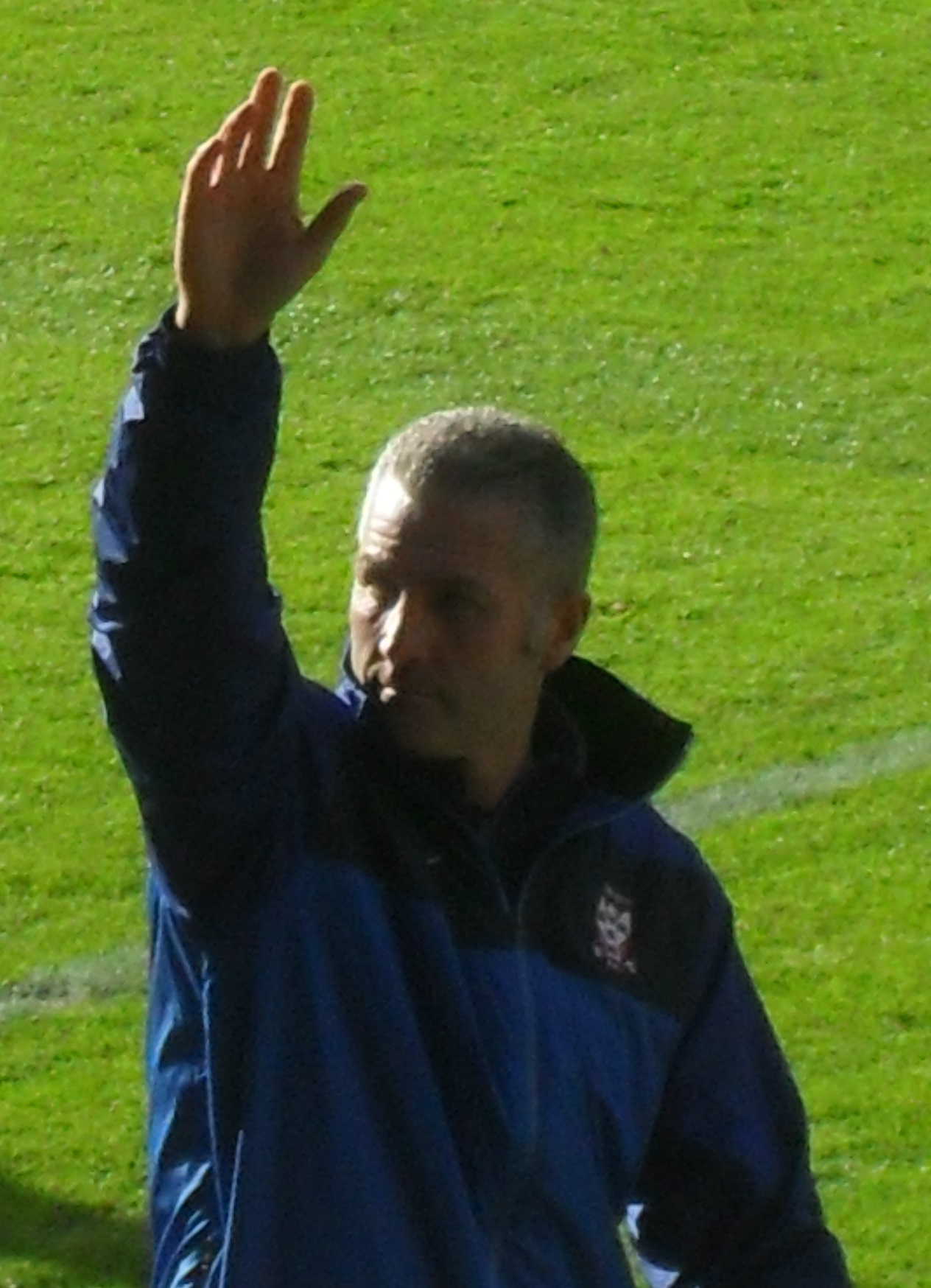
Mills before his first match in charge as York City manager in 2010

With a compensation package agreed Mills left Tamworth after being appointed the manager of fellow Conference Premier club York City on 13 October 2010. He replaced Martin Foyle, who resigned the previous month, and at the time of his appointment York were 16th in the table. He was not registered as a player at York, although chairman Jason McGill would refuse Mills a playing contract on multiple occasions. After his appointment, Mills said he believed he had left Tamworth for a club with greater potential and that his aim was to return York to the Football League.

Mills' first match in charge was a 1–1 draw at home to Bath City on 16 October 2010, and with results improving he was named the Conference Premier Manager of the Month for November 2010 after York recorded four wins and three draws, including a 3–0 home win over Rotherham United in the first round of the FA Cup. In the third round of the competition Mills' York played Premier League team Bolton Wanderers, who won 2–0 with late goals from Kevin Davies and Johan Elmander. York made a push toward the play-off places, and by mid March 2011 were sixth in the Conference Premier, just one place outside the play-offs. York finished 2010–11 in eighth place in the Conference Premier, The Press claiming Mills "restored pride and belief into the club" with his "unbounded optimism and positivity".

Mills made a statement of intent to win the Conference Premier title in 2011–12. His summer recruitment was focused on signing players who would improve the team's goalscoring record, and he succeeding in doing this when signing Matty Blair, Paddy McLaughlin and Jason Walker. York consistently occupied a play-off position throughout 2011–12, eventually securing one after finishing fourth in the table. The team played a passing style in the first half of the season, before often grinding out results with The Press saying they "compensated for a loss of craft with bundles of graft".

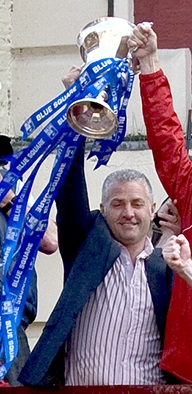
Mills with the victory parade that followed York City's victory in the 2012 Conference Premier play-off final

After beating Mansfield Town 2–1 on aggregate in the play-off semi-final, York were 2–0 victors over Newport County at Wembley Stadium in the 2012 FA Trophy Final; this was the first time the club had won a national knockout competition in its 90-year history. Eight days later Mills took his York team back to Wembley Stadium for the 2012 Conference Premier play-off final, and following a 2–1 victory over Luton Town with goals from Ashley Chambers and Blair, York were promoted to League Two, ending an eight-year absence from the Football League. This was the first time any club had won the FA Trophy and the Conference Premier play-offs in one season. This on-field achievement, combined with the approval for a community stadium to be built for the club, led to The Press lauding "an unsurpassed nine days in the Minstermen's proud existence".

Mills' signings for 2012–13 proved to be less influential than his signings the previous summer, a number of new players being left out of the team with little playing time. York were in midtable for most of the first half of the season, and his signings in the winter transfer window had little impact on the team. Having been 14th in the table on 1 January 2013, York went on a run of 11 matches without a win, and this left the team four points above the relegation zone in 18th place. Mills was dismissed by York on 2 March 2013, an hour after the last of these matches, a 2–0 defeat at home to Bradford City.

=== Gateshead ===
Mills returned to management with Conference Premier club Gateshead, signing a one-year rolling contract on 3 September 2013 to replace Anth Smith who resigned in August. At the time Gateshead were 19th in the table, one point above the relegation zone. His first match was a 2–1 home win over Hereford United on 7 September 2013, and both goals were scored by Josh Walker. This was the first time Mills had won his opening match as manager at a new club. Mills was named the Conference Premier Manager of the Month for October 2013 after Gateshead won all five matches that month, conceding only one goal. Gateshead's form continued to improve and by mid January 2014 they had moved into a play-off place; Mills commented in February that "When I came in, I wanted everyone here to believe that we could win promotion – I think they're starting to now".

Gateshead qualified for the Conference Premier play-offs for the first time in their history after finishing third in the table in 2013–14, which represented the club's highest league placing since being voted out of the Football League in 1960. With a 4–2 aggregate win over Grimsby Town in the semi-final, Gateshead played at Wembley Stadium for the first time in the play-off final; despite entering the match on the back of a 14-match unbeaten run they were beaten 2–1 by Cambridge United. Mills said after the match that "I told the lads that they'll be better for it. My job next year is to emulate or better this season". He was named the Non-League Manager of the Year for 2013–14 at the National Game Awards, ahead of John Still, who led Luton to the Conference Premier title.

=== Wrexham ===
Mills was appointed manager of Gateshead's National League rivals Wrexham on 28 April 2015 on a one-year rolling contract. On 13 October 2016, Mills was dismissed by Wrexham, after a run of four defeats from six matches left them 15th in the table.

=== Return to York City ===
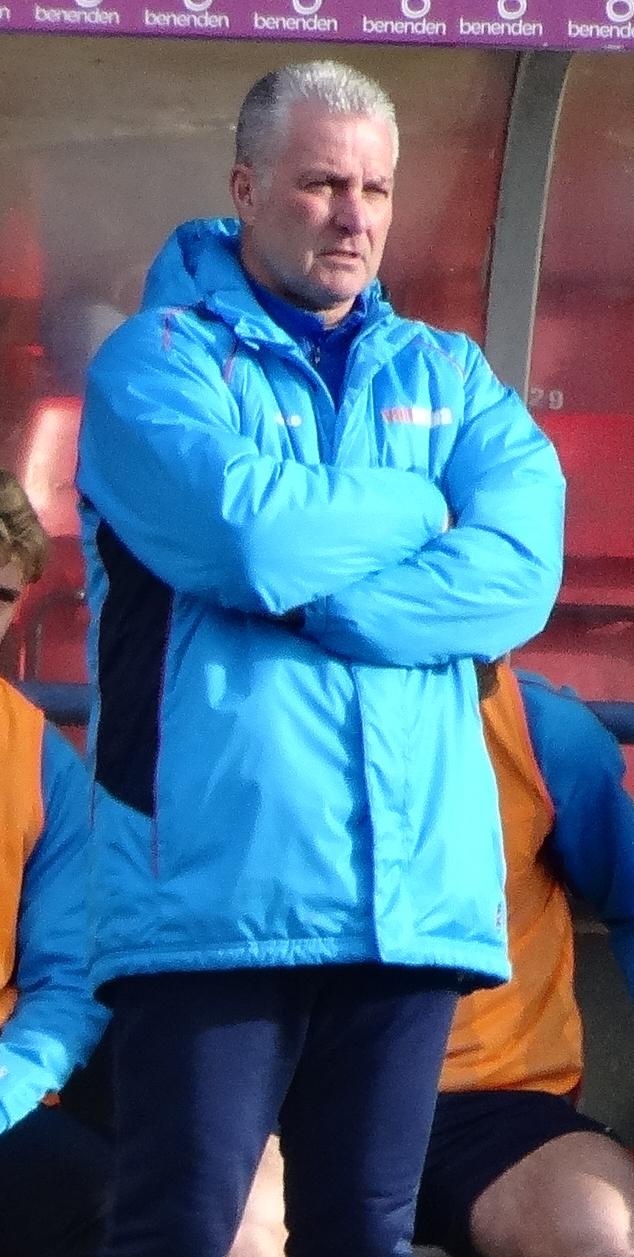
Mills as manager of York City in 2017

On 16 October 2016, Mills was reappointed as manager of York City, with the team 19th in the National League. He succeeded Jackie McNamara, who remained at the club as chief executive. Mills was unable to keep York City in the National League and they were Relegated to the National League North on 29 April 2017 after a 2–2 draw with Forest Green Rovers. However, on 21 May 2017, Mills' York beat Macclesfield Town 3–2 at Wembley Stadium in the 2017 FA Trophy Final. Mills was dismissed by York on 30 September 2017, on the same day as a defeat to South Shields in the FA Cup third qualifying round. A club statement read that "the current league position is unacceptable", with York seventh in the National League North and 11 points away from the only automatic promotion place.

=== Corby Town ===
Mills was appointed manager of Southern League Division One Central club Corby Town on 8 August 2020. The "Steelmen" parted company with Mills immediately after their 2-0 defeat to Belper Town on the final day of the Northern Premier League Midlands season, having finished 15th.

== Style of management ==
Mills' management style was influenced by a number of managers he played under, including John Barnwell, Brian Clough, Alan Hinton, Howard Kendall, Brian Little, David Pleat, Russell Slade and Neil Warnock. He learned simplicity from Clough, saying: "He never did complicate anything. Football is a simple game and Cloughie was no coach, he didn't confuse us with sessions straight out of the manual". Like Clough, Mills has been praised for his man management skills and Daren Fulford, his reserve-team manager at Tamworth, said: "If he felt you had made a mistake, he would give you a rollicking but if he was pleased with you he would always give kind words". Fulford also commented on Mills' thoroughness, saying he wanted information on each players' performances after the reserves played.

Mills sets his teams out to play a passing game, and affirmed this when stating: "My philosophy is to play football with the ball on the deck, to play attacking football, to be disciplined with and without the ball". He prefers to employ a 4–3–3 formation, explaining it allows his teams to play entertaining football and makes them hard to beat, and it brought him success when at Tamworth and York. He has stuck with this formation despite charges from some of being tactically stubborn, saying: "I'm not going to change the way my teams play, the systems. I've not even had a thought about that".

== Personal life ==
Mills is married to Sue. He released an autobiography, Young Millsy, in September 2021.

== Career statistics ==
Appearances and goals by club, season and competition
Club	Season	League			FA Cup		League Cup		Europe		Other		Total	
Club	Season	Division	Apps	Goals	Apps	Goals	Apps	Goals	Apps	Goals	Apps	Goals	Apps	Goals
Nottingham Forest	1978–79	First Division	4	1	0	0	1	0	1 (Note: Appearance(s) in European Cup)	0	0	0	6	1
Nottingham Forest	1979–80	First Division	13	1	0	0	3	0	4	0	—		20	1
Nottingham Forest	1980–81	First Division	27	5	3	0	3	2	1 (Note: Appearance in European Super Cup)	0	—		34	7
Nottingham Forest	1981–82	First Division	14	1	0	0	3	0	—		—		17	1
Nottingham Forest	Total		58	8	3	0	10	2	6	0	0	0	77	10
Seattle Sounders	1982	North American Soccer League	31	5	—		—		—		—		31	5
Seattle Sounders	1983	North American Soccer League	3	0	—		—		—		—		3	0
Seattle Sounders	Total		34	5	—		—		—		—		34	5
Derby County (loan)	1982–83	Second Division	18	2	3	0	2	0	—		—		23	2
Nottingham Forest	1983–84	First Division	7	0	0	0	—		2 (Note: Appearances in UEFA Cup)	0	—		9	0
Nottingham Forest	1984–85	First Division	26	4	0	0	3	0	2	0	—		31	4
Nottingham Forest	1985–86	First Division	14	0	1	0	3	0	—		—		18	0
Nottingham Forest	1986–87	First Division	32	0	1	0	5	1	—		—		38	1
Nottingham Forest	Total		79	4	2	0	11	1	4	0	—		96	5
Notts County	1987–88	Third Division	46	5	3	0	2	0	—		9 (Note: Seven appearances in Associate Members' Cup, two in Third Division play-offs)	0	60	5
Notts County	1988–89	Third Division	29	3	2	0	4	1	—		1 (Note: Appearance in Associate Members' Cup)	0	36	4
Notts County	Total		75	8	5	0	6	1	—		10	0	96	9
Leicester City	1988–89	Second Division	13	0	—		—		—		—		13	0
Leicester City	1989–90	Second Division	29	4	1	0	0	0	—		0	0	30	4
Leicester City	1990–91	Second Division	45	5	1	0	2	0	—		1 (Note: Appearance in Full Members' Cup)	0	49	5
Leicester City	1991–92	Second Division	46	6	2	0	4	1	—		9 (Note: Six appearances in Full Members' Cup, three in Second Division play-offs)	0	61	7
Leicester City	1992–93	First Division	43	0	2	0	3	0	—		5 (Note: Two appearances in Anglo-Italian Cup, three in First Division play-offs)	0	53	0
Leicester City	1993–94	First Division	23	0	1	0	1	0	—		0	0	25	0
Leicester City	1994–95	Premier League	1	0	—		0	0	—		—		1	0
Leicester City	Total		200	15	7	0	10	1	—		15	0	232	16
Notts County	1994–95	First Division	34	0	2	0	3	0	—		4 (Note: Appearances in Anglo-Italian Cup)	0	43	0
Notts County	1995–96	Second Division	13	0	2	0	2	0	—		3 (Note: Appearances in Football League Trophy)	0	20	0
Notts County	Total		47	0	4	0	5	0	—		7	0	63	0
Grantham Town	1996–97	Southern League Midland Division	32	3	4	0	—		—		10 (Note: One appearance in Lincolnshire Senior Cup, eight in FA Trophy, one in Southern League Cup)	0	46	3
Grantham Town	1997–98	Southern League Midland Division	34	0	2	0	—		—		14 (Note: Two appearances in Lincolnshire Senior Cup, four in Southern League Cup, eight in FA Trophy)	0	50	0
Grantham Town	Total		66	3	6	0	—		—		24	0	96	3
Gresley Rovers	1998–99	Southern League Premier Division	7	0	—		—		—		—		7	0
King's Lynn	1998–99	Southern League Premier Division	25	1	4	0	—		—		1 (Note: Appearance in FA Trophy)	0	30	1
King's Lynn	1999–2000	Southern League Premier Division	28	1	2	0	—		—		4 (Note: One appearance in FA Trophy, three in Southern League Cup)	0	34	1
King's Lynn	2000–01	Southern League Premier Division	14	1	2	0	—		—		0	0	16	1
King's Lynn	Total		67	3	8	0	—		—		5	0	80	3
Boston United	2000–01	Football Conference	8	0	—		—		—		—		8	0
Tamworth	2000–01	Southern League Premier Division	16	2	—		—		—		0	0	16	2
Tamworth	2001–02	Southern League Premier Division	25	0	5	0	—		—		0	0	30	0
Tamworth	Total		41	2	5	0	—		—		0	0	46	2
Alfreton Town	2005–06	Conference North	20	0	0	0	—		—		1	0	21	0
Alfreton Town	2006–07	Conference North	4	0	0	0	—		—		1	0	5	0
Alfreton Town	Total		24	0	0	0	—		—		2	0	26	0
Tamworth	2006–07	Conference National	0	0	—		—		—		—		0	0
Tamworth	2008–09	Conference North	1	0	0	0	—		—		0	0	1	0
Tamworth	2009–10	Conference Premier	2	0	1	0	—		—		0	0	3	0
Tamworth	2010–11	Conference Premier	0	0	—		—		—		—		0	0
Tamworth	Total		3	0	1	0	—		—		0	0	4	0
Career total			727	50	44	0	44	5	10	0	63	0	888	55

== Managerial statistics ==
As of match played 23 April 2022

Managerial record by team and tenure
Team	From	To	Record					Ref.
Team	From	To	P	W	D	L	Win %	Ref.
Grantham Town	July 1996	May 1998	111	65	17	29	58.6	
King's Lynn	September 1998	8 November 2000	106	45	30	31	42.5	
Tamworth	12 January 2001	23 May 2002	71	40	20	11	56.3	
Notts County	9 January 2004	4 November 2004	40	10	11	19	25.0	
Alfreton Town	25 May 2005	26 January 2007	76	21	27	28	27.6	
Tamworth	26 January 2007	13 October 2010	189	75	50	64	39.7	
York City	13 October 2010	2 March 2013	136	58	45	33	42.6	
Gateshead	3 September 2013	28 April 2015	103	46	32	25	44.7	
Wrexham	28 April 2015	13 October 2016	64	26	13	25	40.6	
York City	16 October 2016	30 September 2017	53	20	17	16	37.7	
Corby Town	8 August 2020	23 April 2022	53	21	8	24	39.6	
Total			1,002	427	270	305	42.6	

== Honours ==
=== As a player ===
Nottingham Forest

- European Cup: 1979–80

Notts County

- Anglo-Italian Cup: 1994–95

Individual

- Notts County Player of the Year: 1987–88
- Leicester City Player of the Year: 1989–90, 1991–92

=== As a manager ===
Grantham Town

- Southern Football League Midland Division: 1997–98

Tamworth

- Conference North: 2008–09

York City

- Conference Premier play-offs: 2012
- FA Trophy: 2011–12, 2016–17

Individual

- Conference North Manager of the Year: 2008–09
- Conference North Manager of the Month: September 2008, March 2009
- Conference Premier Manager of the Month: November 2010, October 2013
- Non-League Manager of the Year: 2013–14
