= Nicky Cross =

English footballer (born 1961)

Personal information
- Full name: Nicholas Jeremy Rowland Cross
- Date of birth: 7 February 1961 (age 65)
- Place of birth: Birmingham, England
- Height: 5 ft 9 in (1.75 m)
- Position: Forward

Youth career
- West Bromwich Albion

Senior career*
Years	Team	Apps	(Gls)
1980–1985	West Bromwich Albion	105	(15)
1985–1987	Walsall	109	(45)
1987–1989	Leicester City	58	(15)
1989–1994	Port Vale	143	(40)
1994–1996	Hereford United	65	(14)
- Solihull Borough
Total		480	(129)

Managerial career
- Redditch United
- Studley KBL
- * Club domestic league appearances and goals

Nicholas Jeremy Rowland Cross (born 7 February 1961) is an English former professional footballer who played as a forward. He scored 147 goals in 582 league and cup games in a 16-year career in the Football League, playing for five clubs.

He began his career at top-flight West Bromwich Albion in 1980 and played more than 100 games in five years before moving on to Walsall for a £48,000 fee. He also played over 100 games for Walsall, scoring 45 league goals, before being sold to Leicester City for a £80,000 fee in January 1988. He was sold to Port Vale for a £125,000 fee in June 1989. He would play a total of 175 games for the club in league and cup competitions, winning the Football League Trophy in 1993 and helping the club to promotion out of the Third Division in 1993–94. After this success, he spent two years with Hereford United before heading into non-League football with Solihull Borough in 1996. He later managed Redditch United and Studley KBL before heading into the financial sector.

== Career ==
=== West Bromwich Albion ===
Cross started his career at First Division side West Bromwich Albion in 1980, as the club finished fourth in the league under Ron Atkinson in 1980–81. The club struggled under Ronnie Allen's stewardship in 1981–82, avoiding relegation by only two points. They went on to finish in mid-table in 1982–83 under Ron Wylie before Wylie was replaced by Johnny Giles in February 1984. At the end of the 1983–84 campaign, West Brom avoided relegation by a narrow three-point margin. At the end of the 1984–85 season, Cross left The Hawthorns to sign with Walsall, who paid a £48,000 transfer fee. He had played a total of 105 league games for West Brom, scoring 15 goals.

=== Walsall ===
Dropping from the top-flight down to Alan Buckley's Third Division "Saddlers", Cross finished the 1985–86 season as the club's top-scorer with 21 goals. Walsall pushed for promotion in 1986–87 under new manager Tommy Coakley, but finished three points off the play-offs. Walsall would win promotion out of the play-offs in 1988, though Cross left the club before the end of the 1987–88 campaign. He had played 109 league games for Walsall, scoring 45 goals.

=== Leicester City ===
In January 1988, Cross signed with David Pleat's Leicester City for a £80,000 fee to provide support for Mike Newell in attack. He became a favourite of Pleat, ahead of Jimmy Quinn in the first-team pecking order. The "Foxes" posted comfortable mid-table finishes in 1987–88 and 1988–89; Cross made a total of 58 league appearances, scoring 15 goals. He played in a strike partnership with David Kelly.

=== Port Vale ===
Cross signed with Leicester's newly promoted Second Division rivals Port Vale for a £125,000 fee in June 1989. He went straight into the first-team at Vale, and played a total of 50 games in 1989–90, scoring 15 goals. His first goal for the club came against former club Leicester, in a 2–1 win at Vale Park on 7 October. He scored braces in wins against Barnsley, Plymouth Argyle, and Brighton & Hove Albion, and also netted the winner against top-flight Derby County in an FA Cup third round replay at the Baseball Ground. He played 22 games in 1990–91, scoring three goals, until he was sidelined for 14 months after he damaged his knee ligaments in December. He had agreed to sign a new contract, which was torn up by the club after he sustained the injury. He returned to action at the end of the 1991–92 campaign, playing eight games as the "Valiants" were relegated to the Third Division (which was immediately renamed the Second Division due to the creation of the Premier League).

Cross was a key first-team member again in the club's 1992–93 promotion push, scoring 12 goals in 47 games. On 24 November, he provided three assists during a 3–1 win over Potteries derby rivals Stoke City in a FA Cup replay. He scored against former club West Brom on 27 February 1993, in a 2–1 home victory. However, Vale finished third in the league, and faced the "Baggies" again in the play-off final at Wembley Stadium on 30 May; Cross was a substitute as Vale lost 3–0 after going down to ten men. Eight days earlier though, Vale had beaten Stockport County at Wembley in the final of the Football League Trophy – Cross was an unused substitute. The club went on to finish the 1993–94 campaign as Second Division runners-up, and were thus promoted; Cross contributed twelve goals to the success, half of which came in the space of three consecutive October league games against Wrexham, Hull City, and Blackpool – later in the season he scored another brace against Blackpool in the return fixture. He scored a total of 43 goals in 175 games in all competitions for John Rudge's Port Vale.

=== Later career ===
At age 33, he was given a free transfer to Hereford United in May 1994. He would play a total of 85 games for the "Bulls" in all competitions, scoring 18 goals, as they posted a 16th-place finish in 1994–95, before missing out on promotion out of the Third Division under the stewardship of Graham Turner in 1995–96 after losing out to Darlington at the play-off semi-final stage. Following this disappointment, he joined non-League side Solihull Borough. He helped Solihull to reach the first round of the FA Cup for the second time in their history in 1997–98 and scored in both their 1–1 draw with Darlington at Feethams, and the 3–3 draw in the replay at Damson Park – Darlington won the resulting penalty shoot-out.

== Style of play ==
Cross was a forward who made use of his hold up play and headed goal scoring abilities to participate in the attack, despite his lack of pace.

== Post-retirement ==
After hanging up his boots as a player, he managed non-League sides Redditch United and Studley KBL, before leaving the game completely in 2004, to work as a financial advisor.

== Career statistics ==
Appearances and goals by club, season and competition
Club	Season	League			FA Cup		Other		Total	
Club	Season	Division	Apps	Goals	Apps	Goals	Apps	Goals	Apps	Goals
West Bromwich Albion	1980–81	First Division	2	1	0	0	0	0	2	1
West Bromwich Albion	1981–82	First Division	22	2	2	0	3	1	27	3
West Bromwich Albion	1982–83	First Division	32	4	1	0	1	1	34	5
West Bromwich Albion	1983–84	First Division	25	3	1	0	3	0	29	3
West Bromwich Albion	1984–85	First Division	24	5	1	1	2	1	27	7
West Bromwich Albion	Total		105	15	5	1	9	3	119	19
Walsall	1985–86	Third Division	44	21	4	1	5	2	53	24
Walsall	1986–87	Third Division	39	16	7	2	5	0	51	18
Walsall	1987–88	Third Division	26	8	2	0	7	1	35	9
Walsall	Total		109	45	13	3	17	3	139	51
Leicester City	1987–88	Second Division	17	6	0	0	0	0	17	6
Leicester City	1988–89	Second Division	41	9	1	0	6	1	48	10
Leicester City	Total		58	15	1	0	6	1	65	16
Port Vale	1989–90	Second Division	42	13	3	1	5	1	50	15
Port Vale	1990–91	Second Division	19	3	0	0	3	0	22	3
Port Vale	1991–92	Second Division	8	0	0	0	0	0	8	0
Port Vale	1992–93	Second Division	37	12	4	0	6	0	47	12
Port Vale	1993–94	Second Division	37	12	5	0	5	1	47	13
Port Vale	Total		143	40	12	1	19	2	174	43
Hereford United	1994–95	Third Division	28	6	2	0	6	1	36	7
Hereford United	1995–96	Third Division	37	8	4	1	8	2	49	11
Hereford United	Total		65	14	6	1	14	3	85	18
Career total			480	129	37	6	65	12	582	147

== Honours ==
Port Vale

- Football League Trophy: 1992–93
- Football League Third Division second-place promotion: 1993–94
