= Carl Muggleton =

English footballer (born 1968)

Personal information
- Full name: Carl David Muggleton
- Date of birth: 13 September 1968 (age 58)
- Place of birth: Leicester, England
- Height: 6 ft 1 in (1.85 m)
- Position: Goalkeeper

Senior career*
Years	Team	Apps	(Gls)
1985–1994	Leicester City	46	(0)
1987	→ Chesterfield (loan)	17	(0)
1988	→ Blackpool (loan)	2	(0)
1988	→ Hartlepool United (loan)	8	(0)
1990	→ Stockport County (loan)	4	(0)
1990	→ Liverpool (loan)	0	(0)
1993	→ Stoke City (loan)	6	(0)
1993	→ Sheffield United (loan)	0	(0)
1994	Celtic	12	(0)
1994–2001	Stoke City	149	(0)
1995	→ Rotherham United (loan)	6	(0)
1996	→ Sheffield United (loan)	1	(0)
1999	→ Mansfield Town (loan)	9	(0)
1999–2000	→ Chesterfield (loan)	5	(0)
2001	→ Cardiff City (loan)	6	(0)
2001–2002	Cheltenham Town	7	(0)
2002	→ Bradford City (loan)	4	(0)
2002–2006	Chesterfield	112	(0)
2006–2008	Mansfield Town	52	(0)
Total		446	(0)

International career
1990	England U21	1	(0)
- * Club domestic league appearances and goals

Carl David Muggleton (born 13 September 1968) is an English professional football goalkeeper who made over 550 appearances in the Football League and Scottish Premier League for a number of clubs, most notably Leicester City, Stoke City, Celtic, Chesterfield and Mansfield Town.

== Playing career ==
Muggleton began his career in 1986 as an apprentice at Leicester City, where he made 54 first-team appearances in all competitions in seven years. He also had loan spells at Chesterfield, Blackpool, Hartlepool United, Stockport County, Liverpool, Stoke City and Sheffield United during his tenure at Filbert Street. He played for Leicester in the 1992 Second Division play-off final against Blackburn Rovers, when he saved a penalty at Wembley Stadium but finished on the losing side.

In January 1994, Muggleton was signed by Scottish club, Celtic, for whom he made 13 appearances in the remainder of the 1993–94 season, before joining Stoke City in the summer of 1994 for a fee of £150,000. In a seven-year spell at Stoke, Muggleton played more than 170 games. He was also loaned to Rotherham, Sheffield United, Chesterfield, Mansfield Town and Cardiff City. Muggleton was released by Stoke in the summer of 2001 and joined Cheltenham. However, he was kept out of the side by Steve Book and after a one-month loan at Bradford City, he was allowed to leave the club, and join Chesterfield in May 2002, where manager Dave Rushbury described him as, "...a mature goalkeeper who will provide the voice of experience behind our younger defenders."

Muggleton played over 120 games for Chesterfield during his four-year stay with the club. He signed a new two-year contract in May 2004, but left Chesterfield by mutual consent in March 2006, and joined local rivals Mansfield Town in July 2006 to provide cover for first-choice goalkeeper Jason White. He made 21 appearances for Mansfield in the 2006–07 season, and was offered a new contract in May 2007. After Mansfield Town were relegated to the Conference National at the end of the 2007–08 season, he was released by the club.

At international level, Muggleton played once for England Under-21, in a match against France in 1990.

== Coaching career ==
After leaving Mansfield Town, he joined Notts County in July 2008 as a part-time goalkeeping coach. On 23 July 2012 he joined Gillingham as their goalkeeping coach, a role he then took up at Barnet in July 2016. He then took up the position of goalkeeper coach and head of recruitment at Chesterfield in May 2018, but left on 27 December after Martin Allen was sacked.

== Personal life ==
After ending his playing career Muggleton became a driving instructor in the Leicestershire area. His son Sam is also a professional footballer.

== Career statistics ==
Appearances and goals by club, season and competition
Club	Season	League			FA Cup		League Cup		Other		Total	
Club	Season	Division	Apps	Goals	Apps	Goals	Apps	Goals	Apps	Goals	Apps	Goals
Leicester City	1987–88	Second Division	0	0	0	0	0	0	0	0	0	0
Leicester City	1988–89	Second Division	3	0	0	0	0	0	0	0	3	0
Leicester City	1989–90	Second Division	0	0	0	0	0	0	0	0	0	0
Leicester City	1990–91	Second Division	22	0	1	0	0	0	0	0	23	0
Leicester City	1991–92	Second Division	4	0	2	0	0	0	4 (Note: Three appearances in Football League Second Division play-offs and one appearance in Full Members' Cup)	0	10	0
Leicester City	1992–93	First Division	17	0	0	0	0	0	1 (Note: Appearances in Anglo-Italian Cup)	0	18	0
Leicester City	1993–94	First Division	0	0	0	0	0	0	0	0	0	0
Leicester City	Total		46	0	3	0	0	0	5	0	54	0
Chesterfield (loan)	1987–88	Third Division	17	0	0	0	0	0	2 (Note: Appearances in Football League Trophy)	0	19	0
Blackpool (loan)	1987–88	Third Division	2	0	0	0	0	0	0	0	2	0
Hartlepool United (loan)	1988–89	Fourth Division	8	0	0	0	0	0	2	0	10	0
Stockport County (loan)	1989–90	Fourth Division	4	0	0	0	0	0	0	0	4	0
Stoke City (loan)	1993–94	First Division	6	0	0	0	1	0	2	0	9	0
Celtic	1994	Scottish Premier Division	12	0	1	0	0	0	0	0	13	0
Stoke City	1994–95	First Division	24	0	0	0	3	0	4	0	31	0
Stoke City	1995–96	First Division	6	0	0	0	0	0	0	0	6	0
Stoke City	1996–97	First Division	33	0	0	0	4	0	—		37	0
Stoke City	1997–98	First Division	34	0	1	0	5	0	—		40	0
Stoke City	1998–99	Second Division	40	0	2	0	2	0	2	0	46	0
Stoke City	1999–2000	Second Division	0	0	0	0	0	0	0	0	0	0
Stoke City	2000–01	Second Division	12	0	2	0	3	0	0	0	17	0
Stoke City	Total		149	0	5	0	17	0	6	0	177	0
Rotherham United (loan)	1995–96	Second Division	6	0	0	0	0	0	1	0	7	0
Sheffield United (loan)	1995–96	First Division	1	0	0	0	0	0	0	0	1	0
Mansfield Town (loan)	1999–2000	Third Division	9	0	0	0	0	0	0	0	9	0
Chesterfield (loan)	1999–2000	Second Division	5	0	0	0	0	0	0	0	5	0
Cardiff City (loan)	2000–01	Third Division	6	0	0	0	0	0	0	0	6	0
Cheltenham Town	2001–02	Third Division	6	0	0	0	1	0	0	0	7	0
Cheltenham Town	2002–03	Third Division	1	0	0	0	0	0	0	0	1	0
Cheltenham Town	Total		7	0	0	0	1	0	0	0	8	0
Bradford City (loan)	2001–02	First Division	4	0	1	0	0	0	0	0	5	0
Chesterfield	2002–03	Second Division	26	0	1	0	2	0	2	0	31	0
Chesterfield	2003–04	Second Division	46	0	1	0	1	0	1	0	49	0
Chesterfield	2004–05	League One	37	0	1	0	1	0	1	0	40	0
Chesterfield	2005–06	League One	3	0	0	0	1	0	1	0	5	0
Chesterfield	Total		112	0	3	0	5	0	5	0	125	0
Mansfield Town	2006–07	League Two	16	0	3	0	0	0	1	0	20	0
Mansfield Town	2007–08	League Two	36	0	4	0	1	0	1	0	42	0
Mansfield Town	Total		52	0	7	0	1	0	2	0	62	0
Career total			446	0	20	0	24	0	25	0	515	0

== Honours ==
Stoke City

- Football League Trophy: 1999–2000

Cheltenham Town

- Football League Third Division play-offs: 2002
