= Paul Willis (English footballer) =

English footballer

Personal information
- Full name: Paul Edward Willis
- Date of birth: 24 January 1970
- Place of birth: Liverpool, England
- Date of death: 7 September 2011 (aged 41)
- Position: Midfielder

Youth career
- Halifax Town

Senior career*
Years	Team	Apps	(Gls)
1988–1989	Halifax Town	5	(0)
1989–19??	Darlington	5	(1)
1992	Southport	2	(0)
- * Club domestic league appearances and goals

Paul Edward Willis (24 January 1970 – 9 July 2011) was an English footballer who played as a midfielder in the Football League for Halifax Town and Darlington. He also played in Darlington's 1989–90 Conference-winning team, and in the Northern Premier League for Southport.

Willis was born in Liverpool in 1970. His older brother Jimmy also became a footballer. Paul Willis and wife Dawn had two children. He died of pancreatic cancer in 2011 at the age of 41.
