= Colin Gordon (footballer) =

English footballer (born 1963)

Personal information
- Full name: Colin Kenneth Gordon
- Date of birth: 17 January 1963 (age 63)
- Place of birth: Stourbridge, England
- Height: 6 ft 1 in (1.85 m)
- Position: Striker

Senior career*
Years	Team	Apps	(Gls)
- Lye Town
–	Oldbury United		
1984–1986	Swindon Town	72	(34)
1986–1987	Wimbledon	3	(0)
1987	→ Gillingham (loan)	4	(2)
1987–1988	Reading	24	(9)
1988	→ Bristol City (loan)	8	(4)
1988–1989	Fulham	17	(2)
1989–1991	Birmingham City	26	(3)
1990	→ Hereford United (loan)	6	(0)
1990–1991	→ Walsall (loan)	6	(1)
1991	→ Bristol Rovers (loan)	4	(0)
1991–1992	Leicester City	24	(5)
1992–1993	Kidderminster Harriers	21	(4)
1993	→ Gloucester City (loan)	2	(?)
1994–1995	Stourbridge	25	(7)

Managerial career
- 2015: Kidderminster Harriers (caretaker)
- 2016: Kidderminster Harriers (caretaker)
- 2019: Kidderminster Harriers (caretaker)
- * Club domestic league appearances and goals

Colin Kenneth Gordon (born 17 January 1963) is an English former footballer born in Stourbridge, Worcestershire, who played as a striker.

He scored 60 goals in 194 appearances in the Football League playing for Swindon Town, Wimbledon, Gillingham, Reading, Bristol City, Fulham, Birmingham City, Hereford United, Walsall, Bristol Rovers and Leicester City. He went on to play non-League football for Kidderminster Harriers, Gloucester City, on loan from Kidderminster, and Stourbridge.

After his playing career concluded, Gordon went into sports agency and was subsequently described in 2020 as "one of the best and most respected agents of the last 20 years". His company represented England national team manager Steve McClaren and players David James and Theo Walcott, among others. He came to particular notice when he made an attack on football finance, alleging significant levels of corruption within the game.

In April 2015 Gordon returned to Kidderminster Harriers as new football development director of the club. When Gary Whild was removed from the position as manager in September 2015 Gordon was made caretaker manager until the appointment of Dave Hockaday on 9 October 2015. In November 2015 he bought the majority share of the Harriers. Following the sacking of Hockaday on 7 January 2016 Gordon was once again installed as caretaker.

In 2016 Gordon unveiled plans to open a 'football university' in Kidderminster, beginning in the 2017–18 campaign. The following year it was announced that Gordon intended to move the Harriers away from their Aggborough home to an industrial estate near to Stourport, arguing that "the simple fact of the matter is that we cannot be at the heart of our community if we're sat in the middle of a housing estate."

The plans, though, came to nothing. After relegation to the National League North, and a third spell for Gordon as manager, he sold his stake in the club to a local consortium in October 2019.

Alongside his agency commitments, Gordon is a UEFA A Licence holder and has been coach of the England national powerchair football team since 2013. The team have since won the 2019 European Championship, and were runners-up at the 2023 World Cup. Gordon's son Chris is the team's goalkeeper.

== Honours ==
Swindon Town

- Football League Fourth Division: 1985–86
