= Paul Fitzpatrick =

English footballer (born 1965)

Personal information
- Full name: Paul James Fitzpatrick
- Date of birth: 5 October 1965 (age 61)
- Place of birth: Liverpool, England
- Height: 6 ft 4 in (1.93 m)
- Position: Central defender

Youth career
- Liverpool
- Tranmere Rovers

Senior career*
Years	Team	Apps	(Gls)
1985–1986	Bolton Wanderers	14	(0)
1986–1988	Bristol City	44	(7)
1988–1991	Carlisle United	109	(4)
1988	→ Preston North End (loan)	2	(0)
1991–1993	Leicester City	27	(4)
1993	Birmingham City	7	(0)
1993	→ Bury (loan)	9	(1)
1993–1994	Hamilton Academical	18	(1)
1994	Northampton Town	2	(1)
1994	Shenzhen FC		
199?–1995	Leicester United		
1995–199?	Forest Green Rovers		
–	Corby Town		
1997–1999	Gresley Rovers		
1999–????	Workington		
Total		232	(18)
- * Club domestic league appearances and goals

Paul James Fitzpatrick (born 5 October 1965) is an English former professional footballer who scored 17 goals in 218 appearances in the Football League playing for Bolton Wanderers, Bristol City, Carlisle United, Preston North End, Leicester City, Birmingham City, Bury and Northampton Town.

== Life and career ==
Fitzpatrick was born in Liverpool. When he left school, he joined Liverpool as a trainee, and, still as a junior, spent some time with Tranmere Rovers before signing for Bolton Wanderers in March 1985. After 18 months and 14 league games, Fitzpatrick, a central defender, joined Bristol City, where he spent two years, playing in about half City's games. Carlisle United of the Fourth Division paid £40,000 for Fitzpatrick's services in October 1988. His arrival is credited with helping to "spark a revival" which raised Carlisle from 23rd place at the end of the previous season to a mid-table position in 1989. He was Player of the Season in the 1989–90 season as the club narrowly failed to reach the play-offs. A season later, Fitzpatrick moved up two divisions to join Leicester City, where he played 27 league games in a year and a half before embarking on a tour of the lower reaches of the Football League with Birmingham City, Bury and Northampton Town and a few months in the Scottish First Division (second tier) with Hamilton Academical. He then moved into non-League football with Leicester United, Forest Green Rovers, Corby Town, a spell as assistant to Garry Birtles as manager of Gresley Rovers, and Workington.

== Honours ==
Bristol City

- Associate Members' Cup runner-up: 1986–87

Individual

- PFA Team of the Year: 1989–90 Fourth Division
