= Jimmy Willis (footballer) =

English footballer and manager

Personal information
- Full name: James Anthony Willis
- Date of birth: 12 July 1968 (age 58)
- Place of birth: Liverpool, England
- Height: 6 ft 0 in (1.83 m)
- Position: Defender

Youth career
- 1985–1986: Blackburn Rovers

Senior career*
Years	Team	Apps	(Gls)
1986–1987	Halifax Town	0	(0)
1987–1988	Stockport County	10	(0)
1988–1991	Darlington	90	(6)
1991–1997	Leicester City	60	(3)
1992	→ Bradford City (loan)	9	(1)

Managerial career
- 2001–2002: Bamber Bridge
- * Club domestic league appearances and goals

James Anthony Willis (born 12 July 1968) is an English former professional footballer and manager who played as a defender from 1986 to 1997.

He played in the Premier League for Leicester City and in the Football League for Halifax Town, Stockport County, Darlington, and Bradford City. During his career, he scored goals in all of the top five divisions of the English football league system, a record held by Willis alone until 2004, when it was equalled by then Liverpool defender Steve Finnan. From 2001 to 2002, he was manager of Bamber Bridge.

== Playing career ==
Born in Liverpool, Willis served his apprenticeship at Blackburn Rovers, before he signed for Halifax Town in 1986. His impact at both Halifax and subsequent club Stockport County was limited, although he came into his own at Darlington where he won medals for both the Conference and Football League Fourth Division titles despite suffering from a broken leg in 1991. Willis' form at Feethams netted him a £250,000 move to Leicester City in late 1991, although he initially struggled at the higher level and was even loaned out to Bradford City. He eventually adapted to the higher standard of football and was the man of the match in the play-off final of 1994 when Leicester secured promotion. In 1996, Willis was set to join Burnley but the deal collapsed at the last minute because of contractual problems. However, a year later, Willis was forced to retire from the game because of injury.

Willis briefly came into the media spotlight again in 2007 when it was reported on Sky Sports that Steve Finnan was the only player to score in the top five divisions of English football. However, as reported in the Liverpool Echo, Willis had scored for Darlington in both the Conference and the Fourth Division, for Bradford in the Third Division and for Leicester in the First Division (second tier of football) and the Premier League.

== Managerial career ==
Willis dreams of breaking into football management, and briefly had a spell in charge of Bamber Bridge of the Northern Premier League. He was appointed manager in November 2001, taking over from Tony Greenwood, but only lasted two months until he left because of the financial problems at the club.

== Personal life ==
Willis's younger brother Paul also became a footballer. Willis went on to work as a taxi driver in his native Liverpool.

== Honours ==
Darlington

- Football League Fourth Division: 1990–91
- Football Conference: 1989–90

Leicester City

- Football League First Division play-offs: 1994
