= Steve Thompson (footballer, born 1964) =

English footballer and coach

Personal information
- Full name: Steven James Thompson
- Date of birth: 2 November 1964 (age 62)
- Place of birth: Oldham, England
- Height: 5 ft 11 in (1.80 m)
- Position: Midfielder

Team information
- Current team: Blackpool (caretaker manager)

Senior career*
Years	Team	Apps	(Gls)
1982–1991	Bolton Wanderers	333	(50)
1991	Luton Town	5	(0)
1991–1995	Leicester City	127	(18)
1995–1997	Burnley	49	(1)
1997–2000	Rotherham United	103	(14)
2000–2001	Halifax Town	36	(2)
2001–2002	Leigh RMI	8	(0)
Total		661	(85)

Managerial career
- 2008–2009: Blackpool (co-caretaker)
- 2012: Blackpool (caretaker)
- 2013: Blackpool (caretaker)
- 2023: Oldham Athletic (caretaker)
- 2026–: Blackpool (caretaker)
- * Club domestic league appearances and goals

Steven James Thompson (born 2 November 1964) is an English retired professional footballer who played as a midfielder. He was the Head of Recruitment for National League side Oldham Athletic and left in October 2023. As of 20 November 2026, he has been the caretaker manager and interim head-coach of Blackpool F.C. after Ian Evatt’s departure the previous day.

== Playing career ==
Thompson started his playing career as an apprentice at Bolton Wanderers before signing his first contract in 1982, and was at the club until 1991 playing in a total of 410 games, and scoring 57 goals in all competitions. He played on the winning side at Wembley in 1989 in the Football League Trophy final. On 13 August 1991, he signed for Luton Town for £180,000. His stay with the Hatters was short-lived; he made just five league appearances before moving to Leicester City two months later, on 22 October, where he played in 121 league games scoring six goals. He won the Player of the Season award twice while with the Foxes and later described his time with the club as probably the best three years as a footballer.

On 24 February 1995, Thompson moved to Burnley for a £200,000 transfer fee. He made 49 league appearances, scoring one goal, before leaving at the end of the 1996–97 season. On 1 August 1997, he signed for Rotherham United, where he made 106 league appearances and scored fourteen goals. In the 2000–01 season, he joined Halifax Town, where he spent one season, playing 36 games and scoring two goals. He then spent a season with Leigh RMI before retiring from football.

== Coaching career ==
=== Blackpool ===
Thompson started coaching with the Centre of Excellence at Blackpool before becoming Head of the Youth Department in 2005. Following the appointment of Simon Grayson as Blackpool's manager Thompson was promoted to first team coach in 2006, and he coached the team in the 2006–07 season as the Seasiders were promoted to the Championship, making their first return to the second tier of English football for 29 years. In March 2008 he signed a new two-year extension to his contract at Bloomfield Road. In December 2008 following the departure of the Seasiders manager Simon Grayson to Leeds United, Thompson became the assistant manager on a caretaker basis, with Tony Parkes as the caretaker manager. After Parkes' first game in charge, a 1–1 Boxing Day draw against Sheffield Wednesday at Hillsborough, Parkes revealed that the Blackpool board was willing to give him the job full-time, with Thompson as his assistant, if the team continue to perform as they did under Grayson. Speaking of his role as assistant manager at what he considers to be his hometown club, Thompson said, "I am enjoying the responsibility and myself and Tony have been bouncing ideas off each other. Tony will probably make the major decisions but I am enjoying it because it is the club that I love. I am a local lad and I am just as excited doing what I'm doing now as Simon Grayson probably is at Leeds." When Ian Holloway became Blackpool manager in summer 2009, Thompson stayed on as his assistant.

Three and a half years later, when Holloway left to become manager of Crystal Palace, Thompson was appointed caretaker manager before the match at Derby County on 3 November. It was Holloway who had picked the team, however. After the match, which Blackpool lost 4–1, Thompson stated his interest in applying for the job on a full-time basis. Blackpool won their next fixture, with Thompson still in charge, 2–0 at Sheffield Wednesday.

He resumed his caretaker role two months later when Michael Appleton left to become manager of Blackburn Rovers. He picked the team to face Charlton Athletic on 12 January, but they lost 2–1.

=== Huddersfield Town ===
On 6 June 2014, Thompson was hired as Mark Robins' new assistant manager at Huddersfield Town. He retained the position under new Huddersfield manager Chris Powell.

=== Leeds United ===
On 18 December 2014, Thompson was hired as Neil Redfearn's new assistant at Leeds United. On 2 April 2015, Thompson was suspended by then Leeds director of football, Nicola Salerno for an 'internal matter'. Head Coach Neil Redfearn was kept in the dark as to why Thompson had been suspended.

On 24 June 2015, on the day Salerno left the club, Salerno gave an interview to Sky Sports, saying about Thompson: "I had a bad relationship with Steve but I didn't speak to Massimo about him."

=== Preston North End ===
On 1 July 2015, Thompson was appointed first-team coach of newly promoted Football League Championship side Preston North End.

=== Oldham Athletic ===
On 9 November 2022, it was announced that Thompson had been appointed as Head of Recruitment at his hometown club Oldham Athletic. On 17 September 2023, he was appointed interim manager following the sacking of David Unsworth. He held this caretaker position until 12 October with a managerial appointment imminent.

== Personal life ==
Thompson's son, Curtis, signed as a first-year professional with Blackpool for the 2012–13 season.

== Managerial statistics ==
As of 20 November 2026

Team	Nat	From	To	Record				
Team	Nat	From	To	G	W	D	L	Win %
Blackpool (caretaker)	(England)	3 November 2012	7 November 2012	2	1	0	1	50.00
Blackpool (caretaker)	(England)	11 January 2013	18 February 2013	8	3	0	5	37.50
Oldham Athletic (caretaker)	(England)	17 September 2023	12 October 2023	6	3	3	0	50.00
Blackpool (caretaker)	(England)	20 November 2026	present	1	0	0	1	0.00
Total				17	7	3	7	41.18

== Honours ==
Bolton Wanderers

- Associate Members' Cup: 1988–89; runner-up: 1985–86

Leicester City

- Football League First Division play-offs: 1994

Individual

- PFA Team of the Year: 1989–90 Third Division
