= Phil Gee =

English footballer

Personal information
- Full name: Philip John Gee
- Date of birth: 19 December 1964 (age 61)
- Place of birth: Pelsall, England
- Height: 5 ft 9 in (1.75 m)
- Position: Forward

Senior career*
Years	Team	Apps	(Gls)
1984–1985	Gresley Rovers	5	(6)
1985–1992	Derby County	124	(26)
1992–1996	Leicester City	53	(9)
1995	→ Plymouth Argyle (loan)	6	(0)
1996–1998	Hednesford Town		
1998	Shepshed Dynamo		
- * Club domestic league appearances and goals

Philip John Gee (born 19 December 1964) is an English former professional footballer who played as a forward from 1984 to 1998.

== Playing career ==
Gee played in the Premier League for Leicester City, scoring the goal to earn them their first ever Premier League point in a 1–1 draw against QPR. He also played in the Football League for Derby County and Plymouth Argyle, before finishing his career in Non-league with Hednesford Town and Shepshed Dynamo.
