= Ian Ormondroyd =

English footballer

Personal information
- Full name: Ian Ormondroyd
- Date of birth: 22 September 1964 (age 62)
- Place of birth: Bradford, England
- Height: 6 ft 5 in (1.96 m)
- Position: Striker

Senior career*
Years	Team	Apps	(Gls)
1984–1985	Thackley		
1985–1989	Bradford City	87	(20)
1987	→ Oldham Athletic (loan)	10	(1)
1989–1991	Aston Villa	56	(6)
1991–1992	Derby County	25	(8)
1992–1995	Leicester City	77	(7)
1995	→ Hull City (loan)	10	(6)
1995–1996	Bradford City	38	(6)
1996–1997	Oldham Athletic	31	(8)
1997–1998	Scunthorpe United	20	(0)
Total		354	(62)
- * Club domestic league appearances and goals as of 10:00, 22 November 2007 (UTC)

Ian Ormondroyd (born 22 September 1964) is an English former professional footballer who made more than 350 appearances in the Football League and Premier League.

== Club career ==
Born in Bradford, Yorkshire, Ormondroyd played for Bradford City, Oldham Athletic, Aston Villa, Derby County, Leicester City, Hull City and Scunthorpe United. He was Leicester's record signing in 1992 when he joined from Derby for £350,000.

At the age of 33, Ormondroyd retired from football due to arthritis in his left ankle.

== Later career ==
He returned to Bradford City as football in the community officer, and served as CEO of the Bradford City FC Community Foundation until 2026.

== Personal life ==
His son, Jack, plays rugby league for the Salford Red Devils in the Super League.

== Honours ==
Leicester City

- Football League First Division play-offs: 1994

Bradford City

- Football League Second Division play-offs: 1996
