= Tommy Wright (footballer, born 1966) =

Scottish footballer and coach

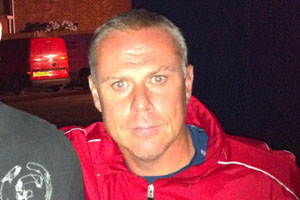

Personal information
- Full name: Thomas Elliott Wright
- Date of birth: 10 January 1966 (age 60)
- Place of birth: Dunfermline, Scotland
- Height: 5 ft 7 in (1.70 m)
- Position: Winger

Senior career*
| Years | Team | Apps | (Gls) |
| 1982–1986 | Leeds United | 92 | (28) |
| 1986–1989 | Oldham Athletic | 112 | (23) |
| 1989–1992 | Leicester City | 129 | (22) |
| 1992–1995 | Middlesbrough | 53 | (5) |
| 1995–1997 | Bradford City | 45 | (5) |
| 1997 | Oldham Athletic | 12 | (2) |
| 1997–1998 | St Johnstone | 5 | (0) |
| 1998 | Livingston | 7 | (1) |
| 1998–2000 | Doncaster Rovers | 28 | (1) |
| Total | | 455 | (86) |

Managerial career
- 2012: Chesterfield (caretaker)
- 2016: Barnsley (caretaker)
- 2019: Carlisle United (joint caretaker)
- 2021: Swindon Town (caretaker)
- 2022: Oldham Athletic (caretaker)
- * Club domestic league appearances and goals

Thomas Elliott Wright (born 10 January 1966) is a Scottish football coach and former player. A winger, he made nearly 450 appearances in the English Football League and Premier League, and also had short spells in the Scottish League. He was most recently a First-Team Coach at Oldham Athletic.

== Career ==
=== Coaching ===
Having worked previously as his assistant manager at Oldham Athletic, Wright followed John Sheridan to League Two side Chesterfield to serve in the same capacity, in June 2009. He was made Caretaker Manager following the sacking of Sheridan on 27 August 2012, with Mark Crossley assisting.

Wright was appointed assistant head coach of Barnsley on 25 February 2015

On 21 June 2018, he linked up with John Sheridan once more when being appointed the new assistant manager of Carlisle United.

=== Swindon Town ===
On 9 July 2019, he joined the coaching team at Swindon Town.

In November 2020, Swindon Town F.C. manager John Sheridan stressed that he had no plans to change the existing coaching team. He wanted Wright and Noel Hunt to stay at Swindon Town F.C. and was looking forward to working with them.

In the same month, it was reported that former Swindon Town F.C. manager Richie Wellens was planning to bring coach Wright to Salford City F.C. but Wright turned down his offer and continued to coach the Swindon Town F.C. team.

In February 2021, Wright admitted he wasn't sure whether he and manager Sheridan would keep their jobs if they won their Wigan Athletic F.C. game.

On 18 April 2021, following the resignation of first-team manager John Sheridan, Wright was placed in charge of the first-team with Swindon sitting bottom of the league, seven points off of safety with four games remaining.

=== Oldham return ===
On 25 January 2022, following the return of Sheridan to Oldham Athletic, Wright returned to the club as a coach. He left the club on 26 September 2022 following the recent change in management.

== Corruption conviction ==
Wright was suspended by Barnsley on 28 September 2016 pending investigation into allegations that he had taken a £5,000 cash bribe to arrange player's transfers. His criminal trial was held in October 2019, at which he was convicted of soliciting and accepting bribes.

=== Bribery incident ===
In August 2018, the City of London Police announced that the former assistant coach of Barnsley F.C., Wright, had been charged with bribery offences. In December 2019, Swindon Town F.C.'s first-team coach decided not to sack Wright. Although Wright had been found guilty of taking a bribe for leaking commercial information about players to the public, he was allowed to keep his assistant job.

== Managerial Statistics ==
Managerial record by team and tenure
| Team | From | To | Record | | | | | Ref. |
| Team | From | To | P | W | D | L | Win % | Ref. |
|---|---|---|---|---|---|---|---|---|
| Swindon Town (caretaker) | 18 April 2021 | 26 May 2021 | 4 | 2 | 0 | 2 | 50.00 | |
| Total | | | 4 | 2 | 0 | 2 | 50.00 | |

== Honours ==
Bradford City

- Football League Second Division play-offs: 1996
