= Michael Trotter =

English footballer

Personal information
- Date of birth: 27 October 1969 (age 57)
- Place of birth: Hartlepool, England
- Height: 6 ft 3 in (1.91 m)
- Position: Midfielder

Senior career*
| Years | Team | Apps | (Gls) |
| 1987–1990 | Middlesbrough | 0 | (0) |
| 1988–1989 | → Doncaster Rovers (loan) | 3 | (0) |
| 1990–1992 | Darlington | 29 | (2) |
| 1992–1993 | Leicester City | 3 | (0) |
| 1993–1994 | Chesterfield | 15 | (1) |
| 1994–1995 | Buxton | ? | (?) |
| 1995–1997 | Halifax Town | 65 | (4) |
| 1997–1998 | VS Rugby | ? | (?) |
| Total | | 115 | (7) |
- * Club domestic league appearances and goals

Michael Trotter (born 27 October 1969) is an English former professional footballer who played in the Football League, as a midfielder.

== Honours ==
Darlington

- Football League Fourth Division: 1990–91
