= David Oldfield (footballer) =

English footballer

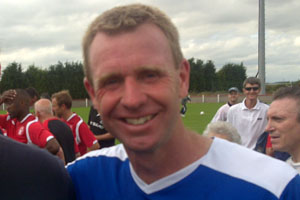

Personal information
- Full name: David Charles Oldfield
- Date of birth: 30 May 1968 (age 58)
- Place of birth: Perth, Australia
- Position: Midfielder

Youth career
- Stoke Goldington, Almondsbury Rangers

Senior career*
Years	Team	Apps	(Gls)
1986–1989	Luton Town	39	(8)
1989–1990	Manchester City	30	(9)
1990–1995	Leicester City	221	(32)
1995	→ Millwall (loan)	17	(6)
1995–1998	Luton Town	140	(24)
1998–2000	Stoke City	74	(7)
2000–2002	Peterborough United	97	(5)
2002–2004	Oxford United	37	(3)
2005–2007	Stafford Rangers	22	(0)
2007	Tamworth	1	(0)
2007–2008	Brackley Town	0	(0)
Total		678	(94)

International career
1988	England U21	1	(0)

Managerial career
- 2005: Oxford United (caretaker manager)
- 2007–2008: Brackley Town
- 2011: Peterborough United (caretaker manager)
- 2018: Peterborough United (caretaker manager)
- 2020–2022: Oxford City
- 2022: Weymouth
- 2025–: Exeter City (First Team Coach and Under 18's Manager)
- * Club domestic league appearances and goals

David Charles Oldfield (born 30 May 1968) is an English former professional footballer who played as a midfielder. He is first team coach and Under 18's lead at EFL League One Club Exeter City.

== Playing career ==
Born in Australia, Oldfield moved to England with his family at a young age. He began playing football as a boy for North Buckinghamshire village side Stoke Goldington, before being spotted by league outfit Luton Town in 1986, where he played 29 league games over the next three years, scoring four goals. While at Luton he received a callup to the England under-21 squad in March 1988.

Oldfield moved to Manchester City for a fee of £600,000 in March 1989, choosing to join City ahead of West Ham United. At City, Oldfield formed part of the squad that gained promotion to the First Division in 1988–89. Though Oldfield was at Maine Road for less than a year, he is fondly remembered for his two goals in the Manchester derby against local rivals United in September 1989 when City triumphed 5–1. Mel Machin, the manager who signed Oldfield for City, was sacked in November 1989. Less than a month after Howard Kendall was appointed as Machin's successor, Oldfield was sold. In an exchange valued at £650,000, Oldfield headed to Leicester City, and Wayne Clarke travelled in the opposite direction.

Oldfield stayed at Leicester for five years. He helped them win promotion to the Premier League in 1994, winning the playoffs at Wembley after losing there in the two previous seasons. He turned down a £250,000 move to Port Vale in 1994. He then had a successful loan spell at Millwall, but the move was not made permanent and he returned to Luton Town instead. However, he was unable to prevent their relegation to Division Two in 1996 and signed for Stoke City two years later. He spent two years with Stoke before a two-year spell at Peterborough United and then a two-year spell at Oxford United before he played his last professional game in 2004. He came out of retirement the following year to sign for non-league Stafford Rangers, where he spent two years. Tamworth confirmed the signing of Oldfield on 30 November 2007. Oldfield made his debut for the club against Leigh RMI in a 2–0 home victory on 1 December 2007, just one day after signing.

== Managerial career ==
Oldfield was named as Oxford caretaker manager after the dismissal of Ian Atkins in March 2004 but his first game in charge was postponed due to bad weather and Graham Rix was appointed before the next; Oldfield finally took charge of Oxford as caretaker manager for one game, a home defeat to Chester City, before the appointment of Brian Talbot in May 2005. He left Oxford's backroom staff in 2006.

Three days after Oldfield made his Tamworth debut, he was appointed as the new first team manager of Brackley Town on 4 December 2007, replacing Roger Ashby. In 2008 Oldfield was appointed as Reserve Team Manager at Peterborough United, and on 11 January 2011 he took charge of the first team for one match in between the departure of manager Gary Johnson and the appointment of Darren Ferguson as his replacement, a 2–1 home league win over Brentford.

In July 2011, Oldfield left Peterborough to join West Bromwich Albion as a development coach. On 12 June 2014, Oldfield joined Milton Keynes Dons as Head of Academy Coaching He was appointed assistant manager to Jimmy Floyd Hasselbaink at Burton Albion in November 2014. On 4 December 2015, Oldfield left Burton to join Hasselbaink at Queens Park Rangers.

Towards the end of the 2016–17 season Oldfield returned to Peterborough United on a trial basis after the departure of Lee Glover. At the end of the season he was appointed as assistant manager on a permanent basis under manager Grant McCann. He stepped in as caretaker-manager for one game in February 2018 after McCann's sacking, a 2–1 home victory over Walsall, before Steve Evans was appointed. Oldfield left the club the following month.

Oldfield was appointed manager of Oxford City in March 2020.

On 18 January 2022, he moved up a division to be appointed manager of National League side Weymouth, leaving Oxford City in fourth position in the National League South table. He left Weymouth by mutual consent on 14 September 2022

In January 2025, Oldfield was named under-18 lead coach at Exeter City.

== Career statistics ==
Appearances and goals by club, season and competition
Club	Season	League			FA Cup		League Cup		Other^{[A]}		Total	
Club	Season	Division	Apps	Goals	Apps	Goals	Apps	Goals	Apps	Goals	Apps	Goals
Luton Town	1987–88	First Division	8	3	0	0	1	0	2	2	11	5
Luton Town	1988–89	First Division	21	1	1	0	5	2	1	0	28	3
Luton Town	Total		29	4	1	0	6	2	3	2	39	8
Manchester City	1988–89	Second Division	11	3	0	0	0	0	0	0	11	3
Manchester City	1989–90	First Division	15	3	0	0	3	2	1	1	19	6
Manchester City	Total		26	6	0	0	3	2	1	1	30	9
Leicester City	1989–90	Second Division	20	5	0	0	0	0	0	0	20	5
Leicester City	1990–91	Second Division	42	7	1	0	2	0	1	0	46	7
Leicester City	1991–92	Second Division	41	4	2	0	4	0	6	1	53	5
Leicester City	1992–93	Division One	44	5	2	1	2	0	4	0	52	6
Leicester City	1993–94	Division One	27	4	1	1	3	1	3	1	37	7
Leicester City	1994–95	Premier League	14	1	1	1	1	0	0	0	16	2
Leicester City	Total		188	26	7	3	12	1	14	2	221	32
Millwall (loan)	1994–95	Division One	17	6	0	0	0	0	0	0	17	6
Luton Town	1995–96	Division One	34	2	1	0	2	0	2	0	39	2
Luton Town	1996–97	Division Two	38	6	1	0	5	2	4	3	46	11
Luton Town	1997–98	Division Two	45	10	1	0	4	0	3	1	53	11
Luton Town	Total		117	18	3	0	11	2	9	4	140	24
Stoke City	1998–99	Division Two	46	6	2	0	2	0	1	0	51	6
Stoke City	1999–2000	Division Two	19	1	0	0	3	0	1	0	23	1
Stoke City	Total		65	7	2	0	5	0	2	0	74	7
Peterborough United	1999–2000	Division Three	9	0	0	0	3	0	1	0	13	0
Peterborough United	2000–01	Division Two	39	3	5	1	2	0	0	0	46	4
Peterborough United	2001–02	Division Two	30	1	5	0	1	0	2	0	38	1
Peterborough United	Total		78	4	10	1	6	0	3	0	97	5
Oxford United	2002–03	Division Three	28	2	2	1	2	0	1	0	33	3
Oxford United	2003–04	Division Three	3	0	0	0	1	0	0	0	4	0
Oxford United	Total		31	2	2	1	3	0	1	0	37	3
Stafford Rangers	2006–07	Conference National	12	1	0	0	0	0	0	0	12	1
Stafford Rangers	2007–08	Conference National	10	0	0	0	0	0	0	0	10	0
Stafford Rangers	Total		22	1	0	0	0	0	0	0	22	1
Career Total			573	74	25	5	46	7	33	9	677	95

A. The "Other" column constitutes appearances and goals in the Anglo-Italian Cup, Football League Trophy, Football League play-offs and Full Members' Cup.

== Honours ==
Peterborough United

- Football League Third Division play-offs: 2000
