= Tony James (English footballer) =

English footballer

Personal information
- Full name: Anthony Craig James
- Date of birth: 27 June 1967 (age 59)
- Place of birth: Sheffield, England
- Position: Defender

Youth career
- Sheffield

Senior career*
Years	Team	Apps	(Gls)
1986–1988	Gainsborough Trinity		
1988–1989	Lincoln City	29	(0)
1989–1994	Leicester City	107	(11)
1994–1996	Hereford United	35	(4)
1996–1997	Plymouth Argyle	34	(1)
- * Club domestic league appearances and goals

Anthony Craig James (born 27 June 1967) is an English former professional footballer. He played as a centre back for Gainsborough Trinity, Lincoln City, Leicester City, Hereford United and Plymouth Argyle.

== Career ==
He is best remembered at Leicester as being the player who scored the goal that kept Leicester from dropping into the 3rd tier of English football for the first time, after his 24th minute close range conversion from a corner saw Leicester beat Oxford United 1–0 to climb out of the relegation on the final day of the 1990-91 season, which ultimately saw the start of the club's upturn in form in the 1990s. He was also awarded the club's Player of the Year award in the same season. However a broken leg in a game against Wolverhampton Wanderers in October 1991 and several injuries afterwards halted his progression and he never really claimed an extended run in the Leicester side after that.
