= Steve Walsh (footballer) =

English footballer (born 1964)

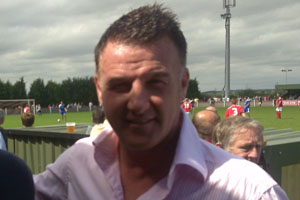

Personal information
- Full name: Steven Walsh
- Date of birth: 3 November 1964 (age 62)
- Place of birth: Preston, England
- Height: 6 ft 3 in (1.91 m)
- Position: Centre-back

Senior career*
Years	Team	Apps	(Gls)
1982–1986	Wigan Athletic	126	(4)
1986–2000	Leicester City	449	(62)
2000–2001	Norwich City	4	(0)
2001–2002	Tamworth	?	
2002	Coventry City	2	(0)
2002–2003	Tamworth	?	
Total		581	(66)
- * Club domestic league appearances and goals

Steven Walsh (born 3 November 1964) is an English former professional footballer who played as a centre-back, but at times was used as a striker.

He spent most of his career at Leicester City where he won two League Cups in 1997 and 2000, as well as featuring as a Premier League player across a number of seasons. He also played in the Football League for Wigan, Norwich City and Coventry City, with several stints with non-league Tamworth. He is the record holder for the most red cards in the Football League, with 13, a record he holds jointly with Roy McDonough.

== Career ==
=== Early years ===
Born in Preston, Lancashire in November 1964, Walsh won the 1984–85 Freight Rover Trophy with Wigan before following Bryan Hamilton to Leicester for £100,000, where he soon established himself as a no-nonsense central defender. In 1986, he received an eleven match ban after smashing the jaw of striker David Geddis, whilst playing for Leicester against Shrewsbury, part of his often violent reputation which included a longstanding rivalry with Wolverhampton Wanderers striker Steve Bull, which led to both being sent off in separate matches.

=== Leicester City ===
Brian Little made Walsh Leicester's club captain in 1992 and started playing him as a striker. He went on to score 15 goals that season including one in the Division 1 play-off final against Swindon Town at the end of the season. In 1993–94 he scored twice as Leicester won the final and promotion to the Premier League over Derby County, having missed much of that season due to a cruciate knee ligament injury.

Injury kept him out for most of the top flight season, but was returned to the captaincy by Martin O'Neill for the 1995–96 play-off final victory over Crystal Palace, a position he retained for the successful 1996–97 season, lifting the League Cup at Hillsborough having set up Emile Heskey's goal in the first game and Steve Claridge's winner in the replay. This was his testimonial season, with the likes of Paul Gascoigne and David Seaman playing in his benefit game. He was also captain when City lost the League Cup final to Tottenham Hotspur in 1999. His last European appearance was a 2–1 UEFA Cup defeat to Atlético Madrid at the Vicente Calderón stadium in 1997. Walsh is a hugely popular figure with Leicester fans, who nicknamed him "Captain Fantastic". Despite being left out of Leicester's squad for the 2000 Football League Cup Final he made three appearances and scored one goal during their victorious League Cup campaign.

=== Later career ===
Peter Taylor let Walsh leave Leicester in 2000, ending his spell at Filbert Street after 14 years, and after unsuccessful spells at Norwich and Coventry he coached junior football schools and ran a golf course in Spain. Still a cult favourite at the club, he currently writes a weekly column for the Leicester Mercury and has formed an events company with former Leicester Tigers rugby player Neil Back and another business partner. Walsh made an unsuccessful attempt to become the new manager of Leicester City when Gary Megson vacated the position in October 2007.

== Personal life ==
Walsh runs a company with former rugby player Neil Back and regularly attends home games at the King Power Stadium, and is often a guest during the half-time shows.

== Honours ==
Wigan Athletic

- Associate Members' Cup: 1984–85

Leicester City

- Football League First Division play-offs: 1994, 1996
- Football League Cup: 1996–97; runner-up: 1998–99

Individual

- Alan Hardaker Trophy: 1997

== See also ==
- 1994 Football League First Division play-off final
