= 1999–2000 Tranmere Rovers F.C. season =

Tranmere Rovers
1999–2000 season
- Chairman: Lorraine Rogers
- Manager: John Aldridge
- Stadium: Prenton Park
- Football League First Division: 13th
- FA Cup: Quarter-finals
- League Cup: Runner-up
- Top goalscorer: League: Wayne Allison (16); All: Wayne Allison (19)
- Average home league attendance: 7,273
Home colours

During the 1999–2000 English football season, Tranmere Rovers F.C. competed in the Football League First Division where they finished in 13th position on 57 points. Rovers had great success in the cup competitions reaching the final of the League Cup, losing 2–1 to Leicester, and also made the quarters in the FA Cup.

== Final league table ==
Pos	Team	Pld	W	D	L	GF	GA	GD	Pts
11	Blackburn Rovers	46	15	17	14	55	51	+4	62
12	Norwich City	46	14	15	17	45	50	−5	57
13	Tranmere Rovers	46	15	12	19	57	68	−11	57
14	Nottingham Forest	46	14	14	18	53	55	−2	56
15	Crystal Palace	46	13	15	18	57	67	−10	54

Rules for classification: 1) Points; 2) Goal difference; 3) Goals scored

== Results ==
Tranmere's score comes first

=== Legend ===
Win	Draw	Loss

=== Football League Division One ===
Match	Date	Opponent	Venue	Result	Attendance	Scorers
1	7 August 1999	Bolton Wanderers	H	0–0	7,674	
2	14 August 1999	Stockport County	A	1–2	6,555	Henry 30'
3	21 August 1999	Huddersfield Town	H	1–0	6,728	Koumas 8'
4	28 August 1999	Port Vale	A	0–1	4,657	
5	30 August 1999	Sheffield United	H	1–3	5,436	Yates 35'
6	3 September 1999	Barnsley	A	0–3	12,865	
7	11 September 1999	Blackburn Rovers	A	0–2	17,899	
8	18 September 1999	Portsmouth	H	2–4	5,870	Kelly 82', Challinor 90'
9	25 September 1999	Charlton Athletic	A	2–2	5,846	Santos 30', Allison 86'
10	3 October 1999	Crewe Alexandra	A	2–0	6,169	Allison 76', 85'
11	9 October 1999	Queens Park Rangers	A	1–2	9,357	Hill 54'
12	16 October 1999	Manchester City	H	1–1	13,208	Mahon 82' (pen)
13	19 October 1999	Grimsby Town	H	3–2	5,004	Allison 12', 31', G Jones 59'
14	23 October 1999	Crystal Palace	A	2–2	18,645	G Jones 82', Parkinson 90'
15	26 October 1999	Charlton Athletic	A	2–3	19,491	Roberts 37' Parkinson 38'
16	30 October 1999	Crewe Alexandra	H	2–0	5,917	Hill 63', Allison 80'
17	6 November 1999	West Bromwich Albion	H	3–0	6,623	Parkinson 34', 38', Mahon 82' (pen) 82'
18	12 November 1999	Ipswich Town	A	0–0	14,514	
19	20 November 1999	Nottingham Forest	H	3–0	6,693	Hill 53', Allison 66', Kelly 90'
20	23 November 1999	Birmingham City	A	1–3	21,132	Grainger (o.g.) 78'
21	27 November 1999	Wolverhampton Wanderers	H	1–0	8,017	Allison 50'
22	4 December 1999	Bolton Wanderers	A	3–2	13,534	Parkinson 18', Challinor 63', Taylor 79'
23	17 December 1999	Norwich City	H	1–2	5,863	Allison 14'
24	26 December 1999	Walsall	A	2–1	7,214	Parkinson 67', Allison 74'
25	28 December 1999	Swindon Town	H	3–1	8,068	Hill 11', Allison 13', 26'
26	3 January 2000	Fulham	A	0–1	11,377	
27	15 January 2000	Stockport County	H	0–0	7,565	
28	22 January 2000	Huddersfield Town	A	0–1	12,653	
29	5 February 2000	Sheffield United	A	1–3	14,219	Taylor 57'
30	11 February 2000	Barnsley	H	2–2	7,127	Parkinson 16', Kelly 57'
31	16 February 2000	Wolverhampton Wanderers	A	0–4	18,186	
32	1 March 2000	Portsmouth	A	2–1	10,759	Hazell 33', Yates 90'
33	4 March 2000	Blackburn Rovers	H	2–1	9,502	Mahon 47' (pen), Allison 90'
34	7 March 2000	West Bromwich Albion	A	0–2	11,958	
35	11 March 2000	Birmingham City	H	2–1	9,232	Koumas 4', G Jones 83'
36	18 March 2000	Nottingham Forest	A	1–1	4,428	Allison 34'
37	22 March 2000	Ipswich Town	H	0–2	6,933	
38	25 March 2000	Walsall	H	1–1	6,537	Allison 4'
39	1 April 2000	Norwich City	A	1–1	13,734	Sutch 38' (o.g.)
40	9 April 2000	Fulham	H	1–1	7,132	Kelly 72'
41	15 April 2000	Swindon Town	A	1–3	4,925	Hill 37'
42	18 April 2000	Port Vale	H	2–1	5,602	Kelly 60', 89'
43	22 April 2000	Manchester City	A	0–2	32,842	
44	24 April 2000	Queens Park Rangers	H	1–1	7,744	Mahon 52'
45	29 April 2000	Grimsby Town	A	2–1	5,427	Challinor 12', Allison 82'
46	7 May 2000	Crystal Palace	H	1–2	8,891	Taylor 46'

=== League Cup ===
Round	Date	Opponent	Venue	Result	Attendance	Scorers
R1 1st Leg	10 August 1999	Blackpool	A	1–2	3,298	Thompson 21' (o.g.)
R1 2nd Leg	10 August 1999	Blackpool	H	3–1	4,800	Taylor 26', Kelly 54', 55'
R2 1st Leg	14 September 1999	Coventry City	H	5–1	6,759	Taylor 50', 90', Kelly 58', 63', 80'
R2 2nd Leg	22 September 1999	Coventry City	A	1–3	12,433	Taylor 22'
R3	12 October 1999	Oxford United	H	2–0	5,328	Yates 57', Grant 63'
R4	30 November 1999	Barnsley	H	4–0	7,039	Parkinson 3', Morgan 45', Hill 56', Black 86'
Quarter final	14 December 1999	Middlesbrough	H	2–1	10,581	Kelly 39', Parkinson 71'
Semi final 1st leg	12 January 2000	Bolton Wanderers	A	1–0	13,303	Hill 22'
Semi final 2nd leg	26 January 2000	Bolton Wanderers	H	3–0	15,864	Henry 5', Mahon 20' (pen), Kelly 70'
Final	27 February 2000	Leicester City	N	1–2	74,313	Kelly 77'

=== FA Cup ===
Round	Date	Opponent	Venue	Result	Attendance	Scorers
R3	11 December 1999	West Ham United	H	1–0	13,629	Henry 21'
R4	8 January 2000	Sunderland	H	1–0	15,468	Allison 25'
R5	29 January 2000	Fulham	A	2–1	13,859	Allison 9', Kelly 70'
Quarter final	20 February 2000	Newcastle United	H	2–3	15,776	Allison 45', G Jones 76'

== Squad ==
Appearances for competitive matches only

Pos.	Name	League		FA Cup		League Cup		Total	
Pos.	Name	Apps	Goals	Apps	Goals	Apps	Goals	Apps	Goals
GK	(Netherlands) John Achterberg	24(2)	0	2	0	6(1)	0	32(3)	0
FW	(England) Paul Aldridge	0(4)	0	0	0	0	0	0(4)	0
DF	(England) Graham Allen	21(3)	0	0	0	4(2)	0	25(5)	0
FW	(England) Wayne Allison	40	16	4	3	0	0	44	19
DF	(Republic of Ireland) Phil Babb	4	0	2	0	1	0	7	0
MF	(England) Michael Black	7(15)	0	0	0	1(4)	1	8(19)	1
DF	(England) Dave Challinor	39(2)	3	4	0	8	0	51(2)	3
DF	(Scotland) Stephen Frail	1(2)	0	0(1)	0	0(3)	0	1(5)	0
MF	(England) Tony Grant	8(1)	0	0	0	1	1	9(1)	1
DF	(England) Reuben Hazell	21(2)	1	3	0	5	0	29(2)	1
MF	(England) Nick Henry	28(2)	1	4	1	6	1	38(2)	3
DF	(England) Clint Hill	28(1)	5	1	0	6	2	39(1)	7
DF	(England) Richard Hinds	5(1)	0	0	0	0	0	5(1)	0
FW	(Canada) Iain Hume	0(3)	0	0	0	0	0	0(3)	0
MF	(England) Gary Jones	27(4)	3	4	1	5	0	36(4)	4
FW	(Wales) Lee Jones	3(11)	0	0	0	1	0	4(11)	0
FW	(England) David Kelly	25(7)	6	3(1)	1	9(1)	8	37(5)	15
MF	(Wales) Jason Koumas	9(14)	2	1	0	2(3)	0	12(17)	2
MF	(Republic of Ireland) Alan Mahon	33(3)	4	3(1)	0	10	1	46(4)	5
MF	(Spain) Pedro Matías	1(4)	0	0	0	0	0	1(4)	0
DF	(Wales) Alan Morgan	20(6)	0	1(2)	0	5	1	26(8)	1
GK	(Republic of Ireland) Joe Murphy	21	0	2	0	4	0	27	0
GK	(England) Eric Nixon	1(1)	0	0	0	0(1)	0	1(2)	0
FW	(England) Andy Parkinson	30(7)	7	4	0	7(3)	2	41(10)	9
DF	(Wales) Gareth Roberts	36(1)	1	3	0	7	0	46(1)	1
DF	(Cape Verde) Georges Santos	9(1)	1	0	0	2	0	11(1)	1
FW	(England) Scott Taylor	23(12)	3	1(3)	0	10	4	34(15)	3
DF	(England) Andy Thompson	10(5)	0	1(1)	0	4(1)	0	15(7)	0
DF	(England) Steve Yates	32(1)	2	1	0	6(1)	1	39(2)	3

== See also ==
- 1999–2000 in English football
