= 1997–98 Tranmere Rovers F.C. season =

Tranmere Rovers
1997–98 season
- Chairman: Frank Corfe
- Manager: John Aldridge (player-manager)
- Stadium: Prenton Park
- First Division: 14th
- FA Cup: Fifth round
- League Cup: Third round
- Top goalscorer: League: Kelly (11); All: Kelly (14)
- Average home league attendance: 7,999
colours

During the 1997–98 English football season, Tranmere Rovers F.C. competed in the Football League First Division.

== Season summary ==
In the 1997–98 season, Tranmere had a poor start to the campaign with just three wins from their opening 14 league games which increased the pressure on player-manager Aldridge and by February were in the relegation zone, two points adrift from safety but then a brilliant run of 6 wins from 10 league games helped Tranmere on their way to escaping the drop.

== Final league table ==
Pos	Team	Pld	W	D	L	GF	GA	GD	Pts
12	Oxford United	46	16	10	20	60	64	−4	58
13	Bradford City	46	14	15	17	46	59	−13	57
14	Tranmere Rovers	46	14	14	18	54	57	−3	56
15	Norwich City	46	14	13	19	52	69	−17	55
16	Huddersfield Town	46	14	11	21	50	72	−22	53

Source: Statto.com
Rules for classification: 1) Points; 2) Goals scored; 3) Goal difference

== Results ==
Tranmere Rovers' score comes first

=== Legend ===
Win	Draw	Loss

=== Football League First Division ===
Date	Opponent	Venue	Result	Attendance	Scorers
9 August 1997	West Bromwich Albion	A	1–2	16,727	Kelly
15 August 1997	Queens Park Rangers	H	2–1	7,467	Kelly, L. Jones
22 August 1997	Manchester City	A	1–1	26,336	L. Jones
30 August 1997	Middlesbrough	H	0–2	12,095	
2 September 1997	Birmingham City	H	0–3	6,620	
7 September 1997	Bury	A	0–1	5,073	
13 September 1997	Swindon Town	A	1–2	6,811	L. Jones
20 September 1997	Reading	H	6–0	5,565	Morrissey, Kelly (2), L. Jones, G. Jones, Thompson
27 September 1997	Crewe Alexandra	A	1–2	4,845	Stevens
4 October 1997	Norwich City	H	2–0	6,674	Kelly, L. Jones
18 October 1997	Nottingham Forest	A	2–2	17,009	L. Jones, Thompson
22 October 1997	Wolverhampton Wanderers	A	1–2	20,841	G. Jones
25 October 1997	Charlton Athletic	H	2–2	5,911	Branch, L. Jones
1 November 1997	Sheffield United	A	1–2	16,578	Kelly
4 November 1997	Huddersfield Town	H	1–0	5,127	Irons
8 November 1997	Port Vale	H	1–2	7,063	Irons
15 November 1997	Bradford City	A	1–0	16,494	Aldridge
22 November 1997	Stoke City	H	3–1	8,009	L. Jones, Aldridge, O'Brien
29 November 1997	Sunderland	A	0–3	26,674	
6 December 1997	Ipswich Town	H	1–1	5,720	L. Jones
13 December 1997	Stockport County	A	1–3	7,903	Aldridge
20 December 1997	Oxford United	H	0–2	5,181	
26 December 1997	Bury	H	0–0	9,146	
28 December 1997	Birmingham City	A	0–0	19,533	
9 January 1998	West Bromwich Albion	H	0–0	8,058	
17 January 1998	Queens Park Rangers	A	0–0	12,033	
31 January 1998	Manchester City	H	0–0	12,830	
4 February 1998	Middlesbrough	A	0–3	29,540	
7 February 1998	Reading	A	3–1	7,069	Irons, Kelly, Branch
10 February 1998	Swindon Town	H	3–0	5,288	Thompson, Branch, Morrissey
18 February 1998	Norwich City	A	2–0	12,105	O'Brien, Kelly
21 February 1998	Crewe Alexandra	H	0–3	7,534	
24 February 1998	Nottingham Forest	H	0–0	7,377	
28 February 1998	Portsmouth	A	0–1	12,250	
4 March 1998	Port Vale	A	1–0	5,465	Kelly
14 March 1998	Huddersfield Town	A	0–3	10,844	
21 March 1998	Bradford City	H	3–1	9,463	Irons, G. Jones, Kelly
28 March 1998	Stoke City	A	3–0	16,692	G. Jones, Mellon, Kelly
3 April 1998	Sunderland	H	0–2	14,116	
7 April 1998	Portsmouth	H	2–2	8,020	G. Jones, Challinor
11 April 1998	Ipswich Town	A	0–0	18,039	
13 April 1998	Stockport County	H	3–0	8,070	G. Jones (2), Mellon
18 April 1998	Oxford United	A	1–1	6,489	Mahon
25 April 1998	Charlton Athletic	A	0–2	15,393	
28 April 1998	Sheffield United	H	3–3	7,526	O'Brien, G. Jones, Parkinson
3 May 1998	Wolverhampton Wanderers	H	2–1	11,144	Aldridge (2, 1 pen)

=== FA Cup ===
Round	Date	Opponent	Venue	Result	Attendance	Goalscorers
R3	13 January 1998	Hereford United	A	3–0	7,473	G. Jones (2), Hill
R4	24 January 1998	Sunderland	H	1–0	14,055	Parkinson
R5	14 February 1998	Newcastle United	A	0–1	36,675	

=== League Cup ===
Round	Date	Opponent	Venue	Result	Attendance	Goalscorers
R1 First Leg	12 August 1997	Hartlepool United	H	3–1	3,878	L. Jones, Morrissey, Kelly
R1 Second Leg	26 August 1997	Hartlepool United	A	1–2 (won 4–3 on agg)	1,626	O'Brien
R2 First Leg	16 September 1997	Notts County	A	2–0	1,779	G. Jones, Kelly
R2 Second Leg	23 September 1997	Notts County	H	0–1 (won 2–1 on agg)	3,287	
R3	14 October 1997	Oxford United	H	1–1 (lost 5–6 on pens)	3,878	Kelly

== Squad ==
Note: Flags indicate national team as defined under FIFA eligibility rules; some limited exceptions apply. Players may hold more than one non-FIFA nationality.

No.	Pos.	Nation	Player
1	GK	(England) ENG	Steve Simonsen
2	DF	(England) ENG	Andy Thompson
3	DF	(England) ENG	John McGreal
4	DF	(England) ENG	Dave Challinor
5	DF	(England) ENG	Gary Stevens
6	MF	(England) ENG	Gary Jones
7	MF	(Republic of Ireland) IRL	Liam O'Brien
8	MF	(England) ENG	Kenny Irons
9	MF	(Scotland) SCO	Micky Mellon
10	FW	(Wales) WAL	Lee Jones
11	FW	(England) ENG	David Kelly
12	MF	(England) ENG	John Morrissey
13	GK	(Wales) WAL	Danny Coyne
14	DF	(England) ENG	Andy Thorn
15	MF	(England) ENG	Graham Branch

No.	Pos.	Nation	Player
16	MF	(Wales) WAL	Alan Morgan
17	DF	(England) ENG	Clint Hill
18	DF	(Poland) POL	Dariusz Kubicki
19	MF	(England) ENG	Paul Cook
20	FW	(England) ENG	Andy Parkinson
21	FW	(Republic of Ireland) IRL	John Aldridge (player-manager)
22	DF	(Scotland) SCO	Stephen Frail
23	MF	(Republic of Ireland) IRL	Alan Mahon
24	MF	(England) ENG	Kevin McIntyre
25	MF	(Wales) WAL	Jason Koumas
26	MF	(Germany) GER	Dirk Hebel
27	MF	(England) ENG	Ryan Williams
28	DF	(England) ENG	Michael Howard
29	MF	(Wales) WAL	Neil Gibson
30	DF	(England) ENG	Gareth Powell
