= 1998–99 Tranmere Rovers F.C. season =

Tranmere Rovers
1998–99 season
- Chairman: Fred Williams
- Manager: John Aldridge
- Stadium: Prenton Park
- First Division: 15th
- FA Cup: Third round
- League Cup: Third round
- Top goalscorer: League: Irons (15); All: Irons (18)
- Average home league attendance: 6,930
colours

During the 1998–99 English football season, Tranmere Rovers F.C. competed in the Football League First Division.

== Season summary ==
In the 1998–99 season, Tranmere started the season poorly and were bottom of the league after failing to win their first 10 league games and by the middle of December, Tranmere were still near the relegation zone with only 4 league wins and the pressure on manager Aldridge increased but a good run of form into the new year with 6 wins from 10 league games eased all of the pressure and lifted them to 13th and saved Tranmere from any relegation worries and they finished a mixed season in 15th place.

== Final league table ==
Pos	Team	Pld	W	D	L	GF	GA	GD	Pts
13	Barnsley	46	14	17	15	59	56	+3	59
14	Crystal Palace	46	14	16	16	58	71	−13	58
15	Tranmere Rovers	46	12	20	14	63	61	+2	56
16	Stockport County	46	12	17	17	49	60	−11	53
17	Swindon Town	46	13	11	22	59	81	−22	50

Rules for classification: 1) Points; 2) Goals scored; 3) Goal difference

== Results ==
Tranmere Rovers' score comes first

=== Legend ===
Win	Draw	Loss

=== Football League First Division ===
Date	Opponent	Venue	Result	Attendance	Scorers
8 August 1998	Wolverhampton Wanderers	A	0–2	20,203	
15 August 1998	Portsmouth	H	1–1	6,714	Mellon
22 August 1998	Sunderland	A	0–5	34,155	
29 August 1998	Bristol City	H	1–1	5,960	Parkinson
8 September 1998	Queens Park Rangers	A	0–0	8,070	
11 September 1998	Huddersfield Town	H	2–3	5,770	Parkinson, Koumas
19 September 1998	Bury	A	0–0	5,030	
25 September 1998	Swindon Town	H	0–0	5,501	
29 September 1998	Ipswich Town	H	0–2	5,072	
3 October 1998	Birmingham City	A	2–2	17,189	Irons, G Jones
10 October 1998	Oxford United	A	2–1	5,862	Allen, G Jones
17 October 1998	Watford	H	3–2	6,753	Irons (2), Mahon
20 October 1998	Barnsley	H	3–0	5,194	Mahon, G Jones, Taylor
24 October 1998	Crewe Alexandra	A	4–1	5,080	Irons, G Jones, Taylor, Mahon
31 October 1998	Stockport County	H	1–1	6,597	Taylor
7 November 1998	Sheffield United	A	2–2	15,844	G Jones, Hill
10 November 1998	Bradford City	H	0–1	6,002	
14 November 1998	Bolton Wanderers	A	2–2	16,564	Irons (2 pens)
21 November 1998	Norwich City	H	1–3	6,319	Irons
28 November 1998	Port Vale	A	2–2	5,216	Allen, Irons
5 December 1998	Grimsby Town	H	1–2	4,937	Hill
8 December 1998	Crystal Palace	A	1–1	12,919	Thompson
12 December 1998	Bolton Wanderers	H	1–1	6,959	Irons
19 December 1998	West Bromwich Albion	A	2–0	13,966	Challinor, Irons (pen)
26 December 1998	Sunderland	H	1–0	14,248	Taylor
28 December 1998	Bradford City	A	0–2	14,076	
8 January 1999	Wolverhampton Wanderers	H	1–2	6,179	Santos
16 January 1999	Bristol City	A	1–1	13,217	Mahon
30 January 1999	Crystal Palace	H	3–1	6,017	L Jones, Allen, Taylor
6 February 1999	Portsmouth	A	1–1	10,597	Taylor
13 February 1999	Queens Park Rangers	H	3–2	5,896	Challinor, L Jones, Allen
20 February 1999	Huddersfield Town	A	0–0	11,411	
27 February 1999	Bury	H	4–0	6,002	Allen, O'Brien, Taylor, Koumas
3 March 1999	Swindon Town	A	3–2	5,765	Taylor, Kelly, Koumas
6 March 1999	Ipswich Town	A	0–1	15,929	
9 March 1999	Birmingham City	H	0–1	7,184	
13 March 1999	Sheffield United	H	2–3	6,588	Hill, Mahon
20 March 1999	Stockport County	A	0–0	7,589	
26 March 1999	Crewe Alexandra	H	3–0	9,359	Taylor, O'Brien, Irons
3 April 1999	Watford	A	1–2	8,682	Kelly
5 April 1999	Oxford United	H	2–2	7,837	Irons (2 pens)
10 April 1999	Barnsley	A	1–1	15,133	Irons
17 April 1999	Norwich City	A	2–2	14,735	Kelly, Hill
24 April 1999	Port Vale	H	1–1	7,770	Mahon (pen)
1 May 1999	Grimsby Town	A	0–1	5,916	
9 May 1999	West Bromwich Albion	H	3–1	10,540	van Blerk (own goal), Irons (pen), Kelly

=== FA Cup ===
Round	Date	Opponent	Venue	Result	Attendance	Goalscorers
R3	2 January 1999	Ipswich Town	H	0–1	7,223	

=== League Cup ===
Round	Date	Opponent	Venue	Result	Attendance	Goalscorers
R1 1st Leg	11 August 1998	Carlisle United	H	3–0	5,116	Irons, Kelly (2)
R1 2nd Leg	18 August 1998	Carlisle United	A	1–0 (won 4–0 on agg)	2,106	Irons (pen)
R2 1st Leg	15 September 1998	Blackpool	A	1–2	3,954	Parkinson
R2 2nd Leg	22 September 1998	Blackpool	H	3–1 (won 4–3 on agg)	5,765	Koumas, L Jones, Irons (pen)
R3	27 October 1998	Newcastle United	H	0–1	12,017	

== Squad ==
Note: Flags indicate national team as defined under FIFA eligibility rules; some limited exceptions apply. Players may hold more than one non-FIFA nationality.

No.	Pos.	Nation	Player
1	GK	(Netherlands) NED	John Achterberg
2	DF	(England) ENG	Graham Allen
3	DF	(England) ENG	Andy Thompson
4	DF	(England) ENG	John McGreal
5	DF	(England) ENG	Clint Hill
6	MF	(England) ENG	Kenny Irons
7	MF	(France) FRA	Georges Santos
8	MF	(Republic of Ireland) IRL	Alan Mahon
9	MF	(Scotland) SCO	Micky Mellon
10	FW	(England) ENG	Scott Taylor
11	FW	(England) ENG	Andy Parkinson
12	DF	(England) ENG	Dave Challinor
13	GK	(Wales) WAL	Danny Coyne
14	FW	(Wales) WAL	Lee Jones
15	MF	(Republic of Ireland) IRL	Liam O'Brien
16	FW	(England) ENG	David Kelly
17	MF	(England) ENG	Gary Jones

No.	Pos.	Nation	Player
18	MF	(Wales) WAL	Jason Koumas
19	FW	(England) ENG	John Morrissey
20	DF	(Scotland) SCO	Stephen Frail
21	GK	(England) ENG	Steve Simonsen
22	MF	(Wales) WAL	Alan Morgan
23	FW	(England) ENG	Craig Russell
24	MF	(England) ENG	Ryan Williams
25	DF	(England) ENG	Richard Hinds
26	MF	(Wales) WAL	Neil Gibson
27	DF	(England) ENG	Ian Sharps
28	FW	(England) ENG	Paul Shepherd (on loan from Leeds United)
29	GK	(Republic of Ireland) IRL	Joe Murphy
30	MF	(England) ENG	Kevin McIntyre
31	DF	(United States) USA	Ian Joy
32	FW	(England) ENG	Perry Taylor
