= 1990–91 Leicester City F.C. season =

1990–91 season of Leicester City

Leicester City
1990–91 season
- Chairman: Terry Shipman (until 29 January 1991); Martin George (from 29 January 1991)
- Manager: David Pleat (until 29 January 1991); Gordon Lee (caretaker from 29 January 1991)
- Second Division: 22nd
- FA Cup: Third round
- League Cup: Second round
- Full Members Cup: First round (Northern Area)
- Top goalscorer: League: Kelly (14); All: Kelly (15)
- Highest home attendance: 19,011 vs Oxford United (11 May 1991, Second Division)
- Lowest home attendance: 4,705 vs Wolves (27 Nov 1990, Full Members Cup)
- Average home league attendance: 11,546

During the 1990–91 English football season, Leicester City F.C. competed in the Football League Second Division.

== Season summary ==
David Pleat oversaw one of Leicester's most unsuccessful periods in its history during the 1990–91 season. He was sacked in January 1991 after a 3–1 defeat at home to Blackburn Rovers left Leicester fourth from bottom. Gordon Lee was put in charge of the club until the end of the season. Leicester won their final game of the season which guided them clear of relegation to the third tier of the Football League at the expense of West Bromwich Albion.

== Final league table ==
Pos	Team	Pld	W	D	L	GF	GA	GD	Pts	Qualification or relegation
20	Watford	46	12	15	19	45	59	−14	51	
21	Swindon Town	46	12	14	20	65	73	−8	50	
22	Leicester City	46	14	8	24	60	83	−23	50	
23	West Bromwich Albion (R)	46	10	18	18	52	61	−9	48	Relegation to the Third Division
24	Hull City (R)	46	10	15	21	57	85	−28	45	Relegation to the Third Division

Rules for classification: 1) Points; 2) Goal difference; 3) Goals scored
(R) Relegated

== Results ==
Leicester City's score comes first

=== Legend ===
Win	Draw	Loss

=== Football League Second Division ===
Date	Opponent	Venue	Result	Attendance	Scorers
25 August 1990	Bristol Rovers	H	3–2	13,648	Kelly, Wright, Alexander (own goal)
28 August 1990	Oldham Athletic	A	0–2	13,099	
1 September 1990	Port Vale	A	0–2	8,840	
8 September 1990	West Ham United	H	1–2	14,605	Mills
15 September 1990	Plymouth Argyle	A	0–2	6,336	
18 September 1990	Blackburn Rovers	A	1–4	5,682	Oldfield
22 September 1990	Sheffield Wednesday	H	2–4	16,156	Oldfield, Kelly
29 September 1990	Middlesbrough	A	0–6	16,178	
3 October 1990	Bristol City	H	3–0	9,815	James, Kelly (2)
6 October 1990	Notts County	H	2–1	13,597	Oldfield, Kelly
13 October 1990	Charlton Athletic	A	2–1	6,000	James, Balmer (own goal)
20 October 1990	Portsmouth	A	1–3	9,286	Mills
24 October 1990	Swindon Town	H	2–2	9,592	Mauchlen, North
27 October 1990	Ipswich Town	H	1–2	11,053	Kelly (pen)
3 November 1990	Oxford United	A	2–2	5,371	Wright, Kelly
10 November 1990	Barnsley	A	1–1	8,581	Wright
17 November 1990	Wolverhampton Wanderers	H	1–0	16,574	Kelly
23 November 1990	Hull City	A	2–5	5,855	North, Reid
1 December 1990	Newcastle United	H	5–4	11,045	Fenwick, Kelly (3, 1 pen), Oldfield
15 December 1990	Bristol Rovers	A	0–0	5,791	
23 December 1990	Watford	H	0–0	16,920	
26 December 1990	Millwall	A	1–2	6,686	Oldfield
1 January 1991	West Bromwich Albion	H	2–1	12,210	Walsh, James
12 January 1991	Port Vale	H	1–1	9,307	Oldfield
19 January 1991	West Ham United	A	0–1	21,652	
26 January 1991	Blackburn Rovers	H	1–3	8,167	Kelly
2 February 1991	Plymouth Argyle	H	3–1	8,172	Wright, Kelly, James
20 February 1991	Brighton & Hove Albion	A	0–3	6,455	
23 February 1991	Barnsley	H	2–1	9,027	James, Peake
2 March 1991	Newcastle United	A	1–2	13,575	Wright
5 March 1991	Wolverhampton Wanderers	A	1–2	15,707	Gibson
9 March 1991	Hull City	H	0–1	8,386	
12 March 1991	Bristol City	A	0–1	13,297	
16 March 1991	Middlesbrough	H	4–3	8,324	Oldfield, Walsh, Russell, Phillips (own goal)
20 March 1991	Charlton Athletic	H	1–2	8,363	Mortimer (own goal)
23 March 1991	Notts County	A	2–0	11,532	Mills, Russell
30 March 1991	Millwall	H	1–2	10,783	Kelly
1 April 1991	Watford	A	0–1	10,078	
6 April 1991	Brighton & Hove Albion	H	3–0	8,444	Wright, Russell, Mills
10 April 1991	Oldham Athletic	H	0–0	11,846	
13 April 1991	West Bromwich Albion	A	1–2	13,991	Russell
20 April 1991	Portsmouth	H	2–1	10,509	Walsh, Russell
24 April 1991	Sheffield Wednesday	A	0–0	31,308	
27 April 1991	Swindon Town	A	2–5	10,404	James, Wright
4 May 1991	Ipswich Town	A	2–3	11,347	Reid, Mills (pen)
11 May 1991	Oxford United	H	1–0	19,011	James

=== FA Cup ===
Round	Date	Opponent	Venue	Result	Attendance	Goalscorers
R3	5 January 1991	Millwall	A	1–2	10,766	James

=== League Cup ===
Round	Date	Opponent	Venue	Result	Attendance	Goalscorers
R2 1st Leg	26 September 1990	Leeds United	H	1–0	13,744	Kelly (pen) 38'
R2 2nd Leg	10 October 1990	Leeds United	A	0–3 (lost 1–3 on agg)	19,090	

=== Full Members Cup ===
Round	Date	Opponent	Venue	Result	Attendance	Goalscorers
NR1	27 November 1990	Wolverhampton Wanderers	H	0–1	4,705	

== Squad ==
Note: Flags indicate national team as defined under FIFA eligibility rules; some limited exceptions apply. Players may hold more than one non-FIFA nationality.

Pos.	Nation	Player
GK	ENG	Carl Muggleton
MF	ENG	Gary Mills
DF	ENG	Rob Johnson
MF	SCO	Ali Mauchlen (captain)
DF	ENG	Steve Walsh
DF	ENG	Alan Paris
MF	SCO	Tommy Wright
FW	ENG	Marc North
MF	ENG	David Oldfield
FW	IRL	David Kelly
DF	ENG	Tony James
MF	ENG	Ricky Hill
MF	ENG	Paul Reid
FW	ENG	Paul Kitson

Pos.	Nation	Player
MF	NIR	Paul Ramsey
GK	ENG	Martin Hodge
DF	ENG	Tony Spearing
GK	ENG	Mike Hooper (on loan from Liverpool)
DF	ENG	Des Linton
FW	ENG	Pat Gavin
DF	ENG	Terry Fenwick (on loan from Tottenham Hotspur)
MF	ENG	Jason Peake
MF	ENG	Colin Gibson
DF	ENG	Lawrie Madden (on loan from Sheffield Wed)
DF	ENG	Richard Smith
FW	ENG	Kevin Russell
MF	ENG	Scott Oakes
MF	ENG	Gary Hyde

=== Left club during season ===
Note: Flags indicate national team as defined under FIFA eligibility rules; some limited exceptions apply. Players may hold more than one non-FIFA nationality.

Pos.	Nation	Player
DF	ENG	Simon Morgan (to Fulham)
MF	SCO	Billy Davies (to Dunfermline Athletic)

Pos.	Nation	Player
GK	ENG	Paul O'Connor (to Nuneaton Borough)
