= Georges Santos =

Footballer (born 1970)

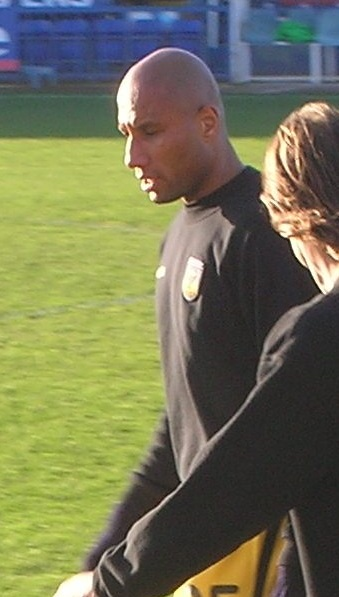
- Santos warming up for Oxford United in 2007

Personal information
- Date of birth: 15 August 1970 (age 56)
- Place of birth: Marseille, France
- Height: 6 ft 3 in (1.91 m)
- Positions: Defender; midfielder

Team information
- Current team: West Ham United (scout)

Senior career*
Years	Team	Apps	(Gls)
1997–1998	Toulon	17	(0)
1998–2000	Tranmere Rovers	47	(2)
2000	West Bromwich Albion	8	(0)
2000–2002	Sheffield United	61	(6)
2002–2003	Grimsby Town	26	(1)
2003–2004	Ipswich Town	34	(1)
2004–2006	Queens Park Rangers	74	(6)
2006–2007	Brighton & Hove Albion	11	(0)
2007	→ Oxford United (loan)	3	(0)
2007	Chesterfield	0	(0)
2007–2008	Alfreton Town	5	(0)
2008	Farsley Celtic	17	(0)
2008–2009	Fleetwood Town	5	(0)
Total		308	(16)

International career
2002–2004	Cape Verde	4	(0)
- * Club domestic league appearances and goals

Georges Santos (born 15 August 1970) is a former professional footballer and club scout for English Championship side West Ham United.

As a player he was a defender and a midfielder in a career that lasted from 1997 to 2009. After moving from French club Toulon, he spent the rest of his playing career in England, notably playing in the Football League for Tranmere Rovers, West Bromwich Albion, Sheffield United, Grimsby Town, Ipswich Town and Queens Park Rangers. Born in France, he was capped four times by Cape Verde.

== Club career ==
=== Tranmere Rovers ===
Santos turned professional with Toulon, before moving to England to join Tranmere Rovers in 1998 who were managed by former Liverpool striker John Aldridge. He made his debut for Rovers on 8 August 1998 in a 2–0 defeat against Wolverhampton Wanderers in the First Division. He went on to make 54 appearances for Rovers, scoring twice between August 1998 and March 2000. After refusing to sign a new contract he was dropped by Aldridge, and as a result missed the 2000 Football League Cup Final, and left the club shortly afterwards.

=== West Bromwich Albion ===
On transfer-deadline day in 1999–2000 he moved to Gary Megson's West Bromwich Albion, where he helped the club preserve their Division One status in a toughly fought relegation battle that saw The Baggies and Grimsby Town scramble out of danger at the expense of Port Vale, Walsall and Swindon Town. After featuring in only 8 games for Albion and after refusing to commit to a long-term deal at Albion, he left the club in the middle of 2000.

=== Sheffield United ===
Georges signed for Albion's league rivals Sheffield United soon after departing from The Hawthorns. Santos was in and out of the Blades team and notched up 68 appearances, with 6 goals scored during his time under Neil Warnock at Bramall Lane. Santos' 2001–02 season with Sheffield United turned out to be a career low point when he was one of three Sheffield United players to be sent off in the notorious Battle of Bramall Lane, a match against his former club West Brom that was abandoned when United's team was cut down to 6 players following three sending-offs and two injuries. With goalkeeper Simon Tracey already off the field, the match had its climax in the 65th minute, when Santos, whom United had just brought on seconds earlier, was sent off for a high two-footed lunging tackle on Andy Johnson; Johnson had previously fractured Santos' cheekbone and seriously damaged his eye socket with a swinging elbow while playing for Nottingham Forest, and this was in fact their first encounter since the incident. The two teams then scuffled on the pitch; in the melee, another United substitute, Patrick Suffo, was sent off for head-butting Derek McInnes. Soon after, United captain Keith Curle was fortunate to avoid a sending off after appearing to throw punches at McInnes. Warnock never selected Santos again, and this was his final appearance as a Sheffield United player.

=== Grimsby Town ===
After remaining without a club until December 2002, Santos joined Grimsby Town, signing a deal until the end of the season. He notably scored his only goal for Grimsby in a 2–0 victory over local rivals and fellow relegation strugglers Sheffield Wednesday, towering above his marker to power home a header from the centre of the penalty area following a Stuart Campbell corner. Santos became a popular figure amongst the club's supporters and he was singled out for a lot of praise despite the club's overall poor form during the season. Initially signed as a midfielder, Santos had been drafted in as a makeshift centre half when Steve Chettle was ruled out for a lengthy period. He was usually paired with Jamaican youngster Simon Ford or player/manager Paul Groves who incidentally this season had adopted playing at centre half in opposed to his regular central midfield sitting. Despite the best efforts of Santos he was unable to help save the Mariners from relegation from the First Division, but went on to be awarded with the Player of the Season award for his stone wall like performances at the back. Despite winning this award and putting himself in the running for club captain for the 2003–04 campaign, Santos rejected a new contract in order to stay in the First Division.

=== Ipswich Town ===
In the summer of 2003 he parted company with Grimsby and joined Joe Royle's Ipswich Town on a three-month contract. He made his debut on 8 August 2003 in the club's 1–1 league draw with Reading He stayed at Portman Road for the entire 2003–04 season, scoring once against Cardiff City, and would go on to make a total of 36 appearances in all competitions.

=== Queens Park Rangers ===
George moved on again, signing a two-year contract at Queens Park Rangers (QPR) in summer 2004. He remained with Rangers for several seasons notching up an impressive 77 appearances, scoring 6 goals for the London-based Loftus Road club. He would depart the club at the end of the 2005–06 season.

=== Brighton & Hove Albion and Chesterfield ===
Santos joined Brighton & Hove Albion in August 2006, turning down an offer to return to former club Grimsby, something he later admitted in an interview as the biggest mistake in his career. Santos played only 12 times for Brighton in all competitions before he joined Oxford United on 5 January 2007 on loan until the end of the 2006–07 season. He was released by Brighton in May 2007.

On 31 August 2007, he joined Chesterfield for a month on non-contract terms, but failed to make an appearance and on 1 November 2007 he left Chesterfield.

=== Alfreton Town, Farsley Celtic and Fleetwood Town ===
On 7 November 2007, Santos went on trial at Rotherham United but failed to impress the staff at Millmoor. He later joined Conference North club Alfreton Town for his first taste of Non-League football.

In January 2008 he moved to Farsley Celtic where he remained for the remainder of the 2007–08 campaign. Despite being an integral part of the first team, Santos left the club only a few weeks into the 2008–09 season.

On 29 September 2008, he joined Fleetwood Town, who would go on to be his last club.

== International career ==
Santos, although born in France, qualified to play for Cape Verde through his parents, who are both originally from the islands. He made his international debut for Cape Verde on 6 September 2002 in an Africa Cup of Nations qualifying match against Mauritania.

== Football scout ==
Santos began working as a European scout for Manchester City in 2013. He went on to scout for RCD Mallorca, Olympique de Marseille and currently West Ham United.

== Career statistics ==
Appearances and goals by club, season and competition
Club	Season	League			FA Cup		League Cup		Other		Total	
Club	Season	Division	Apps	Goals	Apps	Goals	Apps	Goals	Apps	Goals	Apps	Goals
Tranmere Rovers	1998–99	First Division	37	1	1	0	4	0	—		42	1
Tranmere Rovers	1999–00	First Division	10	1	0	0	2	0	—		12	1
Tranmere Rovers	Total		47	2	1	0	6	0	0	0	54	2
West Bromwich Albion	1999–00	First Division	8	0	0	0	0	0	—		8	0
Sheffield United	2000–01	First Division	31	4	1	0	3	0	—		35	4
Sheffield United	2001–02	First Division	30	2	1	0	2	0	—		33	2
Sheffield United	Total		61	6	2	0	5	0	0	0	68	6
Grimsby Town	2002–03	First Division	26	1	1	0	0	0	—		27	1
Ipswich Town	2003–04	First Division	34	1	0	0	2	0	0	0	36	1
Queens Park Rangers	2004–05	Championship	43	5	0	0	2	0	—		45	5
Queens Park Rangers	2005–06	Championship	31	1	1	0	0	0	—		32	1
Queens Park Rangers	Total		74	6	1	0	2	0	0	0	77	6
Brighton & Hove Albion	2006–07	League One	11	0	0	0	1	0	0	0	12	0
Oxford United (loan)	2006–07	Conference Premier	3	0	0	0	—		0	0	3	0
Farsley Celtic	2007–08	Conference Premier	17	0	0	0	—		0	0	17	0
Career total			281	16	5	0	16	0	0	0	302	16

== Honours ==
Individual

- Grimsby Town Player of the Year: 2002–03
