= Gareth Roberts (footballer) =

Welsh footballer

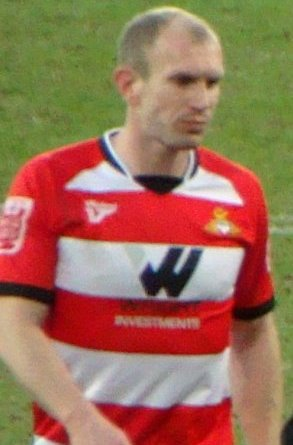
- Roberts playing for Doncaster Rovers

Personal information
- Full name: Gareth Wyn Roberts
- Date of birth: 6 February 1978 (age 48)
- Place of birth: Wrexham, Wales
- Position: Defender

Senior career*
Years	Team	Apps	(Gls)
1994–1999	Liverpool	0	(0)
1999	Panionios	15	(0)
1999	→ Tranmere Rovers (loan)	12	(1)
1999–2006	Tranmere Rovers	271	(11)
2006–2010	Doncaster Rovers	141	(8)
2010–2013	Derby County	96	(1)
2013–2014	Bury	11	(0)
2014	Notts County	6	(0)
2014–2015	Chester	43	(0)
2015–2016	Stockport County	35	(0)
2016–2017	Clitheroe	2	(0)
2017	Skelmersdale United	4	(0)
Total		636	(21)

International career
2000–2005	Wales	9	(0)

Managerial career
- 2016–2017: Clitheroe (player-assistant)
- 2018–2020: Stalybridge Celtic (assistant manager)
- * Club domestic league appearances and goals

Gareth Wyn Roberts (born 6 February 1978) is a Welsh former footballer. He played more than 600 league games in a 22-year career which has taken in eight different clubs, and was capped nine times for Wales. He was part of the Tranmere Rovers side which reached the club's first major cup final in 2000.

== Club career ==
=== Early career ===
Roberts started his career as a trainee at Liverpool and played alongside future England internationals Michael Owen and Jamie Carragher in the 1996 FA Youth Cup winning side, who beat a West Ham United side featuring Frank Lampard and Rio Ferdinand.

Roberts failed to make the grade at Anfield, however, and was released by the club which led to him being signed up by Ronnie Whelan, then manager of Greek side Panionios. His stay in Greece was very brief however, lasting just 15 league games, however he did feature in both of their legs of their Cup Winners Cup quarter final against eventual winners Lazio in March 1999, with Panionios losing 7–0 on aggregate, 4–0 in the home leg and 3–0 in the away leg at the Stadio Olimpico. Roberts returned to England with a loan spell to Tranmere Rovers in August 1999, which became permanent in November the same year.

=== Tranmere Rovers ===
Roberts spent nine years at Prenton Park and made almost 270 league appearances for the club. It was whilst at Tranmere that Roberts came closest to winning a major domestic honour, as he was part of the Tranmere side which reached the club's first ever major cup final, the 2000 Football League Cup Final, where they narrowly lost out 2–1 to Premier League side Leicester City whilst they were still in the second tier. After a midtable finish that campaign, however, Roberts first full season at the club saw Tranmere relegated in bottom place.

After three years of narrowly missing out on the playoffs, Tranmere finished third in the 2004–05 season, seven points from automatic promotion, and lost in the playoff semi finals on penalties to Hartlepool United, who had finished sixth. The club failed to recover from the disappointment, finishing a lowly 18th the following year, their lowest finish in Roberts stay at the club, and he left in July 2006 on a Bosman free transfer to join rival Football League One club Doncaster Rovers. Including his loan spell, Roberts appeared for Tranmere 338 times in all competitions, scoring 12 goals.

=== Doncaster Rovers ===
Roberts won the Football League Trophy in his first season with Doncaster, though he was an unused substitute in the final itself. Roberts also scored his first goal for the Rovers in the final game of the 2006–07 season against Northampton Town – a "quality strike with his left foot, just outside the box." Roberts helped Doncaster earn promotion to the Championship in his second season, playing a key role in Doncaster's season with 36 appearances and 3 goals, including a crucial winner against promotion rivals Nottingham Forest.

Roberts then appeared in all three of Doncaster's playoff games, culminating with a 1–0 victory over Leeds United in the final in front of 75,132; the biggest crowd of Roberts career. Following promotion, Roberts signed a new two-year deal at Doncaster and he played a key role in the Doncaster side that comfortably retained its Championship status over the next two seasons, despite a much smaller budget than some of its rivals.

Roberts appeared in 165 games for Doncaster, with Sean O'Driscoll stating that: "Gareth has actually improved as a player since he has been here and I don't think he would want to go anywhere else by choice, unless he was offered terms we couldn't compete with." This scenario became a possibility when he was linked with a move to Championship rivals Derby County upon the expiration of his contract in the summer of 2010.

Although Doncaster offered Roberts a new deal, he opted to join Derby instead. Of the deal, Doncaster manager Sean O'Driscoll said: "We have done what we can to keep him but we are still far away from what he has been offered. Since we (O'Driscoll and his management team) walked through the door, he has been a first class professional and got better. That is football and I think that he has found the decision difficult and at his age you understand that if he wants to move to pastures new, not to push him away as I would love him to have stayed, you have to be practical."

=== Derby County ===
On 13 May 2010, it was announced that Roberts had agreed to join Derby County on a 2-year deal when his contract with Doncaster was due to expire on 1 July. He was given the number 3 shirt, vacated by the departing left back Jay McEveley and was placed straight into the first team during the club's 2010–11 pre season fixtures.

Roberts made his Rams debut in their 2–1 win over Leeds United at Elland Road in the first game of the 2010/11 season. Roberts started each of Derby's opening five matches before an injury sustained in a 1–0 home defeat to Sheffield United ruled him out for a month. He returned to action in October 2010, playing the full game in a reserves defeat at Rotherham United. Roberts was kept out of the first team by fellow leftback Dean Moxey on his return to availability until he earned a starting spot against Scunthorpe United when Moxey was unavailable due to sickness. Roberts was sent off for two yellow card offences as Derby held on for a 3–2 win.

Moxey was sold to Crystal Palace in January 2011. Roberts then became automatic first choice left-back. Roberts scored his first goal for Derby in a 2–1 win at former club Doncaster Rovers on 17 March 2012. Roberts' contract was extended by a year in April 2012, keeping Roberts at the club until the summer of 2013. Roberts, kept his regular place in the starting at left-back during the start of the 2012–13 season, playing in the first ten games but he missed the game against Brighton & Hove Albion on 6 October 2012 due to a hamstring injury. Clough was hopeful that Roberts would return for the game against Blackburn Rovers on 20 October 2012. Roberts returned to first team action a week later than scheduled, playing 80 minutes against Peterborough United. This game was also the 600th senior club appearance in Roberts career. Impressive performances from Roberts led to Nigel Clough telling his teammates that the 34-year-old Welshman was a perfect role model for the younger players.

Roberts missed two weeks of first team action with a calf injury in December 2012. Upon his return against Bristol City, Derby kept their first clean sheet in seven league games, with Roberts being stated as a major factor in the solid defence, he also provided the assist for the second goal in the 2–0 win. A journalist at the Derby Telegraph rated Roberts as Derby's best left-back since 2002. Roberts was sent off in his 100th appearance for Derby in a 2–1 loss at Hull City, after a dangerous foul on Hull's Nick Proschwitz. Roberts received a three-game ban for the red card.

Ahead of Derby's final game of the season against Millwall; Nigel Clough announced that Derby County would not be renewing the Roberts' contract. Roberts also spent time coaching in Derby County's academy and in an interview stated his desire to continue his playing career in the 2013–14 season. Roberts played the full 90 minutes in the final appearance for the Rams, a game which Derby won 1–0, which was also Roberts first appearance in two months.

=== Bury ===
Most recently, on 27 June 2013, Gareth Roberts signed a 1-year deal at Bury F.C., keeping him at the club until 2014. On 26 July 2013 he was confirmed as Bury's club Captain for the upcoming season.

On 16 January 2014, Gareth had his contract cancelled.

=== Notts County ===
On 31 January 2014, Roberts joined Notts County until the end of the season.

=== Chester ===
Roberts joined Chester on 11 July 2014 on a one-year contract, following his departure from Notts County. Chester did not renew his contract at the end of the season despite making 47 appearances in all competitions.

=== Stockport County ===
Roberts joined Stockport County on 31 May 2015.

=== Clitheroe FC ===
On 13 May 2016, Roberts was appointed as the new assistant manager of Northern Premier League-side Clitheroe. He would also be registered to play for the team.

=== Skelmersdale United ===
Roberts signed for Skelmersdale United in the summer of 2017.

== International career ==
Roberts won the first of his nine caps for Wales as a substitute against Finland in 2000. His last was as a last minute substitute against Slovenia in 2005.

== Career statistics ==
=== Club ===
As of 13 November 2015

Club	Season	League^{[A]}		FA Cup		League Cup		Other^{[B]}		Total	
Club	Season	Apps	Goals	Apps	Goals	Apps	Goals	Apps	Goals	Apps	Goals
Liverpool	1997–98	0	0	0	0	0	0	0	0	0	0
Liverpool	1998–99	0	0	0	0	0	0	0	0	0	0
Liverpool	Total	0	0	0	0	0	0	0	0	0	0
Panionios	1998–99	15	0	0	0	0	0	2	0	17	0
Panionios	Total	15	0	0	0	0	0	2	0	17	0
Tranmere Rovers	1999–2000	37	1	3	0	7	0	0	0	47	1
Tranmere Rovers	2000–01	34	12	3	0	5	0	0	0	42	12
Tranmere Rovers	2001–02	45	2	5	0	3	0	0	0	53	2
Tranmere Rovers	2002–03	37	3	2	0	2	0	3	1	44	4
Tranmere Rovers	2003–04	44	1	7	0	2	0	1	0	54	1
Tranmere Rovers	2004–05	40	3	1	0	2	0	5	1	48	1
Tranmere Rovers	2005–06	44	2	1	0	1	0	3	0	49	2
Tranmere Rovers	Total	281	12	22	0	22	0	12	2	337	14
Doncaster Rovers	2006–07	30	1	3	0	1	0	5	0	39	2
Doncaster Rovers	2007–08	37	3	1	0	2	0	5	0	45	3
Doncaster Rovers	2008–09	32	1	2	0	1	0	0	0	35	1
Doncaster Rovers	2009–10	42	3	2	0	2	0	0	0	46	3
Doncaster Rovers	Total	141	8	8	0	6	0	10	0	165	8
Derby County	2010–11	26	0	1	0	1	0	0	0	28	0
Derby County	2011–12	41	1	2	0	1	0	0	0	44	1
Derby County	2012–13	29	0	2	1	1	0	0	0	32	0
Derby County	Total	96	1	5	0	3	0	0	0	104	1
Bury	2013–14	11	0	0	0	2	0	0	0	13	0
Bury	Total	11	0	0	0	2	0	0	0	13	0
Notts County	2013–14	6	0	0	0	0	0	0	0	6	0
Notts County	Total	6	0	0	0	0	0	0	0	6	0
Chester	2014–15	42	0	4	0	—		1	0	47	0
Chester	Total	42	0	4	0	—	—	1	0	47	0
Stockport County	2015–16	15	0	1	0	—		0	0	16	0
Stockport County	Total	15	0	1	0	—	—	0	0	16	0
Career totals		607	21	40	0	33	0	25	2	705	23

A. The "League" column constitutes appearances and goals (including those as a substitute) in the Super League Greece and the Football League.
B. The "Other" column constitutes appearances and goals (including those as a substitute) in the UEFA Cup Winners' Cup, play-offs, Football League Trophy and the FA Trophy

=== International ===
Wales national team
Year	Apps	Goals
2000	4	0
2004	3	0
2005	2	0
Total	9	0

== Honours ==
Liverpool Youth

- FA Youth Cup: 1995–96

Tranmere Rovers

- Football League Cup runner-up: 1999–2000

Doncaster Rovers

- Football League One play-offs: 2008
- Football League Trophy: 2006–07

Individual

- PFA Team of the Year: 2005–06 Football League One
