= David Kelly (association footballer) =

Footballer (born 1965)

Personal information
- Full name: David Thomas Kelly
- Date of birth: 25 November 1965 (age 60)
- Place of birth: Birmingham, England
- Height: 5 ft 11 in (1.80 m)
- Position: Forward

Youth career
- Bartley Green Boys
- West Bromwich Albion
- Alvechurch
- 1981–1983: Walsall

Senior career*
| Years | Team | Apps | (Gls) |
| 1983–1988 | Walsall | 147 | (63) |
| 1988–1990 | West Ham United | 41 | (7) |
| 1990–1991 | Leicester City | 66 | (22) |
| 1991–1993 | Newcastle United | 70 | (35) |
| 1993–1995 | Wolverhampton Wanderers | 83 | (26) |
| 1995–1997 | Sunderland | 34 | (2) |
| 1997–2000 | Tranmere Rovers | 88 | (21) |
| 2000–2001 | Sheffield United | 35 | (6) |
| 2001–2002 | Motherwell | 19 | (6) |
| 2002 | Mansfield Town | 17 | (4) |
| 2002 | Derry City | 6 | (2) |
| Total | | 606 | (194) |

International career
| 1988–1998 | Republic of Ireland | 26 | (9) |
| 1988–1989 | Republic of Ireland U21 | 3 | (1) |
| 1990 | Republic of Ireland U23 | 1 | (1) |
| 1990–1994 | Republic of Ireland B | 3 | (2) |

Managerial career
- 2017: Port Vale (caretaker)
- * Club domestic league appearances and goals

David Thomas Kelly (born 25 November 1965), also known by the nickname Ned Kelly, is a former Republic of Ireland international footballer and football coach. He scored nine goals in 26 international games for the Republic of Ireland and was a squad member for UEFA Euro 1988, the 1990 FIFA World Cup, and the 1994 FIFA World Cup. A forward, he scored a total of 250 goals in 744 league and cup appearances in a 19-year career in professional football.

As a child, Kelly suffered from Legg–Calvé–Perthes disease but recovered to win a move from non-League Alvechurch and turn professional at Walsall in 1983. He was named in the 1986–87 Third Division PFA Team of the Year. He scored a hat-trick in the 1988 play-off final to secure the club promotion out of the Third Division. He was sold to West Ham United for £600,000 in August 1988 but struggled for form before being sold to Leicester City for half that sum in March 1990. He then moved on to Newcastle United for a fee of £250,000 in December 1991. He helped Newcastle to avoid relegation out of the Second Division in 1991–92 and then win promotion into the Premier League as champions of the newly renamed First Division in 1992–93.

However, he remained in the First Division, having been signed by Wolverhampton Wanderers for a £750,000 fee in June 1993. He top-scored for Wolves in 1994–95 before he was purchased by Sunderland for £900,000 shortly before they won promotion as champions of the First Division at the end of the 1995–96 season. He dropped back into the First Division after joining Tranmere Rovers for £350,000 in 1997 and spent three seasons with Rovers, playing on the losing side of the 2000 League Cup final. Following brief spells with Sheffield United, Motherwell, and Mansfield Town, he finished his career at Derry City, winning the 2002 FAI Cup in his final match as a player.

He remained within football after retiring as a player and went on to coach at Tranmere Rovers, Sheffield United, Preston North End, Derby County, Walsall, Scunthorpe United, Port Vale, Northampton Town, and Forest Green Rovers.

== Club career ==
=== Walsall ===
Kelly was diagnosed with Legg–Calvé–Perthes disease at the age of five, and at one stage his left leg was 4 inches (10 cm) shorter than the right leg, and he was on crutches until the age of ten. He played football for Bartley Green Boys regardless. He was attached to West Bromwich Albion before he was released by Albion. At that stage, he worked as a trolley porter at Cadbury whilst representing the youth team at non-League side Alvechurch. He joined Walsall following a successful trial in 1981, and turned professional at the club under Alan Buckley two years later. He scored three goals in six Third Division games in the 1983–84 season, before winning a regular first-team place in the 1984–85 campaign, scoring 13 goals from 41 appearances. He provided ten goals from 28 league games in the 1985–86 campaign, before his career took off under new manager Tommy Coakley; he top-scored with 26 goals from 55 appearances as the "Saddlers" posted an eighth-place finish in 1986–87, and was named in the Third Division PFA Team of the Year. He then scored 30 goals from 54 matches in the 1987–88 season as Walsall won promotion via the play-offs in 1988; he scored a hat-trick in the replay of the 1988 play-off final as Walsall beat Bristol City to achieve promotion. He went on to have a week-long trial at Bayern Munich but did not join the club despite Uli Hoeneß reportedly comparing him to Denis Law. Bundesliga restricted clubs to just two foreign players. Kelly refused Bayern's offer to sign him and loan him out whilst they looked to offload one of their two foreign players. He scored a total of 82 goals in 190 league and cup appearances throughout five seasons at Fellows Park, and the transfer fee received for him remains a club record.

=== West Ham United ===
His exploits attracted the attention of West Ham United, who signed him for a fee of £600,000 in August 1988. He made his debut in a 4–0 defeat to Southampton. His stay at the Boleyn Ground proved to be largely unsuccessful as an initially promising strike partnership with Leroy Rosenior floundered as he scored only six goals in 25 First Division games as John Lyall's "Hammers" suffered relegation in 1988–89. Kelly also failed to find form for the club under new boss Lou Macari in the Second Division, scoring just two goals in 24 matches of the 1989–90 campaign. Macari restricted him mainly to substitute appearances, and when Macari left the club, his successor, Billy Bonds, allowed Kelly a move away.

=== Leicester City ===
Kelly was sold to David Pleat's Leicester City for a fee of £300,000 in March 1990. He recaptured his form at Filbert Street, scoring seven goals from just ten games in the latter stages of the 1989–90 season. He then top-scored with 15 goals from 48 games to help new "Foxes" boss Gordon Lee avoid relegation out of the Second Division in 1990–91. They mounted a challenge for promotion under the stewardship of Brian Little in 1991–92, though Kelly would leave the club midway through the season.

=== Newcastle United ===
Kelly was signed to Second Division Newcastle United in December 1991 after manager Osvaldo Ardiles agreed a fee of £250,000. He scored 11 league goals for the "Magpies", including the winning goal over Tyne–Wear derby rivals Sunderland, as they avoided relegation in 1991–92. He was then the club's top-scorer with 28 goals from 57 games as Kevin Keegan steered Newcastle to promotion into the Premier League as champions of the First Division. In his final game for United, on the last day of the season against his old club Leicester City, Kelly and new strike-partner Andy Cole both scored hat-tricks in a 7–1 win at St James' Park. He was named as Newcastle United's Player of the Year, but was allowed to leave the club due to the return of Peter Beardsley. Kelly remained a highly popular figure at Newcastle, even commanding a standing ovation upon returning to St James' Park in Sunderland colours.

=== Wolverhampton Wanderers ===
Kelly did not make the move back to the top-flight with Newcastle as he was transferred to First Division side Wolverhampton Wanderers in June 1993 after manager Graham Turner paid £750,000 to secure his services. He hit 14 goals from 44 games in the 1993–94 season, as Wolves posted an eighth-place finish. New manager Graham Taylor then took Wolves to fourth place in 1994–95, with Kelly top-scoring with 22 goals in 54 appearances, breaking Steve Bull's run of eight consecutive seasons as Wolves's top-scorer. However, he lost his first-team place at Molineux to Don Goodman early in the 1995–96 season and requested a transfer.

=== Sunderland ===
He signed a three-year contract with Sunderland after moving in a £900,000 deal in September 1995. However, an ankle injury restricted him to two goals in ten league matches as manager Peter Reid led the "Black Cats" to promotion into the Premier League as champions of the First Division in 1995–96, and he was transfer-listed in the summer. He remained a regular player at Roker Park in the 1996–97 campaign but failed to score a single goal all season, often being used as a right-sided midfielder rather than a striker.

=== Tranmere Rovers ===
Kelly returned to the First Division after securing a £350,000 move to Tranmere Rovers in August 1997. John Aldridge's "Superwhites" managed to secure mid-table finishes in his three seasons at Prenton Park, as he scored 14 goals from 37 games in 1997–98, six goals from 29 matches in 1998–99, and 15 goals from 46 appearances in 1999–2000. He was appointed as club captain soon after joining. He featured prominently in the club's run to the 2000 League Cup final, and scored the consolation goal in a 2–1 loss to former club Leicester City at Wembley Stadium. He was released by Tranmere in July 2000 after failing to agree a new one-year contract.

=== Later career ===
Kelly moved to Neil Warnock's Sheffield United on a free transfer at the start of the 2000–01 season. However, his one season at Bramall Lane was unsuccessful, as he scored just six goals in 35 league games. In June 2001, he turned down a coaching role at United and instead signed a two-year contract with Billy Davies's Motherwell in the Scottish Premier League. He scored seven goals in 21 games for the Steelmen, missing just three matches during his time at Fir Park. However, he was sacked on 15 January 2002 following a bust-up with new manager Eric Black. Two weeks later he accepted an offer of a three-month contract to return to the English league in the Third Division with Mansfield Town. He scored four goals in 17 games as Stuart Watkiss's "Stags" leapfrogged Cheltenham Town in the race for the final automatic promotion place. Kelly left Field Mill after being released in April 2002. He went on to train with Telford United, but rejected the club's offer of a contract. He went on to cross the Irish Sea to join Derry City in July 2002. He made his League of Ireland debut on 1 August. In his final game of professional football, Kelly helped the "Candystripes" to a 1–0 victory over Shamrock Rovers in the 2002 FAI Cup final.

== International career ==
Kelly was born in England but was eligible to play for the Republic of Ireland because his father was born in Dublin. He scored a hat-trick on his debut in a 5–0 win over Israel at Dalymount Park on 10 November 1987, becoming only the fifth player to score a hat-trick for the Republic of Ireland. He went on to score nine goals from 26 international caps, and was selected by manager Jack Charlton in the squads for UEFA Euro 1988, the 1990 FIFA World Cup, and the 1994 FIFA World Cup. He also scored against England in what became known as the Lansdowne Road football riot on 15 February 1995, which was abandoned due to rioting by Combat 18. He was unable to play in the 1998 FIFA World Cup qualification play-off fixture with Belgium after picking up an ankle injury. Belgium won 3–2 on aggregate, and Kelly never represented Ireland again.

== Coaching career ==
After retiring as a footballer, Kelly was appointed as assistant manager to Ray Mathias at Tranmere Rovers in October 2002. He walked out on the club to work as Neil Warnock's assistant at Sheffield United in July 2003, to which Tranmere responded by threatening legal action; United had made a formal approach to Tranmere, but Kelly resigned after Tranmere rejected the approach. He was announced as Billy Davies's assistant at Preston North End in September 2004. He remained at Deepdale after Davies was sacked and replaced by Paul Simpson in June 2006. He was named as assistant manager to Davies at Derby County in July 2007, a few weeks after the club achieved promotion to the Premier League. He left the club just four months later when Davies left the club by mutual consent following a disastrous start to the 2007–08 season.

Kelly followed Davies to Nottingham Forest, again being named as assistant manager in January 2009. He took charge of one game in October 2010 after Davies was absent due to illness. He left Forest along with Davies in June 2011. He returned to former club Walsall as Dean Smith's assistant in January 2013. However, he left the club after nine days to assist Billy Davies, who had been re-appointed as Nottingham Forest manager. He and Davies were sacked by Forest in March 2014, and he settled out of court with the club over alleged unpaid bonuses and for breach of contract. After taking charge at Scunthorpe United in October 2014, Mark Robins appointed Kelly as his assistant. The pair were sacked in January 2016. He was brought in to assist caretaker manager Michael Brown at Port Vale in December 2016. On 16 September 2017, Brown was sacked following seven games without a win, and Kelly and Chris Morgan were installed as caretaker managers. The duo took charge of four games, before departing the club when Neil Aspin was appointed as manager on 4 October. He was appointed as the new development coach at Northampton Town in June 2019. He joined Forest Green Rovers as an assistant to head coach Troy Deeney in December 2023. Kelly left The New Lawn when Deeney was sacked the following month.

== Personal life ==
Kelly has been named in Show Racism the Red Card's Hall of Fame. In the 1990s he started a golf business with his former Walsall manager, Tommy Coakley.

== Career statistics ==
=== Club ===
Appearances and goals by club, season and competition
| Club | Season | League | | | FA Cup | | Other | | Total | |
| Club | Season | Division | Apps | Goals | Apps | Goals | Apps | Goals | Apps | Goals |
|---|---|---|---|---|---|---|---|---|---|---|
| Walsall | 1983–84 | Third Division | 6 | 3 | 0 | 0 | 1 | 0 | 7 | 3 |
| Walsall | 1984–85 | Third Division | 32 | 7 | 3 | 1 | 6 | 5 | 41 | 13 |
| Walsall | 1985–86 | Third Division | 28 | 10 | 2 | 0 | 3 | 0 | 33 | 10 |
| Walsall | 1986–87 | Third Division | 42 | 23 | 6 | 1 | 7 | 2 | 55 | 26 |
| Walsall | 1987–88 | Third Division | 39 | 20 | 3 | 1 | 12 | 9 | 54 | 30 |
| Walsall | Total | | 147 | 63 | 14 | 3 | 29 | 16 | 190 | 82 |
| West Ham United | 1988–89 | First Division | 25 | 6 | 6 | 0 | 8 | 5 | 39 | 11 |
| West Ham United | 1989–90 | Second Division | 16 | 1 | 0 | 0 | 8 | 1 | 24 | 2 |
| West Ham United | Total | | 41 | 7 | 6 | 0 | 16 | 6 | 63 | 13 |
| Leicester City | 1989–90 | Second Division | 10 | 7 | 0 | 0 | 0 | 0 | 10 | 7 |
| Leicester City | 1990–91 | Second Division | 44 | 14 | 1 | 0 | 3 | 1 | 48 | 15 |
| Leicester City | 1991–92 | Second Division | 12 | 1 | 0 | 0 | 5 | 1 | 17 | 2 |
| Leicester City | Total | | 66 | 22 | 1 | 0 | 8 | 2 | 75 | 24 |
| Newcastle United | 1991–92 | Second Division | 25 | 11 | 1 | 0 | 0 | 0 | 26 | 11 |
| Newcastle United | 1992–93 | First Division | 45 | 24 | 4 | 1 | 8 | 3 | 57 | 28 |
| Newcastle United | Total | | 70 | 35 | 5 | 1 | 8 | 3 | 83 | 39 |
| Wolverhampton Wanderers | 1993–94 | First Division | 36 | 11 | 5 | 2 | 3 | 1 | 44 | 14 |
| Wolverhampton Wanderers | 1994–95 | First Division | 42 | 15 | 6 | 4 | 6 | 3 | 54 | 22 |
| Wolverhampton Wanderers | 1995–96 | First Division | 5 | 0 | 0 | 0 | 0 | 0 | 5 | 0 |
| Wolverhampton Wanderers | Total | | 83 | 26 | 11 | 6 | 9 | 4 | 103 | 36 |
| Sunderland | 1995–96 | First Division | 10 | 2 | 1 | 0 | 1 | 0 | 12 | 2 |
| Sunderland | 1996–97 | Premier League | 24 | 0 | 2 | 0 | 2 | 0 | 28 | 0 |
| Sunderland | Total | | 34 | 2 | 3 | 0 | 3 | 0 | 40 | 2 |
| Tranmere Rovers | 1997–98 | First Division | 29 | 11 | 3 | 0 | 5 | 3 | 37 | 14 |
| Tranmere Rovers | 1998–99 | First Division | 27 | 4 | 0 | 0 | 2 | 2 | 29 | 6 |
| Tranmere Rovers | 1999–2000 | First Division | 32 | 6 | 4 | 1 | 10 | 8 | 46 | 15 |
| Tranmere Rovers | Total | | 88 | 21 | 7 | 1 | 17 | 13 | 112 | 35 |
| Sheffield United | 2000–01 | First Division | 35 | 6 | 1 | 0 | 4 | 2 | 40 | 8 |
| Motherwell | 2001–02 | Scottish Premier League | 19 | 6 | 1 | 0 | 1 | 1 | 21 | 7 |
| Mansfield Town | 2001–02 | Third Division | 17 | 4 | 0 | 0 | 0 | 0 | 17 | 4 |
| Derry City | 2002–03 | League of Ireland; Premier Division | 6 | 2 | 4 | 1 | 0 | 0 | 10 | 3 |
| Career total | | | 606 | 194 | 53 | 12 | 95 | 47 | 754 | 253 |

=== International ===
Appearances and goals by national team and year
| National team | Year | Apps | Goals |
|---|---|---|---|
| Republic of Ireland | 1987 | 1 | 3 |
| Republic of Ireland | 1988 | 3 | 1 |
| Republic of Ireland | 1989 | 0 | 0 |
| Republic of Ireland | 1990 | 3 | 1 |
| Republic of Ireland | 1991 | 4 | 2 |
| Republic of Ireland | 1992 | 3 | 0 |
| Republic of Ireland | 1993 | 1 | 0 |
| Republic of Ireland | 1994 | 2 | 0 |
| Republic of Ireland | 1995 | 3 | 1 |
| Republic of Ireland | 1996 | 1 | 0 |
| Republic of Ireland | 1997 | 5 | 1 |
| Total | | 26 | 9 |

=== Managerial ===
Managerial record by team and tenure
| Team | From | To | Matches | Won | Drawn | Lost | Win % | Reference |
|---|---|---|---|---|---|---|---|---|
| Port Vale (caretaker) | 16 September 2017 | 4 October 2017 | 4 | 1 | 1 | 2 | 25.00 | |
| Total | | | 4 | 1 | 1 | 2 | 25.00 | |

== Honours ==
Walsall

- Football League Third Division play-offs: 1988

Newcastle United

- Football League First Division: 1992–93

Sunderland

- Football League First Division: 1995–96

Tranmere Rovers

- Football League Cup runner-up: 1999–2000

Derry City

- FAI Cup: 2002

Individual

- PFA Team of the Year: 1986–87 Third Division

== See also ==
- List of Republic of Ireland international footballers born outside the Republic of Ireland
