= Kevin McIntyre (footballer) =

English footballer (born 1977)

Personal information
- Full name: Kevin McIntyre
- Date of birth: 23 December 1977 (age 48)
- Place of birth: Liverpool, England
- Position: Midfielder

Senior career*
Years	Team	Apps	(Gls)
1996–1999	Tranmere Rovers	2	(0)
1998	→ Barrow (loan)		
1999–2000	→ Doncaster Rovers (loan)	28	(5)
2000–2002	Doncaster Rovers	38	(1)
2002–2004	Chester City	90	(3)
2004–2008	Macclesfield Town	136	(16)
2008–2011	Shrewsbury Town	124	(4)
2011–2012	Accrington Stanley	45	(2)
2012–2013	Rochdale	38	(1)
2013–2014	Chester	32	(0)
2014–2016	Connah's Quay Nomads	52	(0)
Total		585	(32)
- * Club domestic league appearances and goals

Kevin McIntyre (born 23 December 1977, Liverpool) is an English retired footballer who played as a midfielder or left-back.

== Playing career ==
=== Tranmere Rovers & Doncaster Rovers ===
After failing to establish himself with Tranmere Rovers, McIntyre played in the Football Conference from 1998 to 2004 for Doncaster Rovers (originally on loan, later a permanent deal), Barrow (loan) and Chester City, before the latter's promotion in 2003–04 brought a return for both club and player to Football League circles.

=== Macclesfield Town ===
McIntyre was deemed surplus to requirements by Chester, and joined Macclesfield Town in December 2004. He has come back to haunt his former employers by scoring twice in wins against them since, while twice helping Macclesfield avoid relegation out of the Football League on the final day of the season. In May 2007, he signed a fresh two-year deal with the club.

=== Shrewsbury Town ===
On 3 January 2008, he joined Shrewsbury Town for a fee of £50,000. On 17 January 2009, he broke his leg in the 1–1 draw away to Port Vale, keeping him out almost until the end of the season. But he played in the last few games of the season and scored a crucial goal in the 1–0 play-off semi-final against Bury. This meant the game went to extra time and a penalty shootout which Shrewsbury won after Luke Daniels had an excellent game meaning the Shrews went to Wembley Stadium for the second time in three seasons.

McIntyre was almost ever-present in the 2009–10 season, and in May 2010 he signed a one-year contract extension. At this point he was the oldest player at the club, celebrating his 33rd birthday midway through the season. He was released by Shrewsbury on 23 May 2011 after 4 years at the club.

=== Accrington Stanley ===
He signed for Accrington Stanley on 15 July 2011.

=== Rochdale ===
On 2 July 2012, McIntyre signed for Rochdale on a one-year contract after his contract at Accrington Stanley expired.

=== Chester ===
In May 2013, McIntyre returned to Chester to sign for phoenix club Chester FC on a one-year deal.

=== Connah's Quay Nomads ===
On 24 July 2014, McIntyre joined Welsh Premier League side Connah's Quay Nomads after trialling for the club in pre-season. He later took up a role as player-coach at the club, before retiring in 2016, at the age of 38.

== Career statistics ==
As of 2 April 2024

Appearances and goals by club, season and competition
Club	Season	League			National Cup		League Cup		Other		Total	
Club	Season	Division	Apps	Goals	Apps	Goals	Apps	Goals	Apps	Goals	Apps	Goals
Tranmere Rovers	1996–97	First Division	0	0	0	0	0	0	0	0	0	0
Tranmere Rovers	1997–98	First Division	2	0	0	0	0	0	0	0	0	0
Tranmere Rovers	1998–99	First Division	0	0	0	0	0	0	0	0	0	0
Tranmere Rovers	Total		2	0	0	0	0	0	0	0	2	0
Doncaster Rovers (loan)	1999–2000	Football Conference	28	5	1	0	—		3 (Note: Appearance(s) in Conference League Cup)	0	32	5
Doncaster Rovers	2000–01	Football Conference	38	1	0	0	—		2 (Note: Appearance(s) in Football League Trophy)	0	40	1
Doncaster Rovers	2001–02	Football Conference	0	0	0	0	—		0	0	0	0
Doncaster Rovers	Total		66	6	1	0	—		5	0	72	6
Chester City	2002–03	Football Conference	40	2	2	0	—		3 (Note: One appearance in Football League Trophy, two appearances in Football Conference play-offs)	0	45	2
Chester City	2003–04	Football Conference	40	1	1	0	—		1	0	42	1
Chester City	2004–05	League Two	10	0	2	0	1	0	3	0	16	0
Chester City	Total		90	3	5	0	1	0	7	0	103	3
Macclesfield Town	2004–05	League Two	25	0	—		—		2 (Note: Appearance(s) in Football League Two play-offs)	0	27	0
Macclesfield Town	2005–06	League Two	44	5	2	0	1	0	6	0	53	5
Macclesfield Town	2006–07	League Two	44	9	4	1	0	0	1	0	49	10
Macclesfield Town	2007–08	League Two	23	2	1	0	1	0	1	0	26	2
Macclesfield Town	Total		136	16	7	1	2	0	10	0	155	17
Shrewsbury Town	2007–08	League Two	22	2	—		—		0	0	22	2
Shrewsbury Town	2008–09	League Two	26	0	1	0	1	0	7 (Note: Four appearances and two goals in Football League Trophy, three appearances and one goal in League Two play-offs)	3	35	3
Shrewsbury Town	2009–10	League Two	45	1	1	0	1	0	1	0	48	1
Shrewsbury Town	2010–11	League Two	31	1	1	0	1	0	2	0	35	1
Shrewsbury Town	Total		124	4	3	0	3	0	10	3	140	7
Accrington Stanley	2011–12	League Two	45	2	1	0	1	0	2	0	49	2
Rochdale	2012–13	League Two	38	1	2	0	1	0	2	0	43	1
Chester	2013–14	Conference Premier	32	0	1	0	—		2 (Note: One appearance in FA Trophy, one appearance in Cheshire Senior Cup)	0	35	0
Connah's Quay Nomads	2014–15	Welsh Premier League	30	0	1	0	1	0	1 (Note: Appearance(s) in Welsh Premier League UEFA Europa League play-offs)	0	33	0
Connah's Quay Nomads	2015–16	Welsh Premier League	22	0	3	0	3	0	2	0	30	0
Connah's Quay Nomads	Total		52	0	4	0	4	0	3	0	63	0
Career total			585	32	24	1	12	0	41	3	662	36

== Honours ==
=== Club ===
Doncaster Rovers

- Conference League Cup (2): 1998–99, 1999–2000

Chester City

- Football Conference (1): 2003–04
