= Steve Simonsen =

English footballer (born 1979)

Personal information
- Full name: Steven Preben Arthur Simonsen
- Date of birth: 3 April 1979 (age 47)
- Place of birth: South Shields, England
- Height: 6 ft 2 in (1.88 m)
- Position: Goalkeeper

Youth career
- 1994–1996: Nottingham Forest

Senior career*
Years	Team	Apps	(Gls)
1996–1998	Tranmere Rovers	35	(0)
1998–2004	Everton	30	(0)
2004–2010	Stoke City	166	(0)
2010	→ Sheffield United (loan)	7	(0)
2010–2012	Sheffield United	89	(0)
2012–2013	Preston North End	10	(0)
2013	Dundee	8	(0)
2013–2015	Rangers	20	(0)
2015–2016	Pune City	10	(0)
Total		375	(0)

International career
1999	England U21	4	(0)
- * Club domestic league appearances and goals

Steven Preben Arthur Simonsen (born 3 April 1979) is an English former professional footballer who played as a goalkeeper. He started his senior career at Tranmere Rovers before spells with Everton, Stoke City and Sheffield United, Preston North End and Scottish sides Dundee and Rangers. Whilst at Tranmere, he received four caps for the England U21s.

== Club career ==
=== Early career ===
Born in South Shields, Tyne and Wear, Simonsen grew up a supporter of Sunderland but was spotted by Nottingham Forest at the age of 15 whilst playing in his native South Shields. After a spell in Nottinghamshire, however, he was released in the summer of 1996.

=== Tranmere Rovers ===
After being released by Nottingham Forest, Simonsen started his career at Tranmere Rovers in August 1996 as a trainee. By November 1996, he had already made his league debut for the club against one of the clubs he would later sign for, Stoke City. After just 42 league and cup appearances for the first team, he was bought by Everton. Both clubs were under the control of Peter Johnson at the time. It was reported by various media bodies that the transfer fee was worth £3.3 million, a record fee for a goalkeeper. However Tramere Rovers' officially sanctioned Complete Record book states that this a myth and that the deal "was based on staged payments depending upon appearances, Everton's future success and international caps, none of which came" and that "Rovers never saw anymore than the initial £1m down payment."

=== Everton ===
Simonsen struggled to make it into the Everton first team on a regular basis, only making the starting line-up 35 times with another two substitute appearances, in his five seasons at Goodison Park. His Everton debut did not come until the 1999–2000 season, a League Cup tie against Oxford United. In July 2001, Simonsen was also rumoured to be involved in a transfer to Wigan Athletic, but the deal fell through. In December 2001, Simonsen even considered making a move to a Danish club.

Simonsen did not get a chance to prove himself again until the 2001–02 season, when he made 25 league starts for Everton and finally became a regular first team player. Following the appointment of new manager David Moyes, however, Simonsen rarely got a chance to play for Everton again, making only three league starts during his last two seasons. Simonsen later rejected a one-year contract extension and was thus released by the club in May 2004. After his release, Simonsen was linked with the recent-relegated side Leeds United.

=== Stoke City ===
Simonsen signed for Stoke City in July 2004 on a free transfer and was the club's first choice goalkeeper until 2008, making more than 150 league appearances for the Potters. Simonsen was named as Stoke City players' player of the season for the 2004–05 season and was rewarded with a new three-year contract until July 2008. During the 2006–07 season, Simonsen became the record holder for most consecutive clean sheets at Stoke City – seven – a feat he also achieved at Tranmere. The clean sheets consisted of four home matches and three away matches.

In July 2007, Simonsen signed a new contract with Stoke keeping him at the club until June 2010. On the first day of the following season he saved a Steven MacLean penalty in a 1–0 win over Cardiff City. He went on to play an important part in Stoke's promotion to the Premier League, although he lost his place in the side towards the end of the campaign, when Carlo Nash was brought in on an emergency loan from Wigan Athletic. Thomas Sørensen was then signed at the start of the 2008–09 season, so Simonsen played second fiddle to the Danish international throughout the year. He played only when Sørensen was injured, which amounted to just five appearances. The 2009–10 season started in the same manner for Simonsen until an injury to Sørensen at home to Chelsea meant that Simonsen made his first appearance of the season.

With their first choice keeper Paddy Kenny suspended and previous loanee goalkeeper Mark Bunn being recalled to Blackburn Rovers, Simonsen signed a one-month loan deal with Sheffield United in March 2010. He made his début the following day against Doncaster Rovers, conceding an early goal in a match that finished 1–1. Simonsen made seven starts for the Blades before returning to Stoke at the end of his loan period.

With his contract expiring, Simonsen left Stoke in July of that year on a free transfer after spending six years at City and making almost 200 appearances in total.

=== Sheffield United ===
Released from his contract at Stoke, Simonsen returned to Bramall Lane and signed a two-year contract with Sheffield United in July 2010. He was virtually ever present in his first full season at the club but the team suffered a torrid time as they went through four managers and were eventually relegated to League One. Simonsen remained first choice keeper for the Blades for much of the following season as an improved side contested an immediate promotion back to the Championship although ultimately finished in third place, going on to lose in the play-off final on penalties to Huddersfield Town with Simonsen missing the decisive kick. After missing the penalty, Simonsen told BBC Radio Sheffield missing the penalty was his lowest part of his career and described this as "horrendous", in addition he mentioned it a million times in his head that he couldn't watch the moment.

With the club needing to cut the wage bill, Simonsen was released a few days later when his contract expired. Simonsen previously stated he wanted a new contract to stay at the club.

=== Preston North End ===
In August 2012, Simonsen signed a one-year contract with Preston North End. Simonsen made his debut for the club, replacing first-choice goalkeeper Thorsten Stuckmann, on 18 September 2012, where Simonsen kept a clean sheet, as Preston defeated Hartlepool United 5–0. Manager Graham Westley praised Simonsen on his debut. After making 17 appearances, Simonsen sustained an injury against Coventry City the following January ruling him out of action for several months, after which he was released from his Preston contract.

=== Dundee ===
In March 2013, Simonsen signed a short-term contract with Scottish Premier League club Dundee until the end of the season. His move caused a rift between first choice goalkeeper Robert Douglas and Manager John Brown. Simonsen made his debut, in the Dundee derby, which ended 1–1. Towards the end of the season, with Dundee facing relegation, Simonsen was the club's first choice goalkeeper. Dundee were relegated after a draw with Aberdeen on 5 May 2013. Despite the relegation, Brown praised his performance and stated he would love Simonsen to stay for a further season. However, Simonsen's time with Dundee was ended when he was not offered a further deal, having stayed at the club for two months.

=== Rangers ===
On 13 September 2013, Scottish League One side Rangers announced that Simonsen had signed a contract until the end of the 2013–14 season. He previously went on the trial with the club in mid-August.

Simonsen was the back-up goalkeeper to Cammy Bell until making his debut for Rangers on 20 January against Forfar, where he won praise for an outstanding reflex save during a 2–0 win for Rangers. Simonsen's only other first team appearance that season for Rangers was in their Scottish Cup semi-final tie against Dundee United, where Simonsen's misplaced kick-out led directly to Dundee United's third goal in a 3–1 defeat for the Ibrox club. After the match, Manager Ally McCoist said he has no sympathy to Simonsen following criticism was directly made to him. Simonsen later described this as "cruel moment". Despite on 3 May, Rangers players made history by becoming the first Rangers side in 115 years to go an entire league season unbeaten after a 1–1 draw with Dunfermline during which they clinched the Scottish League One championship. Following the end of the season, he was part of a young Rangers squad that featured in the HKFC International Soccer Sevens held in May.

Simonsen was due to leave Rangers at the end of the 2013–14 season, however he re-signed in July 2014 for the following campaign. He made his first start of the 2014–15 season in an 8–1 victory at Ibrox against Clyde in the Scottish Challenge Cup. Simonsen became a second goalkeeper for the club following Bell's injury and went on to make thirty-three appearances in all competitions, including being in goal when Rangers faced rival's Celtic for the first time in three years in the Scottish League Cup semi-final, which Rangers lost 2–0. His second season at Rangers was proven to be controversial when he charged for betting. Simonsen received a two-match ban, though one man was suspended. There were criticism to Simonsen's suspension made by SFA, as it was too lightly and too lenient. As a result, SFA was considering to extending Simonsen's suspension, an action was criticised by PFA Scotland. The SFA's attempts to extend Simonsen's suspension was rejected.

As a result of ban, Simonsen feared that the betting incident could see his future ruined. Eventually, Simonsen was released by Rangers at the end of the season, along with several other players, after the club failed to gain promotion to the Scottish Premiership.

=== FC Pune City ===
Simonsen was signed by Indian Super League club FC Pune City on 20 July 2015 for the 2015 Indian Super League.

== International career ==
Simonsen appeared for the England Under 21s, winning four caps. The son of a Danish seaman, he is eligible to represent Denmark at international level.

== Personal life ==
Simonsen was married to Claire Simonsen, a former presenter on Radio City 96.7, who now co-presents the breakfast show on In Demand Radio Alongside Lee Butler and Gemma cutting. Together, the couple have two children Micheal and Melodie.

In April 2014, Simonsen was fined, and banned from driving for twelve months. Around that time, Simonsen and his wife were in process of divorce and up until now, "Simonsen has no previous record and is a man of previous good character". Upon being charged for betting, Simonsen's action were revealed when his wife was declared bankrupt after having a debt of £22,000 and cited the bankruptcy over "reduction in household income" and "relationship breakdown."

== Career statistics ==
Appearances and goals by club, season and competition
Club	Season	League			FA Cup		League Cup		Other		Total	
Club	Season	Division	Apps	Goals	Apps	Goals	Apps	Goals	Apps	Goals	Apps	Goals
Tranmere Rovers	1997–98	First Division	30	0	3	0	0	0	—		33	0
Tranmere Rovers	1998–99	First Division	5	0	0	0	4	0	—		9	0
Tranmere Rovers	Total		35	0	3	0	4	0	—		42	0
Everton	1998–99	Premier League	0	0	0	0	0	0	—		0	0
Everton	1999–2000	Premier League	1	0	2	0	0	0	—		3	0
Everton	2000–01	Premier League	1	0	0	0	0	0	—		1	0
Everton	2001–02	Premier League	25	0	5	0	0	0	—		30	0
Everton	2002–03	Premier League	2	0	0	0	0	0	—		2	0
Everton	2003–04	Premier League	1	0	0	0	0	0	—		1	0
Everton	Total		30	0	7	0	0	0	—		37	0
Stoke City	2004–05	Championship	31	0	1	0	1	0	—		33	0
Stoke City	2005–06	Championship	45	0	4	0	1	0	—		50	0
Stoke City	2006–07	Championship	46	0	2	0	1	0	—		49	0
Stoke City	2007–08	Championship	36	0	2	0	0	0	—		38	0
Stoke City	2008–09	Premier League	5	0	1	0	4	0	—		10	0
Stoke City	2009–10	Premier League	3	0	1	0	3	0	—		7	0
Stoke City	Total		166	0	11	0	10	0	—		187	0
Sheffield United	2009–10	Championship	7	0	0	0	0	0	—		7	0
Sheffield United	2010–11	Championship	45	0	1	0	1	0	—		47	0
Sheffield United	2011–12	League One	44	0	4	0	2	0	4 (Note: One appearance in Football League Trophy and three appearances in the League One play-offs)	0	54	0
Sheffield United	Total		96	0	5	0	3	0	4	0	108	0
Preston North End	2012–13	League One	10	0	2	0	2	0	3 (Note: Appearances in Football League Trophy)	0	17	0
Dundee	2012–13	Scottish Premier League	8	0	0	0	0	0	0	0	8	0
Rangers	2013–14	Scottish League One	2	0	1	0	0	0	0	0	3	0
Rangers	2014–15	Scottish Championship	18	0	2	0	5	0	3 (Note: Appearances in Scottish Challenge Cup)	0	28	0
Rangers	Total		20	0	3	0	5	0	3	0	31	0
Pune City	2015	Indian Super League	10	0	—		—		—		10	0
Career total			375	0	31	0	24	0	10	0	440	0

== Honours ==
Stoke City

- Football League Championship runner-up: 2007–08
