= Gary Fitzpatrick =

English footballer

Personal information
- Date of birth: 5 August 1971 (age 55)
- Place of birth: Birmingham, England
- Position: Midfielder

Youth career
- Leicester City

Senior career*
Years	Team	Apps	(Gls)
	Leicester City	1	(0)
- VS Rugby
- Moor Green
- IFK Rannberg
- Hednesford Town
- Telford United
- Nuneaton Borough
- Telford United
- Rushall Olympic
- * Club domestic league appearances and goals as of 11:58, 12 February 2012 (UTC)

Gary Fitzpatrick (born 5 August 1971) is a former professional footballer who played as a midfielder.

== Career ==
Born in Birmingham, Fitzpatrick went to school in Kings Norton, before he started his football career as a youngster with Leicester City, but played just one Football League game for them against Sheffield United before he was released at the age of 19. After he was released, he joined VS Rugby, but moved onto Moor Green because of the travel from his home. He was given a two-week trial in Sweden with IFK Rannberg, where he ended up signing as the club's professional and stayed for nine months. Fitzpatrick returned to England when he was offered a contract with Hednesford Town and a trial with Football League side Port Vale, and signed for the former team. Fitzpatrick spent five years with Hednesford, helping them on an FA Cup run which included victories against Blackpool and York City. He moved onto Telford United where he played more than 100 games. When manager Alan Lewer left for Nuneaton Borough, Fitzpatrick followed him before he returned to the reformed A.F.C. Telford United.

Fitzpatrick is also a PE teacher at The Phoenix Collegiate in West Bromwich.
