= Alan Paris =

English footballer

Personal information
- Date of birth: 15 August 1964 (age 62)
- Place of birth: Slough, England
- Height: 5 ft 11 in (1.80 m)
- Position: Right back

Youth career
- Slough Town

Senior career*
Years	Team	Apps	(Gls)
1982–1985	Watford	0	(0)
1985–1988	Peterborough United	137	(2)
1988–1991	Leicester City	88	(3)
1991–1992	Notts County	42	(1)
1996	Stevenage Borough	1	(0)
- Slough Town
Total		267	(6)

Managerial career
- 2017–2018: Burnham
- 2018–: Langley
- * Club domestic league appearances and goals

Alan Paris (born 15 August 1964) is an English former professional footballer who played as a right back, making over 250 career appearances.

== Playing career ==
Born in Slough, Paris played for Slough Town, Watford, Peterborough United, Leicester City, Notts County and Stevenage Borough.

== Managerial career ==
In October 2017, Paris was appointed manager of Hellenic Premier Division side Burnham. He left the role in February 2018. In the summer of 2018 he was appointed manager of Langley having previously been working with the club's youth system.

== Honours ==
Notts County

- Football League Second Division play-offs: 1991

Individual

- PFA Team of the Year: 1986–87 Fourth Division
