= Paul Aldridge =

English footballer

Personal information
- Date of birth: 2 December 1981 (age 44)
- Place of birth: Liverpool, England
- Position: Forward

Senior career*
Years	Team	Apps	(Gls)
1999–2002	Tranmere Rovers	6	(0)
2002–2003	Macclesfield Town	1	(0)
- * Club domestic league appearances and goals

Paul Aldridge (born 2 December 1981) is an English footballer who played in The Football League for Tranmere Rovers and Macclesfield Town. His father John was his manager whilst he was at Tranmere.
