= Marc North =

English footballer

Personal information
- Full name: Marc Victor North
- Date of birth: 29 May 1966
- Place of birth: Ware, England
- Date of death: 25 September 2001 (aged 35)
- Place of death: Southend-on-Sea, England
- Height: 5 ft 10 in (1.78 m)
- Position: Forward

Youth career
- Luton Town

Senior career*
Years	Team	Apps	(Gls)
1985–1987	Luton Town	18	(3)
1984–1985	→ Lincoln City (loan)	4	(0)
1986	→ Scunthorpe United (loan)	5	(2)
1987	→ Birmingham City (loan)	5	(1)
1987–1989	Grimsby Town	67	(17)
1989–1991	Leicester City	71	(9)
1991–1992	Grimsby Town	1	(0)
1992	Boston United	1	(1)
1992–1993	Kettering Town	13	(6)
Total		185	(39)
- * Club domestic league appearances and goals

Marc Victor North (29 May 1966 – 25 September 2001) was an English professional footballer who played as a striker from 1985 to 1993.

He notably played for Leicester City and had two spells with Grimsby Town as well as appearing for Luton Town, Lincoln City, Scunthorpe United, Birmingham City, Boston United and Kettering Town.

== Playing career ==
North was born in Ware, Hertfordshire. He came up through the youth ranks at Luton Town where he spent two years at the club. During that time he was loaned out to Lincoln City, Scunthorpe United and Birmingham City.

He finally got his big break playing under Alan Buckley at Grimsby Town. While at Grimsby he was remembered for coming off the subs bench to score twice in an FA Cup tie with Middlesbrough. His performances soon earned him a move to Leicester City in 1989. He left Filbert Street in 1991 after a mixed time at the club. His next move was to return to Grimsby Town on non-contract terms; he only featured in one game. He played out his career in the Conference with Boston United and Kettering Town before retiring.

== Death ==
North was diagnosed with lung cancer in February 2001 and died from complications on 25 September 2001.
