= Jason Koumas =

Welsh footballer (born 1979)

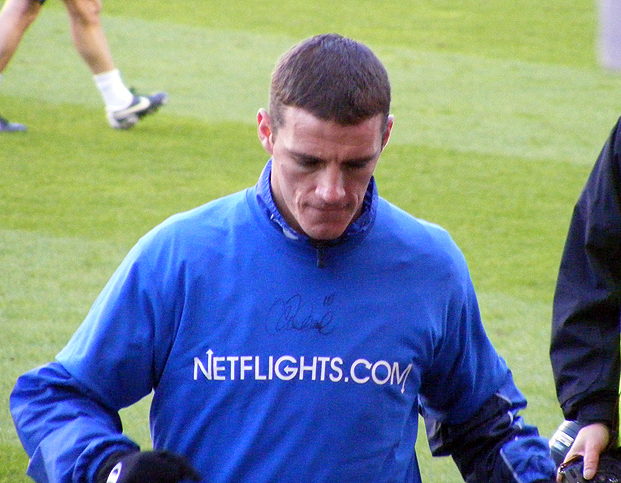
- Koumas warming up for Wigan Athletic in 2007

Personal information
- Full name: Jason Koumas
- Date of birth: 25 September 1979 (age 47)
- Place of birth: Wrexham, Wales
- Height: 5 ft 8 in (1.73 m)
- Position: Attacking midfielder

Youth career
- –1997: Liverpool
- 1997–1998: Tranmere Rovers

Senior career*
Years	Team	Apps	(Gls)
1998–2002	Tranmere Rovers	127	(25)
2002–2007	West Bromwich Albion	123	(23)
2005–2006	→ Cardiff City (loan)	44	(12)
2007–2011	Wigan Athletic	54	(2)
2010–2011	→ Cardiff City (loan)	23	(2)
2013–2015	Tranmere Rovers	51	(4)
Total		422	(68)

International career
2001–2009	Wales	34	(10)
- * Club domestic league appearances and goals

Jason Koumas (Greek: Τζέισον Κούμας; born 25 September 1979) is a Welsh former professional footballer who played as a midfielder for Tranmere Rovers, Cardiff City, West Bromwich Albion and Wigan Athletic, as well as the Wales national team.

He was selected in both the 2005–06 and 2006–07 Football League Championship team of the season.

On 12 May 2016, Leon Barton wrote in a long blog post for The Guardian that Koumas's talent - often described as "mercurial" - was no less than Steven Gerrard's, but described him as undisciplined.

== Club career ==
=== Early career ===
Born in Wrexham to an English mother and Greek-Cypriot father, Koumas played for local youth sides during his primary school years, before joining the Liverpool Academy aged nine. Koumas played regularly alongside players such as Steven Gerrard and Michael Owen and was highly rated by the club. However, he did not sign Youth Training Scheme forms with the club, reportedly due to coaching staff refusing to play him in his preferred central midfield position, instead opting to join Tranmere Rovers.

=== Tranmere Rovers ===
Koumas made his professional debut for Tranmere Rovers in the 1998–99 season. A series of impressive performances over the next four years won him many plaudits, including a place in the PFA Division Two Team of the Year for 2001–02. Koumas established himself as a talented youngster with immense potential. He scored one of Tranmere's goals when they knocked out Merseyside rivals Everton in the 2000–01 FA Cup in a memorable 3–0 victory at Goodison Park. In August 2002, this potential was spotted by then West Bromwich Albion manager, Gary Megson, who paid Rovers a fee of £2.25 million to secure his services.

=== West Bromwich Albion ===
A successful first season at Premier League level, including sensational solo goals against Manchester United and Blackburn Rovers, saw Koumas win the club's Player of the Season award. However, this was not enough to prevent Albion from suffering relegation back to the Football League.

Koumas inspired West Brom's promotion back to the Premier League in the 2003–04 season. He won the First Division Player of the Month award for November 2003, scoring three league goals in the month, including a double in a 3–0 win at Nottingham Forest. On 18 April 2004, Koumas scored a last minute goal in a vital 1–0 win against fellow promotion chasers Sunderland, which essentially sealed Albion's return to the Premier League. Koumas finished the season with ten league goals as West Brom finished runners-up and was subsequently named in the First Division PFA Team of the Year. In the summer of 2004, Koumas signed a new contract with Albion, but during the following season fell out with new boss Bryan Robson. Robson stated that he was "disappointed" with Koumas' attitude and placed him on the transfer list.

==== Loan to Cardiff City ====
At the start of the 2005–06 season, Koumas was loaned out to Cardiff City. This move proved an immediate success, with Koumas coming off the bench to score on his debut against Leeds United. Throughout the remainder of the season, Koumas consistently turned in man-of-the-match winning performances, scoring 13 times in 44 appearances from midfield, including a hattrick away at Luton in a pulsating victory. Koumas earned himself hero status amongst the Bluebirds faithful as well as the club's Player of the Year award and a place in the Championship's PFA Team of the Season.

Cardiff City then attempted to negotiate a transfer fee for Koumas before the start of the 2006–07 season, however they failed to come to an agreement with West Brom. Koumas was effectively on strike throughout the negotiations and refused to return to the Hawthorns, even resorting to training on his own away from the club. On 23 August, Koumas made a U-turn in his West Bromwich Albion career by signing a new three-year deal at the club.

==== Return to West Brom ====
His club career was then rejuvenated under new manager Tony Mowbray, becoming a first team regular again and putting in several man of the match performances during the 2006–07 season. He won the Powerade Championship player of the month award for December 2006. Koumas was named the Championship Player of the Year at the Football League Awards in March 2007, and was also honoured in April with a place in the Championship PFA Team of the Year. Despite the individual accolades, Koumas was unable to help West Brom achieve promotion following a defeat to Derby in the 2007 Football League Championship play-off final.

=== Wigan Athletic ===
In July 2007, West Brom agreed a fee of £5.3 million with Wigan Athletic, stating that it was a head-turning offer. Koumas completed the move to Wigan on 10 July. Tranmere received a portion of the transfer fee having previously included a sell-on clause in their agreement with West Brom. He made his Wigan debut on 11 August 2007 in a 2–1 defeat away at Everton. The following month he marked his 300th career league appearance by scoring his first goal for his new club, converting an 80th-minute penalty to rescue a 1–1 home draw with Fulham. Due to injury and a lack of first team opportunities under three different managers during his three years at Wigan, Koumas was linked with a return to previous club West Bromwich Albion along with Newcastle United and Leicester City on a loan deal until the end of the 2009–10 season, however a loan move never materialised. Koumas was released at the end of 2010–11 season following his return from a loan period at Cardiff City.

==== Second loan to Cardiff City ====
On 5 August 2010, Koumas agreed a deal to re-join Cardiff City on a season-long loan, but was unable to complete the move until after Cardiff's transfer embargo was lifted. The following day, the club's transfer embargo was lifted and Koumas was able to register with the club two days prior to the start of the 2010–11 season. Koumas made his second Cardiff City debut in the 4–0 home victory over Doncaster Rovers, coming on as a late substitute for Craig Bellamy. Koumas' second stint at the Bluebirds was severely hampered with injuries and further niggley setbacks. Cardiff needed a win to keep the pressure on second placed Norwich and to keep automatic promotion alive. With it 1–1 at the Keepmoat Stadium in the 87th minute, Cardiff boss Dave Jones sent Koumas on. Within 3 minutes of his arrival he curled a 25-yard free-kick into the top left hand corner. Koumas then finished the game by passing the ball past the Doncaster keeper to make it 3–1.

=== Return to Tranmere Rovers ===
After being released by Wigan in 2011, Koumas remained as a free agent and considered his playing career. It was revealed by BBC on 8 July 2013 that Koumas asked to train with former club Tranmere Rovers as he attempted to rebuild his footballing career. After a successful trial, he signed a one-year deal on 1 August. On 23 May 2014, Koumas signed a one-year extension.

Koumas announced his retirement on 10 July 2015.

== International career ==
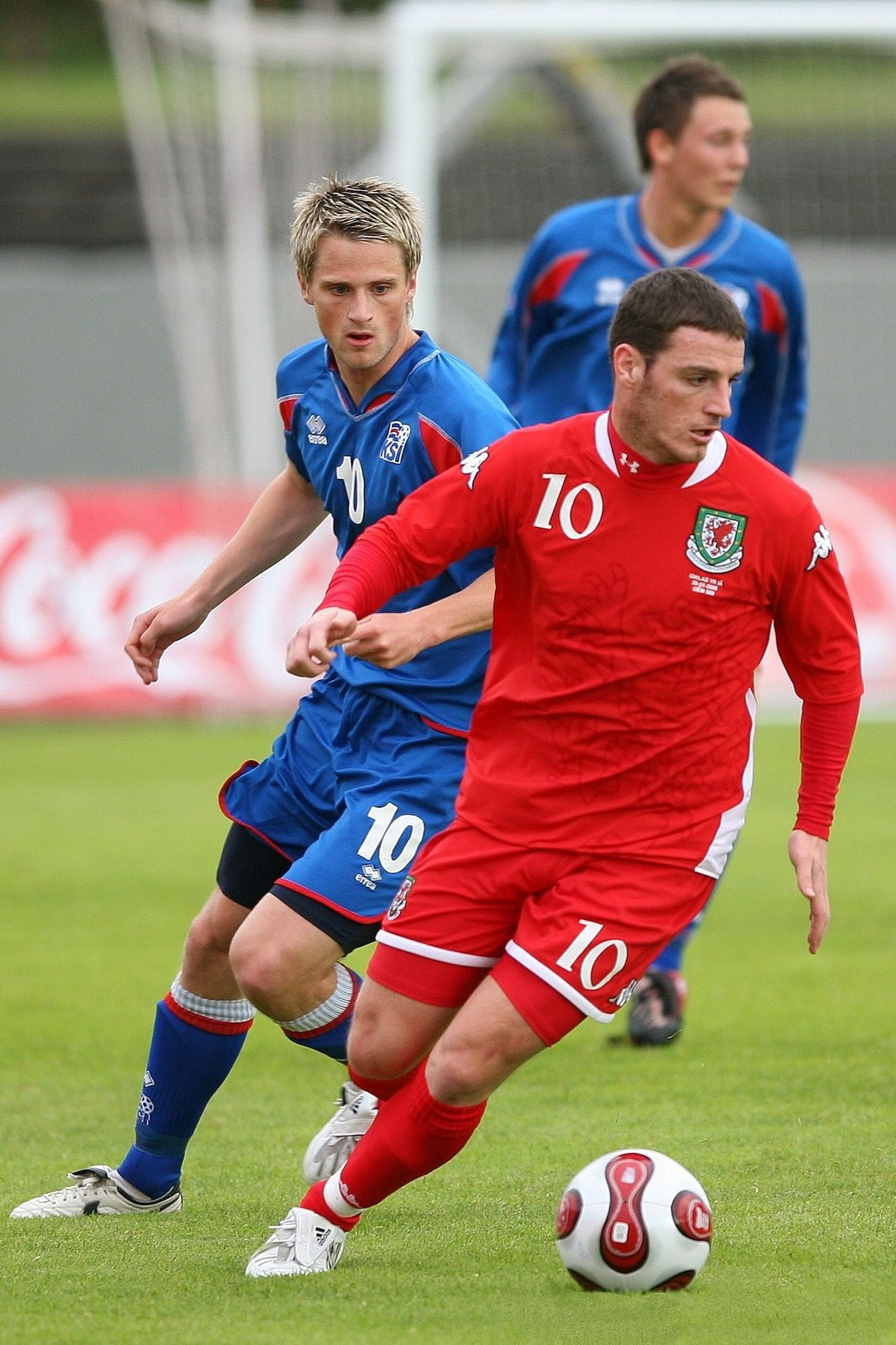
Koumas (red) and Gunnar Heiðar Þorvaldsson (blue) during international match between Iceland and Wales

Born in Wrexham to a Greek Cypriot father and an English mother, Koumas was eligible to play for Cyprus, England and Wales. When he received call ups for both Cyprus and Wales, he opted for the latter. Koumas played 34 times for his country, making his international debut against Ukraine in 2001. He was part of Mark Hughes's national team which narrowly missed out on qualification for Euro 2004, losing 1–0 to Russia in the play-offs.

His international career was blighted by his persistent failure to turn up to training. In May 2006, he pulled out of a squad get-together in San Sebastián. He came back onto the international scene with three goals in two matches, one in a 3–1 win against Cyprus in October 2006 and two in a 4–0 win in November 2006 against Liechtenstein.

Koumas captained his country for the first time on 1 June 2008, as Wales lost 2–0 to the Netherlands. He missed a penalty for Wales in a World Cup qualifier against Azerbaijan. Koumas retired from international football on 6 September 2009, having scored ten goals in 34 caps. His final appearance for Wales was in a 2–0 defeat to Finland on 28 March 2009.

== Personal life ==
Koumas' son, Lewis, also came through the Liverpool Academy, and made his pro-debut with the club in February 2024.

== Career statistics ==
=== Club ===
As of match played 2 May 2015.

Appearances and goals by club, season and competition
Club	Season	League			FA Cup		League Cup		Other		Total	
Club	Season	Division	Apps	Goals	Apps	Goals	Apps	Goals	Apps	Goals	Apps	Goals
Tranmere Rovers	1998–99	First Division	23	3	—		4	1	—		27	4
Tranmere Rovers	1999–2000	First Division	23	2	1	0	5	0	—		29	2
Tranmere Rovers	2000–01	First Division	39	10	4	1	4	0	—		47	11
Tranmere Rovers	2001–02	Second Division	38	8	4	4	1	1	—		43	13
Tranmere Rovers	2002–03	Second Division	4	2	—		—		—		4	2
Tranmere Rovers	Total		127	25	9	5	14	2	0	0	150	32
West Bromwich Albion	2002–03	Premier League	32	4	2	0	1	0	—		35	4
West Bromwich Albion	2003–04	First Division	42	10	1	0	3	0	—		46	10
West Bromwich Albion	2004–05	Premier League	10	0	2	0	1	0	—		13	0
West Bromwich Albion	2006–07	Championship	39	9	4	0	1	0	3 (Note: Appearances in Championship play-offs)	0	47	9
West Bromwich Albion	Total		123	23	9	0	6	0	3	0	141	23
Cardiff City (loan)	2005–06	Championship	44	12	—		3	1	—		47	13
Wigan Athletic	2007–08	Premier League	30	1	2	0	1	0	—		33	1
Wigan Athletic	2008–09	Premier League	16	0	—		2	0	—		18	0
Wigan Athletic	2009–10	Premier League	8	1	2	0	—		—		10	1
Wigan Athletic	Total		54	2	4	0	3	0	0	0	61	2
Cardiff City (loan)	2010–11	Championship	23	2	—		2	0	2	0	27	2
Tranmere Rovers	2013–14	League One	31	4	1	0	2	0	—		34	4
Tranmere Rovers	2014–15	League Two	20	0	1	1	1	0	1 (Note: Appearance in Football League Trophy)	0	23	1
Tranmere Rovers	Total		51	4	2	1	3	0	1	0	57	5
Career total			422	68	24	6	31	3	6	0	483	77

=== International ===
As of match played 28 March 2009.

Appearances and goals by national team and year
National team	Year	Apps	Goals
Wales	2001	1	0
Wales	2002	1	0
Wales	2003	6	0
Wales	2004	6	1
Wales	2005	2	0
Wales	2006	4	3
Wales	2007	5	3
Wales	2008	8	3
Wales	2009	1	0
Total		34	10

List of international goals scored by Jason Koumas
No.	Date	Venue	Opponent	Score	Result	Competition
1.	31 March 2004	Ferenc Puskas Stadium, Budapest, Hungary	Hungary	1–1	2–1	Friendly
2.	11 October 2006	Millennium Stadium, Cardiff, Wales	Cyprus	1–0	3–1	UEFA Euro 2008 qualifying
3.	14 November 2006	Racecourse Ground, Wrexham, Wales	Liechtenstein	1–0	4–0	Friendly
4.	14 November 2006	Racecourse Ground, Wrexham, Wales	Liechtenstein	2–0	4–0	Friendly
5.	28 March 2007	Millennium Stadium, Cardiff, Wales	San Marino	3–0	3–0	UEFA Euro 2008 qualifying
6.	17 November 2007	Millennium Stadium, Cardiff, Wales	Republic of Ireland	1–0	2–2	UEFA Euro 2008 qualifying
7.	17 November 2007	Millennium Stadium, Cardiff, Wales	Republic of Ireland	2–2	2–2	UEFA Euro 2008 qualifying
8.	6 February 2008	Racecourse Ground, Wrexham, Wales	Norway	2–0	3–0	Friendly
9.	6 February 2008	Racecourse Ground, Wrexham, Wales	Norway	3–0	3–0	Friendly
10.	20 August 2008	Liberty Stadium, Swansea, Wales	Georgia	1–0	1–2	Friendly

== Honours ==
Tranmere Rovers

- Football League Cup runner-up: 1999–2000

West Bromwich Albion

- Football League First Division runner-up: 2003–04

Individual

- PFA Team of the Year: 2001–02 Second Division, 2003–04 First Division, 2005–06 Championship, 2006–07 Championship
- Football League Championship Player of the Year: 2006–07
