= 2000 Football League Cup final =

- Match programme cover
- Event: 1999–2000 Football League Cup
Leicester City	Tranmere Rovers
2	1
- Date: 27 February 2000
- Venue: Wembley Stadium, London
- Man of the Match: Matt Elliott (Leicester City)
- Referee: Alan Wilkie (Durham)
- Attendance: 74,313

The 2000 Football League Cup final was played between Leicester City, in their third final appearance in four years, and First Division side Tranmere Rovers at Wembley Stadium on 27 February 2000. It was the 34th and last League Cup final to be played at the original Wembley Stadium. Leicester won 2–1 to become the last team to win the League Cup at the old Wembley.

== Road to the final ==
=== Leicester City ===
Round 2, 1st leg: Crystal Palace 3–3 Leicester City

Round 2, 2nd leg: Leicester City 4–2 Crystal Palace

Round 3: Leicester City 2–0 Grimsby Town

Round 4: Leicester City 0–0 Leeds United (Leicester won 4–2 on penalties)

Quarter-final: Leicester City 3–3 Fulham (Leicester won 3–0 on penalties)

Semi-final, 1st leg: Aston Villa 0–0 Leicester City

Semi-final, 2nd leg: Leicester City 1–0 Aston Villa

=== Tranmere Rovers ===
Round 1, 1st leg: Blackpool 2–1 Tranmere Rovers

Round 1, 2nd leg: Tranmere Rovers 3–1 Blackpool

Round 2, 1st leg: Tranmere Rovers 5–1 Coventry City

Round 2, 2nd leg: Coventry City 3–1 Tranmere Rovers

Round 3: Tranmere Rovers 2–0 Oxford United

Round 4: Tranmere Rovers 4–0 Barnsley

Quarter-final: Tranmere Rovers 2–1 Middlesbrough

Semi-final, 1st leg: Bolton Wanderers 0–1 Tranmere Rovers

Semi-final, 2nd leg: Tranmere Rovers 3–0 Bolton Wanderers

== Match summary ==
Scott Taylor's successful tackle on Robbie Savage forced the ball out for a corner, and Matt Elliott headed home Leicester's first goal courtesy of a Steve Guppy cross from the right. Leicester came close to scoring a second goal in the 60th minute when Emile Heskey passed the ball to an unmarked Muzzy Izzet in the penalty box, who hesitated and his shot flew wide of the goal. Referee Alan Wilkie later suffered an injury in the right leg in the 62nd minute, and was stretchered off. Phil Richards, the fourth official, was brought on to replace him.

Clint Hill picked up his second booking and was sent off after a deliberate foul on Heskey in the 63rd minute. Several Tranmere players protested but the decision stood. Tranmere, down to ten men, rallied and their persistence paid off when they equalised in the 77th minute when a fine header found its way to an unmarked David Kelly who, after narrowly escaping Matt Elliott's attempted tackle, shot low to the left past goalkeeper Tim Flowers. Yet, just three minutes later, Elliott scored another towering header from another Guppy corner kick from the right, and the League Cup went to Leicester.

== Match details ==
27 February 2000
15:00 GMT

Leicester City	2–1	Tranmere Rovers
Elliott 29', 81'	Report	Kelly 77'

Wembley Stadium, London
Attendance: 74,313
Referee: Alan Wilkie (Durham)

Leicester City	Tranmere Rovers

GK	1	(England) Tim Flowers
CB	18	(Scotland) Matt Elliott (c)
CB	3	(Jamaica) Frank Sinclair
CB	4	(Northern Ireland) Gerry Taggart
RM	6	(Turkey) Muzzy Izzet
CM	29	(England) Stefan Oakes		(substituted off) 77'
CM	14	(Wales) Robbie Savage	Yellow card
CM	7	(Northern Ireland) Neil Lennon
LM	11	(England) Steve Guppy
CF	27	(England) Tony Cottee		(substituted off) 89'
CF	9	(England) Emile Heskey
Substitutes:
GK	22	(France) Pegguy Arphexad
DF	15	(England) Phil Gilchrist
MF	37	(Greece) Theodoros Zagorakis
MF	24	(England) Andy Impey		(substituted on) 77'
FW	20	(England) Ian Marshall		(substituted on) 89'
Manager:
(Northern Ireland) Martin O'Neill

GK	13	(Republic of Ireland) Joe Murphy
RB	30	(England) Reuben Hazell
CB	5	(England) Dave Challinor	Yellow card
CB	6	(England) Clint Hill	(yellow card) 9' (red card) 63'
LB	33	(Wales) Gareth Roberts
RM	14	(England) Andy Parkinson		(substituted off) 66'
CM	15	(England) Gary Jones
CM	11	(England) Nick Henry
LM	7	(Republic of Ireland) Alan Mahon
CF	9	(Republic of Ireland) David Kelly (c)
CF	10	(England) Scott Taylor
Substitutes:
GK	1	(Netherlands) John Achterberg
DF	31	(England) Steve Yates		(substituted on) 66'
DF	3	(England) Andy Thompson
FW	16	(Wales) Alan Morgan
FW	29	(England) Michael Black
Manager:
(Republic of Ireland) John Aldridge

Man of the Match:
Matt Elliott (Leicester City)

Assistant referees:
Paul Armstrong (Berkshire)
Wendy Toms
Fourth official:
Phil Richards (Lancashire)

Match rules

- 90 minutes.
- 30 minutes of extra-time if necessary.
- Penalty shoot-out if scores still level.
- Five named substitutes.
- Maximum of three substitutions.
