= Andy Parkinson =

English footballer (born 1979)

Personal information
- Full name: Andrew John Parkinson
- Date of birth: 27 May 1979 (age 47)
- Place of birth: Liverpool, England
- Height: 5 ft 8 in (1.73 m)
- Position: Attacking midfielder

Team information
- Current team: Tranmere Rovers (First Team Coach)

Youth career
- 1995–1997: Liverpool

Senior career*
| Years | Team | Apps | (Gls) |
| 1997–2003 | Tranmere Rovers | 164 | (18) |
| 2003–2004 | Sheffield United | 7 | (0) |
| 2004 | → Notts County (loan) | 5 | (3) |
| 2004 | → Notts County (loan) | 9 | (0) |
| 2004–2006 | Grimsby Town | 85 | (12) |
| 2006–2008 | Notts County | 68 | (5) |
| 2008–2010 | Cambridge United | 27 | (2) |
| 2010 | Gateshead | 14 | (0) |
| 2010–2011 | Accrington Stanley | 18 | (2) |
| 2011–2012 | Aberystwyth Town | 32 | (2) |
| 2012–2015 | Prestatyn Town | 61 | (36) |
| Total | | 490 | (80) |

Managerial career
- 2015–2018: Tranmere Rovers (Youth Team)
- 2020: Tranmere Rovers (Joint caretaker)
- 2021: Tranmere Rovers (assistant caretaker)
- 2026: Tranmere Rovers (caretaker)
- * Club domestic league appearances and goals

Andrew John Parkinson (born 27 May 1979) is an English former professional footballer and youth team manager of Tranmere Rovers.

As a player he was a forward, attacking midfielder and winger from 1997 to 2015. He played for Tranmere Rovers where he featured in the 2000 Football League Cup final, he went on to play for Sheffield United, Notts County, Grimsby Town, Cambridge United, Gateshead and Accrington Stanley before finishing his carree in the Welsh Premier League with spells at Aberystwyth Town and Prestatyn Town.

== Playing career ==
=== Tranmere Rovers ===
A pacy winger, Parkinson began as a Liverpool trainee, winning the FA Youth Cup in 1996, but was released shortly after. He signed for Tranmere Rovers who were managed by former Liverpool striker John Aldridge. He was handed his professional debut on 22 October 1997 when he came on as an 81st-minute substitute for John Morrisey in a 2–1 defeat against Wolverhampton Wanderers. Parkinson settled into Rovers first team squad with the club plying their trade in the second tier of English football. During 2000 and 2001 he featured in two cup runs, which eventually saw him play a part in the 2000 Football League Cup final, where Tranmere lost out to Leicester City in the final at Wembley Stadium. He memorably scored twice, including a last minute winner in extra time, to help Tranmere knock Premier League side Leeds United out of the 2000–01 Football League Cup. He played his final game for the club on 22 March 2003 against Peterborough United before departing Prenton Park at the end of the 2002–2003 season.

=== Sheffield United ===
Parkinson moved to Neil Warnock's Sheffield United in July 2003, making his debut on 9 August 2003 in a 0–0 draw with Gillingham. He struggled to hold down a first team place at Bramall Lane and was made available for loan. He was then signed by Notts County for two separate loan spells before having his contract terminated by mutual consent at United in May 2004.

=== Grimsby Town ===
In July 2004 he became one of Russell Slade's first signings as Grimsby Town manager, where he played his first season for The Mariners mainly in attack where he partnered Michael Reddy. His 9 league goals during the 2004–2005 season were enough for him to make him the club's top scorer. During the 2005–2006 campaign Slade preferred to push Parkinson out to a wide left position on the wing, whilst Reddy was partnered by Gary Jones in attack. He was involved in the club's League Cup run where they saw off Derby County before beating Tottenham Hotspur 1–0 where Parkinson's corner was hit in on the half volley by Jean-Paul Kalala. Town were eventually beaten in the third round by Newcastle United, and by the end of the season they had found themselves in a Play-off spot, but lost out in the Football League Two final to Cheltenham Town.

=== Notts County ===
Parkinson rejected a fresh contract with Grimsby in the summer of 2006 and opted to return to Notts County where he had previously spent two loan spells during the 2003–2004 season. Parkinson remained at Meadow Lane for two seasons, and he was eventually released when his two-year contract expired.

=== Cambridge United ===
Parkinson signed for Cambridge United on 2 July 2008 on a free transfer after being released by Notts County at the end of the 2007–08 season and quickly established himself as a fan favourite. In a pre-season fixture against Everton he scored two goals, one of which was a lob over the goalkeeper from the edge of the area on the turn. However, he injured his anterior cruciate ligament in training in the days following his first appearance for Cambridge and was ruled out for the rest of the 2008–09 season. However, he made an exceptional recovery and returned to the first team squad in March 2009 as a substitute in Cambridge's 2–0 home win against Burton Albion. He later paid tribute to the work and skill of Greg Reid, the Cambridge United physio, for the speed and quality of his recovery. Parkinson was part of the Cambridge squad that suffered defeat to Torquay United in the 2009 Conference Premier Play Off final at Wembley. He had his contract with Cambridge United terminated by mutual consent on 1 February 2010. Parkinson signed for Gateshead on 16 February 2010, making his debut the same day against Barrow. Parkinson was released by Gateshead at the end of the 2009–10 season.

=== Accrington Stanley ===
He joined Accrington Stanley for the 2010/11 season. On 23 May 2011 it was announced that he would be released at the end of June 2011 when his current contract expired.

=== Aberystwyth Town ===
In August 2011 after a trial with Barrow AFC, he moved to Aberystwyth Town.

=== Prestatyn Town ===
In July 2012 he joined Prestatyn Town. Where he struck up a great goal scoring partnership with Jason Price as Prestatyn found themselves near the top of the table. At the end of his first season with the north Wales club he helped them lift the Welsh cup for the first time in their history, scoring a free kick in a 3–1 win after extra time against 8-time winners Bangor City.Parkinson made his European debut in July 2013 as Prestatyn defeated Latvians Lepajas Metalurgs in the Europa League 1st qualifying round.

== Coaching career ==
Parkinson was appointed Youth Team manager of Tranmere Rovers in late 2015.. In 2018, following the clousure of the Youth Team, Parkinson became a coach for the first team. In 2020, Parkinson had a spell as joint caretaker manager of Tranmere until the appointment of Keith Hill. In 2026, Parkinson again had a spell as caretaker manager of Tranmere.

== Honours ==
Liverpool Youth

- FA Youth Cup: 1996

Tranmere Rovers

- Football League Cup runner-up: 1999–2000

Prestatyn Town

- Welsh Cup: 2013
