= Scott Taylor (footballer, born 1976) =

English footballer

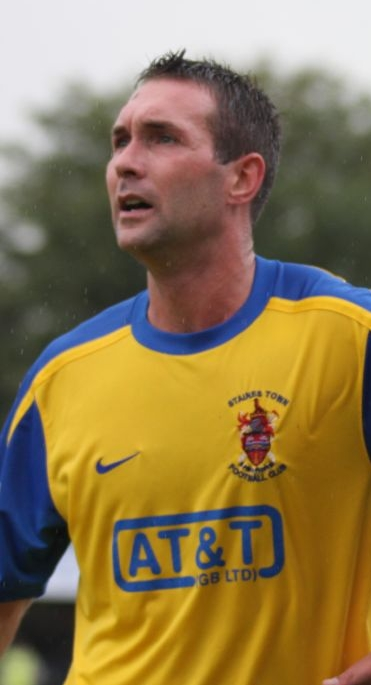
- Taylor playing for Staines Town in 2010.

Personal information
- Full name: Scott James Taylor
- Date of birth: 5 May 1976 (age 50)
- Place of birth: Chertsey, Surrey, England
- Height: 5 ft 10 in (1.78 m)
- Position: Striker

Senior career*
Years	Team	Apps	(Gls)
1994–1995	Staines Town	33	(?)
1995–1996	Millwall	28	(0)
1996–1998	Bolton Wanderers	12	(1)
1997–1998	→ Rotherham United (loan)	10	(3)
1998	→ Blackpool (loan)	6	(2)
1998–2001	Tranmere Rovers	107	(17)
2001–2002	Stockport County	27	(4)
2002–2004	Blackpool	116	(43)
2004–2006	Plymouth Argyle	34	(4)
2006–2008	Milton Keynes Dons	50	(5)
2007	→ Brentford (loan)	6	(0)
2007	→ Rochdale (loan)	4	(0)
2008	Grays Athletic	19	(3)
2008	Lewes	19	(5)
2008–2010	Staines Town	?	(?)
- * Club domestic league appearances and goals as of 07:23, 25 September 2008 (UTC)

Scott James Taylor (born 5 May 1976) is an English football coach and former professional footballer.

As a player, he was a striker who notably played in the Premier League for Bolton Wanderers. He also played in the Football League for Millwall, Rotherham United, Blackpool, Tranmere Rovers, Stockport County, Plymouth Argyle, Milton Keynes Dons, Brentford and Rochdale. He played in non-league football with Grays Athletic and Lewes. He later had a spell with Staines Town where he was also the club's assistant manager.

== Playing career ==
Taylor started his professional career at Millwall where he played 28 games before being signed by Bolton for £150,000 in March 1996. Taylor failed to break into the Bolton side and only managed to score three goals in all competitions. One of these goals came in the memorable 6–1 League Cup win over Premier League side Tottenham Hotspur, when Bolton were in the second tier. After loan spells at Rotherham United and Blackpool, he signed for Tranmere Rovers in October 1998 for a fee of £350,000. Taylor played over 100 games for Tranmere in almost three years and played the full 90 minutes in the 2000 Football League Cup Final before signing for Stockport County on a free transfer in July 2001.

His stay at Stockport was short lived, and he signed for Blackpool, this time on a permanent deal, in January 2002. It was at Blackpool that Taylor enjoyed the most successful part of his career to date, scoring 61 goals in all competitions in a two-year spell. In 2002 he started and scored in the final as Blackpool won the 2001–02 Football League Trophy. His goalscoring record resulted in a £100,000 transfer to Championship side Plymouth Argyle. "I had a great time at Blackpool," he said shortly after the move south. "I got on really well with the fans and, whatever anyone says, was sad to go. It was because of serious issues in my personal life at the time, and it was forced upon me. Things are finally looking up now and I hope both us and Blackpool stay up – I certainly think with Simon Grayson in charge they will beat the drop."

Taylor failed to establish himself at Home Park and moved to Milton Keynes Dons in January 2006. On 11 February 2006, he scored against Blackpool during a 3–0 victory for the Dons.

On 8 March 2007, Taylor signed for Brentford in a one-month loan deal. He made six appearances (three as a substitute) without scoring, before returning to MK Dons at the end of the loan spell. He then went out on loan again to Rochdale in late 2007.

Grays Athletic announced on 18 January 2008 that, Taylor signed for the Blues until the end of the 2007–08 season. The striker's first goals for the club came on his third appearance, in the form of a hat-trick in the Conference League Cup against Welling United, on 29 January 2008.

On 7 July 2008, it was confirmed Taylor had signed for Conference National newcomers Lewes. Manager Kevin Keehan told BBC Southern Counties Radio: "He's a very intelligent footballer and brings other people into the game. "He will create as well as score. I couldn't be happier we've signed him."

On 28 November, Taylor was released from his contract at Lewes and re-signed for former club Staines Town.

On 2 May 2009, Taylor came on as a substitute and scored the only goal of Staines Town's Isthmian League Premier Division play-off final against Carshalton Athletic. Taylor came on and scored in extra time after Staines goalkeeper Louis Wells saved a penalty in normal time to clinch promotion to the Conference South.

== Personal life ==
Taylor is a trainee electrician, since turning to part-time football.

== Honours ==
Bolton Wanderers

- Football League First Division: 1996–97

Tranmere Rovers

- Football League Cup runner-up: 1999–2000

Blackpool

- Football League Trophy: 2001–02, 2003–04

Staines Town

- Isthmian Premier Division play offs: 2009

Individual

- PFA Team of the Year: 2003–04 Second Division
