= Lee Jones (footballer, born 1973) =

Welsh footballer and coach

Personal information
- Full name: Philip Lee Jones
- Date of birth: 29 May 1973 (age 53)
- Place of birth: Wrexham, Wales
- Height: 5 ft 8 in (1.73 m)
- Position: Forward

Team information
- Current team: Wealdstone (assistant manager)

Youth career
- –1990: Lex XI

Senior career*
Years	Team	Apps	(Gls)
1991–1992	Wrexham	39	(10)
1992–1997	Liverpool	3	(0)
1993	→ Crewe Alexandra (loan)	8	(1)
1996	→ Wrexham (loan)	20	(8)
1997	→ Wrexham (loan)	6	(0)
1997	→ Tranmere Rovers (loan)	8	(5)
1997–2000	Tranmere Rovers	77	(11)
2000–2002	Barnsley	40	(5)
2002–2004	Wrexham	49	(14)
2004–2006	Caernarfon Town	63	(24)
2012–2013	Prestatyn Town	35	(9)

International career^{‡}
1992–1996	Wales Under-21	14	(?)
	Wales B	1	(?)
1997	Wales	2	(0)

Managerial career
- 2006: Caernarfon Town (Joint Caretaker)
- 2011–2012: Prestatyn Town
- 2015: Wrexham (Joint Caretaker)
- 2016–2017: Tranmere Rovers Academy
- * Club domestic league appearances and goals as of 12:00, 28 November 2008 (UTC) ‡ National team caps and goals as of 12:00, 30 March 2007 (UTC)

Philip Lee Jones (born 29 May 1973) is a Welsh football coach and former player who played as a forward.

== Career ==
Born in Wrexham, he began his career with his hometown club. In March 1992, he moved to Liverpool, aged 18. However, he only managed four appearances in five years, in part due to suffering two broken legs. He was loaned out to Crewe Alexandra, twice back to Wrexham, and finally to Tranmere Rovers where he scored five goals in eight games. Tranmere signed Jones for £100,000 in June 1997. He spent three years with Tranmere before being released in May 2000. In July, he moved to First Division club Barnsley on a free transfer, but in 2002 he returned to Wrexham for a fourth spell.

In the summer of 2004 he was released, subsequently joining League of Wales side Caernarfon Town. After a brief spell as joint-caretaker manager at Caernarfon (with Kenny Irons), he signed for the NEWI Cefn Druids in November 2006.

He joined Prestatyn Town for a spell that included both playing and as the team's manager from March 2011.

== International career ==
Jones has represented Wales at Youth, Under-21 and B level, and he also won two caps for the senior side.

== Coaching career ==
He had a brief spell as joint caretaker manager at Wrexham at the tail-end of the 2014–15 season alongside Carl Darlington following Kevin Wilkin's sacking.

He coached the Glyndŵr University Football Academy at Wrexham F.C before rejoining Tranmere Rovers in June 2016 as Academy Manager.

On 27 January 2025, Jones was appointed assistant manager of National League side Wealdstone.

In October 2025, Jones was appointed assistant manager of National League side Altrincham.
