= Alan Morgan (footballer, born 1973) =

Welsh footballer

Personal information
- Date of birth: 2 November 1973 (age 53)
- Place of birth: Aberystwyth, Wales
- Height: 5 ft 9 in (1.75 m)
- Position: Midfielder

Team information
- Current team: Bootle (manager)

Senior career*
Years	Team	Apps	(Gls)
1992–2002	Tranmere Rovers	65	(1)
1996	→ Altrincham (loan)	?	(?)
2002	Doncaster Rovers	3	(0)
2002–2003	Morecambe	6	(1)
2003–2004	Porthmadog	5	(0)
2004–2005	Cefn Druids	17	(0)
2005	Rhyl	1	(0)
2005–2006	Connah's Quay Nomads	24	(0)
2007	Bangor City	1	(0)
Total		122	(2)

Managerial career
- 2004: Cefn Druids (player-manager)
- 2006–2007: Connah's Quay Nomads (Assistant Manager)
- 2007–2009: Bangor City (Assistant Manager)
- 2009–2012: Aberystwyth Town
- 2012–2017: Llandudno
- 2017–2018: Colwyn Bay
- 2025–: Bootle
- * Club domestic league appearances and goals as of 17:00, 13 October 2009 (UTC)

Alan Morgan (born 2 November 1973) is a Welsh former professional footballer and Wales under-21 international. He is currently manager of Northern Premier League Division One West club Bootle.

== Playing career ==
Morgan began his career at Tranmere Rovers, making his debut on 27 August 1996 in a 2–0 victory over Port Vale before spending time on loan at Conference National side Altrincham. The following season, Morgan began to establish himself in the first team at Prenton Park, making 23 appearances in all competitions. Rovers fought their way to the 2000 League Cup Final and with Morgan as an unused substitute, they were defeated 2–1 by Leicester City. However continuing injury problems restricted his first team appearances in the following years and, in 2002, he was allowed to join Doncaster Rovers on a free transfer.

He played just three times for Doncaster before being released and instead moved to Morecambe in December 2002. After a spell with Porthmadog, Morgan took over as player-manager of Welsh Premier League side NEWI Cefn Druids, replacing Steve O'Shaughnessy in February 2004. However, he spent just 10 months in the role before stepping down in December 2004 and moving to Rhyl, where he made one appearance before ending his first team playing career at Connah's Quay Nomads.

== Managerial career ==
In 2007, Morgan joined Bangor City as assistant manager to former Tranmere player Neville Powell where they led the side to two consecutive top six finishes and UEFA Cup places.

=== Aberystwyth Town ===
Morgan was appointed as manager of his home town team Aberystwyth Town in November 2009, succeeding Brian Coyne. Morgan was joined by his former Tranmere and Wales under-21 teammate Christian Edwards, who had served as caretaker manager of the club during the vacancy, as his assistant manager. In his first season, Morgan took Aberystwyth to a fourth-placed finish.

He left the club in February 2012 by mutual consent after a disappointing season.

=== Llandudno ===
In November 2012, Morgan was appointed manager of Llandudno. Following his appointment he was named Cymru Alliance Manager of the Month. Morgan lead Llandudno to promotion to the Welsh Premier League for the first time in the club's existence after winning the 2014–15 Cymru Alliance. He parted company with the club on 23 October 2017 after five years in charge.

=== Colwyn Bay ===
In November 2017 Morgan was appointed manager of Colwyn Bay.

=== Marine ===
In September 2018 Morgan was appointed assistant manager of Marine.

=== Southport ===
In May 2024, Morgan joined National League North side Southport as first-team coach. In March 2025, he departed the club alongside manager Jim Bentley.

=== Bootle ===
On 19 March 2025, Morgan was appointed manager of Northern Premier League Division One West side Bootle.

== Honours ==
=== As a player ===
Tranmere Rovers

- Football League Cup runner-up: 1999–2000

=== As a manager ===
Llanduno

- Cymru Alliance: 2014–15

Individual

- Welsh Premier League Manager of the Month: November 2015, March 2010
