= Andy Thompson (footballer, born 1967) =

English footballer

Personal information
- Full name: Andrew Richard Thompson
- Date of birth: 9 November 1967 (age 59)
- Place of birth: Featherstone, Staffordshire
- Height: 5 ft 5 in (1.65 m)
- Position: Full back

Senior career*
Years	Team	Apps	(Gls)
1985–1986	West Bromwich Albion	24	(1)
1986–1997	Wolverhampton Wanderers	376	(43)
1997–2000	Tranmere Rovers	95	(4)
2000–2002	Cardiff City	7	(0)
2002	→ Shrewsbury Town (loan)	14	(0)
2002–2003	Shrewsbury Town	16	(0)
2003	Hednesford Town	1	(0)
Total		533	(48)
- * Club domestic league appearances and goals

Andrew Richard Thompson (born 9 November 1967 in Featherstone, Staffordshire) is an English former footballer, most associated with Wolverhampton Wanderers.

He was inducted into the Wolverhampton Wanderers Hall of Fame in 2017.

== Career ==
Thompson began his career as a midfielder with West Bromwich Albion, where he made his debut in the Full Members Cup in November 1985. He scored in the penalty shoot-out, although Albion lost to Chelsea, who went on to win the competition.

Thompson moved to rivals Wolverhampton Wanderers with Steve Bull in November 1986 for a combined fee of £60,000 and made the transition to full-back. 'Thommo' became a fans favourite at Molineux, known for his speed and penalty taking. He was an integral part of the team that won back-to-back promotions to the (old) Second Division in the late 1980s (also lifting the Associate Members' Cup). He remained a vital player in the team as they twice failed in the play-offs, as they tried to break into the Premier League during the 1990s. He eventually left the club in 1997 to join Tranmere Rovers, after making a total of 451 appearances for the Midlanders.

He played three seasons in the second flight at Prenton Park, helping the club to the League Cup final in 2000 (although he was an unused substitute at Wembley) before being released in May 2000, and subsequently joining Cardiff City on a free transfer. His time in Wales was injury-ravaged, as he tore his stomach muscles in only his second game, and damaged his ankle ligaments in his comeback game.

These setbacks and the arrival of Alan Cork as manager, saw Thompson being loaned out to League Two Shrewsbury Town in January 2002. He made the move permanent in the close season, but his only full season with the club saw them lose their league state for the first time, during another injury plagued season for the defender. After being released, he moved to non-league Hednesford Town but managed only one appearance before injury forced him to retire in 2003.

Since retiring from playing, he has completed a sports science degree at Wolverhampton University and gained a UEFA B coaching licence. He now works as a PE Teacher at Chellaston Academy in Derby and is often co-commentator for Wolves matches on the official Wolverhampton Wanderers website and app alongside Mikey Burrows.

== Statistics ==
Club Performance
Club	Season	League		FA Cup		League Cup		Other		Total
Club	Season	App	Goals	App	Goals	App	Goals	App	Goals	App	Goals
Shrewsbury Town	2002–2003	30	0	1	0	1	0	0	0	32	0
Cardiff City	2000–2002	7	0	1	0	0	0	3	0	11	0
Tranmere Rovers	1997–2000	95	4	6	0	14	0	0	0	115	4
Wolverhampton Wanderers	1986–1997	376	43	20	1	22	0	33	1	451	45
West Bromwich Albion	1985–1986	24	1	2	0	1	0	2	0	29	1
Total		532	48	30	1	38	0	38	1	638	50

== Honours ==
Wolverhampton Wanderers

- Football League Third Division: 1988–89
- Football League Fourth Division: 1987–88
- Associate Members' Cup: 1987–88

Tranmere Rovers

- Football League Cup runner-up: 1999–2000
