= Alan Mahon =

Irish footballer

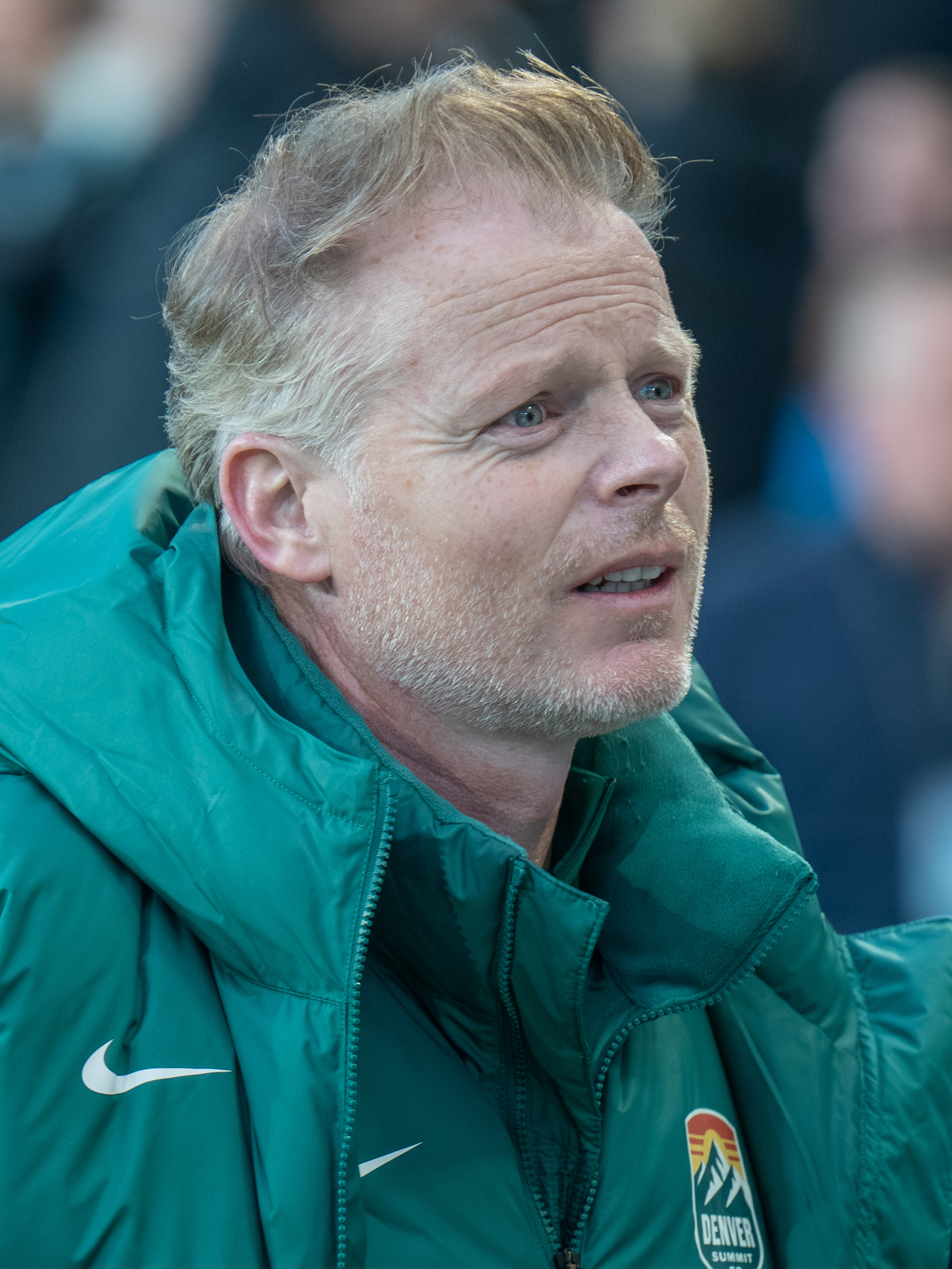
- Mahon with the Denver Summit in 2026

Personal information
- Full name: Alan Joseph Mahon
- Date of birth: 4 April 1978 (age 48)
- Place of birth: Dublin, Ireland
- Height: 5 ft 10 in (1.78 m)
- Position: Attacking midfielder

Youth career
- Lourdes Celtic
- 1993–1995: Tranmere Rovers

Senior career*
Years	Team	Apps	(Gls)
1995–2000	Tranmere Rovers	120	(13)
2000–2001	Sporting CP	1	(0)
2000–2001	→ Blackburn Rovers (loan)	18	(0)
2001–2004	Blackburn Rovers	18	(1)
2003	→ Cardiff City (loan)	15	(2)
2003	→ Ipswich Town (loan)	11	(1)
2004–2006	Wigan Athletic	47	(9)
2006	→ Burnley (loan)	8	(0)
2006–2009	Burnley	59	(4)
2009	→ Blackpool (loan)	1	(0)
2009–2011	Tranmere Rovers	16	(1)
Total		313	(31)

International career
1998–2000	Republic of Ireland U21	18	(0)
2000	Republic of Ireland	2	(0)

Managerial career
- 2020: Manchester City Women (interim)
- * Club domestic league appearances and goals

Alan Joseph Mahon (born 4 April 1978) is an Irish former professional footballer who played a midfielder and was capped by the Republic of Ireland.

== Playing career ==
=== Club career ===
==== Early career ====
Dublin-born Mahon, who was educated at James's Street Christian Brothers Secondary School in the Irish capital, joined English Football League club Tranmere Rovers in 1995. In five years at the club, Mahon made a total of 144 appearances, scoring fourteen goals. He played in the 2000 Football League Cup Final as Tranmere lost 2–1 to Leicester City at Wembley on 27 February 2000.

On 4 July 2000, he moved to Portugal, joining Portuguese Liga club Sporting CP on a free transfer. He played the first half in a 4–0 defeat in the Champions League to Real Madrid at the Santiago Bernabéu on 25 October, he was loaned to First Division club Blackburn Rovers on 15 December for the rest of the season, making his debut two days later as an 89th-minute substitute in a 2–0 victory over their Lancashire rivals Burnley at Turf Moor. He was a regular first-team squad member and made eighteen league appearances, as Blackburn finished in second place and were promoted to the Premier League.

==== Blackburn Rovers ====
On 29 June 2001, he signed for Blackburn Rovers permanently for a transfer fee of £1.5M. He made his Premier League debut on 22 August in a 2–2 draw with Manchester United at Ewood Park. Three days later he scored Blackburn's first goal in a 2–1 home win over Tottenham Hotspur. He made a total of thirteen league appearances in the 2001–02 season as Blackburn finished in tenth place. He was an unused substitute when Blackburn won the 2002 League Cup, beating Tottenham 2–1 at the Millennium Stadium in Cardiff on 24 February 2002.

After just two league appearances, in the 2002–03 season, on 20 January 2003, Mahon was sent on loan to Second Division Cardiff City for the rest of the season as the Bluebirds won promotion to the First Division. On 8 September 2003, he was loaned out to Ipswich Town, where he made eleven league appearances and scored one goal against Bradford in a three-month loan spell. He returned to Blackburn on 22 December, and made three further league appearances.

==== Wigan Athletic ====
Mahon signed for Wigan Athletic on 6 February 2004, stating that he wanted regular first-team football. He made his debut the following day in a 3–1 victory over Ipswich at Portman Road. The following season he made 27 league appearances scoring seven goals as Wigan won promotion to the Premier League.

After starting the 2005–06 season in the first team, he dropped out of favour halfway through the campaign and was allowed to leave, despite being seen as an ongoing squad player by Paul Jewell. On 23 March 2006 he joined Burnley on loan for the rest of the 2005–06 season, making his debut the following day against Norwich City. Jimmy Bullard, a Wigan Athletic player, said that all the players wore black armbands when Mahon left the club.

==== Burnley ====
After eight appearances on loan, he joined Burnley permanently on 8 June for £200,000 on a three-year contract. Burnley's then-manager Steve Cotterill described Mahon as "an absolute gem, [he is] the jewel in our crown" and it appeared that Cotterill planned to build Burnley's team around Mahon in the 2006–07 season; however, injuries and a loss of form during the 2006–07 season saw Mahon become a fringe first-team player. In the 2007–08 season, he returned to the first eleven and appeared to have regained the form that he showed when first arriving at Turf Moor. However, injuries plagued his season once again, and he started just 15 games, scoring one goal. The 2008–09 season started the same way, with his being a fringe squad player for the Clarets.

On 14 March 2009, Cotterill's successor as Burnley manager, Owen Coyle, stated that fellow Championship club Blackpool had made an enquiry to take Mahon on loan for the rest of the season, saying: "I won't stand in his way because Alan needs to play. He is a terrific professional who I have so much time for and I am trying to do right by him." Blackpool caretaker manager Tony Parkes confirmed Blackpool's interest in Mahon. Three days later he joined the Tangerines on loan until the end of the season. He made his debut on 21 March in a 1–1 draw with Southampton at Bloomfield Road.

In June 2009, Mahon was released by Burnley at the end of his contract, alongside Gabor Kiraly and Steve Jones.

==== Tranmere Rovers ====
On 6 July 2009, he signed a three-year contract with former club Tranmere Rovers. He scored his first goal for Tranmere in a 3–2 defeat against Walsall on 12 September 2009.

In July 2011, and following a series of injuries that kept him out of the first team for the whole of the 2010–11 season, Mahon's contract with Tranmere was terminated by mutual consent.

=== International career ===
Mahon played for the Republic of Ireland national under-19 football team in the 1996 UEFA European Under-18 Championship finals in Luxembourg and made his senior international debut on 26 April 2000 as a 54th-minute substitute in a 1–0 friendly defeat to Greece at Lansdowne Road, Dublin. On 11 June he played in another friendly, a 2–1 win over South Africa in Giants Stadium, New York, United States.

== Coaching career ==
In February 2020, Mahon took control of Manchester City Women on an interim basis.

== Honours ==
Tranmere Rovers

- Football League Cup runner-up: 1999–2000

Blackburn Rovers

- Football League Cup: 2001–02

Individual

- FAI Under-21 International Player of the Year: 1999
