= Gary Jones (footballer, born 1975) =

English footballer and manager

Personal information
- Full name: Gary Steven Jones
- Date of birth: 10 May 1975 (age 51)
- Place of birth: Chester, England
- Position: Forward

Team information
- Current team: Marine (First Team Coach)

Youth career
- Tranmere Rovers

Senior career*
Years	Team	Apps	(Gls)
1993–2000	Tranmere Rovers	178	(28)
2000–2002	Nottingham Forest	36	(2)
2002	→ Tranmere Rovers (loan)	6	(0)
2002–2005	Tranmere Rovers	86	(17)
2005–2008	Grimsby Town	118	(27)
Total		424	(74)

Managerial career
- 2014: Chester (caretaker)
- * Club domestic league appearances and goals

Gary Steven Jones (born 10 May 1975) is an English former professional footballer and first team coach of Marine.

As a player, he was a forward and makeshift midfielder from 1993 until 2008 for Tranmere Rovers, Nottingham Forest and Grimsby Town. In 2008 after retiring from the playing side of the game he has since held various positions on the coaching staff at Colwyn Bay, Chester, Stockport County and Altrincham.

== Playing career ==
Gary Jones started his career as a trainee at Tranmere Rovers in 1993, and he was a commanding force for the club, which in turn saw him move to Nottingham Forest in the summer of 2000. Whilst at Tranmere he played in the 2000 Football League Cup Final. However, after playing only a brief role in first team affairs at Forest, he re-joined Tranmere in 2002, initially on loan before he made the move permanent. Jones once again played a vital part in the Rovers squad, and remained a regular at Prenton Park until he was released in June 2005. He joined Grimsby Town on trial a month later and after a slow start to the 2005–06 season, due to lack of fitness, Gary provided vital goals in Grimsby's ultimately unsuccessful promotion push. He was leading goal scorer with 17 goals in all competitions and formed a very effective partnership with Michael Reddy who scored 14 goals. He was seemingly going to miss the playoff final due to a 90th minute red card in the second leg of the semi-final, but this was rescinded on appeal.

He signed a new one-year deal at Grimsby Town in the summer of 2007. He enjoyed a great rapport with the fans, and his whole-hearted displays made him a big favourite. He played most of the 2007–08 season with an injury (including an appearance as a substitute at Wembley as Grimsby lost out to MK Dons in the Football League Trophy final). Jones underwent surgery to improve his troublesome injury, but left Grimsby due to family reasons and then eventually retired.

== Management career ==
On 24 September 2008, it was announced that Jones was the new assistant manager at Colwyn Bay Football Club. On 21 May 2010 he returned to his home town and was appointed assistant manager of Chester the new club who were formed out of the liquidation of Chester City.

In January 2014 he was appointed caretaker manager of Chester following the departure of Neil Young. He has since worked at Stockport County, Altrincham and Marine. His son, Toby, plays for Marine.

== Managerial statistics ==
Team	From	To	Record				
Team	From	To	G	W	D	L	Win %
Chester (caretaker)	8 January 2014	18 January 2014	1	1	0	0	100.00
Total			1	1	0	0	100.00

== Honours ==
Tranmere Rovers

- Football League Cup runner-up: 1999–2000

Grimsby Town

- Football League Trophy runner-up: 2007–08
