= 1992–93 Derby County F.C. season =

Derby County
1992–93 season
- Chairman: Brian Fearn
- Manager: Arthur Cox
- Stadium: Baseball Ground
- First Division: 8th
- FA Cup: Quarter finals
- League Cup: Third round
- Top goalscorer: League: Kitson (17); All: Kitson (25)
- Average home league attendance: 15,020
Home colours	Away colours

During the 1992–93 English football season, Derby County F.C. competed in the Football League First Division.

== Season summary ==
Despite the addition of Craig Short for £2.5m from Notts County – a record for a team outside of the top flight and for a defender at any level – the club could only an 8th-placed finish in the 1992–93 Division One table, largely as a result of taking three points from their opening 7 fixtures, missing out on the playoffs altogether. Whilst the club did manage a trip to Wembley for the first time in nearly 20 years – reaching the final of the Anglo-Italian Cup, where they lost 1–3 to Cremonese – and recorded a club record 7 consecutive away league wins, starting with a 3–1 win at Cambridge United on 3 October 1992 and ending with a 2–1 defeat at Brentford on Boxing Day, 1992, the season was seen as something of a disappointment considering the amount of money spent and the players available to the club.

The Anglo Italian cup run, coupled with extended interest in the Coca-Cola Cup (where they took Arsenal to a third round replay) and reaching the FA Cup quarter-finals for the first time in 9 years, taking Sheffield Wednesday to a replay after a 3–3 draw at The Baseball Ground. meant the cup took part in 64 matches between 15 August 1992 and 8 May 1993, a new club record with Paul Kitson taking part in 61 of them and finishing the season as leading scorer, with 24 goals in all competitions.

== Final league table ==
Pos	Team	Pld	W	D	L	GF	GA	GD	Pts	Qualification or relegation
6	Leicester City	46	22	10	14	71	64	+7	76	Qualification for the First Division play-offs
7	Millwall	46	18	16	12	65	53	+12	70	
8	Derby County	46	19	9	18	68	57	+11	66	
9	Grimsby Town	46	19	7	20	58	57	+1	64	
10	Peterborough United	46	16	14	16	55	63	−8	62	

Source: rsssf.com
Rules for classification: 1) Points; 2) Goals scored; 3) Goal difference

== Results ==
Derby County's score comes first

=== Legend ===
Win	Draw	Loss

=== Football League First Division ===
Date	Opponent	Venue	Result	Attendance	Scorers
15 August 1992	Peterborough United	A	0–1	9,955	
22 August 1992	Newcastle United	H	1–2	17,522	Pembridge
26 August 1992	Leicester City	A	2–3	17,739	Simpson (2)
29 August 1992	Watford	A	0–0	9,809	
6 September 1992	Bristol City	H	3–4	12,738	Simpson (3)
12 September 1992	Barnsley	A	1–1	8,412	Kitson
20 September 1992	West Ham United	A	1–1	11,493	Miklosko (own goal)
26 September 1992	Southend United	H	2–0	15,172	Gabbiadini, Simpson (pen)
3 October 1992	Cambridge United	A	3–1	6,170	Gabbiadini, Simpson (2, 1 pen)
11 October 1992	Oxford United	H	0–1	14,249	
17 October 1992	Luton Town	A	3–1	8,848	Johnson, Kitson (2)
24 October 1992	Charlton Athletic	H	4–3	15,482	Pembridge, Minto (own goal), Gabbiadini, Simpson
31 October 1992	Wolverhampton Wanderers	A	2–0	17,270	Short, Kitson
3 November 1992	Notts County	A	2–0	15,267	Pembridge, Kitson
7 November 1992	Millwall	H	1–2	17,087	Pembridge
14 November 1992	Bristol Rovers	A	2–1	6,668	Johnson, Kitson
21 November 1992	Sunderland	H	0–1	17,581	
28 November 1992	Tranmere Rovers	H	1–2	15,665	Kitson
6 December 1992	Swindon Town	A	4–2	8,924	Kuhl, Pembridge, Johnson, McMinn
12 December 1992	Birmingham City	H	3–1	16,662	Johnson, Kitson, Williams
20 December 1992	Grimsby Town	A	2–0	6,475	Johnson, Kitson
26 December 1992	Brentford	A	1–2	10,226	Kitson
28 December 1992	Portsmouth	H	2–4	21,478	Johnson, Kitson
10 January 1993	West Ham United	H	0–2	13,737	
16 January 1993	Southend United	A	0–0	4,243	
31 January 1993	Newcastle United	A	1–1	27,285	Johnson
6 February 1993	Peterborough United	H	2–3	16,062	Kitson (2)
10 February 1993	Barnsley	H	3–0	13,096	Gabbiadini, Kitson, Williams
20 February 1993	Watford	H	1–2	15,190	Pembridge
24 February 1993	Leicester City	H	2–0	17,509	Gabbiadini, Forsyth
27 February 1993	Oxford United	A	1–0	7,456	Williams
3 March 1993	Cambridge United	H	0–0	14,106	
10 March 1993	Bristol Rovers	H	3–1	13,294	Gabbiadini, Short, Williams
13 March 1993	Millwall	A	0–1	9,365	
21 March 1993	Swindon Town	H	2–1	12,166	Pembridge (pen), Kitson
24 March 1993	Sunderland	A	0–1	17,246	
2 April 1993	Tranmere Rovers	A	1–2	7,774	Simpson
6 April 1993	Birmingham City	A	1–1	15,424	Johnson
10 April 1993	Brentford	H	3–2	12,366	Gabbiadini, Kitson, Simpson
12 April 1993	Portsmouth	A	0–3	23,805	
17 April 1993	Grimsby Town	H	2–1	12,428	Kitson, Simpson
20 April 1993	Bristol City	A	0–0	8,869	
24 April 1993	Luton Town	H	1–1	13,741	Short
1 May 1993	Charlton Athletic	A	1–2	7,802	Gabbiadini
5 May 1993	Notts County	H	2–0	13,326	Pembridge (pen), McMinn
8 May 1993	Wolverhampton Wanderers	H	2–0	15,083	Gabbiadini, Hayward

=== FA Cup ===
Round	Date	Opponent	Venue	Result	Attendance	Goalscorers
R3	2 January 1993	Stockport County	H	2–1	17,960	Short, Miller (own goal)
R4	23 January 1993	Luton Town	A	5–1	9,170	Short, Pembridge (3), Gabbiadini
R5	13 February 1993	Bolton Wanderers	H	3–1	20,289	Short (2), Williams
QF	8 March 1993	Sheffield Wednesday	H	3–3	22,511	Nicholson, Gabbiadini, Kitson
QFR	17 March 1993	Sheffield Wednesday	A	0–1	32,033	

=== League Cup ===
Round	Date	Opponent	Venue	Result	Attendance	Goalscorers
R2 First Leg	23 September 1992	Southend United	A	0–1	2,492	
R2 Second Leg	7 October 1992	Southend United	H	7–0 (won 7–1 on agg)	13,328	Kitson (2), Martin (own goal), Johnson, Gabbiadini (2), Simpson
R3	28 October 1992	Arsenal	H	1–1	22,208	Simpson (pen)
R3R	1 December 1992	Arsenal	A	1–2	24,588	Pembridge (pen)

=== Anglo-Italian Cup ===
Round	Date	Opponent	Venue	Result	Attendance	Goalscorers
PR Group 1	2 September 1992	Notts County	H	4–2	6,767	Kitson, Pembridge, Simpson, Gabbiadini
PR Group 1	29 September 1992	Barnsley	A	2–1	3,960	Pembridge, Goulooze
Group B	11 November 1992	Pisa S.C.	H	3–0	8,067	Johnson, Forsyth, Pembridge
Group B	24 November 1992	Cosenza 1914	A	3–0	4,269	Comyn, Kitson, Gabbiadini
Group B	8 December 1992	U.S. Cremonese	H	1–3	7,240	Kitson
Group B	16 December 1992	A.C. Reggiana	A	3–0	598	Kitson, Pembridge, Gabbiadini
SF First Leg	27 January 1993	Brentford	A	4–3	5,227	Patterson (2), Gabbiadini, Kitson
SF Second Leg	3 February 1993	Brentford	H	1–2 (won on away goals)	14,494	Gabbiadini
F	27 March 1993	U.S. Cremonese	N	1–3	37,024	Gabbiadini

== Players ==
=== First-team squad ===
The following players all played for the first-team this season.

Note: Flags indicate national team as defined under FIFA eligibility rules; some limited exceptions apply. Players may hold more than one non-FIFA nationality.

Pos.	Nation	Player
GK	ENG	Steve Sutton
GK	ENG	Martin Taylor
DF	ENG	Simon Coleman
DF	ENG	Andy Comyn
DF	ENG	Michael Forsyth
DF	ENG	Jason Kavanagh
DF	ENG	Shane Nicholson
DF	ENG	Mark Patterson
DF	ENG	Steve Round
DF	ENG	Craig Short
DF	ENG	Darren Wassall
DF	ENG	Paul Williams
MF	ENG	Steve Hayward

Pos.	Nation	Player
MF	ENG	Martin Kuhl
MF	ENG	Gary Micklewhite
MF	ENG	Craig Ramage
MF	ENG	Paul Simpson
MF	WAL	Mark Pembridge
MF	SCO	Ted McMinn
MF	NED	Richard Goulooze
FW	ENG	Marco Gabbiadini
FW	ENG	Tommy Johnson
FW	ENG	Paul Kitson
FW	ENG	Mark Stallard
FW	ENG	Dean Sturridge

=== Reserve team ===
The following players did not appear for the first team this season.

Note: Flags indicate national team as defined under FIFA eligibility rules; some limited exceptions apply. Players may hold more than one non-FIFA nationality.

Pos.	Nation	Player
MF	ENG	Lee Carsley (Note: Carsley was born in Birmingham, England, but qualified to represent the Republic of Ireland internationally through his grandmother and represented them at U-21 and B level before making his international debut for Ireland in October 1997.)
MF	ENG	Martyn Chalk

Pos.	Nation	Player
MF	ENG	Tom Curtis
FW	ENG	Stewart Hadley
