= 1993–94 Derby County F.C. season =

Derby County
1993–94 season
- Chairman: Brian Fearn
- Manager: Arthur Cox (until 2 October); Roy McFarland (from 2 October)
- Stadium: Baseball Ground
- First Division: 6th
- FA Cup: Third round
- League Cup: Third round
- Top goalscorer: League: Gabbiadini, Johnson, Kitson (13); All: Johnson (16)
- Average home league attendance: 15,937

During the 1993–94 English football season, Derby County F.C. competed in the Football League First Division.

== Season summary ==
In October of the 1993–94 season, Arthur Cox retired from football following severe back problems, leaving the role after 9 years in charge.

He was replaced by his assistant Roy McFarland (who became the only man to manage the club permanently in two separate spells) who steered the club's to a second playoff campaign. After overcoming Millwall 5–1 on aggregate in the semifinal legs, and surviving a pitch invasion in the 3–1 win at the New Den, Derby came up against local rivals Leicester City at Wembley. Despite taking the lead through Tommy Johnson, Derby lost 2–1 after a double from Steve Walsh and missed out on promotion yet again.

== Final league table ==
Pos	Team	Pld	W	D	L	GF	GA	GD	Pts	Qualification or relegation
4	Leicester City (O, P)	46	19	16	11	72	59	+13	73	Qualification for the First Division play-offs
5	Tranmere Rovers	46	21	9	16	69	53	+16	72	Qualification for the First Division play-offs
6	Derby County	46	20	11	15	73	68	+5	71	Qualification for the First Division play-offs
7	Notts County	46	20	8	18	65	69	−4	68	
8	Wolverhampton Wanderers	46	17	17	12	60	47	+13	68	

Source: rsssf.com
Rules for classification: 1) Points; 2) Goals scored; 3) Goal difference
(O) Play-off winners; (P) Promoted

== Results ==
Derby County's score comes first

=== Legend ===
Win	Draw	Loss

=== Football League First Division ===
Date	Opponent	Venue	Result	Attendance	Scorers
14 August 1993	Sunderland	H	5–0	18,027	Pembridge (2, 1 pen), Gabbiadini, Short, Kitson
18 August 1993	Nottingham Forest	A	1–1	26,684	Forsyth
21 August 1993	Middlesbrough	A	0–3	15,168	
28 August 1993	Bristol City	H	1–0	15,643	Gabbiadini
4 September 1993	Birmingham City	A	0–3	14,582	
11 September 1993	Peterborough United	H	2–0	14,779	Gabbiadini, Johnson
18 September 1993	Millwall	A	0–0	9,881	
25 September 1993	Notts County	A	1–4	11,000	Gabbiadini
3 October 1993	West Bromwich Albion	H	5–3	13,370	Simpson (2), Kitson, Pembridge (pen), Short
9 October 1993	Luton Town	H	2–1	15,885	Kitson, Johnson
16 October 1993	Portsmouth	A	2–3	12,404	Kitson, Johnson
23 October 1993	Crystal Palace	H	3–1	16,586	Harkes, Kitson, Pembridge
30 October 1993	Bolton Wanderers	A	2–0	11,464	Pembridge, Simpson
2 November 1993	Charlton Athletic	A	2–1	8,123	Simpson, Pembridge
7 November 1993	Wolverhampton Wanderers	H	0–4	14,310	
13 November 1993	Oxford United	A	0–2	7,151	
20 November 1993	Grimsby Town	H	2–1	13,498	Short, Pembridge (pen)
27 November 1993	Southend United	H	1–3	14,458	Simpson
5 December 1993	Wolverhampton Wanderers	A	2–2	16,900	Gabbiadini (2)
18 December 1993	Sunderland	A	0–1	16,001	
27 December 1993	Barnsley	A	1–0	11,562	Kitson
28 December 1993	Leicester City	H	3–2	17,372	Gabbiadini, Pembridge, Johnson
1 January 1994	Stoke City	A	1–2	20,307	Gabbiadini
3 January 1994	Tranmere Rovers	H	4–0	16,874	Gabbiadini (3), Williams
15 January 1994	Portsmouth	H	1–0	15,645	Johnson
22 January 1994	Luton Town	A	1–2	9,371	Forsyth
29 January 1994	Watford	H	1–2	15,308	Kitson
5 February 1994	Crystal Palace	A	1–1	15,615	Charles
12 February 1994	Bolton Wanderers	H	2–0	16,698	Pembridge, Gabbiadini
19 February 1994	Watford	A	4–3	8,277	Watson (own goal), Gabbiadini, Kitson, Johnson
22 February 1994	Middlesbrough	H	0–1	14,716	
26 February 1994	Birmingham City	H	1–1	16,624	Johnson
5 March 1994	Bristol City	A	0–0	8,723	
12 March 1994	Millwall	H	0–0	15,303	
16 March 1994	Peterborough United	A	2–2	7,371	Nicholson, Johnson
26 March 1994	West Bromwich Albion	A	2–1	17,437	Johnson, Simpson
29 March 1994	Tranmere Rovers	A	0–4	7,114	
2 April 1994	Barnsley	H	2–0	14,968	Johnson, Harkes
5 April 1994	Leicester City	A	3–3	20,050	Kitson (2), Willis (own goal)
9 April 1994	Stoke City	H	4–2	16,593	Pembridge, Simpson, Short, Kitson
16 April 1994	Charlton Athletic	H	2–0	15,784	Johnson, Kitson
20 April 1994	Notts County	H	1–1	18,602	Dijkstra (own goal)
23 April 1994	Grimsby Town	A	1–1	7,451	Kitson
27 April 1994	Nottingham Forest	H	0–2	19,300	
30 April 1994	Oxford United	H	2–1	11,602	Pembridge (pen), Johnson
8 May 1994	Southend United	A	3–4	8,119	Johnson, Simpson (2)

=== First Division play-offs ===
Round	Date	Opponent	Venue	Result	Attendance	Goalscorers
SF 1st leg	15 May 1994	Millwall	H	2–0	17,401	Cowans, Johnson
SF 2nd leg	18 May 1994	Millwall	A	3–1 (won 5–1 on agg)	16,470	Gabbiadini, Johnson, Van Den Hauwe (own goal)
F	30 May 1994	Leicester City	N	1–2	73,671	Johnson

=== FA Cup ===
Round	Date	Opponent	Venue	Result	Attendance	Goalscorers
R3	8 January 1994	Oldham Athletic	A	1–2	12,810	Johnson

=== League Cup ===
Round	Date	Opponent	Venue	Result	Attendance	Goalscorers
R2 1st leg	22 September 1993	Exeter City	A	3–1	5,634	Kitson, Gabbiadini, Simpson
R2 2nd leg	6 October 1993	Exeter City	H	2–0 (won 5–1 on agg)	10,569	Gabbiadini, Johnson
R3	27 October 1993	Tottenham Hotspur	H	0–1	19,855	

=== Anglo-Italian Cup ===
Round	Date	Opponent	Venue	Result	Attendance	Goalscorers
Group 2	31 August 1993	Notts County	A	2–3	3,276	Harkes, Johnson
Group 2	8 September 1993	Nottingham Forest	H	3–2	6,654	Simpson, Kitson, Kuhl

== Players ==
=== First-team squad ===
The following players all played for the first-team this season.

Note: Flags indicate national team as defined under FIFA eligibility rules; some limited exceptions apply. Players may hold more than one non-FIFA nationality.

No.	Pos.	Nation	Player
—	GK	(England) ENG	Martin Taylor
—	DF	(England) ENG	Gary Charles
—	DF	(England) ENG	Simon Coleman
—	DF	(England) ENG	Michael Forsyth
—	DF	(England) ENG	Jason Kavanagh
—	DF	(England) ENG	Shane Nicholson
—	DF	(England) ENG	Craig Short
—	DF	(England) ENG	Darren Wassall
—	DF	(England) ENG	Paul Williams
—	DF	(Wales) WAL	Kevin Ratcliffe

No.	Pos.	Nation	Player
—	MF	(England) ENG	Gordon Cowans (captain)
—	MF	(England) ENG	Steve Hayward
—	MF	(England) ENG	Martin Kuhl
—	MF	(England) ENG	Craig Ramage
—	MF	(England) ENG	Paul Simpson
—	MF	(Wales) WAL	Mark Pembridge
—	MF	(United States) USA	John Harkes
—	FW	(England) ENG	Marco Gabbiadini
—	FW	(England) ENG	Tommy Johnson
—	FW	(England) ENG	Paul Kitson

=== Reserve team ===
The following players did not appear for the first team this season.

Note: Flags indicate national team as defined under FIFA eligibility rules; some limited exceptions apply. Players may hold more than one non-FIFA nationality.

No.	Pos.	Nation	Player
—	GK	(England) ENG	Steve Sutton
—	DF	(England) ENG	Andrew Tretton
—	MF	(England) ENG	Lee Carsley (Note: Carsley was born in Birmingham, England, but qualified to represent the Republic of Ireland internationally through his grandmother and represented them at U-21 and B level before making his international debut for Ireland in October 1997.)
—	MF	(England) ENG	Martyn Chalk

No.	Pos.	Nation	Player
—	MF	(England) ENG	Kevin Cooper
—	FW	(England) ENG	Stewart Hadley
—	FW	(England) ENG	Mark Stallard
—	FW	(England) ENG	Dean Sturridge
