= 1991–92 Derby County F.C. season =

Derby County
1991–92 season
- Chairman: Brian Fearn
- Manager: Arthur Cox
- Stadium: Baseball Ground
- Second Division: 3rd
- Playoffs: Semi-finals
- FA Cup: Fourth round
- League Cup: Third round
| Home colours | Away colours |

During the 1991–92 English football season, Derby County F.C. competed in the Football League Second Division, following relegation from the First Division the previous season.

== Season summary ==
Despite the loss of key players like Mark Wright and Dean Saunders, Derby County emerged as genuine contenders for an automatic return to English football's top flight (which would be renamed the FA Premier League from the start of the next season) after the takeover by Lionel Pickering made Derby one of the richest clubs in the Second Division. Derby smashed their transfer record twice during the season, signing striker Paul Kitson for £1.3 million from East Midlands rivals Leicester City in March, followed by the signing of striker Tommy Johnson from First Division strugglers Notts County for the same fee. Club legend Bobby Davison was also re-signed, on loan from Leeds United; he scored 8 goals in 10 games to reach a century of goals for the Rams. However, in spite of this flurry of transfer activity and breaking the club's record for away wins (12) Derby were unable to gain automatic promotion, finishing two points adrift of second-placed Middlesbrough. Derby qualified for the playoffs, but were knocked out in the semi-finals by Blackburn Rovers on a 5–4 scoreline over two legs.

At the end of the season, Scottish winger Ted McMinn was named the club's player of the season.

November saw the death of former chairman Robert Maxwell, who had just sold the club to Lionel Pickering earlier in the year. Maxwell disappeared from his luxury yacht, the Lady Ghislaine, while it was cruising off the Canary Islands; his body was later found drifting in the Atlantic Ocean. His death was officially ruled as accidental drowning after he supposedly fell off the yacht, though commentators have alleged it was murder or suicide.

== Kit ==
Derby's kit was manufactured by English company Umbro and were sponsored by Auto Windscreens.

== First-team squad ==
Squad at end of season

Note: Flags indicate national team as defined under FIFA eligibility rules; some limited exceptions apply. Players may hold more than one non-FIFA nationality.

| Pos. | Nation | Player |
|---|---|---|
| GK | ENG | Peter Shilton |
| GK | ENG | Steve Sutton |
| GK | ENG | Martin Taylor |
| DF | ENG | Simon Coleman |
| DF | ENG | Andy Comyn |
| DF | ENG | Steve Cross |
| DF | ENG | Jonathan Davidson |
| DF | ENG | Michael Forsyth |
| DF | ENG | Jason Kavanagh |
| DF | ENG | Shane Nicholson |
| DF | ENG | Mark Patterson |
| DF | ENG | Steve Round |
| DF | ENG | Mel Sage |
| DF | ENG | Paul Williams |

| Pos. | Nation | Player |
|---|---|---|
| MF | ENG | Martin Chalk |
| MF | ENG | Tom Curtis |
| MF | ENG | Steve Hayward |
| MF | ENG | Gary Micklewhite |
| MF | ENG | Craig Ramage |
| MF | ENG | Paul Simpson (from February) |
| MF | WAL | Geraint Williams |
| MF | SCO | Ted McMinn |
| FW | ENG | Marco Gabbiadini |
| FW | ENG | Tommy Johnson |
| FW | ENG | Paul Kitson (from March) |
| FW | ENG | Mark Stallard |
| FW | ENG | Dean Sturridge |
| FW | ENG | Jason White |

=== Left club during season ===
Note: Flags indicate national team as defined under FIFA eligibility rules; some limited exceptions apply. Players may hold more than one non-FIFA nationality.

| Pos. | Nation | Player |
|---|---|---|
| MF | ENG | Nick Pickering (to Darlington) |
| FW | ENG | Phil Gee (to Leicester City) |
| FW | ENG | Mick Harford (to Luton Town) |

| Pos. | Nation | Player |
|---|---|---|
| FW | ENG | Ian Ormondroyd (to Leicester City) |
| FW | ENG | Bobby Davison (on loan from Leeds United) |

== Transfers ==
=== In ===
- (England) Marco Gabbiadini – (England) Crystal Palace, £1,000,000
- (England) Paul Simpson – (England) Oxford United, £500,000, February
- (England) Paul Kitson – (England) Leicester City, £1,300,000, March
- (England) Tommy Johnson – (England) Notts County, £1,300,000, March
- (England) Bobby Davison – (England) Leeds United, loan

=== Out ===
- (England) Mark Wright – (England) Liverpool, £2,500,000, 15 July (national record for defender)
- (Wales) Dean Saunders – (England) Liverpool, £2,900,000, 19 July (national record for any player)
- (England) Phil Gee – (England) Leicester City, part-exchange for Kitson, March
- (England) Ian Ormondroyd – (England) Leicester City, part-exchange for Kitson, March

== Results ==
=== Football League Second Division ===
==== League table ====
| Pos | Team | Pld | W | D | L | GF | GA | GD | Pts | Qualification or relegation |
|---|---|---|---|---|---|---|---|---|---|---|
| 1 | Ipswich Town (C, P) | 46 | 24 | 12 | 10 | 70 | 50 | +20 | 84 | Promotion to the FA Premier League |
| 2 | Middlesbrough (P) | 46 | 23 | 11 | 12 | 58 | 41 | +17 | 80 | Promotion to the FA Premier League |
| 3 | Derby County | 46 | 23 | 9 | 14 | 69 | 51 | +18 | 78 | Qualification for the Second Division play-offs |
| 4 | Leicester City | 46 | 23 | 8 | 15 | 62 | 55 | +7 | 77 | Qualification for the Second Division play-offs |
| 5 | Cambridge United | 46 | 19 | 17 | 10 | 65 | 47 | +18 | 74 | Qualification for the Second Division play-offs |

Rules for classification: 1) Points; 2) Goal difference; 3) Goals scored
(C) Champions; (P) Promoted

==== Matches ====
Second Division results
| Date | Match No. | Opponents | Home/ Away | Result F–A | Derby Scorers | Attendance | Pos |
|---|---|---|---|---|---|---|---|
| 17 August 1991 | 1 | Sunderland | A | 1–1 | | | 9 |
| 21 August 1991 | 2 | Middlesbrough | H | 2–0 | | | 2 |
| 24 August 1991 | 3 | Southend United | H | 1–2 | | | 7 |
| 1 September 1991 | 4 | Charlton Athletic | A | 2–0 | | | 5 |
| 4 September 1991 | 5 | Blackburn Rovers | H | 0–2 | | | 9 |
| 7 September 1991 | 6 | Barnsley | H | 1–1 | | | 11 |
| 13 September 1991 | 7 | Cambridge United | A | 0–0 | | | 8 |
| 18 September 1991 | 8 | Oxford United | A | 0–2 | | | 15 |
| 21 September 1991 | 9 | Brighton & Hove Albion | H | 3–1 | | | 11 |
| 28 September 1991 | 10 | Newcastle United | A | 2–2 | | | 13 |
| 5 October 1991 | 11 | Bristol City | H | 4–1 | | | 8 |
| 12 October 1991 | 12 | Swindon Town | A | 2–1 | | | 6 |
| 19 October 1991 | 13 | Portsmouth | H | 2–0 | | | 6 |
| 26 October 1991 | 14 | Millwall | A | 2–1 | | | 6 |
| 2 November 1991 | 15 | Tranmere Rovers | H | 0–1 | | | 7 |
| 6 November 1991 | 16 | Port Vale | A | 0–1 | | | 7 |
| 9 November 1991 | 17 | Wolverhampton Wanderers | A | 3–2 | | | 6 |
| 16 November 1991 | 18 | Ipswich Town | H | 1–0 | | | 3 |
| 23 November 1991 | 19 | Bristol Rovers | A | 3–2 | | | 3 |
| 30 November 1991 | 20 | Leicester City | H | 1–2 | | | 3 |
| 7 December 1991 | 21 | Watford | A | 2–1 | | | 4 |
| 26 December 1991 | 22 | Grimsby Town | H | 0–0 | | | 5 |
| 28 December 1991 | 23 | Charlton Athletic | H | 1–2 | | | 8 |
| 1 January 1992 | 24 | Middlesbrough | A | 1–1 | | | 8 |
| 11 January 1992 | 25 | Southend United | A | 0–1 | | | 9 |
| 18 January 1992 | 26 | Sunderland | H | 1–2 | | | 11 |
| 1 February 1992 | 27 | Portsmouth | A | 1–0 | | | 11 |
| 8 February 1992 | 28 | Millwall | H | 0–2 | | | 11 |
| 11 February 1992 | 29 | Blackburn Rovers | A | 0–2 | | | 11 |
| 15 February 1992 | 30 | Bristol Rovers | H | 1–0 | | | 10 |
| 22 February 1992 | 31 | Leicester City | A | 2–1 | | | 9 |
| 29 February 1992 | 32 | Watford | H | 3–1 | | | 6 |
| 7 March 1992 | 33 | Plymouth Argyle | A | 1–1 | | | 6 |
| 11 March 1992 | 34 | Port Vale | H | 3–1 | | | 4 |
| 14 March 1992 | 35 | Tranmere Rovers | A | 3–4 | | | 5 |
| 21 March 1992 | 36 | Wolverhampton Wanderers | H | 1–2 | | | 9 |
| 25 March 1992 | 37 | Plymouth Argyle | H | 2–0 | | | 5 |
| 28 March 1992 | 38 | Ipswich Town | A | 1–2 | | | 8 |
| 1 April 1992 | 39 | Cambridge United | H | 0–0 | | | 7 |
| 4 April 1992 | 40 | Barnsley | A | 3–0 | | | 5 |
| 7 April 1992 | 41 | Grimsby Town | A | 1–0 | | | 4 |
| 11 April 1992 | 42 | Oxford United | H | 2–2 | | | 5 |
| 15 April 1992 | 43 | Brighton & Hove Albion | A | 2–1 | | | 4 |
| 20 April 1992 | 44 | Newcastle United | H | 4–1 | | | 3 |
| 25 April 1992 | 45 | Bristol City | A | 2–1 | | | 3 |
| 2 May 1992 | 46 | Swindon Town | H | 2–1 | | | 3 |

=== FA Cup ===
- 4–6 January: Burnley 2–2 Derby County (Chalk, Comyn)
- 14–15 January: Derby County 2–0 Burnley (replay; abandoned 75' due to freezing fog) (Gee, Patterson)
- 25 January: Derby County 2–0 Burnley (replay) (Williams, Ormondroyd)
- 25–27 January: Derby County 3–4 Aston Villa (Gee 2, P. Williams)

=== Playoffs ===
- Blackburn Rovers 4–2 Derby County
- Derby County 2–1 Blackburn Rovers
