= Derby County F.C. Player of the Year =

Derby County's Player Of The Season award is voted for by the club's supporters and named in honour of Jackie Stamps (The Jack Stamps Trophy) – who scored two goals in Derby's sole FA Cup final victory in 1946. It was first awarded in the 1968–69 season.

== Key ==
Symbol	Meaning
‡	Divisional change due to promotion or relegation.
†	Derby County player in the 2024–25 season.
Apps	Appearances.
Player (X)	Number of times a player has won the award.

== Winners ==
As of the end of the 2024–25 season.

Season	Level (Note: The official level of competition in the structure of the English football league system.)	Name	Position (Note: For a detailed description of playing positions, see Association football positions.)	Nationality	Apps	Goals	Notes	Ref
1968–69	2	Roy McFarland	Defender	England	51	9	(Note: The first winner of the award in 1969.)	
1969–70	1 ‡	John O'Hare	Forward	Scotland	49	16		
1970–71	1	Dave Mackay	Defender	Scotland	47	3		
1971–72	1	Colin Todd	Defender	England	49	0		
1972–73	1	Kevin Hector	Forward	England	57	23		
1973–74	1	Ron Webster	Defender	England	45	0		
1974–75	1	Peter Daniel	Defender	England	49	3		
1975–76	1	Charlie George	Forward	England	46	24		
1976–77	1	Leighton James	Midfielder	Wales	55	15		
1977–78	1	Dave Langan	Defender	Republic of Ireland	44	0		
1978–79	1	Steve Powell	Midfielder	England	43	3		
1979–80	1	Steve Buckley	Defender	England	45	0		
1980–81	2 ‡	Roger Jones	Goalkeeper	England	46	0	(Note: The first goalkeeper to win.)	
1981–82	2	Steve Buckley (2)	Defender	England	43	5	(Note: Won the award on two occasions.)	
1982–83	2	Steve Cherry	Goalkeeper	England	35	0		
1983–84	2	Archie Gemmill	Midfielder	Scotland	44	2		
1984–85	3 ‡	Bobby Davison	Forward	England	50	23		
1985–86	3	Ross MacLaren	Defender	Scotland	58	5		
1986–87	2 ‡	Geraint Williams	Midfielder	Wales	46	2		
1987–88	1 ‡	Michael Forsyth	Defender	England	42	2		
1988–89	1	Mark Wright	Defender	England	37	1		
1989–90	1	Mark Wright (2)	Defender	England	43	6	(Note: The first back-to-back winner)	
1990–91	1	Dean Saunders	Forward	Wales	43	20		
1991–92	2 ‡	Ted McMinn	Midfielder	Scotland	45	3		
1992–93	2	Marco Gabbiadini	Forward	England	54	12		
1993–94	2	Martin Taylor	Goalkeeper	England	53	0		
1994–95	2	Craig Short	Defender	England	42	3		
1995–96	2	Dean Yates	Defender	England	42	2		
1996–97	1 ‡	Chris Powell	Defender	England	39	0		
1997–98	1	Francesco Baiano	Forward	Italy	36	13	(Note: The first winner from outside the British Isles.)	
1998–99	1	Jacob Laursen	Defender	Denmark	44	0		
1999–2000	1	Mart Poom	Goalkeeper	Estonia	29	0		
2000–01	1	Chris Riggott	Defender	England	36	5		
2001–02	1	Danny Higginbotham	Defender	Gibraltar	40	1	(Note: Higginbotham was considered English at the time of winning, and later switched international allegiance to Gibraltar in 2013.)	
2002–03	2 ‡	Giorgi Kinkladze	Midfielder	Georgia	30	4		
2003–04	2	Youl Mawéné	Defender	France	31	0		
2004–05	2	Iñigo Idiakez	Midfielder	Spain	46	10		
2005–06	2	Tommy Smith	Midfielder	England	46	10		
2006–07	2	Steve Howard	Forward	Scotland	51	19	(Note: Howard was considered English at the time of winning, and later switched international allegiance to Scotland in November 2007.)	
2007–08	1 ‡	The Fans					(Note: After poor results throughout the season.)	
2008–09	2 ‡	Rob Hulse	Forward	England	54	18		
2009–10	2	Shaun Barker	Defender	England	38	5		
2010–11	2	John Brayford	Defender	England	48	1		
2011–12	2	Craig Bryson	Midfielder	Scotland	46	6		
2012–13	2	Richard Keogh	Defender	Republic of Ireland	49	4		
2013–14	2	Craig Bryson (2)	Midfielder	Scotland	49	16		
2014–15	2	Will Hughes	Midfielder	England	47	3		
2015–16	2	Richard Keogh (2)	Defender	Republic of Ireland	49	1		
2016–17	2	Scott Carson	Goalkeeper	England	50	0		
2017–18	2	Matěj Vydra	Forward	Czech Republic	44	22		
2018–19	2	Fikayo Tomori	Defender	England	49	2		
2019–20	2	Matthew Clarke †	Defender	England	35	1		
2020–21	2	Graeme Shinnie	Midfielder	Scotland	43	3		
2021–22	2	Curtis Davies	Defender	Sierra Leone	47	4	(Note: Davies was considered English at the time of winning, and later switched international allegiance to Sierra Leone in 2023.)	
2022–23	3 ‡	David McGoldrick	Striker	Republic of Ireland	45	25		
2023–24	3	Curtis Nelson	Defender	England	51	2		
2024–25	2 ‡	Ebou Adams	Midfielder	Gambia	46	6		
2025–26	2	Matthew Clarke (2) †	Defender	England	45	3		

^{+} Cited sources as at and subsequent to Derby County's 1968–69 season.

== Wins by playing position ==
Position	Individuals	Total
Goalkeeper	5	5
Defender	24	28
Midfielder	12	13
Striker	11	11

== Wins by nationality ==
Nationality	Individuals	Total
England	28	31
Scotland	8	9
Republic of Ireland	3	4
Wales	3	3
Czech Republic	1	1
Denmark	1	1
Estonia	1	1
France	1	1
Gambia	1	1
Georgia	1	1
Gibraltar	1	1
Italy	1	1
Sierra Leone	1	1
Spain	1	1
