= 1994 Football League First Division play-off final =

Association football match in London

- Wembley Stadium
Derby County	Leicester City
1	2
- Date: 30 May 1994
- Venue: Wembley Stadium, London
- Referee: Roger Milford (Bristol)
- Attendance: 73,671

The 1994 Football League First Division play-off final was an association football match which was played on 30 May 1994 at Wembley Stadium, London, between local rivals Derby County and Leicester City. The match was to determine the third and final team to gain promotion from the Football League First Division, the second tier of English football, to the Premiership. The top two teams of the 1993–94 Football League First Division season gained automatic promotion to the Premiership, while the clubs placed from third to sixth place took part in play-off semi-finals; the winners of these semi-finals competed for the final place for the 1994–95 season in the Premiership. Leicester City ended the season in fourth position, two places ahead of Derby County. The teams defeated Tranmere Rovers and Millwall, respectively, in the semi-finals.

The final was played in front of a crowd of 73,671 and was refereed by Roger Milford. Derby made the better start with Marco Gabbiadini's early chance being cleared off the line. On 27 minutes, Derby took the lead: Paul Simpson's through-ball found Tommy Johnson who out-ran both Simon Grayson and Brian Carey before scoring past Gavin Ward. Four minutes before half-time, Steve Walsh levelled the score after Paul Williams failed to clear his shot off the line. In the 86th minute, Grayson made a run down the right and his pass to the centre was met by Ian Ormondroyd's header. Martin Taylor made the save but the rebound fell to Walsh who scored to put Leicester back into the lead. The match ended 2–1 to secure Leicester City's first win in the play-offs in three attempts.

Derby County ended their following season in ninth place in the First Division, six points below the final play-off places. Leicester City were relegated from the Premiership the next season after finishing in 19th position, three places and nineteen points from safety.

== Route to the final ==
Football League First Division final table, leading positions
Pos	Team	Pld	W	D	L	GF	GA	GD	Pts
1	Crystal Palace	46	27	9	10	73	46	+27	90
2	Nottingham Forest	46	23	14	9	74	49	+25	83
3	Millwall	46	19	17	10	58	49	+9	74
4	Leicester City	46	19	16	11	72	59	+13	73
5	Tranmere Rovers	46	21	9	16	69	53	+16	72
6	Derby County	46	20	11	15	73	68	+5	71

Leicester City finished the regular 1993–94 season in fourth place in the Football League First Division, the second tier of the English football league system, two places and two points ahead of Derby County. Both therefore missed out on the two automatic places for promotion to the Premiership and instead took part in the play-offs, along with Millwall and Tranmere Rovers, to determine the third promoted team. Leicester City finished ten points behind Nottingham Forest (who were promoted in second place) and seventeen behind league winners Crystal Palace.

Derby County faced Millwall in their play-off semi-final, and the first match of the two-legged tie took place at the Baseball Ground in Derby on 15 May 1994. Midway through the first half the home side took the lead with a goal from Gordon Cowans. Paul Simpson's shot struck the post and as the Millwall goalkeeper Kasey Keller failed to gather the rebound, Cowans struck low to score his first goal in 19 months. Derby dominated the second half and doubled their lead when Tommy Johnson scored on 60 minutes having been sent clear by Marco Gabbiadini; the match ended 2–0. The second leg was played three days later at the New Den in London and was marred by two pitch invasions by Millwall supporters. Gabbiadini put Derby ahead on 16 minutes after converting a cross from Mark Pembridge. Johnson scored the second goal for Derby six minutes later. Soon after fans ran onto the pitch and were confronted by mounted police officers; the players left the pitch while numerous arrests were made. Play restarted nearly 20 minutes later, and Pat Van Den Hauwe extended Derby's lead with a goal three minutes before half time. Greg Berry reduced the deficit with a header on the hour mark, making it 3–1. Minutes later, just as the referee was about to award a penalty to Millwall, a second pitch invasion took place and the players retreated to the dressing rooms once again. They returned to the pitch 12 minutes later whereupon the referee opted not to award the penalty. No further goals were scored and Derby County progressed to the play-off final with an aggregate 5–1 victory. After the game, Millwall's chairman Reg Burr claimed that the play-offs were "a recipe for violence" and argued "they should be scrapped or else changed radically."

Leicester City's opponents in their semi-final were Tranmere Rovers, with the first leg being hosted at Prenton Park, Tranmere, on 15 May 1994. The match ended goalless with one of the best chances falling to the home side, when John Aldridge's close range shot was saved by the fingertips of Gavin Ward. The return leg took place three days later at Filbert Street in Leicester. In the last moments of the first half, Leicester took the lead: Mark Blake's shot hit the post and Ian Ormondroyd converted the rebound. A minute into the second half, Pat Nevin levelled the score by converting a Ged Brannan cross. David Speedie, a second-half substitute, then restored Leicester's lead with four minutes remaining, heading in a free kick from Blake. With only seconds of the match remaining, an altercation between Speedie and the Tranmere goalkeeper Eric Nixon resulted in both players being sent off. The match ended 2–1 to Leicester and they qualified for the final.

== Match ==
=== Background ===
This was Derby County's first appearance in the second-tier play-off final but they had featured in the 1992 Football League play-offs, where they were eliminated in the semi-finals by Blackburn Rovers. The club had featured in the second tier since suffering relegation from the top league in the 1990–91 season. Leicester were appearing in their third consecutive second tier play-off final, having lost in both 1992 and 1993. They had played in the second tier of English football since they were relegated from the First Division in the 1986–87 season. Derby County won the first of the two meetings between the clubs during the regular season, with a 3–2 victory at the Baseball Ground in December 1993. The return fixture was a 3–3 draw at Filbert Street the following April. Derby County's top scorer was Tommy Johnson with 16 goals (13 in the league, 1 in the FA Cup, 1 in the League Cup and 1 in the Anglo-Italian Cup). Two players had 15 goals for the season: Gabbiadini (13 in the league and 2 in the League Cup), and Paul Kitson (13 in the league, 1 in the League Cup and 1 in the Anglo-Italian Cup). Iwan Roberts and Speedie were Leicester City's top scorers with 13 goals (all in the league for Roberts, while Speedie's tally included 1 in the League Cup), while Julian Joachim had scored 12 during the regular season (11 in the league, 1 in the League Cup).

The Derby County manager Roy McFarland had been appointed to the role in October 1993, taking over from Arthur Cox with the club in eleventh place, and was given a simple briefing to "get promotion this season". Steve Walsh was making his second full appearance for Leicester since September 1993 when he suffered cruciate ligament injury compounded by tendonitis. The Derby County chairman Lionel Pickering had invested £12 million bringing players to the club.

The referee for the match was Roger Milford from Bristol; it was his last match as a league official. The final was broadcast live in the United Kingdom on ITV as part of The Match programme. Derby County played in a 4–4–2 formation while Leicester City started with five defenders, two in midfield and three players in attack.

=== Summary ===
The match kicked off around 3 p.m. on 30 May 1994 in front of a Wembley Stadium crowd of 73,671. Derby made the better start against Leicester's five-man defence: Jimmy Willis cleared a shot off the goalline from Gabbiadini in the first minute of the match. On 24 minutes, Pembridge and Gabbiadini set up Johnson but he sliced his shot wide of the Leicester goal. Three minutes later, Derby took the lead: Simpson's through-ball found Johnson who out-ran both Simon Grayson and Brian Carey before scoring past Ward. On 41 minutes, Roberts blocked the Derby goalkeeper Martin Taylor with an elbow to his head as he attempted to reach Gary Coatsworth's cross (a clear foul that Referee Roger Milford failed to penalise) causing Taylor to drop the ball. Walsh headed the loose ball goal-bound, Paul Williams failed to clear it off the line, and the scores were level at 1–1.

The first substitution of the game came in the 56th minute when Leicester's Roberts was replaced by Joachim. On 68 minutes, Steve Thompson came on for Coatsworth. In the 84th minute Colin Gibson slipped, allowing John Harkes a chance, but he shot wide of the Leicester goal. Two minutes later, Grayson made a run down the right and his pass to the centre was met by Ormondroyd's header. Taylor made the save but the rebound fell to Walsh who scored for the second time to put Leicester back into the lead. Derby made their only substitution of the match straight away when striker Kitson replaced defender Michael Forsyth, but no further goals were scored; the match ended 2–1 to Leicester.

=== Details ===
30 May 1994
15:00 BST

Leicester City	2–1	Derby County
Walsh 41', 84'	Report	Johnson 28'

Wembley Stadium, London
Attendance: 73,671
Referee: Roger Milford (Bristol)

Leicester City	Derby County

GK	1	Gavin Ward
SW	6	Gary Coatsworth	(substituted off) 68'
RB	2	Simon Grayson (c)
CB	5	Brian Carey
CB	4	Jimmy Willis
LB	3	Mike Whitlow
CM	7	Mark Blake
CM	8	Colin Gibson
CF	9	Steve Walsh
CF	10	Iwan Roberts	(substituted off) 56'
CF	11	Ian Ormondroyd
Substitutes:
FW	12	Julian Joachim	(substituted on) 56'
MF	14	Steve Thompson	(substituted on) 68'
GK	15	Kevin Poole
Manager:
Brian Little

GK	1	Martin Taylor
RB	2	Gary Charles
CB	5	Craig Short
CB	6	Paul Williams
LB	3	Michael Forsyth	(substituted off) 87'
RM	7	John Harkes
CM	4	Gordon Cowans
CM	8	Mark Pembridge
LM	11	Paul Simpson
CF	9	Marco Gabbiadini
CF	10	Tommy Johnson
Substitutes:
CF	12	Paul Kitson	(substituted on) 87'
GK	13	Steve Sutton
MF	14	Jason Kavanagh
Manager:
Roy McFarland

== Post-match ==
The winning manager Brian Little admitted to being overcome with emotion: "I was a little bit overwhelmed. That is unusual for me but in a way the emotion was even greater than when we lost". He said he was nonetheless unimpressed by his team: "it was not really the sort of performance we were hoping to put on, but today it was the result that mattered." Walsh expressed relief at avoiding a third consecutive play-off final defeat, noting: "I can't believe what has happened here after the disappointments of the last two years". He acknowledged that he was not completely fit and was grateful to avoid the match going into extra time. McFarland suggested his team would bounce back, but acknowledged that "there were a lot of tears on the pitch afterwards which shows the depth of feeling among the players". Regarding his job as manager, he reflected that he was "not concerned" and "would love the chance to have another go."

Derby County ended their following season in ninth place in the First Division, six points below the final play-off places. Leicester City were relegated from the Premiership the next season after finishing in 21st position, three places and nineteen points from safety.
