= 1990–91 Derby County F.C. season =

Derby County
1990–91 season
- Chairman: Robert Maxwell
- Manager: Arthur Cox
- Stadium: Baseball Ground
- First Division: 20th (relegated)
- FA Cup: Third round
- League Cup: Fourth round
- Full Members Cup: Quarter finals (Northern Area)
- Player of the Year: Dean Saunders
- Top goalscorer: League: Dean Saunders (17); All: Dean Saunders (21)
- Highest home attendance: 21,729 vs Nottingham Forest (24 Nov 1990, First Division)
- Lowest home attendance: 7,270 vs Coventry City (19 Dec 1990, Full Members Cup)
- Average home league attendance: 16,257
Home colours

During the 1990–91 English football season, Derby County F.C. competed in the Football League First Division.

== Season summary ==
In the 1990–91 season, the Rams endured an even worse season than the one before. Between December 1990 and April 1991, Derby went a club record 20 games without a win and equalled the worst ever home league defeat when they crashed 7–1 at home to Liverpool. Gates dropped to 11,000 from an opening match crowd of 18,011 against Sheffield United and the team looked a shadow of the one that had finished fifth two years before as they were relegated and finished bottom of the table with just 5 wins and 24 points from 38 games, a massive 13 points from safety.

== Final league table ==
Pos	Team	Pld	W	D	L	GF	GA	GD	Pts	Qualification or relegation
16	Coventry City	38	11	11	16	42	49	−7	44	
17	Aston Villa	38	9	14	15	46	58	−12	41	
18	Luton Town	38	10	7	21	42	61	−19	37	
19	Sunderland (R)	38	8	10	20	38	60	−22	34	Relegation to the Second Division
20	Derby County (R)	38	5	9	24	37	75	−38	24	Relegation to the Second Division

Source: World Football
Rules for classification: 1) Points; 2) Goal difference; 3) Goals scored
(R) Relegated

== Results ==
Derby County's score comes first

=== Legend ===
Win	Draw	Loss

=== Football League First Division ===
Date	Opponent	Venue	Result	Attendance	Scorers
25 August 1990	Chelsea	A	1–2	24,652	Saunders
29 August 1990	Sheffield United	H	1–1	18,011	Saunders
1 September 1990	Wimbledon	H	1–1	12,469	Saunders (pen)
8 September 1990	Tottenham Hotspur	A	0–3	29,614	
15 September 1990	Aston Villa	H	0–2	19,024	
22 September 1990	Norwich City	A	1–2	13,258	Patterson
29 September 1990	Crystal Palace	H	0–2	15,202	
6 October 1990	Liverpool	A	0–2	37,076	
20 October 1990	Manchester City	H	1–1	17,884	Saunders
27 October 1990	Southampton	A	1–0	16,328	Harford
3 November 1990	Luton Town	H	2–1	15,008	Callaghan, Saunders (pen)
10 November 1990	Manchester United	H	0–0	21,115	
17 November 1990	Leeds United	A	0–3	27,868	
24 November 1990	Nottingham Forest	H	2–1	21,729	Ramage, Saunders
1 December 1990	Sunderland	A	2–1	21,212	Saunders, Harford
15 December 1990	Chelsea	H	4–6	15,057	Hebberd, Micklewhite, Saunders (2)
23 December 1990	Queens Park Rangers	H	1–1	16,429	Saunders
26 December 1990	Arsenal	A	0–3	25,538	
29 December 1990	Everton	A	0–2	25,361	
1 January 1991	Coventry City	H	1–1	15,741	Harford
12 January 1991	Wimbledon	A	1–3	4,724	Harford
20 January 1991	Tottenham Hotspur	H	0–1	17,747	
26 January 1991	Sheffield United	A	0–1	18,390	
2 February 1991	Aston Villa	A	2–3	21,852	Harford, Sage
23 February 1991	Norwich City	H	0–0	14,102	
2 March 1991	Sunderland	H	3–3	16,027	Saunders (3, 1 pen)
16 March 1991	Crystal Palace	A	1–2	14,752	Micklewhite
23 March 1991	Liverpool	H	1–7	20,531	Saunders
30 March 1991	Arsenal	H	0–2	18,397	
1 April 1991	Queens Park Rangers	A	1–1	12,036	Harford
10 April 1991	Nottingham Forest	A	0–1	25,109	
13 April 1991	Coventry City	A	0–3	11,961	
16 April 1991	Manchester United	A	1–3	32,776	P Williams
20 April 1991	Manchester City	A	1–2	24,037	Harford
23 April 1991	Leeds United	H	0–1	12,666	
4 May 1991	Southampton	H	6–2	11,680	Phillips, Saunders (2), P Williams (3, 1 pen)
8 May 1991	Everton	H	2–3	12,403	Saunders, Harford (pen)
11 May 1991	Luton Town	A	0–2	12,889	

=== FA Cup ===
Round	Date	Opponent	Venue	Result	Attendance	Goalscorers
R3	5 January 1991	Newcastle United	A	0–2	19,584	

=== League Cup ===
Round	Date	Opponent	Venue	Result	Attendance	Goalscorers
R2 1st Leg	26 September 1990	Carlisle United	A	1–1	7,628	Saunders
R2 2nd Leg	10 October 1990	Carlisle United	H	1–0 (won 2–1 on agg)	12,253	Saunders
R3	31 October 1990	Sunderland	H	6–0	16,422	Harford (3), Bennett (own goal), Ramage (2)
R4	28 November 1990	Sheffield Wednesday	A	1–1	25,649	Saunders
R4R	12 December 1990	Sheffield Wednesday	H	1–2	17,050	Micklewhite

=== Full Members Cup ===
Round	Date	Opponent	Venue	Result	Attendance	Goalscorers
NR2	19 December 1990	Coventry City	H	1–0	7,270	Callaghan
NQF	22 January 1991	Leeds United	A	1–2	6,642	Saunders

== Squad ==
Note: Flags indicate national team as defined under FIFA eligibility rules; some limited exceptions apply. Players may hold more than one non-FIFA nationality.

Pos.	Nation	Player
GK	ENG	Scott Cooksey
GK	ENG	Peter Shilton
GK	ENG	Martin Taylor
DF	ENG	Robbie Briscoe
DF	ENG	Jon Davidson
DF	ENG	Michael Forsyth
DF	ENG	Jason Kavanagh
DF	ENG	Mark Patterson
DF	ENG	Justin Phillips
DF	WAL	Mel Sage
DF	ENG	Alex Watson (on loan from Liverpool)
DF	ENG	Paul Williams
DF	ENG	Mark Wright
MF	ENG	Nigel Callaghan (on loan from Aston Villa)
MF	ENG	Martyn Chalk

Pos.	Nation	Player
MF	ENG	Steve Cross
MF	ENG	Steve Hayward
MF	ENG	Trevor Hebberd
MF	SCO	Ted McMinn
MF	ENG	Gary Micklewhite
MF	ENG	Nick Pickering
MF	ENG	Craig Ramage
MF	WAL	Geraint Williams
MF	SCO	Ian Wilson
FW	ENG	Bobby Davison (on loan from Leeds United)
FW	SKN	Kevin Francis
FW	ENG	Phil Gee
FW	ENG	Mick Harford
FW	WAL	Dean Saunders
FW	ENG	Jason White

== Transfers ==
=== Out ===
Date	Pos	Name	To	Fee
18 July 1990	DF	Paul Blades	Norwich City	£700,000
7 February 1991	GK	Scott Cooksey	Shrewsbury Town	Free transfer
21 February 1991	FW	Kevin Francis	Stockport County	£45,000

Transfers in: ▼£0
Transfers out: ▲£745,000
Total spending: ▲£745,000
