= 1994–95 Derby County F.C. season =

Derby County
1994–95 season
- Chairman: Brian Fearn (until October); Lionel Pickering
- Manager: Roy McFarland (until 29 April); Billy McEwan (from 29 April)
- Stadium: Baseball Ground
- First Division: 9th
- FA Cup: Third round
- League Cup: Fourth round
- Anglo-Italian Cup: Group stage
- Top goalscorer: League: Gabbiadini (11); All: Gabbiadini (13)
- Average home league attendance: 13,589

During the 1994–95 English football season, Derby County F.C. competed in the Football League First Division.

== Season summary ==
During the 1994–95 season, several players left Derby, including Kitson joining Newcastle United for £2.25m, Charles and Johnson moving to Aston Villa for a combined £2.9m and Pembridge moving to Sheffield Wednesday. The side was also weakened when goalkeeper Martin Taylor, an ever-present the previous season and touted for a place in the England squad, broke his leg in a 1–0 defeat at Southend United and was out of action for the next 29 months. With chairman Lionel Pickering's increased frustration at no return on his investment, the purse strings were tightened and McFarland was unable to buy suitable replacements, instead blooding youth products such as Dean Sturridge, Russell Hoult and Lee Carsley to fill the gaps created by the departures. In the event Derby could only record a 9th-place finish and McFarland, in the knowledge his contract was not going to be renewed, said his goodbye's in the penultimate match of the season, a 2–1 home defeat at Southend United, ending a 28-year association with the club, broken only by a two-year spell as player-manager at Bradford City.

== Final league table ==
Pos	Team	Pld	W	D	L	GF	GA	GD	Pts
7	Watford	46	19	13	14	52	46	+6	70
8	Sheffield United	46	17	17	12	74	55	+19	68
9	Derby County	46	18	12	16	66	51	+15	66
10	Grimsby Town	46	17	14	15	62	56	+6	65
11	Stoke City	46	16	15	15	50	53	−3	63

Rules for classification: 1) Points; 2) Goals scored; 3) Goal difference

== Results ==
Derby County's score comes first

=== Legend ===
Win	Draw	Loss

=== Football League First Division ===
Date	Opponent	Venue	Result	Attendance	Scorers
13 August 1994	Barnsley	A	1–2	8,737	Pembridge
20 August 1994	Luton Town	H	0–0	13,060	
27 August 1994	Millwall	A	1–4	8,809	Sturridge
31 August 1994	Middlesbrough	H	0–1	14,659	
3 September 1994	Grimsby Town	H	2–1	12,027	Charles, Pembridge
11 September 1994	Swindon Town	A	1–1	9,054	Kitson
13 September 1994	Bristol City	A	2–0	8,029	Kitson, Carsley
17 September 1994	Oldham Athletic	H	2–1	13,746	Carsley, Short
25 September 1994	Stoke City	H	3–0	11,782	Hodge, Gabbiadini, Charles
1 October 1994	Bolton Wanderers	A	0–1	12,015	
8 October 1994	Watford	H	1–1	13,413	Hodge
16 October 1994	Southend United	A	0–1	12,317	
23 October 1994	Notts County	A	0–0	6,390	
29 October 1994	Charlton Athletic	H	2–2	12,588	Short, Johnson
2 November 1994	Reading	H	1–2	10,585	Gabbiadini
6 November 1994	Portsmouth	A	1–0	5,117	Gabbiadini
12 November 1994	Sheffield United	A	1–2	15,001	Simpson (pen)
19 November 1994	Port Vale	H	2–0	13,357	Johnson (2)
27 November 1994	Wolverhampton Wanderers	A	2–0	22,768	Johnson, Stallard
3 December 1994	Notts County	H	0–0	14,278	
11 December 1994	Luton Town	A	0–0	6,400	
17 December 1994	Barnsley	H	1–0	13,205	Johnson
26 December 1994	Tranmere Rovers	A	1–3	11,581	Johnson
31 December 1994	Sunderland	A	1–1	13,979	Johnson
2 January 1995	West Bromwich Albion	H	1–1	16,035	Trollope
14 January 1995	Charlton Athletic	A	4–3	9,389	Short, Stallard, Gabbiadini (2)
22 January 1995	Portsmouth	H	3–0	11,143	Simpson (3)
4 February 1995	Sheffield United	H	2–3	15,882	Kavanagh, Williams
11 February 1995	Reading	A	0–1	8,834	
21 February 1995	Port Vale	A	0–1	9,387	
26 February 1995	Bolton Wanderers	H	2–1	11,003	Yates, Mills
4 March 1995	Stoke City	A	0–0	13,462	
7 March 1995	Grimsby Town	A	1–0	5,310	Pembridge
11 March 1995	Millwall	H	3–2	12,490	Trollope, Pembridge, Gabbiaidini
15 March 1995	Burnley	H	4–0	13,922	Mills, Trollope, Gabbiadini, Simpson (pen)
18 March 1995	Middlesbrough	A	4–2	18,168	Mills (2), Gabbiadini, Pembridge
22 March 1995	Swindon Town	H	3–1	16,839	Simpson (pen), Pembridge, Mills
25 March 1995	Oldham Athletic	A	0–1	7,696	
1 April 1995	Bristol City	H	3–1	14,555	Gabbiadini, Williams, Wrack
8 April 1995	Sunderland	H	0–1	15,442	
12 April 1995	Wolverhampton Wanderers	H	3–3	16,040	Simpson (2), Gabbiadini
15 April 1995	Burnley	A	1–3	11,534	Trollope
17 April 1995	Tranmere Rovers	H	5–0	11,711	Pembridge (2), Mills, Gabbiadini, Williams
22 April 1995	West Bromwich Albion	A	0–0	15,265	
29 April 1995	Southend United	H	1–2	12,528	Mills
7 May 1995	Watford	A	1–2	8,492	Pembridge

=== FA Cup ===
Round	Date	Opponent	Venue	Result	Attendance	Goalscorers
R3	7 January 1995	Everton	A	0–1	29,406	

=== League Cup ===
Round	Date	Opponent	Venue	Result	Attendance	Goalscorers
R2 First Leg	20 September 1994	Reading	A	1–3	6,056	Gabbiadini
R2 Second Leg	28 September 1994	Reading	H	2–0 (won on away goals)	9,476	Gabbiadini, Williams
R3	26 October 1994	Portsmouth	A	1–0	8,568	Simpson
R4	30 November 1994	Swindon Town	A	1–2	8,920	Stallard

=== Anglo-Italian Cup ===
Round	Date	Opponent	Venue	Result	Attendance	Goalscorers
Group B	24 August 1994	Ancona	A	1–2	748	Pembridge
Group B	6 September 1994	A.C. Cesena	H	6–1	2,010	Hodge (2), Kitson (4)
Group B	5 October 1994	Piacenza	A	1–1	1,710	Williams
Group B	15 November 1994	Udinese	H	3–1	1,562	Johnson, Stallard

== Players ==
=== First-team squad ===
The following players all appeared for the first team this season.

Note: Flags indicate national team as defined under FIFA eligibility rules; some limited exceptions apply. Players may hold more than one non-FIFA nationality.

No.	Pos.	Nation	Player
—	GK	ENG	Steve Sutton
—	GK	ENG	Russell Hoult
—	GK	ENG	Martin Taylor
—	GK	ENG	Andy Quy
—	DF	ENG	Gary Charles
—	DF	ENG	Craig Short
—	DF	ENG	Paul Williams
—	DF	ENG	Darren Wassall
—	DF	ENG	Jason Kavanagh
—	DF	ENG	Dean Yates
—	DF	ENG	Michael Forsyth
—	DF	ENG	Shane Nicholson
—	DF	ENG	Chris Boden
—	DF	ENG	Wayne Sutton
—	DF	ENG	Will Davies
—	MF	ENG	Paul Simpson
—	MF	USA	John Harkes

No.	Pos.	Nation	Player
—	MF	WAL	Mark Pembridge
—	MF	ENG	Lee Carsley (Note: Carsley was born in Birmingham, England, but qualified to represent the Republic of Ireland internationally through his grandmother and represented them at U-21 and B level before making his international debut for Ireland in October 1997.)
—	MF	ENG	Paul Trollope (Note: Trollope was born in Swindon, England, but also qualified to represent Wales internationally and would make his international debut for Wales in May 1997.)
—	MF	ENG	Gordon Cowans
—	MF	ENG	Steve Hodge (on loan from Leeds United)
—	MF	ENG	Martin Kuhl
—	MF	ENG	Steve Hayward
—	MF	ENG	Darren Wrack
—	MF	ENG	Ian Ashbee
—	MF	ENG	Kevin Cooper
—	FW	ENG	Marco Gabbiadini
—	FW	ENG	Tommy Johnson
—	FW	ENG	Lee Mills
—	FW	ENG	Mark Stallard
—	FW	ENG	Paul Kitson
—	FW	ENG	Dean Sturridge

=== Reserve team ===
The following players did not appear for the first team this season.

Note: Flags indicate national team as defined under FIFA eligibility rules; some limited exceptions apply. Players may hold more than one non-FIFA nationality.

No. / Pos. / Nation / Player; — / DF / ENG / Andrew Tretton	No. / Pos. / Nation / Player; — / FW / ENG / Nick Wright
