= 1986–87 Derby County F.C. season =

Derby County
1986-87 season
- Chairman: Robert Maxwell
- Manager: Arthur Cox
- Stadium: Baseball Ground
- Second Division: 1st
- FA Cup: First round
- League Cup: Third round
- Top goalscorer: League: Bobby Davison (19); All: Bobby Davison (22)
- Highest home attendance: 21,485 vs. Portsmouth 4 March 1987
- Lowest home attendance: 8,531 vs.Chester City 27 August 1986
- Average home league attendance: 15,237
Home colours	Away colours	Third colours

The 1986–87 season was the 89th season of association football in the Football League played by Derby County F.C., an English football club based in Derby, Derbyshire. Their third-place finish in the 1985–86 season meant they were promoted to the second tier. Arthur Cox was the manager for his third season in charge. Derby won the Second Division in this season.

== Overview ==
Derby County played in three competitions in the 1986-87 season. The Football League Second Division, FA Cup, and Football League Cup.

The league season started on 23 August 1986 and finished on 9 May 1987. Derby finished first in the Second Division and won promotion to the First Division for the following season.

They entered the FA Cup in the first round of the FA Cup and lost 1-0 to Sheffield Wednesday on 26 January 1987.

Derby entered the League Cup in the first round and were knocked out of the League Cup in the third round by Aston Villa, losing 2-1.

== Players ==
Position	Nationality	Name
GK	(England)	Mark Wallington
GK	(England)	Eric Steele
GK	(England)	Martin Taylor
DF	(England)	Rob Hindmarch
DF	(England)	Richard Pratley
DF	(England)	Paul Blades
DF	(England)	Mike Forsyth
DF	(England)	David Linighan
DF	(England)	Ross MacLaren
DF	(England)	Graham Harbey
DF	(England)	Mel Sage
MF	(England)	Mark Lillis
MF	(England)	John Gregory
MF	(England)	Gary Micklewhite
MF	(England)	David Penney
MF	(Wales)	Geraint Williams
MF	(England)	Mickey Lewis
MF	(England)	Steve McClaren
MF	(England)	Steve Cross
FW	(England)	Nigel Callaghan
FW	(Republic of Ireland)	Jeff Chandler
FW	(England)	Andy Garner
FW	(England)	Bobby Davison
FW	(England)	Phil Gee

== Kit ==
The kit for this season was manufactured by sportswear company OSCA. The home kit was traditional white, but with yellow and blue trim on the collar and arms. The away kit had light and dark blue vertical stripes.

The main sponsor for the kit was Sportsweek. This was the only season they sponsored the shirt. By the end of the season Sportsweek had closed down and chairman Robert Maxwell's BPCC took over as shirt sponsor.

Home	Away

== Results ==
=== Second Division ===
vs.

=== League Cup ===
27 August 1986 First Round, 1st Leg	Derby County	0-1	Chester City	Baseball Ground
		Report		Attendance: 8,531

3 September 1986 First Round, 2nd Leg	Chester City	1-2 (2-2a agg.)	Derby County	Sealand Road
		Report	Davison; Gee	Attendance: 4,012

24 September 1986 Second Round, 1st Leg	Derby County	4-1	West Bromwich Albion	Baseball Ground
	Chandler; Davison; Davison; Micklewhite	Report		Attendance: 11,304

7 October 1986 Second Round, 2nd Leg	West Bromwich Albion	0-1 (1-5 agg.)	Derby County	The Hawthorns
		Report	Gee	Attendance: 6,765

29 October 1986 Third Round	Derby County	1-1	Aston Villa	Baseball Ground
	Harbey	Report	Daley	Attendance: 19,374

4 November 1986 Third Round replay	Aston Villa	2-1	Derby County	Villa Park
	Thompson; Birch	Report	Williams	Attendance: 19,477

=== FA Cup ===
vs.
