= Paul Williams (footballer, born 1971) =

English footballer and manager

Personal information
- Full name: Paul Darren Williams
- Date of birth: 26 March 1971 (age 55)
- Place of birth: Burton upon Trent, England
- Height: 6 ft 0 in (1.83 m)
- Positions: Centre back; midfielder

Youth career
- Derby County

Senior career*
Years	Team	Apps	(Gls)
1989–1995	Derby County	160	(26)
1989	→ Lincoln City (loan)	3	(0)
1995–2001	Coventry City	169	(5)
2001	→ Southampton (loan)	1	(0)
2001–2003	Southampton	39	(0)
2003–2005	Stoke City	19	(0)
2005	Richmond Kickers	5	(0)
Total		395	(31)

International career
1991	England U21	6	(0)

Managerial career
- 2006–2007: Fredericksburg Gunners
- 2016: Nottingham Forest (caretaker)
- 2016: England U20 (caretaker)
- 2021: England U18
- * Club domestic league appearances and goals

Paul Darren Williams (born 26 March 1971) is an English professional football coach and former player who was until August 2022 academy director at Birmingham City.

As a player, he was a centre back and midfielder from 1989 until 2005, playing domestically for Derby County, Lincoln City, Coventry City, Southampton and Stoke City and in the USL A-League for Richmond Kickers.

Upon his retirement he moved into coaching, working in the academies at Southampton, Wolverhampton Wanderers, Norwich City, Birmingham City and with the England youth teams. He served Nottingham Forest as caretaker manager late in the 2015–16 season. He has also managed Fredericksburg Gunners and has worked on the coaching staff of Swansea City, Brentford, Aldershot Town and Sheffield Wednesday.

== Club career ==
=== Derby County ===
Born in Burton upon Trent, Williams began his career as a forward with First Division club Derby County and after moving back into midfield he made his debut during the 1989–90 season, making 10 appearances and scoring his first goal for the club. By 1991, Derby had been relegated to the Second Division and Williams stepped up to score league 13 goals during the 1991–92 season, including a memorable hattrick in a 3–1 victory over Watford on 29 February 1992. His goals helped the Rams to a place in the playoffs, but the club's season ended after defeat to Blackburn Rovers in the semi-finals.

By 1993, Williams had been converted into a central defender and he helped the team to 1994 First Division playoff Final, but Derby were denied a place in the Premier League by Leicester City and he found himself partly at fault for one of the Foxes' goals. He remained at the Baseball Ground until the end of the 1994–95 season, when a 9th-place finish saw Derby fail to qualify for the playoffs. Williams made 195 appearances and scored 33 goals during six seasons with the Rams.

==== Lincoln City (loan) ====
Williams joined Fourth Division club Lincoln City on loan on 9 November 1989 and made the first professional appearances of his career in a six-match spell at Sincil Bank.

=== Coventry City ===
Williams moved up to the Premier League to sign with Coventry City in August 1995 for a £750,000 fee. (A different Paul Williams was on Coventry's books the previous season.) He was the Highfield Road club's Player of the Year in his debut season and remained at the club for a further five years before being released in September 2001. Williams made 199 appearances and scored six goals for Coventry City, including the winner in a 2–1 victory over Tottenham Hotspur on the final day of the 1996–97 season, which preserved the Sky Blues' Premier League status.

=== Southampton ===
Williams reunited with his former Coventry City manager Gordon Strachan at Premier League club Southampton on 26 October 2001, signing on a short-term loan with a view to a permanent move. He made his debut the following day as a first half substitute for Claus Lundekvam during a 2–1 defeat to Fulham. After signing on a permanent deal the following week, Williams was a near ever-present during the remainder of the 2001–02 season, making 30 appearances. Injuries disrupted Williams' 2002–03 season, which proved to be a memorable campaign for the Saints, reaching the 2003 FA Cup Final (qualifying for the UEFA Cup) and finishing 8th in the Premier League. Williams' final involvement with the first team was as an unused substitute during the Cup Final, which was lost 1–0 to Arsenal. Williams was released in June 2003, after making 43 appearances during two seasons at St Mary's.

=== Stoke City ===
After angering Walsall manager Colin Lee by reneging on a deal in principle to join the First Division club for the 2003–04 season, Williams joined rivals Stoke City on 18 August 2003. He made 20 appearances during the 2003–04 season and injuries reduced his appearances to none in 2004–05, which led to his release on 1 February 2005.

=== Later years ===
In April 2005, Williams joined USL First Division club Richmond Kickers, where he made five appearances in a short spell. In October 2006, it was announced that Williams had joined Midland Alliance club Rocester, but the deal collapsed.

== International career ==
Williams won six caps for the England U21 team in 1991. He made three appearances at the 1991 Toulon Tournament, started in a 2–1 friendly victory over Germany and played in two 1992 European U21 Championship qualifiers.

== Managerial and coaching career ==
Williams was announced as head coach of USL Premier Development League expansion club Fredericksburg Gunners in December 2006. He was replaced by Cristian Neagu in February 2007, before the 2007 season began.

Williams served as a youth development coach at Championship club Wolverhampton Wanderers between 2006 and 2008.

On 14 October 2009, Williams was installed as assistant to caretaker manager and former Southampton teammate Jason Dodd at League Two club Aldershot Town. The pair presided over four matches and departed after a 2–0 FA Cup second round victory over Bury on 7 November.

Williams re-joined former club Southampton as a part-time youth coach at the club's academy in 2009 and was promoted to the full-time role of Youth Development Coach in July 2011. He managed the U13 team, served as assistant to U18 manager Jason Dodd and coached specialist sessions for teams between U14 and U18 level. Dodd and Williams were dismissed from their roles on 20 May 2014. Dodd and Williams presided over a productive era for the Saints academy, with future England 2014 World Cup squad member Luke Shaw and Premier League starters Calum Chambers, James Ward-Prowse, Harrison Reed, and Sam Gallagher graduating.

Williams was first team coach at Hampshire Premier League club Team Solent during the 2010–11 season.

Williams was announced as assistant manager/first team coach under Ian Baird at Conference South club Eastleigh on 2 June 2011. On 1 July, it was announced that Williams had left the club.

Williams linked up with Jason Dodd as part of the backroom team at Conference South club Gosport Borough in January 2015. He left the club at the end of the 2014–15 season.

In July 2015, Williams joined Championship club Brentford as logistics manager and became assistant to new head coach and former Derby County and Coventry City teammate Lee Carsley on 28 September. After the appointment of Dean Smith as the Bees' new head coach two months later, Williams was replaced as assistant by Richard O'Kelly and reverted to a coaching role with the Development Squad. He left the club in December 2015.

On 28 July 2015, Williams was announced as an assistant coach with the England U15 and U16 teams. He later became assistant to England U20 manager Aidy Boothroyd early in the 2016–17 season and took over as interim manager of the team in September 2016. He managed the U20s to victory in the 2016 Four Nations tournament and to a runners-up finish in the 2016 Continental Cup and left the role in mid-November 2016. Williams was appointed temporary U18 head coach for a training camp and friendly match versus Wales U18 in September 2021.

On 17 December 2015, Williams was named first team coach at Championship club Nottingham Forest. On 13 March 2016, he was named manager until the end of the 2015–16 season, following the termination of Dougie Freedman's contract on the same day. Williams took charge of his first game two days later, a 1–1 draw away to Hull City. He guided the club to a 16th-place finish and departed the City Ground on 12 May 2016.

Williams joined Premier League club Swansea City as assistant to manager Bob Bradley on 16 November 2016. Following Bradley's sacking and the appointment of Paul Clement as manager on 3 January 2017, Williams was placed on gardening leave.

On 18 September 2017, Williams joined Championship club Birmingham City as assistant first team coach. With the club in the relegation zone, he left the club when manager Steve Cotterill was sacked in March 2018.

Between July 2018 and August 2019, Williams served as assistant to Guyana head coach Michael Johnson. The pair qualified the team for its first-ever CONCACAF Gold Cup.

Between September 2018 and January 2019, Williams served Championship club West Bromwich Albion as an opposition scout. On 21 January 2019, Williams was appointed head coach of Championship club Norwich City's U18 team. He departed the role for personal reasons in February 2020. In February 2020, Williams joined Phoenix Sport & Media and took a consultancy role "to help educate and guide players to deal with off-pitch matters including mental health and financial education".

On 1 March 2021, Williams joined Championship club Sheffield Wednesday as first team coach under new manager Darren Moore. He left the club for personal reasons on 20 July 2021. He spent the 2021–22 season as Birmingham City's academy director.

On 23 August 2024, Williams joined Ben Futcher's interim backroom staff with the England U21s.

== Career statistics ==
Appearances and goals by club, season and competition
Club	Season	League			National Cup		League Cup		Other		Total	
Club	Season	Division	Apps	Goals	Apps	Goals	Apps	Goals	Apps	Goals	Apps	Goals
Derby County	1989–90	First Division	10	1	—		0	0	0	0	10	1
Derby County	1990–91	First Division	19	4	0	0	1	0	1 (Note: Appearance in Full Members Cup)	0	21	4
Derby County	1991–92	Second Division	41	13	3	2	3	1	3 (Note: 2 appearances in Football League playoffs, 1 appearance in Full Members Cup)	0	50	16
Derby County	1992–93	First Division	19	4	3	1	0	0	5 (Note: Appearances in Anglo-Italian Cup)	1	27	6
Derby County	1993–94	First Division	34	1	1	0	3	0	4 (Note: 3 appearances in Football League playoffs, 1 appearance in Anglo-Italian Cup)	0	42	1
Derby County	1994–95	First Division	37	3	1	0	4	1	2	1	44	5
Derby County	Total		160	26	8	3	11	2	15	2	194	33
Lincoln City (loan)	1989–90	Fourth Division	3	0	2	0	—		1 (Note: Appearance in Football League Trophy)	0	6	0
Coventry City	1995–96	Premier League	32	2	1	0	4	1	—		37	2
Coventry City	1996–97	Premier League	32	2	4	0	2	0	—		38	2
Coventry City	1997–98	Premier League	20	0	1	0	4	0	—		25	0
Coventry City	1998–99	Premier League	22	0	2	0	2	0	—		26	0
Coventry City	1999–2000	Premier League	28	1	3	0	1	0	—		32	1
Coventry City	2000–01	Premier League	30	0	2	0	4	0	—		36	0
Coventry City	2001–02	First Division	5	0	—		0	0	—		5	0
Coventry City	Total		169	5	13	0	17	0	—		199	5
Southampton	2001–02	Premier League	28	0	1	0	1	0	—		30	0
Southampton	2002–03	Premier League	11	0	1	0	0	0	—		12	0
Southampton	Total		39	0	2	0	1	0	—		42	0
Stoke City	2003–04	First Division	19	0	0	0	1	0	—		20	0
Stoke City	2004–05	Championship	0	0	0	0	0	0	—		0	0
Stoke City	Total		19	0	0	0	1	0	—		20	0
Richmond Kickers	2005	USL First Division	5	0	—		—		—		5	0
Career total			395	31	25	3	30	3	16	2	466	39

== Managerial statistics ==
As of match played 12 November 2016

Managerial record by team and tenure
Team	From	To	Record					Ref
Team	From	To	P	W	D	L	Win %	Ref
Nottingham Forest (caretaker)	13 March 2016	12 May 2016	10	2	4	4	20.0	
England U20 (caretaker)	September 2016	November 2016	6	5	0	1	83.3	
Total			16	7	4	5	43.8	—

== Honours ==
=== Player ===
Southampton

- FA Cup runner-up: 2002–03

=== Manager ===
England U20

- Four Nations Tournament: 2016

=== Individual ===
- Coventry City Player of the Year: 1995–96
