= Peter Shilton =

English footballer (born 1949)

Peter Shilton CBE
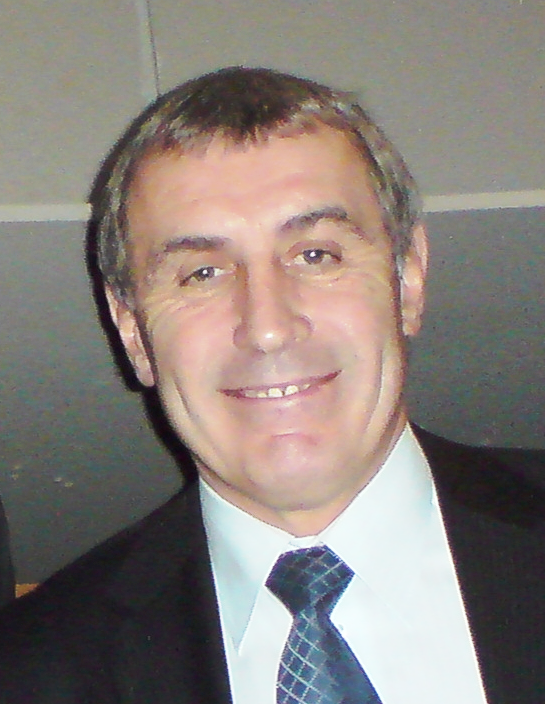
- Shilton in 2008

Personal information
- Full name: Peter Leslie Shilton
- Date of birth: 18 September 1949 (age 77)
- Place of birth: Leicester, England
- Height: 6 ft 0 in (1.83 m)
- Position: Goalkeeper

Youth career
- 1963–1966: Leicester City

Senior career*
Years	Team	Apps	(Gls)
1966–1974	Leicester City	286	(1)
1974–1977	Stoke City	110	(0)
1977–1982	Nottingham Forest	202	(0)
1982–1987	Southampton	188	(0)
1987–1992	Derby County	175	(0)
1992–1995	Plymouth Argyle	34	(0)
1995	Wimbledon	0	(0)
1995	Bolton Wanderers	1	(0)
1995–1996	Coventry City	0	(0)
1996	West Ham United	0	(0)
1996–1997	Leyton Orient	9	(0)
Total		1,005	(1)

International career
1965	England U16	1	(0)
1967	England U18	9	(0)
1968–1972	England U23	13	(0)
1970–1990	England	125	(0)

Managerial career
- 1992–1995: Plymouth Argyle
- * Club domestic league appearances and goals

Peter Leslie Shilton (born 18 September 1949) is an English former professional footballer who played as a goalkeeper.

Shilton's 31-year career included spells at 11 clubs and he has the unique distinction of playing over 1,000 English league games, including in excess of 100 for five clubs. During his time at Nottingham Forest, he won many honours, including two European Cups, a European Super Cup, the First Division championship, and the Football League Cup.

Shilton represented England at the FIFA World Cup in 1982, 1986 (where Diego Maradona scored two infamous goals against him) and 1990, and the UEFA European Championship in 1980 and 1988. Despite not making his World Cup finals debut until the age of 32, Shilton played in 17 finals matches, and shares the record of 10 clean sheets in World Cup finals matches with French goalkeeper Fabien Barthez.

Shilton holds the record for matches played in the English Football League and the Football League Cup and held the all-time record for the most competitive appearances in world football (1,387) until 2025. With 125 international caps, he held the record as England's most-capped male player until November 2026 when he was overtaken by Harry Kane. The IFFHS ranked Shilton among the top ten goalkeepers of the 20th century in 2000.

== Club career ==
=== Leicester City ===
Shilton was a 13-year-old pupil at King Richard III Boys School in Leicester, when he started training at schoolboy level with his local club Leicester City in 1963. He caught the eye of first-team goalkeeper Gordon Banks, who commented to the coach about how promising he was.

In May 1966, a 16-year-old Shilton made his debut for Leicester against Everton and his potential was quickly recognized to the point that the Leicester City management sided with their teenage prodigy and soon sold World Cup winner Banks to Stoke City. Shilton settled into first team life thereafter, even managing to score a goal at The Dell against Southampton in October 1967 direct from a clearance at the opposite end of the pitch; the Southampton goalkeeper Campbell Forsyth misjudged Shilton's long punt upfield, which, instead of splashing harmlessly in the mud, spun off the pitch and flew over Forsyth's head into the goal. Leicester won the game 5–1.

The following season, 1968-69, Leicester had a mixed season, suffering relegation from the First Division (they were promoted back to the top tier as champions two seasons later) but reaching the FA Cup Final at Wembley; 19-year-old Shilton became one of the event's youngest-ever goalkeepers. It did not go his way, however, as a single goal from Manchester City's Neil Young early in the match was enough to win the game. Despite the many honours and accolades which were to come Shilton's way, he would not appear in an FA Cup Final again. He reached the semi-finals with Leicester in 1974, but Liverpool won the match after a replay.

=== Stoke City ===
Shilton joined Stoke City in November 1974 for £325,000, a world record for a goalkeeper at that time. Shilton played in 26 matches for Stoke in 1974–75 as they narrowly missed out on the league title. He was an ever-present in 1975–76 playing in all of the club's 48 fixtures that season. However, in January 1976 a severe storm caused considerable damage to the Victoria Ground and to pay for the repair work Stoke had to sell off their playing staff. The summer of 1976 saw Manchester United lodge a bid for Shilton. Stoke agreed a fee of £275,000 for the goalkeeper, but they could not agree on Shilton's wage demands, which would have made him the highest paid player at the club. He remained with Stoke in 1976–77 and a young and inexperienced side suffered relegation to the Second Division. He was sold to Nottingham Forest in September 1977.

=== Nottingham Forest ===
Nottingham Forest made an offer of £250,000 and Shilton signed a month into the new season. Forest had just been promoted to the First Division and were riding high under the management of Brian Clough. They won the League Cup in a replay after initially drawing with Liverpool at Wembley, though Shilton played no part as he was cup-tied, and then won the League title in their first season back in the First Division. Shilton made a save in the clinching 0–0 draw against Coventry City which critics regarded among his greatest ever – a vicious close-range header from Mick Ferguson seemed destined for the net with Shilton slightly out of position, but he got across to palm it over the bar. During the season as a whole, Shilton conceded just 18 goals in 37 league appearances. Shilton subsequently won the PFA Players' Player of the Year award, voted for by his fellow professionals.

Forest won the League Cup again in 1979 – this time Shilton played as they defeated Southampton 3–2 at Wembley – before reaching the European Cup final where a Trevor Francis goal was enough to beat Swedish side Malmö in Munich. Shilton had another eventful season with Forest, reaching a third consecutive League Cup final, with Wolverhampton Wanderers the opponents at Wembley. There was no third successive victory, however, a communication error between Shilton and defender David Needham resulted in a collision on the edge of the Forest penalty area, leaving Andy Gray free to tap the ball into the net for the game's only goal.

Forest then reached the European Cup final again in 1980 – as holders they were entitled to defend the trophy and faced SV Hamburg in Madrid. Like the 1979 final, the game was tight and one goal settled it from Forest winger John Robertson. Among the disappointed Hamburg players was Kevin Keegan, now Shilton's captain at international level.

Life began to decline for Shilton afterwards. Forest failed to continue their trophy-winning form while Shilton began what would be a long-standing gambling addiction which would cause considerable strain to his family. There were also stories of an extramarital affair and a conviction for drink-driving, with the player fined £350 for the offence. All of this contributed to Shilton's decision to leave Nottingham Forest in 1982 and start afresh.

=== Southampton ===
Shilton left Forest for Southampton, where his former international teammate Alan Ball was playing. Shilton suffered FA Cup semi-final defeat again in 1984 when he was beaten by a last minute Adrian Heath header which gave Everton a place in the final; and again in 1986 when Liverpool beat Southampton 2–0. He joined Derby County in the summer of 1987.

He was the subject of This Is Your Life in March 1986 when he was surprised by Eamonn Andrews at London Waterloo station.

=== Derby County ===
Shilton helped the Derby side of Mark Wright, Dean Saunders and Ted McMinn finish fifth in the league, and they only missed out on competing in the UEFA Cup due to the ban on English clubs in European competition (which ran from 1985 to 1990) arising from the Heysel disaster. In 1991, Derby were relegated and Shilton started to consider his playing future. He was 42 years old and was ready to become a coach or manager. In early 1991, he had rejected an offer to replace Stan Ternent as Hull City manager for geographical reasons.

=== Later career ===
Shilton finally left Derby in February 1992 on accepting an offer to become player-manager of Plymouth Argyle – a turbulent era that is documented in the 2009 book, Peter Shilton's Nearly Men. Plymouth were battling against relegation in the Football League Second Division but Shilton's efforts were unable to save Plymouth from the drop. His £300,000 record signing Peter Swan proved to be a disaster as the player had an awful relationship with both his teammates and the fans.

In 1994, he started to concentrate solely on management and Plymouth reached the Division Two play-offs, but lost in the semi-finals to Burnley. In January 1994, he had been linked with Southampton for a possible return as manager following the departure of Ian Branfoot, but the job went to Alan Ball instead. The following February, with Plymouth heading for relegation, he left the club and announced his intention to start playing again. He was now 45 years old.

He joined Wimbledon in the Premier League for a short period, as injury cover for the first choice goalkeeper Hans Segers, but did not play a first team game for them. He subsequently signed for Bolton Wanderers, making a couple of appearances, including the Division One play-off semi final against Wolverhampton Wanderers at Molineux. Bolton lost 2–1, but eventually overcame Wolves in the second leg, Shilton however did not play in this game; Keith Branagan did instead. He then signed for Coventry City, where he failed to make a first-team appearance, before joining West Ham United, where again he never played a first-team game, although he was selected as a substitute on several occasions.

With 996 Football League matches to his name, Shilton was anxious to reach 1,000 and he did when he joined Leyton Orient in November 1996, in an exchange deal for 39-year-old Les Sealey. His thousandth League game came on 22 December 1996, against Brighton & Hove Albion, which was screened live on Sky Sports and was preceded by the presentation from the Football League of a special edition of the Guinness Book of Records to Shilton. He played five more matches before retiring on 1,005 league games at the age of 47 at the end of the 1996–97 season. By the time of his retirement, he was the fifth oldest player ever to have played in the Football League or Premier League. Shilton recovered from financial troubles caused by business decisions and gambling, and became a prolific after-dinner speaker.

== International career ==
=== Early career ===
Despite playing at a lower level, Shilton impressed England manager Alf Ramsey sufficiently to give him his debut against East Germany in November 1970, which England won 3–1. Little more than six months later, Leicester were promoted back to the First Division. His second England cap came in a goalless draw against Wales at Wembley; and his first competitive match for his country was his third appearance as England drew 1–1 with Switzerland in a qualifying game for the 1972 European Championships. At this stage, Banks was still England's first choice keeper, but the remaining brace of back-ups from the 1970 World Cup, Peter Bonetti and Alex Stepney, had been cast aside by Ramsey so Shilton could begin to regard himself as his country's number two goalkeeper at the age of 22.

Shilton's fourth and fifth England caps came towards the end of 1972, before a tragic incident suddenly saw Shilton propelled into the limelight as England's number one keeper. In October 1972, Gordon Banks was involved in a car crash which resulted in the loss of the sight in one eye and thus ended his career. Liverpool goalkeeper Ray Clemence was called up to make his debut a month later for England's opening qualifier for the 1974 World Cup, (a 1–0 win over Wales). Shilton ended up with over 100 caps compared to Clemence's 61.

In the summer of 1973, Shilton kept three clean sheets as England defeated Northern Ireland, Wales and Scotland. Against Scotland, Shilton made a right handed save diving to his left from Kenny Dalglish's shot that Shilton considered among his best saves. While drawing with Czechoslovakia earned Shilton his tenth cap – as a warm-up to a crucial World Cup qualifier against Poland in Chorzów a week later. This went badly for England, with Shilton unable to stop both goals in a 2–0 defeat and therefore making victory in the final qualifier, against the same opposition at Wembley four months later, a necessity if England were to make the finals. A perceived blunder by Shilton in this match led to a crucial goal by Jan Domarski for Poland, Shilton's night contrasting with the performance of Polish goalkeeper Jan Tomaszewski, who, though famously derided as "a clown" by Brian Clough (later Shilton's manager at Nottingham Forest), made a string of crucial saves as Poland got the draw they needed to qualify for the 1974 World Cup at England's expense. Regarding the incident, Shilton commented: "I tried to make the perfect save. Had I been more experienced, I'd have stuck a foot or knee out."

This experience perhaps led incoming England manager Don Revie to favour Ray Clemence in his selections. In 1975, Clemence won eight of the nine caps available, though England failed to reach the 1976 European Championships during this period. From 1977 new manager Ron Greenwood started to select Shilton as regularly as Clemence, eventually reaching the stage where he made a point of alternating them, seemingly unable to choose. This indecision attracted some adverse comment, with some commentators questioning Greenwood's ability to manage at the highest level. Shilton then featured heavily as England qualified for the 1980 European Championships in Italy – their first tournament for a decade. Shilton had won his 30th England cap in a 2–0 win over Spain in March 1980; his 31st would not come until the European Championship. It was a 1–0 defeat to Italy, which proved crucial as England failed to get through to the knockout phase.

=== 1982 FIFA World Cup ===
In the midst of Shilton's issues, he had the 1982 World Cup to consider. Shilton had played in half of the qualifying games in England's group, UEFA group four UEFA group four – home wins over Norway, and Switzerland, a goalless draw against Romania, and a vital 1–0 win over Hungary. The latter was the last game of the campaign, and in spite of England's previous away defeat against Norway, famously mocked by Norwegian commentator Bjørge Lillelien, results elsewhere meant that a draw would be sufficient for Shilton and England to avoid a repeat of the elimination at the qualification stage they had experienced eight years previously. The result went England's way this time and they qualified for their first World Cup for a dozen years, with Shilton appearing in the finals in Spain for the first time at the comparatively mature age of 32.

Clemence had played in the friendlies building up to the competition, but it was Shilton who was selected for the opening group game against France in Bilbao. England won 3–1 and Shilton stayed in goal for the two remaining group games, three wins meaning England advanced to the second phase as group winners.

=== UEFA Euro 1984 and 1986 FIFA World Cup qualifiers ===
With Bobby Robson now running the England team, Shilton's international career flourished, playing in Robson's first ten matches and even captaining the side in seven of them in the absence of Bryan Robson and Ray Wilkins. One game, a 2–0 win over Scotland, earned Shilton his 50th cap.

Clemence returned for a qualifier for the 1984 European Championships against Luxembourg, but this game, Clemence's 61st for his country, also proved to be his last.

England failed to qualify for the European Championships. However, he was now the established first pick goalkeeper for his country, and would remain so through to the end of his international career. Almost half his international caps (61 out of 125) were earned after his 35th birthday. It was 1985 before another goalkeeper was selected for an England game, when Robson could give a debut to the Manchester United goalkeeper Gary Bailey in a relatively unimportant friendly match. Shilton was still the keeper for the qualifying campaign for the 1986 World Cup, which thus far had seen three wins from three matches and no goals conceded.

A 70th cap came Shilton's way in a 1–0 defeat against Scotland at Hampden Park; he later saved a penalty from Andy Brehme as England beat West Germany 3–0 in a tour match in Mexico, a year before England were hoping to return there for the World Cup.

England accomplished going through the whole qualifying campaign undefeated. By the time they played Mexico in an acclimatisation match prior to the competition, Shilton was 80 games into his England career, having beaten Banks' record for a goalkeeper of 73 caps the previous year against Turkey.

=== 1986 FIFA World Cup ===
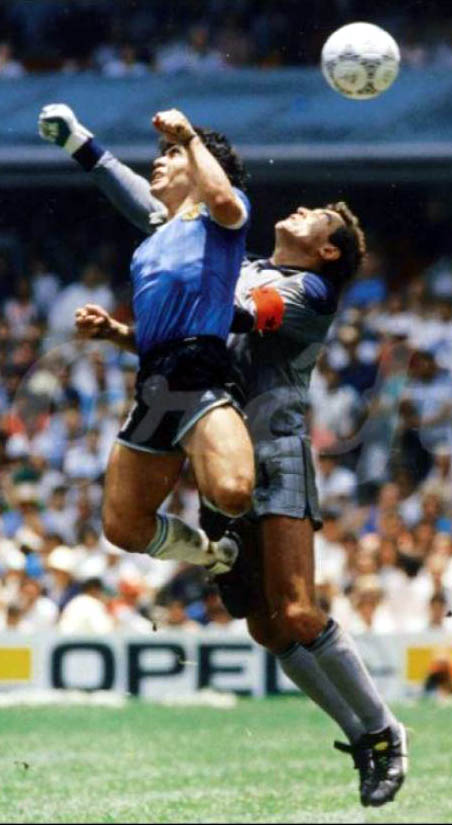
Shilton beaten to the ball, as Diego Maradona scores with his fist, later dubbed "the hand of God"

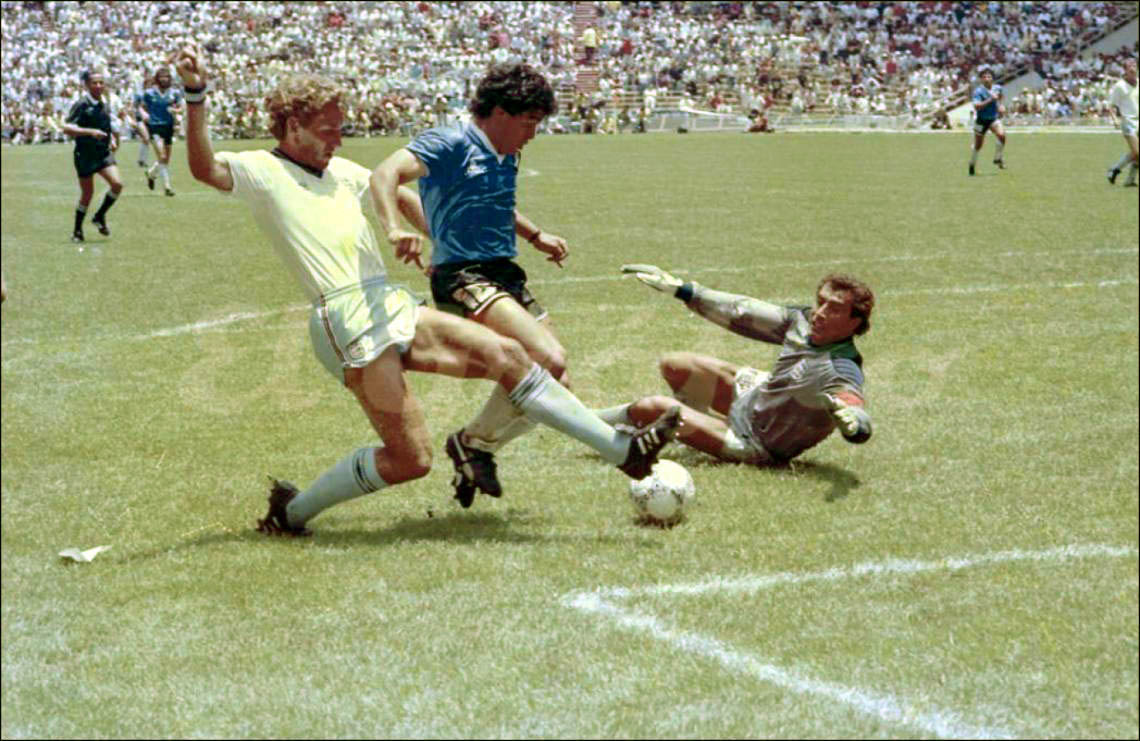
Shilton watches as Maradona rounds him to score his second goal of the match, deemed "The Goal of the Century".

At the World Cup itself, England started slowly, losing the opening group match to Portugal and then drawing against outsiders Morocco, during which time Robson was led off injured and Wilkins was sent off. In their absences, Shilton was handed the captaincy as England found their form to defeat Poland 3–0 in their final group game – Gary Lineker scored them all – and progress to the second round.

There they met Paraguay and though Shilton did have to make one fingertip save during the first half, England were rarely troubled. Lineker scored twice and Peter Beardsley once as England went through 3–0 and into a quarter final meeting with Argentina, a match which again would ultimately form part of the legend of Shilton's whole career.

Argentina captain Diego Maradona had been the man of the tournament thus far, but in a tight first half England managed to keep his creativity reasonably at bay. But early in the second half, Maradona changed the game, much to Shilton's anger.

Maradona began an attack which seemingly broke down on the edge of the England box as Steve Hodge got a foot to the ball. The ball was skewed back towards the penalty area and Maradona, continuing the run from his initial pass, went after it as Shilton came out to punch the ball clear. Maradona managed to punch the ball over Shilton and into the net. Shilton and his teammates signalled that Maradona had used his hand – a foul for any player except a goalkeeper – but the Tunisian referee Ali Bin Nasser allowed the goal. A photograph subsequently showed Maradona outjumping Shilton and his fist clearly making contact with the ball as Shilton was still midway through his own stretch, arm extended (having not anticipated Maradona's action). Maradona later said the goal was scored by the Hand of God. Nasser never refereed at such a high level again, having missed such a blatant infringement.

Shortly afterwards, Maradona scored a legitimate individual goal, taking on almost the whole England defence and Shilton before shooting into an empty net. In 2002, the goal was voted "Goal of the Century" as part of the buildup to the 2002 FIFA World Cup tournament on the FIFA website. Lineker pulled one back and nearly equalised in the closing seconds, but England were out.

=== UEFA Euro 1988 ===
However, Shilton continued to play for England, featuring in a straightforward and successful qualification campaign for the 1988 European Championships, which were to be held in West Germany.

Shilton had won his 90th cap for England in a 2–0 win over Northern Ireland in a European Championship qualifier.

Shilton's 99th cap came in England's first game in group 2 at the Championship finals. This game ended in a 1–0 defeat to the Republic of Ireland with Shilton beaten by an early Ray Houghton header. Shilton's 100th was against the Netherlands, who had also lost their first game at the finals. Marco van Basten eliminated England from the tournament with a hat-trick as England lost this match 3–1. Robson left Shilton out of the third and final group game as it was now meaningless, but England still lost it, also 3–1. Chris Woods, longtime understudy to Shilton (and his teenage understudy a decade earlier at Forest – he had played in the League Cup final when Shilton was cup-tied) was given a rare game.

=== 1990 FIFA World Cup ===
Shilton played in all bar one of the England games over the next 18 months – the one he missed saw a debut for a future England goalkeeping first choice, David Seaman of Queens Park Rangers. In June 1989, Shilton broke his old England skipper Bobby Moore's record of 108 appearances for his country when he won his 109th cap in a friendly against Denmark in Copenhagen. Prior to the match he was handed a framed England goalkeeper's jersey with '109' on the front. He had, by this time, kept three clean sheets in three qualifying matches for the 1990 World Cup and would ultimately concede no goals at all as England qualified for the tournament, to be held in Italy.

Shilton was the oldest player at the 1990 World Cup and the last born in the 1940s. His 119th appearance for his country saw England draw 1–1 with the Republic of Ireland in the opening group game; England got through the group, beat Belgium 1–0 in the second round match, and then edged past Cameroon 3–2 in the quarter-finals, thanks to two Lineker penalties after England went 2–1 down. Then came the West Germans in the semi-finals, Shilton's 124th England game.

It was goalless at half time, but shortly after the restart Shilton was beaten by Andreas Brehme's deflected free kick that looped off Paul Parker's shin and dropped into the net over Shilton's head, despite his back pedalling attempts to tip the ball over. Lineker's late equaliser salvaged a draw for England but Shilton could not get close enough to any of the penalties taken by the Germans in the deciding shoot out, while England missed two of theirs and went out of the tournament.

Shilton was the keeper for the third place play-off game, which ended in a 2–1 win for hosts Italy, Shilton suffering an embarrassing moment when he dithered over a back pass and was tackled by Roberto Baggio who scored as a result of Shilton's error. It was his 125th appearance for his country and, after the tournament ended, he announced it would be his last. His final appearance came just four months before the 20th anniversary of his international debut, making his full international career one of the longest on record. He was never booked or sent off at full international level.

== Style of play ==
Shilton was considered by pundits to be one of the best goalkeepers in the world in his prime and as one of England's greatest players ever in his position. In 2024, he was ranked by FourFourTwo at number 17 in the "best goalkeepers ever". Shilton was an intelligent and efficient goalkeeper, who was regarded above all for his physical presence, handling, positional sense, composure and consistency, as well as his ability to communicate with his teammates, organise his defence, and inspire confidence in his back-line. He possessed significant physical strength, which made him an imposing presence in the area, despite not being the tallest of goalkeepers. He was known for his agility, and also possessed excellent reflexes, and good shot-stopping abilities. He was also known for his work-rate, mentality, discipline in training, and physical conditioning. He also stood out for his exceptional longevity throughout his career, which spanned four decades. He retired at the age of 47, having competed in over 1,000 professional matches.

Shilton drew criticism in the English media at times for his increasing lack of pace and agility with age in his later career which, along with his timing and relatively modest stature for a goalkeeper, is thought to have limited him when facing penalties, most noticeably in England's penalty shoot-out defeat to eventual champions West Germany in the 1990 World Cup semi-final; throughout his international career, his only penalty save came against Andreas Brehme of West Germany in 1985.

== Personal life ==
Shilton married Sue Flitcroft in September 1970, and the couple have two sons, Michael and Sam, who later became a professional footballer.

In December 2011, it was announced that Shilton had split from his wife after 40 years of marriage.

Shilton was charged with drink driving in March 2013, he was banned for 20 months and ordered to pay £1,020 costs.

In March 2015, it was announced that Shilton was to marry his second wife, jazz singer Stephanie Hayward, the pair having got engaged in 2014. The couple were married at the Parish of St Peter and St Paul Church in West Mersea, on 10 December 2016.

Shilton supported the UK's withdrawal from the European Union. In 2018, after his former England teammate Gary Lineker commented on a social media post by Shilton praising the Conservative politician Jacob Rees-Mogg, he challenged Lineker to engage in a television debate with him.

In January 2020, Shilton said that he had overcome a 45-year gambling addiction with the help of his wife, Steph. Shilton has worked with the UK government to raise awareness of associated issues including mental health problems.

Shilton was appointed Member of the Order of the British Empire (MBE) in the 1986 New Year Honours, Officer of the Order of the British Empire (OBE) in the 1991 New Year Honours, and Commander of the Order of the British Empire (CBE) in the 2024 New Year Honours for services to association football and the prevention of gambling harm.

== Career statistics ==
=== Club ===
Appearances and goals by club, season and competition
Club	Season	League			FA Cup		League Cup		Other (Note: Appearances and goals in the Anglo-Scottish Cup, European Cup, FA Charity Shield, Football League Trophy, Full Members Cup, Intercontinental Cup, Texaco Cup, Football League Super Cup, UEFA Cup, European Super Cup and Football League play-offs)		Total	
Club	Season	Division	Apps	Goals	Apps	Goals	Apps	Goals	Apps	Goals	Apps	Goals
Leicester City	1965–66	First Division	1	0	0	0	0	0	0	0	1	0
Leicester City	1966–67	First Division	4	0	0	0	0	0	0	0	4	0
Leicester City	1967–68	First Division	35	1	4	0	0	0	0	0	39	1
Leicester City	1968–69	First Division	42	0	8	0	3	0	0	0	53	0
Leicester City	1969–70	Second Division	39	0	5	0	7	0	0	0	51	0
Leicester City	1970–71	Second Division	40	0	5	0	5	0	0	0	50	0
Leicester City	1971–72	First Division	37	0	2	0	1	0	2	0	42	0
Leicester City	1972–73	First Division	41	0	2	0	1	0	3	0	47	0
Leicester City	1973–74	First Division	42	0	7	0	2	0	4	0	55	0
Leicester City	1974–75	First Division	5	0	0	0	1	0	0	0	6	0
Leicester City	Total		286	1	33	0	20	0	9	0	348	1
Stoke City	1974–75	First Division	25	0	1	0	0	0	0	0	26	0
Stoke City	1975–76	First Division	42	0	5	0	1	0	0	0	48	0
Stoke City	1976–77	First Division	40	0	1	0	2	0	0	0	43	0
Stoke City	1977–78	Second Division	3	0	0	0	1	0	0	0	4	0
Stoke City	Total		110	0	7	0	4	0	0	0	121	0
Nottingham Forest	1977–78	First Division	37	0	6	0	0	0	0	0	43	0
Nottingham Forest	1978–79	First Division	42	0	3	0	8	0	10	0	63	0
Nottingham Forest	1979–80	First Division	42	0	2	0	10	0	11	0	65	0
Nottingham Forest	1980–81	First Division	40	0	6	0	3	0	5	0	54	0
Nottingham Forest	1981–82	First Division	41	0	1	0	5	0	0	0	47	0
Nottingham Forest	Total		202	0	18	0	26	0	26	0	272	0
Southampton	1982–83	First Division	39	0	1	0	5	0	2	0	47	0
Southampton	1983–84	First Division	42	0	6	0	2	0	0	0	50	0
Southampton	1984–85	First Division	41	0	3	0	7	0	2	0	53	0
Southampton	1985–86	First Division	37	0	6	0	6	0	3	0	52	0
Southampton	1986–87	First Division	29	0	1	0	8	0	2	0	40	0
Southampton	Total		188	0	17	0	28	0	9	0	242	0
Derby County	1987–88	First Division	40	0	1	0	2	0	2	0	45	0
Derby County	1988–89	First Division	38	0	3	0	3	0	3	0	47	0
Derby County	1989–90	First Division	35	0	2	0	5	0	2	0	44	0
Derby County	1990–91	First Division	31	0	1	0	5	0	1	0	38	0
Derby County	1991–92	Second Division	31	0	3	0	3	0	0	0	37	0
Derby County	Total		175	0	10	0	18	0	8	0	211	0
Plymouth Argyle	1991–92	Second Division	7	0	0	0	0	0	0	0	7	0
Plymouth Argyle	1992–93	Second Division	23	0	1	0	6	0	2	0	32	0
Plymouth Argyle	1993–94	Second Division	4	0	0	0	0	0	0	0	4	0
Plymouth Argyle	Total		34	0	1	0	6	0	2	0	43	0
Wimbledon	1994–95	Premier League	0	0	0	0	0	0	0	0	0	0
Bolton Wanderers	1994–95	First Division	1	0	0	0	0	0	1	0	2	0
Coventry City	1995–96	Premier League	0	0	0	0	0	0	0	0	0	0
West Ham United	1995–96	Premier League	0	0	0	0	0	0	0	0	0	0
Leyton Orient	1996–97	Third Division	9	0	1	0	0	0	0	0	10	0
Career Total			1005	1	87	0	102	0	55	0	1249	1

=== International ===
Appearances and goals by national team and year
National team	Year	Apps	Goals
England	1970	1	0
England	1971	2	0
England	1972	2	0
England	1973	11	0
England	1974	4	0
England	1975	1	0
England	1976	0	0
England	1977	2	0
England	1978	3	0
England	1979	3	0
England	1980	4	0
England	1981	2	0
England	1982	10	0
England	1983	10	0
England	1984	11	0
England	1985	9	0
England	1986	13	0
England	1987	6	0
England	1988	8	0
England	1989	11	0
England	1990	12	0
Total		125	0

=== Managerial ===
As of 11 January 1995

Managerial record by team and tenure
Team	From	To	Record					Ref
Team	From	To	G	W	D	L	Win %	Ref
Plymouth Argyle	2 March 1992	11 January 1995	151	62	31	58	41.1	
Total			151	62	31	58	41.1	

== Honours ==
Leicester City

- Football League Second Division: 1970–71
- FA Charity Shield: 1971
- FA Cup runner-up: 1968–69

Nottingham Forest

- Football League First Division: 1977–78
- Football League Cup: 1978–79; runner-up: 1979–80
- FA Charity Shield: 1978
- European Cup: 1978–79, 1979–80
- European Super Cup: 1979

Bolton Wanderers

- Football League First Division play-offs: 1995

Individual

- PFA First Division Team of the Year: 1974–75, 1977–78, 1978–79, 1979–80, 1980–81, 1981–82, 1982–83, 1983–84, 1984–85, 1985–86
- PFA Team of the Century (1977–1996): 2007
- PFA Players' Player of the Year: 1977–78
- World XI: 1978, 1982, 1983, 1985, 1989, 1990
- Onze Mondial: 1979, 1980
- Nottingham Forest Player of the Season: 1981–82
- Southampton Player of the Season: 1984–85, 1985–86
- FWA Tribute Award: 1991
- English Football Hall of Fame: Inducted 2002
- Football League 100 Legends

== See also ==
- List of men's footballers with 100 or more international caps
- List of men's footballers with 1,000 or more official appearances
