= Mark Pembridge =

Welsh footballer and coach

Personal information
- Date of birth: 29 November 1970 (age 55)
- Place of birth: Merthyr Tydfil, Wales
- Height: 1.70 m (5 ft 7 in)
- Position: Midfielder

Senior career*
Years	Team	Apps	(Gls)
1989–1992	Luton Town	70	(6)
1992–1995	Derby County	140	(37)
1995–1998	Sheffield Wednesday	108	(13)
1998–1999	Benfica	19	(1)
1999–2003	Everton	101	(4)
2003–2007	Fulham	54	(2)
Total		492	(63)

International career
1991–2004	Wales	54	(6)
- * Club domestic league appearances and goals

Mark Anthony Pembridge (born 29 November 1970) is a Welsh former professional footballer who played as a midfielder, and a current coach at the academy for Fulham.

He played 333 matches in England's top division for Luton Town, Sheffield Wednesday, Everton and Fulham, scoring 25 goals, and he made 140 appearances for Derby County in the second tier, just missing out on promotion in the play-off final 1994. He spent the 1998–99 season at Benfica in Portugal.

Pembridge won 54 caps for Wales, and scored six goals, in a 13-year international career.

== Club career ==
=== Early career ===
Pembridge began his career at Luton Town in the First Division. He joined as a trainee in 1989.

=== Derby County ===
Having established as a left midfielder, 21-year old Pembridge signed for Derby County by manager Arthur Cox in the summer of 1992 for a fee of £1.25 million. He racked up 140 appearances and netted 37 goals over his time with Derby and played at Wembley twice – once in a 3–1 defeat to Cremonese in 1993 and then in a 2–1 defeat to Leicester City in the 1994 Football League First Division play-off final. Pembridge moved to Premier League Sheffield Wednesday for a fee of £900,000 in the summer of 1995.

=== Sheffield Wednesday ===
Pembridge played for Wednesday in the Premier League until 1998, when he left for Portuguese side Benfica on a free transfer after Wednesday finished 16th in the season.

=== Everton ===
Pembridge struggled to settle in Portugal and returned to England after one season, signing a contract with top-flight side Everton for £800,000. Pembridge had a good first two seasons at Everton, with his tenacious approach and thrusting runs from deep establishing the Welshman as an integral part of Everton's squad, thus securing him an excellent rapport with the Goodison Park faithful. However, testing times were around the corner for Pembridge, with a persistent calf injury meaning he only played 13 games in the 2001–02 season. The injury still bothered him during the 2002–03 season, but Pembridge still played a part in a dramatic season, which ended with Everton failing to qualify for a UEFA Cup place.

=== Fulham ===
Pembridge looked set to stay at Everton for the 2003–04 campaign, but on the transfer deadline day in August 2003, he was signed by Fulham for £750,000 after four years at Everton. He had an injury-free first season at Fulham, during which he scored his first goal for the club against rivals Chelsea, and this was followed by a successful second season in which he played 37 games overall, scoring once in the League Cup against Birmingham. Pembridge missed most of Fulham's 2005–06 season through injury, and only played 5 games. Manager Chris Coleman deemed him surplus to requirements, and he did not play a single game during the 2006–07 season. He was released by new manager Lawrie Sanchez at the end of the season. After this, Pembridge announced he was retiring. Reflecting on his retirement, Pembridge quoted:

Ultimately it wasn't too difficult. I tried exceptionally hard to get back to playing but there comes a time when you just need to stop. You know your own body and despite people saying that I could have carried on, I knew within myself it was time.

== International career ==
Pembridge was called up to play for Wales while at Luton in 1991. He had several highlights while playing for Wales, including scoring arguably his best career goal against Ukraine in 2001 and reaching the qualifying playoffs for Euro 2004, despite narrowly losing to Russia. Pembridge quit the national team in 2004 shortly after John Toshack was named as the new Wales manager. He announced his international retirement in 2005, ending speculation that he might return to play for Wales. He played 54 times for Wales, scoring 6 goals.

== Coaching career ==
On 4 September 2007, Fulham confirmed that Pembridge had stayed on at the club as a coach for the academy. He would later become Under-15s and U16s Coordinator for the club.

He left Fulham in October 2021.
