= Nigel Callaghan =

English footballer

Personal information
- Full name: Nigel Ian Callaghan
- Date of birth: 12 September 1962 (age 64)
- Place of birth: Singapore
- Height: 5 ft 9 in (1.75 m)
- Position: Right winger

Senior career*
Years	Team	Apps	(Gls)
1980–1987	Watford	221	(41)
1987–1989	Derby County	76	(10)
1989–1992	Aston Villa	26	(1)
1990	→ Derby County (loan)	12	(1)
1991	→ Watford (loan)	12	(1)
1991	→ Huddersfield Town (loan)	8	(0)
- Stafford Rangers
–1994	Hellenic		
Total		355	(54)

International career
1982–1984	England U21	9	(0)
1984	England B	1	(0)
- * Club domestic league appearances and goals

Nigel Ian Callaghan (born 12 September 1962) is an English former professional footballer.

== Playing career ==
Callaghan played on the right-wing for a number of clubs including Watford, Derby County and Aston Villa. Internationally, he represented England at Under-21 level and played one game for England B in November 1984 (alongside fellow Watford player Luther Blissett). Callaghan came on as a half time substitute to take part in a 2–0 win against a full New Zealand side.

Whilst at Watford, he played in the 1984 FA Cup Final where they lost to Everton. He had broken into their first team during the 1980–81 season and helped them win promotion to the First Division a year later. He also helped them finish second in the league in 1983. In total, he played 223 league games for the Hornets and scored 41 goals, before being transferred to Derby County in February 1987.

He scored four goals in 18 Second Division games for the Rams in the 1986–87 season as they cruised to the division championship and a return to the First Division after seven years away.

Callaghan was ever present for Derby as they secured their top-flight status in 1987–88, and he began the 1988–89 season well as Derby emerged as surprise title challengers (though they eventually had to settle for a fifth-place finish). He scored twice in 18 league games before moving to Aston Villa in February 1989 and making 16 league appearances for them (scoring once) as they secured their First Division survival a year after promotion. He played just eight games for Villa the following season, however, as they finished second and were beaten to the league title by Liverpool.

He played just twice in the 1990–91 season and was loaned back to Derby County. He also had loan spells with Huddersfield Town and Watford before new manager Ron Atkinson finally gave him a free transfer at the end of the 1991–92. Aged still only 29, his professional career was over, although he did continue playing for a while at non league level with Stafford Rangers.

== Retirement ==
Callaghan retired from football to work as a DJ. While working in a Greek island (Corfu) night-club during the early-1990s he was featured on a television documentary. He currently lives in Stafford.

== Illness ==
In November 2009 Callaghan was diagnosed with bowel cancer. An operation to remove the main tumour was undertaken in January 2010, however, some traces of cancer had moved elsewhere into his body and he subsequently faced a course of chemotherapy, which started in late March 2010. In September 2010 it was announced that a benefit match between former stars of two of Callaghan's old teams Derby County F.C. and Watford F.C. would take place at Pride Park Stadium during the close season.

== Career statistics ==
Club performance			League		Cup		Total	
Season	Club	League	Apps	Goals	Apps	Goals	Apps	Goals
England			League		FA Cup		Total	
1980–81	Watford	Second Division	21	2	0	0	21	2
1981–82	Watford	Second Division	37	5	0	0	37	5
1982–83	Watford	First Division	41	9	0	0	41	9
1983–84	Watford	First Division	41	10	0	0	41	10
1984–85	Watford	First Division	38	8	0	0	38	8
1985–86	Watford	First Division	23	4	0	0	23	4
1986–87	Watford	First Division	20	3	0	0	20	3
1986–87	Derby County	Second Division	18	4	0	0	18	4
1987–88	Derby County	First Division	40	4	0	0	40	4
1988–89	Derby County	First Division	18	2	0	0	18	2
1988–89	Aston Villa	First Division	16	1	0	0	16	1
1989–90	Aston Villa	First Division	8	0	0	0	8	0
1990–91	Aston Villa	First Division	2	0	0	0	2	0
1990–91	Derby County (loan)	First Division	12	1	0	0	12	1
1990–91	Watford (loan)	Second Division	12	1	0	0	12	1
1991–92	Aston Villa	First Division	0	0	0	0	0	0
1991–92	Huddersfield Town (loan)	Third Division	8	0	0	0	8	0
1992–93	Aston Villa	Premier League	0	0	0	0	0	0
Total	England		355	54	0	0	355	54
Career total			355	54	0	0	355	54

== Honours ==
Watford

- FA Cup runner-up: 1983–84
