= Martyn Chalk =

English footballer

Personal information
- Date of birth: 30 August 1969 (age 57)
- Place of birth: Swindon, England
- Position: Midfielder

Senior career*
Years	Team	Apps	(Gls)
1989–1990	Louth United		
1990–1994	Derby County	7	(1)
1994–1996	Stockport County	43	(6)
1996–2002	Wrexham	184	(13)
–	Rhyl		
- * Club domestic league appearances and goals

Martyn Chalk (born 30 August 1969) is an English former footballer who played in the Football League for Derby County, Stockport County and Wrexham.
