= Paul Kitson =

English footballer (born 1971)

Personal information
- Full name: Paul Kitson
- Date of birth: 9 January 1971 (age 55)
- Place of birth: Murton, England
- Height: 1.80 m (5 ft 11 in)
- Position: Striker

Youth career
- 1988–1989: Leicester City

Senior career*
| Years | Team | Apps | (Gls) |
| 1989–1992 | Leicester City | 50 | (6) |
| 1992–1994 | Derby County | 105 | (36) |
| 1994–1997 | Newcastle United | 36 | (10) |
| 1997–2002 | West Ham United | 63 | (18) |
| 1999–2000 | → Charlton Athletic (loan) | 6 | (1) |
| 2000 | → Crystal Palace (loan) | 4 | (0) |
| 2002–2003 | Brighton & Hove Albion | 10 | (2) |
| 2003–2004 | Rushden & Diamonds | 28 | (5) |
| 2005 | Aldershot Town | 1 | (0) |
| Total | | 303 | (78) |

International career
| 1991–1992 | England U21 | 7 | (3) |
- * Club domestic league appearances and goals

Paul Kitson (born 9 January 1971) is an English former professional footballer who played as a striker.

He notably played in the Premier League for Newcastle United and West Ham United, as well as in the Football League with Leicester City, Derby County, Charlton Athletic, Crystal Palace, Brighton & Hove Albion, Rushden & Diamonds, and Aldershot Town. He was capped seven times by England U21, scoring 3 goals.

== Career ==
=== Leicester City ===
Kitson began his career as a trainee at Leicester City in 1988. In one season at Leicester, Kitson and Ian Baraclough, his striking partner, scored 60 or so goals between them for the youth and reserve sides. Baraclough was sold to Grimsby Town, while Kitson scored 11 goals in 63 appearances for the Leicester first-team, and joined Derby County for a club record of £1.3 million transfer fee in March 1992, made up of £800,000 with Phil Gee and Ian Ormondroyd moving to Leicester in part exchange. Derby manager Arthur Cox described him as having "...all the qualities to develop into an outstanding player". and Kitson went on to score 49 goals in 132 appearances in two and a half years at Derby.

=== Derby County ===
His arrival at the Baseball Ground came in the final quarter of the 1991–92 season, the last season before the creation of the FA Premier League from the top flight of English football. Derby, bankrolled by wealthy new chairman Lionel Pickering, were spending heavily as they looked to win promotion from the Second Division to the new super league, and ironically one of their biggest promotion rivals were Kitson's former club and arguably Derby's biggest rivals – Leicester City. Kitson scored four times in 12 appearances as the 1991–92 season drew to a close, but defeat to Blackburn Rovers in the playoffs semifinals meant that third placed Derby would be denied a Wembley playoff final meeting with Kitson's former club and most crucially the chance of a place in the new Premier League.

Further heavy spending followed this disappointment, but Derby failed to make a serious challenge for promotion from the new Division One (which they had been widely expected to dominate) in 1992–93 but it was still a good personal season for Kitson, who scored 17 times in 44 league games. He added 13 goals to his league tally in 1993–94, and Derby reached the playoff final, where they were beaten 2–1 by Kitson's old club, Leicester City. He began the 1994–95 season still a Derby player, but after scoring two goals in eight games that season he was on his way out of the club after two and a half years and 36 goals from 105 league games.

=== Newcastle United ===
Newcastle United made an offer of £2,250,000 for Kitson in September 1994, which was initially turned down by Derby chairman and majority shareholder Lionel Pickering who felt that Kitson was worth between £3 and £4 million. However, Pickering was outvoted 4–1 by the club's directors and reluctantly agreed to the transfer, which went ahead on 24 September. The deal almost collapsed when Newcastle refused to adjust their pay structure and accommodate Kitson's personal demands and a bid was made by Everton, but the deal went through less than 24 hours after Pickering said that "God must be a Derby fan" and Freddie Fletcher, chief executive of Newcastle, had said the deal was "dead and buried", with Kitson signing a three-year contract at £3,500 a week. He scored his first goal for Newcastle in the 2–0 win over Manchester United in the third round of the League Cup in October 1994, though he was still very much the club's "backup" striker behind Andy Cole and Peter Beardsley. However, when Cole was sold to Manchester United in January 1995, found himself at centre-forward for the second half of the 1994–95 season. He had a decent campaign, scoring eight goals in 26 games, though 1994–95 is generally remembered as a disappointing season for Newcastle, who began it as many people's title favourites with six successive wins but ended up finishing sixth – not even enough for a UEFA Cup place.

However, the arrival of Les Ferdinand during the 1995 close season meant that Kitson was once again a squad player as the 1995–96 season got underway, and the arrival of Faustino Asprilla in mid season further reduced his first team chances. Newcastle finished second that season after being overhauled in the second half campaign by a Manchester United side who sealed the title by a five-point margin barely four months after Newcastle had led by 10 points, but Kitson's part in Newcastle's exciting though ultimately disappointing campaign had been minimal as he had played just seven league games and scored twice. But he remained loyal to the Magpies even after another blow at the end of July 1996: the arrival of £15 million world record signing Alan Shearer. He managed three Premier League appearances as Newcastle were once again under the title challengers, before finally leaving on 10 February 1997 in a £2.3 million switch to Premier League strugglers West Ham United. His departure from Tyneside was relatively quiet, coming just weeks after one of the most momentous events in the club's history: the resignation of manager Kevin Keegan.

=== West Ham United ===
West Ham were fighting against relegation from the Premier League when Kitson joined them. West Ham's assistant manager Frank Lampard said, "The last man we signed from Newcastle was Bryan 'Pop' Robson in the 1970s and Paul has the same qualities. He is quick, sharp and has good physical attributes." He made his home debut, against Tottenham Hotspur on 22 February 1997, which West Ham won 4–3. Kitson scored West Ham's second goal, with other new signing John Hartson getting the third goal to also score on his debut. This marked the beginning of what is still arguably West Ham's finest strikeforce since the Tony Cottee/Frank McAvennie partnership of the 1980s, and a contrast following the disappointing spells of strikers like Florin Raducioiu and Paulo Futre.

Kitson bagged two against Chelsea in a 3–2 win, two against Everton in a 2–2 draw, and bagged a hat-trick against Sheffield Wednesday in a 5–1 win. West Ham survived relegation despite a tough season and finished 14th, with Kitson's eight goals in 14 league games being priceless to their survival.

Subsequent seasons at Upton Park were not quite so successful, with the 1997–98 seeing Kitson restricted to 13 games and 4 goals in the Premier League (though the Hammers improved to eighth in the league and just missed out on a UEFA Cup place in their best season for over a decade), and a year later he contributed 17 games and 3 goals to a side which finished fifth to secure UEFA Cup football and their first European campaign in almost 20 years.

However, Kitson's first team opportunities were becoming even more limited, as he made 10 goalless league appearances in 1999–2000 and just two in 2000–01. After a long period without scoring he surprisingly scored a hat-trick in the 4–4 draw with Charlton Athletic on 19 November 2001 for West Ham, a match that he considers to be the highlight of a career in which he failed to live up to his vast potential. The first of these goals was a blistering right foot volley after a through ball from Paolo Di Canio – it was voted number three by the West Ham supporters' association poll of their top 10 goals of the decade. These were the only goals he scored in the 2001–02 season – his last at the club.

=== Charlton Athletic and Crystal Palace ===
During his final three seasons at West Ham, Kitson was loaned out to Charlton Athletic and Crystal Palace, but neither of these spells was particularly productive. He scored once for Charlton, with his goal coincidentally coming against the club he would soon join on loan: Crystal Palace.

== Personal life ==
On 21 April 2018, Kitson was accused of gambling £25,000 that he was meant to be putting towards paying off his debts, after he was declared bankrupt the previous year. In 2021, Kitson was banned from driving for 22 months and fined £550 after being found guilty of drink driving. Kitson had crashed into his neighbour's fence in Billingham after a 10-hour drinking session.

== Honours ==
West Ham

- UEFA Intertoto Cup: 1999
