= Shane Nicholson (footballer) =

English footballer

Personal information
- Full name: Shane Michael Nicholson
- Date of birth: 3 June 1970 (age 56)
- Place of birth: Newark-on-Trent, England
- Height: 5 ft 11 in (1.80 m)
- Position: Left back

Senior career*
Years	Team	Apps	(Gls)
1986–1992	Lincoln City	133	(6)
1992–1996	Derby County	74	(1)
1996–1998	West Bromwich Albion	52	(0)
1998–1999	Chesterfield	24	(1)
1999–2001	Stockport County	77	(3)
2001–2002	Sheffield United	25	(3)
2002–2004	Tranmere Rovers	54	(6)
2004–2007	Chesterfield	68	(12)
2006–2007	→ Lincoln City (loan)	8	(0)
2007	→ Boston United (loan)	6	(0)
Total		523	(31)
- * Club domestic league appearances and goals

Shane Michael Nicholson (born 3 June 1970) is an English retired professional footballer who played as a left back. In his 21-year career Nicholson played for 8 clubs, played in 523 league matches, scoring 31 goals. In all competitions, Nicholson played in 594 matches, scoring 34 goals.

== Footballing career ==
=== Playing career ===
==== Lincoln City ====
Nicholson started his career with Lincoln City in 1986. Nicholson made his début for the club on 22 November 1986 in a match against Burnley, becoming the youngest ever Lincoln City player to play in the Football League, at the age of 16 years and 172 days. Nicholson went on to play in seven league games during the 1986–87 season, a campaign which ended in the club being relegated from The Football League, the first team to go down to Non-League football in the post election system. They did, however return to the League in the 1987–88 season, after winning the Football Conference. After the club's promotion to the Division Four, Nicholson became a first team regular, playing 126 league games in four seasons, scoring six goals.

==== Derby County ====
Nicholson joined Division Two (2nd tier) outfit Derby County on 22 April 1992 for a fee of £100,000. When he joined The Rams, they were hoping to get promoted to the newly founded FA Premier League, but missed out in the playoffs despite finishing in 3rd place; Nicholson did not play any matches in the run in. While at the Baseball Ground, Nicholson was not a regular in the starting line-up, playing in 74 matches and scoring one goal in 3 1/2 seasons and left the club in February 1996.

==== West Bromwich Albion ====
On 9 February 1996 Nicholson joined Division One (2nd tier) rivals West Bromwich Albion, for a fee of £150,000. In his first half season at The Baggies, the 1995–96 season, he played 18 league matches, most of the clubs remaining league games. In his first full season however, the 1996–97 season, as at Derby, he was not a regular, playing in just 18 matches, and in the following 1997–98 season, 16 matches before being suspended after failing a drugs test, testing positive for traces of amphetamines. He was sacked by the club, and his appeal was denied.

==== Chesterfield ====
In August 1998, Nicholson's ban was lifted, and he joined Division Two (3rd tier) club Chesterfield, with whom he had been training. He only spent one season on his first time spent with The Spireites, the 1998–99 season, where he played in 24 league matches, scoring one goal.

==== Stockport County ====
On 4 June 1999, Nicholson joined Division One (2nd tier) club Stockport County on a free transfer. In his first season for the club, the 1999–2000 season Nicholson scored 1 goal in 42 league appearances and in the following 2000–01 season, scored two goals in 35 league games.

==== Sheffield United ====
On 6 June 2001, Nicholson joined fellow Division One (2nd tier) club Sheffield United on a free transfer, signing on three-year contract. In his one season at Bramall Lane, the 2001–02 season, Nicholson played in 25 league games scoring three goals.

==== Tranmere Rovers ====
On 15 July 2002, Nicholson joined Division Two (3rd tier) club Tranmere Rovers on a free transfer, signing on two-year contract. In his two years for the club, Nicholson played in 54 league matches, scoring six goals, before being released in May 2004.

==== Return to Chesterfield ====
After his release by Tranmere Rovers, Nicholson rejoined Chesterfield on 29 June 2004, on a one-year contract. After giving some impressive performances during the 2004–05 season, scoring seven goals in 43 league appearances, Nicholson's contract was extended, but the captain's next season was cut short due to injury and needed emergency treatment to an infection in his leg following keyhole surgery. Prior to this injury, Nicholson had scored five goals in 25 league matches during the 2005–06 season. Nicholson was offered a one-year extension to his contract, but after accepting the offer injured his knee in a friendly versus Sheffield Wednesday and was expected to be out for two–three weeks. Nicholson never recovered from this form and only played in three games, all as substitute, totalling up to 48 minutes, two in the league and one in the Football League Cup. In November 2006, Nicholson joined Lincoln City on 23 November 2006, 20 years and 1 day after his league début for the club. He played in eight games for The Imps, scoring no goals, before returning to Chesterfield in January 2007. On 19 January 2007, Nicholson joined Boston United on loan for a month. The loan move was extended until the end of the 2006–07 season. The move was cut short due to injury in March 2007. During his loan at York Street, Nicholson played in six league games, scoring no goals. He was released as a player in May 2007 and announced his retirement from professional football.

=== Coaching career ===
After he announcing his retirement from football in 2007, Chesterfield manager Lee Richardson announced that Nicholson would become the clubs rehabilitation and fitness coach.
