= Steve Hayward =

English footballer

Personal information
- Full name: Steve Lee Hayward
- Date of birth: 8 September 1971 (age 55)
- Place of birth: Pelsall, England
- Position: Midfielder

Senior career*
Years	Team	Apps	(Gls)
1988–1995	Derby County	20	(3)
1995–1997	Carlisle United	104	(15)
1997–2001	Fulham	138	(12)
2001–2004	Barnsley	46	(3)
Total		308	(33)
- * Club domestic league appearances and goals as of 16:10, 22 April 2010 (UTC)

Steve Hayward (born 8 September 1971) is an English former professional footballer who played as a central midfielder in a sixteen-year career spanning from 1988 to 2004.

== Career ==
Born in Pelsall near Walsall, Hayward began his career with Derby County and made his League debut in 1990, but found first-team opportunities limited. He joined Carlisle United in 1994 and won two promotions from Division Three and the 1997 Football League Trophy Final during his time at the club before moving to Fulham in 1997. He played a role in Fulham's promotion and run to the 5th round of the FA Cup in 1999. Hayward was signed by Barnsley in January 2001. That season he had made one league appearance for Fulham up to that point, which ironically was against Barnsley. Fulham would go on to get promoted to the Premier League that season in his absence. Hayward scored on his Barnsley debut; a 2–1 defeat at Burnley. Injuries hampered his stay at Barnsley and he retired in 2004.

== Honours ==
Carlisle United

- Football League Third Division: 1995–96; third-place promotion: 1996–97
- Football League Trophy: 1996–97; runner-up: 1994–95

Fulham

- Football League Second Division: 1998–99
