= Tommy Johnson (footballer, born 1971) =

English footballer (born 1971)

Personal information
- Full name: Thomas Johnson
- Date of birth: 15 January 1971 (age 55)
- Place of birth: Gateshead, England
- Height: 1.78 m (5 ft 10 in)
- Position: Striker

Youth career
- 1989–1990: Notts County

Senior career*
Years	Team	Apps	(Gls)
1989–1992	Notts County	118	(47)
1992–1995	Derby County	98	(30)
1995–1997	Aston Villa	47	(13)
1997–2001	Celtic	35	(18)
1999	→ Everton (loan)	3	(0)
2001	Sheffield Wednesday	8	(3)
2001–2002	Kilmarnock	10	(7)
2002–2005	Gillingham	49	(7)
2005–2006	Sheffield United	1	(0)
2005	Scunthorpe United	14	(1)
2006	Tamworth	7	(1)
2006–2007	Rocester		
Total		350	(127)

International career
1990–1992	England U21	7	(2)
- * Club domestic league appearances and goals

Thomas Johnson (born 15 January 1971) is an English football coach and former professional footballer.

As a player, he was a striker notably in the Premier League for Aston Villa and Everton and in the Scottish Premier League for Celtic and Kilmarnock. He also played in the Football League for Notts County, Derby County, Sheffield Wednesday, Gillingham, Sheffield United and Scunthorpe United, before finishing his career in non-League football with Tamworth and Rocester. He was capped seven times by England U21 scoring twice.

Since retirement, he was worked on the coaching staff at Notts County, Northern Ireland U23s as well as working for Cardiff City as a club scout. He is currently coaching assistant for the Northern Ireland national team.

== Early life ==
Johnson was born in Gateshead, England.

== Playing career ==
=== Notts County ===
Johnson started his career with Notts County in the summer of 1987, joining them as an apprentice on leaving school. He was a first-team regular and a professional by the end of the decade, when still only 18 years old, and his prolific goalscoring saw County reach the First Division in 1991 after two successive promotion playoff triumphs. However, County lasted just one season in the top flight and missed out on a place in the new Premier League that came into force for the 1992–93 season. Johnson had played 118 league games for the Magpies, scoring 47 goals – his best season being the 1989–90 campaign which saw them win promotion from the Third Division via the playoffs.

=== Derby County ===
During the second half of the 1991–92 season, Johnson left Meadow Lane and moved down a division to ambitious Derby County, who then narrowly missed out on a Premier League place in the playoffs, in a £1.3 million deal. He helped them reach the new Division One playoff final in 1993–94, but Derby lost 2–1 to local rivals Leicester City with Johnson scoring their only goal, and in early 1995, Johnson finally made his Premier League debut with a move to Aston Villa. His spell at the Baseball Ground had brought 30 goals from 98 league games.

=== Aston Villa ===
In January 1995 Johnson joined Aston Villa as one of Brian Little's first signings in a £1.9 million deal. On his arrival at Villa Park, Johnson displaced Dalian Atkinson as strike-partner to Dean Saunders, and his future at the highest level looked promising as he scored four goals in 14 league games to help Villa stay in the Premier League. It was a trying season for the midlanders, and Johnson was part of Little's extensive rebuilding scheme which saw many of the fading stars who had been bought by his predecessor Ron Atkinson replaced by younger players. Villa finished one place above the relegation zone, having finished one place short of the league title two seasons earlier.

The close season saw Atkinson and Saunders leave the club, and manager Little brought in Serbian striker Savo Milosevic. However, the greatest threat to Johnson's first-team chances was Dwight Yorke, who had been at the club since 1989 but until then had often been fielded as a winger rather than an out-and-out striker. As Yorke established himself as a centre-forward, Johnson's first-team chances became limited, although he did collect a League Cup winner's medal on 24 March 1996 as Villa triumphed 3–0 over Leeds United at Wembley. He managed five goals in 23 appearances for a Villa side who finished fourth in the Premier League and also reached the FA Cup semi finals, being in with a faint hope of a unique domestic treble until the final quarter of the season.

=== Celtic ===
In 1996–97, Johnson was still unable to displace Yorke or Milosevic, managing just 20 league games and four goals, before he joined Scottish giants Celtic for £2.4million on 27 March 1997 – transfer deadline day.

Despite seeing his career at the Hoops plagued by injury, he enjoyed some success at Celtic Park, including scoring the goal that won the 2000–01 Scottish Premier League title (as the Bhoys won the Scottish domestic treble), and scoring in the 2000 Scottish League Cup final win over Aberdeen. He had also collected a title medal in 1997–98. At Celtic, he played under managers Tommy Burns, Wim Jansen, Jozef Venglos, John Barnes, Kenny Dalglish and finally Martin O'Neill, but managed just 35 league games and scored 18 goals.

During his time at Celtic, Johnson was briefly loaned out to Everton in the autumn of 1999, where he played three times in the Premier League but failed to score.

=== Later career ===
On leaving Celtic, Johnson had a brief spell with Sheffield Wednesday before returning to Scotland to join Kilmarnock for a similarly brief spell, and then signed for Gillingham in December 2001. After two seasons at Gillingham, Johnson joined Sheffield United. He only made one appearance at the club before moving on to Scunthorpe United, where injuries once again dented his chances of success. He scored three goals during his spell at Scunthorpe, with strikes against Bury in the FA Cup, Halifax Town in the Football League Trophy and Chesterfield in the league.

During his time at Scunthorpe United he was loaned out to Tamworth, finally joining them on a permanent contract and staying there until the summer of 2006.

On 10 September 2006 he signed for Midland Football Alliance club Rocester.

== Coaching career ==
Johnson re-joined Notts County as part of the coaching staff under the management of Ian McParland on 1 November 2007. Just two games into Paul Ince's management in November 2010, Johnson parted company with the club.

In October 2019 he became Blackpool's head of recruitment having also coached Northern Ireland's Under 23s and scouted for Cardiff City. He left Blackpool in July 2021.

== Honours ==
Notts County

- Football League Second Division play-offs: 1991
- Football League Third Division play-offs: 1990

Aston Villa

- Football League Cup: 1995–96

Celtic

- Scottish Football League Premier Division / Scottish Premier League: 1997–98, 2000–01
- Scottish Cup: 2000–01
- Scottish League Cup: 1999–2000, 2000–01
