= Jason Kavanagh =

English footballer

Personal information
- Full name: Jason Kavanagh
- Date of birth: 23 November 1971 (age 54)
- Place of birth: Birmingham, England
- Position: Defender

Senior career*
Years	Team	Apps	(Gls)
1988–1996	Derby County	96	(1)
1996	→ Wycombe Wanderers (loan)	4	(0)
1996–1999	Wycombe Wanderers	89	(1)
1999	Stoke City	8	(0)
1999–2000	Cambridge United	19	(0)
2000–2003	Burton Albion	89	(7)
Total		305	(9)

International career
1991	England U20	3	(0)
- * Club domestic league appearances and goals

Jason Kavanagh (born 23 November 1971) is an English former football defender.

== Career ==
He began his playing career in 1988, signing for Derby County on leaving school in the summer of 1988 and turning professional soon afterwards and playing for them during their relegation from the Football League First Division in 1991 and still being there when they returned to the top flight (now the FA Premier League) with promotion in 1996. However, he lost his place at right-back to Jacob Laursen around this time, and in the autumn of 1996 he was sold to Wycombe Wanderers for £25,000 after a loan spell. He had played 96 league games for the Rams, scoring once.

At Adams Park, he helped keep Wycombe in Division Two and remained with them for three seasons, playing 89 league games and scoring once.

A brief spell at Stoke City followed in 1999 where he made just nine appearances, before he signed for newly promoted Division Two side Cambridge United and made 19 appearances as they achieved survival at this level in the 1999-2000 season. However, this was the end of his career as a professional player when still only aged 28, as he transferred to Northern Premier League side Burton Albion that summer. He would remain at the Brewers for three seasons, helping them win the Northern Premier title in 2002, before finally retiring in 2003 after 89 games and seven goals for them.

== Career statistics ==
Appearances and goals by club, season and competition
Club	Season	League			FA Cup		League Cup		Other^{[A]}		Total	
Club	Season	Division	Apps	Goals	Apps	Goals	Apps	Goals	Apps	Goals	Apps	Goals
Derby County	1990–91	First Division	11	0	1	0	0	0	2	0	14	0
Derby County	1991–92	Second Division	25	0	2	0	2	0	0	0	29	0
Derby County	1992–93	First Division	10	0	2	0	0	0	7	0	19	0
Derby County	1993–94	First Division	19	0	0	0	2	0	1	0	22	0
Derby County	1994–95	First Division	25	1	1	0	2	0	4	0	32	1
Derby County	1995–96	First Division	9	0	1	0	1	0	0	0	11	0
Derby County	Total		99	1	7	0	7	0	14	0	127	1
Wycombe Wanderers	1996–97	Second Division	27	0	1	0	0	0	0	0	28	1
Wycombe Wanderers	1997–98	Second Division	45	1	1	0	2	0	2	0	50	1
Wycombe Wanderers	1998–99	Second Division	18	0	0	0	4	0	1	0	23	0
Wycombe Wanderers	Total		90	1	2	0	6	0	3	0	101	1
Stoke City	1998–99	Second Division	8	0	0	0	0	0	0	0	8	0
Stoke City	1999–2000	Second Division	0	0	0	0	1	0	0	0	1	0
Stoke City	Total		8	0	0	0	1	0	0	0	9	0
Cambridge United	1999–2000	Second Division	19	0	3	0	0	0	0	0	22	0
Career total			216	2	12	0	14	0	17	0	259	2

A. The "Other" column constitutes appearances and goals in the Full Members Cup, Football League play-offs, and Football League Trophy.
