= Arthur Cox (footballer) =

English footballer and manager

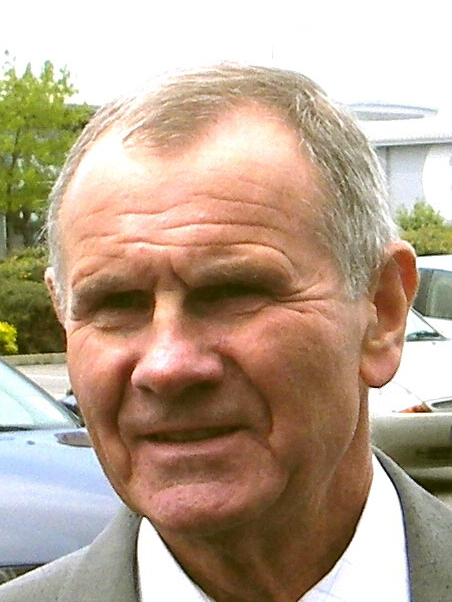
- Cox in May 2006

Personal information
- Date of birth: 14 December 1939 (age 86)
- Place of birth: Southam, England

Managerial career
- Years: Team
- 1968: Aston Villa (caretaker)
- 1976–1980: Chesterfield
- 1980–1984: Newcastle United
- 1984–1993: Derby County

Arthur Cox (born 14 December 1939 in Southam, Warwickshire) is an English former football manager.

He was unable to become a professional football player as he broke his leg playing in a reserve game for Coventry City, and, at 17-years-old, became a trainer for the Sky Blues. He would spend time coaching at Sunderland and in Turkey, before he was given his first permanent management position.

== Career ==
Cox joined Walsall's coaching staff, acting as trainer-coach for five years until July 1968, when he was appointed as Aston Villa's first-team trainer-coach under manager, Tommy Cummings. During the 1968-69 Aston Villa season, following the sacking of Cummings, Cox was made caretaker manager before the appointment of Tommy Docherty. Villa Chairman Doug Ellis was nicknamed "Deadly Doug" by football pundit Jimmy Greaves, after sacking numerous managers during his tenures as chairman. Cox was the first of 13 different managers during his two spells but Ellis was at pains to point out that Cox's position was only ever temporary. Cox continued on the side-line, assisting Docherty. When Docherty was sacked, Cox moved on to Halifax Town as trainer-coach.

Cox started his management career proper at Chesterfield in 1976 where he stayed for four years before joining Newcastle United. Here he won promotion to the First Division and introduced future international players such as Peter Beardsley and Chris Waddle. He also gave Newcastle a cult hero in Kevin Keegan, the former England striker, who joined the club in 1982 and was instrumental in their promotion two years later before retiring.

Cox left Newcastle just after their promotion in 1984 and took over at Derby County, who had just been relegated to the Third Division. He took them to promotion two years later and the following year, 1987, they won the Second Division title to end a seven-year exile from the First Division. In October 1988, he paid a club record £1million for striker Dean Saunders who quickly established himself as one of the best strikers in the English league and along with the likes of defender Mark Wright saw the Rams emerge as surprise title contenders in the 1988–89 season, though in the end they finished fifth. His other notable acquisitions included goalkeeper Peter Shilton, midfielder Trevor Hebberd and winger Ted McMinn.

However, chairman Robert Maxwell was unwilling to grant Cox further funds to buy top players and this sabotaged their chances of further challenges for honours. In 1991, just after Maxwell sold the club to new owner Brian Fearn, Derby County were relegated and had to sell several key players including Saunders and Wright (who both joined Liverpool).

However, Pickering's funds enabled Cox to bring in expensive new signings including Marco Gabbiadini, Paul Simpson, Craig Short and Tommy Johnson who were all among the most expensive signings ever made by clubs outside the top flight. Short, for instance, joined Derby in September 1992 from under the noses of Blackburn Rovers, who were competing in the top flight and had just set a national transfer record fee by signing Alan Shearer.

Derby County just missed out on automatic promotion from the Second Division in 1991–92 and their hopes of a place in the new FA Premier League were ended when they lost to eventual promotion winners Blackburn Rovers in the playoff semi finals. However, new owner Pickering had given Cox the money to buy key players such as Johnson, Gabbiadini and Short, which saw Derby begin the 1992–93 season as most people's firm favourites for the new Division One title. However, they could only manage an eighth-place finish – not even enough for the playoffs – and Cox resigned the following October due to "ill health", handing over the reins to his assistant Roy McFarland.

He was never employed as a manager again, although he was linked with managerial vacancies more than once after leaving Derby – including the Middlesbrough job in May 1994 - and he would remain in football in coaching capacities until 2004.

He has also worked as assistant manager at various clubs such as Sunderland and Galatasaray, and often as 'right-hand man' to fellow manager Kevin Keegan. The two worked together at Fulham and then with the England national team. Keegan wanted to appoint Cox as England's assistant manager, but the FA would not allow it because he was over 60, so Cox was given a coaching position instead. Cox resigned, along with fellow coach Peter Beardsley, following the departure of Keegan in October 2000.

They linked up again at Manchester City, where Cox was promoted from chief scout to assistant manager in April 2002. He announced his retirement from football in 2004 but later returned as first-team coach with Keegan at Newcastle between January and August 2008, before he retired again.

== Managerial statistics ==
All competitive league games (league and domestic cup) and international matches (including friendlies) are included.

As of 11 April 2015

Team	Nat	Year	Record				
Team	Nat	Year	G	W	D	L	Win %
Chesterfield	England	1976–1980	206	77	53	76	37.38
Newcastle United	England	1980–1984	182	78	46	58	42.86
Derby County	England	1984–1993	454	184	109	161	40.53
Career Total			842	339	208	295	40.26
