= Michael Forsyth (footballer) =

English footballer

Personal information
- Full name: Michael Eric Forsyth
- Date of birth: 20 March 1966 (age 60)
- Place of birth: Liverpool, England
- Height: 5 ft 11 in (1.80 m)
- Position: Defender

Senior career*
Years	Team	Apps	(Gls)
1983–1986	West Bromwich Albion	29	(1)
1986–1995	Derby County	325	(8)
1995–1996	Notts County	7	(0)
1996–1996	→ Hereford United (loan)	11	(0)
1996–1999	Wycombe Wanderers	58	(2)
1999–2002	Burton Albion	0	(0)

International career
1983–1984	England Youth	8	(2)
- * Club domestic league appearances and goals

Michael Eric Forsyth (born 20 March 1966) is an English former footballer.

== Playing career ==
Forsyth started his playing career at West Brom after joining as an apprentice at 17, making his debut against Arsenal at Highbury, marking Tony Woodcock and Charlie Nicholas. West Bromwich Albion F.C. won 1 nil. He then moved to Derby County in 1986 for £25,000 where he spent most of his career. Including a spell that saw him win the Jack Stamps Trophy in the 1987–88 season. Subsequent moves to Notts County for £200,000, (including a loan spell at Hereford), Wycombe Wanderers and Burton Albion saw him play out his career. He joined the Derby County Academy training staff under the management of Nigel Cloughin April 2009. Since then he has worked as a scout for Nigel Clough at Sheffield United and is currently at Mansfield Town.

== Honours ==
Individual

- Derby County Player of the Year winner: 1988
