= Martin Taylor (footballer, born 1966) =

English footballer and coach

Personal information
- Date of birth: 9 December 1966 (age 59)
- Place of birth: Tamworth, England
- Height: 5 ft 11 in (1.80 m)
- Position: Goalkeeper

Team information
- Current team: Burton Albion (goalkeeping coach)

Youth career
- 1985–1986: Mile Oak Rovers

Senior career*
Years	Team	Apps	(Gls)
1986–1997	Derby County	97	(0)
1987	→ Carlisle (loan)	10	(0)
1987	→ Scunthorpe United (loan)	8	(0)
1996	→ Crewe Alexandra (loan)	6	(0)
1997	→ Wycombe Wanderers (loan)	4	(0)
1997–2003	Wycombe Wanderers	234	(0)
2003	→ Barnsley (loan)	3	(0)
2003–2004	Telford United	3	(0)
2004–2008	Burton Albion	5	(0)
Total		370	(0)
- * Club domestic league appearances and goals

Martin Taylor (born 9 December 1966) is an English former footballer. He was a goalkeeper. During his time at Wycombe, Taylor went on to miss just seven League games in four seasons, culminating in a clean sweep of the Player of the Season awards in May 2001. This followed a season where the ex-Derby 'keeper was not only ever-present with a staggering 63 appearances but also achieved hero status during the record breaking FA Cup run. The Fifth Round replay against Wimbledon at Selhurst Park is an evening that will never be forgotten for Taylor and the Wycombe fans who were there. Taylor saved a penalty from Neal Ardley in the last minute of normal time and then scored from the spot himself in the penalty shoot-out.
