= 2002–03 Oldham Athletic A.F.C. season =

Oldham Athletic
2002–03 season
- Chairman: David Brierley
- Manager: Iain Dowie
- Stadium: Boundary Park
- Second Division: 5th
- FA Cup: Second round
- League Cup: Fourth round
- Auto Windscreens Shield: First round
- Top goalscorer: League: David Eyres (13); All: David Eyres (16)
Home colours	Away colours	Third colours

The 2002–03 season was Oldham Athletic's sixth consecutive season in the third tier of English football. The club competed in Football League Second Division under the management of Iain Dowie who had been promoted from the role of assistant manager following the dismissal of Mick Wadsworth at the end of the previous season.

In addition to the league, Oldham participated in the FA Cup, the League Cup (then known as the Worthington Cup) and the Football League Trophy (then known as the LDV Vans Trophy). The club reached the second round of the FA Cup, the fourth round of the League Cup and the first round of the Football League Trophy.

Oldham finished 5th in the Second Division with 82 points from 46 matches. This league placing qualified Oldham for the end-of-season promotion play-offs. In the play-off semi-final, Oldham played Queens Park Rangers. The first leg at Boundary Park finished 1-1, with David Eyres scoring for Oldham and Richard Langley equalising for QPR. QPR won the second leg 1-0 at Loftus Road through a Paul Furlong goal, giving them a 2-1 aggregate win and ending Oldham's promotion challenge.

Following the end of the season, the club's major shareholder, Chris Moore, announced that he was not willing to support the club financially to the same level he had during the previous season, when losses were reported to be £50,000 a week. Moore sold his 95% shareholding to a group headed by then commercial manager Sean Jarvis and financial director Neil Joy, who operated as the club's directors until administrators were appointed soon after the start of the 2003-04 season.

== Players ==
The following players appeared for Oldham during the season. Details are provided as at the end of the season (30 June 2003).

No	Pos	Nat	Name	Age	Debut	App	Start	Sub	Goal	Yellow card	Red card	Notes
2	DF	(England)	Dean Holden	23	13 Oct 2001	34	26	8	4	9	0	
3	MF	(England)	Darren Sheridan	35	11 Aug 2001	78	70	8	2	16	5	
6	MF	(England)	Lee Duxbury	33	8 Mar 1997	284	255	29	39	34	0	
7	MF	(England)	Paul Murray	26	15 Dec 2001	60	58	2	6	10	0	
8	MF	(Republic of Ireland)	John Sheridan	38	24 Oct 1998	140	128	12	12	14	1	
9	FW	(Republic of Ireland)	Ben Burgess	21	14 Jan 2003	7	6	1	0	1	0	On loan
10	FW	(England)	John Eyre	28	30 Oct 1993	78	55	23	9	10	0	
11	MF	(England)	Matty Appleby	31	16 Jan 2002	29	27	2	2	6	2	
12	FW	(England)	Wayne Andrews	25	31 Aug 2002	46	34	12	12	9	1	
13	GK	(Northern Ireland)	David Miskelly	23	15 Dec 1998	26	22	4	0	0	0	
14	DF	(England)	Michael Clegg	25	23 Feb 2002	16	13	3	0	1	0	
15	DF	(France)	Julien Baudet	24	27 Nov 2001	52	40	12	3	8	3	
16	GK	(Australia)	Les Pogliacomi	27	10 Aug 2002	43	43	0	0	0	1	
17	FW	(England)	Scott Vernon	19	22 Oct 2002	10	3	7	3	0	0	
18	MF	(England)	Danny Boshell	22	12 Feb 2000	38	25	13	2	7	0	
19	FW	(Canada)	Carlo Corazzin	31	12 Aug 2000	129	94	35	23	7	0	
20	DF	(England)	David Beharall	24	21 Nov 2001	61	59	2	1	1	0	
21	DF	(England)	Fitz Hall	22	1 Apr 2002	53	52	1	6	10	2	
22	DF	(England)	Danny Hall	19	22 Mar 2003	2	0	2	0	0	0	
23	DF	(Scotland)	Will Haining	20	26 Dec 2001	35	29	6	3	2	0	
24	FW	(New Zealand)	Chris Killen	21	10 Aug 2002	34	15	19	4	3	0	
28	MF	(England)	David Eyres	39	14 Oct 2000	135	130	5	32	16	1	
29	DF	(England)	Clint Hill	24	13 Aug 2002	26	26	0	1	2	1	
30	FW	(Angola)	Lourenço	20	10 Aug 2002	10	3	7	1	0	0	
31	MF	(England)	Tony Carss	27	14 Oct 2000	84	65	19	6	7	0	
32	FW	(Netherlands)	Clyde Wijnhard	29	24 Aug 2002	31	30	1	13	2	0	
33	DF	(England)	Chris Armstrong	20	23 Oct 2001	79	78	1	1	10	0	
34	MF	(England)	Josh Low	24	17 Aug 2002	27	25	2	4	4	0	

== Statistics ==
=== Appearances and goals ===
No.	Pos	Nat	Player	Total		Division 2		F.A. Cup		League Cup		League Trophy		D2 Play-Offs	
No.	Pos	Nat	Player	Apps	Goals	Apps	Goals	Apps	Goals	Apps	Goals	Apps	Goals	Apps	Goals
2	DF	(England) ENG	Dean Holden	7	2	2+4	2	0+0	0	0+1	0	0+0	0	0+0	0
3	MF	(England) ENG	Darren Sheridan	41	1	29+4	1	3+0	0	1+1	0	1+0	0	2+0	0
6	MF	(England) ENG	Lee Duxbury	38	4	16+18	4	0+2	0	1+0	0	0+0	0	0+1	0
7	MF	(England) ENG	Paul Murray	34	1	29+1	1	1+0	0	1+0	0	0+0	0	2+0	0
8	MF	(Republic of Ireland) IRL	John Sheridan	6	0	3+2	0	0+0	0	1+0	0	0+0	0	0+0	0
9	FW	(Republic of Ireland) IRL	Ben Burgess	7	0	6+1	0	0+0	0	0+0	0	0+0	0	0+0	0
10	FW	(England) ENG	John Eyre	39	2	27+4	2	3+0	0	2+0	0	0+1	0	2+0	0
11	MF	(England) ENG	Matty Appleby	12	0	11+1	0	0+0	0	0+0	0	0+0	0	0+0	0
12	FW	(England) ENG	Wayne Andrews	46	12	28+9	11	2+1	0	1+2	0	1+0	1	2+0	0
13	GK	(Northern Ireland) NIR	David Miskelly	15	0	9+2	0	0+0	0	2+0	0	1+0	0	1+0	0
14	DF	(England) ENG	Michael Clegg	10	0	7+1	0	0+0	0	1+0	0	0+1	0	0+0	0
15	DF	(France) FRA	Julien Baudet	28	2	21+3	2	1+0	0	2+0	0	1+0	0	0+0	0
16	GK	(Australia) AUS	Les Pogliacomi	43	0	37+0	0	3+0	0	2+0	0	0+0	0	1+0	0
17	FW	(England) ENG	Scott Vernon	10	3	2+6	1	0+1	0	0+0	0	1+0	2	0+0	0
18	MF	(England) ENG	Danny Boshell	2	0	2+0	0	0+0	0	0+0	0	0+0	0	0+0	0
19	FW	(Canada) CAN	Carlo Corazzin	48	5	21+18	4	1+2	0	2+2	1	0+0	0	0+2	0
20	DF	(England) ENG	David Beharall	39	0	30+2	0	3+0	0	4+0	0	0+0	0	0+0	0
21	DF	(England) ENG	Fitz Hall	49	5	39+0	4	3+0	1	4+0	0	0+1	0	2+0	0
22	DF	(England) ENG	Danny Hall	2	0	0+2	0	0+0	0	0+0	0	0+0	0	0+0	0
23	DF	(Scotland) SCO	Will Haining	31	3	25+1	2	0+1	1	0+1	0	1+0	0	2+0	0
24	FW	(New Zealand) NZL	Chris Killen	34	4	11+16	3	1+2	0	2+1	1	1+0	0	0+0	0
28	MF	(England) ENG	David Eyres	49	16	40+0	13	3+0	1	4+0	1	0+0	0	2+0	1
29	DF	(England) ENG	Clint Hill	26	1	18+0	1	2+0	0	4+0	0	1+0	0	1+0	0
30	FW	(Angola) ANG	Luís Lourenço	10	1	1+6	1	0+0	0	1+1	0	1+0	0	0+0	0
31	MF	(England) ENG	Tony Carss	29	2	16+10	2	0+0	0	0+0	0	1+0	0	0+2	0
32	FW	(Netherlands) NED	Clyde Wijnhard	40	5	24+10	2	2+0	1	3+0	2	0+0	0	1+0	0
33	DF	(England) ENG	Chris Armstrong	41	1	33+0	1	3+0	0	2+0	0	1+0	0	2+0	0
34	MF	(England) ENG	Josh Low	27	4	19+2	3	2+0	1	2+0	0	0+0	0	2+0	0

== Final league table ==
Pos	Team	Pld	W	D	L	GF	GA	GD	Pts	Promotion or relegation
3	Bristol City	46	24	11	11	79	48	+31	83	Qualification for the Second Division play-offs
4	Queens Park Rangers	46	24	11	11	69	45	+24	83	Qualification for the Second Division play-offs
5	Oldham Athletic	46	22	16	8	68	38	+30	82	Qualification for the Second Division play-offs
6	Cardiff City (O, P)	46	23	12	11	68	43	+25	81	Qualification for the Second Division play-offs
7	Tranmere Rovers	46	23	11	12	66	57	+9	80	

Rules for classification: In the Football League goals scored (GF) takes precedence over goal difference (GD).
(O) Play-off winners; (P) Promoted

== Competitions ==
=== League Division 2 ===
10 August 2002 1	Oldham Athletic	1–2	Cardiff City	Oldham
	Baudet (yellow card) 27'; Hall (yellow card) 37'; Corazzin (yellow card) 65'; Duxbury 90'	Report	Campbell 21'; Earnshaw (yellow card) 82' (goal) 84'	Stadium: Boundary Park; Attendance: 8,033; Referee: Eddie Wolstenholme

13 August 2002 2	Peterborough United	0–1	Oldham Athletic	Peterborough
	Green (yellow card) 69'	Report	Killen 62'; Corazzin (yellow card) 76'	Stadium: London Road Stadium; Attendance: 5,204; Referee: Ray Olivier

17 August 2002 3	Brentford	0–0	Oldham Athletic	Brentford
		Report	Appleby (yellow card) 34'; Hall (yellow card) 35' (yellow-red card) 60'; Low (yellow card) 90'	Stadium: Griffin Park; Attendance: 5,356; Referee: Mick Fletcher

24 August 2002 4	Oldham Athletic	2–0	Tranmere Rovers	Oldham
	Low (yellow card) 39'; Hill (yellow card) 59' (goal) 69'; Hall (yellow card) 73'; Wijnhard 77'	Report	Navarro (yellow card) 22'	Stadium: Boundary Park; Attendance: 5,933; Referee: Graham Laws

26 August 2002 5	Blackpool	0–0	Oldham Athletic	Blackpool
		Report	Clegg (yellow card) 25'; Appleby (yellow card) 31' (yellow-red card) 90'; Eyres (yellow card) 43'	Stadium: Bloomfield Road; Attendance: 8,201; Referee: Tony Leake

31 August 2002 6	Oldham Athletic	0–2	Wycombe Wanderers	Oldham
	Appleby (yellow card) 72'	Report	Bulman 5'; Harris 85'	Stadium: Boundary Park; Attendance: 5,963; Referee: Alan Kaye

7 September 2002 7	Notts County	1–3	Oldham Athletic	Nottingham
	Heffernan 28'; Allsopp (yellow card) 60'	Report	Eyres 34'; Sheridan 36'; Hall (yellow card) 49'; Killen 65'	Stadium: Meadow Lane; Attendance: 5,435; Referee: Tony Bates

14 September 2002 8	Oldham Athletic	6–1	Mansfield Town	Oldham
	Wijnhard 10', 26' (pen.), 36', 70'; Corazzin 80'; Andrews 84' (pen.)	Report	Corden 19'; MacKenzie (yellow card) 80'	Stadium: Boundary Park; Attendance: 5,490; Referee: Richard Beeby

17 September 2002 9	Oldham Athletic	1–0	Bristol City	Oldham
	Wijnhard 70'; Duxbury (yellow card) 79'	Report	Doherty (yellow card) 52' (yellow-red card) 59'; Coles (yellow card) 72'	Stadium: Boundary Park; Attendance: 5,583; Referee: Colin Webster

21 September 2002 10	Colchester United	0–1	Oldham Athletic	Colchester
	Warren (red card) 56'	Report	Hill (red card) 53'; Wijnhard (yellow card) 57'; Andrews 64'	Stadium: Layer Road; Attendance: 3,021; Referee: Grant Hegley

28 September 2002 11	Oldham Athletic	4–0	Huddersfield Town	Oldham
	Wijnhard 1', 57'; Eyres 18' (yellow card) 59'; Lourenço 80'	Report	Brown (yellow card) 20'; Jenkins (yellow card) 62'	Stadium: Boundary Park; Attendance: 7,643; Referee: David Pugh

5 October 2002 12	Swindon Town	0–1	Oldham Athletic	Swindon
	Gurney (yellow card) 88'	Report	Duxbury 6'; Beharall (yellow card) 13'; Eyre (yellow card) 17'; Baudet (red card) 43'; Eyres (yellow card) 76'	Stadium: County Ground; Attendance: 4,326; Referee: Peter Walton

12 October 2002 13	Port Vale	1–1	Oldham Athletic	Stoke-on-Trent
	Collins (yellow card) 55'; McPhee 66'	Report	Holden (yellow card) 5' (goal) 49'; Sheridan (yellow card) 22'; Corazzin (yellow card) 57'	Stadium: Vale Park; Attendance: 5,563; Referee: Dermot Gallagher

19 October 2002 14	Oldham Athletic	1–2	Luton Town	Oldham
	Holden 4'; Eyre (yellow card) 17'; Carss (yellow card) 74'	Report	Fotiadis (yellow card) 8' (goal) 33'; Thorpe 58'; Brković (yellow card) 66'; Perrett (yellow card) 80'	Stadium: Boundary Park; Attendance: 6,916; Referee: Carl Boyeson

26 October 2002 15	Queens Park Rangers	1–2	Oldham Athletic	London
	Rose 2' (yellow card) 43'	Report	Sheridan (yellow card) 14'; Low 29' (yellow card) 45'; Duxbury 38'; Hall (yellow card) 39'; Eyre (yellow card) 89'; Killen (yellow card) 90'	Stadium: Loftus Road; Attendance: 15,491; Referee: Clive Wilkes

29 October 2002 16	Oldham Athletic	4–0	Northampton Town	Oldham
	Andrews 28'; Corazzin 61'; Eyres 71' (pen.); Eyre 84'	Report	Hope (yellow card) 32'	Stadium: Boundary Park; Attendance: 5,512; Referee: Roy Pearson

2 November 2002 17	Oldham Athletic	2–0	Stockport County	Oldham
	Hall 40'; Vernon 90'	Report		Stadium: Boundary Park; Attendance: 8,251; Referee: Mike Pike

9 November 2002 18	Plymouth Argyle	2–2	Oldham Athletic	Plymouth
	Stonebridge 4'; Friio 7' (yellow card) 13'; Evans (yellow card) 45'; McGlinchey (yellow card) 73'	Report	Eyres 74' (pen.); Andrews 76'; Killen (yellow card) 88'	Stadium: Home Park; Attendance: 8,216; Referee: Phil Crossley

23 November 2002 19	Oldham Athletic	0–0	Cheltenham Town	Oldham
	Sheridan (yellow card) 24'; Eyres (yellow card) 73'	Report	Finnigan (yellow card) 45'; Victory (yellow card) 57'; Devaney (yellow card) 89'	Stadium: Boundary Park; Attendance: 6,575; Referee: Mike Ryan

30 November 2002 20	Barnsley	2–2	Oldham Athletic	Barnsley
	Sheron 28'; Gibbs (yellow card) 34'; Betsy (yellow card) 45'; Dyer 89'; Morgan (yellow card) 89'	Report	Baudet 27' (yellow card) 34'; Sheridan (yellow card) 47'; Eyre (yellow card) 51'; Killen 81'	Stadium: Oakwell; Attendance: 11,222; Referee: Graham Salisbury

14 December 2002 21	Oldham Athletic	0–2	Wigan Athletic	Oldham
	Armstrong (yellow card) 24'; Sheridan (yellow card) 27' (yellow-red card) 65'; Eyres (yellow card) 63'	Report	Ellington 36'; Kennedy (yellow card) 59'; De Vos 60'; Jarrett (yellow card) 63'	Stadium: Boundary Park; Attendance: 8,269; Referee: Andy Hall

21 December 2002 22	Chesterfield	0–1	Oldham Athletic	Chesterfield
	Blatherwick (yellow card) 8'; Payne (yellow card) 19'; Booty (yellow card) 42'	Report	Murray (yellow card) 12'; Andrews (yellow card) 19'; Hall 22' (yellow card) 45'	Stadium: Saltergate; Attendance: 4,052; Referee: Joe Ross

26 December 2002 23	Oldham Athletic	1–1	Blackpool	Oldham
13:00	Baudet (yellow card) 30'; Andrews (yellow card) 37'; Haining 45'; Duxbury (yellow card) 90'	Report	Murphy 17'; Coid (yellow card) 37'; Hendry (yellow card) 45'; Richardson (yellow card) 66'; Hills (yellow card) 73'	Stadium: Boundary Park; Attendance: 9,415; Referee: Mike Jones

29 December 2002 24	Crewe Alexandra	1–2	Oldham Athletic	Crewe
	Hulse 56' (yellow card) 71'; Foster (yellow card) 61' (yellow-red card) 68'; Wright (yellow card) 79'	Report	Baudet (yellow card) 23'; Corazzin 26'; Eyres (yellow card) 36' (goal) 61' (pen.); Eyre (yellow card) 60'	Stadium: Gresty Road; Attendance: 9,006; Referee: David Elleray

1 January 2003 25	Tranmere Rovers	1–2	Oldham Athletic	Birkenhead
	Jones (yellow card) 32'; Roberts (yellow card) 37'; Haworth 59'; Jackson (yellow card) 74'	Report	Eyres 37' (pen.); Armstrong (yellow card) 54'; Hall (yellow card) 69'; Baudet 76'; Sheridan (yellow card) 90'	Stadium: Prenton Park; Attendance: 9,795; Referee: Chris Foy

4 January 2003 26	Oldham Athletic	0–0	Peterborough United	Oldham
		Report	Burton (yellow card) 89'	Stadium: Boundary Park; Attendance: 5,922; Referee: Mark Cowburn

14 January 2003 27	Oldham Athletic	2–1	Brentford	Oldham
	Hall 22' (yellow card) 65'; Duxbury (yellow card) 31' (goal) 46'; Baudet (yellow card) 51'; Killen (yellow card) 53'; Burgess (yellow card) 66'; Pogliacomi (red card) 90'	Report	O'Connor 28'; Frampton (yellow card) 56'; McCammon (yellow card) 59'	Stadium: Boundary Park; Attendance: 5,039; Referee: Mark Clattenburg

18 January 2003 28	Wycombe Wanderers	2–2	Oldham Athletic	Wycombe
	Ryan (yellow card) 50'; Harris 71'; Brown 83' (pen.)	Report	Andrews 26'; Baudet (red card) 47'; Armstrong (yellow card) 82'; Carss 84'	Stadium: Adams Park; Attendance: 6,226; Referee: Clive Penton

25 January 2003 29	Oldham Athletic	1–3	Crewe Alexandra	Oldham
	Hall (red card) 28'; Armstrong 64'; Andrews (yellow card) 68'	Report	Hulse 60', 86'; Ashton 88'	Stadium: Boundary Park; Attendance: 7,597; Referee: Alan Butler

31 January 2003 30	Cardiff City	1–1	Oldham Athletic	Cardiff
	Bowen 35'; Gordon (yellow card) 90'; Weston (yellow card) 90'	Report	Eyres 87'	Stadium: Ninian Park; Attendance: 12,579; Referee: Peter Walton

8 February 2003 31	Oldham Athletic	0–1	Plymouth Argyle	Oldham
	Andrews (yellow card) 90'; Haining (yellow card) 90'	Report	Evans 39'	Stadium: Boundary Park; Attendance: 6,657; Referee: Howard Webb

15 February 2003 32	Stockport County	1–2	Oldham Athletic	Stockport
	Daly 46' (yellow card) 78'	Report	Murray 9'; Carss (yellow card) 82'; Eyres 89'	Stadium: Edgeley Park; Attendance: 8,168; Referee: Phil Prosser

22 February 2003 33	Oldham Athletic	1–1	Notts County	Oldham
	Andrews 44'	Report	Richardson (yellow card) 43'; Heffernan 85'	Stadium: Boundary Park; Attendance: 5,657; Referee: Graham Salisbury

1 March 2003 34	Mansfield Town	0–1	Oldham Athletic	Mansfield
	Day (yellow card) 16'; Lawrence (yellow card) 21'; Christie (yellow card) 37'; Curtis (yellow card) 44'; Eaton (yellow card) 64'; Curle (red card) 90'	Report	Eyres (red card) 34'; Hall (yellow card) 41'; Haining (yellow card) 44'; Hall 88' (pen.); Murray (yellow card) 90'	Stadium: Field Mill; Attendance: 5,712; Referee: Paul Taylor

4 March 2003 35	Bristol City	2–0	Oldham Athletic	Bristol
	Murray 54'; Roberts 90'	Report		Stadium: Ashton Gate Stadium; Attendance: 11,194; Referee: Trevor Parkes

8 March 2003 36	Oldham Athletic	2–0	Colchester United	Oldham
	Eyre 13' (yellow card) 73'; Eyres 19'	Report	White (red card) 45'	Stadium: Boundary Park; Attendance: 5,223; Referee: Paul Danson

15 March 2003 37	Oldham Athletic	0–0	Queens Park Rangers	Oldham
	Wijnhard (yellow card) 50'; Sheridan (yellow card) 82'	Report	Furlong (yellow card) 16'; Langley (yellow card) 38'; Cook (yellow card) 64'	Stadium: Boundary Park; Attendance: 7,242; Referee: Andy Hall

18 March 2003 38	Luton Town	0–0	Oldham Athletic	Luton
	Thorpe (yellow card) 44'; Hillier (yellow card) 90'; Howard (yellow card) 90'	Report		Stadium: Kenilworth Road; Attendance: 6,142; Referee: Rob Styles

22 March 2003 39	Northampton Town	0–2	Oldham Athletic	Northampton
		Report	Low (yellow card) 55'; Andrews 67', 89'; Murray (yellow card) 86'	Stadium: Sixfields Stadium; Attendance: 5,646; Referee: Steve Tomlin

29 March 2003 40	Oldham Athletic	1–1	Port Vale	Oldham
	Eyres 28'	Report	Durnin (yellow card) 31'; Cummins 36'; McPhee (yellow card) 90'	Stadium: Boundary Park; Attendance: 7,209; Referee: Paul Rejer

5 April 2003 41	Oldham Athletic	2–1	Barnsley	Oldham
	Andrews 4' (yellow card) 61'; Low 56'	Report	Mulligan 21'; Austin (yellow card) 41'; Lumsdon (yellow card) 61'; Neil (yellow card) 63'; Morgan (yellow card) 78'	Stadium: Boundary Park; Attendance: 6,191; Referee: Alan Butler

12 April 2003 42	Cheltenham Town	1–1	Oldham Athletic	Cheltenham
	Yates 2' (yellow card) 15'	Report	Eyres 31'	Stadium: Whaddon Road; Attendance: 4,439; Referee: Steve Baines

19 April 2003 43	Oldham Athletic	4–0	Chesterfield	Oldham
	Andrews 20'; Wijnhard 26', 75'; Eyres 79'	Report	Hurst (yellow card) 12'; Folan (yellow card) 71'	Stadium: Boundary Park; Attendance: 6,885; Referee: Paul Robinson

21 April 2003 44	Wigan Athletic	3–1	Oldham Athletic	Wigan
	Roberts 9', 80'; Bullard 71'; Teale (yellow card) 86'	Report	Andrews 1' (yellow card) 55'; Baudet (yellow card) 60'	Stadium: JJB Stadium; Attendance: 12,783; Referee: Paul Danson

26 April 2003 45	Oldham Athletic	4–0	Swindon Town	Oldham
	Low 27'; Eyres 31'; Haining 79'; Corazzin 83'	Report	Robinson (yellow card) 19'; Gurney (yellow card) 71'; Reeves (yellow card) 77'	Stadium: Boundary Park; Attendance: 6,873; Referee: Alan Kaye

3 May 2003 46	Huddersfield Town	1–1	Oldham Athletic	Huddersfield
	Schofield 26'	Report	Carss 68'	Stadium: McAlpine Stadium; Attendance: 11,271; Referee: Mike Ryan

=== League Division 2 Play-Offs ===
20 May 2003 1	Oldham Athletic	1–1	Queens Park Rangers	Oldham
	Sheridan (yellow card) 12'; Eyres 28'; Andrews (yellow card) 32'	Report	Rose (yellow card) 24'; Bircham (yellow card) 38'; Langley 41' (yellow card) 79' (yellow-red card) 80'; Shittu (yellow card) 51'; Forbes (yellow card) 68'; Pacquette (yellow card) 90'	Stadium: Boundary Park; Attendance: 12,152; Referee: Steve Bennett

14 May 2003 1	Queens Park Rangers	1–0	Oldham Athletic	London
	Gallen (yellow card) 63'; Furlong 82'	Report	Eyre (yellow card) 65'; Andrews (red card) 90'	Stadium: Loftus Road; Attendance: 17,201; Referee: Mark Clattenburg

=== F.A. Cup ===
16 November 2002 1	Oldham Athletic	2–2	Burton Albion	Oldham
	Low 18'; Hall (yellow card) 22' (goal) 90'; Eyres (yellow card) 38'	Report	Hoyle (red card); Webster 42' (pen.); Kirkwood (yellow card) 58'; Dudley 59' (yellow card) 60'	Stadium: Boundary Park; Attendance: 5,802; Referee: Mike Jones

27 November 2002 2	Burton Albion	2–2 (a.e.t.) (4–5 p)	Oldham Athletic	Burton upon Trent
	Kirkwood (yellow card) 29'; Clough (yellow card) 80'; Moore 84', 110' (yellow card) 85'	Report	Wijnhard 59'; Armstrong (yellow card) 59'; Andrews (yellow card) 72'; Eyres 116'	Stadium: Eton Park; Attendance: 3,416; Referee: Mike Jones
	Penalties
	Webster (penalty missed); Sinton (penalty scored); Anderson (penalty missed); Stride (penalty scored); Clough (penalty scored); Glasser (penalty scored); Reddington (penalty missed)		Wijnhard (penalty missed); Eyres (penalty scored); Killen (penalty scored); Hall (penalty scored); Sheridan (penalty missed); Hill (penalty scored); Corazzin (penalty scored)

7 December 2002 3	Oldham Athletic	1–2	Cheltenham Town	Oldham
	Eyres (yellow card) 50'; Haining 83'	Report	Yates 17'; Brough (yellow card) 19'; Brayson 20'	Stadium: Boundary Park; Attendance: 4,416; Referee: Graham Laws

=== Football League Cup ===
10 September 2002 1	Oldham Athletic	3–2	Notts County	Oldham
	Killen 10'; Carss 45'; Wijnhard 81'	Report	Stallard 16'; Allsopp (yellow card) 55'; Caskey (yellow card) 57'; Heffernan 75'; Liburd (yellow card) 80'	Stadium: Boundary Park; Attendance: 4,205; Referee: Paul Rejer

2 October 2002 2	Derby County	1–2 (a.e.t.)	Oldham Athletic	Derby
	Higginbotham 17' (pen.); Christie (yellow card) 30'; Riggott (yellow card) 76'; Poom (yellow card) 94' (yellow-red card) 105'; Morris (yellow card) 120'	Report	Eyres 18'; Wijnhard 95' (pen.); Holden (yellow card) 111'	Stadium: Pride Park Stadium; Attendance: 9,029; Referee: Brian Curson

6 November 2002 3	West Ham United	0–1	Oldham Athletic	London
	Dailly (yellow card) 44'; Defoe (yellow card) 59'; Schemmel (yellow card) 67'; Camara (yellow card) 90'; Pearce (yellow card) 90'	Report	Corazzin 42'; Murray (yellow card) 60'; Hill (yellow card) 89'; Hall (yellow card) 90'	Stadium: Upton Park; Attendance: 21,919; Referee: Uriah Rennie

3 December 2002 4	Crystal Palace	2–0	Oldham Athletic	London
	Black 11', 74'; Granville (red card) 45'	Report	Sheridan (yellow card) 76'; Eyres (yellow card) 83'; Andrews (yellow card) 87'	Stadium: Selhurst Park; Attendance: 7,431; Referee: Chris Foy

=== Football League Trophy (LDV Vans Trophy) ===
22 October 2002 1	Oldham Athletic	3–4 (a.e.t.)	Carlisle United	Oldham
	Andrews 19'; Vernon 77', 79'	Report	Osman 25', 59'; Kelly (yellow card) 35'; Farrell 63', 97'	Stadium: Boundary Park; Attendance: 2,821; Referee: Steve Baines
