= 2003–04 Oldham Athletic A.F.C. season =

Oldham Athletic A.F.C.
2003–04 season
- Chairman: David Brierley
- Manager: Brian Talbot
- Stadium: Boundary Park
- Second Division: 15th
- FA Cup: Second round
- League Cup: First round
- Football League Trophy: Second round
- Top goalscorer: League: Scott Vernon (13); All: Scott Vernon (15)
- Highest home attendance: 13,007 vs. Grimsby Town
- Lowest home attendance: 2,812 vs. Accrington Stanley
Home colours	Away colours

During the 2003–04 English football season, Oldham Athletic A.F.C. competed in the Football League Second Division.

== League table ==
Pos	Team	Pld	W	D	L	GF	GA	GD	Pts
13	Wrexham	46	17	9	20	50	60	−10	60
14	Blackpool	46	16	11	19	58	65	−7	59
15	Oldham Athletic	46	12	21	13	66	60	+6	57
16	Sheffield Wednesday	46	13	14	19	48	64	−16	53
17	Brentford	46	14	11	21	52	69	−17	53

Rules for classification: In the Football League goals scored (GF) takes precedence over goal difference (GD).

== Results ==
Home team's score comes first

=== Legend ===
Win	Draw	Loss

=== Football League Second Division ===
Second Division match details
Date	Opponent	Venue	Result F–A	Scorers	Attendance
9 August 2003	Brighton & Hove Albion	H	1–3	Murray 82'	6,522
16 August 2003	Sheffield Wednesday	A	2–2	J. Sheridan 5' (pen.), Antoine-Curier 55'	24,630
23 August 2003	Blackpool	H	2–3	Eyre 1', Antoine-Curier 90'	6,745
25 August 2003	Brentford	A	1–2	Holden 17'	4,073
30 August 2003	Rushden & Diamonds	H	3–2	J. Sheridan 11' (pen.), Haining 75', O'Halloran 90'	5,469
6 September 2003	Hartlepool United	A	0–0		5,728
13 September 2003	Bristol City	H	1–1	Zola 54'	5,921
16 September 2003	Barnsley	A	1–1	Vernon 65'	10,102
20 September 2003	Wycombe Wanderers	A	5–2	Murray 1', 85', D. Hall 16', Zola 21', Killen 75' (pen.)	4,725
27 September 2003	Luton Town	H	3–0	J. Sheridan 30' pen., Zola 45', Holden 47'	6,077
30 September 2003	Stockport County	H	2–0	J. Sheridan 11' (pen.), Vernon 46'	7,015
4 October 2003	Peterborough United	A	2–2	Cooksey 8', J. Sheridan 57' (pen.)	4,465
11 October 2003	Port Vale	H	2–1	Killen 71', Eyres87'	6,913
18 October 2003	Tranmere Rovers	A	1–2	Eyre 30'	8,202
21 October 2003	Wrexham	A	0–4		3,963
25 October 2003	Bournemouth	H	1–1	Vernon 30'	5,850
1 November 2003	Plymouth Argyle	A	2–2	Beharall 10', 63'	11,205
15 November 2003	Swindon Town	H	0–1		5,282
22 November 2003	Chesterfield	A	1–1	Zola 55'	3,565
29 November 2003	Notts County	H	0–1		5,190
13 December 2003	Colchester United	A	1–2	Eyres 66'	2,897
20 December 2003	Queens Park Rangers	H	2–1	Cooksey 67', Eyre 86'	5,603
26 December 2003	Grimsby Town	A	3–3	Johnson 19', Cooksey 32', Vernon 73'	6,172
28 December 2003	Hartlepool United	H	0–2		6,243
3 January 2004	Brentford	H	1–1	Vernon 54'	4,990
10 January 2004	Brighton & Hove Albion	A	0–0		6,036
17 January 2004	Sheffield Wednesday	H	1–0	Vernon 17'	9,316
24 January 2004	Blackpool	H	1–1	Vernon 68'	7,508
31 January 2004	Rushden & Diamonds	A	1–4	Johnson 55'	4,591
8 February 2004	Grimsby Town	H	6–0	Vernon 9', 16', 45', Griffin 27', Johnson 34', Zola 88'	13,007
14 February 2004	Port Vale	A	0–1		6,035
21 February 2004	Tranmere Rovers	H	1–1	Vernon 60'	6,916
28 February 2004	Bournemouth	A	0–1		6,594
6 March 2004	Queens Park Rangers	A	1–1	Murray 45'	13,696
13 March 2004	Colchester United	H	0–0		5,937
16 March 2004	Barnsley	H	1–1	Murray 53'	5,837
20 March 2004	Bristol City	A	2–0	Cooksey 26', Murray 36'	11,037
27 March 2004	Wycombe Wanderers	H	2–3	Murray 18', Eyre 44'	5,758
3 April 2004	Luton Town	A	1–1	Crowe 33'	5,966
10 April 2004	Peterborough United	H	1–1	Vernon 90'	5,688
12 April 2004	Stockport County	A	1–1	Haining 1'	8,617
17 April 2004	Plymouth Argyle	H	4–1	Johnson 34', Owen 42', Eyres 45', Murray 67'	6,924
20 April 2004	Wrexham	H	1–1	Holden 45'	5,646
24 April 2004	Swindon Town	A	2–1	Murray 8', Johnson 74'	8,506
1 May 2004	Chesterfield	H	2–0	Eyre 50', 81	8,177
8 May 2004	Notts County	A	1–1	Holden 61'	6,715

=== FA Cup ===
Round	Date	Opponent	Venue	Result
R1	8 November 2003	Carlisle	H	3–0
R2	6 December 2003	Blackpool	H	2–5

=== League Cup ===
Round	Date	Opponent	Venue	Result
R1	12 August 2003	Scunthorpe	A	2–1

=== Football League Trophy ===
Round	Date	Opponent	Venue	Result
R1	14 October 2003	Hartlepool	H	3–3 (won on penalties)
R2	3 November 2003	Bury	A	2–1

== Players ==
=== First-team squad ===
Note: Flags indicate national team as defined under FIFA eligibility rules; some limited exceptions apply. Players may hold more than one non-FIFA nationality.

No.	Pos.	Nation	Player
1	GK	AUS	Les Pogliacomi
2	DF	ENG	Dean Holden
3	MF	ENG	Darren Sheridan
4	MF	ENG	Ernie Cooksey
6	DF	WAL	Gareth Owen (Note: Owen was born in Cheadle, England, but also qualified to represent Wales internationally and played for them at U-19 level.) (on loan from Stoke City)
7	MF	ENG	Paul Murray
8	MF	IRL	John Sheridan (Note: Sheridan was born in Stretford, England, but also qualified to represent the Republic of Ireland internationally and represented them at U-21 level before making his international debut for the Republic of Ireland in 1988.)
9	FW	COD	Calvin Zola (on loan from Newcastle United)
10	FW	ENG	John Eyre
11	MF	ENG	Matty Appleby
12	MF	ENG	Wes Wilkinson
13	GK	ENG	Chris Grange
14	DF	ENG	Michael Clegg
15	GK	ENG	Keiren Westwood (Note: Westwood was born in Manchester, England, but also qualified to represent the Republic of Ireland internationally and would make his debut for the Republic of Ireland in May 2009.) (on loan from Manchester City)
16	DF	ENG	Kelvin Lomax
17	FW	ENG	Scott Vernon
18	MF	ENG	Danny Boshell
19	FW	ENG	Craig Fleming

No.	Pos.	Nation	Player
20	DF	ENG	David Beharall
22	DF	ENG	Danny Hall
23	DF	SCO	Will Haining
24	FW	NZL	Chris Killen
25	MF	ENG	Mark Bonner
26	DF	ENG	Adam Griffin
27	DF	ENG	Marc Tierney
28	MF	ENG	David Eyres
29	FW	ENG	Chris Hall
30	MF	ENG	Matthew Wolfenden
31	GK	ENG	Steve Corry
32	FW	ENG	Dean Crowe
33	FW	JAM	Jermaine Johnson (on loan from Bolton Wanderers)
34	FW	ENG	Matty Barlow
35	MF	ENG	Danny Forde
37	DF	ENG	Rob Walker
38	MF	ENG	Carlos Roca

=== Left club during season ===
Note: Flags indicate national team as defined under FIFA eligibility rules; some limited exceptions apply. Players may hold more than one non-FIFA nationality.

No.	Pos.	Nation	Player
5	DF	COD	Kangana Ndiwa (Note: Ndiwa was born in Maquela do Zombo, Angola, but was raised in Sweden from the age of seven and represented them at U-17, U-18 and U-19 level before making his international debut for the Democratic Republic of the Congo in 2004.) (on loan from Bolton Wanderers)
6	DF	ENG	Mark Hudson (on loan from Fulham)
12	FW	FRA	Mickaël Antoine-Curier (Note: Antoine-Curier was born in Orsay, France, but also qualified to represent Guadeloupe internationally and would make his debut for Guadeloupe in 2008.) (to Kidderminster Harriers)
15	MF	AUS	David Carney (to Halifax Town)

No.	Pos.	Nation	Player
15	GK	ENG	Adam Collin (on loan from Newcastle United)
16	MF	ENG	Matt O'Halloran (to Chesterfield)
16	MF	ENG	Steven Schumacher (on loan from Everton)
