= 2004–05 Oldham Athletic A.F.C. season =

Oldham Athletic
2004–05 season
- Chairman: Simon Blitz
- Manager: Brian Talbot/Ronnie Moore
- Stadium: Boundary Park
- Football League One: 19th
- FA Cup: Fourth round
- League Cup: Second round
- Football League Trophy: Area final
- Top goalscorer: League: Chris Killen (10); All: Chris Killen (15)
Home colours	Away colours

During the 2004–05 English football season, Oldham Athletic A.F.C. competed in the Football League One finishing 19th. The club enjoyed success in the cups – reaching the 4th round of the FA Cup and the area final of the Football League Trophy.

== Season summary ==
A poor season in the league saw the club finishing 19th, with relegation avoided after manager Brian Talbot was replaced by Ronnie Moore towards the end of the season. Talbot's side had enjoyed cup success, particularly the defeat of Man City in the FA Cup third round. The club also reached the area final of the Football League Trophy for the first time.

== League table ==
Pos	Team	Pld	W	D	L	GF	GA	GD	Pts	Promotion or relegation
17	Chesterfield	46	14	15	17	55	62	−7	57	
18	Port Vale	46	17	5	24	49	59	−10	56	
19	Oldham Athletic	46	14	10	22	60	73	−13	52	
20	Milton Keynes Dons	46	12	15	19	54	68	−14	51	
21	Torquay United (R)	46	12	15	19	55	79	−24	51	Relegation to Football League Two

Updated to match(es) played on May 2005. Source:
Rules for classification: 1) points; 2) goal difference; 3) number of goals scored.
(R) Relegated

== Results ==
Home team's score comes first

=== Legend ===
Win	Draw	Loss

=== Football League One ===
Date	Opponent	Venue	Result
7 August 2004	Luton	A	2–1
10 August 2004	Wrexham	H	2–3
14 August 2004	Walsall	H	5–3
21 August 2004	Hull	A	2–0
28 August 2004	MK Dons	H	3–0
30 August 2004	Sheff Weds	A	1–1
11 September 2004	Hartlepool	H	3–2
14 September 2004	Tranmere	A	2–0
18 September 2004	Doncaster	A	1–1
25 September 2004	Colchester	H	1–1
2 October 2004	Brentford	A	2–0
10 October 2004	Blackpool	H	1–2
16 October 2004	Swindon	A	1–0
19 October 2004	Bristol C	H	0–0
23 October 2004	Bournemouth	H	1–2
30 October 2004	Stockport	A	1–2
6 November 2004	Torquay	A	2–0
20 November 2004	Barnsley	H	3–2
27 November 2004	Bradford	A	1–3
7 December 2004	Chesterfield	H	4–1
11 December 2004	Huddersfield	H	2–1
18 December 2004	Port Vale	A	3–1
26 December 2004	Hartlepool	A	2–1
28 December 2004	Peterborough	H	2–1
1 January 2005	Tranmere	H	2–2
3 January 2005	Colchester	A	0–0
15 January 2005	Doncaster	H	1–2
22 January 2005	Peterborough	A	1–2
5 February 2005	Swindon	H	1–2
8 February 2005	Blackpool	A	2–0
12 February 2005	Bournemouth	A	4–0
19 February 2005	Stockport	H	1–2
22 February 2005	Bristol C	A	5–1
26 February 2005	Huddersfield	A	2–1
5 March 2005	Port Vale	H	3–0
12 March 2005	Wrexham	A	1–0
15 March 2005	Brentford	H	0–2
19 March 2005	Luton	H	2–2
26 March 2005	Walsall	A	0–1
28 March 2005	Hull	H	1–0
2 April 2005	MK Dons	A	1–1
9 April 2005	Sheff Weds	H	1–1
16 April 2005	Barnsley	A	2–2
23 April 2005	Torquay	H	1–2
30 April 2005	Chesterfield	A	1–0
7 July 2005	Bradford	H	2–1

=== FA Cup ===
Round	Date	Opponent	Venue	Result
R1	14 November 2004	Thurrock	A	0–1
R2	4 December 2004	Leyton Orient	H	4–0
R3	8 January 2005	Man City	H	1–0
R4	30 January 2005	Bolton	H	0–1

=== League Cup ===
Round	Date	Opponent	Venue	Result
R1	24 August 2004	Stoke	H	2–1
R2	22 September 2004	Tottenham	H	0–6

=== Football League Trophy ===
Round	Date	Opponent	Venue	Result
R2	2 November 2004	Accrington	H	3–2
Area Quarter Final	30 November 2004	Hartlepool	H	3–1
Area Semi Final	25 January 2005	Tranmere	H	1–1 (won on penalties)
Area Final (1st leg)	15 February 2005	Wrexham	H	3–5
Area Final 2nd leg	8 March 2005	Wrexham	A	1–0 (lost 6–3 on aggregate)

== Players ==
=== First-team squad ===
Note: Flags indicate national team as defined under FIFA eligibility rules; some limited exceptions apply. Players may hold more than one non-FIFA nationality.

No.	Pos.	Nation	Player
1	GK	AUS	Les Pogliacomi
2	DF	ENG	Dean Holden
3	DF	ENG	Adam Griffin
4	MF	ENG	Mark Bonner
5	DF	SCO	Will Haining
6	DF	NED	Stefan Stam
7	FW	GRN	Delroy Facey
8	MF	ENG	Danny Boshell
9	FW	VIN	Rodney Jack
10	FW	ENG	John Eyre
11	MF	JAM	Jermaine Johnson
12	FW	NZL	Chris Killen
13	GK	ENG	Steve Mildenhall
14	FW	ENG	Luke Beckett (on loan from Sheffield United)
15	DF	ENG	Danny Hall
16	FW	USA	Kenny Cooper (on loan from Manchester United)

No.	Pos.	Nation	Player
17	FW	ENG	Scott Vernon
18	FW	ENG	Wes Wilkinson
19	DF	ENG	Marc Tierney
20	DF	ENG	Guy Branston
22	DF	WAL	Gareth Owen (on loan from Stoke City)
23	MF	SEY	Kevin Betsy
24	MF	NIR	Mark Hughes (on loan from Tottenham Hotspur)
25	MF	AUS	Neil Kilkenny (on loan from Birmingham City)
26	MF	FRA	Amadou Sanokho (on loan from Burnley)
28	MF	ENG	David Eyres
29	DF	ENG	Rob Walker
30	MF	ENG	Ashley Winn
32	DF	ENG	Kelvin Lomax
33	FW	ENG	Matty Barlow
34	FW	ENG	Chris Hall
35	FW	ENG	Matthew Wolfenden

=== Left club during season ===
Note: Flags indicate national team as defined under FIFA eligibility rules; some limited exceptions apply. Players may hold more than one non-FIFA nationality.

No.	Pos.	Nation	Player
6	DF	RSA	Mark Arber
7	MF	ENG	Matty Appleby
13	GK	ENG	Craig Mawson
14	FW	ENG	Alex Bruce (on loan from Birmingham City)
14	FW	ENG	Aaron Wilbraham (on loan from Hull City)

No.	Pos.	Nation	Player
16	MF	ENG	David Lee
16	MF	ENG	Rob Lee
20	DF	ENG	David Beharall
22	MF	ENG	Lee Croft (on loan from Manchester City)
