= James Olsen =

James Olsen may refer to:

- James Olsen (footballer) (born 1981), English footballer
- Jimmy Olsen, a DC Comics character
- Jimmy Olsen (wrestler) (born 1986), American professional wrestler

== See also ==
- James Olson (disambiguation)
