= 2000–01 Tranmere Rovers F.C. season =

Tranmere Rovers
2000–01 season
- Chairman: Lorraine Rogers
- Manager: John Aldridge (until 17 March); Ray Mathias/Kevin Sheedy (caretakers from 18 March)
- Stadium: Prenton Park
- First Division: 24th (relegated)
- FA Cup: Quarter-finals
- League Cup: Fourth round
- Top goalscorer: League: Koumas (10); All: Koumas (11)
- Average home league attendance: 9,049

During the 2000–01 English football season, Tranmere Rovers F.C. competed in the Football League First Division.

== Season summary ==
In the 2000–01 season, the all-white kit was reintroduced and they enjoyed yet another run in Cup competitions. In the FA Cup, Tranmere stunned local Premier League team Everton 3–0 at Goodison Park in the fourth round, then Southampton 4–3 in the fifth round replay after being 0–3 down. Their run of good fortune ended with a loss to Liverpool in the FA Cup quarter finals. They nevertheless struggled in League matches, Aldridge quit before Tranmere's relegation to Division Two ended a spell of ten years in Division One.

== Final league table ==
Pos	Team	Pld	W	D	L	GF	GA	GD	Pts	Qualification or relegation
20	Portsmouth	46	10	19	17	47	59	−12	49	
21	Crystal Palace	46	12	13	21	57	70	−13	49	
22	Huddersfield Town (R)	46	11	15	20	48	57	−9	48	Relegation to the Second Division
23	Queens Park Rangers (R)	46	7	19	20	45	75	−30	40	Relegation to the Second Division
24	Tranmere Rovers (R)	46	9	11	26	46	77	−31	38	Relegation to the Second Division

Rules for classification: 1) Points; 2) Goal difference; 3) Goals scored
(R) Relegated

== Results ==
Tranmere Rovers' score comes first

=== Legend ===
Win	Draw	Loss

=== Football League First Division ===
Date	Opponent	Venue	Result	Attendance	Scorers
12 August 2000	Wimbledon	A	0–0	8,266	
19 August 2000	Gillingham	H	3–2	8,355	Gill, Flynn, Hill
26 August 2000	Sheffield United	A	0–2	12,074	
28 August 2000	Bolton Wanderers	H	0–1	9,350	
1 September 2000	Stockport County	H	2–1	7,229	Allison, Gill (pen)
9 September 2000	Wolverhampton Wanderers	A	2–1	17,252	Allison, Barlow (pen)
12 September 2000	Portsmouth	A	0–2	9,235	
16 September 2000	Sheffield Wednesday	H	2–0	9,352	Taylor (2)
23 September 2000	Birmingham City	A	0–2	17,640	
30 September 2000	Crewe Alexandra	H	1–3	8,162	Parkinson
6 October 2000	Burnley	H	2–3	10,153	Koumas, Hill
14 October 2000	Preston North End	A	0–1	14,511	
17 October 2000	Barnsley	A	1–1	12,412	Allison
21 October 2000	West Bromwich Albion	H	2–2	8,931	Butler (own goal), Barlow
25 October 2000	Blackburn Rovers	A	2–3	17,010	Koumas, Taylor
28 October 2000	Queens Park Rangers	H	1–1	7,263	Koumas
4 November 2000	Norwich City	A	0–1	13,688	
11 November 2000	Watford	H	2–0	8,858	Hill, Taylor
18 November 2000	Crystal Palace	A	2–3	14,221	Koumas, Hill
25 November 2000	Nottingham Forest	A	1–3	19,678	Hill
2 December 2000	Blackburn Rovers	H	1–1	10,063	Parkinson
9 December 2000	Grimsby Town	H	2–0	7,119	Parkinson, Koumas
16 December 2000	Fulham	A	1–3	13,157	Koumas
23 December 2000	Wimbledon	H	0–4	8,058	
26 December 2000	Huddersfield Town	A	0–3	14,043	
1 January 2001	Sheffield United	H	1–0	8,474	Parkinson
13 January 2001	Bolton Wanderers	A	0–2	15,493	
3 February 2001	Stockport County	A	1–1	7,804	Rideout
10 February 2001	Wolverhampton Wanderers	H	0–2	9,678	
13 February 2001	Sheffield Wednesday	A	0–1	15,444	
27 February 2001	Huddersfield Town	H	2–0	10,621	Allison, Yates
3 March 2001	Crewe Alexandra	A	1–3	7,157	Parkinson
6 March 2001	Preston North End	H	1–1	10,335	Allison
14 March 2001	Portsmouth	H	1–1	9,872	Allison
17 March 2001	Barnsley	H	2–3	8,484	Taylor, Koumas
20 March 2001	Gillingham	A	1–2	7,810	Koumas
25 March 2001	West Bromwich Albion	A	1–2	17,151	Koumas
30 March 2001	Fulham	H	1–4	12,362	Osborn
7 April 2001	Grimsby Town	A	1–3	5,816	Koumas
10 April 2001	Birmingham City	H	1–0	8,004	N'Diaye
14 April 2001	Norwich City	H	0–1	9,303	
16 April 2001	Queens Park Rangers	A	0–2	9,696	
21 April 2001	Crystal Palace	H	1–1	8,119	Parkinson
24 April 2001	Burnley	A	1–2	13,717	Yates
28 April 2001	Watford	A	1–1	16,063	N'Diaye
6 May 2001	Nottingham Forest	H	2–2	9,891	Rideout, Mellon

=== FA Cup ===
Round	Date	Opponent	Venue	Result	Attendance	Goalscorers
R3	6 January 2001	Portsmouth	A	2–1	11,058	Yates, Parkinson
R4	27 January 2001	Everton	A	3–0	39,207	Yates (2), Koumas
R5	17 February 2001	Southampton	A	0–0	15,232	
R5R	20 February 2001	Southampton	H	4–3	12,910	Rideout (3), Barlow
QF	11 March 2001	Liverpool	H	2–4	16,342	Yates, Allison

=== League Cup ===
Round	Date	Opponent	Venue	Result	Attendance	Goalscorers
R1 1st Leg	22 August 2000	Halifax Town	H	3–0	4,405	Allison, Rideout, Gill
R1 2nd Leg	6 September 2000	Halifax Town	A	2–1 (won 5–1 on agg)	612	Rideout, Barlow
R2 1st Leg	19 September 2000	Swindon Town	H	1–1	4,289	Hill
R2 2nd Leg	26 September 2000	Swindon Town	A	1–0 (won 2–1 on agg)	4,753	Taylor
R3	31 October 2000	Leeds United	H	3–2 (a.e.t.)	11,681	Parkinson (2), Yates
R4	28 November 2000	Crystal Palace	A	0–0 (lost 5–6 on pens)	10,271	

== First-team squad ==
Squad at end of season

Note: Flags indicate national team as defined under FIFA eligibility rules; some limited exceptions apply. Players may hold more than one non-FIFA nationality.

No.	Pos.	Nation	Player
1	GK	NED	John Achterberg
2	DF	ENG	Steve Yates
3	DF	WAL	Gareth Roberts
4	FW	ENG	Wayne Allison
5	DF	ENG	Dave Challinor
6	DF	ENG	Clint Hill
7	MF	ENG	Wayne Gill
8	MF	ENG	Nick Henry
9	FW	ENG	Andy Parkinson
10	FW	ENG	Scott Taylor
11	FW	ENG	Stuart Barlow
12	MF	WAL	Alan Morgan
13	GK	IRL	Joe Murphy
14	DF	ENG	Reuben Hazell
15	DF	ENG	Graham Allen
16	MF	WAL	Jason Koumas
18	DF	ENG	Richard Hinds

No.	Pos.	Nation	Player
19	MF	ENG	Ian Sharps
20	FW	ENG	Paul Aldridge
21	FW	ENG	Alex Hay
22	FW	SCO	Iain Hume
23	GK	ENG	Eric Nixon
24	FW	ENG	Perry Taylor
25	FW	ENG	Paul Rideout
26	MF	ENG	Sean Flynn
27	MF	ENG	Des Hamilton (on loan from Newcastle United)
28	GK	ENG	Andy Ralph
30	MF	ENG	Danny Harrison
31	DF	ENG	Richard Jobson
32	MF	SCO	Micky Mellon
33	FW	SEN	Seyni N'Diaye
34	DF	IRL	Jeff Kenna (on loan from Blackburn Rovers)
35	MF	ENG	Simon Osborn
36	MF	ENG	James Olsen

=== Left club during season ===
Note: Flags indicate national team as defined under FIFA eligibility rules; some limited exceptions apply. Players may hold more than one non-FIFA nationality.

No. / Pos. / Nation / Player; 17 / MF / ENG / Michael Black (to Southend United)	No. / Pos. / Nation / Player; 29 / GK / NOR / Thomas Myhre (on loan from Everton)
