= James Olson =

James Olson may refer to:

- James Olson (actor) (1930–2022), American actor
- James C. Olson (1917–2005), 17th president of the University of Missouri System
- James S. Olson, American professor of history at Sam Houston State University
- Jim Olson (born 1940), Seattle architect

== See also ==
- James Olsen (disambiguation)
