= Clint Hill (footballer) =

English footballer (born 1978)

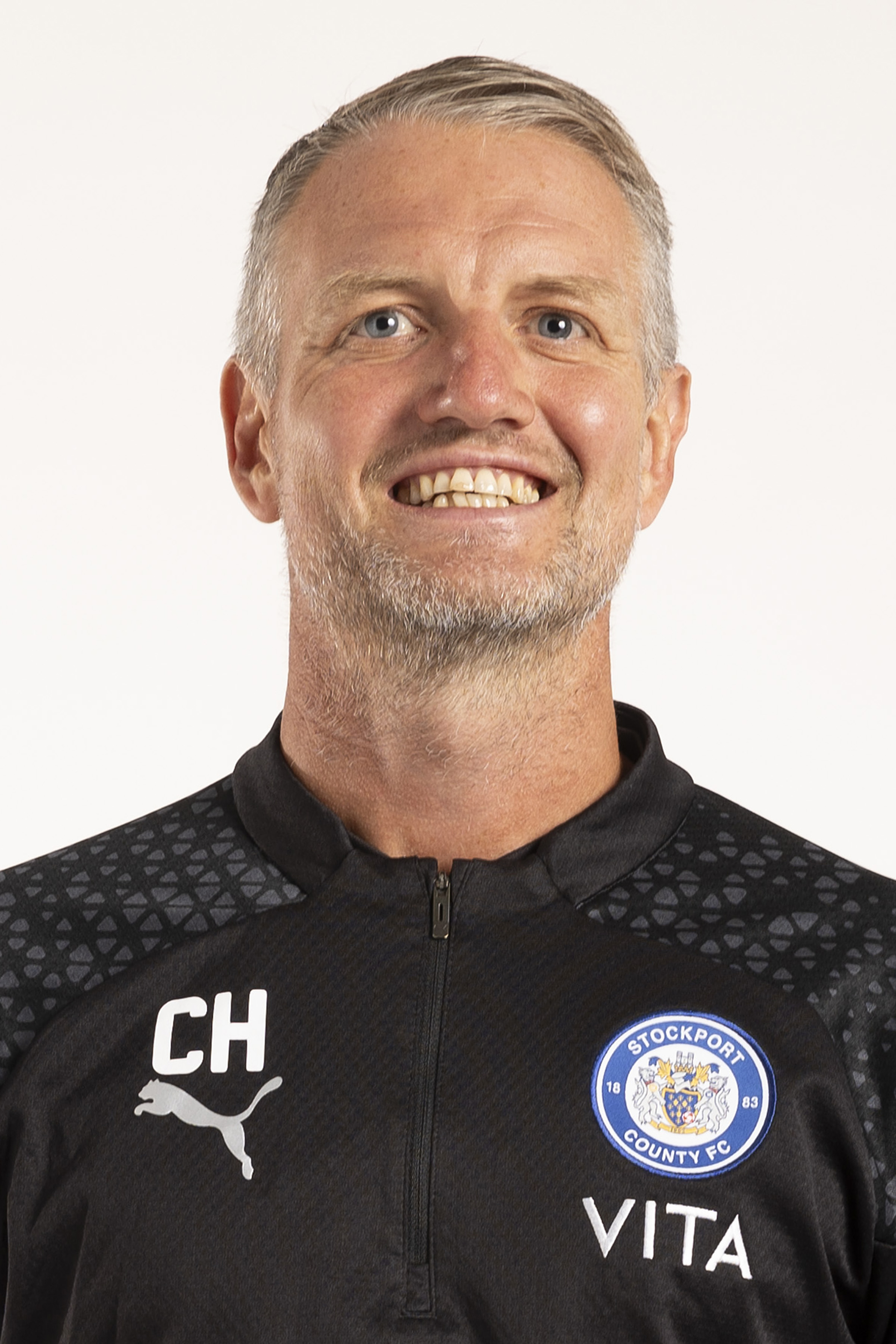
- Clint Hill, Stockport County FC

Personal information
- Full name: Clinton Scott Hill
- Date of birth: 19 October 1978 (age 48)
- Place of birth: Huyton, England
- Height: 1.83 m (6 ft 0 in)
- Position: Defender

Team information
- Current team: Sheffield Wednesday (assistant coach)

Youth career
- 1994–1997: Tranmere Rovers

Senior career*
Years	Team	Apps	(Gls)
1997–2002	Tranmere Rovers	140	(16)
2002–2003	Oldham Athletic	18	(1)
2003–2008	Stoke City	80	(3)
2007–2008	→ Crystal Palace (loan)	13	(3)
2008–2010	Crystal Palace	101	(2)
2010–2016	Queens Park Rangers	185	(5)
2011	→ Nottingham Forest (loan)	5	(0)
2016–2017	Rangers	24	(3)
2017–2018	Carlisle United	38	(1)
Total		588	(34)
- * Club domestic league appearances and goals

Clinton Scott Hill (born 19 October 1978) is an English former professional footballer who played as a defender. He is currently the assistant coach at Sheffield Wednesday.

Hill began his career with local side Tranmere Rovers in 1997. He broke into the first team and became a regular as Rovers reached the League Cup final in 2000. Hill was sent-off however as Tranmere lost 2–1. He remained at Prenton Park until 2002 when he joined Oldham Athletic and after impressing there he was signed by Championship side Stoke City. His first season with Stoke was cut down due to injuries which hampered his time at the club. He left for Crystal Palace after making 84 appearances for Stoke in five years.

At Palace he played well despite the club struggling financially and when manager Neil Warnock joined Queens Park Rangers Hill followed him in July 2010. In his first season at Loftus Road QPR won the Championship and gained promotion to the Premier League. They went on to ensure survival on the final day of the season, Hill winning the supporters player of the year award for his performances this despite playing 25 matches and also spending a short time on loan at Nottingham Forest.

== Playing career ==
=== Tranmere Rovers ===
Born in Huyton, Merseyside, Hill began his career as a trainee at Tranmere Rovers, where he made his debut during a 2–2 draw against Nottingham Forest in the 1997–98 season. By the 1998–99 season Hill had become a regular starter in the Tranmere side and was part of the team which played in the 2000 English League Cup Final at Wembley Stadium against Leicester City. However Hill was sent-off during the game and Tranmere lost the match 2–1. Hill made 140 appearances during his five years in the Tranmere first team.

=== Oldham Athletic ===
A£250,000 move to Oldham Athletic in 2002 saw him make just 17 league starts in one season before it was cut short when Hill broke his leg during a League Cup tie against Crystal Palace in December 2002, which kept him sidelined for the remainder of the 2002–03 season. Hill scored one league goal for the Latics, ironically against Tranmere. Hill was then given a £120,000 move to Stoke City during the summer of 2003.

=== Stoke City ===
Hill's first season at Stoke City was disrupted with injury and he was forced to sit out a lot of the 2003–04 season, making only nine first team starts and three substitute appearances. However Hill impressed during his second season at Stoke with his defensive ability and won the club's player of the year award for the 2004–05 season.

However, Hill's career at Stoke was hindered by recurring knee injuries, he damaged his anterior cruciate ligament towards the end of the 2004–05 season which prevented him from playing again until late into the 2005–06 season, however he made an immediate impact on his return, forging a strong partnership with Michael Duberry in central defence.

He found himself unable to hold down a regular first place during the 2006–07 season, with Danny Higginbotham and Michael Duberry preferred to him as first choice central defenders and Andy Griffin occupying the left-back slot. He made the majority of his appearances during the 2006–07 season as a stand-in left-back. However, Hill's season was brought to a premature end when he required a further operation on the same knee he injured in 2005.

He remained at Stoke for the first half of the following season, although he joined Crystal Palace on loan in October. Ironically, his last outing for Stoke was a late appearance as a substitute in a victory at Palace.

=== Crystal Palace ===
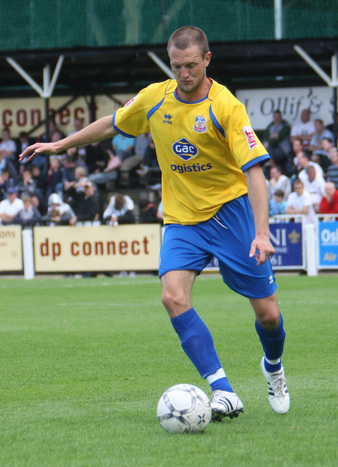
Hill playing for Crystal Palace in 2008

Hill's move to join Neil Warnock's Eagles was for an initial period of two months. After impressing hugely, he then made the move permanent for an undisclosed fee in January 2008. He established himself as first choice left back, and became a fan's favourite due to his professional and committed attitude. After an extremely successful first season at Palace, where they made the Play-off semi-finals, Hill continued his superb consistency in the 2008–09 season. Despite his performances, Palace finished in a disappointing 15th place in the Championship table. An equally disappointing season 2009–10 witnessed Palace in severe financial plight with a consequential ten points deduction and a final position in the division of 21st.

=== Queens Park Rangers ===
On 1 July 2010, Hill left Palace on a free transfer to join Queens Park Rangers and reunited with his former boss Neil Warnock. On 7 August 2010, Hill made his QPR debut in a 4–0 win over Barnsley where he got his first clean sheet. Hill scored his first goal for QPR against Portsmouth on 1 February 2011. Hill played over thirty games for the Hoops and made the left back position firmly his. He scored his second goal for QPR in a 2–0 home win against Ipswich Town, in a game where he also set up a goal for Heiðar Helguson to seal the win.

After QPR sealed the Championship title, Hill was able to play in the Premier League for the first time in his career. However, he was sent off on the opening day of the season for a headbutt on Martin Petrov of Bolton Wanderers in a 4–0 defeat at Loftus Road. On 20 September 2011, Hill signed for Nottingham Forest on a 93-day emergency loan deal, given squad number three. Due to injuries to Matthew Connolly and Danny Gabbidon, Hill was recalled early from his loan spell at Forest. Hill played for Forest five times. After his return from the loan spell, and the appointment of Mark Hughes as manager, Hill became a regular in the Rangers starting 11, forming a strong central defensive partnership with Anton Ferdinand. On 10 March 2012, Hill was denied what would have been his first Premier League goal when his header away to relegation rivals Bolton clearly crossed the line, but the linesman failed to spot this and a goal was not awarded. QPR went on to lose the game 2–1. Hill was 'gutted' about having been denied a first Premier League goal.

At the end of the 2011–12 season QPR survived on the final day of the season despite a 3–2 defeat to Manchester City. Hill was awarded both the fans and players player of the season awards for his outstanding performances for Rangers in the 2011–12 season. Hill's contract was due to expire in the summer of 2012 however Hill was keen to stay at Loftus Road. In May 2012, Hill was offered a new contract by QPR. On 19 June 2012 Clint signed a new one-year contract extension at the club until 2013.

The 2012–13 season saw Hill in and out of the starting 11 under Mark Hughes; however, he has been ever present in the team since Harry Redknapp took over as manager with Rangers in deep relegation trouble. He was handed the captaincy by Redknapp taking over from Park Ji-Sung. QPR failed to move out of the relegation zone and were relegated to the Championship after a 0–0 draw at Reading on 28 April 2013.

Hill remained captain for the 2013–14 season. He started games at both centre-back and left-back, scoring his first goal in two and a half years in the 1–0 win away to Leeds at Elland Road. He scored the winning goal once again on 2 November in a 2–1 victory over Derby County. Hill captained the team at Wembley as Rangers won the Championship Play-off final 1–0 against Derby County. Hill again signed a one-year deal to captain the club for their season back in the Premier League. On 7 April 2015 Hill scored his first Premier League goal, rising above the Aston Villa defence to head Matt Phillips' corner past Brad Guzan in the 55th minute to make the game 2–2, the final score was 3–3. After appearing 15 times in the 2015–16 season he was told his contract would not be renewed. His last game for the R's was a 1–0 win at home to Bristol City, helping the club finish 12th in their first season back in the second tier.

=== Rangers ===
On 17 June 2016, Hill joined Scottish Premiership side Rangers on a one-year deal preceding his release from Queens Park Rangers. He made his debut for the club in a League Cup match against Annan Athletic on 19 July. In doing so, Hill became the oldest debutant in the club's history, aged 37 years, 274 days. He broke a twenty-one-year-old record held by goalkeeper Billy Thomson who was aged 37 years, 50 days when he made his maiden Rangers appearance.

Hill scored his first goals for Rangers with a brace in a Scottish League Cup tie against Peterhead on 9 August 2016. He scored his first league goal for the club in a 1–1 draw with Ross County on 6 November. This goal, at the age of 38 years and 10 days, made Hill the oldest scorer in the Scottish Premiership since Lee Bullen netted at the age of 38 years and 238 days for Falkirk against Hamilton Academical in 2009. Hill was sent-off for the first time as a Rangers player, in injury time, during a league match against Aberdeen after receiving two cautions. After some solid displays for Rangers, Hill was linked to a move back to Queen's Park Rangers in December 2016, with the Loftus Road club reportedly seeking to sign him on a pre-contract agreement with a view to rejoining them on a free transfer in the summer of 2017.

Hill scored a late equaliser in the Old Firm derby against Celtic on 12 March 2017, as the match finished 1–1.

=== Carlisle United ===
Hill signed a short-term contract with Carlisle United in September 2017. In May 2018, he announced his retirement from football after leaving Carlisle United.

== Coaching career ==
On 21 May 2018, he was appointed as joint First Team Coach at Fleetwood Town alongside former Rochdale manager Steve Eyre.

Hill left Fleetwood in January 2021 when then manager Joey Barton was relieved of his duties. On 22 February, he followed Barton and Andy Mangan to join Bristol Rovers. On 14 August 2021, following a 2–0 home defeat to Stevenage, it was announced that Hill had left the club due to personal family reasons.

In October 2021, Hill was appointed assistant manager at League Two club Hartlepool United. Hill left the club a month later following the departure of manager Dave Challinor. The following day Hill followed Challinor to Stockport County in the role of assistant manager.

On 3 November 2026, Hill joined League One club Sheffield Wednesday, reuniting with manager Dave Challinor for a third time.

== Career statistics ==
Appearances and goals by club, season and competition
Club	Season	League			National Cup		League Cup		Other		Total	
Club	Season	Division	Apps	Goals	Apps	Goals	Apps	Goals	Apps	Goals	Apps	Goals
Tranmere Rovers	1997–98	First Division	14	0	3	1	0	0	—		17	1
Tranmere Rovers	1998–99	First Division	33	4	0	0	5	0	—		38	4
Tranmere Rovers	1999–2000	First Division	29	5	1	0	6	2	—		36	7
Tranmere Rovers	2000–01	First Division	34	5	3	0	6	1	—		43	6
Tranmere Rovers	2001–02	Second Division	30	2	5	0	1	0	0	0	36	2
Tranmere Rovers	Total		140	16	12	1	18	3	0	0	170	20
Oldham Athletic	2002–03	Second Division	18	1	2	0	4	0	1 (Note: Appearance in the Football League Trophy)	0	25	1
Stoke City	2003–04	First Division	12	0	0	0	0	0	—		12	0
Stoke City	2004–05	Championship	32	1	0	0	1	0	—		33	1
Stoke City	2005–06	Championship	13	0	1	0	0	0	—		14	0
Stoke City	2006–07	Championship	18	2	1	0	1	0	—		20	2
Stoke City	2007–08	Championship	5	0	0	0	0	0	—		5	0
Stoke City	Total		80	3	2	0	2	0	0	0	84	3
Crystal Palace	2007–08	Championship	28	3	1	1	0	0	2 (Note: Appearances in the Championship play-offs)	0	31	4
Crystal Palace	2008–09	Championship	43	1	3	1	2	0	—		48	2
Crystal Palace	2009–10	Championship	43	1	3	0	2	0	—		48	1
Crystal Palace	Total		114	5	7	2	4	0	2	0	127	7
Queens Park Rangers	2010–11	Championship	44	2	1	0	0	0	—		45	2
Queens Park Rangers	2011–12	Premier League	22	0	3	0	0	0	—		25	0
Queens Park Rangers	2012–13	Premier League	31	0	2	0	1	0	—		34	0
Queens Park Rangers	2013–14	Championship	40	1	1	0	2	0	3	0	46	1
Queens Park Rangers	2014–15	Premier League	19	1	0	0	1	0	—		20	1
Queens Park Rangers	2015–16	Championship	13	1	1	0	1	0	—		15	1
Queens Park Rangers	Total		169	5	8	0	5	0	3	0	185	5
Nottingham Forest (loan)	2011–12	Championship	5	0	0	0	0	0	—		5	0
Rangers	2016–17	Scottish Premiership	24	3	3	1	5	2	—		32	6
Carlisle United	2017–18	League Two	38	1	4	0	0	0	0	0	42	1
Career total			588	34	38	4	38	5	6	0	670	43

== Honours ==
Tranmere Rovers

- Football League Cup runner-up: 1999–2000

Queens Park Rangers

- Football League Championship: 2010–11; play-offs: 2014

Individual

- John Greig Achievement Award (Rangers): 2016–17
