= Dave Challinor =

English footballer and manager (born 1975)

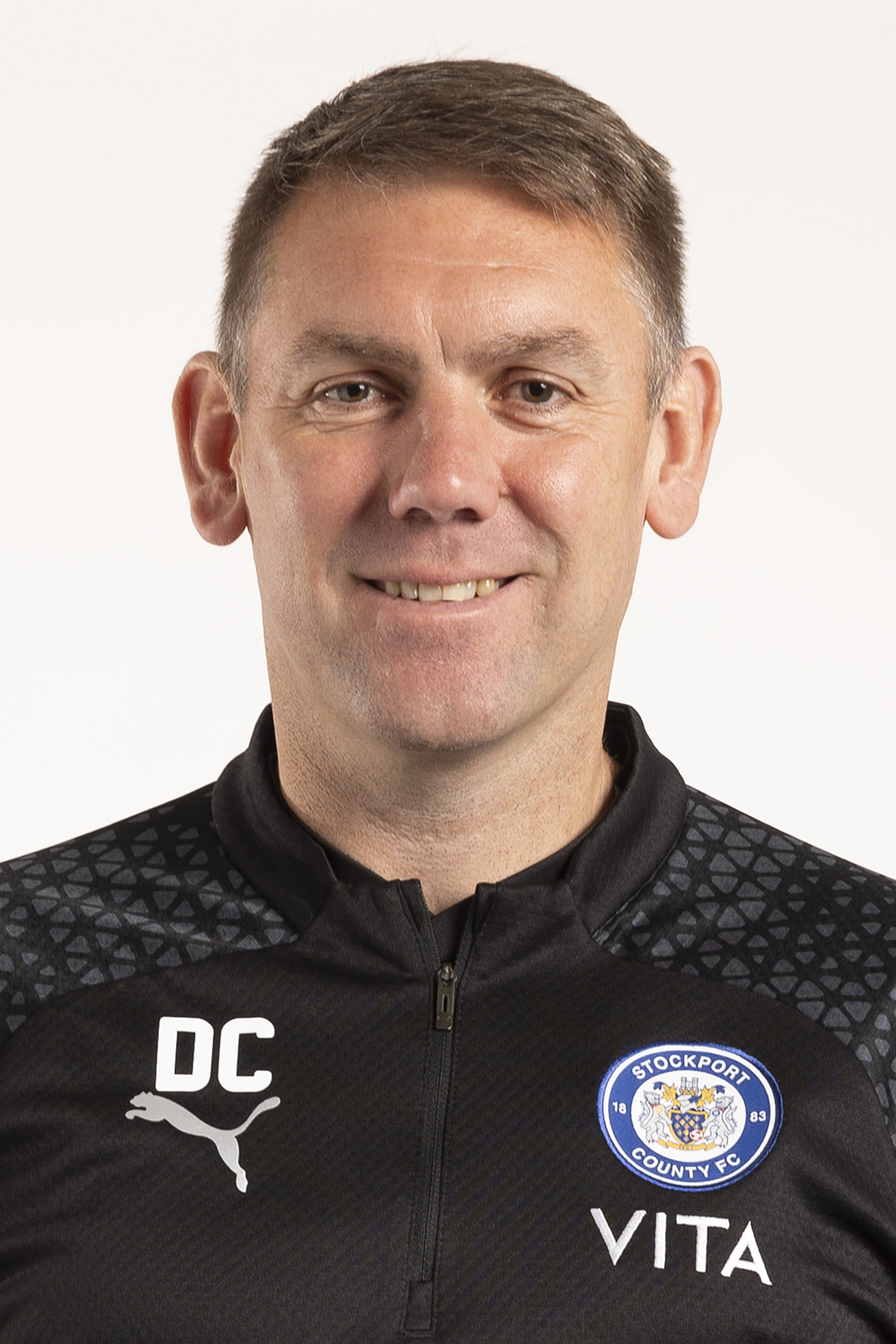
- Challinor with Stockport County

Personal information
- Full name: David Paul Challinor
- Date of birth: 2 October 1975 (age 51)
- Place of birth: Chester, Cheshire, England
- Height: 6 ft 1 in (1.85 m)
- Position: Centre-back

Team information
- Current team: Sheffield Wednesday (manager)

Senior career*
| Years | Team | Apps | (Gls) |
| 1996–2002 | Tranmere Rovers | 140 | (6) |
| 2002–2004 | Stockport County | 81 | (1) |
| 2004 | → Bury (loan) | 15 | (0) |
| 2004–2008 | Bury | 158 | (2) |
| 2008–2011 | Colwyn Bay | | |
| Total | | 394 | (9) |

Managerial career
- 2010–2011: Colwyn Bay
- 2011–2019: AFC Fylde
- 2019–2021: Hartlepool United
- 2021–2026: Stockport County
- 2026–: Sheffield Wednesday
- * Club domestic league appearances and goals

David Paul Challinor (born 2 October 1975) is an English professional football manager and former player who is the current manager of EFL League One club Sheffield Wednesday.

As a player he was as a centre-back and played in the Football League for Tranmere Rovers, Stockport County and Bury. Challinor started his managerial career at Colwyn Bay as player-manager before joining AFC Fylde. In nearly eight years, Challinor won three promotions with the club and won the FA Trophy before departing in 2019. He then joined Hartlepool United where he won promotion to the Football League via the play-offs in his first full season. Mid-way through the following season, Challinor departed for National League side Stockport County. At the end of the season, Challinor won the National League title to return to the Football League. In their first season back in the EFL, Stockport reached the 2023 play-off final but lost on penalties. In the following season, Stockport won the League Two title. After back-to-back playoff defeats in League One, Challinor left Stockport at the end of the 2025–26 season. He returned to management with League One side Sheffield Wednesday.

== Playing career ==
The centre-back, who played for Tranmere Rovers and Stockport County, previously held the world record for the longest throw in football. This was 152 feet (46.34 metres) in a special challenge set-up at Prenton Park in 1998, beating the previous record held by Cardiff City's Andy Legg. When at Tranmere, he played in the 2000 Football League Cup final.

He was transferred to Stockport County for a fee of £900,000 in January 2002. Whilst playing for Stockport County against Grimsby Town, Challinor's tackle on striker Martin Pringle broke the leg of Pringle in two places, and effectively ended his career. Though Challinor only received a yellow card, Carlton Palmer, Stockport's player-manager, subbed him immediately and fined Challinor two weeks' wages and called the tackle "horrendous".

Challinor joined Bury on loan for three months in January 2004, a move made permanent during the summer. After spending four seasons at Bury as captain, he was forced to retire from professional football in May 2008 due to a knee injury.

In October 2008, Challinor joined Colwyn Bay in the Northern Premier League Division One North, he captained the side to the play-offs in his first season where they lost out to Newcastle Blue Star on penalties. The following season the team, again captained by Challinor reached the play-offs and this time were promoted thanks to a 1–0 victory at Lancaster City in the final.

== Managerial career ==
=== Colwyn Bay ===
Challinor was appointed as player-manager at Northern Premier League Premier Division club Colwyn Bay on 28 May 2010.

He was assisted by former teammate Colin Woodthorpe. During their first season in management, they led Colwyn Bay to runners-up in the Northern Premier League Premier Division and a place in the play-offs. Victories over North Ferriby United and FC United of Manchester secured the club promotion to the Conference North. The club also won the North Wales Coast Cup, with victory over Flint Town United in the final on penalties. The club won the Fair Play Award for the fewest disciplinary points through the season and Challinor was named manager of the month for March, April and May 2011.

=== AFC Fylde ===
On 2 November 2011 it was announced that Challinor had been appointed the new manager of AFC Fylde, in the Northern Premier League Division One North. He guided Fylde to the NPL First Division North championship in the season of his arrival and as a consequence was named Evo-Stik NPL Manager of the Year 2011–12.

In 2012–13, Fylde once again qualified for the Evo-Stik NPL Premier Division play offs but were defeated on penalties by Hednesford Town who took their place in the Conference North. Fylde did qualify for the FA Cup first round proper, eventually being defeated by Accrington Stanley and also were victorious in the Lancashire FA Challenge Trophy at The Reebok Stadium, Bolton.

The 2013–14 season saw Fylde gain promotion to the National League North after defeating Ashton United in the Evo-Stik NPL Premier Division play offs. They also retained their Lancashire FA Challenge Trophy with a 4–1 victory over rivals Chorley. In addition, they won the Doodson Sport League Cup with victory at Edgeley Park over Skelmersdale United. Their disciplinary record meant they won the Fair Play Award for the Premier Division and their overall record throughout the three leagues came out on top which saw them claim the Presidents Cup. They also had the best technical area marks for the Evo-Stik league to match the previous year's statistic. The year saw Fylde move to their highest rung of the pyramid and a fourth promotion in five years for Challinor.

In 2016–17 Challinor clinched promotion as National League North champions, with a 3–0 victory over Boston United on 22 April 2017. In June 2017, he signed a new two-year contract with the club. In Fylde's debut National League campaign, the club reached the play-offs but lost 2–1 to Boreham Wood.

The 2018–19 season saw Fylde reach both the play-off final and FA Trophy final. Having been defeated 3–0 by Salford City in the play-off final, Fylde returned to Wembley Stadium the following week to beat Leyton Orient 1–0 and lift the FA Trophy for the first time in the club's history.

On 12 October 2019, after spending eight years as manager, Fylde announced that it was parting company with him as the manager, with the side in the relegation places on goal difference.

=== Hartlepool United ===
On 11 November 2019, Challinor was appointed manager of National League side Hartlepool United with the club in 13th place. In his first full season in charge, Challinor guided Hartlepool to a 4th placed finish and a place in the 2020–21 National League play-offs. In the play-off eliminator, Hartlepool defeated Bromley 3–2, scoring three goals in seven first-half minutes before Bromley scored two in the second half, ultimately proving to not be enough. In the semi-final, they travelled to Stockport County where Rhys Oates scored with fifteen minutes left to book Hartlepool's place in the final. On 20 June 2021, Hartlepool faced Torquay United in the 2021 National League play-off final at Ashton Gate Stadium. After Luke Armstrong gave Hartlepool the lead in the first half, Torquay goalkeeper Lucas Covolan scored a last minute equaliser to take the match to extra-time. Despite both sides missing their first two penalties, Hartlepool eventually won the shootout 5–4, returning to the Football League for the first time since their relegation in 2017.

On 24 September 2021, Challinor signed a new three-year contract to remain as manager. On 1 November 2021, Challinor announced his intentions to step down from the position. In a club statement, Hartlepool stated their dissatisfaction with the way Challinor departed the club: "As a club, we were disappointed the first approach did not come direct to the club. Also that this was so soon after Dave signed a new three-year contract." In an interview with Stockport County following his arrival, Challinor said that "It's been ridiculously difficult (to leave Hartlepool), once the interest came in (from Stockport) there was always going to be an attraction but the affinity I built up with the fan base there was amazing and that was the biggest tie that I had to get over".

=== Stockport County ===
On 2 November 2021, Challinor was appointed manager of National League side Stockport County with the club in 9th position, ten points from 1st place. Challinor was awarded the National League's Manager of the Month award for January 2022 after six wins from six in all competitions that saw Stockport finish the month top of the league. He would lose only one of his first 23 matches with Stockport. On 15 May 2022, Stockport beat FC Halifax Town 2–0 to clinch the National League title. Following promotion, Challinor was named as the National League Manager of the Season.

After Stockport won all three games in December 2022, Challinor won the EFL League Two Manager of the Month award. He also won the Manager of the Month award for February 2023 after winning five games from six. Stockport missed out on automatic promotion to EFL League One on the final day of the season, finishing 4th and qualifying for the play-offs. After defeating Salford City in the semi-final, Stockport lost on penalties in the play-off final to Carlisle United. On 5 July 2023, Challinor signed a new three-year deal with Stockport.

In August 2023, rumours emerged that Challinor had been interviewed for the vacant manager's job at League One club Charlton Athletic. Having remained at Stockport, he received two successive Manager of the Month awards, for September and October, extending a club-record winning run to twelve matches. At the end of the 2023–24 season, Stockport were promoted to League One as champions. This was their first Football League division title since 1966–67.

On 1 June 2026, after Stockport were defeated by Bolton in the League One playoff final, the club announced Challinor had left by mutual consent.

=== Sheffield Wednesday ===
On 1 November 2026, it was confirmed that Challinor had reached an agreement the previous evening to become the new manager of Sheffield Wednesday and he was be formally announced the following day. On 3 November, Challinor was officially unveilled as manager, signing a contract until 2030, bringing with him Clint Hill and Antony Sweeney. His first game was a 1–2 defeat to Oldham Athletic in the FA Cup, saying that the performance was "nothing like a team I want to look like." His first victory as Wednesday manager came in his first league game, a 3–0 victory against Plymouth Argyle at Hillsborough Stadium.

== Personal life ==
He studied at Salford University training to be a physiotherapist and in July 2012 graduated with a First Class Honours degree.

== Career statistics ==
As of match played 1 March 2008

Appearances and goals by club, season and competition
| Club | Season | League | | | FA Cup | | EFL Cup | | Other | | Total | |
| Club | Season | Division | Apps | Goals | Apps | Goals | Apps | Goals | Apps | Goals | Apps | Goals |
|---|---|---|---|---|---|---|---|---|---|---|---|---|
| Tranmere Rovers | 1996–97 | First Division | 5 | 0 | 0 | 0 | 0 | 0 | — | | 5 | 0 |
| Tranmere Rovers | 1997–98 | First Division | 32 | 1 | 3 | 0 | 2 | 0 | — | | 37 | 1 |
| Tranmere Rovers | 1998–99 | First Division | 34 | 2 | 1 | 0 | 2 | 0 | — | | 37 | 2 |
| Tranmere Rovers | 1999–2000 | First Division | 41 | 3 | 4 | 0 | 8 | 0 | — | | 53 | 3 |
| Tranmere Rovers | 2000–01 | First Division | 22 | 0 | 3 | 0 | 5 | 0 | — | | 30 | 0 |
| Tranmere Rovers | 2001–02 | Second Division | 6 | 0 | 0 | 0 | 1 | 0 | 1 (Note: Appearances in Football League Trophy) | 0 | 8 | 0 |
| Tranmere Rovers | Total | | 140 | 6 | 11 | 0 | 18 | 0 | 1 | 0 | 170 | 6 |
| Stockport County | 2001–02 | First Division | 18 | 0 | — | | — | | — | | 18 | 0 |
| Stockport County | 2002–03 | Second Division | 46 | 1 | 1 | 0 | 2 | 0 | 2 | 0 | 51 | 1 |
| Stockport County | 2003–04 | Second Division | 17 | 0 | 1 | 0 | 1 | 0 | 3 | 0 | 22 | 0 |
| Stockport County | Total | | 81 | 1 | 2 | 0 | 3 | 0 | 5 | 0 | 91 | 1 |
| Bury (loan) | 2003–04 | Third Division | 15 | 0 | — | | — | | 0 | 0 | 15 | 0 |
| Bury | 2004–05 | League Two | 43 | 1 | 1 | 1 | 1 | 1 | 1 | 0 | 46 | 3 |
| Bury | 2005–06 | League Two | 46 | 1 | 2 | 0 | 1 | 0 | 0 | 0 | 49 | 1 |
| Bury | 2006–07 | League Two | 43 | 0 | 4 | 0 | 1 | 0 | 1 | 0 | 49 | 0 |
| Bury | 2007–08 | League Two | 26 | 0 | 2 | 0 | 1 | 0 | 3 | 0 | 32 | 0 |
| Bury | Total | | 158 | 2 | 9 | 1 | 4 | 1 | 5 | 0 | 176 | 4 |
| Career total | | | 394 | 9 | 22 | 1 | 25 | 1 | 11 | 0 | 452 | 11 |

== Managerial statistics ==
As of 20 November 2026

Managerial record by team and tenure
| Team | From | To | Record | | | | | Ref. |
| Team | From | To | P | W | D | L | Win % | Ref. |
|---|---|---|---|---|---|---|---|---|
| Colwyn Bay | 28 May 2010 | 2 November 2011 | 66 | 34 | 12 | 20 | 51.5 | |
| AFC Fylde | 2 November 2011 | 12 October 2019 | 415 | 226 | 93 | 96 | 54.5 | |
| Hartlepool United | 11 November 2019 | 1 November 2021 | 90 | 41 | 24 | 25 | 45.6 | |
| Stockport County | 2 November 2021 | 1 June 2026 | 268 | 144 | 61 | 63 | 53.7 | |
| Sheffield Wednesday | 3 November 2026 | Present | 4 | 2 | 0 | 2 | 50.0 | |
| Total | | | 843 | 447 | 190 | 206 | 53.0 | |

== Honours ==
=== Player ===
Tranmere Rovers

- Football League Cup runner-up: 1999–2000

Colwyn Bay

- Northern Premier League Division One North play-offs: 2010

=== Manager ===
Colwyn Bay

- Northern Premier League Premier Division play-offs: 2011

AFC Fylde

- National League North: 2016–17
- Northern Premier League Premier Division play-offs: 2014
- Northern Premier League Division One North: 2011–12
- FA Trophy: 2018–19

Hartlepool United

- National League play-offs: 2021

Stockport County

- EFL League Two: 2023–24
- National League: 2021–22
- EFL Trophy runner-up: 2025–26

Individual

- Evo-Stik NPL Manager of the Year: 2011–12
- National League North Manager of the Month: September 2014
- National League North Manager of the Season: 2016–17
- National League Manager of the Month: January 2022
- National League Manager of the Season: 2021–22
- EFL League Two Manager of the Month: December 2022, February 2023, September 2023, October 2023
- LMA League Two Manager of the Year: 2023–24
- EFL League One Manager of the Month: October 2025
