= Chris Killen =

New Zealand footballer (born 1981)

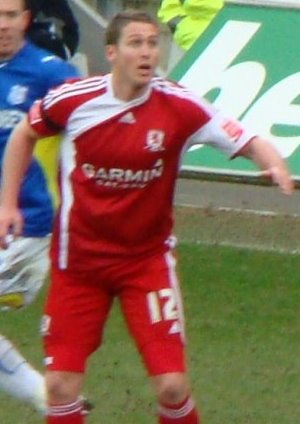
- Chris Killen playing for Middlesbrough

Personal information
- Full name: Christopher John Killen
- Date of birth: 8 October 1981 (age 45)
- Place of birth: Wellington, New Zealand
- Height: 1.80 m (5 ft 11 in)
- Position: Striker

Youth career
- Rongotai College
- 1995–1998: Miramar Rangers
- 1998–1999: Manchester City

Senior career*
Years	Team	Apps	(Gls)
1999–2002	Manchester City	3	(0)
2000	→ Wrexham (loan)	12	(3)
2001	→ Port Vale (loan)	9	(6)
2002–2006	Oldham Athletic	78	(17)
2006–2007	Hibernian	25	(16)
2007–2010	Celtic	26	(2)
2009	→ Norwich City (loan)	4	(0)
2010	Middlesbrough	17	(3)
2010–2011	Shenzhen Ruby	35	(17)
2012–2013	Chongqing	46	(23)
Total		255	(87)

International career
	New Zealand U20	4	(2)
2008	New Zealand Olympic (O.P.)	5	(1)
2001–2013	New Zealand	48	(16)
- * Club domestic league appearances and goals

Christopher John Killen (born 8 October 1981) is a New Zealand international former footballer. Killen grew up in Wellington and played club football for Miramar Rangers. After a trial with Manchester City, he joined City's youth academy. His first senior club appearances came during a loan spell at Wrexham in September 2000, and the following season he was loaned to Port Vale. Killen joined Oldham Athletic in July 2002 for £250,000, but failed to match his price tag because of persistent injury, and was eventually released on a free transfer.

In January 2006, Killen joined Hibernian and scored 11 goals in the early part of the 2006–07 season, but a ruptured Achilles tendon prematurely ended his season in January. Killen's contract with Hibernian expired in the summer of 2007, and, after using the Easter Road club's facilities to regain fitness, he then signed for Celtic on a three-year contract, but found first-team opportunities hard to come by, and was loaned to Norwich City during the 2008–09 season. Killen rejoined his former Celtic manager Gordon Strachan at Middlesbrough in January 2010. Seven months later, he moved to China to play for Shenzhen Ruby. He switched clubs to Chongqing in February 2012.

Killen made his international debut for New Zealand during the 2000 OFC Nations Cup, and was included in the New Zealand U23 squad for their appearance at the 2008 Summer Olympics as one of three over-age players. He was also named as part of the New Zealand squad for the 2002 OFC Nations Cup, 2003 and 2009 FIFA Confederations Cup, and the 2010 FIFA World Cup.

== Club career ==
=== Early career ===
Born in Wellington, Killen grew up in the Wellington suburb of Island Bay. As a youth he attended Rongotai College. He represented the college in junior grades and was selected to tour Australia with the New Zealand Secondary Schools representative team in 1998, along with future "All Whites" Leo Bertos and Tony Lochhead.

Killen played his club football for Miramar Rangers, whose coach arranged a trial with Manchester City. The trial was successful. The 17-year-old Killen joined City's youth academy. His first senior club appearances came during a loan spell at Second Division side Wrexham in September 2000, then managed by Brian Flynn. He scored his first league goal on 9 September against Oldham Athletic, and in total scored three goals in nine appearances for the Welsh club. The following season, he was loaned to Brian Horton's Second Division Port Vale. He scored on his debut on 25 September, in a 3–1 win over former club Wrexham at the Racecourse Ground. He scored in a 3–1 defeat at Wycombe Wanderers four days later, before scoring a brace in a 5–0 win over Cambridge United on his home debut at Vale Park on 5 October. He ended his loan tally with six goals in nine league games for the "Valiants". In November 2001, he was recalled from his loan by manager Kevin Keegan as a number of Manchester City strikers were injured, and played as a substitute in a 2–1 First Division win against Rotherham United. He made two further substitute appearances that season, and finished as top goalscorer for the reserves.

=== Oldham Athletic ===
He joined Oldham Athletic in July 2002, after manager Iain Dowie spent £250,000 to acquire the young striker. He scored just four goals in 33 appearances in 2002–03. During the 2003–04 campaign, he featured 13 times, scoring two goals.

Killen was the club's top scorer in the 2004–05 season, with 15 goals in 30 starts. Killen was "jinxed" by injury, however, and after a further twelve appearances in 2005–06, Oldham allowed him to move to Hibernian on a free transfer. After Killen had left the club, recently appointed manager Ronnie Moore claimed that Killen had "underachieved" during his time with the club. The club's managing director also issued a statement on the club website stating that Killen had cost £13,000 per game and £36,000 per goal due to his injury record and expensive contract.

=== Hibernian ===
In January 2006, Killen joined Hibernian (Hibs) on a free transfer. He made his debut against Hearts on 28 January, and then scored on his second appearance as he netted the third goal in Hibs' 3–0 defeat of Rangers at Ibrox in the Scottish Cup fourth round on 4 February. Four days later he scored his first goal at Easter Road, the opener in a 7–0 win over Livingston. He scored five goals for Hibs by the end of the 2005–06 season.

Killen scored the opening goal in a 5–0 win over Latvian club Dinaburg in the UEFA Intertoto Cup second-round game at Easter Road on 2 July 2006. Following the departure of strikers Garry O'Connor and Derek Riordan, Killen was expected to be an important player for Hibs in the 2006–07 season. By December 2006, he had scored 11 goals, including two in a 2–1 win over Rangers. During a 2–2 Scottish Cup draw with Aberdeen in January, however, Killen suffered a ruptured Achilles tendon which ended his season. Killen's contract with Hibernian expired in the summer of 2007 and he rejected the offer of a one-year extension from the Edinburgh club.

=== Celtic ===
Killen was expected to sign for Cardiff City, but he instead signed for Celtic on a three-year contract in May 2007. Killen made his debut on 5 August, coming off the bench in a goalless draw against Kilmarnock at Celtic Park. His first goal for the club came on 7 October at Fir Park; with Celtic trailing 1–0 to Gretna, Killen equalised in the 89th minute before Scott McDonald scored the winner for Celtic in stoppage time. He made his UEFA Champions League debut on 3 October in a shock 2–1 victory over AC Milan at Celtic Park. He made just three league starts in 2007–08, though came off the bench 24 times.

After that, however, he found chances hard to come by as he found himself behind Scott McDonald, Georgios Samaras and Jan Vennegoor of Hesselink in the pecking order. Killen played mostly for the Celtic reserve team and hardly featured in the first team. On 31 January 2009, Killen joined Championship side Norwich City on loan for the remainder of the 2008–09 season. He made his first appearance for Bryan Gunn's "Canaries" in a 3–3 draw to Wolverhampton Wanderers at Molineux on 3 February, before he returned to training with Celtic after only making four substitute appearances at Carrow Road. At the end of the 2008–09 season, manager Gordon Strachan resigned and was replaced by Tony Mowbray, who had previously managed Killen at Hibernian.

Killen's hopes of regaining a first-team place at Celtic for the 2009–10 season were boosted in pre-season friendly matches, as he scored two goals against Brisbane Roar and came off the bench to score in a 5–0 win against Al-Ahly. Killen then started Celtic's following pre-season match against Tottenham Hotspur, and he opened the scoring in this match with a neat headed finish following a pinpoint cross by teammate Paul Caddis. A further goal against Manchester City ensured he finished pre-season with five goals in five games. He scored his first league goal at Celtic Park on 20 September, Celtic's first goal in a 2–1 win against Hearts. Three days later he scored against Falkirk at Falkirk Stadium in a 4–0 win in the League Cup.

=== Middlesbrough ===
Killen returned to England in January 2010 and joined his former Celtic manager Gordon Strachan at Middlesbrough, along with teammates Willo Flood and Barry Robson. He scored his first goal at the Riverside Stadium on 9 February, in a 2–1 win over Barnsley. He scored two further headed goals in Championship games against Reading and Preston North End, but left the club after the end of the season when his contract expired in June 2010.

=== China ===
After being released by Middlesbrough, Killen signed a year and half contract with Chinese Super League side Shenzhen Ruby in July 2010, then managed by Siniša Gogić. Killen scored his first goal for the "Youth Army" on his debut against Liaoning Whowin at the Tiexi New District Sports Center on 28 July 2010. He finished his first half-year at Shenzhen Stadium with eight goals from 13 matches to help the club to avoid relegation by a two-point margin. The club were relegated in 2011 after finishing bottom of the league under Philippe Troussier, despite Killen's nine goals.

Killen signed a contract with China League One club Chongqing on 17 February 2012; the club play at the 58,680 capacity Chongqing Olympic Sports Center. He finished the 2012 season as division's fourth highest scorer on 17 goals from 26 starts.

== International career ==
Killen has represented New Zealand at under-20 and under-23 levels, and was included in the New Zealand under-23 squad for their first appearance at the Olympic Games as one of three over age players, alongside Ryan Nelsen and Simon Elliott.

Killen made his international debut for the New Zealand senior team during the 2000 OFC Nations Cup against Tahiti, three months before his first senior appearance at club level. The "All Whites" finished the tournament as runners-up after losing 2–0 to Australia in the final. He was also in the squad for the 2002 OFC Nations Cup, which New Zealand won after beating Australia 1–0 at the Mount Smart Stadium. He was further named in the 2003 FIFA Confederations Cup and featured in the defeats to Japan and Colombia at the group stage.

Killen featured in New Zealand's success at the 2008 OFC Nations Cup, though he played just one game – the 2–0 win over Fiji at Churchill Park. He was named as part of the 2009 FIFA Confederations Cup New Zealand squad to travel to South Africa. Killen scored twice in their final warm up game, a 4–3 defeat by World champions Italy. In the tournament itself, he played in the defeats to Spain and South Africa, and the draw with Iraq.

Killen also featured in the team that beat Bahrain in a two-legged Asia/Oceania play-off to qualify for the 2010 FIFA World Cup and was named in the New Zealand squad for the finals in South Africa, where New Zealand went unbeaten with three draws against Slovakia, Italy, and Paraguay; Killen played all three games.

== Personal life ==
Following his retirement from football in December 2013, Killen launched and became director of Pro Sports Financial Ltd, a financial concierge designed for male and female athletes regarding insurance policies.

In September 2016, Killen admitted to sexually assaulting a young woman in England. After first denying the charge, Killen changed his plea to guilty before he was due to go on trial. Killen received a 12-month jail term but it was suspended for 18 months, he was also ordered to undergo 20 hours of rehabilitation and to perform 200 hours of community service.

== Career statistics ==
=== Club statistics ===
Appearances and goals by club, season and competition
Club	Season	League			National cup (Note: Includes FA Cup, Scottish Cup, Chinese FA Cup)		League cup (Note: Includes Football League Cup, Scottish League Cup)		Other		Total	
Club	Season	Division	Apps	Goals	Apps	Goals	Apps	Goals	Apps	Goals	Apps	Goals
Manchester City	1999–2000	First Division	0	0	0	0	0	0	0	0	0	0
Manchester City	2000–01	Premier League	0	0	0	0	0	0	0	0	0	0
Manchester City	2001–02	First Division	3	0	0	0	0	0	0	0	3	0
Manchester City	Total		3	0	0	0	0	0	0	0	3	0
Wrexham (loan)	2000–01	Second Division	12	3	0	0	0	0	0	0	12	3
Port Vale (loan)	2001–02	Second Division	9	6	0	0	—		1	0	10	6
Oldham Athletic	2002–03	Second Division	27	3	3	0	3	1	0	0	33	4
Oldham Athletic	2003–04	Second Division	13	2	0	0	0	0	0	0	13	2
Oldham Athletic	2004–05	League One	26	10	2	4	2	0	0	0	30	14
Oldham Athletic	2005–06	League One	12	2	0	0	0	0	0	0	12	2
Oldham Athletic	Total		78	17	5	4	5	1	0	0	88	22
Hibernian	2005–06	SPL	7	3	1	1	—		0	0	8	4
Hibernian	2006–07	SPL	18	13	1	1	2	0	3 (Note: Appearance(s) in the UEFA Intertoto Cup.)	1	24	15
Hibernian	Total		25	16	2	2	2	0	3	1	32	19
Celtic	2007–08	SPL	20	1	1	0	1	0	5 (Note: Appearance(s) in the UEFA Champions League.)	0	27	1
Celtic	2008–09	SPL	1	0	0	0	0	0	0	0	1	0
Celtic	2009–10	SPL	5	1	0	0	2	1	1 (Note: Appearance(s) in the UEFA Europa League.)	0	8	2
Celtic	Total		26	2	1	0	3	1	6	0	36	3
Norwich City (loan)	2008–09	Championship	4	0	—		—		—		4	0
Middlesbrough	2009–10	Championship	17	3	—		—		—		17	3
Shenzhen Ruby	2010	Chinese Super League	14	8								
Shenzhen Ruby	2011	Chinese Super League	21	9								
Shenzhen Ruby	Total		35	17								
Chongqing	2012	China League One	26	17								
Chongqing	2013	China League One	20	6								
Chongqing	Total		46	23								
Career total			255	87	8	6	10	2	10	1	283	96

=== International statistics ===
Appearances and goals by national team and year
National team	Year	Apps	Goals
New Zealand	2000	6	2
New Zealand	2001	3	0
New Zealand	2002	4	5
New Zealand	2003	3	0
New Zealand	2006	4	1
New Zealand	2007	1	0
New Zealand	2009	8	2
New Zealand	2010	7	1
New Zealand	2011	3	0
New Zealand	2012	7	3
New Zealand	2013	2	2
Total		48	16

Scores and results list New Zealand's goal tally first, score column indicates score after each Killen goal.

List of international goals scored by Chris Killen
No.	Date	Venue	Opponent	Score	Result	Competition	Ref.
1	21 June 2000	Stade Pater, Papeete, Tahiti	Vanuatu	1–1	3–1	2000 OFC Nations Cup	
2	21 June 2000	Stade Pater, Papeete, Tahiti	Vanuatu	3–1	3–1	2000 OFC Nations Cup	
3	7 July 2002	North Harbour Stadium, North Shore, New Zealand	Papua New Guinea	1–0	9–1	2002 OFC Nations Cup	
4	7 July 2002	North Harbour Stadium, North Shore, New Zealand	Papua New Guinea	2–0	9–1	2002 OFC Nations Cup	
5	7 July 2002	North Harbour Stadium, North Shore, New Zealand	Papua New Guinea	4–0	9–1	2002 OFC Nations Cup	
6	7 July 2002	North Harbour Stadium, North Shore, New Zealand	Papua New Guinea	5–1	9–1	2002 OFC Nations Cup	
7	12 July 2002	Mount Smart Stadium, Auckland, New Zealand	Vanuatu	2–0	3–0	2002 OFC Nations Cup	
8	27 May 2006	Altenkirchen, Germany	Georgia	2–0	3–1	Friendly	
9	10 June 2009	Lucas Moripe Stadium, Atteridgeville, South Africa	Italy	2–1	3–4	Friendly	
10	10 June 2009	Lucas Moripe Stadium, Atteridgeville, South Africa	Italy	3–2	3–4	Friendly	
11	24 May 2010	Melbourne Cricket Ground, Melbourne, Australia	Australia	1–0	1–2	Friendly	
12	29 February 2012	Mount Smart Stadium, Auckland, New Zealand	Jamaica	2–3	2–3	Friendly	
13	11 September 2012	North Harbour Stadium, North Shore, New Zealand	Solomon Islands	3–1	6–1	2014 FIFA World Cup qualification	
14	16 October 2012	Rugby League Park, Christchurch, New Zealand	Tahiti	2–0	3–0	2014 FIFA World Cup qualification	
15	22 March 2013	Forsyth Barr Stadium, Dunedin, New Zealand	New Caledonia	1–0	2–1	2014 FIFA World Cup qualification	
16	5 September 2013	King Fahd International Stadium, Riyadh, Saudi Arabia	Saudi Arabia	1–0	1–0	Friendly	

== Honours ==
New Zealand

- OFC Nations Cup: 2002, 2008; runner-up: 2004; third place: 2012

Celtic

- Scottish Premier League: 2007–08
