= Dean Holden =

English footballer (born 1979)

- Holden in 2026

Personal information
- Full name: Dean Thomas John Holden
- Date of birth: 15 September 1979 (age 47)
- Place of birth: Swinton, England
- Height: 6 ft 1 in (1.85 m)
- Position: Defender

Team information
- Current team: Hull City (assistant manager)

Senior career*
| Years | Team | Apps | (Gls) |
| 1998–2002 | Bolton Wanderers | 13 | (1) |
| 2001 | → Valur (loan) | 7 | (0) |
| 2001–2002 | → Oldham Athletic (loan) | 23 | (2) |
| 2002–2005 | Oldham Athletic | 85 | (8) |
| 2005–2007 | Peterborough United | 56 | (4) |
| 2007–2009 | Falkirk | 48 | (2) |
| 2009–2011 | Shrewsbury Town | 50 | (0) |
| 2010 | → Rotherham United (loan) | 6 | (0) |
| 2011–2012 | Chesterfield | 31 | (3) |
| 2011–2012 | → Rochdale (loan) | 7 | (0) |
| 2012 | Rochdale | 14 | (0) |
| 2012–2014 | Walsall | 29 | (2) |
| Total | | 369 | (22) |

Managerial career
- 2015: Oldham Athletic
- 2020–2021: Bristol City
- 2022: Stoke City (caretaker)
- 2022–2023: Charlton Athletic
- * Club domestic league appearances and goals

Dean Thomas John Holden (born 15 September 1979) is an English professional football manager and former player who is assistant head coach of Premier League club Hull City.

A defender who was comfortable playing at right-back and centre-back, his career began at Bolton Wanderers in 1998 and ended with a stint at Walsall from 2012 to 2014. Over that sixteen-year period, Holden represented ten clubs, amassing 369 appearances and scoring 22 goals.

He moved in to coaching with Oldham Athletic in November 2014 and spent time as manager from February until May 2015. Holden joined Bristol City in November 2016 as assistant manager to Lee Johnson. Following Johnson's departure on 4 July 2020, Holden was placed in caretaker charge before being given the role on a permanent basis. He was sacked by Bristol City in February 2021. In April 2021, Holden joined Stoke City as assistant manager, and was briefly Stoke's caretaker manager before joining Charlton Athletic in December 2022.

== Club career ==
Born in Swinton, Greater Manchester, Holden started his career with Bolton Wanderers where he made 13 league appearances and scored once against Sheffield United, before moving on to Oldham Athletic after a successful loan period.

After over 100 first-team appearances for Oldham he joined Peterborough United in 2005. He was made captain but, with his contract close to expiry, he was transferred to Falkirk on 1 January 2007 for an undisclosed fee.

On 27 January 2008, Holden suffered a broken leg, after a late tackle by Celtic's Stephen McManus, during Falkirk's 1–0 home defeat, leaving him out of action until October.

Holden signed a two-year contract with Shrewsbury Town on 26 June 2009. On 5 August 2010 Holden signed on loan at Rotherham United, initially for only one month but this was extended twice until he was recalled early by Shrewsbury on 20 October. On 31 January 2011, Holden had his contract cancelled by mutual agreement and he became a free agent.

Chesterfield signed Holden on 3 February 2011 in a short-term contract until the end of the season. Holden then signed a new one-year deal with Chesterfield on 18 May 2011.

On 3 November 2011, Holden joined Rochdale on loan until January 2012. In January 2012, Holden made his loan switch permanent on a six-month contract. In May 2012, Holden was released from Rochdale after being told his contract would not be renewed.

On 16 July 2012, Dean Holden signed a one-year deal at League One side Walsall.

== International career ==
Despite his English birth and having played for the England youth team, Holden qualified to represent Northern Ireland through his grandparents, and was called up to their full squad for the first time in June 2007 but did not make an appearance.

== Managerial career ==
On 14 November 2014, Holden left Walsall to join former club Oldham Athletic as first-team coach. On 17 March 2015, after a spell as caretaker manager, Holden remained manager until the end of the 2014–15 season. Holden returned to his assistant manager role following the appointment of Darren Kelly in May 2015. Holden was sacked by Oldham along with David Dunn in January 2016 after a poor run of form. He re-joined Walsall in March 2016 as first-team coach.

Holden joined Bristol City as assistant manager to Lee Johnson in November 2016. On 4 July 2020, following the dismissal of Johnson, Holden became caretaker head coach. In August 2020 Holden was appointed as full-time head coach at Bristol City, on a 12-month rolling contract, after he had won two and drawn two games of the last five of the 2019–20 season while in temporary charge. On 16 February 2021, Holden was sacked after a run of six successive defeats in all competitions and the club placed 13th in the Championship.

On 14 April 2021, Holden was appointed as assistant to Michael O'Neill at Stoke City. Following O'Neill's dismissal in August 2022, Holden was appointed as interim manager. He took charge of Stoke's 1–0 win at Blackburn Rovers two days later, before confirming his departure from the club ahead of Alex Neil's appointment as O'Neill's replacement.

On 20 December 2022, Holden was named manager of Charlton Athletic, taking over from caretaker manager Anthony Hayes on Boxing Day, 26 December 2022.

On 27 August 2023, Holden was sacked as Charlton manager after one win in the opening six games of the 2023–24 season.

In February 2024, Holden joined Saudi Arabian side Al-Ettifaq as assistant manager to Steven Gerrard

On 2 July 2025, Holden joined Hull City as assistant manager.

== Personal life ==
In June 2006, Holden married television presenter Danielle Nicholls. They live in Worsley and have four children. In 2012 their youngest child died after contracting meningococcal sepsis, while the family were on holiday in Lanzarote. Holden is a lifelong supporter of Manchester United.

== Career statistics ==
Appearances and goals by club, season and competition
| Club | Season | League | | | National Cup | | League Cup | | Other | | Total | |
| Club | Season | Division | Apps | Goals | Apps | Goals | Apps | Goals | Apps | Goals | Apps | Goals |
|---|---|---|---|---|---|---|---|---|---|---|---|---|
| Bolton Wanderers | 1999–2000 | First Division | 12 | 0 | 4 | 0 | 3 | 0 | — | | 19 | 0 |
| Bolton Wanderers | 2000–01 | First Division | 1 | 1 | 0 | 0 | 0 | 0 | — | | 1 | 1 |
| Bolton Wanderers | 2001–02 | Premier League | 0 | 0 | 0 | 0 | 1 | 0 | — | | 1 | 0 |
| Bolton Wanderers | Total | | 13 | 1 | 4 | 0 | 4 | 0 | — | | 21 | 1 |
| Valur (loan) | 2001 | Úrvalsdeild | 7 | 0 | 2 | 0 | — | | — | | 9 | 0 |
| Oldham Athletic (loan) | 2001–02 | Second Division | 23 | 2 | 1 | 0 | 0 | 0 | 3 (Note: Appearance(s) in Football League Trophy) | 0 | 28 | 2 |
| Oldham Athletic | 2002–03 | Second Division | 6 | 2 | 0 | 0 | 1 | 0 | 0 | 0 | 7 | 2 |
| Oldham Athletic | 2003–04 | Second Division | 39 | 4 | 2 | 0 | 0 | 0 | 2 | 0 | 43 | 4 |
| Oldham Athletic | 2004–05 | League One | 40 | 2 | 2 | 0 | 2 | 0 | 4 | 1 | 48 | 3 |
| Oldham Athletic | Total | | 108 | 10 | 5 | 0 | 3 | 0 | 9 | 1 | 125 | 11 |
| Peterborough United | 2005–06 | League Two | 35 | 3 | 2 | 0 | 0 | 0 | 3 | 0 | 40 | 3 |
| Peterborough United | 2006–07 | League Two | 21 | 1 | 2 | 0 | 2 | 0 | 2 | 0 | 27 | 1 |
| Peterborough United | Total | | 56 | 4 | 4 | 0 | 2 | 0 | 5 | 0 | 67 | 4 |
| Falkirk | 2006–07 | Scottish Premier League | 9 | 1 | 2 | 0 | 0 | 0 | — | | 11 | 1 |
| Falkirk | 2007–08 | Scottish Premier League | 20 | 0 | 2 | 0 | 2 | 0 | — | | 24 | 0 |
| Falkirk | 2008–09 | Scottish Premier League | 19 | 1 | 2 | 0 | 1 | 0 | — | | 22 | 1 |
| Falkirk | Total | | 48 | 2 | 6 | 0 | 3 | 0 | — | | 57 | 2 |
| Shrewsbury Town | 2009–10 | League Two | 37 | 0 | 0 | 0 | 1 | 0 | 0 | 0 | 38 | 0 |
| Shrewsbury Town | 2010–11 | League Two | 13 | 0 | 1 | 0 | 0 | 0 | 0 | 0 | 14 | 0 |
| Shrewsbury Town | Total | | 50 | 0 | 1 | 0 | 1 | 0 | 0 | 0 | 52 | 0 |
| Rotherham United (loan) | 2010–11 | League Two | 6 | 0 | 0 | 0 | 0 | 0 | 1 | 0 | 7 | 0 |
| Chesterfield | 2010–11 | League Two | 17 | 2 | 0 | 0 | 0 | 0 | 0 | 0 | 17 | 2 |
| Chesterfield | 2011–12 | League One | 14 | 1 | 0 | 0 | 1 | 0 | 1 | 0 | 16 | 1 |
| Chesterfield | Total | | 31 | 3 | 0 | 0 | 1 | 0 | 1 | 0 | 33 | 3 |
| Rochdale | 2011–12 | League One | 21 | 0 | 1 | 0 | 0 | 0 | 0 | 0 | 22 | 0 |
| Walsall | 2012–13 | League One | 25 | 2 | 2 | 0 | 2 | 0 | 0 | 0 | 29 | 2 |
| Walsall | 2013–14 | League One | 0 | 0 | 0 | 0 | 0 | 0 | 0 | 0 | 0 | 0 |
| Walsall | 2014–15 | League One | 4 | 0 | 0 | 0 | 1 | 0 | 0 | 0 | 5 | 0 |
| Walsall | Total | | 29 | 2 | 2 | 0 | 3 | 0 | 0 | 0 | 34 | 2 |
| Career total | | | 369 | 22 | 25 | 0 | 17 | 0 | 16 | 1 | 427 | 23 |

== Managerial statistics ==
As of match played 26 August 2023

Managerial record by team and tenure
| Team | From | To | Record | | | | |
| Team | From | To | P | W | D | L | Win % |
|---|---|---|---|---|---|---|---|
| Oldham Athletic | 25 February 2015 | 5 May 2015 | 15 | 3 | 5 | 7 | 20.0 |
| Bristol City | 5 July 2020 | 16 February 2021 | 43 | 19 | 5 | 19 | 44.2 |
| Stoke City (caretaker) | 26 August 2022 | 27 August 2022 | 1 | 1 | 0 | 0 | 100.0 |
| Charlton Athletic | 20 December 2022 | 27 August 2023 | 32 | 12 | 5 | 15 | 37.5 |
| Total | | | 91 | 35 | 15 | 41 | 38.5 |

== Honours ==
Chesterfield

- Football League Two: 2010–11
