= Matt O'Halloran =

English footballer (born 1982)

Personal information
- Full name: Matthew O'Halloran
- Date of birth: 18 November 1982 (age 43)
- Place of birth: Nottingham, England
- Position: Midfielder

Team information
- Current team: Lincoln United (first team coach)

Senior career*
Years	Team	Apps	(Gls)
2000–2003	Derby County	0	(0)
2002–2003	→ Burton Albion (loan)	8	(2)
2003	Oldham Athletic	17	(1)
2003–2004	Chesterfield	3	(0)
2004–2005	Boston United	10	(1)
2005–2007	King's Lynn	96	(23)
2007–2008	Boston United	27	(1)
2008–2009	Corby Town	34	(4)
2009–2010	Lincoln United	56	(16)
2010	Lincoln Moorlands Railway	21	(2)
2011	Holbeach United	4	(1)
2013–2014	Lincoln United	10	(0)
2014–2015	Sleaford Town	8	(0)
Total		294	(51)
- * Club domestic league appearances and goals as of 12 December 2007

Matthew O'Halloran (born 18 November 1982) is an English football coach and former professional footballer who is a first team coach at Lincoln United.

As a player he was a midfielder who notably played in the Football League between 2000 and 2005 for Derby County, Oldham Athletic, Chesterfield and Boston United, as well as playing non-league football for Burton Albion, King's Lynn, Corby Town, Lincoln United, Lincoln Moorlands Railway and Sleaford Town.

== Career ==
=== Professional ===
O'Halloran began his professional football career with Derby County in 2000 but after a promising start, starring for the youth team including a memorable individual goal in the FA youth cup against Aston Villa and featuring regularly for the reserves he never featured in the first team.

In late 2002 he spent over a month on loan at Burton Albion scoring the winner on debut in a 2-1 win away at Nuneaton. Grimsby Town and Hartlepool United were linked with a move for O'Halloran in May 2003 where he spent 3 weeks on trial with the club.

He signed for Oldham Athletic on a non-contract basis at the start of the 2003–04 season, which was extended for another month in September 2003 with the highlight being his last minute winner against Rushden and Diamonds in a 3-2 win. He moved on a free transfer to Chesterfield in December 2003 but after tearing his hamstring on debut he struggled to return to full fitness. He then signed for Boston United in August 2004 making his debut against Leyton Orient but was in and out of the team and apart from his stoppage time thunderbolt against Scunthorpe United in a 2-1 win he failed to make a name for himself.

=== Non-league ===
O'Halloran signed for King's Lynn in March 2005 following becoming disillusioned with professional football and became an integral part of the team that challenged for the Southern Premier league title where he was joined by former Boston United teammate Dean West. He also played a prominent role scoring important goals in the clubs FA cup run in the 2006/2007 season, culminating in their 2nd-round game being televised live on Sky Sports against his former club Oldham Athletic eventually losing 2-0. . He re-signed for Boston in August 2007 but after a positive start injuries took their toll and he underwent a double hernia operation in the latter stages of the season . He was offered a new contract by manager Tommy Taylor but instead chose to sign for Corby Town where he scored on debut in the opening game of the season. Injuries again played their part and limited his appearances in the second half of the season but he was a member of the Southern Premier league title winning side that season.

He left Corby at the end of the 2008–09 season and joined his home town club Lincoln United alongside former Boston and King's Lynn teammate Steve Melton becoming a regular on the scoresheet from midfield. In October 2010, he joined Lincoln Moorlands Railway but persistent concerns with an ongoing back injury resulting in ruptured discs continued and he was forced to retire from competitive football at the age of 28. O'Halloran came out of retirement at the start of the 2013–2014 season having rejoined Lincoln United but overcoming the injuries proved difficult and following a stint at Sleaford Town he officially retired in October 2014.
