= Wes Wilkinson =

English footballer (born 1984)

Personal information
- Full name: Wesley Wilkinson
- Date of birth: 1 May 1984 (age 42)
- Place of birth: Manchester, England
- Height: 5 ft 10 in (1.78 m)
- Position: Midfielder

Youth career
- 2000–2002: Altrincham

Senior career*
| Years | Team | Apps | (Gls) |
| 2002–2004 | Nantwich Town | | (32) |
| 2004–2005 | Oldham Athletic | 6 | (0) |
| 2005 | Woodley Sports | | |
| 2005–2006 | Leigh RMI | | |
| 2006–2007 | Ashton United | | |
| 2007 | Newcastle Town | | |
| 2007–2010 | Trafford | | |
| 2010–2011 | Irlam | | |
| 2011–2013 | New Mills | | |
| 2013–2014 | Kidsgrove Athletic | | |
- * Club domestic league appearances and goals

Wesley "Wes" Wilkinson (born 1 May 1984) is an English footballer who played as a midfielder in the Football League for Oldham Athletic.

== Career ==
Wilkinson was born in Manchester and began his career in the youth team at Altrincham. Manager Nigel Gleghorn brought him to Nantwich Town in the summer of 2002 and he was the Dabbers' top scorer for two seasons before joining Oldham Athletic in March 2004. He made six appearances in the Football League for the Latics before he was released in May 2005. After leaving Oldham, Wilkinson re-entered non-league football playing for a host of clubs in the Manchester area including Woodley Sports, Leigh RMI, Ashton United, Newcastle Town, Trafford, Irlam and New Mills. In August 2013 he joined Staffordshire club Kidsgrove Athletic.
