= James Olsen (footballer) =

English footballer

Personal information
- Full name: James Paul Olsen
- Date of birth: 23 October 1981 (age 45)
- Place of birth: Bootle, England
- Height: 5 ft 10 in (1.78 m)
- Position: Midfielder

Senior career*
Years	Team	Apps	(Gls)
2000–2004	Tranmere Rovers	4	(0)
2004	Macclesfield Town	2	(0)
2004–2005	Vauxhall Motors	36	(5)
2005	Altrincham	9	(1)
2005–2006	Vauxhall Motors	13	(1)
2006	Barrow	12	(3)
2006–2007	Southport	19	(0)
2007	Stalybridge Celtic	9	(1)
2007–2008	Colywn Bay	?	(?)
2008	Burscough	?	(?)
2008–2010	Marine	?	(?)
2010	Colwyn Bay	?	(?)
- * Club domestic league appearances and goals

James Paul Olsen (born 23 October 1981) in Liverpool, England, is an English professional footballer who played as a midfielder for Tranmere Rovers and Macclesfield Town in the Football League.
