= Danny Hall (footballer) =

English footballer (born 1983)

Personal information
- Full name: Daniel Andrew Hall
- Date of birth: 14 November 1983 (age 42)
- Place of birth: Ashton-under-Lyne, England
- Height: 6 ft 2 in (1.88 m)
- Position: Defender

Senior career*
Years	Team	Apps	(Gls)
2002–2006	Oldham Athletic	64	(1)
2003	→ Scarborough (loan)	1	(0)
2006–2008	Shrewsbury Town	42	(0)
2008	Gretna	15	(0)
2008–2010	Chesterfield	29	(3)
2009–2010	→ Darlington (loan)	2	(0)
2010–2011	Crawley Town	14	(0)
2011	→ Forest Green Rovers (loan)	17	(0)
2011	Stockport County	1	(0)
2011–2012	Hyde	32	(4)
2012–2013	Altrincham	36	(0)
2013	Celtic Nation	2	(0)
2013–2016	Guiseley	52	(3)
2015	→ Hyde (loan)	2	(0)
2015	→ Bradford Park Avenue (loan)	3	(0)
2016	Curzon Ashton	6	(1)
2016	Altrincham	4	(0)
2016–2017	Stalybridge Celtic	4	(0)
2017–2018	Droylsden		
2018	Mossley	5	(1)
- * Club domestic league appearances and goals

Daniel Andrew Hall (born 14 November 1983) is an English former professional footballer who played in the Football League for Oldham Athletic, Shrewsbury Town, Chesterfield and Darlington and in the Scottish Premier League for Gretna. He also played non-league football for Crawley Town, Forest Green Rovers, Stockport County, Hyde, Altrincham, Celtic Nation, Guiseley, Bradford Park Avenue, Curzon Ashton, Stalybridge Celtic, Droylsden and Mossley.

== Career ==
Born in Ashton-under-Lyne, Greater Manchester, he grew up in nearby Dukinfield. As a child he went to Globe Lane Primary School and Audenshaw High School.

As a young lad he played for Stalybridge Celtic, and was later picked up by the Tameside Centre of Excellence. From there he picked up a Youth Training Scheme place with the Oldham Athletic youth team, which led to him signing a professional contract with Oldham Athletic in 1999.

Rumours spread early in his career of a possible move to the Premier League with either Bolton Wanderers or Blackburn Rovers, but a string of injuries, culminating in a long period of absence due to patellar tendinitis, proved to be a frustration to his progress.

He spent one month's loan at Scarborough in 2003, only playing the first half of one game before returning to Oldham Athletic. He made a total of 78 appearances for Oldham.

He joined Shrewsbury Town on 13 May 2006. After joining Shrewsbury, Hall commented on his delight at signing for a club who are ambitious and also seem to be heading in the right direction under manager Gary Peters. Gary Peters claims to have been following the progress of Danny for around 3 years, starting during his time at Everton. At this time Hall was 19 years old and just making his step up to first team football at Oldham. Hall made his Shrewsbury debut in the 2006–07 opener against Mansfield Town, which finished 2–2. He went on to make a total of 27 league appearances over the course of the season.

On 10 January 2008 he completed a move to Scottish Premier League side Gretna until the end of the season. Hall was one of forty remaining employees made redundant by Gretna on 19 May 2008, shortly before the club was forced out of business due to financial problems.

Hall signed an initial one-year contract with Chesterfield in July 2008. Hall made thirty-two league appearances during a two-year stay at Saltergate, scoring twice. During his second season at Chesterfield, the player spent a brief period on loan at Darlington.

In May 2010, Hall opted to drop down a division to go and play for Conference National side Crawley Town. It was reported that Crawley had fought off competition from other clubs to sign him.

On 7 January 2011, Hall signed for fellow Conference National side Forest Green Rovers on a short-term loan. He was given the number 16 shirt. He made his debut the next day in a 1–0 victory over Fleetwood Town. Hall impressed in his first month at The New Lawn and Rovers extended his loan contract until April. After 17 appearances his loan spell with Forest Green expired after their home victory over Altrincham on 9 April 2011. He returned to Crawley on the same day they had secured promotion to the Football League for the first time in their history.

He joined Stockport County on an initial month deal in August 2011 but was released on 1 September after his contract had expired, having appeared just once for the club.

A day later, he joined Conference North club Hyde.

In May 2012 he joined Altrincham.

Shortly after Mark Bower took over Guiseley, he signed Hall. He was a key player for their promotion push. Covering for Danny Ellis after his injury he made a solid partnership with Adam Lockwood. In the pre-season of 2014–15 playing against Farsley he broke his leg and missed the first half of the season.

Hall joined Bradford Park Avenue on a season's loan on 21 August 2015. He subsequently joined Curzon Ashton in the summer of 2016.

In September 2016 he returned to Altrincham before leaving again in November. He then played for Stalybridge Celtic, Droylsden and Mossley, where he finished his career.

== Honours ==
Shrewsbury Town

- Football League Two play-off final runner-up: 2006–07

Chesterfield

- Banner Jones Middleton Cup winner: 2008–09
