= David Beharall =

English association football player (born 1979)

Personal information
- Full name: David Alexander Beharall
- Date of birth: 8 March 1979 (age 47)
- Place of birth: Newcastle upon Tyne, England
- Height: 6 ft 2 in (1.88 m)
- Position: Centre back

Youth career
- 1996–1998: Newcastle United

Senior career*
| Years | Team | Apps | (Gls) |
| 1998–2002 | Newcastle United | 6 | (0) |
| 2001 | → Grimsby Town (loan) | 14 | (0) |
| 2001–2002 | → Oldham Athletic (loan) | 17 | (1) |
| 2001–2005 | Oldham Athletic | 43 | (2) |
| 2005–2006 | Carlisle United | 20 | (1) |
| 2006 | Stockport County | 12 | (0) |
| Total | | 112 | (4) |
- * Club domestic league appearances and goals

David Alexander Beharall (born 8 March 1979) is an English former professional footballer who played as a defender.

Beharall started his football playing career for Newcastle United in 1996 and graduated to the first team in 1998. While at St James' Park he had loan spells at Grimsby Town and Oldham Athletic in 2001 and 2002 before joining Oldham for a fee of £150,000 in March 2002. He left Oldham in February 2005 to join Carlisle United on a free transfer and a year later in February 2006 Beharall joined Stockport County. He retired from football at the age of 27 due to a knee injury in 2006.

== Career ==
=== Newcastle United ===
Beharall started off his playing career at hometown club Newcastle United in 1996 where he graduated to the first team in 1998 after being captain to the youth and reserve teams. Beharall made his first Premier League start and his debut for Newcastle in the 3–1 loss against Everton on 17 April 1999. Beharall started another 3 Premier League games during the 1998–99 season. During the 1999–2000 season, Beharall played 2 more Premier League games; the 3–3 draw against Wimbledon and the 5–1 loss at Manchester United. The match against Manchester United turned out to be his last match for the club. After two years without a first team appearance, Beharall wanted to join Preston North End on loan after spending two days at Deepdale in early January 2001, but Preston's manager David Moyes decided against the move.

=== Grimsby Town ===
With first team opportunities running out at Newcastle, Beharall joined Grimsby Town in August 2001 originally on trial, with a view to a loan move due to Grimsby's lack of centre backs. After his trial he joined The Mariners on loan in August 2001 for 3 months and made his début in a 1–0 win against Crewe Alexandra on 11 August. David played another 15 league and cup games for Grimsby Town, including the 2–1 cup upset they inflicted on Liverpool in the League Cup 3rd round at Anfield on 9 October 2001. Beharall gave away the penalty that Liverpool midfielder Gary McAllister scored as he was judged to have handled the ball in the penalty box. That goal gave Liverpool the lead with 19 minutes left but goals from Marlon Broomes and Phil Jevons in stoppage time cancelled out Beharall's mistake and Grimsby pulled off a big cup upset. Beharall ended his loan spell in November 2001.

=== Oldham Athletic ===
Ten days after leaving Grimsby Town, Beharall was on the move again, this time to Oldham Athletic on a loan deal to the end of the season. Beharall made his dèbut in a 0–0 draw against Stoke City on 21 November 2001. He played 17 league games, two FA Cup and two Football League Trophy matches during his loan spell at Oldham, scoring one goal in the 89th minute in a 1–1 draw against Wigan Athletic on 15 December 2001. Beharall was bought by Oldham Athletic on 6 March 2002 for £150,000 on a three-year contract after impressing during his loan deal. David played one more league game for The Latics during the 2001–02 season against Wigan on 9 March, a match which Wigan won 1–0. In the 2002–03 season Beharall played 32 league, 4 League and 3 FA Cup games for Oldham under the management of Iain Dowie, who replaced Mick Wadsworth in the summer of 2002. In the pre-season of the 2003–04 season, he suffered an injury which left him out of action until October 2003. During this time in August 2003 Beharall was a victim of a carjacking when he and teammate Adam Griffin were attacked when they stopped at a cash machine with Beharall leaving Griffin in the passenger seat and his £21,000 Mercedes-Benz R230 car parked at a Texaco garage in Oldham. Griffin was left defenseless with one of the attackers holding him at knifepoint and another man hit Griffin's left arm with an iron bar, then dragging and throwing Griffin to the ground. Beharall left his wallet and mobile phone in the car but was relieved that he and Griffin were OK. During the 2003–2004 season Beharall played 7 league, 2 FA Cup and 2 Football league games, he also scored 2 league goals against Plymouth Argyle on 1 November 2003. After playing only 6 league games during the 2004–05 season new manager Brian Talbot, Beharall left the club on 24 January 2005 after agreeing a settlement figure.

=== Carlisle United ===
Nine days after leaving Oldham, Beharall joined Carlisle United, with him signing a contract until July 2006. This was the first time in his career he played for a non-league club. Beharall made his debut for the club in the 2–2 draw against Gravesend & Northfleet on 12 February 2005. In the 2004–05 season, Beharall was part of Carlisle's return to the Football League, playing 14 matches (3 of these being playoff matches) and playing 1 FA Trophy match. He scored one Conference goal, in the 2–1 win at Farnborough Town on 2 April 2005. Beharall's pre-season preparations were ruined by an injury which made him miss the start of Carlisle's season, but the MRI scan revealed he had not suffered a tear to any of the major knee ligaments. When he returned from injury in October 2005, Beharall played 6 League and 2 Football League Trophy matches. Most of these appearances came in October and November. However, with the lack of opportunities, Beharall left Carlisle by mutual consent on 1 February 2006.

=== Stockport County ===
After being released by Carlisle, Beharall decided to join League Two strugglers Stockport County until the end of the 2005–06 season, after playing well in a reserve match for County prior to his move, he had high hopes of saving the club from relegation and also hoped to impress the County manager Jim Gannon enough to earn a new contract for the following season. Beharall made his début for County in the 2–1 away victory against Chester City. Beharall played another 11 league games during the 2005–06 for Stockport and was starting contract negotiations the managed Jim Gannon, but in May 2006 Beharall retired due to an ongoing bad knee injury.

== Personal life ==
Since retiring Beharall has gone on to set up and run digital agency CandidSky based in Manchester city centre. He has won North West Entrepreneur of the year as well as an award for his work within social media. In June 2016 CandidSky won 'Best Use of Search & CRO' at the 18th annual Big Chip Awards. It is the longest-running digital industry awards in the UK.
