= 2001–02 Derby County F.C. season =

Derby County
2001–02 season
- Chairman: Lionel Pickering
- Manager: Jim Smith (until 7 October); Colin Todd (from 7 October to 14 January); John Gregory (from 30 January)
- Stadium: Pride Park Stadium
- Premiership: 19th (relegated)
- FA Cup: Third round
- League Cup: Third round
- Top goalscorer: League: Christie/Ravanelli (9); All: Ravanelli (11)
- Highest home attendance: 33,297 (vs. Everton, 23 March)
- Lowest home attendance: 11,246 (vs. Hull City, 12 September)
- Average home league attendance: 29,818

During the 2001–02 English football season, Derby County competed in the FA Premier League (known as the FA Barclaycard Premiership for sponsorship reasons).

== Season summary ==
Derby started their new season quite well with a 2–1 win over newly-promoted Blackburn Rovers. Manager Jim Smith rejected the offer to become Director of Football and resigned on 7 October after more than six years at the helm. His assistant Colin Todd, who won two league titles with the club in the 1970s, was promoted to the manager's seat, but by this stage the Rams were deep in relegation trouble. A shock 3–1 home defeat against Division Three strugglers Bristol Rovers in the FA Cup proved the final straw for the directors and Todd was sacked days later, after a mere three months in charge. By the end of the month, John Gregory had taken over at Pride Park just six days after quitting Aston Villa. Two quick wins and a draw against Manchester United (in which they had a potential late winning goal controversially ruled out) suggested that Gregory might be Derby's saviour, but seven defeats from their final eight games condemned Derby to relegation.

== Final league table ==
Pos	Team	Pld	W	D	L	GF	GA	GD	Pts	Qualification or relegation
16	Bolton Wanderers	38	9	13	16	44	62	−18	40	
17	Sunderland	38	10	10	18	29	51	−22	40	
18	Ipswich Town (R)	38	9	9	20	41	64	−23	36	UEFA Cup QR and relegation to the First Division (Note: Ipswich Town qualified for the UEFA Cup qualifying as the winners of Premiership Fair Play League by The Football Association, and as one of the UEFA Fair Play ranking winners.)
19	Derby County (R)	38	8	6	24	33	63	−30	30	Relegation to the Football League First Division
20	Leicester City (R)	38	5	13	20	30	64	−34	28	Relegation to the Football League First Division

Source: Premier League
Rules for classification: 1) points; 2) goal difference; 3) number of goals scored.
(R) Relegated
Notes:

Results summary

Overall								Home						Away					
Pld	W	D	L	GF	GA	GD	Pts	W	D	L	GF	GA	GD	W	D	L	GF	GA	GD
38	8	6	24	33	63	−30	30	5	4	10	20	26	−6	3	2	14	13	37	−24

Source: Statto

Results by round

Round	1	2	3	4	5	6	7	8	9	10	11	12	13	14	15	16	17	18	19	20	21	22	23	24	25	26	27	28	29	30	31	32	33	34	35	36	37	38
Ground	H	A	A	H	H	A	H	A	H	H	A	H	A	H	H	A	A	H	A	A	H	A	H	A	H	H	A	H	A	A	H	A	H	A	H	A	H	A
Result	W	L	D	D	L	L	L	L	D	D	L	W	L	L	W	L	L	W	L	W	L	L	L	L	W	L	W	D	L	W	L	L	L	L	L	L	L	D
Position	4	9	9	10	13	18	19	18	18	18	20	17	18	19	18	18	18	18	18	18	18	19	19	19	19	19	19	19	19	19	19	19	19	19	19	19	19	19

Source: Statto.com
A = Away; H = Home; W = Win; D = Draw; L = Loss

== Results ==
Derby County's score comes first

=== Legend ===
Win	Draw	Loss

=== FA Premier League ===
Date	Opponent	Venue	Result	Attendance	Scorers
18 August 2001	Blackburn Rovers	H	2–1	28,236	Ravanelli, Christie
21 August 2001	Ipswich Town	A	1–3	21,197	Ravanelli
25 August 2001	Fulham	A	0–0	15,641	
8 September 2001	West Ham United	H	0–0	27,802	
15 September 2001	Leicester City	H	2–3	26,863	Burton, Ravanelli (pen)
23 September 2001	Leeds United	A	0–3	39,155	
29 September 2001	Arsenal	H	0–2	29,200	
15 October 2001	Tottenham Hotspur	A	1–3	30,148	Ravanelli
20 October 2001	Charlton Athletic	H	1–1	30,221	Ravanelli
28 October 2001	Chelsea	H	1–1	28,910	Ravanelli
3 November 2001	Middlesbrough	A	1–5	28,117	Ravanelli
17 November 2001	Southampton	H	1–0	32,063	Mawéné
24 November 2001	Newcastle United	A	0–1	50,070	
1 December 2001	Liverpool	H	0–1	33,289	
8 December 2001	Bolton Wanderers	H	1–0	25,712	Christie
12 December 2001	Manchester United	A	0–5	67,577	
15 December 2001	Everton	A	0–1	38,615	
22 December 2001	Aston Villa	H	3–1	28,001	Ravanelli, Carbone, Christie
26 December 2001	West Ham United	A	0–4	31,397	
29 December 2001	Blackburn Rovers	A	1–0	23,529	Christie
2 January 2002	Fulham	H	0–1	28,165	
12 January 2002	Aston Villa	A	1–2	28,881	Powell
19 January 2002	Ipswich Town	H	1–3	29,658	Christie
29 January 2002	Charlton Athletic	A	0–1	25,387	
2 February 2002	Tottenham Hotspur	H	1–0	27,721	Morris
9 February 2002	Sunderland	H	0–1	31,771	
23 February 2002	Leicester City	A	3–0	21,620	Kinkladze, Strupar, Morris
3 March 2002	Manchester United	H	2–2	33,041	Christie (2)
5 March 2002	Arsenal	A	0–1	37,878	
16 March 2002	Bolton Wanderers	A	3–1	25,893	Christie, Ravanelli, Higginbotham (pen)
23 March 2002	Everton	H	3–4	33,297	Strupar (2), Morris
30 March 2002	Chelsea	A	1–2	37,849	Strupar
1 April 2002	Middlesbrough	H	0–1	30,822	
6 April 2002	Southampton	A	0–2	29,263	
13 April 2002	Newcastle United	H	2–3	31,031	Christie, Morris
20 April 2002	Liverpool	A	0–2	43,510	
27 April 2002	Leeds United	H	0–1	30,705	
11 May 2002	Sunderland	A	1–1	47,989	Robinson

=== FA Cup ===
Round	Date	Opponent	Venue	Result	Attendance	Goalscorers
R3	6 January 2002	Bristol Rovers	H	1–3	18,549	Ravanelli

=== League Cup ===
Round	Date	Opponent	Venue	Result	Attendance	Goalscorers
R2	12 September 2001	Hull City	H	3–0	11,246	Burton (2), Kinkladze
R3	10 October 2001	Fulham	A	2–5	9,217	Burley, Ravanelli

== Players ==
=== First-team squad ===
Squad at end of season

Note: Flags indicate national team as defined under FIFA eligibility rules; some limited exceptions apply. Players may hold more than one non-FIFA nationality.

No.	Pos.	Nation	Player
1	GK	EST	Mart Poom
2	DF	ARG	Horacio Carbonari
3	DF	SCO	Brian O'Neil
4	MF	JAM	Darryl Powell (captain) (Note: Powell was born in Lambeth, England, but also qualified to represent Jamaica internationally and made his international debut for Jamaica in 1998.)
6	DF	ENG	Chris Riggott
7	MF	ENG	Rob Lee
8	MF	SCO	Craig Burley
9	FW	JAM	Deon Burton (Note: Burton was born in Reading, England, but also qualified to represent Jamaica internationally and made his international debut for Jamaica in September 1997.)
10	MF	GEO	Georgi Kinkladze
11	FW	ITA	Fabrizio Ravanelli
12	FW	ENG	Malcolm Christie
14	FW	ENG	Lee Morris
15	DF	ENG	Danny Higginbotham (Note: Higginbotham was born in Manchester, England, but also qualified to represent Gibraltar internationally through his maternal grandmother and would make his international debut for Gibraltar in November 2013.)
16	MF	ARG	Luciano Zavagno
17	DF	FRA	Youl Mawéné

No.	Pos.	Nation	Player
18	DF	ENG	Richard Jackson
19	DF	ENG	Steve Elliott
20	FW	SCO	Gary Twigg
21	MF	ENG	Adam Murray
22	DF	ENG	Warren Barton
23	MF	ENG	Paul Boertien
24	GK	ENG	Andy Oakes
25	FW	BEL	Branko Strupar (Note: Strupar was born in Zagreb, SFR Yugoslavia (now Croatia) but became a naturalised Belgian citizen and made his international debut for Belgium in 1999.)
26	FW	ENG	Marvin Robinson
27	GK	SUI	Patrick Foletti
28	MF	FIN	Simo Valakari
29	DF	ENG	Ian Evatt
31	MF	ENG	Adam Bolder
38	DF	FRA	François Grenet

=== Left club during season ===
Note: Flags indicate national team as defined under FIFA eligibility rules; some limited exceptions apply. Players may hold more than one non-FIFA nationality.

No.	Pos.	Nation	Player
7	MF	ENG	Seth Johnson (to Leeds United)
7	FW	ITA	Benito Carbone (on loan from Bradford City)
20	MF	ITA	Stefano Eranio (released)
20	GK	USA	Ian Feuer (on loan from Wimbledon)

No.	Pos.	Nation	Player
22	DF	ITA	Daniele Daino (on loan from Milan)
27	DF	AUS	Con Blatsis (to Colchester United)
37	MF	FRA	Pierre Ducrocq (on loan from Paris Saint-Germain)

=== Reserve squad ===
The following players did not appear for the first team this season.

Note: Flags indicate national team as defined under FIFA eligibility rules; some limited exceptions apply. Players may hold more than one non-FIFA nationality.

No.	Pos.	Nation	Player
5	DF	NOR	Bjørn Otto Bragstad (on loan to Birmingham City)
30	FW	ENG	Marcus Tudgay
32	GK	ENG	Lee Grant
33	MF	ENG	Lewis Hunt
34	DF	NIR	Gareth McKeown

No.	Pos.	Nation	Player
35	MF	IRL	Fiachra McArdle
36	MF	ENG	Matt O'Halloran
—	GK	ENG	Lee Camp
—	DF	ENG	Pablo Mills
—	MF	FIN	Kristoffer Weckström

== Transfers ==
=== In ===
Date	Pos	Name	From	Fee
27 July 2001	FW	(Italy) Fabrizio Ravanelli	Lazio	Free
16 October 2001	DF	(Argentina) Luciano Zavagno	Troyes	Signed
1 November 2001	DF	(France) François Grenet	Bordeaux	£3,000,000
1 February 2002	DF	(England) Warren Barton	Newcastle United	£200,000
7 February 2002	MF	(England) Rob Lee	Newcastle United	£250,000
21 February 2002	GK	(Switzerland) Patrick Foletti	FC Luzern	Free

=== Out ===
Date	Pos	Name	To	Fee
10 July 2001	MF	(Republic of Ireland) Rory Delap	Southampton	£4,000,000
8 October 2001	MF	(Italy) Stefano Eranio	Released	
18 October 2001	MF	(England) Seth Johnson	Leeds United	£7,000,000
15 March 2002	DF	(Australia) Con Blatsis	Colchester United	Free

Transfers in: ▼£3,450,000
Transfers out: ▲£11,000,000
Total spending: ▲£7,550,000

=== Loan in ===
Date	Pos	Name	Club	Return	Ref
8 August 2001	DF	(Italy) Daniele Daino	Milan	8 November 2001	
12 October 2001	GK	(United States) Ian Feuer	Wimbledon	4 November 2001	
16 October 2001	MF	(France) Pierre Ducrocq	Paris Saint-Germain	11 May 2002	
18 October 2001	FW	(Italy) Benito Carbone	Bradford City	10 January 2002	

=== Loan out ===
Date	Pos	Name	Club	Return	Ref
10 August 2001	DF	(England) Ian Evatt	Northampton Town	10 October 2001	
6 September 2001	DF	(Norway) Bjørn Otto Bragstad	Birmingham City	21 September 2001	
22 February 2002	FW	(Jamaica) Deon Burton	Stoke City	12 May 2002	
25 February 2002	MF	(England) Adam Murray	Mansfield Town	21 April 2002	
22 March 2002	DF	(Argentina) Horacio Carbonari	Coventry City	22 April 2002	

== Statistics ==
=== Appearances and goals ===
No.	Pos	Nat	Player	Total		Premier League		FA Cup		League Cup	
No.	Pos	Nat	Player	Apps	Goals	Apps	Goals	Apps	Goals	Apps	Goals
Goalkeepers
1	GK	(Estonia) EST	Mart Poom	16	0	15	0	1	0	0	0
24	GK	(England) ENG	Andy Oakes	22	0	20	0	0	0	2	0
27	GK	(Switzerland) SUI	Patrick Foletti	2	0	1+1	0	0	0	0	0
Defenders and wing-backs
2	DF	(Argentina) ARG	Horacio Carbonari	4	0	3	0	1	0	0	0
3	DF	(Scotland) SCO	Brian O'Neil	11	0	8+2	0	0	0	0+1	0
6	DF	(England) ENG	Chris Riggott	39	0	37	0	0	0	2	0
15	DF	(England) ENG	Danny Higginbotham	40	1	37	1	1	0	2	0
16	DF	(Argentina) ARG	Luciano Zavagno	27	0	26	0	1	0	0	0
17	DF	(France) FRA	Youl Mawéné	20	1	17	1	1	0	2	0
18	DF	(England) ENG	Richard Jackson	7	0	6+1	0	0	0	0	0
19	DF	(England) ENG	Steve Elliott	6	0	2+4	0	0	0	0	0
22	DF	(England) ENG	Warren Barton	14	0	14	0	0	0	0	0
29	DF	(England) ENG	Ian Evatt	3	0	1+2	0	0	0	0	0
38	DF	(France) FRA	François Grenet	16	0	12+3	0	1	0	0	0
Midfielders
4	MF	(Jamaica) JAM	Darryl Powell	24	1	23	1	0	0	1	0
7	MF	(England) ENG	Rob Lee	13	0	13	0	0	0	0	0
8	MF	(Scotland) SCO	Craig Burley	13	1	11	0	0	0	2	1
10	MF	(Georgia (country)) GEO	Georgi Kinkladze	25	2	13+11	1	0	0	1	1
21	MF	(England) ENG	Adam Murray	8	0	3+3	0	0	0	2	0
23	MF	(England) ENG	Paul Boertien	34	0	23+9	0	1	0	1	0
28	MF	(Finland) FIN	Simo Valakari	10	0	6+3	0	0	0	1	0
31	MF	(England) ENG	Adam Bolder	12	0	2+9	0	1	0	0	0
37	MF	(France) FRA	Pierre Ducrocq	19	0	19	0	0	0	0	0
Forwards
9	FW	(Jamaica) JAM	Deon Burton	19	3	8+9	1	0	0	2	2
11	FW	(Italy) ITA	Fabrizio Ravanelli	34	11	30+1	9	1	1	2	1
12	FW	(England) ENG	Malcolm Christie	37	9	27+8	9	1	0	0+1	0
14	FW	(England) ENG	Lee Morris	16	4	9+6	4	0+1	0	0	0
20	FW	(Scotland) SCO	Gary Twigg	1	0	0+1	0	0	0	0	0
25	FW	(Belgium) BEL	Branko Strupar	12	4	8+4	4	0	0	0	0
26	FW	(England) ENG	Marvin Robinson	2	1	0+2	1	0	0	0	0
Players transferred out during the season
7	MF	(England) ENG	Seth Johnson	8	0	7	0	0	0	1	0
7	MF	(Italy) ITA	Benito Carbone	14	1	13	1	1	0	0	0
20	GK	(United States) USA	Ian Feuer	2	0	2	0	0	0	0	0
22	DF	(Italy) ITA	Daniele Daino	4	0	2	0	0	0	1+1	0
