= 2000–01 Derby County F.C. season =

Derby County F.C.
2000–01 season
- Chairman: Lionel Pickering
- Manager: Jim Smith
- Stadium: Pride Park Stadium
- FA Premier League: 17th
- FA Cup: Fourth round
- League Cup: Fourth round
- Top goalscorer: League: Malcolm Christie (8); All: Malcolm Christie (12)
- Highest home attendance: 33,239 vs Ipswich Town (19 May 2001, FA Premier League)
- Lowest home attendance: 11,273 vs Norwich City (1 November 2000, League Cup)
- Average home league attendance: 28,551
Home colours	Away colours	Third colours

During the 2000–01 English football season, Derby County competed in the FA Premier League.

== Season summary ==
Derby's season started with one defeat and four draws in their first five games during which they scored 11 goals. However, the goals soon dried up and overall, another season of struggle plagued Pride Park, but Jim Smith's men were saved with one week of the season left after a shock 1–0 win over champions Manchester United at Old Trafford as well as Manchester City losing their penultimate game of the season at Ipswich Town. The attention was then quickly focused on improving the squad for 2001–02 in a bid to prevent another relegation battle.

== Final league table ==
Pos	Team	Pld	W	D	L	GF	GA	GD	Pts	Qualification or relegation
15	West Ham United	38	10	12	16	45	50	−5	42	
16	Everton	38	11	9	18	45	59	−14	42	
17	Derby County	38	10	12	16	37	59	−22	42	
18	Manchester City (R)	38	8	10	20	41	65	−24	34	Relegation to the Football League First Division
19	Coventry City (R)	38	8	10	20	36	63	−27	34	Relegation to the Football League First Division

Source: Premier League
Rules for classification: 1) points; 2) goal difference; 3) number of goals scored.
(R) Relegated

Results summary

Overall								Home						Away					
Pld	W	D	L	GF	GA	GD	Pts	W	D	L	GF	GA	GD	W	D	L	GF	GA	GD
38	10	12	16	37	59	−22	42	8	7	4	23	24	−1	2	5	12	14	35	−21

Source: 2000–01 FA Premier League table

Results by round

Round	1	2	3	4	5	6	7	8	9	10	11	12	13	14	15	16	17	18	19	20	21	22	23	24	25	26	27	28	29	30	31	32	33	34	35	36	37	38
Ground	H	A	A	H	H	A	H	A	H	A	A	H	A	H	H	A	A	H	H	A	A	H	A	H	A	H	A	H	H	A	A	H	A	H	A	H	A	H
Result	D	L	D	D	D	L	D	L	L	L	L	D	D	W	L	W	L	W	W	D	L	W	L	D	L	W	D	W	W	D	L	L	L	W	L	L	W	D
Position	8	17	17	17	16	19	19	20	20	20	20	20	19	19	19	17	17	17	16	16	16	15	17	17	17	16	16	16	14	15	16	16	17	16	17	17	16	17

Source: 11v11.com: 2000–01 Derby County results
A = Away; H = Home; W = Win; D = Draw; L = Loss

== Results ==
Derby County's score comes first

=== Legend ===
Win	Draw	Loss

=== FA Premier League ===
Date	Opponent	Venue	Result	Attendance	Scorers
19 August 2000	Southampton	H	2–2	27,223	Strupar, Burton
23 August 2000	Newcastle United	A	2–3	51,327	Strupar, Johnson
26 August 2000	Everton	A	2–2	34,840	Sturridge, Strupar
6 September 2000	Middlesbrough	H	3–3	24,290	Christie (2), Strupar
10 September 2000	Charlton Athletic	H	2–2	22,310	Christie, Valakari
16 September 2000	Sunderland	A	1–2	45,343	Christie
23 September 2000	Leeds United	H	1–1	26,248	Kinkladze
30 September 2000	Aston Villa	A	1–4	26,534	Riggott
15 October 2000	Liverpool	H	0–4	30,532	
21 October 2000	Tottenham Hotspur	A	1–3	34,483	Riggott
28 October 2000	Leicester City	A	1–2	20,525	Delap
6 November 2000	West Ham United	H	0–0	24,621	
11 November 2000	Arsenal	A	0–0	37,679	
18 November 2000	Bradford City	H	2–0	31,614	Christie, Delap
25 November 2000	Manchester United	H	0–3	32,910	
2 December 2000	Ipswich Town	A	1–0	22,003	Delap
9 December 2000	Chelsea	A	1–4	34,317	Riggott
16 December 2000	Coventry City	H	1–0	27,869	Christie
23 December 2000	Newcastle United	H	2–0	29,978	Carbonari, Burton
26 December 2000	Manchester City	A	0–0	34,321	
30 December 2000	Southampton	A	0–1	15,075	
1 January 2001	Everton	H	1–0	27,358	Burton
13 January 2001	Middlesbrough	A	0–4	29,041	
20 January 2001	Manchester City	H	1–1	31,174	Powell
30 January 2001	Charlton Athletic	A	1–2	20,043	Burley
3 February 2001	Sunderland	H	1–0	29,129	Burley
10 February 2001	Leeds United	A	0–0	38,789	
24 February 2001	Aston Villa	H	1–0	27,289	Burton (pen)
3 March 2001	Tottenham Hotspur	H	2–1	29,410	Strupar (2, 1 pen)
18 March 2001	Liverpool	A	1–1	43,362	Burton
31 March 2001	Coventry City	A	0–2	19,654	
7 April 2001	Chelsea	H	0–4	29,320	
14 April 2001	West Ham United	A	1–3	25,319	Guðjónsson
16 April 2001	Leicester City	H	2–0	28,387	Boertien, Eranio
21 April 2001	Bradford City	A	0–2	18,564	
28 April 2001	Arsenal	H	1–2	29,567	Eranio
5 May 2001	Manchester United	A	1–0	67,526	Christie
19 May 2001	Ipswich Town	H	1–1	33,239	Christie

=== FA Cup ===
Round	Date	Opponent	Venue	Result	Attendance	Goalscorers
R3	6 January 2001	West Bromwich Albion	H	3–2	19,232	Christie (2), Eranio
R4	27 January 2001	Blackburn Rovers	A	0–0	18,858	
R4R	7 February 2001	Blackburn Rovers	H	2–5	15,203	Riggott, Eranio

=== League Cup ===
Round	Date	Opponent	Venue	Result	Attendance	Goalscorers
R2 1st Leg	19 September 2000	West Bromwich Albion	H	1–2	12,183	Burton
R2 2nd Leg	26 September 2000	West Bromwich Albion	A	4–2 (won 5–4 on agg)	19,112	Bragstad (2), Riggott, Burley
R3	1 November 2000	Norwich City	H	3–0	11,273	Delap, Burley (pen), Christie
R4	29 November 2000	Fulham	A	2–3	11,761	Christie, Powell

== Players ==
=== First-team squad ===
Squad at end of season

Note: Flags indicate national team as defined under FIFA eligibility rules; some limited exceptions apply. Players may hold more than one non-FIFA nationality.

No.	Pos.	Nation	Player
1	GK	EST	Mart Poom
2	DF	ARG	Horacio Carbonari
3	DF	SCO	Brian O'Neil
4	MF	JAM	Darryl Powell (Note: Powell was born in Lambeth, England, but also qualified to represent Jamaica internationally and made his international debut for Jamaica in 1998.) (captain)
5	MF	IRL	Rory Delap (Note: Delap was born in Sutton Coldfield, England, but also qualified to represent the Republic of Ireland internationally through his parents and represented them at U-21 level before making his international debut for the Republic of Ireland in March 1998.)
6	MF	SCO	Craig Burley
7	MF	ENG	Seth Johnson
9	FW	JAM	Deon Burton (Note: Burton was born in Reading, England, but also qualified to represent Jamaica internationally and made his international debut for Jamaica in September 1997.)
10	MF	GEO	Georgi Kinkladze
11	MF	ENG	Lee Morris
12	FW	ENG	Malcolm Christie
14	MF	ISL	Þórður Guðjónsson (on loan from Las Palmas)
15	DF	ENG	Danny Higginbotham
16	DF	FRA	Lilian Martin (on loan from Marseille)
17	DF	FRA	Youl Mawéné
18	DF	ENG	Richard Jackson
19	DF	ENG	Steve Elliott

No.	Pos.	Nation	Player
20	MF	ITA	Stefano Eranio
21	DF	ENG	Chris Riggott
22	DF	NOR	Bjørn Otto Bragstad
23	DF	ENG	Paul Boertien
24	GK	ENG	Andy Oakes
25	FW	BEL	Branko Strupar (Note: Strupar was born in Zagreb, SFR Yugoslavia (now Croatia) but became a naturalised Belgian citizen and made his international debut for Belgium in 1999.)
26	FW	ENG	Marvin Robinson
27	DF	AUS	Con Blatsis
28	MF	FIN	Simo Valakari
29	DF	ENG	Ian Evatt
30	MF	ENG	Adam Murray
31	MF	ENG	Adam Bolder
32	GK	ENG	Lee Grant
33	MF	ENG	Lewis Hunt
34	DF	NGA	Taribo West (on loan from AC Milan)
35	MF	IRL	Fiachra McArdle

=== Left the club during season ===
Note: Flags indicate national team as defined under FIFA eligibility rules; some limited exceptions apply. Players may hold more than one non-FIFA nationality.

No.	Pos.	Nation	Player
3	DF	GER	Stefan Schnoor (to Wolfsburg)
8	FW	ENG	Dean Sturridge (to Leicester City)

No.	Pos.	Nation	Player
14	MF	NOR	Lars Bohinen (to Lyngby Boldklub)
16	DF	DEN	Jacob Laursen (to København)

=== Reserve squad ===
Note: Flags indicate national team as defined under FIFA eligibility rules; some limited exceptions apply. Players may hold more than one non-FIFA nationality.

No.	Pos.	Nation	Player
—	GK	NIR	Gerard Doherty (Note: Doherty represented the Republic of Ireland at Under-18 level before being selected for Northern Ireland's senior squad against Malta in 2013.)
—	DF	ENG	Wayne Adams
—	DF	WAL	Karl Brown
—	MF	ENG	Patrick Bannister

No.	Pos.	Nation	Player
—	MF	IRL	Brendon Canning
—	MF	FIN	Kristoffer Weckström
—	FW	ENG	Scott Rickards
—	FW	SCO	Gary Twigg

== Transfers ==
=== In ===
Date	Pos	Name	From	Fee
1 June 2000	MF	Simo Valakari	Motherwell	Free transfer
5 July 2000	DF	Danny Higginbotham	Manchester United	£2,000,000
26 July 2000	DF	Bjørn Otto Bragstad	Rosenborg	£1,500,000
2 August 2000	DF	Youl Mawéné	RC Lens	£500,000
8 August 2000	DF	Con Blatsis	South Melbourne	£150,000
1 November 2000	DF	Lilian Martin	Marseille	Loan
2 November 2000	DF	Taribo West	Milan	Monthly
13 November 2000	DF	Brian O'Neil	VfL Wolfsburg	Swap
1 March 2001	MF	Þórður Guðjónsson	Las Palmas	Loan

=== Out ===
Date	Pos	Name	To	Fee
20 May 2000	MF	Marc Bridge-Wilkinson	Port Vale	Free transfer
6 June 2000	GK	Richard Knight	Oxford United	Free transfer
16 June 2000	FW	Esteban Fuertes	RC Lens	£2,800,000
5 July 2000	MF	Mikkel Beck	Lille	£500,000
11 July 2000	FW	Sinclair Le Geyt	Port Vale	Free transfer
12 July 2000	DF	Tony Dorigo	Stoke City	Free transfer
24 August 2000	DF	Jacob Laursen	FC Copenhagen	Free transfer
13 November 2000	DF	Stefan Schnoor	VfL Wolfsburg	Swap
19 January 2001	FW	Dean Sturridge	Leicester City	£350,000
23 January 2001	MF	Lars Bohinen	Lyngby Boldklub	Free transfer

Transfers in: ▼£4,150,000
Transfers out: ▲£3,650,000
Total spending: ▼£500,000

=== Loan in ===
- (France) Lilian Martin – (France) Marseille, 1 November
- (Nigeria) Taribo West – (Italy) A.C. Milan, 2 November, three-month loan (later extended by a further five months on 24 January)
- (Iceland) Þórður Guðjónsson – (Spain) Las Palmas, 1 March, three-month loan

== Statistics ==
=== Starting 11 ===
Considering starts in all competitions

- GK: #1, (Estonia) Mart Poom, 38
- RB: #5, (Republic of Ireland) Rory Delap, 35
- CB: #2, (Argentina) Horacio Carbonari, 31
- CB: #21, (England) Chris Riggott, 34
- LB: #15, (England) Danny Higginbotham, 28
- RM: #6, (Scotland) Craig Burley, 28
- CM: #4, (Jamaica) Darryl Powell, 30
- CM: #7, (England) Seth Johnson, 34
- LM: #20, (Italy) Stefano Eranio, 29
- CF: #12, (England) Malcolm Christie, 36
- CF: #9, (Jamaica) Deon Burton, 29
