= 1999–2000 Derby County F.C. season =

Derby County
1999–2000 season
- Chairman: Lionel Pickering
- Manager: Jim Smith
- Stadium: Pride Park
- Premier League: 16th
- FA Cup: Third round
- League Cup: Third round
- Top goalscorer: Delap (8)
- Highest home attendance: 33,378 (vs. Liverpool, 18 March)
- Lowest home attendance: 19,152 (vs. Swansea City, 22 September)
- Average home league attendance: 29,351
Home colours	Away colours

The 1999–2000 English football season was Derby County F.C.'s fourth consecutive season in the FA Premier League (known as the FA Carling Premiership for sponsorship reasons).

== Season summary ==
After two successive top 10 finishes which gave promise a possible bid for a UEFA Cup place, Derby County endured their most difficult season in recent year as they finished 16th with a mere 38 points, just two places and five points clear of relegation.

== Final League Table ==
Pos	Team	Pld	W	D	L	GF	GA	GD	Pts	Qualification or relegation
14	Coventry City	38	12	8	18	47	54	−7	44	
15	Southampton	38	12	8	18	45	62	−17	44	
16	Derby County	38	9	11	18	44	57	−13	38	
17	Bradford City	38	9	9	20	38	68	−30	36	Qualification for the Intertoto Cup second round
18	Wimbledon (R)	38	7	12	19	46	74	−28	33	Relegation to the Football League First Division

Source: Premier League
Rules for classification: 1) points; 2) goal difference; 3) number of goals scored.
(R) Relegated

Results summary

Overall								Home						Away					
Pld	W	D	L	GF	GA	GD	Pts	W	D	L	GF	GA	GD	W	D	L	GF	GA	GD
38	9	11	18	44	57	−13	38	6	3	10	22	25	−3	3	8	8	22	32	−10

Source: 1999–2000 FA Premier League table

Results by round

Round	1	2	3	4	5	6	7	8	9	10	11	12	13	14	15	16	17	18	19	20	21	22	23	24	25	26	27	28	29	30	31	32	33	34	35	36	37	38
Ground	A	H	H	A	A	H	A	H	H	A	H	A	H	A	H	A	H	A	H	A	H	A	H	H	A	A	H	A	H	A	H	A	H	A	H	A	H	A
Result	D	L	L	L	W	W	D	L	L	D	L	L	W	L	L	L	L	W	L	D	W	W	D	D	L	D	W	L	L	L	W	D	L	D	W	D	D	L
Position	9	15	17	19	18	13	14	15	17	16	17	19	16	17	18	18	18	18	18	18	17	16	16	17	17	17	17	17	17	17	17	16	16	16	16	16	16	16

Source: 11v11.com: 1999–2000 Derby County results
A = Away; H = Home; W = Win; D = Draw; L = Loss

== Results ==
Derby County's score comes first

=== Legend ===
Win	Draw	Loss

=== FA Premier League ===
Date	Opponent	Venue	Result	Attendance	Scorers
7 August 1999	Leeds United	A	0–0	40,118	
10 August 1999	Arsenal	H	1–2	25,901	Delap
14 August 1999	Middlesbrough	H	1–3	24,045	Burton
21 August 1999	Coventry City	A	0–2	17,685	
25 August 1999	Sheffield Wednesday	A	2–0	20,943	Delap, Sturridge
28 August 1999	Everton	H	1–0	26,550	Fuertes
11 September 1999	Wimbledon	A	2–2	12,282	Carbonari, Johnson
18 September 1999	Sunderland	H	0–5	28,264	
25 September 1999	Bradford City	H	0–1	31,305	
4 October 1999	Southampton	A	3–3	14,208	Delap, Laursen, Beck
16 October 1999	Tottenham Hotspur	H	0–1	29,815	
25 October 1999	Newcastle United	A	0–2	35,614	
30 October 1999	Chelsea	H	3–1	28,614	Burton, Delap (2)
6 November 1999	Liverpool	A	0–2	44,467	
20 November 1999	Manchester United	H	1–2	33,370	Delap
28 November 1999	Arsenal	A	1–2	37,964	Sturridge
5 December 1999	Leeds United	H	0–1	29,455	
18 December 1999	Leicester City	A	1–0	18,581	Powell
26 December 1999	Aston Villa	H	0–2	33,222	
28 December 1999	West Ham United	A	1–1	24,998	Sturridge
3 January 2000	Watford	H	2–0	28,072	Strupar (2)
15 January 2000	Middlesbrough	A	4–1	32,745	Christie (2), Burton, Burley
22 January 2000	Coventry City	H	0–0	28,381	
5 February 2000	Sheffield Wednesday	H	3–3	30,100	Strupar, Burley, Hinchcliffe (own goal)
12 February 2000	Everton	A	1–2	33,268	Nimni
26 February 2000	Sunderland	A	1–1	41,940	Christie
4 March 2000	Wimbledon	H	4–0	28,384	Kinkladze, Christie, Sturridge, Burton
11 March 2000	Manchester United	A	1–3	61,619	Strupar
18 March 2000	Liverpool	H	0–2	33,378	
25 March 2000	Aston Villa	A	0–2	28,613	
2 April 2000	Leicester City	H	3–0	25,763	Burley, Delap, Sturridge
8 April 2000	Watford	A	0–0	16,579	
15 April 2000	West Ham United	H	1–2	31,202	Sturridge
21 April 2000	Bradford City	A	4–4	18,276	Delap, Strupar, Burley (2 pens)
24 April 2000	Southampton	H	2–0	29,403	Powell, Christie
29 April 2000	Tottenham Hotspur	A	1–1	33,044	Carbonari
6 May 2000	Newcastle United	H	0–0	32,724	
14 May 2000	Chelsea	A	0–4	35,084	

=== FA Cup ===
Round	Date	Opponent	Venue	Result	Attendance	Goalscorers
R3	11 December 1999	Burnley	H	0–1	23,400	

=== League Cup ===
Round	Date	Opponent	Venue	Result	Attendance	Goalscorers
R2 1st Leg	14 September 1999	Swansea City	A	0–0	6,260	
R2 2nd Leg	22 September 1999	Swansea City	H	3–1 (won 3–1 on agg)	19,152	Fuertes, Sturridge, Borbokis
R3	13 October 1999	Bolton Wanderers	H	1–2	20,242	Beck

== Players ==
=== First-team squad ===
Squad at end of season

Note: Flags indicate national team as defined under FIFA eligibility rules; some limited exceptions apply. Players may hold more than one non-FIFA nationality.

No.	Pos.	Nation	Player
2	DF	ARG	Horacio Carbonari
3	DF	GER	Stefan Schnoor
4	MF	JAM	Darryl Powell (Note: Powell was born in Lambeth, England, but also qualified to represent Jamaica internationally and made his international debut for Jamaica in 1998.)
5	DF	ENG	Tony Dorigo (Note: Dorigo was born in Adelaide, Australia, but also qualified to represent England internationally after obtaining citizenship and made his international debut for England in 1989.)
6	FW	ENG	Lee Morris
7	MF	ENG	Seth Johnson
8	FW	ENG	Dean Sturridge
9	FW	JAM	Deon Burton (Note: Burton was born in Reading, England, but also qualified to represent Jamaica internationally and made his international debut for Jamaica in September 1997.)
10	MF	IRL	Rory Delap (Note: Delap was born in Sutton Coldfield, England, but also qualified to represent the Republic of Ireland internationally through his parents and represented them at U-21 level before making his international debut for the Republic of Ireland in March 1998.)
12	FW	ENG	Malcolm Christie
14	MF	NOR	Lars Bohinen
15	MF	ENG	Marc Bridge-Wilkinson
16	DF	DEN	Jacob Laursen
18	DF	ENG	Richard Jackson
19	DF	ENG	Steve Elliott

No.	Pos.	Nation	Player
20	FW	ARG	Esteban Fuertes
21	GK	EST	Mart Poom
23	MF	ENG	Paul Boertien
24	GK	ENG	Andy Oakes
25	FW	DEN	Mikkel Beck
26	FW	ENG	Marvin Robinson
27	MF	GEO	Georgi Kinkladze
28	MF	ENG	Adam Murray
29	MF	ITA	Stefano Eranio
30	DF	ENG	Danny Porter
31	DF	ENG	Chris Riggott
32	GK	ENG	Richard Knight
33	MF	SCO	Craig Burley
35	FW	BEL	Branko Strupar (Note: Strupar was born in Zagreb, SFR Yugoslavia (now Croatia) but became a naturalised Belgian citizen and made his international debut for Belgium in 1999.)

=== Left club during season ===
Note: Flags indicate national team as defined under FIFA eligibility rules; some limited exceptions apply. Players may hold more than one non-FIFA nationality.

No.	Pos.	Nation	Player
1	GK	ENG	Russell Hoult (to Portsmouth)
6	DF	CRO	Igor Štimac (to West Ham United)
11	MF	SCO	Kevin Harper (Note: Harper was born in Oldham, England, but also qualified to represent Scotland internationally and represented them at U-21 level.) (to Portsmouth)
13	MF	ISR	Avi Nimni (on loan from Maccabi Tel Aviv)

No.	Pos.	Nation	Player
17	DF	ENG	Spencer Prior (to Manchester City)
22	DF	GRE	Vasilios Borbokis (to PAOK)
27	FW	ITA	Francesco Baiano (to Ternana)

=== Reserve squad ===
Note: Flags indicate national team as defined under FIFA eligibility rules; some limited exceptions apply. Players may hold more than one non-FIFA nationality.

No.	Pos.	Nation	Player
34	GK	IRL	Gerard Doherty
36	DF	ENG	Wayne Adams
37	DF	ENG	Ian Evatt
38	DF	WAL	Karl Brown

No.	Pos.	Nation	Player
39	MF	ENG	Adam Bolder
40	MF	IRL	Brendon Canning
41	FW	ENG	Sinclair Le Geyt

== Transfers ==
=== In ===
Date	Pos.	Name	From	Fee
18 May 1999	MF	Seth Johnson	Crewe Alexandra	£4,100,000
3 June 1999	GK	Andy Oakes	Hull City	£460,000
14 October 1999	FW	Lee Morris	Sheffield United	£3,000,000
25 November 1999	MF	Avi Nimni	Maccabi Tel Aviv	Loan
1 December 1999	MF	Craig Burley	Celtic	£3,000,000
17 December 1999	FW	Branko Strupar	Racing Genk	£3,000,000
27 March 2000	MF	Adam Bolder	Hull City	£113,000
19 April 2000	MF	Georgi Kinkladze	Ajax	£3,000,000

=== Out ===
Date	Pos.	Name	To	Fee
10 June 1999	GK	Tom Phillips	Hibernian	Free
10 June 1999	DF	Colin Morton	Hibernian	Free
15 June 1999	DF	James Wall	Hereford United	Free
16 July 1999	FW	Paulo Wanchope	West Ham United	£3,500,000
29 August 1999	DF	Igor Štimac	West Ham United	£600,000
11 November 1999	FW	Francesco Baiano	Ternana	Free
31 December 1999	DF	Vasilios Borbokis	PAOK	Free
1 March 2000	MF	Avi Nimni	Maccabi Tel Aviv	Loan Return
6 March 2000	MF	Kevin Harper	Portsmouth	£300,000
22 March 2000	DF	Spencer Prior	Manchester City	£500,000
23 March 2000	GK	Russell Hoult	Portsmouth	£300,000

Transfers in: ▼£12,460,000
Transfers out: ▲£4,900,000
Total spending: ▼£7,560,000

== Statistics ==
=== Starting 11 ===
Considering starts in all competitions
Considering a 3–5–2 formation

- GK: #21, (Estonia) Mart Poom, 29
- CB: #16, (Denmark) Jacob Laursen, 38
- CB: #2, (Argentina) Horacio Carbonari, 31 (#17, (England) Spencer Prior, has 18 starts as a central defender)
- CB: #5, (England) Tony Dorigo, 24 (#19, (England) Steve Elliott, has 22 starts as a central and left defender)
- RM: #10, (Republic of Ireland) Rory Delap, 37
- CM: #4, (Jamaica) Darryl Powell, 33
- CM: #7, (England) Seth Johnson, 37
- CM: #29, (Italy) Stefano Eranio, 18 (#33, (Scotland) Craig Burley, has 19 starts as a right and central midfielder)
- LM: #3, (Germany) Stefan Schnoor, 22
- CF: #8, (England) Dean Sturridge, 16
- CF: #9, (Jamaica) Deon Burton, 15
