= 2002–03 Derby County F.C. season =

Derby County
2002–03 season
- Chairman: Lionel Pickering
- Manager: John Gregory (until 21 March); George Burley (from 31 March)
- Stadium: Pride Park Stadium
- First Division: 18th
- FA Cup: Third round
- League Cup: Second round
- Top goalscorer: League: Christie (8); All: Christie (9)
- Highest home attendance: 33,016 (vs. Reading, 10 August 2002)
- Lowest home attendance: 21,014 (vs. Millwall, 16 April 2003)
- Average home league attendance: 25,469

During the 2002–03 English football season, Derby County competed in the Football League First Division, following relegation from the FA Premier League the previous season.

== Season summary ==
Derby were expected to make a bid for an immediate return to the Premiership, but struggled all season which resulted in manager John Gregory being sacked in March and replaced by former Ipswich Town manager George Burley, who led the team to a secure but disappointing 18th-place finish.

== Kit ==
Derby retained the previous season's home kit, manufactured by Italian company Erreà and sponsored by Pedigree.

== Final league table ==
Pos	Team	Pld	W	D	L	GF	GA	GD	Pts
16	Burnley	46	15	10	21	65	89	−24	55
17	Walsall	46	15	9	22	57	69	−12	54
18	Derby County	46	15	7	24	55	74	−19	52
19	Bradford City	46	14	10	22	51	73	−22	52
20	Coventry City	46	12	14	20	46	62	−16	50

Updated to match(es) played on 11 May 2003. Source: Soccerway
Rules for classification: 1) points; 2) goal difference; 3) number of goals scored.

== Results ==
Derby County's score comes first

=== Legend ===
Win	Draw	Loss

=== Football League First Division ===
Date	Opponent	Venue	Result	Attendance	Scorers
10 August 2002	Reading	H	3–0	33,016	Lee, Ravanelli, Christie
13 August 2002	Gillingham	A	0–1	8,775	
17 August 2002	Grimsby Town	A	2–1	5,810	Bolder (2)
24 August 2002	Wolverhampton Wanderers	H	1–4	29,954	Christie
26 August 2002	Rotherham United	A	1–2	8,408	Strupar
31 August 2002	Stoke City	H	2–0	21,723	Christie (2)
7 September 2002	Burnley	H	1–2	22,343	Bolder
14 September 2002	Leicester City	A	1–3	31,049	Riggott
17 September 2002	Crystal Palace	A	1–0	14,948	Kinkladze
21 September 2002	Preston North End	H	0–2	29,257	
28 September 2002	Ipswich Town	A	1–0	24,439	Carbonari
5 October 2002	Walsall	H	2–2	25,247	Christie (2)
12 October 2002	Bradford City	A	0–0	13,385	
20 October 2002	Nottingham Forest	H	0–0	30,547	
26 October 2002	Millwall	A	0–3	8,116	
30 October 2002	Sheffield United	H	2–1	23,525	McLeod, Burton
2 November 2002	Sheffield Wednesday	A	3–1	19,747	Morris (2), McLeod
9 November 2002	Portsmouth	H	1–2	26,587	Higginbotham (pen)
16 November 2002	Brighton & Hove Albion	A	0–1	6,845	
25 November 2002	Wimbledon	H	3–2	25,597	Elliott, Burton, Morris
30 November 2002	Norwich City	A	0–1	20,522	
7 December 2002	Watford	H	3–0	21,653	Morris, Riggott, Burton
14 December 2002	Brighton & Hove Albion	H	1–0	25,786	Higginbotham (pen)
21 December 2002	Coventry City	A	0–3	13,185	
26 December 2002	Grimsby Town	H	1–3	27,141	Morris
28 December 2002	Reading	A	1–2	16,299	Burley (pen)
1 January 2003	Wolverhampton Wanderers	A	1–1	26,442	Christie
11 January 2003	Gillingham	H	1–1	22,769	Zavagno (pen)
18 January 2003	Stoke City	A	3–1	17,308	Christie, Zavagno, Morris
1 February 2003	Rotherham United	H	3–0	26,257	Kinkladze, Bolder, McLeod
8 February 2003	Portsmouth	A	2–6	19,503	Morris, Kinkladze (pen)
15 February 2003	Sheffield Wednesday	H	2–2	26,311	Bolder (2)
22 February 2003	Burnley	A	0–2	15,063	
1 March 2003	Leicester City	H	1–1	24,307	Burley
5 March 2003	Crystal Palace	H	0–1	22,682	
8 March 2003	Preston North End	A	2–4	14,003	Ravanelli (2)
15 March 2003	Bradford City	H	1–2	23,735	Morris
19 March 2003	Nottingham Forest	A	0–3	29,725	
22 March 2003	Sheffield United	A	0–2	18,401	
5 April 2003	Norwich City	H	2–1	23,643	Burley, Kenton (own goal)
12 April 2003	Wimbledon	A	2–0	1,934	Valakari, Boertien
16 April 2003	Millwall	H	1–2	21,014	Kinkladze
19 April 2003	Coventry City	H	1–0	23,921	Ravanelli
21 April 2003	Watford	A	0–2	11,909	
26 April 2003	Walsall	A	2–3	8,416	Valakari, Ravanelli
4 May 2003	Ipswich Town	H	1–4	28,785	Lee

=== FA Cup ===
Round	Date	Opponent	Venue	Result	Attendance	Goalscorers
R3	4 January 2003	Brentford	A	0–1	8,709	

=== League Cup ===
Round	Date	Opponent	Venue	Result	Attendance	Goalscorers
R1	10 September 2002	Mansfield Town	A	3–1	5,788	Morris, Christie, Evatt
R2	2 October 2002	Oldham Athletic	H	1–2 (a.e.t.)	9,029	Higginbotham (pen)

== Players ==
=== First-team squad ===
Squad at end of season

Note: Flags indicate national team as defined under FIFA eligibility rules; some limited exceptions apply. Players may hold more than one non-FIFA nationality.

No.	Pos.	Nation	Player
2	DF	ENG	Warren Barton
3	DF	ARG	Luciano Zavagno
5	DF	ENG	Steve Elliott
6	DF	SCO	Paul Ritchie (on loan from Manchester City)
7	MF	ENG	Rob Lee
9	FW	BEL	Branko Strupar (Note: Strupar was born in Zagreb, SFR Yugoslavia (now Croatia) but became a naturalised Belgian citizen and made his international debut for Belgium in 1999.)
10	FW	ENG	Tommy Mooney (on loan from Birmingham City)
11	FW	ENG	Lee Morris
13	GK	ENG	Lee Grant
14	DF	ENG	Richard Jackson
16	MF	SCO	Craig Burley
17	DF	ENG	Paul Boertien
18	MF	GEO	Georgi Kinkladze
21	FW	ITA	Fabrizio Ravanelli
22	MF	ENG	Adam Murray
23	FW	ENG	Marvin Robinson
24	GK	ENG	Andy Oakes

No.	Pos.	Nation	Player
25	DF	ENG	Ian Evatt
26	MF	ENG	Adam Bolder
28	DF	FRA	Youl Mawéné
31	DF	ENG	Chris Palmer
32	MF	ENG	Matt O'Halloran
33	MF	FIN	Simo Valakari
34	FW	ENG	Marcus Tudgay
35	MF	ENG	Lewis Hunt
36	MF	SCO	Lewis Green
37	DF	ENG	Pablo Mills
38	MF	FIN	Kris Weckstrom
39	MF	IRL	Barry Molloy
40	FW	ENG	Izale McLeod
41	DF	ENG	Tom Huddlestone
44	MF	ENG	Lee Holmes
45	GK	ENG	Lee Camp (Note: Camp was born in Derby, England, and represented them at U-21 level, but also qualifies to represent Northern Ireland internationally and would make his full international debut for Northern Ireland in March 2011.)

=== Left club during season ===
Note: Flags indicate national team as defined under FIFA eligibility rules; some limited exceptions apply. Players may hold more than one non-FIFA nationality.

No.	Pos.	Nation	Player
1	GK	EST	Mart Poom (to Sunderland)
4	DF	ENG	Danny Higginbotham (Note: Higginbotham was born in Manchester, England, but also qualified to represent Gibraltar internationally through his maternal grandmother and would make his international debut for Gibraltar in November 2013.) (to Southampton)
6	DF	ENG	Chris Riggott (to Middlesbrough)
8	FW	ENG	Nick Chadwick (on loan from Everton)
10	FW	ENG	Malcolm Christie (to Middlesbrough)
15	MF	SCO	Brian O'Neil (to Preston North End)

No.	Pos.	Nation	Player
20	FW	JAM	Deon Burton (Note: Burton was born in Reading, England, but also qualified to represent Jamaica internationally and made his international debut for Jamaica in September 1997.) (to Portsmouth)
27	DF	FRA	François Grenet (to Rennes)
29	DF	NOR	Bjørn Otto Bragstad (to SW Bregenz)
30	DF	ARG	Horacio Carbonari (to Rosario Central)
31	MF	IRL	Fiachra McArdle (released)

== Transfers ==
=== In ===
- Paul Ritchie – Manchester City, loan
- Tommy Mooney – Birmingham City, 19 March, loan
- Nick Chadwick – Everton, loan

=== Out ===
- Darryl Powell – released (later joined Birmingham City on 12 September)
- Brian O'Neil – released, 27 November (later joined Preston North End)
- Fiachra McArdle – released, 27 November
- Deon Burton – Portsmouth, 11 December, £250,000
- Mart Poom – Sunderland, 10 January, £2,500,000
- Chris Riggott and Malcolm Christie– Middlesbrough, 31 January, £3,000,000 combined
- Danny Higginbotham – Southampton, 31 January, £1,500,000
- Bjørn Otto Bragstad – released (later joined SW Bregenz)
- Horacio Carbonari – released (later joined Rosario Central)

=== Loan out ===
- Deon Burton – Portsmouth, 9 August
- François Grenet – Rennes, 29 August
- Mart Poom – Sunderland, 15 November
- Marvin Robinson – Tranmere Rovers, 29 November
