= 2003–04 Derby County F.C. season =

Derby County
2003–04 season
- Chairman: (England) Lionel Pickering (until October) (England) John Sleightholme
- Manager: (Scotland) George Burley
- Stadium: Pride Park Stadium
- First Division: 20th
- FA Cup: Third round
- Carling Cup: First round
- Top goalscorer: League: Ian Taylor (11); All: Taylor (12)
- Average home league attendance: 22,199

During the 2003–04 English football season, Derby County F.C. competed in the First Division.

== Season summary ==
George Burley's first full season in charge brought little joy as Derby recorded a 20th-placed finish in the 2003–04 season, just 1 point clear of relegation with safety not confirmed until the penultimate game of the season with a 2–0 win over Millwall. With no money for players and the need to slash the club's wage bill, big names such as Fabrizio Ravanelli, Georgi Kinkladze and Craig Burley left the club with the gaps of their departure shored up by free signings; Candido Costa was taken on a season long loan whilst seven others – including Mathias Svensson and Leon Osman – were recruited on short term loans, as Derby used a club record 36 different players in the course of the season. There was also the continued introduction of academy players to the side, with Tom Huddlestone and Marcus Tudgay making significant contributions alongside players such as Lee Grant and Lee Holmes. Burley achieved safety against a background of boardroom uncertainty – Chairman Lionel Pickering, after putting temporary faith in former Coventry City chairman Bryan Richardson and a notional £30m bond, was removed from the chair after the club temporarily entered receivership by The Co-operative Bank, who instantly installed a new board composed of John Sleightholme, Jeremy Keith and Steve Harding, for the cost of £1 each.

== Final league table ==
Pos	Team	Pld	W	D	L	GF	GA	GD	Pts	Promotion, qualification or relegation
18	Crewe Alexandra	46	14	11	21	57	66	−9	53	
19	Burnley	46	13	14	19	60	77	−17	53	
20	Derby County	46	13	13	20	53	67	−14	52	
21	Gillingham	46	14	9	23	48	67	−19	51	
22	Walsall (R)	46	13	12	21	45	65	−20	51	Relegation to Football League One

Source: Soccerway
Rules for classification: 1) points; 2) goal difference; 3) number of goals scored.
(R) Relegated

== Results ==
Derby County's score comes first

=== Legend ===
Win	Draw	Loss

=== Football League First Division ===
Date	Opponent	Venue	Result	Attendance	Scorers
9 August 2003	Stoke City	H	0–3	21,517	
16 August 2003	Gillingham	A	0–0	7,850	
23 August 2003	Reading	H	2–3	18,970	Taylor (pen), Svensson
25 August 2003	Cardiff City	A	1–4	15,091	Svensson
30 August 2003	West Bromwich Albion	H	0–1	21,499	
13 September 2003	Walsall	A	1–0	8,726	Júnior
17 September 2003	Watford	H	3–2	18,459	Taylor, Svensson, Júnior
20 September 2003	Sunderland	H	1–1	22,535	Taylor
27 September 2003	Nottingham Forest	A	1–1	29,059	Júnior
30 September 2003	Bradford City	A	2–1	10,143	Morris (2)
4 October 2003	West Ham United	H	0–1	22,810	
11 October 2003	Wigan Athletic	H	2–2	19,151	Taylor (pen), Morris
14 October 2003	Crystal Palace	A	1–1	22,810	Zavagno
18 October 2003	Crewe Alexandra	A	0–3	8,656	
21 October 2003	Norwich City	A	1–2	16,346	Taylor (pen)
25 October 2003	Coventry City	H	1–3	21,641	Holmes
1 November 2003	Preston North End	A	0–3	12,839	
8 November 2003	Ipswich Town	H	2–2	19,976	Kennedy, Dichio
15 November 2003	Burnley	H	2–0	30,359	Morris, Taylor (pen)
22 November 2003	Millwall	A	0–0	10,308	
29 November 2003	Wimbledon	H	3–1	22,025	Herzig (own goal), Tudgay, Holmes
6 December 2003	Ipswich Town	A	1–2	25,018	Tudgay
13 December 2003	Rotherham United	A	0–0	7,320	
26 December 2003	West Bromwich Albion	A	1–1	26,412	Costa
28 December 2003	Norwich City	H	0–4	23,783	
10 January 2004	Stoke City	A	1–2	16,402	Morris
17 January 2004	Gillingham	H	2–1	20,473	Vincent, Edwards
28 January 2004	Sheffield United	H	2–0	26,603	Tudgay, McLeod
31 January 2004	Reading	A	1–3	14,382	Johnson
7 February 2004	Cardiff City	H	2–2	20,958	Taylor, Osman
14 February 2004	Wigan Athletic	A	0–2	9,146	
21 February 2004	Crystal Palace	H	2–1	21,856	Manel, Osman
28 February 2004	Coventry City	A	0–2	16,042	
3 March 2004	Crewe Alexandra	H	0–0	19,861	
13 March 2004	Rotherham United	H	1–0	21,741	Peschisolido
16 March 2004	Watford	A	1–2	13,931	Peschisolido
20 March 2004	Nottingham Forest	H	4–2	32,390	Taylor, Peschisolido (2), Tudgay
23 March 2004	Sheffield United	A	1–1	21,351	Taylor (pen)
27 March 2004	Sunderland	A	1–2	30,838	Taylor (pen)
3 April 2004	Walsall	H	0–1	23,574	
10 April 2004	West Ham United	A	0–0	28,207	
12 April 2004	Bradford City	H	3–2	21,593	Osman, Taylor, Combe (own goal)
17 April 2004	Preston North End	H	5–1	24,162	Manel (2), Tudgay (2), Júnior
24 April 2004	Burnley	A	0–1	16,189	
1 May 2004	Millwall	H	2–0	26,056	Bolder, Reich
9 May 2004	Wimbledon	A	0–1	6,509	

=== FA Cup ===
Round	Date	Opponent	Venue	Result	Attendance	Goalscorers
R3	3 January 2004	Ipswich Town	A	0–3	16,159	

=== League Cup ===
Round	Date	Opponent	Venue	Result	Attendance	Goalscorers
R1	13 August 2003	Huddersfield Town	A	1–2	6,672	Taylor

== Squad ==
Squad at end of season

Note: Flags indicate national team as defined under FIFA eligibility rules; some limited exceptions apply. Players may hold more than one non-FIFA nationality.

No.	Pos.	Nation	Player
1	GK	(England) ENG	Andy Oakes
2	DF	(Wales) WAL	Rob Edwards (Note: Edwards was born in Madeley, England, but also qualified to represent Wales internationally through his parents and made his international debut for Wales in March 2003.) (on loan from Aston Villa)
3	DF	(England) ENG	Jamie Vincent
4	DF	(England) ENG	Dave Walton
5	DF	(Republic of Ireland) IRL	Jeff Kenna
6	DF	(England) ENG	Pablo Mills
7	MF	(England) ENG	Ian Taylor (captain)
8	MF	(Portugal) POR	Cândido Costa (on loan from Porto)
9	FW	(Spain) ESP	Manel
10	DF	(Jamaica) JAM	Michael Johnson (Note: Johnson was born in Nottingham, England, but also qualified to represent Jamaica internationally and made his international debut for Jamaica in 1999.)
11	FW	(Canada) CAN	Paul Peschisolido
13	GK	(England) ENG	Lee Grant
14	DF	(England) ENG	Richard Jackson
15	MF	(England) ENG	Adam Bolder
16	DF	(France) FRA	Youl Mawéné
17	DF	(England) ENG	Paul Boertien

No.	Pos.	Nation	Player
18	FW	(England) ENG	Izale McLeod
19	MF	(England) ENG	Nathan Doyle
20	MF	(England) ENG	Lewis Hunt
21	MF	(Scotland) SCO	Gary Twigg
22	FW	(Germany) GER	Marco Reich
23	FW	(England) ENG	Marcus Tudgay
24	GK	(England) ENG	Lee Camp (Note: Camp was born in Derby, England, and represented them at U-21 level, but also qualifies to represent Northern Ireland internationally and would make his full international debut for Northern Ireland in March 2011.)
26	DF	(England) ENG	Chris Palmer
27	DF	(England) ENG	James Turner
28	MF	(Finland) FIN	Kris Weckström
29	DF	(England) ENG	Tom Huddlestone
30	MF	(England) ENG	Lee Holmes
31	FW	(Peru) PER	Gianfranco Labarthe
32	MF	(England) ENG	Leon Osman (on loan from Everton)
33	FW	(Brazil) BRA	José Júnior
34	FW	(England) ENG	Noel Whelan

=== Left club during season ===
Note: Flags indicate national team as defined under FIFA eligibility rules; some limited exceptions apply. Players may hold more than one non-FIFA nationality.

No.	Pos.	Nation	Player
2	DF	(England) ENG	Warren Barton (to Queens Park Rangers)
3	DF	(Argentina) ARG	Luciano Zavagno (to A.C. Ancona)
5	DF	(England) ENG	Steve Elliott (to Blackpool)
9	FW	(England) ENG	Lee Bradbury (on loan from Portsmouth)
9	FW	(England) ENG	Danny Dichio (on loan from West Bromwich Albion)
11	MF	(England) ENG	Lee Morris (to Leicester City)
12	MF	(Finland) FIN	Simo Valakari (to FC Dallas)

No.	Pos.	Nation	Player
22	MF	(England) ENG	Adam Murray (to Burton Albion)
22	FW	(England) ENG	Lee Bradbury (on loan from Portsmouth)
25	MF	(Republic of Ireland) IRL	Barry Molloy (to Drogheda United)
32	MF	(Scotland) SCO	Gary Caldwell (on loan from Newcastle United)
32	MF	(Northern Ireland) NIR	Peter Kennedy (on loan from Wigan Athletic)
34	FW	(Sweden) SWE	Mathias Svensson (on loan from Charlton Athletic)
