= Chris Riggott =

English footballer (born 1980)

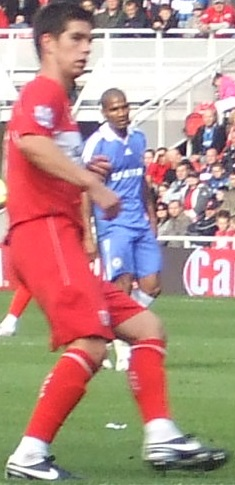
- Riggott playing for Middlesbrough in 2008

Personal information
- Full name: Christopher Mark Riggott
- Date of birth: 1 September 1980 (age 46)
- Place of birth: Derby, England
- Position: Defender

Senior career*
Years	Team	Apps	(Gls)
1999–2003	Derby County	91	(5)
2003–2010	Middlesbrough	104	(5)
2008	→ Stoke City (loan)	9	(0)
2010–2011	Cardiff City	2	(0)
2011–2012	Derby County	0	(0)
2012	Burton Albion	0	(0)
Total		206	(10)

International career
2000–2001	England U21	9	(0)
- * Club domestic league appearances and goals

Christopher Mark Riggott (born 1 September 1980) is an English former professional footballer who played as a defender. He began his career at Derby County, before moving to Middlesbrough, with whom he won the League Cup in 2004. He also had spells with Stoke City, Cardiff City and Burton Albion and represented England nine times at under-21 level.

== Career ==
=== Derby County ===
Born in Derby, Riggott played at Derby County where he came through the youth system, whilst studying at St Benedict's RC Secondary School in Derby. Whilst at Derby he was coached by future England manager Steve McClaren and Middlesbrough coaches Steve Round and Bill Beswick. He made his debut for the club on 14 May 2000 as a substitute in place of Steve Elliott during a 4–0 defeat to Chelsea. He went on to make 100 appearances for Derby in all competitions and scored 7 goals during his spell at the club. At the end of the 2000–01 season he was named Derby's Player of the Year.

=== Middlesbrough ===
After being strongly linked with Liverpool in the 2001–02 season, he eventually joined Middlesbrough, along with Malcolm Christie for a combined fee of 3 million pounds in January 2003, with the potential to rise to 5 million.

Riggott immediately became popular among the fans, scoring twice on his second appearance in the Tees-Wear derby against Sunderland at the Stadium of Light, which Middlesbrough won 3–1. He was also part of the 2004 League Cup final squad but did not play in the final. In the 2004–05 season he made 32 appearances, mostly covering for the much injured Ugo Ehiogu, contributing to the team's most successful season since the Premier League was established.

In the 2005–06 season, Riggott became the first choice central defensive partner for Gareth Southgate, in a successful season which saw the club reach the UEFA Cup final he stood out and was generally regarded as being one of the outstanding players for Middlesbrough during the season. In the UEFA Cup semi final against Steaua Bucharest, Boro found themselves 3–0 down on aggregate and needing four goals to get through to the final. Riggott crucially scored the third of the four needed as Middlesbrough miraculously reached the final.

The next season, new manager Southgate strengthened his defence by signing England and Germany internationals Jonathan Woodgate and Robert Huth, from Real Madrid and Chelsea respectively. This cast into doubt Riggot's place in the starting line up, and a series of injuries and the form of Middlesbrough's new defensive partnership of Woodgate and player of the year Emanuel Pogatetz limited his appearances that season. At some points he was even relegated to fourth choice centre-back, behind new signing Huth, who himself had injury problems. During the close season he was linked with a move to former club Derby, who had been promoted to the Premiership the previous season, but the rumours proved unfounded and he remained at Middlesbrough. Riggott joined Stoke City on loan on 29 February 2008, until the end of the season, in the hope of assisting the Potters in their promotion race, which he succeeded in doing. He returned to Middlesbrough on 2 May.

=== Cardiff City ===
Riggott decided against signing a new deal with the club, turning down a new contract. Middlesbrough manager Gordon Strachan later stated: "He wants to change his whole lift in terms of life, the club and the area he lives in. He's got great experience and he's had a rough time with injuries." Riggott spent time on trial at his former club Derby County but eventually joined Cardiff City on 17 September following a rigorous fitness test. On 26 December, Riggot made his long-awaited Cardiff City debut against Coventry City before coming off in the second half in his bid to regain full fitness. Cardiff City won the game 2–0. On 1 February, his contract at Cardiff was cancelled by mutual consent due to ongoing injuries.

=== Derby County ===
Ahead of the 2011–12 season, Riggott has been training with his hometown club Derby County in an attempt to regain fitness. He scored the only goal in a 2–1 pre-season friendly defeat at Crewe Alexandra, a game which was his sole appearance during his trial period. As was anticipated for much of pre-season, particularly after undergoing a back operation at Derby County's expense, Riggott signed a one-year contract with the club on 10 August 2011. However, he fell victim to his recurring injuries and didn't play football again until mid-November, when he appeared in a reserve fixture against Sheffield United. On 22 December 2011, Riggott left Derby as his contract was cancelled by mutual consent, the contract was formally terminated on 1 January 2012.

=== Burton Albion ===
After training with them for a week, Riggott joined Burton Albion on 9 February 2012 on a short-term deal. The contract ran until the end of the 2011–12 season. However, he never made an appearance for the club and was forced to retire from the game on 20 March 2012, after failing to overcome a persistent back injury.

== Career statistics ==
Appearances and goals by club, season and competition
Club	Season	League			FA Cup		League Cup		Europe		Total	
Club	Season	Division	Apps	Goals	Apps	Goals	Apps	Goals	Apps	Goals	Apps	Goals
Derby County	1999–2000	Premier League	1	0	0	0	0	0	—		1	0
Derby County	2000–01	Premier League	31	3	2	1	3	1	—		36	5
Derby County	2001–02	Premier League	37	0	0	0	2	0	—		39	0
Derby County	2002–03	First Division	22	2	0	0	2	0	—		24	2
Derby County	Total		91	5	2	1	7	1	—		100	7
Middlesbrough	2002–03	Premier League	5	2	0	0	0	0	—		5	2
Middlesbrough	2003–04	Premier League	17	0	2	0	5	0	—		24	0
Middlesbrough	2004–05	Premier League	21	2	1	0	2	0	8 (Note: Appearances in UEFA Cup)	1	32	3
Middlesbrough	2005–06	Premier League	22	0	5	1	2	0	13	1	42	2
Middlesbrough	2006–07	Premier League	6	0	1	0	0	0	—		7	0
Middlesbrough	2007–08	Premier League	10	1	0	0	1	0	—		11	1
Middlesbrough	2008–09	Premier League	17	0	1	0	2	0	—		20	0
Middlesbrough	2009–10	Championship	6	0	1	0	0	0	—		7	0
Middlesbrough	Total		104	5	11	1	12	0	21	2	148	8
Stoke City (loan)	2007–08	Championship	9	0	0	0	0	0	—		9	0
Cardiff City	2010–11	Championship	2	0	0	0	0	0	—		2	0
Derby County	2011–12	Championship	0	0	0	0	0	0	—		0	0
Burton Albion	2011–12	League Two	0	0	0	0	0	0	0	0	0	0
Career total			206	10	13	2	19	1	21	2	259	15

== Honours ==
Middlesbrough

- Football League Cup: 2003–04
- UEFA Cup runner-up: 2005–06
