= Þórður Guðjónsson =

Icelandic footballer

Þórður Gudjonsson
Personal information
- Date of birth: 14 October 1973 (age 53)
- Place of birth: Akranes, Iceland
- Height: 1.78 m (5 ft 10 in)
- Positions: Midfielder; striker

Senior career*
Years	Team	Apps	(Gls)
1990	KA Akureyri	16	(2)
1991–1993	ÍA Akranes	53	(36)
1993–1997	VfL Bochum	73	(10)
1997–2000	Genk	92	(27)
2000–2002	Las Palmas	8	(1)
2001	→ Derby County (loan)	10	(1)
2002	→ Preston North End (loan)	7	(0)
2002–2005	VfL Bochum	44	(3)
2005–2006	Stoke City	2	(0)
2006–2008	ÍA Akranes	43	(5)
Total		348	(85)

International career
1989	Iceland U17	10	(7)
1989–1993	Iceland U19	14	(6)
1992–1995	Iceland U21	10	(3)
1993–2004	Iceland	58	(13)
- * Club domestic league appearances and goals

Þórður "Thordur" Gudjonsson (born 14 October 1973) is an Icelandic former professional footballer who played as a midfielder or striker.

== Club career ==
Þórður was born in Akranes started his career with local teams KA Akureyri and ÍA Akranes, and moved to German team VfL Bochum in 1993. He spent four years at Bochum before moving to Belgium side Genk in 1997. He stayed at Genk for three seasons until in 2000 he moved to Spanish side Las Palmas, but saw limited playing action and was loaned out to English Premier League club Derby County in March 2001. At Derby he played ten league matches for the club in 2000–01 and scored once in the league against West Ham United. In 2001–02, he played eight matches for Preston North End before making a return to Bochum in 2002. He remained at Bochum until January 2005 when he joined Stoke City. His brother Bjarni and father Gudjon had both played and managed Stoke City respectively. He managed just two substitute appearances towards the end of the 2004–05 season and after playing just once in the League Cup in 2005–06 he returned to Iceland with ÍA Akranes.

== International career ==
Þórður made his debut for Iceland in a September 1993 World Cup qualifier against Luxembourg. He went on to earn 58 caps, scoring 13 goals for the national team.

== Personal life ==
Þórður's father Gudjon and brothers, Bjarni, Joey and their half brother Bjorn Sigurdarson have all been involved with professional football.

He retired in 2008 to take up politics.

== Career statistics ==
=== Club ===
Appearances and goals by club, season and competition
Club	Season	League			FA Cup		League Cup		Total	
Club	Season	Division	Apps	Goals	Apps	Goals	Apps	Goals	Apps	Goals
KA Akureyri	1990	Úrvalsdeild	16	2	—		—		16	2
ÍA Akranes	1991	1. deild karla	17	11	—		—		17	11
ÍA Akranes	1992	Úrvalsdeild	18	6	—		—		18	6
ÍA Akranes	1993	Úrvalsdeild	18	19	—		—		18	19
ÍA Akranes	Total		53	36	—		—		53	36
VfL Bochum	1993–94	2. Bundesliga	16	3	—		—		16	3
VfL Bochum	1994–95	Bundesliga	16	3	—		—		16	3
VfL Bochum	1995–96	2. Bundesliga	28	3	—		—		28	3
VfL Bochum	1996–97	Bundesliga	13	1	—		—		13	1
VfL Bochum	Total		73	10	—		—		73	10
Genk	1997–98	Belgian First Division	33	9	—		—		33	9
Genk	1998–99	Belgian First Division	28	9	—		—		28	9
Genk	1999–2000	Belgian First Division	31	9	—		—		31	9
Genk	Total		92	27	—		—		92	27
Las Palmas	2000–01	La Liga	8	1	—		—		8	1
Derby County	2000–01	Premier League	10	1	0	0	0	0	10	1
Preston North End	2001–02	First Division	7	0	1	0	0	0	8	0
VfL Bochum	2002–03	Bundesliga	29	3	—		—		29	3
VfL Bochum	2003–04	Bundesliga	12	0	—		—		12	0
VfL Bochum	2004–05	Bundesliga	3	0	—		—		3	0
VfL Bochum	Total		44	3	—		—		44	3
Stoke City	2004–05	Championship	2	0	0	0	0	0	2	0
Stoke City	2005–06	Championship	0	0	0	0	1	0	1	0
Stoke City	Total		2	0	0	0	1	0	3	0
ÍA Akranes	2006	Úrvalsdeild	13	1	—		—		13	1
ÍA Akranes	2007	Úrvalsdeild	11	4	—		—		11	4
ÍA Akranes	2008	Úrvalsdeild	19	0	—		—		19	0
ÍA Akranes	Total		43	5	—		—		43	5
Career total			348	85	1	0	1	0	350	86

=== International ===
Appearances and goals by national team and year
National team	Year	Apps	Goals
Iceland	1993	2	0
Iceland	1994	1	1
Iceland	1996	9	1
Iceland	1997	7	1
Iceland	1998	7	3
Iceland	1999	9	3
Iceland	2000	5	1
Iceland	2001	2	1
Iceland	2002	1	0
Iceland	2003	6	1
Iceland	2004	9	1
Total		58	13

Scores and results list Iceland's goal tally first, score column indicates score after each Guðjónsson goal.

List of international goals scored by Þórður Guðjónsson
No.	Date	Venue	Opponent	Score	Result	Competition	Ref.
1	16 August 1994	Akureyrarvöllur, Akureyri, Iceland	Estonia	4–0	4–0	Friendly	
2	4 September 1996	Stadion Střelnice, Jablonec nad Nisou, Czech Republic	Czech Republic	1–0	1–2	Friendly	
3	11 October 1997	Laugardalsvöllur, Reykjavík, Iceland	Liechtenstein	1–0	4–0	1998 FIFA World Cup qualification	
4	5 February 1998	Tsirio Stadium, Limassol, Cyprus	Slovenia	2–3	2–3	Friendly	
5	19 August 1998	Laugardalsvöllur, Reykjavík, Iceland	Latvia	1–1	4–1	Friendly	
6	19 August 1998	Laugardalsvöllur, Reykjavík, Iceland	Latvia	2–1	4–1	Friendly	
7	28 April 1999	National Stadium, Ta' Qali, Malta	Malta	1–0	2–1	Friendly	
8	18 August 1999	Tórsvøllur, Tórshavn, Faroe Islands	Faroe Islands	1–0	1–0	Friendly	
9	4 September 1999	Laugardalsvöllur, Reykjavík, Iceland	Andorra	1–0	3–0	UEFA Euro 2000 qualifying	
10	11 October 2000	Laugardalsvöllur, Reykjavík, Iceland	Northern Ireland	1–0	1–0	2002 FIFA World Cup qualification	
11	25 April 2001	National Stadium, Ta' Qali, Malta	Malta	4–1	4–1	2002 FIFA World Cup qualification	
12	11 June 2003	Darius and Girėnas Stadium, Kaunas, Lithuania	Lithuania	1–0	3–0	UEFA Euro 2004 qualifying	
13	31 March 2004	Arena Kombëtare, Tirana, Albania	Albania	1–1	1–2	Friendly	

== Honours ==
Genk

- Belgian First Division: 1998–99
- Belgian Cup: 1997–98, 1999–2000
