= Marvin Robinson (footballer) =

English footballer (born 1980)

Personal information
- Full name: Marvin Leon St Clair Robinson
- Date of birth: 11 April 1980 (age 46)
- Place of birth: Crewe, England
- Position: Striker

Team information
- Current team: Hednesford Town (assistant manager)

Senior career*
Years	Team	Apps	(Gls)
1998–2003	Derby County	12	(1)
2000	→ Stoke City (loan)	3	(1)
2002–2003	→ Tranmere Rovers (loan)	6	(1)
2003–2004	Chesterfield	32	(6)
2004	Notts County	2	(0)
2004	Rushden & Diamonds	2	(0)
2004–2005	Walsall	10	(4)
2005	Stockport County	3	(0)
2005–2006	Lincoln City	32	(7)
2006	Macclesfield Town	5	(0)
2006–2008	Oxford United	30	(3)
2007	→ Cambridge United (loan)	4	(1)
2008–2009	Kettering Town		
2008–2009	Redditch United		
2009–2010	Nantwich Town	19	(7)
2010–2012	Hednesford Town		
2012–2013	Brackley Town	35	(4)
2013	→ Leamington (loan)		
2013	Oxford City	7	(1)
2014–2015	Hednesford Town	55	(11)
2015–2016	Stafford Rangers		
2017	→ Stafford Town (loan)	2	(2)
2017	→ Sporting Khalsa (loan)	3	(0)
2017	Hednesford Town		
2016–2017	A.F.C. Wulfrunians	11	(4)
- * Club domestic league appearances and goals

Marvin Leon St.Clair Robinson (born 11 April 1980) is an English former professional footballer who is the CEO of Hednesford Town.

== Career ==
Robinson was born in Crewe, and went to school at Wolverhampton Grammar School from 1991 to 1998. While there, he represented England U18 schoolboys. He signed professional terms with Premier League side Derby County in June 1998 and made his debut against Arsenal at Highbury in April 1999. Later that year, he made his full league debut against Manchester United in a 2–1 defeat.

In September 2000, Robinson joined Stoke City on loan for the 2000–01 season. He scored on his debut in a 4–0 win over Oxford United, and played the full match in a 1–1 draw with Port Vale in the Potteries derby. However, in his third match, against Rotherham United, he collided with Rotherham goalkeeper Ian Gray and suffered a broken leg.

In 2002 Robinson returned from injury to score against Sunderland in the 2001–02 season. After spending time out on loan at Tranmere Rovers, scoring once against QPR, Robinson began to forge a career typical of 'journeyman' players, moving from club to club regularly. He had short spells with Chesterfield, Notts County, Rushden & Diamonds (where he scored on his debut in the FA Cup against Bradford City), Walsall, Stockport County, Lincoln City and Macclesfield Town before signing for Oxford United in September 2006.

At Oxford, Robinson was given many opportunities to prove himself, but suffered a loss of form and failed to make a positive impression at the club. In September 2007, he went out on loan to Cambridge United. On 14 October 2007, while on loan to Cambridge United, Robinson suffered a broken leg and bruised lungs in a car crash. As a result of this, Oxford United terminated his loan with Cambridge so he could recover at Oxford. To aid his recovery, Robinson began training with Kettering Town and appeared for the club in a 5–1 Northants Hillier Senior Cup defeat at Daventry Town on 11 November 2008, the Kettering goal coming courtesy of their chairman Imraan Ladak. After a second, and final, appearance for the club in a 3–2 Conference League Cup defeat to A.F.C. Telford United on 20 January 2009, he joined Redditch United. After making his debut for the club in a 4–0 home defeat to Droylsden on 24 January 2009, he scored his first goal for the club in the following Saturday's game, a 2–1 victory at Hyde United.

Robinson started the 2009–2010 season with Massey Ferguson, netting 13 goals in the Midland Combination Premier Division before signing for Northern Premier League side Nantwich Town in December 2009 on a free transfer. He scored 9 goals in his first 9 league and cup games for Nantwich, finishing the season with a total of 11 goals.

In October 2010, he joined Hednesford Town, making his debut for the Pitmen in the 2–1 FA Trophy defeat against Whitby Town at Keys Park on 16 October 2010. On his second appearance for the club, he scored four goals in the club's record 9–0 win over Weymouth.

Robinson moved to Brackley Town in the summer of 2012, and scored 4 goals in 35 appearances for the club in a year-long stint which also included a loan at Leamington early in 2013, before joining Oxford City in 2013.

His time at Oxford City was short; Robinson scored 1 goal in 7 appearances, before returning to Hednesford Town late in 2013. In November 2015 he moved on to join Stafford Rangers, debuting as a substitute in the club's Northern Premier League Division One South 2–0 victory at Loughborough Dynamo on 21 November 2015. In January 2016 he joined Stafford Town on loan, scoring both on his debut in the club's 2–1 home Midland Football League League One victory against Atherstone Town on 23 January 2016 and in his second, and final, match for the club: a 1–1 draw at home to Pilkington XXX one week later. He moved on to join Sporting Khalsa on loan, making his first appearance for the club in their 1–3 home loss to Heanor Town on 13 February 2016. He returned to Hednesford Town on a permanent basis from Stafford Rangers in March 2016, making his latest debut for the club as a late substitute in the 2–2 draw at Gloucester City on 5 March 2016. He joined A.F.C. Wulfrunians for the 2016–17 season, scoring twice on his debut in the 2-0 Midland League Premier Division victory at home to Boldmere St. Michaels on 13 August 2016. He played 16 times for the club scoring five times, 11 times in the league with four goals, before returning to Hednesford Town as First Team Coach in February 2017. In March, the club appointed Gary Birch to the manager role on a permanent basis, with Robinson appointed his assistant.

== Career statistics ==
Appearances and goals by club, season and competition
Club	Season	League			FA Cup		League Cup		Other (Note: Includes Football League Trophy.)		Total	
Club	Season	Division	Apps	Goals	Apps	Goals	Apps	Goals	Apps	Goals	Apps	Goals
Derby County	1998–99	Premier League	1	0	0	0	0	0	0	0	1	0
Derby County	1999–2000	Premier League	8	0	0	0	0	0	0	0	8	0
Derby County	2000–01	Premier League	0	0	0	0	0	0	0	0	0	0
Derby County	2001–02	Premier League	2	1	0	0	0	0	0	0	2	1
Derby County	2002–03	First Division	1	0	0	0	0	0	0	0	1	0
Stoke City (loan)	2000–01	Second Division	3	1	0	0	0	0	0	0	3	1
Tranmere Rovers (loan)	2002–03	Second Division	6	1	0	0	0	0	1	0	7	1
Chesterfield	2003–04	Second Division	32	6	1	0	0	0	2	1	35	7
Notts County	2004–05	League Two	2	0	0	0	0	0	0	0	2	0
Rushden & Diamonds	2004–05	League Two	2	0	2	1	0	0	0	0	4	1
Walsall	2004–05	League Two	10	4	0	0	0	0	0	0	10	4
Stockport County	2004–05	League One	3	0	0	0	0	0	0	0	3	0
Lincoln City	2005–06	League Two	22	7	2	1	2	2	1	0	27	10
Macclesfield Town	2006–07	League Two	5	0	0	0	1	0	0	0	6	0
Oxford United	2007–08	Conference National	21	3	0	0	0	0	0	0	21	3
Oxford United	2008–09	Conference National	9	0	0	0	0	0	0	0	9	0
Cambridge United (loan)	2008–09	Conference National	4	1	0	0	0	0	0	0	4	1
Career total			131	24	5	2	3	2	4	1	143	29
