= Andy Oakes (footballer) =

English footballer (born 1977)

Personal information
- Full name: Andrew Mark Oakes
- Date of birth: 11 January 1977 (age 49)
- Place of birth: Northwich, England
- Height: 6 ft 1 in (1.85 m)
- Position: Goalkeeper

Youth career
- 1993–1995: Burnley

Senior career*
Years	Team	Apps	(Gls)
1995–1996	Witton Albion		
1996–1997	Barnton		
1997	Macclesfield Town	0	(0)
1997–1998	Winsford United		
1998–1999	Hull City	19	(0)
1999–2005	Derby County	43	(0)
1999	→ Port Vale (loan)	0	(0)
2004–2005	→ Bolton Wanderers (loan)	1	(0)
2005–2006	Walsall	34	(0)
2006–2007	Swansea City	5	(0)
2007–2009	Darlington	16	(0)

International career
1994	England U17	1	(0)
- * Club domestic league appearances and goals

Andrew Mark Oakes (born 11 January 1977) is an English former football goalkeeper.

He spent his early years at Macclesfield Town and Winsford United, before playing for Hull City in 1998–99. He was then signed by Premier League side Derby County for £465,000. He spent six years at Pride Park as a backup keeper and also spent brief spells on loan at Port Vale and Bolton Wanderers. He signed with Walsall in March 2005 before moving on to Swansea City in August 2006. He signed with Darlington in May 2007 before leaving the game two years later.

== Career ==
In May 1993, Oakes joined Burnley's youth training scheme, but was released when his two-year apprenticeship ended. In April 1994, Oakes made his only appearance for England under-17s, playing against an English Schools' Football Association representative side. In August 1996, Oakes joined his hometown club Barnton in the Mid-Cheshire League, where he established himself as a regular first-team goalkeeper. He joined Macclesfield Town in the 1996–97 season as cover for regular goalkeeper Ryan Price as the club battled towards promotion into the Football League. Oakes played once for the "Silkmen", in a 2–0 FA Cup defeat to Rochdale, where he reportedly played with a broken finger after an unexpected callup. After the season finished he moved on to Northern Premier League side Winsford United. Oakes' performances for Winsford United in 1997–98 attracted attention after he conceded very few goals and saved two penalties in his first seven starts.

In December 1998, he returned to the Football League when he signed with Third Division club Hull City for a small fee, with Winsford retaining a 25% sell-on clause. Oakes' performances for Winsford United attracted the attention of Hull City manager Warren Joyce, who had previously known him from his time as a Burnley apprentice. Oakes established himself as Hull's first-choice goalkeeper during the club's successful fight against relegation in the second half of the 1998–99 season, replacing Steve Wilson. He played twenty games and his performances at Boothferry Park earned him a £465,000 move to Premier League side Derby County in June 1999. He immediately went out on loan with Port Vale but returned to Pride Park within three weeks having failed to make an appearance for Brian Horton's "Valiants".

He made his Derby debut against Sunderland in February 2001, keeping a clean sheet. He was the understudy to Mart Poom before becoming the first-choice keeper in 2001–02, playing 22 games. He had lost his first-team place when manager Jim Smith resigned in October 2001. He won back his place when Colin Todd was sacked and replaced by John Gregory in January. The "Rams" were relegated at the end of the season, finishing ten points behind 17th place Sunderland. Teenager Lee Grant was favoured more in 2002–03, and Oakes was restricted to seven First Division appearances. He played ten games in 2003–04, as Grant continued to be favoured by new boss George Burley. Grant was dropped in 2004–05, only for 20-year-old Lee Camp to claim the first-team jersey. Oakes joined Bolton Wanderers on loan at the start of the 2004–05 season as back-up to Jussi Jääskeläinen, but only made the one appearance.

He moved on to Paul Merson's Walsall on a free transfer in March 2005, and featured in the last nine games of the campaign. He played 30 games in 2005–06, having missed September to December. With the "Saddlers" suffering relegation, he was released from the Bescot Stadium in May 2006. He signed with Kenny Jackett's Swansea City in August 2006. Playing six games of the 2006–07 season, with only one appearances coming at the Liberty Stadium, he was not offered a new contract in the summer by new boss Roberto Martínez. Oakes signed with Darlington in May 2007. He made 18 appearances for Dave Penney's "Quakers", before retiring from the game in 2009.

== Career statistics ==
Appearances and goals by club, season and competition
Club	Season	League			FA Cup		League Cup		Other		Total	
Club	Season	Division	Apps	Goals	Apps	Goals	Apps	Goals	Apps	Goals	Apps	Goals
Macclesfield Town	1997–98	Conference	0	0	1	0	—		0	0	1	0
Hull City	1998–99	Third Division	19	0	0	0	0	0	1 (Note: Appearance(s) in the EFL Trophy.)	0	20	0
Derby County	1999–2000	Premier League	0	0	0	0	0	0	—		0	0
Derby County	2000–01	Premier League	6	0	1	0	0	0	—		7	0
Derby County	2001–02	Premier League	20	0	0	0	2	0	—		22	0
Derby County	2002–03	First Division	7	0	0	0	0	0	—		7	0
Derby County	2003–04	First Division	10	0	0	0	0	0	—		10	0
Derby County	2004–05	Championship	0	0	0	0	0	0	—		0	0
Derby County	Total		43	0	1	0	2	0	0	0	46	0
Port Vale (loan)	1999–2000	First Division	0	0	0	0	0	0	—		0	0
Bolton Wanderers (loan)	2004–05	Premier League	1	0	0	0	0	0	—		1	0
Walsall	2004–05	League One	9	0	0	0	0	0	0	0	9	0
Walsall	2005–06	League One	25	0	3	0	1	0	1	0	30	0
Walsall	Total		34	0	3	0	1	0	1	0	39	0
Swansea City	2006–07	League One	5	0	0	0	0	0	1	0	6	0
Darlington	2007–08	League Two	6	0	0	0	0	0	1	0	7	0
Darlington	2008–09	League Two	10	0	1	0	0	0	0	0	11	0
Darlington	Total		16	0	1	0	0	0	1	0	18	0
Career total (Note: Statistics for Winsford United not recorded.)			118	0	6	0	3	0	4	0	131	0
