= Patrick Foletti =

Swiss footballer (born 1974)

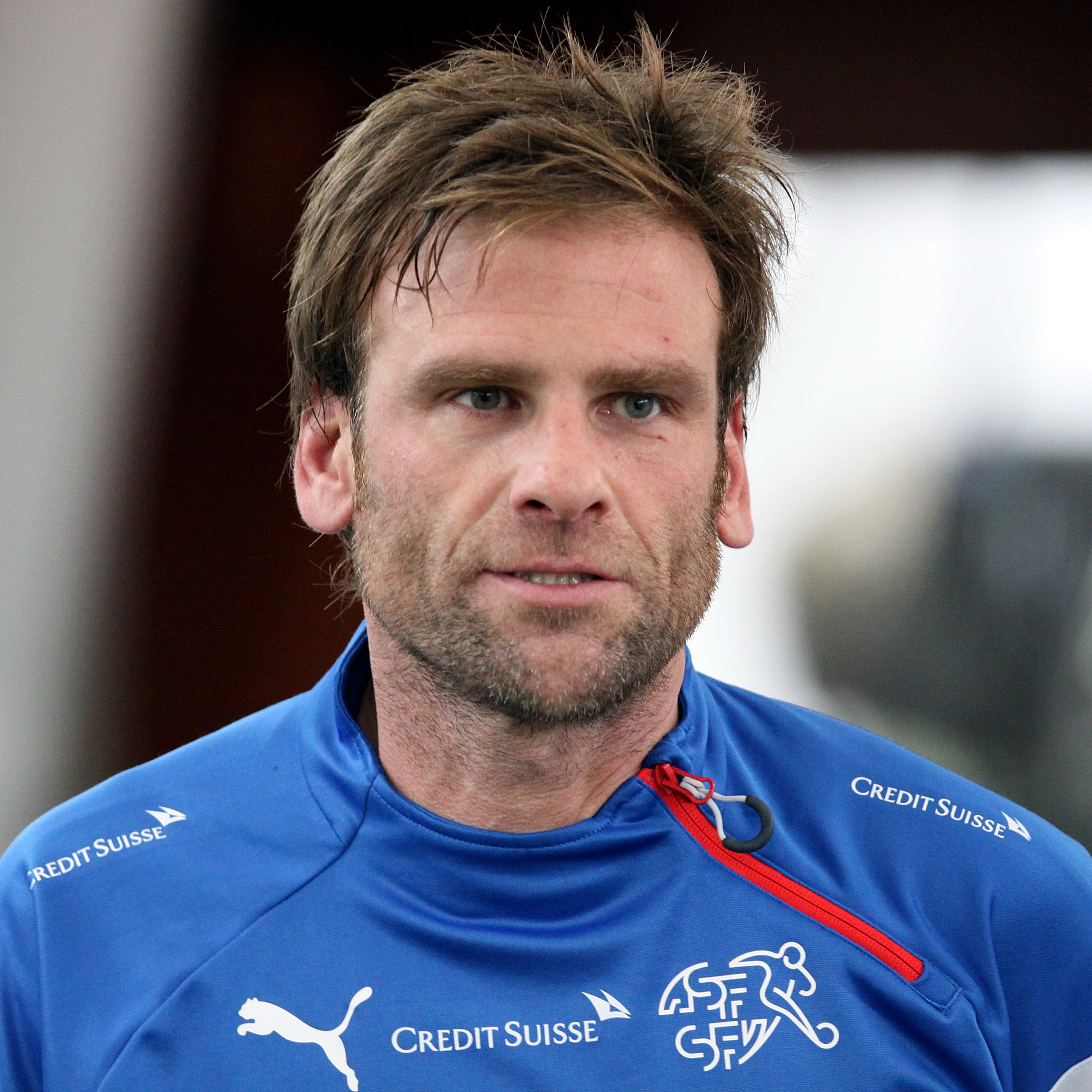
- Foletti in 2015

Personal information
- Date of birth: 27 May 1974 (age 52)
- Place of birth: Mendrisio, Switzerland
- Height: 1.87 m (6 ft 2 in)
- Position: Goalkeeper

Team information
- Current team: Switzerland (goalkeeper coach)

Youth career
- AC Coldrerio
- Mendrisio

Senior career*
| Years | Team | Apps | (Gls) |
| 1990–1994 | Mendrisio | | |
| 1994–1997 | Grasshoppers | 11 | (0) |
| 1997–1999 | FC Schaffhausen | | |
| 1999–2002 | FC Luzern | 76 | (0) |
| 2002 | → Derby County (loan) | 2 | (0) |
| 2002–2007 | SC Kriens | 70 | (0) |

Managerial career
- 2007–2008: FC Luzern (goalkeeper coach)
- 2008–2011: Grasshoppers (goalkeeper coach)
- 2011–: Switzerland (goalkeeper coach)
- * Club domestic league appearances and goals

Patrick Foletti (born 27 May 1974) is a Swiss former goalkeeper who currently works as a goalkeeper coach for the Switzerland national football team.

== Club career ==
Foletti started his professional career in his hometown at Mendrisio before moving to Grasshoppers, where he was mainly a substitute. During his tenure, he started 3 UEFA Champions League matches in 1995.

He moved to FC Schaffhausen in 1997 and later to FC Luzern in 1999, where he was a starter. In 2002, after a shortage of goalkeepers at Derby County, he was brought in on loan and appeared twice, first coming off the bench for the injured Andy Oakes in a 3–0 win vs Leicester City and playing the whole match in a 3–4 loss against Everton exactly one month later.

Foletti moved back to Switzerland in the following season, joining SC Kriens where he played until his retirement in 2007.

== Coaching career ==
Foletti has worked as a goalkeeper coach after ending his playing career. His first club was FC Luzern in 2007, then moving Grasshoppers the next year. He stayed with the club until 2011, when he was assigned the goalkeeping coach duty at Switzerland national team working both with senior and youth sides.
