= James Wall (footballer) =

English footballer

Personal information
- Full name: James Thomas Wall
- Date of birth: 21 March 1980 (age 46)
- Place of birth: Carshalton, England
- Position: Defender

Youth career
- Derby County

Senior career*
Years	Team	Apps	(Gls)
1999–2001	Hereford United	24	(1)
1999–2000	→ Burton Albion (loan)		
2001	Nashville Metros	24	(1)
2001–2002	Burton Albion		
2002	Atlanta Silverbacks	18	(1)
- * Club domestic league appearances and goals

James Wall is an English retired association football defender who played professionally in England and the United States.

In July 1999, Wall signed with Hereford United on a free transfer from Derby County F.C. where he had spent his youth years. He played fourteen games for Hereford, scoring one goal, in his first season, but went on loan to Burton Albion for nine games. On 6 April 2001, Wall transferred to the Nashville Metros of the USL A-League. He was Second Team All League that season. In August 2001, Wall was back with Burton Albion. On 7 December 2001, Wall signed a three-year contract with the Atlanta Silverbacks. The Silverbacks released him before the 2003 season.

After football James became a proficient player of snap and is often seen on late night trains in his role as quizmaster.
