= Mart Poom =

Estonian footballer (born 1972)

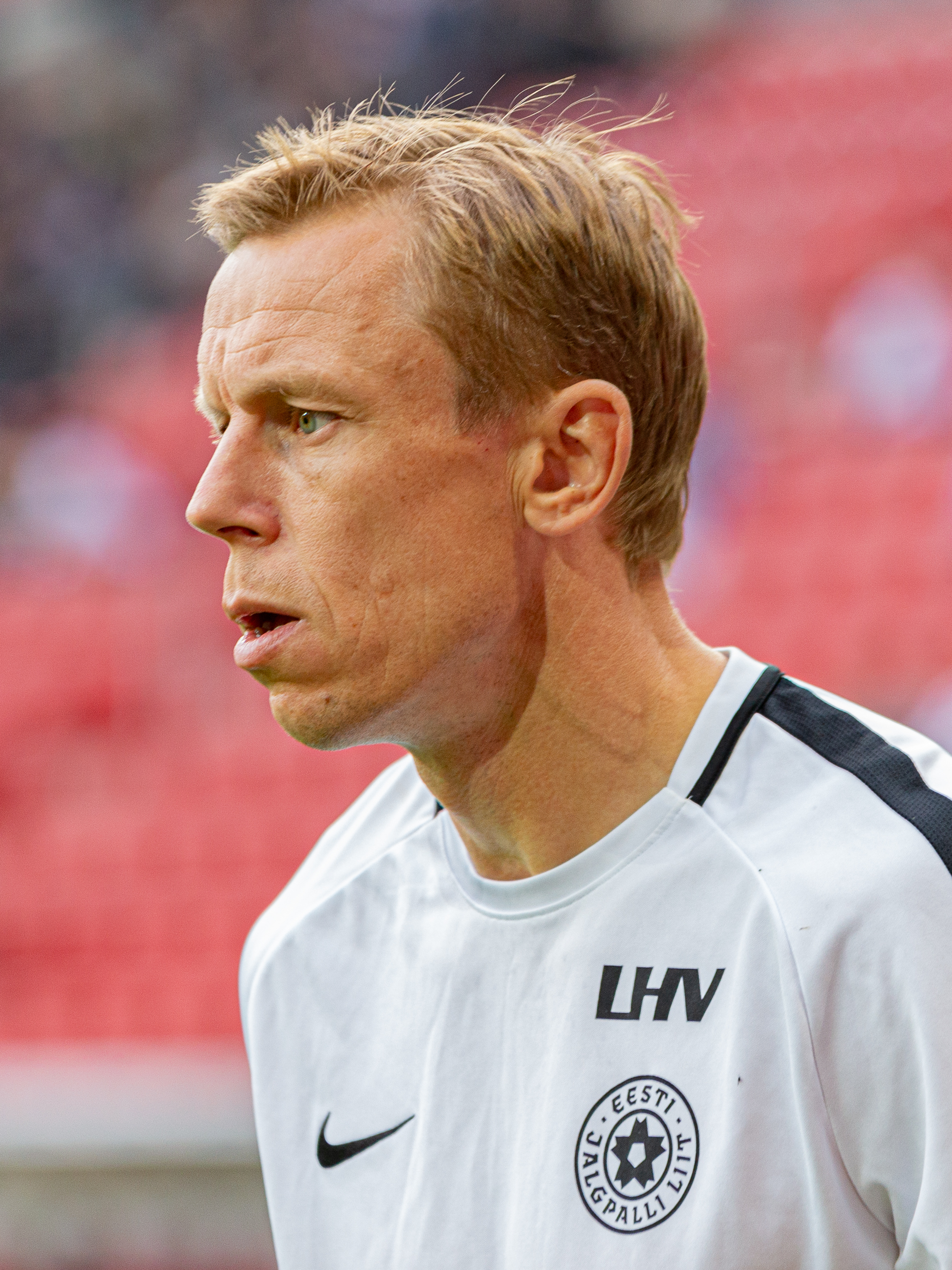
- Poom with Estonia in 2019

Personal information
- Full name: Mart Aro Poom
- Date of birth: 3 February 1972 (age 54)
- Place of birth: Tallinn, then part of Estonian SSR, Soviet Union
- Height: 1.94 m (6 ft 4 in)
- Position: Goalkeeper

Youth career
- 1979–1989: Lõvid

Senior career*
Years	Team	Apps	(Gls)
1988	Lõvid/Flora	20	(0)
1989–1990	Sport Tallinn	59	(0)
1992	KuPS	9	(0)
1992–1993	Flora	22	(0)
1993–1994	Wil	13	(0)
1994–1997	Portsmouth	4	(0)
1995–1997	→ Flora (loan)	19	(0)
1997–2003	Derby County	146	(0)
2002–2003	→ Sunderland (loan)	0	(0)
2003–2006	Sunderland	58	(1)
2005–2006	→ Arsenal (loan)	0	(0)
2006–2007	Arsenal	1	(0)
2007–2009	Watford	19	(0)
Total		370	(1)

International career
1991–2009	Estonia	122	(0)
- * Club domestic league appearances and goals

Mart Aro Poom (born 3 February 1972) is an Estonian football coach and former professional player who is regarded as one of the greatest Estonian footballers of all time. He is the goalkeeping coach of the Estonia national team.

Poom played as a goalkeeper for Lõvid, Sport Tallinn, KuPS, Flora, Wil, Portsmouth, Derby County, Sunderland, Arsenal, and Watford. Poom made his international debut on 3 June 1992 in the Estonia national team's first official match since restoration of independence, a 1–1 draw against Slovenia in a friendly. He made a total of 120 appearances for Estonia and was the team's captain. Poom won the Estonian Footballer of the Year award six times, in 1993, 1994, 1997, 1998, 2000 and 2003, the second highest number of times won, behind only Ragnar Klavan. In November 2003, Poom was named Estonia's Golden Player. He ended his career on 10 June 2009, after a 0–0 draw against Portugal.

== Early life ==
Mart Aro Poom was born on 3 February 1972 in Tallinn, and grew up in Mustamäe. He graduated from the Tallinn Secondary School No. 49 with a gold medal and enrolled at the Tallinn University of Technology, but did not finish his studies, focusing on football.

== Club career ==
=== Early career ===
Poom started playing football with Tallinna Lõvid (English: Lions of Tallinn), before moving to Soviet Second League club Sport Tallinn in 1989.

=== KuPS ===
In 1992, Poom joined Finnish Veikkausliiga club KuPS. He played only 9 games in Finland, before returning to Estonia.

=== Flora ===
Back in Estonia, Poom and signed for Meistriliiga club Flora, the successor of the Lõvid team.

=== Wil ===
On 1 August 1993, Poom left Flora and joined Nationalliga B side Wil for a reported transfer fee of £128,000.

=== Portsmouth ===
On 4 August 1994, Poom moved to England and signed for First Division side Portsmouth for a reported transfer fee of £170,000. He made four league appearances for Portsmouth.

==== Flora (loan) ====
In 1995, Poom joined his former club Flora on loan, where he broke the club record by keeping a clean sheet for 756 minutes.

=== Derby County ===
On 26 March 1997, Poom joined Derby County for a reported transfer fee of £595,000, following a strong performance for Estonia (a 0–0 draw against Scotland, in a rearranged match played in Monaco). He made his Premier League debut on 5 April 1997, against Manchester United in Derby's 3–2 away win at Old Trafford, becoming the first player from Estonia to play in the PL. Poom soon became a fan favourite, with supporters often confusing unfamiliar commentators with a low chant of 'Pooooom' before games, which sounded like booing. Poom was named Derby County's Player of the Year in the 1999–2000 season and in 2022, the best footballer of the 2000s decade by Derby County

=== Sunderland ===
On 18 November 2002, following Derby County's relegation to the First Division in the 2001–02 season, Poom joined Sunderland on loan. The move was made permanent on 10 January 2003, for a fee of £3.19 million. On 20 September 2003, he headed a 90th-minute equaliser for Sunderland against Derby County at Pride Park. This was described as "the best goal ever scored by a goalkeeper in the 90th minute on his first match against his former club" by the commentator. The goal was cheered by both sets of fans. Poom's career in Sunderland was beset by several injuries, and he was forced to spend much of the 2004–05 season on the sidelines, making 11 league appearances as Sunderland won the 2004–05 Football League Championship.

=== Arsenal ===
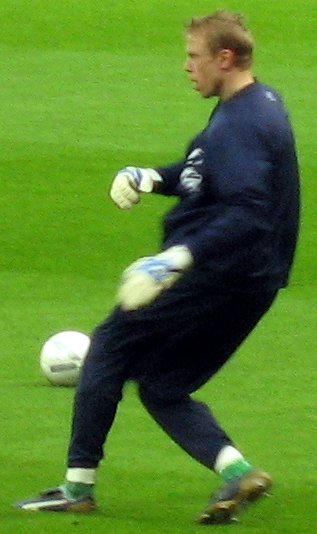
Poom warming up prior to a match against Bolton Wanderers in January 2007

On 31 August 2005, Poom was signed by Arsenal on loan as temporary cover for Jens Lehmann and Manuel Almunia. The move was made permanent on 23 January 2006. He was Arsenal's third-choice keeper, and did not play a single match in the 2005–06 season. However, he became the first Estonian to receive a Champions League runners-up medal after Arsenal lost to Barcelona in the 2006 UEFA Champions League Final. Poom did not play nor did he make the substitutes' bench for the final, but was in Arsenal's 25-man European squad, each of whom won a silver medal.

He made his debut for Arsenal on 8 November 2006 in a League Cup match against Everton, replacing the injured Manuel Almunia at half-time. Arsenal won the match 1–0 from an Emmanuel Adebayor goal. His first and only appearance for Arsenal in the Premier League, came on the last day of the 2006–07 season, against his former club, Portsmouth, in a 0–0 draw.

=== Watford ===
On 26 May 2007, Poom signed for Watford, who had recently been relegated from the Premier League, for an undisclosed fee. He started the new season as Watford's first choice, but went on to lose his place to Richard Lee.

Poom returned to the side for the start of the 2008–09 season, but sustained a dislocated shoulder in a game against Reading on 20 September 2008 that ruled him out for the majority of the season. Although he returned to training before the end of the season, he was not considered for the first-team squad and he was released from his contract, which was due to end in June, on 30 April 2009.

== International career ==
Poom made his international debut for the Estonia national team on 3 June 1992, in a historic 1–1 friendly draw against Slovenia. The match was Estonia's first official match since restoration of independence and Slovenia's first match ever. In November 2003, the Estonian Football Association named Poom Estonia's greatest player of the last 50 years. Poom ended his international career with a testimonial match on 10 June 2009, after a 0–0 friendly draw against Portugal in Tallinn. He made 120 appearances, keeping a clean sheet in 31 matches.

== Personal life ==
Poom and his wife, Lissel, have three sons: Markus, Andreas and Patrick. Markus is also a footballer, while Andreas is a music artist.

== Career statistics ==
=== Club ===
Appearances and goals by club, season and competition
Club	Season	League			National cup		League cup		Continental		Other		Total	
Club	Season	Division	Apps	Goals	Apps	Goals	Apps	Goals	Apps	Goals	Apps	Goals	Apps	Goals
Lõvid/Flora	1988	Estonian Championship	20	0			—		—		—		20	0
Sport Tallinn	1989	Soviet Second League	33	0			—		—		—		33	0
Sport Tallinn	1990	Baltic League	26	0			—		—		—		26	0
Sport Tallinn	Total		59	0			—		—		—		59	0
KuPS	1992	Veikkausliiga	9	0			—		—		—		9	0
Flora	1992–93	Meistriliiga	11	0			—		—		—		11	0
Flora	1993–94	Meistriliiga	11	0			—		—		—		11	0
Flora	Total		22	0			—		—		—		22	0
Wil	1993–94	Nationalliga B	13	0			—		—		—		13	0
Portsmouth	1994–95	First Division	0	0	0	0	0	0	—		—		0	0
Portsmouth	1995–96	First Division	4	0	0	0	3	0	—		—		7	0
Portsmouth	Total		4	0	0	0	3	0	—		—		7	0
Flora (loan)	1995–96	Meistriliiga	7	0	0	0	—		0	0	—		7	0
Flora (loan)	1996–97	Meistriliiga	12	0	0	0	—		2	0	—		14	0
Flora (loan)	Total		19	0	0	0	—		2	0	—		21	0
Derby County	1996–97	Premier League	4	0	0	0	0	0	—		—		4	0
Derby County	1997–98	Premier League	36	0	2	0	3	0	—		—		41	0
Derby County	1998–99	Premier League	17	0	2	0	3	0	—		—		22	0
Derby County	1999–2000	Premier League	28	0	1	0	0	0	—		—		29	0
Derby County	2000–01	Premier League	33	0	2	0	4	0	—		—		39	0
Derby County	2001–02	Premier League	15	0	1	0	0	0	—		—		16	0
Derby County	2002–03	First Division	13	0	0	0	2	0	—		—		15	0
Derby County	Total		146	0	8	0	12	0	—		—		166	0
Sunderland	2002–03	Premier League	4	0	0	0	0	0	—		—		4	0
Sunderland	2003–04	First Division	43	1	6	0	1	0	—		2	0	52	1
Sunderland	2004–05	Championship	11	0	0	0	1	0	—		—		12	0
Sunderland	Total		58	1	6	0	2	0	—		2	0	68	1
Arsenal	2005–06	Premier League	0	0	0	0	0	0	0	0	0	0	0	0
Arsenal	2006–07	Premier League	1	0	0	0	1	0	0	0	—		2	0
Arsenal	Total		1	0	0	0	1	0	0	0	0	0	2	0
Watford	2007–08	Championship	12	0	0	0	0	0	—		0	0	12	0
Watford	2008–09	Championship	7	0	0	0	0	0	—		—		7	0
Watford	Total		19	0	0	0	0	0	—		0	0	19	0
Career total			370	1	14	0	18	0	2	0	2	0	406	1

=== International ===
Appearances and goals by national team and year
National team	Year	Apps	Goals
Estonia	1991	2	0
Estonia	1992	5	0
Estonia	1993	14	0
Estonia	1994	8	0
Estonia	1995	7	0
Estonia	1996	12	0
Estonia	1997	12	0
Estonia	1998	5	0
Estonia	1999	6	0
Estonia	2000	7	0
Estonia	2001	3	0
Estonia	2002	7	0
Estonia	2003	11	0
Estonia	2004	4	0
Estonia	2005	1	0
Estonia	2006	6	0
Estonia	2007	8	0
Estonia	2008	3	0
Estonia	2009	1	0
Total		122	0

== Honours ==
Sunderland

- Football League Championship: 2004–05

Arsenal

- Football League Cup runner-up: 2006–07
- UEFA Champions League runner-up: 2005–06

Individual

- Estonian Footballer of the Year: 1993, 1994, 1997, 1998, 2000, 2003
- Derby County Player of the Year: 1999–2000
- UEFA Jubilee Awards – Greatest Estonian Footballer of the last 50 Years (Golden Player): 2003
- Order of the White Star, 4th Class

== See also ==
- List of men's footballers with 100 or more international caps
