= Adam Bolder =

English footballer

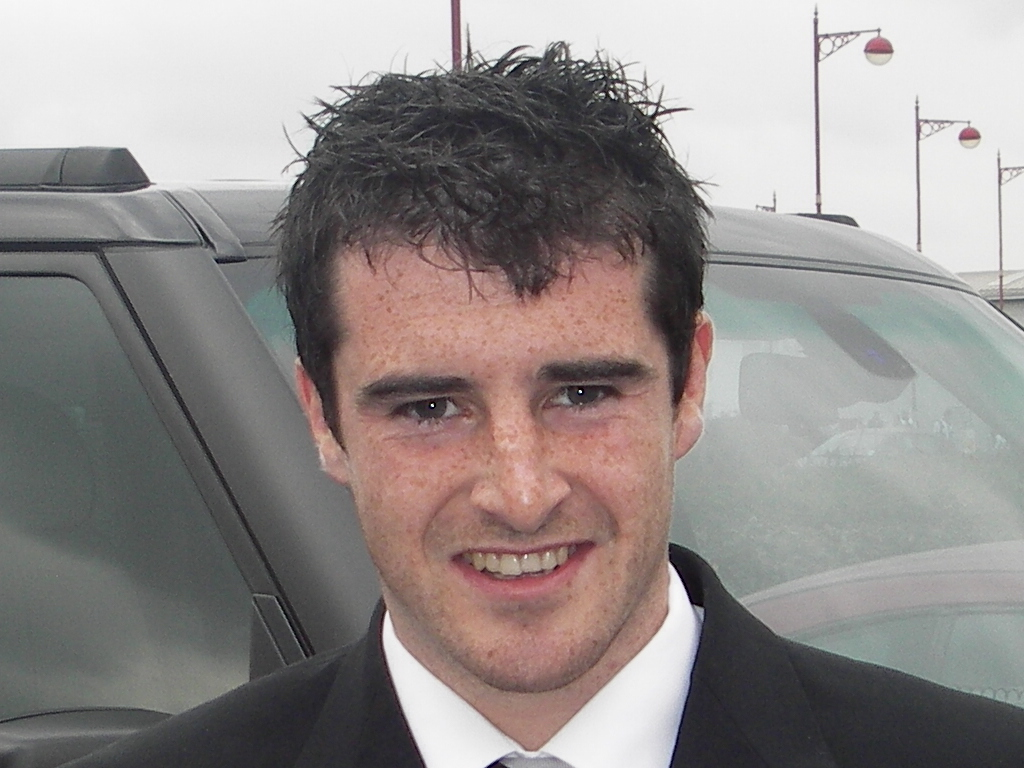
- Bolder in 2006

Personal information
- Full name: Adam Peter Bolder
- Date of birth: 25 October 1980 (age 46)
- Place of birth: Hull, England
- Height: 5 ft 8 1/2 in (1.74 m)
- Position: Midfielder

Team information
- Current team: North Ferriby

Youth career
- Hull City

Senior career*
Years	Team	Apps	(Gls)
1998–2000	Hull City	20	(0)
2000–2007	Derby County	166	(11)
2007–2009	Queens Park Rangers	40	(2)
2008	→ Sheffield Wednesday (loan)	13	(2)
2008–2009	→ Millwall (loan)	8	(0)
2009–2010	Millwall	31	(0)
2010	→ Bradford City (loan)	14	(1)
2010–2012	Burton Albion	81	(4)
2012–2014	Harrogate Town	60	(4)
2014–2016	North Ferriby United	59	(5)
2016	Scarborough Athletic		
2017–2019	North Ferriby United	8	(1)
2021–	North Ferriby		
- * Club domestic league appearances and goals as of 22:15, 15 March 2019 (UTC)

Adam Peter Bolder (born 25 October 1980) is an English professional footballer who plays as a midfielder for North Ferriby.

He played in the Football League for Hull City, Derby County, Queens Park Rangers, Sheffield Wednesday, Millwall, Bradford City and Burton Albion before finishing his career in Non-league football with Harrogate Town, Scarborough Athletic and North Ferriby United.

== Career ==
=== Hull City ===
Bolder began his career in Hull City where he signed his first professional contract in August 1998. His first league game for Hull was against Hartlepool United in January 1999 and that was his only league game for the Tigers in the 1998–99 season. After playing 19 league games for Hull in the first part of the 1999–2000 season he left the club.

=== Derby County ===
Bolder signed for Derby County in March 2000. His first match for Derby was against Manchester United in May 2001 and his second league game this season came against Ipswich Town two weeks later. The following season, he made 11 league appearances for the Rams before he established himself as a first team player with 45 league games and six league goals in the 2002–03 season. His first league goal came in August 2002 against Grimsby Town. Derby won that game 2–1 and Bolder scored both goals for Derby. Bolder then played in 24 league games and scored one league goal in the 2003–04 season, 36 league games and two league goals in the 2004–05 season and 35 league games and two league goals in the 2005–06 season. After playing 13 league games in the first part of the 2006–07 season for Derby, Bolder went out of the first team in early November 2006 and his final appearance for the club from Derbyshire came in a league game against West Bromwich Albion in December 2006.

=== Queens Park Rangers ===
In January 2007 Bolder signed a two-and-a-half-year-long contract for Queens Park Rangers, where he was reunited with his former boss, John Gregory. QPR were struggling at the time, and there was a lack of grit and determination within the team. Bolder came in, and added steel to the midfield, with some good tackling performances and an excellent range of passing. Combined with the signings of Danny Cullip and Lee Camp (on loan), Bolder helped QPR to avoid relegation, quite comfortably in the end and was named as club captain. On 27 October 2007, Bolder scored his first goal for Queens Park Rangers in a 1–0 win over Charlton Athletic at The Valley which lifted QPR off the bottom of the table. On 8 February 2008, it was announced that Bolder would be joining fellow Championship side Sheffield Wednesday on a month's loan, which was later extended to the end of the 2007–08 season. On 8 April 2008 Bolder scored his first goals in an Owls shirt, netting twice in the Steel City Derby against Sheffield United in a 2–2 draw.

=== Millwall ===
He joined Millwall initially on loan on 6 November 2008, before joining them permanently on 29 January 2009, in a deal that will keep him at the club until 2011.

On 5 March 2010 Bolder joined League Two side Bradford City on a one-month loan deal. During his spell at Bradford he scored once against Morecambe.

=== Burton Albion ===
Bolder signed for Football League Two side Burton Albion on 22 July 2010.

Bolder was released by the club at the end of the 2011–12 season. He signed for Harrogate Town for the start of the 2012–13 season.

=== Non-League ===
For the start of the 2014–15 season he signed for North Ferriby United.

He signed for Scarborough Athletic at the start of the 2016–17 season.

On 26 November 2017 Bolder signed for North Ferriby United with his brother Chris being appointed as manager 2 days later.

In 2021, he came out of retirement to join phoenix club North Ferriby, managed by his brother Chris.

== Personal life ==
Bolder is the older brother of fellow footballer Chris Bolder. The two brothers featured in one same game against each other. A 3–1 win for his brother's Grimsby Town over Derby County on Boxing Day 2002. However they were not on the field at the same time with Adam being replaced by Georgi Kinkladze in the 46th minute, meanwhile Chris came on to replace Iain Ward in the 72nd minute.

== Career statistics ==
As of match played 16 December 2017

Appearances and goals by club, season and competition
Club	Season	League			FA Cup		League Cup		Other		Total	
Club	Season	Division	Apps	Goals	Apps	Goals	Apps	Goals	Apps	Goals	Apps	Goals
Hull City	1998–99	Third Division	1	0	0	0	0	0	0	0	1	0
Hull City	1999–2000	Third Division	19	0	0	0	0	0	3 (Note: Appearances in the Football League Trophy)	0	22	0
Hull City	Hull City total		20	0	0	0	0	0	3	0	23	0
Derby County	2000–01	Premier League	2	0	0	0	0	0	—		2	0
Derby County	2001–02	Premier League	11	0	1	0	0	0	—		12	0
Derby County	2002–03	First Division	45	6	1	0	2	0	—		48	6
Derby County	2003–04	First Division	24	1	1	0	0	0	—		25	1
Derby County	2004–05	Championship	36	2	2	0	1	0	2 (Note: Appearances in the Championship play-offs)	0	41	2
Derby County	2005–06	Championship	35	2	2	0	1	0	—		38	2
Derby County	2006–07	Championship	13	0	0	0	2	0	—		15	0
Derby County	Derby County total		166	11	7	0	6	0	2	0	181	11
Queens Park Rangers	2006–07	Championship	16	0	0	0	—		—		16	0
Queens Park Rangers	2007–08	Championship	24	2	0	0	1	0	—		25	2
Queens Park Rangers	2008–09	Championship	0	0	0	0	1	0	—		1	0
Queens Park Rangers	QPR total		40	2	0	0	2	0	0	0	42	2
Sheffield Wednesday (loan)	2007–08	Championship	13	2	0	0	—		—		13	2
Millwall (loan)	2008–09	League One	8	0	3	0	—		0	0	11	0
Millwall	2008–09	League One	20	0	0	0	—		3 (Note: Appearances in the League One play-offs)	0	23	0
Millwall	2009–10	League One	11	0	1	0	1	0	1	0	14	0
Millwall	Millwall total		31	0	1	0	1	0	4	0	37	0
Bradford City (loan)	2009–10	League Two	14	1	—		—		0	0	14	1
Burton Albion	2010–11	League Two	37	1	4	0	1	0	1	0	43	1
Burton Albion	2011–12	League Two	44	3	1	0	1	0	0	0	46	3
Burton Albion	Burton total		81	4	5	0	2	0	1	0	89	4
Harrogate Town	2012–13	Conference North	33	2	5	0	—		1 (Note: Appearances in the FA Trophy)	0	39	2
Harrogate Town	2013–14	Conference North	27	2	0	0	—		0	0	27	2
Harrogate Town	Harrogate total		60	4	5	0	0	0	1	0	66	4
North Ferriby United	2014–15	Conference North	29	3	1	0	—		7	0	37	3
North Ferriby United	2015–16	National League North	30	2	2	0	—		0	0	32	2
North Ferriby United	North Ferriby total		59	5	3	0	0	0	7	0	69	5
Scarborough Athletic	2016–17	NPL Division One North					—					
North Ferriby United	2017–18	National League North	2	0	0	0	—		0	0	2	0
Career total			494	29	24	0	11	0	18	0	547	29

== Honours ==
North Ferriby United

- FA Trophy: 2014–15
