= Stefano Eranio =

Italian former football player

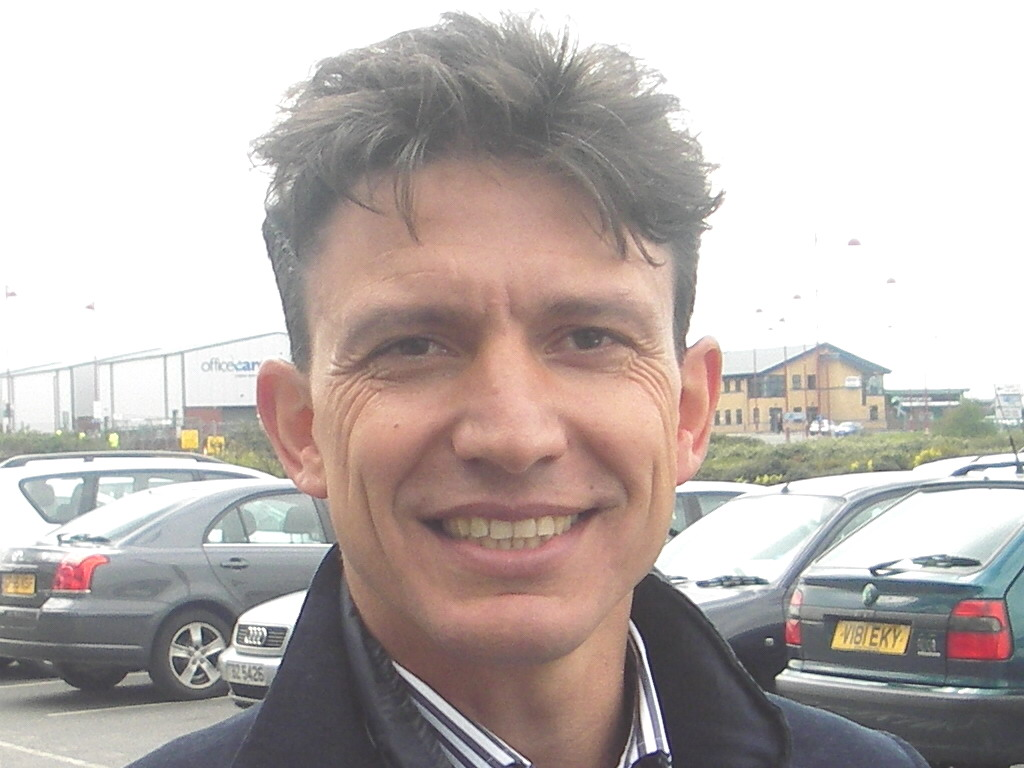
- Eranio in 2006

Personal information
- Date of birth: 29 December 1966 (age 59)
- Place of birth: Genoa, Italy
- Height: 1.78 m (5 ft 10 in)
- Position: Winger

Team information
- Current team: Milan (youth coach)

Senior career*
Years	Team	Apps	(Gls)
1984–1992	Genoa	212	(13)
1992–1997	Milan	98	(6)
1997–2001	Derby County	95	(7)
2002–2003	Pro Sesto	15	(1)
Total		420	(27)

International career
1990–1997	Italy	20	(3)
- * Club domestic league appearances and goals

Stefano Eranio (Italian pronunciation: [ˈsteːfano eˈraːnjo]; born 29 December 1966) is an Italian former professional footballer who played as a midfielder. Throughout his career, Eranio played mainly as a right winger; he is mostly remembered for having played for Italian clubs A.C. Milan, and Genoa, as well as English side Derby County, and he also represented Italy 20 times between 1990 and 1997 at international level. He was voted one of Derby County's 11 greatest ever footballers.

== Club career ==
=== Genoa and Milan ===
Eranio started his professional football career with Genoa in August 1984. His first five seasons at Genoa were in Serie B, until in 1989, the club were promoted to Serie A. In total, Eranio played for the club for eight seasons, before moving to AC Milan in August 1992. At Milan he won three league titles (1993, 1994 and 1996), three Italian Super Cups (1992, 1993 and 1994) and he also played in two Champions League finals. The first was in 1992–93, when Milan lost 1–0 to Marseille, and the second was in 1994–95 when his club lost 1–0 to Ajax. Although he was part of the team's successful Champions League campaign during the 1993–94 season, but he did not play in the final due to injury. He also added the European Super Cup to his trophy collection in 1994.

=== Derby County and Pro Sesto ===
In May 1997, he moved on a free transfer to English club Derby County, where he became a fan favourite; he made his Derby, and FA Premier League debut, on 9 August 1997 against Blackburn Rovers. His first goal for the Derbyshire club came on 30 August 1997 when he scored in a league game against Barnsley; this was also the first goal scored at Derby's new home stadium, Pride Park, which the club had moved to in the summer. Eranio considered retiring after the 2000–01 season, but manager Jim Smith persuaded him to stay on. When Smith resigned in October 2001, Eranio chose to leave Derby County. He retired in 2003 after spending a season with Serie C2 side Pro Sesto, where he was featured in a player/assistant manager position.

He is widely considered to be one of the greatest and most influential players to play for Derby County and, on 1 May 2006, Eranio and Ted McMinn were inducted as Derby Legends.

== International career ==
Eranio made his senior international debut for Italy on 22 December 1990, in a UEFA Euro 1992 qualifying match against Cyprus, which Italy won 4-0. His first international goal came in a friendly against the Netherlands on 9 September 1992; Italy won the game 3–2.

On 29 March 1997, Eranio played his last game for Italy, against Moldova in a 3–0 home win. In total, he received 20 caps, and scored three goals.

== Style of play ==
Eranio's main attributes were his technique, pace, stamina, and his ability to make attacking runs. Although he was primarily used as an offensive or wide midfielder on the right flank, he was also competent defensively, and he was occasionally deployed as a full-back.

== Post-playing career ==
=== Coaching ===
Eranio has been part of the A.C. Milan youth coaching staff since 2005, and is currently head of the Giovanissimi Nazionali (under-15) youth team.

=== Media and controversy ===
On 22 October 2015, Eranio was fired by Swiss television station RSI following racist remarks. Criticising an error made by Roma defender Antonio Rüdiger during the 4–4 draw in the Champions League against Bayer Leverkusen, Eranio had stated: "Black players in the defensive line often make these mistakes because they’re not concentrated. They are powerful physically, but when it is time to think … they often make this type of error."

In August 2025, Eranio's past comments resurfaced when Derby County faced criticism for including him in their new Walk of Fame at Pride Park. Fans and historians expressed frustration that Eranio was honoured while other figures, such as Nazi-defying goalkeeper Jack Kirby (English footballer), were initially omitted. Critics argued that celebrating Eranio "emboldens" and "accommodates" the views he expressed.

== Career statistics ==
=== Club ===
Club	League matches	League goals	Total matches	Total goals	Dates
Genoa	212	13	?	?	08/1984 – 05/1992
Milan	98	6	?	?	08/1992 – 05/1997
Derby County	95	7	108	10	05/1997 – 10/2001

== Honours ==
Milan

- Serie A: 1992–93, 1993–94, 1995–96
- Supercoppa Italiana: 1992, 1993, 1994
- UEFA Champions League: 1993–94
- UEFA Supercup: 1994

Genoa

- Serie B: 1988–89

Italy

- Scania 100 Tournament: 1991

== Sources ==
- Mortimer, Gerald (2004): The Who's Who of DERBY COUNTY.
  Breedon Books Publishing, Derby. ISBN 1-85983-409-4
