= Luciano Zavagno =

Argentine footballer

Personal information
- Full name: Luciano Germán Zavagno
- Date of birth: August 6, 1977 (age 49)
- Place of birth: Santa Fe, Argentina
- Height: 1.82 m (5 ft 11 1/2 in)
- Position: Defender

Senior career*
Years	Team	Apps	(Gls)
1994–1997	Unión de Santa Fe	65	(1)
1997–1999	Strasbourg	14	(1)
1999–2001	Troyes	47	(0)
2001–2004	Derby County	52	(3)
2004	Ancona	8	(0)
2004–2005	Estudiantes	0	(0)
2005–2006	Catania	15	(0)
2006–2007	Ionikos	14	(0)
2007–2009	Pisa	75	(1)
2009–2010	Ancona	35	(1)
2010–2012	Torino	22	(0)
- * Club domestic league appearances and goals as of 21 July 2012

Luciano Germán Zavagno (born August 6, 1977, in Santa Fe) is an Argentine retired footballer.

== Club career ==
Zavagno has played football in Argentina, France, England, Italy and Greece. In 2010, he signed for Torino of the Italian Serie B.

He started his career in 1994 at Unión de Santa Fe in the Argentine 2nd division. In 1996 the club were promoted to the Primera Division Argentina.

In 1997 Zavagno moved to France to play for Strasbourg and then Troyes in 1999. At Troyes he helped them become one of the winners of the 2001 UEFA Intertoto Cup.

In 2001, he moved to England to play for Derby County where he stayed until January 2004 when he moved to Italy to play for Ancona and then Catania. Derby sold Zavagno to cut the wage bill. In 2006, he played for Ionikos of the Super League in Greece.

== Post-playing career ==
Following his retirement, Zavagno took on a career as a football director. After working at Torino and Chelsea as a scout, he was subsequently hired by City Football Group on a supervising and scouting role for all clubs owned by the holding. Following City Football Group's acquisition of Palermo in 2022, Zavagno relocated to Sicily, as part of the club's managerial staff in charge of transfers and scouting. His role at Palermo was further confirmed following director of football Renzo Castagnini's resignations and the subsequent promotion of Leandro Rinaudo on an interim basis.

== Honours ==
Troyes AC

- UEFA Intertoto Cup: 2001
