= Brian O'Neil (footballer, born 1972) =

Scottish footballer (born 1972)

Personal information
- Full name: Brian O'Neil
- Date of birth: 6 September 1972 (age 54)
- Place of birth: Paisley, Scotland
- Position: Midfielder

Senior career*
Years	Team	Apps	(Gls)
1991–1997	Celtic	119	(8)
1997	→ Nottingham Forest (loan)	5	(0)
1997–1998	Aberdeen	29	(1)
1998–2000	VfL Wolfsburg	50	(3)
2000–2003	Derby County	17	(0)
2003–2006	Preston North End	112	(5)
Total		332	(17)

International career
1996–2005	Scotland	7	(0)
Medal record
Men's football
Representing Scotland
FIFA U-16 World Championship
Runner-up	1989 Scotland
- * Club domestic league appearances and goals

Brian O'Neil (born 6 September 1972) is a Scottish former professional footballer, who played as a defensive midfielder for Celtic, Nottingham Forest, Aberdeen, Wolfsburg, Derby County, Preston North End and the Scotland national team. O'Neil was forced to retire from playing in October 2006 due to long standing injury problems.

== Club career ==
=== Celtic ===
O'Neil started his career at Celtic, where he played 155 competitive games in almost every outfield position and scored 10 times. Highlights of his time at Celtic Park include scoring an injury time winner in October 1993 against Old Firm rivals Rangers at Ibrox and an extra time winner against Aberdeen in October 1994 in the semi-final of the Scottish League Cup.

=== Nottingham Forest loan ===
In 1997, O'Neil was loaned out to Nottingham Forest but returned to Celtic after the end of the loan period after Nottingham Forest failed in bids to buy him at the end of the season.

=== Aberdeen ===
In 1997, Aberdeen agreed a fee of £850,000 for O'Neil. He played for them in 29 league games, scoring once, in a game against Dunfermline.

=== Wolfsburg ===
O'Neil joined German club VfL Wolfsburg for £350,000 and spent two and a half successful seasons in the Bundesliga, during which time they qualified for the UEFA Cup for the first time in their history (they were eliminated by Atlético Madrid in the fifth round). O'Neil enjoyed cult status in Wolfsburg during his period there and remains a popular figure in the club's history.

=== Derby County ===
In November 2000, O'Neil returned to England to sign for Premiership club Derby County, but six operations in two seasons limited him to 17 appearances. In November 2003, after a dispute with the club's chief executive, he was released from his contract.

=== Preston North End ===
Following his release from Derby, O'Neil joined Preston North End. He enjoyed relative success with the Deepdale club, scoring 5 times in 110 games and becoming well-regarded by Preston supporters for his calm play and fine passing in the centre of the pitch. During his time at the club he helped Preston to the play-off final in 2005 only to lose to West Ham United. His final game for Preston was another play-off defeat, this time in the 2006 semi-final to Leeds United. O'Neil was subsequently injured and forced to retire the following season in October 2006.

== International career ==
O'Neil played for the Scotland U16 team in the 1989 FIFA Under 16 World Cup which was hosted by Scotland. In front of a crowd of 28,555 at Tynecastle, in the semi-final against a Portugal team comprising future stars such as Luís Figo and Abel Xavier, O'Neil scored the only goal to take Scotland into the final. Scotland drew 2–2 with Saudi Arabia after extra time in the final, and lost 5–4 on penalties. O'Neil missed a penalty late on in the second half and then a penalty in the shoot-out.

O'Neil played for his country seven times at senior level, making his debut in March 1996 in a 1–0 win over Australia at Hampden. He won a recall to the squad after five years away for Walter Smith's Scotland squads in the early part of 2005. He won what proved to be his last cap in August 2005, in a 2–2 draw against Austria.

== Post-playing career ==
In 2010, it was announced that O'Neil had signed up for Preston North End's team in the Masters Football Tournament in Liverpool. He played along with Sean Gregan, Lee Cartwright and Andy Fensome.
