= Branko Strupar =

Croatian-Belgian footballer

Personal information
- Full name: Branko Strupar
- Date of birth: 9 February 1970 (age 56)
- Place of birth: Zagreb, SR Croatia, Yugoslavia
- Height: 1.91 m (6 ft 3 in)
- Position: Striker

Senior career*
Years	Team	Apps	(Gls)
1989–1994	Špansko	137	(68)
1994–1999	Genk	168	(106)
1999–2003	Derby County	41	(16)
2003–2004	Dinamo Zagreb	13	(7)
Total		359	(197)

International career
1999–2002	Belgium	17	(5)
- * Club domestic league appearances and goals

Branko Strupar (born 9 February 1970) is a Croatian-Belgian former professional footballer who played as a striker. In 1999, he became a naturalised Belgian. He consequently played for the Belgium national team, with whom he played 17 matches and scored five times.

== Early career ==
Strupar was born in Zagreb, Croatia, Yugoslavia and started his footballing career with the local county tier club Špansko in the west of the city. He was scouted by a number of Croatian and European clubs in early 1990s, and ultimately joined Genk in 1994.

== Club career ==
Strupar played in Belgium for Genk, winning promotion to the Belgian First Division in 1996, and becoming champion of Belgium with the same team in 1999. He also won the Belgian Golden Shoe as Player of the Year for 1998. In 1998, he finished as top scorer with 22 goals. He moved to Derby County in December 1999, where he most notably scored the first British league goal of the year 2000 after two minutes against Watford, a game in which he scored twice. While at Derby, Strupar gained popularity with his prolific scoring ability.

Despite an excellent goals-to-games ratio when fit, injuries curtailed his Derby career, and he was eventually given a free transfer, with which he returned to Croatia for a brief spell at Dinamo Zagreb to wind up his career.

== International career ==
He made his debut for Belgium in an August 1999 friendly match against Finland, coming on as a 46th-minute substitute for Sandy Martens, and earned a total of 17 caps, scoring five goals. His final international was a June 2002 World Cup match against Tunisia.

== Personal life ==
Strupar lives in Prečko with his wife, daughters Dora and Laura and his son Bruno. He worked as a guest football commentator on the Croatian network RTL.

== Honours ==
Genk

- Belgian Cup: 1997–98
- Belgian First Division: 1998–99

Dinamo Zagreb

- Croatian Football Super Cup: 2003

Belgium

- FIFA Fair Play Trophy: 2002 World Cup

Individual

- Belgian First Division A top scorer: 1997–98 (22 goals)
- Belgian Golden Shoe: 1998
