= Lewis Hunt =

English footballer

Personal information
- Full name: Lewis James Hunt
- Date of birth: 25 August 1982 (age 44)
- Place of birth: Birmingham, England
- Height: 5 ft 11 in (1.80 m)
- Positions: Defender; midfielder

Youth career
- –2001: Derby County

Senior career*
Years	Team	Apps	(Gls)
2001–2004	Derby County	11	(0)
2003–2004	→ Southend United (loan)	26	(0)
2004–2008	Southend United	120	(2)
2008–2010	Wycombe Wanderers	47	(1)
2010–2011	Bradford City	25	(1)
2012	Hendon	3	(0)
2012	Sutton United	12	(0)
Total		244	(4)
- * Club domestic league appearances and goals as of 03:51, 2 February 2016 (UTC)

Lewis James Hunt (born 25 August 1982 in Birmingham, West Midlands) is an English footballer who last played for Sutton United.

== Career ==
Hunt's versatility was a big bonus to Southend United when he joined the club from Derby County, making an initial loan deal permanent in the summer of 2004. He featured 11 times for the Rams, but the chance of regular first team football convinced him to join the Blues.

Hunt was released by Southend United at the end of the 2007–08 season.

He subsequently signed a two-year deal with Wycombe Wanderers on 23 July 2008. After missing the first two months of the season with an injury, Hunt scored his first goal for Wycombe on 15 November in a 1–0 home win against future club Bradford City.

On 30 July 2010, Hunt signed a one-year deal with Bradford City, reuniting himself with manager Peter Taylor after a two-week trial. He scored his first and only goal for the club in a 2–1 win over Rotherham United.

On 9 May 2011, Bradford City confirmed that Hunt would remain at the club for the forthcoming season. However, his contract was cancelled by mutual consent on 25 October 2011.

He signed for Isthmian League Premier Division club Hendon in early January 2012, but moved a month later to Sutton United of the Conference South.

== Honours ==
Southend United

- Football League One: 2005–06
- Football League Trophy runner-up: 2003–04
