= Lee Morris (footballer) =

English footballer (born 1980)

Personal information
- Full name: Lee Morris
- Date of birth: 30 April 1980 (age 46)
- Place of birth: Blackpool, England
- Height: 5 ft 10 in (1.78 m)
- Position: Forward

Team information
- Current team: SC United Bantams (Head coach)

Youth career
- York City
- ?–1997: Sheffield United

Senior career*
Years	Team	Apps	(Gls)
1997–1999	Sheffield United	38	(8)
1999–2004	Derby County	92	(17)
2001	→ Huddersfield Town (loan)	5	(1)
2004–2006	Leicester City	10	(0)
2006–2008	Yeovil Town	34	(5)
2008–2009	Burton Albion	28	(7)
2009–2010	Hereford United	11	(0)
2009–2010	→ Mansfield Town (loan)	4	(1)
2010	→ Forest Green Rovers (loan)	8	(2)
2010–2011	Kidderminster Harriers	29	(5)
2011	Eastwood Town	7	(3)
2011–2012	Solihull Moors	21	(6)
2013	Leek Town		
2013	Buxton		
2013–2015	Loughborough Dynamo	4	

International career
1997–1999	England U18	4	(0)
1999	England U21	1	(0)

Managerial career
- 2011: Eastwood Town (player/first team coach)
- 2012–2013: Derby County (academy)
- 2013–2015: Loughborough Dynamo (player/first team coach)
- 2014: Loughborough Dynamo (caretaker)
- 2015: Derby County (academy)
- 2017: SC United Bantams
- 2018–: SC United Bantams
- * Club domestic league appearances and goals

Lee Morris (born 30 April 1980) is an English football manager and former player. He has previously played as a forward for Sheffield United, Derby County and Leicester City among other teams. He is the head coach of SC United Bantams.

== Club career ==
Morris was born in Blackpool, Lancashire, during his father Colin's time with the town's club and followed his father into football. He began his career with York City's Centre of Excellence before becoming a trainee at Sheffield United. He signed a professional contract with United on 24 December 1997 before making 26 league appearances and scoring six goals for the first team. This caught Derby County's attention and in the winter of 1999 he transferred for a then club record fee of £3 million, making him the 4th most expensive teenager in British football history. During his time at Derby County he scored 17 goals in 92 league games, including playing in the famous 1–0 win at Old Trafford vs Manchester United, and scoring the winning goal against Spurs. He then had a short loan spell at Huddersfield Town, where he scored once against Barnsley.

At the start of 2004 he moved to Leicester City where he started only 10 games. His time at the Walkers Stadium was plagued by knee injury, and he was released at the end of the 2005/06 season. Seizing the opportunity Yeovil Town snapped up Morris on a free transfer on 2 August 2006. He had a successful season there, being part of the squad which finished in Yeovil's highest ever league position at the time, and played at Wembley in the play off final against Blackpool after scoring in the famous 5–2 victory against Nottingham Forest in the semi-final. Lee left Yeovil on 11 March 2008 owing to injuries, before joining Burton Albion in August 2008, initially on non-contract terms. Morris then signed with Burton for the rest of the season, which was Burton's most successful season, winning the Blue Square Premiership and gaining status in the football league for the 1st time.

On 9 July 2009, Morris featured as a trialist for Hereford United, their pre-season friendlies against Pegasus Juniors and Bristol City, scoring in both games. He also scored twice against local side Wellington.

On 25 July 2009, Lee agreed a one-year contract with Hereford United. In November 2009 he went on loan to Mansfield Town, scoring his first goal for the club against Gateshead on 1 December 2009. He then went out on loan again for a month to another Conference National side, Forest Green Rovers.

Morris scored on his debut for Forest Green coming on as substitute to score the second goal in a 2–0 away win at Kettering Town. His second goal for Forest Green later that month was a 25-yard match winner against Barrow.

Morris had his Hereford contract cancelled by 'mutual consent' on 27 April 2010.

During the close season he had trials with Bradford City, and played the second half of their opening 2010/11 friendly with Eccleshill United in which Bradford won by two goals to nil.

Morris spent the 2010–11 season with Kidderminster Harriers. At the end of the season he was offered a coaching role at the club working with the academy as well as continuing his playing career however he turned it down and became a player-coach at Eastwood Town, linking up with his former Huddersfield Town and Forest Green teammate, Craig Armstrong.

In March 2013, Morris joined Leek Town on non-contract terms.

In 2013 Morris joined Loughborough Dynamo F.C. as a player/first-team coach, later becoming joint manager of the club in October 2014, following the departure of former manager Tommy Brookbanks.

== International career ==
Morris made his debut for the England national under-18 team in a 2–1 away defeat to Russia in a 1998 UEFA European Under-18 Championship qualifying match on 26 October 1997. He was capped four times by the under-18s from 1997 to 1999 before making his only appearance for the England national under-21 team in a 1–0 away win over Bulgaria in a 2000 UEFA European Under-21 Championship qualification on 8 June 1999.

== Coaching career ==
Morris became coach of the under 15's squad in the academy at former club Derby County in July 2012 after leaving Solihull Moors.He also took on roles with Development centre players and shadow squads within the Derby County coaching setup, working with children from the ages of 8 through to 16. In July 2015 he took on a role of working with Derby County under 16's. In February 2015 he qualified as a UEFA A Licensed coach, and quickly followed that up by gaining the F.A. Youth Award. In October 2014 Lee became joint manager of Semi-professional Loughborough Dynamo F.C. Lee managed the side to a respectable 14th-place finish in the Northern Premier League Division One South. Morris quit Loughborough Dynamo in September 2015 after being appointed under 16s joint coach at Derby County.

Morris is not to be confused with another Lee Morris, the current Worsbrough Bridge Athletic Manager, who is from Rotherham, has managed Goole FC and Frickley Town, and who in contrast predominantly played his career in the Northern Premier League.

He was appointed as manager of SC United Bantams in March 2018.

== Honours ==
Burton Albion

- Conference Premier: 2008–09

Awards and achievements
Preceded by Fabrizio Ravanelli	Derby County Top Goalscorer; 2002–03; With: Malcolm Christie	Succeeded by Ian Taylor
