= Darryl Powell =

Jamaican footballer (born 1971)

Personal information
- Full name: Darryl Anthony Powell
- Date of birth: 15 November 1971 (age 54)
- Place of birth: Lambeth, London, England
- Position: Midfielder

Senior career*
Years	Team	Apps	(Gls)
1989–1995	Portsmouth	132	(16)
1995–2002	Derby County	207	(10)
2002–2003	Birmingham City	11	(0)
2003	Sheffield Wednesday	8	(0)
2003–2004	Colorado Rapids	18	(0)
2005	Nottingham Forest	11	(0)
Total		387	(26)

International career
1998–2001	Jamaica	21	(1)
- * Club domestic league appearances and goals

Darryl Anthony Powell (born 15 November 1971) is a sports agent and former professional footballer who made more than 350 appearances in the Football League and Premier League and played international football for the Jamaica national team. He usually played as a central midfielder.

== Career ==
The son of a Reggae musician, he was born in Lambeth, London, and his career included spells at English clubs Portsmouth, Derby County, Birmingham City, Sheffield Wednesday and Nottingham Forest, as well as a stint at Colorado Rapids in the USA. Along with his Derby teammate Deon Burton he was one of the Reggae Boyz playing for Jamaica in France 98. Powell was sent off in the match versus Argentina in Paris, a 5–0 defeat.

== Personal life ==
As of 2015, he works as a sports agent.

Powell has also appeared as a guest on the beach soccer circuit, playing for the England national beach soccer team in an exhibition game in Birmingham.
