= Malcolm Christie =

English footballer

Personal information
- Full name: Malcolm Neil Christie
- Date of birth: 11 April 1979 (age 47)
- Place of birth: Stamford, England
- Position: Striker

Youth career
- 1996–1997: Deeping Rangers

Senior career*
Years	Team	Apps	(Gls)
1997–1998	Nuneaton Borough		
1998–2003	Derby County	116	(30)
2003–2007	Middlesbrough	43	(7)
2008–2009	Leeds United	4	(1)
Total		163	(38)

International career
2001–2002	England U21	11	(3)
- * Club domestic league appearances and goals

Malcolm Neil Christie (born 11 April 1979) is an English former professional footballer who played as a striker.

Initially playing at non-league level for Deeping Rangers and Nuneaton Borough, he went on to play in the Premier League for both Derby County and Middlesbrough whilst also earning 11 caps for England U21. His career abruptly came to and end in 2009 whilst with Leeds United following a spinal injury.

== Career ==
=== Early career ===
Born in Stamford, Lincolnshire, Christie first played football as a youth in the Peterborough area, and started his career at Northborough, moving onto non-League clubs Deeping Rangers and Nuneaton Borough. Whilst playing in non-League football he was also a supermarket shelf stacker.

=== Derby County ===
Christie's big break came in October 1998 when he was purchased by Derby County manager Jim Smith. His first start for the club came on 15 January 2000, and marked the occasion with two goals in a 4–1 win against Middlesbrough. On 5 May 2001, he scored the winning goal at Old Trafford as Derby beat Manchester United 1–0 to secure survival for the club. He spent one more season with Derby after they were relegated from the FA Premier League.

=== Middlesbrough ===
Middlesbrough signed Christie and Chris Riggott for a combined £3 million (possibly rising to £5m) in February 2003. Christie was part of Middlesbrough's 2004 League Cup-winning team. Despite being injured for the final, he appeared in the earlier rounds and scored the winner against Brighton & Hove Albion. His chances were limited at his new club due to several long-term injuries. In 2006, although unable to play due to injury, Christie was invited back to Nuneaton Borough as guest of honour for their FA Cup third round tie against Middlesbrough. Nuneaton went on to shock their visitors by producing a 1–1 draw, and earning a replay at the Riverside Stadium.

On 25 November 2006, after returning from his injuries, manager Gareth Southgate gave Christie a start against Aston Villa at Villa Park. Christie scored on his return in the 43rd minute in a match which finished 1–1. He was released by Middlesbrough when his contract expired in June 2007. He started a trial period with Hull City on 11 September 2007. However, he was not offered a contract at the end of his two-month trial. In January, Burton Albion offered to sign him, but he rejected the move.

=== Leeds United ===
In January 2008, he began a trial with Leeds United, but picked up an injury which scuppered any deal. In September, he began using the training facilities at Leeds United in a bid to gain full fitness with the blessing of Leeds' manager Gary McAllister; although, at the time, the offer was considered to be a courtesy, and not intended to be a trial On 13 October 2008, however, he was cleared to play in a reserves fixture for Leeds against Scunthorpe United. On 10 November, McAllister began to open up contract talks with Christie after regaining his fitness. Having signed on non-contract terms, he made his "surprise" debut on 17 November against Northampton Town in the first round of the FA Cup. Christie scored his first goal for Leeds on 28 December in a 3–1 victory away from home against Stockport County. Having failed to secure a contract and falling out of favour under new manager Simon Grayson, Christie departed the club in January.

== Personal life ==
Christie suffered a spinal injury in training and, following medical advice, retired from professional football on 29 January 2009. Following his retirement, Christie took up a new career working as a salesman for Jaguar.
