= 2000–01 Watford F.C. season =

English football team season

Watford
2000–01 season
- Chairman: Elton John
- Manager: Graham Taylor
- Stadium: Vicarage Road
- First Division: 9th
- FA Cup: Third round
- League Cup: Third round
- Top goalscorer: League: Tommy Mooney (19); All: Tommy Mooney (22)
- Average home league attendance: 13,941

During the 2000–01 English football season, Watford competed in the Football League First Division. The club was relegated from the Premier League in the previous season.

== Season summary ==
After relegation from the Premier League, Watford stabilised in the First Division to finish 9th, five points off the play-off places. A total of 143 goals were scored in league matches involving Watford; only champions Fulham scored more goals than Watford's 76, whilst Sheffield Wednesday, Crystal Palace, Tranmere Rovers and Queens Park Rangers were the only teams to concede more than Watford's 67 league goals. Manager Graham Taylor announced his retirement at the end of the season – former Chelsea manager Gianluca Vialli was named as his replacement.

== Final league table ==
| Pos | Team | Pld | W | D | L | GF | GA | GD | Pts |
|---|---|---|---|---|---|---|---|---|---|
| 7 | Burnley | 46 | 21 | 9 | 16 | 50 | 54 | −4 | 72 |
| 8 | Wimbledon | 46 | 17 | 18 | 11 | 71 | 50 | +21 | 69 |
| 9 | Watford | 46 | 20 | 9 | 17 | 76 | 67 | +9 | 69 |
| 10 | Sheffield United | 46 | 19 | 11 | 16 | 52 | 49 | +3 | 68 |
| 11 | Nottingham Forest | 46 | 20 | 8 | 18 | 55 | 53 | +2 | 68 |

Rules for classification: 1) Points; 2) Goal difference; 3) Goals scored

Results summary

| Overall | | | | | | | | Home | | | | | | Away | | | | | |
| Pld | W | D | L | GF | GA | GD | Pts | W | D | L | GF | GA | GD | W | D | L | GF | GA | GD |
|---|---|---|---|---|---|---|---|---|---|---|---|---|---|---|---|---|---|---|---|
| 46 | 20 | 9 | 17 | 76 | 67 | +9 | 69 | 11 | 6 | 6 | 46 | 29 | +17 | 9 | 3 | 11 | 30 | 38 | −8 |

Source: 2000–01 Football League First Division table

Results by matchday

| Matchday | 1 | 2 | 3 | 4 | 5 | 6 | 7 | 8 | 9 | 10 | 11 | 12 | 13 | 14 | 15 | 16 | 17 | 18 | 19 | 20 | 21 | 22 | 23 | 24 | 25 | 26 | 27 | 28 | 29 | 30 | 31 | 32 | 33 | 34 | 35 | 36 | 37 | 38 | 39 | 40 | 41 | 42 | 43 | 44 | 45 | 46 |
|---|---|---|---|---|---|---|---|---|---|---|---|---|---|---|---|---|---|---|---|---|---|---|---|---|---|---|---|---|---|---|---|---|---|---|---|---|---|---|---|---|---|---|---|---|---|---|
| Ground | A | H | A | H | A | A | H | A | H | H | H | A | H | A | H | H | A | H | A | A | H | H | A | A | H | A | H | A | A | H | A | H | H | A | A | H | H | A | H | H | A | H | A | H | A | A |
| Result | W | W | D | W | W | W | W | W | W | W | D | W | W | D | W | L | L | L | L | L | D | L | L | W | W | W | L | L | W | D | L | L | D | L | D | W | L | L | W | D | L | W | L | D | W | L |
| Position | 5 | 3 | 4 | 2 | 1 | 2 | 2 | 2 | 2 | 1 | 2 | 2 | 1 | 1 | 1 | 1 | 2 | 2 | 4 | 5 | 4 | 6 | 8 | 6 | 5 | 5 | 5 | 6 | 6 | 5 | 6 | 6 | 6 | 6 | 9 | 7 | 7 | 8 | 7 | 8 | 8 | 8 | 10 | 11 | 7 | 9 |

Source: 11v11.com: 2000-01 Watford results
A = Away; H = Home; W = Win; D = Draw; L = Loss

== Results ==
Watford's score comes first

=== Legend ===
| Win | Draw | Loss |

=== Football League First Division ===
| Date | Opponent | Venue | Result | Attendance | Scorers |
|---|---|---|---|---|---|
| 12 August 2000 | Huddersfield Town | A | 2–1 | 13,018 | Cox, Smith |
| 19 August 2000 | Barnsley | H | 1–0 | 13,186 | Foley |
| 26 August 2000 | Wimbledon | A | 0–0 | 8,447 | |
| 28 August 2000 | Sheffield United | H | 4–1 | 12,675 | Helguson, Mooney, Noel-Williams, Hyde |
| 9 September 2000 | Portsmouth | A | 3–1 | 14,012 | Nielsen, Mooney, Helguson |
| 12 September 2000 | Blackburn Rovers | A | 4–3 | 17,258 | Hyde (2), Helguson, Mooney |
| 16 September 2000 | Crewe Alexandra | H | 3–0 | 13,784 | Smith, Noel-Williams, Hyde |
| 23 September 2000 | Stockport County | A | 3–2 | 6,933 | Smith, Noel-Williams, Nielsen |
| 1 October 2000 | Birmingham City | H | 2–0 | 12,355 | Nielsen, Cox |
| 14 October 2000 | Queens Park Rangers | H | 3–1 | 17,488 | Cox (2), Noel-Williams |
| 17 October 2000 | Gillingham | H | 0–0 | 12,356 | |
| 21 October 2000 | Nottingham Forest | A | 2–0 | 20,065 | Hyde (2) |
| 24 October 2000 | Bolton Wanderers | H | 1–0 | 11,799 | Mooney (pen) |
| 28 October 2000 | Wolverhampton Wanderers | A | 2–2 | 20,296 | Cox, Mooney |
| 4 November 2000 | Grimsby Town | H | 4–0 | 11,600 | Nielsen, Mooney (2), Noel-Williams |
| 7 November 2000 | Sheffield Wednesday | H | 1–3 | 11,166 | Smith |
| 11 November 2000 | Tranmere Rovers | A | 0–2 | 8,858 | |
| 18 November 2000 | Preston North End | H | 2–3 | 13,066 | Mooney, Palmer |
| 3 December 2000 | Bolton Wanderers | A | 1–2 | 13,904 | Smith |
| 9 December 2000 | Crystal Palace | A | 0–1 | 16,049 | |
| 16 December 2000 | West Bromwich Albion | H | 3–3 | 14,601 | Butler (own goal), Mooney (2) |
| 23 December 2000 | Huddersfield Town | H | 1–2 | 13,371 | Heary (own goal) |
| 26 December 2000 | Fulham | A | 0–5 | 5,752 | |
| 29 December 2000 | Barnsley | A | 1–0 | 13,820 | Nielsen |
| 2 January 2001 | Wimbledon | H | 3–1 | 11,336 | Mooney (2), Noel-Williams |
| 13 January 2001 | Sheffield United | A | 1–0 | 17,551 | Mooney |
| 20 January 2001 | Fulham | H | 1–3 | 18,333 | Helguson |
| 27 January 2001 | Norwich City | A | 1–2 | 15,309 | Helguson |
| 3 February 2001 | Sheffield Wednesday | A | 3–2 | 16,134 | Vernazza, Ward, Smith |
| 10 February 2001 | Portsmouth | H | 2–2 | 16,051 | Smith (2) |
| 17 February 2001 | Crewe Alexandra | A | 0–2 | 6,757 | |
| 20 February 2001 | Blackburn Rovers | H | 0–1 | 15,970 | |
| 24 February 2001 | Stockport County | H | 2–2 | 13,647 | Mooney, Nielsen |
| 2 March 2001 | Birmingham City | A | 0–2 | 20,724 | |
| 7 March 2001 | Queens Park Rangers | A | 1–1 | 12,436 | Nielsen |
| 10 March 2001 | Norwich City | H | 4–1 | 15,123 | Wooter, Smith, Helguson, Nielsen |
| 13 March 2001 | Burnley | H | 0–1 | 13,653 | |
| 31 March 2001 | West Bromwich Albion | A | 0–3 | 17,261 | |
| 3 April 2001 | Nottingham Forest | H | 3–0 | 13,651 | Noel-Williams, Mooney (2) |
| 7 April 2001 | Crystal Palace | H | 2–2 | 15,598 | Nielsen, Mooney |
| 14 April 2001 | Grimsby Town | A | 1–2 | 6,110 | Mooney |
| 17 April 2001 | Wolverhampton Wanderers | H | 3–2 | 13,765 | Mooney, Smith, Helguson |
| 22 April 2001 | Preston North End | A | 2–3 | 14,071 | Noel-Williams, Page |
| 28 April 2001 | Tranmere Rovers | H | 1–1 | 16,063 | Nielsen |
| 1 May 2001 | Gillingham | A | 3–0 | 9,098 | Helguson, Smith, Vernazza |
| 6 May 2001 | Burnley | A | 0–2 | 18,283 | |

=== FA Cup ===
| Round | Date | Opponent | Venue | Result | Attendance | Goalscorers |
|---|---|---|---|---|---|---|
| R3 | 6 January 2001 | Everton | H | 1–2 | 15,635 | Mooney |

=== League Cup ===
| Round | Date | Opponent | Venue | Result | Attendance | Goalscorers |
|---|---|---|---|---|---|---|
| R1 1st Leg | 22 August 2000 | Cheltenham Town | H | 0–0 | 8,289 | |
| R1 2nd Leg | 5 September 2000 | Cheltenham Town | A | 3–0 (won 3–0 on agg) | 5,078 | Smith, Ward, Helguson |
| R2 1st Leg | 19 September 2000 | Notts County | A | 3–1 | 2,346 | Palmer, Mooney |
| R2 2nd Leg | 26 September 2000 | Notts County | H | 0–2 (won on away goals) | 7,677 | |
| R3 | 31 October 2000 | Manchester United | H | 0–3 | 18,871 | |

== Players ==
=== First-team squad ===
Squad at end of season

Note: Flags indicate national team as defined under FIFA eligibility rules; some limited exceptions apply. Players may hold more than one non-FIFA nationality.

| No. | Pos. | Nation | Player |
|---|---|---|---|
| 1 | GK | ENG | Alec Chamberlain |
| 2 | DF | ENG | Neil Cox |
| 3 | DF | ENG | Paul Robinson |
| 4 | DF | WAL | Rob Page |
| 5 | DF | ENG | Steve Palmer |
| 6 | MF | NIR | Peter Kennedy |
| 8 | MF | JAM | Micah Hyde (Note: Hyde was born in Newham, England, but also qualified to represent Jamaica internationally and made his international debut for Jamaica in 2001.) |
| 9 | FW | ENG | Tommy Mooney |
| 10 | MF | AUS | Richard Johnson |
| 11 | FW | ENG | Nick Wright |
| 12 | FW | SCO | Allan Smart |
| 13 | GK | ENG | Chris Day |
| 14 | MF | NED | Nordin Wooter (Note: Wooter was born in Paramaribo, Suriname, but also qualified to represent the Netherlands internationally and represented them at U-19 and U-21 level.) |
| 15 | FW | ENG | Gifton Noel-Williams |

| No. | Pos. | Nation | Player |
|---|---|---|---|
| 16 | DF | ENG | Nigel Gibbs (captain) |
| 17 | FW | ENG | Tommy Smith |
| 18 | FW | ISL | Heiðar Helguson |
| 19 | MF | ENG | Clint Easton |
| 21 | FW | IRL | Dominic Foley |
| 22 | GK | NOR | Espen Baardsen (Note: Baardsen was born in San Rafael, California, United States, and represented them at U-18 level, but also qualified to represent Norway internationally through his parents and made his international debut for Norway in September 1998.) |
| 23 | DF | ENG | Darren Ward |
| 25 | MF | ENG | Paolo Vernazza |
| 26 | DF | ENG | David Perpetuini |
| 27 | DF | ENG | James Panayi |
| 28 | MF | DEN | Allan Nielsen |
| 29 | MF | ENG | Stephen Armstrong |
| 33 | MF | ENG | Fabian Forde (Note: Forde was born in Harrow, England, but also qualified to represent Barbados internationally and would make his international debut for Barbados in November 2002.) |
| 34 | MF | ENG | Lee Cook |

=== Left club during season ===
Note: Flags indicate national team as defined under FIFA eligibility rules; some limited exceptions apply. Players may hold more than one non-FIFA nationality.

| No. | Pos. | Nation | Player |
|---|---|---|---|
| 7 | MF | COD | Michel Ngonge (Note: Ngonge was born in Huy, Belgium, but also qualified to represent the Democratic Republic of the Congo internationally and made his international debut for the Democratic Republic of the Congo in 1995.) (to Queens Park Rangers) |
| 7 | MF | ENG | Carlton Palmer (on loan from Coventry City) |
| 20 | MF | ISL | Jóhann Guðmundsson (to FK Lyn) |
| 25 | MF | BEL | Adrian Bakalli (to Swindon Town) |

| No. | Pos. | Nation | Player |
|---|---|---|---|
| 30 | DF | ENG | Richard Jobson (on loan from Manchester City) |
| 32 | FW | ENG | Steve Brooker (to Port Vale) |
| 36 | MF | SCO | Charlie Miller (to Dundee United) |
| — | FW | AUS | Chad Mansley (to Leyton Orient) |

=== Reserve squad ===
Note: Flags indicate national team as defined under FIFA eligibility rules; some limited exceptions apply. Players may hold more than one non-FIFA nationality.

| No. | Pos. | Nation | Player |
|---|---|---|---|
| 24 | MF | FRA | Alexandre Bonnot |
| 30 | DF | ENG | Lloyd Doyley (Note: Doyley was born in Tower Hamlets, England, but also qualified to represent Jamaica internationally and would make his international debut for Jamaica in March 2013.) |
| 31 | DF | ENG | Matthew Langston |
| 32 | DF | ENG | Tom Neill |

| No. | Pos. | Nation | Player |
|---|---|---|---|
| 35 | FW | ENG | David Warner |
| 37 | MF | ENG | Gary Fisken |
| 38 | DF | ENG | Jerel Ifil |
