= 1999–2000 Watford F.C. season =

English football team season

Watford
1999–2000 season
- Chairman: Elton John
- Manager: Graham Taylor
- Stadium: Vicarage Road
- FA Premier League: 20th (relegated)
- FA Cup: Third round
- League Cup: Third round
- Top goalscorer: Helguson (6)
- Highest home attendance: 21,590 vs. Sunderland, 27 November 1999
- Lowest home attendance: 6,628 vs. Wigan Athletic, 14 September 1999
- Average home league attendance: 18,544

During the 1999–2000 English football season, Watford competed in the FA Premier League, after successive promotions from the third and second tiers of English football.

== Season summary ==
Watford managed some encouraging early results, including victories over Liverpool and Chelsea, suggesting that experienced manager Graham Taylor might be able to keep the club in the Premier League against all expectations. However, after the victory against Chelsea on 18 September, Watford only managed three more wins all season, and it soon became obvious that this campaign was a bridge too far after two successive promotions. The club were eventually relegated with the then-lowest points total in Premier League history, although observers widely predicted that Taylor would at least stabilise the club in Division One again, and maybe even get the club to make an immediate return to the Premiership.

== Final league table ==
Pos	Team	Pld	W	D	L	GF	GA	GD	Pts	Qualification or relegation
16	Derby County	38	9	11	18	44	57	−13	38	
17	Bradford City	38	9	9	20	38	68	−30	36	Qualification for the Intertoto Cup second round
18	Wimbledon (R)	38	7	12	19	46	74	−28	33	Relegation to the Football League First Division
19	Sheffield Wednesday (R)	38	8	7	23	38	70	−32	31	Relegation to the Football League First Division
20	Watford (R)	38	6	6	26	35	77	−42	24	Relegation to the Football League First Division

Source: Premier League
Rules for classification: 1) points; 2) goal difference; 3) number of goals scored.
(R) Relegated

Results summary

Overall								Home						Away					
Pld	W	D	L	GF	GA	GD	Pts	W	D	L	GF	GA	GD	W	D	L	GF	GA	GD
38	6	6	26	35	77	−42	24	5	4	10	24	31	−7	1	2	16	11	46	−35

Source: Statto

Results by matchday

Matchday	1	2	3	4	5	6	7	8	9	10	11	12	13	14	15	16	17	18	19	20	21	22	23	24	25	26	27	28	29	30	31	32	33	34	35	36	37	38
Result	L	L	W	W	L	L	L	W	L	L	L	L	L	D	D	L	L	L	L	W	L	L	L	L	D	L	L	L	W	D	L	D	L	L	L	L	D	W
Position	13	19	14	9	11	15	15	14	14	15	16	18	19	19	19	19	19	19	19	19	19	19	20	20	20	20	20	20	20	20	20	20	20	20	20	20	20	20

Source: Statto.com
W = Win; D = Draw; L = Loss

== Results ==
Watford's score comes first

=== Legend ===
Win	Draw	Loss

=== FA Premier League ===
Date	Opponent	Venue	Result	Attendance	Scorers
7 August 1999	Wimbledon	H	2–3	15,511	Kennedy (pen), Ngonge
10 August 1999	Sunderland	A	0–2	40,630	
14 August 1999	Liverpool	A	1–0	44,174	Mooney
21 August 1999	Bradford City	H	1–0	15,564	Mooney
24 August 1999	Aston Villa	H	0–1	19,161	
30 August 1999	Leicester City	A	0–1	17,920	
11 September 1999	West Ham United	A	0–1	25,310	
18 September 1999	Chelsea	H	1–0	21,144	Smart
25 September 1999	Arsenal	A	0–1	38,127	
3 October 1999	Leeds United	H	1–2	19,677	Williams
16 October 1999	Manchester United	A	1–4	55,188	Johnson
24 October 1999	Middlesbrough	H	1–3	16,081	Smith
31 October 1999	Coventry City	A	0–4	21,700	
6 November 1999	Sheffield Wednesday	A	2–2	21,658	Ngonge, Page
20 November 1999	Newcastle United	H	1–1	19,539	Ngonge
27 November 1999	Sunderland	H	2–3	21,590	Ngonge, Johnson (pen)
4 December 1999	Wimbledon	A	0–5	14,021	
18 December 1999	Everton	H	1–3	17,346	Ngonge
26 December 1999	Tottenham Hotspur	A	0–4	36,089	
28 December 1999	Southampton	H	3–2	18,459	Perpetuini, Gravelaine (2)
3 January 2000	Derby County	A	0–2	28,072	
15 January 2000	Liverpool	H	2–3	21,367	Johnson, Helguson
22 January 2000	Bradford City	A	2–3	16,864	Hyde, Helguson
5 February 2000	Aston Villa	A	0–4	27,647	
12 February 2000	Leicester City	H	1–1	16,814	Wooter
26 February 2000	Chelsea	A	1–2	34,928	Smart
4 March 2000	West Ham United	H	1–2	18,619	Helguson
11 March 2000	Newcastle United	A	0–1	36,433	
18 March 2000	Sheffield Wednesday	H	1–0	15,840	Smart
25 March 2000	Tottenham Hotspur	H	1–1	20,050	Smart
1 April 2000	Everton	A	2–4	31,960	Smart, Hyde
8 April 2000	Derby County	H	0–0	16,579	
15 April 2000	Southampton	A	0–2	15,252	
23 April 2000	Arsenal	H	2–3	19,670	Helguson, Hyde
29 April 2000	Manchester United	H	2–3	20,250	Helguson, Smith
3 May 2000	Leeds United	A	1–3	36,324	Foley
6 May 2000	Middlesbrough	A	1–1	32,930	Ward
14 May 2000	Coventry City	H	1–0	18,977	Helguson

=== FA Cup ===
Round	Date	Opponent	Venue	Result	Attendance	Goalscorers
R3	11 December 1999	Birmingham City	H	0–1	8,144	

=== League Cup ===
Round	Date	Opponent	Venue	Result	Attendance	Goalscorers
R2 1st Leg	14 September 1999	Wigan Athletic	H	2–0	6,628	Easton, Hyde
R2 2nd Leg	21 September 1999	Wigan Athletic	A	1–3 (won on away goals)	5,006	Kennedy
R3	13 October 1999	Middlesbrough	A	0–1	8,843	

== Players ==
=== First-team squad ===
Squad at end of season

Note: Flags indicate national team as defined under FIFA eligibility rules; some limited exceptions apply. Players may hold more than one non-FIFA nationality.

No.	Pos.	Nation	Player
1	GK	ENG	Alec Chamberlain
2	DF	ENG	Des Lyttle
3	DF	NIR	Peter Kennedy
4	DF	WAL	Rob Page (captain)
5	DF	ENG	Steve Palmer
6	DF	ENG	Paul Robinson
7	FW	COD	Michel Ngonge (Note: Ngonge was born in Huy, Belgium, but also qualified to represent the Democratic Republic of the Congo internationally and made his international debut for the Democratic Republic of the Congo in 1995.)
8	MF	ENG	Micah Hyde (Note: Hyde was born in Newham, England, but also qualified to represent Jamaica internationally and would make his international debut for Jamaica in 2001.)
9	FW	ENG	Tommy Mooney
10	MF	AUS	Richard Johnson
11	FW	ENG	Nick Wright
12	FW	SCO	Allan Smart
13	GK	ENG	Chris Day
14	MF	NED	Nordin Wooter (Note: Wooter was born in Paramaribo, Suriname, but also qualifies to represent the Netherlands internationally and has represented them at U-19 and U-21 level.)
15	FW	ENG	Gifton Noel-Williams
16	DF	ENG	Nigel Gibbs

No.	Pos.	Nation	Player
17	FW	ENG	Tommy Smith
19	MF	ENG	Clint Easton
20	MF	ISL	Jóhann Guðmundsson
23	DF	ENG	Darren Ward
24	MF	FRA	Alexandre Bonnot
25	MF	BEL	Adrian Bakalli
26	DF	ENG	David Perpetuini
27	DF	ENG	James Panayi
31	FW	ENG	Steve Brooker
32	DF	NIR	Mark Williams (Note: Williams was born in Stalybridge, England, but also qualified to represent Northern Ireland internationally and made his international debut for Northern Ireland in 1999.)
33	FW	IRL	Dominic Foley
34	GK	AUT	Herwig Walker
35	MF	SCO	Charlie Miller
36	DF	ENG	Neil Cox
37	FW	ISL	Heiðar Helguson

=== Left club during season ===
Note: Flags indicate national team as defined under FIFA eligibility rules; some limited exceptions apply. Players may hold more than one non-FIFA nationality.

No.	Pos.	Nation	Player
18	DF	NGR	Benedict Iroha (retired)
21	DF	ENG	Keith Millen (to Bristol City)
21	MF	FRA	Xavier Gravelaine (to Le Havre)

No.	Pos.	Nation	Player
28	DF	ENG	Colin Miles (to Greenock Morton)
42	MF	ENG	Stuart Slater (to Carlton SC)

=== Reserve squad ===
Note: Flags indicate national team as defined under FIFA eligibility rules; some limited exceptions apply. Players may hold more than one non-FIFA nationality.

No.	Pos.	Nation	Player
22	DF	ENG	Dean Yates
29	MF	ENG	Lee Johnson
30	MF	ENG	Lee Cook
38	DF	ENG	Jerel Ifil

No.	Pos.	Nation	Player
39	MF	ENG	Matthew Langston
40	MF	ENG	Gary Fisken
41	MF	ENG	Danny Grieves
43	FW	ENG	David Warner

== Transfers ==
=== In ===
Date	Pos.	Name	From	Fee
7 July 1999	DF	Mark Williams	Chesterfield	Free
8 July 1999	DF	Des Lyttle	Nottingham Forest	Free
9 July 1999	FW	Dominic Foley	Wolverhampton Wanderers	Free
1 August 1999	MF	Alexandre Bonnot	Angers	Free
6 August 1999	GK	Herwig Walker	Vorwärts Steyr	Free
13 September 1999	MF	Nordin Wooter	Real Zaragoza	£950,000
29 September 1999	MF	Charlie Miller	Rangers	£450,000
1 November 1999	MF	Lee Cook	Aylesbury	Free
4 November 1999	DF	Neil Cox	Bolton Wanderers	£500,000
9 November 1999	MF	Xavier Gravelaine	Paris Saint-Germain	Free
2 January 2000	FW	David Warner	Brook House	Free
11 January 2000	FW	Heiðar Helguson	Lillestrøm	£1,500,000

=== Out ===
Date	Pos.	Name	To	Fee
22 June 1999	MF	Tony Daley	Walsall	Free transfer
6 July 1999	DF	Darren Bazeley	Wolverhampton Wanderers	Free
6 August 1999	DF	Alon Hazan	F.C. Ashdod	Free
18 August 1999	MF	Stuart Slater	Carlton SC	Free
11 November 1999	DF	Keith Millen	Bristol City	£35,000
29 January 2000	MF	Xavier Gravelaine	Le Havre	£300,000
5 February 2000	DF	Colin Miles	Greenock Morton	Free

Transfers in: ▼£3,400,000
Transfers out: ▲£335,000
Total spending: ▼£3,065,000

== Statistics ==
=== Appearances ===
As of 14 May 2000

No.	Pos	Nat	Player	Total		Premier League		FA Cup		League Cup	
No.	Pos	Nat	Player	Apps	Goals	Apps	Goals	Apps	Goals	Apps	Goals
1	GK	(England) ENG	Alec Chamberlain	31	0	27	0	1	0	3	0
2	DF	(England) ENG	Des Lyttle	12	0	11	0	0	0	1	0
3	DF	(Northern Ireland) NIR	Peter Kennedy	21	2	17+1	1	0	0	3	1
4	DF	(Wales) WAL	Rob Page	40	1	36	1	1	0	3	0
5	DF	(England) ENG	Steve Palmer	42	0	38	0	1	0	3	0
6	DF	(England) ENG	Paul Robinson	36	0	29+3	0	1	0	3	0
7	FW	(Democratic Republic of the Congo) COD	Michel Ngonge	27	5	16+7	5	1	0	2+1	0
8	MF	(England) ENG	Micah Hyde	38	4	33+1	3	1	0	3	1
9	FW	(England) ENG	Tommy Mooney	13	2	8+4	2	0	0	1	0
10	MF	(Australia) AUS	Richard Johnson	25	3	20+3	3	1	0	1	0
11	FW	(England) ENG	Nick Wright	6	0	1+3	0	1	0	1	0
12	FW	(Scotland) SCO	Allan Smart	16	5	13+1	5	0	0	1+1	0
13	GK	(England) ENG	Chris Day	11	0	11	0	0	0	0	0
14	FW	(Netherlands) NED	Nordin Wooter	22	1	16+4	1	1	0	1	0
15	FW	(England) ENG	Gifton Noel-Williams	3	0	1+2	0	0	0	0	0
16	DF	(England) ENG	Nigel Gibbs	20	0	11+6	0	0+1	0	2	0
17	FW	(England) ENG	Tommy Smith	23	2	13+9	2	0	0	0+1	0
19	MF	(England) ENG	Clint Easton	19	1	13+4	0	0	0	1+1	1
20	MF	(Iceland) ISL	Johann Gudmundsson	11	0	1+8	0	0+1	0	0+1	0
21	MF	(France) FRA	Xavier Gravelaine	7	2	7	2	0	0	0	0
23	DF	(England) ENG	Darren Ward	9	1	7+2	1	0	0	0	0
24	MF	(France) FRA	Alex Bonnot	12	0	7+5	0	0	0	0	0
25	MF	(Belgium) BEL	Adrian Bakalli	2	0	0+2	0	0	0	0	0
26	DF	(England) ENG	David Perpetuini	13	1	12+1	1	0	0	0	0
27	DF	(England) ENG	James Panayi	2	0	2	0	0	0	0	0
31	FW	(England) ENG	Steve Brooker	2	0	0+1	0	0+1	0	0	0
32	MF	(Northern Ireland) NIR	Mark Williams	24	1	20+2	1	0	0	2	0
33	FW	(Republic of Ireland) IRL	Dominic Foley	13	1	5+7	1	0	0	0+1	0
35	MF	(Scotland) SCO	Charlie Miller	16	0	9+5	0	1	0	1	0
36	DF	(England) ENG	Neil Cox	22	0	20+1	0	1	0	0	0
37	FW	(Iceland) ISL	Heidar Helguson	16	6	14+2	6	0	0	0	0

=== Starting 11 ===
Considering starts in all competitions
Considering a 5-3-2 formation

- GK: #1, (England) Alec Chamberlain, 31
- RWB: #36, (England) Neil Cox, 21
- CB: #5, (England) Steve Palmer, 42
- CB: #4, (Wales) Rob Page, 40
- CB: #32, (Northern Ireland) Mark Williams, 22
- LWB: #6, (England) Paul Robinson, 33
- CM: #8, (England) Micah Hyde, 37
- CM: #10, (Australia) Richard Johnson, 22
- CM: #3, (Northern Ireland) Peter Kennedy, 20
- CF: #7, (Democratic Republic of the Congo) Michel Ngonge, 19
- CF: #14, (Netherlands) Nordin Wooter, 18
