= 1999 Football League First Division play-off final =

Association football match in London

- The match took place at Wembley Stadium.
Bolton Wanderers	Watford
0	2
- Date: 31 May 1999
- Venue: Wembley Stadium, London
- Referee: Terry Heilbron (Newton Aycliffe)
- Attendance: 70,343

The 1999 Football League First Division play-off final was an association football match which was played on 31 May 1999 at Wembley Stadium, London, between Bolton Wanderers and Watford. The match was to determine the third and final team to gain promotion from the Football League First Division, the second tier of English football, to the Premier League. The top two teams of the 1998–99 Football League First Division season gained automatic promotion to the Premier League, while those from third to sixth place in the table took part in play-off semi-finals; Bolton Wanderers ended the season fifth in the table, one position and one point ahead of Watford. The winners of these semi-finals competed for the final place for the 1999–2000 season in the Premier League. Birmingham City and Ipswich Town were the losing semi-finalists. Winning the final was estimated to be worth up to £10 million to the successful team.

The 1999 final was played in front of a crowd of 70,343 and was refereed by Terry Heilbron. Nick Wright put Watford ahead late in the first half with an overhead kick. Allan Smart doubled their lead with two minutes remaining and Watford won the match 2–0. As a result, Watford would play in the Premier League for the first time since its inception in the 1992–93 season. It also meant that Watford were promoted for the second successive season, having been champions of Division Two in the 1997–98 season. Elton John, Watford's chairman, watched the final from Seattle.

Watford were considered favourites for relegation the following season and finished bottom of the Premier League, 12 points from safety, having lost 26 of their 38 matches: they were relegated back to the First Division. Bolton ended their next season in sixth place in the First Division to qualify for the play-offs where they lost in the semi-finals to Ipswich Town.

== Route to the final ==
Football League First Division final table, leading positions
Pos	Team	Pld	W	D	L	GF	GA	GD	Pts
1	Sunderland	46	31	12	3	91	28	+63	105
2	Bradford City	46	26	9	11	82	47	+35	87
3	Ipswich Town	46	26	8	12	69	32	+37	86
4	Birmingham City	46	23	12	11	66	37	+29	81
5	Watford	46	21	14	11	65	56	+9	77
6	Bolton Wanderers	46	20	16	10	78	59	+19	76

Watford finished the regular 1998–99 season in fifth position in the Football League First Division, the second tier of the English football league system, one place and one point ahead of Bolton Wanderers. Both therefore missed out on the two automatic places for promotion to the Premier League and instead took part in the play-offs, along with Ipswich Town and Birmingham City, to determine the third promoted team. Watford finished ten points behind Bradford City (who were promoted in second place) and twenty-eight behind league winners Sunderland.

Bolton's opponents for their play-off semi-final were Ipswich Town, with the first match of the two-legged tie being played on 16 May 2001 at the Reebok Stadium in Bolton. The visitors had a penalty appeal turned down by the referee late in the first half when Mark Fish appeared to trip David Johnson and the first half ended goalless. With six minutes of the match remaining, Michael Johansen volleyed the ball into the Ipswich goal, securing a 1–0 first-leg victory. The second leg took place at Ipswich's Portman Road three days later. The home team took the lead with a goal from Matt Holland on 14 minutes, but the score on the day was level after Bob Taylor's close-range shot went in. Ipswich were ahead once again one minute later through Kieron Dyer but a deflected strike by Per Frandsen made the score 2–2 with seven minutes remaining. Dyer's 90th minute headed goal made it 3–2 to Ipswich and level on aggregate, taking the match into extra time. Taylor scored his second and Bolton's third in the 96th minute, and Holland's 20-yard (18 m) strike made it 4–3 to Ipswich in the 116th minute. The tie ended 4–4 on aggregate with Bolton progressing to the final via the away goals rule.

Watford faced Birmingham City in their play-off semi-final and played the first leg at their home ground of Vicarage Road on 16 May 1999. After five minutes, Watford took the lead when Michel Ngonge headed Peter Kennedy's cross into the bottom corner of the Birmingham City goal to make it 1–0. Before half-time, Birmingham City's Chris Holland hit the outside of the post with a long-distance strike and Nick Wright's lob for Watford hit the crossbar. Midway through the second half, Tommy Mooney's header hit the Watford bar before Paul Robinson was sent off for receiving a second yellow card for a foul on Peter Ndlovu. No further goals were scored and the match ended 1–0 to Watford. The return match was played at St Andrew's in Birmingham four days later. Dele Adebola opened the scoring for Birmingham City after two minutes but David Holdsworth was sent off with more than an hour of the match remaining for a second yellow card. The first half ended 1–0, 1–1 on aggregate, and remained unchanged by the end of regular time. Half an hour of extra time went goalless forcing the match to be decided by a penalty shootout. At 6–6 with one penalty missed by each team, Watford's Alon Hazan put them ahead before Holland's miss condemned Birmingham City to defeat and sent Watford to the final.

== Match ==
=== Background ===
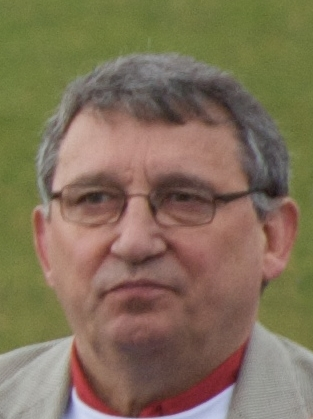
Watford manager Graham Taylor had last managed a team at Wembley in 1993 when he was in charge of England.

This was Bolton's second appearance in the second tier play-off final; they had beaten Reading 4–3 after extra time in the 1995 final. Watford were making their first appearance in the second tier play-off final, but had lost to Blackburn Rovers in the 1989 play-off semi-finals. Bolton were aiming to make an immediate return to the top tier of English football having been relegated from the Premier League in the 1997–98 season on goal difference. Conversely, Watford were seeking back-to-back promotions, after ending the previous season as champions of the Second Division (third tier). They had been outside the top tier for eleven years. In the two regular season meetings between the two clubs, Watford had won both, defeating Bolton 2–1 at the Reebok Stadium in October 1998 and 2–0 at Vicarage Road the following April. Graham Taylor, the Watford manager, was making his first visit to Wembley Stadium since September 1993 in his last game as England manager. Reflecting on Watford's appearance at the national stadium in the 1984 FA Cup Final, he suggested: "There are two ways to go to Wembley. You either go as Watford did against Everton ... just happy to be there. Or you go to win." Elton John, Watford's chairman, also spoke similarly of the 1984 final: "Yes, we desperately wanted to win ... but there was something about getting there which was a victory in its own right for a relatively small club like ours". He went on to suggest that both Taylor and his team had an "overwhelming determination" to succeed in the play-off final.

Bolton's top scorer in the league was Bob Taylor who had fifteen goals for the season. Gifton Noel-Williams was Watford's leading marksman with ten league goals, but had not featured for his club since suffering a fractured hip in January. Mooney was second in the list of Watford's top scorers with nine league goals. The match was broadcast live in the UK on Sky Sports 2 with highlights shown later that evening on ITV. According to bookmakers Coral and Littlewoods, Bolton were favourites to win the match. The match was estimated in the media to be worth around £10 million to the winning team. The referee for the match was Terry Heilbron from Newton Aycliffe in County Durham.

=== First half ===
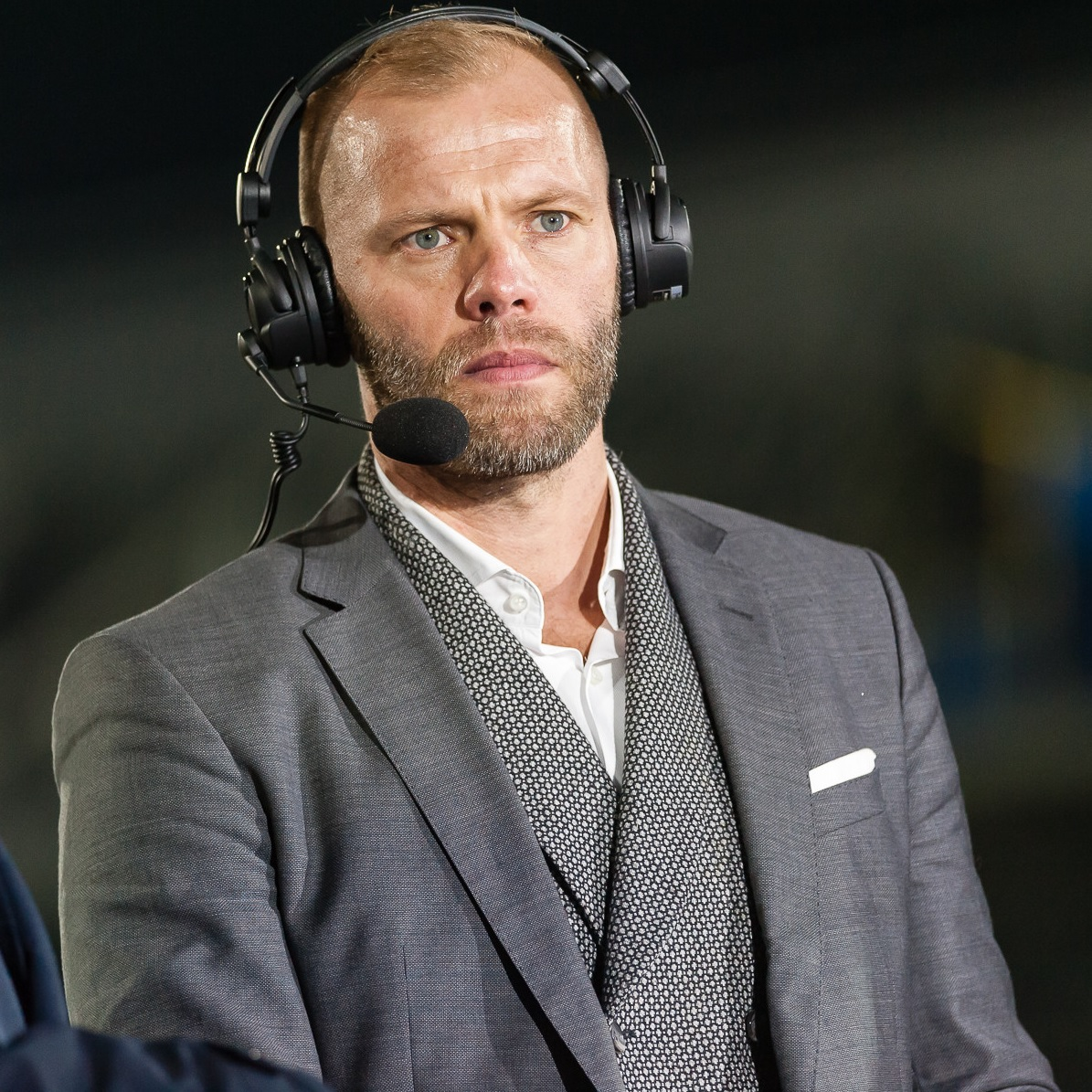
Eiður Guðjohnsen (pictured in 2018) had several chances to score.

Watford kicked off the match at 3 p.m. on 31 May 1999 in front of a Wembley Stadium crowd of 70,343. Bolton adopted a 4–4–2 formation while Watford played as 4–3–3. In the second minute, Claus Jensen's pass was cleared by Watford, and a minute later a Bolton corner was also defended. Four minutes later Taylor took the ball clear and his shot from 20 yards (18 m), under challenge from Rob Page, was straight at Alec Chamberlain in the Watford goal. Bolton dominated the midfield but in the eleventh minute Steve Palmer's long ball forward was allowed to bounce allowing Kennedy to shoot but the ball went high over the bar. On 13 minutes, Eiður Guðjohnsen was challenged by both Robinson and Page, but the ball fell to Johansen whose shot went across the face of Watford's goal. Four minutes later, a foul from Robbie Elliott drew a free kick which was taken by Kennedy, with Steve Banks saving from Mooney. In the 19th minute, Guðjohnsen's shot was gathered by Chamberlain, despite the goalkeeper losing his footing.

Six minutes later, Guðjohnsen set off on a counter-attack, beating Robinson to go one-on-one with Chamberlain, but shot just wide of the right-hand post. In the 30th minute, a free kick from Elliott broke to Guðjohnsen whose shot from around the penalty spot was parried by Chamberlain. Seven minutes later, Watford's Darren Bazeley beat both Gardner and Elliott to win a corner. From the set piece, Neil Cox headed the ball clear, which fell to Wright whose overhead kick flew into the Bolton goal, making it 1–0 to Watford. The BBC described it as "one of the best goals seen in a play-off final". In the 39th minute, Frandsen's free kick was saved by Chamberlain but had to be retaken, the second strike being cleared. In the final minute of the half, Guðjohnsen's curled shot went past Watford's left-hand post.

=== Second half ===
No changes were made by either side during the break and Bolton kicked off the second half. Six minutes in, Guðjohnsen's header dropped in front of Taylor who fouled Chamberlain in pursuit of a shot. In the 56th minute Guðjohnsen had another chance after breaking free but the ball was cleared by Page. A minute later, Micah Hyde was shown the first yellow card of the match for tugging an opponent's shirt. In the 61st minute, a cross from Gardner was cleared off the line by Watford's Palmer. Two subsequent corners from Bolton were defended by Watford. Five minutes later, Bolton made the first substitution of the game with Scott Sellars coming on to replace Johansen. On 68 minutes, a header from Mooney went close.

With fifteen minutes of the game remaining, Bolton counter-attacked and Cox shot wide from a Taylor pass. Watford then made their first change of the afternoon, Ngonge being replaced by Allan Smart. Two minutes later, Wright's ball to Mooney was struck across the Bolton goal. Kennedy then shot wide of Banks from a corner, before Frandsen's shot was straight at Chamberlain. With five minutes to go, Guðjohnsen beat Palmer but his poked shot round the Watford goalkeeper went wide. A minute later, Guðjohnsen's shot was saved by Chamberlain before a 50-yard (46 m) run from Cox resulted in him shooting high and wide. In the 88th minute, Watford made their second change, Hazan coming on to replace Wright. In the 89th minute, Watford doubled their lead: Kennedy won the ball from Sellars and passed it to Smart who side-footed it past Banks. The match ended 2–0 and saw Watford secure back-to-back promotions.

=== Details ===
31 May 1999
15:00

Bolton Wanderers	0–2	Watford
	Report	Wright 38'; Smart 89'

Wembley Stadium, London
Attendance: 70,343
Referee: Terry Heilbron

Bolton Wanderers	Watford

Bolton Wanderers:
GK	1	Steve Banks
RB	2	Neil Cox (substituted off) 89'
LB	3	Robbie Elliott (yellow card)
CM	4	Per Frandsen
CB	5	Andy Todd
CB	6	Mark Fish
RM	7	Michael Johansen (substituted off) 66'
CM	8	Claus Jensen
CF	9	Eiður Guðjohnsen
CF	10	Bob Taylor
LM	11	Ricardo Gardner
Substitutes:
MF	12	Bo Hansen (substituted on) 89'
MF	13	Scott Sellars (substituted on) 66'
DF	14	Guðni Bergsson
Manager:
Colin Todd

Watford:
GK	1	Alec Chamberlain
RB	2	Darren Bazeley
LM	3	Peter Kennedy
CB	4	Rob Page
CB	5	Steve Palmer
LB	6	Paul Robinson
FW	7	Michel Ngonge (substituted off) 75'
CM	8	Micah Hyde (yellow card) 57'
CF	9	Tommy Mooney
CM	10	Richard Johnson
RM	11	Nick Wright (substituted off) 87'
Substitutes:
FW	12	Allan Smart (substituted on) 75'
GK	13	Chris Day
MF	14	Alon Hazan (substituted on) 87'
Manager:
Graham Taylor

== Post-match ==
After the game, Taylor was jubilant: "I always thought I would get back to the top ... I would have gone abroad if I thought I wouldn't have been able to get back in. The England job caused me great problems ... but now I'm back at the highest level". Todd, the losing manager, noted: "The first 20 minutes of any game is important and I thought we settled well. But it's not about 20 minutes – it's about 90 and we didn't stamp any authority on the game". Elton John, who had watched the match live from Seattle, said: "I have never seen a Watford team play with such passion ... I can't thank Graham enough for what he has done for me". He went on to praise Taylor's management: "We have one of the greatest managers to have ever graced the English game". It was the fifth time that Watford had secured promotion under the management of Taylor.

Watford were immediately installed by William Hill, the bookmakers, as odds on for relegation from the Premier League the following season and declared favourites to do so by Ian Parkes writing in the Irish Independent; the club finished bottom of the Premier League, 12 points from safety, losing 26 of their 38 matches. Bolton ended their next season in sixth place in the First Division, qualifying for the play-offs, where they lost in the semi-finals to Ipswich Town.
