= 1997–98 Watford F.C. season =

English football team season

Watford
1997–98 season
- Chairman: Elton John
- Manager: Graham Taylor
- Stadium: Vicarage Road
- Second Division: 1st (champions)
- FA Cup: Third round
- League Cup: Second round
- Auto Windscreens Shield: First round
- Top goalscorer: League: Kennedy (11); All: Kennedy (13)
- Average home league attendance: 11,532

During the 1997–98 English football season, Watford F.C. competed in the Football League Second Division.

== Season summary ==
In the 1997–98 season, Kenny Jackett was demoted to the position of assistant manager and Graham Taylor returned for a second spell as Watford manager. The transition proved a success; Watford secured the Division Two title, beating Bristol City into second place after a season-long struggle.

== Final league table ==
Pos	Team	Pld	W	D	L	GF	GA	GD	Pts	Promotion or relegation
1	Watford (C, P)	46	24	16	6	67	41	+26	88	Promotion to the First Division
2	Bristol City (P)	46	25	10	11	69	39	+30	85	Promotion to the First Division
3	Grimsby Town (O, P)	46	19	15	12	55	37	+18	72	Qualification for the Second Division play-offs
4	Northampton Town	46	18	17	11	52	37	+15	71	Qualification for the Second Division play-offs
5	Bristol Rovers	46	20	10	16	70	64	+6	70	Qualification for the Second Division play-offs

Rules for classification: In the Football League goals scored (GF) takes precedence over goal difference (GD).
(C) Champions; (O) Play-off winners; (P) Promoted

== Results ==
Watford's score comes first

=== Legend ===
Win	Draw	Loss

=== Football League Second Division ===
Date	Opponent	Venue	Result	Attendance	Scorers
9 August 1997	Burnley	H	1–0	11,155	Lee
16 August 1997	Carlisle United	A	2–0	7,395	Kennedy, Johnson
23 August 1997	Brentford	H	3–1	10,125	Millen, Melvang, Johnson
30 August 1997	Preston North End	A	0–2	11,042	
2 September 1997	Plymouth Argyle	A	1–0	5,141	Noel-Williams
7 September 1997	Wycombe Wanderers	H	2–1	12,100	Hyde, Lee
13 September 1997	Chesterfield	H	2–1	11,204	Rosenthal, Lee
20 September 1997	Gillingham	A	2–2	7,780	Rosenthal (pen), Johnson
27 September 1997	York City	H	1–1	13,812	Lee
4 October 1997	Luton Town	A	4–0	9,041	Johnson, Thomas, Kennedy (2)
14 October 1997	Bristol Rovers	A	2–1	8,110	Kennedy, Rosenthal (pen)
18 October 1997	Millwall	H	0–1	12,530	
21 October 1997	Fulham	H	2–0	11,486	Rosenthal, Robinson
25 October 1997	Grimsby Town	A	1–0	5,699	Rosenthal
1 November 1997	Blackpool	H	4–1	9,723	Lee (2), Johnson, Rosenthal
4 November 1997	Southend United	A	3–0	4,001	Kennedy (3)
8 November 1997	Walsall	A	0–0	5,077	
18 November 1997	Oldham Athletic	H	2–1	8,397	Thomas, Mooney
22 November 1997	Northampton Town	A	1–0	7,373	Kennedy
29 November 1997	Wigan Athletic	H	2–1	9,455	Thomas, Mooney
2 December 1997	Wrexham	A	1–1	3,702	Rosenthal
13 December 1997	Bristol City	H	1–1	16,072	Noel-Williams
20 December 1997	Bournemouth	A	1–0	6,081	Kennedy
26 December 1997	Wycombe Wanderers	A	0–0	8,090	
28 December 1997	Plymouth Argyle	H	1–1	11,594	Mooney
10 January 1998	Burnley	A	0–2	9,551	
17 January 1998	Preston North End	H	3–1	10,182	Kennedy (2), Hyde
24 January 1998	Brentford	A	2–1	6,969	Mooney, Johnson
31 January 1998	Chesterfield	A	1–0	5,975	Noel-Williams
8 February 1998	Gillingham	H	0–2	10,498	
14 February 1998	Luton Town	H	1–1	15,182	Robinson
21 February 1998	York City	A	1–1	4,890	Palmer
25 February 1998	Millwall	A	1–1	7,126	Mooney
28 February 1998	Bristol Rovers	H	3–2	12,186	Noel-Williams, Rosenthal, Mooney
3 March 1998	Walsall	H	1–2	8,096	Noel-Williams
7 March 1998	Blackpool	A	1–1	5,237	Bazeley
14 March 1998	Southend United	H	1–1	10,750	Hyde
17 March 1998	Carlisle United	H	2–1	7,274	Palmer, Bazeley
21 March 1998	Oldham Athletic	A	2–2	5,744	Bazeley, Gibbs
28 March 1998	Northampton Town	H	1–1	14,268	Johnson
4 April 1998	Wigan Athletic	A	2–3	4,262	Foley, Hyde
11 April 1998	Wrexham	H	1–0	12,340	Lee
13 April 1998	Bristol City	A	1–1	19,141	Lee
25 April 1998	Grimsby Town	H	0–0	14,002	
28 April 1998	Bournemouth	H	2–1	12,834	Lee, Noel-Williams
2 May 1998	Fulham	A	2–1	17,114	Noel-Williams, Lee

=== FA Cup ===
Round	Date	Opponent	Venue	Result	Attendance	Goalscorers
R1	15 November 1997	Barnet	A	2–1	4,040	Rosenthal (2)
R2	6 December 1997	Torquay United	A	1–1	3,416	Noel-Williams
R2R	16 December 1997	Torquay United	H	2–1 (a.e.t.)	5,848	Noel-Williams (2)
R3	3 January 1998	Sheffield Wednesday	H	1–1	18,306	Kennedy
R3R	14 January 1998	Sheffield Wednesday	A	0–0 (lost 3–5 on pens)	18,707	

=== League Cup ===
Round	Date	Opponent	Venue	Result	Attendance	Goalscorers
R1 1st Leg	13 August 1997	Swindon Town	A	2–0	6,271	Noel-Williams, Rosenthal
R1 2nd Leg	26 August 1997	Swindon Town	H	1–1 (won 3–1 on agg)	7,712	Hyde
R2 1st Leg	16 September 1997	Sheffield United	H	1–1	7,154	Kennedy
R2 2nd Leg	23 September 1997	Sheffield United	A	0–4 (lost 1–5 on agg)	7,511	

=== Football League Trophy ===
Round	Date	Opponent	Venue	Result	Attendance	Goalscorers
SR1	9 December 1997	Fulham	A	0–1	3,364	

== Players ==
=== First-team squad ===
Squad at end of season

Note: Flags indicate national team as defined under FIFA eligibility rules; some limited exceptions apply. Players may hold more than one non-FIFA nationality.

No.	Pos.	Nation	Player
—	GK	(England) ENG	Alec Chamberlain
—	GK	(England) ENG	Chris Day
—	GK	(England) ENG	Andrew Iga
—	DF	(England) ENG	Darren Bazeley
—	DF	(England) ENG	Clint Easton
—	DF	(England) ENG	Nigel Gibbs
—	DF	(England) ENG	Dominic Ludden
—	DF	(England) ENG	Colin Miles
—	DF	(England) ENG	Keith Millen
—	DF	(England) ENG	Steve Palmer
—	DF	(England) ENG	Paul Robinson
—	DF	(England) ENG	Mark Rooney
—	DF	(England) ENG	Darren Ward
—	DF	(Wales) WAL	Rob Page
—	DF	(Denmark) DEN	Lars Melvang
—	MF	(England) ENG	Micah Hyde (Note: Hyde was born in Newham, England, but also qualified to represent Jamaica internationally and would make his international debut for Jamaica in 2001.)

No.	Pos.	Nation	Player
—	MF	(England) ENG	Stuart Slater
—	MF	(England) ENG	Tommy Smith
—	MF	(England) ENG	Steve Talboys
—	MF	(Northern Ireland) NIR	Peter Kennedy
—	MF	(Iceland) ISL	Jóhann Guðmundsson
—	MF	(Israel) ISR	Alon Hazan
—	MF	(Australia) AUS	Richard Johnson
—	FW	(England) ENG	Wayne Andrews
—	FW	(England) ENG	Jason Lee
—	FW	(England) ENG	Nathan Lowndes
—	FW	(England) ENG	Tommy Mooney
—	FW	(England) ENG	Gifton Noel-Williams
—	FW	(Wales) WAL	Dai Thomas
—	FW	(Republic of Ireland) IRL	Dominic Foley (on loan from Wolverhampton Wanderers)
—	FW	(Israel) ISR	Ronny Rosenthal

=== Reserve squad ===
Note: Flags indicate national team as defined under FIFA eligibility rules; some limited exceptions apply. Players may hold more than one non-FIFA nationality.

No. / Pos. / Nation / Player; — / DF / (England) ENG / David Perpetuini	No. / Pos. / Nation / Player; — / FW / (England) ENG / Danny Grieves
