= Fisken =

Fisken is a surname. Notable people with the surname include:

- Archibald Fisken (1897–1970), Australian politician
- Gary Fisken (born 1981), English footballer
- Geoffrey Fisken (1916–2011), New Zealand fighter pilot
- Gregor Fisken (born 1964), British racing driver and businessman
- William Fisken (died 1883), Scottish presbyterian minister
