= Micah Hyde (footballer) =

Jamaican footballer (born 1974)

Personal information
- Full name: Micah Anthony Hyde
- Date of birth: 10 November 1974 (age 51)
- Place of birth: Upton Park, England
- Height: 5 ft 9 in (1.75 m)
- Position: Midfielder

Team information
- Current team: Queens Park Rangers (Under 18's Head coach)

Youth career
- Brimsdown Rovers
- –1993: Cambridge United

Senior career*
Years	Team	Apps	(Gls)
1993–1997	Cambridge United	107	(13)
1995	→ Euran Pallo (loan)	10	(3)
1997–2004	Watford	253	(24)
2004–2007	Burnley	102	(1)
2007–2008	Peterborough United	64	(0)
2009	Woking	4	(0)
2009–2010	Barnet	41	(1)
2010–2011	Billericay Town		
2011	Aveley		
2011–2012	St Albans City	31	(2)
2016	Ware	1	(0)
Total		613	(44)

International career
2001–2004	Jamaica	17	(1)

Managerial career
- 2020–: Queens Park Rangers Under 18s
- * Club domestic league appearances and goals

Micah Anthony Hyde (born 10 November 1974) is a coach and former professional footballer who played as a midfielder. He is Head Coach for Queens Park Rangers Under 18s.

He played for Cambridge United and Finnish club Euran Pallo before joining Watford. He made more than 250 league appearances for Watford between 1997 and 2004, and played in the Premier League during the 1999–2000 season. He went on to play for Burnley and Peterborough United before slipping out of professional football in 2009 where he joined Conference Premier side Woking. He briefly returned to the Football League with Barnet before returning to finish his career in non-league with Billericay Town, Aveley and St Albans City.

Hyde was born in England, and made 17 appearances for Jamaica, scoring once.

Hyde came out of retirement in January 2016 signing for Southern Football League side Ware, managed by Ken Charlery.

== Club career ==
Born in Upton Park in the London Borough of Newham, he played for the youth team of Brimsdown Rovers alongside David Beckham. He joined Watford in 1997 after a move from Cambridge United. Having made well over 200 appearances for Watford, he was sold to Burnley in mid-2004, scoring on his debut against Sheffield United.

Hyde became an established Championship player and was largely considered one of Burnley's most consistent performers over the last two years. His hard-working play in the centre of the park made him almost ever-present in the side. In the 2004–05 season, he ensured himself of a place in Burnley's history when he scored the equalising goal away at Blackburn Rovers, Burnley's local rivals, in a FA Cup game. At the end of the 2005–06 season, he was placed on the transfer list by Burnley manager Steve Cotterill along with three other players; Gifton Noel-Williams, Danny Karbassiyoon and Duane Courtney, but due to his efforts in pre-season was once again welcomed back to the first-team squad and taken off the list.

On 11 January 2007, he moved to Peterborough United for an initial fee of £75,000 plus an extra £25,000 if Peterborough were promoted in that season. In the 2008–09 season Hyde lost the captaincy at Peterborough to Craig Morgan. Manager, Darren Ferguson, said his reason for this was that he was going to use Micah Hyde 'more sparingly' this term. It was announced after their FA Cup match against Tranmere Rovers on 29 November 2008, that Hyde had his contract cancelled by mutual consent after rejecting loan moves to Barnet, Notts County and Stevenage Borough.

In December 2008 Gillingham manager Mark Stimson took Hyde on trial, with a view to signing the player in the January transfer window. He signed a contract with Woking until the end of the 2008–09 season, on 27 February. He made his debut a day later against Burton Albion. He was released after Woking's relegation and signed a one-year deal with Barnet in July 2009. He scored his first goal for Barnet in the FA Cup against Darlington. He then scored his first league goal for Barnet against Aldershot in February 2010. On 2 June 2010, it was announced on the club website that Hyde had been released by Barnet. He signed for Billericay Town in July.

He signed for St Albans City in December 2011 which is where he remained before retiring from competitive football at the end of the 2011–12 season.

Hyde came out of retirement in January 2016, to sign for Ware, making his debut in a 2–1 home defeat to Kings Langley on 30 January 2016.

Hyde has worked as an academy coach at Dagenham & Redbridge. and as of August 2020 works as an academy coach at QPR.

== International career ==
Despite being born in England, Hyde opted to play for Jamaica, for whom he scored once in 17 appearances between 2001 and 2004.

== Personal life ==
He is the father of Dagenham & Redbridge player and Love Island contestant Tyrique Hyde.

== Career statistics ==
=== Club ===
Source: Micah Hyde at the English National Football Archive (subscription required)

Appearances and goals by club, season and competition
Club	Season	League			FA Cup		League Cup		Other		Total	
Club	Season	Division	Apps	Goals	Apps	Goals	Apps	Goals	Apps	Goals	Apps	Goals
Cambridge United	1993–94	Second Division	18	2	2	0	0	0	2 (Note: Appearances in Football League Trophy)	0	22	2
Cambridge United	1994–95	Second Division	27	0	4	0	2	0	1	0	34	0
Cambridge United	1995–96	Third Division	24	4	1	0	0	0	1	0	26	4
Cambridge United	1996–97	Third Division	38	7	2	0	1	0	1	0	42	7
Cambridge United	Total		107	13	9	0	3	0	5	0	124	13
Euran Pallo (loan)	1995	Kakkonen	10	3	—		—		—		10	3
Watford	1997–98	Second Division	40	4	5	0	4	1	0	0	49	5
Watford	1998–99	First Division	44	2	1	0	2	0	3 (Note: Appearances in First Division play-offs)	0	50	2
Watford	1999–2000	Premier League	34	3	1	0	3	1	—		38	4
Watford	2000–01	First Division	26	6	0	0	1	0	—		27	6
Watford	2001–02	First Division	39	4	0	0	4	2	—		43	6
Watford	2002–03	First Division	37	4	4	0	1	0	—		42	4
Watford	2003–04	First Division	33	1	2	0	2	0	—		37	1
Watford	Total		253	24	13	0	17	4	3	0	286	28
Burnley	2004–05	Championship	38	1	4	1	4	0	—		46	2
Burnley	2005–06	Championship	41	0	1	0	2	0	—		44	0
Burnley	2006–07	Championship	23	0	0	0	1	0	—		24	0
Burnley	Total		102	1	5	1	7	0	—		114	2
Peterborough United	2006–07	League Two	18	0	—		—		—		18	0
Peterborough United	2007–08	League Two	37	0	3	0	1	0	2	0	43	0
Peterborough United	2008–09	League One	9	0	0	0	0	0	1	0	10	0
Peterborough United	Total		64	0	3	0	1	0	3	0	71	0
Woking	2008–09	Conference Premier	4	0	—		—		—		4	0
Barnet	2009–10	League Two	41	1	3	1	1	0	1	0	46	2
St Albans City	2011–12	SL Premier Division	16	1	—		—		0	0	16	1
St Albans City	2012–13	SL Premier Division	15	1	2	0	—		1 (Note: Appearances in FA Trophy)	0	18	1
St Albans City	Total		31	2	2	0	—		1	0	34	2
Ware	2015–16	SL Division One Central	1	0	—		—		—		1	0
Career total			613	44	35	2	29	4	13	0	690	50

=== International ===
Appearances and goals by national team and year
National team	Year	Apps	Goals
Jamaica	2001	5	0
Jamaica	2002	2	0
Jamaica	2003	2	0
Jamaica	2004	8	1
Total		17	1

=== International goals ===
England score listed first, score column indicates score after each Hyde goal.

International goals by date, venue, cap, opponent, score, result and competition
No.	Date	Venue	Cap	Opponent	Score	Result	Competition
1	8 September 2004	Estadio Cuscatlán, San Salvador, El Salvador	16	El Salvador	3–0	3–0	2006 FIFA World Cup qualification

== Honours ==
Watford

- Football League First Division play-offs: 1999
- Football League Second Division: 1997–98
