= 2006–07 Burnley F.C. season =

English football club season

Burnley
2006–07 season
- Chairman: Barry Kilby
- Manager: Steve Cotterill
- Championship: 15th
- FA Cup: Third round
- League Cup: First round
- Top goalscorer: League: Andy Gray (14); All: Andy Gray (14)
- Highest home attendance: 15,061 v Leeds United (28 November 2006)
- Lowest home attendance: 3,501 v Hartlepool United (22 August 2006)
- Average home league attendance: 11,956

The 2006–07 season was Burnley's 7th season in the second tier of English football. They were managed by Steve Cotterill in his third full season since he replaced Stan Ternent at the beginning of the 2004–05 season.

== Appearances and goals ==
Numbers in parentheses denote appearances as substitute.
Players with names struck through and marked † left the club during the playing season.
Players with names in italics and marked * were on loan from another club for the whole of their season with Burnley.
Players listed with no appearances have been in the matchday squad but only as unused substitutes.
Key to positions: GK – Goalkeeper; DF – Defender; MF – Midfielder; FW – Forward

Players contracted for the 2006–07 season
No.	Pos.	Nat.	Name	League		FA Cup		League Cup		Total		Discipline	
No.	Pos.	Nat.	Name	Apps	Goals	Apps	Goals	Apps	Goals	Apps	Goals	A yellow rectangle, denoting the yellow penalty card shown to a player being cautioned	A red rectangle, denoting the red penalty card shown to a player being sent off
1	GK	WAL	Danny Coyne	12	0	0	0	0	0	12	0	0	0
2	DF	ENG	Wayne Thomas	33	0	1	0	1	0	35	0	4	2
3	DF	ENG	Jon Harley	44 (1)	1	1	0	1	0	46 (1)	1	11	0
4	DF	ENG	John McGreal	21 (1)	0	1	0	0	0	22 (1)	0	3	0
5	DF	JAM	~~Frank Sinclair~~ †	16 (3)	0	0	0	0 (1)	0	16 (4)	0	5	1
5	DF	IRL	Graham Coughlan *	1 (1)	0	0	0	0	0	1 (1)	0	0	0
6	DF	NIR	Michael Duff	42 (2)	2	0	0	1	0	43 (2)	2	9	0
7	MF	IRL	James O'Connor	39 (4)	3	1	0	1	0	41 (4)	3	10	0
8	MF	IRL	Alan Mahon	10 (15)	2	0 (1)	0	1	0	11 (16)	2	1	0
9	FW	NIR	Steve Jones	37 (4)	5	1	0	1	0	39 (4)	5	1	0
10	FW	SCO	Andy Gray	34 (1)	14	0	0	1	0	35 (1)	14	5	1
11	MF	ENG	Wade Elliott	40 (2)	4	1	0	0 (1)	0	41 (3)	4	8	0
12	GK	DEN	Brian Jensen	30 (1)	0	1	0	1	0	32 (1)	0	0	0
14	MF	IRL	Garreth O'Connor	0 (8)	0	0 (1)	1	0	0	0 (9)	1	0	0
15	MF	ENG	Graham Branch	0 (5)	0	0	0	0	0	0 (5)	0	0	0
16	MF	IRL	Chris McCann	24 (14)	5	1	0	1	0	26 (14)	5	4	0
17	FW	NIR	Kyle Lafferty	15 (20)	4	0 (1)	0	1	0	16 (21)	4	4	0
18	MF	JAM	~~Micah Hyde~~ †	19 (4)	0	0	0	0 (1)	0	19 (5)	0	7	1
18	MF	CMR	Eric Djemba-Djemba *	13 (2)	0	0	0	0	0	13 (2)	0	3	1
19	MF	ENG	John Spicer	0 (11)	1	0	0	0	0	0 (11)	1	0	0
20	FW	NGA	Ade Akinbiyi	15 (5)	2	1	1	0	0	16 (5)	3	0	0
21	FW	ENG	~~Gifton Noel-Williams~~ †	19 (4)	5	1	0	0	0	20 (4)	5	1	0
21	FW	NIR	Paul McVeigh *	6 (2)	3	0	0	0	0	6 (2)	3	0	0
22	DF	ENG	Stephen Foster	7 (10)	0	1	0	1	0	9 (10)	0	2	1
23	GK	ENG	~~Mike Pollitt *~~ †	4	0	0	0	0	0	4	0	0	0
24	DF	SCO	Steven Caldwell	16 (1)	0	0	0	0	0	16 (1)	0	4	0
25	MF	ISL	Joey Guðjónsson	9 (2)	0	0	0	0	0	9 (2)	0	4	0

== Transfers ==
=== In ===
#	Pos	Player	From	Fee	Date
9	FW	(Northern Ireland) Steve Jones	Crewe Alexandra	Free	3 May 2006
10	FW	(Scotland) Andy Gray	Sunderland	£750k	1 June 2006
8	MF	(Republic of Ireland) Alan Mahon	Wigan Athletic	£200k	8 June 2006
22	DF	(England) Stephen Foster	Crewe Alexandra	Free	22 June 2006
20	FW	(Nigeria) Ade Akinbiyi	Sheffield United	£750k	1 January 2007
23	GK	(England) Mike Pollitt	Wigan Athletic	Loan	11 January 2007
18	MF	(Cameroon) Eric Djemba-Djemba	Aston Villa	Loan	12 January 2007
25	MF	(Iceland) Joey Guðjónsson	AZ	£150k	22 January 2007
24	DF	(Scotland) Steven Caldwell	Sunderland	£200k	31 January 2007
5	DF	(Republic of Ireland) Graham Coughlan	Sheffield Wednesday	Loan	22 March 2007
21	FW	(Northern Ireland) Paul McVeigh	Norwich City	Loan	22 March 2007

=== Out ===
#	Pos	Player	To	Fee	Date
	DF	(United States) Danny Karbassiyoon		Retired	8 May 2006
	DF	(Republic of Ireland) Martin Reilly		Released	31 May 2006
	DF	(England) Mark Crossley		Released	31 May 2006
	DF	(England) Duane Courtney	The New Saints	Released	31 May 2006
18	MF	(Jamaica) Micah Hyde	Peterborough United	£75k	11 January 2007
21	FW	(England) Gifton Noel-Williams	Real Murcia	£50k	24 January 2007
5	DF	(Jamaica) Frank Sinclair	Huddersfield Town	Loan	9 February 2007

== Matches ==
=== Championship ===
5 August 2006 1	Burnley	2–0	Queens Park Rangers	Burnley
15:00	Jones 59' 69'	(Report)		Stadium: Turf Moor; Attendance: 12,190; Referee: Mark Clattenburg

8 August 2006 2	Leicester City	0–1	Burnley	Leicester
19:45		(Report)	Gray 45'	Stadium: Walkers Stadium; Attendance: 19,035; Referee: Howard Webb

12 August 2006 3	Sheffield Wednesday	1–1	Burnley	Sheffield
15:00	MacLean 67' (pen.)	(Report)	J. O'Connor 82'	Stadium: Hillsborough Stadium; Attendance: 22,425; Referee: Colin Webster

19 August 2006 4	Burnley	0–1	Wolverhampton Wanderers	Burnley
15:00		(Report)	Johnson 19'	Stadium: Turf Moor; Attendance: 12,245; Referee: Clive Oliver

26 August 2006 5	Crystal Palace	2–2	Burnley	London
15:00	Cort 48'; Scowcroft 74'	D	Mahon 23'; Lafferty 52'	Stadium: Selhurst Park; Attendance: 16,396; Referee: Lee Probert

9 September 2006 6	Burnley	1–2	Colchester United	Burnley
15:00	Gray 88'	(Report)	Watson 26'; Iwelumo 54' (pen.)	Stadium: Turf Moor; Attendance: 10,039; Referee: Ray Olivier

12 September 2006 7	Burnley	4–2	Barnsley	Burnley
19:45	Harley 42'; Noel-Williams 57' 83' 90'	(Report)	McIndoe 21' 32'	Stadium: Turf Moor; Attendance: 10,304; Referee: Gary Sutton

16 September 2006 8	Stoke City	0–1	Burnley	Stoke-on-Trent
15:00		(Report)	Gray 1'	Stadium: Britannia Stadium; Attendance: 12,247; Referee: Chris Foy

23 September 2006 9	Burnley	2–3	Southampton	Burnley
15:00	Jones 4'; Gray 33'	(Report)	Rasiak 18' 73'; Skácel 54'	Stadium: Turf Moor; Attendance: 13,051; Referee: Darren Drysdale

1 October 2006 10	Norwich City	1–4	Burnley	Norwich
13:15	Earnshaw 82'	(Report)	J. O'Connor 32'; Gray 45' 64'; Mahon 89'	Stadium: Carrow Road; Attendance: 24,717; Referee: P Crossley

14 October 2006 11	Burnley	2–0	Hull City	Burnley
15:00	Duff 10'; Noel-Williams 13'	(Report)		Stadium: Turf Moor; Attendance: 11,530; Referee: Andy Penn

17 October 2006 12	Burnley	0–0	Southend United	Burnley
19:45		(Report)		Stadium: Turf Moor; Attendance: 10,461; Referee: Uriah Rennie

21 October 2006 13	Plymouth Argyle	0–0	Burnley	Plymouth
15:00		(Report)		Stadium: Home Park; Attendance: 12,817; Referee: Pat Miller

27 October 2006 14	Burnley	3–2	Preston North End	Burnley
19:45	J. O'Connor 44'; St Ledger 82' (o.g.); Gray 89'	(Report)	Whaley 77'; Ormerod 80'	Stadium: Turf Moor; Attendance: 14,871; Referee: Steve Tanner

31 October 2006 15	Luton Town	0–2	Burnley	Luton
19:45		(Report)	Gray 31' 36'	Stadium: Kenilworth Road; Attendance: 7,664; Referee: Jarnail Singh

4 November 2006 16	Burnley	1–0	Ipswich Town	Burnley
15:00	McCann 90'	(Report)		Stadium: Turf Moor; Attendance: 11,709; Referee: Phil Joslin

11 November 2006 17	Cardiff City	1–0	Burnley	Cardiff
15:00	Scimeca 23'	(Report)		Stadium: Ninian Park; Attendance: 15,774; Referee: Peter Walton

18 November 2006 18	West Bromwich Albion	3–0	Burnley	West Bromwich
15:00	Koumas 5'; Ellington 7'; Carter 45'	(Report)		Stadium: The Hawthorns; Attendance: 18,707; Referee: Richard Beeby

25 November 2006 19	Burnley	1–2	Birmingham City	Burnley
19:45	McCann 4'	(Report)	Bendtner 15'; Campbell 83'	Stadium: Turf Moor; Attendance: 12,889; Referee: Kevin Wright

28 November 2006 20	Burnley	2–1	Leeds United	Burnley
19:45	Noel-Williams 67'; Gray 69'	(Report)	Healy 87'	Stadium: Turf Moor; Attendance: 15,061; Referee: Phil Dowd

2 December 2006 21	Ipswich Town	1–1	Burnley	Ipswich
15:00	Lee 90' (pen.)	(Report)	Lafferty 86'	Stadium: Portman Road; Attendance: 20,254; Referee: Keith Hill

9 December 2006 22	Coventry City	1–0	Burnley	Coventry
15:00	Cameron 31' (pen.)	(Report)		Stadium: Ricoh Arena; Attendance: 18,362; Referee: M Thorpe

16 December 2006 23	Burnley	2–2	Sunderland	Burnley
15:00	Lafferty 9' 52'	(Report)	Leadbitter 80'; Connolly 90'	Stadium: Turf Moor; Attendance: 14,798; Referee: Mike Dean

23 December 2006 24	Burnley	0–0	Derby County	Burnley
15:00		(Report)		Stadium: Turf Moor; Attendance: 12,825; Referee: Mike Pike

26 December 2006 25	Barnsley	1–0	Burnley	Barnsley
15:00	Devaney 30'	(Report)		Stadium: Oakwell; Attendance: 12,842; Referee: Iain Williamson

30 December 2006 26	Hull City	2–0	Burnley	Kingston upon Hull
15:00	Marney 6'; Fagan 23' (pen.)	(Report)		Stadium: KC Stadium; Attendance: 17,731; Referee: G Laws

13 January 2007 27	Southampton	0–0	Burnley	Southampton
15:00		(Report)		Stadium: St Mary's Stadium; Attendance: 20,486; Referee: Anthony Bates

23 January 2007 28	Burnley	0–1	Stoke City	Burnley
19:45		(Report)	Sidibe 24'	Stadium: Turf Moor; Attendance: 12,109; Referee: Mike Pike

30 January 2007 29	Derby County	1–0	Burnley	Derby
19:45	Howard 4'	(Report)		Stadium: Pride Park Stadium; Attendance: 23,122; Referee: Mike Riley

3 February 2007 30	Queens Park Rangers	3–1	Burnley	London
15:00	Cook 13'; Blackstock 55'; Lomas 72'	(Report)	McCann 18'	Stadium: Loftus Road; Attendance: 10,811; Referee: Dermot Gallagher

10 February 2007 31	Burnley	1–1	Sheffield Wednesday	Burnley
15:00	Elliott 55'	(Report)	Burton 58'	Stadium: Turf Moor; Attendance: 12,745; Referee: N Miller

17 February 2007 32	Wolverhampton Wanderers	2–1	Burnley	Wolverhampton
15:00	Kightly 5'; S. Ward 40'	(Report)	McCann 53'	Stadium: Molineux Stadium; Attendance: 19,521; Referee: Kevin Friend

20 February 2007 33	Burnley	0–1	Leicester City	Burnley
19:45		(Report)	McGreal 67' (o.g.)	Stadium: Turf Moor; Attendance: 10,274; Referee: Mike Dean

24 February 2007 34	Colchester United	0–0	Burnley	Colchester
15:00		(Report)		Stadium: Layer Road; Attendance: 4,934; Referee: Carl Boyeson

3 March 2007 35	Burnley	1–1	Crystal Palace	Burnley
15:00	Akinbiyi 53'	(Report)	Morrison 15'	Stadium: Turf Moor; Attendance: 10,659; Referee: Eddie Ilderton

13 March 2007 36	Southend United	1–0	Burnley	Southend-on-Sea
19:45	Foran 90'	(Report)		Stadium: Roots Hall; Attendance: 8,855; Referee: Paul Taylor

17 March 2007 37	Preston North End	2–0	Burnley	Preston
13:00	Nugent 33'; Agyemang 75'	(Report)		Stadium: Deepdale; Attendance: 17,666; Referee: Colin Webster

31 March 2007 38	Burnley	0–0	Luton Town	Burnley
15:00		(Report)		Stadium: Turf Moor; Attendance: 11,088; Referee: Mike Thorpe

3 April 2007 39	Burnley	4–0	Plymouth Argyle	Burnley
19:45	Duff 13'; McVeigh 20'; Jones 38'; Elliott 61'	(Report)		Stadium: Turf Moor; Attendance: 9,793; Referee: Andy Hall

7 April 2007 40	Birmingham City	0–1	Burnley	Birmingham
15:00		(Report)	Spicer 80'	Stadium: St Andrew's; Attendance: 28,777; Referee: N Miller

9 April 2007 41	Burnley	2–0	Cardiff City	Burnley
15:00	Jones 4'; McVeigh 48'	(Report)		Stadium: Turf Moor; Attendance: 11,347; Referee: Richard Beeby

14 April 2007 42	Leeds United	1–0	Burnley	Leeds
15:00	Heath 21'	(Report)		Stadium: Elland Road; Attendance: 23,528; Referee: Steve Tanner

17 April 2007 43	Burnley	3–0	Norwich City	Burnley
19:45	Akinbiyi 30'; Gray 86'; Elliott 89'	(Report)		Stadium: Turf Moor; Attendance: 9,681; Referee: Martin Atkinson

23 April 2007 44	Burnley	3–2	West Bromwich Albion	Burnley
19:45	Gray 15' 48'; McCann 87'	(Report)	Koumas 6'; Ellington 8'	Stadium: Turf Moor; Attendance: 12,500; Referee: Mike Jones

27 April 2007 45	Sunderland	3–2	Burnley	Sunderland
19:45	Murphy 14'; Connolly 54' (pen.); Edwards 80'	(Report)	Gray 39' (pen.); Elliott 50'	Stadium: Stadium of Light; Attendance: 44,448; Referee: Trevor Kettle

6 May 2007 46	Burnley	1–2	Coventry City	Burnley
13:00	McVeigh 62'	(Report)	Mifsud 30'; Tabb 55'	Stadium: Turf Moor; Attendance: 12,830; Referee: Phil Joslin

=== Final league position ===
Pos	Team	Pld	W	D	L	GF	GA	GD	Pts
13	Cardiff City	46	17	13	16	57	53	+4	64
14	Ipswich Town	46	18	8	20	64	59	+5	62
15	Burnley	46	15	12	19	52	49	+3	57
16	Norwich City	46	16	9	21	56	71	−15	57
17	Coventry City	46	16	8	22	47	62	−15	56

Source: RSSSF
Rules for classification: In the Football League goals scored (F) takes precedence over goal difference (GD).

=== League Cup ===
==== 1st Round ====
22 August 2006	Burnley	0–1	Hartlepool United	Burnley
19:45		(Report)	Porter 78' (pen.)	Stadium: Turf Moor; Attendance: 3,853; Referee: Carl Boyeson

=== FA Cup ===
==== 3rd Round ====
9 January 2007	Reading	3–2	Burnley	Madejski Stadium, Reading
20:00	Lita 27'; Long 37'; Sodje 55'	(Report)	Akinbiyi 69'; G. O'Connor 90'	Attendance: 11,514; Referee: Rob Styles
