= Amadou Sanokho =

French footballer (born 1979)

Personal information
- Date of birth: 1 September 1979 (age 47)
- Place of birth: Paris, France
- Height: 1.89 m (6 ft 2 in)
- Position: Midfielder

Senior career*
Years	Team	Apps	(Gls)
1998–2001	Nantes B	8	(1)
2001–2002	Modena		
2002–2003	Rondinella		
2003–2004	Sangiustese		
2004–2005	Burnley	3	(0)
2005	Oldham Athletic	1	(0)
2005–2006	Proodeftiki	0	(0)
2006–2008	Atromitos	26	(0)
2008–2009	APEP Pitsilia	15	(0)
2010–2011	UJA Alfortville	3	(0)
2010–2011	Ethnikos Asteras	13	(0)
2011–2012	Iraklis Psachna	18	(1)
- * Club domestic league appearances and goals

Amadou Sanokho (born 1 September 1979) is a French former professional footballer, who played as a midfielder or central defender.

== Career ==
Sanokho was trained in the FC Nantes Atlantique, one of the best French training centers.

He moved to the Italian club FC Modena in 2001.

Afterwards, he successively passed in West Ham United of premiership, Sangiustese of Italian Serie D, Burnley of Championship and Oldham Athletic of League One.

Sanokho then settled in Greece, signing with Proodeftiki, before spending two seasons in the Atromitos in the first Greek division. At Atromitos, he competed in the UEFA Cup playing against Sevilla.

In 2008, he transferred to APEP F.C. of the Cypriot First Division where stayed one year.

He returned to France, joining UJA Alfortville of the Championnat National before returning to Greece in the Vyzas F.C. and later Iraklis Psachna.
