= Chris Day =

English footballer (born 1975)

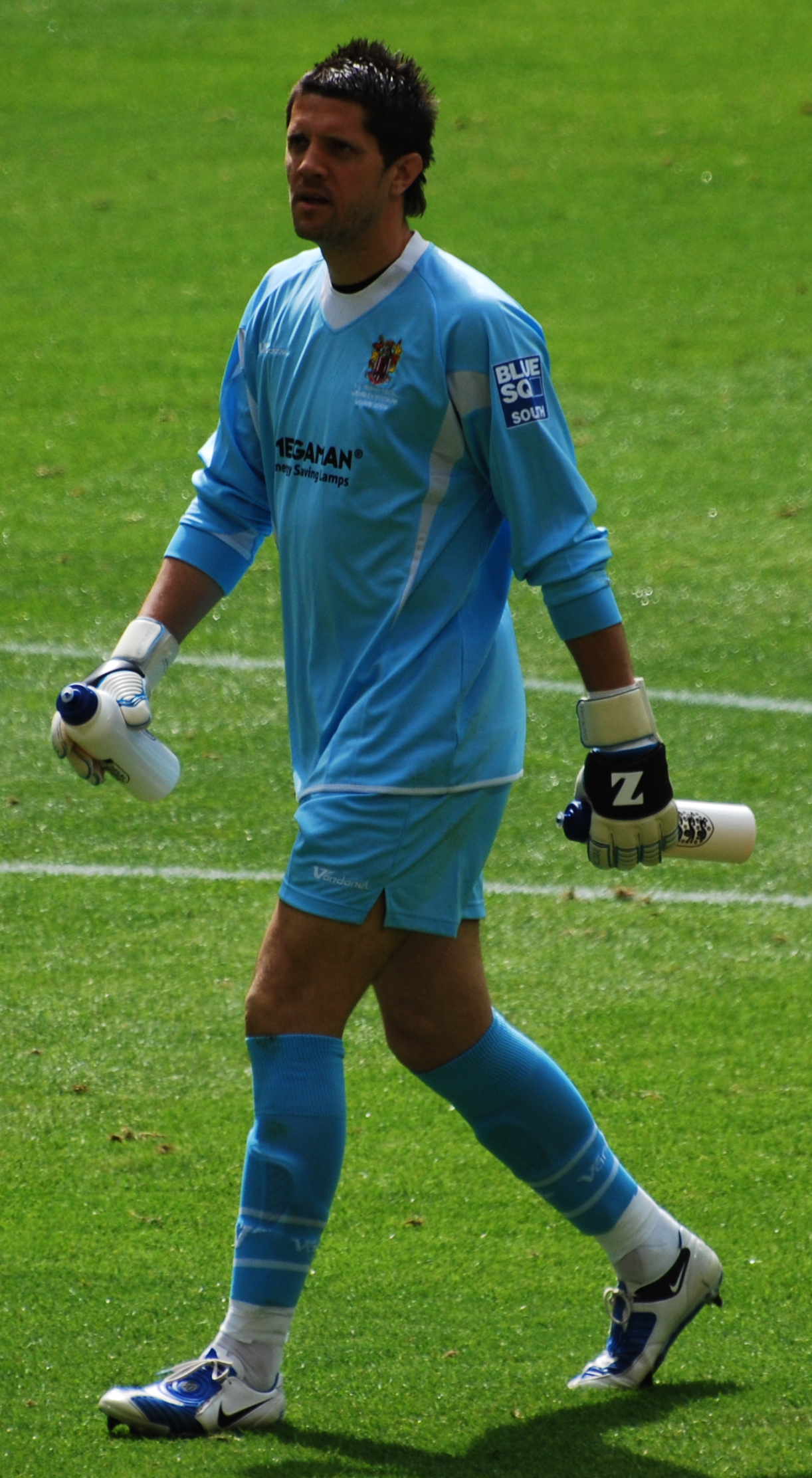
- Day playing for Stevenage Borough in the 2009 FA Trophy final

Personal information
- Full name: Christopher Nicholas Day
- Date of birth: 28 July 1975 (age 51)
- Place of birth: Walthamstow, London, England
- Height: 6 ft 3 in (1.91 m)
- Position: Goalkeeper

Youth career
- 1991–1995: Tottenham Hotspur

Senior career*
Years	Team	Apps	(Gls)
1995–1996	Tottenham Hotspur	0	(0)
1996–1997	Crystal Palace	24	(0)
1997–2001	Watford	11	(0)
2000–2001	→ Lincoln City (loan)	14	(0)
2001–2005	Queens Park Rangers	87	(0)
2002	→ Aylesbury United (loan)	7	(0)
2005	→ Preston North End (loan)	6	(0)
2005–2006	Oldham Athletic	30	(0)
2006–2008	Millwall	10	(0)
2008–2018	Stevenage	300	(0)
Total		489	(0)

International career
1992–1993	England U18	8	(0)
1996–1997	England U21	6	(0)
- * Club domestic league appearances and goals

Christopher Nicholas Day (born 28 July 1975) is an English former professional footballer who played as a goalkeeper.

Day began his career at Tottenham Hotspur, spending five years with the club, during which he made four UEFA Intertoto Cup appearances. He joined Crystal Palace for a fee of £225,000 in July 1996 and played regularly during the first half of the 1996–97 season. The following season, he signed for Watford, where he spent four seasons and made 11 Premier League appearances during the 1999–2000 season. In his final season at the club, he had a three-month loan spell at Lincoln City. After leaving Watford in 2001, Day joined Queens Park Rangers, making 100 appearances over three and a half years and also having brief loans at Aylesbury United and Preston North End.

He moved to Oldham Athletic ahead of the 2005–06 season and then joined Millwall a year later. In August 2008, Day signed for Stevenage Borough, where he made 361 appearances over a decade. His spell included winning the FA Trophy in 2009 in his first season, followed by back-to-back promotions from the Conference Premier to League One. In May 2016, he combined his playing duties with the role of goalkeeping coach. He left Stevenage in July 2018, marking his retirement from professional football. Internationally, Day represented England at under-18 level eight times, winning the 1993 UEFA European Under-18 Championship, and also earned six caps for the England under-21 team between 1996 and 1997.

== Early life ==
Born in Walthamstow, London, Day began playing as a striker for schoolboy team Ridgeway Rovers, playing alongside David Beckham and scoring 63 goals in one season. Due to his height, Day was later made the team's goalkeeper.

== Club career ==
=== Early career ===
Day joined Tottenham Hotspur as a trainee and progressed through the club's youth system. Although he made no Premier League appearances during his four years there, he played in all four of Tottenham's 1995 UEFA Intertoto Cup group matches, with the club fielding a team composed of loanees, youth, and reserve players. Tottenham recorded one win in the competition, a 2–1 away victory over Rudar Velenje. Day transferred to Crystal Palace in July 1996 for £225,000, making his Football League debut in a 1–0 defeat against Birmingham City at St Andrew's. He made 28 appearances during the first half of the 1996–97 season, but did not feature thereafter, having lost his place to Carlo Nash in January 1997.

=== Watford ===
Ahead of the 1997–98 season, Day joined Watford as part of a swap deal that saw Kevin Miller move to Crystal Palace. He made his debut in a 4–0 League Cup defeat away to Sheffield United, scoring an own goal in the first half, and made one further appearance that season in a 1–0 Football League Trophy defeat at Fulham on 9 December 1997. Day did not feature as Watford secured promotion to the Premier League via the play-offs, but received a winners' medal as an unused substitute in the final.

During the 1999–2000 season, Day made 11 Premier League appearances for Watford, starting in their opening match of the season against Wimbledon and keeping a clean sheet in a 1–0 victory over Liverpool at Anfield on 14 August 1999. His final appearance for the club came in a 1–0 victory over Coventry City on 14 May 2000, after which the arrival of Espen Baardsen that summer saw him drop to third-choice goalkeeper. Midway through the 2000–01 season, Day joined Lincoln City on a three-month loan, making 18 appearances in all competitions for the club.

=== Queens Park Rangers ===
In July 2001, Day joined Queens Park Rangers on a free transfer following his release from Watford. He made his QPR debut in a 1–0 victory over Stoke City on 11 August 2001, and went on to make 18 appearances during the 2001–02 season. He was dropped in October 2001 after the arrival of Fraser Digby and shortly afterwards suffered a broken leg in a home match against Oldham Athletic following a challenge with striker Matthew Tipton. As part of his recovery, he was loaned to non-League club Aylesbury United in October 2002, and made 11 appearances during his two months there. Day returned to QPR's first team late in the 2002–03 season and remained first-choice goalkeeper for the remainder of that campaign, including the play-off final at the Millennium Stadium, where QPR were defeated 1–0 by Cardiff City.

Day made 34 appearances for QPR during the 2003–04 season, keeping 16 clean sheets between August 2003 to February 2004, including five in six matches during November 2003. An injury in February 2004 led to QPR signing Lee Camp on loan to cover in his absence, whose performances kept Day out of the team upon his return. He was an unused substitute in QPR's 3–1 win against Sheffield Wednesday, which secured the club's automatic promotion to the Championship. He returned to the first team in the 2004–05 season, making 33 appearances before being dropped in January 2005 for loanee Simon Royce. Subsequently, Day joined Preston North End on a one-month loan, keeping two clean sheets in six appearances during his time there. He was released by QPR upon the expiry of his contract in June 2005.

=== Oldham and Millwall ===
A week before the start of the 2005–06 season, Day joined Oldham Athletic on a two-year contract. He established himself as the first-choice goalkeeper, making 36 appearances and keeping nine clean sheets during the season. After manager Ronnie Moore signed Derby County goalkeeper Lee Grant on loan in late January 2006, Day became second-choice for the remainder of the season. He departed Oldham and signed a two-year contract with League One club Millwall in June 2006, making seven appearances during the 2006–07 season. He was predominantly second-choice goalkeeper during the 2007–08 season, making a further seven appearances before leaving when his contract expired in June 2008.

=== Stevenage ===
"I've got a close affinity with Stevenage. It's my hometown club, so to get promoted with them is fantastic. To finish as champions over a long, difficult season is brilliant."

— Chris Day, on Stevenage securing promotion to the Football League in April 2010.

Following surgery on a leg injury, Day contemplated retirement. Living in Stevenage, he trained with local Conference Premier club Stevenage Borough for several weeks before signing a two-year contract in August 2008. At the time of his arrival, the club were second-bottom of the league, having conceded 13 goals in four matches. He made his debut in a 1–1 draw at home to Crawley Town on 25 August 2008. Between December 2008 and April 2009, Stevenage went 24 matches unbeaten, setting a club record. The club reached the play-offs, losing in the semi-finals against Cambridge United, and won the FA Trophy, with Day keeping four clean sheets in six matches, including the 2–0 victory over York City in the final at Wembley Stadium on 9 May 2009. He made 52 appearances across all competitions in his first season, recording 20 clean sheets.

Day was in goal for Stevenage's 2–0 victory at Kidderminster Harriers on 17 April 2010, which secured promotion to the Football League for the first time in the club's history. He made 39 league appearances that season, kept 24 clean sheets, the highest in the league, and helped the club achieve the division's best defensive record, conceding 24 goals. In all competitions, he made 50 appearances during the season. Day started in Stevenage's inaugural Football League fixture, a 2–2 draw against Macclesfield Town on 7 August 2010. Stevenage finished sixth, winning the play-off semi-final against Accrington Stanley 3–0 on aggregate, with Day keeping two clean sheets. He kept a clean sheet in the 1–0 League Two play-off final victory against Torquay United on 28 May 2011, earning promotion to League One. The club conceded the fewest goals in League Two, with Day recording 19 clean sheets, and he played every minute of all 56 of Stevenage's matches that season.

Ahead of the 2011–12 season, Day dislocated a finger in a pre-season friendly against Fulham, ruling him out for one month and causing him to miss Stevenage's first three matches of the season. He signed a contract extension on 19 August 2011 and retained his position as first-choice goalkeeper for the remainder of the season, missing only one further league game. During an FA Cup run to the fifth round, Day kept a clean sheet in a goalless home draw with former club Tottenham Hotspur before a 3–1 defeat in the replay at White Hart Lane. He made 52 appearances in all competitions that season as Stevenage lost in the League One play-off semi-final to Sheffield United, with only champions Charlton Athletic conceding fewer league goals.

Day began the 2012–13 season as first-choice, with Stevenage unbeaten in their opening nine league matches. However, following Stevenage's 2–2 draw with Bury on 29 September 2012, manager Gary Smith replaced him with Steve Arnold. He was largely second-choice for the remainder of the campaign, returning briefly during Arnold's suspension, and played in the final two league matches following Graham Westley's return as manager. Day made 19 appearances across all competitions during the season. In May 2013, Day signed a new one-year contract extension, and made 52 appearances under Westley during the 2013–14 season as Stevenage were relegated to League Two. He extended his contract for another year on 17 May 2014.

Day remained first-choice during the 2014–15 season, making 43 appearances in all competitions as Stevenage were defeated in the League Two play-off semi-final by Southend United. He began the 2015–16 season as first-choice under new manager Teddy Sheringham, making 23 appearances, before being replaced by Jamie Jones. Day signed a player-goalkeeper coach contract on 25 May 2016, taking on a dual role for the first time, and made 12 appearances during the 2016–17 season. He featured twice the following season before leaving the club in July 2018. Offered a position solely as goalkeeping coach, he declined, wishing to retain a playing contract alongside coaching duties, and retired from playing. Day made 361 appearances during his ten years at Stevenage, placing him fifth on the club's all-time appearance list.

== International career ==
Day made his debut for the England under-18 team in a 7–2 victory over Switzerland on 17 November 1992. He earned eight caps at that level, including appearing in all four matches as England won the 1993 UEFA European Under-18 Championship. Between 1996 and 1997, he made six appearances for the under-21 team.

== Coaching career ==
Having served as Stevenage's goalkeeping coach for two seasons, Day was appointed to the same role at Northampton Town on 2 August 2018. He joined under manager Dean Austin, whom he had known from their time together at Tottenham Hotspur. Following Austin's dismissal a month later, new manager Keith Curle appointed his own goalkeeping coach, and Day left the club on 8 October 2018. He also spent time coaching at Tottenham's academy.

== Personal life ==
Day married in Stevenage in June 2004. A supporter of Tottenham Hotspur, he attends matches when commitments permit. He previously owned a pub in Stevenage, located just over a mile from Broadhall Way.

== Career statistics ==
Appearances and goals by club, season and competition
Club	Season	League			FA Cup		League Cup		Other		Total	
Club	Season	Division	Apps	Goals	Apps	Goals	Apps	Goals	Apps	Goals	Apps	Goals
Tottenham Hotspur	1992–93	Premier League	0	0	0	0	0	0	0	0	0	0
Tottenham Hotspur	1993–94	Premier League	0	0	0	0	0	0	0	0	0	0
Tottenham Hotspur	1994–95	Premier League	0	0	0	0	0	0	0	0	0	0
Tottenham Hotspur	1995–96	Premier League	0	0	0	0	0	0	4 (Note: Appearances in Intertoto Cup)	0	4	0
Tottenham Hotspur	Total		0	0	0	0	0	0	4	0	5	0
Crystal Palace	1996–97	First Division	24	0	2	0	2	0	0	0	28	0
Watford	1997–98	Second Division	0	0	0	0	1	0	1 (Note: Appearance(s) in Football League Trophy)	0	2	0
Watford	1998–99	First Division	0	0	0	0	0	0	0	0	0	0
Watford	1999–2000	Premier League	11	0	0	0	0	0	0	0	11	0
Watford	2000–01	First Division	0	0	0	0	0	0	0	0	0	0
Watford	Total		11	0	0	0	1	0	1	0	13	0
Lincoln City (loan)	2000–01	Third Division	14	0	0	0	0	0	4	0	18	0
Queens Park Rangers	2001–02	Second Division	16	0	0	0	1	0	1	0	18	0
Queens Park Rangers	2002–03	Second Division	12	0	0	0	0	0	3 (Note: Appearances in 2003 Second Division play-offs)	0	15	0
Queens Park Rangers	2003–04	Second Division	29	0	1	0	3	0	1	0	34	0
Queens Park Rangers	2004–05	Championship	30	0	1	0	2	0	0	0	33	0
Queens Park Rangers	Total		87	0	2	0	6	0	5	0	100	0
Aylesbury United (loan)	2002–03	Isthmian Premier Division	7	0	0	0	—		4 (Note: Two appearances in FA Trophy; one appearance in Berks & Bucks Senior Cup; one appearance in Alan Turvey Trophy)	0	11	0
Preston North End (loan)	2004–05	Championship	6	0	0	0	0	0	0	0	6	0
Oldham Athletic	2005–06	League One	30	0	4	0	1	0	1	0	36	0
Millwall	2006–07	League One	5	0	0	0	1	0	1	0	7	0
Millwall	2007–08	League One	5	0	0	0	1	0	1	0	7	0
Millwall	Total		10	0	0	0	2	0	2	0	14	0
Stevenage	2008–09	Conference Premier	41	0	3	0	—		8 (Note: Six appearances in FA Trophy; two appearances in 2009 Conference Premier play-offs)	0	52	0
Stevenage	2009–10	Conference Premier	40	0	3	0	—		7 (Note: Appearances in FA Trophy)	0	50	0
Stevenage	2010–11	League Two	46	0	5	0	1	0	4 (Note: One appearance in Football League Trophy; three appearances in 2011 League Two play-offs)	0	56	0
Stevenage	2011–12	League One	44	0	6	0	0	0	2 (Note: Appearances in 2012 League One play-offs)	0	52	0
Stevenage	2012–13	League One	17	0	0	0	2	0	0	0	19	0
Stevenage	2013–14	League One	44	0	4	0	1	0	3	0	52	0
Stevenage	2014–15	League Two	38	0	2	0	0	0	3 (Note: One appearance in Football League Trophy; two appearances in 2015 League Two play-offs)	0	43	0
Stevenage	2015–16	League Two	19	0	2	0	1	0	1	0	23	0
Stevenage	2016–17	League Two	11	0	0	0	0	0	1	0	12	0
Stevenage	2017–18	League Two	0	0	0	0	0	0	2	0	2	0
Stevenage	Total		300	0	25	0	5	0	31	0	361	0
Career total			489	0	33	0	17	0	52	0	591	0

== Honours ==
Watford

- Football League First Division play-offs: 1999

Stevenage

- Football League Two play-offs: 2011
- Conference Premier: 2009–10
- FA Trophy: 2008–09; runner-up: 2009–10

England U18

- UEFA European Under-18 Football Championship: 1993

Individual

- Goalkeeping Golden Glove: November 2011
- Football League One Golden Glove: 2011–12
