= William Fisken =

William Fisken (died 1883) was a Scottish presbyterian minister.

== Education and career ==
Fisken, the son of a farmer, was born on Gelleyburn farm, near Crieff, Perthshire. After attending school at the neighbouring village of Muthill, he was sent to St. Andrews College to study for the ministry under Professor Duncan. Subsequently, he removed to the University of Glasgow, and thence to the Divinity Hall of the United Secession Church. While there he taught a school at Alyth, near his birthplace. Upon receiving license in the presbytery of Dundee, he commenced his career as a preacher in the Secession church.

He visited various places throughout the country, including the Orkney Islands. He was sent to the presbytery at Newcastle upon Tyne, and preached as a probationer at the adjoining village of Stamfordham, where in 1847 he was ordained into the ministry. In the double capacity of governor and secretary he did much towards promoting the success of the scheme of the endowed schools at Stamfordham.

== Inventions ==
William Fisken, along with his brothers, Thomas and David, had a keen interest in mechanics, and in 1855 were granted a patent for an innovative new steam plough. The brothers were subsequently involved in a lawsuit with John Fowler, who was widely credited with the invention. The jury found that the Fiskens were the original discoverers.

Fisken also invented a potato-sowing machine, a safety steam boiler, a propeller, an apparatus for heating churches, which worked excellently, and the 'steam tackle' which, patented in July 1855, helped to render the steam plough of practical use. This system of haulage, which obtained second prize at the royal show at Wolverhampton, has undergone great modifications since its early appearance in Scotland in 1852, its exhibition at Carlisle in 1855, and at the show of the Royal Agricultural Society in 1863.

Fisken also worked on the fly-rope system; an endless rope set into motion by the flywheel of the engine drove windlasses by which the plough or other implement was put in motion. A great deal of excellent work was done on this system, especially with tackle made by Messrs. Barford & Perkins of Peterborough, but for some reason the system never took with farmers, and very few sets of Fisken's tackle are now in use. Fisken was the author of a pamphlet on 'The Cheapest System of Steam Cultivation and Steam Cartage,' and of another 'On the Comparative Methods of Steam Tackle,' which gained the prize of the Royal Bath and West of England Society.

== Death ==
He died at his manse in Stamfordham, on 28 December 1883, aged upwards of seventy.
