= Alec Chamberlain =

English footballer (born 1964)

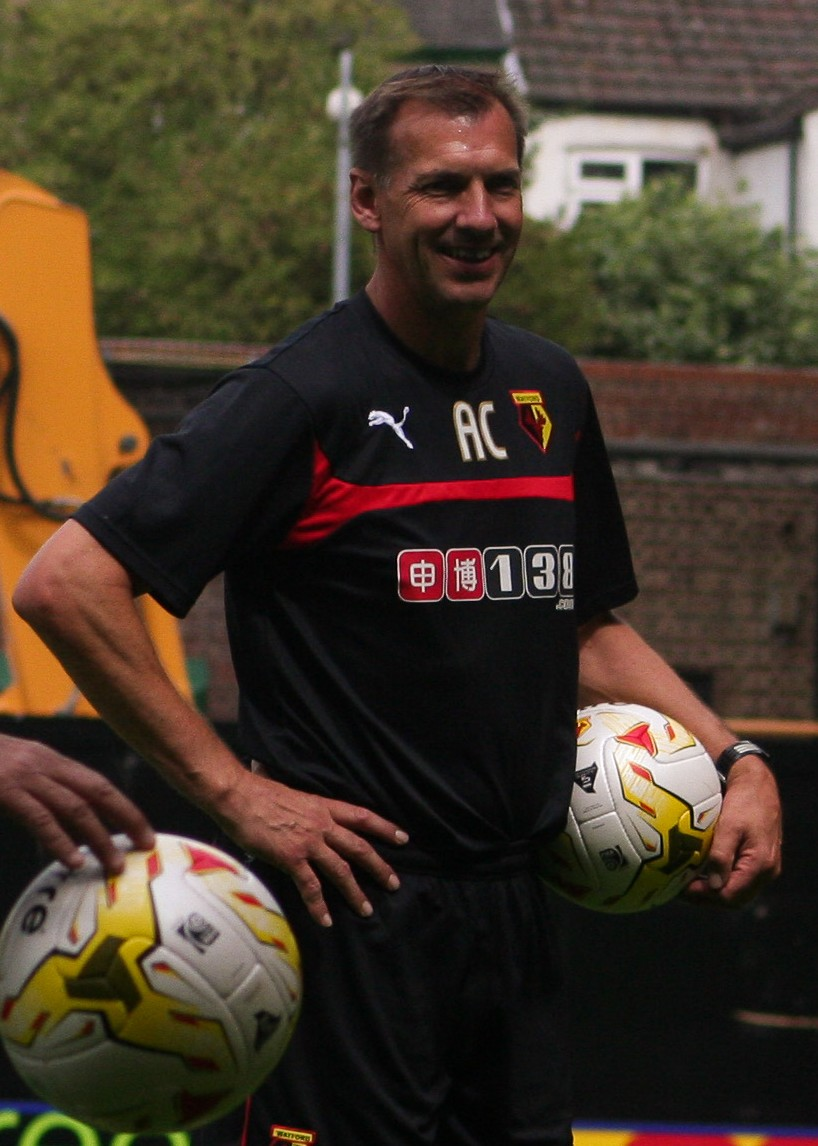
- Chamberlain as a goalkeeping coach for Watford

Personal information
- Full name: Alec Francis Roy Chamberlain
- Date of birth: 20 June 1964 (age 62)
- Place of birth: March, England
- Height: 6 ft 2 in (1.88 m)
- Position: Goalkeeper

Youth career
- 1980–1981: Ramsey Town

Senior career*
Years	Team	Apps	(Gls)
1981–1982	Ipswich Town	0	(0)
1982–1987	Colchester United	188	(0)
1987–1988	Everton	0	(0)
1987–1988	→ Tranmere Rovers (loan)	15	(0)
1988–1993	Luton Town	138	(0)
1992	→ Chelsea (loan)	0	(0)
1993–1996	Sunderland	90	(0)
1995	→ Liverpool (loan)	0	(0)
1996–2007	Watford	247	(0)
Total		678	(0)
- * Club domestic league appearances and goals

Alec Francis Roy Chamberlain (born 20 June 1964) is an English former professional footballer who played as a goalkeeper. He made 788 league appearances during his 25-year playing career, the final 11 years and 247 appearances of which were with Watford.

== Career ==
Chamberlain started his career at Ipswich Town as a trainee but did not make an appearance for the club and moved to Colchester United in 1982. He spent five years at Layer Road before joining Everton for £80,000. However, he was unable to displace established Everton goalkeeper Neville Southall, and his only appearances in the 1987–88 season were during a loan spell at Tranmere Rovers.

Having failed to make a single first team appearance for Everton in a year there, Chamberlain signed for Luton Town in the summer of 1988 whilst living in Northampton, where he ousted Les Sealey after Sealey had a poor game in the League Cup final against Nottingham Forest. Chamberlain became first choice goalkeeper for the next four seasons. He did have a loan spell as understudy to Dave Beasant at Chelsea in the 1992–93, but did not make an appearance.

After signing for Sunderland in 1993, Chamberlain played regularly, making 90 league appearances over three years. He was part of the team that was promoted in 1995–96. Towards the end of the 1994–95 season, he was loaned to Liverpool as understudy to David James after previous deputy Michael Stensgaard dislocated a shoulder in an ironing incident. Despite never playing a game for the Anfield side he collected a League Cup winner's medal as an unused substitute in the final.

In the summer of 1996 he was allowed to join recently relegated Watford, who paid £40,000 for him. He started off unable to get in the team, but finally played when first-choice goalkeeper and two-time Player of the Season Kevin Miller was sold to Crystal Palace in the 1997 close season. Now the first-choice goalkeeper, he was part of the Division Two Championship winning side in 1997–98, becoming Player of the Season in the process. He continued to play an important role as Watford gained promotion to the Premier League in 1999. In the playoff semi-final second leg against Birmingham City, his save denied Birmingham a winning goal, and won the match for Watford with a penalty shootout save from Chris Holland in sudden-death. He appeared at Wembley when Watford beat Bolton Wanderers 2–0 in the final.

Chamberlain missed the first six games of Watford's Premiership campaign due to injury and had to wait six games before he could play again. Watford were relegated to Division One at the end of the season. The club signed Tottenham Hotspur goalkeeper Espen Baardsen, and the two players competed for the starting position through the 2000–01 season. When Gianluca Vialli arrived as Watford manager at the end of the season, he selected Baardsen as his first choice, but Chamberlain returned to the side in October 2001 and kept his place, finishing as Player of the Season for the second time in five years.

Under Ray Lewington, he was first-choice for the whole of the 2002–03 season. In 2003–04 he started as first-choice, but lost his place to Lenny Pidgeley for several months, before regaining his place towards the end of the campaign. Chamberlain, now 40, took the job of goalkeeping coach in the autumn of 2004.

Chamberlain was given a testimonial by Watford. With Chamberlain in goal Watford lost to Premiership side Charlton Athletic 2–1. Various events were run throughout the season to celebrate Chamberlain's ten years at the club.

On 20 July 2006, after Watford's promotion to the Premier League via the Championship playoffs, he signed a new one-year contract keeping him as player at Vicarage Road until summer 2007 making him, at 42, the oldest Premier League player in 2006–07. On 13 May 2007, Chamberlain came on as a substitute to become one of the oldest Premier League players ever. On 19 May 2007, it was announced that Chamberlain would be retiring from playing and would concentrate on his coaching role at the club.

== Honours ==
Everton

- FA Charity Shield: 1987

Liverpool

- Football League Cup: 1994–95

Sunderland

- Football League First Division: 1995–96

Watford

- Football League First Division / Championship play-offs: 1999, 2006
- Football League Second Division: 1997–98

Individual

- Colchester United Player of the Year: 1985
- Watford Player of the Season: 1997–98, 2001–02
- PFA Team of the Year: 1997–98 Second Division
