= Lars Melvang =

Danish footballer (born 1969)

Personal information
- Full name: Lars Mandrup Melvang
- Date of birth: April 3, 1969 (age 57)
- Place of birth: Seattle, United States
- Height: 1.78 m (5 ft 10 in)
- Position: Right back

Senior career*
Years	Team	Apps	(Gls)
1987–1991	OB		
1991–1997	Silkeborg	136	(4)
1997–1998	Watford	4	(1)
- * Club domestic league appearances and goals

Lars Melvang (born April 3, 1969) is a Danish former football (soccer) defender. He played mostly for Odense BK and Silkeborg, but also had a spell with Watford in 1997 where he scored on his debut against Brentford. He has two younger brothers, Jens and Jakob Melvang.

== Honours ==
Silkeborg

- Danish Superliga: 1993–94
- UEFA Intertoto Cup: 1996
