= Herwig Walker =

Austrian former footballer

Personal information
- Date of birth: 4 May 1972 (age 54)
- Place of birth: Austria
- Position: Goalkeeper

Senior career*
Years	Team	Apps	(Gls)
–1992	SV Spittal		
1992–1996	LASK	22+	(0+)
1996–1999	Vorwärts Steyr	29+	(0+)
1999–2000	Watford	0	(0)
2000–2001	SV Spittal		
2001–2004	LASK	2+	(0+)
- * Club domestic league appearances and goals

Herwig Walker (born 4 May 1972) is an Austrian former footballer who is last known to have played as a goalkeeper for LASK.

== Career ==
Walker started his career with Austrian second division side SV Spittal. In 1992, Walker signed for LASK in the Austrian top flight, where he made over 22 league appearances and scored 0 goals. In 1996, he signed for Austrian second division club Vorwärts Steyr, helping them earn promotion to the Austrian top flight. In 1999, Walker signed for Watford in the English Premier League. In 2000, he returned to Austrian third division team SV Spittal. In 2001, he returned to LASK in the Austrian second division.
