= Adrian Bakalli =

Belgian footballer

Personal information
- Date of birth: 22 November 1976 (age 49)
- Place of birth: Brussels, Belgium
- Height: 1.91 m (6 ft 3 in)
- Position: Midfielder

Senior career*
Years	Team	Apps	(Gls)
1995–1999	RWD Molenbeek	25	(1)
1999–2001	Watford	2	(0)
2001	Swindon Town	1	(0)
2003–2005	Kortrijk		
2005–2010	Berchem		
Total		28+	(1+)

International career
1996	Belgium U21	5	(0)
- * Club domestic league appearances and goals

Adrian Bakalli (born 22 November 1976) is a Belgian former professional footballer who played as a midfielder.

== Career ==
Born in Brussels, Bakalli began his career with RWD Molenbeek, making 25 appearances in the Belgian Second Division. He then moved to England, signing for Watford in January 1999, making two appearances in the Premier League. He also made one appearance in the Football League for Swindon Town. He returned to Belgium, playing with Kortrijk and Berchem.

Bakalli represented the Belgium at under-21 youth level.
