= Alexandre Bonnot =

French footballer (born 1973)

Personal information
- Date of birth: 31 July 1973 (age 53)
- Place of birth: Poissy, Yvelines, France
- Height: 1.73 m (5 ft 8 in)
- Position: Midfielder

Senior career*
Years	Team	Apps	(Gls)
1990–1995	Paris Saint-Germain	?	(?)
1995–1999	Angers	?	(?)
1998–1999	→ Watford (loan)	4	(0)
1999–2001	Watford	12	(0)
2001–2002	Queen's Park Rangers	22	(0)
Total		38	(0)
- * Club domestic league appearances and goals

Alexandre Bonnot (French: [alɛksɑ̃dʁ bɔno]; born 31 July 1973) is a French former footballer who played as a midfielder.

== Career ==
Bonnot started his professional career with Paris Saint-Germain in 1990, before joining SCO Angers in 1995. He had a loan spell with Watford for the 1998–99 season, before making the move permanent. He made 12 appearances for the Hornets during their 1999-2000 Premiership campaign. He fell out of favour next season and joined Queen's Park Rangers on a free transfer in 2001. After just one season with the club he retired.
