= Gary Fisken =

English footballer

Personal information
- Date of birth: 27 October 1981 (age 45)
- Place of birth: England
- Position: Midfielder

Youth career
- Watford

Senior career*
Years	Team	Apps	(Gls)
2001–2004	Watford	22	(1)
2004–2005	Swansea City	5	(0)
2006	Newport County		
2006–2007	Thurrock		
2013	Sun Sports		
- * Club domestic league appearances and goals

Gary Fisken (born 27 October 1981) is an English former footballer who is last known to have played as a midfielder for Sun Sports.

== Career ==
Fisken started his career with English second tier side Watford. In 2004, Fisken signed for Swansea City in the English fourth tier, where he made 8 appearances and scored 0 goals, helping them earn promotion to the English third tier. On 27 January 2005, he debuted for Swansea City during a 1–3 loss to Bury. Before the second half of 2005–06, Fisken signed for English sixth tier club Newport County. In 2013, he signed for Sun Sports in the English tenth tier.
