= James Panayi =

English footballer

Personal information
- Date of birth: 24 January 1980 (age 46)
- Place of birth: Hammersmith, England
- Position: Central defender

Senior career*
Years	Team	Apps	(Gls)
1998–2002	Watford	13	(0)
2003	Apollon Limassol		
- * Club domestic league appearances and goals

James Panayi (born 24 January 1980) is an English former professional footballer who played as a defender for Watford between 1998 and 2002.

He made his professional debut in a Premier League match at Coventry City's Highfield Road stadium on Sunday 31 October 1999.

After leaving Watford in 2002 he had a trial with Queens Park Rangers, later joining Cypriot side Apollon Limassol.
