= Nick Wright (footballer, born 1975) =

English footballer (born 1975)

Personal information
- Full name: Nicholas John Wright
- Date of birth: 15 October 1975 (age 51)
- Position: Forward

Senior career*
Years	Team	Apps	(Gls)
1994–1997	Derby County	0	(0)
1997–1998	Carlisle United	26	(5)
1998–2003	Watford	36	(6)
Total		62	(11)
- * Club domestic league appearances and goals

Nicholas John Wright (born 15 October 1975, in Codnor) is an English former professional footballer who played for Derby County, Carlisle United and Watford before his career was cut short by injury. Wright, who played as a forward, is best remembered for scoring an overhead kick in the 1999 Football League First Division play-off final, helping secure Watford's promotion to the Premier League. The following season in the top flight Wright only made four league appearances, though this included games against Chelsea, Arsenal and Manchester United.

== Honours ==
Watford

- Football League First Division play-offs: 1999
