= Neil Cox =

English footballer and manager

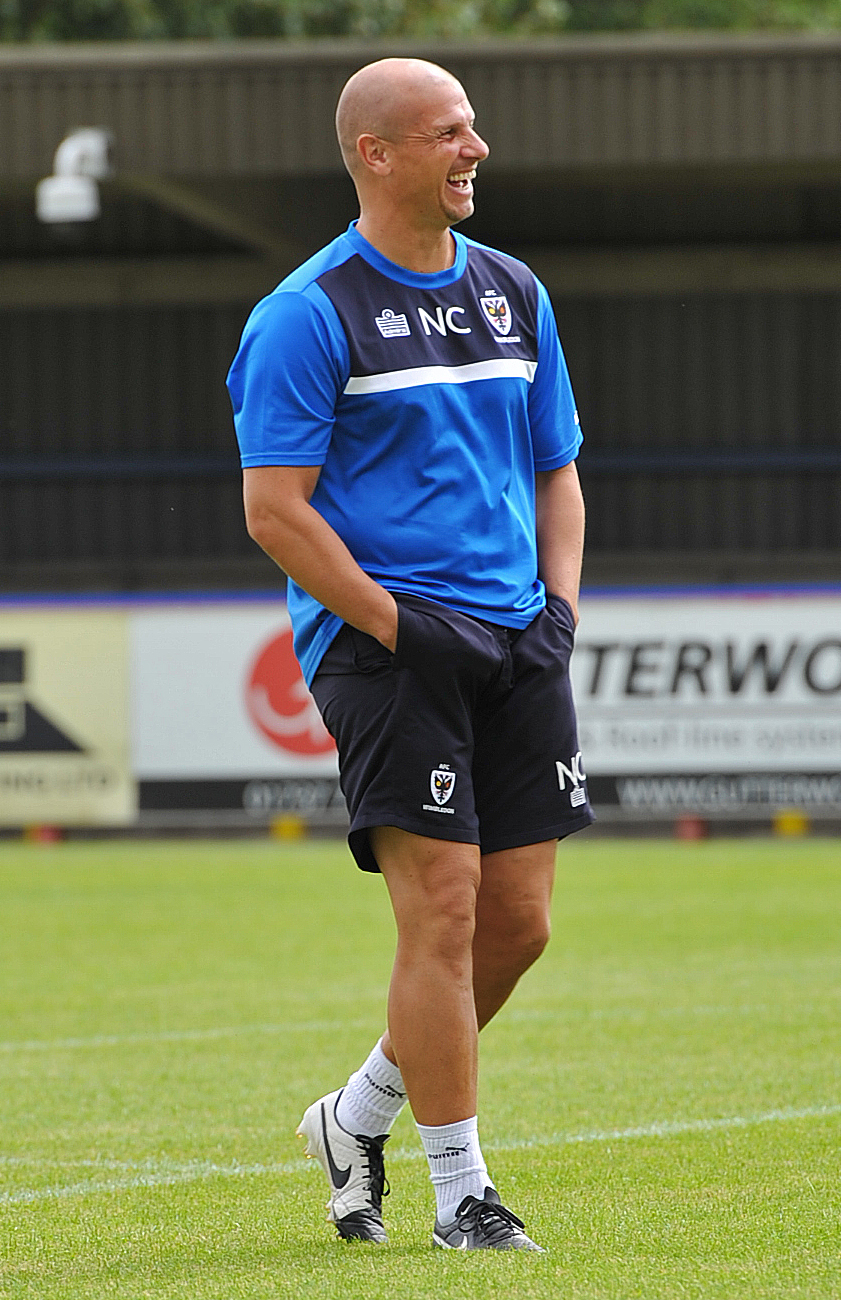
- Neil Cox during a coaching session with AFC Wimbledon

Personal information
- Full name: Neil James Cox
- Date of birth: 8 October 1971 (age 55)
- Place of birth: Scunthorpe, England
- Height: 6 ft 0 in (1.83 m)
- Position: Defender

Youth career
- 1985–1990: Scunthorpe United

Senior career*
Years	Team	Apps	(Gls)
1990–1991	Scunthorpe United	17	(1)
1991–1994	Aston Villa	40	(3)
1994–1997	Middlesbrough	106	(3)
1997–1999	Bolton Wanderers	80	(7)
1999–2005	Watford	219	(20)
2005–2006	Cardiff City	27	(2)
2006–2008	Crewe Alexandra	58	(1)
2010–2011	Leek Town	4	(0)
Total		551	(37)

International career
1993–1994	England U21	6	(0)

Managerial career
- 2010–2011: Leek Town
- 2012–2018: AFC Wimbledon (assistant)
- 2018–2020: Notts County (assistant)
- 2020–2021: Scunthorpe United
- * Club domestic league appearances and goals

Neil James Cox (born 8 October 1971) is an English former professional footballer and manager who is the assistant manager of National League club York City. A defender capable of playing at centre or right-back, he made over 500 appearances in the Football League during his career and was capped at Under-21 level by England. He began his career at Scunthorpe United as a youth player and was eventually offered a professional contract by the club, breaking into the first-team soon after. In 1991, Cox joined First Division side Aston Villa for a fee of £400,000, going on to make over 50 appearances for the side in all competitions, including playing in the club's victory over Manchester United in the 1994 Football League Cup Final, but struggled to establish himself in the first-team.

In 1994, he joined Middlesbrough, becoming the first player to break the £1 million transfer fee mark for the club. He made over 100 appearances for Middlesbrough, including playing in his second League Cup final in 1997, before moving to Bolton Wanderers in 1997 for £1.5 million. After two seasons at Bolton, Cox joined Watford. After a difficult start with the Hornets, which included being placed on the transfer list, Cox went on to captain the side and made over 200 appearances in all competitions for the club.

His final Football League club was then League One outfit Crewe Alexandra. Cox retired from professional football in 2008, going on to become a property developer in Portugal. Cox subsequently returned to the game in 2010 after being appointed manager of Leek Town. When the club had injury concerns Cox registered himself as a player with the league, making 4 appearances. Cox was in charge just one season before resigning for personal reasons. In October 2012, Cox joined Football League Two club AFC Wimbledon as assistant manager to former Watford teammate Neal Ardley. He left with Ardley on 12 November 2018. On 7 August 2020, Cox was appointed first team manager of Scunthorpe United. On 8 September 2023, he was confirmed as assistant manager of York City.

== Early life ==
Born in Scunthorpe, as a child, Cox attended Crosby Juniors School and later High Ridge Comprehensive now known as St Lawrence Academy.

== Playing career ==
=== Scunthorpe United ===
Cox began his career at his hometown club, the team he supported as a child, Scunthorpe United. Cox was involved with the team from an early age, being allowed to join in pre-season training sessions with the squad at the age of just 11. He was later allowed to train with the first-team by manager Frank Barlow at the age of 13 and was allowed to travel to an away game with the senior players. He gradually progressed through the youth ranks at the club before signing his first professional deal with the club in 1990, being handed a two-year deal, along with fellow youth graduates Graham Alexander and Richard Hall. Cox later revealed that he had been offered deals by other clubs but had remained with Scunthorpe as he was " a local lad and I just wanted to play for my local team." Following a downturn in the club's results, Hall and Cox were brought into the first-team by manager Mick Buxton and the pair's performances attracted attention from a number of clubs. Tottenham Hotspur discussed a potential double transfer for Cox and Hall but Hall later secured a move Southampton. Cox instead joined First Division side Aston Villa in February 1991 for a fee of £400,000, a club record for Scunthorpe at the time, as well as the installation of 2000 new seats at Glanford Park, after just one season with The Iron.

=== Aston Villa ===
Cox's move to the Villans progressed rapidly, receiving a call from Scunthorpe assistant manager Bill Green on a Sunday evening, signing for the club the following day before flying out to Hong Kong to join the first-team on Tuesday for pre-season training. Whilst at Villa, Cox played in the club's 3–1 victory over Manchester United in the 1994 League Cup Final, coming on as a substitute in the 79th minute in place of Steve Staunton.

=== Middlesbrough ===
In July 1994, Middlesbrough manager Bryan Robson, a boyhood idol of Cox's, confirmed a deal to sign Cox for a fee of £1 million, the first player to break the one million transfer fee mark for the club. Cox later stated that he believed that there was "a bit of pressure" on himself to impress due to the transfer fee involved in his move. The club achieved promotion to the Premier League in his first season, the club's final season playing at Ayresome Park, and Cox was named in the 1994–95 First Division team of the year.

Prior to the 1997 FA Cup Final, Cox became involved in an altercation with teammate Fabrizio Ravanelli after a heated debate over the Italian's fitness prior to the game leading to Cox being dropped on the morning of the final. Ravenelli insisted that he was fit to play in the game but later limped out of the match after just 24 minutes. Cox later stated that his biggest regret over the incident was "that I never played in an FA Cup final". Defeat for the side in the final completed a disastrous end to the season for the club as they also suffered defeat in the League Cup final and were relegated from the Premier League following a three-point deduction for failing to fulfil a fixture following a flu outbreak in the squad.

=== Bolton Wanderers ===
Cox played in the 1999 Football League First Division play-off final for Bolton, where they suffered a 2–0 defeat to Watford.

=== Watford ===
In November 1999, Cox joined Premier League side Watford, the side who had defeated his former club Bolton in the play-off final six months earlier to win promotion, for a fee of £500,000. He endured a difficult start to his career at Vicarage Road as he was brought in as a replacement for long time fan favourite Nigel Gibbs during a period in which the club struggled and eventually suffered relegation at the end of the 1999–2000 season. In 2001, Italian Gianluca Vialli was appointed manager of the club and Cox was one of a handful of first-team players left in England to train with the reserves as the squad traveled to Italy for a pre-season tour. Cox later stated that he was dropped by Vialli as outgoing manager Graham Taylor had expressed concern to him that Cox was a bad influence on the dressing room. Cox entered talks with a number of clubs but was unable to complete a move away from the Hornets as the club were unable to agree an acceptable transfer fee. He remained with the side into the new season and was eventually recalled to the first-team due to injury problems and formed a central defensive partnership with Filippo Galli, who Cox later described as "a world class player who was so down to earth".

During his final season at the club, Cox was forced to train with the club's youth team after falling out of favour.

=== Cardiff City ===
Following his release from Watford, Cox joined Cardiff City. He spent one season at Ninian Park, being hampered by injuries and the form of central defensive pairing Darren Purse and Glenn Loovens, making 27 league appearances and scoring twice, both goals coming during a 3–0 victory over Stoke City on 11 February 2006. In April 2006, with his contract ending on 30 June, Cox expressed his desire to stay at the club, stating "I'd love to stay at the club. I've enjoyed my year".

=== Crewe Alexandra ===
Cox scored twice for The Railwaymen. His first goal came in a 3–1 win over Cheltenham Town on 12 September 2006. He also scored against MK Dons in the FA Cup the following season. Cox signed for Crewe in June 2006 after being released by Cardiff City.

Cox retired at the end of the 2007–08 season; the home game against Oldham Athletic was the last of his career.

== Managerial career ==
=== Leek Town ===
In October 2010 he returned to the game after being appointed as the new manager of Leek Town. When the club had injury concerns Cox registered himself as a player with the league. In unexpected circumstances Cox resigned as Leek Town manager after a 1–0 home victory against Quorn, citing personal reasons.

=== AFC Wimbledon ===
On 10 October 2012, it was announced that Cox would reunite with former Watford and Cardiff teammate Neal Ardley, a friend of Cox's for over 20 years, as his assistant manager at Football League Two side AFC Wimbledon. Ardley had invited Cox to attend his interview for the managerial position at the club and the pair took charge of the club, replacing Terry Brown who had been sacked by the club after winning just one of the opening seven matches of the 2012–13 season, leaving the Dons in 21st position. Both Neal Ardley and Neil Cox left AFC Wimbledon on 12 November 2018 by mutual consent after a long stretch of defeats and poor team performances.

=== Scunthorpe United ===
On 7 August 2020, Cox was confirmed as first team manager of EFL League Two side Scunthorpe United. Following a disappointing start to the 2021–22 season, Cox was sacked on 1 November 2021 with his side sat bottom of the Football League with just eleven points from the first fifteen matches.

=== York City ===
On 8 September 2023, Cox was confirmed as assistant manager of York City.

== Managerial statistics ==
As of match played 30 October 2021

Managerial record by team and tenure
Team	Nat	From	To	Record					Ref
Team	Nat	From	To	G	W	D	L	Win %	Ref
Leek Town	(England)	6 October 2010	16 April 2011	31	10	3	18	32.26	
Scunthorpe United	(England)	7 August 2020	1 November 2021	69	15	15	39	21.74	
Total				100	25	18	57	25.00	—

== Honours ==
Aston Villa

- Football League Cup: 1993–94

Middlesbrough

- Football League First Division: 1994–95
- Football League Cup runner-up: 1996–97

Individual

- PFA Team of the Year: 1994–95 First Division
