= Steve Palmer (footballer) =

English footballer

Personal information
- Full name: Stephen Leonard Palmer
- Date of birth: 31 March 1968 (age 58)
- Place of birth: Brighton, England
- Height: 6 ft 1 in (1.85 m)
- Position: Defender

Youth career
- Cambridge University

Senior career*
Years	Team	Apps	(Gls)
1989–1995	Ipswich Town	110	(2)
1995–2001	Watford	234	(8)
2001–2004	Queens Park Rangers	127	(9)
2004–2006	Milton Keynes Dons	34	(1)
Total		505	(20)
- * Club domestic league appearances and goals

Stephen Leonard Palmer (born 31 March 1968) is an English former professional footballer who was previously the academy recruitment manager of Watford.

He played as a defender from 1989 until 2006, notably in the Premier League for Ipswich Town, before later going on to Watford, Queens Park Rangers and Milton Keynes Dons. Married with 3 daughters.

== Early life ==
Palmer attended Dorothy Stringer High School, Brighton, and Christ's College, Cambridge, and is the only professional footballer of the modern era to be educated at Cambridge University, obtaining a degree in software engineering in 1989. Whilst studying he played for Cambridge University A.F.C. In April 1987 he played a single first-class cricket match for a Cambridge University side also containing future England captain Mike Atherton. Facing Lancashire, Palmer dismissed former England player Graeme Fowler lbw for 49. He went on to score 18 with the bat, before being bowled by Paul Allott.

== Playing career ==
He turned professional with Ipswich Town in 1989 and spent six years at the club before making a £135,000 move to Watford. Palmer established himself as a first team regular during another near six-year spell at Vicarage Road and his departure on a free transfer in July 2001 caused some consternation amongst the club's supporters. Whilst at the club he broke Villa player, John Gregory's record by wearing every numbered shirt from 1 to 14 in the 1997–98 season. Placed in goal for the kick-off of the season's final home match versus AFC Bournemouth, he swapped shirts with goalkeeper Alec Chamberlain early in the game. He completed the set by wearing Jason Lee's number 9 shirt in the final match away at Fulham – in which Watford won the Division 2 title. Watford secured back-to-back promotion the following season, with Palmer voted Player of the Season.

Palmer signed for Queens Park Rangers in July 2001 and made his debut in August of that year in a 1–0 win against Stoke City. He was captain and ever present in what was QPR's first season in the third tier since 1966–67. In total Palmer made 95 league appearances for QPR, scoring 5 goals.

After leaving QPR in 2004 Palmer signed for Milton Keynes Dons, playing for the club for two seasons, scoring once against Blackpool.

== Coaching career ==
He retired from football in October 2005 and took up a position as Tottenham Hotspur's Academy Performance Manager a month later.

In December 2011 Palmer returned to Watford as Academy Recruitment Manager, leaving again in June 2012 to work with the Premier League setting up a performance tracking system for the Elite Player Performance Plan (EPPP).

== Honours ==
Ipswich Town

- Football League Second Division: 1991–92

Watford

- Football League First Division play-offs: 1999
- Football League Second Division: 1997–98
