= 1999 Football League play-offs =

Football League play-offs
- Season: 1998–99
- Champions: Watford (First Division); Manchester City (Second Division); Scunthorpe United (Third Division)
- Matches: 15
- Goals: 28 (1.87 per match)
- Biggest home win: Scunthorpe 3–1 Swansea (Third Division)
- Biggest away win: None
- Highest scoring: Ipswich 4–3 Bolton (7 goals)
- Highest attendance: 76,935 – Gillingham v Manchester City (Second Division final)
- Lowest attendance: 6,762 – Wigan v Manchester City (Second Division semi-final)
- Average attendance: 24,837

The Football League play-offs for the 1998–99 season were held in May 1999, with the finals taking place at the old Wembley Stadium in London. The play-off semi-finals were played over two legs and contested by the teams who finished in 3rd, 4th, 5th and 6th place in the Football League First Division and Football League Second Division and the 4th, 5th, 6th and 7th placed teams in the Football League Third Division table. The winners of the semi-finals went through to the finals, with the winner of the matches gaining promotion for the following season.

== Background ==
The Football League play-offs have been held every year since 1987. They take place for each division following the conclusion of the regular season and are contested by the four clubs finishing below the automatic promotion places.

In the First Division, Ipswich Town, who were aiming to return to the top flight after a 4-year absence, finished one point behind second placed Bradford City, who in turn finished 18 points behind champions Sunderland, who returned to the top flight after being relegated two seasons previously. Birmingham City, who were aiming to return to the top flight after 13 years outside the top division, finished in fourth place in the table. Watford, who were aiming to return to the top flight for the first time since 1988, finished in fifth place. Bolton Wanderers, who were aiming to return to the top flight after relegation the previous season, finished one point behind Watford in sixth place.

== First Division ==
| Pos | Team | Pld | W | D | L | GF | GA | GD | Pts |
|---|---|---|---|---|---|---|---|---|---|
| 3 | Ipswich Town | 46 | 25 | 12 | 9 | 71 | 42 | +29 | 87 |
| 4 | Birmingham City | 46 | 24 | 10 | 12 | 88 | 67 | +21 | 82 |
| 5 | Watford | 46 | 22 | 11 | 13 | 65 | 44 | +21 | 77 |
| 6 | Bolton Wanderers | 46 | 21 | 13 | 12 | 69 | 50 | +19 | 76 |

=== Semi-finals ===
First leg

16 May 1999
13:00

| Bolton Wanderers | 1–0 | Ipswich Town |
|---|---|---|
| Johansen 84' |

Reebok Stadium, Bolton
Attendance: 18,295
Referee: Mark Halsey

16 May 1999
13:00

| Watford | 1–0 | Birmingham City |
|---|---|---|
| Ngonge 5' |

Vicarage Road, Watford
Attendance: 18,535
Referee: Clive Wilkes

Second leg

19 May 1999
19:45

| Ipswich Town | 4–3 (a.e.t.) | Bolton Wanderers |
|---|---|---|
| Holland 14', 116'; Dyer 52', 90' | | Taylor 51', 96'; Frandsen 84' |

Portman Road, Ipswich
Attendance: 21,755
Referee: John Kirkby

Ipswich Town 4–4 Bolton Wanderers on aggregate. Bolton Wanderers won on away goals.

20 May 1999
19:45

| Birmingham City | 1–0 (a.e.t.) | Watford |
|---|---|---|
| Adebola 2' | Report |
Penalties
| Furlong (penalty missed); Grainger (penalty scored); Rowett (penalty scored); Bradbury (penalty scored); Hughes (penalty scored); Purse (penalty scored); Poole (penalty scored); Holland (penalty missed) | 6–7 | (penalty scored) Kennedy; (penalty missed) Palmer; (penalty scored) Johnson; (penalty scored) Bazeley; (penalty scored) Mooney; (penalty scored) Page; (penalty scored) Smart; (penalty scored) Hazan |

St Andrew's, Birmingham
Attendance: 29,100
Referee: David Pugh

Birmingham City 1–1 Watford on aggregate. Watford won 7–6 on penalties.

=== Final ===
31 May 1999
15:00

| Bolton Wanderers | 0–2 | Watford |
|---|---|---|
| | Report | Wright 38'; Smart 89' |

Wembley Stadium, London
Attendance: 70,343
Referee: Terry Heilbron

== Second Division ==
| Pos | Team | Pld | W | D | L | GF | GA | GD | Pts |
|---|---|---|---|---|---|---|---|---|---|
| 3 | Manchester City | 46 | 22 | 16 | 8 | 69 | 33 | +36 | 82 |
| 4 | Gillingham | 46 | 22 | 14 | 10 | 75 | 44 | +31 | 80 |
| 5 | Preston North End | 46 | 22 | 13 | 11 | 78 | 50 | +28 | 79 |
| 6 | Wigan Athletic | 46 | 22 | 10 | 14 | 75 | 48 | +27 | 76 |

=== Semi-finals ===
First leg

15 May 1999
14:00

| Wigan Athletic | 1–1 | Manchester City |
|---|---|---|
| Barlow 1' | | Dickov 76' |

Springfield Park, Wigan
Attendance: 6,762
Referee: Alan Wiley

16 May 1999
15:00

| Preston North End | 1–1 | Gillingham |
|---|---|---|
| Eyres 54' | | Taylor 79' |

Deepdale, Preston
Attendance: 18,584
Referee: John Kirkby

Second leg

19 May 1999
19:45

| Gillingham | 1–0 | Preston North End |
|---|---|---|
| Hessenthaler 2' |

Priestfield Stadium, Gillingham
Attendance: 10,105
Referee: Mark Halsey

Gillingham won 2–1 on aggregate.

19 May 1999
19:45

| Manchester City | 1–0 | Wigan Athletic |
|---|---|---|
| Goater 27' |

Maine Road, Manchester
Attendance: 31,305
Referee: Terry Heilbron

Manchester City won 2–1 on aggregate.

=== Final ===
30 May 1999
15:00

| Gillingham | 2–2 (a.e.t.) | Manchester City |
|---|---|---|
| Asaba 82'; Taylor 87' | Report | Horlock 90'; Dickov 90+5' |
Penalties
| Smith (penalty missed); Pennock (penalty missed); Hodge (penalty scored); Butters (penalty missed) | 1–3 | (penalty scored) Horlock; (penalty missed) Dickov; (penalty scored) Cooke; (penalty scored) Edghill |

Wembley Stadium, London
Attendance: 76,935
Referee: Mark Halsey

== Third Division ==
| Pos | Team | Pld | W | D | L | GF | GA | GD | Pts |
|---|---|---|---|---|---|---|---|---|---|
| 4 | Scunthorpe United | 46 | 22 | 8 | 16 | 69 | 58 | +11 | 74 |
| 5 | Rotherham United | 46 | 20 | 13 | 13 | 79 | 61 | +18 | 73 |
| 6 | Leyton Orient | 46 | 19 | 15 | 12 | 68 | 59 | +9 | 72 |
| 7 | Swansea City | 46 | 19 | 14 | 13 | 56 | 48 | +8 | 71 |

=== Semi-finals ===
First leg

16 May 1999
12:30

| Leyton Orient | 0–0 | Rotherham United |

Brisbane Road, London
Attendance: 9,419
Referee: Terry Heilbron

16 May 1999
12:30

| Swansea City | 1–0 | Scunthorpe United |
|---|---|---|
| Bound 44' |

Vetch Field, Swansea
Attendance: 7,828
Referee: David Pugh

Second leg

19 May 1999
19:45

| Rotherham United | 0–0 (a.e.t.) | Leyton Orient |
Penalties
| Thompson (penalty scored); Roscoe (penalty missed); Hurst (penalty missed); Williams (penalty scored) | 2–4 | (penalty scored) Smith; (penalty scored) Ling; (penalty scored) Morrison; (penalty scored) Lockwood |

Millmoor, Rotherham
Attendance: 9,529
Referee: Clive Wilkes

Rotherham United 0–0 Leyton Orient on aggregate. Leyton Orient won 4–2 on penalties.

19 May 1999
19:45

| Scunthorpe United | 3–1 (a.e.t.) | Swansea City |
|---|---|---|
| Dawson 2'; Sheldon 92', 102' | | Bird 98' |

Glanford Park, Scunthorpe
Attendance: 7,089
Referee: Alan Wiley

Scunthorpe United won 3–2 on aggregate.

=== Final ===
29 May 1999
15:00

| Leyton Orient | 0–1 | Scunthorpe United |
|---|---|---|
| | Report | Calvo García 6' |

Wembley Stadium, London
Attendance: 36,985
Referee: Clive Wilkes
