= Peter Kennedy (footballer) =

Northern Irish footballer

Personal information
- Full name: Peter Henry James Kennedy
- Date of birth: 10 September 1973 (age 53)
- Place of birth: Lisburn, Northern Ireland
- Height: 5 ft 10 in (1.78 m)
- Positions: Defender; midfielder

Youth career
- Lisburn Youth

Senior career*
| Years | Team | Apps | (Gls) |
| 1989–1992 | Glentoran | 0 | (0) |
| 1992–1995 | Glenavon | 39 | (7) |
| 1995–1996 | Portadown | 23 | (10) |
| 1996–1997 | Notts County | 22 | (0) |
| 1997–2001 | Watford | 114 | (18) |
| 2001–2004 | Wigan Athletic | 65 | (2) |
| 2003 | → Derby County (loan) | 5 | (1) |
| 2004–2006 | Peterborough United | 31 | (2) |
| 2006–2008 | Portadown | | |
| 2009–2010 | Donegal Celtic | | |
| 2009–2010 | Kilmore Rec | | |

International career
| 1997 | Northern Ireland B | 1 | (0) |
| 1998–2004 | Northern Ireland | 20 | (0) |
- * Club domestic league appearances and goals

Peter Kennedy (born 10 September 1973) is a Northern Irish former professional footballer who played as a defender or midfielder.

== Career ==
In 1995–96, he was named as the Ulster Footballer of the Year. After his first spell in Northern Ireland he had a successful spell in English football, initially joining Notts County in August 1996 where he scored once against Newcastle Town in the FA Cup, before moving onto Watford a season later, where he led the Hornets to promotion to Division One as their highest goalscorer. He scored two goals in quick succession in the derby with Luton Town, a hat-trick against Southend United, and a splendid long-range effort against Sheffield Wednesday in the FA Cup. The following season was arguably the highlight of his career as he helped Watford gain promotion to the Premier League in 1999. In the Premier League, he scored Watford's first goal of the season, a penalty against Wimbledon. He left Watford at the end of the 2000–01 campaign and spent three seasons at Wigan, spending a period on loan at Derby County where he scored once against Ipswich Town. His final English club was Peterborough United, after which he returned to Northern Ireland. At the end of the 2007–08 season Peter did not have his contract renewed by Portadown and left the club. He began training with Ballymena United FC but decided to retire from his footballing career to focus on becoming an accountant. After a year Peter came out of retirement and made a return to football by signing for Donegal Celtic FC who play in the IFA Championship.

== Personal life ==
He has three children: Annie, Olivia and Peter. He was born in Lisburn. He is the uncle of Kerry Beattie who is also a footballer.

== Honours ==
Watford

- Football League First Division play-offs: 1999
- Football League Second Division: 1997–98

Wigan Athletic

- Football League Second Division: 2002–03

Individual

- PFA Team of the Year: 1997–98 Second Division
