= Gifton Noel-Williams =

English former footballer (born 1980)

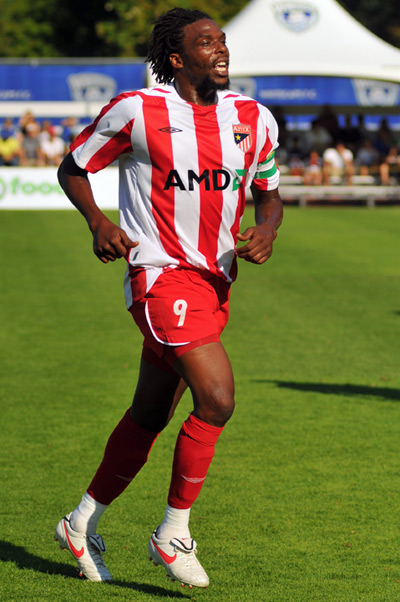
- Noel-Williams with the Austin Aztex in 2009

Personal information
- Full name: Gifton Ruben Elisha Noel-Williams
- Date of birth: 21 January 1980 (age 46)
- Place of birth: Islington, London, England
- Height: 1.91 m (6 ft 3 in)
- Position: Striker

Team information
- Current team: Bahamas (manager)

Youth career
- Islington St Mary's

Senior career*
Years	Team	Apps	(Gls)
1996–2003	Watford	169	(33)
2003–2005	Stoke City	88	(23)
2005–2007	Burnley	51	(7)
2006	→ Brighton & Hove Albion (loan)	7	(2)
2007	Real Murcia	10	(4)
2007–2008	Elche	21	(5)
2008–2009	Millwall	1	(0)
2008	→ Yeovil Town (loan)	6	(0)
2009	Austin Aztex	16	(3)
2010	DFW Tornados	9	(0)
2015	Daventry Town		
2017	Codicote	3	(0)
Total		381	(77)

International career
1997	England U18	3	(0)

Managerial career
- 2016: Burnham
- 2017: Codicote
- 2021: Watford Women (interim)
- 2023: Real Kashmir
- 2026: Walthamstow
- 2026–: Bahamas
- * Club domestic league appearances and goals

Gifton Ruben Elisha Noel-Williams (born 21 January 1980) is an English former football player and manager. He played as a striker for Watford, Stoke City and Burnley among other clubs. After a serious knee injury in 1999, he was affected by rheumatoid arthritis for much of the rest of his career.

He retired from professional football in 2010 and moved into coaching, briefly managing Burnham in 2016 and Codicote in 2017 and was the interim manager of Watford Women. In 2023, he managed Real Kashmir in India.

== Playing career ==
=== Watford ===
Born in Islington, Noel-Williams started his professional career at Watford where he spent a seven-year spell playing 127 games and scoring 43 goals. Aged 19, he was Watford's top goalscorer in the 1998–99 season, at the end of which they were promoted to the Premiership. However, his season ended in February 1999, when he seriously injured his knee after a challenge from Sunderland defender, Paul Butler. He had received his first call-up to the England Under-21 squad on the day of the game. Arthritis in both of his knees restricted him to just three appearances during Watford's single season in the Premiership.

=== Stoke City and Burnley ===
Noel-Williams joined Stoke City on a free transfer on 2 June 2003, playing 83 games and scoring 23 goals in two years. He was Stoke's top goalscorer in the 2004–05 season, with 11 goals.

On 14 June 2005, Noel-Williams joined Burnley on a free transfer. He spent the latter part of the 2005–06 season on loan at Brighton & Hove Albion before returning to Burnley at the end of the season. He remained a Burnley player, despite being made available for a transfer throughout the close season, and, after an improvement in form was taken off the transfer list on 22 September 2006.

On 12 September 2006, Noel-Williams scored his first ever professional hat-trick in Burnley's 4–2 victory over Barnsley. He played 56 times for the Clarets scoring 7 goals, the last against Leeds United in November 2006.

=== Later career ===
On 31 January 2007, Noel-Williams joined Real Murcia for a fee of around £50,000, signing an 18-month deal and becoming only the second English player to represent the Spanish side, after Tom Thompson, who was player-coach in the 1920s. Upon Real Murcia's promotion to La Liga, Noel-Williams was transferred to Elche CF who finished 18 points behind Murcia in the Segunda División.

In 2008, Noel-Williams returned to England, signing a short-term contract with League One side Millwall. He was subsequently loaned to another club in the division, Yeovil Town.

In January 2009, Noel-Williams moved to the United States to join American team Austin Aztex FC, signing a two-year contract. The club has a co-operation agreement with Noel-Williams' former club, Stoke City.

He was released by the Aztex at the end of the 2009 season, having made 16 appearances and scored three goals for the Texas club. He signed with the amateur DFW Tornados of the USL Premier Development League in 2010, but the club folded at the end of the 2010 season.

In February 2015, after nearly five years out of football, Noel-Williams came out of retirement to sign for Southern Football League side Daventry Town, who were managed by his former Watford teammate Allan Smart.

== Coaching career ==
In 2011, while still living in the United States, Noel-Williams was an assistant soccer coach at Brentwood Christian School, a private academy in Austin. Upon returning to England, he worked as a coach at Westfield Academy school in Watford, before being appointed as the Reserves and Under-18's manager at Northwood in June 2016. On 26 September 2016, Noel-Williams was announced as the new manager of the non-league club Burnham. In October, he signed his 18-year-old son Dejon, a youth team striker at Oxford United, on a work experience deal. He parted company with Burnham in November 2016, having struggled to combine the role with other coaching commitments.

In June 2017, Noel-Williams was appointed manager of Codicote. He was sacked in November after the club lost 12 of their first 14 league matches. In October 2019, Noel-Williams was appointed assistant manager at Billericay Town, a position he held until June 2020. He has said that because of his race, unconscious bias may have played a part in limiting his coaching opportunities.

In January 2021, Noel-Williams became a striker coach at Portsmouth on a part-time basis, in addition to his work for the Professional Footballers' Association. In December 2021, he was appointed interim manager of Watford Women.

On 16 August 2022, Noel-Williams was appointed as a coach supporting the England youth teams as part of The Football Association and Professional Footballers' Association's joint England Elite Coach Programme (EECP). In February 2023, he was appointed head coach of Indian I-League club Real Kashmir. In his very first match on 8 February, the "snow leopards" achieved 4–2 win against Sudeva Delhi. He was later appointed technical director of the club.

Later in 2023, Noel-Williams became technical director of the Grenada Football Association, alongside Terry Connor.

On 13 May 2026, Noel-Williams was appointed manager of Isthmian League North Division club Walthamstow. On 19 July 2026, Noel-Williams left Walthamstow without managing a competitive game for the club.

== Personal life ==
Born in England, Noel-Williams is of Grenadian descent. His father died when Gifton was 13. He became a father himself at the age of 16. His son Dejon Noel-Williams is also a professional footballer, and has represented the Grenada national football team.

His son, Isaiah Noel-Williams, plays professional football for Barnet Football ClubHis older son is a professional footballer, Dejon Noel-Williams, who plays for Bedford Town F.C.

He coached the team on 2023 BBC documentary Boot Dreams: Now or Never, about young footballers trying to gain a professional contract.

Noel-Williams began growing dreadlocks around 2008 in solidarity with a Rastafarian uncle who had lost his through chemotherapy. He said that he had been advised to cut his hair in order to further his opportunities in media or management, but refused.

== Career statistics ==
Appearances and goals by club, season and competition
Club	Season	League			FA Cup		League Cup		Total	
Club	Season	Division	Apps	Goals	Apps	Goals	Apps	Goals	Apps	Goals
Watford	1996–97	Second Division	25	2	2	1	1	0	28	3
Watford	1997–98	Second Division	38	7	4	3	3	1	45	11
Watford	1998–99	First Division	28	10	1	0	0	0	29	10
Watford	1999–2000	Premiership	3	0	0	0	0	0	3	0
Watford	2000–01	First Division	32	8	1	0	3	0	36	8
Watford	2001–02	First Division	29	6	1	1	5	2	35	9
Watford	2002–03	First Division	16	6	3	0	0	0	19	6
Watford	Total		169	33	12	5	12	3	193	41
Stoke City	2003–04	First Division	42	10	1	0	1	0	44	10
Stoke City	2004–05	Championship	46	13	0	0	1	0	47	13
Stoke City	Total		88	23	1	0	2	0	91	23
Burnley	2005–06	Championship	29	2	0	0	3	0	32	2
Burnley	2006–07	Championship	23	5	1	0	0	0	24	5
Burnley	Total		52	7	1	0	3	0	56	7
Brighton & Hove Albion (loan)	2005–06	Championship	7	2	0	0	―		7	2
Real Murcia	2006–07	Segunda División	10	4	0	0	―		10	4
Elche	2007–08	Segunda División	21	5	0	0	―		21	5
Millwall	2008–09	League One	1	0	0	0	0	0	1	0
Yeovil Town (loan)	2008–09	League One	6	0	2	0	0	0	8	0
Austin Aztex	2009	USL First Division	16	3	0	0	―		16	3
DFW Tornados	2010	USL Premier Development League	9	0	1	0	―		10	0
Codicote	2017–18	Spartan South Midlands League First Division	3	0	0	0	―		3	0
Career total			382	77	17	5	17	3	416	85

== Honours ==
Watford

- Football League Second Division: 1997–98
