= 2002–03 Watford F.C. season =

English football team season

Watford
2002–03 season
- Chairman: Graham Simpson
- Manager: Ray Lewington
- Stadium: Vicarage Road
- First Division: 13th
- FA Cup: Semi-finals
- League Cup: First round
- Top goalscorer: League: Helguson (11); All: Helguson (13)
- Average home league attendance: 13,405

The 2002–03 season marked Watford Football Club's third consecutive season in the Football League First Division, following relegation from the Premier League in the 1999–2000 season. The club was managed by its former reserve team manager Ray Lewington, following the dismissal of Gianluca Vialli at the end of 2001–02. The club finished 13th in the First Division, reached the semi-final of the FA Cup, and were eliminated in the first round of the League Cup. Watford were operating under severe financial constraints following the collapse of ITV Digital, and at the end of the season were forced to offload several first-team players, including Tommy Smith, Gifton Noel-Williams, Stephen Glass, and record signing Allan Nielsen.

== Season review ==
Over the summer many of the Vialli's signings left the club. Lewington had few funds to strengthen the side. The extent of Watford's financial difficulties was exposed in the autumn, along with many League clubs, following the collapse of ITV Digital. The club was facing administration when the players and staff agreed a 12% wage deferral. Exacerbating the club's difficulties were the large payoffs they had had to make to Vialli and several players on terminating their contracts, and Vialli's decision to sue the club early in 2003. The club started the season well, however, despite the players having to agree to a pay-cut during October, and finished in mid-table. An unexpected run to the FA Cup semi-final, where Watford lost to Premiership side Southampton, also generated vital cash.

== Final league table ==
Pos	Team	Pld	W	D	L	GF	GA	GD	Pts
11	Gillingham	46	16	14	16	56	65	−9	62
12	Preston North End	46	16	13	17	68	70	−2	61
13	Watford	46	17	9	20	54	70	−16	60
14	Crystal Palace	46	14	17	15	59	52	+7	59
15	Rotherham United	46	15	14	17	62	62	0	59

Updated to match(es) played on 11 May 2003. Source: Soccerway
Rules for classification: 1) points; 2) goal difference; 3) number of goals scored.

== Results ==
Watford's score comes first

=== Legend ===
Win	Draw	Loss

=== Football League First Division ===
Date	Opponent	Venue	Result	Attendance	Scorers
10 August 2002	Leicester City	A	0–2	31,022	
13 August 2002	Millwall	H	0–0	11,187	
17 August 2002	Wimbledon	H	3–2	10,292	Webber, Robinson, Nielsen
24 August 2002	Portsmouth	A	0–3	17,901	
26 August 2002	Coventry City	H	5–2	11,136	Glass, T Smith, Webber, Nielsen, Robinson
31 August 2002	Norwich City	A	0–4	20,563	
7 September 2002	Walsall	H	2–0	10,528	T Smith, Foley
14 September 2002	Nottingham Forest	A	1–0	17,865	Cox
17 September 2002	Preston North End	A	1–1	12,408	Robinson
21 September 2002	Crystal Palace	H	3–3	12,153	Ardley, Hyde, Helguson
28 September 2002	Sheffield United	A	2–1	16,301	Cox (pen), Helguson
5 October 2002	Brighton & Hove Albion	H	1–0	15,305	Helguson
12 October 2002	Grimsby Town	H	2–0	13,821	Foley, T Smith
19 October 2002	Gillingham	A	0–3	8,728	
26 October 2002	Sheffield Wednesday	H	1–0	15,058	Helguson
30 October 2002	Stoke City	A	2–1	11,215	Helguson, Cox
2 November 2002	Wolverhampton Wanderers	H	1–1	16,524	Cox
9 November 2002	Rotherham United	A	1–2	6,790	Foley
17 November 2002	Ipswich Town	H	0–2	16,184	
23 November 2002	Reading	A	0–1	17,465	
30 November 2002	Burnley	H	2–1	13,977	Helguson, T Smith (pen)
7 December 2002	Derby County	A	0–3	21,653	
14 December 2002	Ipswich Town	A	2–4	22,985	T Smith, Cox
21 December 2002	Bradford City	H	1–0	12,579	Cox (pen)
26 December 2002	Wimbledon	A	0–0	2,643	
28 December 2002	Leicester City	H	1–2	16,017	Helguson
1 January 2003	Portsmouth	H	2–2	15,048	Hyde, Cox
11 January 2003	Millwall	A	0–4	9,030	
19 January 2003	Norwich City	H	2–1	13,338	Nielsen, Helguson
1 February 2003	Coventry City	A	1–0	17,393	Hyde
8 February 2003	Rotherham United	H	1–2	15,025	T Smith
22 February 2003	Walsall	A	0–2	7,705	
25 February 2003	Wolverhampton Wanderers	A	0–0	24,591	
1 March 2003	Nottingham Forest	H	1–1	17,934	Helguson
4 March 2003	Preston North End	H	0–1	11,101	
15 March 2003	Grimsby Town	A	0–1	4,847	
18 March 2003	Gillingham	H	0–1	10,492	
22 March 2003	Stoke City	H	1–2	12,570	Helguson
29 March 2003	Sheffield Wednesday	A	2–2	17,086	T Smith, Norville
5 April 2003	Burnley	A	7–4	10,208	Brown, Hyde, Cox, Chopra (4)
8 April 2003	Crystal Palace	A	1–0	14,051	Hunt (own goal)
19 April 2003	Bradford City	A	1–2	11,145	Helguson
21 April 2003	Derby County	H	2–0	11,909	Chopra, Ardley
26 April 2003	Brighton & Hove Albion	A	0–4	6,841	
30 April 2003	Reading	H	0–3	11,814	
4 May 2003	Sheffield United	H	2–0	14,320	Cox, Fitzgerald

=== FA Cup ===
Round	Date	Opponent	Venue	Result	Attendance	Goalscorers
R3	4 January 2003	Macclesfield Town	A	2–0	4,244	Helguson, Pennant
R4	25 January 2003	West Bromwich Albion	H	1–0	16,975	Helguson
R5	15 February 2003	Sunderland	A	1–0	26,916	T Smith
QF	9 March 2003	Burnley	H	2–0	20,336	T Smith, Glass
SF	13 April 2003	Southampton	N	1–2	42,602	Gayle

=== League Cup ===
Round	Date	Opponent	Venue	Result	Attendance	Goalscorers
R1	10 September 2002	Luton Town	H	1–2	14,171	Foley

== Players ==
=== First-team squad ===
Squad at end of season

Note: Flags indicate national team as defined under FIFA eligibility rules; some limited exceptions apply. Players may hold more than one non-FIFA nationality.

No.	Pos.	Nation	Player
1	GK	ENG	Alec Chamberlain
2	MF	ENG	Neal Ardley
3	DF	ENG	Paul Robinson
4	MF	ENG	Paolo Vernazza
5	DF	ENG	Neil Cox
6	DF	ENG	Sean Dyche
7	MF	DEN	Allan Nielsen
8	MF	JAM	Micah Hyde (Note: Hyde was born in Newham, England, but also qualified to represent Jamaica internationally and made his international debut for Jamaica in 2001.)
9	FW	ENG	Tommy Smith
10	DF	ENG	Wayne Brown
11	MF	SCO	Stephen Glass
12	MF	ENG	Gavin Mahon
14	MF	AUS	Richard Johnson
15	FW	ENG	Gifton Noel-Williams
16	MF	ENG	Anthony McNamee

No.	Pos.	Nation	Player
18	FW	ISL	Heiðar Helguson
19	DF	ENG	Jerel Ifil
20	DF	ENG	Lloyd Doyley (Note: Doyley was born in Tower Hamlets, England, but also qualified to represent Jamaica internationally and would make his international debut for Jamaica in March 2013.)
21	FW	IRL	Dominic Foley
22	MF	ENG	Lee Cook
23	MF	ENG	Jamie Hand
24	FW	TRI	Jason Norville
25	MF	ENG	Gary Fisken
27	DF	JAM	Marcus Gayle (Note: Gayle was born in Hammersmith, London, and represented them at U-18 level, but also qualified to represent Jamaica internationally through his father and made his international debut for Jamaica in 1998.)
28	MF	ENG	Sam Swonnell
29	MF	ENG	Jermaine Pennant (on loan from Arsenal)
30	GK	ENG	Richard Lee
31	DF	ENG	Jack Smith
32	MF	CAN	Elliott Godfrey
33	FW	ENG	Scott Fitzgerald

=== Left club during season ===
Note: Flags indicate national team as defined under FIFA eligibility rules; some limited exceptions apply. Players may hold more than one non-FIFA nationality.

No.	Pos.	Nation	Player
10	MF	ENG	Stephen Hughes (released)
13	GK	NOR	Espen Baardsen (Note: Baardsen was born in San Rafael, California, United States, and represented them at U-18 level, but also qualified to represent Norway internationally through his parents and made his international debut for Norway in September 1998.) (to Everton)
17	FW	ENG	Nick Wright (retired)

No.	Pos.	Nation	Player
17	FW	ENG	Michael Chopra (on loan from Newcastle United)
29	FW	ENG	Danny Webber (on loan from Manchester United)

=== Reserve squad ===
Note: Flags indicate national team as defined under FIFA eligibility rules; some limited exceptions apply. Players may hold more than one non-FIFA nationality.

No.	Pos.	Nation	Player
26	MF	BRB	Fabian Forde (Note: Forde was born in Harrow, England, but also qualified to represent Barbados internationally and made his international debut for Barbados in November 2002.)

== See also ==
- Luton Town F.C. and Watford F.C. rivalry
- List of Watford F.C. seasons
