= 2003–04 Watford F.C. season =

English football team season

Watford
2003–04 season
- Chairman: Graham Simpson
- Manager: Ray Lewington
- Stadium: Vicarage Road
- First Division: 16th
- FA Cup: Third round
- League Cup: Second round
- Top goalscorer: League: Scott Fitzgerald (10); All: Scott Fitzgerald (11)
- Average home league attendance: 14,855

During the 2003–04 English football season, Watford F.C. competed in the First Division.

== Season summary ==
The ongoing financial difficulties saw a large number of players released that summer, including record signing Allan Nielsen and strikers Tommy Smith and Gifton Noel-Williams. To make matters worse, Manchester United loanee Jimmy Davis was killed in a car crash on the opening day of the new campaign. This had a huge effect on the team's form at the beginning of the season, and notably on his close friend Danny Webber. But a strong finish to the season saw the club finish in mid-table.

== Final league table ==
Pos	Team	Pld	W	D	L	GF	GA	GD	Pts
14	Nottingham Forest	46	15	15	16	61	58	+3	60
15	Preston North End	46	15	14	17	69	71	−2	59
16	Watford	46	15	12	19	54	68	−14	57
17	Rotherham United	46	13	15	18	53	61	−8	54
18	Crewe Alexandra	46	14	11	21	57	66	−9	53

Source: Soccerway
Rules for classification: 1) points; 2) goal difference; 3) number of goals scored.

== Results ==
Watford's score comes first

=== Legend ===
Win	Draw	Loss

=== Football League First Division ===
Date	Opponent	Venue	Result	Attendance	Scorers
16 August 2003	Crystal Palace	A	0–1	15,333	
23 August 2003	West Bromwich Albion	H	0–1	15,023	
25 August 2003	Sunderland	A	0–2	23,600	
30 August 2003	Gillingham	H	2–2	12,793	Helguson, Webber
13 September 2003	Millwall	H	3–1	11,305	Dyer, Cox (pen), Young
17 September 2003	Derby County	A	2–3	18,459	Gayle, Young
20 September 2003	Wigan Athletic	A	0–1	9,211	
27 September 2003	Ipswich Town	H	1–2	15,350	Fitzgerald
30 September 2003	Burnley	H	1–1	11,573	Fitzgerald
4 October 2003	Crewe Alexandra	A	1–0	7,055	Webber
14 October 2003	Walsall	H	1–1	12,231	Baird (own goal)
18 October 2003	Bradford City	H	1–0	12,399	Fitzgerald
21 October 2003	Coventry City	H	1–1	13,487	Fitzgerald
25 October 2003	Wimbledon	A	3–1	6,115	Devlin, Webber, Fitzgerald
28 October 2003	Cardiff City	A	0–3	14,011	
1 November 2003	Rotherham United	H	1–0	18,067	Webber
4 November 2003	Preston North End	A	1–2	11,152	Webber
8 November 2003	Nottingham Forest	A	1–1	21,229	Cook
15 November 2003	Norwich City	A	2–1	16,420	Fitzgerald, Cox (pen)
22 November 2003	West Ham United	H	0–0	20,950	
29 November 2003	Reading	A	1–2	14,521	Cook
6 December 2003	Nottingham Forest	H	1–1	14,988	Fitzgerald
13 December 2003	Sheffield United	A	2–2	18,637	Smith, Helguson
20 December 2003	Stoke City	H	1–3	13,732	Helguson
26 December 2003	Gillingham	A	0–1	8,971	
28 December 2003	Cardiff City	H	2–1	15,512	Fitzgerald, Cook
10 January 2004	Coventry City	A	0–0	12,226	
17 January 2004	Crystal Palace	H	1–5	15,017	Helguson (pen)
31 January 2004	West Bromwich Albion	A	1–3	23,958	Fitzgerald
7 February 2004	Sunderland	H	2–2	16,798	Mahon, Cox (pen)
14 February 2004	Preston North End	H	2–0	12,675	Bouazza, Devlin
21 February 2004	Walsall	A	1–0	6,684	Cook
28 February 2004	Wimbledon	H	4–0	15,323	Cook, Cox (pen), Smith, Ardley
3 March 2004	Stoke City	A	1–3	13,108	Helguson
9 March 2004	Bradford City	A	0–2	17,143	
13 March 2004	Sheffield United	H	0–2	13,861	
16 March 2004	Derby County	H	2–1	13,931	Helguson, Mahon
20 March 2004	Ipswich Town	A	1–4	23,524	Fitzgerald
27 March 2004	Wigan Athletic	H	1–1	13,382	Helguson
10 April 2004	Crewe Alexandra	H	2–1	18,041	Hyde, Wright (own goal)
12 April 2004	Burnley	A	3–2	11,413	Devlin, Helguson, Cook
17 April 2004	Rotherham United	A	1–1	7,221	Dyer
20 April 2004	Millwall	A	2–1	10,263	Dyer, Cook
24 April 2004	Norwich City	H	1–2	19,290	Blizzard
1 May 2004	West Ham United	A	0–4	34,685	
9 May 2004	Reading	H	1–0	17,979	Young

=== FA Cup ===
Round	Date	Opponent	Venue	Result	Attendance	Goalscorers
R3	3 January 2004	Chelsea	H	2–2	21,121	Helguson, Mahon
R3R	14 January 2004	Chelsea	A	0–4	38,763	

=== League Cup ===
Round	Date	Opponent	Venue	Result	Attendance	Goalscorers
R1	12 August 2003	Bournemouth	H	1–0	9,561	Fitzgerald
R2	23 September 2003	Bristol City	A	0–1	5,213	

== Players ==
=== First-team squad ===
Note: Flags indicate national team as defined under FIFA eligibility rules; some limited exceptions apply. Players may hold more than one non-FIFA nationality.

No.	Pos.	Nation	Player
1	GK	ENG	Alec Chamberlain
2	MF	ENG	Neal Ardley
3	DF	ENG	Paul Mayo
4	MF	ENG	Paolo Vernazza
5	DF	ENG	Neil Cox
6	DF	ENG	Sean Dyche
7	FW	ENG	Bruce Dyer (Note: Dyer was born in Redbridge, England, and represented England at U-21 level, but also qualified to represent Montserrat internationally and would make his international debut for Montserrat in September 2007.)
8	MF	JAM	Micah Hyde (Note: Hyde was born in Newham, England, but also qualified to represent Jamaica internationally and made his international debut for Jamaica in 2001.)
9	FW	ENG	Danny Webber
12	MF	ENG	Gavin Mahon
13	GK	ENG	Richard Lee
14	DF	ENG	Wayne Brown
15	DF	JAM	Marcus Gayle (Note: Gayle was born in Hammersmith, London, and represented them at U-18 level, but also qualified to represent Jamaica internationally through his father and made his international debut for Jamaica in 1998.)
16	MF	ENG	Anthony McNamee
17	MF	ENG	Jamie Hand

No.	Pos.	Nation	Player
18	FW	ISL	Heiðar Helguson
19	DF	ENG	Jerel Ifil
20	DF	ENG	Lloyd Doyley (Note: Doyley was born in Tower Hamlets, England, but also qualified to represent Jamaica internationally and would make his international debut for Jamaica in March 2013.)
21	FW	ENG	Scott Fitzgerald
22	MF	ENG	Lee Cook
23	MF	ENG	Gary Fisken
24	FW	TRI	Jason Norville
25	MF	SCO	Paul Devlin (Note: Devlin was born in Birmingham, England, but also qualified to represent Scotland internationally through his father and made his international debut for Scotland in October 2002.)
27	MF	ENG	Ashley Young
30	GK	ENG	Lenny Pidgeley (on loan from Chelsea)
31	GK	ENG	Kevin Hitchcock
33	MF	ENG	Dominic Blizzard
34	DF	ENG	Jack Smith
35	FW	FRA	Hameur Bouazza (Note: Bouazza was born in Évry, France, but also qualified to represent Algeria internationally through his parents and would make his international debut for Algeria in February 2007.)

=== Left club during season ===
Note: Flags indicate national team as defined under FIFA eligibility rules; some limited exceptions apply. Players may hold more than one non-FIFA nationality.

No.	Pos.	Nation	Player
3	DF	ENG	Paul Robinson (to West Bromwich Albion)
10	MF	AUS	Richard Johnson (to Colchester United)
10	DF	NIR	Chris Baird (on loan from Southampton)

No.	Pos.	Nation	Player
11	MF	ENG	Jimmy Davis (died)
32	DF	IRL	Stephen Kelly (on loan from Tottenham Hotspur)
