= 2001–02 Watford F.C. season =

English football team season

Watford
2001–02 season
- Chairman: Elton John
- Manager: Gianluca Vialli
- Stadium: Vicarage Road
- First Division: 14th
- FA Cup: Third round
- League Cup: Quarter finals
- Top goalscorer: Smith (11)
- Average home league attendance: 14,896

During the 2001–02 English football season, Watford competed in the Football League First Division.

== Season summary ==
In the 2001–02 season, Gianluca Vialli was named as Taylor's managerial replacement. Vialli made several high-profile signings, and wage bills at the club soared, with Vialli himself earning almost a million pounds a year. However, the season was disappointing, with the club finishing 14th in the division, and Vialli was sacked after only one season, having refused to resign.

== Final league table ==
Pos	Team	Pld	W	D	L	GF	GA	GD	Pts
12	Gillingham	46	18	10	18	64	67	−3	64
13	Sheffield United	46	15	15	16	53	54	−1	60
14	Watford	46	16	11	19	62	56	+6	59
15	Bradford City	46	15	10	21	69	76	−7	55
16	Nottingham Forest	46	12	18	16	50	51	−1	54

Rules for classification: 1) Points; 2) Goal difference; 3) Goals scored

== Results ==
Watford's score comes first

=== Legend ===
Win	Draw	Loss

=== Football League First Division ===
Date	Opponent	Venue	Result	Attendance	Scorers
11 August 2001	Manchester City	A	0–3	33,939	
18 August 2001	Rotherham United	H	3–2	13,839	Smith (2), Nielsen
25 August 2001	Wolverhampton Wanderers	A	0–1	20,257	
27 August 2001	Walsall	H	2–1	14,652	Galli, Nielsen
9 September 2001	Wimbledon	H	3–0	15,466	Wooter, Gayle, Robinson
15 September 2001	West Bromwich Albion	H	1–2	15,726	Gayle
18 September 2001	Norwich City	A	1–3	17,885	Vega
22 September 2001	Crewe Alexandra	A	0–1	6,507	
26 September 2001	Birmingham City	H	3–3	13,091	Smith, Cox, Glass
30 September 2001	Preston North End	H	1–1	18,911	Jackson (own goal)
13 October 2001	Sheffield Wednesday	H	3–1	14,456	Hyde, Noel-Williams, Helguson
20 October 2001	Grimsby Town	A	3–0	5,506	Hyde (2), Noble
23 October 2001	Nottingham Forest	H	1–2	16,355	Noel-Williams
27 October 2001	Bradford City	A	3–4	16,860	Helguson, Smith (2, 1 pen)
30 October 2001	Sheffield United	A	2–0	14,338	Helguson, Smith
3 November 2001	Barnsley	H	3–0	13,964	Smith, Helguson (2)
10 November 2001	Stockport County	H	1–1	12,576	Smith
13 November 2001	Burnley	A	0–1	13,162	
18 November 2001	Gillingham	A	0–0	8,733	
25 November 2001	Portsmouth	H	3–0	15,631	Robinson, Cox, Issa
1 December 2001	Nottingham Forest	A	0–0	24,015	
9 December 2001	Coventry City	A	2–0	13,251	Glass (2, 1 pen)
15 December 2001	Crystal Palace	H	1–0	16,499	Noel-Williams
22 December 2001	Wolverhampton Wanderers	H	1–1	17,389	Smith
29 December 2001	Walsall	A	3–0	6,882	Fisken, Nielsen, Smith
1 January 2002	Millwall	H	1–4	15,300	Helguson
12 January 2002	Rotherham United	A	1–1	6,409	Swailes (own goal)
15 January 2002	Millwall	A	0–1	12,531	
20 January 2002	Manchester City	H	1–2	17,074	Smith
31 January 2002	Preston North End	A	1–1	12,749	Noel-Williams
6 February 2002	Burnley	H	1–2	12,160	Pennant
10 February 2002	Grimsby Town	H	2–0	12,163	Robinson, Noel-Williams
16 February 2002	Sheffield Wednesday	A	1–2	18,244	Noel-Williams
19 February 2002	Wimbledon	A	0–0	5,551	
23 February 2002	Birmingham City	A	2–3	18,059	Pennant, Johnson (own goal)
26 February 2002	Norwich City	H	2–1	12,622	Hyde, Nielsen
2 March 2002	Crewe Alexandra	H	0–1	15,199	
5 March 2002	West Bromwich Albion	A	1–1	19,580	Brown
9 March 2002	Crystal Palace	A	2–0	16,817	Nielsen, Gayle
16 March 2002	Coventry City	H	3–0	15,833	Brown (2), Gayle
23 March 2002	Barnsley	A	0–2	12,449	
29 March 2002	Bradford City	H	0–0	14,001	
1 April 2002	Stockport County	A	1–2	4,086	Webber
6 April 2002	Sheffield United	H	0–3	13,377	
13 April 2002	Portsmouth	A	1–0	16,302	Webber
21 April 2002	Gillingham	H	2–3	15,674	McNamee, Nielsen

=== FA Cup ===
Round	Date	Opponent	Venue	Result	Attendance	Goalscorers
R3	5 January 2002	Arsenal	H	2–4	20,105	Noel-Williams, Gayle

=== League Cup ===
Round	Date	Opponent	Venue	Result	Attendance	Goalscorers
R1	21 August 2001	Plymouth Argyle	H	1–0	9,230	Gayle
R2	12 September 2001	Bristol City	A	3–2	7,256	Gayle (pen), Vega, Hyde
R3	9 October 2001	Bradford City	H	4–1	8,613	Hyde, Noel-Williams (2), Vega
R4	27 November 2001	Charlton Athletic	H	3–2 (a.e.t.)	12,621	Vernazza, Robinson, Helguson
QF	19 December 2001	Sheffield Wednesday	A	0–4	20,319	

== Players ==
=== First-team squad ===
Squad at end of season

Note: Flags indicate national team as defined under FIFA eligibility rules; some limited exceptions apply. Players may hold more than one non-FIFA nationality.

No.	Pos.	Nation	Player
1	GK	NOR	Espen Baardsen (Note: Baardsen was born in San Rafael, California, United States, and represented them at U-18 level, but also qualified to represent Norway internationally through his parents and made his international debut for Norway in September 1998.)
2	DF	FRA	Patrick Blondeau
3	DF	ENG	Paul Robinson
4	MF	ENG	Paolo Vernazza
5	DF	ITA	Filippo Galli
6	DF	SUI	Ramon Vega
7	MF	DEN	Allan Nielsen
8	MF	JAM	Micah Hyde (Note: Hyde was born in Newham, England, but also qualified to represent Jamaica internationally and made his international debut for Jamaica in 2001.)
9	FW	ENG	Tommy Smith
10	MF	ENG	Stephen Hughes
11	MF	SCO	Stephen Glass
12	FW	NED	Nordin Wooter (Note: Wooter was born in Paramaribo, Suriname, but also qualified to represent the Netherlands internationally and represented them at U-19 and U-21 level.)
13	GK	ENG	Alec Chamberlain
14	MF	AUS	Richard Johnson
15	FW	ENG	Gifton Noel-Williams
16	DF	ENG	Nigel Gibbs
17	MF	ENG	Nick Wright
18	FW	ISL	Heiðar Helguson
19	DF	ENG	James Panayi

No.	Pos.	Nation	Player
20	MF	ENG	David Noble (Note: Noble was born in Hitchin, England, but also qualified to represent Scotland internationally and would represent them at B level.) (on loan from Arsenal)
21	FW	IRL	Dominic Foley
22	MF	ENG	Lee Cook
24	MF	AUS	Paul Okon
25	MF	ENG	Gary Fisken
26	MF	ENG	Fabian Forde (Note: Forde was born in Harrow, England, but also qualified to represent Barbados internationally and would make his international debut for Barbados in November 2002.)
27	FW	JAM	Marcus Gayle (Note: Gayle was born in Hammersmith, London, and represented them at U-18 level, but also qualified to represent Jamaica internationally through his father and made his international debut for Jamaica in 1998.)
28	MF	RSA	Pierre Issa
29	DF	ENG	Neil Cox
30	MF	ENG	Danny Webber (on loan from Manchester United)
31	MF	ENG	Sam Swonnell
32	DF	ENG	Jerel Ifil
33	MF	ENG	Anthony McNamee
34	DF	ENG	Lloyd Doyley (Note: Doyley was born in Tower Hamlets, England, but also qualified to represent Jamaica internationally and would make his international debut for Jamaica in March 2013.)
35	FW	TRI	Jason Norville
36	MF	ENG	Jamie Hand
37	GK	ENG	Richard Lee
39	MF	ENG	Gavin Mahon
40	DF	ENG	Nick Williams

=== Left club during season ===
Note: Flags indicate national team as defined under FIFA eligibility rules; some limited exceptions apply. Players may hold more than one non-FIFA nationality.

No.	Pos.	Nation	Player
23	DF	ENG	Darren Ward (to Millwall)
23	MF	ENG	Jermaine Pennant (on loan from Arsenal)
24	DF	ENG	Tom Neill (released)
28	DF	WAL	Rob Page (to Sheffield United)
30	DF	ENG	Matthew Langston (released)

No.	Pos.	Nation	Player
30	DF	ENG	Wayne Brown (on loan from Ipswich Town)
31	FW	SCO	Allan Smart (to Oldham Athletic)
33	MF	ENG	David Perpetuini (to Gillingham)
35	DF	ENG	Barrie Matthews (released)
