= 2011–12 Wycombe Wanderers F.C. season =

Wycombe Wanderers
2011–12 season
- Chairman: Ivor Beeks
- Manager: Gary Waddock
- League One: 21st (Relegated)
- FA Cup: First Round
- League Cup: Second Round
- FL Trophy: Second Round
- Top goalscorer: League: Stuart Beavon (21); All: Stuart Beavon (25)
- Highest home attendance: 7,097 vs. Walsall, 8 October 2011
- Lowest home attendance: 771 vs. Bristol Rovers, 6 September 2011

The 2011–12 Football League One was Wycombe Wanderers' 124th season in existence and their eighteenth season in the Football League. This page shows statistics of the club's players of that season, and also lists all matches that the club played during the season.

Wycombe were relegated back to League Two, after losing to Notts County on 28 April 2012.

== League table ==
Pos	Team	Pld	W	D	L	GF	GA	GD	Pts	Promotion, qualification or relegation
19	Walsall	46	10	20	16	51	57	−6	50	
20	Leyton Orient	46	13	11	22	48	75	−27	50	
21	Wycombe Wanderers (R)	46	11	10	25	65	88	−23	43	Relegation to Football League Two
22	Chesterfield (R)	46	10	12	24	56	81	−25	42	Relegation to Football League Two
23	Exeter City (R)	46	10	12	24	46	75	−29	42	Relegation to Football League Two

Updated to match(es) played on 5 May 2012. Source: BBC Sport
Rules for classification: 1) Points; 2) Goal difference; 3) Number of goals scored
(R) Relegated

== Match results ==
=== Legend ===
Win	Draw	Loss

=== Friendlies ===
Game	Date	Opponent	Venue	Result	Attendance	Goalscorers	Ref.
1	9 July 2011	Staines Town	Wheatsheaf Park	5–0	318	Beavon 13', Kewley-Graham 28', McClure 35', 45', Ibe 65'	
2	12 July 2011	Chelsea	Cobham Training Centre	0–3	Behind closed doors		
3	16 July 2011	Braintree Town	Cressing Road	1–2		Ainsworth 56'	
4	19 July 2011	Crystal Palace	Adams Park	0–0	1,426		
5	23 July 2011	West Ham	Adams Park	0–0	4,352		
6	26 July 2011	Wealdstone	St Georges Stadium	1–1		Bloomfield 16'	
7	30 July 2011	Northampton Town	Sixfields Stadium	1–2	1,044	Ainsworth 18'	

=== Football League One ===
Game	Date	Opponent	Venue	Result	Attendance	Goalscorers	Ref.
1	6 August 2011	Scunthorpe Utd	Adams Park	1–1	4,451	Tunnicliffe 23'	
2	13 August 2011	Colchester Utd	Colchester Community Stadium	1–1	3,902	Rendell 61'(p)	
3	16 August 2011	Leyton Orient	Brisbane Road	3–1	3,503	Strevens 8', Donnelly 18'(p), Grant 50'	
4	20 August 2011	Bury	Adams Park	0–2	3,259		
5	27 August 2011	Huddersfield	Galpharm Stadium	0–3	11,953		
6	10 September 2011	Brentford	Adams Park	0–1	5,045		
7	13 September 2011	Yeovil Town	Huish Park	0–1	3,134		
8	17 September 2011	Tranmere Rovers	Prenton Park	0–2	4,297		
9	24 September 2011	Sheffield Utd	Adams Park	1–0	5,506	Beavon 31'	
10	27 September 2011	Preston NE	Adams Park	3–4	3,734	Ainsworth 12', Donnelly 14'(p), Beavon 27'	
11	1 October 2011	Rochdale	Spotland Stadium	1–2	2,266	Donnelly 6'	
12	8 October 2011	Walsall	Adams Park	1–1	7,097	Strevens 49'	
13	15 October 2011	Hartlepool	Victoria Park	3–1	5,421	Donnelly 15', Beavon 36', Collins 82'(og)	
14	22 October 2011	Oldham Athletic	Boundary Park	0–2	3,592		
15	25 October 2011	Charlton Athletic	Adams Park	1–2	5,406	Beavon 63'	
16	29 October 2011	Sheffield Wednesday	Adams Park	1–2	6,448	Ibe 29'	
17	5 November 2011	Notts County	Meadow Lane	1–1	7,664	Grant 90+2'	
18	19 November 2011	Bournemouth	Adams Park	0–1	5,350		
19	26 November 2011	MK Dons	Stadium mk	3–4	9,701	Beavon 51', 90', Trotta 52'	
20	10 December 2011	Chesterfield	Adams Park	3–2	4,320	McNamee 31', Trotta 79', Beavon 90+4'	
21	17 December 2011	Carlisle	Brunton Park	2–2	4,414	McNamee 28', Trotta 36'	
22	26 December 2011	Exeter	Adams Park	3–1	4,904	Trotta 1', 40' 88'	
23	31 December 2011	Stevenage	Adams Park	0–1	4,942		
24	2 January 2012	Bournemouth	Seward Stadium	0–2	7,202		
25	6 January 2012	Huddersfield	Adams Park	0–6	4,465		
26	14 January 2012	Preston NE	Deepdale	2–3	10,142	Trotta 8', 89'	
27	21 January 2012	Rochdale	Adams Park	3–0	4,285	Beavon 32', 73', Winfield 75'	
28	28 January 2012	Brentford	Griffin Park	2–5	5,560	Winfield 47', Strevens 76'	
29	4 February 2012	Tranmere	Adams Park	2–1	4,398	Whichelow 23', Ainsworth 30'	
30	11 February 2012	Sheffield Utd	Bramall Lane	0–3	17,165		
31	14 February 2012	Yeovil Town	Adams Park	2–3	3,529	Beavon 15', Grant 79'	
32	18 February 2012	Walsall	Bescot Stadium	0–2	3,491		
33	25 February 2012	Hartlepool	Adams Park	5–0	4,408	Hayes 5', 55', Doherty 11', Beavon 42', 71'	
34	3 March 2012	Scunthorpe Utd	Glanford Park	1–4	3,811	McClure 86'	
35	6 March 2012	Leyton Orient	Adams Park	4–2	3,564	Beavon 7', Hayes 26', Bloomfield 33', Strevens 39'	
36	10 March 2012	Colchester Utd	Adams Park	0–0	4,838		
37	17 March 2012	Bury	Gigg Lane	4–1	2,479	Beavon 4', 61', 70', Hayes 12'	
38	20 March 2012	Exeter	St James Park	3–1	4,121	Hayes 58', 70', Beavon 63'	
39	24 March 2012	MK Dons	Adams Park	1–1	5,572	Beavon 90'	
40	31 March 2012	Stevenage	Broadhall Way	1–1	3,593	Basey 90+4'(p)	
41	6 April 2012	Carlisle	Adams Park	1–1	4,823	Lewis 90+1'	
42	9 April 2012	Chesterfield	B2net Stadium	0–4	5,087		
43	14 April 2012	Oldham Athletic	Adams Park	2–2	5,109	Beavon 34', Grant 78'	
44	21 April 2012	Charlton Athletic	The Valley	1–2	18,539	Beavon 45'	
45	28 April 2012	Notts County	Adams Park	3–4	5,947	Bloomfield 1', Basey 17'(p), Beavon 68'	
46	5 May 2012	Sheffield Wednesday	Hillsborough	0–2	38,082		

=== FA Cup ===
Round	Date	Opponent	Venue	Result	Attendance	Goalscorers	Ref.
1	12 November 2011	Fleetwood Town	Highbury Stadium	0–2	2,711		

=== League Cup ===
Round	Date	Opponent	Venue	Result	Attendance	Goalscorers	Ref.
1	9 August 2011	Colchester Utd	Adams Park	3–3 (a.e.t.); 5–4 pens.	1,430	Donnelly 2', Grant 12', Beavon 105'	
2	23 August 2011	Nottingham Forest	Adams Park	1–4	2,866	Benyon 66' (pen)	

=== Football League Trophy ===
Round	Date	Opponent	Venue	Result	Attendance	Goalscorers	Ref.
1	6 September 2011	Bristol Rovers	Adams Park	3–1	771	Beavon 9', 57', 76'	
2	4 October 2011	Cheltenham Town	Adams Park	1–3	931	Betsy 62'	

== Squad statistics ==
=== Appearances and goals ===
As of 5 May 2012

No.	Pos	Nat	Player	Total		League One		FA Cup		League Cup		FL Trophy	
No.	Pos	Nat	Player	Apps	Goals	Apps	Goals	Apps	Goals	Apps	Goals	Apps	Goals
1	GK	(England) ENG	Nikki Bull	51	0	46	0	1	0	2	0	2	0
2	DF	(England) ENG	Danny Foster	32	0	29	0	1	0	1	0	1	0
3	DF	(England) ENG	Louis Laing	11	0	11	0	0	0	0	0	0	0
4	MF	(England) ENG	Craig Eastmond	14	0	14	0	0	0	0	0	0	0
5	DF	(England) ENG	Dave Winfield	28	2	25	2	1	0	2	0	0	0
6	DF	(England) ENG	Leon Johnson	31	0	26	0	1	0	2	0	2	0
7	MF	(England) ENG	Gareth Ainsworth	32	2	32	2	0	0	0	0	0	0
10	MF	(England) ENG	Matt Bloomfield	34	2	31	2	0	0	1	0	2	0
11	MF	(England) ENG	James Harper	3	0	3	0	0	0	0	0	0	0
12	FW	(England) ENG	Ben Strevens	36	4	34	4	1	0	0	0	1	0
13	GK	(England) ENG	Matt Ingram	0	0	0	0	0	0	0	0	0	0
15	DF	(Wales) WAL	Grant Basey	33	2	32	2	1	0	0	0	0	0
16	DF	(England) ENG	James Tunnicliffe	21	1	18	1	0	0	1	0	2	0
17	FW	(Jamaica) JAM	Joel Grant	33	5	30	4	1	0	2	1	0	0
18	MF	(England) ENG	Stuart Lewis	45	0	41	0	1	0	1	0	2	0
19	DF	(Antigua and Barbuda) ANT	Marvin McCoy	32	0	28	0	0	0	2	0	2	0
20	FW	(England) ENG	Stuart Beavon	45	25	43	21	0	0	1	1	1	3
21	MF	(England) ENG	John Halls	8	0	7	0	0	0	1	0	0	0
22	MF	(England) ENG	Scott Donnelly	21	5	18	4	1	0	1	1	1	0
23	MF	(England) ENG	Paul Hayes	6	6	6	6	0	0	0	0	0	0
24	MF	(England) ENG	Matthew Whichelow	4	1	4	1	0	0	0	0	0	0
25	MF	(England) ENG	Chris Hackett	7	0	7	0	0	0	0	0	0	0
26	MF	(England) ENG	Jess Kewley-Graham	1	0	1	0	0	0	0	0	0	0
27	DF	(England) ENG	Anthony Stewart	3	0	3	0	0	0	0	0	0	0
28	MF	(England) ENG	Josh Scowen	0	0	0	0	0	0	0	0	0	0
29	FW	(Northern Ireland) NIR	Matt McClure	12	1	12	1	0	0	0	0	0	0
30	DF	(Ireland) EIR	Gary Doherty	13	1	13	1	0	0	0	0	0	0
31	DF	(England) ENG	Charles Dunne	3	0	3	0	0	0	0	0	0	0
34	MF	(England) ENG	Anthony McNamee	14	2	14	2	0	0	0	0	0	0

=== Top scorers ===
Goals	Name	League One	FA Cup	League Cup	FL Trophy	Total
25	Stuart Beavon	21	0	1	3	25
8	Marcello Trotta *	8	0	0	0	8
6	Paul Hayes	6	0	0	0	6
5	Scott Donnelly	4	0	1	0	5
=	Joel Grant	4	0	1	0	5
4	Ben Strevens	4	0	0	0	4
2	Gareth Ainsworth	2	0	0	0	2
=	Grant Basey	2	0	0	0	2
=	Matt Bloomfield	2	0	0	0	2
=	Matt McClure	2	0	0	0	2
=	Anthony McNamee	2	0	0	0	2
=	Dave Winfield	2	0	0	0	2
1	Elliot Benyon	0	0	1	0	1
=	Kevin Betsy *	0	0	0	1	1
=	Gary Doherty	1	0	0	0	1
=	Jordon Ibe *	1	0	0	0	1
=	Scott Rendell	1	0	0	0	1
=	James Tunnicliffe	1	0	0	0	1
=	Matthew Whichelow	1	0	0	0	1
TOTALS		64	0	4	4	72

*Trotta, Betsy and Ibe left the club before the end of the season

=== Disciplinary record ===
Number	Nation	Position	Name	League One		FA Cup		League Cup		FL Trophy		Total	
Number	Nation	Position	Name	Yellow card	Red card	Yellow card	Red card	Yellow card	Red card	Yellow card	Red card	Yellow card	Red card
1	(England)	GK	Nikki Bull	0	0	0	0	1	0	0	0	1	0
3	(England)	DF	Louis Laing	1	0	0	0	0	0	0	0	1	0
4	(England)	DF	Craig Eastmond	6	0	0	0	0	0	0	0	6	0
5	(England)	DF	Dave Winfield	9	0	1	0	0	0	0	0	10	0
6	(England)	DF	Leon Johnson	10	0	0	0	0	0	0	0	10	0
7	(England)	MF	Gareth Ainsworth	2	1	0	0	0	0	0	0	2	1
10	(England)	FW	Matt Bloomfield	6	0	0	0	0	0	0	0	6	0
11	(England)	MF	Steve Harper	1	0	0	0	0	0	0	0	1	0
12	(England)	FW	Ben Strevens	5	1	0	0	0	0	0	0	5	1
15	(Wales)	DF	Grant Basey	2	0	0	0	0	0	0	0	2	0
16	(England)	DF	James Tunnicliffe	2	0	0	0	0	0	0	0	2	0
17	(Jamaica)	FW	Joel Grant	1	0	0	0	0	0	0	0	1	0
18	(England)	MF	Stuart Lewis	10	0	0	0	0	0	0	0	10	0
19	(Antigua and Barbuda)	DF	Marvin McCoy	4	0	0	0	1	0	0	0	4	0
20	(England)	FW	Stuart Beavon	2	0	0	0	1	0	0	0	3	0
21	(England)	MF	John Halls	3	0	0	0	0	0	0	0	3	0
22	(England)	MF	Scott Donnelly	2	0	0	0	0	0	0	0	2	0
23	(England)	FW	Elliot Benyon	1	0	0	0	0	0	0	0	1	0
25	(England)	MF	Chris Hackett	1	0	0	0	0	0	0	0	1	0
27	(England)	DF	Anthony Stewart	1	0	0	0	0	0	0	0	1	0
30	(Republic of Ireland)	DF	Gary Doherty	1	0	0	0	0	0	0	0	1	0
TOTALS				70	2	1	0	3	0	0	0	74	2

== Transfers ==
Players transferred in
Date	Pos.	Name	From	Fee	Ref.
23 May 2011	MF	(England) Ben Harding	(England) Aldershot Town	Free Transfer	
27 May 2011	FW	(Jamaica) Joel Grant	(England) Crewe	Free Transfer	
22 June 2011	DF	(England) James Tunnicliffe	(England) Brighton & Hove Albion	Free Transfer	
1 July 2011	DF	(England) John Halls	(England) Aldershot Town	Free Transfer	
27 August 2011	GK	(England) Jason Mooney	(England) Oxford City	Free Transfer	
1 February 2012	MF	(England) Anthony McNamee	(England) MK Dons	Free Transfer	
Players transferred out
Date	Pos.	Name	To	Fee	Ref.
19 May 2011	FW	(England) Jon-Paul Pittman	(England) Oxford United	Free Transfer	
10 June 2011	MF	(Antigua and Barbuda) Keiran Murtagh	(England) Cambridge United	Free Transfer	
1 July 2011	DF	(England) Chris Westwood	(England) Wrexham	Free Transfer	
1 July 2011	MF	(England) Lewis Montrose	(England) Gillingham	Free Transfer	
4 July 2011	DF	(Republic of Ireland) Alan Bennett	(England) Cheltenham Town	Free Transfer	
7 November 2011	DF	(England) Andy Sandell	(England) Chippenham Town	Free Transfer	
20 December 2011	MF	(England) Kevin Betsy	(England) Woking	Free Transfer	
20 December 2011	FW	(England) Jordon Ibe	(England) Liverpool	£500,000	
30 January 2011	MF	(England) Kadeem Harris	(England) Cardiff City	Free Transfer	
1 February 2011	MF	(England) Ben Harding	(England) Northampton Town	Free Transfer	
Players loaned in
Date from	Pos.	Name	From	Date to	Ref.
13 June 2011	MF	(England) Scott Donnelly	(Wales) Swansea City	31 May 2012	
20 June 2011	FW	(England) Elliot Benyon	(England) Swindon Town	31 May 2012	
27 September 2011	MF	(Republic of Ireland) Martin Rowlands	(England) Queens Park Rangers	27 October 2011	
25 October 2011	MF	(England) Nicholas Bignall	(England) Reading	25 November 2011	
25 November 2011	FW	(England) Marcello Trotta	(England) Fulham	20 January 2012	
25 November 2011	MF	(England) Anthony McNamee	(England) MK Dons	7 January 2012	
16 January 2012	MF	(England) Louis Laing	(England) Sunderland	16 February 2012	
24 January 2012	MF	(England) James Harper	(England) Hull City	24 February 2012	
31 January 2012	FW	(England) Matthew Whichelow	(England) Watford	31 February 2012	
21 February 2012	MF	(England) Chris Hackett	(England) Millwall	21 March 2012	
24 February 2012	FW	(England) Paul Hayes	(England) Charlton Athletic	31 May 2012	
24 February 2012	DF	(England) Gary Doherty	(England) Charlton Athletic	31 May 2012	
Players loaned out
Date from	Pos.	Name	To	Date to	Ref.
5 August 2011	GK	(England) Steve Arnold	(England) Hayes & Yeading	5 September 2011	
12 August 2011	GK	(Northern Ireland) Matt McClure	(England) Hayes & Yeading	12 September 2011	
7 October 2011	FW	(England) Scott Rendell	(England) Bristol Rovers	7 November 2011	
15 October 2011	DF	(England) Charles Dunne	(England) Staines Town	31 May 2012	
31 January 2012	FW	(England) Scott Rendell	(England) Oxford Utd	31 May 2012	

== See also ==
- 2011–12 in English football
- 2011–12 Football League One
- Wycombe Wanderers F.C.
- Gary Waddock
