= Jamie Hand =

English footballer (born 1984)

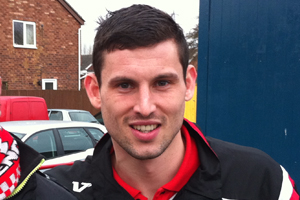
- Hand in 2011

Personal information
- Full name: Jamie Hand
- Date of birth: 7 February 1984 (age 42)
- Place of birth: Uxbridge, England
- Height: 5 ft 11 in (1.80 m)
- Position: Midfielder

Youth career
- ?–2001: Watford

Senior career*
Years	Team	Apps	(Gls)
2001–2006	Watford	55	(0)
2004	→ Oxford United (loan)	11	(1)
2005	→ Livingston (loan)	7	(0)
2005	→ Peterborough United (loan)	9	(0)
2006	Fisher Athletic	0	(0)
2006	→ Northampton Town (loan)	11	(0)
2006–2007	Chester City	43	(2)
2007–2008	Lincoln City	25	(0)
2008	→ Oxford United (loan)	13	(0)
2008–2009	Ebbsfleet United	23	(0)
2009	Chelmsford City	17	(2)
2009–2010	Woking	12	(0)
2010	Hemel Hempstead Town		
2010–2012	Hayes & Yeading United	66	(4)
2011	→ Luton Town (loan)	13	(2)
2012–2013	Mansfield Town	9	(0)
2012	→ Eastleigh (loan)	2	(0)
2012–2013	→ Hayes & Yeading United (loan)	5	(1)
2013	→ Margate (loan)	10	(1)
2013–2014	Stockport County	5	(0)
2013–2014	→ Southport (loan)	1	(0)
2014–2015	Farnborough	16	(0)
2017	Warrington Town	0	(0)
Total		353	(13)

International career
- England U19

Managerial career
- 2015: Northwood (caretaker)
- * Club domestic league appearances and goals

Jamie Hand (born 7 February 1984) is an English former professional footballer and scout. A "tough-tackling, no-nonsense" midfielder, he made around 400 appearances in a 14-year football career and played in the English Football League (First Division and League Two), Scottish Premier League, Isthmian League, Conference (Premier, North and South), Southern League and Northern Premier League.

He began his career at Watford, making his first-team debut in January 2002 and winning the club's Young Player of the Year award in 2002–03. However, he dropped out of the first team in the 2004–05 season and had brief loan spells at Oxford United, Livingston and Peterborough United, before he joined Fisher Athletic in February 2006 to facilitate a loan move to Northampton Town, who he helped to win promotion out of League Two in 2005–06. He joined Chester City in May 2006 before he moved on to Lincoln City in August 2007. He returned to Oxford United before his contract was cancelled by mutual consent in May 2008.

After leaving Lincoln, he embarked on an extensive career in non-League football, firstly joining Ebbsfleet United in August 2008. He then played for Chelmsford City and Woking before signing with Hayes & Yeading United in August 2010, who he would later captain. He joined Luton Town on loan in September 2011 but was fined The Football Association in April 2012 after insulting Luton fans on Twitter. He quit Hayes over a row about club fines the following month. He signed with Mansfield Town in July 2012, who in turn loaned him out to Eastleigh, Hayes & Yeading United and Margate. He joined Stockport County in July 2013 and then had a loan spell at Southport. He signed with Farnborough in December 2014 and later had brief spells in caretaker charge at Northwood and playing at Warrington Town before he became a scout.

== Playing career ==
=== Watford ===
Born in Uxbridge, London, Hand started his career at Watford. He made his first-team debut for the "Hornets" on 5 January 2002, coming on as an 89th-minute substitute for Paolo Vernazza in a 4–2 defeat to Arsenal at Vicarage Road. He got his first start in the First Division on 31 January, in a 1–1 draw at Preston North End. He played a total of 11 games in the second half of the 2001–02 season, though was sometimes played out of position by manager Gianluca Vialli.

Despite an over-abundance of central midfielders for manager Ray Lewington to choose from at the club, Hand featured 25 times throughout the 2002–03 season, picking up nine bookings as well as the club's Young Player of the Year award. He again made 25 appearances throughout the 2003–04 campaign, though injuries helped to ensure that he slipped down the first-team pecking order behind players such as Gavin Mahon, and he disappeared from matchday squads entirely under new boss Aidy Boothroyd. He later commented that: "Lewington always wanted more experience in his midfield. He would play me for two or three games and then leave me out because I was young, but I think it did me more harm than good."

On 26 August 2004, he joined League Two club Oxford United on an initial one-month loan to help provide "U's" manager Graham Rix with cover for several injuries. He scored his first goal in the English Football League on 18 September. However, this was the consolation goal from a heavy 6–1 defeat at Yeovil Town. His loan spell at the Kassam Stadium was ended after two months. During that time, he had scored two goals from 11 appearances. On 5 January 2005, he joined Scottish Premier League side Livingston on loan until the end of the 2004–05 season. He played nine games for Richard Gough's "Lions" in the second half of the season.

On 23 September 2005, Hand joined Peterborough United on a one-month loan; "Posh" manager Mark Wright said that "he is a good acquisition - they have done us a great favour by letting him come here." He made ten appearances at the London Road Stadium, scoring one goal.

=== Fisher Athletic and Northampton Town ===
Hand departed Watford after the closure of the January 2006 transfer window, joining Fisher Athletic who were not bound by the regulations of the transfer window. Without making an appearance for the club, he joined Northampton Town on loan for the remainder of the 2005–06 season on 15 February. Fisher were managed by Justin Edinburgh, a former teammate of Northampton's then boss Colin Calderwood, leading to speculation that the Fisher move had been used to exploit a loophole in the transfer window system. Hand helped the "Cobblers" to secure runners-up spot in League Two and thereby win promotion from League One. However, he was not offered a contract at Sixfields and instead became a free agent.

=== Chester City ===
On 15 May 2006, Hand joined League Two side Chester City. He was signed by Mark Wright, his former Peterborough manager. He scored four goals from 50 appearances across the 2006–07 season. He started the following campaign at the Deva Stadium, but surprised "Seals" manager Bobby Williamson with the haste of his exit after the club accepted an offer from Lincoln City.

=== Lincoln City ===
Hand signed a two-year contract with Lincoln City on 17 August 2007. Lincoln's Director of Football, John Deehan, had previously worked with Hand at Northampton Town. He became a regular presence in the side under the management of John Schofield. Still, he lost his place when the "Imps" came under the management of Peter Jackson. On 28 February 2008, Hand was loaned out to former club Oxford United – now in the Conference and managed by Darren Patterson – until the end of the 2007–08 season. Despite starting 13 of Oxford's remaining 14 fixtures, the club announced that Hand would not be offered a deal for the following season. He returned to Sincil Bank. Hand's contract with Lincoln was cancelled by mutual consent in May 2008.

=== Non-League ===
In August 2008, Hand joined Conference side Ebbsfleet United on non-contract terms after spending time with them in pre-season. He made 26 appearances across the 2008–09 season, before dropping down to the Conference South to play for Chelmsford City. He returned to the Conference Premier in September 2009 to sign for Woking. In March 2010, he signed for Southern League Premier Division club Hemel Hempstead Town, arriving at the same time as former Watford teammate Paolo Vernazza.

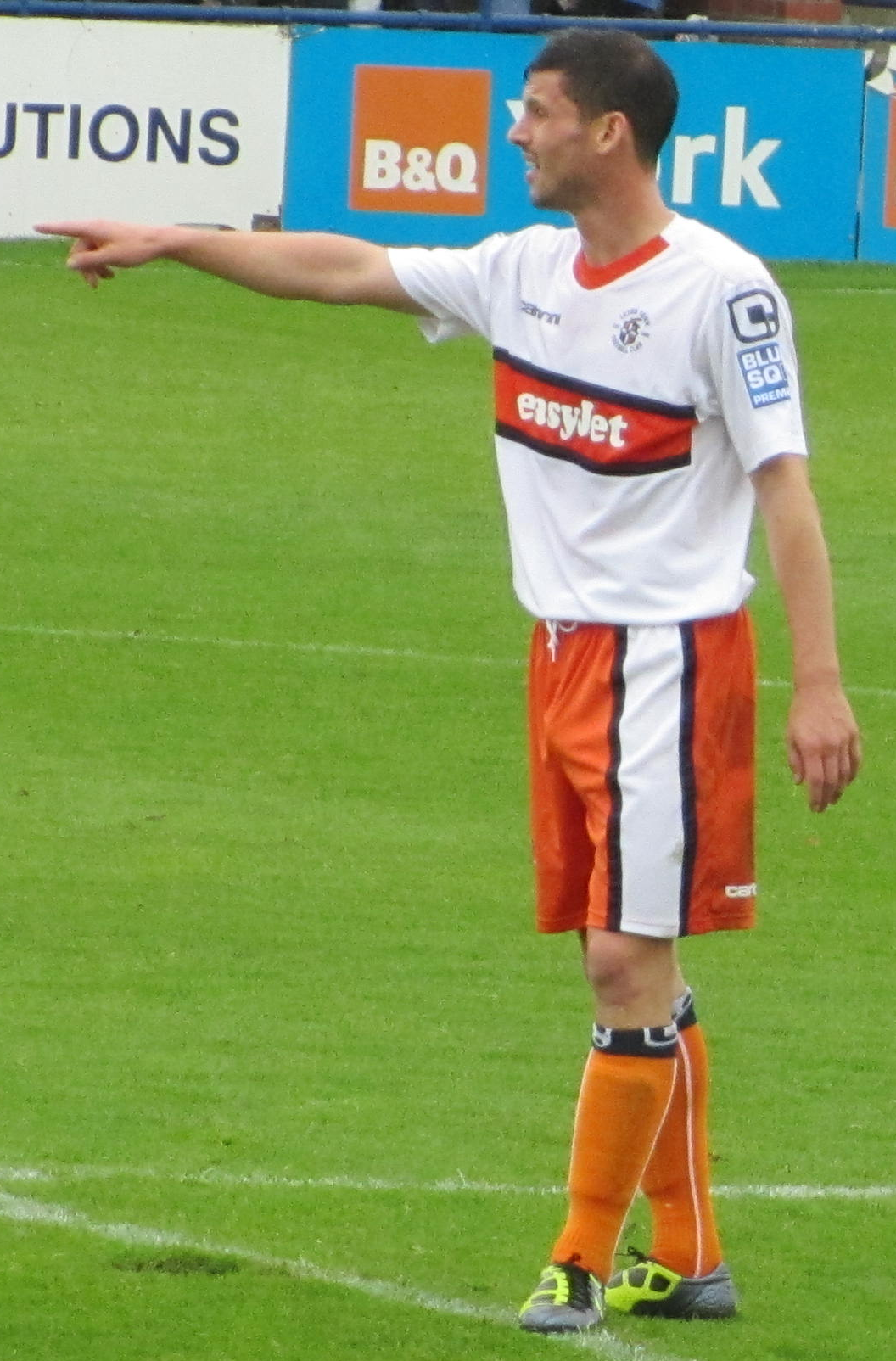
Hand playing for Luton Town in 2011

Hand returned to the Conference Premier after joining Hayes & Yeading United on a short-term deal in August 2010. He formed an effective midfield partnership with Peter Holmes and Bradley Pritchard, and was rewarded with an extended contract by manager Garry Haylock. Hand said: "I have been working hard and putting a lot of effort into my football – it is something I should have done years ago." He made 43 appearances in the 2010–11 season, scoring two goals, and was made club captain in the summer. On 9 September 2011, he moved on loan to divisional rivals Luton Town, with a view to a permanent move in January 2012. At the end of his loan spell with Luton Town, manager Gary Brabin decided not to pursue a transfer, explaining his thinking behind the decision he said: "Jamie was a fantastic character but hadn't nailed down a place in the squad that was his own, so it makes sense not to pursue it."

In April 2012, he was fined £250 by The Football Association for bringing the game into disrepute with comments he made on Twitter, such as one post on 9 April that Luton Town supporters were "40 year old virgins who live wit there [sic] mums". He quit Hayes the following month as he was unhappy with the level of a fine issued to him for a red card he received in the match at Lincoln City that saw Hayes relegated into the Conference South; he said "I don't think a sending off warrants a week's wages" and that Tony [O'Driscoll, director of football] and Nas Bashir are telling me it's the chairman's decision to fine me. If that's his decision that's fine but I won't play for the club again while he is in charge".

On 15 July 2012, Hand signed with Mansfield Town; "Stags" manager Paul Cox said that he "will add steel and competitiveness to the squad". On 9 November, he joined Richard Hill's Eastleigh on a one-month loan deal, in order to regain match fitness following a knee injury. On 2 January, he made a surprise return on loan at former club Hayes & Yeading United. Speaking about reversing his decision never to play for the club again, he said "we live in the here and now and that's all that matters". He made five appearances and was sent off on Bashir's final match in charge, a 6–2 defeat at Chelmsford City, which also proved to be Hand's last game for United. On 9 March, he joined Margate of the Isthmian League Premier Division on loan until the end of the 2012–13 season.

On 10 July 2013, Hand signed with Conference North side Stockport County. Manager Ian Bogie said that "he's at a good age, he's a good passer and will put his foot in as well". However, after being restricted to five appearances in three months at Edgeley Park, he joined Southport on a six-week loan deal starting on 25 November. Having played just twice for the "Sandgrounders" and five times for Stockport during the 2013–14 season, he was released by the "Hatters" in May 2014. He joined Conference South side Wealdstone on a trial basis in October 2014, playing in a friendly match against Metropolitan Police, but no permanent deal materialised. He signed for Farnborough in December 2014. He featured in 17 matches for the "Yellows" throughout the 2014–15 campaign. Hand signed with Northern Premier League Premier Division club Warrington Town in January 2017. However, he did not play a first-team game for the club.

== Style of play ==
Hand was described by Peterborough United and Chester City manager Mark Wright as a "tough-tackling, no-nonsense central midfielder who's six foot and mobile".

== Coaching career ==
In the absence of manager Mark Burgess and assistant Simon Huggett, Hand and Max Howell oversaw Northwood's 2–1 FA Cup Preliminary Round win at Aylesbury United on 29 August 2015. He went on to work at the club as a first-team coach. In October 2017, he was recruited by Port Vale manager Neil Aspin to act as the club's scout in the South of England.

== Career statistics ==
Appearances and goals by club, season and competition
Club	Season	League			FA Cup		League Cup		Other		Total	
Club	Season	Division	Apps	Goals	Apps	Goals	Apps	Goals	Apps	Goals	Apps	Goals
Watford	2001–02	First Division	10	0	1	0	0	0	—		11	0
Watford	2002–03	First Division	23	0	1	0	1	0	—		25	0
Watford	2003–04	First Division	22	0	1	0	2	0	—		25	0
Watford	2004–05	Championship	0	0	0	0	0	0	—		0	0
Watford	2005–06	Championship	0	0	0	0	0	0	0	0	0	0
Watford	Total		55	0	3	0	3	0	0	0	61	0
Oxford United (loan)	2004–05	League Two	11	1	0	0	0	0	1 (Note: Appearance(s) in the Football League Trophy)	1	12	2
Livingston (loan)	2004–05	Scottish Premier League	7	0	2	0	—		—		9	0
Peterborough United (loan)	2005–06	League Two	9	0	0	0	0	0	1	1	10	1
Fisher Athletic	2005–06	Isthmian League; Premier Division	0	0	0	0	—		0	0	0	0
Northampton Town (loan)	2005–06	League Two	11	0	—		—		—		11	0
Chester City	2006–07	League Two	43	2	5	1	1	0	1	1	50	4
Chester City	2007–08	League Two	0	0	0	0	1	0	0	0	1	0
Chester City	Total		43	2	5	1	2	0	1	1	51	4
Lincoln City	2007–08	League Two	25	0	0	0	0	0	1	0	26	0
Oxford United (loan)	2007–08	Conference Premier	13	0	0	0	—		0	0	13	0
Ebbsfleet United	2008–09	Conference Premier	23	0	1	0	—		1 (Note: Appearance(s) in the FA Trophy)	0	25	0
Chelmsford City	2008–09	Conference South	10	1	0	0	—		0	0	10	1
Chelmsford City	2009–10	Conference South	7	1	0	0	—		0	0	7	1
Chelmsford City	Total		17	2	0	0	0	0	0	0	17	2
Woking	2009–10	Conference South	12	0	5	0	—		2 (Note: 1 appearance in the FA Trophy and 1 appearance in the Surrey Senior Cup)	0	19	0
Hayes & Yeading United	2010–11	Conference Premier	40	2	2	0	—		1	0	43	2
Hayes & Yeading United	2011–12	Conference Premier	26	2	1	0	—		0	0	27	2
Hayes & Yeading United	Total		66	4	3	0	0	0	1	0	70	4
Luton Town (loan)	2011–12	Conference Premier	13	2	2	0	—		0	0	15	2
Mansfield Town	2012–13	Conference Premier	9	0	0	0	—		0	0	9	0
Eastleigh (loan)	2012–13	Conference South	2	0	0	0	—		1	0	3	0
Hayes & Yeading United (loan)	2012–13	Conference South	5	1	0	0	—		0	0	5	1
Margate (loan)	2012–13	Isthmian League; Premier Division	10	1	0	0	—		0	0	10	1
Stockport County	2013–14	Conference North	5	0	0	0	—		0	0	5	0
Southport (loan)	2013–14	Conference Premier	1	0	0	0	—		1	0	2	0
Farnborough	2014–15	Conference South	16	0	0	0	—		3 (Note: 1 appearance in the FA Trophy and 2 appearances in the Hampshire Senior Cup)	0	19	0
Career total (Note: Statistics for Hemel Hempstead Town and Warrington Town not known)			353	13	21	1	5	0	13	3	392	17

== Honours ==
Northampton Town

- League Two second-place promotion: 2005–06
