= 2004 FA Summer Tournament =

Tournament details
- Host country: England
- Dates: 30 May – 5 June 2004
- Teams: 3 (from two confederations)
- Venue: 1

Final positions
- Champions: England
- Runners-up: Japan
- Third place: Iceland

Tournament statistics
- Matches played: 3
- Goals scored: 14 (4.67 per match)
- Attendance: 85,166 (28,389 per match)
- Top scorer(s): (Iceland) Heiðar Helguson (three goals)

The 2004 FA Summer Tournament was a minor international football competition that took place in England from 30 May to 5 June 2004. Host nation England, Japan and Iceland participated in the tournament. All matches took place at the City of Manchester Stadium, home of Manchester City.

This three-nation mini-tournament was arranged as a preparatory exercise for England just before UEFA Euro 2004 began the following week. It featured England’s squad for that tournament, which had been named two weeks before on 17 May 2004. They won the tournament on goal difference from Japan, having been held to a draw by them but defeating Iceland via a greater margin.

== Venue ==
Manchester
City of Manchester Stadium
Capacity: 47,000
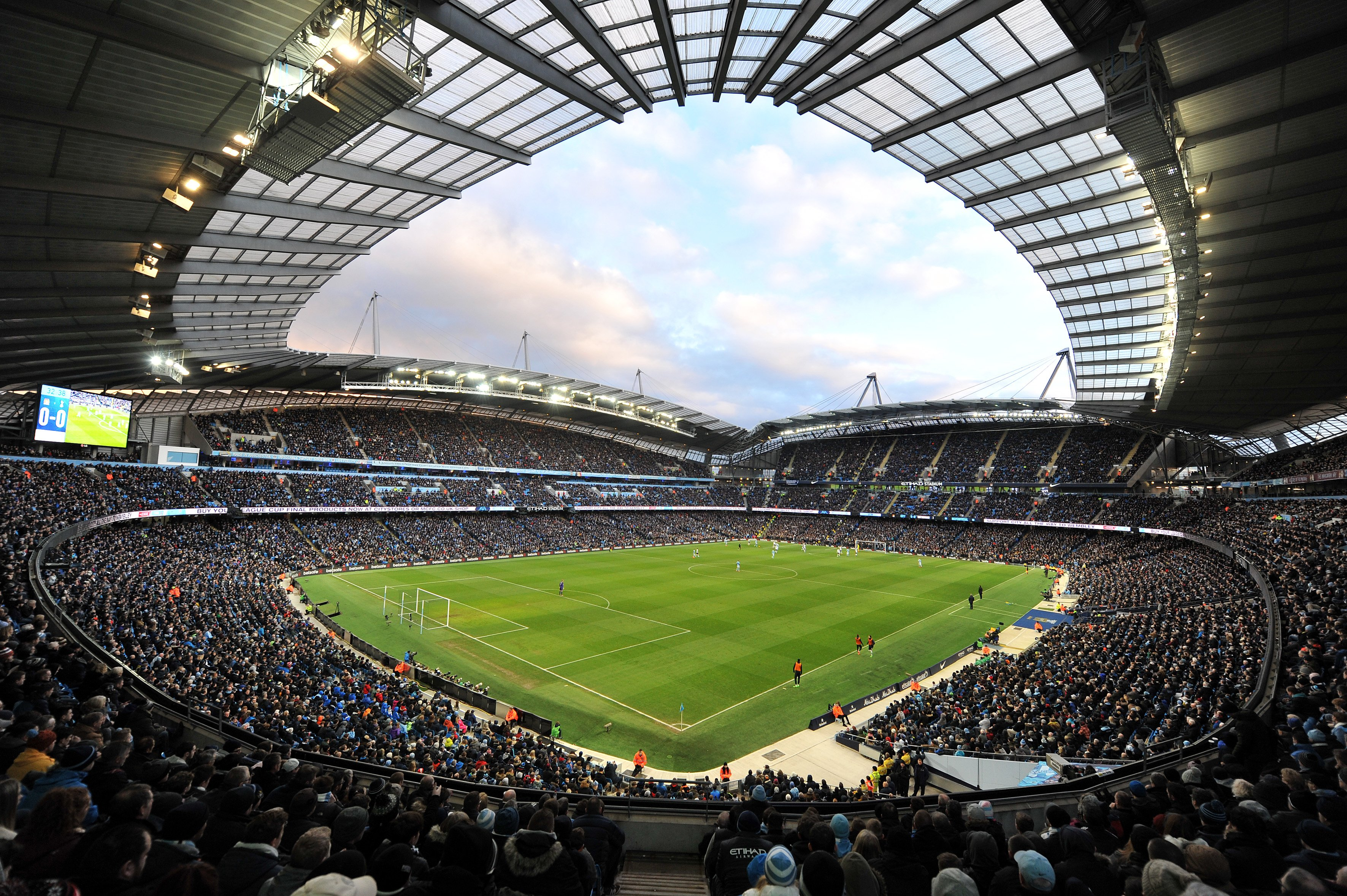

== Results ==
All times listed are British Summer Time (UTC+1)

=== Iceland vs Japan ===
30 May 2004
12:00

Iceland	2–3	Japan
Helguson 5', 50'	Report	Kubo 21', 36'; Alex 57' (pen.)

City of Manchester Stadium, Manchester
Attendance: 3,085
Referee: Mike Riley (England)

Iceland
Japan

GK	1	Árni Gautur Arason
DF	2	Ívar Ingimarsson
DF	5	Pétur Marteinsson
DF	7	Hermann Hreiðarsson
MF	10	Thordur Guðjónsson
MF	4	Joey Guðjónsson
MF	6	Brynjar Gunnarsson	(red card) 82'
MF	8	Arnar Grétarsson
MF	3	Indriði Sigurðsson		(substituted off) 75'
FW	11	Heiðar Helguson
FW	9	Eiður Guðjohnsen (c)
Substitutions:
FW	18	Marel Baldvinsson		(substituted on) 75'
Managers:
Ásgeir Sigurvinsson & Logi Ólafsson

GK	1	Seigo Narazaki
DF	22	Yuji Nakazawa
DF	5	Tsuneyasu Miyamoto (c)
DF	3	Keisuke Tsuboi	(substituted off) 46'
MF	21	Akira Kaji
MF	18	Shinji Ono	(substituted off) 60'
MF	6	Junichi Inamoto	(substituted off) 46'
MF	14	Alex
MF	10	Shunsuke Nakamura	(substituted off) 46'
FW	9	Tatsuhiko Kubo	(substituted off) 46'
FW	20	Keiji Tamada	(substituted off) 46'
Substitutions:
MF	4	Yasuhito Endō	(substituted on) 60'
MF	8	Mitsuo Ogasawara	(substituted on) 46'
FW	11	Takayuki Suzuki	(substituted on) 46'
FW	13	Atsushi Yanagisawa	(substituted on) 46'
MF	15	Takashi Fukunishi	(substituted on) 46'
MF	19	Masashi Motoyama	(substituted on) 46'
Manager:
(Brazil) Zico

=== England vs Japan ===
1 June 2004
20:00

England	1–1	Japan
Owen 22'	Report	Ono 53'

City of Manchester Stadium, Manchester
Attendance: 38,581
Referee: Roberto Rosetti (Italy)

England
Japan

GK	1	David James
RB	2	Gary Neville	(substituted off) 86'
CB	6	John Terry	(substituted off) 88'
CB	5	Sol Campbell
LB	3	Ashley Cole
MF	8	Paul Scholes	(substituted off) 77'
MF	7	David Beckham (c)	(substituted off) 82'
MF	4	Steven Gerrard	(substituted off) 82'
MF	11	Frank Lampard	(substituted off) 82'
FW	10	Michael Owen	(substituted off) 77'
FW	9	Wayne Rooney	(substituted off) 77'
Substitutions:
DF	14	Phil Neville	(substituted on) 86'
DF	15	Ledley King	(substituted on) 88'
MF	17	Nicky Butt	(substituted on) 82'
MF	18	Owen Hargreaves	(substituted on) 82'
MF	19	Joe Cole	(substituted on) 82'
MF	20	Kieron Dyer	(substituted on) 77'
FW	21	Emile Heskey	(substituted on) 77'
FW	23	Darius Vassell	(substituted on) 77'
Manager:
(Sweden) Sven-Göran Eriksson

GK	1	Seigo Narazaki
DF	22	Yuji Nakazawa
DF	5	Tsuneyasu Miyamoto (c)
DF	3	Keisuke Tsuboi
MF	14	Alex
MF	18	Shinji Ono
MF	6	Junichi Inamoto	(substituted off) 75'
MF	21	Akira Kaji
MF	10	Shunsuke Nakamura
FW	20	Keiji Tamada	(substituted off) 60'
FW	9	Tatsuhiko Kubo	(substituted off) 60'
Substitutions:
FW	11	Takayuki Suzuki	(substituted on) 60'
FW	13	Atsushi Yanagisawa	(substituted on) 60'
MF	15	Takashi Fukunishi	(substituted on) 75'
Manager:
(Brazil) Zico

Assistant referees:
Alessandro Stagnoli (Italy)
Alessandro Griselli (Italy)

=== England vs Iceland ===
5 June 2004
15:30

England	6–1	Iceland
Lampard 25'; Rooney 27', 38'; Vassell 57', 77'; Bridge 68'	Report	Helguson 49'

City of Manchester Stadium, Manchester
Attendance: 43,500
Referee: Jan Wegereef (Netherlands)

England
Iceland

GK	1	Paul Robinson	(substituted off) 60'
RB	2	Gary Neville	(substituted off) 46'
CB	6	Jamie Carragher	(substituted off) 84'
CB	5	Sol Campbell	(substituted off) 46'
LB	3	Ashley Cole	(substituted off) 46'
MF	8	Paul Scholes	(substituted off) 46'
MF	7	David Beckham (c)	(substituted off) 46'
MF	4	Steven Gerrard	(substituted off) 46'
MF	11	Frank Lampard	(substituted off) 46'
FW	10	Michael Owen	(substituted off) 46'
FW	9	Wayne Rooney	(substituted off) 46'
Substitutions:
DF	12	Wayne Bridge	(substituted on) 46'
DF	14	Phil Neville	(substituted on) 46'
DF	15	Ledley King	(substituted on) 46'
FW	16	Jermain Defoe	(substituted on) 84'
MF	17	Nicky Butt	(substituted on) 46'
MF	18	Owen Hargreaves	(substituted on) 46'
MF	19	Joe Cole	(substituted on) 46'
MF	20	Kieron Dyer	(substituted on) 46'
FW	21	Emile Heskey	(substituted on) 46'
GK	22	Ian Walker	(substituted on) 60'
FW	23	Darius Vassell	(substituted on) 46'
Manager:
(Sweden) Sven-Göran Eriksson

GK	1	Árni Gautur Arason
DF	2	Ívar Ingimarsson
DF	3	Indriði Sigurðsson	(substituted off) 69'
DF	5	Pétur Marteinsson	(substituted off) 46'
MF	7	Hermann Hreiðarsson
MF	10	Thordur Guðjónsson	(substituted off) 78'
MF	4	Joey Guðjónsson	(substituted off) 88'
MF	8	Arnar Grétarsson
FW	9	Eiður Guðjohnsen (c)
FW	6	Heiðar Helguson	(substituted off) 86'
FW	11	Helgi Sigurðsson	(substituted off) 78'
Substitutions:
DF	13	Kristján Örn Sigurðsson	(substituted on) 46'
DF	14	Auðun Helgason	(substituted on) 88'
DF	15	Hjálmar Jónsson	(substituted on) 78'
FW	16	Tryggvi Guðmundsson	(substituted on) 86'
MF	17	Bjarni Guðjónsson	(substituted on) 69'
MF	19	Jóhann Guðmundsson	(substituted on) 78'
Managers:
Ásgeir Sigurvinsson & Logi Ólafsson

Assistant referees:
Jantinus Meints (Netherlands)
Gyuri Takács (Netherlands)

== Final standings ==
Team	Pld	W	D	L	GF	GA	GD	Pts
England	2	1	1	0	7	2	+5	4
Japan	2	1	1	0	4	3	+1	4
Iceland	2	0	0	2	3	9	–6	0

== Goalscorers ==
3 Goals

- (Iceland) Heiðar Helguson

2 Goals

- (England) Wayne Rooney
- (England) Darius Vassell
- (Japan) Tatsuhiko Kubo

1 Goal

- (England) Wayne Bridge
- (England) Frank Lampard
- (England) Michael Owen
- (Japan) Alex
- (Japan) Shinji Ono
