= 2006–07 Chester City F.C. season =

Chester City
2006–07 season
- Manager: Mark Wright
- Stadium: Deva Stadium
- Football League Two: 18th
- FA Cup: Round 3
- Football League Cup: Round 1
- Football League Trophy: Round 2
- Top goalscorer: League: Jonathan Walters (9); All: Jonathan Walters (10)
- Highest home attendance: 4,206 vs Wrexham (20 August)
- Lowest home attendance: 1,527 vs Boston United (5 December)
- Average home league attendance: 2,473; 20th in division

The 2006–07 season was the 65th season of competitive association football in the Football League played by Chester City, an English club based in Chester, Cheshire.

Also, it was the third season spent in the Football League Two, after the promotion from the Football Conference in 2004. Alongside competing in the Football League the club also participated in the FA Cup, the Football League Cup and the Football League Trophy.

== Football League ==
Pos	Team	Pld	W	D	L	GF	GA	GD	Pts
16	Hereford United	46	14	13	19	45	53	−8	55
17	Mansfield Town	46	14	12	20	58	63	−5	54
18	Chester City	46	13	14	19	40	48	−8	53
19	Wrexham	46	13	12	21	43	65	−22	51
20	Accrington Stanley	46	13	11	22	70	81	−11	50

Rules for classification: In the Football League goals scored (GF) takes precedence over goal difference (GD).

=== Results summary ===
Overall								Home						Away					
Pld	W	D	L	GF	GA	GD	Pts	W	D	L	GF	GA	GD	W	D	L	GF	GA	GD
46	13	14	19	40	48	−8	53	7	9	7	23	23	0	6	5	12	17	25	−8

Source: rsssf.com

=== Results by matchday ===
Round	1	2	3	4	5	6	7	8	9	10	11	12	13	14	15	16	17	18	19	20	21	22	23	24	25	26	27	28	29	30	31	32	33	34	35	36	37	38	39	40	41	42	43	44	45	46
Result	W	W	L	L	D	L	L	D	L	W	D	W	D	D	W	L	L	D	L	W	W	W	L	L	W	W	L	D	D	W	D	W	L	D	D	L	L	L	W	L	D	L	D	L	D	L
Position	3	2	7	12	12	13	16	16	19	15	16	14	13	13	10	16	16	15	16	15	14	10	14	15	15	10	14	12	11	10	12	11	12	12	12	14	14	14	13	13	14	16	17	17	18	18

Source: 11v11.com
W = Win; D = Draw; L = Loss

=== Matches ===
Date	Opponents	Venue	Result	Score	Scorers	Attendance
5 August	Accrington Stanley	H	W	2–0	Broughton, Blundell	3,779
8 August	Bury	A	W	3–1	Walters (2), Woodthorpe (o.g.)	2,719
12 August	Hereford United	A	L	0–2		3,834
20 August	Wrexham	H	L	1–2	Hand	4,206
26 August	Torquay United	A	D	2–2	Broughton, Martínez	2,541
1 September	Swindon Town	H	L	0–2		3,382
9 September	Wycombe Wanderers	A	L	0–1		4,277
12 September	Notts County	H	D	0–0		1,818
16 September	Grimsby Town	H	L	0–2		1,957
23 September	Milton Keynes Dons	A	W	2–1	Westwood, Walters	5,476
26 September	Macclesfield Town	A	D	1–1	Sandwith	2,022
30 September	Bristol Rovers	H	W	2–0	Sandwith, Martínez	2,151
6 October	Walsall	H	D	0–0		3,241
14 October	Rochdale	A	D	0–0		3,149
20 October	Hartlepool United	H	W	2–1	Westwood, Walters	2,580
28 October	Barnet	A	L	0–1		2,301
3 November	Darlington	A	L	0–1		3,630
17 November	Stockport County	H	D	1–1	Walters	3,624
25 November	Shrewsbury Town	A	L	1–2	Blundell	4,464
5 December	Boston United	H	W	3–1	Blundell (2), Walters	1,527
9 December	Lincoln City	H	W	4–1	Blundell, Walters, Martínez, Wilson	2,142
16 December	Peterborough United	A	W	2–0	Walters, Arber (o.g.)	4,491
26 December	Macclesfield Town	H	L	0–3		3,365
30 December	Milton Keynes Dons	H	L	0–3		2,271
1 January	Notts County	A	W	2–1	Walters, Westwood	4,019
9 January	Grimsby Town	A	W	2–0	Artell, Blundell	3,012
13 January	Wycombe Wanderers	H	L	0–1		2,336
20 January	Bristol Rovers	A	D	0–0		5,694
27 January	Mansfield Town	H	D	1–1	Steele	2,129
3 February	Accrington Stanley	A	W	1–0	Linwood	1,900
18 February	Wrexham	A	D	0–0		6,801
21 February	Bury	H	W	1–0	Yeo	1,642
24 February	Swindon Town	A	L	0–1		5,462
27 February	Hereford United	H	D	1–1	Yeo	1,842
2 March	Torquay United	H	D	1–1	Bennett	1,996
6 March	Mansfield Town	A	L	1–2	Maylett	2,366
10 March	Walsall	A	L	0–1		5,282
16 March	Rochdale	H	L	0–1		2,179
24 March	Barnet	H	W	2–0	Bolland, Hand	1,591
30 March	Hartlepool United	A	L	0–3		6,059
6 April	Darlington	H	D	1–1	Yeo	1,942
9 April	Stockport County	A	L	0–2		5,719
15 April	Shrewsbury Town	H	D	0–0		3,296
21 April	Boston United	A	L	0–1		1,752
28 April	Peterborough United	H	D	1–1	Yeo	1,905
5 May	Lincoln City	A	L	0–2		5,267

== FA Cup ==
Round	Date	Opponents	Venue	Result	Score	Scorers	Attendance
First round	11 November	Clevedon Town	A	W	4–1	Wilson, Hand, Walters, Blundell	2,261
Second round	2 December	Bury	A	D	2–2	Steele (2)	3,428
Second round replay	12 December	Bury	H	L	1–3	Wilson	2,810
Chester were reinstated in the FA Cup after Bury were disqualified for fielding an ineligible player.
Third round	6 January	Ipswich Town	H	D	0–0		4,330
Third round replay	16 January	Ipswich Town	A	L	0–1		11,732

== Football League Cup ==
Round	Date	Opponents	Venue	Result	Score	Scorers	Attendance
First round	22 August	Leeds United (2)	A	L	0–1		10,013

== Football League Trophy ==
Round	Date	Opponents	Venue	Result	Score	Scorers	Attendance
First round	31 October	Stockport County (4)	H	W	3–0	Hand, Blundell, Wilson	1,229
Second round	29 November	Chesterfield (3)	A	L	4–4 (p.1–3)	Blundell, Wilson, Linwood, Bolland	2,414

== Season statistics ==
Nat	Player	Total		League		FA Cup		League Cup		FL Trophy	
Nat	Player	A	G	A	G	A	G	A	G	A	G
Goalkeepers
(England)	John Danby	54	–	46	–	5	–	1	–	2	–
Field players
(England)	Graham Allen	2+1	–	2+1	–	–	–	–	–	–	–
(England)	David Artell	49+1	1	42+1	1	5	–	1	–	1	–
(England)	Dean Bennett	31+7	1	27+5	1	2+2	–	–	–	2	–
(England)	Gregg Blundell	27+7	9	21+6	6	3+1	1	1	–	2	2
(England)	Phil Bolland	29+3	2	23+3	1	4	–	–	–	2	1
(England)	Drewe Broughton	10+5	2	9+5	2	–	–	1	–	–	–
(Australia)	Royce Brownlie	3+1	–	3+1	–	–	–	–	–	–	–
(Republic of Ireland)	Glenn Cronin	1+3	–	1+3	–	–	–	–	–	–	–
(England)	Jamie Hand	50	4	43	2	5	1	1	–	1	1
(England)	Sean Hessey	27+4	–	22+4	–	3	–	–	–	2	–
(England)	Chris Holroyd	7+18	–	7+15	–	0+1	–	0+1	–	0+1	–
(Republic of Ireland)	Alan Kearney	4+2	–	4+2	–	–	–	–	–	–	–
(England)	Shaun Kelly	0+2	–	0+2	–	–	–	–	–	–	–
(England)	Paul Linwood	36+5	2	33+4	1	1+1	–	1	–	1	1
(England)	Simon Marples	28+6	–	24+6	–	3	–	–	–	1	–
(Spain)	Roberto Martínez	38	3	31	3	5	–	1	–	1	–
(England)	Brad Maylett	3+2	1	3+2	1	–	–	–	–	–	–
(England)	Alex Meechan	2+6	–	2+6	–	–	–	–	–	–	–
(England)	Jermaine McSporran	0+1	–	0+1	–	–	–	–	–	–	–
(England)	Ricky Ravenhill	1+2	–	1+2	–	–	–	–	–	–	–
(England)	Paul Rutherford	6+5	–	6+3	–	–	–	0+1	–	0+1	–
(England)	Kevin Sandwith	31+5	2	27+5	2	3	–	–	–	1	–
(England)	Ryan Semple	2+4	–	0+3	–	1+1	–	–	–	1	–
(England)	Lee Steele	13+11	3	11+9	1	1+2	2	–	–	1	–
(England)	James Vaughan	5+2	–	5+1	–	–	–	–	–	0+1	–
(England)	Stephen Vaughan	24+1	–	20	–	2+1	–	1	–	1	–
(Republic of Ireland)	Jonathan Walters	30+3	10	24+2	9	5	1	1	–	0+1	–
(England)	Ashley Westwood	25	3	21	3	2	–	1	–	1	–
(England)	Laurence Wilson	42+7	5	34+7	1	5	2	1	–	2	2
(England)	Simon Yeo	14+1	4	14+1	4	–	–	–	–	–	–
	Own goals	–	2	–	2	–	–	–	–	–	–
	Total	54	54	46	40	5	7	1	–	2	7
