= James Tunnicliffe =

English footballer

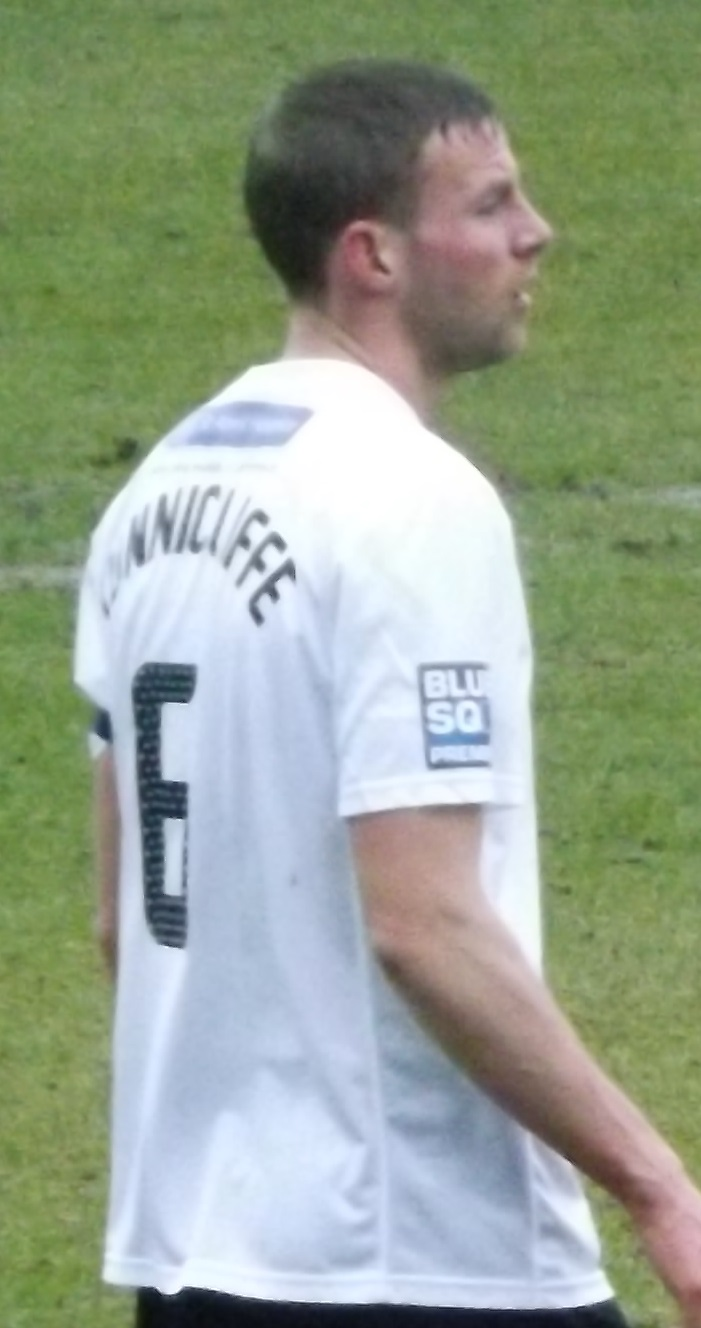
- Tunnicliffe playing for Stockport County in 2013

Personal information
- Full name: James Mark Tunnicliffe
- Date of birth: 17 January 1989 (age 37)
- Place of birth: Denton, England
- Position: Defender

Youth career
- ?–2005: Stockport County

Senior career*
Years	Team	Apps	(Gls)
2005–2009	Stockport County	41	(0)
2007	→ Northwich Victoria (loan)	3	(0)
2009–2011	Brighton & Hove Albion	17	(2)
2010	→ Milton Keynes Dons (loan)	9	(1)
2010–2011	→ Bristol Rovers (loan)	25	(0)
2011–2012	Wycombe Wanderers	17	(1)
2012	→ Crewe Alexandra (loan)	2	(0)
2012–2014	Stockport County	55	(3)
2013–2014	→ Stalybridge Celtic (loan)	10	(1)
Total		179	(8)
- * Club domestic league appearances and goals as of 23:24, 14 September 2015 (UTC)

James Mark Tunnicliffe (born 17 January 1989) is an English former professional footballer.

== Early life ==
Born in Denton, Greater Manchester, Tunnicliffe attended Denton West End Primary School, where he left in 2000. He then attended Audenshaw School in Audenshaw. He grew up with his younger brother Jordan, who played football for West Bromwich Albion F.C., Barnsley F.C. and Stalybridge Celtic F.C.

== Football career ==
=== Early career ===
Tunnicliffe played for his local amateur football team, Reddish Villa, with his younger brother Kristian, until the age of 11 when scouted by Stockport County. Tunnicliffe progressed through Stockport County's Centre of Excellence youth system.

=== Stockport ===
Tunnicliffe made his debut for Stockport as a substitute in a 2–0 defeat at Notts County in 2005 aged just 16. He had a trial at Liverpool in October 2005, but did not impress enough for Liverpool to meet Stockport's price demands. A similar trial at Southampton followed, with Tunnicliffe this time rejecting the offer, feeling that the move wasn't right for his career or him personally.

He was used sparingly in Stockport's first team prior to the 2008–09 season, where injuries to other defenders led to Tunnicliffe making a handful of appearances early in the season, and later the departure of Gareth Owen resulted in him being thrust into regular first team participation. His bright start was rewarded with a two-year contract extension in November 2008, which would keep him with Stockport until May 2011. Stockport manager Jim Gannon said at the time that Tunnicliffe was one of the players that the club needed to retain and build around, and that he had all the attributes of a top class modern-day central defender.

=== Brighton & Hove Albion ===
On 25 June 2009, Tunnicliffe joined League One side Brighton & Hove Albion for an undisclosed fee, signing a three-year contract. After losing his place in the Brighton starting XI under manager Gus Poyet, Tunnicliffe was permitted to leave Brighton on a short-term loan deal to gain more first-team experience. Tunnicliffe initially joined fellow League One club Milton Keynes Dons on loan for a month beginning on 11 February 2010. Poyet stated that "He is joining a good club and we will make sure we keep an eye on his progress and performances while he is there. We will see how things go, but we may extend the deal until the end of the season – but he will be back with us this summer, getting ready for next season."

=== Wycombe Wanderers ===
On 22 June 2011, it was confirmed that Tunnicliffe had signed for recently promoted League One side Wycombe Wanderers. Tunnicliffe's debut came in the 1–1 draw with Scunthorpe United at the start of the 2011–12 season. He scored Wycombe's only goal of the game from a corner taken by Scott Donnelly. On 9 February 2012, he joined League Two side Crewe Alexandra on a one-month loan deal.

He was released by Wycombe in May 2012.

=== Stockport County ===
On 28 June 2012, Tunnicliffe rejoined his former club in the Conference National on a two-year contract, having rejected offers from Football League sides.

=== Stalybridge Celtic ===
On 14 November 2013, Tunnicliffe joined Stalybridge Celtic on loan. He scored one goal in eleven appearances for the club before he returned to Stockport. At the end of February he left Stockport after his contract was cancelled by mutual agreement.

== Honours ==
Stockport County

- Football League Two play-offs: 2008
