= Heiðar Helguson =

Icelandic footballer

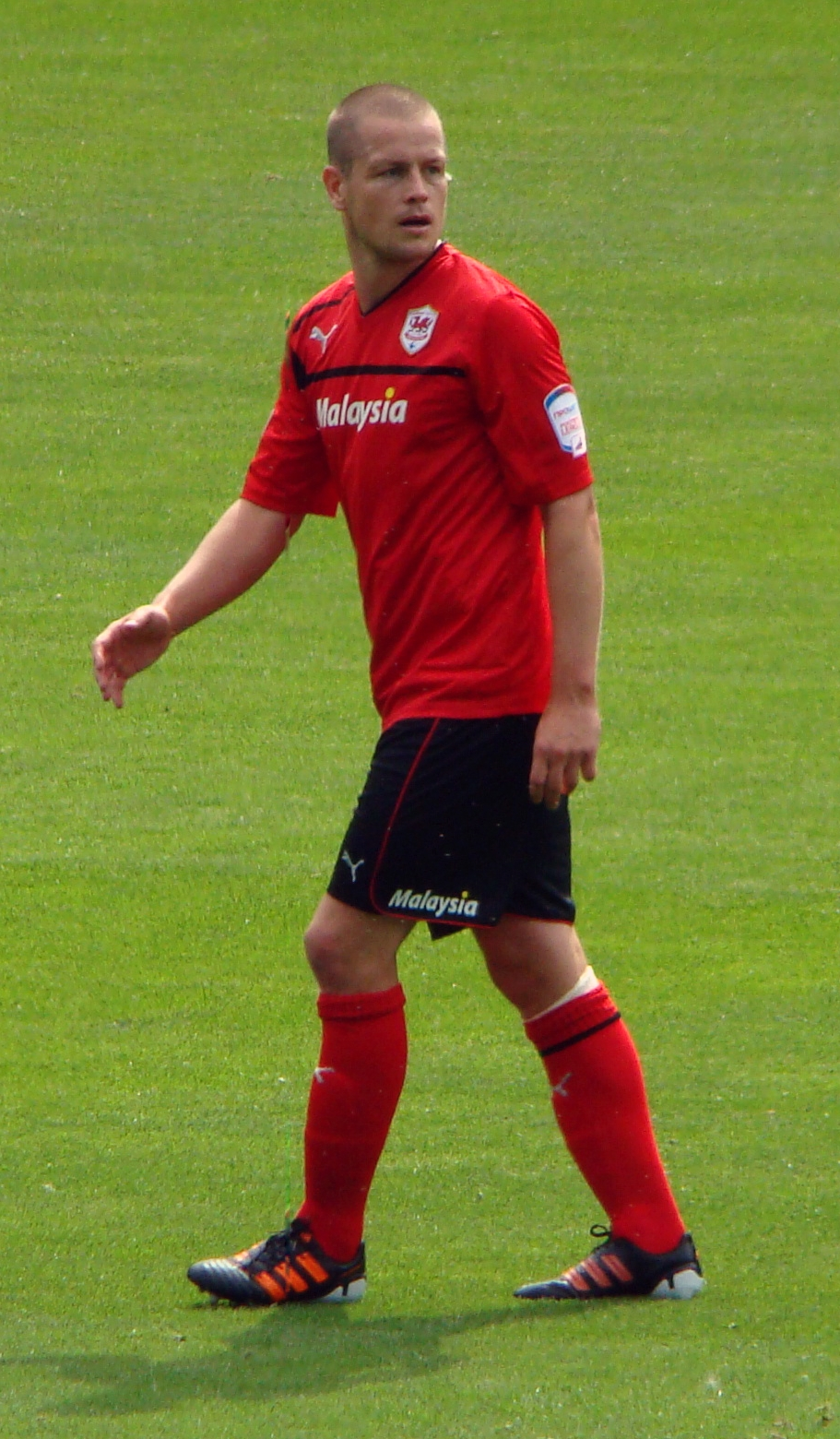
- Heiðar playing for Cardiff City in 2012

Personal information
- Full name: Heiðar Helguson
- Date of birth: 22 August 1977 (age 49)
- Place of birth: Akureyri, Iceland
- Height: 1.78 m (5 ft 10 in)
- Position: Striker

Youth career
- 1985–1993: UMFS Dalvík

Senior career*
Years	Team	Apps	(Gls)
1993–1994	UMFS Dalvík	11	(5)
1995–1997	Þróttur	54	(31)
1998–1999	Lillestrøm	43	(18)
1999–2005	Watford	174	(55)
2005–2007	Fulham	57	(11)
2007–2009	Bolton Wanderers	7	(2)
2008–2009	→ Queens Park Rangers (loan)	7	(3)
2009–2012	Queens Park Rangers	68	(24)
2009–2010	→ Watford (loan)	29	(11)
2012–2013	Cardiff City	38	(8)
2015	Skautafélag Reykjavíkur	2	(1)
Total		490	(169)

International career
1994–1996	Iceland U19	18	(2)
1997–1999	Iceland U21	6	(1)
1999–2011	Iceland	55	(12)
- * Club domestic league appearances and goals

Heiðar Helguson (Icelandic pronunciation: [ˈheiðaːr ˈhɛlkuˌsɔn]; born 22 August 1977) is an Icelandic former professional footballer who played as a striker.

Heiðar started his career in the Icelandic league system, with UMFS Dalvík and Þróttur. Following a one-season spell in Norway with Lillestrøm, Heiðar moved to England to play for Watford in 1999, with Lillestrøm receiving a transfer fee of £1.5 million. The English media anglicised his name to Heidar when he joined Watford – it is by this given name that he is commonly known in England.

Although Watford were relegated from the Premier League during his first season at the club, Heiðar was a prolific goalscorer, finishing as the team's top scorer in the 1999–2000, 2002–03 and 2004–05 seasons, before being sold to Fulham in 2005. He played Premier League for them between 2005 and 2007, and Bolton until 2009, before transferring to Championship side QPR in 2009. After a return to Watford on loan in the 2009–10 season, Heiðar played regularly for QPR in 2010–11, as they secured promotion to the Premier League as champions. In QPR's first Premier League season since 1995–96, Heiðar finished as the team's top scorer, helping them to secure Premier League survival on the last day of the 2011–12 season. He subsequently joined Cardiff City.

Heiðar played and scored for his country at under-19 and under-21 levels, before making his debut for the senior team in 1999. He earned 55 caps for the Iceland national team, scoring 13 goals, before retiring from international football in 2011.

== Club career ==
=== Early career ===
Heiðar was born in Akureyri, in northern Iceland. He joined his first club, UMFS Dalvík, at the age of eight in 1985. He spent a further eight years in the club's development squads, progressing through the different youth team age brackets (Under-10s, Under-12s, Under-15s, etc.) and debuting for the club's reserves whilst he was still only 13. He was handed his first team debut in 1993 when he was 15 years old. He scored five goals in 11 league appearances before his performances earned him a transfer to Þróttur in 1994, aged 16.

In three seasons, Heiðar scored 31 goals in 54 league appearances for Þróttur, his performances generating interest from several European clubs.

=== Lillestrøm ===
Heiðar arrived at Lillestrøm in the autumn of 1998. He made his first team debut in October, curiously wearing number 1 on his shirt. The next season Heiðar became one of the great surprises in Norwegian football when he scored sixteen league goals. In his debut season for Lillestrøm, he had managed only two goals. Heiðar was a very popular player, and even had his own fan-club named "The Helgusonsons".

=== Watford ===
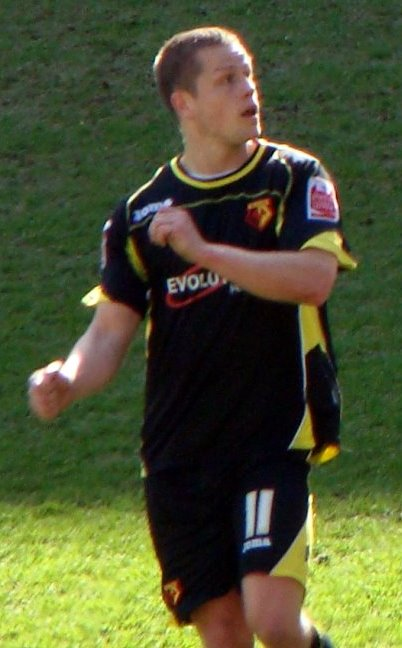
Heiðar playing for Watford in 2010

Heiðar was signed by Watford manager Graham Taylor midway through the 1999–2000 season for a club record £1.5m. Brought in to boost the struggling club's striking department, Heiðar had a good debut at home to Liverpool, where he played well. Heiðar scored in his first game. He later picked up the display of the season award for this goal-scoring debut. He scored five more times that season. His goals were not enough to keep Watford up, and the Hertfordshire club were relegated after only one year in the Premier League.

Back in the First Division, Heiðar was part of a Watford team that was undefeated for the first 15 games of the season, topping the league. However, when the team's form slumped in late 2000, Heiðar suffered a crisis of confidence – one of several during his first few years at Watford – and was well below his best for a large amount of that campaign. At the end of the season, Taylor retired and was replaced by Gianluca Vialli, who used Heiðar as a wing back.

With Ray Lewington in charge for the 2002–03 season, Heiðar showed a marked improvement. Although still prone to injury (he did not start the season until late September), he finished the season Watford's top goal scorer with 13, including goals in Watford's run to the FA Cup semi-Finals. In 2003–04, injury kept Heiðar out of most of the first half of the season. On his return, he put in some notable performances, the most notable being his leading of the line against Chelsea in the FA Cup.

2004–05 was Heiðar's best season in a Watford shirt. Relatively free of injury, he scored 20 goals and picked up the Goal of the Season, Display of the Season and Player of the Season awards at the end of season awards ceremony. Inevitably, his goal tally brought about interest from Premier League clubs and, with Watford needing money, the offer from Fulham was accepted.

=== Fulham ===
Heiðar signed for Fulham on 27 June 2005 and was largely confined to the bench at the beginning of the campaign. He scored his first goal for Fulham in the 5–4 League Cup victory over Lincoln. The front pair of Heiðar and Brian McBride caused trouble to the best defences in the Premier League. Heiðar scored against Chelsea (penalty), Aston Villa (penalty), West Ham (open play – left foot) and Manchester United (open play – header), a double in a 6–1 win over West Brom, Bolton Wanderers (header as a result of a free kick) and against Middlesbrough (penalty). For the start of the 2006–07 season, he was moved from No. 10 to No. 9 at Fulham.

=== Bolton Wanderers ===
On 20 July 2007, it was announced that Heiðar was leaving Fulham to join Bolton Wanderers for an undisclosed fee, as part of manager Sammy Lee's squad restructuring. Heiðar reportedly signed a three-year contract with the Trotters, having been forced to consider his options following the signings of David Healy and Diomansy Kamara.

He made his Bolton debut as a substitute for the injured Kevin Davies on 11 August 2007 with Wanderers already trailing to Newcastle United. Four days later, he returned to Fulham for the first time since leaving and got on the scoresheet in a 2–1 Bolton defeat.

It was the end of January 2008 by the time Heiðar got any more playing time; his return was welcome, with Bolton desperately short of firepower, having sold Nicolas Anelka to Chelsea earlier on that month. His first appearance back in the team was a goalless draw against old club Fulham, where he came off the substitutes bench for the last eight minutes of the game. He scored his first goal for Bolton since coming back from injury four days later against Reading in a 2–0 win.

Bolton confirmed in May 2008 that they had sent Heiðar over to Belgium for more surgery in order to have him back for pre-season training.

=== Queens Park Rangers ===
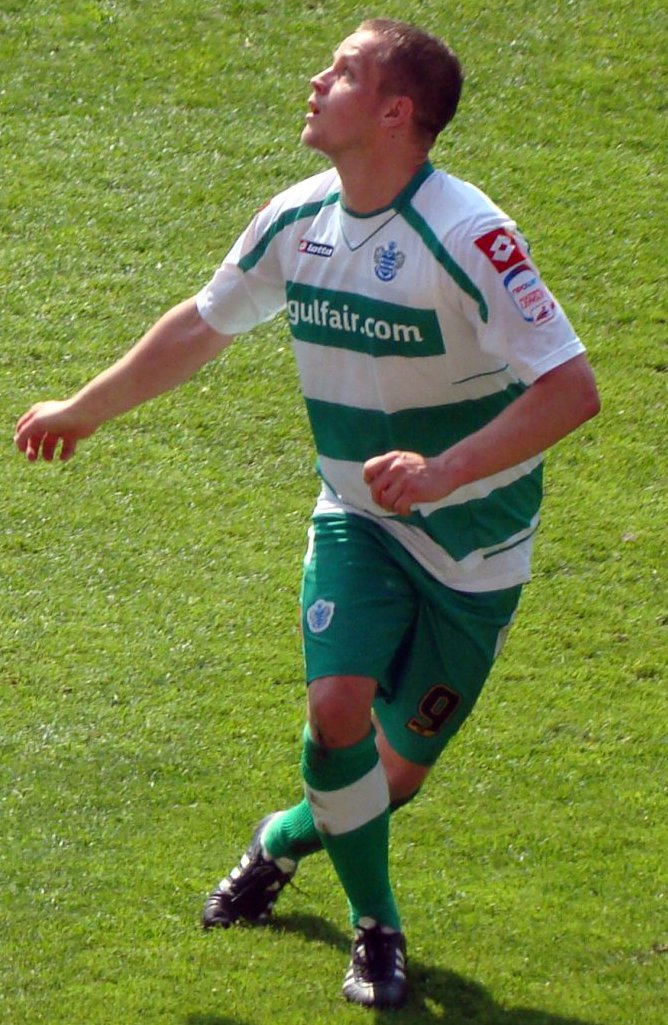
Heiðar playing for Queens Park Rangers in 2011

On 20 November, it was announced that Heiðar had joined Queens Park Rangers on an emergency loan until the end of January 2009. However, the loan did not go through until the following Friday.

After failing to score on his debut against Wolverhampton Wanderers and in his second match against Sheffield Wednesday, Heiðar scored once against Plymouth Argyle and braces against both Preston North End and Blackpool to bag himself five goals in his first ten games. On 2 January, the deal was made permanent for an undisclosed fee.

After spending a nearly a season out on loan to Watford, Heiðar returned to QPR. After regaining his place in the starting XI, scoring 13 goals as Rangers won the Championship in the 2010–11 season, including a late winner against London rivals Crystal Palace at Loftus Road. Heiðar featured regularly under Neil Warnock for QPR in the Premier League, Heiðar became a Rangers legend by scoring the winning goal from a penalty in a 1–0 victory against arch rivals Chelsea. This was QPR's first win over Chelsea in over 15 years. He then went on to score two goals against Stoke in a 3–2 victory away from home. He headed in a sublime goal, whilst the other goal was a tap in.

On 3 December 2011, he managed to equal the Queens Park Rangers record for most goals at home in a row. He scored with a header in a 1–1 draw with West Bromwich Albion.

Despite missing most of the second half of the season with a groin injury, Heiðar finished as QPR's top goalscorer for the 2011–12 season with nine goals in all competitions. These goals proved crucial as Rangers avoided relegation on the final day of the season despite a 3–2 defeat away to Champions Manchester City.

=== Return to Watford ===
On 15 September 2009, Watford successfully acquired the services of Heiðar, on a three-month loan from Queens Park Rangers, meaning the player returned to the club who he played for between 2000 and 2005. He made an immediate impact on his return, assisting one and scoring a brace during his substitute appearance against Leicester City, before being substituted due to injury. He made his fourth appearance of his loan spell at Vicarage Road against Scunthorpe United, scoring his fourth and fifth goal. Whilst the original loan spell ended on 28 December, there was constant speculation about the player resigning for the club on loan. On 11 January, both clubs confirmed that the loan deal was to be extended until the end of the season.

=== Cardiff City ===
On 2 August 2012, Heiðar signed for Cardiff City on a one-year deal for an undisclosed fee and was given the number 22 shirt. Heiðar scored his first goal for Cardiff in a pre-season friendly against Bournemouth and his second came from the spot against Northampton Town in the League Cup on 14 August. He scored his first league goal in a Cardiff shirt in the Severnside derby on 25 August in a 4–2 loss. He then went on to score a brace against Ipswich Town, which kept Cardiff top of the table. Heiðar collected further goals for City at both Nottingham Forest and Charlton Athletic and at home against Hull City. Despite helping Cardiff secure promotion to the Premier League, Heiðar left the club when his contract expired at the end of the season.

=== Skautafélag Reykjavíkur ===
In May 2015, Heiðar signed with Skautafélag Reykjavíkur. He appeared in two games for SR, netting one goal.

== International career ==
Heiðar made his debut for Iceland in an April 1999 friendly match against Malta, coming on as a substitute for Ríkharður Daðason, and as of October 2010 has earned 52 caps, scoring 12 goals. He was top scorer in the 2004 FA Summer Tournament with three goals. After playing in a friendly against Spain in August 2006, a long spell outside the national team followed during which Heiðar announced his retirement from international football, in June 2007.

On 28 August 2008, Heiðar announced his return to international football and was immediately selected in the Icelandic team to face Norway and Scotland a few days later. He scored a goal against Norway in the World Cup qualifier as the match ended 2–2.

== Career statistics ==
=== Club ===
Appearances and goals by club, season and competition
Club	Season	League			National cup		League cup		Continental		Total	
Club	Season	Division	Apps	Goals	Apps	Goals	Apps	Goals	Apps	Goals	Apps	Goals
Watford	1999–2000	Premier League	16	6	0	0	0	0	—		16	6
Watford	2000–01	First Division	33	8	1	0	3	1	—		37	9
Watford	2001–02	First Division	34	6	1	0	5	1	—		40	7
Watford	2002–03	First Division	30	11	4	2	0	0	—		34	13
Watford	2003–04	First Division	22	8	1	1	1	0	—		14	9
Watford	2004–05	Championship	39	16	2	1	5	3	—		46	20
Watford	Total		174	55	9	4	14	6	0	0	197	65
Fulham	2005–06	Premier League	27	8	0	0	2	2	—		29	10
Fulham	2006–07	Premier League	30	3	3	0	1	1	—		34	4
Fulham	Total		57	11	3	0	3	3	0	0	63	14
Bolton Wanderers	2007–08	Premier League	6	2	0	0	0	0	2 (Note: Appearances in UEFA Cup)	0	8	2
Bolton Wanderers	2008–09	Premier League	1	0	0	0	1	0	—		2	0
Bolton Wanderers	Total		7	2	0	0	1	0	2	0	10	2
Queens Park Rangers (loan)	2008–09	Championship	20	5	1	0	—		—		21	5
Queens Park Rangers	2009–10	Championship	5	1	1	0	0	0	—		5	1
Queens Park Rangers	2010–11	Championship	34	13	0	0	0	0	—		34	13
Queens Park Rangers	2011–12	Premier League	16	8	2	1	1	1	—		19	10
Queens Park Rangers	Total		75	28	5	0	0	0	0	0	80	28
Watford (loan)	2009–10	Championship	29	11	—		0	0	—		29	11
Cardiff City	2012–13	Championship	38	8	0	0	1	1	—		39	9
Career total			380	114	17	4	18	9	2	0	418	129

=== International ===
Appearances and goals by national team and year
National team	Year	Apps	Goals
Iceland	1999	7	0
Iceland	2000	7	1
Iceland	2001	6	0
Iceland	2002	3	1
Iceland	2003	2	0
Iceland	2004	8	3
Iceland	2005	5	1
Iceland	2006	2	0
Iceland	2007	–	
Iceland	2008	3	2
Iceland	2009	3	0
Iceland	2010	6	4
Iceland	2011	3	0
Total		55	12

Scores and results list Iceland's goal tally first, score column indicates score after each Helguson goal.

List of international goals scored by Heiðar Helguson
No.	Date	Venue	Opponent	Score	Result	Competition
1	27 July 2000	Laugardalsvöllur, Reykjavík, Iceland	Malta	3–0	5–0	Friendly
2	16 October 2002	Laugardalsvöllur, Reykjavík, Iceland	Lithuania	1–0	3–0	UEFA Euro 2004 qualification
3	30 May 2004	City of Manchester Stadium, Manchester, England	Japan	1–0	2–3	2004 FA Summer Tournament
4	30 May 2004	City of Manchester Stadium, Manchester, England	Japan	2–2	2–3	2004 FA Summer Tournament
5	5 June 2004	City of Manchester Stadium, Manchester, England	England	1–3	1–6	2004 FA Summer Tournament
6	17 August 2005	Laugardalsvöllur, Reykjavík, Iceland	South Africa	3–1	4–1	Friendly
7	6 September 2008	Ullevaal Stadion, Oslo, Norway	Norway	1–0	2–2	2010 FIFA World Cup qualification
8	19 November 2008	Hibernians Stadium, Paola, Malta	Malta	1–0	1–0	Friendly
9	29 May 2010	Laugardalsvöllur, Reykjavík, Iceland	Andorra	1–0	4–0	Friendly
10	29 May 2010	Laugardalsvöllur, Reykjavík, Iceland	Andorra	2–0	4–0	Friendly
11	3 September 2010	Laugardalsvöllur, Reykjavík, Iceland	Norway	1–0	1–2	UEFA Euro 2012 qualification
12	12 October 2010	Laugardalsvöllur, Reykjavík, Iceland	Portugal	1–1	1–3	UEFA Euro 2012 qualification

== Honours ==
Queens Park Rangers

- Football League Championship: 2010–11

Cardiff City

- Football League Championship: 2012–13
