= Elliott Godfrey =

Canadian soccer player (born 1983)

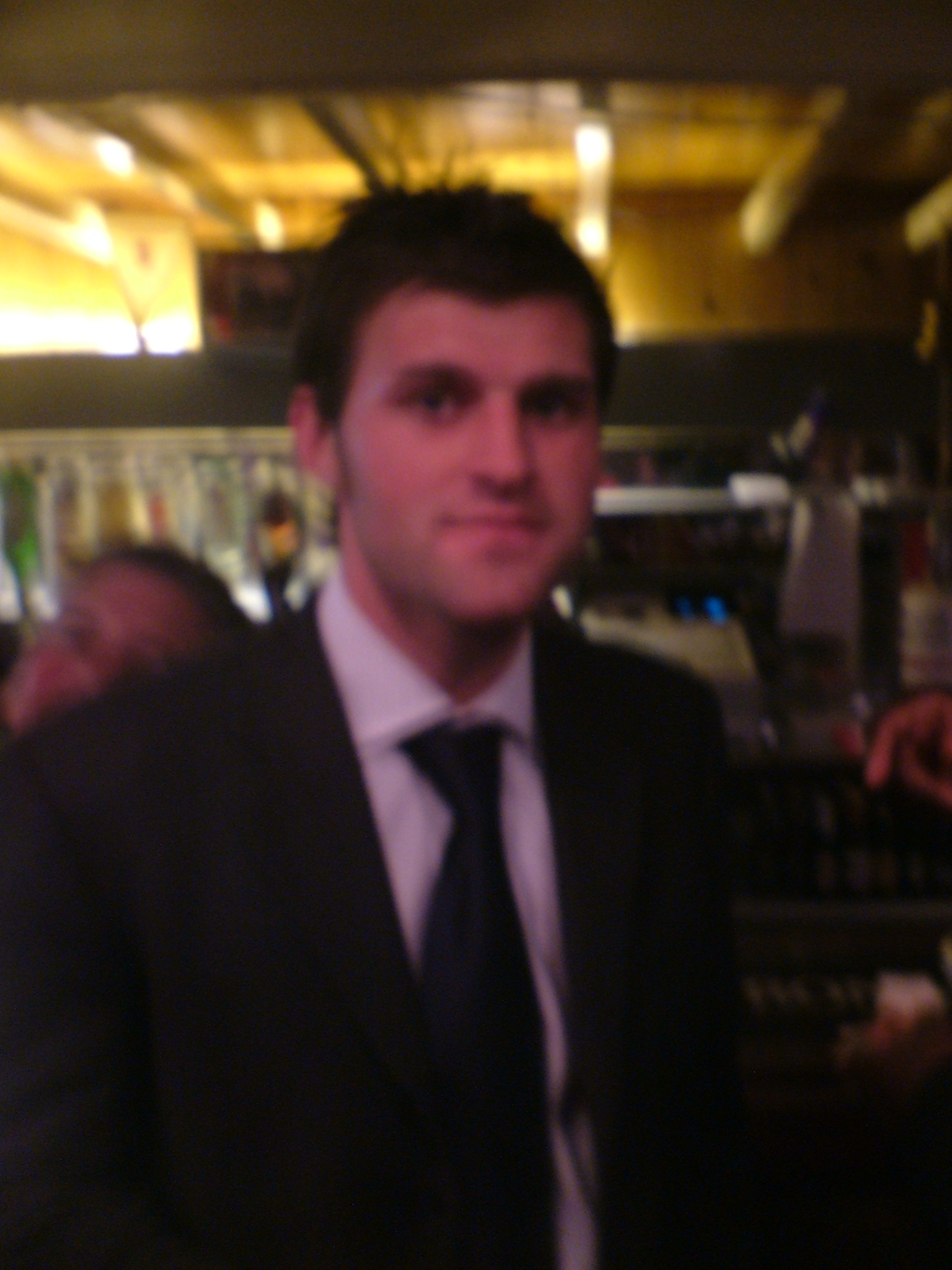

Personal information
- Full name: Elliott Godfrey
- Date of birth: 22 February 1983 (age 43)
- Place of birth: Toronto, Ontario, Canada
- Height: 5 ft 9 in (1.75 m)
- Position: Midfielder

Team information
- Current team: Kings Langley (on loan from Wealdstone)
- Number: 8

Senior career*
| Years | Team | Apps | (Gls) |
| 2000–2004 | Watford | 1 | (0) |
| 2004–2008 | Hampton & Richmond Borough | 104 | (19) |
| 2008–2010 | AFC Wimbledon | 57 | (10) |
| 2010 | → Staines Town (loan) | 5 | (0) |
| 2010–2011 | Boreham Wood | 32 | (8) |
| 2011–2012 | Hendon | 41 | (5) |
| 2012–2013 | Staines Town | 19 | (1) |
| 2013– | Wealdstone | 94 | (7) |
| 2017 | → St. Albans City (loan) | 5 | (2) |
| 2017 | → Cheshunt (loan) | 6 | (0) |
| 2017– | → Kings Langley (loan) | 6 | (0) |

International career
| 2002–2003 | Canada U-20 | 8 | (2) |
| 2003–2004 | Canada U-23 | 3 | (1) |
- * Club domestic league appearances and goals as of 6 December 2017

Elliott Godfrey (born 22 February 1983) is a Canadian soccer player who plays for Kings Langley, on loan from Wealdstone.

== Club career ==
=== Watford ===
Godfrey spent most of his young life in the UK, and came through the Watford youth and reserve setup.

He made his singular professional appearance for Watford on 4 March 2003, coming on as an 86th-minute substitute in a 1–0 home defeat to Preston North End. After his release from Watford on 11 May 2004, Hampton & Richmond Borough offered him a contract. Whilst at Watford he played for the Canadian under-21 squad.

=== Hampton & Richmond Borough ===
Godfrey signed a one-year contract with Hampton & Richmond Borough in August 2004, but did not appear in a game until a home match in October 2004 against Windsor & Eton in the Isthmian League Premier Division, where he came off the bench to score the winner in a 2–1 victory for his new club.

He signed contracts for the following two seasons and was contracted with Hampton until summer 2008.

=== AFC Wimbledon ===
Godfrey was signed by AFC Wimbledon manager Terry Brown on 24 June 2008 from local rivals Hampton & Richmond, scoring his first goal in the second league game of the season, a 2–1 win against Thurrock and helping them gain promotion to Conference National in his first season. Godfrey was released by AFC Wimbledon on 26 April 2010.

=== Staines Town ===
In March 2010 Godfrey was loaned to [Staines Town and made his debut on 13 March in a 3:0 win over Woking F.C.

=== Boreham Wood ===
Godfrey joined Boreham Wood in May 2010.

=== Hendon ===
In August 2011, Godfrey joined Hendon.

=== Staines Town ===
In June 2012, Godfrey returned to Staines Town in a move back to the Conference South.

=== Wealdstone ===
On 31 January 2013, Godfrey signed on a free transfer for Isthmian League Premier Division team Wealdstone.

=== St. Albans City ===
In April 2013 signed a loan contract with St. Albans City and played his debut on 14 April, in a 4–3 loss to Chippenham Town.

=== Cheshunt ===
On 17 September 2017 Godfrey signed for Cheshunt on loan. He played his debut for Cheshunt, in a 2–0 win over Waltham Abbey.

=== Kings Langley ===
On 7 November 2017 he dual registered with Kings Langley, making his debut four days later against Weymouth.

== International career ==
He has represented Canada at youth level and made 8 appearances for the U-20 team and 3 for the U-23 team.
