= Anthony McNamee =

English footballer (born 1984)

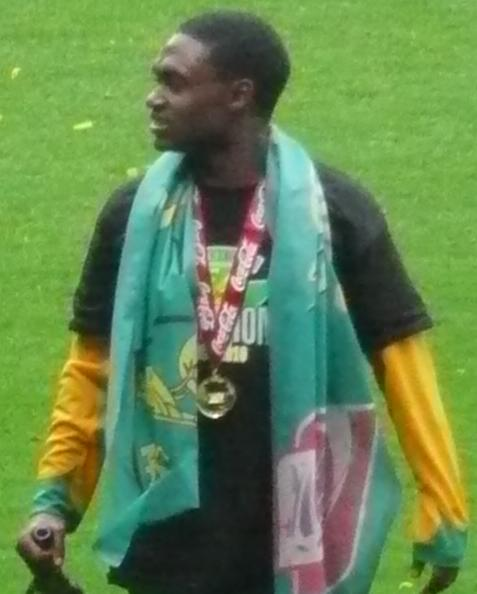

Personal information
- Full name: Anthony McNamee
- Date of birth: 13 July 1984 (age 42)
- Place of birth: Kennington, England
- Height: 5 ft 6 in (1.68 m)
- Position: Midfielder

Youth career
- ?–2002: Watford

Senior career*
Years	Team	Apps	(Gls)
2002–2008	Watford	91	(2)
2003–2004	→ Barnet (loan)	5	(0)
2007	→ Crewe Alexandra (loan)	5	(0)
2008–2010	Swindon Town	79	(3)
2009–2010	→ Norwich City (loan)	2	(0)
2010–2011	Norwich City	32	(1)
2011–2012	Milton Keynes Dons	7	(0)
2011–2012	→ Wycombe Wanderers (loan)	15	(2)
2012–2013	Macclesfield Town	4	(0)
2013	Aldershot Town	1	(0)
2013–2014	Woking	7	(0)
Total		248	(8)

International career
2002–2003	England U19	2	(0)
2003	England U20	1	(0)

Managerial career
- 2021–2023: Enfield Borough
- * Club domestic league appearances and goals

Anthony McNamee (born 13 July 1984) is an English former professional footballer who played as a left-sided midfielder, and current football manager.

== Career ==
=== Watford ===
Born in Kennington, England, McNamee began his career at Watford. He quickly progressed through the ranks of Watford's youth system and then to the first team. McNamee then progressed through the reserve side. His performance in the reserve team led McNamee being called to the first team by Manager Gianluca Vialli. At some point of early–April, he signed a contract with the club. For the rest of the 2001–02 season, McNamee received a handful of first team football, resulting in him making seven appearances and scoring once for the side, which came against Gillingham in the last game of the season. His progress in the reserve earned praised from Manager Vialli. For his performance, McNamee was awarded 2001–02's Young Player of the Season.

In the 2002–03 season, McNamee appeared in the first team, mostly coming on as a substitute. He spent at the start of the season in and out at the first team. The club's manager Ray Lewington said about McNamee in September 2002, saying: "I would agree with that and they did quite well. He is going to be the worst-kept secret. They showed him inside, which I would do if I was playing against him and that makes the crosses a little bit flatter. We have to work with him so that if he does come inside, he knows what to do then. That is part of his education." For the remaining 2002–03 season, McNamee continued to feature in and out of the first team. At the end of the 2002–03 season, he went on to make twenty–two appearances in all competitions.

McNamee made two appearances for Watford at the start of the 2003–04 season, both coming on as a substitute. After his loan spell at Barnet, McNamee spent the rest of the season, playing for the reserve side.

In the first half of the 2004–05 season, McNamee continued to sit out of the first team, remaining at the reserve side. It wasn't until on 28 December 2004 when he made his first appearance of the season, coming on as a substitute in the 66th minute, in a 0–0 draw against Cardiff City. In a follow–up match against Millwall, McNamee came on as a substitute in the 67th minute, and set up a goal for Heiðar Helguson eight minutes later, in a 1–0 win. McNamee made a number of appearances towards the end of the 2004–05 season, under both Lewington and new manager Aidy Boothroyd. After helping Watford avoid relegation, he signed a one–year contract extension with the club. At the end of the 2004–05 season, McNamee went on to make sixteen appearances in all competitions.

In the 2005–06 season, McNamee continued to regain his first team place for the side. For his performance, he extended his contract until 2008. It wasn't until on 1 November 2005 when McNamee scored his first Watford in over three years, in a 3–1 win over Queens Park Rangers. For the remaining 2005–06 season, McNamee continued to feature in and out of the first team, as Watford were promoted to the Premiership via play–offs. At the end of the 2005–06 season, he went on to make thirty–eight appearances and scoring once in all competitions for the side.

In the 2006–07 Premiership season, McNamee helped the side beat Accrington Stanley in the third round of the League Cup in a penalty-shootout after a tie 0–0 in the regular time and kept after extra-time. It wasn't until on 28 November 2006 when McNamee made his Premier League debut, making a start before being substituted in the 72nd minute, in a 1–0 loss against Sheffield United. He made seven appearances for Watford in the middle of, and also scored the only goal in their fourth round FA Cup victory at West Ham United. Watford would go on to reach the semi-finals of the competition, but McNamee played no further part, as the club was relegated back to the Championship.

Watford returned to the Championship for the 2007–08 season, but McNamee only featured in two League Cup games and once in the league. His first team opportunities at Watford this season has become more limited.

==== Loan Spells from Watford ====
McNamee was loaned out to Barnet on a month loan in December 2003. He went on to make five appearances for the side before returning to Watford in mid–January 2004.

McNamee was sent on loan to League One side Crewe Alexandra in March 2007 for the remainder of the season. He made his Crewe Alexandra debut on 24 March 2007, starting the match before coming off in the 82nd minute, in a 1–0 loss against Rotherham United. He played five times for the Railwaymen.

=== Swindon Town ===
On 18 January 2008, was sold to League One side Swindon Town for an undisclosed fee.

McNamee made his debut for Swindon Town, starting the match before being substituted in the 62nd minute, in a 0–0 draw with Crewe Alexandra on 26 January 2008. Since making his debut for the club, he quickly became a first team regular for the side, establishing himself in the starting eleven for the side. On 12 February 2008 against Cheltenham Town, McNamee then set up a goal for Billy Paynter, as Swindon Town won 3–0. Then on 5 April 2008, he set up two goals, in a 3–0 win over Oldham Athletic. He scored his first goal for Swindon Town two weeks later on 19 April 2008 in a 6–0 win over Port Vale. In the last game of the season, McNamee scored his second goal of the season, in a 2–1 win over Millwall. At the end of the 2007–08 season, he went on to make nineteen appearances and scoring two times in all competitions.

Ahead of the 2008–09 season, during a pre-season friendly with Portsmouth, he impressed Harry Redknapp, who praised him, saying "If he can produce that every week he won't be here long but can he do it regular?". At the start of the 2008–09 season, McNamee continued to regain his first team place for the side. But the club's results were struggling, as well as, his own form, which resulted in him being dropped to the substitute bench for the number of matches. By mid–October, McNamee soon regained his place in the starting eleven. Under the new management of Danny Wilson, McNamee found himself on the substitute bench for several months. Manager Wilson explained his decision to drop McNamme on the substitute bench, citing low confidence. Towards the end of the season, McNamme returned to the starting eleven, playing in the left–wing position. At the end of the 2008–09 season, McNamme went on to make forty–seven appearances in all competitions.

At the start of the 2009–10 season, McNamee found himself competing with new signing Tope Obadeyi over the left–wing position, which resulted in him in the substitute bench in number of matches. But he soon regained his place in the starting eleven. His form continued into the start of the season, as rumours circulated that scouts across the country had their eyes on three Swindon Town players, Peter Brezovan, Simon Cox and Anthony McNamee. Among interested was Norwich City, but Manager Wilson refused to sell him, insisting that he's "going nowhere". Amid the transfer speculation, McNamee scored his first goal in seventeen months, in a 4–3 win over Exeter City in the Football League Trophy campaign on 6 October 2009. Then on 31 October 2009, he scored again, in a 4–1 win over Tranmere Rovers. On 26 November 2009, local newspaper Swindon Advertiser reported that McNamee was absent from training amid a loan move to Norwich City. By the time of his departure, he made twenty–two appearances and scoring two times in all competitions.

=== Norwich City ===
He later signed on an emergency loan to Norwich City with a view to a permanent transfer in the January transfer window. McNamee made his Norwich City debut on 5 December 2010, coming on as a late substitute, in a 2–0 win over Oldham Athletic. Then on 4 January 2010, he signed for Norwich City making his loan move to the club permanent. McNamee's first game after signing for the club on a permanent basis came on 26 January 2010, coming on as a substitute during the second–half, as Norwich City won 2–1 against Walsall. By February, McNamee soon regained his first team place for the side. He played a role when he contributed three assists in three matches between 23 February 2010 and 6 March 2010, all the three matches were wins, as Norwich City were chasing promotion to the Championship. McNamee scored his debut goal for Norwich City to take the lead in a 2–1 home win against Stockport County on 5 April 2010. After Norwich City were champions of League One, he then set up two goals, in a 3–0 win over Bristol City. At the end of the 2009–10 season, McNamee went on to make seventeen appearances and scoring two times in all competitions.

At the start of the 2010–11 season, McNamee started the season, coming on as a substitute in a number of matches. He then set up two goals that contributed wins for Norwich City: the first assist occurred on 21 August 2010 against Swansea City and the second assist occurred on 11 September 2010 against Barnsley. In mid–October, McNamee received a handful of first team football, which saw him make four starts. During a 2–2 draw against Burnley on 6 November 2010, he came on as a substitute and his performance in the full–back position throughout the match was praised by team-mate Russell Martin. Later in the 2010–11 season, McNamee found his first team opportunities limited and spent the rest of the season on the substitute bench. At the end of the 2010–11 season, he went on to make twenty appearances in all competitions.

Following Norwich City's promotion to Premier League in 2011, McNamee found himself out of favour with manager Paul Lambert and was expected to leave the club.

=== Milton Keynes Dons ===
On 31 August 2011, McNamee left Norwich on a free transfer, signing a one-year contract at League One club Milton Keynes Dons with the option of a further year.

He made his debut three days later, as a late substitute in a 3–1 win away at Carlisle United. However, he found his first team opportunities limited and was loaned out; then leading to an announcement on 31 January 2012 that McNamee left Milton Keynes Dons by mutual consent.

=== Wycombe Wanderers ===
On 24 November 2011, in search of first team football, McNamee joined Wycombe Wanderers on a loan deal until 7 January 2012. The signing was manager Gary Waddock's second loan signing of the day after completing the deal for Marcello Trotta.

He made his debut for the 'Chairboys' on 10 December 2011, scoring a volley against relegation rivals Chesterfield in a 3–2 win. For his performance, McNamee was named League Two's Team of the Week. In a follow–up match, McNamee scored his second goal for the club, in a 2–2 draw against Carlisle United. He became a regular for the side in the first team until his loan spell at Wycombe Wanderers ended in January.

After being released by Milton Keynes Dons, McNamee re–joined Wycombe Wanderers on a free transfer for the rest of the season. McNamee's first game after signing for the club on a permanent basis came on 4 February 2012, coming on as a substitute in the 68th minute, in a 2–1 win over Tranmere Rovers. Having spent the rest of the 2011–12 season on the substitute bench, McNamee made fifteen appearances and scoring two times in all competitions. He was not offered a new deal by the club at the end of the season and was released.

=== Macclesfield Town ===
On 31 August 2012, he signed for Football Conference side Macclesfield Town on a free transfer.

McNamee made his Macclesfield Town debut, coming on as a substitute for Chris Holroyd, who scored a hat–trick earlier in the game, and two minutes later, assisted a goal that James Tunnicliffe scoring an own goal, in a 4–3 win over Stockport County on 4 September 2012. Two weeks later, on 22 September 2012, he set up another goal to score the club's only goal of the game, as Macclesfield Town lost 2–1 against Forest Green Rovers. By the time of his Macclesfield United's departure, McNamee went on to make five appearances for the side.

=== Aldershot Town ===
On 10 January 2013, it was announced that McNamee joined Aldershot Town on a short–term contract.

He made his Aldershot Town debut on 22 January 2013, coming on as a substitute in the 75th minute, in a 2–1 loss against Northampton Town. This turns out to be his only appearance for the club, as the club were relegated from League Two.

=== Woking ===
After leaving Macclesfield Town, McNamee went on trial at Woking. After spending three weeks with the club at the trial, he signed for Woking on a free transfer.

McNamee made his Woking debut, coming on as a substitute in the 72nd minute, in a 0–0 draw against Lincoln City in the opening game of the season. He then assisted a goal for Joe McNerney to score the club's second goal of the game, in a 4–2 loss against Welling United on 24 August 2013. It wasn't until on 17 September 2013 when McNamee assisted a goal for Kevin Betsy, who scored twice, in a 2–0 win over Hyde. However, McNamee's first team was soon reduced, as he found himself on the substitute bench or dropped from the squad for the rest of the season. At the end of the 2013–14 season, McNamee went on to make nineteen appearances for the side and was released by the club afterwards.

=== International career ===
McNamee was eligible to play for England and Jamaica.

In October 2002, McNamee was called up to the England U19 for the first time. He went on to make two appearances for England U19 side.

=== Management career ===
In July 2021, McNamee was appointed manager of Combined Counties League Division One side Enfield Borough, with former Queens Park Rangers defender Patrick Kanyuka named his assistant.

== Career statistics ==
As of 21 April 2014

Club	Season	League			FA Cup		League Cup		Other^{[A]}		Total	
Club	Season	Division	Apps	Goals	Apps	Goals	Apps	Goals	Apps	Goals	Apps	Goals
Watford	2001–02	Division One	7	1	0	0	0	0	0	0	7	1
Watford	2002–03	Division One	23	0	0	0	1	0	0	0	24	0
Watford	2003–04	Division One	2	0	0	0	0	0	0	0	2	0
Watford	2004–05	Championship	14	0	1	0	1	0	0	0	16	0
Watford	2005–06	Championship	38	1	1	0	3	0	0	0	42	1
Watford	2006–07	Premier League	7	0	2	1	1	0	0	0	10	1
Watford	2007–08	Championship	0	0	0	0	2	0	0	0	2	0
Barnet (loan)	2003–04	Conference	5	0	0	0	0	0	0	0	5	0
Crewe Alexandra (loan)	2006–07	League One	5	0	0	0	0	0	0	0	5	0
Watford Total			91	2	4	1	8	0	0	0	103	3
Swindon Town	2007–08	League One	19	2	0	0	0	0	0	0	19	2
Swindon Town	2008–09	League One	43	0	1	0	1	0	2	0	47	0
Swindon Town	2009–10	League One	17	1	1	0	2	0	2	1	22	2
Norwich City (loan)	2009–10	League One	2	0	0	0	0	0	0	0	2	0
Swindon Town Total			79	3	2	0	3	0	4	1	88	4
Norwich City	2009–10	League One	15	1	0	0	0	0	0	0	15	1
Norwich City	2010–11	Championship	17	0	1	0	2	0	0	0	20	0
Total			32	1	1	0	2	0	0	0	35	1
Milton Keynes Dons	2011–12	League One	7	0	0	0	1	0	0	0	8	0
Wycombe Wanderers (loan)	2011–12	League One	15	2	0	0	0	0	0	0	15	2
Milton Keynes Dons Total			7	0	0	0	1	0	0	0	8	0
Macclesfield Town	2012–13	Conference	4	0	1	0	0	0	0	0	5	0
Macclesfield Town Total			4	0	1	0	0	0	0	0	5	0
Aldershot Town	2012–13	League Two	1	0	0	0	0	0	0	0	1	0
Aldershot Town Total			1	0	0	0	0	0	0	0	1	0
Woking	2013–14	Conference	17	0	1	0	0	0	0	0	18	0
Woking Total			17	0	1	0	0	0	0	0	18	0
Career totals			258	8	9	1	14	0	4	1	287	10

A. The "Other" column constitutes appearances (including substitutes) and goals in the Football League Trophy.

== Personal life ==
McNamee is of Jamaican descent through his parents, making him eligible to play for the national side. McNamee is cousin to Bobby De Cordova-Reid, a fellow footballer whose clubs include Bristol City.

The club's manager Ray Lewington mentioned that McNamee has asthma in his questions and answers with the BBC. In October 2010, McNamee was in court, charged with a motoring offence. The following month, it was announced he had been found not guilty. In August 2011, McNamee provided bail to a teenager accused of taking part in the London riots.

After retiring from football, McNamee joined Chelsea's Futsal team and owns a football school.

== Honours ==
Norwich City

- Football League One: 2009–10
