= Scott Fitzgerald (footballer, born 1979) =

English footballer

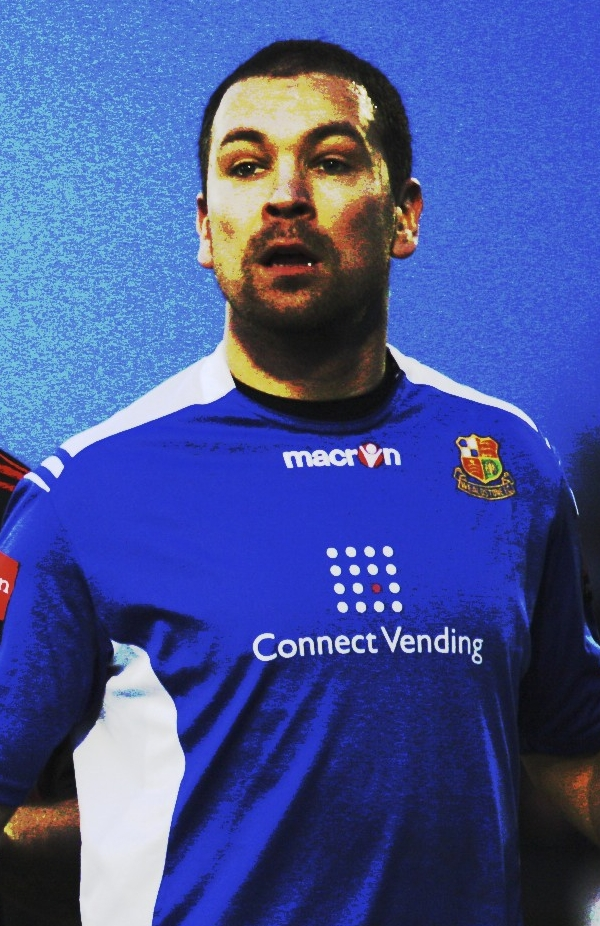
- Fitzgerald playing for Wealdstone in 2012.

Personal information
- Full name: Scott Paul Fitzgerald
- Date of birth: 18 November 1979 (age 46)
- Place of birth: Hillingdon, England
- Position: Striker

Youth career
- Brentford

Senior career*
Years	Team	Apps	(Gls)
1998–2003	Northwood	152	(74)
2003–2005	Watford	55	(11)
2004	→ Swansea (loan)	3	(0)
2005	→ Leyton Orient (loan)	1	(0)
2005–2007	Brentford	23	(5)
2005	→ Oxford United (loan)	3	(1)
2006	→ Walsall (loan)	5	(0)
2006–2007	→ AFC Wimbledon (loan)	14	(5)
2007–2008	Basingstoke Town	58	(12)
2008–2010	Hayes & Yeading United	70	(25)
2010–2012	Wealdstone	43	(31)
2011	→ Hemel Hempstead Town (loan)	?	(?)
2012–2014	Chalfont St Peter	57	(24)
Total		484	(188)
- * Club domestic league appearances and goals

Scott P. Fitzgerald (born 18 November 1979) is an English semi-professional footballer. He plays as a striker.

== Career ==
Fitzgerald joined the Brentford Centre of Excellence at age 12 and started his senior career in non-League football at Northwood before being signed by First Division side Watford in February 2003. He made his professional debut on 21 April 2003, coming on as a substitute for Michael Chopra in a home win over Derby County. In his first start for the club he scored his first goal, the second in a 2–0 win over Sheffield United on the final day of the season.

In the 2003–04 season he scored 11 goals to finish as the club's top scorer. At Watford Fitzgerald scored 11 goals in 29 league starts. He fell out of favour in the 2004–05 season, however, and he spent a goalless loan spell at Swansea. He returned to Watford and made several late substitute appearances towards the end of 2004, before being loaned to Leyton Orient in January 2005. On his only appearance for Orient, a home tie with Grimsby Town, he was sent off for violent conduct. He was loaned to Brentford in March 2005 and scored both goals in a 2–0 away win at Oldham Athletic in his second game for the club. He signed permanently later that month, on transfer deadline day.

He scored two further goals that season and featured as a substitute in the second leg of Brentford's play-off semi-final defeat to Sheffield Wednesday. In 2005–06 he was out of favour, and was loaned out to Oxford United, scoring once against Grimsby, and Walsall. After not scoring in five appearances with Walsall he was released from his five-month loan contract a month early in April 2006.

Fitzgerald was transfer-listed in July 2006 and then spent a month-long loan period at the start of the 2006–07 season at non-League club AFC Wimbledon, where he made five starts as short-term cover for injured strikers Richard Butler and Paul Barnes. He returned for a second loan spell in November 2006, making nine further league appearances, before returning to Brentford in January 2007.

On 15 January 2007, his contract with Brentford was terminated by mutual consent and Fitzgerald signed for Conference South side Basingstoke Town on a contract running initially until the end of the 2006–07 season. He made his debut for on 20 January 2007 in a 1–1 draw away at Yeading.

At the beginning of the 2008–09 season Fitzgerald moved to another Conference South side, Hayes & Yeading United.

In June 2010, he signed for Isthmian Premier League side Wealdstone and will be an important part of their quest to achieve promotion.

In August 2011, he made his debut for Hemel Hempstead Town, but rejoined Wealdstone soon after. He left Wealdstone in September 2012.

In October 2012, Fitzgerald joined Chalfont St Peter and netted two goals away against his former club Northwood in a 3–1 win on 2 October. After scoring two goals in his first six appearances, Fitzgerald underwent surgery on his troublesome knee injury which is set to keep him out for a while. Fitzgerald scored on his comeback from injury in a 5–1 win over Woodford United on 5 March 2013, and netted again – this time in a 5–2 defeat by Biggleswade Town – on 16 March 2013. He continued his excellent form with a brace against Aylesbury which took his tally to eight goals in just thirteen appearances.

Since leaving Chalfont St Peter in 2014, Fitzgerald has been without a club but in September 2015 stated his intention to carry on playing.
