= Jason Norville =

Trinidadian footballer (born 1983)

Personal information
- Date of birth: 9 September 1983 (age 43)
- Place of birth: Sangre Grande, Trinidad and Tobago
- Height: 5 ft 11 in (1.80 m)
- Position: Striker

Youth career
- Watford

Senior career*
Years	Team	Apps	(Gls)
2001–2005	Watford	13	(1)
2005–2008	Barnet	33	(3)
2007	→ Welwyn Garden City (loan)		
2007	→ Wealdstone (loan)	3	(0)
2008	Woking	16	(4)
2010	Dover Athletic	4	(1)
2010–2011	Bishop's Stortford	5	(2)

International career
2003	Trinidad and Tobago	1	(0)
- * Club domestic league appearances and goals

Jason Norville (born 9 September 1983) is a Trinidadian former professional footballer who played as a striker. He made one appearance for the Trinidad and Tobago national team in 2003.

== Career ==
Norville came up through Watford's academy, and made 14 league appearances and scored his first professional goal in a 2–2 draw with Sheffield Wednesday in March 2003.

He moved to Barnet on 29 July 2005. His time at Barnet was marked by injuries, which restricted him to only 28 appearances in two years. He was released by the club in May 2007 but re-joined the club on a non-contract basis just before the start of the new season, however this was not officially announced until 31 August, after he had played three games for Wealdstone on loan to gain match fitness. He quickly fell out of favour at Barnet in the 2007–08 season after some poor performances and in January 2008 joined Woking on a free transfer. He was released at the end of the season. Norville was out of football for two years before going on trial at Gillingham in summer 2010, and joined Dover Athletic later that year.
