= Paolo Vernazza =

English footballer

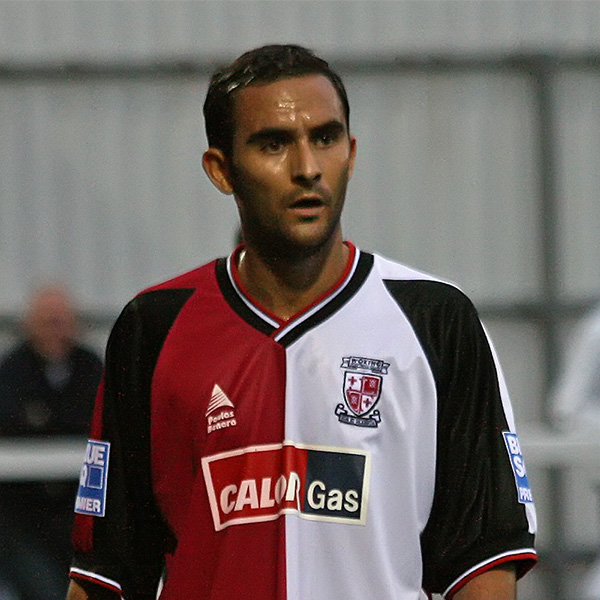
- Vernazza playing for Woking in 2008

Personal information
- Full name: Paolo Andrea Pietro Vernazza
- Date of birth: 1 November 1979 (age 46)
- Place of birth: Islington, England
- Position: Midfielder

Senior career*
Years	Team	Apps	(Gls)
1997–2000	Arsenal	4	(1)
1998	→ Ipswich Town (loan)	2	(0)
2000	→ Portsmouth (loan)	7	(0)
2000–2004	Watford	96	(2)
2004–2006	Rotherham United	27	(0)
2005–2006	→ Barnet (loan)	17	(0)
2006–2007	Dagenham & Redbridge	10	(0)
2007–2008	Weymouth	29	(1)
2008–2009	Woking	25	(1)
2009–2010	Grays Athletic	12	(0)
2010	Hemel Hempstead Town		
2010–2011	Bishop's Stortford		
Total		229	(5)

International career
	England U21	2	(0)
- * Club domestic league appearances and goals

Paolo Andrea Pietro Vernazza (born 1 November 1979) is an English former footballer who played as a midfielder.

== Career ==
Vernazza started his career at Arsenal but struggled to break into the first team. His development as a player may have been hampered by injuries sustained in an incident with a burglar in his home in 2001, in which Vernazza and fellow Arsenal trainee Andrew Douglas were both stabbed. He made his first-team debut in a League Cup match against Birmingham City on 14 October 1997. He only played one league game (against Crystal Palace) as Arsenal won the 1997–98 FA Premier League, meaning he didn't qualify for a winners' medal. His performances in Arsenal's reserves resulted in him gaining a place in the England squad for the 1999 FIFA World Youth Championship. He had loan spells at Ipswich Town and Portsmouth, before leaving Arsenal for Watford in December 2000. He played 11 times for Arsenal, scoring one goal, in a 2–1 win over Coventry City on 16 September 2000.

Vernazza spent three and a half years at Watford, making 96 league appearances, before moving to Rotherham United in the summer of 2004 on a free.

Paolo's time at Rotherham was largely unsuccessful, resulting in him spending a loan spell at Barnet before being released in May 2006.

Following a successful trial, Vernazza signed for Dagenham & Redbridge on 14 December 2006. He was part of the squad that helped Dagenham gain promotion to the Football League for the first time in the club's history, winning the Conference National in the 2006–07 season.

He joined Weymouth on 9 July 2007.

Vernazza appeared as a substitute for Crawley Town in a pre-season game against former club Arsenal on 26 July 2008. However, on 6 August 2008 he signed for another Conference club, Woking, following a successful trial.

On 4 September 2009, Vernazza signed for Grays Athletic, before leaving in February 2010. He joined Hemel Hempstead Town in March. In September 2010, he joined Bishop's Stortford.

He retired from football in 2011. He is now a player agent for various youth players.

== Honours ==
Arsenal

- FA Charity Shield: 1999
