= 1994–95 Preston North End F.C. season =

Preston North End's 1994-1995 season

Preston North End
1994–95 season
- Chairman: Bryan Gray
- Manager: John Beck (until December); Gary Peters (from December)
- Stadium: Deepdale
- Third Division: 5th
- FA Cup: Second round
- League Cup: First round
- Football League Trophy: First round
- Top goalscorer: League: Mike Conroy(10); All: Mike Conroy(11)
- Highest home attendance: 11,867 vs Carlisle United
- Lowest home attendance: 6,377 vs Colchester United
- Average home league attendance: 8,469

During the 1994–95 English football season, Preston North End F.C. competed in the Football League Third Division.

== Season summary ==
After eight seasons, Preston North End played their home games on grass after the plastic surface was removed over the summer.

After the previous season's heroics, Preston North End experienced a very bad period as they lost seven games in a row. Over this run, manager John Beck faced a lot of criticism over his long ball tactics, which eventually resulted in his resignation. Assistant Manager Gary Peters took charge and won his first four games.

The turnaround in form and change in tactics saw Preston move into play-off contention. In early March David Beckham signed on loan and played five matches, scoring twice, once from a freekick and once directly from a corner. Preston managed to secure a play off spot, however were unable to progress past the semi-finals, losing to Bury.

== Final league table ==
Pos	Team	Pld	W	D	L	GF	GA	GD	Pts	Promotion or relegation
3	Chesterfield (O, P)	42	23	12	7	62	37	+25	81	Qualification for the Third Division play-offs
4	Bury	42	23	11	8	73	36	+37	80	Qualification for the Third Division play-offs
5	Preston North End	42	19	10	13	58	41	+17	67	Qualification for the Third Division play-offs
6	Mansfield Town	42	18	11	13	84	59	+25	65	Qualification for the Third Division play-offs
7	Scunthorpe United	42	18	8	16	68	63	+5	62	

(O) Play-off winners; (P) Promoted

== Results ==
Preston North End's score comes first

=== Legend ===
Win	Draw	Loss

=== Football League Third Division ===
Date	Opponent	Venue	Result	Attendance	Scorers
13 August 1994	Darlington	A	0-0	3,800	
20 August 1994	Hereford United	A	2-0	3,309	Conroy, Sale
27 August 1994	Barnet	A	1-2	2,441	Sale
30 August 1994	Bury	A	0-0	3,623	
3 September 1994	Lincoln City	H	4-0	8,337	Moyes, Sale (2), Ainsworth
10 September 1994	Fulham	A	1-0	5,001	Trebble
13 September 1994	Gillingham	A	3-2	2,555	Sale 2, Fleming
17 September 1994	Darlington	H	1-3	8,884	Trebble
24 September 1994	Doncaster Rovers	A	1-2	3,321	Fleming
1 October 1994	Walsall	H	1-2	7,852	Whalley
8 October 1994	Scunthorpe United	H	0-1	6,895	
15 October 1994	Hartlepool United	A	1-3	2,002	Atkinson
22 October 1994	Colchester United	A	1-3	3,015	Trebble
29 October 1994	Exeter City	H	0-1	6,808	
5 November 1994	Mansfield Town	A	2-1	2,602	Conroy 2
19 November 1994	Northampton Town	H	2-0	7,297	Moyes, Raynor
26 November 1994	Chesterfield	A	0-1	3,191	
10 December 1994	Hereford United	H	4-2	6,581	Magee, Conroy, Bryson 2
17 December 1994	Barnet	H	1-0	6,429	Kidd
26 December 1994	Rochdale	H	3-0	10,491	Smart, Kidd, Conroy
31 December 1994	Scarborough	H	1-0	8,407	Smart
2 January 1995	Torquay United	A	0-1	3,770	
10 January 1995	Colchester United	H	2-1	6,337	Smart, Trebble
17 January 1995	Carlisle United	A	0-0	10,684	
21 January 1995	Mansfield Town	H	2-1	8,448	Bryson, Smart
24 January 1995	Wigan Athletic	A	1-1	3,618	Cartwright
4 February 1995	Chesterfield	H	0-0	8,544	
11 February 1995	Northampton Town	A	1-2	5,195	Smart
18 February 1995	Carlisle United	H	1-0	11,897	Conroy
28 February 1995	Walsall	A	2-2	4,492	Conroy, Raynor
4 March 1995	Doncaster Rovers	H	2-2	9,624	Davey, Beckham
11 March 1995	Fulham	H	3-2	8,601	Conroy, Raynor, Beckham
18 March 1995	Bury	H	5-0	9,626	Carmichael 2, Conroy 2, Moyes
21 March 1995	Exeter City	A	1-0	2,057	Bryson
25 March 1995	Lincoln City	A	1-1	5,487	Kidd
1 April 1995	Gillingham	H	1-1	9,100	Carmichael
8 April 1995	Scarborough	A	1-1	4,266	Bryson
15 April 1995	Wigan Athletic	H	1-0	10,238	Smart
17 April 1995	Rochdale	A	1-0	4,012	Davey
22 April 1995	Torquay United	H	0-1	9,173	
29 April 1995	Hartlepool United	H	3-0	9,129	Moyes, Holmes, Davey
6 May 1995	Scunthorpe United	A	1-2	3,691	Sale

=== Football League Playoffs ===
Date	Opponent	Venue	Result	Attendance	Scorers
14 May 1995	Bury	H	0-1	13,2971	
17 May 1995	Bury	A	0-1	9,094	

=== FA Cup ===
Round	Date	Opponent	Venue	Result	Attendance	Goalscorers
R1	14 November 1994	Blackpool	H	1-0	14,036	Conroy
R2	3 December 1994	Walsall	H	1-1	9,767	Smart
R2 Replay	13 December 1994	Walsall	A	0-4	6,468	

=== League Cup ===
Round	Date	Opponent	Venue	Result	Attendance	Goalscorers
R1 1st Leg	17 August 1994	Stockport County	H	1-1	2,385	Fensome
R1 2nd Leg	23 August 1994	Stockport County	A	1-4	5,450	Moyes

=== Football League Trophy ===
Round	Date	Opponent	Venue	Result	Attendance	Goalscorers
NR1	28 September 1994	Chester City	H	1-1	3,328	Trebble
NR1	9 November 1994	Bury	A	0-1	1,756	

== Statistics ==
=== Appearances and goals ===
No.	Pos	Nat	Player	Total		Division Three		FA Cup		EFL Cup		EFL Trophy	
No.	Pos	Nat	Player	Apps	Goals	Apps	Goals	Apps	Goals	Apps	Goals	Apps	Goals
	FW	(Scotland) SCO	Allan Smart	21	7	17 + 2	6	2	1	0	0	0	0
	DF	(England) ENG	Andy Fensome	49	1	42	0	3	0	2	1	2	0
	GK	(England) ENG	Barry Richardson	23	0	17	0	3	0	2	0	1	0
	GK	(England) ENG	David Lucas	0	0	0	0	0	0	0	0	0	0
	DF	(Scotland) SCO	David Moyes	45	5	38	4	3	0	2	1	2	0
	MF	(England) ENG	Gareth Ainsworth	19	1	16	1	1	0	1	0	1	0
	MF	(England) ENG	Graeme Atkinson	15	1	8 + 7	1	0	0	0	0	0	0
	FW	(England) ENG	Graham Lancashire	17	0	9 + 8	0	0	0	0	0	0	0
	MF	(Scotland) SCO	Ian Bryson	48	5	41	5	3	0	1 + 1	0	2	0
	DF	(England) ENG	Jamie Squires	12	0	11	0	0	0	0	0	1	0
	GK	(England) ENG	John Vaughan	27	0	25 + 1	0	0	0	0	0	1	0
	MF	(Scotland) SCO	Kevin Magee	14	1	14	1	0	0	0	0	0	0
	MF	(England) ENG	Lee Cartwright	43	1	25 + 11	1	3	0	2	0	1 + 1	0
	FW	(England) ENG	Mark Sale	18	6	10 + 3	6	0 + 1	0	1 + 1	0	2	0
	DF	(England) ENG	Matt Carmichael	10	3	7 + 3	3	0	0	0	0	0	0
	FW	(Scotland) SCO	Mike Conroy	30	11	22 + 3	10	3	1	1 + 1	0	0	0
	FW	(England) ENG	Mickey Brown	0	0	0	0	0	0	0	0	0	0
	FW	(England) ENG	Neil Trebble	25	5	8 + 11	4	2 + 1	0	1	0	2	1
	MF	(England) ENG	Neil Whalley	21	1	14 + 1	1	1 + 1	0	2	0	1 + 1	0
	MF	(England) ENG	Paul Raynor	45	3	34 + 4	3	3	0	1 + 1	0	2	0
	DF	(Scotland) SCO	Ray Sharp	25	0	21	0	3	0	0	0	1	0
	DF	(England) ENG	Ryan Kidd	35	3	32	3	0	0	2	0	1	0
	MF	(Wales) WAL	Simon Davey	13	3	13	3	0	0	0	0	0	0
	DF	(England) ENG	Stuart Hicks	10	0	8	0	0	0	2	0	0	0
	MF	(England) ENG	Terry Fleming	32	2	20 + 7	2	0 + 1	0	2	0	1 + 1	0
Player(s) who featured whilst on loan but returned to parent club during the season:
	MF	(England) ENG	David Beckham	5	2	4 + 1	2	0	0	0	0	0	0
	FW	(England) ENG	Stuart Rimmer	2	0	0 + 2	0	0	0	0	0	0	0
Player(s) who left during the season:
	MF	(England) ENG	Dean Emerson	4	0	1 + 1	0	0 + 2	0	0	0	0	0
Player(s) out on loan:
	DF	(England) ENG	Steve Holmes	9	1	5	1	3	0	0	0	1	0

== Awards and Nominations ==
=== Club Awards ===
Award	Player	Notes	Ref.
Player of the Year	(England) Andy Fensome		
