= 1998–99 Watford F.C. season =

English football team season

Watford
1998–99 season
- Chairman: Elton John
- Manager: Graham Taylor
- Stadium: Vicarage Road
- Football League First Division: 5th (promoted)
- Play-offs: Winners
- FA Cup: Third round
- League Cup: First round
- Top goalscorer: Noel-Williams (10)
- Average home league attendance: 11,822

During the 1998–99 English football season, Watford F.C. competed in the Football League First Division.

== Season summary ==
In the 1998–99 season, Watford's second successive promotion was achieved with a 2–0 victory over Bolton Wanderers in the playoff final, securing the club's promotion to the top flight for the first time since 1988.

== Final league table ==
Pos	Team	Pld	W	D	L	GF	GA	GD	Pts	Qualification or relegation
3	Ipswich Town	46	26	8	12	69	32	+37	86	Qualification for the First Division play-offs
4	Birmingham City	46	23	12	11	66	37	+29	81	Qualification for the First Division play-offs
5	Watford (O, P)	46	21	14	11	65	56	+9	77	Qualification for the First Division play-offs
6	Bolton Wanderers	46	20	16	10	78	59	+19	76	Qualification for the First Division play-offs
7	Wolverhampton Wanderers	46	19	16	11	64	43	+21	73	

Rules for classification: 1) Points; 2) Goals scored; 3) Goal difference
(O) Play-off winners; (P) Promoted

== Results ==
Watford's score comes first

=== Legend ===
Win	Draw	Loss

=== Football League First Division ===
Date	Opponent	Venue	Result	Attendance	Scorers
8 August 1998	Portsmouth	A	2–1	15,275	Thomson (own goal), Lee
15 August 1998	Bradford City	H	1–0	10,731	Ngonge
22 August 1998	Bristol City	A	4–1	13,063	Johnson (2), Yates, Hazan
25 August 1998	Sunderland	A	1–4	36,587	Smart
28 August 1998	Wolverhampton Wanderers	H	0–2	12,016	
8 September 1998	Huddersfield Town	A	0–2	9,811	
12 September 1998	Queens Park Rangers	H	2–1	14,251	Millen, Smart
19 September 1998	Swindon Town	A	4–1	8,781	Smart (2), Wright, Hazan
26 September 1998	Ipswich Town	H	1–0	13,109	Kennedy (pen)
29 September 1998	Sheffield United	H	1–1	9,090	Noel-Williams
4 October 1998	West Bromwich Albion	A	1–4	11,840	Kennedy (pen)
10 October 1998	Birmingham City	H	1–1	10,096	Rowett (own goal)
17 October 1998	Tranmere Rovers	A	2–3	6,753	Smart, Noel-Williams
20 October 1998	Bolton Wanderers	A	2–1	15,921	Noel-Williams, Kennedy (pen)
24 October 1998	Port Vale	H	2–2	8,750	Guðmundsson (2)
31 October 1998	Bury	A	3–1	4,342	Bazeley, Ngonge, Smart
3 November 1998	Norwich City	H	1–1	10,011	Jackson (own goal)
7 November 1998	Oxford United	H	2–0	10,137	Palmer, Noel-Williams
14 November 1998	Stockport County	A	1–1	8,019	Johnson
21 November 1998	Crewe Alexandra	H	4–2	9,405	Noel-Williams (2), Bazeley, Wright
28 November 1998	Crystal Palace	A	2–2	19,521	Wright, Kennedy
5 December 1998	Barnsley	H	0–0	10,165	
12 December 1998	Stockport County	H	4–2	9,250	Johnson, Wright, Noel-Williams (2)
19 December 1998	Grimsby Town	A	1–2	6,679	Noel-Williams
26 December 1998	Bristol City	H	1–0	15,081	Smart
29 December 1998	Norwich City	A	1–1	19,255	Palmer
9 January 1999	Portsmouth	H	0–0	12,057	
16 January 1999	Wolverhampton Wanderers	A	0–0	23,408	
23 January 1999	West Bromwich Albion	H	0–2	11,664	
30 January 1999	Sunderland	H	2–1	20,188	Wright, Noel-Williams
6 February 1999	Bradford City	A	0–2	14,142	
16 February 1999	Huddersfield Town	H	1–1	10,303	Mooney
20 February 1999	Queens Park Rangers	A	2–1	14,918	Wright, Smith
26 February 1999	Swindon Town	H	0–1	8,692	
2 March 1999	Ipswich Town	A	2–3	18,818	Smith, Mooney
6 March 1999	Sheffield United	A	0–3	15,943	
13 March 1999	Oxford United	A	0–0	8,137	
20 March 1999	Bury	H	0–0	9,336	
3 April 1999	Tranmere Rovers	H	2–1	8,682	Kennedy, Ngonge
5 April 1999	Birmingham City	A	2–1	24,877	Mooney, Daley
10 April 1999	Bolton Wanderers	H	2–0	13,001	Hyde, Mooney
17 April 1999	Crewe Alexandra	A	1–0	5,461	Mooney
24 April 1999	Crystal Palace	H	2–1	15,590	Hyde, Mooney
27 April 1999	Port Vale	A	2–1	7,126	Mooney (2)
1 May 1999	Barnsley	A	2–2	17,098	Ngonge, Mooney
9 May 1999	Grimsby Town	H	1–0	20,303	Kennedy

=== First Division play-offs ===
Round	Date	Opponent	Venue	Result	Attendance	Goalscorers
SF 1st Leg	16 May 1999	Birmingham City	H	1–0	18,535	Ngonge
SF 2nd Leg	20 May 1999	Birmingham City	A	0–1 (won 7–6 on pens)	29,100	
F	31 May 1999	Bolton Wanderers	N	2–0	70,343	Wright, Smart

=== FA Cup ===
Round	Date	Opponent	Venue	Result	Attendance	Goalscorers
R3	2 January 1999	Tottenham Hotspur	A	2–5	36,022	Johnson, Kennedy

=== League Cup ===
Round	Date	Opponent	Venue	Result	Attendance	Goalscorers
R1 1st Leg	11 August 1998	Cambridge United	A	0–1	3,073	
R1 2nd Leg	18 August 1998	Cambridge United	H	1–1 (lost 1–2 on agg)	6,817	Ngonge

== Players ==
=== First-team squad ===
Squad at end of season

Note: Flags indicate national team as defined under FIFA eligibility rules; some limited exceptions apply. Players may hold more than one non-FIFA nationality.

No.	Pos.	Nation	Player
—	GK	ENG	Alec Chamberlain
—	GK	ENG	Chris Day
—	DF	ENG	Darren Bazeley
—	DF	ENG	Clint Easton
—	DF	ENG	Nigel Gibbs
—	DF	ENG	Colin Miles
—	DF	ENG	Keith Millen
—	DF	ENG	Steve Palmer
—	DF	ENG	David Perpetuini
—	DF	ENG	Paul Robinson
—	DF	ENG	Darren Ward
—	DF	ENG	Dean Yates
—	DF	WAL	Rob Page (captain)
—	DF	NGA	Benedict Iroha
—	MF	ENG	Tony Daley
—	MF	ENG	Micah Hyde (Note: Hyde was born in Newham, England, but also qualified to represent Jamaica internationally and would make his international debut for Jamaica in 2001.)

No.	Pos.	Nation	Player
—	MF	ENG	Stuart Slater
—	MF	ENG	Tommy Smith
—	MF	NIR	Peter Kennedy
—	MF	FRA	Alexandre Bonnot (on loan from Angers)
—	MF	ISL	Jóhann Guðmundsson
—	MF	ISR	Alon Hazan
—	MF	AUS	Richard Johnson
—	FW	ENG	Jason Lee
—	FW	ENG	Tommy Mooney
—	FW	ENG	Gifton Noel-Williams
—	FW	ENG	Guy Whittingham (on loan from Sheffield Wednesday)
—	FW	ENG	Nick Wright
—	FW	SCO	Allan Smart
—	FW	ISR	Ronny Rosenthal
—	FW	COD	Michel Ngonge (Note: Ngonge was born in Huy, Belgium, but also qualified to represent the Democratic Republic of the Congo internationally and made his international debut for the Democratic Republic of the Congo in 1995.)
