= 2009–10 Stoke City F.C. season =

Stoke City
2009–10 season
- Chairman: Peter Coates
- Manager: Tony Pulis
- Stadium: Britannia Stadium
- Premier League: 11th (47 Points)
- FA Cup: Quarter Final
- League Cup: Fourth Round
- Top goalscorer: League: Matthew Etherington (5); All: Ricardo Fuller (8)
- Highest home attendance: 27,604 vs Hull City (3 April 2010)
- Lowest home attendance: 26,728 vs Wigan Athletic (12 December 2009)
- Average home league attendance: 27,162
Home colours	Away colours

The 2009–10 season was Stoke City's second season in the Premier League and the 54th in the top tier of English football.

After a successful first season in the Premier League, Stoke were looking to establish themselves in the top tier and spent just over £20 million on Diego Arismendi, Danny Collins, Robert Huth, Tuncay and Dean Whitehead. Stoke began the season with victories over Burnley, Sunderland, and West Ham United, and a 1–0 win at Tottenham Hotspur in October. Their form dropped off in December as they managed just a point and two goals in five matches.

Stoke began 2010 in fine form, going eleven matches unbeaten, which included wins against Fulham, Blackburn Rovers and Portsmouth, whilst draws were earned against Liverpool and Manchester City. The run also included FA Cup wins against York City, Arsenal and Manchester City before City lost to Chelsea at the quarter-final stage. Stoke had no relegation battle to be concerned with and finished the campaign in 11th position with 47 points.

== Pre-season ==
Stoke began their preparation for the 2009–10 season with two Stoke XIs playing matches simultaneously against local non-league sides Newcastle Town and Nantwich Town. Both matches were surprisingly lost, 2–1 at Newcastle and 2–0 at Nantwich. Stoke then spent a week at a training camp in Austria where they played twice. Firstly against German side St Pauli in Irdning, Dave Kitson scoring in a 3–1 defeat. The other match was against Israeli side Hapoel Tel Aviv where Stoke had to play in a green strip due to a colour clash, Salif Diao scored Stoke's goal in a 1–1 draw, a lob from 40-yards. On their return to England, Stoke completed the signing of Sunderland midfielder Dean Whitehead for a fee of £5 million. Two goals from Neil Mellor saw Preston North End beat Stoke 2–1 with Richard Cresswell scoring for the Potters against his former employers.

Stoke then played back-to-back games against East Midlands opposition. Firstly, they drew 1–1 at Nottingham Forest on 29 July, with Dave Kitson cancelling out a strike from Nathan Tyson. Then, against Derby County, despite taking the lead twice via Liam Lawrence and Ricardo Fuller goals from Stephen Pearson and Arnaud Mendy earned Derby a 2–2 draw. Stoke's final match of pre-season was against Spanish side Real Valladolid at the Britannia Stadium, where they made a bright start, scoring through Abdoulaye Faye after two minutes before Dave Kitson converted a 32nd-minute penalty. However, goals from Borja and Alberto Bueno saw that match end in a 2–2 draw and leave Stoke without a victory in pre-season. On 14 October 2009, a Stoke City XI lost 1–0 in a friendly against American sister club Austin Aztex at Nantwich Town's Weaver Stadium.

Match	Date	Opponent	Venue	Result	Attendance	Scorers	Report
1	12 July 2009	Newcastle Town	A	1–2	3,317	Etherington 37'	Report
2	12 July 2009	Nantwich Town	A	0–2	784		Report
3	17 July 2009	St Pauli	A	1–3		Kitson 72'	Report
4	21 July 2009	Hapoel Tel Aviv	A	1–1		Diao 33'	Report
5	25 July 2009	Preston North End	A	1–2	3,121	Cresswell 78'	Report
6	29 July 2009	Nottingham Forest	A	1–1	5,542	Kitson 48'	Report
7	1 August 2009	Derby County	A	2–2	23,259	Lawrence 7', Fuller 65'	Report
8	7 August 2009	Real Valladolid	H	2–2	9,465	Faye 2', Kitson (pen) 32'	Report
9	14 October 2009	Austin Aztex	H	0–1	554		Report

== Premier League ==
=== August ===
For the season opener against newly promoted Burnley, Stoke gave new signing Dean Whitehead his debut. The Clarets started brightly and went close early on through Robbie Blake. However, City soon took control of the match and went in front after 19 minutes through Ryan Shawcross, before a trademark Rory Delap long throw-in was glanced into his own net by defender Stephen Jordan to put Stoke into a 2–0 lead. The away side improved in the second half but failed to trouble Sørensen and Stoke could have added a third, with Dave Kitson hitting the post and Richard Cresswell narrowly shooting wide.

Stoke travelled to Liverpool for the first of three away games back-to-back. Stoke lined up in a defensive 4–5–1 formation in an attempt to stop the threat of Liverpool's attacking full-backs. The change in tactics backfired as Liverpool comfortably won the game 4–0, with the goals coming from Fernando Torres, Dirk Kuyt, Glen Johnson and David Ngog.

Another newly promoted side were the next opponents for Stoke in the form of Birmingham City at St Andrew's. Stoke suffered an early blow as James Beattie was forced to come off due to injury, meaning that Dave Kitson would have a chance to impress. There were few chances during the match, with both sides cancelling each other out, and the match finished 0–0.

New signings from Middlesbrough, Robert Huth and Tuncay, were on the bench for the visit of Steve Bruce's Sunderland at the end of August. Stoke opened the scoring just before half-time through a goalmouth scramble which Kitson managed to score past Craig Gordon. Both sides continued to create chances in the second half but Stoke were the stronger of the two teams and were able to see out the win.

=== September ===
For the visit of Chelsea, Pulis decided to play a 5–3–2 formation with new signing Danny Collins making his debut. Stoke suffered an early setback as James Beattie was again forced to come off after falling awkwardly. Stoke took the lead after 32 minutes after a mix-up in the Chelsea defence allowed captain Abdoulaye Faye to head into an empty net. Stoke were dealt another injury, this time keeper Sørensen, who was replaced by Steve Simonsen. Chelsea equalised in stoppage time in the first half through a goal by Didier Drogba. Chelsea dominated the second half without troubling Simonsen and it looked as though it would finish all level. but Florent Malouda gave Chelsea the three points deep into injury time to leave Stoke with a sense of déjà vu as Chelsea beat them in similar fashion last season.

Stoke then made the trip to the Reebok Stadium looking to avenge last season's 3–1 defeat in what was City's first game in the Premier League. Stoke were the better side in the first half as they dominated possession and created a number of half chances; Bolton on the other hand were awful and were booed off at half-time by their supporters. Stoke took the lead early in the second half through Kitson, Wanderers then brought on Ricardo Gardner and Ivan Klasnić to try and rescue a point for the home side. They did get a draw via the penalty spot after Danny Collins carelessly tripped Sam Ricketts in the final minute.

Following the epic 4–3 League Cup win over Blackpool, Stoke faced the league champions, Manchester United. Pulis decided to go with the same formation and system he used against Chelsea, however the change didn't work as the visitors were able to claim a comfortable 2–0 win.

=== October ===
Stoke reverted to their usual formation for the trip to Everton and gave a surprise start to Salif Diao after the midfielder's injury. Everton were the better team in the first 45 minutes without troubling Sørensen. Stoke improved in the second period and took the lead through Robert Huth's powerful header, his first goal for the club. The lead didn't last long as Leon Osman scored from long range and the match ended all square.

The next match was against Gianfranco Zola's West Ham United at the Britannia Stadium. James Beattie scored twice for Stoke in a 2–1 win. The first came via the penalty spot after Etherington had been brought down in the area by Julien Faubert. West Ham levelled through a Matthew Upson header before Beattie tapped in from close range following good work by Fuller. Huth was given a retrospective three-match ban by the FA after video footage showed him hitting Upson in the face.

Stoke then made the trip to White Hart Lane to face Tottenham and were handed a blow before kick-off with Thomas Sørensen unable to play, meaning that number two Steve Simonsen started in goal. Tottenham were also hit by injuries, with Jonathan Woodgate being forced off after 14 minutes. Tottenham dominated the match and had numerous chances to open the scoring, but they were repeatedly denied by Simonsen. With the match looking to be heading to a goalless draw, Stoke scored via a counter-attack with Glenn Whelan curling a shot past Heurelho Gomes to secure a 1–0 victory.

In the match against local rivals Wolverhampton Wanderers, Stoke dominated the first half and scored through Beattie, and a volley by Matthew Etherington, his first league goal for the club, put Stoke 2–0 up before half-time. In the second half, Wolves were the dominant side and also scored twice with two identical goals from former City player Jody Craddock as the match ended in a 2–2 draw.

=== November ===
Stoke made the trip to Hull looking for a second consecutive away win; despite a slow start City took the lead through Etherington's powerful drive past Matt Duke. Stoke could have extended their lead through Shawcross but his header clipped the crossbar. Hull then equalised through former City player Seyi Olofinjana and Stoke were on the back foot even more when Abdoulaye Faye was sent off for two bookable offences, meaning Tuncay, who had just come on, had to be replaced by Wilkinson in order to fill the gap in defence. Jan Vennegoor of Hesselink scored in the final minute to condemn Stoke to a disappointing defeat.

Paul Hart's relegation threatened Portsmouth were next to arrive in Staffordshire and had the chance to take the lead early on after Delap had fouled Aruna Dindane, but Kevin-Prince Boateng's penalty was saved by Sørensen. It turned out to be a very poor game and Stoke scored the only goal through a well-worked move resulting in Fuller scoring his first goal of the season.

Stoke travelled to Blackburn and had a number of chances to win the match with Whitehead and Beattie both missing from just 5 yards; Blackburn were also guilty of poor finishing and the match ended in a 0–0 draw.

=== December ===
The first match in December came away against Arsenal; Stoke started the match brightly and looked comfortable, but Delap again gave away a penalty after fouling Andrey Arshavin in the area, but Sørensen saved Cesc Fàbregas' spot kick. However, Arsenal were not to be denied and went on to win the match 2–0 with goals from Arshavin and Aaron Ramsey. The result was, however, overshadowed by media reports of a dressing room argument between Pulis and Beattie.

Stoke then faced Wigan Athletic in an early kick-off at the Britannia Stadium it what turned out to be an entertaining match. Wigan took the lead in confusing circumstances; Emmerson Boyce headed the ball past Sørensen taking out the keeper in the process, and Salif Diao unavoidably kicked Boyce in the head, and after lengthy treatment the referee belatedly awarded the goal. Stoke equalised through Tuncay's first goal for the club just before half-time. Wigan went back in front via a 50-yard strike by Maynor Figueroa, but Stoke scored instantly through a Shawcross header. Wigan had the chance to win the match in the final minute when Huth was adjudged to have fouled Jordi Gómez despite the Wigan player being offside, but Sørensen saved Hugo Rodallega's spot kick.

City travelled to Villa Park and thought they had taken the lead when Sidibé out-jumped Stephen Warnock, but referee Lee Probert gave a free-kick to Villa. Stoke were the better side and created a number of chances to score but were unable to find the net. Villa claimed all three points when John Carew headed past Sørensen.

The Boxing Day fixture saw Stoke make the trip to Manchester City, where Roberto Mancini was taking his first game in charge for the home side. His new side made a bright start, and two goals from Martin Petrov and Carlos Tevez gave Man City a 2–0 win.

City ended 2009 on a disappointing note as they were defeated 1–0 by Birmingham City at home. Stoke were the dominant team throughout the match and only some top-class saves from Joe Hart kept Stoke out. Birmingham took advantage through a scrappy goal from Cameron Jerome.

=== January ===
The first league match of 2010 was the re-arranged fixture against Fulham; the match went ahead despite heavy snow. Sorensen failed to recover from an injury he picked up in the win over York City at the weekend, meaning that Simonsen started and youngster Danzelle St Louis-Hamilton appeared on the bench. Stoke controlled the first half and Fulham the second. Stoke opened the scoring 13 minutes when Tuncay met Robert Huth's flick on from Etherington's corner and powered the ball beyond Mark Schwarzer from 3-yards to put the hosts into the lead. A rampant City side didn't have to wait long to double their advantage though as skipper Faye was on hand to tap the ball into an empty net after Etherington's deep corner evaded a packed out 6-yard box. The majority of the Britannia Stadium had barely recovered from their celebrations by the time Sidibé had fired the Potters into a three-goal lead just three minutes later. The Malian international striker latched onto Higginbotham's clever flick on, as the Potters laid siege to the Fulham penalty area, and smashed the ball into the roof of the net with a clinically taken half volley to put Stoke into a 3–0 lead. In the second half Fulham scored twice through Damien Duff and Clint Dempsey.

A weak Liverpool side were next to arrive at the Britannia and were content to sit back and play for a draw. Stoke suffered an early injury problems with both Abdoualye Faye and Rory Delap being forced to come off. Liverpool took a surprise lead through Greek defender Sotirios Kyrgiakos in the second half, Stoke then applied intense pressure on the Liverpool goal and in the 90th minute Robert Huth scrambled in the equaliser.

=== February ===
After five home games in a row City finally had an away game at Sunderland. However the match was a very disappointing affair and finished in a poor 0–0 draw.

Stoke were back at home for the visit of Blackburn Rovers on a day dedicated to Sir Stanley Matthews. Stoke produced a fitting performance to mark the 10th anniversary of the death of the wizard of dribble by producing arguably City's best performance in the top flight since winning promotion in May 2008. Stoke opened their account through Danny Higginbotham after eight minutes with the left back volleying an Etherington corner. City made it two just before half time after Mama Sidibé tapped in from close range and Etherington finished of a man of the match outing by skilfully beating Robinson to make the score line 3–0, Stoke's largest Premier League win and biggest top flight win since 1984. After the match it was reported that a visiting Blackburn Rovers supporter had died at the match. His death was later ruled as 'misadventure' by the coroner after eyewitnesses stated that he had 'headed' a 25lb bin.

In the next away game at the DW Stadium Wigan made a bright start and took the lead through Paul Scharner after 14 minutes. Stoke improved greatly in the second half and equalised via a header from Tuncay and the match finished one apiece.

Following the FA Cup draw against Man City at the weekend, they were again the opposition this time at the Britannia Stadium in the League. Stoke made a confident start dominating the match and should have opened the scoring in the first half but the scores were level at half time. Stoke were reduced to ten men early in the second half when Abdoulaye Faye brought down Adebayor, Man City then took control but Stoke surprisingly took the lead through a volley from Glenn Whelan. Man City drew level via a scrappy goal from Gareth Barry, City thought they won the match with seconds left when Shawcross headed in a Delap throw in but Alan Wiley wrongly disallowed the goal.

Stoke then made the long trip south to face relegation bound Portsmouth at Fratton Park. Pompey were the better side in the first half and took the lead through the Frédéric Piquionne after 35 minutes. Stoke were better in the second half and Robert Huth levelled just after the half time break before Andy Wilkinson was sent off for a second bookable offence. With Pompey looking for a vital winner City snatched the win right at the death with Salif Diao scoring his first goal in seven years.

Following Stoke's FA Cup replay win over Man City at the Britannia, Arsenal were next to arrive and City took the lead through Danny Pugh via another Delap throw in, however Nicklas Bendtner equalised just before half time. In the second half Shawcross was sent-off for a tackle on Aaron Ramsey, which left the Arsenal midfielder with a broken leg. Arsenal made full use of their numerical advantage with goals from Cesc Fàbregas and Thomas Vermaelen.

=== March ===
After their FA Cup exit at Chelsea, Stoke faced struggling Burnley in the re-arranged match at Turf Moor. The match was a keenly contested affair and the result was a fair 1–1 draw with goals from Tuncay and Dave Nugent.

Stoke then had a hard-fought goalless draw with Aston Villa at the Britannia Stadium and both sides could have easily won the match.

Following a lethargic opening 45 minutes against Tottenham Hotspur the second half exploded into action as Eiður Guðjohnsen fired the visitors ahead just 30 seconds after the interval, before Dean Whitehead was dismissed by referee Mike Dean three minutes later for an innocuous looking challenge on Luka Modrić. The Potters had to stand firm to soak up some heavy Spurs' pressure, but managed to pull themselves back into the game on the hour mark when Etherington calmly converted from the penalty spot, after David Kitson had been dragged to the ground by Benoît Assou-Ekotto. Ricardo Fuller then spurned a glorious opportunity to turn the game on its head as he blazed over from 6-yards, before the Londoners ensured all three points would be theirs with little over ten minutes remaining as Croatian international Niko Kranjčar lashed home after Assou-Ekotto teed him up.

Stoke then made the trip to West Ham and came away with all three points thanks to a piece of individual piece of brilliance from substitute Ricardo Fuller. He had only been on the pitch two minutes by the time he beat two men and rifled the ball beyond Robert Green with little over twenty minutes of the game remaining. Prior to his introduction chances had been few and far between for both sides, with Egyptian Mido going closest for the Hammers, whilst Liam Lawrence had spurned the visitors best chance early on after blazing over from 12-yards. The Potters had to soak up a late onslaught from the desperate hosts, but they managed to hold on for all three points and elevate themselves up to tenth place in the league table; moving to within one point of the magic '40-point target'.

=== April ===
Relegation threatened Hull were next at the Britannia Stadium and Stoke came away with a comfortable 2–0 win. Fuller struck in the sixth minute to give the Potters a flying start against Iain Dowie's men before Liam Lawrence slotted home the second in the final minute to ease his side to the three points.

There was great excitement for highly awaited derby against Wolverhampton Wanderers at Molineux prior to the match, however the game was a total anti-climax and finished in a drab 0–0 draw.

City's penultimate home match saw Bolton Wanderers make the short trip south. Stoke dominated the match for 80 minutes and took the lead through Dave Kitson after 13 minutes. However Matthew Taylor somehow managed to score twice in the final few minutes to condemn Stoke to a surprise defeat.

In the next away match at Chelsea Stoke suffered early setbacks with both Faye and Sorensen being taken off injured. Everything seemed to go wrong for Stoke and Chelsea scored seven goals without reply.

=== May ===
In the final home match of the season Stoke picked up a well-earned point against in-form Everton. Neither side were able to find a breakthrough throughout the clash as Delap missed City's best opportunity in the second half whilst the Toffees thought they had won it through Phil Jagielka, only for Howard Webb to chalk it off for an infringement by Victor Anichebe late on.

Stoke's penultimate game of the season was against UEFA Europa League finalists Fulham at Craven Cottage. Stoke won the match 1–0 with Matthew Etherington scoring the only goal in the 83rd minute.

Stoke finished off the 2009–10 season with a 4–0 loss against Manchester United at Old Trafford.

=== Results ===
Match	Date	Opponent	Venue	Result	Attendance	Scorers	Report
1	15 August 2009	Burnley	H	2–0	27,385	Shawcross 19', Jordan (o.g.) 33'	Report
2	19 August 2009	Liverpool	A	0–4	44,318		Report
3	22 August 2009	Birmingham City	A	0–0	21,694		Report
4	29 August 2009	Sunderland	H	1–0	27,091	Kitson 43'	Report
5	12 September 2009	Chelsea	H	1–2	27,440	Faye 32'	Report
6	19 September 2009	Bolton Wanderers	A	1–1	20,265	Kitson 53'	Report
7	26 September 2009	Manchester United	H	0–2	27,500		Report
8	4 October 2009	Everton	A	1–1	36,753	Huth 50'	Report
9	17 October 2009	West Ham United	H	2–1	27,026	Beattie (2) 11' (pen), 69'	Report
10	24 October 2009	Tottenham Hotspur	A	1–0	36,031	Whelan 86'	Report
11	31 October 2009	Wolverhampton Wanderers	H	2–2	27,500	Beattie 17', Etherington 44'	Report
12	8 November 2009	Hull City	A	1–2	24,516	Etherington 29'	Report
13	22 November 2009	Portsmouth	H	1–0	27,069	Fuller 74'	Report
14	28 November 2009	Blackburn Rovers	A	0–0	25,147		Report
15	5 December 2009	Arsenal	A	0–2	60,041		Report
16	12 December 2009	Wigan Athletic	H	2–2	26,728	Tuncay 37', Shawcross 74'	Report
17	19 December 2009	Aston Villa	A	0–1	35,852		Report
18	26 December 2009	Manchester City	A	0–2	47,325		Report
19	28 December 2009	Birmingham City	H	0–1	27,211		Report
20	5 January 2010	Fulham	H	3–2	25,104	Tuncay 12', Faye 34', Sidibé 37'	Report
21	16 January 2010	Liverpool	H	1–1	27,247	Huth 90'	Report
22	1 February 2010	Sunderland	A	0–0	35,078		Report
23	6 February 2010	Blackburn Rovers	H	3–0	27,386	Higginbotham 8', Sidibé 45+2', Etherington 67'	Report
24	9 February 2010	Wigan Athletic	A	1–1	16,033	Tuncay 74'	Report
25	16 February 2010	Manchester City	H	1–1	26,778	Whelan 72'	Report
26	20 February 2010	Portsmouth	A	2–1	17,208	Huth 50', Diao 90+2'	Report
27	27 February 2010	Arsenal	H	1–3	27,011	Pugh 8'	Report
28	10 March 2010	Burnley	A	1–1	20,323	Tuncay 23'	Report
29	13 March 2010	Aston Villa	H	0–0	27,598		Report
30	20 March 2010	Tottenham Hotspur	H	1–2	27,575	Etherington 64' (pen)	Report
31	27 March 2010	West Ham United	A	1–0	34,564	Fuller 69'	Report
32	3 April 2010	Hull City	H	2–0	27,604	Fuller 6', Lawrence 90'	Report
33	11 April 2010	Wolverhampton Wanderers	A	0–0	28,455		Report
34	17 April 2010	Bolton Wanderers	H	1–2	27,250	Kitson 13'	Report
35	25 April 2010	Chelsea	A	0–7	41,013		Report
36	1 May 2010	Everton	H	0–0	27,579		Report
37	5 May 2010	Fulham	A	1–0	20,831	Etherington 83'	Report
38	9 May 2010	Manchester United	A	0–4	75,316		Report

=== Final league table ===
Pos	Team	Pld	W	D	L	GF	GA	GD	Pts
9	Birmingham City	38	13	11	14	38	47	−9	50
10	Blackburn Rovers	38	13	11	14	41	55	−14	50
11	Stoke City	38	11	14	13	34	48	−14	47
12	Fulham	38	12	10	16	39	46	−7	46
13	Sunderland	38	11	11	16	48	56	−8	44

Source: Barclays Premier League

== FA Cup ==
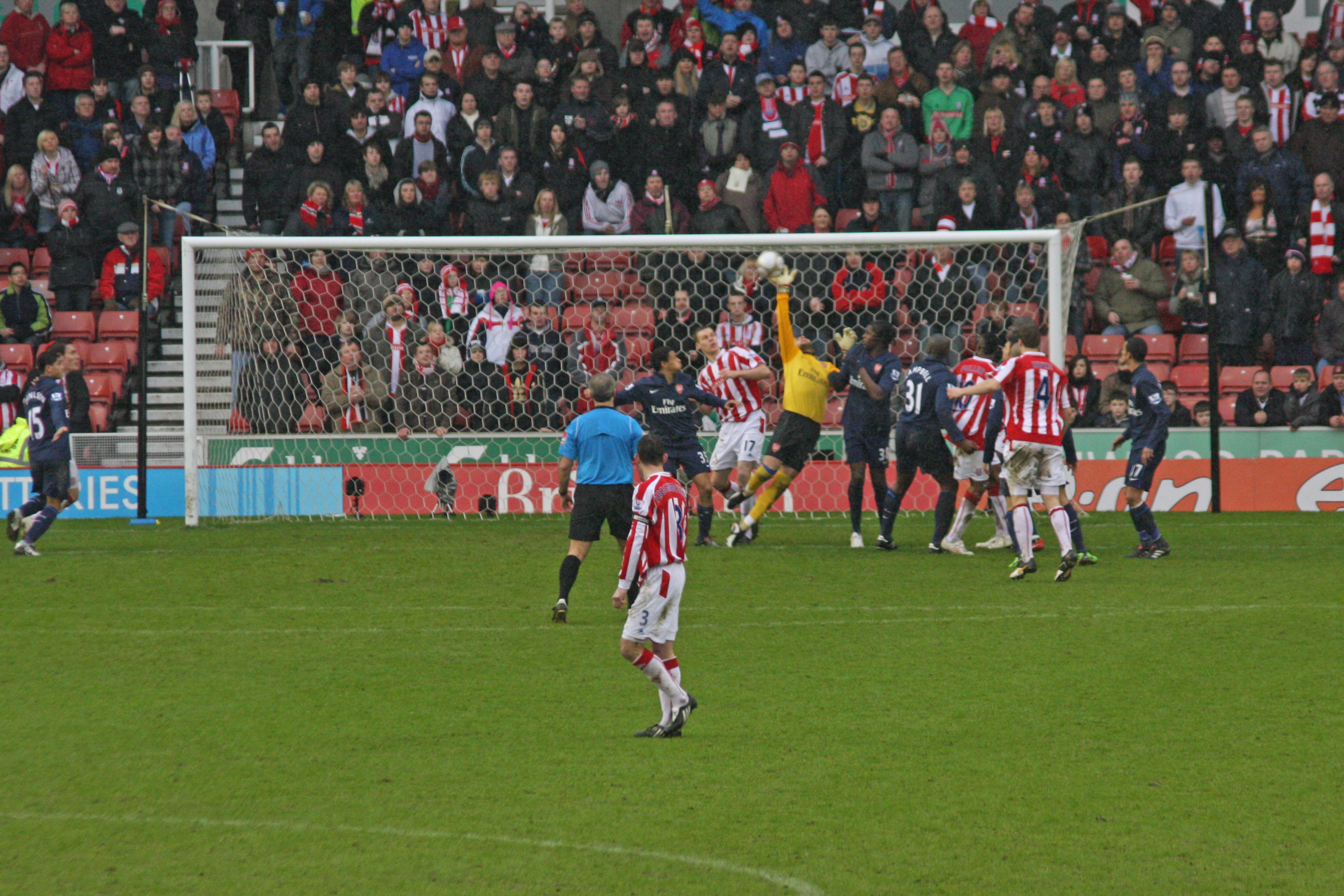
Stoke v Arsenal (24 January 2010)

Stoke were drawn at home to Conference Premier side York City in the third round of the FA Cup. The non-league side started the better side despite arriving late for kick-off and took a shock lead through Neil Barrett. However, Stoke quickly turned the game around with two Rory Delap throws which led to Daniel Parslow putting through his own net and Ricardo Fuller scoring a minute later. Stoke sealed their place in the fourth round when Matthew Etherington curled in a free-kick just before the hour mark.

Arsenal were the next opponents for City and they made the perfect start; another Rory Delap throw caused panic in the Arsenal penalty area and Fuller took advantage. Arsenal slowly came back into the game and equalised through a fortunate deflected Denílson free-kick just before half-time. In the second half both sides were attacking and after 78 minutes Fuller, got his second of the game heading in a cross from Mamady Sidibé. Dean Whitehead then got his first goal for Stoke confirming a fifth round tie.

Stoke were handed a tough test against Manchester City in the fifth round. At a surprisingly sparse City of Manchester Stadium, Man City took an early lead after Shaun Wright-Phillips took advantage of some awful Stoke defending. Stoke struggled in the first half and their cause was not helped by injuries to Matthew Etherington and his replacement Liam Lawrence. In the second half Stoke became more threatening and the equaliser came after 57 minutes after a Rory Delap throw-in was headed in by Fuller. Both sides could have won afterwards but it finished 1–1, meaning that a replay would be needed.

In the replay Man City made a fast start, putting the Stoke defence under a considerable amount of pressure with Emmanuel Adebayor, Craig Bellamy and Pablo Zabaleta all missing good chances. In the second half, it was Stoke who began to take control of the match and took the lead through Dave Kitson ten minutes from full-time. However, Bellamy equalised moments later, sending the tie into extra time. Man City were reduced to ten men when Adebayor was shown a red card after an altercation with Shawcross. Stoke retook the lead through a Shawcross header from a Delap throw-in and then Tuncay finished the game with a fine solo goal.

Stoke made it into the quarter final of the FA Cup for the first time since 1971 and were drawn away at the holders and favourites, Chelsea. Stoke made a good start, almost taking the lead through Dean Whitehead after ten minutes. This was as good as it got for City as Chelsea produced a commanding display and took their place in the semi-final with goals from Frank Lampard and John Terry.

Round	Date	Opponent	Venue	Result	Attendance	Scorers	Report
R3	2 January 2010	York City	H	3–1	15,586	Parslow 24' (o.g.), Fuller 25', Etherington 58'	Report
R4	24 January 2010	Arsenal	H	3–1	19,735	Fuller (2) 2', 78', Whitehead 85'	Report
R5	13 February 2010	Manchester City	A	1–1	28,019	Fuller 57'	Report
R5 Replay	24 February 2010	Manchester City	H	3–1 (aet)	21,813	Kitson 79', Shawcross 95', Tuncay 99'	Report
Quarter Final	7 March 2010	Chelsea	A	0–2	41,322		Report

== League Cup ==
Stoke started their League Cup campaign away to Leyton Orient. It was the first time the two sides had met in the League Cup and the first time since 1993. Stoke made 11 changes to the side that drew 0–0 with Birmingham City as manager Tony Pulis kept with his normal League Cup side. Ryan Shotton made his first Stoke start and on the bench a number of youngsters such as Dave Parton and Matthew Lund appeared for the first time. In the first half Orient had the best chance when Adrian Pătulea should have scored but failed. Richard Cresswell should have done the same before Dave Kitson headed against the bar. With both teams failing to break the deadlock the match went into extra time. The winning goal came from Kitson; a brilliant 35-yard strike, his first in Stoke colours, sent City to the third round to play Blackpool.

In the third round against Blackpool, two of Stoke's summer signings, Diego Arismendi and Tuncay, made their first starts. Blackpool scored the game's opening goal just before half-time when ex-Crewe player David Vaughan was allowed to run and shoot to put the Tangerines in front. It got worse for City as after half-time Billy Clarke, one of the smallest players on the pitch managed to outjump a static Stoke defence and put Blackpool 2–0 up. That goal seemed to lift Stoke as they went all out to get back in the game. Alex Baptiste fouled Tuncay in the area and Liam Lawrence took the spot kick, which was easily saved by Matthew Gilks. Higginbotham pulled one back before Etherington scored his first goal for Stoke. Fuller and Tuncay combined to put Stoke in front; however, minutes later Ben Burgess made it 3–3 and it looked like it was going to extra time before Andy Griffin sealed a 4–3 win for Stoke.

In the fourth round, Stoke were handed an unwanted trip to Portsmouth. Stoke took the decision to fly to the south coast to avoid the long journey. It didn't have the desired effect, as Portsmouth, with the help of some poor Stoke defending, easily won the match 4–0. It didn't get any better as, on the flight back, the aircraft had to make an emergency landing due to an oil leak.

Round	Date	Opponent	Venue	Result	Attendance	Scorers	Report
R2	26 August 2009	Leyton Orient	A	1–0 (aet)	2,742	Kitson 94'	Report
R3	22 September 2009	Blackpool	H	4–3	13,957	Higginbotham 75', Etherington 78', Fuller 80', Griffin 90+6'	Report
R4	27 October 2009	Portsmouth	A	0–4	11,251		Report

== Squad statistics ==
No.	Pos.	Name	League		FA Cup		League Cup		Total		Discipline	
No.	Pos.	Name	Apps	Goals	Apps	Goals	Apps	Goals	Apps	Goals	Yellow card	Red card
1	GK	(England) Steve Simonsen	2(1)	0	0(1)	0	3	0	5(2)	0	0	0
2	DF	(England) Andy Griffin	0	0	0	0	2(1)	1	2(1)	1	0	0
3	DF	(England) Danny Higginbotham	23(1)	1	3	0	2	1	28(1)	2	0	0
4	DF	(Germany) Robert Huth	30(2)	3	5	0	0	0	35(2)	3	8	0
5	DF	(England) Leon Cort	0	0	1	0	3	0	4	0	1	0
6	MF	(Republic of Ireland) Glenn Whelan	25(8)	2	4	0	1	0	30(8)	2	9	0
7	MF	(Republic of Ireland) Liam Lawrence	14(11)	1	2(2)	0	2	0	18(13)	1	0	0
8	MF	(England) Tom Soares	0	0	0	0	2(1)	0	2(1)	0	0	0
9	FW	(England) James Beattie	11(11)	3	1	0	1	0	13(11)	3	0	0
10	FW	(Jamaica) Ricardo Fuller	22(13)	3	5	4	0(1)	1	27(14)	8	10	0
11	FW	(Mali) Mamady Sidibé	19(5)	2	4(1)	0	0(1)	0	23(7)	2	1	0
12	FW	(England) Dave Kitson	10(8)	3	0(2)	1	2	1	12(10)	5	0	0
14	MF	(England) Danny Pugh	1(6)	1	0(3)	0	3	0	4(9)	1	1	0
15	MF	(Senegal) Salif Diao	11(5)	1	2(1)	0	0	0	13(6)	1	7	0
16	FW	(England) Richard Cresswell	1(1)	0	0	0	1	0	2(1)	0	0	0
17	DF	(England) Ryan Shawcross	27(1)	2	3	1	0	0	30(1)	3	9	1
18	MF	(England) Dean Whitehead	33(3)	0	4	1	0	0	37(3)	1	7	1
19	MF	(Senegal) Amdy Faye	0	0	0	0	1	0	1	0	0	0
20	FW	(Turkey) Tuncay	13(17)	4	2(3)	1	2	0	17(20)	5	2	0
21	DF	(England) Andrew Davies	0	0	0	0	0(1)	0	0(1)	0	0	0
22	DF	(Senegal) Ibrahima Sonko	0	0	0	0	1	0	1	0	0	0
22	DF	(Wales) Danny Collins	22(3)	0	4(1)	0	0	0	26(4)	0	0	0
23	MF	(England) Michael Tonge	0	0	0	0	2(1)	0	2(1)	0	1	0
24	MF	(Republic of Ireland) Rory Delap	34(2)	0	4(1)	0	0	0	38(3)	0	4	0
25	DF	(Senegal) Abdoulaye Faye (c)	30(1)	2	1	0	0	0	31(1)	2	5	2
26	MF	(England) Matthew Etherington	33(1)	5	3	1	0(1)	1	36(2)	7	1	0
27	GK	(Bosnia and Herzegovina) Asmir Begović	3(1)	0	0	0	0	0	3(1)	0	0	0
28	DF	(England) Andy Wilkinson	21(4)	0	2	0	1	0	24(4)	0	6	1
29	GK	(Denmark) Thomas Sørensen	33	0	5	0	0	0	38	0	0	0
30	DF	(England) Ryan Shotton	0	0	0	0	1	0	1	0	0	0
31	DF	(England) Carl Dickinson	0	0	0	0	1	0	1	0	0	0
32	MF	(Uruguay) Diego Arismendi	0	0	0	0	2	0	2	0	0	0
35	FW	(England) Ben Marshall	0	0	0	0	0	0	0	0	0	0
36	MF	(England) Matthew Lund	0	0	0	0	0	0	0	0	0	0
37	MF	(England) Nathaniel Wedderburn	0	0	0	0	0	0	0	0	0	0
38	GK	(England) Danzelle St Louis-Hamilton	0	0	0	0	0	0	0	0	0	0
42	FW	(England) Louis Moult	0(1)	0	0	0	0(2)	0	0(3)	0	1	0
43	GK	(England) Dave Parton	0	0	0	0	0	0	0	0	0	0
44	MF	(Republic of Ireland) Ryan Connor	0	0	0	0	0	0	0	0	0	0
–	–	Own goals	–	1	–	1	–	0	–	2	–	–

== Transfers ==
=== In ===
Date	Pos.	Name	From	Fee	Ref.
7 July 2009	MF	(England) Ben Marshall	(England) Crewe Alexandra	Compensation	
7 July 2009	MF	(England) Matthew Lund	(England) Crewe Alexandra	Compensation	
24 July 2009	MF	(England) Dean Whitehead	(England) Sunderland	£5 Million	
27 August 2009	DF	(Germany) Robert Huth	(England) Middlesbrough	£5 Million	
28 August 2009	FW	(Turkey) Tuncay	(England) Middlesbrough	£5 Million	
31 August 2009	MF	(Uruguay) Diego Arismendi	(Uruguay) Club Nacional de Football	£2.5 Million	
1 September 2009	DF	(Wales) Danny Collins	(England) Sunderland	£2.75 Million	
1 February 2010	GK	(Bosnia and Herzegovina) Asmir Begović	(England) Portsmouth	£3.25 Million	

=== Out ===
Date	Pos.	Name	To	Fee	Ref.
2 June 2009	FW	(France) Vincent Péricard	(England) Carlisle United	Free	
2 June 2009	FW	(England) Marc Grocott	(England) Unattached	Released	
2 June 2009	MF	(England) Tom Thorley	(England) Stafford Rangers	Free	
2 June 2009	MF	(England) Jimmy Phillips	(England) Burton Albion	Free	
6 August 2009	MF	(Nigeria) Seyi Olofinjana	(England) Hull City	£3 Million	
5 January 2010	FW	(England) Richard Cresswell	(England) Sheffield United	Undisclosed	
27 January 2010	DF	(England) Leon Cort	(England) Burnley	£1.5 Million	

=== Loan out ===
Date from	Date to	Pos.	Name	To	Ref.
29 July 2009	1 January 2010	GK	(England) Danzelle St Louis Hamilton	(England) Vauxhall Motors	
7 August 2009	7 November 2009	MF	(England) Ben Marshall	(England) Northampton Town	
1 September 2009	30 June 2010	DF	(Senegal) Ibrahima Sonko	(England) Hull City	
18 September 2009	18 October 2009	DF	(England) Andrew Davies	(England) Sheffield United	
23 September 2009	30 June 2010	DF	(England) Carl Dickinson	(England) Barnsley	
23 September 2009	30 June 2010	DF	(England) Ryan Shotton	(England) Barnsley	
29 September 2009	1 January 2010	FW	(England) Richard Cresswell	(England) Sheffield United	
13 November 2009	1 January 2010	MF	(England) Ben Marshall	(England) Cheltenham Town	
17 November 2009	1 January 2010	FW	(England) Dave Kitson	(England) Middlesbrough	
19 November 2009	19 December 2009	MF	(England) Michael Tonge	(England) Preston North End	
26 November 2009	26 December 2009	MF	(England) Nathaniel Wedderburn	(England) Hereford United	
26 November 2009	30 June 2010	MF	(England) Tom Soares	(England) Sheffield Wednesday	
12 January 2010	30 June 2010	DF	(England) Andy Griffin	(England) Reading	
1 February 2010	30 June 2010	MF	(England) Ben Marshall	(England) Carlisle United	
1 February 2010	30 June 2010	MF	(England) Michael Tonge	(England) Derby County	
2 March 2010	30 June 2010	MF	(Uruguay) Diego Arismendi	(England) Brighton & Hove Albion	
19 March 2010	30 June 2010	GK	(England) Steve Simonsen	(England) Sheffield United	
