= 1998–99 Derby County F.C. season =

Derby County
1998–99 season
- Chairman: Lionel Pickering
- Manager: Jim Smith
- Stadium: Pride Park
- FA Premier League: 8th
- FA Cup: Quarter-finals
- League Cup: Third round
- Top goalscorer: League: Wanchope/Burton (9); All: Burton (12)
- Highest home attendance: 32,913 (vs. Liverpool, 13 March)
- Lowest home attendance: 21,037 (vs. Wimbledon, 22 August)
- Average home league attendance: 29,193

The 1998–99 English football season was Derby County F.C.'s third consecutive season in the Premier League.

== Season summary ==
Derby's second tilt at European football was made in the 1998–99 season, the Rams peaking in 2nd place after 6 games with a 2–0 home win over Leicester City, eventually finishing one place better off in 8th. They reached the FA Cup Quarter finals for the third time in seven years, losing out only to late Nwankwo Kanu goal in a 0–1 away defeat to Arsenal, and recorded some memorable victories, including a league double over Liverpool 2–1 at Anfield and 3–2 at Pride Park and a 1–0 win over Nottingham Forest in the teams' first ever meeting at Pride Park. Derby County were a club on the up; Pride Park's capacity was expanded (32,913 fans attended the 3–2 victory over Liverpool) and Derby's players were getting noticed – five had represented their countries at the 1998 World Cup, and Christian Dailly was sold to Blackburn Rovers for £5.35m, comfortably the highest fee Derby had ever received. The key departure, however, was Steve McClaren – Smith's number two since he had taken the Derby managerial position 3 years earlier – who departed in February 1999 to become Sir Alex Ferguson's assistant at Manchester United, winning the treble in his first 3 months at Old Trafford. The 1998–99 season was Jim Smith's Derby County peak, as the financial demands of Premier League football began to catch up with them.

== Final league table ==
Pos	Team	Pld	W	D	L	GF	GA	GD	Pts
6	Aston Villa	38	15	10	13	51	46	+5	55
7	Liverpool	38	15	9	14	68	49	+19	54
8	Derby County	38	13	13	12	40	45	−5	52
9	Middlesbrough	38	12	15	11	48	54	−6	51
10	Leicester City	38	12	13	13	40	46	−6	49

Source: Premier League
Rules for classification: 1) points; 2) goal difference; 3) number of goals scored.

Results summary

Overall								Home						Away					
Pld	W	D	L	GF	GA	GD	Pts	W	D	L	GF	GA	GD	W	D	L	GF	GA	GD
38	13	13	12	40	45	−5	52	8	7	4	22	19	+3	5	6	8	18	26	−8

Source: 1998-99 FA Premier League table

Results by round

Round	1	2	3	4	5	6	7	8	9	10	11	12	13	14	15	16	17	18	19	20	21	22	23	24	25	26	27	28	29	30	31	32	33	34	35	36	37	38
Ground	A	H	A	H	A	H	A	H	A	H	H	A	A	H	A	H	H	A	A	H	A	H	A	A	H	H	A	H	H	A	H	H	A	H	A	A	H	A
Result	D	D	D	W	W	W	L	L	L	D	D	W	D	L	W	D	D	D	D	W	L	W	W	L	W	L	D	W	W	L	L	W	L	D	L	W	D	L
Position	9	12	13	6	4	2	2	4	10	10	10	5	8	11	8	10	9	12	11	11	11	10	8	8	6	7	8	6	6	7	7	7	8	8	9	9	7	8

Source: 11v11.com: 1998-99 Derby County results
A = Away; H = Home; W = Win; D = Draw; L = Loss

== Results ==
Derby County's score comes first

=== Legend ===
Win	Draw	Loss

=== FA Premier League ===
Date	Opponent	Venue	Result	Attendance	Scorers
15 August 1998	Blackburn Rovers	A	0–0	24,007	
22 August 1998	Wimbledon	H	0–0	21,037	
29 August 1998	Middlesbrough	A	1–1	34,121	Wanchope
9 September 1998	Sheffield Wednesday	H	1–0	26,209	Sturridge
12 September 1998	Charlton Athletic	A	2–1	19,516	Wanchope, Baiano
19 September 1998	Leicester City	H	2–0	26,738	Schnoor, Wanchope
26 September 1998	Aston Villa	A	0–1	38,007	
3 October 1998	Tottenham Hotspur	H	0–1	30,083	
17 October 1998	Newcastle United	A	1–2	36,750	Burton
24 October 1998	Manchester United	H	1–1	30,867	Burton
31 October 1998	Leeds United	H	2–2	27,034	Schnoor (pen), Sturridge
7 November 1998	Liverpool	A	2–1	44,020	Harper, Wanchope
16 November 1998	Nottingham Forest	A	2–2	24,014	Dorigo (pen), Carbonari
22 November 1998	West Ham United	H	0–2	31,366	
28 November 1998	Southampton	A	1–0	14,762	Carbonari
5 December 1998	Arsenal	H	0–0	29,018	
12 December 1998	Chelsea	H	2–2	29,056	Carbonari, Sturridge
19 December 1998	Coventry City	A	1–1	16,627	Carsley
26 December 1998	Everton	A	0–0	39,206	
28 December 1998	Middlesbrough	H	2–1	21,083	Sturridge, Hunt
9 January 1999	Wimbledon	A	1–2	12,732	Wanchope
16 January 1999	Blackburn Rovers	H	1–0	27,386	Burton
30 January 1999	Sheffield Wednesday	A	1–0	24,440	Prior
3 February 1999	Manchester United	A	0–1	55,174	
7 February 1999	Everton	H	2–1	27,603	Burton (2)
20 February 1999	Charlton Athletic	H	0–2	27,853	
27 February 1999	Tottenham Hotspur	A	1–1	35,392	Burton
10 March 1999	Aston Villa	H	2–1	26,836	Baiano, Burton
13 March 1999	Liverpool	H	3–2	32,913	Burton, Wanchope (2)
20 March 1999	Leeds United	A	1–4	38,971	Baiano (pen)
3 April 1999	Newcastle United	H	3–4	32,039	Burton, Baiano (pen), Wanchope
10 April 1999	Nottingham Forest	H	1–0	32,217	Carbonari
17 April 1999	West Ham United	A	1–5	25,485	Wanchope
24 April 1999	Southampton	H	0–0	26,557	
2 May 1999	Arsenal	A	0–1	37,323	
5 May 1999	Leicester City	A	2–1	20,535	Sturridge, Beck
8 May 1999	Coventry City	H	0–0	32,450	
16 May 1999	Chelsea	A	1–2	35,016	Carbonari

=== FA Cup ===
Round	Date	Opponent	Venue	Result	Attendance	Goalscorers
R3	2 January 1999	Plymouth Argyle	A	3–0	16,730	Burton (2), Eranio (pen)
R4	23 January 1999	Swansea City	A	1–0	11,383	Harper
R5	13 February 1999	Huddersfield Town	A	2–2	22,129	Burton, Dorigo (pen)
R5R	24 February 1999	Huddersfield Town	H	3–1	28,704	Dorigo, Baiano (2)
QF	6 March 1999	Arsenal	A	0–1	38,046	

=== League Cup ===
Round	Date	Opponent	Venue	Result	Attendance	Goalscorers
R2 1st Leg	16 September 1998	Manchester City	H	1–1	22,986	Delap
R2 2nd Leg	23 September 1998	Manchester City	A	1–0 (won 2–1 on agg)	19,622	Wanchope
R3	28 October 1998	Arsenal	H	1–2	25,621	Sturridge

== Players ==
=== First-team squad ===
Squad at end of season

Note: Flags indicate national team as defined under FIFA eligibility rules; some limited exceptions apply. Players may hold more than one non-FIFA nationality.

No.	Pos.	Nation	Player
1	GK	(England) ENG	Russell Hoult
2	DF	(Argentina) ARG	Horacio Carbonari
3	DF	(Germany) GER	Stefan Schnoor
4	MF	(Jamaica) JAM	Darryl Powell (Note: Powell was born in Lambeth, England, but also qualified to represent Jamaica internationally and made his international debut for Jamaica in 1998.)
5	DF	(England) ENG	Tony Dorigo (Note: Dorigo was born in Adelaide, Australia, but also qualified to represent England internationally after obtaining citizenship and made his international debut for England in 1989.)
6	DF	(Croatia) CRO	Igor Štimac
7	MF	(Republic of Ireland) IRL	Brian Launders
8	FW	(England) ENG	Dean Sturridge
9	FW	(Costa Rica) CRC	Paulo Wanchope
10	MF	(Republic of Ireland) IRL	Rory Delap (Note: Delap was born in Sutton Coldfield, England, but also qualified to represent the Republic of Ireland internationally through his parents and represented them at U-21 level before making his international debut for the Republic of Ireland in March 1998.)
11	MF	(Scotland) SCO	Kevin Harper (Note: Harper was born in Oldham, England, but also qualified to represent Scotland internationally and represented them at U-21 level.)
12	FW	(England) ENG	Malcolm Christie
14	MF	(Norway) NOR	Lars Bohinen
15	MF	(England) ENG	Marc Bridge-Wilkinson

No.	Pos.	Nation	Player
16	DF	(Denmark) DEN	Jacob Laursen
17	DF	(England) ENG	Spencer Prior
18	DF	(England) ENG	Richard Jackson
19	DF	(England) ENG	Steve Elliott
20	MF	(Italy) ITA	Stefano Eranio
21	GK	(Estonia) EST	Mart Poom
22	DF	(Greece) GRE	Vassilios Borbokis
23	MF	(England) ENG	Paul Boertien
24	FW	(Jamaica) JAM	Deon Burton (Note: Burton was born in Reading, England, but also qualified to represent Jamaica internationally and made his international debut for Jamaica in September 1997.)
25	FW	(Denmark) DEN	Mikkel Beck
26	FW	(England) ENG	Marvin Robinson
27	FW	(Italy) ITA	Francesco Baiano
28	MF	(England) ENG	Adam Murray
29	GK	(England) ENG	Richard Knight

=== Left club during season ===
Note: Flags indicate national team as defined under FIFA eligibility rules; some limited exceptions apply. Players may hold more than one non-FIFA nationality.

No.	Pos.	Nation	Player
18	MF	(Republic of Ireland) IRL	Lee Carsley (Note: Carsley was born in Birmingham, England, but also qualified to represent the Republic of Ireland internationally through his grandmother and represented them at U-21 and B level before making his international debut for Ireland in October 1997.) (to Blackburn Rovers)
22	DF	(Scotland) SCO	Christian Dailly (to Blackburn Rovers)

No.	Pos.	Nation	Player
25	DF	(England) ENG	Rob Kozluk (to Sheffield United)
26	MF	(England) ENG	Jonathan Hunt (to Sheffield United)

=== Reserve squad ===
Note: Flags indicate national team as defined under FIFA eligibility rules; some limited exceptions apply. Players may hold more than one non-FIFA nationality.

No.	Pos.	Nation	Player
—	GK	(Republic of Ireland) IRL	Gerard Doherty
—	DF	(England) ENG	Ian Evatt

No.	Pos.	Nation	Player
—	DF	(England) ENG	Chris Riggott

== Transfers ==
=== In ===
Date	Pos.	Name	From	Fee
23 June 1998	DF	Stefan Schnoor	Hamburger SV	Free transfer
21 August 1998	DF	Spencer Prior	Leicester City	£700,000
10 September 1998	MF	Kevin Harper	Hibernian	£300,000
19 September 1998	MF	Brian Launders	BV Veendam	Free transfer
16 October 1998	DF	Tony Dorigo	Torino	Monthly contract
28 October 1998	FW	Malcolm Christie	Nuneaton Borough	£50,000
19 February 1999	GK	Gerard Doherty	Derry City	£20,000
12 March 1999	DF	Vassilios Borbokis	Sheffield United	£500,000
24 March 1999	DF	Richard Jackson	Scarborough	£30,000
25 March 1999	MF	Paul Boertien	Carlisle United	£250,000
25 March 1999	MF	Mikkel Beck	Middlesbrough	£500,000
18 May 1999	MF	Seth Johnson	Crewe Alexandra	£3,000,000

=== Out ===
Date	Pos.	Name	To	Fee
22 June 1998	DF	Chris Powell	Charlton Athletic	£800,000
13 July 1998	DF	Dean Yates	Watford	Free transfer
15 July 1998	MF	Robin van der Laan	Barnsley	£325,000
13 August 1998	DF	Gary Rowett	Birmingham City	£1,000,000
21 August 1998	DF	Christian Dailly	Blackburn Rovers	£5,300,000
12 March 1999	DF	Rob Kozluk	Sheffield United	Swap
12 March 1999	MF	Jonathan Hunt	Sheffield United	Swap
22 March 1999	MF	Lee Carsley	Blackburn Rovers	£3,400,000
28 May 1999	MF	Brian Launders	Colchester United	Signed

Transfers in: ▼£5,350,000
Transfers out: ▲£10,825,000
Total spending: ▲£5,475,000

== Statistics ==
=== Appearances, goals and cards ===
(Starting appearances + substitute appearances)

No.	Pos.	Name	League		FA Cup		League Cup		Total		Discipline	
No.	Pos.	Name	Apps	Goals	Apps	Goals	Apps	Goals	Apps	Goals	Yellow card	Red card
1	GK	(England) Russell Hoult	23	0	3	0	0	0	26	0	2	1
2	DF	(Argentina) Horacio Carbonari	28+1	5	4	0	0	0	32+1	5	4	0
3	DF	(Germany) Stefan Schnoor	20+3	2	3	0	2	0	25+3	2	9	0
4	MF	(Jamaica) Darryl Powell	30+3	0	1+1	0	3	0	34+4	0	10	0
5	DF	(England) Tony Dorigo	17+1	1	3	2	1	0	21+1	3	3	0
6	DF	(Croatia) Igor Štimac	14	0	3	0	1	0	18	0	6	0
7	MF	(Republic of Ireland) Brian Launders	0+1	0	0	0	0	0	0+1	0	0	0
8	FW	(England) Dean Sturridge	23+6	5	4	0	3	1	30+6	6	6	1
9	FW	(Costa Rica) Paulo Wanchope	33+2	9	2	0	2+1	1	37+3	10	9	1
10	MF	(Republic of Ireland) Rory Delap	21+2	0	0+1	0	3	1	24+3	1	5	0
11	MF	(Scotland) Kevin Harper	6+21	1	0+3	1	0+3	0	6+27	2	1	0
12	FW	(England) Malcolm Christie	0+2	0	0	0	0	0	0+2	0	0	0
14	MF	(Norway) Lars Bohinen	29+3	0	3	0	0	0	32+3	0	6	0
15	MF	(England) Marc Bridge-Wilkinson	0+1	0	0	0	0	0	0+1	0	0	0
16	DF	(Denmark) Jacob Laursen	37	0	4	0	3	0	44	0	7	0
17	DF	(England) Spencer Prior	33+1	1	4	0	2	0	39+1	1	4	0
18	MF	(Republic of Ireland) Lee Carsley	20+2	1	5	0	2+1	0	27+3	1	7	0
19	DF	(England) Steve Elliott	7+4	0	1+1	0	1+1	0	9+6	0	3	0
20	MF	(Italy) Stefano Eranio	18+7	0	4	1	2	0	24+7	1	4	0
21	GK	(Estonia) Mart Poom	15+2	0	2	0	3	0	20+2	0	0	0
22	DF	(Greece) Vassilios Borbokis	3+1	0	0	0	0	0	3+1	0	0	0
22	DF	(Scotland) Christian Dailly	1	0	0	0	0	0	1	0	0	0
23	DF	(England) Paul Boertien	0+1	0	0	0	0	0	0+1	0	0	0
24	FW	(Jamaica) Deon Burton	14+7	9	5	3	1	0	20+7	12	5	0
25	FW	(Denmark) Mikkel Beck	6+1	1	0	0	0	0	6+1	1	0	0
25	DF	(England) Rob Kozluk	3+4	0	1+1	0	1	0	5+5	0	1	0
26	MF	(England) Jonathan Hunt	0+6	1	0+3	0	0	0	0+9	1	1	0
26	FW	(England) Marvin Robinson	0+1	0	0	0	0	0	0+1	0	0	0
27	FW	(Italy) Francesco Baiano	17+5	4	3	2	3	0	23+5	6	3	0
28	MF	(England) Adam Murray	0+4	0	0	0	0	0	0+4	0	1	0
29	GK	(England) Richard Knight	0	0	0	0	0	0	0	0	0	0

=== Starting 11 ===
Considering starts in all competitions

- GK: #1, (England) Russell Hoult, 26
- RB: #3, (Germany) Stefan Schnoor, 25
- CB: #17, (England) Spencer Prior, 39
- CB: #2, (Argentina) Horacio Carbonari, 32
- LB: #16, (Denmark) Jacob Laursen, 44
- CM: #18, (Republic of Ireland) Lee Carsley, 27
- CM: #4, (Jamaica) Darryl Powell, 34
- CM: #14, (Norway) Lars Bohinen, 32
- RF: #20, (Italy) Stefano Eranio, 24 (Rory Delap has 24 starts as a right midfielder)
- CF: #8, (England) Dean Sturridge, 30
- LF: #9, (Costa Rica) Paulo Wanchope, 37
