= Rory Delap =

Irish professional footballer (born 1976)

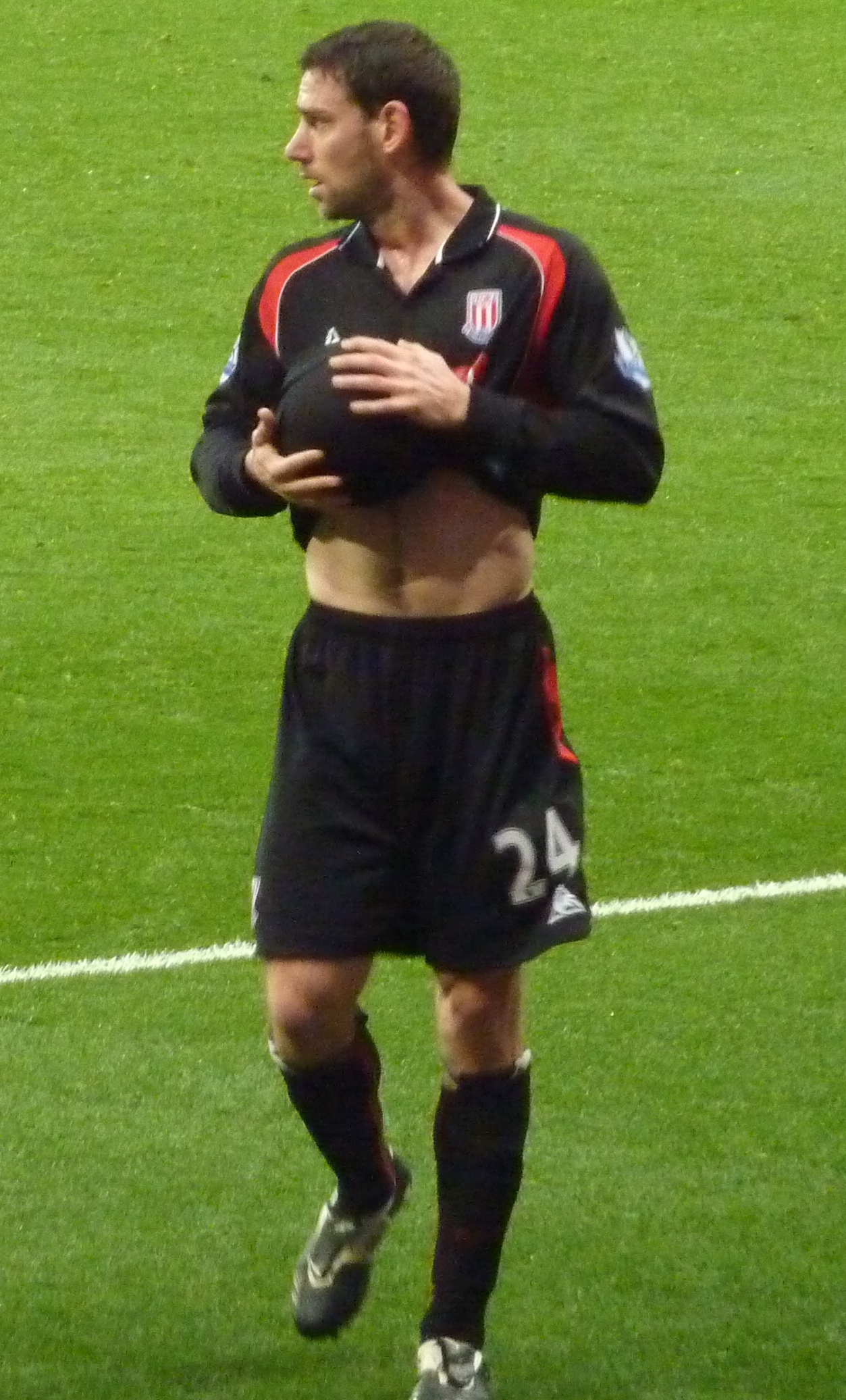
- Delap playing for Stoke City in 2010

Personal information
- Full name: Rory John Delap
- Date of birth: 6 July 1976 (age 50)
- Place of birth: Sutton Coldfield, England
- Height: 6 ft 0 in (1.83 m)
- Position: Midfielder

Youth career
- 1992–1994: Carlisle United

Senior career*
Years	Team	Apps	(Gls)
1994–1998	Carlisle United	65	(7)
1998–2001	Derby County	103	(11)
2001–2006	Southampton	132	(5)
2006–2007	Sunderland	12	(1)
2006	→ Stoke City (loan)	2	(0)
2007–2013	Stoke City	178	(8)
2013	→ Barnsley (loan)	6	(0)
2013	Burton Albion	6	(1)
Total		504	(33)

International career
1996–1998	Republic of Ireland U21	6	(1)
1998–2004	Republic of Ireland	11	(0)

Managerial career
- 2019: Stoke City (caretaker)
- * Club domestic league appearances and goals

Rory John Delap (born 6 July 1976) is a former professional footballer who played as a midfielder. Born in England, he made 11 appearances for the Republic of Ireland national team.

Delap started his career at Carlisle United and impressed enough to earn a move to Premier League side Derby County in 1998. In 2001, Delap joined Southampton for a club record of £4 million. After spending five years on the south coast, he moved to Sunderland. Following a brief spell on Wearside, Delap was loaned to Stoke City in October 2006. In just his second match for Stoke, against his parent club Sunderland, Delap suffered a broken leg. Despite this, Delap signed a permanent contract for Stoke in January 2007. He went on to become a vital member of the squad and his long throw-ins helped Stoke gain promotion to the Premier League and consolidate their position in the league. After spending six seasons at Stoke, Delap had short spells with Barnsley and Burton Albion before retiring in December 2013.

A midfielder by trade, he was renowned for his long throw-in ability. Between the touchlines, he was famed for his fitness and work rate, which gave him a valuable role in breaking up opposition play. Delap was a talented javelin thrower in his youth, and was touted to represent Ireland in the Olympics after his throw-ins shot to prominence following Stoke's promotion to the Premier League.

After finishing his playing career, Delap returned to his former club Derby County where he began his coaching career. After coaching the club's under-18 team, he replaced Darren Wassall as the under-21 head coach in February 2016, winning the U21 Premier League 1 Division 2 title in his first season in charge.

== Club career ==
=== Carlisle United ===
He was one of several promising players who came through the ranks at Brunton Park during the mid-1990s, alongside Matt Jansen, Scott Dobie and Lee Peacock. In 1997, he was part of the side which gained promotion to Division Two and defeated Colchester United on penalties to win the Football League Trophy at Wembley Stadium.

=== Derby County ===
Delap was signed by Derby County manager Jim Smith for £200,000 in February 1998, and went on to make 13 appearances during the remainder of the 1997–98 season. Despite failing to score a league goal during the 1998–99 season, he did manage to find the net in a second round League Cup tie with Manchester City. During the 1999–00 season he was Derby's top scorer with eight goals. His first goal of the campaign came during a 2–1 defeat to Arsenal. After scoring his second goal of the season in a 2–0 victory over Sheffield Wednesday, his third came during a 3–3 stalemate with his future club Southampton. A 3–1 home victory over Chelsea saw Delap score two goals and increase his tally to five, while it was just two games later when he scored against eventual champions Manchester United in a 2–1 loss at Pride Park. Later that season, Delap scored and assisted a goal in a 3–0 win over Leicester City – a game in which Stan Collymore broke his leg. His eighth and final goal of the campaign came after just 22 seconds of a 4–4 draw with Bradford City, although he was later sent off for conceding one of four penalties. During the 2000–01 season, Delap once again scored against both Leicester and Bradford. He scored his final goal for Derby in a 1–0 victory over Ipswich Town on 2 December 2000, which brought his total league tally to 11.

=== Southampton ===
On 10 July 2001, Southampton signed Delap for a fee of £4 million. In the process he not only became Stuart Gray's first signing since replacing Glenn Hoddle as manager, but also Southampton's record transfer – a tag he held onto for almost 11 years, before they signed Jay Rodriguez from Burnley for £7 million on 10 June 2012. Prior to Delap's arrival, his former club Carlisle received £700,000 from the deal. Delap's first goal for Southampton came during a 3–1 victory over Ipswich Town at Portman Road on 2 March 2002. It was later that month when he scored his first goal at St Mary's in a 1–1 draw with Fulham.

Although Delap failed to score during the 2002–03 campaign, he made a total of 30 appearances in all competitions and helped Southampton reach the 2003 FA Cup Final, despite missing the game due to an ankle injury. Although they narrowly lost to Arsenal after Robert Pires scored the only goal of the game, the Gunners had already qualified for the Champions League after finishing second in the Premier League, therefore Southampton qualified for the UEFA Cup. Their UEFA Cup campaign was short-lived, after a 1–1 draw with Steaua București at St. Mary's was followed by a 1–0 away defeat on 15 October 2003. Delap played in both legs.

Delap's third goal for Southampton and arguably the best of his career, was a spectacular bicycle kick in a 1–0 victory over Tottenham Hotspur on 27 March 2004. The 64th-minute strike ended a near two-year goal drought. Seven months later he scored two headers in a 2–2 draw with Arsenal at Highbury. Both goals came in the last ten minutes of the game, and would have secured three points for Southampton had it not been for Robin van Persie's last-minute equaliser, which maintained Arsenal's position at the top of the Premier League.

=== Sunderland ===
From Southampton, Delap was signed by Mick McCarthy for Sunderland in the 2005–06 season. He made six appearances for the club that season before injury struck. On 8 April 2006, under caretaker manager Kevin Ball, he clashed heads with teammate George McCartney during his side's league game with Fulham, a game that was subsequently abandoned. In doing so, he broke his nose and underwent an operation to adjust it correctly after being selected to play at Manchester United only to withdraw after suffering a nose bleed during the warm-up. Thus he was ruled out for the remainder of the season and Manchester United relegated Sunderland, and ended their own title hopes, with a 0–0 draw. He scored once in the league during his spell at Sunderland, a crucial equaliser in a 2–2 draw with Everton on 1 April 2006.

=== Stoke City ===
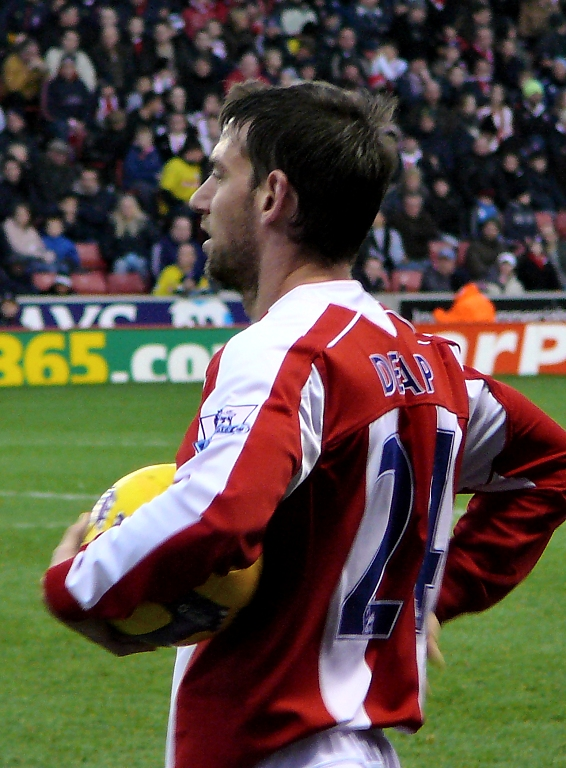
Rory Delap in 2008

Having become a marginal figure when Roy Keane took over as manager of Sunderland, Delap was loaned to Stoke City in October 2006. He made his debut in the 4–0 thumping of Leeds United at Elland Road. A week after signing on loan, Delap made his home debut for Stoke against his parent club Sunderland on 17 October 2006. However, after a challenge from Robbie Elliott, he sustained fractures to his tibia and fibula early in the game, resulting in a broken leg. Although the injury sidelined him for the remainder of the 2006–07 season, Stoke manager Tony Pulis signed Delap on a permanent basis on 9 January 2007.

==== 2007–08 ====
On 15 July 2007, Delap made his comeback in a pre-season friendly with Newcastle Town. On 15 September 2007, Delap scored his first goal for Stoke in a 1–1 draw with Hull. On 22 September 2007, Richard Cresswell scored from Delap's throw in a 3–1 win over Queens Park Rangers. On 1 January 2008, in a second 1–1 draw with Hull, Delap assisted Leon Cort with another long throw. On 9 February 2008, Delap scored his second goal of the season in a 4–2 victory over Wolverhampton Wanderers. Delap made a total of 46 appearances in the league, as Stoke finished 2nd and were promoted to the Premier League on the final day of the season. They had been away from the top-flight for 23 years.

==== 2008–09 ====
The potency of the "Delap Special" reached new heights as Stoke City began their debut Premier League season. Of their first 13 goals, seven were credited as Delap assists. Stoke's first Premiership goal from a Delap throw was Mamady Sidibe's injury-time winner against Aston Villa on 23 August 2008. His throws continued to cause further problems for Stoke's opposition throughout the season, and would have earned the Potters a point against Everton on 14 September, had it not been for Tim Cahill's 77th-minute header. The game finished 2–3, with both Stoke goals coming from Delap throws. Tony Pulis suggested his absence was a crucial factor in Stoke's 2–0 defeat to Chelsea on 27 September. He returned the following week to face Portsmouth, and despite helping to create Ricardo Fuller's goal from a throw-in, Stoke lost the game 2–1. It was just one game later when Delap scored his first goal of the season and only his third in a Stoke shirt. He met Sidibe's cross at the far post to give his side an important 2–1 victory over Tottenham Hotspur. Delap was sent off in Stoke's 1–0 win over Manchester City for fouling and kicking out at Shaun Wright-Phillips.

==== 2009–10 ====
Delap's throw-ins quickly caused problems at the beginning of the 2009–10 season. In Stoke's opening game against newly promoted Burnley, Delap's throw-in forced an own goal from Stephen Jordan in a 2–0 win. On 31 October 2009, Delap's throw-in created another goal for Stoke. Although Christophe Berra of Wolverhampton Wanderers attempted to clear the ball, it fell to Matthew Etherington, who volleyed it into the top corner. Delap then gave away two penalties within three games, against both Portsmouth and Arsenal. Portsmouth's Aruna Dindane was struck in the head by Delap's boot, while Andrei Arshavin was tripped up by Delap's leg. Both penalties were saved by Thomas Sørensen.

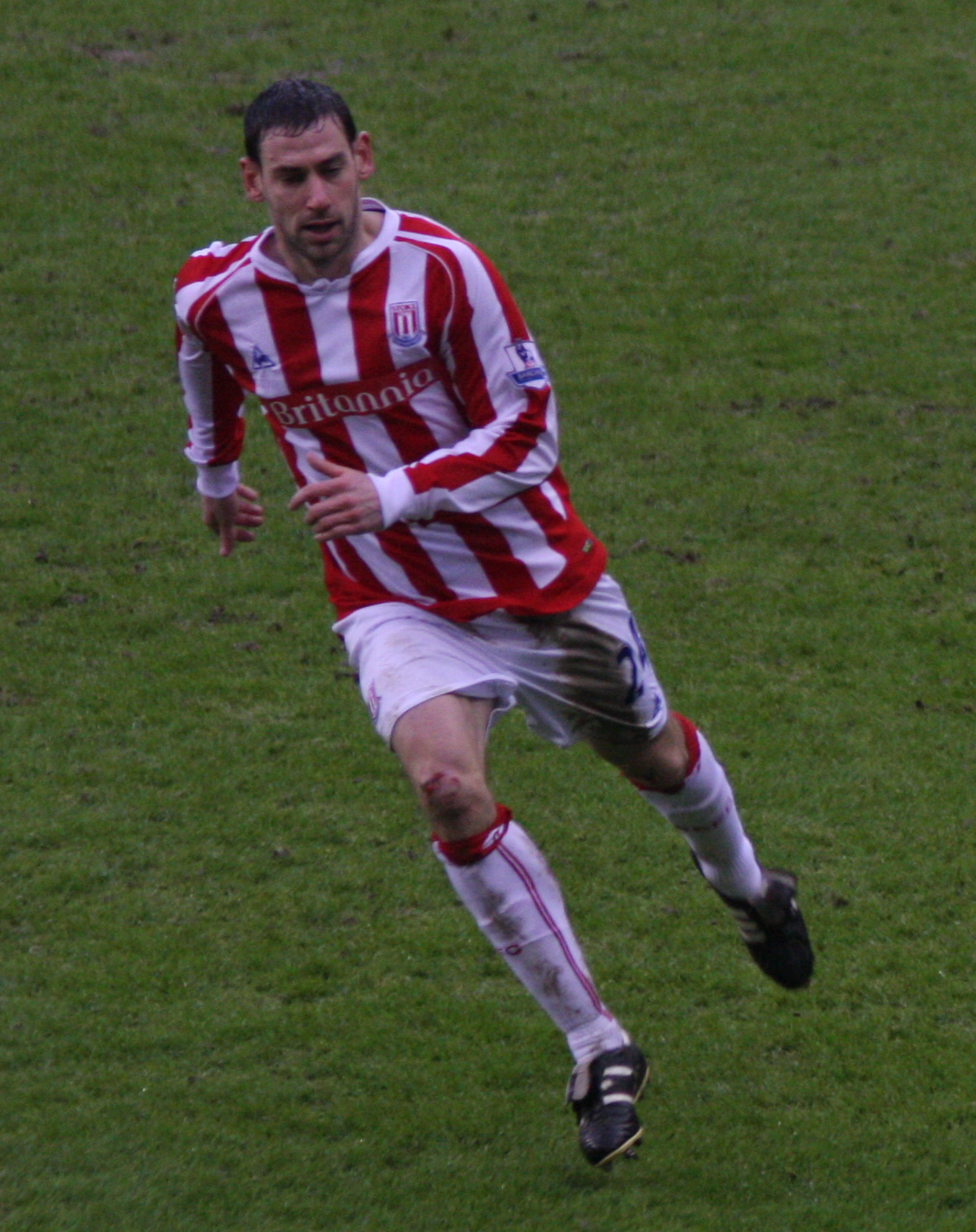
Rory Delap in 2010

Delap proved crucial in Stoke's 2009–10 FA Cup campaign. His throw-ins created two goals in a third-round win over York City, helping Stoke come from behind within just two minutes. Daniel Parslow headed the first into his own net, before Ricardo Fuller put Stoke ahead after York failed to clear the second. Just 70 seconds into their fourth-round tie with Arsenal, Fuller gave Stoke the lead from Delap's swirling throw-in. Stoke won the game 3–1. In their fifth-round tie against Manchester City, Fuller converted yet another Delap throw-in to cancel out an early goal from Shaun Wright-Phillips. Several pundits drew comparisons to Fuller's goal against Arsenal in the previous round. A replay was required after the game finished 1–1. The replay finished 1–1 over 90 minutes, meaning extra-time was required. Just five minutes into extra-time, Ryan Shawcross beat Shay Given to the ball and headed in from Delap's throw-in. Tuncay later added to the scoring, ensuring Stoke made it to the quarter-finals. Stoke were defeated 2–0 by holders Chelsea in the quarter-finals.

Delap in-directly assisted two more goals from throw-ins during the remainder of Stoke's league campaign. Danny Pugh scored in a 3–1 defeat to Arsenal on 27 February 2010, while Tuncay scored a header in a 1–1 draw with Burnley on 10 March 2010. Stoke finished the season in 11th place with 47 points, one place and two points higher than the previous season.

==== 2010–11 ====
On 13 September 2010, Delap made his 300th Premier League appearance against Aston Villa, becoming the 82nd player to reach the landmark. On 16 October 2010, Delap ended a 21-month goal drought against Bolton Wanderers. Although his goal was the equaliser, Stoke lost 2–1 during injury-time, with Ivan Klasnić's winner ironically occurring from a long throw-in. Just a few minutes after Klasnić's goal, he received two yellow cards in quick succession, with the second coming after catching Delap in the face while challenging for a header. He scored another rare goal against West Bromwich Albion in February 2011.

While Delap's throw-ins were becoming much less effective in the Premier League, they were decisive throughout Stoke's 2010–11 FA Cup campaign. They created goals against Brighton & Hove Albion, West Ham and Bolton Wanderers, helping Stoke reach their first ever FA Cup Final. Stoke lost 1–0 to Manchester City in the final, but as City had already qualified for the Champions League through the league, Stoke qualified for the Europa League.

In April 2011, Delap signed a one-year extension to his contract. After turning 35, Delap stated that he had no plans for retirement.

==== 2011–12 ====
Delap's throw-ins only created one goal during the 2011–12 season, but he did manage to find the back of the net on two occasions. Both goals were headers and came in home wins over Fulham and Blackburn. On 19 February 2012, in the fifth round of the FA Cup against Crawley Town, Delap received a straight red card for a sliding tackle on David Hunt. Despite the sending off, Stoke went on to win the game 2–0. Stoke later appealed against the decision and Delap's three-match ban was overturned. Delap made a total of 36 appearances in all competitions, six of which came in Stoke's historic Europa League campaign, which saw them reach the round of 32 before being knocked out by Spanish side Valencia. On 1 May 2012, Delap was rewarded with another one-year extension to his contract, which would see him extend his stay at Stoke until the end of the 2012–13 season.

==== 2012–13 ====
Delap found himself out of favour during the 2012–13 season, making just one appearance away at Reading on the opening day of the season.

On 31 January 2013, Delap joined Barnsley on loan until the end of the season. Soon after his move to Oakwell, he expressed his desire to make the move permanent in order to continue his playing career. Following his debut in a 2–1 win over Blackpool, his throw-in quickly caused problems as it created Scott Golbourne's equaliser in a 3–2 victory over Middlesbrough. He then assisted Chris Dagnall's header in his third league appearance against Wolves, before his throw created Tomasz Cywka's goal in a 5–3 defeat to Bristol City.

He left Stoke at the end of the season, bringing to an end a seven-year spell at the club.

=== Burton Albion ===
After leaving Stoke, Delap spent time on trial with League Two side Burton Albion in an attempt to earn a contract. He signed a one-year contract with the Brewers on 18 July 2013. His third appearance and first as a contracted Burton player was a friendly against Stoke. Burton lost the game 2–0, as Delap played 55 minutes at right-back. He played seven matches for Burton scoring once in a 2–2 draw against Cheltenham Town on 3 August 2013. On 16 December 2013, Delap announced his retirement from football.

== International career ==
A former Republic of Ireland under-21 international, Delap won 11 caps for the national team between 1998 and 2004. He was not included in the Irish squad for the 2002 FIFA World Cup, where the nation reached the final sixteen of the tournament. His international career was marked by a number of withdrawals, the last of which was with a twisted knee on 25 April 2004 before a midweek friendly with Poland.

== Coaching career ==
After retiring from playing he began working as a coach at Derby County's academy. In June 2015 he was appointed coach of Derby's under-18 side. On 10 February 2016, he was promoted to coach of the under-21 team.

Delap returned to Stoke in June 2018 as first-team coach to Gary Rowett. Delap took caretaker charge of Stoke on 1 November 2019 following the sacking of Nathan Jones. His one game in charge was a 2–0 home loss to West Bromwich Albion four days later, and Michael O'Neill was appointed on 9 November. Delap left his role at Stoke in January 2023.

In June 2023, Delap was appointed assistant under head coach Robbie Keane at Israeli club Maccabi Tel Aviv F.C. Delap and his former international teammate Keane were evacuated to Greece during the Gaza war, while their team led the table with four wins and a draw. After helping the club to win the league and Toto Cup, Delap along with Keane departed the club.

== Throw-ins ==
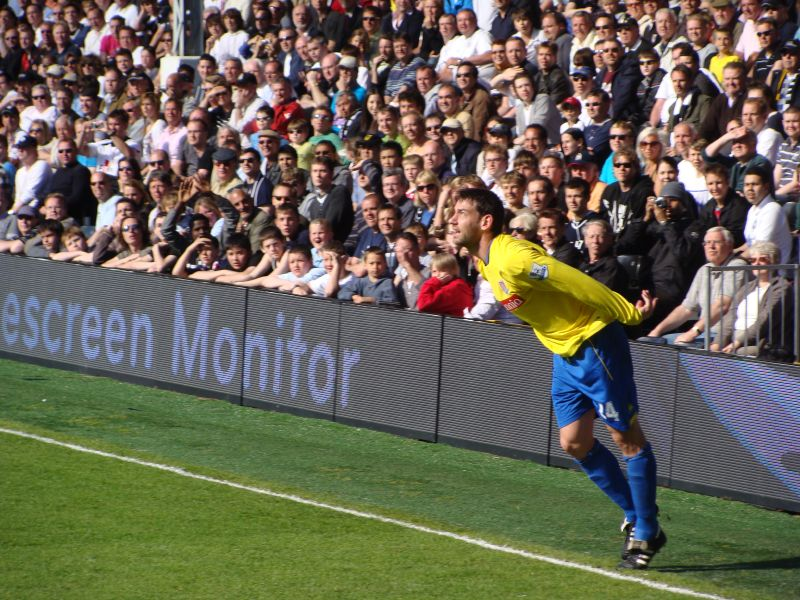
Delap after a throw in 2009

Delap, a former schoolboy javelin champion, is renowned for having had one of the longest and most feared throw-ins in football; his throws, noted by Martin O'Neill as equivalent to "a corner or a free kick", often ranged 30–40 metres (98–131 ft) (averaging 38 m (125 ft)), and could reach the speed of 60 km/h (37 mph). They served as an assist in more than one case before 2008. Numerous experts, including his former manager Tony Pulis, commented on the technique Delap employed, the length and flatness undoing many a defence. "It causes so many problems (amongst the opposition defence). I think it's because they're so flat. They're not lofted into the air, he throws it pretty flat and it's very difficult for defenders to pick up the flight."

Fellow professionals similarly renowned for long throw-ins, such as Mario Melchiot, formerly of Wigan Athletic, and Lee Dixon, formerly of Arsenal, also spoke of their admiration for Delap. Melchiot described Delap's ability as "one hell of a throw-in" and a "great weapon", having already set Delap out for unique praise in stating that he did not think there was "anyone in the league that can throw like him".

To increase the momentum of the throw, Delap took four steps from the advertising boards around the pitch, followed by one long stride. In doing this he planted his front foot solidly on the ground propelling all momentum forward, thus increasing the speed with which the ball was released. Delap said he did not work on building his upper body strength and physique, although he used his shoulders and lower back muscles to give power to his throw. For the ball to reach his target faster, Delap threw it on a flat trajectory releasing in such a way as to cause large amounts of backspin. This helped to counter gravity so the ball travelled on a more level elevation even though it was released at such a low angle. He tended to target two players within 6ft of each other. His throw-ins are reputed as more accurate than most corners being that more muscles are used to control the direction in which the ball travels.

I have never seen anyone with a throw-in like Delap's and I believe his missiles have created seven out of Stoke's 13 league goals this season. I had a long throw and used to practice them, but I could only just about get it in the box. My team-mate Perry Groves could throw it a long way and we have seen the likes of Dave Challinor and Andy Legg do it – but nothing like Delap. Most long throws tend to be a bit loopy, whereas Delap's are fired in like a free-kick – but even more dangerous.

— Former England, Stoke City and Arsenal defender Lee Dixon, speaking in 2008.

Factors, according to Dixon's analysis, which further enhanced the dangerous nature of Delap's throw-ins were the fact that "you cannot be offside from a throw-in, so the attackers can crowd the six-yard box" and "because a free-kick starts with the ball on the ground it means it has to have a natural arc in order to get up and over the first defender", whereas "from a throw-in the ball starts from six-feet and it is the angle and trajectory of Delap's darts that make them so potent".

In the 2008–09 Premier League season Delap's throw-ins led directly to both goals scored in at least two matches. Both Stoke goals in the 3–2 loss to Everton on 14 September 2008 came about as a result of Delap's throw. Afterwards Everton manager David Moyes referred to Delap as the "Human Sling". Later, Delap used his ability to help score Stoke's goals in the 2–1 victory over Arsenal at the Britannia Stadium on 1 November 2008. The first of these travelled 45 metres from the sideline into the penalty area.

The then Chelsea manager Luiz Felipe Scolari described the technique as "fantastic" and suggested the goalkeeper ought not to attempt claiming the ball in this situation. "I think he puts the ball better with his hands than his foot, it's fantastic. I have never seen anything like this in my life; 10 metres outside midfield, this boy puts the ball inside the area. Maybe it's not beautiful football but it's effective."

Some teams developed techniques to try and put Delap's long throws off. Notable examples include against Hull City on 29 November 2008, goalkeeper Boaz Myhill kicking the ball out beyond the byline for a corner kick instead of out into touch when under pressure; unused Hull substitute Dean Windass received a yellow card for unsporting behaviour after warming up too close to Delap when preparing to take a throw-in. On 27 March 2010, West Ham United erected an extra set of advertising boards considerably close to the touchline to hamper Delap's run-up, but he was still capable of reaching the penalty box in spite of the limited space. These boards backfired when West Ham lost possession from a Julien Faubert throw-in, which led to Ricardo Fuller scoring the only goal of the game in Stoke's favour. Burnley also tried a similar tactic; however, the match finished 1–1 with Stoke's goal coming from a Delap throw.

Delap served as the inspiration for Danny Brooks – a P.E. teacher from West Yorkshire who broke the world record for the longest football throw-in. He performed a flip throw to gain extra momentum and lifted the record to 49.78 m (163.3 ft). The record was once again broken on 18 June 2010 by Thomas Grønnemark of Denmark, who threw the ball 51.33 m (168.4 ft).

== Personal life ==
Delap was born in Sutton Coldfield to Irish parents. His family moved to Carlisle when he was just six months old. He subsequently supported Carlisle United and attended matches at Brunton Park with his father.

Rory's father is John Delap from Letterkenny and his mother Maura Delap from Kells. His uncle is Paddy Delap, a Letterkenny businessman, golfer, and athletics coach who runs Clarke's Newsagent's and organises an annual charity cycling event in aid of cancer noted for launching the career of former Cervélo TestTeam member Philip Deignan. Another uncle, Anthony, is an actor-playwright whose works have been performed at An Grianán Theatre in the town. Delap visits his family in Letterkenny at least once every year.

He married Helen Brentnall, in 2006. They met after he joined Derby County, where she was employed as a physiotherapist. Her mum was physiotherapist for the England cricket team. They were the first couple to marry at Shottle Hall in Derbyshire. Her father was reported as being a General Practitioner in the Derbyshire area.

Their sons, Liam and Finn are both professional footballers, playing for Nottingham Forest and Burton Albion respectively.

== Charity work ==
Footballers are always involved in charity work or more widely in community work. Stoke City Football Club have a partnership with the Donna Louise Trust and one Christmas I went with some of the other players and it was like being hit by a sledge hammer. The charity provides end of life care for children and I came out in tears. I have children myself and it just hit home what these children and their parents were facing. It's not just about having children yourself though – the players who didn't have kids were also deeply moved by it. So I've become a patron of the charity and got involved in fund-raising.

— Delap, speaking on his work with the Donna Louise Trust.

Delap has been acknowledged for his generosity towards the Donna Louise Children's Hospice in Trentham, Stoke-on-Trent. He completed a 202-mile bike ride from Newcastle upon Tyne to Edinburgh in June 2009, raising more than £7,000 for the charity. He then repeated the same route in June 2010, completing it in just two days.

Delap also took part in and won Marco Pierre White's Stoke Kitchen contest, with the proceeds benefiting Caudwell Children. The contest also featured a special appearance from Soccer AM's Tubes.

Due to the use of his shoulders and lower back muscles when throwing a football, Delap is an ambassador of Back in Play – a campaign to help raise awareness of Ankylosing spondylitis.

Delap appears on the cover of "...And She Laughed No More: Stoke City's First Premiership Adventure", a book written by Stoke supporter Stephen Foster.

== Career statistics ==
=== Club ===
Appearances and goals by club, season and competition
Club	Season	League			FA Cup		League Cup		Other		Total	
Club	Season	Division	Apps	Goals	Apps	Goals	Apps	Goals	Apps	Goals	Apps	Goals
Carlisle United	1992–93	Third Division	1	0	0	0	0	0	0	0	1	0
Carlisle United	1993–94	Third Division	1	0	0	0	0	0	1 (Note: Appearances in Football League Trophy)	0	2	0
Carlisle United	1994–95	Third Division	3	0	0	0	0	0	0	0	3	0
Carlisle United	1995–96	Second Division	19	3	0	0	1	0	4	0	24	3
Carlisle United	1996–97	Third Division	32	4	3	0	3	0	7 (Note: Five appearances in Football League Trophy and two in Third Division play-offs)	0	45	4
Carlisle United	1997–98	Second Division	9	0	0	0	1	0	2	0	12	0
Carlisle United	Total		65	7	3	0	5	0	14	0	87	7
Derby County	1997–98	Premier League	13	0	0	0	0	0	—		13	0
Derby County	1998–99	Premier League	23	0	1	0	3	1	—		27	1
Derby County	1999–2000	Premier League	34	8	1	0	2	0	—		37	8
Derby County	2000–01	Premier League	33	3	1	0	2	1	—		36	4
Derby County	Total		103	11	3	0	7	2	0	0	113	13
Southampton	2001–02	Premier League	28	2	0	0	1	0	—		29	2
Southampton	2002–03	Premier League	24	0	4	0	2	0	—		30	0
Southampton	2003–04	Premier League	27	1	0	0	3	0	2 (Note: Appearances in UEFA Cup)	0	32	1
Southampton	2004–05	Premier League	37	2	4	0	2	0	—		43	2
Southampton	2005–06	Championship	16	0	0	0	2	0	—		18	0
Southampton	Total		132	5	8	0	10	0	2	0	152	5
Sunderland	2005–06	Premier League	6	1	0	0	0	0	—		6	1
Sunderland	2006–07	Championship	6	0	0	0	1	0	—		7	0
Sunderland	Total		12	1	0	0	1	0	0	0	13	1
Stoke City	2006–07	Championship	2	0	0	0	0	0	—		2	0
Stoke City	2007–08	Championship	44	2	1	0	1	0	—		46	2
Stoke City	2008–09	Premier League	34	2	1	0	1	0	—		36	2
Stoke City	2009–10	Premier League	36	0	5	0	0	0	—		41	0
Stoke City	2010–11	Premier League	37	2	6	0	3	0	—		46	2
Stoke City	2011–12	Premier League	26	2	3	0	1	0	6 (Note: Appearances in UEFA Europa League)	0	36	2
Stoke City	2012–13	Premier League	1	0	0	0	0	0	—		1	0
Stoke City	Total		180	8	16	0	6	0	6	0	208	8
Barnsley (loan)	2012–13	Championship	6	0	1	0	0	0	—		7	0
Burton Albion	2013–14	League Two	6	1	0	0	1	0	—		7	1
Career total			504	33	31	0	29	2	22	0	587	35

=== International ===
Appearances and goals by national team and year
National team	Year	Apps	Goals
Republic of Ireland	1998	3	0
Republic of Ireland	1999	2	0
Republic of Ireland	2000	1	0
Republic of Ireland	2001	0	0
Republic of Ireland	2002	3	0
Republic of Ireland	2003	1	0
Republic of Ireland	2004	1	0
Total		11	0

=== As a manager ===
Managerial record by team and tenure
Team	From	To	Matches	Won	Drawn	Lost	Win%
Stoke City (caretaker)	1 November 2019	8 November 2019	1	0	0	1	0.00
Total			1	0	0	1	0.00

== Honours ==
=== Player ===
Carlisle United

- Football League Trophy: 1996–97

Stoke City

- Football League Championship runner-up: 2007–08
- FA Cup runner-up: 2010–11

Individual

- Stoke City Coaching Staff's Player of the Year: 2008–09
- Sir Stanley Matthews Potteries Footballer of the Year: 2008–09

=== Manager ===
Derby County

- U21 Premier League 1 Division 2: 2015–16

== See also ==
- List of Republic of Ireland international footballers born outside the Republic of Ireland
