= Daniel Collins =

Daniel, Danny, or Dan Collins may refer to:

== Daniel Collins ==
- Daniel Collins (canoeist) or Danny Collins (born 1970), Australian Olympic canoeist
- Daniel Collins (Dark Shadows), a character in Dark Shadows
- Daniel Collins, American actor in the film The Stoned Age
- Daniel Collins (priest) (died 1648), Canon of Windsor
- Daniel Collins (hurler) (born 1994), Irish hurler
- Daniel Collins (rower) (born 1985), Irish rower
- Daniel J. Collins (died 1926), New York assemblyman
- Daniel P. Collins (born 1963), American lawyer and federal judge

== Danny Collins ==
- Danny Collins (film), 2015 comedy-drama film
- Danny Collins (footballer) (born 1980), Welsh footballer
- Danny Collins (Canadian football) (born 1993), American player of Canadian football
- Danny Boy Collins (born 1967), English wrestler

== Dan Collins ==
- Dan Collins (American football) (born 1976), American football player
- Dan Collins (baseball) (1854–1883), baseball player
- Dan Collins (journalist) (1943–2024), senior producer for CBSNews.com
- Dan Collins (footballer) (1872–1925), played Australian football for St. Kilda in the VFL
