= Michel Ngonge =

Association football player

Personal information
- Full name: Félix-Michel Ngonge
- Date of birth: 17 August 1967 (age 59)
- Place of birth: Huy, Belgium
- Positions: Midfielder; striker

Senior career*
| Years | Team | Apps | (Gls) |
| 1986–1988 | Racing Jet Brussels | 12 | (1) |
| 1988–1989 | Racing Jet Wavre | 25 | (5) |
| 1989–1990 | Gent | 5 | (0) |
| 1990–1992 | Seraing | 18 | (7) |
| 1992–1995 | La Louvière | 23 | (10) |
| 1995–1996 | Harelbeke | 31 | (14) |
| 1996–1998 | Samsunspor | 52 | (1) |
| 1998–2000 | Watford | 56 | (11) |
| 2000 | → Huddersfield Town (loan) | 4 | (0) |
| 2000–2001 | Queens Park Rangers | 15 | (3) |
| 2001–2002 | Kilmarnock | 12 | (3) |
| Total | | 253 | (55) |

International career
| 1995–2001 | DR Congo | 2 | (0) |
- * Club domestic league appearances and goals

Félix-Michel Ngonge (born 17 August 1967) is a former professional footballer who played as a midfielder or striker.

Besides in Belgium, he has played in Turkey, England, and Scotland. Ngonge played international football for Zaire, and later the renamed Democratic Republic of Congo team.

== Club career ==
=== Early career ===
Ngonge started his footballing career in Belgium with Racing Jet de Bruxelles, Gent, RFC Seraing, La Louvière and Harelbeke, before moving to Turkish side Samsunspor, and then Watford in June 1998.

=== Watford ===
During his time at Watford he became an integral part of the team scoring 11 goals in 56 games. He also played an important role in the 1998–99 season in which Watford gained promotion to the Premier League for the first time, via the play-offs. Ngonge scored six goals in his first season at Watford, scoring the all-important goal in the first leg of the Division One play-off against Birmingham City.

==== Loan to Huddersfield Town ====
In the 1999–2000 season, despite starting the season well, scoring in the opening match of the season, Ngonge found himself out of favour at Vicarage Road and was loaned out to Huddersfield Town in March 2000.

=== Queens Park Rangers ===
Following the relegation of Watford back to Division 1, Ngonge failed to make much of an impression and was subsequently sold to Queens Park Rangers for £50,000, where he played 15 games and scored three goals.

=== Kilmarnock ===
Ngonge then finished his career at Scottish side Kilmarnock, where he scored three goals in his 12 games at the Rugby Park-based club.

== Personal life ==
His son, Cyril Ngonge, is also a professional footballer.

== Honours ==
Watford

- Football League First Division play-offs: 1999
