= Dan Collins (footballer) =

Australian rules footballer

Personal information
- Full name: Daniel Charles Collins
- Born: 22 August 1872; Penshurst, Victoria
- Died: 6 July 1925 (aged 52); Kensington, New South Wales
- Original team: Richmond (VFA)
- Height: 182 cm (6 ft 0 in)
- Weight: 90 kg (198 lb)

Playing career^{1}
| Years | Club | Games (Goals) |
| 1897–98 | St Kilda | 7 (0) |
- ^{1} Playing statistics correct to the end of 1898.

Daniel Charles Collins (22 August 1872 – 6 July 1925) was an Australian rules footballer who played with St Kilda in the Victorian Football League (VFL), and who served in South Africa during the Second Boer War.

== Football (pre-Boer War) ==
=== Victorian Artillery ===
Collins joined the Victorian Artillery stationed at Fort Queenscliff, Victoria, and was captain of their football team in 1891, and 1892.

=== Richmond (VFA) ===
He also played three matches for Richmond in the Victorian Football Association (VFA) in 1891

=== St Kilda (VFA & VFL) ===
He also played for St Kilda in the VFA from 1892 to 1896; and in the first two years of the Victorian Football League (VFL) competition (1897 and 1898).

== Police Force ==
Collins served in the Victorian police force; and, later, in the New South Wales police force.

== Military service ==
Collins served in South Africa with the First Battalion Australian Commonwealth Horse in the Second Boer War. A policeman, Collins, enlisted on 25 January 1902 as a trooper, and was promoted to Lance-Corporal on 8 July 1902.

Murray (1911, p. 166) notes that, "only single men were taken", and that "the men selected were required to be good shots and good horsemen; men of previous service having preference, if medically fit". The contingent left Sydney on 18 February 1902, on the troopship Custodian, disembarking at Durban on 19 March 1902, and returned to Australia on the controversially disease-ridden and seriously overcrowded troopship Drayton Grange, leaving Durban on 11 July 1902, and arriving at Sydney on 11 August 1902.

== Football (post-Boer War) ==
=== East Sydney (NSWAFA) ===
Following his military service in South Africa, he played with the East Sydney Australian Football Club in the New South Wales Australian Football Association (NSWAFA); and was its first captain in 1903.

In 1903 he played in a representative "Metropolitan" combined team, against a combined "Northern District League" team. He kicked two goals for the East Sydney team that defeated North Shore 6.8 (44) to 4.2. (26) to win the competition's inaugural premiership in 1903.

He continued to play for East Sydney until, at least, 1908.

== Pony Trainer ==
Having left the police force, and having spent eighteen months conducting the Temple Bar Hotel at 312 George Street, Sydney, he sold his interest in the hotel, and turned his attention to pony training, at which he was highly respected and, ultimately, very successful.

== Death ==
Having had an operation two years earlier that had required the amputation of his leg, he died at his residence, "Sellbrook" — at 221 Anzac Parade, named after his favourite horse, Sellbrook — in the Sydney suburb of Kensington on 6 July 1925.
