= Kevin Magee (footballer) =

Scottish Footballer

Personal information
- Date of birth: 10 April 1971 (age 55)
- Place of birth: Edinburgh, Scotland
- Position: Midfielder

Senior career*
Years	Team	Apps	(Gls)
1990–1991	Armadale Thistle		
1991–1993	Partick Thistle	11	(0)
1993–1995	Preston North End	26	(1)
1995	Plymouth	4	(0)
1995–1996	Scarborough	28	(1)
1996–1997	Dundee	25	(0)
1997–1999	Livingston	34	(2)
1999	→ Montrose (loan)	14	(5)
1999–2001	Berwick Rangers	38	(0)
2001–2002	Montrose	9	(1)
- Bathgate Thistle
- * Club domestic league appearances and goals

Kevin Magee (born 10 April 1971) is a Scottish former professional footballer, active mainly in the 1990s, who played as a midfielder for Livingston, Montrose, Berwick Rangers, Dundee and Preston North End.

== Club career ==
=== Early playing career ===
Magee began his career with Armadale before joining Partick Thistle in 1991.

=== Partick Thistle ===
Aged 20, he made his debut appearance on Monday, 12 August 1991, in a 1–0 win away to Meadowbank Thistle in the SFL First Division. Despite making only one start for the first team over the following two years, he was signed by Preston North End.

=== Preston North End ===
A series of injuries, including three broken legs, limited his chances at Preston. He played 29 games, scoring once, and he was released at the end of his contract. During his time at Preston, he played in the same team as David Beckham who was on loan from Manchester United at the time.

=== Plymouth Argyle ===
Neil Warnock signed Magee for Plymouth in September 1995 but allowed him to leave on a free transfer less than three months later, citing a lack of versatility as a factor, there being no vacancy in the Argyle side for his preferred left-wing position.

=== Scarborough and return to Scotland ===
After spending the remainder of the season with Scarborough, he returned to Scotland with Dundee.

He went on to play for Livingston, and had a brief loan spell with Montrose. Magee was sacked by Livi after being blamed for a prank on then manager Ray Stewart.

Following his departure from Livi, he signed for Berwick Rangers before returning to Montrose again. He ended his career in his hometown with Bathgate Thistle.

== Personal life ==
In June 2000, Magee was caught attempting to smuggle almost 30,000 cigarettes into Scotland from Turkey. He was ordered to carry out 240 hours of community service.

Magee was jailed in 2017 for shoplifting thousands of pounds worth of whisky from shops in St Andrews and Dalwhinnie.
