= Neil Trebble =

English footballer

Personal information
- Full name: David Neil Whalley
- Date of birth: 16 February 1969 (age 57)
- Place of birth: Hitchin, England
- Position: Forward

Senior career*
Years	Team	Apps	(Gls)
- Stevenage Borough
1993–1994	Scunthorpe United	14	(2)
1994-1995	Preston North End	8 (11)	(4)
1995-1996	Scarborough	47	(8)
1996-1998	Stevenage Borough	62	(13)
1998-1999	St Albans City		
1998-1999	Welling United	16	(3)
1998-1999	Shelbourne	4	(1)
1999-2000	Hayes	33	(1)
2000-2001	Molesey		
2001-2003	Arlesey Town		
2005-2006	Aylesbury United	3	(0)
- * Club domestic league appearances and goals

David Neil Trebble (born 16 February 1969) is a former English professional footballer who played as a Forward. Although most of his career was played in non-league football, he played 19 matches in the Football League for Preston North End.

He was regarded as a physical player with good heading ability. Trebble started adult life in the army, having six years in the Grenadier Guards. He was discovered by Scunthorpe United playing for Stevenage Borough. After one season at Glanford Park, Trebble moved to Preston North End on a free transfer. He made his debut in a goalless draw at Darlington.

In his one season at Preston, he scored four goals in 19 league appearances. 11 of his league appearances and 3 of his 4 goals came from the bench. With a couple of months left in the 1994-1995 season, Trebble left Preston and joined Scarborough.

He later became a manager Aylesbury United, following the departure of Danny Nicholls in December 2005. With Aylesbury facing a relegation battle, however Trebble was unsuccessful in keeping the side in the league. He was later appointed manager of United Counties League side AFC Kempston Rovers in June 2007.
