= Allan Smart =

Scottish footballer and manager

Personal information
- Full name: Allan Andrew Colin Smart
- Date of birth: 8 July 1974 (age 52)
- Place of birth: Perth, Scotland
- Height: 6 ft 2 in (1.88 m)
- Position: Striker

Senior career*
Years	Team	Apps	(Gls)
1993–1994	Caledonian		
1994	Caledonian Thistle	4	(0)
1994–1996	Preston North End	21	(6)
1995	→ Carlisle United (loan)	4	(0)
1996	→ Northampton Town (loan)	1	(0)
1996–1998	Carlisle United	45	(16)
1998–2001	Watford	56	(12)
2001	→ Hibernian (loan)	5	(1)
2001	→ Stoke City (loan)	2	(0)
2001–2002	Oldham Athletic	21	(6)
2002–2003	Dundee United	17	(0)
2003–2004	Crewe Alexandra	6	(0)
2004–2005	Milton Keynes Dons	18	(4)
2005–2006	Bury	13	(1)
2006–2007	Portadown	20	(5)
2007–2008	Burscough		
2009	Southport		
Total		229	(51)

Managerial career
- 2014–2015: Daventry Town
- * Club domestic league appearances and goals

Allan Andrew Colin Smart (born 8 July 1974) is a Scottish football manager and former player who most recently managed Southern Football League club Daventry Town, where he also briefly served as club chairman.

In a 16-year playing career, Smart appeared as a striker for Caledonian, Caledonian Thistle, Preston North End, Carlisle United, Northampton Town, Watford, Hibernian, Stoke City, Oldham Athletic, Dundee United, Crewe Alexandra, Milton Keynes Dons, Bury, Portadown, Burscough and Southport.

== Career ==
Smart began his career with junior club Balbeggie and had spells with St Johnstone and Brechin City, but without appearing for either's first team. In 1993, he joined Highland League club Inverness Caledonian; the following year Smart made his Scottish League debut following the merger which created Inverness Caledonian Thistle with entry into the Scottish League Third Division, but was soon sold to Preston North End for a fee of £15000. Here he was sent out on loan to a number of clubs to gain experience and match practice. These clubs included Carlisle United and Northampton Town. In between these loan deals he also managed to make first team appearances for Preston. However, after just thirty-one appearances for the club he was signed permanently by Carlisle in 1996.

During his time at Carlisle he helped them to promotion to the English Second Division including key goals against Lincoln City in a 1–0 victory and in a 5–1 victory over Torquay United. In the following season he did enough to impress over two league fixtures against Watford that Hornets manager, Graham Taylor, would pay £100,000 for his signature in 1998.

When at Watford he helped them get promoted to the Premier League for the 1999–2000 season. He scored the second goal after coming on as a substitute in Watford's 2–0 victory against Bolton in the 1999 Football League First Division play-off final. Watford struggled to get a foot hold in the division as they finished 20th with just 24 points. However Smart still managed to score goals, including the winner against Chelsea and the equaliser against Tottenham Hotspur. He stayed with the club until November 2001, after two loan moves to Hibernian (where he scored once against St Johnstone) and Stoke City respectively. In his second and final appearance for Stoke he was sent off after a clash with Oldham's Darren Sheridan on 21 November 2001. He then signed for Oldham Athletic for a fee of £225,000 on 30 November 2001 and would ironically line up alongside Sheridan for his Oldham debut against Cardiff on 1 December 2001, a matter of days after their initial altercation.

His time at Oldham was both frustrating and disappointing for Smart, as he managed just twenty-one appearances during his season-long stay at the club, before being released at the end of the season. Since leaving Oldham in 2002, he had spells at Dundee United, Crewe Alexandra, MK Dons and Bury (where he scored once against Leyton Orient) before signing for Portadown in the close season of 2006. He scored nine goals over the course of the 2006–07 season.

In July 2007, Smart joined Conference North side Burscough on a season-long loan. When the loan deal expired, Smart made the move permanent as his Portadown contract had also expired. After the departure of manager Liam Watson from Burscough, Smart became the assistant manager at the club, whilst also remaining on the playing staff. In September 2009, he took up a full-time job, as Head of Youth Development at Southport, while temporarily remaining as player and assistant manager part-time at Burscough.

In November 2014, Smart took on his first position as a manager after replacing Darran Foster at Southern League Division One Central side Daventry Town.

After the shock departure of chairman Iain Humphrey in June 2015, Smart relinquished his role as manager to become Daventry Town's new chairman.

== Personal life ==
Smart is divorced with four children. He is the son of a retired policeman.

In December 2001, Smart was involved in an incident after Oldham Athletic's Christmas party which saw him grab the throat of a barman, headbutt a fan of the club and cause £3,049 of damage to some hotel doors. In March 2002 he was arrested for assaulting a police officer in a brawl outside a police station. He subsequently pled guilty to affray, damaging property and assault with intent to resist arrest and was ordered to pay a £2,350 in compensation and costs.

In March 2017, Smart pled guilty to a charge of wounding with intent to cause grievous bodily harm at Swindon Crown Court after he bit off the earlobe of a friend in April 2016. He was ordered to pay a fine of £1,500 and do 300 hours of community work.

In March 2025, Smart was ordered to pay compensation to police he fought in a drunken rammy Smart was charged with assaulting his wife and another couple during June 2024.

== Career statistics ==
Appearances and goals by club, season and competition
Club	Season	League			FA Cup		League Cup		Other^{[A]}		Total	
Club	Season	Division	Apps	Goals	Apps	Goals	Apps	Goals	Apps	Goals	Apps	Goals
Preston North End	1994–95	Third Division	19	6	2	1	0	0	1	0	22	7
Preston North End	1995–96	Third Division	2	0	0	0	0	0	1	0	3	0
Preston North End	Total		21	6	2	1	0	0	2	0	25	7
Carlisle United (loan)	1995–96	Second Division	4	0	0	0	0	0	0	0	4	0
Northampton Town (loan)	1996–97	Third Division	1	0	0	0	0	0	0	0	1	0
Carlisle United	1996–97	Third Division	28	10	4	0	0	0	5	0	37	10
Carlisle United	1997–98	Second Division	16	6	0	0	1	1	0	0	17	7
Carlisle United	Total		44	16	4	0	1	1	5	0	54	17
Watford	1998–99	First Division	35	7	1	0	1	0	3	1	40	8
Watford	1999–2000	Premier League	14	5	0	0	2	0	0	0	16	5
Watford	2000–01	First Division	8	0	0	0	0	0	0	0	8	0
Watford	2001–02	First Division	0	0	0	0	0	0	0	0	0	0
Watford	Total		57	12	1	0	3	0	3	1	64	13
Hibernian (loan)	2001–02	Scottish Premier League	5	1	0	0	0	0	0	0	5	1
Stoke City (loan)	2001–02	Second Division	2	0	0	0	0	0	0	0	2	0
Oldham Athletic	2001–02	Second Division	21	6	1	0	0	0	2	1	24	7
Dundee United	2002–03	Scottish Premier League	17	0	0	0	1	0	0	0	18	0
Crewe Alexandra	2003–04	First Division	6	0	0	0	0	0	0	0	6	0
Milton Keynes Dons	2004–05	League One	18	4	2	1	2	1	0	0	22	6
Bury	2005–06	League Two	13	1	0	0	1	0	0	0	14	1
Career total			209	46	10	2	8	2	12	2	239	52

A. The "Other" column constitutes appearances and goals in the Football League Trophy and Football League play-offs.

== Honours ==
Carlisle United

- Football League Trophy: 1996–97

Watford

- Football League First Division play-offs: 1999
