= Scotland national football team results (1980–1999) =

Scotland national football team results
- 1872–1914 (matches 1–113)
- 1920–39 (matches 114–188)
- 1940–59 (matches 189–274)
- 1960–79 (matches 275–432)
- 1980–99 (matches 433–611)
- 2000–19 (matches 612–783)
- 2020–present (matches 784–849)

- Unofficial matches

This article lists the results for the Scotland national football team between 1980 and 1999.

== Key ==
Key to matches

- Att. = Match attendance
- (H) = Home ground
- (A) = Away ground
- (N) = Neutral ground

Key to record by opponent

- Pld = Games played
- W = Games won
- D = Games drawn
- L = Games lost
- GF = Goals for
- GA = Goals against

== Results ==
Scotland's score is shown first in each case.

Match number	Date	Venue	Opponents	Score	Competition	Scotland scorers	Att.	Ref.
433	26 March 1980	Hampden Park, Glasgow (H)	Portugal	4–1	Euro 1980 qualifying	Kenny Dalglish, Andy Gray, Steve Archibald, Archie Gemmill	35,000	
434	16 May 1980	Windsor Park, Belfast (A)	Northern Ireland	0–1	British Home Championship		18,000	
435	21 May 1980	Hampden Park, Glasgow (H)	Wales	1–0	British Home Championship	Willie Miller	31,359	
436	24 May 1980	Hampden Park, Glasgow (H)	England	0–2	British Home Championship		85,500	
437	28 May 1980	Warta Stadion, Poznań (A)	Poland	0–1	Friendly		25,000	
438	31 May 1980	Nepstadion, Budapest (A)	Hungary	1–3	Friendly	Steve Archibald	6,600	
439	10 September 1980	Rasunda Stadion, Solna (A)	Sweden	1–0	World Cup qualification	Gordon Strachan	39,831	
440	15 October 1980	Hampden Park, Glasgow (H)	Portugal	0–0	World Cup qualification		60,765	
441	25 February 1981	National Stadium, Ramat Gan (A)	Israel	1–0	World Cup qualification	Kenny Dalglish	35,000	
442	25 March 1981	Hampden Park, Glasgow (H)	Northern Ireland	1–1	World Cup qualification	John Wark	78,444	
443	28 April 1981	Hampden Park, Glasgow (H)	Israel	3–1	World Cup qualification	John Robertson (2), David Provan	61,489	
444	16 May 1981	Vetch Field, Swansea (A)	Wales	0–2	British Home Championship		18,935	
445	19 May 1981	Hampden Park, Glasgow (H)	Northern Ireland	2–0	British Home Championship	Ray Stewart, Steve Archibald	25,448	
446	23 May 1981	Wembley Stadium, London (A)	England	1–0	British Home Championship	John Robertson	90,000	
447	9 September 1981	Hampden Park, Glasgow (H)	Sweden	2–0	World Cup qualification	Joe Jordan, John Robertson	81,511	
448	14 October 1981	Windsor Park, Belfast (A)	Northern Ireland	0–0	World Cup qualification		35,000	
449	18 November 1981	Estádio da Luz, Lisbon (A)	Portugal	1–2	World Cup qualification	Paul Sturrock	25,000	
450	24 February 1982	Estadio Luis Casanova, Valencia (A)	Spain	0–3	Friendly		30,000	
451	23 March 1982	Hampden Park, Glasgow (H)	Netherlands	2–1	Friendly	Frank Gray, Kenny Dalglish	71,848	
452	28 April 1982	Windsor Park, Belfast (A)	Northern Ireland	1–1	British Home Championship	John Wark	20,000	
453	24 May 1982	Hampden Park, Glasgow (H)	Wales	1–0	British Home Championship	Asa Hartford	25,284	
454	29 May 1982	Hampden Park, Glasgow (H)	England	0–1	British Home Championship		80,529	
455	15 June 1982	Estadio La Rosaleda, Málaga (N)	New Zealand	5–2	World Cup	Kenny Dalglish, John Wark (2), John Robertson, Steve Archibald	36,000	
456	18 June 1982	Estadio Benito Villamarin, Seville (N)	Brazil	1–4	World Cup	David Narey	47,379	
457	22 June 1982	Estadio La Rosaleda, Málaga (N)	Soviet Union	2–2	World Cup	Joe Jordan, Graeme Souness	45,000	
458	13 October 1982	Hampden Park, Glasgow (H)	East Germany	2–0	Euro 1984 qualifying	John Wark, Paul Sturrock	40,355	
459	17 November 1982	Wankdorf Stadion, Bern (A)	Switzerland	0–2	Euro 1984 qualifying		26,000	
460	15 December 1982	Stade Heysel, Brussels (A)	Belgium	2–3	Euro 1984 qualifying	Kenny Dalglish (2)	48,877	
461	30 March 1983	Hampden Park, Glasgow (H)	Switzerland	2–2	Euro 1984 qualifying	John Wark, Charlie Nicholas	36,923	
462	24 May 1983	Hampden Park, Glasgow (H)	Northern Ireland	0–0	British Home Championship		16,238	
463	28 May 1983	Ninian Park, Cardiff (A)	Wales	2–0	British Home Championship	Andy Gray, Alan Brazil	14,100	
464	1 June 1983	Wembley Stadium, London (A)	England	0–2	British Home Championship		84,000	
465	12 June 1983	Empire Stadium, Vancouver (A)	Canada	2–0	Friendly	Gordon Strachan, Mark McGhee	14,942	
466	16 June 1983	Commonwealth Stadium, Edmonton (A)	Canada	3–0	Friendly	Charlie Nicholas, Richard Gough, Graeme Souness	12,258	
467	19 June 1983	Varsity Stadium, Toronto (A)	Canada	2–0	Friendly	Andy Gray (2)	15,500	
468	21 September 1983	Hampden Park, Glasgow (H)	Uruguay	2–0	Friendly	John Robertson, Davie Dodds	20,545	
469	12 October 1983	Hampden Park, Glasgow (H)	Belgium	1–1	Euro 1984 qualifying	Charlie Nicholas	23,475	
470	16 November 1983	Kurt-Wabbel Stadion, Halle (A)	East Germany	1–2	Euro 1984 qualifying	Eamonn Bannon	18,000	
471	13 December 1983	Windsor Park, Belfast (A)	Northern Ireland	0–2	British Home Championship		10,000	
472	28 February 1984	Hampden Park, Glasgow (H)	Wales	2–1	British Home Championship	Davie Cooper, Mo Johnston	21,542	
473	26 May 1984	Hampden Park, Glasgow (H)	England	1–1	British Home Championship	Mark McGhee	73,064	
474	1 June 1984	Stade Vélodrome, Marseille (A)	France	0–2	Friendly		24,641	
475	12 September 1984	Hampden Park, Glasgow (H)	Yugoslavia	6–1	Friendly	Davie Cooper, Graeme Souness, Kenny Dalglish, Paul Sturrock, Mo Johnston, Charlie Nicholas	18,512	
476	17 October 1984	Hampden Park, Glasgow (H)	Iceland	3–0	World Cup qualification	Paul McStay (2), Charlie Nicholas	52,829	
477	14 November 1984	Hampden Park, Glasgow (H)	Spain	3–1	World Cup qualification	Mo Johnston (2), Kenny Dalglish	74,299	
478	27 February 1985	Estadio Sanchez Pizjuan, Seville (A)	Spain	0–1	World Cup qualification		70,410	
479	27 March 1985	Hampden Park, Glasgow (H)	Wales	0–1	World Cup qualification		62,444	
480	25 May 1985	Hampden Park, Glasgow (H)	England	1–0	Rous Cup	Richard Gough	66,489	
481	28 May 1985	Laugardalsvollur, Reykjavík (A)	Iceland	1–0	World Cup qualification	Jim Bett	15,000	
482	10 September 1985	Ninian Park, Cardiff (A)	Wales	1–1	World Cup qualification	Davie Cooper	39,500	
483	16 October 1985	Hampden Park, Glasgow (H)	East Germany	0–0	Friendly		41,114	
484	20 November 1985	Hampden Park, Glasgow (H)	Australia	2–0	World Cup qualification	Davie Cooper, Frank McAvennie	63,500	
485	4 December 1985	Olympic Park Stadium, Melbourne (A)	Australia	0–0	World Cup qualification		32,000	
486	28 January 1986	National Stadium, Ramat Gan (A)	Israel	1–0	Friendly	Paul McStay	7,000	
487	26 March 1986	Hampden Park, Glasgow (H)	Romania	3–0	Friendly	Gordon Strachan, Richard Gough, Roy Aitken	53,589	
488	23 April 1986	Wembley Stadium, London (A)	England	1–2	Rous Cup	Graeme Souness	68,357	
489	29 April 1986	Philips Stadion, Eindhoven (A)	Netherlands	0–0	Friendly		14,500	
490	4 June 1986	Neza Stadium, Nezahualcoyotl (N)	Denmark	0–1	World Cup		18,000	
491	8 June 1986	Estadio Corregidora, Querétaro (N)	West Germany	1–2	World Cup	Gordon Strachan	30,000	
492	13 June 1986	Neza Stadium, Nezahualcoyotl (N)	Uruguay	0–0	World Cup		15,000	
493	10 September 1986	Hampden Park, Glasgow (H)	Bulgaria	0–0	Euro 1988 qualifying		35,076	
494	15 October 1986	Lansdowne Road, Dublin (A)	Republic of Ireland	0–0	Euro 1988 qualifying		48,000	
495	12 November 1986	Hampden Park, Glasgow (H)	Luxembourg	3–0	Euro 1988 qualifying	Davie Cooper (2), Mo Johnston	35,078	
496	18 February 1987	Hampden Park, Glasgow (H)	Republic of Ireland	0–1	Euro 1988 qualifying		45,081	
497	1 April 1987	Constant Vanden Stock Stadium, Brussels (A)	Belgium	1–4	Euro 1988 qualifying	Paul McStay	26,650	
498	23 May 1987	Hampden Park, Glasgow (H)	England	0–0	Rous Cup		64,713	
499	26 May 1987	Hampden Park, Glasgow (H)	Brazil	0–2	Rous Cup		41,384	
500	9 September 1987	Hampden Park, Glasgow (H)	Hungary	2–0	Friendly	Ally McCoist (2)	21,128	
501	14 October 1987	Hampden Park, Glasgow (H)	Belgium	2–0	Euro 1988 qualifying	Ally McCoist, Paul McStay	20,052	
502	11 November 1987	Vasil Levski National Stadium, Sofia (A)	Bulgaria	1–0	Euro 1988 qualifying	Gary Mackay	49,976	
503	2 December 1987	Stade de la Frontière, Esch-sur-Alzette (A)	Luxembourg	0–0	Euro 1988 qualifying		1,999	
504	17 February 1988	King Fahd Stadium, Riyadh (A)	Saudi Arabia	2–2	Friendly	Mo Johnston, John Collins	20,000	
505	22 March 1988	National Stadium, Ta'Qali (A)	Malta	1–1	Friendly	Graeme Sharp	8,000	
506	27 April 1988	Estadio Santiago Bernabéu, Madrid (A)	Spain	0–0	Friendly		15,000	
507	17 May 1988	Hampden Park, Glasgow (H)	Colombia	0–0	Rous Cup		20,489	
508	21 May 1988	Wembley Stadium, London (A)	England	0–1	Rous Cup		70,480	
509	14 September 1988	Ullevaal Stadion, Oslo (A)	Norway	2–1	World Cup qualification	Paul McStay, Mo Johnston	22,769	
510	19 October 1988	Hampden Park, Glasgow (H)	Yugoslavia	1–1	World Cup qualification	Mo Johnston	42,771	
511	22 December 1988	Stadio Renato Curi, Perugia (A)	Italy	0–2	Friendly		25,600	
512	8 February 1989	Tsirion Stadium, Limassol (A)	Cyprus	3–2	World Cup qualification	Mo Johnston, Richard Gough (2)	25,000	
513	8 March 1989	Hampden Park, Glasgow (H)	France	2–0	World Cup qualification	Mo Johnston (2)	65,204	
514	26 April 1989	Hampden Park, Glasgow (H)	Cyprus	2–1	World Cup qualification	Mo Johnston, Ally McCoist	50,081	
515	27 May 1989	Hampden Park, Glasgow (H)	England	0–2	Rous Cup		63,282	
516	30 May 1989	Hampden Park, Glasgow (H)	Chile	2–0	Rous Cup	Alan McInally, Murdo MacLeod	9,006	
517	6 September 1989	Maksimir Stadion, Zagreb (A)	Yugoslavia	1–3	World Cup qualification	Gordon Durie	42,500	
518	11 October 1989	Parc des Princes, Paris (A)	France	0–3	World Cup qualification		25,000	
519	15 November 1989	Hampden Park, Glasgow (H)	Norway	1–1	World Cup qualification	Ally McCoist	61,753	
520	28 March 1990	Hampden Park, Glasgow (H)	Argentina	1–0	Friendly	Stewart McKimmie	46,535	
521	25 April 1990	Hampden Park, Glasgow (H)	East Germany	0–1	Friendly		21,868	
522	16 May 1990	Pittodrie Stadium, Aberdeen (H)	Egypt	1–3	Friendly	Ally McCoist	23,000	
523	19 May 1990	Hampden Park, Glasgow (H)	Poland	1–1	Friendly	Mo Johnston	25,142	
524	28 May 1990	National Stadium, Ta'Qali (A)	Malta	2–1	Friendly	Alan McInally (2)	3,000	
525	11 June 1990	Stadio Luigi Ferraris, Genoa (N)	Costa Rica	0–1	World Cup		30,867	
526	16 June 1990	Stadio Luigi Ferraris, Genoa (N)	Sweden	2–1	World Cup	Stuart McCall, Mo Johnston	31,823	
527	20 June 1990	Stadio Delle Alpi, Turin (N)	Brazil	0–1	World Cup		62,502	
528	12 September 1990	Hampden Park, Glasgow (H)	Romania	2–1	Euro 1992 qualifying	John Robertson, Ally McCoist	12,800	
529	17 October 1990	Hampden Park, Glasgow (H)	Switzerland	2–1	Euro 1992 qualifying	John Robertson, Gary McAllister	27,740	
530	14 November 1990	Vasil Levski National Stadium, Sofia (A)	Bulgaria	1–1	Euro 1992 qualifying	Ally McCoist	42,000	
531	6 February 1991	Ibrox Stadium, Glasgow (H)	Soviet Union	0–1	Friendly		20,763	
532	27 March 1991	Hampden Park, Glasgow (H)	Bulgaria	1–1	Euro 1992 qualifying	John Collins	33,119	
533	1 May 1991	Stadio Olimpico, Serravalle (A)	San Marino	2–0	Euro 1992 qualifying	Gordon Strachan, Gordon Durie	3,512	
534	11 September 1991	Wankdorf Stadion, Bern (A)	Switzerland	2–2	Euro 1992 qualifying	Gordon Durie, Ally McCoist	48,000	
535	16 October 1991	Stadionul Steaua, Bucharest (A)	Romania	0–1	Euro 1992 qualifying		30,000	
536	13 November 1991	Hampden Park, Glasgow (H)	San Marino	4–0	Euro 1992 qualifying	Paul McStay, Richard Gough, Gordon Durie, Ally McCoist	35,170	
537	18 February 1992	Hampden Park, Glasgow (H)	Northern Ireland	1–0	Friendly	Ally McCoist	13,650	
538	25 March 1992	Hampden Park, Glasgow (H)	Finland	1–1	Friendly	Paul McStay	9,275	
539	17 May 1992	Mile High Stadium, Denver (A)	United States	1–0	Friendly	Pat Nevin	24,157	
540	20 May 1992	Varsity Stadium, Toronto (A)	Canada	3–1	Friendly	Gary McAllister (2), Ally McCoist	10,872	
541	3 June 1992	Ullevaal Stadion, Oslo (A)	Norway	0–0	Friendly		8,776	
542	12 June 1992	Ullevi Stadion, Gothenburg (N)	Netherlands	0–1	Euro 1992		35,720	
543	15 June 1992	Idrottsparken, Norrköping (N)	Germany	0–2	Euro 1992		17,638	
544	18 June 1992	Idrottsparken, Norrköping (N)	CIS	3–0	Euro 1992	Paul McStay, Brian McClair, Gary McAllister	14,660	
545	9 September 1992	Wankdorf Stadion, Bern (A)	Switzerland	1–3	World Cup qualification	Ally McCoist	12,000	
546	14 October 1992	Ibrox Stadium, Glasgow (H)	Portugal	0–0	World Cup qualification		22,583	
547	18 November 1992	Ibrox Stadium, Glasgow (H)	Italy	0–0	World Cup qualification		33,029	
548	17 February 1993	Ibrox Stadium, Glasgow (H)	Malta	3–0	World Cup qualification	Ally McCoist (2), Pat Nevin	35,490	
549	24 March 1993	Ibrox Stadium, Glasgow (H)	Germany	0–1	Friendly		36,400	
550	28 April 1993	Estádio da Luz, Lisbon (A)	Portugal	0–5	World Cup qualification		28,000	
551	19 May 1993	Kadrioru Stadium, Tallinn (A)	Estonia	3–0	World Cup qualification	Kevin Gallacher, John Collins, Scott Booth	5,100	
552	2 June 1993	Pittodrie Stadium, Aberdeen (H)	Estonia	3–1	World Cup qualification	Brian McClair, Pat Nevin (2)	14,309	
553	8 September 1993	Pittodrie Stadium, Aberdeen (H)	Switzerland	1–1	World Cup qualification	John Collins	24,000	
554	13 October 1993	Stadio Olimpico, Rome (A)	Italy	1–3	World Cup qualification	Kevin Gallacher	61,178	
555	17 November 1993	National Stadium, Ta'Qali (A)	Malta	2–0	World Cup qualification	Billy McKinlay, Colin Hendry	8,000	
556	23 March 1994	Hampden Park, Glasgow (H)	Netherlands	0–1	Friendly		36,809	
557	20 April 1994	Ernst-Happel-Stadion, Vienna (A)	Austria	2–1	Friendly	John McGinlay, Billy McKinlay	35,000	
558	27 May 1994	Galgenwaard Stadion, Utrecht (A)	Netherlands	1–3	Friendly	Duncan Shearer	17,500	
559	7 September 1994	Olympic Stadium, Helsinki (A)	Finland	2–0	Euro 1996 qualifying	Duncan Shearer, John Collins	12,845	
560	12 October 1994	Hampden Park, Glasgow (H)	Faroe Islands	5–1	Euro 1996 qualifying	John McGinlay, Scott Booth, John Collins (2), Billy McKinlay	20,885	
561	16 November 1994	Hampden Park, Glasgow (H)	Russia	1–1	Euro 1996 qualifying	Scott Booth	31,254	
562	18 December 1994	Olympiako Stadio, Athens (A)	Greece	0–1	Euro 1996 qualifying		7,976	
563	29 March 1995	Luzhniki Stadium, Moscow (A)	Russia	0–0	Euro 1996 qualifying		13,939	
564	26 April 1995	Stadio Olimpico, Serravalle (A)	San Marino	2–0	Euro 1996 qualifying	John Collins, Colin Calderwood	2,738	
565	21 May 1995	Big Arch Stadium, Hiroshima (A)	Japan	0–0	Kirin Cup		24,566	
566	24 May 1995	Toyama Park Stadium, Toyama (N)	Ecuador	2–1	Kirin Cup	John Robertson, Stevie Crawford	5,669	
567	7 June 1995	Svangaskarð, Toftir (A)	Faroe Islands	2–0	Euro 1996 qualifying	Billy McKinlay, John McGinlay	3,881	
568	16 August 1995	Hampden Park, Glasgow (H)	Greece	1–0	Euro 1996 qualifying	Ally McCoist	34,910	
569	6 September 1995	Hampden Park, Glasgow (H)	Finland	1–0	Euro 1996 qualifying	Scott Booth	35,018	
570	11 October 1995	Rasunda Stadion, Solna (A)	Sweden	0–2	Friendly		19,121	
571	15 November 1995	Hampden Park, Glasgow (H)	San Marino	5–0	Euro 1996 qualifying	Eoin Jess, Scott Booth, Ally McCoist, Pat Nevin, Own goal	30,306	
572	27 March 1996	Hampden Park, Glasgow (H)	Australia	1–0	Friendly	Ally McCoist	20,608	
573	24 April 1996	Parken Stadium, Copenhagen (A)	Denmark	0–2	Friendly		23,031	
574	26 May 1996	Veterans Stadium, New Britain (A)	United States	1–2	Friendly	Gordon Durie	8,526	
575	29 May 1996	Orange Bowl, Miami (N)	Colombia	0–1	Friendly		5,000	
576	10 June 1996	Villa Park, Birmingham (N)	Netherlands	0–0	Euro 1996		34,363	
577	15 June 1996	Wembley Stadium, London (A)	England	0–2	Euro 1996		76,864	
578	18 June 1996	Villa Park, Birmingham (N)	Switzerland	1–0	Euro 1996	Ally McCoist	34,926	
579	31 August 1996	Ernst-Happel-Stadion, Vienna (A)	Austria	0–0	World Cup qualification		29,500	
580	5 October 1996	Stadionas Daugava, Riga (A)	Latvia	2–0	World Cup qualification	John Collins, Darren Jackson	9,500	
581	10 November 1996	Ibrox Stadium, Glasgow (H)	Sweden	1–0	World Cup qualification	John McGinlay	46,738	
582	11 February 1997	Stade Louis II, Monaco (N) (Note: The match was scheduled for 9 October 1996 in Tallinn, Estonia. Scotland trained at the Kadrioru Staadion the night before the game, but were dissatisfied by the floodlighting at the venue. After a meeting of the FIFA executive committee the following morning, the 18:45 EET kick-off time was moved to 15:00 EET. Estonia were unhappy with the logistical consequences of the switch and refused to turn up. Scotland turned up at the appointed time and kicked off without opposition, prompting the visiting Tartan Army to chant that there was only One team in Tallinn. The referee then blew his whistle to stop the game. It appeared from the rules that Scotland should have been awarded a 3-0 victory, but FIFA decided to replay the match in Monaco on 11 February 1997.)	Estonia	0–0	World Cup qualification		3,766	
583	29 March 1997	Rugby Park, Kilmarnock (H)	Estonia	2–0	World Cup qualification	Tom Boyd, Own goal	17,996	
584	2 April 1997	Celtic Park, Glasgow (H)	Austria	2–0	World Cup qualification	Kevin Gallacher (2)	43,295	
585	30 April 1997	Ullevi Stadion, Gothenburg (A)	Sweden	1–2	World Cup qualification	Kevin Gallacher	40,302	
586	27 May 1997	Rugby Park, Kilmarnock (H)	Wales	0–1	Friendly		9,013	
587	1 June 1997	National Stadium, Ta'Qali (A)	Malta	3–2	Friendly	Christian Dailly, Darren Jackson (2)	3,500	
588	8 June 1997	Dinamo Stadium, Minsk (A)	Belarus	1–0	World Cup qualification	Gary McAllister	12,000	
589	7 September 1997	Pittodrie Stadium, Aberdeen (H)	Belarus	4–1	World Cup qualification	Kevin Gallacher (2), David Hopkin (2)	20,160	
590	11 October 1997	Celtic Park, Glasgow (H)	Latvia	2–0	World Cup qualification	Kevin Gallacher, Gordon Durie	47,613	
591	12 November 1997	Stade Geoffroy-Guichard, Saint-Étienne (A)	France	1–2	Friendly	Gordon Durie	19,514	
592	25 March 1998	Ibrox Stadium, Glasgow (H)	Denmark	0–1	Friendly		26,468	
593	22 April 1998	Easter Road, Edinburgh (H)	Finland	1–1	Friendly	Darren Jackson	14,315	
594	23 May 1998	Giants Stadium, East Rutherford (N)	Colombia	2–2	Friendly	John Collins, Craig Burley	56,404	
595	30 May 1998	RFK Memorial Stadium, Washington, D.C. (A)	United States	0–0	Friendly		46,037	
596	10 June 1998	Stade de France, Saint-Denis (N)	Brazil	1–2	World Cup	John Collins	80,000	
597	16 June 1998	Stade Lescure, Bordeaux (N)	Norway	1–1	World Cup	Craig Burley	30,236	
598	23 June 1998	Stade Geoffroy-Guichard, Saint-Étienne (N)	Morocco	0–3	World Cup		33,266	
599	5 September 1998	Žalgiris Stadium, Vilnius (A)	Lithuania	0–0	Euro 2000 qualifying		4,500	
600	10 October 1998	Tynecastle Stadium, Edinburgh (H)	Estonia	3–2	Euro 2000 qualifying	Billy Dodds (2), Own goal	16,930	
601	14 October 1998	Pittodrie Stadium, Aberdeen (H)	Faroe Islands	2–1	Euro 2000 qualifying	Craig Burley, Billy Dodds	18,517	
602	31 March 1999	Celtic Park, Glasgow (H)	Czech Republic	1–2	Euro 2000 qualifying	Eoin Jess	44,513	
603	28 April 1999	Weserstadion, Bremen (A)	Germany	1–0	Friendly	Don Hutchison	27,000	
604	5 June 1999	Svangaskarð, Toftir (A)	Faroe Islands	1–1	Euro 2000 qualifying	Allan Johnston	4,100	
605	9 June 1999	Sparta Stadion, Prague (A)	Czech Republic	2–3	Euro 2000 qualifying	Paul Ritchie, Allan Johnston	21,000	
606	4 September 1999	Olimpijski Stadion, Sarajevo (A)	Bosnia and Herzegovina	2–1	Euro 2000 qualifying	Don Hutchison, Billy Dodds	26,000	
607	8 September 1999	Kadrioru Stadium, Tallinn (A)	Estonia	0–0	Euro 2000 qualifying		4,500	
608	5 October 1999	Ibrox Stadium, Glasgow (H)	Bosnia and Herzegovina	1–0	Euro 2000 qualifying	John Collins	30,574	
609	9 October 1999	Hampden Park, Glasgow (H)	Lithuania	3–0	Euro 2000 qualifying	Don Hutchison, Gary McSwegan, Colin Cameron	22,059	
610	13 November 1999	Hampden Park, Glasgow (H)	England	0–2	Euro 2000 qualifying		50,132	
611	17 November 1999	Wembley Stadium, London (A)	England	1–0	Euro 2000 qualifying	Don Hutchison	75,848	

== Record by opponent ==
Team	Pld	W	D	L	GF	GA	GD	WPCT
Argentina	1	1	0	0	1	0	+1	100.00
Australia	3	2	1	0	3	0	+3	66.67
Austria	3	2	1	0	4	1	+3	66.67
Belarus	2	2	0	0	5	1	+4	100.00
Belgium	4	1	1	2	6	8	−2	25.00
Bosnia and Herzegovina	2	2	0	0	3	1	+2	100.00
Brazil	4	0	0	4	2	9	−7	0.00
Bulgaria	4	1	3	0	3	2	+1	25.00
Canada	4	4	0	0	10	1	+9	100.00
Chile	1	1	0	0	2	0	+2	100.00
CIS	1	1	0	0	3	0	+3	100.00
Colombia	3	0	2	1	2	3	−1	0.00
Costa Rica	1	0	0	1	0	1	−1	0.00
Cyprus	2	2	0	0	5	3	+2	100.00
Czech Republic	2	0	0	2	3	5	−2	0.00
Denmark	3	0	0	3	0	4	−4	0.00
East Germany	4	1	1	2	3	3	0	25.00
Ecuador	1	1	0	0	2	1	+1	100.00
Egypt	1	0	0	1	1	3	−2	0.00
England	13	3	2	8	5	15	−10	23.08
Estonia	6	4	2	0	11	3	+8	66.67
Faroe Islands	4	3	1	0	10	3	+7	75.00
Finland	4	2	2	0	5	2	+3	50.00
France	4	1	0	3	3	7	−4	25.00
Germany	3	1	0	2	1	3	−2	33.33
Greece	2	1	0	1	1	1	0	50.00
Hungary	2	1	0	1	3	3	0	50.00
Iceland	2	2	0	0	4	0	+4	100.00
Israel	3	3	0	0	5	1	+4	100.00
Italy	3	0	1	2	1	5	−4	0.00
Japan	1	0	1	0	0	0	0	0.00
Latvia	2	2	0	0	4	0	+4	100.00
Lithuania	2	1	1	0	3	0	+3	50.00
Luxembourg	2	1	1	0	3	0	+3	50.00
Malta	5	4	1	0	11	4	+7	80.00
Morocco	1	0	0	1	0	3	−3	0.00
Netherlands	6	1	2	3	3	6	−3	16.67
New Zealand	1	1	0	0	5	2	+3	100.00
Northern Ireland	8	2	4	2	5	5	0	25.00
Norway	4	1	3	0	4	3	+1	25.00
Poland	2	0	1	1	1	2	−1	0.00
Portugal	5	1	2	2	5	8	−3	20.00
Republic of Ireland	2	0	1	1	0	1	−1	0.00
Romania	3	2	0	1	5	2	+3	66.67
Russia	2	0	2	0	1	1	0	0.00
San Marino	4	4	0	0	13	0	+13	100.00
Saudi Arabia	1	0	1	0	2	2	0	0.00
Soviet Union	2	0	1	1	2	3	−1	0.00
Spain	4	1	1	2	3	5	−2	25.00
Sweden	6	4	0	2	7	5	+2	66.67
Switzerland	7	2	3	2	9	11	−2	28.57
United States	3	1	1	1	2	2	0	33.33
Uruguay	2	1	1	0	2	0	+2	50.00
Wales	8	4	1	3	7	6	+1	50.00
West Germany	1	0	0	1	1	2	−1	0.00
Yugoslavia	3	1	1	1	8	5	+3	33.33
Total	179	76	46	57	213	167	+46	42.46

Source: Results

== British Home Championship record by season ==
The British Home Championship was discontinued after the 1983–84 season.

Year	Placing
1979–80	4th
1980–81	Incomplete (Note: The 1981 British Home Championship was not completed. Two matches that were scheduled to be played in Belfast were cancelled due to civil unrest in Northern Ireland.)
1981–82	2nd
1982–83	2nd
1983–84	4th
