= Stadium relocations in Scottish football =

Over the 150-year history of football in Scotland, most teams have occupied several grounds as their home; this has occasionally involved a relocation to another community altogether. Grounds which have been in continuous use for several decades have been extensively redeveloped, particularly since the 1990s, with a few exceptions. This article and the accompanying tables focus on those Scottish Football League / Scottish Professional Football League clubs which have moved to a different stadium, including temporarily, since the 1980s when this became more frequent.

== Background ==
=== 20th century ===
The 1971 Ibrox disaster, in which 66 supporters were killed on an exit stairway with an old, unsafe design led to Rangers redeveloping their Ibrox Park over the next decade, replacing most of the terracing areas with seated grandstands, based on the Westfalenstadion in Dortmund. It was the first major modernisation of a football stadium in Scotland for decades.

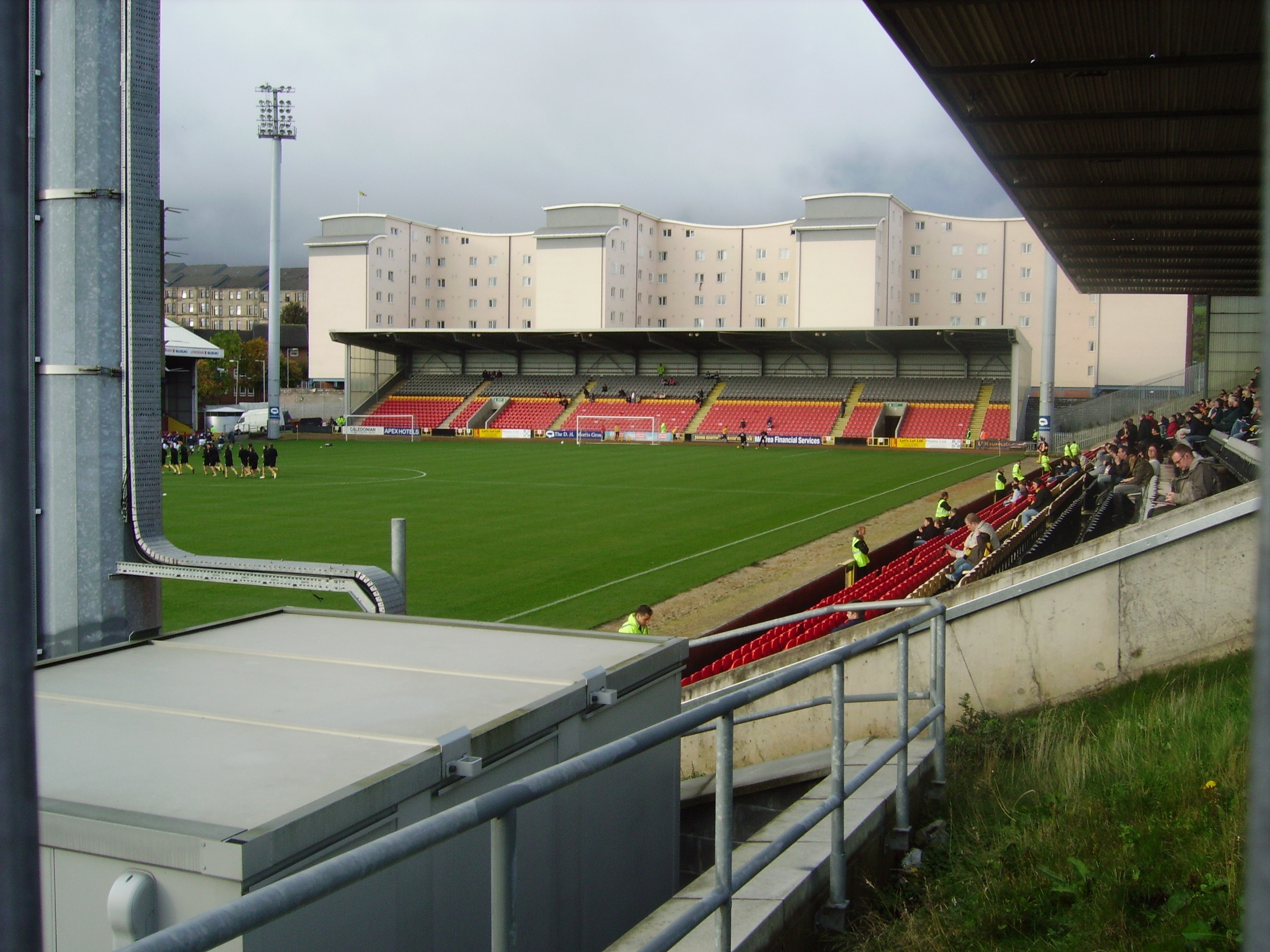
Partick Thistle rebuilt two stands at Firhill Stadium and hosted two other clubs who had been made homeless.

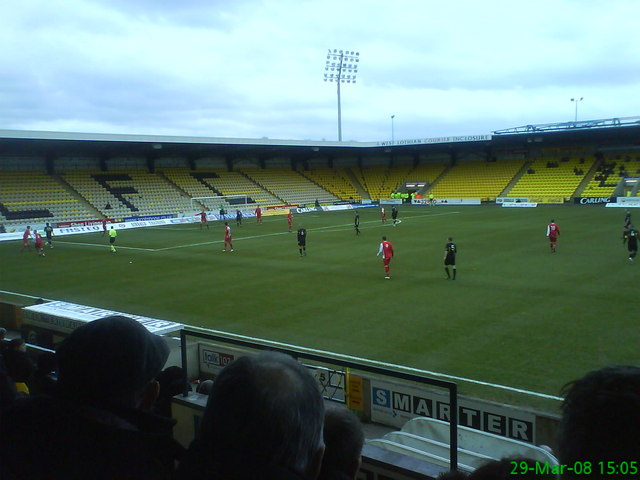
Almondvale Stadium was built to provide 10,000 seats as required at the time, however attendances rarely exceed half of that total.

In 1986, Clyde became the first of several senior clubs to leave the stadium where they had played since the early years of the sport (1898 in their case); unusually in Scotland they did not own Shawfield Stadium, and the greyhound racing company which were the owners aimed to sell it for redevelopment (which never came to pass) and the football team was evicted. It was the first in what would be a complicated and protracted series of relocations during the final years of the 20th and the outset of the 21st century. For Clyde, eight years of ground-sharing followed before their new home in Cumbernauld – ten miles from their old base in Rutherglen – was ready in 1994 (even then, it was still owned by the local authority rather than the club).

By that time, the 1989 Hillsborough disaster had taken place, and its subsequent inquiry recommended all-seater stadia at the elite professional level, something the Scottish Football League adopted as a rule, requiring almost all Scottish clubs to either upgrade their ageing stadia or construct new ones to comply with the new legislation (for example, both Easter Road and Tynecastle were entirely rebuilt in stages over the next 20 or so years, with Hearts playing a small number of home matches at the neighbouring Murrayfield rugby stadium in the final phase of work). Celtic spent one season – 1994–95 – away from home at Hampden Park (between the national stadium's own periods of extensive renovation that required several national cup finals and Scotland fixtures to be played at the other large Glasgow venues) which was familiar to many of the players from internationals and cup fixtures; indeed, the last match of their spell at Hampden before returning to a half-completed Celtic Park was the 1995 Scottish Cup Final, which they won. The sums spent by Celtic and others to modernise their stadia in that era was in contrast to Rangers who had carried out their major upgrades some years earlier, and this extra revenue was reflected in the Gers' dominance on the field in those years.

Several middle-order teams such as Partick Thistle endured financial hardship modernising their ground, exacerbated by a requirement of the new Scottish Premier League in 1998 (although it was actually set in place in 1994 with clubs given the intervening years to comply) stipulating that a ground had to have 10,000 seats, far more than the average attendance of all but a handful of its members.

A worse fate befell Airdrieonians who vacated their traditional Broomfield Park in 1994, had to wait four years for their new SPL-compliant Excelsior Stadium to be finished, then were out of business by 2002, unable to repay the cost of its construction. In their final match away to Ayr United, some Airdrie supporters staged a destructive pitch invasion at Somerset Park – the Ayr chairman happened to own the construction company which built Excelsior Stadium and was thus a major creditor of Airdrieonians; however his club had not been burdened with the costly disruption of stadium rebuilding, and nor would any major changes be seen at Somerset Park in the subsequent fifteen years. A team continues to play in Airdrie, but at the time of its formation, Airdrie United was technically a rebranding of Clydebank, another club which had vacated its old home and spent six seasons playing in Dumbarton and Greenock, with its attendance numbers dwindling all the while. The Bankies fans formed a phoenix club of the same name to compete in the Junior leagues.

Having been landlords to Clyde in the 1980s, Hamilton Academical almost went the way of Airdrieonians when their new stadium took seven years to materialise; it took the intervention of some Glasgow investors (who had previously been at the helm of Clyde) to stabilise the Accies financially, and their youth-focused business model saw the club reach the top tier within a decade.

=== 21st century ===
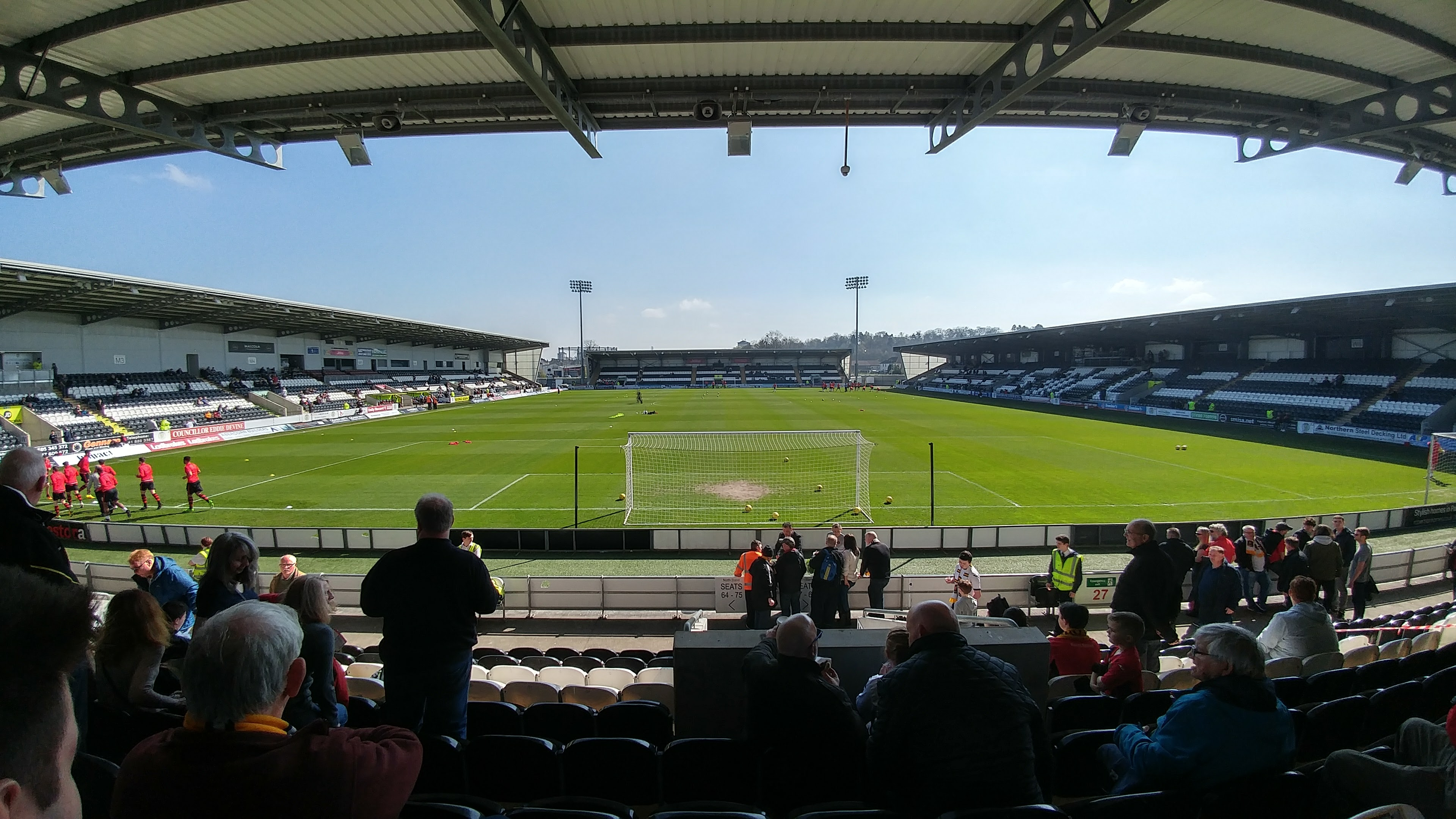
St Mirren Park is the most recent new stadium for a top-division club in Scotland, completed in 2009.

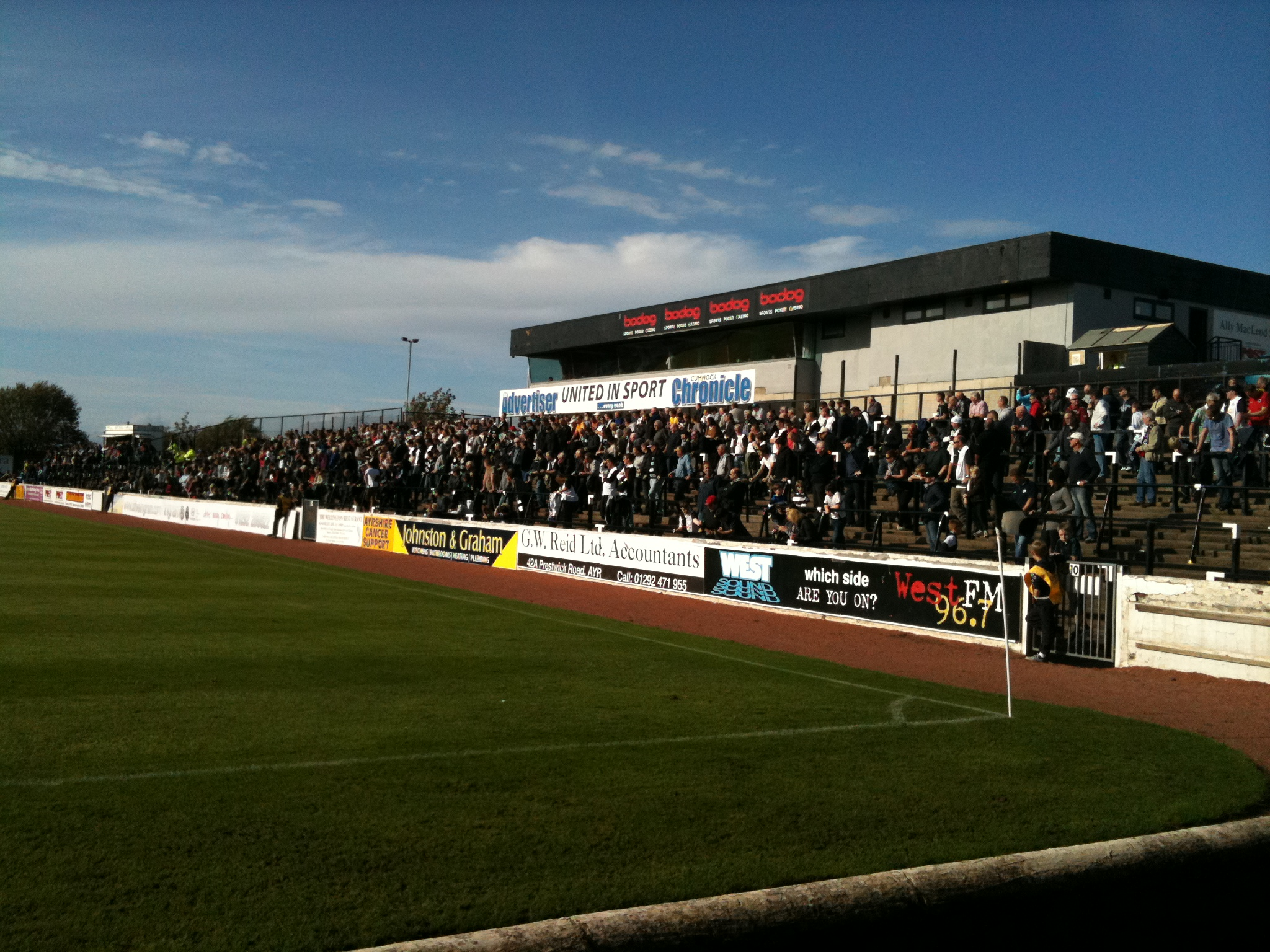
Somerset Park in Ayr (pictured in 2011 prior to redevelopment in 2024) is an old stadium with a majority of terracing but would now meet SPFL Premiership entry requirements

Falkirk were denied promotion in 2000 (Aberdeen being spared possible relegation in a play-off) and 2003 (Motherwell reprieved) due to the condition of Brockville Park before they sold the town centre site for the construction of a supermarket (as Airdrie and Hamilton had done), sharing with Stenhousemuir for one year while their new stadium on the edge of town was being built. The Bairns were angered when Inverness Caledonian Thistle, who already had a new stadium but not of sufficient size, were allowed to join the SPL for the 2004–05 campaign on a ground-sharing agreement with Aberdeen (100 miles away from their home city), albeit only for six months during expansion work, when Falkirk had been denied such an arrangement with Clyde or Airdrie United the year before. This development caused further annoyance for Partick Thistle as they were the club relegated from the top division when Inverness made their Aberdeen plan. That summer, a reduction in the required seating capacity from 10,000 to 6,000 came into effect which benefitted clubs such Inverness, Falkirk (who gained promotion in the first season in their new stadium) and later Hamilton, as smaller new venues were now acceptable without even having all four sides built up (to reach the lower threshold in 2008, Hamilton erected a 'temporary' stand for 700 which was still in place a decade later).

Gretna also shared with Motherwell, a distance of 100 miles again, during their single campaign in the SPL in 2007–08; the league indicated that such plans would not be considered again due to the very poor condition of the Fir Park pitch as a result of so many matches being played on it.

At either end of this long unsettled period, St Johnstone (in 1989) and St Mirren (2009) both relocated to new grounds with much less upheaval than others mentioned above, due to the fact that the replacements were being constructed before the originals were vacated. This was also true further down the leagues for East Fife (1998) and Dumbarton (2000); however when East Stirlingshire vacated Firs Park in 2008, an intended tenancy of five years at nearby Stenhousemuir became ten years, during which time the club lost their league place, being relegated to the recently introduced Lowland Football League in 2016. In 2018, Shire moved in with Falkirk.

Ayr United's impressive form at the outset of the 2018–19 Scottish Championship season led observers to examine the latest SPFL entry requirements due to the possibility of the club achieving promotion while still based at the unmodernised Somerset Park (all other promoted teams' stadia since the advent of the new league body in 2013 had met the previous SPL seating threshold of 6000, therefore little attention was paid to the matter). It was confirmed that the SPFL statutes only required grounds to have 'bronze standard' facilities (500 covered places), meaning Somerset Park would be accepted as a Premiership venue with minimal improvements. Arbroath, with their similarly unmodernised Gayfield Park, came close to promotion in 2022, while Queen's Park, long associated with playing in a near-empty Hampden, challenged for a Premiership place a year later while groundsharing at Stenhousemuir's Ochilview Park. Ay United made another unsuccessful attempt at promotion in 2025, by which time they had constructed a new stand at Somerset Park.

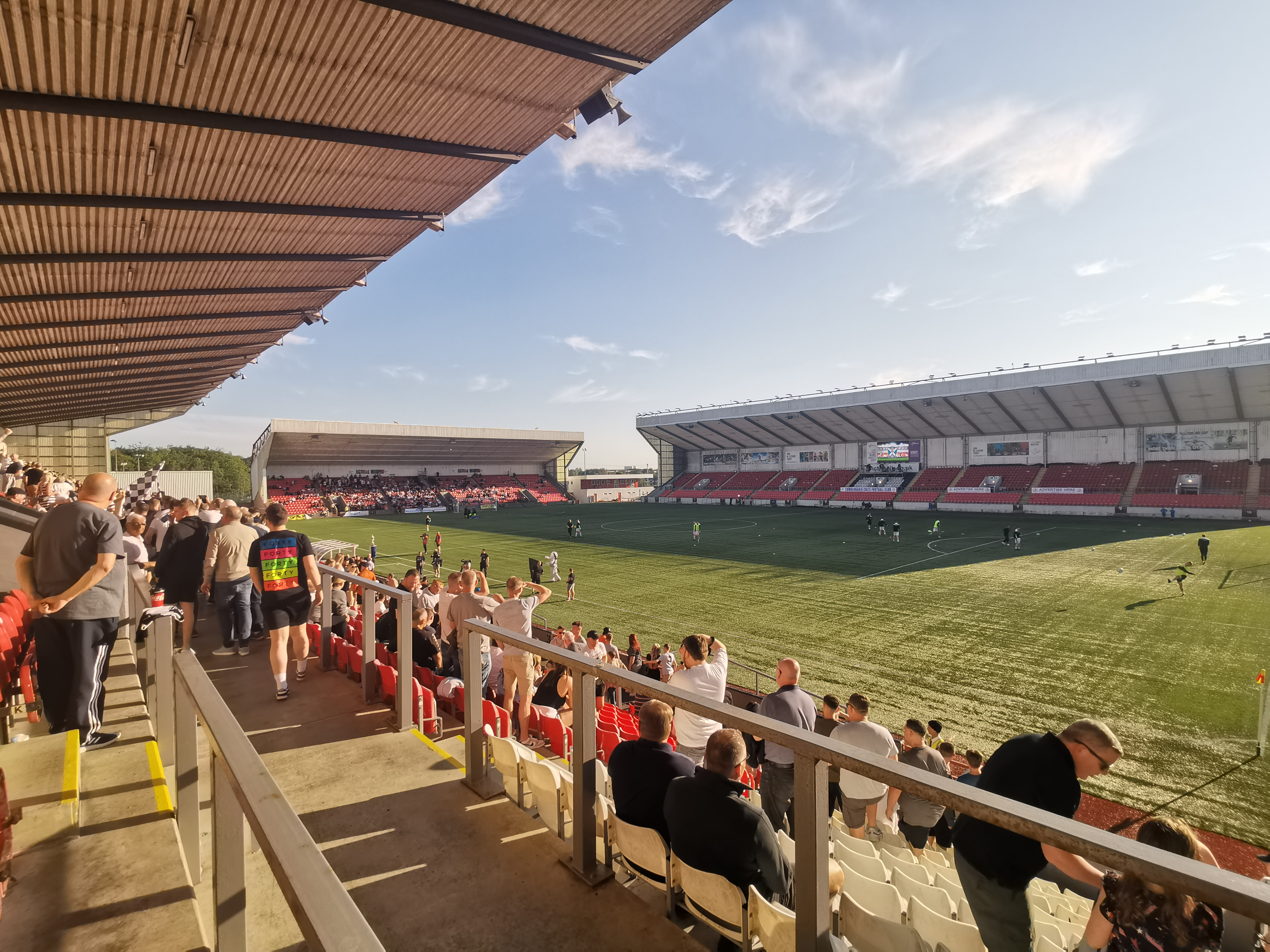
Disputes over tenancies led to Clyde and Hamilton Academical essentially exchanging grounds between Broadwood Stadium (above) and New Douglas Park in the mid-2020s

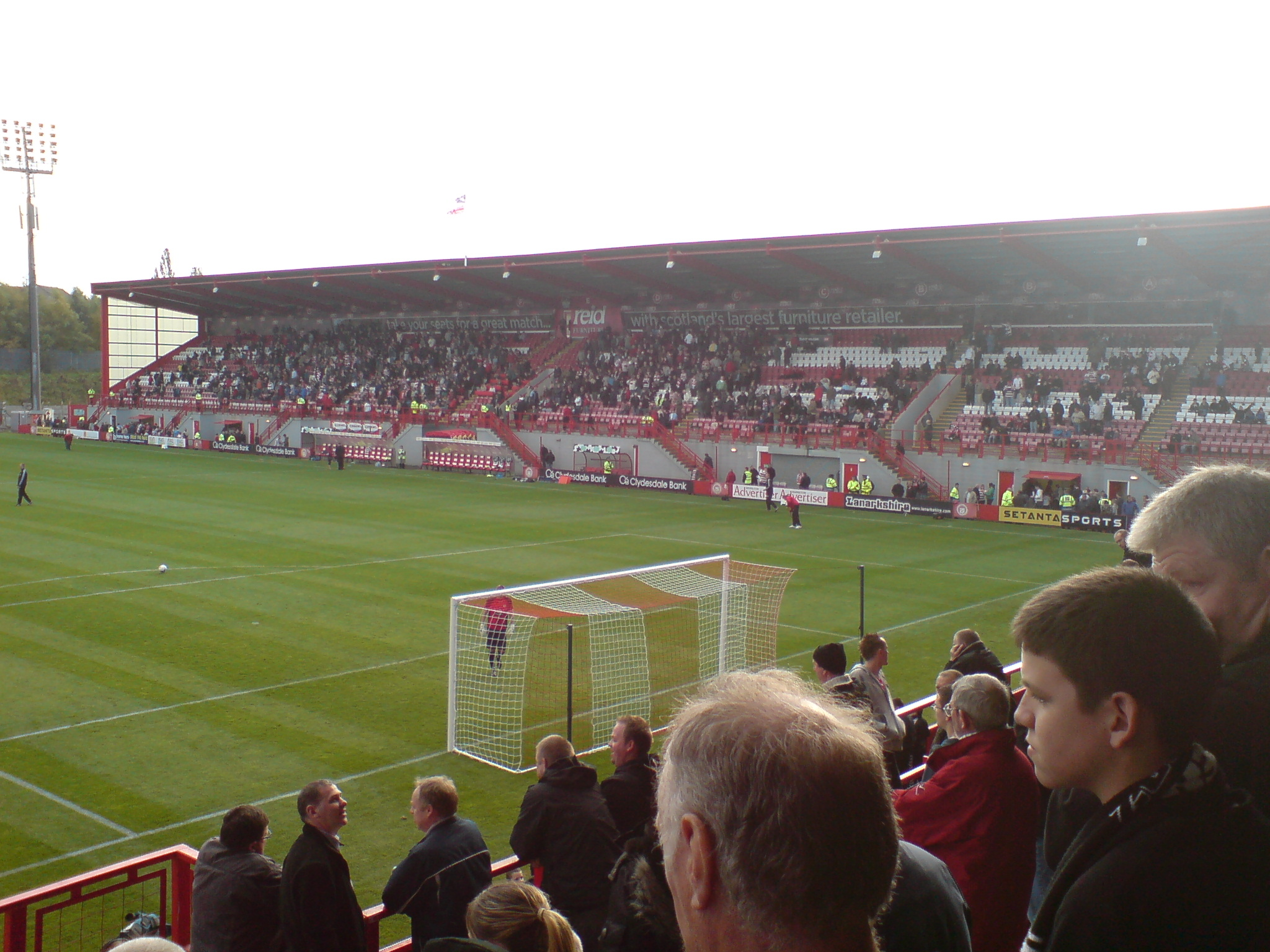

In 2025, Hamilton Academical opted to leave New Douglas Park due to an ongoing dispute with the club's former board members, who still owned the stadium. Accies took up a tenancy at Broadwood in Cumbernauld, leaving Clyde (who had departed Broadwood in 2022 and taken up a groundshare at New Douglas Park while seeking a new home in Glasgow) as the only club playing out of Hamilton.

== Temporary relocations ==
Club	Previous stadium	Left	Reason	Moved to	Landlord	Years	Back
Scotland; Cup finals	Hampden Park	1992 (Note: October 1992)	Extensive reconstruction (Note: Queen's Park were able to continue playing at Hampden during this work as the pitch was not damaged, some of the facilities were accessible and their small attendances did not cause capacity or safety issues.)	Celtic Park; (Note: Celtic Park hosted one 1992–93 Scottish Cup semi-final, the 1993 Scottish Cup Final and the 1993 Scottish League Cup Final.); Ibrox Stadium; (Note: Ibrox hosted one 1993–94 Scottish League Cup semi-final, the 1994 Scottish League Cup Final (as a result of finalists Celtic using Hampden during their own redevelopment) and four Scotland home matches.); Pittodrie Stadium (Note: Pittodrie hosted two Scotland home matches.)	Celtic; Rangers; Aberdeen	1.5	1994 (Note: March 1994)
Celtic	Celtic Park	1994	Extensive reconstruction	Hampden Park	Queen's Park	1	1995
Scotland; Cup finals	Hampden Park	1996 (Note: May 1996)	Extensive reconstruction	Celtic Park; (Note: Celtic Park hosted one 1996–97 Scottish League Cup semi-final, the 1996 Scottish League Cup Final, one 1997–98 Scottish Cup semi-final, the 1998 Scottish Cup Final, one 1998–99 Scottish League Cup semi-final, the 1998 Scottish League Cup Final, one 1998–99 Scottish Cup semi-final and three Scotland home matches.); Ibrox Stadium; (Note: Ibrox hosted a 1996–97 Scottish Cup semi-final and replay, the 1997 Scottish Cup Final, a 1997–98 Scottish League Cup semi-final, the 1997 Scottish League Cup Final, one 1997–98 Scottish Cup semi-final, one 1998–99 Scottish Cup semi-final and three Scotland home matches.); Others (Note: Several stadia were used for Scotland home matches: Pittodrie hosted two, Rugby Park hosted two, Easter Road hosted one, Tynecastle hosted one.)	Celtic; Rangers; Various others	3	1999 (Note: May 1999)
Inverness CT	Caledonian Stadium	2004 (Note: August 2004)	Stadium expansion to meet capacity requirements	Pittodrie Stadium	Aberdeen	0.5	2005 (Note: January 2005)
Gretna	Raydale Park	2007	Did not meet capacity/safety requirements	Fir Park	Motherwell	1	N/A; Club dissolved in summer 2008
Queen's Park; Scotland; Cup finals	Hampden Park	2013	Conversion of use: Athletics at the 2014 Commonwealth Games	Excelsior Stadium; (Note: Excelsior Stadium hosted Queen's Park home matches.); Celtic Park; (Note: Celtic Park hosted the 2014 Scottish League Cup Final, the 2014 Scottish Cup Final and two Scotland home matches.); Ibrox Stadium (Note: Ibrox hosted two 2013–14 Scottish Cup semi-finals and one Scotland home match.)	Airdrieonians; Celtic; Rangers	1.5	2015 (Note: Conversion reversed by January 2015)
Edinburgh City	Meadowbank Stadium	2017	Redevelopment work	Ainslie Park	Spartans	5	2022
Rangers	Ibrox Stadium	2024	Redevelopment work	Hampden Park	Scottish Football Association	1 month	2024

== Indirect relocations ==
Moves to new permanent homes via one or more groundshares. (Note: Cove Rangers's move to Balmoral Stadium in 2018 via Harlaw Park, Inverurie is not included as the club was not in the SPFL at the time.)

Club	Previous stadium	Left	Reason	Moved to	Landlord	Years	New stadium	Back
Clyde	Shawfield Stadium	1986	Evicted by controlling company	Firhill Stadium	Partick Thistle	5	N/A; New groundshare (Douglas Park)	N/A
Clyde	N/A; Previous groundshare (Firhill)	1991	New stadium construction	Douglas Park	Hamilton Academical	3	Broadwood Stadium	1994
Stirling Albion	Annfield Stadium	1992	Sold to developer; New stadium construction	Ochilview Park	Stenhousemuir	1	Forthbank Stadium	1993
Airdrieonians (1878)	Broomfield Park	1994	Sold to developer; New stadium construction	Broadwood Stadium	Clyde	4	Excelsior Stadium	1998
Hamilton Academical	Douglas Park	1994	Sold to developer; New stadium planned	Firhill Stadium	Partick Thistle	3	N/A; New groundshare (Cliftonhill)	N/A
Clydebank	Kilbowie Park	1996	Sold to developer; New stadium planned	Boghead Park	Dumbarton	3	N/A; New groundshare (Cappielow)	N/A
Hamilton Academical	N/A; Previous groundshare (Firhill)	1997	New stadium planned	Cliftonhill	Albion Rovers	2	N/A; New groundshare (Firhill)	N/A
Clydebank	N/A; Previous groundshare (Boghead)	1999	New stadium planned	Cappielow	Greenock Morton	3	Excelsior Stadium (Note: Team relocated and rebranded as Airdrie United to retain existing league place. Stadium previously used by the defunct Airdrieonians .)	2002
Hamilton Academical	N/A; Previous groundshare (Cliftonhill)	1999	New stadium construction	Firhill Stadium	Partick Thistle	2	New Douglas Park	2001
Falkirk	Brockville Park	2003	Sold to developer; New stadium construction	Ochilview Park	Stenhousemuir	1	Falkirk Stadium	2004
East Stirlingshire	Firs Park	2008	New stadium planned	Ochilview Park	Stenhousemuir	10	N/A; New groundshare (Falkirk Stadium) (Note: The groundshare at Falkirk has not been listed separately as East Stirlingshire were not in the SPFL at the time (relegated in 2016).)	N/A
Queen's Park	Hampden Park	2021	Lease on Hampden ended	Firhill (Note: 6 games in April 2021 played at Falkirk Stadium.)	Partick Thistle	1	N/A; New groundshare (Ochilview)	N/A
Clyde	Broadwood Stadium	2022	Lease terminated; New stadium planned	New Douglas Park	Hamilton Academical	TBC	To be confirmed	TBC
Queen's Park	N/A; Previous groundshare (Firhill)	2022	Redevelopment work on Lesser Hampden ongoing	Ochilview Park	Stenhousemuir	1	N/A; New groundshare (Hampden Park)	N/A
Queen's Park	N/A; Previous groundshare (Ochilview)	2023	Redevelopment work on Lesser Hampden ongoing	Hampden Park	Scottish Football Association	2 (Note: Hampden registered as home ground, but some matches played at Lesser due to other events held at Hampden.)	Lesser Hampden	2025
Hamilton Academical	New Douglas Park	2025	Lease terminated; New stadium planned	Broadwood Stadium	North Lanarkshire Council	TBC	To be confirmed	TBC

== Permanent moves ==
Moves which did not involve any substantial period of temporary groundsharing. (Note: Peterhead's move to Balmoor Stadium in 1997 is not included as the club was not in the SFL at the time.)

Club	Previous stadium	Left	New stadium	Notes
St Johnstone	Muirton Park	1989	McDiarmid Park	(Note: McDiarmid Park was the first purpose-built all-seater stadium in the United Kingdom.)
Livingston	Meadowbank Stadium	1995	Almondvale Stadium	(Note: Rebranded from Meadowbank Thistle and relocated from Edinburgh to Livingston, West Lothian.)
Inverness CT	Telford Street Park	1996	Caledonian Stadium	(Note: Followed a merger between Caledonian (who played at Telford Street) and Inverness Thistle in 1994 to gain SFL entry.)
East Fife	Bayview Park	1998	Bayview Stadium	
Dumbarton	Boghead Park	2000	Dumbarton Football Stadium	(Note: Stadium opened 2 December 2000. 9 games from August–November played at Cliftonhill.)
St Mirren	St Mirren Park (Love Street)	2009	St Mirren Park	

== See also ==
- List of football stadiums in Scotland
- List of Scottish Football League stadiums
- List of Scottish Professional Football League stadiums
- History of football in Scotland
- History of the Scotland national football team
- Relocation of association football teams in the United Kingdom
- Scottish football attendance records
