= Scotland national football team results (1960–1979) =

Scotland national football team results
- 1872–1914 (matches 1–113)
- 1920–39 (matches 114–188)
- 1940–59 (matches 189–274)
- 1960–79 (matches 275–432)
- 1980–99 (matches 433–611)
- 2000–19 (matches 612–783)
- 2020–present (matches 784–849)

- Unofficial matches

This article lists the results for the Scotland national football team between 1960 and 1979.

== Key ==
Key to matches

- Att. = Match attendance
- (H) = Home ground
- (A) = Away ground
- (N) = Neutral ground

Key to record by opponent

- Pld = Games played
- W = Games won
- D = Games drawn
- L = Games lost
- GF = Goals for
- GA = Goals against

== Results ==
Scotland's score is shown first in each case.

Match number	Date	Venue	Opponents	Score	Competition	Scotland scorers	Att.	Ref.
275	9 April 1960	Hampden Park, Glasgow (H)	England	1–1	British Home Championship	Graham Leggat	129,193	
276	4 May 1960	Hampden Park, Glasgow (H)	Poland	2–3	Friendly	Denis Law, Ian St. John	26,643	
277	29 May 1960	Praterstadion, Vienna (A)	Austria	1–4	Friendly	Dave Mackay	60,000	
278	5 June 1960	Nepstadion, Budapest (A)	Hungary	3–3	Friendly	William Hunter, George Herd, Alex Young	90,000	
279	8 June 1960	19.Mayis Stadion, Ankara (A)	Turkey	2–4	Friendly	Eric Caldow, Alex Young	22,507	
280	22 October 1960	Ninian Park, Cardiff (A)	Wales	0–2	British Home Championship		55,000	
281	9 November 1960	Hampden Park, Glasgow (H)	Northern Ireland	5–2	British Home Championship	Denis Law, Eric Caldow, Alex Young, Ralph Brand (2)	34,564	
282	15 April 1961	Wembley Stadium, London (A)	England	3–9	British Home Championship	Dave Mackay, Davie Wilson (2) (Note: The SFA credit the third Scotland goal to Davie Wilson, but RSSSF credit the goal to Pat Quinn.)	97,350	
283	3 May 1961	Hampden Park, Glasgow (H)	Republic of Ireland	4–1	World Cup qualification	Ralph Brand (2), David Herd (2)	46,696	
284	7 May 1961	Dalymount Park, Dublin (A)	Republic of Ireland	3–0	World Cup qualification	Alex Young (2), Ralph Brand	45,000	
285	14 May 1961	Tehelne Pole Stadion, Bratislava (A)	Czechoslovakia	0–4	World Cup qualification		50,000	
286	26 September 1961	Hampden Park, Glasgow (H)	Czechoslovakia	3–2	World Cup qualification	Ian St. John, Denis Law (2)	51,590	
287	7 October 1961	Windsor Park, Belfast (A)	Northern Ireland	6–1	British Home Championship	Davie Wilson, Alex Scott (3), Ralph Brand (2)	41,000	
288	8 November 1961	Hampden Park, Glasgow (H)	Wales	2–0	British Home Championship	Ian St. John (2)	74,329	
289	29 November 1961	Stade Heysel, Brussels (N)	Czechoslovakia	2–4	World Cup qualification (Note: The match was played as a tie-breaking play-off because Scotland and Czechoslovakia were level on 6 points. It finished 2–2 after 90 minutes and was decided by a period of extra time.)	Ian St. John (2)	7,000	
290	14 April 1962	Hampden Park, Glasgow (H)	England	2–0	British Home Championship	Davie Wilson, Eric Caldow	132,441	
291	2 May 1962	Hampden Park, Glasgow (H)	Uruguay	2–3	Friendly	Jim Baxter, Ralph Brand	67,181	
292	20 October 1962	Ninian Park, Cardiff (A)	Wales	3–2	British Home Championship	Eric Caldow, Denis Law, Willie Henderson	50,000	
293	7 November 1962	Hampden Park, Glasgow (H)	Northern Ireland	5–1	British Home Championship	Denis Law (4), Willie Henderson	58,734	
294	6 April 1963	Wembley Stadium, London (A)	England	2–1	British Home Championship	Jim Baxter (2)	98,606	
295	8 May 1963	Hampden Park, Glasgow (H)	Austria	4–1	Friendly (Note: The match was abandoned after 79 minutes by English referee Jim Finney after two Austrian players were sent off. Finney said afterwards: "I felt that I had to abandon the match or somebody would have been seriously hurt." The match was recognised by FIFA as an official international and caps were awarded by the SFA.)	Davie Wilson (2), Denis Law (2)	94,596	
296	4 June 1963	Brann Stadion, Bergen (A)	Norway	3–4	Friendly	Denis Law (3)	23,000	
297	9 June 1963	Dalymount Park, Dublin (A)	Republic of Ireland	0–1	Friendly		30,000	
298	13 June 1963	Estadio Santiago Bernabéu, Madrid (A)	Spain	6–2	Friendly	Denis Law, Dave Gibson, Frank McLintock, Davie Wilson, Willie Henderson, Ian St. John	40,000	
299	12 October 1963	Windsor Park, Belfast (A)	Northern Ireland	1–2	British Home Championship	Ian St. John	39,000	
300	7 November 1963	Hampden Park, Glasgow (H)	Norway	6–1	Friendly	Denis Law (4), Dave Mackay (2)	35,416	
301	20 November 1963	Hampden Park, Glasgow (H)	Wales	2–1	British Home Championship	John White, Denis Law	56,067	
302	11 April 1964	Hampden Park, Glasgow (H)	England	1–0	British Home Championship	Alan Gilzean	133,245	
303	12 May 1964	Niedersachsen Stadion, Hanover (A)	West Germany	2–2	Friendly	Alan Gilzean (2)	75,000	
304	3 October 1964	Ninian Park, Cardiff (A)	Wales	2–3	British Home Championship	Stevie Chalmers, Dave Gibson	37,093	
305	21 October 1964	Hampden Park, Glasgow (H)	Finland	3–1	World Cup qualification	Denis Law, Stevie Chalmers, Dave Gibson	54,442	
306	25 November 1964	Hampden Park, Glasgow (H)	Northern Ireland	3–2	British Home Championship	Davie Wilson (2), Alan Gilzean	48,752	
307	10 April 1965	Wembley Stadium, London (A)	England	2–2	British Home Championship	Denis Law, Ian St. John	98,199	
308	8 May 1965	Hampden Park, Glasgow (H)	Spain	0–0	Friendly		60,146	
309	23 May 1965	Stadion Slaski, Chorzów (A)	Poland	1–1	World Cup qualification	Denis Law	67,462	
310	27 May 1965	Olympic Stadium, Helsinki (A)	Finland	2–1	World Cup qualification	Davie Wilson, John Greig	20,162	
311	2 October 1965	Windsor Park, Belfast (A)	Northern Ireland	2–3	British Home Championship	Alan Gilzean (2)	50,000	
312	13 October 1965	Hampden Park, Glasgow (H)	Poland	1–2	World Cup qualification	Billy McNeill	107,580	
313	9 November 1965	Hampden Park, Glasgow (H)	Italy	1–0	World Cup qualification	John Greig	100,393	
314	24 November 1965	Hampden Park, Glasgow (H)	Wales	4–1	British Home Championship	Bobby Murdoch (2), Willie Henderson, John Greig	49,888	
315	7 December 1965	Stadio San Paolo, Naples (A)	Italy	0–3	World Cup qualification		68,873	
316	2 April 1966	Hampden Park, Glasgow (H)	England	3–4	British Home Championship	Denis Law, Jimmy Johnstone (2)	123,052	
317	11 May 1966	Hampden Park, Glasgow (H)	Netherlands	0–3	Friendly		16,513	
318	18 June 1966	Hampden Park, Glasgow (H)	Portugal	0–1	Friendly		23,332	
319	25 June 1966	Hampden Park, Glasgow (H)	Brazil	1–1	Friendly	Stevie Chalmers	74,933	
320	22 October 1966	Ninian Park, Cardiff (A)	Wales	1–1	British Home Championship (Note: The 1967 and 1968 British Home Championships were also used as a UEFA Euro 1968 qualifying group. Scotland finished in second place in group 8 and did not progress further in the competition.)	Denis Law	33,269	
321	16 November 1966	Hampden Park, Glasgow (H)	Northern Ireland	2–1	British Home Championship	Bobby Murdoch, Bobby Lennox	45,281	
322	15 April 1967	Wembley Stadium, London (A)	England	3–2	British Home Championship	Denis Law, Bobby Lennox, Jim McCalliog	99,063	
323	10 May 1967	Hampden Park, Glasgow (H)	Soviet Union	0–2	Friendly		53,497	
324	16 May 1967	National Stadium, Ramat Gan (A)	Israel	2–1	Friendly (Note: Five matches from the 1967 SFA tour were reclassified as full internationals in 2021.)	Willie Morgan, Alex Ferguson (Note: Some reports list Eddie Colquhoun as the second goalscorer, others as Harry Hood.)	27,000	
325	28 May 1967	Sydney Showground, Sydney (A)	Australia	1–0	Friendly	Alex Ferguson	34,792	
326	31 May 1967	Norwood Oval, Adelaide (A)	Australia	2–1	Friendly	Jim Townsend, Willie Morgan	12,500	
327	3 June 1967	Olympic Park Stadium, Melbourne (A)	Australia	2–0	Friendly	Alex Ferguson (2)	22,138	
328	13 June 1967	Alexander Park, Winnipeg (A)	Canada Olympic Team	7–2	Friendly	Joe Harper (5), (Note: Some reports assign only 3 goals to Joe Harper, crediting the others to Willie Morgan (his second) and a Canadian own goal.) Bobby Hope, Willie Morgan	3,000	
329	21 October 1967	Windsor Park, Belfast (A)	Northern Ireland	0–1	British Home Championship		55,000	
330	22 November 1967	Hampden Park, Glasgow (H)	Wales	3–2	British Home Championship	Alan Gilzean (2), Ronnie McKinnon	57,472	
331	24 February 1968	Hampden Park, Glasgow (H)	England	1–1	British Home Championship	John Hughes	134,000	
332	30 May 1968	Olympic Stadium, Amsterdam (A)	Netherlands	0–0	Friendly		19,000	
333	16 October 1968	Idraetsparken, Copenhagen (A)	Denmark	1–0	Friendly	Bobby Lennox	11,900	
334	6 November 1968	Hampden Park, Glasgow (H)	Austria	2–1	World Cup qualification	Denis Law, Billy Bremner	80,856	
335	11 December 1968	GSP Stadium, Nicosia (A)	Cyprus	5–0	World Cup qualification	Alan Gilzean (2), Bobby Murdoch, Colin Stein (2)	5,895	
336	16 April 1969	Hampden Park, Glasgow (H)	West Germany	1–1	World Cup qualification	Bobby Murdoch	96,292	
337	3 May 1969	Racecourse Ground, Wrexham (A)	Wales	5–3	British Home Championship	Billy McNeill, Colin Stein, Alan Gilzean, Billy Bremner, Tommy McLean	18,765	
338	6 May 1969	Hampden Park, Glasgow (H)	Northern Ireland	1–1	British Home Championship	Colin Stein	7,483	
339	10 May 1969	Wembley Stadium, London (A)	England	1–4	British Home Championship	Colin Stein	89,902	
340	17 May 1969	Hampden Park, Glasgow (H)	Cyprus	8–0	World Cup qualification	Eddie Gray, Billy McNeill, Colin Stein (4), Willie Henderson, Tommy Gemmell	39,095	
341	21 September 1969	Dalymount Park, Dublin (A)	Republic of Ireland	1–1	Friendly	Colin Stein	30,000	
342	22 October 1969	Volksparkstadion, Hamburg (A)	West Germany	2–3	World Cup qualification	Jimmy Johnstone, Alan Gilzean	70,448	
343	5 November 1969	Praterstadion, Vienna (A)	Austria	0–2	World Cup qualification		10,091	
344	18 April 1970	Windsor Park, Belfast (A)	Northern Ireland	1–0	British Home Championship	John O'Hare	31,000	
345	22 April 1970	Hampden Park, Glasgow (H)	Wales	0–0	British Home Championship		30,434	
346	25 April 1970	Hampden Park, Glasgow (H)	England	0–0	British Home Championship		137,438	
347	11 November 1970	Hampden Park, Glasgow (H)	Denmark	1–0	Euro 1972 qualifying	John O'Hare	24,618	
348	3 February 1971	Stade Sclessin, Liège (A)	Belgium	0–3	Euro 1972 qualifying		13,931	
349	21 April 1971	Estádio da Luz, Lisbon (A)	Portugal	0–2	Euro 1972 qualifying		35,463	
350	15 May 1971	Ninian Park, Cardiff (A)	Wales	0–0	British Home Championship		19,068	
351	18 May 1971	Hampden Park, Glasgow (H)	Northern Ireland	0–1	British Home Championship		31,643	
352	22 May 1971	Wembley Stadium, London (A)	England	1–3	British Home Championship	Hugh Curran	91,469	
353	9 June 1971	Idraetsparken, Copenhagen (A)	Denmark	0–1	Euro 1972 qualifying		37,682	
354	14 June 1971	Central Lenin Stadium, Moscow (A)	Soviet Union	0–1	Friendly		20,000	
355	13 October 1971	Hampden Park, Glasgow (H)	Portugal	2–1	Euro 1972 qualifying	John O'Hare, Archie Gemmill	58,612	
356	10 November 1971	Pittodrie Stadium, Aberdeen (H)	Belgium	1–0	Euro 1972 qualifying	John O'Hare	36,500	
357	1 December 1971	Olympic Stadium, Amsterdam (A)	Netherlands	1–2	Friendly	George Graham	20,000	
358	26 April 1972	Hampden Park, Glasgow (H)	Peru	2–0	Friendly	John O'Hare, Denis Law	21,001	
359	20 May 1972	Hampden Park, Glasgow (H)	Northern Ireland	2–0	British Home Championship	Denis Law, Peter Lorimer	39,710	
360	24 May 1972	Hampden Park, Glasgow (H)	Wales	1–0	British Home Championship	Peter Lorimer	21,332	
361	27 May 1972	Hampden Park, Glasgow (H)	England	0–1	British Home Championship		119,325	
362	29 June 1972	Mineirão, Belo Horizonte (N)	Yugoslavia	2–2	Brazil Independence Cup	Lou Macari (2)	4,000	
363	2 July 1972	Estadio Biera Rio, Porto Alegre (N)	Czechoslovakia	0–0	Brazil Independence Cup		5,000	
364	5 July 1972	Estadio do Maracana, Rio de Janeiro (A)	Brazil	0–1	Brazil Independence Cup		130,000	
365	18 October 1972	Idraetsparken, Copenhagen (A)	Denmark	4–1	World Cup qualification	Lou Macari, Jimmy Bone, Joe Harper, Willie Morgan	31,200	
366	15 November 1972	Hampden Park, Glasgow (H)	Denmark	2–0	World Cup qualification	Kenny Dalglish, Peter Lorimer	47,109	
367	14 February 1973	Hampden Park, Glasgow (H)	England	0–5	Friendly (Note: Three friendly matches were organised in 1973 to celebrate the centenary of the Scottish Football Association. These were against traditional rivals England, 1970 FIFA World Cup winners Brazil and UEFA Euro 1972 winners West Germany.)		48,470	
368	12 May 1973	Racecourse Ground, Wrexham (A)	Wales	2–0	British Home Championship	George Graham (2)	18,682	
369	16 May 1973	Hampden Park, Glasgow (H)	Northern Ireland	1–2	British Home Championship	Kenny Dalglish	39,018	
370	19 May 1973	Wembley Stadium, London (A)	England	0–1	British Home Championship		95,950	
371	22 June 1973	Wankdorf Stadion, Bern (A)	Switzerland	0–1	Friendly		10,000	
372	30 June 1973	Hampden Park, Glasgow (H)	Brazil	0–1	Friendly		78,181	
373	26 September 1973	Hampden Park, Glasgow (H)	Czechoslovakia	2–1	World Cup qualification	Jim Holton, Joe Jordan	95,786	
374	17 October 1973	Tehelne Pole Stadion, Bratislava (A)	Czechoslovakia	0–1	World Cup qualification		13,668	
375	14 November 1973	Hampden Park, Glasgow (H)	West Germany	1–1	Friendly	Jim Holton	58,235	
376	27 March 1974	Waldstadion, Frankfurt (A)	West Germany	1–2	Friendly	Kenny Dalglish	62,000	
377	11 May 1974	Hampden Park, Glasgow (H)	Northern Ireland	0–1	British Home Championship		53,775	
378	14 May 1974	Hampden Park, Glasgow (H)	Wales	2–0	British Home Championship	Kenny Dalglish, Sandy Jardine	41,969	
379	18 May 1974	Hampden Park, Glasgow (H)	England	2–0	British Home Championship	Joe Jordan, Own goal	94,487	
380	1 June 1974	Stade Klokke, Bruges (A)	Belgium	1–2	Friendly	Jimmy Johnstone	7,769	
381	6 June 1974	Ullevaal Stadion, Oslo (A)	Norway	2–1	Friendly	Joe Jordan, Kenny Dalglish	18,432	
382	14 June 1974	Westfalenstadion, Dortmund (N)	Zaire	2–0	World Cup	Peter Lorimer, Joe Jordan	25,800	
383	18 June 1974	Waldstadion, Frankfurt (N)	Brazil	0–0	World Cup		62,000	
384	22 June 1974	Waldstadion, Frankfurt (N)	Yugoslavia	1–1	World Cup	Joe Jordan	56,000	
385	30 October 1974	Hampden Park, Glasgow (H)	East Germany	3–0	Friendly	Tommy Hutchison, Kenny Burns, Kenny Dalglish	39,445	
386	20 November 1974	Hampden Park, Glasgow (H)	Spain	1–2	Euro 1976 qualifying	Billy Bremner	94,331	
387	5 February 1975	Estadio Luis Casanova, Valencia (A)	Spain	1–1	Euro 1976 qualifying	Joe Jordan	40,952	
388	16 April 1975	Ullevi Stadion, Gothenburg (A)	Sweden	1–1	Friendly	Ted MacDougall	15,574	
389	13 May 1975	Hampden Park, Glasgow (H)	Portugal	1–0	Friendly	Own goal	34,307	
390	17 May 1975	Ninian Park, Cardiff (A)	Wales	2–2	British Home Championship	Colin Jackson, Bruce Rioch	23,509	
391	20 May 1975	Hampden Park, Glasgow (H)	Northern Ireland	3–0	British Home Championship	Ted MacDougall, Kenny Dalglish, Derek Parlane	64,696	
392	24 May 1975	Wembley Stadium, London (A)	England	1–5	British Home Championship	Bruce Rioch	98,241	
393	1 June 1975	Stadionul 23 August, Bucharest (A)	Romania	1–1	Euro 1976 qualifying	Gordon McQueen	52,203	
394	3 September 1975	Idraetsparken, Copenhagen (A)	Denmark	1–0	Euro 1976 qualifying	Joe Harper	40,300	
395	29 October 1975	Hampden Park, Glasgow (H)	Denmark	3–1	Euro 1976 qualifying	Kenny Dalglish, Bruce Rioch, Ted MacDougall	48,021	
396	17 December 1975	Hampden Park, Glasgow (H)	Romania	1–1	Euro 1976 qualifying	Bruce Rioch	11,375	
397	7 April 1976	Hampden Park, Glasgow (H)	Switzerland	1–0	Friendly	Willie Pettigrew	15,531	
398	6 May 1976	Hampden Park, Glasgow (H)	Wales	3–1	British Home Championship	Willie Pettigrew, Bruce Rioch, Eddie Gray	25,466	
399	8 May 1976	Hampden Park, Glasgow (H)	Northern Ireland	3–0	British Home Championship	Archie Gemmill, Don Masson, Kenny Dalglish	49,897	
400	15 May 1976	Hampden Park, Glasgow (H)	England	2–1	British Home Championship	Don Masson, Kenny Dalglish	85,167	
401	8 September 1976	Hampden Park, Glasgow (H)	Finland	6–0	Friendly	Bruce Rioch, Don Masson, Kenny Dalglish, Andy Gray (2), Eddie Gray	16,338	
402	13 October 1976	Sparta Stadion, Prague (A)	Czechoslovakia	0–2	World Cup qualification		38,000	
403	17 November 1976	Hampden Park, Glasgow (H)	Wales	1–0	World Cup qualification	Own goal	63,233	
404	27 April 1977	Hampden Park, Glasgow (H)	Sweden	3–1	Friendly	Asa Hartford, Kenny Dalglish, Joe Craig	22,659	
405	28 May 1977	Racecourse Ground, Wrexham (A)	Wales	0–0	British Home Championship		14,469	
406	1 June 1977	Hampden Park, Glasgow (H)	Northern Ireland	3–0	British Home Championship	Kenny Dalglish (2), Gordon McQueen	44,699	
407	4 June 1977	Wembley Stadium, London (A)	England	2–1	British Home Championship	Gordon McQueen, Kenny Dalglish	98,103	
408	15 June 1977	Estadio Nacional de Chile, Santiago (A)	Chile	4–2	Friendly	Kenny Dalglish, Lou Macari (2), Asa Hartford	17,000	
409	18 June 1977	Estadio Boca Juniors, Buenos Aires (A)	Argentina	1–1	Friendly	Don Masson	57,000	
410	23 June 1977	Estadio do Maracana, Rio de Janeiro (A)	Brazil	0–2	Friendly		60,763	
411	7 September 1977	Stadion der Weltjugend, East Berlin (A)	East Germany	0–1	Friendly		50,000	
412	21 September 1977	Hampden Park, Glasgow (H)	Czechoslovakia	3–1	World Cup qualification	Joe Jordan, Asa Hartford, Kenny Dalglish	85,000	
413	12 October 1977	Anfield, Liverpool (N) (Note: Ninian Park, the normal home ground for Wales at the time, was not used because there had been disorder at a Wales match there in 1976. The Football Association of Wales decided to play the match at Anfield, rather than an alternative Welsh ground such as the Racecourse Ground in Wrexham, because it had a much greater capacity.)	Wales	2–0	World Cup qualification	Don Masson, Kenny Dalglish	50,850	
414	22 February 1978	Hampden Park, Glasgow (H)	Bulgaria	2–1	Friendly	Archie Gemmill, Ian Wallace	57,344	
415	13 May 1978	Hampden Park, Glasgow (H)	Northern Ireland	1–1	British Home Championship	Derek Johnstone	64,433	
416	17 May 1978	Hampden Park, Glasgow (H)	Wales	1–1	British Home Championship	Derek Johnstone	70,241	
417	20 May 1978	Hampden Park, Glasgow (H)	England	0–1	British Home Championship		88,319	
418	3 June 1978	Estadio Chateau Carreras, Córdoba (N)	Peru	1–3	World Cup	Joe Jordan	37,927	
419	7 June 1978	Estadio Chateau Carreras, Córdoba (N)	Iran	1–1	World Cup	Own goal	7,938	
420	11 June 1978	Estadio San Martin, Mendoza (N)	Netherlands	3–2	World Cup	Kenny Dalglish, Archie Gemmill (2)	35,130	
421	20 September 1978	Praterstadion, Vienna (A)	Austria	2–3	Euro 1980 qualifying	Gordon McQueen, Andy Gray	62,281	
422	25 October 1978	Hampden Park, Glasgow (H)	Norway	3–2	Euro 1980 qualifying	Kenny Dalglish (2), Archie Gemmill	65,372	
423	29 November 1978	Estádio da Luz, Lisbon (A)	Portugal	0–1	Euro 1980 qualifying		70,000	
424	19 May 1979	Ninian Park, Cardiff (A)	Wales	0–3	British Home Championship		20,371	
425	22 May 1979	Hampden Park, Glasgow (H)	Northern Ireland	1–0	British Home Championship	Arthur Graham	28,524	
426	26 May 1979	Wembley Stadium, London (A)	England	1–3	British Home Championship	John Wark	100,000	
427	2 June 1979	Hampden Park, Glasgow (H)	Argentina	1–3	Friendly	Arthur Graham	61,918	
428	7 June 1979	Ullevaal Stadion, Oslo (A)	Norway	4–0	Euro 1980 qualifying	Joe Jordan, Kenny Dalglish, John Robertson, Gordon McQueen	17,269	
429	12 September 1979	Hampden Park, Glasgow (H)	Peru	1–1	Friendly	Own goal	41,035	
430	17 October 1979	Hampden Park, Glasgow (H)	Austria	1–1	Euro 1980 qualifying	Archie Gemmill	67,895	
431	21 November 1979	Stade Heysel, Brussels (A)	Belgium	0–2	Euro 1980 qualifying		14,289	
432	19 December 1979	Hampden Park, Glasgow (H)	Belgium	1–3	Euro 1980 qualifying	John Robertson	25,389	

== Record by opponent ==
Team	Pld	W	D	L	GF	GA	GD	WPCT
Argentina	2	0	1	1	2	4	−2	0.00
Australia	3	3	0	0	5	1	+4	100.00
Austria	6	2	1	3	10	12	−2	33.33
Belgium	5	1	0	4	3	10	−7	20.00
Brazil	5	0	2	3	1	5	−4	0.00
Bulgaria	1	1	0	0	2	1	+1	100.00
Canada Olympic Team	1	1	0	0	7	2	+5	100.00
Chile	1	1	0	0	4	2	+2	100.00
Cyprus	2	2	0	0	13	0	+13	100.00
Czechoslovakia	8	3	1	4	10	15	−5	37.50
Denmark	7	6	0	1	12	3	+9	85.71
East Germany	2	1	0	1	3	1	+2	50.00
England	21	7	4	10	28	45	−17	33.33
Finland	3	3	0	0	11	2	+9	100.00
Hungary	1	0	1	0	3	3	0	0.00
Iran	1	0	1	0	1	1	0	0.00
Israel	1	1	0	0	2	1	+1	100.00
Italy	2	1	0	1	1	3	−2	50.00
Netherlands	4	1	1	2	4	7	−3	25.00
Northern Ireland	19	11	2	6	40	19	+21	57.89
Norway	5	4	0	1	18	8	+10	80.00
Peru	3	1	1	1	4	4	0	33.33
Poland	3	0	1	2	4	6	−2	0.00
Portugal	5	2	0	3	3	5	−2	40.00
Republic of Ireland	4	2	1	1	8	3	+5	50.00
Romania	2	0	2	0	2	2	0	0.00
Soviet Union	2	0	0	2	0	3	−3	0.00
Spain	4	1	2	1	8	5	+3	25.00
Sweden	2	1	1	0	4	2	+2	50.00
Switzerland	2	1	0	1	1	1	0	50.00
Turkey	1	0	0	1	2	4	−2	0.00
Uruguay	1	0	0	1	2	3	−1	0.00
Wales	21	12	6	3	36	22	+14	57.14
West Germany	5	0	3	2	7	9	−2	0.00
Yugoslavia	2	0	2	0	3	3	0	0.00
Zaire	1	1	0	0	2	0	+2	100.00
Total	158	70	33	55	266	217	+49	44.30

Source: Results

== British Home Championship record by season ==
Year	Placing
1959–60	1st (joint)
1960–61	3rd
1961–62	1st
1962–63	1st
1963–64	1st (joint)
1964–65	3rd
1965–66	3rd
1966–67	1st
1967–68	2nd
1968–69	2nd
1969–70	1st (joint)
1970–71	4th
1971–72	1st (joint)
1972–73	3rd
1973–74	1st (joint)
1974–75	2nd (joint)
1975–76	1st
1976–77	1st
1977–78	3rd
1978–79	3rd
