= Broomfield Park =

Stadium in North Lanarkshire, Scotland

- Broomfield
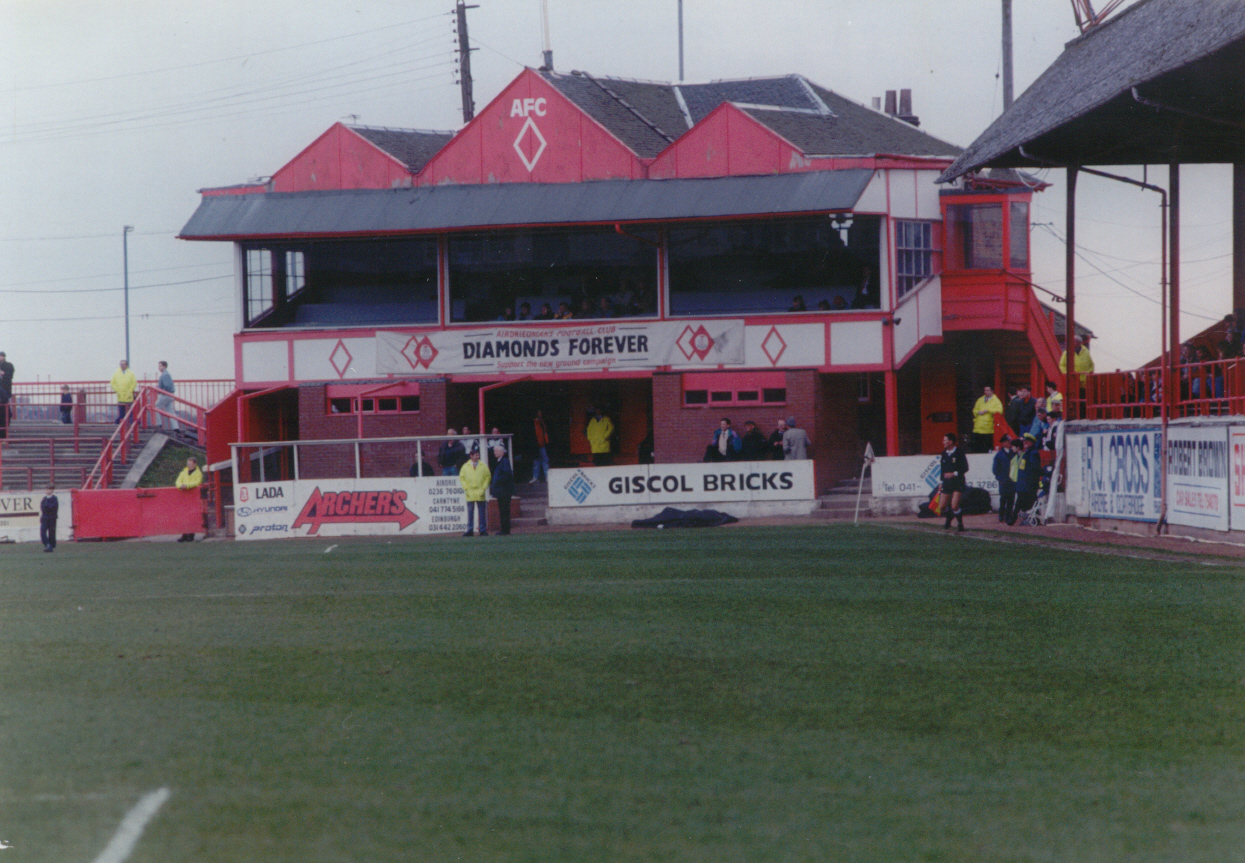
- The distinctive pavilion at Broomfield

- Location in North Lanarkshire
- Location: Gartlea Road; Airdrie; North Lanarkshire; Scotland
- Coordinates: 55°51′48.51″N 3°58′40.97″W
- Capacity: 12,620
- Surface: Grass; 112 yd × 67 yd (102 m × 61 m)

Construction
- Opened: 1892
- Closed: 1994
- Demolished: 1994

Tenant
- Airdrieonians (1892–1994)

Broomfield Park was a football stadium in Airdrie, North Lanarkshire, home of Airdrieonians from 1892 until it was closed after the 1993–94 football season.It was just 67 yards (61 metres) wide, and was built in a natural hollow. The record attendance at Broomfield Park was 24,000, in a Scottish Cup quarter-final match against Hearts on 8 March 1952.

== History ==
Airdrieonians F.C. was formed in 1878 and the club opened Broomfield in 1892. The Broomfield corner pavilion was built in 1907. After winning the 1923–24 Scottish Cup, the club built a main stand, adjacent to the pavilion. The record attendance at Broomfield Park was 24,000, in a Scottish Cup quarter-final match against Hearts on 8 March 1952. Floodlights were installed in 1956, and a roof was built over the Enclosure (opposite the main stand) in 1959. The ground was unusually narrow, at just 67 yards (61 metres) wide, and was built in a natural hollow. These physical features, and the proximity of the stands to the pitch, meant that Broomfield had a particularly raucous and oppressive atmosphere when crowded, which visiting clubs disliked but was advantageous to the home side.

Airdrieonians first explored the options for moving from Broomfield in 1989. A planning application was rejected by a public inquiry in 1993, but that same hearing allowed Broomfield to be redeveloped as a supermarket. Airdrieonians chose to sell Broomfield to supermarket chain Safeway (now a Morrison's supermarket after the latter taking over the former's UK stores) despite not having an alternative ground ready to move into. The last game at Broomfield was played on 7 May 1994 and the club then shared Broadwood Stadium, in Cumbernauld, with Clyde. Monklands District backed a plan for a 10,000-seat stadium at Raebog, but the proposal was rejected by Strathclyde Region in October 1995. A proposal for a site at Craigneuk was rejected by Monklands District in April 1996. After four years at Broadwood, Airdrieonians moved into the Shyberry Excelsior Stadium in 1998. Airdrieonians was liquidated in 2002 and replaced by Airdrie United. In June 2013, the Scottish Football Association permitted Airdrie United to formally change their name back to Airdrieonians.

== See also ==
- Stadium relocations in Scottish football
