= 1981–82 British Home Championship =

Tournament details
- Dates: 23 February – 29 May 1982
- Teams: 4

Final positions
- Champions: England (53rd title)
- Runners-up: Scotland

Tournament statistics
- Matches played: 6
- Goals scored: 12 (2 per match)
- Top scorer: 12 players (1 each)

The 1981–82 British Home Championship between the British Home Nations was won by a dominant England football team which won all three of its matches as the tournament returned after being abandoned in 1981 due to civil disturbances in Northern Ireland. The championship was eagerly awaited because for the first time since 1958, three of the Home Nations were featuring in a World Cup; the 1982 FIFA World Cup in Spain and this was a chance to see them in competitive action before the World Cup began. The end-of-season format that had been used throughout the 1970s was dropped as it was felt three games in eight days was too intense at the end of a season and prior to a World Cup. The English began with a heavy victory over Northern Ireland at home, followed by victory away in Wales. The Scots could only manage a draw with the disappointing Irish by contrast although they did beat Wales. The Welsh managed to salvage a result in their third game with a 3–0 defeat of Northern Ireland to claim third place. In the final deciding match in Glasgow, England edged victory through a Paul Mariner goal and thus claimed the championship. In the World Cup, Scotland were eliminated in the first round whilst England went out in the second round without losing a game. The unfancied Irish however provided a shock by beating hosts Spain and eliminating Yugoslavia in the first round before falling victim to the inspired French in round two.

== Table ==
Team	Pld	W	D	L	GF	GA	GD	Pts
England (C)	3	3	0	0	6	0	+6	6
Scotland	3	1	1	1	2	2	0	3
Wales	3	1	0	2	3	2	+1	2
Northern Ireland	3	0	1	2	1	8	−7	1

Rules for classification: 1) points 2) goal difference. The points system worked as follows: 2 points for a win and 1 point for a draw.
(C) Champions

== Results ==
23 February 1982

England	4–0	Northern Ireland
Robson 1'; Keegan 56'; Wilkins 85'; Hoddle 89'

Wembley Stadium, London
Referee: Gwyn Owen (Wales)

27 April 1982

Wales	0–1	England
		Francis 74'

Ninian Park, Cardiff
Referee: Thomas Donnelly (Northern Ireland)

28 April 1982

Northern Ireland	1–1	Scotland
McIlroy 52'		Wark 32'

Windsor Park, Belfast
Referee: John Hunting (England)

24 May 1982

Scotland	1–0	Wales
Hartford 7'

Hampden Park, Glasgow
Referee: Fred McKnight (Northern Ireland)

27 May 1982

Wales	3–0	Northern Ireland
Curtis 18'; Rush 64'; Nicholas 75'

Racecourse Ground, Wrexham
Referee: George Smith (Scotland)

29 May 1982

Scotland	0–1	England
		Mariner 13'

Hampden Park, Glasgow
Referee: Jan Redelfs (West Germany)
