= Douglas Park =

Stadium in South Lanarkshire, Scotland

- Location within South Lanarkshire
- Location: Hamilton, Scotland
- Coordinates: 55°46′49.72″N 4°03′17.75″W
- Surface: Grass

Construction
- Opened: 1888
- Closed: 1994
- Architect: Archibald Leitch (Main Stand)

Tenants
- Hamilton Academical (1888–1994); Clyde (1991–1994)

Douglas Park was a football stadium in Hamilton, South Lanarkshire, the home ground of Hamilton Academical from 1888 to 1994.

The stadium holds the record for Hamilton Academical's largest ever attendance, 28,690 people against Hearts in 1937. Douglas Park also played host to Clyde between 1991 and 1994, as that club awaited the building of their new ground in Cumbernauld, Broadwood Stadium.

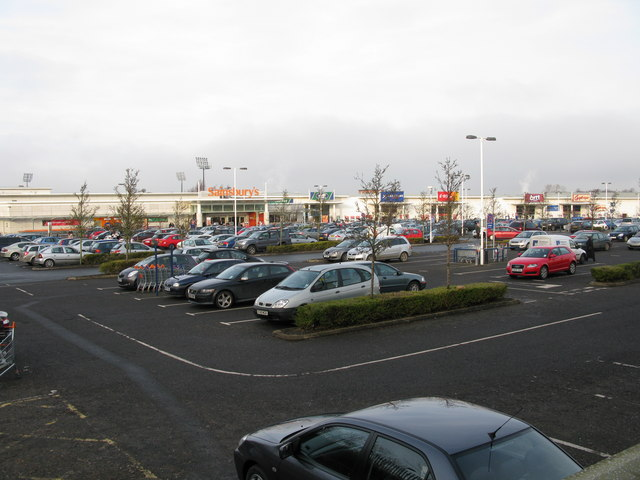
The location of the stadium is now a supermarket car park; the floodlights of its replacement can be seen over the roof.

Hamilton ceased playing first team matches at Douglas Park at the end of the 1993–94 season. The club continued to use the stadium for reserve team matches until January 1995, as the sale of the ground was not completed until December 1994. Douglas Park was then redeveloped as a Sainsbury's supermarket. Turnstiles were sold to Falkirk and part of the main stand was sold to Auchinleck Talbot for £30,000. The only part of the old ground that Hamilton Academical retained was the floodlights. A new stadium, called New Douglas Park, was built immediately next to the old site.

== See also ==
- Stadium relocations in Scottish football
