= 1983–84 British Home Championship =

Tournament details
- Dates: 13 December 1983 – 26 May 1984
- Teams: 4

Final positions
- Champions: Northern Ireland (8th title)
- Runners-up: Wales

Tournament statistics
- Matches played: 6
- Goals scored: 11 (1.83 per match)
- Top scorer: (Wales) Mark Hughes (England) Tony Woodcock (2 each)

The 1983–84 British Home Championship was the 100th anniversary of and the last staged of the British Home Championship international annual football tournament between the British Home Nations. Both England and Scotland had announced their withdrawal from future competition, citing waning interest in the games, crowded international fixture lists and a sharp rise in hooliganism. The football competition was instituted in 1884, but this edition was the 87th tournament to be staged due to a five-year hiatus during World War I, a seven-year gap in World War II and the cancellation of the 1981 competition following threats of violence during The Troubles in Northern Ireland.

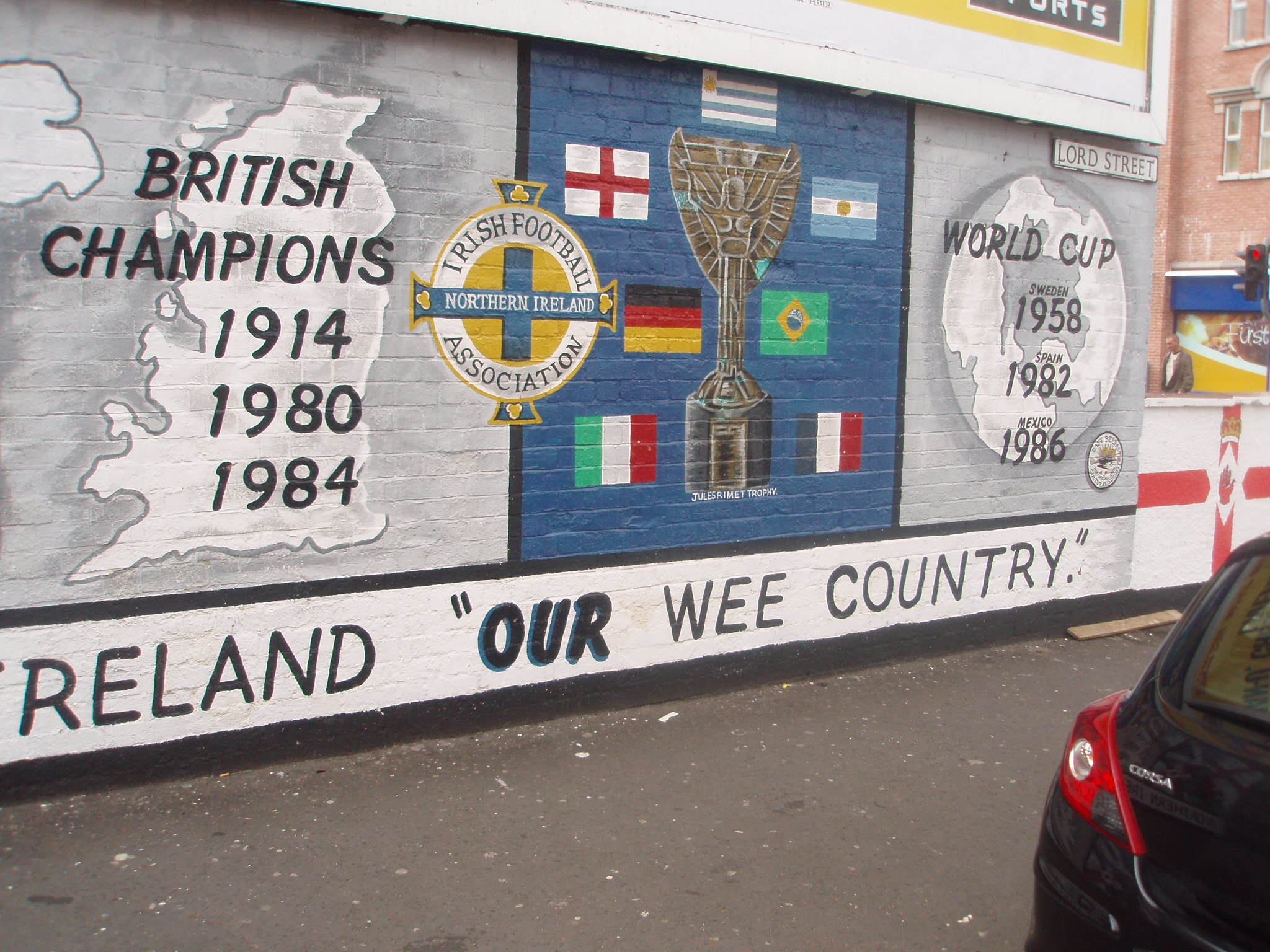
Mural in Belfast celebrating the three outright wins of the British Home Championship by Ireland and Northern Ireland, including in 1984.

The tournament was surprising in its outcome, as the favourites in England and Scotland played each other into a 1–1 draw in the final game, thus allowing Northern Ireland to claim victory on goal difference, with Wales second. This was only the third time in 87 tournaments that (Northern) Ireland were undisputed champions, and the only time goal difference was used to determine a champion. It also marked the first time since 1928 that neither Scotland nor England placed in the top two. The trophy was permanently awarded to the Irish FA.

== Table ==
Team	Pld	W	D	L	GF	GA	GD	Pts
Northern Ireland (C)	3	1	1	1	3	2	+1	3
Wales	3	1	1	1	3	3	0	3
England	3	1	1	1	2	2	0	3
Scotland	3	1	1	1	3	4	−1	3

Rules for classification: 1) points 2) goal difference. The points system worked as follows: 2 points for a win and 1 point for a draw.
(C) Champions

== Results ==
13 December 1983

Northern Ireland	2–0	Scotland
Whiteside 17'; McIlroy 56'	Report Page 22

Windsor Park, Belfast
Attendance: 10,000
Referee: Neil Midgley (England)

28 February 1984

Scotland	2–1	Wales
Cooper 37' (pen.); Johnston 78'	Report Page 26	James 47'

Hampden Park, Glasgow
Attendance: 21,542
Referee: Jack Poucher (Northern Ireland)

4 April 1984

England	1–0	Northern Ireland
Woodcock 49'	Report

Wembley Stadium, London
Attendance: 24,000
Referee: Ronald Bridges (Wales)

2 May 1984

Wales	1–0	England
Hughes 17'	Report

Racecourse Ground, Wrexham
Attendance: 14,250
Referee: David Syme (Scotland)

22 May 1984

Wales	1–1	Northern Ireland
Hughes 51'	Report	Armstrong 73'

Vetch Field, Swansea
Attendance: 7,845
Referee: Brian McGinlay (Scotland)

26 May 1984

Scotland	1–1	England
McGhee 12'	Report Page 15	Woodcock 35'

Hampden Park, Glasgow
Attendance: 73,064
Referee: Paolo Casarin (Italy)
