= Scotland national football team results (2000–2019) =

Joe Harvey

Scotland national football team results
- 1872–1914 (matches 1–113)
- 1920–39 (matches 114–188)
- 1940–59 (matches 189–274)
- 1960–79 (matches 275–432)
- 1980–99 (matches 433–611)
- 2000–19 (matches 612–783)
- 2020–present (matches 784–849)

- Unofficial matches

This article lists the results for the Scotland national football team between 2000 and 2019.

== Key ==
Key to matches

- Att. = Match attendance
- (H) = Home ground
- (A) = Away ground
- (N) = Neutral ground

Key to record by opponent

- Pld = Games played
- W = Games won
- D = Games drawn
- L = Games lost
- GF = Goals for
- GA = Goals against

== Results ==
Scotland's score is shown first in each case.

Match number	Date	Venue	Opponents	Score	Competition	Scotland scorers	Att.	Ref.
612	29 March 2000	Hampden Park, Glasgow (H)	France	0–2	Friendly		48,157	
613	26 April 2000	Gelredome, Arnhem (A)	Netherlands	0–0	Friendly		25,000	
614	30 May 2000	Lansdowne Road, Dublin (A)	Republic of Ireland	2–1	Friendly	Don Hutchison, Barry Ferguson	30,213	
615	2 September 2000	Stadionas Skonto, Riga (A)	Latvia	1–0	World Cup qualification	Neil McCann	9,200	
616	7 October 2000	Stadio Olimpico, Serravalle (A)	San Marino	2–0	World Cup qualification	Matt Elliott, Don Hutchison	4,377	
617	11 October 2000	Maksimir Stadion, Zagreb (A)	Croatia	1–1	World Cup qualification	Kevin Gallacher	17,995	
618	15 November 2000	Hampden Park, Glasgow (H)	Australia	0–2	Friendly		30,985	
619	24 March 2001	Hampden Park, Glasgow (H)	Belgium	2–2	World Cup qualification	Billy Dodds (2)	37,480	
620	28 March 2001	Hampden Park, Glasgow (H)	San Marino	4–0	World Cup qualification	Colin Hendry (2), Billy Dodds, Colin Cameron	27,313	
621	25 April 2001	Stadion WKS Zawisza, Bydgoszcz (A)	Poland	1–1	Friendly	Scott Booth	18,000	
622	1 September 2001	Hampden Park, Glasgow (H)	Croatia	0–0	World Cup qualification		47,384	
623	5 September 2001	Stade Roi Baudouin, Brussels (A)	Belgium	0–2	World Cup qualification		48,500	
624	6 October 2001	Hampden Park, Glasgow (H)	Latvia	2–1	World Cup qualification	Dougie Freedman, David Weir	23,228	
625	27 March 2002	Stade de France, Saint-Denis (A)	France	0–5	Friendly		76,961	
626	17 April 2002	Pittodrie Stadium, Aberdeen (H)	Nigeria	1–2	Friendly	Christian Dailly	20,465	
627	16 May 2002	Asiad Main Stadium, Busan (A)	South Korea	1–4	Friendly	Scott Dobie	52,384	
628	20 May 2002	Mong Kok Stadium, Hong Kong (N)	South Africa	0–2	HKSAR Reunification Cup		3,007	
629	23 May 2002	Hong Kong Stadium, Hong Kong (A)	Hong Kong League XI	4–0	HKSAR Reunification Cup (Note: Caps were awarded by the Scottish Football Association , but the match was not recognised by FIFA as an official international.)	Kevin Kyle, Steven Thompson, Christian Dailly, Scot Gemmill	8,000	
630	21 August 2002	Hampden Park, Glasgow (H)	Denmark	0–1	Friendly		28,766	
631	7 September 2002	Svangaskarð, Toftir (A)	Faroe Islands	2–2	Euro 2004 qualifying	Paul Lambert, Barry Ferguson	4,200	
632	12 October 2002	Laugardalsvollur, Reykjavík (A)	Iceland	2–0	Euro 2004 qualifying	Christian Dailly, Gary Naysmith	7,056	
633	15 October 2002	Easter Road, Edinburgh (H)	Canada	3–1	Friendly	Stevie Crawford (2), Steven Thompson	16,207	
634	20 November 2002	Estadio Primeiro de Maio, Braga (A)	Portugal	0–2	Friendly		8,000	
635	12 February 2003	Hampden Park, Glasgow (H)	Republic of Ireland	0–2	Friendly		33,337	
636	29 March 2003	Hampden Park, Glasgow (H)	Iceland	2–1	Euro 2004 qualifying	Kenny Miller, Lee Wilkie	37,938	
637	2 April 2003	Darius and Girėnas Stadium, Kaunas (A)	Lithuania	0–1	Euro 2004 qualifying		6,400	
638	30 April 2003	Hampden Park, Glasgow (H)	Austria	0–2	Friendly		12,189	
639	27 May 2003	Tynecastle Stadium, Edinburgh (H)	New Zealand	1–1	Friendly	Stevie Crawford	10,016	
640	7 June 2003	Hampden Park, Glasgow (H)	Germany	1–1	Euro 2004 qualifying	Kenny Miller	48,047	
641	20 August 2003	Ullevaal Stadion, Oslo (A)	Norway	0–0	Friendly		12,858	
642	6 September 2003	Hampden Park, Glasgow (H)	Faroe Islands	3–1	Euro 2004 qualifying	Neil McCann, Paul Dickov, James McFadden	40,901	
643	10 September 2003	Westfalenstadion, Dortmund (A)	Germany	1–2	Euro 2004 qualifying	Neil McCann	67,000	
644	11 October 2003	Hampden Park, Glasgow (H)	Lithuania	1–0	Euro 2004 qualifying	Darren Fletcher	50,343	
645	15 November 2003	Hampden Park, Glasgow (H)	Netherlands	1–0	Euro 2004 qualifying	James McFadden	50,670	
646	19 November 2003	Amsterdam ArenA, Amsterdam (A)	Netherlands	0–6	Euro 2004 qualifying		51,000	
647	18 February 2004	Millennium Stadium, Cardiff (A)	Wales	0–4	Friendly		47,124	
648	31 March 2004	Hampden Park, Glasgow (H)	Romania	1–2	Friendly	James McFadden	20,433	
649	28 April 2004	Parken Stadium, Copenhagen (A)	Denmark	0–1	Friendly		22,885	
650	27 May 2004	A. Le Coq Arena, Tallinn (A)	Estonia	1–0	Friendly	James McFadden	4,000	
651	30 May 2004	Easter Road, Edinburgh (H)	Trinidad and Tobago	4–1	Friendly	Darren Fletcher, Gary Holt, Gary Caldwell, Nigel Quashie	16,187	
652	18 August 2004	Hampden Park, Glasgow (H)	Hungary	0–3	Friendly		15,933	
653	3 September 2004	Estadio Ciutat de Valencia, Valencia (A)	Spain	1–1	Friendly (Note: The match was abandoned after 59 minutes due to floodlight failure and torrential rain, but it was recognised by FIFA as an official international and caps were awarded by the Scottish Football Association.)	James McFadden (Note: The Scottish Football Association credited the Scotland goal to James McFadden, but other sources reported that the goal was an own goal. (BBC Sport))	15,000	
654	8 September 2004	Hampden Park, Glasgow (H)	Slovenia	0–0	World Cup qualification		38,279	
655	9 October 2004	Hampden Park, Glasgow (H)	Norway	0–1	World Cup qualification		48,882	
656	13 October 2004	Stadionul Republican, Chișinău (A)	Moldova	1–1	World Cup qualification	Steven Thompson	7,000	
657	17 November 2004	Easter Road, Edinburgh (H)	Sweden	1–4	Friendly	James McFadden	15,071	
658	26 March 2005	San Siro, Milan (A)	Italy	0–2	World Cup qualification		40,745	
659	4 June 2005	Hampden Park, Glasgow (H)	Moldova	2–0	World Cup qualification	Christian Dailly, James McFadden	45,317	
660	8 June 2005	Dynama Stadium, Minsk (A)	Belarus	0–0	World Cup qualification		28,287	
661	17 August 2005	Arnold Schwarzenegger Stadion, Graz (A)	Austria	2–2	Friendly	Kenny Miller, Garry O’Connor	13,800	
662	3 September 2005	Hampden Park, Glasgow (H)	Italy	1–1	World Cup qualification	Kenny Miller	50,185	
663	7 September 2005	Ullevaal Stadion, Oslo (A)	Norway	2–1	World Cup qualification	Kenny Miller (2)	24,904	
664	8 October 2005	Hampden Park, Glasgow (H)	Belarus	0–1	World Cup qualification		51,105	
665	12 October 2005	Arena Petrol, Celje (A)	Slovenia	3–0	World Cup qualification	Darren Fletcher, James McFadden, Paul Hartley	9,100	
666	12 November 2005	Hampden Park, Glasgow (H)	United States	1–1	Friendly	Andy Webster	26,708	
667	1 March 2006	Hampden Park, Glasgow (H)	Switzerland	1–3	Friendly	Kenny Miller	20,952	
668	11 May 2006	Kobe Wing Stadium, Kobe (N)	Bulgaria	5–1	Kirin Cup	Kris Boyd (2), James McFadden, Chris Burke (2)	5,780	
669	13 May 2006	Saitama Stadium 2002, Saitama (A)	Japan	0–0	Kirin Cup		58,648	
670	2 September 2006	Celtic Park, Glasgow (H)	Faroe Islands	6–0	Euro 2008 qualifying	Darren Fletcher, James McFadden, Kris Boyd (2), Kenny Miller, Garry O'Connor	50,059	
671	6 September 2006	Darius and Girėnas Stadium, Kaunas (A)	Lithuania	2–1	Euro 2008 qualifying	Christian Dailly, Kenny Miller	7,500	
672	7 October 2006	Hampden Park, Glasgow (H)	France	1–0	Euro 2008 qualifying	Gary Caldwell	50,456	
673	11 October 2006	Olympic Stadium, Kyiv (A)	Ukraine	0–2	Euro 2008 qualifying		55,000	
674	24 March 2007	Hampden Park, Glasgow (H)	Georgia	2–1	Euro 2008 qualifying	Kris Boyd, Craig Beattie	50,850	
675	28 March 2007	Stadio San Nicola, Bari (A)	Italy	0–2	Euro 2008 qualifying		37,500	
676	30 May 2007	Gerhard Hanappi Stadium, Vienna (A)	Austria	1–0	Friendly	Garry O'Connor	13,200	
677	6 June 2007	Svangaskarð, Toftir (A)	Faroe Islands	2–0	Euro 2008 qualifying	Shaun Maloney, Garry O'Connor	4,600	
678	22 August 2007	Pittodrie Stadium, Aberdeen (H)	South Africa	1–0	Friendly	Kris Boyd	13,723	
679	8 September 2007	Hampden Park, Glasgow (H)	Lithuania	3–1	Euro 2008 qualifying	Kris Boyd, Stephen McManus, James McFadden	51,349	
680	12 September 2007	Parc des Princes, Paris (A)	France	1–0	Euro 2008 qualifying	James McFadden	43,342	
681	13 October 2007	Hampden Park, Glasgow (H)	Ukraine	3–1	Euro 2008 qualifying	Kenny Miller, Lee McCulloch, James McFadden	51,366	
682	17 October 2007	Boris Paichadze Stadium, Tbilisi (A)	Georgia	0–2	Euro 2008 qualifying		29,377	
683	17 November 2007	Hampden Park, Glasgow (H)	Italy	1–2	Euro 2008 qualifying	Barry Ferguson	51,301	
684	26 March 2008	Hampden Park, Glasgow (H)	Croatia	1–1	Friendly	Kenny Miller	28,821	
685	30 May 2008	AXA Arena, Prague (A)	Czech Republic	1–3	Friendly	David Clarkson	11,314	
686	20 August 2008	Hampden Park, Glasgow (H)	Northern Ireland	0–0	Friendly		28,072	
687	6 September 2008	Skopje City Stadium, Skopje (A)	Macedonia	0–1	World Cup qualification		9,000	
688	10 September 2008	Laugardalsvöllur, Reykjavík (A)	Iceland	2–1	World Cup qualification	Kirk Broadfoot, James McFadden	9,767	
689	11 October 2008	Hampden Park, Glasgow (H)	Norway	0–0	World Cup qualification		50,205	
690	19 November 2008	Hampden Park, Glasgow (H)	Argentina	0–1	Friendly		32,492	
691	28 March 2009	Amsterdam ArenA, Amsterdam (A)	Netherlands	0–3	World Cup qualification		49,552	
692	1 April 2009	Hampden Park, Glasgow (H)	Iceland	2–1	World Cup qualification	Ross McCormack, Steven Fletcher	42,259	
693	12 August 2009	Ullevaal Stadion, Oslo (A)	Norway	0–4	World Cup qualification		24,493	
694	5 September 2009	Hampden Park, Glasgow (H)	Macedonia	2–0	World Cup qualification	Scott Brown, James McFadden	50,214	
695	9 September 2009	Hampden Park, Glasgow (H)	Netherlands	0–1	World Cup qualification		51,230	
696	10 October 2009	Nissan Stadium, Yokohama (A)	Japan	0–2	Friendly		61,285	
697	14 November 2009	Cardiff City Stadium, Cardiff (A)	Wales	0–3	Friendly		13,844	
698	3 March 2010	Hampden Park, Glasgow (H)	Czech Republic	1–0	Friendly	Scott Brown	26,530	
699	11 August 2010	Rasunda Stadion, Solna (A)	Sweden	0–3	Friendly		25,249	
700	3 September 2010	Darius and Girėnas Stadium, Kaunas (A)	Lithuania	0–0	Euro 2012 qualifying		6,539	
701	7 September 2010	Hampden Park, Glasgow (H)	Liechtenstein	2–1	Euro 2012 qualifying	Kenny Miller, Stephen McManus	37,050	
702	8 October 2010	Synot Tip Arena, Prague (A)	Czech Republic	0–1	Euro 2012 qualifying		16,800	
703	12 October 2010	Hampden Park, Glasgow (H)	Spain	2–3	Euro 2012 qualifying	Steven Naismith, Own goal	51,322	
704	16 November 2010	Pittodrie Stadium, Aberdeen (H)	Faroe Islands	3–0	Friendly	Danny Wilson, Kris Commons, Jamie Mackie	10,873	
705	9 February 2011	Aviva Stadium, Dublin (N)	Northern Ireland	3–0	Nations Cup	Kenny Miller, James McArthur, Kris Commons	18,742	
706	27 March 2011	Emirates Stadium, London (N)	Brazil	0–2	Friendly		53,087	
707	25 May 2011	Aviva Stadium, Dublin (N)	Wales	3–1	Nations Cup	James Morrison, Kenny Miller, Christophe Berra	3,951	
708	29 May 2011	Aviva Stadium, Dublin (A)	Republic of Ireland	0–1	Nations Cup		17,694	
709	10 August 2011	Hampden Park, Glasgow (H)	Denmark	2–1	Friendly	Own goal, Robert Snodgrass	17,582	
710	3 September 2011	Hampden Park, Glasgow (H)	Czech Republic	2–2	Euro 2012 qualifying	Kenny Miller, Darren Fletcher	51,457	
711	6 September 2011	Hampden Park, Glasgow (H)	Lithuania	1–0	Euro 2012 qualifying	Steven Naismith	34,071	
712	8 October 2011	Rheinpark Stadion, Vaduz (A)	Liechtenstein	1–0	Euro 2012 qualifying	Craig Mackail-Smith	5,636	
713	11 October 2011	Estadio José Rico Pérez, Alicante (A)	Spain	1–3	Euro 2012 qualifying	David Goodwillie	24,896	
714	11 November 2011	Antonis Papadopoulos Stadium, Larnaca (A)	Cyprus	2–1	Friendly	Kenny Miller, Jamie Mackie	1,360	
715	29 February 2012	Bonifika Stadium, Koper (A)	Slovenia	1–1	Friendly	Christophe Berra	3,983	
716	26 May 2012	EverBank Field, Jacksonville (A)	United States	1–5	Friendly	Own goal	44,438	
717	15 August 2012	Easter Road, Edinburgh (H)	Australia	3–1	Friendly	Jordan Rhodes, Own goal, Ross McCormack	11,110	
718	8 September 2012	Hampden Park, Glasgow (H)	Serbia	0–0	World Cup qualification		47,369	
719	11 September 2012	Hampden Park, Glasgow (H)	Macedonia	1–1	World Cup qualification	Kenny Miller	32,430	
720	12 October 2012	Cardiff City Stadium, Cardiff (A)	Wales	1–2	World Cup qualification	James Morrison	23,249	
721	16 October 2012	Stade Roi Baudouin, Brussels (A)	Belgium	0–2	World Cup qualification		44,132	
722	14 November 2012	Stade Josy Barthel, Luxembourg (A)	Luxembourg	2–1	Friendly	Jordan Rhodes (2)	2,521	
723	6 February 2013	Pittodrie Stadium, Aberdeen (H)	Estonia	1–0	Friendly	Charlie Mulgrew	16,202	
724	22 March 2013	Hampden Park, Glasgow (H)	Wales	1–2	World Cup qualification	Grant Hanley	39,365	
725	26 March 2013	Karadorde Stadium, Novi Sad (A)	Serbia	0–2	World Cup qualification		6,500	
726	7 June 2013	Maksimir Stadion, Zagreb (A)	Croatia	1–0	World Cup qualification	Robert Snodgrass	25,016	
727	13 August 2013	Wembley Stadium, London (A)	England	2–3	Friendly	James Morrison, Kenny Miller	80,485	
728	6 September 2013	Hampden Park, Glasgow (H)	Belgium	0–2	World Cup qualification		40,284	
729	10 September 2013	Philip II Arena, Skopje (A)	Macedonia	2–1	World Cup qualification	Ikechi Anya, Shaun Maloney	14,093	
730	15 October 2013	Hampden Park, Glasgow (H)	Croatia	2–0	World Cup qualification	Robert Snodgrass, Steven Naismith	30,172	
731	15 November 2013	Hampden Park, Glasgow (H)	United States	0–0	Friendly		21,079	
732	19 November 2013	Aker Stadion, Molde (A)	Norway	1–0	Friendly	Scott Brown	9,751	
733	5 March 2014	National Stadium, Warsaw (A)	Poland	1–0	Friendly	Scott Brown	41,652	
734	28 May 2014	Craven Cottage, London (N)	Nigeria	2–2	Friendly	Charlie Mulgrew, Own goal	20,156	
735	7 September 2014	Westfalenstadion, Dortmund (A)	Germany	1–2	Euro 2016 qualifying	Ikechi Anya	60,209	
736	11 October 2014	Ibrox Stadium, Glasgow (H)	Georgia	1–0	Euro 2016 qualifying	Own goal	34,719	
737	14 October 2014	National Stadium, Warsaw (A)	Poland	2–2	Euro 2016 qualifying	Shaun Maloney, Steven Naismith	55,197	
738	14 November 2014	Celtic Park, Glasgow (H)	Republic of Ireland	1–0	Euro 2016 qualifying	Shaun Maloney	59,239	
739	18 November 2014	Celtic Park, Glasgow (H)	England	1–3	Friendly	Andrew Robertson	49,526	
740	25 March 2015	Hampden Park, Glasgow (H)	Northern Ireland	1–0	Friendly	Christophe Berra	20,117	
741	29 March 2015	Hampden Park, Glasgow (H)	Gibraltar	6–1	Euro 2016 qualifying	Steven Fletcher (3), Shaun Maloney (2), Steven Naismith	34,255	
742	5 June 2015	Easter Road, Edinburgh (H)	Qatar	1–0	Friendly	Matt Ritchie	14,270	
743	13 June 2015	Aviva Stadium, Dublin (A)	Republic of Ireland	1–1	Euro 2016 qualifying	Own goal	49,063	
744	4 September 2015	Boris Paichadze Dinamo Arena, Tbilisi (A)	Georgia	0–1	Euro 2016 qualifying		22,886	
745	7 September 2015	Hampden Park, Glasgow (H)	Germany	2–3	Euro 2016 qualifying	Own goal, James McArthur	50,753	
746	8 October 2015	Hampden Park, Glasgow (H)	Poland	2–2	Euro 2016 qualifying	Matt Ritchie, Steven Fletcher	49,359	
747	11 October 2015	Estádio Algarve, Faro (A)	Gibraltar	6–0	Euro 2016 qualifying	Steven Fletcher (3), Shaun Maloney, Steven Naismith, Chris Martin	12,401	
748	24 March 2016	Generali Arena, Prague (A)	Czech Republic	1–0	Friendly	Ikechi Anya	14,580	
749	29 March 2016	Hampden Park, Glasgow (H)	Denmark	1–0	Friendly	Matt Ritchie	18,385	
750	29 May 2016	Ta' Qali National Stadium, Ta' Qali (N)	Italy	0–1	Friendly		8,000	
751	4 June 2016	Stade Saint-Symphorien, Metz (A)	France	0–3	Friendly		25,057	
752	4 September 2016	Ta' Qali National Stadium, Ta' Qali (A)	Malta	5–1	World Cup qualification	Robert Snodgrass (3), Chris Martin, Steven Fletcher	15,069	
753	8 October 2016	Hampden Park, Glasgow (H)	Lithuania	1–1	World Cup qualification	James McArthur	35,966	
754	11 October 2016	Štadión Antona Malatinského, Trnava (A)	Slovakia	0–3	World Cup qualification		11,098	
755	11 November 2016	Wembley Stadium, London (A)	England	0–3	World Cup qualification		87,258	
756	22 March 2017	Easter Road, Edinburgh (H)	Canada	1–1	Friendly	Steven Naismith	9,158	
757	26 March 2017	Hampden Park, Glasgow (H)	Slovenia	1–0	World Cup qualification	Chris Martin	20,435	
758	10 June 2017	Hampden Park, Glasgow (H)	England	2–2	World Cup qualification	Leigh Griffiths (2)	48,520	
759	1 September 2017	LFF Stadium, Vilnius (A)	Lithuania	3–0	World Cup qualification	Stuart Armstrong, Andrew Robertson, James McArthur	5,067	
760	4 September 2017	Hampden Park, Glasgow (H)	Malta	2–0	World Cup qualification	Christophe Berra, Leigh Griffiths	26,371	
761	5 October 2017	Hampden Park, Glasgow (H)	Slovakia	1–0	World Cup qualification	Own goal	46,733	
762	8 October 2017	Stožice Stadium, Ljubljana (A)	Slovenia	2–2	World Cup qualification	Leigh Griffiths, Robert Snodgrass	11,123	
763	9 November 2017	Pittodrie Stadium, Aberdeen (H)	Netherlands	0–1	Friendly		17,883	
764	23 March 2018	Hampden Park, Glasgow (H)	Costa Rica	0–1	Friendly		20,488	
765	27 March 2018	Groupama Arena, Budapest (A)	Hungary	1–0	Friendly	Matt Phillips	8,942	
766	29 May 2018	Estadio Nacional, Lima (A)	Peru	0–2	Friendly		40,000	
767	2 June 2018	Estadio Azteca, Mexico City (A)	Mexico	0–1	Friendly		70,993	
768	7 September 2018	Hampden Park, Glasgow (H)	Belgium	0–4	Friendly		20,196	
769	10 September 2018	Hampden Park, Glasgow (H)	Albania	2–0	UEFA Nations League C	Own goal, Steven Naismith	17,455	
770	11 October 2018	Sammy Ofer Stadium, Haifa (A)	Israel	1–2	UEFA Nations League C	Charlie Mulgrew	10,234	
771	14 October 2018	Hampden Park, Glasgow (H)	Portugal	1–3	Friendly	Steven Naismith	19,684	
772	17 November 2018	Loro Boriçi Stadium, Shkodër (A)	Albania	4–0	UEFA Nations League C	Ryan Fraser, Steven Fletcher, James Forrest (2)	8,632	
773	20 November 2018	Hampden Park, Glasgow (H)	Israel	3–2	UEFA Nations League C	James Forrest (3)	21,281	
774	21 March 2019	Astana Arena, Astana (A)	Kazakhstan	0–3	Euro 2020 qualifying		27,641	
775	24 March 2019	Stadio Olimpico, Serravalle (A)	San Marino	2–0	Euro 2020 qualifying	Kenny McLean, Johnny Russell	4,077	
776	8 June 2019	Hampden Park, Glasgow (H)	Cyprus	2–1	Euro 2020 qualifying	Andrew Robertson, Oliver Burke	31,277	
777	11 June 2019	King Baudouin Stadium, Brussels (A)	Belgium	0–3	Euro 2020 qualifying		50,093	
778	6 September 2019	Hampden Park, Glasgow (H)	Russia	1–2	Euro 2020 qualifying	John McGinn	32,432	
779	9 September 2019	Hampden Park, Glasgow (H)	Belgium	0–4	Euro 2020 qualifying		25,524	
780	10 October 2019	Luzhniki Stadium, Moscow (A)	Russia	0–4	Euro 2020 qualifying		55,703	
781	13 October 2019	Hampden Park, Glasgow (H)	San Marino	6–0	Euro 2020 qualifying	John McGinn (3), Lawrence Shankland, Stuart Findlay, Stuart Armstrong	20,699	
782	16 November 2019	GSP Stadium, Nicosia (A)	Cyprus	2–1	Euro 2020 qualifying	John McGinn, Ryan Christie	7,595	
783	19 November 2019	Hampden Park, Glasgow (H)	Kazakhstan	3–1	Euro 2020 qualifying	John McGinn (2), Steven Naismith	19,515	

== Record by opponent ==
Team	Pld	W	D	L	GF	GA	GD	WPCT
Albania	2	2	0	0	6	0	+6	100.00
Argentina	1	0	0	1	0	1	−1	0.00
Australia	2	1	0	1	3	3	0	50.00
Austria	3	1	1	1	3	4	−1	33.33
Belarus	2	0	1	1	0	1	−1	0.00
Belgium	7	0	1	6	2	19	−17	0.00
Brazil	1	0	0	1	0	2	−2	0.00
Bulgaria	1	1	0	0	5	1	+4	100.00
Canada	2	1	1	0	4	2	+2	50.00
Costa Rica	1	0	0	1	0	1	−1	0.00
Croatia	5	2	3	0	5	2	+3	40.00
Cyprus	3	3	0	0	6	3	+3	100.00
Czech Republic	5	2	1	2	5	6	−1	40.00
Denmark	4	2	0	2	3	3	0	50.00
England	4	0	1	3	5	11	−6	0.00
Estonia	2	2	0	0	2	0	+2	100.00
Faroe Islands	5	4	1	0	16	3	+13	80.00
France	5	2	0	3	2	10	−8	40.00
Georgia	4	2	0	2	3	4	−1	50.00
Germany	4	0	1	3	5	8	−3	0.00
Gibraltar	2	2	0	0	12	1	+11	100.00
Hong Kong League XI	1	1	0	0	4	0	+4	100.00
Hungary	2	1	0	1	1	3	−2	50.00
Iceland	4	4	0	0	8	3	+5	100.00
Israel	2	1	0	1	4	4	0	50.00
Italy	5	0	1	4	2	8	−6	0.00
Japan	2	0	1	1	0	2	−2	0.00
Kazakhstan	2	1	0	1	3	4	−1	50.00
Latvia	2	2	0	0	3	1	+2	100.00
Liechtenstein	2	2	0	0	3	1	+2	100.00
Lithuania	8	5	2	1	11	4	+7	62.50
Luxembourg	1	1	0	0	2	1	+1	100.00
Macedonia	4	2	1	1	5	3	+2	50.00
Malta	2	2	0	0	7	1	+6	100.00
Mexico	1	0	0	1	0	1	−1	0.00
Moldova	2	1	1	0	3	1	+2	50.00
Netherlands	6	1	1	4	1	11	−10	16.67
New Zealand	1	0	1	0	1	1	0	0.00
Nigeria	2	0	1	1	3	4	−1	0.00
Northern Ireland	3	2	1	0	4	0	+4	66.67
Norway	6	2	2	2	3	6	−3	33.33
Peru	1	0	0	1	0	2	−2	0.00
Poland	4	1	3	0	6	5	+1	25.00
Portugal	2	0	0	2	1	5	−4	0.00
Qatar	1	1	0	0	1	0	+1	100.00
Republic of Ireland	5	2	1	2	4	5	−1	40.00
Romania	1	0	0	1	1	2	−1	0.00
Russia	2	0	0	2	1	6	−5	0.00
San Marino	4	4	0	0	14	0	+14	100.00
Serbia	2	0	1	1	0	2	−2	0.00
Slovakia	2	1	0	1	1	3	−2	50.00
Slovenia	5	2	3	0	7	3	+4	40.00
South Africa	2	1	0	1	1	2	−1	50.00
South Korea	1	0	0	1	1	4	−3	0.00
Spain	3	0	1	2	4	7	−3	0.00
Sweden	2	0	0	2	1	7	−6	0.00
Switzerland	1	0	0	1	1	3	−2	0.00
Trinidad and Tobago	1	1	0	0	4	1	+3	100.00
Ukraine	2	1	0	1	3	3	0	50.00
United States	3	0	2	1	2	6	−4	0.00
Wales	5	1	0	4	5	12	−7	20.00
Total	172	70	34	68	213	222	−9	40.70

Source: Results

Statistics include official FIFA recognised matches, and also includes a match against a Hong Kong League XI played on 23 May 2002 that the Scottish Football Association includes in its statistical totals.
