= John Robertson (footballer, born 1953) =

Scottish footballer (1953–2025)

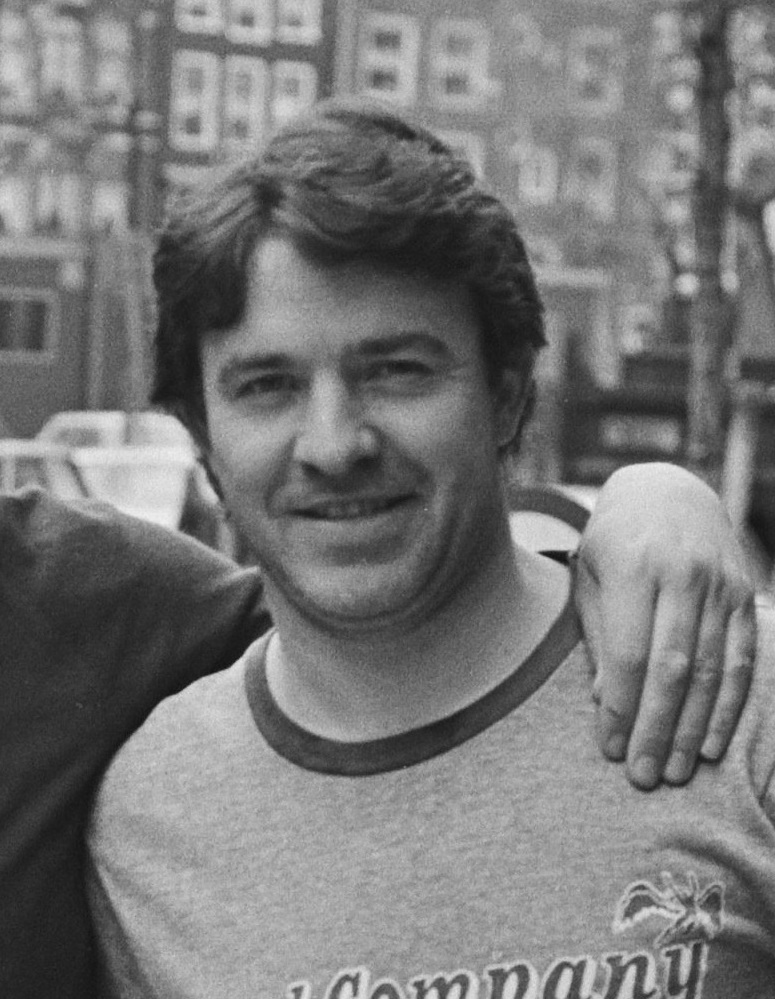
- Robertson in 1980

Personal information
- Full name: John Neilson Robertson
- Date of birth: 20 January 1953
- Place of birth: Viewpark, Lanarkshire, Scotland
- Date of death: 25 December 2025 (aged 72)
- Position: Left winger

Senior career*
Years	Team	Apps	(Gls)
1970–1983	Nottingham Forest	386	(61)
1983–1985	Derby County	72	(3)
1985–1986	Nottingham Forest	11	(0)
Total		469	(64)

International career
1978–1983	Scotland	28	(8)
- * Club domestic league appearances and goals

John Neilson Robertson (20 January 1953 – 25 December 2025) was a Scottish professional footballer who played as a left winger for Nottingham Forest, Derby County and the Scotland national team. He provided the assisting cross for Trevor Francis to score the only goal when Nottingham Forest won the 1979 European Cup final. A year later he scored in the final when Forest retained the European Cup, this time against Hamburger SV. At Forest he also won promotion from the 1976–77 Football League Second Division, the 1977–78 Football League First Division, the UEFA Super Cup, two Football League Cups, the 1978 FA Charity Shield and the Anglo-Scottish Cup.

Robertson also played for Scotland, scoring the winning goal against England in 1981 and against New Zealand in the 1982 FIFA World Cup.

He then moved into coaching, acting as an assistant to his former Nottingham Forest teammate Martin O'Neill at Wycombe Wanderers, Norwich City, Leicester City, Celtic, Aston Villa and Grantham Town.

== Playing career ==
=== Nottingham Forest (first spell) ===
Robertson represented Scotland at Schoolboy and Youth levels and played for Drumchapel Amateurs before joining Nottingham Forest in May 1970, making his first‑team debut later that year. Used mainly as a midfielder in his early seasons, he featured only sporadically and was on the transfer list when Brian Clough arrived in 1975. Under Clough, however, he was converted into a left winger and became a central figure in the side, putting together a run of 243 consecutive appearances between December 1976 and December 1980. He scored the decisive penalty in the replayed 1978 Football League Cup Final against Liverpool, set up Trevor Francis's winning goal in the 1979 European Cup Final, and struck the only goal of the 1980 European Cup Final against Hamburg.

Brian Clough, Robertson's manager at Nottingham Forest, was quoted as saying "John Robertson was a very unattractive young man. If one day, I felt a bit off colour, I would sit next to him. I was bloody Errol Flynn in comparison. But give him a ball and a yard of grass, and he was an artist, the Picasso of our game." In his autobiography Clough noted that "Rarely could there have been a more unlikely looking professional athlete... [He was a] scruffy, unfit, uninterested waste of time...but something told me he was worth persevering with." but that "[He] became one of the finest deliverers of a football I have ever seen – in Britain or anywhere else in the world – as fine as the Brazilians or the supremely gifted Italians." Robertson's captain at Forest, John McGovern, later said that "John Robertson was like Ryan Giggs but with two good feet, not one. He had more ability than Ryan Giggs, his ratio of creating goals was better and overall he was the superior footballer", whilst Forest coach Jimmy Gordon rated Robertson as a better player than Tom Finney and Stanley Matthews, saying that he "had something extra on top".

=== Later playing career ===
Robertson was sold to Derby County in June 1983 on a contested transfer, with the fee set by a tribunal; the move contributed to the breakdown in the relationship between Brian Clough and his former assistant Peter Taylor. Injuries soon after his arrival limited his impact at Derby, and he was unable to reproduce the form he had shown at Nottingham Forest. He rejoined Forest in August 1985 but remained below his previous level and later left to join non‑league Corby Town. He subsequently had spells with Stamford and Grantham Town.

=== International career ===
Robertson earned 28 international caps for Scotland between 1978 and 1983, scoring eight goals. He made his full international debut on 13 May 1978, in a 1–1 draw with Northern Ireland. He was then picked for their 1978 World Cup squad, playing in the 1–1 draw with Iran.

He scored three goals during qualification for the 1982 World Cup, twice in a 3–1 win against Israel in April 1981 and once in a 2–0 win against Sweden in September 1981. During that year Robertson also scored the winning goal in a British Championship match against England, which he later described as being his "greatest ever goal". Having helped Scotland qualify for the 1982 World Cup, Robertson played in all three of their matches at the tournament and scored in the 5–2 win against New Zealand.

== Coaching career ==
After retiring from playing, Robertson was variously chief scout and assistant manager to former Nottingham Forest teammate Martin O'Neill at Wycombe Wanderers, Shepshed Charterhouse, Norwich City, Leicester City, Celtic and Aston Villa.

== Personal life and death ==
Robertson's daughter Jessica was born in 1983 with cerebral palsy, which left her quadriplegic and unable to speak or control her movements. She had a short life expectancy. In 1994, Robertson and his former wife Sally challenged the hospital where Jessica was born for damages, claiming that they had caused her brain damage by a 12-hour delay to carry out a Caesarean section. However, they lost their High Court case in June 1996. Jessica died later that year, aged 13. Robertson had three other children, a daughter Elisabeth from his first marriage, and sons Andrew and Mark from his marriage to his second wife Paulette.

He released his autobiography, Supertramp, in September 2012. He supported Rangers as a boy but described his time at Celtic as assistant to Martin O'Neill as the best years of his life in football.

Robertson suffered a suspected heart attack while playing tennis with former Forest teammate Liam O'Kane on 23 August 2013.

Robertson died on 25 December 2025, at the age of 72, following a long illness.

=== Legacy ===
Robertson was voted into first place in a 2015 poll by the Nottingham Post of favourite all-time Nottingham Forest players.

== Career statistics ==
=== Club ===
Appearances and goals by club, season and competition
Club	Season	League			FA Cup		League Cup		Europe		Other (Note: Includes FA Charity Shield, Anglo-Scottish Cup, Football League Trophy, European Super Cup and Intercontinental Cup.)		Total	
Club	Season	Division	Apps	Goals	Apps	Goals	Apps	Goals	Apps	Goals	Apps	Goals	Apps	Goals
Nottingham Forest	1970–71	First Division	2	0	0	0	0	0	—		—		2	0
Nottingham Forest	1971–72	First Division	13	0	0	0	0	0	—		—		13	0
Nottingham Forest	1972–73	Second Division	32	4	3	0	0	0	—		—		35	4
Nottingham Forest	1973–74	Second Division	5	0	2	0	0	0	—		—		5	0
Nottingham Forest	1974–75	Second Division	20	0	4	1	1	0	—		—		25	1
Nottingham Forest	1975–76	Second Division	39	5	2	0	4	0	—		—		45	5
Nottingham Forest	1976–77	Second Division	41	6	5	3	2	0	—		9	2	57	11
Nottingham Forest	1977–78	First Division	42	12	6	3	8	3	—		—		56	18
Nottingham Forest	1978–79	First Division	42	9	3	0	8	4	9	2	1	1	63	16
Nottingham Forest	1979–80	First Division	42	11	2	1	10	4	9	3	2	0	65	19
Nottingham Forest	1980–81	First Division	38	6	6	2	4	1	2	0	2	0	52	9
Nottingham Forest	1981–82	First Division	36	2	1	0	5	1	—		—		42	3
Nottingham Forest	1982–83	First Division	34	6	1	0	5	3	—		—		40	9
Nottingham Forest	Total		386	61	35	10	47	16	20	5	14	3	502	95
Derby County	1983–84	Second Division	31	2	4	0	2	0	—		—		37	2
Derby County	1984–85	Third Division	41	1	1	0	4	1	—		2	0	48	2
Derby County	Total		72	3	5	0	6	1	—		2	0	85	4
Nottingham Forest	1985–86	First Division	11	0	1	0	0	0	—		—		12	0
Career total			469	64	41	10	53	17	20	5	16	3	599	99

=== International ===
Appearances and goals by national team and year
National team	Year	Apps	Goals
Scotland	1978	4	0
Scotland	1979	5	2
Scotland	1980	3	0
Scotland	1981	7	4
Scotland	1982	7	1
Scotland	1983	2	1
Total		28	8

Scores and results list Scotland's goal tally first, score column indicates score after each Robertson goal.

List of international goals scored by John Robertson
No.	Date	Venue	Opponent	Score	Result	Competition
1	7 June 1979	Ullevaal Stadion, Oslo, Norway	Norway	3–0	4–0	UEFA Euro 1980 qualifying
2	19 December 1979	Hampden Park, Glasgow, Scotland	Belgium	1–3	1–3	UEFA Euro 1980 qualifying
3	28 April 1981	Hampden Park, Glasgow, Scotland	Israel	1–0	3–1	1982 FIFA World Cup qualification
4	28 April 1981	Hampden Park, Glasgow, Scotland	Israel	2–0	3–1	1982 FIFA World Cup qualification
5	23 May 1981	Wembley Stadium, London, England	England	1–0	1–0	1981 British Home Championship
6	9 September 1981	Hampden Park, Glasgow, Scotland	Sweden	2–0	2–0	1982 FIFA World Cup qualification
7	15 June 1982	Estadio La Rosaleda, Málaga, Spain	New Zealand	4–2	5–2	1982 FIFA World Cup
8	21 September 1983	Hampden Park, Glasgow	Uruguay	1–0	2–0	Friendly

== Honours ==
Nottingham Forest

- Football League First Division: 1977–78
- Football League Cup: 1977–78, 1978–79; runner-up: 1979–80
- FA Charity Shield: 1978
- European Cup: 1978–79, 1979–80
- European Super Cup: 1979
- Anglo-Scottish Cup: 1976–77

Individual

- PFA Team of the Year: 1976–77 Second Division, 1977–78 First Division
