= 1980–81 British Home Championship =

Tournament details
- Dates: 16–23 May 1981
- Teams: 4

Final positions
- Champions: Unfinished

Tournament statistics
- Matches played: 4
- Goals scored: 5 (1.25 per match)
- Top scorer: (Wales) Ian Walsh (2)

The 1980–81 British Home Championship was the only British Home Nations international football championship, other than the years of the First World War and Second World War, which was not completed and thus failed to produce a winner. As with the rugby union 1972 Five Nations Championship the cause of this cancellation was The Troubles in Northern Ireland. The championship was scheduled to be played in May 1981 after the end of the domestic season. On 5 May, however, the Provisional Irish Republican Army hunger strike leader Bobby Sands died in the Maze Prison, invoking a storm of protest and violence by republicans in Northern Ireland. Thus the English and Welsh FAs, whose teams were scheduled to travel to Windsor Park later in the month, declined to play, rendering the tournament incomplete and void.

Scotland were the only team to complete all their matches, including defeating Northern Ireland in Glasgow, and were in a strong position, having also beaten England. Wales had beaten Scotland and played a tame draw with England and so too would have claimed victory with a win or draw in Belfast. England had lost one and drawn one and were not in a challenging position, whilst Northern Ireland lost their only game. Five months later, in October 1981, Scotland were able to play a qualifying match for the 1982 FIFA World Cup in Northern Ireland without significant difficulties.

== Table ==
Team	Pld	W	D	L	GF	GA	GD	Pts
Scotland	3	2	0	1	3	2	+1	4
Wales	2	1	1	0	2	0	+2	3
England	2	0	1	1	0	1	−1	1
Northern Ireland	1	0	0	1	0	2	−2	0

Rules for classification: 1) points 2) goal difference. The points system worked as follows: 2 points for a win and 1 point for a draw.

== Results ==
16 May 1981

Wales	2–0	Scotland
Walsh 17', 20'	Report (page 14)

Vetch Field, Swansea
Referee: Thomas Donnelly (Northern Ireland)

19 May 1981

Scotland	2–0	Northern Ireland
Stewart 5'; Archibald 49'	Report (page 22)

Hampden Park, Glasgow
Referee: Pat Partridge (England)

20 May 1981

England	0–0	Wales
	Report (page 18)

Wembley Stadium, London
Referee: Brian McGinlay (Scotland)

23 May 1981

England	0–1	Scotland
	Report	Robertson 64' (pen.)

Wembley Stadium, London
Referee: Robert Wurtz (France)
