= 1975–76 Nottingham Forest F.C. season =

English football club season

Nottingham Forest F.C.
1975–76 season
- Chairman: BJ Appleby, QC
- Manager: Brian Clough
- Second Division: 8th
- FA Cup: 3rd round
- League Cup: 3rd round
- Top goalscorer: League: Bowyer (11); All: Bowyer (14)
- Highest home attendance: 19,757 (League)
- Lowest home attendance: 11,343 (League)
- Average home league attendance: 14,047 (League)
Home colours	Away colours

The 1975–76 season was Nottingham Forest's 111th year in existence and fourth campaign consecutive in the Second Division since their relegation in 1972.

== Summary ==
During summer the Board appointed BJ Appleby as its new club chairman. The team was reinforced with several players, Goalkeeper Peter Wells from the youth team. For the defensive line, Frank Clark arrived free from Newcastle United after 14 seasons. For the midfield, Terry Curran was transferred in from Doncaster Rovers included the transfers out of Peacock and Ian Miller. In spite of the arrivals, the squad started poorly in League, and was early eliminated in League Cup. For winter, defender Colin Barrett was transferred in from Manchester City playing only a few matches in the season because an injury. The club was early eliminated in FA Cup being defeated by Peterborough United. For the second half of the season, Clough reinforced the defensive line with McGovern acting as a central-back defender, combined with a boosted performance of Bowyer and Curran allowed the squad to finish on a decent 8th spot in League.

== Squad ==
Note: Flags indicate national team as defined under FIFA eligibility rules; some limited exceptions apply. Players may hold more than one non-FIFA nationality.

Pos.	Nation	Player
GK	ENG	Peter Wells
GK	ENG	John Middleton
DF	ENG	Viv Anderson
DF	ENG	Frank Clark
DF	SCO	John McGovern
DF	ENG	Sammy Chapman (Captain)
DF	ENG	John Cottam
DF	NIR	Liam O'Kane
DF	ENG	David Sunley
DF	ENG	Colin Barrett
DF	ENG	Bryn Gunn
DF	ENG	Paddy Greenwood

Pos.	Nation	Player
MF	ENG	Terry Curran
MF	ENG	Ian Bowyer
MF	NIR	Martin O'Neill
MF	SCO	John Robertson
MF	SCO	George Lyall
MF	SCO	Jim McIntosh
MF	ENG	Paul Richardson
FW	SCO	John O'Hare
FW	ENG	Barry Butlin
FW	ENG	Jimmy McCann
FW	ENG	Bert Bowery

=== Transfers ===
In
Pos.	Name	from	Type
GK	Peter Wells		Free
MF	David Sunley	Sheffield Wednesday	loan
DF	Glynn Saunders		
DF	Frank Clark	Newcastle United	Free
MF	Terry Curran	Doncaster Rovers	£42,000

Out
Pos.	Name	To	Type
FW	Tony Woodcock	Lincoln City F.C.	loan
DF	Dave Jones	Norwich City	
MF	Miah Dennehy	Walsall F.C.	
DF	John Cottam	Chesterfield F.C.	
GK	Dennis Peacock	Doncaster Rovers	
MF	Ian Miller	Doncaster Rovers	

==== Winter ====
In
Pos.	Name	from	Type
DF	Colin Barrett	Manchester City	£29,000

Out
Pos.	Name	To	Type
MF	Jim McIntosh	Chesterfield F.C.	loan
DF	Dave Sunley	Sheffield Wednesday	loan ended
FW	Bert Bowery	Lincoln City F.C.	
MF	George Lyall	Hull City F.C.	
DF	Paddy Greenwood	Boston Minutemen	
FW	Jimmy McCann		

== Competitions ==
=== Second Division ===
==== League Table ====
Pos	Team	Pld	W	D	L	GF	GA	GAv	Pts	Qualification or relegation
6	Southampton	42	21	7	14	66	50	1.320	49	Qualification for the Cup Winners' Cup first round (Note: Southampton qualified for the Cup Winners' Cup first round as the 1975–76 FA Cup winners.)
7	Luton Town	42	19	10	13	61	51	1.196	48	
8	Nottingham Forest	42	17	12	13	55	40	1.375	46	
9	Charlton Athletic	42	15	12	15	61	72	0.847	42	
10	Blackpool	42	14	14	14	40	49	0.816	42	

Rules for classification: 1) Points; 2) Goal average; 3) Goals scored

==== Position by round ====
Round	1	2	3	4	5	6	7	8	9	10	11	12	13	14	15	16	17	18	19	20	21	22	23	24	25	26	27	28	29	30	31	32	33	34	35	36	37	38	39	40	41	42
Ground	H	A	H	A	H	A	H	H	A	A	H	H	A	H	A	A	H	A	H	A	H	A	H	A	A	H	A	H	A	A	H	A	H	H	A	H	A	H	A	A	H	H
Result	W	D	L	D	L	W	L	L	L	D	W	D	D	W	D	L	W	W	W	D	L	L	L	W	L	L	D	W	W	D	W	D	W	W	L	W	D	W	D	L	W	W
Position	3	7	12	12	14	12	15	17	19	20	16	14	15	11	11	13	12	10	10	9	11	13	14	11	13	15	16	11	12	12	9	11	8	8	8	8	8	6	6	8	8	8

Source: Competitive matches
A = Away; H = Home; W = Win; D = Draw; L = Loss; = Leader, 1976–77 First Division; = 1976–77 First Division; = 1976–77 Third Division

A list of Nottingham Forest's matches in the 1975–76 season.

==== Matches ====
16 August 1975 1	Nottingham Forest	2-0	Plymouth Argyle	West Bridgford
	Horswill 32' (own goal); O'Hare 81'			Stadium: City Ground; Attendance: 13,083

23 August 1975 2	Portsmouth F.C.	1–1	Nottingham Forest	Portsmouth
	Went 86'		15' Bowyer	Stadium: Fratton Park; Attendance: 10,655

30 August 1975 3	Nottingham Forest	0–1	Notts County F.C.	West Bridgford
			89' Bradd	Stadium: City Ground; Attendance: 19,757

6 September 1975 4	Chelsea F.C.	0–0	Nottingham Forest	Fulham
				Stadium: Stamford Bridge; Attendance: 21,023

13 September 1975 5	Nottingham Forest	1–2	Hull City F.C.	West Bridgford
	Robertson 13'		46' Galvin; 86' Greenwood	Stadium: City Ground; Attendance: 12,191

20 September 1975 6	Oxford United	0–1	Nottingham Forest	Oxford
			88' Lyall	Stadium: Manor Ground; Attendance: 5,068

24 September 1975 7	Nottingham Forest	1–2	Charlton Athletic	West Bridgford
	Robertson 89'		34' Phil Warman; 51' John Harrison	Stadium: City Ground; Attendance: 10,588

27 September 1975 8	Nottingham Forest	1–2	Bolton Wanderers	West Bridgford
	Lyall 85'		44' Whatmore; 57' (pen.) P Jones	Stadium: City Ground; Attendance: 10,775

4 October 1975 9	Bristol Rovers	4–2	Nottingham Forest	Bristol
	Prince 30', 49'; Powell 52'; Bannister 72'		70' Robertson; 85' Bowyer	Stadium: Eastville Stadium; Attendance: 7,689

11 October 1975 10	Fulham F.C.	0–0	Nottingham Forest	Fulham
				Stadium: Craven Cottage; Attendance: 10,149

18 October 1975 11	Nottingham Forest	3–1	Southampton F.C.	West Bridgford
	O'Neill 21'; O'Hare 37'; Cottam 57'		58' Osgood	Stadium: City Ground; Attendance: 12,677

21 October 1975 12	Nottingham Forest	0–0	Luton Town	West Bridgford
				Stadium: City Ground; Attendance: 12,290

25 October 1975 13	Oldham Athletic	0–0	Nottingham Forest	Oldham
				Stadium: Boundary Park; Attendance: 11,324

1 November 1975 14	Nottingham Forest	4–0	Carlisle United	West Bridgford
	Butlin 20'; O'Hare 30'; O'Hare 70'; Curran 74' (pen.)			Stadium: City Ground; Attendance: 11,894

4 November 1975 15	Blackpool	1–1	Nottingham Forest	Blackpool
	Alan Ainscow		O'Neill	Stadium: Bloomfield Road; Attendance: 5,851

8 November 1975 16	Sunderland F.C.	3–0	Nottingham Forest	Sunderland
	Robson 30'; Halom 35', 78'			Stadium: Roker Park; Attendance: 31,227

15 November 1975 17	Nottingham Forest	1–0	Bristol City F.C.	West Bridgford
	Butlin 5'			Stadium: City Ground; Attendance: 11,583

22 November 1975 18	Southampton F.C.	0–3	Nottingham Forest	Southampton
			65' Bowyer; 75' Bowyer; 83' Richardson	Stadium: The Dell; Attendance: 14,245

29 November 1975 19	Nottingham Forest	1–0	York City	West Bridgford
	Butlin 37'			Stadium: City Ground; Attendance: 13,108

6 December 1975 20	Leyton Orient	1–1	Nottingham Forest	Leyton
	Cunningham 20'		65' Bowyer	Stadium: Brisbane Road; Attendance: 5,629

13 December 1975 21	Nottingham Forest	0–1	Portsmouth F.C.	West Bridgford
			55' McGuiness	Stadium: City Ground; Attendance: 11,343

20 December 1975 22	Plymouth Argyle	1–0	Nottingham Forest	Plymouth
	Mariner 57'			Stadium: Home Park; Attendance: 10,545

26 December 1975 23	Nottingham Forest	0–2	West Bromwich Albion	West Bridgford
			1' Giles; 2' Johnston	Stadium: City Ground; Attendance: 19,393

27 December 1975 24	Blackburn Rovers	1–4	Nottingham Forest	Blackburn
	Parkes 86'		13' Bowery; 32' Robertson; 76' Bowyer; 89' Bowery	Stadium: Ewood Park; Attendance: 10,724

10 January 1976 25	Hull City F.C.	1–0	Nottingham Forest	Kingston Upon Hull
	Wood 83'			Stadium: Boothferry Park; Attendance: 6,465

17 January 1976 26	Nottingham Forest	1–3	Chelsea F.C.	West Bridgford
	Bowyer 12'		15' Garner; 80' Wilkins; 87' Hutchinson	Stadium: City Ground; Attendance: 14,172

31 January 1976 27	Luton Town	1–1	Nottingham Forest	Luton
	R Futcher 71'		67' Curran	Stadium: Kenilworth Road; Attendance: 8,503

7 February 1976 28	Nottingham Forest	3–0	Blackpool	West Bridgford
	Curran 55'; Butlin 56'; Bowyer 80'			Stadium: City Ground; Attendance: 8,582

21 February 1976 29	Bristol City	0–2	Nottingham Forest	Bristol
			18'Curran; 50'O'Hare	Stadium: Ashton Gate; Attendance: 15,302

24 February 1976 30	Charlton Athletic	2–2	Nottingham Forest	Charlton
	Derek Hales 24', 53'		69'Bowyer; 74' McCann	Stadium: The Valley; Attendance: 10,655

28 February 1976 31	Nottingham Forest	4–3	Oldham Athletic	West Bridgford
	Butlin 6'O'Neill 37'; Curran 50' (pen.); O'Neill 74'		35' Shaw; 64' Bell; 74' Hicks	Stadium: City Ground; Attendance: 11,509

6 March 1976 32	Carlisle United	1–1	Nottingham Forest	Carlisle
	Martin 55'		15' (o.g.) Barry	Stadium: Brunton Park; Attendance: 7,153

13 March 1976 33	Nottingham Forest	1–0	Fulham F.C.	West Bridgford
	O'Hare 66'			Stadium: City Ground; Attendance: 11,445

17 March 1976 34	Nottingham Forest	2–1	Sunderland F.C.	West Bridgford
	Bowyer 3'; O'Hare 30'		28' Mel Holden	Stadium: City Ground; Attendance: 16,995

20 March 1976 35	York City	3–2	Nottingham Forest	York
	Hinch 43'; Pollard 62', 86'		78' O'Hare; Downing 84' (o.g.)	Stadium: Bootham Crescent; Attendance: 5,571

27 March 1976 36	Nottingham Forest	1–0	Leyton Orient	West Bridgford
	Bowyer 12'			Stadium: City Ground; Attendance: 11,127

3 April 1976 37	Bolton Wanderers	0–0	Nottingham Forest	Bolton
				Stadium: Burnden Park; Attendance: 22,415

10 April 1976 38	Nottingham Forest	4–0	Oxford United	West Bridgford
	Curran 80' (pen.); O'Neil 78'; Butlin 74'; Robertson 89'			Stadium: City Ground; Attendance: 11,259

13 April 1976 39	Notts County	0–0	Nottingham Forest	West Bridgford
				Stadium: City Ground; Attendance: 29,279

17 April 1976 40	West Bromwich Albion	2–0	Nottingham Forest	West Bromwich
	Martin 55'; Johnston 67'			Stadium: The Hawthorns; Attendance: 26,447

20 April 1976 41	Nottingham Forest	1–0	Blackburn Rovers	West Bridgford
	Butlin			Stadium: City Ground; Attendance: 13,006

24 April 1976 42	Nottingham Forest	3–0	Bristol Rovers	West Bridgford
	O'Hare 61'; Bowyer 63', 76'			Stadium: City Ground; Attendance: 12,127

=== League Cup ===
==== First round ====
19 August 1975 1	Rotherham United	1–2	Nottingham Forest	Rotherham
			Chapman; McGovern	Attendance: 4,912

27 August 1975 2	Nottingham Forest	5–1 (7–2 agg.)	Rotherham United	Nottingham
	Paul Richardson, George Lyall (pen.); George Lyall (pen.); Ian Bowyer		} Jimmy Goodfellow	Stadium: City Ground; Attendance: 7,977

==== Second round ====
10 September 1975	Nottingham Forest	1–0	Plymouth Argyle	Nottingham
			84' Bowyer	Stadium: City Ground; Attendance: 8,978

==== Third round ====
8 October 1975	Manchester City	2–1	Nottingham Forest	Moss Side
	Colin Bell; Joe Royle		Bowyer	Stadium: Maine Road; Attendance: 26,536

=== FA Cup ===
==== Third round ====
1 January 1976 1	Nottingham Forest	0–0	Peterborough United	Nottingham
				Stadium: City Ground; Attendance: 31,525

7 January 1976 replay	Peterborough United	1–0 (1–0 agg.)	Nottingham Forest	Peterborough
	Jon Nixon 22'			Stadium: London Road; Attendance: 17,886

== Statistics ==
=== Players statistics ===
The statistics for the following players are for their time during 1975–76 season playing for Nottingham Forest. Any stats from a different club during 1974–75 are not included. Includes all competitive matches.

No.	Pos	Nat	Player	Total		Football League Second Division		Football League Cup		FA Cup	
No.	Pos	Nat	Player	Apps	Goals	Apps	Goals	Apps	Goals	Apps	Goals
	GK	(England) ENG	Wells	25	0	23	0	0	0	2	0
	DF	(England) ENG	Anderson	24	0	21	0	3	0		
	DF	(Scotland) SCO	McGovern	47	1	41	0	4	1	2	0
	DF	(England) ENG	Chapman	43	1	37	0	4	1	2	0
	DF	(England) ENG	Clark	48	0	42	0	4	0	2	0
	MF	(Northern Ireland) NIR	O'Neill	31	5	28+1	5	2	0		
	MF	(England) ENG	Curran	33	6	33	6				
	MF	(England) ENG	Bowyer	46	14	40	11	4	3	2	0
	MF	(Scotland) SCO	Robertson	42	5	34+3	5	4	0	1	0
	FW	(England) ENG	Butlin	38	8	32	7	4	1	2	0
	FW	(Scotland) SCO	O'Hare	45	9	38+1	9	4	0	2	0
	GK	(England) ENG	Middleton	23	0	19	0	4	0		
	MF	(England) ENG	Richardson	28	3	22+1	1	4	2	1	0
	DF	(England) ENG	Gunn	14	0	11	0	3	0		
	DF	(England) ENG	Barrett	10	0	10	0				
	DF	(England) ENG	Cottam	9	1	8	1	1	0		
	DF	(Northern Ireland) NIR	O'Kane	11	0	8	0	1	0	2	0
	MF	(Scotland) SCO	Lyall	7	4	3+2	2	2	2		
	FW	(England) ENG	McCann	5	1	1+4	1				
	FW	(England) ENG	Bowery	3	2	1	2	0	0	2	0
	DF	(England) ENG	Sunley	1	0	1	0				
	MF	(England) ENG	McIntosh	3	0	0+1	0	0	0	2	0
	DF	(England) ENG	Greenwood								

- Source: https://www.11v11.com/teams/nottingham-forest/tab/players/season/1976/
