= 1976–77 Nottingham Forest F.C. season =

English football club season

Nottingham Forest F.C.
1976–77 season
- Chairman: BJ Appleby, QC
- Manager: Brian Clough
- Stadium: City Ground
- Second Division: 3rd (in 1977–78 First Division)
- FA Cup: Fourth round
- League Cup: Third round
- Top goalscorer: League: Peter Withe (16); All: Withe (19)
- Highest home attendance: 31,004 (8 March 1977 v Notts County) (League); 38,284 (Cup)
- Lowest home attendance: 12,393 (League); 12,717 (Cup)
- Average home league attendance: 20,540 (League)
Home colours	Away colours

The 1976–77 season was Nottingham Forest's 112th year in existence and fifth campaign consecutive in the Second Division since their relegation in 1972.

== Summary ==
During summer chairman BJ Appleby appointed Brighton & Hove Albion manager Peter Taylor as new assistant manager for Clough, now in his third season with the club. The 1972 First Division Champion Duo was reunited again after two campaigns now in Second Division. The club reinforced the squad with several players, for the offensive line arriving striker Garry Birtles from Long Eaton United, forward Peter Withe was bought from Birmingham City. and Taylor asked for the return of Tony Woodcock after a loan spell from Lincoln City F.C. The defensive line had a poor performance through September, Middleton replaced Wells as Goalkeeper starter and Taylor asked for the transfer in of central-back defender Larry Lloyd arriving from Coventry City during October allowing McGovern came back as midfielder. Forest ended their season by beating Millwall 1–0, thanks to an own goal by Moore netting the winner, leaving them on 52 points with Bolton Wanderers (who draw Luton Town 1–1 on the same day) on 48 with three more games to play. Forest's destiny was not in their own hands, on 10 May Bolton won 2–1 to Cardiff City netting 50 and needed only two points in two more matches to overtake Forest.

On 14 May, Wolverhampton Wanderers beat Bolton Wanderers 1–0 at Burnden Park. In their final match Bolton only draw 2–2 to Bristol Rovers. The promotion was unusually close throughout the campaign and the final table saw Forest clinching the last 3rd spot just one point ahead of the teams in 4th (Bolton) and 5th (Blackpool). Therefore, the club was promoted to the Division One for the first time since being relegated in the 1971–72 season.

Also, the squad clinched the Anglo-Scottish Cup in December 1976, their first piece of silverware since the FA Cup in 1959 after defeated Leyton Orient in the Finals with a massive 5–1 aggregate score.

Meanwhile, in League Cup the club advanced to the third round being defeated by Coventry City. In FA Cup the squad was eliminated in fourth round after a replay against Southampton F.C.

== Squad ==
Note: Flags indicate national team as defined under FIFA eligibility rules; some limited exceptions apply. Players may hold more than one non-FIFA nationality.

Pos.	Nation	Player
GK	ENG	John Middleton
GK	ENG	Chris Woods
GK	ENG	Peter Wells
DF	ENG	Viv Anderson
DF	ENG	Frank Clark
DF	SCO	John McGovern
DF	ENG	Sammy Chapman (c)
DF	ENG	Larry Lloyd
DF	ENG	Colin Barrett
DF	ENG	Bryn Gunn
DF	ENG	Glyn Saunders
MF	ENG	Terry Curran
MF	ENG	Ian Bowyer

Pos.	Nation	Player
MF	ENG	Bert Bowery
MF	ENG	Steve Burke
MF	NIR	Martin O'Neill
MF	SCO	John Robertson
MF	SCO	George Lyall
MF	ENG	Sean Haslegrave
FW	SCO	John O'Hare
FW	ENG	Barry Butlin
FW	ENG	Tony Woodcock
FW	ENG	Garry Birtles
FW	ENG	Peter Withe

=== Transfers ===
In
Pos.	Name	from	Type
MF	Sean Haslegrave	Stoke City	£50,000
FW	Garry Birtles	Long Eaton United	£2,000
FW	Peter Withe	Birmingham City	
DF	Larry Lloyd	Coventry City	£49,000
FW	Tony Woodcock	Lincoln City	loan ended
MF	Steve Burke	Youth team	
GK	Chris Woods	Youth team	

Out
Pos.	Name	To	Type
FW	Tony Woodcock	Lincoln City	loan
DF	Glynn Saunders		
MF	Paul Richardson	Chester City F.C.	
DF	John Cottam	Chesterfield F.C.	
DF	Liam O'Kane		retired
DF	David Sunley	Hull City F.C.	
GK	Peter Wells	Southampton F.C.	

==== Winter ====
In
Pos.	Name	from	Type
FW	Tony Woodcock	Lincoln City	loan ended

Out
Pos.	Name	To	Type
MF	Bert Bowery	Boston Minutemen	

== Competitions ==
=== Second Division ===
==== League Table ====
Pos	Team	Pld	W	D	L	GF	GA	GD	Pts	Qualification or relegation
1	Wolverhampton Wanderers (C, P)	42	22	13	7	84	45	+39	57	Promotion to the First Division
2	Chelsea (P)	42	21	13	8	73	53	+20	55	Promotion to the First Division
3	Nottingham Forest (P)	42	21	10	11	77	43	+34	52	Promotion to the First Division
4	Bolton Wanderers	42	20	11	11	75	54	+21	51	
5	Blackpool	42	17	17	8	58	42	+16	51	

Rules for classification: 1) Points; 2) Goal difference; 3) Goals scored
(C) Champions; (P) Promoted

==== Position by round ====
Round	1	2	3	4	5	6	7	8	9	10	11	12	13	14	15	16	17	18	19	20	21	22	23	24	25	26	27	28	29	30	31	32	33	34	35	36	37	38	39	40	41	42
Ground	A	H	H	A	H	A	H	A	H	A	H	A	H	A	H	A	H	A	H	A	A	A	H	A	H	A	A	H	H	A	H	H	H	A	H	A	A	H	H	A	A	H
Result	D	D	L	D	W	D	W	L	W	L	W	L	W	W	D	W	W	W	D	D	W	L	W	L	L	W	D	L	W	L	W	W	W	W	W	D	L	L	W	D	W	W
Position	10	13	17	15	13	12	7	11	4	8	5	8	6	5	5	5	5	2	3	4	4	4	3	4	5	6	7	7	7	7	7	5	4	3	3	3	4	4	3	3	3	3

Source: Competitive matches
A = Away; H = Home; W = Win; D = Draw; L = Loss; = Leader, 1977–78 First Division; = 1977–78 First Division; = 1977–78 Third Division

A list of Nottingham Forest's matches in the 1976–77 season.

==== Matches ====
21 August 1976 1	Fulham	2–2	Nottingham Forest	Fulham
	Lacy 38'; Mitchell 45'		23' Curran; 63' O'Hare	Stadium: Craven Cottage; Attendance: 9,437

25 August 1976 2	Nottingham Forest	1–1	Charlton Athletic	West Bridgford
	Curran 33' (pen.)		6' Hales	Stadium: City Ground; Attendance: 12,662

28 August 1976 3	Nottingham Forest	1–3	Wolverhampton Wanderers	West Bridgford
	Daley 18' (o.g.)		14', 73' Gould; 16' Dailey 16	Stadium: City Ground; Attendance: 17,222

4 September 1976 4	Luton Town	1–1	Nottingham Forest	Luton
	Barrett 89' (o.g.)		30' (pen.) Curran	Stadium: Kenilworth Road

11 September 1976 5	Nottingham Forest	4–3	Hereford United	West Bridgford
	Bowyer 33'; Butlin 37'; Butlin 74'; Robertson 64'		11', 75' McNeil; 17' Spiring	Stadium: City Ground; Attendance: 12,081

18 September 1976 6	Southampton	1–1	Nottingham Forest	Southampton
	Stokes 9'		28' Bowyer	Stadium: The Dell; Attendance: 23,006

25 September 1976 7	Nottingham Forest	5–1	Carlisle United	West Bridgford
	O'Hare 19'; Bowyer 69', 89'; Barratt 72'; Withe 78'		7' Barry	Stadium: City Ground; Attendance: 12,479

2 October 1976 8	Hull City	1–0	Nottingham Forest	Kingston upon Hull
	Bremner 40'			Stadium: Boothferry Park; Attendance: 16,096

9 October 1976 9	Nottingham Forest	6–1	Sheffield United	West Bridgford
	Bowyer 11'; Butlin 36'; Bowyer 41'; Curran 48'; Withe 56'; Anderson 61'		38' (pen.) Ian 'Chico' Hamilton	Stadium: City Ground; Attendance: 17,801

16 October 1976 10	Blackpool	1–0	Nottingham Forest	Blackpool
	Walsh 64'			Stadium: Bloomfield Road; Attendance: 17,089

23 October 1976 11	Nottingham Forest	5–2	Burnley	West Bridgford
	Curran 3'; Robertson 50' (pen.); Butlin 54'; O'Neill 76', 80'		19' Flynn; 48' Smith	Stadium: City Ground; Attendance: 15,281

30 October 1976 12	Oldham Athletic	1–0	Nottingham Forest	Oldham
	Halom 31'			Stadium: Boundary Park; Attendance: 10,597

6 November 1976 13	Nottingham Forest	3–0	Blackburn Rovers	West Bridgford
	Bowyer 7'; Withe 52'; Haslegrave 77'			Stadium: City Ground; Attendance: 12,972

13 November 1976 14	Leyton Orient	0–1	Nottingham Forest	Leyton
			74' Woodcock	Stadium: Brisbane Road; Attendance: 27,089

20 November 1976 15	Nottingham Forest	1–1	Chelsea	West Bridgford
	O'Neill 34'		38' Britton	Stadium: City Ground; Attendance: 27,089

27 November 1976 16	Cardiff City	0–3	Nottingham Forest	Cardiff
			1'Withe; 43'Chapman; 88' Woodcock	Stadium: Ninian Park; Attendance: 12,770

4 December 1976 17	Nottingham Forest	4–2	Bristol Rovers	West Bridgford
	Robertson 13' (pen.); Woodcock 65'; Robertson 74'; Withe 88'		30' David Williams; 38' Gordon Fearnley	Stadium: City Ground; Attendance: 16,302

11 December 1976 18	Millwall	0–2	Nottingham Forest	Bermondsey
			11' O'Neill; 79' O'Hare	Stadium: The Den; Attendance: 9,307

18 December 1976 19	Nottingham Forest	1–1	Plymouth Argyle	West Bridgford
	Barrett 88'		12' Austin	Stadium: City Ground; Attendance: 15,180

27 December 1976 20	Bolton Wanderers	1–1	Nottingham Forest	Bolton
	Whatmore 46'		1' Withe	Stadium: Burnden Park; Attendance: 31,313

1 January 1977 21	Blackburn Rovers	1–3	Nottingham Forest	Blackburn
	Alcock 29'		23' Withe; 27' Woodcock; 82'Bowyer	Stadium: Ewood Park; Attendance: 14,534

14 January 1977 22	Charlton Athletic	2–1	Nottingham Forest	Charlton
	Mike Flanagan 23'; Hugh McAuley 34'		37' Bowyer	Stadium: The Valley; Attendance: 8,021

22 January 1977 23	Nottingham Forest	3–0	Fulham	West Bridgford
	Lloyd 83'; O'Neill 85'; Woodcock 86'			Stadium: City Ground; Attendance: 24,718

5 February 1977 24	Wolverhampton Wanderers	2–1	Nottingham Forest	Wolverhampton
	Carr 32'; Richards 35'		89' Chapman	Stadium: Molineux Stadium; Attendance: 30,661

12 February 1977 25	Nottingham Forest	1–2	Luton Town	West Bridgford
	Lloyd 86'		55' R Futcher; 71' Aston	Stadium: City Ground; Attendance: 18,225

16 February 1977 26	Nottingham Forest	abd.	Southampton	West Bridgford
			1' Holmes	Stadium: City Ground
Note: Match abandoned at 47' due to fog.

2 March 1977 27	Hereford United	0–1	Nottingham Forest	Hereford
			38' Curran	Stadium: Edgar Street; Attendance: 7,503

5 March 1977 28	Carlisle United	1–1	Nottingham Forest	Carlisle
	Martin 78'		72' (pen.) Robertson	Stadium: Brunton Park

8 March 1977 29	Nottingham Forest	1–2	Notts County	West Bridgford
	Withe 86'		53' (o.g.) Viv Anderson; 63' (pen.) Steve Carter	Stadium: City Ground; Attendance: 31,004; Referee: DW Civil

12 March 1977 30	Nottingham Forest	2–0	Hull City	West Bridgford
	Woodcock 4'; Withe 45'			Stadium: City Ground; Attendance: 15,126

19 March 1977 31	Sheffield United	2–0	Nottingham Forest	Sheffield
	Edwards 37', 89'			Stadium: Bramall Lane; Attendance: 20,370

22 March 1977 26	Nottingham Forest	2–1	Southampton	West Bridgford
	Woodcock 21'; O'Neill 55'		65' Rodrigues	Stadium: City Ground; Attendance: 12,393

26 March 1977 32	Nottingham Forest	3–0	Blackpool	West Bridgford
	Withe 43'; Woodcock 45'; Withe 80'			Stadium: City Ground; Attendance: 16,658

29 March 1977 33	Nottingham Forest	3–0	Leyton Orient	West Bridgford
	Robertson (penalty missed) 14'; Withe 31'; Withe 35'; Lloyd 60'			Stadium: City Ground; Attendance: 16,267
Note: Jackson saved a John Robertson penalty in the 14th minute

2 April 1977 34	Burnley	0–1	Nottingham Forest	Burnley
			65' Woodcock	Stadium: Turf Moor; Attendance: 10,904

6 April 1977 35	Nottingham Forest	3–1	Bolton Wanderers	West Bridgford
	O'Neill 44'; Withe 53'; Bowyer 82'		72' Paul Jones	Stadium: City Ground; Attendance: 24,580

9 April 1977 36	Notts County	1–1	Nottingham Forest	West Bridgford
	Bradd 17'		27' Withe	Stadium: City Ground; Attendance: 32,518

16 April 1977 37	Chelsea	2–1	Nottingham Forest	Fulham
15:00	Britton 63'; Finnieston 87'	Report	42' O'Neill	Stadium: Stamford Bridge; Attendance: 36,499; Referee: Ron Chalis

23 April 1977 38	Nottingham Forest	0–1	Cardiff City	West Bridgford
			25' Sayer	Stadium: City Ground; Attendance: 20,646

27 April 1977 39	Nottingham Forest	3–0	Oldham Athletic	West Bridgford
	Bowyer 38'; O'Neill 83'; Woodcock 49'			Stadium: City Ground; Attendance: 17,139

30 April 1977 40	Bristol Rovers	1–1	Nottingham Forest	Bristol
	Bater 62'		84' Robertson	Stadium: Eastville; Attendance: 8,893

2 May 1977 41	Plymouth Argyle	1–2	Nottingham Forest	Plymouth
	Bruce Bannister 19'		29' Woodcock; 52' Withe	Stadium: Home Park; Attendance: 13,542

7 May 1977 42	Nottingham Forest	1–0	Millwall	West Bridgford
	Moore 15' (o.g.)			Stadium: City Ground; Attendance: 23,529

=== League Cup ===
==== Second round ====
31 August 1976	Walsall F.C.	2–4	Nottingham Forest	Walsall
	Alan Buckley 24'; Bernie Wright 86'		17' Curran; 41' Barrett; 62' O'Neill; 80' O'Neill	Stadium: Fellows Park; Attendance: 8,437

==== Third round ====
21 September 1976	Nottingham Forest	0–3	Coventry City	Nottingham
			23' Mick Ferguson; 30' (pen.) Mick Coop; 39' Les Cartwright	Stadium: City Ground; Attendance: 15,969; Referee: TP Bosi

=== FA Cup ===
==== Third round ====
8 January 1977	Nottingham Forest	1–1	Bristol Rovers	Nottingham
	John Robertson 53' (pen)		David Williams 77'	Stadium: City Ground; Attendance: 17,770

8 January 1977 replay	Bristol Rovers	1–1 (a.e.t.)	Nottingham Forest	Bristol
	Alan Warboys		Tony Woodcock	Stadium: 12,348

18 January 1977 2nd replay	Nottingham Forest	6–0	Bristol Rovers	Birmingham
	Woodcock 10'; Anderson 72'; Bowyer 52'; O'Hare 76'; Withe 59' Woodcock 60'			Stadium: Villa Park; Attendance: 5,736

==== Fourth round ====
29 January 1977	Nottingham Forest	3–3	Southampton F.C.	Nottingham
	Robertson 38' (pen.); Robertson 66'; Woodcock 69'		52' Alan Ball; 57' Mick Channon; 68' Peter Osgood	Stadium: City Ground; Attendance: 38,284

1 February 1977 2nd replay	Southampton F.C.	2–1	Nottingham Forest	Southampton
	Woodcock 18'		10' Ted MacDougall; 66'	Stadium: The Dell; Attendance: 29,401

=== Anglo-Scottish Cup ===
==== First round ====
7 August 1976 1	Notts County (England)	0–0	(England) Nottingham Forest	Nottingham
				Stadium: City Ground

11 August 1976 2	Nottingham Forest (England)	3–2	(England) West Bromwich Albion	Nottingham
	Curran; Curran; Butlin			Stadium: City Ground

14 August 1976 3	Nottingham Forest (England)	4–2	(England) Bristol City	Nottingham
	Butlin; Butlin			Stadium: City Ground

==== Quarterfinals ====
14 September 1976 3	Nottingham Forest (England)	2–1	(Scotland) Kilmarnock F.C.	Nottingham
	Sammy Chapman; Robertson			Stadium: City Ground

28 September 1976 3	Kilmarnock F.C. (Scotland)	2–2	(England) Nottingham Forest	Kilmarnock
			Curran; Curran

==== Semifinals ====
20 October 1976	Nottingham Forest (England)	2–2	(Scotland) Ayr United	Nottingham
	Lloyd; Withe			Stadium: City Ground

3 November 1976	Ayr United (Scotland)	0–2	(England) Nottingham Forest
			Withe; Woodcock

==== Final ====
13 December 1976	Leyton Orient (England)	1–1	(England) Nottingham Forest	Leyton
			Robertson	Attendance: 5,058

15 December 1976	Nottingham Forest (England)	4–0 (5–1 agg.)	(England) Leyton Orient	Nottingham
	Chapman; Barrett; Barrett; Bowyer			Stadium: City Ground; Attendance: 12,717

== Statistics ==
=== Players statistics ===
The statistics for the following players are for their time during 1976–77 season playing for Nottingham Forest. Any stats from a different club during 1976–77 are not included. Includes all competitive matches.

No.	Pos	Nat	Player	Total		Football League Division Two		Football League Cup		FA Cup		Anglo-Scottish Cup	
No.	Pos	Nat	Player	Apps	Goals	Apps	Goals	Apps	Goals	Apps	Goals	Apps	Goals
	GK	(England) ENG	Middleton	49	-47	38	-34	1	-2	5	-7	5	-4
	DF	(England) ENG	Anderson	49	2	32+3	1	3	0	5	1	6	0
	DF	(England) ENG	Lloyd	34	4	26	3	0	0	5	0	3	1
	DF	(England) ENG	Chapman	41	4	29+2	2	2	0	2	0	6	2
	DF	(England) ENG	Clark	56	0	42	0	2	0	5	0	7	0
	MF	(Northern Ireland) NIR	O'Neill	51	11	36+2	9	2	2	5	0	6	0
	MF	(England) ENG	Bowyer	57	14	41	12	2	0	5	1	9	1
	MF	(Scotland) SCO	McGovern	51	0	39	0	2	0	3	0	7	0
	MF	(Scotland) SCO	Robertson	57	11	41	6	2	0	5	3	9	2
	FW	(England) ENG	Withe	42	19	32+1	16	0	0	5	1	4	2
	FW	(England) ENG	Woodcock	37	17	30	11	0	0	5	5	2	1
	GK	(England) ENG	Wells	9	-17	4	-9	1	-3	0	0	4	-5
	FW	(Scotland) SCO	O'Hare	32	6	16+3	3	2	1	5	0	6	2
	MF	(England) ENG	Curran	20	12	11+2	7	2	1	0	0	5	4
	DF	(England) ENG	Barrett	17	5	10	2	2	1	0	0	5	2
	FW	(England) ENG	Butlin	17	6	8+2	3	2	0	0	0	5	3
	MF	(England) ENG	Haslegrave	11	1	3+2	1	0	0	0	0	6	0
	DF	(England) ENG	Saunders	7	0	4	0	0	0	0	0	3	0
	FW	(England) ENG	Birtles	1	0	1	0						
	FW	(England) ENG	Bowery	2	0	1	0	0	0	0	0	1	0
	GK	(England) ENG	Woods	0	0	0	0	0	0	0	0		
	MF	(England) ENG	Burke	1	0	0+1	0						
	MF	(England) ENG	Richardson	1	0	0+1	0						
	DF	(England) ENG	Gunn										

- Source: https://www.11v11.com/teams/nottingham-forest/tab/players/season/1977/
