= 1980–81 Nottingham Forest F.C. season =

English football club season

Nottingham Forest
1980–81 season
- Chairman: Geoffrey McPherson
- Manager: Brian Clough
- Stadium: The City Ground
- First Division: 7th
- FA Cup: Quarter-finals
- League Cup: Fourth round
- European Cup: Round of 32
- European Super Cup: Runners-up
- Intercontinental Cup: Runners-up
- Top goalscorer: League: Ian Wallace (11); All: Ian Wallace (13)
- Highest home attendance: 32,266 (League)
- Lowest home attendance: 21,242 (League)
- Average home league attendance: 26,330 (League)
Home colours	Away colours

The 1980–81 season was Nottingham Forest's 116th year in existence and fourth consecutive season in the First Division.

== Summary ==
In May, the board appointed Geoffrey McPherson as the club's new chairman, replacing Stuart Dryden. On 30 May McPherson negotiated a new three-year new contract for Clough and Taylor after they won the European Cup Final. The club reinforced the squad, with forward Ian Wallace signing from Coventry City for £1.25 million and Swiss player Raimondo Ponte signing from Grasshopper Club Zürich, to boost an ageing midfield. On 15 October, the club sold Garry Birtles to Manchester United for £1.25 million, prompting the arrival of forward Peter Ward from Brighton & Hove Albion. In spite of these new arrivals, during the season the team dropped to mid-table, and by spring the midfield was weakened after the departures of Martin O'Neill, Raimondo Ponte, Ian Bowyer and defender Larry Lloyd. Forward Trevor Francis suffered an injury that sidelined him until December. Forest finished the season in 7th place, missing out on qualification for the following season's UEFA Cup after a draw 1–1 with Coventry City on the final day, with Southampton taking the European berth on goal difference.

Forest's defence of the European Cup ended in the first round following a 2–0 aggregate defeat to Bulgarian side CSKA Sofia. In the League Cup the team was eliminated in the fourth round by Watford. The club lost the European Super Cup on away goals to Valencia CF. In February, the team lost the Intercontinental Cup 1–0 to Nacional in Tokyo. Finally, in the FA Cup the team was knocked out at the quarter-final stage following a replay with Ipswich Town. Also, after seven seasons Scottish trainer Jimmy Gordon announced his retirement.

== Squad ==
Note: Flags indicate national team as defined under FIFA eligibility rules; some limited exceptions apply. Players may hold more than one non-FIFA nationality.

Pos.	Nation	Player
GK	ENG	Peter Shilton
GK	ENG	Steve Sutton
GK	ENG	Lee Smelt
DF	ENG	Viv Anderson
DF	ENG	Larry Lloyd
DF	SCO	Kenny Burns
DF	SCO	Frank Gray
DF	ENG	Bryn Gunn
DF	ENG	David Needham
DF	NOR	Einar Aas
DF	ENG	Stephen Kendal

Pos.	Nation	Player
MF	ENG	Stuart Gray
MF	SCO	Colin Walsh
MF	NIR	Martin O'Neill
MF	SCO	John McGovern (c)
MF	SCO	John Robertson
MF	ENG	Ian Bowyer
MF	ENG	Gary Mills
MF	SUI	Raimondo Ponte
FW	ENG	Trevor Francis
FW	ENG	Peter Ward
FW	ENG	Garry Birtles
FW	ENG	Ian Wallace

=== Transfers ===
In
Pos.	Name	from	Type
FW	Ian Wallace	Coventry City	£1,250,000 (Note: Transferred in on 16 August 1980)
MF	Raimondo Ponte	Grasshopper Club Zürich	(Note: Transferred in on 16 August 1980)
MF	Stuart Gray	Youth system	
DF	Stephen Kendal		
GK	Lee Smelt		

Out
Pos.	Name	To	Type
FW	John O'Hare		Retired
FW	Charlie George	Southampton	loan ended
GK	Lee Smelt	Peterborough United	
GK	Jimmy Montgomery		retired

==== Autumn ====
In
Pos.	Name	from	Type
FW	Peter Ward	Brighton & Hove Albion	(Note: Transferred in on 1 October 1980)

Out
Pos.	Name	To	Type
FW	Garry Birtles	Manchester United	£1,250,000 (Note: Transferred out on 15 October 1980)

==== Winter ====
In
Pos.	Name	from	Type

Out
Pos.	Name	To	Type
MF	Martin O'Neill	Norwich City	(Note: Transferred out on 22 February 1981)
MF	Ian Bowyer	Sunderland	(Note: Transferred out on 15 January 1981)
DF	Larry Lloyd	Wigan Athletic	(Note: Transferred out on 11 February 1981)

==== Spring ====
In
Pos.	Name	from	Type
DF	Einar Aas	Bayern München	(Note: Transferred in on 4 April 1981)

Out
Pos.	Name	To	Type
MF	Raimondo Ponte	SC Bastia	(Note: Transferred out on 28 March 1981)

== Competitions ==
A list of Nottingham Forest's matches in the 1980–81 season.

=== First Division ===
==== League table ====
Pos	Team	Pld	W	D	L	GF	GA	GD	Pts	Qualification or relegation
5	Liverpool	42	17	17	8	62	42	+20	51	Qualification for the European Cup first round (Note: Liverpool qualified for the European Cup first round as the 1980–81 European Cup winners.)
6	Southampton	42	20	10	12	76	56	+20	50	Qualification for the UEFA Cup first round
7	Nottingham Forest	42	19	12	11	62	44	+18	50	
8	Manchester United	42	15	18	9	51	36	+15	48	
9	Leeds United	42	17	10	15	39	47	−8	44	

Source: World Football
Rules for classification: 1) Points; 2) Goal difference; 3) Goals scored

==== Results by round ====
Round	1	2	3	4	5	6	7	8	9	10	11	12	13	14	15	16	17	18	19	20	21	22	23	24	25	26	27	28	29	30	31	32	33	34	35	36	37	38	39	40	41	42
Ground	A	H	A	H	A	H	H	A	H	A	A	H	H	A	H	A	A	H	H	A	H	A	H	A	H	A	H	A	A	H	A	H	H	A	A	H	A	H	A	H	A	H
Result	L	W	D	W	D	W	W	L	L	D	W	W	W	D	W	D	L	L	L	D	W	L	W	W	D	L	W	D	W	W	D	W	W	D	L	W	L	D	L	W	W	D
Position	18	14	13	6	6	4	2	5	8	9	6	5	5	4	3	3	4	7	8	8	8	8	7	5	5	7	8	8	6	6	5	4	3	3	6	3	6	6	8	6	4	7

Source: Competitive matches
A = Away; H = Home; W = Win; D = Draw; L = Loss; = Leader, 1981–82 European Cup; = 1981-82 UEFA Cup; = 1981–82 Second Division

==== Matches ====
16 August 1980 1	Tottenham Hotspur	2–0	Nottingham Forest	Tottenham
	Hoddle 48' (pen.); Crooks 77'			Stadium: White Hart Lane; Attendance: 43,270

20 August 1980 2	Nottingham Forest	2–1	Birmingham City	West Bridgford
	Birtles 37'; Ponte 62'; O'Neill (red card)		46' Worthington; (red card) Dennis	Stadium: City Ground; Attendance: 26,561

23 August 1980 3	Everton	0–0	Nottingham Forest	Walton
				Stadium: Goodison Park; Attendance: 25,981

30 August 1980 4	Nottingham Forest	5–0	Stoke City	West Bridgford
	Wallace 10'; Birtles 31'; Robertson 76' (pen.); Wallace 77'; Birtles 82'			Stadium: City Ground; Attendance: 21,915

6 September 1980 5	Middlesbrough	0–0	Nottingham Forest	Middlesbrough
				Stadium: Ayresome Park; Attendance: 17,119

13 September 1980 6	Nottingham Forest	3–2	Manchester City	West Bridgford
	Birtles 16'; Bowyer 46'; Wallace 49'		25' D.Bennett; 34' Henry	Stadium: City Ground; Attendance: 23,184

20 September 1980 7	Nottingham Forest	5–0	Leicester City	West Bridgford
	F. Gray 12'; Robertson 72' (pen.); Birtles 81'; Mills 86'; Birtles 89'			Stadium: City Ground; Attendance: 27,145

27 September 1980 8	Arsenal	1–0	Nottingham Forest	Islington
	Rix 50'			Stadium: Highbury; Attendance: 37,584

4 October 1980 9	Nottingham Forest	1–2	Manchester United	West Bridgford
	I.Wallace 31'		Macari 43'; 74' Coppell	Stadium: City Ground; Attendance: 29,801

8 October 1980 10	Sunderland	2–2	Nottingham Forest	Sunderland
	Rowell 27'; Brown 36'		69' Mills; 72' Bowyer	Stadium: Roker Park; Attendance: 30,515

11 October 1980 11	Brighton & Hove Albion	0–1	Nottingham Forest	Brighton
			31' Wallace	Stadium: Goldstone Ground; Attendance: 17,420

18 October 1990 12	Nottingham Forest	2–1	West Bromwich Albion	West Bridgford
	Bowyer 36'; G.Mills 41'		Moses 15'	Stadium: City Ground; Attendance: 25,095

22 October 1980 13	Nottingham Forest	2–1	Leeds United	West Bridgford
	Burns 38'; Wallace 44'		28' Harris	Stadium: City Ground; Attendance: 25,033

25 October 1980 14	Norwich City	1–1	Nottingham Forest	Norwich
	Royle 53'		49' Robertson	Stadium: Carrow Road; Attendance: 17,849

1 November 1980 15	Nottingham Forest	2–1	Southampton	West Bridgford
	Ward 7'; Robertson 44' (pen.)		13' Moran	Stadium: City Ground; Attendance: 24,669

8 November 1980 16	Liverpool	0–0	Nottingham Forest	Liverpool
				Stadium: Anfield Road; Attendance: 43,143

11 November 1980 17	Birmingham City	2–0	Nottingham Forest	Birmingham
	Worthington 4'; Worthington 62'			Stadium: St. Andrew's Park; Attendance: 22,433

15 November 1980 18	Nottingham Forest	0–3	Tottenham Hotspur	West Bridgford
			47' Archibald; 53' Ardiles; 83' Archibald 83'	Stadium: City Ground; Attendance: 25,400

22 November 1980 19	Nottingham Forest	1–2	Ipswich Town	West Bridgford
	Wallace 76'		37' Brazil; 78' (pen.) Wark	Stadium: City Ground; Attendance: 24,423

29 November 1980 20	Coventry City	1–1	Nottingham Forest	Coventry
	Daly 51' (pen.)		25' Wallace	Stadium: Highfield Road; Attendance: 15,171

6 December 1980 21	Nottingham Forest	3–0	Crystal Palace	West Bridgford
	0 F.Gray 47' (pen.); Walsh 66'; Ward 72'			Stadium: City Ground; Attendance: 20,223

13 December 1980 22	Leeds United	1–0	Nottingham Forest	Leeds
	Greenhoff 55'			Stadium: Ellan Road; Attendance: 21,882

20 December 1980 23	Nottingham Forest	3–1	Sunderland	West Bridgford
	Ponte 15'; Walsh 41'; T.Francis 51'		53' Rowell	Stadium: City Ground; Attendance: 23,151

26 December 1980 24	Wolverhampton Wanderers	1–4	Nottingham Forest	Wolverhampton
	J.Richards 70' (pen.)		: Brazier 30' (o.g); F.Gray 63' (pen.); Palmer 66' (o.g.); Ponte 73'	Stadium: Molineux; Attendance: 31,558

27 December 1980 25	Nottingham Forest	2–2	Aston Villa	West Bridgford
	Francis 41'; O’Neill 88'		17' (o.g.) Lloyd; 68' G.Shaw	Stadium: City Ground; Attendance: 33,930

10 January 1981 26	Ipswich Town	2–0	Nottingham Forest	Ipswich
	Mariner 53'; Mühren 74'			Stadium: Portman Road; Attendance: 25,701

31 January 1981 28	Nottingham Forest	1–0	Everton	West Bridgford
	Burns 34'			Stadium: City Ground; Attendance: 25,611

7 February 1981 29	Manchester City	1–1	Nottingham Forest	Moss Side
	Power 11'		55' Francis	Stadium: Maine Road; Attendance: 39,524

18 February 1981 30	Stoke City	1–2	Nottingham Forest	Stoke
	Heath 51'		8' (o.g.) Doyle; 56' Walsh	Stadium: Victoria Ground; Attendance: 39,524

21 February 1981 31	Nottingham Forest	3–1	Arsenal	West Bridgford
	O’Neill 9'; O'Neill 14'; Burns 74'		29' Stapleton	Stadium: City Ground; Attendance: 25,357

28 February 1981 32	Leicester City	1–1	Nottingham Forest	Leicester
	Lynex 45'		90' Walsh	Stadium: Filbert Street; Attendance: 26,608

3 March 1981 33	Nottingham Forest	1–0	Middlesbrough	West Bridgford
	Burns 82'			Stadium: City Ground; Attendance: 19,690

14 March 1981 34	Nottingham Forest	4–1	Brighton & Hove Albion	West Bridgford
	Robertson 30' (pen.); Wallace 38'; Mills 52'; Burns 69'		20' Stille	Stadium: City Ground; Attendance: 20,688

18 March 1981 35	Manchester United	1–1	Nottingham Forest	Greater Manchester
	Wallace 38'		44' K.Burns	Stadium: Old Trafford; Attendance: 38,205

21 March 1981 27 (Note: Match re-scheduled from 13 January 1981)	West Bromwich Albion	2–1	Nottingham Forest	West Bromwich
	Gunn 6' (o.g.); Deehan 81'		46' Mills	Stadium: The Hawthorns; Attendance: 19,269

28 March 1981 36	Nottingham Forest	2–1	Norwich City	West Bridgford
	T.Francis 53'; T.Francis 54'		44' Fashanu	Stadium: City Ground; Attendance: 22,353

4 April 1981 37	Southampton	2–0	Nottingham Forest	Southampton
	Keegan 18'; Channon 39'			Stadium: The Dell; Attendance: 22,712

11 April 1981 38	Nottingham Forest	0–0	Liverpool	West Bridgford
				Stadium: City Ground; Attendance: 27,363

18 April 2021 39	Aston Villa	2–0	Nottingham Forest	Birmingham
	Cowans 29' (pen.); Withe 45'			Stadium: Villa Park; Attendance: 34,707

20 April 1981 40	Nottingham Forest	1–0	Wolverhampton Wanderers	West Bridgford
	Francis 31'			Stadium: City Ground; Attendance: 19,711

25 April 1981 41	Crystal Palace	1–3	Nottingham Forest	Selhurst
	Smillie 65'		32' S.Gray; 44' Wallace; 58' Aas	Stadium: Selhurst Park; Attendance: 12,138

2 May 1981 42	Nottingham Forest	1–1	Coventry City	West Bridgford
	Robertson 43' (pen.)		24' Thompson	Stadium: City Ground; Attendance: 21,511

=== League Cup ===
==== Second round ====
27 August 1980 1	Nottingham Forest	3–0	Peterborough United	Nottingham
	Gray 87'; Birtles 76'; Robertson 47' (pen.)			Stadium: City Ground; Attendance: 16,117

3 September 1980 2	Peterborough United	1–1	Nottingham Forest	Peterborough
	Cooke 33'		28' Mills	Stadium: London Road; Attendance: 11,503

==== Third round ====
23 September 1980	Bury	0–7	Nottingham Forest	Bury
			37' Anderson; 5' Ponte; 88' Ponte; 66' Ponte; 71' Birtles; 89' Birtles; 36' Mills	Stadium: Gigg Lane; Attendance: 8,828

==== Fourth round ====
28 October 1980	Watford	4–1	Nottingham Forest	Watford
	Blissett 41' (pen.); Jenkins 44', 55', 68'		74' Wallace	Stadium: Vicarage Road; Attendance: 22,597

=== FA Cup ===
==== Third round ====
3 January 1981	Nottingham Forest	3–3	Bolton Wanderers	Nottingham
	Ponte 83'; Francis 32'; Francis 68'		40', 54' Hoggan; 69' Whatmore	Stadium: City Ground; Attendance: 22,920

6 January 1981 Replay	Bolton Wanderers	0–1 (a.e.t.)	Nottingham Forest	Nottingham
			113' Francis	Stadium: City Ground; Attendance: 22,799

==== Fourth round ====
24 January 1981	Nottingham Forest	1–0	Manchester United	Nottingham
	Francis 15'			Stadium: City Ground; Attendance: 34,110

==== Fifth round ====
14 February 1981	Nottingham Forest	2–1	Bristol City	Nottingham
	Wallace 88'; Robertson 83' (pen.)		40' Mabbutt	Stadium: City Ground; Attendance: 26,732; Referee: K Walmsley

==== Quarterfinals ====
7 March 1981	Nottingham Forest	3–3	Ipswich Town	Nottingham
	Francis 24'; Walsh 41'; Robertson 51' (pen.)		14' Mariner; 23' (o.g.)Anderson (o.g); 83' Thijssen	Stadium: City Ground; Attendance: 34,796

10 March 1981 Replay	Ipswich Town	1–0	Nottingham Forest	Ipswich
	Mühren 67'			Stadium: Portman Road; Attendance: 31,060

=== European Cup ===
==== Round of 32 ====
17 September 1980 1	CSKA Sofia (Bulgaria)	1–0	(England) Nottingham Forest	Sofia
	Yonchev 70'	Report		Stadium: Natsionalen Stadion Vasil Levski; Attendance: 60,000; Referee: (Italy) Luigi Agnolin

1 October 1980 2	Nottingham Forest (England)	0–1	(Bulgaria) CSKA Sofia	Nottingham
		Report	Kerimov 33'	Stadium: City Ground; Attendance: 25,818; Referee: (West Germany) Walter Horstmann

=== European Super Cup ===
25 November 1980 1	Nottingham Forest (England)	2–1	(Spain) Valencia	Nottingham
	Bowyer 57', 89'	Report	Darío Felman 47'	Stadium: City Ground; Attendance: 12,463; Referee: (Belgium) Alexis Ponnet

17 December 1980 2	Valencia (Spain)	1–0 (2a-2 agg.)	(England) Nottingham Forest	Valencia
	Fernando Morena 51'	Report		Stadium: Estadi Luis Casanova; Attendance: 29,038; Referee: (Austria) Franz Wöhrer

=== Intercontinental Cup ===
11 February 1981	Nacional (Uruguay)	1–0	(England) Nottingham Forest	Tokyo
	Victorino 10'	Report		Stadium: National Stadium; Attendance: 62,000; Referee: (Israel) Abraham Klein

== Statistics ==
=== Players statistics ===
(Note: The statistics for the following players are for their time during 1980–81 season playing for Nottingham Forest. Any stats from a different club during 1979–80 are not included. Includes all competitive matches.)

No.	Pos	Nat	Player	Total		Football League Division One		Football League Cup		FA Cup		European Cup	
No.	Pos	Nat	Player	Apps	Goals	Apps	Goals	Apps	Goals	Apps	Goals	Apps	Goals
	GK	(England) ENG	Shilton	51	0	40	0	3	0	6	0	2	0
	DF	(England) ENG	Anderson	41	1	31	0	3	1	5	0	2	0
	DF	(Scotland) SCO	Burns	39	5	30	5	3	0	5	0	1	0
	DF	(England) ENG	Gunn	32	0	26	0	1	0	5	0		
	DF	(Scotland) SCO	Gray	52	4	40	3	4	1	6	0	2	0
	MF	(England) ENG	Mills	29	7	19+4	5	3	2	1	0	2	0
	MF	(Scotland) SCO	Walsh	19	5	14+1	4	0	0	4	1	0	0
	MF	(Scotland) SCO	McGovern	34	0	27	0	2	0	3	0	2	0
	MF	(Scotland) SCO	Robertson	50	9	38	6	4	1	6	2	2	0
	FW	(England) ENG	Francis	24	11	18	6	0	0	6	5	0	0
	FW	(England) ENG	Wallace	46	13	37	11	2	1	5	1	2	0
	GK	(England) ENG	Sutton	2	0	1	0	1	0	0	0	0	0
	MF	(Northern Ireland) NIR	O'Neill	28	3	18+3	3	3	0	2	0	2	0
	MF	(England) ENG	Bowyer	25	3	17+2	3	3	0	1	0	2	0
	DF	(England) ENG	Lloyd	23	0	17+1	0	2	0	2	0	1	0
	DF	(England) ENG	Needham	23	0	17	0	3	0	1	0	2	0
	MF	(England) ENG	Gray	17	0	13+1	0	0	0	3	0		
	MF	(Switzerland) SUI	Ponte	23	7	11+6	3	3	3	3	1	0	0
	FW	(England) ENG	Ward	15	2	10+4	2	0	0	1	0	0	0
	FW	(England) ENG	Birtles	14	9	9	6	3	3	0	0	2	0
	DF	(Norway) NOR	Einar Aas	6	1	5+1	1						
	GK	(England) ENG	Smelt	1	0	1	0	0	0	0	0	0	0
	FW	(Scotland) SCO	O'Hare	1	0	0	0	1	0				
	DF	(England) ENG	Kendal										

- Source: https://www.11v11.com/teams/nottingham-forest/tab/players/season/1981/
