= 1982–83 Nottingham Forest F.C. season =

English football club season

Nottingham Forest
1982–83 season
- Chairman: Geoffrey McPherson
- Manager: Brian Clough
- Stadium: The City Ground
- Football League First Division: 5th (In 1983-84 UEFA Cup)
- FA Cup: Third round
- Football League Cup: Fifth round
- Top goalscorer: League: Ian Wallace (13); All: Ian Wallace (17)
- Highest home attendance: 25,554 vs Notts County (League)
- Lowest home attendance: 15,037 vs Swansea City (League)
- Average home league attendance: 20,593 (League)
Home colours	Away colours

The 1982–83 season was Nottingham Forest's 118th year in existence and sixth consecutive season in the First Division.

== Summary ==
In his eight season as manager Brian Clough started to rejuvenate the squad after the transfers out of goalkeeper Peter Shilton central defender Dave Needham and Scottish midfielder John McGovern signed with Bolton Wanderers. Arrivals included forward Birtles returning from Manchester United, central defender Colin Todd, Dutch Goalkeeper Hans van Breukelen and Kenny Swain from Aston Villa. In League the squad finished in 5th place, only 2 points less than runners-up Watford F.C., clinching a UEFA Cup spot for the next year. After six seasons, assistant Peter Taylor left the club and was appointed by Derby County as its new manager in November 1982.

== Squad ==
Note: Flags indicate national team as defined under FIFA eligibility rules; some limited exceptions apply. Players may hold more than one non-FIFA nationality.

Pos.	Nation	Player
GK	NED	Hans van Breukelen
GK	ENG	Steve Sutton
GK	SCO	Ronnie Sinclair
DF	ENG	Viv Anderson
DF	SCO	Willie Young
DF	ENG	Stuart Gray
DF	ENG	Bryn Gunn
DF	ENG	Chris Fairclough
DF	ENG	Colin Todd
DF	ENG	Mark Smalley
MF	ENG	Mark Proctor
MF	ENG	Ian Bowyer (c)

Pos.	Nation	Player
MF	ENG	Steve Wigley
MF	ENG	Danny Wilson
MF	SCO	John Robertson
MF	SCO	Colin Walsh
MF	ENG	Steve Hodge
MF	ENG	Steve Kendal
MF	ENG	Kenny Swain
FW	SCO	Ian Wallace
FW	ENG	Peter Davenport
FW	ENG	Garry Birtles
FW	ENG	Liam Robinson

=== Transfers ===
In
Pos.	Name	from	Type
FW	Garry Birtles	Manchester United	
MF	Kenny Swain	Aston Villa	£30,000
DF	Colin Todd	Birmingham City	
GK	Hans van Breukelen	FC Utrecht	£200,000

Out
Pos.	Name	To	Type
GK	Peter Shilton	Southampton	
DF	Dave Needham	Toronto Blizzard	
MF	John McGovern	Bolton Wanderers	
MF	Jürgen Röber	Bayer Leverkusen	
MF	Gary Mills	Seattle Sounders	
MF	Calvin Plummer	Chesterfield	
MF	Neil Redfearn	Bolton Wanderers	
FW	Justin Fashanu	Notts County	£140,000
FW	Peter Ward	Brighton and Hove Albion	loan

==== Winter ====
In
Pos.	Name	from	Type
FW	Liam Robinson		
GK	Ronnie Sinclair		
DF	Mark Smalley		
MF	Steve Wigley		
MF	Danny Wilson		

Out
Pos.	Name	To	Type
MF	Stuart Gray	Bolton Wanderers	loan
DF	Einar Jan Aas	Moss FK	

== Results ==
=== Division One ===
==== League table ====
Pos	Team	Pld	W	D	L	GF	GA	GD	Pts	Qualification or relegation
3	Manchester United	42	19	13	10	56	38	+18	70	Qualification for the Cup Winners' Cup first round (Note: Manchester United qualified for the European Cup Winners' Cup first round as the 1982–83 FA Cup winners.)
4	Tottenham Hotspur	42	20	9	13	65	50	+15	69	Qualification for the UEFA Cup first round
5	Nottingham Forest	42	20	9	13	62	50	+12	69	Qualification for the UEFA Cup first round
6	Aston Villa	42	21	5	16	62	50	+12	68	Qualification for the UEFA Cup first round
7	Everton	42	18	10	14	66	48	+18	64	

Source: World Football
Rules for classification: 1) Points; 2) Goal difference; 3) Goals scored

==== Results by round ====
Round	1	2	3	4	5	6	7	8	9	10	11	12	13	14	15	16	17	18	19	20	21	22	23	24	25	26	27	28	29	30	31	32	33	34	35	36	37	38	39	40	41	42
Ground	A	H	H	A	A	H	A	H	A	H	H	A	H	A	A	H	A	H	A	H	A	H	A	H	A	H	H	A	A	H	A	A	H	H	A	H	A	H	A	H	H	A
Result	W	L	W	L	L	W	L	W	L	D	W	W	W	D	W	W	L	W	W	W	L	D	D	W	L	L	D	D	D	L	L	L	L	W	W	D	W	W	W	W	D	W
Position	6	13	10	11	15	9	13	10	10	13	10	7	5	5	3	3	5	3	3	2	2	3	4	3	4	4	4	4	4	5	5	6	10	7	5	6	5	5	5	3	4	5

Source: https://www.11v11.com/teams/nottingham-forest/tab/matches/season/1982/
A = Away; H = Home; W = Win; D = Draw; L = Loss; = Champions, Qualified to 1983–84 European Cup; = Qualified to 1983–84 UEFA Cup; = Relegated to Division Two

==== Matches ====
- .- Source: https://www.11v11.com/teams/nottingham-forest/tab/matches/season/1983/

28 August 1982 1	West Ham United	1–2	Nottingham Forest	Upton Park
	Ray Stewart 37' (pen.)		Colin Walsh 11'; John Robertson 79' (pen.)	Stadium: Boleyn Ground; Attendance: 24,796; Referee: A Gunn

1 September 1982 2	Nottingham Forest	0–3	Manchester United	West Bridgford
			Ray Wilkins 73'; Norman Whiteside 82'; Bryan Robson 85'	Stadium: City Ground; Attendance: 23,956; Referee: AW Ward

4 September 1982 3	Nottingham Forest	4–0	Brighton and Hove Albion	West Bridgford
	Ian Wallace 13', 60'; John Robertson 40' (pen.); Colin Walsh 75'			Stadium: City Ground; Attendance: 13,709; Referee: C Thomas

7 September 1982 4	Liverpool	4–3	Nottingham Forest	Liverpool
	David Hodgson 11', 20'; Graeme Souness 82'; Ian Rush 89'		15', 41' Steve Hodge; 38' Peter Davenport	Stadium: Anfield; Attendance: 27,145; Referee: MG Peck

11 September 1982 5	Aston Villa	4–1	Nottingham Forest	Birmingham
	Dennis Mortimer 21'; Peter Withe 31', 79'; Gordon Cowans 66' (pen.)		44' (pen.) John Robertson	Stadium: Villa Park; Attendance: 21,224; Referee: R Bridges

18 September 1982 6	Nottingham Forest	2–0	Watford	West Bridgford
	Colin Walsh 28'; Garry Birtles 78'			Stadium: City Ground; Attendance: 16,550; Referee: GM Tyson

25 September 1982 7	Tottenham Hotspur	4–1	Nottingham Forest	Tottenham
	Garth Crooks 30', 32'; Gary Mabbutt 39', 88'		40' Garry Birtles	Stadium: White Hart Lane; Attendance: 30,662; Referee: AR Glasson

2 October 1982 8	Nottingham Forest	1–0	Stoke City	West Bridgford
	Garry Birtles 60'			Stadium: City Ground; Attendance: 17,222; Referee: JC Deakin

9 October 1982 9	West Bromwich Albion	2–1	Nottingham Forest	West Bromwich
	Cyrille Regis 36'; Gary Owen 60'		3' Ian Wallace	Stadium: The Hawthorns; Attendance: 13,657; Referee: RA Banks

16 October 1982 10	Nottingham Forest	1–1	Birmingham City	West Bridgford
	Steve Hodge 53'		39' Kevin Bremner	Stadium: City Ground; Attendance: 14,528; Referee: N Midgley

23 October 1982 11	Nottingham Forest	3–0	Arsenal	West Bridgford
	Mark Proctor 9'; Garry Birtles 82'; Ian Wallace 85'			Stadium: City Ground; Attendance: 17,246; Referee: G Courtney

30 October 1982 12	Luton Town	0–2	Nottingham Forest	Luton
			44' Ian Wallace; 63' Bryn Gunn	Stadium: Kenilworth Stadium; Attendance: 12,648; Referee: MP Scott

6 November 1982 13	Nottingham Forest	2–1	Ipswich Town	West Bridgford
	John Robertson 66' (pen.); Russell Osman 81' (o.g.)		27' Steve McCall	Stadium: City Ground; Attendance: 17,669; Referee: NL Wilson

13 November 1982 14	Southampton	1–1	Nottingham Forest	Southampton
	Steve Moran 58' (pen.)		14' Ian Wallace	Stadium: The Dell; Attendance: 18,178; Referee: BH Daniels

20 November 1982 15	Sunderland	1–0	Nottingham Forest	Sunderland
			Ian Wallace 52'	Stadium: Roker Park; Attendance: 14,716; Referee: K Walmsley

27 November 1982 16	Nottingham Forest	3–0	Manchester City	West Bridgford
	Willie Young 41'; Garry Birtles 47', 70'			Stadium: City Ground; Attendance: 18,845

4 December 1982 17	Notts County	3–2	Nottingham Forest	West Bridgford
	Iain McCulloch 2'; Paul Hooks 37'; Trevor Christie 61'		5' Ian Wallace; 44' Willie Young	Stadium: Meadow Lane; Attendance: 23,552; Referee: D Scott

11 December 1982 18	Nottingham Forest	2–1	Swansea City	West Bridgford
	Colin Walsh 25'; Mark Proctor 58'		77' Robbie M James	Stadium: City Ground; Attendance: 14,585; Referee: KG Salmon

18 December 1982 19	Norwich City F.C.	1–0	Nottingham Forest	Norwich
			1' Steve Hodge	Stadium: Carrow Road; Attendance: 13,334

27 December 1982 20	Nottingham Forest	4–2	Coventry City	West Bridgford
	Willie Young 39'; John Robertson 45' (pen.); Garry Birtles 78'; Mark Proctor 85'		31' Steve Whitton; 42' Jim Melrose	Stadium: City Ground; Attendance: 24,487; Referee: NH Glover

28 December 1982 21	Everton	3–1	Nottingham Forest	Liverpool
	Graeme Sharp 23', 27' (pen.); Steve McMahon 60'		65' Steve Hodge	Stadium: Goodison Park; Attendance: 25,160; Referee: KA Redfern

1 January 1983 22	Nottingham Forest	0–0	Sunderland	West Bridgford
				Stadium: City Ground; Attendance: 20,382; Referee: J Lovatt

3 January 1983 23	Brighton and Hove Albion	1–1	Nottingham Forest	Brighton and Hove
	Michael Robinson 71'		42' Willie Young	Stadium: Goldstone Ground; Attendance: 10,389; Referee: DJ Axcell

15 January 1983 24	Nottingham Forest	1–0	West Ham United	West Bridgford
	Ian Wallace 74'			Stadium: City Ground; Attendance: 17,031; Referee: PA Tyldesley

22 January 1983 25	Manchester United	2–0	Nottingham Forest	Manchester
	Steve Coppell 64' (pen.); Arnold Muhren 69'			Stadium: Old Trafford; Attendance: 38,615; Referee: KS Hackett

5 February 1983 26	Nottingham Forest	1–2	Aston Villa	West Bridgford
	Danny Wilson 34'		32', 60' Peter Withe	Stadium: City Ground; Attendance: 16,352; Referee: DB Allison

19 February 1983 27	Nottingham Forest	0–0	West Bromwich Albion	West Bridgford
				Stadium: City Ground; Attendance: 14,507; Referee: B Hill

26 February 1983 28	Birmingham City	1–1	Nottingham Forest	Birmingham
	Mick Harford 9'		83' Peter Davenport	Stadium: St Andrews; Attendance: 12,987; Referee: WJ Heath

5 March 1983 29	Arsenal	0–0	Nottingham Forest	Islington
				Stadium: Highbury; Attendance: 21,698; Referee: HW King

12 March 1983 30	Nottingham Forest	0–1	Luton Town	West Bridgford
			13' Ricky Hill	Stadium: City Ground; Attendance: 14,387; Referee: NJ Ashley

16 March 1983 31	Stoke City	1–0	Nottingham Forest	Stoke-on-Trent
	Mickey Thomas 65'			Stadium: Victoria Ground; Attendance: 10,880; Referee: Art. Robinson

19 March 1983 32	Ipswich Town	2–0	Nottingham Forest	Ipswich
	Paul Mariner 25', 65'			Stadium: Portman Road; Attendance: 17,530; Referee: Al. Robinson

26 March 1983 33	Nottingham Forest	1–2	Southampton	West Bridgford
	Steve Hodge 33'		David Armstrong 68'; Danny Wallace 82'	Stadium: City Ground; Attendance: 13,461; Referee: TJ Holbrook

2 April 1983 34	Nottingham Forest	2–0	Everton	West Bridgford
	Steve Hodge 1'; Ian Bowyer 15'			Stadium: City Ground; Attendance: 14,815; Referee: DV Reeves

5 April 1983 35	Coventry City	1–2	Nottingham Forest	Coventry
	Steve Whitton 2'		Ian Wallace 56'; John Robertson 89' (pen.)	Stadium: Highfield Road; Attendance: 9,760; Referee: D Shaw

9 April 1983 36	Nottingham Forest	2–2	Tottenham Hotspur	West Bridgford
	Peter Davenport 35'; Ian Bowyer 40'		Alan Brazil 55'; Gary Mabbutt 64'	Stadium: City Ground; Attendance: 18,265; Referee: R Guy

16 April 1983 37	Watford	1–3	Nottingham Forest	Watford
	Luther Blissett 19' (pen.)		Ian Bowyer 47'; Steve Hodge 56'; Peter Davenport 69'	Stadium: Vicarage Road; Attendance: 17,537; Referee: D Letts

23 April 1983 38	Nottingham Forest	2–1	Notts County	West Bridgford
	Kenny Swain 13'; Mark Proctor 21'		1' Aki Lahtinen	Stadium: City Ground; Attendance: 25,554; Referee: AW Grey

30 April 1983 39	Manchester City	1–2	Nottingham Forest	Moss Side
	Graham Baker 72'		10' Ian Wallace; 62' Peter Davenport	Stadium: Maine Road; Attendance: 23,583

2 May 1983 40	Nottingham Forest	1–0	Liverpool	West Bridgford
	Peter Davenport 75'			Stadium: City Ground; Attendance: 25,017; Referee: T Mills

7 May 1983 41	Nottingham Forest	2–2	Norwich City	West Bridgford
	Colin Walsh 35' Ian Bowyer 59'		16', 44' Dave Bennett	Stadium: City Ground; Attendance: 16,308; Referee: AJ Hamil

14 May 1983 42	Swansea City	0–3	Nottingham Forest	Swansea
			Ian Wallace 12', 37'; 64' Viv Anderson	Stadium: Vetch Field; Attendance: 9,226; Referee: JE Martin

=== League Cup ===
==== Second round ====
06 October 1982 2	Nottingham Forest	6–1	West Bromwich Albion	Nottingham
				Stadium: City Ground

27 October 1982 2	West Bromwich Albion	3–1	Nottingham Forest	West Bromwich

==== Third round ====
10 November 1982 3	Nottingham Forest	7–3	Watford	Nottingham
				Stadium: City Ground

==== Fourth round ====
30 November 1982 4	Nottingham Forest	2–0	Brentford	Nottingham
				Stadium: City Ground

==== Fifth round ====
19 January 1983 5	Manchester United	4–0	Nottingham Forest	Manchester
				Stadium: Old Trafford

=== FA Cup ===
8 January 1983 3	Derby County	2–0	Nottingham Forest	Derby
				Stadium: Baseball Ground

== Statistics ==
=== Squad statistics ===
No.	Pos	Nat	Player	Total		Football League Division One		FA Cup		Football League Cup	
No.	Pos	Nat	Player	Apps	Goals	Apps	Goals	Apps	Goals	Apps	Goals
	GK	(Netherlands) NED	Hans van Breukelen	29	0	25	0	0	0	4	0
	DF	(England) ENG	Viv Anderson	26	1	25	1	0	0	1	0
	DF	(Scotland) SCO	Willie Young	38	5	34	4	1	0	3	1
	DF	(England) ENG	Bryn Gunn	39	1	32+1	1	1	0	5	0
	DF	(England) ENG	Kenny Swain	37	1	32	1	1	0	4	0
	MF	(England) ENG	Ian Bowyer	46	5	39+1	4	1	0	4+1	1
	MF	(England) ENG	Steve Hodge	44	9	38+1	8	1	0	4	1
	MF	(Scotland) SCO	Colin Walsh	41	5	32+5	5	1	0	1+2	0
	MF	(Scotland) SCO	John Robertson	40	9	33+1	6	1	0	5	3
	FW	(England) ENG	Garry Birtles	30	11	25	7	1	0	4	4
	FW	(Scotland) SCO	Ian Wallace	47	17	41	13	1	0	5	4
	GK	(England) ENG	Steve Sutton	19	0	17	0	1	0	1	0
	MF	(England) ENG	Mark Proctor	33	6	25+2	4	1	0	5	2
	DF	(England) ENG	Colin Todd	28	0	23	0	0	0	5	0
	FW	(England) ENG	Peter Davenport	20	6	15+3	6	0+1	0	1	0
	DF	(England) ENG	Chris Fairclough	17	0	12+3	0	0	0	2	0
	MF	(England) ENG	Danny Wilson	10	1	9+1	1	0	0	0	0
	MF	(England) ENG	Calvin Plummer	4	0	3	0	0	0	0+1	0
	MF	(England) ENG	Stuart Gray	3	0	2	0	0	0	0+1	0
	MF	(England) ENG	Steve Wigley	5	0	0+4	0	0	0	1	0
	FW	(England) ENG	Peter Ward	2	0	0+2	0	0	0	0	0
	DF	(England) ENG	Mark Smalley	1	0	0+1	0	0	0	0	0
	FW	(England) ENG	Liam Robinson	0	0	0	0	0	0	0	0
	GK	(England) ENG	Ronnie Sinclair	0	0	0	0	0	0	0	0

- Source: https://www.11v11.com/teams/nottingham-forest/tab/players/season/1983/
