= 1981–82 Nottingham Forest F.C. season =

English football club season

Nottingham Forest
1981–82 season
- Chairman: Geoffrey McPherson
- Manager: Brian Clough
- Stadium: The City Ground
- First Division: 12th
- FA Cup: Third round
- League Cup: Fifth round
- Top goalscorer: League: Ian Wallace (9); All: Ian Wallace (12)
- Highest home attendance: 26,327 vs West Ham United (League)
- Lowest home attendance: 15,037 vs Swansea City (League)
- Average home league attendance: 20,593 (League)
Home colours	Away colours

The 1981–82 season was Nottingham Forest's 117th year in existence and fifth consecutive season in the First Division.

== Summary ==
In his eighth season as manager, Brian Clough appointed Alan Hill as new trainer after the departure of Jimmy Gordon in the previous season. Meanwhile forward Trevor Francis was transferred out to Manchester City being replacing by Norwich City striker Justin Fashanu. The team finished in a disappointing 12th spot with a defensive line (4th overall) not being helped by his offensive line in a mediocre season delivered by Fashanu, Wallace and Ward. The club was early eliminated in FA Cup on third round. Meanwhile, the squad reached the League Cup fifth round only to be defeated by Tottenham Hotspur after a 1–0 score.

After six seasons with the club, assistant Peter Taylor announced his appointment as new manager of Derby County. Also, goalkeeper Peter Shilton left the club by the end of the season to be transferred out to Southampton. Central back Dave Needham was transferred out to Canada, and Scottish midfielder John McGovern signed with Bolton Wanderers for the next campaign.

== Squad ==
Note: Flags indicate national team as defined under FIFA eligibility rules; some limited exceptions apply. Players may hold more than one non-FIFA nationality.

Pos.	Nation	Player
GK	ENG	Peter Shilton
GK	ENG	Steve Sutton
DF	ENG	Viv Anderson
DF	SCO	Willie Young
DF	ENG	Bryn Gunn
DF	ENG	Dave Needham
DF	NOR	Einar Jan Aas
DF	SCO	Kenny Burns
DF	ENG	Chris Fairclough
MF	ENG	Stuart Gray
MF	SCO	John McGovern (c)
MF	ENG	Mark Proctor
MF	ENG	Ian Bowyer

Pos.	Nation	Player
MF	SCO	John Robertson
MF	FRG	Jürgen Röber
MF	ENG	Gary Mills
MF	SCO	Colin Walsh
MF	ENG	Calvin Plummer
MF	ENG	Steve Hodge
MF	ENG	Steve Kendal
MF	ENG	Neil Redfearn
FW	ENG	Justin Fashanu
FW	SCO	Ian Wallace
FW	ENG	Peter Ward
FW	ENG	Peter Davenport
FW	ENG	Trevor Francis

=== Transfers ===
In
Pos.	Name	from	Type
FW	Justin Fashanu	Norwich City	£875,000
MF	Mark Proctor	Middlesbrough	£440,000
MF	Jürgen Röber	Bayern München	

Out
Pos.	Name	To	Type
FW	Trevor Francis	Manchester City	£735,000
DF	Frank Gray	Leeds United	£300,000

==== Winter ====
In
Pos.	Name	from	Type
FW	Peter Davenport	Cammell Laird 1907 F.C.	Free
MF	Ian Bowyer	Sunderland	
DF	Willie Young	Arsenal	£50,000 (Note: Transferred in on 12 December 1981)

Out
Pos.	Name	To	Type
DF	Kenny Burns	Leeds United	£400,000
FW	Peter Ward	Seattle Sounders	loan

==== Spring ====
In
Pos.	Name	from	Type

Out
Pos.	Name	To	Type
FW	Justin Fashanu	Southampton	loan

== Results ==
=== Division One ===
==== League table ====
Pos	Team	Pld	W	D	L	GF	GA	GD	Pts	Qualification or relegation
10	Manchester City	42	15	13	14	49	50	−1	58	
11	Aston Villa	42	15	12	15	55	53	+2	57	Qualification for the European Cup first round (Note: Aston Villa qualified for the European Cup first round as the 1981–82 European Cup winners.)
12	Nottingham Forest	42	15	12	15	42	48	−6	57	
13	Brighton & Hove Albion	42	13	13	16	43	52	−9	52	
14	Coventry City	42	13	11	18	56	62	−6	50	

Source: World Football
Rules for classification: 1) Points; 2) Goal difference; 3) Goals scored

==== Position by round ====
Round	1	2	3	4	5	6	7	8	9	10	11	12	13	14	15	16	17	18	19	20	21	22	23	24	25	26	27	28	29	30	31	32	33	34	35	36	37	38	39	40	41	42
Ground	H	A	A	H	A	H	H	A	A	H	A	H	H	H	A	A	H	A	H	H	H	A	A	A	A	H	A	H	H	A	A	H	H	A	A	A	H	A	H	H	H	A
Result	W	D	L	D	W	W	W	L	D	W	D	W	D	L	W	L	L	W	W	L	D	L	L	D	W	D	W	D	D	D	W	L	L	W	L	L	D	L	L	L	W	W
Position	6	1	11	12	6	5	4	6	6	4	5	5	5	7	5	7	8	6	6	7	11	11	11	11	10	10	10	10	10	10	9	10	12	10	10	11	11	12	13	13	12	11

Source: https://www.11v11.com/teams/nottingham-forest/tab/matches/season/1982/
A = Away; H = Home; W = Win; D = Draw; L = Loss; = Champions, Qualified to 1982–83 European Cup; = Qualified to 1982–83 UEFA Cup; = Relegated to Division Two

==== Matches ====
- .- Source: https://www.11v11.com/teams/nottingham-forest/tab/matches/season/1982/

29 August 1981 1	Nottingham Forest	2–1	Southampton	West Bridgford
	Trevor Francis 25', 26'		44' Kevin Keegan	Stadium: City Ground; Attendance: 25,234

31 August 1981 2	Manchester United	0–0	Nottingham Forest	Greater Manchester
				Stadium: Old Trafford; Attendance: 51,496

5 September 1981 3	Birmingham City	4–3	Nottingham Forest	Birmingham
	Kevan Broadhurst 33'; Tony Evans 39'Neil Whatmore 73', 86'		1', 45', 75' Ian Wallace	Stadium: St Andrews; Attendance: 19,035; Referee: EA Read

12 September 1981 4	Nottingham Forest	0–0	West Bromwich Albion	West Bridgford
				Stadium: City Ground; Attendance: 22,618

19 September 1981 5	Stoke City	1–2	Nottingham Forest	Stoke-on-Trent
	Adrian Heath 6'		51' Colin Walsh; 85' Gary Mills	Stadium: Victoria Ground; Attendance: 15,569

23 September 1981 6	Nottingham Forest	2–0	Sunderland	West Bridgford
	Ian Wallace 65'; Mark Proctor 85'			Stadium: City Ground; Attendance: 21,133

26 September 1981 7	Nottingham Forest	2–1	Brighton and Hove Albion	West Bridgford
	Kenny Burns 55'; Ian Wallace 86'		10' Gordon Smith	Stadium: City Ground; Attendance: 19,220; Referee: PA Tyldesley

3 October 1981 8	Tottenham Hotspur	3–0	Nottingham Forest	Tottenham (North London)
	Mark Falco 27', 82'; Micky Hazard 72'			Stadium: White Hart Lane; Attendance: 34,870

10 October 1981 9	Middlesbrough	1–1	Nottingham Forest	Middlesbrough
	Bryn Gunn 54' (o.g.)		71' Justin Fashanu	Stadium: Ayresome Park; Attendance: 15,043; Referee: D Richardson

17 October 1981 10	Nottingham Forest	2–1	Coventry City	West Bridgford
	Ian Wallace 67', 79'		44' Steve Hunt	Stadium: City Ground; Attendance: 21,101; Referee: MJ Heath

24 October 1981 11	Manchester City	0–0	Nottingham Forest	Moss Side
				Stadium: Maine Road; Attendance: 34,881

31 October 1981 12	Nottingham Forest	2–1	Leeds United	West Bridgford
	Peter Ward 22'; John Robertson 53' (pen.)		43'Aidan Butterworth	Stadium: City Ground; Attendance: 25,272

7 November 1981 13	Nottingham Forest	0–0	West Ham United	West Bridgford
				Stadium: City Ground; Attendance: 26,327

21 November 1981 14	Nottingham Forest	1–2	Arsenal	West Bridgford
	Justin Fashanu 43'		62'Alan Sunderland; 79'Brian Talbot	Stadium: City Ground; Attendance: 20,912

25 November 1981 15	Sunderland	2–3	Nottingham Forest	Sunderland
	Rob Hindmarch 62'; Ally McCoist 79'		21'Colin Walsh; 51'Justin Fashanu; 86'Dave Needham	Stadium: Roker Park; Attendance: 17,419

28 November 1981 16	Aston Villa	3–1	Nottingham Forest	Birmingham
	Des Bremner 6', 38'; Peter Withe 76'		51'Colin Walsh	Stadium: Villa Park; Attendance: 26,847

5 December 1981 17	Nottingham Forest	0–2	Liverpool	West Bridgford
			57' Mark Lawrenson; 59' Ray Kennedy	Stadium: City Ground; Attendance: 24,521

12 December 1981 18	Swansea City	1–2	Nottingham Forest	Swansea
	Robbie M James 34'; John Robertson 89' (pen.)		77' Willie Young	Stadium: Vetch Field; Attendance: 17,559

9 January 1982 19	Nottingham Forest	2–1	Birmingham City	West Bridgford
	Peter Ward 61'; Ian Wallace 68'		73' Frank Worthington	Stadium: City Ground; Attendance: 15,906; Referee: RA Banks

23 January 1982 20	Nottingham Forest	0–2	Notts County	Nottingham
			63'Paul Hooks; 74'Trevor Christie	Stadium: City Ground; Attendance: 26,158; Referee: CB White

30 January 1982 21	Nottingham Forest	0–0	Stoke City	West Bridgford
				Stadium: City Ground; Attendance: 16,219

6 February 1982 22	West Bromwich Albion	2–1	Nottingham Forest	West Bromwich
	Martyn Bennett 31'; Kevin Summerfield 66'		47' Peter Ward	Stadium: The Hawthorns; Attendance: 14,975

13 February 1982 23	Southampton	2–0	Nottingham Forest	Southampton
	Kevin Keegan 24'; Mick Channon 55'			Stadium: The Dell; Attendance: 21,350

16 February 1982 24	Wolverhampton Wanderers	0–0	Nottingham Forest	Wolverhampton
				Stadium: Molineux; Attendance: 11,195

20 February 1982 25	Brighton & Hove Albion	0–1	Nottingham Forest	Brighton
			44' Peter Ward	Stadium: Goldstone Ground; Attendance: 17,168

27 February 1982 26	Nottingham Forest	1–1	Middlesbrough	West Bridgford
	Stuart Gray 90'		6' David Hodgson	Stadium: City Ground; Attendance: 16,464; Referee: C Thomas

9 March 1982 27	Coventry City	0–1	Nottingham Forest	Coventry
			12' Jurgen Rober	Stadium: Highfield Road; Attendance: 9,677; Referee: JB Worrall

13 March 1982 28	Nottingham Forest	1–1	Manchester City	West Bridgford
	Peter Ward 82' (pen.)		45' Tommy Caton	Stadium: City Ground; Attendance: 20,929

17 March 1982 29	Nottingham Forest	1–1	Ipswich Town	West Bridgford
	Calvin Plummer 69'		81' (pen.) John Wark	Stadium: City Ground; Attendance: 16,686

20 March 1982 30	Leeds United	1–1	Nottingham Forest	Leeds
	Frank Worthington 26' (pen.)		7' Jurgen Rober	Stadium: Elland Road; Attendance: 18,036

27 March 1982 31	West Ham United	0–1	Nottingham Forest	Upton Park (East London)
			31' Ian Wallace	Stadium: Boleyn Ground; Attendance: 24,633

3 April 1982 32	Nottingham Forest	0–1	Everton	West Bridgford
			74' Steve McMahon	Stadium: City Ground; Attendance: 17,323

10 April 1982 33	Nottingham Forest	0–1	Wolverhampton Wanderers	West Bridgford
			63' Andy M Gray	Stadium: City Ground; Attendance: 15,691

12 April 1982 34	Notts County	1–2	Nottingham Forest	West Bridgford
	Trevor Christie 22'		16' Ian Bowyer; 83'Calvin Plummer	Stadium: Meadow Lane; Attendance: 19,304; Referee: G Courtney

17 April 1982 35	Arsenal	2–0	Nottingham Forest	Islington
	Brian Talbot 38'		64' Graham Rix	Stadium: Highbury; Attendance: 21,986

20 April 1982 36	Everton	2–1	Nottingham Forest	Walton
	Graeme Sharp 46', 87'		69' Jurgen Rober	Stadium: Goodison Park; Attendance: 15,463

24 April 1982 37	Nottingham Forest	1–1	Aston Villa	West Bridgford
	Dave Needham 13'		57' (pen.) Gordon Cowans	Stadium: City Ground; Attendance: 18,213

1 May 1982 38	Liverpool	2–0	Nottingham Forest	Liverpool
	Craig Johnston 55', 69'			Stadium: Anfield; Attendance: 34,321

5 May 1982 39	Nottingham Forest	0–1	Manchester United	West Bridgford
			36' Frank Stapleton	Stadium: City Ground; Attendance: 18,449

8 May 1982 40	Nottingham Forest	0–2	Swansea City	West Bridgford
			2', 85' Robbie M James	Stadium: City Ground; Attendance: 15,037

12 May 1982 41	Nottingham Forest	2–0	Tottenham Hotspur	West Bridgford
	Peter Davenport 39'; Stuart Gray 57'			Stadium: City Ground; Attendance: 15,273

15 May 1982 42	Ipswich Town	1–3	Nottingham Forest	Ipswich
	Alan Brazil 67'		51', 64', 72' Peter Davenport	Stadium: Portman Road; Attendance: 19,974

=== FA Cup ===
2 January 1982 3	Nottingham Forest	1–3	Wrexham	Nottingham
	Mark Proctor 2'		61' Steve Dowman; 69'Mick Vinter; 72'Dixie McNeil	Stadium: City Ground; Attendance: 15,649

=== League Cup ===
6 October 1981 2 (1st leg)	Birmingham City	2–3	Nottingham Forest	Birmingham
	Frank Worthington; Neil Whatmore		14', 16' Ian Wallace; 57'Mark Proctor	Stadium: St Andrews; Attendance: 14,330

28 October 1981 2 (2nd leg)	Nottingham Forest	2–1 (5–3 agg.)	Birmingham City	Nottingham
	Dave Needham 8'; John Robertson 74'		86' Tony Evans	Stadium: City Ground; Attendance: 16,316

11 November 1981 3	Blackburn Rovers	0–1	Nottingham Forest	Blackburn
			23' Justin Fashanu	Stadium: Ewood Park; Attendance: 14,752

2 December 1981 4	Nottingham Forest	2–0	Tranmere Rovers	Nottingham
	Ian Wallace 46'; Jurgen Rober 54'			Stadium: City Ground; Attendance: 12,244

18 January 1982 5	Tottenham Hotspur	1–0	Nottingham Forest	Tottenham
	Ossie Ardiles 59'			Stadium: White Hart Lane; Attendance: 31,192

== Statistics ==
=== Squad statistics ===
No.	Pos	Nat	Player	Total		Football League Division One		FA Cup		Football League Cup	
No.	Pos	Nat	Player	Apps	Goals	Apps	Goals	Apps	Goals	Apps	Goals
	GK	(England) ENG	Peter Shilton	47	0	41	0	1	0	5	0
	DF	(England) ENG	Viv Anderson	44	0	39	0	1	0	4	0
	DF	(Scotland) SCO	Willie Young	26	1	25	1	1	0	0	0
	DF	(Scotland) SCO	John McGovern	34	0	26+4	0	0+1	0	3	0
	DF	(England) ENG	Bryn Gunn	43	0	36+1	0	1	0	5	0
	MF	(England) ENG	Ian Bowyer	24	1	23+1	1	0	0	0	0
	MF	(England) ENG	Mark Proctor	43	3	35+2	1	1	1	5	1
	MF	(England) ENG	Stuart Gray	38	2	32+1	2	0	0	5	0
	MF	(Scotland) SCO	John Robertson	42	3	36	2	1	0	5	1
	FW	(England) ENG	Justin Fashanu	36	4	31+1	3	0	0	4	1
	FW	(Scotland) SCO	Ian Wallace	34	12	28+1	9	1	0	4	3
	GK	(England) ENG	Steve Sutton	1	0	1	0	0	0	0	0
	MF	(West Germany) FRG	Jürgen Röber	25	4	21+1	3	1	0	2	1
	DF	(England) ENG	Dave Needham	21	3	17	2	1	0	3	1
	FW	(England) ENG	Peter Ward	18	5	14+1	5	1	0	2	0
	DF	(Norway) NOR	Einar Jan Aas	17	0	14	0	0	0	3	0
	MF	(England) ENG	Gary Mills	17	1	13+1	1	0	0	1+2	0
	MF	(Scotland) SCO	Colin Walsh	19	3	7+8	3	1	0	2+1	0
	MF	(England) ENG	Calvin Plummer	9	2	7+2	2	0	0	0	0
	DF	(Scotland) SCO	Kenny Burns	8	1	7	1	0	0	1	0
	FW	(England) ENG	Peter Davenport	5	4	5	4	0	0	0	0
	DF	(England) ENG	Chris Fairclough	1	0	0	0	0	0	1	0
	FW	(England) ENG	Trevor Francis	2	2	2	2	0	0	0	0
	MF	(England) ENG	Steve Hodge	1	0	1	0	0	0	0	0
	MF	(England) ENG	Steve Kendal	1	0	1	0	0	0	0	0
	MF	(England) ENG	Neil Redfearn	0	0	0	0	0	0	0	0

- Source: https://www.11v11.com/teams/nottingham-forest/tab/players/season/1982/
