= Bryn Gunn =

English footballer

Personal information
- Full name: Brynley Charles Gunn
- Date of birth: 21 August 1958 (age 68)
- Place of birth: Kettering, England
- Height: 6 ft 2 in (1.88 m)
- Position: Defender

Senior career*
Years	Team	Apps	(Gls)
1975–1986	Nottingham Forest	131	(1)
1978	→ Eastern Suburbs (loan)		
1985	→ Shrewsbury Town (loan)	9	(0)
1986	→ Walsall (loan)	6	(0)
1986	→ Mansfield Town (loan)	5	(0)
1986–1989	Peterborough United	131	(14)
1989–1992	Chesterfield	91	(10)
1992–1996	Arnold Town		
- * Club domestic league appearances and goals

Brynley Charles Gunn (born 21 August 1958) is an English former footballer who played as a full-back for a number of clubs between 1975 and 1996. He is best remembered for his time with Nottingham Forest, with which he won the 1979–80 European Cup, coming on as a substitute in the final. His daughter, Jenny, played cricket for England, and was part of the Ashes-winning team of 2005.

== Career statistics ==
=== Club ===
Appearances and goals by club, season and competition
Club	Season	League			FA Cup		League Cup		Europe		Other (Note: Includes appearances and goals in the FA Charity Shield, Anglo-Scottish Cup, Associate Members' Cup, European Super Cup and Intercontinental Cup.)		Total	
Club	Season	Division	Apps	Goals	Apps	Goals	Apps	Goals	Apps	Goals	Apps	Goals	Apps	Goals
Nottingham Forest	1975–76	Second Division	11	0	0	0	3	0	—		—		14	0
Nottingham Forest	1976–77	Second Division	0	0	0	0	0	0	—		0	0	0	0
Nottingham Forest	1977–78	First Division	0	0	0	0	0	0	—		—		0	0
Nottingham Forest	1978–79	First Division	1	0	0	0	0	0	0	0	0	0	1	0
Nottingham Forest	1979–80	First Division	2	0	0	0	0	0	3	0	0	0	5	0
Nottingham Forest	1980–81	First Division	26	0	5	0	1	0	0	0	1	0	33	0
Nottingham Forest	1981–82	First Division	37	0	1	0	5	0	—		—		43	0
Nottingham Forest	1982–83	First Division	33	1	1	0	5	0	—		—		39	1
Nottingham Forest	1983–84	First Division	4	0	0	0	0	0	3	0	—		7	0
Nottingham Forest	1984–85	First Division	17	0	2	0	3	1	2	0	—		24	1
Nottingham Forest	1985–86	First Division	0	0	0	0	0	0	—		—		0	0
Nottingham Forest	Total		131	1	9	0	17	1	8	0	1	0	166	2
Shrewsbury Town (loan)	1985–86	Second Division	9	0	0	0	0	0	—		—		9	0
Walsall (loan)	1985–86	Third Division	6	0	0	0	0	0	—		2	0	8	0
Mansfield Town (loan)	1985–86	Fourth Division	5	0	0	0	0	0	—		0	0	5	0
Peterborough United	1986–87	Fourth Division	39	7	1	0	4	0	—		2	0	46	7
Peterborough United	1987–88	Fourth Division	46	0	2	0	6	1	—		4	0	58	1
Peterborough United	1988–89	Fourth Division	46	7	4	0	4	1	—		2	0	56	8
Peterborough United	Total		131	14	7	0	14	2	—		8	0	160	16
Chesterfield	1989–90	Fourth Division	46	8	2	1	2	0	—		5	0	55	9
Chesterfield	1990–91	Fourth Division	36	2	2	0	2	0	—		2	0	42	2
Chesterfield	1991–92	Fourth Division	9	0	0	0	2	0	—		1	0	12	0
Chesterfield	Total		91	10	4	1	6	0	—		8	0	109	11
Career total			373	25	20	1	37	3	8	0	19	0	457	29

== Honours ==
Nottingham Forest

- European Cup: 1979–80
