= Martin O'Neill =

Northern Irish football manager and player (born 1952)

Martin O'Neill OBE
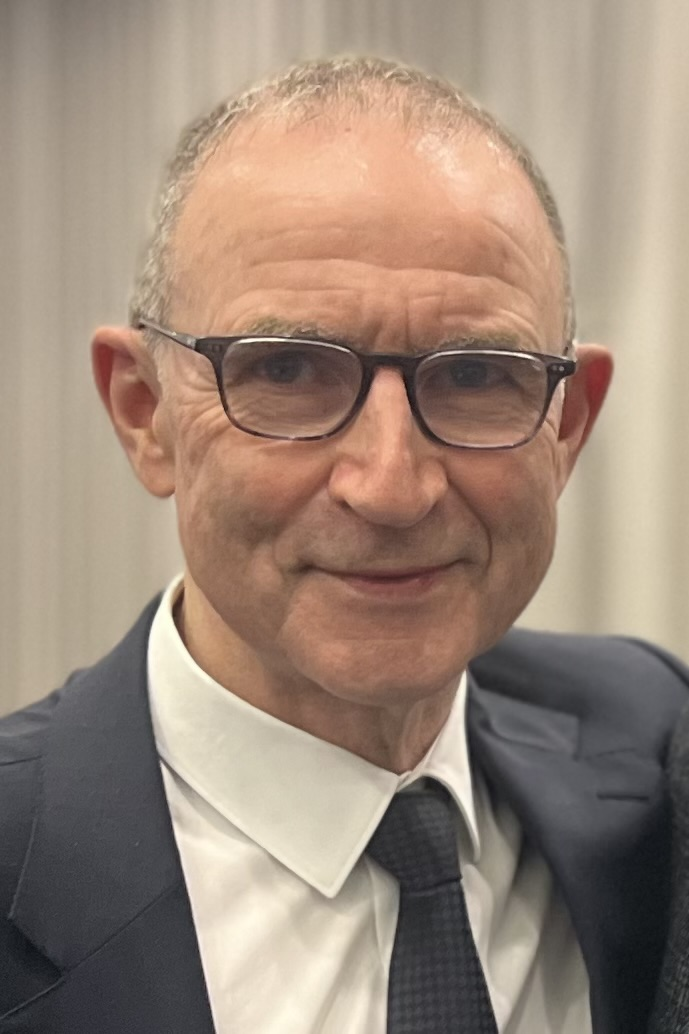
- O'Neill in 2023

Personal information
- Full name: Martin Hugh Michael O'Neill
- Date of birth: 1 March 1952 (age 74)
- Place of birth: Kilrea, County Londonderry, Northern Ireland
- Height: 5 ft 10 in (1.78 m)
- Position: Midfielder

Team information
- Current team: Celtic (manager)

Youth career
- Rosario
- 1969–1971: Derry City

Senior career*
Years	Team	Apps	(Gls)
1971	Distillery		
1971–1981	Nottingham Forest	285	(48)
1981	Norwich City	11	(1)
1981–1982	Manchester City	13	(0)
1982–1983	Norwich City	55	(11)
1983–1984	Notts County	64	(5)
1984	Chesterfield	0	(0)
1985	Fulham	0	(0)
Total		428	(65)

International career
1971	Northern Ireland amateur	1	(0)
1971–1984	Northern Ireland	64	(8)

Managerial career
- 1987–1989: Grantham Town
- 1989: Shepshed Charterhouse
- 1990–1995: Wycombe Wanderers
- 1995: Norwich City
- 1995–2000: Leicester City
- 2000–2005: Celtic
- 2006–2010: Aston Villa
- 2011–2013: Sunderland
- 2013–2018: Republic of Ireland
- 2019: Nottingham Forest
- 2025: Celtic (interim)
- 2026–: Celtic
- * Club domestic league appearances and goals

Martin Hugh Michael O'Neill (born 1 March 1952) is a Northern Irish professional football manager and former player who played as a midfielder. He is the manager of Scottish Premiership club Celtic.

After a brief early career in the Irish League, O'Neill moved to England where he spent most of his playing career with Nottingham Forest. He won the First Division title in 1977–78 and the European Cup twice, in 1979 and 1980. He was capped 64 times for the Northern Ireland national football team, and captained the side at the 1982 World Cup.

At club level, O'Neill has managed Grantham Town, Wycombe Wanderers, Norwich City, Leicester City, Celtic, Aston Villa, Nottingham Forest and Sunderland. He guided Leicester City to the Football League Cup final three times, winning twice. As Celtic manager between 2000 and 2005, he led the club to seven trophies including three Scottish Premier League titles, and reached the 2003 UEFA Cup Final. After joining Aston Villa, he achieved three consecutive sixth-place finishes in the English Premier League, and guided them to the 2010 Football League Cup Final.

He became Republic of Ireland manager in 2013 and led them to qualification for UEFA Euro 2016 where they reached the last 16 of the tournament.

In October 2025, he returned to Celtic as interim manager following Brendan Rodgers' resignation. He departed in December after Wilfried Nancy was appointed as permanent manager. After just 33 days, however, Nancy was dismissed and O'Neill was again appointed as Celtic manager in January 2026. O'Neill ultimately guided Celtic to the Scottish Premiership title on the final day of the season. This was O'Neill's fourth Scottish title win. O'Neill then led Celtic to victory in the 2026 Scottish Cup final, defeating Dunfermline Athletic 3–1 at Hampden Park to complete a domestic double.

== Early life and Gaelic football career ==
Martin Hugh Michael O'Neill was born on 1 March 1952 in Kilrea, County Londonderry, Northern Ireland. He was the sixth child of nine siblings, and has four brothers and four sisters. O'Neill's father was a founding member of local GAA club Pádraig Pearse's Kilrea. His brothers Gerry and Leo played for the club as well as being on the Derry senior team which won the 1958 Ulster Championship and reached that year's final of the All-Ireland SFC. He played for both Kilrea and Derry at underage level as well. He also played Gaelic football while boarding at St Columb's College, Derry, and later at St Malachy's College, Belfast.

While at St Malachy's, he first came to public attention as a football player with local side Rosario and then eventually with Distillery. This breached the Gaelic Athletic Association prohibition on Gaelic footballers playing "foreign sports". When St Malachy's reached the 1970 MacRory Cup final, the Antrim GAA County Board refused to allow the game to go ahead at Belfast's Casement Park. The colleges involved switched the venue to County Tyrone to enable him to play. St Malachy's won the game.

== Club career ==
=== Early career ===
Before playing for Distillery in the Irish League, O'Neill played for the South Belfast side Rosario. While at Distillery, he won the Irish Cup in 1971, scoring twice in a 3–0 win over Derry City in the final. His second goal was particularly impressive, a mazy run in which he dribbled past three opponents before scoring with a powerful shot. As a result of winning the cup, Distillery qualified for Europe the following season. O'Neill scored against Barcelona in the European Cup Winners' Cup in a 3–1 home defeat in September 1971. During this period he was spotted by a scout for Nottingham Forest. He signed for the English club in October 1971, leaving Distillery and quitting his law degree studies at the University of Belfast.

=== Nottingham Forest ===
O'Neill went on to play an integral role in Forest's golden era. He scored on his league debut for the club, a 4–1 win over West Bromwich Albion on 13 November 1971. He went on to make a total of 17 league appearances that season, scoring twice, but could not prevent his side's relegation from the First Division in 1972. However, the appointment of Brian Clough as manager in January 1975 was the beginning of a revolution for Nottingham Forest. Under Clough's management, O'Neill helped Forest gain promotion to the top flight in 1977 and win the league title and League Cup a year later, which was followed by further League Cup success in 1979. That same year, he was dropped to the substitutes' bench for Forest's first European Cup victory over Malmö after failing to fully recover from an injury, but he played in their 1980 win over Hamburg.

=== Later career ===
O'Neill signed for Norwich City in February 1981 for £250,000. However, Norwich were relegated on the last day of the season and he activated a release clause which enabled him to sign for Manchester City. Despite a good start, he soon became out of favour with manager John Bond and returned to Norwich in February 1982, where he scored six goals to help them finish third and secure promotion. After another season at Norwich, he returned to Nottingham to play for Notts County where they had successive relegations. Hoping to get fit for Northern Ireland's 1986 World Cup squad, O'Neill attempted to make a comeback in 1984 with Chesterfield, but only played part of a reserve game before being forced off with a knee injury after 20 minutes. After leaving Chesterfield, Fulham manager Ray Harford invited O'Neill to join the club in a bid to regain his fitness. O'Neill only managed to take part in two reserve games for Fulham (neither of which he completed), before retiring as a result of his cruciate ligament injury in February 1985.

== International career ==
O'Neill first represented his country in an amateur international against Scotland at The Oval in February 1971. Then he made his senior debut in a UEFA Euro 1972 qualifying game against Soviet Union national football team on 13 October 1971. He was then a regular for Northern Ireland, captaining the side at the 1982 World Cup in Spain which reached the second group stage and defeated the host nation in Valencia. He played 64 times and scored eight goals for Northern Ireland between 1971 and 1984. He also won the British Home Championship twice as a player, in 1980 and 1984.

== Managerial career ==
After his playing career, O'Neill worked at an insurance company before beginning a career in football management, initially at Grantham Town in 1987. This was followed by a brief spell at the helm of Shepshed Charterhouse.

=== Wycombe Wanderers ===
He became manager of Wycombe Wanderers in February 1990. In May of that year, he played in the Martin O'Neill XI side, along with George Best, in a friendly match that was to be the last ever match held at Loakes Park. In the 1990–91 season, he took Wycombe to fifth in the Football Conference. In the 1991–92 season, he led Wycombe to second place in the Conference, losing out to Colchester United only on goal difference. The following season, he took Wycombe into the Football League for the very first time. In the 1993–94 season, he guided Wycombe to a second successive promotion via the Division 3 play-offs as a 4–2 win over Preston North End took them up into Division 2. In the 1994–95 season, Wycombe narrowly missed out on the Division 2 play-offs and he left the club on 13 June 1995 to become manager at Norwich City. O'Neill also won the FA Trophy with Wycombe in 1991 and 1993.

Under O'Neill, Wycombe also reached the Conference League Cup final twice, winning the trophy in 1991–92. The team also won three Conference Shield titles and the London Five-a-Sides in 1994 and 1995. Wycombe were also beaten finalists in both the Berks & Bucks Senior Cup and Drinkwise Cup.

=== Norwich City ===
O'Neill became manager of Norwich City in June 1995, and left the club in December, due to differences with club chairman Robert Chase over the potential signing of striker Dean Windass, then in his first stint at Hull City, for £750,000.

=== Leicester City ===
O'Neill joined Leicester City immediately after leaving Norwich City. In his first season, Leicester were promoted from the Football League to the Premier League via the play-offs. They won the Football League Cup under him in 1997, and 2000, as well as reaching the 1999 final of the competition. They finished ninth in the Premier League in 1997, tenth in 1998 and 1999, and eighth in 2000. The two League Cup triumphs saw them qualify for the UEFA Cup in 1997–98 and 2000–01.

In October 1998, he was favourite to take over the manager's job at Leeds United. George Graham, who had just resigned from Leeds, brought his Spurs team to Filbert Street for his first game in charge. The Leicester Mercury organised a protest and printed thousands of "Don't Go Martin" posters, which were held up by fans throughout the game, which Leicester won. Thousands of balloons were also released. O'Neill remained as Leicester manager until his contract expired.

=== Celtic ===
O'Neill left Leicester on 1 June 2000, taking over from the team of John Barnes and Kenny Dalglish to become manager of Celtic, who had finished runners-up to Old Firm rivals Rangers in both of their previous seasons. In the season just gone, they had finished 21 points behind the champions.

O'Neill's first Old Firm game, in late August 2000, ended in a 6–2 victory for Celtic. It was their biggest victory over Rangers since the 1957 Scottish League Cup Final. His second Old Firm game saw a reversal of fortunes, however, as Celtic suffered a 5–1 defeat. In that first season, O'Neill won a domestic treble with Celtic, the first time this had been achieved since 1968–69. He was then touted as a potential successor to Alex Ferguson, who had announced he was to leave Manchester United in 2002. Celtic then retained the league title in 2001–02, the first time since 1982 that Celtic had managed that feat. Celtic also qualified for the Champions League group stage, winning all of their home games but losing all of their away games.

He then guided Celtic to the 2003 UEFA Cup Final in Seville, which Celtic lost 3–2 in extra time to a Porto side managed by José Mourinho. This was Celtic's first European final since 1970 and they beat Blackburn, Celta Vigo, Stuttgart, Liverpool and Boavista on the way to the final. He was named on the five-man shortlist for UEFA Team of the Year in the manager category in 2003 The following season Celtic regained the league title from rivals Rangers and reached the quarter-finals of the UEFA Cup, with their run seeing them knock out Barcelona.

On 25 May 2005, Celtic announced that O'Neill would resign as manager to care for his wife, Geraldine, who had lymphoma. His last competitive game in charge of Celtic was the Scottish Cup final 1–0 victory over Dundee United on 28 May 2005, decided by an eleventh-minute goal by Alan Thompson.

Under O'Neill, Celtic won 213, drew 29 and lost 40 of 282 games played, making him the most successful Celtic manager since Jock Stein. In his five seasons at Celtic Park, O'Neill won three Scottish Premier League titles, three Scottish Cups, and a League Cup. The two league titles he lost were by margins of a goal and a point, respectively. He also oversaw a record seven consecutive victories in Old Firm derbies, and in the 2003–04 season Celtic created a British record of 25 consecutive league victories. His win rate of 75.5% is the highest of any manager in the club's history.

=== Aston Villa ===
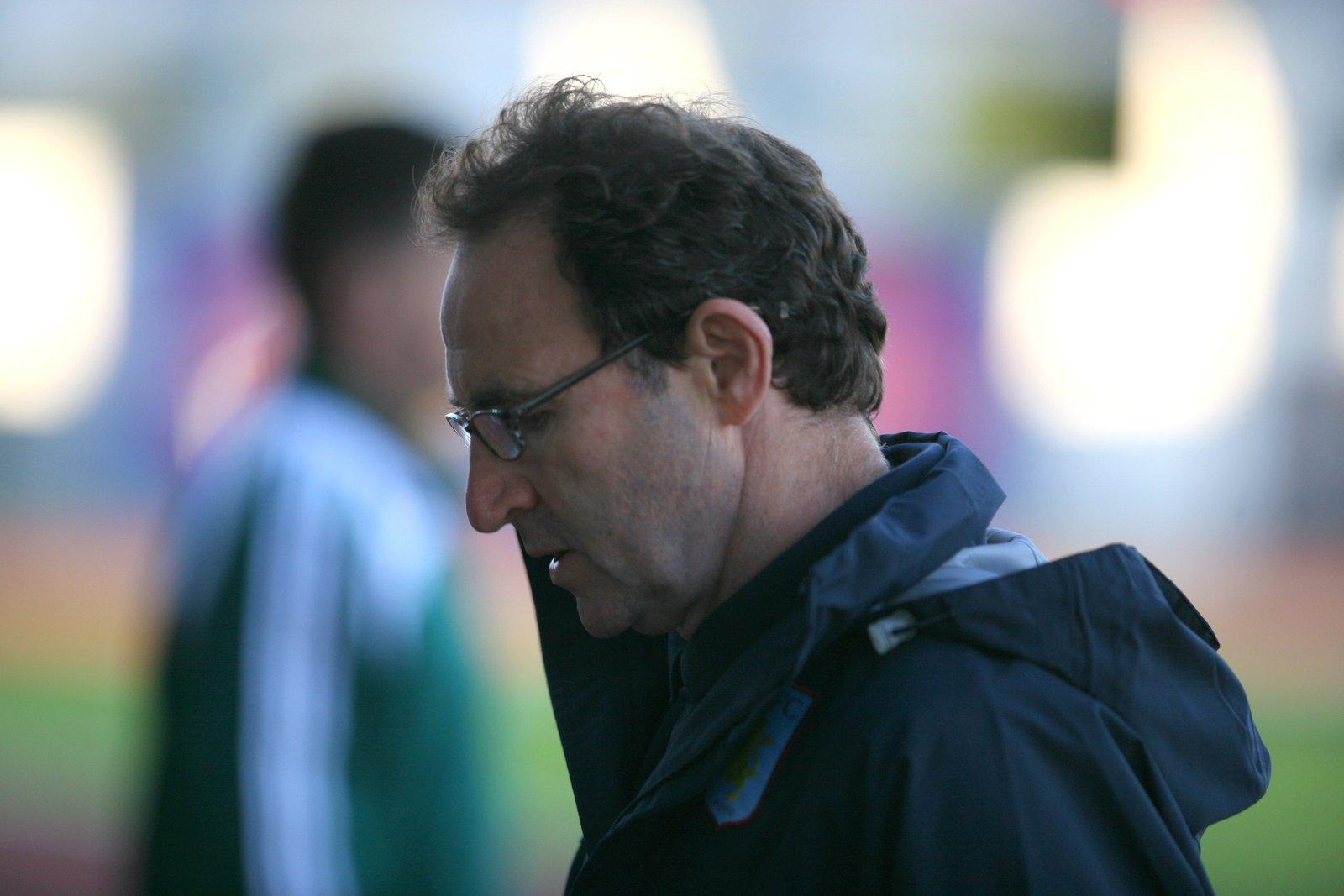
O'Neill with Aston Villa in 2008

O'Neill was introduced as the Aston Villa manager at a press conference on 4 August 2006. At this, he stated: "It's absolutely fantastic to be back and with a club such as this. This is a fantastic challenge. I am well aware of the history of this football club. Trying to restore it to its days of former glory seems a long way away – but why not try? It is nearly 25 years since they won the European Cup but that is the dream."

Villa had the year's longest unbeaten start of any Premier League side in 2006–07, going 9 games without a league defeat until 28 October. Villa suffered a mid-season slump but recovered late in the season, winning their three away games in April to end the season how it began with a run of 9 unbeaten fixtures. For this O'Neill was named the Premier League Manager of the Month for April. Villa's final points tally was 50, an improvement of 8 over the previous season and finished 11th, 5 places higher than the previous season. In October 2007, Aston Villa owner Randy Lerner said that he would not stop O'Neill from leaving Villa if he was offered the vacant post of England manager. O'Neill later dismissed the reports, calling them "unfair speculation".

Aston Villa just missed out on a UEFA Cup spot on the final day of the 2007–08 season and qualified for the Intertoto Cup by finishing sixth. They scored 71 goals, (their second best ever tally in the Premier League and best tally since winning the title in 1981), gained 60 points which was Villa's highest points tally since 1996–97, and were the third highest goalscorers.

After 25 games of the 2008–09 season, having qualified for the UEFA Cup as joint winners of the Intertoto Cup, the club were third in the table on 51 points, two points above Chelsea on level games and seven points above Arsenal in fifth place and on course for a place in the Champions League for the first time since 1983. O'Neill decided to prioritise Champions League qualification above all else, fielding a virtual reserve side for a UEFA Cup game against CSKA Moscow which was subsequently lost. Following this, Villa failed to win any of the next eight league games, and improving form for Arsenal and Chelsea meant that Villa failed to reach the top four.

At the start of the 2009–10 season, Villa failed to qualify for the group stage of the newly named UEFA Europa League, but continued their progress in the league with wins against Manchester United, Chelsea and Liverpool. Arsenal defeated Villa 3–0 at Emirates Stadium, and drew at home. Once again Villa finished sixth for the third consecutive season, and once again improved their points tally finishing with 64 points.

Aston Villa reached their first final under O'Neill, and their first final in ten years on 28 February 2010 against Manchester United in the League Cup, but lost 2–1.

On 9 August 2010, O'Neill resigned as manager of Aston Villa with immediate effect. On his departure, O'Neill said: "I have enjoyed my time at Aston Villa immensely. It's obviously a wrench to be leaving such a magnificent club." O'Neill was reportedly unhappy about the funds available for transfers, but his departure just five days before the start of the new season still came as a shock to the club and its players. Lerner issued a statement two days later, saying he and O'Neill "no longer shared a common view as to how to move forward, but the two remain good friends."

=== Sunderland ===
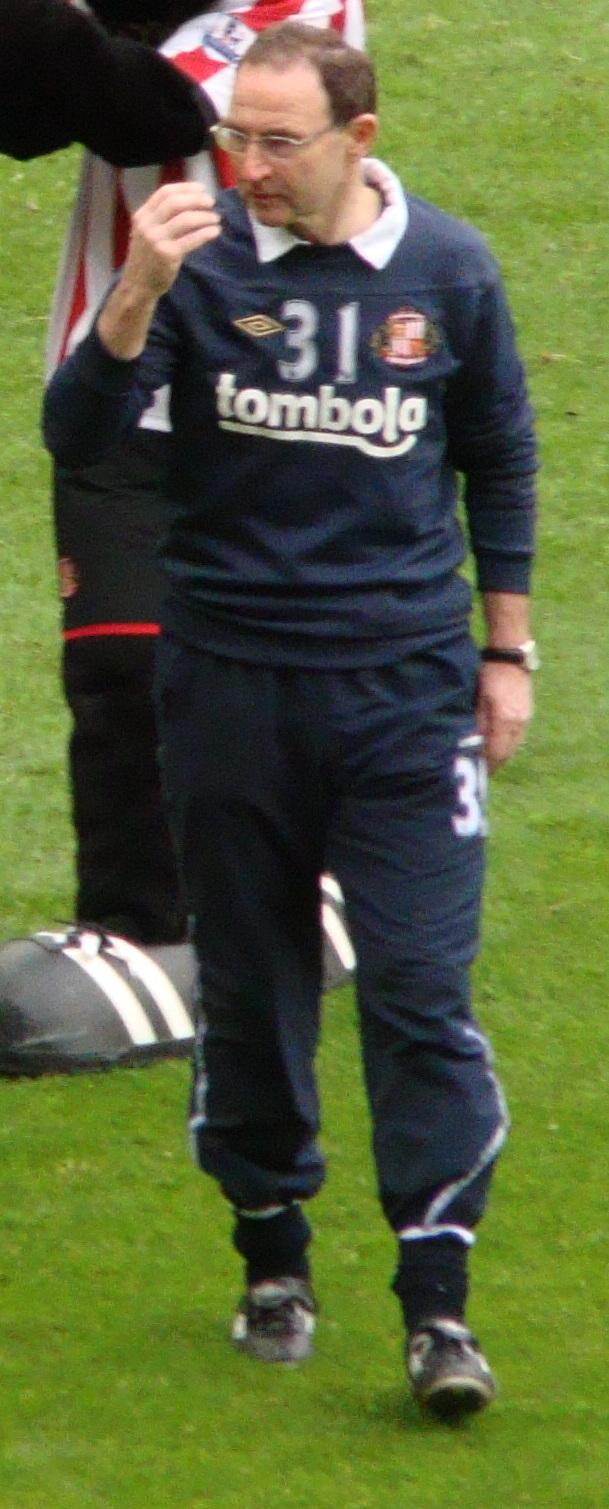
O'Neill with Sunderland in 2012

On 3 December 2011, O'Neill signed a three-year contract with the Premier League club Sunderland, the team he had supported as a boy. In O'Neill's first game in charge, Sunderland came from 1–0 down to beat Blackburn Rovers 2–1 at the Stadium of Light. Under O'Neill, Sunderland began to improve dramatically with four wins from his first six games, including one over league leaders Manchester City. Sunderland continued to perform well in the first few months under O'Neill. They rose to ninth in the league and continued their challenge for a Europa League spot. On 18 February, they beat Arsenal 2–0 to knock them out of the FA Cup fifth round. A week after this, they lost 4–0 to West Bromwich Albion. The next week was O'Neill's first Tyne–Wear derby. The 'fiercely contested' match finished 1–1 with two red cards for Sunderland. The following week, Sunderland defeated Liverpool 1–0 at the Stadium Of Light. Sunderland's form declined towards the end of the season and they finished in 13th place.

The following season, O'Neill had bought Steven Fletcher and Adam Johnson in an attempt to build on his previous 13th place and push on for the top ten. He claimed a solid 0–0 draw at the Emirates against Arsenal in the first game of the season. Sunderland went unbeaten for the first five games before a 3–0 defeat at Manchester City. They then claimed a 1–1 draw in O'Neill's first Tyne-Wear derby at the Stadium of Light after a late Demba Ba own goal. Sunderland then suffered a 0–1 home defeat to Aston Villa and a 1–0 defeat to Middlesbrough in the League Cup. Sunderland slipped into the relegation zone following a 1–3 home defeat to Chelsea. Sunderland's form started to improve over the winter as they climbed the table following an impressive run of results, including another 1–0 success over Manchester City and a 2–3 success over Wigan as they reached a season high of eleventh. However, this proved to be O'Neill's last victory, as Sunderland endured a run of eight games without a win.

O'Neill was dismissed by Sunderland on 30 March 2013 following a 1–0 defeat by Manchester United, which left the team one point above the Premier League relegation zone with seven games left to play in the season. Sunderland had failed to secure victory in the eight matches leading up to O'Neill's departure, winning only three points out of a possible 24 during that spell.

=== Republic of Ireland ===
O'Neill was confirmed as the new Republic of Ireland national football team manager on 5 November 2013. He was joined by former team captain Roy Keane as his assistant manager. His first game in charge on 15 November 2013 against Latvia was a 3–0 win at the Aviva Stadium. On 19 November 2013, O'Neill's first away game as manager saw the team draw 0–0 against Poland at the Stadion Miejski in Poznań. His first loss as manager came on 5 March 2014, a 2–1 scoreline in a home friendly against Serbia.

On 16 November 2015, the Republic of Ireland qualified for UEFA Euro 2016 after defeating Bosnia and Herzegovina 3–1 on aggregate in the play-offs.

On 7 June 2016, O'Neill signed a contract extension until the 2018 FIFA World Cup in Russia. On 22 June 2016, Ireland defeated Italy 1–0 in their final group game of Euro 2016 to qualify for the knock-out stages and round of 16 match against France.

On 9 October 2017, Ireland defeated Wales 1–0 in Cardiff to qualify for the qualification play-offs. In the first leg of the play-offs on 11 November, Ireland drew 0–0 against Denmark in Copenhagen. In the second leg on 14 November in Dublin, Ireland lost 5–1 to Denmark after taking the lead in the game. In January 2018, O'Neill signed a new two-year contract with the FAI after previously verbally agreeing to the contract in October 2017.

On 6 September 2018, an understrength Ireland lost 4–1 to Wales in their opening game in the UEFA Nations League. Ireland went on to finish bottom of their group, picking up just two points in two 0–0 draws against Denmark and were relegated to UEFA Nations League C for the 2020–21 UEFA Nations League (although were later restored to League B following a format change). On 21 November 2018, O'Neill parted company with the FAI by mutual consent, alongside Keane.

=== Nottingham Forest ===
It was announced on 15 January 2019 that O'Neill had become the manager of Nottingham Forest, succeeding Aitor Karanka with the team ninth in the EFL Championship. Having finished the season in the same position in the table, he was dismissed as manager on 28 June 2019, and Sabri Lamouchi was appointed in his place.

=== Return to Celtic ===
On 27 October 2025, O'Neill returned to Celtic as interim manager following the resignation of Brendan Rodgers. In his first match back two days later, Celtic defeated Falkirk 4–0 at Celtic Park.

Celtic remained unbeaten in domestic competition under O’Neill and he guided them to the Scottish League Cup final after a 3–1 semi-final victory over rivals Rangers. On the European front, he led Celtic to a 3–1 away win against Feyenoord in the UEFA Europa League — the club’s first away European victory in over four years and their first win on Dutch soil since a 3–1 triumph over Ajax in 2001, which occurred during O'Neill’s first spell as manager.

O’Neill’s initial tenure at Celtic Park remains the club’s highest managerial win rate at 75.5%, and in his 2025 return he won seven of eight matches and took Celtic level on points with Heart of Midlothian at the top of the table. He departed the club on 3 December 2025, following the appointment of Wilfried Nancy. His final match was a 1–0 win over Dundee at Celtic Park, after which he saluted the fans who had paid tribute to him.

Nancy would ultimately be dismissed after just 33 days at Celtic, having lost six of eight matches in charge. Following Nancy's dismissal, O'Neill again returned to Celtic, being named as manager on 5 January 2026.

He guided Celtic from six points behind in the Scottish Premiership title race to championship success after a 3–1 victory over Heart of Midlothian on the final day of the season. O'Neill subsequently led Celtic to victory in the 2026 Scottish Cup Final, defeating Dunfermline Athletic 3–1 at Hampden Park to complete a domestic double. The achievements marked O'Neill's fourth league title and fourth Scottish Cup as Celtic manager across his two spells at the club. On 11 June 2026, he became the permanent manager, signing a one-year contract with an option to extend it by a further year.

== Outside football ==
Despite never completing his law degree at Queen's University Belfast, O'Neill remains a follower of criminology. His interest began with the James Hanratty case of 1961.

He has worked in television as an analyst for BBC and ITV at the World Cup, the European Championship, and on UEFA Champions League matches.

O'Neill was appointed a Member of the Order of the British Empire (MBE) in the 1983 New Year Honours for services to association football, and promoted to Officer of the same Order (OBE) for services to football in the 2004 New Year Honours. In 2002, Norwich supporters voted him into the club's Hall of Fame.

He was awarded the Nottingham Lifetime Achievement Award on 3 November 2013 for his services to football and achievements with Nottingham Forest.

In November 2022, O'Neill's memoir, On Days Like These: The Incredible Autobiography of a Football Legend, was published.

In June 2024, O'Neill began co-hosting The Football Authorities podcast alongside his friend Clive Tyldesley. The podcast provides an in-depth analysis of football's major stories. The podcast also features a segment where listeners' questions are addressed.

== Personal life ==
O'Neill and his wife Geraldine have two daughters.

In his youth, O'Neill supported Sunderland and Celtic. His favourite player was Sunderland captain and centre-half Charlie Hurley, who won Sunderland's Man of the Century award in 1979.

== Career statistics ==
=== Club ===
Appearances and goals by club, season, and competition
Club	Season	League			National Cup (Note: Includes FA Cup)		League Cup (Note: Includes Football League Cup)		Europe (Note: Includes European Cup)		Other		Total	
Club	Season	Division	Apps	Goals	Apps	Goals	Apps	Goals	Apps	Goals	Apps	Goals	Apps	Goals
Nottingham Forest	1971–72	First Division	17	2	0	0	0	0	—		—		17	2
Nottingham Forest	1972–73	Second Division	35	6	2	0	1	0	—		—		38	6
Nottingham Forest	1973–74	Second Division	27	1	4	0	2	0	—		—		33	1
Nottingham Forest	1974–75	Second Division	16	1	5	0	2	0	—		—		23	1
Nottingham Forest	1975–76	Second Division	30	5	0	0	2	0	—		—		32	5
Nottingham Forest	1976–77	Second Division	40	9	5	0	2	2	—		6 (Note: Appearances in Anglo-Scottish Cup)	0	53	11
Nottingham Forest	1977–78	First Division	40	8	6	2	8	3	—		—		54	13
Nottingham Forest	1978–79	First Division	28	10	3	1	6	1	4	1	1 (Note: Appearance in FA Charity Shield)	2	42	15
Nottingham Forest	1979–80	First Division	28	3	1	0	9	2	7	0	2 (Note: Appearances in European Super Cup)	0	47	5
Nottingham Forest	1980–81	First Division	24	3	2	0	3	0	2	0	2 (Note: One appearance in European Super Cup, one appearance in Intercontinental Cup)	0	33	3
Nottingham Forest	Total		285	48	28	3	35	8	13	1	11	2	372	62
Norwich City	1980–81	First Division	11	1	—		—		—		—		11	1
Manchester City	1981–82	First Division	13	0	0	0	3	0	—		—		16	0
Norwich City	1981–82	Second Division	20	6	1	0	—		—		—		21	6
Norwich City	1982–83	First Division	35	5	3	0	5	1	—		4 (Note: Appearances in Football League Trophy)	1	47	7
Norwich City	Total		55	11	4	0	5	1	—		4	1	68	13
Notts County	1983–84	First Division	38	4	5	0	6	1	—		—		49	5
Notts County	1984–85	Second Division	26	1	2	0	4	1	—		—		32	2
Notts County	Total		64	5	7	0	10	2	—		—		81	7
Career total			428	65	39	3	53	11	13	1	15	3	548	83

=== International ===
Appearances and goals by national team and year
National team	Year	Apps	Goals
Northern Ireland	1971	1	0
Northern Ireland	1972	2	0
Northern Ireland	1973	7	2
Northern Ireland	1974	3	1
Northern Ireland	1975	4	0
Northern Ireland	1976	0	0
Northern Ireland	1977	4	0
Northern Ireland	1978	6	1
Northern Ireland	1979	4	0
Northern Ireland	1980	6	1
Northern Ireland	1981	4	0
Northern Ireland	1982	11	0
Northern Ireland	1983	7	2
Northern Ireland	1984	5	1
Total		64	8

Northern Ireland score listed first, score column indicates score after each O'Neill goal

List of international goals scored by Martin O'Neill
No.	Date	Venue	Cap	Opponent	Score	Result	Competition	Ref.
1	28 March 1973	Highfield Road, Coventry, England	4	Portugal	1–0	1–1	1974 FIFA World Cup qualification	
2	16 May 1973	Hampden Park, Glasgow, Scotland	7	Scotland	1–0	2–1	1972–73 British Home Championship	
3	30 October 1974	Råsunda Stadium, Solna, Sweden	13	Sweden	2–0	2–0	UEFA Euro 1976 qualifying	
4	13 May 1978	Hampden Park, Glasgow, Scotland	22	Scotland	1–0	1–1	1977–78 British Home Championship	
5	15 June 1980	Olympic Park Stadium, Melbourne, Australia	34	Australia	1–1	1–1	Friendly	
6	30 March 1983	Windsor Park, Belfast, Northern Ireland	53	Turkey	1–0	2–1	UEFA Euro 1984 qualifying	
7	21 September 1983	Windsor Park, Belfast, Northern Ireland	57	Austria	3–1	3–1	UEFA Euro 1984 qualifying	
8	12 September 1984	Windsor Park, Belfast, Northern Ireland	63	Romania	3–1	3–2	1986 FIFA World Cup qualification	

== Managerial statistics ==
As of match played 21 November 2026

Managerial record by team and tenure
Team	From	To	Record					Ref.
Team	From	To	P	W	D	L	Win %	Ref.
Wycombe Wanderers	7 February 1990	13 June 1995	290	160	66	64	55.2	
Norwich City	13 June 1995	17 December 1995	27	12	9	6	44.4	
Leicester City	21 December 1995	1 June 2000	222	85	67	70	38.3	
Celtic	1 June 2000	31 May 2005	282	213	29	40	75.5	
Aston Villa	5 August 2006	9 August 2010	190	80	60	50	42.1	
Sunderland	3 December 2011	30 March 2013	66	21	20	25	31.8	
Republic of Ireland	5 November 2013	21 November 2018	55	19	20	16	34.5	
Nottingham Forest	15 January 2019	28 June 2019	19	8	3	8	42.1	
Celtic (interim)	27 October 2025	3 December 2025	8	7	0	1	87.5	
Celtic	5 January 2026	Present	49	34	5	10	69.4	
Total			1,208	639	279	290	52.9	

== Honours ==
=== Player ===
Distillery

- Irish Cup: 1970–71

Nottingham Forest

- Football League First Division: 1977–78
- Football League Second Division promotion: 1976–77
- Football League Cup: 1977–78, 1978–79; runner-up: 1979–80
- FA Charity Shield: 1978
- European Cup: 1978–79, 1979–80
- European Super Cup: 1979
- Anglo-Scottish Cup: 1976–77

Norwich City

- Football League Second Division promotion: 1981–82

Northern Ireland

- British Home Championship: 1979–80, 1983–84

=== Manager ===
Wycombe Wanderers

- Football League Third Division play-offs: 1994
- Football Conference: 1992–93
- FA Trophy: 1990–91, 1992–93
- Conference League Cup: 1991–92; runner-up: 1992–93
- Football Conference Shield: 1991–92, 1992–93, 1993–94
- Berks & Bucks Senior Cup: 1989–90; runner-up: 1990–91

Leicester City

- Football League First Division play-offs: 1996
- Football League Cup: 1996–97, 1999–2000; runner-up: 1998–99

Celtic

- Scottish Premier League: 2000–01, 2001–02, 2003–04
- Scottish Premiership: 2025–26
- Scottish Cup: 2000–01, 2003–04, 2004–05, 2025–26; runner-up: 2001–02
- Scottish League Cup: 2000–01; runner-up: 2002–03
- UEFA Cup runner-up: 2002–03

Aston Villa

- Football League Cup runner-up: 2009–10

=== Individual ===
- Football Conference Manager of the Year: 1992–93
- LMA Football League Third Division Manager of Year: 1993–94
- LMA Football League First Division Manager of Year: 1995–96
- Premier League Manager of the Month: September 1997, October 1998, November 1999, April 2007, November 2007, December 2008, April 2010, December 2011
- Scottish Premier League Manager of the Month: August 2000, December 2000, February 2001, August 2001, April 2002, November 2002, October 2003, November 2003, January 2005
- Scottish Premiership Manager of the Month: November 2025, April 2026
- SFWA Manager of the Year: 2000–01, 2001–02, 2003–04
- Scottish Premier League Manager of the Year: 2003–04
- FAI International Personality: 2004
- Philips Sports Manager of the Year: 2015
- Belfast Telegraph Sports Hall of Fame: 2015 inductee
- Irish Post Outstanding Contribution to the Sports Industry: 2016
- Norwich City Hall of Fame: 2002 Inductee

== See also ==
- List of football managers with the most matches
