= Jim McIntosh (footballer) =

Scottish footballer

Personal information
- Full name: James William McIntosh
- Date of birth: 9 August 1950 (age 76)
- Place of birth: Dundee, Scotland
- Position: Winger

Senior career*
Years	Team	Apps	(Gls)
–	Arbroath Victoria		
1969–1970	Montrose	9	(0)
1970–1976	Nottingham Forest	52	(2)
1976	→ Chesterfield (loan)	3	(0)
1976–1977	Hull City	20	(1)
1977	Dundee United	0	(0)
1977–1979	Montrose	43	(7)
Total		127	(10)
- * Club domestic league appearances and goals

James William McIntosh (born 19 August 1950) is a Scottish former footballer who played as a right winger. He played for Nottingham Forest, Chesterfield (on a short loan) and Hull City in England's Football League, either side of two spells at Montrose in his homeland.

After his playing career ended, he worked at the Timex Group factory in his hometown of Dundee, then operated a Post Office in Girvan, Ayrshire.
