= Lee Smelt =

English footballer

Personal information
- Full name: Lee Adrian Smelt
- Date of birth: 13 March 1958 (age 68)
- Place of birth: Edmonton, England
- Position: Goalkeeper

Youth career
- 1975–1976: Colchester United

Senior career*
Years	Team	Apps	(Gls)
1976	Margate		
1976–1980	Gravesend & Northfleet		
1980–1981	Nottingham Forest	1	(0)
1981	→ Peterborough United (loan)	5	(0)
1981–1984	Halifax Town	119	(0)
1984–1986	Cardiff City	37	(0)
1985	→ Exeter City(loan)	13	(0)
1986	Maidstone United		
1987	Welling United		
1987–1988	Thanet United		
1988–1991	Hythe Town		

Managerial career
- 1989–1991: Hythe Town player-assistant manager
- 1991–1992: Margate
- * Club domestic league appearances and goals

Lee Adrian Smelt (born 13 March 1958) is an English former footballer and author of a goalkeeping coaching book (Practice Keeping: An elite goalkeeper development plan for under 9 to under 21s). A goalkeeper, he played professionally for Nottingham Forest, Peterborough United, Halifax Town, Cardiff City and Exeter City, making a total of 175 appearances in the Football League between 1980 and 1986.

After Cardiff, Lee then went to non-league Maidstone United and from there played at Welling United, Thanet United and Hythe Town. Lee was player-assistant manager in latter part of his time at Hythe Town and returned to former club Margate as Manager in 1991.

He left football in 1992 to join the police. He was as of 2018, the Academy Goalkeeping Coach (U9-23) at Charlton Athletic.

His son Jack was a goalkeeper and for a short period in his career followed in his fathers footsteps as a 'keeper for Margate.
