= Bert Bowery =

Kittitian footballer

Personal information
- Full name: Bertram Nathanial Bowery
- Date of birth: 29 October 1954 (age 71)
- Place of birth: Saint Kitts and Nevis
- Position: Striker

Senior career*
Years	Team	Apps	(Gls)
1973–1974	Ilkeston Town	37	(9)
1974–1975	Worksop Town		
1975–1976	Nottingham Forest	2	(2)
1976	→ Lincoln City (loan)	4	(1)
1976	Boston Minutemen	24	(11)
1977	Team Hawaii	10	(1)
- Long Eaton United
- Arnold
Total		77	(24)
- * Club domestic league appearances and goals

Bertram Nathanial Bowery (born 29 October 1954) is a Kittitian former professional footballer who played in England and the United States as a striker.

== Early and personal life ==
Bowery was born in Saint Kitts and Nevis, and grew up in England. His son Jordan is also a professional footballer.

== Career ==
Bowery began his career in non-league football with Ilkeston Town and Worksop Town, before starting a professional career with Nottingham Forest where he became the first signing of Brian Clough, agreeing a two-and-a-half-year contract for a fee of £2,000. He played for Forest between 1975 and 1976, and made two league appearances, scoring two goals. While at Forest, he spent a loan spell with Lincoln City in 1976, where he made four league appearances and scored one goal. Bowery later played in the NASL for the Boston Minutemen and Team Hawaii, before returning to England to play non-league football with Long Eaton United and Arnold.
