= Dave Sunley =

English footballer (born 6 February 1952)

Personal information
- Full name: David Sunley
- Date of birth: 6 February 1952
- Place of birth: Skelton, Yorkshire, England
- Height: 5 ft 9 in (1.75 m)
- Position: Forward

Youth career
- –: Sheffield Wednesday

Senior career*
Years	Team	Apps	(Gls)
1970–1976	Sheffield Wednesday	130	(21)
1975	→ Nottingham Forest (loan)	1	(0)
1976–1978	Hull City	69	(11)
1978–1980	Lincoln City	41	(6)
1980–1982	Stockport County	83	(6)
1982–19??	Stafford Rangers		
Total		324	(45)
- * Club domestic league appearances and goals

David Sunley (born 6 February 1952) is an English former footballer who scored 44 goals in 324 appearances in the Football League playing for Sheffield Wednesday, Nottingham Forest, Hull City, Lincoln City and Stockport County. He played as a forward. He also played non-league football for Stafford Rangers.

In 1973, he was a member of the Football Association's touring party under the management of Sir Alf Ramsey that visited Gibraltar.
