= Terry Curran =

English footballer and manager

Personal information
- Full name: Edward Curran
- Date of birth: 20 March 1955 (age 71)
- Place of birth: Kinsley, near Hemsworth, England
- Height: 5 ft 8 in (1.73 m)
- Position: Winger

Team information
- Current team: Doncaster City (manager)

Youth career
- Kinsley Boys
- Doncaster Rovers

Senior career*
| Years | Team | Apps | (Gls) |
| 1973–1975 | Doncaster Rovers | 68 | (11) |
| 1975–1977 | Nottingham Forest | 48 | (12) |
| 1977 | → Bury (loan) | 2 | (0) |
| 1977–1978 | Derby County | 26 | (2) |
| 1978–1979 | Southampton | 26 | (0) |
| 1979–1982 | Sheffield Wednesday | 138 | (39) |
| 1980 | → Åtvidaberg (loan) | 9 | (1) |
| 1982–1983 | Sheffield United | 33 | (3) |
| 1982–1983 | → Everton (loan) | 7 | (1) |
| 1983–1985 | Everton | 16 | (0) |
| 1985–1986 | Huddersfield Town | 34 | (7) |
| 1986 | Panionios | | |
| 1986 | Hull City | 4 | (0) |
| 1986 | Sunderland | 9 | (1) |
| | Grantham Town | 2 | (0) |
| 1987 | Grimsby Town | 12 | (0) |
| 1987 | Chesterfield | 1 | (0) |
| Total | | 435 | (77) |

Managerial career
- 1989–1992: Goole Town
- 1992: Mossley
- 2022–: Doncaster City
- * Club domestic league appearances and goals

Edward (Terry) Curran (born 20 March 1955) is an English former professional footballer whose career lasted from 1975 to 1988. Curran was an attacking midfielder who could also play as a winger, and as an out-and-out striker. During his 13-year career, Curran played for many clubs, although he is known by Sheffield Wednesday supporters for his part in launching the club's revival during the late 1970s and early 1980s. Curran is currently Doncaster City's manager.

== Football career ==
Terry Curran was born in Kinsley, near Hemsworth, West Riding of Yorkshire, on 20 March 1955. He signed for the Fourth Division Doncaster Rovers in July 1973 from non-league football. He made 68 appearances for Rovers, scoring 11 goals in two seasons. Brian Clough was wanting to sign him but was put off by the asking price of £140,000, so he controversially told Curran's brother of his interest so Curran would not sign a new contract, thus reducing the transfer fee. He signed for Nottingham Forest in August 1975, with Rovers receiving £50,000 plus keeper Dennis Peacock and winger Ian Miller. In two seasons, he played 48 games, scoring 12 goals for Forest, helping them gain promotion to Division One in the 1976–77 season. Curran lost favour after a disagreement with Forest assistant manager Peter Taylor, and he made a written transfer request in August 1977, which was accepted. He was loaned out to Bury in October 1977 and eventually switched to Derby County in a £50,000 move the following month.

Curran stayed less than a year at Derby, making 26 appearances in Division One and scoring two goals before switching for £60,000 to another First Division club, Southampton, in the summer of 1978. Curran stayed less than a year at Southampton, making 26 appearances in the 1978–79 season and playing in the League Cup semi-final victory over Leeds United. Jack Charlton, the manager of Sheffield Wednesday, approached Curran after that semi-final in January 1979, proposing an audacious request for Curran to drop down two divisions and sign for Third Division Sheffield Wednesday. In March 1979, Curran agreed to Charlton's approach and signed for Wednesday for £100,000. Curran started the 1979 League Cup Final defeat to his former club, Nottingham Forest.

He was on Jack Charlton's side, which went on to gain promotion from Division Three in the 1979–80 season. During his time at Hillsborough, he scored 24 goals in that promotion season. He recorded a song called "Singing the Blues". Curran was involved in an incident the following season in a match at Oldham on 6 September 1980 when he was sent off after a fracas with Simon Stainrod caused Wednesday fans to riot, which led to the closure of Hillsborough terraces for the next four home games.

Curran stayed with Wednesday till the end of the 1981–82 season; he never repeated the scoring exploits of that first season and the team had a new goal ace in Gary Bannister. This and a deteriorating relationship with Jack Charlton led him to leave and sign for Sheffield United for £100,000. He made 33 appearances for United, scoring three goals before moving to Everton for three years (having spent some time on loan there the previous season), during which he made only 24 appearances. He was at the club when they won the First Division in the 1984–85 season, to which Curran contributed nine appearances. He then played briefly at Huddersfield Town before going abroad to play for Greek club Panionios. He returned in October 1986 to play short spells for Hull City, Sunderland, Grantham Town, Grimsby Town and Chesterfield before retiring from playing in 1988.

== Coaching career ==
Since retiring, Curran has managed non-league teams Goole Town and Mossley. After leaving Mossley in December 1992, he managed and invested in a hotel in West Yorkshire.

In October 2012, his autobiography, "Regrets of a Football Maverick", was published.

In 2022, upon the club's formation, Curran was appointed manager of Doncaster City.

== Honours ==
Southampton

- Football League Cup runner-up: 1978–79
