= Liam O'Kane =

Northern Irish footballer

Personal information
- Full name: William James O'Kane
- Date of birth: 17 June 1948 (age 78)
- Height: 1.78 m (5 ft 10 in)
- Position: Defender

Senior career*
Years	Team	Apps	(Gls)
–1968	Derry City		
1968–1976	Nottingham Forest	186	(0)

International career
	Northern Ireland	20	(1)
- * Club domestic league appearances and goals

William James O'Kane (born 17 June 1948), better known as Liam O'Kane, is a Northern Irish former footballer. He played as a defender.

== Club career ==
O'Kane was born in Derry, and began his career with Derry City. He signed for Nottingham Forest in November 1968 and made his League debut on 30 April 1969 against Leeds United. Initially, he succeeded Terry Hennessey at centre-back, but in 1971 he moved to right-back and stayed there for the rest of his career. His best period was 1973–76, on his return from a broken leg, but his career was plagued by injuries, which prematurely ended his playing career in the 1975–76 season, when he was still only 28.

He scored his only goal for Forest in the 1973–74 FA Cup quarter-Final against Newcastle United, but as the game (which Forest lost 4–3 after comfortably leading 3–1 in the second half) was ordered to be replayed due to the United fans invading the pitch, the match, and O'Kane's goal, was stricken from the records.

== International career ==
During his career, and despite being troubled persistently by injuries, O'Kane made 20 international appearances for Northern Ireland. He scored one goal against Portugal in 1973.

== Coaching ==
O'Kane moved onto the coaching staff at Nottingham Forest after his playing days and was the only man to have survived throughout the Brian Clough years until Joe Kinnear arrived at the club. O'Kane finally left his position at the club in early 2005 after a 36-year spell.
