= Peter Wells (footballer) =

English footballer

Personal information
- Full name: Peter Arthur Wells
- Date of birth: 13 August 1956 (age 70)
- Place of birth: Nottingham, England
- Height: 6 ft 1 in (1.85 m)
- Position: Goalkeeper

Youth career
- 1971–1974: Nottingham Forest

Senior career*
Years	Team	Apps	(Gls)
1974–1976	Nottingham Forest	27	(0)
1976–1983	Southampton	141	(0)
1983–1985	Millwall	33	(0)
1985–1989	Orient	148	(0)
1989–19??	Fisher Athletic		
- * Club domestic league appearances and goals

Peter Arthur Wells (born 13 August 1956) is an English former footballer who played as a goalkeeper for Nottingham Forest, Southampton, Millwall and Orient in the 1970s and 1980s.
