= Peter Ward (footballer, born 1955) =

English footballer (born 1955)

Personal information
- Date of birth: 27 July 1955 (age 71)
- Place of birth: Lichfield, Staffordshire, England
- Position: Striker

Senior career*
Years	Team	Apps	(Gls)
1974–1975	Burton Albion	50	(21)
1975–1980	Brighton & Hove Albion	178	(79)
1980–1983	Nottingham Forest	33	(7)
1982	→ Seattle Sounders (loan)	32	(18)
1982	→ Brighton & Hove Albion	16	(2)
1983	→ Seattle Sounders (loan)	30	(13)
1984	Vancouver Whitecaps	24	(16)
1984–1987	Cleveland Force (indoor)	133	(89)
1987–1989	Tacoma Stars (indoor)	101	(80)
1989	Tampa Bay Rowdies	8	(4)
1989–1990	Wichita Wings (indoor)	18	(5)
1990	Baltimore Blast (indoor)	22	(12)
1991	Tampa Bay Rowdies	14	(2)
1996–1997	Tampa Bay Terror (indoor)	23	(13)
Total		682	(361)

International career
1977–1980	England U21	2	(3)
1980	England	1	(0)
1980	England B	1	(0)
- * Club domestic league appearances and goals

Peter Ward (born 27 July 1955) is an English retired footballer, whose most successful times were with Brighton & Hove Albion, mostly as a forward. He now lives in the United States.

== Early life ==
Ward was born at St. Michael's Hospital in Lichfield, Staffordshire. He was the first child born to his parents, Colin and Mavis Ward, who met as members of the Derby Serenaders marching band. The band remained a major part of Ward's family life, with Colin encouraging Ward to take up playing the drums as well. Along with music, he was attracted to football from an early age; his father would later state that he "kicked a ball around as soon as he could walk."

== Club career ==
=== Early career and Brighton ===
Ward was an apprentice engine fitter at the Rolls-Royce plant in Derby. While there he played for non-league side Burton Albion making 50 appearances and scoring 21 goals. He was transferred to Brighton & Hove Albion F.C. in 1975 for a fee of £4000 (almost $5,500). The move also saw Burton manager Ken Gutteridge move to the Albion as Assistant Manager. Initially, Ward played in the Brighton Reserves. His first game with the first team came on 27 March 1976 against Hereford United. He scored in the first minute in a game that ended 1–1.

During the 1976–77 season, he scored 36 goals, beating the club record and winning him the golden boot. He is still revered by Brighton fans who sing a song dreaming of a team in which every player is Peter Ward: 'We all live in a Wardy Wonderland.' After finishing second in Division Two in 1978–79, Brighton were promoted to the old Football League First Division. Ward put in a transfer request; however, differences were resolved and he still wore the Brighton shirt for the first game in the top flight which saw Brighton lose 4–0 to Arsenal. In November of that year Brighton accepted a £400,000 offer from Nottingham Forest, but Forest manager Brian Clough changed his mind and withdrew it.

=== Nottingham Forest ===
Ward finally did move to Nottingham Forest in October 1980 in a three-way deal which saw Garry Birtles leave Forest for Manchester United and Andy Ritchie move south from United to Brighton. He made 28 league appearances for Nottingham Forest and scored seven goals, but things did not work out. Ward was sent on loan to American side Seattle Sounders where he scored 18 goals in the 1981–82 season putting him third in the list of top NASL goalscorers that season.

=== Back at Brighton ===
Ward returned to Brighton on loan in October 1982. The loan lasted four months, during which time he scored three goals, including the only goal in a 1–0 victory over Manchester United. Nottingham Forest refused to extend the loan deal further.

=== North America ===
In September 1983, Ward signed with the Vancouver Whitecaps of the North American Soccer League. He played the 1983–1984 NASL indoor and 1984 outdoor season in Vancouver. On 17 October 1984, the Whitecaps sold Ward's contract to the Cleveland Force of the Major Indoor Soccer League. He spent three seasons with the Force. On 26 June 1987, the Force sent Ward to the Tacoma Stars in exchange for Glen Lurie and the Stars' 1988 and 1989 first-round and 1990 third-round draft picks.

Ward became a free agent at the end of the 1988–1989 season and the Stars did not offer him a contract. He used the summer outdoor season to play for the Tampa Bay Rowdies of the American Soccer League. On 6 September 1989, he signed with the Wichita Wings of the MISL. On 22 January 1990, the Wings sent Ward and Mike Stankovic to the Baltimore Blast for David Byrne and Keder. In 1991, he again played for the Tampa Bay Rowdies, now playing in the American Professional Soccer League.

== International career ==
In 1977, Ward had been selected for an England under-21 game against Norway. He scored a hat trick in a 6–0 win for England. He was selected for the full England squad against Luxembourg a month later but did not make it onto the pitch. His only full cap came on 31 May 1980, in a 2–1 win over Australia. Ward came on in the 85th minute, making his international career the shortest ever for an England player. His record of 6 minutes has since been surpassed by Martin Kelly.

== Personal life ==
In 2002, Ward married his second wife, Jacqueline. He has three daughters from his first marriage. From 2002 to 2005, Ward coached soccer at Tampa Catholic High School located in Tampa, Florida. In 2011, he began coaching for Celtic FC Florida in Largo, Florida. Ward scored both goals for the Yellow Team en route to a 2–0 win during FC Tampa Bay's 2011 Celebrity Halftime Game.
