= 1977–78 Nottingham Forest F.C. season =

English football club season

Nottingham Forest F.C.
1977–78 season
- Chairman: S.M. Dryden, J.P.
- Manager: Brian Clough
- First Division: 1st (In 1978–79 European Cup)
- FA Cup: 6th Round
- League Cup: Winners
- Top goalscorer: League: Robertson; Withe (12); All: Withe; Woodcock (19)
- Highest home attendance: 47,218 vs. Liverpool (Division One, 26 December 1977)
- Lowest home attendance: 18,224 vs West Ham United (League Cup, 30 August 1977)
- Average home league attendance: 32,501
| Home colours | Away colours |

The 1977–78 season was Nottingham Forest's first year back in the First Division since their relegation in 1972. They had finished third in the Second Division the previous season to earn promotion.

== Summary ==
Forest's credentials at the start of the season did not appear to be especially impressive. Promotion from Division Two in 1976–77 had been achieved only by the skin of their teeth and the squad of players was a mixture of underachievers, journeymen and inexperienced youngsters. Many pundits tipped them to struggle. However, Brian Clough and Peter Taylor had already proved at Derby County that they were capable of blending a winning formula from apparently limited resources and they would now do so again. No player epitomised Forest's success more than Kenny Burns, who arrived for £150,000 in pre-season from Birmingham City where he had acquired something of a 'wild man' reputation. Having spent several years playing as a forward, Burns was converted back to the defensive role where he had begun his career and although it took a few matches for him to settle he ended the season by being voted Footballer of the Year.

Forest confounded the critics from the outset, registering three straight league wins to top the first table of the season and thrashing West Ham United 5–0 in the second round of the League Cup. Although their 100% record ended with a 3–0 defeat at Arsenal, Forest won the next three and ended September second in the table behind Manchester City on goal difference. A 4–0 win over Ipswich Town at the beginning of October (Peter Withe scoring all four) restored them to the top of the table and there they stayed for the rest of the season. After a slight hiccup in November saw them lose consecutive away matches at Chelsea and Leeds United they went unbeaten in their remaining 26 league fixtures and were confirmed as champions following a goalless draw at Coventry City in April.

Two further additions had been made to the playing squad in the early weeks of the season. Peter Shilton was signed from Stoke City for £325,000, then a record transfer fee for a goalkeeper, and Archie Gemmill joined from Derby in a deal that also saw Shilton's predecessor John Middleton move in the opposite direction. Middleton had conceded six goals in Forest's opening five league matches - Shilton would concede only 18 in the remaining 37. In December, Forest bought David Needham from Queens Park Rangers for £140,000 to add depth to the defence. Nevertheless, they used just 17 players during the season, one of whom (teenage reserve goalkeeper Chris Woods) only appeared in the League Cup as cover for the cup-tied Shilton.

Forest's League Cup run saw them score 23 goals in just six matches en route to facing Liverpool in the final at Wembley where Woods performed heroics to keep the reigning league and European champions at bay and earn Forest a goalless draw. Liverpool also had the better of the replay at Old Trafford but a controversial penalty converted by John Robertson was enough to give Forest their first piece of major silverware since the FA Cup in 1959. A clean sweep of domestic trophies looked a distinct possibility until defeat at West Bromwich Albion in the FA Cup quarter-final.

The squad became one of the few teams (and the most recent team to date) to win the First Division title the season after winning promotion from the Second Division. The others were Liverpool in 1906, Everton in 1932, Tottenham Hotspur in 1951 and Ipswich Town in 1962. Forest remain the only club to achieve this feat having not been promoted as champions.

== Squad ==
Note: Flags indicate national team as defined under FIFA eligibility rules; some limited exceptions apply. Players may hold more than one non-FIFA nationality.

| Pos. | Nation | Player |
|---|---|---|
| GK | ENG | Peter Shilton |
| GK | ENG | John Middleton |
| GK | ENG | Chris Woods |
| DF | ENG | Viv Anderson |
| DF | SCO | Kenny Burns |
| DF | ENG | Larry Lloyd |
| DF | ENG | Colin Barrett |
| DF | ENG | Bryn Gunn |
| DF | ENG | David Needham |
| DF | ENG | Frank Clark |

| Pos. | Nation | Player |
|---|---|---|
| MF | NIR | Martin O'Neill |
| MF | SCO | Archie Gemmill |
| MF | SCO | John McGovern |
| MF | SCO | John Robertson |
| MF | ENG | Steve Burke |
| FW | ENG | Peter Withe |
| FW | ENG | Tony Woodcock |
| MF | ENG | Ian Bowyer |
| FW | SCO | John O'Hare |
| FW | ENG | Garry Birtles |
| FW | ENG | Steve Elliott |

=== Transfers ===
In
| Pos. | Name | from | Type |
|---|---|---|---|
| GK | Peter Shilton | Stoke City | £325,000 |
| DF | Kenny Burns | Birmingham City | £150,000 |
| MF | Archie Gemmill | Derby County | £25,000 & P/E |

Out
| Pos. | Name | To | Type |
|---|---|---|---|
| DF | Sammy Chapman | Notts County | £7,500 |
| FW | Barry Butlin | Peterborough United | £20,000 |
| MF | Sean Haslegrave | Preston North End | £25,000 |
| GK | John Middleton | Derby County | |

==== Winter ====
In
| Pos. | Name | from | Type |
|---|---|---|---|
| DF | David Needham | Queens Park Rangers | £140,000 |

Out
| Pos. | Name | To | Type |
|---|---|---|---|
| MF | Terry Curran | Derby County | £50,000 |

== Competitions ==
=== First Division ===
==== League Table ====
| Pos | Team | Pld | W | D | L | GF | GA | GD | Pts | Qualification or relegation |
|---|---|---|---|---|---|---|---|---|---|---|
| 1 | Nottingham Forest (C) | 42 | 25 | 14 | 3 | 69 | 24 | +45 | 64 | Qualification for the European Cup first round (Note: Liverpool qualified for the European Cup first round as the 1977–78 European Cup winners.) |
| 2 | Liverpool | 42 | 24 | 9 | 9 | 65 | 34 | +31 | 57 | Qualification for the European Cup first round |
| 3 | Everton | 42 | 22 | 11 | 9 | 76 | 45 | +31 | 55 | Qualification for the UEFA Cup first round |
| 4 | Manchester City | 42 | 20 | 12 | 10 | 74 | 51 | +23 | 52 | Qualification for the UEFA Cup first round |
| 5 | Arsenal | 42 | 21 | 10 | 11 | 60 | 37 | +23 | 52 | Qualification for the UEFA Cup first round |

Source: World Football
Rules for classification: 1) Points; 2) Goal difference; 3) Goals scored
(C) Champions

==== Position by round ====
| Round | 1 | 2 | 3 | 4 | 5 | 6 | 7 | 8 | 9 | 10 | 11 | 12 | 13 | 14 | 15 | 16 | 17 | 18 | 19 | 20 | 21 | 22 | 23 | 24 | 25 | 26 | 27 | 28 | 29 | 30 | 31 | 32 | 33 | 34 | 35 | 36 | 37 | 38 | 39 | 40 | 41 | 42 |
|---|---|---|---|---|---|---|---|---|---|---|---|---|---|---|---|---|---|---|---|---|---|---|---|---|---|---|---|---|---|---|---|---|---|---|---|---|---|---|---|---|---|---|
| Ground | A | H | H | A | A | H | A | H | H | A | H | A | H | A | H | A | H | A | H | A | H | A | A | H | A | H | H | A | H | H | H | A | H | A | A | H | H | A | A | H | A | A |
| Result | W | W | W | L | W | W | W | D | W | D | W | W | W | L | W | L | D | W | W | W | D | W | W | D | D | W | W | D | W | W | W | D | W | W | D | D | W | D | W | D | D | D |
| Position | 5 | 1 | 1 | 4 | 3 | 3 | 2 | 2 | 1 | 1 | 1 | 1 | 1 | 1 | 1 | 1 | 1 | 1 | 1 | 1 | 1 | 1 | 1 | 1 | 1 | 1 | 1 | 1 | 1 | 1 | 1 | 1 | 1 | 1 | 1 | 1 | 1 | 1 | 1 | 1 | 1 | 1 |

Source: Competitive matches
A = Away; H = Home; W = Win; D = Draw; L = Loss; = Leader, 1978-79 European Cup; = 1978-79 UEFA Cup; = 1978-79 Second Division

A list of Nottingham Forest's matches in the 1977–78 season.

==== Matches ====
| 20 August 1977 1 | Everton | 1–3 | Nottingham Forest | Walton |
| | Pearson 44' | | Withe 20'; Robertson 38'; O'Neill 77' | Stadium: Goodison Park; Attendance: 38,001 |

| 23 August 1977 2 | Nottingham Forest | 1–0 | Bristol City | West Bridgford |
| | Withe 82' | | | Stadium: City Ground; Attendance: 21,743 |

| 27 August 1977 3 | Nottingham Forest | 3–0 | Derby County | West Bridgford |
| | Withe 31', 67'; Robertson 78' | | | Stadium: City Ground; Attendance: 28,807 |

| 3 September 1977 4 | Arsenal | 3–0 | Nottingham Forest | Islington |
| | Stapleton 3', 60'; Brady 69' (pen.) | | | Stadium: Highbury; Attendance: 40,810 |

| 10 September 1977 5 | Wolverhampton Wanderers | 2–3 | Nottingham Forest | Wolverhampton |
| | Bell 73'; Daley 82' (pen.) | | 18' Withe; 64' Bowyer; 72' Woodcock | Stadium: Molineux; Attendance: 24,662 |

| 17 September 1977 6 | Nottingham Forest | 2–0 | Aston Villa | West Bridgford |
| | Woodcock 5'; Robertson 89' | | | Stadium: City Ground; Attendance: 31,016 |

| 24 September 1977 7 | Leicester City | 0–3 | Nottingham Forest | Leicester |
| | | | O'Neill 18'; Woodcock 63'; Robertson 89' (pen.) | Stadium: Filbert Street; Attendance: 21,447 |

| 1 October 1977 8 | Nottingham Forest | 1–1 | Norwich City | West Bridgford |
| | Burns 73' | | Peters 78' | Stadium: City Ground; Attendance: 23,741 |

| 4 October 1977 9 | Nottingham Forest | 4–0 | Ipswich Town | West Bridgford |
| | Withe 43', 58', 86', 89' | | | Stadium: City Ground; Attendance: 26,845 |

| 8 October 1977 10 | West Ham United | 0–0 | Nottingham Forest | Upton Park |
| | | | | Stadium: Boleyn Ground; Attendance: 26,128 |

| 15 October 1977 11 | Nottingham Forest | 2–1 | Manchester City | West Bridgford |
| | Woodcock 34'; Withe 86' | | Kidd 21' | Stadium: City Ground; Attendance: 35,572 |

| 22 October 1977 12 | Queens Park Rangers | 0–2 | Nottingham Forest | Shepherd's Bush |
| | | | Bowyer 59'; Burns 82' | Stadium: Loftus Road; Attendance: 24,248 |

| 29 October 1977 13 | Nottingham Forest | 4–0 | Middlesbrough | West Bridgford |
| | Anderson 31', 44'; Bowyer 40'; McGovern 55' | | | Stadium: City Ground; Attendance: 27,373 |

| 5 November 1977 14 | Chelsea | 1–0 | Nottingham Forest | Fulham |
| | Aylott 55' | | | Stadium: Stamford Bridge; Attendance: 36,116 |

| 12 November 1977 15 | Nottingham Forest | 2–1 | Manchester United | West Bridgford |
| | Burns 49'; Gemmill 74' | | Pearson 5' | Stadium: City Ground; Attendance: 30,183 |

| 19 November 1977 16 | Leeds United | 1–0 | Nottingham Forest | Leeds |
| | Hankin 36' | | | Stadium: Elland Road; Attendance: 42,925 |

| 26 November 1977 17 | Nottingham Forest | 0–0 | West Bromwich Albion | West Bridgford |
| | | | | Stadium: City Ground; Attendance: 31,908 |

| 3 December 1977 18 | Birmingham City | 0–2 | Nottingham Forest | Birmingham |
| | | | O'Neill 10'; Woodcock 52' | Stadium: St. Andrew's; Attendance: 29,925 |

| 10 December 1977 19 | Nottingham Forest | 2–1 | Coventry City | West Bridgford |
| | O'Neill 40'; McGovern 44' | | Wallace 41' | Stadium: City Ground; Attendance: 29,823 |

| 17 December 1977 20 | Manchester United | 0–4 | Nottingham Forest | Manchester |
| | | | B. Greenhoff 23' (o.g.); Woodcock 28', 89'; Robertson 53' | Stadium: Old Trafford; Attendance: 54,375 |

| 26 December 1977 21 | Nottingham Forest | 1–1 | Liverpool | West Bridgford |
| | Gemmill 21' | | Heighway 39' | Stadium: City Ground; Attendance: 47,218 |

| 28 December 1977 22 | Newcastle United | 0–2 | Nottingham Forest | Newcastle upon Tyne |
| | | | Needham 16'; McGovern 71' | Stadium: St. James' Park; Attendance: 54,375 |

| 31 December 1977 23 | Bristol City | 1–3 | Nottingham Forest | Bristol |
| | Mabbutt 82' | | Needham 11'; Woodcock 21'; O'Neill 58' | Stadium: Ashton Gate; Attendance: 31,990 |

| 2 January 1978 24 | Nottingham Forest | 1–1 | Everton | West Bridgford |
| | Robertson 25' (pen.) | | Ross 85' (pen.) | Stadium: City Ground; Attendance: 44,030 |

| 14 January 1978 25 | Derby County | 0–0 | Nottingham Forest | Derby |
| | | | | Stadium: Baseball Ground; Attendance: 36,500 |

| 21 January 1978 26 | Nottingham Forest | 2–0 | Arsenal | West Bridgford |
| | Needham 32'; Gemmill 64' | | | Stadium: City Ground; Attendance: 35,743 |

| 4 February 1978 27 | Nottingham Forest | 2–0 | Wolverhampton Wanderers | West Bridgford |
| | Woodcock 40'; McGovern 53' | | | Stadium: City Ground; Attendance: 28,803 |

| 25 February 1978 28 | Norwich City | 3–3 | Nottingham Forest | Norwich |
| | Ryan 44' (pen.); Suggett 68'; Robson 70' | | Withe 16'; Barrett 22'; O'Neill 24' | Stadium: Carrow Road; Attendance: 26,004 |

| 4 March 1978 29 | Nottingham Forest | 2–0 | West Ham United | West Bridgford |
| | Needham 79'; Robertson 81' (pen.) | | | Stadium: City Ground; Attendance: 33,924 |

| 14 March 1978 30 | Nottingham Forest | 1–0 | Leicester City | West Bridgford |
| | Robertson 13' (pen.) | | | Stadium: City Ground; Attendance: 32,355 |

| 25 March 1978 31 | Nottingham Forest | 2–0 | Newcastle United | West Bridgford |
| | Robertson 32' (pen.); Anderson 67' | | | Stadium: City Ground; Attendance: 35,552 |

| 29 March 1978 32 | Middlesbrough | 2–2 | Nottingham Forest | Middlesbrough |
| | Mills 13'; Cummins 22' | | Woodcock 20'; O'Neill 54' | Stadium: Ayresome Park; Attendance: 25,445 |

| 1 April 1978 33 | Nottingham Forest | 3–1 | Chelsea | West Bridgford |
| | Burns 68'; O'Neill 82'; Robertson 87' | | Langley 8' | Stadium: City Ground; Attendance: 31,262 |

| 5 April 1978 34 | Aston Villa | 0–1 | Nottingham Forest | Birmingham |
| | | | Woodcock 86' | Stadium: Villa Park; Attendance: 44,315 |

| 11 April 1978 35 | Manchester City | 0–0 | Nottingham Forest | Moss Side |
| | | | | Stadium: Maine Road; Attendance: 43,428 |

| 15 April 1978 36 | Nottingham Forest | 1–1 | Leeds United | West Bridgford |
| | Withe 65' | | F. Gray 41' (pen.) | Stadium: City Ground; Attendance: 38,662 |

| 18 April 1978 37 | Nottingham Forest | 1–0 | Queens Park Rangers | West Bridgford |
| | Robertson 29' (pen.) | | | Stadium: City Ground; Attendance: 30,339 |

| 22 April 1978 38 | Coventry City | 0–0 | Nottingham Forest | Coventry |
| | | | | Stadium: Highfield Road; Attendance: 36,881 |

| 25 April 1978 39 | Ipswich Town | 0–2 | Nottingham Forest | Ipswich |
| | | | Mariner 73' (o.g.); Clark 78' | Stadium: Portman Road; Attendance: 30,062 |

| 29 April 1978 40 | Nottingham Forest | 0–0 | Birmingham City | West Bridgford |
| | | | | Stadium: City Ground; Attendance: 37,625 |

| 2 May 1978 41 | West Bromwich Albion | 2–2 | Nottingham Forest | West Bromwich |
| | T. Brown 28'; Hughes 35' | | Bowyer 16'; Robertson 36' (pen.) | Stadium: The Hawthorns; Attendance: 23,612 |

| 4 May 1978 42 | Liverpool | 0–0 | Nottingham Forest | Liverpool |
| | | | | Stadium: Anfield; Attendance: 50,021 |

=== League Cup ===
==== Second round ====
| 30 August 1977 | Nottingham Forest | 5–0 | West Ham United | Nottingham |
| | O'Neill 9'; Bowyer 25', 85'; Woodcock 65'; Withe 78' | | | Stadium: City Ground; Attendance: 18,224 |

==== Third round ====
| 25 October 1977 | Nottingham Forest | 4–0 | Notts County | Nottingham |
| | Robertson 16' (pen.); Woodcock 46'; Bowyer 65', 84' | | | Stadium: City Ground; Attendance: 26,931 |

==== Fourth round ====
| 29 November 1977 | Nottingham Forest | 4–2 | Aston Villa | Nottingham |
| | Lloyd 7'; Anderson 13'; Withe 25'; Woodcock 52' | | Little 79'; Carrodus 85' | Stadium: City Ground; Attendance: 29,333 |

==== Fifth round ====
| 17 January 1978 | Bury | 0–3 | Nottingham Forest | Bury |
| | | | Bowyer 8'; O'Neill 55'; Robertson 78' | Stadium: Gigg Lane; Attendance: 21,500 |

==== Semifinals ====
| 8 February 1978 1 | Leeds United | 1–3 | Nottingham Forest | Leeds |
| | E. Gray 28' | | Withe 19', 21'; O'Hare 75' | Stadium: Elland Road; Attendance: 43,222 |

| 22 February 1978 2 | Nottingham Forest | 4–2 (7–3 agg.) | Leeds United | Nottingham |
| | Withe 18'; Bowyer 49'; O'Neill 72'; Woodcock 75' | | F. Gray 13'; Graham 19' | Stadium: City Ground; Attendance: 38,131 |

==== Final ====
| 18 March 1978 | Nottingham Forest | 0–0 (a.e.t.) | Liverpool | London |
| | | | | Stadium: Wembley; Attendance: 100,000 |

| 22 March 1978 replay | Nottingham Forest | 1–0 | Liverpool | Manchester |
| | Robertson 52' (pen.) | | | Stadium: Old Trafford; Attendance: 54,375 |

=== FA Cup ===
==== Third round ====
| 7 January 1978 | Nottingham Forest | 4–1 | Swindon Town | Nottingham |
| | Woodcock 37', 77'; Withe 55'; Robertson 67' | | Moss 84' | Stadium: City Ground; Attendance: 28,953 |

==== Fourth round ====
| 31 January 1978 | Nottingham Forest | 2–1 | Manchester City | Nottingham |
| | Robertson 3'; Withe 59' | | Kidd 61' | Stadium: City Ground; Attendance: 38,509 |

==== Fifth round ====
| 18 February 1978 | Queens Park Rangers | 1–1 | Nottingham Forest | London |
| | Busby 18' | | O'Neill 89' | Stadium: Loftus Road; Attendance: 26,803 |

| 27 February 1978 replay | Nottingham Forest | 1–1 (a.e.t.) | Queens Park Rangers | Nottingham |
| | Robertson 19' (pen.) | | Shanks 43' | Stadium: City Ground; Attendance: 40,097 |

| 2 March 1978 2nd replay | Nottingham Forest | 3–1 | Queens Park Rangers | Nottingham |
| | O'Neill 2'; Woodcock 65', 79' | | Bowles 64' | Stadium: City Ground; Attendance: 33,960 |

==== Sixth round ====
| 11 March 1978 | West Bromwich Albion | 2–0 | Nottingham Forest | West Bromwich |
| | Martin 15'; Regis 47' | | | Stadium: The Hawthorns; Attendance: 36,506 |

=== Pre-season and Friendlies ===
| 1 August 1977 Friendly | St Gallen (Switzerland) | 2–3 | Nottingham Forest | St Gallen, Switzerland |
| | | | Bowyer 51'; Withe 7' 37' | Stadium: Espenmoos; Attendance: 2,300 |

| 3 August 1977 Friendly | Wacker Innsbruck (Austria) | 0–2 | Nottingham Forest | Innsbruck, Austria |
| | | | Woodcock; Robertson | Attendance: 7,300 |

| 5 August 1977 Friendly | SV Plattling (West Germany) | 1–5 | Nottingham Forest | Plattling, Germany |
| | | | O'Neill; Elliott; Birtles | Stadium: Rennbahnstadion; Attendance: 1,500 |

| 6 August 1977 Friendly | VfR Neuburg (West Germany) | 1–5 | Nottingham Forest | Neuberg, Germany |
| | | | Woodcock; Barrett; O'Neill; Bowyer | Attendance: 1,000 |

| 9 August 1977 Friendly | SC Bregenz (Austria) | 0–3 | Nottingham Forest | Bregenz, Austria |
| | | | Elliott; Woodcock | Stadium: Casino Stadium; Attendance: 2,000 |

| 13 August 1977 Centenary Match | Skegness Town | 0–4 | Nottingham Forest | Skegness |
| | | | Burns; Bowyer; Elliott; Robertson ((pen.)) | Stadium: Burgh Road; Attendance: 2,500 |

| 15 August 1977 County Cup Final | Nottingham Forest | 1–1 (3–2 p) | Notts County | Nottingham |
| | Bowyer 49' | | Smith | Stadium: City Ground; Attendance: 11,569; Referee: G. Flint |

| 12 September 1977 Liam O'Kane Testimonial | Nottingham Forest XI | 0–0 | Leicester City XI | Nottingham |
| | | | | Stadium: City Ground; Attendance: 5,190; Referee: B. Martin |

| 17 October 1977 John Harris Testimonial | Sheffield United XI | 1–6 | Nottingham Forest | Sheffield |
| | | | Burns; Withe; Woodcock; Robertson | Stadium: Bramall Lane; Attendance: 6,780; Referee: K. Styles |

| 14 November 1977 Alan Goad Testimonial | Hartlepool United | 2–2 | Nottingham Forest | Hartlepool |
| | | | Burns; Woodcock | Stadium: Victoria Park; Attendance: 4,000; Referee: P. Partridge |

| 22 November 1977 Friendly | Maccabi Tel Aviv (Israel) | 1–6 | Nottingham Forest | Tel Aviv, Israel |
| | | | Anderson; McGovern; Lloyd; Woodcock; O'Hare | Stadium: Bloomfield Stadium; Attendance: 19,000 |

| 3 April 1978 Henry Newton Testimonial | Derby County | 1–2 | Nottingham Forest | Derby |
| | | | Lloyd; Bowyer | Stadium: The Baseball Ground; Attendance: 9,070; Referee: M. Taylor |

| 12 April 1978 Les Bradd Testimonial | Notts County | 0–1 | Nottingham Forest | Nottingham |
| | | | O'Hare | Stadium: Meadow Lane; Attendance: 10,129; Referee: B. Martin |

| 1 May 1978 Brian Clough & Peter Taylor Testimonial | Nottingham Forest | 2–1 | Derby County | Nottingham |
| | McGovern; Withe | | | Stadium: City Ground; Attendance: 18,272; Referee: C. White |

== Statistics ==
=== Squad statistics ===
| No. | Pos | Nat | Player | Total | | Football League Division One | | Football League Cup | | FA Cup | |
| No. | Pos | Nat | Player | Apps | Goals | Apps | Goals | Apps | Goals | Apps | Goals |
|---|---|---|---|---|---|---|---|---|---|---|---|
| | GK | (England) ENG | Peter Shilton | 43 | 0 | 37 | 0 | 0 | 0 | 6 | 0 |
| | DF | (England) ENG | Viv Anderson | 50 | 4 | 37 | 3 | 8 | 1 | 5 | 0 |
| | DF | (Scotland) SCO | Kenny Burns | 55 | 4 | 41 | 4 | 8 | 0 | 6 | 0 |
| | DF | (England) ENG | Larry Lloyd | 34 | 1 | 26 | 0 | 6 | 1 | 2 | 0 |
| | DF | (England) ENG | Colin Barrett | 43 | 1 | 33+2 | 1 | 5 | 0 | 3 | 0 |
| | MF | (Northern Ireland) NIR | Martin O'Neill | 54 | 13 | 38+2 | 8 | 8 | 3 | 6 | 2 |
| | MF | (Scotland) SCO | Archie Gemmill | 38 | 3 | 32+2 | 3 | 0 | 0 | 4 | 0 |
| | MF | (Scotland) SCO | John McGovern | 42 | 5 | 31 | 4 | 7 | 1 | 4 | 0 |
| | MF | (Scotland) SCO | John Robertson | 56 | 18 | 42 | 12 | 8 | 3 | 6 | 3 |
| | FW | (England) ENG | Peter Withe | 54 | 19 | 40 | 12 | 8 | 5 | 6 | 2 |
| | FW | (England) ENG | Tony Woodcock | 50 | 19 | 36 | 11 | 8 | 4 | 6 | 4 |
| | GK | (England) ENG | John Middleton | 6 | 0 | 5 | 0 | 1 | 0 | 0 | 0 |
| | MF | (England) ENG | Ian Bowyer | 39 | 10 | 25+3 | 4 | 8 | 6 | 3 | 0 |
| | DF | (England) ENG | David Needham | 22 | 4 | 16 | 4 | 0 | 0 | 6 | 0 |
| | DF | (England) ENG | Frank Clark | 20 | 1 | 12+1 | 1 | 4 | 0 | 3 | 0 |
| | FW | (Scotland) SCO | John O'Hare | 13 | 1 | 10 | 0 | 1+1 | 1 | 0+1 | 0 |
| | GK | (England) ENG | Chris Woods | 7 | 0 | 0 | 0 | 7 | 0 | 0 | 0 |
| | DF | (England) ENG | Bryn Gunn | 0 | 0 | 0 | 0 | 0 | 0 | 0 | 0 |
| | MF | (England) ENG | Steve Burke | 0 | 0 | 0 | 0 | 0 | 0 | 0 | 0 |
| | FW | (England) ENG | Garry Birtles | 0 | 0 | 0 | 0 | 0 | 0 | 0 | 0 |
| | FW | (England) ENG | Steve Elliott | 0 | 0 | 0 | 0 | 0 | 0 | 0 | 0 |
