= 1978–79 Nottingham Forest F.C. season =

English football club season

Nottingham Forest F.C.
1978–79 season
- Chairman: S.M. Dryden, J.P.
- Manager: Brian Clough
- Division One: Runners-up
- FA Cup: 5th Round
- Football League Cup: Winners
- FA Charity Shield: Winners
- European Cup: Winners (In 1979–80 European Cup)
- Top goalscorer: League: Birtles (14); All: Birtles (26)
- Highest home attendance: 41,898 vs. Liverpool (Division One, 28 April 1979)
- Lowest home attendance: 20,388 vs Southampton (Division One, 2 May 1979)
- Average home league attendance: 30,446
Home colours	Away colours

The 1978–79 season was Nottingham Forest's second year back in the Football League First Division. They had won the title in the previous season, meaning that they qualified for the European Cup for the first time in their history.

== Summary ==
Forest opened the defence of their title with six draws in their first seven league matches. On 7 September the 2–1 win at Aston Villa broke the previous undefeated record of 34 consecutive league games by Don Revie' Leeds United in the 1968–69 season. On 28 November the 1–0 win at Bolton set an undefeated record of 42 consecutive league games. The record stood for twenty six years. Garry Birtles broke into the first team and ended up being the club's top scorer as they ended up as league runners-up, retained the League Cup and won the European Cup. Along the way they knocked out holders Liverpool and came from behind to oust West German champions Cologne. Trevor Francis became the first £1,000,000 player when he signed for the Reds from Birmingham City and immediately proved his worth by scoring the only goal of the European Cup final against Malmö in Munich. 26 year old Colin Barrett suffered a serious leg injury 10 days after scoring in the win against Liverpool. He only played seven further competitive games for Forest and 12 in his career.

== Players ==
Note: Flags indicate national team as defined under FIFA eligibility rules; some limited exceptions apply. Players may hold more than one non-FIFA nationality.

Pos.	Nation	Player
GK	ENG	Peter Shilton
GK	ENG	Jim Montgomery
GK	ENG	Chris Woods
DF	ENG	Viv Anderson
DF	SCO	Kenny Burns
DF	ENG	Larry Lloyd
DF	ENG	Frank Clark
DF	ENG	Dave Needham
DF	ENG	Colin Barrett
DF	ENG	Bryn Gunn
MF	NIR	Martin O'Neill

Pos.	Nation	Player
MF	SCO	John McGovern
MF	ENG	Ian Bowyer
MF	SCO	John Robertson
MF	SCO	Archie Gemmill
MF	SCO	John O'Hare
MF	ENG	Gary Mills
MF	ENG	Steve Burke
FW	ENG	Garry Birtles
FW	ENG	Tony Woodcock
FW	ENG	Trevor Francis
FW	ENG	Steve Elliott
FW	ENG	Peter Withe

=== Transfers ===
In
Pos.	Name	from	Type
GK	Jimmy Montgomery	Birmingham City	
MF	Gary Mills	Youth system	

Out
Pos.	Name	To	Type
FW	Peter Withe	Newcastle United	£200,000

==== Winter ====
In
Pos.	Name	from	Type
FW	Trevor Francis	Birmingham City	£999,999.99

Out
Pos.	Name	To	Type

== Competitions ==
Competition	Started round	Final position / round	First match	Last match
First Division	–	2nd	1 August 1978	2 May 1979
FA Cup	–	Fifth round	1 August 1978	
FA Cup	–	Fifth round		

=== Division One ===
==== League table ====
Pos	Team	Pld	W	D	L	GF	GA	GD	Pts	Qualification or relegation
1	Liverpool (C)	42	30	8	4	85	16	+69	68	Qualification for the European Cup first round (Note: Nottingham Forest qualified for the European Cup first round as the 1978–79 European Cup winners.)
2	Nottingham Forest	42	21	18	3	61	26	+35	60	Qualification for the European Cup first round
3	West Bromwich Albion	42	24	11	7	72	35	+37	59	Qualification for the UEFA Cup first round
4	Everton	42	17	17	8	52	40	+12	51	Qualification for the UEFA Cup first round
5	Leeds United	42	18	14	10	70	52	+18	50	Qualification for the UEFA Cup first round

Source: World Football
Rules for classification: 1) Points; 2) Goal difference; 3) Goals scored
(C) Champions

==== Results by round ====
Round	1	2	3	4	5	6	7	8	9	10	11	12	13	14	15	16	17	18	19	20	21	22	23	24	25	26	27	28	29	30	31	32	33	34	35	36	37	38	39	40	41	42
Ground	H	A	A	H	H	A	H	A	H	A	H	A	H	A	H	A	A	H	A	H	A	A	H	A	A	H	H	H	H	H	A	A	H	H	A	H	A	H	A	H	A	A
Result	D	D	D	D	W	D	D	W	W	W	W	D	D	W	D	W	L	W	D	D	L	W	W	D	D	W	W	W	D	W	W	W	D	D	W	D	L	W	D	W	W	W
Position	11	13	10	10	6	9	8	6	4	3	3	3	4	4	4	4	4	5	5	5	5	5	6	6	6	6	6	6	6	6	4	4	3	4	3	3	2	3	3	3	3	2

Source: Competitive matches
A = Away; H = Home; W = Win; D = Draw; L = Loss; = Leader, 1979–80 European Cup; = 1979–80 UEFA Cup; = 1979–80 Second Division

==== Matches ====
19 August 1978 1	Nottingham Forest	1–1	Tottenham Hotspur	West Bridgford
	O'Neill 12'		Villa 27'	Stadium: City Ground; Attendance: 41,223

22 August 1978 2	Coventry City	0–0	Nottingham Forest	Coventry
				Stadium: Highfield Road; Attendance: 28,585

26 August 1978 3	Queens Park Rangers	0–0	Nottingham Forest	Shepherd's Bush
				Stadium: Loftus Road; Attendance: 17,971

2 September 1978 4	Nottingham Forest	0–0	West Bromwich Albion	West Bridgford
				Stadium: City Ground; Attendance: 28,239

9 September 1978 5	Nottingham Forest	2–1	Arsenal	West Bridgford
	Bowyer 71'; Robertson 53' (pen.)		6' Brady	Stadium: City Ground; Attendance: 28,124

16 September 1978 6	Manchester United	1–1	Nottingham Forest	Manchester
	66' J Greenhoff		10' Bowyer	Stadium: Old Trafford; Attendance: 53,039

23 September 1978 7	Nottingham Forest	2–2	Middlesbrough	West Bridgford
	Birtles 18'; O'Neill 44'		46' Mills; 49' Armstrong	Stadium: City Ground; Attendance: 26,287

30 September 1978 8	Aston Villa	1–2	Nottingham Forest	Birmingham
	18' (pen.) Craig		49' Woodcock; 79' (pen.) Robertson	Stadium: Villa Park; Attendance: 36,735

7 October 1978 9	Nottingham Forest	3–1	Wolverhampton Wanderers	West Bridgford
	Birtles 25', 60'; O'Neill 55'			Stadium: City Ground; Attendance: 29,313

14 October 1978 10	Bristol City	1–3	Nottingham Forest	Bristol
	Ritchie 11' (pen.)		Birtles 5'; Robertson 26' (pen.), 54' (pen.)	Stadium: Ashton Gate; Attendance: 26,953

21 October 1978 11	Nottingham Forest	1–0	Ipswich Town	West Bridgford
	O'Neill 13'			Stadium: City Ground; Attendance: 28,911

28 October 1978 12	Southampton	0–0	Nottingham Forest	Southampton
				Stadium: The Dell; Attendance: 22,530

4 November 1978 13	Nottingham Forest	0–0	Everton	West Bridgford
				Stadium: City Ground; Attendance: 35,415

11 November 1978 14	Tottenham Hotspur	1–3	Nottingham Forest	Tottenham
	Pratt 80'		Anderson 63'; Robertson 68'; Birtles 82'	Stadium: White Hart Lane; Attendance: 50,541

18 November 1978 15	Nottingham Forest	0–0	Queens Park Rangers	West Bridgford
				Stadium: City Ground; Attendance: 28,036

25 November 1978 16	Bolton Wanderers	0–1	Nottingham Forest	Bolton
	67' Robertson			Stadium: Burnden Park; Attendance: 25,692

9 December 1978 18	Liverpool	2–0	Nottingham Forest	Liverpool
16:00 GMT	McDermott 29' (pen.), 48'			Stadium: Anfield; Attendance: 51,469

16 December 1978 19	Nottingham Forest	1–0	Birmingham City	West Bridgford
	Gemmill 72'			Stadium: City Ground; Attendance: 25,224

23 December 1978 20	Manchester City	0–0	Nottingham Forest	Moss Side
				Stadium: Maine Road; Attendance: 37,012

26 December 1978 21	Nottingham Forest	1–1	Derby County	West Bridgford
	Woodcock 55'		45' (pen.) Daly	Stadium: City Ground; Attendance: 34,256

13 January 1979 23	Arsenal F.C.	2–1	Nottingham Forest	Islington
	Stapleton 81'; Price 61'		38' Robertson	Stadium: Highbury Park; Attendance: 52,158

3 February 1979 24	Middlesbrough F.C.	1–3	Nottingham Forest	Middlesbrough
	Proctor 24'		17' Birtles; 62' Birtles; 47' (pen.) Robertson	Stadium: Ayresome Park; Attendance: 31,330

24 February 1979 26	Nottingham Forest	2–0	Bristol City	West Bridgford
	Needham 8'; Birtles 16'			Stadium: City Ground; Attendance: 28,008

3 March 1979 27	Ipswich Town	1–1	Nottingham Forest	Ipswich
	Brazil 54'		24' Birtles	Stadium: Portman Road; Attendance: 27,198

10 March 1979 28	Everton F.C.	1–1	Nottingham Forest	Walton
	Telfer 5'		18' Barrett	Stadium: Goodison Park; Attendance: 37,745

14 March 1979 29	Nottingham Forest	2–1	Norwich City	West Bridgford
	Woodcock 53'; Woodcock 61'		67' Fashanu	Stadium: City Ground; Attendance: 24,046

24 March 1979 28	Nottingham Forest	3–0	Coventry City	West Bridgford
	Woodcock 25'; Birtles 65'; Needham 85'			Stadium: City Ground; Attendance: 24,514

28 March 1979 17	Nottingham Forest	6–0	Chelsea F.C.	West Bridgford
19:30	O'Neill 45'; Woodcock 46'; Birtles 54'; Woodcock 63'; O'Neill 65'; O'Neill 71'			Stadium: City Ground; Attendance: 24,514; Referee: Bert Newsome

31 March 1979 29	Nottingham Forest	1–1	Bolton Wanderers	West Bridgford
	Francis 89'		35' Gowling	Stadium: City Ground; Attendance: 29,015

4 April 1979 32	Nottingham Forest	4–0	Aston Villa	West Bridgford
	Evans 13' (o.g.); Woodcock 49'; Francis 55'; O'Neill 71'			Stadium: City Ground; Attendance: 27,056

7 April 1979 33	Chelsea F.C.	1–3	Nottingham Forest	Fulham
	Wilkins 61'		9' Francis; 43' O'Neill 47' Bowyer	Stadium: Stamford Bridge; Attendance: 29,213

14 April 1979 35	Derby County	1–2	Nottingham Forest	Derby
	Webb 42'		27' Birtles; 34' O'Neill	Stadium: Baseball Ground; Attendance: 30,156

16 April 1979 36	Nottingham Forest	0–0	Leeds United	West Bridgford
				Stadium: City Ground; Attendance: 37,397

18 April 1979	Nottingham Forest	1–1	Manchester United	West Bridgford
	Francis 87'		47' Jordan	Stadium: City Ground; Attendance: 33,074

21 April 1979 37	Birmingham City	0–2	Nottingham Forest	Birmingham
			5' Birtles; 48' Robertson	Stadium: St'Andrews Park; Attendance: 22,189

28 April 1979 39	Nottingham Forest	0–0	Liverpool F.C.	West Bridgford
				Stadium: Nottingham; Attendance: 41,898

30 April 1979 40	Wolverhampton Wanderers	1–0	Nottingham Forest	Wolverhampton
	Richards			Stadium: Molineux; Attendance: 23,616

2 May 1979	Nottingham Forest	1–0	Southampton	West Bridgford
	Francis 66'			Stadium: City Ground; Attendance: 20,388

5 May 1979 41	Norwich City	1–1	Nottingham Forest	Norwich
	Reeves 27'		56' Woodcock	Stadium: Carrow Road; Attendance: 17,651

9 May 1979 42	Nottingham Forest	3–1	Manchester City	West Bridgford
	Birtles 4'; Bowyer 60' Woodcock 61'		51' (o.g.) Lloyd	Stadium: City Ground; Attendance: 21,104

15 May 1979	Leeds United	1–2	Nottingham Forest	Leeds
	Cherry 60'		5' Mills; 85' (o.g.) Hawley	Stadium: Elland Road; Attendance: 33,544

18 May 1979	West Bromwich Albion	0–1	Nottingham Forest	West Bromwich
			82' Francis	Stadium: The Hawthorns; Attendance: 28,246

Last updated: 28 August 2011
Source: Bridport Red Archive

=== League Cup ===
==== Round Two ====
29 August 1978	Oldham Athletic	0–0	Nottingham Forest	Oldham
				Stadium: Boundary Park; Attendance: 13,793

6 September 1978 replay	Nottingham Forest	4–2	Oldham Athletic	Nottingham
	Needham 49'; Burns 57'; Woodcock 61'; Robertson 63' (pen.)		Alan Young; Vic Halom	Stadium: City Ground; Attendance: 19,669

==== Round Three ====
4 October 1978	Oxford United	0–5	Nottingham Forest	Oxford
			24' Birtles; 30' McGovern; 43' O'Neill; 59' Robertson; 89' Anderson	Stadium: Manor Ground; Attendance: 14,287

==== Round Four ====
7 November 1978	Everton	2–3	Nottingham Forest	Liverpool
	Kenny Burns 15' (o.g.); Bob Latchford 88'		52' Lloyd; 73' Anderson; 75' Woodcock	Stadium: Goodison Park; Attendance: 48,503

==== Round Five ====
13 December 1978 R5	Nottingham Forest	3–1	Brighton & Hove Albion	Nottingham
	McGovern 21'; Birtles 66'; Robertson 59'		50' Peter Ward	Stadium: City Ground; Attendance: 30,672

==== Semifinals ====
17 January 1979 1	Nottingham Forest	3–1	Watford	Nottingham
	Birtles 13', 47'; Robertson 79'		9' Blissett	Stadium: City Ground; Attendance: 32,438

30 January 1979 2	Watford	0–0 (1–3 agg.)	Nottingham Forest	Watford
				Stadium: Vicarage Road; Attendance: 27,656

==== Final ====
17 March 1979 Final	Nottingham Forest	3–2	Southampton	Wembley, London
	Birtles 51', 79'; Woodcock 83'		16' David Peach; 88' Holmes	Stadium: Wembley; Attendance: 96,952; Referee: P. Reeves

Last updated: 28 August 2011
Source: Bridport Red Archive

=== FA Cup ===
==== Third round ====
10 January 1979	Nottingham Forest	2-0 (a.e.t.)	Aston Villa	Nottingham
	Needham 58'; Woodcock 73'			Stadium: City Ground; Attendance: 29,550

==== Fourth round ====
27 January 1979 Fourth round	Nottingham Forest	3–1	York City	Nottingham
	McGovern 44'; Lloyd 15'; O'Neill 73'		81' Barry Wellings	Stadium: City Ground; Attendance: 25,228

==== Fifth round ====
26 February 1979 Fifth round	Nottingham Forest	0–1	Arsenal	Nottingham
			Stapleton	Stadium: City Ground; Attendance: 35,908; Referee: -

Last updated: 28 August 2011
Source: Bridport Red Archive

=== FA Charity Shield ===
12 August 1978 Final	Nottingham Forest	5–0	Ipswich Town	Wembley, London
15:00 UTC+1	O'Neill 10', 65'; Lloyd 46'; Withe 27'; Robertson 87'			Stadium: Wembley; Attendance: 64,438; Referee: P. Reeves

Last updated: 28 August 2011
Source: Bridport Red Archive

=== European Cup ===
==== First round ====
13 September 1978 First Leg	Nottingham Forest (England)	2–0	(England) Liverpool	Nottingham
	Barrett 87'; Birtles 26'			Stadium: City Ground; Attendance: 38,318; Referee: -

27 September 1978 Second Leg	Liverpool (England)	0–0 (0–2 agg.)	(England) Nottingham Forest	Liverpool, England
				Stadium: Anfield; Attendance: 51,679; Referee: -

===== Second round =====
18 October 1978 First Leg	AEK Athens (Greece)	1–2	(England) Nottingham Forest	Athens, Greece
			McGovern; Birtles	Stadium: AEK Stadium; Attendance: 36,000; Referee: -

1 November 1978 Second Leg	Nottingham Forest (England)	5–1 (7–2 agg.)	(Greece) AEK Athens	Nottingham
	Needham; Woodcock; Anderson; Birtles,			Stadium: City Ground; Attendance: 38,069; Referee: -

===== Quarter-final =====
7 March 1979 First Leg	Nottingham Forest (England)	4–1	(Switzerland) Grasshopper	Nottingham
	Lloyd; Gemmil; Birtles; Robertson ((pen.))			Stadium: City Ground; Attendance: 31,949; Referee: -

21 March 1979 Second Leg	Grasshopper (Switzerland)	1–1 (2–5 agg.)	(England) Nottingham Forest	Zurich, Switzerland
			O'Neill	Stadium: Hardturm; Attendance: 7,800; Referee: -

===== Semi-final =====
11 April 1979	Nottingham Forest (England)	3–3	(West Germany) 1. FC Köln	Nottingham
	Birtles 28'; Bowyer 53'; Robertson 63'	Report	6' Van Gool; 20' Müller; 85' Okudera	Stadium: City Ground; Attendance: 40,804; Referee: (Portugal) António Garrido

25 April 1979	1. FC Köln (West Germany)	0–1 (3-4 agg.)	(England) Nottingham Forest	Cologne
		Report	65' Bowyer	Stadium: Müngersdorder Stadion; Attendance: 60,000; Referee: (Romania) Nicolae Rainea

===== Final =====
30 May 1979	Malmö FF (Sweden)	0–1	(England) Nottingham Forest	Munich
20:15 CET		Report	Francis 45+1'	Stadium: Olympiastadion; Attendance: 68,000; Referee: (Austria) Erich Linemayr

Last updated: 28 August 2011
Source: Bridport Red Archive

=== Pre-season and Friendlies ===
25 July 1978 Friendly	Red Star Belgrade (Socialist Federal Republic of Yugoslavia)	3–2	(England) Nottingham Forest	Belgrade, Yugoslavia
			O'Neill; Withe	Stadium: Stadion FK Crvena Zvezda; Attendance: 33,000; Referee: -

27 July 1978 Friendly	Dinamo Zagreb (Socialist Federal Republic of Yugoslavia)	1–1	(England) Nottingham Forest	Zagreb, Yugoslavia
			Needham	Stadium: Stadion Maksimir; Attendance: 35,000; Referee: Raus

30 July 1978 Friendly	NK Osijek (Socialist Federal Republic of Yugoslavia)	1–1	(England) Nottingham Forest	Osijek, Yugoslavia
			Bowyer	Stadium: Stadion Gradski vrt Attendance: 15,000; Referee: Fresl

2 August 1978 Friendly	AEK Athens (Greece)	1–1	(England) Nottingham Forest	Athens, Greece
	Viera 69'		15' Woodcock	Stadium: AEK Stadium; Attendance: 30,000; Referee: Alexopoulos

14 August 1978 Vigo Tournament	R.C. Celta Vigo (Spain)	1–1	(England) Nottingham Forest	Vigo, Spain
	Senra 89'		90+2' Withe	Stadium: Balaídos; Attendance: 13,000; Referee: Balsa-Ron

16 August 1978 Vigo Tournament	F.C. Porto (Portugal)	1–0	(England) Nottingham Forest	Vigo, Spain
	Gonzales 81'			Stadium: Balaídos; Attendance: 25,000; Referee: Garcia De Loza

4 September 1978 Sandy Pate Testimonial	Mansfield Town	1–6	Nottingham Forest	Mansfield
				Stadium: Field Mill; Attendance: 7,051; Referee: -

5 December 1978 Friendly	Nottingham Forest (England)	2–0	(Socialist Federal Republic of Yugoslavia) Dinamo Zagreb	Nottingham
	Birtles,			Stadium: City Ground; Attendance: 5,338; Referee: Styles

19 February 1979 Nick Jennings Testimonial	Exeter City	0–5	Nottingham Forest	Exeter
			Anderson; Birtles, Woodcock; Bowyer	Stadium: St James Park; Attendance: 9,479; Referee: Atkins

21 February 1979 Trevor Stokes Testimonial	West Bromwich Albion	0–0	Nottingham Forest	Witney
				Stadium: Marriots Stadium; Attendance: 3,500; Referee: Ladbrook

11 May 1979 Lawrie McMenemy Testimonial	Southampton	0–4	Nottingham Forest	Southampton
			, Bowyer; Birtles; Mills	Stadium: The Dell; Attendance: 14,693; Referee: -

== Statistics ==
=== Squad statistics ===
No.	Pos	Nat	Player	Total		Football League Division One		Football League Cup		FA Cup		European Cup	
No.	Pos	Nat	Player	Apps	Goals	Apps	Goals	Apps	Goals	Apps	Goals	Apps	Goals
	GK	(England) ENG	Shilton	62	0	42	0	8	0	3	0	9	0
	DF	(England) ENG	Anderson	58	3	40	1	7	2	3	0	8	0
	DF	(Scotland) SCO	Burns	36	1	25	0	5	1	1	0	5	0
	DF	(England) ENG	Lloyd	54	3	36	0	7	1	3	1	8	1
	DF	(England) ENG	Clark	32	0	20	0	3	0	2	0	7	0
	MF	(Northern Ireland) NIR	O'Neill	41	13	28	10	6	1	3	1	4	1
	MF	(Scotland) SCO	McGovern	54	4	36	0	7	2	3	1	8	1
	MF	(England) ENG	Bowyer	40	6	26+3	4	5	0	1	0	5	2
	MF	(Scotland) SCO	Robertson	62	15	42	9	8	4	3	0	9	2
	FW	(England) ENG	Birtles	54	26	35	14	7	6	3	0	9	6
	FW	(England) ENG	Woodcock	56	15	36	10	8	3	3	1	9	1
	GK	(England) ENG	Montgomery	0	0	0	0	0	0	0	0	0	0
	MF	(Scotland) SCO	Gemmill	40	2	24	1	6	0	3	0	7	1
	DF	(England) ENG	Needham	38	5	23+3	2	6	1	2	1	4	1
	FW	(England) ENG	Francis	21	7	19+1	6	0	0	0	0	1	1
	DF	(England) ENG	Barrett	17	2	11	1	3	0	0	0	3	1
	MF	(Scotland) SCO	O'Hare	14	0	9+2	0	1+1	0	0	0	1	0
	MF	(England) ENG	Mills	6	1	4	1	0+1	0	0	0	0+1	0
	FW	(England) ENG	Elliott	6	0	4	0	2	0	0	0	0	0
	FW	(England) ENG	Withe	1	0	1	0	0	0	0	0	0	0
	DF	(England) ENG	Gunn	1	0	1	0	0	0	0	0	0	0
	GK	(England) ENG	Woods	0	0	0	0	0	0	0	0	0	0
	MF	(England) ENG	Burke	0	0	0	0	0	0	0	0	0	0

Last updated: 28 August 2011
Source: The City Ground
