= 1979–80 Nottingham Forest F.C. season =

English football club season

Nottingham Forest F.C.
1979–80 season
- Chairman: Stuart Dryden
- Manager: Brian Clough
- Stadium: The City Ground
- First Division: 5th
- FA Cup: 4th round
- League Cup: Runners up
- European Cup: Winners (in 1979-80 European Cup)
- European Super Cup: Winners
- Top goalscorer: League: Trevor Francis (14); All: Robertson (19)
- Highest home attendance: 32,266 (League)
- Lowest home attendance: 21,242 (League)
- Average home league attendance: 26,330 (League)
Home colours	Away colours

The 1979–80 season was Nottingham Forest's 115th year in existence and third consecutive season in the First Division.

== Summary ==
During summer chairman Stuart M. Dryden reinforced the squad with several players, Left-back Frank Clark announced his retirement and the club bought Frank Gray from Leeds United for £500,000 to cover the position. To replace Archie Gemmill in midfield, the club bought Asa Hartford from Manchester City only to sell him on to Everton F.C. for a small loss after just three games and two months at the club. With the team plummeting to mid-table by winter the club loaned in Forward Charlie George from Southampton F.C. who only played 4 matches and failed to reinforce an attack already weakened after the departure of Tony Woodcock to 1.FC Köln and the injury of Trevor Francis. Also, signing in mid-season was midfielder Stan Bowles from Queen's Park Rangers but the transfer did not work out owing to differences between Bowles and manager Clough. The relative lack of impact of many of these signings led to a 5th place league finish after being title contenders in the two previous seasons.

The club refused to play the Intercontinental Cup against Paraguayan side and Copa Libertadores Champion Club Olimpia. In the FA Cup the team was eliminated by Liverpool F.C. in fourth round. In the League Cup the squad fell short of a third consecutive win at the last hurdle, losing in Final to Wolverhampton Wanderers by a single goal. However, the squad won its first European Super Cup with a 2–1 aggregate score after two legs against FC Barcelona. In the European Cup as the holders, the club which advanced again to the Final and clinched its second successive title after defeating 1–0 West German side Hamburg SV who fielded the then-England captain and ex-Liverpool fan favourite Kevin Keegan.

== Squad ==
Note: Flags indicate national team as defined under FIFA eligibility rules; some limited exceptions apply. Players may hold more than one non-FIFA nationality.

Pos.	Nation	Player
GK	ENG	Peter Shilton
GK	ENG	Jimmy Montgomery
GK	ENG	Steve Sutton
DF	ENG	Viv Anderson
DF	ENG	Larry Lloyd
DF	SCO	Kenny Burns
DF	SCO	Frank Gray
DF	ENG	Bryn Gunn
DF	ENG	David Needham
MF	NIR	Martin O'Neill
MF	SCO	John McGovern (c)

Pos.	Nation	Player
MF	SCO	John Robertson
MF	ENG	Ian Bowyer
MF	ENG	Gary Mills
MF	SCO	John O'Hare
MF	SCO	Asa Hartford
MF	SCO	Colin Walsh
FW	ENG	Trevor Francis
FW	ENG	Stan Bowles
FW	ENG	Garry Birtles
FW	ENG	Tony Woodcock
FW	ENG	Charlie George

=== Transfers ===
In
Pos.	Name	from	Type
FW	Charlie George	Southampton F.C.	loan
GK	Jimmy Montgomery	Birmingham City	
MF	Asa Hartford	Manchester City	£385,000 (Note: Transferred in on 18 August 1979)
DF	Frank Gray	Leeds United	£500,000 (Note: Transferred in on 18 August 1979)

Out
Pos.	Name	To	Type
GK	Chris Woods	Queen's Park Rangers	£250,000
DF	Frank Clark		Retired
MF	Steve Elliott	Preston North End	
MF	Archie Gemmill	Birmingham City	
MF	Steve Burke	Queen's Park Rangers	£125,000
MF	Asa Hartford	Everton F.C.	£308,000 (Note: Transferred out on 25 August 1979)

==== Winter ====
In
Pos.	Name	from	Type
FW	Stan Bowles	Queen's Park Rangers	(Note: Transferred in on 22 December 1979)

Out
Pos.	Name	To	Type
FW	Tony Woodcock	1.FC Köln	£875,000 (Note: Transferred out on 17 November 1979)

==== Spring ====
In
Pos.	Name	from	Type

Out
Pos.	Name	To	Type
DF	Colin Barrett	Swindon Town	(Note: Transferred out on 18 April 1979)
MF	Stan Bowles	Leyton Orient F.C.	£100,000 (Note: Transferred out on 9 May 1980)

== Competitions ==
A list of Nottingham Forest's matches in the 1979–80 season.

=== First Division ===
==== League table ====
Pos	Team	Pld	W	D	L	GF	GA	GD	Pts	Qualification or relegation
3	Ipswich Town	42	22	9	11	68	39	+29	53	Qualification for the UEFA Cup first round
4	Arsenal	42	18	16	8	52	36	+16	52	
5	Nottingham Forest	42	20	8	14	63	43	+20	48	Qualification for the European Cup first round (Note: Nottingham Forest qualified for the European Cup first round as the 1979–80 European Cup winners.)
6	Wolverhampton Wanderers	42	19	9	14	58	47	+11	47	Qualification for the UEFA Cup first round (Note: Wolverhampton Wanderers qualified for the UEFA Cup as the 1979–80 Football League Cup winners.)
7	Aston Villa	42	16	14	12	51	50	+1	46	

Source: World Football
Rules for classification: 1) Points; 2) Goal difference; 3) Goals scored

==== Results by round ====
Round	1	2	3	4	5	6	7	8	9	10	11	12	13	14	15	16	17	18	19	20	21	22	23	24	25	26	27	28	29	30	31	32	33	34	35	36	37	38	39	40	41	42
Ground	A	H	H	A	H	A	A	H	H	A	A	H	A	H	A	H	A	H	A	A	H	A	A	H	A	H	H	A	H	A	H	H	A	H	A	H	A	H	H	A	H	A
Result	W	W	W	W	D	L	D	W	W	D	L	W	L	W	L	L	L	D	L	L	W	W	L	W	W	D	D	L	W	L	W	W	L	W	L	W	D	W	W	D	W	L
Position	4	3	2	1	1	2	1	3	2	1	2	1	2	2	3	4	5	5	7	10	13	10	8	10	9	8	6	6	6	7	6	9	6	9	6	7	9	10	8	7	6	5

Source: Competitive matches
A = Away; H = Home; W = Win; D = Draw; L = Loss; = Leader, 1980-81 European Cup; = 1980-81 UEFA Cup; = 1980–81 Second Division

==== Matches ====
18 August 1979 1	Ipswich Town	0–1	Nottingham Forest	Ipswich
			46' Woodcock	Stadium: Portman Road; Attendance: 27,371

22 August 1979 2	Nottingham Forest	1–0	Stoke City	West Bridgford
	O'Neill 81'			Stadium: City Ground; Attendance: 26,147

25 August 1979 3	Nottingham Forest	4–1	Coventry City	West Bridgford
	Woodcock 18'; McGovern 38'; McGovern 63'; Robertson 68' (pen.)		47' English	Stadium: City Ground; Attendance: 23,025

1 September 1979 4	West Bromwich Albion	1–5	Nottingham Forest	West Bromwich
	Owen 2'		15' Lloyd; 28' Birtles; 43' Birtles; 77' Gray; 81' Birtles	Stadium: The Hawthorns; Attendance: 26,026

8 September 1979 5	Nottingham Forest	0–0	Leeds United	West Bridgford
				Stadium: City Ground; Attendance: 26,914

15 September 1979 6	Norwich City	3–1	Nottingham Forest	Norwich
	Reeves 37'; Fashanu 41'; Robson 57'		82' Woodcock	Stadium: Carrow Road; Attendance: 18,621

22 September 1979 7	Bristol City	1–1	Nottingham Forest	Bristol
	Mann 34'		72' Mills	Stadium: Ashton Gate; Attendance: 22,759

29 September 1979 8	Nottingham Forest	1–0	Liverpool F.C.	West Bridgford
	Birtles 36'			Stadium: City Ground; Attendance: 28,262

6 October 1979 9	Nottingham Forest	3–2	Wolverhampton Wanderers	West Bridgford
	Francis 1'; Robertson 24' (pen.); Birtles 37'		44' Richards; 86' (pen.) P. W. Daniel	Stadium: City Ground; Attendance: 27,569

10 October 1979 10	Stoke City	1–1	Nottingham Forest	Stoke
	Callaghan 62'		Birtles 81'	Stadium: Victoria Ground; Attendance: 28,514

13 October 1979 11	Manchester City	1–0	Nottingham Forest	Moss Side
	Deyna 47'			Stadium: Maine Road; Attendance: 41,683

20 October 1979 12	Nottingham Forest	5–2	Bolton Wanderers	West Bridgford
	Lloyd 6'; Woodcock 18'; Francis 44'; Robertson 52' (pen.); Anderson 67'		Thompson 66'; Morgan 80' (pen.)	Stadium: City Ground; Attendance: 24,564

27 October 1979 13	Tottenham Hotspur	1–0	Nottingham Forest	Tottenham
	Hoddle 3'			Stadium: White Hart Lane; Attendance: 49,038

3 November 1979 14	Nottingham Forest	2–0	Ipswich Town	West Bridgford
	Francis 50'; Francis 87'			Stadium: City Ground; Attendance: 24,593

10 November 1979 15	Southampton F.C.	4–1	Nottingham Forest	Southampton
	Watson 27'; Channon 30'; Boyer 57', 64'		56' Birtles	Stadium: The Dell; Attendance: 22,072

17 November 1979 16	Nottingham Forest	0–1	Brighton & Hove Albion	West Bridgford
			11' Ryan	Stadium: City Ground; Attendance: 25,837

24 November 1979 17	Derby County	4–1	Nottingham Forest	Derby
	Daly 13'; Duncan 15'; Emery 16'; Duncan 77'		47' (pen.) Robertson	Stadium: Baseball Ground; Attendance: 27,729

1 December 1979 18	Nottingham Forest	1–1	Arsenal F.C.	West Bridgford
	Birtles 89'		4' Stapleton	Stadium: City Ground; Attendance: 27,925

8 December 1979 19	Crystal Palace	1–0	Nottingham Forest	Selhurst
	Walsh 42'			Stadium: Selhurst Park; Attendance: 34,782

22 December 1979 21	Manchester United	3–0	Nottingham Forest	Manchester
	Jordan 2'; Jordan 16'; McQueen 23'			Stadium: Old Trafford; Attendance: 54,522

26 December 1979 22	Nottingham Forest	2–1	Aston Villa	West Bridgford
	Robertson 50' (pen.); Bowles 57'		64' Shaw	Stadium: City Ground; Attendance: 30,979

29 December 1979 23	Coventry City	0–3	Nottingham Forest	Coventry
			50' (pen.) Robertson; 66' Robertson; 68' Bowles	Stadium: Highfield Road; Attendance: 24,737

1 January 1980 24	Everton F.C.	1–0	Nottingham Forest	Walton
	Kidd 24'			Stadium: Goodison Park; Attendance: 34,616

12 January 1980 25	Nottingham Forest	3–1	West Bromwich Albion	West Bridgford
	Needham 52'; Francis 56'; Anderson 77'		10' Regis	Stadium: City Ground; Attendance: 27,724

19 January 1980 26	Leeds United	1–2	Nottingham Forest	Leeds
	Connor 15'		45' Birtles; 82' Francis	Stadium: Elland Road; Attendance: 29, 816

9 February 1980 27	Nottingham Forest	0–0	Bristol City	West Bridgford
				Stadium: City Ground; Attendance: 23,421

16 February 1980 20 (Note: Rescheduled from 15 December 1979)	Nottingham Forest	2–2	Middlesbrough F.C.	West Bridgford
	Robertson 62' (pen.); O'Neill 72'		61' Burns; 63' Burns	Stadium: City Ground; Attendance: 28,889

19 February 1980 28	Liverpool F.C.	2–0	Nottingham Forest	Liverpool
	McDermott 78'; R. Kennedy 83'			Stadium: Anfield Road; Attendance: 45,093

23 February 1980 29	Nottingham Forest	4–0	Manchester City	West Bridgford
	Francis 27'; Burns 48'; Francis 56'; Francis 70'			Stadium: City Ground; Attendance: 27,255

1 March 1980 30	Bolton Wanderers	1–0	Nottingham Forest	Bolton
	Whatmore 41'			Stadium: Burnden Park; Attendance: 16,164

11 March 1980 31	Nottingham Forest	4–0	Tottenham Hotspur	West Bridgford
	Burns 70'; Burns 74'; Francis 77'; Francis 83'			Stadium: City Ground; Attendance: 25,633

22 March 1980 33	Nottingham Forest	2–0	Southampton F.C.	West Bridgford
	Robertson 36' (pen.); Birtles 44'			Stadium: City Ground; Attendance: 27,625

29 March 1980 34	Brighton & Hove Albion	1–0	Nottingham Forest	Brighton
	Williams 87'			Stadium: Goldstone Ground; Attendance: 25,128

2 April 1980 35	Nottingham Forest	2–0	Manchester United	West Bridgford
	Robertson 80' (pen.); Birtles 88'		(red card) 80' McIlroy	Stadium: City Ground; Attendance: 31,417; Referee: C Thomas

5 April 1980 36	Aston Villa	3–2	Nottingham Forest	Birmingham
	Bremner 13'; Evans 41'; Lloyd 47' (o.g.)		28' Birtles; 76' Bowyer	Stadium: Villa Park; Attendance: 29,156

19 April 1980 39	Nottingham Forest	1–0	Derby County	West Bridgford
	Gray 42'			Stadium: City Ground; Attendance: 32,366

26 April 1980 40	Middlesbrough F.C.	0–0	Nottingham Forest	Middlesbrough
				Stadium: Ayresome Park; Attendance: 17,021

30 April 1980 41	Nottingham Forest	2–0	Norwich City	Nottingham
	Bond 3' (o.g.); Francis 59'			Stadium: City Ground; Attendance: 21,242

3 May 1980 38 (Note: Match rescheduled from 12 April 1980)	Nottingham Forest	4–0	Crystal Palace	West Bridgford
	Francis 10'; Francis 24'; Lloyd 33'; Robertson 74'			Stadium: City Ground; Attendance: 24,529

5 May 1980 42	Arsenal F.C.	0–0	Nottingham Forest	Islington
				Stadium: Highbury; Attendance: 34,632

9 May 1980 37 (Note: Match rescheduled from 7 April 1980)	Nottingham Forest	1–0	Everton F.C.	West Bridgford
	Anderson 89'			Stadium: City Ground; Attendance: 22,122

12 May 1980 32 (Note: Match rescheduled from 15 March 1980)	Wolverhampton Wanderers	3–1	Nottingham Forest	Wolverhampton
	Hibbit 5' (pen.); Richards 73'; Palmer 82'		69' O'Neill	Stadium: Molineux; Attendance: 22,725

=== League Cup ===
==== Second round ====
29 August 1979 1	Blackburn Rovers	1–1	Nottingham Forest	Blackburn
				Stadium: Ewood Park

5 September 1979 2	Nottingham Forest	6–1	Blackburn Rovers	Nottingham
				Stadium: City Ground

==== Third round ====
25 September 1979	Middlesbrough	1–3	Nottingham Forest	Middlesbrough

==== Fourth round ====
30 October 1979	Bristol City	1–1	Nottingham Forest	Bristol

14 November 1979 replay	Nottingham Forest	3–0	Bristol City	Nottingham
				Stadium: City Ground

==== Quarterfinals ====
4 December 1979	West Ham United	0–0	Nottingham Forest	West Ham

12 December 1979 replay	Nottingham Forest	3–0	West Ham United	Nottingham
				Stadium: City Ground

==== Semifinals ====
22 January 1980 1	Nottingham Forest	1–0	Liverpool F.C.	Nottingham
				Stadium: City Ground; Attendance: 32,234

12 February 1980 2	Liverpool F.C.	1–1	Nottingham Forest	Liverpool
				Stadium: Anfield Road; Attendance: 50,880

==== Final ====
15 March 1980	Nottingham Forest	0–1	Wolverhampton Wanderers	London
15:00 GMT			Gray 67'	Stadium: Wembley Stadium; Attendance: 96,527; Referee: David Richardson (Great Harwood)

=== FA Cup ===
==== Third round ====
5 January 1980	Leeds United	1–4	Nottingham Forest	Leeds
				Stadium: Elland Road

==== Fourth round ====
26 January 1980	Nottingham Forest	0–2	Liverpool F.C.	Nottingham
				Stadium: City Ground; Attendance: 33,277

=== European Cup ===
==== Round of 32 ====
19 September 1979 1	Nottingham Forest (England)	2–0	(Sweden) Öster	Nottingham
	Bowyer 63', 73'	Report		Stadium: City Ground; Attendance: 21,974; Referee: Sotos Afxentiou (Cyprus)

3 October 1979 2	Öster (Sweden)	1–1	(England) Nottingham Forest	Växjö
	Nordgren 52'	Report	Woodcock 79'	Stadium: Värendsvallen; Attendance: 14,772; Referee: Jerzy Kacprzak (Poland)

==== Eightfinals ====
24 October 1979 1	Nottingham Forest (England)	2–0	(Romania) Argeș Pitești	Nottingham
	Woodcock 12'; Birtles 16'	Report		Stadium: City Ground; Attendance: 24,828; Referee: (Norway) Reidar Bjørnestad

7 November 1979 2	Argeș Pitești (Romania)	1–2	(England) Nottingham Forest	Pitești
	Bărbulescu 60' (pen.)	Report	Bowyer 5'; Birtles 23'	Stadium: Stadionul 1 Mai; Attendance: 22,000; Referee: (Spain) Ángel Franco Martínez

==== Quarterfinals ====
5 March 1980 1	Nottingham Forest (England)	0–1	(East Germany) BFC Dynamo	Nottingham
		Report	Riediger 63'	Stadium: City Ground; Attendance: 27,946; Referee: (Belgium) Alexis Ponnet

19 March 1980 2	BFC Dynamo (East Germany)	1–3 (2–3 agg.)	(England) Nottingham Forest	East Berlin
	Terletzki 49' (pen.)	Report	Francis 15', 35'; Robertson 39' (pen.)	Stadium: Friedrich-Ludwig-Jahn-Stadion; Attendance: 30,000; Referee: (France) Alain Delmer

==== Semifinals ====
9 April 1980 1	Nottingham Forest (England)	2–0	(Netherlands) Ajax	Nottingham
	Francis 33'; Robertson 61' (pen.)	Report		Stadium: City Ground; Attendance: 31,244; Referee: (Switzerland) André Daina

23 April 1980 2	Ajax (Netherlands)	1–0 (1–2 agg.)	(England) Nottingham Forest	Amsterdam
	Lerby 65'	Report		Stadium: Olympisch Stadion; Attendance: 54,955; Referee: (Romania) Nicolae Rainea

==== Final ====
28 May 1980	Nottingham Forest (England)	1–0	(West Germany) Hamburger SV	Madrid
20:30 CEST	Robertson 20'	Report MatchCentre		Stadium: Santiago Bernabéu Stadium; Attendance: 51,000; Referee: (Portugal) António Garrido

=== UEFA Super Cup ===
30 January 1980 1	Nottingham Forest (England)	1–0	(Spain) Barcelona	Nottingham
	George 9'	Report		Stadium: City Ground; Attendance: 23,807; Referee: (East Germany) Adolf Prokop

5 February 1980 2	Barcelona (Spain)	1–1	(England) Nottingham Forest	Barcelona
	Roberto 25' (pen.)	Report	Burns 42'	Stadium: Camp Nou; Attendance: 80,000; Referee: (West Germany) Walter Eschweiler

== Statistics ==
=== Players statistics ===
(Note: The statistics for the following players are for their time during 1979–80 season playing for Nottingham Forest. Any stats from a different club during 1979–80 are not included. Includes all competitive matches.)

No.	Pos	Nat	Player	Total		Football League Division One		Football League Cup		FA Cup		European Cup	
No.	Pos	Nat	Player	Apps	Goals	Apps	Goals	Apps	Goals	Apps	Goals	Apps	Goals
	GK	(England) ENG	Shilton	63	-43	42	-43	10	0	2	0	9	0
	DF	(England) ENG	Anderson	61	4	41	3	10	1	2	0	8	0
	DF	(England) ENG	Lloyd	62	4	42	3	9	1	2	0	9	0
	DF	(Scotland) SCO	Burns	51	3	33+1	3	8	0	1	0	8	0
	DF	(Scotland) SCO	Gray	62	4	41	2	10	1	2	1	9	0
	MF	(Northern Ireland) NIR	O'Neill	44	5	27+1	3	8	2	1	0	7	0
	MF	(Scotland) SCO	McGovern	60	2	41	2	8	0	2	0	9	0
	MF	(England) ENG	Bowles	22	2	19	2	0	0	1	0	2	0
	MF	(Scotland) SCO	Robertson	63	19	41+1	11	10	4	2	1	9	3
	FW	(England) ENG	Francis	42	17	30	14	6	0	2	0	4	3
	FW	(England) ENG	Birtles	62	16	42	12	9	1	2	1	9	2
	GK	(England) ENG	Montgomery	0	0	0	0	0	0	0	0	0	0
	FW	(England) ENG	Woodcock	25	11	16	4	5	5	0	0	4	2
	MF	(England) ENG	Mills	16	1	6+4	1	3	0	0	0	3	0
	MF	(Scotland) SCO	O'Hare	12	3	6+1	1	4	2	0	0	1	0
	DF	(England) ENG	Needham	13	1	6+2	1	3	0	1	0	1	0
	MF	(England) ENG	Bowyer	27	7	5+7	1	7	2	2	1	6	3
	MF	(Scotland) SCO	Hartford	3	0	3	0						
	FW	(England) ENG	George	2	0	2	0	0	0	0	0	0	0
	DF	(England) ENG	Gunn	3	0	1+1	0	0	0	0	0	1	0
	GK	(England) ENG	Sutton										
	MF	(Scotland) SCO	Walsh										

- Source: https://www.11v11.com/teams/nottingham-forest/tab/players/season/1980/
