= 1978 Football League Cup final =

1978 League Cup final
- Event: 1977–78 Football League Cup
Nottingham Forest	Liverpool
- Nottingham Forest won after a replay
Nottingham Forest	Liverpool
0	0
- After extra time
- Date: 18 March 1978
- Venue: Wembley Stadium, London
- Referee: Pat Partridge
- Attendance: 100,000

Replay
Nottingham Forest	Liverpool
1	0
- Date: 22 March 1978
- Venue: Old Trafford, Manchester
- Attendance: 54,375

The 1978 Football League Cup final was the eighteenth League Cup final, and was contested between Liverpool and Nottingham Forest. The initial match resulted in a 0–0 draw at Wembley Stadium on 18 March 1978. The replay was four days later at Old Trafford, and saw John Robertson score from the penalty spot after a professional foul by Phil Thompson on John O'Hare, which TV replays confirmed was just outside the penalty area. This was enough to win the cup for Forest, who thus became the first club to achieve a League and League Cup double.

In the latter game, one of his last for Liverpool, stalwart Ian Callaghan received the only booking of his long career with the club.

== Road to Wembley ==
=== Nottingham Forest ===
Forest's route to the final included victories over First Division teams West Ham United, Aston Villa and Leeds United (beating the latter 7–3 on aggregate in the semi-final). They also beat neighbours Notts County.

=== Liverpool ===
Liverpool were drawn at home to First Division teams in their first 3 rounds. They defeated Chelsea by 2 goals to nil in round 2, and Derby County by the same scoreline in round 3. They then drew 2-2 at home in round four against Coventry City, before winning the replay 2-0 at Highfield Road. They then beat Third Division Wrexham 3-1 in the quarter-final at The Racecourse Ground, before edging out Arsenal in a two-legged semi-final, which saw Liverpool winning 2-1 at Anfield and drawing 0-0 at Highbury.

== Match details ==
Nottingham Forest	Liverpool

Nottingham Forest; Red shirts/White shorts/Red socks	0–0 (final score after extra time)	Liverpool; White shirts/Black shorts/White socks
Manager: (England) Brian Clough Team: 1 (England) Chris Woods (GK); 2 (England) Viv Anderson; 3 (England) Frank Clark; 4 (Scotland) John McGovern (c) (substituted off); 5 (England) Larry Lloyd; 6 (Scotland) Kenny Burns; 7 (Northern Ireland) Martin O'Neill; 8 (England) Ian Bowyer; 9 (England) Peter Withe; 10 (England) Tony Woodcock; 11 (Scotland) John Robertson; Substitute: 12 (Scotland) John O'Hare (substituted on) Scorers: None	Half-time: 0–0 Competition: Football League Cup (Final) Date: 15.00 GMT Saturday 18 March 1978 Venue: Wembley Stadium, London Attendance: 100,000 Referee: Pat Partridge Match rules: 90 minutes. 30 minutes extra-time if necessary. Match replayed if scores still level. One named substitute.	Manager: (England) Bob Paisley Team: 1 (England) Ray Clemence (GK); 2 (England) Phil Neal; 3 (England) Tommy Smith; 4 (England) Phil Thompson; 5 (England) Ray Kennedy (substituted off) 91'; 6 (England) Emlyn Hughes (c); 7 (Scotland) Kenny Dalglish; 8 (England) Jimmy Case; 9 (Republic of Ireland) Steve Heighway; 10 (England) Terry McDermott; 11 (England) Ian Callaghan; Substitute: 12 (England) David Fairclough (substituted on) 91' Scorers: None

Source for team line-ups:

== Replay ==
Nottingham Forest	Liverpool

Nottingham Forest; Yellow/Yellow shorts/Yellow socks	1–0 (final score after 90 minutes)	Liverpool; Red shirts/Red shorts/Red socks
Manager: Brian Clough Team: 1 (England) Chris Woods (GK); 2 (England) Viv Anderson; 3 (England) Frank Clark; 4 (Scotland) John O'Hare; 5 (England) Larry Lloyd; 6 (Scotland) Kenny Burns (c); 7 (Northern Ireland) Martin O'Neill; 8 (England) Ian Bowyer; 9 (England) Peter Withe; 10 (England) Tony Woodcock; 11 (Scotland) John Robertson; Substitute; 12 (England) Steve Elliott Scorers: Robertson 54' (pen.)	Half-time: 0–0 Competition: Football League Cup (Final) Date: 19.45 BST, Wednesday, 22 March 1978 Venue: Old Trafford, Manchester Attendance: 54,375 Referee: Pat Partridge Match rules: 90 minutes. 30 minutes extra-time if necessary. Match replayed if scores still level. One named substitute.	Manager: Bob Paisley Team: 1 (England) Ray Clemence (GK); 2 (England) Phil Neal; 3 (England) Tommy Smith; 4 (England) Phil Thompson; 5 (England) Ray Kennedy; 6 (England) Emlyn Hughes (c); 7 (Scotland) Kenny Dalglish; 8 (England) Jimmy Case (substituted off) 64'; 9 (Republic of Ireland) Steve Heighway; 10 (England) Terry McDermott; 11 (England) Ian Callaghan; Substitute; 12 (England) David Fairclough (substituted on) 64' Scorers: None
