= 1977–78 in English football =

Football in England
- Season: 1977–78

Men's football
- First Division: Nottingham Forest
- Second Division: Bolton Wanderers
- Third Division: Wrexham
- Fourth Division: Watford
- FA Cup: Ipswich Town
- Anglo-Scottish Cup: Bristol City
- League Cup: Nottingham Forest
- Charity Shield: Shared between Liverpool and Manchester United

The 1977–78 season was the 98th season of competitive football in England.

== National teams ==
Ron Greenwood, general manager of West Ham United and team manager until 1974, accepted an offer to become temporary manager of the England national team in August 1977, initially for three matches only. In November, England beat Italy 2–0 at Wembley Stadium in their final World Cup qualifying game, but failed to qualify for next summer's final tournament after Italy won against Luxembourg in December.

Despite their failure to qualify for the World Cup, Ron Greenwood was appointed England manager on a four-and-a-half-year contract. His first match as permanent England manager ended in a 2–1 defeat to West Germany in Munich in February 1978. In April, a goal from Kevin Keegan gave England a 1–1 draw against Brazil at Wembley. Steve Coppell scored the only goal in England's 1–0 win over Scotland at Hampden Park in May. England won the Home Championship with a 100% record.

== UEFA competitions ==
Liverpool won the 1977 European Super Cup by completing a 7–1 aggregate win over Hamburg; they won the second leg 6–0 after drawing 1–1 in the first leg. Former Liverpool striker Kevin Keegan was in the Hamburg side. They went on to beat Club Brugge 1–0 in the 1978 European Cup Final at Wembley Stadium thanks to a Kenny Dalglish goal, thus retaining the European Cup.

Manchester United were thrown out of the European Cup Winners' Cup on owing to the behaviour of their fans in the away leg of their tie against St. Étienne. They were reinstated a week later, but had to play the second leg at least 300 km from Manchester, at Plymouth Argyle's Home Park ground.

== FA Cup ==
Bobby Robson led Ipswich Town to victory in the FA Cup, winning the final 1–0 against Arsenal at Wembley Stadium. Roger Osborne scored the only goal of the game as Ipswich won the FA Cup for the first time. Arsenal and Ipswich reached the final after semi-final victories over Orient and West Bromwich Albion respectively. Second Division Orient reached the semi-final with a 2–1 replay victory over Middlesbrough.

Northern Premier League side Blyth Spartans beat Second Division Stoke City 3–2 away to become the first non-league club to reach the fifth round of the FA Cup in 29 years. They were seconds away from reaching the quarter-finals, but Wrexham equalised from a retaken corner kick before winning 2–1 in the replay. Wrexham had beaten Newcastle United 4–1 in a replay earlier in the competition.

== League Cup ==
Nottingham Forest won the League Cup after victory over Liverpool in the replay.

== Football League ==
=== First Division ===
Nottingham Forest won the First Division title with just three league defeats all season, one season after promotion. In doing so, their manager Brian Clough became only the second manager in English football to win the First Division title with different clubs. Clough's men also won the Football League Cup. It was the first time that Forest had won either trophy.

Liverpool finished runners-up in the league and retained the European Cup. Everton, Manchester City and Arsenal completed the top five. West Bromwich Albion finished sixth and sealed a UEFA Cup place, having continued to impress in the First Division following the mid-season resignation of Ronnie Allen as manager and the appointment of Ron Atkinson as his successor.

Manchester United broke the British transfer fee record on 9 February by paying Leeds United £495,000 for Scottish defender Gordon McQueen but finished a disappointing 10th, having sacked Tommy Docherty in the close season following the revelation of his affair with the wife of the club's physiotherapist. His replacement was former QPR boss Dave Sexton.

Leicester City and Newcastle United were bracketed together on 22 points after a terrible First Division campaign, Newcastle's relegation coming just one season after they had finished fifth in the league and qualified for the UEFA Cup. They were joined in the drop zone by West Ham United, the 1975 FA Cup winners, who kept faith in manager John Lyall and managed to hold on to key players Billy Bonds and Trevor Brooking.

Pos	Team	Pld	W	D	L	GF	GA	GD	Pts	Qualification or relegation
1	Nottingham Forest (C)	42	25	14	3	69	24	+45	64	Qualification for the European Cup first round (Note: Liverpool qualified for the European Cup first round as the 1977–78 European Cup winners.)
2	Liverpool	42	24	9	9	65	34	+31	57	Qualification for the European Cup first round
3	Everton	42	22	11	9	76	45	+31	55	Qualification for the UEFA Cup first round
4	Manchester City	42	20	12	10	74	51	+23	52	Qualification for the UEFA Cup first round
5	Arsenal	42	21	10	11	60	37	+23	52	Qualification for the UEFA Cup first round
6	West Bromwich Albion	42	18	14	10	62	53	+9	50	Qualification for the UEFA Cup first round
7	Coventry City	42	18	12	12	75	62	+13	48	
8	Aston Villa	42	18	10	14	57	42	+15	46	
9	Leeds United	42	18	10	14	63	53	+10	46	
10	Manchester United	42	16	10	16	67	63	+4	42	
11	Birmingham City	42	16	9	17	55	60	−5	41	
12	Derby County	42	14	13	15	54	59	−5	41	
13	Norwich City	42	11	18	13	52	66	−14	40	
14	Middlesbrough	42	12	15	15	42	54	−12	39	
15	Wolverhampton Wanderers	42	12	12	18	51	64	−13	36	
16	Chelsea	42	11	14	17	46	69	−23	36	
17	Bristol City	42	11	13	18	49	53	−4	35	
18	Ipswich Town	42	11	13	18	47	61	−14	35	Qualification for the European Cup Winners' Cup first round (Note: Ipswich Town qualified for the European Cup Winners' Cup as the 1977–78 FA Cup winners.)
19	Queens Park Rangers	42	9	15	18	47	64	−17	33	
20	West Ham United (R)	42	12	8	22	52	69	−17	32	Relegation to the Second Division
21	Newcastle United (R)	42	6	10	26	42	78	−36	22	Relegation to the Second Division
22	Leicester City (R)	42	5	12	25	26	70	−44	22	Relegation to the Second Division

Source: World Football
Rules for classification: 1) Points; 2) Goal difference; 3) Goals scored
(C) Champions; (R) Relegated

=== Second Division ===
After narrowly missing out on promotion for the last two seasons, Bolton Wanderers finally ended their lengthy absence from the First Division by clinching the Second Division title. Southampton finished a point behind them in second place, ending their four-year absence from the First Division, during which they had won the FA Cup in 1976. Tottenham Hotspur clinched the final promotion place on goal difference, their advantage over fourth-placed Brighton being assisted by a 9-0 scoreline over Bristol Rovers in October, during which striker Colin Lee had scored four goals on his club debut.

For much of the season it had been a four-horse race at the top of the Second Division, with fifth placed Blackburn Rovers finishing eleven points behind the leading pack.

Hull City were relegated to the third tier for the first time since 1966, after a campaign in which four different managers took charge of the team. Mansfield Town were relegated straight back to the Third Division after a year, never looking like they would survive in their first-ever season at this level, though a late fightback after the appointment of veteran manager Billy Bingham at least saw them avoid last place. Blackpool were the final relegated side; they had been safely in mid-table for much of the campaign, but a disastrous end to the season combined with a host of other results going against them sent them down to the third tier for the first time ever. They would not return to this level until 2007.

Pos	Team	Pld	W	D	L	GF	GA	GD	Pts	Relegation
1	Bolton Wanderers (C, P)	42	24	10	8	63	33	+30	58	Promotion to the First Division
2	Southampton (P)	42	22	13	7	70	39	+31	57	Promotion to the First Division
3	Tottenham Hotspur (P)	42	20	16	6	83	49	+34	56	Promotion to the First Division
4	Brighton & Hove Albion	42	22	12	8	63	38	+25	56	
5	Blackburn Rovers	42	16	13	13	56	60	−4	45	
6	Sunderland	42	14	16	12	67	59	+8	44	
7	Stoke City	42	16	10	16	53	49	+4	42	
8	Oldham Athletic	42	13	16	13	54	58	−4	42	
9	Crystal Palace	42	13	15	14	50	47	+3	41	
10	Fulham	42	14	13	15	49	49	0	41	
11	Burnley	42	15	10	17	56	64	−8	40	
12	Sheffield United	42	16	8	18	62	73	−11	40	
13	Luton Town	42	14	10	18	54	52	+2	38	
14	Orient	42	10	18	14	43	49	−6	38	
15	Notts County	42	11	16	15	54	62	−8	38	
16	Millwall	42	12	14	16	49	57	−8	38	
17	Charlton Athletic	42	13	12	17	55	68	−13	38	
18	Bristol Rovers	42	13	12	17	61	77	−16	38	
19	Cardiff City	42	13	12	17	51	71	−20	38	
20	Blackpool (R)	42	12	13	17	59	60	−1	37	Relegation to the Third Division
21	Mansfield Town (R)	42	10	11	21	49	69	−20	31	Relegation to the Third Division
22	Hull City (R)	42	8	12	22	34	52	−18	28	Relegation to the Third Division

Rules for classification: 1) Points; 2) Goal difference; 3) Goals scored
(C) Champions; (P) Promoted; (R) Relegated

=== Third Division ===
Wrexham won the Third Division title to clinch a place in the Second Division. They were joined by Cambridge United and Preston North End. Peterborough United, who had yet to progress beyond this level of the league, missed out on promotion on goal difference. Chester, another club with a similar track record in the league, finished two points short of the promotion places.

Portsmouth, the 1939 FA Cup winners and with two league titles to their name from the early postwar years, finished bottom of the Third Division to fall into the Fourth Division for the first time, and their very existence was also threatened by large debts. Hereford United, Bradford City and Port Vale also went down.

Pos	Team	Pld	W	D	L	GF	GA	GD	Pts	Promotion or relegation
1	Wrexham (C, P)	46	23	15	8	78	45	+33	61	Cup Winners' Cup first round and promotion to the Second Division (Note: Wrexham qualified for the European Cup Winners' Cup as the Welsh Cup winners.)
2	Cambridge United (P)	46	23	12	11	72	51	+21	58	Promotion to the Second Division
3	Preston North End (P)	46	20	16	10	63	38	+25	56	Promotion to the Second Division
4	Peterborough United	46	20	16	10	47	33	+14	56	
5	Chester	46	16	22	8	59	56	+3	54	
6	Walsall	46	18	17	11	61	50	+11	53	
7	Gillingham	46	15	20	11	67	60	+7	50	
8	Colchester United	46	15	18	13	55	44	+11	48	
9	Chesterfield	46	17	14	15	58	49	+9	48	
10	Swindon Town	46	16	16	14	67	60	+7	48	
11	Shrewsbury Town	46	16	15	15	63	57	+6	47	
12	Tranmere Rovers	46	16	15	15	57	52	+5	47	
13	Carlisle United	46	14	19	13	59	59	0	47	
14	Sheffield Wednesday	46	15	16	15	50	52	−2	46	
15	Bury	46	13	19	14	62	56	+6	45	
16	Lincoln City	46	15	15	16	53	61	−8	45	
17	Exeter City	46	15	14	17	49	59	−10	44	
18	Oxford United	46	13	14	19	64	67	−3	40	
19	Plymouth Argyle	46	11	17	18	61	68	−7	39	
20	Rotherham United	46	13	13	20	51	68	−17	39	
21	Port Vale (R)	46	8	20	18	46	67	−21	36	Relegation to the Fourth Division
22	Bradford City (R)	46	12	10	24	56	86	−30	34	Relegation to the Fourth Division
23	Hereford United (R)	46	9	14	23	34	60	−26	32	Relegation to the Fourth Division
24	Portsmouth (R)	46	7	17	22	41	75	−34	31	Relegation to the Fourth Division

Source: rsssf.com
(C) Champions; (P) Promoted; (R) Relegated

=== Fourth Division ===
Graham Taylor guided Watford to the Fourth Division title by an 11-point margin to repeat the promotion success he had achieved at Lincoln City two seasons earlier. Southend United finished second, while John Toshack kicked off his managerial career by taking Swansea City to promotion just weeks after being appointed. Brentford clinched the final promotion place, with Aldershot missing out on promotion by two points.

Wimbledon played their first season in the Football League, replacing Workington.

Southport, having finished second-from-bottom for the third season in succession, were voted out of the Football League and replaced by Wigan Athletic. This would ultimately prove the final occasion where a club failed to earn re-election to the League, and the same 92 clubs would continue to make up its membership until 1987, by which point automatic promotion and relegation between the League and the Football Conference had been introduced.

Pos	Team	Pld	W	D	L	GF	GA	GD	Pts	Promotion or relegation
1	Watford (C, P)	46	30	11	5	85	38	+47	71	Promotion to the Third Division
2	Southend United (P)	46	25	10	11	66	39	+27	60	Promotion to the Third Division
3	Swansea City (P)	46	23	10	13	87	47	+40	56	Promotion to the Third Division
4	Brentford (P)	46	21	14	11	86	54	+32	56	Promotion to the Third Division
5	Aldershot	46	19	16	11	67	47	+20	54	
6	Grimsby Town	46	21	11	14	57	51	+6	53	
7	Barnsley	46	18	14	14	61	49	+12	50	
8	Reading	46	18	14	14	55	52	+3	50	
9	Torquay United	46	16	15	15	57	56	+1	47	
10	Northampton Town	46	17	13	16	63	68	−5	47	
11	Huddersfield Town	46	15	15	16	63	55	+8	45	
12	Doncaster Rovers	46	14	17	15	52	65	−13	45	
13	Wimbledon	46	14	16	16	66	67	−1	44	
14	Scunthorpe United	46	14	16	16	50	55	−5	44	
15	Crewe Alexandra	46	15	14	17	50	69	−19	44	
16	Newport County	46	16	11	19	65	73	−8	43	
17	Bournemouth	46	14	15	17	41	51	−10	43	
18	Stockport County	46	16	10	20	56	56	0	42	
19	Darlington	46	14	13	19	52	59	−7	41	
20	Halifax Town	46	10	21	15	52	62	−10	41	
21	Hartlepool United	46	15	7	24	51	84	−33	37	Re-elected
22	York City	46	12	12	22	50	69	−19	36	Re-elected
23	Southport (R)	46	6	19	21	52	76	−24	31	Failed re-election and demoted to the Northern Premier League
24	Rochdale	46	8	8	30	43	85	−42	24	Re-elected

(C) Champions; (P) Promoted; (R) Relegated

=== Top goalscorers ===
First Division

- Bob Latchford (Everton) – 30 goals

Second Division

- Bob Hatton (Blackpool) – 22 goals

Third Division

- Alex Bruce (Preston North End) – 27 goals

Fourth Division

- Alan Curtis (Swansea City), Steve Phillips (Brentford) – 32 goals

== Non-league football ==
Competition	Winners
Isthmian League	Enfield
Northern Premier League	Boston United
Southern League	Bath City
FA Trophy	Altrincham
FA Vase	Newcastle Blue Star

== Awards ==
Football Writers' Association

- FWA Footballer of the Year – Kenny Burns, Nottingham Forest

Professional Footballers' Association

- PFA Players' Player of the Year – Peter Shilton, Nottingham Forest
- PFA Young Player of the Year – Tony Woodcock, Nottingham Forest
- PFA Merit Award – Bill Shankly

== Famous debutants ==
3 September 1977: Cyrille Regis, 19-year-old French Guiana born striker, makes his debut for West Bromwich Albion against Middlesbrough at The Hawthorns in the First Division, scoring in a 2–1 win.

3 September 1977: Russell Osman, 18-year-old defender, makes his debut for Ipswich Town in the 1–0 First Division win over Chelsea at Portman Road.

14 January 1978: Alan Brazil, 18-year-old Scottish striker, makes his debut for Ipswich Town as a substitute in the 2-1 First Division defeat by Manchester United at Portman Road.

28 January 1978: Craig Johnston, 17-year-old Australian midfielder, makes his debut for Middlesbrough in the 3-2 F.A Cup 4th Round win over Everton at Ayresome Park.

18 March 1978: Alvin Martin, 19-year-old defender, makes his debut as a substitute for West Ham United in the 4-1 First Division defeat by Aston Villa at Villa Park.

11 April 1978: Paul Goddard, 18-year-old striker, makes his debut as a substitute for Queen's Park Rangers in the 2-1 First Division win over Arsenal at Loftus Road.

15 April 1978: Terry Butcher, 19-year-old defender, makes his debut for Ipswich Town in the 1–0 First Division defeat by Everton at Goodison Park.

== Deaths ==
- 30 August 1977 - Alf Young, 71, played 283 league games in defence for Huddersfield Town between 1929 and 1939 and was capped nine times for England before his career was cut short by the war. After the war, he managed three Danish club sides and took charge of the Danish national side in 1956.
- 23 October 1977 - Dick Crawshaw, 79, played 66 league at inside-forward for Manchester City, Halifax Town and Nelson between 1919 and 1924.
- 29 November 1977 - Wilfred Milne, 78, spent his whole career as a full-back with Swansea between 1920 and 1937, making a club record 586 league appearances for the Swans.
- 27 December 1977 - James Marshall, 69, began his career with Rangers in his native Scotland in 1925 and scored 138 league goals before his transfer south of the border to Arsenal in 1934. However, he played just four league games for the Gunners before he moved to West Ham United the following year, scoring 14 goals in 59 league games before retiring in 1937. He was capped three times by Scotland.
- 22 February 1978 - Jack Taylor, 64, played 201 league games as a full-back for Wolverhampton Wanderers, Norwich City and Hull City between 1931 and 1950, his career being disrupted by the war. He then managed non-league Weymouth before being appointed to QPR in 1952, serving at Loftus Road for seven years despite failing to win them promotion from the third tier of the English league. He was then recruited to Leeds United but they were relegated and he was dismissed in March 1961 to be succeeded by Don Revie.
- 23 March 1978 – Dave Wiggett, 20, Hartlepool United defender who was killed in a car crash.
- 4 April 1978 – Tony Leighton, 38, former Doncaster Rovers, Barnsley, Huddersfield Town and Bradford City striker, who died from motor neurone disease.
- 25 April 1978 - Harry Griffiths, 47, who served Swansea for most of the last three decades of his life, was the club's assistant manager when he died of a heart attack during the game at Vetch Field in which they clinched promotion to the Third Division. He made 422 appearances in the league as a full-back between 1949 and 1964, scoring an impressive (for a defender) 72 goals. He returned to the club as coach in 1967 and was promoted to the manager's seat in 1975, becoming assistant manager weeks before his death on the appointment of John Toshack as player-manager.
- 15 June 1978 – Alan Groves, 29, Blackpool midfielder who died as a result of a heart attack. He had previously played for five other clubs, most notably Oldham Athletic.
