= 1979 Football League Cup final =

1979 League Cup final
- The match programme cover
- Event: 1978–79 Football League Cup
Nottingham Forest	Southampton
3	2
- Date: 17 March 1979
- Venue: Wembley Stadium, London
- Referee: Peter Reeves (Leicester)
- Attendance: 96,952

The 1979 Football League Cup final took place on 17 March 1979 at Wembley Stadium. It was the nineteenth Football League Cup final and the thirteenth to be played at Wembley. It was contested between Nottingham Forest and Southampton. Forest were the hot favourites to win being the holders of the League Cup and the reigning First Division champions. The match finished 3–2 to Forest. Forest's goals came from Garry Birtles (2) and Tony Woodcock. Southampton's goals came from David Peach and Nick Holmes.

== Match details ==
Nottingham Forest	Southampton

Nottingham Forest; Red shirts/White shorts/Red socks	3–2 (final score after 90 minutes)	Southampton; Yellow shirts/Blue shorts/Yellow socks
Manager: (England) Brian Clough Team: 1 (England) Peter Shilton (GK); 2 (England) Colin Barrett; 3 (England) Frank Clark; 4 (Scotland) John McGovern (c); 5 (England) Larry Lloyd; 6 (England) David Needham; 7 (Northern Ireland) Martin O'Neill; 8 (Scotland) Archie Gemmill; 9 (England) Garry Birtles; 10 (England) Tony Woodcock; 11 (Scotland) John Robertson; Substitute: 12 (England) Ian Bowyer Scorers: Birtles 51', 79'; Woodcock 83'	Half-time: 0–1 Competition: Football League Cup (Final) Date: 15.00 GMT Saturday 17 March 1979 Venue: Wembley Stadium, London Attendance: 96,952 Referee: Peter Reeves Match rules: 90 minutes. 30 minutes extra-time if necessary. Match replayed if scores still level. One named substitute.	Manager: (England) Lawrie McMenemy Team: 1 (England) Terry Gennoe (GK); 2 (Socialist Federal Republic of Yugoslavia) Ivan Golac; 3 (England) David Peach; 4 (England) Steve Williams; 5 (Northern Ireland) Chris Nicholl; 6 (England) Malcolm Waldron; 7 (England) Alan Ball (c); 8 (England) Phil Boyer; 9 (Republic of Ireland) Austin Hayes (substituted off) 83'; 10 (England) Nick Holmes; 11 (England) Terry Curran; Substitute: 12 (England) Tony Sealy (substituted on) 83' Scorers: Peach 16'; Holmes 88'

Source for team line-ups:

== Road to Wembley ==
=== Nottingham Forest ===
Forest began their defence of the competition with a replayed victory over Oldham Athletic, before a 5–0 win at Oxford United. That set up a clash with fellow First Division side Everton, and Forest won 3–2 at Goodison Park. A quarter-final win over Brighton & Hove Albion set up the semi-final with Third Division side Watford. Forest won the 1st leg at home 3–1, and the 2nd leg was scoreless, and thus Forest qualified for their second successive final.

=== Southampton ===
Southampton began their run with wins over First Division Birmingham City and Derby County. In the fourth round they needed a replay to beat Fourth Division side Reading; Southampton then defeated Manchester City 2–1 in the quarter-final. In the first leg of their semi-final with Leeds United they drew 2–2 away, before a 1–0 second leg victory.
