= Colin Barrett (footballer) =

English footballer (born 1952)

Personal information
- Date of birth: 3 August 1952 (age 74)
- Place of birth: Stockport, England
- Height: 5 ft 11 in (1.80 m)
- Position: Full back

Youth career
- Cheadle Heath Nomads

Senior career*
Years	Team	Apps	(Gls)
1970–1976	Manchester City	53	(0)
1976–1980	Nottingham Forest	69	(4)
1980–1981	Swindon Town	3	(0)
1981–?	Andover		
Total		123	(4)

Managerial career
- Southwell City
- * Club domestic league appearances and goals

Colin Barrett (born 3 August 1952) is an English former association football defender. He played 163 competitive senior games from 1972 to 1980 with Manchester City, Nottingham Forest and Swindon Town. At Forest he was part of a team that won seven honours including the 1977–78 Football League First Division, the 1978–79 European Cup and the Football League Cup in both those seasons. The month after his 26th birthday and 10 days after scoring against Liverpool in the European Cup he damaged knee ligaments. He never fully recovered only playing 12 further competitive games in senior football. The last of those was in the same month as having turned 28.

== Playing career ==
=== Manchester City ===
Barrett was born in the Cheadle Heath district of Stockport. On leaving school he took a job at the Hawker Siddeley Aircraft Factory. In May 1970 he signed for nearby Manchester City as a 17-year-old apprentice from his local side Cheadle Heath Nomads. He had been with City for four months previously as an amateur. City had spotted him playing for Cheshire Youths.

After playing well in the reserves, he earned his first-team debut aged 20 after two games of the 1972/73 season. He played instead of the injured Tony Book as City beat Norwich City 3–0 at home on 19 August 1972. A versatile defender, he later played at centre-back that season covering for the injured Tommy Booth. He played in both legs of the 1973-74 Football League Cup semi-final win against Plymouth Argyle. However he was overlooked in the final defeat by Wolverhampton Wanderers with the more experienced Glyn Pardoe selected instead. Barrett featured in the late season derby game in which Manchester United were relegated.

His last game for Manchester City was at Leicester City on 31 January 1976. In the three and a half season since his first team debut he played in 65 competitive Manchester City first team games (53 in the league). His only City goal came when beating Scunthorpe United 6–0 at home on 10 September in the 1974-75 Football League Cup.

=== Nottingham Forest ===
Aged 23 he dropped down a division to the second tier joining Brian Clough's Nottingham Forest on loan. He debuted on 13 March 1976 in the 1–0 home win against Fulham. Barrett completed his transfer in April 1976 for a £29,000 fee. He played in 10 league games for Forest before the end of that season.

Barrett later said of Clough, "His man-management was quite straightforward. He said: "If I thought you could play you would be in midfield so you are a full-back. When you get the ball you give it to that fella on the wing because he can play." He expected his defenders to defend, his centre-forwards to score goals and his midfielders to create."

At the end of the 1976-77 Football League Second Division Forest were promoted to the top flight. Like at Manchester City though Barrett had not fully cemented himself as a first team regular at this stage. He played in 13 league games in the promotion campaign scoring twice. He scored two goals that season in Clough and Peter Taylor's Forest breakthrough trophy success, the 1976–77 Anglo-Scottish Cup final 5-1 aggregate win against Orient.

Barrett's peak season was that of Forest's return to the top flight. Aged 25 Barrett now established himself as a first team regular. He played in 35 of Forest's league games as they won the 1977-78 Football League First Division. Forest also won the 1977-78 Football League Cup beating Liverpool in a final replay. Barrett again played in both legs of the semi-final win, this time against Leeds United. Like at Manchester City he missed out in the final this time due to a stress fracture with Frank Clark playing at left-back instead. Forest started an unbeaten league run that carried over into the next season lasting 42 matches.

On 12 August he and Forest beat Ipswich Town 5–0 in the 1978 FA Charity Shield. On 13 September in the 1978-79 European Cup Barrett scored the second goal in the 2–0 home leg win in the first round against Liverpool. In the 86th minute Barrett drove home a right foot volley of a knockdown by Tony Woodcock.

10 days later on 23 September 1978 playing in the 2–2 home draw against Middlesbrough he suffered a life altering knee ligament injury. He had turned 26 the month before. He listened to the 0-0 European return tie at Anfield from his hospital bed. He only played 12 further senior competitive games in his career the last of which was less than two years after the Boro game. He made a comeback to the Forest first team in March. He played seven further competitive games for Forest before in April his knee went again. In these games he played in the 1979 Football League Cup Final 3–2 win against Southampton. He also played in drawn games as Forest eliminated Grasshopper Club Zürich and F.C. Koln en route to winning the 1979 European Cup Final. Barrett's injury prevented him being considered for the final.

In 1979/80 he only played for Forest in non-competitive games. He played in 93 competitive games (scoring 8 goals) and 128 first team games (scoring 11 goals) in total for Forest.

=== Swindon Town ===
Aged 27 he moved to Swindon Town in June 1980. He stayed one season making 5 competitive appearances for them (2 in the League Cup then 3 in the league), all between 9 and 23 August. Aged 28 he dropped out of senior football in May 1981. He next joined non-league Andover.

== Managerial career ==
Following his playing career, Barrett managed Southwell City.

== Outside football ==
He worked at The Crown pub in Southwell and then made snooker tables. He then settled into working as a self-employed painter and decorator. His wife Sue is a school teacher with whom he has three children.

== Honours ==
Nottingham Forest

- Football League First Division: 1977–78
- Football League Second Division promotion: 1976–77
- Football League Cup: 1978–79
- FA Charity Shield: 1978
- Anglo-Scottish Cup: 1976–77
- European Cup: 1978–79
