= 1977–78 FA Trophy =

1977-78 FA Trophy
FA Challenge Trophy

Tournament details
- Country: England; Wales
- Teams: 235

Final positions
- Champions: Altrincham
- Runners-up: Leatherhead

The 1977–78 FA Trophy was the ninth season of the FA Trophy.

== Preliminary round ==
=== Ties ===
Tie	Home team	Score	Away team
1	Accrington Stanley	5-0	Belper Town
2	Alton Town	1-0	Andover
3	Armitage	0-2	Enderby Town
4	Arnold	2-4	Boston
5	Aveley	0-2	Crawley Town
6	Bacup Borough	2-1	Bridlington Trinity
7	Barnstaple Town	2-0	Bridgwater Town
8	Barry Town	1-1	Ferndale Athletic
9	Bedworth United	2-1	Darlaston
10	Bilston	0-2	Hednesford Town
11	Bognor Regis Town	4-1	Corinthian-Casuals
12	Bootle	2-2	Colwyn Bay
13	Bromley	3-1	Canterbury City
14	Cambridge City	6-3	Dunstable
15	Cheshunt	4-2	Finchley
16	Cinderford Town	2-2	Clevedon
17	Clapton	2-3	Hampton
18	Dawlish Town	0-1	Glastonbury
19	Fareham Town	1-1	Oxford City
20	Frome Town	2-3	Gloucester City
21	Harlow Town	1-0	Hertford Town
22	Harwich & Parkeston	0-0	Lowestoft Town
23	Louth United	3-0	Eastwood Town
24	Moor Green	0-1	Dudley Town
25	Oswestry Town	0-0	Eastwood Hanley
26	Retford Town	0-1	Emley
27	Sheppey United	1-1	Ramsgate
28	Sittingbourne	0-2	Harrow Borough
29	Stowmarket Town	4-2	Letchworth Garden City
30	Sully	2-4	Llanelli
31	Sutton Coldfield Town	1-1	Heanor Town
32	Taunton Town	1-1	Dorchester Town
33	Thackley	2-2	Skelmersdale United
34	Tonbridge	1-1	Lewes
35	Trowbridge Town	1-0	Poole Town
36	Walton & Hersham	2-1	Hornchurch
37	Ware	1-0	Chesham United
38	Wellingborough Town	3-2	Lye Town
39	Welton Rovers	2-1	Mangotsfield United
40	Westland-Yeovil	0-1	Bridport
41	Weston super Mare	2-1	Shepton Mallet Town
42	Wisbech Town	1-1	Corby Town
43	Witney Town	2-1	Maidenhead United
44	Wokingham Town	1-2	Salisbury

=== Replays ===
Tie	Home team	Score	Away team
8	Ferndale Athletic	1-0	Barry Town
12	Colwyn Bay	2-3	Bootle
16	Clevedon	2-1	Cinderford Town
19	Oxford City	2-2	Fareham Town
22	Harwich & Parkeston	2-2	Lowestoft Town
25	Eastwood Hanley	2-1	Oswestry Town
27	Ramsgate	0-0	Sheppey United
31	Heanor Town	3-1	Sutton Coldfield Town
32	Dorchester Town	2-0	Taunton Town
33	Skelmersdale United	0-4	Thackley
34	Lewes	0-0	Tonbridge
42	Corby Town	1-0	Wisbech Town

=== 2nd replays ===
Tie	Home team	Score	Away team
19	Fareham Town	4-3	Oxford City
22	Harwich & Parkeston	3-4	Lowestoft Town
27	Sheppey United	2-1	Ramsgate
34	Tonbridge	5-0	Lewes

== First qualifying round ==
=== Ties ===
Tie	Home team	Score	Away team
1	A P Leamington	0-0	Alvechurch
2	Accrington Stanley	0-0	Durham City
3	Alfreton Town	0-5	Boston
4	Ashford Town (Kent)	1-1	Tonbridge
5	Barnet	2-4	Carshalton Athletic
6	Bideford	2-1	Trowbridge Town
7	Billingham Synthonia	2-1	Bacup Borough
8	Bognor Regis Town	1-0	Southall & Ealing Borough
9	Boreham Wood	0-0	Salisbury
10	Bridgend Town	2-0	Ferndale Athletic
11	Bromley	1-1	Folkestone & Shepway
12	Cheshunt	3-0	Gorleston
13	Clevedon	0-1	Ton Pentre
14	Corby Town	0-0	Worksop Town
15	Crawley Town	3-2	Alton Town
16	Croydon	2-1	Basingstoke Town
17	Darwen	2-3	Shildon
18	Dorchester Town	0-1	Weston super Mare
19	Droylsden	5-1	Nelson
20	Dudley Town	0-0	Heanor Town
21	Dulwich Hamlet	3-1	Medway
22	Enderby Town	2-0	Spalding United
23	Fareham Town	0-1	Harrow Borough
24	Ferryhill Athletic	2-3	Horden Colliery Welfare
25	Formby	0-1	Ashton United
26	Frickley Athletic	1-1	Whitley Bay
27	Glastonbury	1-6	Barnstaple Town
28	Gloucester City	2-3	Paulton Rovers
29	Hayes	1-1	Kingstonian
30	Hednesford Town	4-0	Tamworth
31	Highgate United	1-2	Milton Keynes City
32	Horsham	1-0	Hampton
33	Ilford	2-0	Leytonstone
34	Kirkby Town	2-0	Rhyl
35	Leek Town	4-0	Hyde United
36	Llanelli	0-2	Cheltenham Town
37	Long Eaton United	0-1	Ilkeston Town
38	Louth United	0-2	Sutton Town
39	Lowestoft Town	2-2	Barking
40	Middlewich Athletic	0-1	Thackley
41	Mossley	1-3	Witton Albion
42	Nantwich Town	2-0	New Mills{1}
43	Netherfield	3-1	Evenwood Town
44	New Brighton Rakers	1-0	Burscough
45	North Shields	1-1	Emley
46	Penrith	0-2	Great Harwood
47	Prestwich Heys	1-3	Horwich R M I
48	Radcliffe Borough	3-3	Buxton
49	Sheppey United	0-1	Gravesend & Northfleet
50	St Albans City	1-2	Wembley
51	St Helens Town	4-1	Eastwood Hanley
52	Stalybridge Celtic	3-2	Bootle
53	Stourbridge	1-1	Redditch United
54	Stowmarket Town	1-1	Harlow Town
55	Tilbury	0-1	Walthamstow Avenue
56	Tow Law Town	2-0	Rossendale United
57	Ware	2-2	Cambridge City
58	Waterlooville	2-0	Metropolitan Police
59	Wealdstone	1-1	Walton & Hersham
60	Wellingborough Town	3-0	Bedworth United
61	Welton Rovers	1-1	Bridport
62	West Auckland Town	0-2	South Bank
63	Witney Town	0-2	Woking

=== Replays ===
Tie	Home team	Score	Away team
1	Alvechurch	0-2	A P Leamington
2	Durham City	1-0	Accrington Stanley
4	Tonbridge	4-1	Ashford Town (Kent)
9	Salisbury	1-0	Boreham Wood
11	Folkestone & Shepway	2-3	Bromley
14	Worksop Town	0-1	Corby Town
20	Heanor Town	1-2	Dudley Town
26	Whitley Bay	1-2	Frickley Athletic
29	Kingstonian	4-3	Hayes
39	Barking	2-1	Lowestoft Town
45	Emley	3-1	North Shields
48	Buxton	3-0	Radcliffe Borough
53	Redditch United	5-3	Stourbridge
54	Harlow Town	1-0	Stowmarket Town
57	Cambridge City	3-1	Ware
59	Walton & Hersham	1-2	Wealdstone
61	Bridport	3-1	Welton Rovers

== Second qualifying round ==
=== Ties ===
Tie	Home team	Score	Away team
1	A P Leamington	3-1	Corby Town
2	Barking	3-4	Harlow Town
3	Barnstaple Town	1-1	Weston super Mare
4	Barrow	2-1	Durham City
5	Boston	0-0	Dudley Town
6	Bridport	0-2	Waterlooville
7	Carshalton Athletic	0-1	Harrow Borough
8	Cheshunt	1-3	Walthamstow Avenue
9	Emley	4-0	Thackley
10	Gravesend & Northfleet	2-0	Croydon
11	Hednesford Town	0-0	Leek Town
12	Horden Colliery Welfare	1-1	Great Harwood
13	Horwich R M I	2-0	Droylsden
14	Ilford	1-1	Cambridge City
15	Ilkeston Town	1-4	Stalybridge Celtic
16	Kingstonian	4-1	Crawley Town
17	Nantwich Town	2-5	Ashton United
18	Netherfield	2-0	Billingham Synthonia
19	Paulton Rovers	2-3	Bridgend Town
20	Redditch United	2-3	Enderby Town
21	Salisbury	0-1	Cheltenham Town
22	Shildon	1-3	Frickley Athletic
23	South Bank	0-2	Tow Law Town
24	St Helens Town	3-1	Buxton
25	Sutton Town	1-0	Kirkby Town
26	Ton Pentre	0-1	Bideford
27	Tonbridge	2-3	Horsham
28	Wealdstone	4-2	Dulwich Hamlet
29	Wellingborough Town	1-0	Milton Keynes City
30	Wembley	2-2	Bognor Regis Town
31	Witton Albion	1-3	New Brighton Rakers
32	Woking	3-1	Bromley

=== Replays ===
Tie	Home team	Score	Away team
3	Weston super Mare	3-0	Barnstaple Town
5	Dudley Town	2-0	Boston
11	Leek Town	0-2	Hednesford Town
12	Great Harwood	3-1	Horden Colliery Welfare
14	Cambridge City	2-1	Ilford
30	Bognor Regis Town	2-0	Wembley

== Third qualifying round ==
=== Ties ===
Tie	Home team	Score	Away team
1	A P Leamington	1-3	Worcester City
2	Ashton United	6-0	South Liverpool
3	Banbury United	2-1	Kidderminster Harriers
4	Barrow	0-2	Frickley Athletic
5	Bideford	0-2	Bridgend Town
6	Blyth Spartans	3-0	St Helens Town
7	Bromsgrove Rovers	2-0	Bishop's Stortford
8	Burton Albion	3-1	Sutton Town
9	Cambridge City	3-0	Enderby Town
10	Cheltenham Town	7-1	Bath City
11	Dover	0-1	Sutton United
12	Dudley Town	1-0	Macclesfield Town
13	Grantham	3-2	King's Lynn
14	Gravesend & Northfleet	5-0	Margate
15	Harlow Town	1-2	Walthstow Avenue
16	Harrow Borough	3-0	Wealdstone
17	Hednesford Town	4-2	Telford United
18	Hillingdon Borough	1-0	Bognor Regis Town
19	Horsham	0-2	Staines Town
20	Horwich R M I	0-1	Chorley
21	Kingstonian	0-1	Woking
22	Maidstone United	0-0	Hastings United
23	Marine	3-0	Netherfield
24	Mexborough Town	2-3	Great Harwood
25	New Brighton Rakers	0-2	Goole Town
26	Romford{2}	0-0	Chelmsford City
27	Stalybridge Celtic	1-3	Gainsborough Trinity
28	Tow Law Town	1-0	Emley
29	Waterlooville	0-1	Dartford
30	Wellingborough Town	3-3	Hitchin Town
31	Weston super Mare	0-2	Merthyr Tydfil
32	Whitby Town	2-1	Bishop Auckland

=== Replays ===
Tie	Home team	Score	Away team
22	Hastings United	2-0	Maidstone United (Hastings disqualified)
26	Chelmsford City	2-3	Romford{2}
30	Hitchin Town	2-1	Wellingborough Town

== 1st round ==
The teams that given byes to this round are Scarborough, Workington, Matlock Town, Morecambe, Stafford Rangers, Weymouth, Wigan Athletic, Bedford Town, Kettering Town, Boston United, Yeovil Town, Atherstone Town, Runcorn, Lancaster City, Enfield, Wycombe Wanderers, Dagenham, Tooting & Mitcham United, Leatherhead, Willington, Spennymoor United, Falmouth Town, Altrincham, Minehead, Nuneaton Borough, Northwich Victoria, Bangor City, Hendon, Slough Town, Winsford United, Consett and Crook Town.

=== Ties ===
Tie	Home team	Score	Away team
1	Ashton United	1-3	Wigan Athletic
2	Banbury United	1-2	Leatherhead
3	Bedford Town	2-0	Hillingdon Borough
4	Boston United	4-1	Worcester City
5	Bridgend Town	0-1	Wycombe Wanderers
6	Cheltenham Town	1-2	Hednesford Town
7	Consett	0-1	Lancaster City
8	Crook Town	2-1	Blyth Spartans
9	Dartford	2-0	Sutton United
10	Dudley Town	1-2	Atherstone Town
11	Enfield	2-0	Staines Town
12	Falmouth Town	3-0	Minehead
13	Frickley Athletic	4-0	Morecambe
14	Goole Town	3-1	Tow Law Town
15	Great Harwood	1-2	Whitby Town
16	Harrow Borough	0-1	Dagenham
17	Maidstone United	0-0	Slough Town
18	Marine	1-4	Chorley
19	Matlock Town	1-0	Burton Albion
20	Merthyr Tydfil	4-1	Hitchin Town
21	Nuneaton Borough	2-0	Grantham
22	Romford{2}	0-2	Hendon
23	Scarborough	2-2	Bangor City
24	Spennymoor United	2-1	Gainsborough Trinity
25	Stafford Rangers	0-0	Bromsgrove Rovers
26	Tooting & Mitcham United	3-0	Cambridge City
27	Walthamstow Avenue	1-1	Kettering Town
28	Weymouth	2-1	Yeovil Town
29	Willington	1-1	Runcorn
30	Winsford United	1-0	Northwich Victoria
31	Woking	0-0	Gravesend & Northfleet
32	Workington	0-0	Altrincham

=== Replays ===
Tie	Home team	Score	Away team
17	Slough Town	1-1	Maidstone United
23	Bangor City	1-1	Scarborough
25	Bromsgrove Rovers	0-2	Stafford Rangers
27	Kettering Town	0-1	Walthamstow Avenue
29	Runcorn	4-0	Willington
31	Gravesend & Northfleet	2-0	Woking
32	Altrincham	4-0	Workington

=== 2nd replays ===
Tie	Home team	Score	Away team
17	Maidstone United	0-1	Slough Town
23	Scarborough	1-4	Bangor City

== 2nd round ==
=== Ties ===
Tie	Home team	Score	Away team
1	Altrincham	4-0	Frickley Athletic
2	Atherstone Town	1-0	Stafford Rangers
3	Bedford Town	1-1	Hednesford Town
4	Dagenham	4-2	Crook Town
5	Goole Town	2-1	Wycombe Wanderers
6	Hendon	4-0	Falmouth Town
7	Leatherhead	5-1	Dartford
8	Merthyr Tydfil	4-0	Gravesend & Northfleet
9	Nuneaton Borough	0-0	Bangor City
10	Runcorn	1-0	Boston United
11	Tooting & Mitcham United	3-1	Lancaster City
12	Walthamstow Avenue	3-1	Chorley
13	Weymouth	0-1	Matlock Town
14	Whitby Town	3-5	Spennymoor United
15	Wigan Athletic	1-1	Enfield
16	Winsford United	1-0	Slough Town

=== Replays ===
Tie	Home team	Score	Away team
3	Hednesford Town	2-2	Bedford Town
9	Bangor City	2-1	Nuneaton Borough
15	Enfield	1-1	Wigan Athletic

=== 2nd replays ===
Tie	Home team	Score	Away team
3	Bedford Town	1-0	Hednesford Town
15	Wigan Athletic	3-0	Enfield

== 3rd round ==
=== Ties ===
Tie	Home team	Score	Away team
1	Goole Town	1-2	Merthyr Tydfil
2	Hendon	1-1	Bedford Town
3	Leatherhead	2-0	Wigan Athletic
4	Matlock Town	1-1	Altrincham
5	Runcorn	1-0	Tooting & Mitcham United
6	Spennymoor United	2-1	Atherstone Town
7	Walthamstow Avenue	0-1	Dagenham
8	Winsford United	3-1	Bangor City

=== Replays ===
Tie	Home team	Score	Away team
2	Bedford Town	2-1	Hendon
4	Altrincham	2-0	Matlock Town

== 4th round ==
=== Ties ===
Tie	Home team	Score	Away team
1	Altrincham	4-2	Winsford United
2	Bedford Town	0-0	Leatherhead
3	Merthyr Tydfil	0-0	Runcorn
4	Spennymoor United	1-0	Dagenham

=== Replays ===
Tie	Home team	Score	Away team
2	Leatherhead	5-2	Bedford Town
3	Runcorn	3-2	Merthyr Tydfil

== Semi finals ==
=== First leg ===
Tie	Home team	Score	Away team
1	Altrincham	0-0	Runcorn
2	Leatherhead	2-0	Spennymoor United

=== Second leg ===
Tie	Home team	Score	Away team	Aggregate
1	Runcorn	0-1	Altrincham	0-1
2	Spennymoor United	2-1	Leatherhead	2-3

== Final ==
Home team	Score	Away team
Altrincham	3-1	Leatherhead
