= Kenny Burns =

Scottish footballer (born 1953)

Personal information
- Full name: Kenneth Burns
- Date of birth: 23 September 1953 (age 73)
- Place of birth: Glasgow, Scotland
- Height: 5 ft 11 in (1.80 m)
- Positions: Defender; striker

Youth career
- Glasgow Amateurs
- 1969–1971: Rangers

Senior career*
Years	Team	Apps	(Gls)
1971–1977	Birmingham City	170	(45)
1977–1981	Nottingham Forest	137	(13)
1981–1984	Leeds United	56	(2)
1984–1985	Derby County	38	(2)
1984–1985	→ Notts County (loan)	2	(0)
1985–1986	Barnsley	21	(0)
1986	IF Elfsborg	0	(0)
1986–1988	Sutton Town		
1988	Stafford Rangers	5	(0)
1988–1989	Grantham Town	18	(5)
1989	Gainsborough Trinity		
1989–1990	Willenhall Town	21	(0)
1990–1993	Ilkeston Town	124	(55)
1993	Oakham United		
Total		592	(122)

International career
1974–1976	Scotland U23	2	(0)
1974–1981	Scotland	20	(1)
- * Club domestic league appearances and goals

Kenneth Burns (born 23 September 1953) is a former Scotland international footballer. The peak of his playing career was Nottingham Forest, with whom he won the 1977–78 Football League title and the FWA Player of the Year award. He also won two European Cups and two Football League Cups.

== Playing career ==
Burns was born in Glasgow and started his career with Rangers as an apprentice, but did not play a senior match for the club.

On being released in 1971, aged 17, he signed for Birmingham City. He arrived at the club as a defender, but was converted to striker after Bob Latchford left in 1974, and won the club's Player of the Year award that same year. He earned the first of his 20 international caps in that role soon afterwards.

After joining Nottingham Forest for £150,000 in 1977, he was converted back into a central defender by Brian Clough and Peter Taylor. He was one of three signings Forest made along with Archie Gemmill and Peter Shilton to add to the promotion-winning squad of the previous season. Burns was both FWA Footballer of the Year and Forest's player of the year in 1977–78 in his defensive role as Forest won the First Division title that season, in their first year after returning to the top flight. They also won that season's Football League Cup with a 1–0 replay victory over Liverpool; Burns collected the trophy as captain deputising for the injured John McGovern. Burns was injured for the final when Forest retained the League Cup the following season.

He was an influential figure in the side's European Cup campaigns over the next three seasons, his defensive partnership with Larry Lloyd instrumental to Forest's victory in the 1979 and 1980 tournaments. He also scored in the second leg of the 1979 UEFA Super Cup final victory against Barcelona. At one time he was renowned for his 'wild man' image and while maintaining an aggressive nature, he also possessed a shrewd football brain and was always likely to score vital goals.

He was Forest's player of the year a second time in 1980–81, his last season at the City Ground.

Leeds United paid Forest a £400,000 fee for Burns. He stayed with the Yorkshire side until 1984, and he was the club player of the year in 1982–83. Burns spent 1984–85 at Derby County, also playing a small number of games on loan at Notts County. His last season in the Football League was in 1985–86 at Barnsley, before a spell at Elfsborg in Sweden.

He went on to represent a string of non-league clubs as player or player-coach, finishing up as assistant manager of Telford United in 1993.

== Honours ==
Nottingham Forest

- Football League First Division: 1977–78
- Football League Cup: 1977–78; runner-up: 1979–80
- FA Charity Shield: 1978
- European Cup: 1978–79, 1979–80
- European Super Cup: 1979

Individual

- Nottingham Forest Player of the Year: 1977–78, 1980–81
- FWA Footballer of the Year: 1977–78
