= David Needham =

English footballer

Personal information
- Full name: David William Needham
- Date of birth: 21 May 1949 (age 77)
- Place of birth: Leicester, England
- Position: Central defender

Senior career*
Years	Team	Apps	(Gls)
1965–1977	Notts County	429	(32)
1977	Queens Park Rangers	18	(3)
1977–1982	Nottingham Forest	86	(9)
1982	Toronto Blizzard	12	(1)
1983–1986	Kettering Town	22	(2)
Total		567	(47)

International career
1978	England B	6	(2)
- * Club domestic league appearances and goals

David Needham (born 21 May 1949) is an English former professional footballer who played in the Football League for Notts County, Queens Park Rangers and Nottingham Forest, and in the North American Soccer League for the Toronto Blizzard, in the 1970s and 1980s.

== Playing career ==
=== Notts County ===
Needham started his career at Notts County in 1966. He spent eleven years at the Magpies.

=== Queens Park Rangers ===
He was signed by Queens Park Rangers in the close season of 1977 for £90,000. He was signed to replace the recently retired Frank McLintock in the centre of QPR's defence. He only spent six months at the West London club.

=== Nottingham Forest ===
Newly promoted Nottingham Forest signed him in December 1977 for £140,000. At the end of the 1977–78 season he had picked up a winners medal as Forest won the First Division, but was ineligible for the Football League Cup which they won as he had played for QPR earlier in the competition. He did win a League Cup winners medal the following season when Forest retained the trophy, and was in the team which lost the 1980 final, when a mix-up between Needham and Peter Shilton led to the winning goal for Andy Gray. He was an unused substitute in both of Forest's European Cup final wins in 1979 and 1980.

=== Toronto Blizzard ===
He left Forest in 1982 to play in Canada. He signed for Toronto Blizzard in the North American Soccer League.

=== International ===
Needham was capped six times for England 'B', scoring twice.

== Honours ==
Nottingham Forest

- Football League Cup: 1978–79; runner-up: 1979–80
- European Cup: 1978–79, 1979–80
