= Ian Bowyer =

English footballer (born 1951)

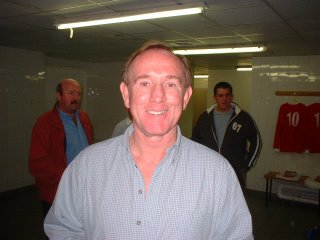
- Bowyer in 2003

Personal information
- Date of birth: 6 June 1951 (age 75)
- Place of birth: Little Sutton, Ellesmere Port, England
- Height: 5 ft 10 in (1.78 m)
- Position: Midfielder

Senior career*
Years	Team	Apps	(Gls)
1968–1971	Manchester City	50	(13)
1971–1973	Leyton Orient	78	(20)
1973–1981	Nottingham Forest	239	(49)
1981–1982	Sunderland	15	(1)
1982–1987	Nottingham Forest	206	(19)
1987–1990	Hereford United	40	(1)
1990–1991	Grantham Town		
Total		628	(103)

Managerial career
- 1987–1990: Hereford United
- * Club domestic league appearances and goals

Ian Bowyer (born 6 June 1951) is an English former footballer who played mostly as a midfielder, best known for many honours in his career at Nottingham Forest. At Nottingham Forest he won the 1977–78 Football League and 1977–78 Football League Cup. The following season he won the 1979 European Cup final and 1978–79 Football League Cup. He was part of Forest's successful retaining of the European Cup the season after. Other honours at Forest included the 1976–77 Anglo-Scottish Cup, 1976 promotion from the English second tier to the top flight, the 1978 FA Charity Shield and the 1979 UEFA Super Cup. At all clubs, in the league alone he played 599 first team games scoring 102 goals in a playing career spanning four decades.

He started his professional career at Manchester City, winning Football League Cup and European Cup Winner's Cup Finals both in 1970. He then played two seasons at Orient before his lengthy career at Forest. His playing days at Forest were interrupted with a season at Sunderland. After Forest he went to Hereford United, who he player-managed, winning the 1989-90 Welsh Cup. He has also been involved after playing at Plymouth Argyle, Rotherham United, Birmingham City, Nottingham Forest and Rushden and Diamonds.

== Playing career ==
=== Manchester City ===
He started his career at Manchester City, debuting for the first team at Newcastle United on 16 November 1968. City won the 1969 FA Cup final but Bowyer did not feature in the final.

The following season, as an 18-year-old, Bowyer made 33 full league appearances and one as substitute for City as they finished 11th in the First Division. He was also a regular in Manchester City's League Cup run and scored twice in their two-legged semi final against local rivals United. In March he came on as a substitute for Mike Summerbee in the 1970 Football League Cup final beating West Bromwich Albion 2–1. Manchester City also won the Cup Winners Cup that season and Bowyer played his part in that European success too. City overcame Athletic Bilbao in the first round, 6–3 on aggregate with Bowyer playing in both and scoring in the second leg 3–0 home win. He also played in both second-round games against Belgian club Lierse S.K. but missed out on the next two rounds. He replaced Mike Doyle after 23 minutes in the 1970 European Cup Winners' Cup final against Górnik Zabrze in Vienna. City won 2–1.

The following season he made 13 appearances for City, including six as substitute and one in the cup. His last game for the club was on 1 May 1971, against Tottenham Hotspur. In total he scored 13 goals in his 57 City first team appearances. After Peter Swales' takeover of the Manchester City and the exclusive appointment of Malcolm Allison, Bowyer was out of favour and was sold to Orient under the management of Jimmy Bloomfield for £25,000.

=== Orient ===
Bowyer was Bloomfield's last signing before he took over as the manager of top flight Leicester City. Ironically Bowyer would score against Bloomfield's Leicester in Orient's shock 2-0 FA Cup win at Filbert Street the following season.

Bowyer, playing at no 11, was an ever present, and top scorer with 14 goals, for Orient in 1971–72. Bowyer scored a hat trick in his first game at Brisbane Road, a 4–1 win against Cardiff City. Orient beat Wrexham and Leicester City to reach the 5th round. Bowyer scored in both those ties. Orient beat Chelsea 3–2 in the round of 16 to qualify for another all-London home tie against Arsenal in the quarter-finals. The next season, as Orient struggled against relegation from the second division, Bowyer made 33 appearances and three as substitute.

=== Nottingham Forest ===
In 1973 Bowyer was signed by Dave Mackay, then manager of Nottingham Forest for £40,000. Like Orient, Forest were also in the second tier of the Football League at the time. Bowyer made his debut at Blackpool on 20 October 1973, scoring in a 2–2 draw. Forest overcame Bristol Rovers 4–3 in one of the early Sunday matches in the FA Cup 3rd round setting up another home tie against his old club, Manchester City in the 4th round. Over 41,000 fans watched Forest eliminate first division City 4–1 with Bowyer scoring twice. The team overcame Portsmouth in the 5th round before facing Newcastle United in the quarter final at St James' Park. Bowyer was part of the team that appeared to be taking Forest through to the semi-finals, winning 3–1 against ten players, before Newcastle fans invaded the pitch and got the match suspended for eight minutes. When the game resumed, Newcastle stormed back to win 4–3, although the F.A. ordered that the match be replayed at Goodison Park, home of Everton. After a second replay, Newcastle prevailed. Brian Clough took over as manager in 1975, bringing in Peter Taylor as his assistant the year after. Bowyer and Forest were promoted back to the top tier at the end of the 1976–77 Football League, the first season Clough and Taylor were in joint charge at Forest.

In their first season back in the top flight Forest were Football League champions finishing seven points above Liverpool (at a time when two points were awarded for a win). Forest beat Liverpool in a replay in that season's 1978 Football League Cup final.

Forest retained the League Cup the season after beating Southampton 3–2 with Bowyer an unused substitute in the final. They were drawn against Liverpool in the first round of the 1978–79 European Cup progressing 2–0 on aggregate. In the semi-final Bowyer scored the decisive goal against FC Köln in the 1–0 win in Germany after a 3–3 draw in Nottingham. Bowyer played in the 1–0 1979 European Cup Final win against Malmo just as he did the following season against Hamburger SV.

=== Sunderland ===
He left Forest in January 1981 to join Sunderland, debuting for them on 28 January 1981 against Manchester United.

=== Return to Forest ===
The following year he re-joined Forest and went on to make another 200 league appearances for them, finishing with a total of 564 Forest senior games, scoring 96 goals.

== Coaching and management ==
He joined Hereford United as a player-manager in July 1987, succeeding John Newman as manager three months later. He led Hereford to Welsh Cup glory in 1990 before leaving the club. He finished his playing career at Grantham Town.

In 1994, he became assistant manager to Peter Shilton at Plymouth Argyle, and he later moved to Rotherham United until September 1996. He later became a coach at Birmingham City.

He returned to Forest as coach in 2002, and stayed for three years. In 2006, he was appointed assistant manager to Paul Hart at Rushden & Diamonds, and he later scouted for Portsmouth.

== Managerial statistics ==
All competitive league games (league and domestic cup) and international matches (including friendlies) are included.

As of 11 April 2015

Team	Nat	Year	Record				
Team	Nat	Year	G	W	D	L	Win %
Hereford United	(England)	1987–1990	142	46	37	59	32.39
Career Total			142	46	37	59	32.39

== Honours ==
Manchester City

- Football League Cup: 1969–70
- UEFA Cup Winners' Cup: 1969–70

Nottingham Forest

- Football League First Division: 1977–78
- Football League Second Division promotion: 1976–77
- Football League Cup: 1977–78; runner-up: 1979–80
- FA Charity Shield: 1978
- Anglo-Scottish Cup: 1976–77
- European Cup: 1978–79, 1979–80
- UEFA Super Cup: 1979
