= 1977–78 Football League Cup =

1977–78 League Cup
Tournament details
- Country: England; Wales
- Teams: 92

Final positions
- Champions: Nottingham Forest
- Runners-up: Liverpool

Tournament statistics
- Top goal scorer(s): Ian Bowyer; Kenny Dalglish (6 goals)

The 1977–78 Football League Cup was the 18th season of the Football League Cup, a knockout competition for England's top 92 football clubs. The competition started on 13 August 1977 and ended with the final going to a replay on 22 March 1978.

The final was contested by First Division teams Nottingham Forest and Liverpool at Wembley Stadium in London, followed by a replay at Old Trafford.

== First round ==
=== First leg ===
Home team	Score	Away team	Date
Aldershot	1–1	Colchester United	13 August 1977
Brentford	2–1	Crystal Palace	13 August 1977
Bristol Rovers	1–2	Walsall	13 August 1977
Burnley	2–0	Chester	13 August 1977
Bury	3–0	Crewe Alexandra	13 August 1977
Cambridge United	0–0	Brighton & Hove Albion	13 August 1977
Chesterfield	4–1	Barnsley	13 August 1977
Darlington	0–0	Scunthorpe United	13 August 1977
Exeter City	2–2	Plymouth Argyle	13 August 1977
Fulham	0–2	Leyton Orient	13 August 1977
Gillingham	1–1	Wimbledon	13 August 1977
Grimsby Town	3–0	Hartlepool United	13 August 1977
Hereford United	2–0	Bournemouth	13 August 1977
Huddersfield Town	1–1	Carlisle United	13 August 1977
Mansfield Town	0–1	Lincoln City	13 August 1977
Oxford United	3–0	Shrewsbury Town	13 August 1977
Peterborough United	4–1	Bradford City	13 August 1977
Port Vale	2–1	Preston North End	13 August 1977
Portsmouth	3–1	Newport County	13 August 1977
Rochdale	1–1	Halifax Town	13 August 1977
Rotherham United	3–0	York City	13 August 1977
Sheffield Wednesday	5–2	Doncaster Rovers	13 August 1977
Southend United	2–3	Northampton Town	13 August 1977
Swansea City	1–3	Swindon Town	13 August 1977
Torquay United	1–0	Cardiff City	13 August 1977
Tranmere Rovers	0–1	Southport	13 August 1977
Watford	2–1	Reading	13 August 1977
Wrexham	1–0	Stockport County	13 August 1977

=== Second leg ===
Home team	Score	Away team	Date	Agg
Barnsley	3–0	Chesterfield	16 August 1977	4–4
Bournemouth	4–2	Hereford United	16 August 1977	4–4
Bradford City	1–1	Peterborough United	17 August 1977	2–5
Brighton & Hove Albion	0–0	Cambridge United	16 August 1977	0–0
Cardiff City	3–2	Torquay United	17 August 1977	3–3
Carlisle United	2–2	Huddersfield Town	16 August 1977	3–3
Chester	1–0	Burnley	17 August 1977	1–2
Colchester United	4–1	Aldershot	16 August 1977	5–2
Crewe Alexandra	1–1	Bury	17 August 1977	1–4
Crystal Palace	5–1	Brentford	16 August 1977	6–3
Doncaster Rovers	0–3	Sheffield Wednesday	16 August 1977	2–8
Halifax Town	1–2	Rochdale	16 August 1977	2–3
Hartlepool United	1–2	Grimsby Town	16 August 1977	1–5
Leyton Orient	1–2	Fulham	16 August 1977	3–2
Lincoln City	0–0	Mansfield Town	17 August 1977	1–0
Newport County	3–2	Portsmouth	16 August 1977	4–5
Northampton Town	2–1	Southend United	16 August 1977	5–3
Plymouth Argyle	0–0	Exeter City	16 August 1977	2–2
Preston North End	2–1	Port Vale	17 August 1977	3–3
Reading	1–0	Watford	17 August 1977	2–2
Scunthorpe United	3–1	Darlington	16 August 1977	3–1
Shrewsbury Town	2–2	Oxford United	16 August 1977	2–5
Southport	2–2	Tranmere Rovers	16 August 1977	3–2
Stockport County	1–1	Wrexham	17 August 1977	1–2
Swindon Town	2–1	Swansea City	16 August 1977	5–2
Walsall	1–0	Bristol Rovers	16 August 1977	3–1
Wimbledon	3–1	Gillingham	16 August 1977	4–2
York City	3–0	Rotherham United	16 August 1977	3–3

=== Replays ===
Home team	Score	Away team	Date
Barnsley	0–2	Chesterfield	23 August 1977
Brighton & Hove Albion	3–1	Cambridge United	23 August 1977
Cardiff City	2–1	Torquay United	24 August 1977
Hereford United	1–2	Bournemouth	23 August 1977
Huddersfield Town	2–1	Carlisle United	23 August 1977
Plymouth Argyle	0–1	Exeter City	23 August 1977
Port Vale	1–2	Preston North End	23 August 1977
Watford	5–0	Reading	23 August 1977
York City	1–1	Rotherham United	23 August 1977

== Second round ==
=== Ties ===
Home team	Score	Away team	Date
Arsenal	3–2	Manchester United	30 August 1977
Birmingham City	0–2	Notts County	30 August 1977
Blackburn Rovers	1–1	Colchester United	31 August 1977
Blackpool	2–2	Sheffield Wednesday	30 August 1977
Bolton Wanderers	1–0	Lincoln City	30 August 1977
Brighton & Hove Albion	0–0	Oldham Athletic	30 August 1977
Bristol City	1–0	Stoke City	29 August 1977
Burnley	3–1	Norwich City	30 August 1977
Charlton Athletic	1–2	Wrexham	30 August 1977
Chesterfield	0–1	Manchester City	31 August 1977
Crystal Palace	0–0	Southampton	30 August 1977
Derby County	3–1	Leyton Orient	31 August 1977
Exeter City	1–3	Aston Villa	31 August 1977
Grimsby Town	1–2	Watford	30 August 1977
Huddersfield Town	0–2	Coventry City	30 August 1977
Ipswich Town	5–0	Northampton Town	30 August 1977
Liverpool	2–0	Chelsea	30 August 1977
Newcastle United	0–2	Millwall	31 August 1977
Nottingham Forest	5–0	West Ham United	30 August 1977
Oxford United	1–1	Bury	31 August 1977
Peterborough United	1–1	Scunthorpe United	30 August 1977
Portsmouth	2–0	Leicester City	30 August 1977
Queens Park Rangers	2–0	Bournemouth	31 August 1977
Rochdale	0–3	Leeds United	31 August 1977
Sheffield United	0–3	Everton	30 August 1977
Southport	2–2	Hull City	31 August 1977
Sunderland	2–2	Middlesbrough	30 August 1977
Swindon Town	5–1	Cardiff City	30 August 1977
Tottenham Hotspur	4–0	Wimbledon	30 August 1977
Walsall	0–0	Preston North End	31 August 1977
West Bromwich Albion	4–0	Rotherham United	31 August 1977
Wolverhampton Wanderers	1–3	Luton Town	30 August 1977

=== Replays ===
Home team	Score	Away team	Date
Bury	1–0	Oxford United	5 September 1977
Colchester United	4–0	Blackburn Rovers	7 September 1977
Hull City	1–0	Southport	14 September 1977
Middlesbrough	1–0	Sunderland	13 September 1977
Oldham Athletic	2–2	Brighton & Hove Albion	13 September 1977
Preston North End	0–1	Walsall	6 September 1977
Scunthorpe United	0–1	Peterborough United	6 September 1977
Sheffield Wednesday	3–1	Blackpool	5 September 1977
Southampton	2–1	Crystal Palace	13 September 1977

=== 2nd Replay ===
Home team	Score	Away team	Date
Brighton & Hove Albion	1–2	Oldham Athletic	27 September 1977

== Last 32 ==
=== Ties ===
Home team	Score	Away team	Date
Arsenal	2–0	Southampton	25 October 1977
Aston Villa	1–0	Queens Park Rangers	26 October 1977
Bolton Wanderers	3–1	Peterborough United	25 October 1977
Burnley	1–2	Ipswich Town	25 October 1977
Everton	2–2	Middlesbrough	25 October 1977
Hull City	2–0	Oldham Athletic	25 October 1977
Leeds United	4–0	Colchester United	26 October 1977
Liverpool	2–0	Derby County	26 October 1977
Luton Town	1–1	Manchester City	25 October 1977
Millwall	1–1	Bury	25 October 1977
Nottingham Forest	4–0	Notts County	25 October 1977
Portsmouth	1–1	Swindon Town	25 October 1977
Sheffield Wednesday	2–1	Walsall	25 October 1977
Tottenham Hotspur	2–3	Coventry City	26 October 1977
West Bromwich Albion	1–0	Watford	25 October 1977
Wrexham	1–0	Bristol City	26 October 1977

=== Replays ===
Home team	Score	Away team	Date
Bury	2–0	Millwall	1 November 1977
Manchester City	0–0	Luton Town	1 November 1977
Middlesbrough	1–2	Everton	31 October 1977
Swindon Town	4–3	Portsmouth	1 November 1977

=== 2nd Replay ===
Home team	Score	Away team	Date
Luton Town	2–3	Manchester City	9 November 1977

== Last 16 ==
=== Ties ===
Home team	Score	Away team	Date
Arsenal	5–1	Hull City	29 November 1977
Bolton Wanderers	1–3	Leeds United	30 November 1977
Bury	1–0	West Bromwich Albion	29 November 1977
Ipswich Town	1–2	Manchester City	29 November 1977
Liverpool	2–2	Coventry City	29 November 1977
Nottingham Forest	4–2	Aston Villa	29 November 1977
Sheffield Wednesday	1–3	Everton	29 November 1977
Wrexham	2–0	Swindon Town	7 December 1977

=== Replay ===
Home team	Score	Away team	Date
Coventry City	0–2	Liverpool	20 December 1977

== Quarter-Finals ==
=== Ties ===
Home team	Score	Away team	Date
Bury	0–3	Nottingham Forest	17 January 1978
Leeds United	4–1	Everton	18 January 1978
Manchester City	0–0	Arsenal	18 January 1978
Wrexham	1–3	Liverpool	17 January 1978

=== Replay ===
Home team	Score	Away team	Date
Arsenal	1–0	Manchester City	24 January 1978

== Semi-finals ==
=== First leg ===
Home team	Score	Away team	Date
Leeds United	1–3	Nottingham Forest	8 February 1978
Liverpool	2–1	Arsenal	7 February 1978

=== Second leg ===
Home team	Score	Away team	Date	Agg
Arsenal	0–0	Liverpool	14 February 1978	1–2
Nottingham Forest	4–2	Leeds United	22 February 1978	7–3

== Final ==
1978 League Cup Final
- Event: League Cup 1977–78
Nottingham Forest	Liverpool
Nottingham Forest	Liverpool
0	0
- Date: 18 March 1978
- Venue: Wembley Stadium, London

Replay
Nottingham Forest	Liverpool
1	0
- Date: 22 March 1978
- Venue: Old Trafford, Manchester

=== Match details ===
Nottingham Forest	Liverpool

Nottingham Forest; Red shirts/White shorts/Red socks	0 — 0 (final score after extra time)	Liverpool; White shirts/Black shorts/White socks
Manager: Brian Clough Team: 1 Chris Woods (GK); 2 Viv Anderson; 3 Frank Clark; 4 John McGovern (c) (substituted off); 5 Larry Lloyd; 6 Kenny Burns; 7 Martin O'Neill; 8 Ian Bowyer; 9 Peter Withe; 10 Tony Woodcock; 11 John Robertson; Substitute: 12 John O'Hare (substituted on) Scorers: None	Half-time: 0–0 Competition: Football League Cup (Final) Date: 15.00 GMT Saturday 18 March 1978 Venue: Wembley Stadium, London Attendance: 100,000 Referee: Pat Partridge Match rules: 90 minutes. 30 minutes extra-time if necessary. Match replayed if scores still level. One named substitute.	Manager: Bob Paisley Team: 1 Ray Clemence (GK); 2 Phil Neal; 3 Tommy Smith; 4 Phil Thompson; 5 Ray Kennedy (substituted off) 91'; 6 Emlyn Hughes (c); 7 Kenny Dalglish; 8 Jimmy Case; 9 Steve Heighway; 10 Terry McDermott; 11 Ian Callaghan; Substitute: 12 David Fairclough (substituted on) 91' Scorers: None

=== Replay ===
Nottingham Forest	Liverpool

Nottingham Forest; Yellow/Yellow shorts/Yellow socks	1 — 0 (final score after 90 minutes)	Liverpool; Red shirts/Red shorts/Red socks
Manager: Brian Clough Team: 1 Chris Woods (GK); 2 Viv Anderson; 3 Frank Clark; 4 John O'Hare; 5 Larry Lloyd; 6 Kenny Burns (c); 7 Martin O'Neill; 8 Ian Bowyer; 9 Peter Withe; 10 Tony Woodcock; 11 John Robertson; Substitute; 12Steve Elliot Scorers: John Robertson 54' (penalty)	Half-time: 0–0 Competition: Football League Cup (Final) Date: 19.45 BST Wednesday 22 March 1978 Venue: Old Trafford, Manchester Attendance: 54,375 Referee: Pat Partridge Match rules: 90 minutes. 30 minutes extra-time if necessary. Match replayed if scores still level. One named substitute.	Manager: Bob Paisley Team: 1 Ray Clemence (GK); 2 Phil Neal; 3 Ray Kennedy; 4 Tommy Smith; 5 Phil Thompson; 6 Emlyn Hughes (c); 7 Kenny Dalglish; 8 Jimmy Case (substituted off) 64'; 9 Steve Heighway; 10 Terry McDermott; 11 Ian Callaghan; Substitute; 12 David Fairclough (substituted on) 64' Scorers: None
