= Tony Woodcock (footballer) =

English footballer (born 1955)

Personal information
- Full name: Anthony Stewart Woodcock
- Date of birth: 6 December 1955 (age 70)
- Place of birth: Eastwood, Nottinghamshire, England
- Height: 1.78 m (5 ft 10 in)
- Position: Striker

Youth career
- Priory Celtic
- Nottingham Forest

Senior career*
Years	Team	Apps	(Gls)
1974–1979	Nottingham Forest	129	(36)
1976	→ Lincoln City (loan)	4	(1)
1977	→ Doncaster Rovers (loan)	6	(2)
1979–1982	1. FC Köln	81	(28)
1982–1986	Arsenal	131	(56)
1986–1988	1. FC Köln	49	(11)
1988–1990	Fortuna Köln	37	(5)
Total		437	(139)

International career
1977–1978	England U21	2	(5)
1980	England B	1	(0)
1978–1986	England	42	(16)
- * Club domestic league appearances and goals

Anthony Stewart Woodcock (born 6 December 1955) is an English retired international footballer who played professionally in both England and Germany as a striker for Nottingham Forest, FC Köln and Arsenal. Woodcock won the European Cup (now known as the UEFA Champions League) in 1979 with Nottingham Forest.

== Club career ==
=== Early career ===
Born in Eastwood, Nottinghamshire, Woodcock trained with Alan and Steve Buckley as a child, coached by their father, and played for Priory Celtic. He started his career at Nottingham Forest, signing a contract in January 1974. After loan spells at Lincoln City and Doncaster Rovers, Woodcock broke into the Forest first team in 1976–77, helping the team to promotion to the First Division. Woodcock later credited the Lincoln move and the leadership of Graham Taylor as being instrumental to his development. Under Brian Clough, Forest went on to win the First Division title and Football League Cup in 1978 with Woodcock winning the PFA Young Player of the Year award that year as well, and the European Cup in 1979. He also scored in Forest's victory over Southampton in the 1979 Football League Cup Final.

=== Move to the Bundesliga ===
Woodcock was signed by West German side FC Köln for a fee of £600,000 (equivalent to £2,950,000 in 2025), in time for the 1979–80 season. He spent three seasons there. He scored 28 goals in 81 matches for the Cologne club.

=== Arsenal ===
He returned home after the 1982 World Cup, signing for Terry Neill's Arsenal for £500,000. Woodcock was Arsenal's top scorer for the next three seasons, his best tally being 21 in 1983–84; he hit five in a single game against Aston Villa, a post-war record for the club, he also scored the final goal in the last British Home Championship. He helped Arsenal reach the semi-finals of both domestic cups in his first season, and remained in favour with new manager Don Howe, who was appointed in December 1983 following the dismissal of Terry Neill after a poor first half of the season. Woodcock also contributed to a strong start to the 1984–85 season for Arsenal, which saw them top the league in the autumn of 1984.

However, he suffered a serious injury in March 1985, which disrupted his career. With the arrival of George Graham as Arsenal manager in May 1986, the 30-year-old Woodcock was informed he was surplus to requirements.

Woodcock scored a total of 68 goals in 169 matches for the Gunners.

=== Return to Germany ===
Woodcock then returned to FC Köln for a fee of "about £200,000". During his second spell there, he made 49 appearances and scored 11 goals. He finished his career playing for Fortuna Köln, making 37 appearances and scoring five goals, before retiring from playing in 1990.

== International career ==
=== England under-21s ===
Woodcock made two appearances for the England under-21s, scoring five goals; a hat-trick on his debut against Finland in a record 8–1 win and two against Italy under-21s.

=== Senior side ===
Woodcock was first called up to the full England squad for the match against Hungary. He made his début for England in 1978 against Northern Ireland. He would go on to win 42 caps for his country (scoring 16 goals), and play in the UEFA Euro 1980 and the 1982 FIFA World Cup. He also played in the 1986 FIFA World Cup qualifiers but was left out of the final squad.

== Honours ==
Nottingham Forest

- Football League First Division: 1977–78
- Football League Cup: 1977–78, 1978–79
- FA Charity Shield: 1978
- European Cup: 1978–79

Individual

- Nottingham Forest Player of the Year: 1977
- PFA Young Player of the Year: 1977–78
- Arsenal Player of the Season: 1982−83
- Arsenal Top Scorer: 1982–83, 1983–84, 1984–85
