= English football clubs in international competitions =

This article details performances of English football clubs in international competitions.

== International competitions ==
=== European competitions ===
With 52 UEFA club competition trophies won, English football clubs are the second-most successful in European football, behind only Spain (67). In the top-tier, the UEFA Champions League, a record six English clubs have won a total of 15 titles and lost a further 12 finals, behind Spanish clubs with 20 and 11, respectively. In the second-tier, the UEFA Europa League, English clubs are second, with eleven victories and nine losses in the finals. In the former second-tier UEFA Cup Winners' Cup, English teams won a record eight titles and had a further five finalists. In the non-UEFA organized Inter-Cities Fairs Cup, English clubs provided four winners and four runners-up, the second-most behind Spain with six and three, respectively. In the newly created third-tier UEFA Conference League, English clubs have a record three titles so far. In the former fourth-tier UEFA Intertoto Cup, England won four titles and had a further final appearance, placing it fifth in the rankings, although English clubs were notorious for treating the tournament with disdain, either sending "B" squads or withdrawing from it altogether. In the single-tie UEFA Super Cup, England has ten winners and twelve runners-up, the second-most behind Spain with 17 and 15, respectively.

==== Heysel ban ====
English teams have participated in UEFA competitions every year except for 1955–56 and the years between 1985 and 1990, when in the aftermath of the Heysel Stadium disaster all English clubs were banned from Europe by UEFA; Liverpool, who had been playing at the Heysel Stadium against Italian side Juventus, were banned for six years, until 1991.

=== Intercontinental competitions ===
English clubs made a total of six appearances in the single-tie Intercontinental Cup organized by UEFA and CONMEBOL, winning only one of them, and withdrew a further three times. Despite its international status of the Club World Championship, English teams did not take the competition seriously enough. English clubs have won the FIFA-organized Club World Cup five times, the second-most behind only Spain, with eight.

Upton Park represented Great Britain in the football tournament at the 1900 Summer Olympics, which at that time was organized solely by the International Olympic Committee, and won the gold medal.

=== Other competitions ===
Prior to the establishment of official UEFA competitions in the 1950s, England had been pioneers in early continental football, organizing the Sir Thomas Lipton Trophy, which was won by West Auckland when they defeated Juventus in 1909. In 1969, due to the non-top-flight Swindon Town winning the Football League Cup, the Anglo-Italian League Cup was created to allow alternative European football outside UEFA regulations. It continued off-and-on until 1976.

== Qualification for UEFA competitions ==
From the 2021–22 season, the various permutations allow for a maximum of five English clubs to qualify for the UEFA Champions League, three for the UEFA Europa League and one for the UEFA Conference League. From the 2018–19 season, the top four clubs in Europe's four highest ranked leagues qualify directly to the group stage. These nations are currently England, Germany, Italy, and Spain. The minimum quota is for four English clubs to qualify for the UEFA Champions League and two for the UEFA Europa League.

Competition	Who qualifies	Notes
UEFA Champions League group stage	Premier League 1st	
UEFA Champions League group stage	Premier League 2nd	
UEFA Champions League group stage	Premier League 3rd	
UEFA Champions League group stage	Premier League 4th	
UEFA Champions League group stage	UEFA Champions League winners	Since the 2015–16 season, the UEFA Champions League winners gain entry to the UEFA Champions League in the group stages.
UEFA Champions League group stage	UEFA Europa League winners	Prior to the 2015–16 season, there was a limit of four clubs from each association entering the Champions League. If a club outside of England's top four won the Champions League, the 4th placed club would be demoted to the Europa League in the following season. This occurred in the 2011–12 season when Chelsea won the Champions League but only finished sixth in the Premier League. They replaced the fourth-placed team Tottenham Hotspur in the Champions League, who were demoted to the Europa League. From the 2018–19 season, the UEFA Europa League winners gain entry to the UEFA Champions League in the group stage. Also from that season, if English clubs win both the UEFA Champions League and UEFA Europa League, and neither finish the Premier League in a position that qualifies them for the UEFA Champions League, the following will happen: The club that won the UEFA Champions League will go straight into the group stage; The UEFA Europa League winners will go into the UEFA Champions League group stage; The club that finished fourth in the Premier League will transfer into the UEFA Europa League group stage
UEFA Europa League group stage	FA Cup winners or Premier League 6th	If the FA Cup winners qualify for the UEFA Champions League or the UEFA Europa League via the domestic league or European performance, by Regulation 3.04, the highest ranking non-qualified league club qualifies, taking the lowest Europa League spot (the League Cup spot – the League Cup inherits the League spot, and the League inherits the FA Cup spot).
UEFA Europa League group stage	Premier League 5th	If the FA Cup winners qualify for the UEFA Champions League or the UEFA Europa League via the domestic league or European performance, by Regulation 3.04, the highest ranking non-qualified league club qualifies, taking the lowest Europa League spot (the League Cup spot – the League Cup inherits the League spot, and the League inherits the FA Cup spot).
UEFA Europa League group stage	UEFA Conference League winners	
UEFA Conference League play-off round	League Cup winners or Premier League 6th/7th	If the League Cup winners have already qualified for Europe through other means, then the next highest-finishing Premier League club gets this place
UEFA Europa League first qualifying round	Premier League club with the best UEFA Fair Play ranking that has not already qualified for Europe, but only if England has one of the top three positions and has a fair play score of above eight.	As of 2015, Fair Play no longer earns this Europa League spot. Instead, such teams will be awarded in cash prizes, with the money to be spent on related initiatives.

=== Wales-based clubs ===
Note that some Football League clubs are not based in England. Because they are members of the Football Association of Wales (FAW), the question of which country clubs like Cardiff City and Swansea City should represent in European competitions has caused long-running discussions in UEFA. Despite being a member of the FAW, Swansea took up one of England's three available places in the UEFA Europa League in 2013–14, thanks to winning the League Cup in 2012–13. The right of Welsh clubs to take up such English places was in doubt until UEFA clarified the matter in March 2012.

== Title winners ==
Liverpool are the most successful English and British team internationally with fourteen honours, winning the most prestigious Champions League six times, also English and British records. A full list of winners is below.

=== English clubs by number of international honours ===
Club	Number of titles										
Club	European competitions							Intercontinental competitions			Total
Club	European Cup/Champions League	UEFA Cup/Europa League	Conference League	Cup Winners' Cup	Intertoto Cup	Super Cup	Inter-Cities Fairs Cup	FIFA Club World Cup	Intercontinental Cup	Olympic Games	Total
Liverpool	6	3				4		1			14
Chelsea	2	2	1	2		2		2			11
Manchester United	3	1		1		1		1	1		8
Aston Villa	1	1			1	1					4
Manchester City	1			1		1		1			4
Tottenham Hotspur		3		1							4
Nottingham Forest	2					1					3
West Ham United			1	1	1						3
Arsenal				1			1				2
Leeds United							2				2
Newcastle United					1		1				2
Ipswich Town		1									1
Crystal Palace			1								1
Everton				1							1
Fulham					1						1
Upton Park										1	1
Total	15	11	3	8	4	10	4	5	1	1	62

=== Chronology ===
European Cup/Champions League	UEFA Cup/Europa League	Conference League	Cup Winners' Cup	Inter-Cities Fairs Cup	Super Cup	FIFA Club World Cup	Intercontinental Cup	Intertoto Cup	Olympic Games
2022–23 – Manchester City	2025–26 – Aston Villa	2025–26 – Crystal Palace	1997–98 – Chelsea	1970–71 – Leeds United	2023 – Manchester City	2025 – Chelsea	1999 – Manchester United	2006 – Newcastle United	1900 – Upton Park
2020–21 – Chelsea	2024–25 – Tottenham Hotspur	2024–25 – Chelsea	1993–94 – Arsenal	1969–70 – Arsenal	2021 – Chelsea	2023 – Manchester City		2002 – Fulham	
2018–19 – Liverpool	2018–19 – Chelsea	2022–23 – West Ham United	1990–91 – Manchester United	1968–69 – Newcastle United	2019 – Liverpool	2021 – Chelsea		2001 – Aston Villa	
2011–12 – Chelsea	2016–17 – Manchester United		1984–85 – Everton	1967–68 – Leeds United	2005 – Liverpool	2019 – Liverpool		1999 – West Ham United	
2007–08 – Manchester United	2012–13 – Chelsea		1970–71 – Chelsea		2001 – Liverpool	2008 – Manchester United			
2004–05 – Liverpool	2000–01 – Liverpool		1969–70 – Manchester City		1998 – Chelsea				
1998–99 – Manchester United	1983–84 – Tottenham Hotspur		1964–65 – West Ham United		1991 – Manchester United				
1983–84 – Liverpool	1980–81 – Ipswich Town		1962–63 – Tottenham Hotspur		1982 – Aston Villa				
1981–82 – Aston Villa	1975–76 – Liverpool				1979 – Nottingham Forest				
1980–81 – Liverpool	1972–73 – Liverpool				1977 – Liverpool				
1979–80 – Nottingham Forest	1971–72 – Tottenham Hotspur								
1978–79 – Nottingham Forest
1977–78 – Liverpool
1976–77 – Liverpool
1967–68 – Manchester United

== Full record ==
Note: Clubs in bold won the corresponding competition that season.

=== European Cup/UEFA Champions League ===
English clubs have won the competition fifteen times and been runners-up on twelve occasions.

Season	Club	Progress	Score	Opponents	Venue(s)
1955–56	Chelsea were the first ever English team to qualify for the European Cup. They were drawn against Djurgårdens IF, but were forced to withdraw by the English FA.				
1956–57	Manchester United	Semi-finals	3–5	**(Spain) Real Madrid**	1–3 at Santiago Bernabéu; 2–2 at Old Trafford
1957–58	Manchester United	Semi-finals	2–5	(Italy) Milan	2–1 at Old Trafford; 0–4 at San Siro
1958–59	Manchester United	First round	N/A	(Switzerland) Young Boys	Walkover – United withdrawn by the Football League
1958–59	Wolverhampton Wanderers	First round	3–4	(West Germany) Schalke 04	2–2 at Molineux; 1–2 at Glückauf-Kampfbahn
1959–60	Wolverhampton Wanderers	Quarter-finals	2–9	(Spain) Barcelona	0–4 at Camp Nou; 2–5 at Molineux
1960–61	Burnley	Quarter-finals	4–5	(West Germany) Hamburger SV	3–1 at Turf Moor; 1–4 at Volksparkstadion
1961–62	Tottenham Hotspur	Semi-finals	3–4	**(Portugal) Benfica**	1–3 at Estádio da Luz; 2–1 at White Hart Lane
1962–63	Ipswich Town	First round	2–4	**(Italy) Milan**	0–3 at San Siro; 2–1 at Portman Road
1963–64	Everton	Preliminary round	0–1	**(Italy) Inter Milan**	0–0 at Goodison Park; 0–1 at Stadio Giuseppe Meazza
1964–65	Liverpool	Semi-finals	3–4	**(Italy) Inter Milan**	3–1 at Anfield; 0–3 at Stadio Giuseppe Meazza
1965–66	Manchester United	Semi-finals	1–2	(Socialist Federal Republic of Yugoslavia) Partizan	0–2 at Partizan; 1–0 at Old Trafford
1966–67	Liverpool	Second round	3–7	(Netherlands) Ajax	1–5 at De Meer; 2–2 at Anfield
1967–68	Manchester United	**Winners**	4–1 (a.e.t.)	(Portugal) Benfica	Wembley Stadium, London
1968–69	Manchester City	First round	1–2	(Turkey) Fenerbahçe	0–0 at Maine Road; 1–2 at Şükrü Saracoğlu Stadium
1968–69	Manchester United	Semi-finals	1–2	**(Italy) Milan**	0–2 at San Siro; 1–0 at Old Trafford
1969–70	Leeds United	Semi-finals	1–3	(Scotland) Celtic	0–1 at Elland Road; 1–2 at Hampden Park
1970–71	Everton	Quarter-finals	1–1 (a)	(Greece) Panathinaikos	1–1 at Goodison Park; 0–0 at Leoforos Alexandras Stadium
1971–72	Arsenal	Quarter-finals	1–3	**(Netherlands) Ajax**	1–2 at De Meer Stadion; 0–1 at Highbury Stadium
1972–73	Derby County	Semi-finals	1–3	(Italy) Juventus	1–3 at Stadio Comunale; 0–0 at Baseball Ground
1973–74	Liverpool	Second round	2–4	(Socialist Federal Republic of Yugoslavia) Red Star Belgrade	1–2 at Red Star Stadium; 1–2 at Anfield
1974–75	Leeds United	Final	0–2	**(West Germany) Bayern Munich**	Parc des Princes, Paris
1975–76	Derby County	Second round	5–6	(Spain) Real Madrid	4–1 at Baseball Ground; 1–5 at Santiago Bernabéu
1976–77	Liverpool	**Winners**	3–1	(West Germany) Borussia Mönchengladbach	Stadio Olimpico, Rome
1977–78	Liverpool	**Winners**	1–0	(Belgium) Club Brugge	Wembley Stadium, London
1978–79	Liverpool	First round	0–2	**(England) Nottingham Forest**	0–2 at City Ground; 0–0 at Anfield
1978–79	Nottingham Forest	**Winners**	1–0	(Sweden) Malmö FF	Olympiastadion Munich, Munich
1979–80	Liverpool	First round	2–4	(Soviet Union) Dinamo Tbilisi	2–1 at Anfield; 0–3 at Boris Paichadze Stadium
1979–80	Nottingham Forest	**Winners**	1–0	(West Germany) Hamburger SV	Santiago Bernabéu, Madrid
1980–81	Nottingham Forest	First round	0–2	(Bulgaria) CSKA Sofia	0–1 at Balgarska Armia Stadium; 0–1 at City Ground
1980–81	Liverpool	**Winners**	1–0	(Spain) Real Madrid	Parc des Princes, Paris
1981–82	Liverpool	Quarter-finals	1–2	(Bulgaria) CSKA Sofia	0–1 at Anfield; 2–0 at Balgarska Armia Stadium
1981–82	Aston Villa	**Winners**	1–0	(West Germany) Bayern Munich	De Kuip, Rotterdam
1982–83	Liverpool	Quarter-finals	3–4	(Poland) Widzew Łódź	0–2 at Stadion Widzewa; 3–2 at Anfield
1982–83	Aston Villa	Quarter-finals	2–5	(Italy) Juventus	1–2 at Villa Park; 1–3 at Stadio Olimpico di Torino
1983–84	Liverpool	**Winners**	1–1 (a.e.t.) (4–2 p)	(Italy) Roma	Stadio Olimpico, Rome
1984–85	Liverpool	Final	0–1	**(Italy) Juventus**	Heysel Stadium, Brussels
1985–86	Banned				
1986–87	Banned				
1987–88	Banned				
1988–89	Banned				
1989–90	Banned				
1990–91	Although the ban on English clubs following the Heysel disaster was lifted for the 1990–91 season, Liverpool—who had won the 1989–90 First Division—were serving an additional one-year suspension, leaving England without a representative in the competition.				
1991–92	Arsenal	Second round	2–4	(Portugal) Benfica	1–1 at Estádio da Luz; 1–3 at Highbury
1992–93	Leeds United	Second round	2–4	(Scotland) Rangers	1–2 at Elland Road; 1–2 at Ibrox
1993–94	Manchester United	Second round	3–3 (a)	(Turkey) Galatasaray	3–3 at Old Trafford; 0–0 at Ali Sami Yen Stadium
1994–95	Manchester United	3rd in group stage	N/A	(Sweden) IFK Göteborg, (Spain) Barcelona, (Turkey) Galatasaray	
1995–96	Blackburn Rovers	4th in group stage	N/A	(Russia) Spartak Moscow, (Poland) Legia Warsaw, (Norway) Rosenborg	
1996–97	Manchester United	Semi-finals	0–2	**(Germany) Borussia Dortmund**	0–1 at Signal Iduna Park; 0–1 at Old Trafford
1997–98	Newcastle United	3rd in group stage	N/A	(Ukraine) Dynamo Kyiv, (Netherlands) PSV Eindhoven, (Spain) Barcelona	
1997–98	Manchester United	Quarter-finals	1–1 (a)	(France) Monaco	0–0 at Stade Louis II; 1–1 at Old Trafford
1998–99	Arsenal	3rd in group stage	N/A	(Ukraine) Dynamo Kyiv, (France) Lens, (Greece) Panathinaikos	
1998–99	Manchester United	**Winners**	2–1	(Germany) Bayern Munich	Camp Nou, Barcelona
1999–2000	Arsenal	3rd in first group stage (Transferred to UEL)	N/A	(Spain) Barcelona, (Italy) Fiorentina, (Sweden) AIK	
1999–2000	Chelsea	Quarter-finals	4–6	(Spain) Barcelona	3–1 at Stamford Bridge; 1–5 at Camp Nou
1999–2000	Manchester United	Quarter-finals	2–3	**(Spain) Real Madrid**	0–0 at Santiago Bernabéu; 2–3 at Old Trafford
2000–01	Arsenal	Quarter-finals	2–2 (a)	(Spain) Valencia	2–1 at Highbury; 0–1 at Mestalla
2000–01	Manchester United	Quarter-finals	1–3	**(Germany) Bayern Munich**	0–1 at Old Trafford; 1–2 at Olympiastadion
2000–01	Leeds United	Semi-finals	0–3	(Spain) Valencia	0–0 at Elland Road; 0–3 at Mestalla
2001–02	Arsenal	3rd in second group stage	N/A	(Germany) Bayer Leverkusen, (Spain) Deportivo La Coruña, (Italy) Juventus	
2001–02	Liverpool	Quarter-finals	3–4	(Germany) Bayer Leverkusen	1–0 at Anfield; 2–4 at BayArena
2001–02	Manchester United	Semi-finals	3–3 (a)	(Germany) Bayer Leverkusen	2–2 at Old Trafford; 1–1 at BayArena
2002–03	Liverpool	3rd in first group stage (Transferred to UEL)	N/A	(Spain) Valencia, (Switzerland) Basel, (Russia) Spartak Moscow	
2002–03	Newcastle United	3rd in second group stage	N/A	(Spain) Barcelona, (Italy) Inter Milan, (Germany) Bayer Leverkusen	
2002–03	Arsenal	3rd in second group stage	N/A	(Spain) Valencia, (Netherlands) Ajax, (Italy) Roma	
2002–03	Manchester United	Quarter-finals	5–6	(Spain) Real Madrid	1–3 at Santiago Bernabéu; 4–3 at Old Trafford
2003–04	Newcastle United	Third qualifying round (Transferred to UEL)	1–1 (3–4 p)	(Federal Republic of Yugoslavia) Partizan	1–0 at Partizan Stadium; 0–1 at St James' Park
2003–04	Manchester United	Round of 16	2–3	**(Portugal) Porto**	1–2 at Estádio do Dragão; 1–1 at Old Trafford
2003–04	Arsenal	Quarter-finals	2–3	(England) Chelsea	1–1 at Stamford Bridge; 1–2 at Highbury
2003–04	Chelsea	Semi-finals	3–5	(France) Monaco	1–3 at Stade Louis II; 2–2 at Stamford Bridge
2004–05	Manchester United	Round of 16	0–2	(Italy) Milan	0–1 at Old Trafford; 0–1 at San Siro
2004–05	Arsenal	Round of 16	2–3	(Germany) Bayern Munich	1–3 at Allianz Arena; 1–0 at Highbury
2004–05	Chelsea	Semi-finals	0–1	**(England) Liverpool**	0–0 at Stamford Bridge; 0–1 at Anfield
2004–05	Liverpool	**Winners**	3–3 (a.e.t.) (3–2 p)	(Italy) Milan	Atatürk Olympic Stadium, Istanbul
2005–06	Everton	Third qualifying round (Transferred to UEL)	2–4	(Spain) Villarreal	1–2 at Goodison Park; 1–2 at Estadio El Madrigal
2005–06	Manchester United	4th in group stage	N/A	(Spain) Villarreal, (Portugal) Benfica, (France) Lille	
2005–06	Chelsea	Round of 16	2–3	**(Spain) Barcelona**	1–2 at Stamford Bridge; 0–1 at Camp Nou
2005–06	Liverpool	Round of 16	0–3	(Portugal) Benfica	0–1 at Estádio da Luz; 0–2 at Anfield
2005–06	Arsenal	Final	1–2	**(Spain) Barcelona**	Stade de France, Saint-Denis
2006–07	Arsenal	Round of 16	1–2	(Netherlands) PSV Eindhoven	0–1 at Philips Stadion; 1–1 at Emirates Stadium
2006–07	Chelsea	Semi-finals	1–1 (1–4 p)	(England) Liverpool	1–0 at Stamford Bridge; 0–1 at Anfield
2006–07	Manchester United	Semi-finals	3–5	**(Italy) Milan**	3–2 at Old Trafford; 0–3 at San Siro
2006–07	Liverpool	Final	1–2	**(Italy) Milan**	Olympic Stadium, Athens
2007–08	Arsenal	Quarter-finals	3–5	(England) Liverpool	1–1 at Emirates Stadium; 2–4 at Anfield
2007–08	Liverpool	Semi-finals	3–4	(England) Chelsea	1–1 at Anfield; 2–3 at Stamford Bridge
2007–08	Chelsea	Final	1–1 (a.e.t.) (5–6 p)	**(England) Manchester United**	Luzhniki Stadium, Moscow
2007–08	Manchester United	**Winners**	1–1 (a.e.t.) (6–5 p)	(England) Chelsea	Luzhniki Stadium, Moscow
2008–09	Liverpool	Quarter-finals	5–7	(England) Chelsea	1–3 at Anfield; 4–4 at Stamford Bridge
2008–09	Chelsea	Semi-finals	1–1 (a)	**(Spain) Barcelona**	0–0 at Camp Nou; 1–1 at Stamford Bridge
2008–09	Arsenal	Semi-finals	1–4	(England) Manchester United	0–1 at Old Trafford; 1–3 at Emirates Stadium
2008–09	Manchester United	Final	0–2	**(Spain) Barcelona**	Stadio Olimpico, Rome
2009–10	Liverpool	3rd in group stage (Transferred to UEL)	N/A	(Italy) Fiorentina, (France) Lyon, (Hungary) Debrecen	
2009–10	Chelsea	Round of 16	1–3	**(Italy) Inter Milan**	1–2 at San Siro; 0–1 at Stamford Bridge
2009–10	Arsenal	Quarter-finals	3–6	(Spain) Barcelona	2–2 at Emirates Stadium; 1–4 at Camp Nou
2009–10	Manchester United	Quarter-finals	4–4 (a)	(Germany) Bayern Munich	1–2 at Allianz Arena; 3–2 at Old Trafford
2010–11	Arsenal	Round of 16	3–4	**(Spain) Barcelona**	2–1 at Emirates Stadium; 1–3 at Camp Nou
2010–11	Chelsea	Quarter-finals	1–3	(England) Manchester United	0–1 at Stamford Bridge; 1–2 at Old Trafford
2010–11	Tottenham Hotspur	Quarter-finals	0–5	(Spain) Real Madrid	0–4 at Santiago Bernabéu; 0–1 at White Hart Lane
2010–11	Manchester United	Final	1–3	**(Spain) Barcelona**	Wembley Stadium, London
2011–12	Manchester City	3rd in group stage (Transferred to UEL)	N/A	(Germany) Bayern Munich, (Italy) Napoli, (Spain) Villarreal	
2011–12	Manchester United	3rd in group stage (Transferred to UEL)	N/A	(Portugal) Benfica, (Switzerland) Basel, (Romania) Oțelul Galați	
2011–12	Arsenal	Round of 16	3–4	(Italy) Milan	0–4 at San Siro; 3–0 at Emirates Stadium
2011–12	Chelsea	**Winners**	1–1 (a.e.t.) (4–3 p)	(Germany) Bayern Munich	Allianz Arena, Munich
2012–13	Manchester City	4th in group stage	N/A	(Germany) Borussia Dortmund, (Spain) Real Madrid, (Netherlands) Ajax	
2012–13	Chelsea	3rd in group stage (Transferred to UEL)	N/A	(Italy) Juventus, (Ukraine) Shakhtar Donetsk, (Denmark) Nordsjælland	
2012–13	Manchester United	Round of 16	2–3	(Spain) Real Madrid	1–1 at Santiago Bernabéu; 1–2 at Old Trafford
2012–13	Arsenal	Round of 16	3–3 (a)	**(Germany) Bayern Munich**	1–3 at Emirates Stadium; 0–2 at Allianz Arena
2013–14	Arsenal	Round of 16	1–3	(Germany) Bayern Munich	0–2 at Emirates Stadium; 1–1 at Allianz Arena
2013–14	Manchester City	Round of 16	1–4	(Spain) Barcelona	0–2 at Etihad Stadium; 1–2 at Camp Nou
2013–14	Manchester United	Quarter-finals	2–4	(Germany) Bayern Munich	1–1 at Old Trafford; 1–3 at Allianz Arena
2013–14	Chelsea	Semi-finals	1–3	(Spain) Atlético Madrid	0–0 at Vicente Calderón; 1–3 at Stamford Bridge
2014–15	Liverpool	3rd in group stage (Transferred to UEL)	N/A	(Spain) Real Madrid, (Switzerland) Basel, (Bulgaria) Ludogorets Razgrad	
2014–15	Manchester City	Round of 16	1–3	(Spain) Barcelona	1–2 at Etihad Stadium; 0–1 at Camp Nou
2014–15	Arsenal	Round of 16	3–3 (a)	(France) Monaco	1–3 at Emirates Stadium; 2–0 at Stade Louis II
2014–15	Chelsea	Round of 16	3–3 (a)	(France) Paris Saint-Germain	1–1 at Parc des Princes; 2–2 at Stamford Bridge
2015–16	Manchester United	3rd in group stage (Transferred to UEL)	N/A	(Germany) VfL Wolfsburg, (Netherlands) PSV Eindhoven, (Russia) CSKA Moscow	
2015–16	Arsenal	Round of 16	1–5	(Spain) Barcelona	0–2 at Emirates Stadium; 1–3 at Camp Nou
2015–16	Chelsea	Round of 16	2–4	(France) Paris Saint-Germain	1–2 at Parc des Princes; 1–2 at Stamford Bridge
2015–16	Manchester City	Semi-finals	0–1	(Spain) Real Madrid	0–0 at Etihad Stadium; 0–1 at Santiago Bernabéu
2016–17	Tottenham Hotspur	3rd in group stage (Transferred to UEL)	N/A	(France) Monaco, (Germany) Bayer Leverkusen, (Russia) CSKA Moscow	
2016–17	Arsenal	Round of 16	2–10	(Germany) Bayern Munich	1–5 at Allianz Arena; 1–5 at Emirates Stadium
2016–17	Manchester City	Round of 16	6–6 (a)	(France) Monaco	5–3 at Etihad Stadium; 1–3 at Stade Louis II
2016–17	Leicester City	Quarter-finals	1–2	(Spain) Atlético Madrid	0–1 at Vicente Calderón; 1–1 at King Power Stadium
2017–18	Chelsea	Round of 16	1–4	(Spain) Barcelona	1–1 at Stamford Bridge; 0–3 at Camp Nou
2017–18	Manchester United	Round of 16	1–2	(Spain) Sevilla	0–0 at Ramón Sánchez Pizjuán; 1–2 at Old Trafford
2017–18	Tottenham Hotspur	Round of 16	3–4	(Italy) Juventus	2–2 at Juventus Stadium; 1–2 at Wembley Stadium
2017–18	Manchester City	Quarter-finals	1–5	(England) Liverpool	0–3 at Anfield; 1–2 at Etihad Stadium
2017–18	Liverpool	Final	1–3	**(Spain) Real Madrid**	NSC Olimpiyskiy Stadium, Kyiv
2018–19	Manchester United	Quarter-finals	0–4	(Spain) Barcelona	0–1 at Old Trafford; 0–3 at Camp Nou
2018–19	Manchester City	Quarter-finals	4–4 (a)	(England) Tottenham Hotspur	0–1 at Tottenham Hotspur Stadium; 4–3 at Etihad Stadium
2018–19	Tottenham Hotspur	Final	0–2	**(England) Liverpool**	Metropolitano Stadium, Madrid
2018–19	Liverpool	**Winners**	2–0	(England) Tottenham Hotspur	Metropolitano Stadium, Madrid
2019–20	Chelsea	Round of 16	1–7	(Germany) **Bayern Munich**	0–3 at Stamford Bridge; 1–4 at Allianz Arena
2019–20	Tottenham Hotspur	Round of 16	0–4	(Germany) RB Leipzig	0–1 at Tottenham Hotspur Stadium; 0–3 at Red Bull Arena
2019–20	Liverpool	Round of 16	2–4	(Spain) Atlético Madrid	0–1 at Metropolitano Stadium; 2–3 at Anfield
2019–20	Manchester City	Quarter-finals	1–3	(France) Lyon	Estádio José Alvalade, Lisbon
2020–21	Manchester United	3rd in group stage (Transferred to UEL)	N/A	(France) Paris Saint-Germain, (Germany) RB Leipzig, (Turkey) İstanbul Başakşehir	
2020–21	Liverpool	Quarter-finals	1–3	(Spain) Real Madrid	1–3 at Alfredo Di Stéfano; 0–0 at Anfield
2020–21	Manchester City	Final	0–1	**(England) Chelsea**	Estádio do Dragão, Porto
2020–21	Chelsea	**Winners**	1–0	(England) Manchester City	Estádio do Dragão, Porto
2021–22	Manchester United	Round of 16	1–2	(Spain) Atlético Madrid	1–1 at Metropolitano Stadium; 0–1 at Old Trafford
2021–22	Chelsea	Quarter-finals	4–5	(Spain) **Real Madrid**	1–3 at Stamford Bridge; 3–2 at Santiago Bernabéu
2021–22	Manchester City	Semi-finals	5–6	(Spain) **Real Madrid**	4–3 at Etihad Stadium; 1–3 at Santiago Bernabéu
2021–22	Liverpool	Final	0–1	(Spain) **Real Madrid**	Stade de France, Saint-Denis
2022–23	Liverpool	Round of 16	2–6	(Spain) Real Madrid	2–5 at Anfield; 0–1 at Santiago Bernabéu
2022–23	Tottenham Hotspur	Round of 16	0–1	(Italy) Milan	0–1 at San Siro; 0–0 at Tottenham Hotspur Stadium
2022–23	Chelsea	Quarter-finals	0–4	(Spain) Real Madrid	0–2 at Santiago Bernabéu; 0–2 at Stamford Bridge
2022–23	Manchester City	**Winners**	1–0	(Italy) Inter Milan	Atatürk Olympic Stadium, Istanbul
2023–24	Manchester United	4th in group stage	N/A	(Germany) Bayern Munich, (Denmark) Copenhagen, (Turkey) Galatasaray	
2023–24	Newcastle United	4th in group stage	N/A	(Germany) Borussia Dortmund, (France) Paris Saint-Germain, (Italy) Milan	
2023–24	Arsenal	Quarter-finals	2–3	(Germany) Bayern Munich	2–2 at Emirates Stadium; 0–1 at Allianz Arena
2023–24	Manchester City	Quarter-finals	4–4 (3–4 p)	(Spain) **Real Madrid**	3–3 at Santiago Bernabéu; 1–1 at Etihad Stadium
2024–25	Manchester City	Knockout phase play-offs	3–6	(Spain) Real Madrid	2–3 at Etihad Stadium; 1–3 at Santiago Bernabéu
2024–25	Liverpool	Round of 16	1–1 (1–4 p)	(France) **Paris Saint-Germain**	1–0 at Parc des Princes; 0–1 at Anfield
2024–25	Aston Villa	Quarter-finals	4–5	(France) **Paris Saint-Germain**	1–3 at Parc des Princes; 3–2 at Villa Park
2024–25	Arsenal	Semi-finals	1–3	(France) **Paris Saint-Germain**	0–1 at Emirates Stadium; 1–2 at Parc des Princes
2025–26	Chelsea	Round of 16	2–8	(France) **Paris Saint-Germain**	2–5 at Parc des Princes; 0–3 at Stamford Bridge
2025–26	Manchester City	Round of 16	1–5	(Spain) Real Madrid	0–3 at Santiago Bernabéu; 1–2 at Etihad Stadium
2025–26	Newcastle United	Round of 16	3–8	(Spain) Barcelona	1–1 at St James' Park; 2–7 at Camp Nou
2025–26	Tottenham Hotspur	Round of 16	5–7	(Spain) Atlético Madrid	2–5 at Metropolitano Stadium; 3–2 at Tottenham Hotspur Stadium
2025–26	Liverpool	Quarter-finals	0–4	(France) **Paris Saint-Germain**	0–2 at Parc des Princes; 0–2 at Anfield
2025–26	Arsenal	Final	1–1 (a.e.t.) (3–4 p)	(France) **Paris Saint-Germain**	Puskás Aréna, Budapest

Note: UEL denotes the UEFA Cup/Europa League.

=== UEFA Cup/Europa League ===
English clubs have won the competition eleven times and reached the final on nine other occasions (including 1972, 2019 and 2025 when both finalists were from England).

Season	Club	Progress	Score	Opponents	Venue(s)
1971–72	Southampton	First round	2–3	(Spain) Athletic Bilbao	2–1 at The Dell; 0–2 at San Mamés
1971–72	Leeds United	First round	2–4	(Belgium) Lierse	2–0 at Lierse; 0–4 at Elland Road
1971–72	Wolverhampton Wanderers	Final	2–3	**(England) Tottenham Hotspur**	1–2 at Molineux; 1–1 at White Hart Lane
1971–72	Tottenham Hotspur	**Winners**	3–2	(England) Wolverhampton Wanderers	2–1 at Molineux; 1–1 at White Hart Lane
1972–73	Manchester City	First round	3–4	(Spain) Valencia	2–2 at Maine Road; 1–2 at Mestalla
1972–73	Stoke City	First round	3–5	(West Germany) 1. FC Kaiserslautern	3–1 at Victoria Ground; 0–4 at Fritz-Walter-Stadion
1972–73	Tottenham Hotspur	Semi-finals	2–2 (a)	**(England) Liverpool**	0–1 at Anfield; 2–1 at White Hart Lane
1972–73	Liverpool	**Winners**	3–2	(West Germany) Borussia Mönchengladbach	3–0 at Anfield; 0–2 at Bökelbergstadion
1973–74	Wolverhampton Wanderers	Second round	4–4 (a)	(East Germany) Lokomotive Leipzig	0–3 at Bruno-Plache-Stadion; 4–1 at Molineux
1973–74	Leeds United	Third round	2–3	(Portugal) Vitória de Setúbal	1–0 at Elland Road; 1–3 at Estádio do Bonfim
1973–74	Ipswich Town	Quarter-finals	1–1 (3–4 p)	(East Germany) Lokomotive Leipzig	1–0 at Portman Road; 0–1 at Bruno-Plache-Stadion
1973–74	Tottenham Hotspur	Final	2–4	**(Netherlands) Feyenoord**	2–2 at White Hart Lane; 0–2 at De Kuip
1974–75	Ipswich Town	First round	3–3 (a)	(Netherlands) Twente	2–2 at Portman Road; 1–1 at Diekman Stadion
1974–75	Stoke City	First round	1–1 (a)	(Netherlands) Ajax	1–1 at Victoria Ground; 0–0 at De Meer Stadion
1974–75	Wolverhampton Wanderers	First round	4–5	(Portugal) Porto	1–4 at Estádio das Antas; 3–1 at Molineux
1974–75	Derby County	Third round	4–5	(Socialist Federal Republic of Yugoslavia) Velež Mostar	3–1 at Baseball Ground; 1–4 at Bijeli Brijeg Stadium
1975–76	Aston Villa	First round	1–5	(Belgium) Royal Antwerp	1–4 at Bosuilstadion; 0–1 at Villa Park
1975–76	Everton	First round	0–1	(Italy) Milan	0–0 at Goodison Park; 0–1 at San Siro
1975–76	Ipswich Town	Second round	3–4	(Belgium) Club Brugge	3–0 at Portman Road; 0–4 at Olympiastadion
1975–76	Liverpool	**Winners**	4–3	(Belgium) Club Brugge	3–2 at Anfield; 1–1 at Olympiastadion
1976–77	Manchester City	First round	1–2	**(Italy) Juventus**	1–0 at Maine Road; 0–2 at Stadio Comunale di Torino
1976–77	Derby County	Second round	2–5	(Greece) AEK Athens	0–2 at Nikos Goumas Stadium; 2–3 at Baseball Ground
1976–77	Manchester United	Second round	1–3	**(Italy) Juventus**	1–0 at Old Trafford; 0–3 at Stadio Comunale di Torino
1976–77	Queens Park Rangers	Quarter-finals	3–3 (6–7 p)	(Greece) AEK Athens	3–0 at Loftus Road; 0–3 at Nikos Goumas Stadium
1977–78	Manchester City	First round	2–2 (a)	(Poland) Widzew Łódź	2–2 at Maine Road; 0–0 at Stadion Widzewa
1977–78	Newcastle United	Second round	2–5	(France) Bastia	1–2 at Stade Armand Cesari; 1–3 at St James' Park
1977–78	Ipswich Town	Third round	3–3 (1–3 p)	(Spain) Barcelona	3–0 at Portman Road; 0–3 at Camp Nou
1977–78	Aston Villa	Quarter-finals	3–4	(Spain) Barcelona	2–2 at Villa Park; 1–2 at Camp Nou
1978–79	Everton	Second round	2–2 (a)	(Czechoslovakia) Dukla Prague	2–1 at Goodison Park; 0–1 at Stadion Juliska
1978–79	Arsenal	Third round	1–2	(Socialist Federal Republic of Yugoslavia) Red Star Belgrade	0–1 at Red Star Stadium; 1–1 at Highbury
1978–79	West Bromwich Albion	Quarter-finals	1–2	(Socialist Federal Republic of Yugoslavia) Red Star Belgrade	0–1 at Red Star Stadium; 1–1 at The Hawthorns
1978–79	Manchester City	Quarter-finals	2–4	(West Germany) Borussia Mönchengladbach	1–1 at Maine Road; 1–3 at Bökelbergstadion
1979–80	West Bromwich Albion	First round	1–4	(East Germany) Carl Zeiss Jena	0–2 at Ernst-Abbe-Sportfeld; 1–2 at The Hawthorns
1979–80	Everton	First round	0–2	(Netherlands) Feyenoord	0–1 at Feyenoord Stadion; 0–1 at Goodison Park
1979–80	Leeds United	Second round	0–4	(Romania) Universitatea Craiova	0–2 at Stadionul Central; 0–2 at Elland Road
1979–80	Ipswich Town	Second round	1–1 (a)	(Switzerland) Grasshopper	0–0 at Hardturm; 1–1 at Portman Road
1980–81	Wolverhampton Wanderers	First round	2–3	(Netherlands) PSV Eindhoven	1–3 at Philips Stadion; 1–0 at Molineux
1980–81	Manchester United	First round	1–1 (a)	(Poland) Widzew Łódź	1–1 at Old Trafford; 0–0 at Stadion Widzewa
1980–81	Ipswich Town	**Winners**	5–4	(Netherlands) AZ	3–0 at Portman Road; 2–4 at Olympic Stadium
1981–82	West Bromwich Albion	First round	1–4	(Switzerland) Grasshopper	0–1 at Hardturm; 1–3 at The Hawthorns
1981–82	Ipswich Town	First round	2–4	(Scotland) Aberdeen	1–1 at Portman Road; 1–3 at Pittodrie Stadium
1981–82	Southampton	Second round	2–4	(Portugal) Sporting CP	2–4 at The Dell; 0–0 at Estádio José Alvalade
1981–82	Arsenal	Second round	2–2 (a)	(Belgium) SV Winterslag	0–1 at Genk; 2–1 at Highbury
1982–83	Arsenal	First round	4–8	(Russia) Spartak Moscow	2–3 at Luzhniki Stadium; 2–5 at Highbury
1982–83	Manchester United	First round	1–2	(Spain) Valencia	0–0 at Old Trafford; 1–2 at Mestalla
1982–83	Ipswich Town	First round	3–4	(Italy) Roma	0–3 at Stadio Olimpico; 3–1 at Portman Road
1982–83	Southampton	First round	2–2 (a)	(Sweden) IFK Norrköping	2–2 at The Dell; 0–0 at Idrottsparken
1983–84	Aston Villa	Second round	3–4	(Soviet Union) Spartak Moscow	2–2 at Luzhniki Stadium; 1–2 at Villa Park
1983–84	Watford	Third round	2–7	(Czechoslovakia) Sparta Prague	2–3 at Vicarage Road; 0–4 at Letná Stadium
1983–84	Nottingham Forest	Semi-finals	2–3	(Belgium) Anderlecht	2–0 at City Ground; 0–3* at Constant Vanden Stock Stadium
1983–84	Tottenham Hotspur	**Winners**	2–2 (4–3 p)	(Belgium) Anderlecht	1–1 at Constant Vanden Stock Stadium; 1–1 at White Hart Lane
1984–85	Nottingham Forest	First round	0–1	(Belgium) Club Brugge	0–0 at City Ground; 0–1 at Olympiastadion
1984–85	Southampton	First round	0–2	(Germany) Hamburger SV	0–0 at The Dell; 0–1 at Volksparkstadion
1984–85	Queens Park Rangers	Second round	6–6 (a)	(Socialist Federal Republic of Yugoslavia) Partizan	6–2 at Highbury; 0–4 at Partizan Stadium
1984–85	Tottenham Hotspur	Quarter-finals	0–1	**(Spain) Real Madrid**	0–1 at White Hart Lane; 0–0 at Santiago Bernabéu
1984–85	Manchester United	Quarter-finals	1–1 (4–5 p)	(Hungary) Videoton	1–0 at Old Trafford; 0–1 at Stadion Sostoi
1985–86	Banned				
1986–87	Banned				
1987–88	Banned				
1988–89	Banned				
1989–90	Banned				
1990–91 (Note: England had no coefficient points as a result of the Heysel ban, so only one club was granted entry.)	Aston Villa	Second round	2–3	**(Italy) Inter Milan**	2–0 at Villa Park; 0–3 at San Siro
1991–92 (Note: England had only one year of coefficient points as a result of the Heysel ban, so only one club was granted entry.)	Liverpool	Quarter-finals	1–4	(Italy) Genoa	0–2 at Stadio Luigi Ferraris; 1–2 at Anfield
1992–93 (Note: England had only two years of coefficient points as a result of the Heysel ban, so only two clubs were granted entry.)	Manchester United	First round	0–0 (3–4 p)	(Russia) Torpedo Moscow	0–0 at Old Trafford; 0–0 at Luzhniki Stadium
1992–93	Sheffield Wednesday	Second round	3–5	(Germany) 1. FC Kaiserslautern	1–3 at Fritz Walter Stadion; 2–2 at Hillsborough Stadium
1993–94 (Note: England had only three years of coefficient points as a result of the Heysel ban, so only two clubs were granted entry.)	Aston Villa	Second round	1–2	(Spain) Deportivo La Coruña	1–1 at Estadio Riazor; 0–1 at Villa Park
1993–94	Norwich City	Third round	0–2	(Italy) **Inter Milan**	0–1 at Carrow Road; 0–1 at San Siro
1994–95 (Note: England had only four years of coefficient points as a result of the Heysel ban, so only three clubs were granted entry.)	Blackburn Rovers	First round	2–3	(Sweden) Trelleborgs FF	0–1 at Ewood Park; 2–2 at Vångavallen
1994–95	Newcastle United	Second round	3–3 (a)	(Spain) Athletic Bilbao	3–2 at St James' Park; 0-1 at San Mamés
1994–95	Aston Villa	Second round	2–2 (a)	(Turkey) Trabzonspor	0–1 at Hüseyin Avni Aker Stadium; 2–1 at Villa Park
1995–96 (Note: England had the full five years of coefficient points but the limited berths from previous seasons affected their ranking, leaving them with three entrants. The introduction of the UEFA Intertoto Cup and the UEFA Fair Play ranking for 1995–96 allowed more UEFA Cup berths to open up.)	Manchester United	First round	2–2 (a)	(Russia) Rotor Volgograd	0–0 at Rotor Stadium; 2–2 at Old Trafford
1995–96	Liverpool	Second round	0–1	(Denmark) Brøndby	0–0 at Brøndby Stadium; 0–1 at Anfield
1995–96	Leeds United	Second round	3–8	(Netherlands) PSV Eindhoven	3–5 at Elland Road; 0–3 at Philips Stadion
1995–96	Nottingham Forest	Quarter-finals	2–7	(Germany) Bayern Munich	1–2 at Olympic Stadium; 1–5 at City Ground
1996–97 (Note: England initially gained a UEFA Cup berth through the UEFA Fair Play ranking but it was revoked as punishment for its clubs fielding weakened teams in the 1995 UEFA Intertoto Cup.)	Arsenal	First round	4–6	(Germany) Borussia Mönchengladbach	2–3 at Highbury; 2–3 at Müngersdorfer Stadion
1996–97	Aston Villa	First round	1–1 (a)	(Sweden) Helsingborgs IF	1–1 at Villa Park; 0–0 at Olympia
1996–97	Newcastle United	Quarter-finals	0–4	(France) Monaco	0–1 at St James' Park; 0–3 at Stade Louis II
1997–98	Arsenal	First round	1–2	(Greece) PAOK	0–1 at Toumba Stadium; 1–1 at Highbury
1997–98	Leicester City	First round	1–4	(Spain) Atlético Madrid	1–2 at Vicente Calderón; 0–2 at Filbert Street
1997–98	Liverpool	Second round	2–3	(France) Strasbourg	0–3 at Stade de la Meinau; 2–0 at Anfield
1997–98	Aston Villa	Quarter-finals	2–2 (a)	(Spain) Atlético Madrid	0–1 at Vicente Calderón; 2–1 at Villa Park
1998–99	Blackburn Rovers	First round	2–3	(France) Lyon	0–1 at Ewood Park; 2–2 at Stade de Gerland
1998–99	Leeds United	Second round	0–1	(Italy) Roma	0–1 at Stadio Olimpico; 0–0 at Elland Road
1998–99	Aston Villa	Second round	2–3	(Spain) Celta Vigo	1–0 at Villa Park; 1–3 at Balaídos
1998–99	Liverpool	Third round	2–3	(Spain) Celta Vigo	1–3 at Balaídos; 1–0 at Anfield
1999–2000	West Ham United	Second round	0–2	(Romania) Steaua București	0–2 at Stadionul Steaua; 0–0 at Boleyn Ground
1999–2000	Tottenham Hotspur	Second round	1–2	(Germany) 1. FC Kaiserslautern	1–0 at White Hart Lane; 0–2 at Fritz Walter Stadion
1999–2000	Newcastle United	Third round	0–1	(Italy) Roma	0–1 at Stadio Olimpico; 0–0 at St James' Park
1999–2000	Leeds United	Semi-finals	2–4	**(Turkey) Galatasaray**	0–2 at Ali Sami Yen Stadium; 2–2 at Elland Road
1999–2000	Arsenal	Final	0–0 (a.e.t.) (1–4 p)	**(Turkey) Galatasaray**	Parken Stadium, Copenhagen
2000–01	Leicester City	First round	2–4	(Socialist Federal Republic of Yugoslavia) Red Star Belgrade	1–1 at Filbert Street; 1–3 at Wien
2000–01	Chelsea	First round	1–2	(Switzerland) St. Gallen	1–0 at Stamford Bridge; 0–2 at Espenmoos
2000–01	Liverpool	**Winners**	5–4 (g.g.)	(Spain) Alavés	Westfalenstadion, Dortmund
2001–02	Aston Villa	First round	3–3 (a)	(Croatia) Varteks	2–3 at Villa Park; 1–0 at Stadion Varteks
2001–02	Chelsea	Second round	1–3	(Israel) Hapoel Tel Aviv	0–2 at Bloomfield Stadium; 1–1 at Stamford Bridge
2001–02	Ipswich Town	Third round	2–4	(Italy) Inter Milan	1–0 at Portman Road; 1–4 at San Siro
2001–02	Leeds United	Fourth round	0–1	(Netherlands) PSV Eindhoven	0–0 at Philips Stadion; 0–1 at Elland Road
2002–03	Chelsea	First round	4–5	(Norway) Viking	2–1 at Stamford Bridge; 2–4 at Stavanger Stadion
2002–03	Ipswich Town	Second round	1–1 (2–4 p)	(Czech Republic) Slovan Liberec	1–0 at Portman Road; 0–1 at U Nisy Stadium
2002–03	Blackburn Rovers	Second round	0–3	(Scotland) Celtic	0–1 at Celtic Park; 0–2 at Ewood Park
2002–03	Leeds United	Third round	1–2	(Spain) Málaga	0–0 at La Rosaleda; 1–2 at Elland Road
2002–03	Fulham	Third round	1–2	(Germany) Hertha BSC	1–2 at Olympic Stadium; 0–0 at Craven Cottage
2002–03	Liverpool	Quarter-finals	1–3	(Scotland) Celtic	1–1 at Celtic Park; 0–2 at Anfield
2003–04	Blackburn Rovers	First round	2–4	(Turkey) Gençlerbirliği	1–3 at Ankara 19 Mayıs Stadium; 1–1 at Ewood Park
2003–04	Southampton	First round	1–2	(Romania) Steaua București	1–1 at St Mary's Stadium; 0–1 at Stadionul Steaua
2003–04	Manchester City	Second round	1–1 (a)	(Poland) Dyskobolia Grodzisk Wielkopolski	1–1 at City of Manchester Stadium; 0–0 at Stadion Dyskobolia
2003–04	Liverpool	Fourth round	2–3	(France) Marseille	1–1 at Anfield; 1–2 at Stade Vélodrome
2003–04	Newcastle United	Semi-finals	0–2	(France) Marseille	0–0 at St James' Park; 0–2 at Stade Vélodrome
2004–05	Millwall	First round	2–4	(Hungary) Ferencváros	1–1 at The Den; 1–3 at Stadion Albert Flórián
2004–05	Middlesbrough	Round of 16	2–4	(Portugal) Sporting CP	2–3 at Riverside Stadium; 0–1 at Estádio José Alvalade
2004–05	Newcastle United	Quarter-finals	2–4	(Portugal) Sporting CP	1–0 at St James' Park; 1–4 at Estádio José Alvalade
2005–06	Everton	First round	2–5	(Romania) Dinamo București	1–5 at Stadionul Dinamo; 1–0 at Goodison Park
2005–06	Bolton Wanderers	Round of 32	1–2	(France) Marseille	0–0 at Reebok Stadium; 1–2 at Stade Vélodrome
2005–06	Middlesbrough	Final	0–4	(Spain) Sevilla	Philips Stadion, Eindhoven
2006–07	West Ham United	First round	0–4	(Italy) Palermo	0–1 at Boleyn Ground; 0–3 at Stadio Renzo Barbera
2006–07	Blackburn Rovers	Round of 32	2–3	(Germany) Bayer Leverkusen	2–3 at BayArena; 0–0 at Ewood Park
2006–07	Newcastle United	Round of 16	4–4 (a)	(Netherlands) AZ	4–2 at St James' Park; 0–2 at DSB Stadion
2006–07	Tottenham Hotspur	Quarter-finals	3–4	(Spain) Sevilla	1–2 at Ramón Sánchez Pizjuán; 2–2 at White Hart Lane
2007–08	Blackburn Rovers	First round	2–3	(Greece) AEL	0–2 at Alcazar Stadium; 2–1 at Ewood Park
2007–08	Everton	Round of 16	2–2 (2–4 p)	(Italy) Fiorentina	0–2 at Stadio Artemio Franchi; 2–0 at Goodison Park
2007–08	Bolton Wanderers	Round of 16	1–2	(Portugal) Sporting CP	1–1 at Reebok Stadium; 0–1 at Estádio José Alvalade
2007–08	Tottenham Hotspur	Round of 16	1–1 (5–6 p)	(Netherlands) PSV Eindhoven	0–1 at White Hart Lane; 1–0 at Philips Stadion
2008–09	Everton	First round	3–4	(Belgium) Standard Liège	2–2 at Goodison Park; 1–2 at Stade Maurice Dufrasne
2008–09	Portsmouth	Group stage	N/A	(Germany) VfL Wolfsburg, (Italy) Milan, (Portugal) Braga, (Netherlands) Heerenveen	
2008–09	Aston Villa	Round of 32	1–3	(Russia) CSKA Moscow	1–1 at Villa Park; 0–2 at Luzhniki Stadium
2008–09	Tottenham Hotspur	Round of 32	1–3	(Ukraine) Shakhtar Donetsk	0–2 at Donbas Arena; 1–1 at White Hart Lane
2008–09	Manchester City	Quarter-finals	3–4	(Germany) Hamburger SV	1–3 at HSH Nordbank Arena; 2–1 at City of Manchester Stadium
2009–10	Aston Villa	Play-off round	2–2 (a)	(Austria) Rapid Wien	0–1 at Gerhard Hanappi Stadium; 2–1 at Villa Park
2009–10	Everton	Round of 32	2–4	(Portugal) Sporting CP	2–1 at Goodison Park; 0–3 at Estádio José Alvalade
2009–10	Liverpool	Semi-finals	2–2 (a)	**(Spain) Atlético Madrid**	0–1 at Vicente Calderón; 2–1 at Anfield
2009–10	Fulham	Final	1–2 (a.e.t.)	**(Spain) Atlético Madrid**	HSH Nordbank Arena, Hamburg
2010–11	Aston Villa	Play-off round	3–4	(Austria) Rapid Wien	1–1 at Gerhard Hanappi Stadium; 2–3 at Villa Park
2010–11	Liverpool	Round of 16	0–1	(Portugal) Braga	0–1 at Estádio Municipal de Braga; 0–0 at Anfield
2010–11	Manchester City	Round of 16	1–2	(Ukraine) Dynamo Kyiv	0–2 at Valeriy Lobanovskyi Dynamo Stadium; 1–0 at Etihad Stadium
2011–12	Tottenham Hotspur	3rd in group stage	N/A	(Greece) PAOK, (Russia) Rubin Kazan, (Republic of Ireland) Shamrock Rovers	
2011–12	Birmingham City	3rd in group stage	N/A	(Belgium) Club Brugge, (Portugal) Braga, (Slovenia) Maribor	
2011–12	Fulham	3rd in group stage	N/A	(Netherlands) Twente, (Poland) Wisła Kraków, (Denmark) Odense	
2011–12	Stoke City	Round of 32	0–2	(Spain) Valencia	0–1 at Britannia Stadium; 0–1 at Mestalla
2011–12	Manchester United	Round of 16	3–5	(Spain) Athletic Bilbao	2–3 at Old Trafford; 1–2 at San Mamés
2011–12	Manchester City	Round of 16	3–3 (a)	(Portugal) Sporting CP	0–1 at Estádio José Alvalade; 3–2 at Etihad Stadium
2012–13	Liverpool	Round of 32	3–3 (a)	(Russia) Zenit Saint Petersburg	0–2 at Petrovsky Stadium; 3–1 at Anfield
2012–13	Newcastle United	Quarter-finals	2–4	(Portugal) Benfica	1–3 at Estádio da Luz; 1–1 at St James' Park
2012–13	Tottenham Hotspur	Quarter-finals	4–4 (1–4 p)	(Switzerland) Basel	2–2 at White Hart Lane; 2–2 at St. Jakob-Park
2012–13	Chelsea	**Winners**	2–1	(Portugal) Benfica	Amsterdam Arena, Amsterdam
2013–14	Wigan Athletic	4th in group stage	N/A	(Russia) Rubin Kazan, (Slovenia) Maribor, (Belgium) Zulte Waregem	
2013–14	Swansea City	Round of 32	1–3	(Italy) Napoli	0–0 at Liberty Stadium; 1–3 at Stadio San Paolo
2013–14	Tottenham Hotspur	Round of 16	3–5	(Portugal) Benfica	1–3 at White Hart Lane; 2–2 at Estádio da Luz
2014–15	Hull City	Play-off round	2–2 (a)	(Belgium) Lokeren	0–1 at Daknamstadion; 2–1 at KC Stadium
2014–15	Tottenham Hotspur	Round of 32	1–3	(Italy) Fiorentina	1–1 White Hart Lane; 0–2 at Stadio Artemio Franchi
2014–15	Liverpool	Round of 32	1–1 (4–5 p)	(Turkey) Beşiktaş	1–0 at Anfield; 0–1 at Atatürk Olympic Stadium
2014–15	Everton	Round of 16	4–6	(Ukraine) Dynamo Kyiv	2–1 at Goodison Park; 2–5 at Olympic Stadium
2015–16	West Ham United	Third qualifying round	3–4	(Romania) Astra Giurgiu	2–2 at Boleyn Ground; 1–2 at Stadionul Marin Anastasovici
2015–16	Southampton	Play-off round	1–2	(Denmark) Midtjylland	1–1 at St Mary's Stadium; 0–1 at MCH Arena
2015–16	Tottenham Hotspur	Round of 16	1–5	(Germany) Borussia Dortmund	0–3 at Signal Iduna Park; 1–2 at White Hart Lane
2015–16	Manchester United	Round of 16	1–3	(England) Liverpool	0–2 at Anfield; 1–1 at Old Trafford
2015–16	Liverpool	Final	1–3	**(Spain) Sevilla**	St. Jakob-Park, Basel
2016–17	West Ham United	Play-off round	1–2	(Romania) Astra Giurgiu	1–1 at Stadionul Marin Anastasovici; 0–1 at Olympic Stadium
2016–17	Southampton	3rd in group stage	N/A	(Czech Republic) Sparta Prague, (Israel) Hapoel Be'er Sheva, (Italy) Inter Milan	
2016–17	Tottenham Hotspur	Round of 32	2–3	(Belgium) Gent	0–1 at Ghelamco Arena; 2–2 at Wembley Stadium
2016–17	Manchester United	**Winners**	2–0	(Netherlands) Ajax	Friends Arena, Stockholm
2017–18	Everton	3rd in group stage	N/A	(Italy) Atalanta, (France) Lyon, (Cyprus) Apollon Limassol	
2017–18	Arsenal	Semi-finals	1–2	**(Spain) Atlético Madrid**	1–1 at Emirates Stadium; 0–1 at Wanda Metropolitano
2018–19	Burnley	Play-off round	2–4	(Greece) Olympiacos	1–3 at Karaiskakis Stadium; 1–1 at Turf Moor
2018–19	Arsenal	Final	1–4	**(England) Chelsea**	Baku Olympic Stadium, Baku
2018–19	Chelsea	**Winners**	4–1	(England) Arsenal	Baku Olympic Stadium, Baku
2019–20	Arsenal	Round of 32	2–2 (a)	(Greece) Olympiacos	1–0 at Karaiskakis Stadium; 1–2 at Emirates Stadium
2019–20	Wolverhampton Wanderers	Quarter-finals	0–1	(Spain) **Sevilla**	MSV-Arena, Duisburg
2019–20	Manchester United	Semi-finals	1–2	(Spain) **Sevilla**	RheinEnergieStadion, Cologne
2020–21	Leicester City	Round of 32	0–2	(Czech Republic) Slavia Prague	0–0 at Sinobo Stadium; 0–2 at King Power Stadium
2020–21	Tottenham Hotspur	Round of 16	2–3	(Croatia) Dinamo Zagreb	2–0 at Tottenham Hotspur Stadium; 0–3 at Stadion Maksimir
2020–21	Arsenal	Semi-finals	1–2	(Spain) **Villarreal**	1–2 at Estadio de la Cerámica; 0–0 at Emirates Stadium
2020–21	Manchester United	Final	1–1 (a.e.t.) (10–11 p)	(Spain) **Villarreal**	Stadion Miejski, Gdańsk
2021–22	Leicester City	3rd in group stage (Transferred to UECL)	N/A	(Russia) Spartak Moscow, (Italy) Napoli, (Poland) Legia Warsaw	
2021–22	West Ham United	Semi-finals	1–3	(Germany) **Eintracht Frankfurt**	1–2 at London Stadium; 0–1 at Waldstadion
2022–23	Arsenal	Round of 16	3–3 (3–5 p)	(Portugal) Sporting CP	2–2 at Estádio José Alvalade; 1–1 at Emirates Stadium
2022–23	Manchester United	Quarter-finals	2–5	(Spain) **Sevilla**	2–2 at Old Trafford; 0–3 at Ramón Sánchez Pizjuán
2023–24	Brighton & Hove Albion	Round of 16	1–4	(Italy) Roma	0–4 at Stadio Olimpico; 1–0 at Falmer Stadium
2023–24	Liverpool	Quarter-finals	1–3	(Italy) **Atalanta**	0–3 at Anfield; 1–0 at Stadio Atleti Azzurri d'Italia
2023–24	West Ham United	Quarter-finals	1–3	(Germany) Bayer Leverkusen	0–2 at BayArena; 1–1 at London Stadium
2024–25	Manchester United	Final	0–1	**(England) Tottenham Hotspur**	San Mamés, Bilbao
2024–25	Tottenham Hotspur	**Winners**	1–0	(England) Manchester United	San Mamés, Bilbao
2025–26	Nottingham Forest	Semi-finals	1–4	(England) **Aston Villa**	1–0 at City Ground; 0–4 at Villa Park
2025–26	Aston Villa	**Winners**	3–0	(Germany) SC Freiburg	Beşiktaş Stadium, Istanbul

Note: UECL denotes the UEFA Europa Conference League/Conference League.

=== UEFA Conference League ===
English clubs have won the competition three times.

Season	Club	Progress	Score	Opponents	Venue(s)
2021–22	Tottenham Hotspur	3rd in group stage	N/A	(France) Rennes, (Netherlands) Vitesse, (Slovenia) Mura	
2021–22	Leicester City	Semi-finals	1–2	(Italy) **Roma**	1–1 at King Power Stadium; 0–1 at Stadio Olimpico
2022–23	West Ham United	**Winners**	2–1	(Italy) Fiorentina	Fortuna Arena, Prague
2023–24	Aston Villa	Semi-finals	2–6	(Greece) **Olympiacos**	2–4 at Villa Park; 0–2 at Karaiskakis Stadium
2024–25	Chelsea	**Winners**	4–1	(Spain) Real Betis	Wrocław Stadium, Wrocław
2025–26	Crystal Palace	**Winners**	1–0	(Spain) Rayo Vallecano	Red Bull Arena, Leipzig

=== European/UEFA Super Cup ===
English clubs have won the competition ten times and taken part on twelve other occasions (only two clubs qualify).

Year	Club	Progress	Score	Opponents	Venue(s)
1977	Liverpool	**Winners**	7–1	(West Germany) Hamburger SV	1–1 at Volksparkstadion; 6–0 at Anfield
1978	Liverpool	Runners-up	3–4	(Belgium) **Anderlecht**	1–3 at Parc Astrid; 2–1 at Anfield
1979	Nottingham Forest	**Winners**	2–1	(Spain) Barcelona	1–0 at City Ground; 1–1 at Camp Nou
1980	Nottingham Forest	Runners-up	2–2 (a)	(Spain) **Valencia**	2–1 at City Ground; 0–1 at Estadio Luís Casanova
1981	(Liverpool) – no match played v Dinamo Tbilisi				
1982	Aston Villa	**Winners**	3–1	(Spain) Barcelona	0–1 at Camp Nou; 3–0 at Villa Park
1984	Liverpool	Runners-up	0–2	(Italy) **Juventus**	Stadio Comunale, Turin
1985	Banned (Everton) – no match played v Juventus				
1991	Manchester United	**Winners**	1–0	(Socialist Federal Republic of Yugoslavia) Red Star Belgrade	Old Trafford, Manchester
1994	Arsenal	Runners-up	0–2	(Italy) **Milan**	0–0 at Highbury; 0–2 at San Siro
1998	Chelsea	**Winners**	1–0	(Spain) Real Madrid	Stade Louis II, Monte Carlo
1999	Manchester United	Runners-up	0–1	(Italy) **Lazio**	Stade Louis II, Monte Carlo
2001	Liverpool	**Winners**	3–2	(Germany) Bayern Munich	Stade Louis II, Monte Carlo
2005	Liverpool	**Winners**	3–1 (a.e.t.)	(Russia) CSKA Moscow	Stade Louis II, Monte Carlo
2008	Manchester United	Runners-up	1–2	(Russia) **Zenit Saint Petersburg**	Stade Louis II, Monte Carlo
2012	Chelsea	Runners-up	1–4	(Spain) **Atlético Madrid**	Stade Louis II, Monte Carlo
2013	Chelsea	Runners-up	2–2 (a.e.t.) (4–5 p)	(Germany) **Bayern Munich**	Eden Aréna, Prague
2017	Manchester United	Runners-up	1–2	(Spain) **Real Madrid**	Philip II Arena, Skopje
2019	Chelsea	Runners-up	2–2 (a.e.t.) (4–5 p)	(England) **Liverpool**	Vodafone Park, Istanbul
2019	Liverpool	**Winners**	2–2 (a.e.t.) (5–4 p)	(England) Chelsea	Vodafone Park, Istanbul
2021	Chelsea	**Winners**	1–1 (a.e.t.) (6–5 p)	(Spain) Villarreal	Windsor Park, Belfast
2023	Manchester City	**Winners**	1–1 (5–4 p)	(Spain) Sevilla	Karaiskakis Stadium, Piraeus
2025	Tottenham Hotspur	Runners-up	2–2 (3–4 p)	(France) **Paris Saint-Germain**	Stadio Friuli, Udine
2026	Aston Villa	Runners-up	1–2	(France) **Paris Saint-Germain**	Red Bull Arena, Salzburg

=== European/UEFA Cup Winners' Cup ===
English clubs won the now defunct competition a record eight times and reached the final on five other occasions.

Season	Club	Progress	Score	Opponents	Venue(s)
1960–61	Wolverhampton Wanderers	Semi-finals	1–3	(Scotland) Rangers	0–2 at Ibrox Park; 1–1 at Molineux Stadium
1961–62	Leicester City	First round	1–3	**(Spain) Atlético Madrid**	1–1 at Filbert Street; 0–2 at Estadio Metropolitano
1962–63	Tottenham Hotspur	**Winners**	5–1	(Spain) Atlético Madrid	De Kuip, Rotterdam
1963–64	Tottenham Hotspur	Second round	3–4	(England) Manchester United	2–0 at Parc Lescure; 1–4 at Old Trafford
1963–64	Manchester United	Quarter-finals	4–6	**(Portugal) Sporting CP**	4–1 at Old Trafford; 0–5 at Estádio José Alvalade
1964–65	West Ham United	**Winners**	2–0	(West Germany) 1860 Munich	Wembley, London
1965–66	West Ham United	Semi-finals	2–5	**(West Germany) Borussia Dortmund**	1–2 at Boleyn Ground; 1–3 at Stadion Rote Erde
1965–66	Liverpool	Final	1–2 (a.e.t.)	**(West Germany) Borussia Dortmund**	Hampden Park, Glasgow
1966–67	Everton	Second round	1–2	(Spain) Zaragoza	0–2 at La Romareda; 1–0 at Goodison Park
1967–68	Tottenham Hotspur	Second round	4–4 (a)	(France) Lyon	0–1 at Parc Lescure; 4–3 at White Hart Lane
1968–69	West Bromwich Albion	Quarter-finals	0–1	(Scotland) Dunfermline Athletic	0–0 at The Hawthorns; 0–1 at East End Park
1969–70	Manchester City	**Winners**	2–1	(Poland) Górnik Zabrze	Praterstadion, Vienna
1970–71	Manchester City	Semi-finals	1–3	(England) **Chelsea**	0–1 at Stamford Bridge; 0–1 at Maine Road
1970–71	Chelsea	**Winners**	1–1 (a.e.t.); 2–1 (replay)	(Spain) Real Madrid	Both at Karaiskakis Stadium, Piraeus
1971–72	Chelsea	Second round	1–1 (a)	(Sweden) Åtvidaberg	0–0 at Kopparvallen; 1–1 at Stamford Bridge
1971–72	Liverpool	Second round	1–3	(West Germany) Bayern Munich	0–0 at Anfield; 1–3 at Grünwalder Stadion
1972–73	Leeds United	Final	0–1	(Italy) **Milan**	Kaftanzoglio Stadium, Thessaloniki
1973–74	Sunderland	Second round	2–3	(Portugal) Sporting CP	2–1 at Roker Park; 0–2 at Estádio José Alvalade
1974–75	Liverpool	Second round	1–1 (a)	(Hungary) Ferencváros	1–1 at Anfield; 0–0 at Stadion Albert Flórián
1975–76	West Ham United	Final	2–4	**(Belgium) Anderlecht**	Heysel Stadium, Brussels
1976–77	Southampton	Quarter-finals	2–3	(Belgium) Anderlecht	0–2 at Émile Versé Stadium; 2–1 at The Dell
1977–78	Manchester United	Second round	5–6	(Portugal) Porto	0–4 at Estadio Das Antas; 5–2 at Old Trafford
1978–79	Ipswich Town	Quarter-finals	2–2 (a)	**(Spain) Barcelona**	2–1 at Portman Road; 0–1 at Camp Nou
1979–80	Arsenal	Final	0–0 (a.e.t.) (4–5 p)	**(Spain) Valencia**	Heysel Stadium, Brussels
1980–81	West Ham United	Quarter-finals	2–4	**(Soviet Union) Dinamo Tbilisi**	1–4 at Boleyn Ground; 1–0 at Lenin Dinamo Stadium
1981–82	Tottenham Hotspur	Semi-finals	1–2	**(Spain) Barcelona**	1–1 at White Hart Lane; 0–1 at Camp Nou
1982–83	Tottenham Hotspur	Second round	2–5	(West Germany) Bayern Munich	1–1 at White Hart Lane; 1–4 at Olympiastadion
1983–84	Manchester United	Semi-finals	2–3	**(Italy) Juventus**	1–1 at Old Trafford; 1–2 at Stadio Comunale
1984–85	Everton	**Winners**	2–1	(Austria) Rapid Wien	De Kuip, Rotterdam
1985–86	Banned				
1986–87	Banned				
1987–88	Banned				
1988–89	Banned				
1989–90	Banned				
1990–91	Manchester United	**Winners**	2–1	(Spain) Barcelona	De Kuip, Rotterdam
1991–92	Manchester United	Second round	1–4	(Spain) Atlético Madrid	0–3 at Vicente Calderon; 1–1 at Old Trafford
1991–92	Tottenham Hotspur	Quarter-finals	0–1	(Netherlands) Feyenoord	0–1 at De Kuip; 0–0 at White Hart Lane
1992–93	Liverpool	Second round	2–6	(Russia) Spartak Moscow	2–4 at Luzhniki; 0–2 at Anfield
1993–94	Arsenal	**Winners**	1–0	(Italy) Parma	Parken, Copenhagen
1994–95	Chelsea	Semi-finals	3–4	**(Spain) Zaragoza**	0–3 at La Romareda; 3–1 at Stamford Bridge
1994–95	Arsenal	Final	1–2 (a.e.t.)	**(Spain) Zaragoza**	Parc des Princes, Paris
1995–96	Everton	Second round	0–1	(Netherlands) Feyenoord	0–0 at Goodison Park; 0–1 at De Kuip
1996–97	Liverpool	Semi-finals	2–3	(France) Paris Saint-Germain	0–3 at Parc des Princes; 2–0 at Anfield
1997–98	Chelsea	**Winners**	1–0	(Germany) VfB Stuttgart	Råsunda Stadium, Stockholm
1998–99	Newcastle United	First round	2–2 (a)	(Federal Republic of Yugoslavia) Partizan	2–1 at St James' Park; 0–1 at Partizan Stadium
1998–99	Chelsea	Semi-finals	1–2	(Spain) Mallorca	1–1 at Stamford Bridge; 0–1 at Estadio Lluís Sitjar

=== Inter-Cities Fairs Cup ===
English clubs won the now defunct competition four times and reached the final on four other occasions.

Season	Club	Progress	Score	Opponents	Venue(s)
1955–58	Birmingham City	Semi-finals	4–4; 1–2 (play-off)	**(Spain) Barcelona**	4–3 at St Andrew's; 0–1 at Camp Nou; Play-off at St. Jakob Stadium, Basel
1955–58	London XI	Final	2–8	**(Spain) Barcelona**	2–2 at Stamford Bridge; 0–6 at Camp Nou
1958–60	Chelsea	Quarter-finals	2–4	(Socialist Federal Republic of Yugoslavia) Belgrade XI	1–0 at Stamford Bridge; 1–4 at Belgrade
1958–60	Birmingham City	Final	1–4	**(Spain) Barcelona**	0–0 at St Andrew's; 1–4 at Camp Nou
1960–61	Birmingham City	Final	2–4	**(Italy) Roma**	2–2 at St Andrew's; 0–2 at Stadio Olimpico
1961–62	Nottingham Forest	First round	1–7	**(Spain) Valencia**	0–2 at Mestalla; 1–5 at City Ground
1961–62	Birmingham City	Second round	3–5	(Spain) Espanyol	2–5 at Estadi de Sarrià; 1–0 at St Andrew's
1961–62	Sheffield Wednesday	Quarter-finals	3–4	(Spain) Barcelona	3–2 at Hillsborough Stadium; 0–2 at Camp Nou
1962–63	Everton	First round	1–2	(Scotland) Dunfermline Athletic	1–0 at Goodison Park; 0–2 at East End Park
1963–64	Arsenal	Second round	2–4	(Belgium) RFC Liège	1–1 at Highbury; 1–3 at Liège
1963–64	Sheffield Wednesday	Second round	3–5	(West Germany) 1. FC Köln	2–3 at Müngersdorfer Stadion; 1–2 at Hillsborough Stadium
1964–65	Everton	Third round	2–3	(England) Manchester United	1–1 at Old Trafford; 1–2 at Goodison Park
1964–65	Manchester United	Semi-finals	3–3; 1–2 (play-off)	**(Hungary) Ferencváros**	3–2 at Old Trafford; 0–1 at Stadion Albert Flórián; Play-off at Stadion Albert Flórián
1965–66	Everton	Second round	2–4	(Hungary) Újpesti Dozsa	0–3 at Szusza Ferenc Stadium; 2–1 at Goodison Park
1965–66	Chelsea	Semi-finals	2–2; 0–5 (play-off)	**(Spain) Barcelona**	0–2 at Camp Nou; 2–0 at Stamford Bridge; Play-off at Camp Nou
1965–66	Leeds United	Semi-finals	2–2; 1–3 (play-off)	(Spain) Zaragoza	0–1 at La Romareda; 2–1 at Elland Road; Play-off at Elland Road
1966–67	West Bromwich Albion	Third round	1–6	(Italy) Bologna	0–3 at Stadio Renato Dall'Ara; 1–3 at The Hawthorns
1966–67	Burnley	Quarter-finals	2–3	(West Germany) Eintracht Frankfurt	1–1 at Waldstadion; 1–2 at Turf Moor
1966–67	Leeds United	Final	0–2	**(Socialist Federal Republic of Yugoslavia) Dinamo Zagreb**	0–2 at Maksimir Stadium; 0–0 at Elland Road
1967–68	Nottingham Forest	Second round	2–2 (a)	(Switzerland) Zürich	2–1 at City Ground; 0–1 at Letzigrund
1967–68	Liverpool	Third round	0–2	(Hungary) Ferencváros	0–1 at Stadion Albert Flórián; 0–1 at Anfield
1967–68	Leeds United	**Winners**	1–0	(Hungary) Ferencváros	1–0 at Elland Road; 0–0 at Népstadion
1968–69	Liverpool	First round	3–3 (coin toss)	(Spain) Athletic Bilbao	1–2 at San Mamés; 2–1 at Anfield
1968–69	Chelsea	Second round	0–0 (coin toss)	(Netherlands) DWS	0–0 at Stamford Bridge; 0–0 at Spieringhorn
1968–69	Leeds United	Quarter-finals	0–3	(Hungary) Újpesti Dozsa	0–1 at Elland Road; 0–2 at Szusza Ferenc Stadium
1968–69	Newcastle United	**Winners**	6–2	(Hungary) Újpesti Dozsa	3–0 at St James' Park; 3–2 at Szusza Ferenc Stadium
1969–70	Liverpool	Second round	3–3 (a)	(Portugal) Vitória de Setúbal	0–1 at Estádio do Bonfim; 3–2 at Anfield
1969–70	Southampton	Third round	1–1 (a)	(England) Newcastle United	0–0 at St James' Park; 1–1 at The Dell
1969–70	Newcastle United	Quarter-finals	3–3 (a)	(Belgium) Anderlecht	0–2 at Parc Astrid; 3–1 at St James' Park
1969–70	Arsenal	**Winners**	4–3	(Belgium) Anderlecht	1–3 at Parc Astrid; 3–0 at Highbury
1970–71	Coventry City	Second round	3–7	(West Germany) Bayern Munich	1–6 at Grünwalder Stadion; 2–1 at Highfield Road
1970–71	Newcastle United	Second round	2–2 (2–5 p)	(Hungary) Pécsi Dózsa	2–0 at St James' Park; 0–2 at Stadion PMFC
1970–71	Arsenal	Quarter-finals	2–2 (a)	(West Germany) 1. FC Köln	2–1 at Highbury; 0–1 at Müngersdorfer Stadion
1970–71	Liverpool	Semi-finals	0–1	**(England) Leeds United**	0–1 at Anfield; 0–0 at Elland Road
1970–71	Leeds United	**Winners**	3–3 (a)	(Italy) Juventus	2–2 at Stadio Comunale di Torino; 1–1 at Elland Road

==== Inter-Cities Fairs Cup Trophy play-off ====
Single match play-off between the most successful clubs to decide the permanent keepers of the trophy. Leeds lost to Barcelona.

Season	Club	Progress	Score	Opponents	Venue(s)
1971	Leeds United	Runners-up	1–2	(Spain) **Barcelona**	Camp Nou

=== UEFA Intertoto Cup ===
English clubs won the now defunct competition four times.

Year	Club	Progress	Score	Opponents	Venue(s)
1995	Sheffield Wednesday	2nd in group stage	N/A	(Germany) Karlsruher SC, (Switzerland) Basel, (Denmark) AGF, (Poland) Górnik Zabrze	
1995	Tottenham Hotspur	4th in group stage	N/A	(Germany) 1. FC Köln, (Switzerland) Luzern, (Sweden) Östers IF, (Slovenia) Rudar Velenje	
1995	Wimbledon	4th in group stage	N/A	(Turkey) Bursaspor, (Slovakia) Košice, (Belgium) Charleroi, (Israel) Beitar Jerusalem	
1996	No entrants				
1997	No entrants				
1998	Crystal Palace	Third round	0–4	(Turkey) Samsunspor	0–2 at Selhurst Park; 0–2 at Samsun 19 Mayıs Stadium
1999	West Ham United	**Winners**	3–2	(France) Metz	0–1 at Boleyn Ground; 3–1 at Stade Saint-Symphorien
2000	Bradford City	Fourth round	0–4	(Russia) Zenit Saint Petersburg	0–1 at Petrovsky Stadium; 0–3 at Valley Parade
2000	Aston Villa	Fourth round	1–3	(Spain) **Celta Vigo**	0–1 at Balaídos; 1–2 at Villa Park
2001	Newcastle United	Final	4–4 (a)	(France) **Troyes**	0–0 at Stade de l'Aube; 4–4 at St James' Park
2001	Aston Villa	**Winners**	5–2	(Switzerland) Basel	1–1 at St. Jakob-Park; 4–1 at Villa Park
2002	Aston Villa	Fourth round	1–3	(France) Lille	1–1 at Stade Grimonprez-Jooris; 0–2 at Villa Park
2002	Fulham	**Winners**	5–3	(Italy) Bologna	2–2 at Stadio Renato Dall'Ara; 3–1 at Craven Cottage
2003	No entrants				
2004	No entrants				
2005	Newcastle United	Fourth round	2–4	(Spain) Deportivo La Coruña	1–2 at Estadio Riazor; 1–2 at St James' Park
2006	Newcastle United	**Winners**	4–1	(Norway) Lillestrøm	1–1 at St James' Park; 3–0 at Åråsen Stadion
2007	Blackburn Rovers	Won in third round	6–0	(Lithuania) Vėtra	2–0 at Vėtra Stadium; 4–0 at Ewood Park
2008	Aston Villa	Won in third round	3–2	(Denmark) Odense	2–2 at Fionia Park; 1–0 at Villa Park

=== FIFA Club World Cup ===
The FIFA Club World Cup (or the FIFA Club World Championship, as it was originally called) has been won by English clubs five times (Manchester United in 2008, Liverpool in 2019, Chelsea in 2021 and 2025, and Manchester City in 2023). Liverpool and Chelsea were also runners-up once each.

Year	Club	Progress	Score	Opponents	Venue(s)
2000	Manchester United	3rd in group stage	N/A	(Brazil) Vasco da Gama, (Mexico) Necaxa, (Australia) South Melbourne	Estádio do Maracanã, Rio de Janeiro
2005	Liverpool	Runners-up	0–1	(Brazil) **São Paulo**	International Stadium, Yokohama
2008	Manchester United	**Winners**	1–0	(Ecuador) LDU Quito	International Stadium, Yokohama
2012	Chelsea	Runners-up	0–1	(Brazil) **Corinthians**	International Stadium, Yokohama
2019	Liverpool	**Winners**	1–0 (a.e.t.)	(Brazil) Flamengo	Khalifa International Stadium, Doha
2021	Chelsea	**Winners**	2–1 (a.e.t.)	(Brazil) Palmeiras	Mohammed Bin Zayed Stadium, Abu Dhabi
2023	Manchester City	**Winners**	4–0	(Brazil) Fluminense	King Abdullah Sports City, Jeddah
2025	Manchester City	Round of 16	3–4 (a.e.t.)	(Saudi Arabia) Al-Hilal	Camping World Stadium, Orlando
2025	Chelsea	**Winners**	3–0	(France) Paris Saint-Germain	MetLife Stadium, East Rutherford

=== Intercontinental Cup ===
Before being supplanted by the FIFA Club World Cup, the now defunct Intercontinental Cup served as a de facto annual world club championship contested by the European and South American club champions. Manchester United won it in 1999, the only time an English team won. English clubs contested the cup on five other occasions (1968, 1980, 1981, 1982 and 1984), losing each time.

Additionally, English clubs have initially qualified for the Intercontinental Cup but withdrew from participation, namely Liverpool in 1977 and Nottingham Forest in 1979. Both berths were eventually taken by the respective European Cup losing finalists. Liverpool also qualified for the 1978 edition but they and opponents Boca Juniors declined to play each other, making it a no contest.

Year	Club	Progress	Score	Opponents	Venue(s)
1968	Manchester United	Runners-up	1–2	(Argentina) **Estudiantes**	0–1 at La Bombonera; 1–1 at Old Trafford
1977	Liverpool declined to take part.				
1978	Liverpool declined to take part – no match was played.				
1979	Nottingham Forest declined to take part.				
1980	Nottingham Forest	Runners-up	0–1	(Uruguay) **Nacional**	National Stadium, Tokyo
1981	Liverpool	Runners-up	0–3	(Brazil) **Flamengo**	National Stadium, Tokyo
1982	Aston Villa	Runners-up	0–2	(Uruguay) **Peñarol**	National Stadium, Tokyo
1984	Liverpool	Runners-up	0–1	(Argentina) **Independiente**	National Stadium, Tokyo
1999	Manchester United	**Winners**	1–0	(Brazil) Palmeiras	National Stadium, Tokyo

=== Olympic Games ===
Year	Club	Progress	Score	Opponents	Venue(s)
1900	Upton Park	**Winners**	N/A (Note: No final was held so it was played under a round-robin format.)	(France) Club Français, (Belgium) Université de Bruxelles	Vélodrome de Vincennes, Paris

== Performance summary by competition ==
=== European Cup/UEFA Champions League ===
Six English clubs have won either the European Cup or UEFA Champions League. Liverpool have won six times, which is the most of any English club.

Performance in the European Cup and UEFA Champions League by club
Club	Winners	Runners-up	Years won	Years runners-up
Liverpool	6	4	1977, 1978, 1981, 1984, 2005, 2019	1985, 2007, 2018, 2022
Manchester United	3	2	1968, 1999, 2008	2009, 2011
Chelsea	2	1	2012, 2021	2008
Nottingham Forest	2	0	1979, 1980	
Manchester City	1	1	2023	2021
Aston Villa	1	0	1982	
Arsenal	0	2		2006, 2026
Leeds United	0	1		1975
Tottenham Hotspur	0	1		2019

=== UEFA Cup/UEFA Europa League ===
Six English clubs have won either the UEFA Cup or UEFA Europa League. Liverpool and Tottenham Hotspur have each won three times, which is the most of any English club.

Performance in the UEFA Cup and UEFA Europa League by club
Club	Winners	Runners-up	Years won	Years runners-up
Liverpool	3	1	1973, 1976, 2001	2016
Tottenham Hotspur	3	1	1972, 1984, 2025	1974
Chelsea	2	0	2013, 2019	
Manchester United	1	2	2017	2021, 2025
Ipswich Town	1	0	1981	
Aston Villa	1	0	2026	
Arsenal	0	2		2000, 2019
Wolverhampton Wanderers	0	1		1972
Middlesbrough	0	1		2006
Fulham	0	1		2010

=== UEFA Conference League ===
Three English clubs have won either the UEFA Europa Conference League or UEFA Conference League. West Ham United, Chelsea and Crystal Palace have each won one time.

Performance in the UEFA Conference League by club
Club	Winners	Runners-up	Years won	Years runners-up
West Ham United	1	0	2023	
Chelsea	1	0	2025	
Crystal Palace	1	0	2026	

=== European/UEFA Super Cup ===
Six English clubs have won either the European Super Cup or UEFA Super Cup. Liverpool have won four times, which is the most of any English club.

Performance in the European/UEFA Super Cup by club
Club	Winners	Runners-up	Years won	Years runners-up
Liverpool	4	2	1977, 2001, 2005, 2019	1978, 1984
Chelsea	2	3	1998, 2021	2012, 2013, 2019
Manchester United	1	3	1991	1999, 2008, 2017
Nottingham Forest	1	1	1979	1980
Aston Villa	1	1	1982	2026
Manchester City	1	0	2023	
Arsenal	0	1		1994
Tottenham Hotspur	0	1		2025

=== European/UEFA Cup Winners' Cup ===
Seven English clubs have won either the European Cup Winners' Cup or UEFA Cup Winners' Cup. Chelsea have won two times, which is the most of any English club.

Performance in the European/UEFA Cup Winners' Cup by club
Club	Winners	Runners-up	Years won	Years runners-up
Chelsea	2	0	1971, 1998	
Arsenal	1	2	1994	1980, 1995
West Ham United	1	1	1965	1976
Tottenham Hotspur	1	0	1963	
Manchester City	1	0	1970	
Everton	1	0	1985	
Manchester United	1	0	1991	
Liverpool	0	1		1966
Leeds United	0	1		1973

=== Inter-Cities Fairs Cup ===
Three English clubs have won the Inter-Cities Fairs Cup. Leeds United have won two times, which is the most of any English club.

Performance in the Inter-Cities Fairs Cup by club
Club	Winners	Runners-up	Years won	Years runners-up
Leeds United	2	1	1968, 1971	1967
Newcastle United	1	0	1969	
Arsenal	1	0	1970	
Birmingham City	0	2		1960, 1961
London XI	0	1		1958

=== UEFA Intertoto Cup ===
Four English clubs have won the UEFA Intertoto Cup. Newcastle United, West Ham United, Aston Villa, and Fulham have each won one time.

Performance in the UEFA Intertoto Cup by club
Club	Winners	Runners-up	Years won	Years runners-up
Newcastle United	1	1	2006	2001
West Ham United	1	0	1999	
Aston Villa	1	0	2001	
Fulham	1	0	2002	

=== FIFA Club World Cup ===
Four English clubs have won the FIFA Club World Cup. Chelsea have won two times, which is the most of any English club.

Performance in the FIFA Club World Cup by club
Club	Winners	Runners-up	Years won	Years runners-up
Chelsea	2	1	2021, 2025	2012
Liverpool	1	1	2019	2005
Manchester United	1	0	2008	
Manchester City	1	0	2023	

=== Intercontinental Cup ===
Manchester United are the only English club that have won the Intercontinental Cup. They have won one time.

Performance in the Intercontinental Cup by club
Club	Winners	Runners-up	Years won	Years runners-up
Manchester United	1	1	1999	1968
Liverpool	0	2		1981, 1984
Nottingham Forest	0	1		1980
Aston Villa	0	1		1982

=== Olympic Games ===
Upton Park represented Great Britain at the 1900 Olympic Games and won the gold medal.

Performance in the Olympic Games by club
Club	Winners	Runners-up	Years won	Years runners-up
Upton Park	1	0	1900	

== European Cup and UEFA Champions League ==
The UEFA Champions League (previously known as the European Cup) is a seasonal club football competition organised by the Union of European Football Associations (UEFA) since 1955 for the most successful football clubs in Europe. The prize, the European Champion Clubs' Cup, is considered the most prestigious club trophy in the sport.

As of the end of the 2025–26 UEFA Champions League season, English clubs have fifteen European Cup wins. The most recent English win came in 2023 when Manchester City defeated Inter Milan 1–0 at the Atatürk Olympic Stadium. A record six English clubs have won Europe's premier club competition: Liverpool six times, the first English team to retain the cup (1977, 1978, 1981, 1984, 2005 and 2019), Manchester United three times and the first English team to win the European Cup (1968, 1999 and 2008), Nottingham Forest twice, being the second English team to retain the European Cup (1979 and 1980), Chelsea twice (2012 and 2021), Aston Villa once (1982) and Manchester City once (2023). English clubs also hold the records for the most consecutive tournament victories by clubs from one country (six wins between 1977 and 1982 by Liverpool, Forest and Villa) as well as the most consecutive defeats in the final (four teams were runners-up once each between 2006 and 2009).

=== History ===
==== Wolves' formative steps ====
Wolverhampton Wanderers were a dominant English side in the 1950s, being league champions three times (1953–54, 1957–58 and 1958–59), under the management of Stan Cullis. Wolves also finished League runners-up on five occasions, most recently in 1959–60. In 1954, before anyone had really expanded the borders of domestic football, after recently winning the first division for the first time Wolves thought they would test themselves against Hungarian giants Honved.

At the time, Honved had Ferenc Puskás, who was a star player on the world stage. The match was part of Wolves' series of 'floodlit friendlies' which turned out to be the spark that created the European Cup as it came to be known. Wolves won 3–2, playing under the rare sight of floodlights in England, and it attracted attention all over Europe. The game was also broadcast live on the BBC and would become possibly the moment that the European Cup was truly born.

Wolves had also beaten a Spartak Moscow side earlier in the series, and the Daily Mail crowned them 'champions of the world' after sinking the Hungarians. But Gabriel Hanon, editor of L'Equipe at the time, hit back, saying the English side needed to win in Budapest or Moscow before they could claim that title. Hanon was at Molineux for the match and enjoyed it so much he started a campaign to introduce a competition where Europe's elite clubs would face off against each other regularly.

==== Early years: 1955–1967 ====
As champions of The Football League in 1954–55, Chelsea were scheduled to become England's representatives in the inaugural European Champions' Cup competition, to be staged the following season. Indeed, they were drawn to face Swedish champions Djurgården in the first round. However, Chelsea were denied by the intervention of The Football League, in particular their secretary Alan Hardaker, who persuaded them to withdraw, insistent that pan-European tournaments are a mere distraction to the English domestic season.

Instead, the 1955–56 league champions, Manchester United, became the first English club to compete in the new tournament, with their manager Matt Busby determined time overcome objections from The Football League. They faced Anderlecht in the preliminary round, winning the first leg 2–0 away from home. Dennis Viollet scored the opening goal, the first for an English club in the European Cup, and he went on to become the tournament's top scorer that season, scoring nine goals. Four goals from Viollet and a hat-trick from Tommy Taylor helped United to achieve a 10–0 second leg victory as they progressed 12–0 on aggregate. United's first three home ties of the competition were played at Manchester City's Maine Road ground, since the floodlights at Old Trafford were still in the process of being installed and were not switched on until March 1957. After next eliminating Borussia Dortmund and Athletic Bilbao, United lost to holders Real Madrid in the semi-finals, 5–3 on aggregate. They did retain their league title however, to ensure their place in the following season's European Cup. They reached the semi-finals again, but after the quarter-final tie eight of their players died in the Munich air disaster, while two of the nine surviving players were injured to such an extent that they never played again.

Tottenham Hotspur reached the semi-finals of the 1961–62 tournament, but were knocked out by Benfica.

The next two seasons were less successful in terms of progress by English clubs. Ipswich Town began the 1962–63 competition with a 14–1 aggregate victory over Floriana (including a 10–0 second leg win), but lost in the first round to AC Milan, who went on to win the final at Wembley. A year later Everton were beaten by another Milan club, Inter, in the preliminary round.

==== Manchester United win at Wembley: 1967–1976 ====
Wembley Stadium was the venue for two English victories in the European Cup: Manchester United won there in 1968, as did Liverpool ten years later.

Leeds United centre forward Mick Jones was the top scorer in the 1969–70 tournament; his eight goals helped his club to reach the semi-final stage, where they lost to Celtic. Jones scored a hat-trick in Leeds' 10–0 first round first leg win over Lyn Oslo, a match in which his teammate Michael O'Grady had opened the scoring after just 35 seconds, at the time believed to be the fastest goal in European Cup history. In 1970–71, Everton reached the quarter-finals, where they lost to Panathinaikos on the away goals rule. In the early rounds, Everton had won the competition's first ever penalty shootout when they eliminated Borussia Mönchengladbach. Arsenal made their first European Cup appearance in 1971–72. They were knocked out in the quarter-finals by Ajax, who went on to win the second of three consecutive European Cups, while Arsenal would not feature in the competition for another twenty years. In 1975, Leeds United faced Bayern Munich, of Germany in the final of the tournament in Paris. The game emerged as one of the most controversial matches in football history as it transpired that match fixing played a part in the latter's 2–0 victory with both goals benefiting from dubious refereeing decisions. Leeds United supporters often sing at both home and away matches proclaiming themselves 'champions of Europe,' after feeling aggrieved by the injustice of that night.

Derby County returned to the competition in 1975–76, but this time were defeated at the second round stage by Real Madrid. A Charlie George hat-trick gave Derby a 4–1 first leg victory, but Madrid progressed thanks to a 5–1 extra time win in the second leg.

==== English domination: 1976–1984 ====
Liverpool led the way with domination in the late 1970s and until the mid 1980s. Beating any team out in front of them, they were unstoppable. Whereas the early to mid-1970s had seen three successive European Cup victories each for Ajax and Bayern Munich, the competition was dominated by English clubs in the late 1970s and early 1980s. Between 1977 and 1982, English teams won a record six successive finals. The sequence began when Liverpool, managed by Bob Paisley, beat Borussia Mönchengladbach 3–1 in the 1977 European Cup Final, in what was striker Kevin Keegan's last game for the club. Keegan's replacement Kenny Dalglish scored the only goal of the 1978 final against Club Brugge as Liverpool became the first English club to retain the trophy. Meanwhile, Brian Clough's Nottingham Forest had succeeded Liverpool as English champions, and the two teams faced each other in the first round of the 1978–79 European Cup in the first meeting of two English clubs in the competition. Nottingham Forest won the tie on the way to reaching the final, where they beat Malmö 1–0. Forest was the third club to win the tournament at their first attempt, after Real Madrid in 1955–56 and Inter Milan in 1963–64.

Liverpool was again eliminated in the first round in 1979–80, while Forest retained the trophy, beating Hamburg 1–0 in the final. The following season it was Nottingham Forest's turn to make a first round exit as Liverpool went all the way to the final, where they beat Real Madrid 1–0 to secure their third European Cup under Bob Paisley. Liverpool's Terry McDermott and Graeme Souness were the tournament's joint top scorers, alongside Bayern Munich's Karl-Heinz Rummenigge, with six goals apiece. Liverpool failed to retain the trophy on this occasion as they were beaten in the quarter-finals by CSKA Sofia in the 1981–82 competition. A sixth successive English victory was still achieved however, as Aston Villa, playing in the European Cup for the first time, beat Bayern Munich 1–0 in the final in Rotterdam. The run of victories by English clubs came to an end in 1982–83 when both Liverpool and Aston Villa went out at the quarter-final stage after losing to Widzew Łódź and Juventus respectively. In the 1983–84 competition, Liverpool once again reached the final, where they faced Roma in the latter's home stadium, the Stadio Olimpico. The match finished 1–1 after extra time and Liverpool won the subsequent penalty shootout 4–2 to lift their fourth European Cup. It was the first time that the final had been settled by spot kicks.

==== Heysel and its repercussions: 1984–1992 ====
Liverpool's participation in the 1984–85 European Cup marked their ninth successive season in the competition. They again made it to the final, but lost out 1–0 to Juventus after Michel Platini scored a second-half penalty. 1985 was the year of the Heysel Stadium disaster, which led to all English clubs being banned from European competitions for the next five seasons. The ban was lifted in 1990, but there was no English representation in the 1990–91 European Cup due to English champions Liverpool being excluded from European competitions for an additional season.

In the 1991–92 season, Arsenal were the first team to represent England in the European Cup after English teams were allowed back in. The Gunners lost out over two legs in the second round to Benfica.

==== 1990s: Champions League introduced ====
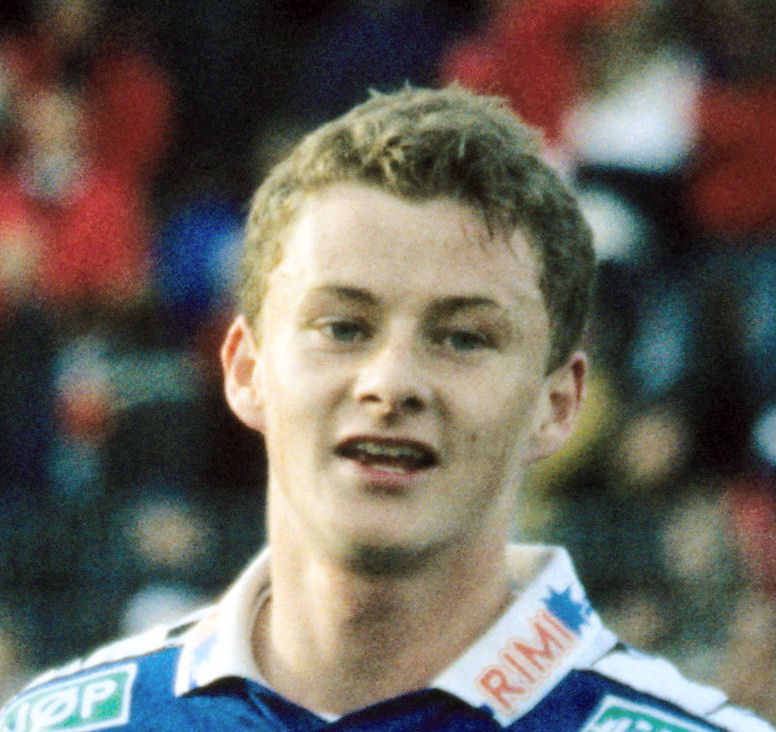
Ole Gunnar Solskjær scored the winning goal for Manchester United in the 1999 Champions League final.

The 1992–93 season saw the competition rebranded as the UEFA Champions League, a move that formalised the mini-league format that had been introduced the previous year. After winning the inaugural Premier League title, Manchester United entered the Champions League in 1993–94, the first time in a quarter of a century that they had played in European football's leading club competition. United failed to reach the group stage however, losing out on away goals to Galatasaray following a 3–3 aggregate scoreline in their second round tie.

A further change to the competition occurred in 1994–95, when the first and second rounds were replaced by four mini-leagues of four teams each, with the top two teams in each group progressing to the quarter-finals. As one of eight seeded teams, Manchester United were given a bye directly to the group stage, but missed out on the quarter-finals after finishing third, behind Barcelona on goal difference. In 1995–96, Blackburn Rovers were England's Champions League representatives, but their campaign was not a successful one as they won just one of their six group games and failed to qualify for the latter stages.

Manchester United's return to the Champions League in 1996–97 was the first of 18 consecutive seasons in which Manchester United qualified to enter the competition. They progressed through the group stages for the first time and went on to reach the semi-finals, losing to eventual winners Borussia Dortmund. United topped their mini-league in the following season's group stages, but were defeated by AS Monaco on away goals in the quarter-finals. Also representing England in 1997–98 were Newcastle United, after the runners-up from Europe's top eight leagues were allowed to enter for the first time. Newcastle successfully negotiated the second qualifying round, but could only finish third in their group, despite a victory over Barcelona in the opening group game.

==== 2000s: rise to European dominance and subsequent decline ====
Premier League teams gradually improved their performance in the Champions League until a peak centred on the 2008 season, followed by a significant decline thereafter. They had no semi-finalists for the first four seasons (1993 to 1996). They then had four semi-finalists (Manchester United in 1997, 1999, and 2002, and Leeds United in 2001) over the next seven seasons (1997 to 2003), one of whom went on to become champions (Manchester United in 1999). They then had four semi-finalists (Chelsea in 2004 and 2005, Liverpool in 2005, and Arsenal in 2006) in the next three seasons (2004 to 2006), with Arsenal going on to be runners-up in 2006 and Liverpool winning in 2005.

English teams then peaked with nine semi-finalists (Chelsea, Manchester United and Liverpool in both 2007 and 2008, and Chelsea, Manchester United and Arsenal in 2009) in the next three seasons (2007 to 2009), with Liverpool (2007), Chelsea (2008), and Manchester United (2009) going on to be runners-up, and Manchester United going on to win an all-English final against Chelsea in 2008, a year in which none of the four English teams were eliminated by anybody except another English team. Around this time, then-UEFA president Michel Platini began to make statements which resulted in a widespread perception that he was anti-English, which some attributed to his alleged fear of English domination in European club competition.

However, this dominance did not produce a corresponding number of titles. At its most dominant, from 2007 to 2009, the Premier League had 75% (9 out of 12) of the semi-finalists, 67% (4 out of 6) of the finalists, 100% (3 out of 3) of the runners-up, but only 33% (1 out of 3) of the winners (Manchester United in 2008), with the other two titles going to Milan in 2007 and Barcelona in 2009. And English dominance did not last, with the Premier League managing only two semi-finalists (Manchester United in 2011, and Chelsea in 2012) over the next four seasons (2010 to 2013), although Manchester United went on to be runners-up in 2011, and Chelsea won in 2012. In 2013, no Premier League side reached the last eight for the first time since 1996 (in a time when England were only entitled to one Champions League place compared to 2013's four), only two (Manchester United and Arsenal) made it to the last 16, and Chelsea became the first defending champions to fail to make it past the group stage of the Champions League, although by finishing third in their group they did manage to qualify for the UEFA Europa League, which they went on to win.

At that time, it was noted that if the decline continued for long enough, it could in theory eventually deprive the Premier League of its entitlement to have four teams in the Champions League each year, which it has had since 2005, but the coefficient tables gave little cause for concern from an English perspective, as all England's relevant coefficients were ahead of fourth-placed Italy's, and this did not change until 2018, when the quotas were adjusted by UEFA to guarantee four Champions League places to each of the top four nations, with those clubs going into the group stage directly rather than having to navigate qualifying rounds.

==== Late 2010s and early 2020s: renewed success ====
The following years would see two all-English finals, as well as Liverpool losing both the 2018 and 2022 finals to Real Madrid. In 2023, Manchester City won the tournament for the third English victory in five years.

===== 2018–19 =====
The downward trend was reversed in 2018–19, when all four Premier League entrants (including Liverpool, who had reached the 2018 final as a sign of impending English resurgence) progressed to the quarter-finals. Despite the general decline in the levels of success from what English clubs had enjoyed a decade earlier, and the consistent high levels for other nations, particularly Spain, England remains the only nation to have four of the last eight participants in the competition, with 2018–19 joining 2007–08 and 2008–09 in that regard (Liverpool and Manchester United were involved in all three campaigns). In addition, English sides sealed all of the final places in both UEFA competitions in the 2018–19 season. Liverpool won their sixth European Cup by defeating fellow English side Tottenham Hotspur in the 2019 Champions League final. An early penalty converted by Mohamed Salah and a late Divock Origi goal ensured a 2–0 victory for Jürgen Klopp's team. Both finalists had achieved unlikely comebacks in their semi-finals, with Liverpool overcoming a first-leg 3–0 defeat by Barcelona with a second-leg 4–0 win and Tottenham scoring the three second-half goals they required to defeat Ajax in the second leg in Amsterdam and also on away goals.

===== 2020–21 =====
The 2020–21 UEFA Champions League continued despite the COVID-19 pandemic, albeit with a condensed schedule. Porto and Chelsea were unlikely heroes when they won against Juventus and Atlético Madrid, respectively. Defending champions Bayern Munich were knocked out on away goals by previous finalists Paris Saint-Germain, after missing Robert Lewandowski with injury, in a rematch of the 2020 final. Chelsea made the semi-finals for the first time in seven years, facing Real Madrid for the first time. Manchester City defeated PSG 4–1 on aggregate en route to their first appearance in the final, while Chelsea defeated Real Madrid 3–1 on aggregate to set up the second all-English final in three years. Chelsea won the title for the second time after defeating City 1–0 at the Estádio do Dragão thanks to a goal by Kai Havertz.

===== 2021–22 and 2022–23 =====
Liverpool returned to the final in 2022, where they narrowly lost to rivals Real Madrid 1–0. In 2023, Manchester City advanced to their second final in three years, defeating the likes of Bayern Munich and Real Madrid along the way. In the final, they faced Inter Milan, winning 1–0 for City's first-ever European Cup. Furthermore, the Blues became the second-ever English men's club to achieve a rare continental treble.

== See also ==
- List of football matches between British clubs in UEFA competitions
- List of football clubs in England by competitive honours won
- History of the European Cup and UEFA Champions League
- UEFA club competition records and statistics
- List of UEFA club competition winners
