= Nottingham Forest F.C. in international football =

English club in international football

- Club: Nottingham Forest F.C.
- Seasons played: 9
- First entry: 1961–62 Inter-Cities Fairs Cup
- Latest entry: 2025–26 UEFA Europa League

Titles
- Champions League: 2: 1979; 1980
- Super Cup: 1: 1979

Nottingham Forest is an English professional football club based in Nottingham. The club's involvement in European competitions dates back to the 1960s. Their greatest success came in the late 1970s, when they won back-to-back European Cups.

== Matches ==
Matches won	Matches drawn	Matches lost	Champions	Runners-up

Season	Competition	Round	Opponent	Home	Away	Aggregate
1961–62	Inter-Cities Fairs Cup	First round	(Spain) Valencia	1–5	0–2	1–7
1967–68	Inter-Cities Fairs Cup	First round	(West Germany) Eintracht Frankfurt	4–0	1–0	5–0
1967–68	Inter-Cities Fairs Cup	Second round	(Switzerland) Zürich	2–1	0–1	2–2 (a)
1978–79	European Cup (winners)	First round	(England) Liverpool	2–0	0–0	2–0
1978–79	European Cup (winners)	Second round	(Greece) AEK Athens	5–1	2–1	7–2
1978–79	European Cup (winners)	Quarter-final	(Switzerland) Grasshopper	4–1	1–1	5–2
1978–79	European Cup (winners)	Semi-final	(West Germany) 1. FC Köln	3–3	1–0	4–3
1978–79	European Cup (winners)	Final	(Sweden) Malmö FF	1–0		
1979	European Super Cup (winners)	Final	(Spain) Barcelona	1–0	1–1	2–1
1979–80	European Cup (winners)	First round	(Sweden) Östers IF	2–0	1–1	3–1
1979–80	European Cup (winners)	Second round	(Romania) Argeş Piteşti	2–0	2–1	4–1
1979–80	European Cup (winners)	Quarter-final	(East Germany) Dynamo Berlin	0–1	3–1	3–2
1979–80	European Cup (winners)	Semi-final	(Netherlands) Ajax	2–0	0–1	2–1
1979–80	European Cup (winners)	Final	(West Germany) Hamburger SV	1–0		
1980	European Super Cup	Final	(Spain) Valencia	2–1	0–1	2–2 (a)
1980	Intercontinental Cup	Final	(Uruguay) Nacional	0–1		
1980–81	European Cup	First round	(Bulgaria) CSKA Sofia	0–1	0–1	0–2
1983–84	UEFA Cup	First round	(East Germany) Vorwärts Frankfurt	2–0	1–0	3–0
1983–84	UEFA Cup	Second round	(Netherlands) PSV Eindhoven	1–0	2–1	3–1
1983–84	UEFA Cup	Third round	(Scotland) Celtic	0–0	2–1	2–1
1983–84	UEFA Cup	Quarter-final	(Austria) Sturm Graz	1–0	1–1 (a.e.t.)	2–1
1983–84	UEFA Cup	Semi-final	(Belgium) Anderlecht	2–0	0–3 (Note: Anderlecht chairman Vanden Stock admitted to bribing the referee in charge, who awarded Anderlecht a controversial penalty and disallowed a late Forest goal.)	2–3
1984–85	UEFA Cup	First round	(Belgium) Club Brugge	0–0	0–1	0–1
1995–96	UEFA Cup	First round	(Sweden) Malmö FF	1–0	1–2	2–2 (a)
1995–96	UEFA Cup	Second round	(France) Auxerre	0–0	1–0	1–0
1995–96	UEFA Cup	Third round	(France) Lyon	1–0	0–0	1–0
1995–96	UEFA Cup	Quarter-final	(Germany) Bayern Munich	1–5	1–2	2–7
2025–26	UEFA Europa League	League phase	(Spain) Real Betis	—N/a	2–2	13th
2025–26	UEFA Europa League	League phase	(Denmark) Midtjylland	2–3	—N/a	13th
2025–26	UEFA Europa League	League phase	(Portugal) Porto	2–0	—N/a	13th
2025–26	UEFA Europa League	League phase	(Austria) Sturm Graz	—N/a	0–0	13th
2025–26	UEFA Europa League	League phase	(Sweden) Malmö FF	3–0	—N/a	13th
2025–26	UEFA Europa League	League phase	(Netherlands) Utrecht	—N/a	2–1	13th
2025–26	UEFA Europa League	League phase	(Portugal) Braga	—N/a	0–1	13th
2025–26	UEFA Europa League	League phase	(Hungary) Ferencváros	4–0	—N/a	13th
2025–26	UEFA Europa League	Knockout phase play-off	(Turkey) Fenerbahçe	1–2	3–0	4–2
2025–26	UEFA Europa League	Round of 16	(Denmark) Midtjylland	0–1	2–1 (a.e.t.)	2–2 (3–0 p)
2025–26	UEFA Europa League	Quarter-final	(Portugal) Porto	1–0	1–1	2–1
2025–26	UEFA Europa League	Semi-final	(England) Aston Villa	1–0	0–4	1–4

== Record ==
As of match played 7 May 2026

Competition	Pld	W	D	L	GF	GA
European Cup	20	12	4	4	32	14
UEFA Europa League / UEFA Cup	36	18	8	10	42	32
Inter-Cities Fairs Cup	6	3	0	3	8	9
European Super Cup	4	2	1	1	4	3
Intercontinental Cup	1	0	0	1	0	1
Total	67	35	13	19	86	59
