= 1979–80 FC Barcelona season =

81st season in existence of FC Barcelona

FC Barcelona
1979–80 season
- President: Josep Lluís Núñez
- Manager: Joaquim Rifé (until March 1980); Helenio Herrera (until May 1980); Ladislao Kubala
- La Liga: 4th
- Copa del Rey: Round of 16
- European Cup Winners' Cup: Quarter-finals
- European Super Cup: Runners-up
- Joan Gamper Trophy: Winners

The 1979–80 season was the 81st season for FC Barcelona.

== Squad ==
Note: Flags indicate national team as defined under FIFA eligibility rules; some limited exceptions apply. Players may hold more than one non-FIFA nationality.

No.	Pos.	Nation	Player
—	GK	ESP	Pello Artola
—	GK	ESP	Jaume Huguet
—	GK	ESP	Vicente Amigó
—	DF	ESP	Migueli
—	DF	ESP	Pepito Ramos
—	DF	ESP	José Joaquín Aldabalejo
—	DF	ESP	Esteban Vigo
—	DF	ESP	Antonio Olmo
—	DF	ESP	Antonio de la Cruz
—	DF	ESP	Canito
—	DF	ESP	Manolo
—	DF	ESP	Adjutorio Serrat
—	MF	ESP	Julián Rubio
—	MF	ESP	Quique Costas

No.	Pos.	Nation	Player
—	MF	ESP	Chus Landáburu
—	MF	ESP	Isidre Tarrés
—	MF	ESP	Juan José Estella
—	MF	ESP	Tente Sánchez
—	MF	ESP	Paco Martínez
—	MF	ESP	Juan Manuel Asensi
—	FW	ESP	Miquel Mir
—	FW	ARG	Zuvíria
—	FW	ESP	Lobo Carrasco
—	FW	DEN	Allan Simonsen
—	FW	ESP	Carles Rexach
—	FW	ESP	Andrés Ramírez
—	FW	ESP	Juan Carlos Heredia
—	FW	AUT	Hans Krankl
—	FW	BRA	Roberto Dinamite

=== La Liga ===
==== League table ====
Pos	Team	Pld	W	D	L	GF	GA	GD	Pts	Qualification or relegation
2	Real Sociedad	34	19	14	1	54	20	+34	52	Qualification for the UEFA Cup first round
3	Sporting Gijón	34	16	7	11	47	34	+13	39	Qualification for the UEFA Cup first round
4	Barcelona	34	13	12	9	42	33	+9	38	Qualification for the UEFA Cup first round
5	Real Betis	34	12	12	10	42	40	+2	36	
6	Valencia	34	12	12	10	50	42	+8	36	Qualification for the Cup Winners' Cup first round (Note: Valencia qualified to the Cup Winners' Cup as holders.)

Source: BDFútbol
Rules for classification: 1) Points; 2) Head-to-head results; 3) Goal difference; 4) Number of goals scored

== Results ==
GAMES
16-8-1979 Trofeo Ciudad de Palma BARCELONA-ANTWERP 2-2 /4-2/ PENALTY

18-8-1979 Trofeo Ciudad de Palma BARCELONA-VASCO DA GAMA 0-0 /2-3/ PENALTY

21-8-1979 Joan Gamper Trophy BARCELONA-ZURICH 4–0

22-8-1979 Joan Gamper Trophy BARCELONA-KOLN 3–2

25-8-1979 Ramón de Carranza Trophy BARCELONA-FLAMENGO 1–2

26-8-1979 Ramón de Carranza Trophy CADIZ-BARCELONA 1–2

30-8-1979 Friendly SEVILLA-BARCELONA 3–3

3-9-1979 Friendly DUSSELDORF-BARCELONA 2–2

9-9-1979 LA LIGA ZARAGOZA-BARCELONA 2–2

15-9-1979 LA LIGA BARCELONA-BETIS 5–0

23-9-1979 LA LIGA REAL MADRID-BARCELONA 3–2

26-9-1979 Cup Win.Cup AKRANESS-BARCELONA 0–1

30-9-1979 LA LIGA BARCELONA-SALAMANCA 0–0

3-10-1979 Cup Win.Cup BARCELONA-AKRANESS 5–0

9-10-1979 Friendly GIMNASTIC TARRAGONA-BARCELONA 1–1

14-10-1979 LA LIGA REAL SOCIEDAD-BARCELONA 4–3

20-10-1979 LA LIGA BARCELONA-HERCULES 2–0

24-10-1979 Cup Win.Cup ARIS BONNEVOIE-BARCELONA 1–4

28-10-1979 LA LIGA SPORTING-BARCELONA 4–1

3-11-1979 LA LIGA BARCELONA-BURGOS 1–0

7-11-1979 Cup Win.Cup BARCELONA-ARIS BONNEVOIE 7–1

11-11-1979 LA LIGA MALAGA-BARCELONA 0–0

18-11-1979 LA LIGA BARCELONA-SEVILLA 0–0

25-11-1979 LA LIGA ATLETICO DE MADRID-BARCELONA 2–1

2-12-1979 LA LIGA BARCELONA-LAS PALMAS 1–0

16-12-1979 LA LIGA ATHLETIC DE BILBAO-BARCELONA 2–1

19-12-1979 Friendly BARCELONA-ARGENTINOS JR. 0–0

30-12-79 LA LIGA BARCELONA-VALENCIA 2–1

6-1-1980 LA LIGA RAYO VALLECANO-BARCELONA 0–0

13-1-1980 LA LIGA ESPANYOL-BARCELONA 2–0

20-1-1980 LA LIGA BARCELONA-ALMERIA 2–0

27-1-1980 LA LIGA BARCELONA-ZARAGOZA 2–0

30-1-1980 European Super Cup NOTTINGHAM-BARCELONA 1–0

3-2-1980 LA LIGA BETIS-BARCELONA 2–1

5-2-1980 European Super Cup BARCELONA-NOTTINGHAM 1–1

10-2-1980 LA LIGA BARCELONA-REAL MADRID 0–2

17-2-1980 LA LIGA SALAMANCA-BARCELONA 1–1

23–2–1980, LA LIGA BARCELONA-REAL SOCIEDAD 0–0

26–2–1980, Copa del Rey BARCELONA-REAL SOCIEDAD 2–1

2-3-1980 LA LIGA HERCULES-BARCELONA 1–1

5-3-1980 Cup Win.Cup BARCELONA-VALENCIA 0–1

9-3-1980 LA LIGA BARCELONA-SPORTING 0–0

12-3-1980 Copa del Rey REAL SOCIEDAD-BARCELONA 3–0

16-3-1980 LA LIGA BURGOS-BARCELONA 0–0

19-3-1980 Cup Win.Cup VALENCIA-BARCELONA 4–3

23-3-1980 LA LIGA BARCELONA-MALAGA 3–0

25-3-1980 Friendly TERRASA-BARCELONA 0–0

30-3-1980 LA LIGA SEVILLA-BARCELONA 3–1

6-4-1980 LA LIGA BARCELONA-ATLETICO DE MADRID 1–0

12-4-1980 LA LIGA LAS PALMAS-BARCELONA 0–1

16-4-1980 Friendly BARCELONA-SABADELL 5–1

20-4-1980 LA LIGA BARCELONA-ATHLETIC DE BILBAO 1–0

27-4-1980 LA LIGA VALENCIA-BARCELONA 1–1

1-5-1980 Friendly REUS DEPORTIVO-BARCELONA 2–4

4-5-1980 LA LIGA BARCELONA-RAYO VALLECANO 2–1

7-5-1980 Friendly OLOT-BARCELONA 1–3

11-5-1980 LA LIGA BARCELONA-ESPANYOL 3–1

15-5-1980 Friendly SANT ANDREU-BARCELONA 1–2

18-5-1980 LA LIGA ALMERIA-BARCELONA 1–1

29-5-1980 Friendly BADALONA-BARCELONA 1–1

7-6-1980 Friendly BEVEREN-BARCELONA 2–3

10-6-1980 Friendly SELECT GALICIA-BARCELONA 3–2
