= 1980 Intercontinental Cup =

Nottingham Forest	Nacional
(England)	(Uruguay)
0	1
- Date: 11 February 1981
- Venue: National Stadium, Tokyo
- Man of the Match: Waldemar Victorino (Nacional)
- Referee: Abraham Klein (Israel)
- Attendance: 62,000

The 1980 Intercontinental Cup was an association football match played on 11 February 1981 between Nottingham Forest of England, winners of the 1979–80 European Cup, and Nacional of Uruguay, winners of the 1980 Copa Libertadores. The match was played for the first time at the neutral venue of the now demolished National Stadium in Tokyo in front of 62,000 fans. Waldemar Victorino was named as man of the match.

== Venue ==
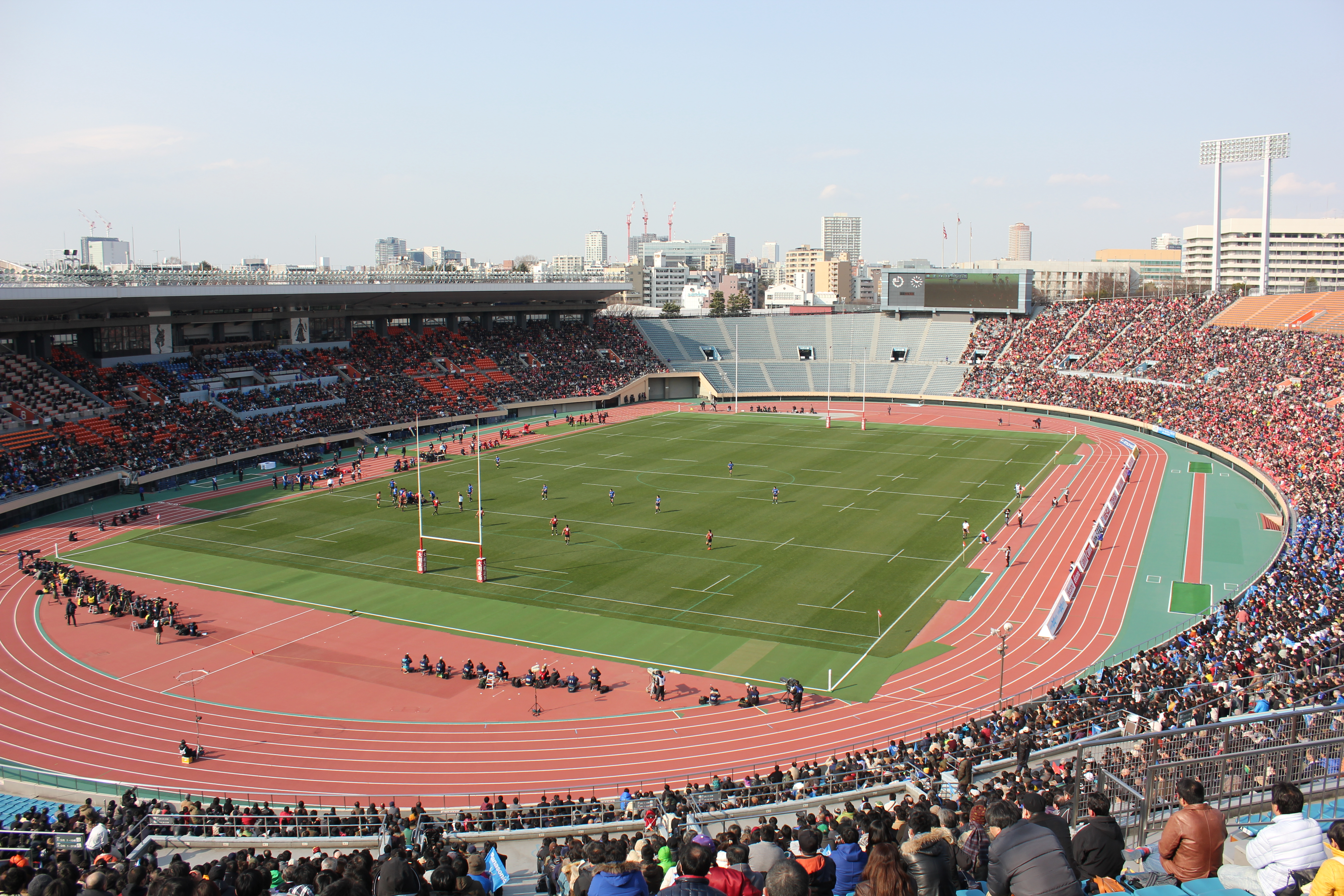
National Olympic Stadium served as venue for the first time

The National Stadium in Tokyo was the venue that hosted this first edition of the Cup, and would also be the usual venue for the rest of the editions held in Tokyo until 2002 Intercontinental Cup, when the final moved to Nissan Stadium in Yokohama. The stadium was also known as "Olympic Stadium" due to it had served as the main stadium for the opening and closing ceremonies, as well as being the venue for track and field events at the 1964 Summer Olympics,

The Japan national football team's home matches and major football club cup finals (such as J1 League) were usually held at the stadium. The National Stadium was demolished in 2014 to make way for a larger stadium that hosted matches of the 2019 Rugby World Cup and 2020 Summer Olympics.

== Match details ==
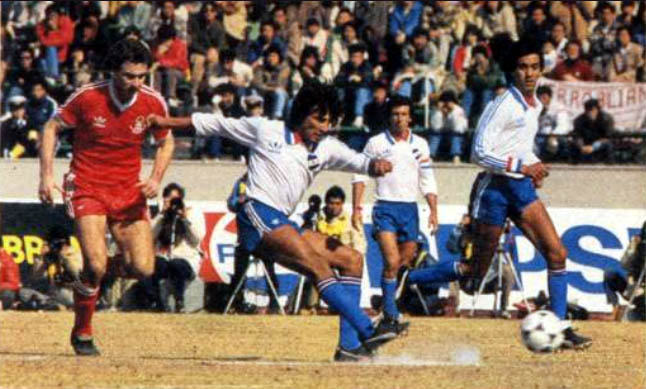
A moment of the match: Nacional striker Waldemar Victorino kicking

11 February 1981

Nottingham Forest (England)	0–1	(Uruguay) Nacional
	Report	Victorino 10'

National Stadium, Tokyo
Attendance: 62,000
Referee: Abraham Klein (Israel)

Nottingham F.	Nacional

GK	1	(England) Peter Shilton
DF	2	(England) Viv Anderson
DF	6	(Scotland) Kenny Burns (c)
DF	5	(England) Larry Lloyd
DF	3	(Scotland) Frank Gray
MF	15	(England) Stuart Gray
MF	7	(Northern Ireland) Martin O'Neill
MF	8	(Switzerland) Raimondo Ponte	(substituted off) 67'
FW	9	(England) Trevor Francis
FW	10	(Scotland) Ian Wallace
FW	11	(Scotland) John Robertson
Substitutes:
MF	4	(Scotland) John McGovern
FW	12	(England) Peter Ward	(substituted on) 67'
MF	13	(England) David Needham
Manager:
(England) Brian Clough Assistant Referees:

GK	1	(Uruguay) Rodolfo Rodríguez
DF	2	(Uruguay) José Hermes Moreira
DF	3	(Uruguay) Juan Carlos Blanco
DF	4	(Uruguay) Daniel Enríquez
DF	5	(Uruguay) Washington González
MF	16	(Uruguay) Denís Milar
MF	13	(Uruguay) Víctor Espárrago (c)
MF	10	(Uruguay) Arsenio Luzardo
FW	7	(Uruguay) Alberto Bica
FW	9	(Uruguay) Waldemar Victorino
FW	11	(Uruguay) Julio Morales
Manager:
(Uruguay) Juan Mujica

== See also ==
- 1979–80 European Cup
- 1980 Copa Libertadores
- Nottingham Forest F.C. in European football
