= Larry Lloyd =

English footballer (1948–2024)

Personal information
- Full name: Laurence Valentine Lloyd
- Date of birth: 6 October 1948
- Place of birth: Bristol, England
- Date of death: 28 March 2024 (aged 75)
- Height: 6 ft 2 in (1.88 m)
- Position: Defender

Youth career
- Henbury Old Boys

Senior career*
Years	Team	Apps	(Gls)
1967–1969	Bristol Rovers	43	(1)
1969–1974	Liverpool	150	(4)
1974–1976	Coventry City	50	(5)
1976–1981	Nottingham Forest	148	(6)
1981–1983	Wigan Athletic	52	(2)
Total		443	(18)

International career
1967	England Youth	3	(1)
1970–1972	England U23	8	(1)
1971–1980	England	4	(0)
1979	League of Ireland XI	1	(2)

Managerial career
- 1981–1983: Wigan Athletic
- 1983–1984: Notts County
- * Club domestic league appearances and goals

Laurence Valentine Lloyd (6 October 1948 – 28 March 2024) was an English professional football player and coach.

A defender, he won domestic and European honours for both Bill Shankly's Liverpool and Brian Clough's Nottingham Forest in the 1970s. He was also an England international.

== Playing career ==
=== Early years ===
Lloyd started playing local football with Henbury Old Boys before being signed by Bristol Rovers. He made his debut on 10 August 1968 at Eastville in a 1–1 draw against Watford.

=== Liverpool ===
Rovers accepted a £50,000 bid for Lloyd on 22 April 1969 with manager Bill Shankly looking for a long-term successor to ageing skipper and defender Ron Yeats. Lloyd broke into the team later that year, making his debut on 27 September in a league game at The Hawthorns. Liverpool drew 2–2 with West Bromwich Albion. By the following year Lloyd was a regular as Shankly underwent a major rebuilding of the side, finding more new players of Lloyd's age.

Lloyd partnered one of the players who survived the Shankly cull, captain Tommy Smith. The pair were at the heart of the defence that took Liverpool to the 1971 FA Cup final, losing 2–1 after extra time to newly crowned league champions Arsenal.

Sir Alf Ramsey gave Lloyd his international debut on 19 May 1971 in a British Home Championship match against Wales. The game was played at Wembley and finished 0–0. Lloyd's club teammates Chris Lawler, Emlyn Hughes and Smith all started the game.

1972 saw Lloyd score his first goal for the Reds. It came in the 3–0 league win over Manchester City at Anfield on 26 February. His goal was the first of the 3 and came in the 37th minute. Kevin Keegan (53rd) and Bobby Graham (65th) completed the scoring.

Liverpool won the League and UEFA Cup double in 1973. Lloyd did not miss a single minute of the 54 matches played in the whole season. He scored in the first leg of the UEFA Cup final helping Liverpool to a 3–2 aggregate victory over Borussia Mönchengladbach. The following year he suffered an injury losing his place to the young Phil Thompson and missed out on victory in the FA Cup final against Newcastle United.

Shankly quit that summer. successor Bob Paisley preferred Thompson and Lloyd transferred to Coventry City.

=== Coventry City ===
On 15 August 1974, Coventry under manager, Gordon Milne, paid a club record transfer fee for Lloyd. His form suffered after he was injured and he moved on to Nottingham Forest in December 1976. He had played 54 games for Coventry, scoring six goals.

=== Nottingham Forest ===
In 1976 Brian Clough, acting on Peter Taylor's advice, snapped up Lloyd for £60,000 after an initial loan period. Forest were chasing promotion to the top flight in English football. He made his Forest debut on 2 October in a league match against Hull City. Forest lost 1–0 away at Boothferry Park. It did not prevent Lloyd going on to win promotion with Forest that season. They won the League title the next season, and also won the League Cup final, against Lloyd's former club, Liverpool.

In 1979, Lloyd and Forest won the European Cup and retained the League Cup.

In the 1979–80 League Cup they reached the final for the third season running but lost to Wolverhampton Wanderers.

In June 1979, Lloyd represented the League of Ireland XI as a guest player in a tour of Asia, scoring twice in a 4–1 win over Singapore.

In 1980, Forest retained their European crown.

== International career ==
Lloyd made four appearances for England in an international career which spanned over eight years. He made his debut on 19 May 1971 under the managership of Alf Ramsey in a Home Championship game against Wales which ended in a 0–0 draw. He made two further appearances, against Switzerland and Northern Ireland in 1971 and 1972 but was not picked again until 17 May 1980. Now under the managership of Ron Greenwood, Lloyd was picked to play against Wales again in the Home Championship. This was his last international appearance as England lost 4–1 to Wales at the Racecourse Ground in Wrexham.

== Coaching career ==
=== Wigan Athletic ===
Lloyd left Forest for Wigan Athletic in March 1981, where he was player-manager taking over from Ian McNeill. In 1981–82, he guided them to promotion from the Fourth Division, in only their fourth season as a Football League team. The following season, Lloyd oversaw their survival in the Third Division.

=== Notts County ===
Lloyd's success as Wigan attracted the attention of Notts County, who were looking for a new first team manager after Jimmy Sirrel "moved upstairs". However, after Lloyd's only season at Meadow Lane he left the club after relegation ended their three-year stay in the First Division, being sacked on 21 October 1984.

== Personal life ==
Up until 2000 Lloyd was a regular and outspoken pundit for Nottingham-based local radio, firstly on GEM AM and latterly on Century 106, covering Forest matches. He lived in Spain for many years, where he had a number of bars and dealt in property sales. He was involved in football as manager of amateur side Real Marbella.

In 2001 after falling on hard times, Lloyd took the decision to sell his European competition medals raising £12,000 from a sale at Christie's. He regretted selling the medals which he claimed was forced on him by his financial position.

In 2008 Lloyd's autobiography titled "Hard Man, Hard Game" was published.

In 2021, he returned to the UK to live in Nottinghamshire. Lloyd died on 28 March 2024, at the age of 75.

== Career statistics ==
Appearances and goals by club, season and competition
Club	Season	League			FA Cup		League Cup		Europe		Other (Note: Includes FA Charity Shield, Anglo-Scottish Cup, European Super Cup and Intercontinental Cup.)		Total	
Club	Season	Division	Apps	Goals	Apps	Goals	Apps	Goals	Apps	Goals	Apps	Goals	Apps	Goals
Bristol Rovers	1968–69	Third Division	43	1	7	0	1	0	—		—		51	1
Liverpool	1969–70	First Division	8	0	0	0	0	0	1	0	—		9	0
Liverpool	1970–71	First Division	40	0	7	0	3	0	10	0	—		60	0
Liverpool	1971–72	First Division	33	1	2	0	3	0	4	0	1	0	43	1
Liverpool	1972–73	First Division	42	2	4	0	8	0	12	1	—		66	3
Liverpool	1973–74	First Division	27	1	3	0	6	0	4	0	0	0	40	1
Liverpool	Total		150	4	16	0	20	0	31	1	1	0	218	5
Coventry City	1974–75	First Division	34	5	3	1	1	0	—		—		38	6
Coventry City	1975–76	First Division	11	0	0	0	0	0	—		—		11	0
Coventry City	1976–77	First Division	5	0	0	0	0	0	—		—		5	0
Coventry City	Total		50	5	3	1	1	0	—		—		54	6
Nottingham Forest	1976–77	Second Division	26	3	5	0	0	0	—		3	0	34	3
Nottingham Forest	1977–78	First Division	26	0	2	0	6	1	—		—		34	1
Nottingham Forest	1978–79	First Division	36	0	3	1	6	1	9	1	1	1	55	4
Nottingham Forest	1979–80	First Division	42	3	2	0	9	1	9	0	2	0	64	4
Nottingham Forest	1980–81	First Division	18	0	2	0	2	0	2	0	3	0	27	0
Nottingham Forest	Total		148	6	14	1	23	3	20	1	9	1	214	12
Wigan Athletic	1980–81	Fourth Division	9	0	0	0	0	0	—		—		9	0
Wigan Athletic	1981–82	Fourth Division	36	2	0	0	4	2	—		—		40	4
Wigan Athletic	1982–83	Third Division	7	0	0	0	1	0	—		—		8	0
Wigan Athletic	Total		52	2	0	0	5	2	—		—		57	4
Career total			443	18	40	2	50	5	51	2	10	1	599	28

== Managerial statistics ==
Team	From	To	Record				
Team	From	To	P	W	D	L	Win %
Wigan Athletic	3 March 1981	4 April 1983	107	47	27	33	43.9
Notts County	7 July 1983	21 October 1984	66	19	15	32	28.8
Total			173	66	42	65	38.2

== Honours ==
Liverpool

- Football League First Division: 1972–73
- UEFA Cup: 1972–73
- FA Cup runner-up: 1970–71

Nottingham Forest

- Football League First Division: 1977–78
- Football League Cup: 1977–78, 1978–79
- FA Charity Shield: 1978
- European Cup: 1978–79, 1979–80
- European Super Cup: 1979
- Anglo-Scottish Cup: 1976–77
