= 1979 European Super Cup =

Nottingham Forest	Barcelona
(England)	(Spain)
2	1
- on aggregate

First leg
Nottingham Forest	Barcelona
1	0
- Date: 30 January 1980
- Venue: City Ground, Nottingham
- Referee: Adolf Prokop (East Germany)
- Attendance: 23,807

Second leg
Barcelona	Nottingham Forest
1	1
- Date: 5 February 1980
- Venue: Camp Nou, Barcelona
- Referee: Walter Eschweiler (West Germany)
- Attendance: 80,000

The 1979 European Super Cup was played between 1978–79 European Cup winners Nottingham Forest and 1978–79 European Cup Winners' Cup winners Barcelona, with Nottingham Forest winning 2–1 on aggregate.

== Match details ==
=== First leg ===
30 January 1980

Nottingham Forest (England)	1–0	(Spain) Barcelona
George 9'	Report

City Ground, Nottingham
Attendance: 23,807
Referee: Adolf Prokop (East Germany)

Nottingham Forest	Barcelona

GK	(England) Peter Shilton
DF	(England) Viv Anderson
DF	(Scotland) Frank Gray
MF	(Northern Ireland) Martin O'Neill
DF	(England) Larry Lloyd
DF	(Scotland) Kenny Burns
FW	(England) Trevor Francis
MF	(England) Ian Bowyer
FW	(England) Garry Birtles
FW	(England) Charlie George
MF	(Scotland) John Robertson
Manager:
(England) Brian Clough

GK	(Spain) Pedro Artola
DF	(Argentina) Rafael Zuviría
DF	(Spain) Migueli
DF	(Spain) Antonio Olmo
DF	(Spain) Adjutorio Serrat
MF	(Spain) Quique Costas
MF	(Spain) Juan Manuel Asensi
MF	(Spain) Jesús Landáburu
MF	(Spain) Julián Rubio
FW	(Denmark) Allan Simonsen	(substituted off) 88'
FW	(Brazil) Roberto Dinamite	(substituted off) 86'
Substitutions:
FW	(Spain) Lobo Carrasco	(substituted on) 86'
FW	(Spain) Esteban Vigo	(substituted on) 88'
Manager:
(Spain) Joaquim Rifé

=== Second leg ===
5 February 1980

Barcelona (Spain)	1–1	(England) Nottingham Forest
Roberto 25' (pen.)	Report	Burns 42'

Camp Nou, Barcelona
Attendance: 80,000
Referee: Walter Eschweiler (West Germany)

Barcelona	Nottingham Forest

GK	(Spain) Pedro Artola
DF	(Spain) Juan José Estella
DF	(Spain) Migueli
DF	(Spain) Antonio Olmo
DF	(Spain) Adjutorio Serrat	Substituted off
MF	(Spain) Tente Sánchez
MF	(Spain) Juan Manuel Asensi
MF	(Spain) Julián Rubio
MF	(Denmark) Allan Simonsen
FW	(Brazil) Roberto Dinamite
FW	(Spain) Lobo Carrasco
Substitutions:
FW	(Spain) Esteban Vigo	Substituted on
Manager:
(Spain) Joaquim Rifé

GK	(England) Peter Shilton
DF	(England) Viv Anderson
DF	(Scotland) Frank Gray
MF	(Scotland) John McGovern
DF	(England) Larry Lloyd
DF	(Scotland) Kenny Burns
MF	(England) Stan Bowles
MF	(England) Trevor Francis	Substituted off
FW	(England) Garry Birtles
FW	(England) Charlie George
MF	(Scotland) John Robertson
Substitutions:
MF	(Northern Ireland) Martin O'Neill	Substituted on
MF	(England) Ian Bowyer
DF	(England) David Needham
MF	(Scotland) John O'Hare
Manager:
(England) Brian Clough

== See also ==
- 1979 European Cup final
- 1979 European Cup Winners' Cup final
- 1979–80 European Cup
- 1979–80 European Cup Winners' Cup
- 1979–80 FC Barcelona season
- 1982–83 Nottingham Forest F.C. season
- FC Barcelona in international football
- Nottingham Forest F.C. in European football
