= 1970–71 Aston Villa F.C. season =

English football club season

Aston Villa
1970–71 season
- Chairman: Doug Ellis
- Manager: Vic Crowe
- Stadium: Villa Park
- Third Division: 4th
- FA Cup: first round
- League Cup: runners up

The 1970–71 English football season was Aston Villa's 72nd season in the Football League. Under manager Vic Crowe, Villa's 4th place finish in the Third Division remains their lowest League position in history. In contrast Villa's run in the League Cup would end at Wembley.

There were debut appearances for Geoff Vowden (97), Harry Gregory (24), Dave Gibson (19), and Geoff Crudgington (4).

== League Cup ==
Date	Opponent	Venue	Result	Notes	Scorers
19 Aug 1970	Notts County	Villa Park	4–0 W	1st Round	Willie Anderson 20'; Pat McMahon 26'; Bruce Rioch 36'; Chico Hamilton 62'
9 Sep 1970	Burnley	Villa Park	2–0 W	2nd Round	Chico Hamilton 65'; Lionel Martin 78'
6 Oct 1970	Northampton	County Ground	1–1 D	3rd Round	Chico Hamilton 23'
13 Oct 1970	Northampton	Villa Park	3–0 W	3rd Round replay	Andy Lochhead 39', 65'; Willie Anderson 55'
28 Oct 1970	Carlisle	Villa Park	1–0 W	4th Round	Brian Tiler 67'
17 Nov 1970	Bristol Rovers	Eastville	1–1 D	Quarter-final	Pat McMahon 1'
25 Nov 1970	Bristol Rovers	Villa Park	1–0 W	Quarter-final replay	Pat McMahon 88'
16 Dec 1970	Manchester United	Old Trafford	1–1 D	Semi-final	Andy Lochhead 40'
23 Dec 1970	Manchester United	Villa Park	2–1 W	Semi-final replay	Andy Lochhead 37'; Pat McMahon 72'
27 Feb 1971	Spurs	Wembley	0–2 L	Final	—

== Third Division ==
Pos	Team	Pld	W	D	L	GF	GA	GAv	Pts	Qualification or relegation
2	Fulham (P)	46	24	12	10	68	41	1.659	60	Promotion to the Second Division
3	Halifax Town	46	22	12	12	74	55	1.345	56	Qualification for the Watney Cup
4	Aston Villa	46	19	15	12	54	46	1.174	53	
5	Chesterfield	46	17	17	12	66	38	1.737	51	
6	Bristol Rovers	46	19	13	14	69	50	1.380	51	

Rules for classification: 1) Points; 2) Goal average; 3) Goals scored
(P) Promoted

=== Matches ===
15 August 1970	Chesterfield	2–3	Aston Villa	Saltergate
		Report	Pat McMahon; Bruce Rioch; Bruce Rioch

22 August 1970	Aston Villa	1–1	Plymouth	Villa Park
	Pat McMahon	Report

29 August 1970	Swansea City	1–2	Aston Villa	Vetch Field
		Report	Chico Hamilton; Pat McMahon

31 August 1970	Aston Villa	0–1	Mansfield Town	Villa Park
		Report

5 September 1970	Aston Villa	3–2	Doncaster Rovers	Villa Park
	Andy Lochhead; Andy Lochhead; Pat McMahon	Report

12 September 1970	Barnsley	1–1	Aston Villa	Oakwell
		Report	Dave Simmons

19 September 1970	Aston Villa	2–0	Preston North End	Villa Park
	Andy Lochhead; Andy Lochhead	Report

23 September 1970	Aston Villa	2–1	Gillingham	Villa Park
	Chico Hamilton; Pat McMahon	Report

26 September 1970	Wrexham	2–3	Aston Villa	Racecourse Ground
		Report	Andy Lochhead; Dave Gibson; Chico Hamilton

30 September 1970	Aston Villa	1–1	Bristol Rovers	Villa Park
	Andy Lochhead	Report

3 October 1970	Aston Villa	0–0	Brighton	Villa Park
		Report

10 October 1970	Rochdale	1–1	Aston Villa	Spotland
		Report	Andy Lochhead

17 October 1970	Aston Villa	0–0	Chesterfield	Villa Park
		Report

19 October 1970	Port Vale	2–0	Aston Villa	Vale Park
		Report

24 October 1970	Aston Villa	1–0	Tranmere Rovers	Villa Park
	Chico Hamilton	Report

31 October 1970	Reading	3–5	Aston Villa	Elm Park
		Report	Andy Lochhead; Brian Tiler; Pat McMahon; Willie Anderson; (Own Goal)

7 November 1970	Aston Villa	0–1	Torquay United	Villa Park
		Report
Note: Villa played Torquay for the first time in their 96 year history. Coincidentally the teams met again later that same month having been drawn in the FA Cup.

11 November 1970	Aston Villa	1–0	Bury	Villa Park
	Chico Hamilton	Report

14 November 1970	Halifax Town	2–1	Aston Villa	The Shay
		Report	Fred Turnbull

28 November 1970	Fulham	0–2	Aston Villa	Craven Cottage
		Report	Chico Hamilton; Pat McMahon

5 December 1970	Aston Villa	1–0	Bradford City	Villa Park
	Chico Hamilton	Report

19 December 1970	Plymouth	1–1	Aston Villa	Home Park
		Report	Andy Lochhead

26 December 1970	Aston Villa	2–0	Shrewsbury Town	Villa Park
	Pat McMahon; Bruce Rioch	Report

2 January 1971	Walsall	3–0	Aston Villa	Fellows Park
		Report

9 January 1971	Bristol Rovers	1–2	Aston Villa	Eastville Stadium
		Report	Bruce Rioch; (Own Goal)

16 January 1971	Aston Villa	1–0	Port Vale	Villa Park
	Bruce Rioch	Report

23 January 1971	Rotherham United	1–1	Aston Villa	Millmoor
		Report	Chico Hamilton

30 January 1971	Aston Villa	1–0	Fulham	Villa Park
	Willie Anderson	Report

6 February 1971	Bradford City	1–0	Aston Villa	Valley Parade
		Report

13 February 1971	Aston Villa	1–0	Rotherham United	Villa Park
	Willie Anderson	Report

20 February 1971	Bury	3–1	Aston Villa	Gigg Lane
		Report	(Own Goal)

5 March 1971	Tranmere Rovers	1–1	Aston Villa	Prenton Park
		Report	Chico Hamilton

10 March 1971	Gillingham	0–0	Aston Villa	Priestfield
		Report

13 March 1971	Aston Villa	1–1	Halifax Town	Villa Park
	Fred Turnbull	Report

17 March 1971	Aston Villa	0–0	Walsall	Villa Park
		Report

20 March 1971	Torquay United	1–1	Aston Villa	Plainmoor
		Report	Geoff Vowden

26 March 1971	Doncaster Rovers	2–1	Aston Villa	Belle Vue
		Report	Harry Gregory

3 April 1971	Aston Villa	3–0	Swansea City	Villa Park
	Geoff Vowden; Geoff Vowden; Harry Gregory	Report

9 April 1971	Brighton	1–0	Aston Villa	Goldstone Ground
		Report

10 April 1971	Shrewsbury Town	2–1	Aston Villa	Gay Meadow
		Report	Fred Turnbull

12 April 1971	Aston Villa	0–0	Barnsley	Villa Park
		Report

17 April 1971	Aston Villa	1–0	Rochdale	Villa Park
	Geoff Vowden	Report

24 April 1971	Preston North End	0–0	Aston Villa	Deepdale
		Report

26 April 1971	Mansfield Town	2–0	Aston Villa	Field Mill
		Report

1 May 1971	Aston Villa	3–4	Wrexham	Villa Park
	Geoff Vowden; Brian Godfrey; Brian Godfrey	Report

4 May 1971	Aston Villa	2–1	Reading	Villa Park
	Willie Anderson; (Own Goal)	Report

Source: avfchistory.co.uk

== FA Cup ==
At the First round proper stage the 48 clubs from the Football League Third and Fourth Divisions joined the non-league clubs who came through the qualifying rounds. To complete this round, four additional non-league clubs were given byes. Macclesfield Town and Telford United were the finalists from the inaugural FA Trophy competition held during the previous season, while Enfield and Dagenham were the finalists from the previous season's FA Amateur Cup.

Matches were scheduled to be played on Saturday, 21 November 1970, with the exception of the Great Harwood–Rotherham United match which was played the following Tuesday.

Tie no	Home team	Score	Away team	Date
30	Torquay United	3–1	Aston Villa	21 November 1970

== Players ==
- 1 John Dunn
- 2 Keith Bradley
- 3 Charlie Aitken
- 4 Brian Godfrey (c)
- 5 Fred Turnbull
- 6 Brian Tiler
- 7 Pat McMahon
- 8 Bruce Rioch
- 9 Andy Lochhead
- 10 Ian Hamilton
- 11 Willie Anderson
- 12 Dave Gibson
