= 1969–70 Aston Villa F.C. season =

English football club season

Aston Villa
1969–70 season
- Chairman: Doug Ellis
- Manager: Tommy Docherty; Vic Crowe
- Stadium: Villa Park
- Second Division: 21st
- FA Cup: Third round
- League Cup: Second round

Second City Derby
- 32--23--24

The 1969–70 English football season was Aston Villa's 71st season in the Football League, this season playing in the Football League Second Division. The era was one of conspicuous underachievement. On 19 January 1970, with Villa bottom of the Second Division, manager Tommy Docherty was sacked. Vic Crowe was subsequently appointed manager.

== Second Division ==
Pos	Team	Pld	W	D	L	GF	GA	GAv	Pts	Qualification or relegation
18	Birmingham City	42	11	11	20	51	78	0.654	33	
19	Watford	42	9	13	20	44	57	0.772	31	
20	Charlton Athletic	42	7	17	18	35	76	0.461	31	
21	Aston Villa (R)	42	8	13	21	36	62	0.581	29	Relegation to the Third Division
22	Preston North End (R)	42	8	12	22	43	63	0.683	28	Relegation to the Third Division

Rules for classification: 1) Points; 2) Goal average; 3) Goals scored
(R) Relegated

=== Matches ===
9 August 1969 1	Aston Villa	0–1	Norwich City	Villa Park
		Report

16 August 1969 2	Huddersfield Town	2–0	Aston Villa	Leeds Road
		Report
Note:

19 August 1969 3	Carlisle United	1–1	Aston Villa	Brunton Park
		Report	Chico Hamilton, 51
Note:

23 August 1969 4	Aston Villa	0–2	Swindon Town	Villa Park
		Report
Note:

27 August 1969 5	Aston Villa	0–1	Leicester City	Villa Park
		Report
Note:

30 August 1969 6	Middlesbrough	1–0	Aston Villa	Ayresome Park
		Report

6 September 1969 7	Aston Villa	2–2	Millwall	Villa Park
	Dave Rudge 64, 66	Report

13 September 1969 8	Watford	3–0	Aston Villa	Vicarage Road
		Report

17 September 1969 9	Bolton Wanderers	2–1	Aston Villa	Burnden Park
		Report	(Bruce Rioch), 63'
Note: Jimmy Brown, playing at left-back, became Aston Villa's youngest ever player to play in a first team league game at 15 years 349 days, a record which still stands to this day.

20 September 1969 10	Aston Villa	3–2	Hull City	Villa Park
	(Brian Godfrey), 30'; (Lew Chatterley), 70'; (Dave Rudge), 77'	Report

27 September 1969 11	Portsmouth	0–0	Aston Villa	Fratton Park
		Report

4 October 1969 12	Aston Villa	0–0	Preston North End	Villa Park
		Report

8 October 1969 13	Aston Villa	4–1	Huddersfield Town	Villa Park
	(Brian Godfrey), 11'; (Brian Tiler), 34'; (Barrie Hole), 56'; (Lionel Martin), 80'	Report

11 October 1969 14	Cardiff City	4–0	Aston Villa	Ninian Park
		Report

18 October 1969 15	Aston Villa	0–0	Birmingham City	Villa Park
		Report
Note: In the Second City derby Villa drew at home and won away.

25 October 1969 16	Oxford United	2–2	Aston Villa	Manor Ground
		Report	Pat McMahon 11, 42

1 November 1969 17	Aston Villa	1–1	Queens Park Rangers	Villa Park
	(Dave Simmons), 78'	Report

8 November 1969 18	Bristol City	1–0	Aston Villa
		Report

12 November 1969 19	Aston Villa	1–0	Carlisle United	Villa Park
	(Dave Rudge), 79'	Report
Note: Before the game, a Villa player pushed open the visitor's dressing room door and threw in a broom. A reference towards the war of words between the team managers the previous season.

15 November 1969 20	Aston Villa	0–0	Blackpool	Villa Park
		Report

19 November 1969 21	Aston Villa	3–0	Bolton Wanderers	Villa Park
	(Lionel Martin), 18'; (Bruce Rioch), 67'; (Willie Anderson), 70'	Report

22 November 1969 22	Sheffield United	5–0	Aston Villa
		Report

6 December 1969 23	Blackburn Rovers	2–0	Aston Villa
		Report

13 December 1969 24	Aston Villa	0–2	Watford	Villa Park
		Report

26 December 1969 25	Swindon Town	1–1	Aston Villa
		Report	Goal
Note: Despite suffering flu earlier in the week, George Curtis scored in his debut match for Villa. Curtis headed in from Willie Anderson's corner kick three minutes after the interval to equalise. Villa remain bottom with 17 games to play; that only six points separate the bottom eleven provides some hope.

17 January 1970 26	Aston Villa	3–5	Portsmouth	Villa Park
	(Bruce Rioch), 18'; (Willie Anderson), 36'; (Bruce Rioch), 84'	Report
Note: On 19 January 1970, with Villa bottom of the Second Division, manager Tommy Docherty was sacked.

31 January 1970 27	Preston North End	1–1	Aston Villa
		Report	(Lew Chatterley), 40'

7 February 1970 28	Aston Villa	1–1	Cardiff City	Villa Park
	(Bruce Rioch), 87'	Report

14 February 1970 29	Norwich City	3–1	Aston Villa
		Report	(Willie Anderson), 42'

21 February 1970 30	Aston Villa	0–2	Bristol City	Villa Park
		Report
Note: Twenty-eight-year-old Andy Lochhead made his debut.

25 February 1970 31	Aston Villa	1–0	Charlton Athletic	Villa Park
	(Own Goal), 37'	Report

28 February 1970 32	Queens Park Rangers	4–2	Aston Villa
		Report	(Willie Anderson), 14' (pen.); (Lew Chatterley), 79'

10 March 1970 33	Hull City	3–1	Aston Villa
		Report	George Curtis, 50

14 March 1970 34	Charlton Athletic	1–0	Aston Villa
		Report

16 March 1970 35	Millwall	2–0	Aston Villa
		Report

21 March 1970 36	Aston Villa	1–1	Blackburn Rovers	Villa Park
	George Curtis, 9	Report

28 March 1970 37	Blackpool	2–1	Aston Villa
		Report	(Chico Hamilton), 65'

30 March 1970 38	Birmingham City	0–2	Aston Villa
		Report	(Bruce Rioch), 14'; (Pat McMahon), 81'
Note: In the Second City derby Villa drew at home and won away.

31 March 1970 39	Aston Villa	0–0	Oxford United	Villa Park
		Report

4 April 1970 40	Leicester City	1–0	Aston Villa
		Report

8 April 1970 41	Aston Villa	2–0	Middlesbrough	Villa Park
	(Willie Anderson), 24'; (Brian Godfrey), 64'	Report

13 April 1970 42	Aston Villa	1–0	Sheffield United	Villa Park
	(Pat McMahon), 69'	Report

Source: avfchistory.co.uk

== FA Cup ==
=== Third round ===
The 44 First and Second Division clubs entered the competition at this stage. The matches were scheduled Saturday, 3 January 1970, but three were played at later dates. Nine matches were drawn and went to replays, with York City and Cardiff City requiring a second replay at Birmingham City's St Andrew's ground.

Tie no	Home team	Score	Away team	Date
9	Aston Villa	1–1	Charlton Athletic	3 January 1970
Replay	Charlton Athletic	1–0	Aston Villa	12 January 1970

== League Cup ==
=== First round ===
Date	Home team	Score	Away team	Home Scorers	Away Scorers	Attendance
13 August 1969	Chester	1–2	Aston Villa	Dearden	McMahon, Hamilton	10,510

=== Second round ===
Home team	Score	Away team	Date
Aston Villa	1–2	West Bromwich Albion	3 September 1969

== Players ==
Bruce Rioch (154) moved to Aston Villa in July 1969 for a fee of £100,000, then a record fee paid by a Second Division side. Tommy Docherty, then Manager saw two Zambians, Emment Kapengwe (3) and Freddie Mwila (1) in action and signed them on. They arrived in Birmingham in August 1969 and signed for Villa for two years. There, they met Brian Tiler (107) who would later coach the Zambian national team. Kapengwe and Mwila became the second and third black players to represent Villa since Willie Clarke in 1901. Other debut appearances included Chico Hamilton (208), Andy Lochhead (131), Pat McMahon (130), Jimmy Brown (75), George Curtis (51), Neil Rioch (22), John Phillips (15), Evan Williams (12), and Brian Rowan (1).

Results were not very good and Villa were relegated to the third division. Docherty left the team and the Zambian duo decided to return home after nine months with Villa.
