= 1971 Football League Cup final =

- Event: 1970–71 Football League Cup
Tottenham Hotspur	Aston Villa
2	0
- Date: 27 February 1971
- Venue: Wembley Stadium, London
- Referee: Jim Finney (Hereford)
- Attendance: 100,000

The 1971 Football League Cup final took place on 27 February 1971 at Wembley Stadium. It was the eleventh Football League Cup final and the fifth to be played at Wembley.

It was contested between Tottenham Hotspur and Aston Villa. Tottenham Hotspur were riding high in the First Division (as the top level of league football in England was then known) and Aston Villa, the most successful club of the late Victorian and Edwardian eras and a traditional heavyweight, were in the Third Division (then the third tier of English football), a level to which it had never previously sunk.

This match signalled the reversal of a long period of decline for Villa. Ten years later they were champions of England and the following year they had become the champions of Europe.

== Players and officials ==
27 February 1971
15:30

Tottenham Hotspur	2–0	Aston Villa
Chivers 78', 82'

Wembley Stadium, London
Attendance: 100,000
Referee: J. Finney

Tottenham Hotspur	Aston Villa

1	(Northern Ireland) Pat Jennings
2	(Republic of Ireland) Joe Kinnear
3	(England) Cyril Knowles
4	(England) Alan Mullery (c)
5	(England) Peter Collins
6	(England) Phil Beal
7	(Scotland) Alan Gilzean
8	(England) Steve Perryman
9	(England) Martin Chivers
10	(England) Martin Peters
11	(England) Jimmy Neighbour
Substitute:
12	(England) Jimmy Pearce
Manager:
(England) Bill Nicholson

1	(England) John Dunn
2	(England) Keith Bradley
3	(Scotland) Charlie Aitken
4	(Wales) Brian Godfrey (c)
5	(England) Fred Turnbull
6	(England) Brian Tiler
7	(Scotland) Pat McMahon
8	(Scotland) Bruce Rioch
9	(Scotland) Andy Lochhead
10	(England) Ian Hamilton
11	(England) Willie Anderson
Substitute:
12	(Scotland) Dave Gibson
Manager:
(Wales) Vic Crowe

== Road to Wembley ==
Home teams listed first.

=== Tottenham Hotspur ===
Round 1: Bye

Round 2: Tottenham Hotspur 3-0 Swansea City (9 September 1970)

Round 3: Tottenham Hotspur 2-1 Sheffield United (7 October 1970)

Round 4: Tottenham Hotspur 5-0 West Bromwich Albion (28 October 1970)

Quarter final: Tottenham Hotspur 4-1 Coventry City (18 November 1970)

Semi final, 1st leg: Bristol City 1–1 Tottenham Hotspur (16 December 1970)

Semi final, 2nd leg: Tottenham Hotspur 2–0 Bristol City (after extra time) (23 December 1970)

Tottenham won 3–1 on aggregate

=== Aston Villa ===
Round 1: Aston Villa 4–0 Notts County

Round 2: Aston Villa 2–0 Burnley

Round 3: Northampton Town 1–1 Aston Villa

Replay Aston Villa 3–0 Northampton Town

Round 4: Aston Villa 1–0 Carlisle United

Quarter final: Bristol Rovers 1–1 Aston Villa

Replay Aston Villa 1–0 Bristol Rovers

Semi final, 1st leg: Manchester United 1–1 Aston Villa

Semi final, 2nd leg: Aston Villa 2–1 Manchester United

Aston Villa won 3–2 on aggregate
