= 1971–72 Aston Villa F.C. season =

English football club season

Aston Villa
1971–72 season
- Chairman: Doug Ellis
- Manager: Vic Crowe
- Stadium: Villa Park
- Third Division: 1st
- FA Cup: First round
- League Cup: Fourth round

The 1971–72 English football season was Aston Villa's 73rd season in the Football League, this season playing in the Football League Third Division. Under manager Vic Crowe Aston Villa won promotion to the Second Division as champions with a record 70 points, and thus ended their two-year spell in the Third Division. By the end of the decade they were firmly re-established as a First Division club.

In July 1971, Ray Graydon secured a £50,000 move from third division Bristol Rovers, with captain Brian Godfrey moving in the opposite direction. Graydon missed just one of Villa's 46 league games in the 1971–72 season, scoring 14 goals as the club secured the Third Division title with a five-point margin over Brighton & Hove Albion. Debut Appearances included Brian Little (247), Chris Nicholl (210), Ian Ross (175), Jimmy Cumbes (157), Tommy Hughes (16), and Malcolm Beard (6). Willie Anderson's contribution included scoring a career high fifteen goals in all competitions with eight coming from penalties, helping him gain a reputation as a penalty taker specialist.

== Third Division ==
Pos	Team	Pld	W	D	L	GF	GA	GAv	Pts	Qualification or relegation
1	Aston Villa (C, P)	46	32	6	8	85	32	2.656	70	Promotion to the Second Division
2	Brighton & Hove Albion (P)	46	27	11	8	82	47	1.745	65	Promotion to the Second Division
3	Bournemouth	46	23	16	7	73	37	1.973	62	
4	Notts County	46	25	12	9	74	44	1.682	62	Qualification for the Watney Cup
5	Rotherham United	46	20	15	11	69	52	1.327	55	

Rules for classification: 1) Points; 2) Goal average; 3) Goals scored
(C) Champions; (P) Promoted

=== Matches ===
14 August 1971	Aston Villa	3–1	Plymouth Argyle	Villa Park
	Geoff Vowden; Pat McMahon; Willie Anderson, pen	Report
Note: Ray Graydon and goal-keeper Tommy Hughes made their debuts.

21 August 1971	Walsall	1–1	Aston Villa
	Geoff Vowden	Report

28 August 1971	Aston Villa	2–0	Rochdale	Villa Park
	Andy Lochhead; Ray Graydon	Report

4 September 1971	Bolton Wanderers	2–0	Aston Villa
		Report

11 September 1971	Aston Villa	2–0	Brighton	Villa Park
	Ray Graydon; Chico Hamilton	Report

18 September 1971	Halifax Town	0–1	Aston Villa	The Shay
		Report	Ray Graydon

22 September 1971	Aston Villa	0–1	Mansfield Town	Villa Park
		Report

25 September 1971	Aston Villa	2–0	Wrexham	Villa Park
	Willie Anderson, pen; Ray Graydon	Report

28 September 1971	Barnsley	0–4	Aston Villa	Oakwell
		Report	Andy Lochhead (2); Chico Hamilton (2)

2 October 1971	Bristol Rovers	0–1	Aston Villa
		Report	Willie Anderson

9 October 1971	Aston Villa	1–2	Rotherham United	Villa Park
	Andy Lochhead	Report

16 October 1971	Plymouth Argyle	3–2	Aston Villa
	Bruce Rioch; Geoff Vowden	Report

20 October 1971	Aston Villa	2–0	Tranmere Rovers	Villa Park
	Bruce Rioch; Andy Lochhead	Report

23 October 1971	Bournemouth	3–0	Aston Villa	Dean Court
		Report

30 October 1971	Aston Villa	4–1	Blackburn Rovers	Villa Park
	Neil Rioch (2); Chico Hamilton; Willie Anderson	Report

6 November 1971	Port Vale	4–4	Aston Villa
	Chico Hamilton; Willie Anderson, pen; Own goal; Ray Graydon	Report

13 November 1971	Aston Villa	1–0	Notts County	Villa Park
	Ray Graydon	Report

27 November 1971	Oldham Athletic	0–6	Aston Villa	Boundary Park
		Report	Andy Lochhead (3); Willie Anderson; Bruce Rioch (2)
Note: Twenty-seven-year-old goalkeeper Jimmy Cumbes kept a clean sheet on his debut.

4 December 1971	Aston Villa	3–0	Bradford City	Villa Park
	Willie Anderson, pen; Bruce Rioch (2)	Report

18 December 1971	Aston Villa	3–2	Bolton Wanderers	Villa Park
	Andy Lochhead; Ray Graydon; Charlie Aitken	Report

27 December 1971	Swansea City	1–2	Aston Villa
		Report	Charlie Aitken; Ray Graydon

1 January 1972	Aston Villa	1–0	Halifax Town	Villa Park
	Ray Graydon	Report

8 January 1972	Rochdale	1–0	Aston Villa
		Report

19 January 1972	Aston Villa	3–0	Shrewsbury Town	Villa Park
	Chico Hamilton; Ray Graydon (2)	Report

22 January 1972	Aston Villa	2–0	Barnsley	Villa Park
	Andy Lochhead; Bruce Rioch	Report

28 January 1972	Tranmere Rovers	0–1	Aston Villa
		Report	Charlie Aitken

5 February 1972	Aston Villa	1–0	York City	Villa Park
	Willie Anderson, pen	Report

12 February 1972	Aston Villa	2–1	Bournemouth	Villa Park
	Geoff Vowden; Andy Lochhead	Report

19 February 1972	Blackburn Rovers	1–1	Aston Villa
	Andy Lochhead	Report

26 February 1972	Aston Villa	2–0	Port Vale	Villa Park
	Andy Lochhead; Pat McMahon	Report

4 March 1972	Notts County	0–3	Aston Villa
		Report	Pat McMahon (2); Ray Graydon

11 March 1972	Rotherham United	0–2	Aston Villa
		Report	Andy Lochhead; Ray Graydon
Note: Chris Nicholl made his debut

15 March 1972	Shrewsbury Town	1–1	Aston Villa
		Report	Chris Nicholl

18 March 1972	Aston Villa	0–0	Walsall	Villa Park
		Report

25 March 1972	Brighton	2–1	Aston Villa
	Bruce Rioch	Report

31 March 1972	Wrexham	0–2	Aston Villa
		Report	Willie Anderson; Ray Graydon
Note: Third Division table-toppers Aston Villa pull away from Bournemouth.

1 April 1972	Aston Villa	2–0	Swansea City	Villa Park
	Willie Anderson; Pat McMahon	Report

3 April 1972	Aston Villa	2–1	Bristol Rovers	Villa Park
	Andy Lochhead (2)	Report

8 April 1972	York City	0–1	Aston Villa
		Report	Bruce Rioch

10 April 1972	Aston Villa	1–0	Oldham Athletic	Villa Park
	Ray Graydon	Report

12 April 1972	Torquay United	2–1	Aston Villa
		Report	Geoff Vowden

19 April 1972	Chesterfield	0–4	Aston Villa
		Report	Andy Lochhead; Geoff Vowden (2); Chico Hamilton

22 April 1972	Bradford City	0–1	Aston Villa
		Report	Charlie Aitken

24 April 1972	Mansfield Town	1–1	Aston Villa
		Report	Geoff Vowden

29 April 1972	Aston Villa	5–1	Torquay United	Villa Park
	Geoff Vowden (2); Andy Lochhead; Own goal; Brian Little	Report

5 May 1972	Aston Villa	1–0	Chesterfield	Villa Park
	Ian Ross	Report

Source: avfchistory.co.uk

== FA Cup ==
At the First round proper stage the 48 clubs from the Football League Third and Fourth Divisions joined the non-league clubs who came through the qualifying rounds. To complete the round, four additional non-league clubs received byes to this stage. Telford United and Hillingdon Borough were the finalists from the previous season's FA Trophy competition, while Skelmersdale United and Dagenham were the finalists from the previous season's FA Amateur Cup.

Matches were scheduled to be played on Saturday, 20 November 1971. As a third division club Villa were required to compete in the first round joined those non-league clubs having come through the qualifying rounds. Villa were knocked out by Fourth Division Southend.

Tie no	Home team	Score	Away team	Date	Attendance	Notes
22	Southend United	1–0	Aston Villa	20 November 1971	16,929	

== League Cup ==
=== First round ===
Home team	Score	Away team	Date
Aston Villa	2–2	Wrexham	18 August 1971

Replay

Home team	Score	Away team	Date
Wrexham	1–1aet	Aston Villa	23 August 1971

2nd Replay

Home team	Score	Away team	Date
Aston Villa	4–3	Wrexham	31 August 1971

=== Second round ===
Home team	Score	Away team	Date
Chesterfield	2–3	Aston Villa	8 September 1971

=== Third round ===
Home team	Score	Away team	Date
Crystal Palace	2–2	Aston Villa	5 October 1971

Replay

Home team	Score	Away team	Date
Aston Villa	2–0	Crystal Palace	13 October 1971

=== Fourth round ===
Home team	Score	Away team	Date
Blackpool	4–1	Aston Villa	26 October 1971
