= Fred Turnbull (footballer, born 1946) =

English footballer

Personal information
- Date of birth: 26 August 1946 (age 80)
- Place of birth: Wallsend, England
- Height: 6 ft 0 in (1.83 m)
- Position: Central defender

Senior career*
Years	Team	Apps	(Gls)
1966–1974	Aston Villa	161	(3)
1969–1970	→ Halifax Town (loan)	7	(0)
Total		168	(3)
- * Club domestic league appearances and goals

Fred Turnbull (born 28 August 1946) is an English former professional footballer who played as a defender for Aston Villa from 1966 to 1974. He had a twin brother who loved football also and an older sister.

== Playing career ==
Turnbull started his career at First Division Aston Villa in September 1966. He joined Halifax Town on a two-month loan in October 1969.

Despite the club's decline, Villa managed to reach the final of the League Cup in 1971. Turnbull was in the first eleven for the Wembley final played in front of 100,000 spectators; Villa lost out 2–0 to Tottenham Hotspur after two late goals from Martin Chivers. The "Villans" built on their cup run however, and were promoted in 1971–72 after finishing top of the Third Division. Turnbull was forced to retire due to injury in 1974, after 183 appearances and 3 goals for Aston Villa in all competitions.

== Career statistics ==
Appearances and goals by club, season and competition
Club	Season	League			FA Cup		League Cup		Total	
Club	Season	Division	Apps	Goals	Apps	Goals	Apps	Goals	Apps	Goals
Aston Villa	1967–68	Second Division	11	0	0	0	0	0	11	0
Aston Villa	1968–69	Second Division	29	0	4	0	1	0	34	0
Aston Villa	1969–70	Second Division	12	0	1	0	0	0	13	0
Aston Villa	1970–71	Third Division	41	3	1	0	9	0	51	3
Aston Villa	1971–72	Third Division	37	0	1	0	5	0	43	0
Aston Villa	1972–73	Second Division	21	0	0	0	0	0	21	0
Aston Villa	1973–74	Second Division	10	0	0	0	0	0	10	0
Aston Villa	Total		161	3	7	0	15	0	183	3
Halifax Town (loan)	1969–70	Third Division	7	0	Unknown				7	0
Career total			168	3	7	0	15	0	190	3

== Honours ==
Aston Villa

- Football League Cup runner-up: 1970–71
