= Lew Chatterley =

English footballer and coach

Personal information
- Full name: Lawson Colin Chatterley
- Date of birth: 15 February 1945 (age 81)
- Place of birth: Birmingham, England
- Position: Midfielder

Youth career
- 1960–1962: Aston Villa

Senior career*
Years	Team	Apps	(Gls)
1962–1971	Aston Villa	153	(26)
1971	→Doncaster Rovers (loan)	9	(0)
1971–1972	Northampton Town	23	(2)
1972–1974	Grimsby Town	73	(16)
1974–1975	Southampton	9	(0)
1975–1977	Torquay United	57	(10)
1977–1978	Barnstaple Town		

Managerial career
- 1987–1988: Poole Town
- 1989: Reading (caretaker)
- 1994: Southampton (caretaker)
- * Club domestic league appearances and goals

Lawson Colin Chatterley (born 15 February 1945) is an English former professional football player and coach. He represented England at Youth level.

He remained at Villa Park for over 9 years, playing under Joe Mercer, Dick Taylor, Tommy Cummings, Tommy Docherty and Vic Crowe while making 153 league appearances and scoring 26 goals. During his stay at Villa Park, Aston Villa were relegated from Division 1 in 1967 and again from Division 2 in 1970.

== Playing career ==
Chatterley was born in Birmingham and began his career as an apprentice at Aston Villa, turning professional in February 1962, with his league debut coming the following season. He remained at Villa Park for over 9 years, playing under Joe Mercer, Dick Taylor, Tommy Cummings, Tommy Docherty and Vic Crowe while making 153 league appearances and scoring 26 goals. During his stay at Villa Park, Aston Villa were relegated from the First Division in 1966–67 and again from the Second Division in 1969–70.

On 21 August 1965, Chatterley was officially named as Villa's first substitute in the season opener away to Sheffield United. He was not however, called upon during the game.

His final appearance came in November 1970 under Vic Crowe in losing 3–1 to Torquay at Plainmoor.

In March 1971 he joined Doncaster Rovers on loan, where he first met Lawrie McMenemy, who was to have a considerable influence on his later career. With his time at Villa at an end, Chatterley was sold to Northampton Town in September 1971 for £8,000. His stay at Northampton was only a short one, rejoining McMenemy at Grimsby Town in February 1972 for £8,000. In his first season at Blundell Park, Grimsby were champions of Division 4, and spent the next 2 seasons in Division 3, finishing in a creditable 9th and then 6th place.

He scored 16 times in 73 league games for Grimsby before a £15,000 move to Southampton in March 1974, once again linking up with McMenemy. He played the last two games of Saints' 1973–74 relegation season. As the team struggled to shine in the Second Division, Chatterley became the butt of the crowd's frustration, and, in February 1975, he moved to Torquay United as player-coach, where he was to play a further 57 league games and score 10 goals.

== Coaching career ==
After leaving Torquay he played for North Devon non-league side Barnstaple Town and opened a guest house. However, he was lured back into football, firstly as coach of Chicago Sting in the U.S., and then, in 1979, as McMenemy's right-hand-man back at Southampton. During his 6-year spell at The Dell, Saints enjoyed some of their finest moments including briefly topping the Football League tables in January 1982 (finishing the 1981–82 season in 7th place), and then finishing the 1983–84 season as runners-up to Liverpool.

In 1985, he chose to accompany McMenemy to Sunderland, despite being in contention for the vacant manager's job at The Dell. McMenemy's sacking in April 1987 precipitated Chatterley's resignation from his position at Roker Park a few weeks later.

He returned to the Southampton area in 1987 and was manager of The Clump Inn in Chilworth, and took a role as manager at Poole Town.

Chatterley became Ian Branfoot's assistant at Reading in June 1988. In October 1989, he acted as caretaker manager following Branfoot's sacking, handing over the reins to Ian Porterfield in November.

In January 1990, Chatterley returned to The Dell as a youth development officer, and, in July 1991, once again became a coach under Ian Branfoot who had recently been appointed Southampton's manager.

In January 1994, following Branfoot's departure, he briefly acted as caretaker manager in tandem with Dave Merrington, taking charge of the team for one match, before Alan Ball's appointment. He was then promoted to the role of assistant manager, a post he retained until the appointment of Graeme Souness in July 1996.

He then joined Newcastle United for a brief spell as a scout, before retraining as a teacher.

From 1998 to 2016, Chatterley was full-time football coach at Winchester College. He enjoyed considerable success there, with the school reaching the semi-finals of the Independent Schools Cup for the first time.

== Honours ==
Aston Villa

- Football League Cup runner-up: 1962–63
