= 1973–74 Aston Villa F.C. season =

English football club season

Aston Villa
1973–74 season
- Chairman: Doug Ellis
- Manager: Vic Crowe
- Stadium: Villa Park
- Second Division: 14th
- FA Cup: Fifth round
- League Cup: Second round

The 1973–74 English football season was Aston Villa's 75th season in the Football League, this season playing in the Football League Second Division. Under manager Vic Crowe this was their 2nd year in the Second Division following promotion from the Third Division. But Vic Crowe was sacked in April 1974. Ron Saunders was appointed manager in June 1974.

The New Year's Day fixture saw Villa draw 0–0 with Millwall before a home crowd of 20,905 leaving Villa in 13th position. Within the month, Arsenal fall at the feet of Sammy Morgan.

There were debut appearances for Sammy Morgan (40), Trevor Hockey (24), Jake Findlay (14) and Bobby Campbell (10) and Roy Stark (2).

== Second Division ==
Pos	Team	Pld	W	D	L	GF	GA	GAv	Pts
12	Millwall	42	14	14	14	51	51	1.000	42
13	Fulham	42	16	10	16	39	43	0.907	42
14	Aston Villa	42	13	15	14	48	45	1.067	41
15	Portsmouth	42	14	12	16	45	62	0.726	40
16	Bristol City	42	14	10	18	47	54	0.870	38

Rules for classification: 1) Points; 2) Goal average; 3) Goals scored

=== Matches ===
25 August 1973	Aston Villa	2–0	Preston	Villa Park
	Charlie Aitken, Trevor Hockey	Report
Note: Trevor Hockey made his Villa debut.

1 September 1973	Millwall	1–1	Aston Villa
		Report	Brian Little

8 September 1973	Aston Villa	2–0	Oxford	Villa Park
	Bruce Rioch (pen), Geoff Vowden	Report

11 September 1973	Crystal Palace	0–0	Aston Villa
		Report

15 September 1973	Middlesbrough	0–0	Aston Villa
		Report

19 September 1973	Aston Villa	1–1	Fulham	Villa Park
	Bruce Rioch	Report

22 September 1973	Aston Villa	2–2	Leyton Orient	Villa Park
	Bruce Rioch, Geoff Vowden	Report

29 September 1973	Notts County	2–0	Aston Villa
		Report

2 October 1973	Fulham	1–0	Aston Villa
		Report

6 October 1973	Aston Villa	5–0	Cardiff	Villa Park
	Own Goal, Ray Graydon, Bruce Rioch (2), Sammy Morgan	Report

13 October 1973	Bolton	1–2	Aston Villa
		Report	Alun Evans (2)

20 October 1973	Aston Villa	2–2	Bristol City	Villa Park
	Brian Little, Ray Graydon	Report

23 October 1973	Aston Villa	2–1	Crystal Palace	Villa Park
	Brian Little, Ray Graydon	Report

27 October 1973	Nottingham Forest	1–2	Aston Villa
		Report	Ray Graydon, Charlie Aitken

3 November 1973	Aston Villa	1–0	Sheffield Wednesday	Villa Park
	Brian Little	Report

10 November 1973	Portsmouth	2–0	Aston Villa
		Report

17 November 1973	Aston Villa	1–1	Hull	Villa Park
	Brian Little	Report

24 November 1973	Swindon	1–0	Aston Villa
		Report

8 December 1973	Sunderland	2–0	Aston Villa
		Report

15 December 1973	Luton	1–0	Aston Villa
		Report

22 December 1973	Aston Villa	1–1	Notts County	Villa Park
	Bruce Rioch	Report

26 December 1973	West Bromwich Albion	2–0	Aston Villa
		Report

29 December 1973	Oxford	1–2	Aston Villa
		Report	Ray Graydon

1 January 1974	Aston Villa	0–0	Millwall	Villa Park
		Report

12 January 1974	Aston Villa	1–1	Middlesbrough	Villa Park
	Bruce Rioch	Report

19 January 1974	Preston	0–0	Aston Villa
		Report

2 February 1974	Aston Villa	0–1	Luton	Villa Park
		Report

23 February 1974	Cardiff	0–1	Aston Villa
		Report	Ray Graydon

27 February 1974	Aston Villa	1–1	Bolton	Villa Park
	Pat McMahon	Report

2 March 1974	Aston Villa	1–3	West Bromwich Albion	Villa Park
	Sammy Morgan	Report

13 March 1974	Aston Villa	2–1	Carlisle	Villa Park
	Alun Evans, Chico Hamilton (pen)	Report

16 March 1974	Bristol City	0–1	Aston Villa
		Report	Sammy Morgan

23 March 1974	Aston Villa	4–1	Portsmouth	Villa Park
	Pat McMahon (2), Sammy Morgan (2)	Report

1 April 1974	Sheffield Wednesday	2–4	Aston Villa
		Report	Brian Little (2), Pat McMahon, Keith Leonard

6 April 1974	Aston Villa	1–1	Swindon	Villa Park
	Brian Little	Report

13 April 1974	Hull	1–1	Aston Villa
		Report	Own Goal

15 April 1974	Aston Villa	0–1	Blackpool	Villa Park
		Report

16 April 1974	Blackpool	2–1	Aston Villa
		Report	Chico Hamilton

20 April 1974	Aston Villa	1–2	Sunderland	Villa Park
	Pat McMahon	Report

24 April 1974	Aston Villa	3–1	Nottingham Forest	Villa Park
	Chico Hamilton, Bobby Campbell, Ray Graydon	Report

27 April 1974	Carlisle	2–0	Aston Villa
		Report

3 May 1974	Leyton Orient	1–1	Aston Villa
		Report	Ray Graydon (pen)

Source: avfchistory.co.uk

== FA Cup ==
Tie no	Home team	Score	Away team	Date
7	Aston Villa	3–1	Chester	5 January 1974

=== Fourth round ===
The matches were scheduled for Saturday, 26 January 1974. Four matches were, however, played the day after. Eight matches were drawn, of which one, the tie between Portsmouth and Leyton Orient, required a second replay.

Tie no	Home team	Score	Away team	Date
14	Arsenal	1–1	Aston Villa	26 January 1974
Replay	Aston Villa	2–0	Arsenal	30 January 1974

=== Fifth round ===
The matches were scheduled for Saturday, 16 February 1974 with one taking place the day after. Two matches were drawn and went to replays.

Tie no	Home team	Score	Away team	Date
2	Burnley	1–0	Aston Villa	16 February 1974

== League Cup ==
For the Second round: The 28 first round winners were joined by the remaining clubs from the Second Division and all from the First Division. Ties were straight knockout games, with additional replays if required. The original games were staged on 2/8–10 October 1973.

Tie no	Home team	Score^{1}	Away team	Attendance	Date
20	York City	1–0	Aston Villa	7,981	9 October 1973
