= 1968–69 Aston Villa F.C. season =

English football club season

Aston Villa
1968–69 season
- President: Sir Theodore Pritchett
- Chairman: (1) Norman Smith (2) Doug Ellis
- Manager: (1) Tommy Cummings (2) Arthur Cox (caretaker) (3) Tommy Docherty
- Stadium: Villa Park
- Second Division: 18th
- FA Cup: Fifth round
- League Cup: Second round

Second City Derby
- 31--23--23

The 1968–69 English football season was Aston Villa's 70th season in the Football League, playing in the Football League Second Division for the second consecutive season. The era was one of conspicuous underachievement. Aston Villa had been in decline for several years; the club had an ageing five-man board "who had failed to adapt to the new football reality". The club had neither developed a scouting network nor an effective coaching structure.

Events off the pitch came to a head in November 1968. With Villa lying at the bottom of Division Two, the board sacked Tommy Cummings, installing first-team trainer-coach, Arthur Cox, as caretaker. On 21 November 1968 the problems in the boardroom were highlighted when, under pressure from a militant group of supporters and shareholders, board member George Robinson resigned. Following his resignation, the board issued a statement: "[The board] would make available, by their resignation, such seats as new financial arrangements might require". Aston Villa F.C. was up for sale. After much speculation London financier Pat Matthews was tasked with restructuring the finances and installing new directors. He recruited Tommy Docherty and brought in local travel agent Doug Ellis as chair of the new board that was convened on 16 December 1968. Two days later Docherty was appointed as manager, his third club in six weeks after his resignation from Rotherham United and a brief spell at Queens Park Rangers.

In the pre-season, newspapers reported the arrival of Argentinian International Oscar Arce, formerly of Peñarol and Rosario Central. He was reportedly valued at £100,000 (at the time Martin Chivers was the League record signing at £125,000). Following Arce joining, in July 1968, Peter Doherty was appointed chief scout. Arce made seven appearance for the reserves, but, while skilful, he was criticised for his temperament, fitness and lack of effort. The club bought him out of his contract. There were debuts for Brian Tiler (107), Mike Ferguson (38), Dave Simmons (17), John Griffiths (3), John Chambers (2), and Barry Lynch (2). After just two years at Blackburn Barrie Hole (47) moved, this time to Aston Villa for £60,000 in September 1968. In a disappointing season, Hole won the Aston Villa Lions Club Terrace Trophy for the best player at Aston Villa as decided by the fans.

== Second Division ==
Pos	Team	Pld	W	D	L	GF	GA	GAv	Pts
16	Bristol City	42	11	16	15	46	53	0.868	38
17	Bolton Wanderers	42	12	14	16	55	67	0.821	38
18	Aston Villa	42	12	14	16	37	48	0.771	38
19	Blackburn Rovers	42	13	11	18	52	63	0.825	37
20	Oxford United	42	12	9	21	34	55	0.618	33

Rules for classification: 1) Points; 2) Goal average; 3) Goals scored

Matches

10 August 1968 1	Sheffield United	3–1	Aston Villa	Bramall Lane
		Report	(Willie Anderson), 79' (pen.)
Note: Mike Ferguson made his debut.

17 August 1968 2	Aston Villa	1–1	Fulham	Villa Park
	(John Woodward), 84'	Report
Note:

19 August 1968 3	Aston Villa	1–1	Millwall	Villa Park
	(Willie Anderson), 26' (pen.)	Report

24 August 1968 4	Blackburn Rovers	2–0	Aston Villa	Ewood Park
		Report

26 August 1968 5	Aston Villa	1–0	Bristol City	Villa Park
	(John Woodward), 73'	Report

31 August 1968 6	Aston Villa	0–1	Blackpool	Villa Park
		Report
Note: Manager Tommy Cummings had set a target of ten points from the first six matches. Defeat to Blackpool meant they had actually achieved four.

7 September 1968 7	Derby County	3–1	Aston Villa	Baseball Ground
		Report	(Mike Ferguson), 86'

14 September 1968 8	Aston Villa	1–1	Hull City	Villa Park
	(Willie Anderson), 46'	Report

18 September 1968 9	Bolton Wanderers	4–1	Aston Villa	Burnden Park
		Report	(Brian Godfrey), 64'

21 September 1968 10	Birmingham City	4–0	Aston Villa	St Andrew's
		Report
Note: In the Second City derby both teams won their home game.

28 September 1968 11	Aston Villa	2–0	Oxford United	Villa Park
	(Barrie Hole), 42' (Brian Godfrey), 83'	Report

5 October 1968 12	Cardiff City	1–1	Aston Villa	Ninian Park
		Report	(Brian Godfrey), 72'

8 October 1968 13	Bristol City	1–0	Aston Villa	Ashton Gate
		Report

12 October 1968 14	Aston Villa	1–1	Crystal Palace	Villa Park
	(Willie Anderson), 78' (pen.)	Report

19 October 1968 15	Norwich City	1–1	Aston Villa	Carrow Road
		Report	(Lew Chatterley), 3'

26 October 1968 16	Aston Villa	0–0	Carlisle United	Villa Park
		Report

2 November 1968 17	Huddersfield Town	3–1	Aston Villa	Leeds Road
		Report	(Mike Ferguson), 3'

9 November 1968 18	Aston Villa	0–1	Preston North End	Villa Park
		Report
Note:

16 November 1968 19	Portsmouth	2–0	Aston Villa	Fratton Park
		Report
Note:

23 November 1968 20	Aston Villa	1–0	Middlesbrough	Villa Park
	(Own goal), 73'	Report		Attendance: 15,281
Note:

30 November 1968 21	Bury	3–2	Aston Villa	Gigg Lane
		Report	(John Woodward), 50' (Willie Anderson), 59'
Note:

7 December 1968 22	Aston Villa	0–0	Charlton Athletic	Villa Park
		Report		Attendance: 12,747
Note: The lowest gate of the season. GK John Dunn, CBs Dick Edwards, Fred Turnbull, RB Mick Wright, LB Charlie Aitken, Ms Alan Deakin, (33' for Brian Greenhalgh), Lionel Martin, Mike Ferguson, Willie Anderson, F Brian Godfrey, Peter Broadbent.

14 December 1968 23	Crystal Palace	4–2	Aston Villa	Selhurst Park
		Report	(Lionel Martin), 75' (Dick Edwards), 88'
Note:

21 December 1968 24	Aston Villa	2–1	Norwich City	Villa Park
	(Dick Edwards), 4' (Barrie Hole), 82'	Report		Attendance: 19,923
Note: Barrie Hole, returning from a two-week club suspension, scored the second. The pre-Christmas fixture was typically the lowest gate of the season but, on 18 December Tommy Docherty had been announced the manager, and an additional 7,000 attended in comparison to the previous home game. Despite his appointment, Docherty left Arthur Cox and Peter Doherty in charge of the team, choosing to observe the match as a learning exercise.

26 December 1968 25	Aston Villa	2–0	Cardiff City	Villa Park
	(Barrie Hole), 31' (Brian Tiler), 70'	Report		Attendance: 41,250
Note: Brian Tiler scored the second on his debut on an 'unplayable' icy pitch. Tiler had been with Tommy Docherty at Rotherham and was the reason the new manager had only lasted 29 days at his previous club, Queens Park Rangers. Docherty had wished to sign Tiler but Rangers' chairman, John Gregory, baulked at Rotherham's £100,000 asking price prompting Docherty to walk-out on the club. The new Villa chairman, Doug Ellis managed to half the asking price and Tiler was installed as club captain in a team that had long since lost its way. The pre-Christmas fixture had typically been the lowest gate of the season but a healthy 19,923 had attended, buoyed by the new regime. Dochery went to the local papers: "My name is not Oliver, its Tommy. The 19,000 for Norwich was great. But please can I have some more...". Despite the atrocious weather, he was not disappointed.

28 December 1968 26	Carlisle United	0–1	Aston Villa	Brunton Park
		Report	(Willie Anderson), 65'
Note: With many matches postponed due to weather, the media spotlight fell on this match. Carlisle were previously thirteen matches unbeaten but were undone by a single Willie Anderson goal on a rock-hard pitch. Carlisle manager Bob Stokoe was ungracious in defeat stating "I would rather sweep the streets than play like that..." referring to Villa's negative play and time-wasting tactics. Docherty hit back at Stokoe stating "he could get his fingers burnt" and threatened a complaint to the Football League.

11 January 1969 27	Aston Villa	1–0	Huddersfield Town	Villa Park
	(Barrie Hole), 8'	Report

18 January 1969 28	Preston North End	1–0	Aston Villa	Deepdale
		Report

1 February 1969 29	Aston Villa	2–0	Portsmouth	Villa Park
	(Dave Rudge), 53' (Brian Godfrey), 78'	Report

15 February 1969 30	Aston Villa	1–0	Bury	Villa Park
	(Dave Rudge), 73'	Report

22 February 1969 31	Charlton Athletic	1–1	Aston Villa	The Valley
		Report	(Dave Simmons), 4'

1 March 1969 32	Aston Villa	3–1	Sheffield United	Villa Park
	(Barrie Hole), 4' (Dave Simmons), 58' (Dave Simmons), 69'	Report

4 March 1969 33	Middlesbrough	0–0	Aston Villa	Ayresome Park
		Report

8 March 1969 34	Fulham	1–1	Aston Villa	Craven Cottage
		Report	(Own goal), 15'

15 March 1969 35	Aston Villa	1–1	Blackburn Rovers	Villa Park
	(Dave Simmons), 39'	Report

22 March 1969 36	Blackpool	1–1	Aston Villa	Bloomfield Road
		Report	(Brian Godfrey), 2'

29 March 1969 37	Aston Villa	0–1	Derby County	Villa Park
		Report

4 April 1969 38	Millwall	0–1	Aston Villa	The Den
		Report	(Lionel Martin), 83'

5 April 1969 39	Oxford United	0–1	Aston Villa	Manor Ground
		Report

8 April 1969 40	Aston Villa	1–1	Bolton Wanderers	Villa Park
	(Own goal), 14'	Report

12 April 1969 41	Aston Villa	1–0	Birmingham City	Villa Park
	(Dave Simmons), 55'	Report
Note: In the Second City derby both teams won their home game.

19 April 1969 42	Hull City	1–0	Aston Villa	Boothferry Park
		Report
Note:

Source: avfchistory.co.uk

== FA Cup ==
=== Third round proper ===
The 44 First and Second Division clubs entered the competition at this stage. The matches were scheduled for Saturday, 4 January 1969. Seven matches were drawn and went to replays. Kettering Town was the last non-league club left in the competition.

Tie no	Home team	Score	Away team	Date
8	Aston Villa	2–1	Queens Park Rangers	4 January 1969

=== Fourth round proper ===
The matches were scheduled for Saturday, 25 January 1969. Six matches were drawn and went to replays.

Tie no	Home team	Score	Away team	Date
3	Southampton	2–2	Aston Villa	25 January 1969
Replay	Aston Villa	2–1	Southampton	29 January 1969

=== Fifth round proper ===
The matches were scheduled for Saturday, 8 February 1969. However, for the first time in history, the entire fifth round draw for the FA Cup was unable to be played due to heavy snowfall across England, and the matches were replayed at various times after this date. Most took place by the following Wednesday (one of these requiring a replay), two were played a fortnight later, but the final match was not played until 1 March and required a replay two days later.

Tie no	Home team	Score	Away team	Date
5	Tottenham Hotspur	3–2	Aston Villa	12 February 1969

== League Cup ==
=== Second round ===
Home team	Score	Away team	Date
Aston Villa	1–4	Tottenham Hotspur	4 September 1968
