= 1967–68 Aston Villa F.C. season =

English football club season

Aston Villa
1967–68 season
- Chairman: Norman Smith
- Manager: Tommy Cummings
- Stadium: Villa Park
- Second Division: 16th
- FA Cup: Fourth round
- League Cup: Second round

Second City Derby
- 30--22--23

The 1967–68 English football season was Aston Villa's 69th season in the Football League, this season playing in the Football League Second Division following relegation the previous season. The era was one of conspicuous underachievement. Villa had been in decline for several years; the club had an ageing five-man board "who had failed to adapt to the new football reality".

The former player-manager of promotion winning Mansfield Town, 38-year-old Tommy Cummings was appointed Aston Villa manager in the summer of 1967 reportedly on a three-year contract at £5,000 per year. His predecessor, Dick Taylor's heavy investment in new players had failed disastrously plunging the club into deep financial trouble. Taylor, chief scout Jimmy Easson and second team coach Johnny Dixon were sacked not long after the club had been relegated. Cummings failed to rebuild the scouting network nor an effective coaching structure. According to Villa's longest-serving player, Charlie Aitken, Cummings did little to prevent Villa's slide down the tables. He was a drinker and the players had little respect for him. The fans' calls for the board to resign became more and more pronounced when Villa finished 16th.

Brian Godfrey (143) was transferred, with Brian Greenhalgh (40), from Preston North End in September 1967. Godfrey scored on his Villa debut, and he and Greenhalgh scored 18 goals between them in their first 17 games in Villa colours. Other debuts included Fred Turnbull (161), John Dunn (101), Tommy Mitchinson (49), John Inglis (3), and Dick Edwards.

== Second Division ==
Pos	Team	Pld	W	D	L	GF	GA	GAv	Pts
14	Huddersfield Town	42	13	12	17	46	61	0.754	38
15	Charlton Athletic	42	12	13	17	63	68	0.926	37
16	Aston Villa	42	15	7	20	54	64	0.844	37
17	Hull City	42	12	13	17	58	73	0.795	37
18	Derby County	42	13	10	19	71	78	0.910	36

Rules for classification: 1) Points; 2) Goal average; 3) Goals scored

=== Matches ===
19 August 1967 1	Norwich City	1–0	Aston Villa	Carrow Road
		Report

23 August 1967 2	Plymouth Argyle	2–1	Aston Villa	Home Park
		Report	Barry Stobart 60

26 August 1967 3	Aston Villa	3–1	Rotherham United	Villa Park
	Dave Rudge 13; Barry Stobart 20; Willie Anderson 48	Report

28 August 1967 4	Aston Villa	0–1	Plymouth Argyle	Villa Park
		Report

2 September 1967 5	Derby County	3–1	Aston Villa
		Report	(Barry Stobart), 5'

5 September 1967 6	Queens Park Rangers	3–0	Aston Villa
		Report

9 September 1967 7	Aston Villa	1–0	Preston North End	Villa Park
	(Bobby Park), 29'	Report

16 September 1967 8	Charlton Athletic	3–0	Aston Villa
		Report

23 September 1967 9	Aston Villa	0–1	Crystal Palace	Villa Park
		Report
Note: Tommy Cummings assessed his own performance in his first ten matches at Villa: "We took four points out of 18 and got knocked out of the Football League Cup at Northampton. You never recover from a start like that".

30 September 1967 10	Middlesbrough	1–1	Aston Villa
		Report	(Brian Godfrey), 27'
Note: Fred Turnbull made his debut.

7 October 1967 11	Aston Villa	2–4	Birmingham City	Villa Park
	(Brian Greenhalgh), 4'; (Brian Godfrey), 30'	Report
Note: In the Second City derby Villa lost both matches.

14 October 1967 12	Millwall	1–2	Aston Villa
		Report	(Brian Godfrey), 42'; (Brian Greenhalgh), 76'

21 October 1967 13	Aston Villa	3–2	Blackpool	Villa Park
	(Willie Anderson), 20'; (Brian Greenhalgh), 29'; (Tommy Mitchinson), 47'	Report

4 November 1967 14	Aston Villa	1–0	Carlisle United	Villa Park
	(Tommy Mitchinson), 58'	Report

11 November 1967 15	Ipswich Town	2–1	Aston Villa
		Report	(Brian Godfrey), 21'

18 November 1967 16	Aston Villa	2–3	Hull City	Villa Park
	(Brian Greenhalgh), 42'; (Brian Greenhalgh), 73'	Report

25 November 1967 17	Bolton Wanderers	2–3	Aston Villa
		Report	(Brian Greenhalgh), 23'; (Brian Godfrey), 57'; (Mike Tindall), 88'

2 December 1967 18	Aston Villa	0–0	Huddersfield Town	Villa Park
		Report

16 December 1967 19	Aston Villa	4–2	Norwich City	Villa Park
	(Tommy Mitchinson), 15'; (John Woodward), 36'; (Tommy Mitchinson), 55'; (Brian Greenhalgh), 69'	Report

23 December 1967 20	Rotherham United	0–2	Aston Villa
		Report	(Brian Greenhalgh), 80'; (Tommy Mitchinson), 87'	Attendance: 10,252

26 December 1967 21	Cardiff City	3–0	Aston Villa
		Report

30 December 1967 22	Aston Villa	2–1	Cardiff City	Villa Park
	(Brian Greenhalgh), 61'; (Willie Anderson), 78'	Report

6 January 1968 23	Aston Villa	2–1	Derby County	Villa Park
	(Brian Greenhalgh), 46'; (Johnny MacLeod), 63'	Report

20 January 1968 24	Aston Villa	4–1	Charlton Athletic	Villa Park
	(Johnny MacLeod), 1'; (Brian Greenhalgh), 55'; (Brian Godfrey), 66'; (John Woodward), 84'	Report
Note: The 23-year-old goal-keeper, John Dunn made his debut.

3 February 1968 25	Crystal Palace	0–1	Aston Villa
		Report	(Brian Godfrey), 30'

10 February 1968 26	Aston Villa	0–1	Middlesbrough	Villa Park
		Report

24 February 1968 27	Birmingham City	2–1	Aston Villa
		Report	(Brian Godfrey), 42'
Note: In the Second City derby Villa lost both matches.

27 February 1968 28	Bristol City	0–0	Aston Villa
		Report

2 March 1968 29	Aston Villa	3–1	Millwall	Villa Park
	(Willie Anderson), 29' (pen.); (Willie Anderson), 42'; (Tommy Mitchinson), 46'	Report
Note: Winger Willie Anderson powered Villa back into the lead after they had been trailing Millwall.

13 March 1968 30	Blackburn Rovers	2–1	Aston Villa
		Report	(Dave Rudge), 88'

16 March 1968 31	Blackpool	1–0	Aston Villa
		Report
Note: Dick Edwards made his Villa debut.

18 March 1968 32	Preston North End	2–1	Aston Villa
		Report	(Brian Greenhalgh), 5'

23 March 1968 33	Aston Villa	1–2	Blackburn Rovers	Villa Park
	(Tommy Mitchinson), 78'	Report

30 March 1968 34	Carlisle United	1–2	Aston Villa
		Report	(Dave Rudge), 23'; (Brian Godfrey), 43'

6 April 1968 35	Aston Villa	2–2	Ipswich Town	Villa Park
	(Tommy Mitchinson), 9'; (Brian Godfrey), 31'	Report

13 April 1968 36	Hull City	3–0	Aston Villa
		Report

15 April 1968 37	Portsmouth	2–2	Aston Villa
		Report	(Own Goal), 14'; (Brian Godfrey), 31'

16 April 1968 38	Aston Villa	1–0	Portsmouth	Villa Park
	(Dave Rudge), 1'	Report

20 April 1968 39	Aston Villa	1–1	Bolton Wanderers	Villa Park
	(Lew Chatterley), 71'	Report

27 April 1968 40	Huddersfield Town	0–0	Aston Villa
		Report

4 May 1968 41	Aston Villa	2–4	Bristol City	Villa Park
	(Brian Godfrey), 3'; (Lew Chatterley), 12'	Report
Note:

11 May 1968 42	Aston Villa	1–2	Queens Park Rangers	Villa Park
	(Tommy Mitchinson), 14'	Report

Source: avfchistory.co.uk

== FA Cup ==
=== Third Round ===
The 44 First and Second Division clubs entered the competition at this stage. The matches were played on Saturday, 27 January 1968. Ten matches were drawn, with replays taking place later the same week, and one tie required a second replay.

Tie no	Home team	Score	Away team	Date	Attendance	Notes
10	Aston Villa	3–0	Millwall	27 January 1968		

=== Fourth Round ===
The matches were played on Saturday, 17 February 1968. Six matches were drawn and replayed later the same week.

Tie no	Home team	Score	Away team	Date	Attendance	Notes
2	Aston Villa	0–1	Rotherham United	17 February 1968		

== League Cup ==
=== Ties ===
Home team	Score	Away team	Date
Northampton Town	3–1	Aston Villa	13 September 1967
