= Keith Bradley =

Keith Bradley may refer to:

- Keith Bradley, Baron Bradley (born 1950), British Labour Party politician
- Keith Bradley (footballer) (born 1946), former English footballer
