= Neil Rioch =

English footballer

Personal information
- Full name: Daniel Gordon Rioch
- Date of birth: 13 April 1951 (age 75)
- Place of birth: Paddington, London, England
- Height: 5 ft 10 in (1.78 m)
- Position: Defender

Youth career
- 1966–1968: Luton Town

Senior career*
Years	Team	Apps	(Gls)
1968–1969	Luton Town	0	(0)
1969–1975	Aston Villa	22	(3)
1971	→ Toronto Metros (loan)	11	(1)
1972	→ York City (loan)	1	(0)
1972	→ Northampton Town (loan)	14	(4)
1975–1976	Plymouth Argyle	5	(0)
1976	Portland Timbers	23	(3)
Total		76	(11)

International career
1969	England youth		
- * Club domestic league appearances and goals

Daniel Gordon "Neil" Rioch (born 13 April 1951) is an English former professional footballer who played as a defender. He played in the Football League for Aston Villa, York City, Northampton Town and Plymouth Argyle, in the North American Soccer League for Toronto Metros and Portland Timbers. He is the younger brother of former Scotland captain and Villa team-mate Bruce Rioch.

Neil was one of the ball boys at the 1966 World Cup final and was the first Englishman to touch the ball following kick-off. Wolfgang Overath kicked the ball out of play from the whistle, Rioch collected and passed the ball to Martin Peters who took the first throw-in.

Rioch started on the books of Luton Town without making a league appearance.

The 18-year-old made his Villa debut on 16 Aug 1969 in 0-2 defeat away to Huddersfield at Leeds Road. He made his last appearance on 18 Feb 1975, in a 3-2 victory over Portsmouth at Fratton.

He was capped by the England national youth team in 1969.

Neil Rioch married his wife, Lynne in October 1983 at Streetly Methodist Church
