= Alan Mullery =

English footballer & manager (born 1941)

Alan Mullery MBE
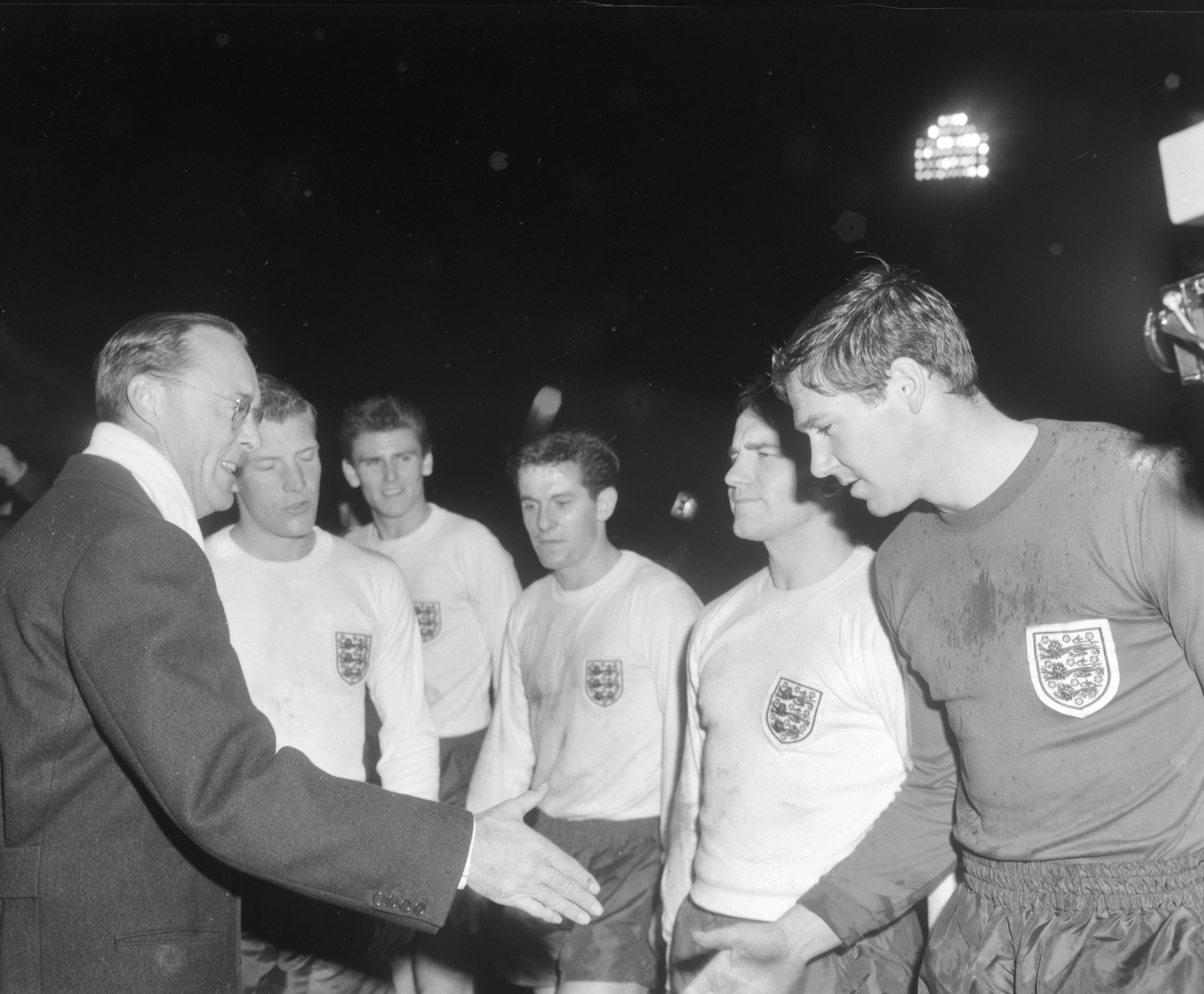
- Mullery (centre) in December 1964, prior to making his debut for England

Personal information
- Full name: Alan Patrick Mullery
- Date of birth: 23 November 1941 (age 84)
- Place of birth: Notting Hill, London, England
- Position: Midfielder

Senior career*
Years	Team	Apps	(Gls)
1958–1964	Fulham	199	(13)
1964–1972	Tottenham Hotspur	312	(25)
1972–1976	Fulham	165	(24)
1976	Durban City		
Total		677	(62)

International career
1964–1971	England	35	(1)

Managerial career
- 1976–1981: Brighton & Hove Albion
- 1981–1982: Charlton Athletic
- 1982–1984: Crystal Palace
- 1984: Queens Park Rangers
- 1986–1987: Brighton & Hove Albion
- 1990–1993: ATM FA
- 1996–1997: Barnet
- * Club domestic league appearances and goals

Alan Patrick Mullery MBE (born 23 November 1941) is an English former footballer and manager. After enjoying a successful career with Fulham, Tottenham Hotspur, and the England national team in the 1960s and 1970s, he became a manager working with several clubs. He is now employed as a television pundit. He is also known for being the first ever England player to be sent off in an international match. In 1972 he lifted the UEFA Cup for Tottenham.

== Playing career ==
Mullery played for Fulham (1958–1964, 1972–1976), Tottenham Hotspur (1964–1972) and England (1964–1971). He appeared in 364 games for Fulham (scored 37 goals), 312 for Tottenham Hotspur (scored 25 goals), and 35 for England (scored 1 goal).

Mullery was a key player for the Spurs teams that won the FA Cup in 1967, and skippering them to victory in the 1971 Football League Cup Final and the 1972 UEFA Cup Final. In the '72 UEFA Cup Final, his header in the 2nd leg was the decisive goal in a 3–2 aggregate victory over Wolverhampton Wanderers. Mullery was also in the Fulham team that lost the 1975 FA Cup Final to West Ham United.

Mullery was not included in England's squad for the 1966 FIFA World Cup but was selected to play in UEFA Euro 1968. In the game against Yugoslavia, Mullery committed a foul against Dobrivoje Trivić, and became the first England player to be sent off in a full international match. He was an integral member of England's 1970 World Cup squad, playing in all the side's games in what proved a bitterly disappointing campaign. England, the defending champions, lost 3–2 to West Germany in the quarter-finals, having been up 2–0 in the second half. In that game Mullery scored England's first goal, the only time he tallied for his country.

Playing primarily as a deep midfielder, Mullery did not get many goals. Two he did score (the 1970 World Cup strike against West Germany; a 1973–74 volley from outside the penalty area against Leicester City, voted the BBC's goal of the season) are well known and still talked about decades later.

== Managerial career ==
Mullery was Brighton & Hove Albion manager between 1976 and 1981, and took the club from the third tier to the top flight of English football. When Mullery was appointed manager of Brighton's biggest rivals Crystal Palace in 1982, it prompted anger and a short-lived boycott from some of the Palace fans.

Mullery became QPR manager in 1984 and guided the club to a 7–0 aggregate win over KR Reykjavik in the 1st round of the 1984–85 UEFA Cup, but he was then involved in an extraordinary 2nd round UEFA Cup tie against FK Partizan. In the first leg, which was played at Highbury because of UEFA's ban on the artificial plastic pitch at Loftus Road, QPR beat Partizan 6–2, despite being 2–1 behind at one stage and down to ten men after QPR defender Warren Neill was sent off. In the second leg, Partizan won 4–0 in Belgrade to win the tie on away goals. Partizan's victory was only the second time in the history of European competition where a team has overturned a four-goal first-leg deficit.

Mullery's QPR side were also involved in an extraordinary home league match in September 1984 against Newcastle United. At half-time Newcastle were 4–0 up after a hat-trick from Chris Waddle. But QPR came back after the break to draw the match 5–5. Mullery was sacked after six months in charge at Loftus Road just hours after QPR had beaten Stoke. In 1985, Mullery said that his time at QPR "turned me into a monster". He suggested that the players couldn't overcome their disappointment that Terry Venables had left the club. Mullery blamed what he called "the moaning, groaning bunch of players who treated me, themselves and their profession with contempt" for killing his love of football.

After leaving QPR, Mullery stayed out of football management for 18 months until the summer of 1986, when he took over for a second spell as manager of Brighton. He lasted seven months before being sacked in January 1987. Mullery said of his sacking by Brighton: "You love the game, then it kicks you in the guts."

In the early 1990s, Mullery coached ATM FA in the Malaysian Premier League. He later served Barnet as Director of Football during 1996–1997.

Mullery had a brief stint as manager at Sussex non-league side Southwick F.C. He has worked for a number of years as a pundit for Sky Sports, and in September 2005 also briefly took a role with Conference club Crawley Town as a 'football consultant'.

== Personal life ==
After leaving QPR, Mullery entered into a deep depression, worsened by an unsuccessful business venture; he converted to Christianity, though his financial and emotional troubles continued until he began working in the media in the mid-1990s.

Mullery was appointed Member of the Order of the British Empire (MBE) in the 1976 New Year Honours.

Mullery stated in 1972 that he was a Conservative.

== Honours ==
Tottenham Hotspur

- FA Cup: 1966–67
- Football League Cup: 1970–71
- UEFA Cup: 1971–72

Fulham

- FA Cup runner-up: 1974–75

Individual

- FWA Footballer of the Year: 1975
