= Andy Donnelly =

Scottish footballer

Personal information
- Full name: Andrew Donnelly
- Date of birth: 1 May 1943 (age 83)
- Place of birth: Lanark, Scotland
- Height: 5 ft 8 3/4 in (1.75 m)
- Position: Goalkeeper

Youth career
- Coltness United

Senior career*
Years	Team	Apps	(Gls)
1961–1963	Clyde	0	(0)
1963–1964	Millwall	0	(0)
1964–1967	Weymouth		
1967–1972	Torquay United	160	(0)
- Cape Town City
Total		160	(0)
- * Club domestic league appearances and goals

Andy Donnelly (born 1 May 1943) is a Scottish former professional footballer who played as a goalkeeper.

== Career ==
Born in Lanark, Donnelly played for Coltness United, Clyde, Millwall, Weymouth, Torquay United and Cape Town City.

Donnelly replaced John Dunn as first-team choice at Torquay United in October 1967.
