= Peter Collins (footballer) =

English footballer

Personal information
- Full name: Peter John Collins
- Date of birth: 29 November 1948 (age 77)
- Place of birth: Chelmsford, England
- Position: Central defender

Senior career*
Years	Team	Apps	(Gls)
1966–1968	Chelmsford City	8	(0)
1968–1973	Tottenham Hotspur	83	(4)
- Folkestone & Shepway

Managerial career
- Folkestone & Shepway
- 1989–1992: Braintree Town (joint)
- 1994–1995: Braintree Town
- * Club domestic league appearances and goals

Peter John Collins (born 29 November 1948) is a former professional footballer who played for Chelmsford City, and Tottenham Hotspur.

== Career ==
Born in Chelmsford to parents William and Barbara, Collins attended Moulsham Primary School before moving up to Moulsham Secondary School and resided within Westlands. Collins left school at 14 to join Crompton Metal Workers as an apprentice and whilst playing for the Saturday and Sunday football team he was spotted by the local football club, Chelmsford City and joined as an apprentice in 1965. During his time at Chelmsford he quickly became recognised as a developing talent and started to appear in the first team in 1967. Football scouts were frequently spotted at the New Writtle Street Stadium and on the day Tottenham Hotspur broke the club and British transfer record taking Martin Chivers to Tottenham for £125,000, Bill Nicholson arrived at Chelmsford City to sign Collins.

=== Tottenham Hotspur ===
Collins joined the Spurs from Chelmsford City in January 1968 for a fee of £5,000 with an addition payment due when he had made 10 first class appearances with Spurs paying Chelmsford another £5,000 within 9 months. Collins first Spurs game was for the 'A' team against Chelmsford City 'A' in a friendly as part of the transfer deal to be played at New Writtle Street. Collins scored twice within the first nine minutes in front of 48,000 fans on his first team debut in a friendly against Glasgow Rangers at White Hart Lane. The highlight of Collins' career at the club was the 2–0 win in the 1971 Football League Cup Final against Aston Villa. His career was ended through injury at the club, the central defender played a total of 106 matches plus ten as substitute and scoring eight goals in all competitions.

A strong, powerful and quick centre half Collins was one of the rare players that made the jump from non-league to the English top flight when he signed for Tottenham in 1968. His league debut was at home to Arsenal in August 1968. Collins became a popular player during his time at White Hart Lane the team he supported as a boy. In 1972, he featured along with his fellow squad members in the Hunter Davies book, "The Glory Game" about the Spurs season of 1972 when Davies was allowed full access to the changing rooms and team meetings.

Despite interest from Liverpool amongst others, Collins elected to stay at White Hart Lane and was being groomed as the long term successor to Mike England before an injury at 23 restricted development. This injury turned out to be a mis-diagnosed broken ankle. Despite a valiant effort Collins had to retire from professional football at the age of 26. Leaving the Lane just as he had entered, on his last home game scoring the first goal in the last game of the 1973 season against Sheffield United.

During his time at the club Spurs won/reached the following finals:-

- 1971 Football League Cup Final winners
- 1972 UEFA Cup final winners
- 1973 Football League Cup Final winners
- 1974 UEFA Cup final runners-up

In addition, Collins played in both legs of the 1968–69 Football League Cup semi-final versus Arsenal and were runners-up in the 1974 UEFA Cup final.

Following his time at Tottenham, Collins played for Folkestone & Shepway, also managing the club.

== Post-football career ==
Following his playing career, Collins was joint manager of Braintree Town, alongside Brian Honeywood, before being dismissed in February 1992. In 1994, Collins returned to Braintree, before being sacked a year later. He spent 25 years as a PE teacher in Chelmsford up to 2003 and is presently a property developer in Spain.

== Honours ==
Tottenham Hotspur

- Football League Cup: 1970–71
