= John Phillips (footballer) =

English-born Welsh footballer

Personal information
- Birth name: Thomas John Seymour Phillips
- Date of birth: 7 July 1951
- Place of birth: Shrewsbury
- Date of death: 31 March 2017 (aged 65)
- Position: Goalkeeper

Senior career*
Years	Team	Apps	(Gls)
1968–1969	Shrewsbury Town	51	(0)
1969	Aston Villa	15	(0)
1970–1980	Chelsea	125	(0)
1980	Crewe Alexandra	6	(0)
1980–1981	Brighton & Hove Albion	1	(0)
1981–1982	Charlton Athletic	2	(0)
1982	Crystal Palace	0	(0)
1982–1983	Sea Bee		
Total		200	(0)

International career
1973–1974	Wales	4	(0)
- * Club domestic league appearances and goals

Thomas John Seymour Phillips (7 July 1951 – 31 March 2017) was a Welsh footballer who played as a goalkeeper for various English clubs and the Welsh national team.

Phillips started out with his home town club, Shrewsbury Town, for whom he made 51 appearances, before transferring to Aston Villa at the age of 18. After only a handful of matches for Villa, Phillips joined Chelsea in August 1970 for £25,000. He was to spend the majority of his career with the west London club as the long-term understudy to Peter Bonetti and only once, in 1974–75, was he to make over 30 appearances in a season for the club. He made a total of 149 appearances for Chelsea.

He left Chelsea in 1980 and had brief spells with Crewe Alexandra, Brighton & Hove Albion, Charlton Athletic, Crystal Palace and Sea Bee in Hong Kong. John Toshack signed Phillips for Swansea City in the early Eighties, but he never made the first team. He also won 4 caps for the Wales national team. Phillips died in 2017 at the age of 65 after a long illness.
