= 1970–71 Football League Cup =

Tournament details
- Country: England; Wales
- Teams: 91

Final positions
- Champions: Tottenham Hotspur (1st title)
- Runners-up: Aston Villa

Tournament statistics
- Top goal scorer(s): Brian Kidd; Martin Chivers (5 goals)

The 1970–71 Football League Cup was the 11th season of the Football League Cup, a knock-out competition for England's top 92 football clubs. The tournament started on 17 August 1970 and ended with the final at Wembley Stadium, London. Tottenham Hotspur won the tournament for the first time after defeating Aston Villa.

This was to be the last season in which it was not compulsory to enter the tournament. The only team who did not enter in 1970–71 was Everton, the league's defending champions. After 1971–72 entry to the tournament became compulsory.

== Calendar ==
Of the 91 teams, 37 received a bye to the second round (teams ranked 2nd–38th in the 1969–70 Football League) and the other 54 played in the first round. Semi-finals were two-legged.

Round	Main date	Fixtures		Clubs	New entries this round
Round	Main date	Original	Replays	Clubs	New entries this round
First Round	19 August 1970	27	5	91 → 64	54 (teams ranked 17th–22nd in Second Division; all Third and Fourth Division)
Second Round	9 September 1970	32	12	64 → 32	37 (teams ranked 1st–16th in Second Division; all First Division except Everton)
Third Round	7 October 1970	16	3	32 → 16	none
Fourth Round	28 October 1970	8	4	16 → 8	none
Fifth Round	17/18 November 1970	4	2	8 → 4	none
Semi-finals	16 & 23 December 1970	4	0	4 → 2	none
Final	27 February 1971	1	0	2 → 1	none

== First round ==
=== Ties ===
Home team	Score	Away team	Date
Aldershot	1–0	Brentford	18 August 1970
Aston Villa	4–0	Notts County	18 August 1970
Barnsley	0–1	Rotherham United	19 August 1970
Birmingham City	3–3	Wrexham	17 August 1970
Bristol Rovers	1–0	Brighton & Hove Albion	17 August 1970
Bury	1–3	Oldham Athletic	17 August 1970
Charlton Athletic	3–0	Southend United	17 August 1970
Chester	2–1	Shrewsbury Town	19 August 1970
Colchester United	5–0	Cambridge United	19 August 1970
Crewe Alexandra	2–2	Tranmere Rovers	18 August 1970
Doncaster Rovers	1–1	Darlington	19 August 1970
Exeter City	0–0	Swansea City	17 August 1970
Fulham	1–0	Orient	19 August 1970
Gillingham	0–1	Luton Town	19 August 1970
Halifax Town	3–2	Bradford City	19 August 1970
Hartlepool	2–3	York City	19 August 1970
Lincoln City	2–1	Grimsby Town	19 August 1970
Mansfield Town	6–2	Chesterfield	19 August 1970
Newport County	2–1	Reading	19 August 1970
Port Vale	0–1	Walsall	17 August 1970
Portsmouth	2–0	Plymouth Argyle	19 August 1970
Rochdale	1–0	Southport	19 August 1970
Scunthorpe United	2–3	Northampton Town	19 August 1970
Stockport County	0–1	Preston North End	19 August 1970
Torquay United	1–1	Bournemouth & Boscombe Athletic	18 August 1970
Watford	2–0	Peterborough United	18 August 1970
Workington	2–0	Barrow	18 August 1970

=== Replays ===
Home team	Score	Away team	Date
Bournemouth & Boscombe Athletic	1–2	Torquay United	26 August 1970
Darlington	3–1	Doncaster Rovers	24 August 1970
Swansea City	4–2	Exeter City	25 August 1970
Tranmere Rovers	4–0	Crewe Alexandra	24 August 1970
Wrexham	2–3	Birmingham City	26 August 1970

== Second round ==
=== Ties ===
Home team	Score	Away team	Date
Aldershot	1–3	Manchester United	9 September 1970
Aston Villa	2–0	Burnley	9 September 1970
Blackpool	4–1	Newport County	9 September 1970
Bolton Wanderers	1–0	Blackburn Rovers	9 September 1970
Bristol Rovers	2–1	Newcastle United	8 September 1970
Carlisle United	2–1	Manchester City	9 September 1970
Colchester United	1–1	Birmingham City	9 September 1970
Crystal Palace	3–3	Rochdale	9 September 1970
Darlington	0–4	Fulham	9 September 1970
Derby County	3–1	Halifax Town	8 September 1970
Huddersfield Town	0–0	Nottingham Forest	9 September 1970
Ipswich Town	0–0	Arsenal	8 September 1970
Leicester City	3–2	Southampton	9 September 1970
Lincoln City	2–1	Sunderland	9 September 1970
Luton Town	3–0	Workington	8 September 1970
Mansfield Town	0–0	Liverpool	8 September 1970
Norwich City	0–0	Chester	9 September 1970
Oldham Athletic	2–4	Middlesbrough	8 September 1970
Oxford United	1–0	Wolverhampton Wanderers	9 September 1970
Portsmouth	1–0	Walsall	9 September 1970
Queens Park Rangers	4–0	Cardiff City	8 September 1970
Rotherham United	0–0	Bristol City	8 September 1970
Sheffield United	1–0	Leeds United	8 September 1970
Sheffield Wednesday	1–1	Chelsea	9 September 1970
Stoke City	0–0	Millwall	9 September 1970
Swindon Town	4–2	Watford	8 September 1970
Torquay United	1–3	Preston North End	9 September 1970
Tottenham Hotspur	3–0	Swansea City	9 September 1970
Tranmere Rovers	1–1	Coventry City	9 September 1970
West Bromwich Albion	3–1	Charlton Athletic	8 September 1970
West Ham United	1–0	Hull City	9 September 1970
York City	0–0	Northampton Town	9 September 1970

=== Replays ===
Home team	Score	Away team	Date
Arsenal	4–0	Ipswich Town	28 September 1970
Birmingham City	2–1	Colchester United	15 September 1970
Bristol City	4–0	Rotherham United	15 September 1970
Chelsea	2–1	Sheffield Wednesday	22 September 1970
Chester	1–2	Norwich City	16 September 1970
Coventry City	2–1	Tranmere Rovers	22 September 1970
Liverpool	3–2	Mansfield Town	22 September 1970
Millwall	2–1	Stoke City	21 September 1970
Northampton Town	1–1	York City	15 September 1970
Nottingham Forest	2–0	Huddersfield Town	21 September 1970
Rochdale	1–3	Crystal Palace	14 September 1970

=== Second Replay ===
Home team	Score	Away team	Date
York City	1–2	Northampton Town	28 September 1970

== Third round ==
=== Ties ===
Home team	Score	Away team	Date
Birmingham City	2–1	Nottingham Forest	6 October 1970
Blackpool	0–1	Bristol City	7 October 1970
Bolton Wanderers	1–1	Leicester City	7 October 1970
Carlisle United	3–1	Oxford United	6 October 1970
Chelsea	3–2	Middlesbrough	7 October 1970
Coventry City	3–1	West Ham United	6 October 1970
Crystal Palace	4–0	Lincoln City	7 October 1970
Derby County	4–2	Millwall	7 October 1970
Fulham	2–0	Queens Park Rangers	6 October 1970
Luton Town	0–1	Arsenal	6 October 1970
Manchester United	1–0	Portsmouth	7 October 1970
Northampton Town	1–1	Aston Villa	6 October 1970
Norwich City	1–1	Bristol Rovers	7 October 1970
Preston North End	0–1	West Bromwich Albion	6 October 1970
Swindon Town	2–0	Liverpool	6 October 1970
Tottenham Hotspur	2–1	Sheffield United	7 October 1970

=== Replays ===
Home team	Score	Away team	Date
Aston Villa	3–0	Northampton Town	13 October 1970
Bristol Rovers	3–1	Norwich City	13 October 1970
Leicester City	1–0	Bolton Wanderers	12 October 1970

== Fourth round ==
=== Ties ===
Home team	Score	Away team	Date
Aston Villa	1–0	Carlisle United	28 October 1970
Bristol Rovers	3–0	Birmingham City	27 October 1970
Coventry City	1–0	Derby County	27 October 1970
Crystal Palace	0–0	Arsenal	28 October 1970
Fulham	1–0	Swindon Town	27 October 1970
Leicester City	2–2	Bristol City	28 October 1970
Manchester United	2–1	Chelsea	28 October 1970
Tottenham Hotspur	5–0	West Bromwich Albion	28 October 1970

=== Replays ===
Home team	Score	Away team	Date
Bristol City	2–1	Leicester City	3 November 1970
Arsenal	0–2	Crystal Palace	9 November 1970

== Fifth Round ==
=== Ties ===
Home team	Score	Away team	Date
Bristol Rovers	1–1	Aston Villa	17 November 1970
Fulham	0–0	Bristol City	17 November 1970
Manchester United	4–2	Crystal Palace	18 November 1970
Tottenham Hotspur	4–1	Coventry City	18 November 1970

=== Replays ===
Home team	Score	Away team	Date
Aston Villa	1–0	Bristol Rovers	25 November 1970
Bristol City	1–0	Fulham	24 November 1970

== Semi-finals ==
=== First leg ===
Home team	Score	Away team	Date
Bristol City	1–1	Tottenham Hotspur	16 December 1970
Manchester United	1–1	Aston Villa	16 December 1970

=== Second leg ===
Home team	Score	Away team	Date	Agg
Aston Villa	2–1	Manchester United	23 December 1970	3–2
Tottenham Hotspur	2–0	Bristol City	23 December 1970	3–1

== Final ==
The final was held at Wembley Stadium, London on 27 February 1971.

27 February 1971
15:30

Tottenham Hotspur	2–0	Aston Villa
Chivers 78', 82'

Wembley Stadium, London
Attendance: 100,000
Referee: J. Finney

TOTTENHAM HOTSPUR:
1	Pat Jennings
2	Joe Kinnear
3	Cyril Knowles
4	Alan Mullery (c)
5	Peter Collins
6	Phil Beal
7	Alan Gilzean
8	Steve Perryman
9	Martin Chivers
10	Martin Peters
11	Jimmy Neighbour
Substitute:
12	Jimmy Pearce
Manager:
Bill Nicholson

ASTON VILLA:
1	John Dunn
2	Keith Bradley
3	Charlie Aitken
4	Brian Godfrey (c)
5	Fred Turnbull
6	Brian Tiler
7	Pat McMahon
8	Bruce Rioch
9	Andy Lochhead
10	Ian Hamilton
11	Willie Anderson
Substitute:
12	Dave Gibson
Manager:
Vic Crowe
