= Jimmy Brown (footballer, born 1953) =

Scottish footballer

Personal information
- Full name: James Keith Brown
- Date of birth: 3 October 1953 (age 73)
- Place of birth: Bothwell, Scotland
- Position: Midfielder

Youth career
- 1969: Aston Villa

Senior career*
Years	Team	Apps	(Gls)
1969–1975	Aston Villa	75	(1)
1975–1978	Preston North End	64	(3)
1978–1980	Ethnikos	23	(0)
1980	Portsmouth	5	(0)
1980–1981	Hibernian	15	(1)
1981–1982	Worcester City		
- * Club domestic league appearances and goals

James Keith Brown (born 3 October 1953) is a Scottish former footballer.

Brown attended Musselburgh Grammar School and was signed from Midlothian boys by English football club Aston Villa in May 1969 following a recommendation by scout Peter Doherty.

He was Aston Villa's youngest ever player to play in a first team game at 15 years 349 days, a record which still stands to this day, playing at left-back. He signed professional in 1970. He played in 75 League matches for Villa scoring 1 goal. He also played in 12 Cup games. Brown won the FA Youth Cup with Villa in 1972 before being sold to Preston North End in October 1975.

Brown left Preston in 1978, and signed for Greek club Ethnikos. He returned to English football two years later with Portsmouth, and ended his senior career after a season with Scottish club Hibernian.
