= Brian Tiler =

English footballer (1943–1990)

Personal information
- Date of birth: 15 March 1943
- Place of birth: Rotherham, England
- Date of death: 30 June 1990 (aged 47)
- Place of death: Latina, Italy
- Position: Central defender

Senior career*
Years	Team	Apps	(Gls)
1962–1968	Rotherham United	213	(27)
1968–1972	Aston Villa	107	(3)
1972–1974	Carlisle United	52	(1)
1974–1976	Wigan Athletic	11	(0)
1976	Portland Timbers	6	(0)
Total		389	(31)

Managerial career
- 1974–1976: Wigan Athletic
- 1977: Portland Timbers
- 1978–1980: Zambia
- 1980: Miami Americans
- * Club domestic league appearances and goals

Brian Tiler (15 March 1943 – 30 June 1990) was an English footballer who played as a central defender.

== Career ==
Tiler began his career at his home town club Rotherham United where he made his debut in 1962–63. He spent seven seasons at Millmoor, playing more than two hundred league games, latterly under manager Tommy Docherty. Docherty was subsequently appointed manager at Queens Park Rangers, only to leave 29 days later after arguing with the club chairman over transfer policy. Docherty had wished to sign Tiler to his new team but Rangers' chairman, John Gregory, baulked at Rotherham's £100,000 asking price prompting his manager to walk-out on the club.

Tyler was Docherty's first signing at Aston Villa in December 1968. The new Villa chairman, Doug Ellis managed to half the asking price and Tiler was installed as club captain in a team that had long since lost its way. He scored on his debut, a 2–0 home victory against Cardiff City that Boxing Day. Despite this, Tiler had the misfortune of being a member of the side that were relegated to the Third Division for the first and only time in the club's history in 1969–70. However, he was also a member of the Villa side that won promotion two years later. In October 1972, he was transferred to Carlisle United, where he finished his Football League career.

In 1974, he was appointed player-manager of non league Wigan Athletic, where he spent two years, and won the Northern Premier League in 1974–75. He played eleven league games for Wigan before leaving the club in 1976. He would later return to Springfield Park as the coach of the Zambia national team, who Wigan played a friendly against in October 1978.

He then moved to America to join the Portland Timbers, originally as a player before joining the coaching staff. In 1980, he became assistant manager to Ron Newman at the Miami Americans in the franchise's only year of existence. After nine games, Newman quit to take over as coach at the San Diego Sockers, and Brian Tiler stepped up to become Head Coach until the team's demise at the end of the season.

Tiler later became managing director at AFC Bournemouth, where he helped engineer Bournemouth's first ever promotion to the Second Division in 1986–87 along with his friend, team manager Harry Redknapp.

== Death ==
In June 1990, Tiler was killed in a road accident in Italy, when a car collided head on with the minibus in which Tiler and Redknapp were travelling. Redknapp was also badly injured in the accident, but survived and went on to make a full recovery. The pair were in Italy watching that summer's World Cup.

== Honours ==
Aston Villa

- Football League Cup runner-up: 1970–71
