= John Dunn (footballer, born 1944) =

English footballer

Personal information
- Full name: John Alfred Dunn
- Date of birth: 21 June 1944 (age 82)
- Place of birth: Barking, England
- Position: Goalkeeper

Youth career
- Chelsea

Senior career*
Years	Team	Apps	(Gls)
1962–1966	Chelsea	13	(0)
1966–1968	Torquay United	44	(0)
1968–1971	Aston Villa	101	(0)
1971–1975	Charlton Athletic	104	(0)
- Tooting & Mitcham United
1988–1989	Ford United		
Total		262	(0)
- * Club domestic league appearances and goals

John Alfred Dunn (born 21 June 1944) is an English footballer who played as a goalkeeper in the Football League.

Dunn signed professional forms for Chelsea in January 1962, from the Juniors. A sound and reliable goalkeeper, he spent four years as understudy to Peter Bonetti, before being sold to Torquay United by Chelsea manager, Tommy Docherty for £2,000.

Dunn was playing at Torquay but lost his first-team place to Andy Donnelly in October 1967, switching to Western Football League.

In January 1968, Villa manager Tommy Cummings brought the 23-year-old to Villa Park for £8,000. Dunn made 55 first-team appearances for Third Division Aston Villa in the 1970-71 season before being given a free transfer in the Club's retained list. Villa had previously bought Tommy Hughes from Chelsea for £12,500.

== Honours ==
Aston Villa

- Football League Cup runner-up: 1970–71
