= Tommy Cummings =

English footballer and manager

Personal information
- Full name: Thomas Smith Cummings
- Date of birth: 12 September 1928
- Place of birth: Sunderland, County Durham, England
- Date of death: 12 July 2009 (aged 80)
- Place of death: Blackburn, Lancashire, England
- Position: Central defender

Senior career*
Years	Team	Apps	(Gls)
1947–1963	Burnley	434	(3)
1963–1964	Mansfield Town	10	(0)

Managerial career
- 1963–1967: Mansfield Town
- 1967–1968: Aston Villa
- * Club domestic league appearances and goals

Thomas Smith Cummings (12 September 1928 – 12 July 2009) was an English football player and manager. In 1961 he was elected chairman of the Professional Footballers' Association following the resignation of Jimmy Hill.

Cummings was born in Sunderland, County Durham and started his football career at Hylton Colliery Juniors. Such was his quality as a centre-half he was invited to Strasbourg in 1947 to represent Great Britain in a junior international tournament. In the same year he signed a professional contract with Burnley, also opting to continue his apprenticeship as a mining engineer. He would also play for England B three times.

Cummings made his league debut for Burnley in December 1948. He played in the 1959–60 championship winning season and in the 1962 FA Cup final, and in all made 479 appearances for the Clarets, standing fifth in their all-time list of Football League appearances with 434. He played his last game for the club nearly 14 years after making his debut. He scored three goals for the club, the most notable of which came in a 2–1 win against Newcastle United in January 1952. He dispossessed Newcastle's Jackie Milburn near Burnley's penalty area, dribbled past most of the Newcastle team in a 75 yards (69 m) run, and scored with a 18 yards (16 m) shot on a show-covered pitch.

In March 1963 he was appointed player-manager of Mansfield Town leading them to promotion from Division Four at the end of the season.

The 38-year-old Cummings was appointed Aston Villa manager in the summer of 1967, reportedly on a three-year contract at £5,000 per year. His predecessor Dick Taylor had made heavy investment in new players had failed disastrously, resulting in Villa being relegated to the Second Division and plunging the club deep into financial trouble. According to Charlie Aitken, Cummings did little to prevent Villa's slide down the tables. He was a drinker and the players had little respect for him. Tommy Cummings was sacked in November 1968, with Villa lying at the bottom of Division Two.

After retiring from football he went on to becoming a licensee and ran pubs in and around Burnley, including the Shooters Arms in Nelson.

== Honours ==
Burnley

- Football League First Division: 1959–60
- FA Cup runner-up: 1961–62
