= Dick Edwards (footballer) =

English footballer (1942–2025)

Personal information
- Full name: Richard Thomas Edwards
- Date of birth: 29 November 1942
- Place of birth: Kirkby in Ashfield, Nottinghamshire, England
- Date of death: 16 June 2025 (aged 82)
- Height: 6 ft 1 in (1.85 m)
- Position: Central defender

Youth career
- 1956: Nottingham Forest
- 1957–1959: Notts County

Senior career*
Years	Team	Apps	(Gls)
1959–1966	Notts County	245	(21)
1967–1968	Mansfield Town	34	(1)
1968–1970	Aston Villa	68	(3)
1970–1973	Torquay United	113	(7)
1973–1974	Mansfield Town	33	(1)
1974–1976	Bath City	103	(14)
Total		606	(41)
- * Club domestic league appearances and goals

Richard Thomas Edwards (20 November 1942 – 16 June 2025) was an English professional footballer who played as a central defender for numerous clubs, including Aston Villa, Mansfield Town, Torquay United, and Notts County.

Edwards was signed as the replacement for John Sleeuwenhoek the master of the sliding tackle.He commenced at right back but later under Tommy Doherty he switched to centre-half to partner Brian Tiler.

Edwards was also a country musician who released several singles and albums, including "Torquay United's War Cry" while a player for that club in 1972.

Edwards died on 16 June 2025, at the age of 82.

== Sources ==
- Notts County Former Players' Association (Benevolent Fund)
- 7" discography
