= Pat McMahon (footballer, born 1945) =

Scottish footballer

Personal information
- Full name: Patrick McMahon
- Date of birth: 19 September 1945 (age 81)
- Place of birth: Croy, North Lanarkshire, Scotland
- Position: Midfielder

Youth career
- ????–1967: Kilsyth Rangers

Senior career*
Years	Team	Apps	(Gls)
1967–1969	Celtic	3	(2)
1969–1975	Aston Villa	130	(25)
1976–1977	Portland Timbers	41	(2)
1978	Colorado Caribous	25	(0)
1979–1980	Atlanta Chiefs	34	(0)
1979–1980	Atlanta Chiefs (indoor)	11	(1)
1982	Portland Timbers	0	(0)
- * Club domestic league appearances and goals

Patrick McMahon (born 19 September 1945) is a Scottish former footballer who is best known for the time he spent with Aston Villa and Celtic.

== Career ==
=== Kilsyth Rangers ===
McMahon began his football career at local Scottish team Kilsyth Rangers. He moved to London, working for the GPO. In April 1967, Kilsyth Rangers sent him a telegram asking him to play for them in the Scottish Junior Cup final as last minute replacement for an injured player. He performed splendidly, and they won the cup.

=== Celtic ===
While with Kilsyth Rangers, he wrote to Celtic, asking for trials. Celtic responded promptly and signed him. He spent only two seasons at Celtic Park, and could only manage three league match outings, resulting in two goals.

=== Aston Villa ===
In July 1969, Aston Villa manager Tommy Docherty signed him on a free transfer, pipping Dunfermline for his signature. McMahon was in Aston Villa's 1971 Football League Cup final team and gained a Third Division Championship medal in 1972.

=== NASL ===
He left Villa in March 1976 to join goalkeeper teammate Jimmy Cumbes in the North American Soccer League. In the NASL he played for the Portland Timbers, Colorado Caribous and Atlanta Chiefs. He also played one season of indoor with Atlanta. He returned for a final season with Portland in 1982 but did not appear in any matches.

McMahon still works in USA in the aluminum industry.

== Honours ==
Aston Villa

- Football League Cup runner-up: 1970–71
