= Willie Anderson (footballer) =

English footballer (born 1947)

Personal information
- Full name: William John Anderson
- Date of birth: 24 January 1947 (age 79)
- Place of birth: Liverpool, England
- Height: 5 ft 8 in (1.73 m)
- Position: Winger

Youth career
- 1962–1964: Manchester United

Senior career*
Years	Team	Apps	(Gls)
1963–1967	Manchester United	9	(0)
1967–1973	Aston Villa	231	(36)
1973–1977	Cardiff City	126	(12)
1975	→ Portland Timbers (loan)	17	(3)
1977–1982	Portland Timbers	160	(13)
1979–1980	Wichita Wings (indoor)	18	(15)
1980–1982	Portland Timbers (indoor)	31	(17)
- * Club domestic league appearances and goals

William John Anderson (born 24 January 1947) is an English former professional footballer who played as a winger. During his career, he made over 350 appearances in the Football League.

He began his career as a youth player with Manchester United, making his professional debut at the age of sixteen. However, he struggled to establish himself in the first team, largely due to the emergence of George Best in his position, and was sold to Aston Villa in January 1967 for £20,000. Relegated in his first season, he later helped the club win promotion back to the First Division and made over 200 appearances in all competitions before joining Cardiff City in 1973.

With Cardiff, he won promoted to the Second Division and reached three Welsh Cup finals, winning two in 1973 and 1974. During the English summer break in 1975, he joined Portland Timbers in the North American Soccer League on loan and enjoyed the experience enough to return to the club on a permanent basis in 1977. He went on to make over 150 appearances for the side, spending a season on loan with indoor side Wichita Wings, before retiring.

== Early life ==
Anderson was born in Liverpool and was raised as a Protestant. His father worked as a porter in a fruit and vegetable market.

== Career ==
=== Manchester United ===
Anderson was a boyhood fan of his hometown side Liverpool and had dreamt of playing for the club. He had regularly trained under Alan A'Court for his school side and had been set to join the club before impressing scouts from Manchester United while representing Lancashire schoolboys. After being approached by representatives from United, he decided to join the club after fearing that Liverpool would not sign him, joining the club's youth system at the age of fifteen. In later years, Anderson would meet Liverpool manager Bill Shankly who confirmed that the club would have made an approach to sign him if he had rejected United.

One of a group of around twenty players in his age group, he was one of just three who went on to sign professional contracts with United at the age of eighteen, alongside George Best and John Fitzpatrick. Anderson later commented on the jump in quality after joining the club, stating "I was the best soccer player around where I grew up, but when I joined United they were all as good as me and most of them better. That was something of a shock to my system." Anderson had been considered one of the brightest prospects at the club but, the arrival of Best, led to him falling down the pecking order.

Of the three youth players, Anderson was the youngest to make his debut, starting in the First Division at the age of sixteen in a 5–1 victory over Burnley on 28 December 1963. He made two further appearances during the 1963–64 season, defeats to Southampton and West Ham United in the FA Cup third round and the league respectively. He later became the first ever substitute used by the club when he replaced Best against Liverpool in the 1965 FA Charity Shield at the start of the following season. However, he struggled to break into the first team and gradually fell out of favour, making five appearances during the 1965–66 season followed by a single appearance the year after, as a substitute during a 2–2 draw with Liverpool in his final match for the club. Commenting on his lack of playing time, he stated "I got a couple of runs at it, but I soon realised I was never going to make it there."

Although manager Matt Busby offered Anderson the chance to remain with the club, he decided to leave in order to find first team football and was allowed to join Aston Villa for a fee of £20,000 in January 1967 at the age of nineteen. Anderson later reminisced over his departure, stating "They always moved you on when you got to nineteen or twenty, because there were so many talented young kids coming up behind you."

=== Aston Villa ===
In his first season with Villa, the club suffered relegation to the Second Division. The club later suffered another relegation, falling into the Third Division in 1971. He helped the side win promotion during the 1971–72 season, scoring a career high fifteen goals in all competitions with eight coming from penalties, helping him gain a reputation as a penalty taker specialist.

=== Cardiff City ===
Having been virtually ever present for Villa over six years, he was allowed to join Cardiff City. Cardiff had failed in attempt to sign him in 1971 but finally managed to agree a deal for him in February 1973 at a transfer fee of £60,000. He made his debut on 27 February 1973 in a 3–0 defeat to Swindon Town and played in all fourteen of the club's remaining league fixtures in the 1972–73 season as they narrowly avoided relegation to the Third Division. He also played in both legs of the Welsh Cup final against Bangor City, as Cardiff won 5–1 on aggregate.

The following season, he scored his first goal for the club, during a 4–2 defeat to Oxford United. After sharing playing duties with Peter King and Tony Villars during the first half of the 1973–74 season, before becoming first choice and missing only one league match after December. He also helped the side to a second consecutive Welsh Cup victory after defeating Stourbridge 2–0 on aggregate.

In his third season, Anderson played a prominent role in a struggling side, appearing in 37 league matches as the club suffered relegation to the Third Division after finishing in 21st place. Despite their relegation, Anderson reached his third consecutive Welsh Cup final, but suffered a 5–1 aggregate defeat to Wrexham.

Anderson regained top form for the Bluebirds in the Third Division promotion season of 1975–76, for which he retains legendary status amongst a new generation of Cardiff City fans. Playing on the left wing and with a remarkably deep, left-footed cross, he fed a dynamic partnership of Adrian Alston and Tony Evans, that fired Cardiff to second place and promotion to the Second Division at the first attempt. The Bluebirds attracted large attendances in this campaign, including a crowd of over 35,000 against Hereford United in a 2–0 win in the penultimate game of the season, in which Anderson played a key part.

Anderson saw out the following campaign back in Division 2, the highlight was a remarkable left foot strike at home in an early 3–2 win against Bolton Wanderes on 9 October 1976, coming from 2–0 down. The Bluebirds, failing to capitalise on the momentum of the promotion campaign and following loan spells, sold him to Portland Timbers in 1977.

=== Portland Timbers ===
In 1977, he decided to leave Cardiff to sign for the Portland Timbers in the North American Soccer League on loan. Anderson became aware of the side after meeting with former teammate Brian Godfrey who had recently joined Portland. The team was managed by Anderson's former Aston Villa boss Vic Crowe and, after learning of Anderson's interest, Crowe contacted the winger who agreed to join despite not knowing the team's full name or where in the country they were based. He arrived after the start of the season after Cardiff reached the final of the Welsh Cup and, despite suffering jetlag after travelling to America two days earlier, he made his debut in a 2–0 victory over Vancouver Whitecaps. In his following match, he scored his first goal for the club, netting the game-winning goal in overtime against Rochester Lancers. The club were sponsored by an American alcohol company named Blitz who included a 24 pack of beer each week with each player's wages. Forming an effective wing partnership with Jimmy Kelly, he helped the team achieve a 16–6 record, winning the Western Conference before suffering defeat to Tampa Bay Rowdies in the pre-season final.

He returned to Cardiff after his four-month loan spell ended, arriving late after staying in to compete in the playoffs. Although Anderson wished to return to Portland, Cardiff were disgruntled by his late return and refused to release him from his contract. In 1977, Portland returned to sign Anderson on a permanent basis. He remained with the Timbers through the 1982 season, with one indoor season on loan with the Wichita Wings of the Major Indoor Soccer League. He left the club in 1982 when it was forced to fold. At the time of his departure, he was the club's all-time record appearance holder and second in its all time assist rankings, falling two short of former teammate John Bain.

== Later life ==
Following his retirement from playing, Anderson worked as an advertising salesman for classical music radio station KKSN. He later worked as an accounts executive at another radio station, KQAC, and coached the girl's varsity team at Riverdale High School. Anderson later became a sports analyst for KPTV, covering Portland Timbers matches.

== Career statistics ==
Appearances and goals by club, season and competition
Club	Season	League			Domestic Cup		League Cup		Other (Note: Includes appearances in other competitive competitions, including the FA Charity Shield, Welsh Cup and UEFA Cup Winners' Cup)		Total	
Club	Season	Division	Apps	Goals	Apps	Goals	Apps	Goals	Apps	Goals	Apps	Goals
Manchester United	1963–64	First Division	2	0	1	0	0	0	0	0	3	0
Manchester United	1964–65	First Division	6	0	1	0	0	0	2	0	9	0
Manchester United	1965–66	First Division	1	0	0	0	0	0	0	0	1	0
Manchester United	Manchester United total		9	0	2	0	0	0	2	0	13	0
Aston Villa	1966–67	First Division	17	5	1	0	0	0	0	0	18	5
Aston Villa	1967–68	Second Division	42	5	2	1	1	0	0	0	45	6
Aston Villa	1968–69	Second Division	38	6	4	0	1	0	0	0	43	6
Aston Villa	1969–70	Second Division	38	5	2	0	2	0	0	0	42	5
Aston Villa	1970–71	Third Division	42	4	1	0	10	2	0	0	53	6
Aston Villa	1971–72	Third Division	40	10	1	0	7	5	0	0	49	15
Aston Villa	1972–73	Second Division	14	1	1	0	2	0	0	0	17	1
Aston Villa	Aston Villa total		231	36	12	1	23	7	0	0	266	44
Cardiff City	1972–73	Second Division	15	0	0	0	0	0	3	0	18	0
Cardiff City	1973–74	Second Division	29	3	1	0	1	0	1	0	32	3
Cardiff City	1974–75	Second Division	37	3	1	0	1	0	7	0	46	3
Cardiff City	1975–76	Third Division	29	6	4	0	0	0	2	0	35	6
Cardiff City	1976–77	Second Division	16	0	0	0	3	0	5	0	24	0
Cardiff City	Cardiff City total		126	12	6	0	5	0	18	0	155	12
Portland Timbers (loan)	1975	NASL	17	3	—		—		—		17	3
Portland Timbers	1977	NASL	19	1	—		—		—		19	1
Portland Timbers	1978	NASL	26	3	—		—		—		26	3
Portland Timbers	1979	NASL	25	0	—		—		—		25	0
Portland Timbers	1980	NASL	24	2	—		—		—		24	2
Portland Timbers	1981	NASL	27	2	—		—		—		27	2
Portland Timbers	1982	NASL	21	2	—		—		—		21	2
Portland Timbers	Portland Timbers total		159	13	0	0	0	0	0	0	159	13
Total			525	61	20	1	28	7	20	0	593	69

== Honours ==
Manchester United

- FA Charity Shield: 1965 (shared)

Aston Villa

- Football League Third Division: 1971–72
- Football League Cup runner-up: 1970–71

Cardiff City

- Football League Third Division runner-up: 1975–76
- Welsh Cup: 1972–73, 1973–74; runner-up: 1974–75

Portland Timbers

- North American Soccer League runner-up: 1975
