= Ian Hamilton (footballer, born 1950) =

English footballer (1950–2024)

Personal information
- Full name: Ian Michael Hamilton
- Date of birth: 31 October 1950
- Place of birth: Streatham, London, England
- Date of death: 19 May 2024 (aged 73)
- Position: Midfielder

Youth career
- Chelsea

Senior career*
Years	Team	Apps	(Gls)
1966–1968	Chelsea	5	(2)
1968–1969	Southend United	36	(11)
1969–1976	Aston Villa	208	(40)
1976–1978	Sheffield United	60	(13)
1978–1981	Minnesota Kicks	101	(22)
1979–1981	Minnesota Kicks (indoor)	25	(19)
1982	San Jose Earthquakes	18	(1)
Total		453	(108)
- * Club domestic league appearances and goals

Ian “Chico” Michael Hamilton (31 October 1950 – 19 May 2024) was an English professional footballer who played as a midfielder. Hamilton made more than 300 appearances in the Football League playing for Chelsea, Southend United, Aston Villa and Sheffield United, and more than 100 in the North American Soccer League for the Minnesota Kicks and the San Jose Earthquakes. He is the youngest ever Chelsea men’s team player and goalscorer. He was nicknamed Chico after the jazz drummer Chico Hamilton.

== Career ==
Hamilton joined Chelsea as a junior and became the Stamford Bridge club's youngest ever player and goalscorer at 16 years, 138 days when he scored against Tottenham Hotspur on his debut, on 18 March 1967, a feat which earned comparisons with another famous Chelsea striker who also scored on his debut against Spurs – Jimmy Greaves. Thereafter he played only four more first-team games for Chelsea, spending the 1968–69 season with Southend United before moving to Aston Villa in 1969.

At Villa he carved out a long career as a midfielder, helping the club win the Third Division title in 1972, and playing in two League Cup finals – they lost in 1971 and won in 1975. After two seasons with Sheffield United, Hamilton became one of many British footballers who ended their careers in the North American Soccer League, where he played for Minnesota Kicks and San Jose Earthquakes.

After he finished his professional career, he spent 17 years as boys' soccer coach at Thomas Worthington High School, in Worthington, Ohio, returning after a seven-year gap to coach girls' soccer.

== Death ==
Hamilton died in May 2024, at the age of 73.

== Honours ==
Aston Villa

- Football League Cup: 1974–75;runner-up: 1970–71
