= Keith Bradley (footballer) =

English footballer (born 1946)

Personal information
- Date of birth: 31 January 1946 (age 80)
- Place of birth: Ellesmere Port, Cheshire, England
- Height: 5 ft 9 1/2 in (1.77 m)
- Position: Right-back

Youth career
- 1962–1964: Everton

Senior career*
Years	Team	Apps	(Gls)
1964–1972	Aston Villa	122	(2)
1972–1976	Peterborough United	109	(1)
- * Club domestic league appearances and goals

Keith Bradley (born 31 January 1946) is an English former footballer who is best known for the time he spent with Aston Villa.

== Career ==
Bradley joined Everton as a youth player at the age of 16. After being spotted and approached by Joe Mercer, he signed a professional contract at the age of 18 and spent ten years at the Villa, reaching the League Cup final and playing at Wembley in the 1971–72 season. After leaving Aston Villa, he enjoyed four years playing for Peterborough United until retiring from playing. He then coached the Birmingham City youth team under manager Ron Saunders until 1986. Following his retirement, he owned and managed the bar Badgers in Mojácar for 24 years and was also active in the town's political scene.

== Honours ==
Aston Villa

- Football League Cup runner-up: 1970–71
