= Andy Lochhead =

Scottish footballer (1941–2022)

Personal information
- Full name: Andrew Lorimar Lochhead
- Date of birth: 9 March 1941
- Place of birth: Milngavie, Stirlingshire, Scotland
- Date of death: 18 March 2022 (aged 81)
- Height: 5 ft 11 1/2 in (1.82 m)
- Position: Forward

Senior career*
Years	Team	Apps	(Gls)
1960–1968	Burnley	226	(101)
1968–1970	Leicester City	44	(12)
1970–1973	Aston Villa	131	(34)
1973–1975	Oldham Athletic	45	(10)
1974	Denver Dynamos	20	(2)
Total		466	(159)

International career
1962	Scotland U23	1	(0)
- * Club domestic league appearances and goals

Andrew Lorimar Lochhead (9 March 1941 – 18 March 2022) was a Scottish professional footballer who played as a forward.

== Career ==
Lochhead was born in Milngavie, Stirlingshire, Scotland. He started his career at Burnley and made his first team debut in 1960. He remains the only player to have scored five goals for the Clarets on two occasions. On 26 December 1963, he scored four goals in a 6–1 win over Manchester United at Turf Moor.

In 1968, he was sold to Leicester City and appeared in their 1969 FA Cup final 1–0 defeat against Manchester City.

He was sold to Aston Villa after the final and played in the 1971 Football League Cup final for Villa. In 1972 following his contribution to the Villa's promotion to Division 2 (19 goals) he was voted the midlands footballer of the year in a write-in poll conducted by the Birmingham Evening Mail newspaper. In 1973, he was sold to Oldham Athletic. He had a brief spell in America with Denver Dynamos before retiring.

== Honours ==
Leicester City

- FA Cup runner-up: 1968–69

Aston Villa

- Football League Third Division: 1971–72
- Football League Cup runner-up: 1970–71

Oldham Athletic

- Football League Third Division: 1973–74
