= Bruce Rioch =

Scotland international footballer and manager

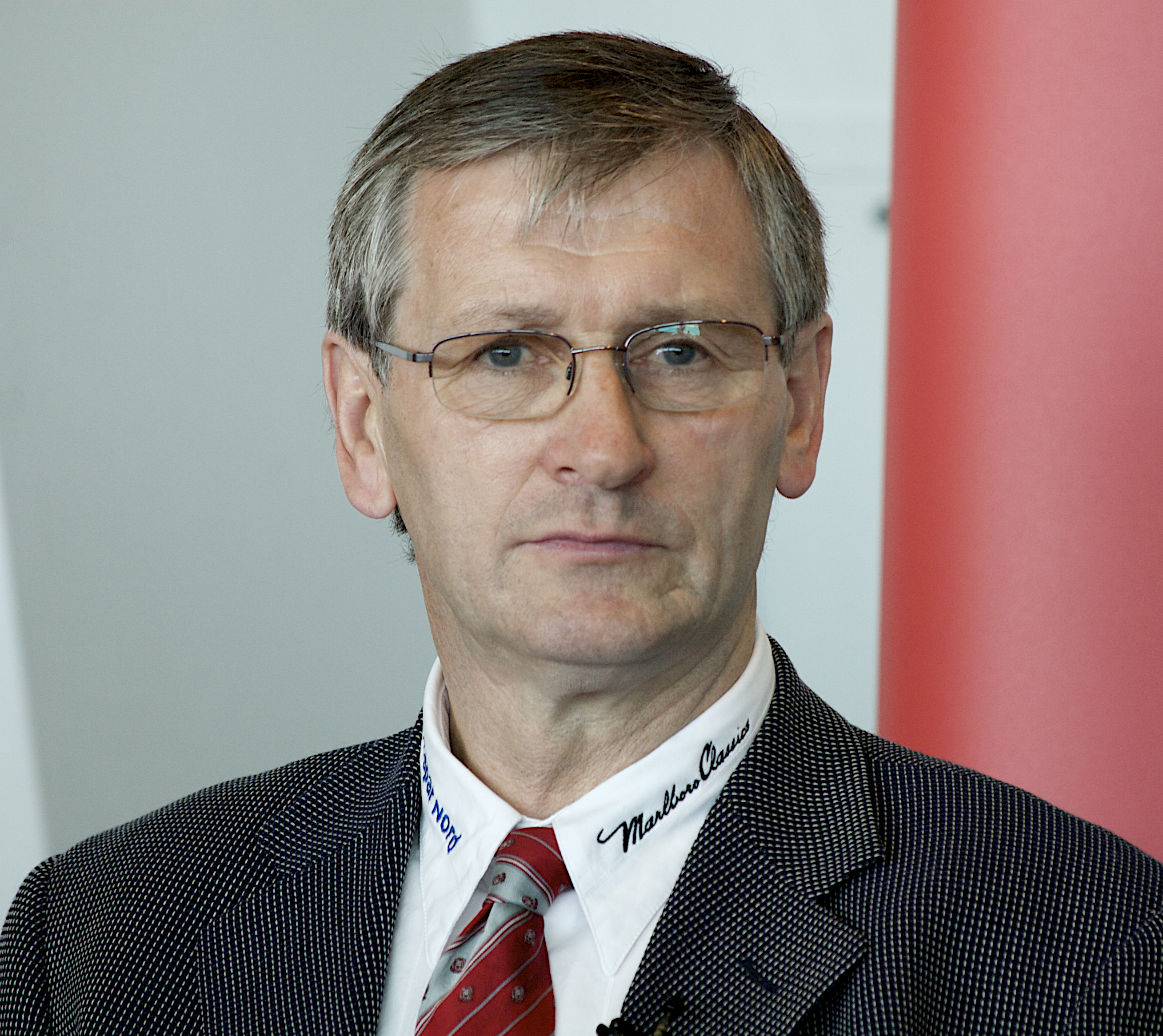
- Rioch in 2008

Personal information
- Full name: Bruce David Rioch
- Date of birth: 6 September 1947 (age 79)
- Place of birth: Aldershot, England
- Height: 5 ft 11 in (1.81 m)
- Position: Midfielder

Senior career*
Years	Team	Apps	(Gls)
1964–1969	Luton Town	149	(47)
1969–1974	Aston Villa	154	(34)
1974–1976	Derby County	106	(34)
1976–1977	Everton	30	(3)
1977–1979	Derby County	41	(4)
1978	→ Birmingham City (loan)	3	(0)
1979	→ Sheffield United (loan)	8	(1)
1980–1981	Seattle Sounders	46	(4)
1981–1984	Torquay United	71	(6)
Total		608	(133)

International career
1975–1978	Scotland	24	(6)

Managerial career
- 1982–1984: Torquay United
- 1985: Seattle Storm
- 1986–1990: Middlesbrough
- 1990–1992: Millwall
- 1992–1995: Bolton Wanderers
- 1995–1996: Arsenal
- 1998–2000: Norwich City
- 2000–2001: Wigan Athletic
- 2005–2007: OB
- 2008: AaB
- * Club domestic league appearances and goals

Bruce David Rioch (/ˈriːɒk/; born 6 September 1947) is a British football manager and former player for the Scotland national team. His last managerial post was at AaB in the Danish Superliga in 2008.

As a player, he made more than 550 appearances in the Football League and became Aston Villa's record signing in 1969. By virtue of his parents' birthplaces, Rioch represented Scotland in 24 matches; he became the first player born in England to captain Scotland. As a manager, he has taken charge of clubs in England, including Arsenal, where he signed Dennis Bergkamp, and in the United States, and Denmark. His brother Neil, son Gregor and nephew Matty Holmes were also professional footballers.

== Playing career ==
Rioch was born in Aldershot, Hampshire: his father served there with the Scots Guards, eventually becoming a sergeant major. His father had been born in Kinneff, Aberdeenshire, and his mother in Skye, each qualifying him to play for Scotland. After moving to Luton, Bedfordshire, at the age of 14, he joined his local side, Luton Town, turning professional in September 1964. He made his first team debut later that month, and his league debut in November 1964 in a 1–0 defeat at home to Southend United. He spent a couple of years establishing himself and was a regular member of the Luton team, scoring 24 goals, that won the Fourth Division title in 1968.

Rioch moved to Aston Villa in July 1969 for a fee of £100,000, then a record fee paid by a Second Division side. He won a League Cup runners up medal in 1971, Villa losing 2–0 to Tottenham Hotspur.

He moved to Derby County in February 1974, winning a League Championship medal. He joined Everton in December 1976, but returned to Derby County in November 1977. After a dispute with the Derby manager, Tommy Docherty, Rioch had brief loan spells with Birmingham City in December 1978 and with Sheffield United in March 1979. He then left the Baseball Ground to play for NASL side Seattle Sounders. While playing with Seattle Sounders in 1980 he was named to the NASL First Team All-Stars. He returned to England in October 1980 when he joined Torquay United as player-coach, working at first under Mike Green and then under Frank O'Farrell.

== Managerial career ==
=== Torquay United ===
In July 1982, Rioch became player-manager of Torquay United, but left in January 1984. In February 1985, after 13 months out of the game he was appointed manager of FC Seattle, of the US Western Soccer Alliance, but resigned in September 1985 to return to England.

=== Middlesbrough ===
He was appointed as manager of Middlesbrough in February 1986 and his first success in management came in 1987 when he guided Middlesbrough to runners-up spot in the Third Division and promotion to the Second Division at the end of a season which had started with them locked out of Ayresome Park by the official receiver and on the verge of bankruptcy. A year later they won a second successive promotion, this time as winners of the Second Division promotion/First Division relegation playoffs. Middlesbrough were relegated on the final day of the 1988–89 season (despite having not occupied a relegation place prior to that). He was dismissed the following March as the Teessiders hovered just above the Second Division drop zone but on the brink of their first ever Wembley final in the Zenith Data Systems Cup.

=== Millwall ===
Rioch made a swift return to management the following month with Millwall and guided them to a playoff place in the 1990–91 Second Division campaign, but left in March 1992.

=== Bolton Wanderers ===
Rioch was appointed manager of Bolton Wanderers in May 1992. In his first season they defeated FA Cup holders Liverpool 2–0 at Anfield in an FA Cup replay. Bolton finished runners-up in Division Two and won promotion to Division One. The following year Bolton finished in a respectable mid-table position as well as defeating Premier League opponents Arsenal, Everton and Aston Villa in the FA Cup. In the 1994–95 season Bolton were losing finalists in the League Cup to Liverpool. In the same season Bolton defeated Reading 4–3 in extra time in the Division One playoff final after being 2–0 down at half time.

The playoff final victory was Rioch's last game as Bolton manager. A few weeks later he accepted the Arsenal manager's job and was replaced at Bolton by Roy McFarland.

=== Arsenal ===
In 1995–96, his only season at Arsenal, Rioch guided Arsenal to a UEFA Cup place, finishing fifth in the Premiership. It was achieved on the last day of the season, at the expense of Everton, Blackburn Rovers and Tottenham Hotspur. Arsenal also reached the League Cup semi-finals, but lost on away goals to Aston Villa, and were knocked out of the FA Cup in the third round by First Division side Sheffield United.

Rioch was known for his intensive training methods, according to former Arsenal player Adrian Clarke. Just before the start of the 1996–97 season, Rioch was dismissed, after a dispute with the club's board of directors over transfer funds.

=== Queens Park Rangers ===
After leaving Arsenal, Rioch worked as assistant manager under Stewart Houston (his former assistant at Arsenal) at Queens Park Rangers, but was dismissed along with Houston after just over a year at Loftus Road.

=== Norwich City ===
In May 1998, Rioch was appointed manager of Norwich City in Division One. He resigned after less than two seasons at the helm. He cited a perceived lack of ambition at the club as the main reason for his decision to resign (he correctly predicted that the club's star player Craig Bellamy would inevitably be sold), however he also acknowledged that the club's uncertain financial position meant that the transfer funds available to him were limited.

=== Wigan Athletic ===
Rioch made a swift return to management with Wigan Athletic for the 2000–01 season. He won the Manager of the Month award for November 2000, but left the club the following February, as they occupied the Division Two play-off zone.

=== Odense Boldklub (OB) ===
Rioch was intent on returning from management, and was linked with the Derby County manager's job after John Gregory was dismissed at the end of the 2002–03 season. But it was four years before Rioch made his return to management. He was appointed as head coach of Danish Superliga side OB in June 2005. He led OB to a third place in his first season in charge, but decided to leave the club on 12 March 2007 due to his wife's illness, as the official explanation. The media, however, reported that the actual cause was a dispute between Rioch and the management of OB.

=== Aalborg BK (AaB) ===
In June 2008, Rioch returned to management with Danish champions AaB after former head coach Erik Hamrén moved to Rosenborg BK. His first priority was to try to qualify AaB for the Champions League which they entered in the second qualifying round. He guided them into the group stage after defeating FK Modriča and FBK Kaunas. By beating Celtic, AaB came third and thus entered the UEFA Cup. Rioch, however, did not witness this victory from the bench: On 23 October 2008 he was dismissed as AaB had only two victories from ten games and were second from bottom of the Danish league.

=== Later career ===
In November 2009, Rioch was linked with a return to football as manager of the Scotland national team, this following the departure of George Burley. In March 2010, he took training sessions at Cornish non-League club Falmouth Town, near his home. He later became involved with coaching at another Cornish club, Penryn Athletic of the South West Peninsula League.

== Career statistics ==
=== International ===
Appearances and goals by national team and year
National team	Year	Apps	Goals
Scotland	1975	8	4
Scotland	1976	6	2
Scotland	1977	6	0
Scotland	1978	4	0
Total		24	6

Scores and results list Scotland's goal tally first, score column indicates score after each Rioch goal.

List of international goals scored by Bruce Rioch
No.	Date	Venue	Opponent	Score	Result	Competition	Ref.
1	17 May 1975	Ninian Park, Cardiff, Wales	Wales	2–2	2–2	1974–75 British Home Championship	
2	24 May 1975	Wembley Stadium, London, England	England	1–2	1–5	1974–75 British Home Championship	
3	29 October 1975	Hampden Park, Glasgow, Scotland	Denmark	2–1	3–1	UEFA Euro 1976 qualification	
4	17 December 1975	Hampden Park, Glasgow, Scotland	Romania	1–0	1–1	UEFA Euro 1976 qualification	
5	6 May 1976	Hampden Park, Glasgow, Scotland	Wales	2–0	3–1	1975–76 British Home Championship	
6	8 September 1976	Hampden Park, Glasgow, Scotland	Finland	1–0	6–0	Friendly	

=== Managerial ===
Team	Nat	From	To	Record				
Team	Nat	From	To	G	W	D	L	Win %
Torquay United	(England)	1 July 1982	14 January 1984	78	28	17	33	35.9
Seattle Storm	(United States)	February 1985	February 1986	13	6	1	6	46.15
Middlesbrough	(England)	2 February 1986	9 March 1990	205	82	52	71	40
Millwall	(England)	1 April 1990	17 March 1992	100	36	24	40	36
Bolton Wanderers	(England)	29 May 1992	8 June 1995	172	83	42	47	48.26
Arsenal	(England)	8 June 1995	12 August 1996	47	22	15	10	46.81
Norwich City	(England)	1 July 1998	13 March 2000	93	30	31	32	32.26
Wigan Athletic	(England)	26 June 2000	27 February 2001	43	19	15	9	44.19
Odense Boldklub (OB)	(Denmark)	July 2005	March 2007	52	27	12	13	51.92
Aalborg Boldspilklub (AaB)	(Denmark)	June 2008	October 2008	10	2	2	6	20
Total				813	335	211	267	41.21

== Honours ==
=== Player ===
Luton Town

- Football League Fourth Division: 1967–68

Aston Villa

- Football League Third Division: 1971–72
- Football League Cup runner-up: 1970–71

Derby County

- Football League First Division: 1974–75
- FA Charity Shield: 1975

Scotland

- British Home Championship: 1975–76, 1976–77

=== Manager ===
Middlesbrough

- Football League Second Division play-offs: 1988
- Football League Third Division promotion: 1986–87
- Full Members' Cup runner-up: 1989–90

Bolton Wanderers

- Football League First Division play-offs: 1995
- Football League Second Division second place automatic promotion: 1992–93
- Football League Cup runner-up: 1994–95

== See also ==
- List of Scotland international footballers born outside Scotland
- List of Scotland national football team captains
