= Doug Ellis =

English businessman

Sir Doug Ellis OBE
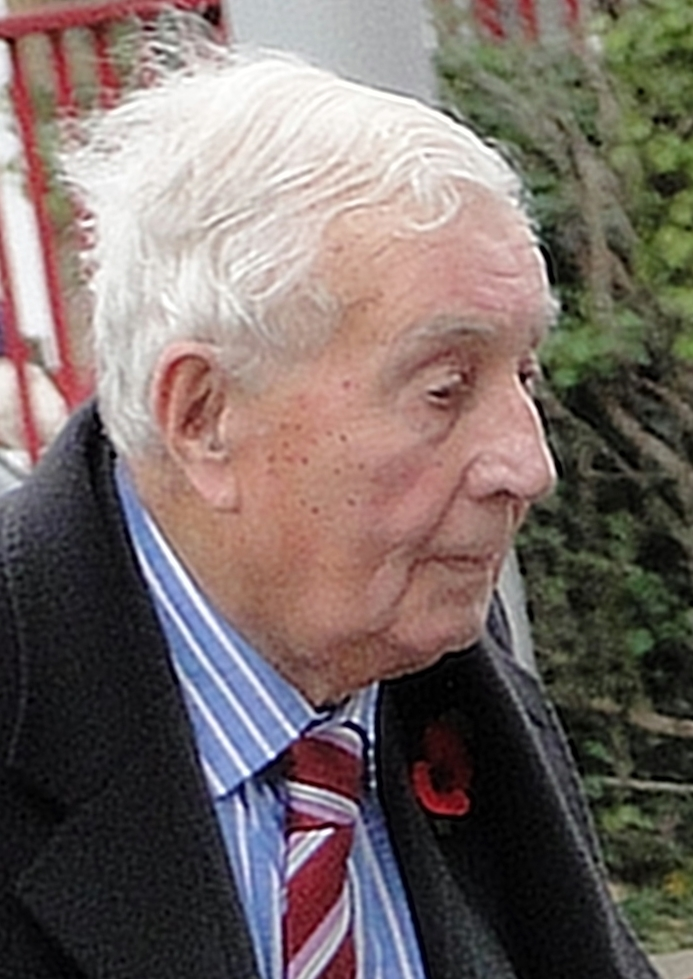
- Doug Ellis, in 2014

Chairman of Aston Villa F.C.
- In office 1982–2006
- Preceded by: Ron Bendall
- Succeeded by: Randy Lerner
- In office 1968–1975
- Preceded by: Norman Smith
- Succeeded by: Sir William Dugdale, Bt

Personal details
- Born: Herbert Douglas Ellis; 3 January 1924 Hooton, England
- Died: 11 October 2018 (aged 94)
- Spouse(s): Audrey Slater (m. 1946, divorced) Heidi Marie Kroeger (m. 1963)
- Children: 3
- Occupation: President Emeritus (Life President) of Aston Villa

Sir Herbert Douglas Ellis, OBE (3 January 1924 – 11 October 2018) was an English entrepreneur. He was the chairman of Aston Villa Football Club from 1968 to 1975, and again from 1982 until 2006. Ellis was knighted in the 2012 New Year Honours List for charitable services.

Ellis stated that his ethos was let modern businessmen run the business and football experts run the football. Former player and assistant-manager, Andy Gray stated

"...he always allowed his managers to spend money and, contrary to public belief, never picked the team."

While still alive, Villa's longest-serving player Charlie Aitken said of Ellis:

"He has his critics, but he has always worked for Villa morning noon and night...His heart is in the right place."

== Early life and career ==
Ellis was born on 3 January 1924 in Hooton, Cheshire. His father, Herbert Ellis, had been on the books of Tranmere Rovers and served in World War I before starting a motor mechanics business. However his health had been compromised from the gas attacks and he died from respiratory complications aged 27 when Doug was three years old. His mother Jane did not remarry but worked to support him and his younger sister, and paid his rail fares to attend secondary school in Chester.

According to Ellis, he attended trials for a football career with Tranmere Rovers with no success. He worked as a railway booking clerk, but always had side-hustles. During World War II, a bout of influenza forced him to turn down a job as third-engineer on a merchant vessel which was subsequently sunk in the North Atlantic with all hands lost. Ellis joined the Fleet Air Arm of the Royal Navy and was based in Ceylon (now Sri Lanka). He met his first wife Audrey Slater in Ceylon in 1946. They had a son together.

The experience of his first trip abroad inspired him to provide low-cost foreign holidays to people of a similar economic background. He obtained a job in a travel agency in Preston and rented a third-floor flat close to Tom Finney's self-built bungalow. Despite his fame, the international footballer continued to use public transport and they would occasionally meet at the local bus-stop. Finney enquired about how Ellis was settling in whereupon he casually mentioned an annoying leak. When arriving home one evening, Ellis's wife greeted him: "You'll never believe who's been on our roof today...Tom Finney!"

Ellis was soon asked to open a new branch in Birmingham's Jewellery Quarter. In addition to the weekly wage, a 1% commission in a growing industry provided relative wealth. The opportunities from a side-hustle arranging emigration to Canada put strain on both his marriage and his employer relationship and he was soon divorced and in business for himself with a finger in many travel and excursion activities, including pioneering package holidays to Spain. Before he was 40, he had become a millionaire. with his company Sunflight.

Ellis married his second wife Heidi Kroeger in 1963, with whom he had two sons. He met the German courier in Benidorm when she was working for a rival company, and persuaded her to join his corporation.

== Sport ==
Ellis was the chairman and major shareholder of Aston Villa for two separate spells, the first being from 1968 to 1975. Ellis was replaced as chairman and finally ousted from the board in 1979. During his absence, Aston Villa enjoyed its greatest period of success in modern times, winning the Football League title in 1981 and the European Cup in 1982. In June 1982, with the support of a shareholders’ rebellion led by Wolverhampton insurance-broker Roger Jeffrey Hipkiss, Ellis ousted Harry Marshall as chairman of Wolverhampton Wanderers, which was 24 hours from liquidation as a consequence of debts of £2.5m. In November 1982, he was elected to the board of the World Professional Billiards and Snooker Association.

Ellis returned to Aston Villa as chairman in 1982, and remained there until selling to Randy Lerner in 2006. Some fans blame him for the decline of the club after the European Cup victory in 1981–82. Within five years, the club was relegated from the top flight, with many of the European Cup-winning team being sold to other teams, although it can be argued that this was due to large debts built up during the previous regime.

Ellis was nicknamed "Deadly Doug" by football pundit Jimmy Greaves, after sacking numerous managers during his tenures as chairman. Aston Villa had 13 different managers during his two spells. Only two won any trophies for the team – Ron Atkinson and Brian Little with the Football League Cup in 1994 and 1996 respectively.

In 1996, Ellis owned 47 per cent of Aston Villa. In May 1997, the club floated on the stock market with a valuation of £126m. Ellis sold a number of his shares at flotation, reducing his shareholding to around 39% of the total shares.

Ellis was reported to be the first football club director to pay himself a salary (in 2005 it was £290,000 after a 12% increase from the previous year) when it was made legal by The Football Association in the early 1980s. He also served on the boards of Birmingham City, Derby County and Wolverhampton Wanderers (as chairman).

In 2004, at the age of 80 and suffering from prostate cancer, Ellis agreed to relinquish some of his control of the club by appointing Bruce Langham as chief executive. Langham resigned in May 2005, reportedly after a disagreement with Ellis. In 2005, underwent a heart bypass operation and, after a three-month absence, returned to his role at Villa Park soon after the start of the 2005–06 season. By this time, some supporters and former club managers criticised Ellis's alleged lack of ambition, noting that the club often struggled to bring in top players.

On 14 August 2006, it was announced that Ellis had agreed to sell the club to American billionaire, Randy Lerner in a deal worth £62.6 million. Ellis stood aside when the takeover was completed on 19 September 2006, becoming a President Emeritus (Life President) of the club.

== Honours and later life ==
In 1994, a stand at Villa Park was named after Ellis. and in 2005, he was appointed an OBE in the 2005 New Year Honours List.

Ellis received an honorary degree from Aston University in July 2007. In January 2012 the Doug Ellis Learning Hub was opened at the University of Birmingham Medical School. Ellis donated £416,000 towards the feature. In April 2013, the newly refurbished Sir Doug Ellis Woodcock Sports Centre at Aston University opened, featuring a new sports hall and squash courts. This work was partly funded by Ellis. Also in 2012, Ellis donated £10,000 to the building of a new school gymnasium at Sutton Coldfield Grammar School for Girls. In his letter to the school, he wrote: "You clearly have a school to be proud of … and I wish you every success in achieving your goal".

On 4 March 2012, Ellis was knighted for his charity work. He died on 11 October 2018, aged 94.
