= Vic Crowe =

Welsh footballer & manager (1932–2009)

Personal information
- Full name: Victor Herbert Crowe
- Date of birth: 31 January 1932
- Place of birth: Abercynon, Wales
- Date of death: 21 January 2009 (aged 76)
- Place of death: Sutton Coldfield, England
- Position: Wing-half

Youth career
- –1951: West Bromwich Albion
- 1951–1954: Aston Villa

Senior career*
Years	Team	Apps	(Gls)
1954–1964	Aston Villa	350	(12)
1964–1967	Peterborough United	56	(0)
1967–1969	Atlanta Chiefs	51	(2)
Total		457	(14)

International career
1958–1963	Wales	16	(0)

Managerial career
- 1970–1974: Aston Villa
- 1975–1976: Portland Timbers
- 1980–1982: Portland Timbers
- * Club domestic league appearances and goals

Victor Herbert Crowe (31 January 1932 – 21 January 2009) was a Welsh international football player and later football manager.

Crowe was born in Abercynon, South Wales while his father Francis 'Frank' Crowe was playing for Merthyr Town. When Vic was only two years old the family moved to Handsworth in Birmingham.

Vic Crowe died on 21 January 2009, at the age of 76, after a long illness.

== Career ==
On leaving school, Vic Crowe played for Erdington Albion, the West Bromwich Albion nursery team, and whilst with the Army in Scotland, had trials with Stirling Albion, but signed for Aston Villa in 1951 and would spend most of his career with the Birmingham club.

Crowe established himself in the Villa team when Danny Blanchflower vacated the right-half berth in 1954. He missed the 1957 FA Cup Final due to injury but captained the side to the Second Division title in 1960 and League Cup Final success in 1961. He was capped 16 times by Wales.

Crowe was one of Phil Woosnam's first signings after he was appointed player-coach of the Atlanta Chiefs and so trusting was Woosnam of Crowe that he appointed him his assistant off the field and team captain on it. Crowe was also instrumental in the Chiefs' recruitment for their maiden season in the National Professional Soccer League. For instance, it was Crowe who approached Peter McParland about a move to the Chiefs and he spotted goalkeeper Sven Lindberg while scouting in Sweden.

At the end of his first season with the Chiefs, Crowe was voted the club's Most Valuable Player.

He returned to Villa as a reserve team coach in September 1969. On 19 January 1970, with Villa bottom of the Second Division, manager Tommy Docherty was sacked. and was replaced by Crowe. but he was unable to prevent Villa being relegated when at the end of the 1969–70 season. The following season he led his Third Division team to the League Cup Final against Tottenham Hotspur, which Villa lost. He saw his side finish top of Division Three in 1972, however, breaking many records along the way. He was sacked in 1974 after his side finished 14th in Division Two. Charlie Aitken's view was that Crowe left Villa much stronger than when he was appointed.

In 1975, Crowe went to the United States to take part in the North American Soccer League, taking the manager's position with Portland Timbers. He brought a cast of English players with him, many of them young players from the Midlands area, as well as former Wales international forward Brian Godfrey whom he appointed Timbers' captain. They proceeded to win the Western Division championship and advanced all the way to the NASL final, losing 2–0 to Tampa Bay Rowdies. In their two home playoff games, "The Lads" success forced the club to add temporary seating to accommodate their fans, and the team played before two crowds in excess of 30,000, totals unheard of in American soccer at the time.

Crowe stayed in Portland through the 1976 season before returning to England. The Timbers beckoned again in 1980, however, and he returned for three more seasons in America before the Timbers club folded after the 1982 season. Although his later teams never captured the success of that first year, he left an indelible mark on soccer in the Pacific Northwest by introducing thousands of Portland area residents to the joys of the game. Today, Portland is a soccer hotbed. In 2001 the Timbers re-emerged as a member of the professional USL First Division, and in 2011 Portland moved into the highest tier of American soccer by joining Major League Soccer. The modern edition of the Timbers play in the same stadium where Crowe and his lads excelled that first year in 1975.

== Honours ==
=== As a player ===
Aston Villa

- Football League Cup: 1960–61; runner-up: 1962–63

=== As a manager ===
Aston Villa

- Football League Cup runner-up: 1970–71
