= Brian Godfrey =

Welsh footballer and manager

Personal information
- Full name: Brian Cameron Godfrey
- Date of birth: 1 May 1940
- Place of birth: Flint, Wales
- Date of death: 11 February 2010 (aged 69)
- Place of death: Nicosia, Cyprus
- Height: 5 ft 8 in (1.73 m)
- Position: Striker

Senior career*
Years	Team	Apps	(Gls)
1958–1960	Everton	1	(0)
1960–1963	Scunthorpe United	77	(24)
1963–1967	Preston North End	127	(52)
1967–1971	Aston Villa	143	(22)
1971–1973	Bristol Rovers	81	(16)
1973–1975	Newport County	118	(14)
1975	Portland Timbers (loan)	20	(3)
1976–1979	Bath City	27	(2)

International career
1964–1965	Wales	3	(2)

Managerial career
- 1976–1979: Bath City
- 1979–1983: Exeter City
- 1983–1987: Weymouth
- 1987–1991: Gloucester City
- 1992–1994: Gloucester City
- * Club domestic league appearances and goals

Brian Cameron Godfrey (1 May 1940 – 11 February 2010) was a Welsh professional footballer.

== Career ==
=== Playing career ===
He was an inside forward who started his league career at Everton where he only made one appearance before joining Scunthorpe United in June 1960. He made his League debut for the Iron on the opening day of the season away to Charlton Athletic on 20 August 1960, scoring on his home debut five days later against Ipswich Town.

He partnered ace marksman Barrie Thomas in the Iron's attack and helped them nearly reach the top flight when finishing 4th in the Second Division in 1961–62. This is Scunthorpe's highest ever position and resulted in him being spotted by the Welsh Under-23 selectors, becoming the first United player ever to receive such an honour. His last League game for the Iron was at home to Portsmouth on 21 September 1963.

Preston North End paid £8,000 for him in October 1963. He made his debut for Preston a couple of weeks later away at Northampton Town. He scored ten goals in his first fourteen League games for the club, including a hat trick against Ipswich Town in a 5–1 away win. In the 1965–66 season, Godfrey was Preston's leading goalscorer including a four-minute hat trick in the last game of the season: a 9–0 win against Cardiff City.

His goalscoring exploits did not go unnoticed, as he certainly impressed the Welsh selectors after joining the famous Lilywhites, gaining three full international caps. Two of these were in 1964: against Northern Ireland in April 1964 at Swansea, scoring one goal on his international debut, and against Denmark in Copenhagen in the October. His third and final Welsh appearance came against Italy in Florence in May 1965, Godfrey getting the consolation goal in a 4–1 defeat. Everton apart, his entire career was spent with clubs outside the First Division. His biggest disappointment was on signing for Second Division Preston, and not being in the side that made its way to Wembley, losing in the FA Cup Final to West Ham United, after scoring in the sixth round victory over Oxford United. He did, however, help Preston finish third in the Second Division, just missing out on promotion.

Godfrey was transferred, with Brian Greenhalgh, to Aston Villa in September 1967. He scored on his Villa debut, and he and Greenhalgh scored 18 goals between them in their first 17 games in Villa colours. Unfortunately, despite their efforts, Villa were relegated to the Third Division at the end of the 1969–70 season for the first time in the club's history. He managed to play and Captain Villa at Wembley in the 1970–71 League Cup Final against Tottenham Hotspur while they were still a Third Division side, but finished on the Runners-up side. Villa also just missed out on promotion, finishing in fourth place in the League.

He joined Bristol Rovers from Aston Villa for £35,000 and Ray Graydon in part-exchange in September 1971. At Eastville he became an immediate inspiration to a young, developing Rovers team. One early highlight was a hat trick in a 7–1 home win over Bradford City. In the 1972–73 pre-season Watney Cup tournament Brian was a member of the team that beat Sheffield United in the final 7–6 on penalties, after the game finished scoreless in front of 19,768 spectators.

Brian Godfrey also played his part in Rovers famous 2–1 victory at Old Trafford over Manchester United in a third round League Cup replay, the United team including the likes of Bobby Charlton, George Best and Brian Kidd. He helped Bristol Rovers to sixth and fifth places in the Third Division in consecutive seasons. They reached the fifth round of the League Cup in 1971–72 after beating three Second Division teams in Sunderland, Charlton Athletic and Queens Park Rangers before losing to First Division opponents and eventual winners Stoke City.

In total, Godfrey scored 16 goals in 81 league games for Rovers, prior to joining Newport County for £10,000 in June 1973 and becoming County's record signing at the time. From 1973 to 1974 he was ever-present in the County side making 46 league appearances and scoring 7 goals, including a hat trick against Workington in a 4–0 home win. Godfrey was selected in the 1974 Fourth Division PFA Team of the Year. He left Newport at the end of the 1974–75 season having scored 18 goals in a total of 118 appearances for the club. He then had a short spell in the North American Soccer League during the summer of 1975 as captain of the expansion team Portland Timbers, leading the club to the NASL league final.

=== Coaching career ===
After that, Godfrey tried his hand in management for the first time, joining Bath City in July 1976. As a player-manager he guided Bath to fourth position in the Southern League in his first season, and then to the Championship in 1977–78. That year he also took Bath to the 1st round of the FA Cup, losing to Plymouth Argyle in a replay.

His success with Bath did not go unnoticed, and in the middle of the following season he was approached by Exeter City, and left to succeed Bobby Saxton as Exeter manager in January 1979. He stayed for three and a half years until resigning in June 1983. Godfrey's most successful season was 1980–81, guiding Exeter into the sixth round of the FA Cup for only the second time in their history. During their cup run they overcame First Division Leicester City 3–1 and Second Division Newcastle United 4–0, both in replays at St James Park, before losing to First Division Tottenham Hotspur at White Hart Lane, with Graham Roberts and Paul Miller scoring in their club's 2–0 victory. Spurs went on to win the cup that year. Godfrey took Exeter to ninth in the League during his first season and eighth in 1979–80, City's best ever finish in the Division 3/4 structure. He quit at the end of the 1982–83 season after Exeter marginally avoided relegation to the Fourth Division.

He had further managerial success at both Weymouth and Bath City again before joining Gloucester City in 1987. He guided them to the Southern League Midlands title in 1988–89 and won the DML Midland Division Manager of the Year (1988/89).

The 1989–90 season saw Godfrey take Gloucester City to the second round of the FA Cup for the first time in the club's history, losing 0–1 at home to Cardiff City after a 2–2 draw at Ninian Park. The Tigers also finished ninth in the Premier Division. The following year he built a side that came within three minutes of the Southern League title and promotion to the GM Vauxhall Conference, eventually finishing runners-up to Farnborough Town after the Hampshire side scored a late goal at Atherstone Town to give them the Championship on the last day of the season.

Godfrey was sacked in 1991 following the breakup of his side due to financial problems. He was to return in February 1992 for a further spell before leaving the club in April 1994. He remained involved in football with Shortwood United before moving onto Cinderford Town, and then taking up scouting for Newport. He returned once more to Gloucester City as assistant manager, originally to Tommy Callinan until he resigned in 2001, and then with Chris Burns who took the chance to begin his football management career.

== Personal life and death ==
Godfrey retired at the end of the 2002–03 season to start a new life in Cyprus, and saw his long service to football rewarded with a testimonial between Gloucester City and Aston Villa. He died in a hospital in Nicosia near his home in Cyprus after a long battle with leukaemia on 11 February 2010. He was remarried by this time, having previously been married for 32 years with a family of three daughters.

Paying tribute to Godfrey, Dave Phillips, then Chairman of Gloucester City, said that Godfrey had "played a dramatic part in the progress of the club."

"He took us out of the doldrums during a period when we weren't doing that well. He will be remembered mainly for winning the Southern League Midland Division Championship as manager in 1989. From my experience, he spoke it as it was, and he was a great favourite of the fans because of that. He was football through and through.

== Honours ==
Aston Villa

- Football League Cup runner-up: 1970–71
