= 1974–75 Aston Villa F.C. season =

English football club season

Aston Villa
1974–75 season
- Chairman: (1) Doug Ellis (2) Sir William Dugdale, Bt
- Manager: Ron Saunders
- Stadium: Villa Park
- Second Division: 2nd
- FA Cup: Fifth round
- League Cup: Winners

The 1974–75 English football season was Aston Villa's 76th season in the Football League, this season playing in the Football League Second Division. Villa won promotion and qualified for Europe for the first time by beating Norwich to win the 1975 League Cup final.

Ron Saunders was appointed manager in June 1974, replacing Vic Crowe who had been sacked in April. Saunders guided Aston Villa to League Cup success against Norwich in the only final of the competition between two Second Division teams. Both clubs were also promoted to the First Division.

There were debut appearances for Frank Carrodus (150), Leighton Phillips (140), Frank Pimblett (11), Steve Hunt (6) Tony Betts (4), Keith Masefield (4), Graham Moseley (3), and Alan Little (3).

== Second Division ==
Pos	Team	Pld	W	D	L	GF	GA	GAv	Pts	Qualification or relegation
1	Manchester United (C, P)	42	26	9	7	66	30	2.200	61	Promotion to the First Division
2	Aston Villa (P)	42	25	8	9	79	32	2.469	58	UEFA Cup first round and promotion to the First Division (Note: Aston Villa qualified for the UEFA Cup as the 1974–75 Football League Cup winners.)
3	Norwich City (P)	42	20	13	9	58	37	1.568	53	Promotion to the First Division
4	Sunderland	42	19	13	10	65	35	1.857	51	
5	Bristol City	42	21	8	13	47	33	1.424	50	

Rules for classification: 1) Points; 2) Goal average; 3) Goals scored
(C) Champions; (P) Promoted

=== Matches ===
17 August 1974 1	York City	1–1	Aston Villa	York
	Lyons 8'	Report	Graydon 29'	Stadium: Bootham Crescent; Attendance: 8740

20 August 1974 2	Hull City	1–1	Aston Villa	Hull
	Wagstaff 74'	Report	Robson 79'	Stadium: Boothferry Park; Attendance: 8712

24 August 1974 3	Aston Villa	1–1	Norwich City	Birmingham
	Graydon 52'	Report	Suggett 75'	Stadium: Villa Park; Attendance: 23,297

28 August 1974 4	Aston Villa	6–0	Hull City	Birmingham
	Morgan 30', 49', 78'; Graydon 52'; B. Little 70'; Hamilton 85'	Report		Stadium: Villa Park; Attendance: 18,973

31 August 1974 5	Bolton Wanderers	1–0	Aston Villa	Bolton
	P. Jones 26'	Report		Stadium: Burnden Park; Attendance: 12,976

7 September 1974 6	Aston Villa	3–1	Orient	Birmingham
	Morgan 14'; Graydon 32', 70' (pen.)	Report	Downing 74'	Stadium: Villa Park; Attendance: 16,802

14 September 1974 7	Bristol Rovers	2–0	Aston Villa	Bristol
	Warboys 55', 85'	Report		Stadium: Eastville; Attendance: 14,035

21 September 1974 8	Aston Villa	3–0	Millwall	Birmingham
	Graydon 44', 54' (pen.), 70'	Report		Stadium: Villa Park; Attendance: 21,375

28 September 1974 9	Southampton	0–0	Aston Villa	Southampton
		Report		Stadium: The Dell; Attendance: 18,599

2 October 1974 10	Aston Villa	3–0	Nottingham Forest	Birmingham
	Graydon 22'; Hamilton 44'; Leonard 74'	Report		Stadium: Villa Park; Attendance: 20,357

5 October 1974 11	Oldham Athletic	1–2	Aston Villa	Oldham
	Garwood 52'	Report	Hicks 55' (o.g.); Graydon 79'	Stadium: Boundary Park; Attendance: 15,574

12 October 1974 12	Aston Villa	1–0	Blackpool	Birmingham
	Graydon 46'	Report		Stadium: Villa Park; Attendance: 25,763

19 October 1974 13	Sunderland	0–0	Aston Villa	Sunderland
		Report		Stadium: Roker Park; Attendance: 33,232

26 October 1974 14	Aston Villa	3–1	Sheffield Wednesday	Birmingham
	Phillips 6'; Nicholl 35'; Graydon 43' (pen.)	Report	Craig 22'	Stadium: Villa Park; Attendance: 23,977

2 November 1974 15	Fulham	3–1	Aston Villa	London
	Lacy 2'; Busby 48'; Lloyd 52'	Report	B. Little 63'	Stadium: Craven Cottage; Attendance: 10,979

9 November 1974 16	Aston Villa	0–1	Notts County	Birmingham
		Report	Needham 44'	Stadium: Villa Park; Attendance: 22,182

16 November 1974 17	Manchester United	2–1	Aston Villa	Manchester
	Daly 69' (pen.), 81'	Report	Hamilton 12'	Stadium: Old Trafford; Attendance: 55,625

23 November 1974 18	Aston Villa	2–0	Portsmouth	Birmingham
	Hamilton 3'; B. Little 22'	Report		Stadium: Villa Park; Attendance: 16,821

29 November 1974 19	Aston Villa	0–0	Oxford United	Birmingham
		Report		Stadium: Villa Park; Attendance: 18,554

7 December 1974 20	Bristol City	1–0	Aston Villa	Bristol
	Mann 28'	Report		Stadium: Ashton Gate; Attendance: 13,390

14 December 1974 21	Aston Villa	4–0	York City	Birmingham
	Graydon 3'; Nicholl 10'; B. Little 71'; Hamilton 86'	Report		Stadium: Villa Park; Attendance: 15,840

21 December 1974 22	West Bromwich Albion	2–0	Aston Villa	West Bromwich
	Cumbes 10' (o.g.); Mayo 66'	Report		Stadium: The Hawthorns; Attendance: 23,011

26 December 1974 23	Aston Villa	1–0	Bristol Rovers	Birmingham
	Graydon 60'	Report		Stadium: Villa Park; Attendance: 21,557

28 December 1974 24	Cardiff City	3–1	Aston Villa	Cardiff
	Showers 2'; Buchanan 22'; Whitham 34'	Report	Hamilton 55'	Stadium: Ninian Park; Attendance: 11,040

11 January 1975 25	Aston Villa	2–0	Bristol City	Birmingham
	B. Little 34'; Hamilton 82'	Report		Stadium: Villa Park; Attendance: 21,762

18 January 1975 26	Oxford United	1–2	Aston Villa	Oxford
	Clarke 84'	Report	B. Little 60'; Nicholl 89'	Stadium: Manor Ground; Attendance: 9872

1 February 1975 27	Notts County	1–3	Aston Villa	Nottingham
	Scanlon 7'	Report	B. Little 30', 76'; Carrodus 89'	Stadium: Meadow Lane; Attendance: 16,651

8 February 1975 28	Aston Villa	1–1	Fulham	Birmingham
	Nicholl 56'	Report	Busby 26'	Stadium: Villa Park; Attendance: 28,533

18 February 1975 29	Portsmouth	2–3	Aston Villa	Portsmouth
	Mellows 33' (pen.); Graham 36'	Report	Carrodus 1'; Graydon 20'; B. Little 37'	Stadium: Fratton Park; Attendance: 13,355
Note: Neil Rioch's last appearance

22 February 1975 30	Aston Villa	2–0	Manchester United	Birmingham
	Graydon 4'; Aitken 24'	Report		Stadium: Villa Park; Attendance: 39,156

5 March 1975 31	Aston Villa	0–0	Bolton Wanderers	Birmingham
		Report		Stadium: Villa Park; Attendance: 39,322

8 March 1975 32	Nottingham Forest	2–3	Aston Villa	Nottingham
	O'Hare 15'; Butlin 40'	Report	Graydon 29', 42'; B. Little 67'	Stadium: City Ground; Attendance: 20,205

15 March 1975 33	Aston Villa	3–0	Southampton	Birmingham
	Leonard 69'; Graydon 75'; Holmes 80' (o.g.)	Report		Stadium: Villa Park; Attendance: 31,967

22 March 1975 34	Orient	1–0	Aston Villa	London
	Heppolette 82'	Report		Stadium: Brisbane Road; Attendance: 9466

29 March 1975 35	Aston Villa	3–1	West Bromwich Albion	Birmingham
	Leonard 59', 66'; Hamilton 64'	Report	T. Brown 25'	Stadium: Villa Park; Attendance: 47,574

1 April 1975 36	Millwall	1–3	Aston Villa	London
	Allder 15'	Report	Hamilton 44' (pen.); Leonard 77'; B. Little 89'	Stadium: The Den; Attendance: 13,115

9 April 1975 37	Aston Villa	2–0	Cardiff City	Birmingham
	B. Little 65', 76'	Report		Stadium: Villa Park; Attendance: 32,748

12 April 1975 38	Aston Villa	5–0	Oldham Athletic	Birmingham
	B. Little 10', 35', 81'; Hicks 58' (o.g.); Hamilton 90'	Report		Stadium: Villa Park; Attendance: 36,224

19 April 1975 39	Blackpool	0–3	Aston Villa	Blackpool
		Report	Phillips 7'; Hatton 18' (o.g.); B. Little 60'	Stadium: Bloomfield Road; Attendance: 20,762

23 April 1975 40	Sheffield Wednesday	0–4	Aston Villa	Sheffield
		Report	Leonard 24'; B. Little 31', 73'; Ross 80' (pen.)	Stadium: Hillsborough; Attendance: 23,605

26 April 1975 41	Aston Villa	2–0	Sunderland	Birmingham
	Ross 78' (pen.); B. Little 84'	Report		Stadium: Villa Park; Attendance: 57,266

30 April 1975 42	Norwich City	1–4	Aston Villa	Norwich
	Boyer 25'	Report	Leonard 11'; Gidman 20'; McDonald 76'; Carrodus 86'	Stadium: Carrow Road; Attendance: 35,999

== League Cup ==
11 September 1974 2nd Round	Aston Villa	1–1	Everton	Birmingham
	Nicholl 30'		Latchford 50'	Stadium: Villa Park; Attendance: 29,640

18 September 1974 2nd Round Replay	Everton	0–3	Aston Villa	Liverpool
		Report	Morgan 49'; Carrodus 58'; Graydon 80'	Stadium: Goodison Park; Attendance: 24,595

9 October 1974 3rd Round	Crewe Alexandra	2–2	Aston Villa	Crewe
	Duffey 49'; Reed 85'		Morgan 10'; Leonard 57'	Stadium: Gresty Road; Attendance: 12,290

16 October 1974 3rd Round Replay	Aston Villa	1–0	Crewe Alexandra	Birmingham
	Hamilton 88'			Stadium: Villa Park; Attendance: 24,007

12 November 1974 4th Round	Hartlepool United	1–1	Aston Villa	Hartlepool
	Moore 60'		Aitken 34'	Stadium: Victoria Park; Attendance: 12,305

25 November 1974 4th Round Replay	Aston Villa	6–1	Hartlepool United	Birmingham
	Hamilton 6' (pen.), 41'; B. Little 52', 77'; Graydon 82', 89' (pen.)		Gauden 66'	Stadium: Villa Park; Attendance: 17,686

3 December 1974 5th Round	Colchester United	1–2	Aston Villa	Colchester
	Froggatt 85'		A. Little 28'; Graydon 61'	Stadium: Layer Road; Attendance: 11,871

15 January 1975 Semi-Final 1st Leg	Chester	2–2	Aston Villa	Chester
	Owen 44'; Moore 79'		McDonald 15'; Graydon 50'	Stadium: Sealand Road; Attendance: 19,000

22 January 1975 Semi-Final 2nd Leg	Aston Villa	3–2	Chester	Birmingham
	Leonard 19', 27'; B. Little 83'		Mason 33'; James 61'	Stadium: Villa Park; Attendance: 47,732

1 March 1975 Final	Aston Villa	1–0	Norwich City	London
	Graydon 79'			Stadium: Wembley; Attendance: 95,946

== FA Cup ==
4 January 1975 3rd Round	Oldham Athletic	0–3	Aston Villa	Oldham
			B. Little 34'; Nicholl 56'; Graydon 83'	Stadium: Boundary Park; Attendance: 14,510

25 January 1975 4th Round	Aston Villa	4–1	Sheffield United	Birmingham
	Leonard 12', 87'; Nicholl 50'; Graydon 61'		Field 70'	Stadium: Villa Park; Attendance: 35,881

15 February 1975 5th Round	Ipswich Town	3–2	Aston Villa	Ipswich
	Johnson 63'; Hamilton 78', 84'		McDonald 10'; Evans 50'	Stadium: Portman Road; Attendance: 31,297

== See also ==
- List of Aston Villa F.C. records and statistics
