= 1975–76 Aston Villa F.C. season =

English football club season

Aston Villa
1975–76 season
- Chairman: Sir William Dugdale, Bt
- Manager: Ron Saunders
- Stadium: Villa Park
- First Division: 16th
- FA Cup: Third round
- League Cup: Third round

Second City Derby
- 33--24--24

The 1975–76 English football season was Aston Villa's first season in Europe and 77th season in the Football League, their first season in the top division for eight years.

In October 1975, at the age of 19, Andy Gray (167) moved south to newly promoted Villa for £110,000. Other debuts included Gordon Cowans (414), Dennis Mortimer (317), John Deehan (110), John Burridge (65), and John Overton (3). Dave Richardson joined Aston Villa in 1976 as Youth Development Officer from Leicester City, unwittingly bringing paedophile, Ted Langford, from his old club. Richardson secured schoolboy player Steve Froggatt from Leicester.

10 April 1976: Liverpool draw 0–0 against Aston Villa. In the Second City derby both teams won their home match.

== UEFA Cup ==
Having won the League Cup in the previous season, Villa qualified for Europe for the first time.

Round	Country	Club	Away	Home
1R	Belgium	Royal Antwerp	1–4	0–1

== League table ==
Pos	Team	Pld	W	D	L	GF	GA	GAv	Pts
14	Coventry City	42	13	14	15	47	57	0.825	40
15	Newcastle United	42	15	9	18	71	62	1.145	39
16	Aston Villa	42	11	17	14	51	59	0.864	39
17	Arsenal	42	13	10	19	47	53	0.887	36
18	West Ham United	42	13	10	19	48	71	0.676	36

Source: World Football
Rules for classification: 1) Points; 2) Goal average; 3) Goals scored

=== Matches ===
Date	Opponent	Venue	Result	Note	Scorers
16 August 1975	Leeds	H	1–2	—	Leighton Phillips
19 August 1975	QPR	A	1–1	—	Keith Leonard
23 August 1975	Norwich	A	3–5	—	Ray Graydon (2, pen), Charlie Aitken
27 August 1975	Manchester City	H	1–0	—	Keith Leonard
30 August 1975	Coventry	H	1–0	—	Ray Graydon
6 September 1975	Newcastle	A	0–3	—	—
13 September 1975	Arsenal	H	2–0	—	Leighton Phillips, Keith Leonard
20 September 1975	Liverpool	A	0–3	—	—
23 September 1975	Wolves	A	0–0	—	—
27 September 1975	Birmingham	H	2–1	—	Chico Hamilton, Brian Little
4 October 1975	Boro	A	0–0	—	—
11 October 1975	Spurs	H	1–1	—	Andy Gray
18 October 1975	Everton	A	1–2	—	Chris Nicholl
25 October 1975	Burnley	H	1–1	—	Own Goal
1 November 1975	Ipswich	A	0–3	—	—
8 November 1975	Sheffield United	H	5–1	—	Andy Gray, Chico Hamilton (2), John Deehan, Ray Graydon (pen)
15 November 1975	United	A	0–2	—	—
22 November 1975	Everton	H	3–1	—	Andy Gray (2), Own Goal
29 November 1975	Leicester	H	1–1	—	Ray Graydon
6 December 1975	Stoke	A	1–1	—	Ray Graydon
13 December 1975	Norwich	H	3–2	—	Ray Graydon, John Deehan (2)
20 December 1975	Leeds	A	0–1	—	—
26 December 1975	West Ham	H	4–1	—	John Deehan (2), Andy Gray, Chico Hamilton
27 December 1975	Derby	A	0–2	—	—
10 January 1976	Arsenal	A	0–0	—	—
17 January 1976	Newcastle	H	1–1	—	Own Goal
31 January 1976	QPR	H	0–2	—	—
7 February 1976	Manchester City	A	1–2	—	Andy Gray
14 February 1976	Sheffield United	A	1–2	—	Ray Graydon
21 February 1976	United	H	2–1	—	Bobby McDonald, Andy Gray
24 February 1976	Wolves	H	1–1	—	Ray Graydon
28 February 1976	Burnley	A	2–2	—	Ray Graydon, Andy Gray
6 March 1976	Ipswich	H	0–0	—	—
13 March 1976	Spurs	A	2–5	—	Ray Graydon, Andy Gray
20 March 1976	Leicester	A	2–2	—	Chris Nicholl (2)
27 March 1976	Stoke	H	0–0	—	—
3 April 1976	Birmingham	A	2–3	—	Andy Gray, Ray Graydon (pen)
10 April 1976	Liverpool	H	0–0	—	—
13 April 1976	Coventry	A	1–1	—	Chris Nicholl
17 April 1976	West Ham	A	2–2	—	John Deehan, Steve Hunt
19 April 1976	Derby	H	1–0	—	Bobby McDonald
24 April 1976	Boro	H	2–1	—	John Deehan, Frank Carrodus

Source: avfchistory.co.uk

== FA Cup ==
Teams from the Football League First and Second Division entered in the Third round. The third round of games in the FA Cup were mainly played on 3 January 1976, with two matches played two days earlier on New Year's Day. Replays were mainly played midweek over 6–7 January or the week after but one occurred on the 24th instead. Holders West Ham United were eliminated by Liverpool.

Tie no	Home team	Score	Away team	Date
2	Southampton	1–1	Aston Villa	3 January 1976
Replay	Aston Villa	1–2	Southampton	7 January 1976

== League Cup ==
=== Second round ===
Home team	Score	Away team	Date
Aston Villa	2–0	Oldham Athletic	10 September 1975

=== Third round ===
Home team	Score	Away team	Date
Aston Villa	1–2	Manchester United	8 October 1975

== First team squad ==
- (Scotland) Jake Findlay, goalkeeper, 21
- (England) James Cumbes, goalkeeper, 31
- (England) John Burridge, goalkeeper, 23
- (Wales) Leighton Phillips, defender, 25
- (Northern Ireland) Chris Nicholl, centre-back, 28
- (Scotland) Ian Ross, centre-back, 27
- (Scotland) Charlie Aitken, left-back, 33
- (England) John Robson, left-back, 25
- (Scotland) Bobby McDonald, left-back, 20
- (England) John Gidman, right-back, 21
- (England) Keith Masefield, right-back, 18
- (England) Gordon Cowans, midfielder, 16
- (Australia) Frank Pimblett, central midfield, 18
- (England) Dennis Mortimer, midfielder, 23
- (England) Ian Hamilton, central midfield, 24
- (England) Frank Carrodus, forward, 26
- (England) Ray Graydon, forward, 27
- (England) Stephen Hunt, forward, 19
- (England) Brian Little, forward, 21
- (Scotland) Andy Gray, centre-forward, 19
- (England) Keith Leonard, forward, 24
- (Northern Ireland) Sammy Morgan, centre-forward, 28

== See also ==
- List of Aston Villa F.C. records and statistics
