= Ray Graydon =

English footballer and manager (born 1947)

Personal information
- Full name: Raymond Jack Graydon
- Date of birth: 21 July 1947 (age 79)
- Place of birth: Bristol, England
- Height: 5 ft 10 in (1.78 m)
- Position: Winger

Senior career*
Years	Team	Apps	(Gls)
1965–1971	Bristol Rovers	133	(33)
1971–1977	Aston Villa	193	(68)
1977–1978	Coventry City	20	(5)
1978	Washington Diplomats	26	(4)
1978–1981	Oxford United	42	(10)
Total		414	(120)

International career
1965–1966	England Youth		

Managerial career
- 1998–2002: Walsall
- 2002–2004: Bristol Rovers
- * Club domestic league appearances and goals

Raymond Jack Graydon (born 21 July 1947) is an English former footballer and manager. In a 16-year professional career in the English Football League and North American Soccer League he scored 139 goals in 484 league and cup appearances.

A winger, he began his career at hometown club Bristol Rovers in 1965 and scored 38 goals from 155 league and cup competitions in a six-season stay. He was sold to Aston Villa for £50,000 in July 1971 and went on to help Villa to win promotion out of the Third Division as champions in 1971–72 and then out of the Second Division in 1974–75. He scored the only goal of the 1975 League Cup final and won the League Cup for a second time in 1977. He was also nominated for the Second Division PFA Team of the Year in 1974–75 and featured on the losing side in the 1972 FA Charity Shield. He was sold to Coventry City for a fee of £35,000 in 1977 and then moved to the United States to play for the Washington Diplomats in 1978, where he picked up a runners-up medal for the 1978 President's Cup Football Tournament. Later, he returned to England to play for Oxford United and retired in 1981.

Graydon coached at Southampton, Oxford United, Watford, Queens Park Rangers and Port Vale, before he was appointed manager of Walsall in May 1998. He led the club to promotion out of the Second Division in 1998–99 before repeating the feat via the play-offs in 2001. He lost his job in January 2002 and was appointed Bristol Rovers manager two months later. He was sacked in January 2004 and later briefly served Leicester City as a first-team coach. In July 2009, Walsall fans voted to honour him with a star on the Birmingham Walk of Stars.

== Playing career ==
=== Bristol Rovers ===
Graydon was born in Bristol and began his career with his hometown team, Bristol Rovers, making eight Third Division appearances under Bert Tann in the 1965–66 season. He featured three times in the 1966–67 season before scoring one goal in 13 appearances in the 1967–68 campaign. Fred Ford took charge at the Eastville Stadium for the 1968–69 season, and Graydon scored nine goals from 36 appearances as the "Pirates" posted a 16th-place finish. Under new manager Bill Dodgin Sr., the "Gas" finished third in the 1969–70 campaign, with Graydon contributing 14 goals from 43 matches. Rovers slipped to sixth place in 1970–71, with Graydon again scoring 14 goals from 52 appearances.

=== Aston Villa ===
In July 1971, Graydon secured a £50,000 move to Aston Villa, with captain Brian Godfrey also moving in the opposite direction. He missed just one of Villa's 46 league games in the 1971–72 season, scoring 14 goals as the club secured the Third Division title with a five-point margin over Brighton & Hove Albion. Derby County and Leeds United declined the chance to play in the 1972 FA Charity Shield, so Villa accepted the invitation to play Manchester City at Villa Park, losing the match 1–0 following a penalty from Francis Lee. Graydon went on to score ten goals from 37 appearances during the 1972–73 campaign, helping Vic Crowe's side to a third-place finish in the Second Division. He then scored eight goals from 26 matches in the 1973–74 season, as Villa dropped to 14th-place.

After Ron Saunders succeeded Crowe as manager in June 1974, Graydon managed to score 11 goals in the first 12 league matches of the 1974–75 season. The "Villans" then overcame Everton, Crewe Alexandra, Hartlepool United, Colchester United and Chester to reach the 1975 League Cup final at Wembley Stadium. They faced Norwich City in the final, and Graydon scored the only goal of the game on 79 minutes, converting a penalty won by Chris Nicholl; his penalty was saved by Kevin Keelan, but Graydon managed to score from the rebound. He finished the season as the club's top-scorer, claiming 27 goals from 50 appearances, as Villa secured promotion as the division's runners-up. He was named on the Second Division PFA Team of the Year, alongside teammate John Gidman.

Graydon again finished as the club's top-scorer in 1975–76, scoring 14 goals from 44 appearances as Villa posted a 16th-place finish in the First Division. He then scored seven goals from 23 matches in the 1976–77 campaign, helping the club to a fourth-place finish, and he also picked up a second League Cup winner's medal. Villa beat Manchester City, Norwich City, Wrexham, Millwall and Queens Park Rangers, before facing Everton in the final. Graydon was unable to play in the Wembley final or the replay at Hillsborough Stadium due to injury but was able to make the starting eleven for the second replay at Old Trafford. Again the teams took the game into extra time, before Brian Little scored the winning goal for a 3–2 victory. At the end of the season, Saunders accepted an offer for Graydon from Leicester City, though the move fell through after the player met Leicester manager Frank McLintock.

"I was given permission to get to the middle or to the near post and that is where a lot of my goals came from – from being in the box. It sounds so simple. But it took a lot work and everyone in the team had to know their jobs and the runs each of us were going to make. Now I can look back on some wonderful memories. I joined Villa in the Third Division and we went up three, two one. I then won two League Cup finals. It was fairytale stuff and I loved every minute."

— Graydon, speaking in November 2017, reflecting on his time in Birmingham.

=== Later career ===
Graydon joined Coventry City for the 1977–78 season for a fee of £35,000. Although in and out of the side, he still made a significant contribution to what would be one of the most exciting campaigns in the club's 34-year top-flight history. Manager Gordon Milne played the whole season with a 4–2–4 formation with Graydon and Tommy Hutchison playing as out-and-out wingers. The side also boasted Mick Ferguson, Ian Wallace, Terry Yorath, Graham Oakey, Bobby McDonald and Jim Blyth.

The "Sky Blues" finished sixth in the First Division and Graydon left Highfield Road at the end of the season and thereafter had a spell in the North American Soccer League with the Washington Diplomats. The Diplomats finished behind the New York Cosmos in the Eastern Division of the National Conference in the 1978 season, but qualified for the play-offs, where they were beaten by the Portland Timbers. Graydon scored four goals from 26 NASL games. The club also competed in the 1978 President's Cup Football Tournament, finishing as runners-up to South Korea after a 6–2 defeat in the final at the Seoul Stadium.

He joined Oxford United in November 1978, scoring five goals from 19 matches in the 1978–79 season as the "U's" posted an 11th-place finish in the Third Division under the stewardship of Mick Brown. Bill Asprey then took United to a 17th-place finish, with Graydon contributing five goals from 19 games in 1979–80. The 1980–81 season was to prove his final one as a player, as he made only one start in the FA Cup and three substitute appearances in the league.

== Coaching career ==
After retiring as a player, Graydon worked as a coach at Southampton alongside Dave Merrington, and as assistant to Maurice Evans at Oxford United, most notably helping Oxford to the 1986 League Cup. He went on to become the youth team coach at Watford. He led them to victory in the FA Youth Cup in 1988–89, with a 2–1 victory over Manchester City; his team included David James as goalkeeper. He was given the opportunity to manage Walsall in 1989, but turned it down, with the job instead going to John Barnwell. He also went on to work as a youth team coach at Queens Park Rangers. He spent the 1997–98 season assisting John Rudge at Port Vale, helping to steer the "Valiants" away from the First Division relegation zone.

=== Walsall ===
Replacing Jan Sørensen as Walsall manager in May 1998, Graydon led Walsall to promotion out of the Second Division as runners-up behind Fulham in 1998–99. Fulham chairman Mohamed Al-Fayed had given manager Kevin Keegan £12 million to spend on Fulham, whereas Graydon spent only £30,000 to bring in Gillingham defender Richard Green. Manchester City and Reading had also spent millions, yet finished behind the "Saddlers". Walsall had been slated as one of the bookies' favourites for relegation before the season began, having finished in 19th-place in 1997–98 and selling French stars Roger Boli and Jean-François Péron. Within the League Managers Association, Graydon came behind only Alex Ferguson in the poll for Manager of the Season. He stuck to a rigid 4–4–2 system, and picked up 12 away wins operating a counter-attacking system. His best signing proved to be midfielder Darren Wrack, who came on a free transfer from Grimsby Town and went on to be voted onto the PFA Team of the Year. He also brought in left-back Neil Pointon and striker Andy Rammell. He maintained strict discipline, stressing that "fitness is absolutely vital".

"Lots of people would come in here and kick the desk because they didn't have money to spend. I knew the position and accepted what the chairman told me: that he'd make cash available if he had it. In fact, I've made him £270,000 because I've sold two at £150,000 each."

— Graydon achieved huge success at the Bescot Stadium on a small budget.

He could not keep the club in the First Division, as they were relegated at the end of the 1999–2000 season, finishing three points adrift of safety. He was named as Second Division Manager of the Month for August 2000. In the 2000–01 season, Graydon led Walsall to a fourth-place finish and then to the Second Division play-off final at the Millennium Stadium – defeating Reading 3–2 after extra time to regain promotion to the First Division at the first attempt. Instead of celebrating immediately, Graydon embraced Reading manager Alan Pardew and shook the hand of each Reading player, including former Walsall captain, Adi Viveash. His second spell in the First Division was just as unsuccessful as the first. After a dismal performance in the January Black Country derby with West Bromwich Albion, Graydon was sacked. His successor, Colin Lee, kept Walsall up at the end of the 2001–02 season.

=== Bristol Rovers ===
On 25 April 2002, Graydon returned to his hometown club to manage Bristol Rovers, who had finished second-from-bottom of the English Football League in 2001–02, warning that "if you have a sick patient then surgery is required and, in this instance, I have to administer that surgery." The following day he published his retained list, releasing 13 players from the club. He led Rovers to a 20th-place finish in the Third Division in 2002–03, before he was sacked in January 2004, with the club then in 12th-place and fans beginning to turn on him and his "negative football".

=== Later career ===
Since leaving Bristol Rovers, Graydon accompanied Howard Wilkinson to manage in China during 2004. In February 2006, Graydon was appointed as first-team coach at Leicester City by manager Rob Kelly. He left the club at the end of the 2005–06 season. In July 2009, Walsall fans voted to honour him with a star on the Birmingham Walk of Stars on Broad Street.

== Career statistics ==
=== Playing statistics ===
Appearances and goals by club, season and competition
Club	Season	League			FA Cup		Other		Total	
Club	Season	Division	Apps	Goals	Apps	Goals	Apps	Goals	Apps	Goals
Bristol Rovers	1965–66	Third Division	8	0	0	0	0	0	8	0
Bristol Rovers	1966–67	Third Division	3	0	0	0	0	0	3	0
Bristol Rovers	1967–68	Third Division	12	1	0	0	1	0	13	1
Bristol Rovers	1968–69	Third Division	28	6	7	3	1	0	36	9
Bristol Rovers	1969–70	Third Division	40	13	2	1	1	0	43	14
Bristol Rovers	1970–71	Third Division	42	13	3	0	7	1	52	14
Bristol Rovers	Total		133	33	12	4	10	1	155	38
Aston Villa	1971–72	Third Division	45	14	1	0	6	1	52	15
Aston Villa	1972–73	Second Division	32	9	1	0	4	1	37	10
Aston Villa	1973–74	Second Division	23	8	2	0	1	0	26	8
Aston Villa	1974–75	Second Division	37	19	3	2	10	6	50	27
Aston Villa	1975–76	First Division	38	12	2	1	4	1	44	14
Aston Villa	1976–77	First Division	18	6	1	0	4	1	23	7
Aston Villa	Total		193	68	10	3	29	10	232	81
Coventry City	1977–78	First Division	20	5	1	0	3	1	24	6
Washington Diplomats	1978	North American Soccer League	26	4	—		—		26	4
Oxford United	1978–79	Third Division	18	5	1	0	0	0	19	5
Oxford United	1979–80	Third Division	21	5	1	0	2	0	24	5
Oxford United	1980–81	Third Division	3	0	1	0	0	0	4	0
Oxford United	Total		42	10	3	0	2	0	47	10
Career total			414	120	26	7	44	12	484	139

=== Managerial statistics ===
Managerial record by team and tenure
Team	From	To	Record					Ref
Team	From	To	P	W	D	L	Win %	Ref
Walsall	5 May 1998	22 January 2002	199	79	49	71	39.7	
Bristol Rovers	25 April 2002	16 January 2004	81	22	22	37	27.2	
Total			280	101	71	108	36.1	

== Honours ==
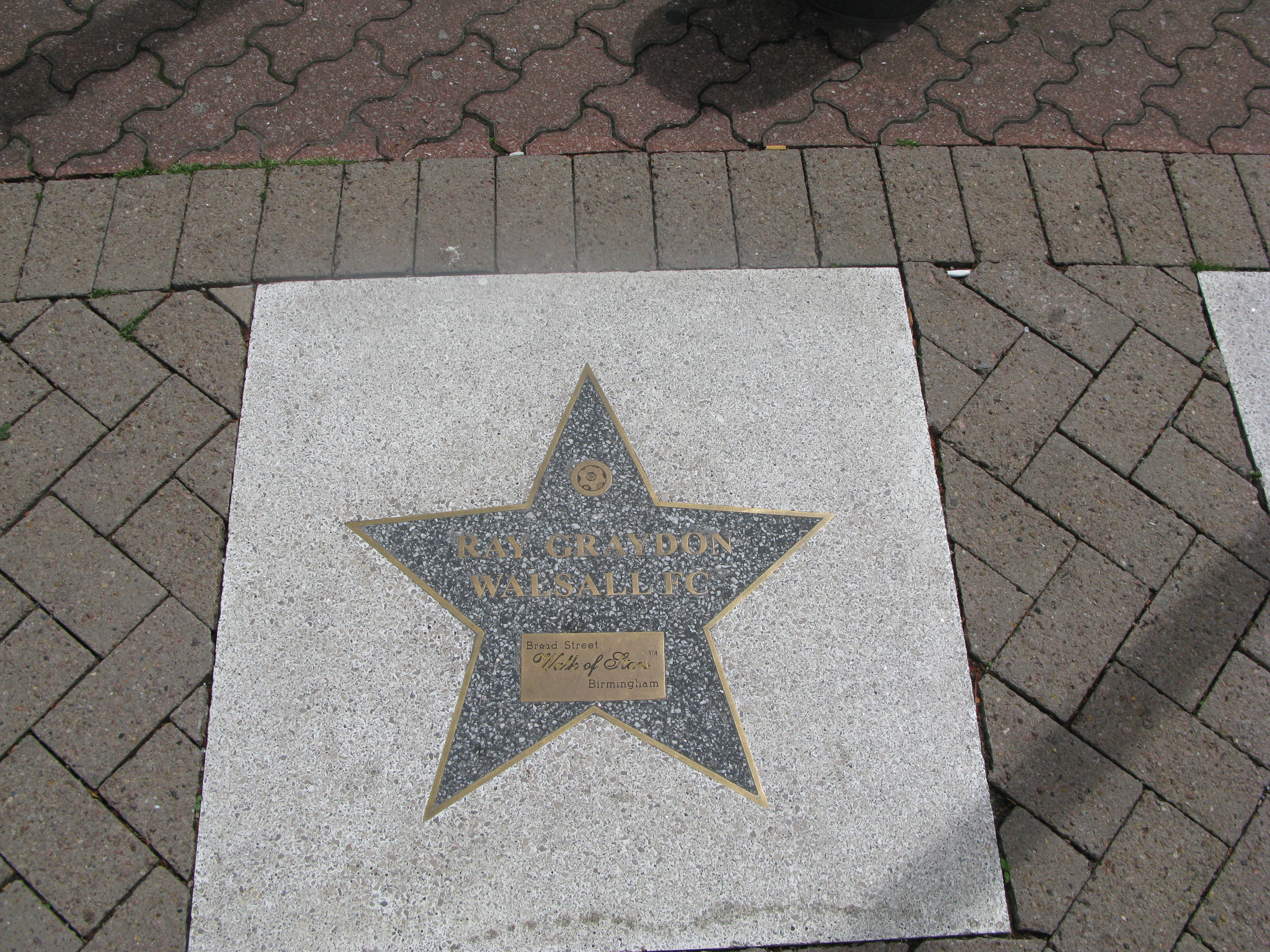
Pavement Plaque on Broad Street

=== Player ===
Aston Villa

- Football League Third Division: 1971–72
- Football League Second Division second-place promotion: 1974–75
- Football League Cup: 1974–75, 1976–77

Washington Diplomats

- President's Cup Football Tournament runner-up: 1978

Individual

- PFA Team of the Year: 1974–75 Second Division

=== Manager ===
Walsall

- Football League Second Division second-place promotion: 1998–99
- Football League Second Division play-offs: 2001

Individual

- Football League Second Division Manager of the Month: August 2000
