= 1975 Football League Cup final =

- Event: 1974–75 Football League Cup
Aston Villa	Norwich City
1	0
- Date: 1 March 1975
- Venue: Wembley Stadium, London
- Referee: Gordon Hill
- Attendance: 95,946

The 1975 Football League Cup final took place on 1 March 1975 at the old Wembley Stadium. It was contested between Aston Villa and Norwich City. To date it is the only major domestic cup final played at Wembley Stadium between two clubs outside the top-flight (although both teams were promoted at the end of the season).

In one of the high-lights of their season, Aston Villa won 1–0, to claim their second League Cup final victory. Ray Graydon scored the only goal of the game, following up after goalkeeper Kevin Keelan had saved his penalty onto the post.

The victorious Aston Villa manager, Ron Saunders, appeared in his third successive League Cup final with his third different club, having been a losing manager with Norwich City in 1973 and Manchester City in 1974.

== Match details ==
1 March 1975

Aston Villa	1–0	Norwich City
Graydon 81'

Wembley Stadium, London
Attendance: 95,946
Referee: Gordon Hill

Aston Villa	Norwich City

GK	1	(England) Jim Cumbes
RB	2	(England) John Robson
LB	3	(Scotland) Charlie Aitken
CB	4	(Scotland) Ian Ross (c)
CB	5	(Northern Ireland) Chris Nicholl
MF	6	(Scotland) Bobby McDonald
RW	7	(England) Ray Graydon
FW	8	(England) Brian Little
CF	9	(England) Keith Leonard
MF	10	(England) Chico Hamilton
MF	11	(England) Frank Carrodus
Substitute:
FW	12	(England) Alun Evans
Manager:
(England) Ron Saunders

GK	1	(England) Kevin Keelan
RB	2	(England) Mel Machin
LB	3	(England) Colin Sullivan
MF	4	(England) Peter Morris
CB	5	(Scotland) Duncan Forbes (c)
CB	6	(England) Dave Stringer
RW	7	(England) Johnny Miller
CF	8	(Scotland) Ted MacDougall
CF	9	(England) Phil Boyer
MF	10	(England) Colin Suggett
LW	11	(England) Tony Powell
Substitute:
MF	12	(Scotland) Billy Steele
Manager:
(England) John Bond

== Road to Wembley ==
=== Aston Villa ===
Home teams listed first.

Round 2: Aston Villa 1–1 Everton

Round 2 Replay: Everton 0–3 Aston Villa

Round 3: Crewe Alexandra 2–2 Aston Villa

Round 3 Replay: Aston Villa 1–0 Crewe Alexandra

Round 4: Hartlepool United 1–1 Aston Villa

Round 4 Replay: Aston Villa 6–1 Hartlepool United

Round 5: Colchester United 1–2 Aston Villa

Semi-final, 1st leg: Chester 2–2 Aston Villa

Semi-final, 2nd leg: Aston Villa 3–2 Chester

=== Norwich City ===
Home teams listed first.

Round 2: Bolton Wanderers 0–0 Norwich City

Round 2 Replay: Norwich City 3–1 Bolton Wanderers

Round 3: West Bromwich Albion 1–1 Norwich City

Round 3 Replay: Norwich City 2–0 West Bromwich Albion

Round 4: Sheffield United 2–2 Norwich City

Round 4 Replay: Norwich City 2–1 Sheffield United

Round 5: Norwich City 1–1 Ipswich Town

Round 5 Replay: Ipswich Town 1–2 Norwich City

Semi-final, 1st leg: Manchester United 2–2 Norwich City

Semi-final, 2nd leg Norwich City 1–0 Manchester United
