= Keith Leonard =

English footballer (born 1950)

Personal information
- Full name: Keith Andrew Leonard
- Date of birth: 10 November 1950 (age 75)
- Place of birth: Birmingham, England
- Height: 6 ft 1 in (1.85 m)
- Position: Striker

Youth career
- Kidderminster Harriers
- Darlaston
- Highgate United

Senior career*
Years	Team	Apps	(Gls)
1972–1976	Aston Villa	38	(11)
1973–1974	→ Port Vale (loan)	13	(1)
Total		51	(12)

Managerial career
- 1986: Birmingham City (caretaker)
- * Club domestic league appearances and goals

Keith Andrew Leonard (born 10 November 1950) is an English former professional footballer who played as a striker for Aston Villa. He also played on loan at Port Vale. He played non-League football for Kidderminster Harriers, Darlaston, and Highgate United. He won the League Cup with Villa in 1975, and was also promoted out of the Second Division. He later became a coach and led the Aston Villa youth team players to FA Youth Cup victory in 1980; he later served Birmingham City as caretaker manager in 1986.

== Playing career ==
Born in Birmingham, Leonard worked as a draughtsman whilst playing non-League football with Highgate United before he joined Aston Villa in April 1972. He made his debut against Fulham but after just a few appearances fractured his right leg in two places in a road accident on Boxing Day 1972. After recovering from his injuries he spent a few months on loan to Port Vale to regain fitness. Arriving at Vale Park in November 1973, he scored once in 13 Third Division appearances, and his performances persuaded the club to offer Villa £5,000 for his services permanently. The bid failed and he returned to Villa Park in February 1974. "Valiants" manager Roy Sproson doubled the offer in September 1974 but was again rebuffed.

On his return he played alongside Brian Little in their 1974–75 Second Division promotion campaign and in the 1975 League Cup final 1–0 victory over Norwich City at Wembley. A knee injury forced his retirement in 1976 and prompted manager Ron Saunders to sign Andy Gray from Dundee United as his replacement.

== Coaching career ==
Leonard took up coaching under Saunders at Aston Villa and led the youth team to victory in the FA Youth Cup in 1980. When Saunders joined Birmingham City in 1982, he appointed Leonard as first-team coach.

After Saunders' resignation in 1986, Leonard acted as Birmingham's caretaker manager for one game before being dismissed when John Bond was appointed as Saunders' permanent successor. He went on to coach at West Bromwich Albion before leaving football to work at the Land Rover plant in Solihull.

== Career statistics ==
Appearances and goals by club, season and competition
Club	Season	League			FA Cup		League Cup		Total	
Club	Season	Division	Apps	Goals	Apps	Goals	Apps	Goals	Apps	Goals
Aston Villa	1972–73	Second Division	2	0	0	0	0	0	2	0
Aston Villa	1973–74	Second Division	7	1	0	0	0	0	7	1
Aston Villa	1974–75	Second Division	22	7	3	2	5	3	30	12
Aston Villa	1975–76	First Division	7	3	0	0	1	1	8	4
Aston Villa	Total		38	11	3	2	6	4	47	17
Port Vale (loan)	1973–74	Third Division	13	1	0	0	0	0	13	1
Career total			51	12	3	2	6	4	60	18

== Honours ==
=== Player ===
Aston Villa

- Football League Second Division second-place promotion: 1974–75
- Football League Cup: 1974–75

=== Youth team coach ===
Aston Villa

- FA Youth Cup: 1980
