= Mel Machin =

English footballer and manager

Personal information
- Full name: Melvyn Machin
- Date of birth: 16 April 1945 (age 81)
- Place of birth: Newcastle-under-Lyme, England
- Height: 5 ft 10 in (1.78 m)
- Positions: Midfielder; inside forward

Youth career
- Port Vale

Senior career*
Years	Team	Apps	(Gls)
1962–1966	Port Vale	30	(6)
1966–1970	Gillingham	157	(11)
1970–1974	AFC Bournemouth	110	(7)
1974–1978	Norwich City	96	(4)
1977	→ Seattle Sounders (loan)	19	(0)
Total		412	(28)

Managerial career
- 1987–1989: Manchester City
- 1989–1993: Barnsley
- 1994–2000: AFC Bournemouth
- 2000–2002: AFC Bournemouth (Director of football)
- 2003: Huddersfield Town (caretaker)
- * Club domestic league appearances and goals

Melvyn Machin (born 16 April 1945) is an English former football player and manager.

A midfielder, he started his career at Port Vale in 1962 before he moved on to Gillingham four years later. He made his name at the club from 1966 to 1970 before he transferred to Bournemouth & Boscombe Athletic for three years. In 1974, he signed with Norwich City, also playing on loan at American club Seattle Sounders, before he retired in 1978 – he was later voted into Norwich City's Hall of Fame in 2002.

Appointed manager of Manchester City in 1987, he won them promotion out of the Second Division in 1988–89, before he left to take up the reins at Barnsley. In September 1994, he was appointed manager at Bournemouth, where he would remain for the next six years, managing them to a Football League Trophy final in 1998. He later served Bournemouth as Director of football between 2000 and 2002 before briefly managing Huddersfield Town in 2003.

== Playing career ==
Despite being a Stoke City fan, Machin started his playing career at nearby Port Vale, signing professional forms in July 1962. He made the odd appearance from October 1962 to 1964, after which he started appearing rather more frequently. He was not a favourite with Stanley Matthews or trainer Lol Hamlett as he had a habit of talking back to the pair, so he put in a transfer request in 1966. In all competitions he made 32 appearances, scoring 6 goals, being utilised mostly as an inside-forward.

In July 1966, he joined Gillingham, where he attained regular first-team football. After 156 league matches and 11 goals, Machin was signed in 1970 by Bournemouth & Boscombe Athletic, at the time managed by John Bond.

His spell at Bournemouth ended after 110 appearances in December 1973, when he followed Bond to Norwich City, despite interest from Tottenham Hotspur and Crystal Palace. Converted to a full-back role, Machin played 117 appearances and scored four times for the club. He conceded a penalty in the 1975 League Cup final defeat to Aston Villa at Wembley Stadium, handling on the line to prevent a headed goal from Chris Nicholl. After problems with injuries he finished his career in 1978, following a brief spell in the NASL with Seattle Sounders, in which time he was named in the NASL All-Stars team.

== Coaching and managerial career ==
After retiring as a player, Norwich then invited him to join their coaching set-up. He worked as youth team and reserve team coach and was then promoted to chief coach before being appointed as assistant to manager Ken Brown. The partnership finished in May 1987, when he accepted an offer to manage Manchester City.

After two seasons in charge, he got the club promoted to Division One with a young and promising squad. In the first season in the top-flight, his team beat local rivals Manchester United by 5–1 on 23 September 1989, in what Alex Ferguson described as the lowest point of his career. Despite the victory, two months later, on 27 November, Machin was sacked by chairman Peter Swales as the club was bottom of the division. He became Barnsley manager on 29 December but resigned on 5 May 1993, as he was disillusioned with the club policy of selling their best players to make ends meet.

Machin then worked as a scout for West Ham United, Tottenham Hotspur and Liverpool before he was appointed manager of Bournemouth in September 1994. In his first season at the helm he managed to keep the club in the Second Division despite a start with seven consecutive defeats and a serious financial crisis, this feat later became known as "The Great Escape". In 1998, Bournemouth lost to Grimsby Town in the Football League Trophy final in their first ever Wembley appearance. In August 2000, he became director of football role and later retired on 29 August 2002, having had his testimonial match the previous month. It was in his testimonial – a 3–2 victory for Manchester United, that United's £29.3 million signing Rio Ferdinand made his debut. In October 2002 he was linked to the vacant management position at Swindon Town.

On 28 January 2003, Machin came out of retirement to assist Mick Wadsworth at the helm of Huddersfield Town. At the time, Huddersfield were in dire straits, not only were they propping up Division Two, they were also in atrocious financial trouble which had seen the club attempt to sack Wadsworth only to reinstate him as they couldn't afford to pay him off. Two months later, Wadsworth for sacked for good and Machin was appointed caretaker manager, tasked with trying to keep the club in the division. While he picked up some vital results, including a 4-0 win over Chesterfield, a 1-0 win away at Swindon Town and a vital 0-0 draw with champions-elect Wigan Athletic, the club were relegated following a 5-1 battering away at Port Vale, which confirmed relegation. Only on a weekly contract, and with the club in administration, Machin and Huddersfield parted ways at the end of the season after he failing to avoid relegation to the Third Division.

== Career statistics ==
=== Playing statistics ===
Appearances and goals by club, season and competition
Club	Season	League			FA Cup		League Cup		Total	
Club	Season	Division	Apps	Goals	Apps	Goals	Apps	Goals	Apps	Goals
Port Vale	1962–63	Third Division	1	0	0	0	0	0	1	0
Port Vale	1963–64	Third Division	0	0	0	0	0	0	0	0
Port Vale	1964–65	Third Division	11	4	1	0	0	0	12	4
Port Vale	1965–66	Fourth Division	18	2	1	0	0	0	19	2
Port Vale	Total		30	6	2	0	0	0	32	6
Gillingham	1966–67	Third Division	42	4	2	0	5	0	49	4
Gillingham	1967–68	Third Division	32	5	1	0	0	0	33	5
Gillingham	1968–69	Third Division	31	1	2	0	2	0	35	1
Gillingham	1969–70	Third Division	44	1	6	1	1	0	51	2
Gillingham	1970–71	Third Division	8	0	1	0	0	0	9	0
Gillingham	Total		157	11	12	1	8	0	177	12
AFC Bournemouth	1970–71	Fourth Division	22	0	0	0	0	0	22	0
AFC Bournemouth	1971–72	Third Division	34	1	3	1	1	0	38	2
AFC Bournemouth	1972–73	Third Division	36	5	4	0	4	0	44	5
AFC Bournemouth	1973–74	Third Division	18	1	1	0	3	0	22	1
AFC Bournemouth	Total		110	7	8	1	8	0	126	8
Norwich City	1973–74	First Division	15	0	0	0	0	0	15	0
Norwich City	1974–75	Second Division	24	3	1	0	11	0	36	3
Norwich City	1975–76	First Division	28	0	4	0	6	0	38	0
Norwich City	1976–77	First Division	26	1	1	0	4	0	31	1
Norwich City	1977–78	First Division	3	0	0	0	0	0	3	0
Norwich City	Total		96	4	6	0	21	0	123	4
Seattle Sounders (loan)	1977	NASL	19	0	—		—		19	0
Career total			412	28	28	2	37	0	477	30

=== Managerial statistics ===
Team	From	To	Record				
Team	From	To	G	W	D	L	Win %
Manchester City	31 May 1987	29 November 1989	130	59	27	44	45.38
Barnsley	1 December 1989	5 May 1993	192	66	51	75	34.38
AFC Bournemouth	1 September 1994	18 August 2000	327	120	84	123	36.70
Huddersfield Town (caretaker)	26 March 2003	6 May 2003	7	2	2	3	28.57
Total			656	247	164	245	37.65

== Honours ==
=== As a player ===
Norwich City

- Football League Cup runner-up: 1974–75

Individual

- PFA Team of the Year: 1973–74 Third Division
- NASL All-Stars: 1977

=== As a manager ===
Manchester City

- Football League Second Division second-place promotion: 1988–89

Bournemouth

- Football League Trophy runner-up: 1997–98
