= 1974–75 in English football =

Football in England
- Season: 1974–75

Men's football
- First Division: Derby County
- Second Division: Manchester United
- Third Division: Blackburn Rovers
- Fourth Division: Mansfield Town
- FA Cup: West Ham United
- League Cup: Aston Villa
- Charity Shield: Liverpool

The 1974–75 season was the 95th season of competitive football in England.

== Diary of the season ==
4 July 1974: Don Revie accepts the offer from The Football Association to become the new manager of the England national football team, ending thirteen years as manager of Leeds United, the defending league champions.

12 July 1974: Bill Shankly stuns Liverpool by announcing his retirement after fifteen years as manager. He is to be succeeded by 55-year-old coach Bob Paisley.

30 July 1974: Leeds United's search for a new manager ends with the appointment of Brian Clough, who had managed Third Division side Brighton & Hove Albion since November after his controversial dismissal from Derby County, the side he managed to title glory in 1972. However, he is not joined at Elland Road by his long serving assistant Peter Taylor, who is promoted to the manager's seat at the Goldstone Ground.

10 August 1974: This year's FA Charity Shield is played at Wembley Stadium between league champions Leeds United and FA Cup holders Liverpool, both sides having appointed new managers for the first time in over a decade. The match ends in a 1–1 draw and Liverpool win 6–5 on penalties, but it is marred by the dismissal of Leeds captain Billy Bremner and Liverpool striker Kevin Keegan.

17 August 1974: The First Division season begins. Clough's first League match in charge of Leeds ends in a 3–0 defeat to Stoke City. Carlisle United, in the First Division for the first time in their history, win 2–0 at Chelsea, and Manchester City beat West Ham United 4–0. Manchester United play their first game outside the top flight since 1938, beating Orient 2–0 at Brisbane Road in the opening Second Division fixture. Football hooliganism was rife at the Orient match, with reports of clashes between United supporters and police, damaged Underground trains and fighting in the ground.

24 August 1974: Carlisle United move to the top of the league after winning their first three games in the First Division. In the Second Division, Old Trafford hosts its first Second Division game in 36 years as Manchester United beat Millwall 4–0, with Gerry Daly scoring a hat-trick and Stuart Pearson scoring the other goal.

29 August 1974: Following a poor start to the season and a 2–1 defeat by Manchester City at White Hart Lane, longtime Tottenham Hotspur manager Bill Nicholson resigns, citing burnout and the growing rift between him and younger players.

31 August 1974: At the end of August, Liverpool have gained the lead of the First Division under new manager Bob Paisley, one point ahead of Ipswich Town, Everton and Manchester City, whose 2–1 defeat of Leeds United leaves the champions just one point off the bottom.

12 September 1974: Brian Clough is sacked after 44 days and six league matches in charge of Leeds United, who have won just once in the league and stand 19th of 22 clubs in the First Division. He receives a pay-off in the region of £98,000.

14 September 1974: Leeds United lose 2–1 to Burnley in their first match after the departure of Brian Clough.

30 September 1974: With eight wins from their first ten games, Ipswich Town top the First Division table at the end of September. They lead Manchester City by two points. At the bottom, Queens Park Rangers, Tottenham Hotspur, Arsenal and Leeds United are level on points.

4 October 1974: After nearly a month, Leeds United finally appoint a successor to Brian Clough by naming Jimmy Armfield of Bolton Wanderers as their new manager.

5 October 1974: Leeds United beat Arsenal 2–0 at Elland Road to send the Gunners, who have been in the First Division since 1919, to the bottom of the table.

22 October 1974: Don Revie's first England squad is announced, featuring six U23 players without full senior caps: Kevin Beattie of Ipswich Town, Middlesbrough's Willie Maddren, Birmingham City forward Trevor Francis, Stoke City's Alan Hudson and QPR pair Gerry Francis and Dave Thomas.

30 October 1974: England beat Czechoslovakia 3–0 at Wembley in a European Championship qualifier, Don Revie's first match as manager.

31 October 1974: Liverpool regain top spot in the First Division at the end of the month, one point ahead of Manchester City. Arsenal and Tottenham Hotspur continue to struggle in the relegation zone, where they have been joined by Luton Town.

9 November 1974: Manchester City take over at the top of the First Division as Liverpool lose 3–1 at home to Arsenal.

20 November 1974: England are held to a goalless draw by Portugal in their second 1976 European Championship qualifier.

30 November 1974: Stoke City beat Leicester City 1–0 to move to the top of the First Division, but just three points separate the top nine clubs. Carlisle United's early form has deserted them, and they now lie in the relegation zone with Luton Town and Chelsea.

7 December 1974: Manchester United come back from being 3–1 down against Sheffield Wednesday to draw 4–4. An eight-man on-pitch "brawl" breaks out in the match between Carlisle United and Arsenal.

11 December 1974: Derby County's UEFA Cup campaign is ended at the third round stage by Velež, leaving Leeds United as Britain's only club still in any of the European competitions. Newcastle United retain the Texaco Cup after beating ten-man Southampton 3–1 on aggregate.

18 December 1974: Fourth Division Chester reach the semi-finals of the League Cup after beating Newcastle United 1–0 in a replay. Middlesbrough lose 3–0 to Manchester United, leaving no First Division clubs in the competition.

31 December 1974: At the end of the year, the race for the First Division title remains remarkably close, with five points separating the top thirteen teams. Ipswich Town lead the table, alongside last year's Second Division champions Middlesbrough. Chelsea have moved out of the relegation zone at the expense of Leicester City.

4 January 1975: Isthmian League Leatherhead reach the fourth round of the FA Cup by beating Brighton & Hove Albion 1–0. They are joined by Southern League side Wimbledon, who win 1–0 away to First Division Burnley. Non-league Altrincham and Wycombe Wanderers hold First Division opponents, Everton and Middlesbrough respectively, to draws.

7 January 1975: Third Division underdogs Walsall knock Manchester United out of the FA Cup by winning the third round replay 3–2 at Fellows Park, three days after the first match at Old Trafford ended in a goalless draw.

11 January 1975: Ipswich beat high-flying Middlesbrough and register their fifteenth win of the season to go top of the First Division, but seven other clubs are within three points of the Suffolk club. Everton, in second, put three past bottom club Leicester without reply, and sit one point off the lead. Division Two leaders Manchester United open up a six-point gap at the summit with a victory over Sheffield Wednesday, while Sunderland in second are beaten by lowly Portsmouth.

18 January 1975: Everton, who have lost just three League games so far, take over leadership of the First Division with a 3–0 win over Birmingham City. Ipswich Town and Burnley are one point behind.

22 January 1975: Aston Villa and Norwich City complete aggregate victories in their League Cup semi-finals over Chester and Manchester United respectively.

25 January 1975: Wimbledon hold Leeds United to a 0–0 draw at Elland Road in the FA Cup fourth round. Leatherhead's run comes to an end with a 3–2 defeat to Leicester City. FA Cup holders Liverpool are knocked out of this season's competition 1–0 by Ipswich Town. Walsall's FA Cup run continues with a 1–0 home win over last season's runners-up Newcastle United.

10 February 1975: Wimbledon's FA Cup run finally ends in the fourth round replay with a 1–0 defeat to Leeds United.

15 February 1975: Walsall's FA Cup run comes to an end in the fifth round when they lose 1–0 at Birmingham City.

28 February 1975: At the end of February, the destination of the League title is no clearer, as five points separate the top half of the First Division, which Everton led by one point from Stoke City and Burnley. Carlisle United have dropped to last place, one point behind Luton Town and Leicester City.

1 March 1975: Aston Villa beat Norwich City 1–0 in the all-Second Division final of the League Cup at Wembley, ending their 14-year wait for a major trophy which began when they won the first ever League Cup.

8 March 1975: Second Division Fulham beat Carlisle United 1–0 in the FA Cup quarter-finals. West Ham United and Birmingham City join them in the last four.

12 March 1975: England beat world champions West Germany 2–0 in a friendly in their 100th international at Wembley.

15 March 1975: Wolverhampton Wanderers beat Chelsea 7–1 in the biggest win of the First Division season. Ipswich Town beat Newcastle United 5–4, but Everton now lead the table by three points from Burnley with a game in hand.

27 March 1975: After three draws, Ipswich Town beat Leeds United 3–2 in the third replay of their FA Cup quarter-final at Filbert Street.

29 March 1975: Everton suffer a 3–0 defeat away to bottom-placed Carlisle United, and relinquish top spot in the First Division to Liverpool.

31 March 1975: Everton beat Coventry City 1–0 to move back to the top of the table, as Liverpool lose 2–0 to Stoke City. They lead Liverpool and Stoke by one point with a game in hand, and have just five matches remaining, but Ipswich Town, Derby County and Middlesbrough also remain in contention. Tottenham Hotspur have slipped back into the relegation zone alongside Carlisle United and Luton Town.

5 April 1975: Both FA Cup semi-finals, Birmingham City versus Fulham and Ipswich Town versus West Ham United, require replays after ending in draws. In the Second Division, Manchester United win 1–0 at Southampton (who went down with them last season) to seal an instant return to the First Division.

9 April 1975: Everton lose 2–1 to relegation-threatened Luton Town, and Derby County take advantage by beating Wolverhampton Wanderers 1–0 to move two points clear at the top of the table with three matches left. West Ham United and Fulham reach the FA Cup final after narrow victories in their semi-final replays.

12 April 1975: Stoke City's title challenge ends with defeat to Sheffield United, leaving Derby County, Liverpool, Everton and Ipswich Town as the remaining contenders. Carlisle United are relegated after losing at Anfield.

16 April 1975: Malcolm Macdonald scores all five goals as England beat Cyprus 5–0 in a European Championship qualifier. He is the first England player for 37 years to achieve this feat.

19 April 1975: Liverpool, Everton and Ipswich Town all lose to hand the initiative in the title race to Derby County. Although the Rams can only draw with Leicester City, only Ipswich can now prevent them from winning their second title in four seasons. At the bottom, Tottenham Hotspur beat Chelsea 2–0 in a vital relegation clash.

23 April 1975: Derby County win the title after Ipswich Town can only draw 1–1 with Manchester City.

26 April 1975: Derby County lie two points clear at the top at the end of the season after drawing their last match against Carlisle United. Liverpool finish ahead of Ipswich Town in second on goal average, with Everton fourth. Chelsea's 1–1 draw with Everton sees them relegated, and Tottenham Hotspur slip into the relegation zone after losing the North London derby to Arsenal. They must take a point from their final match to stay in the First Division.

28 April 1975: Tottenham Hotspur beat Leeds United 4–2 to survive in the First Division and relegate Luton Town one year after promotion.

3 May 1975: West Ham United win the FA Cup at the end of their first season under the management of John Lyall, beating Fulham 2–0 at Wembley in the final with two goals from Alan Taylor.

11 May 1975: England beat Cyprus 1–0 to move three points clear at the top of their European Championship qualifying group.

24 May 1975: England win the Home Championship by thrashing Scotland 5–1 at Wembley.

28 May 1975: Leeds United are beaten 2–0 by West German side Bayern Munich in the European Cup final in Paris. Peter Lorimer has a goal disallowed, which sparks a furious pitch invasion and rioting by a section of Leeds fans.

== UEFA competitions ==
1973–74 League champions Leeds United reached the European Cup final at the Parc des Princes in Paris, where they lost 2–0 to Bayern Munich. Leeds fans ran riot following the match, in which Peter Lorimer had a goal disallowed, and the club was banned from European competition for four years, later reduced to two on appeal.

== FA Cup ==
John Lyall kicked off his management career in style by guiding West Ham United to FA Cup glory over Fulham at Wembley. On the losing Fulham side was former West Ham captain Bobby Moore.

== League Cup ==
Ron Saunders guided Aston Villa to League Cup success against Norwich City in the only final of the competition between two Second Division teams. Both clubs were also promoted to the First Division at the end of the season.

Fourth Division side Chester reached the semi-finals after accounting for top-flight giants Leeds United and Newcastle United. They lost the semi-final to Aston Villa 5–4 on aggregate. Manchester United, also of the Second Division, lost the other semi-final.

== Football League ==
=== First Division ===
Derby County won the First Division title for the second time in four seasons, in their first full season under the management of Dave Mackay. Liverpool finished runners-up under Bob Paisley, who had been promoted to the manager's seat from the coaching staff following Bill Shankly's retirement a month before the start of the season. Ipswich Town enjoyed their best finish since being champions in 1962. Everton lost just eight games during the season, the fewest of any side in the league that season, but a poor run of form at the end of the season cost Billy Bingham's side league glory.

With Don Revie now in charge of the England team, Leeds United made a dismal start to the season under Brian Clough, who was sacked after just 44 days in charge. His successor Jimmy Armfield steered Leeds to a ninth-place finish and to their first European Cup final, which they lost to Bayern Munich. West Ham United compensated for a disappointing season in the league by winning the FA Cup. It was a disappointing season in North London as Arsenal finished 16th and Tottenham finished 19th.

Carlisle United had incredibly topped the First Division in late August after winning their first three games in the top flight, but failed to keep up their good form and finished the season relegated in bottom place. Luton Town also went straight back down. Financially troubled Chelsea, plagued by falling attendances and rising debts, were also relegated.

| Pos | Team | Pld | W | D | L | GF | GA | GAv | Pts | Qualification or relegation |
|---|---|---|---|---|---|---|---|---|---|---|
| 1 | Derby County (C) | 42 | 21 | 11 | 10 | 67 | 49 | 1.367 | 53 | Qualification for the European Cup first round |
| 2 | Liverpool | 42 | 20 | 11 | 11 | 60 | 39 | 1.538 | 51 | Qualification for the UEFA Cup first round |
| 3 | Ipswich Town | 42 | 23 | 5 | 14 | 66 | 44 | 1.500 | 51 | Qualification for the UEFA Cup first round |
| 4 | Everton | 42 | 16 | 18 | 8 | 56 | 42 | 1.333 | 50 | Qualification for the UEFA Cup first round |
| 5 | Stoke City | 42 | 17 | 15 | 10 | 64 | 48 | 1.333 | 49 | |
| 6 | Sheffield United | 42 | 18 | 13 | 11 | 58 | 51 | 1.137 | 49 | |
| 7 | Middlesbrough | 42 | 18 | 12 | 12 | 54 | 40 | 1.350 | 48 | |
| 8 | Manchester City | 42 | 18 | 10 | 14 | 54 | 54 | 1.000 | 46 | |
| 9 | Leeds United | 42 | 16 | 13 | 13 | 57 | 49 | 1.163 | 45 | |
| 10 | Burnley | 42 | 17 | 11 | 14 | 68 | 67 | 1.015 | 45 | |
| 11 | Queens Park Rangers | 42 | 16 | 10 | 16 | 54 | 54 | 1.000 | 42 | |
| 12 | Wolverhampton Wanderers | 42 | 14 | 11 | 17 | 57 | 54 | 1.056 | 39 | |
| 13 | West Ham United | 42 | 13 | 13 | 16 | 58 | 59 | 0.983 | 39 | Qualification for the European Cup Winners' Cup first round (Note: West Ham United qualified for the European Cup Winners' Cup as the 1974-75 FA Cup winners.) |
| 14 | Coventry City | 42 | 12 | 15 | 15 | 51 | 62 | 0.823 | 39 | |
| 15 | Newcastle United | 42 | 15 | 9 | 18 | 59 | 72 | 0.819 | 39 | |
| 16 | Arsenal | 42 | 13 | 11 | 18 | 47 | 49 | 0.959 | 37 | |
| 17 | Birmingham City | 42 | 14 | 9 | 19 | 53 | 61 | 0.869 | 37 | |
| 18 | Leicester City | 42 | 12 | 12 | 18 | 46 | 60 | 0.767 | 36 | |
| 19 | Tottenham Hotspur | 42 | 13 | 8 | 21 | 52 | 63 | 0.825 | 34 | |
| 20 | Luton Town (R) | 42 | 11 | 11 | 20 | 47 | 65 | 0.723 | 33 | Relegation to the Second Division |
| 21 | Chelsea (R) | 42 | 9 | 15 | 18 | 42 | 72 | 0.583 | 33 | Relegation to the Second Division |
| 22 | Carlisle United (R) | 42 | 12 | 5 | 25 | 43 | 59 | 0.729 | 29 | Relegation to the Second Division |

Source: World Football
Rules for classification: 1) Points; 2) Goal average; 3) Goals scored
(C) Champions; (R) Relegated

=== Second Division ===
Manchester United kept faith in manager Tommy Docherty after their relegation to the Second Division and sealed an instant return to the First Division by winning the Second Division title. FIFA finally lifted George Best's worldwide ban from football, but Manchester United manager Tommy Docherty was not prepared to give him another chance at Old Trafford, and he joined Stockport County on a free transfer.

Norwich City also sealed an instant return to the First Division by finished third. Also going up were runners-up Aston Villa, who took the League Cup up with them and ended their eight-year exile from the First Division.

Sunderland, the 1973 FA Cup winners, just missed out on promotion, as did Bristol City. Don Howe paid for a second failure to take West Bromwich Albion back into the First Division and was replaced as manager by veteran player Johnny Giles. Nottingham Forest, battling against a second relegation in three seasons, turned to Brian Clough in hope of turning the club around, and the turnaround started with Clough guiding them to Second Division survival.

Cardiff City and Millwall were relegated to the Third Division, along with Sheffield Wednesday, who would be playing Third Division football for the first time in their history.

| Pos | Team | Pld | W | D | L | GF | GA | GAv | Pts | Qualification or relegation |
|---|---|---|---|---|---|---|---|---|---|---|
| 1 | Manchester United (C, P) | 42 | 26 | 9 | 7 | 66 | 30 | 2.200 | 61 | Promotion to the First Division |
| 2 | Aston Villa (P) | 42 | 25 | 8 | 9 | 79 | 32 | 2.469 | 58 | UEFA Cup first round and promotion to the First Division |
| 3 | Norwich City (P) | 42 | 20 | 13 | 9 | 58 | 37 | 1.568 | 53 | Promotion to the First Division |
| 4 | Sunderland | 42 | 19 | 13 | 10 | 65 | 35 | 1.857 | 51 | |
| 5 | Bristol City | 42 | 21 | 8 | 13 | 47 | 33 | 1.424 | 50 | |
| 6 | West Bromwich Albion | 42 | 18 | 9 | 15 | 54 | 42 | 1.286 | 45 | |
| 7 | Blackpool | 42 | 14 | 17 | 11 | 38 | 33 | 1.152 | 45 | |
| 8 | Hull City | 42 | 15 | 14 | 13 | 40 | 53 | 0.755 | 44 | |
| 9 | Fulham | 42 | 13 | 16 | 13 | 44 | 39 | 1.128 | 42 | |
| 10 | Bolton Wanderers | 42 | 15 | 12 | 15 | 45 | 41 | 1.098 | 42 | |
| 11 | Oxford United | 42 | 15 | 12 | 15 | 41 | 51 | 0.804 | 42 | |
| 12 | Orient | 42 | 11 | 20 | 11 | 28 | 39 | 0.718 | 42 | |
| 13 | Southampton | 42 | 15 | 11 | 16 | 53 | 54 | 0.981 | 41 | |
| 14 | Notts County | 42 | 12 | 16 | 14 | 49 | 59 | 0.831 | 40 | |
| 15 | York City | 42 | 14 | 10 | 18 | 51 | 55 | 0.927 | 38 | |
| 16 | Nottingham Forest | 42 | 12 | 14 | 16 | 43 | 55 | 0.782 | 38 | |
| 17 | Portsmouth | 42 | 12 | 13 | 17 | 44 | 54 | 0.815 | 37 | |
| 18 | Oldham Athletic | 42 | 10 | 15 | 17 | 40 | 48 | 0.833 | 35 | |
| 19 | Bristol Rovers | 42 | 12 | 11 | 19 | 42 | 64 | 0.656 | 35 | |
| 20 | Millwall (R) | 42 | 10 | 12 | 20 | 44 | 56 | 0.786 | 32 | Relegation to the Third Division |
| 21 | Cardiff City (R) | 42 | 9 | 14 | 19 | 36 | 62 | 0.581 | 32 | Relegation to the Third Division |
| 22 | Sheffield Wednesday (R) | 42 | 5 | 11 | 26 | 29 | 64 | 0.453 | 21 | Relegation to the Third Division |

Rules for classification: 1) Points; 2) Goal average; 3) Goals scored
(C) Champions; (P) Promoted; (R) Relegated

=== Third Division ===
Blackburn Rovers won their first promotion in nearly twenty years when they sealed the Third Division title to climb back into the Second Division after four seasons away. Plymouth Argyle finished a point behind them as runners-up, with Charlton Athletic sealing the final promotion place. Swindon Town missed out on promotion by two points. Crystal Palace finally enjoyed some good form after two successive relegations, but fifth place was not enough for promotion.

Huddersfield Town, who had become the first English team to win three successive league titles back in the 1920s, went down to the Fourth Division with a third relegation in four seasons. They went down with Watford, Tranmere Rovers and Bournemouth.

| Pos | Team | Pld | W | D | L | GF | GA | GAv | Pts | Qualification or relegation |
|---|---|---|---|---|---|---|---|---|---|---|
| 1 | Blackburn Rovers (C, P) | 46 | 22 | 16 | 8 | 68 | 45 | 1.511 | 60 | Promotion to the Second Division |
| 2 | Plymouth Argyle (P) | 46 | 24 | 11 | 11 | 79 | 58 | 1.362 | 59 | Promotion to the Second Division |
| 3 | Charlton Athletic (P) | 46 | 22 | 11 | 13 | 76 | 61 | 1.246 | 55 | Promotion to the Second Division |
| 4 | Swindon Town | 46 | 21 | 11 | 14 | 64 | 58 | 1.103 | 53 | |
| 5 | Crystal Palace | 46 | 18 | 15 | 13 | 66 | 57 | 1.158 | 51 | |
| 6 | Port Vale | 46 | 18 | 15 | 13 | 61 | 54 | 1.130 | 51 | |
| 7 | Peterborough United | 46 | 19 | 12 | 15 | 47 | 53 | 0.887 | 50 | |
| 8 | Walsall | 46 | 18 | 13 | 15 | 67 | 52 | 1.288 | 49 | |
| 9 | Preston North End | 46 | 19 | 11 | 16 | 63 | 56 | 1.125 | 49 | |
| 10 | Gillingham | 46 | 17 | 14 | 15 | 65 | 60 | 1.083 | 48 | |
| 11 | Colchester United | 46 | 17 | 13 | 16 | 70 | 63 | 1.111 | 47 | |
| 12 | Hereford United | 46 | 16 | 14 | 16 | 64 | 66 | 0.970 | 46 | |
| 13 | Wrexham | 46 | 15 | 15 | 16 | 65 | 55 | 1.182 | 45 | Qualification for the Cup Winners' Cup first round |
| 14 | Bury | 46 | 16 | 12 | 18 | 53 | 50 | 1.060 | 44 | |
| 15 | Chesterfield | 46 | 16 | 12 | 18 | 62 | 66 | 0.939 | 44 | |
| 16 | Grimsby Town | 46 | 15 | 13 | 18 | 55 | 64 | 0.859 | 43 | |
| 17 | Halifax Town | 46 | 13 | 17 | 16 | 49 | 65 | 0.754 | 43 | |
| 18 | Southend United | 46 | 13 | 16 | 17 | 46 | 51 | 0.902 | 42 | |
| 19 | Brighton & Hove Albion | 46 | 16 | 10 | 20 | 56 | 64 | 0.875 | 42 | |
| 20 | Aldershot | 46 | 14 | 11 | 21 | 53 | 63 | 0.841 | 39 | |
| 21 | Bournemouth (R) | 46 | 13 | 12 | 21 | 44 | 58 | 0.759 | 38 | Relegation to the Fourth Division |
| 22 | Tranmere Rovers (R) | 46 | 14 | 9 | 23 | 55 | 57 | 0.965 | 37 | Relegation to the Fourth Division |
| 23 | Watford (R) | 46 | 10 | 17 | 19 | 52 | 75 | 0.693 | 37 | Relegation to the Fourth Division |
| 24 | Huddersfield Town (R) | 46 | 11 | 10 | 25 | 47 | 76 | 0.618 | 32 | Relegation to the Fourth Division |

Rules for classification: 1) Points; 2) Goal average; 3) Goals scored
(C) Champions; (P) Promoted; (R) Relegated

=== Fourth Division ===
Mansfield Town won the Fourth Division title by a six-point margin, and went up along with Shrewsbury Town, Rotherham United and League Cup semi-finalists Chester, who enjoyed their first promotion since joining the Football League in 1931. Lincoln City, managed by the league's youngest manager, Graham Taylor, missed out on promotion on goal average.

Scunthorpe, Workington, Swansea and Darlington retained their league status as the Football League voted for the third successive season to re-elect its four lowest-placed members.

| Pos | Team | Pld | W | D | L | GF | GA | GAv | Pts | Promotion or relegation |
|---|---|---|---|---|---|---|---|---|---|---|
| 1 | Mansfield Town (C, P) | 46 | 28 | 12 | 6 | 90 | 40 | 2.250 | 68 | Promotion to the Third Division |
| 2 | Shrewsbury Town (P) | 46 | 26 | 10 | 10 | 80 | 43 | 1.860 | 62 | Promotion to the Third Division |
| 3 | Rotherham United (P) | 46 | 22 | 15 | 9 | 71 | 41 | 1.732 | 59 | Promotion to the Third Division |
| 4 | Chester (P) | 46 | 23 | 11 | 12 | 64 | 38 | 1.684 | 57 | Promotion to the Third Division |
| 5 | Lincoln City | 46 | 21 | 15 | 10 | 79 | 48 | 1.646 | 57 | |
| 6 | Cambridge United | 46 | 20 | 14 | 12 | 62 | 44 | 1.409 | 54 | |
| 7 | Reading | 46 | 21 | 10 | 15 | 63 | 47 | 1.340 | 52 | |
| 8 | Brentford | 46 | 18 | 13 | 15 | 53 | 45 | 1.178 | 49 | |
| 9 | Exeter City | 46 | 19 | 11 | 16 | 60 | 63 | 0.952 | 49 | |
| 10 | Bradford City | 46 | 17 | 13 | 16 | 56 | 51 | 1.098 | 47 | |
| 11 | Southport | 46 | 15 | 17 | 14 | 56 | 56 | 1.000 | 47 | |
| 12 | Newport County | 46 | 19 | 9 | 18 | 68 | 75 | 0.907 | 47 | |
| 13 | Hartlepool | 46 | 16 | 11 | 19 | 52 | 62 | 0.839 | 43 | |
| 14 | Torquay United | 46 | 14 | 14 | 18 | 46 | 61 | 0.754 | 42 | |
| 15 | Barnsley | 46 | 15 | 11 | 20 | 62 | 65 | 0.954 | 41 | |
| 16 | Northampton Town | 46 | 15 | 11 | 20 | 67 | 73 | 0.918 | 41 | |
| 17 | Doncaster Rovers | 46 | 14 | 12 | 20 | 65 | 79 | 0.823 | 40 | |
| 18 | Crewe Alexandra | 46 | 11 | 18 | 17 | 34 | 47 | 0.723 | 40 | |
| 19 | Rochdale | 46 | 13 | 13 | 20 | 59 | 75 | 0.787 | 39 | |
| 20 | Stockport County | 46 | 12 | 14 | 20 | 43 | 70 | 0.614 | 38 | |
| 21 | Darlington | 46 | 13 | 10 | 23 | 54 | 67 | 0.806 | 36 | Re-elected |
| 22 | Swansea City | 46 | 15 | 6 | 25 | 46 | 73 | 0.630 | 36 | Re-elected |
| 23 | Workington | 46 | 10 | 11 | 25 | 36 | 66 | 0.545 | 31 | Re-elected |
| 24 | Scunthorpe United | 46 | 7 | 15 | 24 | 41 | 78 | 0.526 | 29 | Re-elected |

Source: rsssf.com
(C) Champions; (P) Promoted

=== Top goalscorers ===
First Division

- Malcolm Macdonald (Newcastle United) – 21 goals

Second Division

- Brian Little (Aston Villa) – 20 goals

Third Division

- Dixie McNeil (Hereford United) – 31 goals

Fourth Division

- Ray Clarke (Mansfield Town) – 28 goals

== Non-league football ==
| Competition | Winners |
|---|---|
| Isthmian League | Wycombe Wanderers |
| Northern Premier League | Wigan Athletic |
| Southern League | Wimbledon |
| FA Trophy | Matlock Town |
| FA Vase | Hoddesdon Town |

== Star players ==
- Colin Todd added the PFA Players' Player of the Year award to the league championship medal he collected with Derby County.
- 19-year-old West Ham goalkeeper Mervyn Day collected the PFA Young Player of the Year along with an FA Cup winners medal.
- Fulham's experienced midfielder Alan Mullery was voted FWA Footballer of the Year.

== Star managers ==
- Dave Mackay helped Derby County win the league championship in his first full season as manager.
- John Lyall had a fine first season as West Ham United manager by guiding them to FA Cup glory.
- Ron Saunders guided Aston Villa to promotion and League Cup glory.
- Tommy Docherty helped Manchester United regain their First Division status at the first time of asking.
- Bobby Robson continued to raise standards at Ipswich Town – and almost guided them to league championship glory.
