= Phil Boyer =

English footballer (born 1949)

Personal information
- Full name: Philip John Boyer
- Date of birth: 25 January 1949 (age 77)
- Place of birth: Nottingham, England
- Height: 5 ft 8 in (1.73 m)
- Position: Striker

Youth career
- 1965–1966: Derby County

Senior career*
Years	Team	Apps	(Gls)
1966–1968	Derby County	0	(0)
1968–1970	York City	109	(27)
1970–1974	AFC Bournemouth	140	(46)
1974–1977	Norwich City	116	(34)
1977–1980	Southampton	138	(49)
1980–1983	Manchester City	20	(3)
1982	→ Bulova SA (loan)	7	(1)
1983–1985	Grantham Town	50	(10)
1985	Stamford AFC	?	(?)
1985	Shepshed Charterhouse	?	(?)
1985–1987	Grantham Town	46	(8)
Total		619	(178)

International career
1974–1975	England U23	2	(0)
1976	England	1	(0)
- * Club domestic league appearances and goals

Philip John Boyer (born 25 January 1949) is an English former professional footballer who played as a striker.

He played for various clubs throughout his career and came through the academy at Derby County, leaving for York City in 1968 without making an appearance for Derby. In 1970, he signed for AFC Bournemouth before leaving for Norwich City four years later. Boyer joined Southampton in 1977 and spent three years with the club. In 1980, he joined Manchester City and was sent on loan at Hong Kong club Bulova SA in February 1982. After 1983, Boyer would spend the remainder of his playing career in non-league football.

Boyer only made one senior appearance for the England national team in 1976, becoming Norwich's first English international.

== Club career ==
=== Early career ===
Born in Nottingham, Boyer attended Musters Road School, Nottingham, from where he joined Derby County as a trainee in August 1965. Although he signed as a professional in November 1966, manager Brian Clough allowed him to leave the Baseball Ground in July 1968, without having made a first team appearance.

=== York City ===
After completing his apprenticeship with Derby County, Boyer moved to York City in July 1968 for a fee of £3,500. In 125 appearances, Boyer scored 34 times but played an important role in creating opportunities for forward partner Ted MacDougall, with whom he was later to play at three other clubs. At the end of his first season at Bootham Crescent, York successfully applied for re-election to the Fourth Division, and their fortunes then gradually improved and they achieved promotion at the end of the 1970–71 season – after Boyer had left.

=== AFC Bournemouth ===
After his teammate moved to Bournemouth & Boscombe Athletic, it was only a matter of time before Cherries manager John Bond signed Boyer as well, and he successfully offered £20,000 for Boyer in December 1970. Like the club he had just left, Bournemouth were also promoted – as runners-up – from the Fourth Division at the end of his first season at Dean Court, with Boyer scoring 11 league goals in 23 appearances as he once again linked up with MacDougall.

The following season, Bournemouth finished in third place in Division 3, narrowly missing a second successive promotion, with Boyer ever-present, scoring 15 goals and helping MacDougall to score 35.

=== Norwich City ===
When Bond moved to Norwich City in November 1973, he reunited the pair when he signed MacDougall from West Ham almost immediately and then signed Boyer from Bournemouth for £145,000 in February 1974. He made his Canaries debut against Sheffield United at Carrow Road on 9 February 1974.

The end of the 1973–74 season saw Norwich relegated in last place, but the following season Bond guided them back to the top flight at the first attempt and also to the 1975 League Cup final, which they lost 1–0 to Aston Villa at Wembley. During the 1974–75 season, Boyer did not miss many matches and shared more than half of Norwich's goals with MacDougall. The pairing's share was almost identical during the 1975–76 season.

=== Southampton ===
In August 1977, manager Lawrie McMenemy, who was building a team to gain promotion back to Division 1, signed Boyer for a fee of £130,000 for Southampton, who MacDougall had joined a year earlier. Boyer had the task of replacing Mick Channon, who had been sold to Manchester City. He made his debut against Brighton & Hove Albion at the same time as Chris Nicholl and Mike Pickering, in a team that also included Alan Ball, Nick Holmes and Steve Williams. Boyer enjoyed a superb first season with the Saints, netting 17 goals in 41 league games which, together with MacDougall, helped Southampton gain promotion to the First Division as runners-up in Division 2 at the end of the 1977–78 season.

Although he played in every league game, he struggled for goals in the top flight during the 1978–79 season, scoring seven, as well as losing his strike partner MacDougall, who had returned to Bournemouth in November 1978. On 17 March 1979, Boyer again appeared on the losing side in a League Cup final, as Southampton lost 2–3 to Nottingham Forest.

In the 1979–80 season he collected a return of 23 goals from 42 games, including three hat-tricks, to finish as Division One's leading scorer – again ever-present. His first two hat-tricks came in successive home games, a 4–0 victory against Derby County and a 3–1 victory against Crystal Palace. In November 1979, he scored two goals against then reigning European champions in a 4–1 victory against Nottingham Forest. Boyer scored his third hat-trick of the season in a 5–2 victory against relegated Bristol City.

Despite this return, following the arrival of Kevin Keegan in the 1980–81 season, he found it difficult to get into the team. During his time at the club, he made a total of 162 appearances and scored 61 goals.

=== Manchester City ===
In November 1980, he joined Manchester City for a fee of £220,000. His career at Manchester City was blighted by injury and he only made a handful of appearances, and suffered the heart-break of missing out on the 1981 FA Cup final due to injury.

=== Later career ===
In February 1982 he moved to Hong Kong, where he played for Bulova on-loan.

He then joined Grantham after returning to the Nottingham area and made his debut in September 1983 in a Northern Premier League game at Horwich RMI, with his first goal coming the following week at home to Mossley. He left Grantham towards the end of their time in the NPL to have short spells at Stamford and Shepshed Charterhouse, before manager Barry Shaw brought him back to Grantham as his assistant during the 1985–86 season.

Boyer briefly followed Shaw in a management role at Harrowby United.

== International career ==
Boyer made two England under-23 appearances before manager Don Revie called him into the senior national squad and gave him his only full cap in a 2–1 victory over Wales on 24 March 1976, thus becoming Norwich City's first English international.

== Personal life ==
Since his retirement, he worked as a bank courier and lives in his home town, Nottingham.

== Honours ==
Norwich City

- Football League Cup runner-up: 1974–75

Southampton

- Football League Cup runner-up: 1978–79
