= Sam Wynne =

English footballer

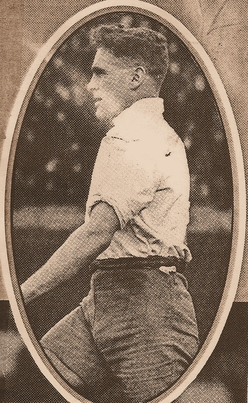

Personal information
- Full name: Samuel Wynne
- Date of birth: 26 April 1897
- Place of birth: Neston, England
- Date of death: 30 April 1927 (aged 30)
- Place of death: Sheffield, England
- Height: 5 ft 9 1/2 in (1.77 m)
- Position: Right back

Senior career*
Years	Team	Apps	(Gls)
1921–1926	Oldham Athletic	145	(9)
1926–1927	Bury	18	(1)
Total		163	(10)
- * Club domestic league appearances and goals

Samuel Wynne (26 April 1897 – 30 April 1927) was a footballer who died while playing in a Football League First Division match.

== Career ==
Wynne played as a right back and started his career in local-league football with Neston Colliery. He later had a spell with Welsh side Connah's Quay & Shotton United before joining Football League club Oldham Athletic at the start of the 1921–22 season.

In 1923, Wynne became the first player to score two goals for both sides during Oldham's Football League First Division match against Manchester United. In 1976, Chris Nicholl became the second top tier player to achieve this feat playing for Aston Villa against Leicester City.

Wynne stayed with Oldham for five seasons, making 145 league appearances in total, scoring nine goals. He signed for Bury in the summer of 1926 and played 18 league matches for the club before his death in April of the following year.

== Death ==
On 30 April 1927, during Bury's Football League First Division match away to Sheffield United, Wynne collapsed while placing the ball for a free kick after the Sheffield forward Harry Johnson had been adjudged offside. He was stretchered from the field of play and pronounced dead; the cause of death was determined to be a cerebral haemorrhage. The match, which Sheffield had led 1–0 through an own goal from Bury's Jimmy Porter, was subsequently abandoned. Sam Wynne's memorial is located in Neston cemetery.
