= Charlie Aitken (footballer, born 1942) =

Scottish footballer (1942–2023)

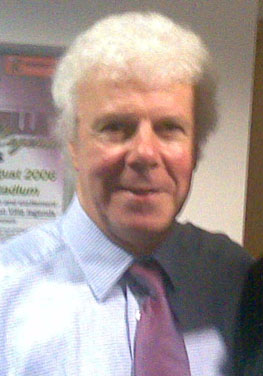
- Aitken in 2006

Personal information
- Full name: Charles Alexander Aitken
- Date of birth: 1 May 1942
- Place of birth: Edinburgh, Scotland
- Date of death: 29 October 2023 (aged 81)
- Position: Left-back

Youth career
- Gorebridge Juniors
- Edinburgh Thistle
- 1959–1961: Aston Villa

Senior career*
Years	Team	Apps	(Gls)
1961–1976	Aston Villa	561	(14)
1976–1977	New York Cosmos	24	(0)
Total		585	(14)

International career
1961–1962	Scotland U23	3	(0)
1962	SFA trial v SFL	1	(0)
- * Club domestic league appearances and goals

Charles Alexander Aitken (1 May 1942 – 29 October 2023) was a Scottish footballer most associated with Aston Villa. Aitken is the West Midlands club's all-time record appearance-maker, having played 660 times for them. A left-back, he joined Joe Mercer's Aston Villa as a 17-year-old youth in August 1959. Aitken played in the 1975 Football League Cup final.

== Career ==
Aitken, from Edinburgh, was educated at John Watson's Institution where he played rugby. His father was a cattle exporter and farm manager. He had one brother. The 18-year-old debuted for the first team on 29 Apr 1961 in a 4–1 First Division home victory over Sheffield Wednesday, playing with Gerry Hitchens and Johnny Dixon in their last Villa games.

The 33-year-old Aitken's last game was a 2–0 defeat at home to QPR on 31 January 1976 under Ron Saunders. Aitken then embarked on a one-year spell with the New York Cosmos where he made 24 appearances, playing with teammate Pele.

Aitken played for Villa in the top three tiers of English football, winning the Third Division and the League Cup during his time at the club. He also scored 16 goals for Villa and was capped by the Scotland Under-23s.

Aitken's 660 games have him atop Villa's appearance charts, with Billy Walker on 531 and Gordon Cowans on 527.

Charlie Aitken died on 29 October 2023, at the age of 81.

== Honours ==
Aston Villa

- Football League Cup: 1974–75; runner-up: 1962–63, 1970–71
