= Frank Carrodus =

English footballer (born 1949)

Personal information
- Date of birth: 31 May 1949 (age 77)
- Place of birth: Cheshire, England
- Height: 5 ft 9 in (1.75 m)
- Position: Winger

Senior career*
Years	Team	Apps	(Gls)
1964–1969	Heys Albion		
1969	Altrincham	1	(0)
1969–1974	Manchester City	42	(1)
1974–1979	Aston Villa	150	(7)
1979–1982	Wrexham	97	(6)
1982–1983	Birmingham City	8	(0)
1983–1984	Bury	34	(1)
1984–1985	Witton Albion		
1985–1986	Runcorn	25	(0)
1986–1987	Macclesfield Town	16	(1)
1987	Altrincham	2	(0)
Total		375	(16)
- * Club domestic league appearances and goals

Frank Carrodus (born 31 May 1949) is an English former professional footballer who played as a winger. In his career Carrodus played in the Football League for Manchester City, Aston Villa, Wrexham, Birmingham City and Bury.

== Career ==
=== Manchester City ===
Carrodus had to compete with Francis Lee for a place in the City team for the 1974 League Cup final. Lee was declared fit and manager, Ron Saunders dropped Carrodus to the subs bench.

=== Aston Villa ===
When Saunders moved to Villa, he bought Carrodus for £90,000 to fill the gap in midfield left by the sale of Bruce Rioch. Carrodus played in the 1975 Football League Cup final. He was to feature in the first two matches of the 1977 League Cup Final but missed out on the victory game having torn knee ligaments in a match against Derby following the first Replay.

Carrodus suffered further injuries in the 1978–79 season. He had already missed four games with a thigh strain when a cartilage operation in October sidelined him for two months.

== Honours ==
Aston Villa

- Football League Cup: 1974–75, 1976–77
