= Ted MacDougall =

Scottish footballer (born 1947)

Personal information
- Full name: Edward John MacDougall
- Date of birth: 8 January 1947 (age 79)
- Place of birth: Inverness, Scotland
- Height: 5 ft 10 in (1.78 m)
- Position: Forward

Youth career
- 1964–1966: Liverpool

Senior career*
Years	Team	Apps	(Gls)
1966–1967	Liverpool	0	(0)
1967–1969	York City	84	(34)
1969–1972	AFC Bournemouth	146	(103)
1972–1973	Manchester United	18	(5)
1973	West Ham United	24	(5)
1973–1976	Norwich City	112	(51)
1974	→ Jewish Guild (loan)		
1976–1978	Southampton	86	(42)
1978	→ Weymouth (loan)	1	(0)
1978–1980	AFC Bournemouth	52	(16)
1979	→ Detroit Express (loan)	19	(9)
1980	Blackpool	13	(0)
1981	Salisbury	5	(4)
1981	Poole Town	3	(1)
1982	AFC Totton		
1982	Gosport Borough		
1982	Floreat Athena		
1982	St George-Budapest	9	(2)
1982–1983	AFC Totton		
1983–1984	Andover	4	(3)
Total		535	(256)

International career
1975	Scotland	7	(3)
- * Club domestic league appearances and goals

Edward John MacDougall (born 8 January 1947) is a Scottish former footballer who played as a forward. He was a prolific goalscorer who played for eight teams, scoring 256 goals in 535 League appearances and winning seven full international caps for Scotland. In an FA Cup tie for AFC Bournemouth, in November 1971, he scored nine goals in an 11–0 win against Margate. He formed a successful striking partnership with Phil Boyer at four of his clubs.

== Playing career ==
MacDougall was born and raised in Inverness, moving to Widnes, Lancashire, with his parents shortly after his 12th birthday. He subsequently played in a local men's amateur league, and worked as a trainee compositor on a local newspaper.

=== Liverpool ===
MacDougall joined Liverpool as an apprentice in 1964 and, on the day he turned 19, he was offered a professional contract at Anfield by manager Bill Shankly. However, MacDougall did not make it at Liverpool, where Ian St. John, Roger Hunt and Tony Hateley shared the goal-scoring duties, and made no first-team appearances.

=== York City ===
In 1967 MacDougall left Liverpool to join Fourth Division York City for £5,000.

He quickly established himself as a prolific centre-forward. He scored on his debut against Workington, and went on to finish with 15 goals in his first season at Bootham Crescent.

In the following season MacDougall linked up for the first time with Phil Boyer, who helped him score 19 times despite the fact that York were struggling near the bottom of the table.

Despite the fact that MacDougall scored 40 goals in two seasons, York had to apply twice for re-election during his two seasons at the club

=== AFC Bournemouth ===
In the summer of 1969, manager Freddie Cox brought in three new strikers at Bournemouth & Boscombe Athletic. One of the new strikers, MacDougall, was to become known as "SuperMac". £10,000 was paid to York City for MacDougall's signature.

Despite MacDougall's signing, and the 21 league goals he contributed, the Cherries were relegated to the 4th Division in 1970 and Freddie Cox was sacked by the then chairman Harold Walker.

In came John Bond, who, at first, didn't rate MacDougall. By October, however, he had netted 16 goals, helping the team to climb to the top of the table. That season also saw the club record for the number of goals scored in a game smashed as MacDougall put six past Oxford City in an FA Cup replay that eventually finished 8–1.

In December 1970, on MacDougall's recommendation, Bond snapped up Phil Boyer from York City to be re-united with MacDougall. The pairing helped Bournemouth and Boscombe to promotion in second place, with MacDougall scoring 42 league goals.

On their return to Division 3 in the 1971–72 season, and with the new name change to AFC Bournemouth implemented, Bournemouth finished in third place in Division 3, narrowly missing a second successive promotion at a time when only two clubs went up.

On 20 November 1971, MacDougall netted an extremely rare "triple hat-trick" in Bournemouth's 11–0 victory over Margate in the first round of the FA Cup. MacDougall scored five in the first half – at which point the Margate boss jokingly asked Bond to substitute their tormentor – and another four after the interval. This is still the largest-ever individual haul of goals by any player in the proper rounds of the FA Cup, although two players – Chris Marron of South Shields and Paul Jackson of Stocksbridge Park Steels – have scored ten goals in the qualifying rounds.

MacDougall was becoming popular with 35 league goals to his name. Aside from his Margate exploits, he also made the headlines in February of that season for his spectacular flying header away to Aston Villa in front of a 48,000 crowd and the Match of the Day cameras.

Wolverhampton Wanderers, West Ham United, Coventry City and Crystal Palace were all chasing the striker over the summer of 1972. MacDougall stayed and pledged his loyalty to Bournemouth, but in September 1972, John Bond accepted an offer of £200,000 from Manchester United. This was a Third Division transfer record at the time.

After 126 goals in just 165 appearances for the Cherries, MacDougall moved to Lancashire.

=== Manchester United ===
On 27 September 1972, MacDougall moved to Old Trafford after Manchester United offered Bournemouth £200,000 for his services. United were in turmoil at this time, changing manager frequently and trying to replace players such as Denis Law and Bobby Charlton. Frank O'Farrell, the manager who signed MacDougall, left the club soon afterwards and was replaced by Tommy Docherty, and MacDougall's transfer contract was the subject of litigation.

MacDougall scored on his home debut, at Old Trafford against Birmingham City. Before the season was over, MacDougall had left Old Trafford, transferred to West Ham United, as Docherty set out to fashion a new United. In his brief time at United MacDougall scored five goals in eighteen league games.

=== West Ham United ===
MacDougall's stay at West Ham was short. Making his debut on 10 March 1973 against Sheffield United, his first goal came in the next game, his home debut, a 2–1 home win against Manchester City. The following season was a poor one for MacDougall at West Ham and his confidence as a player suffered. He scored only one goal and was sent-off on 6 October 1973 for attacking Burnley player, Doug Collins. A dressing-room punch-up with Billy Bonds following a 4–1 defeat, on 3 November 1973, to Leeds United curtailed his stint at the London club. MacDougall had scored the only West Ham goal of the game but Bonds had criticised his effort and the two fought in the dressing room. Manager Ron Greenwood had been aware of the incident and had allowed it to continue. It was his last goal for West Ham. He played only four more games, his last in December 1973.

=== Norwich City ===
In 1973, MacDougall moved to Norwich City, where he was reunited with John Bond, who had managed him at Bournemouth, together with several of his former Dean Court colleagues. He also linked up again with Phil Boyer, who had played alongside MacDougall at both Bournemouth and York.

At the end of the 1973–74 season, the Canaries were relegated to the Second Division, although in the following season they not only regained their First Division status but also reached the final of the League Cup.

In the semi-final, Norwich defeated MacDougall's former club Manchester United (who were also spending a season in the Second Division). The final against Aston Villa was a tense, scrappy affair in which MacDougall had few scoring opportunities, with Villa winning by a single goal. It would be MacDougall's only cup final appearance.

At the end of the 1974–75 season, MacDougall was given his only run in the Scottish national side. He made a scoring debut against Sweden, and managed three goals in seven games before being passed over as competition for places in the Scottish team was fairly intense at this time.

In the 1975–76 season, Norwich were able to maintain their First Division place, with MacDougall contributing 23 goals, making him the division's top scorer. Highlights include two hat-tricks in the space of four games.

Despite this, however, in the autumn of 1976 MacDougall moved on to Second Division Southampton to work with manager Lawrie McMenemy, who was in the process of rebuilding the side, for £50,000. Kevin Reeves was signed for the same sum from Bournemouth to replace him.

=== Southampton ===
At Southampton, he scored 23 league goals in his first season, playing alongside players such as Mick Channon and Peter Osgood, although they were unable to gain promotion to Division One.

In the 1976–77 season, MacDougall had his only taste of European football as the Saints progressed to the quarter-finals of the Cup Winners Cup before losing to Belgian team Anderlecht, although MacDougall did score the winner in a 2–1 victory in the second leg at The Dell.

In the following season, 1977–78, Southampton were finally promoted back to Division One. By now MacDougall had once again renewed his partnership with Phil Boyer, with the pair scoring an astonishing 31 of the team's 70 league goals.

Once Southampton had secured their place back in the First Division, McMenemy deemed MacDougall "surplus to requirements" – rumoured to have been encouraged to do so by MacDougall himself, who was finding himself a tad "off the pace" as his career progressed towards its culmination, and he was transferred back to Dean Court.

=== Return to Bournemouth ===
In November 1978, six years after departing, MacDougall rejoined Bournemouth, under manager John Benson, on a free transfer from Southampton. Benson was soon replaced by Alec Stock and things were on the up after his first game, in which the Cherries thumped Doncaster 7–1, but the good fortune did not continue as Bournemouth finished in 18th place. MacDougall's second spell at Bournemouth was not as prolific as his first, with just 16 goals in 50 appearances.

== Coaching career ==
In February 1980, MacDougall left Bournemouth to join Alan Ball's Blackpool as player-coach until October 1980 and thereafter was restricted to occasional matches in non-League football at Salisbury City, Poole Town and Gosport Borough.

In June 1998 he rejoined Alan Ball as reserve-team coach at Portsmouth, but was sacked with Ball on 14 December 1999.

MacDougall also spent time based in Atlanta, USA, where he was youth Director of Coaching with the Atlanta Silverbacks.

== Personal life ==
Whilst at Bournemouth, MacDougall started his own business – a sports shop in Boscombe called "Ted MacDougall Sports", with another branch opening in Poole later on. The Boscombe branch was given a grand opening by Geoff Hurst.

He was for a period the landlord of the Mill Arms public house at Dunbridge, Hampshire.

Following his retirement from non-League football, he moved to Vancouver, British Columbia, Canada, where he became a successful property developer.

In July 2013, the redeveloped southern stand at Bournemouth's Dean Court stadium was named after MacDougall in recognition of his service at the club.

== Honours ==
Norwich City

- Football League Cup runner-up: 1974–75

== See also ==
- List of footballers in England by number of league goals (200+)
