= John Robson (footballer, born 1950) =

English footballer

Personal information
- Full name: John Dixon Robson
- Date of birth: 15 July 1950
- Place of birth: Consett, England
- Date of death: 12 May 2004 (aged 53)
- Place of death: Sutton Coldfield, England
- Position: Defender

Senior career*
Years	Team	Apps	(Gls)
1967–1972	Derby County	171	(3)
1972–1978	Aston Villa	144	(1)
Total		315	(4)

International career
1970–1973	England U23	7	(1)
- * Club domestic league appearances and goals

John Dixon Robson (15 July 1950 – 12 May 2004) was an English professional footballer who played as a defender. He began his career with Derby County, helping the side win the First Division title during the 1971–72 season, before joining Aston Villa in December 1972 for £90,000.

With Villa, he made over 150 appearances in all competitions and won the Football League Cup in 1975 and 1977. In 1978, he was diagnosed with the early stages of multiple sclerosis and was forced to retire from football.

== Career ==
Robson was born in Consett, Durham and represented the county at schoolboy level before joining Derby County. He made his debut for the England under-23 side in 1970 and went on to win a total of seven caps for the side. He established himself in the first-team and, during the 1971–72 season, Robson missed just one match as he helped the club win the First Division title.

In December 1972, Aston Villa manager Vic Crowe paid £90,000 to sign Robson. He helped the club to win the Football League Cup twice, in 1975 and 1977, and went on to make 176 appearances in all competitions. At the age of 28, he was diagnosed as being in the early stages of multiple sclerosis (MS) and was forced to retire from playing.

== After football ==
Following his retirement, Robson ran a newsagents in Boldmere, Sutton Coldfield but was forced to leave the job when his MS worsened. He struggled to deal with the psychological effects of his condition until he was rushed from a hospice in Erdington and died a day later at Good Hope Hospital at the age of 53 on 12 May 2004.

== Honours ==
Derby County

- Football League First Division: 1971–72
- Football League Second Division promotion: 1968–69
- Watney Cup: 1970
- Texaco Cup: 1971–72

Aston Villa

- Football League Cup: 1974–75, 1976–77
