= Keith Masefield =

English footballer

Personal information
- Full name: Keith Leonard Masefield
- Date of birth: 26 February 1957 (age 69)
- Place of birth: Birmingham, England
- Position: Full back

Youth career
- Warwickshire & District Schools
- 1972–1977: Aston Villa

Senior career*
Years	Team	Apps	(Gls)
1974–1977	Aston Villa	4	(0)
1977–1988	HFC Haarlem	271	(6)
1988–1989	Beerschot VAC	32	(0)
1989–1991	Telstar	32	(0)
1991–1994	FC Lisse		
1994–199?	SV DIO		
- * Club domestic league appearances and goals

Keith Leonard Masefield (born 26 February 1957) is an English former professional footballer. He played for many teams, including Aston Villa, HFC Haarlem, Beerschot VAC, SC Telstar, and FC Lisse.
