= Jim Cumbes =

English sportsman (born 1944)

Cricket information
- Batting: Right-handed
- Bowling: Right-arm-medium

Career statistics
| Competition | First-class | List A |
|---|---|---|
| Matches | 161 | 127 |
| Runs scored | 498 | 99 |
| Batting average | 7.54 | 4.5 |
| 100s/50s | 0/0 | 0/0 |
| Top score | 43 | 14* |
| Balls bowled | 25,186 | 6,005 |
| Wickets | 379 | 136 |
| Bowling average | 30.20 | 29.38 |
| 5 wickets in innings | 13 | 1 |
| 10 wickets in match | 0 | 0 |
| Best bowling | 6/24 | 4/23 |
| Catches/stumpings | 38/– | 25/– |
- Source: CricketArchive, 16 April 2023

Jim Cumbes
Personal information
- Full name: James Cumbes
- Date of birth: 4 May 1944 (age 82)
- Place of birth: Manchester, England
- Height: 6 ft 2 in (1.88 m)
- Position: Goalkeeper

Youth career
- 1961–1964: Runcorn

Senior career*
| Years | Team | Apps | (Gls) |
| 1965–1969 | Tranmere Rovers | 137 | (0) |
| 1969–1971 | West Bromwich Albion | 64 | (0) |
| 1971–1975 | Aston Villa | 157 | (0) |
| 1976 | Portland Timbers | 22 | (0) |
| 1977 | Runcorn | | |
| 1978 | Southport | 19 | (0) |
| 1978–1982 | Worcester City | | |
| Total | | 399 | (0) |
- * Club domestic league appearances and goals

James Cumbes (born 4 May 1944) is an English former sportsman. He was born in East Didsbury, Manchester.

Cumbes played first-class cricket for four counties as a right-arm fast-medium bowler and lower-order right-handed batsman, and later was chief executive of Lancashire.

Cumbes also had a substantial career as a professional footballer, where he played in goal. Cumbes played in the 1975 Football League Cup final.

== Cricket ==
Much of Jim Cumbes's early cricket career was limited by his full-time involvement in League football. He made his Lancashire debut against Worcestershire in late August 1963. In a game ruined by bad weather, only 55 overs were possible, although in this time Cumbes did manage to take his maiden First-Class wicket, that of Worcestershire captain Don Kenyon. However, it was to be almost three years before he played another First-Class match, and when that came (against Kent) his 4–42 was rather overshadowed by Derek Underwood's outstanding return of 6–9 for Lancashire's opponents.

Moving to Surrey for the 1968 season, Cumbes at last managed a long run in the side, and took 54 wickets at 17.68 including 6–35 against Oxford University and 6–47 against Hampshire. He was rather less successful the following year, and did not play First-Class cricket at all in 1970, although he did appear in two John Player League games.

For 1971 Cumbes returned to Lancashire, but played only for two months between mid-May and mid-July due to football commitments. Partially due to business interests he moved to Worcestershire. Here he stayed for the best part of a decade with reasonable success, especially in 1977 when he claimed 51 wickets and produced his best innings bowling of 6–24 against Yorkshire to help his side to an innings victory. He was capped by the county the following year, an award heralded by Wisden 1978, who commented on the player's great popularity.

By now playing a great deal of one-day cricket, Cumbes's final year as a player, 1982, was spent with his fourth county, Warwickshire, for whom he took 21 wickets, the last of these being Middlesex and England wicket-keeper Paul Downton. During the season, he suffered a punctured lung during the Sunday League match at Grace Road from which he rapidly recovered.

He was chief executive of Lancashire County Cricket Club from 1998 to 2012. On the pitch, during his tenure the team flattered to deceive until, forced by financial austerity to depend on local players, in 2011 they won the County Championship outright for the first time since 1934. Off the pitch, Old Trafford had become run down and an anachronism in the world of 21st century stadia. Cumbes led the fight against billionaire Albert Gubay and his commercial interests that tried to derail the – now well advanced – redevelopment of the ground.

Cumbes said of his time as Chief Executive: "In terms of achievement and satisfaction, I think sowing the seeds of the redevelopment in 2003, and then seeing it through with everyone else associated at the club, has given me the most satisfaction. At no stage was the process easy, and at times the difficulties almost overwhelmed us. But everyone stuck at it. We had no alternative, no Plan B."

== Football ==
Cumbes enjoyed a varied professional football career as a goalkeeper with Tranmere Rovers, West Bromwich Albion, Aston Villa and Southport. All in all, he appeared in 376 Football League appearances in a 13-year career.

On 27 November 1971, Cumbes kept a clean sheet on his debut as Aston Villa thumped Oldham Athletic 6-0 at Boundary Park.

He also played football in the North American Soccer League for the Portland Timbers, where he played against Pelé. During the 1970s, the eloquent Cumbes cemented his popularity as Aston Villa's goalkeeper by presenting a series of shows on BBC Local Radio in the West Midlands.

== Honours ==
Aston Villa

- Football League Cup: 1974–75
