= Bobby McDonald =

Scottish footballer (born 1955)

Personal information
- Full name: Robert Wood McDonald
- Date of birth: 30 April 1955 (age 71)
- Place of birth: Aberdeen, Scotland
- Height: 5 ft 10 in (1.78 m)
- Position: Left back

Senior career*
Years	Team	Apps	(Gls)
1972–1976	Aston Villa	39	(3)
1976–1980	Coventry City	161	(14)
1980–1983	Manchester City	96	(11)
1983–1987	Oxford United	94	(14)
1987–1988	Leeds United	18	(1)
1988	→ Wolverhampton Wanderers	6	(0)
- V.S. Rugby
Total		414	(43)
- * Club domestic league appearances and goals

Robert Wood McDonald (born 13 April 1955) is a Scottish former footballer, who played in the left back position. McDonald was a defender of great control and positional sense who also had a happy knack of scoring goals.

He played for King Street Sports club in Aberdeen before joining Aston Villa in 1971, turning professional in September 1972. A Scottish youth international, he played in the 1972 Little World Cup when Frank Gray and Kenny Burns were among his contemporaries. After helping Villa to promotion to Division One in 1974-75 and picking up a 1975 League Cup Winners' medal, a £40,000 transfer took him to Coventry City. He played thirty-three starting games and six substitute appearances in the league while at Villa Park, scoring once.

At Coventry he made one hundred and sixty-one consecutive appearances in the League, scoring fourteen goals. Coventry at this time played a very adventurous game and McDonald was encouraged to get forward and join in the attack. One of his best goals for the Sky Blues came in a famous Christmas time win over Norwich City, a game which Coventry eventually won 5-4. For his goal, Bobby was stationed on the by-line just outside the six yard box. He somehow managed to curl the ball inside the near post past Kevin Keelan in the Norwich goal.

Manchester City signed him for £270,000 in October 1980. Again he was a consistent regular amassing ninety-six League appearances and netting eleven times. McDonald was in the City team which lost the 1981 FA Cup Final to Tottenham Hotspur. He went to Oxford United in September 1983 and won a Third Division medal in his first season, followed by a Second Division medal in 1984-85. In League fixtures with Oxford he made ninety-four appearances and scored fourteen goals. He went to Leeds on a month's loan in February 1987, before joining them in a £25,000 deal to help United's push towards the Play-offs, but took no part in their progress to the FA Cup Semi-Final as he was Cup-tied.

Injury cost him his place the following season and he was loaned to Wolves for six matches in February 1988. Granted a free-transfer in May 1988, he joined VS Rugby in the close season. He later played for Burton Albion, joining the Brewers in the summer of 1989, and after that moved around the Non-League scene with some regularity.

== Honours ==
Aston Villa

- Football League Cup: 1974–75

Manchester City

- FA Cup runner-up: 1980–81

Oxford United

- Football League Third Division: 1983–84
