= Chris Nicholl =

Footballer (1946–2024)

Personal information
- Full name: Christopher John Nicholl
- Date of birth: 12 October 1946
- Place of birth: Wilmslow, England
- Date of death: 24 February 2024 (aged 77)
- Height: 6 ft 1 in (1.85 m)
- Position: Centre-back

Youth career
- 1963–1965: Burnley

Senior career*
Years	Team	Apps	(Gls)
1965–1966	Burnley	0	(0)
1966–1968	Witton Albion	59	(3)
1968–1969	Halifax Town	42	(3)
1969–1972	Luton Town	97	(6)
1972–1977	Aston Villa	210	(11)
1977–1983	Southampton	228	(8)
1983–1984	Grimsby Town	70	(0)
Total		706	(37)

International career
1974–1983	Northern Ireland	51	(3)

Managerial career
- 1985–1991: Southampton
- 1994–1997: Walsall
- 1998–2000: Northern Ireland (assistant)
- * Club domestic league appearances and goals

Christopher John Nicholl (12 October 1946 – 24 February 2024) was a professional footballer who later worked as a coach and manager.

A centre-back, Nicholl began his playing career at Burnley, but moved to Witton Albion after failing to break into the Burnley team. After spells at Halifax Town and Luton Town, he joined Aston Villa in 1972, winning the Football League Cup in 1975 and 1977. After five years at Aston Villa, Nicholl joined Southampton. In 1983, he joined Grimsby Town before retiring in 1984.

Born in England, Nicholl made 51 appearances for the Northern Ireland national team scoring three goals. He was part of the Northern Ireland squad for the 1982 FIFA World Cup.

In his managerial career, Nicholl began at Southampton and spent six seasons at the club before being dismissed in 1991. Three years later, he managed Walsall and got promoted from Division Three in his first season in charge, but quit in 1997. He spent two years as assistant manager of Northern Ireland from 1998 to 2000.

== Club career ==
Nicholl started his career at Burnley, but after failing to make a breakthrough, he dropped down to non-league side Witton Albion. He would later join Halifax Town before securing a move to Luton Town in 1969.

Nicholl established himself as a centre-half with Aston Villa. In a Division One game against Leicester City in 1976, he scored all four goals (two of them own goals) in a 2–2 draw. This was the second time that this feat had been achieved in the top tier English football and followed Sam Wynne's record during a 1923 fixture between Oldham Athletic and Manchester United. He captained the side to victory over Everton in the 1976–1977 League Cup after two final replays. Nicholl scored a 35-yard dipping shot in a 3–2 victory against Everton in the second replay of the League Cup final.

Nicholl signed for Southampton in June 1977 and became the backbone of a successful side, missing only three league games in his first season as the club were promoted back to the top flight. In 1979, Nicholl appeared in his third League Cup final, but stated he neglected his "job" of clearing his lines by opting to "control" the ball which allowed Gary Birtles to score. Southampton subsequently lost 3–2 to Nottingham Forest.

Nicholl joined Grimsby Town in August 1983, and helped them to a fifth-placed finish in Division Two in his first season at the club. This was their highest finish since they were relegated from the top flight in 1948.

== International career ==
Nicholl would not make his debut for Northern Ireland until he was 28. He scored against Sweden in the seventh minute of his first match for Northern Ireland. Nicholl scored a total of three goals during his international career, with one against Bulgaria in 1979 and the other against Australia in 1980. He was in Northern Ireland's squad for the 1982 FIFA World Cup, playing its whole five games. On his 37th birthday in October 1983, he won his final cap, against Turkey. He won 51 Northern Ireland caps.

== Managerial career ==
=== Southampton ===
After serving Grimsby Town as assistant manager, he returned to Southampton as the club's manager when Lawrie McMenemy resigned in June 1985. He kept the Saints in the First Division but despite having players of the calibre of Danny and Rod Wallace, Alan Shearer and Matthew Le Tissier in his squad, he tended to be too cautious. During his six seasons in charge, Saints were under-achievers and his best result was in 1989–90 with a finish in 7th place achieved largely thanks to 20 goals from Le Tissier and 18 from Rod Wallace, although they did reach the FA Cup semi-finals in 1986 and the same stage of the League Cup a year later.

In 1991, the Saints finished in 14th place and Nicholl was sacked in favour of Ian Branfoot. Thus ended a period of managerial stability, with only three managers in 36 years and started Southampton's managerial merry-go-round which saw them appoint 12 managers over the next 15 years, and at one stage started three successive seasons with a new manager in charge, although they did hold on to their top flight status until 2005.

Nicholl was responsible for bringing some of the club's most successful players into the first team. These included: Matthew Le Tissier, one of the most prolific strikers in the English league during the 1990s; Alan Shearer, sold to Blackburn Rovers for a British record fee in 1992 and then to Newcastle United for a world record fee in 1996, as well as scoring 30 goals for England; Rod Wallace, who helped Leeds United win the league title a year after leaving Southampton in 1991, and later won several Scottish trophies with Rangers. He also signed teenage goalkeeper Tim Flowers from Wolves in 1986, and seven years later he became Britain's most expensive goalkeeper when he was sold to Blackburn Rovers, helping them win the league title in 1995.

=== Walsall ===
It was three years before Nicholl returned to football. Early in the 1994–95 season he replaced Kenny Hibbitt as manager of Walsall FC and his first season at the club was successful as they were promoted from Division Three as runners-up. The Saddlers finished in the top half of Division Two during the next two seasons but Nicholl quit in May 1997 after failing to get Walsall into Division One, citing family reasons.

Nicholl made a brief return to Walsall as then-manager Ray Graydon's assistant in November 2001, but left in January 2002 through loyalty to Graydon, who had been sacked.

Following the sacking of former Walsall player-manager Paul Merson in February 2006, Nicholl offered his services to the club within hours of Merson's departure. Nicholl remains popular amongst Walsall fans, but was not offered the manager's job – which later went to former Birmingham City captain Kevan Broadhurst.

=== Northern Ireland ===
In 1998, he was invited to work alongside Lawrie McMenemy as assistant manager of Northern Ireland where he spent the next two years.

=== Aston Villa Old Stars ===
Nicholl was the manager of Aston Villa Old Stars, who regularly play in testimonial and charity matches.

== Personal life and death ==
Nicholl was the cousin of former professional football Jimmy Nicholl.

In the BBC documentary 'Dementia, Football and Me' hosted by Alan Shearer, Nicholl revealed he often forgot where he lived due to his dementia, stating that he was "brain-damaged from heading balls". After his illness got worse, he moved back to Southampton to be closer to his family, which cost him £1,500 per week.

Nicholl died on 24 February 2024, at the age of 77. In January 2026, Nicholl’s death certificate was changed to reflect that he had brain disease linked to repetitive head trauma.

== Career statistics ==
=== International goals ===
Scores and results list Northern Ireland's goal tally first, score column indicates score after each Nicholl goal.

List of international goals scored by Chris Nicholl
No.	Date	Venue	Opponent	Score	Result	Competition
1	30 October 1974	Råsunda Stadion, Stockholm, Sweden	Sweden	1–0	2–0	UEFA Euro 1976 qualifying
2	2 May 1979	Windsor Park, Belfast, Northern Ireland	Bulgaria	1–0	2–0	UEFA Euro 1980 qualifying
3	11 June 1980	Sydney Cricket Ground, Sydney, Australia	Australia	1–0	2–1	Friendly

=== Managerial record ===
Team	Nat	From	To	Record				
Team	Nat	From	To	G	W	D	L	Win %
Southampton	(England)	12 July 1985	22 May 1991	293	100	86	107	34.13
Walsall	(England)	1 August 1994	21 May 1997	157	71	41	45	45.22
Total				450	171	127	152	38.00

== Honours ==
=== Player ===
Halifax Town

- Football League Fourth Division runner-up: 1968–69

Aston Villa

- Football League Third Division: 1971–72
- Football League Cup: 1974–75, 1976–77

Southampton

- Football League Cup runner-up: 1978–79

=== Manager ===
Walsall

- Football League Third Division runner-up: 1994–95
