= 1974–75 Football League Cup =

League Cup

Tournament details
- Country: England; Wales
- Teams: 92

Final positions
- Champions: Aston Villa
- Runners-up: Norwich City

Tournament statistics
- Top goal scorer: Malcolm Macdonald (6 goals)

The 1974–75 Football League Cup was the 15th season of the Football League Cup, a knockout competition for England's top 92 football clubs. The tournament started on 19 August 1974 and ended with the final at Wembley on 1 March 1975.

Aston Villa won the tournament after defeating Norwich City in the final at Wembley Stadium, London.

== First round ==
=== Ties ===
Home team	Score	Away team	Date
Barnsley	0–1	Halifax Town	20 August 1974
Bradford City	2–1	Darlington	20 August 1974
Brentford	3–0	Aldershot	21 August 1974
Bristol City	2–1	Cardiff City	19 August 1974
Bristol Rovers	0–0	Plymouth Argyle	20 August 1974
Bury	2–0	Oldham Athletic	20 August 1974
Charlton Athletic	4–0	Peterborough United	20 August 1974
Chester	2–1	Walsall	21 August 1974
Chesterfield	3–0	Grimsby Town	21 August 1974
Colchester United	1–0	Oxford United	20 August 1974
Doncaster Rovers	2–1	Mansfield Town	20 August 1974
Exeter City	3–1	Swansea City	21 August 1974
Gillingham	1–1	Bournemouth	21 August 1974
Hereford United	1–1	Shrewsbury Town	21 August 1974
Newport County	1–0	Torquay United	20 August 1974
Northampton Town	1–0	Port Vale	20 August 1974
Preston North End	1–0	Rochdale	20 August 1974
Reading	0–0	Brighton & Hove Albion	21 August 1974
Rotherham United	1–1	Lincoln City	20 August 1974
Scunthorpe United	1–0	Sheffield Wednesday	20 August 1974
Southend United	2–0	Cambridge United	21 August 1974
Southport	0–2	Tranmere Rovers	21 August 1974
Stockport County	0–2	Blackburn Rovers	21 August 1974
Swindon Town	0–1	Portsmouth	20 August 1974
Watford	1–1	Crystal Palace	21 August 1974
Workington	1–2	Hartlepool	21 August 1974
Wrexham	1–2	Crewe Alexandra	20 August 1974
York City	0–2	Huddersfield Town	21 August 1974

=== Replays ===
Home team	Score	Away team	Date
Bournemouth	1–1	Gillingham	28 August 1974
Brighton & Hove Albion	2–2	Reading	28 August 1974
Crystal Palace	5–1	Watford	27 August 1974
Lincoln City	1–1	Rotherham United	28 August 1974
Plymouth Argyle	0–1	Bristol Rovers	27 August 1974
Shrewsbury Town	0–1	Hereford United	27 August 1974

=== Second replays ===
Home team	Score	Away team	Date
Gillingham	1–2	Bournemouth	3 September 1974
Reading	0–0	Brighton & Hove Albion	3 September 1974
Rotherham United	2–1	Lincoln City	3 September 1974

=== Third replay ===
Home team	Score	Away team	Date
Brighton & Hove Albion	2–3	Reading	5 September 1974

== Second round ==
=== Ties ===
Home team	Score	Away team	Date
Arsenal	1–1	Leicester City	10 September 1974
Aston Villa	1–1	Everton	11 September 1974
Bolton Wanderers	0–0	Norwich City	10 September 1974
Bournemouth	1–1	Hartlepool	11 September 1974
Bradford City	0–1	Carlisle United	11 September 1974
Bury	2–0	Doncaster Rovers	10 September 1974
Chelsea	4–2	Newport County	11 September 1974
Chester	3–1	Blackpool	11 September 1974
Coventry City	1–2	Ipswich Town	10 September 1974
Crewe Alexandra	2–1	Birmingham City	11 September 1974
Crystal Palace	1–4	Bristol City	10 September 1974
Exeter City	0–1	Hereford United	11 September 1974
Huddersfield Town	1–1	Leeds United	10 September 1974
Hull City	1–2	Burnley	11 September 1974
Liverpool	2–1	Brentford	10 September 1974
Luton Town	1–0	Bristol Rovers	11 September 1974
Manchester City	6–0	Scunthorpe United	10 September 1974
Manchester United	5–1	Charlton Athletic	11 September 1974
Northampton Town	2–2	Blackburn Rovers	10 September 1974
Nottingham Forest	1–1	Newcastle United	10 September 1974
Portsmouth	1–5	Derby County	11 September 1974
Preston North End	2–0	Sunderland	10 September 1974
Queens Park Rangers	1–1	Orient	10 September 1974
Reading	4–2	Rotherham United	11 September 1974
Sheffield United	3–1	Chesterfield	10 September 1974
Southampton	1–0	Notts County	10 September 1974
Southend United	0–2	Colchester United	11 September 1974
Stoke City	3–0	Halifax Town	11 September 1974
Tottenham Hotspur	0–4	Middlesbrough	11 September 1974
Tranmere Rovers	0–0	West Ham United	11 September 1974
West Bromwich Albion	1–0	Millwall	10 September 1974
Wolverhampton Wanderers	1–3	Fulham	11 September 1974

=== Replays ===
Home team	Score	Away team	Date
Blackburn Rovers	1–0	Northampton Town	18 September 1974
Everton	0–3	Aston Villa	18 September 1974
Hartlepool	2–2	Bournemouth	18 September 1974
Leeds United	1–1	Huddersfield Town	24 September 1974
Leicester City	2–1	Arsenal	18 September 1974
Orient	0–3	Queens Park Rangers	17 September 1974
Newcastle United	3–0	Nottingham Forest	25 September 1974
Norwich City	3–1	Bolton Wanderers	17 September 1974
West Ham United	6–0	Tranmere Rovers	18 September 1974

=== Second replays ===
Home team	Score	Away team	Date
Bournemouth	1–1	Hartlepool	23 September 1974
Leeds United	2–1	Huddersfield Town	7 October 1974

=== Third replay ===
Home team	Score	Away team	Date
Hartlepool	1–0	Bournemouth	26 September 1974

== Third round ==
=== Ties ===
Home team	Score	Away team	Date
Bristol City	0–0	Liverpool	8 October 1974
Bury	1–2	Leeds United	9 October 1974
Chelsea	2–2	Stoke City	9 October 1974
Chester	1–0	Preston North End	9 October 1974
Colchester United	2–0	Carlisle United	9 October 1974
Crewe Alexandra	2–2	Aston Villa	9 October 1974
Fulham	2–1	West Ham United	8 October 1974
Hartlepool	1–1	Blackburn Rovers	9 October 1974
Ipswich Town	4–1	Hereford United	8 October 1974
Manchester United	1–0	Manchester City	9 October 1974
Middlesbrough	1–0	Leicester City	8 October 1974
Queens Park Rangers	0–4	Newcastle United	8 October 1974
Reading	1–2	Burnley	9 October 1974
Sheffield United	2–0	Luton Town	8 October 1974
Southampton	5–0	Derby County	8 October 1974
West Bromwich Albion	1–1	Norwich City	9 October 1974

=== Replays ===
Home team	Score	Away team	Date
Aston Villa	1–0	Crewe Alexandra	16 October 1974
Blackburn Rovers	1–2	Hartlepool	16 October 1974
Liverpool	4–0	Bristol City	16 October 1974
Norwich City	2–0	West Bromwich Albion	16 October 1974
Stoke City	1–1	Chelsea	16 October 1974

=== Second replay ===
Home team	Score	Away team	Date
Stoke City	6–2	Chelsea	22 October 1974

== Fourth round ==
=== Ties ===
Home team	Score	Away team	Date
Chester	3–0	Leeds United	13 November 1974
Colchester United	0–0	Southampton	13 November 1974
Hartlepool	1–1	Aston Villa	12 November 1974
Ipswich Town	2–1	Stoke City	12 November 1974
Liverpool	0–1	Middlesbrough	12 November 1974
Manchester United	3–2	Burnley	13 November 1974
Newcastle United	3–0	Fulham	13 November 1974
Sheffield United	2–2	Norwich City	12 November 1974

=== Replays ===
Home team	Score	Away team	Date
Aston Villa	6–1	Hartlepool	25 November 1974
Norwich City	2–1	Sheffield United	27 November 1974
Southampton	0–1	Colchester United	25 November 1974

== Fifth Round ==
=== Ties ===
Home team	Score	Away team	Date
Colchester United	1–2	Aston Villa	3 December 1974
Middlesbrough	0–0	Manchester United	4 December 1974
Newcastle United	0–0	Chester	4 December 1974
Norwich City	1–1	Ipswich Town	4 December 1974

=== Replays ===
Home team	Score	Away team	Date
Chester	1–0	Newcastle United	18 December 1974
Ipswich Town	1–2	Norwich City	10 December 1974
Manchester United	3–0	Middlesbrough	18 December 1974

== Semi-finals ==
No first division teams reached the semi-final stage.

=== First leg ===
Home team	Score	Away team	Date
Chester	2–2	Aston Villa	15 January 1975
Manchester United	2–2	Norwich City	15 January 1975

=== Second leg ===
Home team	Score	Away team	Date	Agg
Aston Villa	3–2	Chester	22 January 1975	5–4
Norwich City	1–0	Manchester United	22 January 1975	3–2

== Final ==
The final was held at Wembley Stadium, London, on 1 March 1975.

1 March 1975

Aston Villa	1–0	Norwich City
Graydon 81'

Wembley Stadium, London
Attendance: 95,946
Referee: G. Hill

GK	1	Jimmy Cumbes
RB	2	John Robson
LB	3	Charlie Aitken
CB	4	Ian Ross (c)
CB	5	Chris Nicholl
MF	6	Bobby McDonald
RW	7	Ray Graydon
FW	8	Brian Little
CF	9	Keith Leonard
MF	10	Chico Hamilton
MF	11	Frank Carrodus
Substitute:
??	12	Alun Evans
Manager:
Ron Saunders

GK	1	Kevin Keelan
RB	2	Mel Machin
LB	3	Colin Sullivan
MF	4	Peter Morris
CB	5	Duncan Forbes (c)
CB	6	Dave Stringer
RW	7	John Miller
CF	8	Ted MacDougall
CF	9	Phil Boyer
MF	10	Colin Suggett
LW	11	Tony Powell
Substitute:
MF	12	Billy Steele
Manager:
John Bond
