= Brian Little =

English football manager (born 1953)

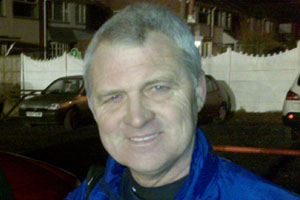
- Little in 2010

Personal information
- Date of birth: 25 November 1953 (age 72)
- Place of birth: Newcastle upon Tyne, England
- Position: Striker

Youth career
- 1969–1971: Aston Villa

Senior career*
Years	Team	Apps	(Gls)
1971–1980	Aston Villa	247	(60)

International career
1975	England	1	(0)

Managerial career
- 1986: Wolverhampton Wanderers
- 1989–1991: Darlington
- 1991–1994: Leicester City
- 1994–1998: Aston Villa
- 1998–1999: Stoke City
- 1999–2000: West Bromwich Albion
- 2000–2002: Hull City
- 2003–2006: Tranmere Rovers
- 2007–2008: Wrexham
- 2009–2011: Gainsborough Trinity
- 2016: Jersey
- * Club domestic league appearances and goals

Brian Little (born 25 November 1953) is an English football manager and former player.

As a player, Little was a striker who spent his entire career for Aston Villa in a career that spanned from 1971 to 1980. He made 247 league appearances, scoring 60 goals and earning a single cap for England in 1975. As a player he won the Football League Cup on two occasions in 1975 and 1977.

As a manager he has been in charge of Wolverhampton Wanderers and Darlington before taking a job in with Leicester City, during his tenure he secured promotion to the Premier League by winning the play-offs in 1994. He was then appointed as manager of fellow top flight side Aston Villa where he went on to win the Football League Cup in 1996. He had later spells in charge of Stoke City, West Bromwich Albion, Hull City, Tranmere Rovers, Wrexham, Gainsborough Trinity and Jersey.

== Playing career ==
On leaving school in May 1969, Little signed for Aston Villa who would be relegated to the Third Division for the first and only time in their history the following season. Little played a full season for the Aston Villa Youth side before he helped the team climb from the Third to First Division in the early part of the decade.

On 30 October 1971, the 17-year-old made his senior debut coming on for Dave Gibson in the 60' minute in a 4–1 win over Blackburn Rovers in the Third Division at Villa Park. He only made two senior appearances that season but was a key player in Villa's FA Youth Cup winning side of 1972.

By 1973–74, with Villa in the Second Division, he was a regular first team player. He scored his first hat-trick against Oldham Athletic in a 5-1 home victory on 12 April 1975, scoring 20 league goals in the 1974–75 season when they were runners-up and clinched promotion to the First Division. He was part of Villa's League Cup winning teams of 1975 and 1977, scoring two goals in the second replay victory over Everton in the latter final.

His playing career came to a halt in 1980 when he retired at the age of 26 due to a knee injury. In the previous year, a congenital spinal defect was detected on X-rays taken during a medical examination at Birmingham City, Aston Villa’s local rivals, resulting in the cancellation of his proposed transfer. He was a forward who formed a prolific partnership with Andy Gray. Little is widely regarded as one of Aston Villa’s greatest players and, in 2007, was named among the 12 inaugural inductees to the Aston Villa Hall of Fame. He made 247 appearances for the club and scored 60 goals, and made one full international appearance for England in 1975.

== Coaching and managerial career ==
Although his playing career was over, Little remained on the Aston Villa payroll as youth team coach. When manager Tony Barton was sacked in the summer of 1984, Little's contract was also terminated and he became first-team coach of Wolverhampton Wanderers.

=== Wolverhampton Wanderers ===
Brian Little was appointed caretaker manager of Wolverhampton Wanderers on 31 August 1986 as successor to Sammy Chapman. His appointment came at the end of the blackest spell in the club's history, when three successive relegations had dragged them from the First Division to the Fourth. He oversaw a steady start to the 1986–87 season before Graham Turner was appointed manager 36 days later.

=== Middlesbrough ===
Shortly after leaving Wolverhampton, Little was recruited as a first team coach by Middlesbrough manager Bruce Rioch. Like Wolves, Middlesbrough were a financially troubled club and had narrowly escaped bankruptcy. Little was an important part of the club's coaching staff as Middlesbrough's form improved, and with two successive promotions they were in the First Division for the 1988–89 season. The season ended in relegation for Middlesbrough but in February Little left the Ayresome Park coaching staff and became manager of Darlington.

=== Darlington ===
Darlington were bottom of the Football League in the Fourth Division. He was unable to prevent them from getting relegated to the Conference but they were promoted back into the League at the first time of asking. 1990–91 brought more success for Little and Darlington as they won the Fourth Division championship, and by this stage he was on the radar of bigger clubs looking to appoint a new manager.

=== Leicester City ===
In June 1991, Leicester City appointed Little as their replacement for Gordon Lee. The Foxes had just avoided relegation to the Third and Little was chosen as the man to turn the club's fortunes around. They emerged as promotion contenders in his first season in charge at Filbert Street.

At the end of 1991–92, Leicester came fourth in the Second Division and qualified for the promotion playoffs, the winners securing a place in the new Premier League. They overcame Cambridge United in the semi-finals and were drawn with Blackburn Rovers in the final. But their promotion hopes were dashed when Blackburn striker Mike Newell, a former Leicester player, scored a penalty which took the Lancashire side into the new league. At the end of the 1992–93 season, Leicester qualified for the playoffs again in the new Division One. They overcame Portsmouth in the semi-finals but in the final were 3–0 down shortly after half-time to Swindon Town. They fought back to bring the scoreline to 3–3, however Swindon scored a controversial late fourth goal from the penalty spot to progress to the Premier League.

In 1993–94, however, Leicester won their third consecutive play-offs with a 2–1 win in the final against East Midlands rivals Derby County. This was Leicester's first win in a Wembley final after seven attempts, and took them back into the top flight after a seven-year absence.

In November 1994, following the dismissal of Aston Villa manager Ron Atkinson, Little was linked with a return to Villa Park as manager. Leicester, meanwhile, were struggling among the elite and they went on to be relegated in second from bottom place, with just six league wins all season. With Villa yet to appoint a successor to Atkinson, Little resigned as Leicester manager later that month.

Earlier in the year, former Middlesbrough youth coach Little had been linked with a return to the Teesside club as manager following the departure of Lennie Lawrence, but the job went to Bryan Robson instead.

=== Aston Villa ===
Within days of quitting Leicester, Little was confirmed as Villa's new manager. Villa had finished runners-up in the first Premier League 18 months earlier, but were now in the relegation battle. A 1–1 draw with relegated Norwich City on the last day of the season meant Villa's relegation battle had been won.

Under Little, young players like Mark Bosnich (179) and Ugo Ehiogu (237) were now getting more first team chances, but Villa also made a large number of new signings between November 1994 and August 1995, including Ian Taylor (233), Mark Draper (120), Gary Charles (107) and Savo Milošević (90). Roberto Carlos almost signed for Aston Villa in 1995 following the Umbro Cup match between Sweden and Brazil at Villa Park. Chairman Doug Ellis was so impressed with his performance that he brought him to the boardroom and mutually agreeable terms were reached. However Little was not so keen on the player and. instead, he moved to Inter Milan.

The revamped, younger Villa team gelled well, and 1995–96 was a successful season at Villa Park. The club finished fourth in the Premiership, reached the FA Cup semi-finals and won the Football League Cup with a 3–0 win over Leeds United at Wembley, securing UEFA Cup qualification for the fourth time in six seasons.

Villa qualified for the 1996–97 UEFA Cup and although they were knocked out at the first stage by Swedish side Helsingborg, they qualified for the 1997–98 competition after finishing fifth in the Premiership. In February 1998, Little resigned after just over three years as Aston Villa manager, with the club in the bottom half of the Premiership. His successor John Gregory turned things around, with a seventh place finish clinching a UEFA Cup place.

=== Stoke City ===
Little was appointed manager of Stoke City in May 1998, just after their relegation to Division Two. Little arrived with the only objective was to gain an instant return to the First Division in 1998–99. Stoke began the season in fine form winning 14 of their first 20 matches and they looked well placed for automatic promotion. However their form completely fell away after Christmas and won just seven matches from the remaining 26 and ended up finishing in 8th position. One of those defeats was a 2–0 loss against nine-men Millwall, which Little described as "the worst result in my twelve years in management". In July 1999 Little resigned and stated: "I have tried my best and the disappointment is very hard to take. I hope the supporters understand that it's best that I leave".

=== West Bromwich Albion ===
Little made a quick return to management when he was appointed manager of West Bromwich Albion. The club were languishing in Division One and had been outside the top division since 1986, but continued to struggle in the league under Little.

In January 2000 the promising Italian midfielder Enzo Maresca was transferred to Juventus for £4 million as Albion battled against relegation. Little was sacked in March 2000 after just eight months in charge and replaced by Gary Megson, who guided Albion to promotion two years later.

=== Hull City ===
In April 2000, just one month after leaving the Hawthorns, Little was appointed manager of Division Three strugglers Hull City. The Tigers were hit by huge debts and were locked out of Boothferry Park for one game by the landlord, former tennis player David Lloyd. By the end of the 2000–01 season, Hull had been saved from closure by new owner Adam Pearson, and the club's future looked brighter. They reached the Division Three playoffs, but lost to Leyton Orient in the semi-finals.

In autumn 2001, following the dismissal of manager Peter Taylor, media reports suggested that Little was going to be approached by Leicester City about a possible second spell as manager, but the job went to Dave Bassett instead. By February 2002 Hull City looked well on course for automatic promotion from Division Three. But Little unexpectedly announced his resignation from the club, and under his successor Jan Mølby, the club's fortunes slipped dramatically and they could not even finish high enough for a play-off place.

=== Tranmere Rovers ===
In October 2003, Little made a return to football management with Tranmere Rovers, who were in Division Two.

His first season with the Merseyside club was a success. When he took over they were battling against relegation. But by the end of the season they had climbed up to eighth place and had reached the quarter finals of the FA Cup. He won the Second Division manager of the month award for April 2004. In his first full season as manager, he guided Tranmere to a third-place finish in League One but they lost in the playoffs to miss out on promotion.

Tranmere began 2005–06 as League One promotion favourites, but at the turn of 2006 they were facing a relegation battle. The club only avoided relegation with one game to go and, due to the club's poor finishing position in League One, he left the club by mutual consent on 5 May 2006.

=== Wrexham ===
Out-of-work Little was linked with a return to management with both Gillingham and Port Vale. However, in November 2007, Little took the reins at Wrexham, replacing Brian Carey. With five games remaining in the season the club were in the relegation zone, seven points off safety. They were relegated to the Conference on 22 April 2008 after a 2–0 loss at Hereford United. However, Little signed a two-year contract, promising to revive the club's fortunes.

The 2008-09 season started well, with a 5–0 home victory against Stevenage Borough, another team expected to challenge for promotion. however, a run of poor results followed, with Wrexham being left in the mid-table battle, only four points above the relegation zone and only keeping two clean sheets all season. Following a 3–0 home defeat against Rushden & Diamonds, Little left Wrexham by mutual consent.

=== Gainsborough Trinity ===
On 28 August 2009, Little was appointed manager of Conference North side Gainsborough Trinity. The club had moved to appoint him following the recent dismissal of manager Steve Charles and the resignation of his coaching staff which included formerly appointed caretaker managers Dave Reeves and Steve Blatherwick. However, Little would not take charge of the club's away fixture the following day against Farsley Celtic after it was announced he would not take over from player/caretaker manager Adie Moses until 7 September. Little began building a squad of professionals at Trinity, picking up many players from the Football League and other ex-League players from the Conference National, but despite boasting a large squad of experienced players Trinity narrowly avoided relegation to the Northern Premier League during the 2010–11 season. On 22 August 2011 following one win and two defeats in the opening weeks of the 2011–12 season, Little was sacked as manager of Trinity with Steve Housham taking over as caretaker manager.

=== Jersey ===
Little was appointed as the Jersey FA's Director of Football in November 2014, overseeing the work of first team manager Jimmy Reilly. Reilly went on to lead the islanders to their first Muratti Vase Final victory in four years the following May. Months later, Jersey announced their intention to join UEFA, and when Reilly stepped aside in early 2016 Little was appointed to replace him.

Little won the Muratti in May 2016, but stepped down as manager the following month and reverted to his position as Director of Football; allowing him to concentrate on his commitments at Aston Villa. In January 2024, Little was named by Aston Villa as a member of the Honorary Anniversary Board ahead of the club's 150th anniversary season.

== Career statistics ==
=== Club ===
Appearances and goals by club, season and competition
Club	Season	League			FA Cup		League Cup		Europe		Total	
Club	Season	Division	Apps	Goals	Apps	Goals	Apps	Goals	Apps	Goals	Apps	Goals
Aston Villa	1971–72	Third Division	2	1	0	0	0	0	0	0	2	1
Aston Villa	1972–73	Second Division	19	3	1	0	0	0	0	0	20	3
Aston Villa	1973–74	Second Division	37	8	2	0	1	0	0	0	40	8
Aston Villa	1974–75	Second Division	34	20	2	1	8	3	0	0	44	24
Aston Villa	1975–76	First Division	20	1	0	0	2	0	1	0	23	1
Aston Villa	1976–77	First Division	42	14	4	2	10	10	0	0	56	26
Aston Villa	1977–78	First Division	40	7	1	0	3	1	8	3	52	11
Aston Villa	1978–79	First Division	24	1	0	0	4	1	0	0	28	2
Aston Villa	1979–80	First Division	29	5	6	1	2	0	0	0	37	6
Career total			247	60	16	4	30	15	9	3	302	82

=== International ===
Appearances and goals by national team and year
National team	Year	Apps	Goals
England	1975	1	0
Total		1	0

== Managerial statistics ==
Managerial record by team and tenure
Team	From	To	Record				
Team	From	To	P	W	D	L	Win %
Wolverhampton Wanderers	August 1986	October 1986	8	4	1	3	50.0
Darlington	February 1989	May 1991	75	31	26	18	41.3
Leicester City	May 1991	November 1994	178	76	43	59	42.7
Aston Villa	November 1994	February 1998	164	68	45	51	41.5
Stoke City	May 1998	June 1999	52	23	7	22	44.2
West Bromwich Albion	August 1999	March 2000	41	8	18	15	19.5
Hull City	April 2000	February 2002	97	41	28	28	42.3
Tranmere Rovers	October 2003	June 2006	147	61	43	43	41.5
Wrexham	November 2007	September 2008	44	11	12	21	25.0
Total			798	323	254	221	40.5

== Honours ==
=== As a player ===
Aston Villa

- Football League Cup: 1974–75, 1976–77
- Football League Third Division: 1971–72

=== As a manager ===
Darlington

- Football League Fourth Division: 1990–91
- Football Conference: 1989–90

Leicester City

- Football League First Division play-offs: 1994

Aston Villa

- Football League Cup: 1995–96

Jersey

- Muratti Vase: 2016

Individual

- Premier League Manager of the Month: January 1995
- Football League Third Division Manager of the Month: February 2001
- Football League Second Division Manager of the Month: April 2004
