= Ron Saunders =

English footballer and manager (1932–2019)

Personal information
- Full name: Ronald Saunders
- Date of birth: 6 November 1932
- Place of birth: Birkenhead, Cheshire, England
- Date of death: 7 December 2019 (aged 87)
- Position: Forward

Senior career*
Years	Team	Apps	(Gls)
1951–1955	Everton	3	(0)
1955–1957	Tonbridge Angels	53	(39)
1957–1958	Gillingham	49	(20)
1958–1964	Portsmouth	236	(145)
1964–1965	Watford	39	(18)
1965–1967	Charlton Athletic	65	(24)
Total		445	(246)

Managerial career
- 1967–1969: Yeovil Town
- 1969: Oxford United
- 1969–1973: Norwich City
- 1973–1974: Manchester City
- 1974–1982: Aston Villa
- 1982–1986: Birmingham City
- 1986–1987: West Bromwich Albion
- * Club domestic league appearances and goals

Ronald Saunders (6 November 1932 – 7 December 2019) was an English football player and manager. He played for Everton, Tonbridge Angels, Gillingham, Portsmouth, Watford and Charlton Athletic during a 16-year playing career, before moving into management. He managed seven clubs in 20 years, and he was the first manager to have taken charge of Aston Villa, Birmingham City and West Bromwich Albion, the three rival clubs based in and around the city of Birmingham.

Saunders also managed Yeovil Town, Oxford United, Norwich City and Manchester City. He was involved in football for 36 consecutive years; he left his final managerial role, at West Bromwich Albion, at the age of 54.

== Playing career ==
As a player, he was an old-fashioned, hard-shooting centre forward who scored 246 goals in 16 years for Everton, Tonbridge Angels, Gillingham, Portsmouth, Watford and Charlton Athletic. Saunders was leading goalscorer for six consecutive seasons at Portsmouth and his goals were a key factor in helping Pompey win the Third Division title in 1962. He remains their third highest goalscorer. He retired from full-time playing in 1967, when with Charlton.

== Managerial career ==
=== Early career ===
Saunders became player-manager at non-league Yeovil Town.

=== Norwich City ===
As a manager, Saunders first tasted success at Norwich City, guiding them to the Second Division title in 1972, which saw them promoted to the First Division for the first time in their history. Saunders steered Norwich City to survival in their first season in the top flight. They also reached the League Cup final, losing 1–0 to Tottenham Hotspur. He resigned as Norwich manager on 17 November 1973 following a boardroom row after a 3–1 home defeat to Everton.

=== Manchester City ===
Five days later, Saunders accepted an offer to take over at Manchester City. For the second season running Saunders managed a team to the Football League Cup final, but once again he lost, this time to Wolverhampton Wanderers. Despite their cup success, City's league form was shaky, and Saunders was dismissed three weeks before the end of the season. He did not stay out of work for long however, and the following month joined Second Division side Aston Villa as manager.

=== Aston Villa ===
Saunders guided Villa to promotion to the First Division (as runners-up in the Second Division) in his first season as manager, also winning two League Cup titles, in 1975 and 1977. He became the first manager to take three clubs to the League Cup final in three successive years. In 1980–81, he guided Villa to their first First Division title for 71 years.

He resigned from Villa on 9 February 1982. At the time, Villa were mid-table in the First Division but had reached the quarter-finals of the European Cup. There had been increasing tension between the manager and Chairman Ron Bendall with Saunders complaining about stadium manager Terry Rutter's expenditure and seeking more say over non-footballing matters. Rutter would later receive a suspended prison sentence having been prosecuted for conspiracy to defraud the Football Grounds Improvement Trust and obtaining money by deception from the club. The judge stated that Bendall would have faced these charges too had he not died.

Saunders' assistant Tony Barton then took over, eventually led them to victory in the 1982 European Cup final four months later.

=== Birmingham City ===
Saunders moved straight to Villa's local rivals, Birmingham City. They went down in 1984 but he got them back into the top flight at the first attempt. In January 1986, Saunders walked out on struggling Birmingham to take charge of local rivals and fellow strugglers West Bromwich Albion.

=== West Bromwich Albion ===
Saunders was unable to stop Albion from sliding into the Second Division and was dismissed in September 1987, after failing to get them back into the First Division. This was his last managerial role.

=== Retirement ===
In a friendly fixture staged as a testimonial for the recently deceased Tony Barton, Saunders appeared at Villa Park in 1994 as manager of a Villa side drawn mostly from players who had played in the European Cup final in 1982, against a West Midlands all-stars side. This was the first time he had returned to the club since his resignation some 13 years earlier. In December 2006, the 74-year-old Saunders was the guest of honour at Villa Park for the match between Aston Villa and Manchester United, invited by new chairman Randy Lerner. He returned to Villa Park shortly after, on 5 May 2007, for the 25th anniversary celebrations of the 1982 European Cup win.

=== Managerial statistics ===
Managerial record by team and tenure
Team	From	To	Record					Ref(s)
Team	From	To	P	W	D	L	Win %	Ref(s)
Yeovil Town	17 April 1967	1 March 1969	128	55	36	37	43.0	
Oxford United	1 March 1969	9 July 1969	12	6	3	3	50.0	
Norwich City	10 July 1969	18 November 1973	221	84	61	76	38.0	
Manchester City	22 November 1973	12 April 1974	30	10	9	11	33.3	
Aston Villa	4 June 1974	9 February 1982	395	180	106	109	45.6	
Birmingham City	22 February 1982	16 January 1986	202	72	53	77	35.6	
West Bromwich Albion	14 February 1986	2 September 1987	65	14	19	32	21.5	
Total			1,053	421	287	345	40.0	

== Death ==
Saunders died on 7 December 2019, aged 87.

== Honours ==
=== Player ===
England U18

- FIFA Youth Tournament: 1948

Portsmouth

- Football League Third Division: 1961–62

=== Manager ===
Norwich City

- Football League Second Division: 1971–72
- Football League Cup runner-up: 1972–73

Manchester City

- Football League Cup runner-up: 1973–74

Aston Villa

- Football League First Division: 1980–81
- Football League Cup: 1974–75, 1976–77
- FA Charity Shield: 1981 (shared)

== See also ==
- List of English football championship-winning managers

== Bibliography ==
- Jones, Trefor (1996). The Watford Football Club Illustrated Who's Who. T.G. Jones. p. 205. ISBN 0-9527458-0-1.
