= 1976–77 Everton F.C. season =

English football club season

Everton
1976–77 season
- Manager: Billy Bingham (until 10 January 1977) Steve Burtenshaw (caretaker until 30 January 1977) Gordon Lee (from 30 January 1977)
- Ground: Goodison Park
- First Division: 9th
- FA Cup: Semi-Final
- League Cup: Runners-up
- Top goalscorer: League: Bob Latchford (17); All: Bob Latchford (25)
Home colours	Away colours

During the 1976–77 English football season, Everton F.C. competed in the Football League First Division. They finished 9th in the table with 42 points.

== Final league table ==
Pos	Team	Pld	W	D	L	GF	GA	GD	Pts
7	West Bromwich Albion	42	16	13	13	62	56	+6	45
8	Arsenal	42	16	11	15	64	59	+5	43
9	Everton	42	14	14	14	62	64	−2	42
10	Leeds United	42	15	12	15	48	51	−3	42
11	Leicester City	42	12	18	12	47	60	−13	42

Source: World Football
Rules for classification: 1) Points; 2) Goal difference; 3) Goals scored

== Results ==
Win	Draw	Loss

=== Football League First Division ===
Date	Opponent	Venue	Result	Attendance	Scorers
21 August 1976	Queen's Park Rangers	A	4–0		Parkes (og), Latchford (2), Bernard (pen)
24 August 1976	Ipswich Town	H	1–1		Telfer
28 August 1976	Aston Villa	H	0–2		
4 September 1976	Leicester City	A	1–1		Latchford
11 September 1976	Stoke City	H	3–0		Telfer (2), Latchford
18 September 1976	Arsenal	A	1–3		Telfer
25 September 1976	Bristol City	H	2–0		Dobson, Latchford
2 October 1976	Sunderland	A	1–0		Goodlass
5 October 1976	Manchester City	H	2–2		Dobson, King
16 October 1976	Liverpool	A	1–3		Dobson
23 October 1976	West Ham United	H	3–2		Lyons, King, Latchford
30 October 1976	Tottenham Hotspur	A	3–3		King, McNaught, Latchford
6 November 1976	Leeds United	H	0–2		
20 November 1976	Derby County	H	2–0		King, Latchford
24 November 1976	Newcastle United	A	1–4		Lyons
27 November 1976	West Bromwich Albion	A	0–3		
11 December 1976	Coventry City	A	2–4		King, Kenyon
18 December 1976	Birmingham City	H	2–2		McKenzie (2, 1 pen)
27 December 1976	Manchester United	A	0–4		
29 December 1976	Middlesbrough	H	2–2		McNaught, Latchford
15 January 1977	Ipswich Town	A	0–2		
22 January 1977	Queen's Park Rangers	H	1–3		McKenzie
5 February 1977	Aston Villa	A	0–2		
12 February 1977	Leicester City	H	1–2		Latchford
19 February 1977	Stoke City	A	1–0		Dobson
1 March 1977	Arsenal	H	2–1		Latchford, Jones
5 March 1977	Bristol City	A	2–1		Latchford, Gillies (og)
22 March 1977	Liverpool	H	0–0		
26 March 1977	Tottenham Hotspur	H	4–0		Latchford, King, Dobson, Lyons
2 April 1977	West Ham United	A	2–2		Goodlass, Pearson
5 April 1977	Manchester United	H	1–2		Dobson
9 April 1977	Middlesbrough	A	2–2		Pearson, Latchford
16 April 1977	Derby County	A	3–2		Latchford, Pejic, McKenzie
19 April 1977	Norwich City	H	3–1		McNaught, King, Pearson
30 April 1977	Norwich City	A	1–2		Pearson
4 May 1977	Leeds United	A	0–0		
7 May 1977	Coventry City	H	1–1		Rioch
10 May 1977	Manchester City	A	1–1		Lyons
14 May 1977	Birmingham City	A	1–1		Latchford
16 May 1977	West Bromwich Albion	H	1–1		Dobson
19 May 1977	Sunderland	H	2–0		Latchford, Rioch
24 May 1977	Newcastle United	H	2–0		Dobson, McKenzie

=== FA Cup ===
Round	Date	Opponent	Venue	Result	Attendance	Goalscorers
3	8 January 1977	Stoke City	H	2–0		Lyons, McKenzie (pen)
4	29 January 1977	Swindon Town	A	2–2		Latchford, McKenzie
4:R	1 February 1977	Swindon Town	H	2–1		Jones, Dobson
5	26 February 1977	Cardiff City	A	2–1		Latchford, McKenzie
6	19 March 1977	Derby County	H	2–0		Latchford, Pearson
SF	23 April 1977	Liverpool	N	2–2	52,637	McKenzie, Rioch
SF:R	27 April 1977	Liverpool	N	0–3	52,579	

=== League Cup ===
Round	Date	Opponent	Venue	Result	Attendance	Goalscorers
2	30 August 1976	Cambridge United	H	3–0		
3	20 September 1976	Stockport County	A	1–0		
4	26 October 1976	Coventry City	H	3–0		
5	1 December 1976	Manchester United	A	3–0		
SF:1	18 January 1977	Bolton Wanderers	H	1–1		
SF:2	15 February 1977	Bolton Wanderers	A	1–0		
F	12 March 1977	Aston Villa	N	0–0	100,000	
F:R	16 March 1977	Aston Villa	N	1–1	55,000	Latchford
F:2R	13 April 1977	Aston Villa	N	2–3	54,749	

== Squad ==
Note: Flags indicate national team as defined under FIFA eligibility rules; some limited exceptions apply. Players may hold more than one non-FIFA nationality.

Pos.	Nation	Player
GK	WAL	Dai Davies
DF	ENG	Terry Darracott
DF	ENG	Dave Jones
DF	ENG	Mick Lyons
DF	SCO	Ken McNaught
MF	SCO	Bruce Rioch
MF	ENG	Andy King
MF	ENG	Martin Dobson
FW	ENG	Bob Latchford
FW	ENG	Duncan McKenzie
MF	ENG	Ronny Goodlass
DF	ENG	Mike Pejic

Pos.	Nation	Player
DF	NIR	Bryan Hamilton
MF	ENG	George Telfer
GK	ENG	Dave Lawson
MF	ENG	Mike Bernard
FW	SCO	Jim Pearson
DF	ENG	Roger Kenyon
MF	ENG	Mick Buckley
DF	ENG	Neil Robinson
DF	ENG	Steve Seargeant
DF	ENG	Mark Higgins
FW	WAL	David Smallman
GK	ENG	Andrew Brand
