= 1977 Football League Cup final =

1977 League Cup final
- Event: 1976–77 Football League Cup
Aston Villa	Everton
- Aston Villa won after a second replay
Aston Villa	Everton
0	0
- Date: 12 March 1977
- Venue: Wembley Stadium, London
- Referee: Gordon Kew
- Attendance: 100,000

Replay
Aston Villa	Everton
1	1
- After extra time
- Date: 16 March 1977
- Venue: Hillsborough Stadium, Sheffield
- Referee: Gordon Kew
- Attendance: 55,000

Second replay
Aston Villa	Everton
3	2
- After extra time
- Date: 13 April 1977
- Venue: Old Trafford, Manchester
- Referee: Gordon Kew
- Attendance: 54,748

The 1977 Football League Cup final was played between Aston Villa and Everton over three games. It was the first League Cup final to go to a replay, and the only one that required a second replay to decide the winner. The first match took place at Wembley Stadium on 12 March and the game ended in a goalless draw. The replay on 16 March was only marginally better as the teams again played out a draw, this time at Hillsborough the home of Sheffield Wednesday. The game ended 1–1 with both goals scored by Everton players with Bob Latchford's last-minute equaliser nullifying Roger Kenyon's earlier own-goal.

The second replay took place at Old Trafford on 13 April. The game is probably best remembered for a 40-yard goal from Villa centre-half Chris Nicholl, and in a 2010 poll this was voted in the top 25 League Cup moments of all-time. Brian Little scored his second of the match in dramatic fashion during the dying seconds of the game to give Villa a 3–2 victory, making them the first team to win the competition three times. Mick Lyons and Bob Latchford scored for Everton.

== Road to Wembley ==
=== Aston Villa ===
Villa defeated top-level teams Manchester City and Norwich City in their first two games, before a 4th round victory over Wrexham moved them into the last eight. Here they defeated second level Millwall 2–0. In the first leg of the semi-final they drew 0–0 at Queens Park Rangers, with the second leg also drawn (2–2), thus setting up a replay. Villa won this game 3–0 on 22 February (at Highbury) courtesy of a Brian Little hat-trick.

=== Everton ===
Conversely Everton's first two victories came against fourth level teams Cambridge United and Stockport County before a 3–0 fourth round victory over First Division Coventry City. In the quarter-finals they enjoyed a 3–0 win at Manchester United, resulting in a semi-final clash with second level Bolton Wanderers. After drawing the home leg, Everton won 1–0 at Burnden Park on 15 February to book their place at Wembley.

== Final ==
=== Match details ===
12 March 1977
15:00 BST

Aston Villa	0–0	Everton

Wembley Stadium, London
Attendance: 100,000
Referee: Gordon Kew (Leeds)

Aston Villa	Everton

GK	1	(England) John Burridge
DF	2	(England) John Gidman
DF	3	(England) John Robson
DF	4	(Wales) Leighton Phillips
DF	5	(Northern Ireland) Chris Nicholl (c)
MF	6	(England) Dennis Mortimer
MF	7	(England) John Deehan
MF	8	(England) Brian Little
FW	9	(Scotland) Andy Gray
MF	10	(Scotland) Alex Cropley
FW	11	(England) Frank Carrodus
Manager:
(England) Ron Saunders

GK	1	(England) David Lawson
DF	2	(England) Dave Jones
DF	3	(England) Terry Darracott
DF	4	(England) Mick Lyons (c)
DF	5	(Scotland) Ken McNaught
MF	6	(England) Andy King
MF	7	(Northern Ireland) Bryan Hamilton
MF	8	(England) Martin Dobson
FW	9	(England) Bob Latchford
FW	10	(England) Duncan McKenzie
MF	11	(England) Ronny Goodlass
Manager:
(England) Gordon Lee

== Replay ==
=== Match details ===
16 March 1977
19:45 BST

Aston Villa	1–1 (a.e.t.)	Everton
Kenyon 79' (o.g.)	Report	Latchford 88'

Hillsborough Stadium, Sheffield
Attendance: 55,000
Referee: Gordon Kew (Leeds)

Aston Villa	Everton

GK	1	(England) John Burridge
DF	2	(England) John Gidman
DF	3	(England) John Robson
DF	4	(Wales) Leighton Phillips
DF	5	(Northern Ireland) Chris Nicholl (c)
MF	6	(England) Dennis Mortimer
MF	7	(England) John Deehan
MF	8	(England) Brian Little
FW	9	(Scotland) Andy Gray
MF	10	(England) Gordon Cowans
FW	11	(England) Frank Carrodus
Manager:
(England) Ron Saunders

GK	1	(England) David Lawson
DF	2	(England) Mike Bernard
DF	3	(England) Terry Darracott
DF	4	(England) Mick Lyons (c)
DF	5	(Scotland) Ken McNaught
MF	6	(England) Andy King
MF	7	(Northern Ireland) Bryan Hamilton
MF	8	(England) Roger Kenyon
FW	9	(England) Bob Latchford
FW	10	(England) Duncan McKenzie
MF	11	(England) Ronny Goodlass
Substitute:
FW	12	(Scotland) Jim Pearson
Manager:
(England) Gordon Lee

For the first replay Villa replaced Cropley with Gordon Cowans, whilst Everton replaced Jones with Mike Bernard and Dobson with Roger Kenyon. Additionally Jim Pearson came on as a substitute for Hamilton. |}

== Second Replay ==
=== Match details ===
13 April 1977
19:30 BST

Aston Villa	3–2 (a.e.t.)	Everton
Nicholl 80'; Little 81', 119'	Report	Latchford 38'; Lyons 83'

Old Trafford, Manchester
Attendance: 54,749
Referee: Gordon Kew (Leeds)

Aston Villa	Everton

GK	1	(England) John Burridge
DF	2	(England) John Gidman
DF	3	(England) John Robson
DF	4	(Wales) Leighton Phillips
DF	5	(Northern Ireland) Chris Nicholl (c)
MF	6	(England) Dennis Mortimer
MF	7	(England) Ray Graydon
FW	8	(England) Brian Little
MF	9	(England) John Deehan
MF	10	(Scotland) Alex Cropley
FW	11	(England) Gordon Cowans
Substitute:
DF	12	(Scotland) Gordon Smith
Manager:
(England) Ron Saunders

GK	1	(England) David Lawson
DF	2	(England) Neil Robinson
DF	3	(England) Terry Darracott
DF	4	(England) Mick Lyons (c)
DF	5	(Scotland) Ken McNaught
MF	6	(England) Andy King
MF	7	(Northern Ireland) Bryan Hamilton
MF	8	(England) Martin Dobson
FW	9	(England) Bob Latchford
FW	10	(Scotland) Jim Pearson
MF	11	(England) Ronny Goodlass
Substitute:
DF	12	(England) Steve Seargeant
Manager:
(England) Gordon Lee

For the second replay the line-ups were as the original game except for Villa Ray Graydon and Gordon Cowans played instead of Gray and Carrodus, and Gordon Smith came on as a substitute for Gidman. Everton were as the original match except Neil Robinson replaced Jones and Jim Pearson replaced McKenzie, whilst Steve Seargeant came on as a sub for Pearson.
