= 1978–79 Everton F.C. season =

English football club season

Everton
1978–79 season
- Manager: Gordon Lee
- Ground: Goodison Park
- First Division: 4th
- FA Cup: Third Round
- League Cup: Fourth Round
- UEFA Cup: Second Round
- Top goalscorer: League: Andy King (12); All: Bob Latchford (20)

During the 1978–79 English football season, Everton F.C. competed in the Football League First Division. They finished 4th in the table with 51 points.

== Final league table ==
Pos	Team	Pld	W	D	L	GF	GA	GD	Pts	Qualification or relegation
2	Nottingham Forest	42	21	18	3	61	26	+35	60	Qualification for the European Cup first round (Note: Nottingham Forest qualified for the European Cup first round as the 1978–79 European Cup winners.)
3	West Bromwich Albion	42	24	11	7	72	35	+37	59	Qualification for the UEFA Cup first round
4	Everton	42	17	17	8	52	40	+12	51	Qualification for the UEFA Cup first round
5	Leeds United	42	18	14	10	70	52	+18	50	Qualification for the UEFA Cup first round
6	Ipswich Town	42	20	9	13	63	49	+14	49	Qualification for the UEFA Cup first round

Source: World Football
Rules for classification: 1) Points; 2) Goal difference; 3) Goals scored

== Results ==
Win	Draw	Loss

=== Football League First Division ===
Date	Opponent	Venue	Result	Attendance	Scorers
19 August 1978	Chelsea	A	1–0	32,683	
22 August 1978	Derby County	H	2–1	40,125	
26 August 1978	Arsenal	H	1–0	41,161	
2 September 1978	Manchester United	A	1–1	53,982	
9 September 1978	Middlesbrough	H	2–0	36,191	
16 September 1978	Aston Villa	A	1–1	38,636	
23 September 1978	Wolverhampton Wanderers	H	2–0	38,895	
30 September 1978	Bristol City	A	2–2	22,502	
7 October 1978	Southampton	H	0–0	38,769	
14 October 1978	Ipswich Town	A	1–0	22,830	
21 October 1978	Queen's Park Rangers	A	1–1	21,171	
28 October 1978	Liverpool	H	1–0	53,141	
4 November 1978	Nottingham Forest	A	0–0	35,515	
11 November 1978	Chelsea	H	3–2	38,346	
18 November 1978	Arsenal	A	2–2	39,711	
21 November 1978	Manchester United	H	3–0	42,126	
25 November 1978	Norwich City	A	1–0	18,930	
9 December 1978	Birmingham City	A	3–1	23,391	
16 December 1978	Leeds United	H	1–1	37,997	
23 December 1978	Coventry City	A	2–3	22,778	
26 December 1978	Manchester City	H	1–0	46,996	
30 December 1978	Tottenham Hotspur	H	1–1	44,572	
31 January 1979	Aston Villa	H	1–1	29,079	
3 February 1979	Wolverhampton Wanderers	A	0–1	21,892	
10 February 1979	Bristol City	H	4–1	29,116	
17 February 1979	Southampton	A	0–3	20,681	
24 February 1979	Ipswich Town	H	0–1	29,031	
3 March 1979	Queen's Park Rangers	H	2–1	24,809	
6 March 1979	Middlesbrough	A	2–1	16,084	
10 March 1979	Nottingham Forest	H	1–1	37,745	
13 March 1979	Liverpool	A	1–1	52,352	
24 March 1979	Derby County	A	0–0	20,814	
30 March 1979	Norwich City	H	2–2	26,825	
3 April 1979	Bolton Wanderers	A	1–3	27,263	
7 April 1979	West Bromwich Albion	A	0–1	29,593	
10 April 1979	Coventry City	H	3–3	25,302	
14 April 1979	Manchester City	A	0–0	39,711	
16 April 1979	Bolton Wanderers	H	1–0	31,214	
21 April 1979	Leeds United	A	0–1	29,125	
28 April 1979	Birmingham City	H	1–0	23,049	
1 May 1979	West Bromwich Albion	H	0–2	30,083	
5 May 1979	Tottenham Hotspur	A	1–1	26,077	

=== FA Cup ===
Round	Date	Opponent	Venue	Result	Attendance	Goalscorers
3	10 January 1979	Sunderland	A	1–2	28,602	

=== League Cup ===
Round	Date	Opponent	Venue	Result	Attendance	Goalscorers
2	29 August 1978	Wimbledon	H	8–0	23,137	
3	3 October 1978	Darlington	H	1–0	23,682	
4	7 November 1978	Nottingham Forest	H	2–3	48,503	

=== UEFA Cup ===
Round	Date	Opponent	Venue	Result	Attendance	Goalscorers
1:1	29 August 1978	(Republic of Ireland) Finn Harps	A	5–0	5,000	
1:1	29 August 1978	(Republic of Ireland) Finn Harps	H	5–0	21,611	
2:1	18 October 1978	(Czechoslovakia) Dukla Prague	H	2–1	32,857	
2:2	1 November 1978	(Czechoslovakia) Dukla Prague	A	0–1	35,000	

== Squad ==
Note: Flags indicate national team as defined under FIFA eligibility rules; some limited exceptions apply. Players may hold more than one non-FIFA nationality.

Pos.	Nation	Player
GK	SCO	George Wood
DF	ENG	Colin Todd
DF	ENG	Mike Pejic
DF	ENG	Mick Lyons
DF	ENG	Billy Wright
MF	ENG	Trevor Ross
MF	ENG	Andy King
MF	ENG	Martin Dobson
FW	ENG	Bob Latchford
FW	ENG	Mickey Walsh
MF	ENG	Dave Thomas

Pos.	Nation	Player
DF	ENG	Mark Higgins
MF	ENG	Geoff Nulty
MF	ENG	George Telfer
DF	ENG	Dave Jones
DF	ENG	John Barton
MF	ENG	Pat Heard
FW	ENG	Brian Kidd
DF	ENG	Terry Darracott
FW	ENG	Peter Eastoe
DF	ENG	Neil Robinson
DF	ENG	Roger Kenyon
FW	SCO	Ross Jack
