= 1974–75 Everton F.C. season =

English football club season

Everton
1974–75 season
- Manager: Billy Bingham
- Ground: Goodison Park
- First Division: 4th
- FA Cup: Fifth Round
- League Cup: Second Round
- Top goalscorer: League: Bob Latchford (17); All: Bob Latchford (19)
Home colours	Away colours

During the 1974–75 English football season, Everton F.C. competed in the Football League First Division. They finished 4th in the table with 50 points.

== Final league table ==
Pos	Team	Pld	W	D	L	GF	GA	GAv	Pts	Qualification or relegation
2	Liverpool	42	20	11	11	60	39	1.538	51	Qualification for the UEFA Cup first round
3	Ipswich Town	42	23	5	14	66	44	1.500	51	Qualification for the UEFA Cup first round
4	Everton	42	16	18	8	56	42	1.333	50	Qualification for the UEFA Cup first round
5	Stoke City	42	17	15	10	64	48	1.333	49	
6	Sheffield United	42	18	13	11	58	51	1.137	49	

Source: World Football
Rules for classification: 1) Points; 2) Goal average; 3) Goals scored

== Results ==
Win	Draw	Loss

=== Football League First Division ===
Date	Opponent	Venue	Result	Scorers	Attendance
17 August 1974	Derby County	Home	0–0		42,293
20 August 1974	Stoke City	Home	2–1	Royle 31' pen., 73'	35,817
24 August 1974	West Ham United	Away	3–2	Royle 41' pen., Latchford 45', Harvey 82'	22,486
28 August 1974	Stoke City	Away	1–1	Latchford 54'	27,954
31 August 1974	Arsenal	Home	2–1	Latchford 47', 52'	42,438
7 September 1974	Ipswich Town	Away	0–1		23,393
14 September 1974	Wolverhampton Wanderers	Home	0–0		36,875
21 September 1974	Coventry City	Away	1–1	Latchford 58'	15,217
24 September 1974	Queens Park Rangers	Away	2–2	Latchford 52', Pearson 90'	16,638
28 September 1974	Leeds United	Home	3–2	Seargeant 26', Lyons 33', Clements 56'	41,824
5 October 1974	Newcastle United	Home	1–1	Buckley 55'	40,000
12 October 1974	Sheffield United	Away	2–2	Lyons 55', Buckley 74'	23,655
15 October 1974	West Ham United	Home	1–1	Lyons 58'	31,882
19 October 1974	Chelsea	Home	1–1	G. Jones 84' pen.	35,806
26 October 1974	Burnley	Away	1–1	G. Jones 36'	22,599
2 November 1974	Manchester City	Home	2–0	Connolly 7', G. Jones 85'	43,905
9 November 1974	Tottenham Hotspur	Away	1–1	Connolly 44'	29,052
16 November 1974	Liverpool	Home	0–0		57,190
30 November 1974	Birmingham City	Home	4–1	G. Jones 17', Dobson 40', Lyons 73', Connolly 87'	38,369
7 December 1974	Leicester City	Away	2–0	Hurst 18', Telfer 88'	21,451
14 December 1974	Derby County	Away	1–0	Latchford 66'	24,891
21 December 1974	Carlisle United	Home	2–3	Latchford 7', 51'	33,489
26 December 1974	Wolverhampton Wanderers	Away	0–2		33,120
28 December 1974	Middlesbrough	Home	1–1	Latchford 47'	41,105
11 January 1975	Leicester City	Home	3–0	G. Jones 12', Pearson 15', Lyons 72'	31,985
18 January 1975	Birmingham City	Away	3–0	Styles 62' o.g., Latchford 72', 77'	32,284
1 February 1975	Tottenham Hotspur	Home	1–0	Pearson 80'	40,912
8 February 1975	Manchester City	Away	1–2	Horswill 81' o.g.	44,718
22 February 1975	Liverpool	Away	0–0		55,853
25 February 1975	Luton Town	Home	3–1	Telfer 15', Dobson 27', Latchford 52'	35,714
1 March 1975	Arsenal	Away	2–0	Dobson 65', Lyons 68'	32,216
8 March 1975	Queens Park Rangers	Home	2–1	Lyons 48', Latchford 90'	39,567
15 March 1975	Leeds United	Away	0–0		50,084
18 March 1975	Middlesbrough	Away	0–2		32,813
22 March 1975	Ipswich Town	Home	1–1	Lyons 68'	46,269
29 March 1975	Carlisle United	Away	0–3		16,049
31 March 1975	Coventry City	Home	1–0	Dobson 45'	39,770
4 April 1975	Burnley	Home	1–1	Latchford 58'	46,882
9 April 1975	Luton Town	Away	1–2	Latchford 20'	13,437
12 April 1975	Newcastle United	Away	1–0	Dobson 53'	29,585
19 April 1975	Sheffield United	Home	2–3	Smallman 24', G. Jones 30' pen.	38,348
26 April 1975	Chelsea	Away	1–1	Latchford 70'	28,432

=== League Cup ===
Round	Date	Opponent	Venue	Result	Scorers	Attendance
2nd Round	11 September 1974	Aston Villa	Away	1–1	Latchford 49'	29,640
2nd Round Replay	18 September 1974	Aston Villa	Home	0–3		24,595

=== FA Cup ===
Round	Date	Opponent	Venue	Result	Scorers	Attendance
3rd Round	4 January 1975	Altrincham	Home	1–1	G. Jones 69' pen.	34,519
3rd Round Replay	7 January 1975	Altrincham	Away	2–0	Latchford 26', Lyons 52'	35,530
4th Round	25 January 1975	Plymouth Argyle	Away	3–1	Pearson 7', Lyons 37', 76'	38,000
5th Round	15 February 1975	Fulham	Home	1–2	Kenyon 52'	45,233
