= 1977–78 Everton F.C. season =

English football club season

Everton
1977–78 season
- Manager: Gordon Lee
- Ground: Goodison Park
- First Division: 3rd
- FA Cup: Fourth Round
- League Cup: Fifth Round
- Top goalscorer: League: Bob Latchford (30); All: Bob Latchford (32)

During the 1977–78 English football season, Everton F.C. competed in the Football League First Division. They finished 3rd in the table with 55 points.

== Final league table ==
Pos	Team	Pld	W	D	L	GF	GA	GD	Pts	Qualification or relegation
1	Nottingham Forest (C)	42	25	14	3	69	24	+45	64	Qualification for the European Cup first round (Note: Liverpool qualified for the European Cup first round as the 1977–78 European Cup winners.)
2	Liverpool	42	24	9	9	65	34	+31	57	Qualification for the European Cup first round
3	Everton	42	22	11	9	76	45	+31	55	Qualification for the UEFA Cup first round
4	Manchester City	42	20	12	10	74	51	+23	52	Qualification for the UEFA Cup first round
5	Arsenal	42	21	10	11	60	37	+23	52	Qualification for the UEFA Cup first round

Source: World Football
Rules for classification: 1) Points; 2) Goal difference; 3) Goals scored
(C) Champions

== Results ==
Win	Draw	Loss

=== Football League First Division ===
Date	Opponent	Venue	Result	Attendance	Scorers
20 August 1977	Nottingham Forest	H	1–3	38,001	Pearson
23 August 1977	Arsenal	A	0–1	32,954	
27 August 1977	Aston Villa	A	2–1	37,805	McKenzie (2)
3 September 1977	Wolverhampton Wanderers	H	0–0	36,636	
10 September 1977	Leicester City	A	5–1	16,425	Latchford, Thomas, King (2), McKenzie
17 September 1977	Norwich City	H	3–0	34,405	Rioch, McKenzie, Dobson
24 September 1977	West Ham United	A	1–1	25,296	McKenzie
1 October 1977	Manchester City	H	1–1	43,286	Latchford
4 October 1977	West Bromwich Albion	H	3–1	34,582	Higgins, King (pen), Latchford
8 October 1977	Queens Park Rangers	A	5–1	20,495	Latchford (4), McKenzie
15 October 1977	Bristol City	H	1–0	39,230	King
22 October 1977	Liverpool	A	0–0	51,668	
29 October 1977	Newcastle United	H	4–4	37,574	Pejic, Latchford (2), Lyons
5 November 1977	Derby County	A	1–0	29,335	Lyons
12 November 1977	Birmingham City	H	2–1	37,783	Latchford (2)
19 November 1977	Ipswich Town	A	3–3	22,795	Lyons, Pearson, Buckley
26 November 1977	Coventry City	H	6–0	43,279	Dobson, Latchford (3), Pearson, King
3 December 1977	Chelsea	A	1–0	33,899	Latchford
10 December 1977	Middlesbrough	H	3–0	38,387	Latchford (2), Buckley
17 December 1977	Birmingham City	A	0–0	22,177	
26 December 1977	Manchester United	H	2–6	48,335	Latchford, Dobson
27 December 1977	Leeds United	A	1–3	45,560	Dobson
31 December 1977	Arsenal	H	2–0	47,039	Latchford, King
2 January 1978	Nottingham Forest	A	1–1	44,030	Ross (pen)
14 January 1978	Aston Villa	H	1–0	40,630	King
21 January 1978	Wolverhampton Wanderers	A	1–3	23,777	Ross (pen)
4 February 1978	Leicester City	H	2–0	33,677	Latchford (2)
18 February 1978	West Ham United	H	2–1	33,862	McKenzie, Thomas
25 February 1978	Manchester City	A	0–1	46,817	
4 March 1978	Queens Park Rangers	H	3–3	33,861	Ross, Dobson, King
11 March 1978	Bristol City	A	1–0	25,986	Ross
15 March 1978	Norwich City	A	0–0	19,502	
24 March 1978	Newcastle United	A	2–0	27,103	Latchford, McKenzie
25 March 1978	Leeds United	H	2–0	45,020	Latchford, McKenzie
27 March 1978	Manchester United	A	2–1	55,317	Latchford (2)
1 April 1978	Derby County	H	2–1	38,213	Dobson, Latchford
5 April 1978	Liverpool	H	0–1	52,759	
8 April 1978	Coventry City	A	2–3	26,025	Latchford, Lyons
15 April 1978	Ipswich Town	H	1–0	33,402	Latchford (pen)
22 April 1978	Middlesbrough	A	0–0	15,969	
25 April 1978	West Bromwich Albion	A	1–3	20,247	Telfer
29 April 1978	Chelsea	H	6–0	39,504	Dobson, Wright, Robinson, Lyons, Latchford (2, 1 pen)

=== FA Cup ===
Round	Date	Opponent	Venue	Result	Attendance	Scorers
3	7 January 1978	Aston Villa	H	4–1	46,320	King, Ross (pen), McKenzie, Latchford
4	28 January 1978	Middlesbrough	A	2–3	33,692	Telfer, Lyons

=== League Cup ===
Round	Date	Opponent	Venue	Result	Attendance	Scorers
2	30 August 1977	Sheffield United	A	3–0	18,571	Latchford, McKenzie, King
3	25 October 1977	Middlesbrough	H	2–2	32,766	King, Telfer
3:R	31 October 1977	Middlesbrough	A	2–1	28,500	Lyons, Pearson
4	29 November 1977	Sheffield Wednesday	A	3–1	36,079	Lyons, Dobson, Pearson
5	18 January 1978	Leeds United	A	1–4	35,020	Thomas
