= 1979–80 Everton F.C. season =

English football club season

Everton
1979–80 season
- Chairman: Philip Carter
- Manager: Gordon Lee
- Ground: Goodison Park
- First Division: 19th
- FA Cup: Semi-Final
- League Cup: Fourth Round
- UEFA Cup: First Round
- Top goalscorer: League: Brian Kidd (10); All: Brian Kidd (18)

During the 1979–80 English football season, Everton F.C. competed in the Football League First Division. They finished 19th in the table with 35 points.

== Review ==
18 August 1979: Everton become the first team to wear a sponsored shirt in a Football League match when they wore their Hafnia sponsored shirts against Norwich City at Goodison Park. The only other side with a sponsored shirt in this season, Liverpool didn't play their first Football League match until 3 days later, on 21 August 1979. Although Liverpool played their first match of the season in the Charity Shield the week before, the match was televised, thus Liverpool played in non-sponsored shirts.

13 October 1979: Crystal Palace's unbeaten start to the season ends with a 3–1 defeat to Everton at Goodison Park.

October 1979: John Gidman is signed from Aston Villa for £650,000 (2013: £2,900,000) in a deal which sees midfielder Pat Heard move the other way at a valuation of £100,000.

29 February 1980: With the season approaching its final quarter, Manchester United have moved level on points at the top of the First Division with Liverpool, who have a game in hand. Bolton Wanderers remain bottom, with just one League win from their first 27 matches, and Derby County and Bristol City also remain in the relegation zone, with Everton occupying the last safe spot.

1 March 1980: Everton lose 2–1 at home to Liverpool in the First Division Merseyside derby, and during the game their legendary former striker Dixie Dean dies from a heart attack in the stands, aged 73.

8 March 1980: Second Division West Ham United, having beaten Aston Villa 1–0 in the FA Cup sixth round, are joined in the last four by Liverpool, Everton and holders Arsenal.

12 April 1980: Both FA Cup semi-finals – Arsenal versus Liverpool and Everton versus West Ham United – end in draws.

16 April 1980: West Ham United beat Everton 2–1 at Elland Road to reach the FA Cup final.

== Final league table ==
Pos	Team	Pld	W	D	L	GF	GA	GD	Pts	Qualification or relegation
17	Manchester City	42	12	13	17	43	66	−23	37	
18	Stoke City	42	13	10	19	44	58	−14	36	
19	Everton	42	9	17	16	43	51	−8	35	
20	Bristol City (R)	42	9	13	20	37	66	−29	31	Relegation to the Second Division
21	Derby County (R)	42	11	8	23	47	67	−20	30	Relegation to the Second Division

Source: World Football
Rules for classification: 1) Points; 2) Goal difference; 3) Goals scored
(R) Relegated

== Results ==
Win	Draw	Loss

=== Football League First Division ===
Date	Opponent	Venue	Result	Attendance	Scorers
18 August 1979	Norwich City	H	2–4	27,555	Ross 14' (pen), Nulty 39'
22 August 1979	Leeds United	A	0–2	27,783	
25 August 1979	Derby County	A	1–0	17,820	King 29'
1 September 1979	Aston Villa	H	1–1	29,271	Bailey 84'
8 September 1979	Stoke City	A	3–2	23,460	King 12', Bailey 14', Irvine (og) 84'
15 September 1979	Wolverhampton Wanderers	H	2–3	31,807	Kidd 19', Ross 63' (pen)
22 September 1979	Ipswich Town	A	1–1	19,279	Kidd 9'
29 September 1979	Bristol City	H	0–0	24,733	
6 October 1979	Coventry City	A	1–2	17,205	King 78'
13 October 1979	Crystal Palace	H	3–1	30,645	Kidd 35', Latchford 52', King 67'
20 October 1979	Liverpool	A	2–2	52,201	Kidd 18', King 67'
27 October 1979	Manchester United	H	0–0	37,708	
3 November 1979	Norwich City	A	0–0	18,025	
10 November 1979	Middlesbrough	H	0–2	25,155	
13 November 1979	Leeds United	H	5–1	23,319	Latchford 6', 22', 43', Kidd 17', Hart (og) 83'
17 November 1979	Arsenal	A	0–2	33,450	
24 November 1979	Tottenham Hotspur	H	1–1	31,079	Latchford 26'
1 December 1979	West Bromwich Albion	A	1–1	21,237	King 16'
8 December 1979	Brighton & Hove Albion	H	2–0	23,595	King 16', Kidd 34'
15 December 1979	Southampton	A	0–1	19,850	
22 December 1979	Manchester City	H	1–2	26,314	Kidd 64'
26 December 1979	Bolton Wanderers	A	1–1	18,220	McBride 79'
29 December 1979	Derby County	H	1–1	22,554	King 77'
1 January 1980	Nottingham Forest	H	1–0	34,622	Kidd 24'
12 January 1980	Aston Villa	A	1–2	31,108	Eastoe 87'
2 February 1980	Wolverhampton Wanderers	A	0–0	21,663	
9 February 1980	Ipswich Town	H	0–4	31,603	
19 February 1980	Bristol City	A	1–2	16,317	Ross 45'
23 February 1980	Crystal Palace	A	1–1	22,857	Eastoe 51'
1 March 1980	Liverpool	H	1–2	53,018	Eastoe 73'
12 March 1980	Manchester United	A	0–0	45,515	
15 March 1980	Coventry City	H	1–1	25,970	Eastoe 9'
18 March 1980	Stoke City	H	2–0	23,847	Latchford 69', Eastoe 80'
22 March 1980	Middlesbrough	A	1–2	17,587	Hartford 67'
28 March 1980	Arsenal	H	0–1	28,184	
2 April 1980	Manchester City	A	1–1	33,437	King 67'
5 April 1980	Bolton Wanderers	H	3–1	28,037	Megson 14', Eastoe 40', Kidd 60'
19 April 1980	Tottenham Hotspur	A	0–3	25,245	
26 April 1980	Southampton	H	2–0	23,552	Stanley 65', Gidman (pen) 72'
28 April 1980	West Bromwich Albion	H	0–0	20,356	
3 May 1980	Brighton & Hove Albion	A	0–0	21,204	
9 May 1980	Nottingham Forest	A	0–1	22,122	

=== FA Cup ===
Round	Date	Opponent	Venue	Result	Attendance	Goalscorers
3	5 January 1980	Aldershot	H	4–1	23,700	Latchford 6', Hartford 22', King 60', Kidd 74'
4	26 January 1980	Wigan Athletic	H	3–0	51,863	McBride 31', Latchford 71', Kidd 76'
5	16 February 1980	Wrexham	H	5–2	44,830	Megson 6', Eastoe 48', 80', Ross (pen) 68', Latchford 76'
6	8 March 1980	Ipswich Town	H	2–1	45,104	Latchford 29', Kidd 77'
SF	12 April 1980	West Ham United	N	1–1 (aet)	47,685	Kidd (pen) 42'
SF:R	16 April 1980	West Ham United	N	1–2 (aet)	40,720	Latchford 114'

=== League Cup ===
Round	Date	Opponent	Venue	Result	Attendance	Goalscorers
2:1	28 August 1979	Cardiff City	H	2–0	18,061	Kidd 26', 66'
2:2	5 September 1979	Cardiff City	A	0–1	18,061	
3	25 September 1979	Aston Villa	A	0–0	22,635	
3:R	9 October 1979	Aston Villa	H	4–1	22,088	Kidd 6', Latchford 12', 71', Rimmer (og) 76'
4	30 October 1979	Grimsby Town	A	1–2	22,043	Kidd 21'

=== UEFA Cup ===
Round	Date	Opponent	Venue	Result	Attendance	Goalscorers
1:1	19 September 1979	(Netherlands) Feyenoord	A	0–1	37,000	
1:2	3 October 1979	(Netherlands) Feyenoord	H	0–1	28,203	

== Squad ==
Note: Flags indicate national team as defined under FIFA eligibility rules; some limited exceptions apply. Players may hold more than one non-FIFA nationality.

Pos.	Nation	Player
GK	ENG	Martin Hodge
DF	ENG	John Gidman
DF	ENG	John Bailey
DF	ENG	Billy Wright
DF	ENG	Mick Lyons
MF	ENG	Trevor Ross
MF	SCO	Asa Hartford
FW	ENG	Peter Eastoe
FW	ENG	Bob Latchford
FW	ENG	Brian Kidd
MF	ENG	Andy King
MF	ENG	Gary Stanley

Pos.	Nation	Player
DF	ENG	Mark Higgins
GK	SCO	George Wood
MF	SCO	Joe McBride
MF	ENG	Gary Megson
MF	ENG	Geoff Nulty
DF	ENG	John Barton
MF	IRL	Eamonn O'Keefe
DF	ENG	Colin Todd
FW	ENG	Imre Varadi
DF	WAL	Kevin Ratcliffe
FW	SCO	Graeme Sharp
MF	ENG	Pat Heard

== Deaths ==
- 1 March 1980 – Dixie Dean, 73, legendary Everton striker who scored 60 league goals in the 1927–28 season; died on 1 March after suffering a heart attack while watching Everton's game against Liverpool at Goodison Park.
