= Bill Salisbury =

Bill Salisbury may refer to:

- Solly Salisbury (1876–1952), Major League Baseball pitcher
- Bill Salisbury (footballer) (born 1899), Scottish footballer
