= Dave Jones (footballer, born 1956) =

English footballer and manager

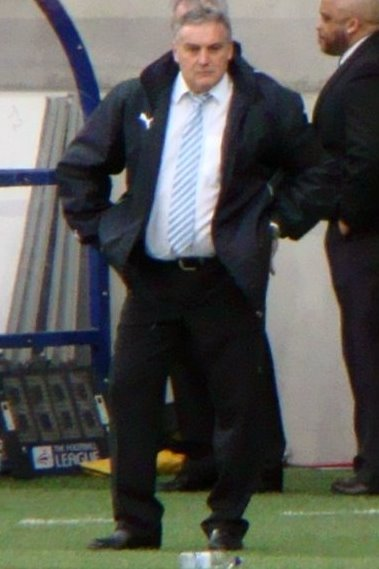
- Jones as manager of Cardiff City in 2010

Personal information
- Full name: David Ronald Jones
- Date of birth: 17 August 1956 (age 70)
- Place of birth: Liverpool, England
- Position: Defender

Senior career*
Years	Team	Apps	(Gls)
1974–1979	Everton	86	(1)
1979–1982	Coventry City	11	(0)
1981	→ Seiko (loan)		
1982–1983	Seiko		
1983–1984	Preston North End	50	(1)
Total		147	(2)

International career
1975	England Youth	1	(0)
1976	England U21	1	(0)

Managerial career
- 1995–1997: Stockport County
- 1997–2000: Southampton
- 2001–2004: Wolverhampton Wanderers
- 2005–2011: Cardiff City
- 2012–2013: Sheffield Wednesday
- 2017: Hartlepool United
- * Club domestic league appearances and goals

David Ronald Jones (born 17 August 1956) is an English former footballer and manager.

Jones played for Everton, Coventry and Preston North End as a defender. In 1995, he became the manager of Stockport County, guiding the team to a League Cup semi-final and automatic promotion to the second tier of English football in 1997.

He left Stockport to become the manager of Southampton in the Premier League, where he stayed for over 100 games until he was suspended by the club in January 2000, after his arrest on charges of child abuse. When the case came to court in December 2000, the judge recorded not guilty verdicts on all the charges. Jones later spoke of his bitterness about the handling of the case and said it was the cause of his father's death, who had died shortly after the allegations became public.

In 2001, Jones became the manager of Wolverhampton Wanderers, guiding the club to promotion to the Premier League in the 2002–03 season, though they were relegated the following season and he was dismissed by Wolves in November 2004.

Jones had a six-year spell in charge of Cardiff City between 2005 and 2011. They reached the FA Cup final in 2008, losing 1–0 to Portsmouth. Cardiff lost the 2010 Championship Play-off Final 3–2 against Blackpool. After failing to achieve promotion with Cardiff, losing to Reading the following season in a play-off semi-final, Jones was dismissed by the club on 30 May 2011.

He was appointed manager of Sheffield Wednesday on 1 March 2012, guiding the club to finishing second in League One, thus gaining automatic promotion to the Championship. Jones was dismissed by Wednesday in December 2013. After a three-year absence from management, he was appointed manager at Hartlepool United in January 2017.

== Playing career ==
Jones started his professional career with Everton in his home city of Liverpool. He played as a defender with the team for seven years, during which time he represented England at youth and under-21 level.

He left Everton to play for Coventry City in 1979 for a transfer fee of £250,000 – after three seasons he picked up a knee injury which threatened to end his football career.

After recovering from this injury, he played two further seasons for Seiko in Hong Kong and one season for Preston North End before retiring. Jones first went to Hong Kong on 2 April 1981 on loan from Coventry City for the remainder of the season, teammate Jim Hagan had already settled in the squad. At the end of the season, Seiko won the league championship for the third time in a row as well as the Hong Kong FA Cup.

After his release from Coventry City, Jones joined Seiko on a permanent basis at the start of the 1982–83 season, playing 22 games for Seiko during the season, including a friendly with a "Brazil Stars Team" on 12 December 1982, the game ended 0–0 and was decided by penalties. Jones took and scored a penalty, but Seiko went on to lose 3–2. He was also selected in the squad of Hong Kong League XI, led by Dutch coach George Knobel, to face French side Monaco on 9 January 1982, which ended in a 1–0 win for the Hong Kong League XI.

After retiring from professional football he went on to become assistant manager to Bryan Griffiths at Southport, where he also made two appearances as a player, before they both left and took up identical roles at Mossley for the 1988–89 season. He made two appearances for Mossley whilst at the club.

== Managerial career ==
=== Stockport County ===
In July 1990, he joined Stockport County as a manager for their youth team and took over as first-team manager from Danny Bergara in March 1995. He took the team into the First Division from an automatic promotion place in 1997. He also took the club to the semi-finals of the League Cup where they were narrowly defeated 2–1 on aggregate by Middlesbrough despite an impressive win at the Riverside Stadium. During the same cup run, Stockport also defeated Sheffield United, Blackburn Rovers, Southampton and West Ham United, all of whom were in higher divisions than the club at the time.

=== Southampton ===
This promotion brought him to the attention of Southampton, who offered him a contract to manage their Premier League team. His reign during the 1999–2000 season was rocked by his arrest on charges of child abuse during his employment as a care worker in the late 1980s.

The case put tremendous strain on Jones, who was forced to defend his case on Merseyside whilst managing a team based over 200 miles away on the south coast. In January 2000, Southampton decided to suspend him on full pay until the case was resolved, with Glenn Hoddle taking over his managerial duties.

When the case eventually came to court, it was thrown out in its first week, with the judge recording a not guilty verdict and commenting that the case "should have never reached the trial stage". Southampton paid off the remainder of Jones' contract and he left the club. Jones contended that this amounted to unfair dismissal and took the case to industrial tribunal, but Southampton's decision was upheld.

=== Wolverhampton Wanderers ===
Jones took over at Wolverhampton Wanderers, signing a three-year contract on 3 January 2001. The side were then sitting 12th in the First Division, after a poor first half to the season under Colin Lee. Results continued to remain indifferent though and the side eventually finished 12th.

The summer of 2001 saw Jones undertake a large overhaul of the playing squad in the pursuit of promotion. He spent over £7 million – the largest spending in the club's history in one transfer period – bringing in the likes of Nathan Blake, Colin Cameron, Mark Kennedy, Alex Rae and Shaun Newton. Additional firepower was also later purchased in Kenny Miller and a cut-price Dean Sturridge.

The only major disappointment from the players Jones signed as he rejuvenated Wolves was Belgian striker Cédric Roussel, a £1.5million signing from Coventry City in February 2001. Roussel was one of the most expensive players ever signed by Wolves but he played just 27 times and scored twice in 18 months.

Jones's new-look team quickly made an impact, hitting the top of the league by late September, and remaining in the automatic promotion spots over the following months. He won the Division One Manager of the Month Award in February 2002, as part of a sequence of ten wins from eleven games. By mid-March, they sat in second place, with an eleven point lead over their arch-rivals and nearest challengers West Bromwich Albion.

However, the final nine games saw Wolves take just ten points from 27 available, while Albion, in contrast, won eight of their final ten fixtures to overtake their rivals and pip them to promotion on the final day of the season. Jones suffered more disappointment when his side compounded their poor end to the campaign by losing their play-off semi-final to Norwich City.

The following season proved a similar rollercoaster ride for Jones. Inconsistent early form left them well off the pace for automatic promotion and a dismal Christmas period saw him under increasing pressure as they weren't even in the playoff zone. An FA Cup win over top flight Newcastle United seemed to reverse fortunes though, and his side lost just two of their remaining twenty games to finish fifth, in the play-off zone. The FA Cup run lasted until the quarter-finals.

They overcame Reading in the semi-finals and 3–0 victory over Sheffield United in the final at Millennium Stadium, Cardiff, saw Jones become the manager who returned Wolves to the top level of English football for the first time since 1984, and the man who achieved the chairman Jack Hayward's ambition of Premier League football after eleven years, millions of pounds spent on players and four previous managers.

Jones had just £4 million to spend in the summer preparing for Premier League football. However, the team was significantly weakened by long-term injuries to Joleon Lescott and Matt Murray, and began the season missing several other key components of their promotion campaign. The side endured a very poor start to the campaign, shipping nine goals in two games, and remaining winless until their eighth match. Although, he oversaw several impressive results – most notably defeating a full strength Manchester United 1–0 in the league on 17 January 2004 – his side was mired in the relegation zone for almost all the season and was duly relegated in 20th place with 33 points. They only won eight league games all season, and failed to win a single away game.

Their relegation was effectively confirmed on 1 May despite an impressive win over Everton, which left them needing a mathematical miracle to finish outside the bottom three, and the following weekend their survival became mathematically impossible.

Jones aimed for an immediate return to the Premier League in 2004–05, but had to begin the season once again under a cloud of injuries. His squad was now ageing, with most of the players bought as experienced pros in 2001 still forming the core. The side failed to live up to expectations and managed just four wins from the first fifteen games, leaving them 17th. As pressure mounted, he was sacked on 1 November 2004, after a final loss against a Gillingham side reduced to ten men, a side who had been on the receiving end of a 6–0 Wolves victory in their previous meeting just before the promotion 18 months earlier.

=== Cardiff City ===
During Jones' first season in charge of Cardiff City, they achieved a respectable 11th place in the Championship. Re-building over the summer of 2006, Jones forged a talented side who found themselves at the top of the Championship. However, after a strong start, poor form later in the season led to Cardiff City finishing the season in 13th.

On 29 September 2007, Jones was sent to the stands during a league match against Barnsley after criticising referee Phil Dowd over a penalty decision. He was formally charged with misconduct on 2 October. Jones countered by claiming: "I was angry with the referee because I think he was the only person in the stadium that didn't think it was a penalty. He didn't make a big call."

He also complained that Dowd ordered him into a section of the stadium containing Barnsley fans and feared that his safety had been put at risk. He faced an FAW hearing about the incident and was found guilty, resulting in a two-match touchline ban, which he served in the Championship match against Plymouth Argyle and the third round FA Cup tie against Chasetown.

On 9 March 2008, Jones led Cardiff to their first FA Cup semi-final tie since 1927 after beating Premier League side Middlesbrough 2–0 in the quarter-finals. On 6 April, Cardiff City beat Barnsley 1–0 at Wembley to book an FA Cup Final place against Portsmouth. Cardiff City lost the final, played on 17 May 2008, with the only goal of the game being scored by Nwankwo Kanu for Portsmouth after 37 minutes.

The start of the 2008–09 season saw veterans Jimmy Floyd Hasselbaink, Robbie Fowler and Trevor Sinclair released and the sales of some of the team's biggest assets in Glenn Loovens and Aaron Ramsey. Despite this, Jones brought in several new faces and by November Cardiff found themselves in a play-off spot, earning Jones the Championship manager of the month for October. However, after spending the majority of the season in a play-off position, the side missed out on the final day of the season after suffering a 1–0 defeat against Sheffield Wednesday. Despite missing out on the play-offs, Jones had led Cardiff to their highest league position for 38 years.

The start of the 2009–10 season saw Cardiff in top form, beating Scunthorpe United 4–0 putting them top. In the first five games, Cardiff were only in the top two until a 1–0 defeat against Newcastle United which put Cardiff eighth. On 7 November 2009, Jones earned the Championship Manager of the Month for October, the same day Cardiff lost the first South Wales derby 3–2 at Liberty Stadium. At the end of the season, Jones took Cardiff to their highest finish in the league in 39 years, fourth place, meaning they would take part in the play-offs. Cardiff beat Leicester at the Walkers Stadium 1–0, thanks to Peter Whittingham's free kick but lost the second leg 3–2, resulting in extra time. The match eventually went to penalties with Cardiff winning 4–3. In the Play-off Final at Wembley, Cardiff suffered a 3–2 defeat to Blackpool.

In the 2010–11 season, Cardiff started the season with four wins out of five games. By the end of October, Cardiff had only lost two games and Jones received the October Championship Manager of the Month, whilst leading scorer Jay Bothroyd won Player of the Month. The club suffered a big loss of form in November and December, with only two wins out of nine games. They finished the season in fourth place behind rivals Swansea City. Cardiff then faced fifth placed Reading in the play-off semi-final, where they lost 3–0 on aggregate.

Jones was later sacked from Cardiff City on 30 May 2011.

=== Sheffield Wednesday ===
Jones was appointed Sheffield Wednesday boss on 1 March 2012, replacing Gary Megson who was sacked the day before.

His first official game in charge was against Bury and Wednesday came out 4–1 winners, the following game ended with a 3–0 win after three goals in the first ten minutes. After leading Wednesday to five wins and a draw during his first month in charge, Jones was awarded League One Manager of the Month for March 2012. Jones then led Wednesday to another five wins and a draw during his second month in charge and was awarded the Manager of the Month award for April 2012. On 5 May 2012, Jones led Wednesday to promotion from Football League One to the Championship after beating Wycombe Wanderers 2–0.

Jones' first game in charge of Sheffield Wednesday in the Championship was a 2–2 draw away to Derby on 18 August 2012. Two home wins in the next two matches and a League Cup victory over Premier League side Fulham saw Jones stretch his unbeaten start as Sheffield Wednesday manager to eighteen matches. Jones' first defeat eventually came on 1 September 2012 after eighteen games unbeaten, a 2–1 loss away to Crystal Palace. Jones returned to his former side Cardiff for the first time as Sheffield Wednesday manager on 2 December 2012, losing 1–0.

In February 2013, Jones was fined £2,000 and given a one-match touchline ban by the FA for misconduct after a fracas on the touchline with Brighton & Hove Albion coach Charlie Oatway during Wednesday's 3–1 victory over Brighton. Jones later said that he disagreed with his fine and described Oatway as a "nobody".

Jones was dismissed on 1 December 2013, with the club second from bottom in the Championship, having won only one league match all season.

=== Hartlepool United ===
On 18 January 2017, Jones returned to football management when he joined Hartlepool United of League Two. Jones joined with the North-East club 19th in the table and four points clear of the relegation zone. Jones lost his first game as Pools manager 3–1 to bottom of the table side Newport County. Hartlepool's form deteriorated further, winning only 13 points from a potential 51, and left the club by mutual consent on 24 April 2017.

During Jones' last match in charge of Hartlepool, club president Jeff Stelling urged him to quit, in an impassioned speech on Soccer Saturday, following a home defeat to Barnet which had placed Hartlepool in the bottom two. Notified of this public criticism afterwards, Jones told reporters that Stelling showed a "lack of respect" and accused him of being "hypocritical", having been in his office when Hartlepool had gone five games without a loss.

Upon Jones' departure, Hartlepool striker Billy Paynter criticised the manager's tactics. Despite Hartlepool winning their final game of the season against Doncaster Rovers, a late goal from Newport consigned Pools to relegation from the Football League for the first time after joining in 1921.

=== Post-Hartlepool ===
In April 2018, Jones applied for the role of head coach of the Singapore national team but was unsuccessful.

Jones began working as a consultant at Bury in July 2019. His first task with the club was helping them to appoint Paul Wilkinson as manager. Jones left Bury following the club's expulsion from the Football League in August 2019.

== Acquittal of child abuse ==
In June 1999, Jones was formally questioned by police over alleged sexual abuse at St George's School in Formby, Merseyside, a home for children with educational and behavioural problems, where he had been employed as a care worker from 1986 to 1990. After voluntarily attending the police station, he was arrested then questioned, before being released on bail without charge.

He was subsequently charged on 27 September with nine offences against young boys of indecent assault and child cruelty. He denied all the allegations and stated he was "confident that [his] innocence will be established in due course". He appeared before Merseyside Magistrates Court on 2 November 1999, where he formally pleaded not guilty to all charges and was granted bail.

The case reached Liverpool Crown Court in December 2000, by which time Jones had left Southampton. He stood trial on an eventual 21 charges, which was swiftly reduced to 14, after two other alleged victims pulled out of proceedings on the eve of the trial. After a further alleged victim declined to appear or refused to give evidence, the judge directed the jury during the fourth day of proceedings to return a formal not guilty verdict on four charges relating to the absent party. After the prosecution stated a retrial would not be "just" on the remaining charges, the judge recorded not guilty verdicts on the remaining ten charges. Jones was cleared of all allegations.

One of the key alleged victims was later found to have fabricated their claim of abuse in Jones' and other cases brought from Operation Care – the police investigation into child abuse – to win compensation. Jones himself later spoke bitterly of the handling of the case and believed it was the cause of his father's death, who had died shortly after the allegations became public.

== Career statistics ==
=== Playing statistics ===
Appearances and goals by club, season and competition
Club	Season	Division	League		FA Cup		Other		Total	
Club	Season	Division	Apps	Goals	Apps	Goals	Apps	Goals	Apps	Goals
Everton	1975–76	First Division	13	0	0	0	0	0	13	0
Everton	1976–77	First Division	28	1	4	1	7	0	39	2
Everton	1977–78	First Division	34	0	1	0	5	0	40	0
Everton	1978–79	First Division	11	0	0	0	0	0	11	0
Everton	Total		86	1	5	1	12	0	103	2
Coventry City	1979–80	First Division	7	0	0	0	0	0	7	0
Coventry City	1980–81	First Division	4	0	0	0	1	0	5	0
Coventry City	Total		11	0	0	0	1	0	12	0
Preston North End	1983–84	Third Division	37	1	1	0	8	0	46	1
Preston North End	1984–85	Third Division	13	0	1	0	2	0	16	0
Preston North End	Total		50	1	2	0	12	0	64	1
Career total			147	2	7	1	23	0	177	3

=== Managerial statistics ===
Managerial record by team and tenure
Team	From	To	Record				
Team	From	To	P	W	D	L	Win %
Stockport County	31 March 1995	23 June 1997	131	63	36	32	48.1
Southampton	23 June 1997	27 January 2000	113	37	22	54	32.7
Wolverhampton Wanderers	3 January 2001	1 November 2004	187	75	52	60	40.1
Cardiff City	25 May 2005	30 May 2011	315	132	84	99	41.9
Sheffield Wednesday	5 March 2012	1 December 2013	79	29	21	29	36.7
Hartlepool United	23 January 2017	24 April 2017	17	3	4	10	17.6
Total			842	339	219	284	40.3

== Honours ==
=== As a player ===
Everton

- Football League Cup runner-up: 1976–77

Seiko SA

- Hong Kong First Division League: 1980–81, 1982–83
- Hong Kong FA Cup: 1980–81

=== As a manager ===
Stockport County

- Football League Second Division second-place promotion: 1996–97

Wolverhampton Wanderers

- Football League First Division play-offs: 2003

Cardiff City

- FA Cup runner-up: 2007–08

Sheffield Wednesday

- Football League One second-place promotion: 2011–12

Individual

- LMA Manager of the Year: 1998
- Football League First Division Manager of the Month: September 2001, February 2002
- Football League Championship Manager of the Month: August 2006, January 2008, October 2008, October 2009, October 2010
- Football League One Manager of the Month: March 2012, April 2012
