= Dave Evans (footballer) =

English footballer (born 1958)

Personal information
- Full name: David Gordon Evans
- Date of birth: 20 May 1958 (age 68)
- Place of birth: West Bromwich, England
- Height: 5 ft 11 in (1.80 m)
- Position: Defender

Youth career
- –1978: Aston Villa

Senior career*
Years	Team	Apps	(Gls)
1978–1979	Aston Villa	2	(0)
1979–1984	Halifax Town	218	(9)
1984–1990	Bradford City	223	(3)
1990–1992	Halifax Town	73	(1)
1992–????	Brighouse Town		
Total		516	(13)
- * Club domestic league appearances and goals

David Gordon Evans (born 20 May 1958) is an English retired professional footballer who made more than 500 league appearances for three clubs.

== Career ==
Born in West Bromwich, Evans began his professional career with Aston Villa. The 19-year-old made his Villa debut against Barcelona on 1 March 1978, in a 2-2 draw in the Quarter-finals of the UEFA Cup. He made two first team appearances in the 78–79 season.

Evans later played for Halifax Town in two spells, and also played with Bradford City. Whilst at Bradford he won the Football League Division Three title in 1984–85; on the last day of that season he was involved in the Valley Parade fire disaster.

== Honours ==
Bradford City

- Football League Third Division: 1984–85
