= Gordon Cowans =

English footballer and coach

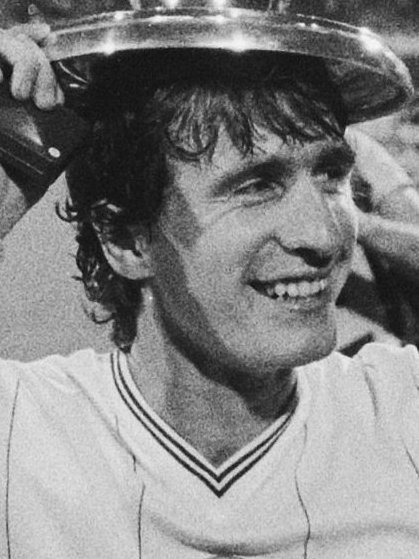
- Cowans in 1982

Personal information
- Full name: Gordon Sidney Cowans
- Date of birth: 27 October 1958 (age 67)
- Place of birth: West Cornforth, County Durham, England
- Height: 5 ft 8 in (1.73 m)
- Position: Midfielder

Youth career
- 1974–1976: Aston Villa

Senior career*
Years	Team	Apps	(Gls)
1976–1985	Aston Villa	286	(42)
1985–1988	A.S. Bari	94	(3)
1988–1991	Aston Villa	117	(7)
1991–1993	Blackburn Rovers	50	(2)
1993–1994	Aston Villa	11	(0)
1994	Derby County	36	(1)
1994–1995	Wolverhampton Wanderers	37	(0)
1995–1996	Sheffield United	21	(0)
1996–1997	Bradford City	25	(0)
1997	Stockport County	7	(0)
1997	Burnley	6	(0)
Total		690	(54)

International career
1977	England Youth	3	(0)
1979–1980	England U21	5	(0)
1980–1990	England B	2	(0)
1983–1990	England	10	(2)

Managerial career
- 1997–1998: Burnley (Reserves Team Coach)
- 1998–2016: Aston Villa (First Team & Academy Coach)
- 2014: Aston Villa (assistant manager)
- * Club domestic league appearances and goals

Gordon Sidney Cowans (born 27 October 1958) is an English retired football player and coach.

Cowans started his career at Aston Villa as an apprentice in 1974, and signed as a professional in 1976. During his time at Aston Villa, he won the League Cup, the League Championship, the European Cup and the European Super Cup.

Cowans left Aston Villa for the first time in 1985, signing for Bari. He then returned to Aston Villa in 1988 and left again in 1991 moving to Blackburn Rovers. When he left Blackburn he went back to Aston Villa, before moving to Derby County, Wolverhampton Wanderers, Sheffield United, Bradford City, Stockport County and finally Burnley.

He was also capped 10 times by England at international level scoring two goals, against Scotland and Egypt. According to former Aston Villa team-mate Derek Mountfield, Cowans was the best two-footed player he ever played with, capable of tough tackling and making spectacular assists. Cowans is consistently rated by Villa fans as one of their 3 best ever players. Cowans returned once again to Aston Villa in a coaching role, first coaching in their youth academy before becoming first team coach and later reserve team manager.

== Playing career ==
=== Aston Villa first spell ===
Although born in County Durham, Cowans came to Villa as an apprentice in 1973 at 15, and was part of the talented youth team that won the FA Youth Cup, an early indication of his talent. He soon made his first team debut, on 7 February 1976 as a substitute aged 17 whilst still an apprentice. At this time, he became a member of the England youth team. Progress continued and he was soon a regular in the Villa first team during the season Villa won the League Cup against Everton. In the 1980–81 season, Cowans won the league with Villa, and during the following season, the European Cup, on 26 May 1982. On 18 August 1983 Cowans suffered a double fracture of the right leg during a pre-season friendly in Zaragoza Spain against Mexican side FC America and missed the whole 1983–84 season; upon regaining full fitness he was sold to Bari in 1985 for a fee of £250,000.

In his first spell at Villa he played 286 games scoring 42 goals. He also won the PFA young player of the year award, a league championship, a European Cup and a European Super Cup.

=== A.S. Bari ===
Over the course of three seasons in Italy, Cowans made 94 appearances for Bari, scoring three goals.

=== Aston Villa second spell ===
During Cowans' transfer to Bari, Villa had retained the option of first refusal to buy him back should Bari decide to sell him; in 1988, Graham Taylor took up this option – much to the pleasure of Villa supporters – and Villa went on to finish as runners-up in the league during the 1989/90 season, before Taylor left the club to manage England.

During his second spell at Aston Villa, Cowans made 117 appearances, scoring seven times.

=== Blackburn Rovers ===
Ron Atkinson sold Cowans on 28 November 1991 for £200,000 to Blackburn Rovers. He helped them gain promotion to the new FA Premier League as Second Division play-off winners at Wembley. In his time at Ewood Park he played 50 times, scoring twice.

=== Aston Villa third spell ===
He then signed on a free transfer back to Aston Villa on 5 July 1993. By the time he had left Villa for the last time he had played a total of 453 games scoring 49 goals.

=== Derby County ===
Cowans was transferred to Derby County on 3 February 1994 for £200,000. He played a total of 36 times scoring one goal.

=== Wolves ===
Cowans was transferred to Wolves on 19 December 1994 for £20,000, signing again for Graham Taylor. He made his debut on 26 December 1994 in a 4–1 defeat at Oldham Athletic aged 36. He went on to make 37 appearances for Wolves six of which were as a substitute.

=== Sheffield United ===
Cowans was one of the first signings that new Sheffield United boss Howard Kendall made after replacing Dave Bassett in late 1995. Cowans was a key part of the side as it rose clear from the relegation zone, and of the passing style that Kendall introduced to the club. He played in the FA Cup 3rd round replay win over Arsenal that set up a 4th round tie with his former team Aston Villa. Cowans played 21 times for Sheffield United, and was surprisingly not given an extended deal by Kendall, instead leaving the club in summer 1996.

=== Bradford City ===
Cowans was signed by Chris Kamara in 1996 for Bradford City following their promotion to Division One. He made a total of 25 league appearances (one as substitute) and two League Cup games, without scoring, before being given a free transfer to Stockport County in March 1997.

=== Stockport County ===
In his short time with Stockport Cowans made seven appearances, scoring no goals.

=== Burnley ===
Cowans played six times for Burnley, scoring no goals.

== Coaching career ==
Cowans started his coaching career at Burnley before moving back to Villa Park for a fourth time to become youth team coach, then going on to become first team coach during Gérard Houllier's reign. With the departure of Houllier, the Villa hierarchy let it be known that both Cowans and Kevin MacDonald would have futures at the club no matter who the new manager was. In April 2014 Aston Villa suspended Ian Culverhouse, their assistant manager and Gary Karsa, the head of football operations pending an internal investigation. Cowans and veteran goalkeeper Shay Given were temporarily promoted in their place.

== Honours ==
Aston Villa

- Football League First Division: 1980–81
- Football League Cup: 1976–77
- FA Charity Shield: 1981 (shared)
- European Cup: 1981–82
- European Super Cup: 1982
- Intercontinental Cup runner-up: 1982

Blackburn Rovers

- Football League Second Division play-offs: 1992

Individual

- PFA Team of the Year: 1991–92 Second Division
