= John Burridge =

English footballer (born 1951)

Personal information
- Date of birth: 3 December 1951 (age 74)
- Place of birth: Workington, England
- Height: 5 ft 11 in (1.80 m)
- Position: Goalkeeper

Senior career*
Years	Team	Apps	(Gls)
1969–1971	Workington	27	(0)
1971	→ Blackpool (loan)	3	(0)
1971–1975	Blackpool	134	(0)
1975–1978	Aston Villa	65	(0)
1978	→ Southend United (loan)	6	(0)
1978–1980	Crystal Palace	88	(0)
1980–1982	Queens Park Rangers	39	(0)
1982–1984	Wolverhampton Wanderers	74	(0)
1984	→ Derby County (loan)	6	(0)
1984–1987	Sheffield United	109	(0)
1987–1989	Southampton	62	(0)
1989–1991	Newcastle United	67	(0)
1991–1993	Hibernian	65	(0)
1993	Newcastle United	0	(0)
1993	Scarborough	3	(0)
1993–1994	Lincoln City	4	(0)
1994	Enfield	0	(0)
1994	Aberdeen	3	(0)
1994	Newcastle United	0	(0)
1994	Dunfermline Athletic	0	(0)
1994	Falkirk	3	(0)
1994	Barrow	1	(0)
1994	Dumbarton	3	(0)
1994–1995	Manchester City	4	(0)
1995	Notts County	0	(0)
1995	Witton Albion	3	(0)
1995	Darlington	3	(0)
1995–1996	Grimsby Town	0	(0)
1996	Gateshead	0	(0)
1996	Northampton Town	0	(0)
1996	Queen of the South	6	(0)
1996	Purfleet	1	(0)
1996	Blyth Spartans	0	(0)
1996	Scarborough	0	(0)
1996–1998	Blyth Spartans	24	(0)
Total		803	(0)

Managerial career
- 1997–1998: Blyth Spartans
- 2016: Global
- * Club domestic league appearances and goals

John Burridge (born 3 December 1951), nicknamed Budgie, is an English former professional footballer who played as a goalkeeper. In his senior career, he played for 29 clubs, 18 of them in the Football League, in a career that lasted nearly 30 years. Overall, Burridge played 803 league matches in the English and Scottish leagues, including non-league level, and, including matches in cups, in at least at 962 matches in total. (Note: John Burridge's appearances for Scottish clubs, apart from the matches of Hibernian, Aberdeen, where he played in only one cup match, for the Scottish FA Cup, and Falkirk, where he played only in the league, are only league appearances.)

== Playing career ==
Born in Workington, Burridge grew up in the Cumbrian mining village of Great Clifton. He began his professional career at his local club, Workington, signing-up at the age of 15. He played his first league game in 1969.

In 1971, he was transferred to Blackpool, initially on loan at the end of the 1970–71 season, then permanently for the start of 1971–72. It was with the Seasiders that he won his first honour: the Anglo-Italian Cup. Blackpool beat Bologna 2–1, after extra time, at the latter's Stadio Comunale on 12 June 1971. Burridge's performance earned him the praise of the normally highly-critical Italian fans.

In 1975, Burridge joined Aston Villa for £75,000. He was signed by Ron Saunders and spent two seasons at Villa Park, winning the League Cup with them, but eventually lost his place to Jimmy Rimmer. He had a short but successful loan spell at Southend United before joining Crystal Palace in 1978, signed by Terry Venables. In a 4–1 victory over Ipswich Town, after Palace went 4–0 up, Burridge, to entertain the fans, sat on the crossbar. After two and a half seasons at Palace, he joined London rivals Queens Park Rangers, again signed by Venables. He was dropped in favour of Peter Hucker for the 1982 FA Cup Final.

External videos
- John Burridge back flip and circus warm up.

In July 1982, Burridge joined his seventh club, Wolverhampton Wanderers. In the 1982–83 season in a game at Molineux, Wolves entertained Newcastle United. Prior to the game Burridge had made a bet with a stake of £100, with Kevin Keegan that Burridge would play the game in a Superman outfit. As a result of the bet, Wolves biggest crowd of the season, a crowd of 22500, witnessed Burridge playing the match in a Superman outfit. Burridge helped Wolves gain promotion to the top flight as runners-up, only to be relegated the following season. He left Wolves in October 1984 to join Sheffield United, signed by Ian Porterfield. He also had a loan spell at Derby County, signed by Arthur Cox, shortly before joining the Blades.

Burridge spent three seasons at Sheffield United before joining Southampton in 1987, signed by Chris Nicholl. Two years later, he moved to Newcastle United. After two years at Newcastle United, he moved to Scotland to join Hibernian, where he won a Scottish League Cup winners' medal. After two years in Edinburgh, Burridge returned to Newcastle for a second spell at the club in 1993, signed by Kevin Keegan.

Despite being past 40, Burridge refused to hang up his gloves, and continued moving across the country for short spells at any club that requested his services. Between 1993 and 1997, Burridge played for no fewer than fourteen clubs. They were, in chronological order: Scarborough, Lincoln, Aberdeen, Dumbarton, Falkirk, Manchester City, (where he became, at 43 years, four months and 26 days, the oldest player to appear in the Premier League) Notts County, Witton Albion, Darlington, Grimsby, Gateshead, Northampton Town, Queen of the South, Blyth Spartans, Scarborough once more. These spells usually lasted no more than one or two games as an emergency goalkeeper. He finished his playing career with a brief spell as player-manager at Blyth Spartans in 1997, following a similarly brief spell back at Newcastle United as goalkeeping coach.

== Blackpool F.C. Hall of Fame ==
Burridge was inducted into the Hall of Fame at Bloomfield Road, when it was officially opened by former Blackpool player Jimmy Armfield in April 2006. Organised by the Blackpool Supporters Association, Blackpool fans around the world voted on their all-time heroes. Five players from each decade are inducted; Burridge is in the 1970s.

== Managerial and coaching career ==
In his second spell with Blyth Spartans, Burridge was the club's player-manager. On 15 November 1997, he took Spartans to his first club, Blackpool, in the first round of the FA Cup. The hosts won 4–3.

Burridge 'discovered' Oman national team goalkeeper Ali Al-Habsi aged 16 in his first spell on the coaching staff of the Oman national team and was instrumental in the player's transfer to Bolton Wanderers in January 2006. He has also coached English national goalkeepers Tim Flowers, Nigel Martyn and Paul Robinson.

Burridge worked as a goalkeeping coach for Al Ain in the United Arab Emirates. He was a regular guest for the launch of English Premier League show on the regional sports channel ART Prime Sports and a regular pundit on Starhub, Singapore's Football Channel. He is also a writer in the football column of Singapore newspaper, The New Paper. Burridge had a spell as a backup commentator along with Rob Lee for Ten Sports UEFA Champions League fixtures and resident pundit on The Football Channel in Singapore, before returning to work for the Oman national team as goalkeeper coach. He was dismissed by Oman in January 2011.

As of January 2012, Burridge is working as a television pundit for Ten Sports on their football show C2K on TEN Action along with Joe Morrison and Carlton Palmer. Together they cover UEFA Champions League and UEFA Europa League football from Dubai.

in September 2015, he was the goalkeeping coach for the LionsXII which plays in the Malaysian Super League.

In August 2016, it was reported that he had joined Global F.C. of the United Football League, although the appointment was short-lived as Burridge did not have the necessary coaching badge.

In July 2019, he was signed by the Indian Super League top division club Kerala Blasters as their goalkeeping consultant for goalkeeping academy.

== Attitude to conditioning and innovation ==
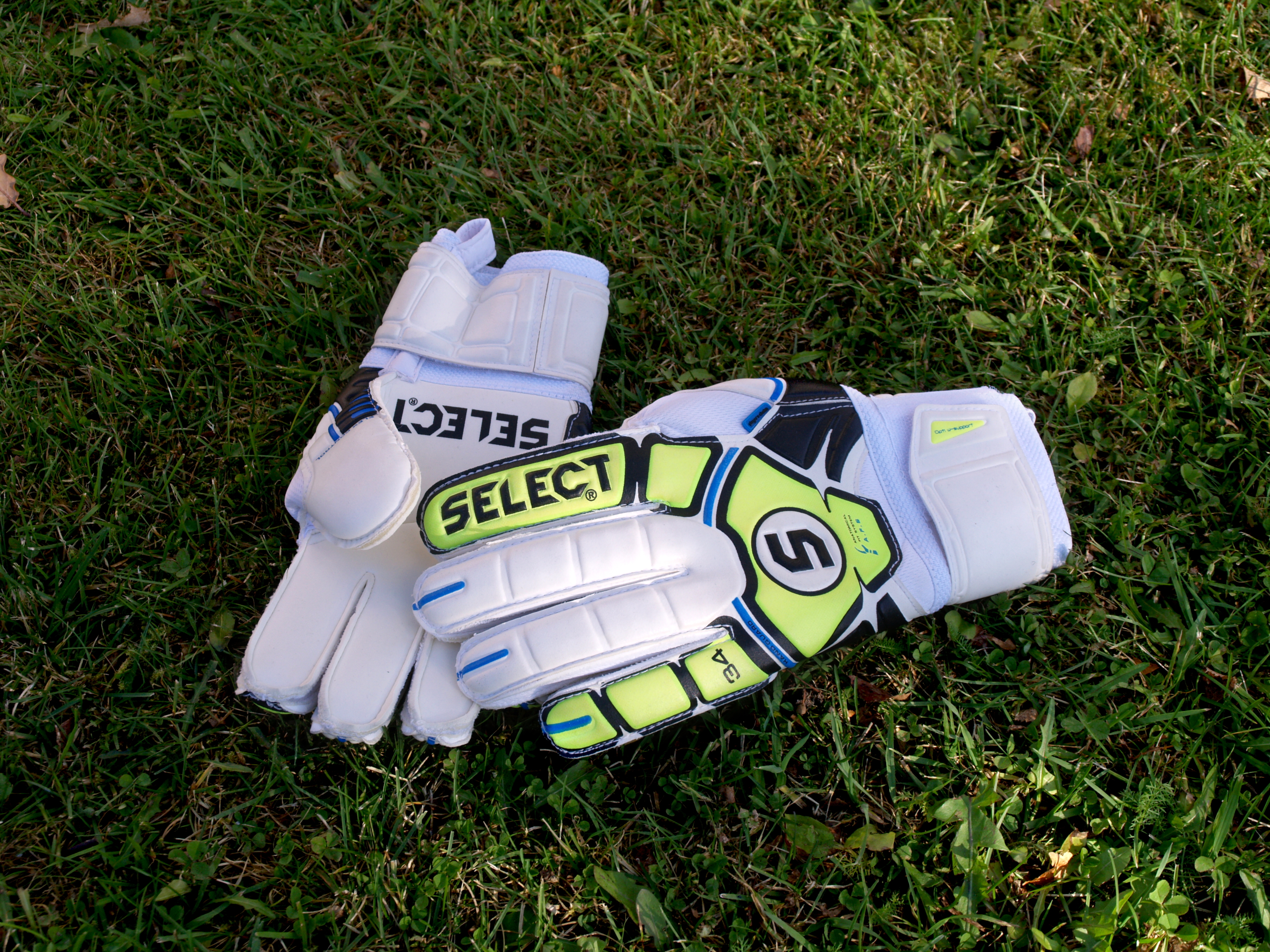
Burridge was one of the first goalkeepers in Britain to wear Latex gloves in football matches.

Unusually for a player in the 1970s, 1980s and 1990s, Burridge was a teetotaller. He also went against the grain with his diet. In the 1970s Burridge noted players would eat steaks, or even fish and chips for prematch meals, whereas Burridge, studying sport science, and the diets of African tribesmen, sensing something was not right with the way footballers generally fuelled and refuelled, and finding fault with the timing of their fuelling, would carb up with quick meals like baby food, pasta and potatoes. He would drink glasses of water instead of a cup of tea. Perplexing the people of the time period, Burridge would also make fruit smoothies before many had considered the concept of blending fruits for nutrition.

In the 1980s, on winning runs, warming up he would do somersaults to entertain the fans, which Burridge noted was frowned upon by the echelons in the game though Burridge did not care for their sentiments, or their belief as to what was the correct way to warm up.

In the 1970s Burridge would also be among the first goalkeepers to use Latex gloves; he would also introduce Peter Shilton and Pat Jennings to latex gloves.

== Personal life ==
Burridge is married to Janet, whom he met while with Blackpool. His son, Tom, played ice hockey for Blackburn Hawks. John Burridge's autobiography, entitled "Budgie" was released on 4 April 2011.

== Honours ==
Blackpool

- Anglo-Italian Cup: 1971

Aston Villa

- Football League Cup: 1976–77

Crystal Palace

- Football League Second Division: 1978–79

Wolverhampton Wanderers

- Football League Second Division runner-up: 1982–83

Hibernian

- Scottish League Cup: 1990–91

Individual

- Newcastle United Player of the Year: 1990–91

== Sources ==
- Burridge, John (4 April 2011). Budgie: The Autobiography of Goalkeeping Legend John Burridge. United kingdom: John Blake Publishing Ltd. ISBN 978-1843584643.
