= Joe Morrison (TV presenter) =

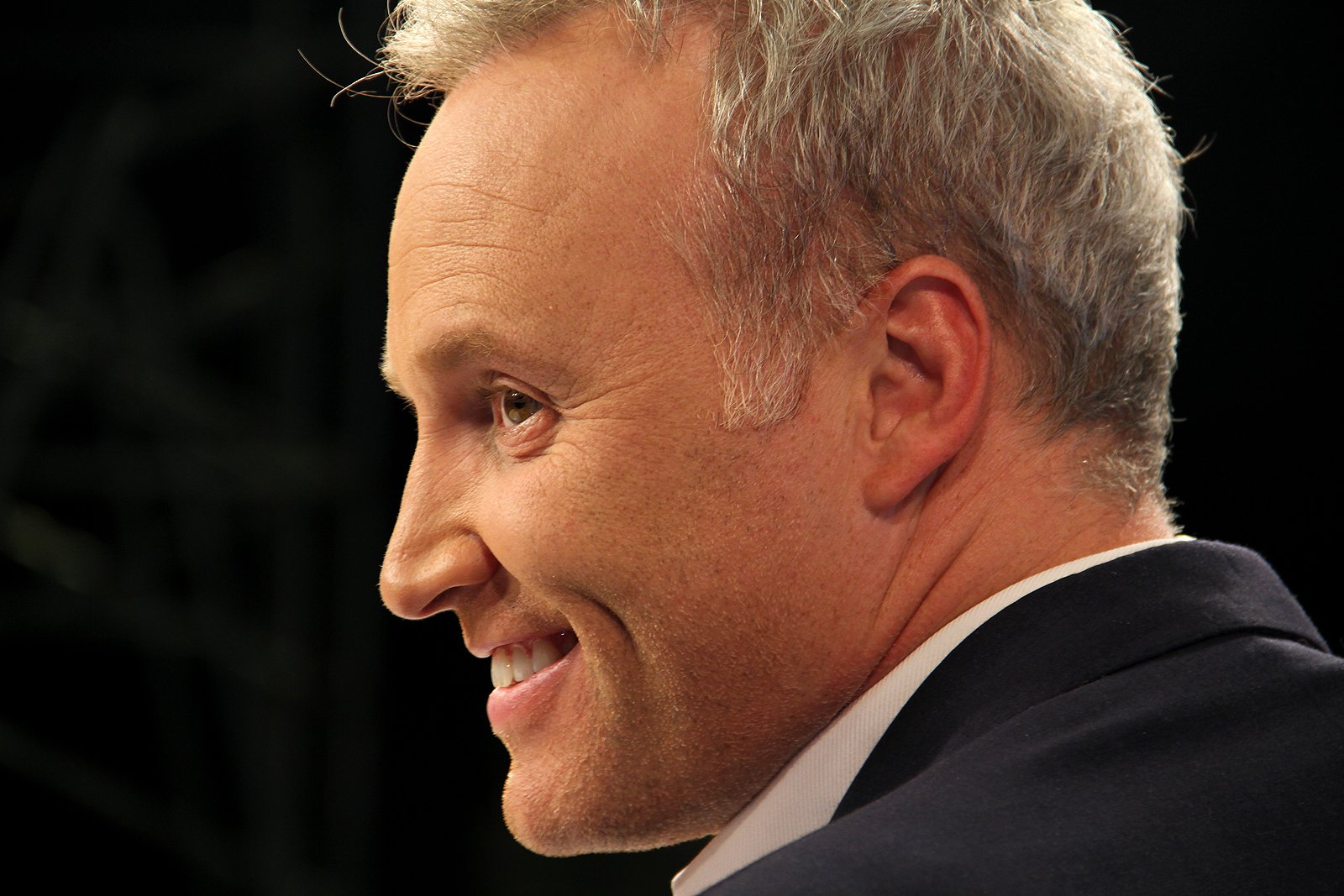
- Morrison in 2013
- Born: Joseph Morrison
- Education: Fettes College
- Alma mater: University of Aberdeen
- Occupations: Football presenter TV anchor
- Employer(s): TEN Sports, StarHub (former); ADM, Sony SIX, Facebook Watch

Joseph Morrison is a football presenter known for his work on TEN Sports, TEN Action+, SONY SIX and SSC which provides live football coverage to the MENA, Indian subcontinent, and other Asian regions.

He is best known as the former host of C2K (Countdown 2 Kickoff), with pundits John Burridge and Carlton Palmer as well as guest appearances by Trevor Sinclair and Sunil Chhetri. The show covered the UEFA Champions League, UEFA Europa League, League Cup, and I-League on TEN Action+.

== Early life ==
Morrison was educated at Windsor Boys' School and Fettes College in Scotland, and graduated from Aberdeen University in 1993 with a degree in Agricultural Business Management.

== Career ==
=== BBC ===
Morrison joined BBC Newcastle in 1996 as a sports reporter and commentator. He took part in a charity stunt for BBC Children In Need that involved sitting in all 52,000 seats at St. James' Park stadium.

Senior producers invited him into regional BBCTV in the sports field where his successes included football, rugby, European tour golf motor racing and horse racing.

=== Newcastle United ===
In 2001, Joe Morrison joined Newcastle United F.C. during one of their most successful periods. Morrison was tasked with reporting on Newcastle's UEFA Champions League adventures as well as their domestic travails under manager Bobby Robson.

=== ART Arab radio and television ===
In 2005 Morrison was selected to front ART's newly launched English language Premier League channel Prime Sport. It was the first time the Premier League had been broadcast in English across the Middle East.

During this time he hosted the Asian Football Confederation (AFC) Annual Awards held at the Emirates Palace in Abu Dhabi alongside FIFA President Sepp Blatter, which was broadcast across the Middle East and Asia.

He worked with and was responsible for bringing to the Middle East, many people from the world of football including Alex Ferguson, Bobby Robson, Paul Gascoigne, Ian Rush, Bobby Charlton and Teddy Sheringham.

=== The Football Channel - Singapore ===
After ART lost the Premier League rights, Morrison moved to anchor the Premier League coverage for the new Football Channel launched by Starhub in Singapore. The live weekend broadcasts included a live show from Clarke Quay with Nigel Spackman and Peter Reid in which thousands of fans of Manchester United and Liverpool descended on the city centre for the special live screening.

=== Ten Sports/Ten Action ===
In his tenure with Ten Network Morrison anchored football shows and hosted live broadcasts from Delhi and Kolkata for the UEFA Champions League. Following a UEFA broadcast in September 2007, Morrison discovered that his father had died. As host of C2K-branded shows Morrison and his two resident guests Palmer and Burridge gained a cult following. In 2014, Morrison resigned as host of TEN Sports and TEN Action+ live football coverage along with resident guests Trevor Sinclair and Burridge.

=== Sony Six ===
Morrison was drafted in to anchor the FIFA World Cup 2014 coverage of host broadcaster SONY SIX from Mumbai accompanied. He hosted the Euro 2016 for SONY SIX. Morrison anchored the FIFA World Cup 2018 for Sony Pictures Networks on Sony Ten 2 HD, Sony Ten 3 HD, Sony Six HD, Sony ESPN HD, and Sony LIV.

=== Facebook Watch ===
He is the host of Facebook Watch's coverage of La Liga in the Indian subcontinent. He usually questions experts about the game and reads comments left by viewers.
