= John Deehan =

English football coach & manager (born 1957)

Personal information
- Full name: John Matthew Deehan
- Date of birth: 6 August 1957 (age 69)
- Place of birth: Solihull, England
- Height: 6 ft 0 in (1.83 m)
- Position: Striker

Senior career*
Years	Team	Apps	(Gls)
1975–1979	Aston Villa	110	(40)
1979–1981	West Bromwich Albion	47	(5)
1981–1986	Norwich City	162	(62)
1986–1988	Ipswich Town	49	(11)
1988–1990	Manchester City	0	(0)
1990	Barnsley	11	(2)
Total		379	(120)

International career
1976	England Youth	2	(1)
1977–1979	England U21	7	(6)

Managerial career
- 1994–1995: Norwich City
- 1995–1998: Wigan Athletic
- 2002: Aston Villa (caretaker)
- * Club domestic league appearances and goals

John Matthew Deehan (born 6 August 1957) is an English former football manager and player.

During his playing career he was a footballer from 1975 until 1990 and is most well known for his spells as a striker for Aston Villa and Norwich City. He also played for West Bromwich Albion, Ipswich Town, Manchester City and Barnsley. He was also capped seven times at England U21 level, scoring six goals.

Since retiring Deehan initially returned to Norwich as a coach and had a spell as manager during their 1994–95 Premier League campaign before later managing Wigan Athletic to a Division Three title and a caretaker spell in charge of Aston Villa. He has since held roles as the director of football of Northampton Town, Lincoln City, Grimsby Town and Plymouth Argyle, as well as actively being part of the coaching staff at Kettering Town and Sheffield Wednesday.

== Career ==
=== As a player ===
Born in Solihull, as a player Deehan was a striker who is best known for productive spells with Aston Villa and Norwich City. With Villa he was a member of the team that won the 1977 Football League Cup Final against Everton and was a member of the Norwich sides which won the 1985 Football League Cup Final and the Second Division championship in 1986. On 24 January 2012 he was appointed as Director of Football at League Two club Plymouth Argyle. Argyle stood at 22nd in League Two at the time of his appointment.

He was a competent goalscorer from an early age, breaking the 10-goal barrier in the league for three successive seasons by the age of 22. He was initially less successful after leaving Villa Park in September 1979 to sign for Villa's local rivals West Bromwich Albion, managing just five goals from 47 league games over the next two years, but recaptured his form after joining Norwich City in December 1981 and helping them seal promotion to the First Division that season. He scored 20 league goals in his first full season at Carrow Road and managed 15 and 13 goals over the next two seasons, although he was unable to save the Canaries from relegation in 1984–85. He also helped them win the Football League Cup in 1985 and the Second Division title - and a return to the First Division as Second Division champions a year later.

In 2002, Norwich fans voted Deehan into the Norwich City F.C. Hall of Fame in recognition of his contribution as a player.

In the summer of 1986, he left Norwich to join Ipswich Town in a player exchange deal that saw Trevor Putney move to Carrow Road. His final season at Norwich had seen him collected a Second Division title medal, but his form was less impressive than in previous seasons with just four goals from 26 league games.

From 1988 until 1990 he was player-coach at Manchester City, where he worked under the management of former Norwich assistant Mel Machin, before returning to Norwich City as Mike Walker's assistant in the summer of 1992.

=== Management and Coaching ===
He helped coach Norwich to a third-place finish in the inaugural FA Premier League (season 1992–93), and was promoted to the role of manager the following January when Walker moved to Everton. Norwich finished 12th in the Premiership in 1993–94 and started the following season reasonably well despite the (then) record English sale of Chris Sutton to Blackburn Rovers for £5 million. Despite the loss of Sutton, and the subsequent sale of Efan Ekoku, Norwich were seventh in the Premiership by Christmas and were in contention for a UEFA Cup place. An injury to goalkeeper Bryan Gunn then sparked a dramatic loss of form, and by the time the Canaries lost 3–0 to Newcastle United on 8 April 1995, they were heading for the relegation zone. Deehan then stepped down as manager with his assistant Gary Megson taking charge, but Megson was unable to stave off relegation.

Deehan's absence from football did not last long. He began the 1995–96 season as manager of Wigan Athletic in the Football League Third Division, and after two seasons at the helm he guided them to the Division Three title and promotion to Division Two. After safeguarding Wigan's survival in 1997–98, he accepted the assistant manager's job at Sheffield United and for one season worked under Steve Bruce. However, Bruce's time at Bramall Lane was unsuccessful and Deehan resigned alongside him.

After leaving Sheffield United, Deehan worked again with Steve Bruce at Huddersfield Town, joining the club in the summer of 1999. Following Bruce's sacking in October 2000, Deehan remained at the McAlpine to work alongside Lou Macari, who initially took over as caretaker manager and later became permanent manager. Deehan left in the summer of 2001 to join Aston Villa as assistant manager to John Gregory in July 2001. In January 2002, Deehan was named joint caretaker manager of Villa (with Stuart Gray) when Gregory resigned. He left the club when Graham Taylor was named Villa manager for the second time.

In October 2003, Deehan became Director of Football at Northampton Town, with Colin Calderwood working under him as team manager. The duo were appointed to get the team promoted from the league's basement division, and achieved this aim in the 2005–06 season. Both Calderwood and Deehan left the club at the end of the 2005–06 season, with Deehan moving to Lincoln City as Director of Football. On 15 October 2007, it was confirmed that Deehan and Lincoln City manager John Schofield had left the club. In November 2007, Deehan was employed as a scout by Premier League side Bolton Wanderers who were looking for a number of former professionals to head their recruitment drive led by former Everton manager Colin Harvey.

In September 2008, Deehan expressed interest in the vacant manager's post at League Two side Grimsby Town, saying: "I think Grimsby Town is a good club and a good opportunity for any manager. Whenever I've been to Blundell Park, I've been impressed with the set-up and the positive approach to football." Despite his interest Deehan failed to land the Grimsby job, which was given to Mike Newell.

On 21 January 2009, he was appointed as Chief Scout of Norwich City Football Club in part of the new management team alongside three of his former players – Bryan Gunn as First Team Manager, Ian Crook as first team coach and Ian Butterworth as Assistant Manager.

In December 2009, Deehan became Lee Harper's assistant at Kettering Town but was controversially sacked later that month immediately following a 5–1 defeat to Leeds United in an FA Cup second-round replay where his choice of substitutions during extra time were blamed by Kettering owner Imraan Ladak for the defeat.

On 17 March 2010, he was announced as Head of Recruitment (Director of Football) at Grimsby Town in order to work with manager Neil Woods and his assistant Chris Casper. It was touted that Deeham would be a possible replacement for Woods if the club are relegated from the Football League. However, after the conclusion of the 2009–10 season, which eventually brought relegation, Deehan's contract was not renewed and he left the club on 20 May 2010.

On 25 January 2012, Deehan was appointed Director of Football at Plymouth Argyle. At the end of the 2012–2013 season he left the club. He teamed up with Stuart Gray again early in 2014, joining the coaching staff at Sheffield Wednesday. He left the club in June 2015 after Gray's dismissal.

In 2016, Deehan joined Solihull Moors' academy coaching staff.

== Personal life ==
In March 2022, Deehan's family said that he had been battling with dementia for the last six years.

== Honours ==
=== As a player ===
Aston Villa

- Football League Cup: 1976–77

Norwich City

- Football League Cup: 1984–85

=== As a manager ===
Wigan Athletic

- Football League Third Division: 1996–97
