= Neil Robinson (footballer, born 1979) =

English footballer

Personal information
- Full name: Neil David Robinson
- Date of birth: 18 November 1979 (age 46)
- Place of birth: Liverpool, England
- Position: Striker

Senior career*
Years	Team	Apps	(Gls)
2001–2002	Prescot Cables	?	(43)
2002–2004	Macclesfield Town	11	(0)
2003–2004	Leigh RMI	9	(1)
2004–2006	Southport	85	(29)
2006–2007	Burscough	24	(12)
2007–2009	Southport	39	(10)
2009	Skelmersdale United	0	(0)
- * Club domestic league appearances and goals as of 25 August 2008

Neil David Robinson (born 18 November 1979) is an English former professional footballer. He is the son of former professional footballer Neil Robinson.

== Career ==
=== Prescot Cables ===
Starting his career at Prescot Cables, Neil quickly impressed, scoring 43 goals for the Northern Premier League side in just one season, leading to interest from league clubs.

=== Macclesfield Town ===
Robinson was signed up by David Moss for Macclesfield Town, for a fee of £12,000, but his stay at Moss Rose was to be hampered by injury, and he was loaned out to Leigh RMI and Southport, and he impressed in the latter.

=== Southport F.C. ===
Liam Watson was quick to secure a permanent deal for Robinson, and he played a major part in getting the club in an entry position for the newly created Conference North, scoring 15 goals in just 15 games in his first season with Southport in the Unibond Premier Division.

Next season Robinson was to play a smaller role, with Steve Daly and Terry Fearns ahead of him in the pecking order, but he still played a part, and was a member of the 2004/2005 Conference North winning Southport team.

After helping keep Southport in the Conference National in the 2005/2006 season, much of the relegation survival squad left unable to make the transition to full-time, including Robinson.

=== Burscough FC ===
Neil followed ex-Southport manager, Liam Watson to Burscough, in the Unibond Premier, in a deal involving Kevin Leadbetter and Neil Fitzhenry, with Tony Gray heading the opposite way to Haig Avenue.

Here, Robinson was a pivotal player in Burscough's treble winning season, which saw them promoted to the Conference North.

=== Back to Southport ===
In October 2007, Robinson rejoined Southport, for an undisclosed fee, after Peter Davenport has reportedly been impressed with him. He signed a full-time contract with the Sandgrounders. After his first season back with the 'port, and 6 league goals for the club, it appeared Robinson would be moving on, after the club accepted a bid from fellow Conference North club Droyslden. However, he rejected a contract at "the bloods", to stay at Southport and fight for his place.

=== Skelmersdale United F.C. ===
In February 2009, Robinson was released from Southport and duly signed for Skelmersdale United.
