= 1976–77 Football League Cup =

Tournament details
- Country: England; Wales
- Teams: 92

Final positions
- Champions: Aston Villa (3rd title)
- Runners-up: Everton

Tournament statistics
- Top goal scorer: Brian Little (10 goals)

The 1976–77 Football League Cup was the 17th season of the Football League Cup, a football knockout competition for England's top four tier clubs. The competition started on 14 August 1976 and ended with the final going to a second replay on 13 April 1977.

The final was contested by First Division teams Aston Villa and Everton at Wembley Stadium in London, followed by replays at Hillsborough and finally being decided at Old Trafford.

== First round ==
Number of teams per tier entering this round
First Division	Second Division	Third Division	Fourth Division	Total
22 / 22	22 / 22	24 / 24	24 / 24	92 / 92

=== First leg ===
Home team	Score	Away team	Date
Aldershot (4)	1–1	Gillingham (3)	14 August 1976
Bournemouth (4)	0–0	Torquay United (4)	14 August 1976
Bradford City (4)	1–1	Oldham Athletic (2)	14 August 1976
Bury (3)	2–1	Preston North End (3)	14 August 1976
Cardiff City (2)	2–1	Bristol Rovers (2)	14 August 1976
Chester (3)	2–0	Hereford United (2)	14 August 1976
Chesterfield (3)	3–1	Rotherham United (3)	14 August 1976
Crewe Alexandra (4)	2–1	Tranmere Rovers (3)	14 August 1976
Crystal Palace (3)	2–2	Portsmouth (3)	14 August 1976
Doncaster Rovers (4)	1–1	Lincoln City (3)	14 August 1976
Grimsby Town (3)	0–3	Sheffield Wednesday (3)	14 August 1976
Halifax Town (4)	0–0	Darlington (4)	14 August 1976
Huddersfield Town (4)	2–0	Hartlepool (4)	14 August 1976
Mansfield Town (3)	2–0	Scunthorpe United (4)	14 August 1976
Millwall (2)	2–1	Colchester United (4)	14 August 1976
Oxford United (3)	1–0	Cambridge United (4)	14 August 1976
Plymouth Argyle (2)	0–1	Exeter City (4)	14 August 1976
Port Vale (3)	1–1	Wrexham (3)	14 August 1976
Reading (3)	2–3	Peterborough United (3)	14 August 1976
Rochdale (4)	0–1	Blackburn Rovers (2)	14 August 1976
Shrewsbury Town (3)	0–1	Walsall (3)	16 August 1976
Southend United (4)	1–1	Brighton & Hove Albion (3)	14 August 1976
Southport (4)	1–2	Carlisle United (2)	14 August 1976
Swansea City (4)	4–1	Newport County (4)	14 August 1976
Swindon Town (3)	3–2	Northampton Town (3)	14 August 1976
Watford (4)	1–1	Brentford (4)	14 August 1976
Workington (4)	0–0	Stockport County (4)	14 August 1976
York City (3)	0–0	Barnsley (4)	14 August 1976

=== Second leg ===
Home team	Score	Away team	Date	Agg
Barnsley (4)	0–0	York City (3)	17 August 1976	0–0
Blackburn Rovers (2)	4–1	Rochdale (4)	18 August 1976	5–1
Brentford (4)	0–2	Watford (4)	17 August 1976	1–3
Brighton & Hove Albion (3)	2–1	Southend United (4)	17 August 1976	3–2
Bristol Rovers (2)	4–4	Cardiff City (2)	17 August 1976	5–6
Cambridge United (4)	2–0	Oxford United (3)	17 August 1976	2–1
Carlisle United (2)	0–1	Southport (4)	17 August 1976	2–2
Colchester United (4)	2–1	Millwall (2)	17 August 1976	3–3
Darlington (4)	1–1	Halifax Town (4)	18 August 1976	1–1
Exeter City (4)	1–0	Plymouth Argyle (2)	18 August 1976	2–0
Gillingham (3)	2–0	Aldershot (4)	18 August 1976	3–1
Hartlepool (4)	1–2	Huddersfield Town (4)	18 August 1976	1–4
Hereford United (2)	4–3	Chester (3)	18 August 1976	4–5
Lincoln City (3)	1–1	Doncaster Rovers (4)	18 August 1976	2–2
Newport County (4)	1–0	Swansea City (4)	17 August 1976	2–4
Northampton Town (3)	2–0	Swindon Town (3)	18 August 1976	4–3
Oldham Athletic (2)	1–3	Bradford City (4)	17 August 1976	2–4
Peterborough United (3)	0–1	Reading (3)	18 August 1976	3–3
Portsmouth (3)	0–1	Crystal Palace (3)	17 August 1976	2–3
Preston North End (3)	1–1	Bury (3)	17 August 1976	2–3
Rotherham United (3)	3–0	Chesterfield (3)	17 August 1976	4–3
Scunthorpe United (4)	2–0	Mansfield Town (3)	17 August 1976	2–2
Sheffield Wednesday (3)	0–0	Grimsby Town (3)	18 August 1976	3–0
Stockport County (4)	0–0	Workington (4)	18 August 1976	0–0
Torquay United (4)	1–0	Bournemouth (4)	17 August 1976	1–0
Tranmere Rovers (3)	3–1	Crewe Alexandra (4)	18 August 1976	4–3
Walsall (3)	1–0	Shrewsbury Town (3)	18 August 1976	2–0
Wrexham (3)	1–0	Port Vale (3)	18 August 1976	2–1

=== Replays ===
Home team	Score	Away team	Date
Carlisle United (2)	3–2	Southport (4)	24 August 1976
Colchester United (4)	4–4	Millwall (2)	30 August 1976
Doncaster Rovers (4)	1–1	Lincoln City (3)	24 August 1976
Halifax Town (4)	1–2	Darlington (4)	30 August 1976
Peterborough United (3)	3–1	Reading (3)	25 August 1976
Scunthorpe United (4)	2–1	Mansfield Town (3)	24 August 1976
Workington (4)	0–2	Stockport County (4)	30 August 1976
York City (3)	1–2	Barnsley (4)	24 August 1976

== Second round ==
Number of teams per tier entering this round
First Division	Second Division	Third Division	Fourth Division	Total
22 / 22	18 / 22	12 / 24	12 / 24	64 / 92

=== Ties ===
Home team	Score	Away team	Date
Arsenal (1)	3–2	Carlisle United (2)	31 August 1976
Aston Villa (1)	3–0	Manchester City (1)	1 September 1976
Blackburn Rovers (2)	1–3	Stockport County (4)	1 September 1976
Blackpool (2)	2–1	Birmingham City (1)	31 August 1976
Bradford City (4)	1–2	Bolton Wanderers (2)	1 September 1976
Bristol City (1)	0–1	Coventry City (1)	31 August 1976
Bury (3)	2–1	Darlington (4)	1 September 1976
Cardiff City (2)	1–3	Queens Park Rangers (1)	1 September 1976
Chelsea (2)	3–1	Sheffield United (2)	1 September 1976
Chester (3)	2–3	Swansea City (4)	31 August 1976
Crystal Palace (3)	1–3	Watford (4)	31 August 1976
Doncaster Rovers (4)	1–2	Derby County (1)	31 August 1976
Everton (1)	3–0	Cambridge United (4)	30 August 1976
Exeter City (4)	1–3	Norwich City (1)	31 August 1976
Fulham (2)	1–1	Peterborough United (3)	31 August 1976
Gillingham (3)	1–2	Newcastle United (1)	1 September 1976
Ipswich Town (1)	0–0	Brighton & Hove Albion (3)	31 August 1976
Orient (2)	1–0	Hull City (2)	31 August 1976
Liverpool (1)	1–1	West Bromwich Albion (1)	31 August 1976
Manchester United (1)	5–0	Tranmere Rovers (3)	1 September 1976
Middlesbrough (1)	1–2	Tottenham Hotspur (1)	31 August 1976
Northampton Town (3)	0–1	Huddersfield Town (4)	31 August 1976
Rotherham United (3)	1–2	Millwall (2)	1 September 1976
Scunthorpe United (4)	0–2	Notts County (2)	31 August 1976
Southampton (2)	1–1	Charlton Athletic (2)	31 August 1976
Stoke City (1)	2–1	Leeds United (1)	1 September 1976
Sunderland (1)	3–1	Luton Town (2)	31 August 1976
Torquay United (4)	1–0	Burnley (2)	1 September 1976
Walsall (3)	2–4	Nottingham Forest (2)	31 August 1976
West Ham United (1)	3–0	Barnsley (4)	1 September 1976
Wolverhampton Wanderers (2)	1–2	Sheffield Wednesday (3)	31 August 1976
Wrexham (3)	1–0	Leicester City (1)	1 September 1976

=== Replays ===
Home team	Score	Away team	Date
Brighton & Hove Albion (3)	2–1	Ipswich Town (1)	7 September 1976
Charlton Athletic (2)	2–1	Southampton (2)	7 September 1976
Peterborough United (3)	1–2	Fulham (2)	7 September 1976
West Bromwich Albion (1)	1–0	Liverpool (1)	6 September 1976

== Third round ==
Number of teams per tier entering this round
First Division	Second Division	Third Division	Fourth Division	Total
14 / 22	9 / 22	4 / 24	5 / 24	32 / 92

=== Ties ===
Home team	Score	Away team	Date
Aston Villa (1)	2–1	Norwich City (1)	21 September 1976
Blackpool (2)	1–1	Arsenal (1)	21 September 1976
Charlton Athletic (2)	0–1	West Ham United (1)	21 September 1976
Chelsea (2)	2–0	Huddersfield Town (4)	20 September 1976
Derby County (1)	1–1	Notts County (2)	22 September 1976
Fulham (2)	2–2	Bolton Wanderers (2)	22 September 1976
Manchester United (1)	2–2	Sunderland (1)	22 September 1976
Millwall (2)	0–0	Orient (2)	21 September 1976
Newcastle United (1)	3–0	Stoke City (1)	22 September 1976
Nottingham Forest (2)	0–3	Coventry City (1)	21 September 1976
Queens Park Rangers (1)	2–1	Bury (3)	21 September 1976
Sheffield Wednesday (3)	3–1	Watford (4)	21 September 1976
Stockport County (4)	0–1	Everton (1)	20 September 1976
Torquay United (4)	1–2	Swansea City (4)	22 September 1976
Tottenham Hotspur (1)	2–3	Wrexham (3)	22 September 1976
West Bromwich Albion (1)	0–2	Brighton & Hove Albion (3)	22 September 1976

=== Replays ===
Home team	Score	Away team	Date
Arsenal (1)	0–0	Blackpool (2)	28 September 1976
Bolton Wanderers (2)	2–2	Fulham (2)	4 October 1976
Notts County (2)	1–2	Derby County (1)	4 October 1976
Sunderland (1)	2–2	Manchester United (1)	4 October 1976
Orient (2)	0–0	Millwall (2)	12 October 1976

=== 2nd Replays ===
Home team	Score	Away team	Date
Arsenal (1)	2–0	Blackpool (2)	4 October 1976
Fulham (2)	1–2	Bolton Wanderers (2)	18 October 1976
Manchester United (1)	1–0	Sunderland (1)	6 October 1976
Millwall (2)	3–0	Orient (2)	19 October 1976

== Fourth round ==
Number of teams per tier entering this round
First Division	Second Division	Third Division	Fourth Division	Total
9 / 22	3 / 22	3 / 24	1 / 24	16 / 92

=== Ties ===
Home team	Score	Away team	Date
Arsenal (1)	2–1	Chelsea (2)	26 October 1976
Aston Villa (1)	5–1	Wrexham (3)	27 October 1976
Brighton & Hove Albion (3)	1–1	Derby County (1)	26 October 1976
Everton (1)	3–0	Coventry City (1)	26 October 1976
Manchester United (1)	7–2	Newcastle United (1)	27 October 1976
Millwall (2)	3–0	Sheffield Wednesday (3)	27 October 1976
Swansea City (4)	1–1	Bolton Wanderers (2)	26 October 1976
West Ham United (1)	0–2	Queens Park Rangers (1)	27 October 1976

=== Replays ===
Home team	Score	Away team	Date
Bolton Wanderers (2)	5–1	Swansea City (4)	2 November 1976
Derby County (1)	2–1	Brighton & Hove Albion (3)	8 November 1976

== Fifth Round ==
Number of teams per tier entering this round
First Division	Second Division	Third Division	Fourth Division	Total
6 / 22	2 / 22	0 / 24	0 / 24	8 / 92

=== Ties ===
Home team	Score	Away team	Date
Aston Villa (1)	2–0	Millwall (2)	1 December 1976
Derby County (1)	1–2	Bolton Wanderers (2)	1 December 1976
Manchester United (1)	0–3	Everton (1)	1 December 1976
Queens Park Rangers (1)	2–1	Arsenal (1)	1 December 1976

== Semi-finals ==
Number of teams per tier entering this round
First Division	Second Division	Third Division	Fourth Division	Total
3 / 22	1 / 22	0 / 24	0 / 24	4 / 92

=== First leg ===
Home team	Score	Away team	Date
Everton (1)	1–1	Bolton Wanderers (2)	18 January 1977
Queens Park Rangers (1)	0–0	Aston Villa (1)	1 February 1977

=== Second leg ===
Home team	Score	Away team	Date	Agg
Aston Villa (1)	2–2	Queens Park Rangers (1)	16 February 1977	2–2
Bolton Wanderers (2)	0–1	Everton (1)	15 February 1977	1–2

=== Replay ===
Home team	Score	Away team	Date	Venue
Queens Park Rangers (1)	0–3	Aston Villa (1)	22 February 1977	Highbury

== Final ==
12 March 1977
15:00 BST

Aston Villa	0–0	Everton

Wembley Stadium, London
Attendance: 100,000

ASTON VILLA:
GK	1	John Burridge
DF	2	John Gidman
DF	3	John Robson
DF	4	Leighton Phillips
DF	5	Chris Nicholl
MF	6	Dennis Mortimer
MF	7	John Deehan
MF	8	Brian Little
FW	9	Andy Gray
MF	10	Alex Cropley
FW	11	Frank Carrodus
Manager:
Ron Saunders

EVERTON:
GK	1	David Lawson
DF	2	Dave Jones
DF	3	Terry Darracott
DF	4	Mick Lyons
DF	5	Ken McNaught
MF	6	Andy King
MF	7	Bryan Hamilton
MF	8	Martin Dobson
FW	9	Bob Latchford
FW	10	Duncan McKenzie
MF	11	Ronnie Goodlass
Manager:
Gordon Lee

=== First Replay ===
16 March 1977
19:45 BST

Aston Villa	1 – 1 AET	Everton
Kenyon og		Latchford

Hillsborough Stadium
Attendance: 55,000

ASTON VILLA:
GK	1	John Burridge
DF	2	John Gidman
DF	3	John Robson
DF	4	Leighton Phillips
DF	5	Chris Nicholl
MF	6	Dennis Mortimer
MF	7	John Deehan
MF	8	Brian Little
FW	9	Andy Gray
MF	10	Gordon Cowans
FW	11	Frank Carrodus
Manager:
Ron Saunders

EVERTON:
GK	1	David Lawson
DF	2	Mike Bernard
DF	3	Terry Darracott
DF	4	Mick Lyons
DF	5	Ken McNaught
MF	6	Andy King
MF	7	Bryan Hamilton
MF	8	Roger Kenyon
FW	9	Bob Latchford
FW	10	Duncan McKenzie
MF	11	Ronnie Goodlass
Substitute:
FW	12	Jim Pearson
Manager:
Gordon Lee

=== Second Replay ===
13 April 1977
19:30 BST

Aston Villa	3–2	Everton

Old Trafford
Attendance: 54,749

ASTON VILLA:
GK	1	John Burridge
DF	2	John Gidman
DF	3	John Robson
DF	4	Leighton Phillips
DF	5	Chris Nicholl
MF	6	Dennis Mortimer
MF	7	John Deehan
MF	8	Brian Little
FW	9	Ray Graydon
MF	10	Alex Cropley
FW	11	Gordon Cowans
Substitute:
DF	12	Gordon Smith
Manager:
Ron Saunders

EVERTON:
GK	1	David Lawson
DF	2	Neil Robinson
DF	3	Terry Darracott
DF	4	Mick Lyons
DF	5	Ken McNaught
MF	6	Andy King
MF	7	Bryan Hamilton
MF	8	Martin Dobson
FW	9	Bob Latchford
FW	10	Jim Pearson
MF	11	Ronnie Goodlass
Substitute:
DF	12	Steve Seargeant
Manager:
Gordon Lee
