= Gordon Smith (footballer, born July 1954) =

Scottish footballer

Personal information
- Full name: Gordon Melville Smith
- Date of birth: 3 July 1954
- Place of birth: Partick, Scotland
- Date of death: 5 April 2014 (aged 59)
- Place of death: Glasgow, Scotland
- Position: Full back

Youth career
- Rangers B.C.

Senior career*
| Years | Team | Apps | (Gls) |
| 1972–1976 | St Johnstone | 112 | (8) |
| 1976–1979 | Aston Villa | 79 | (0) |
| 1979–1982 | Tottenham Hotspur | 38 | (1) |
| 1982–1984 | Wolverhampton Wanderers | 38 | (3) |
| 1985 | Pittsburgh Spirit | 33 | (0) |
| 1985–1986 | Barnet | 22 | (0) |
| Total | | 335 | (13) |

International career
| 1975 | Scotland U23 | 4 | (0) |
- * Club domestic league appearances and goals

Gordon Melville Smith (3 July 1954 – 5 April 2014) was a Scottish professional footballer who played as a full back.

== Career ==
Born in Partick, he played for the amateur clubs Rangers B.C. and Glasgow United before turning professional with St Johnstone, at which time he was a forward before switching to a defensive role. He also played in England for Aston Villa, Tottenham Hotspur and Wolverhampton Wanderers, and in the United States for Pittsburgh Spirit.

While at Aston Villa, Smith helped them win the 1976–77 Football League Cup, in the final of which he featured as a substitute in the second and decisive replay.

Smith signed for Tottenham Hotspur for a fee of £150,000, but never established himself as a first team regular. Certainly, he played his part in getting Spurs to the 1981 FA Cup Final, but watched from the stands as Ricardo Villa scored one of the iconic Wembley goals. In three seasons at White Hart Lane, he managed barely 30+ games.

While with St Johnstone he gained four Scottish under-23 caps.

== Personal life and death ==
After his playing career, Smith ran a business which installed the special perimeter hoardings used in UEFA Champions League stadia.

He died on 5 April 2014 from natural causes. His grandfather Willie Salisbury was also a footballer, primarily for Partick Thistle.
