= Gary Jones (footballer, born 1951) =

English footballer

Personal information
- Full name: Gary Kenneth Jones
- Date of birth: 5 January 1951 (age 75)
- Place of birth: Prescot, England
- Position: Winger

Youth career
- 1966–1968: Everton

Senior career*
Years	Team	Apps	(Gls)
1968–1976	Everton	82	(12)
1976–1978	Birmingham City	35	(1)
1978–1979	Fort Lauderdale Strikers	8	(2)
- * Club domestic league appearances and goals

Gary Kenneth Jones (born 5 January 1951) is an English former footballer who played as a winger.

Born in Prescot, which was then in Lancashire, Jones joined Everton from school, and remained with the club for ten years, but played relatively infrequently; only in his last two seasons did he play more than 13 games a season for the first team. He joined Birmingham City in 1976, spending two seasons with the club before finishing his playing career with Fort Lauderdale Strikers in the North American Soccer League.

Following his retirement he managed a local public house, The Albert in Lark Lane, Liverpool.
