= Bill Salisbury (footballer) =

Scottish footballer

Personal information
- Full name: William Salisbury
- Date of birth: 23 February 1899
- Place of birth: Govan, Scotland
- Date of death: 5 January 1965 (aged 65)
- Place of death: Glasgow, Scotland
- Position: Outside left

Senior career*
Years	Team	Apps	(Gls)
–	St Anthony's		
1918–1928	Partick Thistle	286	(51)
1928–1929	Liverpool	16	(2)
1929–1930	Bangor		
1930	Distillery		
1930–1931	Shelbourne		
1931–1933	Bangor		
1933–1934	Partick Thistle	0	(0)
- * Club domestic league appearances and goals

William Salisbury (23 February 1899 – 5 January 1965) was a Scottish footballer who played as an outside left for Partick Thistle (where he spent a decade, winning the Scottish Cup in 1921), in England with Liverpool (where he played for a season) and spells with Bangor and Distillery in Northern Ireland plus Shelbourne in the Republic of Ireland.

His grandson Gordon Smith was also a footballer (he played for St Johnstone, Aston Villa, Tottenham Hotspur, Wolverhampton Wanderers).
