= John Barton (footballer, born 1953) =

English footballer and manager

Personal information
- Date of birth: 24 October 1953 (age 73)
- Place of birth: Birmingham, England
- Position: Defender

Senior career*
Years	Team	Apps	(Gls)
19??–1976	Stourbridge		
1976–1979	Worcester City		
1979–1983	Everton	20	(0)
1983–1985	Derby County	69	(1)
1985–19??	Kidderminster Harriers		
Total		89	(1)

Managerial career
- 1993–1994: Nuneaton Borough
- 1994–1998: Burton Albion
- 1999–2005: Worcester City
- 2007: Worcester City (caretaker)
- * Club domestic league appearances and goals

John S. Barton (born 24 October 1953) is an English former professional footballer. He played professionally, as a full-back, for Everton and Derby County before moving into non-league football and management.

Barton began his career with Stourbridge, moving to Worcester City in 1976. He helped Worcester to the Southern League First Division North title in 1976–77, and began to attract interest from a number of higher-level clubs. His final game for Worcester came in 1979 in their FA Cup win against Plymouth Argyle, Barton leaving the following week to join First Division Everton for a then record non-league fee of £25,000.

In 1983 Barton joined Derby County where he spent two years before joining Kidderminster Harriers, winning the FA Trophy in 1987. He later became assistant manager at Kidderminster with Graham Allner and worked in a similar role at Nuneaton Borough before becoming Nuneaton manager.

He was manager of Burton Albion from 1994 until September 1998 while also working for Burton College as a sports and recreation lecturer along with Steve Spooner former footballer, and was later manager of Worcester City for five years until resigning in January 2005.

In October 2007 Barton was appointed caretaker manager of Worcester City following the departure of Andy Preece.
