= Ronny Goodlass =

English footballer

Personal information
- Date of birth: 6 September 1953 (age 73)
- Place of birth: Liverpool, England
- Position: Winger

Senior career*
Years	Team	Apps	(Gls)
1975–1977	Everton	33	(2)
1977–1979	NAC Breda	53	(6)
1979–1980	ADO Den Haag	34	(4)
1980–1981	Fulham	22	(2)
1981–1982	Scunthorpe United	9	(0)
1982–1983	Seiko SA	?	(?)
1983–1985	Tranmere Rovers	21	(0)
1985–????	Barrow	?	(?)
Total		172	(14)
- * Club domestic league appearances and goals

Ronny Goodlass (born 6 September 1953, in Liverpool) is an English footballer who played for English Premier League club Everton.

== Career ==
=== Everton ===
Goodlass is known as the one handed winger, as he only has one hand due to an accident with a power tool. He played for Everton in the old First Division. Favoured while playing for Billy Bingham, Ronny was replaced by Dave Thomas once Gordon Lee became the manager of Everton.

Highlights of his Everton career include scoring from the half-way line at West Ham and playing a major role in 1977 in the run to the final of the League Cup against Aston Villa and the semi-final of the FA Cup against local rivals Liverpool. He was the player who provided the cross for the infamous disallowed "goal" by Bryan Hamilton by controversial referee Clive Thomas that would have seen Everton through to the FA Cup final.

== Post Everton ==
In October 1977 he moved to Dutch club, NAC Breda for £75,000. He then went on to play for ADO Den Haag before returning to play in England with Fulham. He returned to Everton once his playing career had come to an end under Joe Royle who appointed him as youth team coach. He also had a spell in charge of the now defunct Vauxhall Conference club Runcorn.

He is known as the Everton and Tranmere Rovers match day summariser for BBC Radio Merseyside. His catchphrase is: "It's one of them!" He can also be heard on the station's Friday night preview programme Blue Watch giving his opinion in "The Goodlass Guide" between 8.00pm and 8.30pm.

He is a known supporter of keeping Everton in the city of Liverpool.

Goodlass now heads up his own charity called Health Through Sport which aims to improve fitness and eating habits among young people from some of the most deprived and marginalised communities in Liverpool.

== Honours ==
Everton

- Football League Cup runner-up: 1976–77
