= David Lawson (footballer) =

English Footballer

Personal information
- Date of birth: 22 December 1947 (age 78)
- Place of birth: Wallsend, England
- Position: Goalkeeper

Senior career*
Years	Team	Apps	(Gls)
1966–1967	Newcastle United	0	(0)
1967–1969	Bradford Park Avenue	13	(0)
1970–1972	Huddersfield Town	51	(0)
1972–1978	Everton	124	(0)
1978	Luton Town	5	(0)
1978–1981	Stockport County	106	(0)
Total		299	(0)
- * Club domestic league appearances and goals as of 20 August 2007

David Lawson (born 22 December 1947 in Wallsend, England) is a former professional footballer who played as a goalkeeper during the 1960s, 1970s & 1980s.

== Honours ==
Everton

- Football League Cup runner-up: 1976–77
