= Mick Buckley (English footballer) =

English footballer (1953–2013)

Personal information
- Full name: Mick Buckley
- Date of birth: 4 November 1953
- Place of birth: Salford, England
- Date of death: 7 October 2013 (aged 59)
- Position: Midfielder

Senior career*
Years	Team	Apps	(Gls)
1971–1978	Everton	135	(10)
1978–1983	Sunderland	121	(7)
1983	Hartlepool United	6	(0)
1983–1984	Carlisle United	25	(2)
1984–1985	Middlesbrough	27	(0)
Total		314	(19)

International career
1972	England Youth	4	(1)
1974–1975	England U23	2	(0)
- * Club domestic league appearances and goals

Mick Buckley (4 November 1953 – 7 October 2013) was an English footballer who played for Everton, Sunderland, Hartlepool United, Carlisle United and Middlesbrough as a midfielder.

== Club career ==
Buckley was born in Salford. He started his professional footballing career with Everton in 1971 and made 135 appearances for them, with ten goals. A youth team product, who had rejected advances from Manchester United and Manchester City as a schoolboy, he made his debut in March 1972, with manager Harry Catterick viewing him as a long-term replacement for Colin Harvey. However it would not be until the arrival of Billy Bingham that Buckley fully came to the fore, and was a regular first-teamer during three of Bingham's seasons in charge. He suffered a series of injuries in 1977 and during his absence both Trevor Ross and Andy King forced their way into the first team picture, with Buckley sidelined when he returned to fitness. Unable to regain his first team spot, Buckley was sold to Sunderland in August 1978 for £80,000.

Buckley made his debut for Sunderland on 2 September 1978 against Preston North End in a 3–1 at Roker Park. He went on to make a total of 121 league appearances, scoring 7 goals for the club. He then moved to fellow North East team Hartlepool United in 1983 where he scored no goals in just six appearances, he spent one season at the club. Towards the end of his career, he spent seasons at Carlisle United and Middlesbrough.

Buckley died in October 2013 at the age of 59.
