= Roger Kenyon =

English footballer

Personal information
- Date of birth: 4 January 1949 (age 77)
- Place of birth: Blackpool, England
- Position: Central defender

Senior career*
Years	Team	Apps	(Gls)
1966–1979	Everton	267	(6)
1979	Vancouver Whitecaps	10	(0)
1979–1980	Bristol City	4	(0)
1980–1981	Vancouver Whitecaps	50	(0)
1981–1982	Blackpool	0	(0)
1982–1984	Altrincham		
- * Club domestic league appearances and goals

Roger Kenyon (born 4 January 1949) is an English footballer who played as a defender for Everton between 1967 and 1979 . He also played for the NASL team Vancouver Whitecaps during his career. He was part of the Everton side that won the First Division in the 1969–70 season; making 9 appearances in the process. He is remembered at Everton for scoring an own goal in the first replay of the 1977 League Cup Final; this game finished 1–1 and Everton lost the second replay 3–2 to Aston Villa.

He is now responsible for Blue Nose Promotions and organises events with sports personalities.

== Career statistics ==
Season	Games played	Goals scored
Everton
1967–1968	16	0
1968–1969	7	0
1969–1970	9	0
1970–1971	29	0
1971–1972	36	0
1972–1973	40	2
1973–1974	36	2
1974–1975	40	0
1975–1976	30	1
1976–1977	14	1
1977–1978	7	0
1978–1979	3	0
Vancouver Whitecaps
1979	10	0
1980	27	0
1981	23	0

== Honours ==
Everton

- Football League Cup runner-up: 1976–77

Sporting positions
Preceded by Howard Kendall	Everton captain 1974-1976	Succeeded by Mick Lyons
