= Duncan McKenzie =

English footballer

Personal information
- Date of birth: 10 June 1950 (age 76)
- Place of birth: Grimsby, England
- Height: 1.73 m (5 ft 8 in)
- Position: Striker

Senior career*
Years	Team	Apps	(Gls)
1969–1974	Nottingham Forest	111	(41)
1969–1970	→ Mansfield Town (loan)	10	(3)
1972–1973	→ Mansfield Town (loan)	6	(7)
1974–1976	Leeds United	66	(27)
1976	Anderlecht	9	(2)
1976–1978	Everton	48	(14)
1978–1979	Chelsea	15	(4)
1979–1981	Blackburn Rovers	74	(16)
1981	Tulsa Roughnecks	31	(14)
1981–1982	Tulsa Roughnecks (indoor)	1	(0)
1982	Chicago Sting	20	(3)
1983	Ryoden		
Total		391	(131)
- * Club domestic league appearances and goals

Duncan McKenzie (born 10 June 1950) is an English former footballer who played as a striker in the Football League for Nottingham Forest, Mansfield Town, Leeds United, Everton, Chelsea and Blackburn Rovers in the 1970s, in Belgium for Anderlecht, in the North American Soccer League for the Tulsa Roughnecks and the Chicago Sting, and for Ryoden in Hong Kong.

== Playing career ==
McKenzie started his career with Nottingham Forest. He was loaned to Mansfield Town in exchange for emergency goalkeeper Dave Hollins. He did not establish himself in the team until the 1973–74 season, when he hit a tremendous spell of good form, scoring 26 goals in the season. As Forest were a middling Second Division team at the time, his league performances did not gain so much attention, but the team also had a great FA Cup run that season, reaching the quarter finals. The highlight of this run was the 4th Round game against Manchester City on 27 January 1974, when he made three goals and scored the fourth in a 4–1 thrashing of the First Division giants. This was probably the greatest game of his career, but he seldom hit such great heights again, despite many sublime moments subsequently.

McKenzie was signed for Leeds United by Brian Clough during his 44-day reign as manager of Leeds, and was the only one of his signings to subsequently flourish at the club. Initially, he attracted media attention for his achievements outside of the game, which included the ability to jump over a Mini and to throw a golf ball the length of a football pitch. However, once established in the Leeds side, he soon attracted attention for the quality of his footballing skills; in the 1975–76 season he established himself as Allan Clarke's striking partner, and scored 16 goals in 39 matches.

McKenzie was a sublimely talented individual, capable of running rings around the most astute of defenders. However, despite his skills, he could be an immensely frustrating player to play with; whilst he reserved his finest moments for big games, he was often anonymous against lesser opposition. It was this inconsistency that caused him to be sold to Belgian side Anderlecht at the end of the 1975–76 season, winning the 1976 European Super Cup, but he returned to England in December 1976 when he signed for Everton.

Unfortunately for McKenzie, the manager who signed him – Billy Bingham – was sacked and replaced by Gordon Lee just a month later. McKenzie and Lee had their differences, with the result that McKenzie did not have as free a role as would have suited him. This led to his departure from Everton, but not before he had turned in some admirable performances – a notable game being the 1977 FA Cup semi-final v Liverpool.

In September 1978 he joined Chelsea where, much like the rest of his career, he dazzled the fans with his skills and eccentricity but still failed to make the most of his talents. He left the club less than a year later having made just 16 appearances and scored four goals.

McKenzie joined Blackburn Rovers for a fee of £80,000 and helped the club to promotion from the third division in 1980.

In 1981, he spent a single season, his last as a professional footballer, with the Tulsa Roughnecks of the North American Soccer League. He later played for Ryoden in Hong Kong for 3 months.

== Career after football ==
Since retiring from the game, McKenzie has worked as a newspaper columnist, as well as becoming an after-dinner speaker. He was the immediate replacement for Danny Baker on Radio Five's 6-0-6 programme.

== Honours ==
Everton

- Football League Cup runner-up: 1976–77
