= Terry Darracott =

English footballer (1950–2022)

Personal information
- Date of birth: 6 December 1950
- Place of birth: Edge Hill, Liverpool, Lancashire, England
- Date of death: 22 March 2022 (aged 71)
- Position: Left-back

Youth career
- Everton

Senior career*
Years	Team	Apps	(Gls)
1967–1979	Everton	148	(0)
1979	Tulsa Roughnecks	29	(1)
1979–1980	Wrexham	22	(0)
Total		199	(1)
- * Club domestic league appearances and goals

Terry Darracott (6 December 1950 – 22 March 2022) was an English professional footballer who played as a left back for Everton and Wrexham in the Football League and for the Tulsa Roughnecks in the North American Soccer League.

On retiring as a player he held coaching positions at Everton, Manchester City and Blackburn Rovers, and was employed as a European scout for Bolton Wanderers.

In October 2008, Darracott joined Wrexham as assistant to manager Dean Saunders, with whom he had worked at Blackburn. Restricted mobility due to a hip problem forced him to leave Wrexham a year later, and he returned to scouting for Bolton.

He provided opposition analysis as part of Hull City's scouting team.

Darracott died on 22 March 2022, at the age of 71.

== Honours ==
Everton

- Football League Cup runner-up: 1976–77
