= Steve Seargeant =

English footballer

Personal information
- Date of birth: 2 January 1951 (age 75)
- Place of birth: Liverpool, England
- Position: Left back

Youth career
- –1971: Everton

Senior career*
Years	Team	Apps	(Gls)
1971–1978	Everton	80	(1)
1978–1980	Detroit Express	79	(0)
1981	California Surf	29	(0)
Total		188	(1)

Managerial career
- 1984–2011: Oakland Golden Grizzlies (assistant)
- * Club domestic league appearances and goals

Steve Seargeant (born 2 January 1951) is an English retired professional footballer who played in England and the United States as a left back.

== Career ==
Born in Liverpool, Seargeant began his career with the youth teams of Everton. Seargeant turned professional in 1968, and made his debut in the 1971–72 season; he made a total of 80 league appearances for Everton between then and 1978. Seargeant later played in the NASL for the Detroit Express and the California Surf.

== Personal life ==
His son Christian Seargeant is also a professional footballer.
