= George Telfer =

English footballer

Personal information
- Date of birth: 6 July 1955 (age 71)
- Place of birth: Liverpool, England
- Position: Forward

Youth career
- Everton

Senior career*
Years	Team	Apps	(Gls)
1973–1981	Everton	99	(20)
1981	San Diego Sockers	2	(0)
1981–1983	Scunthorpe United	36	(11)
1983–????	Preston North End	2	(0)
- Runcorn
1985–????	Formby		
- * Club domestic league appearances and goals

George Telfer (born 6 July 1955) is an English retired footballer who played as a forward in the Football League during the 1970s and 1980s, most notably with Everton.

After making his senior debut for Everton on 22 December 1973 he went on to play for them on 116 occasions (scoring 22 times). However, he only made 3 appearances for them in his last two seasons, and then played for San Diego Sockers in the North American Soccer League.

He returned to play in England in 1981, firstly with Scunthorpe United, followed by a very short spell with Preston North End, after which he moved into non-league with Runcorn before moving on to Formby.
