= Jim Pearson =

Scottish footballer

Personal information
- Date of birth: 24 March 1953
- Place of birth: Falkirk, Scotland
- Height: 5 ft 11 1/2 in (1.82 m)
- Position: Forward

Youth career
- Gairdoch United

Senior career*
Years	Team	Apps	(Gls)
1970–1974	St Johnstone	105	(40)
1974–1978	Everton	93	(15)
1978–1980	Newcastle United	11	(3)
1980–1981	Barrow		
1981–1985	Gateshead		
Total		209	(58)

International career
1974–1975	Scotland under-23	6	(1)

Managerial career
- 1985–1988: Blyth Spartans
- * Club domestic league appearances and goals

Jim Pearson (born 24 March 1953 in Falkirk) is a Scottish former footballer. Pearson played for St Johnstone, Everton and Newcastle United until injury cut short his professional career.

Pearson went on to work for Nike where he played a pivotal role in the evolution of the Nike brand in the UK as Head of Football, a position which he held for 14 years.

Pearson is a Sports Consultant for Blacks Solicitors LLP in Leeds.

== Honours ==
Everton

- Football League Cup runner-up: 1976–77
