= Neil Robinson (footballer, born 1957) =

English footballer (1957–2022)

Personal information
- Date of birth: 20 April 1957
- Place of birth: Walton, Liverpool, England
- Date of death: 24 November 2022 (aged 65)
- Positions: Defender; midfielder

Senior career*
Years	Team	Apps	(Gls)
1974–1979	Everton	17	(1)
1979–1984	Swansea City	123	(7)
1984–1988	Grimsby Town	109	(6)
1988–1990	Darlington	37	(1)
Total		286	(15)
- * Club domestic league appearances and goals

Neil Robinson (20 April 1957 – 24 November 2022) was an English footballer who played as a defender or midfielder for Everton, Swansea City, Grimsby Town and Darlington.

== Career ==
Robinson was born the youngest of a family of seven children (six boys, one girl), just 100 yards away from Everton Football Club's ground, Goodison Park, (in Spellow Lane, Walton Liverpool). He began his football career as an apprentice professional at Everton in April 1973, aged 16. He signed as a full-time professional for Everton one year later in April 1974.

Robinson scored his only goal for Everton at Goodison Park in the last game of the 1977–78 season beating Chelsea 6–0.

Robinson became a vegetarian at age 13 in 1970 and in 1980, age 23, he became a vegan and was reportedly the first vegan footballer to have played professionally in English football. In the 1981–82 season he became the first vegan to score in a top-flight match.

Robinson was the Grimsby Town Player of the Year for 1985–86.

== Personal life and death ==
Robinson was the youngest brother of Sir Ken Robinson. He married his wife, Pauline, on 31 January 1978 and they had three children, including former professional footballer Neil David Robinson. He died from sudden cardiac arrest on 24 November 2022, at the age of 65.

== Honours ==
Everton

- Football League Cup runner-up: 1976–77
