= Martin Dobson =

English footballer and manager

Personal information
- Full name: John Martin Dobson
- Date of birth: 14 February 1948 (age 78)
- Place of birth: Rishton, England
- Height: 5 ft 9 in (1.75 m)
- Position: Midfielder

Senior career*
Years	Team	Apps	(Gls)
1966–1967	Bolton Wanderers	0	(0)
1967–1974	Burnley	224	(43)
1974–1979	Everton	190	(29)
1979–1983	Burnley	186	(20)
1983–1985	Bury	61	(4)
Total		661	(96)

International career
1970	England U23	1	(0)
1974	England	5	(0)

Managerial career
- 1984–1989: Bury
- 1991: Bristol Rovers
- 1991: Northwich Victoria
- 1998–2000: Bolton Wanderers Academy
- 2010: Burnley (Caretaker)
- * Club domestic league appearances and goals

Martin Dobson (born 14 February 1948) is an English former professional football player and coach. A midfielder who was an England international, he was the first player to be transferred for £300,000, when Everton bought him from Burnley in August 1974.

== Club career ==
He was born in Rishton and attended Clitheroe Royal Grammar School. He was signed as youngster by Bolton Wanderers who spotted him playing for Lancashire Grammar Schools. However, he was given a free transfer and moved on to Burnley. He played for almost 20 years and totalling over 600 league appearances while playing for Burnley, Everton and Bury.

== International career ==
He won five England caps overall, four while at Burnley and one while at Everton. His first England cap was awarded to him by manager Sir Alf Ramsey (because of FA Cup commitments of other players) on 3 April 1974, a 0–0 draw against Portugal. However, he impressed enough to win four more caps that year.

== Coaching career ==
As well as finishing his playing career with Bury, Dobson became their manager until 1989. During this period they were promoted from the old Fourth Division and became an established Third Division side.

Dobson was appointed manager of Bristol Rovers in July 1991, but was sacked after only 12 games in charge in October of the same year. On 10 January 2010 he was appointed joint caretaker manager of Premier League side and former club Burnley, with Terry Pashley, after Owen Coyle left the club for Bolton Wanderers. However, Dobson and Pashley never managed a game due to the rapid appointment of Brian Laws. Laws kept Dobson on his coaching staff in the short-term as he built up his backroom staff. Dobson then returned full-time to his role as Burnley's director of youth development.

Dobson left his post as director of youth at Burnley in October 2011 after his contract was not renewed by manager Eddie Howe who instead appointed his reserve team manager Jason Blake, from former club AFC Bournemouth, as academy manager. Dobson became the professional development co-ordinator at Everton in February 2018.

=== Managerial statistics ===
Managerial record by team and tenure
Team	From	To	Record				
Team	From	To	P	W	D	L	Win %
Bury	1 March 1984	31 March 1989	269	96	76	97	35.7
Bristol Rovers	2 July 1991	4 October 1991	8	1	1	6	12.5
Total			277	97	77	103	35.0

== Honours ==
Everton

- Football League Cup runner-up: 1976–77

Burnley

- Football League Third Division: 1981–82
