= Andy King (footballer, born 1956) =

English footballer (1956–2015)

Personal information
- Full name: Andrew Edward King
- Date of birth: 14 August 1956
- Place of birth: Luton, Bedfordshire, England
- Date of death: 27 May 2015 (aged 58)
- Place of death: Luton, England
- Height: 5 ft 9 in (1.75 m)
- Position: Attacking midfielder

Youth career
- –1974: Luton Town

Senior career*
Years	Team	Apps	(Gls)
1974–1976	Luton Town	33	(9)
1976–1980	Everton	151	(38)
1980–1981	Queens Park Rangers	30	(9)
1981–1982	West Bromwich Albion	25	(4)
1982–1985	Everton	44	(11)
1985	Cambuur Leeuwarden	13	(1)
1985	Örebro SK	11	(4)
1985	Wolverhampton Wanderers	28	(10)
1985–1986	Luton Town	3	(0)
1986–1987	Aldershot	36	(11)
1987–1989	Aylesbury United	2	(0)
1988–1989	Waterford United	2	(0)
1988–1989	Cobh Ramblers	6	(1)
1989	KePS	1	(0)
1989–1990	Southport	2	(1)
Total		387	(99)

International career
1976–1978	England U21	2	(1)

Managerial career
- 1989: Waterford United
- 1993–1996: Mansfield Town
- 2000–2001: Swindon Town
- 2001–2005: Swindon Town
- 2006–2007: Grays Athletic
- 2013–2014: Northampton Town (caretaker)
- * Club domestic league appearances and goals

Andrew Edward King (14 August 1956 – 27 May 2015) was an English professional footballer who played as a midfielder. He made 350 appearances and scored 92 goals in the Football League in the 1970s and 1980s, and also played abroad. He was capped twice by England at under-21 level. After retiring as a player, he had a lengthy career in management.

== Playing career ==
King was born in Luton, Bedfordshire, and began his career as an apprentice with his home town side, Luton Town, turning professional in July 1974. He left to join Everton in April 1976 for a fee of £35,000 and became a crowd favourite with his tremendous skills in midfield and a knack for scoring goals. Most notably he scored a spectacular goal in 1978 to win Everton's first Merseyside derby since 1971.

During this period he won two England under-21 caps, but never played for the national team. He joined Queens Park Rangers in September 1980 for a 400,000 pound fee and made his debut against Sheffield Wednesday. King was the first QPR player to score on the famous 'plastic pitch' in the opening game, although Rangers lost 1–2 to Luton Town. In all King played 30 league games for QPR scoring 9 goals before a transfer to West Bromwich Albion in September 1981.

King returned to Everton in July 1982 for two seasons, subsequently playing for Dutch side Cambuur Leeuwarden then Swedish team Örebro SK, before joining Wolverhampton Wanderers in January 1985. He returned to Luton Town in December the same year, but made just three league appearances before moving to Aldershot in August 1986. He retired from the professional game at the end of the following season in May 1987.

Overall his league playing career spanned 14 years, in which he scored more than 80 goals across more than 310 league appearances.

== Coaching and managerial career ==
King was appointed player/manager of Irish top division team Waterford United in January 1989, after Peter Thomas resigned. However, after only two league appearances he left the club by mutual consent seven weeks later.

He then signed for Cobh Ramblers as a player. scoring his only League of Ireland goal came on St Patrick's Day against Shamrock Rovers

He was appointed as manager of Mansfield Town in August 1993. He led Mansfield to the Third Division play-offs in the 1994–95 season, losing in the semi-finals to Chesterfield. They failed to build on this the following season and King left in July 1996 after Mansfield had finished in 19th place.

He later worked as a coach and a scout, and was scouting for Sunderland when, in the 2000 close season, he joined Swindon Town as assistant manager under his former Everton teammate Colin Todd. In November 2000, after Todd had left to become assistant manager of Derby County, King took over as manager. He maintained Swindon's Second Division status that season, but was replaced by former Liverpool manager Roy Evans in June 2001. Evans remained in charge for just a few months and King was re-appointed as Swindon manager on 20 December 2001 after the arrival of new owners of the club (including the former jockey Willie Carson).

The peak of his Swindon career came in the 2003–04 season, when Swindon qualified for the Division Two playoffs, only to lose on penalties to Brighton & Hove Albion in the semi-finals.

King was eventually dismissed by Swindon on 26 September 2005, after five successive defeats had left Swindon second from bottom in Football League One.

He then worked as a scout until being appointed as manager of Conference National side Grays Athletic on 23 November 2006. However, he surprisingly resigned for personal reasons on 4 January 2007.

He was a scout for former team Everton, but on 3 December 2007 King was appointed Chief Scout at Championship side Plymouth Argyle. He was then appointed as Head Scout at Colchester United in 2010.

On 30 November 2011, King was appointed as Assistant Manager to Aidy Boothroyd at Northampton Town.

After Boothroyd's dismissal as Northampton Town manager, King was placed in the role of caretaker manager, before moving on to MK Dons to take up a scouting role in February 2014.

== Death ==
King died at his home on 27 May 2015 following a heart attack. He had previously suffered a heart attack in 2009. He was survived by his wife and a daughter.

== Honours ==
=== As a player ===
Everton

- Football League Cup runner-up: 1976–77, 1983–84

Aldershot

- Football League Fourth Division play-offs: 1987

=== As a manager ===
Individual

- Football League One Manager of the Month: February 2005
