= Bob Latchford =

England footballer (born 1951)

Personal information
- Full name: Robert Dennis Latchford
- Date of birth: 18 January 1951 (age 75)
- Place of birth: Birmingham, England
- Position: Centre forward

Youth career
- 1967–1968: Birmingham City

Senior career*
Years	Team	Apps	(Gls)
1968–1974	Birmingham City	160	(68)
1974–1981	Everton	236	(106)
1981	Brisbane Lions	4	(4)
1981–1984	Swansea City	87	(35)
1984	NAC Breda	16	(13)
1984–1985	Coventry City	12	(2)
1985–1986	Lincoln City	15	(2)
1986	→ Newport County (loan)	20	(5)
1986–1987	Merthyr Tydfil		
Total		550	(235)

International career
1969	England Youth	5	(7)
1973–1974	England U23	6	(2)
1977–1979	England	12	(5)
- * Club domestic league appearances and goals

Robert Dennis Latchford (born 18 January 1951) is an English former footballer who played as a centre forward. He made more than 500 appearances in the Football League, playing for Birmingham City, Everton, Swansea City and Coventry City in the First Division, and represented England at youth and under-23 levels before making 12 appearances at senior level.

== Career ==
Latchford was born in Kings Heath, Birmingham. He was transferred from Birmingham City to Everton for £350,000, a British transfer record at the time (Howard Kendall and Archie Styles were transferred to Birmingham City as part of the same deal, with Birmingham being paid just £80,000). At Everton, Latchford was the top scorer for six successive seasons. He scored 30 goals in the 1977–78 season, winning a £10,000 prize offered by a national newspaper for the first footballer to reach that number in a single season. During the mid-seventies, Latchford was widely considered one of the top English forwards of his generation. He earned his first full cap for England in a World Cup qualifier against Italy in 1977. In April 2006 a book was published telling the story of his 1977/78 season. Co-written with journalist Martin O'Boyle, the book supports Everton's former players charity.

The closest he came to a winner's medal at Everton was as a finalist in the League Cup in 1977. The match went to three games; after a goalless draw at Wembley, Latchford scored in both replays - a late equaliser in the first replay at Hillsborough, which ended 1-1, and the opening goal at Old Trafford in an eventual 3-2 defeat to Aston Villa. Latchford made 268 appearances (3 as substitute) for Everton scoring 138 goals. After a guest stint in Australia for Brisbane Lions in 1981, scoring 4 goals in as many appearances, Latchford left Everton for Swansea, newly promoted to the top tier of English football, scoring a hat-trick on his debut for the Swans. He scored 35 goals in 87 league appearances during his three years at Swansea, meaning that - as at Everton - he averaged a goal nearly every other game.

Latchford later also played for Dutch club NAC Breda (15 Appearances – 13 Goals), Newport County and finally Merthyr Tydfil before retiring as a player in 1987.

During his time at Everton, he was the club's leading post Second World War goalscorer with 138 goals, a record he held until 1989 when Graeme Sharp exceeded Latchford's tally. By the time Latchford left Everton, only Dixie Dean (pre Second World War) had scored more goals for the club in history.

Latchford played 12 times for England, scoring 5 goals. He represented the players at Professional Footballers' Association, and in 1983 was part of a delegation which negotiated improved terms for players in the FA's deal with broadcasters for live coverage of that season's FA Cup.

Now living in Germany with his family, Latchford makes regular trips back to England to speak on the after-dinner circuit and also has a regular column on Everton independent website, NSNO.co.uk.

Latchford's two brothers, Dave and Peter, were both professional goalkeepers. Like Bob, Dave Latchford played for Birmingham City; whilst Peter Latchford represented West Bromwich Albion before spending over ten years at Celtic. (In March 1974, Bob managed the rare footballing feat of scoring twice against a sibling in a top-flight match.)

== Honours ==
Birmingham City

- FA Youth Cup runner-up: 1967
- Football League Second Division promotion: 1971–72

Everton

- Football League Cup runner-up: 1976–77

Swansea City

- Welsh Cup: 1981–82, 1982–83

NAC Breda

- Eerste Divisie promotion: 1983–84

Merthyr Tydfil

- Welsh Cup: 1986–87
