= Mick Lyons (English footballer) =

English footballer

Personal information
- Full name: Michael Lyons
- Date of birth: 8 December 1951 (age 74)
- Place of birth: Liverpool, Lancashire, England
- Height: 6 ft 1 in (1.85 m)
- Position: Defender

Senior career*
Years	Team	Apps	(Gls)
1971–1982	Everton	390	(48)
1982–1985	Sheffield Wednesday	129	(12)
1985–1987	Grimsby Town	50	(4)
1991	Nova Scotia Clippers	6	(1)
Total		569	(64)

International career
1974–1975	England U23	5	(0)
1978	England B	1	(0)

Managerial career
- 1985–1987: Grimsby Town
- 1991: Nova Scotia Clippers (Assistant)
- 1993–1995: Brunei
- 1995–1997: Canberra Cosmos
- 2002: Brunei
- 2004–2010: Stirling Lions
- 2011: Cockburn City
- * Club domestic league appearances and goals

Michael Lyons (born 8 December 1951) is an English former footballer in the 1970s and 1980s. He is most famous as captain of Everton during this period.

== Early life ==
Lyons was educated at the all-boys' De La Salle School in Liverpool. He was an Everton fan and his dream was to play for the football club.

== Club career ==
=== Everton ===
Lyons signed as a professional at Everton in 1970 after having served an apprenticeship at the club. He made his first team debut in the Football League First Division in 1971. Utilized mostly as a defender, Lyons would be pushed forward into an attacking role in the last 10 minutes of a game.

Lyons had a desire to play for Everton, the club he supported when he was a boy. Lyons' versatility made him a reliable player; he could play down the middle and was once Everton's top goalscorer.

=== Sheffield Wednesday ===
Lyons moved to Sheffield Wednesday in 1982. He appeared for them 129 times, scoring 12 goals. Lyons helped Wednesday win promotion to the Football League First Division. He was appointed as Youth Team Coach for the 1984/85 season.

== International career ==
Lyons won one England "B" cap in 1978.

== Managerial career ==
=== Grimsby Town ===
Lyons became player-manager of Grimsby Town in 1985, replacing David Booth. The side could never get above mid-table and finished 15th. The 1986–87 season began well and most of the season was spent in the top half and on the fringes of the play-off race. However, a run of 8 losses and 2 draws in the last 10 games meant that Grimsby fell from 8th to 21st and the first of two consecutive relegations.

=== Nova Scotia Clippers ===
In 1991, he was an assistant coach with the Nova Scotia Clippers of the Canadian Soccer League and also appeared as a player in six matches, scoring once.

=== Canberra Cosmos ===
Lyons was appointed coach of Canberra Cosmos in Australia's National Soccer League in 1995. A 9th-place finish in his first season showed sporadic promise, but this was not maintained as the club finished last the following season.

=== Stirling Lions ===
Lyons spent five years as the coach of the Stirling Lions in the Football West Premier League in Perth, Western Australia. He was dismissed in April 2011.

=== Cockburn City ===
He was appointed as manager of Cockburn City in 2011 and his first came against Perth Soccer Club. He was sacked in July 2012 leaving the club in fourth position, three points behind the league leaders.

=== UWA Nedlands FC ===
Lyons was appointed as manager of UWA Nedlands Football club in 2013 for the upcoming 13/14 season. A mixed season saw the first team finishing 7th.

== Legacy ==
It was at Everton that Lyons is best remembered and revered for his commitment and dedication to "the cause". Lyons famously dived under Norman Hunter's boot to score from inside the six-yard box in a league game against Leeds United.

== Honours ==
Everton

- Football League Cup runner-up: 1976–77

Sheffield Wednesday

- Football League Second Division promotion: 1983–84

Sporting positions
Preceded by Roger Kenyon	Everton captain 1976–1982	Succeeded by Billy Wright
