= PFA Team of the Year (1970s) =

Annual English football award

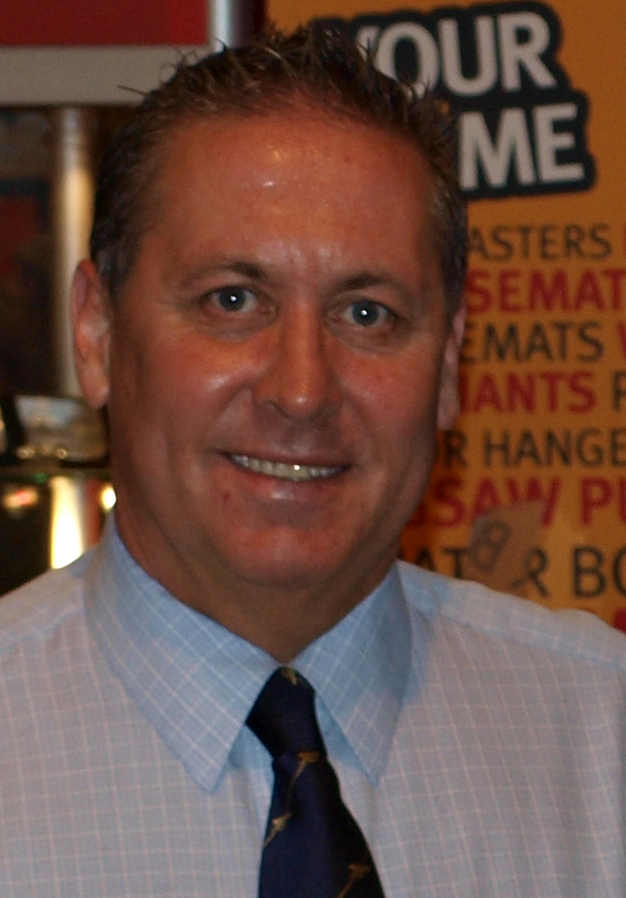
Kenny Sansom appeared in a PFA Team of the Year on 11 occasions, which is more than any other player.

The Professional Footballers' Association Team of the Year (often called the PFA Team of the Year, or simply the Team of the Year) is an annual award given to a set of 55 footballers across the top four tiers of men's English football; the Premier League, the Championship, League One and League Two, as well as the women's FA WSL, who are seen to be deserving of being named in a "Team of the Year". Peter Shilton currently holds the most appearances in the PFA Team of the Year in the top division with 10 appearances. Steven Gerrard currently holds the most appearances in the PFA Team of the Year in the Premier League era with eight appearances.

The award has been presented since the 1973–74 season and the shortlist is compiled by the members of the players' trade union, the Professional Footballers' Association (PFA), in January of every year, with the winners then being voted for by the other players in their respective divisions. The award is regarded by players in the Football League as the highest accolade available to them, due to it being picked by their fellow professionals. Oxford United's Damian Batt, who was named in the Team of the Year for League Two in 2011, said he was "very pleased to be given such a prestigious award. It is something that I am very proud of". In 2014, a team for female players competing in the FA WSL was selected for the first time.

== Key ==
- Heading key: Pos. – Position; App. – Number of appearances in a PFA Team of the Year.
- Position key: GK – Goalkeeper; DF – Defender; MF – Midfielder; FW – Forward.
- Players marked † appeared in a first tier PFA Team of the Year more than once.
- Players marked ‡ appeared in a second tier PFA Team of the Year more than once.
- Players marked * appeared in a third tier PFA Team of the Year more than once.
- Players marked ¤ appeared in a fourth tier PFA Team of the Year more than once.

== Winners ==
=== 1973–74 ===
==== First Division ====
Pos.	Player	Club	App.
GK	Pat Jennings	Tottenham Hotspur	1
DF	Paul Madeley	Leeds United	1
DF	Roy McFarland	Derby County	1
DF	Norman Hunter	Leeds United	1
DF	Colin Todd	Derby County	1
MF	Billy Bremner	Leeds United	1
MF	Tony Currie	Sheffield United	1
MF	Johnny Giles	Leeds United	1
FW	Mick Channon	Southampton	1
FW	Malcolm Macdonald	Newcastle United	1
FW	Allan Clarke	Leeds United	1

==== Second Division ====
Pos.	Player	Club	App.
GK	Bryan King	Millwall	1
DF	John Craggs	Middlesbrough	1
DF	David Watson	Sunderland	1
DF	Willie Maddren	Middlesbrough	1
DF	John Gorman	Carlisle United	1
MF	Bruce Rioch	Aston Villa	1
MF	Don Masson	Notts County	1
MF	Asa Hartford	West Bromwich Albion	1
FW	Dennis Tueart	Sunderland	1
FW	Duncan McKenzie	Nottingham Forest	1
FW	Don Rogers	Swindon Town	1

==== Third Division ====
Pos.	Player	Club	App.
GK	Roger Jones	Blackburn Rovers	1
DF	Ian Wood	Oldham Athletic	1
DF	Mel Machin	Bournemouth	1
DF	Barry Swallow	York City	1
DF	Colin Sullivan	Plymouth Argyle	1
MF	Ernie Machin	Plymouth Argyle	1
MF	Alan Durban	Shrewsbury Town	1
MF	Barry Lyons	York City	1
FW	Bruce Bannister	Bristol Rovers	1
FW	Alan Warboys	Bristol Rovers	1
FW	Phil Boyer	Bournemouth	1

==== Fourth Division ====
Pos.	Player	Club	App.
GK	Steve Death	Reading	1
DF	Ian Branfoot	Lincoln City	1
DF	John Hulme	Reading	1
DF	Jimmy Giles	Exeter City	1
DF	David Peach	Gillingham	1
MF	Fred Hill	Peterborough United	1
MF	Paul Walker	Peterborough United	1
MF	Brian Godfrey	Newport County	1
FW	Fred Binney	Exeter City	1
FW	Jim Hall	Peterborough United	1
FW	Brian Yeo	Gillingham	1

=== 1974–75 ===
==== First Division ====
Pos.	Player	Club	App.
GK	Peter Shilton	Stoke City	1
DF	Paul Madeley †	Leeds United	2
DF	Gordon McQueen	Leeds United	1
DF	Colin Todd †	Derby County	2
DF	Kevin Beattie	Ipswich Town	1
MF	Billy Bonds	West Ham United	1
MF	Colin Bell	Manchester City	1
MF	Alan Hudson	Stoke City	1
FW	Duncan McKenzie †	Leeds United	2
FW	Bob Latchford	Everton	1
FW	Leighton James	Burnley	1

==== Second Division ====
Pos.	Player	Club	App.
GK	Bryan King ‡	Millwall	2
DF	John Gidman	Aston Villa	1
DF	David Watson ‡	Sunderland	2
DF	Martin Buchan	Manchester United	1
DF	Stewart Houston	Manchester United	1
MF	Len Cantello	West Bromwich Albion	1
MF	Mick Channon	Southampton	2
MF	Billy Hughes	Sunderland	1
FW	Ray Graydon	Aston Villa	1
FW	Stuart Pearson	Manchester United	1
FW	Phil Boyer	Norwich City	2

==== Third Division ====
Pos.	Player	Club	App.
GK	Roger Jones *	Blackburn Rovers	2
DF	Andy Burgin	Blackburn Rovers	1
DF	Graham Hawkins	Blackburn Rovers	1
DF	Derek Jeffries	Crystal Palace	1
DF	Phil Burrows	Plymouth Argyle	1
MF	Chris Turner	Peterborough United	1
MF	Arfon Griffiths	Wrexham	1
MF	Peter Taylor	Crystal Palace	1
FW	Peter Eastoe	Swindon Town	1
FW	Billy Rafferty	Plymouth Argyle	1
FW	Alan Buckley	Walsall	1

==== Fourth Division ====
Pos.	Player	Club	App.
GK	Peter Grotier	Lincoln City	1
DF	Sandy Pate	Mansfield Town	1
DF	Jimmy Giles ¤	Exeter City	2
DF	Trevor Storton	Chester City	1
DF	John Breckin	Rotherham United	1
MF	Bobby Doyle	Barnsley	1
MF	Alan Durban	Shrewsbury Town	2
MF	Gordon Hodgson	Mansfield Town	1
FW	Derek Draper	Chester City	1
FW	Ray Clarke	Mansfield Town	1
FW	Paul Stratford	Northampton Town	1

=== 1975–76 ===
==== First Division ====
Pos.	Player	Club	App.
GK	Pat Jennings †	Tottenham Hotspur	2
DF	Paul Madeley †	Leeds United	3
DF	Roy McFarland †	Derby County	2
DF	Colin Todd †	Derby County	3
DF	Kevin Beattie †	Ipswich Town	2
MF	Kevin Keegan	Liverpool	1
MF	Don Masson	Queens Park Rangers	2
MF	Alan Hudson †	Stoke City	2
FW	Duncan McKenzie †	Leeds United	3
FW	John Toshack	Liverpool	1
FW	Dennis Tueart	Manchester City	2

==== Second Division ====
Pos.	Player	Club	App.
GK	Jimmy Montgomery	Sunderland	1
DF	Gary Locke	Chelsea	1
DF	Paul Jones	Bolton Wanderers	1
DF	Geoff Merrick	Bristol City	1
DF	John Gorman ‡	Carlisle United	2
MF	Tony Towers	Sunderland	1
MF	Bobby Kerr	Sunderland	1
MF	Johnny Giles	West Bromwich Albion	2
FW	Mick Channon ‡	Southampton	3
FW	Paul Cheesley	Bristol City	1
FW	Peter Thompson	Bolton Wanderers	1

==== Third Division ====
Pos.	Player	Club	App.
GK	Eric Steele	Peterborough United	1
DF	Ray Evans	Millwall	1
DF	Ian Evans	Crystal Palace	1
DF	Derek Jeffries *	Crystal Palace	2
DF	Clive Charles	Cardiff City	1
MF	Peter O'Sullivan	Brighton & Hove Albion	1
MF	Dennis Burnett	Brighton & Hove Albion	1
MF	Peter Taylor *	Crystal Palace	2
MF	David Gregory	Peterborough United	1
FW	Alan Buckley *	Walsall	2
FW	Dixie McNeil	Hereford United	1

==== Fourth Division ====
Pos.	Player	Club	App.
GK	Peter Grotier ¤	Lincoln City	2
DF	Ian Branfoot ¤	Lincoln City	2
DF	Sam Ellis	Lincoln City	1
DF	Terry Cooper	Lincoln City	1
DF	Phil Sandercock	Torquay United	1
MF	Geoff Hutt	Huddersfield Town	1
MF	Ian Miller	Doncaster Rovers	1
MF	Tony Whelan	Rochdale	1
FW	John Ward	Lincoln City	1
FW	Ronnie Moore	Tranmere Rovers	1
FW	Peter Kitchen	Doncaster Rovers	1

=== 1976–77 ===
==== First Division ====
Pos.	Player	Club	App.
GK	Ray Clemence	Liverpool	1
DF	John Gidman	Aston Villa	2
DF	Roy McFarland †	Derby County	3
DF	Kevin Beattie †	Ipswich Town	3
DF	Mick Mills	Ipswich Town	1
MF	Kevin Keegan †	Liverpool	2
MF	Brian Talbot	Ipswich Town	1
MF	Trevor Brooking	West Ham United	1
FW	Trevor Francis	Birmingham City	1
FW	Andy Gray	Aston Villa	1
FW	Dennis Tueart †	Manchester City	3

==== Second Division ====
Pos.	Player	Club	App.
GK	George Wood	Blackpool	1
DF	Gary Locke ‡	Chelsea	2
DF	Paul Jones ‡	Bolton Wanderers	2
DF	Paul Futcher	Luton Town	1
DF	David Peach	Southampton	2
MF	George Best	Fulham	1
MF	Gary Stanley	Chelsea	1
MF	Ray Wilkins	Chelsea	1
FW	John Richards	Wolverhampton Wanderers	1
FW	Mick Channon ‡	Southampton	4
FW	John Robertson	Nottingham Forest	1

==== Third Division ====
Pos.	Player	Club	App.
GK	Tom McAlister	Rotherham United	1
DF	John McMahon	Preston North End	1
DF	Ian Evans *	Crystal Palace	2
DF	Graham Cross	Brighton & Hove Albion	1
DF	Kenny Sansom	Crystal Palace	1
MF	Arfon Griffiths *	Wrexham	2
MF	Brian Horton	Brighton & Hove Albion	1
MF	Alan Crawford	Rotherham United	1
FW	Peter Ward	Brighton & Hove Albion	1
FW	Billy Ashcroft	Wrexham	1
FW	Alan Buckley *	Walsall	3

==== Fourth Division ====
Pos.	Player	Club	App.
GK	Terry Poole	Huddersfield Town	1
DF	Brendon Batson	Cambridge United	1
DF	Lindsay Smith	Colchester United	1
DF	Steve Dowman	Colchester United	1
DF	Andy Ford	Southend United	1
MF	Ian Miller ¤	Doncaster Rovers	2
MF	Dennis Bond	Watford	1
MF	Don Hutchins	Bradford City	1
FW	Alan Curtis	Swansea City	1
FW	Brian Joicey	Barnsley	1
FW	Peter Kitchen ¤	Doncaster Rovers	2

=== 1977–78 ===
==== First Division ====
Pos.	Player	Club	App.
GK	Peter Shilton †	Nottingham Forest	2
DF	John Gidman †	Aston Villa	3
DF	Gordon McQueen †	Manchester United	2
DF	Martin Buchan	Manchester United	2
DF	Derek Statham	West Bromwich Albion	1
MF	Steve Coppell	Manchester United	1
MF	Liam Brady	Arsenal	1
MF	Trevor Brooking †	West Ham United	2
FW	Trevor Francis †	Birmingham City	2
FW	Joe Jordan	Manchester United	1
FW	John Robertson	Nottingham Forest	2

==== Second Division ====
Pos.	Player	Club	App.
GK	Barry Daines	Tottenham Hotspur	1
DF	Terry Naylor	Tottenham Hotspur	1
DF	Paul Jones ‡	Bolton Wanderers	3
DF	Paul Futcher ‡	Luton Town	2
DF	Kenny Sansom	Crystal Palace	2
MF	Glenn Hoddle	Tottenham Hotspur	1
MF	Peter Reid	Bolton Wanderers	1
MF	Alan Ball	Southampton	1
FW	Peter Ward	Brighton & Hove Albion	2
FW	John Duncan	Tottenham Hotspur	1
FW	Peter Taylor	Tottenham Hotspur	3

==== Third Division ====
Pos.	Player	Club	App.
GK	Dai Davies	Wrexham	1
DF	Brendon Batson	Cambridge United	2
DF	Ian Ross	Peterborough United	1
DF	Chris Turner *	Peterborough United	2
DF	Keith Kennedy	Bury	1
MF	Mickey Thomas	Wrexham	1
MF	Bobby Shinton	Wrexham	1
MF	David Moss	Swindon Town	1
FW	Alan Buckley *	Walsall	4
FW	Dixie McNeil *	Wrexham	2
FW	Dave Kemp	Portsmouth	1

==== Fourth Division ====
Pos.	Player	Club	App.
GK	Peter Springett	Barnsley	1
DF	Chris Lawler	Stockport County	1
DF	Sam Ellis ¤	Watford	2
DF	Mick McCarthy	Barnsley	1
DF	Keith Pritchett	Watford	1
MF	Ian Miller ¤	Doncaster Rovers	3
MF	Roger Joslyn	Watford	1
MF	Robbie James	Swansea City	1
FW	Alan Curtis ¤	Swansea City	2
FW	Brendan O'Callaghan	Doncaster Rovers	1
FW	Alan Mayes	Watford	1

=== 1978–79 ===
==== First Division ====
Pos.	Player	Club	App.
GK	Peter Shilton †	Nottingham Forest	3
DF	Viv Anderson	Nottingham Forest	1
DF	David O'Leary	Arsenal	1
DF	David Watson	Manchester City	3
DF	Derek Statham †	West Bromwich Albion	2
MF	Liam Brady †	Arsenal	2
MF	Tony Currie †	Leeds United	2
MF	Osvaldo Ardiles	Tottenham Hotspur	1
FW	Cyrille Regis	West Bromwich Albion	1
FW	Kenny Dalglish	Liverpool	1
FW	Laurie Cunningham	West Bromwich Albion	1

==== Second Division ====
Pos.	Player	Club	App.
GK	Mark Wallington	Leicester City	1
DF	Kevin Hird	Blackburn Rovers	1
DF	Mark Lawrenson	Brighton & Hove Albion	1
DF	Mike Doyle	Stoke City	1
DF	Kenny Sansom ‡	Crystal Palace	3
MF	Trevor Brooking	West Ham United	3
MF	Howard Kendall	Stoke City	1
MF	Brian Horton	Brighton & Hove Albion	2
FW	Pop Robson	West Ham United	1
FW	Mike Flanagan	Charlton Athletic	1
FW	Peter Withe	Newcastle United	1

==== Third Division ====
Pos.	Player	Club	App.
GK	Chris Turner	Sheffield Wednesday	1
DF	John Stirk	Watford	1
DF	Steve Sims	Watford	1
DF	Ian MacDonald (Note: Players tied for position.)	Carlisle United	1
DF	Trevor Storton	Chester City	2
DF	John Breckin	Rotherham United	2
MF	Brian Hornsby	Sheffield Wednesday	1
MF	Ray McHale	Swindon Town	1
MF	Ian Callaghan	Swansea City	1
FW	Luther Blissett	Watford	1
FW	Ross Jenkins	Watford	1
FW	Alan Curtis	Swansea City	3

==== Fourth Division ====
Pos.	Player	Club	App.
GK	Steve Death ¤	Reading	2
DF	Gary Peters	Reading	1
DF	Steve Foster	Portsmouth	1
DF	Mick McCarthy ¤	Barnsley	2
DF	Kevin Moore	Grimsby Town	1
MF	Joe Waters	Grimsby Town	1
MF	Richie Bowman	Reading	1
MF	Alan Little	Barnsley	1
FW	Alan Cork	Wimbledon	1
FW	Les Bradd	Stockport County	1
FW	Allan Clarke	Barnsley	2

== See also ==
- PFA Team of the Year (1980s)
- PFA Team of the Year (1990s)
- PFA Team of the Year (2000s)
- PFA Team of the Year (2010s)
- PFA Team of the Year (2020s)
