= PFA Team of the Year =

English football Award

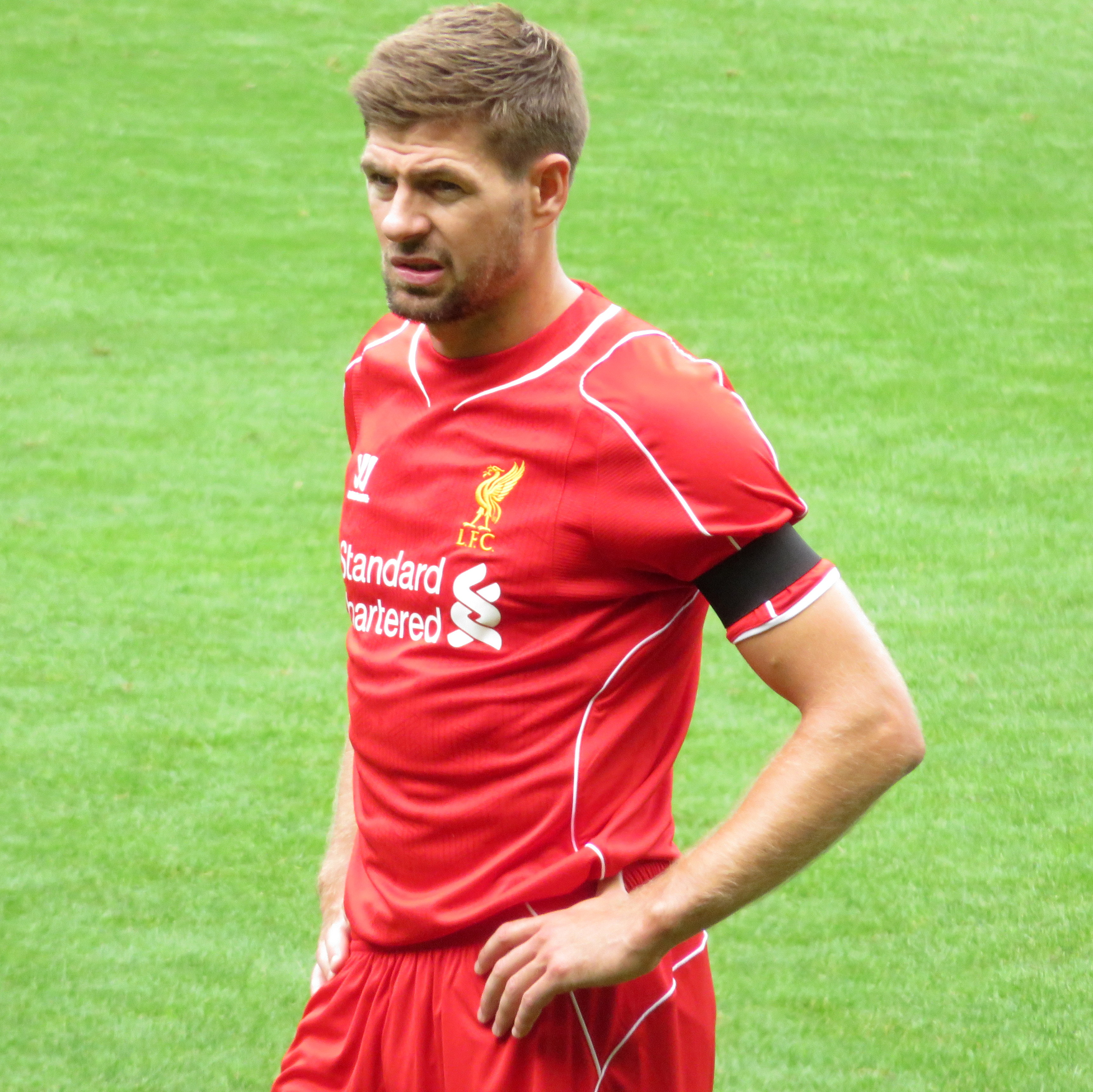
Steven Gerrard appeared in the PFA Premier League Team of the Year eight times.

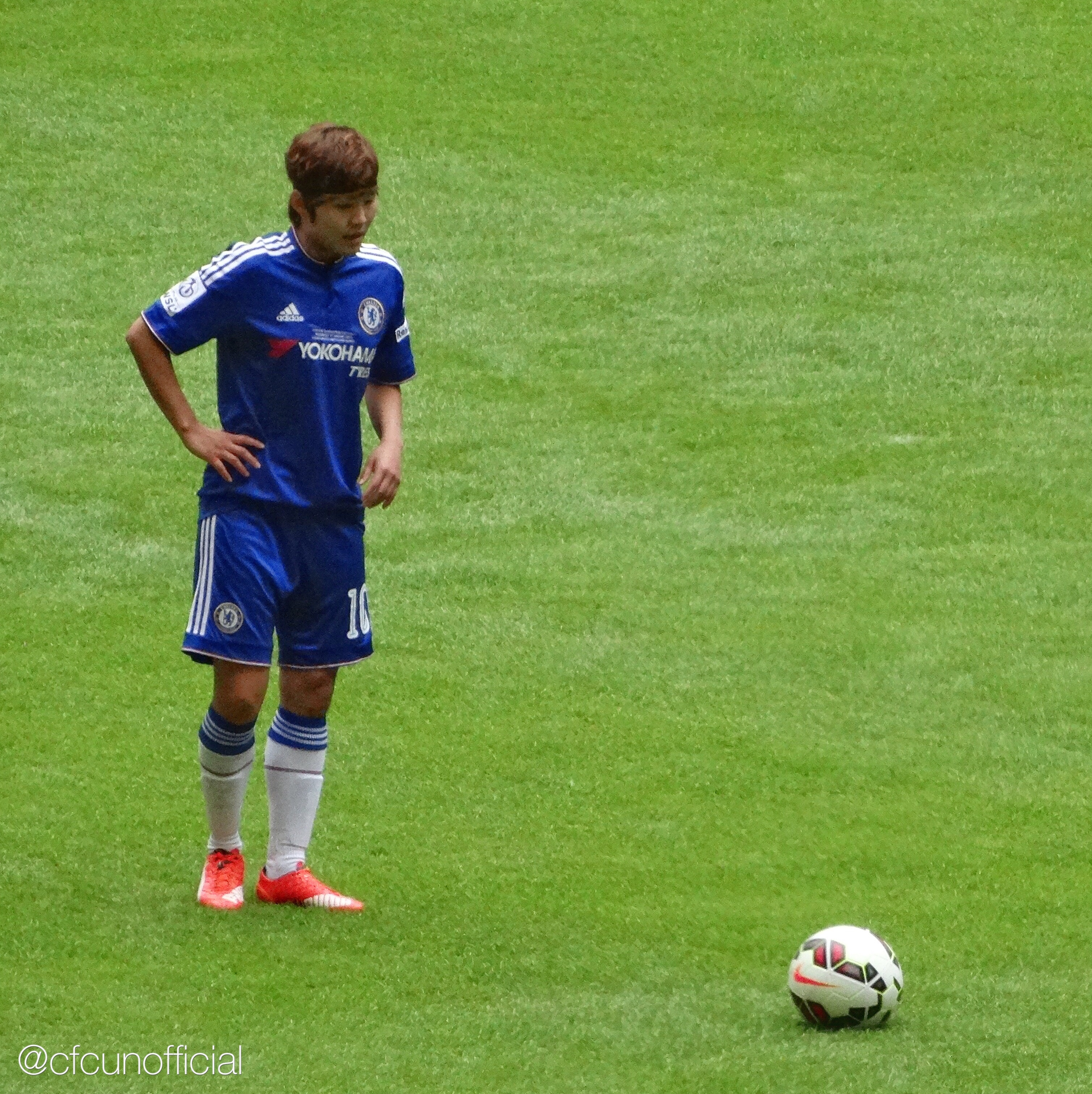
Ji So-yun appeared in a PFA Team of the Year on 5 occasions, which is more than any other women's player.

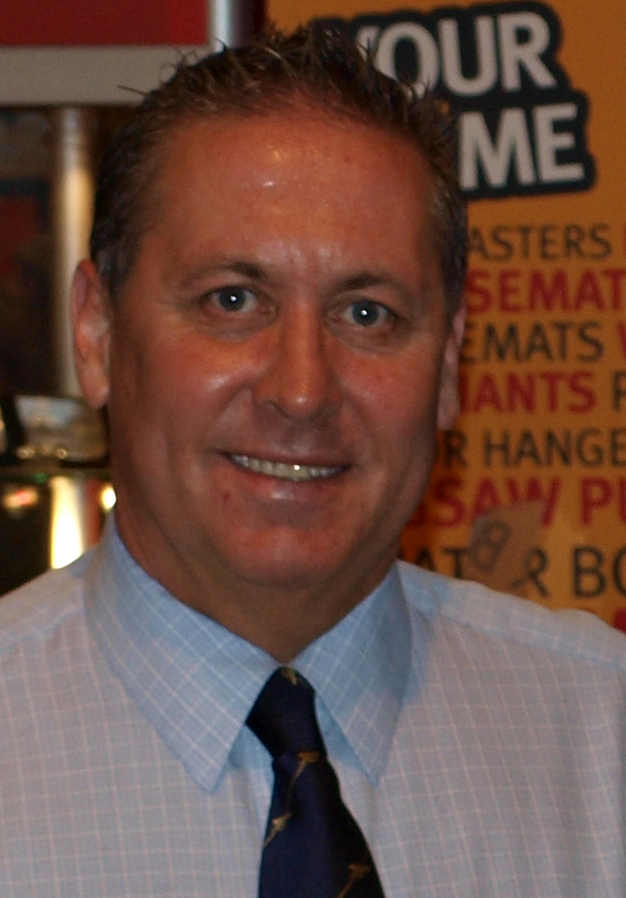
Kenny Sansom appeared in a PFA Team of the Year on 11 occasions, which is more than any other player.

The Professional Footballers' Association Team of the Year (often called the PFA Team of the Year, or simply the Team of the Year) is an annual award given to a set of 55 footballers across the top four tiers of men's English football: the Premier League, the Championship, League One and League Two, as well as the top tier of women's football: the Women's Super League.

The award has been presented to men since the 1973–74 season and women since the 2013–14 season. The shortlist is compiled by the members of the players' trade union, the Professional Footballers' Association (PFA), in January of every year, with the winners then being voted for by the other players in their respective divisions.

The award is regarded by players in the Football League as the highest accolade available to them, due to it being picked by their fellow professionals.

== Most appearances ==
- Kenny Sansom currently holds the most appearances in the PFA Team of the Year over all men's divisions with 11 appearances.
- Peter Shilton currently holds the most appearances in the PFA Team of the Year in the men's top division with 10 appearances.
- Steven Gerrard currently holds the most appearances in the PFA Team of the Year in the Premier League era with eight appearances.
- Ji So-yun currently holds the most wins in the PFA Team of the Year in the Women's Super League (WSL) with five appearances.

== Winners ==
- PFA Team of the Year (2020s)
- PFA Team of the Year (2010s)
- PFA Team of the Year (2000s)
- PFA Team of the Year (1990s)
- PFA Team of the Year (1980s)
- PFA Team of the Year (1970s)
