= Colin Todd =

English football manager and former player

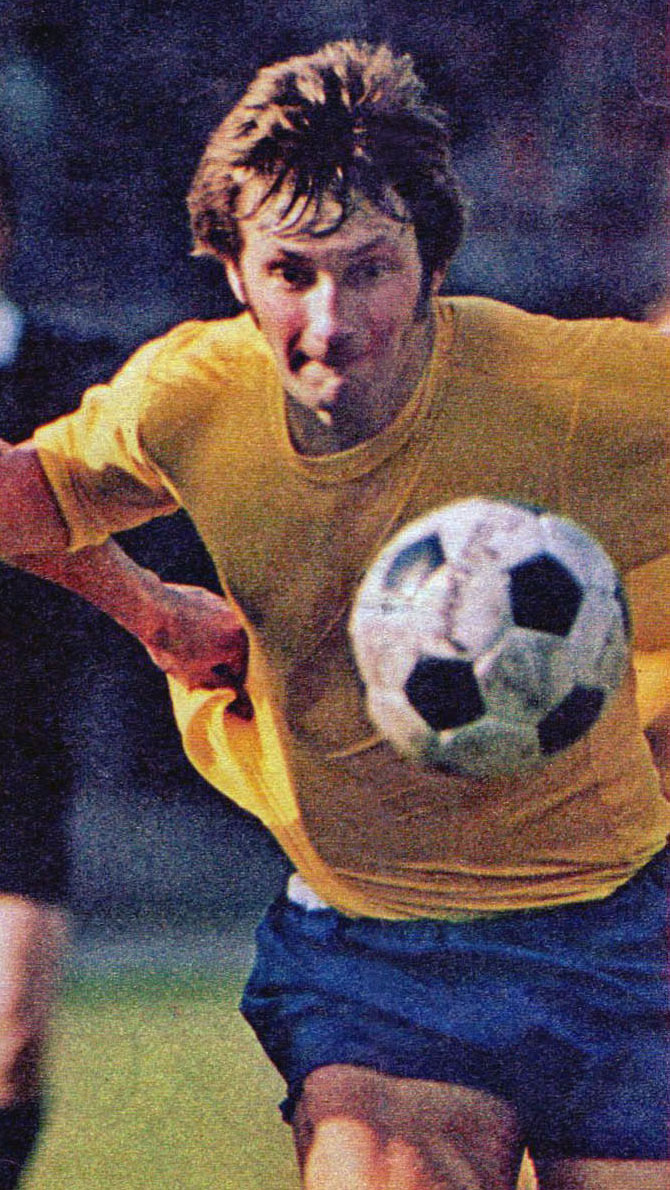
- Todd playing for Derby County in 1973

Personal information
- Full name: Colin Todd
- Date of birth: 12 December 1948 (age 77)
- Place of birth: Chester-le-Street, County Durham, England
- Height: 5 ft 9 in (1.75 m)
- Position: Central defender

Youth career
- 1964–1966: Sunderland

Senior career*
Years	Team	Apps	(Gls)
1966–1971	Sunderland	173	(3)
1967	→ Vancouver Royal Canadians (loan)	12	(1)
1971–1978	Derby County	293	(6)
1978–1979	Everton	32	(1)
1979–1982	Birmingham City	93	(0)
1982–1984	Nottingham Forest	36	(0)
1984	Oxford United	12	(0)
1984	Vancouver Whitecaps	8	(0)
1984	Luton Town	2	(0)
Total		661	(11)

International career
1967	England Youth	3	(0)
1968–1975	England U23	14	(0)
1972–1977	England	27	(0)

Managerial career
- 1990–1991: Middlesbrough
- 1995–1999: Bolton Wanderers
- 2000: Swindon Town
- 2001–2002: Derby County
- 2004–2007: Bradford City
- 2007–2009: Randers
- 2009: Darlington
- 2012–2016: Randers
- 2016: Esbjerg
- * Club domestic league appearances and goals

Colin Todd (born 12 December 1948) is an English football manager and former player. He was most recently the manager of Esbjerg fB. As a player, he made more than 600 appearances in the Football League, playing as a defender for Sunderland, Derby County, Everton, Birmingham City, Nottingham Forest, Oxford United and Luton Town, and also played in the North American Soccer League for the Vancouver Whitecaps. He won two Football League titles with Derby County during the 1970s, and won the PFA Players' Player of the Year award in 1975. He was capped by England on 27 occasions.

He has managed English league clubs Middlesbrough, Bolton Wanderers, Swindon Town, Derby County, Bradford City, Darlington and Danish Superliga side Randers FC. He took Bolton Wanderers to the First Division title in 1997 with 98 points and 100 goals, although he was unable to establish the club in the Premier League.

== Playing career ==
=== Club career ===
The young Todd had opportunities to sign for Newcastle United and Middlesbrough, but chose Sunderland "because of their tradition for youth". He was a member of the youth team coached by Brian Clough in 1965, and played a major part in Sunderland's 1967 victory in the FA Youth Cup. By then Todd was already a first-team regular. He made his debut as substitute for Charlie Hurley in a 1–1 draw away against Chelsea in the First Division on 10 September 1966, and by mid-season had established himself in the starting eleven. He missed only three league games in the next three seasons, at the end of which Sunderland were relegated from the top flight. After 191 appearances and three goals in all competitions for Sunderland, Todd rejoined Clough at Derby County in February 1971.

On joining Derby, he had cost them a British record transfer fee for a defender of £175,000. When linked with the club, Brian Clough remarked "We're not signing Colin Todd, we can't afford him". He then signed him that same day. Clough sent the chairman Sam Longson a telegram informing him of the signing and the size of the fee: £175,000.

Todd formed a defensive partnership with fellow England international Roy McFarland, winning two league titles together. Under Clough, Todd helped Derby win the First Division title in his first full season at the Baseball Ground and collected a second title winner's medal under Clough's successor Dave Mackay in 1975.

Todd won the PFA Players' Player of the Year award in 1975 – the same year that he won his second league title.

He later played for Everton, Birmingham City, Nottingham Forest, and Oxford United, finally retiring from playing in 1984 after a brief spell with Luton Town.

=== International career ===
Todd represented England at youth and under-23 levels. Additionally, he won 27 England caps. His international debut was against Northern Ireland on 23 May 1972, and his last appearance came on 28 May 1977, also against Northern Ireland.

== Managerial career ==
=== Middlesbrough ===
Todd entered management in March 1990 with Middlesbrough, succeeding Bruce Rioch. He had coached the club from the Third Division to First Division in successive seasons but on taking the manager's job, Middlesbrough were struggling in the Second Division and facing the real threat of moving from the Third to First Division and back again in successive seasons. Todd kept the club in the Second Division and they qualified for the play-offs a year later, although they were denied the chance of promotion after losing to eventual winners Notts County in the semi-finals and Todd subsequently resigned.

=== Bolton Wanderers ===
He moved on to Bolton Wanderers in 1992 as assistant to his predecessor at Middlesbrough, Bruce Rioch. After Rioch left to manage Arsenal, having achieved promotion in the 1994–95 season, McFarland moved to Bolton as joint-manager alongside Todd.

Bolton struggled in the Premier League and McFarland was dismissed in early 1996, leaving Todd in sole charge. He was unable to prevent Bolton's relegation but guided them back to the top-flight by winning the First Division in the 1996–97 season, ensuring Bolton's new stadium would host Premier League football. Despite strengthening the squad with new signings, Bolton struggled in the top flight and were relegated again at the end of the season. Todd led the club to the play-off final in 1999 but lost to Watford, and he resigned seven games into the 1999–2000 season following the sale of Per Frandsen to Blackburn Rovers.

=== Swindon Town ===
Todd returned to management with Swindon Town. His spell at Swindon was unsuccessful as poor results meant the club faced a relegation battle when it had been hoped to gain promotion. Todd won only five out of twenty games with the club.

=== Derby County ===
Todd resigned as Swindon manager in November 2000 to return to Derby as assistant manager to Jim Smith. When Smith resigned in October 2001 Todd was promoted to manager but he was dismissed after just three months having failed to improve the struggling club's form.

=== Bradford City ===
Todd joined Bradford City in 2003 as assistant to manager Bryan Robson. When Robson left at the end of the 2003–04 season, Todd was named his successor. It was the fourth time he had been promoted from assistant to manager. He became the longest serving Bradford manager for twenty years, and led the club to several mid-table finishes. After only winning once in ten games, Todd was dismissed in February 2007. Bradford were subsequently relegated to League Two and Todd pointed to the departure of key players and lack of funds for new signings as reasons for Bradford's demise.

=== Randers FC ===
Todd became manager of Danish side Randers FC in the summer of 2007, replacing the former Danish 1992 European champion Lars Olsen who had signed with Odense Boldklub. Todd said that lack of job opportunities in England led to him managing Randers FC in Denmark, saying: "Even though I'm coming up to 59, I still get a buzz. The hardest thing is being out of football. It hits you badly. So I'm enjoying working in Denmark." Todd was due to leave Randers at the end of June 2009, to be replaced by another 1992 European champion former Arsenal player John Jensen. However, in January 2009 Todd and Randers agreed to go separate ways. Jensen then took over as manager.

=== Darlington ===
Todd was announced as the new manager of League Two Darlington on 20 May 2009. He replaced Dave Penney who left the club to join League One side Oldham Athletic as a result of Darlington's administration. Todd brought Dean Windass, a player whom he had at Bradford City, as his assistant player manager. Darlington made a poor start to the 2009–10 season, and having picked up just one point from eight league games, Todd agreed with chairman Raj Singh that he would leave the club if they failed to win their ninth game against Grimsby Town. Darlington drew 1–1 with Grimsby and Todd, as well as Windass, left the club. They had won only one of their 11 games in charge, and none in the league—the club's worst start to a season.

After leaving Darlington, Todd is believed to have applied for the manager's job at English-based Scottish Football League Third Division side Berwick Rangers.

In 2012, Todd was scouting for his former club Birmingham City.

=== Second spells at Randers ===
On 5 June 2012, it was announced that Colin Todd would replace Michael Hemmingsen as caretaker for Randers F.C., until a replacement has been found for the club. On 3 August 2012, it was announced that Todd would continue as a more permanent manager at least until 31 December 2012. On 8 February 2013, UEFA recognised Todd's Coaching Diploma as valid, which meant that Randers could announce him as their permanent manager. On 4 May, Randers FC announced that Todd would leave the club following the 2015–16 Danish Superliga season. Initially, Todd hinted that he would retire from professional football. However, later that same day, he informed Danish press that he would consider another managerial position if he was approached.

=== Esbjerg fB ===
On 8 July, just 40 days after his final game in charge of Randers FC, Todd was announced as the new manager of the Superliga club Esbjerg fB, signing a one-year contract. On 17 July, Todd made his debut as Esbjerg manager in a 4–0 loss away to Brøndby IF. On 8 August, Todd gained his first point in charge of Esbjerg, drawing 2–2 at home with AGF, having led the game 2–0. One week later, Esbjerg lost 2–1 away to AaB, having also just recorded one point in the first five games back in the 2010–11 edition of the tournament. One week later, Todd gained his first win in charge of Esbjerg, defeating OB 3–2 at Blue Water Arena.

Todd was dismissed on 5 December 2016; Esbjerg at the time was in last position in the league.

== Personal life ==
Todd was born into a mining family in Chester-le-Street, County Durham. As a boy he was a fan of Newcastle United and could have signed for them, but he chose Sunderland because he preferred their approach to youth development. His son Andy is an assistant manager, having previously appeared under his father's management for Middlesbrough and Bolton.

== Managerial statistics ==
As of match played on 4 December 2016

Team	Nat	From	To	Record				
Team	Nat	From	To	G	W	D	L	Win %
Middlesbrough	England	March 1990	June 1991	70	28	16	26	40.00
Bolton Wanderers	England	June 1995	January 1996	28	5	7	16	17.86
Bolton Wanderers	England	January 1996	September 1999	183	79	53	51	43.17
Swindon Town	England	May 2000	November 2000	20	5	6	9	25.00
Derby County	England	October 2001	January 2002	17	4	2	11	23.53
Bradford City	England	June 2004	February 2007	139	44	46	49	31.65
Randers FC	Denmark	July 2007	January 2009	57	22	17	18	38.60
Darlington	England	May 2009	September 2009	11	1	2	8	9.09
Randers FC*	Denmark	July 2012	May 2016	177	67	54	56	37.85
Esbjerg fB	Denmark	July 2016	December 2016	21	3	7	11	14.29
Total				722	258	209	255	35.73

* – Todd underwent a bypass operation in February 2014 and therefore missed the first five games of the spring season. His assistant Thomas Thomasberg was in charge in those games resulting in 3 draws and 2 defeats.

== Honours ==
=== As a player ===
Sunderland

- FA Youth Cup runner-up: 1965–66

Derby County

- Football League First Division: 1971–72, 1974–75
- FA Charity Shield: 1975
- Texaco Cup: 1972

Oxford United

- Football League Second Division: 1984–85
- Football League Third Division: 1983–84

Individual

- Rothmans Golden Boots Awards (Substitute): 1973, 1974
- PFA Players' Player of the Year: 1974–75
- World XI: 1975, 1976
- PFA Team of the Year: 1973–74 First Division, 1974–75 First Division, 1975–76 First Division

=== As a manager ===
Middlesbrough

- Full Members' Cup runner-up: 1989–90

Bolton Wanderers

- Football League First Division: 1996–97

Individual

- Football League One Manager of the Month: October 2004
