= PFA Players' Player of the Year =

Annual award

PFA Men's Players' Player of the Year
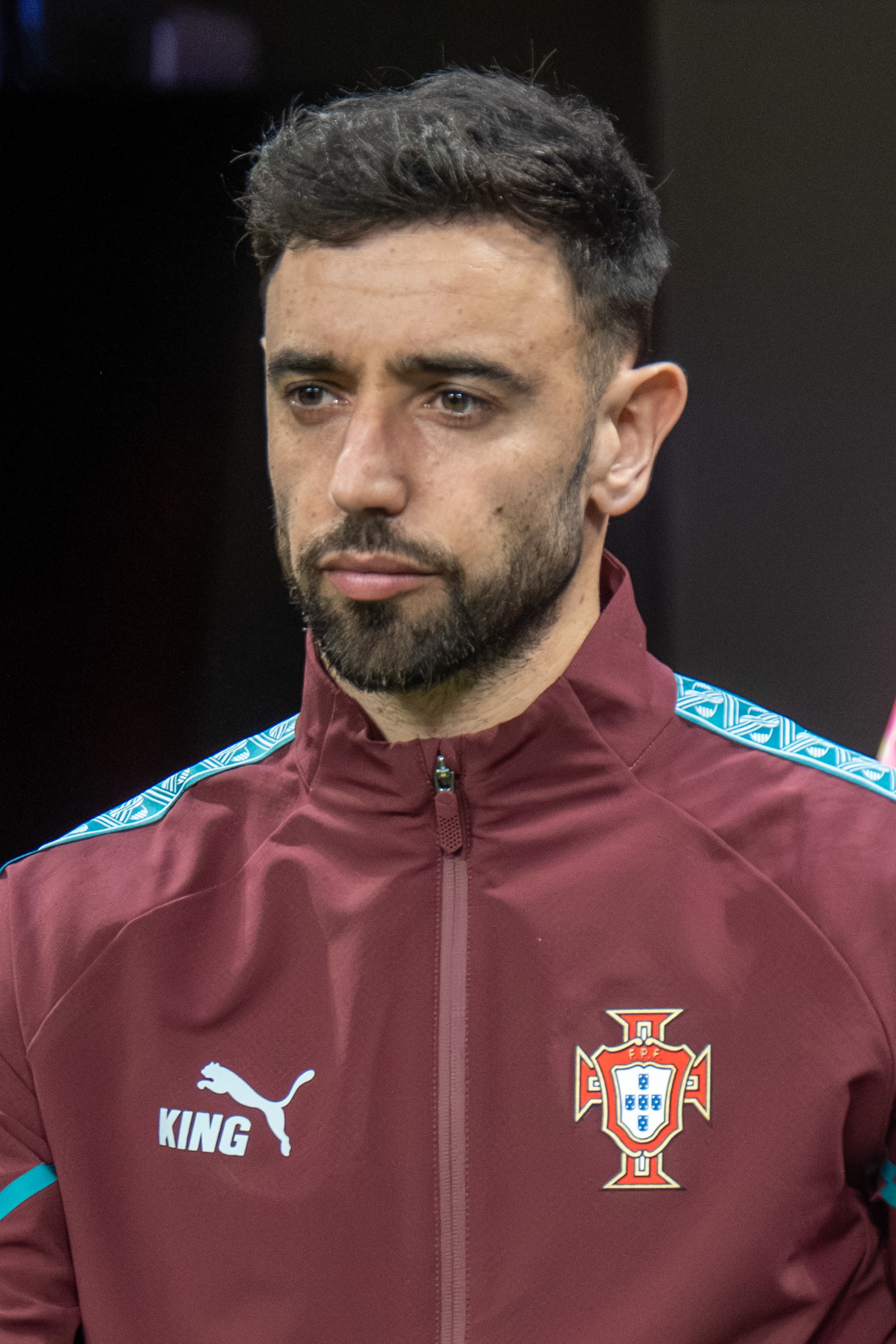
- 2026 winner Bruno Fernandes
- Sport: Association football
- Competition: All levels of English football
- Country: England and Wales
- Presented by: PFA

History
- First award: 1973–74
- Editions: 53
- First winner: Norman Hunter
- Most wins: Mohamed Salah (3)
- Most recent: Bruno Fernandes (2026)
- Website: Official website

The Professional Footballers' Association Men's Players' Player of the Year is an annual award given to the player who is adjudged to have been the best of the year in English football. The award has been presented since the 1973–74 season and the winner is chosen by a vote amongst the members of the players' trade union, the Professional Footballers' Association (PFA). The current holder is Bruno Fernandes of Manchester United.

The first winner of the award was Leeds United defender Norman Hunter. As of 2026, only Mohamed Salah has won the award on three occasions, and only Thierry Henry, Cristiano Ronaldo and Kevin De Bruyne have won the award in consecutive seasons. Of the seven players to have won multiple awards, only Alan Shearer won his two awards playing for different teams. Although there is a separate PFA Young Player of the Year award, young players remain eligible to win the senior award, and on three occasions the same player has won both awards for a season, Andy Gray in 1976–77, Ronaldo in 2006–07 and Gareth Bale in 2012–13. Only three non-European players have won the award: Luis Suárez (Uruguay) in 2013–14, Riyad Mahrez (Algeria) in 2015–16, and Mohamed Salah (Egypt) in 2017–18, 2021–22 and 2024–25.

Every spring, each member of the association votes for two players. A shortlist of nominees is published in April and the winner of the award, along with the winners of the PFA's other annual awards, is announced at a gala event in London. The award is regarded by the players themselves as extremely prestigious, with Teddy Sheringham describing it in 2001 as "the biggest personal award you can get in the game", and John Terry stating in 2005 that he considered it "the ultimate accolade to be voted for by your fellow professionals whom you play against week-in and week-out".

== Winners ==
The award has been presented on 53 occasions as of 2026, with 45 different winners. The women's award has been presented since 2013, with nine different winners. The table also indicates where the winning player also won one or more of the other major "player of the year" awards in English football, namely:

- the Football Writers' Association's Footballer of the Year award (FWA),
- the PFA Fans' Player of the Year award (FPY),
- the PFA Young Player of the Year award (YPY),
- the Premier League Player of the Season award (PPS),
- the Premier League Young Player of the Season award (PYS)
- and the Football Supporters’ Association Player of the Year award (FSA).

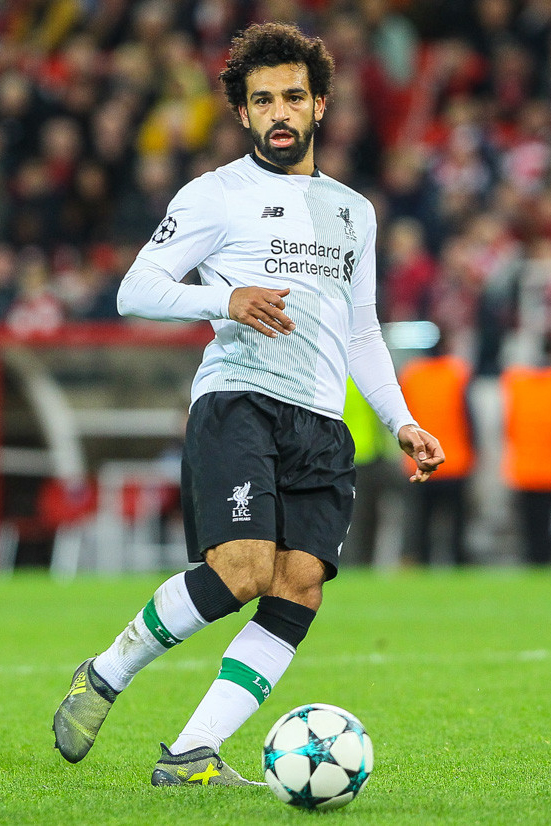
Mohamed Salah has the most Player of the Year awards, with three.

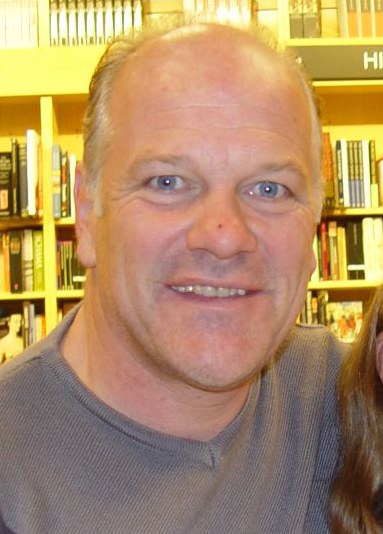
Andy Gray was the first player to win the Player of the Year and Young Player of the Year awards in the same season.

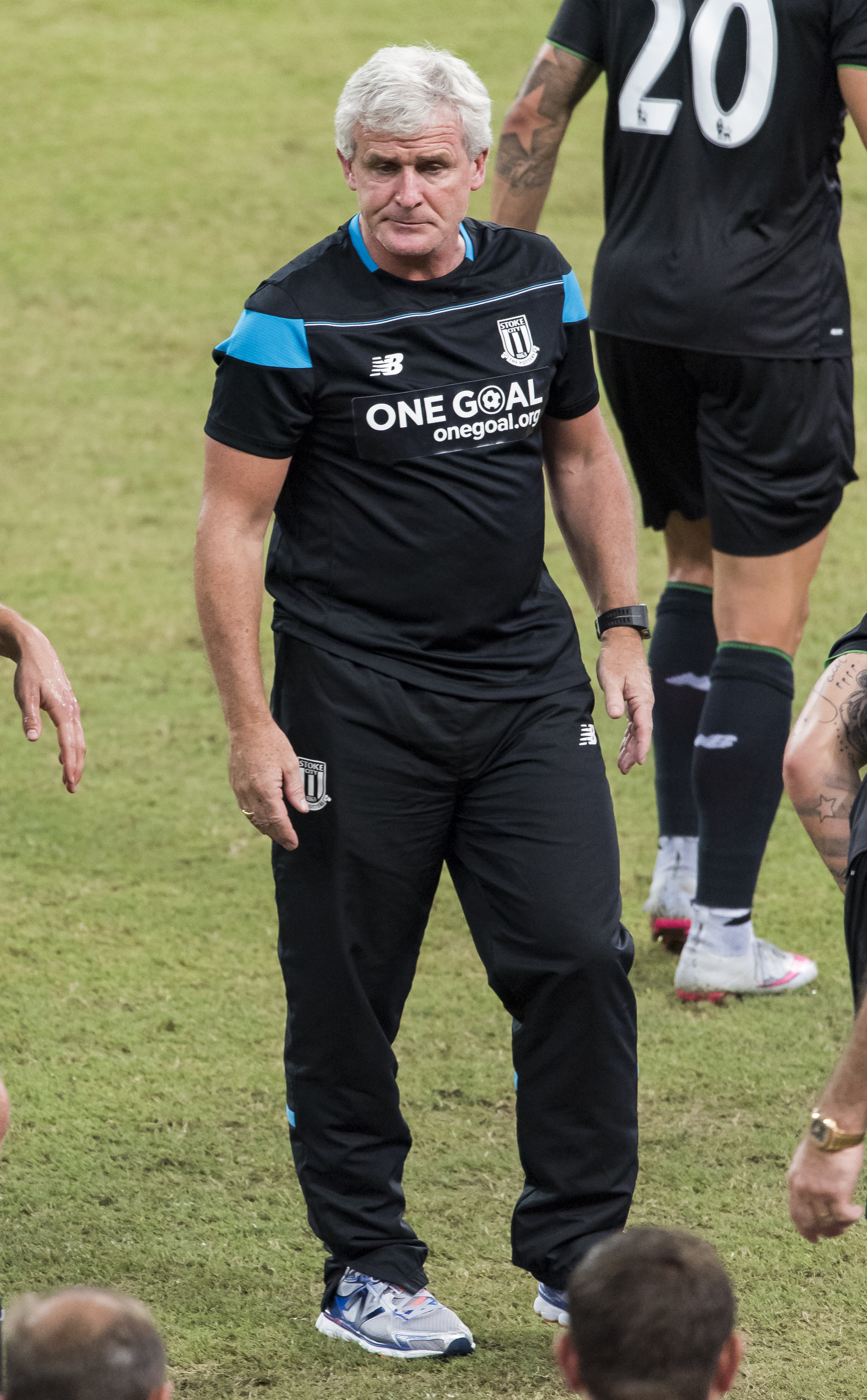
Mark Hughes was the first player to win the Player of the Year award twice.

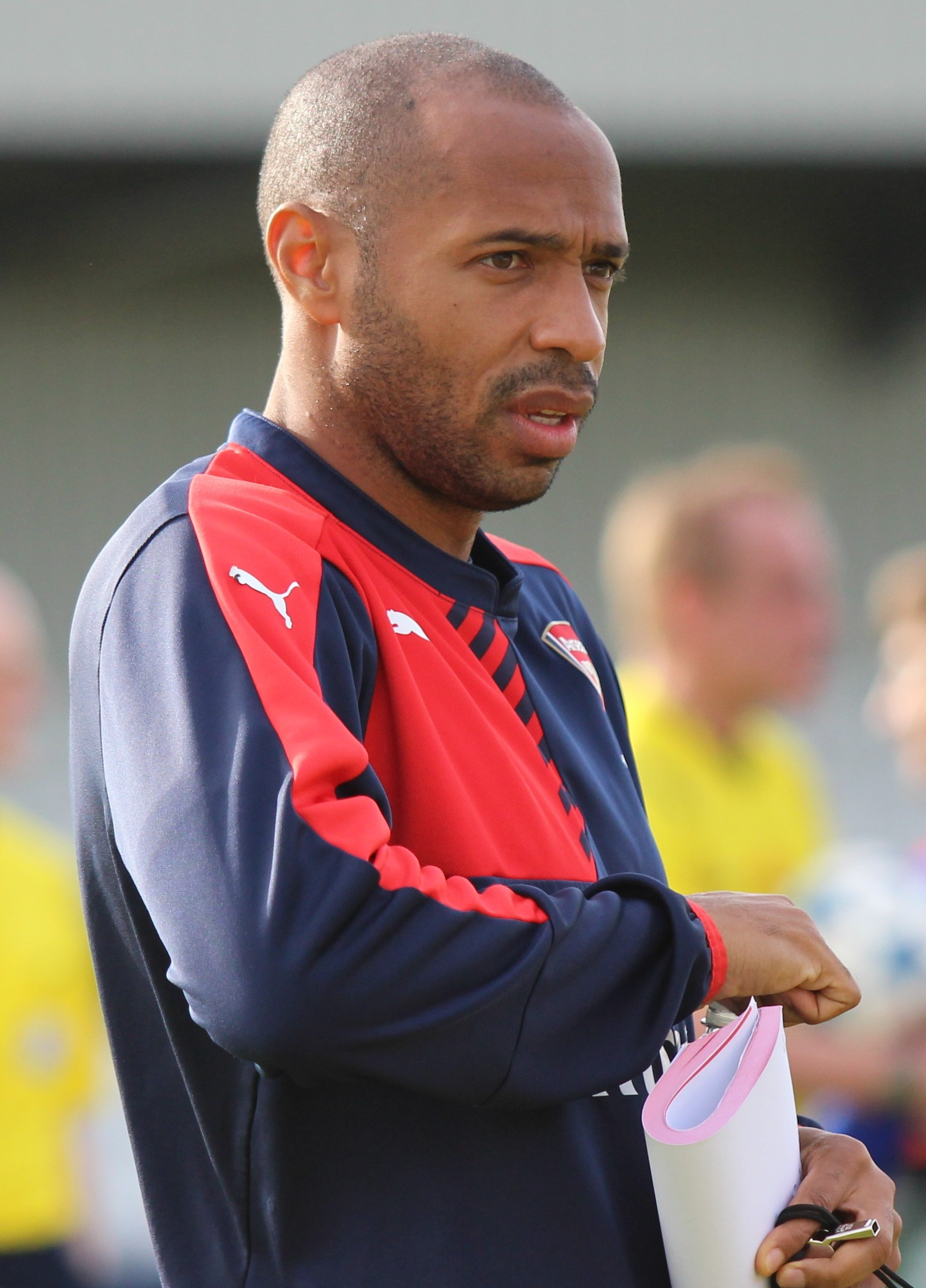
Thierry Henry was the first player to win the award in two consecutive seasons.

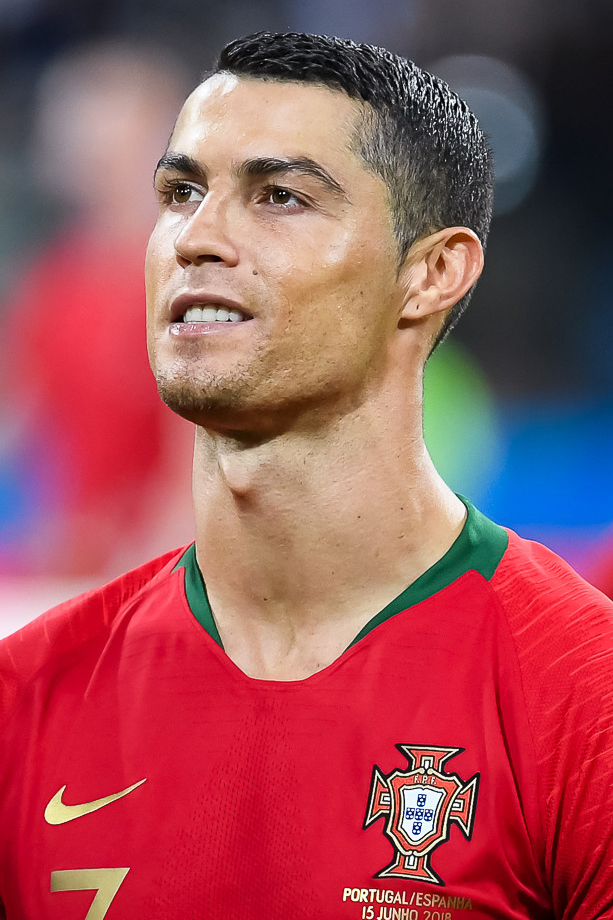
Cristiano Ronaldo was the first player to win all five major awards in the same year.

Year		Player	Club	Also won	Notes
1973–74	(England)	Norman Hunter	Leeds United		
1974–75	(England)	Colin Todd	Derby County		
1975–76	(Northern Ireland)	Pat Jennings	Tottenham Hotspur		
1976–77	(Scotland)	Andy Gray	Aston Villa	YPY	
1977–78	(England)	Peter Shilton	Nottingham Forest		
1978–79	(Republic of Ireland)	Liam Brady	Arsenal		
1979–80	(England)	Terry McDermott	Liverpool	FWA	
1980–81	(Scotland)	John Wark	Ipswich Town		
1981–82	(England)	Kevin Keegan	Southampton		
1982–83	(Scotland)	Kenny Dalglish	Liverpool	FWA	
1983–84	(Wales)	Ian Rush	Liverpool	FWA	
1984–85	(England)	Peter Reid	Everton		
1985–86	(England)	Gary Lineker	Everton	FWA	
1986–87	(England)	Clive Allen	Tottenham Hotspur	FWA	
1987–88	(England)	John Barnes	Liverpool	FWA	
1988–89	(Wales)	Mark Hughes	Manchester United		
1989–90	(England)	David Platt	Aston Villa		
1990–91	(Wales)	Mark Hughes (2)	Manchester United		
1991–92	(England)	Gary Pallister	Manchester United		
1992–93	(Republic of Ireland)	Paul McGrath	Aston Villa		
1993–94	(France)	Eric Cantona	Manchester United		
1994–95	(England)	Alan Shearer	Blackburn Rovers	PPS	
1995–96	(England)	Les Ferdinand	Newcastle United		
1996–97	(England)	Alan Shearer (2)	Newcastle United		
1997–98	(Netherlands)	Dennis Bergkamp	Arsenal	FWA	
1998–99	(France)	David Ginola	Tottenham Hotspur	FWA	
1999–2000	(Republic of Ireland)	Roy Keane	Manchester United	FWA	
2000–01	(England)	Teddy Sheringham	Manchester United	FWA	
2001–02	(Netherlands)	Ruud van Nistelrooy	Manchester United	FPY	
2002–03	(France)	Thierry Henry	Arsenal	FWA, FPY	
2003–04	(France)	Thierry Henry (2)	Arsenal	FWA, FPY, PPS	
2004–05	(England)	John Terry	Chelsea		
2005–06	(England)	Steven Gerrard	Liverpool		
2006–07	(Portugal)	Cristiano Ronaldo	Manchester United	FWA, FPY, YPY, PPS	
2007–08	(Portugal)	Cristiano Ronaldo (2)	Manchester United	FWA, FPY, PPS	
2008–09	(Wales)	Ryan Giggs	Manchester United		
2009–10	(England)	Wayne Rooney	Manchester United	FWA, FPY, PPS	
2010–11	(Wales)	Gareth Bale	Tottenham Hotspur		
2011–12	(Netherlands)	Robin van Persie	Arsenal	FWA, FPY	
2012–13	(Wales)	Gareth Bale (2)	Tottenham Hotspur	FWA, YPY, PPS	
2013–14	(Uruguay)	Luis Suárez	Liverpool	FWA, FPY, PPS, FSA	
2014–15	(Belgium)	Eden Hazard	Chelsea	FWA, PPS	
2015–16	(Algeria)	Riyad Mahrez	Leicester City	FPY	
2016–17	(France)	N'Golo Kanté	Chelsea	FWA, PPS	
2017–18	(Egypt)	Mohamed Salah	Liverpool	FWA, FPY, PPS, FSA	
2018–19	(Netherlands)	Virgil van Dijk	Liverpool	PPS, FSA	
2019–20	(Belgium)	Kevin De Bruyne	Manchester City	PPS	
2020–21	(Belgium)	Kevin De Bruyne (2)	Manchester City		
2021–22	(Egypt)	Mohamed Salah (2)	Liverpool	FWA, FPY	
2022–23	(Norway)	Erling Haaland	Manchester City	FWA, FPY, PPS, PYS	
2023–24	(England)	Phil Foden	Manchester City	FWA, PPS	
2024–25	(Egypt)	Mohamed Salah (3)	Liverpool	FWA, PPS	
2025–26	(Portugal)	Bruno Fernandes	Manchester United	FWA, PPS	

=== By country ===
Winners of the PFA Players' Player of the Year by country
Country	Number of wins	Winning years
England	19	1973–74, 1974–75, 1977–78, 1979–80, 1981–82, 1984–85, 1985–86, 1986–87, 1987–88, 1989–90, 1991–92, 1994–95, 1995–96, 1996–97, 2000–01, 2004–05, 2005–06, 2009–10, 2023–24
Wales	6	1983–84, 1988–89, 1990–91, 2008–09, 2010–11, 2012–13
France	5	1993–94, 1998–99, 2002–03, 2003–04, 2016–17
Netherlands	4	1997–98, 2001–02, 2011–12, 2018–19
Scotland	3	1976–77, 1980–81, 1982–83
Republic of Ireland	3	1978–79, 1992–93, 1999–2000
Egypt	3	2017–18, 2021–22, 2024–25
Belgium	3	2014–15, 2019–20, 2020–21
Portugal	3	2006–07, 2007–08, 2025–26
Northern Ireland	1	1975–76
Uruguay	1	2013–14
Algeria	1	2015–16
Norway	1	2022–23

=== By club ===
Winners of the PFA Players' Player of the Year by club
Club	Number of wins	Winning years
Manchester United	12	1988–89, 1990–91, 1991–92, 1993–94, 1999–2000, 2000–01, 2001–02, 2006–07, 2007–08, 2008–09, 2009–10, 2025-26
Liverpool	10	1979–80, 1982–83, 1983–84, 1987–88, 2005–06, 2013–14, 2017–18, 2018–19, 2021–22, 2024–25
Tottenham Hotspur	5	1975–76, 1986–87, 1998–99, 2010–11, 2012–13
Arsenal	5	1978–79, 1997–98, 2002–03, 2003–04, 2011–12
Manchester City	4	2019–20, 2020–21, 2022–23, 2023–24
Chelsea	3	2004–05, 2014–15, 2016–17
Aston Villa	3	1976–77, 1989–90, 1992–93
Everton	2	1984–85, 1985–86
Newcastle United	2	1995–96, 1996–97
Leeds United	1	1973–74
Derby County	1	1974–75
Nottingham Forest	1	1977–78
Ipswich Town	1	1980–81
Southampton	1	1981–82
Blackburn Rovers	1	1994–95
Leicester City	1	2015–16

== See also ==
- Premier League Player of the Season
- FWA Footballer of the Year
