= PFA Young Player of the Year =

English football award

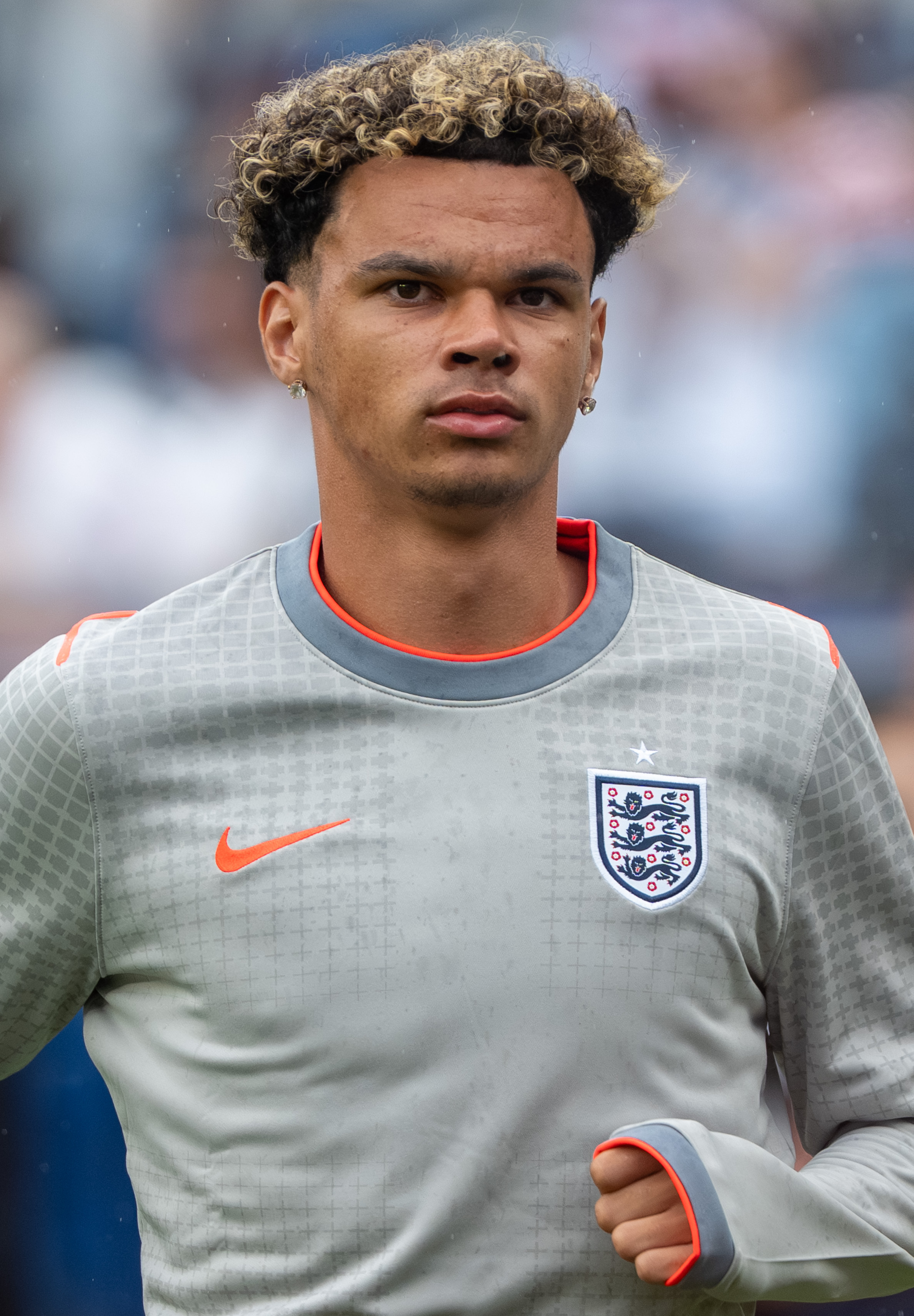
- 2026 winner Nico O'Reilly
- Sport: Association football
- Competition: All levels of English football
- Country: England
- Presented by: PFA

History
- First award: 1973–74
- Editions: 53
- First winner: (England) Kevin Beattie
- Most recent: (England) Nico O'Reilly (2026)
- Website: Official website

The Professional Footballers' Association Young Player of the Year (often called the PFA Young Player of the Year, or simply the Young Player of the Year) is an annual award given to the young player who is adjudged to have been the best of the season in English football. As of 2021, players must have been aged 21 or under as of 1 July immediately preceding the start of the season; in the past the age limit has been 23, which led to criticism in the media over whether a player who was 24 years old at the end of the season could really be considered "young" in footballing terms. The award has been presented since the 1973–74 season and the winner is chosen by a vote amongst the members of the players' trade union, the Professional Footballers' Association (PFA). The first winner of the award was Ipswich Town defender Kevin Beattie. The current holder is Manchester City defender Nico O'Reilly, who won the award on 25 August 2026.

Although the award is open to players at all levels, all winners to date have played in the highest division of the English football league system. In 2018, Ryan Sessegnon of Fulham became the first player from outside the top division of English football to be nominated for the award. As of 2026, only Ryan Giggs, Robbie Fowler, Wayne Rooney, Dele Alli and Phil Foden have won the award on more than one occasion. Only seven players from outside the United Kingdom have won the trophy, compared with 20 winners of the main PFA Players' Player of the Year award. Although they have their own dedicated award, players aged 21 or under at the start of the season remain eligible to win the Players' Player of the Year award, and on three occasions the same player has won both awards for a season.

A shortlist of nominees is published in April and the winner of the award, along with the winners of the PFA's other annual awards, is announced at a gala event in London. The players themselves consider the award to be highly prestigious, because the winner is chosen by his fellow professionals.

== Winners ==
The award has been presented on 53 occasions as of 2026, to 47 players. The table also indicates where the winning player also won one or more of the other major "player of the year" awards in English football, namely the PFA Players' Player of the Year award (PPY), the Football Writers' Association's Footballer of the Year award (FWA), the Premier League Player of the Season award (PPS), the Premier League Young Player of the Season award (PYPS), and the PFA Fans' Player of the Year award (FPY).

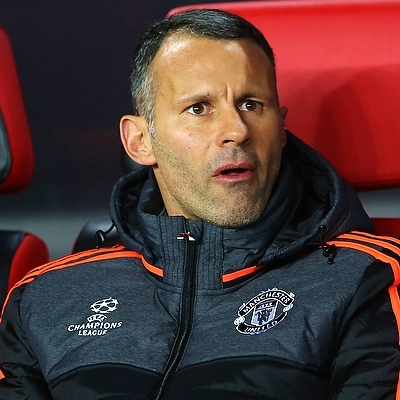
Ryan Giggs was the first player to win the award twice.

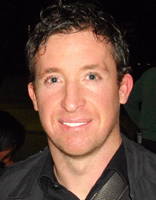
Robbie Fowler was the second two-time winner.

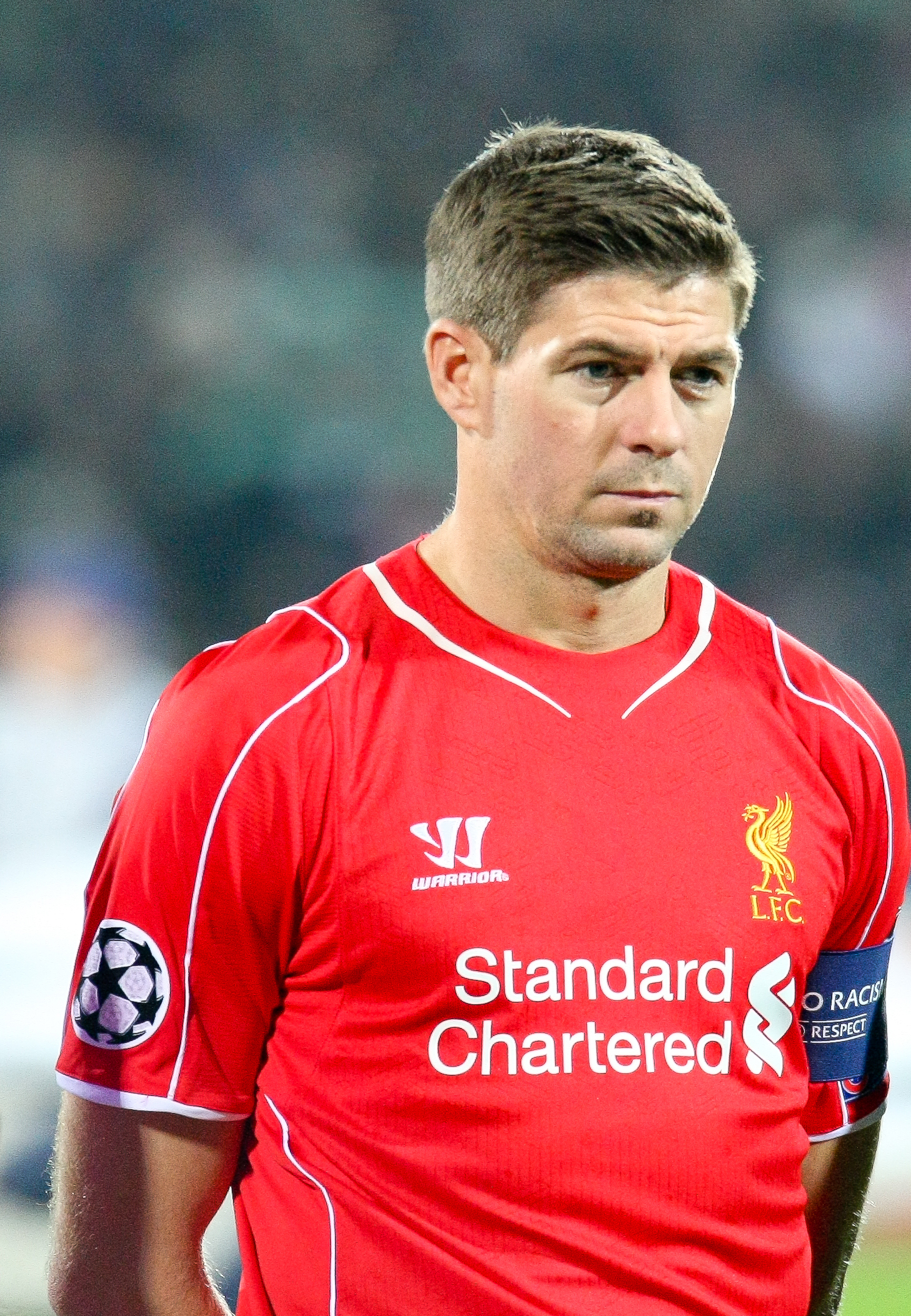
Steven Gerrard was the first player to win the Fans' Player of the Year award in the same season

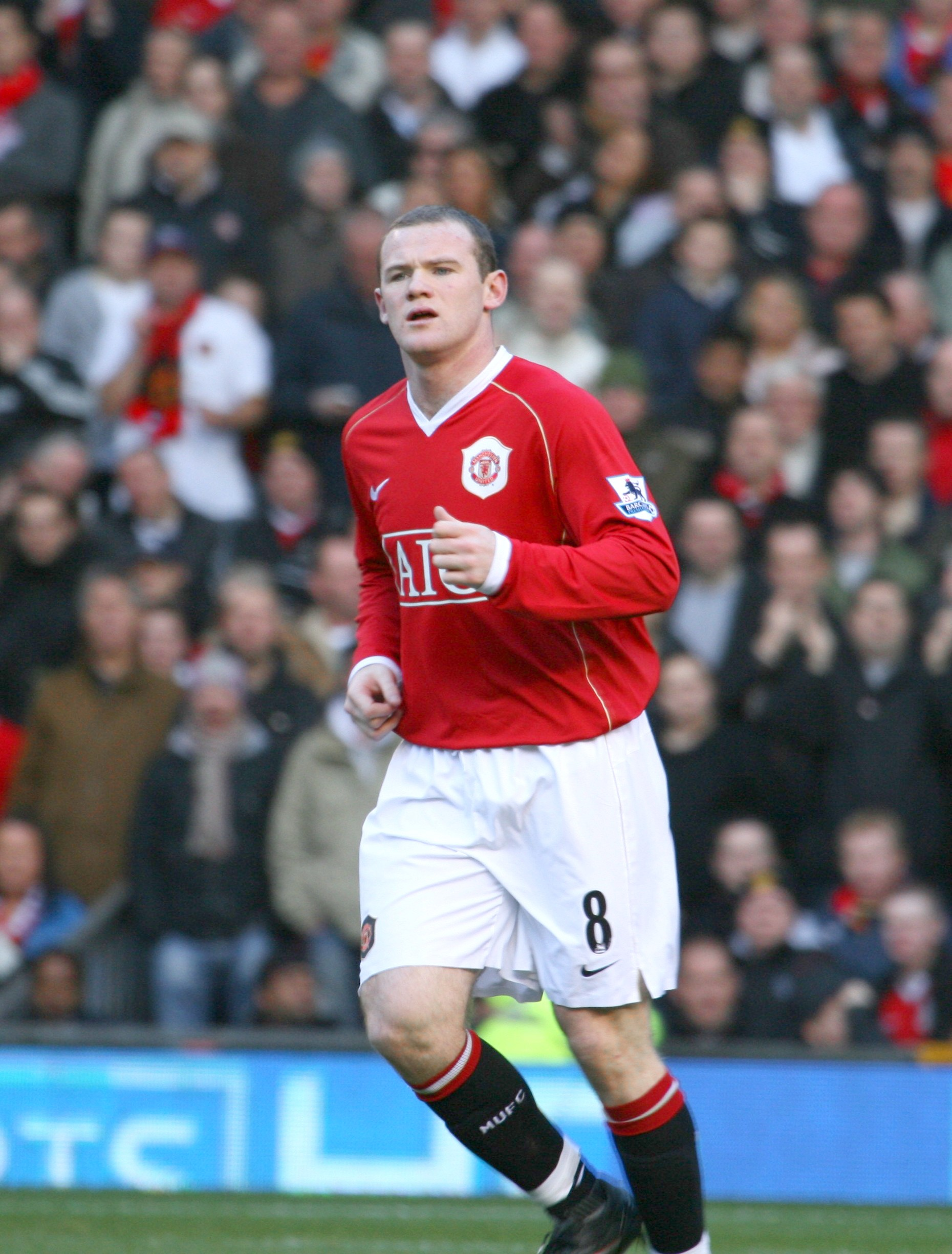
Wayne Rooney was the third player to win the award in two consecutive seasons.

Winners of the PFA Young Player of the Year
Year	Nat.	Player	Club	Also won	Notes
1973–74	(England)	Kevin Beattie	Ipswich Town		
1974–75	(England)	Mervyn Day	West Ham United		
1975–76	(England)	Peter Barnes	Manchester City		
1976–77	(Scotland)	Andy Gray	Aston Villa	PPY	
1977–78	(England)	Tony Woodcock	Nottingham Forest		
1978–79	(England)	Cyrille Regis	West Bromwich Albion		
1979–80	(England)	Glenn Hoddle	Tottenham Hotspur		
1980–81	(England)	Gary Shaw	Aston Villa		
1981–82	(England)	Steve Moran	Southampton		
1982–83	(Wales)	Ian Rush	Liverpool		
1983–84	(England)	Paul Walsh	Luton Town		
1984–85	(Wales)	Mark Hughes	Manchester United		
1985–86	(England)	Tony Cottee	West Ham United		
1986–87	(England)	Tony Adams	Arsenal		
1987–88	(England)	Paul Gascoigne	Newcastle United		
1988–89	(England)	Paul Merson	Arsenal		
1989–90	(England)	Matthew Le Tissier	Southampton		
1990–91	(England)	Lee Sharpe	Manchester United		
1991–92	(Wales)	Ryan Giggs	Manchester United		
1992–93	(Wales)	Ryan Giggs (2)	Manchester United		
1993–94	(England)	Andy Cole	Newcastle United		
1994–95	(England)	Robbie Fowler	Liverpool		
1995–96	(England)	Robbie Fowler (2)	Liverpool		
1996–97	(England)	David Beckham	Manchester United		
1997–98	(England)	Michael Owen	Liverpool	PPS	
1998–99	(France)	Nicolas Anelka	Arsenal		
1999–2000	(Australia)	Harry Kewell	Leeds United		
2000–01	(England)	Steven Gerrard	Liverpool	FPY	
2001–02	(Wales)	Craig Bellamy	Newcastle United		
2002–03	(England)	Jermaine Jenas	Newcastle United		
2003–04	(England)	Scott Parker	Charlton Athletic; Chelsea		
2004–05	(England)	Wayne Rooney	Manchester United		
2005–06	(England)	Wayne Rooney (2)	Manchester United	FPY	
2006–07	(Portugal)	Cristiano Ronaldo	Manchester United	PPY, FWA, FPY, PPS	
2007–08	(Spain)	Cesc Fàbregas	Arsenal		
2008–09	(England)	Ashley Young	Aston Villa		
2009–10	(England)	James Milner	Aston Villa		
2010–11	(England)	Jack Wilshere	Arsenal		
2011–12	(England)	Kyle Walker	Tottenham Hotspur		
2012–13	(Wales)	Gareth Bale	Tottenham Hotspur	PPY, FWA, PPS	
2013–14	(Belgium)	Eden Hazard	Chelsea		
2014–15	(England)	Harry Kane	Tottenham Hotspur		
2015–16	(England)	Dele Alli	Tottenham Hotspur		
2016–17	(England)	Dele Alli (2)	Tottenham Hotspur		
2017–18	(Germany)	Leroy Sané	Manchester City		
2018–19	(England)	Raheem Sterling	Manchester City	FWA	
2019–20	(England)	Trent Alexander-Arnold	Liverpool	PYPS	
2020–21	(England)	Phil Foden	Manchester City	PYPS	
2021–22	(England)	Phil Foden (2)	Manchester City	PYPS	
2022–23	(England)	Bukayo Saka	Arsenal		
2023–24	(England)	Cole Palmer	Chelsea	PYPS	
2024–25	(England)	Morgan Rogers	Aston Villa		
2025–26	(England)	Nico O'Reilly	Manchester City		

== Breakdown of winners ==
=== By country ===
Winners of the PFA Young Player of the Year by country
Country	Number of wins	Winning years
England	40	1973–74, 1974–75, 1975–76, 1977–78, 1978–79, 1979–80, 1980–81, 1981–82, 1983–84, 1985–86, 1986–87, 1987–88, 1988–89, 1989–90, 1990–91, 1993–94, 1994–95, 1995–96, 1996–97, 1997–98, 2000–01, 2002–03, 2003–04, 2004–05, 2005–06, 2008–09, 2009–10, 2010–11, 2011–12, 2014–15, 2015–16, 2016–17, 2018–19, 2019–20, 2020–21, 2021–22, 2022–23, 2023–24, 2024–25, 2025–26
Wales	6	1982–83, 1984–85, 1991–92, 1992–93, 2001–02, 2012–13
Scotland	1	1976–77
France	1	1998–99
Australia	1	1999–2000
Portugal	1	2006–07
Spain	1	2007–08
Belgium	1	2013–14
Germany	1	2017–18

=== By club ===
Winners of the PFA Young Player of the Year by club
Club	Number of wins	Winning years
Manchester United	8	1984–85, 1990–91, 1991–92, 1992–93, 1996–97, 2004–05, 2005–06, 2006–07
Tottenham Hotspur	6	1979–80, 2011–12, 2012–13, 2014–15, 2015–16, 2016–17
Liverpool	6	1982–83, 1994–95, 1995–96, 1997–98, 2000–01, 2019–20
Arsenal	6	1986–87, 1988–89, 1998–99, 2007–08, 2010–11, 2022–23
Manchester City	6	1975–76, 2017–18, 2018–19, 2020–21, 2021–22, 2025–26
Aston Villa	5	1976–77, 1980–81, 2008–09, 2009–10, 2024–25
Newcastle United	4	1987–88, 1993–94, 2001–02, 2002–03
Chelsea	3	2003–04, 2013–14, 2023–24
West Ham United	2	1974–75, 1985–86
Southampton	2	1981–82, 1989–90
Ipswich Town	1	1973–74
Nottingham Forest	1	1977–78
West Bromwich Albion	1	1978–79
Luton Town	1	1983–84
Leeds United	1	1999–2000
Charlton Athletic	1	2003–04
