= Peter Grotier =

English footballer (born 1950)

Personal information
- Full name: Peter David Grotier
- Date of birth: 18 October 1950 (age 76)
- Place of birth: Stratford, England
- Height: 5 ft 11 in (1.80 m)
- Position: Goalkeeper

Youth career
- Clapton
- 1966–1969: West Ham United

Senior career*
| Years | Team | Apps | (Gls) |
| 1969–1974 | West Ham United | 50 | (0) |
| 1973 | → Cardiff City (loan) | 2 | (0) |
| 1974–1979 | Lincoln City (Note: Barry Hugman's Footballers states a transfer date of August 1974 with only one set of statistics.) | 233 | (0) |
| 1979–1982 | Cardiff City | 38 | (0) |
| 1982–1986 | Grimsby Town | 10 | (0) |
| Total | | 333 | (0) |

Managerial career
- 1985: Grimsby Town (caretaker)
- * Club domestic league appearances and goals

Peter David Grotier (born 18 October 1950) is an English former professional footballer who played as a goalkeeper in the Football League. In a senior career that started in 1969, he played for West Ham United, Cardiff City, Lincoln City and Grimsby Town, where he later became a coach and, briefly, caretaker manager.

== Career ==
Born in Stratford, Grotier started playing as a goalkeeper at primary school but his early career was curtailed once he moved on to West Ham Tech (presumably South West Ham Technical School), with the presence of the West Ham Schools goalkeeper restricting him to the role of understudy.

He was spotted by Clapton and played in various Sunday leagues in the local area, before being approached by West Ham United chief scout Wally St Pier. After playing a game for the Hammers in the South East Counties League early in the 1966–67 season, he signed forms for a year-long apprenticeship on the day of his 16th birthday. After signing professional forms a year later, he was part of the West Ham A team which, as well as winning trophies in the Metropolitan League, won the Southern Junior Floodlit Cup in 1967 and again in 1969, when they also won the South East Counties League Cup.

Grotier made his first team debut for West Ham on 19 April 1969, a First Division encounter against Tottenham Hotspur. The game was the culmination of an eight-day period in which he also played for the youth team and the 'A' team, as well as two reserve games.

On 22 September 1970 Grotier played in an exhibition match in New York between West Ham and Santos of Brazil where he faced the legendary Brazilian striker, Pele.

He played for the club until 1974, mostly as understudy to Bobby Ferguson. He went loan to Cardiff City in 1973, and then spent a month at Lincoln City at the start of the 1974–75 season. West Ham were asking for at least £20,000 for his transfer and his stay at Lincoln was only made permanent after fans raised money for the fee.

Grotier made a total of 263 League and cup appearances for Lincoln, including a run of 134 consecutive appearances, and was an ever-present during the 1975–76 season. His first two seasons at the club earned him spots in the PFA Division Four Team of the Year in both seasons.

He signed for Cardiff City for £25,000 in 1979, but made only 38 League appearances for the Welsh side before moving on to Grimsby Town in 1982. He later became reserve-team coach at the club, and had a spell as caretaker manager in 1985. He made an appearance for the Mariners in an FA Cup game against Watford in 1986, at the age of 36.

== Other appearances ==
Grotier appeared on BBC TV The Repair Shop (series 12, episode 9, 2023) asking for his programme from the West Ham vs Santos match, autographed by Pele, to be repaired.

== Honours ==
Grimsby Town

- Football League Group Cup: 1981–82
