= 1973–74 in English football =

Football in England
- Season: 1973–74

Men's football
- First Division: Leeds United
- Second Division: Middlesbrough
- Third Division: Oldham Athletic
- Fourth Division: Peterborough United
- FA Cup: Liverpool
- League Cup: Wolverhampton Wanderers
- Charity Shield: Burnley

The 1973–74 season was the 94th season of competitive football in England. Leeds United became league champions for the second time, finishing five points ahead of runners-up Liverpool in the First Division. Middlesbrough, Oldham Athletic and Peterborough United won the Second, Third and Fourth Divisions, respectively. Liverpool won their second FA Cup, beating Newcastle United in the final, while the League Cup final saw Wolverhampton Wanderers defeat Manchester City. In European club football, Tottenham Hotspur reached the UEFA Cup final but lost over two legs to Feyenoord.

== Honours ==
Competition	Winner	Runner-up
First Division	Leeds United (2)	Liverpool
Second Division	Middlesbrough	Luton Town
Third Division	Oldham Athletic	Bristol Rovers
Fourth Division	Peterborough United	Gillingham
FA Cup	Liverpool (2)	Newcastle United
League Cup	Wolverhampton Wanderers (1)	Manchester City
Charity Shield	Burnley	Manchester City
Home Championship	Shared by England and Scotland	

Notes = Number in brackets is the times that club has won that honour. * indicates new record for competition

== Football League ==
=== First Division ===
Don Revie marked his last season as Leeds United's manager by guiding them to the league championship, before taking over from Sir Alf Ramsey as the England national team manager, with England having failed to qualify for the 1974 World Cup. Revie's Leeds side beat Liverpool to the title by five points to win it for the second time in their history. Despite the sensational dismissal of manager Brian Clough only 18 months after he won the First Division with the club, Derby County regrouped well under new manager Dave Mackay to finish third and qualify for the UEFA Cup, along with Ipswich Town and Stoke City. Newly promoted Burnley finished in sixth place.

Manchester United were relegated from the First Division just six years after winning the European Cup at the end of a season which had seen goalkeeper Alex Stepney as joint top scorer with two goals at Christmas. Manchester United's 36-year stay at the top ended after their penultimate game of the season, a 1–0 home defeat against Manchester City; former Manchester United striker Denis Law scored Manchester City's winning goal. Despite this, the board kept faith in manager Tommy Docherty as the man to regain the club's top flight place.

Joining Manchester United in the Second Division were Norwich City and Southampton. This was the first season in which the League introduced three relegation places from the top division.

Pos	Team	Pld	W	D	L	GF	GA	GAv	Pts	Qualification or relegation
1	Leeds United (C)	42	24	14	4	66	31	2.129	62	Qualification for the European Cup first round
2	Liverpool	42	22	13	7	52	31	1.677	57	Qualification for the European Cup Winners' Cup first round (Note: Liverpool qualified for the European Cup Winners' Cup as the 1973-74 FA Cup winners.)
3	Derby County	42	17	14	11	52	42	1.238	48	Qualification for the UEFA Cup first round
4	Ipswich Town	42	18	11	13	67	58	1.155	47	Qualification for the UEFA Cup first round
5	Stoke City	42	15	16	11	54	42	1.286	46	Qualification for the UEFA Cup first round
6	Burnley	42	16	14	12	56	53	1.057	46	
7	Everton	42	16	12	14	50	48	1.042	44	
8	Queens Park Rangers	42	13	17	12	56	52	1.077	43	
9	Leicester City	42	13	16	13	51	41	1.244	42	
10	Arsenal	42	14	14	14	49	51	0.961	42	
11	Tottenham Hotspur	42	14	14	14	45	50	0.900	42	
12	Wolverhampton Wanderers	42	13	15	14	49	49	1.000	41	Qualification for the UEFA Cup first round (Note: Wolverhampton Wanderers qualified for the UEFA Cup as the 1973-74 Football League Cup winners.)
13	Sheffield United	42	14	12	16	44	49	0.898	40	
14	Manchester City	42	14	12	16	39	46	0.848	40	
15	Newcastle United	42	13	12	17	49	48	1.021	38	
16	Coventry City	42	14	10	18	43	54	0.796	38	
17	Chelsea	42	12	13	17	56	60	0.933	37	
18	West Ham United	42	11	15	16	55	60	0.917	37	
19	Birmingham City	42	12	13	17	52	64	0.813	37	
20	Southampton (R)	42	11	14	17	47	68	0.691	36	Relegation to the Second Division
21	Manchester United (R)	42	10	12	20	38	48	0.792	32	Relegation to the Second Division
22	Norwich City (R)	42	7	15	20	37	62	0.597	29	Relegation to the Second Division

Source: World Football
Rules for classification: 1) Points; 2) Goal average; 3) Goals scored
(C) Champions; (R) Relegated

=== Second Division ===
Former Leeds United player Jack Charlton managed Middlesbrough to the Second Division title and a place in the First Division. Second in the table were Luton Town, who finished 15 points behind the champions. Third-placed Carlisle United, managed by Alan Ashman, gained a place in the First Division for the first, and so far only, time in their history, completing a rapid rise from the Fourth Division to the First Division. Preston North End and Swindon Town were relegated along with Crystal Palace, who suffered a second successive relegation.

Pos	Team	Pld	W	D	L	GF	GA	GAv	Pts	Qualification or relegation
1	Middlesbrough (C, P)	42	27	11	4	77	30	2.567	65	Promotion to the First Division
2	Luton Town (P)	42	19	12	11	64	51	1.255	50	Promotion to the First Division
3	Carlisle United (P)	42	20	9	13	61	48	1.271	49	Promotion to the First Division
4	Orient	42	15	18	9	55	42	1.310	48	
5	Blackpool	42	17	13	12	57	40	1.425	47	
6	Sunderland	42	19	9	14	58	44	1.318	47	
7	Nottingham Forest	42	15	15	12	57	43	1.326	45	
8	West Bromwich Albion	42	14	16	12	48	45	1.067	44	
9	Hull City	42	13	17	12	46	47	0.979	43	
10	Notts County	42	15	13	14	55	60	0.917	43	
11	Bolton Wanderers	42	15	12	15	44	40	1.100	42	
12	Millwall	42	14	14	14	51	51	1.000	42	
13	Fulham	42	16	10	16	39	43	0.907	42	
14	Aston Villa	42	13	15	14	48	45	1.067	41	
15	Portsmouth	42	14	12	16	45	62	0.726	40	
16	Bristol City	42	14	10	18	47	54	0.870	38	
17	Cardiff City	42	10	16	16	49	62	0.790	36	Qualification for the Cup Winners' Cup first round
18	Oxford United	42	10	16	16	35	46	0.761	36	
19	Sheffield Wednesday	42	12	11	19	51	63	0.810	35	
20	Crystal Palace (R)	42	11	12	19	43	56	0.768	34	Relegation to the Third Division
21	Preston North End (R)	42	9	14	19	40	62	0.645	31	Relegation to the Third Division
22	Swindon Town (R)	42	7	11	24	36	72	0.500	25	Relegation to the Third Division

Rules for classification: 1) Points; 2) Goal average; 3) Goals scored
(C) Champions; (P) Promoted; (R) Relegated

=== Third Division ===
Promotion was secured by champions Oldham Athletic, Bristol Rovers and York City, which at the time represented York's highest ever League finish. Cambridge United, Shrewsbury Town, Southport and Rochdale were all relegated.

Pos	Team	Pld	W	D	L	GF	GA	GAv	Pts	Promotion or relegation
1	Oldham Athletic (C, P)	46	25	12	9	83	47	1.766	62	Promotion to the Second Division
2	Bristol Rovers (P)	46	22	17	7	65	33	1.970	61	Promotion to the Second Division
3	York City (P)	46	21	19	6	67	38	1.763	61	Promotion to the Second Division
4	Wrexham	46	22	12	12	63	43	1.465	56	
5	Chesterfield	46	21	14	11	55	42	1.310	56	
6	Grimsby Town	46	18	15	13	67	50	1.340	51	
7	Watford	46	19	12	15	64	56	1.143	50	
8	Aldershot	46	19	11	16	65	52	1.250	49	
9	Halifax Town	46	14	21	11	48	51	0.941	49	
10	Huddersfield Town	46	17	13	16	56	55	1.018	47	
11	Bournemouth	46	16	15	15	54	58	0.931	47	
12	Southend United	46	16	14	16	62	62	1.000	46	
13	Blackburn Rovers	46	18	10	18	62	64	0.969	46	
14	Charlton Athletic	46	19	8	19	66	73	0.904	46	
15	Walsall	46	16	13	17	57	48	1.188	45	
16	Tranmere Rovers	46	15	15	16	50	44	1.136	45	
17	Plymouth Argyle	46	17	10	19	59	54	1.093	44	
18	Hereford United	46	14	15	17	53	57	0.930	43	
19	Brighton & Hove Albion	46	16	11	19	52	58	0.897	43	
20	Port Vale	46	14	14	18	52	58	0.897	42	
21	Cambridge United (R)	46	13	9	24	48	81	0.593	35	Relegation to the Fourth Division
22	Shrewsbury Town (R)	46	10	11	25	41	62	0.661	31	Relegation to the Fourth Division
23	Southport (R)	46	6	16	24	35	82	0.427	28	Relegation to the Fourth Division
24	Rochdale (R)	46	2	17	27	38	94	0.404	21	Relegation to the Fourth Division

Source: rsssf.com
(C) Champions; (P) Promoted; (R) Relegated

=== Fourth Division ===
Peterborough United won Division Four and were promoted along with Gillingham, Colchester United and Bury. The league's re-election system voted in favour of the bottom four league clubs and there were no departures from or arrivals into the league in 1974.

Pos	Team	Pld	W	D	L	GF	GA	GAv	Pts	Promotion or relegation
1	Peterborough United (C, P)	46	27	11	8	75	38	1.974	65	Promotion to the Third Division
2	Gillingham (P)	46	25	12	9	90	49	1.837	62	Promotion to the Third Division
3	Colchester United (P)	46	24	12	10	73	36	2.028	60	Promotion to the Third Division
4	Bury (P)	46	24	11	11	81	49	1.653	59	Promotion to the Third Division
5	Northampton Town	46	20	13	13	63	48	1.313	53	
6	Reading	46	16	19	11	58	37	1.568	51	
7	Chester	46	17	15	14	54	55	0.982	49	
8	Bradford City	46	17	14	15	58	52	1.115	48	
9	Newport County	46	16	14	16	56	65	0.862	45 (Note: Newport County had one point deducted for fielding an ineligible player.)	
10	Exeter City	45	18	8	19	58	55	1.055	44 (Note: Scunthorpe United v. Exeter was never played; Exeter failed to turn up and Scunthorpe were awarded the points.)	
11	Hartlepool	46	16	12	18	48	47	1.021	44	
12	Lincoln City	46	16	12	18	63	67	0.940	44	
13	Barnsley	46	17	10	19	58	64	0.906	44	
14	Swansea City	46	16	11	19	45	46	0.978	43	
15	Rotherham United	46	15	13	18	56	58	0.966	43	
16	Torquay United	46	13	17	16	52	57	0.912	43	
17	Mansfield Town	46	13	17	16	62	69	0.899	43	
18	Scunthorpe United	45	14	12	19	47	64	0.734	42	
19	Brentford	46	12	16	18	48	50	0.960	40	
20	Darlington	46	13	13	20	40	62	0.645	39	
21	Crewe Alexandra	46	14	10	22	43	71	0.606	38	Re-elected
22	Doncaster Rovers	46	12	11	23	47	80	0.588	35	Re-elected
23	Workington	46	11	13	22	43	74	0.581	35	Re-elected
24	Stockport County	46	7	20	19	44	69	0.638	34	Re-elected

Source: rsssf.com
(C) Champions; (P) Promoted

=== Top goalscorers ===
First Division

- Mick Channon (Southampton) – 21 goals

Second Division

- Duncan McKenzie (Nottingham Forest) – 26 goals

Third Division

- Billy Jennings (Watford) – 26 goals

Fourth Division

- Brian Yeo (Gillingham) – 31 goals

== FA Cup ==
The 1974 FA Cup Final was won by Liverpool, who beat Newcastle United 3–0 at Wembley with two goals from Kevin Keegan and one from Steve Heighway. Burnley beat Leicester City 1–0 at Filbert Street in the fifth and final third-place playoff, held five days after the final.

The quarter-final tie between Newcastle and Nottingham Forest was halted mid-match when "hundreds of fans" invaded the St James' Park pitch, one of whom attacked Forest's midfielder Dave Serella. As a result, Newcastle's win was annulled and the teams were ordered to replay, and the Football Association banned Newcastle from hosting home cup games the following season.

Surprises in the earlier rounds included Alvechurch's first round defeat of Exeter City and a 4–0 second round replay win for a Walton & Hersham team that included Dave Bassett over a Brighton & Hove Albion side managed by Brian Clough. Second Division Bristol City knocked out Leeds United 1–0 at Elland Road in a fifth round replay.

== League Cup ==
Bill McGarry's Wolverhampton Wanderers beat Manchester City 2–1 in the final at Wembley Stadium with Kenny Hibbitt and John Richards getting the Wolves goals and Colin Bell replying for City. It was Wolves' first League Cup, and their first major trophy since the Stan Cullis era more than a decade earlier.

Plymouth Argyle of the Third Division reached the semi-finals before losing to Manchester City.

== European football ==
Tottenham Hotspur reached the UEFA Cup final but lost 4–2 on aggregate to Feyenoord. Tottenham Hotspur supporters rioted after the second leg in Rotterdam, following Feyenoord's victory.

== England national team ==
England defeated Austria 7–0 at Wembley in their first international of the season, with Mick Channon, Allan Clarke and Tony Currie each scoring twice. England failed to qualify for the 1974 World Cup, however, after Poland held them to a 1–1 draw at Wembley in the final qualifying game in October.

Alf Ramsey was sacked in April 1974 after 11 years as England manager. Joe Mercer then took over the role on a caretaker basis. England's first match since Ramsey's dismissal ended in a 2–0 win over Wales in the Home Championship. England finished second in the competition after being beaten 2–0 by Scotland at Hampden Park.

In July 1974, Don Revie accepted the Football Association's offer to manage the England team, ending his 13-year reign as manager of Leeds United.

== Player awards ==
- Veteran Liverpool winger Ian Callaghan won the FWA Footballer of the Year award for his contribution to his club's successful season.
- This season also saw the inauguration of two new awards by the Professional Footballers' Association, both of which were voted for by footballers. The PFA Players' Player of the Year award was won by Norman Hunter of Leeds United, whilst the PFA Young Player of the Year award was won by Kevin Beattie of Ipswich Town.

== Diary of the season ==
25 August 1973: Champions Liverpool begin the new league season with a 1–0 win at home to Stoke City.

30 September 1973: Leeds United top the First Division at the end of September, leading Coventry City by three points having dropped one point from their first nine matches. At the bottom, Birmingham City and West Ham United are still looking for their first league wins of the season.

15 October 1973: Brian Clough, the Derby County manager, and his assistant Peter Taylor, leave the club after a dispute with the club's directors.

20 October 1973: Leeds United beat Liverpool 1–0 at Elland Road to move eight points ahead of the reigning champions.

23 October 1973: The eight-day saga of Brian Clough and Derby County, which has seen numerous protests by the club's fans calling for his reinstatement, ends when former Rams player Dave Mackay resigns as Nottingham Forest manager to take charge of his old club.

31 October 1973: Leeds United are five points ahead of Everton, newly promoted Burnley and Derby County at the end of October.

1 November 1973: Brian Clough and his assistant Peter Taylor return to the game after accepting an offer to take charge of Third Division club Brighton & Hove Albion.

30 November 1973: Leeds United, without a league title since 1969, are seven points clear at the top, and still unbeaten, at the end of November. Newcastle United, Burnley, Everton and Liverpool lead the chasing pack. Birmingham City and West Ham United remain at the foot of the table, and have been joined in the relegation zone by Norwich City.

31 December 1973: At the end of the year, Leeds United are still unbeaten in the league, and now lead nearest rivals Liverpool by eight points. Only goal difference keeps Manchester United, level on points with Birmingham City, out of the relegation zone.

31 January 1974: Leeds United remain eight points ahead of Liverpool at the end of January. An improved run of form has seen West Ham United move out of the bottom three at the expense of Manchester United.

2 February 1974: Ipswich Town thrash Southampton 7–0 at Portman Road in the biggest win of the First Division season.

23 February 1974: After beginning the season with a 29-match unbeaten run, Leeds United finally suffer defeat when they are beaten 3–2 by Stoke City at the Victoria Ground. However, they remain eight points ahead of Liverpool, who have moved six points ahead of third-placed Derby County.

16 March 1974: Liverpool beat Leeds United 1–0 at Anfield to move six points behind the Yorkshire side with two games in hand. At the other end of the table, Manchester United's relegation problems continue as they lose 1–0 to Birmingham City, who also remain in the bottom three.

30 March 1974: Leeds United lose 3–1 at West Ham United, their third league defeat in a row, handing control of the title race to Liverpool, who are now four points behind with three games in hand.

8 April 1974: Liverpool's hopes of retaining their league title are hit by a 1–0 defeat away to Sheffield United.

20 April 1974: Liverpool draw 0–0 at home to Everton, allowing Leeds United to move to the verge of the title with a 3–2 win over Ipswich Town. Norwich City are relegated to the Second Division.

24 April 1974: Liverpool's 1–0 home defeat by Arsenal ends their double hopes and hands the league title to Leeds United.

27 April 1974: Manchester United go into the Manchester derby at Old Trafford needing to beat neighbours City to stand any chance of avoiding relegation, six years after winning the European Cup. They lose 1–0 with former club hero Denis Law scoring City's only goal, but would have been relegated even if they had won due to Birmingham City winning. Birmingham's win also relegates Southampton, despite the Saints' 3–0 win away to Everton. Leeds United end the season with a 1–0 away win over Queens Park Rangers.

12 July 1974: Bill Shankly announced his retirement as manager after 15 years. He is to be succeeded by his 55-year-old assistant Bob Paisley.

30 July 1974: Brian Clough leaves Brighton & Hove Albion to become the new manager of Leeds United, but his assistant Peter Taylor remains at the Goldstone Ground and steps into the manager's seat there.
