= Gary Locke (English footballer) =

English footballer

Personal information
- Full name: Gary Robert Locke
- Date of birth: 12 July 1954 (age 72)
- Place of birth: Park Royal, London, England
- Position: Full back

Youth career
- –: Chelsea

Senior career*
Years	Team	Apps	(Gls)
1971–1983	Chelsea	272	(3)
1982–1986	Crystal Palace	84	(1)
1986	Halmstads BK	20	(0)
1987–1991	Napier City Rovers	109	(9)
1992	Waikato United		

International career
1972	England Youth	4	(0)
- * Club domestic league appearances and goals

Gary Robert Locke (born 12 July 1954) is an English former footballer born in Willesden, London, who played in the Football League for Chelsea and Crystal Palace, and in the Allsvenskan for Halmstads BK.

Locke was born in Park Royal but moved to Willesden as a six-year-old with his family in 1960.

A right-back, Locke spent much of his career at Chelsea, making more than 300 league and cup appearances for the west London side between 1972 and 1983. He turned professional in July 1971, made his debut in a 3–1 win against Coventry City in the First Division on 30 September 1972, and scored his first goal for the club against the same opponents on 24 August 1974. Capable of making overlapping attacking runs up the wing, he was chosen as Chelsea Player of the Year in the 1973–74 season.

In 1983, after a spell on loan at the club, he moved to Crystal Palace on a permanent basis, making another 101 league and cup appearances in total, before spending the 1986 season in Sweden with Halmstads BK.

In 1987 Locke was brought to New Zealand by newly promoted National League club Napier City Rovers. He captained the team in 1988 and helped the club win the National League championship in 1989. Locke was left out of Napier's squad for the 1992 National League campaign.
