= Kevin Beattie =

English footballer (1953–2018)

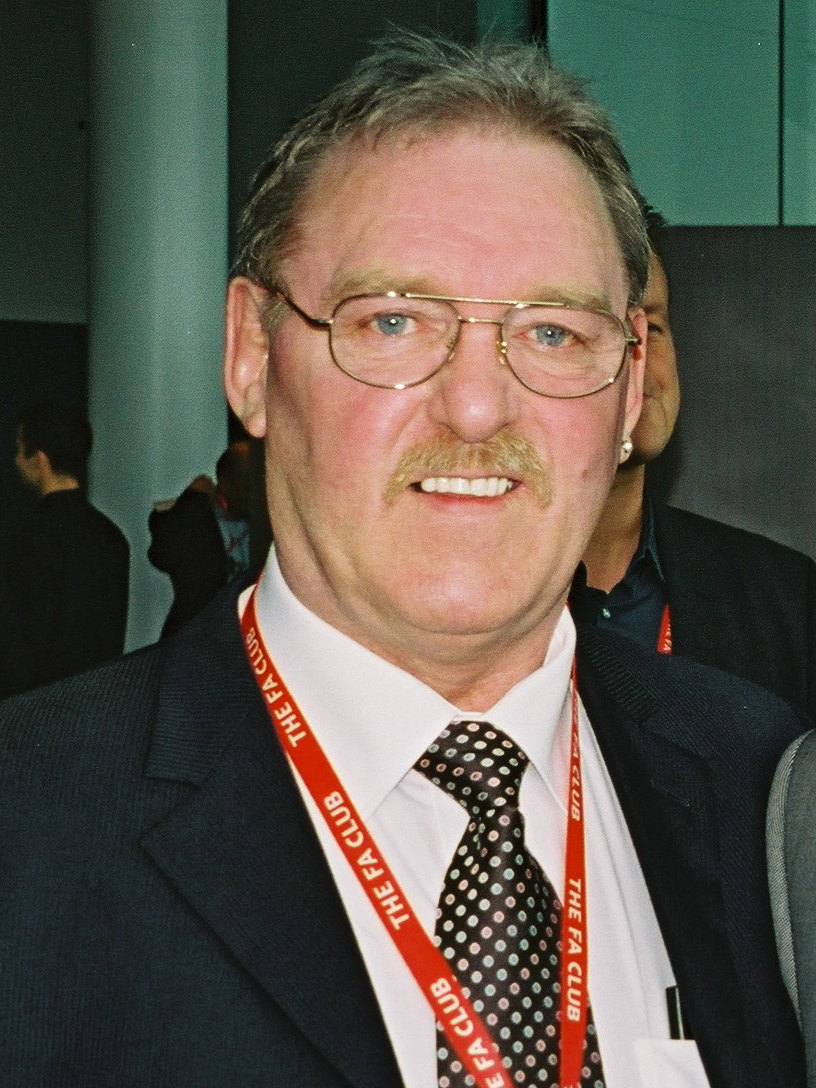
- Beattie in 2007

Personal information
- Full name: Thomas Kevin Beattie
- Date of birth: 18 December 1953
- Place of birth: Carlisle, England
- Date of death: 16 September 2018 (aged 64)
- Place of death: Ipswich, England
- Height: 5 ft 10 in (1.78 m)
- Position: Centre-half

Youth career
- 1971–1972: Ipswich Town

Senior career*
| Years | Team | Apps | (Gls) |
| 1972–1981 | Ipswich Town | 228 | (24) |
| 1982 | Colchester United | 4 | (0) |
| 1982 | Middlesbrough | 4 | (0) |
| 1983–1986 | Barnet | | |
- Harwich & Parkeston
| 1983–1984 | Sandvikens IF | | |
| 1987 | Kongsberg IF | | |
| 1988 | Nybergsund IL-Trysil | | |
- Clacton Town

International career
| 1972 | England Youth | 7 | (1) |
| 1972–1975 | England U23 | 9 | (1) |
| 1975–1977 | England | 9 | (1) |
- * Club domestic league appearances and goals

Thomas Kevin Beattie (18 December 1953 – 16 September 2018) was an English footballer. Born into poverty, he played at both professional and international levels, mostly as a centre-half. He spent the majority of his playing career at Ipswich Town, the club with which he won both the FA Cup and the UEFA Cup. He was also named the inaugural Professional Footballers' Association Young Player of the Year at the end of the 1972–73 season, and featured in the film Escape to Victory alongside many of his Ipswich teammates.

Beattie's playing career took him from rags to riches, but according to The Daily Telegraph he was "cursed by being both injury and accident prone". His playing career included some controversy, notably when he went missing after being selected for England's under-23 team. After retiring from playing he descended into unemployment and alcohol abuse, and contemplated suicide, before finding purpose once more and a new career in later life, as a football commentator on television and radio.

Beattie has been called Ipswich Town's best ever player by many pundits and polls. Ipswich (and later England) manager Bobby Robson called him the best England player he had seen.

== Early life ==
Thomas Kevin Beattie was born in Carlisle on 18 December 1953. His family lived in the Botcherby estate and he was one of nine children: five boys and four girls. He became known by his middle name, as his father was also named Thomas Beattie. Beattie's mother was a cleaner at a Lipton tea shop, whilst his father worked for the National Coal Board, delivering coal. The elder Thomas played amateur football as a goalkeeper and once had a trial with Aston Villa, but turned down an offer to join the club as he could earn more working for the Coal Board. After he was forced to give up work due to a back problem, the family suffered financially and were often short of food, leading to the young Beattie taking fruit and vegetables from local allotments. In later life, he recalled, "There was often only food on the table when Dad had backed a winning horse, or else won a game of darts, or dominoes down at his local pub."

Beattie supported his local football team, Carlisle United, and idolised players like Hughie McIlmoyle. He recalled being "devastated" when McIlmoyle was too busy to sign an autograph outside the club, resolving never to turn down such requests. Beattie attended St Cuthbert's Roman Catholic junior school, where he began playing football for the school team, initially as a goalkeeper. His family were unable to afford the football boots he needed, but a teacher named Mr Raffety bought a pair for him. Beattie soon became a forward and modelled himself on Chelsea's Peter Osgood.

Although Beattie passed his eleven-plus exams, his family could not afford the grammar school uniform, so he moved to St Patrick's Roman Catholic senior school. He began playing for Blackfriars, a local youth team managed by Raffety, and also, from the age of 14, for a pub team, alongside his father. Raffety recommended him to Carlisle United, but the club did not have a youth team. He left school aged 14, and subsequently worked as a machine fitter and delivery boy in factories, a warehouse, a dry cleaner and then a furniture company.

== Club career ==
=== Ipswich Town ===
==== Youth ====
At the age of 15, Beattie was playing for Blackfriars on Sunday and for a club called St Augustine on Saturdays, when he was spotted by a football scout and offered a trial with Liverpool. Beattie travelled to Liverpool and impressed manager Bill Shankly sufficiently for him to be invited back to sign for the club. Beattie returned to Liverpool on his own, but nobody from the club arrived to meet him at Lime Street station. After waiting an hour and assuming they had lost interest, and with nothing but his boots and train ticket, he returned home to Carlisle. Shankly would later describe missing out on signing the youngster as one of his biggest mistakes.

Soon after this, Beattie joined Ipswich Town as an apprentice. Ipswich manager Bobby Robson made sure that he was met at Euston station in London, played in a youth match at Fulham, and was accompanied all the way to Ipswich's Portman Road ground by the club's chief scout, Ron Gray. Robson told Gray, "If you miss him, you've lost your job". The poverty Beattie came from was evident when he arrived in Ipswich wearing his father's shoes, so when Ipswich signed him, the club immediately bought him some clothes. As a youth he had played as a striker, but Robson converted him into a defender, usually a centre-half; the player said in later life that the move suited him well, as it meant he could see all the play in front of him.

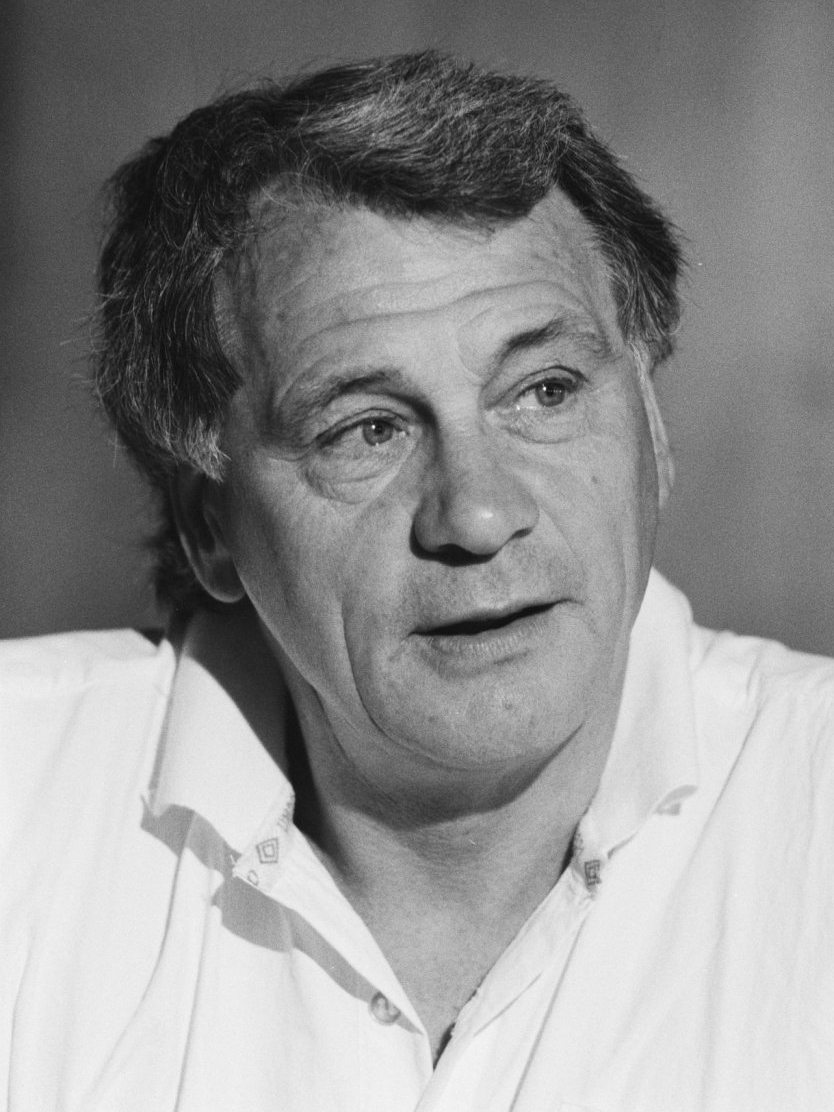
Bobby Robson, Beattie's first professional manager and a lifelong admirer of the player

Now earning a wage, Beattie tried to help support his family, sending money home each week. He also stepped in to prevent domestic violence between his parents: "I became extremely upset when I found out that Dad was spending the money that I had been sending home on drink and Mum was going without. Not only that but I also found out that his drinking had got worse and he had started knocking Mum around."

==== Senior ====
Beattie was given his first-team debut aged 18 against Manchester United in the opening match of the 1972–73 season in England's top division. Ipswich won the game 2–1, and afterwards he asked United's Bobby Charlton for his autograph; Charlton told Beattie that his play reminded him of Duncan Edwards and that, in years to come, he would be the one signing autographs. Beattie scored his first league goal for the club two weeks later at Elland Road in a 3–3 draw with Leeds United. That season he featured 38 times for Ipswich in the league and scored 5 goals; Ipswich ended in fourth place, their best finish since the Championship-winning 1961–62 season under Alf Ramsey. Beattie was also part of the 1972–73 Texaco Cup-winning team, which defeated Norwich City 4–2 on aggregate over two legs, and he was named the inaugural winner of the Ipswich Town Player of the Year award.

The following season saw Beattie's first appearance in a European competition, with Ipswich having qualified for the UEFA Cup as a result of their fourth position in the league the previous season. He played in aggregate victories over Real Madrid (1–0), Lazio (6–4) and FC Twente (3–1), before the side lost on penalties to Lokomotive Leipzig, Beattie having scored his first European goal in the home leg. He appeared in all 42 league games for Ipswich that season (along with Mick Mills), made 15 other appearances in cup competitions, and was presented with the inaugural Professional Footballers' Association's (PFA) Young Player of the Year award. He was also once again voted his club's Player of the Year. Early in the 1974–75 season Beattie was involved in mild controversy against Stoke City when his tackle at Portman Road broke John Ritchie's leg. In the return fixture at Stoke's Victoria Ground, Beattie's teammate Allan Hunter was involved in an incident that left Stoke's Denis Smith with a broken leg. The crowd erupted in anger, directed at Beattie; Robson noted "There was a cauldron for 20 minutes. Kevin Beattie had to beat 28,000 people out there." Later that season, Beattie was awarded the captaincy for a game, against his home team Carlisle United. Having played 52 games and scored 6 goals during the season for Ipswich, he was elected by his peers as a member of the First Division Team of the Year. He had helped his club reach the semi-final of the 1974–75 FA Cup and to finish the league season in third position.

Beattie made 36 appearances for Ipswich during the 1975–76 season, scoring 4 goals. Ipswich finished sixth and were knocked out of the 1975–76 FA Cup in the fourth round. Towards the end of the season, he began to suffer from severe back pain, something he blamed on an injury incurred as a child while helping his father carry sacks of coal. Despite the relative lack of success with his club, he was selected in the First Division Team of the Year for the second year in a row. The 1976–77 season started well for Ipswich with victories over Liverpool and Manchester United. Ipswich then achieved a club record-equalling 7–0 win over West Bromwich Albion: the Albion goalkeeper John Osborne said of Beattie's long-range goal that he regarded himself as fortunate he had not touched it as it would have knocked his hand off. Beattie's season was prematurely curtailed by a self-inflicted injury: stoking a bonfire at his home, he decided to add petrol; the ensuing flare-up gave him serious burns to his face and neck, leading to him missing six matches. Before the injury, Ipswich were challenging for the league title, but, in Beattie's absence, the side lost four of their last six matches and missed out on winning the championship by five points. He played in 34 games for Ipswich that season, scoring 5 goals, and was selected for the PFA Team of the Year for the third time in a row, along with teammates Mick Mills and Brian Talbot.

Beattie was fit to play by the start of the 1977–78 season, but a knee injury sustained in a league match led to him withdrawing from the England squad to face Luxembourg. Further investigation revealed he had damaged cartilage in his knee, which required an operation. Having had three weeks' recuperation and a cortisone injection, he was restored to the Ipswich squad in time to play in the third round UEFA Cup home leg against FC Barcelona. Ipswich won the fixture 3–0, and even though he suffered a reaction in his knee, he insisted he was able to play in the away leg. Robson disagreed, and Beattie was left out of the side for the game; Ipswich were knocked out on penalties. Cortisone injections became commonplace for Beattie, who returned to the team in time for the FA Cup fourth-round victory against Hartlepool. Although Ipswich's form in the league was poor, they were safe from relegation by the time they faced West Bromwich Albion in the FA Cup semi-final at Highbury, a game for which Beattie was given the all-clear. A 3–1 victory saw Ipswich into the final, yet the next day his knee was once again swollen and his participation in the final was in jeopardy. According to Beattie, "the boss secretly told me that if I felt fit enough to play then I was in". Robson did not announce the Cup final team until the last minute: it included a formation change to include five midfielders and Paul Mariner as a lone striker – and Beattie in defence. Roger Osborne's late goal for Ipswich was the only score of the game, and they won the trophy. Beattie had three cortisone injections to get through the final. Following the cup final success, he and teammates Robin Turner and David Geddis were awarded the freedom of Carlisle. Beattie had represented Ipswich 21 times during the course of the season, without scoring a goal.

Shortly into the 1978–79 season, Beattie suffered problems with his other knee. Two further operations followed, and he was confined to treatment and physiotherapy, only, in his words, "wheeled out for the really big games". Overall, he made 26 appearances that season, scoring twice. The 1979–80 season saw him make just 12 appearances, twice as substitute, and score twice, as his post-match recuperation took weeks, not days. He also played a "bit-part" in the 1980–81 season, usually as a striker instead of his usual position of centre-half. However, his defensive role in the two-leg victory over the Czechoslovak team Bohemians, in the second round of the 1980–81 UEFA Cup, for which he was awarded man of the match, proved vital to Ipswich's season. Although irregularly selected as a result of his injuries, Beattie played in the fourth round, first leg 4–1 away victory over AS Saint-Étienne, whose team included Michel Platini and Johnny Rep. Ipswich won the home leg 3–1 without Beattie. He played his last match for Ipswich in April 1981, in an FA Cup semi-final loss to Manchester City in which he broke his arm. Ipswich won the UEFA Cup at the end of the season, but Beattie was not presented with a winner's medal as he did not play in the final or even appear on the bench, through injury; 26 years later, a petition was organised by Rob Finch, the writer of Beattie's 2007 biography The Greatest Footballer England Never Had, calling on UEFA to right the wrong. Beattie was finally awarded a medal by UEFA president Michel Platini at the 2008 UEFA Cup Final between Rangers and Zenit Saint Petersburg.

Beattie retired due to injury in December 1981, following five knee operations in four years. His testimonial game took place in March 1982, against a Dynamo Moscow XI.

=== Later career ===
In the off-season of 1982, Beattie began training with Norwich City under manager Ken Brown who offered him a short-term contract. The offer was soon withdrawn because Ipswich were reluctant to release Beattie to their local rivals. Instead, he joined another East Anglian team, Colchester United, whose player-manager was Allan Hunter, a former team-mate of Beattie. Beattie made six appearances for the club, four of those in the league, but when teammate John Lyons committed suicide, Hunter resigned, and Beattie decided to move on. He signed for Middlesbrough, where he made five appearances during that season, scoring once, a penalty, in a 2–0 FA Cup victory over Notts County. His time at the club ended when he suffered a serious groin injury whilst playing against north-east rivals Newcastle United.

Dropping into non-League football, Beattie signed for Barry Fry's Barnet, joining another ex-England international, Steve Whitworth. Injury and, according to Beattie, "a combination of the drink and depression" curtailed his spell at the club. After failing to secure any coaching work, Beattie took up work as a labourer, and joined local team Harwich & Parkeston to supplement his income. Accepting an offer from Ipswich's former scout Ron Gray, Beattie joined Swedish second-tier side Sandvikens IF under manager and former Swedish international player, Thomas Nordahl. Soon afterward, Nordahl suddenly resigned and the club let Beattie go. He moved to Norway, signing for fourth division club Kongsberg IF, where he scored more than 60 goals in his first season. He signed for Norwegian second division club Nybergsund IL-Trysil in 1988, making five appearances for them before moving back to England. He also played for Clacton Town. He assisted Mike Walker and Duncan Forbes at Norwich City as a scout during Walker's time as manager and performed a similar role for Alan Ball Jr. at Portsmouth. Beattie's first foray into coaching was a part-time position at his hometown club Carlisle United under Roddy Collins in the 2002–03 season. Collins was sacked early in the 2003–04 season, and Beattie left the club, subsequently opting to coach school children in the United States. His last coaching position was a short spell with Barry Fry at Peterborough United.

== International career ==
Former Ipswich manager and then-England manager Alf Ramsey selected Beattie to represent the England under-23 team during the 1972–73 English domestic season. He made his debut in November 1972 against Wales under-23s at Vetch Field in Swansea, England winning 3–0. His final under-23 game also saw his only goal at that level, in a 2–0 victory, once again over Wales, this time at the Racecourse Ground in Wrexham.

Beattie's senior England debut came under Don Revie, a starting role in a 5–0 victory over Cyprus at Wembley in April 1975, especially notable for Malcolm Macdonald scoring all five goals. Beattie managed to put the ball in the net, but the goal was disallowed for a foul on the goalkeeper; ultimately, the only goal he scored for his country was in May 1975, during a 5–1 victory over Scotland in the 1974–75 British Home Championship. Perry Groves, who played alongside Beattie at Colchester United, describes how Beattie, ostensibly playing at left-back, emerged to meet a cross from Kevin Keegan, beat two Scottish defenders and "looped a great header" into the goal, voted one of the top 50 goals England have scored. His final game for England was in October 1977 against Luxembourg in a qualification match for the 1978 FIFA World Cup. In total, he earned nine caps between 1975 and 1977, scoring once.

== Style of play ==
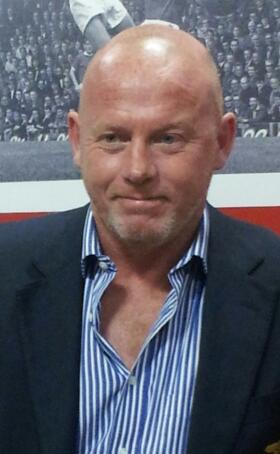
Perry Groves, who began his career playing alongside Beattie, included him in the book he wrote about his 20 "football heroes".

Beattie was renowned for his strength, the nickname "Beast" reflecting that, but also his quality on the ball (with the resultant other nickname of "Diamond"). Robson described him as "the quickest defender I ever saw ... with a left foot like a howitzer". Perry Groves noted that Beattie's only shortcoming appeared to be his inability to throw the ball far. When Beattie arrived at Colchester, "into his thirties" and with his knees "all shot", "he was still the quickest player at the club over ten yards by a long way." Groves recalls Robson's summary of Beattie's strengths as a player:

What a player the boy was ... He could climb higher than the crossbar and still head the ball down. He had the sweetest left foot I've ever seen and could hit 60-yard passes, without looking, that eliminated six opposition players from the game. He had the strength of a tank, was lightning quick and he could tackle.

During his years with Ipswich, Beattie formed a central defensive partnership with Allan Hunter. Robson described them as 'Bacon and eggs'. Interviewed in 2018, Hunter talked about their partnership:

we just gelled and if I went and done things to attack the ball he was always behind me – and vice-versa. We didn't need to work at it because it was something that came naturally ... We were just a good partnership ... me and Beat would be sitting on the other side of a room from each other and we would know what the other was thinking because there were times I would, or he would, burst out laughing and the boys would say, what you bloody laughing at? And we would say "mind your own business" ... It helped on the field because we didn't even have to talk because we knew each other's play.

== Incidents and controversies ==
In December 1974, Beattie was involved in an incident that prompted newspaper headlines across the quality and tabloid press. Called up to represent England at under-23 level against Scotland under-23s at Pittodrie, Beattie was "put on the right train by his manager Bobby Robson", yet failed to arrive in Manchester. That Beattie was "found" playing dominoes with his father in a pub in Carlisle helped substantiate the story, although England manager Don Revie sent Beattie a telegram wishing him a happy birthday, the following day. Groves' account, 30 years later, is that when Beattie's train pulled into Carlisle station, he saw the name, felt homesick and went to visit his father. Media coverage at the time ascribed Beattie's lapses to pressure; factors cited included his then four-week-old daughter, his rags-to-riches climb and a virus. Subsequent reports that he then missed training for Ipswich, allegedly preferring to stay in bed when passed fit by the club doctor, fuelled the story further. Ipswich suspended him for one match.

Beattie accepted a lit cigarette from a fan and smoked it whilst collecting his FA Cup winner's medal in 1978. According to Groves, Beattie smoked 20 cigarettes a day for the duration of his playing career; he also missed part of pre-season for Colchester because he "strained too much" while defecating, resulting in a pulled stomach muscle.

== Post-football, family life and death ==
Beattie was unemployed on several occasions after finishing his playing career. Groves writes about how the unemployment office where Beattie would sign on was so close to Ipswich's home ground that he would see players arriving in their "flash motors", while he signed autographs. After running a pub, he began drinking very heavily and was on one occasion given the last rites when his pancreas "packed up". He considered suicide, but was able to care for his wife who was seriously unwell, and, according to Groves, managed to get "his life back on the right track". Nonetheless, Beattie became impoverished, and despite receiving £50,000 from a testimonial match organised by Ipswich Town, he depended on financial help from the PFA. In later years, Beattie worked for broadcast media; he commented on football for BBC Radio Suffolk until the day before his death. He also co-wrote his autobiography, The Beat, published in 1998. In May 2012, Beattie was convicted of benefit fraud and given a 12-week curfew. He had failed to disclose his earnings from radio, for fear of losing Income Support. He later apologised and described it as a "silly mistake".

Beattie met his future wife Margaret Boldy, known as Maggie, in the late 1960s or early 1970s in a youth club near to his apprentice accommodation, Beattie describing it as "love at first sight". They married in 1974, and soon afterward she appeared in Radio Times in a "Footballers' Wives" feature; at that point the couple were still living in a "modest" club-owned house. Maggie was diagnosed with multiple sclerosis during the mid-1980s; she later used a wheelchair, with Beattie as her carer in their council-owned bungalow. They had three daughters, Emma, Sarah and Louise.

His playing career injuries gave Beattie difficulties in later life: by the time he was 53 he was "unable to walk more than half a mile", owing to the arthritis in his knees. He refused to bow to his difficulties: "Maggie, bless her, never complains", he said to a Daily Telegraph reporter, "so why should I feel any anger at how life turned out?". On 16 September 2018, Beattie died of a suspected heart attack at the age of 64. He was survived by his wife and daughters. His funeral was held at the crematorium at Nacton on 26 October 2018. Former Ipswich and England player Terry Butcher paid tribute to Beattie, calling him "the complete footballer" and describing his left-footed shot as an "Exocet". George Burley referred to Beattie as "a legend", while John Wark, whose nickname for Beattie was "Monster", described him as the best-ever Ipswich player.

== Legacy ==
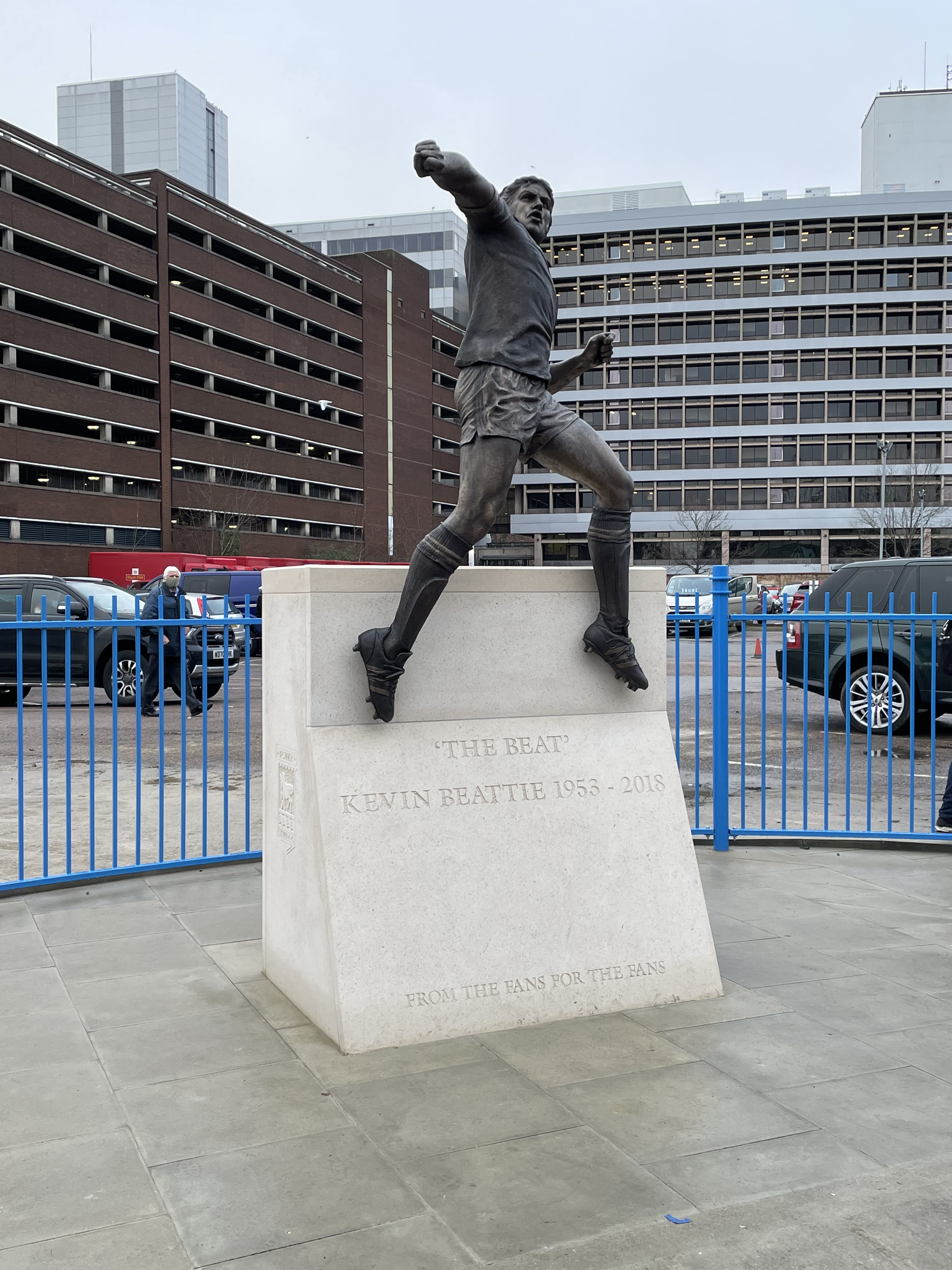
Statue of Beattie outside Portman Road

Beattie was once described by Bobby Robson as the best England player he had seen, and that he could have rivalled Duncan Edwards. Beattie was inducted into the Ipswich Town Hall of Fame in 2008, was voted numerous times as Ipswich Town's "best ever player", and features as one of Perry Groves' 20 "Football Heroes" in a book published in 2009.

Along with some of his Ipswich teammates, Beattie featured in the 1981 film Escape to Victory. His skills were shown on the pitch as the body double for Michael Caine's prisoner-of-war character, and the two became friends. Beattie had a cooler relationship with Sylvester Stallone, who also starred in the film: "There weren't too many that got on that well with him and after I beat him in an arm wrestle – first my right arm and then my left – he didn't speak to me again". A campaign for a permanent memorial to Beattie to be placed outside Portman Road, along with the existing statues of Robson and Ramsey, was started soon after his death by Ipswich Star and East Anglian Daily Times editor Brad Jones. The design for the statue was revealed on 19 March 2019 by local sculptor Sean Hedges-Quinn. It was confirmed in August 2019 that the funds required to build the statue had been raised. On 18 December 2021, on what would have been Beattie's 68th birthday, his statue was officially unveiled outside Portman Road.

== Honours ==
Ipswich Town

- FA Cup: 1977–78
- UEFA Cup: 1980–81
- Texaco Cup: 1972–73

Individual

- PFA Young Player of the Year: 1972–73
- Ipswich Town Player of the Year: 1972–73, 1973–74
- Football League First Division PFA Team of the Year (3): 1974–75, 1975–76, 1976–77
- Ipswich Town Hall of Fame: Inducted 2008

== Bibliography ==
- Finch, Rob (2007). The Greatest Footballer England Never Had: The Kevin Beattie Story. Cult Figure Publishing. ISBN 978-0-9554884-0-5.
- Hayes, Dean (2006). The Who's Who of Ipswich Town. Breedon Books. ISBN 978-1-85983-515-9.
- Lynch, Tony (1995). The Official P.F.A. Footballers Heroes. Random House. ISBN 978-0-09-179135-3.
