= Jimmy Giles (footballer) =

English footballer and manager

Personal information
- Full name: James Giles
- Date of birth: 21 April 1946 (age 80)
- Place of birth: Kidlington, England
- Position: Centre back

Youth career
- Kidlington

Senior career*
Years	Team	Apps	(Gls)
1965–1968	Swindon Town	13	(0)
1968–1971	Aldershot	81	(3)
1971–1975	Exeter City	183	(6)
1975–1977	Charlton Athletic	93	(6)
1977–1981	Exeter City	130	(5)
1981–1983	Yeovil Town		

Managerial career
- 1981–1983: Yeovil Town
- * Club domestic league appearances and goals

James Giles (born 21 April 1946) is an English former footballer and manager. As a player, he was known as 'Farmer'.

Born in Kidlington, Oxfordshire, Giles played in the Football League for Swindon Town, Aldershot, Exeter City, Charlton Athletic and Exeter City again before leaving to become player-manager of Yeovil Town in 1981, a position he held until 1983. He has since worked for BBC Radio Devon and as a scout for sometime Charlton assistant manager Keith Peacock.

Giles was also an accomplished cricketer. He played for Worcestershire 2nd XI as a fast bowler and hard-hitting batsman.
