= 1981–82 Aston Villa F.C. season =

English football club season

Aston Villa
1981–82 season
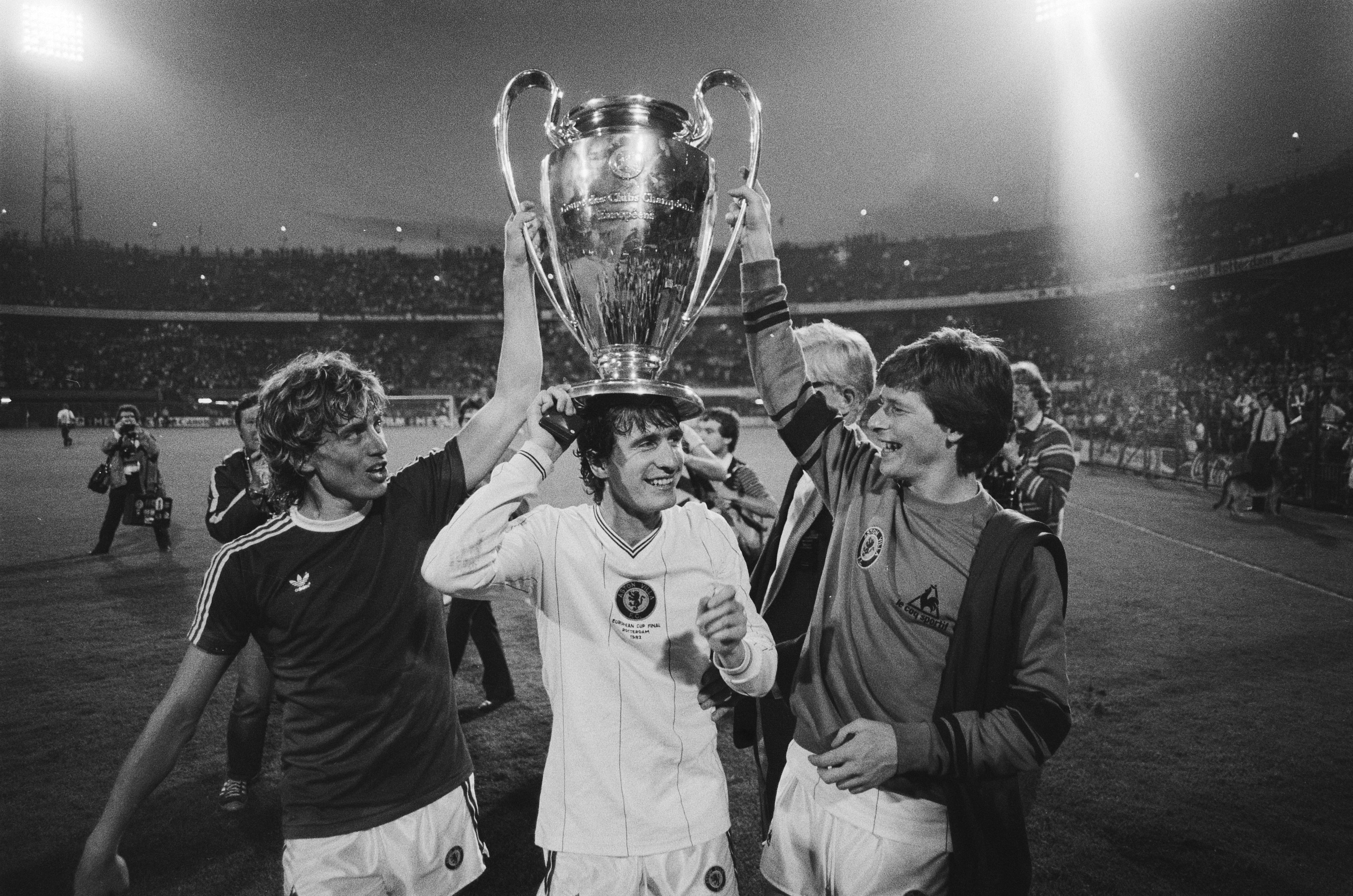
- Aston Villa celebrating their historic European Cup victory
- Chairman: Ron Bendall
- Manager: (1) Ron Saunders (2) Tony Barton
- Stadium: Villa Park
- First Division: 11th
- FA Cup: Fifth round
- League Cup: Fifth round
- European Cup: Winners
- Top goalscorer: League: Peter Withe (10 goals); All: Peter Withe (13 goals)

Second City Derby
- 38--28--25

The 1981–82 English football season was Aston Villa's 3rd season in Europe and 83rd season in the Football League. In May 1982, just three months after being appointed manager, Tony Barton guided Villa to a 1–0 victory over Bayern Munich in the European Cup final in Rotterdam. As of December 2023, Villa remain one of only six English teams to have won the European Cup, along with Chelsea, Liverpool, Manchester City, Manchester United and Nottingham Forest. They were the underdogs in the final and were expected to lose.

As defending First Division champions for the first time in 71 years, they qualified for the European Cup for the first time in their history. Their first game in the competition was against Valur of Iceland, following by a second round clash with BFC Dynamo of East Germany, Dynamo Kiev of the Soviet Union in the quarter-finals and then Anderlecht of Belgium in the semi-finals before beating Bayern Munich of West Germany 1–0 in the final in Rotterdam, with Peter Withe scoring the winning goal.

Ron Saunders resigned on 9 February 1982. At the time, Villa were mid-table in the First Division and had reached the quarter-finals of the European Cup. There had been increasing tension between the manager and Chairman Ron Bendall with Saunders complaining about stadium manager Terry Rutter's expenditure and seeking more say over non-footballing matters. Rutter would later receive a suspended prison sentence having been prosecuted for conspiracy to defraud the Football Grounds Improvement Trust and obtaining money by deception from the Club. The judge stated that Bendall would have faced these charges too had he not died.

Saunders had been in charge since 1974, nearly eight years, winning a league title and two League Cups in the process. His successor was his assistant manager Tony Barton, who had been in charge for three months by the time Villa won the European Cup.

== First-team squad ==
Squad at end of season

Note: Flags indicate national team as defined under FIFA eligibility rules; some limited exceptions apply. Players may hold more than one non-FIFA nationality.

Pos.	Nation	Player
GK	ENG	Jimmy Rimmer
GK	ENG	Nigel Spink
DF	ENG	Kenny Swain
DF	ENG	Colin Gibson
DF	ENG	Brendan Ormsby
DF	ENG	Mark Jones
DF	ENG	Pat Heard
DF	ENG	Gary Williams
DF	SCO	Ken McNaught
DF	SCO	Allan Evans
DF	IRL	Eamon Deacy

Pos.	Nation	Player
MF	ENG	Ivor Linton
MF	ENG	Tony Morley
MF	ENG	Dennis Mortimer
MF	ENG	Mark Walters
MF	ENG	Gordon Cowans
MF	ENG	Paul Birch
MF	ENG	Andy Blair
MF	SCO	Des Bremner
FW	ENG	Peter Withe
FW	ENG	Gary Shaw
FW	ENG	David Geddis
FW	IRL	Terry Donovan

== First Division ==
Pos	Team	Pld	W	D	L	GF	GA	GD	Pts	Qualification or relegation
9	West Ham United	42	14	16	12	66	57	+9	58	
10	Manchester City	42	15	13	14	49	50	−1	58	
11	Aston Villa	42	15	12	15	55	53	+2	57	Qualification for the European Cup first round (Note: Aston Villa qualified for the European Cup first round as the 1981–82 European Cup winners.)
12	Nottingham Forest	42	15	12	15	42	48	−6	57	
13	Brighton & Hove Albion	42	13	13	16	43	52	−9	52	

Source: World Football
Rules for classification: 1) Points; 2) Goal difference; 3) Goals scored

=== Matches ===
29 August 1981	Aston Villa	0–1	Notts County	Villa Park
		Report

2 September 1981	Sunderland	2–1	Aston Villa
		Report	Terry Donovan, 23

5 September 1981	Tottenham Hotspur	1–3	Aston Villa
		Report	Terry Donovan, 25, 45; Dennis Mortimer, 33

12 September 1981	Aston Villa	1–1	Manchester United	Villa Park
	Gordon Cowans, 16	Report

19 September 1981	Liverpool	0–0	Aston Villa
		Report

23 September 1981	Aston Villa	2–2	Stoke City	Villa Park
	Peter Withe, 38, 46	Report

26 September 1981	Aston Villa	0–0	Birmingham City	Villa Park
		Report

3 October 1981	Leeds United	1–1	Aston Villa
		Report	Gary Shaw, 8

10 October 1981	Coventry City	1–1	Aston Villa
		Report	Gary Shaw, 21

17 October 1981	Aston Villa	3–2	West Ham United	Villa Park
	Tony Morley, 25; David Geddis, 26; Dennis Mortimer, 40	Report

24 October 1981	Wolverhampton Wanderers	0–3	Aston Villa
		Report	Gary Shaw, 30, 46; Own Goal, 44

31 October 1981	Aston Villa	0–1	Ipswich Town	Villa Park
		Report

7 November 1981	Aston Villa	0–2	Arsenal	Villa Park
		Report

21 November 1981	Middlesbrough	3–3	Aston Villa
	Peter Withe, 6; Gordon Cowans, 61; Gary Shaw, 65	Report

28 November 1981	Aston Villa	3–1	Nottingham Forest	Villa Park
	Des Bremner, 6, 38; Peter Withe, 77	Report

5 December 1981	Manchester City	1–0	Aston Villa
		Report

15 December 1981	Swansea City	2–1	Aston Villa
		Report	Own Goal, 14

19 December 1981	Everton	2–0	Aston Villa
		Report

28 December 1981	Brighton & Hove Albion	0–1	Aston Villa
		Report	Tony Morley, 62

16 January 1982	Notts County	1–0	Aston Villa
		Report

30 January 1982	Aston Villa	0–3	Liverpool	Villa Park
		Report

2 February 1982	Aston Villa	1–0	Sunderland	Villa Park
	David Geddis, 52	Report

6 February 1982	Manchester United	4–1	Aston Villa
		Report	David Geddis, 21

10 February 1982	Aston Villa	1–1	Southampton	Villa Park
	Peter Withe, 66	Report

17 February 1982	Aston Villa	1–1	Tottenham Hotspur	Villa Park
	Peter Withe, 73	Report

20 February 1982	Birmingham City	0–1	Aston Villa
		Report	Peter Withe, 57

27 February 1982	Aston Villa	2–1	Coventry City	Villa Park
	Gordon Cowans, 5 (pen); Gary Shaw, 19	= https://www.avfchistory.co.uk/game/3682

6 March 1982	West Ham United	2–2	Aston Villa
		Report	Gordon Cowans, 18; Peter Withe, 60

13 March 1982	Aston Villa	3–1	Wolverhampton Wanderers	Villa Park
	Terry Donovan, 26; Tony Morley, 35; Gary Shaw, 85	Report

20 March 1982	Ipswich Town	3–1	Aston Villa
		Report	Ken McNaught, 77

27 March 1982	Arsenal	4–3	Aston Villa
		Report	Gary Shaw, 19; Tony Morley, 38; Pat Heard, 65

30 March 1982	Aston Villa	2–1	West Bromwich Albion	Villa Park
	Gary Shaw, 49; Peter Withe, 70	Report

10 April 1982	Southampton	0–3	Aston Villa
		Report	Own Goal, 50; Ken McNaught, 68; Tony Morley, 90

12 April 1982	Aston Villa	3–0	Brighton & Hove Albion	Villa Park
	David Geddis, 53, 86; Allan Evans, 88	Report

17 April 1982	Aston Villa	1–0	Middlesbrough	Villa Park
	Allan Evans, 27	Report

24 April 1982	Nottingham Forest	1–1	Aston Villa
		Report	Gordon Cowans, 58 (pen)

28 April 1982	Aston Villa	1–4	Leeds United	Villa Park
	David Geddis, 11	Report

1 May 1982	Aston Villa	0–0	Manchester City	Villa Park
		Report

5 May 1982	Stoke City	1–0	Aston Villa
		Report

8 May 1982	West Bromwich Albion	0–1	Aston Villa
		Report	Pat Heard, 89

15 May 1982	Aston Villa	1–2	Everton	Villa Park
	Gordon Cowans, 42	Report

21 May 1982	Aston Villa	3–0	Swansea City	Villa Park
	Tony Morley, 38; Des Bremner, 44; Peter Withe, 63	Report

Source: avfchistory.co.uk

== European Cup ==
=== First round ===
==== First leg ====
1981-09-16

Aston Villa (England)	5–0	(Iceland) Valur
Morley 6'; Withe 37', 68'; Donovan 40', 69'

Villa Park, Birmingham
Attendance: 20,481
Referee:

ASTON VILLA:
1	(England) Jimmy Rimmer
2	(England) Kenny Swain
3	(England) Colin Gibson
4	(Scotland) Allan Evans
5	(England) Brendan Ormsby
6	(England) Dennis Mortimer
7	(Scotland) Des Bremner
8	(Republic of Ireland) Terry Donovan
9	(England) Peter Withe
10	(England) Gordon Cowans
11	(England) Tony Morley
Manager:
(England) Ron Saunders

VALUR:
1
2
3
4
5
6
7
8
9
10
11
Manager: Volker Hofferbert

==== Second leg ====
1981-09-30

Valur (Iceland)	0–2	(England) Aston Villa
		Shaw 25', 70'

Reykjavík
Attendance: 3,500
Referee:

VALUR:
1
2
3
4
5
6
7
8
9
10
11
Manager: Volker Hofferbert

ASTON VILLA:
1	(England) Jimmy Rimmer
2	(England) Kenny Swain
3	(England) Colin Gibson
4	(Scotland) Allan Evans
5	(England) Brendan Ormsby
6	(England) Dennis Mortimer
7	(Scotland) Des Bremner
8	(England) Gary Shaw
9	(England) Peter Withe
10	(England) Gordon Cowans
11	(Scotland) Andy Blair
Manager:
(England) Ron Saunders

Villa won 7–0 on aggregate.

=== Second round ===
==== First leg ====
1981-10-21

BFC Dynamo (East Germany)	1–2	(England) Aston Villa
Riediger 50'		Morley 5', 85'

Friedrich-Ludwig-Jahn-Sportpark, East Berlin
Attendance: 25,000
Referee:

BFC DYNAMO:
1	(East Germany) Bodo Rudwaleit
2	(East Germany) Artur Ullrich
3	(East Germany) Michael Noack
4	(East Germany) Rainer Troppa
5	(East Germany) Norbert Trieloff
6	(East Germany) Frank Terletzki
7	(East Germany) Bernd Schulz
8	(East Germany) Rainer Ernst
9	(East Germany) Hans-Jürgen Riediger
10	(East Germany) Wolf-Rüdiger Netz
11	(East Germany) Ralf Sträßer
Manager:
(East Germany) Jürgen Bogs

ASTON VILLA:
1	(England) Jimmy Rimmer
2	(England) Gary Williams
3	(England) Colin Gibson
4	(Scotland) Allan Evans
5	(England) Brendan Ormsby
6	(England) Dennis Mortimer
7	(Scotland) Des Bremner
8	(England) Gary Shaw
9	(England) Peter Withe
10	(England) Gordon Cowans
11	(England) Tony Morley
Manager:
(England) Ron Saunders

==== Second leg ====
1981-11-04

Aston Villa (England)	0–1	(East Germany) BFC Dynamo
		Terletzki 15'

Villa Park, Birmingham
Attendance: 28,175
Referee:

ASTON VILLA:
1	(England) Jimmy Rimmer
2	(England) Kenny Swain
3	(England) Colin Gibson
4	(Scotland) Allan Evans
5	(England) Gary Williams
6	(England) Dennis Mortimer
7	(Scotland) Des Bremner
8	(England) Gary Shaw
9	(England) Peter Withe
10	(England) Gordon Cowans
11	(England) Tony Morley
Manager:
(England) Ron Saunders

BFC DYNAMO:
1
2
3
4
5
6
7
8
9
10
11
Manager:
(East Germany) Jürgen Bogs

2–2 on aggregate. Villa won on away goals rule.

=== Quarter final ===
==== First leg ====
1982-03-03

Dynamo Kiev (Soviet Union)	0–0	(England) Aston Villa

Kiev
Attendance: 20,000
Referee:

DYNAMO KIEV:
1	(Ukraine) Viktor Chanov
2	(Ukraine) Anatoliy Demyanenko
3	(Ukraine) Sergiy Zhuravlev
4	(Ukraine) Volodymyr Lozynskyi
5	(Ukraine) Sergiy Baltacha
6	(Ukraine) Volodymyr Bezsonov
7	(Ukraine) Andriy Bal
8	(Ukraine) Volodymyr Veremeyev
9	(Ukraine) Leonid Buryak
10	(Ukraine) Oleg Blokhin
11	(Ukraine) Viktor Khlus
Manager:
(Soviet Union) Valeri Lobanovsky

ASTON VILLA:
1	(England) Jimmy Rimmer
2	(England) Kenny Swain
3	(England) Gary Williams
4	(Scotland) Des Bremner
5	(Scotland) Ken McNaught
6	(England) Dennis Mortimer
7	(Scotland) Andy Blair
8	(England) Gary Shaw
9	(England) Peter Withe
10	(England) Gordon Cowans
11	(England) Tony Morley
Manager:
(England) Tony Barton

==== Second leg ====
1982-03-17

Aston Villa (England)	2–0	(Soviet Union) Dynamo Kiev
Shaw 4'; McNaught 44'

Villa Park, Birmingham
Attendance: 38,579
Referee:

ASTON VILLA:
1	(England) Jimmy Rimmer
2	(England) Kenny Swain
3	(England) Gary Williams
4	(Scotland) Allan Evans
5	(Scotland) Ken McNaught
6	(England) Dennis Mortimer
7	(Scotland) Des Bremner
8	(England) Gary Shaw
9	(England) Peter Withe
10	(England) Gordon Cowans
11	(England) Tony Morley
Manager:
(England) Tony Barton

DYNAMO KIEV:
1	(Ukraine) Viktor Chanov
2	(Ukraine) Anatoliy Demyanenko
3	(Ukraine) Sergiy Zhuravlev
4	(Ukraine) Volodymyr Lozynskyi
5	(Ukraine) Sergiy Baltacha
6	(Ukraine) Andriy Bal
7	(Ukraine) Oleksandr Boyko
8	(Ukraine) Volodymyr Veremeyev
9	(Ukraine) Vadym Yevtushenko
10	(Ukraine) Oleg Blokhin
11	(Ukraine) Viktor Khlus
Manager:
(Soviet Union) Valeri Lobanovsky

Villa won 2–0 on aggregate.

=== Semi-final ===
==== First leg ====
1982-04-07

Aston Villa (England)	1–0	(Belgium) Anderlecht
Morley 27'

Villa Park, Birmingham
Referee:

ASTON VILLA:
1	(England) Jimmy Rimmer
2	(England) Kenny Swain
3	(England) Gary Williams
4	(Scotland) Allan Evans
5	(Scotland) Ken McNaught
6	(England) Dennis Mortimer
7	(Scotland) Des Bremner
8	(England) Gary Shaw
9	(England) Peter Withe
10	(England) Gordon Cowans
11	(England) Tony Morley
Manager:
(England) Tony Barton

ANDERLECHT:
1	(Belgium) Jacky Munaron
2	(Croatia) Luka Peruzovic
3	(Belgium) Hugo Broos
4	(Spain) Juan Lozano
5	(Belgium) Michel De Groote
6	(Belgium) Franky Vercauteren
7	(Belgium) Walter De Greef
8	(Belgium) Michel Renquin
9	(Iceland) Pétur Pétursson
10	(Belgium) Ludo Coeck
11	(Belgium) Albert Cluytens
Manager:
(Socialist Federal Republic of Yugoslavia) Tomislav Ivić

==== Second leg ====
1982-04-21

Anderlecht (Belgium)	0–0	(England) Aston Villa

Émile Versé Stadium, Brussels
Referee:

ANDERLECHT:
1
2
3
4
5
6
7
8
9
10
11
Manager:
(Socialist Federal Republic of Yugoslavia) Tomislav Ivić

ASTON VILLA:
1	(England) Jimmy Rimmer
2	(England) Kenny Swain
3	(England) Gary Williams
4	(Scotland) Allan Evans
5	(Scotland) Ken McNaught
6	(England) Dennis Mortimer
7	(Scotland) Des Bremner
8	(England) Gary Shaw
9	(England) Peter Withe
10	(England) Gordon Cowans
11	(England) Tony Morley
Manager:
(England) Tony Barton

Villa won 1–0 on aggregate.

=== Final ===
1982-05-26

Bayern Munich (West Germany)	0–1	(England) Aston Villa
		Withe 67'

Feijenoord Stadion, Rotterdam
Attendance: 39,776
Referee: Georges Konrath (France)

== FA Cup ==
=== Third round ===
Teams from the Football League First and Second Division entered in this round. The Third Round was intended to be played on 2 January 1982. However, some matched were played initially over the period 4–6 January, while others took place as late as 23 January. Most replays took place over 18–21 January. Enfield, Barnet and Altrincham from the Alliance Premier League at Step 5 of the English football system were the lowest-ranked teams in the round and the last non-league clubs left in the competition.

Tie no	Home team	Score	Away team	Date
8	Notts County (1)	0–6	Aston Villa (1)	5 January 1982

=== Fourth round ===
The Fourth Round was mainly played on 23 January 1982. Matches were played or replayed either on 26 January, or on 1 February. Fourth Division sides Blackpool and Hereford United were the lowest-ranked teams in the round.

Tie no	Home team	Score	Away team	Date
2	Bristol City	0–1	Aston Villa	23 January 1982

=== Fifth round ===
The Fifth Round matches were all played on 13 February 1982. The only replay was played on 16 February. Third Division side Oxford United was the lowest-ranked team in the round and was the last club from the First Round left in the competition.

Tie no	Home team	Score	Away team	Date
4	Tottenham Hotspur	1–0	Aston Villa	13 February 1982

== League Cup ==
=== Second round ===
==== First leg ====
Home team	Score	Away team	Date
Aston Villa	3–2	Wolverhampton Wanderers	7 October 1981

==== Second leg ====
Home team	Score	Away team	Date	Agg
Wolverhampton Wanderers	1–2	Aston Villa	27 October 1981	3–5

=== Third round ===
Home team	Score	Away team	Date
Leicester City	0–0	Aston Villa	11 November 1981

==== Replay ====
Home team	Score	Away team	Date
Aston Villa	2–0	Leicester City	25 November 1981

=== Fourth round ===
Home team	Score	Away team	Date
Wigan Athletic	1–2	Aston Villa	1 December 1981

=== Fifth round ===
Home team	Score	Away team	Date
Aston Villa	0–1	West Bromwich Albion	19 January 1982
