= 1979–80 Aston Villa F.C. season =

English football club season

Aston Villa
1979–80 season
- Chairman: (1) Harry Kartz (2) Ron Bendall
- Manager: Ron Saunders
- Stadium: Villa Park
- First Division: 7th
- FA Cup: Sixth round
- League Cup: Third round
- Top goalscorer: League: Gary Shaw (9); All: Gary Shaw (12)
- Highest home attendance: 41,660 vs Liverpool (8 December 1979)
- Lowest home attendance: 15,319 vs Middlesbrough (19 March 1980)

The 1979–80 English football season was Aston Villa's 81st season in the Football League and their 5th consecutive season in the top division.

On 8 September 1979, the national transfer record fee was broken when Wolverhampton Wanderers paid almost £1,500,000 for Villa's Scotland striker Andy Gray. In October John Gidman was sold to Everton for £650,000 (2013: £2,300,000) in a deal which saw left back Pat Heard (24) move the other way at a valuation of £150,000. Heard would make nine appearances in his first season at Villa Park. There were also debut appearances for Nigel Spink (361), Des Bremner (174), Tony Morley (137), David Geddis (47), Eamonn Deacy (33), Terry Donovan (24), Terry Bullivant (12), Mike Pejic (10), Noel Blake (4) and Robert Hopkins (3).

== First Division ==
Pos	Team	Pld	W	D	L	GF	GA	GD	Pts	Qualification or relegation
5	Nottingham Forest	42	20	8	14	63	43	+20	48	Qualification for the European Cup first round (Note: Nottingham Forest qualified for the European Cup first round as the 1979–80 European Cup winners.)
6	Wolverhampton Wanderers	42	19	9	14	58	47	+11	47	Qualification for the UEFA Cup first round (Note: Wolverhampton Wanderers qualified for the UEFA Cup as the 1979–80 Football League Cup winners.)
7	Aston Villa	42	16	14	12	51	50	+1	46	
8	Southampton	42	18	9	15	65	53	+12	45	
9	Middlesbrough	42	16	12	14	50	44	+6	44	

Source: World Football
Rules for classification: 1) Points; 2) Goal difference; 3) Goals scored
Notes:

Results summary

Overall								Home						Away					
Pld	W	D	L	GF	GA	GD	Pts	W	D	L	GF	GA	GD	W	D	L	GF	GA	GD
42	16	14	12	51	50	+1	46	11	5	5	29	22	+7	5	9	7	22	28	−6

Results by round

Round	1	2	3	4	5	6	7	8	9	10	11	12	13	14	15	16	17	18	19	20	21	22	23	24	25	26	27	28	29	30	31	32	33	34	35	36	37	38	39	40	41	42
Ground	A	H	H	A	H	A	H	A	H	H	A	A	H	A	H	H	A	H	A	H	A	A	H	H	A	A	H	H	A	H	A	H	H	H	A	H	A	A	A	A	H	A
Result	D	W	L	D	L	L	D	D	W	D	D	W	D	W	D	W	D	D	L	W	W	L	W	D	W	L	W	L	L	W	W	L	L	D	L	W	W	D	W	D	W	L
Position	7	10	7	12	15	17	19	21	19	12	13	15	14	14	9	10	9	8	7	9	7	5	8	5	4	3	4	3	6	8	6	5	6	9	8	9	9	6	7	5	6	5
Points	1	3	3	4	4	4	5	6	8	9	11	12	14	15	17	18	19	19	21	23	23	25	27	29	29	31	32	34	35	35	35	35	36	39	38	40	41	42	42	44	46	46

Source: WorldFootball
A = Away; H = Home; W = Win; D = Draw; L = Loss

=== Matches ===
18 August 1979 1	Bolton Wanderers	1–1	Aston Villa	Bolton
15:00 BST	Whatmore 76'	Report	73' Cowans	Stadium: Burnden Park; Attendance: 19,795; Referee: Gwyn Owen

22 August 1979 2	Aston Villa	2–1	Brighton & Hove Albion	Birmingham
15:00 BST	Evans 14' (pen.); Morley 66'	Report	45' Maybank	Stadium: Villa Park; Attendance: 28,803; Referee: George Flint

25 August 1979 3	Aston Villa	0–2	Bristol City	Birmingham
15:00 BST		Report	18', 90' (pen.) Mabbutt	Stadium: Villa Park; Attendance: 25,526; Referee: George Nolan

1 September 1979 4	Everton	1–1	Aston Villa	Liverpool
15:00 BST	Bailey 85'	Report	16' Morley	Stadium: Goodison; Attendance: 29,271; Referee: Don Shaw

8 September 1979 5	Aston Villa	0–3	Manchester United	Birmingham
15:00 BST		Report	17' Coppell; 70' Thomas; 86' Grimes	Stadium: Villa Park; Attendance: 34,859; Referee: Peter Reeves

15 September 1979 6	Crystal Palace	2–0	Aston Villa	Selhurst
15:00 BST	Murphy 42', 63'	Report		Stadium: Selhurst Park; Attendance: 28,156; Referee: Reg Robinson

22 September 1979 7	Aston Villa	0–0	Arsenal	Birmingham
15:00 BST		Report		Stadium: Villa Park; Attendance: 27,277; Referee: Ron Bridges

29 September 1979 8	Middlesbrough	0–0	Aston Villa	Middlesbrough
15:00 BST		Report		Stadium: Ayresome Park; Attendance: 16,017; Referee: Ken Redfern

6 October 1979 9	Aston Villa	3–0	Southampton	Birmingham
15:00 BST	Bremner 34', (yellow card); Mortimer 43'; Evans 79' (pen.)	Report		Stadium: Villa Park; Attendance: 24,377; Referee: Ken Salmon

13 October 1979 10	Aston Villa	0–0	West Bromwich Albion	Birmingham
15:00 BST	Swain (yellow card) 60'; Geddis (yellow card) 70'	Report		Stadium: Villa Park; Attendance: 36,007; Referee: John Hough

20 October 1979 11	Derby County	1–3	Aston Villa	Derby
15:00 BST	Emson 44'	Report	Little 6'; Shaw 58'; Mortimer 71'; Rimmer (yellow card) 29'; Ormsby (yellow card) 39'	Stadium: Baseball Ground; Attendance: 20,152; Referee: Derek Owen

27 October 1979 12	Wolverhampton Wanderers	1–1	Aston Villa	Wolverhampton
15:00 GMT	Gray 15'; Richards (red card) 60'	Report	Shaw 44'; Evans (yellow card) 7'; Mortimer (yellow card) 14'; Ormsby (red card) 60'	Stadium: Molineux Stadium; Attendance: 36,267; Referee: Derek Lloyd

3 November 1979 13	Aston Villa	3–1	Bolton Wanderers	Birmingham
15:00 GMT	Shaw 15'; Evans 41'; Mortimer 89'	Report	Whatmore 81'	Stadium: Villa Park; Attendance: 24,744; Referee: Mark Scott

10 November 1979 14	Ipswich Town	0–0	Aston Villa	Ipswich
15:00 GMT	Evans (yellow card) 72'	Report		Stadium: Portman Road; Attendance: 17,807; Referee: Clive White

17 November 1979 15	Aston Villa	2–1	Stoke City	Birmingham
15:00 GMT	Mortimer 23'; Evans 88' (pen.)	Report	Scott 11'; Smith (red card) 90'	Stadium: Villa Park; Attendance: 27,086; Referee: Bert Newsome

24 November 1979 16	Aston Villa	0–0	Leeds United	Birmingham
15:00 GMT	Geddis (yellow card) 66'	Report		Stadium: Villa Park; Attendance: 29,736; Referee: Ray Toseland

1 December 1979 17	Norwich City	1–1	Aston Villa	Norwich
15:00 GMT	Evans 22', (yellow card) 45'; Mortimer (red card) 89'	Report	Bond 89'; Fashanu (yellow card) 70' (yellow-red card) 70'	Stadium: Carrow Road; Attendance: 15,885; Referee: Tony Cox

8 December 1979 18	Aston Villa	1–3	Liverpool	Birmingham
15:00 GMT	Little 54'	Report	Kennedy 53'; Hansen 65'; McDermott 74'	Stadium: Villa Park; Attendance: 41,660; Referee: Clive Thomas

15 December 1979 19	Tottenham Hotspur	1–2	Aston Villa	Tottenham
15:00 GMT	Ardiles 76'	Report	Geddis 21'; Cowans 55' (pen.)	Stadium: White Hart Lane; Attendance: 30,555; Referee: Brian Hill

19 December 1979 20	Aston Villa	3–0	Coventry City	Birmingham
15:00 GMT	Donovan 8'; Little 51', 60'	Report		Stadium: Villa Park; Attendance: 24,446; Referee: Joe Worrall

26 December 1979 21	Nottingham Forest	2–1	Aston Villa	West Bridgford
15:00 GMT	Robertson 50'; Bowles 57'	Report	Shaw 64'	Stadium: City Ground; Attendance: 30,979; Referee: David Richardson

29 December 1979 22	Bristol City	1–3	Aston Villa	Bristol
15:00 GMT	Gow 75' (pen.)	Report	Shaw 52', 54', 86'	Stadium: Ashton Gate; Attendance: 18,221; Referee: Dennis Hedges

12 January 1980 23	Aston Villa	2–1	Everton	Birmingham
15:00 GMT	Gibson 63'; Donovan 82'	Report	Eastoe 87'	Stadium: Villa Park; Attendance: 22,635; Referee: Peter Richardson

2 February 1980 24	Aston Villa	2–1	Crystal Palace	Birmingham
15:00 GMT	Cowans 32'; Mortimer 90+3'	Report		Stadium: Ashton Gate; Attendance: 29,469; Referee: John Hunting

9 February 1980 25	Arsenal	3–1	Aston Villa	Highbury
15:00 GMT	Sunderland 26', 65'; Rix 48'	Report	Mortimer 68'	Stadium: Highbury; Attendance: 33,816; Referee: Tony Glasson

23 February 1980 26	West Bromwich Albion	1–2	Aston Villa	West Bromwich
15:00 GMT	Robson 42'	Report	McNaught 48'; Little 58'	Stadium: The Hawthorns; Attendance: 33,658; Referee: Mike Peck

27 February 1980 27	Aston Villa	2–2	Manchester City	Birmingham
15:00 GMT	Shaw 42'; Donachie 84' (o.g.)	Report	Robinson 60'; Bennett 79'	Stadium: Villa Park; Attendance: 29,139; Referee: Steve Bates

1 March 1980 28	Aston Villa	2–2	Derby County	Birmingham
15:00 GMT	Evans 43'; Mortimer (yellow card) 39'	Report		Stadium: Villa Park; Attendance: 28,956; Referee: Mike Bidmead

3 March 1980 29	Brighton & Hove Albion	1–1	Aston Villa	Hove
15:00 GMT	Clarke 26'	Report	Evans 33', (red card) 47'	Stadium: Goldstone Ground; Attendance: 23,077; Referee: Darryl Reeves

10 March 1980 30	Aston Villa	1–3	Wolverhampton Wanderers	Birmingham
15:00 GMT	Shaw 32'	Report	Brazier 20'; Bell 28'; Daniel 36'	Stadium: Villa Park; Attendance: 30,32; Referee: Cliff Maskell

15 March 1980 31	Southampton	2–0	Aston Villa	Southampton
15:00 GMT	Golac 40'; Channon 87'	Report	Gibson (yellow card) 90'	Stadium: The Dell; Attendance: 20,735; Referee: Ron Challis

19 March 1980 32	Aston Villa	0–2	Middlesbrough	Birmingham
15:00 GMT		Report	Ashcroft 38'; Armstrong 56'	Stadium: Villa Park; Attendance: 15,319; Referee: Gilbert Napthine

22 March 1980 33	Aston Villa	1–1	Ipswich Town	Birmingham
15:00 GMT	Morley 73'	Report	Wark 15'	Stadium: Villa Park; Attendance: 22,386; Referee: Brian Stevens

26 March 1980 34	Aston Villa	2–0	Norwich City	Birmingham
15:00 BST	Cowans (?); Hopkins 90+2'	Report		Stadium: Villa Park; Attendance: 17,956; Referee: Ken Walmsley

29 March 1980 35	Stoke City	2–0	Aston Villa	Stoke-on-Trent
15:00 BST	R. Evans 16'; Chapman 64'	Report		Stadium: Victoria Ground; Attendance: 16,234; Referee: Neil Midgley

5 April 1980 36	Aston Villa	3–2	Nottingham Forest	Birmingham
15:00 BST	Bremner 13'; Evans 41'; Lloyd 47' (o.g.)	Report	Birtles 28'; Bowyer 76'	Stadium: Villa Park; Attendance: 29,156; Referee: Ron Chadwick

7 April 1980 37	Manchester City	1–1	Aston Villa	Manchester
15:00 BST	Geddis 43', (red card) 90'	Report	Power 63'	Stadium: Maine Road; Attendance: 42,584; Referee: Derek Owen

19 April 1980 38	Leeds United	0–0	Aston Villa	Leeds
15:00 BST		Report		Stadium: Elland Road; Attendance: 15,840

23 April 1980 39	Manchester United	2–1	Aston Villa	Manchester
15:00 BST	Jordan (?)	Report	Bremner (?)	Stadium: Old Trafford; Attendance: 45,210

26 April 1980 40	Aston Villa	2–1	Tottenham Hotspur	Birmingham
15:00 BST	Cowans (?)	Report		Stadium: Villa Park; Attendance: 20,459

29 April 1980 41	Coventry City	1–2	Aston Villa	Coventry
15:00 BST	Wallace (?)	Report	Cowans (?); Gibson (?)	Stadium: Highfield Road; Attendance: 17,969

3 May 1980 42	Liverpool	4–1	Aston Villa	Liverpool
15:00 BST	Johnson (?); Cohen (?) ? (?)	Report	? (?)	Stadium: Anfield; Attendance: 51,451
Note: Liverpool clinch the league title in their penultimate league game of the season by beating Aston Villa 4–1 at Anfield.

== League Cup ==
Competition	Started round	Final position / round	First match	Last match
Football League Cup	2nd round	3rd round	28 August 1979	9 October 1979

28 August 1979 2nd round 1st leg	Colchester United	0–2	Aston Villa	Colchester
		Report	Shaw 35', 73'	Stadium: Layer Road; Attendance: 6,221; Referee: B Hill

5 September 1979 2nd round 2nd leg	Aston Villa	0–2 (a.e.t.) (9–8 p)	Colchester United	Birmingham
		Report	Lee 19'; Gough 79'	Stadium: Villa Park; Attendance: 19,475
Note: Match drawn 2–2 on aggregate, Aston Villa won 9–8 on penalties

25 September 1979 3rd round	Aston Villa	0–0	Everton	Birmingham
19:00 BST		Report		Stadium: Villa Park; Attendance: 22,635; Referee: Tony Glasson

9 October 1979 3rd round replay	Everton	4–1	Aston Villa	Liverpool
19:30 BST	Kidd 5'; Latchford 12', 71'; Rimmer 75' (o.g.)	Report	Swain 88'	Stadium: Goodison Park; Attendance: 22,080; Referee: Trelford Mills

== FA Cup ==
Competition	Started round	Final position / round	First match	Last match
FA Cup	3rd round	Quarterfinal	4 January 1980	8 March 1980

4 January 1980 3rd round	Bristol Rovers	1–2	Aston Villa	Eastville
19:30 GMT		Report	Shaw (?); Cowans (?)	Stadium: Eastville Stadium; Attendance: 16,060

26 January 1980 4th round	Cambridge United	1–1	Aston Villa	Cambridge
15:00 GMT		Report	Donovan (?)	Stadium: Abbey Stadium; Attendance: 12,000

30 January 1980 4th round replay	Aston Villa	4–1	Cambridge United	Birmingham
19:30 GMT	Evans (?); Donovan (?); Little (?)	Report		Stadium: Villa Park; Attendance: 36,385

16 February 1980 5th round	Blackburn Rovers	1–1	Aston Villa	Blackburn
15:00 GMT		Report	Geddis (?)	Stadium: Ewood Park; Attendance: 29,468

8 March 1980 Quarter-finals	West Ham United	1–0	Aston Villa	Upton Park
15:00 GMT	Stewart (?)	Report		Stadium: Upton Park; Attendance: 36,393

== Squad ==
As of end of the season.

As of end of season

No.	Pos	Nat	Player	Total		First Division		FA Cup		League Cup	
No.	Pos	Nat	Player	Apps	Goals	Apps	Goals	Apps	Goals	Apps	Goals
	GK	(England) ENG	Jimmy Rimmer	51	0	41	0	6	0	4	0
	GK	(England) ENG	Nigel Spink	1	0	1	0	0	0	0	0
	DF	(England) ENG	Brendon Ormsby	25	0	21+2	0	1+1	0	0	0
	DF	(Scotland) SCO	Allan Evans	44	10	35	8	5	2	4	0
	DF	(Scotland) SCO	Ken McNaught	40	1	30	1	6	0	4	0
	DF	(England) ENG	Mark Jones	0	0	0	0	0	0	0	0
	DF	(Jamaica) JAM	Noel Blake	3	0	3	0	0	0	0	0
	DF	(Republic of Ireland) IRL	Eamonn Deacy	3	0	2+1	0	0	0	0	0
	DF	(England) ENG	Colin Gibson	40	2	30+1	2	6	0	3	0
	DF	(England) ENG	Mike Pejic	12	0	10	0	0	0	2	0
	DF	(England) ENG	Pat Heard	11	0	9	0	0	0	2	0
	DF	(England) ENG	Kenny Swain	50	0	41	0	5	0	4	0
	DF	(England) ENG	Gary Williams	2	0	1+1	0	0	0	0	0
	MF	(England) ENG	Ivor Linton	16	0	12+3	0	1	0	0	0
	MF	(England) ENG	Gary Shelton	5	0	4	0	0	0	0+1	0
	MF	(Scotland) SCO	Alex Cropley	1	0	1	0	0	0	0	0
	MF	(England) ENG	Lee Jenkins	1	0	0+1	0	0	0	0	0
	MF	(England) ENG	Dennis Mortimer	36	6	26	6	6	0	4	0
	MF	(Scotland) SCO	Des Bremner	44	3	36	3	6	0	2	0
	MF	(England) ENG	Gordon Cowans	52	7	42	6	6	1	4	0
	MF	(England) ENG	Terry Bullivant	7	0	6	0	1	0	0	0
	MF	(England) ENG	Tony Morley	20	3	15+3	3	0	0	2	0
	FW	(England) ENG	Gary Shaw	33	12	28	9	3	1	2	2
	FW	(England) ENG	Brian Little	37	6	29	5	6	1	2	0
	FW	(Republic of Ireland) IRL	Terry Donovan	15	5	9	2	6	3	0	0
	FW	(England) ENG	David Geddis	24	3	19+1	2	2	1	2	0
	FW	(Scotland) SCO	Joe Ward	2	0	1+1	0	0	0	0	0
	FW	(England) ENG	Robert Hopkins	2	1	0+2	1	0	0	0	0

Name	Nationality	Position (s)	Date of birth (age)	Signed from
Goalkeepers
Jimmy Rimmer	(England)	GK	10 February 1948 (aged 32)	(England) Arsenal
Nigel Spink	(England)	GK	8 August 1958 (aged 21)	(England) Chelmsford City
Defenders
Brendon Ormsby	(England)	CB	1 October 1960 (aged 19)	(England) Aston Villa Academy
Allan Evans	(Scotland)	CB	1 October 1960 (aged 19)	(Scotland) Dunfermline Athletic
Ken McNaught	(Scotland)	CB	11 January 1955 (aged 25)	(England) Everton
Mark Jones	(England)	RB	22 October 1961 (aged 18)	(England) Aston Villa Academy
Noel Blake	(Jamaica)	CB	12 January 1962 (aged 18)	(England) Aston Villa Academy
Eamonn Deacy	(Republic of Ireland)	LB	1 October 1958 (aged 21)	(Republic of Ireland) Galway United
Colin Gibson	(England)	LB	6 April 1960 (aged 20)	(England) Aston Villa Academy
Mike Pejic	(England)	LB	25 January 1950 (aged 30)	(England) Everton
Pat Heard	(England)	LB	17 March 1960 (aged 20)	(England) Everton
Kenny Swain	(England)	RB	28 January 1952 (aged 28)	(England) Chelsea
Gary Williams	(England)	RB	17 June 1960 (aged 19)	(England) Aston Villa Academy
Midfielders
Ivor Linton	(England)	MF	20 November 1959 (aged 20)	(England) Aston Villa Academy
Gary Shelton	(England)	MF	21 March 1958 (aged 22)	(England) Walsall
Alex Cropley	(Scotland)	MF	16 January 1951 (aged 29)	(Scotland) Hibernian
Lee Jenkins	(England)	MF	17 March 1961 (aged 19)	(England) Aston Villa Academy
Dennis Mortimer	(England)	CM	5 April 1952 (aged 28)	(England) Coventry City
Des Bremner	(Scotland)	CM	7 September 1952 (aged 27)	(Scotland) Hibernian
Gordon Cowans	(England)	CM	27 October 1958 (aged 21)	(England) Aston Villa Academy
Terry Bullivant	(England)	CM	23 September 1956 (aged 23)	(England) Fulham
Tony Morley	(England)	LW	26 August 1954 (aged 25)	(England) Burnley
Forwards
Gary Shaw	(England)	SS	21 January 1961 (aged 19)	(England) Aston Villa Academy
Brian Little	(England)	CF	25 November 1953 (aged 26)	(England) Aston Villa Academy
Terry Donovan	(Republic of Ireland)	CF	27 February 1958 (aged 22)	(England) Grimsby Town
David Geddis	(England)	CF	12 May 1958 (aged 21)	(England) Ipswich Town
Joe Ward	(Scotland)	CF	25 November 1954 (aged 25)	(Scotland) Clyde
Robert Hopkins	(England)	CF	25 October 1961 (aged 18)	(England) Aston Villa Academy

=== Transfers ===
In

Pos	Player	Transferred From	Fee	Date	Source
LW	(England) Tony Morley	(England) Burnley	£220,000	1 June 1979	
CF	(England) Terry Donovan	(England) Grimsby Town	£90,000	1 August 1979	
CM	(Scotland) Des Bremner	(Scotland) Hibernian	£275,000	1 September 1979	
LB	(England) Mike Pejic	(England) Everton	£225,000	1 September 1979	
CF	(England) David Geddis	(England) Ipswich Town	£300,000	1 September 1979	
LB	(England) Pat Heard	(England) Everton	£150,000	1 October 1979	
CM	(England) Terry Bullivant	(England) Fulham	£220,000	1 November 1979	

Out

Pos	Player	Transferred To	Fee	Date	Source
CM	(England) John Gregory	(England) Brighton & Hove Albion	£300,000	30 June 1979	
CM	(Scotland) Tommy Craig	(England) Swansea City	£150,000	30 June 1979	
CB	(England) Dave Evans	(England) Halifax Town	£22,000	30 June 1979	
CF	(England) John Deehan	(England) West Bromwich Albion	£500,000	1 September 1979	
CF	(Scotland) Andy Gray	(England) Wolverhampton Wanderers	£1,469,000	1 September 1979	
RB	(England) John Gidman	(England) Everton	£650,000	1 October 1979	
LW	(England) Frank Carrodus	(Wales) Wrexham	£70,000	1 December 1979	

=== Goalscorers ===
As of end of season.

Rnk	Pos	Player	First Division	FA Cup	League Cup	Total
1	FW	(England) Gary Shaw	9	1	2	12
2	DF	(Scotland) Allan Evans	10	0	0	10
3	MF	(England) Gordon Cowans	6	1	0	7
4	FW	(England) Brian Little	5	1	0	6
4	MF	(England) Dennis Mortimer	6	0	0	6
6	FW	(Republic of Ireland) Terry Donovan	2	3	0	5
7	MF	(Scotland) Des Bremner	3	0	0	3
7	FW	(England) David Geddis	3	0	0	3
7	MF	(England) Tony Morley	3	0	0	3
10	DF	(England) Colin Gibson	2	0	0	2
11	FW	(England) Robert Hopkins	1	0	0	1
11	DF	(Scotland) Ken McNaught	1	0	0	1
11	DF	(England) Kenny Swain	0	0	1	1
Own Goals			3	0	0	3
TOTALS			54	6	3	63

=== Clean sheets ===
As of end of season.

Rnk	Pos	Player	First Division	FA Cup	League Cup	Total
1	GK	(England) Jimmy Rimmer	12	2	2	16
TOTALS			12	2	2	16

=== Overall ===
As of end of season.

Games played	51 (42 First Division, 5 FA Cup, 4 Football League Cup)
Games won	19 (16 First Division, 2 FA Cup, 1 Football League Cup)
Games drawn	17 (14 First Division, 2 FA Cup, 1 Football League Cup)
Games lost	15 (12 First Division, 1 FA Cup, 2 Football League Cup)
Goals scored	62 (51 First Division, 8 FA Cup, 3 Football League Cup)
Goals conceded	61 (50 First Division, 5 FA Cup, 6 Football League Cup)
Goal difference	+1 (+1 First Division, +3 FA Cup, −3 Football League Cup)
Clean sheets	16 (12 First Division, 2 FA Cup, 2 Football League Cup)
Best result(s)	W 3–0 (H) v Southampton – First Division – 6 October 1979
Best result(s)	W 3–0 (H) v Coventry City – First Division – 19 December 1979
Best result(s)	W 4–1 (H) v Cambridge United – FA Cup – 30 January 1980
Worst result(s)	L 3–0 (H) v Manchester United – First Division – 8 September 1979
Worst result(s)	L 4–1 (A) v Everton – Football League Cup – 9 October 1979
Worst result(s)	L 4–1 (A) v Liverpool – First Division – 3 May 1980
Most appearances	(England) Gordon Cowans with 52 appearances
Top scorer(s)	(England) Gary Shaw (12 goals)
