= 1980–81 Aston Villa F.C. season =

English football club season

Aston Villa
1980–81 season
- Chairman: Ron Bendall
- Manager: Ron Saunders
- First Division: 1st (champions)
- FA Cup: Third round
- League Cup: Third round
- Top goalscorer: League: Peter Withe (20); All: Peter Withe (21)
- Highest home attendance: 47,998 vs West Bromwich Albion (8 April 1981)
- Lowest home attendance: 23,622 vs Leeds United (27 August 1980)
Home colours	Away colours

Second City Derby
- 37--28--24

The 1980–81 English football season was Aston Villa's 82nd season in the Football League. Villa competed in the First Division, their sixth consecutive season in the top division. They finished as league champions for the seventh time in their history, using just 14 players over the course of the campaign, of whom no fewer than seven were ever-present (Jimmy Rimmer, Kenny Swain, Ken McNaught, Dennis Mortimer, Des Bremner, Gordon Cowans and Tony Morley). Gary Shaw made 40 starts, Allan Evans 39 and Peter Withe, in his debut season, 36, with Gary Williams (21 starts) and Colin Gibson (19) contesting the remaining spot in the starting XI. David Geddis and Eamonn Deacy made eight and five starts respectively.

Villa began the season with three wins and a draw from their opening four league matches. They also beat Leeds United in both legs of the League Cup second round before their unbeaten start ended at Ipswich Town, who would prove to be Villa's main challengers for the title as the season progressed. Defeat at home to Everton was followed by a 12 match unbeaten run, and although Villa lost three of the next five, a further unbeaten run of 10 matches ensued, including seven straight wins. A key performance during this latter period was a second v first clash at home to Liverpool, who at the time headed the table on goal difference. Goals from Withe and Mortimer confirmed Villa as genuine contenders as they beat the reigning champions 2–0.

Ron Saunders' team were neck-and-neck with Ipswich when the two clashed at Villa Park in mid-April, and a 2–1 victory for the visitors appeared to swing the destiny of the championship in their favour. However, Ipswich lost their next two matches while Villa beat Nottingham Forest and drew with Stoke City to reclaim the initiative. Victory over Middlesbrough in their final home match left Villa four points ahead with one to play, although Ipswich had a game in hand and a superior goal difference.

At half-time on the final Saturday of the league season, Villa trailed 2–0 at Arsenal, and with Ipswich 1–0 ahead at Middlesbrough, the title was still hanging in the balance. No further goals were added in the second half at Highbury, but the home side scored twice without reply at Ayresome Park, as Boško Janković's goal confirmed Villa as champions for the first time since 1910.

Peter Withe ended the season as the First Division's joint leading scorer with 20 goals. Withe had previously won championship honours with Forest in 1978 and also played for Southport, Barrow, Wolverhampton Wanderers, Birmingham City and Newcastle United before joining Villa in the summer of 1980. During a five-year spell at Villa Park, he scored 74 goals in 182 League games and won 11 caps for England, scoring one goal. He later played for Sheffield United and Huddersfield Town.

== League ==
Pos	Team	Pld	W	D	L	GF	GA	GD	Pts	Qualification or relegation
1	Aston Villa (C)	42	26	8	8	72	40	+32	60	Qualification for the European Cup first round
2	Ipswich Town	42	23	10	9	77	43	+34	56	Qualification for the UEFA Cup first round
3	Arsenal	42	19	15	8	61	45	+16	53	Qualification for the UEFA Cup first round
4	West Bromwich Albion	42	20	12	10	60	42	+18	52	Qualification for the UEFA Cup first round
5	Liverpool	42	17	17	8	62	42	+20	51	Qualification for the European Cup first round (Note: Liverpool qualified for the European Cup first round as the 1980–81 European Cup winners.)
6	Southampton	42	20	10	12	76	56	+20	50	Qualification for the UEFA Cup first round
7	Nottingham Forest	42	19	12	11	62	44	+18	50	
8	Manchester United	42	15	18	9	51	36	+15	48	
9	Leeds United	42	17	10	15	39	47	−8	44	
10	Tottenham Hotspur	42	14	15	13	70	68	+2	43	Qualification for the European Cup Winners' Cup first round (Note: Tottenham Hotspur qualified for the European Cup Winners' Cup first round as the 1980–81 FA Cup winners.)
11	Stoke City	42	12	18	12	51	60	−9	42	
12	Manchester City	42	14	11	17	56	59	−3	39	
13	Birmingham City	42	13	12	17	50	61	−11	38	
14	Middlesbrough	42	16	5	21	53	61	−8	37	
15	Everton	42	13	10	19	55	58	−3	36	
16	Coventry City	42	13	10	19	48	68	−20	36	
17	Sunderland	42	14	7	21	52	53	−1	35	
18	Wolverhampton Wanderers	42	13	9	20	43	55	−12	35	
19	Brighton & Hove Albion	42	14	7	21	54	67	−13	35	
20	Norwich City (R)	42	13	7	22	49	73	−24	33	Relegation to the Second Division
21	Leicester City (R)	42	13	6	23	40	67	−27	32	Relegation to the Second Division
22	Crystal Palace (R)	42	6	7	29	47	83	−36	19	Relegation to the Second Division

Source: World Football
Rules for classification: 1) Points; 2) Goal difference; 3) Goals scored
(C) Champions; (R) Relegated

=== Matches ===
16 August 1980 1	Leeds United	1–2	Aston Villa	Leeds
	Stevenson 2' (pen.)		Morley 44'; Shaw 59'	Stadium: Elland Road; Attendance: 23,401
Note:

20 August 1980 2	Aston Villa	1–0	Norwich City	Birmingham
	Shaw 76'			Stadium: Villa Park; Attendance: 25,970

23 August 1980 3	Manchester City	2–2	Aston Villa	Manchester
	Tueart 83' (pen.); Ranson 88'		Withe 9' 76'	Stadium: Maine Road; Attendance: 30,017

30 August 1980 4	Aston Villa	1–0	Coventry City	Birmingham
	Shaw 65'			Stadium: Villa Park; Attendance: 26,050

6 September 1980 5	Ipswich Town	1–0	Aston Villa	Ipswich
	Thijssen 56'			Stadium: Portman Road; Attendance: 23,192

13 September 1980 6	Aston Villa	0–2	Everton	Birmingham
			Lyons 32'; Eastoe 36'	Stadium: Villa Park; Attendance: 25,673

20 September 1980 7	Aston Villa	2–1	Wolverhampton Wanderers	Birmingham
	Hughes 4' (o.g.); Geddis 84'		Eves 69'	Stadium: Villa Park; Attendance: 26,181

27 September 1980 8	Crystal Palace	0–1	Aston Villa	London
			Shaw 85'	Stadium: Selhurst Park; Attendance: 18,398

4 October 1980 9	Aston Villa	4–0	Sunderland	Birmingham
	Evans 45' 84'; Morley 59'; Shaw 76'			Stadium: Villa Park; Attendance: 26,914

8 October 1980 10	Manchester United	3–3	Aston Villa	Manchester
	McIlroy 35' (pen.) 57'; Coppell 36'		Withe 15'; Cowans 55' (pen.); Shaw 67'	Stadium: Old Trafford; Attendance: 38,831

11 October 1980 11	Birmingham City	1–2	Aston Villa	Birmingham
	Worthington 49' (pen.)		Cowans 35' (pen.); Evans 84'	Stadium: St Andrew's; Attendance: 33,879

18 October 1980 12	Aston Villa	3–0	Tottenham Hotspur	Birmingham
	Morley 39' 46'; Withe 82'			Stadium: Villa Park; Attendance: 30,940

22 October 1980 13	Aston Villa	4–1	Brighton & Hove Albion	Birmingham
	Mortimer 39'; Withe 47'; Bremner 55'; Shaw 60'		Gregory 27'	Stadium: Villa Park; Attendance: 27,367

25 October 1980 14	Southampton	1–2	Aston Villa	Southampton
	Moran 59'		Morley 13'; Withe 69'	Stadium: The Dell; Attendance: 21,249

1 November 1980 15	Aston Villa	2–0	Leicester City	Birmingham
	Shaw 65'; Cowans 69'			Stadium: Villa Park; Attendance: 29,953

8 November 1980 16	West Bromwich Albion	0–0	Aston Villa	West Bromwich
				Stadium: The Hawthorns; Attendance: 34,195

12 November 1980 17	Norwich City	1–3	Aston Villa	Norwich
	Paddon 25'		Shaw 61' 84'; Evans 86'	Stadium: Carrow Road; Attendance: 17,050

15 November 1980 18	Aston Villa	1–1	Leeds United	Birmingham
	Shaw 36'		Sabella 10'	Stadium: Villa Park; Attendance: 29,106

22 November 1980 19	Liverpool	2–1	Aston Villa	Liverpool
	Dalglish 65' 89'		Evans 78'	Stadium: Anfield; Attendance: 48,114

29 November 1980 20	Aston Villa	1–1	Arsenal	Birmingham
	Morley 57'		Talbot 73'	Stadium: Villa Park; Attendance: 30,140

6 December 1980 21	Middlesbrough	2–1	Aston Villa	Middlesbrough
	Johnston 84'; Shearer 88'		Shaw 86'	Stadium: Ayresome Park; Attendance: 15,597

13 December 1980 22	Aston Villa	3–0	Birmingham City	Birmingham
	Geddis 64' 83'; Shaw 77'			Stadium: Villa Park; Attendance: 41,101

20 December 1980 23	Brighton & Hove Albion	1–0	Aston Villa	Hove
	Robinson 15'			Stadium: Goldstone Ground; Attendance: 16,425

26 December 1980 24	Aston Villa	1–0	Stoke City	Birmingham
	Withe 38'			Stadium: Villa Park; Attendance: 34,658

27 December 1980 25	Nottingham Forest	2–2	Aston Villa	Nottingham
	Francis 41'; O'Neill 86'		Lloyd 16' (o.g.); Shaw 68'	Stadium: City Ground; Attendance: 33,930

10 January 1981 26	Aston Villa	2–0	Liverpool	Birmingham
	Withe 19'; Mortimer 82'			Stadium: Villa Park; Attendance: 47,960

17 January 1981 27	Coventry City	1–2	Aston Villa	Coventry
	Hateley 71'		Morley 55'; Withe 65'	Stadium: Highfield Road; Attendance: 27,020

31 January 1981 28	Aston Villa	1–0	Manchester City	Birmingham
	Shaw 2'			Stadium: Villa Park; Attendance: 33,682

7 February 1981 29	Everton	1–3	Aston Villa	Liverpool
	Ross 35' (pen.)		Morley 3'; Mortimer 42'; Cowans 71' (pen.)	Stadium: Goodison Park; Attendance: 31,434

21 February 1981 30	Aston Villa	2–1	Crystal Palace	Birmingham
	Withe 4' 70'		Hinshelwood 71'	Stadium: Villa Park; Attendance: 27,203

28 February 1981 31	Wolverhampton Wanderers	0–1	Aston Villa	Wolverhampton
			Withe 83'	Stadium: Molineux; Attendance: 34,693

7 March 1981 32	Sunderland	1–2	Aston Villa	Sunderland
	Hinnigan 68'		Evans 2'; Mortimer 19'	Stadium: Roker Park; Attendance: 27,278

14 March 1981 33	Aston Villa	3–3	Manchester United	Birmingham
	Withe 16' 28'; Shaw 68'		Jordan 46' 66'; McIlroy 88' (pen.)	Stadium: Villa Park; Attendance: 42,182

21 March 1981 34	Tottenham Hotspur	2–0	Aston Villa	London
	Crooks 41'; Archibald 73'			Stadium: White Hart Lane; Attendance: 35,091

23 March 1981 35	Aston Villa	2–1	Southampton	Birmingham
	Morley 43'; Geddis 45'		Evans 11' (o.g.)	Stadium: Villa Park; Attendance: 32,467

4 April 1981 36	Leicester City	2–4	Aston Villa	Leicester
	Lynex 15' (pen.) 44'		Withe 24' 49'; Bremner 33'; Morley 55'	Stadium: Filbert Street; Attendance: 26,032

8 April 1981 37	Aston Villa	1–0	West Bromwich Albion	Birmingham
	Withe 88'			Stadium: Villa Park; Attendance: 47,998

14 April 1981 38	Aston Villa	1–2	Ipswich Town	Birmingham
	Shaw 84'		Brazil 4'; Gates 79'	Stadium: Villa Park; Attendance: 47,495

18 April 1981 39	Aston Villa	2–0	Nottingham Forest	Birmingham
	Cowans 29' (pen.); Withe 45'			Stadium: Villa Park; Attendance: 34,707

20 April 1981 40	Stoke City	1–1	Aston Villa	Stoke-on-Trent
	O'Callaghan 25'		Withe 22'	Stadium: Victoria Ground; Attendance: 23,511

25 April 1981 41	Aston Villa	3–0	Middlesbrough	Birmingham
	Shaw 23'; Withe 51'; Evans 80'			Stadium: Villa Park; Attendance: 38,018

2 May 1981 42	Arsenal	2–0	Aston Villa	London
	Young 12'; McDermott 44'			Stadium: Highbury; Attendance: 57,472

== League Cup ==
27 August 1980 R2, 1st Leg	Aston Villa	1–0	Leeds United	Birmingham
	Morley 9'			Stadium: Villa Park; Attendance: 23,622

3 September 1980 R2, 2nd Leg	Leeds United	1–3	Aston Villa	Leeds
	Graham 13'		Withe 6'; Shaw 45' 72'	Stadium: Elland Road; Attendance: 12,236

23 September 1980 R3	Cambridge United	2–1	Aston Villa	Cambridge
	Finney 8'; Spriggs 17'		Morley 6'	Stadium: Abbey Stadium; Attendance: 7,608

== FA Cup ==
3 January 1981 R3	Ipswich Town	1–0	Aston Villa	Ipswich
	Mariner 12'			Stadium: Portman Road; Attendance: 27,721

== Squad ==
Substitute appearances indicated in brackets

Pos.	Nat.	Name	League		League Cup		FA Cup		Total	
Pos.	Nat.	Name	Apps	Goals	Apps	Goals	Apps	Goals	Apps	Goals
GK	ENG	Mark Kendall	0	0	0	0	0	0	0	0
GK	ENG	Jimmy Rimmer	42	0	3	0	1	0	46	0
GK	ENG	Nigel Spink	0	0	0	0	0	0	0	0
DF	JAM	Noel Blake	0	0	0	0	0	0	0	0
DF	IRE	Eamonn Deacy	5(4)	0	0(1)	0	0	0	5(5)	0
DF	SCO	Allan Evans	39	7	3	0	1	0	43	7
DF	ENG	Colin Gibson	19(2)	0	3	0	0	0	22(2)	0
DF	ENG	Mark Jones	0	0	0	0	0	0	0	0
DF	SCO	Ken McNaught	42	0	3	0	1	0	46	0
DF	ENG	David Mail	0	0	0	0	0	0	0	0
DF	ENG	Brendan Ormsby	0	0	0	0	0	0	0	0
DF	ENG	Mike Pejic	0	0	0	0	0	0	0	0
DF	ENG	Kenny Swain	42	0	3	0	1	0	46	0
DF	ENG	Gary Williams	21(1)	0	0	0	1	0	22(1)	0
MF	ENG	Paul Birch	0	0	0	0	0	0	0	0
MF	SCO	Des Bremner	42	2	3	0	1	0	46	2
MF	ENG	Terry Bullivant	0	0	0	0	0	0	0	0
MF	ENG	Gordon Cowans	42	5	3	0	1	0	46	5
MF	SCO	Alex Cropley	0	0	0	0	0	0	0	0
MF	ENG	Pat Heard	0	0	0	0	0	0	0	0
MF	ENG	Robert Hopkins	0	0	0	0	0	0	0	0
MF	ENG	Ivor Linton	0	0	0	0	0	0	0	0
MF	ENG	Dennis Mortimer	42	4	3	0	1	0	46	4
MF	ENG	Gary Shelton	0	0	0	0	0	0	0	0
MF	ENG	Gary Stirland	0	0	0	0	0	0	0	0
FW	IRE	Terry Donovan	0	0	0	0	0	0	0	0
FW	ENG	David Geddis	8(1)	4	1	0	0(1)	0	9(2)	4
FW	ENG	Brian Little	0	0	0	0	0	0	0	0
FW	ENG	Tony Morley	42	10	3	2	1	0	46	12
FW	ENG	Kevin Ready	0	0	0	0	0	0	0	0
FW	ENG	Gary Shaw	40	18	2(1)	2	1	0	43(1)	20
FW	ENG	Peter Withe	36	20	3	1	1	0	40	21
FW	SCO	Willie Young	0	0	0	0	0	0	0	0

== See also ==
- List of Aston Villa F.C. records and statistics
