= 1978–79 Aston Villa F.C. season =

English football club season

Aston Villa
1978–79 season
- Chairman: Harry Kartz
- Manager: Ron Saunders
- Stadium: Villa Park
- First Division: 8th
- FA Cup: Third round
- League Cup: Fourth round

Second City Derby
- 35--28--24

The 1978–79 English football season was Aston Villa's 80th season in the Football League and their fourth consecutive season in the top division. Manager, Ron Saunders had signed a six-year contract in the pre-season.

There were debut appearances for Gary Williams (324), Colin J Gibson (185), Gary Shaw (165), Kenny Swain (148), Brendan Ormsby (117), Gary Shelton (24), Lee Jenkins (3), Joe Ward (3) and Willie Young.

Villa won both games in the Second City derby.

== League table ==
| Pos | Team | Pld | W | D | L | GF | GA | GD | Pts | Qualification or relegation |
|---|---|---|---|---|---|---|---|---|---|---|
| 6 | Ipswich Town | 42 | 20 | 9 | 13 | 63 | 49 | +14 | 49 | Qualification for the UEFA Cup first round |
| 7 | Arsenal | 42 | 17 | 14 | 11 | 61 | 48 | +13 | 48 | Qualification for the European Cup Winners' Cup first round (Note: Arsenal qualified for the European Cup Winners' Cup first round as the 1978–79 FA Cup winners.) |
| 8 | Aston Villa | 42 | 15 | 16 | 11 | 59 | 49 | +10 | 46 | |
| 9 | Manchester United | 42 | 15 | 15 | 12 | 60 | 63 | −3 | 45 | |
| 10 | Coventry City | 42 | 14 | 16 | 12 | 58 | 68 | −10 | 44 | |

Source: World Football
Rules for classification: 1) Points; 2) Goal difference; 3) Goals scored

=== Matches ===
| 19 August 1978 | Aston Villa | 1–0 | Wolverhampton Wanderers | Villa Park |
| | Andy Gray, 60 | Report |
Note: The First Division season begins with a 1–0 home victory over Wolves. Gary Shelton starts for Villa making his debut.

| 23 August 1978 | Tottenham Hotspur | 1–4 | Aston Villa |
| | | Report | Allan Evans, 35; John Gregory, 49; Brian Little, 80; Gary Shelton, 86 |

| 26 August 1978 | Bristol City | 1–0 | Aston Villa |
| | | Report |

| 2 September 1978 | Aston Villa | 1–1 | Southampton | Villa Park |
| | Andy Gray, 23 | Report |

| 9 September 1978 | Ipswich Town | 0–2 | Aston Villa |
| | | Report | John Gregory, 17; Andy Gray, 90 (pen) |

| 16 September 1978 | Aston Villa | 1–1 | Everton | Villa Park |
| | Tommy Craig, 42 | Report |

| 23 September 1978 | Queens Park Rangers | 1–0 | Aston Villa |
| | | Report |

| 30 September 1978 | Aston Villa | 1–2 | Nottingham Forest | Villa Park |
| | Tommy Craig, 20 (pen) | Report |

| 7 October 1978 | Arsenal | 1–1 | Aston Villa |
| | | Report | John Gregory, 84 |

| 14 October 1978 | Aston Villa | 2–2 | Manchester United | Villa Park |
| | John Gregory, 32, 45 | Report |

| 21 October 1978 | Birmingham City | 0–1 | Aston Villa |
| | | Report | Andy Gray, 8 |

| 27 October 1978 | Aston Villa | 0–2 | Middlesbrough | Villa Park |
| | | Report |

| 4 November 1978 | Aston Villa | 1–1 | Manchester City | Villa Park |
| | John Deehan, 62 | Report |

| 11 November 1978 | Wolverhampton Wanderers | 0–4 | Aston Villa |
| | | Report | Gary Shelton, 39; Ken McNaught, 43; John Deehan, 81; Dennis Mortimer, 85 |

| 18 November 1978 | Aston Villa | 2–0 | Bristol City | Villa Park |
| | John Deehan, 59; Gordon Cowans, 70 | Report |

| 21 November 1978 | Southampton | 2–0 | Aston Villa |
| | | Report |

| 25 November 1978 | West Bromwich Albion | 1–1 | Aston Villa |
| | | Report | Allan Evans, 64 |

| 9 December 1978 | Chelsea | 0–1 | Aston Villa |
| | | Report | Allan Evans, 15 |

| 16 December 1978 | Aston Villa | 1–1 | Norwich City | Villa Park |
| | Own Goal, 79 | Report |

| 23 December 1978 | Derby County | 0–0 | Aston Villa |
| | | Report |

| 26 December 1978 | Aston Villa | 2–2 | Leeds United | Villa Park |
| | John Gregory, 21, 26 | Report |

| 31 January 1979 | Everton | 1–1 | Aston Villa |
| | | Report | Gary Shelton, 49 |

| 24 February 1979 | Manchester United | 1–1 | Aston Villa |
| | | Report | Kenny Swain, 58 |

| 3 March 1979 | Aston Villa | 1–0 | Birmingham City | Villa Park |
| | Gordon Cowans, 80 | Report |

| 7 March 1979 | Aston Villa | 3–0 | Bolton Wanderers | Villa Park |
| | Andy Gray, 17; Kenny Swain, 30; Own Goal, 45 | Report |

| 10 March 1979 | Middlesbrough | 2–0 | Aston Villa |
| | | Report |

| 20 March 1979 | Aston Villa | 3–1 | Queens Park Rangers | Villa Park |
| | Allan Evans, 34; John Gidman, 72 (pen); Dennis Mortimer, 89 | Report |

| 24 March 1979 | Aston Villa | 2–3 | Tottenham Hotspur | Villa Park |
| | John Gidman, 39 (pen); Andy Gray, 44 | Report |

| 28 March 1979 | Aston Villa | 1–1 | Coventry City | Villa Park |
| | Allan Evans, 49 | Report |

| 4 April 1979 | Nottingham Forest | 4–0 | Aston Villa |
| | | Report |

| 7 April 1979 | Coventry City | 1–1 | Aston Villa |
| | | Report | John Deehan, 77 |

| 11 April 1979 | Aston Villa | 3–3 | Derby County | Villa Park |
| | Gordon Cowans, 26, 55; John Gidman, 51 (pen) | Report |

| 14 April 1979 | Leeds United | 1–0 | Aston Villa |
| | | Report |

| 16 April 1979 | Aston Villa | 3–1 | Liverpool | Villa Park |
| | Allan Evans, 33; Own Goal, 41; John Deehan, 84 | Report |

| 21 April 1979 | Norwich City | 1–2 | Aston Villa |
| | | Report | Gary Shelton, 13; Alex Cropley, 72 |

| 25 April 1979 | Aston Villa | 5–1 | Arsenal | Villa Park |
| | Gary Shelton, 49, 51, 85 (pen); John Deehan, 69, 73 | Report |

| 28 April 1979 | Aston Villa | 2–1 | Chelsea | Villa Park |
| | Own Goal, 68; Kenny Swain, 82 | Report |

| 2 May 1979 | Aston Villa | 2–2 | Ipswich Town | Villa Park |
| | Kenny Swain, 8; John Deehan, 13 | Report |

| 5 May 1979 | Bolton Wanderers | 0–0 | Aston Villa |
| | | Report |

| 8 May 1979 | Liverpool | 3–0 | Aston Villa | Anfield |
| | | Report |
Note: Liverpool beat Aston Villa 3–0 at Anfield to clinch the First Division title.

| 11 May 1979 | Aston Villa | 0–1 | West Bromwich Albion | Villa Park |
| | | Report |

| 15 May 1979 | Manchester City | 2–3 | Aston Villa |
| | | Report | Alex Cropley, 50; Dennis Mortimer, 72; John Deehan, 75 |
Note:

Source: avfchistory.co.uk

== FA Cup ==
Teams from the Football League First and Second Division entered in the Third round. The third round of games in the FA Cup were intended to be played on 6 January 1979, but only four games were actually played on this date. Twenty more ties were played midweek over 8–10 January with a few more taking place on 15–16 and one on 18 January. Replays were intended for 9–10 January but again took place at various times. One tie, between Wrexham and Stockport County, suffered six postponements before finally being played on 1 February, by which time Arsenal and Sheffield Wednesday had played five times, the tie needing a fourth replay before being settled. Maidstone United and Altrincham were the last non-league clubs left in the competition.

| Tie no | Home team | Score | Away team | Date |
|---|---|---|---|---|
| 6 | Nottingham Forest | 2–0 | Aston Villa | 10 January 1979 |

== League Cup ==
=== Second round ===
| Home team | Score | Away team | Date |
|---|---|---|---|
| Aston Villa (1) | 1–0 | Sheffield Wednesday (3) | 30 August 1978 |

=== Third round ===
| Home team | Score | Away team | Date |
|---|---|---|---|
| Aston Villa | 1–1 | Crystal Palace | 4 October 1978 |

Replay

| Home team | Score | Away team | Date |
|---|---|---|---|
| Crystal Palace | 0–0 | Aston Villa | 10 October 1978 |

2nd Replay

| Home team | Score | Away team | Date |
|---|---|---|---|
| Aston Villa | 3–0 | Crystal Palace | 16 October 1978 |

=== Fourth round ===
| Home team | Score | Away team | Date |
|---|---|---|---|
| Aston Villa | 0–2 | Luton Town | 8 November 1978 |

== Squad ==
All Aston Villa players: 1979 Note: Flags indicate national team as defined under FIFA eligibility rules; some limited exceptions apply. Players may hold more than one non-FIFA nationality.

| Pos. | Nation | Player |
|---|---|---|
| GK | ENG | Jimmy Rimmer |
| DF | ENG | John Gidman |
| DF | ENG | John Gregory |
| DF | SCO | Allan Evans |
| DF | SCO | Ken McNaught |
| MF | ENG | Dennis Mortimer |
| FW | SCO | Tommy Craig |
| FW | ENG | Brian Little |
| FW | ENG | John Deehan |
| MF | ENG | Gordon Cowans |
| MF | ENG | Kenny Swain |
| DF | ENG | Gary Williams |
| MF | ENG | Gary Shelton |

| Pos. | Nation | Player |
|---|---|---|
| MF | SCO | Alex Cropley |
| FW | SCO | Andy Gray |
| DF | ENG | Colin Gibson |
| MF | ENG | Frank Carrodus |
| DF | ENG | Ivor Linton |
| DF | SCO | Gordon Smith |
| DF | WAL | Leighton Phillips |
| FW | ENG | Gary Shaw |
| MF | SCO | Willie Young |
| DF | ENG | Dave Evans |
| DF | ENG | Brendan Ormsby |
| FW | SCO | Joe Ward |
| MF | ENG | Lee Jenkins |
