= Pat Heard =

English footballer

- Pat Heard at Villa Park, 16 March 2013

Personal information
- Full name: Timothy Patrick Heard
- Date of birth: 17 March 1960
- Place of birth: Hull, England
- Height: 5 ft 10 in (1.78 m)
- Positions: Defender; midfielder

Senior career*
| Years | Team | Apps | (Gls) |
| 1978–1979 | Everton | 11 | (0) |
| 1979–1983 | Aston Villa | 24 | (2) |
| 1983–1984 | Sheffield Wednesday | 25 | (3) |
| 1984–1985 | Newcastle United | 34 | (2) |
| 1985–1986 | Middlesbrough | 25 | (2) |
| 1986–1988 | Hull City | 80 | (5) |
| 1988–1990 | Rotherham United | 44 | (7) |
| 1990–1992 | Cardiff City | 46 | (4) |
| 1992–1993 | Hull City | 3 | (1) |
| 1993–1994 | Brunei | 1 | (0) |
| Total | | 293 | (26) |

International career
| 1978 | England Youth | 1 | (0) |
- * Club domestic league appearances and goals

Timothy Patrick Heard (born 17 March 1960) is an English former footballer, notably a midfielder and left-back. He was a member of the Aston Villa team that won the 1981-82 European Cup.

In the mid-70s, Heard attended Malet Lambert High School and played for Hull City Schoolboys and Humberside Boys. While on Humberside, Heard was spotted by Jeff Barmby, who tipped off Everton reserve-team manager Ray Henderson.

== Professional football career ==
A product of the youth system at Everton, left-footer Heard made eleven appearances for the club, debuting against Wolverhampton Wanderers in February 1979 and playing in the Merseyside derby.

In October 1979, the 19-year-old midfielder was signed by Aston Villa at a valuation of £150,000 (2015: £530,000) in an exchange for John Gidman. Heard made his Villa debut on 26 March 1980, in a 2-0 home win against Norwich. He made nine appearances in his first season at Villa Park, but was not one of just 14 players used by Ron Saunders to become League champions the following season. He scored a goal during a 4–3 defeat to Arsenal at Highbury in March 1982 and scored the winner in a 1–0 victory away to local rivals West Bromwich Albion in May that year.

Heard won a European Cup medal after being named as a substitute for the 1982 European Cup Final. Only a single substitution was allowed, and Heard's opportunity to play was dashed within nine minutes following the substitute goalkeeper, Nigel Spink, replacing injured Jimmy Rimmer. At the time, Heard was a neighbour to future Villa manager, eleven-year-old Dean Smith. Smith was not allowed to go to the final, but Pat made sure that the young boy was on the team bus as it paraded the trophy through Birmingham. When appointed manager, Smith picked out Heard as an inspiration.

The following European Cup season, Heard played for the defending European champions in the 3–1 victory over Beşiktaş J.K. The tie was played behind closed doors due to crowd trouble against Anderlecht in the previous season's semi-final in Brussels.

Heard left Villa in January 1983 for Sheffield Wednesday, priced at £60,000; his new club's hopes of promotion from the Second Division had been dented by a recent slump in form. He was forced to take a taxi to Highbury for the 1983 FA Cup semi-final, having been accidentally left behind by manager Jack Charlton. When Charlton moved to Newcastle United, Heard was the new manager's first signing. In October 1984 he scored in a 3–0 victory over Ipswich Town; his second goal came the following month in a 2–2 draw away to Luton.

In August 1985, Heard moved to Middlesbrough on a month's loan with a view to a permanent deal. In November 1985, he scored as Middlesbrough beat Shrewsbury Town 3–1 at home.

Following his spell at Middlesbrough, in 1986 Heard joined his hometown club Hull City. Notable performances included scoring a penalty in the 2–1 victory over his old club, Villa, in August 1987. As penalty taker, he also scored in a 3–0 away win at Barnsley in October 1987 and the 2–1 away win at Oldham Athletic in the Christmas fixtures that year. When Heard's son, Jamie, played for the Tigers in an Associate Members Cup tie against Port Vale on 22 October 2002, they became the first father and son to represent Hull City.

Having been a first-teamer for two seasons at Hull, Heard left to play for Rotherham United, winning the Fourth Division title. This was followed by two years at Cardiff City, during which time he turned down an offer from Norwegian club Randaberg IL to become their player-manager. Heard appeared 46 times in the Fourth Division. His four goals contributed to Cardiff's 13th and 9th finishing positions.

In 1992, Heard returned briefly to Hull switching with Hall Road Rangers, before continuing his career with the Brunei M-League Team, under Mick Lyons, in the Malaysian League. A clash of heads fractured his skull ending his playing career at the age of 34.

== After football ==
After football, Heard was landlord of the Three Tuns, Boothferry Road. After several years, he embarked on a variety of careers including as a publican in both Hull and Chesterfield, a summariser for Free Radio Birmingham, a stage hypnotist. As an Approved Driving Instructor, Heard taught Villa Academy players such as Barry Bannan, Benji Siegrist and Andreas Weimann to drive.

== Honours ==
Rotherham United

- Football League Fourth Division: 1988–89
