= Colin Gibson (footballer, born 1960) =

English footballer (born 1960)

Personal information
- Full name: Colin John Gibson
- Date of birth: 6 April 1960 (age 66)
- Place of birth: Bridport, England
- Height: 5 ft 8 in (1.73 m)
- Positions: Left-back; midfielder

Youth career
- 1976–1978: Aston Villa

Senior career*
Years	Team	Apps	(Gls)
1978–1985	Aston Villa	185	(10)
1985–1990	Manchester United	79	(9)
1990	→ Port Vale (loan)	6	(2)
1990–1994	Leicester City	59	(4)
1994	Blackpool	2	(0)
1994–1995	Walsall	33	(0)
Total		364	(25)

International career
1981	England U21	1	(0)
1984	England B	1	(0)
- * Club domestic league appearances and goals

Colin John Gibson (born 6 April 1960) is an English former footballer. He was an attacking left back who could also play in midfield. In a 17-year career, he scored 34 goals in 448 league and cup appearances and also won caps for the England under-21 and England B teams.

Gibson started his career at Aston Villa in 1978 and made around 200 appearances for the club in seven years, as well as winning the First Division title and the European Cup. He played in the Villa team that beat Barcelona 3–0 at Villa Park to win the 1982 European Super Cup.

He moved on to Manchester United in 1985, and during his five years at United, he played 79 league games. He signed with Leicester City in 1990, after a short loan at Port Vale. After four years with the "Foxes" in which he helped the club to win promotion to the Premier League via the play-offs in 1994, he transferred to Blackpool, before finishing his career by winning promotion out of the Third Division with Walsall in 1995.

== Club career ==
=== Aston Villa ===
Born in Bridport, Dorset, Gibson started his career as a YTS apprentice at Aston Villa in July 1976, and turned professional after he played in the 1978 FA Youth Cup defeat to Crystal Palace. After making his debut against Bristol City on 18 November 1978, he broke into the first-team in a Ron Saunders side narrowly missing out on European qualification in 1978–79 and 1979–80. He faced competition from Gary Williams, Mike Pejic, and Eamonn Deacy for the left-back spot. He went on to make 21 appearances in the 1980–81 season, as the "Villans" were crowned First Division champions. He then played at Wembley in the 1981 FA Charity Shield, as Villa shared the trophy after a 2–2 draw with Tottenham Hotspur. In the 1981–82 campaign, he featured in both legs of the European Cup wins over Icelanders Valur and German side Berliner FC Dynamo, but remained on the bench for the 1982 European Cup final victory over Bayern Munich at De Kuip. He took the trophy out on a night of drinking with Gordon Cowans and lost it before it was returned to him the following day by police officers.

Gibson featured in both legs of Villa's 1982 European Super Cup victory over Barcelona, as Villa overturned a 1–0 defeat at the Camp Nou to claim an extra time victory at Villa Park. Tony Barton's side went on to reach the quarter-finals of the European Cup in 1982–83, where they were knocked out by a Juventus side fronted by Michel Platini. This was the end of the club's glory years, as they could only manage tenth-place league finishes in 1983–84 and 1984–85. Villa manager Graham Turner allowed Gibson to be transferred to Manchester United in November 1985 for a fee of £275,000.

=== Manchester United ===
Gibson scored five goals in 22 games in the 1985–86 campaign, scoring his first goal for United in a 1–0 New Year's Day victory over Birmingham City at Old Trafford. He also scored goals against Manchester City at home and Liverpool at Anfield, earning United a draw on both occasions. He played 26 games in the 1986–87 season, as an under-performing United side cost manager Ron Atkinson his job. Gibson made 33 starts in the 1987–88 season, as the "Red Devils" finished second in the league behind Liverpool. After the season ended he was rarely involved in first-team games due to manager Alex Ferguson's decision to field Lee Martin as left-back. He was also beset with injury problems, which kept him out of action for protracted periods. He played three first-team games in the entire 1988–89 season. By the end of the 1989–90 season, he was fit and had appeared in the first FA Cup semi-final against Oldham Athletic.

In September 1990, he joined Second Division club Port Vale on loan, scoring on his debut at left-back in a 3–2 defeat by Hull City at Boothferry Park on 29 September. He left Vale Park and returned to Manchester the next month after a further five games for John Rudge's "Valiants".

=== Leicester City ===
He left United for David Pleat's Leicester City in December 1990 for £100,000. He did well at Filbert Street, helping the "Foxes" to avoid relegation from the Second Division in 1990–91 under caretaker manager Gordon Lee. He then played his part in the revival under new manager Brian Little. City finished fourth in 1991–92, before losing 1–0 to Blackburn Rovers in the play-off final. They again suffered heartbreak in 1992–93, reaching the play-off final again, only to lose 4–3 to Swindon Town (Gibson was an unused substitute). A third consecutive play-off final appearance came at the end of the 1993–94 campaign, and this time Leicester won promotion with a 2–1 victory over Derby County as Gibson played the game as a central midfielder. During his time at City he became the first substitute to be substituted, and the first substitute to be sent off.

=== Blackpool to Walsall ===
Gibson never featured for Leicester in the Premier League, however, and instead signed for Blackpool. He played just two Second Division games for Sam Allardyce's "Seasiders" at the start of the 1994–95 season, before departing Bloomfield Road for Third Division club Walsall. He played 33 league games to help Chris Nicholl's "Saddlers" to win promotion as the division's runners-up in 1994–95. He then departed the Bescot Stadium and retired from the Football League.

== International career ==
Gibson won one cap for the England under-21s on 8 September 1981, in a 0–0 draw with Norway. He also won one cap for the England B team on 13 November 1984, in a 2–0 win over New Zealand at the City Ground.

== Career statistics ==
Appearances and goals by club, season and competition
Club	Season	League			FA Cup		Other		Total	
Club	Season	Division	Apps	Goals	Apps	Goals	Apps	Goals	Apps	Goals
Aston Villa	1978–79	First Division	12	0	0	0	0	0	12	0
Aston Villa	1979–80	First Division	31	2	6	0	3	0	40	2
Aston Villa	1980–81	First Division	21	0	0	0	3	0	24	0
Aston Villa	1981–82	First Division	23	0	2	0	11	0	36	0
Aston Villa	1982–83	First Division	23	1	3	1	7	0	33	2
Aston Villa	1983–84	First Division	28	1	0	0	11	4	39	5
Aston Villa	1984–85	First Division	40	4	1	0	3	2	44	6
Aston Villa	1985–86	First Division	7	2	0	0	3	0	10	2
Aston Villa	Total		185	10	12	1	41	6	238	17
Manchester United	1985–86	First Division	18	5	4	0	2	1	24	6
Manchester United	1986–87	First Division	24	1	1	0	1	0	26	1
Manchester United	1987–88	First Division	29	2	2	0	5	0	36	2
Manchester United	1988–89	First Division	2	0	0	0	1	0	3	0
Manchester United	1989–90	First Division	6	1	2	0	0	0	8	1
Manchester United	Total		79	9	9	0	9	1	97	10
Port Vale (loan)	1990–91	Second Division	6	2	0	0	0	0	6	2
Leicester City	1990–91	Second Division	18	1	1	0	0	0	19	0
Leicester City	1991–92	Second Division	17	3	0	0	6	0	23	3
Leicester City	1992–93	Second Division	9	0	1	0	2	0	12	0
Leicester City	1993–94	Second Division	15	0	0	0	4	0	19	0
Leicester City	Total		59	4	2	0	12	0	73	4
Blackpool	1994–95	Second Division	2	0	0	0	2	0	4	0
Walsall	1994–95	Third Division	33	0	5	0	2	1	40	1
Career total			364	25	28	1	66	8	458	34

== Honours ==
Aston Villa

- Football League First Division: 1980–81
- FA Charity Shield: 1981 (shared)
- European Cup: 1981–82
- European Super Cup: 1982
- FA Youth Cup runner-up: 1978

Leicester City

- Football League First Division play-offs: 1994

Walsall

- Football League Third Division second-place promotion: 1994–95
