= Lee Jenkins =

Lee Jenkins may refer to:

- Lee Jenkins (footballer, born 1961), English footballer for Aston Villa, Port Vale and Birmingham City
- Lee Jenkins (footballer, born 1979), Welsh footballer for Swansea City
- Lee Jenkins (footballer, born 2001), Welsh footballer for Newport County
