= Gary Williams (footballer, born 1960) =

English footballer

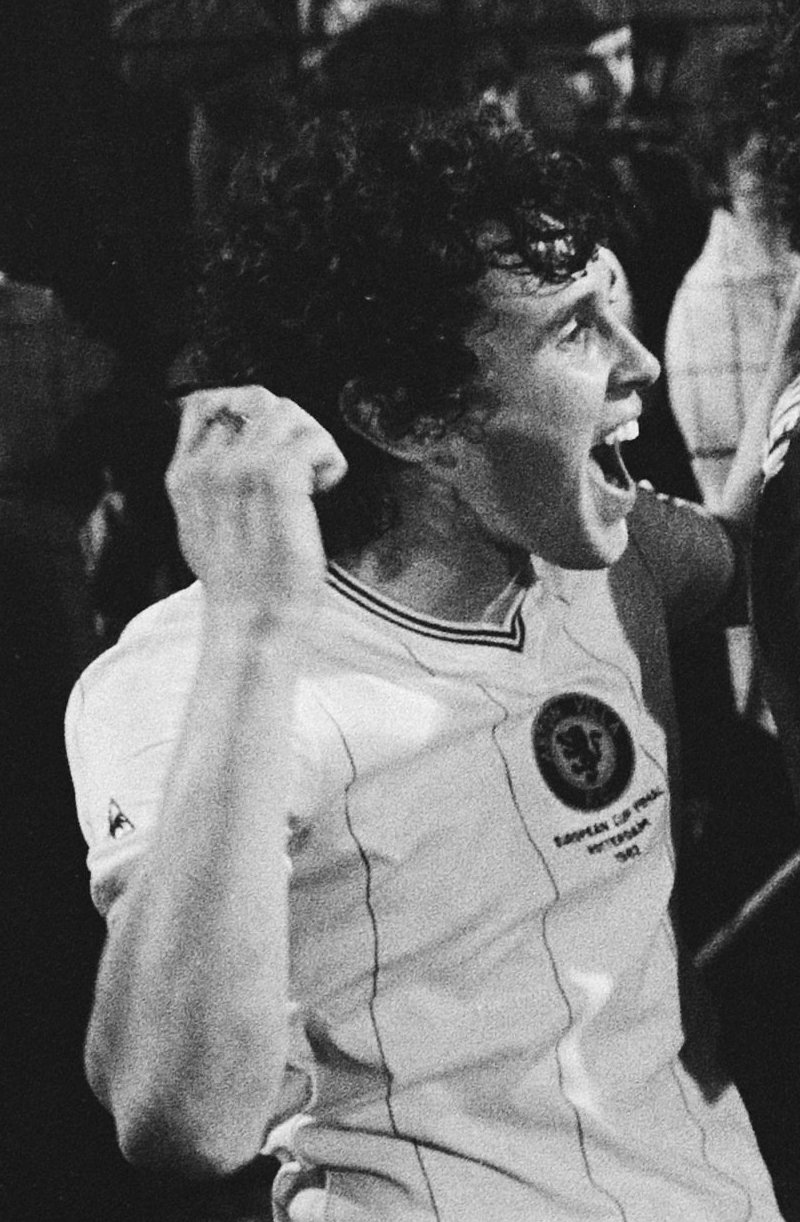
- Williams in 1982

Personal information
- Date of birth: 17 June 1960 (age 66)
- Place of birth: Wolverhampton, England
- Height: 5 ft 9 in (1.75 m)
- Position: Left-back

Youth career
- 1975–1978: Aston Villa

Senior career*
Years	Team	Apps	(Gls)
1978–1987	Aston Villa	324	(0)
1979	→ Walsall (loan)	9	(0)
1987–1990	Leeds United	39	(3)
1990–1991	Watford	42	(0)
1991–1994	Bradford City	85	(5)
Total		415	(8)
- * Club domestic league appearances and goals

Gary Williams (born 17 June 1960, Wolverhampton) is a former professional footballer who played as a left-back. He played for Aston Villa and was part of their European Cup victory in 1982.

Joining Villa as a schoolboy, he lodged with Brendan Ormsby, Colin Gibson and Gordon Cowans. Williams signed as a YTS apprentice at sixteen in July 1976. First added to the squad in early the 1977-78 season, the 18-year-old made his debut on 16 September 1978, in a 1-1 draw against Everton at home. He made two first team appearances in the 79–80 season and 9 loan appearances for Walsall.

Contesting with Gibson for the left-back position, Gary Williams was one of just 14 players used by Ron Saunders to become League champions the following season. He played in the 1982 European Cup final. His pass upfield started the play that ended with Peter Withe's goal. He played in the Aston Villa team that beat Barcelona 3–0 at Villa Park to win the 1982 European Super Cup.

The 26-year-old made his final appearance on 4 May 1987 under Billy McNeill, in a 1-2 at home defeat to Sheffield Wednesday after Villa had been relegated. He joined Leeds United, also in the Second Division.

Williams also played for Watford and Bradford City.

== Honours ==
Aston Villa

- Football League First Division: 1980–81
- FA Charity Shield: 1981 (shared)
- European Cup: 1981–82
- European Super Cup: 1982
- Intercontinental Cup runner-up: 1982
