= Paul Birch (footballer, born 1962) =

English footballer

Personal information
- Full name: Paul Birch
- Date of birth: 6 November 1962
- Place of birth: West Bromwich, England
- Date of death: 2 February 2009 (aged 46)
- Place of death: Sutton Coldfield, England
- Height: 5 ft 8 in (1.73 m)
- Position: Midfielder

Youth career
- Aston Villa

Senior career*
Years	Team	Apps	(Gls)
1980–1991	Aston Villa	173	(16)
1991–1996	Wolverhampton Wanderers	142	(14)
1996	→ Preston North End (loan)	11	(2)
1996–1997	Doncaster Rovers	27	(2)
1997–1998	Exeter City	37	(5)
1998–2000	Halesowen Town	63	(?)
- * Club domestic league appearances and goals

Paul Birch (6 November 1962 – 2 February 2009) was an English footballer who played as a midfielder, making nearly 400 appearances in the Football League – more than 300 of which were for Aston Villa and Wolverhampton Wanderers – during the 1980s and 1990s.

== Career ==
Birch began his career in the Aston Villa youth system, becoming a regular first-team player in 1983/84 season after making his league debut on 29 August 1983 in a 1–0 win at home to Sunderland. His first-team debut had come earlier that year when he replaced Gary Shaw for the final twelve minutes of the European Super Cup victory at home to Barcelona. He had not featured in Villa's title-winning team of 1981 nor the European Cup winning side of 1982.

During Villa's decline he was the mainstay of their midfield – able to play on the right or in the centre – and through his tenacious performances became a Holte End favourite. He was part of the Villa side that were relegated under Billy McNeill in 1987, but helped them win promotion under new manager Graham Taylor a year later. He came close to winning a league title medal in 1990, but Villa were beaten into second place by Liverpool.

However, when Jozef Vengloš became Villa manager at the start of the 1990–91, Birch found himself out of the team and was sold to second flight team Wolverhampton Wanderers in January 1991 for £400,000 where he joined up with former manager Graham Turner (who had been at Villa Park from 1984 to 1986). He had served Aston Villa for over 10 years and was awarded a testimonial by the club (against his new side) in August 1991.

Birch stayed at Wolves for five years as the club (unsuccessfully) tried to break into the Premier League. He was almost an ever-present under Turner, but found regular appearances harder to come by after Wolves appointed another former manager of his, Graham Taylor.

He was finally released by Wolves in May 1996, whereupon he finished his career with a season at both Doncaster Rovers and Exeter City before retiring from professional football and joining Halesowen Town in the Southern Premier League.

He had a spell as a postman before joining the coaching staff at Forest Green Rovers in 2001, working under his former Villa teammate Nigel Spink and remained with the club after Spink was sacked. He left Rovers in August 2003 to take up a role coaching the youth teams at Birmingham City, where Spink by now was goalkeeper coach.

== Illness and death ==
In May 2008, it was revealed he was suffering from bone cancer. He died on 2 February 2009 at the Good Hope Hospital in Sutton Coldfield.

Birch, who was 46 when he died, was married and had a daughter named Olivia who was born on 18 October 1997. His older brother Alan was also a professional footballer.

== Honours ==
- FA Youth Cup: 1980
- European Super Cup: 1982
