= 1982–83 Sheffield Wednesday F.C. season =

English football club season

During the 1982–83 season, the English football club Sheffield Wednesday F.C. was placed 6th in the Football League Second Division. The team reached the semifinal round of the FA Cup.

== Main events ==
- 30 September 1982: In the Second Division, surprise promotion contenders Grimsby Town head the race for a place in the First Division, joined by Wolverhampton Wanderers and Sheffield Wednesday in the top three.
- 31 October 1982: Sheffield Wednesday and Queens Park Rangers now head the Second Division promotion race, with Fulham joining them in the top three and their manager Malcolm Macdonald turning heads with his promising young side who are looking like serious contenders for a second successive promotion. Derby County (First Division champions as recently as 1975) are second from bottom.
- 30 November 1982: Queens Park Rangers, Fulham and Sheffield Wednesday head the Second Division promotion race.
- January 1983: Midfielder Pat Heard leaves Villa for Wednesday priced at £60,000.
- 18 January 1983: Wednesday have won just one of their last thirteen games undermining their promotion hopes.
- 31 January 1983: Wolverhampton Wanderers, Queens Park Rangers and Fulham continue to lead the way in the Second Division, with third placed Fulham now nine points ahead of their nearest challengers Sheffield Wednesday.
- 12 March 1983: Arsenal, Brighton & Hove Albion and Manchester United reach the FA Cup semi-finals after home wins in the sixth round. Burnley and Sheffield Wednesday draw 1-1 in an all-Second Division tie.
- 16 March 1983: Sheffield Wednesday thrash Burnley 5-0 to reach the FA Cup semi-finals for the first time since 1966.
- 16 April 1983 The Owls are defeated 2–1 by Brighton & Hove Albion in the FA Cup semi-final. Wednesday player Pat Heard, is forced to take a taxi to Highbury, London having been accidentally left behind by manager, Jack Charlton.
- 30 April 1983: Wolverhampton Wanderers need only one win from their final three games to be sure of promotion to the First Division alongside Queens Park Rangers. Fulham, meanwhile, have lapsed and are just one point ahead of Leicester City in the race for the final promotion place. Newcastle United and Sheffield Wednesday still have an outside chance of going up this season.

== Second Division final table ==
Pos	Team	Pld	W	D	L	GF	GA	GD	Pts
4	Fulham	42	20	9	13	64	47	+17	69
5	Newcastle United	42	18	13	11	75	53	+22	67
6	Sheffield Wednesday	42	16	15	11	60	47	+13	63
7	Oldham Athletic	42	14	19	9	64	47	+17	61
8	Leeds United	42	13	21	8	51	46	+5	60

Rules for classification: 1) Points; 2) Goal difference; 3) Goals scored
