= Paul Emson =

English footballer

Personal information
- Full name: Paul David Emson
- Date of birth: 22 October 1958
- Place of birth: Grimsby, often mistaken for Lincoln, England
- Height: 5 ft 10 in (1.78 m)
- Position: Left winger

Senior career*
Years	Team	Apps	(Gls)
–	Brigg Town		
1978–1983	Derby County	127	(13)
1983–1986	Grimsby Town	97	(15)
1986–1988	Wrexham	49	(5)
1988–1991	Darlington	48	(5)
1991	Kettering Town	15	(2)
1991	Gateshead	4	(1)
- * Club domestic league appearances and goals

Paul David Emson (born 22 October 1958) is an English former footballer who scored 38 goals from 321 appearances in the Football League playing on the left wing for Derby County, Grimsby Town, Wrexham and Darlington. He began his football career in the Grimsby & District League before moving into senior non-league football with Brigg Town, and later played in the Conference for Kettering Town and Gateshead.

== Honours ==
Darlington

- Football League Fourth Division: 1990–91
