= Goodison =

Goodison is a metronymic surname, from the old English personal name Godgifu (God's gift), later simply "Goody". The name also has Scottish origins and was recorded in 16th‑century Edinburgh, Scotland, as Gudsoun/Gudesoun or Gudson. Goodisson is a similar surname. Notable holders of this surname include:

- Sir Alan Goodison (1926–2006), British diplomat, succeeded Leonard Figg
- Benjamin Goodison (c.1700–1767), cabinetmaker to George II of Great Britain
- Ian Goodison (born 1972), Jamaican professional footballer
- John R. Goodison (1866–1926), Newfoundland merchant and political figure
- John Goodison (musician) (1943–1995), English rock musician and producer
- Lara Goodison (born 1989/90), English actress
- Lorna Goodison (born 1947), Jamaican poet, essayist and memoirist
- Lucy Goodison (born 1945), English archaeologist
- Sir Nicholas Goodison (1934–2021), British businessman
- Paul Goodison (born 1977), English Olympic sailor
- Wayne Goodison (born 1964), English professional footballer
- William Goodison (surgeon) (1785–1836), Irish-born British army surgeon
- William Goodison (politician) (1876–1928), Canadian businessman and member of Parliament

Goodisson

- Dick Goodisson (c. 1750–1817), English jockey
- Lillie Goodisson (c. 1860–1947), Australian feminist
- Tom Goodisson (1782–1840), English jockey, son of Dick Goodissson

== See also ==
- Goodison Park, football stadium (home to Everton F.C.) in Liverpool, England, named for the adjacent Goodison Road, itself named for George Goodison, civil engineer
- Goodison, Michigan, locality named for William Goodison, miller
