= Serhiy Zhuravlyov =

Soviet footballer (1959–2025)

Personal information
- Full name: Serhiy Mykolayovych Zhuravlyov
- Date of birth: 24 April 1959
- Place of birth: Brianka, Ukrainian SSR, USSR
- Date of death: March 2025 (aged 65)
- Height: 1.82 m (6 ft 0 in)
- Position: Defender

Senior career*
Years	Team	Apps	(Gls)
1977–1978	Zorya Luhansk	12	(0)
1979–1984	Dynamo Kyiv	127	(2)
1985	Shakhtar Donetsk	12	(0)
1986	Metalist Kharkiv	4	(0)
1986	Nistru Chişinău	20	(1)
1987	Podillya Khmelnytskyi	5	(0)
1987	Zorya Luhansk	23	(1)
1988	Dnipro Cherkasy	15	(0)

International career
1979	Ukraine		
Medal record
Men's football
Representing Soviet Union
UEFA European Under-21 Championship
Winner	1980 Europe
- * Club domestic league appearances and goals

Serhiy Mykolayovych Zhuravlyov (Ukrainian: Сергій Миколайович Журавльов; Russian: Сергей Николаевич Журавлёв; 24 April 1959 – March 2025) was a Soviet professional football defender who played for Dynamo Kyiv in the Soviet Top League. In 1979, he played couple of games for Ukraine at the Spartakiad of the Peoples of the USSR. On 4 March 2025, it was announced that Zhuravlyov had died at the age of 65.

== Honours ==
Dynamo Kyiv

- Soviet Top League: 1980, 1981; runner-up 1982; bronze 1979
- Soviet Cup: 1982
