= Lee Jenkins (footballer, born 1961) =

English footballer

Personal information
- Full name: Lee Robert Jenkins
- Date of birth: 17 March 1961 (age 65)
- Place of birth: West Bromwich, England
- Height: 5 ft 10 in (1.78 m)
- Position: Midfielder

Youth career
- Dunlop Terriers
- 1977–1979: Aston Villa

Senior career*
Years	Team	Apps	(Gls)
1979–1980	Aston Villa	3	(0)
1980–1981	Port Vale	1	(0)
1981–1985	RoPS	68	(3)
1985–1986	Birmingham City	1	(0)
1986	FinnPa	18	(1)
Total		91	(4)

International career
1978	England Youth	3	(0)
- * Club domestic league appearances and goals

Lee Robert Jenkins (born 17 March 1961) is an English former footballer who played in the Football League for Aston Villa, Port Vale and Birmingham City, and also played in Finland for RoPS and FinnPa.

== Career ==
Jenkins was born in West Bromwich, Staffordshire. He was capped three times by the England Youth team in 1978. A midfield player, he began his football career as an apprentice with Aston Villa in June 1977. The following year, he was part of the Villa side that reached the final of the FA Youth Cup. In January 1979, he signed his first full professional contract and was capped for England at youth level. Jenkins made three substitute appearances in the First Division before joining Port Vale in November 1980. His only appearance was on Boxing Day 1980 in a 1–0 home defeat by Lincoln City. Given a free transfer in April 1981, he moved to Finland where he played for Rovaniemi in the Mestaruussarja (top division). Jenkins returned to England, signing for Birmingham City in October 1985. He broke his ankle on his Birmingham debut, and the following April, with the club in financial difficulties, he was given a free transfer. He then returned to Finland where he played for FinnPa.

== Career statistics ==
Appearances and goals by club, season and competition
Club	Season	League			FA Cup		League Cup		Total	
Club	Season	Division	Apps	Goals	Apps	Goals	Apps	Goals	Apps	Goals
Aston Villa	1978–79	First Division	2	0	0	0	0	0	2	0
Aston Villa	1979–80	First Division	1	0	0	0	0	0	1	0
Aston Villa	Total		3	0	0	0	0	0	3	0
Port Vale	1980–81	Second Division	1	0	0	0	0	0	1	0
Birmingham City	1985–86	First Division	1	0	0	0	0	0	1	0
