= Teddy Maybank =

English footballer

Personal information
- Full name: Edward Glen Maybank
- Date of birth: 11 October 1956
- Place of birth: Lambeth
- Height: 5 ft 10 in (1.78 m)
- Position: Forward

Youth career
- 1972–1974: Chelsea

Senior career*
| Years | Team | Apps | (Gls) |
| 1974-1977 | Chelsea | 28 | (6) |
| 1976-1977 | → Fulham (loan) | | |
| 1977 | Fulham | 27 | (14) |
| 1977-1979 | Brighton & Hove Albion | 64 | (16) |
| 1979-1980 | Fulham | 19 | (3) |
| 1980-1981 | PSV Eindhoven | 6 | (1) |
| 1983-1984 | Whitehawk | 4 | (0) |
- * Club domestic league appearances and goals

Edward Glen "Teddy" Maybank (born 11 October 1956) is an English former professional footballer who played for Chelsea, Fulham and Brighton & Hove Albion in The Football League between 1974 and 1980 and subsequently for PSV Eindhoven in the Netherlands.

== Club career ==
=== Chelsea ===
Maybank made his first team debut aged 18 in a 2-0 defeat to Tottenham Hotspur in April 1975. He played in the remaining games of the season but could not prevent Chelsea being relegated to Division 2.

=== Fulham ===
After joining Fulham initially on loan in November 1976, Maybank signed permanently for the Cottagers for a fee of £65,000 in March 1977 only to join Alan Mullery's Brighton & Hove Albion six months later. Fulham used the fee to pay off the cost of building the Eric Miller (now the Riverside) Stand.

=== Brighton & Hove Albion ===
Maybank signed for a club record £237,000 and scored on his debut against Blackburn Rovers within six minutes, but ended the season needing a cartilage operation on his knee which was injured in a game against Leyton Orient just before Christmas. Despite been given a tough time by fans at the Goldstone Ground, Maybank netted a hat trick against Cardiff City on Boxing Day 1978 and played at Newcastle United in the side that won promotion to the top division for the first time in Albion's history. Maybank scored Albion's first ever goals in the top flight, at Villa Park in a 2-1 midweek defeat in the second game of the season and then at Maine Road against Manchester City.

=== Fuham ===
After a further falling out with Brighton manager Alan Mullery, Maybank re-signed at Craven Cottage for £150,000 in December 1979.

=== PSV Eindhoven ===
After Fulham were relegated to Division 3 the end of the 79-80 season, Maybank was signed by Dutch side PSV Eindhoven for a fee of £230,000, making his debut in a Joan Gamper Trophy match at the Nou Camp against Barcelona. He also played in the UEFA Cup against Wolves. Maybank retired soon after at the age of 24, unable to shake off his long standing knee injury.

== Later career ==
Maybank signed for Sussex County League side Whitehawk in December 1983 and made a small number of appearances alongside his former Brighton & Hove Albion teammate Gary Williams.

== Personal life ==
Maybank attended Christchurch Primary School and Stockwell Manor Secondary with ex-Chelsea and Fulham midfielder Ray Lewington, playing in the same Kingston League and South London Boys teams, before both becoming apprentices together at Stamford Bridge.

Maybank has appeared on TV shows Blind Date and The Weakest Link.
