= Willie Young (footballer, born 1956) =

Scottish footballer

William John Young (born 24 February 1956) was a Scottish professional footballer who played as a winger in the Football League for Aston Villa and Torquay United. He was educated at St Mirin's Academy, Paisley.

== Career ==
Young joined Aston Villa in July 1978 as a 22-year-old from Scottish junior side Arthurlie. His signing set the junior football record at the time with his debut coming when he started on 14 October against Manchester United. After three games in that first season, Young did not appear again in the Villa league side, and in October 1981 moved to Torquay United for a fee of £10,000. He played 38 times in the league for Torquay before leaving professional football due to injury.
