= Harry Kartz =

British businessman

- Photograph of Harry Kartz, circa 1940s

Chairman of Aston Villa F.C.
- In office 1978–1980
- Preceded by: Sir William Dugdale, Bt
- Succeeded by: Ron Bendall

Personal details
- Born: John Harry Kartz; 26 October 1913 Hockley, Birmingham, United Kingdom
- Died: 12 March 2016 (aged 102) Solihull, United Kingdom
- Spouse: Dorothy Cruse (m. 1940; d. 2012)
- Children: 2

Military service
- Allegiance: United Kingdom
- Branch/service: Royal Air Force
- Years of service: 1942–1945
- Rank: Flying officer
- Unit: No. IX Squadron
- Battles/wars: World War II

John Harry Kartz (23 October 1913 – 12 March 2016) was a British businessman best known for his longtime association with Aston Villa, having held various roles at the club, including as chairman from 1978 to 1980. Kartz also fought in the Second World War, as a front gunner in No. IX Squadron.

== Biography ==
In 1940, Kartz married Dorothy Cruse (1914–2012), and they were together for the next seventy-two years, until her death in 2012. The couple had two sons: John (born 1945) and Graham (born 1948).

Kartz fought in the Second World War as part of the newly formed No. IX Squadron. In an interview with the Birmingham Mail, he said of his time with the RAF Bomber Command: "I feel very lucky to have had the life I had. Seventy years ago I was flying Wellington Bombers over Germany for the RAF during World War II and I got away with that, so I feel very lucky.” He also recalled of a near-miss with a Junkers Ju 88, after his pilot took a charge of direction: "We asked Flying Control for permission to land and they said 'OK, do you want the flarepath on?' 'Oh, yes please.' So they said 'Well, fire your colours of the day, and we'll put on'. He did that, and when he fired his colours of the day, a Junkers 88 was sat at the back of us! Fortunately, they switched off the flarepath and the Junkers took off and dropped a fire behind us. Fortunately, we had taken off..." Post-war, Kartz became a self made businessman, operating his own engineering companies.

In 1919, Kartz attended his first Aston Villa match, and a lifelong love of the club was born. In the 1950s, he struck up a friendship with Doug Ellis. In 1968, Ellis appointed him as deputy chairman on the new Villa board, when the club was taken over by Pat Matthews. Prior to his involvement with the Villa board, he was a part of the Villa Shareholders Association. In 1978, when Ellis had a boardroom feud with Ron Bendall, Kartz sided with the latter, and Ellis was ousted. Afterwards, Bendall persuaded him to become chairman of the club. Kartz would go on to have a good working relationship with manager Ron Saunders, until a transfer dispute over Mick Ferguson and Peter Withe meant that he would resign as chairman, arguing that harmony between chairman and manager was vital. He was replaced by Bendall, and became vice-chairman for the next two seasons, in which Villa won the First Division title and the European Cup. He left the board in 1983. His legacy at Villa is supported by the youth scouting network set up with Tommy Docherty, that brought Brian Little and Gordon Cowans to the club, and helping the club purchase Bodymoor Heath, which still remains their training base.

Kartz also had a great love of horse racing, entering horses in the Derby and Arc de Triomphe; it was a "big win" in 1950 that was the catalyst for founded his engineering business.

In later life, Kartz twice appeared on ITV's 100 Year Old Drivers, firstly in August 2014, and then posthumously in September 2016. On 12 March 2016, Kartz died at the age of 102. He is survived by his sons, grandchildren and great-grandchildren.
