= David Geddis =

English footballer

Personal information
- Date of birth: 12 May 1958 (age 68)
- Place of birth: Carlisle, England
- Height: 5 ft 10 1/2 in (1.79 m)
- Position: Striker

Senior career*
Years	Team	Apps	(Gls)
1976–1979	Ipswich Town	43	(5)
1976–1977	→ Luton Town (loan)	13	(4)
1979–1983	Aston Villa	47	(12)
1982–1983	→ Luton Town (loan)	4	(0)
1983–1985	Barnsley	45	(24)
1985–1987	Birmingham City	46	(18)
1986–1987	→ Brentford (loan)	4	(0)
1986–1988	Shrewsbury Town	39	(11)
1988–1989	Swindon Town	10	(3)
1990–1991	Darlington	13	(0)
Total		264	(77)

International career
1976	England Youth	1	(0)
1978	England B	1	(0)

Managerial career
- 2006: Leeds United (caretaker)
- * Club domestic league appearances and goals

David Geddis (born 12 March 1958) is an English former professional footballer. He scored 77 goals from 264 appearances in the Football League and was an England Youth and B international. He was Aston Villa's record signing.

== Biography ==
=== Playing career ===
When Ipswich Town's leading goal scorer, Trevor Whymark, was injured against Norwich City on Boxing Day 1977, Geddis replaced him in the line-up and remained in the side. This enabled Geddis to become one of the youngest players ever to make an appearance in the FA Cup final, as Ipswich progressed through the competition to Wembley, where they beat Arsenal. Geddis delivered the cross which led to Roger Osborne's winning goal. Margaret Thatcher, who was elected Prime Minister the following year, when interviewed at the end of the match, mistakenly identified Trevor Whymark as the star player, not realising that although his name was in the programme as the Ipswich number 10, it was in fact Geddis who had caught her eye.

He was transferred to Aston Villa in 1979 for £300,000 and the following season won a league championship medal by being one of the 14 players Villa used that season. He filled in whenever Gary Shaw or Peter Withe were injured or suspended and is best remembered for scoring two goals in the 3–0 win over rivals Birmingham City. Geddis was an unused substitute during Aston Villa's victory in the 1982 European Cup Final.

He was a popular figure at Villa Park, but limited first team opportunities saw him move to then Second Division club Barnsley in September 1983, where he scored 24 goals in 45 starts before attracting the interest of his former Villa boss Ron Saunders at promotion-chasing Birmingham City just before Christmas 1984. He joined for a fee of £80,000 and quickly became a fans' favourite, largely due to his contribution to the promotion-winning campaign of the 1984–85 season.

He went on to play for Brentford, Shrewsbury Town, Swindon Town and Darlington.

=== Coaching career ===
In January 2002 Geddis was brought in by Sir Bobby Robson to work as coach alongside John Carver at Newcastle United. He was released from the position in September 2004 when Graeme Souness took over as manager and brought his own backroom staff with him from Blackburn Rovers.

Most recently, Geddis was reserve team coach at Leeds United, a job he took up after scouting for England manager Sven-Göran Eriksson and the Football Association at the 2006 World Cup in Germany. He also coached an English celebrity team, alongside former manager Terry Venables, for the Soccer Aid charity football match.

On 23 October 2006, Geddis replaced Carver as Leeds' caretaker manager. His only match in charge of the first team was the 3–1 League Cup defeat to Southend United, yet he was still not in complete control as Dennis Wise had input on team selection, having agreed terms with Leeds earlier in the day. On 25 October, Wise and his assistant Gustavo Poyet officially joined the club as the new management team. Geddis parted company with United on 19 December 2006.

== Honours ==
=== As a player ===
Ipswich Town

- FA Cup: 1977–78

Aston Villa

- Football League First Division: 1980–81
- FA Charity Shield: 1981 (shared)
- European Cup: 1981–82

Darlington

- Football League Fourth Division: 1990–91
