= Mark Jones (footballer, born October 1961) =

English footballer

Personal information
- Full name: Mark Anthony Waldron Jones
- Date of birth: 22 October 1961 (age 65)
- Place of birth: Warley, England
- Height: 5 ft 8 in (1.73 m)
- Position: Full back

Youth career
- 1977–1979: Aston Villa

Senior career*
Years	Team	Apps	(Gls)
1979–1984	Aston Villa	24	(0)
1984	Brighton & Hove Albion	9	(0)
1984–1987	Birmingham City	34	(0)
1987	Shrewsbury Town	0	(0)
1987–1991	Hereford United	157	(2)
1991–199?	Worcester City		
- * Club domestic league appearances and goals

Mark Anthony Waldron Jones (born 22 October 1961) is an English former footballer who played as a full back in the Football League for Aston Villa, Brighton & Hove Albion, Birmingham City, Shrewsbury Town and Hereford United during the 1980s.

He played in the 1982 European Super Cup in which Aston Villa defeated Barcelona 3–1 on aggregate.

== Honours ==
Aston Villa

- European Super Cup: 1982
- Intercontinental Cup runner-up: 1982
