= Ron Bendall =

British businessman (1909–1983)

Chairman of Aston Villa F.C.
- In office 1980–1982
- Preceded by: Harry Kartz
- Succeeded by: Doug Ellis

Personal details
- Born: Ronald Frederick Bendall; 18 November 1909 Balsall Heath, Birmingham, United Kingdom
- Died: 5 April 1983 (aged 74) Lezayre, Isle of Man, United Kingdom

Ronald Frederick Bendall (18 November 1909 – 5 April 1983) was a British businessman best known for his association with Aston Villa, being first a director from 1975 and then chairman from 1980 to 1982.

== Biography ==
Educated at Camp Hill Grammar School in Birmingham, Bendall made his fortune as a chartered accountant specialising in receiverships and liquidations.

His period as director of Aston Villa was fraught with problems and boardroom battles for power, most notably with Doug Ellis. Although there were major successes on the pitch under manager Ron Saunders during his tenure, in which the club won the First Division title in season 1980-81 and European Cup in season 1981-82, Bendall's regime was beset by controversy. He introduced his son, Donald to the board, and amid cries of nepotism Sir William Dugdale, Alan Smith and Harry Cressman resigned in protest. This was then followed by a power struggle with Doug Ellis and Eric Houghton. This boardroom struggle was eventually won by the Bendalls who bought out the Ellis shares in 1979 to give them a 42% holding in the club.

To the surprise of commentators and fans, Ron Saunders quit halfway through the 1981–82 season, with Villa in the quarter-final of the European Cup. Saunders had expressed his exasperation with the board at the lack of funds available to him to strengthen the team and fell out with the chairman Ron Bendall over the terms of his contract. Bendall cancelled the managers 'rollover' clause that would guarantee him a three-year pay-off in the event of his being sacked. Saunders was replaced by his softly-spoken assistant manager Tony Barton who guided the club to a 1–0 victory over Bayern Munich in the European Cup final in Rotterdam courtesy of a Peter Withe goal in the 67th minute, making Villa only the fourth English club to lift the European Cup.

Due to ill-health, Bendall sold his shares back to Doug Ellis in November 1982. The club was saddled with significant debts and questions had been raised by the police regarding fraudulent financial activity surrounding the building of the North Stand at Villa Park from 1980-82. The cost of the work was £1.3 million. An internal investigation found that £700,000 of the £1.3 million worth of bills were unaccounted for. A later report by accountants Deloitte found that there were "serious breaches of recommended codes of practice and poor site supervision."

Bendall died at Lezayre in the Isle of Man, where he was living as a tax exile.
