= Terry Donovan (footballer) =

Footballer (born 1958)

Personal information
- Date of birth: 27 February 1958 (age 68)
- Place of birth: Liverpool, England
- Height: 5 ft 11 in (1.80 m)
- Position: Striker

Senior career*
Years	Team	Apps	(Gls)
1976–1979	Grimsby Town	75	(28)
1979–1982	Aston Villa	24	(11)
1982	→ Oxford United (loan)	3	(0)
1982	Portland Timbers	15	(1)
1982–1983	Burnley	18	(6)
1983–1985	Rotherham United	11	(0)
Total		146	(46)

International career
1979–1981	Republic of Ireland	2	(0)
- * Club domestic league appearances and goals

Terry Donovan (born 27 February 1958) is a former footballer who played as a striker. Born and raised, and spending his entire playing career (apart from 15 appearances for the Portland Timbers based in Oregon), in England, he made two appearances for the Republic of Ireland national team at international level, qualifying through his Irish-born father.

== Career ==
Donovan played for Grimsby Town, Aston Villa, Oxford United (loan), Portland Timbers, Burnley and Rotherham United during his club career, and also played for Ireland's national team on two occasions.

He established himself as a prolific scorer during three seasons with his hometown club Grimsby Town, helping them gain promotion from the Fourth Division.

He joined Villa for £72,000 in 1979. Donovan contributed two goals in Villa's 5 – 0 victory over Valur in the early stages of 1981–82 European Cup. Villa went on to win the tournament.

== Personal life ==
Donovan attended Clee Grammar School (it became Matthew Humberstone School in 1973).

His late Irish father, Don Donovan, also represented Everton, Grimsby Town and the Republic of Ireland internationally. He managed Boston United from 1965 to 1969. He is the father of broadcaster Keeley Donovan.

== See also ==
- List of Republic of Ireland international footballers born outside the Republic of Ireland
