= Eamonn Deacy =

Irish footballer

Personal information
- Full name: Eamonn Stephen Deacy
- Date of birth: 1 October 1958
- Place of birth: Galway, Ireland
- Date of death: 13 February 2012 (aged 53)
- Place of death: Galway, Ireland
- Height: 5 ft 8 1/2 in (1.74 m)
- Position: Left back

Youth career
- West United

Senior career*
Years	Team	Apps	(Gls)
1975–1976	Sligo Rovers	10	(0)
1976	Galway Rovers	0	(0)
1976–1977	Limerick	17	(0)
1977–1978	Galway Rovers	29	(1)
1978–1984	Aston Villa	33	(1)
1983–1984	→ Derby County (loan)	5	(0)
1984–1991	Galway United	100	(4)

International career
1982	Republic of Ireland	4	(0)
1984	League of Ireland XI	1	(0)
- * Club domestic league appearances and goals

Eamonn "Chick" Deacy (1 October 1958 – 13 February 2012) was a professional footballer from Galway, Ireland.

== Career ==
=== Sligo Rovers ===
After a trial at Clyde Deacy made an impressive League of Ireland debut for Sligo Rovers away to Shelbourne at Harold's Cross Stadium on 14 December 1975. His only win in Sligo's colours came at Glenmalure Park on 4 January 1976. The next month he faced Geoff Hurst at Turners Cross.

=== Galway Rovers F.C. ===
His debut game for his home town club, then Galway Rovers F.C., was in the FAI League Cup on 5 September 1976. Deacy made his debut for Limerick on 28 November 1976 at Flower Lodge. At the end of the season, he was on the losing side in the FAI Cup final. However, in his last game for the Shannonsiders he won the Munster Senior Cup. Returning to his home club, Deacy scored Galway Rovers first goal in the League of Ireland on 2 October 1977.

=== Aston Villa ===
The 21-year-old full back left Galway for Aston Villa in February 1979, after writing 12 letters to the club requesting a trial. He went on to have an unforgettable five years at the club, during which time they won the League Championship, European Cup and European Super Cup.

He was one of only 14 players used by Ron Saunders in the 1980–81 league-winning season, making enough appearances (11 in all, including six starts) to win a medal (he was Villa's number 12 on 19 occasions that season). He made one appearance for Villa in European competition when the defending European champions played against Juventus in the 1982–83 European Cup. He had a brief loan spell at Derby, where he played five games, before rejecting an offer of a new two-year deal from Villa to return home to Galway.

=== Return to Galway ===
Deacy's first game back in the Maroon was in a League of Ireland Cup tie against Finn Harps on 2 September 1984.

His last League of Ireland game was also in Harold's Cross on St Patrick's Day 1991 away to St Patrick's Athletic.

=== International career ===
He won 4 caps for the Republic of Ireland national football team. He also played for the Republic of Ireland national football team amateur team that qualified for the 1978 UEFA Amateur Cup.

== Death and legacy ==
He died following a heart attack on 13 February 2012. Terryland Park was renamed Eamonn Deacy Park in honour of Chick A testimonial was held on 18 August at Eamonn Deacy Park.

== Honours ==
Galway United

- FAI Cup (1): 1991
- FAI League Cup (1): 1985–86

Limerick

- Munster Senior Cup (1): 1977

Aston Villa

- Football League First Division (1): 1980–81
- FA Charity Shield (1): 1981 (shared)
- European Cup (1): 1982
- European Super Cup (1): 1982
