= Nigel Spink =

English footballer

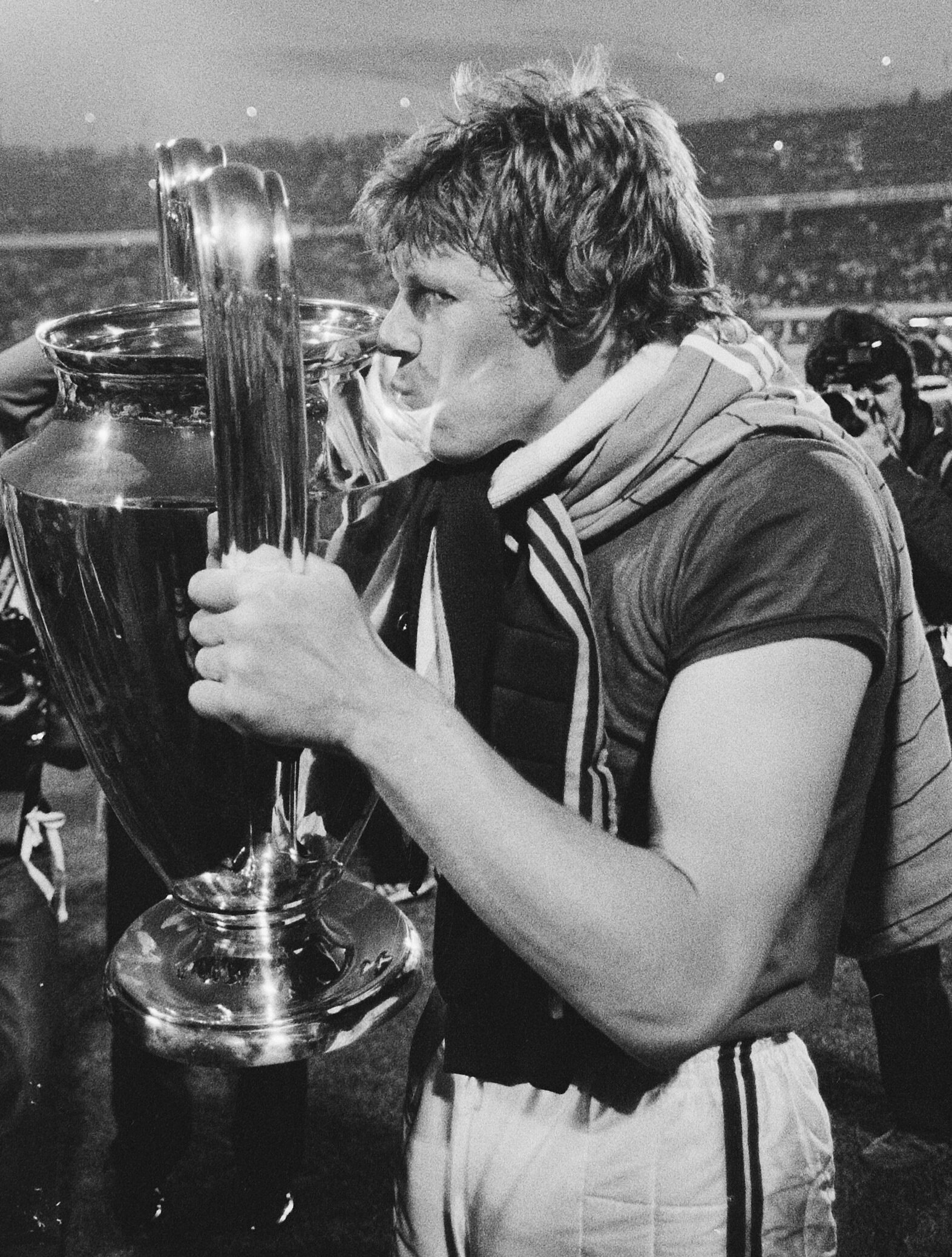
- Spink in 1982

Personal information
- Full name: Nigel Philip Spink
- Date of birth: 8 August 1958 (age 68)
- Place of birth: Chelmsford, England
- Height: 6 ft 4 in (1.93 m)
- Position: Goalkeeper

Youth career
- –1976: West Ham United

Senior career*
| Years | Team | Apps | (Gls) |
| 1976–1977 | Chelmsford City | 17 | (0) |
| 1977–1996 | Aston Villa | 361 | (0) |
| 1996–1997 | West Bromwich Albion | 19 | (0) |
| 1997–2000 | Millwall | 44 | (0) |
| 2000–2001 | Forest Green Rovers | 14 | (0) |
| Total | | 455 | (0) |

International career
| 1983 | England | 1 | (0) |
| 1991 | England B | 2 | (0) |

Managerial career
- 2000–2002: Forest Green Rovers
- * Club domestic league appearances and goals

Nigel Philip Spink (born 8 August 1958) is an English football coach and former professional footballer.

He played as a goalkeeper from 1976 until 2001. He made his name at Aston Villa and also made one appearance for England at international level on the tour of Australia in 1983. He played in the Aston Villa team that beat Barcelona 3–0 at Villa Park to win the 1982 European Super Cup.

He also played in the Football League for West Bromwich Albion and Millwall, and at non-league level for Chelmsford City and Forest Green Rovers, the latter he would go on to manage between 2000 and 2002. Spink later worked as a goalkeeping coach for Birmingham City, Wigan Athletic, Sunderland and Bristol City.

== Club career ==
Spink began his career with Writtle Minors F.C. at junior level before going as a school boy to West Ham United, but soon moved to Chelmsford City and then, at the age of 18, to Aston Villa. He made his debut on 26 December 1979 in a 2-1 loss away to Nottingham Forest.

At Villa it was almost five years before his big break in the first team came along, and it came on the biggest stage of all – the European Cup Final. Ten minutes into the 1982 final against Bayern Munich, Villa's first choice goalkeeper, Jimmy Rimmer, was injured and substitute keeper, 23-year-old Spink, was called into action, having only made one previous appearance in the first team. Spink performed superbly, keeping a clean sheet, and Villa won the game 1–0. By coincidence, Spink and Rimmer are two of the four England goalkeepers with the shortest international career (45 minutes).

He went on to make 460 appearances for Villa, making his last appearance as an outfielder against QPR in December 1995, having replaced the injured Ian Taylor in the final minute. He then moved to neighbouring club West Bromwich Albion in 1996, almost two decades after first joining Villa. Spink made 24 appearances in all for Albion, and became the oldest goalkeeper to appear for the club when, at the age of 39 years and 19 days, he kept goal in a League Cup tie against Cambridge United on 27 August 1997, a record since broken by Dean Kiely at 39 years, 189 days.

A £50,000 move in September 1997 took him down a division to Millwall in Division Two, and he continued playing at The Den for another three seasons until he finally retired in June 2000, just before his 42nd birthday.

== International career ==
Spink played for England B in 1991 and he made his only England appearance as a substitute on 19 June 1983 during the 1–1 draw against Australia.

== Coaching career ==
After retiring as a player, Spink had a two-year spell as manager of Forest Green Rovers in the Conference National. He led Forest Green to the 2001 FA Trophy final but they lost 1–0 against Canvey Island at Villa Park. He was eventually sacked in September 2002.

He then worked under Steve Bruce at Birmingham City, Wigan Athletic and Sunderland as a goalkeeping coach. He left Sunderland on 6 December 2011, following Bruce's dismissal a few days earlier. Spink was goalkeeping coach at Bristol City from February 2012

== Personal life ==
After the end of the 2012–13 season, Spink left the game and started his own courier business.

== Honours ==
Aston Villa

- Football League Cup: 1993–94
- European Cup: 1981–82
- European Super Cup: 1982

Individual

- PFA Team of the Year: 1987–88 Second Division
