= Kenny Swain =

English football player and manager (born 1952)

Personal information
- Full name: Kenneth Swain
- Date of birth: 28 January 1952 (age 74)
- Place of birth: Birkenhead, England
- Height: 5 ft 11 in (1.80 m)
- Positions: Full back; midfielder; striker

Senior career*
Years	Team	Apps	(Gls)
1973	Wycombe Wanderers	6	(1)
1973–1978	Chelsea	119	(26)
1978–1982	Aston Villa	148	(2)
1982–1985	Nottingham Forest	112	(2)
1985–1988	Portsmouth	113	(0)
1987–1988	→ West Bromwich Albion (loan)	7	(1)
1988–1992	Crewe Alexandra	126	(1)
Total		631	(33)

Managerial career
- 1993–1994: Wigan Athletic
- 1996–1997: Grimsby Town (caretaker)
- 2004–2014: England U16
- 2012–2013: England U17
- * Club domestic league appearances and goals

Kenneth Swain (born 28 January 1952) is an English former footballer who played in numerous positions, including striker, midfielder and full back.

== Playing career ==
Swain began his professional career with Londoners Chelsea, signing from Wycombe Wanderers in the summer of 1973. As he had been a non-contract player with Wycombe, having joined them from college football, his signing-on fee was just £500. He made his League debut for Chelsea in 1974. His most successful season with the club came in 1976–77, when his strike partnership with Steve Finnieston helped Eddie McCreadie's young side win promotion back to the First Division. He remained with Chelsea until 1979, when they were relegated, and then signed for Aston Villa for £100,000.

With Villa, Swain was switched to full-back and was a part of the team which won the league championship and European Cup in consecutive seasons. He left Villa in 1982 and had spells with Nottingham Forest, Portsmouth and finally Crewe Alexandra. He achieved success later in his career, adding to the league title and European Cup winner's medals at Aston Villa with a Second Division runners-up medal at Portsmouth in 1987, and achieving promotion in third place with Crewe from the Fourth Division in 1989.

== Managerial career ==
Following his retirement, he moved into management, with stints at Grimsby Town and Wigan Athletic. He also managed the England under-16s for a decade between 2004–2014 and was as an assistant coach for the England national under-17 football team between 2012 and 2013.

== Personal life ==
By 1974 he had qualified as a teacher specialising in Handicraft and Physical Education. Between 2002 and 2004, Swain was Director of Football at Thomas Telford School.He is married and had 2 stepsons, 1 son and two nieces. All hold professional jobs in the Legal and PR industries.

== Managerial statistics ==
As of 21 April 2014

Team	From	To	Record				
Team	From	To	G	W	D	L	Win %
Wigan Athletic	28 May 1993	2 September 1994	53	14	12	27	26.42
Grimsby Town(caretaker)	15 November 1996	21 May 1997	30	8	9	13	26.67
England U16	7 April 2004	21 April 2014	94	58	21	15	61.70
England U17	2 February 2012	10 August 2013	11	6	4	1	54.55
Total			188	86	46	56	45.74

== Honours ==
Aston Villa

- Football League First Division: 1980–81
- FA Charity Shield: 1981 (shared)
- European Cup: 1981–82

Individual

- PFA Team of the Year: 1980–81 First Division, 1981–82 First Division
