= Ivor Linton =

English footballer (born 1959)

Personal information
- Full name: Ivor Linton
- Date of birth: 20 November 1959 (age 66)
- Place of birth: West Bromwich, England
- Height: 5 ft 10 in (1.78 m)
- Position: Midfielder

Youth career
- 1976–1977: Aston Villa

Senior career*
| Years | Team | Apps | (Gls) |
| 1977–1982 | Aston Villa | 27 | (0) |
| 1982–1983 | Peterborough United | 27 | (3) |
| 1983–1984 | Birmingham City | 4 | (0) |
| 1984 | Bilston Town | | |
| 1984 | LappBK | 20 | (4) |
| 1985–1987 | Kaskö IK | | |
| 1988–1999 | IF Kraft Narpes | 243 | (41) |
- * Club domestic league appearances and goals

Ivor Linton (born 20 November 1959) is an English former professional footballer who played in the Football League for Aston Villa, Peterborough United and Birmingham City. He played as a midfielder.

== Career ==
Linton was born in West Bromwich, Staffordshire (now in the West Midlands). He joined Aston Villa as an apprentice in May 1976, and turned professional in September 1977. He made his debut in the First Division on 16 May 1977, as a 17-year-old apprentice, as a substitute in a home game against Stoke City which Villa won 1–0. In six years with the club he played regularly for the reserve team, and made 17 starts and 13 substitute appearances in all competitions for the first team, one of which was in the first leg of the 1982 European Cup second round match against Dynamo Berlin, when he conceded a penalty with his first touch.

In the 1982 close season he joined Peterborough United of the Fourth Division on a free transfer. Released by the club after 27 league games, he returned to the First Division by way of a trial with Birmingham City, during which he played four league games and became the first black player to appear for both major Birmingham-based clubs. After a spell in non-League football with Bilston Town, Linton moved to Finland where he played for Kaskö IK and then for many years for Kraft Närpes.

He finally retired from the game at the age of 39 and returned home to West Bromwich where he worked as an electrician, and appeared for the Villa Old Boys team.
