= Jimmy Rimmer =

English footballer (1948–2026)

- Rimmer playing for Arsenal, c. 1974–77

Personal information
- Full name: John James Rimmer
- Date of birth: 10 February 1948
- Place of birth: Southport, Lancashire, England
- Date of death: 14 August 2026 (aged 78)
- Height: 5 ft 11 in (1.80 m)
- Position: Goalkeeper

Youth career
- 1963–1965: Manchester United

Senior career*
Years	Team	Apps	(Gls)
1965–1974	Manchester United	34	(0)
1973	→ Swansea City (loan)	17	(0)
1974–1977	Arsenal	124	(0)
1977–1983	Aston Villa	229	(0)
1983–1986	Swansea City	66	(0)
1986	Ħamrun Spartans	0	(0)
1986	Luton Town	0	(0)
Total		470	(0)

International career
1976	England	1	(0)

Managerial career
- 1995–1996: Swansea City (caretaker)
- 1996: Swansea City (caretaker)
- * Club domestic league appearances and goals

John James Rimmer (10 February 1948 – 14 August 2026) was an English footballer who played as a goalkeeper in the Football League for Manchester United, Swansea City, Arsenal and Aston Villa.

Rimmer, who won two European Cup winners medals, has been described by the Birmingham Mail as "perhaps the greatest goalkeeper in Aston Villa's history".

== Club career ==
Rimmer joined Manchester United as a schoolboy in 1963, turning professional two years later. He spent eleven years at Old Trafford, chiefly as Alex Stepney's understudy, including being on the bench in the 1968 European Cup final. Rimmer only played 46 times for United and in October 1973, he was loaned to Swansea City. Arsenal signed him from United in February 1974, as a long-term replacement for Bob Wilson.

He made only one appearance in 1973–74, keeping a clean sheet on his debut against Liverpool. After Wilson's retirement at the end of that season, Rimmer became Arsenal's No. 1 for the next three seasons, and was a near ever-present for the Gunners, winning Arsenal's Player of The Year award in 1975.

A year after Tottenham Hotspur manager Terry Neill took over at Arsenal, he signed Pat Jennings from his old club and Rimmer was sold to Aston Villa, having played 146 games for Arsenal.

At Villa, Rimmer was No. 1 for the next six seasons, winning a First Division winners' medal in 1981. The following year Villa reached the European Cup final, but Rimmer was injured after only nine minutes and had to be replaced by Nigel Spink. Villa beat Bayern Munich 1–0, meaning Rimmer became the second player, after Saul Malatrasi, to win a European Cup winners' medal at two clubs.

Rimmer left Villa in 1983 to rejoin Swansea City.

== International career ==
During his time at Arsenal, Rimmer also won his only England cap, against Italy in a friendly. Rimmer let two goals in and was substituted at half-time; England went on to recover and win 3–2.

== Managerial and coaching career ==
After retiring from playing, Rimmer became Swansea's goalkeeping coach. During the 1995–96 season, he had two spells as caretaker manager. He succeeded fellow caretaker manager Bobby Smith, and had another spell in charge following the resignation of Kevin Cullis, before being replaced by Jan Mølby. He then spent several years in China as goalkeeping coach for their national team and Dalian Shide.

== Personal life and death ==
Rimmer was born in Southport, Lancashire.

After coaching in Canada, Rimmer retired from football and went on to live in Gorseinon, Swansea.

Rimmer died on 14 August 2026, at the age of 78.

== Honours ==
Manchester United

- European Cup: 1967–68

Aston Villa

- Football League First Division: 1980–81
- FA Charity Shield: 1981
- European Cup: 1981–82
- European Super Cup: 1982

Individual

- Arsenal Player of the Season: 1974−75
