= Brendon Ormsby =

English footballer (born 1960)

Personal information
- Full name: Brendon Thomas Christopher Ormsby
- Date of birth: 1 October 1960 (age 66)
- Place of birth: Birmingham, England
- Height: 5 ft 10 1/2 in (1.79 m)
- Position: Centre back

Youth career
- 1976–1978: Aston Villa

Senior career*
Years	Team	Apps	(Gls)
1978–1986	Aston Villa	117	(4)
1986–1990	Leeds United	57	(7)
1990	→Shrewsbury Town (loan)	1	(0)
1990–1992	Doncaster Rovers	78	(7)
1992–1993	Scarborough	16	(1)
1993–1994	Waterford United	23	(2)
1994–1995	Wigan Athletic	2	(0)
- Garforth Town

International career
1976	England Schoolboys	8	(0)
1978–1979	England Youth	12	(0)

Managerial career
- 1993–1994: Waterford United
- 2011–2012: Pontefract Collieries
- * Club domestic league appearances and goals

Brendon Thomas Christopher Ormsby (born 1 October 1960, Birmingham) is an English former professional footballer who played as a centre back for Aston Villa, Leeds United, Shrewsbury, Doncaster, Waterford United, Scarborough and Wigan. Ormsby was a product of the Aston Villa Academy and spent most of his professional career at the club.

The 16-year-old Ormsby joined Villa in 1976 as a YTS apprentice.

Ormsby led Leeds to the FA Cup semi-final and Division Two play-offs in 1986–87. He worked as a postman in Leeds Moortown after retiring from football.

During his later years he has worked as a coach at Senior and Junior levels, including a spell working with Lawnswood Lasers JFC.

Ormsby is also the honorary president of the Scarborough Branch of the Leeds United Member's Club. He attends the club's annual 'On The Road' evening and his role has led to a beer being named after him. Ormsby's Bitter is brewed by the Wold Top brewery and can be sampled at the Spa Complex on the town's sea front. Between 2000 and 2012, he worked for the Press Association, providing live by the second actions from Leeds United, Bradford City and Manchester City as part of the Football Live Project, these details were used to supply all major sports media outlets, including BBC & Sky Sports Vidiprinter.

Ormsby served as First Team Manager at Pontefract Collieries between 2012 and 2014, finishing fifth in each season.

== Honours ==
Individual

- PFA Team of the Year: 1990–91 Fourth Division
