= Gary Shaw (footballer, born 1961) =

English footballer (1961–2024)

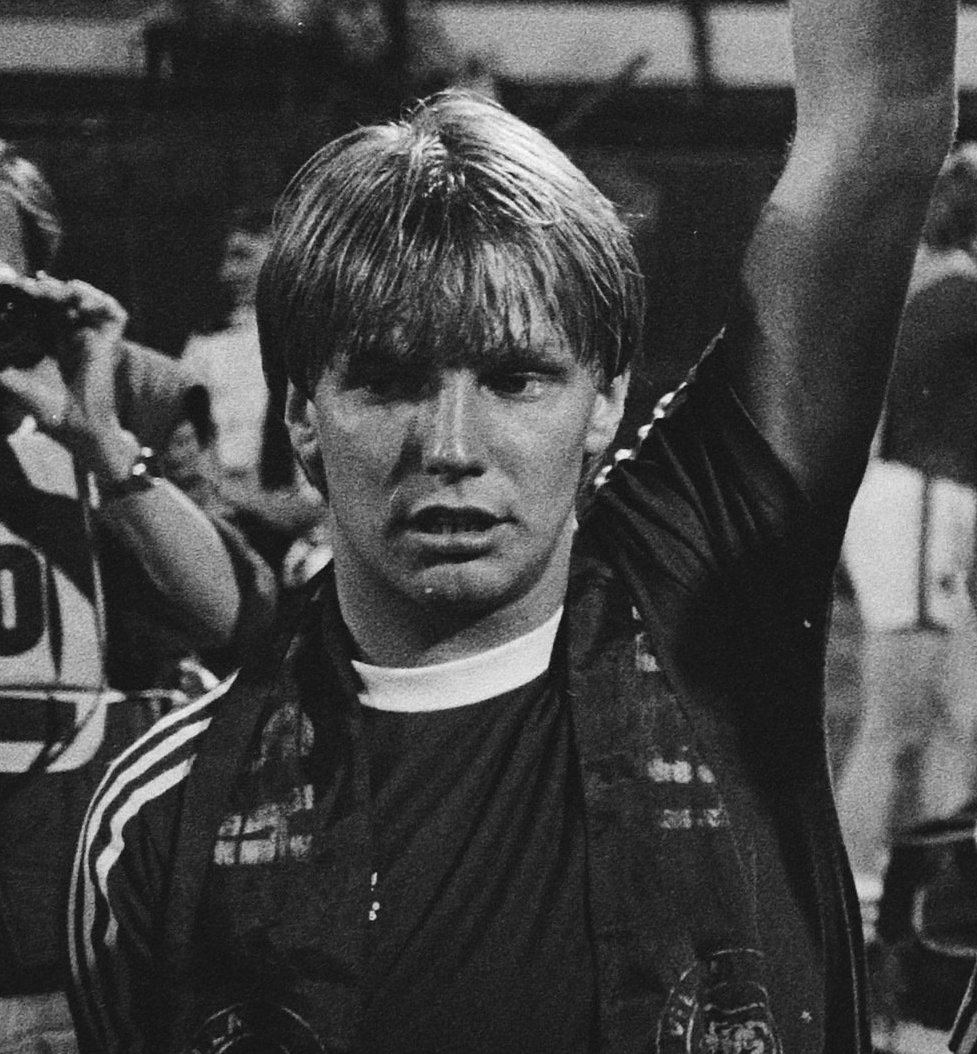
- Shaw in 1982

Personal information
- Full name: Gary Robert Shaw
- Date of birth: 21 January 1961
- Place of birth: Birmingham, England
- Date of death: 16 September 2024 (aged 63)
- Place of death: Birmingham, England
- Height: 5 ft 10 in (1.78 m)
- Position: Striker

Youth career
- 1977–1978: Aston Villa

Senior career*
Years	Team	Apps	(Gls)
1978–1988	Aston Villa	165	(59)
1987	→ Blackpool (loan)	9	(0)
1988	Kjøbenhavns Boldklub	15	(4)
1988–1990	SK Austria Klagenfurt	9	(7)
1990	Walsall	9	(3)
1990	Kilmarnock	2	(0)
1990–1991	Shrewsbury Town	22	(5)
1991–1992	Ernest Borel		
Total		231	(71)

International career
1978–1979	England Youth	9	(4)
1981–1982	England U21	7	(2)
- * Club domestic league appearances and goals

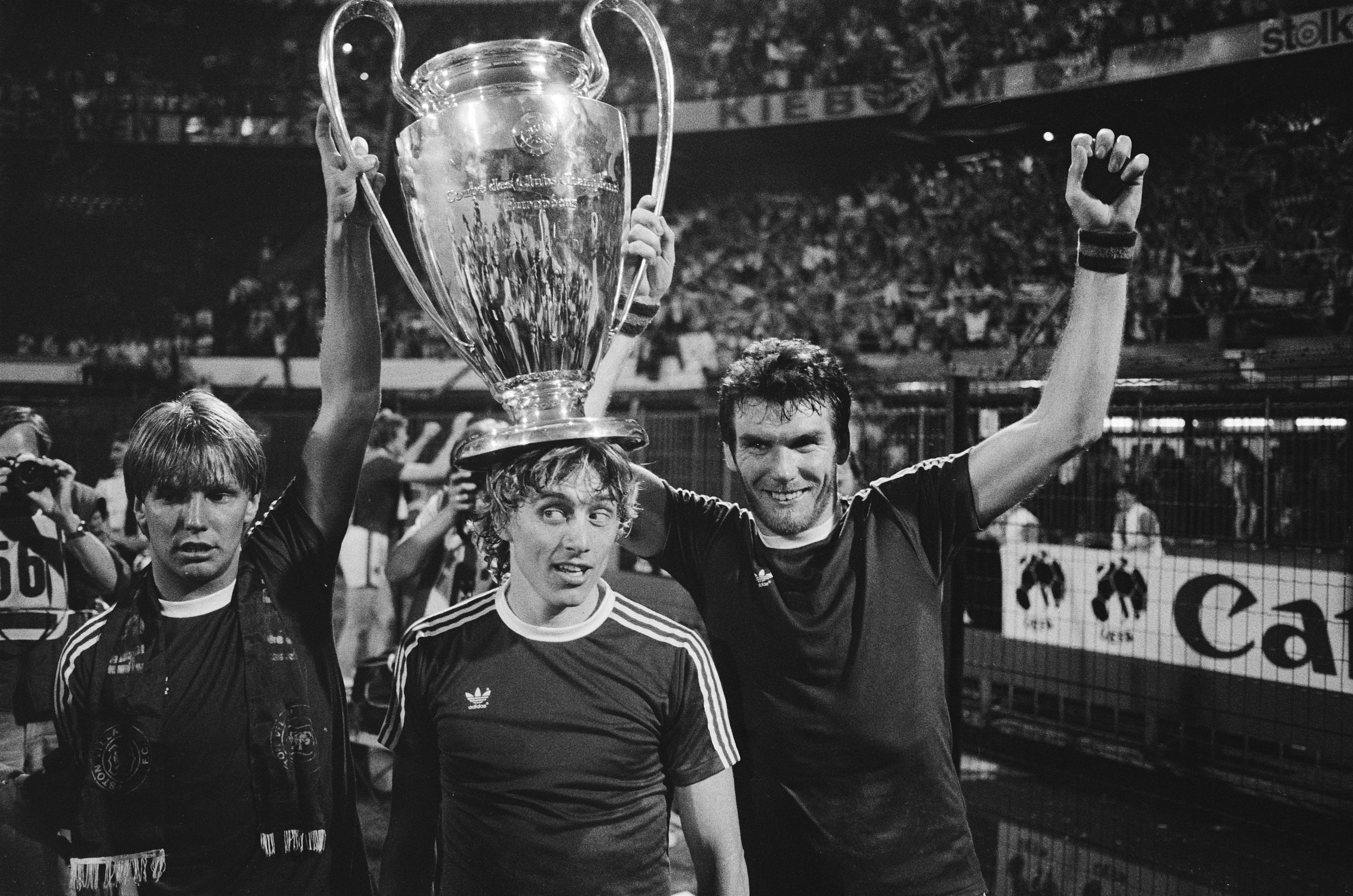
Gary Shaw (left) with Tony Morley and Peter Withe after winning the 1982 European Cup on 26 May

Gary Robert Shaw (21 January 1961 – 16 September 2024) was an English professional football striker who played for Aston Villa in the early 1980s.

== Club career ==
During the 1980s, Shaw's goals helped Aston Villa win the First Division championship in 1980–81 and the European Cup the following year – the only Birmingham-born player in the team. In 1981, he was voted PFA Young Player of the Year, and was awarded the Bravo Award the following year, as the best under-23 player in European competitions.

His promising Villa career was hindered after sustaining a knee injury in an away game at Nottingham Forest in September 1983. After a heavy tackle, he was helped to his feet by Ian Bowyer and, in Shaw's words, something in his knee 'clicked'. The rest of his career was plagued by frequent injuries. He continued to play for Villa until the conclusion of the 1987–88 season.

In July 1988 he made his debut for Copenhagen-based Kjøbenhavns Boldklub in Denmark, moving to Austria Klagenfurt in Austria in 1989. He finished his career with brief spells at Walsall, Kilmarnock, Shrewsbury Town and the Hong Kong-based Ernest Borel.

== International career ==
Shaw gained seven caps for the England under-21 team. Following a successful European Cup campaign with Aston Villa, he was also included in the 40-strong preliminary England squad for the 1982 FIFA World Cup finals; however, he was not picked in the final 22.

== Death ==
On 6 September 2024, Shaw suffered a head injury after a fall at his home in Birmingham and was admitted to hospital in a "serious condition". Following reports of his death on 15 September, Shaw's family released a statement that he was still in hospital, with his condition being described as "grave and serious". Shaw died the next day at the age of 63. Aston Villa released a statement on behalf of Shaw's family stating that he had died peacefully earlier that day, surrounded by his family.

On 17 September, the day following Shaw's death - Aston Villa played Young Boys in Bern, in their first game in the European Cup (now called the Champions League) since Shaw's playing days. The Swiss club displayed a tribute to Shaw before the game, with Aston Villa manager Unai Emery saying the subsequent win was in Shaw's honour.

On Aston Villa's first home game since Shaw's death, a Premier League game against Wolverhampton Wanderers, Villa Park displayed banners of Shaw. His former teammates were invited as guests of honour and a minute's applause was held before the game.

Shaw's funeral took place on 16 October 2024, crowds of supporters lined the route of a funeral procession starting at Villa Park and leading to a service at Sutton Coldfield Crematorium.

On 6 December 2024, the coroner returned a verdict of accidental death.

== Honours ==
Aston Villa

- First Division: 1980–81
- European Cup: 1981–82
- European Super Cup: 1982

Individual

- Bravo Award (Awarded to the Most Outstanding Young Footballer in Europe): 1982
- PFA Young Player of the Year: 1981
- PFA Team of the Year: 1980–81
