= History of Aston Villa F.C. (1961–present) =

History of an English football club

Chart showing the progress of Aston Villa F.C. through the English football league system from the inaugural season in 1888–89 to the present

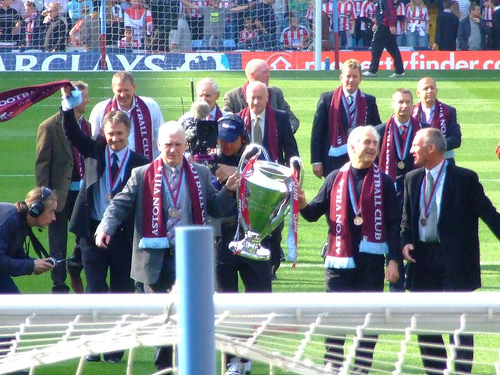
The 1982 European Cup winning squad at Villa Park during the 25 year anniversary celebrations

The history of Aston Villa Football Club from 1961 to the current season covers the fluctuating fortunes of the club during the 1960s and 1970s, the European Cup victory in 1982 and the present day Premier League club.

The late 1960s was a turbulent time for the club. The problems began when the club, under manager Dick Taylor, was relegated from the first tier of English football for the third time in 1967. Within two years, pressure from supporters led to the resignation of the board of directors. The club was then relegated to the Third Division. In the 1971–72 season, Aston Villa returned to the Second Division as champions with a record 70 points. In 1974 Ron Saunders was appointed manager, and by 1975 he led the club back into the First Division and into European competition. It continued to have much success under Saunders, winning the league in the 1980–81 season. Saunders' resignation halfway through the 1981–82 season came as a surprise, with the club in the quarter-final of the European Cup. He was replaced by his assistant manager Tony Barton who guided them to 1–0 victory over Bayern Munich in the European Cup final in Rotterdam. However, winning the cup marked a pinnacle, and the club fell steadily down the League standings over the next five years and was relegated in 1987. The club was promoted the following year, and achieved second place in the Football League in 1990 under manager Graham Taylor.

Villa was one of the founding members of the Premier League in 1992 and finished runners-up to Manchester United in the inaugural season. The 1990s was a decade of inconsistency; the club had three different managers, and league positions were unpredictable, despite winning two League Cups. They reached the FA Cup Final for the first time since 1957 in 2000, but lost 1–0 to Chelsea in the last game to be played at the old Wembley Stadium. Villa's league position continued to fluctuate under various managers and, in the summer of 2006, David O'Leary left under acrimonious circumstances. Martin O'Neill arrived to a rapturous reception from team supporters. After 23 years as chair and largest shareholder, owning approximately 38% of the club, Doug Ellis decided to sell his stake to Randy Lerner, the owner of the NFL franchise Cleveland Browns. The arrival of a new owner and manager marked the start of sweeping changes throughout the club, including a new crest, a new kit sponsor and new players in the summer of 2007.

2007–08 saw Villa qualify for the Intertoto Cup. In the 2008–09 season they reached the group stage of the UEFA Cup for the first time in seven years. The first major final of the Randy Lerner era was the 2010 Football League Cup Final; Villa lost 2–1 to Manchester United. Martin O’Neill resigned before the 2010–11 season and was replaced by Gérard Houllier. After suffering from health problems, he was replaced by the former Birmingham City manager Alex McLeish. His contract was terminated at the end of the 2011–12 season after the team narrowly avoided relegation. On 28 February 2012, the club announced a financial loss of £53.9 million. Paul Lambert replaced McLeish in July 2012. Lerner put the club up for sale on 12 May 2014, with an estimated value of £200 million. In the 2014–15 season Aston Villa scored just 12 goals in 25 league games, the lowest in Premier League history, and Lambert was sacked in February 2015. Tim Sherwood replaced him and saved Villa from relegation in the 2014–15 season taking them to the 2015 FA Cup Final. He was fired in October 2015 and replaced by Rémi Garde who left in March 2016 with the club rooted in the bottom of the table. They were relegated from the Premier League on 16 April. In June 2016, Chinese businessman Tony Xia bought the club for £76 million. Roberto Di Matteo was appointed manager and was replaced shortly by Steve Bruce. In the 2017–18 season Villa lost the 2018 EFL Championship play-off final at Wembley Stadium. In July 2018 Aston Villa were sold by Xia to Nassef Sawiris and Wes Edens. They sacked Bruce and appointed Dean Smith, who led the team back to the Premier League with victory in the 2019 EFL Championship play-off final.

== Instability ==
Winning the League Cup in 1961 was a pinnacle for the club. Although Villa finished seventh in 1961–62, the following season saw the beginning of a decline in form that would see them finish in 15th place in 1963 and fourth from the bottom in 1964. Manager Joe Mercer parted company with the club in July 1964 because of these results and his declining health. His replacement, Dick Taylor, managed to avoid relegation in the 1964–65 season as Villa finished 16th after a poor start to the season. The following year Villa finished 16th once again. Following a 4–2 final day defeat by Everton the club was relegated to the Second Division in the 1966–67 season. Dick Taylor was sacked, and Tommy Cummings was appointed in his place. The decline was not solely the responsibility of the manager; the club had an ageing five-man board "who had failed to adapt to the new football reality". The club had neither developed a scouting network nor an effective coaching structure. The board had also sold two of Villa's best players, Phil Woosnam and Tony Hateley. The fans' calls for the board to resign became more and more pronounced when Villa finished 16th in the Second Division in 1968.

Events on the pitch came to a head in November 1968. With Villa lying at the bottom of Division Two, the board sacked Cummings. On 21 November 1968 the problems in the boardroom were highlighted when board member George Robinson resigned. Following his resignation, the board issued a statement: "[The board] would make available, by their resignation, such seats as new financial arrangements might require". Aston Villa F.C. was up for sale. After much speculation London financier Pat Matthews bought control of the club. He brought in local travel agent Doug Ellis as chair of the new board that was convened on 16 December 1968. Two days later Tommy Docherty was appointed as manager.

== Rebuilding ==
Docherty rebuilt confidence in the team, and Villa went on to win five consecutive games and retained a place in the Second Division. In the short time that Docherty had been at the club, attendances rose significantly from a low of just over 12,000 against Charlton Athletic in December. In the summer of 1969 the first share issue since 1896 raised £200,000 for the club, £140,000 of which was spent on new players. In the following season, however, Villa took ten games to register a win. By Christmas 1969, they were at the bottom of the Second Division, and Docherty was sacked. His successor, Vic Crowe, was unable to prevent the team from being relegated to the third tier of English football for the first time in its history in the 1969–70 season. Despite finishing fourth in the Third Division in the 1970–71 season, Villa reached the League Cup final after beating Manchester United in the semi-final. They were defeated in the final by Tottenham Hotspur 2–0. The 1971–72 season saw the club return to the Second Division as champions with a then divisional record 70 points. They were invited to take part in the 1972 FA Charity Shield but lost 1–0 to Manchester City. In the autumn of 1972, there was a revolt in the boardroom, and four of the five directors voted to oust Doug Ellis from the board. Within 43 days though, Ellis was reinstated as chair after he had received the support of the largest shareholder Pat Matthews, and supporters at an extraordinary general meeting who voted to replace the existing directors. Their first season back in the Second Division in 1972–73 saw Villa narrowly miss out on a second successive promotion when they finished third. However, the following season Villa finished 14th and Ellis sacked Crowe, replacing him with Ron Saunders.

For the club's centenary season of 1974–75, Saunders brought in only two new players, Frank Carrodus and Leighton Phillips. At the end of his first season in charge, Villa were back in the First Division after finishing second, and won the 1975 League Cup final at Wembley Stadium. Villa beat Norwich City 1–0 with Ray Graydon scoring the winning goal. At the beginning of the 1975–76 season Doug Ellis resigned as chair but remained on the board. Ellis left the club in a good position on the field. They were in the First Division and the UEFA Cup for the first time due to the League Cup win of 1975. The club's first season of European football was short-lived as they were beaten 5–1 by Antwerp in the first round. In the following season, Villa finished fourth in the League and reached the quarter-finals of the FA Cup. In the 1976–77 season, two years after their last League Cup win, they beat Everton 3–2 in the 1977 Final after a second replay.

== League and European victories ==
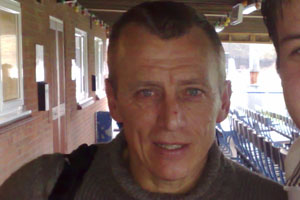
Tony Morley, one of the members of the Villa side that won the First Division championship in the 1980–81 season

In the 1977–78 season Villa reached the quarter-final of the UEFA Cup where they went out 4–3 on aggregate against Barcelona. In the domestic league, however, they struggled, and Saunders started rebuilding the team. As he began the restructuring in the summer of 1979, there were more changes in the boardroom. Doug Ellis tabled a resolution to have several directors removed from the board. It was unsuccessful, and Ellis resigned from the board. Meanwhile, Saunders signed several new players who were to become some of Villa's most prolific players in terms of goals and appearances. Allan Evans, Ken McNaught and Kenny Swain were brought into the defence, and Des Bremner was brought into the midfield to play alongside Dennis Mortimer and Gordon Cowans. Tony Morley and Gary Shaw were the new strike partnership. When Peter Withe was signed from Newcastle United in the summer of 1980, Saunders had built a team that saw much success over the next few years.

Its first success was in the 1980–81 season. Villa won their first League Championship in 71 years, fighting off competition from Liverpool and Ipswich Town using only 14 playing staff in the season. The title was sealed the last day of Villa's season when they lost 2–0 at Arsenal but still finished top as Ipswich Town, the only side still in contention for the title, lost to Middlesbrough. This triumph was popularly known as the "transistor championship" as Villa fans had turned up at the game listening to the progress of the Ipswich game on their Transistor radios.

The following season Villa did not start well and were in mid-table at Christmas, although the club was still in the European Cup. In the first round Villa beat Valur 7–0 on aggregate. In the second round they scored twice at BFC Dynamo to achieve a 2–2 draw, which saw them go through due to the away goals rule. These victories contrasted with their poor performance in the league. By February 1982, the club were lying 19th in the First Division and Saunders resigned. It was later disclosed that the then chair, Ron Bendall, had offered him a revised, short-term contract, which he had refused to accept. Saunders' assistant Tony Barton was promoted in his place. When Barton took over, although Villa were in a poor league position, they were in the quarter-final of the European Cup. In the quarter-finals, they beat Dynamo Kiev over two legs. Gordon Cowans is quoted as saying, "Once we got past Dynamo Kiev we began thinking we could go all the way." In the semi-final, they played Anderlecht over two legs, with Tony Morley scoring to secure Aston Villa's place in the final.

== European Champions and subsequent decline ==
On 26 May 1982, just three months after being appointed manager, Barton guided Villa to a 1–0 victory over Bayern Munich in the European Cup final in Rotterdam. As of November 2020, Villa remain one of only five English teams to have won the European Cup, along with Chelsea, Liverpool, Manchester United and Nottingham Forest. They were the underdogs in the final and were expected to lose.

The final was held in Feyenoord Stadium, Rotterdam, with an attendance of 39,776. Only nine minutes into the game, Villa lost their experienced goalkeeper Jimmy Rimmer to a shoulder injury. He was replaced by 23-year-old reserve goalkeeper Nigel Spink, who had only played one match for the club in five years since joining from Chelmsford. Spink made one of his best performances for the club against the highly experienced Bayern strike force, which included Karl-Heinz Rummenigge. Other key players in this Villa side included Tony Morley, Gordon Cowans and Dennis Mortimer.

The win was not followed with more success, and the team performed badly in the following seasons. At the annual general meeting in October 1982, it was revealed that the club were £1.6 million in debt, mainly due to escalating wages and building costs, including the construction of the North Stand. At the end of November Ron and Donald Bendall resigned from the board to be replaced by Doug Ellis, who bought Ron Bendall's 42% shareholding. In January 1983, Villa beat Barcelona 3–1 on aggregate to win the 1982 UEFA Super Cup. Barton remained in charge for two seasons after the European Cup triumph, but was sacked at the end of the 1983–84 season, despite Villa finishing tenth in the First Division and reaching the semi-finals of the League Cup. Shrewsbury Town manager Graham Turner was brought in as his successor. He was unable to reverse the decline, and in 1986 Villa narrowly avoided relegation to the Second Division. A lacklustre start to the following season saw Turner sacked halfway through September. Billy McNeill was hired in his place but was unable to save Villa from relegation. They were relegated to the Second Division just five years after winning the European Cup. McNeill handed in his notice and moved to Celtic when the season ended. Ellis persuaded Watford manager Graham Taylor to take over the reins and set about rebuilding the team.

== Taylor, Vengloš and Atkinson ==
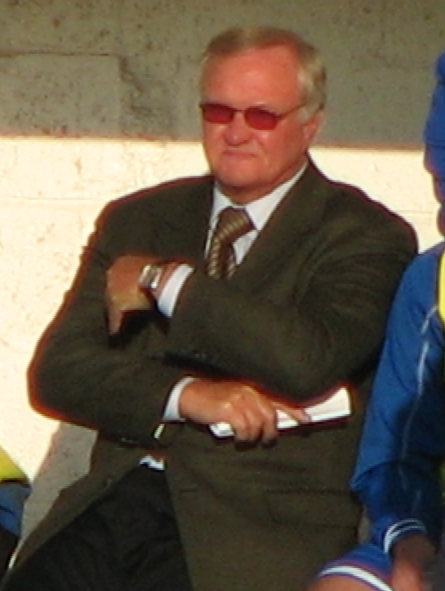
Ron Atkinson, who guided Villa to second place in the First Division in his first season with the club

Taylor's first season at Villa ended with automatic promotion as Second Division runners-up, being pipped to the title by Millwall. One player who contributed to that season's success was the recently signed David Platt, a former Manchester United reserve who had signed from Crewe Alexandra for £200,000 just after Taylor's arrival. Before he left in 1991, Platt scored 68 goals in his 155 appearances for the club. Villa avoided relegation the last day of the 1988–89 season as other results favoured them. In the 1989–90 season they emerged as surprise contenders for the title, leading for three weeks in the latter stages of the season before finishing in second place, nine points behind Liverpool. Taylor departed for the England manager's job and was succeeded by Slovak coach Jozef Vengloš, the first foreign manager in the First Division.

The 1990–91 season was Vengloš's only season as manager of Aston Villa. Their second-place finish the previous season earned them qualification for the UEFA Cup as one of the first English clubs to enter European competition after the ban resulting from the Heysel Stadium disaster was lifted. They beat first round opponents Baník Ostrava over two legs, and won the first leg of the second round tie against Inter Milan. However, this lead was overturned by Inter in the return leg 3–0 and Villa were eliminated. The defeat started a decline, and by the end of the season they were two places above the relegation zone. Vengloš stepped down and David Platt was sold to Italian side Bari for £5 million. The team's new manager was Ron Atkinson, who had taken West Bromwich Albion to the quarter-finals of the UEFA Cup and had won the League Cup with Sheffield Wednesday. In his first season in charge, 1991–92, Villa finished in sixth place and thus became one of the founder members of the FA Premier League.

== Villa in the Premier League ==
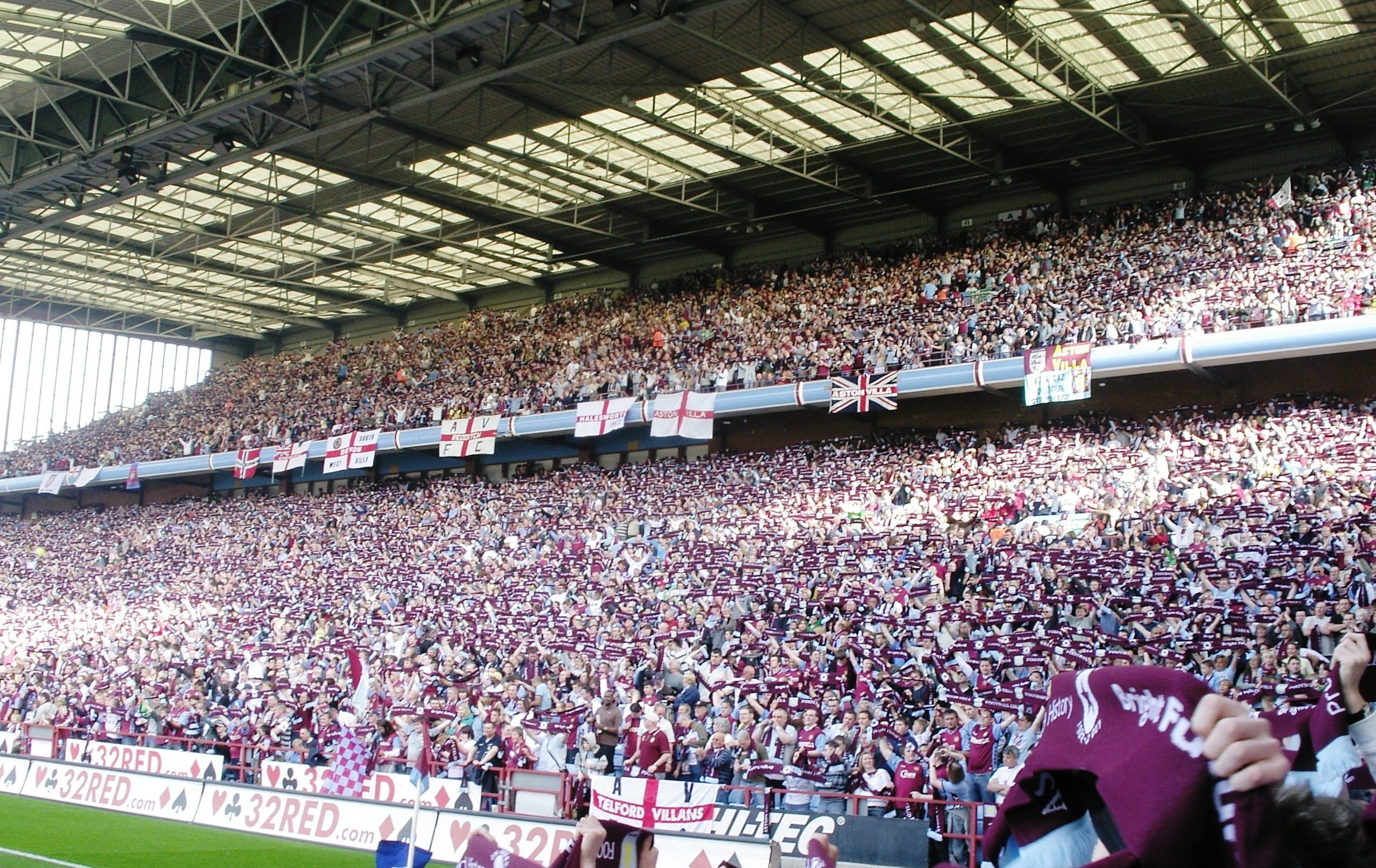
The Holte End was converted into an all-seater stand in 1994.

In his first 18 months in charge, Atkinson bought Earl Barrett, Dean Saunders, Andy Townsend, Dalian Atkinson, Kevin Richardson, Ray Houghton and Shaun Teale. They helped the club to finish as runners-up to Manchester United in the inaugural Premier League season of 1992–93. The strike partnership of Saunders and Atkinson established itself as one of the most successful partnerships in the Premiership. On 27 March 1994 Villa won the League Cup final 3–1, to secure a second successive UEFA Cup campaign, although their Premier League form dipped and they finished 10th. At the end of the 1993–94 season, they played their last game at a terraced Villa Park before it was converted over the summer to an all-seater stadium to comply with the Taylor Report. In November 1994, Atkinson was dismissed following a poor start to the season.

Leicester City's manager Brian Little was forbidden to speak to Aston Villa by his board, after rumours began circulating that Ellis wanted to hire him. Although maintaining he had not spoken to Ellis about the possibility of taking over at Villa, Little resigned from his post at Leicester even though he was contracted to the club until the end of the 1997–98 season. Three days after his resignation, Ellis hired him as the new Villa manager. Little kept Villa in the Premiership, and then reshaped the squad in the 1995 close-season by selling most of the club's older players and buying several younger ones. Villa won the 1996 League Cup with a win over Leeds United, reached the FA Cup semi-finals, and finished fourth in the Premiership in the 1995–96 season. In February 1998, with Villa standing 15th in the Premiership, and speculation rife that he would be sacked, Little resigned, stating that, "There were certain things going on behind the scenes which were affecting my own managerial position." Ellis came out with a statement directly challenging that it had anything to do with the management at Villa Park. Instead, he suggested it was due to a "variety of pressures" including abuse directed towards Little and his family by irate fans.

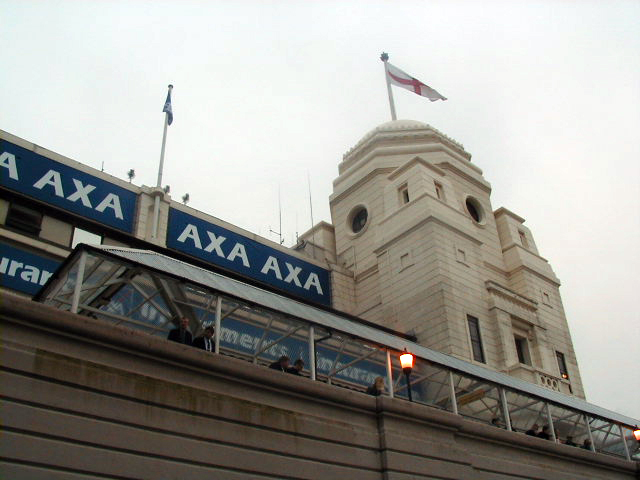
Aston Villa played Chelsea in the last FA Cup Final to be held at the old Wembley Stadium.

Ellis appointed John Gregory, a former Aston Villa coach, as Little's successor. He revitalised the team, and Villa finished seventh in the Premiership and qualified for the UEFA Cup. Usually, only the top six teams qualified for European competition, but due to the progress of other teams in the top seven it was the first time that a seventh placed club had automatically qualified for the UEFA Cup. Despite the £12.6 million sale of Dwight Yorke, a player who had scored 97 goals in 287 appearances for the club, to Manchester United in August 1998, John Gregory had guided Aston Villa to the top of the Premiership by the middle of the 1998–99 season. Villa reached the FA Cup final in 2000 for the first time since 1957, but lost 1–0 to Chelsea in the last final played at the old Wembley Stadium. The 2000–01 season saw Villa finish eighth in the Premiership, although they did eventually qualify for the UEFA Cup by winning the Intertoto Cup in August 2001. In November 2001, Gregory accused Ellis of "living in a time-warp" but was forced to apologise a few days later after provoking an uproar. While Gregory remained in his job, the relationship between the two was strained. Gregory resigned on 24 January 2002, with Villa occupying a familiar mid-table position in the league.

In January 2002, Ellis once again appointed Graham Taylor as manager. Villa finished the 2001–02 season in eighth place, which was similar to most of their other Premiership finishes. Taylor quit as manager for the second time after the end of the 2002–03 season. Villa had just finished 16th in the Premiership, losing twice to arch rivals Birmingham City. David O'Leary, who had taken Leeds United to the semi-finals of the 2000–01 Champions League, was brought in as Taylor's replacement. He took the team to sixth in the table, with a 2–0 home defeat against Manchester United on the final day meaning that they narrowly missed out on a UEFA Cup place. In 2005–06, Villa slowly fell down the table and finished in 16th place. The poor placing came despite O'Leary having spent more than £13 million the previous summer on players like as Milan Baroš, Kevin Phillips and Wilfred Bouma.

Frustration within the club soon reared its head when, on 14 July 2006, a group of Villa players criticised Ellis's alleged parsimony and lack of ambition in an interview with a local newspaper. The club immediately dismissed the report as "ridiculous", but it emerged over the following few days that a group of senior players had indeed instigated the move, possibly with O'Leary's backing. The following week, O'Leary left the club by mutual consent after three years as Aston Villa manager and his assistant Roy Aitken became caretaker manager.

== Lerner era ==
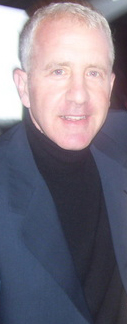
Aston Villa's former chair Randy Lerner

At a press conference on 4 August 2006, Doug Ellis introduced Martin O'Neill as the new manager. O'Neill described his position as a "fantastic challenge" saying he wanted "to restore [the team] to its days of former glory".

After several years of speculation and failed bids, the 23-year reign of Doug Ellis as chair came to an end. Ellis, the largest shareholder with approximately 38%, decided to sell his stake. For many years supporters' groups had urged him to resign, though the actions including two "Ellis out" protests, and an "Ellis out" march marked an increase in intensity. The decision to leave the club was likely prompted by Ellis' ill-health. Randy Lerner, owner of the NFL franchise Cleveland Browns, was announced as the preferred bidder. On 25 August, it was announced that he had secured 59.69% of the club's shares. By 26 September 2006, he had achieved a 90% shareholding and could complete his buy-out of the rest of the shares. Lerner appointed several new people to the board including General Charles C Krulak. Ellis was given a President Emeritus (Life President) role.

The arrival of a new owner and manager marked the start of sweeping changes throughout the club. This included a new crest, a new kit sponsor and new players in the summer of 2007. Aston Villa started the 2006–07 Premiership campaign well, with Olof Mellberg scoring the first competitive goal at Arsenal's new Emirates Stadium. The January signings of John Carew, Ashley Young and Shaun Maloney bolstered the squad. Villa finished in 11th place in the league with 50 points, ending the season with an unbeaten run of nine league games. The last home game of the season, a 3–0 victory over Sheffield United was used to mark the 25th anniversary of Villa winning the European Cup in 1982. Before kick-off, the 1982 winning team paraded the trophy in front of a full stadium. Scarves bearing the words "Proud History—Bright Future" were given out to all home team supporters attending the match.

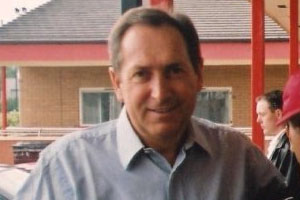
Gérard Houllier, manager 2010–11 – see List of Aston Villa F.C. managers

2007–08 saw Villa progress further, finishing sixth to qualify for the Intertoto Cup. A victory against Danish side Odense BK, over two legs in the final during the summer of 2008, put Villa into European competition for the 2008–09 season for the first time in seven years. They reached the group stage of the UEFA Cup that season with relative ease, and played their first match against Dutch club Ajax at Villa Park, winning 2–1. The first major final of the Lerner era was the 2010 Football League Cup Final; Villa lost 2–1 to Manchester United at Wembley Stadium. Five days before the opening day of the 2010–11 season, O'Neill resigned as manager with immediate effect. The reserve team coach, Kevin MacDonald, took over as caretaker manager for the opening games of the season. Randy Lerner returned to England from the United States to interview potential candidates for the post. On 8 September 2010, the club announced Gérard Houllier would become the manager of Aston Villa, the first managerial appointment of Lerner's reign. On 20 April 2011, Houllier was admitted to hospital suffering from chest pains. Further tests showed he had suffered from a recurrence of a heart problem. The last games of the season saw his assistant, Gary McAllister, take over in a caretaker capacity. On 1 June 2011, the club issued a statement that Houllier had left the club by mutual consent leaving it looking for their fifth manager, including caretakers, of the year. Houllier was replaced by the former Birmingham City manager Alex McLeish on 17 June 2011, despite numerous protests from fans against his appointment. His appointment marked the first time in history that a manager had moved directly from Birmingham to Villa.

McLeish's contract was terminated at the end of the 2011–12 season after Villa finished in 16th place, only just above the relegation zone. On 2 July 2012, Aston Villa confirmed the appointment of former Norwich City manager Paul Lambert as McLeish's replacement. On 28 February 2012, the club announced a financial loss of £53.9 million. Lerner put the club up for sale on 12 May 2014, with an estimated value of £200 million. With Lerner still on board, in the 2014–15 season Aston Villa scored just 12 goals in 25 league games, the lowest in Premier League history, and Lambert was sacked on 11 February 2015. He was replaced by Tim Sherwood, who saved Villa from relegation in the 2014–15 season and took them to the 2015 FA Cup Final.

Despite saving them from relegation the previous season, Sherwood was fired on 15 October 2015, after six consecutive league losses, with Kevin MacDonald taking the role of interim manager. On 2 November 2015, Frenchman Rémi Garde agreed to a three-and-a-half-year deal to become the manager, but he left on 29 March 2016 with the club rooted to the bottom of the table. The club was eventually relegated from the Premier League on 16 April following a 1–0 defeat to Manchester United at Old Trafford.

== Tony Xia and Championship football ==
In June 2016, Chinese businessman Tony Xia bought the club for £76 million. Roberto Di Matteo was appointed as the club's new manager before the new season in the Championship. He was sacked after 12 games with the club in 19th place having only won one match against Rotherham. He was replaced by former Birmingham City manager Steve Bruce, however Bruce could only lead the club to 13th in the table that season.

In the 2017–18 season Bruce led Villa to a fourth place after their best winning sequence since 1990, including winning seven games in a row. Having qualified for the play-offs and beating Middlesbrough in the semi-final they ultimately lost 1–0 to Fulham in the 2018 EFL Championship play-off final at Wembley Stadium. Following the play-off final financial problems began to emerge with Xia struggling to move money out of China to maintain basic football operations. On 5 June 2018, Aston Villa missed the deadline for a £4 million tax bill, and the club was faced with a winding up order and the real possibility of going out of business. On 7 June 2018, Xia managed to negotiate an agreement with HM Revenue and Customs to pay £500,000 of the £4 million bill, promising to pay the remaining portion at a later date. This saved the club from immediate danger, but Xia confirmed that the club was still in significant financial difficulty and it became clear that the club were facing an existential threat if they did not acquire new ownership.

== Nassef Sawiris and Wes Edens takeover ==
In July 2018 Aston Villa were taken over by Nassef Sawiris and Wes Edens with a 55% controlling stake. They promised significant investment and restructuring of the club. In October 2018 they sacked Bruce with Villa sitting 12th in the table after 11 games. They appointed boyhood Villa fan Dean Smith. Under Smith performances and results improved, with a team record 10-game winning streak in March and April. The team finished 5th in the league and were in the playoffs for the second time in two seasons. They won the playoff final on 27 May 2019 over Derby County 2–1 to return to the Premier League after a three-year absence.

The club spent a net total of £144.5 million to bring in 12 players in the summer 2019 transfer window ahead of their Premier League return: Jota, Anwar El Ghazi, Wesley, Kortney Hause, Matt Targett, Tyrone Mings, Ezri Konsa, Björn Engels, Trézéguet, Douglas Luiz, Tom Heaton and Marvelous Nakamba. In the EFL Cup, Villa reached the final, losing 2–1 to Manchester City. In the league though, Villa were four points deep inside the relegation zone with four games left to play, but pulled off what Smith called a "magnificent achievement" to clinch survival on the last day with a 1–1 draw at West Ham United.

Villa continued to spend heavily the following season, notably signing Matty Cash, Ollie Watkins and Emiliano Martínez. Villa consolidated their Premier League status, finishing the season in 11th place.

The 2021–22 began with Villa breaking the British transfer record for a fee received, selling captain Jack Grealish to Manchester City for £100m and breaking their own record for a transfer fee paid, signing Emiliano Buendía for £33m from Norwich City. Smith's team started the season slowly, however, and in November 2021 Dean Smith was sacked after a run of 5 successive defeats. He was replaced by former Liverpool midfielder Steven Gerrard who had just won the Scottish Premiership in his first management job at Rangers, and saw the club win four of their next seven games which saw them close out the year in 11th place, five places above where the club were when Gerrard was appointed. The January transfer window saw Gerrard sign high profile names in Philippe Coutinho on loan from Barcelona, and Lucas Digne for £25m from Everton, but results in the new year were mixed with Villa winning three games in a row to Brighton, Southampton and Leeds, to then lose four games in a row to West Ham, Arsenal, Wolverhampton, and Tottenham. Villa finished the season in 14th place.

The 2022–23 season did not begin in better fashion, with summers signings Boubacar Kamara and Diego Carlos each suffering lengthy injuries early into the campaign, and Villa would win only one of their first six games. Gerrard was sacked in October 2022 after two wins in eleven games and Villa sitting in 17th place. On 24 October 2022, Villa appointed Unai Emery as head coach after paying a buyout fee of a reported €6 million (£5.2 million) to Villarreal, but due to work permit formalities, the appointment did not complete until 1 November. On 6 November, Emery won his first match in charge with a 3–1 win over Manchester United, Villa's first home Premier League victory against United since August 1995, and Villa would win fifteen of their twenty-five league games under Emery and 49 points from a possible 75 since his appointment during the 2022–23 campaign, also setting a new Premier League record for most number of games scored in at the start of a manager’s tenure at 20. 5 wins, 1 draw and 1 defeat in April 2023, led to Emery being awarded Premier League Manager of the Month. A 2-1 win over Brighton on the final matchday of the season secured Villa a 7th-place finish and qualification to the UEFA Europa Conference League, the club's first participation in European football since the 2010–11 season.

Aston Villa also saw a number of club records broken during Emery's first seven months in charge, including striker Ollie Watkins not only break the record for number of consecutive games scored in for a Villa player in the Premier League era with five, but also number of consecutive Premier League away games scored in at six, and Emiliano Martínez, with five clean sheets upon the league's restart after the 2022 FIFA World Cup break the record for number of clean sheets for an Aston Villa goalkeeper in his first 100 Premier League games for the club at 34. A 3–0 win against Newcastle United on 15 April 2023 saw Villa win five Premier League games in a row for the first time since 1998, and victory at Villa Park against Brighton on the final matchday not only meant The Villans’ first time winning seven consecutive league games at home since the 1992-93 season, but also their eighteenth league win of the season, fifteenth under Emery, for their joint-most league wins in a 38-game season.

After the end of the 2022–23 season, Aston Villa once again saw changes at the leadership level, with Christian Purslow departing from his role as CEO, his role being replaced by two people. Former Sevilla Director of Football Monchi arrived as President of Football Operations, overseeing recruitment and footballing activities and working closely with Unai Emery. Meanwhile, former Philadelphia 76ers President Chris Heck as President of Business Operations. The new leadership oversaw a summer of recruitment which saw Aston VIlla break its transfer record with the signing of French winger Moussa Diaby from Bayer Leverkusen for a reported £51.9m fee.
