= 1982–83 Aston Villa F.C. season =

English football club season

Aston Villa
1982–83 season
- Chairman: Doug Ellis
- Manager: Tony Barton
- Stadium: Villa Park
- First Division: 6th
- European Super Cup: Winners
- FA Cup: Sixth round
- League Cup: Second round
- European Cup: Quarter-finals
- Intercontinental Cup: Runners-up
- Top goalscorer: League: Peter Withe (16 goals); All: Peter Withe (18 goals)

Second City Derby
- 39--29--25

The 1982–83 English football season was Aston Villa's 4th season in Europe and 84th season in the Football League. Villa competed in the Football League First Division. Tony Barton was manager after Ron Saunders had resigned in the previous season. Villa qualified for the European Cup as holders and reaching the quarter-finals, and also won the European Super Cup in a two-legged contest with FC Barcelona of Spain. They finished the season sixth in the league.

There were debuts for Alan Curbishley (36) and Ray Walker (23).

== European Super Cup ==
19 January 1983 First leg	Barcelona (Spain)	1–0	(England) Aston Villa	Camp Nou, Barcelona
20:45 CET	Marcos Alonso 52'	Report		Attendance: 40,000; Referee: Bruno Galler (Switzerland)

26 January 1983 Second leg	Aston Villa (England)	3–0 (a.e.t.) (3–1 agg.)	(Spain) Barcelona	Villa Park, Birmingham
19:30 GMT	Shaw 80'; Cowans 100'; McNaught 104'	Report		Attendance: 31,570; Referee: Alexis Ponnet (Belgium)

== First Division ==
Pos	Team	Pld	W	D	L	GF	GA	GD	Pts	Qualification or relegation
4	Tottenham Hotspur	42	20	9	13	65	50	+15	69	Qualification for the UEFA Cup first round
5	Nottingham Forest	42	20	9	13	62	50	+12	69	Qualification for the UEFA Cup first round
6	Aston Villa	42	21	5	16	62	50	+12	68	Qualification for the UEFA Cup first round
7	Everton	42	18	10	14	66	48	+18	64	
8	West Ham United	42	20	4	18	68	62	+6	64	

Source: World Football
Rules for classification: 1) Points; 2) Goal difference; 3) Goals scored

=== Matches ===
28 August 1982	Aston Villa	1–3	Sunderland	Villa Park
	Gordon Cowans	Report

31 August 1982	Everton	5–0	Aston Villa	Goodison Park
		Report

4 September 1982	Southampton	1–0	Aston Villa	The Dell
		Report

8 September 1982	Aston Villa	4–1	Luton Town	Villa Park
	Dennis Mortimer, Peter Withe, Gordon Cowans (2)	Report

11 September 1982	Aston Villa	4–1	Nottingham Forest	Villa Park
	Dennis Mortimer, Peter Withe (2), Gordon Cowans	Report

18 September 1982	Manchester City	0–1	Aston Villa	Maine Road
		Report	Gary Shaw 36'

25 September 1982	Aston Villa	2–0	Swansea City	Villa Park
	Dennis Mortimer 32', Allan Evans 45'	Report

2 October 1982	West Bromwich Albion	1–0	Aston Villa	The Hawthorns
		Report

16 October 1982	Aston Villa	3–0	Watford	Villa Park
	Peter Withe 28', Tony Morley 58', 89'	Report

23 October 1982	Norwich City	1–0	Aston Villa	Carrow Road
		Report

30 October 1982	Aston Villa	4–0	Tottenham Hotspur	Villa Park
		Report

6 November 1982	Coventry City	0–0	Aston Villa	Highfield Road
		Report

13 November 1982	Aston Villa	1–0	Brighton & Hove Albion	Villa Park
		Report

20 November 1982	Aston Villa	2–1	Manchester United	Villa Park
		Report

27 November 1982	Stoke City	0–3	Aston Villa	Victoria Ground
		Report

4 December 1982	Aston Villa	1–0	West Ham United	Villa Park
		Report

7 December 1982	Arsenal	2–1	Aston Villa	Highbury
		Report

19 December 1982	Aston Villa	2–4	Liverpool	Villa Park
		Report

27 December 1982	Birmingham City	3–0	Aston Villa	St Andrew's
		Report

29 December 1982	Aston Villa	1–1	Ipswich Town	Villa Park
		Report

1 January 1983	Manchester United	3–1	Aston Villa	Old Trafford
		Report

3 January 1983	Aston Villa	2–0	Southampton	Villa Park
		Report

15 January 1983	Sunderland	2–0	Aston Villa	Roker Park
		Report

22 January 1983	Aston Villa	1–1	Manchester City	Villa Park
		Report

5 February 1983	Nottingham Forest	1–2	Aston Villa	City Ground
		Report	Peter Withe (2)

12 February 1983	Aston Villa	2–0	Everton	Villa Park
	Tony Morley, Peter Withe	Report

26 February 1983	Watford	2–1	Aston Villa	Vicarage Road
		Report	Mark Walters

5 March 1983	Aston Villa	3–2	Norwich City	Villa Park
	Peter Withe, Eamonn Deacy, Gary Shaw	Report

8 March 1983	Aston Villa	2–0	Notts County	Villa Park
	Peter Withe, Gary Shaw	Report

19 March 1983	Aston Villa	4–0	Coventry City	Villa Park
	Gary Shaw, Peter Withe (2), Allan Evans	Report

23 March 1983	Tottenham Hotspur	2–0	Aston Villa	White Hart Lane
		Report

26 March 1983	Brighton & Hove Albion	0–0	Aston Villa	Goldstone Ground
		Report

2 April 1983	Ipswich Town	1–2	Aston Villa	Portman Road
		Report	Gary Shaw, Peter Withe

4 April 1983	Aston Villa	1–0	Birmingham City	Villa Park
	Gary Shaw	Report

9 April 1983	Luton Town	2–1	Aston Villa	Kenilworth Road
		Report	Gary Shaw

19 April 1983	Aston Villa	1–0	West Bromwich Albion	Villa Park
	Dennis Mortimer	Report

23 April 1983	West Ham United	2–0	Aston Villa	Boleyn Ground
		Report

30 April 1983	Aston Villa	4–0	Stoke City	Villa Park
	Gordon Cowans, Ken McNaught, Tony Morley, Allan Evans	Report

2 May 1983	Swansea City	2–1	Aston Villa	Vetch Field
		Report	Gary Shaw

7 May 1983	Liverpool	1–1	Aston Villa	Anfield
		Report	Gary Shaw (pen)

14 May 1983	Aston Villa	2–1	Arsenal	Villa Park
	Gary Shaw, Colin Gibson	Report

Source: avfchistory.co.uk

== Intercontinental Cup ==
12 December 1982	Aston Villa (England)	0–2	(Uruguay) Peñarol	Tokyo
		Report	Jair 27'; Silva 68'	Stadium: National Stadium; Attendance: 63,000; Referee: Luis Paulino Siles (Costa Rica)

== European Cup ==
Aston Villa played in 1982–83 European Cup as champions. The club reached the quarter-finals but lost to eventual runners-up Juventus of Italy.

=== First round ===
15 September 1982 First leg	Aston Villa (England)	3–1	(Turkey) Beşiktaş	Villa Park, Birmingham
	Morley 6'; Withe 9'; Mortimer 29'	Report	Ekşi 61'	Referee:

29 September 1982 Second leg	Beşiktaş (Turkey)	0–0 (1–3 agg.)	(England) Aston Villa
				Referee:

=== Second round ===
20 October 1982 First leg	Dinamo Bucuresti (Romania)	0–2	(England) Aston Villa
			Shaw 11', 17'	Referee:

3 November 1982 Second leg	Aston Villa (England)	4–2 (6–2 agg.)	(Romania) Dinamo Bucuresti	Villa Park, Birmingham
	Shaw 5', 52', 67'; Walters 87'		Mulţescu 30'; Iordache 71'	Referee:

=== Quarter-final ===
7 March 1983 First leg	Aston Villa (England)	1–2	(Italy) Juventus	Villa Park, Birmingham
	Cowans 53'		Rossi 1'; Boniek 82'	Referee:

16 March 1983 Second leg	Juventus (Italy)	3–1 (5–2 agg.)	(England) Aston Villa
	Platini 14', 68'; Tardelli 27'		Withe 81'	Referee:

== FA Cup ==
=== Third round ===
Teams from the Football League First and Second Division entered in this round. The third round of games in the FA Cup were played on 8 January 1983. Replays took place over 11–12 January, with a second replay on the 24th. Bishop's Stortford, from the Isthmian League Premier Division (Step 6), was the lowest-ranked team in the round while Worcester City, Weymouth and Bishop's Stortford were the last non-league clubs left in the competition.

Tie no	Home team	Score	Away team	Date
15	Northampton Town (4)	0–1	Aston Villa (1)	8 January 1983

=== Fourth round ===
The fourth round of games were mainly played over the weekend 29 –30 January 1983. Some games were replayed on 1–2 February, with a second replay on 9 February. Swindon Town and Torquay United from the Fourth Division were the lowest-ranked teams in the round and the last clubs from the First Round left in the competition.

Tie no	Home team	Score	Away team	Date
4	Aston Villa	1–0	Wolverhampton Wanderers	29 January 1983

=== Fifth round ===
The fifth set of games were all played on 19–20 February 1983. Two replays were played on 28 February. Holders Tottenham Hotspur were eliminated by Everton – their first defeat in the competition since March 1980. However, because both Everton and Liverpool were drawn to play at home in this round, there was one game played on Sunday 20 February: Liverpool v Brighton with Everton v Tottenham on the same day as the other R5 ties

Tie no	Home team	Score	Away team	Date
2	Aston Villa	4–1	Watford	19 February 1983

=== Sixth round ===
The sixth round of FA Cup games were played on 12 March 1983 with a replay on the 15 March.

Tie no	Home team	Score	Away team	Date
4	Arsenal	2–0	Aston Villa	12 March 1983

== League Cup ==
=== Second round ===
First leg

Home team	Score	Away team	Date
Aston Villa	1–2	Notts County	6 October 1982

Second leg

Home team	Score	Away team	Date	Agg
Notts County	1–0	Aston Villa	26 October 1982	3–1

== See also ==
- List of Aston Villa F.C. records and statistics
