= Aston Villa F.C. in international football =

English club in international football

Aston Villa F.C. in European football
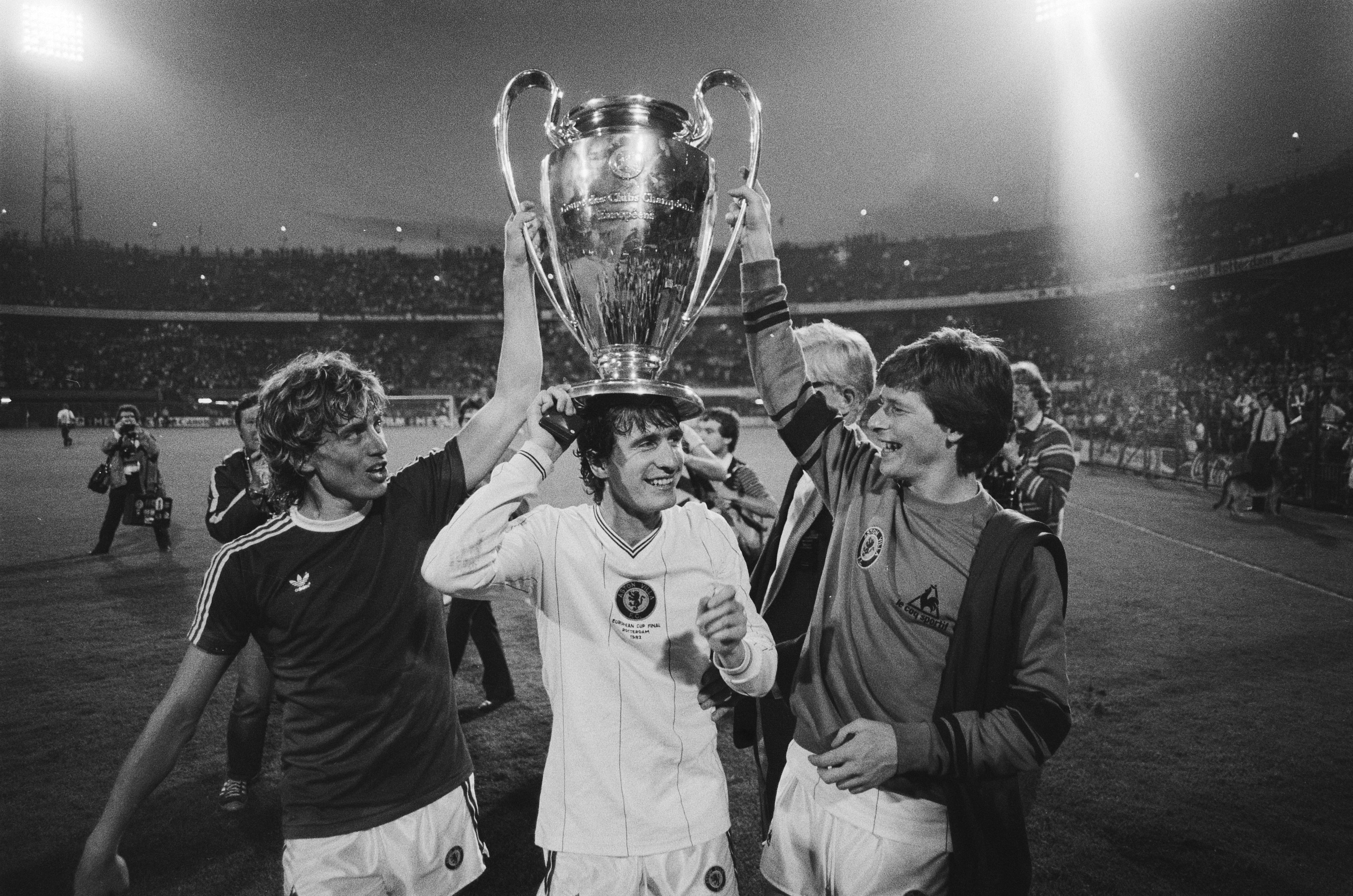
- Aston Villa celebrating their historic 1981–82 European Cup victory
- Club: Aston Villa
- Seasons played: 19
- First entry: 1975–76 UEFA Cup
- Latest entry: 2026–27 UEFA Champions League

Titles
- Champions League: 1982
- Europa League: 2026
- Intertoto Cup: 2001
- Super Cup: 1982

Aston Villa Football Club is a professional football club, based in Birmingham. The club first played in Europe in the UEFA Cup in the 1975–76 season, losing in the first round to Antwerp, with their first match being a 4–1 loss on 17 September 1975. Aston Villa are one of the six clubs from England to have won the European Cup, winning in 1982, beating Bayern Munich in the final, after winning the 1980–81 English First Division. In the same year, they won the 1982 European Super Cup against 1982 Cup Winners' Cup champions, Barcelona, and played in the 1982 Intercontinental Cup, against Copa Libertadores holders, Peñarol, although they lost this 2–0. Aston Villa was also one of the winners of the 2001 Intertoto Cup, and won the 2025–26 UEFA Europa League. Aston Villa has played in nineteen seasons of UEFA competitions, although the 2024–25 Champions League was the club's first participation in a first-tier European competition since the 1982–83 European Cup.

== Record by competition ==
Competition	Record							
Competition	Pld	W	D	L	GF	GA	GD	Win %
European Cup/UEFA Champions League	30	20	4	6	59	25	+34	66.67
UEFA Cup/UEFA Europa League	72	37	15	20	110	67	+43	51.39
UEFA Europa Conference League	14	8	2	4	29	16	+13	57.14
UEFA Intertoto Cup	16	6	4	6	21	17	+4	37.50
UEFA Super Cup	3	1	0	2	4	3	+1	33.33
Intercontinental Cup	1	0	0	1	0	2	−2	0.00
Total	136	72	25	39	223	130	+93	52.94

Last updated: 21 October 2026
Source: UEFA.com

== List of matches ==
Season	Competition	Round	Country	Opponent	Home	Away	Agg.
1975–76	UEFA Cup	1R	Belgium	Antwerp	0–1	1–4	1–5
1977–78	UEFA Cup	1R	Turkey	Fenerbahçe	4–0	2–0	6–0
1977–78	UEFA Cup	2R	Poland	Górnik Zabrze	2–0	1–1	3–1
1977–78	UEFA Cup	3R	Spain	Athletic Bilbao	2–0	1–1	3–1
1977–78	UEFA Cup	QF	Spain	Barcelona	2–2	1–2	3–4
1981–82	European Cup (winners)	1R	Iceland	Valur	5–0	2–0	7–0
1981–82	European Cup (winners)	2R	East Germany	Dynamo Berlin	0–1	2–1	2–2 (a)
1981–82	European Cup (winners)	QF	Soviet Union	Dynamo Kyiv	2–0	0–0	2–0
1981–82	European Cup (winners)	SF	Belgium	Anderlecht	1–0	0–0	1–0
1981–82	European Cup (winners)	F	West Germany	Bayern Munich	1–0		
1982–83	European Super Cup (winners)	F	Spain	Barcelona	3–0	0–1	3–1
1982–83	Intercontinental Cup	F	Uruguay	Peñarol	0–2		
1982–83	European Cup	1R	Turkey	Beşiktaş	3–1	0–0	3–1
1982–83	European Cup	2R	Romania	Dinamo București	4–2	2–0	6–2
1982–83	European Cup	QF	Italy	Juventus	1–2	1–3	2–5
1983–84	UEFA Cup	1R	Portugal	Vitória de Guimarães	5–0	0–1	5–1
1983–84	UEFA Cup	2R	Soviet Union	Spartak Moscow	1–2	2–2	3–4
1990–91	UEFA Cup	1R	Czechoslovakia	Baník Ostrava	3–1	2–1	5–2
1990–91	UEFA Cup	2R	Italy	Inter Milan	2–0	0–3	2–3
1993–94	UEFA Cup	1R	Slovakia	Slovan Bratislava	2–1	0–0	2–1
1993–94	UEFA Cup	2R	Spain	Deportivo La Coruña	0–1	1–1	1–2
1994–95	UEFA Cup	1R	Italy	Inter Milan	1–0 (a.e.t.)	0–1	1–1 (4–3 p)
1994–95	UEFA Cup	2R	Turkey	Trabzonspor	2–1	0–1	2–2 (a)
1996–97	UEFA Cup	1R	Sweden	Helsingborg	1–1	0–0	1–1 (a)
1997–98	UEFA Cup	1R	France	Bordeaux	1–0	0–0	1–0
1997–98	UEFA Cup	2R	Spain	Athletic Bilbao	2–1	0–0	2–1
1997–98	UEFA Cup	3R	Romania	Steaua București	2–0	1–2	3–2
1997–98	UEFA Cup	QF	Spain	Atlético Madrid	2–1	0–1	2–2 (a)
1998–99	UEFA Cup	1R	Norway	Strømsgodset	3–2	3–0	6–2
1998–99	UEFA Cup	2R	Spain	Celta Vigo	1–3	1–0	2–3
2000–01	Intertoto Cup	3R	Czech Republic	Dukla Příbram	3–1	0–0	3–1
2000–01	Intertoto Cup	SF	Spain	Celta Vigo	1–2	0–1	1–3
2001–02	Intertoto Cup (winners)	3R	Croatia	Slaven Belupo	2–0	1–2	3–2
2001–02	Intertoto Cup (winners)	SF	France	Rennes	1–0	2–1	3–1
2001–02	Intertoto Cup (winners)	F	Switzerland	Basel	4–1	1–1	5–2
2001–02	UEFA Cup	1R	Croatia	Varteks	2–3	1–0	3–3 (a)
2002–03	Intertoto Cup	3R	Switzerland	Zürich	3–0	0–2	3–2
2002–03	Intertoto Cup	SF	France	Lille	0–2	1–1	1–3
2008–09	Intertoto Cup (co-winners)	3R	Denmark	Odense	1–0	2–2	3–2
2008–09	UEFA Cup	2QR	Iceland	FH	1–1	4–1	5–2
2008–09	UEFA Cup	1R	Bulgaria	Litex Lovech	1–1	3–1	4–2
2008–09	UEFA Cup	GS	Netherlands	Ajax	2–1	—N/a	—N/a
2008–09	UEFA Cup	GS	Czech Republic	Slavia Prague	—N/a	1–0	—N/a
2008–09	UEFA Cup	GS	Slovakia	Žilina	1–2	—N/a	—N/a
2008–09	UEFA Cup	GS	Germany	Hamburger SV	—N/a	1–3	—N/a
2008–09	UEFA Cup	R32	Russia	CSKA Moscow	1–1	0–2	1–3
2009–10	Europa League	P/O	Austria	Rapid Wien	2–1	0–1	2–2 (a)
2010–11	Europa League	P/O	Austria	Rapid Wien	2–3	1–1	3–4
2023–24	Europa Conference League	P/O	Scotland	Hibernian	3–0	5–0	8–0
2023–24	Europa Conference League	GS	Poland	Legia Warsaw	2–1	2–3	—N/a
2023–24	Europa Conference League	GS	Bosnia and Herzegovina	Zrinjski Mostar	1–0	1–1	—N/a
2023–24	Europa Conference League	GS	Netherlands	AZ	2–1	4–1	—N/a
2023–24	Europa Conference League	R16	Netherlands	Ajax	4–0	0–0	4–0
2023–24	Europa Conference League	QF	France	Lille	2–1	1–2 (a.e.t.)	3–3 (4–3 p)
2023–24	Europa Conference League	SF	Greece	Olympiacos	2–4	0–2	2–6
2024–25	Champions League	LP	Switzerland	Young Boys	—N/a	3–0	—N/a
2024–25	Champions League	LP	Germany	Bayern Munich	1–0	—N/a	—N/a
2024–25	Champions League	LP	Italy	Bologna	2–0	—N/a	—N/a
2024–25	Champions League	LP	Belgium	Club Brugge	—N/a	0–1	—N/a
2024–25	Champions League	LP	Italy	Juventus	0–0	—N/a	—N/a
2024–25	Champions League	LP	Germany	RB Leipzig	—N/a	3–2	—N/a
2024–25	Champions League	LP	France	Monaco	—N/a	0–1	—N/a
2024–25	Champions League	LP	Scotland	Celtic	4–2	—N/a	—N/a
2024–25	Champions League	R16	Belgium	Club Brugge	3–0	3–1	6–1
2024–25	Champions League	QF	France	Paris Saint-Germain	3–2	1–3	4–5
2025–26	Europa League (winners)	LP	Italy	Bologna	1–0	—N/a	—N/a
2025–26	Europa League (winners)	LP	Netherlands	Feyenoord	—N/a	2–0	—N/a
2025–26	Europa League (winners)	LP	Netherlands	Go Ahead Eagles	—N/a	1–2	—N/a
2025–26	Europa League (winners)	LP	Israel	Maccabi Tel Aviv	2–0	—N/a	—N/a
2025–26	Europa League (winners)	LP	Switzerland	Young Boys	2–1	—N/a	—N/a
2025–26	Europa League (winners)	LP	Switzerland	Basel	—N/a	2–1	—N/a
2025–26	Europa League (winners)	LP	Turkey	Fenerbahçe	—N/a	1–0	—N/a
2025–26	Europa League (winners)	LP	Austria	Red Bull Salzburg	3–2	—N/a	—N/a
2025–26	Europa League (winners)	R16	France	Lille	2–0	1–0	3–0
2025–26	Europa League (winners)	QF	Italy	Bologna	4–0	3–1	7–1
2025–26	Europa League (winners)	SF	England	Nottingham Forest	4–0	0–1	4–1
2025–26	Europa League (winners)	F	Germany	SC Freiburg	3–0		
2026–27	UEFA Super Cup	F	France	Paris Saint-Germain	1–2		
2026–27	Champions League	LP	Belgium	Club Brugge	—N/a	3–2	—N/a
2026–27	Champions League	LP	Turkey	Fenerbahçe	6–0	—N/a	—N/a
2026–27	Champions League	LP	Norway	Viking	3–1	—N/a	—N/a
2026–27	Champions League	LP	Spain	Barcelona	—N/a		—N/a
2026–27	Champions League	LP	Turkey	Galatasaray	—N/a		—N/a
2026–27	Champions League	LP	France	Paris Saint-Germain		—N/a	—N/a
2026–27	Champions League	LP	Germany	Borussia Dortmund		—N/a	—N/a
2026–27	Champions League	LP	Czech Republic	Slavia Prague	—N/a		—N/a

Key

- 2QR = Second qualifying round
- P/O = Play-off round
- 1R = First round
- 2R = Second round
- 3R = Third round
- GS = Group stage
- LP = League phase
- R32 = Round of 32
- R16 = Round of 16
- QF = Quarter-finals
- SF = Semi-finals
- F = Final
