= 1982 Intercontinental Cup =

Aston Villa	Peñarol
(England)	(Uruguay)
0	2
- Date: 12 December 1982
- Venue: National Stadium, Tokyo
- Man of the Match: Jair (Peñarol)
- Referee: Luis Paulino Siles (Costa Rica)
- Attendance: 63,000

The 1982 Intercontinental Cup was an association football match played on 12 December 1982 between Aston Villa, winners of the 1981–82 European Cup, and Peñarol, winners of the 1982 Copa Libertadores. The match was played at the National Stadium in Tokyo. It was Aston Villa's first appearance into the competition, whereas it was Peñarol's fourth appearance after the victories in 1961 and 1966, and the defeat in 1960.

Jair was named as man of the match.

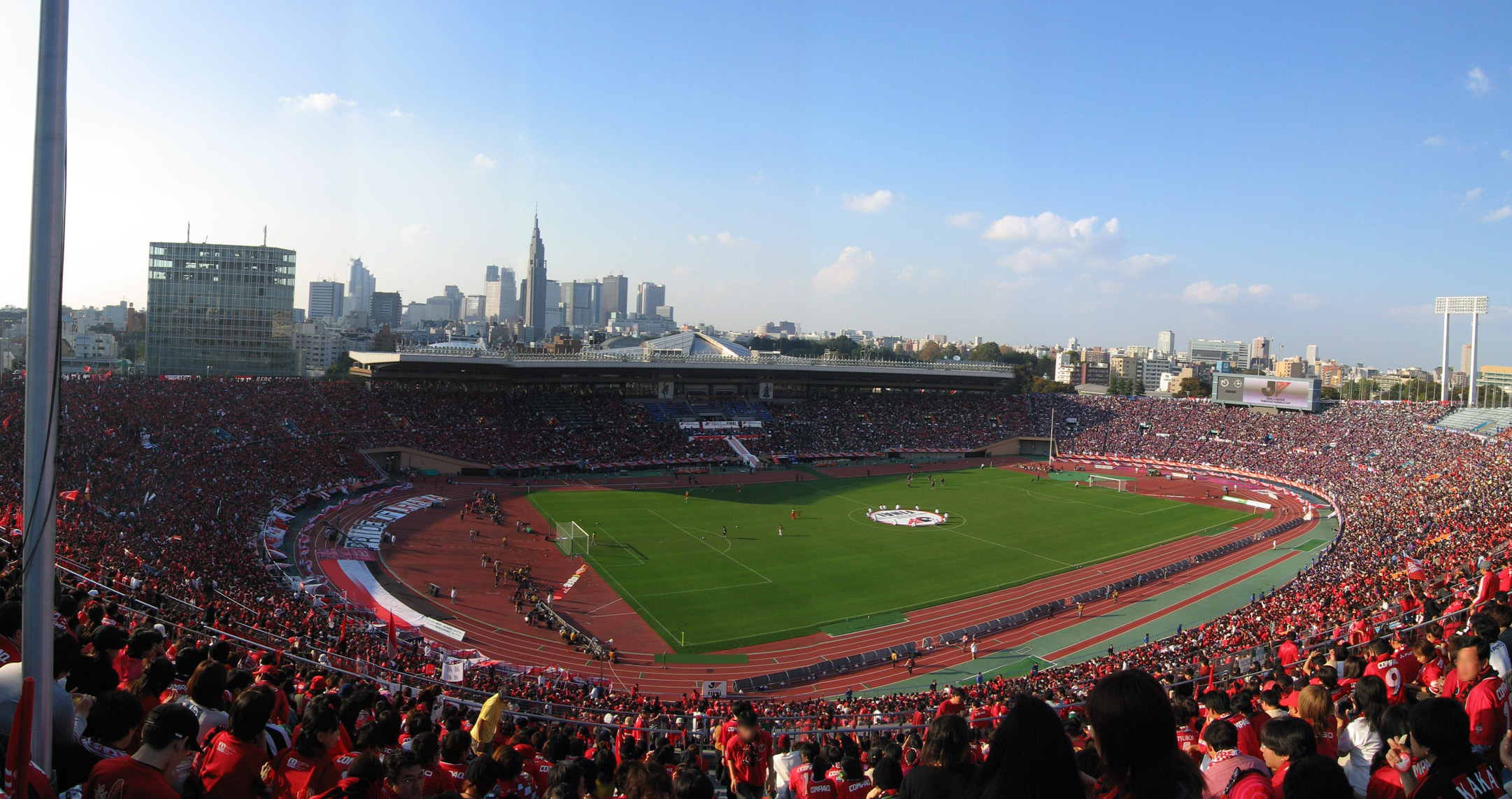
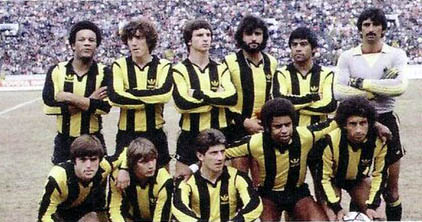
(Left): National Stadium in Tokyo hosted the final; (right): Peñarol, champions

== Match details ==
12 December 1982

Aston Villa (England)	0–2	(Uruguay) Peñarol
	Report	Jair 27'; Silva 68'

National Stadium, Tokyo
Attendance: 63,000
Referee: Luis Paulino Siles (Costa Rica)

Aston Villa	Peñarol

GK	1	(England) Jimmy Rimmer
DF	2	(England) Mark Jones
DF	5	(Scotland) Ken McNaught
DF	4	(Scotland) Allan Evans
DF	3	(England) Gary Williams
MF	6	(England) Dennis Mortimer (c)
MF	7	(Scotland) Des Bremner
MF	10	(England) Gordon Cowans
FW	9	(England) Peter Withe
FW	8	(England) Gary Shaw
FW	11	(England) Tony Morley
Manager:
(England) Tony Barton

GK	1	(Uruguay) Gustavo Fernández
DF	4	(Uruguay) Víctor Diogo
DF	2	(Uruguay) Walter Olivera (c)
DF	3	(Uruguay) Nelson Gutiérrez
DF	6	(Uruguay) Juan Morales
MF	8	(Uruguay) Mario Saralegui
MF	5	(Uruguay) Miguel Bossio
MF	10	(Brazil) Jair
FW	7	(Uruguay) Venancio Ramos
FW	9	(Uruguay) Fernando Morena
FW	11	(Uruguay) Walkir Silva
Manager:
(Uruguay) Hugo Bagnulo

== See also ==
- 1982–83 Aston Villa F.C. season
