= 1983–84 Aston Villa F.C. season =

English football club season

Aston Villa
1983–84 season
- Chairman: Doug Ellis
- Manager: Tony Barton
- Stadium: Villa Park
- First Division: 10th
- FA Cup: Third round
- League Cup: Semi-finals
- UEFA Cup: Second round
- Top goalscorer: League: Peter Withe (16 goals); All: Peter With (20 goals)

Second City Derby
- 40--30--25

The 1983–84 English football season was Aston Villa's 5th season in Europe and 85th season in the Football League. Villa competed in the Football League First Division.

Tony Barton's success in European competitions was not matched by Villa's league form and, when they finished tenth, he was dismissed in May 1984. Graham Turner left Shrewsbury after six seasons to take charge of Aston Villa that summer.

There were debut appearances for Paul Birch (173), Tony Dorigo (111), Steve McMahon (75), Paul Rideout (54), Mervyn Day (30), Dean Glover (28), Paul Kerr (24), and Steve Foster (15). The pitch has been repaired following a Duran Duran concert in the summer at Villa Park.

== First Division ==
Pos	Team	Pld	W	D	L	GF	GA	GD	Pts	Qualification or relegation
8	Tottenham Hotspur	42	17	10	15	64	65	−1	61	Qualification for the UEFA Cup first round (Note: Tottenham Hotspur qualified for the UEFA Cup as the 1983–84 UEFA Cup winners.)
9	West Ham United	42	17	9	16	60	55	+5	60	
10	Aston Villa	42	17	9	16	59	61	−2	60	
11	Watford	42	16	9	17	68	77	−9	57	
12	Ipswich Town	42	15	8	19	55	57	−2	53	

Source: World Football
Rules for classification: 1) Points; 2) Goal difference; 3) Goals scored

=== Matches ===
27 August 1983	Aston Villa	4–3	West Bromwich Albion	Villa Park
	Allan Evans 17', Mark Walters 36', Gary Shaw 41', Brendan Ormsby 66'	Report
Note: The Football League season commences. A seven-goal thriller at Villa Park sees Villa beat local rivals West Bromwich Albion 4–3. Steve McMahon becomes the 621st Villa player.

29 August 1983	Aston Villa	1–0	Sunderland	Villa Park
	Mark Walters 73'	Report
Note: Notts County, West Ham United, Villa and Arsenal all win their first two matches of the First Division season to lead the table at the end of August.

3 September 1983	Queens Park Rangers	2–1	Aston Villa	Loftus Road
		Report	Peter Withe 90'

7 September 1983	Nottingham Forest	2–2	Aston Villa	City Ground
		Report	Peter Withe 17', Gary Shaw 69'

10 September 1983	Aston Villa	1–0	Norwich City	Villa Park
	Dennis Mortimer 12'	Report

17 September 1983	Liverpool	2–1	Aston Villa	Anfield
		Report	Colin Gibson 84'

24 September 1983	Aston Villa	1–0	Southampton	Villa Park
	Peter Withe 25'	Report
Note: Southampton's title challenge is hit with a 1–0 defeat away to Aston Villa, who go sixth in the table.

1 October 1983	Luton Town	1–0	Aston Villa	Kenilworth Road
		Report

15 October 1983	Aston Villa	1–0	Birmingham City	Villa Park
	Peter Withe 29'	Report
Note: In the first Second City derby of the season Villa beat Blues 1-0 at home in front of a crowd of 39,318.

23 October 1983	Wolves	1–1	Aston Villa	Molineux Stadium
		Report	Peter Withe 32'
Note: The only league action of the day sees Villa draw 1–1 at home to local rivals Wolves.

29 October 1983	Aston Villa	2–6	Arsenal	Villa Park
	Tony Morley 37', Allan Evans 65' (pen)	Report
Note: Tony Woodcock scores five goals in Arsenal's 6–2 away win over Aston Villa

5 November 1983	Manchester United	1–2	Aston Villa	Old Trafford
		Report	Peter Withe 34', 62'
Note: Peter Withe scores twice as Aston Villa inflict a 2–1 defeat on Manchester United at Old Trafford, meaning that Liverpool can return to the top of the table if they win their game tomorrow.

12 November 1983	Aston Villa	1–1	Stoke City	Villa Park
	Peter Withe 54'	Report

19 November 1983	Aston Villa	3–1	Leicester City	Villa Park
	Peter Withe 21', Paul Rideout 34', Steve McMahon 70'	Report

26 November 1983	Notts County	5–2	Aston Villa	Meadow Lane
		Report	Dennis Mortimer 53', Allan Evans 90' (pen)
Note: Notts County boost their bid to keep clear of the relegation zone with a 5–2 win over Aston Villa.

3 December 1983	Aston Villa	1–0	West Ham United	Villa Park
	Paul Rideout 78'	Report
Note: West Ham United are beaten 1–0 by Aston Villa at Villa Park.

10 December 1983	Everton	1–1	Aston Villa	Goodison Park
		Report	Paul Rideout 60'

17 December 1983	Aston Villa	4–0	Ipswich Town	Villa Park
	Own goal 3', Paul Rideout 56', Steve McMahon 68', Allan Evans 76' (pen)	Report
Note: Liverpool return to the top of the First Division with a 5–0 home win over Notts County. Aston Villa keep up the pressure on the leading pack with a 4–0 home win over Ipswich Town. Caretaker manager Don Howe begins his spell in charge of Arsenal with a 3–1 home win over Watford. Coventry City miss the chance to close the gap on the leaders with a goalless draw at Norwich. QPR go fourth with a 2–0 home win over Everton.

26 December 1983	Watford	3–2	Aston Villa	Vicarage Road
		Report	Alan Curbishley 70', Mark Walters 79'

27 December 1983	Aston Villa	0–0	Tottenham Hotspur	Villa Park
		Report

31 December 1983	Aston Villa	2–1	Queens Park Rangers	Villa Park
	Allan Evans 69' (pen), Steve McMahon 80'	Report

2 January 1984	Southampton	2–2	Aston Villa	The Dell
		Report	Steve McMahon, Gary Shaw

14 January 1984	West Bromwich Albion	3–1	Aston Villa	The Hawthorns
		Report	Gary Shaw 46'

20 January 1984	Aston Villa	1–3	Liverpool	Villa Park
	Dennis Mortimer 16'	Report
Note: Ian Rush scores a hat-trick in Liverpool's 3–1 away win over Aston Villa in the First Division, increasing their lead at the top to five points, although their nearest challengers Manchester United can cut the gap to two points if they win at the weekend.

4 February 1984	Aston Villa	0–0	Luton Town	Villa Park
		Report

11 February 1984	Norwich City	3–1	Aston Villa	Carrow Road
		Report	Gary Shaw 90'

18 February 1984	Arsenal	1–1	Aston Villa	Highbury
		Report	Allan Evans (pen)
Note: In the First Division, Arsenal draw 1–1 with Aston Villa at Highbury.

25 February 1984	Aston Villa	4–0	Wolves	Villa Park
	Peter Withe (2), Paul Birch, Mark Walters	Report
Note: Wolves are now 13 points adrift of safety after losing 4–0 to local rivals Aston Villa in the First Division at Villa Park.

3 March 1984	Aston Villa	0–3	Manchester United	Villa Park
		Report
Note: The Merseyside derby at Goodison Park ends in a 1–1 draw, allowing Manchester United to cut Liverpool's lead to two points by beating Aston Villa 3–0 at Villa Park.

10 March 1984	Stoke City	1–0	Aston Villa	Victoria Ground
		Report

13 March 1984	Coventry City	3–3	Aston Villa	Highfield Road
		Report	Allan Evans (pen), Peter Withe, Paul Rideout
Note: Midweek action in the First Division includes a six-goal thriller at Highfield Road, where local rivals Coventry City and Aston Villa draw 3–3.

17 March 1984	Aston Villa	1–0	Nottingham Forest	Villa Park
	Steve McMahon 82'	Report
Note: Nottingham Forest's title challenge is fading as they go down 1–0 at Aston Villa, as is West Ham's following a 4–1 defeat to Leicester City at Filbert Street.

24 March 1984	Sunderland	0–1	Aston Villa	Roker Park
		Report	Mark Walters 43'

31 March 1984	Birmingham City	2–1	Aston Villa	St Andrew's
		Report	Peter Withe 29'

7 April 1984	Aston Villa	2–0	Coventry City	Villa Park
	Brendan Ormsby 34', Paul Birch 46'	Report

14 April 1984	Leicester City	2–0	Aston Villa	Filbert Street
		Report

18 April 1984	Tottenham Hotspur	2–1	Aston Villa	White Hart Lane
		Report	Mark Walters 33'
Note: Tottenham Hotspur remain in the hunt for another top-five finish by beating Aston Villa 2–1.

21 April 1984	Aston Villa	2–1	Watford	Villa Park
	Dennis Mortimer 2', Steve Foster 59'	Report

28 April 1984	Aston Villa	3–1	Notts County	Villa Park
	Mark Walters (2), Peter Withe	Report

5 May 1984	West Ham United	0–1	Aston Villa	Boleyn Ground
		Report	Dennis Mortimer 19'

7 May 1984	Aston Villa	0–2	Everton	Villa Park
		Report

12 May 1984	Ipswich Town	2–1	Aston Villa	Portman Road
		Report	Peter Withe 29'
Note: The 18-year-old Tony Dorigo made his debut.

Source: avfchistory.co.uk

== FA Cup ==
7 January 1984 Third round	Aston Villa	1–1	Norwich City	Villa Park
	John Deehan 26'	Report	Peter Withe 34'
Note: Teams from the Football League First and Second Divisions entered in the Third round. The third round matches were played over the weekend 6–8 January 1984. Replays took place on 10–11 January. Holders Manchester United were eliminated by third-tier AFC Bournemouth. The 18-year-old Tony Dorigo made his debut. Former-Villa player John Deehan opened the scoring for Norwich. Peter Withe equalised for Villa.

11 January 1984 Third round replay	Norwich City	3–0	Aston Villa	Carrow Road
		Report

== League Cup ==
=== Second round ===
First leg

Home team	Score	Away team	Date
Portsmouth	2–2	Aston Villa	4 October 1983

Second leg

Home team	Score	Away team	Date	Agg
Aston Villa	3-2	Portsmouth	26 October 1983	5–4

=== Third round ===
Home team	Score	Away team	Date
Aston Villa	3–0	Manchester City	9 November 1983

=== Fourth round ===
Ties

Home team	Score	Away team	Date
West Bromwich Albion	1–2	Aston Villa	30 November 1983

30 Nov 1983: In the League Cup, there is a local derby at The Hawthorns, where Aston Villa beat West Bromwich Albion 2–1.

=== Semi-final ===
15 February 1984 1st leg	Everton	2–0	Aston Villa	Walton, Liverpool
	Sheedy 28'; Richardson 82'	Report		Stadium: Goodison Park; Attendance: 40,006
Note: Everton beat Aston Villa 2–0 in the League Cup semi-final first leg.

22 February 1984 2nd leg	Aston Villa	1–0	Everton	Aston, Birmingham
	P. Rideout 62'	Report		Stadium: Villa Park; Attendance: 42,426
Note: 22 Feb 1984: Despite losing 1–0 to Aston Villa in the semi-final second leg, Everton are through to the League Cup final, securing them their first cup final for seven years.

== UEFA Cup ==
=== First round ===
14 September 1983 1st leg	Vitória S.C. (Portugal)	1–0	(England) Aston Villa	Estádio D. Afonso Henriques, Guimarães
18:00	Gregório Freixo 82' (pen.)	Report		Attendance: 28,750; Referee: Joël Quiniou (France)

28 September 1983 2nd leg	Aston Villa (England)	5–0 (5–1 agg.)	(Portugal) Vitória S.C.	Villa Park, Birmingham
20:45	Withe 2', 48', 89'; Ormsby 56'; Gibson 74'	Report		Attendance: 23,732; Referee: Werner Föckler (West Germany)
Note: 28 Sep 1983: All four English entrants in the UEFA Cup – Watford, Nottingham Forest, Tottenham Hotspur and Aston Villa – progress to the second round.

=== Second round ===
19 October 1983 1st leg	Spartak Moscow (Soviet Union)	2–2	(England) Aston Villa	Central Dynamo Stadium, Moscow
17:00	Gavrilov 52', 89' (pen.)	Report	Gibson 47'; Walters 68'	Attendance: 50,400; Referee: Roger Schoeters (Belgium)

2 November 1983 2nd leg	Aston Villa (England)	1–2 (3–4 agg.)	(Soviet Union) Spartak Moscow	Villa Park, Birmingham
20:30	Withe 2'	Report	Cherenkov 46', 89'	Attendance: 29,511; Referee: Egbert Mulder (Netherlands)
Note: 2 Nov 1983: Tottenham eliminate Dutch side Feyenoord 6–2 on aggregate in the second round of the UEFA Cup. Watford eliminate Levski Sofia from the competition and Nottingham Forest oust PSV Eindhoven, but Aston Villa are edged out 4–3 on aggregate by Spartak Moscow.
