= 1977–78 Aston Villa F.C. season =

English football club season

Aston Villa
1977–78 season
- Chairman: Sir William Dugdale, Bt
- Manager: Ron Saunders
- Stadium: Villa Park
- First Division: 8th
- FA Cup: Third round
- League Cup: Fourth round

Second City Derby
- 33--28--24

The 1977–78 English football season was Aston Villa's 2nd season in Europe and 79th season in the Football League, their third consecutive season in the top division.

Villa reached the quarter-final of the UEFA Cup where they went out 4–3 on aggregate against Barcelona. In the domestic league, however, they struggled, and Saunders started rebuilding the team.

There were debut appearances for Jimmy Rimmer (229), Ken McNaught, John Gregory, Tommy Craig, David Evans and Allan Evans.

Villa lost both games in the Second City derby.

== UEFA Cup ==
Aston Villa qualifiled following their 4th place finish in the previous season.

14 September 1977 First round 1st	Aston Villa	4–0	Fenerbahçe	Villa Park
	Andy Gray 12', John Deehan 34', 66'	Report

28 September 1977 First round 2nd	Fenerbahçe	0–2	Aston Villa	Turkey
		Report	John Deehan 6', Brian Little 52'	Stadium: Şükrü Saracoğlu Stadium
Note: Agg. 6–0

19 October 1977 Second round 1st	Aston Villa	2–0	Górnik Zabrze	Villa Park
	Ken McNaught 11', 54'	Report

2 November 1977 Second round 2nd	Górnik Zabrze	1–1	Aston Villa	Poland
	Andy Gray 52'	Report		Stadium: Górnik Zabrze Stadium; Attendance: 15,000
Note: Agg. 3–1

23 November 1977 Third round 1st	Aston Villa	2–0	Athletic Bilbao	Villa Park
	OG: José Ángel Iribar 33', John Deehan 78'	Report

7 December 1977 Second round 2nd	Athletic Bilbao	1–1	Aston Villa	San Mamés Stadium
	Andy Gray 52'	Report		Attendance: 39,000
Note: Agg. 3–1

1 March 1978 Quarter-finals 1st	Aston Villa	2–2	Barcelona	Villa Park
	Ken McNaught 87', John Deehan 89'	Report		Attendance: 49,619
Note: 19-year-old Dave Evans made his debut. The 21-year-old Allan Evans also made his Villa debut coming on for D. Evans in the 60th minute. A. Evan's got the assist to John Deehan's 89th minute equaliser.

15 March 1978 Quarter-finals 2nd	Barcelona	2–1	Aston Villa	Camp Nou
	Brian Little 57'	Report		Attendance: 90,000
Note: Agg. 3–4

== League table ==
Pos	Team	Pld	W	D	L	GF	GA	GD	Pts	Qualification or relegation
6	West Bromwich Albion	42	18	14	10	62	53	+9	50	Qualification for the UEFA Cup first round
7	Coventry City	42	18	12	12	75	62	+13	48	
8	Aston Villa	42	18	10	14	57	42	+15	46	
9	Leeds United	42	18	10	14	63	53	+10	46	
10	Manchester United	42	16	10	16	67	63	+4	42	

Source: World Football
Rules for classification: 1) Points; 2) Goal difference; 3) Goals scored

=== Matches ===
Win Draw Loss Fixtures

20 August 1977 1	QPR	1–2	Aston Villa	Loftus Road
		Report	Deehan 47'; Carrodus 55'

24 August 1977 2	Aston Villa	1–4	Manchester City	Villa Park
	Deehan 4'	Report

27 August 1977 3	Aston Villa	1–2	Everton	Villa Park
	Gray 22'	Report

3 September 1977 4	Bristol City	1–1	Aston Villa	Ashton Gate
		Report	Little 20'

10 September 1977 5	Aston Villa	1–0	Arsenal	Villa Park
	Cropley 90'	Report

17 September 1977 6	Forest	2–0	Aston Villa	City Ground
		Report

23 September 1977 7	Aston Villa	2–0	Wolves	Villa Park
	Own Goal 75'; Deehan 90'	Report

1 October 1977 8	Aston Villa	0–1	Birmingham	Villa Park
		Report

5 October 1977 9	Leeds	1–1	Aston Villa	Elland Road
		Report	Gray 32'

8 October 1977 10	Leicester	0–2	Aston Villa	Filbert Street
		Report	Cowans 49'; Gray 61'

15 October 1977 11	Aston Villa	3–0	Norwich	Villa Park
	Gray 18'; Cowans 62'; Little 77'	Report

22 October 1977 12	West Ham	2–2	Aston Villa	Boleyn Ground
		Report	McNaught 25'; Gray 77'

29 October 1977 13	Aston Villa	2–1	United	Villa Park
	Gray 31'; Cropley 40'	Report

5 November 1977 14	Liverpool	1–2	Aston Villa	Anfield
		Report	Gray 41'; Gray 72'

12 November 1977 15	Aston Villa	0–1	Boro	Villa Park
		Report

19 November 1977 16	Chelsea	0–0	Aston Villa	Stamford Bridge
		Report

3 December 1977 17	Ipswich	2–0	Aston Villa	Portman Road
		Report

10 December 1977 18	Aston Villa	3–0	Albion	Villa Park
	Cowans 39'; Gray 44'; Gidman 54'	Report

17 December 1977 19	Boro	1–0	Aston Villa	Ayresome Park
		Report

26 December 1977 20	Aston Villa	1–1	Coventry	Villa Park
	Deehan 73'	Report

27 December 1977 21	Derby	0–3	Aston Villa	Baseball Ground
		Report	Little 8'; Gray 37'; Deehan 89'

31 December 1977 22	Manchester City	2–0	Aston Villa	Maine Road
		Report

2 January 1978 23	Aston Villa	1–1	QPR	Villa Park
	Little 22'	Report

14 January 1978 24	Everton	1–0	Aston Villa	Goodison Park
		Report

28 January 1978 25	Aston Villa	1–0	Bristol City	Villa Park
	Deehan 80'	Report

4 February 1978 26	Arsenal	0–1	Aston Villa	Highbury
		Report	Own Goal 22'

25 February 1978 27	Birmingham	1–0	Aston Villa	St Andrew's
		Report

4 March 1978 28	Aston Villa	0–0	Leicester	Villa Park
		Report

11 March 1978 29	Norwich	2–1	Aston Villa	Carrow Road
		Report	Gregory 87'

18 March 1978 30	Aston Villa	4–1	West Ham	Villa Park
	Gregory 18'; Deehan 33'; Mortimer 75'; Gregory 79'	Report

21 March 1978 31	Coventry	2–3	Aston Villa	Highfield Road
		Report	Little 34'; McNaught 40'; Gray 69'

25 March 1978 32	Aston Villa	0–0	Derby	Villa Park
		Report

29 March 1978 33	United	1–1	Aston Villa	Old Trafford
		Report	Deehan 71'

1 April 1978 34	Aston Villa	0–3	Liverpool	Villa Park
		Report

5 April 1978 35	Aston Villa	0–1	Forest	Villa Park
		Report

8 April 1978 36	Newcastle	1–1	Aston Villa	St James' Park
		Report	Evans 67'

15 April 1978 37	Aston Villa	2–0	Chelsea	Villa Park
	Cowans 55'; Own Goal 87'	Report

17 April 1978 38	Aston Villa	2–0	Newcastle	Villa Park
	Cowans 24'; Gray 69'	Report
Note: Newcastle United lose and are relegated to the Second Division.

22 April 1978 39	Albion	0–3	Aston Villa	The Hawthorns
		Report	Deehan 25'; Cowans 33'; Mortimer 40'

26 April 1978 40	Aston Villa	3–1	Leeds	Villa Park
	Deehan 2'; Little 72'; Mortimer 74'	Report

29 April 1978 41	Aston Villa	6–1	Ipswich	Villa Park
	Deehan 14'; Gray 17'; Little 23'; Deehan 45'; Carrodus 53'; Cowans 68'	Report

2 May 1978 42	Wolves	3–1	Aston Villa	Molineux Stadium
		Report	Carrodus 28'
Note: Wolves beat Villa 3–1 to stay in the First Division at West Ham United's expense.

Source: avfchistory.co.uk

== FA Cup ==
Teams from the Football League First and Second Divisions entered in the Third round. The third round of games in the FA Cup were played on 6–7 January 1978. Replays were mainly played over 9–11 January but some occurred on 16 January instead.

Tie no	Home team	Score	Away team	Date
12	Everton	4–1	Aston Villa	7 January 1978

== League Cup ==
=== Second round ===
Home team	Score	Away team	Date
Exeter City	1–3	Aston Villa	31 August 1977

=== Last 32 ===
Home team	Score	Away team	Date
Aston Villa	1–0	Queens Park Rangers	26 October 1977

=== Last 16 ===
Home team	Score	Away team	Date
Nottingham Forest	4–2	Aston Villa	29 November 1977

== Squad ==
All Aston Villa players: 1978 Note: Flags indicate national team as defined under FIFA eligibility rules; some limited exceptions apply. Players may hold more than one non-FIFA nationality.

Pos.	Nation	Player
GK	ENG	Jimmy Rimmer
DF	ENG	John Gidman
DF	SCO	Gordon Smith
DF	WAL	Leighton Phillips
DF	SCO	Ken McNaught
MF	ENG	Dennis Mortimer
FW	ENG	John Deehan
FW	ENG	Brian Little
FW	SCO	Andy Gray

Pos.	Nation	Player
MF	ENG	Gordon Cowans
MF	ENG	Frank Carrodus
DF	ENG	John Gregory
MF	SCO	Alex Cropley
DF	SCO	Allan Evans
MF	SCO	Tommy Craig
DF	ENG	John Robson
DF	ENG	Mike Buttress
DF	ENG	Ivor Linton
