= Bill Poynton =

English footballer

Personal information
- Full name: William Poynton
- Date of birth: 30 June 1944 (age 82)
- Place of birth: Shiremoor, England
- Position: Defender

Senior career*
Years	Team	Apps	(Gls)
1961–1962	Burnley	0	(0)
1964–1966	Mansfield Town	20	(0)
1966	Lockheed Leamington		
1966	Oldham Athletic	0	(0)
1966	Lincoln City	1	(0)
1967	Ashington		
Total		21	(0)
- * Club domestic league appearances and goals

William Poynton (born 30 June 1943) is an English former professional footballer who played in the Football League for Lincoln City and Mansfield Town.

In September 1968 Tony Barton replaced Poynton as Portsmouth's chief scout.
