= 1982 European Cup final =

- Match programme cover
- Event: 1981–82 European Cup
Bayern Munich	Aston Villa
(West Germany)	(England)
0	1
- Date: 26 May 1982
- Venue: De Kuip, Rotterdam
- Man of the Match: Peter Withe (Aston Villa)
- Referee: Georges Konrath (France)
- Attendance: 46,000

The 1982 European Cup final was played on 26 May 1982 at the end of the 1981–82 European Cup season. Football League First Division winners Aston Villa defeated Bundesliga winners Bayern Munich 1–0 at De Kuip in Rotterdam, Netherlands, to win their first European Cup; this continued the streak of English teams winning the competition in six straight seasons. This was the only time Villa won a European final until 44 years later.

== Route to the final ==
(West Germany) Bayern Munich				Round	(England) Aston Villa			
Opponent	Agg.	1st leg	2nd leg		Opponent	Agg.	1st leg	2nd leg
(Sweden) Östers IF	6–0	1–0 (A)	5–0 (H)	First round	(Iceland) Valur	7–0	5–0 (H)	2–0 (A)
(Portugal) Benfica	4–1	0–0 (A)	4–1 (H)	Second round	(East Germany) Dynamo Berlin	2–2 (a)	2–1 (A)	0–1 (H)
(Romania) Universitatea Craiova	3–1	2–0 (A)	1–1 (H)	Quarter-finals	(Soviet Union) Dynamo Kyiv	2–0	0–0 (A)	2–0 (H)
(Bulgaria) CSKA Sofia	7–4	3–4 (A)	4–0 (H)	Semi-finals	(Belgium) Anderlecht	1–0	1–0 (H)	0–0 (A)

== Match ==
=== Summary ===
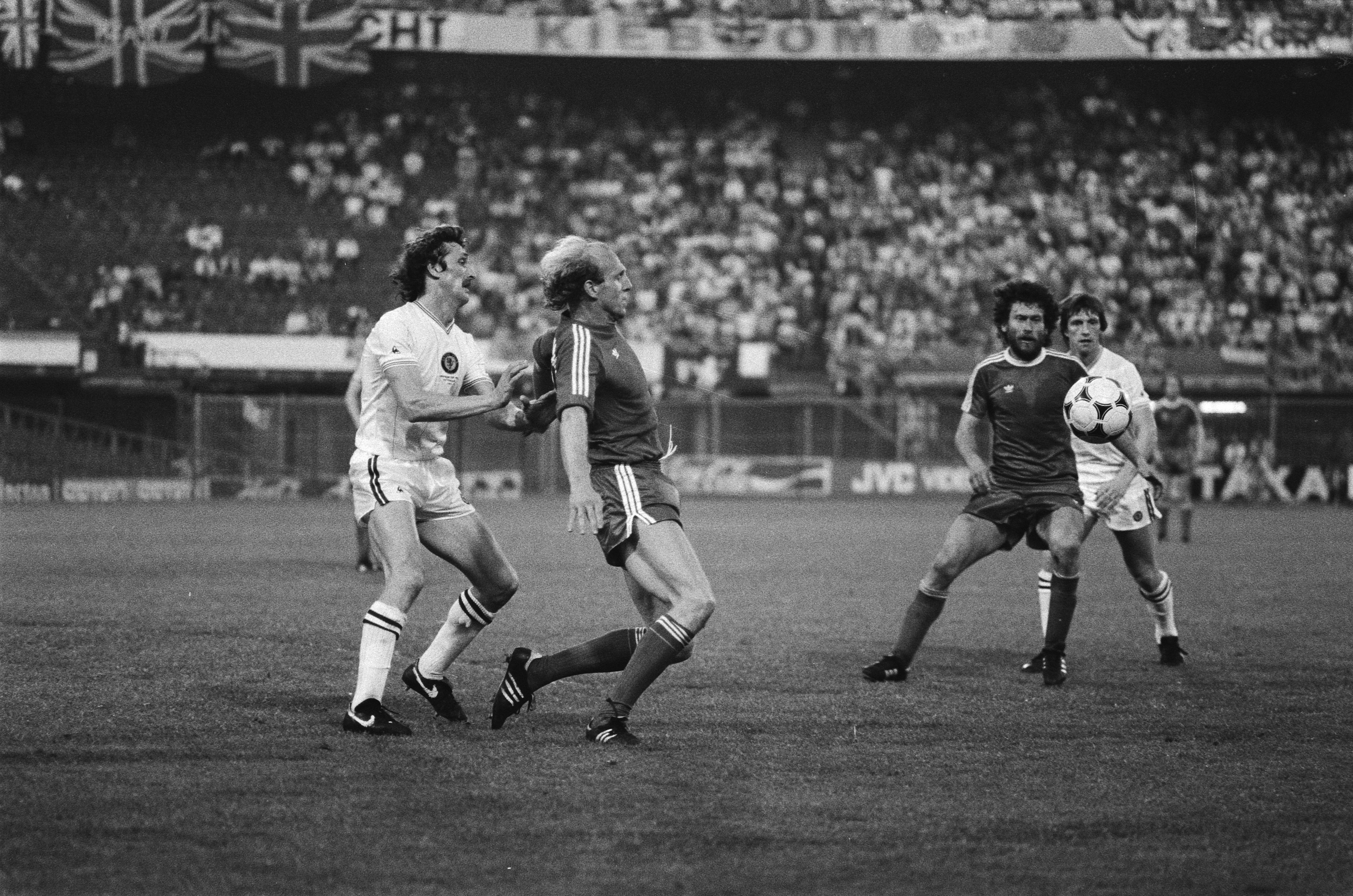
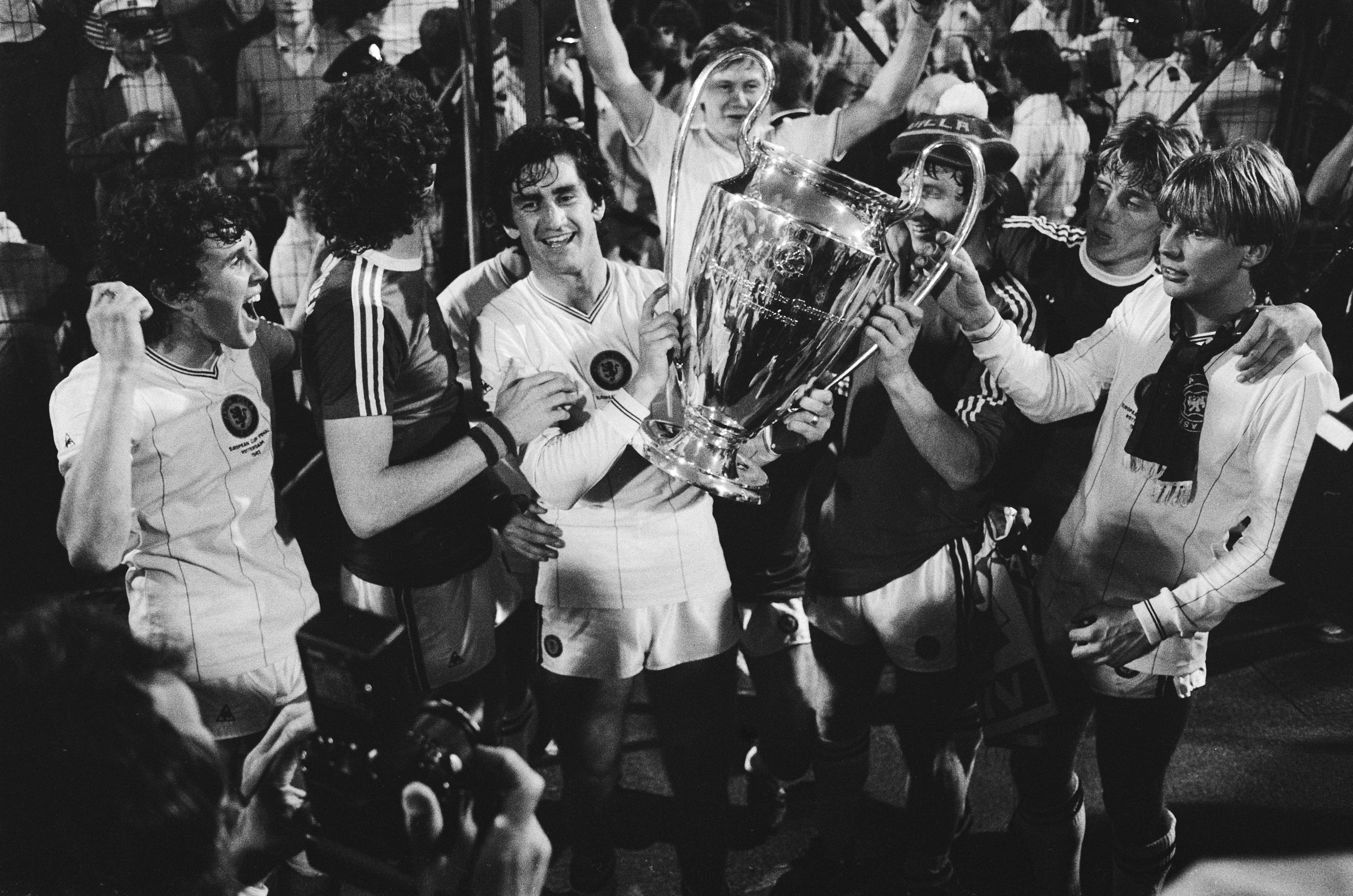
Two moments of the match, (left): Des Bremner, Dieter Hoeneß, Paul Breitner, and Kenny Swain in action; (right): Players of Aston Villa celebrating their victory

After 10 minutes, Aston Villa goalkeeper Jimmy Rimmer suffered a repeat of a recurring shoulder injury. His replacement, Nigel Spink, subsequently made his second first team appearance for the club. His performance in helping prevent Bayern from scoring throughout the match was highly praised, and is seen by many as the making of a player who would be Villa's first choice goalkeeper for the following 10 seasons.

Bayern did find the net with three minutes of play remaining, but the goal was disallowed for offside. Villa also got the ball in the net for a second time a few seconds before the end of the match but this goal was also disallowed.

Brian Moore's commentary on the winning goal is displayed on a giant banner across the Doug Ellis Stand of Villa Park:

Shaw, Williams prepared to venture down the left. There's a good ball in for Tony Morley. Oh, it must be and it is! It's Peter Withe.

As defending European champions, Villa were invited into the European Cup, European Super Cup and the Intercontinental Cup for the following season. Their defence of the European Cup ended in a quarter-final defeat to Juventus. They beat Barcelona 3–1 on aggregate to win the Super Cup, but lost 2–0 to Uruguayan club Peñarol for the Intercontinental Cup in Tokyo, Japan.

After the game, a number of players swapped shirts; Peter Withe and Nigel Spink later received their shirts back. As of 2024, captain Dennis Mortimer was still looking for his shirt.

=== Details ===
26 May 1982
20:15 CEST

Bayern Munich (West Germany)	0–1	(England) Aston Villa
	Report	Withe 67'

De Kuip, Rotterdam
Attendance: 46,000
Referee: Georges Konrath (France)

Bayern Munich	Aston Villa

GK	1	(West Germany) Manfred Müller
RB	2	(West Germany) Wolfgang Dremmler
CB	4	(West Germany) Hans Weiner
CB	5	(West Germany) Klaus Augenthaler
LB	8	(West Germany) Paul Breitner (c)
RM	10	(West Germany) Reinhold Mathy	(substituted off) 51'
CM	6	(West Germany) Wolfgang Kraus	(substituted off) 78'
CM	7	(West Germany) Bernd Dürnberger
LM	3	(West Germany) Udo Horsmann
CF	9	(West Germany) Dieter Hoeneß
CF	11	(West Germany) Karl-Heinz Rummenigge
Substitutes:
GK	12	(West Germany) Walter Junghans
MF	13	(West Germany) Kurt Niedermayer	(substituted on) 78'
DF	14	(West Germany) Hans Pflügler
MF	15	(Iceland) Ásgeir Sigurvinsson
MF	16	(West Germany) Günter Güttler	(substituted on) 51'
Manager:
(Hungary) Pál Csernai

GK	1	(England) Jimmy Rimmer		(substituted off) 9'
RB	2	(England) Kenny Swain
CB	5	(Scotland) Ken McNaught
CB	4	(Scotland) Allan Evans
LB	3	(England) Gary Williams	(yellow card) 38'
CM	6	(England) Dennis Mortimer (c)
CM	10	(England) Gordon Cowans
CM	7	(Scotland) Des Bremner
RF	8	(England) Gary Shaw
CF	9	(England) Peter Withe
LF	11	(England) Tony Morley
Substitutes:
MF	12	(England) Pat Heard
MF	13	(Scotland) Andy Blair
FW	14	(England) David Geddis
DF	15	(England) Colin Gibson
GK	16	(England) Nigel Spink		(substituted on) 9'
Manager:
(England) Tony Barton

Match officials

- Linesman (red flag): Joel Quiniou (France)
- Linesman (yellow flag): Rene Lopez (France)

== See also ==
- 1981–82 FC Bayern Munich season
- 1981–82 Aston Villa F.C. season
- 1982 European Cup Winners' Cup final
- 1982 European Super Cup
- 1982 UEFA Cup final
- FC Bayern Munich in international football
- Aston Villa F.C. in European football
