= Andy Blair (footballer) =

Scottish footballer

Personal information
- Full name: Andrew Blair
- Date of birth: 18 December 1959 (age 66)
- Place of birth: Kirkcaldy, Scotland
- Height: 5 ft 8 in (1.73 m)
- Position: Midfielder

Senior career*
Years	Team	Apps	(Gls)
1978–1981	Coventry City	93	(6)
1981–1984	Aston Villa	33	(0)
1983	→ Wolverhampton Wanderers (loan)	10	(0)
1984–1986	Sheffield Wednesday	58	(3)
1986–1988	Aston Villa	21	(1)
1987–1988	→ Barnsley (loan)	6	(0)
1988–1989	Northampton Town	3	(0)
Total		224	(10)

International career
1980–1982	Scotland U21	5	(2)
- * Club domestic league appearances and goals

Andrew Blair (born 18 December 1959) is a British former footballer who was born in Scotland but grew up in England and spent his career in English football. He played in the Aston Villa team that beat Barcelona 3–0 at Villa Park to win the 1982 European Super Cup.

== Football career ==
Born in Kirkcaldy, Fife, Blair grew up in Bedworth, Warwickshire, and was educated at Nicholas Chamberlaine School in the town. He made his league debut for Coventry City, whom he had joined as an apprentice, on 28 October 1978 in a 2–1 win against Birmingham City.

Blair also played top-flight football at Aston Villa (in two separate spells) where he won the Charity Shield in 1981 (shared) and the European Cup in 1982 as an unused substitute. Blair also played for Sheffield Wednesday and on loan at Wolverhampton Wanderers.

In November 1984, while playing for Sheffield Wednesday against Luton Town, he achieved the unusual distinction of being the first player to ever score a hat-trick of penalties in the League Cup.

He also appeared for Barnsley and Northampton Town, before a knee injury ended his professional career in 1989, at the age of 30. He is working as a scout for Stoke City.

== Personal life ==
Blair's son Matty also played for Kidderminster Harriers.
