= 1982 European Super Cup =

Barcelona	Aston Villa
(Spain)	(England)
1	3
- on aggregate

First leg
Barcelona	Aston Villa
1	0
- Date: 19 January 1983
- Venue: Camp Nou, Barcelona
- Referee: Bruno Galler (Switzerland)
- Attendance: 40,000

Second leg
Aston Villa	Barcelona
3	0
- After extra time
- Date: 26 January 1983
- Venue: Villa Park, Birmingham
- Referee: Alexis Ponnet (Belgium)
- Attendance: 31,570

The 1982 European Super Cup was contested between the 1981–82 European Cup winners Aston Villa and the 1981–82 European Cup Winners' Cup winners Barcelona. The tie took place over two legs in January 1983. The first leg was won by Barcelona 1–0 at the Camp Nou stadium, but Aston Villa won 3–0 at Villa Park after extra time to take a 3–1 aggregate win.

== Details ==
=== First leg ===
19 January 1983
20:45 CET

Barcelona (Spain)	1–0	(England) Aston Villa
Marcos Alonso 52'	Report

Camp Nou, Barcelona
Attendance: 40,000
Referee: Bruno Galler (Switzerland)

Barcelona	Aston Villa

GK	1	(Spain) Urruti
DF	2	(Spain) Tente Sánchez (c)
DF	3	(Spain) Migueli
DF	4	(Spain) Julio Alberto
MF	5	(Spain) Periko Alonso	(substituted off) 76'
DF	6	(Spain) José Ramón Alexanko
FW	7	(Spain) Marcos Alonso
MF	8	(West Germany) Bernd Schuster
FW	9	(Spain) Quini	(substituted off) 70'
MF	10	(Spain) Víctor Muñoz
FW	11	(Spain) Lobo Carrasco
Substitutes:
MF	12	(Spain) Urbano Ortega	(substituted on) 76'
FW	13	(Spain) Pichi Alonso	(substituted on) 70'
Manager:
(West Germany) Udo Lattek

GK	1	(England) Nigel Spink
DF	2	(England) Mark Jones	(substituted off) 36'
DF	3	(England) Gary Williams
DF	4	(Scotland) Allan Evans
DF	5	(Scotland) Ken McNaught
MF	6	(England) Dennis Mortimer (c)
MF	7	(Scotland) Des Bremner
FW	8	(England) Gary Shaw
FW	9	(England) Peter Withe
MF	10	(England) Gordon Cowans
MF	11	(England) Tony Morley
Substitutes:
DF	12	(England) Colin Gibson	(substituted on) 36'
Manager:
(England) Tony Barton

=== Second leg ===
26 January 1983
19:30 GMT

Aston Villa (England)	3–0 (a.e.t.)	(Spain) Barcelona
Shaw 80'; Cowans 100'; McNaught 104'	Report

Villa Park, Birmingham
Attendance: 31,570
Referee: Alexis Ponnet (Belgium)

Aston Villa	Barcelona

GK	1	(England) Nigel Spink
DF	2	(England) Gary Williams
DF	3	(England) Colin Gibson		(yellow card) 40'
DF	4	(Scotland) Allan Evans		(yellow card) 77' (yellow-red card) 110'
DF	5	(Scotland) Ken McNaught (c)		(yellow card) 50'
MF	6	(Scotland) Andy Blair
MF	7	(Scotland) Des Bremner
FW	8	(England) Gary Shaw	(substituted off) 113'
FW	9	(England) Peter Withe
MF	10	(England) Gordon Cowans
MF	11	(England) Tony Morley	(substituted off) 72'
Substitutes:
MF	12	(England) Mark Walters	(substituted on) 72'
FW	14	(England) Paul Birch	(substituted on) 113'
Manager:
(England) Tony Barton

GK	1	(Spain) Urruti	(yellow card) 101'
DF	2	(Spain) Tente Sánchez (c)
DF	3	(Spain) Migueli
DF	4	(Spain) Julio Alberto	(yellow card) 9' (yellow-red card) 50'
MF	5	(Spain) Periko Alonso
DF	6	(Spain) José Ramón Alexanko	(yellow card) 53'
FW	7	(Spain) Marcos Alonso	(red card) 105'
MF	8	(West Germany) Bernd Schuster	(yellow card) 75'
FW	9	(Spain) Urbano Ortega	(yellow card) 38'
MF	10	(Spain) Víctor Muñoz
FW	11	(Spain) Lobo Carrasco		(substituted off) 29'
Substitutes:
FW	16	(Spain) Quini		(substituted on) 29'	(substituted off) 55'
DF	14	(Spain) Manolo	(yellow card) 105'		(substituted on) 55'
Manager:
(West Germany) Udo Lattek

== See also ==
- 1982 European Cup final
- 1982 European Cup Winners' Cup final
- 1982–83 European Cup
- 1982–83 European Cup Winners' Cup
- 1982–83 Aston Villa F.C. season
- 1982–83 FC Barcelona season
- FC Barcelona in international football
- Aston Villa F.C. in European football
