= Walkir Silva =

Uruguayan footballer

Personal information
- Full name: Walkir Silva Castellanos
- Date of birth: 6 December 1959 (age 66)
- Place of birth: Montevideo, Uruguay
- Position: Forward

Senior career*
Years	Team	Apps	(Gls)
1982–1986	Peñarol		
1987	Barcelona		
1988	Liverpool		
1989	Maccabi Tel Aviv		
- Liverpool
- Central Español
- El Tanque Sisley
- * Club domestic league appearances and goals

Walkir Silva Castellanos (born 6 December 1959) is a Uruguayan former footballer who played as a forward. He scored a goal against Aston Villa in the 1982 Intercontinental Cup for Peñarol to become the champion of the world.

== Personal life ==
Silva is the grandfather of Uruguayan footballer Agustín Dávila.

== Honours ==
Peñarol

- Uruguayan Primera División: 1982, 1985, 1986
- Copa Libertadores: 1982
- Intercontinental Cup: 1982

Barcelona

- Ecuadorian Serie A: 1987
