= Tony Morley =

English footballer (born 1955)

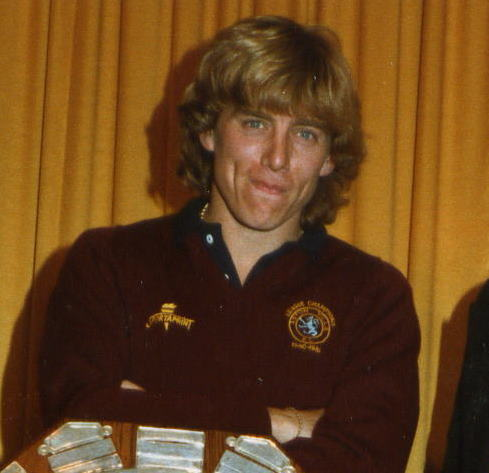
- Morley in 1983

Personal information
- Full name: William Anthony Morley
- Date of birth: 26 August 1954 (age 72)
- Place of birth: Ormskirk, England
- Height: 5 ft 8 in (1.73 m)
- Position: Winger

Youth career
- 1969–1972: Preston North End

Senior career*
Years	Team	Apps	(Gls)
1972–1976	Preston North End	84	(15)
1976–1979	Burnley	91	(5)
1979–1983	Aston Villa	137	(25)
1983–1985	West Bromwich Albion	33	(4)
1984	→ Birmingham City (loan)	4	(3)
1985–1986	Seiko	32	(21)
1986–1987	FC Den Haag	31	(13)
1987–1989	West Bromwich Albion	28	(7)
1988	→ Burnley (loan)	5	(0)
1989	Tampa Bay Rowdies	2	(0)
1990	Hamrun Spartans	1	(1)
Total		359	(95)

International career
1973	England Youth	7	(1)
1975	England U23	1	(0)
1980–1981	England B	3	(0)
1981–1982	England	6	(0)
- * Club domestic league appearances and goals

William Anthony Morley (born 26 August 1954) is an English former footballer who played as a winger. He played in the Football League for Preston North End, Burnley, Aston Villa, West Bromwich Albion and Birmingham City, as well as playing for other teams abroad. He also won six caps for England.

Morley is now a regular on the 'Villa Old Stars' circuit. He also provides co-commentary for radio broadcasts on Aston Villa's website.

== Club career ==
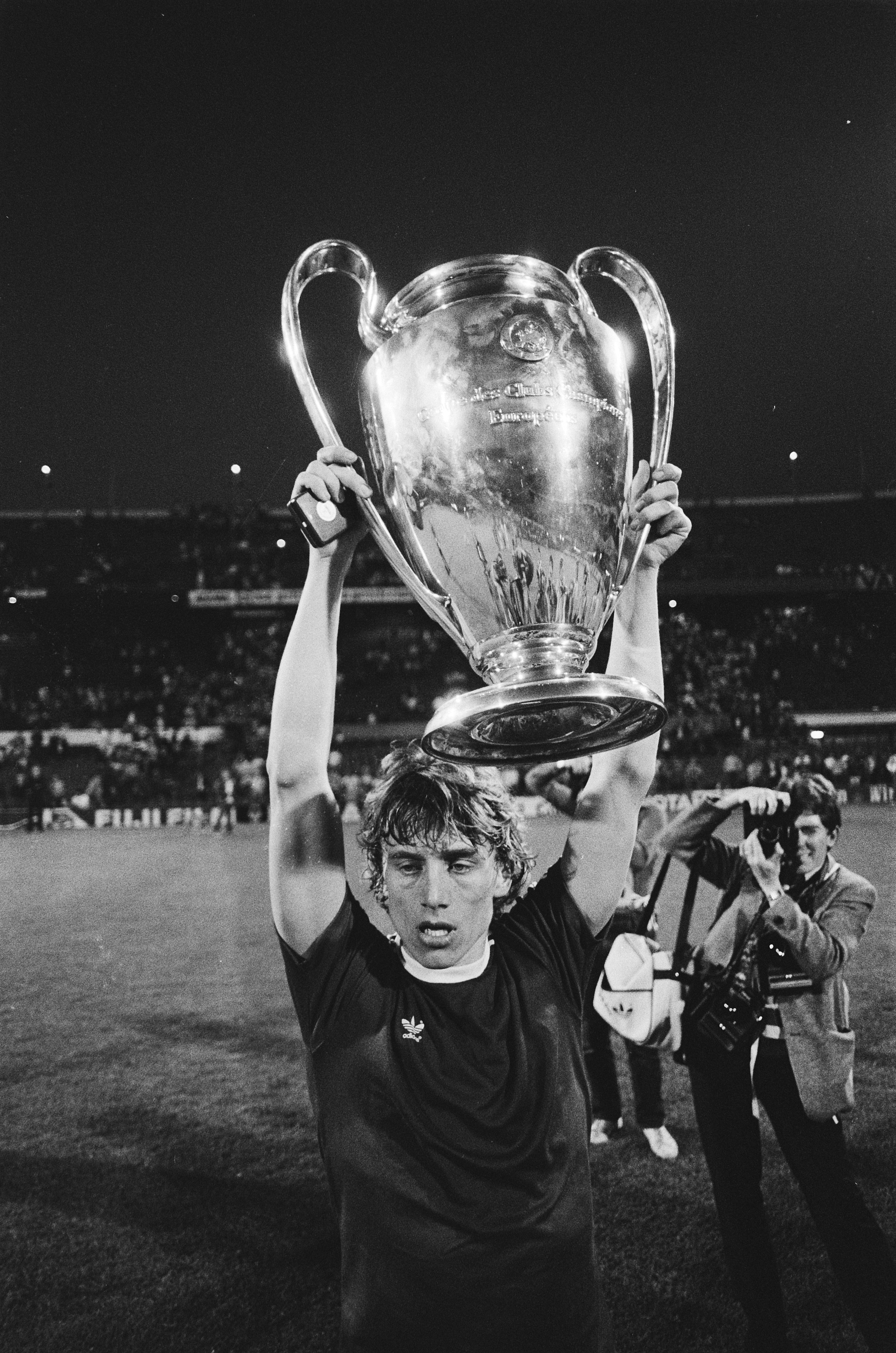
Tony Morley after winning the 1982 European Cup on 26 May

Morley was born in Ormskirk, and represented Ormskirk and District Schools. He signed as an apprentice with Preston North End in July 1969, before turning professional in August 1972. In February 1976 he moved across Lancashire to join Burnley for a £100,000 fee. He joined Aston Villa for £200,000 in June 1979.

A skilful, nippy winger, Morley enjoyed the best days of his career at Villa Park. He was seen as a wayward genius but was moulded by manager Ron Saunders into one of the most dangerous players around. He was famed for scoring spectacular goals, in particular, one against Everton at Goodison Park where he ran at the defence before striking right footed from outside the penalty area into the top left corner of the net. This goal won him the 'Goal of the Season' award for 1980–81.

He was a vital part of the Villa side that won the League Championship in 1980–81 and the European Cup the year after. His brilliant dribble and cross set up Peter Withe for the winning goal against Bayern Munich in the final. His full Villa record was 170 (+10 as sub) appearances, 34 goals.

After adding a European Super Cup winners' medal to his collection, he was transferred from Villa to local rivals West Bromwich Albion. He spent two seasons there, including briefly going on loan to another Midlands club, Birmingham City. He had a slightly nomadic career from then on, joining Seiko, Den Haag (with whom he won a runners-up medal in the Dutch Cup, scoring in the final), a return to West Brom, a brief spell on loan to Burnley, Tampa Bay Rowdies, before finishing his career at Hamrun Spartans.

== International career ==
Morley represented England at youth, under-23 and B international level.

Morley won six caps for England, but his career fell into decline after not being picked for any of their games at the 1982 World Cup. This despite the fact that England boss Ron Greenwood supposedly favoured attacking football. He failed to score in any of his six senior appearances for England, his first cap occurring on 18 November 1981 in England's 1–0 World Cup qualification clincher against Hungary, the last coming almost exactly a year later when he took to the field in a Euro 84 qualifier against Greece which England won 3–0. Morley was not selected for the England squad for the 1982 World Cup in Spain, with Greenwood opting for Arsenal's Graham Rix instead.

== Honours ==
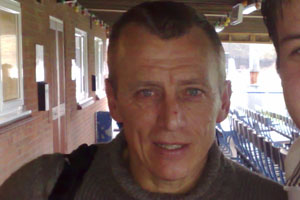
Morley in 2007

Aston Villa

- Football League First Division: 1980–81
- FA Charity Shield: 1981 (shared)
- European Cup: 1981–82
- European Super Cup: 1982
- Intercontinental Cup: runner-up 1982

Den Haag

- KNVB Cup: runner-up 1986–87

== See also ==
- "Tony Morley". Post War English & Scottish Football League A – Z Player's Database. Neil Brown.
- "Tony Morley". The Football Association.
