= Allan Evans (footballer) =

Scottish footballer (born 1956)

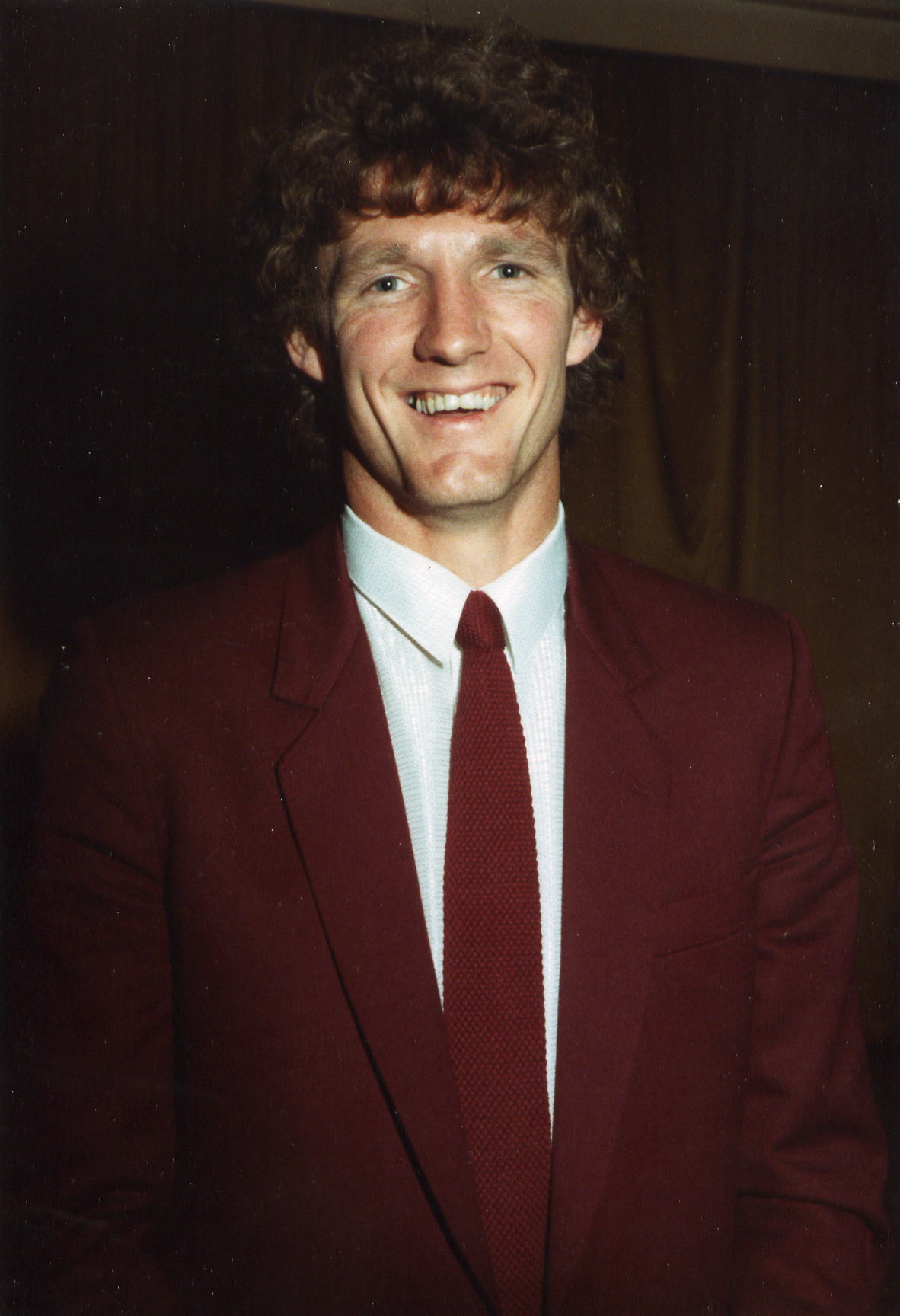

Personal information
- Full name: Allan James Evans
- Date of birth: 12 October 1956 (age 70)
- Place of birth: Dunfermline, Scotland
- Height: 6 ft 0 in (1.83 m)
- Position: Defender

Senior career*
Years	Team	Apps	(Gls)
1973–1977	Dunfermline Athletic	98	(14)
1977–1989	Aston Villa	380	(51)
1989–1990	Leicester City	14	(0)
1990	Victoria Vistas	27	(7)
1990–1991	Darlington	1	(0)
Total		516	(72)

International career
1982	Scotland	4	(0)

Managerial career
- 2000: West Bromwich Albion
- 2000–2001: Greenock Morton
- * Club domestic league appearances and goals

Allan James Evans (born 12 October 1956) is a Scottish former footballer who played for Dunfermline Athletic (1973–77), Aston Villa (1977–89), Leicester City (1989–90) and Darlington (1990–91).

== Playing career ==
Evans began his senior career as a forward, at his hometown club, Dunfermline Athletic.

His career peaked at Aston Villa, where he formed a pivotal centre back partnership with Ken McNaught. They won the English league title in 1980–81 and were part of Villa's 1982 European Cup winning team. He played in the Aston Villa team that beat Barcelona 3–0 at Villa Park to win the over two legs to win the Super Cup in the following season. Evans later became Villa club captain and helped them win promotion back to the First Division in 1988.

He finished his playing career with short, uneventful spells at Leicester City, Victoria Vistas, and Darlington before retiring in 1991.

Evans won four caps for Scotland, all in 1982, and was a member of their 1982 World Cup squad.

== Coaching ==
Evans returned to Aston Villa as assistant manager in 1995.

Evans also managed Torpoint Athletic F.C. where he invited Aston Villa to Torpoint's home ground during the pre-season of 1995/96.

Evans also managed Saltash United.

On 19 May 2007, Evans was appointed as a youth team coach at Plymouth Argyle F.C.

Evans is the first team coach of Truro College's Football Development Programme.

== Honours ==
Aston Villa

- Football League First Division: 1980–81
- FA Charity Shield: 1981 (shared)
- European Cup: 1981–82
- European Super Cup: 1982

Sporting positions
Preceded by Dennis Mortimer	Aston Villa F.C. Captain; 1984–1989	Succeeded by Stuart Gray
