= Dennis Mortimer =

English footballer (born 1952)

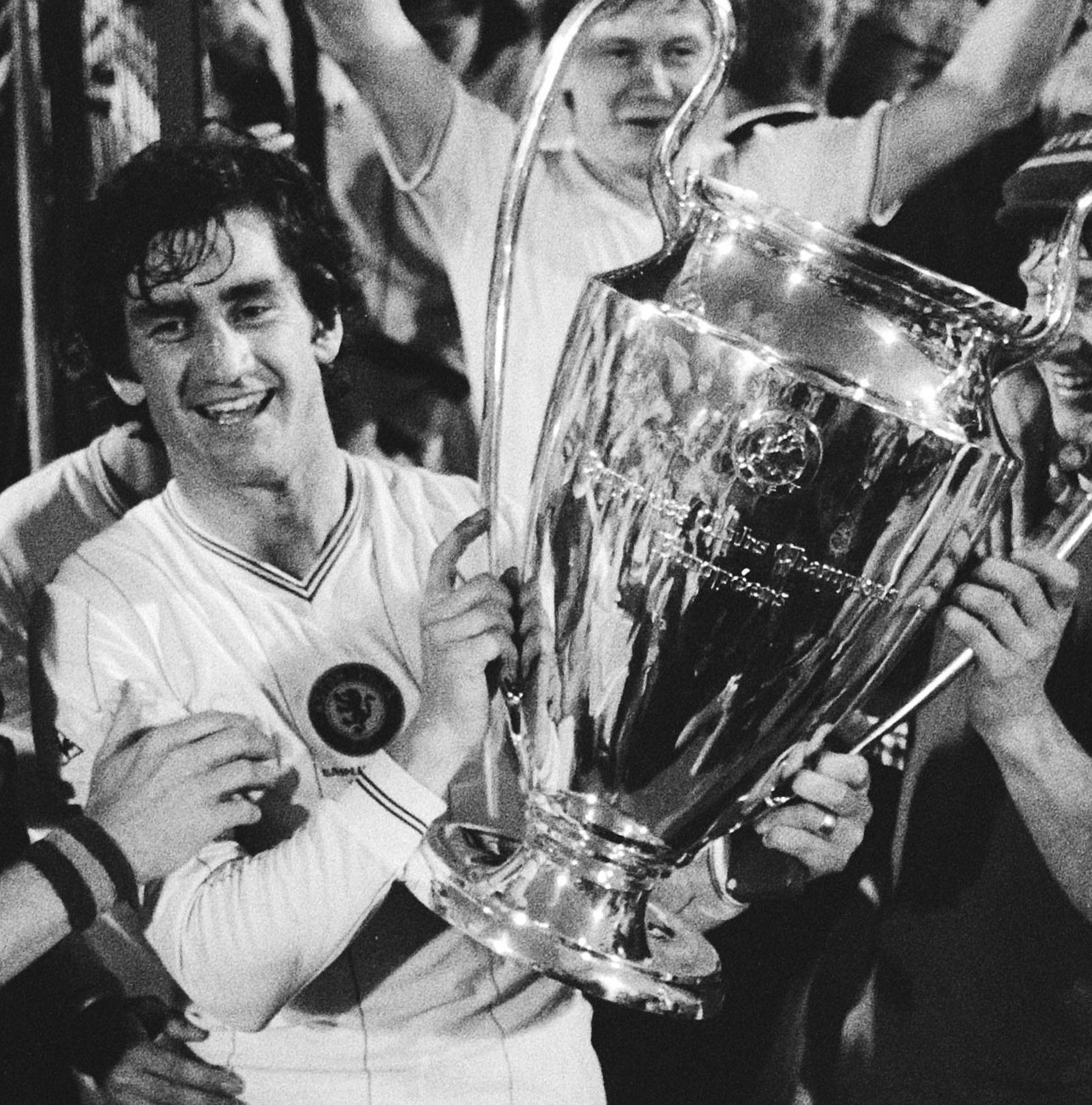
- Mortimer with the European Cup in 1982

Personal information
- Full name: Dennis George Mortimer
- Date of birth: 5 April 1952 (age 74)
- Place of birth: Liverpool, England
- Height: 5 ft 10 in (1.78 m)
- Position: Midfielder

Youth career
- Coventry City

Senior career*
Years	Team	Apps	(Gls)
1969–1975	Coventry City	193	(10)
1975–1985	Aston Villa	317	(31)
1985	→ Sheffield United (loan)	7	(0)
1985–1986	Brighton & Hove Albion	40	(2)
1986–1987	Birmingham City	33	(4)
- Redditch United
Total		590	(47)

International career
1972–1973	England U23	6	(2)
1978–1980	England B	3	(0)
- * Club domestic league appearances and goals

Dennis George Mortimer (born 5 April 1952) is an English former footballer who played as a midfielder and captained Aston Villa. He made nearly 600 appearances in the Football League playing for Coventry City, Aston Villa, Sheffield United, Brighton & Hove Albion and Birmingham City.

== Playing career ==
Mortimer was born in Liverpool. He began his career with Coventry City, where he came through the ranks to make more than 200 first-team appearances as a midfielder. His displays for Coventry attracted the attention of several top clubs, and he joined Aston Villa for £175,000 on Christmas Eve 1975.

Mortimer captained Villa to the 1980–81 Football League championship, the club's first League title for more than 70 years. He then led the team to victory in the 1982 European Cup Final; a 1–0 win against Bayern Munich in the De Kuip Stadium came courtesy of Peter Withe's goal, and made it six consecutive seasons that English teams had lifted the trophy. After the game, he swapped shirts with an unknown Bayern player, and has since tried and failed to recover it.

From 1975 to 1985 he made 406 appearances for Villa scoring 36 goals.

After leaving Villa, Mortimer moved to Brighton & Hove Albion but was only there a year before returning to the Midlands with Birmingham City, thereby breaking the second-city taboo by playing for City and Villa.

Mortimer was capped by England at youth and under-23 level and captained England B, but was never capped for the full England team.

== Post-playing career ==
During the 1988–89 season, Mortimer was player-manager of non-league club Redditch United. Mortimer became the PFA football in the community officer at West Bromwich Albion F.C. in 1991. Later he would become reserve team coach under the management of Ossie Ardiles and Keith Burkinshaw. When Ardiles left to coach Tottenham Hotspur F.C. Burkinshaw became manager and Mortimer moved up to first team coach.

He worked for The Professional Football Association as regional director of coaching in the Midlands area from 1996 to 2005. Mortimer joined the Birmingham City Football in the Community coaching scheme in 2006–2007. Mortimer joined the Football Association education coaching department in 2008 where he worked until the end of 2015. Mortimer is now retired. He provided commentary for BBC West Midlands Radio when he first retired from the game.

Mortimer received an honorary doctorate from the University of Worcester in 2011 for "his outstanding contribution to football".

In January 2024, Mortimer was named by Aston Villa as a member of the Honorary Anniversary Board ahead of the club's 150th anniversary season.

== Honours ==
Aston Villa

- Football League First Division: 1980–81
- Football League Cup: 1976–77
- FA Charity Shield: 1981 (shared)
- European Cup: 1981–82
- European Super Cup: 1982
- Intercontinental Cup runner-up: 1982
