= Tony Barton (footballer) =

English footballer (1937–1993)

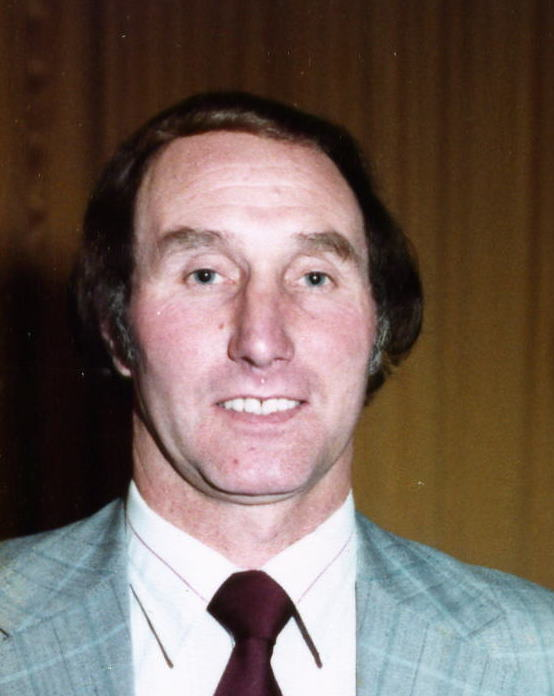
- Barton as Aston Villa manager

Personal information
- Full name: Anthony Edward Barton
- Date of birth: 8 April 1937
- Place of birth: Sutton, Surrey, England
- Date of death: 20 August 1993 (aged 56)
- Position: Outside right

Senior career*
Years	Team	Apps	(Gls)
1954–1959	Fulham	49	(8)
1959–1961	Nottingham Forest	22	(1)
1961–1967	Portsmouth	130	(34)
Total		201	(43)

Managerial career
- 1982–1984: Aston Villa
- 1984–1985: Northampton Town
- 1991: Portsmouth (caretaker)
- * Club domestic league appearances and goals

Anthony Edward Barton (8 April 1937 – 20 August 1993) was an English footballer, playing as an outside right, and football manager. He managed Aston Villa to victory in the 1982 European Cup, three months after taking charge. He also guided Villa to victory in the 1982 European Super Cup against Barcelona.

== Playing career ==
Barton was born in Sutton, Surrey. He won England Schoolboy (one cap) and Youth (five caps) honours before beginning his football career with Fulham who he joined as a junior. After a spell on loan to Sutton United, he turned professional with Fulham in May 1954. In December 1956 he became unavailable for Fulham when posted to Cyprus by the RAF. By November 1957 he had completed his RAF service and returned to face Watford. He went on to score 8 times in 49 games for Fulham.

He moved to Nottingham Forest in December 1959, making 22 appearances. He moved to Portsmouth in December 1961, where he subsequently became player-coach. A knee injury kept him out of the game for 18 months before he was forced to retire in December 1967. After retiring as a player, after 130 games and 34 goals for Portsmouth, he remained on the club's coaching staff, replacing Bill Poynton as Portsmouth's chief scout.

== Coaching and managerial career ==
He subsequently joined the coaching staff at Aston Villa, becoming assistant manager to Ron Saunders in 1980. Villa won the League Championship in 1981 (their first league title in 71 years) and Barton became Villa's manager in February 1982 after Saunders resigned.

He guided Villa to victory over Bayern Munich in the 1982 European Cup Final and followed this up with the 1982 European Super Cup the following season, but their league form (sixth in 1983 and tenth in 1984) did not match their success in European competitions and he was dismissed in May 1984.

In July 1984, he took over as manager of Northampton Town but left in April 1985 after suffering a heart attack. In September that year he became assistant manager of Southampton under Chris Nicholl, remaining at The Dell until May 1988. He later became assistant manager of Portsmouth and in March 1991 took over as caretaker manager after the dismissal of Frank Burrows. After leaving Portsmouth he was a talent scout for several clubs.

On 20 August 1993, Barton died of a heart attack at the age of 56.

== Honours ==
=== As a manager ===
Aston Villa

- European Cup: 1981–82
- European Super Cup: 1982

== Sources ==
- Mike Neasom, Mick Cooper & Doug Robinson (1984). Pompey: The History of Portsmouth Football Club. Milestone Publications. ISBN 0-903852-50-0.
