= Ken McNaught =

Scottish footballer

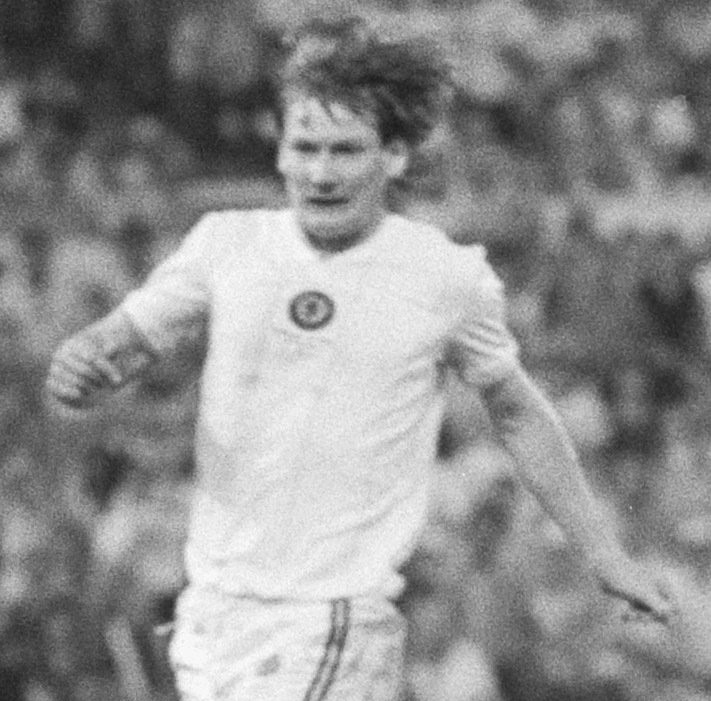
- Ken McNaught in the 1982 European Champions Cup final

Personal information
- Date of birth: 11 January 1955 (age 71)
- Place of birth: Kirkcaldy, Scotland
- Height: 5 ft 11 in (1.80 m)
- Position: Centre back

Senior career*
Years	Team	Apps	(Gls)
1974–1977	Everton	66	(3)
1977–1983	Aston Villa	207	(8)
1983–1984	West Bromwich Albion	42	(1)
1984–1985	Manchester City (loan)	7	(0)
1985–1986	Sheffield United	34	(5)
Total		356	(17)
- * Club domestic league appearances and goals

Ken McNaught (born 11 January 1955) is a Scottish former footballer who played for Aston Villa from 1977 to 1983. He was Aston Villa's record signing and was part of their Championship winning side of 1981, European Cup victory in 1982 and won the European Super Cup in 1982 against Barcelona, scoring one of Villa's goals in the latter final. McNaught's father was Scottish international footballer Willie McNaught.

== Background ==
Willie McNaught, originally from Dumfries, was on his service during World War II when he was spotted by a Raith Rovers official who promptly offered to sign him. McNaught senior as such relocated to Kirkcaldy (and went on to break the club appearances record); It was here that Ken McNaught was born in 1955.

== Everton ==
Clearly inheriting the talents of his internationalist father, Ken McNaught was signed by Everton as an apprentice. His league debut came in 1974–75 and he went to make 66 league appearances for the Toffees over the next three seasons. He played for Everton against Aston Villa in the 1977 League Cup Final, a contest that went to two replays. McNaught played in all three games and collected a runners up medal.

== Aston Villa ==
After impressing in the final against Villa he was signed by the Birmingham club in the 1977 close-season. He was 22 at the time. It was at Villa where McNaught's career reached its zenith with silverware in the League, European Cup and European Super Cup in which he scored against Barcelona.

== Later career ==
McNaught spent a season at West Bromwich Albion where he was a first team regular playing in 42 league games. The season after he was loaned out to Manchester City, 1984–85 season, where he made seven league appearances. His last season was with Sheffield United where he played 34 league games. He was then forced to retire early.

== International ==
Unlike his father who won five full Scotland caps, Ken McNaught never played for Scotland. He and Andy Blair and John McGovern are the only three Scots to win UEFA's premier club competition to never be given a full cap.

== Honours ==
Everton

- Football League Cup runner-up: 1976–77

Aston Villa

- Football League First Division: 1980–81
- FA Charity Shield: 1981 (shared)
- European Cup: 1981–82
- European Super Cup: 1982
- Intercontinental Cup runner-up: 1982
