= Peter Withe =

English footballer (born 1951)

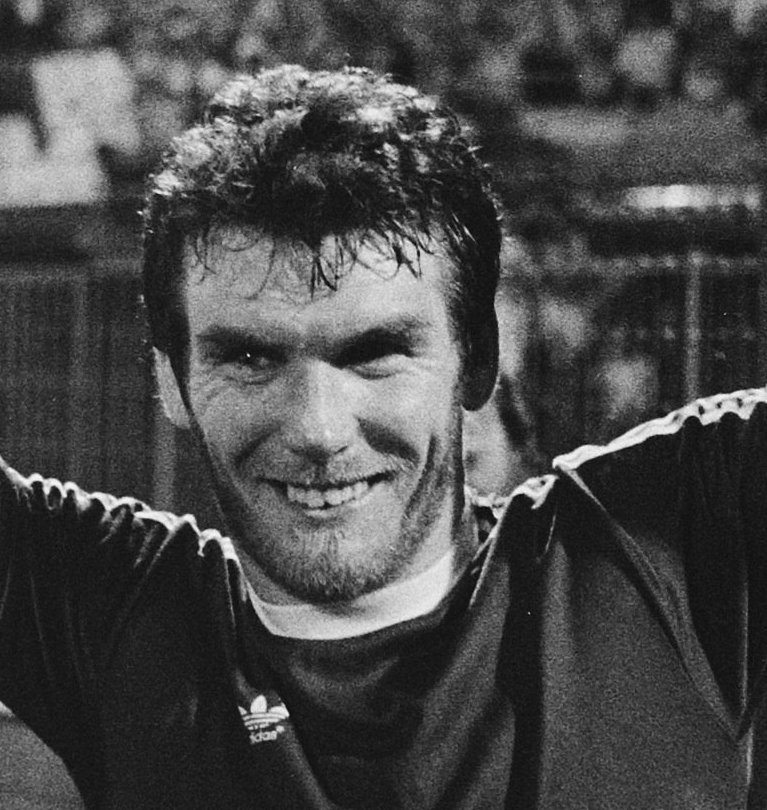
- Withe in 1982

Personal information
- Date of birth: 30 August 1951 (age 75)
- Place of birth: Liverpool, England
- Height: 6 ft 2 in (1.88 m)
- Position: Forward

Senior career*
Years	Team	Apps	(Gls)
1970–1971	Southport	3	(0)
1971–1972	Barrow	1	(0)
1972–1973	Port Elizabeth City		(15)
1973	Arcadia Shepherds	26	(16)
1973–1975	Wolverhampton Wanderers	17	(3)
1975	Portland Timbers	22	(16)
1975–1976	Birmingham City	35	(9)
1976–1978	Nottingham Forest	75	(28)
1978–1980	Newcastle United	76	(25)
1980–1985	Aston Villa	182	(74)
1985–1989	Sheffield United	74	(18)
1987	→ Birmingham City (loan)	8	(2)
1989–1990	Huddersfield Town	38	(1)
1991	Aston Villa	0	(0)
Total		539	(177)

International career
1981–1984	England	11	(1)

Managerial career
- 1991–1992: Wimbledon
- 1998–2003: Thailand
- 2004–2007: Indonesia
- 2012: Stockport Sports
- 2013–2014: PTT Rayong
- 2014–2016: Nakhon Pathom United
Medal record
Men's football
Representing Thailand (as manager)
AFF Championship
Winner	2000
Winner	2002
Representing Indonesia (as manager)
Runner-up	2004
- * Club domestic league appearances and goals

Peter Withe (/ˈwɪð/; born 30 August 1951) is an English former football manager and forward who played between 1971 and 1990. At Nottingham Forest he won the Anglo-Scottish Cup and Second Division promotion in 1976–77, First Division and the Football League Cup in 1977–78, and the 1978 FA Charity Shield. After a spell at Newcastle, he was Aston Villa's record signing with whom he won the First Division 1980–81, going on to score the only goal in the 1982 European Cup final and also win the 1982 European Super Cup. He played for England 11 times, scoring once, and was a squad member at the 1982 FIFA World Cup.

After his playing career, Withe worked as a manager, predominantly in Southeast Asia.

== Club career ==
=== Early career ===
Born in Liverpool, Withe started as an apprentice electrician supporting Everton from the terraces. He began his football career at Southport but left in 1971 after a handful of appearances. Late that year he made an appearance for the reserve team of Preston North End but soon moved on to Barrow for whom he made one appearance (against his former club Southport on 1 January 1972). After this he played in South Africa.

Withe played for Wolverhampton Wanderers in two seasons from 1973. In 17 league games he scored three goals.

During the summer of 1975, Withe spent one season in the United States as a member of the expansion Portland Timbers of the North American Soccer League (NASL). He scored 17 goals and added 7 assists in 22 games, leading the Timbers to first place in their division, and tied for the best record in the league at 16–6. Withe's goals that summer made him a Timbers fan favourite, who nicknamed him "The Mad Header" and "The Wizard of Nod". In August the Timbers played two home play-off games in front of more than 30,000 fans each, numbers unheard of for US soccer at the time. They advanced to Soccer Bowl '75, the League Championship final, in San Jose, California on 24 August, where they lost to the Tampa Bay Rowdies 2–0.

Withe returned to the West Midlands to join Birmingham City in 1975. He scored nine goals in 35 league games in just over a season before departing early in the 1976–77 season.

=== Nottingham Forest ===
Brian Clough joined Nottingham Forest as manager in January 1975. In the summer of 1976 he was joined by Peter Taylor, who had been his assistant at Derby County in winning the 1971–72 Football League. From Taylor's arrival Forest immediately went into upswing. Forest signed the 25-year-old Withe to make his debut for the club on 25 September 1976. He scored on his debut in a 5–1 Football League Second Division home win v Carlisle United with strike partner John O'Hare also scoring. Withe was given a new strike partner on 3 November 1976 in an Anglo-Scottish Cup 2–0 win at Ayr United. Tony Woodcock was recalled to the first team, bringing speed and anticipation to the front two to complement Withe's height, strength and power. Withe and Woodcock both scored at Ayr. Withe ended the season as the club top scorer with 19 goals and Woodcock second with 17 and Forest's Player of the Year despite his November seasonal debut. Forest's first trophy of the Clough and Taylor regime was in December that season beating Orient over two legs in the Anglo-Scottish Cup final. Withe played in the 1–1 first leg away draw on 13 December 1976 but then spent two weeks out the side missing the 4–0 second leg win. Forest won promotion at the end of the season to the top tier from finishing third in Division Two.

Withe and Woodcock won the 1977–78 Football League First Division and 1977–78 Football League Cup with Forest. They ended the season as Forest's joint top scorers with 19 goals each. Withe scored in the 1978 FA Charity Shield 5–0 win against Ipswich Town on 12 August 1978. After playing in the 1–1 league home draw the week after against Tottenham Hotspur, Forest agreed to sell him for £225,000 just before his 27th birthday at the end of that month. Withe scored 39 goals in 99 competitive first team games for Forest. This included 28 goals in 75 league games. His place in the next three games was given to league debutant Steve Elliott; all of them ended goalless. The number 9 jersey was then given to 22-year-old Garry Birtles who promptly became a regular first choice, winning the European Cup with Forest in this season and the following one.

=== Newcastle United ===
Withe joined Newcastle United then in the Second Division for a transfer fee of £225,000. He debuted in a 1–1 home draw v Luton Town In just under two seasons he scored 25 goals in 76 league games.

=== Aston Villa ===
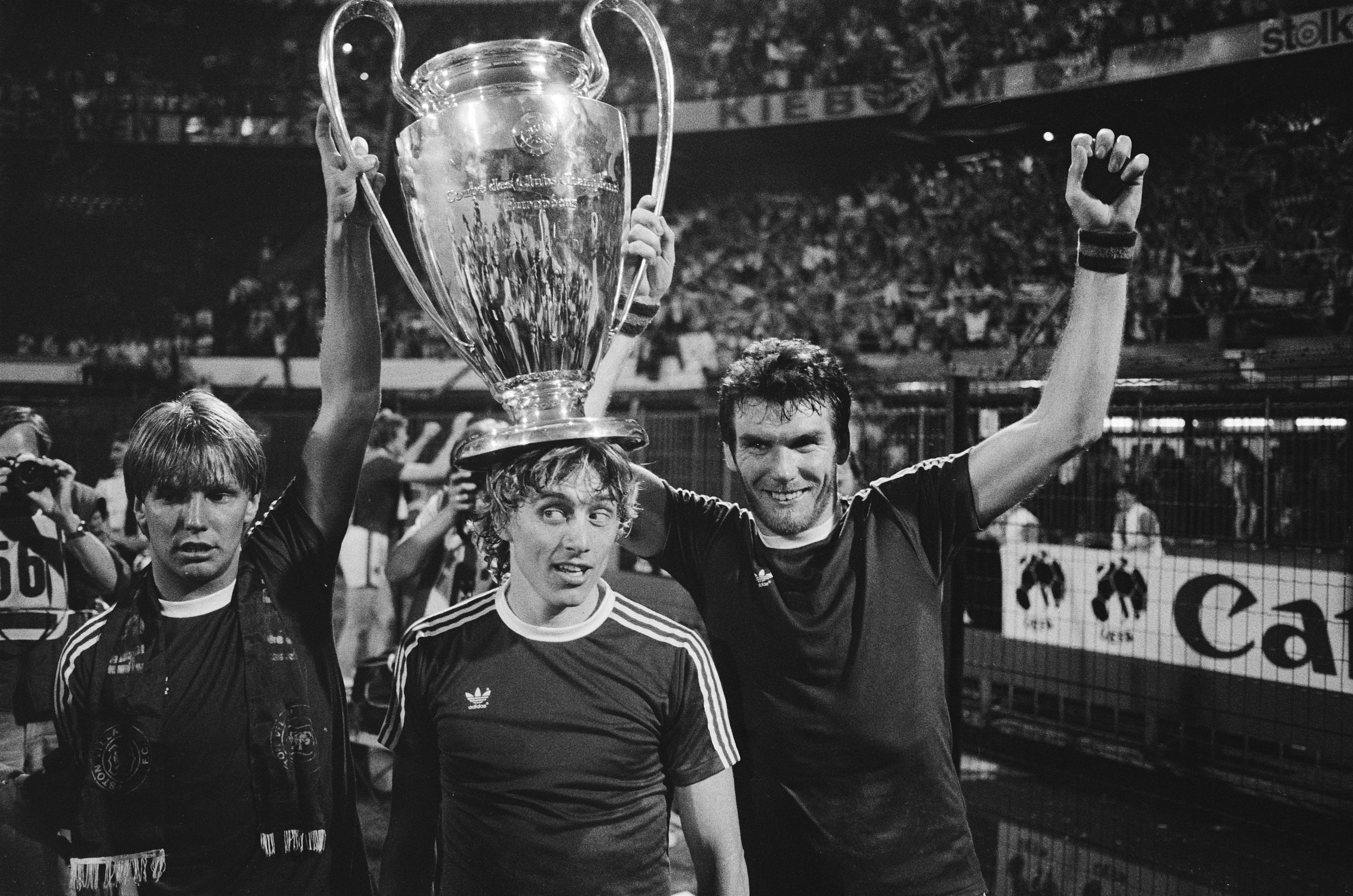
Peter Withe (right) with Gary Shaw and Tony Morley after winning the 1982 European Cup on 26 May

Ron Saunders took him to Aston Villa on the eve of the 1980–81 season when the Birmingham club paid £500,000 for the club's record signing at the time. He was 29 at the end of the month that league season started. Withe was paired with Gary Shaw whose pace and anticipation gave Withe a strike partner with playing similarities to Tony Woodcock when Withe was at Forest. Withe won a trophy in each of his first three seasons at Villa Park. Withe scored 20 times in 36 games to finish joint-top scorer in the league with Tottenham Hotspur's Steve Archibald in that first season as Aston Villa won the Football League title. Withe and Spurs' Mark Falco both scored twice sharing the 1981 FA Charity Shield from a 2–2 draw.

Withe scored the only goal in the 1982 European Cup final win against Bayern Munich. The season after Withe played in the 1982 European Super Cup 3–1 aggregate win against FC Barcelona.

Withe scored 90 goals in over 200 games for Villa. After five years he eventually moved on in what he later described as "the biggest wrench of my career."

=== Later career ===
Withe joined Sheffield United scoring 18 goals in 74 league games in three seasons from 1985 to 1988. In his last season there he scored twice in eight league games on loan back at ex-club, Birmingham City. Both of these goals were actually against Sheffield United. They let him play on loan in a match, where goalkeeper Roger Hansbury had gone on loan the other way. He ended his senior playing days scoring once in 38 league games at Huddersfield Town between 1988 and 1990.

== International career ==
Withe's England debut was in a 1–0 home friendly defeat by Brazil on 12 May 1981. His first four England caps were all without victory with a draw with Wales and defeats by Scotland and Norway. Capped by England 11 times, Withe scored once, and was the first Aston Villa player to be selected in an England World Cup Finals squad (in Spain 1982). His goal was against Hungary on 27 April 1983 in his 7th cap. His last cap was on 14 November 1984 when Turkey were beaten 8–0. Withe ended his international career with 5 wins, 3 draws and 3 defeats.

== Style of play ==
Withe was a big, tall, strong, powerful and imposing centre-forward. Dangerous in the air, his ability to shield the ball was also an asset to teammates. His biggest successes were when paired with a sharp, quick strike partner.

== Managerial career ==
Withe returned to Aston Villa in a coaching capacity in January 1991. During this time, he also made one playing appearance for Villa's reserve team.

Withe had a brief spell as manager of Wimbledon, being brought in from the position of reserve team coach at Aston Villa in October 1991 following Ray Harford's resignation. Withe's time in charge was not at all successful, winning only one game out of thirteen in the league, and after many players expressed their dislike of his methods, he was dismissed after just 105 days at the helm and replaced by the club's youth team coach Joe Kinnear.

Withe went into management and, after propelling the Thailand national team towards some success, managed Indonesia until 18 January 2007. He was sacked due to his side's inability to go past the first round of the ASEAN Football Championship, the tournament which he previously won with Thailand in 2000 and 2002, then finished as the runner-up with Indonesia in 2004. He was given a brief touchline ban as manager of Thailand for wearing shorts during an international match against the United Arab Emirates. The head of the Thai Football Association said he should be wearing a suit.

He managed English non-league club Stockport Sports from April to November 2012.

== Personal life ==
His brother, Chris, played for Bradford City. Withe's son, Jason, also became a footballer, coach and manager.

== Honours ==
=== As a player ===
Portland Timbers

- North American Soccer League: 1975

Nottingham Forest

- Football League First Division: 1977–78
- Football League Cup: 1977–78
- FA Charity Shield: 1978
- Anglo-Scottish Cup: 1976

Aston Villa

- Football League First Division: 1980–81
- FA Charity Shield: 1981
- European Cup: 1981–82
- European Super Cup: 1982

Individual

- Newcastle United Player of the Year: 1978–79

=== As a manager ===
Thailand

- ASEAN Football Championship: 2000, 2002
- Southeast Asian Games: 1999

Indonesia

- ASEAN Football Championship runner-up: 2004
