= 1983–84 Birmingham City F.C. season =

Birmingham City F.C.
1983–84 season
- Chairman: Keith Coombs
- Manager: Ron Saunders
- Ground: St Andrew's
- Football League First Division: 20th (relegated)
- FA Cup: Sixth round (eliminated by Watford)
- League Cup: Fourth round (eliminated by Liverpool)
- Top goalscorer: League: Mick Harford, Howard Gayle (8); All: Mick Harford (15)
- Highest home attendance: 40,220 vs Watford, FA Cup 6th round, 10 March 1984
- Lowest home attendance: 7,786 vs Derby County, League Cup 2nd round, 25 October 1983
- Average home league attendance: 14,106
Home colours

The 1983–84 Football League season was Birmingham City Football Club's 81st in the Football League and their 49th in the First Division. They finished in 20th position in the 22-team division, so were relegated to the Second Division for 1984–85. They entered the 1983–84 FA Cup in the third round proper and lost to Watford in the quarter-final. In the League Cup, after defeating Notts County in the third round only after three replays, they lost to Liverpool in the fourth round after a replay.

Mick Harford was the club's top scorer with 15 goals in all competitions; if only league games are counted, Harford and Howard Gayle were joint leaders with 8. The highest attendance, of 40,220 against Watford in the FA Cup sixth round, was the last 40,000 crowd seen at St Andrew's, as of 2012; the ground capacity was reduced to around 30,000 when the stadium was converted to all-seater in the 1990s.

== Football League First Division ==
Date	League position	Opponents	Venue	Result	Score F–A	Scorers	Attendance
27 August 1983	21st	West Ham United	A	L	0–4		19,729
30 August 1983	22nd	Notts County	A	L	1–2	Harford	11,031
3 September 1983	17th	Watford	H	W	2–0	Hopkins, Halsall	11,931
6 September 1983	11th	Stoke City	H	W	1–0	Blake pen	13,728
10 September 1983	10th	Wolverhampton Wanderers	A	D	1–1	Wright pen	15,933
17 September 1983	10th	Ipswich Town	H	W	1–0	Gayle	13,159
24 September 1983	12th	Everton	A	D	1–1	Gayle	15,254
1 October 1983	8th	Leicester City	H	W	2–1	Rees, Harford	15,212
15 October 1983	12th	Aston Villa	A	L	0–1		39,318
22 October 1983	15th	Tottenham Hotspur	H	L	0–1		18,937
29 October 1983	13th	West Bromwich Albion	A	W	2–1	Gayle, Harford	20,109
5 November 1983	14th	Coventry City	H	L	1–2	Blake	16,169
12 November 1983	14th	Luton Town	A	D	1–1	Hopkins	11,111
19 November 1983	15th	Queens Park Rangers	A	L	1–2	Harford	10,824
26 November 1983	16th	Sunderland	H	L	0–1		11,948
3 December 1983	17th	Liverpool	A	L	0–1		24,791
10 December 1983	17th	Norwich City	H	L	0–1		9,971
17 December 1983	17th	Southampton	A	L	1–2	Stevenson	15,248
26 December 1983	19th	Nottingham Forest	H	L	1–2	Rogers	14,482
27 December 1983	19th	Arsenal	A	D	1–1	Hopkins	25,642
31 December 1983	19th	Watford	A	L	0–1		14,403
2 January 1984	19th	Everton	H	L	0–2		10,004
14 January 1984	19th	West Ham United	H	W	3–0	Hopkins, Halsall, Harford	10,334
21 January 1984	19th	Ipswich Town	A	W	2–1	Harford, Butcher og	12,884
4 February 1984	19th	Leicester City	A	W	3–2	Peake og, Gayle, Wright pen	13,776
7 February 1984	19th	Manchester United	H	D	2–2	Hopkins, Wright pen	19,957
11 February 1984	18th	Wolverhampton Wanderers	H	D	0–0		14,319
25 February 1984	15th	Tottenham Hotspur	A	W	1–0	Harford	23,564
28 February 1984	14th	West Bromwich Albion	H	W	2–1	Rees, Broadhurst	16,780
3 March 1984	14th	Coventry City	A	W	1–0	Gayle	13,696
17 March 1984	15th	Stoke City	A	L	1–2	Gayle	13,506
20 March 1984	15th	Luton Town	H	D	1–1	Wright pen	9,592
24 March 1984	13th	Notts County	H	D	0–0		9,040
31 March 1984	12th	Aston Villa	H	W	2–1	Stevenson, Gayle	23,993
7 April 1984	15th	Manchester United	A	L	0–1		39,896
14 April 1984	15th	Queens Park Rangers	H	L	0–2		10,255
21 April 1984	17th	Nottingham Forest	A	L	1–5	Harford	15,323
23 April 1984	17th	Arsenal	H	D	1–1	Kuhl	11,164
28 April 1984	18th	Sunderland	A	L	1–2	Wright pen	13,061
5 May 1984	19th	Liverpool	H	D	0–0		18,817
7 May 1984	18th	Norwich City	A	D	1–1	Gayle	12,111
12 May 1984	20th	Southampton	H	D	0–0		16,445

=== League table (part) ===
Final First Division table (part)
Pos	Team	Pld	W	D	L	GF	GA	GD	Pts
18th	Stoke City	42	13	11	18	44	63	−19	50
19th	Coventry City	42	13	11	18	57	77	−20	50
20th	Birmingham City	42	12	12	18	39	50	−11	48
21st	Notts County	42	10	11	21	50	72	−22	41
22nd	Wolverhampton Wanderers	42	6	11	25	27	80	−53	29

=== Results summary ===
Overall								Home						Away					
Pld	W	D	L	GF	GA	GD	Pts	W	D	L	GF	GA	GD	W	D	L	GF	GA	GD
42	12	12	18	39	50	−11	48	7	7	7	19	18	+1	5	5	11	20	32	−12

== FA Cup ==
Round	Date	Opponents	Venue	Result	Score F–A	Scorers	Attendance
Third round	7 January 1984	Sheffield United	A	D	1–1	Wright pen	17,202
Third round replay	10 January 1984	Sheffield United	H	W	2–0	Harford, Wright pen	10,888
Fourth round	28 January 1984	Sunderland	A	W	2–1	Kuhl, Harford	21,226
Fifth round	18 February 1984	West Ham United	H	W	3–0	Hopkins, Rees, Wright pen	29,570
Sixth round	10 March 1984	Watford	H	L	1–3	Terry og	40,220

== League Cup ==
Round	Date	Opponents	Venue	Result	Score F–A	Scorers	Attendance
Second round 1st leg	5 October 1983	Derby County	A	W	3–0	Watson og, Rees, Gayle	13,114
Second round 2nd leg	25 October 1983	Derby County	H	W	4–0	Harford 3, Gayle	7,786
Third round	8 November 1983	Notts County	H	D	2–2	Handysides, Phillips	10,484
Third round replay	22 November 1983	Notts County	A	D	0–0 aet		8,268
Third round 2nd replay	29 November 1983	Notts County	H	D	0–0 aet		9,678
Third round 3rd replay	5 December 1983	Notts County	A	W	3–1	Hopkins 2, Harford	7,361
Fourth round	20 December 1983	Liverpool	H	D	1–1	Harford	17,405
Fourth round replay	22 December 1983	Liverpool	A	L	0–3		11,638

== Appearances and goals ==
Numbers in parentheses denote appearances made as a substitute.
Players with name in italics and marked * were on loan from another club for the whole of their season with Birmingham.
Players marked † left the club during the playing season.
Key to positions: GK – Goalkeeper; DF – Defender; MF – Midfielder; FW – Forward

Players' appearances and goals by competition
Pos.	Nat.	Name	League		FA Cup		League Cup		Total	
Pos.	Nat.	Name	Apps	Goals	Apps	Goals	Apps	Goals	Apps	Goals
GK	ENG	Tony Coton	41	0	5	0	8	0	54	0
GK	ENG	Mark Kendall	1	0	0	0	0	0	1	0
DF	ENG	Noel Blake	39	2	5	0	8	0	52	2
DF	ENG	Kevan Broadhurst	22 (1)	1	5	0	0	0	27 (1)	1
DF	NIR	Jim Hagan	30 (3)	0	0	0	8	0	39 (3)	0
DF	ENG	Mark McCarrick	12 (3)	0	3	0	0 (1)	0	15 (4)	0
DF	ENG	Wayne Mumford	3 (2)	0	0	0	0	0	3 (2)	0
DF	ENG	Brian Roberts	11	0	0	0	0	0	11	0
DF	WAL	Pat Van Den Hauwe	42	0	5	0	8	0	55	0
DF	ENG	Billy Wright	40	5	5	3	8	0	53	8
MF	ENG	Mick Halsall	21	2	3	0	4 (1)	0	28 (1)	2
MF	ENG	Ian Handysides †	4 (1)	0	0	0	1	1	5 (1)	1
MF	ENG	Robert Hopkins	32	5	5	1	7	2	44	8
MF	ENG	Martin Kuhl	20 (2)	1	5	1	3	0	24 (2)	2
MF	ENG	Ivor Linton †	3 (1)	0	0	0	0	0	3 (1)	0
MF	ENG	Les Phillips †	18 (2)	0	0	0	8	1	26 (3)	1
MF	ENG	Kevin Rogers	8 (1)	1	0	0	0	0	8 (1)	1
MF	WAL	Byron Stevenson	21 (4)	2	4	0	6 (1)	0	31 (5)	2
FW	ENG	Howard Gayle *	32 (1)	8	4	0	8	2	44 (1)	10
FW	ENG	Mick Harford	39	8	5	2	7	5	51	15
FW	ENG	Ian Muir †	1	0	0	0	1	0	1	0
FW	WAL	Tony Rees	22 (3)	2	1	1	3	1	25 (3)	4

== See also ==
- Birmingham City F.C. seasons

== Sources ==
- Matthews, Tony (1995). Birmingham City: A Complete Record. Derby: Breedon Books. ISBN 978-1-85983-010-9.
- Matthews, Tony (2010). Birmingham City: The Complete Record. Derby: DB Publishing. ISBN 978-1-85983-853-2.
- For match dates, league positions and results: "Birmingham City 1983–1984 : Results". Statto Organisation. Archived from the original on 27 November 2015.
- For lineups, appearances, goalscorers and attendances: Matthews (2010), Complete Record, pp. 402–03.
