= 1985–86 Birmingham City F.C. season =

Birmingham City F.C.
1985–86 season
- Chairman: Keith Coombs; (until December 1985); Ken Wheldon
- Manager: Ron Saunders; (until 16 January 1986); Keith Leonard (caretaker); John Bond; (from 23 January)
- Ground: St Andrew's
- Football League First Division: 21st (relegated)
- FA Cup: Third round (eliminated by Altrincham)
- League Cup: Third round (eliminated by Southampton)
- Top goalscorer: League: Andy Kennedy (7); All: Andy Kennedy (9)
- Highest home attendance: 24,971 vs Aston Villa, 7 September 1985
- Lowest home attendance: 3,686 vs Bristol Rovers, League Cup 2nd round, 7 October 1985
- Average home league attendance: 10,899
Home colours

The 1985–86 Football League season was Birmingham City Football Club's 83rd in the Football League and their 50th in the First Division, to which they were promoted in 1984–85. They finished in 21st position in the 22-team division, so were relegated back to the Second Division after only one season. They entered the 1985–86 FA Cup in the third round proper and lost in that round, at home to non-league club Altrincham, a result that precipitated the resignation of Ron Saunders as manager. They were eliminated from the League Cup by Southampton in a third-round replay. John Bond succeeded Saunders as manager.

The top scorer was Andy Kennedy with just nine goals, of which seven were scored in league competition.

With the team already in the relegation positions, chairman Keith Coombs resigned in December 1985, selling his 70% shareholding to the former chairman of Walsall F.C., Ken Wheldon, who took over as chairman. The club's serious financial situation, not helped by low attendances, led to the departure of several senior administrative staff.

== Football League First Division ==
Date	League position	Opponents	Venue	Result	Score F–A	Scorers	Attendance
17 August 1985	5th	West Ham United	H	W	1–0	Hopkins	11,164
20 August 1985	11th	Watford	A	L	0–3		14,278
24 August 1985	17th	Chelsea	A	L	0–2		16,534
26 August 1985	9th	Oxford United	H	W	3–1	Kennedy, Briggs og, Hopkins	10,568
31 August 1985	12th	Everton	A	L	1–4	Kennedy	28,066
3 September 1985	10th	Manchester City	H	W	1–0	Geddis	11,706
7 September 1985	11th	Aston Villa	H	D	0–0		24,971
14 September 1985	10th	Ipswich Town	A	W	1–0	Geddis	11,616
21 September 1985	8th	Leicester City	H	W	2–1	Geddis 2	9,834
28 September 1985	10th	Queens Park Rangers	A	L	1–3	Armstrong	10,911
5 October 1985	12th	Sheffield Wednesday	H	L	0–2		11,708
19 October 1985	14th	West Bromwich Albion	A	L	1–2	Kennedy	14,576
26 October 1985	15th	Coventry City	H	L	0–1		9,267
2 November 1985	17th	Luton Town	A	L	0–2		8,550
9 November 1985	17th	Newcastle United	H	L	0–1		8,162
16 November 1985	17th	Southampton	A	L	0–1		13,167
23 November 1985	20th	Liverpool	H	L	0–2		15,062
30 November 1985	20th	Arsenal	A	D	0–0		16,673
7 December 1985	20th	Watford	H	L	1–2	Wright pen	7,043
14 December 1985	20th	West Ham United	A	L	0–2		17,481
21 December 1985	20th	Chelsea	H	L	1–2	Platnauer	10,594
26 December 1985	21st	Nottingham Forest	H	L	0–1		10,378
28 December 1985	21st	Manchester City	A	D	1–1	Geddis	24,055
1 January 1986	21st	Manchester United	A	L	0–1		43,095
11 January 1986	21st	Ipswich Town	H	L	0–1		6,856
18 January 1986	21st	Everton	H	L	0–2		10,502
1 February 1986	21st	Oxford United	A	W	1–0	Clarke	9,086
8 February 1986	21st	West Bromwich Albion	H	L	0–1		11,514
16 February 1986	21st	Coventry City	A	D	4–4	Kennedy 2, Whitton, Kuhl	14,271
1 March 1986	21st	Queens Park Rangers	H	W	2–0	Clarke pen, Hopkins	7,093
8 March 1986	21st	Sheffield Wednesday	A	L	1–5	Geddis	17,491
12 March 1986	21st	Leicester City	A	L	2–4	Clarke, Kennedy	8,458
15 March 1986	21st	Tottenham Hotspur	H	L	1–2	Kennedy	9,394
22 March 1986	21st	Aston Villa	A	W	3–0	Clarke 2, Whitton	26,294
29 March 1986	21st	Manchester United	H	D	1–1	Handysides	22,551
31 March 1986	21st	Nottingham Forest	A	L	0–3		13,134
6 April 1986	21st	Luton Town	H	L	0–2		8,836
12 April 1986	21st	Newcastle United	A	L	1–4	Hopkins	19,981
16 April 1986	21st	Tottenham Hotspur	A	L	0–2		9,359
19 April 1986	21st	Southampton	H	L	0–2		5,833
26 April 1986	21st	Liverpool	A	L	0–5		42,021
3 May 1986	21st	Arsenal	H	L	0–1		6,234

=== League table (part) ===
Final First Division table (part)
Pos	Team	Pld	W	D	L	GF	GA	GD	Pts
18th	Oxford United	42	10	12	20	62	80	−18	42
19th	Leicester City	42	10	12	20	54	76	−22	42
20th	Ipswich Town	42	11	8	23	32	55	−23	41
21st	Birmingham City	42	8	5	29	30	73	−43	29
22nd	West Bromwich Albion	42	4	12	26	35	89	−54	24

=== Results summary ===
Overall								Home						Away					
Pld	W	D	L	GF	GA	GD	Pts	W	D	L	GF	GA	GD	W	D	L	GF	GA	GD
42	8	5	29	30	73	−43	29	5	2	14	13	25	−12	3	3	15	17	48	−31

== FA Cup ==
Round	Date	Opponents	Venue	Result	Score F–A	Scorers	Attendance
Third round	14 January 1986	Altrincham	H	L	1–2	Hopkins	6,636

== League Cup ==
Round	Date	Opponents	Venue	Result	Score F–A	Scorers	Attendance
Second round 1st leg	24 September 1985	Bristol Rovers	A	W	3–2	Wright 2 (2 pens), Geddis	4,332
Second round 2nd leg	8 October 1985	Bristol Rovers	H	W	2–1	Kennedy, Tanner og	3,686
Third round	29 October 1985	Southampton	H	D	1–1	Kennedy	4,832
Third round replay	6 November 1985	Southampton	A	L	0–3		9,085

== Appearances and goals ==
Numbers in parentheses denote appearances made as a substitute.
Players with name in italics and marked * were on loan from another club for the whole of their season with Birmingham.
Players marked † left the club during the playing season.
Key to positions: GK – Goalkeeper; DF – Defender; MF – Midfielder; FW – Forward

Players' appearances and goals by competition
Pos.	Nat.	Name	League		FA Cup		League Cup		Total	
Pos.	Nat.	Name	Apps	Goals	Apps	Goals	Apps	Goals	Apps	Goals
GK	ENG	David Seaman	42	0	1	0	4	0	47	0
DF	ENG	Ken Armstrong	22	1	1	0	3	0	26	1
DF	ENG	Julian Dicks	18 (5)	0	1	0	1 (1)	0	20 (6)	0
DF	ENG	Billy Garton *	5	0	0	0	0	0	5	0
DF	NIR	Jim Hagan	31	0	1	0	3 (1)	0	35 (1)	0
DF	ENG	Mark Jones	19	0	0	0	3	0	22	0
DF	ENG	Ray Ranson	37	0	1	0	3	0	41	0
DF	ENG	Brian Roberts	31 (2)	0	1	0	4	0	36 (2)	0
DF	ENG	Mark Smalley *	7	0	0	0	0	0	7	0
DF	ENG	Billy Wright	29	1	0 (1)	0	3 (1)	2	32 (2)	3
MF	SCO	Des Bremner	32	0	1	0	3	0	36	0
MF	IRL	Gerry Daly †	2	0	0	0	0	0	2	0
MF	ENG	John Frain	1 (2)	0	0	0	0	0	1 (2)	0
MF	ENG	Ian Handysides	6	1	0	0	0	0	6	1
MF	ENG	Robert Hopkins	38	4	1	1	4	0	43	5
MF	ENG	Lee Jenkins †	1	0	0	0	0	0	1	0
MF	ENG	Martin Kuhl	33 (4)	1	1	0	3	0	37 (4)	1
MF	ENG	Nick Platnauer	12 (5)	1	1	0	3	0	16 (5)	1
MF	ENG	Billy Ronson *	2	0	0	0	0	0	2	0
MF	ENG	Stuart Storer	2	0	0	0	0	0	2	0
FW	ENG	Wayne Clarke	28	5	0	0	0	0	28	5
FW	ENG	David Geddis	25 (1)	6	0	0	3	0	28 (1)	6
FW	SCO	Andy Kennedy	27 (5)	7	1	0	4	2	32 (5)	9
FW	WAL	Tony Rees	4 (4)	0	0	0	0	0	4 (4)	0
FW	ENG	Guy Russell	0 (1)	0	0	0	0	0	0 (1)	0
FW	ENG	Steve Whitton	8	2	0	0	0	0	8	2

== See also ==
- Birmingham City F.C. seasons

== Sources ==
- Matthews, Tony (1995). Birmingham City: A Complete Record. Derby: Breedon Books. ISBN 978-1-85983-010-9.
- Matthews, Tony (2010). Birmingham City: The Complete Record. Derby: DB Publishing. ISBN 978-1-85983-853-2.
- For match dates, league positions and results: "Birmingham City 1985–1986: Results". Statto Organisation. Archived from the original on 9 August 2011.
- For lineups, appearances, goalscorers and attendances: Matthews (2010), Complete Record, pp. 406–07.
