= 1986–87 Birmingham City F.C. season =

Birmingham City F.C.
1986–87 season
- Chairman: Ken Wheldon
- Manager: John Bond
- Ground: St Andrew's
- Football League Second Division: 19th
- FA Cup: Fourth round (eliminated by Walsall)
- League Cup: Third round (eliminated by Tottenham Hotspur)
- Full Members' Cup: Second round (eliminated by Charlton Athletic)
- Top goalscorer: League: Wayne Clarke (16); All: Wayne Clarke (19)
- Highest home attendance: 12,209 vs Derby County, 30 August 1986
- Lowest home attendance: 3,794 vs Brighton & Hove Albion, Full Members' Cup 1st round, 1 October 1986
- Average home league attendance: 7,426
Home colours

The 1986–87 Football League season was Birmingham City Football Club's 84th in the Football League and their 34th in the Second Division, to which they were relegated in 1985–86. They finished in 19th position in the 22-team division, and avoided a second successive relegation only by two points. They entered the 1986–87 FA Cup in the third round proper and lost to Walsall in the fourth, and were eliminated from the League Cup in the third round by Tottenham Hotspur. They entered the second season of the Full Members' Cup, a competition created for teams in the top two divisions after English clubs were banned from UEFA competitions following the Heysel disaster, and lost in the second round away to Charlton Athletic in front of a crowd of less than a thousand.

The top scorer was Wayne Clarke with 19 goals, of which 16 were scored in league matches. The average attendance, of under 7,500, was a record low for a season at St Andrew's.

== Football League Second Division ==
Date	League position	Opponents	Venue	Result	Score F–A	Scorers	Attendance
23 August 1986	1st	Stoke City	A	W	2–0	Hemming og, Whitton	11,548
25 August 1986	1st	Bradford City	H	W	2–1	Mortimer 2	7,003
30 August 1986	1st	Derby County	H	D	1–1	Clarke	12,209
3 September 1986	3rd	Brighton & Hove Albion	A	L	0–2		9,955
6 September 1986	5th	Sheffield United	A	D	1–1	Bremner	10,297
13 September 1986	7th	Huddersfield Town	H	D	1–1	Clarke	6,934
20 September 1986	11th	Hull City	A	L	2–3	Clarke 2	6,851
27 September 1986	12th	Ipswich Town	H	D	2–2	Clarke 2	7,227
4 October 1986	12th	Barnsley	H	D	1–1	Kennedy	6,427
11 October 1986	17th	Portsmouth	A	L	0–2		11,252
18 October 1986	12th	Crystal Palace	H	W	4–1	Bremner, Overson, Whitton, Clarke	5,987
25 October 1986	14th	Sunderland	A	L	0–2		15,553
1 November 1986	17th	West Bromwich Albion	A	L	2–3	Lynex, Clarke	15,029
8 November 1986	18th	Oldham Athletic	H	L	1–3	Clarke pen	6,082
15 November 1986	16th	Millwall	A	W	2–0	Clarke, Rees	4,795
22 November 1986	11th	Leeds United	H	W	2–1	Clarke, Bremner	7,863
29 November 1986	9th	Grimsby Town	A	W	1–0	Whitton	4,734
6 December 1986	10th	Blackburn Rovers	H	D	1–1	Clarke	6,428
13 December 1986	13th	Shrewsbury Town	A	L	0–1		4,797
19 December 1986	9th	Sheffield United	H	W	2–1	Clarke 2 (1 pen)	5,007
26 December 1986	12th	Reading	A	D	2–2	Lynex, Clarke	7,662
29 December 1986	13th	Millwall	H	D	1–1	Mortimer	8,006
1 January 1987	11th	Plymouth Argyle	H	W	3–2	Kuhl, Clarke, Mortimer	8,696
3 January 1987	11th	Bradford City	A	D	0–0		8,679
24 January 1987	11th	Stoke City	H	D	0–0		10,643
7 February 1987	10th	Derby County	A	D	2–2	Bremner, Whitton	16,836
14 February 1987	8th	Brighton & Hove Albion	H	W	2–0	Rees 2	6,439
21 February 1987	9th	Ipswich Town	A	L	0–3		10,169
28 February 1987	11th	Hull City	H	D	0–0		6,858
3 March 1987	9th	Huddersfield Town	A	D	2–2	Whitton, Rees	5,177
14 March 1987	13th	Crystal Palace	A	L	0–6		6,171
21 March 1987	13th	Portsmouth	H	L	0–1		9,823
28 March 1987	13th	Barnsley	A	D	2–2	Whitton, Wigley	4,688
31 March 1987	10th	Sunderland	H	W	2–0	North, Whitton	5,563
4 April 1987	10th	Oldham Athletic	A	D	2–2	Whitton, Linighan og	6,555
11 April 1987	11th	West Bromwich Albion	H	L	0–1		11,158
18 April 1987	12th	Plymouth Argyle	A	D	0–0		13,372
20 April 1987	12th	Reading	H	D	1–1	Frain	5,427
25 April 1987	15th	Leeds United	A	L	0–4		19,133
2 May 1987	15th	Grimsby Town	H	W	1–0	Whitton	4,457
5 May 1987	16th	Blackburn Rovers	A	L	0–1		5,622
9 May 1987	19th	Shrewsbury Town	H	L	0–2		7,724

=== League table (part) ===
Final Second Division table (part)
Pos	Team	Pld	W	D	L	GF	GA	GD	Pts
17th	Huddersfield Town	42	13	12	17	54	61	−7	51
18th	Shrewsbury Town	42	15	6	21	41	53	−12	51
19th	Birmingham City	42	11	17	14	47	59	−12	50
20th	Sunderland	42	12	12	18	49	59	−10	48
21st	Grimsby Town	42	10	14	18	39	59	−20	44

=== Results summary ===
Overall								Home						Away					
Pld	W	D	L	GF	GA	GD	Pts	W	D	L	GF	GA	GD	W	D	L	GF	GA	GD
42	11	17	14	47	59	−12	50	8	9	4	27	21	+6	3	8	10	20	38	−18

== FA Cup ==
Round	Date	Opponents	Venue	Result	Score F–A	Scorers	Attendance
Third round	10 January 1987	Ipswich Town	A	W	1–0	Mortimer	11,616
Fourth round	31 January 1987	Walsall	A	L	0–1		14,810

== League Cup ==
Round	Date	Opponents	Venue	Result	Score F–A	Scorers	Attendance
Second round 1st leg	23 September 1986	Middlesbrough	A	D	2–2	Whitton, Mortimer	9,412
Second round 2nd leg	7 October 1986	Middlesbrough	H	W	3–2 aet	Clarke 2, Whitton	4,978
Third round	29 October 1986	Tottenham Hotspur	A	L	0–5		15,542

== Full Members' Cup ==
Round	Date	Opponents	Venue	Result	Score F–A	Scorers	Attendance
Third round	1 October 1986	Brighton & Hove Albion	A	W	3–0	Clarke, Kuhl, O'Regan og	3,794
Fourth round	4 November 1986	Charlton Athletic	A	L	2–3	Geddis, Shirtliff og	821

== Appearances and goals ==
Numbers in parentheses denote appearances made as a substitute.
Players with name in italics and marked * were on loan from another club for the whole of their season with Birmingham.
Players marked † left the club during the playing season.
Key to positions: GK – Goalkeeper; DF – Defender; MF – Midfielder; FW – Forward

Players' appearances and goals by competition
Pos.	Nat.	Name	League		FA Cup		League Cup		Full Members' Cup		Total	
Pos.	Nat.	Name	Apps	Goals	Apps	Goals	Apps	Goals	Apps	Goals	Apps	Goals
GK	ENG	Roger Hansbury	31	0	2	0	3	0	2	0	38	0
GK	ENG	Paul Tomlinson *	11	0	0	0	0	0	0	0	11	0
DF	ENG	Kevin Ashley	7	0	0	0	0	0	0	0	7	0
DF	ENG	Adrian Bird	6	0	0	0	0	0	0	0	6	0
DF	ENG	Julian Dicks	33 (1)	0	1	0	2	0	2	0	38 (1)	0
DF	NIR	Jim Hagan	12	0	0	0	3	0	1 (1)	0	16 (1)	0
DF	ENG	Paul Hart	1	0	0	0	0	0	0	0	1	0
DF	ENG	Mark Jones †	5	0	0	0	0	0	1	0	6	0
DF	ENG	Vince Overson	34	0	1	0	3	0	2	0	40	0
DF	ENG	Ray Ranson	16 (1)	0	2	0	2	0	1	0	21 (1)	0
DF	ENG	Brian Roberts	23 (1)	0	2	0	1	0	0	0	26 (1)	0
DF	SCO	Tommy Williams	29	0	2	0	2	0	0 (1)	0	33 (1)	0
MF	SCO	Des Bremner	40	4	3	0	3	0	2	0	47	4
MF	ENG	Richard Cooke *	5	0	0	0	0	0	1	0	6	0
MF	ENG	John Frain	2 (1)	1	0	0	0	0	0	0	2 (1)	1
MF	ENG	Ian Handysides	19 (1)	0	2	0	0	0	0	0	21 (1)	0
MF	ENG	Robert Hopkins †	3	0	0	0	0	0	0	0	3	0
MF	ENG	Martin Kuhl †	23	1	2	0	3	0	1 (1)	1	29 (1)	2
MF	ENG	Steve Lynex *	10	2	0	0	0	0	1	0	11	2
MF	ENG	Dennis Mortimer	33	4	2	1	1	1	1	0	37	6
MF	ENG	Dean Peer	1 (1)	0	0	0	0	0	0	0	1 (1)	0
MF	IRL	Martin Russell *	3 (2)	0	0	0	0	0	1	0	4 (2)	0
MF	ENG	Stuart Storer †	3 (3)	0	0	0	1	0	0	0	4 (3)	0
MF	ENG	Steve Wigley	11	1	0	0	0	0	0	0	11	1
FW	ENG	Wayne Clarke †	24	16	1	0	3	2	2	1	30	19
FW	ENG	David Geddis †	2	0	0	0	0 (2)	0	1	1	3 (2)	1
FW	SCO	Andy Kennedy	5 (4)	1	0	0	2	0	0	0	7 (4)	1
FW	ENG	Marc North *	4 (1)	1	0	0	0	0	0	0	4 (1)	1
FW	WAL	Tony Rees	27 (3)	4	2	0	1	0	1 (1)	0	31 (4)	4
FW	ENG	Steve Whitton	39	9	2	0	3	2	2	0	46	11

== See also ==
- Birmingham City F.C. seasons

== Sources ==
- Matthews, Tony (1995). Birmingham City: A Complete Record. Derby: Breedon Books. ISBN 978-1-85983-010-9.
- Matthews, Tony (2010). Birmingham City: The Complete Record. Derby: DB Publishing. ISBN 978-1-85983-853-2.
- For match dates, league positions and results: "Birmingham City 1986–1987: Results". Statto Organisation. Archived from the original on 4 March 2016.
- For lineups, appearances, goalscorers and attendances: Matthews (2010), Complete Record, pp. 408–09, 419.
