= 1984–85 Birmingham City F.C. season =

Birmingham City F.C.
1984–85 season
- Chairman: Keith Coombs
- Manager: Ron Saunders
- Ground: St Andrew's
- Football League Second Division: 2nd (promoted)
- FA Cup: Third round (eliminated by Norwich City)
- League Cup: Third round (eliminated by West Bromwich Albion)
- Top goalscorer: League: Wayne Clarke (17); All: Wayne Clarke (19)
- Highest home attendance: 24,871 vs Leeds United, 11 May 1985
- Lowest home attendance: 7,964 vs Plymouth Argyle, League Cup 2nd round, 25 September 1984
- Average home league attendance: 12,522
Home colours

The 1984–85 Football League season was Birmingham City Football Club's 82nd in the Football League and their 33rd in the Second Division, to which they were relegated in 1983–84. They finished in second position in the 22-team division, so were promoted back to the First Division after only one season. They entered the 1984–85 FA Cup in the third round proper, and lost to Norwich City in that round after three replays. They were eliminated from the League Cup by West Bromwich Albion in the third round after a replay.

Wayne Clarke was the club's top scorer, with 19 goals in all competitions, of which 17 were scored in the league.

The last home game of the season, a 1–0 win against Leeds United in front of a season-high crowd of nearly 25,000 that confirmed promotion back to the top flight, was marred by rioting in which 500 people were injured and a 15-year-old boy died when a wall collapsed. The match took place on the same day as the Bradford City stadium fire, and both formed part of the remit of Mr Justice Popplewell's inquiry into safety at sports grounds. According to his report, the events at St Andrew's "more clearly resembled the Battle of Agincourt than a football match".

== Football League First Division ==
Date	League position	Opponents	Venue	Result	Score F–A	Scorers	Attendance
25 August 1984	6th	Oldham Athletic	A	W	1–0	Clements og	5,307
1 September 1984	4th	Wimbledon	H	W	4–2	Clarke 2, Ferguson, Hopkins	10,445
4 September 1984	2nd	Fulham	A	W	1–0	Clarke	6,031
8 September 1984	2nd	Crystal Palace	A	W	2–0	Clarke, Hopkins	6,523
15 September 1984	1st	Carlisle United	H	W	2–0	Clarke, Harford	11,740
18 September 1984	1st	Portsmouth	H	L	0–1		18,046
22 September 1984	1st	Wolverhampton Wanderers	A	W	2–0	Hopkins, Kuhl	16,698
29 September 1984	1st	Huddersfield Town	H	W	1–0	Hopkins	11,480
6 October 1984	1st	Brighton & Hove Albion	A	L	0–2		13,695
13 October 1984	4th	Blackburn Rovers	H	L	0–2		12,758
20 October 1984	4th	Notts County	A	W	3–1	Clarke 2, Harford	5,788
27 October 1984	2nd	Oxford United	H	D	0–0		20,421
3 November 1984	3rd	Shrewsbury Town	H	D	0–0		9,807
10 November 1984	4th	Manchester City	A	L	0–1		25,369
17 November 1984	6th	Charlton Athletic	A	L	1–2	Morley	4,850
24 November 1984	5th	Barnsley	H	D	0–0		9,505
1 December 1984	5th	Cardiff City	A	W	2–1	Morley 2	5,057
8 December 1984	5th	Middlesbrough	H	W	3–2	Saxby og, Rees, Wright pen	8,004
15 December 1984	4th	Leeds United	A	W	1–0	Clarke	15,859
22 December 1984	3rd	Wimbledon	A	W	2–1	Geddis 2	3,674
26 December 1984	2nd	Grimsby Town	H	W	2–1	Geddis, Platnauer	14,180
29 December 1984	3rd	Fulham	H	D	2–2	Clarke, Hopkins	11,833
1 January 1985	3rd	Sheffield United	A	W	4–3	Hopkins, Geddis, Clarke, West og	16,571
2 February 1985	4th	Huddersfield Town	A	W	1–0	Geddis	7,460
23 February 1985	4th	Shrewsbury Town	A	L	0–1		7,177
2 March 1985	3rd	Oxford United	A	W	3–0	Clarke 2, Geddis	11,584
5 March 1985	3rd	Oldham Athletic	H	L	0–1		10,489
9 March 1985	2nd	Notts County	H	W	2–1	Clarke, Hopkins	9,071
12 March 1985	2nd	Carlisle United	A	L	1–2	Clarke	4,099
16 March 1985	5th	Blackburn Rovers	A	L	1–2	Rees	10,595
19 March 1985	4th	Manchester City	H	D	0–0		18,004
23 March 1985	4th	Brighton & Hove Albion	H	D	1–1	Hopkins	8,986
30 March 1985	3rd	Wolverhampton Wanderers	H	W	1–0	Geddis	10,236
5 April 1985	4th	Grimsby Town	A	L	0–1		6,939
8 April 1985	4th	Sheffield United	H	W	4–1	Clarke 2, Daly, Kennedy	10,235
13 April 1985	2nd	Portsmouth	A	W	3–1	Geddis 3	23,983
16 April 1985	2nd	Crystal Palace	H	W	3–0	Clarke, Geddis, Kennedy	10,727
20 April 1985	2nd	Charlton Athletic	H	W	2–1	Kennedy, Wright pen	10,697
27 April 1985	2nd	Barnsley	A	W	1–0	Geddis	6,757
4 May 1985	2nd	Cardiff City	H	W	2–0	Hopkins, Kennedy	15,868
6 May 1985	2nd	Middlesbrough	A	D	0–0		7,840
11 May 1985	2nd	Leeds United	H	W	1–0	Kuhl	24,871

=== League table (part) ===
Final Second Division table (part)
Pos	Team	Pld	W	D	L	GF	GA	GD	Pts
1st	Oxford United	42	25	9	8	84	36	+48	84
2nd	Birmingham City	42	25	7	10	59	33	+26	82
3rd	Manchester City	42	21	11	10	66	40	+26	74
4th	Portsmouth	42	20	14	8	69	50	+19	74
5th	Blackburn Rovers	42	21	10	11	66	41	+25	73

=== Results summary ===
Overall								Home						Away					
Pld	W	D	L	GF	GA	GD	Pts	W	D	L	GF	GA	GD	W	D	L	GF	GA	GD
42	25	7	10	59	33	+26	82	12	6	3	30	15	+15	13	1	7	29	18	+11

== FA Cup ==
Round	Date	Opponents	Venue	Result	Score F–A	Scorers	Attendance
Third round	5 January 1985	Norwich City	H	D	0–0		12,941
Third round replay	23 January 1985	Norwich City	A	D	1–1 aet	Wright	11,883
Third round 2nd replay	26 January 1985	Norwich City	H	D	1–1 aet	Geddis	11,755
Third round 3rd replay	28 January 1985	Norwich City	A	L	0–1		12,396

== League Cup ==
Round	Date	Opponents	Venue	Result	Score F–A	Scorers	Attendance
Second round 1st leg	25 September 1984	Plymouth Argyle	H	W	4–1	Clarke, Hopkins, Harford, Rees	7,964
Second round 2nd leg	9 October 1984	Plymouth Argyle	A	W	1–0	Clarke	4,650
Third round	30 October 1984	West Bromwich Albion	H	D	0–0		17,616
Third round replay	7 November 1984	West Bromwich Albion	A	L	1–3	Shearer	16,717

== Appearances and goals ==
Numbers in parentheses denote appearances made as a substitute.
Players with name in italics and marked * were on loan from another club for the whole of their season with Birmingham.
Players marked † left the club during the playing season.
Key to positions: GK – Goalkeeper; DF – Defender; MF – Midfielder; FW – Forward

Players' appearances and goals by competition
Pos.	Nat.	Name	League		FA Cup		League Cup		Total	
Pos.	Nat.	Name	Apps	Goals	Apps	Goals	Apps	Goals	Apps	Goals
GK	ENG	Tony Coton †	7	0	0	0	0	0	7	0
GK	IRL	Jim McDonagh *	1	0	0	0	0	0	1	0
GK	ENG	Mark Prudhoe	1	0	0	0	4	0	5	0
GK	ENG	David Seaman	33	0	4	0	0	0	37	0
DF	SCO	Ken Armstrong	36	0	3	0	4	0	43	0
DF	NIR	Jim Hagan	21 (8)	0	1 (2)	0	4	0	26 (10)	0
DF	ENG	Ray Ranson	28	0	4	0	0	0	32	0
DF	ENG	Brian Roberts	41	0	4	0	4	0	49	0
DF	WAL	Pat Van Den Hauwe †	6	0	0	0	0	0	6	0
DF	ENG	Billy Wright	42	2	4	1	4	0	50	3
MF	SCO	Des Bremner	30	0	4	0	3	0	37	0
MF	IRL	Gerry Daly	29 (1)	1	4	0	2	0	35 (1)	1
MF	ENG	Paul Gorman †	6	0	0	0	1	0	7	0
MF	ENG	Mick Halsall †	2 (1)	0	0	0	2	0	4 (1)	0
MF	ENG	Robert Hopkins	39	9	4	0	2	1	45	10
MF	ENG	Mark Jones	9 (1)	0	0	0	1 (1)	0	10 (2)	0
MF	ENG	Martin Kuhl	25 (2)	2	0	0	4	0	31 (2)	2
MF	ENG	Tony Morley *	4	3	0	0	0	0	4	3
MF	ENG	Nick Platnauer	11	1	4	0	0	0	15	1
MF	WAL	Byron Stevenson	6	0	0	0	0	0	6	0
MF	ENG	Stuart Storer	0	0	0	0	1	0	1	0
FW	ENG	Ian Brown	0	0	0	0	0 (1)	0	0 (1)	0
FW	ENG	Wayne Clarke	40	17	4	0	3	2	47	19
FW	ENG	Mick Ferguson †	2	1	0	0	0	0	2	1
FW	ENG	David Geddis	18	12	0	0	4	1	22	13
FW	ENG	Mick Harford †	12	2	0	0	3	1	15	3
FW	SCO	Andy Kennedy	4 (3)	4	0	0	0	0	4 (3)	4
FW	ENG	John Linford *	1 (1)	0	0	0	0	0	1 (1)	0
FW	WAL	Tony Rees	5 (4)	2	0	0	1 (1)	1	6 (5)	3
FW	ENG	Guy Russell	1	0	0	0	0	0	1	0
FW	ENG	Peter Shearer	2 (2)	0	0	0	1	1	3 (2)	1

== See also ==
- Birmingham City F.C. seasons

== Sources ==
- Matthews, Tony (1995). Birmingham City: A Complete Record. Derby: Breedon Books. ISBN 978-1-85983-010-9.
- Matthews, Tony (2010). Birmingham City: The Complete Record. Derby: DB Publishing. ISBN 978-1-85983-853-2.
- For match dates, league positions and results: "Birmingham City 1984–1985: Results". Statto Organisation. Archived from the original on 6 September 2015.
- For lineups, appearances, goalscorers and attendances: Matthews (2010), Complete Record, pp. 404–05.
