= 1987–88 Birmingham City F.C. season =

Birmingham City F.C.
1987–88 season
- Chairman: Ken Wheldon
- Manager: Garry Pendrey
- Ground: St Andrew's
- Football League Second Division: 19th
- FA Cup: Fifth round (eliminated by Nottingham Forest)
- League Cup: First round (eliminated by Mansfield Town)
- Full Members' Cup: First round (eliminated by Derby County)
- Top goalscorer: League: Steve Whitton (14); All: Steve Whitton (16)
- Highest home attendance: 34,494 vs Nottingham Forest, FA Cup 5th round, 20 February 1988
- Lowest home attendance: 5,878 vs Millwall, 9 February 1988
- Average home league attendance: 8,576
Home colours

The 1987–88 Football League season was Birmingham City Football Club's 85th in the Football League and their 35th in the Second Division. They finished in 19th position in the division, expanded for this season to 23 teams as part of a restructuring process, and again avoided relegation only by two points. They entered the 1987–88 FA Cup in the third round proper and lost in the fifth round to Nottingham Forest, and were beaten by Mansfield Town over two legs in the first round of the League Cup and by Derby County in the first round of the Full Members' Cup.

== Football League Second Division ==
The league programme did not end on the same day for all clubs. Although Birmingham were in 18th place after their last match, on 6 May, the last Second Division fixture was played the following day, when they were overtaken by Shrewsbury Town, so finished 19th.

| Date | League position | Opponents | Venue | Result | Score F–A | Scorers | Attendance |
|---|---|---|---|---|---|---|---|
| 15 August 1987 | 1st | Stoke City | H | W | 2–0 | Rees 2 | 13,137 |
| 22 August 1987 | 1st | Aston Villa | A | W | 2–0 | Handysides, Rees | 30,870 |
| 29 August 1987 | 3rd | AFC Bournemouth | H | D | 1–1 | Kennedy | 8,284 |
| 1 September 1987 | 5th | Millwall | A | L | 1–3 | Rees | 6,758 |
| 5 September 1987 | 14th | Crystal Palace | H | L | 0–6 | | 7,011 |
| 12 September 1987 | 10th | Swindon Town | A | W | 2–0 | Handysides, Whitton | 9,128 |
| 15 September 1987 | 6th | Blackburn Rovers | H | W | 1–0 | Whitton | 6,032 |
| 19 September 1987 | 5th | Shrewsbury Town | H | D | 0–0 | | 7,183 |
| 26 September 1987 | 8th | Plymouth Argyle | A | D | 1–1 | McElhinney og | 8,912 |
| 30 September 1987 | 8th | West Bromwich Albion | A | L | 1–2 | Kennedy | 15,399 |
| 3 October 1987 | 7th | Huddersfield Town | H | W | 2–0 | Whitton 2 | 6,282 |
| 10 October 1987 | 8th | Reading | H | D | 2–1 | Whitton, Kennedy | 6,147 |
| 17 October 1987 | 9th | Bradford City | A | L | 0–4 | | 12,256 |
| 20 October 1987 | 7th | Sheffield United | A | W | 2–0 | Withe 2 | 9,287 |
| 24 October 1987 | 9th | Middlesbrough | H | D | 0–0 | | 7,404 |
| 31 October 1987 | 6th | Oldham Athletic | A | W | 2–1 | Frain, Whitton pen | 5,486 |
| 3 November 1987 | 6th | Barnsley | H | W | 2–0 | Whitton 2 | 6,622 |
| 7 November 1987 | 7th | Hull City | A | L | 0–2 | | 7,901 |
| 14 November 1987 | 8th | Leicester City | H | D | 2–2 | Whitton 2 | 8,666 |
| 21 November 1987 | 10th | Manchester City | A | L | 0–3 | | 22,690 |
| 28 November 1987 | 9th | Ipswich Town | H | W | 1–0 | Frain | 6,718 |
| 5 December 1987 | 10th | Leeds United | A | L | 1–4 | Kennedy | 15,987 |
| 12 December 1987 | 10th | Aston Villa | H | L | 1–2 | Kennedy | 27,789 |
| 19 December 1987 | 12th | Blackburn Rovers | A | L | 0–2 | | 8,542 |
| 26 December 1987 | 15th | Plymouth Argyle | H | L | 0–1 | | 9,166 |
| 28 December 1987 | 14th | Shrewsbury Town | A | D | 0–0 | | 6,367 |
| 1 January 1988 | 14th | AFC Bournemouth | A | L | 2–4 | Dicks, Wigley | 7,963 |
| 2 January 1988 | 15th | Swindon Town | H | D | 1–1 | Childs | 7,829 |
| 16 January 1988 | 15th | Stoke City | A | L | 1–3 | Kennedy | 10,076 |
| 6 February 1988 | 16th | Crystal Palace | A | L | 0–3 | | 8,809 |
| 9 February 1988 | 16th | Millwall | H | W | 1–0 | Whitton | 5,878 |
| 27 February 1988 | 16th | Huddersfield Town | A | D | 2–2 | Robinson, Whitton | 5,441 |
| 5 March 1988 | 17th | Bradford City | H | D | 1–1 | Whitton | 8,101 |
| 8 March 1988 | 17th | West Bromwich Albion | H | L | 0–1 | | 12,331 |
| 12 March 1988 | 17th | Reading | A | D | 1–1 | Handysides | 6,598 |
| 19 March 1988 | 17th | Oldham Athletic | H | L | 1–3 | Wigley | 6,012 |
| 26 March 1988 | 17th | Middlesbrough | A | D | 1–1 | Atkins | 15,465 |
| 2 April 1988 | 17th | Hull City | H | D | 1–1 | Williams | 7,059 |
| 5 April 1988 | 18th | Leicester City | A | L | 0–2 | | 13,541 |
| 9 April 1988 | 17th | Sheffield United | H | W | 1–0 | Kennedy | 7,046 |
| 23 April 1988 | 17th | Barnsley | A | D | 2–2 | Whitton pen, Jeffels og | 4,949 |
| 30 April 1988 | 17th | Manchester City | H | L | 0–3 | | 8,014 |
| 2 May 1988 | 18th | Ipswich Town | A | L | 0–1 | | 11,127 |
| 6 May 1988 | 18th | Leeds United | H | D | 0–0 | | 6,024 |

=== League table (part) ===
Final Second Division table (part)
| Pos | Team | Pld | W | D | L | GF | GA | GD | Pts |
|---|---|---|---|---|---|---|---|---|---|
| 17th | AFC Bournemouth | 44 | 13 | 10 | 21 | 56 | 68 | −12 | 49 |
| 18th | Shrewsbury Town | 44 | 11 | 16 | 17 | 42 | 54 | −12 | 49 |
| 19th | Birmingham City | 44 | 11 | 15 | 18 | 41 | 66 | −25 | 48 |
| 20th | West Bromwich Albion | 44 | 12 | 11 | 21 | 50 | 69 | −19 | 47 |
| 21st | Sheffield United | 44 | 13 | 7 | 24 | 45 | 74 | −29 | 46 |

=== Results summary ===
| Overall | | | | | | | | Home | | | | | | Away | | | | | |
| Pld | W | D | L | GF | GA | GD | Pts | W | D | L | GF | GA | GD | W | D | L | GF | GA | GD |
|---|---|---|---|---|---|---|---|---|---|---|---|---|---|---|---|---|---|---|---|
| 44 | 11 | 15 | 18 | 41 | 66 | −25 | 48 | 7 | 9 | 6 | 20 | 24 | −4 | 4 | 6 | 12 | 21 | 42 | −21 |

== FA Cup ==
| Round | Date | Opponents | Venue | Result | Score F–A | Scorers | Attendance |
|---|---|---|---|---|---|---|---|
| Third round | 9 January 1988 | Gillingham | A | W | 3–0 | Greenall og, Williams, Handysides | 9,267 |
| Fourth round | 30 January 1988 | Barnsley | A | W | 2–0 | Rees, Wigley | 13,219 |
| Fifth round | 20 February 1988 | Nottingham Forest | H | L | 0–1 | | 34,494 |

== League Cup ==
| Round | Date | Opponents | Venue | Result | Score F–A | Scorers | Attendance |
|---|---|---|---|---|---|---|---|
| First round 1st leg | 18 August 1987 | Mansfield Town | A | D | 2–2 | Whitton, Handysides | 4,425 |
| First round 2nd leg | 25 August 1987 | Mansfield Town | H | L | 0–1 | | 6,054 |

== Full Members' Cup ==
| Round | Date | Opponents | Venue | Result | Score F–A | Scorers | Attendance |
|---|---|---|---|---|---|---|---|
| First round | 25 November 1987 | Derby County | A | L | 1–3 | Whitton | 8,277 |

== Appearances and goals ==
Numbers in parentheses denote appearances made as a substitute.
Players with name in italics and marked * were on loan from another club for the whole of their season with Birmingham.
Players marked † left the club during the playing season.
Key to positions: GK – Goalkeeper; DF – Defender; MF – Midfielder; FW – Forward

Players' appearances and goals by competition
| Pos. | Nat. | Name | League | | FA Cup | | League Cup | | Full Members' Cup | | Total | |
| Pos. | Nat. | Name | Apps | Goals | Apps | Goals | Apps | Goals | Apps | Goals | Apps | Goals |
|---|---|---|---|---|---|---|---|---|---|---|---|---|
| GK | ENG | Roger Hansbury | 22 | 0 | 3 | 0 | 0 | 0 | 0 | 0 | 25 | 0 |
| GK | ENG | Tony Godden | 22 | 0 | 0 | 0 | 2 | 0 | 1 | 0 | 25 | 0 |
| DF | ENG | Kevin Ashley | 0 (1) | 0 | 0 | 0 | 0 | 0 | 0 (1) | 0 | 0 (2) | 0 |
| DF | ENG | Adrian Bird | 6 (3) | 0 | 0 | 0 | 1 | 0 | 1 | 0 | 8 (3) | 0 |
| DF | ENG | Julian Dicks † | 32 | 1 | 3 | 0 | 2 | 0 | 0 | 0 | 37 | 1 |
| DF | ENG | Vince Overson | 37 | 0 | 2 | 0 | 1 | 0 | 0 | 0 | 40 | 0 |
| DF | ENG | Ray Ranson | 38 | 0 | 3 | 0 | 0 | 0 | 1 | 0 | 42 | 0 |
| DF | ENG | Brian Roberts | 26 | 1 | 1 | 0 | 2 | 0 | 0 | 0 | 29 | 1 |
| DF | SCO | Tommy Williams | 33 | 1 | 3 | 1 | 2 | 0 | 1 | 0 | 39 | 2 |
| MF | ENG | Ian Atkins | 8 | 1 | 0 | 0 | 0 | 0 | 0 | 0 | 8 | 1 |
| MF | SCO | Des Bremner | 37 | 0 | 2 | 0 | 2 | 0 | 1 | 0 | 42 | 0 |
| MF | ENG | Gary Childs | 23 (9) | 1 | 3 | 0 | 0 (1) | 0 | 1 | 0 | 27 (10) | 1 |
| MF | ENG | John Frain | 12 (2) | 2 | 1 | 0 | 0 | 0 | 1 | 0 | 13 (2) | 2 |
| MF | ENG | Ian Handysides | 28 (2) | 3 | 3 | 1 | 2 | 1 | 0 | 0 | 33 (2) | 5 |
| MF | ENG | Kevin Langley | 7 | 0 | 0 | 0 | 0 | 0 | 0 | 0 | 7 | 0 |
| MF | ENG | Ronnie Morris | 0 (1) | 0 | 0 | 0 | 0 | 0 | 0 | 0 | 0 (1) | 0 |
| MF | ENG | Paul Tait | 0 (1) | 0 | 0 | 0 | 0 | 0 | 0 | 0 | 0 (1) | 0 |
| MF | ENG | John Trewick | 25 (1) | 0 | 1 (1) | 0 | 0 | 0 | 1 | 0 | 28 (2) | 0 |
| MF | ENG | Steve Wigley | 43 | 2 | 3 | 1 | 2 | 0 | 1 | 0 | 49 | 3 |
| MF | ENG | Mark Yates | 1 (2) | 0 | 0 | 0 | 0 | 0 | 0 | 0 | 1 (2) | 0 |
| FW | SCO | Andy Kennedy | 15 (13) | 7 | 1 | 0 | 2 | 0 | 1 | 0 | 19 (13) | 7 |
| FW | WAL | Tony Rees † | 17 (6) | 4 | 2 | 1 | 2 | 0 | 0 (1) | 0 | 21 (7) | 5 |
| FW | ENG | Colin Robinson | 3 (1) | 1 | 0 | 0 | 0 | 0 | 0 | 0 | 3 (1) | 1 |
| FW | ENG | Guy Russell | 6 (3) | 0 | 0 | 0 | 0 | 0 | 0 | 0 | 6 (3) | 0 |
| FW | ENG | Neil Sproston | 0 (1) | 0 | 0 | 0 | 0 | 0 | 0 | 0 | 0 (1) | 0 |
| FW | ENG | Phil Starbuck | 3 | 0 | 0 | 0 | 0 | 0 | 0 | 0 | 3 | 0 |
| FW | ENG | Steve Whitton | 32 (1) | 14 | 2 | 0 | 2 | 1 | 1 | 1 | 37 (1) | 16 |
| FW | ENG | Peter Withe * | 8 | 2 | 0 | 0 | 0 | 0 | 0 | 0 | 8 | 2 |

== See also ==
- Birmingham City F.C. seasons

== Sources ==
- Matthews, Tony (1995). Birmingham City: A Complete Record. Derby: Breedon Books. ISBN 978-1-85983-010-9.
- Matthews, Tony (2010). Birmingham City: The Complete Record. Derby: DB Publishing. ISBN 978-1-85983-853-2.
- For match dates, league positions and results: "Birmingham City 1987–1988: Results". Statto Organisation. Archived from the original on 4 March 2016.
- For line-ups, appearances, goalscorers and attendances: Matthews (2010), Complete Record, pp. 410–11, 480.
