= 1982–83 Birmingham City F.C. season =

Birmingham City F.C.
1982–83 season
- Chairman: Keith Coombs
- Manager: Ron Saunders
- Ground: St Andrew's
- Football League First Division: 17th
- FA Cup: Fourth round (eliminated by Crystal Palace)
- League Cup: Fourth round (eliminated by Burnley)
- Top goalscorer: League: Mick Ferguson (8); All: Mick Ferguson (8)
- Highest home attendance: 43,864 vs Aston Villa, 27 December 1982
- Lowest home attendance: 7,861 vs Shrewsbury Town, League Cup 2nd round, 26 October 1982
- Average home league attendance: 15,880
Home colours

The 1982–83 Football League season was Birmingham City Football Club's 80th in the Football League and their 48th in the First Division. After five wins and a draw from the last six league games, and needing to win their last game, away at Southampton, to ensure safety, they finished in 17th position in the 22-team division. They entered the 1982–83 FA Cup in the third round proper and lost to Crystal Palace in the fourth, and were eliminated by Burnley in the fourth round of the League Cup.

Thirty players appeared in at least one first-team game, and Noel Blake made most appearances, with 44 of the possible 49. There were 19 different goalscorers; Mick Ferguson was the club's leading scorer with eight goals, all scored in the league.

== Football League First Division ==
Date	League position	Opponents	Venue	Result	Score F–A	Scorers	Attendance
28 August 1982	22nd	Manchester United	A	L	0–3		48,673
31 August 1982	19th	Liverpool	H	D	0–0		20,976
4 September 1982	20th	Stoke City	H	L	1–4	Curbishley	14,392
8 September 1982	22nd	Norwich City	A	L	1–5	Broadhurst	13,007
11 September 1982	22nd	West Ham United	A	L	0–5		18,754
18 September 1982	21st	Coventry City	H	W	1–0	Evans	11,681
25 September 1982	21st	Brighton & Hove Albion	A	L	0–1		9,846
2 October 1982	22nd	Watford	H	D	1–1	Summerfield	13,870
9 October 1982	22nd	Luton Town	H	L	2–3	Langan pen, Brazier	13,772
16 October 1982	22nd	Nottingham Forest	A	D	1–1	Bremner	14,528
23 October 1982	22nd	Ipswich Town	H	D	0–0		12,051
30 October 1982	22nd	Arsenal	A	D	0–0		20,699
6 November 1982	22nd	West Bromwich Albion	H	W	2–1	Dillon pen, Blake	18,520
13 November 1982	21st	Notts County	A	D	0–0		9,118
20 November 1982	22nd	Manchester City	A	D	0–0		23,174
27 November 1982	20th	Sunderland	H	W	2–1	Ferguson, Evans	12,375
4 December 1982	21st	Everton	A	D	0–0		13,702
11 December 1982	22nd	Southampton	H	L	0–2		11,199
18 December 1982	21st	Tottenham Hotspur	A	L	1–2	Langan	20,946
27 December 1982	21st	Aston Villa	H	W	3–0	Blake, Handysides, Ferguson	43,864
29 December 1982	21st	Swansea City	A	D	0–0		11,840
1 January 1983	21st	Manchester City	H	D	2–2	Ferguson 2	16,362
3 January 1983	22nd	Stoke City	A	D	1–1	Phillips	15,416
15 January 1983	22nd	Manchester United	H	L	1–2	Dillon pen	19,333
22 January 1983	22nd	Liverpool	A	L	0–1		30,986
5 February 1983	20th	West Ham United	H	W	3–0	Harford, Ferguson, Gayle	12,539
26 February 1983	20th	Nottingham Forest	H	D	1–1	Harford	12,987
5 March 1983	22nd	Ipswich Town	A	L	1–3	Dennis	16,450
15 March 1983	20th	Arsenal	H	W	2–1	Van Den Hauwe, Dillon	11,276
19 March 1983	21st	West Bromwich Albion	A	L	0–2		20,682
22 March 1983	21st	Watford	A	L	1–2	Ferguson	14,229
26 March 1983	20th	Notts County	H	W	3–0	Ferguson 2 (1 pen), Harford	11,744
2 April 1983	20th	Swansea City	H	D	1–1	Stevenson pen	13,591
4 April 1983	20th	Aston Villa	A	L	0–1		40,897
9 April 1983	22nd	Norwich City	H	L	0–4		11,733
12 April 1983	22nd	Luton Town	A	L	1–3	Hopkins	12,868
16 April 1983	21st	Coventry City	A	W	1–0	Phillips	10,221
23 April 1983	20th	Everton	H	W	1–0	Hopkins	11,045
30 April 1983	20th	Sunderland	A	W	2–1	Blake pen, Harford	14,818
2 May 1983	19th	Brighton & Hove Albion	H	D	1–1	Handysides	15,136
7 May 1983	18th	Tottenham Hotspur	H	W	2–0	Halsall,Harford	18,947
14 May 1983	17th	Southampton	A	W	1–0	Harford	20,327

=== League table (part) ===
Final First Division table (part)
Pos	Team	Pld	W	D	L	GF	GA	GD	Pts
15th	Notts County	42	15	7	20	55	71	−16	52
16th	Sunderland	42	12	14	16	48	61	−13	50
17th	Birmingham City	42	12	14	16	40	55	−15	50
18th	Luton Town	42	12	13	17	65	84	−19	49
19th	Coventry City	42	13	9	20	48	59	−11	48

=== Results summary ===
Overall								Home						Away					
Pld	W	D	L	GF	GA	GD	Pts	W	D	L	GF	GA	GD	W	D	L	GF	GA	GD
42	12	14	16	40	55	−15	50	9	7	5	29	24	+5	3	7	11	11	31	−20

== FA Cup ==
Round	Date	Opponents	Venue	Result	Score F–A	Scorers	Attendance
Third round	8 January 1983	Walsall	A	D	0–0		12,697
Third round replay	11 January 1983	Walsall	H	W	1–0 aet	Summerfield	14,774
Fourth round	29 January 1983	Crystal Palace	A	L	0–1		12,327

== League Cup ==
Round	Date	Opponents	Venue	Result	Score F–A	Scorers	Attendance
Second round 1st leg	5 October 1982	Shrewsbury Town	A	D	1–1	Handysides	5,003
Second round 2nd leg	26 October 1982	Shrewsbury Town	H	W	4–1	Evans, Curbishley 2, Dillon	7,861
Third round	9 November 1982	Derby County	H	W	3–1	Handysides, Dillon pen, Curbishley	12,475
Fourth round	30 November 1982	Burnley	A	L	2–3	Evans, Handysides	10,405

== Appearances and goals ==
Numbers in parentheses denote appearances made as a substitute.
Players with name in italics and marked * were on loan from another club for the whole of their season with Birmingham.
Players marked † left the club during the playing season.
Key to positions: GK – Goalkeeper; DF – Defender; MF – Midfielder; FW – Forward

Players' appearances and goals by competition
Pos.	Nat.	Name	League		FA Cup		League Cup		Total	
Pos.	Nat.	Name	Apps	Goals	Apps	Goals	Apps	Goals	Apps	Goals
GK	SCO	Jim Blyth	14	0	0	0	2	0	16	0
GK	ENG	Tony Coton	28	0	3	0	2	0	33	0
DF	ENG	Noel Blake	37	3	3	0	4	0	44	3
DF	ENG	Kevan Broadhurst	28 (1)	1	3	0	4	0	35 (1)	1
DF	ENG	Mark Dennis	23	1	3	0	0	0	26	1
DF	NIR	Jim Hagan	30 (2)	0	3	0	2	0	35 (2)	0
DF	ENG	Phil Hawker †	4	0	0	0	0	0	4	0
DF	IRL	Dave Langan	14	2	0	0	1	0	15	2
DF	ENG	Wayne Mumford	2	0	0	0	1	0	3	0
DF	ENG	Geoff Scott †	4	0	0	0	0	0	4	0
DF	WAL	Pat Van Den Hauwe	30 (1)	1	0	0	3	0	33 (1)	1
MF	ENG	Frank Carrodus	7 (1)	0	0	0	0 (1)	0	7 (2)	0
MF	ENG	Alan Curbishley †	30	1	3	0	4	3	37	4
MF	ENG	Kevin Dillon †	27	3	3	0	4	2	34	5
MF	ENG	Mick Halsall	12	1	0	0	0	0	12	1
MF	ENG	Ian Handysides	26 (3)	2	2 (1)	0	4	3	32 (3)	5
MF	ENG	Robert Hopkins	11	2	0	0	0	0	11	2
MF	ENG	Martin Kuhl	1	0	0	0	0	0	1	0
MF	NED	Toine van Mierlo †	4	0	0	0	0	0	4	0
MF	ENG	Les Phillips	11 (2)	2	1	0	0 (1)	0	12 (3)	2
MF	WAL	Byron Stevenson	30 (1)	1	2	0	4	0	36 (1)	1
MF	ENG	Kevin Summerfield †	2 (3)	1	1 (1)	1	1	0	3 (4)	2
FW	ENG	Colin Brazier †	10 (1)	1	2 (1)	0	4	0	16 (2)	1
FW	SCO	Kevin Bremner *	3 (1)	1	0	0	0	0	3 (1)	1
FW	ENG	Tony Evans	7	2	0	0	2	2	9	4
FW	ENG	Mick Ferguson *	20	8	1	0	2	0	23	8
FW	ENG	Carl Francis	2 (3)	0	0	0	0	0	2 (3)	0
FW	ENG	Howard Gayle	13	1	1	0	0	0	14	1
FW	ENG	Mick Harford	29	6	2	0	0	0	31	6
FW	ENG	Neil Whatmore †	2	0	0	0	0	0	2	0

== See also ==
- Birmingham City F.C. seasons

== Sources ==
- Matthews, Tony (1995). Birmingham City: A Complete Record. Derby: Breedon Books. ISBN 978-1-85983-010-9.
- Matthews, Tony (2010). Birmingham City: The Complete Record. Derby: DB Publishing. ISBN 978-1-85983-853-2.
- For match dates, league positions and results: "Birmingham City 1982–1983 : Results". Statto Organisation. Archived from the original on 4 January 2016.
- For lineups, appearances, goalscorers and attendances: Matthews (2010), Complete Record, pp. 400–01.
