= Neil Sproston =

English footballer

Personal information
- Full name: Neil Robert Sproston
- Date of birth: 20 November 1970 (age 55)
- Place of birth: Dudley, England
- Height: 6 ft 2 in (1.88 m)
- Position: Forward

Youth career
- 1986–1988: Birmingham City

Senior career*
Years	Team	Apps	(Gls)
1988–1990	Birmingham City	1	(0)
1990	Alvechurch		
1990–1991	Armitage 90		
1991–1992	Oldswinford		
1992–199?	Dudley Town		
–	Gornal Sports		
1993–1994	Lye Town		
- * Club domestic league appearances and goals

Neil Robert Sproston (born 20 November 1970) is an English former professional footballer who played in the Football League for Birmingham City.

Sproston was born in Dudley, West Midlands. When he left school in 1986, he joined Birmingham City as a YTS trainee, and turned professional two years later. With fellow forwards Tony Rees, Andy Kennedy and Steve Whitton unavailable, Sproston, still a trainee, was given a place on the substitutes' bench for the Second Division game at home to Middlesbrough on 24 October 1987, four weeks before his 17th birthday. He came into the game as the second substitute used, to replace John Trewick, and marked his debut by receiving a head wound which needed stitches. At the time he was the second-youngest player (behind Trevor Francis) to appear for Birmingham's first team. In the youth team Sproston was tried in a variety of positions, ending up playing in midfield, but never played for the first team again. Released at the end of the 1989–90 season, he went on to play for a number of non-league teams in the West Midlands area.
