= Ronnie Morris (footballer) =

English footballer

Personal information
- Full name: Ronald Morris
- Date of birth: 25 September 1970 (age 56)
- Place of birth: Birmingham, England
- Height: 6 ft 0 in (1.83 m)
- Position: Winger

Youth career
- 1984–1986: FA School of Excellence
- 1986–1988: Birmingham City

Senior career*
Years	Team	Apps	(Gls)
1988–1989	Birmingham City	11	(0)
1990–199?	Redditch United		
- * Club domestic league appearances and goals

Ronald Morris (born 25 September 1970) is an English former professional footballer who played in the Football League for Birmingham City. He played as a winger.

Morris was born in Birmingham. He began his football career as one of the first intake of boys to the Football Association's School of Excellence at Lilleshall which opened in 1984, from where he joined Birmingham City as a YTS trainee in 1986. He was capped for England schoolboys, and made his Birmingham debut in the Second Division on the last day of the 1987–88 season, coming on as substitute for Tommy Williams in a goalless draw at home to Leeds United. Morris turned professional in September 1988 and made 14 appearances in all competitions, mostly as a substitute, in the 1988–89 season, but the club cancelled his contract following incidents at the training ground. An attempt to revive his career in Italy foundered when he was discovered to have signed for his new club after the transfer deadline, and Morris returned to England and joined non-league club Redditch United.
