= Mark McCarrick =

English footballer (born 1962)

Personal information
- Full name: Mark Bernard McCarrick
- Date of birth: 4 February 1962 (age 64)
- Place of birth: Liverpool, England
- Position: Full back

Youth career
- West Bromwich Albion

Senior career*
| Years | Team | Apps | (Gls) |
- Caroline Hill (Hong Kong)
- Christchurch (New Zealand)
| 1982–1983 | Witton Albion | | |
| 1983–1984 | Birmingham City | 15 | (0) |
| 1984–1986 | Lincoln City | 44 | (0) |
| 1986 | Crewe Alexandra | 11 | (0) |
| 1986 | Koparit | 12 | (1) |
| 1986–1987 | Runcorn | | |
| 1987–1991 | Tranmere Rovers | 125 | (14) |
| 1991 | Altrincham | | |
| 1991 | Northwich Victoria | | |
| 1991 | Marine | | |
| 1991 | Winsford United | | |
| 1993 | Bangor City | 6 | (1) |
| 1993–1996 | Winsford United | | |
| 1996 | Middlewich Athletic | | |
| 1987 | Koparit | 2 | (0) |
- * Club domestic league appearances and goals

Mark Bernard McCarrick (born 4 February 1962) is an English former professional footballer who played nearly 200 games in the Football League representing Birmingham City, Lincoln City, Crewe Alexandra and Tranmere Rovers. He played as a full back.

== Career ==
McCarrick was born in Liverpool. When he left school in 1985 he joined West Bromwich Albion as an apprentice but never signed professional forms with the club. He played abroad before signing for Witton Albion in 1982, and turned professional with Birmingham City in May 1983. McCarrick made his debut for the club on 6 September 1983 as a substitute for Tony Rees in a 1–0 home win against Stoke City in the First Division. He played fairly regularly in the second half of the 1983–84 season, but his lack of pace was exposed by John Barnes in the FA Cup quarter final against Watford, and he was allowed to leave for Third Division club Lincoln City in July 1984 for a fee of £4,000. He played 53 games in all competitions for Lincoln, of which 44 came in the Third Division. In May 1985 he was a member of the Lincoln City team playing Bradford City at Valley Parade when a stand caught fire and 56 spectators were killed. From February 1986 he played for Crewe Alexandra on a non-contract basis, then in Finland with Koparit and in non-League football with Runcorn, before Tranmere Rovers took him back to the Football League for a fee of £5,000.

McCarrick was with Tranmere as they climbed from near the bottom of the Fourth Division to the top of the Third, winning the Football League Trophy in 1990 along the way, though he played in neither their losing playoff final nor the Football League Trophy final, and had left by the time they won promotion to the Second Division in 1991. Described by goalkeeper Eric Nixon as "one of those who could be relied upon to give his all", McCarrick was picked by both Nixon and radio journalist Peter McDowall at left back in their Tranmere select XIs.

In March 1991, McCarrick dropped back into non-league football in the Cheshire area with Altrincham, Northwich Victoria, Marine, Winsford United and Middlewich Athletic, interrupted by a spell running a bar in Spain and a foray into the League of Wales with Bangor City.

After retiring as a player, McCarrick ran a soccer school for children in Portugal.
