= Mark Kendall (footballer, born 1961) =

English footballer

Personal information
- Full name: Mark Ivan Kendall
- Date of birth: 10 December 1961 (age 64)
- Place of birth: Nuneaton, England
- Height: 6 ft 0 in (1.83 m)
- Position: Goalkeeper

Youth career
- 1976–1979: Aston Villa

Senior career*
Years	Team	Apps	(Gls)
1979–1982	Aston Villa	0	(0)
1982–1984	Northampton Town	11	(0)
1984–1985	Birmingham City	1	(0)
1985–19??	Tamworth		
–	Mile Oak Rovers		
–	Hitchin Town		
–	Worcester City		
–	Atherstone Town		
–	Bedworth United		
–	Willenhall Town		
–	Polesworth North Warwick		

International career
1979–1980	England Youth	7	(0)
1981	England U20	5	(0)
- * Club domestic league appearances and goals

Mark Ivan Kendall (born 10 December 1961) is an English former professional footballer who played in the Football League for Northampton Town and Birmingham City. He played as a goalkeeper.

== Career ==
Kendall was born in Nuneaton, Warwickshire, and attended Polesworth School. He joined Aston Villa in 1976. Kendall played in Aston Villa's youth teams which lost in the final of the 1978 FA Youth Cup final but were winners two years later. While with Aston Villa, Kendall was capped for England at youth level, and played 18 games for the reserves, but never appeared for the first team. He joined Fourth Division club Northampton Town on a free transfer in 1982.

He played 11 times in the Football League for Northampton, and moved on to Birmingham City of the First Division in March 1984 as cover for Tony Coton. He played once in the 1983–84 season, deputising for Coton in a game at home to Arsenal which resulted in a 1–1 draw. After leaving Birmingham Kendall joined Tamworth, where he contributed to the club's winning the West Midlands (Regional) League title in 1988. After Tamworth he went on play for a number of non-league teams, mostly in the Midlands area, including Mile Oak Rovers, Hitchin Town, Worcester City, Atherstone Town, Bedworth United, Willenhall and Polesworth North Warwick.

Kendall has coached the Tamworth Junior League XI, and has represented former club Birmingham City in Masters football.

== Honours ==
with Aston Villa

- FA Youth Cup winners: 1980
- FA Youth Cup runners-up: 1978

with Tamworth

- West Midlands (Regional) League champions: 1987–88
