= Nick Platnauer =

English footballer and manager

Personal information
- Full name: Nicholas Robert Platnauer
- Date of birth: 10 June 1961 (age 65)
- Place of birth: Leicester, England
- Height: 5 ft 10 in (1.78 m)
- Positions: Left-back; midfielder

Youth career
- 197?–1978: Northampton Town
- 1978–1979: Bedford Town

Senior career*
Years	Team	Apps	(Gls)
1979–1982	Bedford Town		
1982–1983	Bristol Rovers	24	(7)
1983–1984	Coventry City	44	(6)
1984–1986	Birmingham City	28	(2)
1986	→ Reading (loan)	7	(0)
1986–1989	Cardiff City	115	(6)
1989–1991	Notts County	57	(1)
1991	→ Port Vale (loan)	14	(0)
1991–1993	Leicester City	35	(0)
1993	Scunthorpe United	14	(2)
1993–1994	Mansfield Town	25	(0)
1994–1996	Lincoln City	27	(0)
1997–1998	Hinckley United		
Total		390	(24)

Managerial career
- 2000–2003: Rothwell Town
- 2003: Kettering Town (caretaker)
- 2004–2007: Bedford Town
- 2011–2013: Bedford Town
- * Club domestic league appearances and goals

Nicholas Robert Platnauer (born 10 June 1961) is an English former professional footballer and football manager. A left-back, he made 473 league and cup appearances in a 16-year professional career.

He moved from Bedford Town to Bristol Rovers in 1982 before being sold to Coventry City for a fee of £50,000 in August 1983. Voted Player of the Year in 1983–84, he moved on to Birmingham City in December 1984 and helped the club to win promotion out of the Second Division in 1984–85. Loaned out to Reading in 1985–86, he helped the club to the Third Division title. In September 1986, he joined Cardiff City and helped the Welsh club to win promotion out of the Fourth Division in 1987–88. In August 1989, he was sold to Notts County for a £50,000 fee and helped the "Magpies" to win promotion out of the Third Division via the play-offs in 1990. He joined Leicester City in July 1991, following a loan spell at Port Vale. He then saw his career in the Football League out in 1996 following short spells at Scunthorpe United, Mansfield Town and Lincoln City.

He played for non-League side Hinckley United before entering the non-League management circuit with Rothwell Town in 2000. Three years later, he spent some time as caretaker manager of Kettering Town before he was appointed manager of Bedford Town in January 2004. He helped the club to win promotion out of the Southern Football League via the play-offs in 2006 but resigned later that year following a poor run of results in the Conference South. He spent October 2007 to August 2011 as assistant manager at Hinckley United, before returning to Bedford Town as manager between 2011 and 2013.

== Playing career ==
Platnauer was born in Leicester but moved to Bedford as a youngster, where began his career with his local side Bedford Town after previously been a Northampton Town apprentice. He began the 1978–79 campaign in the youth team and would make his first-team debut at the end of the season. He scored 12 goals in 125 club appearances. He left his position at a bank to turn professional when he was signed by Bristol Rovers manager Bobby Gould in August 1982, who paid Bedford a transfer fee of £5,000. Having impressed in the 1982–83 season, with the "Gas" four places and seven points outside the Third Division promotion places, he followed Bobby Gould to the First Division with Coventry City for a fee of £35,000 in August 1983.

He played 53 games for the "Sky Blues", helping the Highfield Road club to finish two points above the relegation zone in 1983–84, and was voted as Player of the Year. He switched to Birmingham City in December 1984, after Don Mackay replaced Gould as the boss at Coventry. Having helped relegate the "Blues" the previous season, Platnauer then helped Ron Saunders to bring top-flight football back to St Andrew's with promotion out of the Second Division in 1984–85. Finding the competition for first-team places greater in the 1985–86 season, Platnauer joined Reading on loan in January 1986, after Saunders was sacked and replaced by John Bond. He made seven league appearances at Elm Park, as he helped Ian Branfoot's "Royals" to top the Third Division table.

He joined newly relegated Cardiff City in the Fourth Division on a free transfer in September 1986, thereby completing the set of all four levels of the Football League. After making his debut in a 1–1 draw with Halifax Town, he was a regular in the 1986–87 season. He also featured heavily in the 1987–88 promotion-winning season before helping Frank Burrows's "Bluebirds" to consolidate their third-tier status in 1988–89.

He left Ninian Park in August 1989, after he was picked up by Neil Warnock at league rivals Notts County for a £50,000 fee. The "Magpies" missed out on automatic promotion by four points in 1989–90, but he played at Wembley as County won promotion to the Second Division with a 2–0 victory over Tranmere Rovers in the play-off final. The county would achieve promotion from the play-offs for a second successive season in 1990–91, though Platnauer would play little part in it.a He was loaned out to league rivals Port Vale in January 1991. He played 15 games for the Burslem club, helping John Rudge to keep the "Valiants" in the Second Division, before returning to Meadow Lane in April. In July 1991 he joined another Second Division side in Leicester City on a free transfer. He enjoyed regular football in the 1991–92 season, helping Brian Little's "Foxes" to an encounter with Blackburn Rovers in the play-off final, though he would finally taste defeat at the national stadium, as Rovers won 1–0.

Leicester would have another crack at the play-off final the following year, though Platnauer would have little contribution to the season, as he lost his first-team place at Filbert Street, and moved to Scunthorpe United on a free transfer in March 1993. He scored two goals in 14 Third Division games for the "Iron" but did not win a longer stay at Glanford Park after Bill Green was sacked for failing to bring promotion. In August 1993, Platnauer signed with Football League newcomers Mansfield Town. He made 32 appearances for the "Stags" in 1993–94, helping Andy King to establish the Field Mill club in mid-table. In February 1994, he joined Keith Alexander at Lincoln City, and they spent the 1993–94 near the foot of the Third Division. There was a managerial merry-go-ground in 1994–95, as Alexander was replaced by John Beck between short spells with Sam Ellis and then Steve Wicks in the hot-seat. On leaving Sincil Bank, Platnauer became a player-coach at Bedworth United, under former Notts County teammate Dean Thomas. He joined the newly amalgamated Hinckley United in 1997. The "Knitters" were then competing in the Division One Midlands of the Southern League, and Platnauer played 51 games despite being in his late 30s.

== Management career ==
Platnauer was appointed as manager of Rothwell Town in 2000 and remained in this post until October 2003. In charge for 2000–01, 2001–02 and 2002–03, the "Bones" posted mid-table finishes in the Southern League Eastern Division. The following month he became caretaker manager of Kettering Town, after the sacking of Dominic Genovese. He remained in charge until December 2003 when Kevin Wilson was installed as manager, Platnauer having ruled himself out of the running.

He took over as manager of his hometown club Bedford Town (where Wilson had previously been manager) in January 2004. He guided Bedford to the play-offs in 2004–05. In 2005–06, he took the club out of the play-offs from the Southern Football League Premier Division to the Conference South. However, Bedford struggled the following season. Platnauer resigned in January 2007 with his side bottom of the table, at the season's end the club had failed to improve their position and were relegated.

In October 2007, Dean Thomas appointed him as assistant manager at Hinckley United. Platnauer left Hinckley United in August 2011, and returned to Bedford Town as assistant manager. He took charge as manager again in 2011 and led the "Eagles" to a tenth-place finish in the Southern League in 2011–12 and 2012–13, before he was forced to resign as part of the club's cost-cutting measures in May 2013.

== Career statistics ==
Appearances and goals by club, season and competition
Club	Season	League			FA Cup		Other		Total	
Club	Season	Division	Apps	Goals	Apps	Goals	Apps	Goals	Apps	Goals
Bristol Rovers	1982–83	Third Division	24	7	1	0	1	1	26	8
Coventry City	1983–84	First Division	34	6	4	0	3	0	41	6
Coventry City	1984–85	First Division	10	0	0	0	2	0	12	0
Coventry City	Total		44	6	4	0	5	0	53	6
Birmingham City	1984–85	Second Division	11	1	4	0	0	0	15	1
Birmingham City	1985–86	First Division	17	1	1	0	3	0	21	1
Birmingham City	Total		28	2	5	0	3	0	36	2
Reading (loan)	1985–86	Third Division	7	0	0	0	1	0	8	0
Cardiff City	1986–87	Fourth Division	38	3	6	0	4	2	48	5
Cardiff City	1987–88	Fourth Division	38	1	1	0	4	0	43	1
Cardiff City	1988–89	Third Division	39	2	2	0	10	0	51	2
Cardiff City	Total		115	6	9	0	18	2	142	8
Notts County	1989–90	Third Division	44	0	1	0	12	0	57	0
Notts County	1990–91	Second Division	13	1	0	0	4	0	17	1
Notts County	Total		57	1	1	0	16	0	74	1
Port Vale (loan)	1990–91	Second Division	14	0	1	0	0	0	15	0
Leicester City	1991–92	Second Division	29	0	0	0	6	0	35	0
Leicester City	1992–93	First Division	6	0	0	0	1	0	7	0
Leicester City	Total		35	0	0	0	7	0	42	0
Scunthorpe United	1992–93	Third Division	14	2	0	0	0	0	14	2
Mansfield Town	1993–94	Third Division	25	0	1	0	6	0	32	0
Lincoln City	1993–94	Third Division	13	0	0	0	0	0	13	0
Lincoln City	1994–95	Third Division	13	0	0	0	4	0	17	0
Lincoln City	1995–96	Third Division	1	0	0	0	0	0	1	0
Lincoln City	Total		27	0	0	0	4	0	31	0
Career total			390	24	22	0	61	3	473	27

== Honours ==
=== Player ===
Birmingham City

- Football League Second Division second-place promotion: 1984–85

Reading

- Football League Third Division: 1985–86

Cardiff City

- Welsh Cup: 1987–88
- Football League Fourth Division second-place promotion: 1987–88

Notts County

- Football League Third Division play-offs: 1990

Individual

- Coventry City Player of the Year: 1983–84

=== Manager ===
Bedford Town

- Southern Football League Premier Division play-offs: 2005–06
