= Howard Gayle =

English footballer (born 1958)

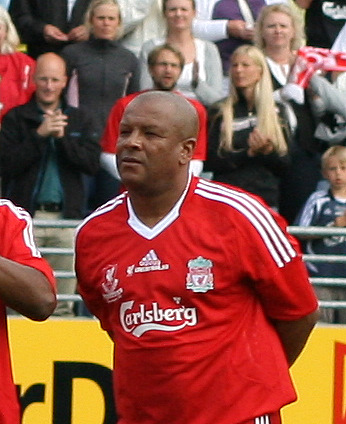
- Gayle playing in a charity match for Liverpool in 2010

Personal information
- Full name: Howard Anthony Gayle
- Date of birth: 18 May 1958 (age 68)
- Place of birth: Toxteth, Liverpool, England
- Height: 5 ft 10 in (1.78 m)
- Positions: Forward; winger

Youth career
- 1974–1977: Liverpool

Senior career*
| Years | Team | Apps | (Gls) |
| 1977–1983 | Liverpool | 4 | (1) |
| 1980 | → Fulham (loan) | 14 | (0) |
| 1982–1983 | → Newcastle United (loan) | 8 | (2) |
| 1983–1984 | Birmingham City | 46 | (9) |
| 1984–1986 | Sunderland | 48 | (4) |
| 1986–1987 | Dallas Sidekicks (indoor) | 30 | (6) |
| 1987 | Stoke City | 6 | (2) |
| 1987–1992 | Blackburn Rovers | 116 | (29) |
| 1992–1993 | Halifax Town | 5 | (0) |
| Total | | 277 | (53) |

International career
| 1984 | England U21 | 3 | (1) |
- * Club domestic league appearances and goals

Howard Anthony Gayle (born 18 May 1958) is an English former footballer who played for Birmingham City, Blackburn Rovers, Fulham, Halifax Town, Liverpool, Newcastle United, Sunderland and Stoke City.

Gayle began his career with Liverpool, becoming the first black player to play for the team. After loan spells with Fulham and Newcastle United he joined Birmingham City in search of regular first team football. He then played for Sunderland and had a short spell in the United States playing indoor football with the Dallas Sidekicks. He returned to England and played for Stoke City, Blackburn Rovers and ended his career with Halifax Town.

== Club career ==
Gayle was born in Toxteth and joined the youth ranks at local side Liverpool in 1974. He signed a professional contract with the club in 1977, becoming the first black player to play for Liverpool, which was seen as a "victory" for the black community in Liverpool.

"It was constantly in the press that I was the first black player to play for Liverpool. It was a landmark as far as black people were concerned, and I was proud to represent the black community of Liverpool"

— Gayle on his important landmark.

His finest hour for Liverpool came in the 1980–81 European Cup semi-final second leg away at Bayern Munich when he came on as an early substitute to help Liverpool draw 1–1 and progress to the final on the away goals rule. Although he was a non-playing substitute in the final, he was rewarded with a winner's medal. After loan spells at Fulham and Newcastle United he left Anfield after making just five appearances. While at Newcastle he became the first Black player to represent them in the Football League when he made his debut against Cambridge United on 27 November 1982.

Gayle joined Birmingham City where he played in the 1982–83 season scoring once against West Ham and then he hit 10 in 45 during the 1983–84 campaign. Gayle then signed for Len Ashurst's Sunderland, where he became a popular player playing in two seasons before moving to the United States to play for Dallas Sidekicks in the Major Indoor Soccer League. He returned to England in April 1987 to play for Stoke City, playing six matches at the end of the 1986–87 season, scoring twice in a 3–2 defeat against Bradford City.

He then spent five years at Blackburn Rovers, where he was that club's first black player, the third club where he had achieved this milestone. He signed for them in 1987 and was a regular striker in their quest for top-flight football after an absence of more than 20 years.

He scored a total of 23 goals in the 1988–89 season, but Blackburn missed out on promotion with a playoff final defeat.

However, by the time Blackburn were promoted to the newly created Premier League in 1992, Gayle had fallen down the pecking order in favour of expensive new signings Mike Newell and David Speedie, and with the arrival of national record signing Alan Shearer that summer, it was clear that Blackburn manager Kenny Dalglish felt that Gayle was surplus to requirements at Ewood Park.

Gayle joined Halifax Town in the newly renamed Division Three but managed just five league appearances as they were relegated to the Football Conference. After leaving Halifax he had a brief trial at Carlisle United, before retiring from football.

== International career ==
As an over age player, he helped England win the 1984 UEFA European Under-21 Football Championship, in which he scored a goal in the final against Spain.

== Personal life ==
Gayle was born to a father from Sierra Leone and a mother from Ghana. In August 2016, it was reported that Gayle had turned down a nomination for an MBE for his work with "Show Racism the Red Card", saying it would be "a betrayal to all of the Africans who have lost their lives, or who have suffered as a result of Empire."

He released his autobiography in October 2016 titled 61 Minutes in Munich.

== Career statistics ==
Appearances and goals by club, season and competition
| Club | Season | League | | | FA Cup | | League Cup | | Other | | Total | |
| Club | Season | Division | Apps | Goals | Apps | Goals | Apps | Goals | Apps | Goals | Apps | Goals |
|---|---|---|---|---|---|---|---|---|---|---|---|---|
| Liverpool | 1979–80 | First Division | 0 | 0 | 0 | 0 | 0 | 0 | 0 | 0 | 0 | 0 |
| Liverpool | 1980–81 | First Division | 4 | 1 | 0 | 0 | 0 | 0 | 1 (Note: Appearance in European Cup) | 0 | 5 | 1 |
| Liverpool | 1981–82 | First Division | 0 | 0 | 0 | 0 | 0 | 0 | 0 | 0 | 0 | 0 |
| Liverpool | 1982–83 | First Division | 0 | 0 | 0 | 0 | 0 | 0 | 0 | 0 | 0 | 0 |
| Liverpool | Total | | 4 | 1 | 0 | 0 | 0 | 0 | 1 | 0 | 5 | 1 |
| Fulham (loan) | 1979–80 | Second Division | 14 | 0 | 0 | 0 | 0 | 0 | 0 | 0 | 14 | 0 |
| Newcastle United (loan) | 1982–83 | Second Division | 8 | 2 | 0 | 0 | 0 | 0 | 0 | 0 | 8 | 2 |
| Birmingham City | 1982–83 | First Division | 13 | 1 | 1 | 0 | 0 | 0 | 0 | 0 | 14 | 1 |
| Birmingham City | 1983–84 | First Division | 33 | 8 | 4 | 0 | 8 | 2 | 0 | 0 | 45 | 10 |
| Birmingham City | Total | | 46 | 9 | 5 | 0 | 8 | 2 | 0 | 0 | 59 | 11 |
| Sunderland | 1984–85 | First Division | 25 | 2 | 1 | 0 | 7 | 1 | 0 | 0 | 33 | 3 |
| Sunderland | 1985–86 | Second Division | 23 | 2 | 2 | 0 | 1 | 0 | 2 (Note: Appearances in Full Members' Cup) | 0 | 28 | 2 |
| Sunderland | Total | | 48 | 4 | 3 | 0 | 8 | 1 | 2 | 0 | 61 | 5 |
| Dallas Sidekicks | 1986–87 | MISL | 30 | 6 | 0 | 0 | 0 | 0 | 0 | 0 | 30 | 6 |
| Stoke City | 1986–87 | Second Division | 6 | 2 | 0 | 0 | 0 | 0 | 0 | 0 | 6 | 2 |
| Blackburn Rovers | 1987–88 | Second Division | 13 | 1 | 0 | 0 | 1 | 0 | 2 (Note: Appearances in Second Division play-offs) | 0 | 16 | 1 |
| Blackburn Rovers | 1988–89 | Second Division | 45 | 19 | 3 | 0 | 4 | 1 | 6 (Note: Two appearances and one goal in Full Members' Cup, four appearances and two goals in Second Division play-offs) | 3 | 58 | 23 |
| Blackburn Rovers | 1989–90 | Second Division | 30 | 5 | 2 | 0 | 1 | 0 | 3 (Note: One appearance in Full Members' Cup, two appearances and one goal in Second Division play-offs) | 1 | 36 | 6 |
| Blackburn Rovers | 1990–91 | Second Division | 24 | 4 | 2 | 0 | 1 | 0 | 0 | 0 | 27 | 4 |
| Blackburn Rovers | 1991–92 | Second Division | 4 | 0 | 0 | 0 | 2 | 0 | 1 | 0 | 7 | 0 |
| Blackburn Rovers | Total | | 116 | 29 | 7 | 0 | 9 | 1 | 12 | 4 | 144 | 34 |
| Halifax Town | 1992–93 | Third Division | 5 | 0 | 0 | 0 | 0 | 0 | 0 | 0 | 5 | 0 |
| Career total | | | 277 | 53 | 15 | 0 | 25 | 4 | 15 | 3 | 332 | 61 |

== Honours ==
Liverpool

- European Cup: 1980–81

Sunderland

- Football League Cup runner-up: 1984–85

England under-21

- UEFA European Under-21 Football Championship: 1984
