= Noel Blake =

Jamaican footballer (born 1962)

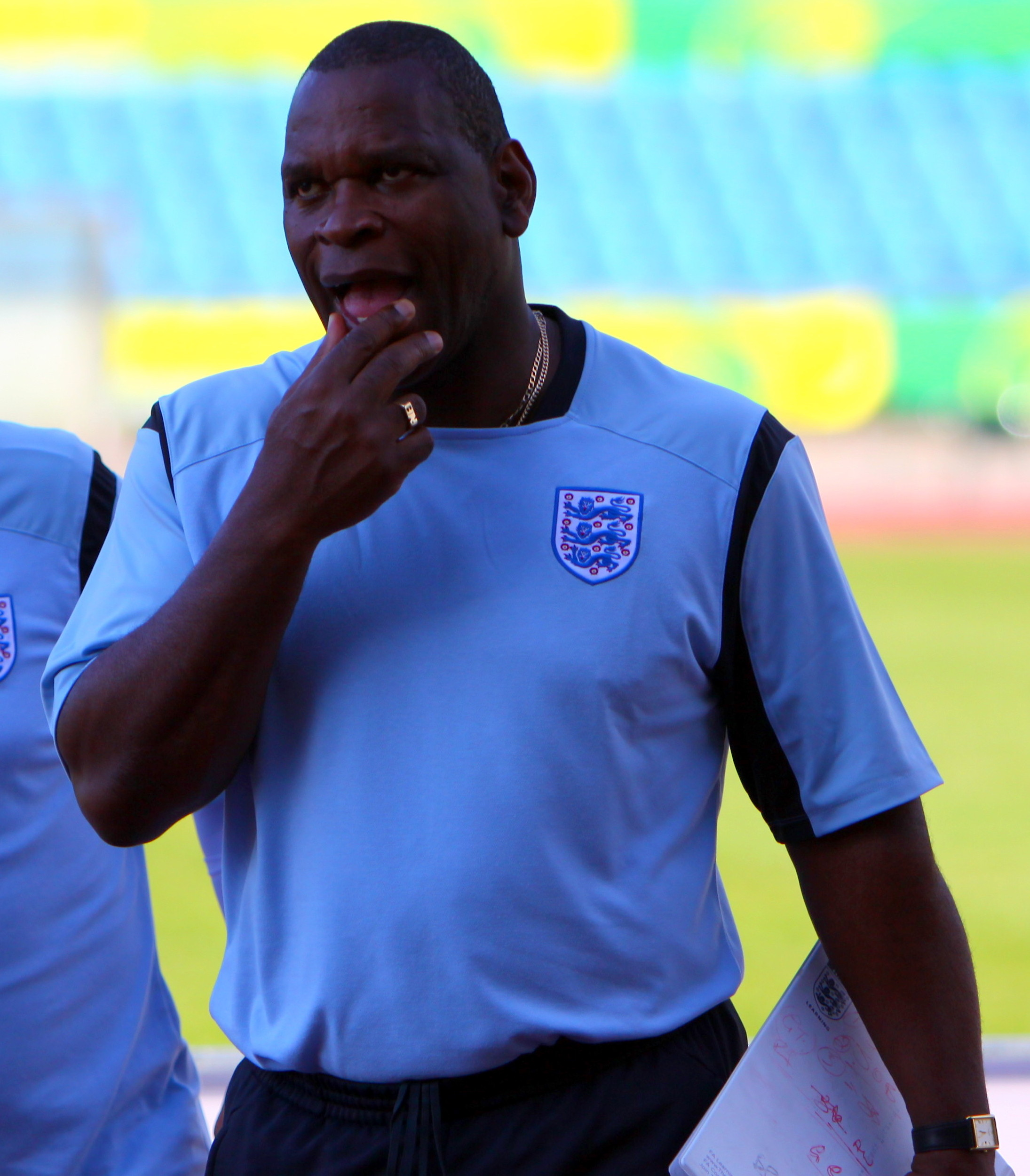
- Blake as manager of England U19 in 2012

Personal information
- Full name: Noel Lloyd George Blake
- Date of birth: 12 January 1962 (age 64)
- Place of birth: Kingston, Jamaica
- Height: 6 ft 0 in (1.83 m)
- Position: Defender

Youth career
- 1978–1979: Sutton Coldfield Town
- 1979–1980: Aston Villa

Senior career*
Years	Team	Apps	(Gls)
1980–1982	Aston Villa	4	(0)
1982	→ Shrewsbury Town (loan)	6	(0)
1982–1984	Birmingham City	76	(5)
1984–1988	Portsmouth	144	(10)
1988–1990	Leeds United	51	(4)
1990–1992	Stoke City	75	(3)
1992	→ Bradford City (loan)	6	(0)
1992–1993	Bradford City	39	(3)
1993–1995	Dundee	54	(2)
1995–2001	Exeter City	147	(10)
Total		602	(37)

Managerial career
- 2000–2001: Exeter City
- 2009–2014: England U19
- * Club domestic league appearances and goals

Noel Lloyd George Blake (born 12 January 1962) is a former professional footballer and current coach. He was formerly the head coach of the England national under-19 football team. He played in the Football League for Aston Villa, Shrewsbury Town, Birmingham City, Portsmouth, Leeds United, Stoke City, Bradford City and Exeter City, and in the Scottish Football League for Dundee.

== Playing career ==
Born in Kingston, Jamaica, Blake moved to England and played football with non-league side Sutton Coldfield Town. He was spotted by scouts at Aston Villa who signed Blake a year later. He struggled to force his way into the Villa side and went out on loan to Shrewsbury Town in 1982. He left Villa upon his return and joined local rivals Birmingham City. He quickly became a fan favourite with Birmingham as he scored against Villa in December 1982.

He spent two years with Birmingham before signing with Portsmouth on the south coast. Whilst he did enjoy some success at 'Pompey' winning promotion as Second Division runners-up in 1987, Blake had problems with racial abuse from his own supporters, at a time when racism was still rife in English football. After making over 150 appearances with Portsmouth, Blake joined Leeds United on a free transfer and he helped to club to promotion as Second Division champions in the 1989–90 season. However his opportunities were limited the following season and so he was sold to Stoke City just after promotion was achieved, with Howard Wilkinson looking to spend heavily on new players to build a squad capable of competing with the very best in the First Division.

Blake's old manager at Portsmouth Alan Ball tempted Blake to join him at Stoke City in 1990. Ball was sacked in February 1991 as Stoke went on to record their worst league position of 14th in the third tier. Stoke's new manager Lou Macari only used Blake sparingly and later joined Bradford City on loan in 1992. He joined Bradford permanently and latter played for Scottish side Dundee before ending his playing career with Exeter City.

== Coaching career ==
Blake held the position of manager of Exeter City from January 2000 until September 2001.

A qualified coach and holder of the UEFA Pro Licence, Blake was appointed in February 2007 as one of the Football Association's National Coaches to work with players in England's youth teams and to assist with coach education. He was placed in charge of the England under-19 team in 2009, leading the side to the semi-finals of the UEFA European Under-19 Championship in both 2010 and 2012 before leaving the Football Association in June 2014.

On 1 July it was reported that Blake was about to become first-team coach at Blackpool. On 27 October Blake was put in temporary charge following the departure of Jose Riga. He left Blackpool in December 2014.

== Personal life ==
Blake suffered a stroke in August 2015.

== Career statistics ==
=== As a player ===
Appearances and goals by club, season and competition
Club	Season	League			FA Cup		League Cup		Other^{[A]}		Total	
Club	Season	Division	Apps	Goals	Apps	Goals	Apps	Goals	Apps	Goals	Apps	Goals
Aston Villa	1979–80	First Division	3	0	0	0	0	0	0	0	3	0
Aston Villa	1980–81	First Division	0	0	0	0	0	0	0	0	0	0
Aston Villa	1981–82	First Division	1	0	0	0	0	0	0	0	1	0
Aston Villa	Total		4	0	0	0	0	0	0	0	4	0
Shrewsbury Town (loan)	1981–82	Second Division	6	0	0	0	0	0	0	0	6	0
Birmingham City	1982–83	First Division	37	3	3	0	4	0	0	0	44	3
Birmingham City	1983–84	First Division	39	2	5	0	8	0	0	0	52	2
Birmingham City	Total		76	5	8	0	12	0	0	0	96	5
Portsmouth	1984–85	Second Division	42	3	2	0	4	0	0	0	48	3
Portsmouth	1985–86	Second Division	42	4	2	1	7	1	3	1	54	7
Portsmouth	1986–87	Second Division	41	3	2	0	3	0	3	0	49	3
Portsmouth	1987–88	First Division	19	0	4	1	0	0	0	0	23	1
Portsmouth	Total		144	10	10	2	14	1	6	1	174	14
Leeds United	1988–89	Second Division	44	4	2	0	3	0	2	0	51	4
Leeds United	1989–90	Second Division	7	0	0	0	2	0	2	0	11	0
Leeds United	Total		51	4	2	0	5	0	4	0	62	4
Stoke City	1989–90	Second Division	18	0	0	0	0	0	0	0	18	0
Stoke City	1990–91	Third Division	44	3	3	0	4	0	1	0	52	3
Stoke City	1991–92	Third Division	13	0	1	0	2	0	4	0	20	0
Stoke City	Total		75	3	4	0	6	0	5	0	90	3
Bradford City	1991–92	Third Division	6	0	0	0	0	0	0	0	6	0
Bradford City	1992–93	Second Division	32	3	3	1	2	0	3	0	40	3
Bradford City	1993–94	Second Division	7	0	2	0	1	0	1	0	11	0
Bradford City	Total		45	3	5	1	3	0	4	0	57	3
Dundee	1993–94	Scottish Premier Division										
Dundee	1994–95	Scottish First Division										
Dundee	Total		54	2	5	0	2	0	3	0	64	2
Exeter City	1995–96	Third Division	44	2	1	0	2	0	0	0	47	2
Exeter City	1996–97	Third Division	46	6	2	0	2	0	2	0	52	6
Exeter City	1997–98	Third Division	38	1	2	0	2	0	1	0	43	1
Exeter City	1998–99	Third Division	7	0	1	0	0	0	0	0	8	0
Exeter City	1999–2000	Third Division	7	1	0	0	0	0	2	0	9	1
Exeter City	2000–01	Third Division	5	0	0	0	0	0	0	0	5	0
Exeter City	Total		147	10	6	0	6	0	5	0	164	10
Career total			602	37	40	3	48	1	27	1	717	42

A. The "Other" column constitutes appearances and goals in the Football League Trophy, Football League play-offs Full Members Cup.

=== As a manager ===
Team	From	To	Record				
Team	From	To	G	W	D	L	Win %
Exeter City	10 January 2000	24 September 2001	86	20	24	42	23.26
England U19	8 September 2009	26 June 2014	52	33	12	7	63.46

== Honours ==
Portsmouth

- Football League Second Division runner-up: 1986–87

Leeds United

- Football League Second Division: 1989–90

Individual

- PFA Team of the Year: 1986–87 Second Division
