= Wayne Clarke (footballer) =

English footballer (born 1961)

Personal information
- Full name: Wayne Clarke
- Date of birth: 28 February 1961 (age 65)
- Place of birth: Short Heath, England
- Height: 6 ft 0 in (1.83 m)
- Position: Striker

Youth career
- 1976–1978: Wolverhampton Wanderers

Senior career*
| Years | Team | Apps | (Gls) |
| 1978–1984 | Wolverhampton Wanderers | 148 | (30) |
| 1984–1987 | Birmingham City | 92 | (38) |
| 1987–1989 | Everton | 57 | (18) |
| 1989–1990 | Leicester City | 11 | (1) |
| 1990–1992 | Manchester City | 21 | (2) |
| 1990 | → Shrewsbury Town (loan) | 7 | (6) |
| 1991 | → Stoke City (loan) | 9 | (3) |
| 1991 | → Wolverhampton Wanderers (loan) | 1 | (0) |
| 1992–1993 | Walsall | 39 | (21) |
| 1993–1995 | Shrewsbury Town | 59 | (22) |
| 1995–1996 | Telford United | | |
| Total | | 444 | (141) |

International career
| 1976 | England Schoolboys | 8 | (6) |
| 1978–1979 | England Youth | 4 | (3) |

Managerial career
- 1995–1996: Telford United (player-manager)
- * Club domestic league appearances and goals

Wayne Clarke (born 28 February 1961) is an English former professional footballer.

Playing as a striker, he scored nearly 150 goals over the course of his career and was a member of the Everton team which finished as English league champions in 1987. He made almost 450 appearances in the Football League, playing for Wolverhampton Wanderers, Birmingham City, Everton, Leicester City, Manchester City, Shrewsbury Town, Stoke City and Walsall. He represented England at schoolboy and youth level.

He is the youngest of five brothers. Frank, Allan, Derek and Kelvin who all played league football.

== Playing career ==
=== Wolverhampton Wanderers ===
Clarke was born in Short Heath, the fifth son of Frank Clarke Sr.

He joined his home-town club Wolverhampton Wanderers as an associate schoolboy on his 15th birthday in 1976, despite competition from leading clubs, and became an apprentice when he left school the following year.

Clubs that were interested in taking Clarke at the time included Arsenal and Leeds where he had trials and both Merseysider teams were keen too. Clarke and his parents also went for a meal with Brian Clough who was managing Nottingham Forest and was to be told "look, I want you to come with us" but he preferred to stay at home and signed for the Wanderers.

Before any professional debut, Clarke represented England at schoolboy level.

On his international schoolboys days, Clarke recalls "My first game as an England Schoolboy was at Oxford United's old ground, we beat Northern Ireland 5-0. I scored a hat-trick playing on the wing. I scored my third goal directly from a corner kick. We played West Germany in Koblenz and the Dutch in Holland. I also played at Wembley twice, against France and Wales."

Clarke signed his first professional contract in March 1978, and made his first team debut as a substitute on 9 May 1978 in a 2–1 win away to Ipswich Town aged 17, replacing Mel Eves in the final game of the 1977–78 season. Another debutant that day would be future England captain Terry Butcher.

Now in the 1978/79 season, Clarke, still aged 17, was next named on the bench for Wolves by Sammy Chung for the visit of Bristol City and the travel to Southampton in September 1978 before starting games home to Ipswich, away at Everton, home to Arsenal and away at Middlesbrough by the end of October.

Brian Clough, seemingly still an admirer, came calling for Clarke again that November, this time to represent England at Junior level but the club replied declining the call up and sending their apologies with the player now on the fringes of the Wolves first team.

Many people were keeping tabs on the young West Midlander. Following his first start at home to Ipswich which finished in a 1–0 defeat for Wolves, Ipswich manager Ron Atkinson met Clarke in the club boardroom to pass on some advice. Clarke recalls 'Big Ron' telling him "I thought you played really well today and I will look forward to watching your career. I know you were beaten today but don't be too down-hearted. When I made my debut, we lost five."

A month on from Clarkes 18th birthday with Wolves sat 20th in the table (of 22 teams), Clarke scored his first Wolves goal in a 3–3 draw versus QPR away at Loftus Road.

In total the teenager would make 9 appearances that season with the club finishing 18th in the league.

Clarke would feature 20 times with 2 goals during the 1979/80 season which would result in the club finishing 6th in the league and was a member of the 16-man travelling squad when Wolves won the League Cup in 1980, but did not play. Competing for starting places with Andy Gray and John Richards.

Clarke made 22 starts and 10 appearances off the bench during the 1980/81 season including coming on as a 78th-minute substitute in Eindhoven as Wolves faced PSV in UEFA Cup and was a member of the team that suffered relegation from the First Division in 1981/82 but reclaimed their top flight status the following season contributing with 42 starts and 13 goals.

Clarke left the club at the end of the 1983 - 84 season following a second relegation from the top flight, contributing a further 10 goals in 36 appearances. "In my last season at Wolves (1983/84), I was on a monthly rolling contract. I would have gladly signed a new contract if they'd improved the squad, but they never did. We were relegated again at the end of the season and I realised I had to leave." Stated Clarke in a 2022 interview.

He scored 33 goals in 170 appearances in all competitions before Ron Saunders took him to Second Division Birmingham City in 1984. The fee of £80,000 was set by tribunal and included a clause entitling Wolves to half of any profit made from a future sale of the player.

=== Birmingham City ===
Clarke scored 19 goals in his first season at Birmingham, which made him their leading scorer. His 17 league goals made a major contribution to the club winning promotion from the Second Division in 1984–85. His season in the top flight with Birmingham was interrupted by suspension and minor injuries, and he only managed five goals as the side were relegated, which included scoring twice in Birmingham's 3–0 win in the local derby away to Aston Villa. In 1986–87, Clarke again scored 19 goals, which again made him leading scorer. Clarke believes that during this time there was interest from Italian Club Bari, but with Birmingham struggling to avoid further relegation to the Third Division and in financial difficulties, the club accepted an offer from Everton who were in need of an emergency replacement for the injured Graeme Sharp. Clarke joined Everton in March 1987 together with inexperienced reserve striker Stuart Storer, the pair jointly valued at £300,000. Former club Wolves complained to the Football League because they believed Birmingham were deliberately inflating the valuation placed on Storer to reduce the amount they would owe Wolves under the sell-on clause for Clarke. Birmingham's actions may have been an attempt to recoup money lost on the 1981 sale of Joe Gallagher to Wolves, when the club was declared bankrupt the following year still owing most of the £350,000 fee.

=== Everton ===
Joining Everton in the closing months of the 1986–87 season, Clarke quickly established himself as a key member of Everton's championship-winning side scoring five goals in ten games, notably the winning goal away at Arsenal not long after he joined, and earning himself a championship medal. He then began the following season with the only goal in a 1–0 Charity Shield win over FA Cup winners Coventry City at Wembley, and later scored the only goal in the Merseyside derby that not only beat arch-rivals Liverpool, but also prevented them setting a new record of 30 games unbeaten from the start of a season. However, with Graeme Sharp and Adrian Heath being Everton's main striking partnership, Clarke's appearances for Everton in the 1987–88 and 1988–89 seasons were largely limited to coming on from the substitute's bench or covering for Sharp or Heath when they were injured. He helped Everton reach the FA Cup final but did not play in the final (which Everton lost to Liverpool), following which Everton brought in Mike Newell from Leicester City in part exchange for Clarke and £500,000.

=== Leicester City ===
When Clarke moved to Leicester there was interest in him from Ron Atkinson at Sheffield Wednesday, Jim Smith at Newcastle United as well as David Pleat at Leicester.

Despite scoring on his debut for the club, Clarke's return to the Second Division was brief. After just 11 league games and one goal, Clarke returned to the top flight with Manchester City, managed by Howard Kendall who had bought him for Everton three years earlier. He moved in a part-exchange deal valued at £650,000 which saw David Oldfield join Leicester.

=== Manchester City ===
Clarke was unable to claim a regular place in the Manchester City side. While at Maine Road he was loaned to Shrewsbury Town, where he scored six goals in seven games, then to Stoke City (three goals in nine matches), and then back to Wolves, where he was viewed as a potential partner for Steve Bull. However his first appearance for the club lasted just 20 minutes before he punctured a lung, returned to Manchester City, and on his return to fitness was not allowed out on loan again.

Clarke recalls a particular incident playing for Manchester City with fondness involving Brian Clough who was a family friend and had tried to sign Clarke as a schoolboy, then as an England youth.

"Some years later, I went on as a half-time substitute for Manchester City at the City Ground and felt a sharp nudge in the back as I was making my way down the tunnel. It came with an unmistakable voice: Young man, you'd have been a better player if you had come and signed for me. I smiled, made my way on to the pitch and, mid-way through the half, scored with a diving header to clinch victory. I turned towards the dug-outs and there was Cloughie giving me his distinctive thumbs-up as if to say 'great goal, son.'"

=== Walsall ===
Clarke's next move came in the summer of 1992 when he joined Walsall in Division Three. He was the fourth of the brothers to play for Walsall, and the move meant he had played in all four divisions of the Football League. He was the club's top scorer in the 1992–93 season with 21 goals in 39 games, helping them to a playoff position, but they were heavily defeated in the playoff semi-final by Crewe Alexandra and Clarke was sold to local rivals Shrewsbury Town, managed by former Wolves goalkeeper Fred Davies.

=== Shrewsbury Town ===
Clarke spent two seasons at Gay Meadow having previously had a successful loan period at the club several years earlier. Clarke joined Shrewsbury from Walsall on the eve of The 1993–94 season. Clarke had a successful season finishing second top scorer with 18 goals, helping to bring the Division Three title and promotion to Division Two. Clarke was the youngest brother of Frank Clarke whom had also played for Shrewsbury Town as a striker. The club released him at the end of the 1994–95 season, he had scored 22 goals in 59 games.

== Managerial career ==
Clarke was appointed player-manager of Telford United in the Conference in July 1995, and resigned 18 months later after a spell of poor results, though with the club in mid-table. In June 1997 he applied for the vacant manager's post at former club Walsall, but was unsuccessful.

== Career statistics ==
Appearances and goals by club, season and competition
| Club | Season | League | | | FA Cup | | League Cup | | Other^{[A]} | | Total | |
| Club | Season | Division | Apps | Goals | Apps | Goals | Apps | Goals | Apps | Goals | Apps | Goals |
|---|---|---|---|---|---|---|---|---|---|---|---|---|
| Wolverhampton Wanderers | 1977–78 | First Division | 1 | 0 | 0 | 0 | 0 | 0 | 0 | 0 | 1 | 0 |
| Wolverhampton Wanderers | 1978–79 | First Division | 8 | 1 | 1 | 0 | 0 | 0 | 0 | 0 | 9 | 0 |
| Wolverhampton Wanderers | 1979–80 | First Division | 16 | 2 | 1 | 0 | 3 | 0 | 0 | 0 | 20 | 2 |
| Wolverhampton Wanderers | 1980–81 | First Division | 24 | 3 | 5 | 0 | 2 | 0 | 1 | 0 | 32 | 3 |
| Wolverhampton Wanderers | 1981–82 | First Division | 29 | 6 | 0 | 0 | 1 | 0 | 0 | 0 | 27 | 6 |
| Wolverhampton Wanderers | 1982–83 | Second Division | 39 | 12 | 1 | 0 | 2 | 0 | 0 | 0 | 42 | 12 |
| Wolverhampton Wanderers | 1983–84 | First Division | 31 | 6 | 3 | 1 | 2 | 2 | 0 | 0 | 36 | 9 |
| Wolverhampton Wanderers | Total | | 148 | 30 | 11 | 1 | 10 | 2 | 1 | 0 | 170 | 33 |
| Birmingham City | 1984–85 | Second Division | 40 | 17 | 4 | 0 | 3 | 2 | 0 | 0 | 47 | 19 |
| Birmingham City | 1985–86 | First Division | 28 | 5 | 0 | 0 | 0 | 0 | 0 | 0 | 28 | 5 |
| Birmingham City | 1986–87 | Second Division | 24 | 16 | 1 | 0 | 3 | 2 | 2 | 1 | 30 | 19 |
| Birmingham City | Total | | 92 | 38 | 5 | 0 | 6 | 4 | 2 | 1 | 105 | 43 |
| Everton | 1986–87 | First Division | 10 | 5 | 0 | 0 | 0 | 0 | 0 | 0 | 10 | 5 |
| Everton | 1987–88 | First Division | 27 | 10 | 7 | 0 | 5 | 1 | 1 | 1 | 40 | 12 |
| Everton | 1988–89 | First Division | 20 | 3 | 3 | 0 | 1 | 0 | 2 | 2 | 26 | 5 |
| Everton | Total | | 57 | 18 | 10 | 0 | 6 | 1 | 3 | 3 | 76 | 22 |
| Leicester City | 1989–90 | Second Division | 11 | 1 | 0 | 0 | 1 | 1 | 0 | 0 | 11 | 1 |
| Manchester City | 1989–90 | First Division | 9 | 0 | 0 | 0 | 0 | 0 | 0 | 0 | 9 | 0 |
| Manchester City | 1990–91 | First Division | 7 | 1 | 1 | 0 | 0 | 0 | 1 | 0 | 9 | 1 |
| Manchester City | 1991–92 | First Division | 5 | 1 | 0 | 0 | 0 | 0 | 0 | 0 | 5 | 1 |
| Manchester City | Total | | 21 | 2 | 1 | 0 | 0 | 0 | 1 | 0 | 23 | 2 |
| Shrewsbury Town (loan) | 1990–91 | Third Division | 7 | 6 | 0 | 0 | 0 | 0 | 1 | 0 | 8 | 6 |
| Stoke City (loan) | 1990–91 | Third Division | 9 | 3 | 0 | 0 | 0 | 0 | 0 | 0 | 9 | 3 |
| Wolverhampton Wanderers (loan) | 1991–92 | Second Division | 1 | 0 | 0 | 0 | 0 | 0 | 0 | 0 | 1 | 0 |
| Walsall | 1992–93 | Third Division | 39 | 21 | 1 | 0 | 4 | 1 | 4 | 2 | 48 | 24 |
| Shrewsbury Town | 1993–94 | Third Division | 28 | 11 | 2 | 0 | 3 | 0 | 1 | 0 | 34 | 11 |
| Shrewsbury Town | 1994–95 | Third Division | 31 | 11 | 0 | 0 | 2 | 1 | 1 | 0 | 34 | 12 |
| Shrewsbury Town | Total | | 59 | 22 | 2 | 0 | 5 | 1 | 2 | 0 | 68 | 23 |
| Career Total | | | 444 | 141 | 30 | 1 | 32 | 10 | 14 | 6 | 520 | 158 |

A. The "Other" column constitutes appearances and goals in the FA Charity Shield, Football League Trophy, Football League play-offs, Full Members Cup and UEFA Cup.

== Honours ==
Wolverhampton Wanderers

- Football League Second Division promotion: 1982–83

Birmingham City

- Football League Second Division promotion 1984–85

Everton

- Football League First Division: 1986–87
- FA Charity Shield: 1987

Shrewsbury Town

- Football League Third Division: 1993–94
