= Steve Wigley =

English football player and coach (born 1961)

Personal information
- Full name: Steven Wigley
- Date of birth: 15 October 1961 (age 65)
- Place of birth: Ashton-under-Lyne, England
- Height: 5 ft 9 in (1.75 m)
- Position: Winger

Team information
- Current team: Fulham U23 (manager)

Youth career
- Curzon Ashton

Senior career*
| Years | Team | Apps | (Gls) |
| 1981–1985 | Nottingham Forest | 82 | (2) |
| 1985–1987 | Sheffield United | 28 | (1) |
| 1987–1989 | Birmingham City | 87 | (4) |
| 1989–1993 | Portsmouth | 120 | (12) |
| 1993–1994 | Exeter City | 23 | (1) |
| 1994–1995 | Bognor Regis Town | | |

Managerial career
- 1995–1997: Aldershot Town
- 2004: Southampton (caretaker)
- 2004: Southampton
- 2005–2007: Manchester City Reservers
- 2009–2010: Bolton Wanderers (caretaker)
- 2012–2014: Fulham U18
- 2015–2021: Fulham U18
- 2021–: Fulham U23
- * Club domestic league appearances and goals

Steven Wigley (born 15 October 1961) is an English football coach and former player for Nottingham Forest, Sheffield United, Birmingham City, Portsmouth and Exeter City. He made 340 appearances in the Football League. He is the former manager of Southampton and the former assistant manager of Bristol City. He is the manager of Fulham U23s.

== Playing career ==
Born in Ashton-under-Lyne, Wigley earned a reputation as a tricky winger for home-town club Curzon Ashton, jinking his way through defences and dazzling crowds with his skilful ball displays. It was this that attracted Brian Clough who promptly signed him for Nottingham Forest. After making his debut as a 21-year-old, Wigley played 82 times for Forest before moving to Sheffield United in 1985. Unfortunately, he never found success in Sheffield and moved to Birmingham City soon after, when a spectacular display against Portsmouth persuaded that club's manager, Alan Ball, to sign him. After spending four years of mixed fortunes on the South Coast, helping Portsmouth to the 1992 FA Cup semi final where they lost on a penalty shootout to Liverpool, Wigley moved to Exeter to finish his Football League playing career and then having a brief spell with non-league Bognor Regis Town before taking on his first managerial job at Aldershot Town.

== Coaching and managerial career ==
=== Aldershot Town ===
Wigley was appointed as manager of Aldershot Town after the departure of Steve Wignall. The Shots were by this time in the Isthmian League first division but failed to achieve promotion under Wigley's leadership, finishing 4th, 5th and finally 7th in his three-year period with the club. Wigley is one of only two Aldershot Town managers not to have achieved promotion during his spell in charge of the Club.

=== Nottingham Forest ===
After three years at Aldershot, Academy Director Paul Hart persuaded him to return to Nottingham Forest as assistant academy director. In his time at Forest, Wigley moved up the ranks to become first team coach before short-lived Saints boss Stuart Gray lured him to Southampton as academy director in the summer of 2001. At the same time, David Platt, England Under 21 manager, asked Wigley to help out with coaching the young internationals.

=== Southampton ===
During Gordon Strachan's reign at Southampton, Wigley moved to focus more on the first team than the academy players. When Strachan left the club in 2004, Wigley was asked to step in as caretaker. Wigley clearly felt ill at ease in charge of the Saints so after two games in charge, Paul Sturrock was brought in from Plymouth Argyle. During the rumoured player disputes with Sturrock, Wigley stepped in as an intermediary and helped solve differences at the club.

When Sturrock left the club in August 2004 only two games into the new season, chairman Rupert Lowe confirmed that Wigley had been appointed full-time manager and not just caretaker. Opponents of Wigley claimed that, with only three years in charge of Aldershot, a non-league club, he was not yet ready for Premier League management. However, some fans were happy with the appointment as it meant that Glenn Hoddle, widely reviled by many Saints fans could not return.

Wigley's first tenure in the Premiership ended prematurely: he was dismissed by Southampton on 8 December after just 14 matches, the only win coming in the local derby against arch-rivals and former club Portsmouth. Wigley resumed duties with the club's young players but finally left the club later in the season.

=== Manchester City ===
After leaving Southampton, Wigley joined up with former Nottingham Forest teammate Stuart Pearce at Manchester City as assistant manager/first team coach. During his first season at City, he guided City's reserve team to third place in the Premiership North Reserve League. Wigley left City after Pearce was sacked in May 2007.

=== England Under-21 ===
Wigley teamed up with Pearce again, this time as England Under-21 coach, after Pearce was appointed to this role in 2007. In August 2007 the Football Association appointed Wigley as a national coach, assuming responsibility for the 17–21 age groups to help develop young players. When Pearce was made caretaker manager of the full England team in February 2012, Wigley accompanied him as his assistant.

=== Bolton Wanderers ===
On 8 July 2008, Wigley joined the Bolton Wanderers backroom staff as head coach following a decision by Gary Megson to restructure the club's coaching staff. On 30 December 2009, he and Chris Evans were appointed joint caretaker managers of Bolton following Megson's sacking, but he left the club a few days later after Owen Coyle's appointment.

=== Hull City ===
On 17 March 2010, he was appointed as coach at Premier League club, Hull City, under new manager, Iain Dowie.

=== Bristol City ===
On 18 August 2010, Wigley became assistant manager to Keith Millen at Bristol City on a one-year rolling contract. Millen stated: "Steve was the man I wanted. He was always the name at the front of the list." Millen left the club in October 2011, and Wigley left a few weeks later by mutual consent.

=== Hull City ===
On 18 November, Wigley rejoined Hull City as first-team coach. After Steve Bruce was appointed team manager on 8 June 2012, Wigley and fellow first team coach Stuart Watkiss left the club.

=== Fulham ===
Shortly afterwards, Wigley was appointed head of coaching and under-18 manager at the Fulham Academy.

=== Nottingham Forest ===
Wigley left Fulham in May 2014 to again team up with Stuart Pearce as his assistant manager at Nottingham Forest. After Dougie Freedman replaced Pearce as manager on 1 February 2015, Wigley and the remainder of the backroom staff left the following day.

=== Return to Fulham ===
On 30 June 2015, Wigley rejoined Fulham as U18s manager. In 2021, he was promoted to manager of the U23s.
