= Guy Russell (footballer) =

English footballer

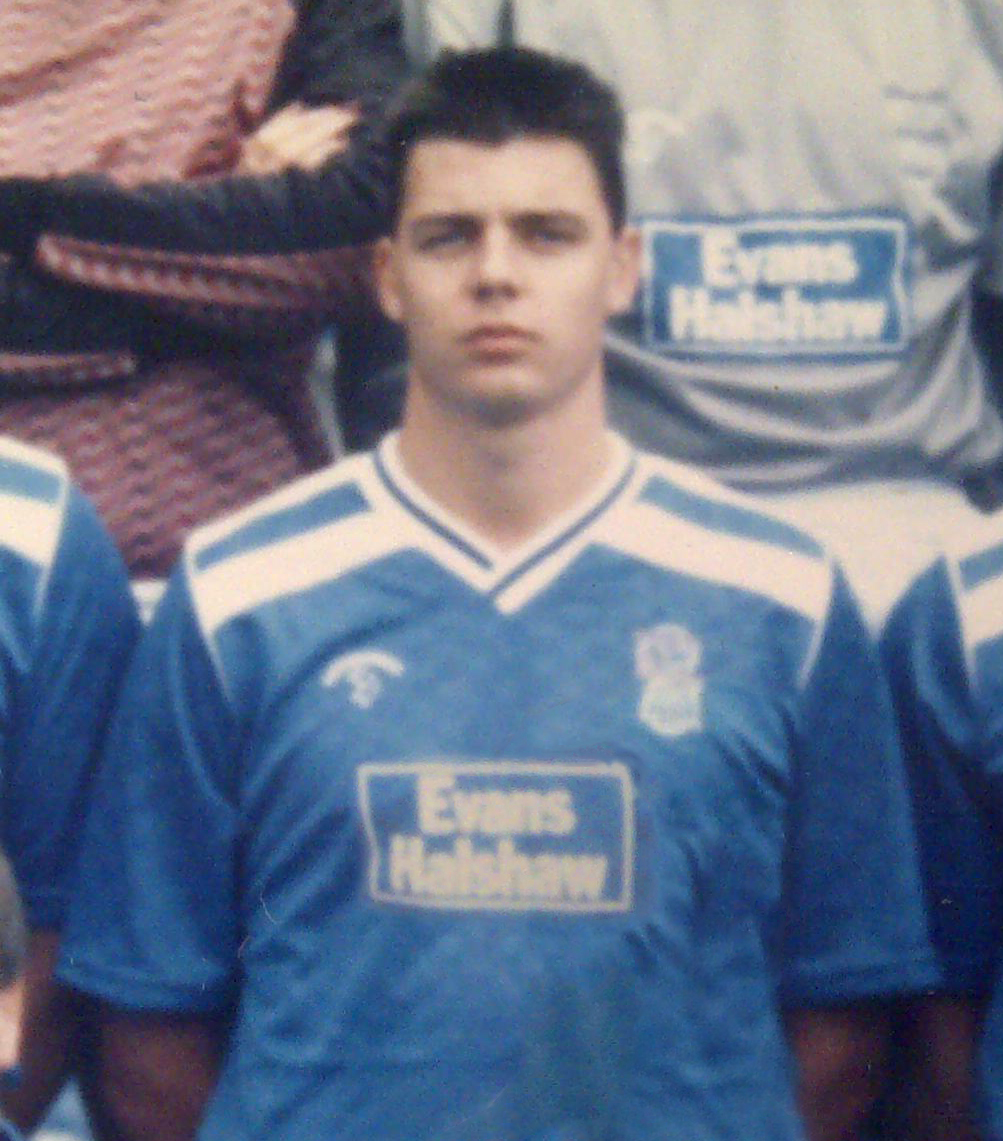
- Russell in Birmingham City kit

Personal information
- Full name: Guy Robert Russell
- Date of birth: 28 September 1967 (age 59)
- Place of birth: Shirley, England
- Position: Centre forward

Youth career
- Knowle North Star
- 1984–1985: Birmingham City

Senior career*
Years	Team	Apps	(Gls)
1985–1989	Birmingham City	11	(0)
1987	→ Carlisle United (loan)	12	(2)
1989	Kemin Palloseura	16	(5)
1989–2000	Moor Green	450	(135)
2000–2005	Solihull Borough		

Managerial career
- 2004–2005: Solihull Borough
- * Club domestic league appearances and goals

Guy Robert Russell (born 28 September 1967) is an English former professional footballer and manager who played in the Football League for Birmingham City and Carlisle United. He played as a centre forward.

== Life and career ==
Russell was born in Shirley, West Midlands. As a junior, he played for Knowle North Star before joining Birmingham City as a YTS trainee in 1984. He turned professional two years later. He made his debut as a 17-year-old, on 19 March 1985, playing 90 minutes as Des Bremner's deputy in a Second Division game at home to Manchester City which finished goalless. He made one substitute appearance in the following season in the First Division, and spent the latter part of the 1987–88 season on loan at Carlisle United, where his two goals from 12 games failed to prevent the club's relegation from the Third Division. Russell made another ten first-team appearances for Birmingham, but failed to score despite being a regular scorer in the junior teams, and in April 1989 he moved to Finland to play for Kemin Palloseura. Following their relegation, he returned to England and joined Moor Green of the Southern League.

Russell was to remain with Moor Green for eleven years, and captained the team. In April 1999, by which time he had 135 goals from 430 appearances in all competitions, he was awarded a testimonial match between a Birmingham City All-Stars team and their Middlesbrough counterparts. Manager Bob Faulkner later described him as "one of the Moor Green greats".

In 2000 Russell joined Solihull Borough as a player, later becoming assistant manager and in March 2004 taking over as manager. After nearly a year in post, Russell resigned, citing the time commitment and the frustration involved in managing a club unable to compete financially.
