= Billy Wright (footballer, born 1958) =

English footballer (born 1958)

Personal information
- Full name: William Wright
- Date of birth: 28 April 1958 (age 68)
- Place of birth: Liverpool, England
- Height: 5 ft 11 in (1.80 m)
- Position: Centre half

Youth career
- 1974–1977: Everton

Senior career*
Years	Team	Apps	(Gls)
1977–1983	Everton	166	(10)
1983–1986	Birmingham City	111	(8)
1986	→ Chester City (loan)	6	(1)
1986–1988	Carlisle United	87	(3)
1988	Morecambe	13	(1)
Total		383	(23)

International career
1978–1980	England U21	6	(0)
1979–1980	England B	2	(0)

Managerial career
- 1988–1989: Morecambe
- * Club domestic league appearances and goals

William Wright (born 28 April 1958) is an English former professional footballer who played as a centre half. He played 370 games in the Football League, appearing in all four divisions, and was capped six times at the under-21 level and twice for England B.

Born in Liverpool, Wright joined Everton as a junior. He went on to captain the side, and made nearly 200 first team appearances before losing his place to Kevin Ratcliffe. He then moved to Birmingham City on a free transfer. He missed only two games in all competitions in his first two seasons, was appointed captain and penalty-taker, and helped the club gain promotion back to the First Division in 1985. He was chosen as the club's Player of the Year for 1984–85. His form began to be affected by weight problems, and Birmingham released him the following year. This followed a spell out on loan with Chester City, whom he helped move towards promotion from the Fourth Division in the 1985–86 season.

He played two full seasons for Carlisle United before moving on to non-league club Morecambe. After injury put an end to his playing career in 1988, he became Morecambe's caretaker manager, and six games later, he was given the permanent appointment, though his tenure was only a few months.

== Honours ==
Birmingham City

- Second Division runner-up: 1984–85
