= Robert Hopkins (footballer) =

English footballer (1961–2026)

Personal information
- Full name: Robert Arthur Hopkins
- Date of birth: 25 October 1961
- Place of birth: Birmingham, England
- Date of death: 11 January 2026 (aged 64)
- Height: 5 ft 7 in (1.70 m)
- Position: Winger

Youth career
- 1977–1979: Aston Villa

Senior career*
Years	Team	Apps	(Gls)
1979–1983	Aston Villa	3	(1)
1983–1986	Birmingham City	123	(20)
1986–1987	Manchester City	7	(1)
1987–1989	West Bromwich Albion	83	(11)
1989–1991	Birmingham City	50	(9)
1991–1992	Shrewsbury Town	27	(3)
1992	Instant-Dict		
1993	Colchester United	14	(1)
1993–1999	Solihull Borough		
1999–????	Bromsgrove Rovers		
- * Club domestic league appearances and goals

Robert Arthur Hopkins (25 October 1961 – 11 January 2026) was an English professional footballer who played as a winger. In 2012, Hopkins was one of seven former players elected to Birmingham City's Hall of Fame.

He played in more than 300 Football League matches for Aston Villa, Birmingham City (in two spells), Manchester City, West Bromwich Albion, Shrewsbury Town and Colchester United. He also played in Hong Kong for Instant-Dict and for non-League clubs Solihull Borough and Bromsgrove Rovers.

== Career ==
Hopkins was born in the Hall Green district of Birmingham, and started his playing career at Aston Villa, with whom he won the FA Youth Cup in 1980. The 18-year-old made his debut under Ron Saunders in March 1980 in a 2–0 victory at home to Norwich, when he came on as a substitute and scored with his only touch in the game. On 9 Oct 1982, he made his final appearance in a 1–4 defeat to Notts County at Meadow Lane.

Hopkins gained notoriety at Villa for supposedly wearing a Birmingham City badge on his shirt. While at Birmingham, the club he supported from childhood, he helped the club to win promotion to the First Division in 1985 and the Associate Members' Cup in 1991. He also scored the decisive own goal in an embarrassing FA Cup defeat at home to non-league club Altrincham.

== Honours ==
Aston Villa

- FA Youth Cup: 1979–80
- Southern Junior Floodlit Cup: 1979–80

Birmingham City

- Football League Second Division runners-up: 1984–85
- Associate Members' Cup: 1990–91

Individual

- Birmingham City F.C. Hall of Fame: inducted 2012
