= Andy Kennedy (footballer, born 1964) =

Scottish footballer

Personal information
- Full name: Andrew John Kennedy
- Date of birth: 8 October 1964 (age 62)
- Place of birth: Stirling, Scotland
- Height: 6 ft 0 in (1.83 m)
- Position: Centre forward

Youth career
- Stirling Boys Club

Senior career*
Years	Team	Apps	(Gls)
1982–1985	Rangers	15	(3)
–	→ Seiko (Hong Kong) (loan)		
1985–1988	Birmingham City	76	(18)
1987	→ Sheffield United (loan)	9	(1)
1988–1990	Blackburn Rovers	59	(23)
1990–1992	Watford	25	(4)
1991	→ Bolton Wanderers (loan)	1	(0)
1992–1994	Brighton & Hove Albion	42	(10)
1994–1995	→ Gillingham	2	(0)
1995	Portadown	8	(3)
1995	Shelbourne	0	(0)
1995–1996	Sing Tao		
Total		237	(62)
- * Club domestic league appearances and goals

Andrew John Kennedy (born 8 October 1964) is a Scottish former professional footballer who played as a centre forward.

Kennedy started his career with Rangers, and after making around 20 first-team appearances he spent time at Seiko (Hong Kong) and was then transferred to Birmingham City in March 1985. His goals helped ensure the club's promotion from the Second Division, and in 1985–86, his first full season, he was the club's leading scorer, but with only nine goals for a side which failed to avoid relegation. In 1987, he joined Sheffield United on loan whilst recovering from injury, and then moved to Blackburn Rovers, where he scored 25 goals in two seasons, followed by Watford between 1990 and 1992. A loan spell at Division Three Bolton Wanderers was cut short after one game when Kennedy sustained a back injury. In 1992–93 he joined Division Two club Brighton & Hove Albion, spending two seasons there before finishing his Football League career at Gillingham. Still only 30 years of age, Kennedy moved to Hong Kong with Sing Tao before moving to Northern Ireland with Portadown.

From 2005 Kennedy coached within the Rangers Soccer Schools programme both at home and North America. He scouted and began the career of Cammy Palmer when he was playing at Whitby Bay Soccer Club.

== Honours ==
- with Birmingham City
  - Second Division promotion 1985.
