= Martin Kuhl =

English footballer (born 1965)

Personal information
- Full name: Martin Kuhl
- Date of birth: 10 January 1965 (age 61)
- Place of birth: Frimley, England
- Position: Midfielder

Youth career
- 1981–1983: Birmingham City

Senior career*
Years	Team	Apps	(Gls)
1983–1987	Birmingham City	111	(5)
1987–1988	Sheffield United	38	(4)
1988	Watford	4	(0)
1988–1992	Portsmouth	157	(27)
1992–1994	Derby County	68	(1)
1994	→ Notts County (loan)	2	(0)
1994–1997	Bristol City	94	(7)
1997–1999	Happy Valley (Hong Kong)		(3)
1999–2000	Farnborough Town	19	(2)
2000–2001	Carshalton Athletic	18	(0)
2001–2002	Aldershot Town	11	(1)
Total		522	(50)

Managerial career
- 2007: Aldershot Town (caretaker)
- 2015: Reading (interim)
- 2018–2019: Basingstoke Town
- 2019–2020: Staines Town
- * Club domestic league appearances and goals

Martin Kuhl (born 10 January 1965) is an English former professional footballer who played as a midfielder for many years in the Football League. He then went into coaching and was most recently manager of Staines Town until his departure in February 2020.

== Playing career ==
He made 474 appearances in the Football League for Birmingham City, Sheffield United, Watford, Portsmouth, Derby County, Notts County and Bristol City. He then played for Happy Valley in Hong Kong and represented the Hong Kong League in matches against Mexico and Bulgaria, before returning to play in non-League football. He helped Portsmouth reach the 1992 FA Cup semifinal, but was one of three Pompey players to miss his kick as they lost in a penalty shootout to Liverpool.

== Managerial career ==
Kuhl was assistant to manager Gary Waddock at Aldershot Town until October 2009, when the pair joined Wycombe Wanderers. He left the club in April 2011 after being suspended.

He went on to coach at youth level at Reading: his son, Aaron, came through the youth team at the club. On 4 December 2015, after Steve Clarke was sacked as manager, Kuhl was put in charge of Reading on an interim basis. Kuhl left Reading in September 2017.

Kuhl joined Torquay United as assistant to new head coach Gary Owers on 13 September 2017. He was appointed manager of Basingstoke Town in December 2018, and left by mutual consent in September 2019.

In December 2019, Kuhl was appointed manager of Staines Town, before leaving the club via mutual consent in February 2020.
