= Jim Hagan =

Northern Irish footballer and manager

Personal information
- Full name: James Hagan
- Date of birth: 10 August 1956 (age 70)
- Place of birth: Monkstown, Northern Ireland
- Height: 5 ft 10 in (1.78 m)
- Position: Defender

Senior career*
| Years | Team | Apps | (Gls) |
| 1974–1977 | Larne | | |
| 1977–1982 | Coventry City | 16 | (0) |
| 1979 | → Torquay United (loan) | 7 | (0) |
| 1980 | → Detroit Express (loan) | 30 | (0) |
| 1980–1981 | → Seiko (loan) | | |
| 1982–1987 | Birmingham City | 137 | (0) |
| 1987–1989 | Celta de Vigo | 74 | (0) |
| 1989 | Larne | 3 | (0) |
| 1989–1990 | Colchester United | 2 | (0) |
| 1990 | Larne | 5 | (0) |
| 1990–1991 | IK Oddevold | 25 | (0) |
| 1991–1994 | Ballymena United | 41 | (0) |
| 1994 | Carrick Rangers | 10 | (0) |
| 1994 | Larne | 16 | (0) |
| 1995 | Crusaders | 3 | (0) |
| 1995 | Coleraine | 2 | (0) |

Managerial career
- 1991–1994: Ballymena United
- 1994: Larne
- 2006: Larne
- * Club domestic league appearances and goals

James Hagan (born 10 August 1956) is a Northern Irish former professional footballer and football club manager.

== Career ==
Born in Monkstown, Hagan began his career in Northern Ireland with Larne and was voted Ulster young player of the year in the 1975–76 season. While playing for Larne he also worked as a booking clerk for the ferries between Larne and Stranraer in Scotland. His form with Larne earned him a call-up to Danny Blanchflower's Northern Ireland squad. However, although he played for Northern Ireland against Glentoran in a testimonial for Bobby McGregor in May 1977 he never made a full international appearance.

Hagan joined Coventry City from Larne in November 1977 for a fee of £25,000, making 13 league appearances the following season. He struggled to establish himself at Highfield Road and joined Torquay United on loan in September 1979 and was loaned to NASL side Detroit Express in March 1980. He joined Hong Kong side Seiko in October 1980 on an extended loan and helped the club to a clean-sweep of the Hong Kong League, Cup and Senior Cup. He returned to Coventry in July 1981, making three further league appearances and was included by Billy Bingham in Northern Ireland's provisional forty man squad for the 1982 World Cup Finals, but was cut when the final squad was announced.

Hagan was released by Coventry at the end of the 1981–82 season and in May 1982 joined local rivals Birmingham City. He quickly established himself in the first team and was a regular member of the sides both promoted to and relegated from the top flight over the next five years.

In 1987 Hagan joined newly promoted Spanish Primera Liga side Celta Vigo. At the end of his first season in Spain, Celta had finished in the top half of the table and Hagan was named Overseas Players of the Year, despite competition from the likes of Gary Lineker. Hagan returned to Larne in August 1989, moving to Colchester United in November 1989. He played only twice for the Layer Road side and returned to Larne from where he left to join Swedish side IK Oddevold in May 1990.

In May 1991 Hagan returned to Northern Ireland and was appointed as player-manager of Ballymena United. On leaving he played briefly for Carrick Rangers and had a short and unsuccessful spell in charge of Larne in 1994. He subsequently played for Crusaders before ending his playing career with Coleraine in December 1995.

By the 2000–01 season Hagan had become youth development officer at Sunderland. He subsequently returned to Larne as Youth Development Officer and became assistant manager under Kenny Shiels in October 2005. In May 2006, Hagan was appointed as manager. However, he was sacked in November 2006 with Larne struggling in the league.

He is manager of Larne amateur outfit Wellington Rec. They pulled off a major upset in August 2009 after beating Carrick Rangers 4–3 in the Steel and Sons Cup.

== Honours ==
=== Club ===
Seiko SA

- Hong Kong First Division League Winner (1): 1980–81
- Hong Kong Senior Challenge Shield Winner (1): 1980–81
- Hong Kong FA Cup Winner (1): 1980–81

Birmingham City

- Football League Second Division Runner-up (1): 1984–85

=== Individual ===
- Overseas Player of the Year (1): 1987–88 (Celta de Vigo)
