= Ian Handysides =

English footballer

Personal information
- Full name: Ian Robert Handysides
- Date of birth: 14 December 1962
- Place of birth: Jarrow, England
- Date of death: 17 August 1990 (aged 27)
- Place of death: Solihull, England
- Height: 5 ft 6 in (1.68 m)
- Position: Midfielder

Youth career
- 1978–1980: Birmingham City

Senior career*
Years	Team	Apps	(Gls)
1980–1984	Birmingham City	62	(2)
1984–1986	Walsall	66	(11)
1986–1988	Birmingham City	56	(4)
1986	→ Wolverhampton Wanderers (loan)	11	(2)

International career
1981	England Youth	5	(1)
- * Club domestic league appearances and goals

Ian Robert Handysides (14 December 1962 – 17 August 1990) was an English footballer.

Handysides was born in Jarrow. He began his footballing career when he joined Birmingham City on leaving school in 1979. A year later he made his first-team debut as a midfielder and by 1982 was a regular player in Birmingham's First Division side. By the turn of 1984, he had lost his place in the first team and was transferred to Walsall (in the Third Division) in hope of getting more first-team chances. He was a regular player for Walsall and within two years of joining, he returned to Birmingham.

In the autumn of 1986, Handysides was loaned out to Wolverhampton Wanderers and scored twice in 11 Fourth Division fixtures. On his return to Birmingham, he quickly re-established himself as a first-team regular and made 30 appearances in the 1987-88 Second Division campaign, scoring three goals, as he helped the club avoid relegation.

In the autumn of 1988, Handysides was diagnosed with a brain tumour. After a course of chemotherapy, he appeared to be recovering well, however this then spread to his spine and he died in Solihull on 17 August 1990, when still only 27 years old.
