= Tony Rees =

Welsh footballer

Personal information
- Full name: Anthony Andrew Rees
- Date of birth: 1 August 1964 (age 62)
- Place of birth: Merthyr Tydfil, Wales
- Height: 5 ft 9 in (1.75 m)
- Position: Forward

Youth career
- 1980–1982: Aston Villa

Senior career*
Years	Team	Apps	(Gls)
1982–1983	Aston Villa	0	(0)
1983–1988	Birmingham City	95	(12)
1985	→ Peterborough United (loan)	5	(2)
1986	→ Shrewsbury Town (loan)	2	(0)
1988–1989	Barnsley	31	(3)
1989–1994	Grimsby Town	141	(33)
1994–1996	West Bromwich Albion	23	(2)
–	Merthyr Tydfil		

International career
1983	Wales U21	1	(0)
1984	Wales	1	(0)
- * Club domestic league appearances and goals

Anthony Andrew Rees (born 1 August 1964) is a Welsh former professional footballer who played as a forward. As a youth he was part of the Aston Villa team which won the 1980 FA Youth Cup. He left Aston Villa without appearing for the first team, but went on to play nearly 300 games in the Football League, for Birmingham City, Peterborough United, Shrewsbury Town, Barnsley, Grimsby Town and West Bromwich Albion, appeared in all four divisions, and won one full cap for Wales.

== Honours ==
- with Aston Villa
  - FA Youth Cup winner 1980
- with Grimsby Town
  - Football League Fourth Division promotion 1990
  - Football League Third Division promotion 1991
