= 1980–81 Football League =

82nd season of the Football League

The Football League
- Season: 1980–81
- Champions: Aston Villa

The 1980–81 season was the 82nd completed season of The Football League. This was the final league season with two points for win.

Ron Saunders completed the revival of Birmingham club Aston Villa, as they won the First Division for the first time in 71 years. Villa competed in a two-horse race with Ipswich Town during the final stages of the season, eventually finishing four points ahead of the Suffolk side. Defending champions Liverpool slipped to fifth place, but compensated for this by winning the European Cup and their first League Cup. Manchester United failed to finish in the top five, a shortcoming that cost Dave Sexton his job as manager; he was succeeded by Ron Atkinson, who had finished fourth in the league and reached the UEFA Cup quarter-finals with an impressive West Bromwich Albion side – who would suffer a rapid decline after Atkinson's departure.

Crystal Palace endured a dreadful season with just six wins, all at home. They were joined in relegation to the Second Division by Norwich City and Leicester City.

FA Cup holders West Ham United returned to the First Division by becoming Second Division champions. Also promoted were Notts County and Swansea City, the Welsh club completing a meteoric rise under John Toshack by going from the Fourth Division to the First in just four years. Both Bristol clubs were relegated, along with Preston North End.

In the Third Division, Rotherham United were champions, with Barnsley and Charlton Athletic also promoted. Hull City, Blackpool and Colchester United were relegated, as were Sheffield United, who just seven years earlier had finished sixth in the First Division.

The Fourth Division saw Southend United finish as champions, with Lincoln City, Doncaster Rovers and Wimbledon occupying the other promotion places. There were no movements between the Fourth Division and the Alliance Premier League as the re-election system went in favour of the league's bottom four clubs.

== First Division ==
First Division
- Season: 1980–81
- Champions: Aston Villa; 7th English title
- Relegated: Norwich City; Leicester City; Crystal Palace
- European Cup: Aston Villa; Liverpool (as defending champions)
- European Cup Winners' Cup: Tottenham Hotspur
- UEFA Cup: Ipswich Town; Arsenal; West Bromwich Albion; Southampton
- Matches: 462
- Goals: 1,228 (2.66 per match)
- Top goalscorer: Peter Withe; Steve Archibald (20 goals each)
- Biggest home win: Nottingham Forest 5–0 Stoke City (30 August 1980); Manchester United 5–0 Leicester City (13 September 1980); Nottingham Forest 5–0 Leicester City (20 September 1980); Everton 5–0 Crystal Palace (20 September 1980); Middlesbrough 6–1 Norwich City (4 October 1980)
- Biggest away win: Coventry City 0–5 Everton (27 September 1980); Leeds United 0–5 Arsenal (8 November 1980)
- Highest scoring: Tottenham Hotspur 5–3 Ipswich Town (17 December 1980); Tottenham Hotspur 4–4 Southampton (26 December 1980)

Aston Villa came top of a hotly contested title race to clinch their first top division title since 1910, using only 14 players throughout the season, with only eight scorers. Runners-up Ipswich Town had compensation for their failed title challenge in the shape of a UEFA Cup triumph, and were also semi-finalists in the FA Cup, their relatively small squad struggling in the final weeks of the season as a challenge for three major trophies took its toll. Arsenal finished third, while West Bromwich Albion enjoyed another strong season and finished fourth. Liverpool finished fifth but won their third European Cup and their first League Cup.

Manchester United's failure to finish higher than eighth in the league cost manager Dave Sexton his job after four trophyless seasons in charge, and a lengthy search for a new manager saw West Bromwich Albion's Ron Atkinson named as his successor. Everton appointed their former player Howard Kendall as manager after a disappointing 15th-place finish. Tottenham, meanwhile, only finished 10th in the league but achieved a sixth triumph in the FA Cup at the expense of Manchester City, who climbed up to 12th place in the league after an upturn in fortunes brought about the October change of manager from Malcolm Allison to John Bond.

Bond's former club Norwich City went down to the Second Division along with Leicester City and Crystal Palace.

=== Final table ===
Pos	Team	Pld	W	D	L	GF	GA	GD	Pts	Qualification or relegation
1	Aston Villa (C)	42	26	8	8	72	40	+32	60	Qualification for the European Cup first round
2	Ipswich Town	42	23	10	9	77	43	+34	56	Qualification for the UEFA Cup first round
3	Arsenal	42	19	15	8	61	45	+16	53	Qualification for the UEFA Cup first round
4	West Bromwich Albion	42	20	12	10	60	42	+18	52	Qualification for the UEFA Cup first round
5	Liverpool	42	17	17	8	62	42	+20	51	Qualification for the European Cup first round (Note: Liverpool qualified for the European Cup first round as the 1980–81 European Cup winners.)
6	Southampton	42	20	10	12	76	56	+20	50	Qualification for the UEFA Cup first round
7	Nottingham Forest	42	19	12	11	62	44	+18	50	
8	Manchester United	42	15	18	9	51	36	+15	48	
9	Leeds United	42	17	10	15	39	47	−8	44	
10	Tottenham Hotspur	42	14	15	13	70	68	+2	43	Qualification for the European Cup Winners' Cup first round (Note: Tottenham Hotspur qualified for the European Cup Winners' Cup first round as the 1980–81 FA Cup winners.)
11	Stoke City	42	12	18	12	51	60	−9	42	
12	Manchester City	42	14	11	17	56	59	−3	39	
13	Birmingham City	42	13	12	17	50	61	−11	38	
14	Middlesbrough	42	16	5	21	53	61	−8	37	
15	Everton	42	13	10	19	55	58	−3	36	
16	Coventry City	42	13	10	19	48	68	−20	36	
17	Sunderland	42	14	7	21	52	53	−1	35	
18	Wolverhampton Wanderers	42	13	9	20	43	55	−12	35	
19	Brighton & Hove Albion	42	14	7	21	54	67	−13	35	
20	Norwich City (R)	42	13	7	22	49	73	−24	33	Relegation to the Second Division
21	Leicester City (R)	42	13	6	23	40	67	−27	32	Relegation to the Second Division
22	Crystal Palace (R)	42	6	7	29	47	83	−36	19	Relegation to the Second Division

Source: World Football
Rules for classification: 1) Points; 2) Goal difference; 3) Goals scored
(C) Champions; (R) Relegated

=== Results ===
Home \ Away	ARS	AST	BIR	BHA	COV	CRY	EVE	IPS	LEE	LEI	LIV	MCI	MUN	MID	NWC	NOT	SOU	STK	SUN	TOT	WBA	WOL
Arsenal		2–0	2–1	2–0	2–2	3–2	2–1	1–1	0–0	1–0	1–0	2–0	2–1	2–2	3–1	1–0	1–1	2–0	2–2	2–0	2–2	1–1
Aston Villa	1–1		3–0	4–1	1–0	2–1	0–2	1–2	1–1	2–0	2–0	1–0	3–3	3–0	1–0	2–0	2–1	1–0	4–0	3–0	1–0	2–1
Birmingham City	3–1	1–2		2–1	3–1	1–0	1–1	1–3	0–2	1–2	1–1	2–0	0–0	2–1	4–0	2–0	0–3	1–1	3–2	2–1	1–1	1–0
Brighton & Hove Albion	0–1	1–0	2–2		4–1	3–2	1–3	1–0	2–0	2–1	2–2	1–2	1–4	0–1	2–0	0–1	2–0	1–1	2–1	0–2	1–2	2–0
Coventry City	3–1	1–2	2–1	3–3		3–1	0–5	0–4	2–1	4–1	0–0	1–1	0–2	1–0	0–1	1–1	1–0	2–2	2–1	0–1	3–0	2–2
Crystal Palace	2–2	0–1	3–1	0–3	0–3		2–3	1–2	0–1	2–1	2–2	2–3	1–0	5–2	4–1	1–3	3–2	1–1	0–1	3–4	0–1	0–0
Everton	1–2	1–3	1–1	4–3	3–0	5–0		0–0	1–2	1–0	2–2	0–2	0–1	4–1	0–2	0–0	2–1	0–1	2–1	2–2	1–1	2–0
Ipswich Town	0–2	1–0	5–1	2–0	2–0	3–2	4–0		1–1	3–1	1–1	1–0	1–1	1–0	2–0	2–0	2–3	4–0	4–1	3–0	0–0	3–1
Leeds United	0–5	1–2	0–0	1–0	3–0	1–0	1–0	3–0		1–2	0–0	1–0	0–0	2–1	1–0	1–0	0–3	1–3	1–0	0–0	0–0	1–3
Leicester City	1–0	2–4	1–0	0–1	1–3	1–1	0–1	0–1	0–1		2–0	1–1	1–0	1–0	1–2	1–1	2–2	1–1	0–1	2–1	0–2	2–0
Liverpool	1–1	2–1	2–2	4–1	2–1	3–0	1–0	1–1	0–0	1–2		1–0	0–1	4–2	4–1	0–0	2–0	3–0	0–1	2–1	4–0	1–0
Manchester City	1–1	2–2	0–1	1–1	3–0	1–1	3–1	1–1	1–0	3–3	0–3		1–0	3–2	1–0	1–1	3–0	1–2	0–4	3–1	2–1	4–0
Manchester United	0–0	3–3	2–0	2–1	0–0	1–0	2–0	2–1	0–1	5–0	0–0	2–2		3–0	1–0	1–1	1–1	2–2	1–1	0–0	2–1	0–0
Middlesbrough	2–1	2–1	1–2	1–0	0–1	2–0	1–0	2–1	3–0	1–0	1–2	2–2	1–1		6–1	0–0	1–1	3–1	1–0	4–1	2–1	2–0
Norwich City	1–1	1–3	2–2	3–1	2–0	1–1	2–1	1–0	2–3	2–3	0–1	2–0	2–2	2–0		1–1	1–0	5–1	1–0	2–2	0–2	1–1
Nottingham Forest	3–1	2–2	2–1	4–1	1–1	3–0	1–0	1–2	2–1	5–0	0–0	3–2	1–2	1–0	2–1		2–1	5–0	3–1	0–3	2–1	1–0
Southampton	3–1	1–2	3–1	3–1	1–0	4–2	3–0	3–3	2–1	4–0	2–2	2–0	1–0	1–0	2–1	2–0		1–2	2–1	1–1	2–2	4–2
Stoke City	1–1	1–1	0–0	0–0	2–2	1–0	2–2	2–2	3–0	1–0	2–2	2–1	1–2	1–0	3–1	1–2	1–2		2–0	2–3	0–0	3–2
Sunderland	2–0	1–2	3–0	1–2	3–0	1–0	3–1	0–2	4–1	1–0	2–4	2–0	2–0	0–1	3–0	2–2	1–2	0–0		1–1	0–0	0–1
Tottenham Hotspur	2–0	2–0	1–0	2–2	4–1	4–2	2–2	5–3	1–1	1–2	1–1	2–1	0–0	3–2	2–3	2–0	4–4	2–2	0–0		2–3	2–2
West Bromwich Albion	0–1	0–0	2–2	2–0	1–0	1–0	2–0	3–1	1–2	3–1	2–0	3–1	3–1	3–0	3–0	2–1	2–1	0–0	2–1	4–2		1–1
Wolverhampton Wanderers	1–2	0–1	1–0	0–2	0–1	2–0	0–0	0–2	2–1	0–1	4–1	1–3	1–0	3–0	3–0	1–4	1–1	1–0	2–1	1–0	2–0	

Updated to match(es) played on unknown. Source: Soccerbase
Legend: Blue = home team win; Yellow = draw; Red = away team win.

=== Managerial changes ===
Team	Outgoing manager	Manner of departure	Date of vacancy	Position in table	Incoming manager	Date of appointment
Leeds United	(England) Jimmy Adamson	Resigned	7 September 1980	21st	(England) Maurice Lindley (caretaker)	7 September 1980
Leeds United	(England) Maurice Lindley	End of caretaker spell	16 September 1980	21st	(England) Allan Clarke	16 September 1980
Crystal Palace	(England) Terry Venables	Signed by Queens Park Rangers	3 October 1980	22nd	(Wales) Ernie Walley (caretaker)	3 October 1980
Manchester City	(England) Malcolm Allison	Sacked	8 October 1980	21st	(England) John Bond	17 October 1980
Norwich City	(England) John Bond	Signed by Manchester City	17 October 1980	20th	(England) Ken Brown	17 October 1980
Crystal Palace	(Wales) Ernie Walley	End of caretaker spell	5 December 1980	21st	(England) Malcolm Allison	5 December 1980
Crystal Palace	(England) Malcolm Allison	Sacked	1 February 1981	22nd	(England) Dario Gradi	3 February 1981
Sunderland	(England) Ken Knighton	Sacked	1 April 1981	15th	(Scotland) Mick Docherty (caretaker)	1 April 1981
Manchester United	(England) Dave Sexton	Sacked	30 April 1981	8th	(England) Jack Crompton (caretaker)	30 April 1981

=== Maps ===
Locations of the Football League First Division 1980–1981 teams
Locations of the Football League First Division London teams 1980–1981

== Second Division ==
Second Division
- Season: 1980–81
- Champions: West Ham United
- Promoted: West Ham United; Notts County; Swansea City
- Relegated: Preston North End; Bristol City; Bristol Rovers
- Matches: 462
- Goals: 1,073 (2.32 per match)
- Top goalscorer: David Cross (22 goals)
- Biggest home win: Chelsea 6–0 Newcastle United (25 October 1980)
- Biggest away win: Wrexham 0–4 Chelsea (15 November 1980); Grimsby Town 1–5 West Ham United (11 April 1981)
- Highest scoring: Bolton Wanderers 6–1 Cambridge United (1 November 1980)

A year after winning the FA Cup, West Ham ended their three-year exile from the First Division by clinching the Second Division title. Notts County, who finished second, went up after 55 years away from the First Division. Third placed Swansea City completed an unprecedented four-season climb from the Fourth Division to the First Division, where they had never previously played. Blackburn Rovers missed out on promotion on goal difference, and then lost their promising young player-manager Howard Kendall to Everton.

Both Bristol clubs went down along with Preston North End.

Pos	Team	Pld	W	D	L	GF	GA	GD	Pts	Qualification or relegation
1	West Ham United (C, P)	42	28	10	4	79	29	+50	66	Promotion to the First Division
2	Notts County (P)	42	18	17	7	49	38	+11	53	Promotion to the First Division
3	Swansea City (P)	42	18	14	10	64	44	+20	50	Cup Winners' Cup first round and promotion to the First Division
4	Blackburn Rovers	42	16	18	8	42	29	+13	50	
5	Luton Town	42	18	12	12	61	46	+15	48	
6	Derby County	42	15	15	12	57	52	+5	45	
7	Grimsby Town	42	15	15	12	44	42	+2	45	
8	Queens Park Rangers	42	15	13	14	56	46	+10	43	
9	Watford	42	16	11	15	50	45	+5	43	
10	Sheffield Wednesday	42	17	8	17	53	51	+2	42	
11	Newcastle United	42	14	14	14	30	45	−15	42	
12	Chelsea	42	14	12	16	46	41	+5	40	
13	Cambridge United	42	17	6	19	53	65	−12	40	
14	Shrewsbury Town	42	11	17	14	46	47	−1	39	
15	Oldham Athletic	42	12	15	15	39	48	−9	39	
16	Wrexham	42	12	14	16	43	45	−2	38	
17	Orient	42	13	12	17	52	56	−4	38	
18	Bolton Wanderers	42	14	10	18	61	66	−5	38	
19	Cardiff City	42	12	12	18	44	60	−16	36	
20	Preston North End (R)	42	11	14	17	41	62	−21	36	Relegation to the Third Division
21	Bristol City (R)	42	7	16	19	29	51	−22	30	Relegation to the Third Division
22	Bristol Rovers (R)	42	5	13	24	34	65	−31	23	Relegation to the Third Division

Rules for classification: 1) Points; 2) Goal difference; 3) Goals scored
(C) Champions; (P) Promoted; (R) Relegated

=== Results ===
Home \ Away	BLB	BOL	BRI	BRR	CAM	CAR	CHE	DER	GRI	LUT	NEW	NTC	OLD	ORI	PNE	QPR	SHW	SHR	SWA	WAT	WHU	WRE
Blackburn Rovers		0–0	1–0	2–0	2–0	2–3	1–1	1–0	2–0	3–0	3–0	0–0	1–0	2–0	0–0	2–1	3–1	2–0	0–0	0–0	0–0	1–1
Bolton Wanderers	1–2		1–1	2–0	6–1	4–2	2–3	3–1	1–1	0–3	4–0	3–0	2–0	3–1	2–1	1–2	0–0	0–2	1–4	2–1	1–1	1–1
Bristol City	2–0	3–1		0–0	0–1	0–0	0–0	2–2	1–1	2–1	2–0	0–1	1–1	3–1	0–0	0–1	1–0	1–1	0–1	0–0	1–1	0–2
Bristol Rovers	0–1	2–1	0–0		0–1	0–1	1–0	1–1	2–2	2–4	0–0	1–1	0–0	1–1	2–0	1–2	3–3	1–1	1–2	3–1	0–1	0–1
Cambridge United	0–0	2–3	2–1	1–3		2–0	0–1	3–0	5–1	1–3	2–1	1–2	3–1	1–0	1–0	1–0	0–2	3–1	3–1	3–1	1–2	1–0
Cardiff City	1–2	1–1	2–3	2–1	1–2		0–1	0–0	1–1	1–0	1–0	0–1	0–2	4–2	1–3	1–0	0–0	2–2	3–3	1–0	0–0	1–0
Chelsea	0–0	2–0	0–0	2–0	3–0	0–1		1–3	3–0	0–2	6–0	0–2	1–0	0–1	1–1	1–1	2–0	3–0	0–0	0–1	0–1	2–2
Derby County	2–2	1–0	1–0	2–1	0–3	1–1	3–2		2–1	2–2	2–0	2–2	4–1	1–1	1–2	3–3	3–1	1–1	0–1	1–1	2–0	0–1
Grimsby Town	0–0	4–0	1–0	2–0	3–1	0–1	2–0	0–1		0–0	0–0	2–1	0–0	2–0	0–0	0–0	0–0	1–0	1–0	1–1	1–5	1–0
Luton Town	3–1	2–2	3–1	1–0	0–0	2–2	2–0	1–2	0–2		0–1	0–1	1–2	2–1	4–2	3–0	3–0	1–1	2–2	1–0	3–2	1–1
Newcastle United	0–0	2–1	0–0	0–0	2–1	2–1	1–0	0–2	1–1	2–1		1–1	0–0	3–1	2–0	1–0	1–0	1–0	1–2	2–1	0–0	0–1
Notts County	2–0	2–1	2–1	3–1	2–0	4–2	1–1	0–0	0–0	0–1	0–0		0–2	1–0	0–0	2–1	2–0	0–0	2–1	1–2	1–1	1–1
Oldham Athletic	1–0	1–1	2–0	1–0	2–2	2–0	0–0	0–2	1–2	0–0	0–0	0–1		0–1	1–1	1–0	2–0	0–0	2–2	2–1	0–0	1–3
Orient	1–1	2–2	3–1	2–2	3–0	2–2	0–1	1–0	2–0	0–0	1–1	0–2	2–3		4–0	4–0	2–0	1–0	1–1	1–1	0–2	2–1
Preston North End	0–0	1–2	1–1	0–0	2–0	3–1	1–0	0–3	2–4	1–0	2–3	2–2	1–2	3–0		3–2	2–1	0–0	1–3	2–1	0–0	1–1
Queens Park Rangers	1–1	3–1	4–0	4–0	5–0	2–0	1–0	3–1	1–0	3–2	1–2	1–1	2–0	0–0	1–1		1–2	0–0	0–0	0–0	3–0	0–1
Sheffield Wednesday	2–1	2–0	2–1	4–1	4–1	2–0	0–0	0–0	1–2	3–1	2–0	1–2	3–0	2–2	3–0	1–0		1–1	2–0	1–0	0–1	2–1
Shrewsbury Town	1–1	1–2	4–0	3–1	2–1	2–0	2–2	1–0	1–0	0–1	1–0	1–1	2–2	1–2	3–0	3–3	2–0		0–0	2–1	0–2	1–2
Swansea City	2–0	3–0	0–0	2–1	1–1	1–1	3–0	3–1	1–0	2–2	4–0	1–1	3–0	0–2	3–0	1–2	2–3	2–1		1–0	1–3	3–1
Watford	1–1	3–1	1–0	3–1	0–0	4–2	2–3	1–1	3–1	0–1	0–0	2–0	2–1	2–0	2–1	1–1	2–1	1–0	2–1		1–2	1–0
West Ham United	2–0	2–1	5–0	2–0	4–2	1–0	4–0	3–1	2–1	1–2	1–0	4–0	1–1	2–1	5–0	3–0	2–1	3–0	2–0	3–2		1–0
Wrexham	0–1	0–1	1–0	3–1	0–0	0–1	0–4	2–2	0–2	0–0	0–0	1–1	3–2	3–1	0–1	1–1	4–0	1–2	1–1	0–1	2–2	

Updated to match(es) played on unknown. Source: Soccerbase
Legend: Blue = home team win; Yellow = draw; Red = away team win.

=== Maps ===
Locations of the Football League Second Division London teams 1980–1981
Locations of the Football League Second Division 1980–1981 teams

== Third Division ==
Football League Third Division
- Season: 1980–81
- Champions: Rotherham United (1st title)
- Promoted: Barnsley; Charlton Athletic
- Relegated: Blackpool; Colchester United; Hull City; Sheffield United
- Matches: 552
- Goals: 1,337 (2.42 per match)
- Top goalscorer: Tony Kellow (Exeter City), 25

Pos	Team	Pld	W	D	L	GF	GA	GD	Pts	Promotion or relegation
1	Rotherham United (C, P)	46	24	13	9	62	32	+30	61	Promotion to the Second Division
2	Barnsley (P)	46	21	17	8	72	45	+27	59	Promotion to the Second Division
3	Charlton Athletic (P)	46	25	9	12	63	44	+19	59	Promotion to the Second Division
4	Huddersfield Town	46	21	14	11	71	40	+31	56	
5	Chesterfield	46	23	10	13	72	48	+24	56	
6	Portsmouth	46	22	9	15	55	47	+8	53	
7	Plymouth Argyle	46	19	14	13	56	44	+12	52	
8	Burnley	46	18	14	14	60	48	+12	50	
9	Brentford	46	14	19	13	52	49	+3	47	
10	Reading	46	18	10	18	62	62	0	46	
11	Exeter City	46	16	13	17	62	66	−4	45	
12	Newport County	46	15	13	18	64	61	+3	43	
13	Fulham	46	15	13	18	57	64	−7	43	
14	Oxford United	46	13	17	16	39	47	−8	43	
15	Gillingham	46	12	18	16	48	58	−10	42	
16	Millwall	46	14	14	18	43	60	−17	42	
17	Swindon Town	46	13	15	18	51	56	−5	41	
18	Chester	46	15	11	20	38	48	−10	41	
19	Carlisle United	46	14	13	19	56	70	−14	41	
20	Walsall	46	13	15	18	59	74	−15	41	
21	Sheffield United (R)	46	14	12	20	65	63	+2	40	Relegation to the Fourth Division
22	Colchester United (R)	46	14	11	21	45	65	−20	39	Relegation to the Fourth Division
23	Blackpool (R)	46	9	14	23	45	75	−30	32	Relegation to the Fourth Division
24	Hull City (R)	46	8	16	22	40	71	−31	32	Relegation to the Fourth Division

Source: rsssf.com
(C) Champions; (P) Promoted; (R) Relegated

=== Results ===
Home \ Away	BAR	BLP	BRE	BUR	CRL	CHA	CHE	CHF	COL	EXE	FUL	GIL	HUD	HUL	MIL	NPC	OXF	PLY	POR	REA	ROT	SHU	SWI	WAL
Barnsley		2–0	0–1	3–2	3–1	0–0	2–0	1–1	3–0	1–0	2–2	3–3	1–0	5–0	2–0	4–1	1–1	2–1	1–2	2–3	1–0	2–1	2–0	3–0
Blackpool	1–0		0–3	0–0	0–1	0–2	2–3	0–3	1–1	0–0	0–2	4–0	1–2	2–2	0–0	2–4	1–1	1–0	0–2	0–0	0–0	2–1	1–1	1–0
Brentford	1–1	2–0		0–0	1–1	0–1	0–1	3–2	2–1	0–1	1–3	3–3	0–0	2–2	1–0	0–1	3–0	0–1	2–2	1–2	2–1	1–1	1–1	4–0
Burnley	0–1	4–1	2–0		0–3	0–1	1–0	1–0	1–0	1–0	3–0	3–2	4–2	2–0	5–0	1–1	1–1	2–1	1–3	1–2	1–1	3–2	0–0	0–0
Carlisle United	2–2	2–0	1–2	3–2		1–2	3–0	2–6	4–0	1–1	2–2	0–0	1–1	2–0	2–1	1–4	0–0	2–0	0–0	0–0	0–1	0–3	2–1	1–1
Charlton Athletic	1–1	2–1	3–1	2–0	2–1		1–0	1–0	1–2	1–0	1–1	2–1	1–2	3–2	0–0	3–0	0–0	1–1	1–2	4–2	2–0	2–0	0–0	2–0
Chester	2–2	2–1	0–0	0–0	1–0	4–0		2–1	0–0	1–0	0–1	1–2	0–2	4–1	0–1	1–1	0–1	1–0	0–1	1–0	0–1	3–2	1–0	1–0
Chesterfield	0–0	3–2	2–1	3–0	1–0	0–1	2–0		3–0	1–0	0–0	2–0	2–1	1–0	3–0	3–2	2–1	2–2	3–0	3–2	2–0	1–0	2–2	1–2
Colchester United	2–2	3–2	0–2	2–1	1–0	2–0	1–1	1–1		1–2	3–2	2–1	1–2	2–0	3–0	1–0	3–0	2–2	1–0	1–2	0–0	1–1	1–0	1–1
Exeter City	0–1	0–0	0–0	0–0	2–0	4–3	2–2	2–2	4–0		1–0	2–1	1–4	1–3	2–0	2–2	1–1	1–1	2–0	3–1	2–1	1–1	3–4	0–3
Fulham	2–3	1–2	1–1	0–2	2–3	1–0	0–1	1–1	1–0	0–1		3–2	2–2	0–0	1–1	2–1	0–4	0–0	3–0	1–2	1–1	2–1	2–0	2–1
Gillingham	1–1	3–1	2–0	0–0	0–1	0–1	2–1	1–0	0–0	1–5	1–0		0–0	2–0	1–2	3–2	1–1	0–1	0–1	2–0	0–0	2–2	0–0	1–0
Huddersfield Town	1–0	1–1	3–0	0–0	1–1	0–1	0–0	2–0	2–0	5–0	4–2	1–0		5–0	0–1	1–4	2–0	2–0	0–0	4–1	1–0	1–0	0–2	1–1
Hull City	1–2	2–1	0–0	0–0	0–1	0–2	0–0	0–0	0–1	3–3	0–1	2–2	2–1		3–1	3–1	0–1	1–0	2–1	2–0	1–2	1–1	0–0	0–1
Millwall	1–1	0–0	2–2	2–2	3–0	2–0	1–0	0–2	3–1	1–0	3–1	0–0	2–1	1–1		0–0	2–1	1–1	0–0	2–1	0–1	1–4	3–1	0–1
Newport County	0–0	3–1	1–1	1–2	4–0	1–2	1–1	5–1	1–0	2–1	2–1	1–1	3–2	4–0	2–1		0–1	0–2	2–1	0–0	0–1	4–0	0–2	1–1
Oxford United	1–1	0–2	1–1	0–2	1–2	1–0	1–0	0–3	2–1	1–2	2–0	1–1	0–2	1–1	1–0	0–1		0–0	1–2	2–1	1–1	2–0	0–0	1–1
Plymouth Argyle	1–3	0–2	0–1	2–1	4–1	1–1	2–0	1–0	1–1	0–2	2–1	4–1	0–0	0–0	2–0	3–2	3–0		1–0	2–1	3–1	1–0	0–0	2–0
Portsmouth	0–1	3–3	0–2	4–2	2–1	1–0	2–0	1–0	2–1	5–0	1–0	0–0	1–2	2–1	2–1	0–0	1–1	1–3		0–0	3–1	1–0	1–0	2–0
Reading	3–2	3–0	0–0	1–3	3–1	1–3	3–0	2–3	1–0	2–1	0–0	0–1	2–1	2–0	4–1	1–1	0–1	1–1	2–1		1–1	1–0	4–1	2–0
Rotherham United	2–0	4–0	4–1	1–0	3–0	3–0	0–0	0–0	2–0	3–1	2–2	2–0	0–0	1–1	3–0	1–0	0–0	2–1	3–0	2–0		2–1	1–0	2–1
Sheffield United	1–1	4–2	0–0	0–0	2–2	3–2	2–0	2–0	3–0	3–1	1–2	0–1	2–2	3–1	2–3	2–0	1–0	0–0	1–0	2–0	1–2		3–0	0–1
Swindon Town	2–0	1–2	0–0	0–3	1–1	0–3	1–2	0–1	3–0	2–2	3–4	0–0	1–0	3–1	0–0	1–1	1–0	3–0	0–2	3–1	2–1	5–2		3–1
Walsall	1–1	2–2	2–3	3–1	4–3	2–2	2–1	4–3	3–1	1–3	1–2	3–3	2–2	1–1	0–0	1–0	0–3	1–3	2–0	2–2	0–2	4–4	2–1	

Updated to match(es) played on unknown. Source: Soccerbase
Legend: Blue = home team win; Yellow = draw; Red = away team win.

=== Maps ===
Locations of the Football League Third Division London teams 1980–1981
Locations of the Football League Third Division teams 1980–1981

== Fourth Division ==
Football League Fourth Division
- Season: 1980–81
- Champions: Southend United (1st title)
- Promoted: Lincoln City; Doncaster Rovers; Wimbledon
- Failed re-election: None
- Matches: 552
- Goals: 1,364 (2.47 per match)
- Top goalscorer: Alan Cork (Wimbledon), 23

Pos	Team	Pld	W	D	L	GF	GA	GD	Pts	Promotion
1	Southend United (C, P)	46	30	7	9	79	31	+48	67	Promotion to the Third Division
2	Lincoln City (P)	46	25	15	6	66	25	+41	65	Promotion to the Third Division
3	Doncaster Rovers (P)	46	22	12	12	59	49	+10	56	Promotion to the Third Division
4	Wimbledon (P)	46	23	9	14	64	46	+18	55	Promotion to the Third Division
5	Peterborough United	46	17	18	11	68	54	+14	52	
6	Aldershot	46	18	14	14	43	41	+2	50	
7	Mansfield Town	46	20	9	17	58	44	+14	49	
8	Darlington	46	19	11	16	65	59	+6	49	
9	Hartlepool United	46	20	9	17	64	61	+3	49	
10	Northampton Town	46	18	13	15	65	67	−2	49	
11	Wigan Athletic	46	18	11	17	51	55	−4	47	
12	Bury	46	17	11	18	70	62	+8	45	
13	Bournemouth	46	16	13	17	47	48	−1	45	
14	Bradford City	46	14	16	16	53	60	−7	44	
15	Rochdale	46	14	15	17	60	70	−10	43	
16	Scunthorpe United	46	11	20	15	60	69	−9	42	
17	Torquay United	46	18	5	23	55	63	−8	41	
18	Crewe Alexandra	46	13	14	19	48	61	−13	40	
19	Port Vale	46	12	15	19	57	70	−13	39	
20	Stockport County	46	16	7	23	44	57	−13	39	
21	Tranmere Rovers	46	13	10	23	59	73	−14	36	Re-elected
22	Hereford United	46	11	13	22	38	62	−24	35	Re-elected
23	Halifax Town	46	11	12	23	44	71	−27	34	Re-elected
24	York City	46	12	9	25	47	66	−19	33	Re-elected

(C) Champions; (P) Promoted

=== Results ===
Home \ Away	ALD	BOU	BRA	BRY	CRE	DAR	DON	HAL	HAR	HER	LIN	MAN	NOR	PET	PTV	ROC	SCU	STD	STP	TOR	TRA	WIG	WDN	YOR
Aldershot		0–0	1–1	1–0	2–0	2–1	1–0	2–1	2–1	4–0	0–0	1–0	0–0	0–0	0–0	0–0	0–0	1–2	3–0	2–1	3–2	0–1	2–0	1–1
Bournemouth	0–2		4–0	2–2	0–0	3–3	1–2	2–1	1–0	1–0	0–1	0–1	0–0	4–1	0–0	2–1	2–2	2–1	0–1	1–1	1–0	3–0	0–1	1–1
Bradford City	1–0	1–1		0–2	2–2	3–0	1–1	0–0	2–0	0–1	1–2	0–2	3–1	1–1	2–1	2–1	0–0	2–1	1–1	2–0	0–3	3–3	2–0	1–1
Bury	0–0	3–0	2–2		1–3	1–2	2–0	0–0	0–0	2–1	1–1	4–1	1–2	1–1	2–1	3–1	6–1	1–2	0–1	3–0	2–2	0–0	1–0	2–0
Crewe Alexandra	0–0	0–2	1–0	2–2		1–1	0–0	2–1	2–0	5–0	0–3	1–2	3–1	1–0	0–0	1–0	1–0	1–1	2–0	0–1	3–0	1–2	0–3	1–1
Darlington	1–2	1–2	2–1	2–1	2–1		5–0	3–1	3–0	2–1	0–0	2–2	1–0	2–0	1–1	4–4	0–1	0–2	2–2	1–0	2–0	3–1	4–1	0–0
Doncaster Rovers	1–0	2–1	2–0	1–0	1–1	2–0		0–0	1–2	5–1	0–1	2–1	1–1	0–4	2–0	1–2	1–0	1–0	2–1	2–0	1–0	1–1	2–1	3–2
Halifax Town	1–0	1–2	2–0	4–2	1–0	1–2	0–3		1–2	0–0	1–3	0–2	0–1	2–3	2–2	2–0	1–0	1–5	2–0	2–1	1–1	0–1	0–1	3–1
Hartlepool	1–0	1–0	2–2	1–2	6–2	2–0	1–0	3–0		2–0	2–0	0–1	2–3	1–1	3–0	2–2	2–0	1–3	1–0	0–2	3–0	3–1	2–3	1–0
Hereford United	0–0	1–0	4–0	0–1	0–0	0–1	1–3	0–1	3–0		0–2	2–1	4–1	1–1	2–3	3–0	2–1	0–0	2–0	0–1	1–1	1–1	1–1	1–1
Lincoln City	0–1	2–0	1–1	2–1	2–1	1–0	1–1	3–0	2–0	1–0		1–1	8–0	1–1	1–0	3–0	2–2	2–1	1–0	5–0	2–0	2–0	0–0	1–1
Mansfield Town	1–2	1–1	1–0	2–0	4–1	1–0	1–1	0–1	0–1	4–0	2–0		2–0	2–1	5–0	2–2	1–0	0–1	1–0	1–1	1–1	3–1	1–0	0–1
Northampton Town	2–0	0–1	0–1	5–3	4–1	2–2	0–2	2–1	3–1	0–0	1–1	0–1		2–2	5–1	3–2	3–3	2–0	0–1	1–0	3–1	1–1	1–1	2–0
Peterborough United	0–0	1–0	2–2	2–0	2–1	1–0	0–1	2–2	1–1	3–0	1–0	1–0	3–0		1–1	2–2	0–2	5–2	1–2	1–3	4–1	0–0	1–1	3–0
Port Vale	0–1	0–2	2–1	1–3	2–2	4–2	3–0	0–0	1–1	4–0	0–1	0–0	1–1	1–1		1–1	2–2	1–0	2–0	3–1	5–1	3–0	2–3	2–0
Rochdale	2–0	0–0	0–2	2–1	2–0	0–0	2–2	1–1	1–1	0–0	1–0	1–4	0–1	2–3	2–1		4–0	0–2	2–1	2–1	3–1	3–0	2–0	3–2
Scunthorpe United	2–2	1–1	1–0	2–2	1–1	3–0	1–1	2–2	3–3	3–1	2–2	2–0	0–2	1–1	1–1	1–1		2–1	2–0	0–2	2–0	4–4	1–2	3–2
Southend United	3–0	2–1	3–1	1–0	3–0	1–0	0–0	5–1	4–0	2–0	0–0	2–0	0–0	1–0	5–1	1–1	2–0		2–0	3–1	2–0	1–0	1–0	3–0
Stockport County	1–0	2–1	1–2	1–2	1–3	0–1	2–1	1–1	0–2	0–0	0–0	2–1	1–2	3–4	2–1	2–2	2–0	1–0		4–1	1–0	0–1	0–0	2–0
Torquay United	2–0	2–0	2–0	3–1	1–0	0–2	2–3	1–0	2–1	0–1	1–2	1–1	3–3	2–0	4–0	2–0	2–1	0–3	1–2		2–1	2–0	2–3	1–2
Tranmere	3–1	0–1	1–1	3–1	0–1	3–1	1–1	2–0	2–2	2–1	0–0	1–0	3–2	1–2	1–2	3–1	1–2	2–2	1–0	1–0		2–3	3–0	5–0
Wigan Athletic	1–0	0–1	0–1	2–1	0–0	3–1	3–0	4–1	0–3	1–0	0–2	2–0	3–0	1–1	1–0	0–1	1–1	0–1	2–1	2–0	1–1		1–0	1–0
Wimbledon	4–0	2–0	2–2	2–4	2–0	1–1	1–0	3–0	5–0	0–0	0–1	2–1	1–0	2–1	1–0	4–1	2–2	0–1	1–2	1–0	2–1	1–0		3–0
York City	4–1	4–0	0–3	0–1	2–0	1–2	0–1	1–1	0–1	1–2	1–0	2–0	1–2	1–2	4–1	1–2	1–0	0–1	1–0	0–0	4–1	2–1	0–1	

Updated to match(es) played on unknown. Source: Soccerbase
Legend: Blue = home team win; Yellow = draw; Red = away team win.

=== Maps ===
Locations of the Football League Fourth Division teams 1980–1981
Locations of the Football League Fourth Division London teams 1980–1981

== Election/Re-election to the Football League ==
Altrincham won the Alliance Premier League for the second season running and earned the right to apply for election to the Football League to replace one of the four bottom sides in the 1980–81 Football League Fourth Division. The vote went as follows:

Club	Final Position	Votes
Tranmere Rovers	21st (Fourth Division)	48
Hereford United	22nd (Fourth Division)	46
York City	24th (Fourth Division)	46
Halifax Town	23rd (Fourth Division)	41
Altrincham	1st (Alliance Premier League)	15

As a result of this, all four Football League teams were re-elected, and Altrincham were denied membership of the League.

== Attendances ==
=== Division One ===
No.	Club	Average	Highest	Lowest
1	Manchester United	45,071	57,049	37,954
2	Liverpool FC	37,547	48,114	24,462
3	Manchester City FC	33,587	50,114	26,141
4	Aston Villa FC	34,117	47,998	25,673
5	Arsenal FC	32,480	57,472	17,431
6	Tottenham Hotspur FC	30,724	43,398	22,741
7	Sunderland AFC	26,477	41,141	17,749
8	Everton FC	26,105	52,607	15,355
9	Ipswich Town FC	24,619	32,363	19,515
10	Nottingham Forest FC	24,483	33,930	19,690
11	Wolverhampton Wanderers FC	21,551	34,693	15,160
12	Southampton FC	21,482	24,083	18,824
13	Leeds United FC	21,377	39,206	14,333
14	West Bromwich Albion FC	20,331	34,195	14,861
15	Leicester City FC	19,476	28,455	13,666
16	Birmingham City FC	19,248	33,879	12,472
17	Brighton & Hove Albion FC	18,984	27,560	12,117
18	Crystal Palace FC	19,280	31,652	11,122
19	Norwich City FC	17,140	25,636	11,528
20	Coventry City FC	16,904	27,094	11,521
21	Middlesbrough FC	16,432	35,065	11,076
22	Stoke City FC	15,580	24,534	10,722

=== Division Two ===
No.	Club	Average	Highest	Lowest
1	West Ham United FC	27,140	36,032	20,402
2	Sheffield Wednesday FC	18,624	28,518	14,230
3	Chelsea FC	17,897	32,669	11,569
4	Derby County FC	16,682	20,353	13,846
5	Newcastle United FC	16,001	24,866	11,013
6	Swansea City AFC	13,143	22,160	8,788
7	Watford FC	13,108	23,547	10,044
8	Blackburn Rovers FC	11,684	19,222	7,855
9	Grimsby Town FC	10,961	17,924	7,377
10	Queens Park Rangers FC	10,936	23,811	6,668
11	Luton Town FC	10,291	17,031	7,874
12	Bolton Wanderers FC	9,847	18,184	6,315
13	Bristol City FC	9,765	16,612	6,042
14	Notts County FC	9,551	16,560	6,565
15	Preston North End FC	7,631	19,023	4,748
16	Cardiff City FC	6,767	21,198	4,140
17	Oldham Athletic FC	6,510	12,005	4,730
18	Wrexham AFC	6,495	10,913	3,220
19	Leyton Orient FC	6,076	14,592	3,824
20	Bristol Rovers FC	5,929	10,087	3,552
21	Cambridge United FC	5,796	9,558	3,719
22	Shrewsbury Town FC	5,616	9,303	4,196

=== Division Three ===
No.	Club	Average	Highest	Lowest
1	Portsmouth FC	13,514	17,412	9,172
2	Barnsley FC	12,800	25,935	8,693
3	Sheffield United FC	12,772	20,369	8,601
4	Huddersfield Town AFC	11,548	28,901	6,965
5	Rotherham United FC	7,985	13,515	4,436
6	Chesterfield FC	7,331	17,169	3,059
7	Charlton Athletic FC	7,206	12,700	3,359
8	Swindon Town FC	6,933	9,966	4,761
9	Plymouth Argyle FC	6,766	14,792	4,315
10	Brentford FC	6,752	11,610	4,883
11	Burnley FC	6,469	11,075	3,947
12	Blackpool FC	5,863	10,427	3,188
13	Newport County AFC	5,683	8,062	3,748
14	Reading FC	5,439	7,561	3,399
15	Fulham FC	5,060	9,921	3,387
16	Gillingham FC	4,676	8,775	3,228
17	Exeter City FC	4,559	8,491	3,056
18	Millwall FC	4,494	8,311	2,780
19	Hull City AFC	4,319	8,618	2,059
20	Walsall FC	4,265	6,026	3,185
21	Oxford United FC	4,132	6,477	2,741
22	Carlisle United FC	4,064	7,136	2,828
23	Chester City FC	2,892	4,863	1,778
24	Colchester United FC	2,645	4,952	1,430

=== Division Four ===
No.	Club	Average	Highest	Lowest
1	Southend United FC	6,095	12,391	4,190
2	Doncaster Rovers FC	5,412	11,373	2,186
3	Lincoln City FC	4,715	8,832	3,458
4	Wigan Athletic FC	4,434	6,029	3,370
5	Peterborough United FC	4,137	6,265	2,772
6	Mansfield Town FC	3,400	4,883	1,925
7	AFC Bournemouth	3,380	5,200	2,203
8	Hartlepool United FC	3,115	5,578	1,579
9	Aldershot Town FC	2,989	4,970	1,813
10	Crewe Alexandra FC	2,909	4,634	1,881
11	Bradford City AFC	2,858	4,356	1,249
12	Bury FC	2,748	4,700	1,779
13	Port Vale FC	2,738	4,239	2,091
14	Rochdale AFC	2,565	5,230	1,474
15	Darlington FC	2,537	7,155	1,304
16	Wimbledon FC	2,484	3,898	1,775
17	Hereford United FC	2,444	3,412	1,476
18	Scunthorpe United FC	2,357	5,032	1,498
19	Stockport County FC	2,335	3,536	1,431
20	Northampton Town FC	2,196	3,800	1,380
21	York City FC	2,163	4,641	1,167
22	Torquay United FC	2,050	3,683	1,227
23	Halifax Town AFC	1,924	4,444	922
24	Tranmere Rovers	1,901	3,439	1,073

== See also ==
- 1980-81 in English football
