= 1980–81 in English football =

Football in England
- Season: 1980–81

Men's football
- First Division: Aston Villa
- Second Division: West Ham United
- Third Division: Rotherham United
- Fourth Division: Southend United
- Alliance Premier League: Altrincham
- FA Cup: Tottenham Hotspur
- League Cup: Liverpool
- Charity Shield: Liverpool

The 1980–81 season was the 101st season of competitive football in England.

== Diary of the season ==
9 August 1980: Liverpool win the Charity Shield as Terry McDermott scores the only goal in a 1–0 win over West Ham United.

14 August 1980: Having not played a first team game for Arsenal, Clive Allen leaves the club after just two months to join Crystal Palace, again costing his new club £1,250,000.

16 August 1980: Norwich City achieve the biggest win of the opening day of the First Division season, beating Stoke City 5–1. Champions Liverpool begin with a 3–0 win at home to Crystal Palace. Kevin Keegan makes his League début for Southampton in a 2–0 victory at home to Manchester City. Tottenham Hotspur's expensive new strike force of Steve Archibald and Garth Crooks help them to a 2–0 win over Nottingham Forest, with Crooks scoring the second goal.

30 August 1980: Newcastle United's Bill McGarry becomes the first managerial casualty of the season, being sacked after a failure to win any of the Second Division fixtures combined with a humiliating League Cup exit at the hands of Fourth Division side Bury. Former manager Joe Harvey takes charge of the club in a caretaker capacity, but quickly distances himself from any thoughts of a permanent return to the manager's job.

31 August 1980: The first month of the Football League season ends with Ipswich Town, Southampton and Aston Villa level at the top of the First Division after four matches. Stoke City, Manchester City and Leeds United occupy the bottom three places. The Second Division promotion race has begun with Blackburn Rovers, Derby County and Sheffield Wednesday occupying the top three places. Cambridge United, in only their 11th season as a Football League team, stand fourth in the division harbouring dreams of the quickest modern day rise from non-league football to the First Division.

1 September 1980: Third Division basement side Carlisle United sack manager Martin Harvey after only six months in charge, and re-appoint former manager Bob Stokoe to replace him.

7 September 1980: Chesterfield manager Arthur Cox is appointed as Newcastle United's new manager. Jimmy Adamson resigns as Leeds United manager.

16 September 1980: Leeds United appoint former player and Barnsley manager Allan Clarke as Jimmy Adamson's successor. Clarke is succeeded at Barnsley by former Leeds teammate Norman Hunter.

30 September 1980: September draws to a close with Ipswich Town leading the First Division by four points over their nearest rivals Liverpool, Everton and Aston Villa. Crystal Palace have slumped to the bottom of the table and are joined in the relegation zone by Manchester City and Leeds United. The race for a place in the First Division next season is headed by the Second Division top three of Blackburn Rovers, West Ham United and Notts County. Cambridge United's promising start has fallen away and they now stand third from bottom.

1 October 1980: Manchester City sack manager Malcolm Allison and replace him with Norwich City's John Bond, who in turn is replaced by Ken Brown.

2 October 1980: Terry Venables departs Crystal Palace to take over at Queens Park Rangers, who sacked Tommy Docherty earlier that day. Crystal Palace appoint Venables' assistant, Ernie Walley as caretaker manager.

17 October 1980: Andy Ritchie, the highly promising Manchester United striker who turns 20 next month, is surprisingly sold to Brighton & Hove Albion for £500,000.

22 October 1980: Bottom of the First Division, Manchester City win their first league match of the season at the thirteenth attempt when they defeat Tottenham Hotspur 3–1.

31 October 1980: Aston Villa, who last won a top division title in 1910, finish October as First Division leaders, though Ipswich Town, still unbeaten, are two points behind them with two games in hand. Liverpool, Nottingham Forest, Manchester United and West Bromwich Albion are a further two points behind. Crystal Palace, Manchester City and Brighton & Hove Albion occupy the relegation places. The race for three places in the First Division next season is being headed by Notts County, West Ham United and Chelsea, with Swansea City, Blackburn Rovers and Sheffield Wednesday in close contention.

11 November 1980: Ipswich Town's unbeaten start to the season ends when they lose their fifteenth match 1–0 to bottom-placed Brighton & Hove Albion.

29 November 1980: Ken Brown makes his first signing for Norwich City by paying Liverpool £100,000 for 19-year-old central defender Dave Watson.

30 November 1980: November ends with Aston Villa still leading the First Division, two points ahead of Liverpool. Ipswich Town are now third, but are three points off top spot with three games in hand. West Bromwich Albion and Arsenal complete the top five. Leicester City prop up the First Division having lost their last four games, and join Crystal Palace and Brighton & Hove Albion in the bottom three. West Ham United, Chelsea and Notts County continue to head the challenge for promotion to the First Division.

6 December 1980: Following a run of just one point in the last month, Crystal Palace reappoint former manager Malcolm Allison. Ernie Walley is offered the chance to continue as first-team manager with Allison in the role of general manager, but opts to leave the club and rejoin Terry Venables at Queens Park Rangers, leaving Allison in sole charge.

31 December 1980: The year ends with Liverpool leading the First Division on goal difference ahead of Aston Villa. Ipswich Town are a point behind the leaders with two games in hand, and Arsenal are a further three points adrift. Crystal Palace and Leicester City remain stranded in the bottom three, but Brighton & Hove Albion have climbed out of the drop zone on goal difference at the expense of Norwich City. FA Cup holders West Ham United lead the Second Division promotion race, joining in the top three by Swansea City (who have never played in the top flight before) and Chelsea (who were last in the top flight two seasons ago). Notts County and Derby County are pushing the top three hard, while the likes of Luton Town and Orient are starting to emerge as possible contenders.

3 January 1981: Ipswich Town beat Aston Villa 1–0 in a heavyweight clash in the FA Cup third round. Everton defeat Arsenal 2–0.

10 January 1981: Aston Villa move to the top of the First Division after beating Liverpool 2–0 at Villa Park.

31 January 1981: January draws to a close with Ipswich Town back on top of the First Division, ahead of second placed Aston Villa on goal difference with a game in hand. Liverpool's 85-match unbeaten home run in all competitions since February 1978 is ended by a 2–1 home defeat to struggling Leicester City, and the Reds are now four points off the top. Southampton and West Bromwich Albion complete the top five, while Manchester United, with fifteen draws already this season, have fallen to ninth in the table. Crystal Palace, Leicester City and Norwich City remain in the bottom three. West Ham United continue to lead the race for promotion, with Notts County and Chelsea completing the top three.

3 February 1981: New Crystal Palace owner Ron Noades sacks Malcolm Allison and appoints Wimbledon manager Dario Gradi as Palace's fourth manager of the season. Wimbledon in turn appoint coach Dave Bassett as their new manager.

28 February 1981: Having won five League matches in a row, Ipswich Town remain top of the First Division at the end of February, with Aston Villa two points behind them. Liverpool's challenge is effectively over after taking just four points from four League games this month. Crystal Palace, Leicester City and Norwich City still occupy the relegation zone. West Ham United remain top of the Second Division, followed closely behind by Notts County and joined in the top three by Sheffield Wednesday at the expense of Chelsea, who have slumped to seventh. Grimsby Town have emerged as surprise promotion contenders alongside larger clubs like Blackburn Rovers and Derby County.

12 March 1981: Ken Brown continues to build for the future of First Division strugglers Norwich City by paying Queens Park Rangers £225,000 for 22-year-old goalkeeper Chris Woods. Meanwhile, Liverpool sign 23-year-old Vancouver Whitecaps and Zimbabwe goalkeeper Bruce Grobbelaar for £250,000.

31 March 1981: Ipswich Town lose 3–0 away to Leeds United but remain one point ahead of second placed Aston Villa at the top of the First Division. West Bromwich Albion have moved into third, but are a distant six points behind Aston Villa. Crystal Palace, Norwich City and Leicester City remain in the bottom three places. West Ham United and Notts County continue to head the Second Division promotion race, joined in the top three by Grimsby Town at the expense of Sheffield Wednesday, who are now eighth.

4 April 1981: Crystal Palace are relegated from the First Division with five matches of the season remaining. West Ham United clinch promotion to the First Division.

7 April 1981: Sunderland sack their manager Ken Knighton and appoint Mick Docherty as caretaker manager for the last five games of the season.

8 April 1981: Aston Villa move three points clear at the top of the First Division after winning the derby against third-placed West Bromwich Albion 1–0.

10 April 1981: Following a disastrous run of form which has turned an initially promising season into a struggle against relegation, Everton announce that manager Gordon Lee will not be offered a new contract and will leave the club at the end of the season. Blackburn Rovers manager Howard Kendall is considered the overwhelming favourite to succeed Lee.

14 April 1981: Ipswich Town return to Villa Park for a crucial League match against First Division leaders Aston Villa, and win 2–1 to move within a point of their opponents with a game in hand.

18 April 1981: Aston Villa take a decisive step towards the First Division title by beating Nottingham Forest 2–0 on the same day that Ipswich Town lose 2–0 at home to Arsenal.

25 April 1981: Aston Villa defeat Middlesbrough 3–0 at Villa Park, meaning they only need a draw from their final game of the season to seal their first league title since 1910. Leicester City are relegated.

30 April 1981: Manchester United sack Dave Sexton after four trophyless seasons as manager.

2 May 1981: Aston Villa seal their first league title for 71 years despite losing their final game of the season 2–0 to Arsenal as Ipswich Town lose 2–1 to Middlesbrough, their third League defeat in four matches. Norwich City are relegated after a 3–2 home defeat to second-bottom Leicester City. Joining West Ham United in promotion to the First Division are Notts County after 55 years away, and Swansea City for the first time in their history.

12 May 1981: Zico scores the only goal as Brazil beat England 1–0 at Wembley.

8 June 1981: Having failed to save Crystal Palace from relegation, Clive Allen drops down a division to return to Queens Park Rangers in a £400,000 deal.

9 June 1981: After a month of searching for a new manager, Manchester United appoint Ron Atkinson from West Bromwich Albion.

== National teams ==
England's 1982 World Cup qualifying series began with a 4–0 win over Norway at Wembley in September 1980. They were defeated 2–1 by Romania in Bucharest a month later, however. This was followed by a 2–1 win over Switzerland at Wembley in November. Spain beat England 2–1 in a friendly at Wembley in March 1981. The following month, England drew 0–0 with Romania in their World Cup qualifying game at Wembley.

England lost 1–0 at home to Scotland in the Home Championship in May, but the tournament remained unfinished after Northern Ireland are unable to complete their fixtures. A week later, a 2–1 defeat away to Switzerland left England struggling to qualify for the 1982 World Cup Finals. England ended a run of six matches without a win with a 3–1 victory away to Hungary in a World Cup qualifier in June.

== UEFA competitions ==
English clubs continued their dominance of European football. Alan Kennedy scored the only goal of the game as Liverpool won the European Cup, beating Real Madrid 1–0 in the final at the Parc des Princes in Paris. It was the fifth year running that an English club had won the competition. Ipswich Town won the 1981 UEFA Cup Final against AZ Alkmaar, 5–4 on aggregate. Managed by Bobby Robson, Ipswich won the first leg, 3–0, at Portman Road, followed by a 4–2 defeat away in the second leg.

== FA Cup ==
Inspired by Ricardo Villa and Osvaldo Ardiles, World Cup winners with Argentina in 1978, Tottenham Hotspur overcame Manchester City in the FA Cup final replay to lift their first major trophy under the management of Keith Burkinshaw. City's Tommy Hutchison scored for both teams, first putting Manchester City 1–0 ahead but later scoring an own goal to bring the match to a replay, which Spurs won 3–2.

Holders West Ham United were beaten 1–0 in a third round second replay by fellow Second Division side Wrexham. Manchester City defeated Norwich City 6–0 in the fourth round tie at Maine Road, just two months after John Bond's move between the two clubs as manager. Everton knocked out Merseyside rivals Liverpool with a 2–1 victory at Goodison Park, and Nottingham Forest beat Manchester United 1–0. Third Division Exeter City cause an upset by beating Leicester City 3–1 in a fourth round replay. Exeter City reached the quarter-finals for only the second time in their history by defeating Newcastle United 4–0 in a replay after drawing 1–1 in the original fixture.

Exeter's FA Cup run finally ended when they lost 2–0 away to Tottenham Hotspur in the quarter-finals. At the City Ground, Ipswich Town went 2–0 up before Nottingham Forest scored three times to take the lead; the match finished 3–3 after Frans Thijssen sent the match to a replay. Ipswich Town beat Nottingham Forest 1–0 in the quarter-final replay, but their hopes of a treble of the league title, FA Cup and UEFA Cup were ended with a 1–0 extra-time defeat by Manchester City in the semi-final at Villa Park. In the other semi-final, Tottenham Hotspur beat Wolverhampton Wanderers 3–0 in a replay at Highbury after a 2–2 draw at Hillsborough.

== League Cup ==
Liverpool won the 1981 Football League Cup Final to win their first League Cup, beating Second Division West Ham United 2–1 in a replay at Villa Park after the original tie at Wembley ended in a 1–1 draw.

== Football League ==
=== First Division ===
A fiercely contested First Division title race went right to the wire between Aston Villa and Ipswich Town, as challenges from the likes of Arsenal, West Bromwich Albion and Liverpool fell away during the season's closing stages. The title was finally won by Villa for the first time since 1910, while Ipswich did manage to win the UEFA Cup. Liverpool slipped into fifth place but did win the European Cup for the third time and their first-ever League Cup.

Manchester United could only finish eighth, which cost Dave Sexton his manager's job. Sexton had come under increased pressure over the disappointment of record signing Garry Birtles, who failed to find the net for United after his late autumn signing from Nottingham Forest in a million-plus transfer. At the end of the campaign Sexton was replaced by Ron Atkinson, who had just finished fourth in the league and reached the UEFA Cup quarter finals with West Bromwich Albion. United's cross-city neighbours had also changed their manager, when dismissing Malcolm Allison in October to replace him with Norwich's John Bond, who pulled them up from the foot of the table to finish 12th in the league and reach the FA Cup final, where they took Tottenham to a replay before losing 3–2.

Crystal Palace won only six matches and were relegated. They were joined in the Second Division by Norwich City and Leicester City. The Eagles' stay in the top flight had lasted just two years, while The Canaries' relegation brought to an end their six years in the limelight. The Foxes, however, were relegated after just a single season in the First Division.

| Pos | Team | Pld | W | D | L | GF | GA | GD | Pts | Qualification or relegation |
|---|---|---|---|---|---|---|---|---|---|---|
| 1 | Aston Villa (C) | 42 | 26 | 8 | 8 | 72 | 40 | +32 | 60 | Qualification for the European Cup first round |
| 2 | Ipswich Town | 42 | 23 | 10 | 9 | 77 | 43 | +34 | 56 | Qualification for the UEFA Cup first round |
| 3 | Arsenal | 42 | 19 | 15 | 8 | 61 | 45 | +16 | 53 | Qualification for the UEFA Cup first round |
| 4 | West Bromwich Albion | 42 | 20 | 12 | 10 | 60 | 42 | +18 | 52 | Qualification for the UEFA Cup first round |
| 5 | Liverpool | 42 | 17 | 17 | 8 | 62 | 42 | +20 | 51 | Qualification for the European Cup first round (Note: Liverpool qualified for the European Cup first round as the 1980–81 European Cup winners.) |
| 6 | Southampton | 42 | 20 | 10 | 12 | 76 | 56 | +20 | 50 | Qualification for the UEFA Cup first round |
| 7 | Nottingham Forest | 42 | 19 | 12 | 11 | 62 | 44 | +18 | 50 | |
| 8 | Manchester United | 42 | 15 | 18 | 9 | 51 | 36 | +15 | 48 | |
| 9 | Leeds United | 42 | 17 | 10 | 15 | 39 | 47 | −8 | 44 | |
| 10 | Tottenham Hotspur | 42 | 14 | 15 | 13 | 70 | 68 | +2 | 43 | Qualification for the European Cup Winners' Cup first round (Note: Tottenham Hotspur qualified for the European Cup Winners' Cup first round as the 1980–81 FA Cup winners.) |
| 11 | Stoke City | 42 | 12 | 18 | 12 | 51 | 60 | −9 | 42 | |
| 12 | Manchester City | 42 | 14 | 11 | 17 | 56 | 59 | −3 | 39 | |
| 13 | Birmingham City | 42 | 13 | 12 | 17 | 50 | 61 | −11 | 38 | |
| 14 | Middlesbrough | 42 | 16 | 5 | 21 | 53 | 61 | −8 | 37 | |
| 15 | Everton | 42 | 13 | 10 | 19 | 55 | 58 | −3 | 36 | |
| 16 | Coventry City | 42 | 13 | 10 | 19 | 48 | 68 | −20 | 36 | |
| 17 | Sunderland | 42 | 14 | 7 | 21 | 52 | 53 | −1 | 35 | |
| 18 | Wolverhampton Wanderers | 42 | 13 | 9 | 20 | 43 | 55 | −12 | 35 | |
| 19 | Brighton & Hove Albion | 42 | 14 | 7 | 21 | 54 | 67 | −13 | 35 | |
| 20 | Norwich City (R) | 42 | 13 | 7 | 22 | 49 | 73 | −24 | 33 | Relegation to the Second Division |
| 21 | Leicester City (R) | 42 | 13 | 6 | 23 | 40 | 67 | −27 | 32 | Relegation to the Second Division |
| 22 | Crystal Palace (R) | 42 | 6 | 7 | 29 | 47 | 83 | −36 | 19 | Relegation to the Second Division |

Source: World Football
Rules for classification: 1) Points; 2) Goal difference; 3) Goals scored
(C) Champions; (R) Relegated

=== Second Division ===
FA Cup holders West Ham United clinched the Second Division title by a wide margin to end their three-year absence from the First Division. They were joined by runners-up Notts County and a Swansea City side whose third-place finish gave them First Division football for the first time in their history and also completed a record of three promotions in four seasons. Blackburn Rovers missed out on promotion on goal difference, but their achievements did not go unnoticed by First Division clubs, as their manager Howard Kendall was then appointed manager of Everton.

Both Bristol City and Bristol Rovers were relegated from the Second Division, and they were joined in the relegation zone by Preston North End. The Robins suffered their second consecutive relegation, having been relegated from the top flight just 12 months previously, having not fallen as low as the Third Division for 16 years. Their close rivals, Bristol Rovers, on the other hand, returned to the Third Division after seven years in the Second. However, Preston North End's stay in the Second Division was even shorter, The Lilywhites having only been promoted three years previous.

| Pos | Team | Pld | W | D | L | GF | GA | GD | Pts | Qualification or relegation |
|---|---|---|---|---|---|---|---|---|---|---|
| 1 | West Ham United (C, P) | 42 | 28 | 10 | 4 | 79 | 29 | +50 | 66 | Promotion to the First Division |
| 2 | Notts County (P) | 42 | 18 | 17 | 7 | 49 | 38 | +11 | 53 | Promotion to the First Division |
| 3 | Swansea City (P) | 42 | 18 | 14 | 10 | 64 | 44 | +20 | 50 | Cup Winners' Cup first round and promotion to the First Division |
| 4 | Blackburn Rovers | 42 | 16 | 18 | 8 | 42 | 29 | +13 | 50 | |
| 5 | Luton Town | 42 | 18 | 12 | 12 | 61 | 46 | +15 | 48 | |
| 6 | Derby County | 42 | 15 | 15 | 12 | 57 | 52 | +5 | 45 | |
| 7 | Grimsby Town | 42 | 15 | 15 | 12 | 44 | 42 | +2 | 45 | |
| 8 | Queens Park Rangers | 42 | 15 | 13 | 14 | 56 | 46 | +10 | 43 | |
| 9 | Watford | 42 | 16 | 11 | 15 | 50 | 45 | +5 | 43 | |
| 10 | Sheffield Wednesday | 42 | 17 | 8 | 17 | 53 | 51 | +2 | 42 | |
| 11 | Newcastle United | 42 | 14 | 14 | 14 | 30 | 45 | −15 | 42 | |
| 12 | Chelsea | 42 | 14 | 12 | 16 | 46 | 41 | +5 | 40 | |
| 13 | Cambridge United | 42 | 17 | 6 | 19 | 53 | 65 | −12 | 40 | |
| 14 | Shrewsbury Town | 42 | 11 | 17 | 14 | 46 | 47 | −1 | 39 | |
| 15 | Oldham Athletic | 42 | 12 | 15 | 15 | 39 | 48 | −9 | 39 | |
| 16 | Wrexham | 42 | 12 | 14 | 16 | 43 | 45 | −2 | 38 | |
| 17 | Orient | 42 | 13 | 12 | 17 | 52 | 56 | −4 | 38 | |
| 18 | Bolton Wanderers | 42 | 14 | 10 | 18 | 61 | 66 | −5 | 38 | |
| 19 | Cardiff City | 42 | 12 | 12 | 18 | 44 | 60 | −16 | 36 | |
| 20 | Preston North End (R) | 42 | 11 | 14 | 17 | 41 | 62 | −21 | 36 | Relegation to the Third Division |
| 21 | Bristol City (R) | 42 | 7 | 16 | 19 | 29 | 51 | −22 | 30 | Relegation to the Third Division |
| 22 | Bristol Rovers (R) | 42 | 5 | 13 | 24 | 34 | 65 | −31 | 23 | Relegation to the Third Division |

Rules for classification: 1) Points; 2) Goal difference; 3) Goals scored
(C) Champions; (P) Promoted; (R) Relegated

=== Third Division ===
Ian Porterfield, the scorer of Sunderland's winning goal in their famous FA Cup triumph of 1973, achieved the first success of his managerial career by guiding Rotherham United to the Third Division title and a place in the Second Division. Runners-up in the Third Division were another South Yorkshire side, Barnsley, now managed by the former Leeds United defender Norman Hunter. The final promotion place was snatched by Charlton Athletic, who finished three points ahead of a Huddersfield side looking to win a second successive promotion.

Sheffield United and Blackpool both fell into the Fourth Division for the first time, and were joined by Hull City and Colchester United.

Despite falling out of the Third Division this season, Sheffield United remarkably managed to lure Ian Porterfield from a Rotherham side who had just reached the Second Division, offering him a five-year contract and making the resources available to him to get the Blades back into the First Division by 1986.

| Pos | Team | Pld | W | D | L | GF | GA | GD | Pts | Promotion or relegation |
|---|---|---|---|---|---|---|---|---|---|---|
| 1 | Rotherham United (C, P) | 46 | 24 | 13 | 9 | 62 | 32 | +30 | 61 | Promotion to the Second Division |
| 2 | Barnsley (P) | 46 | 21 | 17 | 8 | 72 | 45 | +27 | 59 | Promotion to the Second Division |
| 3 | Charlton Athletic (P) | 46 | 25 | 9 | 12 | 63 | 44 | +19 | 59 | Promotion to the Second Division |
| 4 | Huddersfield Town | 46 | 21 | 14 | 11 | 71 | 40 | +31 | 56 | |
| 5 | Chesterfield | 46 | 23 | 10 | 13 | 72 | 48 | +24 | 56 | |
| 6 | Portsmouth | 46 | 22 | 9 | 15 | 55 | 47 | +8 | 53 | |
| 7 | Plymouth Argyle | 46 | 19 | 14 | 13 | 56 | 44 | +12 | 52 | |
| 8 | Burnley | 46 | 18 | 14 | 14 | 60 | 48 | +12 | 50 | |
| 9 | Brentford | 46 | 14 | 19 | 13 | 52 | 49 | +3 | 47 | |
| 10 | Reading | 46 | 18 | 10 | 18 | 62 | 62 | 0 | 46 | |
| 11 | Exeter City | 46 | 16 | 13 | 17 | 62 | 66 | −4 | 45 | |
| 12 | Newport County | 46 | 15 | 13 | 18 | 64 | 61 | +3 | 43 | |
| 13 | Fulham | 46 | 15 | 13 | 18 | 57 | 64 | −7 | 43 | |
| 14 | Oxford United | 46 | 13 | 17 | 16 | 39 | 47 | −8 | 43 | |
| 15 | Gillingham | 46 | 12 | 18 | 16 | 48 | 58 | −10 | 42 | |
| 16 | Millwall | 46 | 14 | 14 | 18 | 43 | 60 | −17 | 42 | |
| 17 | Swindon Town | 46 | 13 | 15 | 18 | 51 | 56 | −5 | 41 | |
| 18 | Chester | 46 | 15 | 11 | 20 | 38 | 48 | −10 | 41 | |
| 19 | Carlisle United | 46 | 14 | 13 | 19 | 56 | 70 | −14 | 41 | |
| 20 | Walsall | 46 | 13 | 15 | 18 | 59 | 74 | −15 | 41 | |
| 21 | Sheffield United (R) | 46 | 14 | 12 | 20 | 65 | 63 | +2 | 40 | Relegation to the Fourth Division |
| 22 | Colchester United (R) | 46 | 14 | 11 | 21 | 45 | 65 | −20 | 39 | Relegation to the Fourth Division |
| 23 | Blackpool (R) | 46 | 9 | 14 | 23 | 45 | 75 | −30 | 32 | Relegation to the Fourth Division |
| 24 | Hull City (R) | 46 | 8 | 16 | 22 | 40 | 71 | −31 | 32 | Relegation to the Fourth Division |

Source: rsssf.com
(C) Champions; (P) Promoted; (R) Relegated

=== Fourth Division ===
Southend United won the Fourth Division title to clinch a place in the Third Division. They were joined by runners-up Lincoln City, third placed Doncaster Rovers and fourth placed Wimbledon.

There were no movements between the Fourth Division and the Alliance Premier League as the re-election system went in favour of the league's bottom four clubs, although bottom-placed York City came perilously close to being replaced by Alliance champions Altrincham, surviving by just two votes.

| Pos | Team | Pld | W | D | L | GF | GA | GD | Pts | Promotion |
|---|---|---|---|---|---|---|---|---|---|---|
| 1 | Southend United (C, P) | 46 | 30 | 7 | 9 | 79 | 31 | +48 | 67 | Promotion to the Third Division |
| 2 | Lincoln City (P) | 46 | 25 | 15 | 6 | 66 | 25 | +41 | 65 | Promotion to the Third Division |
| 3 | Doncaster Rovers (P) | 46 | 22 | 12 | 12 | 59 | 49 | +10 | 56 | Promotion to the Third Division |
| 4 | Wimbledon (P) | 46 | 23 | 9 | 14 | 64 | 46 | +18 | 55 | Promotion to the Third Division |
| 5 | Peterborough United | 46 | 17 | 18 | 11 | 68 | 54 | +14 | 52 | |
| 6 | Aldershot | 46 | 18 | 14 | 14 | 43 | 41 | +2 | 50 | |
| 7 | Mansfield Town | 46 | 20 | 9 | 17 | 58 | 44 | +14 | 49 | |
| 8 | Darlington | 46 | 19 | 11 | 16 | 65 | 59 | +6 | 49 | |
| 9 | Hartlepool United | 46 | 20 | 9 | 17 | 64 | 61 | +3 | 49 | |
| 10 | Northampton Town | 46 | 18 | 13 | 15 | 65 | 67 | −2 | 49 | |
| 11 | Wigan Athletic | 46 | 18 | 11 | 17 | 51 | 55 | −4 | 47 | |
| 12 | Bury | 46 | 17 | 11 | 18 | 70 | 62 | +8 | 45 | |
| 13 | Bournemouth | 46 | 16 | 13 | 17 | 47 | 48 | −1 | 45 | |
| 14 | Bradford City | 46 | 14 | 16 | 16 | 53 | 60 | −7 | 44 | |
| 15 | Rochdale | 46 | 14 | 15 | 17 | 60 | 70 | −10 | 43 | |
| 16 | Scunthorpe United | 46 | 11 | 20 | 15 | 60 | 69 | −9 | 42 | |
| 17 | Torquay United | 46 | 18 | 5 | 23 | 55 | 63 | −8 | 41 | |
| 18 | Crewe Alexandra | 46 | 13 | 14 | 19 | 48 | 61 | −13 | 40 | |
| 19 | Port Vale | 46 | 12 | 15 | 19 | 57 | 70 | −13 | 39 | |
| 20 | Stockport County | 46 | 16 | 7 | 23 | 44 | 57 | −13 | 39 | |
| 21 | Tranmere Rovers | 46 | 13 | 10 | 23 | 59 | 73 | −14 | 36 | Re-elected |
| 22 | Hereford United | 46 | 11 | 13 | 22 | 38 | 62 | −24 | 35 | Re-elected |
| 23 | Halifax Town | 46 | 11 | 12 | 23 | 44 | 71 | −27 | 34 | Re-elected |
| 24 | York City | 46 | 12 | 9 | 25 | 47 | 66 | −19 | 33 | Re-elected |

(C) Champions; (P) Promoted

=== Top goalscorers ===
First Division

- Steve Archibald (Tottenham Hotspur) and Peter Withe (Aston Villa) – 20 goals

Second Division

- David Cross (West Ham United) – 22 goals

Third Division

- Tony Kellow (Exeter City) – 25 goals

Fourth Division

- Alan Cork (Wimbledon) – 23 goals

== Non-league football ==
The divisional champions of the major non-League competitions were:

| Competition | Winners |
|---|---|
| Alliance Premier League | Altrincham |
| Isthmian League | Slough Town |
| Northern Premier League | Runcorn |
| Southern League | Midland Division – Alvechurch; Southern Division – Dartford |
| FA Trophy | Bishop's Stortford |
| FA Vase | Whickham |

== Awards ==
- High scoring defensive midfielder John Wark was credited for his achievements at UEFA Cup Winners Ipswich Town as PFA Players' Player of the Year.
- Aston Villa's forward Gary Shaw added the PFA Young Player of the Year award to his league championship medal.
- Ipswich Town's Dutch midfielder Frans Thijssen was voted FWA Footballer of the Year.

== Star managers ==
- Ron Saunders ended Aston Villa's 71-year wait for the league championship trophy by pipping Ipswich Town at the post.
- Bob Paisley made up for Liverpool's disappointing league form with success in the European Cup and League Cup.
- Bobby Robson couldn't quite bring the league championship trophy to Ipswich Town but compensated by bringing them the UEFA Cup.
- Keith Burkinshaw completed his rebuilding programme at Tottenham Hotspur by yielding an FA Cup triumph.
- John Lyall had another successful season with West Ham United as they won promotion to the First Division a year after winning the FA Cup.
- John Toshack completed the quickest rise through the Football League with Swansea City, who climbed from the Fourth Division to the First Division with three promotions in four seasons.
- Ron Atkinson took West Bromwich Albion to fourth place in the league to attain their second UEFA Cup place in three seasons.
- Terry Neill guided Arsenal to third place in the league to ensure UEFA Cup qualification.
- Jimmy Sirrel took Notts County into the First Division for the first time in nearly 60 years.
- Norman Hunter attained promotion to the Second Division with Barnsley.

== Deaths ==
13 August 1980: George Haslam, 82, was a half-back during the interwar years for Manchester United, Darwen and Portsmouth.

29 August 1980: Billy Furness, 71, scored 93 league goals from inside-forward between 1928 and 1947 for Leeds United and Norwich City and was capped once for England in 1933.

6 September 1980: Joe Bradford, 79, scored a club record 267 goals in all competitions for Birmingham City between 1920 and 1935, completing his career with five games and one goal for Bristol City. He was capped 12 times for England, scoring seven goals.

7 October 1980: Jim Lewis, 71, played 111 league games for Watford as a centre-half in the 1930s before his playing career was ended by the war.

20 December 1980: Tom Waring, 74, scored 159 league goals from centre-forward for Aston Villa between 1928 and 1935, though he failed to win a major trophy with them. He had previously scored 23 goals in 24 league games for Tranmere Rovers, and after leaving Villa Park he turned out for Barnsley and Wolverhampton Wanderers before returning to Tranmere for two years and finishing his career at Accrington Stanley. By the time of his last senior game in 1938, he had scored 244 league goals. He was capped five times by England in the early 1930s and scored four goals.

30 December 1980: George Beel, 80, scored a club record 178 league goals for Burnley between 1923 and 1932. His career spanned from 1919 to 1933 and took in a total of 243 league goals. He also turned out for Lincoln City (twice), Merthyr Town, Chesterfield and Rochdale.

3 February 1981: Sammy Crooks, 73, played 408 league games on the right wing for Derby County between 1927 and 1947 after signing from Durham City. He played for the Rams in the first five rounds of the FA Cup in 1946 but a knee injury prevented him from playing in the final. He managed Shrewsbury Town in their first four seasons in the Football League and also managed four different non-league sides. He was capped 26 times by England in the 1930s and scored seven goals.

4 February 1981: Joe Jacques, 36, made more than 300 league appearances in defence for Lincoln City, Darlington, Southend United, Gillingham and Hartlepool United between 1964 and 1976. He began his professional career in 1959 with Preston but failed to make a league appearance for them in five years.

16 March 1981: Reg Spencer, 72, played 261 games at left-half for his only club Tranmere Rovers in the 1930s.

6 April 1981: Des Harlock, 58, played 150 league games for Tranmere Rovers as a right-winger between 1946 and 1954 after signing from Liverpool in 1945, his league debut delayed until his 24th year due to the war.

10 May 1981: Bert Lyons, 79, played 76 league games for Orient between 1926 and 1930 before signing for Tottenham Hotspur and completing his league career with 54 league games in three years.

16 June 1981: Billy Hughes, 63, played 200 league games between 1935 and 1951 for Birmingham City, Luton Town and Chelsea in a career which was disrupted by the war. He was capped ten times by Wales.

20 June 1981: Billy Charlton, 80, scored 103 league goals as a left-winger for South Shields, West Ham United, Newport County, Cardiff City and finally Tranmere Rovers, 72 of those goals coming for his final club.
