= 1978–79 Football League =

80th season of the Football League

The Football League
- Season: 1978–79
- Champions: Liverpool
- New Club in League: Wigan Athletic

The 1978–79 season was the 80th completed season of the Football League.

Bob Paisley won his third league title at Liverpool as his side fought off competition from Nottingham Forest and West Bromwich Albion. Albion were in their first season under the management of Ron Atkinson, and pulled off a famous 5–3 away win over Manchester United with a team that included Bryan Robson, Brendan Batson, Cyrille Regis and Laurie Cunningham.

The three relegation places went to Queens Park Rangers, Birmingham City and Chelsea. QPR had declined since the departure of Dave Sexton in 1977 and were relegated just three years after finishing runners-up in the league. Meanwhile, Chelsea's manager Danny Blanchflower paid for his team's shortcomings by losing his job.

Money dominated the headlines during the season: Trevor Francis became England's first million-pound footballer after joining Nottingham Forest from Birmingham City. Liverpool became one of the first English clubs to have a shirt sponsor when they agreed a sponsorship deal with Japanese hi-fi manufacturer Hitachi.

Crystal Palace won the Second Division title, followed by Brighton & Hove Albion, who were promoted to the top division for the first time, and third-placed Stoke City. Going down were Sheffield United, Millwall and Blackburn Rovers.

Shrewsbury Town were champions of the Third Division. The other two promotion spots were occupied by Watford and Swansea City. Peterborough United, Walsall, Tranmere Rovers and Lincoln City were relegated to the Fourth Division.

Reading, Grimsby Town, Wimbledon and Barnsley occupied the Fourth Division promotion places. The success came for Wimbledon in only their second season as a league club.

== Final league tables and results ==
The tables and results below are reproduced here in the exact form that they can be found at The Rec.Sport.Soccer Statistics Foundation website and in Rothmans Book of Football League Records 1888–89 to 1978–79, with home and away statistics separated.

During the first five seasons of the league, that is, until the season 1893–94, re-election process concerned the clubs which finished in the bottom four of the league. From the 1894–95 season and until the 1920–21 season the re-election process was required of the clubs which finished in the bottom three of the league. From the 1922–23 season on it was required of the bottom two teams of both Third Division North and Third Division South. Since the Fourth Division was established in the 1958–59 season, the re-election process has concerned the bottom four clubs in that division.

== First Division ==
Football League First Division
- Season: 1978–79
- Champions: Liverpool; 11th English title
- Relegated: Queens Park Rangers; Birmingham City; Chelsea
- European Cup: Liverpool; Nottingham Forest (defending champions)
- Cup Winners' Cup: Arsenal
- UEFA Cup: West Bromwich Albion; Everton; Leeds United; Ipswich Town
- Matches: 462
- Goals: 1,217 (2.63 per match)
- Top goalscorer: Frank Worthington (24 goals)
- Biggest home win: Liverpool 7–0 Tottenham Hotspur (2 September 1978)
- Biggest away win: Tottenham Hotspur 0–5 Arsenal (23 December 1978)
- Highest scoring: Middlesbrough 7–2 Chelsea (16 December 1978)

Bob Paisley guided Liverpool to their third league title in four seasons with the highest points total (68), best home record (40 points from 21 games) and highest goals scored to conceded ratio (85 scored, 16 conceded, ratio 5.3:1) ever attained in First Division history. Nottingham Forest built on their first league title triumph by winning the European Cup and retaining the League Cup under the management of Brian Clough, who in February signed striker Trevor Francis from Birmingham City in Britain's first million-pound transfer, although Forest finished eight points behind Liverpool in second place. West Bromwich Albion's first full season under Ron Atkinson brought an impressive third-place finish and a run to the quarter-finals of the UEFA Cup, as well as a famous 5-3 victory over Manchester United at Old Trafford just after Christmas.

Everton and Leeds United completed the top five. Seventh placed Arsenal compensated for a lack of a title challenge by beating Manchester United 3-2 in a memorable final of the FA Cup.

Chelsea, Birmingham City and QPR were relegated, while Derby County (champions just four years ago) only narrowly stayed up.

Pos	Team	Pld	W	D	L	GF	GA	GD	Pts	Qualification or relegation
1	Liverpool (C)	42	30	8	4	85	16	+69	68	Qualification for the European Cup first round (Note: Nottingham Forest qualified for the European Cup first round as the 1978–79 European Cup winners.)
2	Nottingham Forest	42	21	18	3	61	26	+35	60	Qualification for the European Cup first round
3	West Bromwich Albion	42	24	11	7	72	35	+37	59	Qualification for the UEFA Cup first round
4	Everton	42	17	17	8	52	40	+12	51	Qualification for the UEFA Cup first round
5	Leeds United	42	18	14	10	70	52	+18	50	Qualification for the UEFA Cup first round
6	Ipswich Town	42	20	9	13	63	49	+14	49	Qualification for the UEFA Cup first round
7	Arsenal	42	17	14	11	61	48	+13	48	Qualification for the European Cup Winners' Cup first round (Note: Arsenal qualified for the European Cup Winners' Cup first round as the 1978–79 FA Cup winners.)
8	Aston Villa	42	15	16	11	59	49	+10	46	
9	Manchester United	42	15	15	12	60	63	−3	45	
10	Coventry City	42	14	16	12	58	68	−10	44	
11	Tottenham Hotspur	42	13	15	14	48	61	−13	41	
12	Middlesbrough	42	15	10	17	57	50	+7	40	
13	Bristol City	42	15	10	17	47	51	−4	40	
14	Southampton	42	12	16	14	47	53	−6	40	
15	Manchester City	42	13	13	16	58	56	+2	39	
16	Norwich City	42	7	23	12	51	57	−6	37	
17	Bolton Wanderers	42	12	11	19	54	75	−21	35	
18	Wolverhampton Wanderers	42	13	8	21	44	68	−24	34	
19	Derby County	42	10	11	21	44	71	−27	31	
20	Queens Park Rangers (R)	42	6	13	23	45	73	−28	25	Relegation to the Second Division
21	Birmingham City (R)	42	6	10	26	37	64	−27	22	Relegation to the Second Division
22	Chelsea (R)	42	5	10	27	44	92	−48	20	Relegation to the Second Division

Source: World Football
Rules for classification: 1) Points; 2) Goal difference; 3) Goals scored
(C) Champions; (R) Relegated

=== Results ===
Home \ Away	ARS	AST	BIR	BOL	BRI	CHE	COV	DER	EVE	IPS	LEE	LIV	MCI	MUN	MID	NWC	NOT	QPR	SOU	TOT	WBA	WOL
Arsenal		1–1	3–1	1–0	2–0	5–2	1–1	2–0	2–2	4–1	2–2	1–0	1–1	1–1	0–0	1–1	2–1	5–1	1–0	1–0	1–2	0–1
Aston Villa	5–1		1–0	3–0	2–0	2–1	1–1	3–3	1–1	2–2	2–2	3–1	1–1	2–2	0–2	1–1	1–2	3–1	1–1	2–3	0–1	1–0
Birmingham City	0–0	0–1		3–0	1–1	1–1	0–0	1–1	1–3	1–1	0–1	0–3	1–2	5–1	1–3	1–0	0–2	3–1	2–2	1–0	1–1	1–1
Bolton Wanderers	4–2	0–0	2–2		1–2	2–1	0–0	2–1	3–1	2–3	3–1	1–4	2–2	3–0	0–0	3–2	0–1	2–1	2–0	1–3	0–1	3–1
Bristol City	1–3	1–0	2–1	4–1		3–1	5–0	1–0	2–2	3–1	0–0	1–0	1–1	1–2	1–1	1–1	1–3	2–0	3–1	0–0	1–0	0–1
Chelsea	1–1	0–1	2–1	4–3	0–0		1–3	1–1	0–1	2–3	0–3	0–0	1–4	0–1	2–1	3–3	1–3	1–3	1–2	1–3	1–3	1–2
Coventry City	1–1	1–1	2–1	2–2	3–2	3–2		4–2	3–2	2–2	0–0	0–0	0–3	4–3	2–1	4–1	0–0	1–0	4–0	1–3	1–3	3–0
Derby County	2–0	0–0	2–1	3–0	0–1	1–0	0–2		0–0	0–1	0–1	0–2	1–1	1–3	0–3	1–1	1–2	2–1	2–1	2–2	3–2	4–1
Everton	1–0	1–1	1–0	1–0	4–1	3–2	3–3	2–1		0–1	1–1	1–0	1–0	3–0	2–0	2–2	1–1	2–1	0–0	1–1	0–2	2–0
Ipswich Town	2–0	0–2	3–0	3–0	0–1	5–1	1–1	2–1	0–1		2–3	0–3	2–1	3–0	2–1	1–1	1–1	2–1	0–0	2–1	0–1	3–1
Leeds United	0–1	1–0	3–0	5–1	1–1	2–1	1–0	4–0	1–0	1–1		0–3	1–1	2–3	3–1	2–2	1–2	4–3	4–0	1–2	1–3	3–0
Liverpool	3–0	3–0	1–0	3–0	1–0	2–0	1–0	5–0	1–1	2–0	1–1		1–0	2–0	2–0	6–0	2–0	2–1	2–0	7–0	2–1	2–0
Manchester City	1–1	2–3	3–1	2–1	2–0	2–3	2–0	1–2	0–0	1–2	3–0	1–4		0–3	1–0	2–2	0–0	3–1	1–2	2–0	2–2	3–1
Manchester United	0–2	1–1	1–0	1–2	1–3	1–1	0–0	0–0	1–1	2–0	4–1	0–3	1–0		3–2	1–0	1–1	2–0	1–1	2–0	3–5	3–2
Middlesbrough	2–3	2–0	2–1	1–1	0–0	7–2	1–2	3–1	1–2	0–0	1–0	0–1	2–0	2–2		2–0	1–3	0–2	2–0	1–0	1–1	2–0
Norwich City	0–0	1–2	4–0	0–0	3–0	2–0	1–0	3–0	0–1	0–1	2–2	1–4	1–1	2–2	1–0		1–1	1–1	3–1	2–2	1–1	0–0
Nottingham Forest	2–1	4–0	1–0	1–1	2–0	6–0	3–0	1–1	0–0	1–0	0–0	0–0	3–1	1–1	2–2	2–1		0–0	1–0	1–1	0–0	3–1
Queens Park Rangers	1–2	1–0	1–3	1–3	1–0	0–0	5–1	2–2	1–1	0–4	1–4	1–3	2–1	1–1	1–1	0–0	0–0		0–1	2–2	0–1	3–3
Southampton	2–0	2–0	1–0	2–2	2–0	0–0	4–0	1–2	3–0	1–2	2–2	1–1	1–0	1–1	2–1	2–2	0–0	1–1		3–3	1–1	3–2
Tottenham Hotspur	0–5	1–4	1–0	2–0	1–0	2–2	1–1	2–0	1–1	1–0	1–2	0–0	0–3	1–1	1–2	0–0	1–3	1–1	0–0		1–0	1–0
West Bromwich Albion	1–1	1–1	1–0	4–0	3–1	1–0	7–1	2–1	1–0	2–1	1–2	1–1	4–0	1–0	2–0	2–2	0–1	2–1	1–0	0–1		1–1
Wolverhampton Wanderers	1–0	0–4	2–1	1–1	2–0	0–1	1–1	4–0	1–0	1–3	1–1	0–1	1–1	2–4	1–3	1–0	1–0	1–0	2–0	3–2	0–3	

Updated to match(es) played on unknown. Source: Ian Laschke: Rothmans Book of Football League Records 1888–89 to 1978–79. Macdonald and Jane’s, London & Sydney, 1980.
Legend: Blue = home team win; Yellow = draw; Red = away team win.

=== Managerial changes ===
Team	Outgoing manager	Manner of departure	Date of vacancy	Position in table	Incoming manager	Date of appointment
Leeds United	(England) Jimmy Armfield	Sacked	30 June 1978	Pre-season	(Scotland) Jock Stein	21 August 1978
Queens Park Rangers	(England) Frank Sibley	Mutual consent	11 July 1978	Pre-season	(England) Steve Burtenshaw	10 August 1978
Leeds United	(Scotland) Jock Stein	Signed by Scotland	4 October 1978	11th	(England) Jimmy Adamson	25 October 1978
Wolverhampton Wanderers	(England) Sammy Chung	Sacked	8 November 1978	21st	(England) John Barnwell	20 November 1978
Chelsea	(England) Ken Shellito	Sacked	13 December 1978	22nd	(Northern Ireland) Danny Blanchflower	14 December 1978

=== Maps ===
Locations of the Football League First Division London teams 1978–1979
Locations of the Football League First Division 1978–1979 teams

== Second Division ==
Second Division
- Season: 1978–79
- Champions: Crystal Palace
- Promoted: Crystal Palace; Brighton & Hove Albion; Stoke City
- Relegated: Sheffield United; Millwall; Blackburn Rovers
- Cup Winners' Cup: Wrexham
- Matches: 462
- Goals: 1,174 (2.54 per match)
- Top goalscorer: Pop Robson (24 goals)
- Biggest home win: Luton Town 7–1 Cardiff City (16 September 1978); Luton Town 6–0 Notts County (21 October 1978)
- Biggest away win: Millwall 1–4 Brighton & Hove Albion (2 September 1978); Cardiff City 1–4 Charlton Athletic (4 November 1978); Newcastle United 1–4 Sunderland (24 February 1979); Luton Town 1–4 West Ham United (26 February 1979); Blackburn Rovers 1–4 Cardiff City (28 February 1979); Charlton Athletic 1–4 Stoke City (14 April 1979); 0–3: 9 matches
- Highest scoring: Bristol Rovers 5–5 Charlton Athletic (18 November 1978)

Crystal Palace continued to excel under the management of Terry Venables as their team finished top of a hotly contested Second Division promotion race, a point ahead of Brighton (in the First Division for the first time) and Stoke City. Sunderland missed out on promotion by a single point.

Newcastle United and Leicester City surprisingly failed to feature in the Second Division promotion race.

Blackburn Rovers, Millwall and Sheffield United went down to the Third Division.

Pos	Team	Pld	W	D	L	GF	GA	GD	Pts	Qualification or relegation
1	Crystal Palace (C, P)	42	19	19	4	51	24	+27	57	Promotion to the First Division
2	Brighton & Hove Albion (P)	42	23	10	9	72	39	+33	56	Promotion to the First Division
3	Stoke City (P)	42	20	16	6	58	31	+27	56	Promotion to the First Division
4	Sunderland	42	22	11	9	70	44	+26	55	
5	West Ham United	42	18	14	10	70	39	+31	50	
6	Notts County	42	14	16	12	48	60	−12	44	
7	Preston North End	42	12	18	12	59	57	+2	42	
8	Newcastle United	42	17	8	17	51	55	−4	42	
9	Cardiff City	42	16	10	16	56	70	−14	42	
10	Fulham	42	13	15	14	50	47	+3	41	
11	Orient	42	15	10	17	51	51	0	40	
12	Cambridge United	42	12	16	14	44	52	−8	40	
13	Burnley	42	14	12	16	51	62	−11	40	
14	Oldham Athletic	42	13	13	16	52	61	−9	39	
15	Wrexham	42	12	14	16	45	42	+3	38	Qualification for the Cup Winners' Cup first round
16	Bristol Rovers	42	14	10	18	48	60	−12	38	
17	Leicester City	42	10	17	15	43	52	−9	37	
18	Luton Town	42	13	10	19	60	57	+3	36	
19	Charlton Athletic	42	11	13	18	60	69	−9	35	
20	Sheffield United (R)	42	11	12	19	52	69	−17	34	Relegation to the Third Division
21	Millwall (R)	42	11	10	21	42	61	−19	32	Relegation to the Third Division
22	Blackburn Rovers (R)	42	10	10	22	41	72	−31	30	Relegation to the Third Division

Rules for classification: 1) Points; 2) Goal difference; 3) Goals scored
(C) Champions; (P) Promoted; (R) Relegated

=== Results ===
Home \ Away	BLB	B&HA	BRR	BUR	CAM	CAR	CHA	CRY	FUL	LEI	LUT	MIL	NEW	NTC	OLD	ORI	PNE	SHU	STK	SUN	WHU	WRE
Blackburn Rovers		1–1	0–2	1–2	1–0	1–4	1–2	1–1	2–1	1–1	0–0	1–1	1–3	3–4	0–2	3–0	0–1	2–0	2–2	1–1	1–0	1–1
Brighton & Hove Albion	2–1		3–0	2–1	0–2	5–0	2–0	0–0	3–0	3–1	3–1	3–0	2–0	0–0	1–0	2–0	5–1	2–0	1–1	2–0	1–2	2–1
Bristol Rovers	4–1	1–2		2–0	2–0	4–2	5–5	0–1	3–1	1–1	2–0	0–3	2–0	2–2	0–0	2–1	0–1	2–1	0–0	0–0	0–1	2–1
Burnley	2–1	3–0	2–0		1–1	0–0	2–1	2–1	5–3	2–2	2–1	0–1	1–0	2–1	1–0	0–1	1–1	1–1	0–3	1–2	3–2	0–0
Cambridge United	0–1	0–0	1–1	2–2		5–0	1–1	0–0	1–0	1–1	0–0	2–1	0–0	0–1	3–3	3–1	1–0	1–0	0–1	0–2	0–0	1–0
Cardiff City	2–0	3–1	2–0	1–1	1–0		1–4	2–2	2–0	1–0	2–1	2–1	2–1	2–3	1–3	1–0	2–2	4–0	1–3	1–1	0–0	1–0
Charlton Athletic	2–0	0–3	3–0	1–1	2–3	1–1		1–1	0–0	1–0	1–2	2–4	4–1	1–1	2–0	0–2	1–1	3–1	1–4	1–2	0–0	1–1
Crystal Palace	3–0	3–1	0–1	2–0	1–1	2–0	1–0		0–1	3–1	3–1	0–0	1–0	2–0	1–0	1–1	0–0	3–1	1–1	1–1	1–1	1–0
Fulham	1–2	0–1	3–0	0–0	5–1	2–2	3–1	0–0		3–0	1–0	1–0	1–3	1–1	1–0	2–2	5–3	2–0	2–0	2–2	0–0	0–1
Leicester City	1–1	4–1	0–0	2–1	1–1	1–2	0–3	1–1	1–0		3–0	0–0	2–1	0–1	2–0	5–3	1–1	0–1	1–1	1–2	1–2	1–1
Luton Town	2–1	1–1	3–2	4–1	1–1	7–1	3–0	0–1	2–0	0–1		2–2	2–0	6–0	6–1	2–1	1–2	1–1	0–0	0–3	1–4	2–1
Millwall	1–1	1–4	0–3	0–2	2–0	2–0	0–2	0–3	0–0	2–0	0–2		2–1	0–1	2–3	2–0	0–2	1–1	3–0	0–1	2–1	2–2
Newcastle United	3–1	1–3	3–0	3–1	1–0	3–0	5–3	1–0	0–0	1–0	1–0	1–0		1–2	1–1	0–0	4–3	1–3	2–0	1–4	0–3	2–0
Notts County	2–1	1–0	2–1	1–1	1–1	1–0	1–1	0–0	1–1	0–1	3–1	1–1	1–2		0–0	1–0	0–0	4–1	0–1	1–1	1–0	1–1
Oldham Athletic	5–0	1–3	3–1	2–0	4–1	2–1	0–3	0–0	0–2	2–1	2–0	4–1	1–3	3–3		0–0	2–0	1–1	1–1	0–0	2–2	1–0
Orient	2–0	3–3	1–1	2–1	3–0	2–2	2–1	0–1	1–0	0–1	3–2	2–1	2–0	3–0	0–0		2–0	1–1	0–1	3–0	0–2	0–1
Preston North End	4–1	1–0	1–1	2–2	0–2	2–1	6–1	2–3	2–2	4–0	2–2	0–0	0–0	1–1	1–1	1–1		2–2	0–1	3–1	0–0	2–1
Sheffield United	0–1	0–1	1–0	4–0	3–3	2–1	2–1	0–2	1–1	2–2	1–1	0–2	1–0	5–1	4–2	1–2	0–1		0–0	3–2	3–0	1–1
Stoke City	1–2	2–2	2–0	3–1	1–3	2–0	2–2	1–1	2–0	0–0	0–0	2–0	0–0	2–0	4–0	3–1	1–1	2–1		0–1	2–0	3–0
Sunderland	0–1	2–1	5–0	3–1	0–2	1–2	1–0	1–2	1–1	1–1	1–0	3–2	1–1	3–0	3–0	1–0	3–1	6–2	0–1		2–1	1–0
West Ham United	4–0	0–0	2–0	3–1	5–0	1–1	2–0	1–1	0–1	1–1	1–0	3–0	5–0	5–2	3–0	0–2	3–1	2–0	1–1	3–3		1–1
Wrexham	2–1	0–0	0–1	0–1	2–0	1–2	1–1	0–0	1–1	0–0	2–0	3–0	0–0	3–1	2–0	3–1	2–1	4–0	0–1	1–2	4–3	

Updated to match(es) played on unknown. Source: Ian Laschke: Rothmans Book of Football League Records 1888–89 to 1978–79. Macdonald and Jane’s, London & Sydney, 1980.
Legend: Blue = home team win; Yellow = draw; Red = away team win.

=== Maps ===
Locations of the Football League Second Division London teams 1978–1979
Locations of the Football League Second Division 1978–1979 teams

== Third Division ==
Football League Third Division
- Season: 1978–79
- Champions: Shrewsbury Town (1st title)
- Promoted: Swansea City, Watford
- Relegated: Lincoln City, Peterborough United, Tranmere Rovers, Walsall
- Matches: 552
- Goals: 1,388 (2.51 per match)
- Top goalscorer: Ross Jenkins (Watford), 29

Pos	Team	Pld	W	D	L	GF	GA	GD	Pts	Promotion or relegation
1	Shrewsbury Town (C, P)	46	21	19	6	61	41	+20	61	Promotion to the Second Division
2	Watford (P)	46	24	12	10	83	52	+31	60	Promotion to the Second Division
3	Swansea City (P)	46	24	12	10	83	61	+22	60	Promotion to the Second Division
4	Gillingham	46	21	17	8	65	42	+23	59	
5	Swindon Town	46	25	7	14	74	52	+22	57	
6	Carlisle United	46	15	22	9	53	42	+11	52	
7	Colchester United	46	17	17	12	60	55	+5	51	
8	Hull City	46	19	11	16	66	61	+5	49	
9	Exeter City	46	17	15	14	61	56	+5	49	
10	Brentford	46	19	9	18	53	49	+4	47	
11	Oxford United	46	14	18	14	44	50	−6	46	
12	Blackpool	46	18	9	19	61	59	+2	45	
13	Southend United	46	15	15	16	51	49	+2	45	
14	Sheffield Wednesday	46	13	19	14	53	53	0	45	
15	Plymouth Argyle	46	15	14	17	67	68	−1	44	
16	Chester	46	14	16	16	57	61	−4	44	
17	Rotherham United	46	17	10	19	49	55	−6	44	
18	Mansfield Town	46	12	19	15	51	52	−1	43	
19	Bury	46	11	20	15	59	65	−6	42	
20	Chesterfield	46	13	14	19	51	65	−14	40	
21	Peterborough United (R)	46	11	14	21	44	63	−19	36	Relegation to the Fourth Division
22	Walsall (R)	46	10	12	24	56	71	−15	32	Relegation to the Fourth Division
23	Tranmere Rovers (R)	46	6	16	24	45	78	−33	28	Relegation to the Fourth Division
24	Lincoln City (R)	46	7	11	28	41	88	−47	25	Relegation to the Fourth Division

Source: rsssf.com
(C) Champions; (P) Promoted; (R) Relegated

=== Results ===
Home \ Away	BLP	BRE	BRY	CRL	CHE	CHF	COL	EXE	GIL	HUL	LIN	MAN	OXF	PET	PLY	ROT	SHW	SHR	STD	SWA	SWI	TRA	WAL	WAT
Blackpool		0–1	1–2	3–1	3–0	0–0	2–1	1–1	2–0	3–1	2–0	2–0	1–0	0–0	0–0	1–2	0–1	5–0	1–2	1–3	5–2	2–0	2–1	1–1
Brentford	3–2		0–1	0–0	6–0	0–3	1–0	0–0	0–2	1–0	2–1	1–0	3–0	0–0	2–1	1–0	2–1	2–3	3–0	1–0	1–2	2–0	1–0	3–3
Bury	1–3	2–3		2–2	1–1	3–1	2–2	4–2	2–2	1–1	2–2	0–0	1–1	1–0	1–2	3–2	0–0	3–0	3–3	0–1	0–1	1–0	1–1	1–2
Carlisle United	1–1	1–0	1–2		1–1	1–1	4–0	1–1	1–0	2–2	2–0	1–0	0–1	4–1	1–1	1–1	0–0	1–1	0–0	2–0	2–0	2–0	1–0	1–0
Chester	4–2	3–1	1–1	1–2		3–0	2–2	3–0	1–1	2–1	5–1	1–1	4–1	1–1	0–0	0–1	2–2	0–0	0–1	2–0	2–0	1–1	2–1	2–1
Chesterfield	1–3	0–0	2–1	2–3	3–1		2–1	0–1	0–2	1–2	1–3	1–0	1–1	3–1	1–3	1–0	3–3	2–1	3–2	2–1	1–1	5–2	0–0	0–2
Colchester United	3–1	1–1	0–0	2–1	2–1	0–0		2–2	2–2	2–1	2–0	1–0	1–1	4–2	2–1	0–0	1–0	1–0	1–1	2–2	3–2	1–0	2–0	0–1
Exeter City	3–0	2–2	2–1	3–2	0–1	3–1	2–1		0–0	3–1	3–2	0–0	2–0	1–0	1–0	2–0	2–2	0–1	0–0	2–1	1–2	3–0	3–1	0–0
Gillingham	2–0	0–0	3–3	0–0	1–0	2–1	3–0	2–0		2–0	4–2	0–0	2–1	1–0	2–0	0–0	0–0	2–0	1–0	2–0	2–2	3–2	3–1	2–3
Hull City	0–0	1–0	4–1	1–1	3–0	1–1	1–0	1–0	0–1		0–0	3–0	0–1	1–1	2–1	1–0	1–1	1–1	2–0	2–2	1–1	2–1	4–1	4–0
Lincoln City	1–2	1–0	1–4	1–1	0–0	0–1	0–0	0–1	2–4	4–2		0–1	2–2	0–1	3–3	3–0	1–2	1–2	1–1	2–1	0–3	2–1	1–1	0–5
Mansfield Town	1–1	2–1	3–0	1–0	2–0	2–1	1–1	1–1	1–1	0–2	2–0		1–1	1–1	5–0	0–1	1–1	2–2	1–1	2–2	0–1	0–0	1–3	0–3
Oxford United	1–0	0–1	0–0	5–1	0–0	1–1	2–0	3–2	1–1	1–0	2–1	3–2		0–2	3–2	1–0	1–1	0–1	0–0	0–2	0–1	0–0	2–1	1–1
Peterborough United	1–2	3–1	2–2	0–0	2–1	0–0	1–2	1–1	1–1	3–0	0–1	1–2	1–1		2–1	1–1	2–0	0–2	0–1	2–0	2–1	1–0	0–3	0–1
Plymouth Argyle	0–0	2–1	3–0	2–0	2–2	1–1	1–1	4–2	2–1	3–4	2–1	1–4	0–1	3–2		2–0	2–0	1–1	1–1	2–2	2–0	2–2	1–0	1–1
Rotherham United	2–1	1–0	2–1	1–3	0–1	1–0	1–0	2–1	1–1	0–2	2–0	2–0	0–0	1–1	1–0		0–1	1–2	2–1	0–1	1–3	3–2	4–1	2–1
Sheffield Wednesday	2–0	1–0	0–0	0–0	0–0	4–0	0–0	2–1	2–1	2–3	0–0	1–2	1–1	3–0	2–3	2–1		0–0	3–2	0–0	2–1	1–2	0–2	2–3
Shrewsbury Town	2–0	1–0	1–0	0–0	1–0	1–1	2–0	4–1	1–1	1–0	2–0	2–2	0–0	2–0	2–0	3–1	2–2		2–0	3–0	0–0	2–1	1–1	1–1
Southend United	4–0	1–1	0–0	1–1	0–1	2–0	1–1	0–1	0–1	3–0	2–0	1–1	2–0	0–0	2–1	2–1	2–1	0–1		0–2	5–3	0–1	1–0	1–0
Swansea City	1–0	2–1	2–0	0–0	2–2	2–1	4–1	1–0	3–1	5–3	3–0	3–2	1–1	4–1	2–1	4–4	4–2	1–1	3–2		1–2	4–3	2–2	3–2
Swindon Town	0–1	2–0	2–1	0–0	2–0	1–0	1–2	1–1	3–1	2–0	6–0	1–0	2–0	3–1	1–3	1–0	3–0	2–1	1–0	0–1		4–1	4–1	2–0
Tranmere Rovers	0–2	0–1	0–0	1–1	6–2	1–1	1–5	2–2	1–1	1–3	0–0	1–2	1–0	1–0	2–1	1–1	1–1	2–2	1–2	1–2	1–1		0–0	1–1
Walsall	2–1	2–3	0–1	1–2	2–1	0–1	2–2	2–2	0–1	1–2	4–1	1–1	0–1	4–1	2–1	0–1	0–2	1–1	1–1	1–1	4–1	2–0		2–4
Watford	5–1	2–0	3–3	2–1	1–0	2–0	0–3	1–0	1–0	4–0	2–0	1–1	4–2	1–2	2–2	2–2	1–0	2–2	2–0	0–2	2–0	4–0	3–1	

Updated to match(es) played on unknown. Source: Ian Laschke: Rothmans Book of Football League Records 1888–89 to 1978–79. Macdonald and Jane’s, London & Sydney, 1980.
Legend: Blue = home team win; Yellow = draw; Red = away team win.

=== Maps ===
Locations of the Football League Third Division London teams 1978–1979
Locations of the Football League Third Division teams 1978–1979

== Fourth Division ==
Football League Fourth Division
- Season: 1978–79
- Champions: Reading (1st title)
- Promoted: Barnsley, Grimsby Town, Wimbledon
- Failed re-election: None
- New club in the league: Wigan Athletic
- Matches: 552
- Goals: 1,409 (2.55 per match)
- Top goalscorer: John Dungworth (Aldershot), 26

Pos	Team	Pld	W	D	L	GF	GA	GD	Pts	Promotion
1	Reading (C, P)	46	26	13	7	76	35	+41	65	Promotion to the Third Division
2	Grimsby Town (P)	46	26	9	11	82	49	+33	61	Promotion to the Third Division
3	Wimbledon (P)	46	25	11	10	78	46	+32	61	Promotion to the Third Division
4	Barnsley (P)	46	24	13	9	73	42	+31	61	Promotion to the Third Division
5	Aldershot	46	20	17	9	63	47	+16	57	
6	Wigan Athletic	46	21	13	12	63	48	+15	55	
7	Portsmouth	46	20	12	14	62	48	+14	52	
8	Newport County	46	21	10	15	66	55	+11	52	
9	Huddersfield Town	46	18	11	17	57	53	+4	47	
10	York City	46	18	11	17	51	55	−4	47	
11	Torquay United	46	19	8	19	58	65	−7	46	
12	Scunthorpe United	46	17	11	18	54	60	−6	45	
13	Hartlepool United	46	13	18	15	57	66	−9	44	
14	Hereford United	46	15	13	18	53	53	0	43	
15	Bradford City	46	17	9	20	62	68	−6	43	
16	Port Vale	46	14	14	18	57	70	−13	42	
17	Stockport County	46	14	12	20	58	60	−2	40	
18	Bournemouth	46	14	11	21	47	48	−1	39	
19	Northampton Town	46	15	9	22	64	76	−12	39	
20	Rochdale	46	15	9	22	47	64	−17	39	
21	Darlington	46	11	15	20	49	66	−17	37	Re-elected
22	Doncaster Rovers	46	13	11	22	50	73	−23	37	Re-elected
23	Halifax Town	46	9	8	29	39	72	−33	26	Re-elected
24	Crewe Alexandra	46	6	14	26	43	90	−47	26	Re-elected

(C) Champions; (P) Promoted

=== Results ===
Home \ Away	BOU	ALD	BAR	BRA	CRE	DAR	DON	GRI	HAL	HAR	HER	HUD	NPC	NOR	POR	PTV	REA	ROC	SCU	STP	TOR	WIG	WDN	YOR
AFC Bournemouth		0–1	0–2	1–0	0–1	2–2	7–1	0–0	1–0	0–1	1–1	2–0	3–1	0–0	3–1	3–1	0–0	3–1	0–0	3–1	1–0	2–1	1–2	1–2
Aldershot	1–0		1–0	6–0	3–0	1–1	2–1	2–0	1–0	1–1	2–0	1–0	2–3	2–0	0–2	1–1	2–2	1–0	2–0	3–2	1–0	1–0	1–1	1–0
Barnsley	1–0	2–0		0–1	3–1	1–1	3–0	2–1	4–2	1–0	2–1	1–0	1–0	1–1	1–1	6–2	3–1	0–3	4–1	4–4	1–2	0–0	3–1	3–0
Bradford City	2–1	0–2	1–2		6–0	0–0	1–0	1–3	3–0	1–2	2–1	1–1	1–3	3–0	2–0	2–3	2–3	1–0	1–1	1–1	3–1	1–1	1–0	2–1
Crewe Alexandra	1–0	1–1	0–2	1–2		1–1	2–4	0–3	1–0	0–1	0–0	3–3	0–1	2–4	0–0	1–5	0–2	1–2	0–2	2–2	6–2	1–1	1–2	0–1
Darlington	0–0	2–1	0–0	1–1	1–1		3–2	0–1	2–1	0–1	2–1	1–0	1–0	0–0	2–0	4–0	1–2	0–2	2–2	0–1	1–2	1–1	1–1	0–1
Doncaster Rovers	1–1	1–1	2–2	2–0	2–0	2–3		0–1	1–1	0–0	1–0	0–2	0–0	2–0	2–3	1–3	2–2	1–0	0–0	2–0	1–0	0–1	1–0	1–2
Grimsby Town	1–0	0–0	2–0	5–1	2–2	7–2	3–4		2–1	0–1	1–1	2–1	1–0	4–3	1–0	1–0	1–2	4–0	1–1	2–1	3–0	3–1	2–2	3–0
Halifax Town	0–2	1–1	0–2	2–0	0–0	0–2	0–0	1–2		2–4	1–0	2–3	1–2	2–2	2–0	0–3	0–0	2–1	2–3	2–1	1–0	1–2	2–1	0–1
Hartlepool United	0–0	2–2	1–1	2–2	2–2	0–2	3–4	1–0	3–1		2–1	2–0	0–0	2–0	1–1	1–2	0–0	5–1	1–1	1–3	3–2	1–1	1–1	1–1
Hereford United	0–0	1–1	1–1	3–1	6–1	1–0	2–0	0–1	2–2	1–0		3–0	0–3	4–3	0–1	1–0	0–0	2–2	3–1	1–0	3–1	0–0	0–0	1–0
Huddersfield Town	2–1	0–0	1–0	0–0	0–0	2–2	2–1	2–0	2–0	2–0	2–3		0–1	1–0	2–0	3–2	1–1	1–0	3–2	0–0	1–1	1–1	3–0	1–0
Newport County	2–0	1–2	1–1	2–4	1–2	2–1	3–0	1–1	2–0	3–2	4–1	2–1		2–1	1–2	1–0	3–2	0–0	2–0	1–2	1–1	2–1	1–3	1–1
Northampton Town	4–2	2–3	0–1	1–0	3–1	4–1	3–0	1–2	2–1	1–1	2–1	2–3	3–1		0–2	1–0	2–2	1–0	1–0	2–2	1–2	2–4	1–1	1–0
Portsmouth	1–1	1–1	0–1	0–1	3–0	3–0	4–0	1–3	3–1	3–0	1–0	1–0	2–1	1–0		2–0	4–0	1–1	0–0	1–1	1–0	1–0	0–0	1–1
Port Vale	1–2	1–1	3–2	2–1	2–2	2–1	1–3	1–1	0–1	2–0	1–1	1–0	1–1	2–2	0–0		0–3	1–1	2–2	2–1	1–2	2–1	1–0	0–0
Reading	1–0	4–0	1–0	3–0	3–0	1–0	3–0	4–0	1–0	3–1	3–0	1–1	2–1	5–1	2–0	0–0		2–0	0–1	3–3	1–0	2–0	1–0	3–0
Rochdale	2–1	1–1	0–3	1–0	2–1	2–1	2–0	2–5	1–1	1–1	0–2	0–2	1–0	4–1	0–2	0–1	1–0		1–0	2–0	1–0	0–2	0–0	1–2
Scunthorpe United	1–0	2–0	0–1	3–2	0–1	1–0	0–0	2–1	1–0	3–1	4–2	3–1	2–3	0–3	2–2	2–0	0–3	0–4		1–0	2–2	0–1	2–0	2–3
Stockport County	1–0	2–2	0–0	1–0	4–3	3–0	0–1	2–1	1–2	4–0	0–2	3–1	1–1	2–1	4–2	0–0	0–0	3–0	0–2		0–1	0–1	0–1	2–0
Torquay United	0–1	2–1	3–2	1–2	3–0	1–0	2–1	3–1	2–0	4–1	1–0	2–1	2–0	0–1	2–1	2–2	1–1	1–1	0–1	1–0		1–1	1–6	3–0
Wigan Athletic	1–0	3–2	1–1	1–3	1–0	2–2	1–0	0–3	1–0	2–2	0–0	2–1	2–3	2–0	2–0	5–3	3–0	3–0	1–0	2–0	3–1		1–2	1–1
Wimbledon	4–0	3–1	1–1	2–1	1–1	2–0	3–2	0–1	2–1	3–1	2–0	2–1	0–0	4–1	2–4	1–0	1–0	3–2	3–1	2–0	5–0	2–1		2–1
York City	2–1	1–1	0–1	2–2	1–0	5–2	1–1	0–0	2–0	1–1	1–0	1–3	1–2	1–0	5–3	4–0	0–1	2–1	1–0	1–0	0–0	0–1	1–4	

Updated to match(es) played on unknown. Source: Ian Laschke: Rothmans Book of Football League Records 1888–89 to 1978–79. Macdonald and Jane’s, London & Sydney, 1980.
Legend: Blue = home team win; Yellow = draw; Red = away team win.

=== Maps ===
Locations of the Football League Fourth Division teams 1978–1979
Locations of the Football League Fourth Division London teams 1978–1979

== Attendances ==
=== Division One ===
No.	Club	Average	Highest	Lowest
1	Manchester United	46,430	56,139	33,678
2	Liverpool FC	46,407	52,352	33,754
3	Arsenal FC	36,371	53,896	24,288
4	Manchester City FC	36,203	46,710	27,366
5	Everton FC	35,456	53,141	23,048
6	Tottenham Hotspur FC	34,902	50,541	21,560
7	Aston Villa FC	32,838	44,029	21,884
8	Nottingham Forest FC	29,587	41,898	20,388
9	Leeds United FC	27,633	41,324	20,121
10	West Bromwich Albion FC	26,517	35,166	17,499
11	Chelsea FC	24,782	42,328	12,479
12	Bolton Wanderers FC	23,200	35,200	17,394
13	Coventry City FC	22,638	28,585	15,083
14	Bristol City FC	22,306	30,191	13,559
15	Ipswich Town FC	21,673	28,179	16,070
16	Derby County FC	21,555	30,156	15,227
17	Southampton FC	21,330	24,252	18,957
18	Wolverhampton Wanderers FC	20,796	30,857	14,250
19	Birmingham City FC	20,164	36,145	12,168
20	Middlesbrough FC	18,459	32,214	12,822
21	Norwich City FC	17,874	27,031	12,401
22	Queens Park Rangers FC	16,287	26,626	9,600

=== Division Two ===
No.	Club	Average	Highest	Lowest
1	West Ham United FC	25,778	35,802	21,269
2	Sunderland AFC	25,454	36,526	16,829
3	Crystal Palace FC	23,294	51,482	15,183
4	Brighton & Hove Albion FC	22,145	33,028	16,216
5	Newcastle United FC	20,494	34,733	7,134
6	Stoke City FC	19,125	24,912	15,176
7	Sheffield United FC	16,339	23,118	11,913
8	Leicester City FC	14,187	20,740	10,363
9	Preston North End FC	12,117	17,829	8,906
10	Wrexham AFC	11,519	20,111	6,136
11	Burnley FC	10,748	23,133	5,837
12	Fulham FC	10,135	26,556	6,067
13	Charlton Athletic FC	9,563	22,816	5,480
14	Notts County FC	9,281	21,571	4,374
15	Cardiff City FC	9,246	14,851	5,542
16	Luton Town FC	8,792	14,205	6,002
17	Blackburn Rovers FC	8,640	17,790	4,684
18	Bristol Rovers FC	7,593	12,418	5,410
19	Leyton Orient FC	7,323	19,945	4,340
20	Oldham Athletic FC	7,045	11,284	4,637
21	Millwall FC	7,002	11,968	2,830
22	Cambridge United FC	6,849	11,406	4,663

=== Division Three ===
No.	Club	Average	Highest	Lowest
1	Watford FC	14,434	26,347	10,568
2	Swansea City AFC	13,746	22,838	8,086
3	Sheffield Wednesday FC	10,860	13,930	7,444
4	Swindon Town FC	7,975	17,216	4,558
5	Plymouth Argyle FC	7,526	13,406	4,686
6	Brentford FC	7,455	13,873	5,140
7	Gillingham FC	7,143	14,902	4,157
8	Southend United FC	6,610	13,703	3,255
9	Shrewsbury Town FC	6,099	14,441	2,346
10	Blackpool FC	5,647	9,403	3,136
11	Hull City AFC	5,238	10,336	3,418
12	Carlisle United FC	5,204	8,479	3,806
13	Mansfield Town FC	5,151	11,365	3,671
14	Chesterfield FC	4,884	13,322	2,802
15	Oxford United FC	4,647	10,649	3,164
16	Peterborough United FC	4,640	8,048	1,875
17	Rotherham United FC	4,466	13,746	1,996
18	Exeter City FC	4,408	8,022	3,195
19	Chester City FC	4,052	8,855	1,956
20	Walsall FC	4,047	6,423	2,573
21	Bury FC	3,782	5,852	2,298
22	Colchester United FC	3,419	6,317	2,311
23	Lincoln City FC	3,168	7,007	1,571
24	Tranmere Rovers	2,179	5,587	984

=== Division Four ===
No.	Club	Average	Highest	Lowest
1	Barnsley FC	11,048	21,261	5,828
2	Portsmouth FC	10,123	13,958	5,863
3	Reading FC	7,616	15,302	4,481
4	Wigan Athletic FC	6,701	9,427	4,459
5	Grimsby Town FC	6,528	16,138	3,903
6	Aldershot Town FC	4,163	8,967	2,560
7	Stockport County FC	4,146	9,054	2,190
8	Bradford City AFC	3,924	8,341	1,950
9	AFC Bournemouth	3,759	10,058	2,285
10	Newport County AFC	3,731	6,930	2,235
11	Wimbledon FC	3,712	8,084	2,374
12	Huddersfield Town AFC	3,649	9,382	1,680
13	Hereford United FC	3,369	5,674	2,351
14	Port Vale FC	3,287	5,226	2,160
15	Doncaster Rovers FC	3,000	9,380	1,539
16	Hartlepool United FC	2,997	5,956	1,769
17	York City FC	2,936	6,900	1,970
18	Northampton Town FC	2,895	4,694	1,572
19	Scunthorpe United FC	2,721	8,165	1,339
20	Torquay United FC	2,669	4,964	1,585
21	Crewe Alexandra FC	1,995	4,604	1,121
22	Halifax Town AFC	1,821	5,654	980
23	Darlington FC	1,807	3,513	1,086
24	Rochdale AFC	1,767	3,627	976

== See also ==
- 1978-79 in English football
