= Des Harlock =

Welsh footballer

Personal information
- Date of birth: 20 December 1922
- Place of birth: Blaenau Ffestiniog, Wales
- Date of death: 6 April 1981 (aged 58)
- Place of death: Liverpool, England
- Position: Outside right

Senior career*
Years	Team	Apps	(Gls)
?–1945	Liverpool	0	(0)
1945–1954	Tranmere Rovers	150	(17)
1954–?	Stafford Rangers		
1956–1958	Macclesfield Town	58	(11)
- * Club domestic league appearances and goals

Des Harlock (20 December 1922 – 6 April 1981) was a Welsh footballer who played as an outside right for Liverpool, Tranmere Rovers, Stafford Rangers and Macclesfield Town. He made 158 appearances for Tranmere, scoring 18 goals.
