= East London derby =

Rivalry between three football teams

- Location: East London
- Teams: Dagenham & Redbridge; Leyton Orient; West Ham United
- First meeting: 8 December 1900
- Latest meeting: Leyton Orient 1–0 Dagenham & Redbridge; 2018–19 National League (1 January 2019)
- Stadiums: Brisbane Road (Leyton); London Stadium (West Ham); Victoria Road (Dagenham & Redbridge)

Statistics
- Total meetings: 50
- Most wins: West Ham United (20)
- All-time series: West Ham (20); Leyton Orient (11); Dagenham & Redbridge (5)
- Largest victory: Orient 0–4 West Ham United (1 January 1980)

The East London derby is a football match that takes place between any two of Dagenham & Redbridge, Leyton Orient and West Ham United. This derby rarely takes place because the clubs are usually in different leagues.

All three clubs were part of the county of Essex before 1965, since when they have been part of the county of Greater London. Leyton Orient's original home was in Clapton, which was just over the border in the County of London, before they moved to Leyton in 1937.

The last time West Ham United and Leyton Orient shared a competitive meeting was on 31 January 1987 in the FA Cup which West Ham won 4–1 with their goals coming from McAvennie, Cottee, Keen and Parris. West Ham and Dagenham & Redbridge have never met since the latter was formed in 1992 from the merger of Redbridge Forest and Dagenham. However, Leyton Orient and Dagenham & Redbridge meet occasionally in the lower leagues. They played each other in the National League in the 2017–18 season and the 2018-19 season.

== Overall table ==
Team	Pld	W	D	L	F	A	%
West Ham United	28	19	4	5	49	23	67.86
Leyton Orient	45	13	8	24	53	73	28.89
Dagenham & Redbridge	17	5	4	8	24	30	29.41
Total	90	37	16	37	126	126	—

== West Ham United vs Leyton Orient ==
There is very little current rivalry between Leyton Orient and West Ham, mainly because they have been in different divisions for over 44 years. The last time that the two clubs ever shared a division was in the old Second Division in the season 1980–81.

=== Matches ===
Statistics

Competition	Played	Orient wins	Draws	West Ham wins	Orient goals	West Ham goals
League	20	5	1	14	14	31
FA Cup	7	0	3	4	8	16
League Cup	1	0	0	1	1	2
Total	28	5	4	19	23	49

All-time result
League

Leyton Orient vs West Ham United
Season	Competition	Date	Venue	Score	Att.
1919–20	Division 2	28 February 1920	Millfields Road	1–0	25,000
1920–21	Division 2	15 January 1921	Millfields Road	0–1	20,000
1921–22	Division 2	17 April 1922	Millfields Road	0–0	30,000
1922–23	Division 2	25 November 1922	Millfields Road	0–2	20,000
1956–57	Division 2	6 October 1956	Brisbane Road	1–2	24,685
1957–58	Division 2	20 February 1958	Brisbane Road	1–4	25,284
1962–63	Division 1	1 September 1962	Brisbane Road	2–0	23,918
1978–79	Division 2	14 April 1979	Brisbane Road	0–2	17,517
1979–80	Division 2	1 January 1980	Brisbane Road	0–4	23,885
1980–81	Division 2	18 April 1981	Brisbane Road	0–2	14,592

Orient wins	Draws	West Ham wins
2	1	7

West Ham United vs Leyton Orient
Date	Venue	Score	Att.
4 March 1920	Upton Park	0–1	15,000
22 January 1921	Upton Park	1–0	27,864
14 April 1922	Upton Park	1–2	30,000
18 November 1922	Upton Park	1–0	20,000
16 February 1957	Upton Park	2–1	36,318
5 October 1957	Upton Park	3–2	25,990
11 May 1963	Upton Park	2–0	16,745
26 December 1978	Upton Park	0–2	29,220
5 April 1980	Upton Park	2–0	22,066
27 December 1980	Upton Park	2–1	34,408

West Ham wins	Draws	Orient wins
7	0	3

Cup

Season	Date	Venue	Score	Competition	Round	Att.
1900–01	8 December 1900	Memorial Grounds	1–1	FA Cup	Fifth qualifying round	10,000
1900–01	12 December 1900	Millfields Road	2–3	FA Cup	Fifth qualifying round replay	5,000
1963–64	25 September 1963	Upton Park	2–1	League Cup	Second round	11,800
1963–64	25 January 1964	Brisbane Road	1–1	FA Cup	Fourth round	34,345
1963–64	29 January 1964	Upton Park	3–0	FA Cup	Fourth round replay	35,383
1979–80	26 January 1980	Brisbane Road	2–3	FA Cup	Fourth round	21,521
1986–87	10 January 1987	Brisbane Road	1–1	FA Cup	Third round	19,225
1986–87	31 January 1987	Upton Park	4–1	FA Cup	Third round replay	19,424

West Ham	Draws	Orient wins
5	3	0

== Dagenham & Redbridge vs Leyton Orient ==
The rivalry between Dagenham & Redbridge and Leyton Orient started very recently, dating back to 1992–93 FA Cup, where Orient won in the first round 4–5 at Dagenham. A total of 13 matches have been played to date with Orient having the upper hand with six victories against five for Dagenham, with two games ending in a draw.

=== Matches ===
Statistics

Competition	Played	Dagenham & Redbridge wins	Draws	Leyton Orient wins	Dagenham & Redbridge goals	Leyton Orient goals
League	8	2	2	4	8	12
FA Cup	4	0	1	3	7	12
EFL Trophy	5	3	1	1	9	6
Total	17	5	4	8	24	30

All-time result
League

Dagenham & Redbridge vs Leyton Orient
Season	Competition	Date	Venue	Score	Att.
2010–11	League One	4 September 2010	Victoria Road	2–0	4,195
2015–16	League Two	15 August 2015	Victoria Road	1–3	3,336
2017–18	National League	1 January 2018	Victoria Road	0–0	–
2018–19	National League	26 December 2018	Victoria Road	2–1	3,694

Dagenham wins	Draws	Orient wins
2	1	1

Leyton Orient vs Dagenham & Redbridge
Date	Venue	Score	Att.
22 March 2011	Brisbane Road	1–1	4,581
16 April 2016	Brisbane Road	3–2	5,696
26 December 2017	Brisbane Road	2–0	–
1 January 2019	Brisbane Road	1–0	6,001

Orient wins	Draws	Dagenham wins
3	1	0

Cup

Season	Date	Venue	Score	Competition	Round	Att.
1992–93	14 November 1992	Victoria Road	4–5	FA Cup	First round	
2001–02	16 October 2001	Victoria Road	3–2	EFL Trophy	First round	2,642
2003–04	15 October 2003	Victoria Road	4–1	EFL Trophy	First round	1,857
2004–05	13 November 2004	Brisbane Road	3–1	FA Cup	First round	4,155
2007–08	9 October 2007	Brisbane Road	0–1	EFL Trophy	Second round	2,397
2010–11	6 November 2010	Victoria Road	1–1	FA Cup	First round	3,378
2010–11	16 November 2010	Brisbane Road	3–1	FA Cup	First round replay	2,901
2011–12	7 September 2011	Brisbane Road	1–1 (Note: Dagenham & Redbridge won 14–13 on penalties.)	EFL Trophy	First round	1,420
2014–15	7 October 2014	Victoria Road	2–0	EFL Trophy	Second round	2,318

Dagenham wins	Draws	Orient wins
3	2	4
