= Ken Knighton =

English footballer, coach, and manager (born 1944)

Personal information
- Full name: Kenneth Knighton
- Date of birth: 20 February 1944 (age 82)
- Place of birth: Darton, England
- Height: 5 ft 9 in (1.75 m)
- Position: Defender

Senior career*
Years	Team	Apps	(Gls)
1960–1966	Wolverhampton Wanderers	16	(0)
1966–1967	Oldham Athletic	45	(4)
1967–1969	Preston North End	62	(3)
1969–1971	Blackburn Rovers	70	(11)
1971–1973	Hull City	80	(9)
1973–1976	Sheffield Wednesday	76	(2)
Total		349	(29)

Managerial career
- 1979–1981: Sunderland
- 1981–1983: Orient
- 1984–1985: Dagenham
- Trowbridge Town
- * Club domestic league appearances and goals

Kenneth Knighton (born 20 February 1944) is an English former footballer, coach and manager. He is most well known for his spell as manager at Sunderland during which time the club was promoted to the First Division, and he also managed Football League club Orient and non-league clubs Dagenham and Trowbridge Town. As a player, he played as a defender for Wolverhampton Wanderers, Oldham Athletic, Preston North End, Blackburn Rovers, Hull City and Sheffield Wednesday.

== Playing career ==
Knighton was born in Darton. After playing Barnsley schoolboy football and amateur football for Wath Wanderers whilst working as a trainee miner, he joined Wolverhampton Wanderers as a non-contract player in August 1959. He became an apprentice at the club in August 1960 before turning professional in February 1961. He made 16 league appearances for Wolves prior to signing for Oldham Athletic in November 1966 for a fee of £12,000. He joined Preston North End for £35,000 in December 1967 before switching to Blackburn Rovers in July 1969 for £45,000. In 1969, Knighton was asked to tour New Zealand as part of an FA XI. He was sold to Hull City in March 1971 for £60,000 before joining Sheffield Wednesday two years later, where he would retire in January 1976.

== Coaching career ==
Following his retirement as a player, Knighton worked as a youth-team coach at Sheffield Wednesday and a first-team coach at Sunderland before becoming manager in June 1979. Considered a strict disciplinarian during his time as Sunderland manager, he won the club promotion to the First Division as Second Division runners-up in his debut season at the club. He was sacked towards the end of the following season after Tom Cowie took over as chairman. After briefly working as a scout for Manchester United, he became Orient manager in October 1981, but the club were relegated to the Third Division and Knighton was sacked in May 1983 when they struggled in the following season. He later worked as manager of Dagenham and Trowbridge Town.
