= Ernie Walley =

Welsh football coach (1931–2025)

Personal information
- Full name: Ernest Walley
- Date of birth: 7 April 1933
- Place of birth: Caernarfon, Wales
- Date of death: 6 February 2025 (aged 91)
- Position: Wing half

Youth career
- 1951–1955: Tottenham Hotspur

Senior career*
Years	Team	Apps	(Gls)
1955–1958	Tottenham Hotspur	5	(0)
1958–1959	Middlesbrough	8	(0)
1959–?	Crystal Palace	0	(0)
- Gravesend & Northfleet
- Stevenage Borough

Managerial career
- 1980: Crystal Palace (caretaker)
- 1983–1985: Barking
- 1992: Bangor City
- * Club domestic league appearances and goals

Ernest Walley (7 April 1933 – 6 February 2025) was a Welsh football player and coach.

== Playing career ==
Walley joined Tottenham Hotspur as a junior in May 1951, making five league appearances as a wing half before moving to Middlesbrough in 1958. After eight appearances for Middlesbrough he moved again to Crystal Palace, but failed to make a first team appearance before moving to Gravesend & Northfleet and subsequently Stevenage Borough.

== Coaching and managerial career ==
After retiring as a player Walley spent eight years as a coach at Arsenal before joining Crystal Palace in the same capacity in 1967. He became caretaker manager of Crystal Palace for six matches following the departure of Terry Venables in 1980. After the appointments of Malcolm Allison and subsequently Dario Gradi, Walley continued as a coach at Crystal Palace. He was later assistant manager to John Hollins at Chelsea during the mid-1980s, and reserve manager under Steve Harrison at Watford. His brother Tom played for Watford and Wales, and was a coach at Watford at the same time as Ernie. Ernie Walley subsequently managed Barking between December 1983 until January 1985, and later Bangor City for a short spell in 1992.

== Death ==
On 6 February 2025, it was announced that Walley had died at the age of 91.
