= 1983–84 Southampton F.C. season =

Southampton F.C.
1983–84 season
- Chairman: Alan Woodford
- Manager: Lawrie McMenemy
- Stadium: The Dell
- First Division: 2nd
- FA Cup: Semi-finals
- League Cup: Third round
- Top goalscorer: League: Steve Moran (21); All: Steve Moran (25)
- Highest home attendance: 21,141 v Tottenham; Hotspur (7 May 1984)
- Lowest home attendance: 12,483 v Carlisle United (25 October 1983)
- Average home league attendance: 18,051
- Biggest win: 8–2 v Coventry City (28 April 1984)
- Biggest defeat: 0–4 v Queens Park Rangers (24 March 1984)
Home colours	Away colours

The 1983–84 Southampton F.C. season was the club's 83rd season of competitive football and their 14th in the First Division of the Football League. The campaign saw the Saints enjoy their most successful league performance of all-time, finishing second in the top flight behind champions Liverpool, who were winning their third consecutive title. Outside the league, the South Coast side also reached the semi-finals of the FA Cup and the third round of the League Cup.

Despite a disappointing previous season in which the club finished 12th in the First Division, Southampton only made a handful of signings in the summer before the start of the 1983–84 campaign, bringing in centre-back Ken Armstrong to replace the outgoing Chris Nicholl and striker Frank Worthington to bolster their forward line. Later in the season, the club signed striker Alan Curtis and left-back Mark Dennis, while right-back Ivan Golac returned for the last few months of the campaign. Southampton enjoyed numerous unbeaten spells throughout the campaign to ensure they were always in the running for a high finish, including the opening six and final ten games of the season. The latter run included an 8–2 win over Coventry City, which would remain their biggest win in the top flight until the 2014–15 season.

As a First Division side, Southampton entered the 1983–84 FA Cup in the third round. The club made it to the semi-finals of the competition for the first time since winning the trophy in 1976, picking up narrow away victories over Nottingham Forest, Portsmouth and Blackburn Rovers to get there. After thrashing Second Division side Sheffield Wednesday in a sixth round replay after a goalless draw, the Saints faced league rivals Everton in the penultimate round, eventually succumbing to the Toffees thanks to a single goal in extra time. Everton went on to win the cup. In the 1983–84 League Cup, Southampton beat Second Division side Carlisle United 3–2 on aggregate in the second round, before suffering defeat at the hands of Rotherham United of the Third Division to exit the tournament at the second hurdle.

Southampton used 22 players during the 1983–84 season and had 12 different goalscorers. Their top scorer was Steve Moran, who scored 25 goals in all competitions – 21 in the league and four in the FA Cup. Midfielder David Armstrong was the second-highest goalscorer with 19 goals across all three competitions, followed by the previous season's top scorer Danny Wallace on 11 league goals. Armstrong and fellow midfielder Nick Holmes played in all 51 competitive games during the season, with Armstrong picking up the club's Player of the Season award. The average attendance at The Dell during 1983–84 was 18,051. The highest home attendance was 21,141 for the 5–0 league win over Tottenham Hotspur on 7 May 1984 and the lowest was 15,009 for a 0–2 defeat against Notts County on 19 November 1983.

== Background and transfers ==
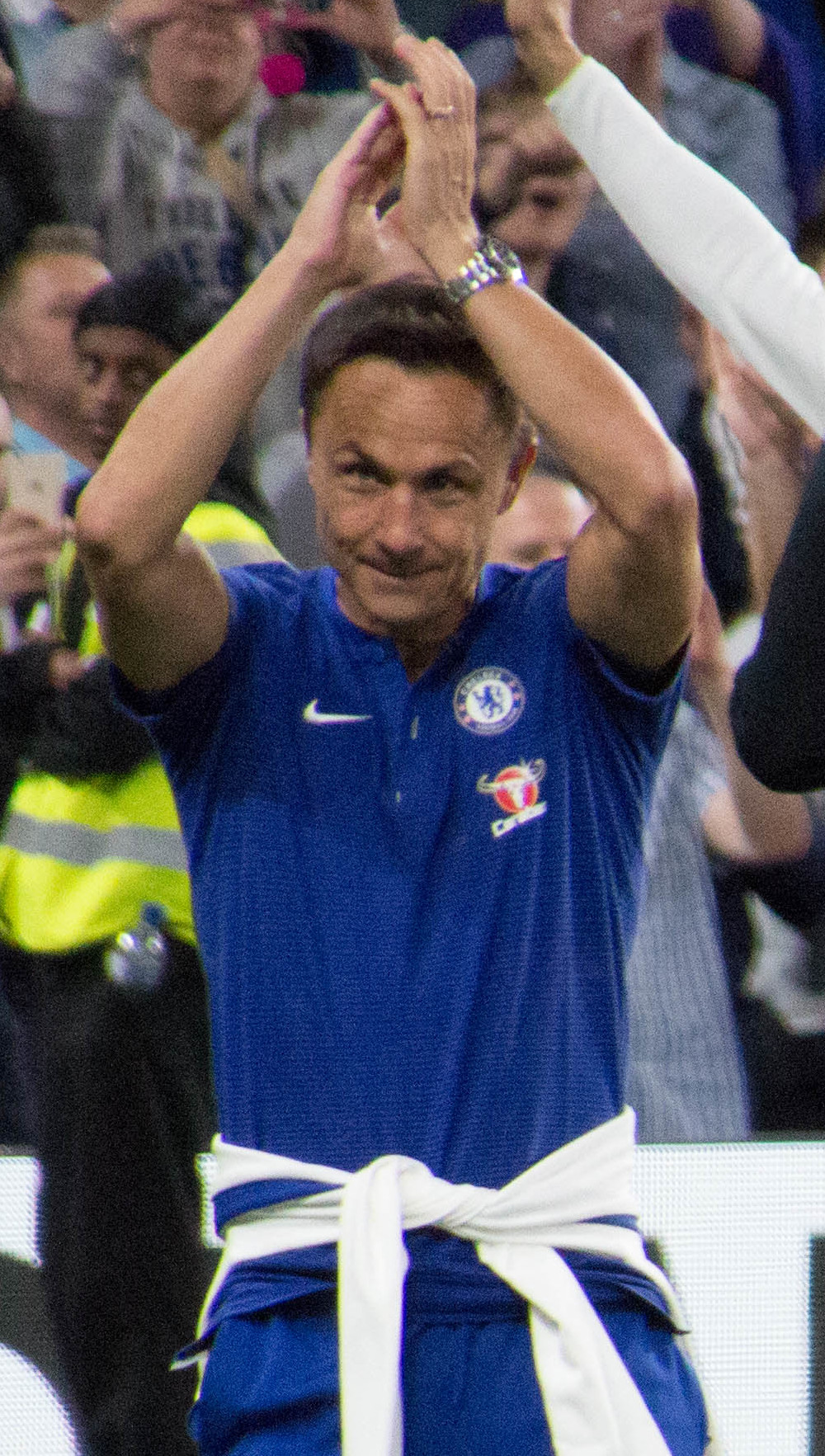
Southampton signed Dennis Wise as an apprentice in the summer of 1983, but he failed to make an appearance for the first team and was later transferred to Wimbledon in 1985.

Ahead of the 1983–84 season, Southampton manager Lawrie McMenemy released seven players from his squad – this included five youth players, striker Bob Lee (who had failed to make an appearance) and goalkeeper Peter Wells, who had been on loan at Millwall since February 1983 and was signed on a permanent basis. Centre-back Chris Nicholl, who had made over 250 appearances for the Saints over a six-season spell, moved to a player-assistant manager role at Grimsby Town. He spent two years with the Mariners, after which he would return to Southampton and take over as first team manager, following Lawrie McMenemy's departure. Following Nicholl's move, the Saints brought in Ken Armstrong from Scottish side Kilmarnock as his replacement; the fee for his signing has been disputed, with sources claiming the club paid either £25,000, £50,000 or £60,000 for his services. Also signed in the summer was striker Frank Worthington from league rivals Sunderland, who joined in June for a reported fee of £25,000.

Shortly after the start of the league season, centre-back Malcolm Waldron made a £100,000 move to Third Division side Burnley, following a frustrating season in which he made only three league appearances after a serious knee injury. In November 1983, after a string of results which included the club's first four defeats, the club made two more signings, bringing in Alan Curtis from Swansea City and Mark Dennis from Birmingham City. At the same time, striker Ian Baird was sent out on a five-month loan to Cardiff City, having struggled to break into the first team ahead of Worthington. The final change in personnel came in March 1984, when Yugoslavian right-back Ivan Golac – who had previously played for the club between 1978 and 1982, before leaving after a "dispute with McMenemy over terms" – returned to Southampton for the final run of games.

Players transferred in

Name	Nationality	Pos.	Club	Date	Fee	Ref.
Ken Armstrong	England	DF	(Scotland) Kilmarnock	June 1983	£50,000 (Note: The fee paid for Ken Armstrong has been disputed, with sources citing either £25,000, £50,000 or £60,000 for his transfer to Southampton.)	
Frank Worthington	England	FW	(England) Sunderland	June 1983	£25,000	
Ian Straw	England	DF	none (free agent)	July 1983	Free	
Dennis Wise	England	MF	none (free agent)	July 1983	Free	
Alan Curtis	Wales	FW	(Wales) Swansea City	November 1983	£80,000	
Mark Dennis	England	DF	(England) Birmingham City	November 1983	Unknown	
Ivan Golac	Yugoslavia	DF	(Socialist Federal Republic of Yugoslavia) Belasica	March 1984	Unknown	

Players transferred out

Name	Nationality	Pos.	Club	Date	Fee	Ref.
Peter Wells	England	GK	(England) Millwall	May 1983	Unknown	
Bob Lee	England	FW	(England) Darlington	August 1983	Free	
David Madden	England	MF	(England) Arsenal	August 1983	Free	
Chris Nicholl	England	DF	(England) Grimsby Town	August 1983	Unknown	
Malcolm Waldron	England	DF	(England) Burnley	September 1983	£100,000	

Players loaned out

Name	Nationality	Pos.	Club	Date from	Date to	Ref.
Ian Baird	England	FW	(Wales) Cardiff City	November 1983	March 1984	
Ken Armstrong	England	DF	(England) Notts County	March 1984	End of season	
Martin Foyle	England	FW	(England) Blackburn Rovers	March 1984	April 1984	
Ian Juryeff	England	FW	(Sweden) Munkfors	March 1984	April 1984	
Ian Juryeff	England	FW	(England) Mansfield Town	April 1984	End of season	

== Pre-season friendlies ==
Ahead of the 1983–84 league campaign, Southampton played seven pre-season friendlies. At the beginning of August, the club completed a short tour of Ireland which included two fixtures – they beat Drogheda United 3–2 and Cobh Ramblers 4–0, with Steve Moran scoring three goals across the two games. Three domestic friendlies followed, with the Saints edging out Third Division side Oxford United at the Manor Ground, before drawing 1–1 with both Bournemouth and Crystal Palace, also away. A week before the start of the league season, the club travelled to Spain to compete in the annual Trofeo Cidade de Vigo, a pre-season friendly tournament. The English side won the trophy after beating Romanian club Dinamo București on penalties and drawing 1–1 with hosts Celta Vigo.

1 August 1983 Friendly	(Republic of Ireland) Drogheda United	2–3	Southampton	Drogheda, Ireland
			Moran; Wallace	Stadium: Weavers Park

3 August 1983 Friendly	(Republic of Ireland) Cobh Ramblers	0–4	Southampton	Cobh, Ireland
			Williams; Moran; Worthington	Stadium: St Colman's Park

8 August 1983 Friendly	Oxford United	4–5	Southampton	Oxford
			Moran; K. Armstrong; Worthington; Wright	Stadium: Manor Ground

10 August 1983 Friendly	Bournemouth	1–1	Southampton	Bournemouth
			Waldron	Stadium: Dean Court

13 August 1983 Friendly	Crystal Palace	1–1	Southampton	London
			Wright	Stadium: Selhurst Park

18 August 1983 Trofeo Cidade de Vigo	(Romania) Dinamo București	0–0 (4–5 p)	Southampton	Vigo, Spain

20 August 1983 Trofeo Cidade de Vigo	(Spain) Celta Vigo	1–1	Southampton	Vigo, Spain
			Moran

== First Division ==
Southampton opened their 1983–84 league campaign in fine form, going unbeaten in their first six fixtures to establish themselves as a contender for the top of the table early on. Victories included an opening day 1–0 win at Nottingham Forest, who had finished the previous season in fifth place; a 1–0 home win over frequent title challengers Arsenal; and a convincing 3–0 win over Manchester United, who had finished the year before at third in the table. The Saints had also managed to hold defending champions Liverpool to a 1–1 draw at Anfield, with a late Mick Mills goal cancelling out Ian Rush's opener. After suffering their first defeat at the hands of Aston Villa after seeing Frank Worthington sent off, the team's good form became more sporadic and they dropped as low as ninth in the league table. During this period, the Saints picked up narrow victories over Wolverhampton Wanderers, Ipswich Town and West Bromwich Albion, but lost points at the hands of struggling sides Luton Town, Norwich City and Notts County. The home loss to Notts County, who would go on to be relegated at the end of the season, is often cited by commentators as a crucial result which set back Southampton's hopes for winning the league.

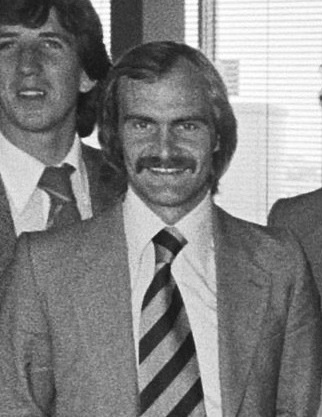
Mick Mills scored both of his 1983–84 league goals in the first half of the season, in a 1–1 draw with Liverpool and a 3–1 win over Stoke City.

Moving into December, Southampton sat ninth in the First Division table. They picked up four wins from five games to move up to third in the table towards the end of the month, including a 3–1 victory over Stoke City, narrow 1–0 wins against West Ham United and Watford, and a 2–1 victory over Birmingham City in which the travelling Blues scored two own goals. The club's form suffered again over the new year, as they picked up just two points from four games in successive 2–2 draws with Arsenal and Aston Villa, which were followed by narrow defeats at the hands of fellow high-flyers Manchester United (2–3) and Nottingham Forest (0–1), leaving Southampton sixth in the table. Another unbeaten run followed, as Southampton picked up 16 of a possible 18 points between 4 February and 16 March, moving back up to fourth place. The final fixture in this run was the first match at The Dell to be broadcast live on television, against league leaders and defending champions Liverpool. The hosts won the game 2–0, with winger Danny Wallace scoring "two sublime strikes" according to club historian Dave Juson. March ended with 0–4 and 0–1 defeats at Queens Park Rangers and Everton, respectively.

Southampton went unbeaten for the last ten games of the 1983–84 season, climbing from fifth place in the table to their final finishing position in second. The first win in the run was a 3–1 victory at home to Everton, who had knocked the Saints out of the FA Cup semi-finals just three days previously. The third win of the run was an 8–2 thrashing of visiting Coventry City, who were fighting against the risk of relegation. Among the home side's eight goals were hat-tricks for two players – Steve Moran and Danny Wallace – which marked the first time this had happened for the club since 1964. The result set a new club record for biggest winning margin in the top flight, which remained in place until they beat Sunderland 8–0 in the Premier League in 2014. The Saints also beat Tottenham Hotspur – who finished fourth the previous year – 5–0, although the visitors were later fined £7,500 by UEFA for purposely "fielding a weakened side" ahead of the first leg of their UEFA Cup final two days later.

In their last two fixtures, Southampton picked up away victories over West Bromwich Albion (2–0) and Notts County (3–1) to leapfrog Nottingham Forest, Queens Park Rangers and Manchester United into the runners-up position in the table. The club finished the First Division campaign on 77 points, three ahead of Forest and United, with 22 wins, 11 draws and nine defeats; their tally of just 38 goals conceded was the first time the club had let in less than a goal per game in the top flight. The club's points total of 77 was the highest they had achieved in the Football League to date, and would remain the club record until their promotion-winning 2010–11 season (which featured 46 matches – four more than in 1983–84). Due to their final league position, Southampton qualified for the 1984–85 UEFA Cup.

=== List of match results ===
27 August 1983 1	Nottingham Forest	0–1	Southampton	Nottingham
			Wallace 66'	Stadium: City Ground; Attendance: 14,626

29 August 1983 2	Southampton	0–0	Queens Park Rangers	Southampton
				Stadium: The Dell; Attendance: 19,522

3 September 1983 3	Southampton	1–0	Arsenal	Southampton
	Baird 72'			Stadium: The Dell; Attendance: 19,377

6 September 1983 4	Liverpool	1–1	Southampton	Liverpool
	Rush 62'		Mills 84'	Stadium: Anfield; Attendance: 26,331

10 September 1983 5	Sunderland	0–2	Southampton	Sunderland
			Moran 22', 67'	Stadium: Roker Park; Attendance: 12,716

17 September 1983 6	Southampton	3–0	Manchester United	Southampton
	Wallace 3'; Williams 16'; D. Armstrong 79'			Stadium: The Dell; Attendance: 20,674

24 September 1983 7	Aston Villa	1–0	Southampton	Birmingham
	Withe 24'			Stadium: Villa Park; Attendance: 21,209

1 October 1983 8	Southampton	1–0	Wolverhampton Wanderers	Southampton
	Worthington 82'			Stadium: The Dell; Attendance: 16,589

22 October 1983 9	Luton Town	3–1	Southampton	Luton
	Aylott 14', 32'; Stein 65'		D. Armstrong 68'	Stadium: Kenilworth Road; Attendance: 12,389

29 October 1983 10	Southampton	3–2	Ipswich Town	Southampton
	Williams 4'; Holmes 59'; Moran 90'		Mariner 19', 27'	Stadium: The Dell; Attendance: 18,515

5 November 1983 11	Norwich City	1–0	Southampton	Norwich
	Bertschin 61'			Stadium: Carrow Road; Attendance: 14,303

12 November 1983 12	Southampton	1–0	West Bromwich Albion	Southampton
	Moran 19' (pen.)			Stadium: The Dell; Attendance: 16,450

19 November 1983 13	Southampton	0–2	Notts County	Southampton
			Fashanu 19'; Christie 88'	Stadium: The Dell; Attendance: 15,009

26 November 1983 14	Coventry City	0–0	Southampton	Coventry
				Stadium: Highfield Road; Attendance: 11,579

30 November 1983 15	Leicester City	2–1	Southampton	Leicester
	Smith 22'; Lineker 74'		Worthington 83'	Stadium: Filbert Street; Attendance: 14,181

3 December 1983 16	Southampton	3–1	Stoke City	Southampton
	Wallace 35'; D. Armstrong 44'; Mills 60'		James 14'	Stadium: The Dell; Attendance: 15,301

10 December 1983 17	Tottenham Hotspur	0–0	Southampton	London
				Stadium: White Hart Lane; Attendance: 29,711

17 December 1983 18	Southampton	2–1	Birmingham City	Southampton
	Blake 6' (o.g.); Hagan 79' (o.g.)		Stevenson 44'	Stadium: The Dell; Attendance: 15,248

26 December 1983 19	West Ham United	0–1	Southampton	London
			Wallace 64'	Stadium: Boleyn Ground; Attendance: 22,221

27 December 1983 20	Southampton	1–0	Watford	Southampton
	D. Armstrong 21'			Stadium: The Dell; Attendance: 20,759

31 December 1983 21	Arsenal	2–2	Southampton	London
	Cork 16'; Nicholas 49' (pen.)		Moran 62', 75'	Stadium: Arsenal Stadium; Attendance: 27,596

2 January 1984 22	Southampton	2–2	Aston Villa	Southampton
	Moran 81'; D. Armstrong 85'		McMahon 3'; Shaw 48'	Stadium: The Dell; Attendance: 18,963

21 January 1984 23	Manchester United	3–2	Southampton	Manchester
	Robson 19'; Stapleton 31'; Mühren 60'		Moran 3', 38'	Stadium: Old Trafford; Attendance: 40,371

23 January 1984 24	Southampton	0–1	Nottingham Forest	Southampton
			Birtles 31'	Stadium: The Dell; Attendance: 17,420

4 February 1984 25	Wolverhampton Wanderers	0–1	Southampton	Wolverhampton
			Moran 63'	Stadium: Molineux Stadium; Attendance: 9,943

11 February 1984 26	Southampton	1–1	Sunderland	Southampton
	Chapman 81'		Moran 63' (pen.)	Stadium: The Dell; Attendance: 16,968

21 February 1984 27	Ipswich Town	0–3	Southampton	Ipswich
			Worthington 10'; Moran 33'; D. Armstrong 38'	Stadium: Portman Road; Attendance: 14,934

25 February 1984 28	Southampton	2–1	Luton Town	Southampton
	Wright 32'; D. Armstrong 44'		Donaghy 89'	Stadium: The Dell; Attendance: 17,947

3 March 1984 29	Southampton	2–1	Norwich City	Southampton
	D. Armstrong 12'; Puckett 82'		Deehan 60'	Stadium: The Dell; Attendance: 17,456

16 March 1984 30	Southampton	2–0	Liverpool	Southampton
	Wallace 45', 85'			Stadium: The Dell; Attendance: 19,698

24 March 1984 31	Queens Park Rangers	4–0	Southampton	London
	Wicks 16'; Micklewhite 43'; Allen 60'; Waddock 64'			Stadium: Loftus Road; Attendance: 15,407

31 March 1984 32	Everton	1–0	Southampton	Liverpool
	Gray 40'			Stadium: Goodison Park; Attendance: 20,244

7 April 1984 33	Southampton	2–2	Leicester City	Southampton
	Wallace 51'; Moran 87'		Lineker 48', 73'	Stadium: The Dell; Attendance: 17,455

17 April 1984 34	Southampton	3–1	Everton	Southampton
	D. Armstrong 46', 79'; Moran 80'			Stadium: The Dell; Attendance: 16,978

21 April 1984 35	Southampton	2–0	West Ham United	Southampton
	Holmes 33'; Moran 76'			Stadium: The Dell; Attendance: 20,846

24 April 1984 36	Watford	1–1	Southampton	Watford
	Reilly 16'		D. Armstrong 68'	Stadium: Vicarage Road; Attendance: 16,744

28 April 1984 37	Southampton	8–2	Coventry City	Southampton
	D. Armstrong 28'; Wallace 36', 64', 85'; Moran 57', 76', 82'; Worthington 69'		Grimes 66'; Gynn 88'	Stadium: The Dell; Attendance: 16,746

5 May 1984 38	Stoke City	1–1	Southampton	Stoke-on-Trent
	Maguire 80'		Holmes 69'	Stadium: Victoria Ground; Attendance: 12,131

7 May 1984 39	Southampton	5–0	Tottenham Hotspur	Southampton
	Puckett 27'; Wallace 39', 67'; D. Armstrong 73', 79'			Stadium: The Dell; Attendance: 21,141

12 May 1984 40	Birmingham City	0–0	Southampton	Birmingham
				Stadium: St Andrew's; Attendance: 16,445

14 May 1984 41	West Bromwich Albion	0–2	Southampton	West Bromwich
			Puckett 71'; Moran 72'	Stadium: The Hawthorns; Attendance: 10,365

17 May 1984 42	Notts County	1–3	Southampton	Nottingham
	Christie 9'		Moran 2', 56'; D. Armstrong 67'	Stadium: Meadow Lane; Attendance: 6,035

=== Final league table ===
Pos	Team	Pld	W	D	L	GF	GA	GD	Pts	Qualification or relegation
1	Liverpool (C)	42	22	14	6	73	32	+41	80	Qualification for the European Cup first round
2	Southampton	42	22	11	9	66	38	+28	77	Qualification for the UEFA Cup first round
3	Nottingham Forest	42	22	8	12	76	45	+31	74	Qualification for the UEFA Cup first round
4	Manchester United	42	20	14	8	71	41	+30	74	Qualification for the UEFA Cup first round
5	Queens Park Rangers	42	22	7	13	67	37	+30	73	Qualification for the UEFA Cup first round

Source: RSSSF
Rules for classification: 1) Points; 2) Goal difference; 3) Goals scored
(C) Champions

=== Results by matchday ===
Round	1	2	3	4	5	6	7	8	9	10	11	12	13	14	15	16	17	18	19	20	21	22	23	24	25	26	27	28	29	30	31	32	33	34	35	36	37	38	39	40	41	42
Ground	A	H	H	A	A	H	A	H	A	H	A	H	H	A	A	H	A	H	A	H	A	H	A	H	A	H	A	H	H	H	A	A	H	H	H	A	H	A	H	A	A	A
Result	W	D	W	D	W	W	L	W	L	W	L	W	L	D	L	W	D	W	W	W	D	D	L	L	W	D	W	W	W	W	L	L	D	W	W	D	W	D	W	D	W	W
Position	9	5	4	6	5	2	3	2	7	5	8	4	9	8	8	6	9	6	4	3	4	5	6	6	6	6	6	5	5	4	4	5	5	5	5	5	4	4	4	5	3	2

Source: 11v11.com
A = Away; H = Home; W = Win; D = Draw; L = Loss

== FA Cup ==
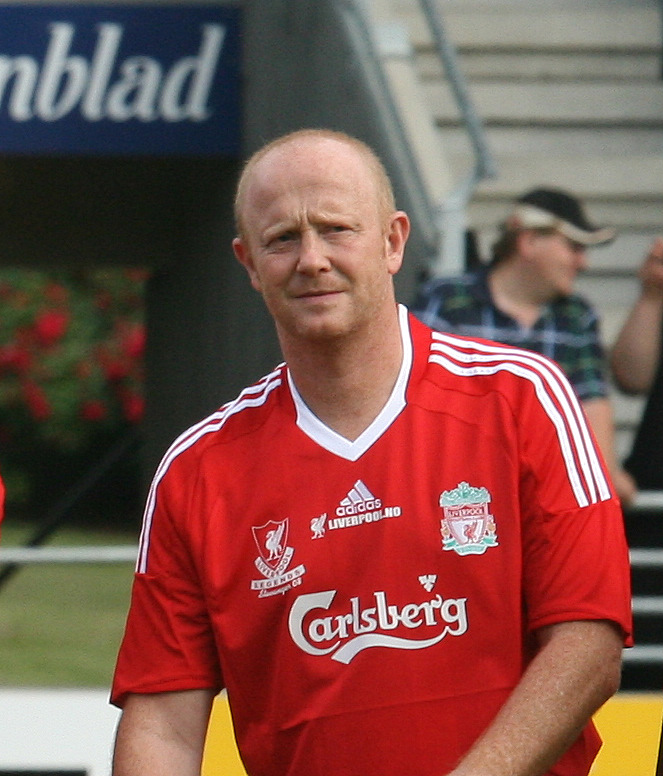
Mark Wright scored one of two goals in the 1983–84 season against Sheffield Wednesday in the FA Cup sixth round replay.

Southampton entered the 1983–84 FA Cup in the third round, facing fellow First Division side Nottingham Forest. The Saints won the fixture at the City Ground 2–1, with Steve Moran scoring both goals in the last 15 minutes of the match, either side of a single goal from the hosts. In the fourth round, the team travelled to local rivals Portsmouth, who had recently been promoted back to the Second Division as champions of the Third Division, for the first FA Cup meeting between the clubs since 1906. In a "frantic" fixture, the hosts looked closest to opening the scoring in the first half, with Southampton's Moran unable to challenge the Pompey back line. Around 15 minutes after the break, Saints defender Mark Dennis was struck by an object thrown by one of the home fans; play was delayed for a few minutes, but Dennis continued. It was during time added on for this incident that Southampton scored the only goal of the game, with Moran converting a half-volley from a David Armstrong cross to send them into the fifth round for the first time since 1981.

In the fifth round, Southampton travelled to another Second Division side, Blackburn Rovers, who were unbeaten in 16 games and had only lost once at home in the season to date. The hosts almost went ahead in the first half through Simon Garner, but centre-back Reuben Agboola made a "miraculous clearance" off the goal line to keep the Saints in the game. Shortly after the hour mark, David Armstrong scored the only goal of the game to send Southampton through to the sixth round of the competition. In their first FA Cup quarter-final since 1979, Southampton were again drawn away to a Second Division side, this time eventual promotees Sheffield Wednesday. Despite periods of domination and plenty of opportunities for both sides, the game ended in a goalless draw and went to a replay. In the rematch at The Dell, the Saints came back from an early deficit to lead 2–1 at half-time, with Steve Williams scoring a free-kick and Mick Mills causing Gavin Oliver to score an own goal, both just before the break. Despite the difficult first 45 minutes, the hosts quickly added to their tally, with Mark Wright making it 3–1 in the 52nd minute, David Armstrong adding a fourth after 80 minutes, and Moran finishing off the scoring two minutes later.

Southampton faced league rivals Everton in their first FA Cup semi-final since 1976, to whom they had lost 0–1 just two weeks earlier. The first half at Arsenal Stadium was relatively equal, with both sides coming close to breaking the deadlock – Everton through Andy Gray early on and Peter Reid shortly before the break; Southampton through Moran multiple times during the period. The second half was largely dominated by the Toffees, with Adrian Heath and Trevor Steven both coming close on multiple occasions, testing Peter Shilton and the Saints defence. The fixture went to extra time, with Everton continuing to enjoy the majority of chances on goal; just three minutes from the end, Heath finally scored the only goal of the game, heading in from a free-kick to take the Merseyside team through to their eighth FA Cup final. Blame for the loss was directed by some, including players Frank Worthington and Ivan Golac, at manager Lawrie McMenemy, who had chosen to include Steve Williams in the starting lineup despite a recent injury – Worthington later described this as "the most costly piece of mismanagement it has ever been my misfortune to witness".

7 January 1984 Round 3	Nottingham Forest	1–2	Southampton	Nottingham
	Hart 83'		Moran 77', 86'	Stadium: City Ground; Attendance: 19,271

28 January 1984 Round 4	Portsmouth	0–1	Southampton	Portsmouth
			Moran 90'	Stadium: Fratton Park; Attendance: 36,000

17 February 1984 Round 5	Blackburn Rovers	0–1	Southampton	Blackburn
			D. Armstrong 63'	Stadium: Ewood Park; Attendance: 15,357

11 March 1984 Round 6	Sheffield Wednesday	0–0	Southampton	Sheffield
				Stadium: Hillsborough Stadium; Attendance: 40,030

20 March 1984 Round 6 Replay	Southampton	5–1	Sheffield Wednesday	Southampton
	Williams 42'; Oliver 45' (o.g.); Wright 52'; D. Armstrong 80'; Moran 82'		Lyons 21'	Stadium: The Dell; Attendance: 20,590

14 April 1984 Semi-Final	Everton	1–0 (a.e.t.)	Southampton	London
	Heath 117'			Stadium: Arsenal Stadium; Attendance: 46,587

== League Cup ==
Southampton entered the 1983–84 League Cup in the second round against Second Division side Carlisle United. After losing the first leg 0–2 at Brunton Park, the top-flight Saints won the second leg 3–2 after extra time to advance to the third round, with David Armstrong's fourth-minute opener followed by two goals from substitute Martin Foyle. In the third round, the South Coast side faced Rotherham United of the Third Division; despite "dominating the play", they struggled to create chances and suffered a 2–1 defeat with all three goals scored in the first half.

4 October 1983 Round 2 Leg 1	Carlisle United	2–0	Southampton	Carlisle
	Poskett 16', 85'			Stadium: Brunton Park; Attendance: 8,570

25 October 1983 Round 2 Leg 2	Southampton	3–0 (a.e.t.) (3–2 agg.)	Carlisle United	Southampton
	D. Armstrong 4'; Foyle 86', 114'			Stadium: The Dell; Attendance: 12,483

8 November 1983 Round 3	Rotherham United	2–1	Southampton	Rotherham
	Rhodes 11'; Mitchell 36'		D. Armstrong 24'	Stadium: Millmoor; Attendance: 8,821

== Other matches ==
During the 1983–84 season, the Southampton first team played an additional two friendlies. Both games took place in October and saw the Saints hosted by a side representing Kuwait and Jordan-based club Al-Ramtha, which ended in a 1–2 loss and goalless draw, respectively.

8 October 1983 Friendly	Kuwait XI	2–1	Southampton	Bahrain
			Holmes

10 October 1983 Friendly	(Jordan) Al-Ramtha	0–0	Southampton	Ar-Ramtha, Jordan
				Stadium: Prince Hashim Stadium

== Player details ==
Southampton used 22 different players during the 1983–84 season, 12 of whom scored during the campaign. Midfielders David Armstrong and Nick Holmes played in all 51 games – 42 in the league, six in the FA Cup and three in the League Cup; goalkeeper Peter Shilton and winger Danny Wallace missed just one game each – Shilton in the League Cup, Wallace in the First Division. Steve Moran finished as the season's top goalscorer with 21 goals in the league and four in the FA Cup, followed by Armstrong on 19 goals (15 in the league and two in each cup) and Wallace on 11 goals (all in the league).

=== Squad statistics ===
Name	Pos.	Nat.	League		FA Cup		League Cup		Total	
Name	Pos.	Nat.	Apps.	Gls.	Apps.	Gls.	Apps.	Gls.	Apps.	Gls.
Reuben Agboola	DF	(Nigeria)	33	0	6	0	3	0	42	0
David Armstrong	MF	(England)	42	15	6	2	3	2	51	19
Ian Baird	FW	(England)	6	1	0	0	1	0	7	1
Steve Baker	DF	(England)	8	0	0	0	2	0	10	0
Alan Curtis	FW	(Wales)	8(1)	0	0	0	0	0	8(1)	1
Mark Dennis	DF	(England)	20	0	6	0	0	0	26	0
Martin Foyle	FW	(England)	2(3)	0	0	0	0(2)	2	2(5)	2
Ivan Golac	DF	(Socialist Federal Republic of Yugoslavia)	11	0	0	0	0	0	11	0
Nick Holmes	MF	(England)	42	3	6	0	3	0	51	3
Mick Mills	DF	(England)	34	2	6	0	1	0	41	2
Steve Moran	FW	(England)	33(1)	21	6	4	3	0	42(1)	25
David Puckett	FW	(England)	7(11)	3	0	0	0	0	7(11)	3
Dennis Rofe	DF	(England)	2(1)	0	0	0	1	0	3(1)	0
Peter Shilton	GK	(England)	42	0	6	0	3	0	51	0
Alistair Sperring	GK	(England)	0	0	0	0	1	0	1	0
Danny Wallace	MF	(England)	41	11	6	0	3	0	50	11
Mark Whitlock	DF	(England)	13(1)	0	0	0	1	0	14(1)	0
Steve Williams	MF	(England)	27	3	6	1	2	0	35	4
Frank Worthington	FW	(England)	34	4	6	0	2	0	42	4
Mark Wright	DF	(England)	31	1	6	1	3	0	40	2
Players with appearances who ended the season out on loan
Ken Armstrong	DF	(England)	26	0	0	0	2	0	28	0
Ian Juryeff	FW	(England)	0(2)	0	0	0	0	0	0(2)	0

=== Most appearances ===
Rank	Name	Pos.	League		FA Cup		League Cup		Total		
Rank	Name	Pos.	Starts	Subs	Starts	Subs	Starts	Subs	Starts	Subs	Total
1	David Armstrong	MF	42	0	6	0	3	0	51	0	51
1	Nick Holmes	MF	42	0	6	0	3	0	51	0	51
3	Peter Shilton	GK	42	0	6	0	2	0	50	0	50
3	Danny Wallace	MF	41	0	6	0	3	0	50	0	50
5	Steve Moran	FW	33	1	6	0	3	0	42	1	43
6	Reuben Agboola	DF	33	0	6	0	3	0	42	0	42
6	Frank Worthington	FW	34	0	6	0	2	0	42	0	42
8	Mick Mills	DF	34	0	6	0	1	0	41	0	41
9	Mark Wright	DF	31	0	6	0	3	0	40	0	40
10	Steve Williams	MF	27	0	6	0	2	0	35	0	35

=== Top goalscorers ===
Rank	Name	Pos.	League		FA Cup		League Cup		Total		
Rank	Name	Pos.	Goals	Apps	Goals	Apps	Goals	Apps	Goals	Apps	GPG
1	Steve Moran	FW	21	34	4	6	0	3	25	43	0.58
2	David Armstrong	MF	15	42	2	6	2	3	19	51	0.37
3	Danny Wallace	MF	11	41	0	6	0	3	11	50	0.22
4	Steve Williams	MF	3	27	1	6	0	2	4	35	0.11
4	Frank Worthington	FW	4	34	0	6	0	2	4	42	0.10
6	David Puckett	FW	3	18	0	0	0	0	3	18	0.17
6	Nick Holmes	MF	3	42	0	6	0	3	3	51	0.06
8	Martin Foyle	FW	0	5	0	0	2	2	2	7	0.29
8	Mark Wright	DF	1	31	1	6	0	3	2	40	0.05
8	Mick Mills	DF	2	34	0	6	0	1	2	41	0.04

== Bibliography ==
- Chalk, Gary; Holley, Duncan (10 August 1987), A Complete Record of Southampton Football Club: 1885–1987, Derby, England: Breedon Books, ISBN 978-0907969228
- Chalk, Gary; Holley, Duncan; Bull, David (28 November 2013), All the Saints: A Complete Who's Who of Southampton FC, Bristol, England: Hagiology Publishing, ISBN 978-0992686406
- Holley, Duncan; Chalk, Gary (2003), Bull, David (ed.), In That Number: A Post-War Chronicle of Southampton FC, Bristol, England: Hagiology Publishing, ISBN 0-9534474-3-X
- Juson, Dave; Aldworth, Clay; Bendel, Barry; Bull, David; Chalk, Gary (10 November 2004), Saints v Pompey: A History of Unrelenting Rivalry, Bristol, England: Hagiology Publishing, ISBN 978-0953447459
