= 1984–85 Southampton F.C. season =

Southampton F.C.
1984–85 season
- Chairman: Alan Woodford
- Manager: Lawrie McMenemy
- Stadium: The Dell
- First Division: 5th
- FA Cup: Fifth round
- League Cup: Fourth round
- UEFA Cup: First round
- Top goalscorer: League: Joe Jordan (12); All: Steve Moran (18)
- Highest home attendance: 23,001 v Liverpool (14 May 1985)
- Lowest home attendance: 11,824 v Hull City (26 September 1984)
- Average home league attendance: 18,038
- Biggest win: 4–0 v Sunderland (5 January 1985); 4–0 v Queens Park Rangers (2 February 1985)
- Biggest defeat: 0–4 v Queens Park Rangers (5 December 1984); 1–5 v Tottenham Hotspur (23 March 1985)
Home colours	Away colours

The 1984–85 Southampton F.C. season was the club's 84th season of competitive football and their 15th in the First Division of the Football League. Following their highest league finish the previous season, 1984–85 saw the Saints continue to perform at the top level, finishing fifth in the league – their second-highest top flight result to date. Outside the league, the South Coast side reached the fifth round of the FA Cup, the fourth round of the League Cup, and the first round of the UEFA Cup.

After their most successful league season to date in 1983–84, Southampton had a relatively quiet summer transfer window. When Frank Worthington left after one season to join Brighton & Hove Albion, the club signed Scottish striker Joe Jordan from Italian side Hellas Verona as his replacement. Other new signings included Kevin Bond, Phil Kite and Mark Blake. Later in the season, the club brought in Andy Townsend, George Lawrence and Jimmy Case, while Steve Williams, Reuben Agboola and Ian Juryeff departed. The Saints started their league campaign poorly, dropping to the bottom of the table by picking up just one point from their first four games, before embarking on a 14-game unbeaten run to break into the top five. The team continued to pick up important results throughout the second half of the season to secure this position.

As a First Division side, Southampton entered the 1984–85 FA Cup in the third round. The club beat First Division strugglers Sunderland and Third Division side Orient, before facing elimination at the hands of Barnsley of the Second Division in the fifth round. In the League Cup, the Saints edged past Third Division side Hull City and Second Division strugglers Wolverhampton Wanderers in the second and third rounds, respectively, before they were knocked out by league rivals Queens Park Rangers in the fourth round, losing a second replay 0–4 at Loftus Road. After finishing second in the league in 1984, the club entered the 1984–85 UEFA Cup in the first round for the third time in four years. They played Hamburger SV, who had qualified as runners-up of the Bundesliga, holding them to a 0–0 draw at home before losing the away leg 0–2.

Southampton used 23 players during the 1984–85 season and had 13 different goalscorers. Their top scorer was again Steve Moran, who scored 18 goals in all competitions – 11 in the league, four in the FA Cup and three in the League Cup. New signing Joe Jordan was the club's top scorer in the First Division, with 12 league goals (he also scored twice in both the FA Cup and the League Cup). David Armstrong and Danny Wallace finished third, with ten goals each. Full-back Mick Mills played in every game during the campaign, with goalkeeper Peter Shilton missing just one game in the league. The average attendance at The Dell during 1984–85 was 18,038. The highest home attendance was 23,001 for the final game of the season, a 1–1 draw with Liverpool, and the lowest was 14,006 for a 1–0 win over Luton Town on 2 April 1985.

== Background and transfers ==
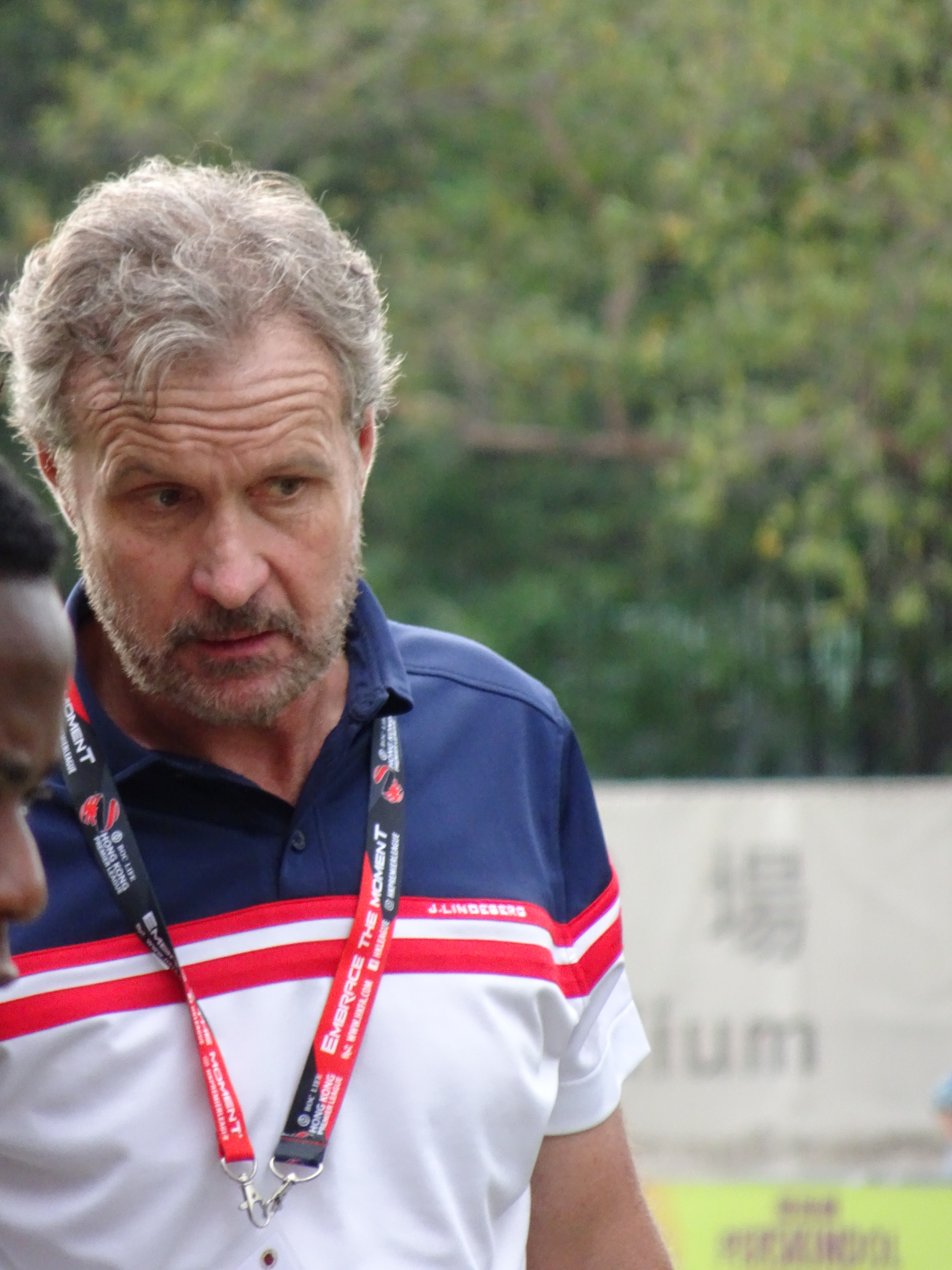
Centre-back Kevin Bond joined Southampton after the departure of Ken Armstrong in the summer.

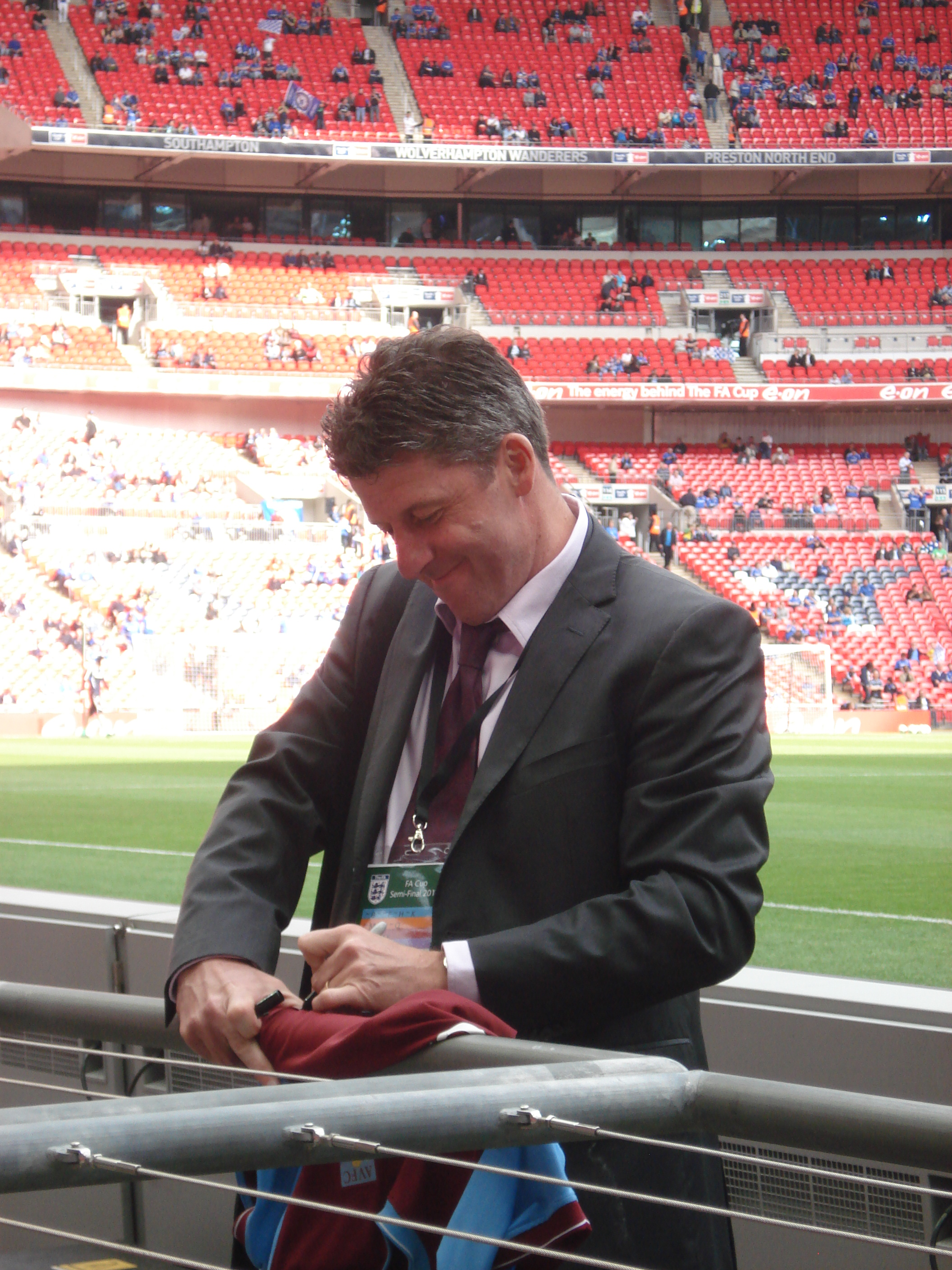
Andy Townsend joined Southampton in the second half of the season, marking his first time in the Football League.

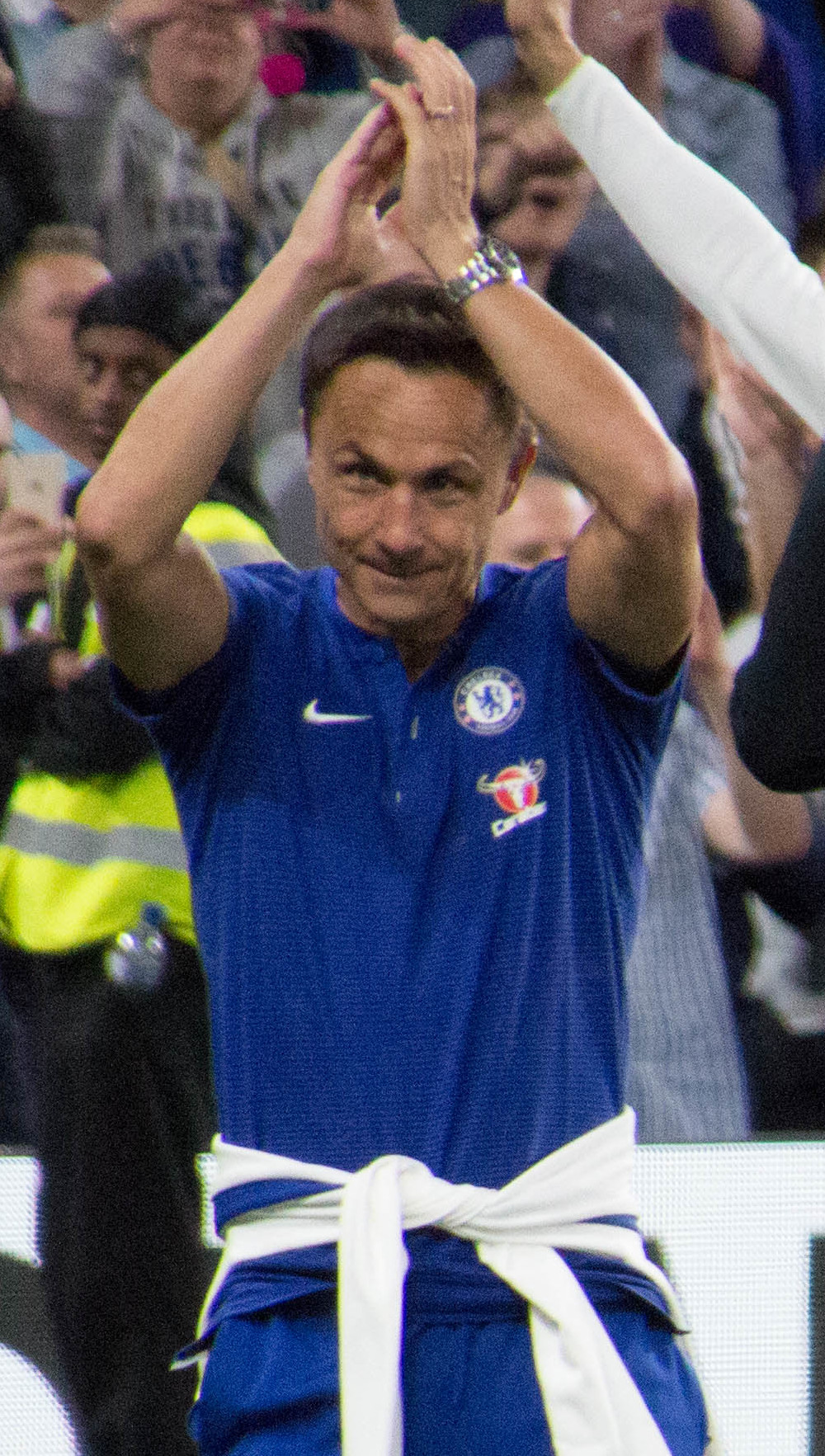
Dennis Wise signed for Wimbledon in March 1985, having failed to make an appearance for the first team.

Ahead of the 1984–85 season, a number of players left Southampton. First, striker Frank Worthington departed after one successful season, following an incident which led to him falling out with manager Lawrie McMenemy; he moved to Brighton & Hove Albion in the Second Division. In August, centre-back Ken Armstrong also left after just one year with the club, sold to recently relegated Birmingham City; and out-of-favour forward Martin Foyle moved to local Fourth Division side Aldershot for a fee of £10,000. Worthington was replaced by Joe Jordan, who signed for £150,000 from Serie A side Hellas Verona in August. Armstrong was not immediately replaced, but after the first few games of the season – which saw the Saints drop immediately to the bottom of the table with three defeats – Kevin Bond was brought in from Manchester City in September.

Transfer activity continued throughout the season. In December, first-choice midfielder Steve Williams moved to Arsenal for £550,000 – a new club record for Southampton. The next month, the Saints signed two new midfielders, bringing back George Lawrence from Oxford United, to whom he had been sold just over two years earlier, and signing youngster Andy Townsend for his first taste of the Football League, joining from Weymouth in the Alliance Premier League. Also in January, experienced defender Reuben Agboola was sold to Sunderland for £150,000, following a disciplinary incident earlier in the season. The new year also saw Ian Juryeff and Ian Baird leave Southampton for lower league sides – Juryeff moved to Orient in the Third Division, while Baird signed for Leeds United in the Second. Ivan Golac was briefly loaned out to Portsmouth.

Shortly before the end of the 1984–85 season, Southampton signed two more players – 30-year-old Jimmy Case joined from Brighton & Hove Albion for a fee of £35,000 and former player John Sharpe rejoined on a temporary, non-contract basis. Meanwhile Dennis Wise, who had signed as an apprentice ahead of the 1983–84 season, made his first professional move to Second Division side Wimbledon. According to club historians, Wise had previously been fined by McMenemy for his involvement in a "nightclub incident" with Agboola; he then, according to his own autobiography, "overplayed his hand, upon his return to the fold, in attempting to bid-up his apprentice's wages", which led to his departure shortly thereafter. Wise would later re-sign for the club in August 2005, playing a handful of games in the first half of the 2005–06 season.

Players transferred in

Name	Nationality	Pos.	Club	Date	Fee	Ref.
Paul Baker	England	FW	(England) Bishop Auckland	June 1984	Free	
Mark Blake	England	DF	none (free agent)	July 1984	Free (Note: Mark Blake signed as an apprentice in July 1984, before turning professional in December 1985.)	
Robbie Carroll	England	MF	none (free agent)	July 1984	Free (Note: Robbie Carroll signed as an apprentice in July 1984, before turning professional in February 1986.)	
Joe Jordan	Scotland	FW	(Italy) Hellas Verona	August 1984	£150,000	
Phil Kite	England	GK	(England) Bristol Rovers	August 1984	Free	
Kevin Bond	England	DF	(England) Manchester City	September 1984	£60,000	
Chris Townsend	Wales	FW	(Wales) Cardiff City	December 1984	Free	
George Lawrence	England	MF	(England) Oxford United	January 1985	£60,000	
Andy Townsend	Republic of Ireland	MF	(England) Weymouth	January 1985	£35,000	
Jimmy Case	England	MF	(England) Brighton & Hove Albion	March 1985	£35,000	
John Sharpe	England	DF	(England) Gillingham	March 1985	Free	

Players transferred out

Name	Nationality	Pos.	Club	Date	Fee	Ref.
Frank Worthington	England	FW	(England) Brighton & Hove Albion	May 1984	Unknown	
Alan Knill	Wales	DF	(England) Halifax Town	July 1984	Free	
Ken Armstrong	England	DF	(England) Birmingham City	August 1984	£100,000	
Martin Foyle	England	FW	(England) Aldershot	August 1984	£10,000	
Barry Blankley	England	DF	(England) Aldershot	December 1984	Free	
Steve Williams	England	MF	(England) Arsenal	December 1984	£550,000	
Reuben Agboola	Nigeria	DF	(England) Sunderland	January 1985	£150,000	
Ian Juryeff	England	FW	(England) Orient	February 1985	Unknown	
Ian Baird	England	FW	(England) Leeds United	March 1985	£75,000	
Dennis Wise	England	DF	(England) Wimbledon	March 1985	Free	

Players loaned out

Name	Nationality	Pos.	Club	Date from	Date to	Ref.
Alistair Sperring	England	GK	(England) Swindon Town	August 1984	September 1984	
Ian Juryeff	England	FW	(England) Reading	November 1984	January 1985	
Ian Baird	England	FW	(England) Newcastle United	December 1984	January 1985	
Ivan Golac	Yugoslavia	DF	(England) Portsmouth	January 1985	March 1985	

Players retired

Name	Nationality	Pos.	Date	Reason	Ref.
Dennis Rofe	England	DF	September 1984	Retired due to age; took over as Southampton Reserves manager	

== Pre-season friendlies ==
Ahead of the 1984–85 league campaign, Southampton played eight pre-season friendlies. Like in the previous season, the club started their pre-season preparations with a short tour of Ireland, during which they beat Galway United 2–0, Finn Harps 1-0 and Waterford United 5–0. Another repeat from the season before saw Oxford United host the Saints, which ended in a 3–0 victory for the top flight side, which was followed by a 1–2 defeat at Orient and a 1–0 win over Reading. A short Spanish tour saw Southampton lose 1–2 at Athletic Bilbao and draw 2–2 at Osasuna.

29 July 1984 Friendly	(Republic of Ireland) Galway United	0–2	Southampton	Galway, Ireland
			D. Armstrong; Moran	Stadium: Eamonn Deacy Park

1 August 1984 Friendly	(Republic of Ireland) Finn Harps	0–1	Southampton	Ballybofey, Ireland
			Moran	Stadium: Finn Park

2 August 1984 Friendly	(Republic of Ireland) Waterford United	0–5	Southampton	Waterford, Ireland
			D. Armstrong; Dennis; Puckett	Stadium: Kilcohan Park

6 August 1984 Friendly	Oxford United	0–3	Southampton	Oxford
			D. Armstrong; K. Armstrong; Curtis	Stadium: Manor Ground

9 August 1984 Friendly	Orient	2–1	Southampton	London
			Baird	Stadium: Brisbane Road

13 August 1984 Friendly	Reading	0–1	Southampton	Reading
			K. Armstrong	Stadium: Elm Park

16 August 1984 Friendly	(Spain) Athletic Bilbao	2–1	Southampton	Bilbao, Spain
			Moran	Stadium: San Mamés Stadium

18 August 1984 Friendly	(Spain) Osasuna	2–2	Southampton	Pamplona, Spain
			D. Armstrong; Wright	Stadium: El Sadar Stadium

== First Division ==
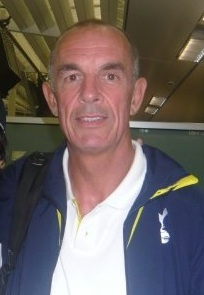
Joe Jordan replaced Frank Worthington in the summer and would finish the 1984–85 season as Southampton's top goalscorer in the league.

Despite finishing the previous season in a club-record second place in the First Division, Southampton started the 1984–85 league campaign in terrible form. They picked up just one point from their first four games, in a goalless draw at home to Manchester United, while facing defeat at the hands of Sunderland, West Ham United and promotees Sheffield Wednesday. After these fixtures, Southampton were bottom of the First Division table. The club's form began to improve, however, as they embarked on an unbeaten run which would stretch for the next three months. The spell began with a 1–1 draw at Luton Town, followed by the club's first league win of the season over Norwich City.

After they signed Kevin Bond at the end of September, the team's defensive record improved and they picked up a number of key wins to start moving up the league table. In early October, they beat league leaders Tottenham Hotspur by a single Steve Moran goal; a few weeks later, they beat First Division newcomers Chelsea in the same circumstances; in early November, they won 1–0 against Nottingham Forest, who had finished just behind them the previous year; and the following week, they scored a late equaliser against defending champions Liverpool at Anfield. By the time their unbeaten run was ended by Coventry City in mid-December, the Saints had made it up to fifth place in the First Division table. In the final few games of the run, regular starters Mark Wright and Steve Williams had been dropped following a "dressing room brawl" at half-time during a League Cup tie.

Over the Christmas period, Southampton dropped to ninth in the table after a string of poor results, including two home defeats against Watford and Sheffield Wednesday. The new year saw the side regain a few positions, with narrow wins in January over Leicester City and Sunderland bookending a disappointing loss on the road at Norwich City. The Saints picked up their biggest win of the campaign the next month, as they beat Queens Park Rangers (who would end the season avoiding relegation by just one point) 4–0 with goals from Joe Jordan, David Armstrong, Danny Wallace and Steve Moran. Another four-goal performance a month later in a 4–3 win over West Bromwich Albion was the last appearance of Ian Baird, who left a few weeks later having scored twice in the win. Southampton climbed to fourth place in the table after a 2–0 win over Chelsea in March.

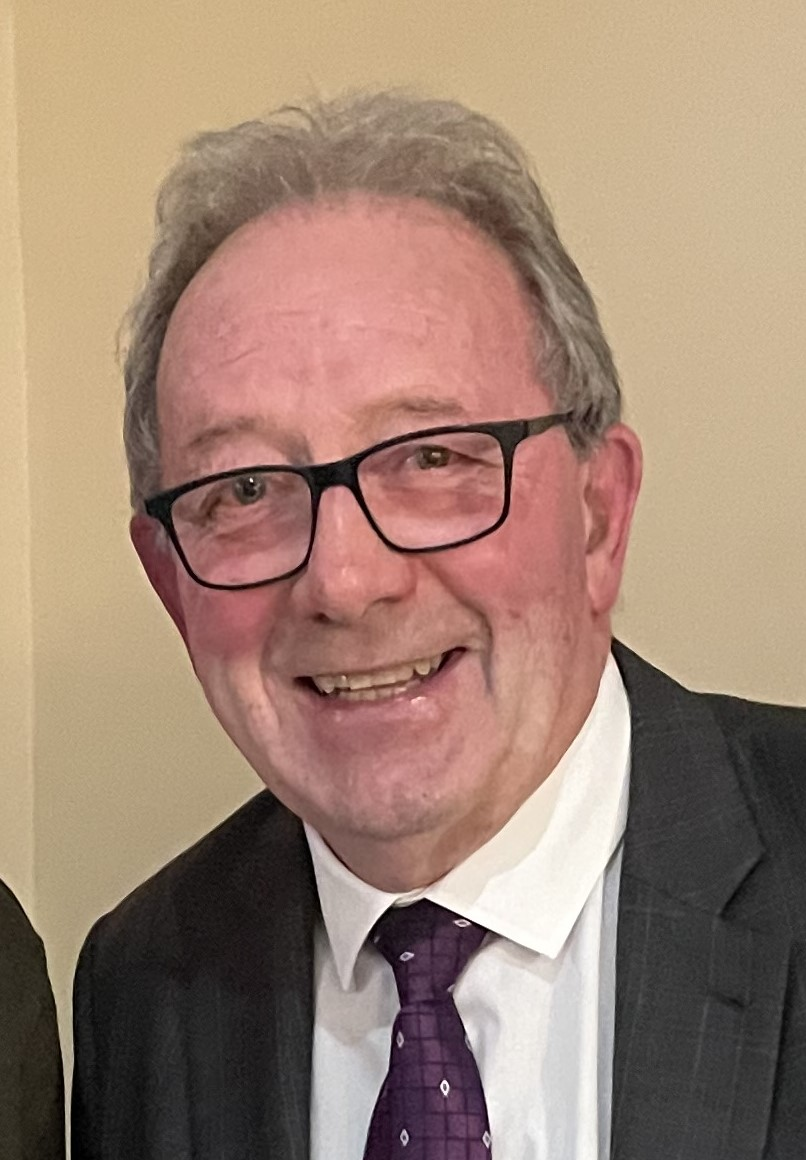
Jimmy Case joined Southampton in March 1985, appearing in all but one of the season's remaining games.

A three-game spell in which the club picked up just one point saw the club drop to eighth in the table. The two defeats in this run saw the Saints facing the top two sides in the league, picking up their biggest defeat of the season, 1–5, at Tottenham Hotspur, before experiencing a 1–2 defeat at home by eventual champions Everton. As they set their sights on a place in the next season's UEFA Cup, Southampton went on a short unbeaten run of five games in April, during which time they picked up vital wins over mid-table sides Luton Town (a 1–0 victory in which Wallace scored the only goal), Leicester City (an "end-to-end" contest which ended 3–1) and Aston Villa (a 2–0 win which featured the Football League debut of midfielder Andy Townsend). A 1–2 defeat at the hands of Newcastle United at the end of the month saw Southampton trailing in seventh place.

The last four games of the season included two wins – over relegation-fighting Ipswich Town and Coventry City – a final day 1–1 draw with runners-up Liverpool, and a 0–1 defeat to Arsenal. The result was a fifth-place finish for Southampton – their second highest in the top flight to date, and one which afforded them qualification to the UEFA Cup next season. However, due to the subsequent banning of English sides from UEFA competitions in the wake of the Heysel Stadium disaster, the club would not play in Europe until the 2003–04 season nearly 20 years later. 1984–85 was the last season to feature long-term manager Lawrie McMenemy, who left less than three weeks after the conclusion of the league to take over as Sunderland manager (where he would remain for just under two years). He was replaced before the start of the next season by former player Chris Nicholl, who had departed for an assistant-manager role at Grimsby Town just two years earlier, taking on his first role as a first-team manager.

=== List of match results ===
25 August 1984 1	Sunderland	3–1	Southampton	Sunderland
	Bennett 3'; Venison 8'; Proctor 70'		D. Armstrong 89'	Stadium: Roker Park; Attendance: 18,000

28 August 1984 2	Southampton	0–0	Manchester United	Southampton
				Stadium: The Dell; Attendance: 22,183

1 September 1984 3	Southampton	2–3	West Ham United	Southampton
	D. Armstrong 76'; Jordan 89'		Goddard 22', 45'; Dickens 88'	Stadium: The Dell; Attendance: 18,488

4 September 1984 4	Sheffield Wednesday	2–1	Southampton	Sheffield
	Varadi 39'; Shelton 86'		Jordan 72'	Stadium: Hillsborough Stadium; Attendance: 23,784

8 September 1984 5	Luton Town	1–1	Southampton	Luton
	Moss 53' (pen.)		Curtis 50'	Stadium: Kenilworth Road; Attendance: 8,657

15 September 1984 6	Southampton	2–1	Norwich City	Southampton
	Jordan 1'; Watson 66' (o.g.)			Stadium: The Dell; Attendance: 16,431

22 September 1984 7	Everton	2–2	Southampton	Liverpool
	Mountfield 1'; Sharp 9'		Moran 39', 53' (pen.)	Stadium: Goodison Park; Attendance: 22,354

29 September 1984 8	Southampton	1–1	Queens Park Rangers	Southampton
	Moran 64'		Fereday 29'	Stadium: The Dell; Attendance: 18,497

6 October 1984 9	Southampton	1–0	Tottenham Hotspur	Southampton
	Moran 30'			Stadium: The Dell; Attendance: 21,827

13 October 1984 10	Stoke City	1–3	Southampton	Stoke-on-Trent
	Heath 42'		Curtis 6'; Dyson 15' (o.g.); Williams 65'	Stadium: Victoria Ground; Attendance: 9,643

20 October 1984 11	Southampton	1–0	Chelsea	Southampton
	Moran 11'			Stadium: The Dell; Attendance: 20,212

27 October 1984 12	West Bromwich Albion	0–0	Southampton	West Bromwich
				Stadium: The Hawthorns; Attendance: 11,959

3 November 1984 13	Southampton	1–0	Nottingham Forest	Southampton
	Puckett 19'			Stadium: The Dell; Attendance: 17,818

10 November 1984 14	Liverpool	1–1	Southampton	Liverpool
	Rush 46'		Jordan 85'	Stadium: Anfield; Attendance: 36,382

17 November 1984 15	Aston Villa	2–2	Southampton	Birmingham
	Withe 25'; Six 44'		Jordan 55', 86'	Stadium: Villa Park; Attendance: 13,937

24 November 1984 16	Southampton	1–0	Newcastle United	Southampton
	D. Armstrong 45'			Stadium: The Dell; Attendance: 18,895

1 December 1984 17	Ipswich Town	0–1	Southampton	Ipswich
			D. Armstrong 46'	Stadium: Portman Road; Attendance: 14,113

8 December 1984 18	Southampton	1–0	Arsenal	Southampton
	Curtis 44'			Stadium: The Dell; Attendance: 20,243

15 December 1984 19	Coventry City	2–1	Southampton	Coventry
	Peake 52'; Shilton 58' (o.g.)		Jordan 69'	Stadium: Highfield Road; Attendance: 10,369

22 December 1984 20	West Ham United	2–3	Southampton	London
	Cottee 6', 75'		Walford 15' (o.g.); Jordan 59'; Wallace 74'	Stadium: Boleyn Ground; Attendance: 14,221

26 December 1984 21	Southampton	1–2	Watford	Southampton
	Curtis 71'		Blissett 44' (pen.), 69'	Stadium: The Dell; Attendance: 20,759

29 December 1984 22	Southampton	0–3	Sheffield Wednesday	Southampton
			Chapman 34', 51'; Varadi 53'	Stadium: The Dell; Attendance: 18,922

1 January 1985 23	Leicester City	1–2	Southampton	Leicester
	Banks 34'		D. Armstrong 19'; Wallace 74'	Stadium: Filbert Street; Attendance: 15,257

12 January 1985 24	Norwich City	1–0	Southampton	Norwich
	Deehan 52'			Stadium: Carrow Road; Attendance: 13,735

29 January 1985 25	Southampton	1–0	Sunderland	Southampton
	Jordan 35'			Stadium: The Dell; Attendance: 15,326

2 February 1985 26	Queens Park Rangers	0–4	Southampton	London
			Jordan 21'; D. Armstrong 53'; Wallace 62'; Moran 69'	Stadium: Loftus Road; Attendance: 10,664

23 February 1985 27	Nottingham Forest	2–0	Southampton	Nottingham
	Hodge 25'; Davenport 29' (pen.)			Stadium: City Ground; Attendance: 14,752

2 March 1985 28	Southampton	4–3	West Bromwich Albion	Southampton
	D. Armstrong 8'; Wallace 44'; Baird 50', 52'		Valentine 16'; Thompson 80', 85'	Stadium: The Dell; Attendance: 15,567

9 March 1985 29	Chelsea	0–2	Southampton	London
			D. Armstrong 51' (pen.); Wallace 87'	Stadium: Stamford Bridge; Attendance: 15,202

16 March 1985 30	Southampton	0–0	Stoke City	Southampton
				Stadium: The Dell; Attendance: 14,608

23 March 1985 31	Tottenham Hotspur	5–1	Southampton	London
	Ardiles 41'; Hoddle 66'; Falco 74'; Crooks 83'; Brooke 87'		Wallace 48'	Stadium: White Hart Lane; Attendance: 33,722

30 March 1985 32	Southampton	1–2	Everton	Southampton
	Jordan 89'		Richardson 48', 50'	Stadium: The Dell; Attendance: 18,754

2 April 1985 33	Southampton	1–0	Luton Town	Southampton
	Wallace 74'			Stadium: The Dell; Attendance: 14,006

6 April 1985 34	Watford	1–1	Southampton	Watford
	West 24'		Holmes 85'	Stadium: Vicarage Road; Attendance: 17,689

9 April 1985 35	Southampton	3–1	Leicester City	Southampton
	Bond 20' (pen.); Lawrence 50'; Jordan 86'		Lynex 46' (pen.)	Stadium: The Dell; Attendance: 15,638

20 April 1985 36	Southampton	2–0	Aston Villa	Southampton
	Moran 16'; D. Armstrong 77'			Stadium: The Dell; Attendance: 15,736

24 April 1985 37	Manchester United	0–0	Southampton	Manchester
				Stadium: Old Trafford; Attendance: 31,291

27 April 1985 38	Newcastle United	2–1	Southampton	Newcastle upon Tyne
	Reilly 69'; Wharton 82'		Case 45'	Stadium: St James' Park; Attendance: 20,771

4 May 1985 39	Southampton	3–0	Ipswich Town	Southampton
	Moran 54', 62', 76' (pen.)			Stadium: The Dell; Attendance: 16,156

6 May 1985 40	Arsenal	1–0	Southampton	London
	Rix 26'			Stadium: Arsenal Stadium; Attendance: 21,214

11 May 1985 41	Southampton	2–1	Coventry City	Southampton
	Stephens 5' (o.g.); Moran 75'		Regis 43'	Stadium: The Dell; Attendance: 15,735

14 May 1985 42	Southampton	1–1	Liverpool	Southampton
	D. Armstrong 53'		Wark 31'	Stadium: The Dell; Attendance: 23,001

=== Final league table ===
Pos	Team	Pld	W	D	L	GF	GA	GD	Pts	Qualification or relegation
3	Tottenham Hotspur	42	23	8	11	78	51	+27	77	Qualified for the Football League Super Cup and disqualified from the UEFA Cup
4	Manchester United (Note: Manchester United would have qualified for the Cup Winners' Cup as FA Cup winners.)	42	22	10	10	77	47	+30	76	Qualified for the Football League Super Cup and disqualified from the European Cup Winners' Cup
5	Southampton	42	19	11	12	56	47	+9	68	Qualified for the Football League Super Cup and disqualified from the UEFA Cup
6	Chelsea	42	18	12	12	63	48	+15	66	
7	Arsenal	42	19	9	14	61	49	+12	66	

Source: RSSSF
Rules for classification: 1) Points; 2) Goal difference; 3) Goals scored

=== Results by matchday ===
Round	1	2	3	4	5	6	7	8	9	10	11	12	13	14	15	16	17	18	19	20	21	22	23	24	25	26	27	28	29	30	31	32	33	34	35	36	37	38	39	40	41	42
Ground	A	H	H	A	A	H	A	H	H	A	H	A	H	A	A	H	A	H	A	A	H	H	A	A	H	A	A	H	A	H	A	H	H	A	H	H	A	A	H	A	H	H
Result	L	D	L	L	D	W	D	D	W	W	W	D	W	D	D	W	W	W	L	W	L	L	W	L	W	W	L	W	W	D	L	L	W	D	W	W	D	L	W	L	W	D
Position	19	18	22	22	22	18	18	18	15	12	8	9	9	7	8	7	5	5	5	5	6	9	6	8	7	7	8	8	4	5	8	8	5	6	6	5	6	6	5	5	5	5

Source: 11v11.com
A = Away; H = Home; W = Win; D = Draw; L = Loss

== FA Cup ==
Southampton entered the 1984–85 FA Cup against fellow First Division side Sunderland. Despite competing in the same league, the sides were mismatched as the Saints enjoyed a convincing 4–0 win at The Dell. Steve Moran opened the scoring just after half an hour, converting for the first time since October. Alan Curtis doubled the hosts' lead a minute before half time, taking advantage of a slip by Black Cats goalkeeper Chris Turner and chipping in for 2–0. After the break, Joe Jordan made it 3–0, before Moran scored a second later on to confirm Southampton's passage to the fourth round.

In their second FA Cup fixture of the season, Southampton were hosted by Third Division side Orient, who they had previously faced during the pre-season period. Despite facing pressure early on from the hosts, it was the visitors who scored the only goal of the first 45 minutes, when Jordan headed in a flick by Curtis from a long George Lawrence throw-in five minutes before the break. Five minutes into the second half, Moran headed in a free kick from David Armstrong to confirm the win; another headed goal by the striker from a Lawrence cross 15 minutes later was disallowed for offside.

After several postponements due to poor weather conditions, Southampton hosted Second Division club Barnsley in the fifth round of the tournament in March, with the winner set to face defending First Division champions Liverpool in the sixth round. Barnsley almost went ahead early on through young striker Steve Agnew, but it was the hosts who opened the scoring after a spell which saw six corners in 15 minutes, the last of which was converted by Moran from close range. Agnew equalised for the South Yorkshire side not long after, before going down for a penalty five minutes before half time, which was subsequently scored by Gordon Owen. In the second half, Southampton were unable to break down the visitors' defence, and the Second Division side went through to the next round (where they lost 0–4 to Liverpool).

5 January 1985 Round 3	Southampton	4–0	Sunderland	Southampton
	Moran 33'; Curtis 44'; Jordan 68'			Stadium: The Dell; Attendance: 15,516

26 January 1985 Round 4	Orient	0–2	Southampton	London
			Jordan 40'; Moran 50'	Stadium: Brisbane Road; Attendance: 17,622

4 March 1985 Round 5	Southampton	1–2	Barnsley	Southampton
	Moran		Agnew; Owen (pen.)	Stadium: The Dell; Attendance: 20,971

== League Cup ==
Southampton entered the 1984–85 League Cup against Third Division side Hull City. In the first leg at The Dell, the First Division hosts edged the fixture 3–2, with Steve Moran scoring a goal in each half, either side of a Joe Jordan header just before the hour mark. The second leg, at Boothferry Park, ended in a 2–2 draw to see the Saints progress in a 5–4 aggregate win. In the third round Southampton hosted Wolverhampton Wanderers, who were struggling in the Second Division. Despite the home advantage, the side were almost knocked out of the competition, trailing 1–2 for almost all of the second half; in the penultimate minute of the game, however, Danny Wallace converted a close range effort to force a replay. Wallace and Jordan scored the only two goals in the return game, sending Southampton through.

In the fourth round, Southampton were drawn at home game, this time hosting fellow First Division side Queens Park Rangers. The visitors opened the scoring after 35 minutes, when Terry Fenwick converted a penalty given for a foul committed by Steve Williams. It took until the 65th minute for the hosts to respond, with Alan Curtis finishing a move started by Wallace to make it 1–1 and force a replay. In the replay at Loftus Road, which then featured a "notorious artificial surface", neither team was able to break the deadlock and the game ended goalless – Southampton almost won the tie five minutes before the end, but Moran missed a penalty. A second replay was scheduled, with the venue decided by coin toss – Rangers won, hosting the Saints again just over a week later. This time, the hosts took full advantage of the setting, thrashing Southampton 4–0 to prevent them from making it past the fourth round for the sixth consecutive season – goals came from Gary Waddock, Warren Neill and Fenwick (two).

26 September 1984 Round 2 Leg 1	Southampton	3–2	Hull City	Southampton
	Moran 28', 65'; Jordan 59'		McEwan 41'; G. Roberts 80'	Stadium: The Dell; Attendance: 11,824

9 October 1984 Round 2 Leg 2	Hull City	2–2 (4–5 agg.)	Southampton	Kingston upon Hull
	Flounders 34'; Whitehurst 86'		Wallace 13'; Moran 50'	Stadium: Boothferry Park; Attendance: 16,393

30 October 1984 Round 3	Southampton	2–2	Wolverhampton Wanderers	Southampton
	Wright 35'; Wallace 89'		Melrose 22', 47'	Stadium: The Dell; Attendance: 14,164

6 November 1984 Round 3 Replay	Wolverhampton Wanderers	0–2	Southampton	Wolverhampton
			Wallace 13'; Jordan 89'	Stadium: Molineux Stadium; Attendance: 13,064

20 November 1984 Round 4	Southampton	1–1	Queens Park Rangers	Southampton
	Curtis 65'		Fenwick 35' (pen.)	Stadium: The Dell; Attendance: 14,830

27 November 1984 Round 4 Replay 1	Queens Park Rangers	0–0	Southampton	London
				Stadium: Loftus Road; Attendance: 13,754

5 December 1984 Round 4 Replay 2	Queens Park Rangers	4–0	Southampton	London
	Waddock 20'; Neill 41'; Fenwick 46', 56' (pen.)			Stadium: Loftus Road; Attendance: 12,702

== UEFA Cup ==
Southampton were drawn in the first round of the 1984–85 UEFA Cup against Bundesliga runners-up Hamburger SV. In the first leg at home, the Saints were held to a goalless draw against the German visitors; after the game, manager Lawrie McMenemy commented that "We had the chances, but we didn't knock them in". In the return leg at the Volksparkstadion, the English side held the hosts for much of the game, before giving away a penalty in the second half which was scored by Manfred Kaltz. In the final minute, Mark McGhee doubled the hosts' lead to see Southampton exit the tournament at the first hurdle.

19 September 1984 Round 1 Leg 1	Southampton	0–0	(Germany) Hamburger SV	Southampton
				Stadium: The Dell; Attendance: 19,178

3 October 1984 Round 1 Leg 2	(Germany) Hamburger SV	2–0	Southampton	Hamburg, Germany
	Kaltz 68' (pen.); McGhee 90'			Stadium: Volksparkstadion; Attendance: 32,000

== Other matches ==
Southampton played four additional games during the 1984–85 season. A few weeks into the league campaign, the club were hosted by Fourth Division side Swindon Town in a testimonial. The Saints won the tie 1–0, with David Puckett scoring the only goal of the game. A few months later, between fixtures in December, the club played a couple of friendlies in Saudi Arabia – they first drew 2–2 with Al Hilal (both Southampton goals were scored by Joe Jordan), before defeating Al-Ittihad, who had finished second in the Saudi Pro League the previous year, 3–1. The final unofficial game of the season came towards the end of the campaign in April, as Southampton faced Grimsby Town in a testimonial for Bob Cumming. The game ended in a 1–1 draw, with Moran scoring the only goal for the First Division visitors.

11 September 1984 Williams & Canley Testimonial	Swindon Town	0–1	Southampton	Swindon
			Puckett	Stadium: County Ground

3 December 1984 Friendly	(Saudi Arabia) Al Hilal	2–2	Southampton	Riyadh, Saudi Arabia
			Jordan

5 December 1984 Friendly	(Saudi Arabia) Al-Ittihad	1–3	Southampton	Jeddah, Saudi Arabia
			Moran; Baker

16 April 1985 Bob Cummings Testimonial	Grimsby Town	1–1	Southampton	Cleethorpes
			Moran	Stadium: Blundell Park

== Player details ==
Southampton used 23 different players during the 1984–85 season, 13 of whom scored during the campaign. Only right-back Mick Mills appeared in all 54 games across all four competitions, with goalkeeper Peter Shilton one behind – missing a single league fixture in November. Steve Moran finished as the season's top goalscorer again, with a total of 18 goals in all competitions – 11 in the league, four in the FA Cup and three in the League Cup. New signing Joe Jordan was Southampton's top goalscorer in the league, with one more goal than Moran (he also scored two each in the FA Cup and League Cup).

=== Squad statistics ===
Name	Pos.	Nat.	League		FA Cup		League Cup		UEFA Cup		Total	
Name	Pos.	Nat.	Apps.	Gls.	Apps.	Gls.	Apps.	Gls.	Apps.	Gls.	Apps.	Gls.
David Armstrong	MF	(England)	35	10	3	0	4	0	1	0	43	10
Steve Baker	DF	(England)	6(3)	0	0	0	0	0	1	0	7(3)	0
Kevin Bond	DF	(England)	32(1)	1	3	0	7	0	0	0	42(1)	1
Kevan Brown	DF	(England)	0	0	0	0	0	0	0	0	0	0
Jimmy Case	MF	(England)	10	1	0	0	0	0	0	0	10	1
Eamonn Collins	MF	(Republic of Ireland)	1(2)	0	0	0	0(1)	0	0	0	1(3)	0
Alan Curtis	FW	(Wales)	25(5)	4	3	1	7	1	1	0	36(5)	6
Mark Dennis	DF	(England)	31	0	3	0	7	0	2	0	43	0
Ivan Golac	DF	(Socialist Federal Republic of Yugoslavia)	4	0	0	0	0	0	0	0	4	0
Nick Holmes	MF	(England)	29	1	1	0	7	0	2	0	39	1
Joe Jordan	FW	(Scotland)	34	12	3	2	7	2	2	0	46	16
Phil Kite	GK	(England)	1	0	0	0	0	0	0	0	1	0
George Lawrence	MF	(England)	12(1)	1	2(1)	0	0	0	0	0	14(2)	1
Mick Mills	DF	(England)	42	0	3	0	7	0	2	0	54	0
Steve Moran	FW	(England)	32	11	3	4	5	3	1(1)	0	41(1)	18
David Puckett	FW	(England)	6(7)	1	0(1)	0	0(3)	0	0	0	6(11)	1
Peter Shilton	GK	(England)	41	0	3	0	7	0	2	0	53	0
Andy Townsend	MF	(Republic of Ireland)	5	0	0	0	0	0	0	0	5	0
Danny Wallace	MF	(England)	33	7	3	0	7	3	2	0	45	10
Mark Whitlock	DF	(England)	19(3)	0	0	0	2	0	2	0	23(3)	0
Mark Wright	DF	(England)	36	0	3	0	5	1	2	0	46	1
Players with appearances who left before the end of the season
Reuben Agboola	DF	(Nigeria)	9	0	0	0	2	0	0	0	11	0
Ian Baird	FW	(England)	5	2	0	0	0(1)	0	0	0	5(1)	2
Steve Williams	MF	(England)	14	1	0	0	3	0	2	0	19	1

=== Most appearances ===
Rank	Name	Pos.	League		FA Cup		League Cup		UEFA Cup		Total		
Rank	Name	Pos.	Starts	Subs	Starts	Subs	Starts	Subs	Starts	Subs	Starts	Subs	Total
1	Mick Mills	DF	42	0	3	0	7	0	2	0	54	0	54
2	Peter Shilton	GK	41	0	3	0	7	0	2	0	53	0	53
3	Joe Jordan	FW	34	0	3	0	7	0	2	0	46	0	46
3	Mark Wright	DF	36	0	3	0	5	0	2	0	46	0	46
5	Danny Wallace	MF	33	0	3	0	7	0	2	0	45	0	45
6	David Armstrong	MF	35	0	3	0	4	0	1	0	43	0	43
6	Mark Dennis	DF	31	0	3	0	7	0	2	0	43	0	43
6	Kevin Bond	DF	32	1	3	0	7	0	0	0	42	1	43
9	Steve Moran	FW	32	0	3	0	5	0	1	1	41	1	42
10	Alan Curtis	FW	25	5	3	0	7	0	1	0	36	5	41

=== Top goalscorers ===
Rank	Name	Pos.	League		FA Cup		League Cup		UEFA Cup		Total		
Rank	Name	Pos.	Goals	Apps	Goals	Apps	Goals	Apps	Goals	Apps	Goals	Apps	GPG
1	Steve Moran	FW	11	32	4	3	3	5	0	1	18	41	0.44
2	Joe Jordan	FW	12	34	2	3	2	7	0	2	16	46	0.35
3	David Armstrong	MF	10	35	0	3	0	4	0	1	10	43	0.23
3	Danny Wallace	MF	7	33	0	3	3	7	0	2	10	45	0.22
5	Alan Curtis	FW	4	30	1	3	1	7	0	1	6	41	0.15
6	Ian Baird	FW	2	5	0	0	0	1	0	0	2	6	0.33
7	Jimmy Case	MF	1	10	0	0	0	0	0	0	1	10	0.10
7	George Lawrence	MF	1	13	0	3	0	0	0	0	1	16	0.06
7	David Puckett	FW	1	13	0	1	0	3	0	0	1	17	0.06
7	Steve Williams	MF	1	14	0	0	0	3	0	2	1	19	0.05
7	Nick Holmes	MF	1	29	0	1	0	7	0	2	1	39	0.03
7	Kevin Bond	DF	1	33	0	3	0	7	0	0	1	43	0.02
7	Mark Wright	DF	0	36	0	3	1	5	0	2	1	46	0.02

== Bibliography ==
- Chalk, Gary; Holley, Duncan (10 August 1987), A Complete Record of Southampton Football Club: 1885–1987, Derby, England: Breedon Books, ISBN 978-0907969228
- Chalk, Gary; Holley, Duncan; Bull, David (28 November 2013), All the Saints: A Complete Who's Who of Southampton FC, Bristol, England: Hagiology Publishing, ISBN 978-0992686406
- Holley, Duncan; Chalk, Gary (2003), Bull, David (ed.), In That Number: A Post-War Chronicle of Southampton FC, Bristol, England: Hagiology Publishing, ISBN 0-9534474-3-X
- Juson, Dave; Aldworth, Clay; Bendel, Barry; Bull, David; Chalk, Gary (10 November 2004), Saints v Pompey: A History of Unrelenting Rivalry, Bristol, England: Hagiology Publishing, ISBN 978-0953447459
