= 1984–85 Aston Villa F.C. season =

English football club season

Aston Villa
1984–85 season
- Chairman: Doug Ellis
- Manager: Graham Turner
- Stadium: Villa Park
- First Division: 10th
- FA Cup: Third round
- League Cup: Third round
- Top goalscorer: Paul Rideout (14 goals)

The 1984–85 English football season was Aston Villa's 86th season in the Football League. Graham Turner left Shrewsbury after six seasons to take charge of Aston Villa in the summer of 1984.

There were debuts for Tony Daley (233), David Norton (44), Darren Bradley (20), Kevin Poole (28) and Didier Six (15).

On 13 April 1985, Villa Park hosted the FA Cup semi-final with holders Everton reaching the final by beating Luton 2–1.

== First Division ==
Pos	Team	Pld	W	D	L	GF	GA	GD	Pts
8	Sheffield Wednesday	42	17	14	11	58	45	+13	65
9	Nottingham Forest	42	19	7	16	56	48	+8	64
10	Aston Villa	42	15	11	16	60	60	0	56
11	Watford	42	14	13	15	81	71	+10	55
12	West Bromwich Albion	42	16	7	19	58	62	−4	55

Source: World Football
Rules for classification: 1) Points; 2) Goal difference; 3) Goals scored

25 August 1984	Aston Villa	1–0	Coventry City	Villa Park
	Des Bremner 53'	Report
Note:

27 August 1984	Stoke City	1–3	Aston Villa	Victoria Ground
		Report	Mark Walters 14', 41'; Peter Withe 88'
Note: Newcastle United and Villa both have two wins from their opening two matches while Stoke City and Everton are still looking for their first point. Paul Walsh scores after 14 seconds of his home debut for Liverpool, a 3–0 win over West Ham United.

1 September 1984	Newcastle United	3–0	Aston Villa	St James' Park
		Report
Note: Newcastle beat Aston Villa 3–0 to top the league with the First Division's only 100% record after three games. Crowd trouble interrupts the match between Coventry City and Leicester City at Highfield Road. Peter Davenport scores a hat-trick as Nottingham Forest beat Sunderland 3–1 and Derby County's Kevin Wilson also scores three in his side's 3–2 win over Bolton Wanderers. Earlier in the week, Wilson scored four in a Milk Cup tie against Hartlepool United.

5 September 1984	Aston Villa	0–5	Nottingham Forest	Villa Park
		Report
Note: Nottingham Forest go top after a Trevor Christie hat-trick helps them to a resounding 5–0 win at Aston Villa.

8 September 1984	Aston Villa	4–2	Chelsea	Villa Park
	Peter Withe 6', 27'; Steve Foster 35'; Paul Rideout 69'	Report

15 September 1984	Watford	3–3	Aston Villa	Vicarage Road
		Report	Steve Foster 45'; Peter Withe 57'; Steve McMahon 77'

22 September 1984	Aston Villa	0–1	Tottenham Hotspur	Villa Park
		Report

29 September 1984	Ipswich Town	3–0	Aston Villa	Portman Road
		Report

6 October 1984	Aston Villa	3–0	Manchester United	Villa Park
	Peter Withe 20'; Allan Evans 25'; Paul Rideout 55'	Report
Note: Arsenal are back on top of the table – a Charlie Nicholas penalty gives them victory over Everton while Tottenham lose 1–0 at Southampton. Liverpool's woes continue as West Bromwich Albion hold them to a goalless draw at Anfield. The last unbeaten record in Division One goes as Manchester United lose 3–0 at Aston Villa. On-loan French winger Didier Six stars on his Villa debut. With Oxford losing 1–0 at Manchester City – their first defeat away from home since February – Portsmouth are now the only side yet to be beaten in the league this season.

13 October 1984	Everton	2–1	Aston Villa	Goodison Park
		Report	Peter Withe 44'

20 October 1984	Aston Villa	2–2	Norwich City	Villa Park
	Peter Withe 17', 69'	Report

27 October 1984	Leicester City	5–0	Aston Villa	Filbert Street
		Report
Note: In-form Everton thrash Manchester United 5–0, United's biggest margin of defeat since losing 6–0 at Ipswich in March 1980. Leaders Arsenal are beaten 3–1 at West Ham. Tottenham nail Stoke to the bottom of the First Division with a 4–0 win at White Hart Lane. Leicester striker Gary Lineker scores a hat-trick in his side's 5–0 win over Aston Villa.

3 November 1984	Aston Villa	0–0	West Ham United	Villa Park
		Report

10 November 1984	Arsenal	1–1	Aston Villa	Highbury
		Report	Paul Birch 9'
Note: Everton stay top with a 1–0 win over West Ham at Upton Park. Manchester United and Tottenham also win away but Arsenal are held at home by Aston Villa. In the Third Division, Hull City come from 4–1 down to win 5–4 at Orient.

17 November 1984	Aston Villa	2–2	Southampton	Villa Park
	Peter Withe 26'; Didier Six 44'	Report

24 November 1984	Queens Park Rangers	2–0	Aston Villa	Loftus Road
		Report

1 December 1984	Aston Villa	1–0	Sunderland	Villa Park
	Paul Rideout 84'	Report

8 December 1984	Luton Town	1–0	Aston Villa	Kenilworth Road
		Report

15 December 1984	Aston Villa	0–0	Liverpool	Villa Park
		Report

22 December 1984	Aston Villa	4–0	Newcastle United	Villa Park
	Allan Evans 35' (pen); Paul Rideout 38', 62', 85'	Report

26 December 1984	Sheffield Wednesday	1–1	Aston Villa	Hillsborough Stadium
		Report	Paul Rideout 41'

29 December 1984	Nottingham Forest	3–2	Aston Villa	City Ground
		Report	Colin Gibson 17'; Paul Rideout 34'

1 January 1985	Aston Villa	3–1	West Bromwich Albion	Villa Park
	Colin Gibson 29'; Paul Birch 57'; Paul Rideout 60'	Report

19 January 1985	Coventry City	0–3	Aston Villa	Highfield Road
		Report	Mark Walters 32', 71'; Paul Rideout 65'
Note: Arctic conditions decimate today's fixture programme with only 10 matches played across the four divisions. Three survive in Division One – Liverpool beat Norwich 4–0 while Aston Villa win 3–0 at Coventry and Chelsea draw 1–1 with Arsenal. In the Second Division, Manchester City move into the top three by beating Wimbledon 3–0 and a Tommy Wright hat-trick helps Leeds to a 5–0 win over Notts County.

2 February 1985	Aston Villa	2–1	Ipswich Town	Villa Park
	Gordon Cowans 38'; Colin Gibson 80'	Report

23 February 1985	West Ham United	1–2	Aston Villa	Boleyn Ground
		Report	Mark Walters 58'; Brendan Ormsby 74'

2 March 1985	Aston Villa	0–1	Leicester City	Villa Park
		Report

9 March 1985	Norwich City	2–2	Aston Villa	Carrow Road
		Report	Allan Evans 58' (pen), 71' (pen)

13 March 1985	Aston Villa	0–0	Arsenal	Villa Park
		Report

16 March 1985	Aston Villa	1–1	Everton	Villa Park
	Allan Evans 83' (pen)	Report

23 March 1985	Manchester United	4–0	Aston Villa	Old Trafford
		Report
Note: Osvaldo Ardiles marks his first appearance of the season with the opening goal in Tottenham's 5–1 win over Southampton. Everton beat Arsenal 2–0 to virtually extinguish the Gunners' waning championship hopes. Hat-tricks for Manchester United's Mark Hughes against Aston Villa and John Wark for Liverpool at West Bromwich Albion. In Division Two, Oxford move up to second with a 3–0 win over leaders Manchester City.

27 March 1985	Aston Villa	2–0	Stoke City	Villa Park
	Own goal 73'; Didier Six 85'	Report

30 March 1985	Tottenham Hotspur	0–2	Aston Villa	White Hart Lane
		Report	Paul Rideout 21'; Mark Walters 75'
Note: Two goals by reserve midfielder Kevin Richardson give Everton a 2–1 win at Southampton which takes them three points clear of Tottenham, who lose 2–0 at home to Aston Villa. Manchester City's lead in Division Two is cut to two points after a 2–2 draw with bottom club Cardiff. Oxford, Birmingham and Blackburn all win while Portsmouth draw at Shrewsbury.

6 April 1985	Aston Villa	3–0	Sheffield Wednesday	Villa Park
	Paul Rideout 27'; Brendan Ormsby 74'; Allan Evans 77' (pen)	Report

8 April 1985	West Bromwich Albion	1–0	Aston Villa	The Hawthorns
		Report

16 April 1985	Chelsea	3–1	Aston Villa	Stamford Bridge
		Report	Mark Walters 80'

20 April 1985	Southampton	2–0	Aston Villa	The Dell
		Report
Note: Having joined hometown club Aston Villa as an apprentice, Tony Daley made his senior debut, aged 17.

24 April 1985	Aston Villa	1–1	Watford	Villa Park
	Mark Walters 20'	Report

27 April 1985	Aston Villa	5–2	Queens Park Rangers	Villa Park
	Paul Rideout 16', 38'; Peter Withe 41', 53'; Mark Walters 48'	Report

4 May 1985	Sunderland	0–4	Aston Villa	Roker Park
		Report	Colin Gibson 21'; Mark Walters 34'; Steve McMahon 57'; Peter Withe 72'
Note: Many promotion and relegation issues remain undecided on the penultimate Saturday of the League season. In Division One, six of the bottom seven lose, the exception being Luton who beat Arsenal 3–1. Sunderland look doomed following a 4–0 home defeat by Aston Villa. Birmingham and Hull confirm their promotions while Darlington are poised to join Chesterfield, Bury and Blackpool in going up from Division Four.

6 May 1985	Aston Villa	0–1	Luton Town	Villa Park
		Report

11 May 1985	Liverpool	2–1	Aston Villa	Anfield
		Report	Paul Birch 85'

Source: avfchistory.co.uk

== FA Cup ==
Teams from the Football League First and Second Division entered in this round. Most of the third round of games in the FA Cup were played over the weekend 4–6 January 1985, with the exception of the Gillingham-Cardiff City match. Replays took place at various times over the period 8–28 January.

Burton Albion (Step 6) was again the lowest-ranked team in the round. The FA ordered their tie with Leicester City to a replay behind closed doors after the Albion goalkeeper had been struck by a bottle in the first game (played at the Baseball Ground in Derby) which had ended in a 6–1 win for Leicester. The replay was held at Coventry City's Highfield Road stadium.

Tie no	Home team	Score	Away team	Date
1	Liverpool (1)	3–0	Aston Villa (1)	5 January 1985

== League Cup ==
=== Second round ===
A total of 64 teams took place in this round. All ties were settled over two legs.

Home team	First Leg	Second Leg	Agg.	Away team	Dates	
Home team	First Leg	Second Leg	Agg.	Away team	First Leg	Second Leg
Scunthorpe United	2–3	1–3	3–6	Aston Villa	24 September 1984	10 October 1984

=== Third round ===
The competitors in the Third round were made up from the 32 winners from the Second round.

Home team	Result	Away team	Date
Queens Park Rangers	1–0	Aston Villa	30 October 1984
