= Mark Whitlock =

English footballer

Personal information
- Full name: Mark Whitlock
- Date of birth: 14 March 1961 (age 65)
- Place of birth: Portsmouth, England
- Height: 6 ft 0 in (1.83 m)
- Position: Centre back

Youth career
- Sarisbury Sparks
- 1975–1979: Southampton

Senior career*
Years	Team	Apps	(Gls)
1979–1986	Southampton	61	(1)
1982	→ Grimsby Town (loan)	8	(0)
1983	→ Aldershot (loan)	14	(0)
1986–1988	Bournemouth	99	(1)
1988–1990	Reading	27	(0)
1990–1992	Aldershot	39	(2)
1992–19??	Aerostructures S & S		
Total		248	(4)
- * Club domestic league appearances and goals

Mark Whitlock (born 14 March 1961) is an English retired footballer. Primarily a centre back, Whitlock played initially for Hampshire-based club Southampton, before moving to local rivals Bournemouth in 1986, Reading in 1988, and Aldershot in 1990.

== Club career ==
Whitlock was born in Portsmouth and was educated at Bridgemary School. He played youth football with Sarisbury Sparks. He began his career as a youth player with Southampton, starting as an associate schoolboy in October 1975 before becoming an apprentice in August 1977 and signing professional terms in March 1979, having already played regularly in the reserve-team since December 1977.

He made his league debut for the club in September 1981, playing the full 90 minutes of a 4–1 win over Wolverhampton Wanderers in the First Division, and scored his first goal in March 1982 against Stoke City. After spending spells on loan at Grimsby Town and Aldershot in the 1982–83 season, he became a semi-regular starting player in the 1983–84 season, and made a total of 61 appearances in all competitions before leaving the club in July 1986. Described as a "quiet, effective central defender", he initially vied with Ken Armstong to be centre-back, before the emergence of Mark Wright and the signing of Kevin Bond in September 1984 led to him being deployed in various midfield roles.

Along with Saints' teammate David Puckett, Whitlock was transferred to local side Bournemouth in July 1986 as part of a deal which saw Northern Irish striker Colin Clarke moving to The Dell. He helped Bournemouth win their first Third Division championship in his first season with the club. Whitlock remained with Bournemouth for the following season, when the team finished 17th in the Second Division, but left less than halfway through the 1988–89 campaign to move back down a division with Reading. The defender stayed with Reading until the end of the 1989–90 season, at which point he moved to Fourth Division side Aldershot until the club was dissolved in 1992.

== Later career ==
On retiring from League football, Whitlock found employment as a security guard, and turned out occasionally for the Aerostructures works team at Hamble.

== Honours ==
Bournemouth

- Football League Third Division: 1986–87
