= Ken Armstrong =

Ken Armstrong may refer to:

- Ken Armstrong (Australian footballer) (1936–2009), Australian rules football player and coach for Perth and later commentator
- Ken Armstrong (diver) (born 1953), Canadian Olympic diver
- Ken Armstrong (footballer, born 1924) (1924–1984), Chelsea F.C. footballer, and English and New Zealand dual-international
- Ken Armstrong (footballer, born 1959) (1959–2022), English-born footballer who played with among others Kilmarnock F.C. and Birmingham City F.C.
- Ken Armstrong (journalist), American journalist
- Ken Armstrong (motorcyclist), Grand Prix motorcycle racer from Great Britain
- Ken Armstrong (rugby union) (1931–2017), Irish rugby union player
