= Ian Juryeff =

English footballer

Personal information
- Full name: Ian Martin Juryeff
- Date of birth: 24 November 1962 (age 63)
- Place of birth: Gosport, England
- Height: 5 ft 11 in (1.80 m)
- Position: Forward

Youth career
- 1977–1980: Southampton

Senior career*
Years	Team	Apps	(Gls)
1980–1985	Southampton	2	(0)
1984	→ IFK Munkfors (loan)	19	(15)
1984	→ Mansfield Town (loan)	12	(5)
1984–1985	→ Reading (loan)	7	(1)
1985–1989	Orient	111	(45)
1989	→ Ipswich Town (loan)	2	(0)
1989	Halifax Town	17	(7)
1989–1990	Hereford United	28	(4)
1990–1992	Halifax Town	72	(13)
1992–1993	Darlington	33	(6)
1993–1995	Scunthorpe United	44	(13)
1995–1996	Farnborough Town		
1996	Fareham Town		
1996–1997	Havant Town		
1997–1998	Weston-super-Mare		
1998	Newport (IOW)		
1998–1999	Bashley		
- * Club domestic league appearances and goals

Ian Martin Juryeff (born 24 November 1962) is an English former professional footballer who played as a forward for various Football League clubs in the 1980s and 1990s. He started his career as a trainee with Southampton, but only made two substitute appearances in the First Division in 1983 before being released. After several loan spells, he then had a ten-year career in the lower leagues, including over four years at Orient.

After ceasing to play in the Football League, he qualified as a sports scientist and was employed as a community football development officer, while continuing to play non-League football on a part-time basis. He then became a coach, working with youth teams at Southampton and Chelsea. Since April 2012, he has been first-team trainer and technical director at minor French club, US Gonnehem from the Pas-de-Calais department.

== Football career ==
Juryeff was born in Gosport and attended Bridgemary School. He joined Southampton as an associate schoolboy in December 1977, before being taken on as an apprentice in August 1979, following which he signed his first professional contract in February 1980. He made his debut for the reserve team on 21 October 1980, when he scored in a 5–3 victory over Crystal Palace, after which he was a regular in the reserves, scoring eight goals from 13 appearances in 1980–81.

With the "Saints" having finished as runners-up in the First Division in 1980–81 with players such as Kevin Keegan, Mick Channon and David Armstrong, there were no first-team opportunities for Juryeff and he continued to play in the reserves, with 16 goals from 27 appearances in 1981–82. In 1982, he switched to a more defensive role and made 37 appearances in 1982–83, mainly as a defensive midfielder, only scoring three goals.

His versatility earned him the place as substitute for the first-team and he made his debut at Coventry City on 26 November 1983 as a 77th minute replacement for midfielder Steve Williams who had been injured by a head-butt from Stephen Hunt, for which Hunt was sent-off. Juryeff's next appearance came four days later, at Leicester City, when he replaced Mark Dennis in defence.

Juryeff remained with Southampton until February 1985, but spent spells on loan to IFK Munkfors in Sweden, and then at Mansfield Town from March to May 1984, followed by a loan to Reading from November 1984 to January 1985.

Juryeff joined Orient in February 1985, then of the Football League Third Division. Juryeff was unable to prevent Orient being relegated at the end of the season, although they were promoted back via the play-offs in 1989. Juryeff remained at the Brisbane Road club for 4 1/2 years, scoring 45 goals from 111 League appearances. In February 1989, he had a short period on loan to Ipswich Town for whom he made two substitute appearances.

In August 1989, he joined Halifax Town but was sold to Hereford United in December 1989 for a fee of £50,000. He remained with Hereford for nine months, before being transferred back to Halifax for the same fee, a record transfer fee paid by Halifax Town.

His Football League career finished with Darlington (from August 1992 to August 1993) and Scunthorpe United (from August 1993 to March 1995).

He then played for several non-league clubs on a part-time basis, including Farnborough Town, Fareham Town, Havant Town, Weston Super Mare, Newport (IOW) and Bashley, where he ended his playing career in 1999.

== Coaching career ==
After retiring from full-time football, Juryeff studied at Farnborough College of Technology from where he graduated with a degree in Sports Science, going on to qualify as a UEFA Level Four coach. In 1997, he was appointed the Assistant Community Officer at Charlton Athletic before taking up the post of Community Football Development Office at Southampton in September 1997.

In July 2003, Juryeff was appointed head coach at Bath City of the Southern League Premier Division under manager Alan Pridham but resigned six weeks later, for "personal reasons".

He then returned to Southampton, where he became a youth coach at the Saints Academy, working with players such as Theo Walcott and Alex Oxlade-Chamberlain, before joining Chelsea in 2009 as a Community Coach, also working with the under-19 women's team.

In April 2012, he was appointed first-team trainer and technical director at minor French club, US Gonnehem from the Pas-de-Calais department.
