= 1975–76 Anglo-Scottish Cup =

Tournament details
- Country: England; Scotland
- Teams: 24

Final positions
- Champions: Middlesbrough
- Runners-up: Fulham

The 1975–76 Anglo-Scottish Cup was the first edition of the tournament which replaced the Texaco Cup. It was won by Middlesbrough, who beat Fulham in a two-legged final by 1–0 on aggregate.

== English group ==
=== Group A ===
Home team	Result	Away team	Date
Carlisle United	2–0	Newcastle United	2 August 1975
Middlesbrough	3–2	Sunderland	2 August 1975
Middlesbrough	4–1	Carlisle United	5 August 1975
Newcastle United	0–2	Sunderland	6 August 1975
Newcastle United	2–2	Middlesbrough	9 August 1975
Sunderland	0–1	Carlisle United	9 August 1975

Team	Pld	W	D	L	GF	GA	GD	BP	Pts
Middlesbrough	3	2	1	0	9	5	+4	2	7
Carlisle United	3	2	0	1	4	4	0	0	4
Sunderland	3	1	0	2	4	4	0	0	2
Newcastle United	3	0	1	2	2	6	-4	0	1

=== Group B ===
Home team	Result	Away team	Date
Hull City	1–0	Leicester City	2 August 1975
West Bromwich Albion	1–1	Mansfield Town	2 August 1975
Hull City	1–2	West Bromwich Albion	6 August 1975
Mansfield Town	2–0	Leicester City	6 August 1975
Leicester City	2–1	West Bromwich Albion	9 August 1975
Mansfield Town	2–1	Hull City	9 August 1975

Team	Pld	W	D	L	GF	GA	GD	BP	Pts
Mansfield Town	3	2	1	0	5	2	+3	0	5
West Bromwich Albion	3	1	1	1	4	4	0	0	3
Leicester City	3	1	1	1	3	4	-1	0	3
Hull City	3	0	1	2	3	5	-2	0	1

=== Group C ===
Home team	Result	Away team	Date
Blackpool	1–0	Manchester City	2 August 1975
Sheffield United	3–1	Blackburn Rovers	2 August 1975
Blackburn Rovers	1–0	Manchester City	6 August 1975
Blackpool	1–1	Sheffield United	6 August 1975
Blackburn Rovers	3–2	Blackpool	9 August 1975
Manchester City	3–1	Sheffield United	9 August 1975

Team	Pld	W	D	L	GF	GA	GD	BP	Pts
Blackburn Rovers	3	2	0	1	5	5	0	1	5
Sheffield United	3	1	1	1	5	5	0	1	4
Blackpool	3	1	1	1	4	4	0	0	3
Manchester City	3	1	0	2	3	3	0	1	3

=== Group D ===
Home team	Result	Away team	Date
Chelsea	1–0	Bristol City	2 August 1975
Norwich City	1–2	Fulham	2 August 1975
Fulham	2–2	Bristol City	5 August 1975
Chelsea	1–1	Norwich City	6 August 1975
Bristol City	4–1	Norwich City	9 August 1975
Fulham	1–0	Chelsea	9 August 1975

Team	Pld	W	D	L	GF	GA	GD	BP	Pts
Fulham	3	2	1	0	5	3	+2	0	5
Bristol City	3	1	1	1	6	4	+2	1	4
Chelsea	3	1	1	1	2	2	0	0	3
Norwich City	3	0	1	2	3	7	-4	0	1

== Scottish group ==
=== 1st round 1st leg ===
Home team	Result	Away team	Date
Aberdeen	1–1	St Johnstone	30 July 1975
Ayr United	1–0	Falkirk	2 August 1975
Queen of the South	2–3	Hearts	2 August 1975
Motherwell	1–1	Dundee	4 August 1975

=== 1st round 2nd leg ===
Home team	Result	Away team	Date
Dundee	0–1	Motherwell	6 August 1975
Falkirk	2–2	Ayr United	6 August 1975
St Johnstone	0–2	Aberdeen	6 August 1975
Hearts	3-1	Queen of the South	3 September 1975

== Quarter-finals 1st leg ==
Home team	Result	Away team	Date
Ayr United	0–0	Mansfield Town	15 September 1975
Fulham	3–2	Hearts	16 September 1975
Middlesbrough	2–0	Aberdeen	16 September 1975
Blackburn Rovers	0–0	Motherwell	17 September 1975

== Quarter-finals 2nd leg ==
Home team	Result	Away team	Date
Mansfield Town	2–0	Ayr United	29 September 1975
Motherwell	2–1	Blackburn Rovers	30 September 1975
Aberdeen	2–5	Middlesbrough	1 October 1975
Hearts	2–2	Fulham	1 October 1975

== Semi-finals 1st leg ==
Home team	Result	Away team	Date
Fulham	1–1	Motherwell	21 October 1975
Middlesbrough	3–0	Mansfield Town	21 October 1975

== Semi-finals 2nd leg ==
Home team	Result	Away team	Date
Mansfield Town	0–2	Middlesbrough	3 November 1975
Motherwell	2–3	Fulham	4 November 1975

== Final 1st leg ==
26 November 1975
19:30 BST

Middlesbrough	1 – 0	Fulham
Armstrong

Ayresome Park, Middlesbrough
Attendance: 15,000

== Final 2nd leg ==
9 December 1975
19:30 BST

Fulham	0 – 0	Middlesbrough

Craven Cottage, London
Attendance: 13,723

== Notes and references ==
- "Anglo-Scottish Cup 1975/1976". Football Club History Database.
