= Dave Norton =

Former professional footballer who played as a midfielder

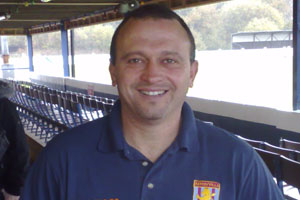

Personal information
- Full name: David Wayne Norton
- Date of birth: 3 March 1965 (age 61)
- Place of birth: Cannock, England
- Height: 5 ft 7 in (1.70 m)
- Position: Midfielder

Youth career
- 1981–1983: Aston Villa

Senior career*
Years	Team	Apps	(Gls)
1983–1988	Aston Villa	44	(2)
1988–1991	Notts County	27	(1)
1990–1991	→Rochdale (loan)	9	(0)
1991	→Hull City (loan)	15	(0)
1991–1994	Hull City	134	(5)
1994–1996	Northampton Town	82	(0)
1996–1998	Hereford United	43	(1)
1998–1999	Cheltenham Town	49	(3)
1999	Yeovil Town	11	(2)
1999–2001	Forest Green Rovers	43	(2)
2001	Tamworth	?	(?)
2001–2002	Gainsborough Trinity	2	(?)

International career
1983	England Youth	5	(1)

Managerial career
- 2000–2001: Forest Green Rovers
- 2001–2002: Gainsborough Trinity
- 2002–2004: Tamworth (assistant)
- 2004: Grantham Town
- * Club domestic league appearances and goals

David Wayne Norton (born 3 March 1965) is a former professional footballer who played as a midfielder.

Norton's career started at Aston Villa, where he began as an apprentice on leaving school in the summer of 1981, turning professional two years later and making his First Division debut in a 3–0 away win over Coventry City on 19 January 1985, a few weeks before his 20th birthday. He made 20 league appearances in both the 1985–86 and 1986–87 seasons, but endured the disappointment of Villa's relegation in 1987 and made just two appearances the following season as they were promoted. His final appearance was under Graham Taylor in a 2-1 home defeat against Oldham on 4 April 1988. He did not form part of Villa's return to the First Division, as he was transferred to Third Division Notts County.

He helped the Magpies reach the First Division in 1991 following back-to-back promotions (both via the playoffs) but once again he dropped down two divisions, this time signing for a Hull City side who had just fallen into the Third Division.

He spent three years at Boothferry Park before beginning a two-year spell in the league's lowest division with Northampton Town in 1994. He signed for Hereford United in 1996, but had to endure the disappointment of relegation from the Football League the following year and he retired soon afterwards due to injury.

After surgery David was able to play again at non-league level and after leaving Hereford United signed for Cheltenham Town helping them win the Football Conference but because he had taken an insurance payout on his injury he was not able to play when the club were promoted to the Football League. He moved on firstly to Yeovil Town and then to Forest Green Rovers where he became joint-manager alongside former England international Nigel Spink. He helped lead Forest Green to the 2001 FA Trophy final where they lost to Canvey Island at Villa Park. He had further spells at Tamworth and finally Gainsborough Trinity.

His brother Trace Norton also played for Aston Villa youth team before later playing for Exmouth Town and later becoming an accountant.
