= 1985–86 Aston Villa F.C. season =

English football club season

Aston Villa
1985–86 season
- Chairman: Doug Ellis
- Manager: Graham Turner
- Stadium: Villa Park
- First Division: 16th
- FA Cup: Fourth round
- League Cup: Semi-finals

Second City Derby
- 40--31--26

The 1985–86 English football season was Aston Villa's 87th season in the Football League. Villa competed in the Football League First Division.

== First Division ==
Pos	Team	Pld	W	D	L	GF	GA	GD	Pts	Qualification or relegation
14	Southampton	42	12	10	20	51	62	−11	46	
15	Manchester City	42	11	12	19	43	57	−14	45	
16	Aston Villa	42	10	14	18	51	67	−16	44	
17	Coventry City	42	11	10	21	48	71	−23	43	
18	Oxford United (Note: Oxford United would have qualified as League Cup winners.)	42	10	12	20	62	80	−18	42	Disqualified from the UEFA Cup

Source: World Football
Rules for classification: 1) Points; 2) Goal difference; 3) Goals scored
Notes:

17 August 1985	Manchester United	4–0	Aston Villa	Manchester
		Report		Stadium: Old Trafford
Note: The Football League season begins. FA Cup holders Manchester United beat Aston Villa 4–0 at Old Trafford. The season begins without any live coverage of matches on TV for an indefinite period after the collapse of talks between ITV and the Football League to show live matches this season.

21 August 1985	Aston Villa	2–2	Liverpool	Birmingham
	Gary Shaw, Mark Walters	Report		Stadium: Villa Park

24 August 1985	Aston Villa	1–2	Queens Park Rangers	Birmingham
	Mark Walters	Report		Stadium: Villa Park

27 August 1985	Southampton	0–0	Aston Villa	Southampton
		Report		Stadium: The Dell

31 August 1985	Aston Villa	3–1	Luton Town	Birmingham
	Mark Walters, Steve Hodge, David Norton	Report		Stadium: Villa Park

4 September 1985	West Bromwich Albion	0–3	Aston Villa	West Bromwich
		Report	Allan Evans (pen), Tony Daley, Mark Walters	Stadium: The Hawthorns
Note: Midweek clashes in the First Division see a 3–0 away win for Villa over local rivals West Bromwich Albion.

7 September 1985	Birmingham City	0–0	Aston Villa	Birmingham
		Report		Stadium: St Andrew's

14 September 1985	Aston Villa	1–1	Coventry City	Birmingham
	Steve Hodge	Report		Stadium: Villa Park

21 September 1985	Ipswich Town	0–3	Aston Villa	Ipswich
		Report	Mark Walters, Steve Hodge, Paul Birch	Stadium: Portman Road

28 September 1985	Aston Villa	0–0	Everton	Birmingham
		Report		Stadium: Villa Park

5 October 1985	Arsenal	3–2	Aston Villa	London
		Report	Simon Stainrod, Mark Walters	Stadium: Highbury

12 October 1985	Aston Villa	1–2	Nottingham Forest	Birmingham
	Colin Gibson	Report		Stadium: Villa Park

19 October 1985	West Ham United	4–1	Aston Villa	London
		Report	Simon Stainrod	Stadium: Boleyn Ground
Note: The First Division scene produces a string of thrilling matches. West Ham's climb up the table continues with a 4–1 home win over Villa. West Bromwich Albion finally win a league game at the 13th attempt by beating their local rivals Birmingham City 2–1 at The Hawthorns.

26 October 1985	Aston Villa	1–2	Newcastle United	Birmingham
	Andy Gray	Report		Stadium: Villa Park

2 November 1985	Aston Villa	2–0	Oxford United	Birmingham
	Allan Evans (pen), Simon Stainrod	Report		Stadium: Villa Park

9 November 1985	Watford	1–1	Aston Villa	Watford
		Report	Andy Gray	Stadium: Vicarage Road

16 November 1985	Aston Villa	1–1	Sheffield Wednesday	Birmingham
	Colin Gibson	Report		Stadium: Villa Park

23 November 1985	Chelsea	2–1	Aston Villa	London
		Report	Andy Gray	Stadium: Stamford Bridge

30 November 1985	Aston Villa	1–2	Spurs	Birmingham
	Mark Walters 88'	Report		Stadium: Villa Park

7 December 1985	Liverpool	3–0	Aston Villa	Liverpool
		Report		Stadium: Anfield
Note: Kenny Dalglish's team beat Aston Villa 3–0 at Anfield.

14 December 1985	Aston Villa	1–3	Manchester United	Birmingham
	Steve Hodge 29'	Report		Stadium: Villa Park
Note: Manchester United move five points ahead at the top of the First Division with a 3–1 win at struggling Aston Villa, who are in danger of relegation four seasons after winning the European Cup and five years after being league champions.

17 December 1985	QPR	0–1	Aston Villa	London
		Report	Paul Birch 5'	Stadium: Loftus Road

26 December 1985	Leicester City	3–1	Aston Villa	Leicester
		Report	Mark Walters 32'	Stadium: Filbert Street

28 December 1985	Aston Villa	1–1	West Bromwich Albion	Birmingham
	Paul Kerr 43'	Report		Stadium: Villa Park
Note: A local derby at Villa Park sees Aston Villa and West Bromwich Albion draw 1–1.

1 January 1986	Aston Villa	0–1	Manchester City	Birmingham
		Report		Stadium: Villa Park

11 January 1986	Coventry City	3–3	Aston Villa	Coventry
		Report	Simon Stainrod 2', Andy Gray 61', Paul Elliott 79'	Stadium: Highfield Road

18 January 1986	Luton Town	2–0	Aston Villa	Luton
		Report		Stadium: Kenilworth Road

1 February 1986	Aston Villa	0–0	Southampton	Birmingham
		Report		Stadium: Villa Park

1 March 1986	Everton	2–0	Aston Villa	Liverpool
		Report		Stadium: Goodison Park
Note: Aston Villa have slipped into the relegation zone alongside West Midlands rivals West Bromwich Albion and Birmingham City. Everton strengthen their hold on the top position in the First Division by beating Aston Villa 2–0 at home.

8 March 1986	Aston Villa	1–4	Arsenal	Birmingham
	Mark Walters 49'	Report		Stadium: Villa Park
Note: On the league scene, Aston Villa remain in the relegation zone after losing 4–1 at home to Arsenal.

15 March 1986	Forest	1–1	Aston Villa	Nottingham
		Report	Mark Walte	Stadium: City Ground

19 March 1986	Aston Villa	2–1	West Ham United	Birmingham
	Steve Hodge (2)	Report		Stadium: Villa Park

22 March 1986	Aston Villa	0–3	Birmingham City	Birmingham
	—	Report		Stadium: Villa Park
Note: A relegation crunch clash at Villa Park sees Birmingham City boost their own survival hopes and dent those of their local rivals Villa.

29 March 1986	Manchester City	2–2	Aston Villa	Manchester
		Report	Steve Hodge, Simon Stainrod	Stadium: Maine Road

31 March 1986	Aston Villa	1–0	Leicester City	Birmingham
	Simon Stainrod	Report		Stadium: Villa Park

5 April 1986	Oxford United	1–1	Aston Villa	Oxford
		Report	Simon Stainrod	Stadium: Manor Ground

9 April 1986	Newcastle United	2–2	Aston Villa	Newcastle upon Tyne
		Report	Tony Daley, Steve Hunt	Stadium: St James' Park

12 April 1986	Aston Villa	4–1	Watford	Birmingham
	Tony Dorigo, Allan Evans (pen), Andy Gray, Simon Stainrod	Report		Stadium: Villa Park
Note: Aston Villa climb out of the bottom three with a 4–1 home win over Watford.

16 April 1986	Aston Villa	1–0	Ipswich Town	Birmingham
	Steve Hodge	Report		Stadium: Villa Park
Note: In a scrap to stay clear of the relegation zone at Villa Park, Aston Villa beat Ipswich Town 1–0. Birmingham City lose 2–0 at Tottenham and now need to win all three of their remaining games to stand any chance of avoiding relegation.

19 April 1986	Sheffield Wednesday	2–0	Aston Villa	Sheffield
		Report	—	Stadium: Hillsborough Stadium

26 April 1986	Aston Villa	3–1	Chelsea	Birmingham
	David Norton, Steve Hunt, Simon Stainrod	Report		Stadium: Villa Park
Note:

3 May 1986	Tottenham Hotspur	4–2	Aston Villa	London
		Report	Simon Stainrod, Paul Elliott	Stadium: White Hart Lane
Note: Wolverhampton Wanderers become the third West Midlands club to be relegated this season, and become only the second English league club ever to suffer three successive relegations, after their descent into the Fourth Division is confirmed. Liverpool defender Gary Gillespie scores a hat-trick in a 5–0 league win over relegated Birmingham City at Anfield. Chelsea's title challenge is over after they lose 3–1 at Aston Villa, whose victory takes them closer to survival. The First Division relegation battle takes a dramatic turn when Ipswich Town climb three places clear of the drop zone with a 3–2 win over Oxford United, who are still in the bottom three.

Source: avfchistory.co.uk

== FA Cup ==
29 January 1986 – The FA Cup fourth round replays sees Millwall beat Aston Villa 1–0.

== League Cup ==
Second round 1st leg	Exeter City	1–4	Aston Villa	St James' Park
		Report	Simon Stainrod (4)
Note: Having arrived from Sheffield Wednesday for £350,000, Simon Stainrod enjoyed a spectacular debut when he scored all four goals against Exeter City in the League Cup.

8 October 1985 Second round 2nd leg	Aston Villa	8–1	Exeter City	Villa Park
		Report
Note: A Football League Cup second round second leg scoring spree at sees Aston Villa defeat Exeter City 8–1 to make the aggregate score 12–2 over two legs.

30 October 1985 Third round	Leeds United	0–3	Aston Villa	Elland Road
		Report	Walters 15', Stainrod 63', 71'
Note: All 32 winners from round two took part over a single leg. Villa's black wingers, Tony Daley and Mark Walters suffered racial abuse from elements of the Leeds crowd. FA Chairman Bert Millichip threatened to close Elland Road if the behaviour was repeated and Leeds Chairman, Leslie Silver, sent a letter of apology to the players and Club. Villa: Spink, Williams, Dorigo, Evans (c), Glover, Daley, Stainrod, Gray, Hodge, Walters

26 November 1985 – League Cup fourth round action sees Aston Villa win 2–1 away to local rivals West Bromwich Albion.

12 February 1986 – The first legs of the League Cup semi-finals are played. Aston Villa draw 2–2 at home with Oxford United while Liverpool suffer a 1–0 defeat at QPR.

12 March 1986 – Oxford United reach the League Cup final for the first time after defeating Aston Villa 4–3 on aggregate.

== Players ==
There were debuts for Simon Stainrod (63), Paul Elliott (57) and Steve Hodge (53).

10 July 1985 – Everton sell striker Andy Gray to Aston Villa for £150,000, six years after he first left Villa Park to sign for Wolves. The departure of Gray from Goodison Park comes despite calls from fans for manager Howard Kendall to retain the striker who played a crucial role in Everton winning three major trophies in his two seasons at the club.

29 November 1985 – Manchester United sign Aston Villa midfielder Colin Gibson for £275,000.

26 March 1986 – The return leg of the under-21 European Championship quarter-final sees England reach the next stage by drawing 1–1 with Denmark at Maine Road, with Aston Villa defender Paul Elliott equalising after the Danes took a 1–0 lead in the first half.
