= Gavin Oliver =

English footballer

- Oliver playing for Bradford City.

Personal information
- Full name: Gavin Ronald Oliver
- Date of birth: 6 September 1962 (age 64)
- Place of birth: Felling, England
- Height: 5 ft 11 in (1.80 m)
- Position: Central defender

Youth career
- 1979–1980: Sheffield Wednesday

Senior career*
Years	Team	Apps	(Gls)
1980–1985	Sheffield Wednesday	20	(0)
1983	→ Tranmere Rovers (loan)	17	(1)
1985	→ Brighton & Hove Albion (loan)	16	(0)
1985–1995	Bradford City	313	(9)
Total		366	(10)
- * Club domestic league appearances and goals

Gavin Ronald Oliver (born 6 September 1962) is an English former professional footballer who made more than 350 Football League appearances playing as a central defender.

== Career ==
Oliver played for Sheffield Wednesday, Tranmere Rovers, Brighton & Hove Albion and Bradford City.

He began his career as a centre forward but switched to playing as a central defender following an injury to a player in that position in a youth match. He joined Sheffield Wednesday's groundstaff in July 1979, and turned professional in August 1980. After loan spells at Tranmere Rovers and Brighton & Hove Albion he signed for Bradford City for £20,000 in November 1985.

After retiring as a player, in November 2007 he was working as Sunderland's recruitment officer.
