= Trofeo Cidade de Vigo =

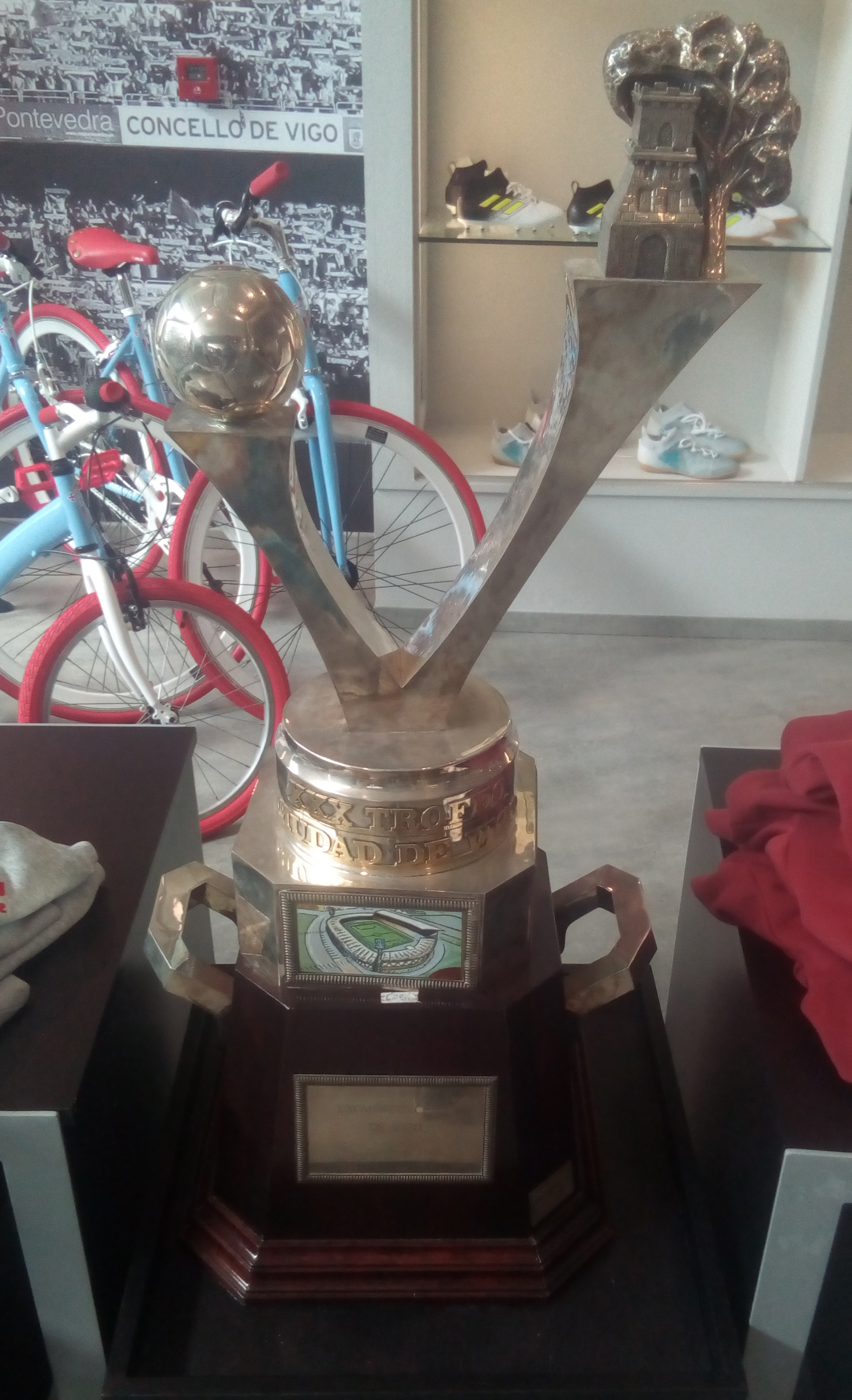
- Organiser(s): Vigo City Council
- Founded: 1971
- Abolished: 2012
- Last champions: (Spain) Celta Vigo (21st title)
- Most championships: (Spain) Celta Vigo (21 titles)

The Trofeo Cidade de Vigo (English: The City of Vigo Trophy) was an annual pre-season football tournament, established in 1971 and hosted by the Vigo City Council. Celta Vigo is the most successful team with 21 titles.

== Tournaments ==
Edition	Year	Winner	Other participating club(s)
1	1971	Panathinaikos	Celta Vigo, Pontevedra
2	1972	Celta Vigo	Vasas SC, Nacional
3	1973	Celta Vigo	Chelsea, Ourense
4	1974	Honvéd	Celta Vigo, 1. FC Köln
5	1975	Celta Vigo	Levski Spartak, Rosario Central
6	1976	Celta Vigo	Benfica, Deportivo La Coruña
7	1977	Atlético Mineiro	Celta Vigo, Torpedo Moscow, Sporting CP
8	1978	Cruzeiro	Celta Vigo, Nottingham Forest, Porto
9	1979	Athletic Bilbao	Celta Vigo, Botafogo, Ferencvárosi
10	1980	Celta Vigo	Barcelona, CSKA Sofia, Atlético Mineiro
11	1981	Real Madrid	Celta Vigo, Sporting Gijón
12	1982	Real Madrid	Celta Vigo, Sporting Gijón, Hajduk Split
13	1983	Southampton	Celta Vigo, Dinamo București
14	1984	Celta Vigo	Real Betis, Videoton, Peñarol
15	1985	Dynamo Kyiv	Celta Vigo, Real Valladolid
16	1986	Celta Vigo	Real Valladolid, Fluminense FC
17	1987	Internacional	Celta Vigo, Morocco
18	1988	Celta Vigo	Botafogo, Boca Juniors
19	1989	Benfica	Celta Vigo, Atlético Madrid
20	1990	Spartak Moscow	Celta Vigo, Sevilla
21	1991	Celta Vigo	SD Compostela
22	1992	Celta Vigo	Real Madrid
23	1993	Celta Vigo	Vasco da Gama
24	1994	Independiente Medellín	Celta Vigo
25	1995	Sevilla	Celta Vigo
26	1996	Internazionale	Celta Vigo, Deportivo La Coruña
27	1997	Celta Vigo	Lazio
28	1998	Celta Vigo	Fiorentina
29	1999	Celta Vigo	Perugia
30	2000	Celta Vigo	Porto
31	2001	Sporting CP	Celta Vigo
32	2002	Celta Vigo	Paris Saint-Germain
33	2003	Sevilla	Celta Vigo
34	2004	Vitória de Guimarães	Celta Vigo
35	2005	Celta Vigo	Real Zaragoza
36	2006	Celta Vigo	Boavista
37	2007	Atlético Madrid	Celta Vigo
38	2008	Celta Vigo	Sparta Rotterdam
39	2009	Celta Vigo	Sporting Gijón
40	2010	Real Zaragoza	Celta Vigo
41	2011	Sporting Gijón	Celta Vigo
42	2012	Celta Vigo	Atlético Madrid

== Performance by team ==
Team	Winners	Winning years
(Spain) Celta Vigo	21	1972, 1973, 1975, 1976, 1980, 1984, 1986, 1988, 1991, 1992, 1993, 1997, 1998, 1999, 2000, 2002, 2005, 2006, 2008, 2009, 2012
(Spain) Real Madrid	2	1981, 1982
(Spain) Sevilla	2	1995, 2003
(Greece) Panathinaikos	1	1971
(Hungary) Honvéd	1	1974
(Brazil) Atlético Mineiro	1	1977
(Brazil) Cruzeiro	1	1978
(Spain) Athletic Bilbao	1	1979
(England) Southampton	1	1983
(Soviet Union) Dynamo Kyiv	1	1985
(Brazil) Internacional	1	1987
(Portugal) Benfica	1	1989
(Soviet Union) Spartak Moscow	1	1990
(Colombia) Independiente Medellín	1	1994
(Italy) Internazionale	1	1996
(Portugal) Sporting CP	1	2001
(Portugal) Vitória de Guimarães	1	2004
(Spain) Atlético Madrid	1	2007
(Spain) Real Zaragoza	1	2010
(Spain) Sporting Gijón	1	2011
