= Steve Moran =

English footballer (born 1961)

Personal information
- Full name: Stephen James Moran
- Date of birth: 10 January 1961 (age 65)
- Place of birth: Croydon, England
- Position: Striker

Youth career
- 1975–1979: Southampton

Senior career*
Years	Team	Apps	(Gls)
1979–1986	Southampton	180	(78)
1986–1987	Leicester City	43	(14)
1987–1991	Reading	116	(30)
1991–1993	Exeter City	57	(27)
1993–1995	Hull City	17	(5)
Total		413	(154)

International career
1981–1984	England U21	2	(0)
- * Club domestic league appearances and goals

Stephen James Moran (born 10 January 1961) is an English former professional footballer who played as a striker for Southampton during the 1980s.

== Career ==
Moran attended Price's School in Fareham and appeared for his school team, where he was spotted by scouts. He signed for Southampton in August 1979.

In the 1980–81 season, Moran scored 18 goals in 31 starts in the league, and in 1982 he was voted PFA Young Player of the Year.

Moran scored a hat-trick in an 8–2 victory over Coventry City at The Dell in April 1984. In the same year, Moran scored an injury-time winner in the 4th round of the FA Cup, away to arch rivals Portsmouth.

Moran made 217 appearances for Southampton, including playing for them in the UEFA Cup. He was also capped for the England under-21 team. However, he suffered from a recurring back injury and never represented England at senior level.

In 1986–87 he joined Leicester City for a transfer fee of £300,000, and made his debut in a 2–2 away draw against Sheffield Wednesday in September 1986. During the following season he moved to Reading. For the 1991–92 season he moved on to Exeter City and after 57 senior appearances he transferred to Hull City for 1993–94.

== Post-football career ==
Since retiring from football, Moran has worked for an internet company and as a lorry driver for David Watson Transport Ltd, based in Yorkshire.
