= Alistair Sperring =

English footballer

Personal information
- Date of birth: 26 October 1963 (age 63)
- Place of birth: Hayling Island, England
- Height: 6 ft 2 in (1.88 m)
- Position: Goalkeeper

Youth career
- 1980–1983: Southampton

Senior career*
Years	Team	Apps	(Gls)
1983–1984	Southampton	0	(0)
1984	→ Swindon Town (loan)	0	(0)
1986	Bognor Regis Town		
- Hayling United
- * Club domestic league appearances and goals

Alistair Sperring (born 26 October 1963) is an English retired professional footballer who played as a goalkeeper. Born on Hayling Island, Sperring began his career with Southampton in 1983, and later played for Swindon Town, Bognor Regis Town and Hayling United.

== Career ==
Alistair Sperring initially joined the Southampton F.C. Academy as an apprentice in July 1980 at the age of 16, before signing professional terms in August 1983. He made his first and only appearance for the club on 8 November 1983 in the third round of the League Cup against Rotherham United, which the Saints lost 2–1. During the game, the goalkeeper missed the ball with a punch and collided with teammate Mark Wright, who had to be substituted off due to a broken nose.

After a brief loan spell with Swindon Town between August and September 1984, Sperring left Southampton. He completed a trial for Reading in January 1985, and later joined Bognor Regis Town in September 1985. The goalkeeper returned to Hayling Island in 1987 to end his playing career with Hayling United. After retiring from football, Sperring entered the motor industry and eventually became the managing director of Havant Motor Factors, a spare parts specialist.

== Bibliography ==
- Chalk, Gary; Holley, Duncan; Bull, David (2013), All the Saints: A Complete Players' Who's Who of Southampton FC, Hagiology Publishing, ISBN 978-0992686406
- Holley, Duncan; Chalk, Gary; Bull, David (2003), In That Number: A Post-War Chronicle of Southampton FC, Hagiology Publishing, ISBN 978-0953447435
