= Bridgemary School =

Location
- Wych Lane; Gosport, Hampshire, PO13 0JN; England; 50°49′23″N 1°10′30″W

Information
- Type: Academy
- Local authority: Hampshire County Council
- Trust: The Kemnal Academies Trust
- Department for Education URN: 138437 Tables
- Ofsted: Reports
- Head teacher: Tom Garfield
- Gender: Mixed
- Age range: 11–16
- Enrolment: 570
- Capacity: 1,200
- Website: www.bridgemary-tkat.org

Bridgemary School is an 11-16 secondary school with academy status in Gosport, Hampshire, England.

Bridgemary School takes part of its cohort from the most deprived ward in Gosport. However, it has always been categorised as a failing school by Ofsted. In 2001, staff were given a DfES (Department for Education and Skills) bonus for significant improvement, of more than 7%, in the GCSE A*-C pass rate. Results continued to rise, until a fall of 4% in 2004 brought it back to 25% (DfES, 2004). This was despite Ofsted's assertion in July 2004, that: 'Results in 2003 were in line with those in similar schools at the end of Year 9, and above average for similar schools at the end of Year 11'. (Ofsted Report, 2004. pg.8) The school was also identified by DfES as being among 148 nationwide which were likely to have a "high number of persistent truants". It is perhaps to the credit of staff and external agencies, working with the community, that unauthorised absence remained as low as 3.5% during this time.(Dfes, 2004.ibid)

The former principal, Richard Carlyle, introduced some ability-centred no-age-related classes (with year groups: E1, E2, E3, L1 and L2), and by 2006 the GCSE A to C pass rate had risen to 35%.

In September 2006 it was announced that Bridgemary College was to be the first school in the country to offer teaching around the clock with teaching and extra-curricular activities taking place from 7am to 10pm and learning modules being available online at any time. The scheme was to be phased in over four years, beginning in September 2007. In the first and second stages, the school planned to ensure that teaching support was available 24 hours a day and in four different time slots for four different groups of students. Stage three would see teaching expanded to 364 days a year, while stage four envisages community users integrated into the pupils' school experience.
