= David Puckett =

English footballer (born 1960)

Personal information
- Full name: David Charles Puckett
- Date of birth: 29 October 1960 (age 66)
- Place of birth: Southampton, England
- Height: 5 ft 7 in (1.70 m)
- Position: Forward

Youth career
- 1977–1978: Southampton

Senior career*
Years	Team	Apps	(Gls)
1978–1986	Southampton	94	(14)
1986–1989	Bournemouth	35	(14)
1987–1988	→ Stoke City (loan)	7	(0)
1988–1989	→ Swansea City (loan)	8	(3)
1989–1991	Aldershot	113	(50)
1991–1992	Bournemouth	4	(0)
1993–1994	Woking	25	(5)
1997–1998	Salisbury City		(3)
2011	Lymington Town	6	(1)
2013–2014	Totton & Eling	15	(1)
Total		282	(91)
- * Club domestic league appearances and goals

David Charles Puckett (born 29 October 1960) is an English former professional footballer who played in The Football League for Aldershot, Bournemouth, Southampton, and Stoke City.

== Playing career ==
Puckett began his career with Southampton during the 1970s and played nearly 100 games for them in the First Division between 1978 and 1986, scoring 14 times. However, he struggled to hold down a first team place and was transferred to Third Division side Bournemouth in 1986, helping them win that division's title and promotion to the Second Division a year later. During his time at Bournemouth he played on loan for Stoke City and Swansea City.

Puckett suffered a major knee injury while playing for the Dean Court side and was loaned to Aldershot in the 1988–89 season, scoring a hat-trick on his Third Division debut for the club, and was soon signed on a permanent basis, but was unable to save the Shots from relegation.

He made a total of 113 appearances for Aldershot in the league, scoring 50 goals, before returning to Bournemouth during the 1991–92 season, a few weeks before Aldershot went out of business and left the Football League.

The return to Bournemouth was Puckett's final contribution to senior football, as he made just four appearances for the club before hanging up his boots in professional football during 1992. He subsequently played for several non-league clubs in the south of England, including Salisbury City.

In 2011 Puckett signed for Wessex League club Lymington Town and on 26 November 2011 scored to become the league's oldest ever goalscorer at the age of 51. He later broke this record while playing for Totton & Eling when scoring at the age of 53 in February 2014. He made fifteen league appearances for Totton & Eling, scoring one goal.

On 21 May 2014 Puckett played a 4th division game in Iceland for Hvíti Riddarinn (The White Knights). Puckett was substituted in to the game in the 66th minute along with his son Bill who is one of two coaches of the team. The Knights won the game 2–0.

== Coaching career ==
In July 2003, Puckett returned to Southampton as coach to the Saints academy, working with seven to 12-year-olds. In 2009, he was the Assistant Academy Manager, working with 12- to 16-year-olds.

== Career statistics ==
Appearances and goals by club, season and competition
Club	Season	League			FA Cup		League Cup		Other^{[A]}		Total	
Club	Season	Division	Apps	Goals	Apps	Goals	Apps	Goals	Apps	Goals	Apps	Goals
Southampton	1980–81	First Division	7	0	0	0	0	0	0	0	7	0
Southampton	1981–82	First Division	17	3	0	0	1	0	0	0	18	3
Southampton	1982–83	First Division	24	3	0	0	3	1	0	0	27	4
Southampton	1983–84	First Division	18	3	0	0	0	0	0	0	18	3
Southampton	1984–85	First Division	13	1	1	0	3	0	0	0	17	1
Southampton	1985–86	First Division	15	4	2	0	5	1	2	0	24	5
Southampton	Total		94	14	3	0	12	2	2	0	111	16
Bournemouth	1986–87	Third Division	19	10	2	3	2	0	1	3	24	15
Bournemouth	1987–88	Second Division	12	4	1	0	1	0	1	0	15	4
Bournemouth	1988–89	Second Division	4	0	0	0	1	0	0	0	5	0
Bournemouth	Total		35	14	3	3	4	0	2	3	44	20
Stoke City (loan)	1987–88	Second Division	7	0	0	0	0	0	0	0	7	0
Swansea City (loan)	1988–89	Third Division	8	3	0	0	0	0	2	0	10	3
Aldershot	1988–89	Third Division	21	11	0	0	0	0	0	0	21	11
Aldershot	1989–90	Fourth Division	46	18	1	0	4	3	3	1	54	22
Aldershot	1990–91	Fourth Division	46	21	4	2	2	3	3	0	55	26
Aldershot	Total		113	50	5	2	6	6	6	1	130	59
Bournemouth	1991–92	Third Division	4	0	0	0	0	0	0	0	4	0
Career Total			261	81	11	5	22	8	12	4	306	98

A. The "Other" column constitutes appearances and goals in the Football League Trophy, Full Members Cup and Screen Sport Super Cup.

== Honours ==
Bournemouth

- Football League Third Division: 1986–87

Woking

- FA Trophy: 1993–94
