= Mark Dennis (footballer) =

English footballer (born 1961)

Personal information
- Full name: Mark Earl Dennis
- Date of birth: 2 May 1961 (age 65)
- Place of birth: Streatham, Greater London
- Height: 5 ft 9 in (1.75 m)
- Position: Left-back

Youth career
- Chelsea
- 1977–1978: Birmingham City

Senior career*
Years	Team	Apps	(Gls)
1978–1983	Birmingham City	130	(1)
1983–1987	Southampton	95	(2)
1987–1988	Queens Park Rangers	28	(0)
1989–1990	Crystal Palace	9	(0)

International career
1979	England Youth	8	(0)
1979–1980	England U21	3	(0)

Managerial career
- 2002–2003: Fleet Town
- * Club domestic league appearances and goals

Mark Earl Dennis (born 2 May 1961) is an English former professional footballer who played at left-back for Birmingham City, Southampton, Queens Park Rangers and Crystal Palace. He was capped three times for England under-21s.

Dennis was born in Streatham, London. As a player, he was a First Division runner-up with Southampton in 1983–84, and won promotion from the Second Division in 1979–80 with Birmingham City. He was their Player of the Year the previous season. His "no nonsense attitude and tough tackling" earned him the nickname Psycho, long before this was given to Stuart Pearce; Dennis was sent off 12 times in his career.

He became manager of Fleet Town in September 2002 alongside Adrian Aymes, but left the club at the end of the 2002–03 season.

He spent time as assistant manager at Eastleigh, was a presenter on 107.8 Radio Hampshire, and acted as director of football at Winchester City.
