= David Armstrong (footballer, born 1954) =

English footballer (1954–2022)

Personal information
- Full name: David Armstrong
- Date of birth: 26 December 1954
- Place of birth: Durham, England
- Date of death: 21 August 2022 (aged 67)
- Height: 5 ft 8 in (1.73 m)
- Position: Attacking midfielder

Senior career*
Years	Team	Apps	(Gls)
1971–1981	Middlesbrough	359	(59)
1981–1987	Southampton	222	(59)
1987–1988	AFC Bournemouth	9	(2)
Total		590	(120)

International career
1974–1975	England U23	4	(0)
1980	England B	2	(0)
1980–1984	England	3	(0)
- * Club domestic league appearances and goals

David Armstrong (26 December 1954 – 21 August 2022) was an English footballer who played as an attacking midfielder. He spent most of his career with Middlesbrough (from 1972 to 1981), before moving to Southampton in August 1981, where he played for a further six seasons. He finished his league career with AFC Bournemouth in 1987–88.

== Football career ==
Armstrong was part of the Middlesbrough side of the 1970s managed by Jack Charlton which won the Second Division title and was a consistent Division One team for most of the decade. Towards the end of his time at Middlesbrough, he gained his first England cap. At Ayresome Park, Armstrong was noted for his remarkable durability – for many years he was ever-present in the #11 shirt, and as a testament to this was awarded a testimonial whilst aged only 25. He holds the Boro' record for most consecutive appearances with 305 consecutive league games and 358 consecutive games in all competitions between March 1972 and August 1980.

He joined Southampton in August 1981 for £600,000, then a club record, and scored 15 league goals in his first season alongside Kevin Keegan, as the Saints led the table for most of the first three months of 1982 before finishing seventh. He came close to a league title medal again in 1984, as the Saints finished runners-up to Liverpool in the league and were also semi-finalists in the FA Cup, scoring 15 league goals again. He was Southampton FC's Player of the Season in 1983–84. At Southampton, he had scored 59 league goals in six seasons.

At the end of the 1986–87 season, Armstrong dropped down a division to sign for AFC Bournemouth. With only a handful of appearances for the club, he exacerbated an ankle injury he sustained at Southampton in a tackle at Exeter City, and retired at the end of the season.

He also made three appearances for the England international team between 1980 and 1984.

== Personal life ==
From 1987 to 2011, Armstrong had six operations on his left ankle and had to rule out full-time professional coaching. He since combined a day job in office supplies with football punditry and commentary.

On 21 August 2022, Armstrong died in his sleep in Greece aged 67.

== Honours ==
Middlesbrough

- Football League Division 2: 1973–1974
- Anglo-Scottish Cup: 1975–76

Southampton

- Football League Division 1 runners-up: 1983–84
