= Ken Armstrong (footballer, born 1959) =

British footballer (1959–2022)

Personal information
- Full name: Kenneth Charles Armstrong
- Date of birth: 31 January 1959
- Place of birth: Bridgnorth, England
- Date of death: 10 July 2022 (aged 63)
- Height: 6 ft 2 in (1.88 m)
- Position: Centre half

Youth career
- Beith Juniors

Senior career*
Years	Team	Apps	(Gls)
- Beith Juniors
1977–1983	Kilmarnock	88	(3)
1983–1984	Southampton	26	(0)
1984	→ Notts County (loan)	10	(0)
1984–1986	Birmingham City (Note: Older sources list the second goal in Birmingham's match against Middlesbrough on 8 December 1984 as an own goal, while Barry Hugman's website and the English National Football Archive give it to Armstrong.)	58	(2)
1986	Walsall	0	(0)
- * Club domestic league appearances and goals

Kenneth Charles Armstrong (31 January 1959 – 10 July 2022) was an English professional footballer who played as a centre half.

== Playing career ==
Of Scottish parentage, Armstrong was born in Bridgnorth, Shropshire, while his father was working in the area. Spotted while playing for Beith Juniors, he made 88 appearances and scored three goals in the Scottish Football League playing for Kilmarnock, and made 94 appearances, scoring twice, in the English Football League playing for Southampton, Notts County and Birmingham City. He was part of the Southampton squad that finished second to Liverpool in the 1983–84 season. He signed for Walsall in February 1986 for a fee of £10,000, broke his ankle in his first training session, and nine months later, still only 27 years of age, retired from football because of the injury without ever playing for the club.

== Later life ==
After football, Armstrong held managerial positions in the NHS. He was a business manager with Monklands and Bell-shill Hospital NHS Trust from 1993 before moving in 1996 to The Freeman Group of Hospitals NHS Trust which became the Newcastle upon Tyne Hospitals NHS Foundation Trust in 1998 where he worked as a general manager, until 1999 when he moved to NHS Tayside as director of operations.

Armstrong died in the early hours of 10 July 2022, at the age of 63.

== Honours ==
Southampton

- Football League First Division runners-up: 1983–84
