= 1987–88 Southampton F.C. season =

Southampton F.C.
1987–88 season
- Chairman: Alan Woodford (until February 1988); Guy Askham (from February 1988)
- Manager: Chris Nicholl
- Stadium: The Dell
- First Division: 12th
- FA Cup: Fourth round
- League Cup: Second round
- Full Members' Cup: Third round
- Top goalscorer: League: Colin Clarke (16); All: Colin Clarke (17)
- Highest home attendance: 21,214 v Manchester; United (15 August 1987)
- Lowest home attendance: 11,890 v Chelsea (24 October 1987)
- Average home league attendance: 14,532
- Biggest win: 3–0 v Chelsea (24 October 1987); 3–0 v Oxford United (14 November 1987)
- Biggest defeat: 0–4 v Everton (3 October 1987)
Home colours	Away colours

The 1987–88 Southampton F.C. season was the club's 87th season of competitive football and their 18th in the First Division of the Football League. The season was a difficult one for the Saints, who finished in the same league position as the previous campaign (12th), and were eliminated from all other tournaments in the early stages – they only progressed to the fourth round of the FA Cup, and were eliminated from both the League Cup and the Full Members' Cup at the first hurdle.

Southampton had a busy summer transfer window in 1987. Leaving the club were several first-team starters, including two-time Player of the Season winner Peter Shilton, 15-year veteran Nick Holmes and key centre-back Mark Wright. Additions to the squad included returning midfielder Graham Baker, new first-choice goalkeeper John Burridge and left-back Derek Statham. The team struggled in the First Division throughout the campaign, picking up only a few wins now and then to ensure they kept clear of the relegation zone. 1987–88 was Southampton's last season with chairman Alan Woodford, who died in February 1988; he was succeeded by Guy Askham.

Outside the league, Southampton had a disappointing season. In the FA Cup, the club edged past Second Division strugglers Reading in the third round, before suffering elimination at the hands of top-flight rivals Luton Town in the fourth. In the League Cup, the Saints were knocked out by local Second Division side Bournemouth; and in the Full Members' Cup, they faced elimination in their opening second round match against Bradford City, another second-tier club. The 1987–88 season included the first league matches between Southampton and Portsmouth since 1976, with a 2–2 draw at Fratton Park followed by a Pompey away win later in the season.

Southampton used 20 players during the 1987–88 season and had 14 different goalscorers. Their top scorer was again Colin Clarke, who scored 16 times in the league and once in the FA Cup. Danny Wallace was second on seven goals. Clarke also made the most appearances (44), followed by Derek Statham and Glenn Cockerill on 43 each – Statham won the club's Player of the Season award at the end of the year. The average league attendance at The Dell during the campaign was 14,532. The highest attendance was 21,214 in the opening day tie against Manchester United and the lowest was 11,890 in a 3–0 win over Chelsea on 24 October 1987.

== Background and transfers ==
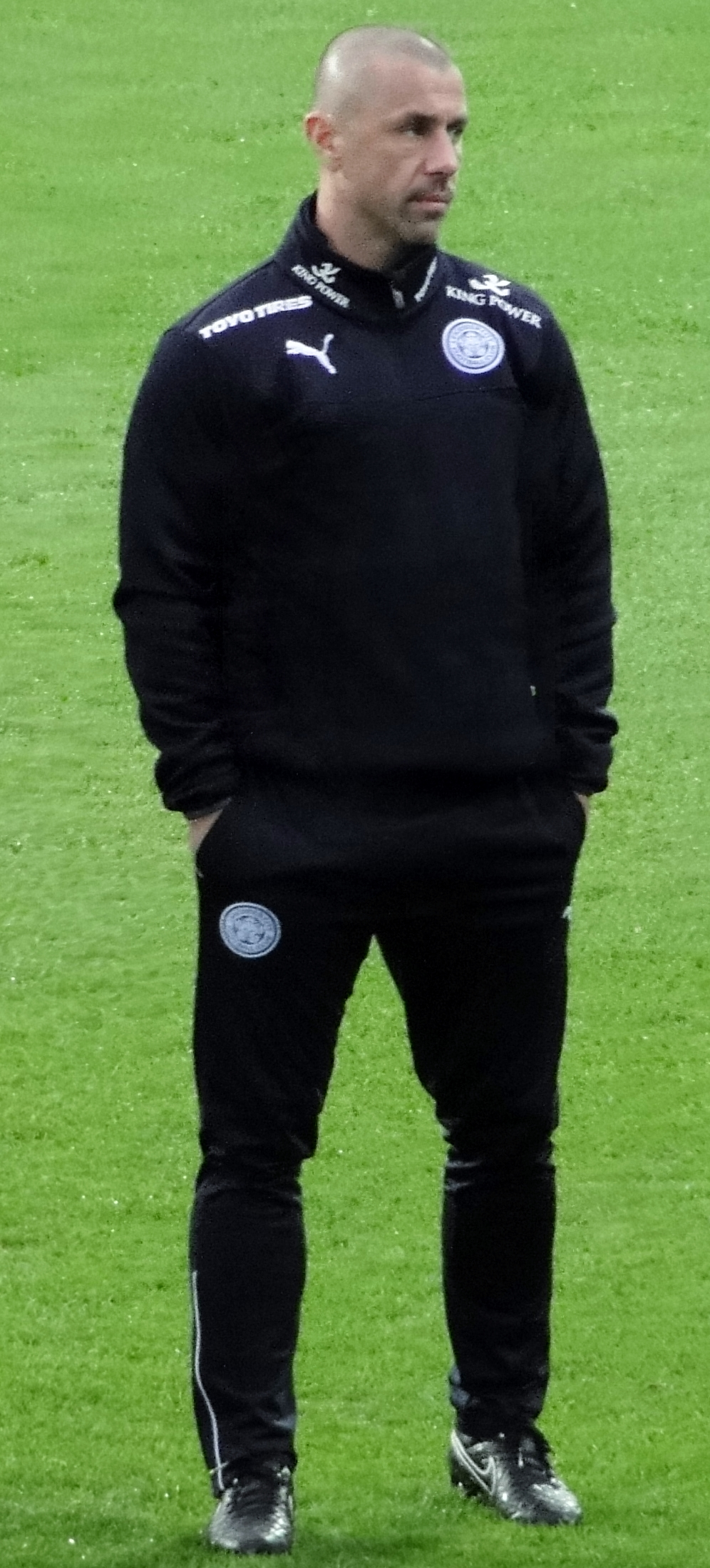
Striker Kevin Phillips signed as a youth player in 1987. He would later leave before making a first team appearance, but returned in 2003 for two years.

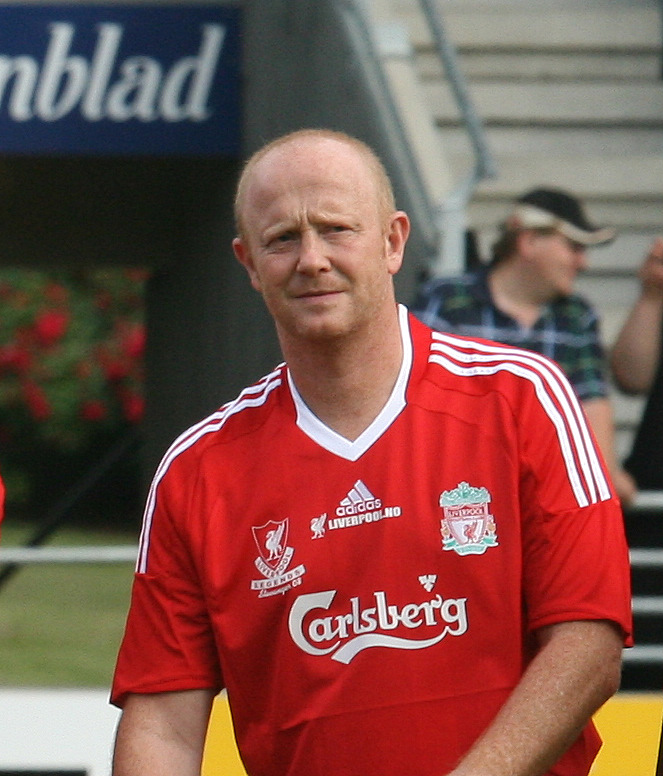
Saints sold key centre-back Mark Wright to Derby County for £750,000 in the summer of 1987, after a five-year tenure.

During the 1987 close season, Southampton faced a number of changes amidst rumours of "dressing room unrest" sparked by the public dismissal of Mark Dennis late the previous season. Following the departure of third-choice goalkeeper Phil Kite in May, who made his loan move to Third Division outfit Gillingham permanent, the Saints also lost first-choice goalkeeper and two-time Player of the Season award winner Peter Shilton, who left for Derby County following their promotion to the top flight as Second Division champions. Also released in the summer were David Armstrong, who had been a mainstay for the team for six years, but moved on a free transfer to Bournemouth for their first season in the Second Division; Jon Gittens, who had struggled to break into the Saints first team and moved on a free transfer to Swindon Town, another new arrival in the second flight; and George Lawrence, who ended his second spell at The Dell to join Millwall a division below for a fee of £160,000.

To replace the outgoing players, Chris Nicholl's Saints made a number of signings ahead of the 1987–88 campaign. First to arrive was midfielder Graham Baker, who had previously played for the South Coast side between 1977 and 1982, before spending five years with Manchester City. In July, centre-back Kevin Moore made the step up from Second Division side Oldham Athletic in a deal worth £150,000, and in August the club signed goalkeeper John Burridge from Sheffield United and left-back Derek Statham from West Bromwich Albion. The same month, centre-back Mark Wright was sold to Derby County for £750,000. Also signed in the summer were two youth players – Nicky Banger and Jeff Kenna – with striker Kevin Phillips added in October. Also in October, Saints veteran Nick Holmes left the club for a year with East Cowes Victoria Athletic, although he would later return as reserve team manager. Keith Granger moved to Darlington in March 1988, after a short emergency loan spell with the Fourth Division side.

Players transferred out

Name	Nationality	Pos.	Club	Date	Fee	Ref.
Graham Baker	England	MF	(England) Manchester City	May 1987	Free	
Nicky Banger	England	FW	(England) Bassett Comets	July 1987	Free (Note: Nicky Banger initially joined as a trainee in July 1987, before turning professional in April 1989.)	
Jeff Kenna	England	DF	(Republic of Ireland) Palmerston Rangers	July 1987	Free (Note: Jeff Kenna initially joined as a trainee in July 1987, before turning professional in April 1989.)	
Kevin Moore	England	DF	(England) Oldham Athletic	July 1987	£150,000	
John Burridge	England	GK	(England) Sheffield United	August 1987	Unknown	
Derek Statham	England	DF	(England) West Bromwich Albion	August 1987	£100,000	
Kevin Phillips	England	FW	none (free agent)	October 1987	Free (Note: Kevin Phillips initially joined as an associate schoolboy in October 1987, before signing as an apprentice in July 1989.)	
Lee Powell	Wales	FW	none (free agent)	December 1987	Free (Note: Lee Powell initially joined as an associate schoolboy in December 1987, before signing as a trainee in August 1989.)	

Players transferred out

Name	Nationality	Pos.	Club	Date	Fee	Ref.
Phil Kite	England	GK	(England) Gillingham	May 1987	Free	
Peter Shilton	England	GK	(England) Derby County	June 1987	Unknown	
David Armstrong	England	MF	(England) Bournemouth	July 1987	Free	
Jon Gittens	England	MF	(England) Swindon Town	July 1987	Free	
George Lawrence	England	MF	(England) Millwall	July 1987	£160,000	
Mark Wright	England	DF	(England) Derby County	August 1987	£750,000	
Nick Holmes	England	MF	(England) East Cowes Victoria Athletic	October 1987	Free	
Keith Granger	England	GK	(England) Darlington	March 1988	Unknown	
Phil Parkinson	England	MF	(England) Bury	March 1988	Unknown	

Players loaned out

Name	Nationality	Pos.	Club	Date from	Date to	Ref.
Tim Flowers	England	GK	(England) Swindon Town	November 1987	December 1987	
Keith Granger	England	GK	(England) Darlington	December 1987	March 1988	

== Pre-season friendlies ==
Ahead of the 1987–88 league campaign, Southampton played eight pre-season friendlies. In May, they competed in the Epson Cup in Singapore, beating Australian side Perth Azzurri 4–1, drawing 0–0 with Scottish side St Mirren, and losing 0–1 to Mexican side Universidad Autónoma. Back in the UK, the Saints beat local Southern League side Gosport Borough 1–0 thanks to new arrival Graham Baker, beat Third Division side Bristol City 4–2, beat St Mirren 2–1 and drew 1–1 with another Scottish side, Dumbarton. The last pre-season game was a 3–0 testimonial win over Bournemouth a week before the league's opening fixture.

21 May 1987 Epson Cup	Perth Azzurri	1–4	Southampton	Singapore
			Clarke; D. Wallace

23 May 1987 Epson Cup	Southampton	0–0	St Mirren	Singapore

25 May 1987 Epson Cup	Southampton	0–1	Universidad Autónoma	Singapore

27 July 1987 Friendly	Gosport Borough	0–1	Southampton	Gosport
			G. Baker	Stadium: Privett Park

29 July 1987 Friendly	Bristol City	2–4	Southampton	Bristol
			G. Baker; Bond; Clarke; Townsend	Stadium: Ashton Gate

1 August 1987 Friendly	St Mirren	1–2	Southampton	Paisley, Scotland
			G. Baker; Hobson	Stadium: Love Street

3 August 1987 Friendly	Dumbarton	1–1	Southampton	Dumbarton, Scotland
			Clarke	Stadium: Boghead Park

8 August 1987 Testimonial Match	Bournemouth	0–3	Southampton	Bournemouth
			Clarke; Hobson; D. Wallace	Stadium: Dean Court

== First Division ==
Southampton started the 1987–88 league campaign with a 2–2 draw against Manchester United (both goals scored by Danny Wallace), followed by a 1–0 away win over Norwich City, which put them in the top six of the table. The club's third game of the season was their first league meeting with local rivals Portsmouth since 1976, and their first game ever against one another in the top flight of the Football League. The game at Fratton Park ended as a 2–2 draw, with Southampton's top scorer of the previous season Colin Clarke scoring a brace for the visitors. After these first three games, the Saints picked up just two points from their next six matches, which saw them drop all the way down to 18th place in the First Division table. The spell included a disappointing 0–1 home defeat to Queens Park Rangers, who had only narrowly avoided relegation the previous season, 1–2 defeats at Tottenham Hotspur and Newcastle United, and the club's biggest defeat of the campaign, 0–4 at home to defending champions Everton.

October saw the Saints' fortunes turn around, as they won three games in a row to return to the top half of the table. First, Wallace scored the only goal of the game to help Southampton edge past Watford for their first home win of the season; second, they overcame an early two-goal deficit to win 3–2 over mid-table side Coventry City (their first win at Highfield Road since 1949); and finally, they easily beat strugglers Chelsea 3–0 at The Dell. Two more wins in mid-November kept the Hampshire side in contention for a top-half place coming towards the halfway point of the season. A 3–0 home win over Oxford United (who eventually finished bottom of the First Division) during this period was followed by a "deserved" 1–0 victory over Arsenal at their own ground, after the Gunners had won ten games in a row and established their place at the top of the table. Southampton subsequently dropped points against relegation-threatened sides Derby County and West Ham United, although they did take a point away from their home tie against Liverpool and ended the year beating Tottenham Hotspur 2–1 on Boxing Day. Come the end of 1987, the club were ninth in the table with seven wins, seven draws, seven defeats, and a goal difference of 0.

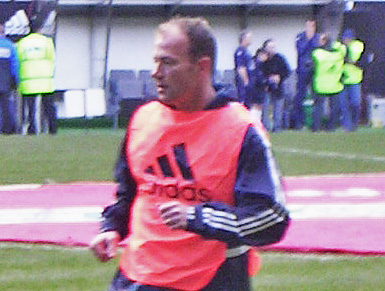
Alan Shearer made his debut for Southampton in March.

The club started 1988 poorly with two defeats against Queens Park Rangers and Portsmouth, during which they failed to score, although this was followed by a 2–0 win over Manchester United at Old Trafford. They were unable to pick up any momentum, however, and by mid-February after two more draws and a loss, they had started dropping down into the bottom half of the league table. After a 1–1 draw with Nottingham Forest on 13 February 1988, it was announced that Southampton chairman Alan Woodford had died; he was replaced in early March by Guy Askham. The club's poor home and better away record continued through March, as they won two games on the road (1–0 over both Watford and Chelsea) and lost two games at The Dell (1–2 against Coventry City and 0–1 against Charlton Athletic).

On 9 April 1988, Southampton hosted Arsenal, who were on an eight-game unbeaten run. With regular starter Danny Wallace injured, young striker Alan Shearer made his full debut for the club and scored three of the hosts' goals to secure a 4–2 win – by scoring a hat-trick on his full debut, he broke a 30-year-old record held by Jimmy Greaves for the youngest player to score a hat-trick in the top flight of English football, as well as becoming the first debutant to score three in one game since 1967 (in the Second Division). Southampton's final four games of the campaign saw them losing 0–2 to Derby County, all but securing their survival in the division; beating West Ham United 2–1; and drawing 1–1 with both Liverpool (who had just secured the championship) and Luton Town. The Saints finished 12th in the league table, the same position as the previous season.

=== List of match results ===
15 August 1987 1	Southampton	2–2	Manchester United	Southampton
	D. Wallace 29', 57'		Whiteside 26', 31'	Stadium: The Dell; Attendance: 21,214

19 August 1987 2	Norwich City	0–1	Southampton	Norwich
			Moore 61'	Stadium: Carrow Road; Attendance: 14,429

22 August 1987 3	Portsmouth	2–2	Southampton	Portsmouth
	Hilaire 21'; Whitehead 74'		Clarke 25', 48'	Stadium: Fratton Park; Attendance: 20,161

29 August 1987 4	Southampton	0–1	Queens Park Rangers	Southampton
			Brock 74'	Stadium: The Dell; Attendance: 15,532

2 September 1987 5	Nottingham Forest	3–3	Southampton	Nottingham
	Clough 5', 66'; Pearce 32'		Townsend 24'; Clarke 72' (pen.); Hobson 81'	Stadium: City Ground; Attendance: 14,173

5 September 1987 6	Southampton	1–1	Sheffield Wednesday	Southampton
	Clarke 81'		Chapman 15'	Stadium: The Dell; Attendance: 12,526

12 September 1987 7	Tottenham Hotspur	2–1	Southampton	London
	Claesen 45'; C. Allen 89' (pen.)		G. Baker 15'	Stadium: White Hart Lane; Attendance: 24,728

26 September 1987 8	Newcastle United	2–1	Southampton	Newcastle upon Tyne
	Mirandinha 61'; Goddard 75'		Clarke 65'	Stadium: St James' Park; Attendance: 18,093

3 October 1987 9	Southampton	0–4	Everton	Southampton
			Sharp 5', 17', 20', 61'	Stadium: The Dell; Attendance: 15,719

17 October 1987 10	Southampton	1–0	Watford	Southampton
	D. Wallace 68'			Stadium: The Dell; Attendance: 11,933

20 October 1987 11	Coventry City	2–3	Southampton	Coventry
	Ginn 15'; Bennett 18'		Bond 36'; G. Baker 48'; D. Wallace 76'	Stadium: Highfield Road; Attendance: 14,522

24 October 1987 12	Southampton	3–0	Chelsea	Southampton
	G. Baker 69'; Clarke 71'; D. Wallace 73'			Stadium: The Dell; Attendance: 11,890

31 October 1987 13	Charlton Athletic	1–1	Southampton	London
	Walsh 70'		D. Wallace 12'	Stadium: Selhurst Park; Attendance: 5,158

7 November 1987 14	Wimbledon	2–0	Southampton	London
	Fairweather 27'; Cork 86'			Stadium: Plough Lane; Attendance: 5,014

14 November 1987 15	Southampton	3–0	Oxford United	Southampton
	D. Wallace 31', 88'; Cockerill 63'			Stadium: The Dell; Attendance: 12,095

21 November 1987 16	Arsenal	0–1	Southampton	London
			D. Wallace 78'	Stadium: Arsenal Stadium; Attendance: 32,477

28 November 1987 17	Southampton	1–2	Derby County	Southampton
	Townsend 47'		Gee 69'; Garner 76'	Stadium: The Dell; Attendance: 15,201

5 December 1987 18	West Ham United	2–1	Southampton	London
	D. Wallace 43'		Keen 12'; Dickens 76'	Stadium: Boleyn Ground; Attendance: 15,375

12 December 1987 19	Southampton	2–2	Liverpool	Southampton
	Clarke 43'; Townsend 71'		Barnes 11', 38'	Stadium: The Dell; Attendance: 19,507

18 December 1987 20	Luton Town	2–2	Southampton	Luton
	McDonough 23'; Harford 86'		Clarke 7' (pen.), 71'	Stadium: Kenilworth Road; Attendance: 6,618

26 December 1987 21	Southampton	2–1	Tottenham Hotspur	Southampton
	Moore 25'; Clarke 30'		Fairclough 76'	Stadium: The Dell; Attendance: 18,456

1 January 1988 22	Queens Park Rangers	3–0	Southampton	London
	Bannister 69'; Falco 75'; Fereday 77'			Stadium: Loftus Road; Attendance: 8,631

3 January 1988 23	Southampton	0–2	Portsmouth	Southampton
			Connor 23'; Horne 30'	Stadium: The Dell; Attendance: 17,002

16 January 1988 24	Manchester United	0–2	Southampton	Manchester
			Clarke 7', 74'	Stadium: Old Trafford; Attendance: 35,716

23 January 1988 25	Southampton	0–0	Norwich City	Southampton
				Stadium: The Dell; Attendance: 12,002

6 February 1988 26	Sheffield Wednesday	2–1	Southampton	Sheffield
	Sterland 77'; Chapman 84'		Clarke 27' (pen.)	Stadium: Hillsborough Stadium; Attendance: 14,769

13 February 1988 27	Southampton	1–1	Nottingham Forest	Southampton
	Clarke 38' (pen.)		Clough 44'	Stadium: The Dell; Attendance: 13,315

27 February 1988 28	Everton	1–0	Southampton	Liverpool
	Power 4'			Stadium: Goodison Park; Attendance: 20,764

1 March 1988 29	Southampton	1–1	Newcastle United	Southampton
	Clarke 48'		O'Neill 85'	Stadium: The Dell; Attendance: 13,380

5 March 1988 30	Watford	0–1	Southampton	Watford
			Moore 45'	Stadium: Vicarage Road; Attendance: 11,824

12 March 1988 31	Southampton	1–2	Coventry City	Southampton
	D. Wallace 28'		Smith 65'; Kilcline 78'	Stadium: The Dell; Attendance: 12,914

19 March 1988 32	Southampton	0–1	Charlton Athletic	Southampton
			Crooks 61'	Stadium: The Dell; Attendance: 12,103

26 March 1988 33	Chelsea	0–1	Southampton	London
			G. Baker 76'	Stadium: Stamford Bridge; Attendance: 15,380

2 April 1988 34	Southampton	2–2	Wimbledon	Southampton
	G. Baker 69'; Cockerill 82'		Cunningham 40'; Gayle 88'	Stadium: The Dell; Attendance: 13,036

4 April 1988 35	Oxford United	0–0	Southampton	Oxford
				Stadium: Manor Ground; Attendance: 7,657

9 April 1988 36	Southampton	4–2	Arsenal	Southampton
	Shearer 5', 33', 49'; Blake 44'		Bond 11' (o.g.); Davis 82'	Stadium: The Dell; Attendance: 14,521

23 April 1988 37	Derby County	2–0	Southampton	Derby
	Gregory 25'; Stapleton 32'			Stadium: Baseball Ground; Attendance: 14,291

30 April 1988 38	Southampton	2–1	West Ham United	Southampton
	Bond 72', 84'		Cottee 57'	Stadium: The Dell; Attendance: 15,562

2 May 1988 39	Liverpool	1–1	Southampton	Liverpool
	Aldridge 41'		R. Wallace 67'	Stadium: Anfield; Attendance: 37,610

7 May 1988 40	Southampton	1–1	Luton Town	Southampton
	Clarke 55'		Wilson 31'	Stadium: The Dell; Attendance: 12,722

=== Final league table ===
Pos	Team	Pld	W	D	L	GF	GA	GD	Pts
10	Coventry City	40	13	14	13	46	53	−7	53
11	Sheffield Wednesday	40	15	8	17	52	66	−14	53
12	Southampton	40	12	14	14	49	53	−4	50
13	Tottenham Hotspur	40	12	11	17	38	48	−10	47
14	Norwich City	40	12	9	19	40	52	−12	45

Source: RSSSF
Rules for classification: 1) Points; 2) Goal difference; 3) Goals scored

=== Results by matchday ===
Round	1	2	3	4	5	6	7	8	9	10	11	12	13	14	15	16	17	18	19	20	21	22	23	24	25	26	27	28	29	30	31	32	33	34	35	36	37	38	39	40
Ground	H	A	A	H	A	H	A	A	H	H	A	H	A	A	H	A	H	A	H	A	H	A	H	A	H	A	H	A	H	A	H	H	A	H	A	H	A	H	A	H
Result	D	W	D	L	D	D	L	L	L	W	W	W	D	L	W	W	L	L	D	D	W	L	L	W	D	L	D	L	D	W	L	L	W	D	D	W	L	W	D	D
Position	11	6	8	10	10	10	13	17	18	17	11	10	9	11	10	9	9	10	10	10	9	12	13	11	11	12	11	12	12	10	10	14	10	14	12	10	12	11	12	12

Source: 11v11.com
A = Away; H = Home; W = Win; D = Draw; L = Loss

== FA Cup ==
Southampton entered the 1987–88 FA Cup in the third round against Second Division strugglers Reading. The first half was relatively evenly matched between the two sides, but it was the First Division visitors who struck first just before the break, when Matt Le Tissier scored his first FA Cup goal after an assist from Colin Clarke. The hosts "dominated" the second half, but were unable to respond to Southampton's opener and ultimately succumbed to a 0–1 defeat. In the fourth round, Southampton travelled to face First Division rivals Luton Town. After an uneventful first half, the break made way for a flurry of activity late on – Clarke opened the scoring in the 71st minute, before a Derek Statham own goal and a Brian Stein close-range effort within a minute of one another put an end to Southampton's hopes of progressing to the fifth round.

9 January 1988 Round 3	Reading	0–1	Southampton	Reading
			Le Tissier 43'	Stadium: Elm Park; Attendance: 11,319

30 January 1988 Round 4	Luton Town	2–1	Southampton	Luton
	Statham 83' (o.g.); B. Stein 84'		Clarke 71'	Stadium: Kenilworth Road; Attendance: 10,009

== League Cup ==
In the League Cup, Southampton faced local Second Division side Bournemouth. The first leg, at Dean Court, ended in a 1–0 victory for the hosts, and the Saints could only manage a 2–2 draw in the return leg at The Dell, meaning they were eliminated at the first hurdle in the competition.

22 September 1987 Round 2 Leg 1	Bournemouth	1–0	Southampton	Bournemouth
	Cooke 48'			Stadium: Dean Court; Attendance: 10,364

6 October 1987 Round 2 Leg 2	Southampton	2–2 (2–3 agg.)	Bournemouth	Southampton
	Le Tissier 33'; Statham 40'		Newson 31'; O'Driscoll 69'	Stadium: The Dell; Attendance: 13,429

== Full Members' Cup ==
Like in the League Cup, Southampton faced Second Division opponents in the second round of the 1987–88 Full Members' Cup, travelling to promotion hopefuls Bradford City. Despite "battling hard all the way", the top-flight side lost 0–1 to the Bantams and were eliminated from the tournament.

25 January 1988 Round 2	Bradford City	1–0	Southampton	Bradford
	Kennedy 43'			Stadium: Valley Parade; Attendance: 7,844

== Other matches ==
Southampton played four additional games during the 1987–88 season. A testimonial against Grimsby Town in November saw the top-flight side beaten 3–1 by the Third Division hosts; two friendlies in March saw Southampton and a Danish Olympic XI draw 2–2 and later beat an "all stars" team arranged by former player Steve Mills 7–3. The final friendly game of the season was a testimonial at Basingstoke Town, which the Saints won 4–0 thanks to a Danny Wallace hat-trick and a Matt Le Tissier goal.

30 November 1987 Testimonial Match	Grimsby Town	3–1	Southampton	Cleethorpes
			Clarke	Stadium: Blundell Park

8 March 1988 Friendly	Southampton	2–2	(Denmark) Danish Olympic XI	Southampton
	D. Wallace			Stadium: The Dell

28 March 1988 Friendly	Southampton	7–3	Steve Mills Saints All Stars	Southampton
	Townsend; G. Baker; Davis; Shearer; Statham; D. Wallace			Stadium: The Dell

11 May 1988 Testimonial Match	Basingstoke Town	0–4	Southampton	Basingstoke
			D. Wallace; Le Tissier	Stadium: The Camrose

== Player details ==
Southampton used 20 different players during the 1987–88 season, 14 of whom scored during the campaign. Striker Colin Clarke started 44 of the club's 45 games, missing only the Full Members' Cup fixture. He also finished as the club's top goalscorer for a second consecutive season, scoring 16 times in the league and once in the FA Cup. Derek Statham started 43 games and won the Southampton F.C. Player of the Season award in his first season at the club. Danny Wallace was the second highest scorer with seven goals, followed by newcomers Graham Baker and Rod Wallace on five goals each.

=== Squad statistics ===
Name	Pos.	Nat.	League		FA Cup		League Cup		FM Cup		Total	
Name	Pos.	Nat.	Apps.	Gls.	Apps.	Gls.	Apps.	Gls.	Apps.	Gls.	Apps.	Gls.
Graham Baker	MF	(England)	33(3)	5	2	0	0(1)	0	1	0	36(4)	5
Steve Baker	DF	(England)	4	0	0	0	0	0	0	0	4	0
Mark Blake	DF	(England)	7	1	1	0	0	0	1	0	9	1
Kevin Bond	DF	(England)	39	3	1	0	2	0	0	0	42	3
Gary Bull	FW	(England)	0	0	0	0	0	0	0	0	0	0
John Burridge	GK	(England)	31	0	2	0	0	0	1	0	34	0
Jimmy Case	MF	(England)	37(1)	1	1	0	2	0	0	0	40(1)	1
Colin Clarke	FW	(Northern Ireland)	40	16	2	1	2	0	0	0	44	17
Glenn Cockerill	MF	(England)	35(4)	2	1	0	2	0	1	0	39(4)	2
Andy Cook	DF	(England)	2	0	0	0	0	0	0	0	2	0
Steve Davis	DF	(England)	0	0	0	0	0	0	0	0	0	0
Tim Flowers	GK	(England)	9	0	0	0	2	0	0	0	11	0
Gerry Forrest	DF	(England)	37	0	2	0	2	0	1	0	42	0
Ian Hamilton	MF	(England)	0	0	0	0	0	0	0	0	0	0
Gordon Hobson	FW	(England)	12(1)	1	1	0	1	0	1	0	15(1)	1
Matt Le Tissier	MF	(England)	10(9)	0	1	1	1	1	1	0	13(9)	2
Craig Maskell	MF	(England)	0	0	0	0	0	0	0(1)	0	0(1)	0
Kevin Moore	DF	(England)	35	3	2	0	2	0	1	0	40	3
Phil Parkinson	MF	(England)	0	0	0	0	0	0	0	0	0	0
Alan Shearer	FW	(England)	3(2)	3	0	0	0	0	0	0	3(2)	3
Derek Statham	DF	(England)	38	0	2	0	2	1	1	0	43	1
Allen Tankard	DF	(England)	0	0	0	0	0	0	0	0	0	0
Andy Townsend	MF	(Republic of Ireland)	36(1)	2	2	0	2	0	1	0	41(1)	2
Danny Wallace	FW	(England)	33	7	2	0	2	0	1	0	38	7
Rod Wallace	FW	(England)	3(14)	5	0	0	0	0	0(1)	0	3(15)	5

=== Most appearances ===
Rank	Name	Pos.	League		FA Cup		League Cup		FM Cup		Total		
Rank	Name	Pos.	Starts	Subs	Starts	Subs	Starts	Subs	Starts	Subs	Starts	Subs	Total
1	Colin Clarke	FW	40	0	2	0	2	0	0	0	44	0	44
2	Derek Statham	DF	38	0	2	0	2	0	1	0	43	0	43
2	Glenn Cockerill	MF	35	4	1	0	2	0	1	0	39	4	43
4	Kevin Bond	DF	39	0	1	0	2	0	0	0	42	0	42
4	Gerry Forrest	DF	37	0	2	0	2	0	1	0	42	0	42
4	Andy Townsend	MF	36	1	2	0	2	0	1	0	41	1	42
7	Jimmy Case	MF	37	1	1	0	2	0	0	0	40	1	41
8	Kevin Moore	DF	35	0	2	0	2	0	1	0	40	0	40
8	Graham Baker	MF	33	3	2	0	0	1	1	0	36	4	40
10	Danny Wallace	FW	33	0	2	0	2	0	1	0	38	0	38

=== Top goalscorers ===
Rank	Name	Pos.	League		FA Cup		League Cup		FM Cup		Total		
Rank	Name	Pos.	Goals	Apps	Goals	Apps	Goals	Apps	Goals	Apps	Goals	Apps	GPG
1	Colin Clarke	FW	16	40	1	2	0	2	0	0	17	44	0.39
2	Danny Wallace	FW	7	33	0	2	0	2	0	1	7	38	0.18
3	Rod Wallace	FW	5	17	0	0	0	0	0	1	5	18	0.28
3	Graham Baker	MF	5	36	0	2	0	1	0	1	5	40	0.13
5	Alan Shearer	FW	3	5	0	0	0	0	0	0	3	5	0.60
5	Kevin Moore	DF	3	35	0	2	0	2	0	1	3	40	0.08
5	Kevin Bond	DF	3	39	0	1	0	2	0	0	3	42	0.07
8	Matt Le Tissier	MF	0	19	1	1	1	1	0	1	2	22	0.09
8	Andy Townsend	MF	2	37	0	2	0	2	0	1	2	42	0.05
8	Glenn Cockerill	MF	2	39	0	1	0	2	0	1	2	43	0.05

== Bibliography ==
- Holley, Duncan; Chalk, Gary (2003), Bull, David (ed.), In That Number: A Post-War Chronicle of Southampton FC, Bristol, England: Hagiology Publishing, ISBN 0-9534474-3-X
