= 1986–87 Southampton F.C. season =

Southampton F.C.
1986–87 season
- Chairman: Alan Woodford
- Manager: Chris Nicholl
- Stadium: The Dell
- First Division: 12th
- FA Cup: Third round
- League Cup: Semi-finals
- Full Members' Cup: Third round
- Top goalscorer: League: Colin Clarke (20); All: Colin Clarke (22)
- Highest home attendance: 20,452 v Liverpool (20 September 1986)
- Lowest home attendance: 4,518 v Hull City (25 November 1986)
- Average home league attendance: 14,948
- Biggest win: 5–0 v Aston Villa (21 March 1987)
- Biggest defeat: 1–5 v Manchester United (13 September 1986); 0–4 v Arsenal (15 November 1986)
Home colours	Away colours

The 1986–87 Southampton F.C. season was the club's 86th season of competitive football and their 17th in the First Division of the Football League. The second season with Chris Nicholl as manager, 1986–87 saw the Saints improve only marginally on their previous campaign, finishing 12th in the First Division table – two places higher than the year before. Outside the league, the South Coast club were knocked out of the FA Cup in the third round for the first time in four years, reached the League Cup semi-finals for the first time since 1978–79, and made it to the third round of the second annual Full Members' Cup tournament.

Southampton made two key signings in the summer of 1986, making goalkeeper Tim Flowers' loan move permanent and bringing in Northern Irish striker Colin Clarke. Nicholl also signed three trainees, including midfielder Neil Maddison and striker Alan Shearer, who would go on to be important members of the Saints squad a few years later. Leaving ahead of the 1986–87 season were fringe players Eamonn Collins, Alan Curtis, Stuart McManus, Mark Whitlock and David Puckett, while former top scorer Steve Moran left a few months later. Southampton's league performance was characterised by spells of mixed form, including a run which included just one win in eleven games over the new year period, and a nine-match unbeaten run at the end of the season. The club generally sat in the bottom half of the table throughout.

In the FA Cup, Southampton were eliminated in the third round for the first time since 1982–83, losing 1–2 to previous year's runners-up (and First Division runners-up) Everton. The club fared much better in the League Cup, reaching the semi-finals for the first time since finishing as runners-up in 1978–79. The club picked up wins over Fourth Division side Swindon Town, First Division rivals Manchester United and Aston Villa, and Second Division strugglers Shrewsbury Town en route to the semi-finals, where they lost to defending league champions Liverpool. In the Full Members' Cup – which was held in lieu of European competitions due to the banning of English sides following the Heysel Stadium disaster in 1985 – Southampton made it to the third round before being eliminated by Norwich City.

Southampton used 23 players during the 1986–87 season and had 15 different goalscorers. Their top scorer was new signing Clarke, who scored 20 times in the league and twice in the League Cup. George Lawrence was second highest with eleven goals in all competitions, followed closely by Matt Le Tissier in his debut year for the first team, who scored ten times. Glenn Cockerill was the only Saints player to feature in all 53 games during the 1986–87 season, followed by Jimmy Case and Gerry Forrest on 49 and 47 games, respectively. The average league attendance at The Dell during the campaign was 14,948 – the first time it had dipped below 15,000 since 1962. The highest attendance was 20,452 against Liverpool on 20 September 1986; the lowest was 11,508 against Coventry City on 3 February 1987.

== Background and transfers ==
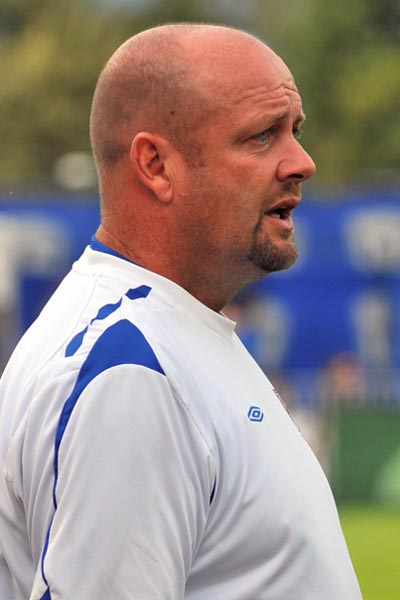
Southampton broke their transfer record with the £400,000 signing of striker Colin Clarke from Bournemouth in July 1986.

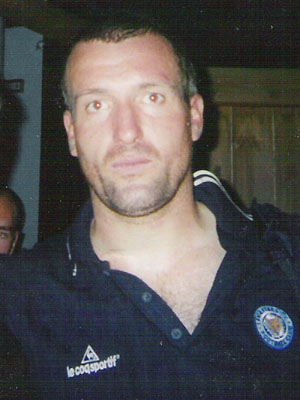
Following a successful loan spell at the end of the last season, Tim Flowers was signed on a permanent basis from Wolverhampton Wanderers.

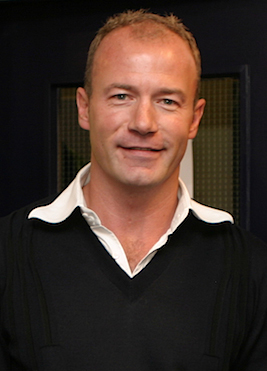
Alan Shearer was one of three trainees signed in the summer of 1986. He would make his first team debut at the end of the next season and go on to score 43 goals in 158 games.

Ahead of the 1986–87 season, Southampton made a club record signing of Colin Clarke, paying local Third Division side Bournemouth £400,000 for the Northern Irish striker. The only other first team signing in the summer was goalkeeper Tim Flowers, who was signed on a permanent basis for £70,000 after having spent the last two months of the previous season at the club on loan. In addition to Clarke and Flowers, manager Chris Nicholl also signed trainees Neil Maddison, Alan Shearer and Steve Davis in the summer of 1986, each of whom signed professional deals over the next couple of years. Numerous players left the club prior to the start of the season – Eamonn Collins moved to Portsmouth in the Second Division, Alan Curtis was sent to Fourth Division side Cardiff City, Stuart McManus departed for Swedish club Örgryte, and both Mark Whitlock and David Puckett were sent to Bournemouth as part of the deal which brought Clarke to The Dell. In September, Steve Moran moved to Leicester City for £300,000.

The only players added to the Southampton squad partway through the season were striker Gordon Hobson, who was brought in for £125,000 from Grimsby Town in November to bolster the club's frontline, and goalkeeper Eric Nixon, who was loaned in for a month from Manchester City in December following injuries to Peter Shilton, Flowers and Phil Kite. Kite and Flowers were both loaned out towards the end of the season, to Gillingham and Swindon Town, respectively. Swindon also received striker Craig Maskell on loan at the same time, as he had failed to break into the first team. After his 1985-86 season was blighted by a knee injury, Joe Jordan spent most of the first half of the 1986-87 season in the reserves and was sold to Bristol City in February 1987. The following month, Mark Dennis was released from the club following disputes with Nicholl and the club's directors; he later joined Queens Park Rangers.

Players transferred in

Name	Nationality	Pos.	Club	Date	Fee	Ref.
Tim Flowers	England	GK	(England) Wolverhampton Wanderers	June 1986	£70,000	
Colin Clarke	Northern Ireland	FW	(England) Bournemouth	July 1986	£400,000	
Neil Maddison	England	MF	none (free agent)	July 1986	Free (Note: Neil Maddison initially signed as a trainee in July 1986, before turning professional in April 1988.)	
Alan Shearer	England	FW	(England) Wallsend Boys Club	July 1986	Free (Note: Alan Shearer initially signed as a trainee in July 1986, before turning professional in April 1988.)	
Steve Davis	England	DF	none (free agent)	August 1986	Free (Note: Steve Davis initially signed as a trainee in August 1986, before turning professional in July 1987.)	
Matthew Bound	England	DF	none (free agent)	November 1986	Free (Note: Matthew Bound initially signed as an associate schoolboy in November 1986, before becoming a trainee in July 1989.)	
Gordon Hobson	England	FW	(England) Grimsby Town	November 1986	£125,000	
Paul Tisdale	England	MF	(England) Bristol Rovers	February 1987	Free (Note: Paul Tisdale initially signed as an associate schoolboy in February 1987, before turning professional in June 1991.)	
Tommy Widdrington	England	MF	(England) Wallsend Boys Club	February 1987	Free (Note: Tommy Widdrington initially signed as an associate schoolboy in February 1987, before being a trainee in July 1988.)	

Players transferred out

Name	Nationality	Pos.	Club	Date	Fee	Ref.
Eamonn Collins	Republic of Ireland	MF	(England) Portsmouth	May 1986	Unknown	
Alan Curtis	England	MF	(Wales) Cardiff City	May 1986	Unknown	
Stuart McManus	Scotland	FW	(Sweden) Örgryte	June 1986	Unknown	
Mark Whitlock	England	DF	(England) Bournemouth	June 1986	Unknown	
David Puckett	England	FW	(England) Bournemouth	July 1986	Unknown	
Steve Moran	England	FW	(England) Leicester City	September 1986	£300,000	
Joe Jordan	Scotland	FW	(England) Bristol City	February 1987	Unknown	

Players loaned in

Name	Nationality	Pos.	Club	Date from	Date to	Ref.
Eric Nixon	England	GK	(England) Manchester City	December 1986	January 1987	

Players loaned out

Name	Nationality	Pos.	Club	Date from	Date to	Ref.
Phil Kite	England	GK	(England) Gillingham	January 1987	End of season	
Tim Flowers	England	GK	(England) Swindon Town	March 1987	End of season	
Craig Maskell	England	MF	(England) Swindon Town	March 1987	End of season	

Players released

Name	Nationality	Pos.	Date	Details	Ref.
Mark Dennis	England	DF	March 1987	Released after disputes with manager Chris Nicholl	

== Pre-season friendlies ==
Ahead of the 1986–87 league season, Southampton played six pre-season friendlies. First, the club beat Conference side Weymouth 3–1 and lost 0–2 at Portuguese side Benfica, before facing three Fourth Division sides – they drew 1–1 with Exeter City, beat Torquay United 2–1, and drew 1–1 with Wolverhampton Wanderers. A return 4–1 win over Benfica for Nick Holmes' testimonial followed.

2 August 1986 Friendly	Weymouth	1–3	Southampton	Weymouth
			Clarke; Cockerill; Maskell

5 August 1986 Friendly	Benfica	2–0	Southampton	Lisbon, Portugal
				Stadium: Estádio da Luz

9 August 1986 Friendly	Exeter City	1–1	Southampton	Exeter
			Armstrong	Stadium: St James Park

11 August 1986 Friendly	Torquay United	1–2	Southampton	Torquay
			Blake	Stadium: Plainmoor

13 August 1986 Friendly	Wolverhampton Wanderers	1–1	Southampton	Wolverhampton
			Maskell	Stadium: Molineux Stadium

16 August 1986 Nick Holmes Testimonial	Southampton	4–1	Benfica	Southampton
	Case; Clarke; Holmes; Wallace			Stadium: The Dell

== First Division ==
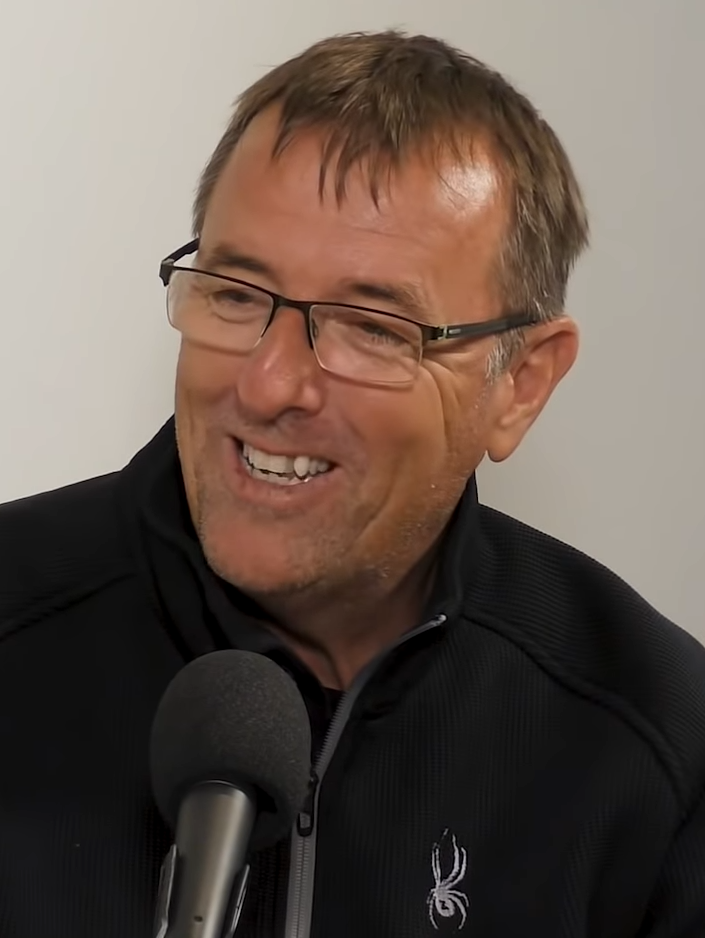
Matt Le Tissier made his professional debut for Southampton in 1986–87.

Southampton kicked off the 1986–87 season in convincing fashion, thrashing Queens Park Rangers 5–1 at The Dell and immediately going to the top of the table. Three of the hosts' goals were scored by debutant Colin Clarke, who had signed from Bournemouth just a month previously – this was the first time a Southampton player had scored a hat-trick on their debut. A disappointing spell followed as the club lost four out of their next five games, with their only victory a 2–0 home win over Tottenham Hotspur which featured Matt Le Tissier's first starting appearance for the team. The spell ended with a 1–5 thrashing at the hands of Manchester United, with goalkeeper Tim Flowers making his debut for the first team. The Saints subsequently made their way back to the top half of the league table again after winning two of three games, including a 2–1 defeat of defending champions Liverpool and a 4–1 win over Newcastle United which saw Clarke score his second hat-trick in only his ninth appearance for the club.

The run-up to the new year brought mixed fortunes for the Saints, who picked up just three wins from twelve games between mid-October and late-December: a hard-fought 3–2 away victory against strugglers Leicester City on 25 October, a 3–1 win on the road against recently promoted Charlton Athletic on 22 November, and a 3–1 victory at home to Watford on 29 November, which saw Gordon Hobson score on his Southampton debut. At the end of 1986, Southampton were just three points above the first automatic relegation spot.

1987 started much the same for the South Coast side, who dropped another two places in the league standings after failing to win a game in January – losing 1–3 to fellow strugglers Oxford United, drawing 1–1 at home to Manchester United, and losing 1–2 at Queens Park Rangers. In March, however, the club won three out of their five fixtures, each while keeping a clean sheet, to fight against the threat of relegation. The first of the wins was a 4–0 home victory over Leicester City, featuring Le Tissier's first hat-trick for the club, despite being played in what he would later describe as "probably the worst conditions I have ever played in". The second was a season-record 5–0 thrashing of Aston Villa, who would finish the season at the bottom of the table. The third win saw the Saints host high-flying Luton Town and win 3–0, moving back up to 16th in the table. In April, Hobson joined Clarke and Le Tissier as a hat-trick scorer, delivering Southampton's first away hat-trick since 1969 in a 4–2 win over Manchester City at Maine Road.

April saw Southampton embarking on an unbeaten run stretching for the last nine games of the league campaign, during which time they climbed from 17th to 12th in the table. The run consisted of six draws and three wins – the Manchester City game, a 3–0 home win over Oxford United, and a 1–0 edging of West Ham United on the penultimate day. The club finished 12th in the First Division table – an improvement of two places on the previous campaign – equal on points with Sheffield Wednesday in 13th, Chelsea in 14th and West Ham in 15th, but with the only positive goal difference of the four sides.

=== List of match results ===
23 August 1986 1	Southampton	5–1	Queens Park Rangers	Southampton
	Holmes 10'; Wallace 15'; Clarke 35', 58', 68'		Allen 70'	Stadium: The Dell; Attendance: 14,711

26 August 1986 2	Luton Town	2–1	Southampton	Luton
	Wilson 4'; Stein 50'		Clarke 72'	Stadium: Kenilworth Road; Attendance: 8,777

30 August 1986 3	Norwich City	4–3	Southampton	Norwich
	Drinkell 47'; Gordon 48'; Williams 69'; Bruce 82'		Wallace 33'; Blake 42'; Dennis 80'	Stadium: Carrow Road; Attendance: 15,250

2 September 1986 4	Southampton	2–0	Tottenham Hotspur	Southampton
	Clarke 3'; Wallace 79'			Stadium: The Dell; Attendance: 17,911

6 September 1986 5	Southampton	1–3	Nottingham Forest	Southampton
	Clarke 74'		Webb 12', 77'; Birtles 78'	Stadium: The Dell; Attendance: 14,604

13 September 1986 6	Manchester United	5–1	Southampton	Manchester
	Olsen 23' (pen.); Davenport 25'; Stapleton 38', 84'; Whiteside 52'		Clarke 23'	Stadium: Old Trafford; Attendance: 40,135

20 September 1986 7	Southampton	2–1	Liverpool	Southampton
	Armstrong 11'; Cockerill 66'		McMahon 61'	Stadium: The Dell; Attendance: 20,452

27 September 1986 8	Wimbledon	2–2	Southampton	London
	Fashanu 27', 89'		Lawrence 25'; Cockerill 72'	Stadium: Plough Lane; Attendance: 7,147

4 October 1986 9	Southampton	4–1	Newcastle United	Southampton
	Clarke 16', 70', 76'; Dennis 82'		A. Thomas 13'	Stadium: The Dell; Attendance: 14,622

11 October 1986 10	Aston Villa	3–1	Southampton	Birmingham
	Elliott 29', 64'; Evans 49' (pen.)		Wallace 53'	Stadium: Villa Park; Attendance: 16,211

18 October 1986 11	Southampton	0–2	Everton	Southampton
			Steven 79' (pen.); Wilkinson 81'	Stadium: The Dell; Attendance: 18,009

25 October 1986 12	Leicester City	2–3	Southampton	Leicester
	Osman 7'; McAllister 43'		Lawrence 8'; Clarke 45'; Wallace 87'	Stadium: Filbert Street; Attendance: 9,186

1 November 1986 13	Southampton	1–1	Manchester City	Southampton
	Clarke 17'		G. Baker 83'	Stadium: The Dell; Attendance: 14,352

8 November 1986 14	Sheffield Wednesday	3–1	Southampton	Sheffield
	Marwood 67' (pen.); Chapman 71', 77'		Le Tissier 87'	Stadium: Hillsborough Stadium; Attendance: 20,802

15 November 1986 15	Southampton	0–4	Arsenal	Southampton
			Hayes 60' (pen.); Anderson 61'; Quinn 64'; Groves 77'	Stadium: The Dell; Attendance: 18,728

22 November 1986 16	Charlton Athletic	1–3	Southampton	London
	Stuart 60'		Lawrence 19'; Clarke 65'; Case 86'	Stadium: Selhurst Park; Attendance: 5,930

29 November 1986 17	Southampton	3–1	Watford	Southampton
	Wright 7'; Clarke 11'; Hobson 81'		Terry 77'	Stadium: The Dell; Attendance: 14,537

6 December 1986 18	West Ham United	3–1	Southampton	London
	Ince 15'; Devonshire 42'; Cottee 60' (pen.)		Clarke 19'	Stadium: Boleyn Ground; Attendance: 18,111

20 December 1986 19	Nottingham Forest	0–0	Southampton	Nottingham
				Stadium: City Ground; Attendance: 15,394

26 December 1986 20	Southampton	1–2	Chelsea	Southampton
	Clarke 24'		McLaughlin 56'; Bumstead 87'	Stadium: The Dell; Attendance: 12,709

27 December 1986 21	Arsenal	1–0	Southampton	London
	Quinn 73'			Stadium: Arsenal Stadium; Attendance: 38,138

1 January 1987 22	Oxford United	3–1	Southampton	Oxford
	Aldridge 32' (pen.); Whitehurst 36'; Houghton 62'		Case 48'	Stadium: Manor Ground; Attendance: 9,777

3 January 1987 23	Southampton	1–1	Manchester United	Southampton
	Holmes 4'		Olsen 11'	Stadium: The Dell; Attendance: 20,409

24 January 1987 24	Queens Park Rangers	2–1	Southampton	London
	Byrne 2'; Bannister 81'		Case 72'	Stadium: Loftus Road; Attendance: 10,200

3 February 1987 25	Southampton	2–0	Coventry City	Southampton
	Cockerill 46', 66'			Stadium: The Dell; Attendance: 11,508

7 February 1987 26	Southampton	1–2	Norwich City	Southampton
	Cockerill 68'		Phelan 55'; Drinkell 79'	Stadium: The Dell; Attendance: 12,754

14 February 1987 27	Tottenham Hotspur	2–0	Southampton	London
	Gough 8'; Hodge 61'			Stadium: White Hart Lane; Attendance: 22,066

28 February 1987 28	Liverpool	1–0	Southampton	Liverpool
	Aldridge 59'			Stadium: Anfield; Attendance: 33,133

7 March 1987 29	Southampton	4–0	Leicester City	Southampton
	Le Tissier 29', 62', 82'; Hobson 58'			Stadium: The Dell; Attendance: 11,611

14 March 1987 30	Everton	3–0	Southampton	Liverpool
	Wright 12' (o.g.); Power 15'; Watson 55'			Stadium: Goodison Park; Attendance: 26,564

21 March 1987 31	Southampton	5–0	Aston Villa	Southampton
	Hobson 1'; Cockerill 3'; Clarke 19', 38'; Wallace 83'			Stadium: The Dell; Attendance: 13,686

24 March 1987 32	Southampton	3–0	Luton Town	Southampton
	Townsend 3'; Lawrence 13', 75'			Stadium: The Dell; Attendance: 12,117

28 March 1987 33	Newcastle United	2–0	Southampton	Newcastle upon Tyne
	Goddard 23'; Gascoigne 60'			Stadium: St James' Park; Attendance: 22,717

7 April 1987 34	Southampton	2–2	Wimbledon	Southampton
	Gayle 3' (o.g.); Lawrence 82'		Fairweather 55'; Joseph 77'	Stadium: The Dell; Attendance: 12,811

11 April 1987 35	Manchester City	2–4	Southampton	Manchester
	Stewart 28'; Moulden 89'		Hobson 43', 68', 81' (pen.); Wallace 52'	Stadium: Maine Road; Attendance: 18,193

18 April 1987 36	Southampton	3–0	Oxford United	Southampton
	Cockerill 70'; Hobson 72'; Wallace 83'			Stadium: The Dell; Attendance: 15,025

20 April 1987 37	Chelsea	1–1	Southampton	London
	Nevin 39'		Clarke 74'	Stadium: Stamford Bridge; Attendance: 11,512

22 April 1987 38	Southampton	1–1	Sheffield Wednesday	Southampton
	Chapman 31'		Le Tissier 74'	Stadium: The Dell; Attendance: 13,014

25 April 1987 39	Southampton	2–2	Charlton Athletic	Southampton
	Bond 68'; Lawrence 74'		Melrose 20'; Lee 78'	Stadium: The Dell; Attendance: 13,534

2 May 1987 40	Watford	1–1	Southampton	Watford
	Terry 3'		Le Tissier 19'	Stadium: Vicarage Road; Attendance: 13,067

4 May 1987 41	Southampton	1–0	West Ham United	Southampton
	Clarke 49'			Stadium: The Dell; Attendance: 16,810

9 May 1987 42	Coventry City	1–1	Southampton	Coventry
	Kilcline 29'		Lawrence 38'	Stadium: Highfield Road; Attendance: 22,619

=== Final league table ===
Pos	Team	Pld	W	D	L	GF	GA	GD	Pts	Qualification or relegation
10	Coventry City (Note: Coventry City would have qualified as FA Cup winners.)	42	17	12	13	50	45	+5	63	Disqualified from the European Cup Winners' Cup
11	Manchester United	42	14	14	14	52	45	+7	56	
12	Southampton	42	14	10	18	69	68	+1	52	
13	Sheffield Wednesday	42	13	13	16	58	59	−1	52	
14	Chelsea	42	13	13	16	53	64	−11	52	

Source: RSSSF
Rules for classification: 1) Points; 2) Goal difference; 3) Goals scored

=== Results by matchday ===
Round	1	2	3	4	5	6	7	8	9	10	11	12	13	14	15	16	17	18	19	20	21	22	23	24	25	26	27	28	29	30	31	32	33	34	35	36	37	38	39	40	41	42
Ground	H	A	A	H	H	A	H	A	H	A	H	A	H	A	H	A	H	A	A	H	A	A	H	A	H	H	A	A	H	A	H	H	A	H	A	H	A	H	H	A	H	A
Result	W	L	L	W	L	L	W	D	W	L	L	W	D	L	L	W	W	L	D	L	L	L	D	L	W	L	L	L	W	L	W	W	L	D	W	W	D	D	D	D	W	D
Position	1	7	15	7	13	16	14	13	9	13	15	13	12	14	15	13	11	14	14	16	16	17	17	18	16	17	17	18	17	17	16	16	17	16	15	15	15	15	15	16	13	12

Source: 11v11.com
A = Away; H = Home; W = Win; D = Draw; L = Loss

== FA Cup ==
Southampton entered the 1986–87 FA Cup in the third round drawn away to Everton, who had finished the previous season as runners-up in both the First Division and the FA Cup. Despite facing such high-calibre opponents away from home, the Saints held their own for much of the first half, before Graeme Sharp opened the scoring for the hosts in the 37th minute, converting a "stupendous pass" from Adrian Heath past returning goalkeeper Peter Shilton. The Toffees came close to doubling their lead on multiple occasions shortly after half-time, but it was the visitors who scored next when Gordon Hobson netted from a Danny Wallace setup. The deadlock lasted only five minutes, however, as Sharp scored his and his team's second with "a header hailed by the press as one of the best seen at Goodison in years". Colin Clarke came close to equalising again for the Saints with two late chances, but Everton ultimately went through to the fourth round, knocking Southampton out at the first hurdle for the first time since 1983.

10 January 1987 Round 3	Everton	2–1	Southampton	Liverpool
	Sharp 37', 67'		Hobson 62'	Stadium: Goodison Park; Attendance: 32,320

== League Cup ==
Southampton entered the 1986–87 League Cup in the second round against Third Division promotion hopefuls Swindon Town. In the first leg at home, the First Division side won 3–0 thanks to a first-half brace from George Lawrence and a last-minute tap-in from Joe Jordan. In the return leg at the County Ground two weeks later, Southampton held Swindon to a goalless draw to secure their status in the next round, with goalkeeper Peter Shilton keeping the score down. In the third round, the Saints held out for another goalless draw away, this time at Manchester United, before beating them 4–1 in the replay thanks to goals from Lawrence, Danny Wallace and Matt Le Tissier (two) – this was the last game in charge of United for Ron Atkinson, who was sacked just two days later.

In the fourth round, the Saints again faced First Division rivals, this time hosting relegation-threatened Aston Villa. The hosts won the game 2–1, which was marked by three players (two for Villa) being sent off late on. The fifth round saw Southampton hosting again, this time second-tier side Shrewsbury Town, who they edged out 1–0 thanks to a second-half penalty from Colin Clarke. In the two-legged semi-finals, Southampton faced defending First Division champions Liverpool. The first leg, at home, finished goalless, despite the visitors going one man down early in the second half. The second leg, at Anfield, saw Liverpool break the Saints down in the second half, winning 3–0 thanks to goals in the 66th, 74th and 84th minutes. Liverpool went on to lose the final 1–2 to Arsenal.

23 September 1986 Round 2 Leg 1	Southampton	3–0	Swindon Town	Southampton
	Lawrence 8', 42'; Jordan 90'			Stadium: The Dell; Attendance: 10,458

8 October 1986 Round 2 Leg 2	Swindon Town	0–0 (0–3 agg.)	Southampton	Swindon
				Stadium: County Ground; Attendance: 9,453

29 October 1986 Round 3	Manchester United	0–0	Southampton	Manchester
				Stadium: Old Trafford; Attendance: 23,639

4 November 1986 Round 3 Replay	Southampton	4–1	Manchester United	Southampton
	Lawrence 43'; Wallace 71'; Le Tissier 75', 84'		Davenport 88'	Stadium: The Dell; Attendance: 17,915

18 November 1986 Round 4	Southampton	2–1	Aston Villa	Southampton
	Case 17'; Clarke 64'		Evans 67' (pen.)	Stadium: The Dell; Attendance: 13,402

26 January 1987 Round 5	Southampton	1–0	Shrewsbury Town	Southampton
	Clarke 68' (pen.)			Stadium: The Dell; Attendance: 12,940

11 February 1987 Semi-Final Leg 1	Southampton	0–0	Liverpool	Southampton
				Stadium: The Dell; Attendance: 22,818

25 February 1987 Semi-Final Leg 2	Liverpool	3–0 (3–0 agg.)	Southampton	Liverpool
	Whelan 66'; Dalglish 74'; Mølby 84'			Stadium: Anfield; Attendance: 38,481

== Full Members' Cup ==
In 1986–87, Southampton entered the Full Members' Cup for the first time, facing Second Division club Hull City in the second round at The Dell. The Saints beat the Tigers 2–1 thanks to two goals in quick succession from Matt Le Tissier. In the third round, Southampton hosted First Division rivals Norwich City, losing 1–2 after extra time courtesy of a 91st-minute goal from Robert Rosario.

25 November 1986 Round 2	Southampton	2–1	Hull City	Southampton
	Le Tissier 30', 32'		Parker 59'	Stadium: The Dell; Attendance: 4,518

9 December 1986 Round 3	Southampton	1–2 (a.e.t.)	Norwich City	Southampton
	Case 87' (pen.)		Biggins 48'; Rosario 91'	Stadium: The Dell; Attendance: 5,745

== Other matches ==
Southampton played four additional matches during 1986–87. The first two were testimonials in October – a 3–1 win over local non-league side Road-Sea Southampton and a 7–1 thrashing of Salisbury the week after. In November, the Saints beat Western League side Melksham Town 3–0; and in April, they drew 2–2 with Taunton Town, also of the Western League, in a testimonial for Jimmy Greene.

14 October 1986 Nick Farmer Testimonial	Road-Sea Southampton	1–3	Southampton	Southampton
			Sylvanus; Mann	Stadium: Road-Sea Park

21 October 1986 Ricky Haysom Testimonial	Salisbury	1–7	Southampton	Salisbury
			Maskell; Baker; Case; Cockerill; Gittens; Lawrence

10 November 1986 Friendly	Melksham Town	0–3	Southampton	Melksham
			Lawrence; Jordan	Stadium: Conigre

28 April 1987 Jimmy Greene Testimonial	Taunton Town	2–2	Southampton	Taunton
			Maskell; Lawrence	Stadium: Wordsworth Drive

== Player details ==
Southampton used 23 different players during the 1986–87 season, 15 of whom scored during the campaign. Midfielder Glenn Cockerill was the only player to feature in all 53 of the club's games, winning the Southampton F.C. Player of the Season award at the end of the season. Colin Clarke finished as the season's top goalscorer in his first season at the club, scoring 20 times in the league and twice in the League Cup run. He was followed by George Lawrence and Matt Le Tissier on eleven and ten goals, respectively, in all competitions.

=== Squad statistics ===
Name	Pos.	Nat.	League		FA Cup		League Cup		FM Cup		Total	
Name	Pos.	Nat.	Apps.	Gls.	Apps.	Gls.	Apps.	Gls.	Apps.	Gls.	Apps.	Gls.
David Armstrong	MF	(England)	22	1	0	0	4	0	0	0	26	1
Steve Baker	DF	(England)	19(7)	0	0	0	5(1)	0	2	0	26(8)	0
Mark Blake	DF	(England)	9	1	0	0	0	0	0(2)	0	9(2)	1
Kevin Bond	DF	(England)	34	1	1	0	5	0	2	0	42	1
Kevan Brown	DF	(England)	0	0	0	0	0	0	0	0	0	0
Gary Bull	FW	(England)	0	0	0	0	0	0	0	0	0	0
Jimmy Case	MF	(England)	39	3	0	0	8	1	2	1	49	5
Colin Clarke	FW	(Northern Ireland)	33	20	1	0	8	2	1	0	43	22
Glenn Cockerill	MF	(England)	42	7	1	0	8	0	2	0	53	7
Gerry Forrest	DF	(England)	37(1)	0	1	0	7	0	1	0	46(1)	0
Jon Gittens	DF	(England)	14	0	1	0	4	0	0	0	19	0
Keith Granger	GK	(England)	0	0	0	0	0	0	0	0	0	0
Ian Hamilton	MF	(England)	0	0	0	0	0	0	0	0	0	0
Gordon Hobson	FW	(England)	20	7	1	1	0	0	2	0	23	8
Nick Holmes	MF	(England)	8(1)	2	1	0	2	0	0	0	11(1)	2
George Lawrence	MF	(England)	34(2)	8	0	0	6(1)	3	2	0	42(3)	11
Matt Le Tissier	MF	(England)	12(12)	6	0(1)	0	0(4)	2	1(1)	2	13(18)	10
Eric Nixon	GK	(England)	4	0	0	0	0	0	0	0	4	0
Phil Parkinson	MF	(England)	0	0	0	0	0	0	0	0	0	0
Peter Shilton	GK	(England)	29	0	1	0	8	0	2	0	40	0
Allen Tankard	DF	(England)	2	0	0	0	0	0	2	0	4	0
Andy Townsend	MF	(Republic of Ireland)	11(3)	1	0	0	2(1)	0	0	0	13(4)	1
Danny Wallace	FW	(England)	31	8	1	0	7	1	1	0	40	9
Mark Wright	DF	(England)	30	1	1	0	7	0	2	0	40	1
Players with appearances who left before the end of the season
Mark Dennis	DF	(England)	20	2	1	0	6	0	0	0	27	2
Joe Jordan	FW	(Scotland)	2	0	0	0	1	1	0(1)	0	3(1)	1
Players with appearances who ended the season out on loan
Tim Flowers	GK	(England)	9	0	0	0	0	0	0	0	9	0
Craig Maskell	FW	(England)	2(2)	0	0	0	0	0	0	0	2(2)	0

=== Most appearances ===
Rank	Name	Pos.	League		FA Cup		League Cup		FM Cup		Total		
Rank	Name	Pos.	Starts	Subs	Starts	Subs	Starts	Subs	Starts	Subs	Starts	Subs	Total
1	Glenn Cockerill	MF	42	0	1	0	8	0	2	0	53	0	53
2	Jimmy Case	MF	39	0	0	0	8	0	2	0	49	0	49
3	Gerry Forrest	DF	37	1	1	0	7	0	1	0	46	1	47
4	George Lawrence	MF	34	2	0	0	6	1	2	0	42	3	45
5	Colin Clarke	FW	33	0	1	0	8	0	1	0	43	0	43
6	Kevin Bond	DF	34	0	1	0	5	0	2	0	42	0	42
7	Danny Wallace	FW	31	0	1	0	7	0	1	0	40	0	40
8	Peter Shilton	GK	29	0	1	0	8	0	2	0	40	0	40
8	Mark Wright	DF	30	0	1	0	7	0	2	0	40	0	40
10	Steve Baker	DF	19	7	0	0	5	1	2	0	26	8	34

=== Top goalscorers ===
Rank	Name	Pos.	League		FA Cup		League Cup		FM Cup		Total		
Rank	Name	Pos.	Goals	Apps	Goals	Apps	Goals	Apps	Goals	Apps	Goals	Apps	GPG
1	Colin Clarke	FW	20	33	0	1	2	8	0	1	22	43	0.51
2	George Lawrence	MF	8	36	0	0	3	7	0	2	11	45	0.24
3	Matt Le Tissier	MF	6	24	0	1	2	4	2	2	10	31	0.32
4	Danny Wallace	FW	8	31	0	1	1	7	0	1	9	40	0.23
5	Gordon Hobson	FW	7	20	1	1	0	0	0	2	8	23	0.35
6	Glenn Cockerill	MF	7	42	0	1	0	8	0	2	7	53	0.13
7	Jimmy Case	MF	3	39	0	0	1	8	1	2	5	49	0.10
8	Nick Holmes	MF	2	9	0	1	0	2	0	0	2	12	0.17
8	Mark Dennis	DF	2	20	0	1	0	6	0	0	2	27	0.07
10	Joe Jordan	FW	0	2	0	0	1	1	0	1	1	4	0.25
10	Mark Blake	DF	1	9	0	0	0	0	0	2	1	11	0.09
10	Andy Townsend	MF	1	14	0	0	0	3	0	0	1	17	0.06
10	David Armstrong	MF	1	22	0	0	0	4	0	0	1	26	0.04
10	Mark Wright	DF	1	30	0	1	0	7	0	2	1	40	0.03
10	Kevin Bond	DF	1	34	0	1	0	5	0	2	1	42	0.02

== Bibliography ==
- Holley, Duncan; Chalk, Gary (2003), Bull, David (ed.), In That Number: A Post-War Chronicle of Southampton FC, Bristol, England: Hagiology Publishing, ISBN 0-9534474-3-X
