= Graham Baker (footballer) =

English footballer (born 1958)

Personal information
- Full name: Graham Edgar Baker
- Date of birth: 3 December 1958 (age 67)
- Place of birth: Southampton, England
- Height: 5 ft 9 in (1.75 m)
- Position: Midfielder

Youth career
- 1973–1976: Southampton

Senior career*
Years	Team	Apps	(Gls)
1976–1982	Southampton	113	(21)
1982–1987	Manchester City	117	(19)
1987–1990	Southampton	60	(9)
1990	→ Aldershot (loan)	7	(2)
1990–1992	Fulham	10	(1)

International career
1980	England U21	2	(0)

Managerial career
- 1994: Petersfield Town
- 2009–2011: Woking
- * Club domestic league appearances and goals

Graham Baker (born 3 December 1958) is an English former footballer who played as a midfielder for Southampton, Manchester City and Fulham.

== Playing career ==
=== Southampton ===
Born in Southampton, Baker started his football career when he signed for Southampton F.C. as a junior in 1973. His first team debut came on 12 November 1977 in a Second Division match against Blackpool, in which he scored in the opening minute. Baker made only two further appearances that season, in which Southampton were promoted to the First Division.

He was a hard-tackling, hustling type of player who could pass and shoot and was one of the most industrious performers in Southampton's successful quest to re-establish themselves in Division 1. In the 1978–79 season he established himself in the first team, making 22 League appearances in midfield, playing alongside Steve Williams, Alan Ball and Nick Holmes. Although Southampton played in the League Cup final in 1979, Baker only made one substitute appearance during the whole run, with either Trevor Hebberd or Austin Hayes generally being preferred.

Over the next three seasons, he continued to be a regular in Saints' midfield, and in the 1980–81 season he was a virtual ever-present making 39 appearances (scoring 8 goals), now playing alongside Kevin Keegan and Mick Channon, as Saints finished in 6th place in Division 1, then their highest league finish.

During his time at Southampton he was twice capped by England at under-21 level, playing against Norway and Romania in 1980. He made 113 League appearances for Southampton before being sold to John Bond's Manchester City for £350,000 in the 1982 close season, as Lawrie McMenemy needed to raise funds to finance the signing of Peter Shilton.

=== Manchester City ===
Baker's Manchester City career started well; the team won four of their first five games, including a 2–1 win over Tottenham Hotspur in which Baker scored both goals, and City became early league leaders. However, the good form did not last and the season turned into a struggle in the bottom half of the table, culminating in relegation on the final day of the season.

The 1983–84 season was a reasonably prosperous one for Baker as he scored 8 goals in 36 games, equalling the highest goal scoring return of his career, though Manchester City finished one place short of promotion. Injuries disrupted Baker's next season, in which he made 29 appearances in a promotion winning side. On his return to the top flight, Baker made few appearances – nine in the 1985–86 season and thirteen in 1986–87. In 1987 Manchester City were again relegated, and Baker returned to Southampton on a free transfer, having made 135 Manchester City appearances in five years.

=== Return to Southampton ===
By now, Southampton were under the management of Chris Nicholl, and the "glory days" of McMenemy were becoming a distant memory. At first, Baker was again a first-choice player, making 36 appearances in 1987–88, alongside Jimmy Case, Glenn Cockerill, and Andy Townsend, with the emerging talents of Danny Wallace and Alan Shearer up front. Gradually, however, his career at Southampton was disrupted by injury, and in 1990 he went to Fulham on a free transfer after losing his place in midfield to Barry Horne.

== Managerial and coaching career ==
In 1988 Baker was the manager of Locks Heath Dynamos Youth Team. Winning the Portsmouth Lads League in two consecutive seasons and the Sperrings Intermediate Cup, Baker drew comparisons to a young Brian Clough. He had a brief spell in 1994 as manager at Petersfield Town and from 1995 to 2003 he was a coach with Carshalton Athletic. In 2005 became Youth Development Officer at Woking, under the management of former Southampton colleague, Glenn Cockerill. Glenn Cockerill departed in March 2007 and Graham Baker was appointed joint caretaker manager with club captain Neil Smith.

He took over as caretaker manager at Woking on 2 April 2009, following the sacking of Phil Gilchrist. The club's relegation from the Conference National was confirmed on 21 April, while he was in charge. The following day, he was given the job permanently, but Baker left the club on 19 January 2011. Baker was appointed Head of Youth at Aldershot Town in 2011.

== Career statistics ==
Appearances and goals by club, season and competition
Club	Season	League			FA Cup		League Cup		Other		Total	
Club	Season	Division	Apps	Goals	Apps	Goals	Apps	Goals	Apps	Goals	Apps	Goals
Southampton
Southampton	1977–78	Second Division	3	1	0	0	0	0	—		3	1
Southampton	1978–79	First Division	22	4	1	0	1	0	—		24	4
Southampton	1979–80	First Division	23	4	0	0	3	2	—		26	6
Southampton	1980–81	First Division	39	8	3	1	2	0	—		44	9
Southampton	1981–82	First Division	26	4	0	0	1	0	2 (Note: Appearances in UEFA Cup)	0	29	4
Southampton	Total		113	21	4	1	7	2	2	0	126	24
Manchester City
Manchester City	1982–83	First Division	27	4	0	0	4	0	—		31	4
Manchester City	1983–84	Second Division	36	8	1	0	3	0	—		40	8
Manchester City	1984–85	Second Division	29	4	1	0	3	0	—		33	4
Manchester City	1985–86	First Division	10	0	0	0	2	0	3 (Note: Appearances in Full Members' Cup)	2	15	2
Manchester City	1986–87	First Division	15	3	1	0	2	0	1	0	19	3
Manchester City	Total		117	19	3	0	14	0	4	2	138	21
Southampton
Southampton	1987–88	First Division	36	5	2	0	1	0	1	0	40	5
Southampton	1988–89	First Division	21	4	2	0	7	2	1	0	31	6
Southampton	1989–90	First Division	3	0	0	0	0	0	—		3	0
Southampton	Total		60	9	4	0	8	2	2	0	74	11
Aldershot (loan)	1989–90	Fourth Division	7	2	0	0	0	0	—		7	2
Fulham
Fulham	1990–91	Third Division	6	1	0	0	2	0	—		8	1
Fulham	1991–92	Third Division	4	0	0	0	1	0	—		5	0
Fulham	Total		10	1	0	0	3	0	0	0	13	1
Career total			307	52	11	1	32	4	8	2	358	59

== Honours ==
Manchester City

- Full Members' Cup runner-up: 1985–86

== Bibliography ==
- Duncan Holley & Gary Chalk (2003). In That Number – A post-war chronicle of Southampton FC. Hagiology Publishing. ISBN 0-9534474-3-X.
- Duncan Holley & Gary Chalk (1992). The Alphabet of the Saints. ACL & Polar Publishing. ISBN 0-9514862-3-3.
- Clayton, David (2002). Everything under the blue moon: the complete book of Manchester City FC – and more!. Edinburgh: Mainstream publishing. ISBN 1-84018-687-9.
