= George Lawrence (footballer, born 1962) =

English footballer

Personal information
- Full name: George Randolph Lawrence
- Date of birth: 14 September 1962 (age 64)
- Place of birth: Kensington, England
- Height: 5 ft 10 in (1.78 m)
- Position: Midfielder

Youth career
- 1979–1980: Southampton

Senior career*
Years	Team	Apps	(Gls)
1980–1982	Southampton	10	(1)
1982	→Oxford United (loan)	15	(4)
1982–1985	Oxford United	63	(21)
1985–1987	Southampton	70	(11)
1987–1989	Millwall	28	(4)
1989–1992	Bournemouth	75	(5)
1992	MP Mikkeli	13	(6)
1993	Weymouth		
1993	Portsmouth	12	(0)
1993–1996	Hibernians	46	(22)
1996–1997	Hednesford Town		
- Rushden & Diamonds
- * Club domestic league appearances and goals

George Randolph Lawrence (born 14 September 1962) is a former professional footballer now retired. He played as a midfielder, spending most of his career with Oxford United, Southampton and AFC Bournemouth. He was known by the nickname "Chicken George" throughout his career.

== Playing career ==
Lawrence was born in Kensington, London and was a pupil at Christopher Wren School where he was spotted by Southampton's London scouting network, joining The Saints as a trainee in August 1979. He made his debut in a League Cup match against Chelsea on 6 October 1981 replacing Nick Holmes. He made his first appearance in the starting line-up on 17 October, replacing Mick Channon in a league game against Notts County.

According to Holley & Chalk's The Alphabet of the Saints, he "soon brought added meaning to the word unpredictable". He was "full of strong surging runs" and "would, when remembering to take the ball with him, completely perplex opposing defenders and cause havoc in the penalty area".

In his first period at The Dell, Southampton had an abundance of strikers, including Channon and Steve Moran, together with Kevin Keegan, Steve Williams and David Armstrong in midfield, so his chances were limited. He spent the end of the 1981–82 season on loan at Oxford United and, after returning to Southampton for the start of the following season, he moved permanently to Oxford in November 1982.

After two years with Oxford, in January 1985 he was rather surprisingly re-signed by Lawrie McMenemy. Again, Lawrence was in competition with several strikers including Moran, Joe Jordan, Alan Curtis and Danny Wallace.

The 1986–87 season was his most successful with Southampton, making 36 League appearances and was the club's (joint) second-best scorer for the season with eight goals (a long way behind Colin Clarke with twenty). It was somewhat of a surprise to the Saints fans, therefore, when he was sold to Millwall for £160,000 in July 1987, although by now Matt Le Tissier and Alan Shearer were coming up through the ranks and were pushing for promotion to the first team. In his two periods with the Saints he made 104 appearances in all competitions, scoring 15 goals.

In his first season at Millwall, he helped them win the Football League Division 2 championship, and then spent the 1988–89 season with them in the First Division. He then spent three years at AFC Bournemouth before spending the summer of 1992 in Finland with Mikkelin Palloilijat. In 1993, he made 14 appearances for Portsmouth, all from the substitutes' bench (without scoring). He finished his playing career with a spell in Malta, playing with Hibernians F.C. where he won two consecutive titles, followed by lower-league football.

Since retiring from playing professionally, he has continued to turn out in veterans' matches as well as earning a living as a player's agent.

== Honours ==
Oxford United

- Football League Third Division: 1983–84

Millwall

- Football League Second Division: 1987–88

Hibernians

- Maltese Premier League: 1993–94, 1994–95

== Chicken George ==
Throughout his career, he was affectionately known by the nickname "Chicken George", after the character in the TV series Roots which was being aired on British television at the time he started his career.
