= Steve Mills (footballer) =

English footballer

Personal information
- Full name: Stephen John Mills
- Date of birth: 9 December 1953
- Place of birth: Portsmouth, England
- Date of death: 1 August 1988 (aged 34)
- Place of death: Southampton, England
- Height: 5 ft 7 in (1.70 m)
- Position: Full-back

Youth career
- 1969–1971: Southampton

Senior career*
Years	Team	Apps	(Gls)
1971–1977	Southampton	61	(0)
1976	→ Miami Toros (loan)	12	(0)
1977–1978	Weymouth		

International career
1974	England U23	1	(0)
- * Club domestic league appearances and goals

Stephen John Mills (9 December 1953 – 1 August 1988) was an English professional footballer with Southampton who had his career cut short by a serious car accident, before dying from leukaemia aged 34.

== Early life ==
Mills was born in Portsmouth, the grandson of Portsmouth's 1934 FA Cup goalkeeper, Jock Gilfillan. He attended Gosport County Grammar School and represented Hampshire Schools. He came to The Dell on a week's trial as a 15-year-old schoolboy and was promptly snapped up by manager Ted Bates, joining the Saints as a trainee in February 1969, signing as a professional in July 1971.

== Playing career ==
He was extremely quick and a fierce tackler – a natural right-back. He made his debut on 3 October 1972 (aged 18) against Notts County in the Football League Cup. At the end of the 1972–73 season he made his league debut, and in the following season, became a regular full-back. A series of impressive appearances for Southampton earned him recognition for England at under-23 level.

He appeared to be on the verge of an illustrious career, when he was involved in a serious car accident in February 1975. He was on his way home from a night out with friends at Portsmouth Greyhound Stadium, when the car in which he was travelling hit a kerb and overturned. Whilst the other occupants of the car survived with minor injuries, Steve sustained a fractured pelvis and back injuries. At the time, doctors questioned whether he would ever walk again, but within 12 weeks he was out of hospital.

After a gruelling stint at an Army rehabilitation centre, he flew to the USA where he played football for Miami Toros to regain match fitness. He made his comeback match on the final day of the 1975–76 season, a week before the FA Cup final, replacing the suspended David Peach. Sadly, his fitness had been irrevocably damaged and he was forced to give up the game after 2 matches in the following season.

== Illness and death ==
After finally retiring from playing, he moved back to Gosport, and took over his parents' newsagency, before, in 1986, discovering that he had leukaemia. He was diagnosed as suffering from a complicated mixture of myeloid and lymphoblastic leukaemia.

Mills vigorously fought the disease and became involved in charity work by establishing a fund for leukaemia research.

Despite being hospitalised by the side effects of his medical treatment, he organised the biggest charity match ever seen in the South of England with an all-time Saints XI playing the then current team at The Dell in May 1988, involving players such as Mick Channon, Alan Ball, Kevin Keegan and Martin Chivers playing in front of a capacity crowd of over 20,000. Mills received an emotional standing ovation when he appeared on the pitch.

He died on 1 August 1988, having battled against the illness for two years.

On 23 October 2021 his memory was honoured with the Forever Saint award, presented to his family at St Mary's Stadium where Southampton were playing Burnley.

== The Steve Mills Stem Cell Laboratory ==
The charity fund he established before he died raised more than £100,000 towards creating a stem cell laboratory, which was opened at Southampton's Royal South Hants Hospital a year later. The charity continued to provide funds for research into leukaemia over the next 18 years, and in September 2006 the laboratory moved to a new location at Southampton General Hospital. The new unit was officially opened on 27 September 2006 by Steve's widow Jo and former Southampton footballer and manager, Alan Ball.

- The Steve Mills Stem Cell Laboratory processes, stores and issues stem cell products for transplant.
- The processing of a patient's stem cell products takes around 3 hours to complete.
- Stem cell donations are processed as soon as they arrive at the laboratory because stem cells have a shelf life of just 24 hours.
- The laboratory reacts quickly to hospital requests and processes up to 12 stem cell donations a week.
- The laboratory processes stem cells for Southampton University Hospitals Trust, Bournemouth Hospital, Poole Hospital, Salisbury District Hospital St. Georges Hospital and Dorset County Hospital.
- In addition to processing, storing and issuing stem cell products, the laboratory undertakes critical research and development of new cancer therapies and treatments.
