= Gordon Hobson =

English footballer

Personal information
- Date of birth: 27 November 1957 (age 68)
- Place of birth: Sheffield, England
- Height: 5 ft 9 in (1.75 m)
- Position: Forward

Youth career
- Winterton Rangers
- Sheffield Rangers
- Manchester Villa (Chesterfield)

Senior career*
Years	Team	Apps	(Gls)
1977–1985	Lincoln City	272	(73)
1985–1986	Grimsby Town	52	(18)
1986–1988	Southampton	33	(8)
1988–1990	Lincoln City	61	(23)
1990–1991	Exeter City	38	(7)
1991	Walsall	3	(0)
1991–1992	Farnborough Town		
1992–1998	Salisbury City		(9)
- * Club domestic league appearances and goals

Gordon Hobson (born 27 November 1957) is an English retired footballer who played as a forward, spending most of his career with Lincoln City, with shorter periods at Grimsby Town, Southampton and Exeter City.

== Football career ==
Hobson was born in Sheffield attending Firth Park School but played his youth football with Winterton Rangers in Lincolnshire. Trained as a plumber, Hobson continued to play in local football, turning out for Sheffield Rangers on Saturdays and for Manchester Villa, a Chesterfield pub team, on Sundays.

Shortly after his 20th birthday, he was signed by Lincoln City, then in the Football League Third Division. He made his professional debut against Cambridge United in April 1978, producing "a sparkling performance in which he seemed to mesmerise the opposition defenders" with his crosses from the right flank providing two goals for "the Imps" and scoring once himself in a 4–1 victory.

Hobson quickly became established as a first-team regular, generally playing at outside-left with Glenn Cockerill on the right and Mick Harford in the centre. After being relegated in 1979 and a lacklustre 1979–80 season (in which Hobson scored his first hat-trick in a 5–2 victory at Torquay on the final day of the campaign), manager Colin Murphy moved Hobson into the centre where his 21 goals helped the Imps secure promotion to Division Three with a second-place finish behind Southend United. A highlight of the promotion season was an 8–0 demolition of Northampton Town in which Hobson scored four times.

In 1981–82, Lincoln mounted a creditable attempt to reach the Second Division, missing out on promotion by one point. Over the next few seasons, Lincoln generally finished in mid-table and in the summer of 1985, Murphy resigned. In June, Hobson moved on to Grimsby Town of the Second Division for a £35,000 fee. In his first season at Grimsby, Hobson finished leading scorer with 15 league goals.

In November 1986 he was sold to First Division Southampton for £120,000 where he linked up with Cockerill, his former Lincoln City teammate. He made his debut for "the Saints" on 29 November 1986 when he scored the final goal in a 3–1 victory at home to Watford, knocking in the loose ball after goalkeeper Tony Coton failed to hold a shot from Cockerill. On 11 April 1987, Hobson scored three goals at Maine Road, where Southampton defeated Manchester City 4–2. Hobson's hat-trick (a header, a tap-in and a penalty) was the Saints' first away from home for 18 years.

Although he showed "a nice sense of balance and an eye for goal", Hobson suffered from an ankle injury after a month of the 1987–88 season. Graham Baker took his place in the side, and by the time that he was fit again, Hobson found it hard to break back into the team, especially with the emergence of younger players such as Rod Wallace, Matthew Le Tissier and Alan Shearer.

In September 1988, he returned to Sincil Bank, rejoining Lincoln City for a club record fee of £60,000. His first match back at Lincoln was a League Cup match against the club he had just left, Southampton, in which Hobson scored City's consolation goal at The Dell. Hobson spent two more years with Lincoln, finishing as top scorer both seasons, with a hat-trick in a 4–1 win at table-topping Burnley in November 1988. In his two spells with Lincoln, Hobson made a total of 386 first-team appearances, scoring 105 goals.

In the summer of 1990, he joined Exeter City for one last season of League football before dropping down to the lower leagues. At Salisbury City, he became player/coach from 1992 to 1994, later becoming assistant manager.

== Career after football ==
Hobson retained his home in the Southampton area and became a director of a yacht charter and sales business, based in nearby Hamble-le-Rice.

== Honours ==
Lincoln City

- Football League Group Cup runner-up: 1982–83
