= Gerry Forrest =

English footballer and manager

Personal information
- Full name: Gerald Forrest
- Date of birth: 21 January 1957 (age 69)
- Place of birth: Stockton-on-Tees, England
- Height: 5 ft 10 in (1.78 m)
- Position: Full-back

Youth career
- Billingham Town
- South Bank

Senior career*
Years	Team	Apps	(Gls)
1977–1985	Rotherham United	357	(8)
1985–1990	Southampton	115	(0)
1990–1991	Rotherham United	34	(0)
1991–1992	Gateshead		
1992	Billingham Town		

Managerial career
- 1993: Darlington (caretaker manager)
- * Club domestic league appearances and goals

Gerald Forrest (born 21 January 1957) is an English retired footballer who played at full-back for Rotherham United and Southampton.

== Football career ==
Born in Stockton-on-Tees, Forrest played his youth football with Billingham Town and was a member of the Stockton Youth Representative team in the mid-1970s.

He then joined South Bank of the Northern League from where he was invited to Rotherham United for a trial in February 1977. After making an impression on manager Jimmy McGuigan, Forrest was signed as a professional and went straight into Rotherham's first team at the start of the 1977–78 season, remaining an automatic choice for several years. In 1981, Rotherham were Third Division champions but after two seasons in the Second Division they dropped back down again.

Described as "an exceptionally skilful attacking right back", Forrest soon attracted attention from top clubs, with an offer of £200,000 from Sunderland being rejected. Eventually, Rotherham agreed to let him move on in December 1985 after Southampton of the First Division made an offer of £100,000, although Forrest was by now 28 years old.

At The Dell, Forrest soon justified manager Chris Nicholl's investment and made the step-up to top-flight football seamlessly. He was a cultured right back who was comfortable on the ball and strong in attack yet had great defensive abilities. He made his debut for "the Saints", when he took the place of Steve Baker in a 3–0 victory over Arsenal on 7 December 1985, retaining his place for the rest of the season.

Over the next three seasons, he rarely missed a game, until October 1988 when he was replaced by Ray Wallace in a 2–1 defeat by Sheffield Wednesday. Wallace's brothers Rod and Danny were established members of the Southampton side – this was the first time three brothers had played in the same team in the Football League First Division for 67 years.

Now in his early thirties, Forrest made only the occasional appearance until he sustained a serious knee injury against Wimbledon on 30 September 1989 which ended his career at Southampton. By the time that he had regained his fitness six months later, Jason Dodd was beginning to establish himself at right-back and with Aleksei Cherednik also on the books, Forrest was unable to get back into the team and was given a free transfer.

Forrest returned to Rotherham in August 1990 for one final season in League football before dropping down to the lower leagues with Gateshead.

== Coaching career ==
In 1992, Forrest joined the coaching staff at Darlington taking over the reins as caretaker manager in October 1993 (with Tim Parkin) when Billy McEwan was dismissed. Forrest and Parkin took charge of the first-team for four matches before Alan Murray took over permanently.

== Career statistics ==
Appearances and goals by club, season and competition
Club	Season	League			FA Cup		League Cup		Other		Total	
Club	Season	Division	Apps	Goals	Apps	Goals	Apps	Goals	Apps	Goals	Apps	Goals
Rotherham United
Rotherham United	1977–78	Third Division	44	0	4	0	4	0	—		52	0
Rotherham United	1978–79	Third Division	46	0	4	0	5	0	—		55	0
Rotherham United	1979–80	Third Division	43	4	3	0	4	0	—		50	4
Rotherham United	1980–81	Third Division	44	2	2	0	2	1	—		48	3
Rotherham United	1981–82	Second Division	35	1	1	0	4	0	3 (Note: Appearances in Group Cup)	0	43	1
Rotherham United	1982–83	Second Division	39	0	1	0	3	0	—		43	0
Rotherham United	1983–84	Third Division	45	0	5	0	6	0	1 (Note: Appearances in Associate Members' Cup)	0	57	0
Rotherham United	1984–85	Third Division	44	0	1	0	6	1	2	0	53	1
Rotherham United	1985–86	Third Division	17	1	1	0	2	0	—		20	1
Rotherham United	Total		357	8	22	0	36	2	6	0	421	10
Southampton
Southampton	1985–86	First Division	22	0	—		—		1 (Note: Appearances in Football League Super Cup)	0	23	0
Southampton	1986–87	First Division	38	0	1	0	7	0	1 (Note: Appearances in Full Members' Cup)	0	47	0
Southampton	1987–88	First Division	37	0	2	0	2	0	1	0	42	0
Southampton	1988–89	First Division	17	0	2	1	2	0	—		21	1
Southampton	1989–90	First Division	1	0	0	0	0	0	—		1	0
Southampton	Total		115	0	5	1	11	0	3	0	134	1
Rotherham United	1990–91	Third Division	34	0	6	0	4	0	3	0	47	0
Career total			506	8	33	1	51	2	12	0	602	11

== Honours ==
Rotherham United

- Football League Third Division: 1980–81
