= Steve Baker (footballer, born 1961) =

English footballer

Personal information
- Full name: Stephen Baker
- Date of birth: 2 December 1961 (age 64)
- Place of birth: Wallsend, England
- Height: 5 ft 5 in (1.65 m)
- Position: Full back

Youth career
- Wallsend Boys Club
- 1978–1979: Southampton

Senior career*
Years	Team	Apps	(Gls)
1979–1988	Southampton	73	(0)
1984	→ Burnley (loan)	10	(0)
1988–1991	Leyton Orient	112	(5)
1991	Bournemouth	6	(0)
1991–1992	Aldershot	0	(0)
1992–1997	Farnborough Town		
1997–????	Hayes		
????–2000	Aldershot Town		
2000–2002	Basingstoke Town		
- * Club domestic league appearances and goals

Stephen Baker (born 2 December 1961) is an English former professional association footballer who played as a defender.

== Football career ==
=== Southampton ===
Born in Wallsend, Baker was a member of the Wallsend Boys Club where he was spotted by scouts from First Division club, Southampton. After a trial, he joined the south coast club as an apprentice in July 1978, shortly after his 16th birthday, going on to sign a professional contract in December 1979. He made his debut for the reserves in March 1979, and for the next two seasons he shared the right-back position in the reserves with Manny Andruszewski, before making an "impressive" first team debut in the final game of the 1980–81 season at Ipswich Town on 13 May.

With Yugoslavia international Ivan Golac well established at right-back, Baker found first-team opportunities at The Dell rare, with only 20 appearances over the next three seasons, and in February 1984 he went on loan to Burnley, where he made ten Third Division appearances. He made his debut for Burnley in a 4–0 win over Lincoln City on 25 February 1984. Club manager John Bond made an offer to sign Baker on a permanent deal, but the bid was rejected by Southampton, and his loan spell was ended. By the start of the 1984–85 season, former England captain Mick Mills was now a permanent fixture at right-back, and Baker's few appearances came on the right wing. After Mills' departure, Golac returned briefly, before Baker regained the right-back position in September 1985. After a run of ten matches, new signing Gerry Forrest took over in December, with Baker again restricted to occasional appearances, often as a substitute.

In 1986–87, Baker managed a total of 26 league appearances, generally at inside-left, but was dropped following the signing of Gordon Hobson in November. In his final season at The Dell, Baker was only selected twice with his final appearance for "The Saints" coming in a South Coast Derby match against Portsmouth on 3 January 1988, when he had an "agonising afternoon", being beaten by Vince Hilaire who set up Barry Horne for the first goal, and then allowing Micky Quinn to get a cross in for Terry Connor to score Portsmouth's second.

In his eight years as a professional at Southampton, Baker managed 102 appearances in all competitions.

=== Later career ===
In March 1988, he was transferred to Leyton Orient of the Fourth Division for a fee of £50,000. Baker scored on his debut against Swansea City in March 1988 and made 135 league and cup appearances in three full seasons at the Brisbane Road club, featuring in every league game in the 1988–89 season including the playoff games, and helping them gain promotion to the Third Division in 1989. After a brief spell at Bournemouth in late 1991, he joined Aldershot in December before leaving in February, shortly before the club went out of business and were obliged to resign from the Football League.

He then joined Farnborough Town, where he stayed for over five years before periods with Hayes, Aldershot Town, and Basingstoke Town. He is one of only three players to play for both the original Aldershot F.C. and the reincarnated Aldershot Town, along with Steve Beeks and Colin Fielder.

== Career after football ==
Baker briefly worked for Southampton as a coach in their Academy and was later working as a statistician for the Professional Footballers' Association.

== Honours ==
Leyton Orient

- Football League Fourth Division play-offs: 1989
