= Keith Granger =

English footballer

Personal information
- Full name: Keith William Granger
- Date of birth: 5 October 1968 (age 58)
- Place of birth: Southampton, England
- Height: 5 ft 10 in (1.78 m)
- Position: Goalkeeper

Youth career
- 1982–1986: Southampton

Senior career*
| Years | Team | Apps | (Gls) |
| 1986–1987 | Southampton | 2 | (0) |
| 1987–1990 | Darlington | 23 | (0) |
| 1990–1991 | Basingstoke Town | | |
| 1990 | → Southampton (loan) | 0 | (0) |
| 1991 | Bashley | | |
| 1991 | Maidstone United | 0 | (0) |
| 1991–1993 | Newport (IOW) | | |
| 1993 | AFC Lymington | | |
| 1993–1994 | Farnborough Town | 3 | (0) |
- * Club domestic league appearances and goals

Keith William Granger (born 5 October 1968) is an English former footballer who played in the Football League as a goalkeeper for Southampton and Darlington.

He made his League debut for Southampton at 17, but played for them only twice before moving on to Darlington. Injury ended his League career after 25 appearances, although he was able to play on in non-league football until further injury forced his retirement at the age of 25. He later went into coaching.

== Early life and Southampton ==
Granger was born in Southampton and educated at the former Millbrook Secondary School. He joined Southampton as a schoolboy in December 1982 and became an apprentice in July 1985.

With two matches remaining in the 1985–86 Football League season, Southampton's England international goalkeeper Peter Shilton pulled a hamstring. The second choice goalkeeper, Phil Kite, was on loan at Middlesbrough, and Tim Flowers had returned to Wolverhampton Wanderers after a loan spell. Despite having never previously played for the reserves, the 17-year-old Granger made his debut on 3 May 1986, away to Everton; Southampton lost the match 6–1. In his second and what proved to be last match, at Tottenham Hotspur two days later, they lost 5–3.

In the summer of 1986, Flowers joined Southampton on a permanent transfer, leaving Granger as the third-choice keeper. Although Shilton left the Saints a year later, he was replaced by John Burridge. Granger signed a professional contract in October 1986 when he was 18, and between August 1986 and December 1987, he made 19 appearances for Southampton's reserve team.

== Darlington and non-league ==
Granger moved on to Darlington in December 1987, initially on loan until the end of the season, and signed a permanent contract in March 1988. He made 23 appearances for Darlington in the Fourth Division. In the second game of the 1988–89 season, he suffered a serious injury to his left knee which ended his League career. He underwent six operations over the next 20 months, but never regained full fitness.

He then returned to live in Southampton and played non-league football for Basingstoke Town, from where he rejoined Southampton in November 1990 on a month's loan as cover for the injured Ian Andrews. He played for a short time for several other clubs including Newport (Isle of Wight) and Farnborough Town, for whom he played three Southern League matches, two goalless draws and a 7–6 win. While playing for Farnborough against a Southampton XI, his knee was injured again, forcing his retirement as a player.

== Away from playing ==
He worked as a courier and as director of a sports development company, as well as coaching goalkeepers at former club Southampton and elsewhere. His coaching career has included spells in Scandinavia and Eastern Europe and with the Scotland under-16 team and the Football Association. In 2013, he joined the Matthew Le Tissier Natural Coaching team as goalkeeping coach.
