= Mark Blake (footballer, born 1967) =

English footballer

Personal information
- Full name: Mark Christopher Blake
- Date of birth: 17 December 1967 (age 58)
- Place of birth: Portsmouth, England
- Height: 6 ft 0 in (1.83 m)
- Position: Defender

Youth career
- 1984–1985: Southampton

Senior career*
| Years | Team | Apps | (Gls) |
| 1985–1990 | Southampton | 18 | (2) |
| 1989 | → Colchester United (loan) | 4 | (1) |
| 1990–1994 | Shrewsbury Town | 142 | (3) |
| 1994–1998 | Fulham | 137 | (17) |
| 1998–2000 | AS Cannes | 41 | (4) |
| 2000–2001 | Aldershot Town | 33 | (1) |
| 2001–2003 | Winchester City | | |

International career
| 1985 | England U17 | 4 | (2) |
| 1985–1986 | England Youth | 3 | (1) |
- * Club domestic league appearances and goals

Mark Christopher Blake (born 17 December 1967) is an English retired footballer, who played as a defender for Southampton, Colchester United, Shrewsbury Town, Fulham, AS Cannes and Aldershot Town. He made 301 appearances in The Football League, scoring 23 goals.

== Playing career ==
Blake started his career with Southampton, where he made 18 appearances in The Football League, scoring twice. He was loaned out to Colchester United in 1989. He then moved on to Shrewsbury Town in 1990, where he made 142 league appearances scoring three goals, during a four-year period. Blake then joined Fulham where he played 137 league appearances and scored 17 goals. He then moved on to AS Cannes and Aldershot Town.

== Non-playing career ==
He went on to become player-manager of Winchester City, winning the FA Vase, Wessex League and Wessex League Cup treble in 2003–04. Blake then had a role as head coach at Eastleigh, joining in January 2005, before stepping down in September 2006.

== Personal life ==
Blake was born in Portsmouth, Hampshire, and has a job in IT.

He has two children with his first marriage.

== Honours ==
Shrewsbury Town

- Football League Third Division: 1993–94

Fulham

- Football League Third Division runner-up: 1996–97

Winchester City

- FA Vase: 2003–04
