= Kevin Bond (English footballer) =

English association football player and manager

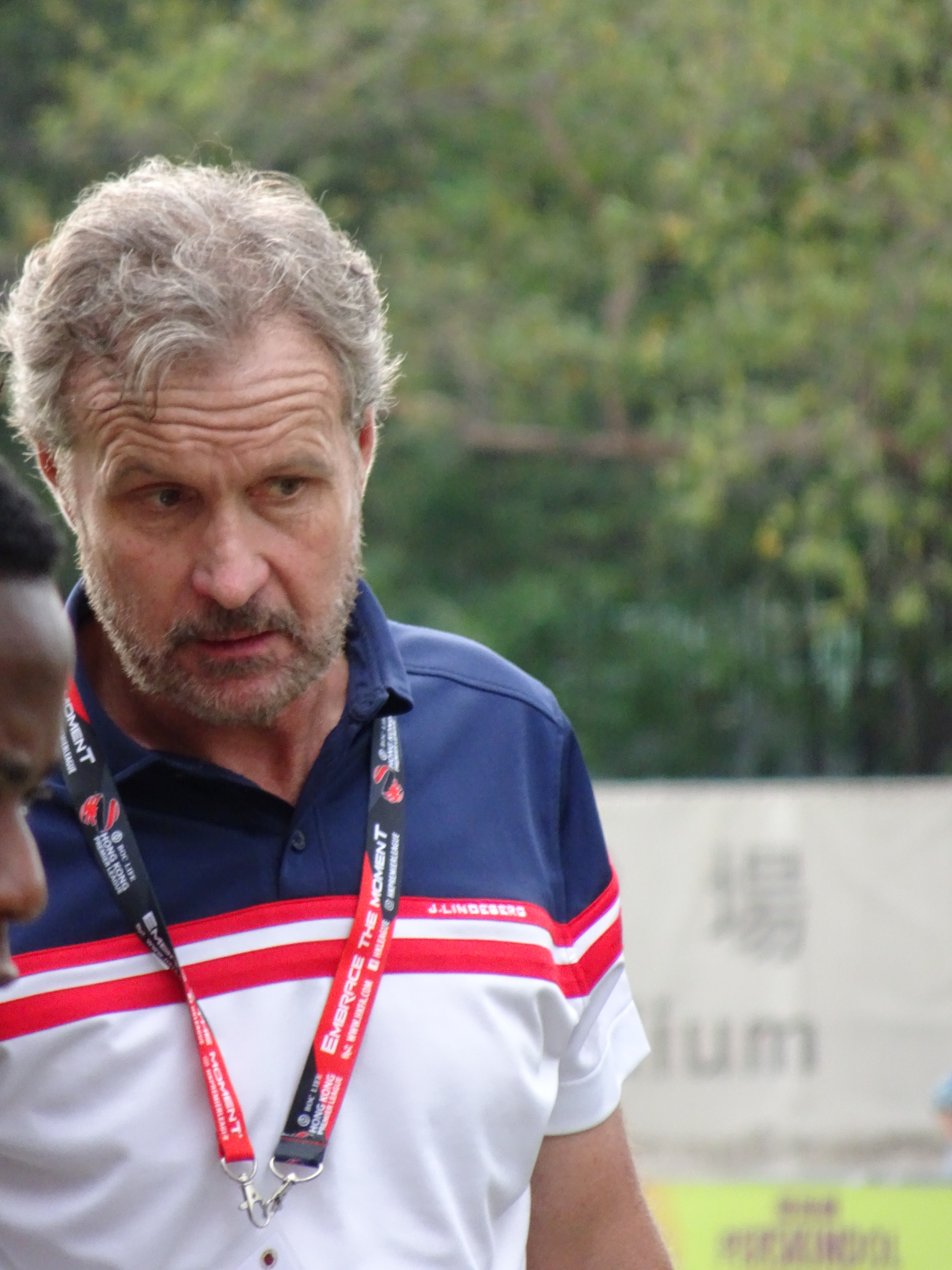
- Bond in 2017

Personal information
- Full name: Kevin John Bond
- Date of birth: 22 June 1957 (age 69)
- Place of birth: West Ham, London, England
- Height: 6 ft 0 in (1.83 m)
- Position: Centre back

Youth career
- 1972–1974: AFC Bournemouth
- 1974–1976: Norwich City

Senior career*
Years	Team	Apps	(Gls)
1976–1981	Norwich City	142	(12)
1981	Seattle Sounders	30	(16)
1981–1984	Manchester City	110	(11)
1984–1988	Southampton	140	(6)
1988–1992	AFC Bournemouth	126	(4)
1992–1994	Exeter City	19	(0)
1994–1995	Sittingbourne	2	(0)
1995–1996	Dover Athletic		

International career
1979–1980	England B	2	(0)

Managerial career
- 1997–1998: Stafford Rangers
- 2006–2008: AFC Bournemouth
- 2015: Queens Park Rangers (caretaker)
- 2016: Pegasus
- 2016–2017: Pegasus
- 2019: Southend United
- * Club domestic league appearances and goals

Kevin John Bond (born 22 June 1957) is an English professional football manager and former footballer who played as a centre back.

== Playing career ==
Bond was born in West Ham, London. He started his career as a trainee at AFC Bournemouth where his father, John Bond, was manager. When his father took up the manager's post at Norwich City he too made the move.

His league debut was made away to Leicester City in April 1976. 161 appearances followed generating fourteen goals and earning him two England B caps.

Wanting to try his luck abroad he had a brief spell in the NASL with the Seattle Sounders.

At the start of the 1981–82 season he was again reunited with his father at Manchester City. 110 games for the Maine Road side in the next three years resulted in a lucrative transfer to Southampton, where he spent four years, playing 140 games.

He was signed by former club Bournemouth, with whom he played 126 matches, before transferring to Exeter City, Sittingbourne and Dover Athletic where he finished his career.

== Managerial and coaching career ==
Bond began his coaching career as reserve team coach at former club Manchester City. Spells as coach at Wrexham and Altrincham followed, before Kevin followed his father into the managerial role when he took over at non league side Stafford Rangers in October 1997.

In early May 1998, Kevin was named as assistant manager to Alan Ball at Portsmouth. Following Ball's sacking, Bond became first a scout for West Ham United, and then returned to Portsmouth as reserve team coach under manager Harry Redknapp.

However, following Redknapp's resignation and subsequent appointment at rivals Southampton, Bond chose to return to his old club and was appointed as one of the coaches working under Redknapp. When then assistant Jim Smith's contract wasn't renewed following relegation, Bond took up the role. When Redknapp left Southampton to return once more to Portsmouth, Bond also chose to again follow him, but this time he was appointed assistant manager of the Fratton Park side.

On 1 June 2006, Bond left Portsmouth to join Newcastle United as assistant to Newcastle manager Glenn Roeder whom he had worked with previously at West Ham United. In July 2006 he completed his UEFA Pro Licence in coaching. Bonds' contract with Newcastle United was terminated on 26 September 2006 after allegations he was prepared to take bungs for players whilst at Portsmouth.

On 12 October 2006, Bond was appointed manager of Bournemouth, signing until the end of the season. Although Bournemouth lost the first five games of his reign, they avoided relegation and he was awarded a new contract.

A ten-point deduction for entering administration saw Bournemouth relegated to League Two at the end of the 2007–08 season, in spite of a run of five wins the last six games which nearly kept the club up. Bournemouth then had a further 17 points deducted for the 2008–09 season and Bond and his management team (Rob Newman and Eddie Howe) were dismissed by the Cherries on 1 September 2008 having only picked up two points from the first four matches of the season.

On 27 October 2008, Bond was re-united yet again with Harry Redknapp as assistant manager of Tottenham Hotspur. Following Redknapp's sacking in 2012, Bond left the club in June 2012.

In November 2012, Bond was once again re-united with Harry Redknapp, at Queens Park Rangers as their assistant manager. After Harry Redknapp departed and Chris Ramsey took over as head coach, Bond became First Team Coach. In February 2015, Bond was briefly caretaker manager at QPR.

In April 2016, Bond was appointed manager of Hong Kong Premier League club Pegasus, until the end of the season. Bond led Pegasus to a double cup win during his short stint as manager.

On 6 June 2016, Bond was appointed first-team coach of Aston Villa. He left the club on 13 October of the same year, along with Steve Clarke and Massimo Battara.

On 7 November 2016, it was announced that Bond would have a second tenure as Pegasus manager. He left his role as manager for a second time in June 2017 to reunite with Redknapp as an assistant at Birmingham City. His contract at Birmingham City was terminated on 16 September 2017.

He remained with Pegasus as a consultant.

On 2 April 2019, Bond was appointed as manager of Southend United until the end of the 2018–19 season. Southend, under Bond's managership, finished 19th in League One, successfully avoiding relegation on goal difference, following a win on the last day of the season against Sunderland.

After a run of six defeats at the start of the 2019–20 season, Bond resigned from his position of manager at Southend United on 6 September 2019.

In August 2021, Bond was appointed by Bristol Rovers to join Joey Barton's side as a first-team coach. Having helped the club to immediate promotion back to League One with a dramatic final-day victory over Scunthorpe United, Bond departed the club in October 2022. Following his departure, manager Barton explained the decision, stating that the club's coaching staff needed cutting down in order to streamline the approach to coaching. Following the sacking of Barton in October 2023, he returned to the club to assist interim manager Andy Mangan. Having remained on the coaching staff following the appointment of Matt Taylor, Bond was confirmed to have been given the role of first-team coach once again. He departed the club for a second time at the end of the 2023–24 season. On 26 December 2024, he returned to the club for a third spell following the appointment of Iñigo Calderón as new first-team head coach.

== Corruption allegations ==
On 20 September 2006, the Football Association announced that it was to investigate allegations "relating to players' agents and connected activities" concerning Kevin Bond, following a BBC Panorama special on corruption in football. Newcastle United placed him on gardening leave following the broadcast, and terminated his contract on 26 September, although no charges were brought against him, and Bond has denied the allegations.

== Managerial statistics ==
As of match played 3 September 2019

Managerial record by team and tenure
Team	From	To	Record					Ref.
Team	From	To	P	W	D	L	Win %	Ref.
AFC Bournemouth	12 October 2006	1 September 2008	95	31	17	47	32.6	
Queens Park Rangers (caretaker)	3 February 2015	12 February 2015	2	1	0	1	50.0	
Southend United	2 April 2019	6 September 2019	15	3	2	10	20.0	
Total			112	35	19	58	31.3	
