= Colin Clarke (footballer, born 1962) =

Northern Irish retired footballer

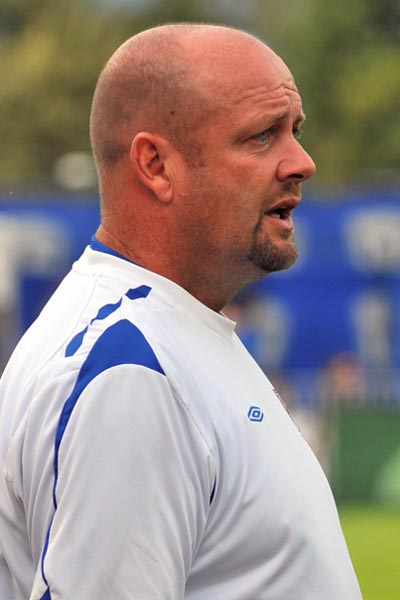
- Clarke in 2010

Personal information
- Full name: Colin John Clarke
- Date of birth: 30 October 1962 (age 63)
- Place of birth: Newry, Northern Ireland
- Height: 5 ft 11 in (1.80 m)
- Position: Forward

Youth career
- –1980: Ipswich Town

Senior career*
Years	Team	Apps	(Gls)
1980–1981	Ipswich Town	0	(0)
1981–1984	Peterborough United	82	(18)
1984	→ Gillingham (loan)	8	(1)
1984–1985	Tranmere Rovers	45	(22)
1985–1986	AFC Bournemouth	46	(26)
1986–1989	Southampton	82	(36)
1988	→ AFC Bournemouth (loan)	4	(2)
1989–1990	Queens Park Rangers	46	(11)
1990–1993	Portsmouth	85	(18)
Total		398	(134)

International career
1986–1992	Northern Ireland	38	(13)

Managerial career
- 1998–1999: Richmond Kickers
- 2000: San Diego Flash
- 2003–2006: FC Dallas
- 2007: Virginia Beach Mariners
- 2007–2011: Puerto Rico Islanders
- 2008–2011: Puerto Rico (National team)
- 2011–2018: North Carolina FC
- * Club domestic league appearances and goals

Colin John Clarke (born 30 October 1962) is a Northern Irish retired footballer who played as a forward, and a former head coach.

He played for seven English clubs between 1981 and 1993 before retiring through a knee injury, and scored 13 goals in 38 matches for the Northern Ireland national football team from 1986 to 1993. A member of their squad at the 1986 FIFA World Cup, he was joint with Billy Gillespie as Northern Ireland's top scorer of all before their record was surpassed by David Healy.

After retiring as a player, Clarke went into management in the United States, coaching teams including Major League Soccer franchise FC Dallas and the Puerto Rico national football team.

== Playing career ==
Born in Newry, Clarke began his professional career in the Football League Fourth Division at Peterborough United in the 1981–82 season, scoring 18 goals in 84 games over the next three seasons (having a loan spell at Gillingham during his final season at London Road) before he signed for their Fourth Division rivals Tranmere Rovers.

Along with fellow striker John Clayton, he formed one of the deadliest strike-forces in the Football League by scoring 22 goals that season, but the 1984–85 campaign ended in disappointment as Tranmere just missed out on promotion. He was then transferred to Third Division club AFC Bournemouth and scored 26 goals, though again his goals were not enough to win his club promotion.

In the summer of 1986, Clarke made the big move of his career in a transfer to First Division club Southampton for £500,000, and he was an instant success in his first campaign as a top division striker with 20 league goals, including two hat-tricks in the first few weeks of the season. The Saints reached the semi-finals of the Football League Cup that season. He enjoyed another successful campaign a year later by scoring 16 goals, but a sudden loss of form in 1988–89 restricted him to nine First Division games (in which he failed to score).

He was loaned back to Bournemouth (by then in the Second Division) during that campaign and scored twice in four games before a permanent exit from The Dell in March 1989, saw him resume his First Division career with Queens Park Rangers (QPR). He scored five goals in 12 games as QPR finished ninth, but his goalscoring rate slowed in 1989–90 as he managed just six goals in 34 games in a season where QPR finished lower and underwent a mid season managerial change when Trevor Francis was succeeded by Don Howe.

He was transferred to Portsmouth in June 1990, where he remained until the end of his playing career three years later. During his time at Fratton Park he was in the side that reached the FA Cup semi-finals in 1992, only being eliminated by Liverpool after a replay and penalties, and narrowly missed out on promotion to the Premier League a year later. He retired at the end of the 1992–93 season due to a knee injury.

=== International career ===
Like many players from Northern Ireland Colin Clarke's greatest playing days came in a Northern Ireland shirt, for whom he scored 13 goals (second behind David Healy) in 38 appearances. Clarke joined the National Team set up just as arguably the greatest Northern Ireland team of all time was breaking up. He made his international debut in a pre-Mexico World Cup warm-up match against France in February 1986 and scored his first Northern Ireland goal against Morocco on his third appearance. In Mexico he appeared in all of Northern Ireland's matches, scoring a consolation against Spain, but the team were unable to match the heights they had reached at the 1982 World Cup.

After returning from the Mexico World Cup, many of Northern Ireland's star players retired or were at least in the veteran stage. Team manager Billy Bingham set about building a new team with Clarke as the spearhead. Although this new team failed to reach the heights of Bingham's first, Clarke did have some notable highlights. In September 1991, against the Faroe Islands he became the first Northern Ireland player to score a hat-trick in international football since George Best in 1971. He scored his then record-breaking thirteenth Northern Ireland goal against Albania in September 1992 and played his final international match two months later against Denmark.

=== International goals ===
Scores and results list Northern Ireland's goal tally first.

#	Date	Venue	Opponent	Score	Result	Competition
1	23 April 1986	Windsor Park, Belfast, Northern Ireland	Morocco	1–0	2–1	Friendly match
2	7 June 1986	Estadio Tres de Marzo, Guadalajara, Mexico	Spain	1–2	1–2	1986 FIFA World Cup
3	29 April 1987	Windsor Park, Belfast, Northern Ireland	Yugoslavia	1–0	1–2	UEFA Euro 1988 qualifying
4	17 February 1988	Olympic Stadium, Athens, Greece	Greece	1–0	2–3	Friendly match
5	17 February 1988	Olympic Stadium, Athens, Greece	Greece	2–3	2–3	Friendly match
6	21 May 1988	Windsor Park, Belfast, Northern Ireland	Malta	3–0	3–0	1990 FIFA World Cup qualification
7	26 April 1989	Ta' Qali National Stadium, Ta'Qali, Malta	Malta	1–0	2–0	1990 FIFA World Cup qualification
8	17 October 1990	Windsor Park, Belfast, Northern Ireland	Denmark	1–1	1–1	UEFA Euro 1992 qualifying
9	1 May 1991	Windsor Park, Belfast, Northern Ireland	Faroe Islands	1–0	1–1	UEFA Euro 1992 qualifying
10	11 September 1991	Landskrona IP, Landskrona, Sweden	Faroe Islands	2–0	5–0	UEFA Euro 1992 qualifying
11	11 September 1991	Landskrona IP, Landskrona, Sweden	Faroe Islands	4–0	5–0	UEFA Euro 1992 qualifying
12	11 September 1991	Landskrona IP, Landskrona, Sweden	Faroe Islands	5–0	5–0	UEFA Euro 1992 qualifying
13	9 September 1992	Windsor Park, Belfast, Northern Ireland	Albania	1–0	3–0	1994 FIFA World Cup qualification

== Coaching and management career ==
Clarke was appointed interim coach during the latter half of the 2003 MLS season as a replacement for Mike Jeffries, and was appointed full-time to the position for the 2004 season. Clarke went on to manage both the 2005 and 2006 seasons with great regular season form indeed FC Dallas won the Western Conference comfortably in 2006, but was eliminated in the play-offs in both years latterly after a penalty shoot out. This led to his sacking on 7 November 2006. Before being appointed head coach, Clarke was an assistant coach for the Burn. He spent two seasons as head coach of the Richmond Kickers of the United States' A-League. During that time, he compiled a 38–18 record. On 13 December 1999, he was named head coach of the San Diego Flash, a position he held for one season. Clarke was appointed head coach at Virginia Beach Mariners in January 2007. Within two months of his arrival, the club folded and Clarke was again without a job.

=== Puerto Rico Islanders ===
On 22 May 2007, Puerto Rico Islanders appointed Clarke to replace Toribio Rojas as head coach midway through the team's worst season since their creation. During the last half of the 2007 season he turned the squad's fortunes around and managed to cling to the sixth spot in the table, guaranteeing a playoff berth. The squad would make it all the way to the semi-finals where they lost to Seattle Sounders on penalty kicks. Late in 2007 he also took the Islanders to the CFU Club Championship semi-finals, the Caribbean qualifiers for the 2008 CONCACAF Champions Cup, where they lost 1–0 to Joe Public F.C. of Trinidad and Tobago.

Despite a bad start to the 2008 season, Clarke managed to lead the team into the CONCACAF Champions League by winning a two-game series on 1:0 aggregate against fellow 2007 CFU Club Championship semi-finalist San Juan Jabloteh for the tournament's Caribbean third place spot. After several bad results at the start of the season, Clarke managed to push the Islanders into an undefeated run that would lead the team its first league trophy, Commissioner's Cup, after they ended the regular season in first place. The team would make it all the way to the finals, but lost to second seed Vancouver Whitecaps 2:1.

=== Puerto Rico national team ===
In January 2008, Clarke was chosen to lead the Puerto Rico national team. After two wins against Bermuda and a draw versus Trinidad and Tobago was popular with many Puerto Rican football fans. On 4 June, he led the national team to a disappointing 4–0 defeat against Honduras. However, on 14 June, Puerto Rico played against Honduras in the second leg earning a 2–2 draw in Puerto Rico.

In Puerto Rico he was known as "El General" ("The General").

=== North Carolina FC ===
On 6 December 2011, the Carolina RailHawks of the North American Soccer League, now known as North Carolina FC and playing in the United Soccer League, announced that Clarke would replace Martin Rennie as the team's head coach.

After amassing a 91–84–58 record over seven seasons, North Carolina FC announced on 17 October 2018 that it would part ways with Clarke.
