= Phil Kite (footballer) =

English footballer (born 1962)

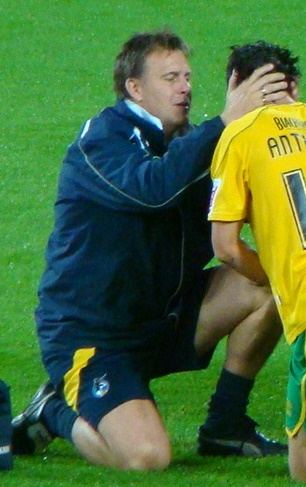
- Phil Kite attending to an injured Byron Anthony

Personal information
- Full name: Philip Kite
- Date of birth: 26 October 1962 (age 64)
- Place of birth: Bristol, England
- Height: 6 ft 2 in (1.88 m)
- Position: Goalkeeper

Youth career
- 1979–1980: Bristol Rovers

Senior career*
Years	Team	Apps	(Gls)
1980–1984	Bristol Rovers	96	(0)
1984	→ Tottenham Hotspur (loan)	0	(0)
1984–1987	Southampton	4	(0)
1986	→ Middlesbrough (loan)	2	(0)
1987–1989	Gillingham	70	(0)
1989–1990	AFC Bournemouth	7	(0)
1990–1993	Sheffield United	11	(0)
1991	→ Mansfield Town (loan)	11	(0)
1992	→ Plymouth Argyle (loan)	2	(0)
1992	→ Rotherham United (loan)	1	(0)
1992	→ Crewe Alexandra (loan)	5	(0)
1993	→ Stockport County (loan)	5	(0)
1993–1994	Cardiff City	18	(0)
1994–1996	Bristol City	6	(0)
Total		238	(0)

International career
1978–1979	England Schoolboys		
1981	England Youth	5	(0)
- * Club domestic league appearances and goals

Phil Kite (born 26 October 1962) is a former football goalkeeper, goalkeeping coach and physiotherapist. He retired in 2015 from his role as physio at Bristol Rovers, the club he supported as a boy.

== Playing career ==
Born in Bristol, England, Kite joined Bristol Rovers as an apprentice goalkeeper in 1979, and signed his first professional contract on his 18th birthday in October 1980. After making 96 league appearances for Rovers, he moved on to Southampton. He went on to make league appearances for thirteen different clubs, but missed a large amount of playing time through injury, and only a two-year spell at Gillingham saw him play regularly as an established first-choice keeper. In 1996, he left Bristol City to re-join his first club, Bristol Rovers, as physio, goalkeeping coach and backup goalkeeper.

== Physio career ==
Kite began studying towards his physiotherapy qualification in 1991 and completed his studies in 1995. Since re-joining Bristol Rovers he has retired from playing, and relinquished his coaching duties to Steve Book. He worked exclusively as the club's physio until 2015 when he announced his retirement. His final game serving Rovers was the 2015 Conference Premier play-off final at Wembley Stadium. As a thank you for Kite's 24 years of combined service to Bristol Rovers, he was granted a testimonial to be played against West Bromwich Albion, managed by Kite's good friend and former Rovers player Tony Pulis.
