= Glenn Cockerill =

English footballer & manager (born 1959)

Personal information
- Date of birth: 25 August 1959 (age 67)
- Place of birth: Grimsby, Lincolnshire, England
- Height: 6 ft 0 in (1.83 m)
- Position: Midfielder

Senior career*
Years	Team	Apps	(Gls)
1976–1979	Lincoln City	71	(10)
1979–1981	Swindon Town	26	(1)
1981–1984	Lincoln City	115	(25)
1984–1985	Sheffield United	62	(10)
1985–1993	Southampton	287	(32)
1993–1996	Leyton Orient	90	(7)
1996–1997	Fulham	40	(1)
1997–1998	Brentford	23	(0)
Total		714	(86)

Managerial career
- 2002–2007: Woking
- 2010: Winchester City
- * Club domestic league appearances and goals

Glenn Cockerill (born 25 August 1959) is an English retired footballer who played more than 700 games in The Football League in a 22-year career. He was a skilled central midfielder renowned for his passing and shooting skills.

== Playing career ==
Cockerill began his career at non-league Louth United, making a goalscoring debut for the first team in their 1–1 home Midland League draw with Mexborough Town on 9 March 1976. He would go on to score five times in seven league appearances in his debut season. He attracted the attention of Lincoln City when, after scoring two goals in a 3–3 FA Youth Cup draw with the club on 15 September 1976, he signed Northern Intermediate League forms with the Sincil Bank based club as part of a trial period. The trial was successful leading to him joining the club as a professional in November after agreeing a two-year contract with a year's option. He made his Football League debut for the club as a 70th minute substitute for John Ward in the club's 5–4 home victory over Northampton Town on 5 February 1977.

In November 1979, he joined Swindon Town for a club record fee of £111,000. He returned to Lincoln City in July 1981, moving on to join Sheffield United for a fee of £120,000 in March 1984. He later joined Southampton in October 1985. He left the Saints in December 1993, having made 358 appearances for the club in all competitions, and later spent three seasons at Leyton Orient, before finishing his career with spells at Fulham and Brentford.

In 1988, while playing for Southampton, Cockerill was punched in the face by Paul Davis of Arsenal, breaking his jaw. Although the referee failed to spot the incident, Davis subsequently received a nine-match ban and a £3,000 fine.

== Managerial and coaching career ==
In 2002, Cockerill was appointed manager of Conference side Woking. He spent five seasons as manager at Kingfield, before being relieved of his duties in March 2007. He is now semi-retired.

In August 2008 Brighton and Hove Albion manager Micky Adams added Cockerill to his scouting network.

On 4 April 2010, he was appointed manager of Winchester City of the Wessex League although he remained in charge for only a few months, parting company with Winchester by mutual consent in September 2010.

== Personal life ==
He is the son of Ron and brother of John Cockerill, both also professional footballers.

== Career statistics ==
Appearances and goals by club, season and competition
Club	Season	League			FA Cup		League Cup		Other		Total	
Club	Season	Division	Apps	Goals	Apps	Goals	Apps	Goals	Apps	Goals	Apps	Goals
Lincoln City	1976–77	Third Division	4	0	0	0	0	0	—		4	0
Lincoln City	1977–78	Third Division	13	1	1	0	0	0	—		14	1
Lincoln City	1978–79	Third Division	35	6	0	0	0	0	—		35	6
Lincoln City	1979–80	Fourth Division	19	3	1	0	2	0	—		22	3
Lincoln City	Total		71	10	2	0	2	0	0	0	75	10
Swindon Town	1979–80	Third Division	10	1	0	0	0	0	—		10	1
Swindon Town	1980–81	Third Division	16	0	0	0	3	0	—		19	0
Swindon Town	Total		26	1	0	0	3	0	0	0	29	1
Lincoln City	1981–82	Third Division	44	11	3	0	6	0	3 (Note: Appearances in Group Cup)	0	56	11
Lincoln City	1982–83	Third Division	38	8	1	0	6	0	5	4	50	12
Lincoln City	1983–84	Third Division	33	6	3	0	4	0	1 (Note: Appearances in EFL Trophy)	0	41	6
Lincoln City	Total		115	25	7	0	16	0	9	4	147	29
Sheffield United	1983–84	Third Division	10	1	0	0	0	0	—		10	1
Sheffield United	1984–85	Second Division	40	7	1	0	2	0	—		43	7
Sheffield United	1985–86	Second Division	12	2	0	0	4	1	—		16	3
Sheffield United	Total		62	10	1	0	6	1	0	0	69	11
Southampton	1985–86	First Division	30	7	6	2	0	0	2 (Note: Appearances in Super Cup)	0	38	9
Southampton	1986–87	First Division	42	7	1	0	8	0	2 (Note: Appearances in Full Members' Cup)	0	53	7
Southampton	1987–88	First Division	39	2	1	0	2	0	1	0	43	2
Southampton	1988–89	First Division	34	6	1	0	5	2	2	0	42	8
Southampton	1989–90	First Division	36	4	3	0	7	1	—		46	5
Southampton	1990–91	First Division	32	2	3	0	5	0	2	0	42	2
Southampton	1991–92	First Division	37	4	6	0	6	2	3	0	52	4
Southampton	1992–93	Premier League	23	0	1	0	2	0	—		26	0
Southampton	1993–94	Premier League	14	0	0	0	2	0	—		16	0
Southampton	Total		287	32	22	2	37	5	12	0	358	39
Leyton Orient	1993–94	Second Division	19	2	0	0	0	0	3	0	22	2
Leyton Orient	1994–95	Second Division	33	4	2	0	2	1	6	0	43	5
Leyton Orient	1995–96	Third Division	38	1	1	0	2	0	1	0	42	1
Leyton Orient	Total		90	7	3	0	4	1	10	0	107	8
Fulham	1996–97	Third Division	32	1	1	0	3	0	—		36	1
Fulham	1997–98	Second Division	8	0	0	0	3	0	—		11	0
Fulham	Total		40	1	1	0	6	0	0	0	47	1
Brentford	1997–98	Second Division	23	0	2	0	0	0	—		25	0
Career total			714	86	38	2	74	7	31	4	857	99

== Honours ==
Southampton

- Full Members' Cup runner-up: 1991–92
