= Danny Wallace (footballer) =

English footballer (born 1964)

Personal information
- Full name: David Lloyd Wallace
- Date of birth: 21 January 1964 (age 62)
- Place of birth: Greenwich, England
- Height: 5 ft 4 in (1.63 m)
- Positions: Striker; winger

Youth career
- –1977: Deal Town
- 1977–1980: Southampton

Senior career*
Years	Team	Apps	(Gls)
1980–1989	Southampton	253	(64)
1989–1993	Manchester United	47	(6)
1993	→ Millwall (loan)	3	(0)
1993–1995	Birmingham City	16	(2)
1995	Wycombe Wanderers	1	(0)
Total		320	(72)

International career
1981	England Youth	4	(5)
1981	England U20	5	(0)
1983–1986	England U21	14	(1)
1986	England	1	(1)
1990	England B	1	(1)
- * Club domestic league appearances and goals

David Lloyd "Danny" Wallace (born 21 January 1964) is an English former professional footballer who played as a striker and winger. During his career, he played for Southampton, Manchester United, Millwall, Birmingham City and Wycombe Wanderers. He won one full cap for England. His football career was ended prematurely by the effects of multiple sclerosis.

== Club career ==
=== Southampton ===
Wallace was born in Greenwich, south-east London. As a youngster, his skills attracted scouts from many London clubs, including Millwall and Arsenal, but he was snapped up by Southampton, joining them as an associate schoolboy in February 1977. He turned professional in January 1982, although he had made his first team debut more than a year earlier.

He made his debut aged only 16 years and 313 days on 29 November 1980 at Old Trafford, thus becoming the youngest player to be picked for Southampton – a record that would remain unbroken until Theo Walcott made his debut 25 years later.

Over the next two seasons, his first-team appearances were limited, and he made only three starts (plus four substitute appearances) in the 1981–82 season. On 23 October 1982, he scored his first goal for the Saints in a 3–2 defeat at Swansea City. This was the start of a scoring spree of seven goals in ten games, which saw him finish the 1982–83 season with 12 goals from 35 appearances.

Small, compact and explosive, Wallace delighted The Dell crowds with his pace and superb individual goals. Most First Division defences struggled to cope with his speed and ability. He burst to national prominence with both goals in the first match televised live from The Dell, against Liverpool on 16 March 1984, by which time Southampton were a major threat to Liverpool's bid for a third successive league title. His first goal was an overhead kick, while his second saw himself to head home a cross from Mark Dennis. The first goal was named Goal of the Season for 1983–84. Southampton had emerged as surprise contenders in the title race, but in the end Liverpool won the title and Southampton finished second – their highest-ever finish. They had also emerged as unlikely contenders for the double, but were beaten 1–0 in extra time by eventual winners Everton in the FA Cup semi-final.

Wallace's fine form continued, and the following month both he and Steve Moran scored hat-tricks in an 8–2 win over Coventry City. Southampton had another strong season in the league, finishing fifth, but were unable to compete in the UEFA Cup the following season as the Heysel disaster resulted in English clubs receiving an indefinite ban from European competition.

In the league, Wallace scored eight goals in 35 games in the 1985–86 season and reached double figures again in 1987–88 with 11 league goals.

On 22 October 1988, his two brothers, Rod and Ray, joined him in the team in a match at The Dell against Sheffield Wednesday; this was the first time three brothers had played in the same team in English professional top-flight football since 1920. The three brothers continued to play together for the remainder of the 1988–89 season, with Danny and Rod playing in attack alongside Alan Shearer and Matthew Le Tissier.

By this time, Wallace was growing restless at Southampton and was looking for a new club. He attracted interest from many of the top clubs, and in September 1989 he eventually departed for Manchester United for £1.2 million, then a record fee for a Southampton player. In all, he made 317 first-team appearances for Southampton, scoring 79 goals.

=== Manchester United ===
He joined Manchester United at a time when Alex Ferguson was still looking for his first trophy as manager of Manchester United three years after taking charge. United had not won the league title since 1967, and when Ferguson had taken over in November 1986 he inherited a squad which had won two FA Cups under Ron Atkinson but was soon being broken up, with many players being sold, while a few including Bryan Robson and Mark Hughes remained an integral part of Ferguson's plans to take United a step further, with the major signings of this era including Brian McClair, Steve Bruce and Neil Webb.

After the departure of Jesper Olsen in November 1988, he had drafted in Scotsman Ralph Milne, but the player was hugely disappointing and Ferguson quickly decided that he needed a more talented player to fill this position. 18-year-old Lee Sharpe had started the season as United's first choice left winger, but Ferguson wanted a more experienced player for this position and seemed to have found what he was looking for in Wallace. One of his first appearances for United was a 5–1 league defeat to Manchester City in the Manchester derby at Maine Road.

Wallace was never quite the player at United that he had been at Southampton, although he remained their first choice left winger in 1989–90 and was chosen for the FA Cup final against Crystal Palace, which United won 1–0 in the replay after a 3–3 draw. However, 1990–91 saw first team opportunities reduced when Sharpe ousted Wallace as the first choice left winger at Old Trafford, though he still managed his fair share of appearances; on 28 November 1990 he scored one goal and was involved in four others in United's 6–2 away victory over Arsenal in the Football League Cup fourth round, although it was 19-year-old Sharpe who made the headlines with a hat-trick.

United reached the final of that competition on 21 April 1991 but suffered a shock defeat to Sheffield Wednesday and Wallace was not included in the squad. He did, however, make the squad for the Cup Winners' Cup final, collecting a winner's medal as a non-playing substitute.

But in 1991–92, Ryan Giggs burst onto the scene and Wallace was now firmly out of the first team picture, failing to make a single appearance in the league all season as United came second to Leeds United after leading the table for most of the season. In December 1991, he was put on the transfer list and held talks with manager Ian Branfoot about a potential return to Southampton, but the return to The Dell never happened.

Wallace was selected twice for United in their first season in the new FA Premier League, and scored for them against Brighton & Hove Albion in a League Cup tie. A loan spell at Millwall followed.

=== Birmingham City and Wycombe Wanderers ===
After a series of injuries and a puzzling loss of form which meant he rarely played during his last two years at Manchester United, he was sold to Birmingham City for £250,000. It became obvious that the player was far from fit, and in March 1995 he made a free-transfer move to Wycombe Wanderers where he made just one substitute appearance before ending his playing career.

== International career ==
Wallace was capped by England at under-age levels, including 14 appearances for the under-21 team. He was selected in the England senior squad on 29 January 1986 for a friendly against Egypt in Cairo. He scored in a 4–0 win but was never selected for the England senior side again. He played in a B international in 1990.

== Personal life ==
The reason for his problems was discovered in 1996 when he was diagnosed with multiple sclerosis and he was forced to retire from football.

On 17 May 2004, St Mary's Stadium hosted a testimonial match for Wallace, featuring a Southampton XI vs an All-Star XI, organised by his former Southampton teammate George Lawrence. Other former Saints teammates playing in the match included Steve Williams, Steve Moran, Mark Wright and his two younger twin brothers, Rodney and Raymond. Manchester United were preparing for the FA Cup Final, to be played five days later, but several of Wallace's former United teammates also turned out, including Mark Hughes, Denis Irwin, Paul Ince, Paul Parker and Viv Anderson.

In 2006, Wallace completed the 42.195-kilometre (26.219 mi) London Marathon in five-and-a-half days. His goal in completing the marathon was to raise money for the Danny Wallace Foundation, which provides aid for those with multiple sclerosis. He was greeted at the finish line by former boxer Michael Watson, who himself completed the marathon in seven days after suffering brain injuries in a 1991 boxing match.

== Honours ==
Southampton

- Football League First Division runner-up: 1983–84

Manchester United

- FA Cup: 1989–90
- FA Charity Shield: 1990
- European Cup Winners' Cup: 1990–91
