= Nick Holmes (footballer) =

English footballer (born 1954)

Personal information
- Full name: Nicholas Charles Holmes
- Date of birth: 11 November 1954 (age 71)
- Place of birth: Southampton, England
- Height: 5 ft 11 in (1.80 m)
- Positions: Full-back; midfielder

Senior career*
Years	Team	Apps	(Gls)
1972–1987	Southampton	444	(56)
1987–1988	East Cowes Victoria		

Managerial career
- 2002–2009: Salisbury City
- * Club domestic league appearances and goals

Nicholas Charles Holmes (born 11 November 1954) is an English former professional footballer. He spent the majority of his playing career with Southampton, where he won the FA Cup Final in 1976. In 1987, he joined East Cowes Victoria for a season before retiring. From July 2002 to July 2009, Holmes was manager of Salisbury City.

== Early life ==
Holmes was born in Woolston, Southampton and educated at St. Mary's College.

== Club career ==
=== Southampton ===
Holmes was an apprentice with Southampton in the early 1970s. He made his first team debut on 2 March 1974 away to Arsenal. A natural left-sided player, he was equally at home at full-back, midfield, centre-back or sweeper. Holmes spent 14 years at The Dell. Naturally left-sided, he could play at left-back or midfield and was a thoughtful, yet thrusting, player who was as reliable as he was skilful.

He played at left-midfield in the 1976 FA Cup Final against Manchester United which Saints won 1–0, and also played and scored in the 1979 League Cup final against Nottingham Forest, which was lost 2–3. Between these two Wembley appearances, he was an integral member of the Southampton team that gained promotion from Division 2 at the end of the 1977–78 season. He became club captain in March 1980.

On 16 August 1986, Saints recognised his loyalty by awarding him a testimonial match against John Mortimore's Benfica, which was won 4–1, with Holmes scoring one of the goals.

His last appearance for Southampton was on 14 Feb 1987 at Tottenham Hotspur. A pelvic injury forced him to retire from the game in May 1987, by which time only Terry Paine and Mick Channon had made more appearances for the Saints. In total, he played 543 times for Southampton, scoring 64 goals.

=== After Southampton ===
After leaving Saints, he spent the 1987–88 season with East Cowes Vics, and participated in a charity match against some of the stars from BBC soap opera EastEnders who played under the name Walford Boys Club. Following his spell at East Cowes Vics, he spent a season as coach back at Southampton working with manager Chris Nicholl.

=== Salisbury City ===
In July 2002, he was tempted back into football when he was offered the manager's job at Salisbury City. Under Holmes' management, Salisbury gained promotion to the Conference South in the 2005–06 season by finishing top of the Southern League Premier Division, followed by winning the play-off final in the 2006–07 season to participate in the Conference Premier in 2007–08.

In January 2008, following the departure of George Burley, Holmes was linked with a return to Southampton as manager. Although he was not offered the job, Holmes stated that Southampton was "the only club I'd leave Salisbury for". He became Salisbury's general manager in July 2009, with Tommy Widdrington taking control of the first team. Holmes left Salisbury on 14 July 2010 by mutual consent.

== Honours ==
=== As a player ===
Southampton

- FA Cup: 1975–76
- Football League Cup runner-up: 1978–79

=== As a manager ===
Salisbury City

- Southern League Premier Division: 2005–06
- Conference South play-offs: 2007
