= 1979–80 Wolverhampton Wanderers F.C. season =

English football club season

Wolverhampton Wanderers
1979–80 season
- Chairman: Harry Marshall
- Manager: John Barnwell
- Stadium: Molineux
- Football League First Division: 6th
- League Cup: Winners
- FA Cup: Fifth round
- Top goalscorer: League: John Richards (13); All: John Richards (18)
- Highest home attendance: 41,031 v Swindon Town (League Cup, 12 February 1980)
- Lowest home attendance: 15,807 v Brighton & Hove Albion (Division One, 21 December 1979)
- Average home league attendance: 25,731
- Biggest win: 4–0 v Norwich City (A), Division One, 23 February 1980
- Biggest defeat: 0–3 v Liverpool (A), Division One, 3 November 1979; 0–3 v Coventry City (H), Division One, 17 November 1979; 0–3 v Leeds United (A), Division One, 15 December 1979; 0–3 v Watford (H), FA Cup, 16 February 1980; 0–3 v Brighton & Hove Albion (A), Division One, 8 April 1980

The 1979–80 season was the 81st of competitive league football in the history of Wolverhampton Wanderers. They finished 6th in the First Division and won the League Cup for the second time, beating holders Nottingham Forest 1–0 in the final. The winning goal was scored by Scottish international forward Andy Gray, who had joined the club from Aston Villa on 8 September 1979 for a then-record British transfer fee of £1,469,000. This broke the previous record, set just a few days earlier, when Wolves sold midfielder Steve Daley to Manchester City for £1,437,500.

The season was also notable for the opening of the new John Ireland Stand at Molineux, the high cost of which created debts that contributed to financial turmoil and near-liquidation for the club later in the decade.

== Squad ==
Substitute appearances indicated in brackets

Pos.	Nat.	Name	League		League Cup		FA Cup		Total	
Pos.	Nat.	Name	Apps	Goals	Apps	Goals	Apps	Goals	Apps	Goals
GK	ENG	Paul Bradshaw	37	0	11	0	3	0	51	0
GK	IRE	Mick Kearns	5	0	0	0	1	0	6	0
DF	IRE	Hugh Atkinson	5(2)	1	0	0	0	0	5(2)	1
DF	WAL	George Berry	41	0	11	0	4	2	56	2
DF	ENG	Colin Brazier	16(4)	1	0(3)	0	1	0	17(7)	1
DF	ENG	Bobby Coy	0	0	0	0	0	0	0	0
DF	ENG	Gary Cutler	0	0	0	0	0	0	0	0
DF	ENG	Mike Hollifield	0	0	0	0	0	0	0	0
DF	ENG	Emlyn Hughes	33(2)	0	10	0	3	0	46(2)	0
DF	ENG	John Humphrey	2	0	0	0	0	0	2	0
DF	ENG	John McAlle	8	0	2	0	1(1)	0	11(1)	0
DF	ENG	Geoff Palmer	40	1	11	2	4	0	55	3
DF	ENG	Derek Parkin	40	0	11	0	3	0	54	0
DF	SCO	Ian Ross	0	0	0	0	0	0	0	0
MF	ENG	Ian Arkwright	0	0	0	0	0	0	0	0
MF	SCO	John Black	0	0	0	0	0	0	0	0
MF	ENG	David Butler	0	0	0	0	0	0	0	0
MF	SCO	Willie Carr	40	2	11	1	4	1	55	4
MF	ENG	Peter Daniel	37	6	10	1	4	0	51	7
MF	ENG	Kenny Hibbitt	32	9	11	4	4	0	47	13
MF	ENG	Mick Matthews	0	0	0	0	0	0	0	0
MF	ENG	Craig Moss	1	0	0	0	0	0	1	0
MF	ENG	Martin Patching	5	0	2	0	0	0	7	0
MF	ENG	Dave Thomas	10	0	4	0	1	0	15	0
MF	URU	Rafael Villazán	0	0	0	0	0	0	0	0
FW	ENG	Norman Bell	2(3)	3	0	0	0	0	2(3)	3
FW	ENG	Wayne Clarke	13(3)	2	3	0	0(1)	0	16(4)	2
FW	ENG	Mel Eves	27(4)	6	5(1)	2	3	1	35(5)	9
FW	SCO	Andy Gray	35	12	9	2	4	1	48	15
FW	SCO	Billy Rafferty	4	0	2	0	0	0	6	0
FW	ENG	John Richards	29	13	8	3	4	2	41	18

== First Division ==
Pos	Team	Pld	W	D	L	GF	GA	GD	Pts	Qualification or relegation
4	Arsenal	42	18	16	8	52	36	+16	52	
5	Nottingham Forest	42	20	8	14	63	43	+20	48	Qualification for the European Cup first round (Note: Nottingham Forest qualified for the European Cup first round as the 1979–80 European Cup winners.)
6	Wolverhampton Wanderers	42	19	9	14	58	47	+11	47	Qualification for the UEFA Cup first round (Note: Wolverhampton Wanderers qualified for the UEFA Cup as the 1979–80 Football League Cup winners.)
7	Aston Villa	42	16	14	12	51	50	+1	46	
8	Southampton	42	18	9	15	65	53	+12	45	

Source: World Football
Rules for classification: 1) Points; 2) Goal difference; 3) Goals scored

== Results ==
=== First Division ===
22 August 1979 1	Derby County	0–1	Wolverhampton Wanderers	Derby
			Clarke 8'	Stadium: Baseball Ground; Attendance: 21,727

25 August 1979 2	Wolverhampton Wanderers	3–0	Ipswich Town	Wolverhampton
	Clarke 36'; Daniel 53'; Eves 85'			Stadium: Molineux; Attendance: 22,025

1 September 1979 3	Bristol City	2–0	Wolverhampton Wanderers	Bristol
	Gow 7'; Royle 70'			Stadium: Ashton Gate; Attendance: 18,835

8 September 1979 4	Wolverhampton Wanderers	1–1	Crystal Palace	Wolverhampton
	Clarke 52'		Swindlehurst 32'	Stadium: Molineux; Attendance: 24,580

15 September 1979 5	Everton	2–3	Wolverhampton Wanderers	Liverpool
	Kidd 19'; Ross 62' (pen.)		Gray 49'; Daniel 58' (pen.); Richards 67'	Stadium: Goodison Park; Attendance: 31,807

22 September 1979 6	Wolverhampton Wanderers	3–1	Manchester United	Wolverhampton
	Hibbitt 33'; Gray 75'; Richards 80'		Macari 8'	Stadium: Molineux; Attendance: 35,954

29 September 1979 7	Arsenal	2–3	Wolverhampton Wanderers	London
	Stapleton 48'; Hollins 79'		Hibbitt 18'; Gray 27', 71'	Stadium: Highbury; Attendance: 41,844

6 October 1979 8	Nottingham Forest	3–2	Wolverhampton Wanderers	West Bridgford
	Francis 2'; Robertson 23' (pen.); Birtles 37'		Richards 45'; Daniel 86' (pen.)	Stadium: City Ground; Attendance: 27,569

9 October 1979 9	Wolverhampton Wanderers	0–0	Derby County	Wolverhampton
				Stadium: Molineux; Attendance: 30,131

13 October 1979 10	Wolverhampton Wanderers	1–0	Norwich City	Wolverhampton
	Carr 9'			Stadium: Molineux; Attendance: 28,060

20 October 1979 11	Middlesbrough	1–0	Wolverhampton Wanderers	Middlesbrough
	Proctor 54'			Stadium: Ayresome Park; Attendance: 18,393

27 October 1979 12	Wolverhampton Wanderers	1–1	Aston Villa	Wolverhampton
	Gray 15'		Shaw 44'	Stadium: Molineux; Attendance: 36,267

3 November 1979 13	Liverpool	3–0	Wolverhampton Wanderers	Liverpool
	Dalglish 4', 51'; R. Kennedy 76'			Stadium: Anfield; Attendance: 49,541

10 November 1979 14	Stoke City	0–1	Wolverhampton Wanderers	Stoke-on-Trent
			Hibbitt 33'	Stadium: Victoria Ground; Attendance: 26,061

17 November 1979 15	Wolverhampton Wanderers	0–3	Coventry City	Wolverhampton
			Wallace 8'; Ferguson 55', 85'	Stadium: Molineux; Attendance: 22,805

24 November 1979 16	Wolverhampton Wanderers	0–0	West Bromwich Albion	Wolverhampton
				Stadium: Molineux; Attendance: 32,564

1 December 1979 17	Manchester City	2–3	Wolverhampton Wanderers	Manchester
	Palmer 40'; Deyna 89'		Gray 17'; Hibbitt 42'; Daniel 55'	Stadium: Maine Road; Attendance: 33,894

8 December 1979 18	Wolverhampton Wanderers	3–1	Bolton Wanderers	Wolverhampton
	Gray 11', 71'; Walsh 20' (o.g.)		Whatmore 81'	Stadium: Molineux; Attendance: 20,169

15 December 1979 19	Leeds United	3–0	Wolverhampton Wanderers	Leeds
	Connor 13'; Graham 41'; Hamson 50'			Stadium: Elland Road; Attendance: 21,227

21 December 1979 20	Wolverhampton Wanderers	1–3	Brighton & Hove Albion	Wolverhampton
	Eves 81'		Ward 36', 44', 68'	Stadium: Molineux; Attendance: 15,807

26 December 1979 21	Wolverhampton Wanderers	0–0	Southampton	Wolverhampton
				Stadium: Molineux; Attendance: 22,808

29 December 1979 22	Ipswich Town	1–0	Wolverhampton Wanderers	Ipswich
	Butcher 55'			Stadium: Portman Road; Attendance: 22,333

12 January 1980 23	Wolverhampton Wanderers	3–0	Bristol City	Wolverhampton
	Gray 15'; Richards 74'; Daniel 89'			Stadium: Molineux; Attendance: 18,835

19 January 1980 24	Crystal Palace	1–0	Wolverhampton Wanderers	London
	Flanagan 11'			Stadium: Selhurst Park; Attendance: 22,577

2 February 1980 25	Wolverhampton Wanderers	0–0	Everton	Wolverhampton
				Stadium: Molineux; Attendance: 21,663

9 February 1980 26	Manchester United	0–1	Wolverhampton Wanderers	Stretford
			Eves 24'	Stadium: Old Trafford; Attendance: 51,568

23 February 1980 27	Norwich City	0–4	Wolverhampton Wanderers	Norwich
			Hibbitt 14' (pen.), 47' (pen.); Eves 40'; Richards 46'	Stadium: Carrow Road; Attendance: 17,063

26 February 1980 28	Wolverhampton Wanderers	1–0	Liverpool	Wolverhampton
	Richards 71'			Stadium: Molineux; Attendance: 36,693

1 March 1980 29	Wolverhampton Wanderers	0–2	Middlesbrough	Wolverhampton
			Hodgson 82', 89'	Stadium: Molineux; Attendance: 21,852

10 March 1980 30	Aston Villa	1–3	Wolverhampton Wanderers	Birmingham
	Shaw 32'		Brazier 20'; Bell 28'; Daniel 36'	Stadium: Villa Park; Attendance: 30,432

22 March 1980 31	Wolverhampton Wanderers	3–0	Stoke City	Wolverhampton
	Gray 17'; Eves 29'; Richards 57'			Stadium: Molineux; Attendance: 27,968

29 March 1980 32	Coventry City	1–3	Wolverhampton Wanderers	Coventry
	English 55'		Atkinson 13'; Richards 27', 72'	Stadium: Highfield Road; Attendance: 19,507

5 April 1980 33	Wolverhampton Wanderers	1–2	Tottenham Hotspur	Wolverhampton
	Richards 38'		Jones 10'; Galvin 32'	Stadium: Molineux; Attendance: 30,713

7 April 1980 34	Southampton	0–3	Wolverhampton Wanderers	Southampton
			Gray 26', 67'; Bell 85'	Stadium: The Dell; Attendance: 22,307

8 April 1980 35	Brighton & Hove Albion	3–0	Wolverhampton Wanderers	Hove
	Ward 24', 78'; Carr 80' (o.g.)			Stadium: Goldstone Ground; Attendance: 27,026

12 April 1980 36	Wolverhampton Wanderers	1–2	Manchester City	Wolverhampton
	Futcher 22' (o.g.)		Reeves 14'; Tueart 53' (pen.)	Stadium: Molineux; Attendance: 23,850

19 April 1980 37	West Bromwich Albion	0–0	Wolverhampton Wanderers	West Bromwich
				Stadium: The Hawthorns; Attendance: 30,010

23 April 1980 38	Tottenham Hotspur	2–2	Wolverhampton Wanderers	London
	Armstrong 53'; Galvin 76'		Hibbitt 14'; Bell 20'	Stadium: White Hart Lane; Attendance: 19,843

26 April 1980 39	Wolverhampton Wanderers	3–1	Leeds United	Wolverhampton
	Richards 20'; Eves 46'; Hibbitt 61'		Flynn 89'	Stadium: Molineux; Attendance: 22,746

3 May 1980 40	Bolton Wanderers	0–0	Wolverhampton Wanderers	Bolton
				Stadium: Burnden Park; Attendance: 11,710

12 May 1980 41	Wolverhampton Wanderers	3–1	Nottingham Forest	Wolverhampton
	Hibbitt 5' (pen.); Richards 77'; Palmer 82'		O'Neill 60'	Stadium: Molineux; Attendance: 21,725

16 May 1980 42	Wolverhampton Wanderers	1–2	Arsenal	Wolverhampton
	Richards 89'		Walford 60'; Stapleton 74'	Stadium: Molineux; Attendance: 23,619

=== League Cup ===
28 August 1979 2nd Round 1st Leg	Burnley	1–1	Wolverhampton Wanderers	Burnley
	Dobson 37'		Palmer 65'	Stadium: Turf Moor; Attendance: 6,103

4 September 1979 2nd Round 2nd Leg	Wolverhampton Wanderers	2–0	Burnley	Wolverhampton
	Hibbitt 21'; Palmer 61'			Stadium: Molineux; Attendance: 18,213

25 September 1979 3rd Round	Crystal Palace	1–2	Wolverhampton Wanderers	London
	Flanagan 2'		Hibbitt 76'; Eves 87'	Stadium: Selhurst Park; Attendance: 30,727

30 October 1979 4th Round	Queens Park Rangers	1–1	Wolverhampton Wanderers	London
	Allen 39'		Hibbitt 90'	Stadium: Loftus Road; Attendance: 20,984

6 November 1979 4th Round Replay	Wolverhampton Wanderers	1–0	Queens Park Rangers	Wolverhampton
	Carr 8'			Stadium: Molineux; Attendance: 26,014

4 December 1979 5th Round	Grimsby Town	0–0	Wolverhampton Wanderers	Cleethorpes
				Stadium: Blundell Park; Attendance: 23,115

11 December 1979 5th Round Replay	Wolverhampton Wanderers	1–1 (a.e.t.)	Grimsby Town	Wolverhampton
	Gray 22'		Palmer 72' (o.g.)	Stadium: Molineux; Attendance: 28,445

18 December 1979 5th Round 2nd Replay	Grimsby Town	0–2	Wolverhampton Wanderers	Derby
			Hibbitt 51' (pen.); Richards 57'	Stadium: Baseball Ground; Attendance: 16,475

22 January 1980 Semi-Final 1st Leg	Swindon Town	2–1	Wolverhampton Wanderers	Swindon
	Rowland 13'; Mayes 86'		Daniel 26'	Stadium: County Ground; Attendance: 25,784

12 February 1980 Semi-Final 2nd Leg	Wolverhampton Wanderers	3–1	Swindon Town	Wolverhampton
	Richards 52', 74'; Eves 57'		McHale 64' (pen.)	Stadium: Molineux; Attendance: 41,031

15 March 1980 Final	Nottingham Forest	0–1	Wolverhampton Wanderers	London
			Gray 66'	Stadium: Wembley; Attendance: 96,527

=== FA Cup ===
5 January 1980 3rd Round	Notts County	1–3	Wolverhampton Wanderers	Nottingham
	Hunt 63'		Berry 3'; Carr 24'; Richards 76'	Stadium: Meadow Lane; Attendance: 10,803

26 January 1980 4th Round	Wolverhampton Wanderers	1–1	Norwich City	Wolverhampton
	Gray 61'		Bond 39'	Stadium: Molineux; Attendance: 25,516

30 January 1980 4th Round Replay	Norwich City	2–3	Wolverhampton Wanderers	Norwich
	Bond 20'; Mendham 55'		Eves 6'; Richards 24'; Berry 44'	Stadium: Carrow Road; Attendance: 23,101

16 February 1980 5th Round	Wolverhampton Wanderers	0–3	Watford	Wolverhampton
			Poskett 75', 87'; Blissett 90'	Stadium: Molineux; Attendance: 32,861
