= 1982–83 Wolverhampton Wanderers F.C. season =

English football club season

Wolverhampton Wanderers
1982–83 season
- Chairman: Derek Dougan
- Manager: Graham Hawkins
- Stadium: Molineux
- Football League Second Division: 2nd (promoted)
- Milk Cup: Second round
- FA Cup: Fourth round
- Top goalscorer: League: Mel Eves (18); All: Mel Eves (19)
- Highest home attendance: 22,567 v Leeds United (Division Two, 3 January 1983)
- Lowest home attendance: 11,856 v Middlesbrough (Division Two, 4 December 1982)
- Average home league attendance: 15,683
- Biggest win: 5–0 v Charlton Athletic (H), Division Two, 7 September 1982
- Biggest defeat: 0–5 v Sunderland (A), Milk Cup, 27 October 1982; 0–5 v Leicester City (A), Division Two, 26 February 1983

The 1982–83 season was the 84th of competitive league football in the history of Wolverhampton Wanderers. They finished runners-up in the Second Division to win promotion back to the First Division after one season away.

== Season summary ==
Wolves were relegated from the First Division at the end of the 1981–82 season and went into receivership as financial difficulties following construction of the new John Ireland stand caught up with them. They came close to liquidation but were saved at the eleventh hour by a consortium fronted by former player Derek Dougan.

Dougan sacked manager Ian Greaves and replaced him with former Wolves teammate Graham Hawkins. Hawkins named Jim Barron as his assistant and put Frank Upton in charge of the youth team with a brief that young players would be important to the first team due to the club's tight budget. Indeed, three teenagers – Dave Wintersgill, Billy Livingstone and Paul Butler – made their debuts against Blackburn Rovers on the opening day of the new season.

Wolves were unbeaten for the first 10 matches and also went 817 minutes without conceding a league goal. Both runs were ended by Leicester City on 16 October, the first of five defeats in seven matches, but an 11-match unbeaten run followed and a 3–0 win over Leeds United on 3 January took Wolves six points clear at the top of the division. Promotion was secured by a 3–3 draw at Charlton Athletic on 2 May, despite Wolves struggling for form in the latter half of the campaign and eventually finishing 10 points behind champions Queens Park Rangers.

== Squad ==
Substitute appearances indicated in brackets

Pos.	Nat.	Name	League		Milk Cup		FA Cup		Total	
Pos.	Nat.	Name	Apps	Goals	Apps	Goals	Apps	Goals	Apps	Goals
GK	ENG	Paul Bradshaw	0	0	0	0	0	0	0	0
GK	ENG	John Burridge	42	0	2	0	2	0	46	0
DF	IRE	Hugh Atkinson	0	0	0	0	0	0	0	0
DF	ENG	Bobby Coy	15(3)	0	2	0	0	0	17(3)	0
DF	ENG	Alan Dodd	27	3	0	0	2	0	29	3
DF	ENG	Joe Gallagher	3	0	0	0	0	0	3	0
DF	ENG	Mike Hollifield	0	0	0	0	0	0	0	0
DF	ENG	John Humphrey	42	3	2	0	2	0	46	3
DF	ENG	Geoff Palmer	40(1)	5	2	0	2	0	44(1)	5
DF	IRE	John Pender	39	1	2	0	2	0	43	1
DF	SCO	Gordon Smith	24(3)	2	1	0	2	0	27(3)	2
MF	ENG	Paul Butler	1(7)	0	0(2)	0	0	0	1(9)	0
MF	ENG	Ian Cartwright	7(2)	1	0	0	0	0	7(2)	1
MF	ENG	Peter Daniel	13	0	2	0	0	0	15	0
MF	ENG	Kenny Hibbitt	27(4)	2	1	0	2	1	30(4)	3
MF	SCO	Billy Kellock	9	3	0	0	0	0	9	3
MF	IRE	Anthony Kernan	0	0	0	0	0	0	0	0
MF	ENG	Mick Matthews	40	5	2	0	2	0	44	5
MF	ENG	Dale Rudge	8	0	0	0	1	0	9	0
MF	ENG	Dave Wintersgill	2	0	0	0	0	0	2	0
FW	ENG	Wayne Clarke	38(1)	12	2	0	1	0	41(1)	12
FW	IRE	John Croke	0	0	0	0	0	0	0	0
FW	ENG	Mel Eves	40	18	2	1	2	0	44	19
FW	SCO	Andy Gray	33	10	1	0	2	0	36	10
FW	ENG	Billy Livingstone	10(1)	3	1	0	0	0	11(1)	3
FW	ENG	John Richards	2(2)	0	0	0	0	0	2(2)	0

== Second Division ==
Pos	Team	Pld	W	D	L	GF	GA	GD	Pts	Relegation
1	Queens Park Rangers (C, P)	42	26	7	9	77	36	+41	85	Promotion to the First Division
2	Wolverhampton Wanderers (P)	42	20	15	7	68	44	+24	75	Promotion to the First Division
3	Leicester City (P)	42	20	10	12	72	44	+28	70	Promotion to the First Division
4	Fulham	42	20	9	13	64	47	+17	69	
5	Newcastle United	42	18	13	11	75	53	+22	67	

Rules for classification: 1) Points; 2) Goal difference; 3) Goals scored
(C) Champions; (P) Promoted

== Results ==
=== Second Division ===
28 August 1982 1	Wolverhampton Wanderers	2–1	Blackburn Rovers	Wolverhampton
	Eves 48', 77'		Garner 23'	Stadium: Molineux; Attendance: 15,605

31 August 1982 2	Chelsea	0–0	Wolverhampton Wanderers	London
				Stadium: Stamford Bridge; Attendance: 14,192

4 September 1982 3	Leeds United	0–0	Wolverhampton Wanderers	Leeds
				Stadium: Elland Road; Attendance: 16,462

7 September 1982 4	Wolverhampton Wanderers	5–0	Charlton Athletic	Wolverhampton
	Eves 5'; Gray 41'; Palmer 50' (pen.); Clarke 80'; Matthews 85'			Stadium: Molineux; Attendance: 13,063

11 September 1982 5	Wolverhampton Wanderers	2–0	Barnsley	Wolverhampton
	Humphrey 60'; Eves 65'			Stadium: Molineux; Attendance: 15,065

18 September 1982 6	Bolton Wanderers	0–1	Wolverhampton Wanderers	Bolton
			Livingstone 85'	Stadium: Burnden Park; Attendance: 9264

25 September 1982 7	Wolverhampton Wanderers	2–0	Rotherham United	Wolverhampton
	Clarke 3'; Humphrey 69'			Stadium: Molineux; Attendance: 16,377

2 October 1982 8	Carlisle United	0–2	Wolverhampton Wanderers	Carlisle
			Smith 4'; Livingstone 36'	Stadium: Brunton Park; Attendance: 7723

9 October 1982 9	Sheffield Wednesday	0–0	Wolverhampton Wanderers	Sheffield
				Stadium: Hillsborough; Attendance: 21,519

16 October 1982 10	Wolverhampton Wanderers	0–3	Leicester City	Wolverhampton
			Wilson 29'; Lineker 34'; English 89'	Stadium: Molineux; Attendance: 15,782

30 October 1982 11	Wolverhampton Wanderers	2–1	Derby County	Wolverhampton
	Palmer 41' (pen.); Gray 55'		Wilson 61'	Stadium: Molineux; Attendance: 13,802

2 November 1982 12	Cambridge United	2–1	Wolverhampton Wanderers	Cambridge
	Lockhart 34'; Reilly 76'		Eves 89'	Stadium: Abbey Stadium; Attendance: 4571

6 November 1982 13	Wolverhampton Wanderers	3–0	Grimsby Town	Wolverhampton
	Gray 15'; Eves 46'; Clarke 62'			Stadium: Molineux; Attendance: 12,701

13 November 1982 14	Oldham Athletic	4–1	Wolverhampton Wanderers	Oldham
	Ryan 15'; Wylde 50', 77', 86'		Hibbitt 65'	Stadium: Boundary Park; Attendance: 7962

20 November 1982 15	Wolverhampton Wanderers	2–4	Fulham	Wolverhampton
	Clarke 10'; Gray 41'		Lewington 26'; Davies 59', 73'; Wilson 85'	Stadium: Molineux; Attendance: 14,447

27 November 1982 16	Crystal Palace	3–4	Wolverhampton Wanderers	London
	Cannon 2'; Jones 4'; Hinshelwood 55'		Matthews 6', 72'; Clarke 33'; Gray 42'	Stadium: Selhurst Park; Attendance: 10,225

4 December 1982 17	Wolverhampton Wanderers	4–0	Middlesbrough	Wolverhampton
	Eves 2', 31'; Cartwright 20'; Dodd 83'			Stadium: Molineux; Attendance: 11,854

11 December 1982 18	Newcastle United	1–1	Wolverhampton Wanderers	Newcastle upon Tyne
	Wharton 6'		Eves 16'	Stadium: St James' Park; Attendance: 19,485

18 December 1982 19	Wolverhampton Wanderers	4–0	Queens Park Rangers	Wolverhampton
	Humphrey 51'; Clarke 74'; Palmer 78' (pen.); Dodd 89'			Stadium: Molineux; Attendance: 15,423

27 December 1982 20	Shrewsbury Town	0–2	Wolverhampton Wanderers	Shrewsbury
			Clarke 34', 55'	Stadium: Gay Meadow; Attendance: 13,336

28 December 1982 21	Wolverhampton Wanderers	2–0	Burnley	Wolverhampton
	Eves 70'; Gray 89'			Stadium: Molineux; Attendance: 21,961

1 January 1983 22	Fulham	1–3	Wolverhampton Wanderers	London
	Lewington 38'		Pender 26'; Clarke 45'; Eves 76'	Stadium: Craven Cottage; Attendance: 17,196

3 January 1983 23	Wolverhampton Wanderers	3–0	Leeds United	Wolverhampton
	Clarke 32'; Gray 70'; Eves 84'			Stadium: Molineux; Attendance: 22,567

15 January 1983 24	Blackburn Rovers	2–2	Wolverhampton Wanderers	Blackburn
	Branagan 31'; Keeley 44'		Matthews 55'; Dodd 62'	Stadium: Ewood Park; Attendance: 7441

22 January 1983 25	Wolverhampton Wanderers	2–1	Chelsea	Wolverhampton
	Eves 5'; Clarke 72'		Pates 38'	Stadium: Molineux; Attendance: 19,533

5 February 1983 26	Barnsley	2–1	Wolverhampton Wanderers	Barnsley
	Banks 15'; Parker 88'		Smith 12'	Stadium: Oakwell; Attendance: 13,575

12 February 1983 27	Wolverhampton Wanderers	2–1	Carlisle United	Wolverhampton
	Eves 45'; Livingstone 89'		Bannon 15'	Stadium: Molineux; Attendance: 13,171

26 February 1983 28	Leicester City	5–0	Wolverhampton Wanderers	Leicester
	Lynex 15', 39'; A. Smith 29'; Lineker 59'; Daly 74'			Stadium: Filbert Street; Attendance: 13,530

1 March 1983 29	Wolverhampton Wanderers	1–0	Sheffield Wednesday	Wolverhampton
	Clarke 25' (pen.)			Stadium: Molineux; Attendance: 16,656

5 March 1983 30	Wolverhampton Wanderers	1–1	Cambridge United	Wolverhampton
	Eves 76'		Mayo 87'	Stadium: Molineux; Attendance: 13,204

12 March 1983 31	Derby County	1–1	Wolverhampton Wanderers	Derby
	Swindlehurst 33'		Kellock 77'	Stadium: Baseball Ground; Attendance: 17,644

19 March 1983 32	Grimsby Town	1–1	Wolverhampton Wanderers	Cleethorpes
	Waters 21' (pen.)		Eves 50'	Stadium: Blundell Park; Attendance: 7624

26 March 1983 33	Wolverhampton Wanderers	0–0	Oldham Athletic	Wolverhampton
				Stadium: Molineux; Attendance: 12,940

2 April 1983 34	Burnley	0–1	Wolverhampton Wanderers	Burnley
			Palmer 7'	Stadium: Turf Moor; Attendance: 9593

4 April 1983 35	Wolverhampton Wanderers	2–2	Shrewsbury Town	Wolverhampton
	Palmer 13' (pen.); Eves 16'		Bates 36', 82'	Stadium: Molineux; Attendance: 17,509

9 April 1983 36	Rotherham United	1–1	Wolverhampton Wanderers	Rotherham
	Seasman 59'		Hibbitt 6'	Stadium: Millmoor; Attendance: 7286

16 April 1983 37	Wolverhampton Wanderers	0–0	Bolton Wanderers	Wolverhampton
				Stadium: Molineux; Attendance: 12,723

23 April 1983 38	Middlesbrough	0–0	Wolverhampton Wanderers	Middlesbrough
				Stadium: Ayresome Park; Attendance: 10,314

30 April 1983 39	Wolverhampton Wanderers	1–0	Crystal Palace	Wolverhampton
	Gray 52'			Stadium: Molineux; Attendance: 12,523

2 May 1983 40	Charlton Athletic	3–3	Wolverhampton Wanderers	London
	Smith 55'; White 57'; Hales 67'		Kellock 10', 23'; Eves 33'	Stadium: The Valley; Attendance: 7935

7 May 1983 41	Queens Park Rangers	2–1	Wolverhampton Wanderers	London
	Flanagan 21'; Hazell 85'		Gray 42'	Stadium: Loftus Road; Attendance: 19,854

14 May 1983 42	Wolverhampton Wanderers	2–2	Newcastle United	Wolverhampton
	Matthews 25'; Gray 39'		McDonald 40'; Varadi 44'	Stadium: Molineux; Attendance: 22,446

=== Milk Cup ===
5 October 1982 2nd Round 1st Leg	Wolverhampton Wanderers	1–1	Sunderland	Wolverhampton
	Eves 40'		Rowell 6' (pen.)	Stadium: Molineux; Attendance: 13,662

27 October 1982 2nd Round 2nd Leg	Sunderland	5–0	Wolverhampton Wanderers	Sunderland
	Chisholm 1', 10'; Hindmarch 9'; Rowell 16'; McCoist 55'			Stadium: Roker Park; Attendance: 11,091

=== FA Cup ===
8 January 1983 3rd Round	Tranmere Rovers	0–1	Wolverhampton Wanderers	Birkenhead
			Hibbitt 69'	Stadium: Prenton Park; Attendance: 10,803

29 January 1983 4th Round	Aston Villa	1–0	Wolverhampton Wanderers	Birmingham
	Withe 20'			Stadium: Villa Park; Attendance: 43,121
