= 1979–80 Football League Cup =

1979–80 League Cup
Tournament details
- Country: England; Wales
- Teams: 92

Final positions
- Champions: Wolverhampton Wanderers
- Runners-up: Nottingham Forest

Tournament statistics
- Top goal scorer: Frank Stapleton (5 goals)

The 1979–80 Football League Cup was the 20th season of the Football League Cup, a knockout competition for England's top 92 football clubs. The winners qualified for the 1980–81 UEFA Cup, if not already qualified for European competition. Wolverhampton Wanderers won the competition by defeating the reigning holders and European champions Nottingham Forest 1–0 in the final on 15 March 1980. This was their second League Cup success, after winning in 1974.

== First round ==
The 56 Football League clubs who had comprised the Third and Fourth Divisions during the previous season, plus the bottom eight of the Second Division, all competed from the first round. Ties were two-legged affairs, with the away goals rule being applied after extra time where necessary. If teams could still not be divided, penalties were taken. Games were staged on 11/13 and 14–15 August 1979.

=== First leg ===
Home team	Score	Away team	Date
Blackpool	1–1	Rochdale	11 August 1979
Bradford City	0–2	Darlington	11 August 1979
Bury	0–3	Blackburn Rovers	11 August 1979
Chester	2–1	Walsall	11 August 1979
Chesterfield	5–1	Hartlepool United	11 August 1979
Colchester United	2–0	Watford	11 August 1979
Gillingham	3–0	Luton Town	11 August 1979
Grimsby Town	2–0	Scunthorpe United	11 August 1979
Halifax Town	2–2	Shrewsbury Town	11 August 1979
Hereford United	1–3	Exeter City	11 August 1979
Huddersfield Town	2–1	Crewe Alexandra	11 August 1979
Leicester City	1–2	Rotherham United	11 August 1979
Lincoln City	2–1	Barnsley	11 August 1979
Mansfield Town	1–0	York City	11 August 1979
Newport County	1–0	Plymouth Argyle	11 August 1979
Northampton Town	2–1	Millwall	13 August 1979
Oxford United	1–5	Reading	11 August 1979
Peterborough United	3–1	Charlton Athletic	11 August 1979
Portsmouth	1–1	Swindon Town	11 August 1979
Port Vale	1–2	Tranmere Rovers	11 August 1979
Sheffield United	1–1	Doncaster Rovers	11 August 1979
Sheffield Wednesday	1–1	Hull City	11 August 1979
Southend United	2–1	Brentford	15 August 1979
Stockport County	2–1	Wigan Athletic	11 August 1979
Swansea City	4–1	Bournemouth	11 August 1979
Torquay United	1–2	Bristol Rovers	11 August 1979
Wimbledon	4–1	Aldershot	11 August 1979
Wrexham	1–1	Carlisle United	11 August 1979

=== Second leg ===
Home team	Score	Away team	Date	Agg
Aldershot	1–2	Wimbledon	14 August 1979	2–6
Barnsley	2–1	Lincoln City	14 August 1979	3–3
Blackburn Rovers	3–2	Bury	14 August 1979	6–2
Bournemouth	0–0	Swansea City	14 August 1979	1–4
Brentford	1–4	Southend United	21 August 1979	2–6
Bristol Rovers	1–3	Torquay United	14 August 1979	3–4
Carlisle United	1–2	Wrexham	14 August 1979	2–3
Charlton Athletic	1–1	Peterborough United	14 August 1979	2–4
Crewe Alexandra	1–3	Huddersfield Town	15 August 1979	2–5
Darlington	0–3	Bradford City	14 August 1979	2–3
Doncaster Rovers	3–1	Sheffield United	14 August 1979	4–2
Exeter City	2–1	Hereford United	15 August 1979	5–2
Hartlepool United	2–1	Chesterfield	14 August 1979	3–6
Hull City	1–2	Sheffield Wednesday	14 August 1979	2–3
Luton Town	1–1	Gillingham	14 August 1979	1–4
Millwall	2–2	Northampton Town	15 August 1979	3–4
Plymouth Argyle	2–0	Newport County	14 August 1979	2–1
Reading	2–1	Oxford United	15 August 1979	7–2
Rochdale	0–1	Blackpool	14 August 1979	1–2
Rotherham United	3–0	Leicester City	14 August 1979	5–1
Scunthorpe United	0–0	Grimsby Town	14 August 1979	0–2
Shrewsbury Town	1–0	Halifax Town	14 August 1979	3–2
Swindon Town	2–0	Portsmouth	14 August 1979	3–1
Tranmere Rovers	1–0	Port Vale	15 August 1979	3–1
Walsall	0–0	Chester	14 August 1979	1–2
Watford	2–1	Colchester United	14 August 1979	2–3
Wigan Athletic	0–0	Stockport County	15 August 1979	1–2
York City	3–2	Mansfield Town	14 August 1979	3–3

== Second round ==
The 28 first round winners were joined by the remaining clubs from the Second Division and all from the First Division. Ties for the first time in League Cup were two-legged affairs at this stage of the competition, with the away goals rule being applied after extra time where necessary. If teams could still not be divided, penalties were taken. Games were staged on 28–29 August and 3–5 September 1979.

=== First leg ===
Home team	Score	Away team	Date
Birmingham City	2–1	Preston North End	28 August 1979
Blackburn Rovers	1–1	Nottingham Forest	29 August 1979
Bolton Wanderers	1–2	Southend United	28 August 1979
Brighton and Hove Albion	2–0	Cambridge United	28 August 1979
Bristol City	1–0	Rotherham United	28 August 1979
Burnley	1–1	Wolverhampton Wanderers	28 August 1979
Chesterfield	3–0	Shrewsbury Town	28 August 1979
Colchester United	0–2	Aston Villa	28 August 1979
Derby County	0–1	Middlesbrough	29 August 1979
Doncaster Rovers	3–1	Exeter City	28 August 1979
Everton	2–0	Cardiff City	28 August 1979
Gillingham	1–1	Norwich City	28 August 1979
Grimsby Town	1–0	Huddersfield Town	28 August 1979
Ipswich Town	0–1	Coventry City	29 August 1979
Leeds United	1–1	Arsenal	29 August 1979
Orient	2–2	Wimbledon	29 August 1979
Northampton Town	3–0	Oldham Athletic	28 August 1979
Notts County	0–0	Torquay United	28 August 1979
Peterborough United	0–0	Blackpool	29 August 1979
Plymouth Argyle	2–2	Chelsea	28 August 1979
Queens Park Rangers	2–1	Bradford City	28 August 1979
Reading	4–3	Mansfield Town	29 August 1979
Sheffield Wednesday	1–1	Manchester City	28 August 1979
Southampton	5–0	Wrexham	28 August 1979
Stockport County	1–1	Crystal Palace	29 August 1979
Stoke City	1–1	Swansea City	29 August 1979
Sunderland	2–2	Newcastle United	29 August 1979
Swindon Town	1–0	Chester	28 August 1979
Tottenham Hotspur	2–1	Manchester United	29 August 1979
Tranmere Rovers	0–0	Liverpool	29 August 1979
West Bromwich Albion	1–1	Fulham	29 August 1979
West Ham United	3–1	Barnsley	28 August 1979

=== Second leg ===
Home team	Score	Away team	Date	Agg
Arsenal	7–0	Leeds United	4 September 1979	8–1
Aston Villa	0–2	Colchester United	5 September 1979	2–2
Barnsley	0–2	West Ham United	4 September 1979	1–5
Blackpool	0–1	Peterborough United	5 September 1979	0–1
Bradford City	0–2	Queens Park Rangers	5 September 1979	1–4
Cambridge United	1–2	Brighton and Hove Albion	4 September 1979	1–4
Cardiff City	1–0	Everton	5 September 1979	1–2
Chelsea	1–2	Plymouth Argyle	4 September 1979	3–4
Chester	1–1	Swindon Town	5 September 1979	1–2
Coventry City	0–0	Ipswich Town	4 September 1979	1–0
Crystal Palace	7–0	Stockport County	4 September 1979	8–1
Exeter City	5–1	Doncaster Rovers	5 September 1979	6–4
Fulham	0–1	West Bromwich Albion	5 September 1979	1–2
Huddersfield Town	1–4	Grimsby Town	4 September 1979	1–5
Liverpool	4–0	Tranmere Rovers	4 September 1979	4–0
Manchester City	2–1	Sheffield Wednesday	4 September 1979	3–2
Manchester United	3–1	Tottenham Hotspur	5 September 1979	4–3
Mansfield Town	4–2	Reading	4 September 1979	7–6
Middlesbrough	1–1	Derby County	4 September 1979	2–1
Newcastle United	2–2	Sunderland	5 September 1979	4–4
Norwich City	4–2	Gillingham	5 September 1979	5–3
Nottingham Forest	6–1	Blackburn Rovers	5 September 1979	7–2
Oldham Athletic	3–1	Northampton Town	4 September 1979	3–4
Preston North End	0–1	Birmingham City	4 September 1979	1–3
Rotherham United	1–1	Bristol City	4 September 1979	1–2
Shrewsbury Town	0–0	Chesterfield	4 September 1979	0–3
Southend United	0–0	Bolton Wanderers	3 September 1979	2–1
Swansea City	1–3	Stoke City	4 September 1979	2–4
Torquay United	0–1	Notts County	5 September 1979	0–1
Wimbledon	2–2	Orient	4 September 1979	4–4
Wolverhampton Wanderers	2–0	Burnley	4 September 1979	3–1
Wrexham	0–3	Southampton	5 September 1979	0–8

== Third round ==
Ties were straight knockout games, with additional replays if required. The original games were staged on 25–26 September 1979.

Home team	Score	Away team	Date
Arsenal	2–1	Southampton	25 September 1979
Aston Villa	0–0	Everton	25 September 1979
Birmingham City	1–2	Exeter City	26 September 1979
Crystal Palace	1–2	Wolverhampton Wanderers	25 September 1979
Grimsby Town	3–1	Notts County	25 September 1979
Liverpool	3–1	Chesterfield	25 September 1979
Manchester City	1–1	Sunderland	26 September 1979
Mansfield Town	0–3	Queens Park Rangers	25 September 1979
Middlesbrough	1–3	Nottingham Forest	25 September 1979
Northampton Town	0–1	Brighton and Hove Albion	25 September 1979
Norwich City	4–1	Manchester United	26 September 1979
Peterborough United	1–1	Bristol City	26 September 1979
Plymouth Argyle	0–0	Wimbledon	25 September 1979
Stoke City	2–2	Swindon Town	26 September 1979
West Bromwich Albion	2–1	Coventry City	26 September 1979
West Ham United	1–1	Southend United	25 September 1979

=== Replays ===
Home team	Score	Away team	Date
Bristol City	4–0	Peterborough United	2 October 1979
Everton	4–1	Aston Villa	9 October 1979
Southend United	0–0	West Ham United	1 October 1979
Sunderland	1–0	Manchester City	3 October 1979
Swindon Town	2–1	Stoke City	3 October 1979
Wimbledon	1–0	Plymouth Argyle	2 October 1979

=== 2nd Replay ===
Home team	Score	Away team	Date
West Ham United	5–1	Southend United	8 October 1979

== Fourth round ==
Ties were straight knockout games, with additional replays if required. The original games were staged on 30–31 October 1979.

=== Ties ===
Home team	Score	Away team	Date
Brighton & Hove Albion	0–0	Arsenal	30 October 1979
Bristol City	1–1	Nottingham Forest	30 October 1979
Grimsby Town	2–1	Everton	30 October 1979
Liverpool	2–0	Exeter City	30 October 1979
Queens Park Rangers	1–1	Wolverhampton Wanderers	30 October 1979
Sunderland	1–1	West Ham United	31 October 1979
West Bromwich Albion	0–0	Norwich City	31 October 1979
Wimbledon	1–2	Swindon Town	30 October 1979

=== Replays ===
Home team	Score	Away team	Date
Arsenal	4–0	Brighton & Hove Albion	13 November 1979
Norwich City	3–0	West Bromwich Albion	7 November 1979
Nottingham Forest	3–0	Bristol City	14 November 1979
West Ham United	2–1	Sunderland	5 November 1979
Wolverhampton Wanderers	1–0	Queens Park Rangers	6 November 1979

== Fifth round ==
Ties were straight knockout games, with additional replays if required.

4 December 1979

Arsenal	1–1	Swindon Town
Sunderland ((pen.))		Tucker

Highbury, London
Attendance: 38,024
Referee: J. Hunting
4 December 1979

Grimsby Town	0–0	Wolverhampton Wanderers

Blundell Park, Cleethorpes
Attendance: 23,115
4 December 1979

West Ham United	0–0	Nottingham Forest

Upton Park, London
Attendance: 35,856
5 December 1979

Norwich City	1–3	Liverpool
Peters		Johnson; Dalglish

Carrow Road, Norwich
Attendance: 23,000

=== Replays ===
11 December 1979

Swindon Town	4–3 (a.e.t.)	Arsenal
Walford ((og.)); Mayes; Hollins ((og.)); Rowland		Brady; Talbot

County Ground, Swindon
Attendance: 21,795
Referee: A. Hamil
11 December 1979

Wolverhampton Wanderers	1–1 (a.e.t.)	Grimsby Town
Gray		Palmer ((og.))

Molineux, Wolverhampton
Attendance: 28,455
12 December 1979

Nottingham Forest	3–0 (a.e.t.)	West Ham United
Birtles; O'Hare; O'Neill

City Ground, Nottingham
Attendance: 25,462

=== 2nd Replay ===
18 December 1979

Grimsby Town	0–2	Wolverhampton Wanderers
		Hibbitt ((pen.)); Richards

Baseball Ground, Derby
Attendance: 16,475

== Semi-finals ==
Ties were once again two-legged affairs with the winners advancing to the final. Extra time and then penalties would be used in the second leg if required.

=== First leg ===
22 January 1980

Nottingham Forest	1–0	Liverpool
Robertson 89' (pen.)

City Ground, Nottingham
Attendance: 32,234
22 January 1980

Swindon Town	2–1	Wolverhampton Wanderers
Rowland 13'; Mayes 86'		Daniel 26'

County Ground, Swindon
Attendance: 26,000
Referee: A. Robinson

=== Second leg ===
12 February 1980

Liverpool	1–1	Nottingham Forest
Fairclough 89'		Robertson ((pen.))

Anfield, Liverpool
Attendance: 50,880

Nottingham Forest won 2–1 on aggregate

12 February 1980

Wolverhampton Wanderers	3–1	Swindon Town
Richards 53', 73'; Eves 59'		McHale 62' (pen.)

Molineux, Wolverhampton
Attendance: 41,031
Referee: N. Midgley

Wolverhampton Wanderers won 4–3 on aggregate

== Final ==
15 March 1980
15:00 GMT

Nottingham Forest	0–1	Wolverhampton Wanderers
		A. Gray 67'

Wembley Stadium, London
Attendance: 96,527
Referee: David Richardson (Great Harwood)

Nottingham Forest	Wolverhampton Wanderers

NOTTINGHAM FOREST:
1	Peter Shilton
2	Viv Anderson
3	Frank Gray
4	John McGovern (c)
5	David Needham
6	Kenny Burns
7	Martin O'Neill
8	Ian Bowyer
9	Garry Birtles
10	Trevor Francis
11	John Robertson
Substitute:
12	John O'Hare
Manager:
Brian Clough

WOLVERHAMPTON WANDERERS:
1	Paul Bradshaw
2	Geoff Palmer
3	Derek Parkin
4	Peter Daniel
5	Emlyn Hughes (c)
6	George Berry
7	Kenny Hibbitt
8	Willie Carr
9	Andy Gray
10	John Richards
11	Mel Eves
Substitute:
12	Colin Brazier
Manager:
John Barnwell

MATCH OFFICIALS

- Assistant referees:
  - M.J.R. Barker (Oswestry)
  - B.A. Champion (Bristol)
- Reserve referee: B.H. Daniels (Brentwood)

MATCH RULES

- 90 minutes
- 30 minutes of extra-time if necessary.
- Replay (at Manchester United) if scores still level
- One named substitute
- Maximum of 1 substitution
