= Hugh Atkinson =

Hugh Atkinson may refer to:

- Hugh Atkinson (novelist) (1924–1994), Australian novelist, journalist and documentary maker
- Hugh Atkinson (footballer) (born 1960), Irish former professional footballer who played as a defender
- Hugh Craig Atkinson (1933–1986), American librarian known for his innovations in library automation and cooperation
