= 1980 Football League Cup final =

- Event: 1979–80 Football League Cup
Nottingham Forest	Wolverhampton Wanderers
0	1
- Date: 15 March 1980
- Venue: Wembley Stadium, London
- Referee: David Richardson (Great Harwood)
- Attendance: 96,527

The 1980 Football League Cup final was the final match of the 1979–80 Football League Cup, the 20th season of the Football League Cup, a football competition for the 92 teams in The Football League. The match was played at Wembley Stadium on 15 March 1980, and was contested by League Cup holders and European champions Nottingham Forest and Wolverhampton Wanderers.

Wolves won the match 1–0 thanks to an Andy Gray goal in the 67th minute.

As both League Cup and European Cup holders, Nottingham Forest had entered the match as clear favourites, although in the league table, Wolves were level on points with them with a game in hand. Victory here would have given the club a hat trick of League Cup wins, and they retained the European Cup at the end of the season. By contrast, Wolves' last silverware had been their League Cup win six years earlier and they had finished a lowly 18th in the First Division in the previous campaign, whilst Forest had ended runners-up.

== Match summary ==
Living up to their tag of favourites, Nottingham Forest took the game to Wolves and created several opportunities, all denied by Bradshaw in the Wolves goal, as Francis shot across him and Gray's mazy run through was just halted. Birtles' driven attempt at a scrambled corner was also parried away by the keeper, while Wolves' attacks largely came to nothing.

The second half started more evenly and Wolves were the first to get the ball into the net, as Richards and Carr bundled it in after Shilton had flapped at a cross, only for a foul to be awarded against Wolves. In the 67th minute, a long ball upfield by Daniel created confusion in the Forest defence, as Needham and Shilton collided with one another, leaving Gray with the simplest of chances to prod the ball into the empty net.

Forest now pressed hard for the equaliser but were thwarted by the resilient mass of Wolves' defence, as they cleared the ball after several goalmouth scrambles. In a break from the Forest onslaught, Wolves almost extended their lead further when Berry hit the woodwork. Nonetheless, the Molineux men held on to upset the odds and claim their second League Cup triumph.

The cup was then presented by then-FA Chairman Sir Harold Thompson to Wolves captain Emlyn Hughes. This completed Hughes' personal achievement of having won every major domestic honour during his career.

== Match details ==
15 March 1980
15:00 GMT

Nottingham Forest	0–1	Wolverhampton Wanderers
		Gray 67'

Wembley Stadium, London
Attendance: 96,527
Referee: David Richardson (Great Harwood)

Nottingham Forest	Wolverhampton Wanderers

1	(England) Peter Shilton
2	(England) Viv Anderson
3	(Scotland) Frank Gray
4	(Scotland) John McGovern (c)
5	(England) David Needham
6	(Scotland) Kenny Burns
7	(Northern Ireland) Martin O'Neill
8	(England) Ian Bowyer
9	(England) Garry Birtles
10	(England) Trevor Francis
11	(Scotland) John Robertson
Substitute:
12	(Scotland) John O'Hare
Manager:
(England) Brian Clough

1	(England) Paul Bradshaw
2	(England) Geoff Palmer
3	(England) Derek Parkin
4	(England) Peter Daniel
5	(England) Emlyn Hughes (c)
6	(Wales) George Berry
7	(England) Kenny Hibbitt
8	(Scotland) Willie Carr
9	(Scotland) Andy Gray
10	(England) John Richards
11	(England) Mel Eves
Substitute:
12	(England) Colin Brazier
Manager:
(England) John Barnwell

Match officials

- Assistant referees:
  - M.J.R. Barker (Oswestry)
  - B.A. Champion (Bristol)
- Reserve referee: B.H. Daniels (Brentwood)

Match rules

- 90 minutes
- 30 minutes of extra-time if necessary.
- Replay (at Manchester United) if scores still level
- One named substitute
- Maximum of 1 substitution

== Road to Wembley ==
=== Nottingham Forest ===
Round 2 (1st leg)	Blackburn Rovers	1–1	Nottingham Forest
Round 2 (2nd leg)	Nottingham Forest	6–1	Blackburn Rovers
Round 2 (2nd leg)	(Nottingham Forest won 7–2 on aggregate)		
Round 3	Middlesbrough	1–3	Nottingham Forest
Round 4	Bristol City	1–1	Nottingham Forest
Round 4 (Replay)	Nottingham Forest	3–0	Bristol City
Round 5	West Ham United	0–0	Nottingham Forest
Round 5 (Replay)	Nottingham Forest	3–0	West Ham United (a.e.t.)
Semi-final (1st leg)	Nottingham Forest	1–0	Liverpool
Semi-final (2nd leg)	Liverpool	1–1	Nottingham Forest
Semi-final (2nd leg)	(Nottingham Forest won 2–1 on aggregate)		

=== Wolverhampton Wanderers ===
Round 2 (1st leg)	Burnley	1–1	Wolverhampton Wanderers
Round 2 (2nd leg)	Wolverhampton Wanderers	2–0	Burnley
Round 2 (2nd leg)	(Wolverhampton Wanderers won 3–1 on aggregate)		
Round 3	Crystal Palace	1–2	Wolverhampton Wanderers
Round 4	Queens Park Rangers	1–1	Wolverhampton Wanderers
Round 4 (Replay)	Wolverhampton Wanderers	1–0	Queens Park Rangers
Round 5	Grimsby Town	0–0	Wolverhampton Wanderers
Round 5 (Replay)	Wolverhampton Wanderers	1–1	Grimsby Town (a.e.t.)
Round 5 (2nd replay)	Grimsby Town	0–2	Wolverhampton Wanderers
Semi-final (1st leg)	Swindon Town	2–1	Wolverhampton Wanderers
Semi-final (2nd leg)	Wolverhampton Wanderers	3–1	Swindon Town
Semi-final (2nd leg)	(Wolverhampton Wanderers won 4–3 on aggregate)		
