= Mickey Mouse cup =

British football pejorative term

"Mickey Mouse cup" is a pejorative term used particularly in British football to describe some knockout competitions regarded as having lesser prestige than others, for example the English Football League Cup, compared with the FA Cup. Despite its status as worldwide competition organised by the sport's governing body, FIFA, the term has also been applied to the FIFA Club World Cup, a competition won by an English club five times since its debut in 2000.

Often, a club that perceives a competition as a "Mickey Mouse Cup" – usually a Premier League side – will field a weakened, reserve or youth team in the competition, resting more high-profile players and further weakening the perception of the competition. However, this often has the effect of giving chances to play to developing players, who may progress into the first team.

The term may also be applied to a competition to intentionally disparage the winning of it by a rival side, or to minimise the importance of the competition to a club if knocked out. This may be done as part of a mind game with rival clubs in other competitions, or for reasons to maintain team morale.

== Cases ==
=== European club football ===
The English Football League Cup is often referred to as the "Mickey Mouse Cup" by supporters of larger Premier League clubs as is the EFL Trophy which has been known by various sponsors' names and which was previously the Associate Members Cup. The perception of a cup as "Mickey Mouse" may not be universal, since smaller and lower standard competitions give a chance for lower league clubs to win silverware, and additionally gain extra revenue from playing a much larger club. Also for some of the top league clubs, reaching and winning the final at Wembley Stadium has some prestige.

Since the rebranding of UEFA club competitions in late 1990s, the UEFA Cup has been considered by a group of mass media, personnel related to football and fans as a "minor trophy" or "Mickey Mouse cup" due to being mediatically overshadowed by the Champions League. Originally the Champions League (formerly European Cup) was only open to the domestic league winners, while the UEFA Cup featured the domestic league runners-ups and the UEFA Cup Winners' Cup was for the winners of the top domestic cup competition. However the expansion of the Champions League to include up to the top four finishers in the strongest European domestic leagues has reduced the prestige of the UEFA Cup Winners' Cup (which was abolished and folded into the UEFA Cup) and the resulting expanded UEFA Cup. Consequently achieving a top three or four domestic league finish (which guarantees Champions League participation) became much more important than winning a domestic cup (which only guarantees entry to the Europa League or Conference League). Since the 2014–15 season, the UEFA Europa League's importance has improved somewhat as winners will enter the next season's UEFA Champions League at the group stage. The Conference League, created in 2021 as a demerge of the Europa League (the UEFA Cup's commercial name since it was rebranded to resolve its sporting and economic crisis in 2008), has also been described as a "Mickey Mouse cup" by that group.

Champions League participation, and achieving a top three or four domestic league finish (which guarantees Champions League participation), has become much more important than winning a domestic cup (which only guarantees entry to the UEFA Cup) like the FA Cup or English Football League Cup. For instance the 2011–12 Copa del Rey had its final scheduled unusually late by the Royal Spanish Football Federation, so that it would allow the big clubs such as FC Barcelona and Real Madrid to focus on the Champions League. Another example was when Manchester United controversially withdrew from the 1999–2000 FA Cup, the first time the holders had done so, which combined with the UEFA Cup's decline (see above) has reduced the importance of the FA Cup and other domestic cups. United had earlier entered into the inaugural Club World Championship, supposedly to help England with its World Cup host bid, under pressure from the government and The FA. United stated that entering both the FA Cup and Club World Cup would overload their fixture schedule that would make it more difficult to defend their Champions League and Premiership titles, and claimed that they did not want to devalue the FA Cup by fielding a weaker side. The move benefited United as they received a two-week break and ended up winning the 1999–2000 league title by an 18-point margin, although they did not progress past the group stages of the Club World Cup. The withdrawal from the FA Cup, however, drew considerable criticism as this weakened the tournament's prestige and manager Alex Ferguson has since admitted his regrets in how they handled the situation. While winning three FA Cups in the 1990s, as part of the "Doubles" in 1994 and 1996 and the 1999 "Treble", switching focus to the Premier League and UEFA Champions League meant that United has only won the FA Cup in 2004,2016 and 2024.

The terms Mickey Mouse Treble and Mickey Mouse Double have been used subjectively to disparage the winning of what are perceived as multiple lesser trophies by larger clubs in a single season, in comparison to a continental treble and a double. Such terms are usually applied by a rival club. The term "Mickey Mouse Treble" along with "plastic treble" and "tinpot treble" has been used to describe Liverpool's 2001 win of the Football League Cup, UEFA Cup and FA Cup, compared to Manchester United's win of the Premier League, FA Cup and UEFA Champions League in 1999. Manchester United themselves were criticised for celebrating a 'Mickey Mouse Treble' in 2016–17 when they won the FA Community Shield, League Cup and UEFA Europa League, especially since domestic super cups are perceived to hold little, albeit still official, status in Britain. Liverpool in 2021-22 won the EFL Cup and FA Cup while finishing runners-up in the Premier League and UEFA Champions League, as they lost the title by 1 point to Manchester City while losing 1-0 to Real Madrid, with some suggesting that fixture congestion was to blame for Liverpool falling short at the end.

=== English football ===
One example of a tournament often labeled as a "Mickey Mouse cup" in English football is the Full Members' Cup, which was held between 1985 and 1992. Introduced after English clubs were banned from European competitions following the Heysel disaster, the competition was intended for teams in the top two divisions of the Football League. However, many clubs, particularly those in the First Division, chose not to participate or fielded weakened teams, leading to the perception that the tournament was of lower prestige. Despite its lack of status compared to domestic league and cup competitions, it was still won by some notable clubs such as Chelsea and Nottingham Forest. The use of the term "Mickey Mouse cup" in reference to the Full Members' Cup highlights how football fans and pundits often dismiss certain competitions when they lack widespread support, high financial incentives, or strong participation from leading clubs.

=== Other football competitions ===
Since 2010, the term has been used as a nickname for the Walt Disney World Pro Soccer Classic, a preseason tournament played by teams in the Major League Soccer, a league that itself has been called a "Mickey Mouse League".

In recent years the term has also become popular amongst Australian Football League fans when referring to the fruitless and seldom taken seriously NAB Cup.

== Other users ==
The term has also been used to undermine football referees. After a questionable decision by an official in a Newcastle United match, manager Joe Kinnear reacted by criticising the quality of refereeing, saying: "It was a blatant foul, a blatant push prior to the penalty, and he ignores it...it was just a Mickey Mouse ref doing nothing."

=== American sports ===
The Los Angeles Lakers' victory in the 2020 NBA Finals has been described as a "Mickey Mouse ring" for its unusual circumstances, chiefly the fact that the entire 2020 NBA Playoffs took place in the NBA Bubble in Walt Disney World due to the COVID-19 pandemic. Similarly, the Los Angeles Dodgers also had their 2020 World Series championship called a "Mickey Mouse ring" since the season was shortened to 60 games, whose playoffs also occurred under a bubble format across multiple neutral sites. Another circumstance in the NBA has been described with the Boston Celtics' victory in the 2024 NBA Finals and playoff run. Due to their considerably easy path to the title and NBA Finals opponent, with the faced teams in the playoffs being no higher than the 4th seed and having injury issues. The Celtics path to the NBA Finals has been considered one of the easiest ever.
