= 1973–74 Football League Cup =

League Cup

Tournament details
- Country: England; Wales
- Teams: 92

Final positions
- Champions: Wolverhampton Wanderers
- Runners-up: Manchester City

Tournament statistics
- Matches played: 132
- Goals scored: 385 (2.92 per match)
- Top goal scorer: Bob Latchford (5 goals)

The 1973–74 Football League Cup was the 14th season of the Football League Cup, a knockout competition for England's top 92 football clubs.

Wolverhampton Wanderers won the competition by defeating Manchester City 2–1 in the final on 2 March 1974. This triumph gave them entry to the 1974–75 UEFA Cup.

== First round ==
The 56 Football League clubs who had comprised the Third and Fourth Divisions during the previous season, plus the bottom eight of the Second Division, all competed from the first round. Ties were straight knockout games, with additional replays if required. The original games were staged on 28–29 August 1973.

=== Ties ===
Tie no	Home team	Score	Away team	Attendance	Date
1	Bolton Wanderers	1–1	Preston North End	17,101	28 August 1973
2	Bury	0–0	Oldham Athletic	5,534	28 August 1973
3	Southport	1–1	Blackburn Rovers	5,342	29 August 1973
4	Carlisle United	2–2	Workington	7,040	28 August 1973
5	Darlington	2–1	Bradford City	2,664	29 August 1973
6	Halifax Town	1–1	Barnsley	2,768	28 August 1973
7	York City	1–0	Huddersfield Town	6,497	29 August 1973
8	Rochdale	5–3	Hartlepools	1,836	29 August 1973
9	Chester City	0–2	Wrexham	4,791	29 August 1973
10	Tranmere Rovers	3–3	Crewe Alexandra	2,751	29 August 1973
11	Walsall	6–1	Shrewsbury Town	4,722	29 August 1973
12	Stockport County	2–0	Port Vale	3,314	29 August 1973
13	Grimsby Town	2–1	Northampton Town	7,829	28 August 1973
14	Notts County	3–4	Doncaster Rovers	7,735	28 August 1973
15	Peterborough United	2–2	Scunthorpe United	6,339	29 August 1973
16	Rotherham United	2–1	Lincoln City	3,455	28 August 1973
17	Chesterfield	1–1	Mansfield Town	6,321	29 August 1973
18	Bournemouth	1–0	Bristol Rovers	7,520	29 August 1973
19	Swindon Town	3–3	Newport County	6,873	28 August 1973
20	Swansea City	1–1	Exeter City	3,036	28 August 1973
21	Torquay United	0–2	Plymouth Argyle	6,996	29 August 1973
22	Cardiff City	2–0	Hereford United	9,821	29 August 1973
23	Reading	2–2	Watford	6,279	29 August 1973
24	Aldershot	1–1	Cambridge United	4,147	29 August 1973
25	Portsmouth	2–1	Southend United	9,652	28 August 1973
26	Gillingham	4–2	Colchester United	3,991	29 August 1973
27	Brighton and Hove Albion	1–2	Charlton Athletic	8,452	29 August 1973
28	Brentford	1–2	Orient	6,620	28 August 1973

=== Replays ===
Tie no	Home team	Score	Away team	Attendance	Date
1	Preston North End	0–2	Bolton Wanderers	18,571	5 September 1973
2	Oldham Athletic	2–3	Bury	6,045	4 September 1973
3	Blackburn Rovers	3–1	Southport	5,342	5 September 1973
4	Workington	0–1	Carlisle United		5 September 1973
6	Barnsley	0–1	Halifax Town	4,168	4 September 1973
10	Crewe Alexandra	0–1	Tranmere Rovers	4,488	5 September 1973
15	Scunthorpe United	2–1	Peterborough United	4,472	4 September 1973
17	Mansfield Town	0–1	Chesterfield	5,711	5 September 1973
19	Newport County	1–2	Swindon Town	6,007	4 September 1973
20	Exeter City	2–1	Swansea City		5 September 1973
23	Watford	2–3	Reading		5 September 1973
24	Cambridge United	3–0	Aldershot	4,147	5 September 1973

== Second round ==
The 28 first round winners were joined by the remaining clubs from the Second Division and all from the First Division. Ties were straight knockout games, with additional replays if required. The original games were staged on 2/8–10 October 1973.

=== Ties ===
Tie no	Home team	Score^{1}	Away team	Attendance	Date
1	Bournemouth	0–0	Sheffield Wednesday	11,017	10 October 1973
2	Southampton	3–0	Charlton Athletic	10,047	8 October 1973
3	Ipswich Town	2–0	Leeds United	28,385	8 October 1973
4	Everton	1–0	Reading	15,772	8 October 1973
5	Bury	2–0	Cambridge United	6,150	9 October 1973
6	Newcastle United	6–0	Doncaster Rovers	15,900	8 October 1973
7	West Ham United	2–2	Liverpool	25,823	8 October 1973
8	Scunthorpe United	0–0	Bristol City	4,418	9 October 1973
9	Arsenal	0–1	Tranmere Rovers	20,337	2 October 1973
10	Oxford United	1–1	Fulham	7,131	10 October 1973
11	Coventry City	5–1	Darlington	8,769	8 October 1973
12	Cardiff City	2–2	Burnley		10 October 1973
13	Plymouth Argyle	4–0	Portsmouth	13,202	9 October 1973
14	Orient	2–0	Blackburn Rovers	7,374	9 October 1973
15	West Bromwich Albion	2–1	Sheffield United	10,421	8 October 1973
16	Luton Town	1–1	Grimsby Town	9,656	10 October 1973
17	Manchester United	0–1	Middlesbrough	23,906	8 October 1973
18	Walsall	0–0	Manchester City	12,943	2 October 1973
19	Derby County	2–2	Sunderland	29,172	8 October 1973
20	York City	1–0	Aston Villa	7,981	9 October 1973
21	Halifax Town	0–3	Wolverhampton Wanderers	8,222	8 October 1973
22	Rotherham United	1–4	Exeter City	2,559	10 October 1973
23	Stoke City	1–0	Chelsea	17,281	8 October 1973
24	Millwall	0–0	Nottingham Forest	8,631	10 October 1973
25	Stockport County	1–0	Crystal Palace	8,501	9 October 1973
26	Chesterfield	1–0	Swindon Town	4,639	10 October 1973
27	Queens Park Rangers	1–0	Tottenham Hotspur	23,353	8 October 1973
28	Leicester City	3–3	Hull City	9,777	8 October 1973
29	Norwich City	6–2	Wrexham	10,937	10 October 1973
30	Blackpool	1–1	Birmingham City	7,943	9 October 1973
31	Gillingham	1–2	Carlisle United		10 October 1973
32	Rochdale	0–4	Bolton Wanderers	7,241	10 October 1973

=== Replays ===
Tie no	Home team	Score^{1}	Away team	Attendance	Date
1	Sheffield Wednesday	2–2	Bournemouth	5,883	15 October 1973
7	Liverpool	1–0	West Ham United	26,002	29 October 1973
8	Bristol City	2–1	Scunthorpe United	7,837	16 October 1973
10	Fulham	3–0	Oxford United	6,435	16 October 1973
12	Burnley	3–2	Cardiff City	12,313	16 October 1973
16	Grimsby Town	0–0	Luton Town	13,643	16 October 1973
18	Manchester City	0–0	Walsall	19,428	22 October 1973
19	Sunderland	2–2	Derby County	38,935	29 October 1973
24	Nottingham Forest	1–3	Millwall	9,241	16 October 1973
28	Hull City	3–2	Leicester City	16,003	31 October 1973
30	Birmingham City	4–2	Blackpool	16,880	16 October 1973

=== 2nd Replays ===
Tie no	Home team	Score^{1}	Away team	Attendance	Date
1	Sheffield Wednesday	2–1	Bournemouth	8,894	29 October 1973
16	Luton Town	2–0	Grimsby Town	15,365	23 October 1973
18	Walsall	0–4^{1}	Manchester City	13,646	30 October 1973
19	Derby County	0–3	Sunderland	38,460	31 October 1973

^{1} At Old Trafford, Manchester

== Third round ==
Ties were straight knockout games, with additional replays if required. The original games were staged on 30–31 October and 6 November 1973.

=== Ties ===
Tie no	Home team	Score^{1}	Away team	Attendance	Date
1	Hull City	4–1	Stockport County	13,753	6 November 1973
2	Birmingham City	2–2	Newcastle United	13,025	30 October 1973
3	Southampton	3–0	Chesterfield	13,663	30 October 1973
4	Stoke City	1–1	Middlesbrough	19,194	31 October 1973
5	Everton	0–1	Norwich City	22,046	30 October 1973
6	Millwall	1–1	Bolton Wanderers	9,281	31 October 1973
7	Fulham	2–2	Ipswich Town	8,964	31 October 1973
8	Tranmere Rovers	1–1	Wolverhampton Wanderers	14,442	31 October 1973
9	Orient	1–1	York City	12,061	31 October 1973
10	Carlisle United	0–1	Manchester City	14,472	6 November 1973
11	Bristol City	2–2	Coventry City	19,129	30 October 1973
12	Queens Park Rangers	8–2	Sheffield Wednesday	16,043	6 November 1973
13	Burnley	1–2	Plymouth Argyle	11,150	30 October 1973
14	Sunderland	0–2	Liverpool	36,208	21 November 1973
15	West Bromwich Albion	1–3	Exeter City	10,783	31 October 1973
16	Luton Town	0–0	Bury	8,191	31 October 1973

=== Replays ===
Tie no	Home team	Score^{1}	Away team	Attendance	Date
2	Newcastle United	0–1	Birmingham City	19,276	7 November 1973
4	Middlesbrough	1–2	Stoke City	26,068	6 November 1973
6	Bolton Wanderers	1–2	Millwall	13,501	6 November 1973
7	Ipswich Town	2–1	Fulham	21,400	14 November 1973
8	Wolverhampton Wanderers	2–1	Tranmere Rovers	14,839	13 November 1973
9	York City	2–1	Orient	11,152	6 November 1973
11	Coventry City	2–1	Bristol City	13,049	6 November 1973
16	Bury	2–3	Luton Town	7,827	6 November 1973

== Fourth round ==
Ties were straight knockout games, with additional replays if required. The original games were staged on 20–21 and 27 November 1973.

=== Ties ===
Tie no	Home team	Score^{1}	Away team	Attendance	Date
1	York City	0–0	Manchester City	15,360	21 November 1973
2	Queens Park Rangers	0–3	Plymouth Argyle	19,072	20 November 1973
3	Southampton	0–2	Norwich City	14,415	21 November 1973
4	Ipswich Town	1–3	Birmingham City	12,241	21 November 1973
5	Wolverhampton Wanderers	5–1	Exeter City	7,623	20 November 1973
6	Millwall	3–1	Luton Town	8,777	21 November 1973
7	Coventry City	2–1	Stoke City	17,485	20 November 1973
8	Hull City	0–0	Liverpool	19,748	27 November 1973

=== Replays ===
Tie no	Home team	Score^{1}	Away team	Attendance	Date
1	Manchester City	4–1	York City	17,972	5 December 1973
8	Liverpool	3–1	Hull City	17,120	4 December 1973

== Fifth round ==
Ties were straight knockout games, with additional replays if required.

19 December 1973
14:00 GMT

Wolverhampton Wanderers	1–0	Liverpool
Richards 46'

Molineux, Wolverhampton
Attendance: 15,242
Referee: Roy Capey (Madeley Heath)
19 December 1973
14:00 GMT

Coventry City	2–2	Manchester City
Alderson		Booth; Leman

Highfield Road, Coventry
Attendance: 12,661
Referee: Malcolm Sinclair (Guildford)

Replay

16 January 1974
13:30 GMT

Manchester City	4–2	Coventry City
Summerbee 65'; Lee 78', 80'; Law 87'		Alderson 35', 68'

Maine Road, Manchester
Attendance: 25,409
Referee: Pat Partridge (Mexborough)
19 December 1973
14:00 GMT

Millwall	1–1	Norwich City
Wood		Howard

The Den, London
Attendance: 10,708
Referee: Harry New (Bristol)

Replay

16 January 1974
13:30 GMT

Norwich City	2–1	Millwall
Suggett 10'; Sissons 83' (pen.)		Smethurst 73'

Carrow Road, Norwich
Attendance: 7,737
Referee: Roger Kirkpatrick (Leicestershire)
19 December 1973
14:00 GMT

Birmingham City	1–2	Plymouth Argyle
Hatton 9'		Welsh 36'; Davey 38'

St Andrews, Birmingham
Attendance: 15,273
Referee: Walter Johnson (Kendal)

== Semi-finals ==
Ties were two-legged affairs with the winners advancing to the final. Extra time and then penalties would be used in the second leg if required.

=== First leg ===
23 January 1974
14:00 GMT

Plymouth Argyle	1–1	Manchester City
Davey 40'		Booth 65'

Home Park, Plymouth
Attendance: 30,390
Referee: John Yates (Redditch)
23 January 1974
19:45 GMT

Norwich City	1–1	Wolverhampton Wanderers
Mellor 57'		Richards 79'

Carrow Road, Norwich
Attendance: 20,517
Referee: Gordon Kew (Amersham)

=== Second leg ===
26 January 1974
14:00 GMT

Wolverhampton Wanderers	1–0	Norwich City
Richards

Molineux, Wolverhampton
Attendance: 32,605

Wolverhampton Wanderers won 2–1 on aggregate

30 January 1974
19:30 GMT

Manchester City	2–0	Plymouth Argyle
Lee 10'; Bell 48'

Maine Road, Manchester
Attendance: 40,117
Referee: Gordon Hill (Leicester)

Manchester City won 3–1 on aggregate

== Final ==
2 March 1974
15:30 GMT

Manchester City	1–2	Wolverhampton Wanderers
Bell 59'		Hibbitt 44'; Richards 85'

Wembley Stadium, London
Attendance: 97,886
Referee: Dave Wallace (Crewe)
