= Mel Eves =

English footballer (born 1956)

Personal information
- Full name: Melvyn James Eves
- Date of birth: 10 September 1956 (age 70)
- Place of birth: Darlaston, England
- Position: Forward

Senior career*
Years	Team	Apps	(Gls)
1975–1984	Wolverhampton Wanderers	180	(44)
1984	→ Huddersfield Town (loan)	7	(4)
1984–1986	Sheffield United	26	(10)
1986–1988	Gillingham	27	(9)
1988	→ Mansfield Town (loan)	3	(0)
1988–1989	Walsall	0	(0)
1988–1989	→ King's Lynn (loan)		
1989	→ Cheltenham Town (loan)	1	(0)
1989	Willenhall Town	2	(0)
1989–1990	Telford United	21	(3)
Total		243	(67)

International career
1978	England B	3	(1)
- * Club domestic league appearances and goals

Melvyn James Eves (born 10 September 1956) is an English former professional footballer who had a long career playing as a striker and left-sided attacker, mostly known for his time with Wolverhampton Wanderers.

== Career ==
Eves, born in the Miners Arms pub Darlaston and brought up in the Red Lion in Wednesfield was educated at Wolverhampton Grammar School from 1968 to 1975 when he represented England as a Schoolboy International before joining Wolves who he had supported as a boy.

He eventually made his debut at the age of 21 on 26 November 1977 against Ipswich Town at Molineux in the First Division.

After making four appearances following the Ipswich debut, Eves did not feature again until late spring. His first goal was at Chelsea in April 1978, followed by the winner against Manchester United in the following game and a goal in victory over Aston Villa afterwards.

Eves was interviewed about his Old Gold memories by the club for a "Wolves Scrapbook" edition where he talked through his first club goal.

"It was against Chelsea at a Stamford Bridge. I've actually got a picture of the goal at home. Ray Wilkins, the Chelsea captain, just couldn't get to me in time and the ball went into the top corner, past England goalkeeper, Peter Bonetti. We drew 1-1 and that was the equaliser, so it got us a point at Stamford Bridge." Stated Eves in 2020.

Such a run saw him earn a spot in the England B team's summer tour of 1978, managed by Sir Bobby Robson, where he made three appearances and scored one goal (in a record 8-0 success over Singapore's full team).

In Eves' words "I'd finished the League season well with goals against Chelsea, Manchester United and Villa. We needed some points at that time to be sure of staying up, so I was on a bit of a high. I remember flying out to New Zealand with Tommy Langley, who was also called up late. I didn't previously know him.... I remember being jet-lagged when we started playing but my main feeling was that it was great to be there and to be getting some recognition from my country." Eves also has a framed photo of his England B goal versus Singapore in his office.

Eves reward for his late season form and his spell represented England B was a three-year contract with the club which would take him to the end 80-81 season.

Eves scored some keys goals during the 1979–80 season, including a particularly nice goal at Old Trafford in a 1–0 victory allowing Wolves to secure the double over Manchester United having beaten them at the Molineux 3–1 that season.

In his own words, "We were the only team to do the double over United that season and the only away side to win at their place. We had a terrific away record at that time and stopped them winning the League title really as they finished second, two points behind Liverpool."

In an interview for local newspaper, Eves recalls. "I remember I played a one-two with John Richards just over 25 yards out, took a touch inside and hit it from just outside the box low to Gary Bailey's right, but he didn't really move and it fizzed into the net. The ground almost fell silent for a second as it was a case of 'what have Wolves done?' because it came a bit out of the blue."

The victory that silenced the Old Trafford crowd was ceetwinly out of the blue. Wolves would not repeat the 1980 away win until 2022 when a Joao Moutinho goal secured their next away victory at Manchester United. Eves, who was commentating on the match atvthe time stated his pride in the Wolves performance that day noting that "Wolves had outplayed United, just as they had 42 years previously".

Eves formed a partnership with several key players of the era including John Richards who was the club's all time top scorer until Steve Bull surpassed his record. (Richards remains 2nd on this list whilst Eves sits 32nd).

"He played a full part when we won the League Cup..... and, of course, scored an important goal in the second leg of the semi-final at home to Swindon."

That important goal was discussed when Eves was interviewed for Wolves based podcast The Wolfwhistle and he describes it as a lucky overhead kick from the edge of the box that "just sailed into the net" and would come just 7 days after the Manchester United game.

The cup run would take Wolves to the final where Eves helped Wolves win silverware with Wolves' 1980 League Cup final triumph over then-European Cup holders Nottingham Forest at Wembley where he played the full 90 minutes.

Wolves finished the season in 6th place in the top tier.

Wolves played in Europe in 1980 and Eves was the last Wolves player to score in a European competition for Wolves until Ruben Vinagre ended that long wait during the 2019–20 Nuno Espirito led Europa League campaign, scoring the winner against PSV in the second leg 1–0 victory in the UEFA Cup tie at Molineux in 1980 (Wolves went out of the competition having lost the first leg 3-1 in Eindhoven)

He was top goalscorer in 1981–82 (seven goals) as Wolves slumped out of the top flight, but his 18 league goal haul the following year, not only earned him the top goalscorer award again, but saw the team immediately return to Division One during the 1982–83 season.

Eves played his final Wolves match against Watford, 5 May 1984 where he ruptured achilles tendon being replaced with Danny Crainie in the 19th minute. He undertook an operation in London where he states he received no visitors from the Wolves and when he returned to club on crutches, foot in plaster, he met with new manager Tommy Docherty who offered him a contract at reduced salary. According to Eves the atmosphere at the club had become awful, there was little leadership. He stated in a podcast interview with Wolves fan site the Wolfwhistle "I didn't know what the owners looked like. Unless a club is run properly from the top it's never going to achieve".

Eves left the club having played in a total of 214 games for Wolves scoring 53 goals in all competitions.

Eves now works as a football pundit on the radio and in newspapers. He contributes his thoughts on the BBC Radio WM radio commentaries for Wolves games. He also writes for the Express & Star.

== Playing Style ==
Whilst Eves would boast favourable goals per game record in the first team, he believes he could have secured more during his time but due to the quality Wolves already had up front, he was often used as a winger. He describes himself as being pacey and wiry (lively).

Discussing playing style of the 1979-89 season Eves recalls: "That season we won 3-2 at Everton, 3-2 at Arsenal, and we beat Man United 1-0 away and I scored there. We won about 11 games away from home. We did very well away because we'd got players who could score from a lot of positions. I was probably third top scorer. If they had had the Pro Zone figures then, I'd loved to have known how far I ran in a game. I was expected to track back every time and if I didn't I would know about it."

== Player Coach & Agent ==
Following his retirement from playing football, Eves moved into becoming a player agent with his company "Eleven Sports" helping guide the careers of several players and became a fully qualified performance coach.

Eves helped facilitate deals to bring prominent Italians to the football league through his agency including Fabrizio Ravanelli and Benito Carbone.

Eves stated that his biggest satisfaction was "getting the potential out of the player, getting them where they could be, even when others didn't believe. Robert Earnshaw, for example, was playing in League Two before going right through the divisions, scoring a hat-trick in every one. He scored a hat-trick as an international for Wales too, along with ones in the FA Cup and League Cup."

Eves is also a published author, with his book "The 3 'E's: How to Achieve Optimum Performance" listed as available on Amazon. Eves believes the philosophy and coaching of this style helped with the upturn in for of Doncaster Rovers when he was working there.

== Charity Work ==
After retirement from professional football, Eves had worked as the player manager for a team consisting of retired professionals who had made appearances for the Wolves, named the "Wolves Allstars". Arranging for the former players to make appearances alongside each other in matches, often against other Midland based clubs retired players (examples; Walsall and Aston Villa) and raising money for local Wolverhampton based charities. Eves boasts to have raised more than £250,000 for local charities and was active in this role before stepping down in 2011.

Eves' Wolves Allstars held a special fundraising match in 2010 for victims of the Haiti Earthquake.

The work he carries out has includes tours of the Wolves stadium and facilities among other things. In Eve's words the scheme aims to provide "somewhere ex-offenders can come where they know they won't be judged, they can get whatever support they want and decide which activities they want to take part in. But most of all, it gives many of our participants a reason to get out of bed in the morning."

== Honours ==
Wolverhampton Wanderers

- Football League Cup: 1979–80
