= Peter Daniel (footballer, born 1955) =

English former professional football player and now club manager

Personal information
- Full name: Peter William Daniel
- Date of birth: 12 December 1955 (age 70)
- Place of birth: Hull, England
- Height: 5 ft 9 in (1.75 m)
- Position: Midfielder

Youth career
- 1969–1973: Hull City

Senior career*
Years	Team	Apps	(Gls)
1973–1978	Hull City	113	(9)
1978–1984	Wolverhampton Wanderers	157	(13)
1984	Minnesota Strikers	14	(0)
1984–1985	Sunderland	34	(0)
1985–1987	Lincoln City	55	(2)
1987–1989	Burnley	41	(0)
Total		414	(23)

International career
1977–1978	England U21	7	(1)

Managerial career
- 1987: Lincoln City (player/manager)
- 1990–1993: North Ferriby United
- Pontefract Collieries
- Winterton Rangers
- Denaby United
- 2000–2001: Goole
- –2003: Pontefract Collieries
- 2004–2009: Winterton Rangers
- 2009–2010: Ossett Town
- 2011–2012: Brigg Town
- * Club domestic league appearances and goals

Peter William Daniel (born 12 December 1955 in Hull) is an English former professional football player and now club manager. His last known appointment was as manager of non-league side Brigg Town.

== Career ==
Daniel joined his local club Hull City on schoolboy forms in 1969, becoming an apprentice in 1971, and finally turning professional in September 1973. He played five seasons at Boothferry Park in the Second Division.

He played seven times for the England Under 21 side while with Hull, making his debut on 27 April 1977 in a 1–0 win over Scotland U21 at Bramall Lane.

In May 1978, he was transferred to First Division Wolverhampton Wanderers for a fee of £182,000. Here, he was converted from a full-back into a defensive midfielder and won a League Cup winners' medal in 1980, gaining an assist in the goal that defeated Nottingham Forest. In total, he made 194 appearances for the Midlands club, scoring 16 times.

In May 1984, he moved to NASL side Minnesota Strikers, returning to England in August that year, costing Sunderland £15,000. He played in the 1985 League Cup Final for Sunderland, this time picking up a runners-up medal.

In November 1985, Daniel moved to Lincoln City and was appointed player-manager in March 1987. He failed to stop Lincoln sliding down the Fourth Division, with the club becoming the first to suffer automatic relegation to the Conference at the end of season after losing their last game away to Swansea City. Lincoln had been in seventh place and in a play-off position in the previous January.

He resigned in May 1987 and in July that year joined Burnley as a player. Whilst at Burnley he played against his former club Wolves in the 1988 Football League Trophy Final at Wembley, collecting a runners up medal. He left Burnley and league football in 1989, joining North Ferriby United.

== Non-league management ==
He was manager of North Ferriby United between 1990 and 1993. He later managed Pontefract Colleries, Winterton Rangers and Denaby United before being appointed manager of Goole in November 2000 (from where he was sacked in September 2001). He later returned to manage Pontefract, but resigned in December 2003.

=== Winterton Rangers ===
In November 2004 he was appointed manager of Winterton Rangers for a second time, his first match in charge being the Northern Counties East Football League Division One 2–2 home with Lincoln Moorlands on 17 November 2004. He guided the club to promotion, as runners-up to Parkgate, in the 2006–07 season and then to be champions of the Northern Counties East League Premier Division the following season when they also won the league cup. Injuries hampered the club during the 2008–09 season but they still managed a creditable fifth place in the league whilst also reaching the league cup semi final and Lincolnshire County Senior Trophy final and a League Cup semi final and County Cup Final. Despite this, Daniel elected to leave the club at the end of the season.

=== Ossett Town ===
He was appointed manager of Ossett Town in December 2009, with the club achieving its first point in five games in his first league match in charge – a 2–2 draw at Kendal Town on 5 December 2009. However, after just nine matches in charge, with a 3–0 home victory over Durham City on 6 February 2010 being his solitary victory and the club seven points adrift of safety, Daniel resigned from the post following a 3–1 defeat at Worksop Town on 6 March 2010.

=== Brigg Town ===
In May 2011 he was appointed manager of Brigg Town.

== Honours ==
Wolverhampton Wanderers

- Football League Cup: 1979–80

Sunderland

- Football League Cup runner-up: 1984–85

Burnley

- Associate Members' Cup runner-up: 1987–88
