= David Butler (footballer, born 1962) =

English footballer

Personal information
- Date of birth: 1 September 1962 (age 64)
- Place of birth: Wolverhampton, England
- Position: Winger

Youth career
- 19xx–1981: Wolverhampton Wanderers

Senior career*
Years	Team	Apps	(Gls)
1981–1982	Torquay United	6	(0)
1982–19xx	Stafford Rangers	?	(?)
Total		?	(?)
- * Club domestic league appearances and goals

David Butler (born 1 September 1962) is an English former professional footballer who played as winger.

== Career ==
Born in Wolverhampton, Butler played youth football for hometown club Wolverhampton Wanderers, before turning professional with Torquay United. Butler made 6 appearances for Torquay in the Football League during the 1981–82 season. He later played non-League football for Stafford Rangers.
