= Kenny Hibbitt =

English football player and manager (born 1951)

Personal information
- Full name: Kenneth Hibbitt
- Date of birth: 3 January 1951 (age 75)
- Place of birth: Bradford, England
- Height: 5 ft 11 in (1.80 m)
- Position: Midfielder

Senior career*
Years	Team	Apps	(Gls)
1967–1968	Bradford Park Avenue	15	(0)
1968–1984	Wolverhampton Wanderers	466	(89)
1982	→ Seattle Sounders (loan)	14	(4)
1984–1986	Coventry City	47	(4)
1986–1988	Bristol Rovers	53	(5)
Total		581	(98)

International career
1970	England U23	1	(0)

Managerial career
- 1990–1994: Walsall
- 1995–1996: Cardiff City
- 1996: Cardiff City
- 1996–1998: Cardiff City
- 2001–2002: Hednesford Town
- * Club domestic league appearances and goals

Kenneth Hibbitt (born 3 January 1951) is an English former professional footballer who played in the Football League for Bradford Park Avenue, Wolverhampton Wanderers, Coventry City and Bristol Rovers, and in the North American Soccer League for the Seattle Sounders. He was capped once for England at under-23 level. As a manager, he took charge of Walsall, Cardiff City and Hednesford Town. He is most known for his time at Wolverhampton Wanderers, for whom he played from 1968 to 1984.

== Playing career ==
=== Background and Bradford Park Avenue ===
His older brother Terry was a professional footballer. Kenny Hibbitt started his senior career with his home town club Bradford Park Avenue. He then left for £5,000 in November 1968.

=== Wolverhampton Wanderers ===
Hibbitt joined Wolverhampton Wanderers debuting as a substitute in a 1–0 defeat to rivals West Bromwich Albion on 12 April 1969. He did not feature again though until 12 September 1970, when he scored his first of many goals in a 2–2 draw at Chelsea. During his time at Molineux Hibbitt won the League Cup in 1974 and 1980 scoring in the 1974 final. He played in the 1972 UEFA Cup final where the club lost narrowly to countrymen Tottenham Hotspur. He also helped the club win two promotions back to the top flight.

He finally left Wolves in 1984 on a free transfer. In total, he played 544 games for Wolves, scoring 114 goals; the second most appearances a player has made in Wolves history. In 2011 he was inducted to the Wolverhampton Wanderers 'Hall of Fame'.

=== Coventry City ===
Hibbitt joined Coventry City in 1984. He spent two seasons at Highfield Road.

=== Bristol Rovers ===
Hibbitt joined Bristol Rovers in 1986. There his playing career came to an abrupt halt in February 1988 when he broke his leg playing against Sunderland. He remained with the Rovers after this as assistant to manager Gerry Francis. They won the Division 3 title for 1989-90.

== Managerial career ==
=== Walsall ===
Hibbitt was appointed manager of Walsall in 1990. He took them to the Division 3 play-offs in 1993–94.

=== Cardiff City ===
Hibbitt took over as manager of Cardiff City from Eddie May in the summer of 1995. He moved upstairs to a director of football role with the arrival of Phil Neal the following year. However, Neal's time in charge was brief, departing after only a couple of months to become assistant to Steve Coppell at Manchester City. Hibbitt took over the team once again before handing the reins over to Russell Osman. Osman's period in charge was short however and in December 1996 Hibbitt took over team affairs for the third time, before being replaced by Frank Burrows in February 1998. The arrival of Burrows saw Hibbitt revert to his role as director of Football. His influence was now greatly diminished however, and at the end of the 1997–98 season he left the club altogether.

=== Later career ===
Hibbitt returned to management with non-league Hednesford Town in September 2001. Despite rescuing the club from a poor start and preserving their place in their division, he was dismissed at the end of the season.

He later worked for the Premier League, reviewing the performances of the referees. He also assists in training local football team Kingswood who play in the Gloucestershire County League.

== Honours ==
Wolverhampton Wanderers

- Football League Second Division: 1976–77; promotion 1982–83
- Football League Cup: 1973–74, 1979–80
- Texaco Cup: 1970–71
- UEFA Cup runner-up: 1971–72

Seattle Sounders

- Soccer Bowl finalist: 1982
- NASL Western Division: 1982
