= Dennis Leman =

English footballer

Personal information
- Full name: Dennis Leman
- Date of birth: 1 December 1954 (age 71)
- Place of birth: Newcastle-upon-Tyne, England
- Position: Midfielder

Senior career*
Years	Team	Apps	(Gls)
1973–1976	Manchester City	17	(1)
1976–1982	Sheffield Wednesday	104	(9)
1982	→ Wrexham (loan)	17	(1)
1982–1984	Scunthorpe United	38	(3)
- Burton Albion
Total		176	(14)

International career
1970	England Schoolboys	8	(2)
- * Club domestic league appearances and goals

Dennis Leman (born 1 December 1954) is a footballer who played as a midfielder in the Football League for Manchester City, Sheffield Wednesday, Wrexham and Scunthorpe United.
