= Dave Wintersgill =

English footballer

Personal information
- Full name: David Wintersgill
- Date of birth: 19 September 1965 (age 61)
- Place of birth: Northallerton, England
- Height: 5 ft 11 in (1.80 m)
- Position: Midfielder

Youth career
- Wolverhampton Wanderers

Senior career*
Years	Team	Apps	(Gls)
1982–1984	Wolverhampton Wanderers	4	(0)
1984	→ Chester City (loan)	5	(0)
1984	Wimbledon	0	(0)
	Bradford City	0	(0)
1985	Gresley Rovers		
1985	TP-Seinäjoki		(21)
1985	Scarborough	14	
1985–1986	Malvern Town		
1986	TP-Seinäjoki	20	(15)
1986–1987	Darlington	17	(1)
1987	TP-Seinäjoki	12	(6)
1987–1989	Bishop Auckland		
1989–1990	Colne Dynamoes		
199?–19??	Guisborough Town		
- * Club domestic league appearances and goals

David Wintersgill (born 19 September 1965) is an English former footballer who played as a midfielder in the Football League for Wolverhampton Wanderers, Chester City and Darlington.

He was also on the books of Wimbledon and Bradford City without playing League football for either. He spent three seasons playing for TP-Seinäjoki in the lower divisions of Finnish football, and played non-league football in England for Gresley Rovers, Scarborough, Malvern Town, Bishop Auckland, Colne Dynamoes, and Guisborough Town.

After finishing with full-time football, he began what became a long career in the prison service.
