= Andy Gray (footballer, born 1955) =

Scottish football commentator

Andrew Gray
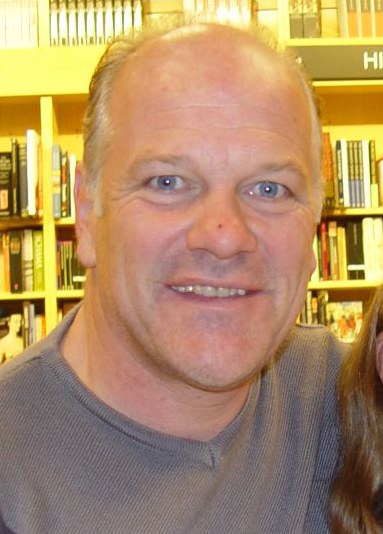
- Gray in 2004

Personal information
- Full name: Andrew Mullen Gray
- Date of birth: 30 November 1955 (age 70)
- Place of birth: Glasgow, Scotland
- Height: 5 ft 11 in (1.80 m)
- Position: Striker

Youth career
- 1970–1973: Clydebank Strollers

Senior career*
Years	Team	Apps	(Gls)
1973–1975	Dundee United	62	(36)
1975–1979	Aston Villa	115	(54)
1979–1983	Wolverhampton Wanderers	133	(38)
1983–1985	Everton	49	(14)
1985–1987	Aston Villa	54	(5)
1987	→ Notts County (loan)	4	(0)
1987–1988	West Bromwich Albion	35	(10)
1988–1989	Rangers	14	(5)
1989–1990	Cheltenham Town	20	(7)
Total		513	(185)

International career
1975–1985	Scotland	20	(7)
- * Club domestic league appearances and goals

Andrew Mullen Gray (born 30 November 1955) is a Scottish football broadcaster and former player.

He played as a forward for Dundee United, Aston Villa, Wolverhampton Wanderers, Everton, Aston Villa, Notts County (on loan), West Bromwich Albion, Rangers and Cheltenham Town. He won 20 caps for Scotland. He also had a season as Ron Atkinson's assistant at Aston Villa when he retired from playing, juggling that role with his Sky Sports duties. He decided to go into broadcasting full time in 1993.

Gray was the lead football pundit for Sky Sports (since it began its broadcast of the Premier League in August 1992) and was the channel's co-commentator for nearly 19 years (often working alongside Martin Tyler) until his dismissal in January 2011, following multiple allegations of sexism. Gray, along with former Sky Sports anchor Richard Keys, then signed for Talksport in February 2011. They both now work for beIN Sports in Doha, Qatar; since June 2013 they have been the main presenters of Premier League and UEFA Champions League match broadcasts within the Middle East and North Africa region. They were expected to leave the network at the end of the 2025/26 Premier League season.

== Club career ==
Born in Glasgow and with a mother from the Isle of Lewis, Gray started his professional career as a player with Dundee United, where he scored 36 goals in 62 appearances He also played for Dundee United in the 1974 Scottish Cup Final finishing on the losing side as Celtic ran out 3–0 winners.

In October 1975, at the age of 19, he moved south to Aston Villa (newly promoted to the First Division) for £110,000 and was joint winner of England's golden boot with Arsenal's Malcolm Macdonald in 1976–77. His 29 goals helped Villa to a fourth-place finish and victory in the League Cup, and earned him the PFA Young Player of the Year and PFA Players' Player of the Year awards, a double matched by Cristiano Ronaldo in 2009 and Gareth Bale in 2013. At the time he was the youngest player to earn the Players' Player of the Year award, and the first player to win more than one of the official three player of the year awards in the same season.

Gray moved to Villa's local rivals Wolverhampton Wanderers on 8 September 1979. His signing was announced to the fans and media prior to Wolves' kick off at home to Crystal Palace, as a pre match celebration at the Molineux for an English record transfer fee of £1.49m. After scoring the winning goal for Wolves in the 1980 League Cup final, he remained with the club through their relegation in 1982 (despite interest from Manchester United) and promotion a year later.

Gray moved to Everton in November 1983 for £250,000. He spent two seasons with the Merseyside club, winning the FA Cup in May 1984. Gray scored in the final against Watford in controversial fashion by heading the ball out of the Watford's goalkeeper's hands. A year later, he won the League Championship and European Cup Winners' Cup, also scoring in the final of the latter. He also reached another FA Cup final, but this time he was on the losing side as Everton were defeated by Manchester United. Then came the arrival of England striker Gary Lineker from Leicester City in the 1985 close season. Despite angry petitions from Everton fans wanting to keep Gray at Goodison Park, he left the club on 10 July 1985, returning to Aston Villa in a £150,000 deal.

Despite starting the decade on a high as league champions in 1981 and European Cup winners in 1982, Villa had now declined to mid table mediocrity and the return of Gray was unable to turn things around as his arrival at Everton had done. He scored five goals from 35 league games in 1985–86 as Villa narrowly avoided relegation to the Second Division, and the following season he didn't score in 19 league games as Villa fell into the Second Division. He began the 1987–88 season still with Villa, but was transferred to their local rivals West Bromwich Albion in September 1987 having not featured in a first team game for Villa that season. His spell at Albion lasted less than a year, and was uneventful as they narrowly avoided relegation from the Second Division.

In mid-1988, he joined Rangers. He spent one season at Ibrox, helping them win the Scottish Premier Division title – the first of nine successive titles they would win. He dropped into non-league football with Football Conference club Cheltenham Town in summer 1989, and scored his first goal for the club in a 2–0 home win over Chorley on 21 October 1989, before retiring in 1990.

== International career ==
Gray's Player of the Year accolades in England were surprisingly not enough to convince Scotland manager Ally MacLeod to select him for the 1978 World Cup squad. Gray won 20 caps for Scotland, scoring 7 goals for his country. He also won four caps at Under-23 level and played at schoolboy level. The 20 year-old's full international debut came on 17 December 1975 in a 1–1 draw with Romania. He was not selected for any of Scotland's World Cup squads during his playing days. His final senior appearance for Scotland came on 28 May 1985 in a 1–0 win over Iceland in a 1986 World Cup qualifier. This had been his first cap for two years, despite him scoring twice in his penultimate appearance for the national side on 19 June 1983 in a 2–0 friendly win over Canada, and him excelling on the club level for Everton after his transfer to the Merseyside club later in 1983.

== Coaching ==
After retiring as a player, Gray entered coaching as an assistant to Ron Atkinson at Aston Villa before focusing full-time on his television work. In 1997, Gray was offered the Everton manager's job, but rejected it in order to continue his TV career with Sky.

== Commentary career ==
Gray appeared as a pundit on ITV's World Cup coverage in 1978 and during the mid-1980s he appeared fairly regularly on the BBC's coverage, including at the 1986 World Cup. Towards the end of his playing career, he worked as a pundit on STV in Scotland, where he worked alongside Andy Melvin, the producer who would eventually take him to Sky Sports.

After leaving coaching, Gray became a football commentator, pundit, and analyst on Sky Sports, serving as a Scottish facet of its Premier League coverage since its inception in 1992, most notably alongside studio anchor Richard Keys and lead match commentators Martin Tyler and Ian Darke. In addition, he reported for Sky from Euro 2004 in Portugal, although Sky did not have broadcast rights for the games. He commentated for BBC Radio 5 Live in the 2002 World Cup and for ESPN in Euro 2008. Gray also provides betting tips for Betfair, and also provided commentary for the EA Sports's FIFA of video games along with John Motson and Des Lynam in FIFA: Road to World Cup 98 (being replaced with Mark Lawrenson in the following game) and Clive Tyldesley and Martin Tyler from FIFA 06 to FIFA 11, until being replaced in FIFA 12 by Sky Sports pundit Alan Smith.

In January 2011, Gray was forced to apologise for comments he made about a female assistant referee, Sian Massey, in a Premier League match. Believing that his microphone was switched off, Gray commented to co-host Richard Keys: "Can you believe that? A female linesman. Women don't know the offside rule." Keys replied: "Course they don't." The comments were criticised by Sky Sports, football fans and the Football Association. On 24 January it was announced that both Gray and Keys would be banned for one game. On 25 January 2011, it was announced his contract was being terminated for unacceptable behaviour. Barney Francis, Sky Sports' managing director, said Gray was dismissed "in response to new evidence of unacceptable and offensive behaviour in an off-air incident that took place in December 2010". The Daily Telegraph suggested that the Sky statement refers directly to a clip of Gray and Charlotte Jackson in rehearsals for the Sky Sports Christmas Special. While Jackson is attaching a microphone pack, Gray lifts his belt and says: "Charlotte, can you tuck this down here for me?"

Gray's former teammate at Everton Peter Reid suggested that Gray's dismissal may have been connected to a legal battle between Gray and the former title News of the World (both it and Sky were owned by News Corporation at the time) over phone-tapping.

In late 2011 Keys and Gray appeared in Smash It!, a show designed for the corporate hospitality circuit. The title of the show came from sexual remarks that Keys had made to Jamie Redknapp. An earlier theatre tour in 2011 had to be cancelled due to poor ticket sales. He previously presented a Friday evening Talksport show with sidekick Richard Keys.

Since June 2013, Andy Gray, alongside Richard Keys, has been presenting the Premier League football coverage on beIN Sports. In early February 2026 news broke that Gray and Keys are expected to leave the network at the end of the current Premier League season.

On 25 January 2014, Gray returned to commentating on British television on BT Sport for an FA Cup match between Stevenage and Everton. His appearance occurred three years to the day since his dismissal by Sky. He then commentated alongside Darren Fletcher for the Arsenal v Liverpool match in the next round.

== Personal life ==
Gray has been married twice, and has five children by four different women.

Gray is a supporter of football clubs Rangers FC and Everton FC.

== Career statistics ==
=== International appearances ===
Appearances and goals by national team and year
National team	Year	Apps	Goals
Scotland	1975	1	0
Scotland	1976	3	2
Scotland	1977	—	
Scotland	1978	2	1
Scotland	1979	—	
Scotland	1980	4	1
Scotland	1981	4	0
Scotland	1982	—	
Scotland	1983	5	3
Scotland	1984	—	
Scotland	1985	1	0
Total		20	7

=== International goals ===
(NB scores and results list Scotland's goal tally first)

Goal	Date	Venue	Opponent	Score	Result	Competition
1	8 September 1976	Hampden Park, Glasgow	Finland	4–0	6–0	Friendly
2	8 September 1976	Hampden Park, Glasgow	Finland	6–0	6–0	Friendly
3	20 September 1978	Praterstadion, Vienna	Austria	2–3	2–3	ECQG2
4	26 March 1980	Hampden Park, Glasgow	Portugal	2–0	4–1	ECQG2
5	28 May 1983	Ninian Park, Cardiff	Wales	1–0	2–0	BHC
6	19 June 1983	Varsity Stadium, Toronto	Canada	1–0	2–0	Friendly
7	19 June 1983	Varsity Stadium, Toronto	Canada	2–0	2–0	Friendly

== Honours ==
Aston Villa

- Football League Cup: 1976–77

Wolverhampton Wanderers

- Football League Cup: 1979–80

Everton

- Football League First Division: 1984–85
- FA Cup: 1983–84; runner-up: 1984–85
- FA Charity Shield: 1984
- European Cup Winners' Cup: 1984–85

Rangers

- Scottish Premier Division: 1988–89
