= Colin Brazier (footballer) =

English footballer

Personal information
- Full name: Colin James Brazier
- Date of birth: 6 June 1957 (age 69)
- Place of birth: Solihull, England
- Height: 6 ft 2 in (1.88 m)
- Position: Central defender

Youth career
- –: Northfield Town
- 1973–1975: Wolverhampton Wanderers

Senior career*
Years	Team	Apps	(Gls)
1975–1982	Wolverhampton Wanderers	78	(2)
1981–1982	Jacksonville Tea Men	42	(0)
1982–1983	Birmingham City	11	(1)
1983	AP Leamington	1	(0)
1983	Lincoln City	9	(0)
1983–1986	Walsall	115	(4)
1986–1990	Kidderminster Harriers	80	(1)
1990–1995	Tamworth		

International career
1987	England C	1	(0)
- * Club domestic league appearances and goals

Colin James Brazier (born 6 June 1957) is an English former professional footballer who played as a defender in the Football League for Wolverhampton Wanderers, Birmingham City, Lincoln City and Walsall, and in the North American Soccer League for the Jacksonville Tea Men.

== Career ==
Brazier began his career with Wolverhampton Wanderers as an apprentice in 1973, turning professional two years later, and made his senior debut on 2 February 1977 in a 1–0 win over Ipswich Town in the FA Cup. Although he managed 91 appearances for the team over five seasons, he was never able to become a regular player. His best run of games came in the latter half of the 1979–80 season; he was included in the matchday squad for the 1980 League Cup Final at Wembley, but ended up as an unused substitute as Wolves defeated Nottingham Forest. He played his last game for the club in February 1982.

He joined Birmingham City in October 1982 after completing his second season playing for the Jacksonville Tea Men in the North American Soccer League, but left the club a few months later after a disagreement with the manager. He played one game for AP Leamington and ended the season with Lincoln City. He spent three seasons back in the Midlands with Walsall before joining Conference club Kidderminster Harriers. With Kidderminster, Brazier won the FA Trophy in 1987, reached the final of the 1989 Welsh Cup, and was capped by the England semi-professional team. He finished his career at Tamworth.

== Honours ==
Lincoln City

- Football League Group Cup runner-up: 1982–83
