= Andy Rowland (footballer, born 1954) =

English footballer (1954–2024)

Personal information
- Full name: Andrew Arthur Rowland
- Date of birth: 8 September 1954
- Place of birth: Derby, England
- Date of death: 20 June 2024 (aged 69)
- Height: 5 ft 11 in (1.80 m)
- Positions: Forward; defender

Senior career*
Years	Team	Apps	(Gls)
1972–1974	Derby County	0	(0)
1974–1978	Bury	174	(59)
1978–1986	Swindon Town	287	(79)
Total		461	(138)

International career
1973	England Youth	1	(3)
- * Club domestic league appearances and goals

Andrew Arthur Rowland (8 September 1954 – 20 June 2024) was an English footballer who played for Derby County, Bury and Swindon Town.

== Death ==
Rowland died on 20 June 2024, at the age of 69.

== Honours ==
Swindon Town

- Football League Fourth Division: 1985–86
