= Hugh Atkinson (footballer) =

Irish former professional footballer

Personal information
- Full name: Hugh Anthony Atkinson
- Date of birth: 8 November 1960 (age 65)
- Place of birth: Dublin, Ireland
- Position: Defender

Youth career
- Belvedere

Senior career*
Years	Team	Apps	(Gls)
1978–1982	Wolverhampton Wanderers	46	(3)
1982–1984	Exeter City	28	(1)
1984–1985	York City	7	(0)
1985	→ Darlington (loan)	7	(0)
1985–1986	Harrisons		
1986–1987	Friar Lane Old Boys		
1987	Gresley Rovers	4	(1)

International career
1981	Republic of Ireland U21	1	(0)
- * Club domestic league appearances and goals

Hugh Anthony Atkinson (born 8 November 1960) is an Irish former professional footballer who played as a defender.

== Career ==
Atkinson moved from his native Ireland to join the youth ranks at Wolverhampton Wanderers in 1978. He later made his senior debut on 12 January 1980 in a 3–0 win over Bristol City.

The 1980–81 season was his most successful at Molineux, as he made 27 appearances. After the club were relegated from the First Division at the end of the following season amid financial turmoil, he left to join Exeter City, after 51 appearances and 3 goals for the club in total.

He experienced another relegation at Exeter as the club dropped into the fourth tier in 1984, upon which he moved on to York City, from where he had a loan spell at Darlington.
