= John Richards (footballer) =

English footballer

Personal information
- Date of birth: 9 November 1950 (age 75)
- Place of birth: Warrington, Lancashire, England
- Position: Striker

Senior career*
Years	Team	Apps	(Gls)
1969–1983	Wolverhampton Wanderers	385	(144)
1982–1983	→ Derby County (loan)	10	(2)
1983–1985	Marítimo	44	(23)
Total		439	(169)

International career
1972–1974	England Under-23	6	(1)
1973	England	1	(0)
1977	England Under-21	2	(0)
1978	England B	3	(0)
- * Club domestic league appearances and goals

John Peter Richards (born 9 November 1950) is an English retired professional international footballer, who played as a striker.

He spent almost all his career at Wolverhampton Wanderers Football Club, where he broke the club's goalscoring record, ending with 194 goals in his tally (later overtaken by Steve Bull).

During a fourteen-year association with Wolves he won two League Cups and also played in the first UEFA Cup Final in 1972. He was capped once by the England national team in 1973.

== Career ==
Richards signed for the Molineux club as a professional in July 1969 and made his debut on 28 February 1970 in a 3–3 draw at West Bromwich Albion. He scored his first league goal for Wolves the following season against Huddersfield Town on 19 September 1970.

In 1971–72, "King John" came of age, scoring 13 league goals and helping Wolves become runners-up in the UEFA Cup. The following season, he was even stronger, scoring 36 goals in total (his highest seasonal tally) and, in 1974, he scored the winning goal as the team beat Manchester City to win the League Cup. Richards was leading scorer for Wolves in six of the next seven seasons, culminating in winning a second League Cup medal in 1980 against Nottingham Forest.

During his time with the club, Richards became Wolves' all-time leading scorer with 194 goals in total, a record that was subsequently bettered by Steve Bull in 1992. However, he still holds the club record for the most FA Cup goals, with 24.

Richards eventually left the club and moved to Portugal in 1983, following a loan spell with Derby County. He played two seasons for C.S. Marítimo, helping the side to promotion.

Richards' goal-scoring prowess was rewarded with a single England cap, against Northern Ireland on 12 May 1973 at Goodison Park. The competition for international places was fierce and the acknowledged talent England possessed in the form of Kevin Keegan, Martin Chivers and Allan Clarke ensured Richards became a "one-cap wonder".

After retiring as a player, Richards went into local government in Wolverhampton and Cannock; later returning to Wolves as a director in 1994, then as managing director in 1997, a post he held until 2000. In 2009, he worked as operations director of Pitchcare, a Telford-based online service for groundsmen.

== Honours ==
Wolverhampton Wanderers

- Football League Cup: 1973–74, 1979–80
