= EFL Cup =

Football tournament

- EFL Cup logo used since the 2017–18 season
- Organiser(s): English Football League
- Founded: 1960; 66 years ago (as Football League Cup); 2016; 10 years ago (as EFL Cup)
- Region: England; Wales
- Teams: 92
- Qualifier for: UEFA Conference League
- Current champions: Manchester City (9th title)
- Most championships: Liverpool (10 titles)
- Broadcaster(s): Sky Sports; ITV Sport
- Website: efl.com/competitions/carabao-cup
- 2026–27 EFL Cup

The English Football League Cup, often referred to as the League Cup and officially known as the Carabao Cup as a result of a sponsorship deal with Carabao, is an annual knockout competition in men's domestic football in England.

Organised by the English Football League (EFL), it is open to any club within the top four levels of the English football league system (92 clubs in total) comprising the top-level Premier League, and the three divisions of the English Football League's own league competition (Championship, League One and League Two).

First held in 1960–61 as the Football League Cup, it is one of two major domestic knockout trophies in English football, alongside the FA Cup, and one of the three top-tier domestic football competitions in England, alongside the Premier League and FA Cup. It concludes in late February, long before the other two major competitions, both of which end in May. It was introduced by the league as a response to the increasing popularity of European football, and also as a means of challenging the Football Association's position of power by giving the League an additional asset in negotiations. It also took advantage of the roll-out of floodlights, allowing fixtures to be played as midweek evening games. With the renaming of the Football League as the English Football League in 2016, the tournament was rebranded as the EFL Cup from the 2016–17 season onwards.

The tournament is played over seven rounds, with single-leg ties throughout, except for the semi-finals, which have home and away legs. The final is held at Wembley Stadium, the only leg in the competition played at a neutral venue and on a weekend (Sunday). The first two rounds are split into North and South sections, and a system of byes based on league level ensures higher-ranked teams enter in later rounds and defers the entry of teams still involved in Europe.

Winners not only receive the EFL Cup (of which there have been three designs, the current one also being the original), but also qualify for European football. From 1966–67 until 1971–72 the winners received a place in the Inter-Cities Fairs Cup, from 1972–73 until the 2019–20 season in the UEFA Europa League (formerly the UEFA Cup) and since the 2020–21 season in the UEFA Conference League. Should the winner also qualify for Europe through other means at the end of the season, this place is transferred to the highest-placed Premier League team that has not already qualified for European competition. The most successful club in the competition is Liverpool, with 10 titles. The current champions are Manchester City, who defeated Arsenal in the 2026 final to claim their ninth title. Swansea City are the only Welsh team to win the title, doing so in the 2012–13 season.

== Status ==
Although the League Cup is one of the four domestic trophies attainable by English league teams, it is regarded as of lower prestige than the league title or the FA Cup. League Cup winners receive £100,000 prize money (awarded by the Football League) with the runners-up receiving £50,000, considered relatively insignificant to top-flight teams, compared to the £2 million prize money of the FA Cup, which is in turn eclipsed by the Premier League's television money (awarded on final league position) and consequent participation in the Champions League.

Some clubs have repeatedly fielded a weaker side in the competition, making the opportunity for giant-killing of the larger clubs more likely. Many teams in the Premier League, Arsenal and Manchester United in particular, have used the competition to give young players valuable big-game experience – but, if they subsequently reach the latter stages, they then field their strongest possible team.

When Carling opted out of renewing its sponsorship of the League Cup in 2011, one of the reasons for ending sponsorship cited by the company was the lack of prestige the Cup attracted, both from fans and from larger clubs.

However, in 2010, in response to Arsène Wenger's claim that a League Cup win would not end his trophy drought, Alex Ferguson described the trophy as worth winning. After a period of decline when the competition's future was regularly questioned, recent years have seen a revival in respect for the trophy, as the larger Premier League clubs have come to dominate the competition again, and the development nature of the competition has begun to be viewed as a positive for the clubs involved. Premier League giants Manchester City (7), Manchester United (5), Liverpool (5) and Chelsea (3) among them won 20 editions of the tournament between 2001 and 2026.

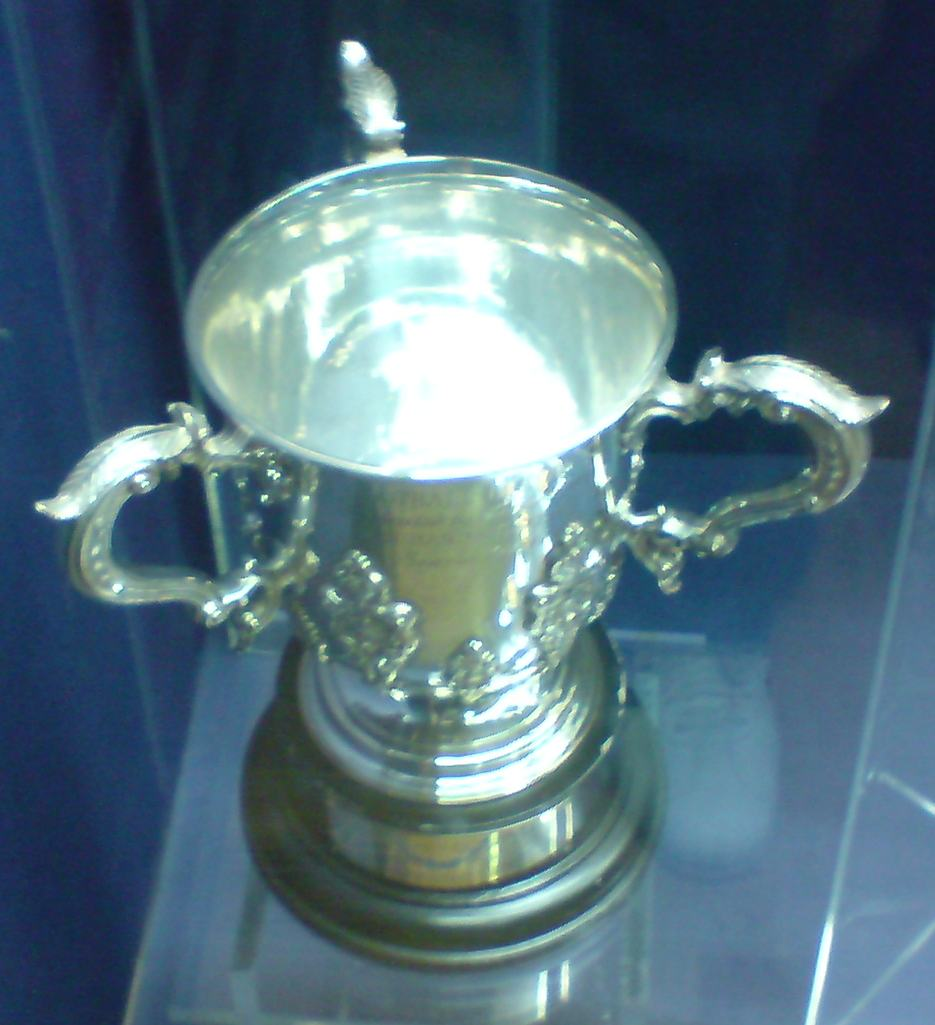
The League Cup

== History ==
Winners
Year	Winner
1961	Aston Villa (1)
1962	Norwich City (1)
1963	Birmingham City (1)
1964	Leicester City (1)
1965	Chelsea (1)
1966	West Bromwich Albion (1)
1967	Queens Park Rangers (1)
1968	Leeds United (1)
1969	Swindon Town (1)
1970	Manchester City (1)
1971	Tottenham Hotspur (1)
1972	Stoke City (1)
1973	Tottenham Hotspur (2)
1974	Wolves (1)
1975	Aston Villa (2)
1976	Manchester City (2)
1977	Aston Villa (3)
1978	Nottingham Forest (1)
1979	Nottingham Forest (2)
1980	Wolves (2)
1981	Liverpool (1)
1982	Liverpool (2)
1983	Liverpool (3)
1984	Liverpool (4)
1985	Norwich City (2)
1986	Oxford United (1)
1987	Arsenal (1)
1988	Luton Town (1)
1989	Nottingham Forest (3)
1990	Nottingham Forest (4)
1991	Sheffield Wednesday (1)
1992	Manchester United (1)
1993	Arsenal (2)
1994	Aston Villa (4)
1995	Liverpool (5)
1996	Aston Villa (5)
1997	Leicester City (2)
1998	Chelsea (2)
1999	Tottenham Hotspur (3)
2000	Leicester City (3)
2001	Liverpool (6)
2002	Blackburn Rovers (1)
2003	Liverpool (7)
2004	Middlesbrough (1)
2005	Chelsea (3)
2006	Manchester United (2)
2007	Chelsea (4)
2008	Tottenham Hotspur (4)
2009	Manchester United (3)
2010	Manchester United (4)
2011	Birmingham City (2)
2012	Liverpool (8)
2013	Swansea City (1)
2014	Manchester City (3)
2015	Chelsea (5)
2016	Manchester City (4)
2017	Manchester United (5)
2018	Manchester City (5)
2019	Manchester City (6)
2020	Manchester City (7)
2021	Manchester City (8)
2022	Liverpool (9)
2023	Manchester United (6)
2024	Liverpool (10)
2025	Newcastle United (1)
2026	Manchester City (9)

The original idea for a League Cup came from Stanley Rous, who saw the competition as a consolation for clubs who had already been knocked out of the FA Cup. However, it was not Rous who came to implement it, but Football League Secretary Alan Hardaker. Hardaker initially proposed the competition as a way for the clubs to make up for lost revenue due to a reduction in matches played, for when the league was to be reorganised. The reorganisation of the league was not immediately forthcoming; however, the cup competition was introduced regardless.

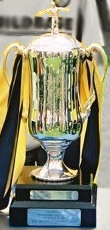
Trophy of the competition when it was known as the "Milk Cup"

The trophy was paid for personally by Football League President Joe Richards, who was proud of the competition, and he had his own name engraved on it. Richards described the competition's formation as an "interim step" on the way to the league's re-organisation. Richards' priority was the reorganisation of the leagues, "perhaps by cutting down the number of clubs in each division, as has already been suggested, and even given more consideration to the system of four up and four down".

Hardaker felt that the Football League needed to adapt to the times, as the English game was losing prestige. He felt that the Football League ought to take the lead in revitalising football in the nation: "It must be obvious to all of you that the time has come to do something, and it is up to the Football League to give the lead. I hope the Press will not immediately assume that the League is going to fall out with the F.A. or anybody else... the time have come for our voice to be heard in every problem which affects the professional game."

The League Cup competition was established at a time when match-day attendances were dwindling. The league had lost a million spectators compared to the previous season. It was established at a time when tensions between the Football League and The Football Association were high. The biggest disagreement was about how revenue was shared among the clubs.

During the late 1950s, the majority of senior English clubs equipped their grounds with floodlights. This opened up the opportunity to exploit weekday evenings throughout the winter. The League Cup was introduced in the 1960–61 season specifically as a mid-week floodlit tournament to replace the Southern Professional Floodlit Cup.

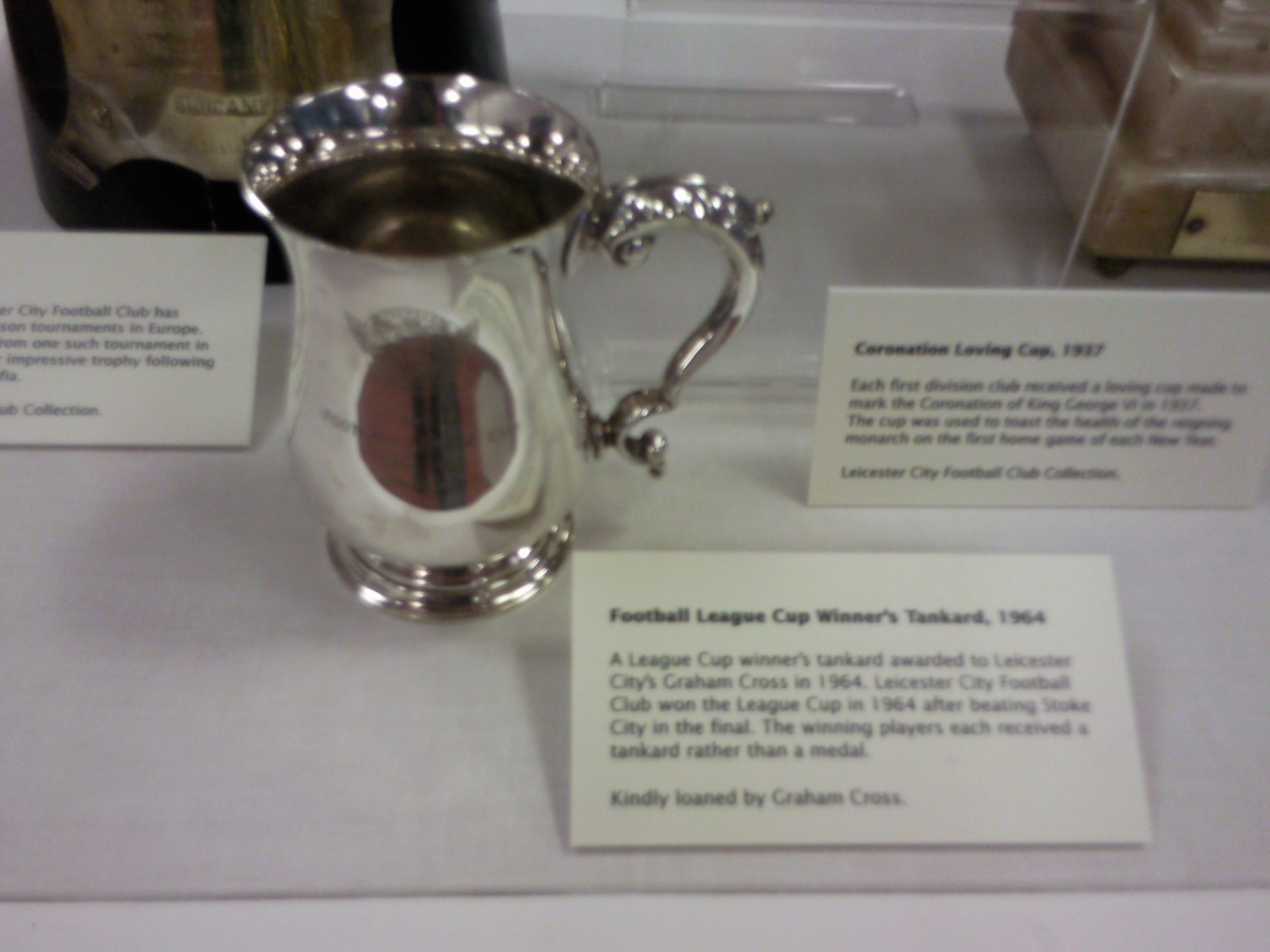
Rather than the traditional medal, each member of the League Cup-winning team used to receive a tankard. Today, winning players receive medals.

The League Cup was criticised by the better-endowed clubs. The Times' correspondent at the time felt that the League Cup was a step in the wrong direction; the European Cup had been formed five years prior to the League Cup and the correspondent felt the League Cup's introduction was adding to existing problems. The Times published on 30 May 1960: "Where a drastic reduction is required in an attempt to raise quality, no doubt quantity and a further spread of mediocrity will be the dose. Where men like Count Bernabeu with his wider horizons, think in terms of a European League for the future in which a lead could surely now be given jointly by our leaders, the Football League propose next season to implement their useless Football League Cup to be played in midweek. It gets the players, the clubs and the public nowhere."

Aston Villa were the inaugural winners in 1960–61, defeating Rotherham United 3–2 in the final over two legs. Football in England was considered to be of a low quality, compared to what was being played on the continent, as relatively unfashionable clubs Burnley and Wolverhampton Wanderers were England's representatives in Europe that year, having lifted the major honours ahead of much bigger clubs like Arsenal and Manchester United. Richards referred to the appetite for European football as 'continental fever'. He was keen for the league to re-establish itself: 'We must be prepared to put the interests of the League and the game before individual clubs.' Sixteen clubs opposed the competition's creation, while thirty-one approved it. The average attendance across the League Cup was 10,556, just higher than the average gate in the Third Division. The total attendance of the Football League competition had fallen by 4 million from the previous season. Richards is reputed to have told Hardaker that he foresaw 'the League Cup final being held at Wembley, but that it wouldn't be during his lifetime'. The first League Cup final to be held at Wembley was Third Division Queens Park Rangers' win over First Division West Bromwich Albion on 4 March 1967. Richards died in 1968.

The first League Cup was won in 1960–61 by Aston Villa who, at the time, held the overall record for major trophies won in England. The next three finals, however, saw the trophy won by clubs that had never previously won a major trophy. One of them, Norwich City, had yet to even play in the First Division, while their opponents Rochdale had played no higher than the Third Division.

The introduction of the League Cup gave the Football League more negotiating power with the FA and UEFA. Hardaker threatened UEFA with a boycott of the UEFA Cup, unless UEFA gave the League Cup winner European qualification. As a result of the negotiating tactics, UEFA provided the League Cup winner with a place in the European competitions, provided the team was in the first division. Tottenham Hotspur were the first team to qualify for Europe by virtue of winning the competition. Although Leeds United had won the competition before Tottenham, Leeds qualified for Europe based on league position. The winners of the 1966–67 and 1968–69 editions, Queen's Park Rangers and Swindon Town did not participate in Europe, as they were not in the First Division.

Prior to the agreement with UEFA, the competition was not considered worthy of the larger clubs' attention. However, once a position in Europe was on offer, as was a final at Wembley Stadium, the competition's standing was improved and in the 1968–69 season only Manchester United declined to participate. Everton chose not to compete in 1970–71 so that they could concentrate their efforts on the European Cup. Entry was made compulsory for all Football League teams the following year.

Liverpool have won the cup on the most occasions with ten victories, and both they and Manchester City have won four League Cups in successive years. Liverpool completed two trebles of trophy wins, in 1983–84 and 2000–01, winning the League Cup in both of these years.

English clubs lost their places in European competitions for an indefinite period in 1985 as a result of the Heysel disaster, where Liverpool fans had taken part in a riot at the European Cup final, resulting in the death of 39 spectators. That year's winners of the League Cup were Norwich City, who would otherwise have played in a European competition for the first time in the 1985–86 season. Oxford United, Arsenal, Luton Town and Nottingham Forest also missed out on the chance to compete in the UEFA Cup as League Cup holders over the next four years. Even when the ban was lifted in 1990, League Cup winners did not participate in European competitions for two more years, when Manchester United won the trophy and qualified for the UEFA Cup anyway, as they had finished second in the league. In the previous two seasons, Nottingham Forest and Sheffield Wednesday had both been prevented from competing in the UEFA Cup as League Cup winners, due to the gradual reintegration of English clubs in European competitions.

In 2016–17, the competition was renamed the EFL Cup as part of the Football League's rebranding to become the English Football League.

=== Modern changes ===
==== Perception ====
In the early 21st century, the League Cup was sometimes derided as a "Mickey Mouse" trophy by sections of the media and rival supporters, though others defended its status and significance to players and clubs.

From the late 2010s into the 2020s, several developments helped to bolster the competition's profile. In 2018, the EFL removed extra time from earlier rounds to reduce fixture congestion, and during the pandemic the 2020–21 semi-finals were played as single-leg ties. At the same time, the winners continued to receive a UEFA berth—latterly a place in the UEFA Europa Conference League play-off round—while France suspended its own League Cup after 2019–20 to ease the calendar.

Audience and attendances have reflected this shift. The 2023 final drew a record 4.26 million UK viewers on Sky Sports; in 2025 the final peaked at nearly eight million viewers across Sky and ITV, with a crowd of 88,513 at Wembley. The competition has also remained a route to early-season silverware for leading clubs—Manchester City, for example, won four consecutive titles between 2018 and 2021.

Broadcast distribution has expanded in parallel, with new multi-year international deals in markets such as the United States and a broadened list of global partners.

=== Giant-killings ===
Giant-killings are less well remembered in the League Cup than in the FA Cup due to the absence of non-league sides and the fact that big clubs often field more inexperienced sides in the early rounds. However, there have been some notable upsets; the final of 1966–67 saw Division Three side Queens Park Rangers come from 2–0 down at halftime to win 3–2 against top-flight West Bromwich Albion in the first League Cup Final to be hosted at Wembley Stadium. Two years later in 1968–69, Third Division side Swindon Town beat Arsenal 3–1 after extra time in the final to win the trophy. In 1974–75, Fourth Division side Chester beat defending league champions Leeds United 3–0 on their surprise run to the semi-finals.

Former League club and now defunct Scarborough defeated Chelsea 4–3 on aggregate in October 1989, while a Fourth Division club. In 1992–93, Scarborough then defeated Coventry City (then a top-tier side) 3–2 on aggregate, before ultimately going out of the competition, narrowly, 1–0, against Arsenal.

In 1995–96, Manchester United were beaten 3–0 at home by York City in the second round, first leg; United could only win 3–1 in the second leg and went out 4–3 on aggregate (York went on to repeat the achievement against Everton the following year). United went on to win the FA Premier League and FA Cup double and did not lose another home game that season, while York narrowly avoided relegation to Division Three (fourth tier).

Grimsby Town recorded a number of upsets over a nine-year stretch; whilst playing in the third tier in 1997–98 they defeated Premier League side Sheffield Wednesday 4–3 on aggregate over both legs before knocking out fellow Premier League side (and League Cup holders) Leicester City 3–1. In 2001–02, they beat current holders Liverpool at Anfield with a 2–1 win in extra time. Four years later, they recorded another giant killing by defeating Tottenham Hotspur 1–0 at home; by this time Grimsby were playing in the fourth tier. In the 2025–26 season, Grimsby were also playing in the fourth tier (League Two) when they defeated Manchester United 12–11 in a penalty shootout, after a 2–2 draw at home.

Manchester United have also been knocked out by Southend United and Coventry City in 2006–07 and 2007–08 respectively: in the match against Southend they fielded a strong side with 10 internationals, bucking a trend they had themselves started during the 1990s. In the 2014–15 season, Manchester United fielded five international players but lost 4–0 in the second round (in which they entered the tournament) against third-tier side MK Dons.

In 2010, Liverpool were humbled again by Northampton Town, one of the lowest placed teams in League Two. In the 2012–13 competition, League Two (fourth tier) side Bradford City eliminated three Premier League sides from the competition, becoming the lowest-ranked team to do so since Rochdale in 1961–62. However, their luck finally ran out in the final, where they were beaten by Swansea City. In their centenary year, Swansea became the first team from outside England to win the League Cup on 24 February 2013, when they beat Bradford City 5–0 to win their first major English trophy.

In the 2022–23 competition, Gillingham (then ranked 22nd in League Two) eliminated Brentford (then ranked 11th in the Premier League) in the third round on penalties; the teams were 79 places apart in the English football league system.

On 27 October 2026, League Two side Fleetwood Town achieved a historic giant-killing by eliminating Premier League champions Arsenal in the fourth round of the 2026–27 EFL Cup. Playing at Highbury Stadium, Fleetwood took the lead in the 21st minute through Aaron Loupalo-Bi. Arsenal equalised early in the second half via Viktor Gyökeres, but the visitors were reduced to ten men when Max Dowman received a straight red card in the 86th minute. With the match ending 1–1 after regulation time, the tie proceeded to a penalty shoot-out. Fleetwood converted all five of their penalties, with Conor Haughey scoring the decisive spot-kick after Arsenal midfielder Bruno Guimarães missed his attempt. The 5–3 shoot-out victory sent Fleetwood to the competition's quarter-finals for the first time in the club's history, having already defeated Championship side Sheffield United in the previous round.

== Format ==
The League Cup is open to all 92 members of the Premier League and English Football League and is divided into seven rounds, organised so that 32 teams remain by the third round (with the exception of the 1961–62 competition). The fixtures in every round except the final are determined by a random draw. Up to 1995–96, all teams were involved from the second round, although some received byes to that stage. Since 1996–97, teams involved in European competition during the season have received a bye to the third round; the remaining Premier League teams enter at the second round. While most Football League teams enter in the first round, adjustments are made to ensure 32 teams are in the third round. In the most common occurrence, where seven Premier League clubs are in European football, two teams from the EFL Championship receive byes to the second round. In other circumstances, a preliminary round may be used among teams promoted from the previous season's National League and, if required, the lowest-placed finisher(s) from the previous season's EFL League Two. Preliminary rounds have been necessary only in 2002–03, 2011–12, 2025–26, and 2026–27.

Matches in all rounds are single-legged, except for the semi-finals, which have been two-legged since the competition began. The final was two-legged from 1961 to 1966, but has been single-legged ever since. The first round was two-legged from 1975–76 to 2000–01, and the second round was two-legged from 1979–80 to 2000–01. Single-legged matches would be replayed as necessary until 1993–94, when penalties were introduced to settle the first replay; the last single-legged tie to require a replay was played in 1996–97.

Until 1974–75, two-legged ties that remained level after extra time in the second leg would be replayed; in that time, three ties reached a third replay. Between 1975–76 and 1979–80, ties would still be replayed, but a penalty shoot-out would be used to settle ties that could not be decided after a replay; replays of two-legged matches were finally abolished for 1980–81, with the away goals rule and penalties being adopted instead. The semi-finals were the exception to this, with level ties being replayed until 1986–87, after which the away goals rule and penalties were introduced. The semi-finals, when played over two legs, would apply the away goals rule only after extra time. From 2018–19, extra time was scrapped for all rounds except the final, and the away goal rule was scrapped for the semi-final, with level ties going straight to a penalty shoot-out. Since 2024–25, the Video Assistant Referee (VAR) system is used in all EFL Cup ties held at Premier League stadiums.

=== Final ===
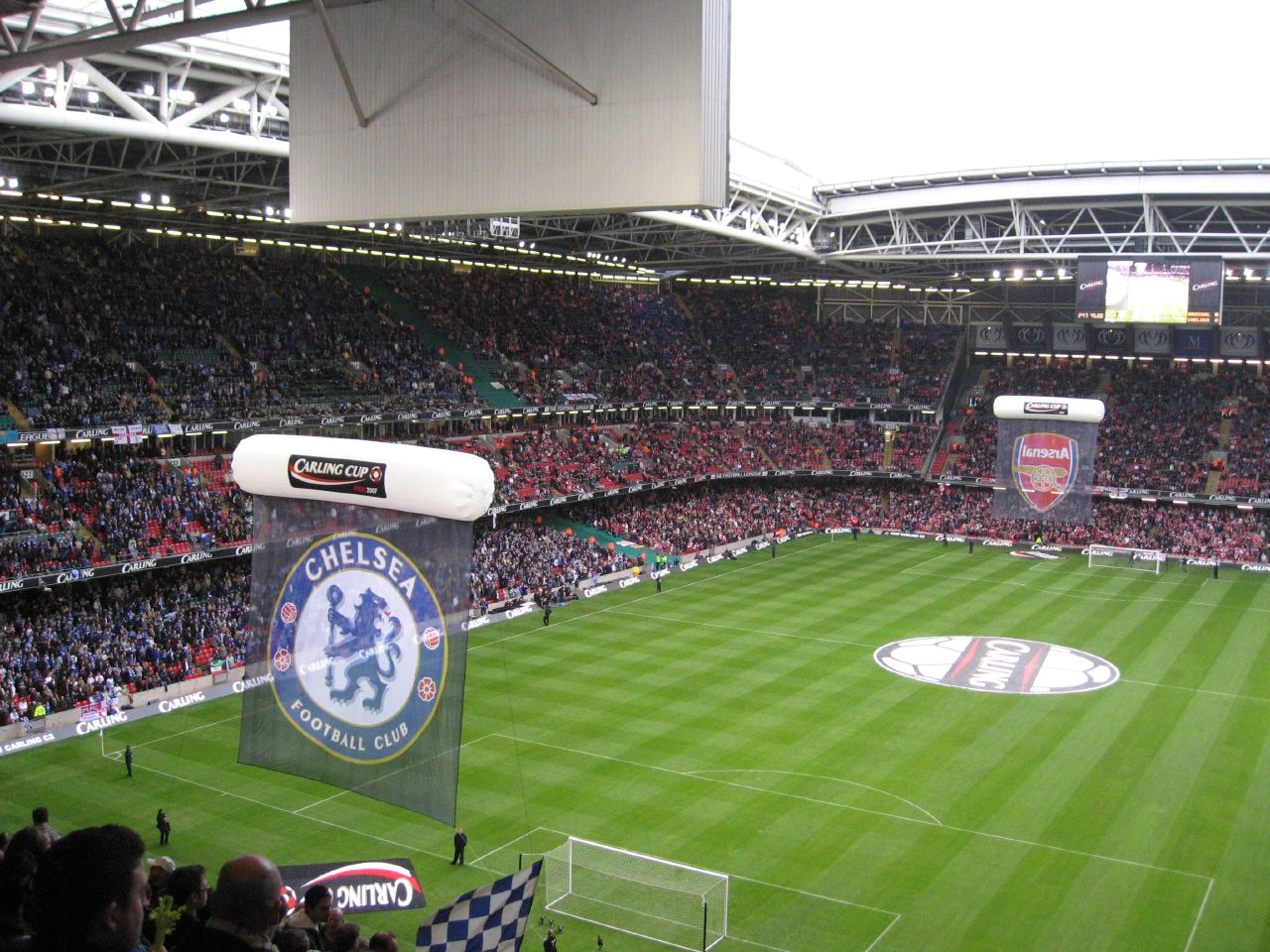
Pre-match presentation at the 2007 final between Chelsea and Arsenal at the Millennium Stadium in Cardiff

For the first six seasons of the Football League Cup, the final was played over two legs, one at the home ground of each finalist. Since 1967, the final has been played as a single match at Wembley Stadium, although the Millennium Stadium in Cardiff was used between 2001 and 2007, following the demolition of the old Wembley. Between 1967 and 1997, finals that finished level after extra time were replayed at an alternative venue until a winner was decided. The venues that hosted replays were Hillsborough Stadium in Sheffield, Old Trafford and Maine Road in Manchester and Villa Park in Birmingham. The only final to require two replays was the 1977 final between Aston Villa and Everton.

Since 1998, finals that have finished level after extra time have been decided by penalty shoot-out. Until 1999–2000, the final was played in late March or early April. Thereafter it has been played in late February or early March.

Since 1989–90, the best player in the League Cup final has been presented with the Alan Hardaker Trophy, named after Alan Hardaker, the former secretary of the Football League who devised the Football League Cup. John Terry, Ben Foster, Vincent Kompany and Virgil van Dijk are the only players to win the award more than once.

== Results by club ==
EFL Cup finalists by club
Team	Winners	Years won	Runners-up	Years runners-up	Final appearances
Liverpool	10	1980–81, 1981–82, 1982–83, 1983–84, 1994–95, 2000–01, 2002–03, 2011–12, 2021–22, 2023–24	5	1977–78, 1986–87, 2004–05, 2015–16, 2024–25	15
Manchester City	9	1969–70, 1975–76, 2013–14, 2015–16, 2017–18, 2018–19, 2019–20, 2020–21, 2025–26	1	1973–74	10
Manchester United	6	1991–92, 2005–06, 2008–09, 2009–10, 2016–17, 2022–23	4	1982–83, 1990–91, 1993–94, 2002–03	10
Chelsea	5	1964–65, 1997–98, 2004–05, 2006–07, 2014–15	5	1971–72, 2007–08, 2018–19, 2021–22, 2023–24	10
Aston Villa	5	1960–61, 1974–75, 1976–77, 1993–94, 1995–96	4	1962–63, 1970–71, 2009–10, 2019–20	9
Tottenham Hotspur	4	1970–71, 1972–73, 1998–99, 2007–08	5	1981–82, 2001–02, 2008–09, 2014–15, 2020–21	9
Nottingham Forest	4	1977–78, 1978–79, 1988–89, 1989–90	2	1979–80, 1991–92	6
Leicester City	3	1963–64, 1996–97, 1999–2000	2	1964–65, 1998–99	5
Arsenal	2	1986–87, 1992–93	7	1967–68, 1968–69, 1987–88, 2006–07, 2010–11, 2017–18, 2025–26	9
Norwich City	2	1961–62, 1984–85	2	1972–73, 1974–75	4
Birmingham City	2	1962–63, 2010–11	1	2000–01	3
Wolverhampton Wanderers	2	1973–74, 1979–80	0	—	2
West Bromwich Albion	1	1965–66	2	1966–67, 1969–70	3
Middlesbrough	1	2003–04	2	1996–97, 1997–98	3
Newcastle United	1	2024–25	2	1975–76, 2022–23	3
Queens Park Rangers	1	1966–67	1	1985–86	2
Leeds United	1	1967–68	1	1995–96	2
Stoke City	1	1971–72	1	1963–64	2
Luton Town	1	1987–88	1	1988–89	2
Sheffield Wednesday	1	1990–91	1	1992–93	2
Swindon Town	1	1968–69	0	—	1
Oxford United	1	1985–86	0	—	1
Blackburn Rovers	1	2001–02	0	—	1
Swansea City	1	2012–13	0	—	1
West Ham United	0	—	2	1965–66, 1980–81	2
Everton	0	—	2	1976–77, 1983–84	2
Southampton	0	—	2	1978–79, 2016–17	2
Sunderland	0	—	2	1984–85, 2013–14	2
Bolton Wanderers	0	—	2	1994–95, 2003–04	2
Rotherham United	0	—	1	1960–61	1
Rochdale	0	—	1	1961–62	1
Oldham Athletic	0	—	1	1989–90	1
Tranmere Rovers	0	—	1	1999–2000	1
Wigan Athletic	0	—	1	2005–06	1
Cardiff City	0	—	1	2011–12	1
Bradford City	0	—	1	2012–13	1

== Sponsorship ==
From 1981 to the present (except in 2016–17), the League Cup has attracted title sponsorship, which meant, unlike its older sibling the FA Cup, the League Cup was named after its sponsor, giving it the following names:

Period	Sponsor	Name	Trophy
1960–1981	—N/a	Football League Cup	Original trophy
1981–1986	Milk Marketing Board	Milk Cup	Milk Cup trophy
1986–1990	Littlewoods	Littlewoods Challenge Cup	Littlewoods Challenge Cup trophy
1990–1992	Rumbelows	Rumbelows Cup	Original trophy
1992–1998	Coca-Cola	Coca-Cola Cup	Original trophy
1998–2003	Worthington's	Worthington Cup	Original trophy
2003–2012	Carling	Carling Cup	Original trophy
2012–2016	Capital One	Capital One Cup	Original trophy
2016–2017	—N/a	EFL Cup	Original trophy
2017–2029	Carabao Energy Drink	Carabao Cup	Original trophy

== Trophy ==
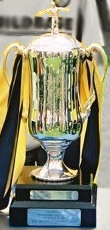
The Milk Cup, awarded in 1982 to 1986.

The winners receive the Football League Cup, of which there have been three designs – the current one also being the original, a three-handled Georgian-style urn with a separate plinth (added later). Designed and manufactured by Mappin & Webb, it weighs 2.976 kg (95.7 ozt) and measures 27 cm × 20.5 cm (11 in × 8 in) It is worth around £20,000. It was used until the 1980–81 competition, before coming back into use ever since the 1990–91 competition. The reason for the break in usage was the introduction of the first competition sponsor – the Milk Marketing Board, which chose to award its own trophy from 1981–82 to 1985–86. The next sponsor, Littlewoods, also chose to award their own trophy, from 1986–87 until 1989–90. Later sponsors have used the original.

== Broadcasters ==
In the United Kingdom and Republic of Ireland, the tournament is broadcast live by Sky Sports. Until 2024, Sky had a selection of 15 matches per season, with highlights from several matches on ITV Sport beginning in 2022/23. This competition is included in the EFL broadcast package.

In 2024/25, all matches were broadcast live by Sky Sports for the first time, with ITV Sport producing its own coverage of one leg from each of the semi-finals (one first leg and the other second leg) for airing on ITV1 and STV, and simulcasting Sky's coverage of the final live.

From the 2025/26 season onwards, under the five-year domestic rights deal with Sky Sports (running through 2028/29), all Carabao Cup matches are broadcast live, with over 1,000 EFL matches per season (including every Carabao Cup tie) available across Sky Sports channels or the Sky Sports+ streaming service (integrated at no extra cost for Sky Sports subscribers and accessible via NOW TV). Matches are typically shown on Sky Sports Football or other main channels when selected, while others stream exclusively on Sky Sports+, ensuring comprehensive coverage of all 93 ties per season. In addition, ITV Sport added a game from each round prior to the semi-finals. This builds on the existing free-to-air agreement with ITV (covering select semi-final legs and the final, continuing through 2026/27) with ITV Sport continuing to produce its own coverage of games chosen for airing on ITV1 and STV (except the final)

=== International broadcasters ===
Source: England Football League website as of September 1, 2026.

==== Americas ====
Country	Broadcaster
Brazil	ESPN
Canada	DAZN
Caribbean	ESPN
Latin America	ESPN
Puerto Rico; United States	Paramount+

==== Asia ====
Country	Broadcaster
Afghanistan	Ariana TV
Bangladesh	Bongo
Bhutan	FanCode
Central Asia	Setanta Sports
China	Douyin
Hong Kong	TVB
India	FanCode
Indonesia	Emtek
Japan	DAZN
Laos	Unitel
Malaysia	Astro Sports
Maldives	FanCode
Myanmar	Sky Net
Nepal	DGO
Pakistan	Myco
Singapore	Singtel
South Korea	Coupang Play
Sri Lanka	FanCode
Thailand	Monomax
Vietnam	SCTV

==== Europe ====
Country	Broadcaster
Albania	SuperSport
Armenia	Fast Sports
Austria	Sky Sport
Azerbaijan	Setanta Sports
Belgium	RTL
Bosnia and Herzegovina	Arena Sport
Bulgaria	Nova Sport
Croatia	Arena Sport
Cyprus	Cytavision Sports
Czech Republic	Nova Sport
Denmark	Viaplay
Estonia	Setanta Sports
Finland	Viaplay
France	beIN Sports
Georgia	Setanta Sports
Germany	Sky Sport
Greece	Action 24
Hungary	Network4
Iceland	Viaplay
Italy	Como TV
Kosovo	SuperSport, Arena Sport
Latvia	Setanta Sports
Liechtenstein	Sky Sport
Lithuania	Setanta Sports
Luxembourg	Sky Sport
Malta	Total Sports Network
Moldova	Setanta Sports
Montenegro	Arena Sport
Netherlands	Viaplay
North Macedonia	Arena Sport
Norway	Viaplay
Poland	TVP
Portugal	Sport TV
Romania	Digi Sport
Russia	Futbol TV
San Marino	Como TV
Serbia	Arena Sport
Slovakia	Nova Sport
Slovenia	Arena Sport
Sweden	Viaplay
Switzerland	Sky Sport
Turkey	S Sport
Ukraine	Setanta Sports

==== Middle East and North Africa ====
Country	Broadcaster
Israel	Charlton
MENA	beIN Sports

==== Oceania ====
Country	Broadcaster
Australia	beIN Sports
New Zealand	beIN Sports

==== Sub-Saharan Africa ====
Country	Broadcaster
Sub-Saharan Africa	SuperSport; StarTimes
Kenya; Malawi; Rwanda; Tanzania; Uganda; Zambia; Zimbabwe	Azam Sports

== Records ==
As of 2026:

- Most tournament wins (team): 10 – Liverpool
- Most consecutive tournament wins (team): 4 – Liverpool (1981–1984) and Manchester City (2018–2021)
- Most final appearances (team): 15 – Liverpool
- Most tournament appearances (individual) 102 – Peter Shilton
- Most tournament wins (manager): 5
  - Pep Guardiola
- Most tournament wins (individual): 6
  - Sergio Agüero and Fernandinho for Manchester City (2014, 2016, 2018–2021)
- Most final appearances (individual): 6
  - Ian Rush for Liverpool (1981–1984, 1987, 1995)
  - Emile Heskey for Leicester City (1997, 1999, 2000), Liverpool (2001, 2003) and Aston Villa (2010)
  - Fernandinho for Manchester City (2014, 2016, 2018–2021)
- Most finals scored in: (individual): 3 – Didier Drogba
- Most goals scored (individual, career): 49 – Ian Rush
- Most goals scored (individual, season): 12 – Clive Allen, Tottenham Hotspur (1986–87)
- Most goals scored (individual, match): 6 – Frankie Bunn (Oldham Athletic, vs Scarborough, 25 October 1989)
- Biggest win:
  - West Ham United 10–0 Bury, second round, second leg, 25 October 1983
  - Liverpool 10–0 Fulham, second round first leg, 23 September 1986
- Biggest aggregate win in a semi-final: Manchester City 10–0 Burton Albion (9–0 home, 1–0 away), 23 January 2019
- Biggest win in a final: Swansea City 5–0 Bradford City, 24 February 2013
- Highest scoring game: 12 goals
  - Reading 5–7 (a.e.t.) Arsenal, fourth round, 30 October 2012
  - Dagenham & Redbridge 6–6 (a.e.t.) Brentford, first round, 12 August 2014
- Most penalties scored in a penalty shoot-out: 31
  - Preston North End 16-15 Fulham (17 September 2024)
- Most penalties attempted in a penalty shoot-out: 34 – Preston North End 16-15 Fulham (17 September 2024)
- Youngest player: Noah Anyadike (15 years 98 days) – Cardiff vs Norwich (25 August 2026)
- Youngest goalscorer in the final: Norman Whiteside (17 years, 323 days) – Manchester United vs Liverpool, 1983
- Youngest captain in the final: Barry Venison (20 years, 220 days) – Sunderland vs Norwich City, 1985
- Most replays in a tie: 3
  - Tranmere Rovers v. Chester (1968–69, first round): 0–0, 2–2 aet, 1–1 aet, 2–1
  - Reading v. Brighton & Hove Albion (1974–75, first round): 0–0, 2–2 aet, 0–0 aet, 3–2
  - Hartlepool v. Bournemouth (1974–75, second round): 1–1, 2–2 aet, 1–1 aet, 1–0
  - Birmingham City v. Notts County (1983–84, third round): 2–2, 0–0 aet, 0–0 aet, 3–1
  - Swindon Town v. Bolton Wanderers (1989–90, third round): 3–3, 1–1 aet, 1–1 aet, 2–1 aet
- Lowest league tier of a League Cup winner: tier 3
  - Queens Park Rangers (1966–67; Football League Third Division – overall rank 45th)
  - Swindon Town (1968–69; Football League Third Division – overall rank 46th)
- Lowest league tier of a League Cup runner-up: tier 4
  - Rochdale F.C. (1961–62; Football League Fourth Division – overall rank 80th)
  - Bradford City (2012–13; Football League Two – overall rank 75th)
