= 1983–84 Wolverhampton Wanderers F.C. season =

English football club season

Wolverhampton Wanderers
1983–84 season
- Chairman: Derek Dougan
- Manager: Graham Hawkins (until April 1984); Jim Barron (caretaker)
- Stadium: Molineux
- Football League First Division: 22nd (relegated)
- Milk Cup: Second round
- FA Cup: Third round
- Top goalscorer: League: Wayne Clarke (6); All: Wayne Clarke (9)
- Highest home attendance: 26,249 v Liverpool (Division One, 27 August 1983)
- Lowest home attendance: 6,611 v Ipswich Town (Division One, 21 April 1984)
- Average home league attendance: 12,478
- Biggest win: 3–0 v Everton (H), Division One, 27 December 1983
- Biggest defeat: 0–5 v Nottingham Forest (A), Division One, 5 November 1983; 0–5 v Watford (H), Division One, 3 December 1983

The 1983–84 season was the 85th of competitive league football in the history of Wolverhampton Wanderers. Following promotion to the First Division the previous season, they suffered an immediate relegation back to the Second Division, finishing bottom of the table with only six wins all season.

== Squad ==
Substitute appearances indicated in brackets

Pos.	Nat.	Name	League		Milk Cup		FA Cup		Total	
Pos.	Nat.	Name	Apps	Goals	Apps	Goals	Apps	Goals	Apps	Goals
GK	ENG	Paul Bradshaw	10	0	2	0	0	0	12	0
GK	ENG	John Burridge	32	0	0	0	3	0	35	0
DF	ENG	Mike Bennett	6	0	2	0	0	0	8	0
DF	ENG	Mark Buckland	13(2)	0	2	0	0	0	13(2)	0
DF	ENG	Bobby Coy	5	0	2	0	0	0	7	0
DF	ENG	Alan Dodd	41	0	2	0	3	0	46	0
DF	ENG	John Humphrey	28	0	2	0	3	0	33	0
DF	ENG	Geoff Palmer	27(3)	1	1	0	3	0	31(3)	1
DF	IRE	John Pender	34	1	0	0	3	0	37	1
DF	SCO	Graham Rodger	1	0	0	0	0	0	1	0
DF	SCO	Gordon Smith	11	1	1	0	0	0	12	1
DF	ENG	Stuart Watkiss	2	0	0	0	0	0	2	0
MF	IRE	Martin Bayly	7	0	0	0	0	0	7	0
MF	SCO	Andy Blair (on loan from Aston Villa)	10	0	0	0	0	0	10	0
MF	ENG	Paul Butler	0(3)	0	0(1)	0	0	0	0(4)	0
MF	ENG	Ian Cartwright	16	0	0	0	0	0	16	0
MF	SCO	Danny Crainie	27(1)	3	0	0	3	0	30(1)	3
MF	ENG	Peter Daniel	19	0	1	0	3	0	23	0
MF	ENG	Paul Dougherty	5	0	0	0	0	0	5	0
MF	ENG	Kenny Hibbitt	19(4)	0	2	0	0	0	21(4)	0
MF	SCO	Billy Kellock	3	0	0	0	0	0	3	0
MF	ENG	Steve Mardenborough	9	1	0(1)	0	0(1)	0	9(2)	1
MF	ENG	Mick Matthews	2	0	1	0	0	0	3	0
MF	ENG	Dale Rudge	15(4)	0	1	0	0	0	16(4)	0
MF	ENG	Tony Towner	25(6)	2	1	0	3	0	29(6)	0
MF	ENG	Dave Wintersgill	1(1)	0	0	0	0	0	1(1)	0
FW	ENG	Wayne Clarke	29(2)	6	2	2	3	1	34(2)	9
FW	ENG	Mel Eves	14(1)	3	1	0	3	1	18(1)	4
FW	SCO	Andy Gray	9	2	1	0	0	0	10	2
FW	ENG	Joe Jackson	1	0	0	0	0	0	1	0
FW	ENG	Billy Livingstone	11(2)	1	0	0	0	0	11(2)	1
FW	SCO	Scott McGarvey (on loan from Manchester United)	13	2	0	0	0	0	13	2
FW	NIR	Sammy Troughton	17	2	0	0	3	0	20	2

== First Division ==
Pos	Team	Pld	W	D	L	GF	GA	GD	Pts	Qualification or relegation
18	Stoke City	42	13	11	18	44	63	−19	50	
19	Coventry City	42	13	11	18	57	77	−20	50	
20	Birmingham City (R)	42	12	12	18	39	50	−11	48	Relegation to the Second Division
21	Notts County (R)	42	10	11	21	50	72	−22	41	Relegation to the Second Division
22	Wolverhampton Wanderers (R)	42	6	11	25	27	80	−53	29	Relegation to the Second Division

Source: World Football
Rules for classification: 1) Points; 2) Goal difference; 3) Goals scored
(R) Relegated

== Results ==
=== First Division ===
27 August 1983 1	Wolverhampton Wanderers	1–1	Liverpool	Wolverhampton
	Palmer 2' (pen.)		Rush 46'	Stadium: Molineux; Attendance: 26,249

29 August 1983 2	Wolverhampton Wanderers	1–2	Arsenal	Wolverhampton
	Clarke 3'		Nicholas 25', 81' (pen.)	Stadium: Molineux; Attendance: 18,571

3 September 1983 3	Norwich City	3–0	Wolverhampton Wanderers	Norwich
	Bertschin 4'; Deehan 10', 89'			Stadium: Carrow Road; Attendance: 13,713

7 September 1983 4	Sunderland	3–2	Wolverhampton Wanderers	Sunderland
	Rowell 18' (pen.); Daniel 57' (o.g.); Atkinson 75'		Towner 81'; Eves 87'	Stadium: Roker Park; Attendance: 12,961

10 September 1983 5	Wolverhampton Wanderers	1–1	Birmingham City	Wolverhampton
	Eves 9'		Wright 29' (pen.)	Stadium: Molineux; Attendance: 15,933

17 September 1983 6	Luton Town	4–0	Wolverhampton Wanderers	Luton
	Walsh 24'; Stein 51'; Moss 64'; Horton 78'			Stadium: Kenilworth Road; Attendance: 10,978

24 September 1983 7	Wolverhampton Wanderers	0–4	Queens Park Rangers	Wolverhampton
			Gregory 9'; Allen 10', 69'; Stainrod 39'	Stadium: Molineux; Attendance: 11,511

1 October 1983 8	Southampton	1–0	Wolverhampton Wanderers	Southampton
	Worthington 83'			Stadium: The Dell; Attendance: 16,589

15 October 1983 9	Wolverhampton Wanderers	2–3	Tottenham Hotspur	Wolverhampton
	Gray 16', 83'		Archibald 13', 38'; Falco 53'	Stadium: Molineux; Attendance: 12,523

23 October 1983 10	Wolverhampton Wanderers	1–1	Aston Villa	Wolverhampton
	Clarke 52'		Withe 32'	Stadium: Molineux; Attendance: 13,202

29 October 1983 11	Manchester United	3–0	Wolverhampton Wanderers	Stretford
	Stapleton 5', 44'; Robson 30'			Stadium: Old Trafford; Attendance: 41,880

5 November 1983 12	Nottingham Forest	5–0	Wolverhampton Wanderers	West Bridgford
	Birtles 5'; Davenport 15' (pen.); Walsh 55'; Hodge 59', 62'			Stadium: City Ground; Attendance: 13,855

12 November 1983 13	Wolverhampton Wanderers	0–3	West Ham United	Wolverhampton
			Brooking 5'; Swindlehurst 58'; Cottee 90'	Stadium: Molineux; Attendance: 12,062

19 November 1983 14	Wolverhampton Wanderers	0–0	Coventry City	Wolverhampton
				Stadium: Molineux; Attendance: 11,419

26 November 1983 15	West Bromwich Albion	1–3	Wolverhampton Wanderers	West Bromwich
	Thompson 88'		Crainie 51', 54'; Clarke 72'	Stadium: The Hawthorns; Attendance: 17,947

3 December 1983 16	Wolverhampton Wanderers	0–5	Watford	Wolverhampton
			Johnston 13', 19', 21'; Reilly 58', 64'	Stadium: Molineux; Attendance: 11,905

10 December 1983 17	Leicester City	5–1	Wolverhampton Wanderers	Leicester
	Lineker 22'; A. Smith 25', 35', 43'; Lynex 81'		Clarke 33'	Stadium: Filbert Street; Attendance: 10,965

17 December 1983 18	Wolverhampton Wanderers	0–0	Stoke City	Wolverhampton
				Stadium: Molineux; Attendance: 8,677

26 December 1983 19	Ipswich Town	3–1	Wolverhampton Wanderers	Ipswich
	Mariner 10'; O'Callaghan 49'; McCall 64'		Clarke 62' (pen.)	Stadium: Portman Road; Attendance: 14,477

27 December 1983 20	Wolverhampton Wanderers	3–0	Everton	Wolverhampton
	Eves 20'; Clarke 73'; Crainie 83'			Stadium: Molineux; Attendance: 12,761

31 December 1983 21	Wolverhampton Wanderers	2–0	Norwich City	Wolverhampton
	Troughton 52'; Towner 75'			Stadium: Molineux; Attendance: 10,725

2 January 1984 22	Queens Park Rangers	2–1	Wolverhampton Wanderers	London
	Wicks 69'; Gregory 71'		Dawes 84' (o.g.)	Stadium: Loftus Road; Attendance: 12,875

14 January 1984 23	Liverpool	0–1	Wolverhampton Wanderers	Liverpool
			Mardenborough 10'	Stadium: Anfield; Attendance: 23,325

21 January 1984 24	Wolverhampton Wanderers	1–2	Luton Town	Wolverhampton
	Pender 35'		Parker 2'; Walsh 87'	Stadium: Molineux; Attendance: 11,594

4 February 1984 25	Wolverhampton Wanderers	0–1	Southampton	Wolverhampton
			Moran 63'	Stadium: Molineux; Attendance: 9,943

11 February 1984 26	Birmingham City	0–0	Wolverhampton Wanderers	Birmingham
				Stadium: St Andrew's; Attendance: 14,319

18 February 1984 27	Wolverhampton Wanderers	1–1	Manchester United	Wolverhampton
	Troughton 14'		Whiteside 80'	Stadium: Molineux; Attendance: 20,676

25 February 1984 28	Aston Villa	4–0	Wolverhampton Wanderers	Birmingham
	Withe 22', 60'; Birch 61'; Walters 89'			Stadium: Villa Park; Attendance: 18,257

3 March 1984 29	Wolverhampton Wanderers	1–0	Nottingham Forest	Wolverhampton
	Hart 89' (o.g.)			Stadium: Molineux; Attendance: 10,476

10 March 1984 30	West Ham United	1–1	Wolverhampton Wanderers	London
	Cottee 29'		McGarvey 22'	Stadium: Upton Park; Attendance: 18,111

17 March 1984 31	Wolverhampton Wanderers	0–0	Sunderland	Wolverhampton
				Stadium: Molineux; Attendance: 9,111

24 March 1984 32	Arsenal	4–1	Wolverhampton Wanderers	London
	Woodcock 26'; Rix 34'; Nicholas 60' (pen.); Robson 84'		McGarvey 71'	Stadium: Highbury; Attendance: 18,612

31 March 1984 33	Tottenham Hotspur	1–0	Wolverhampton Wanderers	London
	Hazard 34'			Stadium: White Hart Lane; Attendance: 19,296

7 April 1984 34	Wolverhampton Wanderers	0–1	Notts County	Wolverhampton
			Hunt 38'	Stadium: Molineux; Attendance: 7,481

14 April 1984 35	Coventry City	2–1	Wolverhampton Wanderers	Coventry
	Daly 6' (pen.); Ferguson 87'		Livingstone 41'	Stadium: Highfield Road; Attendance: 8,246

21 April 1984 36	Wolverhampton Wanderers	0–3	Ipswich Town	Wolverhampton
			d'Avray 29'; Osman 39'; Sunderland 89'	Stadium: Molineux; Attendance: 6,611

23 April 1984 37	Everton	2–0	Wolverhampton Wanderers	Liverpool
	Gray 40'; Steven 71'			Stadium: Goodison Park; Attendance: 17,185

28 April 1984 38	Wolverhampton Wanderers	0–0	West Bromwich Albion	Wolverhampton
				Stadium: Molineux; Attendance: 13,208

1 May 1984 39	Notts County	4–0	Wolverhampton Wanderers	Nottingham
	Chiedozie 6'; Christie 20', 88'; Hunt 54'			Stadium: Meadow Lane; Attendance: 5,378

5 May 1984 40	Watford	0–0	Wolverhampton Wanderers	Watford
				Stadium: Vicarage Road; Attendance: 13,534

7 May 1984 41	Wolverhampton Wanderers	1–0	Leicester City	Wolverhampton
	Smith 5'			Stadium: Molineux; Attendance: 7,405

12 May 1984 42	Stoke City	4–0	Wolverhampton Wanderers	Stoke-on-Trent
	Maguire 19', 42', 49' (pen.), 89' (pen.)			Stadium: Victoria Ground; Attendance: 18,977

=== Milk Cup ===
4 October 1983 2nd Round 1st Leg	Wolverhampton Wanderers	2–3	Preston North End	Wolverhampton
	Clarke 2', 43'		Hinnigan 24', 63'; Naughton 61'	Stadium: Molineux; Attendance: 7,790

25 October 1983 2nd Round 2nd Leg	Preston North End	1–0	Wolverhampton Wanderers	Preston
	Elliott 65'			Stadium: Deepdale; Attendance: 8,857

=== FA Cup ===
7 January 1984 3rd Round	Coventry City	1–1	Wolverhampton Wanderers	Coventry
	Withey 6'		Clarke 16'	Stadium: Highfield Road; Attendance: 15,817

10 January 1984 3rd Round Replay	Wolverhampton Wanderers	1–1 (a.e.t.)	Coventry City	Wolverhampton
	Eves 69'		Peake 85'	Stadium: Molineux; Attendance: 19,204

16 January 1984 3rd Round 2nd Replay	Coventry City	3–0	Wolverhampton Wanderers	Coventry
	Withey 24', 67'; Hunt 43'			Stadium: Highfield Road; Attendance: 18,003
