= 1984–85 Wolverhampton Wanderers F.C. season =

English football club season

Wolverhampton Wanderers
1984–85 season
- Chairman: Derek Dougan
- Manager: Tommy Docherty
- Second Division: 22nd
- FA Cup: 3rd Round
- League Cup: 3rd Round
- Top goalscorer: League: Ainscow, Buckland & Evans (5); All: Ainscow & Evans (6)
- Highest home attendance: 16,698 (vs Birmingham City, 22 September 1984)
- Lowest home attendance: 4,422 (vs Huddersfield Town, 6 May 1985)
- Average home league attendance: 8,353 (league only)

The 1984–85 season was the 86th season of competitive league football in the history of English football club Wolverhampton Wanderers. They played in the second tier of the English football system, the Football League Second Division.

This season would start with the club under the ownership of the Bhatti Brothers "Allied Properties" and with 1970s club legend Derek Dougan in role of chairman. A change of manager during the off-season saw Tommy Docherty hired to lead the team, succeeding Graham Hawkins who had been dismissed at the end of the previous season following relegation the top tier.

The team would suffer a further relegation after finishing the 1984–85 season in 22nd place, during a difficult period for the club which was suffering financial difficulties.

== Background ==
=== Appointment of new manager ===
Scotsman Tommy Docherty, often affectionately referred to as "The Doc", had been appointed as Manager in June 1984 following the club's relegation from Division 1.

Docherty was a well-travelled player and manager, having taken charge of six different teams during the previous seven years before his appointment at Molineux. He had already spent time in the Midlands at Wolves' local rivals Aston Villa, where he had been sacked in 1970 with the club bottom of Division Two.

During his first managerial role in 1967–68, Docherty had famously vowed to take Rotherham United up out of Division 2, but instead performed the opposite, taking them down to Division 3. His next management role was at Aston Villa before moving overseas to manage Porto. He also spent time as an international manager with his native Scotland (guiding them towards the 1974 World Cup) but he quit this role before qualification was secured to take over as manager at Manchester United.

At Manchester United, Docherty experienced relegation from and promotion to Division 1, as well as defeating rivals Liverpool to win the 1977 FA Cup, only to be sacked days later due to having an affair with the club physiotherapist's wife.

Doherty's nomadic path saw him manage several British-based clubs following this for short periods, as well as working in Australia at Sydney Olympic on two occasions. The latter would be his last role prior to his appointment at Wolves.

=== Financial constraints ===
Docherty's task at Wolves was not to be an easy one. Wolves had been spending heavily during the late 1970s, notably when Andy Gray was signed in 1979 from Aston Villa for just under £1.5 million, setting a new British transfer fee record. Gray would later score the winning goal for Wolves in the 1980 League Cup final.

By the late 1970s, Wolves' Molineux Stadium had become dated: the Safety of Sports Grounds Act 1975 had introduced legal requirements to ensure a safe environment for staff and spectators. The Molineux Street Stand was deemed unfit under this legislation. If Wolves intended to use the stand, it needed to be rebuilt, but the club's Chairman Harry Marshall had bigger plans than this. Instead, Marshall began planning for a whole new stadium, at an estimated cost of £10 million. It would be the first brand new permanent football stadium in the UK to be constructed since the Second World War, and the forward thinking design was rumoured to include the possibility of installing an enclosed roof by 1984. In 1978, Marshall stated that "It is a bold move on our part and the design is revolutionary but we want to start something future generations will be proud of as we move into our second 100 years".

The construction began with the demolition of 71 terraced houses the club had purchased to create space for the new "John Ireland Stand"; despite its completion, work on the other stands had not begun. The project so far cost more than £2,000,000; and by 2 July 1982, the writing was on the wall with the local newspaper leading with the front-page headline "Wolves have gone bust". With the building of the new infrastructure, Wolves had accumulated debts of £2,600,000 by 1982 and new investors were needed to save the club. Three suitors put their names forward to acquire of the club. Local businessman Sir Jack Hayward was interested in putting forwards a proposal, as was Doug Ellis, chairman of local rivals Aston Villa; however, at the last minute a consortium led by Saudi Arabian brothers Mahmud and Mohammad Bhatti was selected.

Fronting the bid on behalf of the Bhatti Brothers' "Allied Properties" banner was 1970s Wolves legend Derek Dougan, who had played for the club in the 1972 UEFA Cup final. Dougan would be placed in charge of the football side of operations in the role of chairman with the aim of adding credibility to the brothers' proposal. The Bhatti Brothers' project had pinned its hopes on the redevelopment of the Molineux site and immediate surrounding area, but with more interest in the land than on the pitch, their tenure would show a genuine lack of interest and involvement in the football from the brothers and sentiment towards the club soured when they failed to secure a deal and planning permissions with the local council for an area immediately behind the Molineux stadium which they had planned to develop. With little funds and a lack of enthusiasm for the club's operations, the rest of the stadium fell further into disrepair and attendances dwindled.

== Build-up to the season ==
By the time Docherty arrived to take over for the 1984–85 season, players such as record signing Andy Gray had long left the club, and during the summer of 1984, following relegation from the top flight, more players were to also leave. This included prominent attackers Mel Eves and Wayne Clarke. 27-year-old Eves had made 214 Wolves starts and scored 53 goals for the club, but left Wolves to train with Mancherster City following a ruptured achilles tendon injury he picked up in his final Wolves match in 1984, eventually joining Sheffield United for an undisclosed fee. Clarke, who had started 148 games and scored 30 goals for Wolves, also left the club for an initial £80,000, transferring to local rivals Birmingham City. Eves later stated that his decision to leave was based upon the treatment he received after his injury and being offered a contract with reduced salary by Docherty, while Clarke cited the nature of his monthly rolling contract and lack of investment in the squad.

Winger Tony Towner also departed that summer having been signed from Rotherham United only 12 months earlier for £10,000 and had become a first team regular at Molineux. Towner famously had been on then-manager Graham Hawkins' pre-season shopping list that was presented to Dougan, but Hawkins was furious to find that Dougan had spent so much of the budget on him whilst he and head coach Jim Barron were out of the country. Towner would move on to Charlton Athletic for just £15,000. Perhaps most significant was the loss of Wolves legend Kenny Hibbitt. The midfielder, the club's second highest appearances holder (574) and tenth top scorer (114), opted for a move to Coventry City for an undisclosed fee. Asked for his thoughts on leaving the club, Hibbitt said "Tommy Docherty came in as manager and he knew I didn't want to be around to see the club in such dire straits".

As the start of the season approached, there was yet more selection issues for Docherty. John Burridge, who been first choice goalkeeper for the last two seasons, was out of contract and making demands of the club. With the season beginning with a home game against Sheffield United, Docherty was to make a bold decision. Rather than meet Burridge's demands, the club would bring in 17-year-old academy keeper Tim Flowers for his league debut.

== The season ==
Wolves' season would start at Molineux with the club hosting newly-promoted Sheffield United, who had finished 3rd in Division 3 the year before. Academy players Tim Flowers and Derek Ryan would make their league debuts for the club alongside new signings Alan Ainscow, Tony Evans and Tommy Langley. They were joined in the starting eleven by an experienced defence of John Humphrey, Geoff Palmer and John Pender alongside experienced wingers/utility players Paul Butler, Ian Cartwright and Alan Dodd. The game finished 2-2, with Langley and Dodd scoring in front of almost 15,000 fans.

After five matches Wolves were placed 10th in the table, with home victories against Manchester City and Charlton Athletic, a further draw at Middlesbrough and a defeat at Leeds United. The players who started in opening day fixture had continued to feature across this early period of the season and would be joined by goalscorers Mark Buckland and Paul Dougherty (who had both been signed late in the previous season). Wolves also signed Jim Melrose on loan from Celtic. However, after the next four games Wolves had dropped to 15th place after a series of back-to-back league defeats, including a 5-1 defeat at Barnsley broadcast live on ITV, with Palmer and Flowers both giving away penalties in the match.

With the early progress looking respectable, Wolves approved the sale of goalkeeper John Burridge (who had been out on loan to Derby County since the start of the season) to Sheffield United, but signed defender David Barnes from Ipswich Town for £44,000 and New Zealand midfielder Ricki Herbert from Docherty's old club Sydney Olympic for free. Melrose had impressed on his loan from Celtic and Docherty wanted to make the signing permanent, but was unable to secure the £40,000 being asked and Melrose subsequently returned to Scotland.

Three wins in succession would see Wolves climb to 13th in the table before Wolves travelled to Grimsby Town for their second 5-1 defeat of the season, once again broadcast live on ITV. Hoping that the heavy defeats were behind them, by the end of November Wolves had picked up a further four points with a 3–3 draw at home to Wimbledon and a 2–1 victory over Fulham. As December approached, Wolves sat 14th in the table, with top scorers Tony Evans (5), Tommy Langley (4) and Mark Buckland (4) having a modest total of 13 goals between them.

Experienced defender Geoff Palmer, who had played 394 games for the club, moved to Burnley at the end of November. Palmer left believing he had fallen out of favour with Docherty, stating that "the club just wasn't a nice place to be at the time, it wasn't being run properly, and was on its knees". From December onwards, Wolves hit an awful period of form, failing to win any of the next 19 league games. This included a 4–1 defeat to Notts County who were relegated along with Wolves in 1983-84 and would go on to finish 21st in the league.

During January Wolves continued to lose experienced players, with Alan Dodd (who had played 99 times for the club, including 24 under Docherty, and scoring three goals) moving on to Stoke City, and Paul Butler (who had also been a prominent feature for Docherty with 22 appearances and 2 goals) was loaned to Hereford United who later made the move permanent. With pressure mounting, chairman Derek Dougan resigned from his position on the board.

Before the season ended, top scorers and first team wingers Tony Evans (5), Tommy Langley (4), Paul Dougherty (2) and Danny Crainie would also be sent out on temporary loan spells, to be replaced by two new signings (Ray Hankin and Andy King) and two incoming loanees (Peter Eastoe and Steve Biggins). The incoming quartet would score just one goal between them that season. More positive was the signing of defender Peter Zelem from Chester City and the promotion of young academy player Campbell Chapman, son of head coach Sammy Chapman.

On 4 May 1985, Wolves travelled to Brighton & Hove Albion and suffered their third 5-1 defeat of the season. During the game, goalkeeper Tim Flowers received a head injury whilst stopping a 27th-minute penalty at 2–0 down. Flowers was not allowed treatment for the injury and the referee had the spot kick retaken. The defeat confirmed that Wolves would be relegated to Division 3.

The following game was the penultimate of the season and would also be Docherty's final home match at Molineux. The match was a rare success: Wolves recorded their eighth win of the season with a 2–1 victory over Huddersfield Town, with goals from Alan Ainscow and Derek Ryan. Scott Barrett played in goal, replacing the injured Flowers. The match was played in front of a diminished crowd of 4,422, less than a third of the crowd that had witnessed Docherty's first game in charge just eight months earlier, with the decline seen as a reflection of the club's poor season.

The final day of the season was 11 May 1985–the day of the Bradford City stadium fire–saw Wolves lose 3–0 to promotion hopefuls Blackburn Rovers at Ewood Park (they would miss out on promotion by 1 point). Docherty's torrid season, which included a run of 21 games without a win, had finally come to an end. He left the club in July 1985. When asked about his time at Wolves Docherty said, "I could hardly say 'no' when a club as famous as that came in for me..... But it was a hopeless task really. There was no money. I wasn't sure I'd be able to work with Derek Dougan but I accepted the challenge anyway. As for the Bhattis, I only met them twice – once when they hired me and once when they fired me."

The season had few highlights: 17-year-old goalkeeper Tim Flowers was named player of the year. Docherty's tenure as manager is also remembered for his removal of Assistant Manager Jim Barron and Coach Frank Upton to make way for his family members; this was challenged at an Employment Tribunal in favour of Barron and Upton.

== Results ==
=== Football League Second Division ===
A total of 22 teams competed in the Football League Second Division in the 1984–85 season. Each team played every other team twice: once at their stadium, and once at the opposition's. Three points were awarded to teams for each win, one point for a draw, and none for a defeat.

| 25 August 1984 1 | Wolves | 2–2 | Sheffield United | Molineux |
| | Dodd 17'; Langley 18' | | Edwards 50'; Arnott 80' | Attendance: 14,908 |

| 1 September 1984 2 | Leeds United | 3-2 | Wolves | Elland Road |
| | Wright 40'; Lorimer 63'; Wright 70' | | Ainscow 23'; Dougherty 52' | Attendance: 17,843 |

| 4 September 1984 3 | Wolves | 2-0 | Manchester City | Molineux |
| | Dougherty 11'; McCarthy 28' (o.g.) | | | Attendance: 13,255 |

| 8 September 1984 4 | Wolves | 1-0 | Charlton Athletic | Molineux |
| | Langley 53' | | | Attendance: 10,587 |

| 15 September 1984 5 | Middlesbrough | 1-1 | Wolves | Ayresome Park |
| | Mowbray 34' | | Buckland 34' | Attendance: 4677 |

| 19 September 1984 6 | Oxford United | 3-1 | Wolves | Manor Ground |
| | Aldridge 15'; Biggins 74'; Aldridge 75' | | Langan 55' (o.g.) | Attendance: 11,930 |

| 22 September 1984 7 | Wolves | 0-2 | Birmingham | Molineux |
| | | | Kuhl 79'; Hopkins 84' | Attendance: 16,698 |

| 29 September 1984 8 | Barnsley | 5-1 | Wolves | Oakwell |
| | Geddis 29'; Agnew 57'; Geddis 59'; Geddis 62' (pen.); Owen 85' | | Dodd 21' | Attendance: 5,566 |

| 6 October 1984 9 | Wolves | 2-3 | Notts County | Molineux |
| | Buckland 9'; Langley 21' | | O'Neill 25'; Harkouk 33'; Pender 58' (o.g.) | Attendance: 7,676 |

| 13 October 1984 10 | Oldham Athletic | 3-2 | Wolves | Boundary Park |
| | Parker 10'; Palmer 39'; Henry 63' | | Tony Evans 27'; Tony Evans 90' | Attendance: 3,856 |

| 20 October 1984 11 | Wolves | 2-1 | Crystal Palace | Molineux |
| | Tony Evans 8'; Melrose 58' | | Cummins 78' (pen.) | Attendance: 6,665 |

| 27 October 1984 12 | Portsmouth | 0-1 | Wolves | Fratton Park |
| | | | Melrose 58' | Attendance: 15,291 |

| 3 November 1984 13 | Wolves | 3-0 | Cardiff | Molineux |
| | Pender 59'; Buckland 66'; Tony Evans 86' | | | Attendance: 7,537 |

| 10 November 1984 14 | Grimsby Town | 5-1 | Wolves | Blundell Park |
| | Wilkinson 10'; Barnes 42' (o.g.); Bonnyman 51' (pen.); Drinkell 75'; Ford 85' | | Langley 52' | Attendance: 7,220 |

| 17 November 1984 15 | Wolves | 3-3 | Wimbledon | Molineux |
| | Barnes 14'; Ainscow 36'; Butler 38' | | Cork 31'; Winterburn 74'; Morris 84' | Attendance: 7,134 |

| 24 November 1984 16 | Fulham | 1-2 | Wolves | Craven Cottage |
| | Houghton 17' | | Buckland 56'; Cartwright 68' | Attendance: 7,049 |

| 1 December 1984 17 | Wolves | 0-1 | Brighton & Hove Albion | Molineux |
| | | | Young 44' | Attendance: 7,463 |

| 8 December 1984 18 | Huddersfield Town | 3-1 | Wolves | Leeds Road |
| | Cooper 40'; Cooper 41'; Burke 61' | | Buckland 31' | Attendance: 8,216 |

| 15 December 1984 19 | Wolves | 0-3 | Blackburn Rovers | Molineux |
| | | | Randall 46'; Quinn 80'; Quinn 82' | Attendance: 7,598 |

| 22 December 1984 20 | Wolves | 0-2 | Leeds United | Molineux |
| | | | Gray 35'; McCluskey 59' | Attendance: 9,259 |

| 26 December 1984 21 | Shrewsbury Town | 2-1 | Wolves | Gay Meadow |
| | Robinson 44'; McNally 78' | | Ainscow 56' | Attendance: 9,183 |

| 29 December 1984 22 | Manchester City | 4-0 | Wolves | Maine Road |
| | Barker 9'; Phillips 42'; Smith 69'; Wilson 88' | | | Attendance: 22,022 |

| 1 January 1985 23 | Wolves | 0-2 | Carlisle United | Molineux |
| | | | O'Riordan 22'; Poskett 29' | Attendance: 6,246 |

| 12 January 1985 24 | Wolves | 0-0 | Middlesbrough | Molineux |
| | | | | Attendance: 6,152 |

| 26 January 1985 25 | Sheffield United | 2-2 | Wolves | Bramall Lane |
| | Cockerill 46'; Pender 57' (o.g.) | | Campbell Chapman 51'; Butler 88' | Attendance: 9,141 |

| 2 February 1985 26 | Wolves | 0-1 | Barnsley | Molineux |
| | | | Futcher 54' | Attendance: 6,348 |

| 23 February 1985 27 | Cardiff City | 0-0 | Wolves | Ninian Park |
| | | | | Attendance: 4,694 |

| 2 March 1985 28 | Wolves | 0-0 | Portsmouth | Molineux |
| | | | | Attendance: 7,985 |

| 5 March 1985 29 | Wolves | 0-1 | Grimsby Town | Molineux |
| | | | Ford 55' | Attendance: 6,127 |

| 9 March 1985 30 | Crystal Palace | 0-0 | Wolves | Selhurst Park |
| | | | | Attendance: 5,413 |

| 12 March 1985 31 | Charlton Athletic | 1-0 | Wolves | The Valley |
| | Flannagan 24' | | | Attendance: 3,905 |

| 16 March 1985 32 | Wolves | 0-3 | Oldham Athletic | Molineux |
| | | | Quinn 10' (pen.); Ward 62'; Palmer 89' | Attendance: 5,273 |

| 23 March 1985 33 | Notts County | 4-1 | Wolves | Meadow Lane |
| | Young 59'; Harkouk 66'; Harkouk 77'; Fashanu 87' | | Hankin 85' | Attendance: 5,561 |

| 30 March 1985 34 | Birmingham City | 1-0 | Wolves | St. Andrew's (stadium) |
| | Geddis 80' | | | Attendance: 10,230 |

| 6 April 1985 35 | Wolves | 0-1 | Shrewsbury Town | Molineux |
| | | | Herbert 22' (o.g.) | Attendance: 7,258 |

| 8 April 1985 36 | Carlisle United | 0-1 | Wolves | Brunton Park |
| | | | Evans 62' | Attendance: 4021 |

| 13 April 1985 37 | Wolves | 1-2 | Oxford United | Molineux |
| | Campbell Chapman 60' | | Briggs 58'; Brock 62' | Attendance: 7,258 |

| 20 April 1985 38 | Wimbledon | 1-1 | Wolves | Brunton Park |
| | Sayer 36' | | Ainscow 51' | Attendance: 3,277 |

| 27 April 1985 39 | Wolves | 0-4 | Fulham | Molineux |
| | | | Houghton 51'; Sealy 13'; Sealy 40'; Sealy 54' | Attendance: 6,172 |

| 4 May 1985 40 | Brighton & Hove Albion | 5-1 | Wolves | Goldstone Ground |
| | Worthington 10'; Penney 24'; Worthington (Pen) 27'; Biley 54'; Connor 79' | | O'Reilly 41' (o.g.) | Attendance: 8,581 |

| 6 May 1985 41 | Wolves | 2-1 | Huddersfield | Molineux |
| | Ainscow 37'; Derek Ryan 49' | | Lillis 55' (pen.) | Attendance: 4,422 |

| 11 May 1985 42 | Blackburn Rovers | 3-0 | Wolves | Ewood Park |
| | Fazackerley 40' (pen.); Keeley 63'; Lowey 64' | | | Attendance: 9,543 |

Final table

| Pos | Team | Pld | W | D | L | GF | GA | GD | Pts |
|---|---|---|---|---|---|---|---|---|---|
| 17 | Charlton Athletic | 42 | 11 | 12 | 19 | 47 | 63 | -13 | 45 |
| 18 | Sheffield United | 42 | 10 | 14 | 18 | 54 | 66 | -12 | 44 |
| 19 | Middlesbrough | 42 | 10 | 10 | 22 | 41 | 57 | -16 | 40 |
| 20 | Notts County (R) | 42 | 10 | 7 | 25 | 40 | 73 | –33 | 37 |
| 21 | Cardiff City (R) | 42 | 9 | 8 | 25 | 47 | 79 | -32 | 35 |
| 22 | Wolverhampton Wanderers | 42 | 8 | 9 | 25 | 37 | 79 | -42 | 33 |

Source: Footballstatisticsresults.co.uk

Results by round

| Round | 1 | 2 | 3 | 4 | 5 | 6 | 7 | 8 | 9 | 10 | 11 | 12 | 13 | 14 | 15 | 16 | 17 | 18 | 19 | 20 | 21 | 22 | 23 | 24 | 25 | 26 | 27 | 28 | 29 | 30 | 31 | 32 | 33 | 34 | 35 | 36 | 37 | 38 | 39 | 40 | 41 | 42 |
|---|---|---|---|---|---|---|---|---|---|---|---|---|---|---|---|---|---|---|---|---|---|---|---|---|---|---|---|---|---|---|---|---|---|---|---|---|---|---|---|---|---|---|
| Result | D | L | W | W | D | L | L | L | L | L | W | W | W | L | D | W | L | L | L | L | L | L | L | D | D | L | D | D | L | D | L | L | L | L | L | W | L | D | L | L | W | L |
| Position | 9 | 16 | 11 | 8 | 10 | 11 | 14 | 14 | 15 | 19 | 17 | 16 | 13 | 17 | 16 | 14 | 13 | 15 | 15 | 15 | 18 | 20 | 20 | 20 | 20 | 20 | 20 | 20 | 20 | 20 | 20 | 20 | 21 | 21 | 21 | 20 | 20 | 21 | 22 | 22 | 22 | 22 |

Source: Statto.com
W = Win; D = Draw; L = Loss

=== FA Cup ===
| 5 January 1985 R3 | Wolverhampton Wanderers | 1–1 | Huddersfield Town | Molineux |
| | Pender 40' | | Tempest 32' | Attendance: 8,593 |

| 23 January 1985 R3 Replay | Huddersfield Town | 3–1 | Wolverhampton Wanderers | Leeds Road |
| | Lillis 39' (pen.); Lillis 46'; Pugh 87' | | Ainscow 56' | Attendance: 7,055 |

=== League Cup ===
Round 2

| 24 September 1984 Round 2.1 | Port Vale | 1–2 | Wolverhampton Wanderers | Vale Park |
| | Brown 30' | | Evans 49'; Dodd 83' | Attendance: 6.949 |

| 9 October 1984 Round 2.2 | Wolverhampton Wanderers | 0–0 | Port Vale | Molineux |
| | Pender 40' | | Tempest 32' | Attendance: 5,964 |

Wolves Progress on Aggregate Results

Round 3

| 30 October 1984 Round 3.1 | Southampton | 2–2 | Wolverhampton Wanderers | The Dell |
| | Wright 35'; Wallace 89' | | Melrose 22'; Melrose 47' | Attendance: 14,164 |

| 6 November 1984 Round 3.2 | Wolverhampton Wanderers | 0–2 | Southampton | Molineux Stadium |
| | | | Wallace 13'; Jordan 89' | Attendance: 13,064 |

Wolves Lost on Aggregate Results

== Players ==
Key:
‡ On loan from another club * First appearance(s) for the club

- # = Squad number
- Pos = Playing position
- P = Number of games played
- G = Number of goals scored
- GK = Goalkeeper
- DF = Defender
- MF = Midfielder
- FW = Forward
- = Yellow cards
- = Red cards
- † Permanent player left club during the season
- ¤ Loaned to another club for part or all of season

Correct as of end of season. Starting appearances are listed first, followed by substitute appearances in parentheses where applicable.

| Pos | Name | P | G | P | G | P | G | P | G | P | G | A yellow card | A red card | Notes |
| Pos | Name | League | | FA Cup | | League Cup | | Other | | Total | | Discipline | | Notes |
|---|---|---|---|---|---|---|---|---|---|---|---|---|---|---|
| GK | (England) Tim Flowers | 38 | 0 | 2 | 0 | 4 | 0 | 0 | 0 | 44 | 0 | 0 | 0 | |
| GK | (England) Scott Barrett | 4 | 0 | 0 | 0 | 0 | 0 | 0 | 0 | 4 | 0 | 0 | 0 | |
| GK | (England) John Burridge | 0 | 0 | 0 | 0 | 0 | 0 | 0 | 0 | 4 | 0 | 0 | 0 | |
| DF | (England) John Humphrey | 42 | 0 | 2 | 0 | 4 | 0 | 0 | 0 | 48 | 0 | 2 | 0 | |
| DF | (Republic of Ireland) John Pender | 34(2) | 1 | 2 | 1 | 3 | 0 | 0 | 0 | 39(2) | 2 | 9 | 0 | |
| DF | (England) David Barnes | 23 | 1 | 2 | 0 | 3 | 0 | 0 | 0 | 28 | 1 | 1 | 0 | |
| DF | (England) Alan Dodd | 20 | 2 | 0 | 0 | 4 | 1 | 0 | 0 | 24 | 3 | 2 | 0 | |
| DF | (England) Peter Zelem | 16 | 0 | 0 | 0 | 0 | 0 | 0 | 0 | 16 | 0 | 1 | 0 | |
| DF | (England) Geoff Palmer | 8 | 0 | 0 | 0 | 1 | 0 | 0 | 0 | 9 | 0 | 1 | 0 | |
| DF | (England) David Heywood | 7 | 0 | 1 | 0 | 0 | 0 | 0 | 0 | 8 | 0 | 0 | 0 | |
| DF | (England) Mick Coady | 6(1) | 0 | 0 | 0 | 0 | 0 | 0 | 0 | 6(1) | 0 | 0 | 0 | |
| DF | (England) Nicky Sinclair | 1 | 0 | 0 | 0 | 0 | 0 | 0 | 0 | 1 | 0 | 1 | 0 | |
| MF | (England) Alan Ainscow | 40(2) | 5 | 2 | 1 | 2(1) | 0 | 0 | 0 | 44(3) | 6 | 5 | 0 | |
| MF | (England) Ian Cartwright | 23 | 1 | 1 | 0 | 4 | 0 | 0 | 0 | 28 | 1 | 0 | 0 | |
| MF | (New Zealand) Ricki Herbert | 25 | 0 | 2 | 0 | 0 | 0 | 0 | 0 | 27 | 0 | 0 | 0 | |
| MF | (England) Paul Dougherty | 10 (11) | 2 | 1 | 0 | 1 | 0 | 0 | 0 | 12 (11) | 2 | 0 | 0 | |
| MF | (England) Paul Butler | 17 (1) | 2 | 0 (1) | 0 | 3 | 0 | 0 | 0 | 20 (2) | 2 | 0 | 0 | |
| MF | (Scotland) Danny Crainie | 13 | 0 | 0 | 0 | 1(1) | 0 | 0 | 0 | 14 (1) | 0 | 2 | 0 | |
| MF | (Republic of Ireland) Derek Ryan | 6(4) | 1 | 0 | 0 | 2 | 0 | 0 | 0 | 8 (4) | 1 | 0 | 0 | |
| MF | (Republic of Ireland) Martin Bayly | 2(1) | 0 | 0 | 0 | 1 | 0 | 0 | 0 | 3 (1) | 0 | 0 | 0 | |
| FW | (England) Mark Buckland | 31(4) | 5 | 2 | 0 | 4 | 0 | 0 | 0 | 37(4) | 5 | 1 | 0 | |
| FW | (England) Tommy Langley | 22(1) | 4 | 2 | 0 | 2(1) | 0 | 0 | 0 | 26(2) | 4 | 0 | 0 | |
| FW | (England) Tony Evans | 20(3) | 5 | 1 | 0 | 3 | 1 | 0 | 0 | 24(3) | 6 | 0 | 0 | |
| FW | (England) Campbell Chapman | 18(2) | 2 | 2 | 0 | 1 | 0 | 0 | 0 | 24(3) | 2 | 1 | 0 | |
| FW | (England) Ray Hankin | 9(1) | 1 | 0 | 0 | 0 | 0 | 0 | 0 | 9(1) | 1 | 0 | 0 | |
| FW | (Scotland) Jim Melrose | 6(1) | 2 | 0 | 0 | 2 | 2 | 0 | 0 | 8(1) | 4 | 0 | 0 | |
| FW | (England) Peter Eastoe | 8 | 0 | 0 | 0 | 0 | 0 | 0 | 0 | 8 | 0 | 0 | 0 | |
| FW | (England) Andy King | 8 | 0 | 0 | 0 | 0 | 0 | 0 | 0 | 8 | 0 | 2 | 0 | |
| FW | (England) Steve Biggins | 4 | 0 | 0 | 0 | 0 | 0 | 0 | 0 | 4 | 0 | 0 | 0 | |
| FW | (England) Cavern Chapman | 1 | 0 | 0 | 0 | 0 | 0 | 0 | 0 | 1 | 0 | 0 | 0 | |
| FW | (England) Steve Blackwell | 1 | 0 | 0 | 0 | 0 | 0 | 0 | 0 | 1 | 0 | 0 | 0 | |
| FW | (England) Graham Rodger | 1 | 0 | 0 | 0 | 0 | 0 | 0 | 0 | 1 | 0 | 0 | 0 | |

Source: Wolverhampton Wanderers: The Complete Record

== Transfers ==
=== In ===
| Date | Player | From | Fee |
|---|---|---|---|
| 26 June 1984 | (England) Tony Evans | Crystal Palace | Free |
| 6 July 1984 | (England) Tommy Langley | Coventry City | Free |
| 22 August 1984 | (England) Alan Ainscow | Eastern Hong Kong | Undisclosed |
| 25 August 1984 | (England) Tim Flowers | Wolves Under 18 | Free |
| 25 August 1984 | (England) Derek Ryan (footballer) | Wolves Under 18 | Free |
| 27 September 1984 | (England) Scott Barrett | Ilkeston Town | Undisclosed |
| 3 October 1984 | (England) David Barnes | Ipswich Town | £44,000 |
| 30 October 1984 | (New Zealand) Ricki Herbert | Sydney Olympic | Free |
| 29 December 1984 | (England) Dayid Heywood | Wolves Under 18 | Free |
| 23 February 1984 | (England) Campbell Chapman | Wolves Under 18 | Free |
| 10 January 1985 | (England) Mick Coady | Sydney Olympic | Undisclosed |
| 31 January 1985 | (England) Andy King | SC Cambuur | Undisclosed |
| 23 February 1985 | (England) Cavern Chapman | Wolves Under 18 | Free |
| 8 March 1985 | (England) Peter Zelem | Chester City | £15,000 |
| 9 March 1985 | (England) Ryan Hankin | Peterborough United | Free |
| 20 April 1985 | (England) Steve Blackwell | Wolves Under 18 | Free |

Source: Wolves Complete History: Transfers A-Z

=== Out ===
| Date | Player | To | Fee |
|---|---|---|---|
| 4 July 1984 | (England) Melvyn Eves | Sheffield United | Free |
| 13 August 1984 | (England) Kenny Hibbitt | Coventry City | Undisclosed |
| 24 August 1984 | (England) Steve Mardenborough | Swansea City | Free |
| 24 August 1984 | (England) Wayne Clarke | Birmingham City | £80,000 |
| 12 September 1984 | (England) Tony Towner | Charlton Athletic | £15,000 |
| 26 October 1984 | (England) John Burridge | Sheffield United | Undisclosed |
| 22 November 1984 | (England) Geoff Palmer | Burnley | Undisclosed |
| 19 January 1985 | (England) Alan Dodd | Stoke City | Released |
| May 1985 | (England) Cavern Chapman | - | Released |
| May 1985 | (England) Steve Blackwell | - | Released |

Source: Wolves Complete History: Transfers A-Z

=== Loans in ===
| Start date | Player | From | End date |
|---|---|---|---|
| 13 September 1984 | (Scotland) Jim Melrose | Celtic | Unknown |
| 22 September 1984 | (England) Nicky Sinclair | Oldham Athletic | Unknown |
| 18 January 1985 | (England) Peter Zelem | Chester City | 8 March 1985 (Made Permanent) |
| 8 February 1985 | (England) Peter Eastoe | West Bromwich Albion | Unknown |
| 9 March 1985 | (England) Steve Biggins | Derby County | Unknown |

Source: Wolves Complete History: Transfers A-Z

=== Loans out ===
| Start date | Player | From | End date |
|---|---|---|---|
| 21 September 1984 | (England) John Burridge | Derby County | 26 October 1984 |
| 21 January 1985 | (Republic of Ireland) Martin Bayly | Coventry City | Made Permanent |
| 7 February 1985 | (England) Paul Dougherty | Torquay United | |
| 18 January 1985 | (England) Paul Butler | Hereford | Made Permanent |
| 27 February 1985 | (England) Tony Evans | Bolton Wanderers | |
| 8 March 1985 | (England) Tommy Langley | Aldershot | |
| 13 March 1985 | (Scotland) Danny Crainie | Blackpool | |

Source: Wolves Complete History: Transfers A-Z

== Management and coaching staff ==
| Position | Name |
|---|---|
| Manager | Tommy Docherty |
| Assistant manager | Jim Barron |
| Head coach | Sammy Chapman |
| Coach | Frank Upton |
