= 2001–02 Birmingham City F.C. season =

Birmingham City F.C.
2001–02 season
- Chairman: David Gold
- Manager: Trevor Francis (until 15 October); Mick Mills and Jim Barron (joint caretakers); Steve Bruce (from 12 December)
- Ground: St Andrew's
- First Division: 5th
- Play-offs: Winners
- FA Cup: Third round
- League Cup: Third round
- Top goalscorer: League: Tommy Mooney (13); All: Tommy Mooney (15)
- Highest home attendance: 29,178 vs Sheffield United, 21 April 2002
- Lowest home attendance: 12,015 vs Southend United, League Cup first round, 22 August 2001
- Average home league attendance: 21,978

The 2001–02 season was Birmingham City Football Club's 99th in the Football League. They finished in 5th position in the 24-team Football League First Division, thus qualifying for the play-offs, and were successful in the final, beating Norwich City in a penalty shootout to gain promotion to the Premier League. Birmingham entered the 2001–02 FA Cup at the third round and lost to Liverpool in that round, and after entering the League Cup in the first round, lost to Manchester City in the third.

Trevor Francis was dismissed as manager in October with Birmingham mid-table in the First Division. Mick Mills and Jim Barron acted as caretakers until December, when former Crystal Palace manager Steve Bruce was appointed. French manufacturers Le Coq Sportif supplied Birmingham's kit for the fourth consecutive season, and mobile phone retailer Phones4U were the new shirt sponsors. Tommy Mooney was top scorer with 15 goals, of which 13 were scored in the league.

== Football League First Division ==
Trevor Francis was dismissed as manager in October with Birmingham mid-table in the First Division. Mick Mills and Jim Barron acted as caretakers until December, when former Crystal Palace manager Steve Bruce was appointed. Under his management Birmingham improved to finish fifth in the First Division for the third season running, qualifying for the play-offs yet again. This season, however, Birmingham finally tasted success: after beating Millwall 2–1 on aggregate in the semi-final, they faced Norwich City in the play-off final at the Millennium Stadium. After normal time ended goalless, the match went to extra time, only for Norwich's Iwan Roberts to score in the first minute of extra time. However, Geoff Horsfield equalised 11 minutes later and, with no further goals, the match went to a penalty shoot-out. Birmingham won 4–2 to finally gain promotion to the Premier League, 16 seasons after their previous top-flight campaign.

=== Match details ===
Date	League position	Opponents	Venue	Result	Score F–A	Scorers	Attendance	Report
11 August 2001	19th	Wimbledon	A	L	1–3	B. Hughes 87'	9,142	
19 August 2001	8th	Millwall	H	W	4–0	B. Hughes 22', 27', Horsfield 30', Eaden 45'	19,091	
25 August 2001	7th	Walsall	A	W	2–1	Mooney 20', Horsfield 41'	7,245	
27 August 2001	3rd	Stockport County	H	W	2–1	Grainger 2', Mooney 21' pen.	18,478	
8 September 2001	3rd	Sheffield Wednesday	H	W	2–0	A. Johnson 43', B. Hughes 63'	19,421	
15 September 2001	7th	Manchester City	A	L	0–3		31,714	
18 September 2001	9th	Burnley	H	L	2–3	A. Johnson (2) 19', 40'	18,426	
23 September 2001	14th	Preston North End	H	L	0–1		23,004	
26 September 2001	14th	Watford	A	D	3–3	B. Hughes 4', Horsfield 47', Grainger 85'	13,091	
29 September 2001	14th	Crewe Alexandra	A	D	0–0		7,314	
13 October 2001	12th	Barnsley	A	W	3–1	Marcelo 36', Horsfield 55', Furlong 83'	11,910	
18 October 2001	10th	Nottingham Forest	A	D	0–0		18,210	
20 October 2001	6th	Bradford City	H	W	4–0	Marcelo (3) 37', 45', 48', Sonner 39'	25,011	
23 October 2001	5th	Gillingham	H	W	2–1	Horsfield (2) 36', 47'	27,101	
26 October 2001	6th	Grimsby Town	A	L	1–3	Marcelo 49'	5,419	
30 October 2001	6th	Portsmouth	A	D	1–1	Marcelo 25'	15,612	
4 November 2001	10th	Rotherham United	H	D	2–2	Branston 45' o.g., Horsfield 51'	28,436	
7 November 2001	10th	West Bromwich Albion	H	L	0–1		23,554	
17 November 2001	12th	Sheffield United	A	L	0–4		15,686	
25 November 2001	11th	Coventry City	H	W	2–0	Marcelo (2) 17', 61'	18,279	
30 November 2001	11th	Gillingham	A	D	1–1	Marcelo 63'	8,575	
8 December 2001	10th	Norwich City	H	W	4–0	Mooney (3) 30', 45', 58' pen., Marcelo 46'	17,310	
11 December 2001	9th	Crystal Palace	H	W	1–0	Mooney 64' pen.	20,119	
16 December 2001	10th	Wolverhampton Wanderers	A	L	1–2	Marcelo 40'	21,482	
22 December 2001	7th	Walsall	H	W	1–0	Purse 14' pen.	20,127	
26 December 2001	8th	Sheffield Wednesday	A	W	1–0	Horsfield 77'	24,335	
29 December 2001	6th	Stockport County	A	W	3–0	Vickers 18', Marcelo 49', Mooney 76'	5,827	
1 January 2002	7th	Nottingham Forest	H	D	1–1	Mooney 4'	19,770	
10 January 2002	6th	Millwall	A	D	1–1	Mooney 45'	11,856	
19 January 2002	8th	Wimbledon	H	L	0–2		17,766	
29 January 2002	8th	West Bromwich Albion	A	L	0–1		25,266	
16 February 2002	9th	Barnsley	H	W	1–0	John 51'	19,208	
23 February 2002	9th	Watford	H	W	3–2	Purse 21', Mooney (2) 42', 53' pen.	18,059	
26 February 2002	8th	Burnley	A	W	1–0	Mooney 25'	13,504	
2 March 2002	9th	Preston North End	A	L	0–1		15,543	
5 March 2002	9th	Manchester City	H	L	1–2	M. Johnson 4'	24,160	
9 March 2002	10th	Wolverhampton Wanderers	H	D	2–2	John 36', Devlin 45'	22,104	
12 March 2002	7th	Bradford City	A	W	3–1	Purse 6', John 31', Horsfield 82'	13,105	
15 March 2002	7th	Norwich City	A	W	1–0	John 22'	18,258	
24 March 2002	7th	Coventry City	A	D	1–1	Horsfield 81'	17,945	
30 March 2002	6th	Grimsby Town	H	W	4–0	B. Hughes (2) 22', 31', John 50', D. Johnson 64'	23,249	
1 April 2002	6th	Crystal Palace	A	D	0–0		19,598	
7 April 2002	6th	Portsmouth	H	D	1–1	John 2'	25,030	
10 April 2002	4th	Crewe Alexandra	H	W	3–1	John 30', Carter 45', Mooney 49'	28,615	
13 April 2002	4th	Rotherham United	A	D	2–2	Grainger 38', Beech 70' o.g.	10,536	
21 April 2002	5th	Sheffield United	H	W	2–0	Horsfield 61', Grainger 63'	29,178	

=== League table ===
Pos	Team	Pld	W	D	L	GF	GA	GD	Pts	Qualification or relegation
3	Wolverhampton Wanderers	46	25	11	10	76	43	+33	86	Qualification for the First Division play-offs
4	Millwall	46	22	11	13	69	48	+21	77	Qualification for the First Division play-offs
5	Birmingham City (O, P)	46	21	13	12	70	49	+21	76	Qualification for the First Division play-offs
6	Norwich City	46	22	9	15	60	51	+9	75	Qualification for the First Division play-offs
7	Burnley	46	21	12	13	70	62	+8	75	

Rules for classification: 1) Points; 2) Goal difference; 3) Goals scored
(O) Play-off winners; (P) Promoted

=== Results summary ===
Overall								Home						Away					
Pld	W	D	L	GF	GA	GD	Pts	W	D	L	GF	GA	GD	W	D	L	GF	GA	GD
46	21	13	12	70	49	+21	76	14	4	5	44	20	+24	7	9	7	26	29	−3

=== Play-offs ===
Round	Date	Opponents	Venue	Result	Score F–A	Scorers	Attendance	Report
Semifinal 1st leg	28 April 2002	Millwall	H	D	1–1	B. Hughes 56'	28,282	
Semifinal 2nd leg	2 May 2002	Millwall	A	W	1–0; 2–1 agg.	John 90'	16,391	

==== Final ====
12 May 2002 Final	Birmingham City	1–1 (a.e.t.) (4–2 p)	Norwich City	Millennium Stadium, Cardiff
15:30 BST (UTC+01)	Horsfield 102'		Roberts 91'	Attendance: 71,597; Referee: Graham Barber
	Penalties
	John (penalty scored); Devlin (penalty scored); Lazaridis (penalty scored); Carter (penalty scored)		(penalty scored) Roberts; (penalty missed) Mulryne; (penalty missed) Sutch; (penalty scored) Easton

== FA Cup ==
Round	Date	Opponents	Venue	Result	Score F–A	Scorers	Attendance	Report
Third round	5 January 2002	Liverpool	A	L	0–3		40,875	

== League Cup ==
Round	Date	Opponents	Venue	Result	Score F–A	Scorers	Attendance	Report
First round	22 August 2001	Southend United	H	W	3–0	Mooney (2) 7', 90' pen., Whelan 16' o.g.	12,015	
Second round	11 September 2001	Bristol Rovers	A	W	3–0	A. Johnson 45', M. Johnson 62', B. Hughes 68'	5,582	
Third round	10 October 2001	Manchester City	A	L	0–6		13,112	

== Transfers ==
=== In ===
Date	Player	Club†	Fee	Ref
18 June 2001	Nico Vaesen	Huddersfield Town)	Undisclosed	
1 July 2001	Tommy Mooney	(Watford)	Free	
1 July 2001	Chris Ward	Lancaster City	£25,000	
8 August 2001	Kevin Poole	Unattached	Free	
17 December 2001	Steve Vickers	Middlesbrough	£425,000	
31 January 2002	Jeff Kenna	Blackburn Rovers	Free	
8 February 2002	Stern John	Nottingham Forest	£100,000	
8 March 2002	Damien Johnson	Blackburn Rovers	Undisclosed	
13 March 2002	Tom Williams	Peterborough United	Undisclosed	
22 March 2002	Olivier Tébily	Celtic	£700,000	
8 May 2002	Paul Devlin	Sheffield United	c. £200,000	

† Brackets round club names indicate the player's contract with that club had expired before he joined Birmingham.

=== Out ===
Date	Player	Fee	Joined†	Ref
13 July 2001	Jon Bass	Free	Hartlepool United	
26 October 2001	Kevin Poole	Free	Bolton Wanderers	
7 February 2002	Marcelo	Undisclosed	Walsall	
7 February 2002	Martyn O'Connor	Undisclosed	Walsall	
8 March 2002	David Burrows	Released	(Sheffield Wednesday)	
8 March 2002	Jacques Williams	Released	(Scarborough)	
8 March 2002	Mickael Sabathier	Released		
15 March 2002	Ross Diamond	Released		
30 June 2002	Jon McCarthy	Released	(Port Vale)	
30 June 2002	Dele Adebola	Released	(Crystal Palace)	
30 June 2002	Danny Sonner	Released	(Walsall)	
10 July 2002	David Holdsworth	Released	(Bolton Wanderers)	

† Brackets round a club denote the player joined that club after his Birmingham City contract expired.

=== Loan in ===
Date	Player	Club	Return	Ref
10 August 2001	Carlos Ferrari	Mirassol	5 March 2002	
24 August 2001	Alan Kelly	Blackburn Rovers	One month	
6 September 2001	Bjørn Otto Bragstad	Derby County	One month	
15 November 2001	Curtis Fleming	Middlesbrough	One month	
16 November 2001	Steve Vickers	Middlesbrough	One month	
21 December 2001	Arkadiusz Bąk	Polonia Warsaw	18 February 2002	
24 December 2001	Jeff Kenna	Blackburn Rovers	One month	
4 February 2002	Paul Devlin	Sheffield United	Three months	
11 March 2002	Tom Williams	Peterborough United	13 March 2002	
28 March 2002	Michael Hughes	Wimbledon	End of season	

=== Loan out ===
Date	Player	Club	Return	Ref
17 August 2001	Graham Hyde	Chesterfield	Two months	
21 September 2001	Tony Capaldi	Hereford United	1 January 2002	
2 October 2001	Chris Ward	Forest Green Rovers	One month	
18 January 2002	David Holdsworth	Walsall	End of season	
4 February 2002	Paul Furlong	Sheffield United	One month	
20 March 2002	Dele Adebola	Oldham Athletic	One month	
28 March 2002	Jon McCarthy	Sheffield Wednesday	One month	
29 March 2002	Chris Ward	Southport	One month	

== Appearances and goals ==
Numbers in parentheses denote appearances made as a substitute.
Players marked † left the club during the playing season.
Players with names in italics and marked * were on loan from another club for the whole of their season with Birmingham.
Players listed with no appearances have been in the matchday squad but only as unused substitutes.
Key to positions: GK – Goalkeeper; DF – Defender; MF – Midfielder; FW – Forward

Players' appearances and goals by competition
No.	Pos.	Nat.	Name	League		FA Cup		League Cup		Play-offs		Total		Discipline	
No.	Pos.	Nat.	Name	Apps	Goals	Apps	Goals	Apps	Goals	Apps	Goals	Apps	Goals	A yellow rectangle, denoting the yellow penalty card shown to a player being cautioned	A red rectangle, denoting the red penalty card shown to a player being sent off
1	GK	ENG	Ian Bennett	19	0	1	0	0	0	0	0	20	0	0	0
2	DF	ENG	Nicky Eaden	25 (5)	1	0	0	3	0	0	0	28 (5)	0	0	0
3	DF	ENG	Martin Grainger	40 (1)	4	0	0	3	0	3	0	46 (1)	4	12	1
4	MF	NIR	Danny Sonner	10 (5)	1	0	0	3	0	0	0	13 (5)	1	2	2
5	DF	ENG	Darren Purse	36 (1)	3	1	0	1	0	2	0	40 (1)	3	11	1
6	DF	ENG	David Holdsworth	3 (1)	0	0	0	1	0	0	0	4 (1)	0	0	0
7	MF	NIR	Jon McCarthy	3 (1)	0	0	0	0	0	0	0	3 (1)	0	0	0
8	FW	BRA	Marcelo †	17 (5)	12	0 (1)	0	0 (3)	0	0	0	17 (9)	12	1	0
8	FW	TRI	Stern John	15	8	0	0	0	0	3	1	18	8	0	0
9	FW	ENG	Geoff Horsfield	34 (7)	11	1	0	3	0	3	1	41 (7)	12	7	0
10	MF	ENG	Bryan Hughes	28 (4)	7	0 (1)	0	2	1	3	1	33 (5)	9	4	0
11	MF	AUS	Stan Lazaridis	23 (10)	0	0	0	1 (1)	0	0 (3)	0	24 (14)	0	1	0
12	MF	CAY	Martyn O'Connor †	24	0	0 (1)	0	0 (1)	0	0	0	24 (2)	0	5	0
12	MF	NIR	Michael Hughes *	3	0	0	0	0	0	0	0	3	0	0	0
13	MF	ENG	Graham Hyde	1 (4)	0	0	0	0	0	0	0	1 (4)	0	1	0
14	MF	ENG	Curtis Woodhouse	18 (10)	0	1	0	2 (1)	0	0	0	21 (11)	0	7	1
15	DF	ENG	Jerry Gill	14	0	1	0	2	0	0	0	17	0	2	0
16	FW	ENG	Tommy Mooney	30 (4)	13	1	0	1	2	3	0	35 (4)	15	2	0
17	DF	JAM	Michael Johnson	31 (2)	1	0	0	3	1	1	0	35 (2)	2	3	0
18	GK	BEL	Nico Vaesen	22 (1)	0	0	0	2	0	3	0	27 (1)	0	1	0
19	FW	ENG	Andrew Johnson	9 (14)	3	1	0	2	1	0 (2)	0	12 (16)	4	3	0
20	MF	CYP	Tom Williams	4	0	0	0	0	0	0	0	4	0	0	0
21	MF	COD	Trésor Luntala	9 (6)	0	0	0	1	0	0	0	10 (6)	0	0	0
22	DF	ENG	David Burrows †	9 (3)	0	1	0	1 (1)	0	0	0	11 (4)	0	0	0
22	MF	NIR	Damien Johnson	5 (3)	1	0	0	0	0	1	0	6 (3)	1	2	0
25	FW	ENG	Paul Furlong	2 (9)	1	0	0	0 (2)	0	0	0	2 (11)	1	3	0
26	DF	CIV	Olivier Tébily	7	0	0	0	0	0	3	0	10	0	0	0
28	DF	ENG	Joey Hutchinson	0 (3)	0	0	0	1	0	0	0	1 (3)	0	0	0
29	GK	AUS	Clint Davies	0	0	0	0	0	0	0	0	0	0	0	0
30	GK	ENG	Kevin Poole †	0	0	0	0	1	0	0	0	1	0	0	0
30	DF	IRL	Curtis Fleming * †	6	0	0	0	0	0	0	0	6	0	1	0
30	MF	POL	Arkadiusz Bąk * †	2 (2)	0	1	0	0	0	0	0	3 (2)	0	0	0
31	FW	BRA	Carlos Ferrari *	0 (4)	0	0	0	0	0	0	0	0 (4)	0	0	0
32	GK	ENG	Neil Barnes	0	0	0	0	0	0	0	0	0	0	0	0
32	GK	IRL	Alan Kelly *	6	0	0	0	0	0	0	0	6	0	0	0
33	DF	NOR	Bjørn Otto Bragstad *	3	0	0	0	0	0	0	0	3	0	0	0
33	MF	ENG	Darren Carter	13 (1)	1	0	0	0	0	1 (1)	0	14 (2)	1	0	0
35	DF	ENG	Steve Vickers	13 (1)	1	1	0	0	0	2	0	16 (1)	1	0	0
36	DF	IRL	Jeff Kenna	22	0	0	0	0	0	3	0	25	0	1	0
37	MF	SCO	Paul Devlin	11 (2)	1	0	0	0	0	2	0	13 (2)	1	2	0

Players not included in matchday squads
No.	Pos.	Nat.	Name
20	MF	ENG	Jacques Williams †
23	FW	ENG	Chris Ward
24	FW	NGA	Dele Adebola
26	MF	ENG	Ross Diamond †
27	DF	NIR	Tony Capaldi
29	MF	FRA	Mickael Sabathier †
34	FW	ENG	Craig Fagan

== See also ==
- List of Birmingham City F.C. seasons
