= Norman Uprichard =

Northern Irish footballer

Personal information
- Full name: William Norman McCourt Uprichard
- Date of birth: 20 April 1928
- Place of birth: Lurgan, Northern Ireland
- Date of death: 31 January 2011 (aged 82)
- Height: 1.75 m (5 ft 9 in)
- Position: Goalkeeper

Senior career*
Years	Team	Apps	(Gls)
- Glenavon
- Distillery
1948–1949	Arsenal	0	(0)
1949–1952	Swindon Town	73	(0)
1952–1959	Portsmouth	182	(0)
1959–1960	Southend United	12	(0)
- Hastings United
- Ramsgate Athletic

International career
1951–1958	Northern Ireland	18	(0)
- * Club domestic league appearances and goals

William Norman McCourt Uprichard (20 April 1928 – 31 January 2011) was a football player for Arsenal, Portsmouth, Swindon Town and Northern Ireland.

== Gaelic football career ==
Uprichard was born in Lurgan, Northern Ireland, and as a teenager played both soccer and Gaelic football. He won a district minor league medal with St. Peter's GAC, but was subsequently banned by the GAA and told he would not receive his medal because he had signed for Glenavon. The GAA's 'rule 27' prohibited adult members at the time from playing or watching so-called foreign games. Uprichard was finally awarded his medal in 2004.

== Association football career ==
=== Club career ===
Uprichard played in goal for Glenavon and later for Distillery before signing for Arsenal in 1948 for £1,500. He never played an Arsenal first-team game, with Ted Platt and George Swindin being higher in the pecking order. He was transferred to Swindon Town in November 1949, later becoming the first choice goalkeeper.

The 1952–53 season was his last at Swindon before his transfer to Portsmouth in November 1952.

Uprichard was Eddie Lever's first signing as Pompey manager. He was later followed by Derek Dougan from Distillery. Uprichard played nearly 200 first-team games for Portsmouth in seven seasons. He later played for Southend United, Hastings United and Ramsgate Athletic.

=== International career ===
Uprichard was awarded 18 senior international caps for Northern Ireland, the first coming against Scotland in 1951. He played in the 1958 World Cup Finals in Sweden alongside Billy Bingham, Jimmy McIlroy and Danny Blanchflower. Despite sustaining a broken hand and an ankle injury, he kept the Czechoslovakia attack at bay in a play-off win which secured Northern Ireland a quarter-final berth.

His final game for Northern Ireland was, like his first, against Scotland, in November 1958. Norman died on Monday 31 January 2011 after a long illness.
