= Alan Duffy =

Alan Duffy may refer to:

- Alan Duffy (astronomer) (born 1983), astronomer and science communicator
- Alan Duffy (record label owner), founder of Imaginary Records
- Alan Duffy (footballer) (born 1949), footballer for Tranmere Rovers
- Alan Duffy, a character in Food Chain
