= Tony Towner =

English footballer

Personal information
- Full name: Antony James Towner
- Date of birth: 2 May 1955 (age 71)
- Place of birth: Brighton, England
- Height: 5 ft 9 in (1.75 m)
- Position: Winger

Youth career
- Brighton & Hove Albion

Senior career*
Years	Team	Apps	(Gls)
1973–1978	Brighton & Hove Albion	162	(24)
1978–1980	Millwall	68	(13)
1980–1983	Rotherham United	108	(11)
1983	→ Sheffield United (loan)	10	(0)
1983–1984	Wolverhampton Wanderers	31	(2)
1984–1985	Charlton Athletic	27	(2)
1985–1986	Rochdale	5	(0)
1986–1987	Cambridge United	8	(0)
1991–1992	Crawley Town		
–	Gravesend & Northfleet		
Total		419	(52)
- * Club domestic league appearances and goals

Antony James Towner (born 2 May 1955) is an English former footballer who made more than 400 appearances in the Football League playing as a right winger. He played for Brighton & Hove Albion and Rotherham United with whom he won Division 3, and was later portrayed in an episode of Chuckle Vision.

== Playing career ==
The right winger spent much of the 1970s with his hometown club Brighton & Hove Albion playing 162 times before moving to Millwall later in the decade.

Towner stated "I was a (Brighton) Albion fan as a kid, in Bevendean, and I joined them straight from school at 15, as an apprentice. I already had the 'Tiger' nickname when I got into the team in 1973 – I think it was one of Alan Duffy's. I must have tackled him a bit too hard in training, or something. Tiger was a great nickname, and I loved it."

Towner was sold from Millwall to Rotherham United along with John Seasman for a joint fee of £165,000 in 1980. £95,000 believed to be Towner's fee.

Towner played right winge and formed a partnership with teammate Ronnie Moore. Towner was a key figure in Rotherham's 1981 Division 3 winning side, doing the double over local rivals Sheffield United on the way.

Video footage of Rotherham final game of the season verus Plymouth Argyle shows Towner connecting with Moore to get the first goal in a 2–1 victory with that result crowning Rotherham as champions of the 1980-81 season.

After spending a brief loan spell at Sheffield United, Towner moved to Wolverhampton Wanderers for £80,000, where he spent the 1983–84 season in top-flight football.

Towner had been on manager Graham Hawkins' pre-season shopping list, presented to chairman Derek Dougan, but Hawkins was furious on finding that Dougan had spent so much of the budget on him whilst he and head coach Jim Barron were out of the country. Towner moved to Charlton Athletic for £15,000 at the end of the season.

Dougan had previously seen Towner play at Rotherham whilst covering TV work in Yorkshire as a pundit.

Towner started that campaign being brought off the bench in a 1-1 opening day draw at home to Liverpool and from then on in, Towner would be a regular for the Wolves, making 35 appearances and chipping in with two goals, including a long-range header past Chris Woods in a win against Norwich City.

Asked about his season at the Molineux in 2021, Towner said "I joined Wolves from Rotherham, and it was a different world, I had been there a week and then we were flying off to Sweden for pre-season. One minute I am at Rotherham and the next we are flying out to Europe – it was all very new to me. Then you have Liverpool and Arsenal in the first two games and it was very much a case of welcome to the big league. But that is what I wanted, 100 per cent. Any player wants to test himself against the very best, and Liverpool were very much the best at that time – they had so many star players."

He later played for Charlton Athletic, Rochdale and Cambridge United.

A final taste of the big time came with non-league Crawley Town in a 1991–92 FA Cup run.

Crawley came up 4–2 victors against Third Division Northampton Town with Towner being credited an assist before being knocked out the cup in the third round when they were defeated 5–0 away at Brighton, with Towner coming off the bench to a great reception against the club where it had all began.

== Popular culture ==
Towner and his Rotherham forward partner Ronnie Moore were depicted in 1996 Chuckle Vision episode "Football Heroes"

During the episode Paul Chuckle and his brother Barry Chuckle are on their way to a Rotherham United football match when they come across Towner and Moore, played by actors who ask directions to the stadium to play in a veterans match.

With the Chuckle brothers giving confusing directions, the players fail to make it to the ground in time and in a case if mistaken identity the chuckle brothers are sent out to play, resulting in them scoring an own goal and being chased off the pitch by the manager.

== Post Football ==
Since retiring from football, Towner has run and managed his own home removal business and also visits his local Brighton & Hove Albion to attend matches.

== Honours ==
Rotherham United

- Football League Third Division: 1980–81
