= Harry Cavan =

Northern Irish football administrator (1916-2000)

Henry Hartrick Cavan CBE (19 May 1916 – 16 January 2000) was vice-president of FIFA from 1960 to 1980 and senior vice-president of FIFA from 1980 to 1990, and president of the Irish Football Association from 1958 to 1994. Its Harry Cavan Youth Cup is named after him.

== Committees ==
Harry H. Cavan served on a variety of FIFA committees, including the Organising Committees for all World Cups from 1966 to 1990. He also chaired the Technical Committee, the Development Programmes Committee, the World Youth Tournament Committee, the Medical Committee and the Referees' Committee. However, Mr. Cavan will best be remembered for his distinguished role in representing the British associations as a vice-president of the FIFA Executive Committee from 1960 to 1990. He was made an Honorary Vice-president of FIFA in 1990. It fell to him to announce in 1988 the results of the vote of FIFA's executive committee: "It was a card vote, a secret vote. It resulted as follows: Brazil two, Morocco seven, the United States 10. I declare on behalf of FIFA that the host country for the 1994 World Cup will be the United States of America."

== Ambitions ==
He had long had the ambition of spreading football and the World Cup beyond its traditional borders and into the developing world. "In his role as an international soccer statesman – he acted for a short time as general secretary at the FIFA Zurich headquarters – Mr Cavan played a big part in the development of soccer in Africa, Asia and South America, regularly inspecting stadia in emerging Third World countries and ensuring that the appropriate FIFA guidelines were observed."

Cavan made conflicting statements about the prospect of a single all-Ireland football team over the years: at the IFA's Annual General Meeting in 1979, he said that "two teams in a small country like this is nonsensical", however during the 1980s when Billy Bingham's Northern Ireland side qualified for the 1982 and 1986 FIFA World Cups, he commented: "with results like we have had over the last two years, who needs a United Irish soccer side?".

== Career ==
Former Belfast Telegraph sports editor Malcolm Brodie spoke at his funeral of the esteem Mr Cavan had been held in across the globe through his role as FIFA vice-president. "His friends at home sometimes took him for granted and he was not fully appreciated by those to whom he had imparted much of his knowledge. Contrast that with the way he was held in Asia and Africa – it had to be seen to be believed." FIFA President Sepp Blatter said at his funeral "When I entered FIFA in 1975, Harry was the first person I met and, until the 1990s when he left FIFA, I was always with him and he was always with me. He always said I was his protege and I was. He believed in football's grassroots, in giving to the Third World rather than the commercialism that came in the Nineties." If Harry Cavan was alive today to see the first African World Cup, no doubt he would be saying "full marks to Sepp Blatter for getting it done."

Long-time Secretary of Ards F.C. in his birthplace of Newtownards, he held the title of its president from 1982 to 2000.

=== 1956–1973 ===
Harry Cavan spent most of his life as a full-time trade union official, first for the Association of Supervisory Staffs, Executives and Technicians (ASSET), which merged with the Association of Scientific Workers (AScW) in 1968 forming the Association of Scientific, Technical and Managerial Staffs (ASTMS). A member of the Northern Ireland Labour Party, he ran as an NILP candidate for Ards Council around 1956 in opposition to the Ulster Unionist Party. In 1963, he was the head selector for the 1963 England v Rest of the World football match. He considered football a great unifier across community divides. Despite this, some accused him of being uncharitable as in 1973 when he attempted to cancel a friendly game between the then World Champions, Brazil, and an all-Ireland select team. The game went ahead, although under the banner of southern club Shamrock Rovers F.C. rather than the original "Ireland XI", resulting in the permanent exclusion of Northern Ireland's captain, Derek Dougan from the team. This accusation ignores the fact of Dougan's age and non-selection for the previous five Northern Ireland games prior to this.

=== 1977 ===
In 1977 the inaugural staging of the FIFA World Youth Championship was held in Tunisia from 27 June to 10 July, when Harry Cavan chaired the Tournament Committee. He had spearheaded the creation of the World Youth Championship.

=== 1985 ===
In a report on the 3rd World Youth Championship in 1985 he wrote "The Youth Championship has been complimentary [sic] to the educational programmes which FIFA has organised in all the Confederations and evidence of its success is the remarkable results achieved by the 'Third World' teams. The substantial number of players who have progressed from Youth teams to the National 'A' teams and played in the FIFA World Cup or the Olympic Football Tournament, is most encouraging."

== Death and honours ==
On his death FIFA said "One of football's most senior and long-serving statesmen has died. FIFA mourns the death of Harry H. Cavan of Northern Ireland, who died on Sunday, 16 January. In expressing its condolences to Mr. Cavan's family and to the Irish Football Association, FIFA also wishes to reiterate its deep appreciation of his contributions to football and FIFA during a distinguished career.

Cavan was awarded a CBE in the 1990 Birthday Honours for services to association football, having previously received an OBE in the 1977 New Year Honours.
