= Reg Flewin =

English footballer and manager

Personal information
- Full name: Reginald Flewin
- Date of birth: 28 November 1920
- Place of birth: Portsmouth, England
- Date of death: 24 May 2008 (aged 87)
- Place of death: Shanklin, Isle of Wight, England
- Position: Central defender

Senior career*
Years	Team	Apps	(Gls)
1937–1953	Portsmouth	150	(0)

International career
1944	England (Wartime)	1	(0)

Managerial career
- 1960–1963: Stockport County
- 1963–1965: Bournemouth
- * Club domestic league appearances and goals

Reginald Flewin (28 November 1920 – 24 May 2008) was an English footballer who played as a central defender for his hometown club Portsmouth.

Flewin was discovered playing in the Hampshire League for Ryde Sports. He signed a professional contract with Portsmouth on his 17th birthday in 1937 and made his senior debut for the club against Grimsby Town in April 1939. His football career was interrupted by the outbreak of World War II, during which he served in the Royal Marines. Despite the war, Flewin occasionally played for Portsmouth in wartime football and earned an England wartime cap against Wales on 16 September 1944.

After the war, Flewin became a regular in Portsmouth's defence and was appointed the team's captain. He was part of the squad that won consecutive league titles in 1948–49 and 1949–50. In 1949, the team was expected to win the double but lost to Leicester City in the FA Cup. Flewin retired in 1953, having played 163 first-team matches for Portsmouth.

Following his playing career, Flewin transitioned into coaching. He initially took charge of Portsmouth's youth team and later became assistant manager to Eddie Lever. He remained in this role until October 1960, when he was appointed manager of Stockport County. In September 1963, he moved back south to manage Bournemouth, a position he held until resigning in 1965.

After leaving football, Flewin settled on the Isle of Wight, where he managed the Fort Warden holiday camp in Totland Bay. He died in May 2008 at the age of 87, a week after the 2008 FA Cup Final.
