= Alan Dodd =

English footballer (born 1953)

Personal information
- Full name: Alan Dodd
- Date of birth: 20 September 1953 (age 73)
- Place of birth: Stoke-on-Trent, England
- Height: 5 ft 10 in (1.78 m)
- Position: Defender

Youth career
- 1968–1969: Stoke City

Senior career*
Years	Team	Apps	(Gls)
1969–1982	Stoke City	357	(3)
1982–1985	Wolverhampton Wanderers	88	(5)
1985	Stoke City	16	(0)
1985–1986	IF Elfsborg	35	(1)
1986	→ Port Vale (loan)	2	(0)
1987–1988	GAIS	37	(3)
1987	→ Cork City (loan)	7	(0)
1988–1989	Landskrona BoIS	19	(0)
1989	Rocester		
- Goldenhill Wanderers
- Ball Haye Green
Total		561	(12)

International career
1974–1976	England U23	6	(0)
- * Club domestic league appearances and goals

Alan Dodd (born 20 September 1953) is an English former professional footballer who played in England for Stoke City, Wolverhampton Wanderers and Port Vale; he also played in Sweden and the Republic of Ireland.

An England under-23 international defender, he made 402 of his 520 Football League career appearances at Stoke City between 1972 and 1982. He was voted Stoke's Player of the Year in 1980. He helped the "Potters" to win promotion out of the Second Division in 1978–79. He spent 1982 to 1985 with Wolves and helped the club to win promotion into the First Division in 1982–83. He spent the remainder of the 1980s with various clubs across Europe, playing for IF Elfsborg, Port Vale, GAIS, Cork City, Landskrona BoIS, and Rocester. He won promotions to the Swedish top flight with both Elfsborg and GAIS.

== Career ==
Dodd was born in Stoke-on-Trent and grew up 'addicted' to football, taking a ball wherever he went. He progressed through the Stoke-on-Trent Schools team and joined the club he grew up supporting – Stoke City – ahead of several interested clubs; he signed as an apprentice in April 1968, and turned professional in October 1969. He was signed by chief scout Cliff Birks and played for the reserves at centre-half but made his first-team debut in midfield due to a large number of injuries to first-team players. Early in 1973–74, Alan Bloor's injury handed Dodd an extended run in the side. He took his chance with ease, putting in some impressive performances, and on Bloor's return manager Tony Waddington was unable to drop Dodd so moved him to right-back. He was a very versatile player and occupied all outfield positions bar centre-forward during his time at Stoke. His performances for Stoke alongside Denis Smith in 1974–75 propelled Dodd into the international scene. He made six appearances for the England under-23 team. Stoke missed out on the title and after major damage to the Victoria Ground after a severe storm, Stoke were relegated to the Second Division in 1976–77.

From 10 January 1976 to April 1978, Dodd made 102 consecutive appearances, which was ended when new manager Alan Durban brought in Manchester City's Mike Doyle. Durban reasoned that Second Division football required a more physical approach. Durban's decision irked Dodd, who said: "It took the fun out of the game for me we only spoke about the opposition rather that how we were going to play, it was not good to watch or to play in". Stoke gained promotion in 1978–79. Still, Dodd felt undervalued and was transfer listed after refusing a new contract. However, he settled his differences and forced his way back into the side playing well to earn the player of the year award for 1979–80. Dodd was granted a testimonial match against Port Vale in April 1982. In November of the same year Dodd moved to Wolverhampton Wanderers for just £40,000. He later said, "I was surprised that I went so cheaply, but I was relieved to go. I couldn't see a future at Stoke under Richie Barker, but leaving the Victoria Ground was the most upsetting day of my footballing life".

At Molineux, Dodd helped Wolves gain promotion in 1982–83, but a poor 1983–84 campaign saw them make a quick return to the second tier 1983–84. However, Dodd played well enough to win the club's Player of the Year award. With back to back relegations looming he returned to Stoke in January 1985. Stoke were enduring a truly woeful campaign themselves, and Dodd, who had now lost his pace, was regularly exposed by the speed of the forwards in the First Division as Stoke suffered an embarrassing relegation. Prompted by journalist Peter Keeling, Dodd moved to Sweden playing for IF Elfsborg, GAIS and Landskrona BoIS over a six-year period. He helped Elfsborg win promotion out of the Division 2 Södra into the Allsvenskan in 1985. He achieved the same feat with GAIS in 1987 (though the division had been renamed Division 1 Södra). He returned to Staffordshire in December 1986, playing three times on loan at Third Division side Port Vale during the Swedish mid-winter break and also played in Ireland for Cork City in December 1987. He later played non-League football in Staffordshire for Rocester, Goldenhill Wanderers and Ball Haye Green.

== Post-retirement ==
At the age of 39 he retired from playing football to run a property rental company in Stoke-on-Trent. A strict vegan, he regularly competes in marathons across Staffordshire and also enjoys attending heavy metal concerts.

== Career statistics ==
These statistics are incomplete. Source:

Appearances and goals by club, season and competition
Club	Season	League			National cup (Note: Includes FA Cup, Svenska Cupen)		League cup (Note: Includes Football League Cup)		Other		Total	
Club	Season	Division	Apps	Goals	Apps	Goals	Apps	Goals	Apps	Goals	Apps	Goals
Stoke City	1972–73	First Division	3	0	0	0	0	0	0	0	3	0
Stoke City	1973–74	First Division	31	0	1	0	4	0	2 (Note: Appearances in the Texaco Cup)	0	38	0
Stoke City	1974–75	First Division	39	0	1	0	5	0	2 (Note: Appearances in UEFA Cup)	0	47	0
Stoke City	1975–76	First Division	40	0	5	0	1	0	—		46	0
Stoke City	1976–77	First Division	42	1	1	0	2	0	—		45	1
Stoke City	1977–78	Second Division	42	0	2	0	1	0	—		45	0
Stoke City	1978–79	Second Division	38	0	1	0	5	1	—		44	1
Stoke City	1979–80	First Division	37	1	1	0	3	0	—		41	1
Stoke City	1980–81	First Division	41	1	2	0	2	0	—		45	1
Stoke City	1981–82	First Division	41	0	1	0	2	0	—		44	0
Stoke City	1982–83	First Division	3	0	0	0	0	0	—		3	0
Stoke City	Total		357	3	15	0	25	1	4	0	401	4
Wolverhampton Wanderers	1982–83	Second Division	27	3	2	0	0	0	—		29	3
Wolverhampton Wanderers	1983–84	First Division	41	0	3	0	2	0	—		47	0
Wolverhampton Wanderers	1984–85	Second Division	20	2	0	0	4	1	—		24	3
Wolverhampton Wanderers	Total		88	5	5	0	6	1	—		99	6
Stoke City	1984–85	First Division	16	0	0	0	0	0	—		16	0
Port Vale (loan)	1986–87	Third Division	2	0	0	0	0	0	1 (Note: Appearance in the Football League Trophy)	0	3	0
Landskrona BoIS	1989	Division 1 Södra	19	0	2	0	—		—		21	0
Career total			482	8	22	0	31	2	5	0	540	10

== Honours ==
Individual

- Stoke City F.C. Player of the Year: 1979–80
- Wolverhampton Wanderers Player of the Year: 1983–84

Stoke City

- Football League Second Division third-place promotion: 1978–79

Wolverhampton Wanderers

- Football League Second Division second-place promotion: 1982–83

IF Elfsborg

- Swedish football Division 2 Södra: 1985

GAIS

- Swedish football Division 1 Södra: 1987
