= Shamrock Rovers XI v Brazil =

- Event: Friendly
Shamrock Rovers XI	Brazil
(Republic of Ireland) (Northern Ireland)	(Brazil)
3	4
- Date: 3 July 1973
- Venue: Lansdowne Road, Dublin

The Shamrock Rovers XI v Brazil association football friendly match was played in Lansdowne Road in Dublin, Ireland, on 3 July 1973 between the Brazil national team and a team billed as "Shamrock Rovers XI", made up of Republic of Ireland and Northern Ireland international players. Brazil won the match 4–3; it was the first time in eight years that any team scored three goals against them. The match is the only one played since 1950 by a team representing the entire island of Ireland, although the name "Ireland" was changed to "Shamrock Rovers XI" after objections from the Northern Irish Irish Football Association.

== Background and aftermath ==
The match was played at the height of The Troubles in Northern Ireland as a gesture of friendship and solidarity. Louis Kilcoyne, the owner of the domestic Shamrock Rovers football team, persuaded João Havelange of the Brazilian FA to include a match against an "Ireland XI" on the itinerary for their nine-match summer tour of Europe, reportedly promising him the Republic of Ireland's Football Association of Ireland (FAI) vote in the 1974 election for President of FIFA.

Kilcoyne's brother-in-law and captain of the Republic team, Johnny Giles, and Derek Dougan of Northern Ireland were friendly with each other. They supported the project and persuaded many of their respective teammates to participate.

The Irish Football Association (IFA) was opposed to the match, seeing it as setting a precedent which might encourage moves for the IFA to merge with the FAI. Further, the Republic of Ireland manager, Liam Tuohy, who also managed this team, subsequently disclosed that the FAI also had reservations. In deference to these concerns, the "Ireland XI" had to be called a "Shamrock Rovers" selection, after the leading League of Ireland club connected to the Kilcoyne family. (In actuality, all the team played in the English League.) Also, only the Brazilian national anthem and flag were sung and displayed, although A Nation Once Again was among the tunes in the pre-match entertainment.

Derek Dougan alleged that IFA President Harry Cavan instructed Northern Ireland manager Terry Neill not to pick him in future because of his involvement in organising this match, thereby ending his international career. However, Dougan had not appeared in any of Northern Ireland's five matches prior to the game in Dublin, had failed to score in any of the last ten international games in which he had played and, at 35, he was in the twilight of his career. Indeed, he was to retire from playing full-time football less than two seasons later.

None of the five other Northern Ireland players who played in this match suffered any adverse consequences for their international career. Three of them (Jennings, Hamilton and O'Neill) were subsequently to captain Northern Ireland, and Hamilton was also appointed manager.

Despite the lack of support from the island's two FAs, following the match the FAI contacted the IFA regarding the possibility of re-unifying the two associations. The IFA unanimously agreed to talks, the first to be held about a possible merger since 1932. Nine IFA-FAI conferences were held between 1973 and 1980, with seven of those taking place between 1978 and 1980. Despite this the proposal did not come to fruition: reasons for its failure included the prospect of reduced revenue from international matches with the existence of one Irish team, ongoing violence (including a riot between Northern Irish side Linfield F.C. and the Republic's Dundalk F.C. at a European Cup tie at Dundalk's Oriel Park in 1979), and increased success for both Northern Ireland (during the early-to-mid 1980s) and the Republic of Ireland (in the late 1980s and early 1990s).

Proceeds from the match went to UNICEF and the Irish Cancer Society.

The match was featured on the RTÉ Television programme, Monday Night Soccer, on 7 April 2008.

== Match details ==
Line ups:

Shamrock Rovers XI (Republic of Ireland) (Northern Ireland)	3–4	Brazil
Martin; Conroy; Dougan		Caju; Jairzinho; Valdomiro

Lansdowne Road, Dublin

Shamrock Rovers XI
Brazil

GK	(Northern Ireland) Pat Jennings (Tottenham Hotspur)
DF	(Northern Ireland) David Craig (Newcastle United)
DF	(Republic of Ireland) Paddy Mulligan (Crystal Palace)
DF	(Northern Ireland) Allan Hunter (Ipswich Town)
DF	(Republic of Ireland) Tommy Carroll (Birmingham City)	(substituted off) 66'
MF	(Republic of Ireland) Johnny Giles (Leeds United)
MF	(Republic of Ireland) Mick Martin (Manchester United)
FW	(Republic of Ireland) Terry Conroy (Stoke City)	(substituted off) 88'
FW	(Northern Ireland) Martin O'Neill (Nottingham Forest)
FW	(Northern Ireland) Derek Dougan (Wolverhampton Wanderers)
FW	(Republic of Ireland) Don Givens (Queens Park Rangers)	(substituted off) 66'
Substitutes:
MF	(Northern Ireland) Liam O'Kane (Nottingham Forest)	(substituted on) 66'
FW	(Northern Ireland) Bryan Hamilton (Ipswich Town)	(substituted on) 66'
MF	(Republic of Ireland) Miah Dennehy (Nottingham Forest)	(substituted on) 88'
Manager:
(Republic of Ireland) Liam Tuohy (Shamrock Rovers)

GK	Émerson Leão (Palmeiras)
DF	Zé Maria (Corinthians)
DF	Luís Pereira (Palmeiras)
DF	Piazza (Cruzeiro)
DF	Marco Antônio (Fluminense)
MF	Caju (Flamengo)
MF	Clodoaldo (Santos)
MF	Rivellino (Corinthians)
MF	Dirceu (Botafogo)
FW	Jairzinho (Botafogo)
FW	Valdomiro (Internacional)
Manager:
(Brazil) Mário Zagallo (Flamengo)
