= Jacques Williams =

English footballer

Personal information
- Full name: Jacques Roger Williams
- Date of birth: 25 April 1981 (age 45)
- Place of birth: Wallasey, England
- Height: 5 ft 9 in (1.75 m)
- Position: Midfielder

Youth career
- 199?–1999: Bordeaux

Senior career*
Years	Team	Apps	(Gls)
1999–2002	Birmingham City	3	(0)
2003–2004	Scarborough	12	(1)
2005–2006	Excelsior Virton	3	(0)
2007–2008	Tractor Sazi	0	(0)
2008–2009	Steel Azin	7	(1)
2009–20??	Emirates Club	44	(0)
- * Club domestic league appearances and goals

Jacques Roger Williams (born 25 April 1981) is an English professional footballer who played as a midfielder for Birmingham City in the Football League.

== Football career ==
Williams was born in Wallasey, Cheshire, and raised in France. He started his football career in the youth system at Bordeaux, and played for the Bordeaux junior side which won the French under-18 championship. At the age of 18 he came to England with fellow French youngster Trésor Luntala for trials with Birmingham City, and both players signed on free transfers before the 1999–2000 season. Williams was on standby for the England under-18 match against Switzerland in September 1999, but an ankle problem prevented his taking part, and he was named in the preliminary squad for European Under-18 Championship qualifiers in October but remained unused. He made his first-team debut for Birmingham in August 2000, playing once in the League Cup and then three First Division matches, but his development was interrupted by the need for a double hernia operation. Though he recovered sufficiently to resume playing reserve team football, scoring the goals which put the team into the semifinal of the Birmingham Senior Cup, a spate of injuries meant that those four games were all he played for Birmingham's first team before being released when his contract expired.

He had a trial at Crewe Alexandra, on the recommendation of former assistant manager Brian Eastick, then academy director at Birmingham, but no contract ensued.

He joined Conference club Scarborough for the 2003–04 season, but sustained a broken rib and punctured lung in only his second game, complications from which meant a prolonged stay in hospital and three months out of football. Returning to action in November 2003, he played a further ten league games, but was only an unused substitute in the club's FA Cup fourth round match against Premier League club Chelsea, despite scoring and hitting the post in the preceding league game. He then injured an ankle, and was released at the end of the season.

He spent the 2005–06 season with Belgian Second Division club Excelsior Virton for whom he made three substitute appearances.

In August 2006 he had a trial with Brighton & Hove Albion, scoring in an 11–0 rout of French amateur side Racing Club Port du Havre and making a promising substitute appearance in a 2–0 defeat against Le Havre AC, but manager Mark McGhee decided against signing him.
