= Nick Sinclair (footballer) =

English footballer (born 1960)

Personal information
- Full name: Nicholas John Thomas Sinclair
- Date of birth: 3 January 1960 (age 66)
- Place of birth: Manchester, England
- Position: Full back

Senior career*
| Years | Team | Apps | (Gls) |
| 1978–1985 | Oldham Athletic | 75 | (1) |
| 1985 | → Wolverhampton Wanderers (loan) | 1 | (0) |
| 1985–1986 | Tranmere Rovers | 22 | (1) |
| Total | | 98 | (2) |
- * Club domestic league appearances and goals

Nick Sinclair (born 3 January 1960) is an English footballer who played as a full back in the Football League for Tranmere Rovers.
