= Chris Ward (footballer) =

English footballer (born 1981)

Personal information
- Full name: Christopher Ward
- Date of birth: 28 April 1981 (age 45)
- Place of birth: Preston, England
- Height: 6 ft 1 in (1.85 m)
- Position: Forward

Youth career
- Springfields
- Fulwood Amateurs

Senior career*
Years	Team	Apps	(Gls)
1999–2001	Lancaster City		
2001–2002	Birmingham City	0	(0)
2001–2002	→ Forest Green Rovers (loan)	5	(1)
2001–2002	→ Southport (loan)	3	(0)
2002–2003	Barrow	8	(3)
2002–2003	Leigh RMI	5	(1)
2002–2003	Lincoln City	6	(2)
2003–2004	Northwich Victoria		
2004–2005	Bamber Bridge	37	(14)
2005–2007	Kendal Town		
2006–2007	Mossley		
2006–2009	Clitheroe		
2008–2009	Chorley		
2009–2013	Lancaster City	5	(2)
- * Club domestic league appearances and goals

Chris Ward (born 28 April 1981) is an English footballer who plays as a forward or attacking midfielder. He played in the Football League for Lincoln City.

== Career ==
=== Early career ===
Hailing from the Preston suburb of Ashton-on-Ribble, Ward began his career with local sides Springfields and Fulwood Amateurs whilst studying at Ashton-on-Ribble High School and Preston College before signing for Lancaster City at the age of 18. Ward quickly made an impression at Lancaster, scoring on his full debut in the 2–0 away victory over Winsford United on 24 August 1999. A deluge of goals for Lancaster attracted the attention of scouts and on 24 April 2001 Ward agreed to join Birmingham City for £25,000; his contract would officially begin at the start of the 2001–02 season.

Ward failed to make the first team at Birmingham and in October 2001 he joined Forest Green on a month's loan, making his debut in the 2–2 home draw with Northwich Victoria on 29 September 2001 and scoring his first, and only, league goal for the club a week later in the 5–1 away defeat to Doncaster Rovers. In March 2002 he joined Southport, again on loan, debuting in the 3–2 home defeat to Boston United on 1 April 2002.

Released by Birmingham at the end of the season, he joined Barrow, making his debut in the 1–1 home draw with Hucknall Town on 17 August 2002 and scoring his first league goal for the club in the 1–1 away draw with Runcorn on the following Tuesday. Ward's time with Barrow would be brief as after just a month with the club he signed for Leigh RMI. After making his debut in the 1–0 away defeat to Farnborough Town on 21 September 2002, Ward notched his only league goal for Leigh in the 2–1 home victory over Stevenage Borough on 12 October.

=== Lincoln City ===
In October 2002, Ward returned to the Football League signing for Lincoln City where he linked up with sometime Lancaster City teammate Mark Bailey. He made his Football League debut for the club as a 74th-minute replacement for Adie Mike in the 0–0 draw at Darlington on 2 November, and scored his first goal for the club on his full league debut against Carlisle United on 4 February 2003, but he struggled to establish himself at Sincil Bank and was released at the end of the season.

=== Return to the non-leagues ===
He linked up with Northwich Victoria then Bamber Bridge. Moves to Kendal Town and Mossley followed. He moved on to Clitheroe, scoring on his debut in the 3–1 home defeat to Bradford Park Avenue on 6 January 2007. Teaching commitments caused Ward to miss most of the 2007–08 season but he resumed his Clitheroe career at the start of the 2008–09 season. In November 2008, Ward linked up with his one-time Lancaster City manager Tony Hesketh at Chorley, debuting in the 3–1 away defeat to FC Halifax Town on 15 November 2008. Hesketh departed the hot seat at Chorley to return to Lancaster City and Ward was one of five players who followed him from Chorley to the Giant Axe-based club ahead of the 2009–10 season. He marked his return to the club by scoring on his debut in the 5–0 home Northern Premier League Division One North victory over Prescot Cables on 15 August 2009.
