= Sammy Troughton =

Northern Irish footballer and coach

Personal information
- Full name: Samuel Edward Troughton
- Date of birth: 27 March 1964 (age 62)
- Place of birth: Lisburn, Northern Ireland
- Position: Forward

Senior career*
Years	Team	Apps	(Gls)
1982–1983	Glentoran	23	(0)
1983–1984	Wolverhampton Wanderers	17	(2)
- Arcadia Shepherds
1986	Crusaders	2	(1)
- Jomo Cosmos
- Orlando Pirates
1988–1990	Mamelodi Sundowns		
1992–1993	Glentoran	31	(2)

International career
	Northern Ireland Schools	6	
- Northern Ireland Youth

Managerial career
- 1994: Orlando Pirates
- 2005–2008: University of Pretoria
- 2008–2009: Mpumalanga Black Aces
- 2010–2011: Nathi Lions
- 2014–2016: University of Pretoria
- 2016: Vasco da Gama
- 2017: Free State Stars
- 2018: Uthongathi
- 2018: Witbank Spurs
- 2018: TS Sporting
- –2021: Pretoria Callies
- 2021: Cape Town All Stars
- 2021–2023: University of Pretoria
- 2023: Marumo Gallants
- * Club domestic league appearances and goals

Samuel Edward Troughton (born 27 March 1964 in Lisburn, Northern Ireland) is a Northern Irish former footballer who played as a forward and now a coach.

== Playing career ==
=== Club ===
Troughton played for Glentoran and Wolverhampton Wanderers before coming to South Africa in 1985 to play for Jomo Cosmos, Mamelodi Sundowns and then Orlando Pirates. He was popularly known as "Special Branch" during his playing days in South Africa. In 1986, he briefly played for Crusaders, playing two league games in two days against Linfield and Glentoran (scoring in the latter) in December 1986.

== Management career ==
After retiring from his playing career, Troughton coached mainly lower league South African sides like Arcadia Shepherds, Pretoria University and Durban Stars. He also had a short stint as Orlando Pirates coach in 1994 and worked as an assistant coach for Free State Stars.

Troughton was retained as University of Pretoria manager for the start of the 2015–16 season. In March 2016, he took charge of Vasco da Gama for the rest of the season. On the 8 October 2018, Sammy signed a two-year deal as the head coach of Witbank Spurs, but barely two weeks after the joining the club he left for Mpumalanga rivals TS Sporting.
