= David Hunt (footballer, born 1959) =

English footballer

Personal information
- Full name: David Hunt
- Date of birth: 17 April 1959 (age 67)
- Place of birth: Leicester, England
- Height: 5 ft 11 in (1.80 m)
- Position: Midfielder

Senior career*
Years	Team	Apps	(Gls)
1977–1978	Derby County	5	(0)
1978–1987	Notts County	336	(28)
1987–1989	Aston Villa	13	(0)
1989–1990	Mansfield Town	22	(0)
- Burton Albion
Total		376	(28)
- * Club domestic league appearances and goals

David Hunt (born 17 April 1959) is an English former footballer who played in the Football League as a midfielder for Derby County, Notts County, Aston Villa and Mansfield Town.
