= Geoff Palmer (footballer) =

English footballer

Personal information
- Full name: Geoffrey Palmer
- Date of birth: 11 July 1954 (age 72)
- Place of birth: Cannock, Staffordshire, England
- Height: 5 ft 11 in (1.80 m)
- Position: Right-back

Youth career
- 1970–1971: Wolverhampton Wanderers

Senior career*
Years	Team	Apps	(Gls)
1971–1984	Wolverhampton Wanderers	394	(13)
1984–1985	Burnley	34	(0)
1985–1986	Wolverhampton Wanderers	22	(0)
Total		460	(13)

International career
1974	England U23	2	(0)
- * Club domestic league appearances and goals

Geoffrey Palmer (born 11 July 1954) is a former professional footballer, who spent almost his entire career with Wolverhampton Wanderers.

== Career ==
Palmer was born in Cannock, Staffordshire. He spent 16 years with Wolves, playing 495 times for the club in total. A Wolves fan throughout his childhood, he joined as an apprentice in July 1970 and turned professional on his seventeenth birthday the following year. After remaining in the reserves over the next two seasons, he made his senior debut in the FA Cup 3rd/4th Place Play Off against Arsenal.

The right-back retained his place through the rest of the 1973–74 season at the expense of Gerry Taylor, which culminated in winning the League Cup after a 2–1 victory over Manchester City at Wembley. After two seasons where his appearances were hampered by injuries, he was an ever-present in the side that won the Second Division championship in 1976–77, and missed just three league games over the next two seasons.

He won a second League Cup winners' medal in 1980 after a 1–0 triumph over Nottingham Forest, making him one of four Wolves players to feature in both of their League Cup triumphs. He stuck with the club after relegation in 1982, winning promotion back at the first attempt. However, after another relegation, Palmer left Molineux for Burnley in November 1984.

His stay at Burnley was short-lived though, as he stayed for just over a year, during which time Burnley were relegated to the Fourth Division for the first time in their history, before rejoining Wolves, under his old manager Bill McGarry, in December 1985 in a campaign that saw the club relegated to the fourth tier for the first time in their history.

After a solitary final appearance in the Fourth Division in September 1986, Palmer retired to join the police force, where he was employed for 23 years until retirement in 2009. Palmer now lives in Codsall, near Wolverhampton.

== Honours ==
Wolverhampton Wanderers

- Football League Cup: 1973–74, 1979–80
