= Ian Cartwright =

English footballer

Personal information
- Date of birth: 13 November 1964
- Place of birth: Brierley Hill, England
- Date of death: 8 December 2016 (aged 52)
- Height: 5 ft 10 in (1.78 m)
- Position: Midfielder

Senior career*
| Years | Team | Apps | (Gls) |
| 1982–1986 | Wolverhampton Wanderers | 61 | (3) |
- Northfield
- * Club domestic league appearances and goals

Ian J. Cartwright (13 November 1964 – 7 December 2016) was an English footballer, who played in the Football League for Wolverhampton Wanderers.

== Career ==
Ian Cartwright signed for First Division Wolverhampton Wanderers as a youth trainee in 1980. He had to wait until his 18th birthday to make his first team debut, coming on as a substitute in a 1–4 defeat at Oldham Athletic. He made 9 appearances during the remainder of that season (scoring once) as the club won promotion back to the top flight at the first attempt.

He made 16 appearances during their doomed campaign of 1983/84 which saw them relegated from the First Division, beginning a slide down the divisions amid financial problems. Cartwright remained at the club until 1986 when released by manager Sammy Chapman, leaving him to play out his career in the non-league.

He died from renal and spinal cancer on 7 December 2016.
