= Alan Duffy (footballer) =

English footballer (born 1949)

Personal information
- Date of birth: 20 December 1949 (age 76)
- Place of birth: Stanley, County Durham
- Position: Midfielder

Senior career*
Years	Team	Apps	(Gls)
1968–1970	Newcastle United	2	(0)
1970–1972	Brighton & Hove Albion	50	(8)
1972–1973	Tranmere Rovers	33	(2)
1973–1974	Darlington	24	(0)
- Consett
Total		109	(10)
- * Club domestic league appearances and goals

Alan Duffy (born 20 December 1949) is an English footballer who played as a midfielder in the Football League for Newcastle United, Brighton & Hove Albion, Tranmere Rovers and Darlington.
