= Mark Buckland =

English footballer

Personal information
- Date of birth: 18 August 1961 (age 65)
- Place of birth: Cheltenham, England
- Positions: Defender; midfielder

Senior career*
Years	Team	Apps	(Gls)
- Cheltenham Town
- AP Leamington
1984–1985	Wolverhampton Wanderers	50	(5)
- Kidderminster Harriers
- Cheltenham Town
- * Club domestic league appearances and goals

Mark Buckland (born 18 August 1961 in Cheltenham) is an English former footballer, who played in the Football League for Wolverhampton Wanderers.

== Career ==
Buckland started his football career with his hometown team Cheltenham Town .

In November 1983 he played for AP Leamington in their FA Cup tie against Gillingham.

He signed for First Division Wolverhampton Wanderers in 1984. He had only one full season at Molineux, 1984-85, during which he made 41 appearances in total. He scored five goals but the club again suffered relegation in what proved his only season in league football.

He was still playing on his 50th birthday in 2011 for Bishop's Cleeve 3rd team.
