= Derek Dougan =

Northern Irish footballer and manager (1938–2007)

- Dougan as a Wolverhampton Wanderers player

Personal information
- Full name: Alexander Derek Dougan
- Date of birth: 20 January 1938
- Place of birth: Belfast, Northern Ireland
- Date of death: 24 June 2007 (aged 69)
- Place of death: Wolverhampton, England
- Position: Forward

Youth career
- 1951–1953: Cregagh Boys

Senior career*
Years	Team	Apps	(Gls)
1953–1957	Distillery		
1957–1959	Portsmouth	33	(9)
1959–1961	Blackburn Rovers	59	(26)
1961–1963	Aston Villa	51	(19)
1963–1965	Peterborough United	77	(38)
1965–1967	Leicester City	68	(35)
1967–1975	Wolverhampton Wanderers	258	(95)
1967	→ Los Angeles Wolves (loan)	11	(3)
1969	→ Kansas City Spurs (loan)	6	(4)
1975–1977	Kettering Town		
Total		563	(229)

International career
1952	Northern Ireland Schoolboys	3	(0)
- Northern Ireland Youth
1956	Northern Ireland Amateurs	2	(0)
1957–1959	Northern Ireland B	2	(3)
1958–1973	Northern Ireland	43	(8)

Managerial career
- 1975–1977: Kettering Town (player-manager)
- * Club domestic league appearances and goals

Alexander Derek Dougan (20 January 1938 – 24 June 2007) was a Northern Ireland international footballer, football manager, football chairman, pundit, and writer. He was also known by his nickname, "The Doog". He was capped by Northern Ireland at schoolboy, youth, Amateur, and 'B' team level, before he won 43 caps in a 15-year career for the senior team from 1958 to 1973, scoring eight international goals and featuring in the 1958 FIFA World Cup. He also played in the Shamrock Rovers XI v Brazil exhibition match in July 1973, which he also helped to organise.

A strong and physical forward, he began his career at Distillery in his native Belfast. He helped Distillery to win the Irish Cup in 1956, before he won a £4,000 move to English First Division side Portsmouth in August 1957. He was sold on to Blackburn Rovers in March 1959 for a fee of £15,000 and played for the club in the 1960 FA Cup Final despite handing in a transfer request the day before the final. He moved on to Aston Villa for £15,000 in July 1961 but struggled with injuries during a two-season stay at Villa Park. He dropped into the Third Division to join Peterborough United in 1963, who paid a £21,000 transfer fee. He returned to the top flight in November 1965 after being sold to Leicester City for £26,000. He was sold to Wolverhampton Wanderers for a £50,000 fee in March 1967 and helped the club to win promotion out of the Second Division in 1966–67, to lift the Texaco Cup in 1970 and the League Cup in 1974, and also played on the losing side of the 1972 UEFA Cup final. He also spent two summers in the United States playing for the club's sister teams, the Los Angeles Wolves and the Kansas City Spurs, who he helped to win the United Soccer Association and NASL International Cup respectively. He retired in 1975, scoring 279 goals in 661 league and cup appearances across 18 seasons in the Football League.

He was appointed player-manager at Southern League Premier Division side Kettering Town in 1975, a position he retained for two years. He negotiated the first shirt sponsorship deal in English football at the club. He chaired the Professional Footballers' Association (PFA) from 1970 to 1978, and helped to further players' rights and set up the first PFA player awards in 1974. Also, throughout the 1970s, he became a football pundit and writer and became particularly well known for his part in ITV's coverage of the 1970 and 1974 FIFA World Cup. After fronting a consortium that took it out of liquidation, he served as chairman of Wolverhampton Wanderers from August 1982 to January 1985. He stood as an independent politician in the Belfast East constituency in 1997 and later became involved in the UK Independence Party.

== Club career ==
=== Distillery ===
Alexander Derek Dougan was born in Belfast on 20 January 1938, the son of Jackie and Josie Dougan. His father worked at Belfast docks. His grandfather, Sandy, had played at half-back for Linfield, and two of Sandy's brothers also played for some of the leading clubs in Belfast. As a child, Dougan would usually spend between four and eight hours a day playing football in the street. His family were poor, and later in life Dougan joked that "on the street where I lived, if you paid your rent three weeks on the trot, the police used to come and see where you got the money from". As a teenager he spent 18 months working at a toy factory whilst playing amateur football for Cregagh Boys. He also trained with Linfield, but could not break into any of their junior teams. He instead joined Distillery in 1953. Manager Jimmy McIntosh handed him his first team debut on 5 February 1955, in a 0–0 Irish Cup first round draw with Glentoran. Maurice Tadman, who succeeded McIntosh as the club's manager in the summer of 1955, preferred to use Dougan as a target man centre-forward, as Dougan's height made him adept at winning and flicking on headers in the opposition penalty area.

Whilst playing part-time for Distillery, he also worked at the Harland and Wolff shipbuilding company. Though the maximum wage in England discouraged many of Belfast's top players from leaving their hometown, Dougan was determined to leave for the English Football League at the earliest opportunity, particularly so following the death of his mother in June 1955. He began to attract scouts from England after helping Distillery beat Glentoran 1–0 in the second replay of the 1956 final of the Irish Cup at Windsor Park. He played mostly at half-back in the 1956–57 season as Distillery finished sixth in the Irish League and ended up as runners-up in the Ulster Cup, City Cup, and County Antrim Shield.

=== Portsmouth ===
Dougan had trials at Preston North End and Bury before he was signed by Portsmouth for a fee of £4,000 in August 1957. "Pompey" struggled to a 20th-place finish in the First Division in the 1957–58 season. Some of his teammates resented Dougan for what he felt was the constructive criticism he offered in the dressing room. He made his first team debut, providing an assist for Jackie Henderson in a 3–0 victory over Manchester United at Old Trafford. He scored his first senior goal for the club in a 1–1 draw with Wolverhampton Wanderers. New manager Freddie Cox, who succeeded Eddie Lever at Fratton Park in 1958, took the club to relegation with a last-place finish in 1958–59 season. However, Dougan would miss much of the season with an ankle injury.

=== Blackburn Rovers ===
Dougan was sold to Blackburn Rovers for a fee of £15,000 in March 1959. He scored on his Rovers debut in a 1–1 draw away to Arsenal at Highbury. He scored twice on the opening day of the 1959–60 season, a 4–0 victory over Fulham, which began a sequence of five wins and a draw from Rovers's first six matches, at the end of which the club were in second-place and Dougan tallied eleven goals, four of which came in a 6–2 victory over West Ham United. Though their league campaign petered out to an eventual 17th-place finish, Rovers reached the 1960 FA Cup Final at Wembley after Dougan scored the winning goal past Sheffield Wednesday in the semi-finals. However, he did not enjoy his time at Ewood Park, and later wrote that "the dourness of the club matched that of the town. I could not shake off the depression that caused me to wake each day regretting that I had to go to the ground. Life was grey and monotonous". This led to him handing in a transfer request the day before the final, which he later admitted was an occasion where his "vanity triumphed over common sense". He was not at full fitness in the final itself, and had a quiet game as Blackburn lost 3–0 to Wolverhampton Wanderers. He opened the 1960–61 season with a hat-trick in a 3–0 win over Manchester United and went on to withdraw his transfer request.

=== Aston Villa ===
Dougan was signed by Aston Villa in July 1961 for a fee of £15,000. The 23-year-old was signed by manager Joe Mercer as a replacement for Gerry Hitchens, who had been sold on to Inter Milan earlier in the summer. Teammate Peter McParland later commented that "when Derek came to us at Aston Villa I think it was at a time when he was not taking the game particularly seriously". After returning from watching his "Villans" teammates win the 1961 League Cup Final at Villa Park on 5 September, Dougan was a passenger in a car accident which killed fellow passenger Malcolm Williams and left Dougan with a broken arm and head injuries; driver and teammate Bobby Thomson was charged but found 'Not Guilty' of careless driving. In November 2010 – three years after Dougan's death, Thomson claimed that Dougan had drunkenly pulled a deerstalker hat over his eyes, causing him to crash the car. Dougan recovered after three months on the sidelines and ended the 1961–62 season with 12 goals in 27 matches. He twisted his knee midway through the 1962–63 campaign after slipping in the street, and ended the season with 14 goals from 33 games.

=== Peterborough United ===
Dougan dropped down to the Third Division to join Peterborough United for a £21,000 fee in the summer of 1963. He later admitted that "I had made a mistake in going to the Third Division when I was a First Division player". The move did though have its benefits, as the club's physiotherapist managed to diagnose and eventually correct an ankle injury that had troubled Dougan for the previous five years. He scored 20 goals in 38 league games in the 1963–64 season, and at the end of the campaign manager Jack Fairbrother was replaced by Gordon Clark, who Dougan said "renewed my sense of vocation". He then scored seven goals in the club's 1964–65 run to the sixth round of the FA Cup, including one in their 2–1 win over top-flight Arsenal at London Road. Peterborough's league promotion campaign failed despite their cup exploits, causing Dougan to remark that "after playing at Stamford Bridge it was not easy to go to places like Gillingham on a cold Tuesday evening, where they are waiting for you with their sleeves rolled up".

=== Leicester City ===
Dougan returned to the First Division when he signed for Leicester City in May 1965 for a £26,000 fee. However, he had a difficult relationship with manager Matt Gillies despite being the first choice striker at Filbert Street. He scored 19 goals in 37 league games in the 1965–66 season to help the team to a seventh-place finish. He scored 21 goals in 35 league and cup games in the 1966–67 season, but his 'free spirit' nature frustrated Gillies, who sanctioned Dougan's sale despite his good form.

=== Wolverhampton Wanderers ===
In March 1967, Dougan dropped into the Second Division after being signed by Wolverhampton Wanderers manager Ronnie Allen for a £50,000 fee. He marked his home debut on 25 March by scoring a hat-trick against Hull City. He ended the 1966–67 season with nine goals in 11 games for Wolves, and helped the club to secure promotion to the First Division. He spent the summer of 1967 in the United States playing for the Los Angeles Wolves in the United Soccer Association, scoring three goals in 11 games to help Wolves to win the West Division title and then captained the side and scored a goal as they beat the Washington Whips 6–5 in the USA Final at the Los Angeles Memorial Coliseum.

Strike partner Ernie Hunt was sold to Everton for £80,000 in September 1967, which reduced the effectiveness of the Wolves attack, though Dougan still managed to finish as the club's top-scorer with 17 goals in 40 appearances across the 1967–68 campaign as Wolves retained their top-flight status with a 17th-place finish. In November 1968, Bill McGarry replaced Allen as manager, and Dougan later described the seven years he spent playing for McGarry as "the most traumatic of my career". Nevertheless, Dougan's form remained good, and he finished the 1968–69 season with 14 goals from 44 games as Wolves posted a 16th-place finish. He spent the summer of 1969 in the United States as the club again entered the American leagues, this time calling themselves the Kansas City Spurs and playing in the North American Soccer League, where they won the NASL International Cup.

Wolves enjoyed an excellent start to the 1969–70 season, winning seven of their opening eight games, but fell away to a mid-table finish after the shock retirement of 24-year old forward Peter Knowles, who left the game to become a full-time Jehovah's Witness volunteer. Dougan had a poor season, limited to just ten goals in 33 games due to injuries and an eight-week suspension, then the longest ban of the post-war era, for verbally abusing a linesman in a home defeat to Everton. The sending off by referee Keith Walker caused upheaval in the stands, occasioning the injury of 84 people. In the return fixture at Goodison Park, he suffered a clash of heads with full-back Keith Newton and had to undergo major reconstructive surgery and was out of action for two months. McGarry did not speak to Dougan during his two-month absence, but Dougan decided against issuing a transfer request as he did not want to further his reputation as a journeyman player.

Wolves finished fourth in the 1970–71 season, with Dougan claiming 12 goals from 25 league games as he was rotated throughout the campaign with Hugh Curran and Bobby Gould. Wolves also won the inaugural Texaco Cup after beating Heart of Midlothian 3–2 on aggregate in the final. The following season, he formed an understanding with John Richards that teammate Derek Parkin described as the "best partnership in Europe", which helped to boost Dougan's scoring tally and make Wolves one of the top teams in the country during the early 1970s. They qualified for the UEFA Cup, and Dougan scored a hat-trick in a first round 7–1 aggregate victory over Portuguese side Académica. Wolves then progressed past Dutch side Den Haag by the same score, beat East German side Carl Zeiss Jena 4–0 on aggregate, and overcome Italian giants Juventus 3–2 on aggregate before knocking out Ferencváro of Hungary 4–3 on aggregate to reach the final. There they lost 3–2 on aggregate to fellow English side Tottenham Hotspur, "Spurs" goalkeeper Pat Jennings putting in many saves at White Hart Lane to deny Dougan and Richards from levelling the tie after the first leg at Molineux ended in a 2–1 defeat. Wolves finished ninth in the league in the 1971–72 season, but managed to beat Leeds United on the final day of the season to prevent them from reaching league champions Derby County's point tally, Dougan scoring his 24th goal of the season to secure a 2–1 win at Molineux.

He scored 19 goals in 51 appearances in the 1972–73 campaign, helping the club to a fifth-place league finish and the semi-finals of the FA Cup and League Cup. They went on to beat Arsenal 3–1 at Highbury in the FA Cup third-place play-off match, which was the penultimate match of an unsuccessful five-year experiment. He scored 15 goals in 50 appearances in the 1973–74 season, and helped Wolves to finally win a trophy. They beat Halifax Town, Tranmere Rovers (after a replay), Exeter City, Liverpool, and Norwich City to reach the League Cup final. They beat Manchester City 2–1 in the final to secure the club's first trophy in 14 years. Dougan struggled with back injuries in the 1974–75 campaign. After being limited to just six appearances throughout the season, he announced his retirement in 1975. He was granted a testimonial game against a Don Revie International XI in October 1975, which ended in a 0–0 draw.

=== Kettering Town ===
Dougan with historic shirt

Dougan was appointed player-manager at Southern League Premier Division side Kettering Town in 1975, and immediately set on former Wolves teammate Brian Thompson as his assistant. Goalkeeper Gordon Livsey remembered Dougan as a great motivator, but tactically limited. Dougan negotiated a four-figure shirt sponsorship with Kettering Tyres, which was the first such deal in England. After its use in the Southern League Premier Division match against Bath City on 24 January 1976 the FA demanded that the club remove the sponsor's logo threatening a fine of £1000, and were not impressed when Dougan initially attempted to circumvent the FA's demands by shortening the branding 'Kettering Tyres' to simply 'Kettering T'. The logo was removed, though in June 1977 the FA decreed that a 2.5 square inch logo would be permitted in the future provided it was not "detrimental to the image of the game". He led the "Poppies" to a third-place league finish and the Third Round of the FA Cup in 1976–77. He helped to improve the career prospects of many of his players, particularly Billy Kellock, who went on to play over 250 games in the Football League after leaving Kettering in 1979. Dougan left the club after chairman John Nash resigned in June 1977.

== International career ==
Dougan represented Northern Ireland at schoolboy, youth, amateur and 'B' level as a wing-half and centre-defender. He made his senior international debut under Peter Doherty in a 1–0 win over Czechoslovakia during the 1958 FIFA World Cup on 8 June 1958. He had won nine caps before he joined Peterborough in 1962 when the drop to Third Division football left him out of international contention for the next three years. Bertie Peacock returned him to the team following his transfer to First Division Leicester City in 1965, and he missed just three of the next 37 internationals. He was named as captain when Terry Neill succeeded Billy Bingham as manager in 1971. He made his final appearance for Northern Ireland on 14 February 1973 in a 1974 FIFA World Cup qualifier against Cyprus. He won a total of 43 senior caps and scored eight goals in a 15-year international career. Despite playing alongside George Best for nine years, Northern Ireland did not qualify for a major tournament after the 1958 FIFA World Cup.

An advocate of an All-Ireland soccer team, Dougan was also one of six Northern Ireland internationals to feature in the Shamrock Rovers XI v Brazil exhibition match in July 1973; the "Shamrock Rovers XI" was a pseudonym for an All-Ireland team, which also featured Republic of Ireland internationals. He scored one of the goals for Rovers in the 4–3 defeat. Both the Northern Ireland-based Irish Football Association and the Republic of Ireland-based Football Association of Ireland had been "implacably opposed" to the staging of the game, which was why the team had to be called a "Shamrock Rovers XI". Meanwhile, Dougan, who had helped organise the match, subsequently alleged that his involvement meant that he never played for Northern Ireland again. Though it is arguable that it was at least as much a case of his Northern Ireland career having already effectively been ended, since he had been dropped from the team after a 1–0 defeat away to Cyprus the previous season and hadn't been selected for any of Northern Ireland's subsequent five matches before the Shamrock Rovers XI game, by which time he was already 35.

== Style of play ==
Dougan was a combative centre-forward who relied on his speed, strength and awareness to score and create goals. Former Peterborough United teammate Peter Deakin said that "his biggest strength was his ability in the air. If enough balls went into the area he would be on the end of 80 per cent of them". He had an excellent left-foot and was described as "streetwise" and "crafty", but was not a great passer of the ball. Opposition defenders did not like playing against him as he was strong and very difficult to defend against.

== Media career ==
In 1967, Dougan represented Leicester City on the television show Quizball. A fan of psychedelic rock, he cut his own single, "A Goal for Dougie", in 1968. In 1969 published his first autobiography, Attack!. His media appearances became more frequent in the 1970s, and he was asked to make up part of ITV's four man panel to provide coverage of the 1970 FIFA World Cup, along with Malcolm Allison, Paddy Crerand and Bob McNab. Presenter Brian Moore said that the panel "gave football punditry a fresh intoxicating sparkle". Dougan went on to host a half-hour show on BBC Radio Birmingham, which previewed the weekend's football. He published a second autobiography, The Sash He Never Wore, in 1972 (in 1997, he republished the book under the name The Sash He Never Wore – 25 Years On).

In 1974, he was surprised by Eamonn Andrews for an episode of This Is Your Life. Later in the year he published a novel, The Footballer. Author Melvyn Bragg wrote that The Footballer was "predictable" with "thinly drawn" characters, but praised the dialogue and the "narrative flair". Dougan reprised his role in ITV's World Cup coverage for the 1974 FIFA World Cup, with Brian Clough and Jack Charlton replacing Crerand and McNab. In 1976, Dougan assisted historian Percy M. Young in producing On the Spot: Football as a Profession, a social history book that included anecdotes and insight from Dougan to complement Young's research. He published a third autobiography in 1980, entitled Doog, which revealed his disdain for Bill McGarry. The following year he published How Not to Run Football, which condemned the footballing authorities for what Dougan termed a "Victorian-Edwardian" attitude. In 1983, he co-authored Matches of the Day with Pat Murphy.

== Football administration ==
=== PFA chairmanship ===
Dougan succeeded Terry Neill – his future Northern Ireland manager – as chairman of the Professional Footballers' Association (PFA) in 1970. He advocated the belief that players should control their own destiny and used his position as Chairman of the PFA to further players' rights. He oversaw the inaugural PFA awards in 1973–74, which included the PFA Players' Player of the Year, PFA Young Player of the Year, PFA Team of the Year, and PFA Merit Award. He pushed for freedom of contract for players, and in 1978 accepted a compromise deal that allowed players to switch clubs at the end of their contracts, providing that the player's new club and old club could agree on a transfer fee, with a tribunal agreeing on a fee in cases where clubs could not agree.

[Dougan] led the PFA, along with my predecessor Cliff Lloyd, all through negotiations in establishing a constitution and a collective bargaining agreement which have stood the test of time. at times he was a very controversial character, never frightened of taking on authority, which got him into trouble in his playing career and, needless to say, off the field as well. He led as chairman and brought in the players' right to move, which was the frontrunner of Bosman."

— PFA chairman Gordon Taylor, speaking after Dougan's death.

=== Chairmanship of Wolves ===
In August 1982, with the support of a shareholders’ rebellion against Harry Marshall led by his close friend Wolverhampton insurance-broker Roger Jeffrey Hipkiss, Dougan fronted a consortium (which was funded by the Saudi brothers Mahmud and Mohammad Bhatti of the company Allied Properties) that took Wolverhampton Wanderers out of liquidation, beating a rival bid from Doug Ellis. The brothers wanted anonymity, and were only revealed to the public after investigation by journalists. He sacked manager Ian Greaves. He replaced him with former Wolves teammate Graham Hawkins. However, the council rejected planning permission for the club to construct a supermarket, and the Bhattis were unwilling or unable to provide further funding for the club. Wolves won promotion out of the Second Division in 1982–83, but were relegated out of the First Division in last place in 1983–84, and Dougan sacked Hawkins and replaced him with Tommy Docherty. Dougan resigned mid-season in January 1985 with Wolves going on to suffer a second successive relegation in the 1984–85 season.

== Later life ==
Dougan stood as an independent 'Former Captain NI Football Team' candidate for the East Belfast constituency in the 1997 UK general election, but got only 541 votes and finished seventh out of the nine candidates. In April 2000, he was cleared of aggravated burglary following a trial at Wolverhampton Crown Court; the incident had been alleged to have taken place at the home of Patricia Thompson, a former lover. He was also cleared of assaulting a Vietnam War veteran with a pool cue, who had been at the home with Patricia Thompson at the time of the alleged burglary incident. In another court case, again in April 2000, Dougan failed to attend a hearing where he had been charged with driving carelessly and failing to comply with a red traffic signal; he said he had been unable to attend because he had a dental appointment.

In December 2005, he was a pallbearer at the funeral of George Best. On 14 June 2006, he appeared on the BBC political show Question Time, as a representative of the UK Independence Party. An opinionated and driven man, his partner noted how Dougan "loved a cause", and in his later years spent much of his time organising charity events and legal representation for retired footballers. He married Jutta, a German woman with whom he had two sons: Alexander (born 1965) and Nicholas (born 1967). He separated from Jutta and spent the last three years of his life with Merlyn Humphreys. Dougan died on 24 June 2007 from a heart attack at his home in Wolverhampton, at the age of 69. His funeral was held on 5 July at St Peter's Collegiate Church, and the service was transmitted to a crowd of mourners outside the church with loudspeakers. Speaking at his funeral, Nick Owen described Dougan as "controversial, fiery, humorous and passionate". He was inducted into the Wolverhampton Wanderers Hall of Fame in 2010, alongside former teammate Kenny Hibbitt.

== Career statistics ==
=== Club ===
Appearances and goals by club, season and competition
Club	Season	League			FA Cup		Other		Total	
Club	Season	Division	Apps	Goals	Apps	Goals	Apps	Goals	Apps	Goals
Distillery	1954–55	Irish League								
Distillery	1955–56	Irish League								
Distillery	1956–57	Irish League								
Total									77	17
Portsmouth	1957–58	First Division	26	8	2	0	0	0	28	6
Portsmouth	1958–59	First Division	7	1	1	0	0	0	8	1
Portsmouth	Total		33	9	3	0	0	0	36	9
Blackburn Rovers	1958–59	First Division	4	1	0	0	0	0	4	1
Blackburn Rovers	1959–60	First Division	33	14	9	3	0	0	42	17
Blackburn Rovers	1960–61	First Division	22	11	5	1	3	4	30	16
Blackburn Rovers	Total		59	26	14	4	3	4	76	34
Aston Villa	1961–62	First Division	23	10	4	2	0	0	27	12
Aston Villa	1962–63	First Division	28	9	1	0	4	5	33	14
Aston Villa	Total		51	19	5	2	4	5	60	26
Peterborough United	1963–64	Third Division	38	20	2	0	1	1	41	21
Peterborough United	1964–65	Third Division	39	18	8	7	2	0	49	25
Peterborough United	Total		77	38	10	7	3	1	90	46
Leicester City	1965–66	First Division	37	19	4	1	0	0	41	20
Leicester City	1966–67	First Division	31	16	1	0	3	5	35	21
Leicester City	Total		68	35	5	1	3	5	76	41
Wolverhampton Wanderers	1966–67	Second Division	11	9	0	0	0	0	11	9
Wolverhampton Wanderers	1967–68	First Division	38	17	1	0	1	0	40	17
Wolverhampton Wanderers	1968–69	First Division	39	11	2	2	3	1	44	14
Wolverhampton Wanderers	1969–70	First Division	26	8	1	0	6	2	33	10
Wolverhampton Wanderers	1970–71	First Division	25	12	2	0	7	1	34	13
Wolverhampton Wanderers	1971–72	First Division	38	15	0	0	13	9	51	24
Wolverhampton Wanderers	1972–73	First Division	37	12	6	2	8	5	51	19
Wolverhampton Wanderers	1973–74	First Division	38	10	0	0	12	5	50	15
Wolverhampton Wanderers	1974–75	First Division	6	1	0	0	3	1	9	2
Wolverhampton Wanderers	Total		258	95	12	4	53	24	323	123
Los Angeles Wolves (loan)	1967	United Soccer Association	11	3	—		0	0	11	3
Kansas City Spurs (loan)	1969	North American Soccer League	6	4	—		0	0	6	4
Career total			563	229	49	18	66	39	755	303

=== International ===
Northern Ireland
Year	Apps	Goals
1958	1	0
1959	1	0
1960	1	0
1961	3	2
1962	3	1
1965	3	1
1966	5	0
1967	2	0
1968	4	2
1969	5	0
1970	3	0
1971	7	2
1972	4	0
1973	1	0
Total	43	8

== Honours ==
Distillery

- Irish Cup: 1955–56

Blackburn Rovers

- FA Cup runner-up: 1959–60

Wolverhampton Wanderers

- Football League Cup: 1973–74
- Texaco Cup: 1970–71
- UEFA Cup runner-up: 1971–72
- Football League Second Division second-place promotion: 1966–67

Los Angeles Wolves

- United Soccer Association: 1967

Kansas City Spurs

- NASL International Cup: 1969
