= Eddie Lever =

English football manager

Eddie Lever was the manager of the English football club Portsmouth F.C. from 1952 to 1958. Lever took over at Pompey in 1952 after championship-winning manager Bob Jackson joined Hull City. He is credited with discovering a 16-year-old Jimmy Dickinson in the early 1940s.
