= Jim Barron (footballer, born 1943) =

English footballer (born 1943)

Personal information
- Full name: James Barron
- Date of birth: 19 October 1943 (age 83)
- Place of birth: Tantobie, England
- Height: 6 ft 1 in (1.85 m)
- Position: Goalkeeper

Youth career
- Newcastle West End

Senior career*
| Years | Team | Apps | (Gls) |
| 1961–1965 | Wolverhampton Wanderers | 8 | (0) |
| 1965–1966 | Chelsea | 1 | (0) |
| 1966–1970 | Oxford United | 152 | (0) |
| 1970–1974 | Nottingham Forest | 155 | (0) |
| 1974–1977 | Swindon Town | 79 | (0) |
| 1977 | Connecticut Bicentennials | 10 | (0) |
| 1977–1981 | Peterborough United | 21 | (0) |

Managerial career
- 1984: Wolverhampton Wanderers (caretaker)
- 1986: ÍA
- 1988–1989: Cheltenham Town
- 2001: Birmingham City (joint caretaker)
- 2006–2007: Northampton Town (joint caretaker)
- 2023–2024: Bath City (assistant)
- * Club domestic league appearances and goals

Jim Barron (born 19 October 1943) is an English football coach and former player who played as a goalkeeper. He played over 400 games in the Football League for a number of clubs over a twenty-year career.

== Playing career ==
Born in Tantobie, Barron played for Newcastle West End, Wolverhampton Wanderers, Chelsea, Oxford United, Nottingham Forest, Swindon Town, the Connecticut Bicentennials, and Peterborough United.

== Coaching career ==
Barron was Caretaker Manager at both Wolverhampton Wanderers (May 1984) and Birmingham City (October to December 2001) and permanent manager of Cheltenham Town in 1988–89.

He was first team coach at League One Northampton Town from 2002 to 2011. He was additionally appointed joint caretaker manager at Northampton on 20 December 2006, following the resignation of John Gorman. After the appointment of Stuart Gray as manager in January 2007, Barron reverted to his role as a first team coach. Barron was a scout for Everton from 2009 to 2020, a role which he left during the COVID-19 pandemic.

In July 2023, Barron was appointed the assistant manager of Bath City.
